= 2012–13 Tennessee State Tigers basketball team =

American college basketball season

2012–13 Tennessee State Tigers men's basketball

CIT, First Round
- Conference: Ohio Valley Conference
- East Division
- Record: 18–15 (11–5 OVC)
- Head coach: Travis Williams (1st season)
- Assistant coaches: Ben Betts; Rodney Hamilton; Brandon Johnson
- Home arena: Gentry Complex

2012–13 Ohio Valley Conference men's basketball standings
	Conf.				Overall
Team	W		L	PCT	W		L	PCT
East
Belmont †	14	–	2	.875	26	–	7	.788
Eastern Kentucky	12	–	4	.750	25	–	10	.714
Tennessee State	11	–	5	.688	18	–	15	.545
Jacksonville State*	8	–	8	.500	17	–	11	.607
Morehead State	8	–	8	.500	15	–	18	.455
Tennessee Tech	5	–	11	.313	12	–	17	.414
West
Murray State	10	–	6	.625	21	–	10	.677
Southeast Missouri State	8	–	8	.500	17	–	16	.515
Eastern Illinois	6	–	10	.375	11	–	21	.344
SIU Edwardsville	5	–	11	.313	9	–	18	.333
UT Martin	5	–	11	.313	9	–	21	.300
Austin Peay	4	–	12	.250	8	–	23	.258
† 2013 OVC tournament winner As of March 23, 2013 * Ineligible for Postseason play due to APR Penalties; Rankings from AP Poll

The 2012–13 Tennessee State Tigers basketball team represented Tennessee State University during the 2012–13 NCAA Division I men's basketball season. The Tigers, led by first year head coach and former assistant Travis Williams, played their home games at the Gentry Complex and were members of the East Division of the Ohio Valley Conference. They finished the season 18–15, 11–5 in OVC play to finish in third place in the East Division. They advanced to the semifinals of the OVC tournament where they lost to Belmont. They were invited to the 2013 CIT, their second consecutive CIT appearance, where they lost in the first round to Evansville.

== Roster ==
Number	Name	Position	Height	Weight	Year	Hometown
1	DeShawn Dockery	Guard	5–10	160	Junior	Chicago, Illinois
2	Patrick Miller	Guard	6–1	189	Junior	Chicago, Illinois
3	Kharon Butcher	Guard	6–2	173	Sophomore	Atlanta, Georgia
5	Jay Harris	Guard	5–10	156	Sophomore	Philadelphia, Pennsylvania
21	Kellen Thornton	Forward	6–7	243	Senior	Chicago, Illinois
22	Tashan Fredrick	Guard	6–4	204	Senior	Hemingway, South Carolina
24	Taylor Ward	Guard	6–4	151	Freshman	White House, Tennessee
33	Robert Covington	Forward	6–9	215	Senior	Bellwood, Illinois
34	M. J. Rhett	Forward	6–8	232	Sophomore	Hopkins, South Carolina
44	Michael Green	Forward	6–9	192	Junior	Columbia, South Carolina
45	Jordan Cyphers	Guard	6–4	179	Senior	Wichita, Kansas

== Schedule ==
Date time, TV	Opponent	Result	Record	Site (attendance) city, state
Exhibition
11/05/2012*; 7:00 pm	Trevecca Nazarene	W 86–56		Gentry Complex (1,087); Nashville, TN
Regular season
11/09/2012*; 8:00 pm, BYUtv	at BYU; Coaches Vs. Cancer Classic	L 66–81	0–1	Marriott Center (16,283); Provo, UT
11/13/2012*; 7:00 pm	at South Dakota State	L 71–78	0–2	Frost Arena (3,193); Brookings, SD
11/15/2012*; 7:00 pm, ESPN3	at Minnesota	L 43–72	0–3	Williams Arena (10,107); Minneapolis, MN
11/19/2012*; 3:00 pm	vs. South Alabama; Coaches Vs. Cancer Classic	W 68–57	1–3	GSU Sports Arena (339); Atlanta, GA
11/20/2012*; 6:00 pm	at Georgia State; Coaches Vs. Cancer Classic	L 57–59	1–4	GSU Sports Arena (1,104); Atlanta, GA
11/21/2012*; 11:00 am	vs. Monmouth; Coaches Vs. Cancer Classic	L 70–81	1–5	GSU Sports Arena (369); Atlanta, GA
11/26/2012*; 7:00 pm	Fisk	W 92–53	2–5	Gentry Complex (12,057); Nashville, TN
12/01/2012*; 7:00 pm	at Alabama A&M	W 83–72	3–5	Elmore Gymnasium (1,059); Huntsville, AL
12/04/2012*; 7:00 pm	Drexel	W 76–66	4–5	Gentry Complex (1,011); Nashville, TN
12/08/2012*; 2:00 pm, ESPN3	at No. 12 Missouri	L 38–68	4–6	Mizzou Arena (10,338); Columbus, MO
12/16/2012*; 4:00 pm	LeMoyne–Owen	W 79–39	5–6	Gentry Complex (1,027); Nashville, TN
12/18/2012*; 7:00 pm	at Middle Tennessee	L 48–77	5–7	Murphy Center (3,717); Murfreesboro, TN
12/21/2012*; 7:00 pm	USC Upstate	W 67–64	6–7	Gentry Complex (327); Nashville, TN
12/29/2012; 7:45 pm	Eastern Illinois	W 67–59	7–7 (1–0)	Gentry Complex (1,159); Nashville, TN
01/03/2013; 7:00 pm	at Tennessee Tech	W 72–66	8–7 (2–0)	Eblen Center (901); Cookeville, TN
01/05/2013; 4:30 pm	at Jacksonville State	W 66–57	9–7 (3–0)	Pete Mathews Coliseum (1,001); Jacksonville, AL
01/10/2013; 7:00 pm	Tennessee–Martin	W 80–48	10–7 (4–0)	Gentry Complex (812); Nashville, TN
01/12/2013; 7:00 pm	Southeast Missouri State	W 81–69	11–7 (5–0)	Gentry Complex (776); Nashville, TN
01/17/2013; 7:00 pm	Jacksonville State	W 66–60	12–7 (6–0)	Gentry Complex (1,236); Nashville, TN
01/19/2013; 7:00 pm	at Belmont	L 66–78	12–8 (6–1)	Curb Event Center (4,102); Nashville, TN
01/24/2013; 6:00 pm	at Eastern Kentucky	L 67–76	12–9 (6–2)	Alumni Coliseum (2,250); Richmond, KY
01/26/2013; 6:30 pm	at Morehead State	L 69–78	12–10 (6–3)	Ellis Johnson Arena (3,403); Morehead, KY
01/31/2013; 7:00 pm	Tennessee Tech	W 84–65	13–10 (7–3)	Gentry Complex (1,241); Nashville, TN
02/07/2013; 7:00 pm	at Austin Peay	W 88–82 ^{OT}	14–10 (8–3)	Dunn Center (2,186); Clarksville, TN
02/09/2013; 7:00 pm	at Murray State	L 48–69	14–11 (8–4)	CFSB Center (6,762); Murray, KY
02/14/2013; 6:00 pm, ESPNU	Belmont	W 80–69	15–11 (9–4)	Gentry Complex (3,215); Nashville, TN
02/20/2013; 7:00 pm	at SIU Edwardsville	W 83–73	16–11 (10–4)	Vadalabene Center (1,449); Edwardsville, IL
02/23/2013*; 7:00 pm	Loyola (MD); BracketBusters	L 67–69	16–12	Gentry Complex (1,231); Nashville, TN
02/28/2013; 6:00 pm, ESPNU	Morehead State	L 100–101	16–13 (10–5)	Gentry Complex (3,578); Nashville, TN
03/02/2013; 7:45 pm	Eastern Kentucky	W 85–81 ^{OT}	17–13 (11–5)	Gentry Complex (2,771); Nashville, TN
2013 OVC Basketball tournament
03/07/2013; 6:00 pm	vs. Morehead State; Quarterfinals	W 88–75	18–13	Nashville Municipal Auditorium (1,398); Nashville, TN
03/08/2013; 6:00 pm, ESPNU	vs. Belmont; Semifinals	L 73–82	18–14	Nashville Municipal Auditorium (3,977); Nashville, TN
2013 CIT
03/19/2013*; 7:00 pm	at Evansville; First Round	L 72–84	18–15	Ford Center (2,324); Evansville, IN
*Non-conference game. ^{#}Rankings from AP Poll. (#) Tournament seedings in parentheses. All times are in Central Time.
