= 2012–13 SIU Edwardsville Cougars men's basketball team =

American college basketball season

2012–13 SIU Edwardsville Cougars men's basketball
- Conference: Ohio Valley Conference
- West Division
- Record: 9–18 (5–11 OVC)
- Head coach: Lennox Forrester (6th season)
- Assistant coaches: Matt Laur; Kris Crosby; Deryl Cunningham
- Home arena: Vadalabene Center

2012–13 Ohio Valley Conference men's basketball standings
| | Conf. | | | | Overall |
| Team | W | | L | PCT | W | | L | PCT |
|---|---|---|---|---|---|---|---|---|
East
| Belmont † | 14 | – | 2 | .875 | 26 | – | 7 | .788 |
| Eastern Kentucky | 12 | – | 4 | .750 | 25 | – | 10 | .714 |
| Tennessee State | 11 | – | 5 | .688 | 18 | – | 15 | .545 |
| Jacksonville State* | 8 | – | 8 | .500 | 17 | – | 11 | .607 |
| Morehead State | 8 | – | 8 | .500 | 15 | – | 18 | .455 |
| Tennessee Tech | 5 | – | 11 | .313 | 12 | – | 17 | .414 |
West
| Murray State | 10 | – | 6 | .625 | 21 | – | 10 | .677 |
| Southeast Missouri State | 8 | – | 8 | .500 | 17 | – | 16 | .515 |
| Eastern Illinois | 6 | – | 10 | .375 | 11 | – | 21 | .344 |
| SIU Edwardsville | 5 | – | 11 | .313 | 9 | – | 18 | .333 |
| UT Martin | 5 | – | 11 | .313 | 9 | – | 21 | .300 |
| Austin Peay | 4 | – | 12 | .250 | 8 | – | 23 | .258 |
† 2013 OVC tournament winner As of March 23, 2013 * Ineligible for Postseason play due to APR Penalties; Rankings from AP Poll

The 2012–13 SIU Edwardsville Cougars men's basketball team represented Southern Illinois University Edwardsville during the 2012–13 NCAA Division I men's basketball season. The Cougars, led by sixth-year head coach Lennox Forrester, played their home games at the Vadalabene Center and were members of the West Division of the Ohio Valley Conference. This was the first season in which SIU Edwardsville was an eligible member to play in the Ohio Valley Tournament.

== Preseason ==
Ten players returned from the 10–17 team of 2011–12, and two transfers were newly eligible.

The OVC's pre-season coaches' poll picked SIUE to finish fourth in the West Division. Senior Mark Yelovich was selected to the pre-season All-OVC team.

== Season ==
During the season, crucial team members Reggie Reed, Maurice Wiltz, and Mark Yelovich suffered injuries, and late in the season, leading scorer Jerome Jones was suspended for the duration. As a result, the Cougars foundered, ending the season 9–18 and 5–11 in OVC play to finish in a tie for fourth place in the West Division. They failed to qualify for the Ohio Valley Conference tournament.

== Roster ==
| # | Name | Position | Height | Weight | Year | Hometown | High School | Transfer from |
|---|---|---|---|---|---|---|---|---|
| 1 | Kris Davis | Guard | 6–2 | 179 | Sophomore | Detroit, Michigan | Detroit Cass Technical | |
| 2 | Maurice Wiltz | Guard | 6–2 | 175 | Sophomore | Stafford, Texas | Stafford HS | Colorado State |
| 4 | Tim Johnson | Guard | 6–3 | 200 | Junior | Lansing, Illinois | Lee Academy (ME) | George Washington |
| 5 | Grant Fiorentinos † | Forward/Center | 6–10 | 235 | Junior | Cape Town, Western Cape, South Africa | Hun School of Princeton (NJ) | Tulane |
| 10 | Reggie Reed | Guard | 5–9 | 165 | Senior | St. Petersburg, Florida | St. Petersburg Lakewood | Rend Lake College (JC) |
| 14 | Derian Shaffer | Forward | 6–7 | 230 | Senior | Detroit, Michigan | Detroit Cass Technical | Kilgore College (JC) |
| 15 | Michael Birts | Forward | 6–6 | 200 | Sophomore | Miami, Florida | Miami Robert Morgan | |
| 22 | Charles Joy | Forward | 6–5 | 225 | Sophomore | O'Fallon, Illinois | O'Fallon Township High School | |
| 24 | Kyle Heck | Guard | 6–2 | 188 | Sophomore | Metamora, Illinois | Metamora Township High School | |
| 25 | Ray Lester | Forward | 6–6 | 225 | Junior | Chicago, Illinois | Crete-Monee High School | Vincennes University (JC) |
| 30 | Michael Messer | Guard | 6–5 | 208 | Sophomore | Wildwood, Missouri | Lafayette High School | |
| 32 | Donivine Stewart † | Guard | 5–11 | 190 | Sophomore | Peoria, Illinois | Bartonville Limestone Community High School | Bradley |
| 33 | Mark Yelovich | Forward | 6–6 | 223 | Senior | Mt. Zion, Illinois | Mount Zion High School | |
| 34 | Zeke Schneider | Forward/Center | 6–9 | 225 | Senior | Metamora, Illinois | Metamora Township High School | |
| 35 | Jerome Jones | Forward | 6–6 | 215 | Senior | St. Louis, Missouri | St.Louis Miller Career Academy | Indian Hills (JC) |

† Sat out 2012–13 season due to NCAA Division I transfer rules

== Schedule ==
Source =

| Date time, TV | Opponent | Result | Record | Site (attendance) city, state |
Exhibition
| 11/01/2012*; 7:00 pm | Greenville | W 84–50 | | Vadalabene Center (1,693); Edwardsville, IL |
| 11/06/2012*; 7:00 pm | MacMurray | W 77–59 | | Vadalabene Center (1,289); Edwardsville, IL |
Regular Season
| 11/10/2012*; 5:00 pm, ESPN3 | at No. 15 Missouri | L 69–83 | 0–1 | Mizzou Arena (10,054); Columbia, MO |
| 11/14/2012*; 7:00 pm | Western Illinois | W 62–50 | 1–1 | Vadalabene Center (1,706); Edwardsville, IL |
| 11/20/2012*; 7:00 pm, FS Midwest | Southern Illinois | L 55–71 | 1–2 | Vadalabene Center (3,507); Edwardsville, IL |
| 11/24/2012*; 7:00 pm | at Texas–Pan American | L 66–77 | 1–3 | UTPA Fieldhouse (305); Edinburg, TX |
| 12/01/2012*; 2:00 pm | Chicago State | W 71–57 | 2–3 | Vadalabene Center (1,502); Edwardsville, IL |
| 12/05/2012*; 7:00 pm | at Northern Illinois | L 54–65 | 2–4 | Convocation Center (2,750); DeKalb, IL |
| 12/08/2012*; 7:00 pm | at Western Illinois | L 38–55 | 2–5 | Western Hall (1,786); Macomb, IL |
| 12/17/2012*; 7:00 pm | Eureka | W 77–74 | 3–5 | Vadalabene Center (1,078); Edwardsville, IL |
| 12/19/2012*; 7:00 pm | Robert Morris–Springfield | W 81–49 | 4–5 | Vadalabene Center (1,055); Edwardsville, IL |
| 12/28/2012*; 7:00 pm, FS Midwest | at Saint Louis | L 41–68 | 4–6 | Chaifetz Arena (8,175); St. Louis, MO |
| 01/03/2013; 6:00 pm | at Morehead State | L 64–68 | 4–7 (0–1) | Ellis Johnson Arena (1,716); Morehead, KY |
| 01/05/2013; 6:00 pm | at Eastern Kentucky | L 72–78 | 4–8 (0–2) | Alumni Coliseum (1,400); Richmond, KY |
| 01/10/2013; 7:00 pm, FS Midwest | Jacksonville State | L 62–75 | 4–9 (0–3) | Vadalabene Center (1,903); Edwardsville, IL |
| 01/12/2013; 7:00 pm, KPLR | Tennessee Tech | W 58–54 | 5–9 (1–3) | Vadalabene Center (1,642); Edwardsville, IL |
| 01/17/2013; 7:00 pm | at Austin Peay | W 66–53 | 6–9 (2–3) | Dunn Center (2,014); Clarksville, TN |
| 01/19/2013; 7:30 pm, KPLR/ESPN3 | at Murray State | L 61–70 | 6–10 (2–4) | CFSB Center (5,102); Murray, KY |
| 01/24/2013; 7:00 pm, FS Midwest | Southeast Missouri State | W 80–77 | 7–10 (3–4) | Vadalabene Center (1,989); Edwardsville, IL |
| 01/26/2013; 7:00 pm, KPLR | Tennessee–Martin | L 62–65 | 7–11 (3–5) | Vadalabene Center (1,634); Edwardsville, IL |
| 02/02/2013; 7:00 pm, FS Midwest | Eastern Illinois | W 49–45 | 8–11 (4–5) | Vadalabene Center (2,044); Edwardsville, IL |
| 02/07/2013; 7:00 pm | at Southeast Missouri State | L 67–76 | 8–12 (4–6) | Show Me Center (2,212); Cape Girardeau, MO |
| 02/09/2013; 12:00 pm, FS South & FS Midwest | at Tennessee–Martin | L 68–77 | 8–13 (4–7) | Skyhawk Arena (1,674); Martin, TN |
| 02/14/2013; 7:00 pm, KPLR/ESPN3 | Murray State | W 65–60 | 9–13 (5–7) | Vadalabene Center (2,103); Edwardsville, IL |
| 02/16/2013; 7:00 pm, KPLR | Austin Peay | L 71–83 | 9–14 (5–8) | Vadalabene Center (2,436); Edwardsville, IL |
| 02/20/2013; 7:00 pm, FS Midwest | Tennessee State | L 73–83 | 9–15 (5–9) | Vadalabene Center (1,449); Edwardsville, IL |
| 02/23/2013*; 4:30 pm | at Central Arkansas; BracketBusters | L 78–80 | 9–16 | Farris Center (1,889); Conway, AR |
| 02/27/2013; 7:00 pm | at Belmont | L 43–73 | 9–17 (5–10) | Curb Event Center (1,364); Nashville, TN |
| 03/02/2013; 4:00 pm | at Eastern Illinois | L 46–61 | 9–18 (5–11) | Lantz Arena (1,885); Charleston, IL |
*Non-conference game. ^{#}Rankings from AP Poll. (#) Tournament seedings in parentheses. All times are in Central Time.
