= 2012–13 Tennessee Tech Golden Eagles men's basketball team =

American college basketball season

2012–13 Tennessee Tech Golden Eagles men's basketball
- Conference: Ohio Valley Conference
- East Division
- Record: 12–17 (5–11 OVC)
- Head coach: Steve Payne (2nd season)
- Assistant coaches: Rick Cabrera; Brian Kloman; Russ Willemsen
- Home arena: Eblen Center

2012–13 Ohio Valley Conference men's basketball standings
	Conf.				Overall
Team	W		L	PCT	W		L	PCT
East
Belmont †	14	–	2	.875	26	–	7	.788
Eastern Kentucky	12	–	4	.750	25	–	10	.714
Tennessee State	11	–	5	.688	18	–	15	.545
Jacksonville State*	8	–	8	.500	17	–	11	.607
Morehead State	8	–	8	.500	15	–	18	.455
Tennessee Tech	5	–	11	.313	12	–	17	.414
West
Murray State	10	–	6	.625	21	–	10	.677
Southeast Missouri State	8	–	8	.500	17	–	16	.515
Eastern Illinois	6	–	10	.375	11	–	21	.344
SIU Edwardsville	5	–	11	.313	9	–	18	.333
UT Martin	5	–	11	.313	9	–	21	.300
Austin Peay	4	–	12	.250	8	–	23	.258
† 2013 OVC tournament winner As of March 23, 2013 * Ineligible for Postseason play due to APR Penalties; Rankings from AP Poll

The 2012–13 Tennessee Tech Golden Eagles men's basketball team represented Tennessee Technological University during the 2012–13 NCAA Division I men's basketball season. The Golden Eagles, led by second-year head coach Steve Payne, played their home games at the Eblen Center and were members of the East Division of the Ohio Valley Conference.

They finished the season 12–17, 5–11 in OVC play to finish in last place in the East Division. They failed to qualify for the Ohio Valley Conference tournament.

== Roster ==
Number	Name	Position	Height	Weight	Year	Hometown
0	Josiah Moore	Guard	6–5	215	Sophomore	Oakville, Ontario
2	Jeremiah Samarrippas	Guard	5–10	170	Junior	Bartow, Florida
3	Matt Marseille	Guard/forward	6–5	205	Junior	Brooklyn, New York
4	DeOndre Haynes	Guard	6–3	180	Freshman	Calera, Alabama
5	Javon McKay	Guard/forward	6–5	195	Sophomore	Roswell, Georgia
10	Lanerryl Johnson	Guard	6–1	175	Freshman	Atlanta, Georgia
11	Terrell Barnes	Forward	6–8	265	Senior	Riverdale, Georgia
12	Mitchell Hill	Guard	6–1	180	Sophomore	Cookeville, Tennessee
15	Ammanuel Diressa	Guard	6–4	190	Freshman	Toronto, Ontario
25	Jud Dillard	Guard	6–5	200	Senior	Atlanta, Georgia
30	Ryon Riggins	Forward	6–9	210	Freshman	Sugar Hill, Georgia
33	Dennis Ogbe	Forward	6–7	210	Junior	Munich, Germany
35	Anthony Morse	Forward	6–8	215	Freshman	Lawrenceville, Georgia
50	Eric Weisenbach	Forward/center	7–0	215	Freshman	Dublin, Ohio

== Schedule ==
Date time, TV	Opponent	Result	Record	Site (attendance) city, state
Regular season
11/10/2012*; 8:00 pm	Crowley's Ridge	W 107–32	1–0	Eblen Center (1,892); Cookeville, TN
11/15/2012*; 7:00 pm	Coastal Carolina	W 71–69	2–0	Eblen Center (1,231); Cookeville, TN
11/17/2012*; 3:00 pm	at East Tennessee State	W 65–62	3–0	ETSU/MSHA Athletic Center (2,526); Johnson City, TN
11/20/2012*; 7:30 pm	Evansville	L 50–62	3–1	Eblen Center (N/A); Cookeville, TN
11/28/2012*; 7:00 pm	at Loyola–Chicago	L 78–81	3–2	Joseph J. Gentile Arena (1,812); Chicago, IL
11/30/2012*; 7:00 pm	at Lipscomb	L 64–80	3–3	Allen Arena (2,254); Nashville, TN
12/03/2012*; 7:00 pm	Berea	W 69–45	4–3	Eblen Center (855); Cookeville, TN
12/06/2012*; 7:30 pm	Green Bay	W 74–68	5–3	Eblen Center (1,550); Cookeville, TN
12/08/2012*; 6:00 pm	at Gardner–Webb	L 41–61	5–4	Ernest W. Spangler Stadium (1,645); Boiling Springs, NC
12/15/2012*; 7:00 pm	at Milwaukee	W 69–58	6–4	Klotsche Center (2,016); Milwaukee, WI
12/18/2012*; 7:00 pm	at Auburn	L 62–81	6–5	Auburn Arena (4,323); Auburn, AL
12/22/2012*; 12:00 pm	at No. 24 Oklahoma State	L 42–78	6–6	Gallagher-Iba Arena (9,347); Stillwater, OK
12/29/2012; 4:30 pm	at Jacksonville State	L 62–83	6–7 (0–1)	Pete Mathews Coliseum (1,229); Jacksonville, AL
01/03/2013; 7:00 pm	Tennessee State	L 66–72	6–8 (0–2)	Eblen Center (901); Cookeville, TN
01/05/2013; 7:45 pm	Belmont	L 52–83	6–9 (0–3)	Eblen Center (3,582); Cookeville, TN
01/10/2013; 7:00 pm	at Eastern Illinois	W 77–73	7–9 (1–3)	Lantz Arena (1,004); Charleston, IL
01/12/2013; 7:00 pm	at SIU Edwardsville	L 54–58	7–10 (1–4)	Vadalabene Center (1,642); Edwardsville, IL
01/19/2013; 7:00 pm	at Southeast Missouri State	L 62–74	7–11 (1–5)	Show Me Center (2,294); Cape Girardeau, MO
01/24/2013; 7:00 pm, ESPNU	Murray State	L 39–47	7–12 (1–6)	Eblen Center (1,711); Cookeville, TN
01/26/2013; 7:30 pm	Austin Peay	W 70–52	8–12 (2–6)	Eblen Center (2,459); Cookeville, TN
01/31/2013; 7:00 pm	at Tennessee State	L 65–84	8–13 (2–7)	Gentry Complex (1,241); Nashville, TN
02/02/2013; 7:00 pm	at Belmont	L 52–74	8–14 (2–8)	Curb Event Center (3,641); Nashville, TN
02/09/2013; 7:30 pm	Jacksonville State	W 78–64	9–14 (3–8)	Eblen Center (3,101); Cookeville, TN
02/14/2013; 6:00 pm	at Eastern Kentucky	L 69–80	9–15 (3–9)	Alumni Coliseum (2,350); Richmond, KY
02/16/2013; 6:30 pm	at Morehead State	L 63–65	9–16 (3–10)	Ellis Johnson Arena (2,345); Morehead, KY
02/21/2013; 7:00 pm	Tennessee–Martin	W 83–68	10–16 (4–10)	Eblen Center (1,269); Cookeville, TN
02/23/2013*; 7:00 pm	UMKC; BracketBusters	W 68–62	11–16	Eblen Center (1,534); Cookeville, TN
02/28/2013; 7:30 pm	Eastern Kentucky	L 54–69	11–17 (4–11)	Eblen Center (2,295); Cookeville, TN
03/02/2013; 7:30 pm	Morehead State	W 72–66	12–17 (5–11)	Eblen Center (2,460); Cookeville, TN
*Non-conference game. ^{#}Rankings from AP Poll. (#) Tournament seedings in parentheses. All times are in Central Time.
