= 2012–13 Morehead State Eagles men's basketball team =

American college basketball season

2012–13 Morehead State Eagles men's basketball
- Conference: Ohio Valley Conference
- East Division
- Record: 15–18 (8–8 OVC)
- Head coach: Sean Woods (1st season)
- Assistant coaches: Dylan Howard; Brian "B.J." Ellis; Beau Braden
- Home arena: Ellis Johnson Arena

2012–13 Ohio Valley Conference men's basketball standings
	Conf.				Overall
Team	W		L	PCT	W		L	PCT
East
Belmont †	14	–	2	.875	26	–	7	.788
Eastern Kentucky	12	–	4	.750	25	–	10	.714
Tennessee State	11	–	5	.688	18	–	15	.545
Jacksonville State*	8	–	8	.500	17	–	11	.607
Morehead State	8	–	8	.500	15	–	18	.455
Tennessee Tech	5	–	11	.313	12	–	17	.414
West
Murray State	10	–	6	.625	21	–	10	.677
Southeast Missouri State	8	–	8	.500	17	–	16	.515
Eastern Illinois	6	–	10	.375	11	–	21	.344
SIU Edwardsville	5	–	11	.313	9	–	18	.333
UT Martin	5	–	11	.313	9	–	21	.300
Austin Peay	4	–	12	.250	8	–	23	.258
† 2013 OVC tournament winner As of March 23, 2013 * Ineligible for Postseason play due to APR Penalties; Rankings from AP Poll

The 2012–13 Morehead State Eagles men's basketball team represented Morehead State University during the 2012–13 NCAA Division I men's basketball season. The Eagles, led by first year head coach Sean Woods, played their home games at Ellis Johnson Arena and were members of the East Division of the Ohio Valley Conference.

They finished the season 15–18, 8–8 in OVC play to finish in a tie for fourth place in the East Division. They lost in the quarterfinals of the Ohio Valley Conference tournament to Tennessee State.

== Roster ==
Number	Name	Position	Height	Weight	Year	Hometown
00	Drew Kelly	Forward	6–7	235	Junior	Franklin, Tennessee
1	Kahlil Owens	Forward	6–7	250	Senior	Pensacola, Florida
2	Devon Atkinson	Guard	6–1	175	Senior	Farmville, North Carolina
3	Maurice Lewis–Briggs	Forward	6–8	215	Junior	Norristown, Pennsylvania
4	Jarrett Stokes	Guard	6–1	170	Junior	Smyrna, Georgia
11	Taariq Muhammad	Guard	6–2	170	Junior	Norcross, Georgia
12	Bakari Turner	Guard	6–4	190	Junior	Plano, Texas
14	Jared Ravenscraft	Guard	6–2	195	Sophomore	Morehead, Kentucky
15	Jordan Percell	Forward	6–7	230	Sophomore	Campbellsville, Kentucky
20	Chad Posthumus	Center	6–11	270	Junior	Winnipeg, Manitoba
21	Bruce Reed	Forward	6–7	200	Junior	Olathe, Kansas
22	Angelo Warner	Guard	6–3	200	Sophomore	Orlando, Florida
24	Milton Chavis	Forward	6–6	210	Senior	Raleigh, North Carolina
25	Karam Mashour	Forward	6–6	210	Junior	Nazareth, Israel
30	Jourdan Stickler	Guard	6–4	190	Freshman	Annapolis, Maryland
32	Brent Arrington	Guard	6–2	180	Sophomore	Halethorpe, Maryland

== Schedule ==
Date time, TV	Opponent	Result	Record	Site (attendance) city, state
Exhibition
11/03/2012*; 7:30 pm	St. Catharine	W 71–54		Ellis Johnson Arena; Morehead, KY
Regular season
11/09/2012*; 5:45 pm	at Long Island; Barclays Center Classic	W 77–74	1–0	Barclays Center (N/A); Brooklyn, NY
11/12/2012*; 8:00 pm, ESPN3	at Maryland; Barclays Center Classic	L 45–67	1–1	Comcast Center (8,724); College Park, MD
11/15/2012*; 7:00 pm	Alice Lloyd	W 101–50	2–1	Ellis Johnson Arena (1,430); Morehead, KY
11/18/2012*; 2:00 pm	Lafayette; Barclays Center Classic	W 88–74	3–1	Ellis Johnson Arena (2,431); Morehead, KY
11/21/2012*; 7:00 pm, ESPN3	at No. 8 Kentucky; Barclays Center Classic	L 70–81	3–2	Rupp Arena (21,897); Lexington, KY
11/26/2012*; 7:00 pm	Norfolk State	W 73–67	4–2	Ellis Johnson Arena (2,375); Morehead, KY
11/28/2012*; 7:00 pm	Marshall	L 67–70	4–3	Ellis Johnson Arena (5,877); Morehead, KY
12/01/2012*; 2:00 pm	at Wright State	L 57–66	4–4	Nutter Center (2,807); Dayton, OH
12/05/2012*; 7:00 pm	North Dakota State	L 57–69	4–5	Ellis Johnson Arena (1,240); Morehead, KY
12/08/2012*; 2:00 pm	Indiana State	W 71–63	5–5	Ellis Johnson Arena (2,038); Morehead, KY
12/19/2012*; 8:00 pm	at South Dakota	L 75–85	5–6	DakotaDome (1,578); Vermillion, SD
12/21/2012*; 8:00 pm	at North Dakota State	L 49–69	5–7	Bison Sports Arena (2,214); Fargo, ND
12/28/2012*; 7:30 pm	at Southern Miss	L 58–94	5–8	Ellis Johnson Arena (3,012); Morehead, KY
12/30/2012*; 2:00 pm	at Union (KY)	W 114–67	6–8	Ellis Johnson Arena (1,230); Morehead, KY
01/03/2013; 7:00 pm	SIU Edwardsville	W 68–64	7–8 (1–0)	Ellis Johnson Arena (1,716); Morehead, KY
01/05/2013; 7:30 pm	Eastern Illinois	W 65–50	8–8 (2–0)	Ellis Johnson Arena (1,868); Morehead, KY
01/09/2013; 8:00 pm	at Austin Peay	L 81–84 ^{OT}	8–9 (2–1)	Dunn Center (2,004); Clarksville, TN
01/12/2013; 7:00 pm	at Eastern Kentucky	L 52–59	8–10 (2–2)	Alumni Coliseum (5,300); Richmond, KY
01/17/2013; 8:00 pm	at Southeast Missouri State	W 75–59	9–10 (3–2)	Show Me Center (1,856); Cape Girardeau, MO
01/19/2013; 7:00 pm	at Tennessee–Martin	W 88–74	10–10 (4–2)	Skyhawk Arena (2,108); Martin, TN
01/24/2013; 7:00 pm	Belmont	L 63–64	10–11 (4–3)	Ellis Johnson Arena (3,412); Morehead, KY
01/26/2013; 7:30 pm	Tennessee State	W 78–69	11–11 (5–3)	Ellis Johnson Arena (3,403); Morehead, KY
01/31/2013; 8:00 pm	at Belmont	L 74–93	11–12 (5–4)	Curb Event Center (2,565); Nashville, TN
02/02/2013; 5:30 pm	at Jacksonville State	L 59–70	11–13 (5–5)	Pete Mathews Coliseum (2,743); Jacksonville, AL
02/09/2013; 7:30 pm	Eastern Kentucky	L 47–68	11–14 (5–6)	Ellis Johnson Arena (4,308); Morehead, KY
02/14/2013; 7:00 pm	Jacksonville State	W 85–81	12–14 (6–6)	Ellis Johnson Arena (1,321); Morehead, KY
02/16/2013; 7:30 pm	Tennessee Tech	W 65–63	13–14 (7–6)	Ellis Johnson Arena (2,345); Morehead, KY
02/20/2013; 7:00 pm, ESPN3	Murray State	L 100–106 ^{2OT}	13–15 (7–7)	Ellis Johnson Arena (3,317); Morehead, KY
02/23/2013*; 5:00 pm	at Oakland; BracketBusters	L 79–82 ^{OT}	13–16	Athletics Center O'rena (2,425); Rochester, MI
02/28/2013; 7:00 pm, ESPNU	at Tennessee State	W 101–100	14–16 (8–7)	Gentry Complex (3,578); Nashville, TN
03/02/2013; 8:30 pm	at Tennessee Tech	L 66–72	14–17 (8–8)	Eblen Center (2,460); Cookeville, TN
2013 OVC Basketball tournament
03/06/2013; 7:00 pm	vs. Tennessee–Martin; First Round	W 73–66	15–17	Nashville Municipal Auditorium (1,010); Nashville, TN
03/07/2013; 7:00 pm	vs. Tennessee State; Quarterfinals	L 75–88	15–18	Nashville Municipal Auditorium (1,398); Nashville, TN
*Non-conference game. ^{#}Rankings from AP Poll. (#) Tournament seedings in parentheses. All times are in Eastern Time.
