= 2012–13 Jacksonville State Gamecocks men's basketball team =

American college basketball season

2012–13 Jacksonville State Gamecocks men's basketball
- Conference: Ohio Valley Conference
- Record: 17–11 (8–8 OVC)
- Head coach: James Green (5th season)
- Assistant coaches: Tom Schuberth; Reggie Sharp; Eugene Harris
- Home arena: Pete Mathews Coliseum

2012–13 Ohio Valley Conference men's basketball standings
| | Conf. | | | | Overall |
| Team | W | | L | PCT | W | | L | PCT |
|---|---|---|---|---|---|---|---|---|
East
| Belmont † | 14 | – | 2 | .875 | 26 | – | 7 | .788 |
| Eastern Kentucky | 12 | – | 4 | .750 | 25 | – | 10 | .714 |
| Tennessee State | 11 | – | 5 | .688 | 18 | – | 15 | .545 |
| Jacksonville State* | 8 | – | 8 | .500 | 17 | – | 11 | .607 |
| Morehead State | 8 | – | 8 | .500 | 15 | – | 18 | .455 |
| Tennessee Tech | 5 | – | 11 | .313 | 12 | – | 17 | .414 |
West
| Murray State | 10 | – | 6 | .625 | 21 | – | 10 | .677 |
| Southeast Missouri State | 8 | – | 8 | .500 | 17 | – | 16 | .515 |
| Eastern Illinois | 6 | – | 10 | .375 | 11 | – | 21 | .344 |
| SIU Edwardsville | 5 | – | 11 | .313 | 9 | – | 18 | .333 |
| UT Martin | 5 | – | 11 | .313 | 9 | – | 21 | .300 |
| Austin Peay | 4 | – | 12 | .250 | 8 | – | 23 | .258 |
† 2013 OVC tournament winner As of March 23, 2013 * Ineligible for Postseason play due to APR Penalties; Rankings from AP Poll

The 2012–13 Jacksonville State Gamecocks men's basketball team represented Jacksonville State University during the 2012–13 NCAA Division I men's basketball season. The Gamecocks, led by fifth-year head coach James Green, played their home games at the Pete Mathews Coliseum and were members of the Ohio Valley Conference.

Due to low Academic Progress Rate scores, the Gamecocks were ineligible to participate in postseason play, including the Ohio Valley Tournament. They finished the season 17–11, 8–8 in OVC play to finish in fourth place in the East Division.

== Roster ==
| Number | Name | Position | Height | Weight | Year | Hometown |
|---|---|---|---|---|---|---|
| 2 | Ronnie Boggs | Guard | 6–4 | 172 | Senior | Kansas City, Missouri |
| 3 | Alex Anderson | Guard | 5–11 | 175 | Freshman | Memphis, Tennessee |
| 4 | Tarvin Gaines | Forward | 6–6 | 225 | Senior | West Memphis, Arkansas |
| 5 | Mason Leggett | Guard | 6–0 | 180 | Senior | Zachary, Louisiana |
| 10 | Gus Klaus | Guard | 6–1 | 175 | Freshman | Jackson, Missouri |
| 11 | Darion Rackley | Guard | 6–2 | 160 | Sophomore | St. Louis, Missouri |
| 12 | Rico Sanders | Guard | 6–2 | 180 | Junior | College Park, Georgia |
| 13 | Chris Deanes | Guard | 5–11 | 175 | Freshman | Memphis, Tennessee |
| 14 | Rinaldo Mafra | Forward | 6–7 | 220 | Senior | Recife, Brazil |
| 20 | Giovanni Smith | Guard | 6–1 | 190 | Junior | Manchester, Jamaica |
| 21 | Brian Williams | Guard | 6–1 | 185 | Junior | Lawrenceville, Georgia |
| 22 | Mike Louder | Forward | 6–9 | 185 | Freshman | Henderson, Nevada |
| 24 | Darrius Moore | Forward | 6–8 | 252 | Freshman | Memphis, Tennessee |
| 25 | Rod McReynolds | Guard | 5–8 | 150 | Junior | Douglasville, Georgia |
| 31 | Teraes Clemmons | Guard/forward | 6–6 | 220 | Junior | Mt. Juliet, Tennessee |
| 32 | Joe Kuligoski | Guard/forward | 6–5 | 205 | Freshman | Orland Park, Illinois |
| 33 | Nick Cook | Forward | 6–6 | 220 | Junior | Hattiesburg, Mississippi |

== Schedule ==
| Date time, TV | Opponent | Result | Record | Site (attendance) city, state |
Exhibition
| 11/01/2012*; 7:00 pm | William Carey | W 75–58 | | Pete Mathews Coliseum (876); Jacksonville, AL |
| 11/05/2012*; 7:45 pm | West Georgia | W 72–56 | | Pete Mathews Coliseum (N/A); Jacksonville, AL |
Regular season
| 11/09/2012*; 8:00 pm | Reinhardt | W 93–63 | 1–0 | Pete Mathews Coliseum (1,109); Jacksonville, AL |
| 11/11/2012*; 3:00 pm | Eastern Michigan | W 61–54 | 2–0 | Pete Mathews Coliseum (1,032); Jacksonville, AL |
| 11/15/2012*; 8:00 pm | Alabama A&M | W 79–61 | 3–0 | Pete Mathews Coliseum (1,985); Jacksonville, AL |
| 11/17/2012*; 10:00 pm | at No. 18 UNLV; Global Sports Classic | L 58–77 | 3–1 | Thomas & Mack Center (15,316); Paradise, NV |
| 11/19/2012*; 11:00 pm, Pac-12 Network | at Oregon; Global Sports Classic | L 45–67 | 3–2 | Matthew Knight Arena (5,163); Eugene, OR |
| 11/23/2012*; 3:30 pm | vs. Northern Arizona; Global Sports Classic | W 50–48 | 4–2 | Thomas & Mack Center (N/A); Paradise, NV |
| 11/24/2012*; 3:30 pm | vs. North Carolina A&T; Global Sports Classic | W 54–50 ^{OT} | 5–2 | Thomas & Mack Center (N/A); Paradise, NV |
| 12/01/2012*; 4:00 pm | at Alcorn State | W 56–52 | 6–2 | Davey Whitney Complex (424); Lorman, MS |
| 12/11/2012*; 7:00 pm | Martin Methodist | W 79–64 | 7–2 | Pete Mathews Coliseum (3,213); Jacksonville, AL |
| 12/15/2012*; 6:00 pm | at Presbyterian | W 66–59 ^{OT} | 8–2 | Templeton Center (504); Clinton, SC |
| 12/18/2012*; 8:00 pm, BTN | at Nebraska | L 55–59 | 8–3 | Bob Devaney Sports Center (7,979); Lincoln, NE |
| 12/29/2012; 4:30 pm | Tennessee Tech | W 83–62 | 9–3 (1–0) | Pete Mathews Coliseum (1,229); Jacksonville, AL |
| 12/31/2012; 4:30 pm | at Tennessee–Martin | W 64–54 | 10–3 (2–0) | Skyhawk Arena (901); Martin, TN |
| 01/03/2013; 7:00 pm | Belmont | L 62–73 | 10–4 (2–1) | Pete Mathews Coliseum (819); Jacksonville, AL |
| 01/05/2013; 4:30 pm | Tennessee State | L 57–66 | 10–5 (2–2) | Pete Mathews Coliseum (1,001); Jacksonville, AL |
| 01/10/2013; 7:00 pm | SIU Edwardsville | W 75–62 | 11–5 (3–2) | Vadalabene Center (1,903); Edwardsville, IL |
| 01/12/2013; 6:15 pm | Eastern Illinois | W 61–55 | 12–5 (4–2) | Lantz Arena (1,366); Charleston, IL |
| 01/17/2013; 7:00 pm | at Tennessee State | L 60–66 | 12–6 (4–3) | Gentry Complex (1,236); Nashville, TN |
| 01/19/2013; 1:30 pm | Eastern Kentucky | L 62–73 | 12–7 (4–4) | Pete Mathews Coliseum (1,801); Jacksonville, AL |
| 01/24/2013; 7:00 pm | Austin Peay | W 81–74 | 13–7 (5–4) | Pete Mathews Coliseum (1,883); Jacksonville, AL |
| 01/26/2013; 4:30 pm, ESPN3 | Murray State | W 65–64 | 14–7 (6–4) | Pete Mathews Coliseum (3,478); Jacksonville, AL |
| 02/02/2013; 4:30 pm | Morehead State | W 70–59 | 15–7 (7–4) | Pete Mathews Coliseum (2,743); Jacksonville, AL |
| 02/09/2013; 7:30 pm | at Tennessee Tech | L 64–78 | 15–8 (7–5) | Eblen Center (3,101); Cookeville, TN |
| 02/14/2013; 6:00 pm | at Morehead State | L 81–85 | 15–9 (7–6) | Ellis Johnson Arena (1,321); Morehead, KY |
| 02/16/2013; 6:00 pm | at Eastern Kentucky | L 67–80 | 15–10 (7–7) | Alumni Coliseum (3,100); Richmond, KY |
| 02/20/2013; 7:00 pm | at Southeast Missouri State | W 67–65 | 16–10 (8–7) | Show Me Center (2,013); Cape Girardeau, MO |
| 02/23/2013*; 3:30 pm | at UNC Asheville; BracketBusters | W 71–69 | 17–10 | Kimmel Arena (2,589); Asheville, NC |
| 03/02/2013; 12:00 pm, ESPNU | at Belmont | L 71–78 | 17–11 (8–8) | Curb Event Center (2,584); Nashville, TN |
*Non-conference game. ^{#}Rankings from AP Poll. (#) Tournament seedings in parentheses. All times are in Central Time.
