= 2012–13 Austin Peay Governors basketball team =

American college basketball season

2012–13 Austin Peay Governors men's basketball
- Conference: Ohio Valley Conference
- West Division
- Record: 8–23 (4–12 OVC)
- Head coach: Dave Loos (23rd season)
- Assistant coaches: Bret Campbell; Corey Gipson; Charles Wells
- Home arena: Dunn Center

2012–13 Ohio Valley Conference men's basketball standings
	Conf.				Overall
Team	W		L	PCT	W		L	PCT
East
Belmont †	14	–	2	.875	26	–	7	.788
Eastern Kentucky	12	–	4	.750	25	–	10	.714
Tennessee State	11	–	5	.688	18	–	15	.545
Jacksonville State*	8	–	8	.500	17	–	11	.607
Morehead State	8	–	8	.500	15	–	18	.455
Tennessee Tech	5	–	11	.313	12	–	17	.414
West
Murray State	10	–	6	.625	21	–	10	.677
Southeast Missouri State	8	–	8	.500	17	–	16	.515
Eastern Illinois	6	–	10	.375	11	–	21	.344
SIU Edwardsville	5	–	11	.313	9	–	18	.333
UT Martin	5	–	11	.313	9	–	21	.300
Austin Peay	4	–	12	.250	8	–	23	.258
† 2013 OVC tournament winner As of March 23, 2013 * Ineligible for Postseason play due to APR Penalties; Rankings from AP Poll

The 2012–13 Austin Peay Governors basketball team represented Austin Peay State University during the 2012–13 NCAA Division I men's basketball season. The Governors, led by 23rd year head coach Dave Loos, played their home games at the Dunn Center and were members of the West Division of the Ohio Valley Conference.

They finished the season 8–23, 4–12 in OVC play, placing last in the West Division. They failed to qualify for the Ohio Valley tournament.

== Roster ==
Number	Name	Position	Height	Weight	Year	Hometown
1	Jerome Clyburn	Guard	6–1	180	Senior	Orange Park, Florida
3	Kevin Covington	Guard	6–1	175	Sophomore	Memphis, Tennessee
4	Travis Betran	Guard	6–3	185	Junior	Harlem, New York
5	Chris Horton	Center/Forward	6–8	195	Freshman	Decatur, Georgia
10	Will Triggs	Forward	6–6	230	Junior	Edwardsville, Illinois
11	Thomas Greer	Guard	6–5	180	Sophomore	Atwood, Tennessee
14	Alton Williams	Guard	6–3	190	Junior	Memphis, Tennessee
15	Chris Freeman	Forward	6–6	205	Sophomore	San Antonio, Texas
20	Corey Arentsen	Guard	6–5	185	Freshman	Breese, Illinois
21	Preston Herring	Forward	6–7	180	Freshman	Lester, Alabama
22	Herdie Lawrence	Guard	6–1	175	Sophomore	Lawrenceville, Georgia
23	AJ Lynch	Guard	6–2	170	Freshman	Mobile, Alabama
24	Joe Harms	Forward/Center	6–7	215	Sophomore	Belleville, Illinois
25	Anthony Campbell	Guard/Forward	6–7	215	Senior	Edwardsville, Illinois
33	Matt Hasse	Center	6–9	225	Junior	Naperville, Illinois

== Schedule ==
Date time, TV	Opponent	Result	Record	Site (attendance) city, state
Exhibition
11/03/2012*; 7:30 pm	Central Missouri	W 75–66		Dunn Center; Clarksville, TN
Regular season
11/09/2012*; 7:00 pm	Samford	W 75–64	1–0	Dunn Center (2,315); Clarksville, TN
11/13/2012*; 7:00 pm	at WKU; Cancún Challenge	L 54–74	1–1	E. A. Diddle Arena (4,160); Bowling Green, KY
11/17/2012*; 1:00 pm	at DePaul; Cancún Challenge	L 67–98	1–2	Allstate Arena (7,398); Rosemont, IL
11/20/2012*; 12:30 pm	vs. Western Carolina; Cancún Challenge	W 72–71	2–2	Moon Palace Resort (902); Cancún, Mexico
11/21/2012*; 3:00 pm	vs. Gardner–Webb; Cancún Challenge	L 62–72	2–3	Moon Palace Resort (302); Cancún, Mexico
11/28/2012*; 7:00 pm	Berea	W 108–53	3–3	Dunn Center (2,023); Clarksville, TN
12/01/2012*; 7:30 pm	Fairfield	L 55–74	3–4	Dunn Center (2,208); Clarksville, TN
12/05/2012*; 7:00 pm	Oakland City	W 88–63	4–4	Dunn Center (2,012); Clarksville, TN
12/08/2012*; 12:00 pm	at Memphis	L 65–83	4–5	FedExForum (15,249); Memphis, TN
12/16/2012*; 2:05 pm	at Arkansas State	L 57–69	4–6	Convocation Center (2,652); Jonesboro, AR
12/18/2012*; 7:00 pm	Lipscomb	L 84–87	4–7	Dunn Center (2,498); Clarksville, TN
12/22/2012*; 2:00 pm	at Illinois State	L 57–83	4–8	Redbird Arena (5,119); Normal, IL
12/28/2012*; 3:30 pm	vs. Utah Valley; Dr. Pepper Classic	L 77–84	4–9	McKenzie Arena (2,568); Chattanooga, TN
12/29/2012*; 3:30 pm	vs. High Point; Dr. Pepper Classic	L 74–76	4–10	McKenzie Arena (2,534); Chattanooga, TN
01/03/2013; 7:00 pm	at Southeast Missouri State	L 84–86	4–11 (0–1)	Show Me Center (1,845); Cape Girardeau, MO
01/05/2013; 6:20 pm	at Tennessee–Martin	L 74–76 ^{OT}	4–12 (0–2)	Skyhawk Arena (2,578); Martin, TN
01/09/2013; 7:00 pm	Morehead State	W 84–81 ^{OT}	5–12 (1–2)	Dunn Center (2,004); Clarksville, TN
01/12/2013; 7:30 pm, ESPN3	Murray State	L 68–71	5–13 (1–3)	Dunn Center (4,718); Clarksville, TN
01/17/2013; 7:00 pm	SIU Edwardsville	L 53–66	5–14 (1–4)	Dunn Center (2,014); Clarksville, TN
01/19/2013; 7:30 pm	Eastern Illinois	L 67–77	5–15 (1–5)	Dunn Center (2,517); Clarksville, TN
01/24/2013; 7:00 pm	at Jacksonville State	L 74–81	5–16 (1–6)	Pete Mathews Coliseum (1,883); Jacksonville, AL
01/26/2013; 7:30 pm	at Tennessee Tech	L 52–70	5–17 (1–7)	Eblen Center (2,459); Cookeville, TN
02/02/2013; 12:00 pm, ESPNU	at Murray State	L 68–75 ^{OT}	5–18 (1–8)	CFSB Center (6,111); Murray, KY
02/07/2013; 7:00 pm	Tennessee State	L 82–88 ^{OT}	5–19 (1–9)	Dunn Center (2,186); Clarksville, TN
02/09/2013; 7:30 pm	Belmont	L 65–78	5–20 (1–10)	Dunn Center (4,097); Clarksville, TN
02/14/2013; 7:00 pm	at Eastern Illinois	W 71–64	6–20 (2–10)	Lantz Arena (444); Charleston, IL
02/16/2013; 7:00 pm	at SIU Edwardsville	W 83–71	7–20 (3–10)	Vadalabene Center (2,436); Edwardsville, IL
02/20/2013; 6:00 pm	at Eastern Kentucky	L 53–91	7–21 (3–11)	Alumni Coliseum (3,400); Richmond, KY
02/23/2013*; 3:00 pm	at Liberty; BracketBusters	L 73–79 ^{OT}	7–22	Vines Center (2,678); Lynchburg, VA
02/28/2013; 7:00 pm	Southeast Missouri State	L 81–108	7–23 (3–12)	Dunn Center (1,920); Clarksville, TN
03/02/2013; 7:30 pm	Tennessee–Martin	W 91–58	8–23 (4–12)	Dunn Center (2,408); Clarksville, TN
*Non-conference game. ^{#}Rankings from AP Poll. (#) Tournament seedings in parentheses. All times are in Central Time.
