= 2012–13 Belmont Bruins men's basketball team =

American college basketball season

2012–13 Belmont Bruins men's basketball

Ohio Valley East Division Champions Ohio Valley tournament champions

NCAA Tournament, Round of 64
- Conference: Ohio Valley Conference
- East Division
- Record: 26–7 (14–2 OVC)
- Head coach: Rick Byrd (27th season)
- Assistant coaches: Brian Ayers; James Strong; Mark Price
- Home arena: Curb Event Center

2012–13 Ohio Valley Conference men's basketball standings
| | Conf. | | | | Overall |
| Team | W | | L | PCT | W | | L | PCT |
|---|---|---|---|---|---|---|---|---|
East
| Belmont † | 14 | – | 2 | .875 | 26 | – | 7 | .788 |
| Eastern Kentucky | 12 | – | 4 | .750 | 25 | – | 10 | .714 |
| Tennessee State | 11 | – | 5 | .688 | 18 | – | 15 | .545 |
| Jacksonville State* | 8 | – | 8 | .500 | 17 | – | 11 | .607 |
| Morehead State | 8 | – | 8 | .500 | 15 | – | 18 | .455 |
| Tennessee Tech | 5 | – | 11 | .313 | 12 | – | 17 | .414 |
West
| Murray State | 10 | – | 6 | .625 | 21 | – | 10 | .677 |
| Southeast Missouri State | 8 | – | 8 | .500 | 17 | – | 16 | .515 |
| Eastern Illinois | 6 | – | 10 | .375 | 11 | – | 21 | .344 |
| SIU Edwardsville | 5 | – | 11 | .313 | 9 | – | 18 | .333 |
| UT Martin | 5 | – | 11 | .313 | 9 | – | 21 | .300 |
| Austin Peay | 4 | – | 12 | .250 | 8 | – | 23 | .258 |
† 2013 OVC tournament winner As of March 23, 2013 * Ineligible for Postseason play due to APR Penalties; Rankings from AP Poll

The 2012–13 Belmont Bruins men's basketball team represented Belmont University during the 2012–13 NCAA Division I men's basketball season. The Bruins, led by 27th-year head coach Rick Byrd, played their home games at the Curb Event Center and were first year members of the Ohio Valley Conference in the East Division. They finished the season 26–7, 14–2 in OVC play to be champions of the West Division. They were also champions of the OVC tournament, winning the championship game in overtime over Murray State, to earn their third consecutive trip to the NCAA tournament where they lost in the second round to Arizona.

== Roster ==
2012–13 Belmont Bruins men's basketball team
Players
Coaches

| Pos. | # | Name | Height | Weight | Year | Hometown |
|---|---|---|---|---|---|---|
| C | 0 | Chad Lang | 6 ft 11 in (2.11 m) | 275 lb (125 kg) | RS So | Marietta, Georgia |
| G | 1 | Jeff Laidig | 6 ft 4 in (1.93 m) | 210 lb (95 kg) | Fr | Mishawaka, Indiana |
| F | 2 | Blake Jenkins | 6 ft 7 in (2.01 m) | 210 lb (95 kg) | RS Jr | Knoxville, Tennessee |
| G | 3 | Kerron Johnson | 6 ft 1 in (1.85 m) | 175 lb (79 kg) | Sr | Huntsville, Alabama |
| G | 4 | Holden Mobley | 6 ft 3 in (1.91 m) | 200 lb (91 kg) | RS So | Nashville, Tennessee |
| G | 5 | Caleb Chowbay | 6 ft 2 in (1.88 m) | 170 lb (77 kg) | Fr | Mt. Juliet, Tennessee |
| G | 11 | Spencer Turner | 6 ft 3 in (1.91 m) | 185 lb (84 kg) | So | Bloomington, Indiana |
| F | 14 | J. J. Mann | 6 ft 6 in (1.98 m) | 210 lb (95 kg) | RS Jr | Smyrna, Georgia |
| G | 21 | Ian Clark | 6 ft 3 in (1.91 m) | 175 lb (79 kg) | Sr | Memphis, Tennessee |
| G | 22 | Reece Chamberlain | 6 ft 1 in (1.85 m) | 175 lb (79 kg) | RS So | Goodlettsville, Tennessee |
| G | 23 | Craig Bradshaw | 6 ft 3 in (1.91 m) | 205 lb (93 kg) | Fr | Franklin, Tennessee |
| G | 24 | Adam Barnes | 6 ft 2 in (1.88 m) | 190 lb (86 kg) | RS Sr | Clarksville, Tennessee |
| F | 30 | Trevor Noack | 6 ft 7 in (2.01 m) | 240 lb (109 kg) | Sr | Keller, Texas |
| F | 33 | Drew Windler (redshirt) | 6 ft 9 in (2.06 m) | 205 lb (93 kg) | Jr | South Milwaukee, Wisconsin |
| F | 45 | Brandon Baker | 6 ft 6 in (1.98 m) | 220 lb (100 kg) | RS Sr | Milford, Ohio |

Head coach

- Rick Byrd (Tennessee)

Assistant coach(es)

- Brian Ayers (Lipscomb)
- James Strong (Vanderbilt)
- Mark Price (Samford)

Legend

- (C) Team captain
- (S) Suspended
- (I) Ineligible
- (W) Walk-on
- Injured
- Current redshirt

Roster
Last update: 2013-03-13

== Schedule ==
| Date time, TV | Rank^{#} | Opponent^{#} | Result | Record | Site (attendance) city, state |
Regular season
| 11/09/2012*; 7:30 pm | | at Lipscomb | W 89–60 | 1–0 | Allen Arena (4,685); Nashville, TN |
| 11/13/2012*; 7:00 pm | | Maryville | W 88–49 | 2–0 | Curb Event Center (1,609); Nashville, TN |
| 11/18/2012*; 8:00 pm, P12N | | at Stanford | W 70–62 | 3–0 | Maples Pavilion (4,365); Stanford |
| 11/22/2012*; 1:00 am, CBSSN | | at Alaska Anchorage; Great Alaska Shootout First Round | W 74–60 | 4–0 | Sullivan Arena (4,418); Anchorage, AK |
| 11/23/2012*; 11:00 pm, CBSSN | | vs. Northeastern; Great Alaska Shootout | L 71–74 | 4–1 | Sullivan Arena (4,699); Anchorage, AK |
| 11/24/2012*; 10:00 pm, CBSSN | | vs. Oral Roberts; Great Alaska Shootout | W 70–67 | 5–1 | Sullivan Arena (4,452); Anchorage, AK |
| 12/01/2012*; 7:00 pm | | at VCU | L 65–75 | 5–2 | Stuart C. Siegel Center (7,693); Richmond, VA |
| 12/04/2012*; 7:00 pm, ESPN3 | | Lipscomb | W 100–66 | 6–2 | Curb Event Center (3,196); Nashville, TN |
| 12/13/2012*; 7:00 pm, ESPN3 | | Middle Tennessee | W 64–49 | 7–2 | Curb Event Center (2,562); Nashville, TN |
| 12/15/2012*; 6:00 pm, ESPNU | | at No. 9 Kansas | L 60–89 | 7–3 | Allen Fieldhouse (16,300); Lawrence, KS |
| 12/19/2012*; 7:00 pm | | South Dakota State | W 76–49 | 8–3 | Curb Event Center (2,162); Nashville, TN |
| 12/28/2012*; 8:30 pm | | vs. Boston University; UCF Holiday Classic | W 64–48 | 9–3 | UCF Arena (4,401); Orlando, FL |
| 12/29/2012*; 6:30 pm | | at UCF; UCF Holiday Classic | L 63–66 | 9–4 | UCF Arena (4,278); Orlando, FL |
| 01/03/2013; 7:00 pm | | at Jacksonville State | W 73–62 | 10–4 (1–0) | Pete Mathews Coliseum (819); Jacksonville, AL |
| 01/05/2013; 7:45 pm | | at Tennessee Tech | W 83–52 | 11–4 (2–0) | Eblen Center (3,582); Cookeville, TN |
| 01/10/2013; 7:00 pm | | Southeast Missouri State | W 107–72 | 12–4 (3–0) | Curb Event Center (1,923); Nashville, TN |
| 01/12/2013; 4:00 pm | | Tennessee–Martin | W 90–53 | 13–4 (4–0) | Curb Event Center (2,254); Nashville, TN |
| 01/17/2013; 7:00 pm | | Eastern Kentucky | W 83–76 | 14–4 (5–0) | Curb Event Center (2,764); Nashville, TN |
| 01/19/2013; 7:00 pm | | Tennessee State | W 78–66 | 15–4 (6–0) | Curb Event Center (4,102); Nashville, TN |
| 01/24/2013; 6:00 pm | | at Morehead State | W 64–63 | 16–4 (7–0) | Ellis Johnson Arena (3,412); Morehead, KY |
| 01/26/2013; 6:00 pm | | at Eastern Kentucky | W 85–74 | 17–4 (8–0) | Alumni Coliseum (5,500); Richmond, KY |
| 01/31/2013; 7:00 pm | | Morehead State | W 93–74 | 18–4 (9–0) | Curb Event Center (2,565); Nashville, TN |
| 02/02/2013; 7:00 pm | | Tennessee Tech | W 74–52 | 19–4 (10–0) | Curb Event Center (3,641); Nashville, TN |
| 02/07/2013; 7:00 pm, ESPNU | | at Murray State | L 74–79 | 19–5 (10–1) | CFSB Center (7,141); Murray, KY |
| 02/09/2013; 7:30 pm | | at Austin Peay | W 78–65 | 20–5 (11–1) | Dunn Center (4,097); Clarksville, TN |
| 02/14/2013; 6:00 pm, ESPNU | | at Tennessee State | L 69–80 | 20–6 (11–2) | Gentry Complex (3,215); Nashville, TN |
| 02/20/2013; 7:00 pm | | at Eastern Illinois | W 80–49 | 21–6 (12–2) | Lantz Arena (795); Charleston, IL |
| 02/23/2013*; 9:00 pm, ESPN2 | | Ohio; BracketBusters | W 81–62 | 22–6 | Curb Event Center (4,813); Nashville, TN |
| 02/27/2013; 7:00 pm | | SIU Edwardsville | W 73–43 | 23–6 (13–2) | Curb Event Center (1,364); Nashville, TN |
| 03/02/2013; 12:00 pm, ESPNU | | Jacksonville State | W 78–71 | 24–6 (14–2) | Curb Event Center (2,584); Nashville, TN |
2013 OVC Basketball tournament
| 03/08/2013; 6:00 pm, ESPNU | | vs. Tennessee State; Semifinals | W 82–73 | 25–6 | Nashville Municipal Auditorium (3,977); Nashville, TN |
| 03/09/2013; 6:00 pm, ESPN2 | | vs. Murray State; Championship Game | W 70–68 ^{OT} | 26–6 | Nashville Municipal Auditorium (4,590); Nashville, TN |
2013 NCAA tournament
| 03/21/2013; 6:30 pm, TNT | No. (11 W) | vs. No. 21 (6 W) Arizona; Second Round | L 64–81 | 26–7 | EnergySolutions Arena (14,345); Salt Lake City, UT |
*Non-conference game. ^{#}Rankings from AP Poll. (#) Tournament seedings in parentheses. All times are in Central Time. (#) during NCAA Tournament is Seed with Region W=West.
