= 2012–13 Eastern Kentucky Colonels basketball team =

American college basketball season

2012–13 Eastern Kentucky Colonels men's basketball
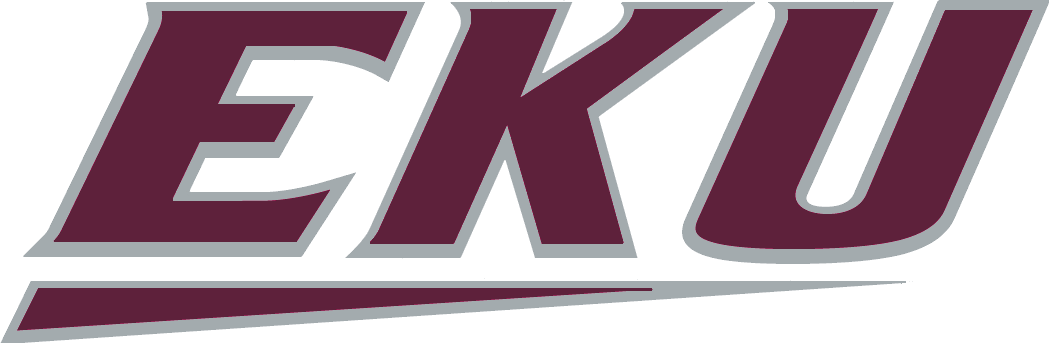

CIT, Second Round
- Conference: Ohio Valley Conference
- East Division
- Record: 25–10 (12–4 OVC)
- Head coach: Jeff Neubauer (8th season)
- Assistant coaches: Rodney Crawford; Austin Newton; Luke Strege
- Home arena: McBrayer Arena

2012–13 Ohio Valley Conference men's basketball standings
	Conf.				Overall
Team	W		L	PCT	W		L	PCT
East
Belmont †	14	–	2	.875	26	–	7	.788
Eastern Kentucky	12	–	4	.750	25	–	10	.714
Tennessee State	11	–	5	.688	18	–	15	.545
Jacksonville State*	8	–	8	.500	17	–	11	.607
Morehead State	8	–	8	.500	15	–	18	.455
Tennessee Tech	5	–	11	.313	12	–	17	.414
West
Murray State	10	–	6	.625	21	–	10	.677
Southeast Missouri State	8	–	8	.500	17	–	16	.515
Eastern Illinois	6	–	10	.375	11	–	21	.344
SIU Edwardsville	5	–	11	.313	9	–	18	.333
UT Martin	5	–	11	.313	9	–	21	.300
Austin Peay	4	–	12	.250	8	–	23	.258
† 2013 OVC tournament winner As of March 23, 2013 * Ineligible for Postseason play due to APR Penalties; Rankings from AP Poll

The 2012–13 Eastern Kentucky Colonels basketball team represented Eastern Kentucky University during the 2012–13 NCAA Division I men's basketball season. The Colonels, led by eighth year head coach Jeff Neubauer, played their home games at McBrayer Arena within Alumni Coliseum and were members of the East Division of the Ohio Valley Conference. They finished the season 25–10, 12–4 in OVC play to finish in second place in the East Division. They advanced to the semifinals of the OVC tournament where they lost to Murray State. They were invited to the 2013 CIT where they defeated Gardner–Webb in the first round before falling in the second round to Evansville.

== Roster ==
Number	Name	Position	Height	Weight	Year	Hometown
0	Glenn Cosey	Guard	6–0	170	Junior	Flint, Michigan
1	Willie Cruz	Guard	6–3	204	Senior	Rochester, New York
2	Corey Walden	Guard	6–2	190	Sophomre	Daytona Beach, Florida
3	Mike DiNunno	Guard	5–11	192	Senior	Chicago, Illinois
11	Jaylen Babb-Harrison	Guard	6–2	172	Freshman	Ajax, Ontario
12	Marcus Lewis	Guard	6–3	185	Junior	Streamwood, Illinois
15	Orlando Williams	Guard	6–4	175	Junior	Cincinnati, Ohio
21	Robbie Stenzel	Guard	6–5	183	Sophomore	Winchester, Kentucky
22	Timmy Knipp	Guard	6–7	204	Sophomore	Olive Hill, Kentucky
23	Ryan Parsons	Guard	6–2	196	Junior	Morgantown, West Virginia
24	Jeff Johnson	Forward	6–7	264	Junior	Champaign, Illinois
33	Deverin Muff	Forward	6–7	207	Sophomore	Strongsville, Ohio
34	Tarius Johnson	Guard	6–5	185	Junior	Jackson, Tennessee
42	Eric Stutz	Forward	6–8	225	Sophomore	Newburgh, Indiana

== Schedule ==
Date time, TV	Opponent	Result	Record	Site (attendance) city, state
Regular season
11/09/2012*; 7:30 pm	Cincinnati Christian; Comfort Suites Invitational	W 89–56	1–0	McBrayer Arena (3,100); Richmond, Kentucky
11/16/2012*; 6:00 pm	Kennesaw State; Comfort Suites Invitational	W 85–71	2–0	McBrayer Arena (1,150); Richmond, Kentucky
11/17/2012*; 6:00 pm	Towson; Comfort Suites Invitational	W 71–69 ^{OT}	3–0	McBrayer Arena (1,400); Richmond, Kentucky
11/18/2012*; 5:00 pm	Radford; Comfort Suites Invitational	W 83–75	4–0	McBrayer Arena (1,050); Richmond, Kentucky
11/24/2012*; 7:00 pm	Norfolk State	W 68–44	5–0	McBrayer Arena (1,225); Richmond, Kentucky
11/28/2012*; 7:00 pm	Delaware State	W 84–51	6–0	McBrayer Arena (1,175); Richmond, Kentucky
12/01/2012*; 7:30 pm	Western Carolina	W 72–70	7–0	McBrayer Arena (1,600); Richmond, Kentucky
12/04/2012*; 7:00 pm	at North Carolina Central	W 63–57	8–0	McLendon–McDougald Gymnasium (1,170); Durham, North Carolina
12/08/2012*; 7:00 pm	at Chattanooga	W 63–52	9–0	McKenzie Arena (2,317); Chattanooga, Tennessee
12/16/2012*; 6:00 pm, ESPNU	at No. 10 Illinois	L 53–66	9–1	Assembly Hall (15,029); Champaign, Illinois
12/19/2012*; 7:00 pm	at North Carolina A&T	L 67–78	9–2	Corbett Sports Center (453); Greensboro, North Carolina
12/21/2012*; 7:00 pm	at High Point	W 73–70	10–2	Millis Center (1,421); High Point, North Carolina
12/30/2012*; 4:00 pm, WTVQ/ESPN3	at West Virginia	L 67–74	10–3	WVU Coliseum (8,123); Morgantown, West Virginia
01/03/2013; 7:00 pm	Eastern Illinois	W 65–54	11–3 (1–0)	McBrayer Arena (1,200); Richmond, Kentucky
01/05/2013; 7:00 pm	SIU Edwardsville	W 78–72	12–3 (2–0)	McBrayer Arena (1,400); Richmond, Kentucky
01/09/2013; 8:00 pm	at Murray State	W 77–65	13–3 (3–0)	CFSB Center (4,052); Murray, Kentucky
01/12/2013; 7:00 pm	Morehead State	W 59–52	14–3 (4–0)	McBrayer Arena (5,300); Richmond, Kentucky
01/17/2013; 8:00 pm	at Belmont	L 76–83	14–4 (4–1)	Curb Event Center (2,764); Nashville, Tennessee
01/19/2013; 2:30 pm	at Jacksonville State	W 73–62	15–4 (5–1)	Pete Mathews Coliseum (1,801); Jacksonville, Alabama
01/24/2013; 7:00 pm	Tennessee State	W 76–67	16–4 (6–1)	McBrayer Arena (2,250); Richmond, Kentucky
01/26/2013; 7:00 pm	Belmont	L 74–85	16–5 (6–2)	McBrayer Arena (5,500); Richmond, Kentucky
01/31/2013; 8:00 pm	at Tennessee–Martin	L 65–72	16–6 (6–3)	Skyhawk Arena (1,341); Martin, Tennessee
02/02/2013; 6:30 pm	at Southeast Missouri State	W 81–72	17–6 (7–3)	Show Me Center (2,922); Cape Girardeau, Missouri
02/05/2013*; 7:00 pm	Crowley's Ridge	W 97–31	18–6	McBrayer Arena (1,050); Richmond, Kentucky
02/09/2013; 7:30 pm	at Morehead State	W 68–47	19–6 (8–3)	Ellis Johnson Arena (4,308); Morehead, Kentucky
02/14/2013; 7:00 pm	Tennessee Tech	W 80–69	20–6 (9–3)	McBrayer Arena (2,350); Richmond, Kentucky
02/16/2013; 7:00 pm	Jacksonville State	W 80–67	21–6 (10–3)	McBrayer Arena (3,100); Richmond, Kentucky
02/20/2013; 7:00 pm	Austin Peay	W 91–53	22–6 (11–3)	McBrayer Arena (3,400); Richmond, Kentucky
02/23/2013*; 1:00 pm, ESPNU	at Valparaiso; BracketBusters	L 60–82	22–7	Athletics–Recreation Center (3,329); Valparaiso, Indiana
02/28/2013; 8:30 pm	at Tennessee Tech	W 69–54	23–7 (12–3)	Eblen Center (2,295); Cookeville, Tennessee
03/02/2013; 8:45 pm	at Tennessee State	L 81–85 ^{OT}	23–8 (12–4)	Gentry Complex (2,771); Nashville, Tennessee
2013 OVC Basketball tournament
03/07/2013; 9:30 pm	vs. Southeast Missouri State; Quarterfinals	W 84–69	24–8	Nashville Municipal Auditorium (1,398); Nashville, Tennessee
03/08/2013; 9:00 pm, ESPN3	vs. Murray State; Semifinals	L 73–81	24–9	Nashville Municipal Auditorium (3,977); Nashville, Tennessee
2013 CIT
03/19/2013*; 7:00 pm	at Gardner–Webb; First Round	W 69–62	25–9	Paul Porter Arena (2,650); Boiling Springs, North Carolina
03/23/2013*; 1:30 pm	at Evansville; Second Round	L 72–86	25–10	Ford Center (1,651); Evansville, Indiana
*Non-conference game. ^{#}Rankings from AP Poll. (#) Tournament seedings in parentheses. All times are in Eastern Time.
