= 2012–13 Eastern Illinois Panthers men's basketball team =

American college basketball season

2012–13 Eastern Illinois Panthers men's basketball
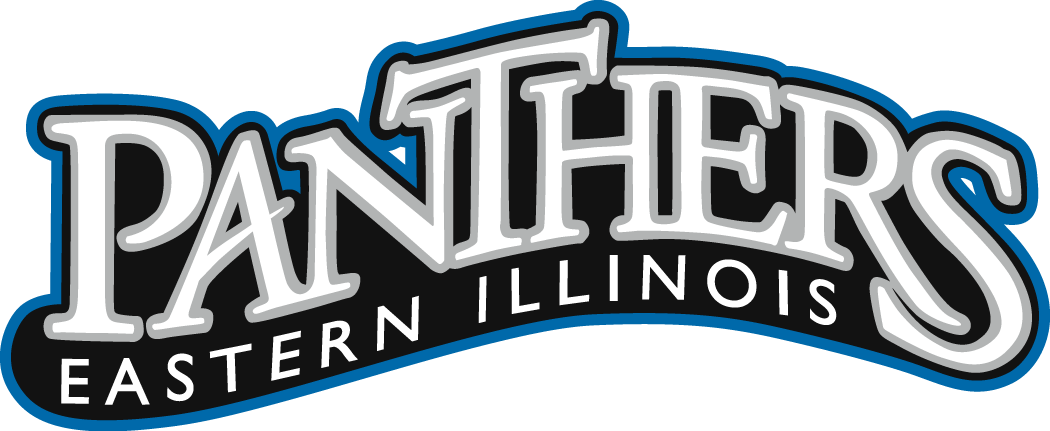
- Conference: Ohio Valley Conference
- West Division
- Record: 11–21 (6–10 OVC)
- Head coach: Jay Spoonhour (1st season)
- Assistant coaches: Bob Sundvold; Dejan (Dan) Matic; Emanuel Dildy
- Home arena: Lantz Arena

2012–13 Ohio Valley Conference men's basketball standings
| | Conf. | | | | Overall |
| Team | W | | L | PCT | W | | L | PCT |
|---|---|---|---|---|---|---|---|---|
East
| Belmont † | 14 | – | 2 | .875 | 26 | – | 7 | .788 |
| Eastern Kentucky | 12 | – | 4 | .750 | 25 | – | 10 | .714 |
| Tennessee State | 11 | – | 5 | .688 | 18 | – | 15 | .545 |
| Jacksonville State* | 8 | – | 8 | .500 | 17 | – | 11 | .607 |
| Morehead State | 8 | – | 8 | .500 | 15 | – | 18 | .455 |
| Tennessee Tech | 5 | – | 11 | .313 | 12 | – | 17 | .414 |
West
| Murray State | 10 | – | 6 | .625 | 21 | – | 10 | .677 |
| Southeast Missouri State | 8 | – | 8 | .500 | 17 | – | 16 | .515 |
| Eastern Illinois | 6 | – | 10 | .375 | 11 | – | 21 | .344 |
| SIU Edwardsville | 5 | – | 11 | .313 | 9 | – | 18 | .333 |
| UT Martin | 5 | – | 11 | .313 | 9 | – | 21 | .300 |
| Austin Peay | 4 | – | 12 | .250 | 8 | – | 23 | .258 |
† 2013 OVC tournament winner As of March 23, 2013 * Ineligible for Postseason play due to APR Penalties; Rankings from AP Poll

The 2012–13 Eastern Illinois Panthers men's basketball team represented Eastern Illinois University during the 2012–13 NCAA Division I men's basketball season. The Panthers, led by first year head coach Jay Spoonhour, played their home games at Lantz Arena and were members of the West Division of the Ohio Valley Conference. They finished the season 11–21, 6–10 in OVC play to finish in third place in the West Division. They lost in the first round of the Ohio Valley Conference tournament to Southeast Missouri State.

== Roster ==
| Number | Name | Position | Height | Weight | Year | Hometown |
|---|---|---|---|---|---|---|
| 2 | Alex Lubsey | Forward | 6–6 | 185 | Junior | Kingston, Jamaica |
| 4 | Reggie Smith | Guard | 6–0 | 185 | Junior | Chicago, Illinois |
| 5 | Malcolm Herron | Guard | 6–4 | 204 | Senior | Maywood, Illinois |
| 10 | Dennis Green | Guard | 6–3 | 185 | Freshman | The Bronx, New York |
| 12 | Keenan Anderson | Forward | 6–7 | 225 | Sophomore | Marion, Arkansas |
| 15 | Sherman Blanford | Forward | 6–6 | 215 | Junior | Philadelphia, Pennsylvania |
| 20 | Morris Woods | Guard | 6–3 | 190 | Junior | Chicago, Illinois |
| 21 | Austin Akers | Guard | 6–2 | 195 | Senior | Brazil, Indiana |
| 22 | Taylor Jones | Guard | 6–2 | 170 | Senior | Rochester, Illinois |
| 23 | R.J. McGhee | Forward | 6–6 | 190 | Junior | Baton Rouge, Louisiana |
| 24 | Cameron Harvey | Guard | 6–3 | 190 | Freshman | Chicago, Illinois |
| 31 | Alex Austin | Guard | 6–4 | 190 | Freshman | Chicago, Illinois |
| 32 | Jonathan Miller | Guard | 6–2 | 180 | Senior | Upper Marlboro, Maryland |
| 34 | Miles Holmes | Forward | 6–7 | 195 | Freshman | Kennett Square, Pennsylvania |
| 55 | Josh Piper | Forward | 6–8 | 225 | Sophomore | Champaign, Illinois |

== Schedule ==
| Date time, TV | Opponent | Result | Record | Site (attendance) city, state |
Exhibition
| 11/05/2012*; 7:00 pm | Trinity International | W 87–34 | | Lantz Arena (509); Charleston, IL |
Regular season
| 11/09/2012*; 8:00 pm, Bradley TV | at Bradley | L 53–76 | 0–1 | Carver Arena (6,634); Peoria, IL |
| 11/13/2012*; 7:00 pm | Wright State | L 44–56 | 0–2 | Lantz Arena (806); Charleston, IL |
| 11/16/2012*; 8:00 pm | at Eastern Michigan; EMU "Ice Man" Classic | L 52–60 | 0–3 | Convocation Center (881); Ypsilanti, MI |
| 11/17/2012*; 3:30 pm | vs. Texas–Pan American; EMU "Ice Man" Classic | W 63–50 | 1–3 | Convocation Center (83); Ypsilanti, MI |
| 11/18/2012*; 3:30 pm | vs. IPFW; EMU "Ice Man" Classic | W 68–67 | 2–3 | Convocation Center (364); Ypsilanti, MI |
| 11/21/2012*; 1:00 pm | Rochester; EMU "Ice Man" Classic | L 56–59 | 2–4 | Lantz Arena (437); Charleston, IL |
| 11/24/2012*; 2:00 pm | Houston Baptist | W 64–44 | 3–4 | Lantz Arena (226); Charleston, IL |
| 11/28/2012*; 7:00 pm | Central Arkansas | L 72–74 | 3–5 | Lantz Arena (811); Charleston, IL |
| 12/01/2012*; 1:00 pm | at Stony Brook | L 52–66 | 3–6 | Pritchard Gymnasium (1,323); Stony Brook, NY |
| 12/05/2012*; 7:00 pm | Western Illinois | L 45–57 | 3–7 | Lantz Arena (1,061); Charleston, IL |
| 12/08/2012*; 6:00 pm | Toledo | L 59–67 | 3–8 | Lantz Arena (963); Charleston, IL |
| 12/19/2012*; 7:00 pm | at Saint Louis | L 45–72 | 3–9 | Chaifetz Arena (5,072); St. Louis, MO |
| 12/22/2012*; 2:05 pm | at Drake | L 56–74 | 3–10 | Knapp Center (2,669); Des Moines, IA |
| 12/29/2012; 7:45 pm | at Tennessee State | L 59–67 | 3–11 (0–1) | Gentry Complex (1,159); Nashville, TN |
| 01/03/2013; 6:00 pm | at Eastern Kentucky | L 54–65 | 3–12 (0–2) | Alumni Coliseum (1,200); Richmond, KY |
| 01/05/2013; 6:30 pm | at Morehead State | L 50–65 | 3–13 (0–3) | Ellis Johnson Arena (1,868); Morehead, KY |
| 01/10/2013; 7:00 pm | Tennessee Tech | L 73–77 | 3–14 (0–4) | Lantz Arena (1,004); Charleston, IL |
| 01/12/2013; 6:15 pm | Jacksonville State | L 55–61 | 3–15 (0–5) | Lantz Arena (1,366); Charleston, IL |
| 01/17/2013; 7:00 pm | at Murray State | L 49–70 | 3–16 (0–6) | CFSB Center (3,818); Murray, KY |
| 01/19/2013; 7:30 pm | at Austin Peay | W 77–67 | 4–16 (1–6) | Dunn Center (2,517); Clarksville, TN |
| 01/24/2013; 7:00 pm | Tennessee–Martin | W 69–56 | 5–16 (2–6) | Lantz Arena (1,009); Charleston, IL |
| 01/26/2013; 6:00 pm | Southeast Missouri State | W 78–72 ^{OT} | 6–16 (3–6) | Lantz Arena (1,288); Charleston, IL |
| 02/02/2013; 7:00 pm | at SIU Edwardsville | L 45–49 | 6–17 (3–7) | Vadalabene Center (2,044); Edwardsville, IL |
| 02/07/2013; 7:00 pm | at Tennessee–Martin | W 93–65 | 7–17 (4–7) | Skyhawk Arena (1,007); Martin, TN |
| 02/09/2013; 5:30 pm | at Southeast Missouri State | L 64–77 | 7–18 (4–8) | Show Me Center (2,509); Cape Girardeau, MO |
| 02/14/2013; 7:00 pm | Austin Peay | L 64–71 | 7–19 (4–9) | Lantz Arena (444); Charleston, IL |
| 02/16/2013; 6:15 pm, ESPN3 | Murray State | W 79–70 | 8–19 (5–9) | Lantz Arena (2,455); Charleston, IL |
| 02/20/2013; 7:00 pm | Belmont | L 49–80 | 8–20 (5–10) | Lantz Arena (795); Charleston, IL |
| 02/23/2013*; 3:00 pm | at Northern Illinois; BracketBusters | W 59–47 | 9–20 | Convocation Center (1,009); DeKalb, IL |
| 02/26/2013*; 7:05 pm, Lakeshore PTV/ESPN3 | at Chicago State | W 58–50 | 10–20 | Emil and Patricia Jones Convocation Center (480); Chicago, IL |
| 03/02/2013; 4:00 pm | SIU Edwardsville | W 61–46 | 11–20 (6–10) | Lantz Arena (N/A); Charleston, IL |
2013 OVC Basketball tournament
| 03/06/2013; 8:30 pm | vs. Southeast Missouri State; First Round | L 68–78 | 11–21 | Nashville Municipal Auditorium (1,010); Nashville, TN |
*Non-conference game. ^{#}Rankings from AP Poll. (#) Tournament seedings in parentheses. All times are in Central Time.
