= Southeast Missouri State Redhawks men's basketball statistical leaders =

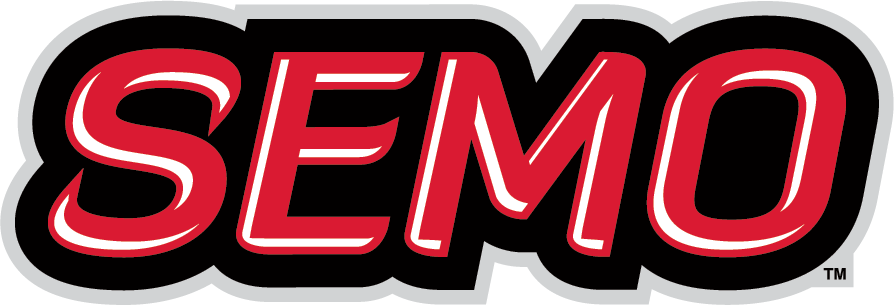

The Southeast Missouri State Redhawks men's basketball statistical leaders are individual statistical leaders of the Southeast Missouri State Redhawks men's basketball program in various categories, including points, assists, blocks, rebounds, and steals. Within those areas, the lists identify single-game, single-season, and career leaders. The Redhawks represent Southeast Missouri State University in the NCAA's Ohio Valley Conference.

Southeast Missouri State began competing in intercollegiate basketball in 1903. However, the school's record book does not generally list records from before the 1950s, as records from before this period are often incomplete and inconsistent. Since scoring was much lower in this era, and teams played much fewer games during a typical season, it is likely that few or no players from this era would appear on these lists anyway.

The NCAA did not officially record assists as a stat until the 1983–84 season, and blocks and steals until the 1985–86 season, but Southeast Missouri State's record books includes players in these stats before these seasons. These lists are updated through the end of the 2020–21 season.

== Scoring ==
Career
Rk	Player	Points	Seasons
1	Carl Ritter	1,916	1959–60 1960–61 1961–62 1962–63
2	Jewell Crawford	1,862	1980–81 1981–82 1982–83 1983–84
3	Bill Giessing	1,686	1959–60 1960–61 1961–62 1962–63
4	William “Bud” Eley	1,611	1995–96 1996–97 1997–98 1998–99
5	Antonius Cleveland	1,556	2013–14 2014–15 2015–16 2016–17
6	Tyler Stone	1,546	2011–12 2012–13 2013–14
7	Derek Winans	1,505	2001–02 2002–03 2003–04 2004–05
8	Marland Smith	1,423	2009–10 2010–11 2011–12 2012–13
9	Ronny Rankin	1,277	1984–85 1985–86
10	Riley Ellis	1,241	1984–85 1985–86

Season
Rk	Player	Points	Season
1	Otto Porter	677	1980–81
2	Riley Ellis	667	1985–86
3	Ronny Rankin	656	1985–86
4	Ronny Rankin	621	1984–85
5	Phillip Russell	615	2022–23
6	Jarekious Bradley	608	2013–14
7	Jewell Crawford	606	1983–84
8	Devon Lake	603	1992–93
9	Denzel Mahoney	598	2017–18
10	Roy Booker	594	2005–06

Single game
Rk	Player	Points	Season	Opponent
1	Kermit Meystedt	52	1966–67	McKendree

== Rebounds ==
Career
Rk	Player	Rebounds	Seasons
1	William “Bud” Eley	955	1995–96 1996–97 1997–98 1998–99
2	John Sanchez	839	1976–77 1977–78 1978–79 1979–80
3	Kermit Meystedt	834	1963–64 1964–65 1965–66 1966–67
4	Paul Ranson	815	1961–62 1962–63 1963–64
5	Anthony Thomas	796	1978–79 1979–80 1980–81 1981–82
	Bill Giessing	796	1959–60 1960–61 1961–62 1962–63
7	Tyler Stone	768	2011–12 2012–13 2013–14
8	Dan Milligan	758	1965–66 1966–67 1967–68 1968–69
9	Jewell Crawford	741	1980–81 1981–82 1982–83 1983–84
10	Nino Johnson	730	2011–12 2012–13 2013–14 2014–15

Season
Rk	Player	Rebounds	Season
1	Brandon Griffin	314	2002–03
2	William “Bud” Eley	310	1996–97
	William “Bud” Eley	310	1998–99
4	Riley Ellis	293	1985–86
5	Nino Johnson	289	2012–13
6	Tyler Stone	284	2013–14
7	Derick Turner	282	1986–87
8	Riley Ellis	275	1984–85
9	Roderick Johnson	266	1999–00
10	William “Bud” Eley	260	1995–96

Single game
Rk	Player	Rebounds	Season	Opponent
1	Paul Ranson	29	1961–62	MacMurray

== Assists ==
Career
Rk	Player	Assists	Seasons
1	Lucas Nutt	610	2009–10 2010–11 2011–12 2012–13 2013–14
2	Dwayne Rutherford	541	1986–87 1987–88 1988–89 1989–90
3	Michael Morris	478	1984–85 1985–86 1986–87 1987–88
4	Dave Shipley	396	1975–76 1976–77 1977–78 1978–79
5	Jerry Freshwater	367	1991–92 1992–93 1993–94 1994–95
6	Joe Cagle	357	1973–74 1974–75 1975–76 1976–77
7	John Sanchez	327	1976–77 1977–78 1978–79 1979–80
8	Anthony Venson	321	1980–81 1981–82 1982–83 1983–84
9	Jonathan Dalton	315	2016–17 2017–18 2018–19
10	Derek Winans	282	2001–02 2002–03 2003–04 2004–05

Season
Rk	Player	Assists	Season
1	Dwayne Rutherford	200	1988–89
2	Lucas Nutt	191	2013–14
3	Kevin Roberts	179	2002–03
4	Lucas Nutt	178	2012–13
5	Phillip Russell	174	2022–23
6	Jonathan Dalton	168	2017–18
7	Jerry Freshwater	153	1994–95
8	Rob Martin	147	2024–25
9	Dwayne Rutherford	143	1987–88
10	Michael Morris	139	1986–87

Single game
Rk	Player	Assists	Season/Opponent
1	2	13	Most recent: Kevin Roberts, 2002–03 vs. Morehead State

== Steals ==
Career
Rk	Player	Steals	Seasons
1	Michael Morris	191	1984–85 1985–86 1986–87 1987–88
2	Antonius Cleveland	159	2013–14 2014–15 2015–16 2016–17
3	Derek Winans	153	2001–02 2002–03 2003–04 2004–05
	Dwayne Rutherford	153	1986–87 1987–88 1988–89 1989–90
5	William “Bud” Eley	135	1995–96 1996–97 1997–98 1998–99
6	Jerry Freshwater	121	1991–92 1992–93 1993–94 1994–95
7	Marland Smith	112	2009–10 2010–11 2011–12 2012–13
8	Dainmon Gonner	111	2003–04 2004–05
9	Paul Paradoski	110	2004–05 2005–06 2006–07
10	Nino Johnson	100	2011–12 2012–13 2013–14 2014–15

Season
Rk	Player	Steals	Season
1	Dainmon Gonner	74	2004–05
2	Dwayne Rutherford	71	1988–89
3	Michael Morris	63	1986–87
	Michael Morris	63	1987–88
	Teddy Washington Jr.	63	2024–25
6	William “Bud” Eley	58	1996–97
	Calvert White	58	1996–97
8	Johnnie Coleman	57	1990–91
9	Phillip Russell	54	2022–23
10	Ernest Taylor	50	1988–89

Single game
Rk	Player	Steals	Season	Opponent
1	Teddy Washington Jr.	7	2024–25	Tennessee State
2	Nygal Russell	6	2020–21	SIU Edwardsville
	Jamaal Calvin	6	2016–17	Hannibal-LaGrange
	David Johnson	6	2006–07	UT Martin
	Kevin Roberts	6	2002–03	Tennessee Tech
	Derek Winans	6	2002–03	Tennessee Tech
	Kevin Roberts	6	2002–03	Murray State
	Derek Winans	6	2001–02	Tennessee Tech

== Blocks ==
Career
Rk	Player	Blocks	Seasons
1	Nino Johnson	184	2011–12 2012–13 2013–14 2014–15
2	William “Bud” Eley	156	1995–96 1996–97 1997–98 1998–99
3	Tyler Stone	124	2011–12 2012–13 2013–14
4	Drew Demond	112	1999–00 2000–01 2001–02
5	Leon Powell	92	2010–11 2011–12
6	Anthony Thomas	83	1978–79 1979–80 1980–81 1981–82
7	Reggie Golson	79	2002–03 2003–04 2004–05
8	Antonius Cleveland	76	2013–14 2014–15 2015–16 2016–17
9	Calvin Williams	71	2007–08 2008–09
10	Malcomn Henry	60	1985–86 1986–87 1987–88 1988–89 1989–90

Season
Rk	Player	Blocks	Season
1	Nino Johnson	84	2012–13
2	William “Bud” Eley	75	1998–99
3	Nino Johnson	64	2014–15
	Reggie Golson	64	2004–05
5	William “Bud” Eley	51	1995–96
6	Leon Powell	50	2010–11
7	Drew Demond	48	2000–01
8	Tyler Stone	46	2013–14
9	Anthony Thomas	45	1981–82
10	Tyler Stone	44	2012–13

Single game
Rk	Player	Blocks	Season	Opponent
1	William “Bud” Eley	10	1998–99	Morehead State
