= Barclays Center Classic =

- Sport: College basketball
- Founded: 2012
- No. of teams: 8
- Country: United States
- Venue: Barclays Center
- Most recent champion: Pitt
- Most titles: Cincinnati; Virginia; Ole Miss; Kentucky (1)
- Broadcasters: NBCSN, ASN, Stadium on Facebook

The Barclays Center Classic is an annual early season college basketball tournament that was inaugurated in 2012. Each of the eight schools plays four games, with the bracketed portion of the tournament concluding at the tournament's namesake Barclays Center in Brooklyn, New York.

== History ==
The first tournament was held as a five-team round-robin tournament. Most games were at campus sites; a doubleheader featuring Kentucky and Maryland on ESPN with an undercard game featuring LIU Brooklyn and Morehead State served as the centerpiece of the tournament.

=== Final standings ===
Team	Record	Win %
Kentucky	4–0	1.000
Maryland	3–1	.750
Morehead State	2–2	.500
Lafayette	1–3	.250
Long Island	0–4	.000

== 2013 ==
The 2013 edition was expanded to eight teams, with each team playing four games. Four schools- Penn State, Georgia Tech, Ole Miss, and St. John's advancing to Brooklyn for the semifinals, with the remaining schools playing out a second bracket at a campus site, Monmouth's Multipurpose Activity Center in West Long Branch, New Jersey.

=== Barclays Center bracket ===
Semifinals; November 29; NBCSN
Ole Miss	77
Georgia Tech	67
Penn State	89^{OT}
St. John's	82

Championship; November 30; NBCSN
Ole Miss	79
Penn State	76
Consolation; November 30; NBCSN
Georgia Tech	58
St. John's	69

=== Campus site bracket ===
The campus site portion of the Classic took place at Monmouth's Multipurpose Activity Center in West Long Branch, New Jersey.

Semifinals; November 29
Monmouth	81
Mississippi Valley State	79
North Carolina A&T	85
Longwood	78

Championship; November 30
Monmouth	76
North Carolina A&T	61
Consolation; November 30
Longwood	89
Mississippi Valley State	90

== 2014 ==
The 2014 edition of the Classic is the same as the 2013 edition. Four schools- Rutgers, Vanderbilt, LaSalle, and Virginia will play in Brooklyn for the semifinals, consolation and championship game, with the remaining schools playing out a second bracket at a campus site, the Yanitelli Center in Jersey City, New Jersey.

=== Barclays Center bracket ===
Semifinals; November 28; NBCSN
Rutgers	68
Vanderbilt	65
La Salle	56
Virginia	64

Championship; November 29; NBCSN
Rutgers	26
Virginia	45
Consolation; November 29; NBCSN
Vanderbilt	68
La Salle	55

=== Campus Site Bracket ===
The campus site portion of the Classic took place at Saint Peter's Yanitelli Center in Jersey City, New Jersey.

Semifinals; November 28
St. Francis Brooklyn	70
Norfolk State	72 ^{OT}
Saint Peter's	66
Tennessee State	58

Championship; November 29
Norfolk State	60
Saint Peter's	58
Consolation; November 29
St. Francis Brooklyn	59
Tennessee State	57

== 2015 ==
Four schools: Cincinnati, George Washington, Nebraska and Tennessee will play in Brooklyn for the semifinals, championship and consolation, with the remaining schools playing out a second bracket at Christl Arena in West Point, New York.

The opening round will be played November 22 and 24 at various sites around the country.

=== Opening Round ===
==== November 22, 2015 ====
- Cincinnati 99
- Arkansas–Pine Bluff 50

Fifth Third Arena, Cincinnati, OH

- George Washington 92
- Army 81

Charles E. Smith Center, Washington, D.C.

- Nebraska 92
- Southeastern Louisiana 65

Pinnacle Bank Arena, Lincoln, NE

- Tennessee 89
- Gardner–Webb 64

Thompson-Boling Arena, Knoxville, TN

==== November 24, 2015 ====
- Cincinnati 64
- Southeastern Louisiana 49

Fifth Third Arena, Cincinnati, OH

- George Washington 94
- Gardner–Webb 65

Charles E. Smith Center, Washington, D.C.

- Nebraska 67
- Arkansas–Pine Bluff 44

Pinnacle Bank Arena, Lincoln, NE

- Tennessee 95
- Army 80

Thompson-Boling Arena, Knoxville, TN

==== Barclays Center bracket ====
Semifinals; November 27; ASN
24	Cincinnati	65
Nebraska	61
George Washington	73
Tennessee	70

Championship; November 28; ASN
24	Cincinnati	61
George Washington	56
Consolation; November 28
Nebraska	82
Tennessee	71

Cincinnati won its first title, with George Washington, Nebraska, and Tennessee finishing 2nd, 3rd, and 4th respectively.

=== Campus Site Bracket ===
The campus site portion of the Classic took place at Christl Arena in West Point, New York.

Semifinals; November 27
Gardner–Webb	77
Southeastern Louisiana	68
Army	81
Arkansas–Pine Bluff	60

Championship; November 28
Gardner-Webb	98
Army	103^{OT}
Consolation; November 28
Southeastern Louisiana	60
Arkansas-Pine Bluff	62

== 2016 ==
Four schools: Boston College, Kansas State, Maryland and Richmond will play in Brooklyn for the semifinals, championship and consolation. The opening round will be played November 20 and 22 at various sites.

=== Opening Round ===
==== November 20, 2016 ====
- Boston College 82
- Stony Brook 75

Conte Forum, Chestnut Hill, MA

- Maryland 71
- Towson 66

Xfinity Center, College Park, MD

- Kansas State 89
- Hampton 67

Bramlage Coliseum, Manhattan, KS

- Richmond 81
- Robert Morris 69

Robins Center, Richmond, VA

==== November 22, 2016 ====
- Boston College 80
- Towson 70

Conte Forum, Chestnut Hill, MA

- Maryland 77
- Stony Brook 63

Xfinity Center, College Park, MD

- Kansas State 61
- Robert Morris 40

Bramlage Coliseum, Manhattan, KS

- Richmond 65
- Hampton 52

Robins Center, Richmond, VA

==== Barclays Center bracket ====
Semifinals; November 25; ASN
Kansas State	72
Boston College	54
Maryland	88 OT
Richmond	82

Championship; November 26; ASN
Kansas State	68
Maryland	69
Consolation; November 26; ASN
Boston College	54
Richmond	67

=== Campus Site Bracket ===
The campus site portion of the Classic took place at SECU Arena in Towson, Maryland.

Semifinals; November 25
Towson	88
Stony Brook	63
Hampton	48
Robert Morris	62

Championship; November 26
Towson	66
Robert Morris	67
Consolation; November 26
Stony Brook	76
Hampton	66

== 2017 ==
Four schools: Alabama, BYU, Minnesota, and Massachusetts will play in Brooklyn. The opening round will be played November 17, 18, 19, and 21 at various sites. It was announced that the format of the Barclays Center Classic was changed from a four team tournament to a four team round robin... Barclays Center round games will be played November 25 at the Steinberg Wellness Center on the campus of LIU Brooklyn in Long Island, New York, then November 26 at Barclays Center

=== Opening Round ===
Game 1 November 17; SEC+		Game 6 November 21; SEC Network
			Texas–Arlington	76
Alabama A&M	67	25	Alabama	77
Alabama	104

Game 2 November 18; BYUtv; ESPN3		Game 8 November 21; BYUtv; ESPN3
		Niagara	88
Texas–Arlington	89	BYU	95
BYU	75

Game 3 November 19; Atlantic 10 Digital Network		Game 5 November 21; Atlantic 10 Digital Network
		Western Carolina	76
Niagara	76	UMass	85
UMass	101

Game 4 November 19; Fox Sports 1			Game 7 November 21; Big Ten Network
				Alabama A&M	57
	Western Carolina	81	14	Minnesota	100
14	Minnesota	107

==== Barclays Center Round ====
November 24; Steinberg Wellness Center; Stadium on Facebook
25	Alabama	71
BYU	59
14	Minnesota	69
UMass	51

November 25; Barclays Center; Stadium on Facebook
BYU	68
UMass	66
25	Alabama	84
14	Minnesota	89

=== Campus Site Bracket ===
The campus site portion will take place at Gallagher Center in Lewiston, New York.

Semifinals; November 24
Alabama A&M	74
Niagara	96
Western Carolina	65
Texas–Arlington	89

Championship; November 25
Niagara	90
Texas–Arlington	95
Consolation; November 25
Alabama A&M	72
Western Carolina	82

== 2018 ==
ACCN

November 21
12:00 pm

Pittsburgh 75, Saint Louis 72
Scoring by half: 38–33, 37–40
Pts: Xavier Johnson; Rebs: 2 tied Asts: 2 tied	Pts: Jordan Goodwin; Rebs: Hasahn French; Asts: Jordan Goodwin

Barclays Center
Referees: Lee Cassell, Bill Covington, Mike Eades

== 2019 ==
ESPN2

November 28
4:00 pm

NC State 78, Memphis 83
Scoring by half: 38–55, 28–39
Pts: Markell Johnson; Rebs: Markell Johnson; Asts: Markell Johnson	Pts: Boogie Ellis; Rebs: Alex Lomax; Asts: Precious Achiuwa

Barclays Center
Referees: Lee Cassell, Clarence Armstrong, Don Daily

== See also ==
- Legends Classic (basketball tournament)
