= 2012–13 UT Martin Skyhawks men's basketball team =

American college basketball season

2012–13 Tennessee–Martin Skyhawks men's basketball
- Conference: Ohio Valley Conference
- West Division
- Record: 9–21 (5–11 OVC)
- Head coach: Jason James (4th season)
- Assistant coaches: Cornelius Jackson; Lance Egnatz; Andres Irarrazbal
- Home arena: Skyhawk Arena

2012–13 Ohio Valley Conference men's basketball standings
	Conf.				Overall
Team	W		L	PCT	W		L	PCT
East
Belmont †	14	–	2	.875	26	–	7	.788
Eastern Kentucky	12	–	4	.750	25	–	10	.714
Tennessee State	11	–	5	.688	18	–	15	.545
Jacksonville State*	8	–	8	.500	17	–	11	.607
Morehead State	8	–	8	.500	15	–	18	.455
Tennessee Tech	5	–	11	.313	12	–	17	.414
West
Murray State	10	–	6	.625	21	–	10	.677
Southeast Missouri State	8	–	8	.500	17	–	16	.515
Eastern Illinois	6	–	10	.375	11	–	21	.344
SIU Edwardsville	5	–	11	.313	9	–	18	.333
UT Martin	5	–	11	.313	9	–	21	.300
Austin Peay	4	–	12	.250	8	–	23	.258
† 2013 OVC tournament winner As of March 23, 2013 * Ineligible for Postseason play due to APR Penalties; Rankings from AP Poll

The 2012–13 Tennessee–Martin Skyhawks men's basketball team represented University of Tennessee at Martin during the 2012–13 NCAA Division I men's basketball season. The Skyhawks, led by fourth year head coach Jason James, played their home games at Skyhawk Arena and were members of the West Division of the Ohio Valley Conference.

They finished the season 9–21, 5–11 in OVC play to finish in a tie for fourth place in the West Division. They lost in the first round of the Ohio Valley Conference tournament to Morehead State.

== Roster ==
Number	Name	Position	Height	Weight	Year	Hometown
0	Tobias Dowdell	Forward	6–7	215	Sophomore	Birmingham, Alabama
1	Dee Oldham	Guard	6–4	180	Freshman	Lebanon, Tennessee
2	Khristian Taylor	Guard	6–2	175	Sophomre	Akron, Ohio
3	Terence Smith	Guard	6–4	195	Sophomore	Russellville, Alabama
4	Bobby Jones	Guard	6–3	185	Junior	Memphis, Tennessee
10	Mike Liabo	Guard/Forward	6–6	195	Junior	Naples, Florida
11	Omari Minor	Guard	6–0	175	Junior	Troy, Virginia
15	DeMarc Richardson	Guard	6–2	170	Freshman	Eads, Tennessee
22	Justin Childs	Guard	6–4	190	Junior	New Orleans, Louisiana
25	BJ McLaughlin	Forward	6–6	200	Freshman	Florissant, Missouri
32	Pierre Mopo	Forward	6–7	245	Junior	Pearl, Mississippi
33	Myles Taylor	Forward	6–7	250	Sophomore	Little Rock, Arkansas
35	Corderio Maclin	Forward	6–8	240	Senior	Memphis, Tennessee
53	Jeremy Washington	Forward	6–7	230	Senior	Little Rock, Arkansas

== Schedule ==
Date time, TV	Opponent	Result	Record	Site (attendance) city, state
Exhibition
11/02/2012*; 11:00 am	Illinois College	W 109–79		Skyhawk Arena; Martin, TN
Regular season
11/09/2012*; 8:00 pm	at Arkansas–Little Rock	L 68–84	0–1	Jack Stephens Center (3,812); Little Rock, AR
11/11/2012*; 1:00 pm, FS Ohio	at No. 24 Cincinnati	L 57–80	0–2	Fifth Third Arena (5,728); Cincinnati, OH
11/14/2012*; 7:00 pm	Fontbonne	W 84–58	1–2	Skyhawk Arena (1,133); Martin, TN
11/16/2012*; 7:00 pm	Arkansas State	L 73–77 ^{3OT}	1–3	Skyhawk Arena (2,011); Martin, TN
11/20/2012*; 7:00 pm	Lyon	W 92–58	2–3	Skyhawk Arena (1,071); Martin, TN
11/24/2012*; 1:00 pm	at Bradley	L 57–80	2–4	Carver Arena (6,649); Peroria, IL
11/29/2012*; 7:00 pm	at Memphis	L 65–93	2–5	FedExForum (15,398); Memphis, TN
12/01/2012*; 6:00 pm	Kennesaw State	W 65–63	3–5	Skyhawk Arena (1,638); Martin, TN
12/05/2012*; 7:00 pm	at Central Arkansas	L 86–87	3–6	Farris Center (1,472); Conway, AR
12/08/2012*; 6:30 pm	at Lipscomb	L 62–86	3–7	Allen Arena (2,129); Nashville, TN
12/15/2012*; 7:00 pm	at Saint Louis	L 51–73	3–8	Chaifetz Arena (6,197); St. Louis, MO
12/19/2012*; 7:00 pm	Samford	L 62–75	3–9	Skyhawk Arena (792); Martin, TN
12/29/2012; 12:00 pm	at Southeast Missouri State	L 60–65	3–10 (0–1)	Show Me Center (1,752); Cape Girardeau, MO
12/31/2012; 4:30 pm	Jacksonville State	L 54–64	3–11 (0–2)	Skyhawk Arena (901); Martin, TN
01/03/2013; 7:00 pm, ESPN3	Murray State	L 62–73	3–12 (0–3)	Skyhawk Arena (3,557); Martin, TN
01/05/2013; 6:20 pm	Austin Peay	W 76–74 ^{OT}	4–12 (1–3)	Skyhawk Arena (2,578); Martin, TN
01/10/2013; 7:00 pm	at Tennessee State	L 48–80	4–13 (1–4)	Gentry Complex (812); Nashville, TN
01/12/2013; 4:00 pm	at Belmont	L 53–90	4–14 (1–5)	Curb Event Center (2,254); Nashville, TN
01/19/2013; 6:00 pm	Morehead State	L 74–88	4–15 (1–6)	Pete Mathews Coliseum (2,108); Jacksonville, AL
01/24/2013; 7:00 pm	at Eastern Illinois	L 56–69	4–16 (1–7)	Lantz Arena (1,009); Charleston, IL
01/26/2013; 7:00 pm	at SIU Edwardsville	W 65–62	5–16 (2–7)	Vadalabene Center (1,634); Edwardsville, IL
01/31/2013; 7:00 pm	Eastern Kentucky	W 72–65	6–16 (3–7)	Skyhawk Arena (1,341); Martin, TN
02/07/2013; 7:00 pm	Eastern Illinois	L 65–93	6–17 (3–8)	Skyhawk Arena (1,007); Martin, TN
02/09/2013; 12:00 pm	SIU Edwardsville	W 77–68	7–17 (4–8)	Skyhawk Arena (1,674); Martin, TN
02/16/2013; 6:00 pm	Southeast Missouri State	L 74–96	7–18 (4–9)	Skyhawk Arena (2,541); Martin, TN
02/21/2013; 7:00 pm	at Tennessee Tech	L 68–83	7–19 (4–10)	Eblen Center (1,269); Cookeville, TN
02/23/2013*; 12:00 pm	Longwood; BracketBusters	W 89–79	8–19	Skyhawk Arena (894); Martin, TN
02/28/2013; 7:00 pm	at Murray State	W 69–68	9–19 (5–10)	CFSB Center (4,823); Murray, KY
03/02/2013; 7:30 pm	at Austin Peay	L 58–91	9–20 (5–11)	Dunn Center (2,408); Clarksville, TN
2013 OVC Basketball tournament
03/06/2013; 6:00 pm	vs. Morehead State; First Round	L 66–73	9–21	Nashville Municipal Auditorium (1,010); Nashville, TN
*Non-conference game. ^{#}Rankings from AP Poll. (#) Tournament seedings in parentheses. All times are in Central Time.
