= 2013 Ohio Valley Conference women's basketball tournament =

Sports

- 2012 tournament logo
- Classification: Division I
- Season: 2012–13
- Teams: 8
- Site: Nashville Municipal Auditorium; Nashville, Tennessee
- Champions: Tennessee–Martin (3 title)
- Winning coach: Kevin McMillan (3 title)
- MVP: Jasmine Newsome (Tennessee–Martin)
- Attendance: 3,764
- Television: ESPNU, ESPN2, ESPN3

2012–13 Ohio Valley Conference women's basketball standings
	Conf.				Overall
Team	W		L	PCT	W		L	PCT
East
Tennessee Tech	12	–	4	.750	19	–	12	.613
Eastern Kentucky	11	–	5	.688	18	–	12	.600
Belmont	12	–	5	.706	28	–	24	.538
Tennessee State	9	–	7	.563	14	–	15	.483
Morehead State	5	–	11	.313	9	–	21	.300
Jacksonville State	1	–	15	.063	1	–	27	.036
West
Eastern Illinois	12	–	4	.750	20	–	12	.625
UT Martin †	11	–	5	.688	19	–	15	.559
SIU Edwardsville	9	–	7	.563	16	–	15	.516
Murray State	8	–	8	.500	16	–	13	.552
Southeast Missouri State	1	–	11	.083	11	–	18	.379
Austin Peay	2	–	14	.125	7	–	21	.250
† 2013 OVC tournament winner As of March 23, 2013; Rankings from AP Poll

The 2013 Ohio Valley Conference women's basketball tournament was held March 6 - March 9 at Nashville Municipal Auditorium in Nashville, Tennessee. The University of Tennessee at Martin received the conference's automatic bid to the 2013 NCAA tournament.

== Format ==
The tournament is an eight team tournament with the third and fourth seeds receiving a first round bye and the two divisional winners receiving byes through to the semifinals.

The top team in each division, based on conference winning percentage, automatically earns a berth into the OVC Tournament. The next six teams with the highest conference winning percentage also earn a bid, regardless of division. The 1st seed goes to the divisional winner with the higher conference winning percentage, while the No. 2 seed automatically goes to the other divisional winner. The remaining six teams are seeded 3-8 by conference winning percentage, regardless of division.

== Seeds ==
Seed	School	Conf (Overall)	Tiebreaker
#1	Eastern Illinois	12–4	OVC West Champion, 1-0 vs TTU
#2	Tennessee Tech	12–4	OVC East Champion, 0-1 vs EIU
#3	Belmont	11-5	2-1 vs EKU & UTM
#4	Tennessee–Martin	11–5	1-1 vs Belmont & EKU
#5	Eastern Kentucky	11-5	1–2 vs Belmont & UTM
#6	SIU Edwardsville	9-7	1-0 vs TSU
#7	Tennessee State	9-7	0-1 vs SIUE
#8	Murray State	8-8	

== Bracket ==
First round Wednesday, March 6
5	Eastern Kentucky	62
8	Murray State	51
6	SIU Edwardsville	73
7	Tennessee State	61

Quarterfinals; Thursday, March 7
5	Eastern Kentucky	63
4	Tennessee–Martin	78
6	SIU Edwardsville	45
3	Belmont	62

Semifinals; Friday, March 8
4	Tennessee–Martin	71
1	Eastern Illinois	69
3	Belmont	57
2	Tennessee Tech	61

Championship game Saturday, March 9 ESPN2
4	Tennessee–Martin	87
2	Tennessee Tech	80

== See also ==
2013 Ohio Valley Conference men's basketball tournament
