= Jason James (basketball) =

American high school basketball coach (born 1977)

Biographical details
- Born: October 10, 1977 (age 49); St. Louis, Missouri, U.S.

Playing career
- 1996–2000: Graceland
- Position: Guard

Coaching career (HC unless noted)
- 2000–2002: STLCC–Forest Park (asst.)
- 2002–2009: UT Martin (asst.)
- 2009–2014: UT Martin
- 2014–2015: Blytheville HS
- 2015–present: Germantown HS

Jason T. James (born October 10, 1977) is an American high school basketball coach who is currently boys' varsity coach at Milan High School in Milan, TN. He was previously a college basketball coach, most recently men's basketball head coach at the University of Tennessee at Martin (UT Martin).

== Early life and education ==
Born in St. Louis, Missouri, James graduated from Parkway West High School in nearby Ballwin in 1996 and played basketball at Graceland College from 1996 to 2000. A guard, James was team captain as a senior.

== Coaching career ==
From 2000 to 2002, James was an assistant coach at St. Louis Community College–Forest Park.

James spent seven seasons as a UT Martin assistant under coach Bret Campbell. James took over for Campbell in 2009, but proceeded to post a 37–117 overall record in five seasons. In 2013–14, the Skyhawks went 8–23 and did not qualify for the conference tournament. James was fired on March 3, 2014.

After leaving UT Martin, James became head boys' varsity basketball coach at Blytheville High School in Blytheville, Arkansas before taking the same job at Germantown High School in Germantown, Tennessee. After Germantown, he served as head boys' varsity basketball coach at Kenwood High School in Clarksville, TN, before taking his current role at Milan High School in 2021.

== Head coaching record ==
Record table
Season	Team	Overall	Conference	Standing	Postseason
UT Martin Skyhawks (Ohio Valley Conference) (2009–2014)
2009–10	UT Martin	4–25	1–17	9th	
2010–11	UT Martin	12–21	6–12	7th	
2011–12	UT Martin	4–27	0–16	11th	
2012–13	UT Martin	9–21	5–11	5th (West)	
2013–14	UT Martin	8–23	3–13	5th (West)	
UT Martin:		37–117 (.240)	15–69 (.179)		
Total:		37–117 (.240)			
National champion Postseason invitational champion Conference regular season champion Conference regular season and conference tournament champion Division regular season champion Division regular season and conference tournament champion Conference tournament champion
