= 2012–13 Murray State Racers men's basketball team =

American college basketball season

2012–13 Murray State Racers men's basketball

Ohio Valley West Division Champions
- Conference: Ohio Valley Conference
- West Division
- Record: 21–10 (10–6 OVC)
- Head coach: Steve Prohm (2nd season)
- Assistant coaches: William Small; Matt McMahon; Tim MacAllister
- Home arena: CFSB Center

2012–13 Ohio Valley Conference men's basketball standings
	Conf.				Overall
Team	W		L	PCT	W		L	PCT
East
Belmont †	14	–	2	.875	26	–	7	.788
Eastern Kentucky	12	–	4	.750	25	–	10	.714
Tennessee State	11	–	5	.688	18	–	15	.545
Jacksonville State*	8	–	8	.500	17	–	11	.607
Morehead State	8	–	8	.500	15	–	18	.455
Tennessee Tech	5	–	11	.313	12	–	17	.414
West
Murray State	10	–	6	.625	21	–	10	.677
Southeast Missouri State	8	–	8	.500	17	–	16	.515
Eastern Illinois	6	–	10	.375	11	–	21	.344
SIU Edwardsville	5	–	11	.313	9	–	18	.333
UT Martin	5	–	11	.313	9	–	21	.300
Austin Peay	4	–	12	.250	8	–	23	.258
† 2013 OVC tournament winner As of March 23, 2013 * Ineligible for Postseason play due to APR Penalties; Rankings from AP Poll

The 2012–13 Murray State Racers men's basketball team represented Murray State University during the 2012–13 NCAA Division I men's basketball season. The Racers, led by second year head coach Steve Prohm, played their home games at the CFSB Center and were members of the West Division of the Ohio Valley Conference. They finished the season 21–10, 10–6 in OVC play to be champions of the West Division. They advanced to the championship game of the OVC tournament where they lost to Belmont in overtime. Despite the 21 wins, they did not participate in a post season tournament.

== Roster ==
2012–13 Murray State Racers men's basketball team
Players
Coaches

Pos.	#	Name	Height	Weight	Year	Previous school	Hometown
F	1	Stacy Wilson	6 ft 3 in (1.91 m)	185 lb (84 kg)	Sr	Mullins; Coffeyville CC	Mullins, SC
F	2	Ed Daniel	6 ft 7 in (2.01 m)	215 lb (98 kg)	Sr	Woodlawn	Birmingham, AL
G	3	Isaiah Canaan	6 ft 1 in (1.85 m)	195 lb (88 kg)	Sr	Biloxi	Biloxi, MS
G	5	Latreze Mushatt	6 ft 5 in (1.96 m)	210 lb (95 kg)	RS Sr	Arthur Hill; UMKC	Saginaw, MI
G	11	C. J. Ford	6 ft 1 in (1.85 m)	180 lb (82 kg)	Fr	Westover	Fayetteville, NC
F	12	Tyler Rambo	6 ft 5 in (1.96 m)	204 lb (93 kg)	Fr	Christian Life Academy (Humble, TX)	Grandview, MO
F	13	Brandon Garrett	6 ft 9 in (2.06 m)	200 lb (91 kg)	Sr	Paradise Valley; Indian Hills CC	Phoenix, AZ
F	14	Erik McCree	6 ft 7 in (2.01 m)	215 lb (98 kg)	Fr	West Orange	Winter Garden, FL
G	23	Dexter Fields	6 ft 2 in (1.88 m)	190 lb (86 kg)	RS Jr	Olympia; UAB	Orlando, FL
F	32	Jeffery Moss	6 ft 4 in (1.93 m)	180 lb (82 kg)	Fr	Bob Jones	Madison, AL
G	33	Jordan Burge	5 ft 11 in (1.8 m)	162 lb (73 kg)	Sr	Northside Baptist	Mayfield, KY
F	34	Terron Gilmore	6 ft 7 in (2.01 m)	200 lb (91 kg)	Fr	Callaway	Jackson, MS
F	35	Zay Henderson	6 ft 8 in (2.03 m)	235 lb (107 kg)	Fr	Neville	Monroe, LA

Head coach

- Steve Prohm (Alabama)

Assistant coach(es)

- William Small (Belhaven)
- Matt McMahon (Appalachian State)
- James Kane (Florida)

Legend

- (C) Team captain
- (S) Suspended
- (I) Ineligible
- (W) Walk-on
- Injured
- Current redshirt

Roster

Before the season, sophomore guard Zay Jackson was suspended for the 2012–13 season after pleading guilty to reduced charges stemming from a September 2012 incident in which he was accused of hitting two people with his car in a Walmart parking lot.

== Schedule ==
Date time, TV	Opponent	Result	Record	Site (attendance) city, state
Exhibition
11/05/2012*; 7:00 pm	Freed–Hardeman	W 87–74		CFSB Center (3,383); Murray, KY
Regular season
11/09/2012*; 7:30 pm	Brescia	W 88–43	1–0	CFSB Center (3,866); Murray, KY
11/15/2012*; 7:00 pm, ESPN3	vs. Auburn; Charleston Classic First Round	W 79–59	2–0	TD Arena (4,716); Charleston, SC
11/16/2012*; 4:30 pm, ESPN3	vs. St. John's; Charleston Classic Semifinals	W 72–67	3–0	TD Arena (4,780); Charleston, SC
11/18/2012*; 7:30 pm, ESPN2	vs. Colorado; Charleston Classic Final	L 74–81	3–1	TD Arena (3,291); Charleston, SC
11/24/2012*; 7:00 pm, ESPN3	Old Dominion	W 79–72	4–1	CFSB Center (4,745); Murray, KY
11/26/2012*; 6:30 pm, ESPN3	at Lipscomb	W 88–79	5–1	Allen Arena (2,985); Nashville, TN
12/04/2012*; 7:00 pm	Bethel	W 76–54	6–1	CFSB Center (3,542); Murray, KY
12/08/2012*; 1:05 pm, ESPN3	at Evansville	W 82–70	7–1	Ford Center (6,302); Evansville, IN
12/16/2012*; 2:00 pm, ESPN3	WKU	W 75–70	8–1	CFSB Center (7,080); Murray, KY
12/19/2012*; 7:35 pm, ESPN3	at Arkansas State	W 61–54	9–1	Convocation Center (2,834); Jonesboro, AR
12/22/2012*; 11:00 am, CBSSN	at Dayton	L 68–77	9–2	UD Arena (12,638); Dayton, OH
12/29/2012*; 2:00 pm, ESPN3	Valparaiso	L 64–66	9–3	CFSB Center (4,343); Murray, KY
01/03/2013; 7:00 pm, ESPN3	at Tennessee–Martin	W 73–62	10–3 (1–0)	Skyhawk Arena (3,557); Martin, TN
01/05/2013; 5:00 pm, ESPNU	at Southeast Missouri State	W 74–66	11–3 (2–0)	Show Me Center (4,915); Cape Girardeau, MO
01/09/2013; 7:00 pm	Eastern Kentucky	L 65–77	11–4 (2–1)	CFSB Center (4,052); Murray, KY
01/12/2013; 7:30 pm, ESPN3	at Austin Peay	W 71–68	12–4 (3–1)	Dunn Center (4,718); Clarksville, TN
01/17/2013; 7:00 pm	Eastern Illinois	W 70–49	13–4 (4–1)	CFSB Center (3,818); Murray, KY
01/19/2013; 7:30 pm, ESPN3	SIU Edwardsville	W 70–61	14–4 (5–1)	CFSB Center (5,102); Murray, KY
01/24/2013; 7:00 pm, ESPNU	at Tennessee Tech	W 47–39	15–4 (6–1)	Eblen Center (1,711); Cookeville, TN
01/26/2013; 4:30 pm, ESPN3	at Jacksonville State	L 64–65	15–5 (6–2)	Pete Mathews Coliseum (3,478); Jacksonville, AL
02/02/2013; 12:00 pm, ESPNU	Austin Peay	W 75–68 ^{OT}	16–5 (7–2)	CFSB Center (6,111); Murray, KY
02/07/2013; 7:00 pm, ESPNU	Belmont	W 79–74	17–5 (8–2)	CFSB Center (7,141); Murray, KY
02/09/2013; 7:00 pm	Tennessee State	W 69–48	18–5 (9–2)	CFSB Center (6,762); Murray, KY
02/14/2013; 7:00 pm, ESPN3	at SIU Edwardsville	L 60–65	18–6 (9–3)	Vadalabene Center (2,103); Edwardsville, IL
02/16/2013; 6:15 pm, ESPN3	at Eastern Illinois	L 70–79	18–7 (9–4)	Lantz Arena (2,455); Charleston, IL
02/20/2013; 6:00 pm, ESPN3	at Morehead State	W 106–100 ^{2OT}	19–7 (10–4)	Ellis Johnson Arena (3,317); Morehead, KY
02/23/2013*; 7:00 pm, ESPN2	South Dakota State; BracketBusters	W 73–62	20–7	CFSB Center (7,231); Murray, KY
02/28/2013; 7:00 pm	Tennessee–Martin	L 68–69	20–8 (10–5)	CFSB Center (4,823); Murray, KY
03/02/2013; 7:30 pm	Southeast Missouri State	L 68–84	20–9 (10–6)	CFSB Center (7,489); Murray, KY
2013 OVC Basketball tournament
03/08/2013; 8:00 pm, ESPN3	vs. Eastern Kentucky; Semifinals	W 81–73	21–9	Nashville Municipal Auditorium (3,977); Nashville, TN
03/09/2013; 6:00 pm, ESPN2	vs. Belmont; Championship Game	L 68–70 ^{OT}	21–10	Nashville Municipal Auditorium (4,590); Nashville, TN
*Non-conference game. ^{#}Rankings from AP Poll. (#) Tournament seedings in parentheses. All times are in Central Time.
