= 2013 Ohio Valley Conference men's basketball tournament =

- 2012 tournament logo
- Classification: Division I
- Season: 2012–13
- Teams: 8
- Site: Nashville Municipal Auditorium; Nashville, Tennessee
- Champions: Belmont (1st title)
- Winning coach: Rick Byrd (1st title)
- MVP: Kerron Johnson (Belmont)
- Attendance: 10,975
- Television: ESPNU, ESPN2, ESPN3

2012–13 Ohio Valley Conference men's basketball standings
	Conf.				Overall
Team	W		L	PCT	W		L	PCT
East
Belmont †	14	–	2	.875	26	–	7	.788
Eastern Kentucky	12	–	4	.750	25	–	10	.714
Tennessee State	11	–	5	.688	18	–	15	.545
Jacksonville State*	8	–	8	.500	17	–	11	.607
Morehead State	8	–	8	.500	15	–	18	.455
Tennessee Tech	5	–	11	.313	12	–	17	.414
West
Murray State	10	–	6	.625	21	–	10	.677
Southeast Missouri State	8	–	8	.500	17	–	16	.515
Eastern Illinois	6	–	10	.375	11	–	21	.344
SIU Edwardsville	5	–	11	.313	9	–	18	.333
UT Martin	5	–	11	.313	9	–	21	.300
Austin Peay	4	–	12	.250	8	–	23	.258
† 2013 OVC tournament winner As of March 23, 2013 * Ineligible for Postseason play due to APR Penalties; Rankings from AP Poll

The 2013 Ohio Valley Conference men's basketball tournament was held March 6–9 at Nashville Municipal Auditorium in Nashville, Tennessee. Belmont, the winner of the 2013 OVC Men's basketball tournament, received the conference's automatic bid to the 2013 NCAA tournament.

== Format ==
The tournament is an eight team tournament with the third and fourth seeds receiving a first round bye and the two divisional winners receiving byes through to the semifinals.

The top team in each division, based on conference winning percentage, automatically earns a berth into the OVC Tournament. The next six teams with the highest conference winning percentage also earn a bid, regardless of division. The 1st seed goes to the divisional winner with the higher conference winning percentage, while the No. 2 seed automatically goes to the other divisional winner. The remaining six teams are seeded 3-8 by conference winning percentage, regardless of division.

== Seeds ==
Seed	School	Conf (Overall)	Tiebreaker
#1	Belmont	14–2	OVC East Champion
#2	Murray State	10–6	OVC West Champion
#3	Eastern Kentucky	12–4	
#4	Tennessee State	11–5	
#5	Morehead State	8–8	1–0 vs SEMO
#6	SE Missouri State	8–8	0–1 vs Morehead
#7	Eastern Illinois	6–10	
#8	Tenn-Martin	5–11	2–1 vs Tenn Tech and SIUE

== Bracket ==
First round Wednesday, March 6
5	Morehead State	73
8	UT Martin	66
6	Southeast Missouri State	78
7	Eastern Illinois	68

Quarterfinals; Thursday, March 7
5	Morehead State	75
4	Tennessee State	88
6	Southeast Missouri State	69
3	Eastern Kentucky	84

Semifinals; Friday, March 8
4	Tennessee State	73
1	Belmont	82
3	Eastern Kentucky	73
2	Murray State	81

Championship Game; Saturday, March 9 ESPN2
1	Belmont	70
2	Murray State	68^{OT}

== See also ==
2013 Ohio Valley Conference women's basketball tournament
