= Travis Williams (basketball coach) =

American basketball player and coach (born 1972)

Travis L. Williams
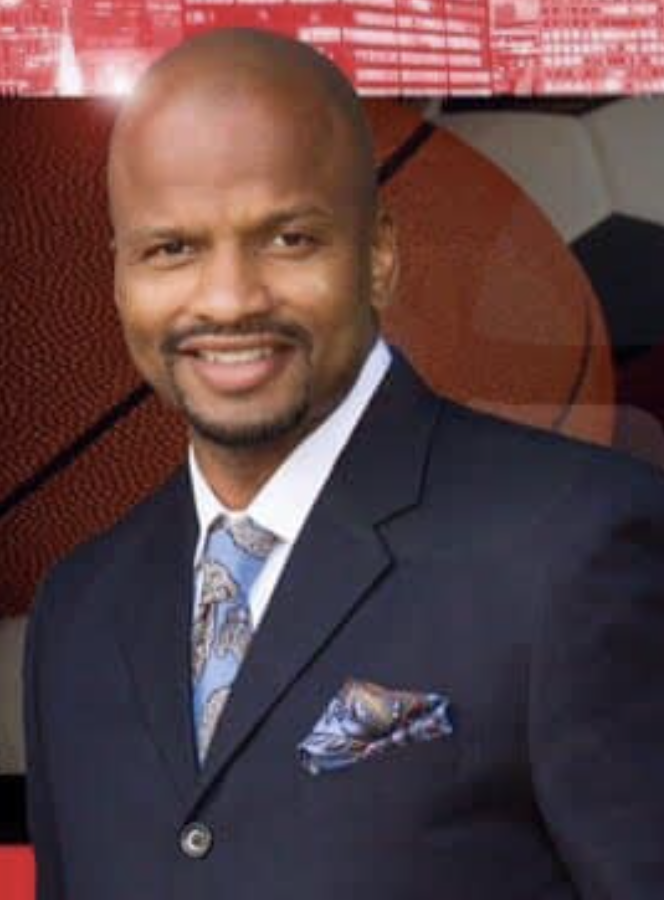

Current position
- Title: Founder & executive HBCU All-Stars LLC & CEO of Academics & Athletics Consulting & chairman of the Travis L. Williams Foundation

Biographical details
- Born: July 24, 1972 (age 54); Tifton, Georgia, U.S.

Playing career
- 1991–1996: Georgia State
- Position: Guard/Forward

Coaching career (HC unless noted)
- 1999–2003: Georgia State (asst.)
- 2003–2004: Chicago State (asst.)
- 2004: Southern Crescent Lightning (WBA) (asst.)
- 2004–2007: Fort Valley State
- 2007–2008: Mercer (asst.)
- 2008: Dongguan Snow Wolf (China NBL)
- 2009–2012: Tennessee State (asst.)
- 2012–2014: Tennessee State
- 2016–2018: Maynard H. Jackson High School

Travis L. Williams (born July 24, 1972) is a former NCAA Division I & II Head Men's Basketball coach at Tennessee State and Fort Valley State University, assistant coach at Georgia State, Mercer, & Chicago State University

== Head coaching record ==
Record table
Season	Team	Overall	Conference	Standing	Postseason
Fort Valley State Wildcats (Southern Intercollegiate Athletic Conference) (2004–2007)
2004–05	Fort Valley State	10–19	?	?	
2005–06	Fort Valley State	14–14	?	?	
2006–07	Fort Valley State	18–12	?	?	
Fort Valley State:		42–45			
Tennessee State Tigers (Ohio Valley Conference) (2011–present)
2012–13	Tennessee State	18–14	11–5	3rd East	CIT Lost 1st Round
2013–14	Tennessee State	5–25	4–12	t–5th East	
Tennessee State:		23–40	15–17		
Total:		65–85			
National champion Postseason invitational champion Conference regular season champion Conference regular season and conference tournament champion Division regular season champion Division regular season and conference tournament champion Conference tournament champion
