= 2012–13 Southeast Missouri State Redhawks men's basketball team =

American college basketball season

2012–13 Southeast Missouri State Redhawks men's basketball
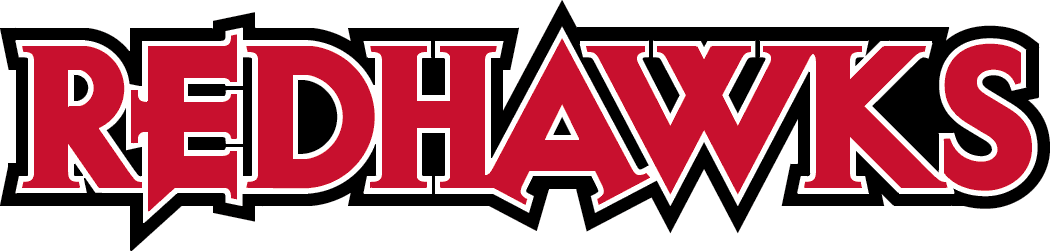
- Conference: Ohio Valley Conference
- West Division
- Record: 17–16 (8–8 OVC)
- Head coach: Dickey Nutt (4th season)
- Assistant coaches: Jessie Evans; Jamie Rosser; Jon Cremins
- Home arena: Show Me Center

2012–13 Ohio Valley Conference men's basketball standings
	Conf.				Overall
Team	W		L	PCT	W		L	PCT
East
Belmont †	14	–	2	.875	26	–	7	.788
Eastern Kentucky	12	–	4	.750	25	–	10	.714
Tennessee State	11	–	5	.688	18	–	15	.545
Jacksonville State*	8	–	8	.500	17	–	11	.607
Morehead State	8	–	8	.500	15	–	18	.455
Tennessee Tech	5	–	11	.313	12	–	17	.414
West
Murray State	10	–	6	.625	21	–	10	.677
Southeast Missouri State	8	–	8	.500	17	–	16	.515
Eastern Illinois	6	–	10	.375	11	–	21	.344
SIU Edwardsville	5	–	11	.313	9	–	18	.333
UT Martin	5	–	11	.313	9	–	21	.300
Austin Peay	4	–	12	.250	8	–	23	.258
† 2013 OVC tournament winner As of March 23, 2013 * Ineligible for Postseason play due to APR Penalties; Rankings from AP Poll

The 2012–13 Southeast Missouri State Redhawks men's basketball team represented Southeast Missouri State University during the 2012–13 NCAA Division I men's basketball season. The Redhawks, led by fourth year head coach Dickey Nutt, played their home games at the Show Me Center and were members of the West Division of the Ohio Valley Conference.

They finished the season 17–16, 8–8 in OVC play to finish in second place in the West Division. They lost in the quarterfinals of the OVC tournament to Eastern Kentucky.

== Roster ==
Number	Name	Position	Height	Weight	Year	Hometown
1	Nino Johnson	Forward	6–8	220	Sophomore	Memphis, Tennessee
2	A.J. Jones	Forward	6–4	200	Junior	Memphis, Tennessee
3	Nick Niemczyk	Guard	6–1	185	Senior	Bell City, Missouri
4	Corey Wilford	Guard	6–2	180	Senior	Hopkinsville, Kentucky
5	Wayne Martin, Jr.	Forward	6–7	205	Sophomore	Jacksonville, Florida
10	Matt Floyd	Guard	5–9	165	Freshman	St. Louis, Missouri
11	Michael Porter	Guard/Forward	6–6	235	Junior	Sikeston, Missouri
13	Lucas Nutt	Guard	6–1	180	Junior	Jonesboro, Arkansas
15	Jacob Tolbert	Forward	6–7	198	Freshman	Daisy, Missouri
23	Marland Smith	Guard	6–2	175	Senior	Little Rock, Arkansas
24	Jared White	Guard	6–2	200	Freshman	De Soto, Missouri
33	Tyler Stone	Forward	6–8	230	Junior	Memphis, Tennessee
41	Colin Ferguson	Forward/Center	6–9	250	Freshman	De Soto, Missouri
	Josh Langford	Guard	6–7	215	Junior	Huntsville, Alabama
	C.J. Reese	Guard	6–2	195	Freshman	Chattanooga, Tennessee

== Schedule ==
Date time, TV	Opponent	Result	Record	Site (attendance) city, state
Exhibition
10/30/2012*; 7:00 pm	Ouachita Baptist	W 71–60		Show Me Center (1,227); Cape Girardeau, MO
11/05/2012*; 7:00 pm	Truman State	W 80–75		Show Me Center (1,480); Cape Girardeau, MO
Regular season
11/09/2012*; 7:00 pm	at No. 7 Kansas; CBE Classic	L 55–74	0–1	Allen Fieldhouse (16,300); Lawrence, KS
11/12/2012*; 7:00 pm	Lyon	W 89–61	1–1	Show Me Center (1,909); Cape Girardeau, MO
11/15/2012*; 7:00 pm	McNeese State	W 64–53	2–1	Show Me Center (2,125); Cape Girardeau, MO
11/18/2012*; 2:00 pm	at Chattanooga; CBE Classic	W 77–65	3–1	McKenzie Arena (N/A); Chattanooga, TN
11/19/2012*; 4:00 pm	vs. Louisiana Tech; CBE Classic	L 63–67	3–2	McKenzie Arena (2,457); Chattanooga, TN
11/20/2012*; 4:00 pm	vs. Troy; CBE Classic	L 56–59	3–3	McKenzie Arena (2,395); Chattanooga, TN
11/24/2012*; 3:00 pm	at UIC	L 45–56	3–4	UIC Pavilion (2,542); Chicago, IL
11/26/2012*; 7:00 pm	Hannibal–LaGrange	W 96–55	4–4	Show Me Center (1,714); Cape Girardeau, MO
11/29/2012*; 6:00 pm	at New Orleans	W 83–67	5–4	Lakefront Arena (442); New Orleans, LA
12/01/2012*; 4:00 pm	at Southeastern Louisiana	W 61–58	6–4	University Center (843); Hammond, LA
12/04/2012*; 7:00 pm, ESPN3	at No. 12 Missouri	L 65–81	6–5	Mizzou Arena (7,905); Columbia, MO
12/08/2012*; 5:30 pm	at Central Arkansas	L 85–88	6–6	Show Me Center (2,384); Cape Girardeau, MO
12/19/2012*; 7:00 pm	New Orleans	W 94–71	7–6	Show Me Center (1,820); Cape Girardeau, MO
12/22/2012*; 12:05 pm	at UMKC	W 66–65	8–6	Swinney Recreation Center (886); Kansas City, MO
12/29/2012; 12:00 pm	Tennessee–Martin	W 65–60	9–6 (1–0)	Show Me Center (1,752); Cape Girardeau, MO
01/03/2013; 7:00 pm	Austin Peay	W 86–84	10–6 (2–0)	Show Me Center (1,845); Cape Girardeau, MO
01/05/2013; 5:00 pm, ESPNU	Murray State	L 66–74	10–7 (2–1)	Show Me Center (4,915); Cape Girardeau, MO
01/10/2013; 7:00 pm	at Belmont	L 72–107	10–8 (2–2)	Curb Event Center (1,923); Nashville, TN
01/12/2013; 7:00 pm	at Tennessee State	L 69–81	10–9 (2–3)	Gentry Complex (776); Nashville, TN
01/17/2013; 7:00 pm	Morehead State	L 59–75	10–10 (2–4)	Show Me Center (1,856); Cape Girardeau, MO
01/19/2013; 7:00 pm	at Tennessee Tech	W 74–62	11–10 (3–4)	Show Me Center (2,294); Cape Girardeau, MO
01/24/2013; 7:00 pm	at SIU Edwardsville	L 77–80	11–11 (3–5)	Vadalabene Center (1,989); Edwardsville, IL
01/26/2013; 6:00 pm	at Eastern Illinois	L 72–78 ^{OT}	11–12 (3–6)	Lantz Arena (1,288); Charleston, IL
02/02/2013; 5:30 pm	Eastern Kentucky	L 72–81	11–13 (3–7)	Show Me Center (2,922); Cape Girardeau, MO
02/07/2013; 7:00 pm	SIU Edwardsville	W 76–67	12–13 (4–7)	Show Me Center (2,212); Cape Girardeau, MO
02/09/2013; 5:30 pm	Eastern Illinois	W 77–64	13–13 (5–7)	Show Me Center (2,509); Cape Girardeau, MO
02/16/2013; 6:00 pm	at Tennessee–Martin	W 96–74	14–13 (6–7)	Skyhawk Arena (2,541); Martin, TN
02/20/2013; 7:00 pm	at Jacksonville State	L 65–67	14–14 (6–8)	Pete Mathews Coliseum (2,013); Jacksonville, AL
02/23/2013*; 5:30 pm	Ball State; BracketBusters	L 82–85	14–15	Show Me Center (2,484); Cape Girardeau, MO
02/28/2013; 7:00 pm	at Austin Peay	W 108–81	15–15 (7–8)	Dunn Center (1,920); Clarksville, TN
03/02/2013; 7:30 pm	at Murray State	W 84–68	16–15 (8–8)	CFSB Center (7,489); Murray, KY
2013 OVC Basketball tournament
03/06/2013; 8:30 pm	vs. Eastern Illinois; First Round	W 78–68	17–15	Nashville Municipal Auditorium (1,010); Nashville, TN
03/07/2013; 9:30 pm	vs. Eastern Kentucky; Quarterfinals	L 69–84	17–16	Nashville Municipal Auditorium (1,398); Nashville, TN
*Non-conference game. ^{#}Rankings from AP Poll. (#) Tournament seedings in parentheses. All times are in Central Time.
