= Alumni Coliseum =

Arena in Kentucky, US

- Baptist Health Arena
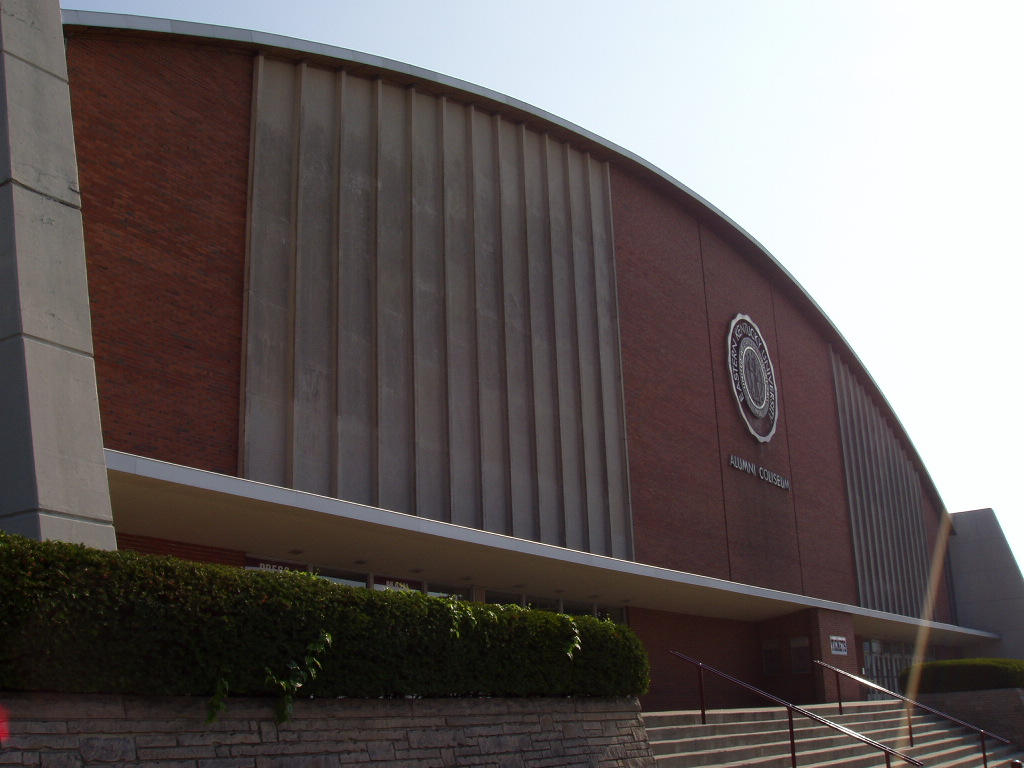
- Interactive map of Alumni Coliseum
- Location: Eastern Kentucky University; 521 Lancaster Avenue; Richmond, Kentucky 40475
- Coordinates: 37°44′14″N 84°18′5″W
- Owner: Eastern Kentucky University
- Operator: Eastern Kentucky University
- Capacity: 6,500
- Surface: Wood

Construction
- Groundbreaking: July 1, 1961
- Opened: September 23, 1963
- Cost: $3,244,623 (1963) ($34.1 million in 2025 dollars)
- Architects: Hartstern, Louis, and Henry

Tenant
- Eastern Kentucky Colonels (NCAA) (1963–present)

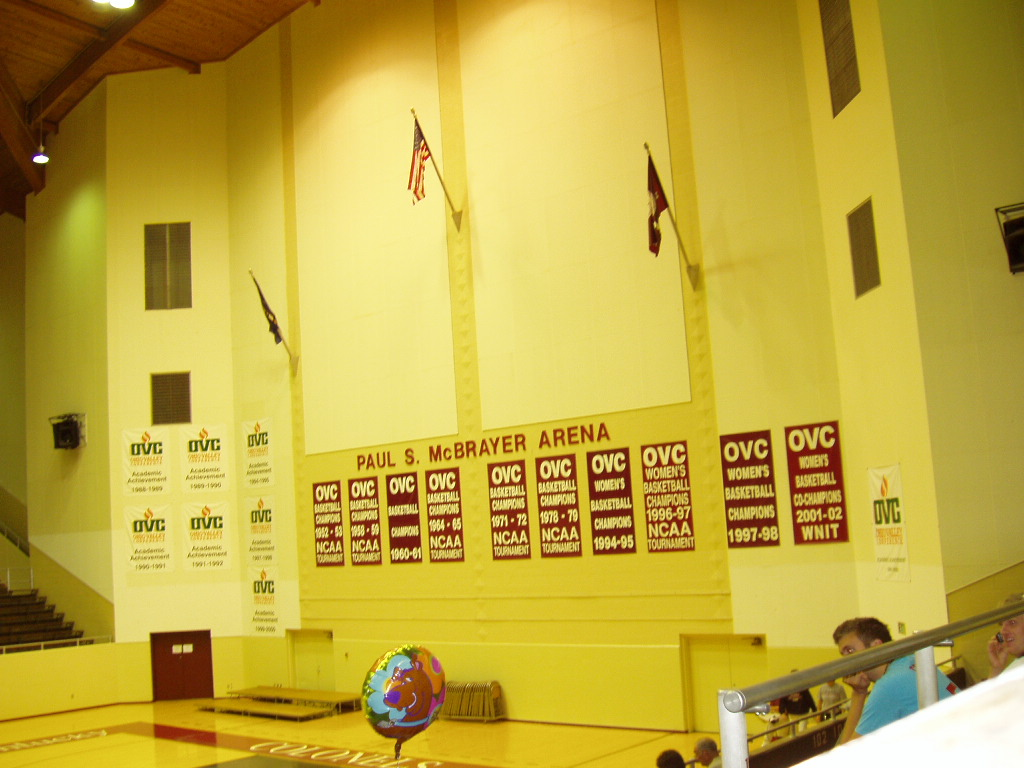
McBrayer Arena - Interior (2004)

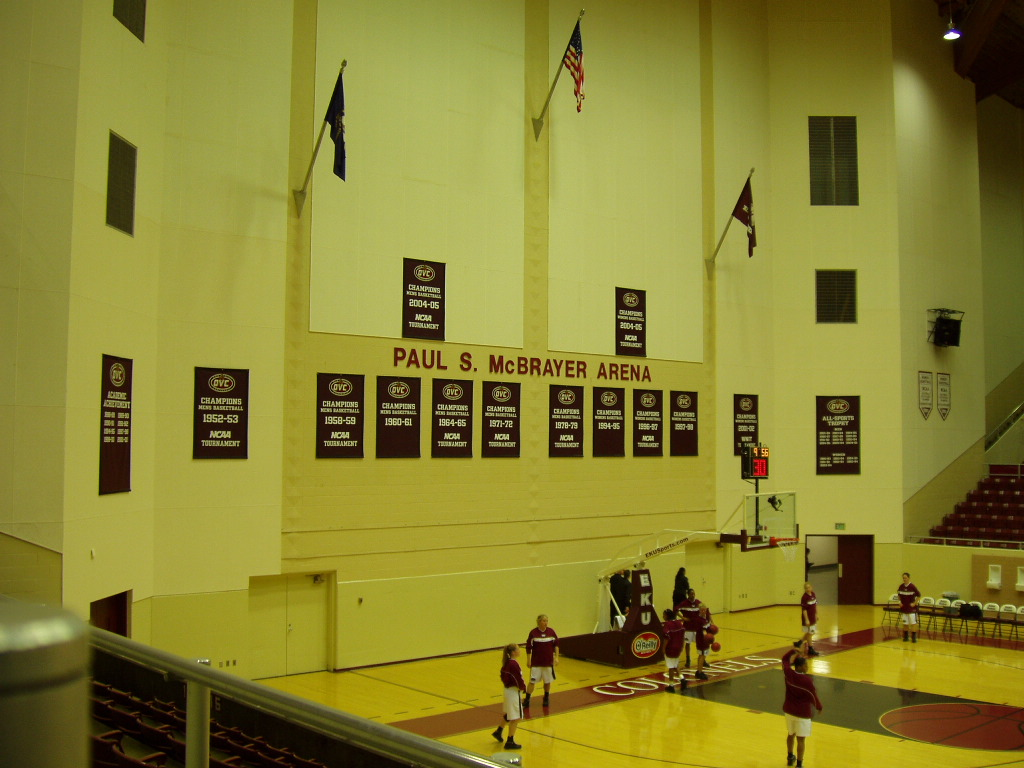
McBrayer Arena - Interior (2006)

Alumni Coliseum and Baptist Health Arena are home to the Eastern Kentucky University Colonels in Richmond, Kentucky.

== History ==
Alumni Coliseum houses the men's and women's basketball teams as well as the volleyball team. The groundbreaking occurred on June 1, 1961. The arena was not finished until 1963 and the project took 626,276 board feet of lumber. While being built the Coliseum collapsed due to a cable malfunction. The collapse caused two workers to be injured and equipment being left under the rubble.

The arena was originally named after Paul S. McBrayer. He was the head basketball coach from 1946 to 1962 and he had a record of 219–144. Trophy cases surrounding the concourse that hold trophies and memorabilia from former teams and players. The Coliseum seats 6,500 for basketball games and approximately 8,000 for concerts and other events.

Eastern Kentucky University officially joined the Atlantic Sun conference on July 1, 2021. The men's and women's basketball teams and volleyball immediately joined and played A-SUN teams.

The new partnership on Nov 2, 2022 between Eastern Kentucky University and Baptist Health is set for the next 11 years. The focus of the partnership is on healthcare education, workforce development, and community engagement. The $2.5 million investment is one of the largest in EKU's history.

The Donald Combs Natatorium, located behind the basketball arena, is the former home of the university's swimming and diving team and is now used for EKU recreation and the Model Laboratory School Swim team. The natatorium houses a 6 lane 25 yard swimming pool as well as one and three meter diving boards.The natatorium houses a 6 lane 25 yard swimming pool as well as one and three meter diving boards.

The Alumni Coliseum also houses four other basketball courts in an auxiliary gymnasium, an outdoor swimming pool, eight classrooms, the Chad Bratzke Student Academic Athletic Success Center, and 20 additional offices.

== Renovation ==
Renovation of Alumni Coliseum was announced on April 26, 2022. The Kentucky General Assembly approved $31 million for the renovation. The plans for the renovation project are upgrades to the facility's infrastructure, seating areas, lighting and amenities. The renovated Alumni Coliseum will serve as a multipurpose venue for concerts and other events in addition to athletic competitions. Renovation is set to be finished Fall of 2025 and as of March 8, 2024 significant progress has been made in the renovation efforts, including structural enhancements, modernized seating, and upgrades to concession and restrooms.

== Athletics ==
The Coliseum first was home to the men's basketball team for the 1963–64 season. The women's team was later founded in 1971, with the volleyball team beginning play inside the arena in 1991. All teams currently still reside in the Coliseum.

In the 2023–2024 season the men's basketball team finished 17–14, 12–4 in conference play, with the women's team finishing 22–12, and 9–7 in conference play. The volleyball team had a record of 21–9.

In addition to university sponsored athletics Alumni Coliseum has also played host to a variety of other sporting events, including the All "A" Classic High School basketball tournament, KHSAA Region 5 Swimming and Diving Championships, and continues to host the Special Olympics Kentucky Summer Games.

It hosted the Ohio Valley Conference men's basketball tournament in 1979.

== Concerts and events ==
The arena has also hosted numerous musical performers over the years, more recently including 3 Doors Down, O.A.R. (Of A Revolution), Diamond Rio, They Might be Giants, Nappy Roots and The Black Eyed Peas.

== Concessions ==
Concessions offer chicken sandwiches, tacos, burgers, hot dogs, brats, and pizza. Snack options include popcorn, chips, candy, nachos, soft pretzels, peanuts, cookies, and Dippin' Dots.

== Surrounding amenities ==
Multiple hotels located near the Coliseum provide sleeping accommodations for travelers. Several restaurants operate near the arena, including Logan's, Hooters, and one local spot, Madison Garden, which offers over 175 different beers.

== See also ==
- List of NCAA Division I basketball arenas
