= Jackson Township, Greene County, Indiana =

Jackson Township
- Township
- Location in Greene County
- Coordinates: 38°57′02″N 86°45′21″W
- Country: United States
- State: Indiana
- County: Greene

Government
  - Type: Indiana township

Area
  - Total: 49.04 sq mi (127.0 km^{2})
  - Land: 48.99 sq mi (126.9 km^{2})
  - Water: 0.05 sq mi (0.13 km^{2}) 0.10%
- Elevation: 692 ft (211 m)

Population (2020)
  - Total: 1,809
  - Density: 36.93/sq mi (14.26/km^{2})
- GNIS feature ID: 0453445

Jackson Township is one of fifteen townships in Greene County, Indiana, USA. As of the 2020 census, its population was 1,809, down from 1,947 at 2010.

Historical population
Census	Pop.	Note	%±
1890	2,185		—
1900	1,908		−12.7%
1910	1,440		−24.5%
1920	1,286		−10.7%
1930	1,091		−15.2%
1940	1,225		12.3%
1950	1,069		−12.7%
1960	1,059		−0.9%
1970	1,182		11.6%
1980	1,328		12.4%
1990	1,499		12.9%
2000	2,076		38.5%
2010	1,947		−6.2%
2020	1,809		−7.1%
Source: US Decennial Census

== Geography ==
According to the 2010 census, the township has a total area of 49.04 square miles (127.0 km^{2}), of which 48.99 square miles (126.9 km^{2}) (or 99.90%) is land and 0.05 square miles (0.13 km^{2}) (or 0.10%) is water. The streams of Cole Branch, Dry Branch, Little Indian Creek, Miller Creek, Mitchell Branch and Town Branch run through this township.

=== Unincorporated towns ===
- Koleen
- Owensburg

(This list is based on USGS data and may include former settlements.)

=== Adjacent townships ===
- Center Township (north)
- Indian Creek Township, Monroe County (northeast)
- Perry Township, Lawrence County (east)
- Indian Creek Township, Lawrence County (southeast)
- Mitcheltree Township, Martin County (south)
- Perry Township, Martin County (southwest)
- Taylor Township (west)
- Richland Township (northwest)

=== Cemeteries ===
The township contains eleven cemeteries: Cooper, Dishman, Duke, Freeman, Holder, Howell, Miller, Robison, Rush, Wagoner and Walker.

=== Major highways ===
- SR 45
- SR 54
- SR 58
