= Stump Edington =

American baseball player (1891–1969)

- Outfielder
- Born: July 4, 1891; Koleen, Indiana, U.S.
- Died: November 11, 1969 (aged 78); Bastrop, Louisiana, U.S.
- Batted: Left Threw: Left

MLB debut
- June 20, 1912, for the Pittsburgh Pirates

Last MLB appearance
- July 13, 1912, for the Pittsburgh Pirates

MLB statistics
- Batting average: .302
- Home runs: 0
- Runs batted in: 12
- Stats at Baseball Reference

Teams
- Pittsburgh Pirates (1912)

Jacob Franklin "Stump" Edington (July 4, 1891 – November 11, 1969) was an American Major League Baseball (MLB) right fielder who played for the Pittsburgh Pirates for about a month in 1912 (June 20-July 13). The 20-year-old rookie, who stood 5 ft 8 in (1.73 m) and weighed 170 lbs., was a native of Koleen, Indiana.

Edington played well during his time with the Pirates. In 15 games he hit .302 (16-for-53) with 2 triples, 12 runs batted in, and 4 runs scored. In the field he handled 25 chances flawlessly for a fielding percentage of 1.000. He was one of seven different players to appear in right field for the team that season.

Three of his famous teammates on the Pirates were future Hall of Famers Honus Wagner, Max Carey, and Bill McKechnie.

After his brief career with the Pirates, he returned to play in the Central League from 1915 to 1917, the Pacific Coast League from 1919 to 1921 and the Texas League from 1922 to 1928. He was a player/manager with the Beaumont Exporters of the Texas League in 1923 and after his playing career ended, he managed a couple of teams in 1928.

Edington died at the age of 78 in Bastrop, Louisiana.
