= Oscar Riddle =

American biologist

- Born: September 27, 1877; Cincinnati, Indiana
- Died: November 29, 1968 (aged 91); Plant City, Florida

Academic background
- Education: Indiana University (B.S., 1902); University of Chicago (PhD, 1907)

Oscar Riddle (September 27, 1877 – November 29, 1968) was an American biologist. He is known for his research into the pituitary gland and for isolating the hormone prolactin.

== Early career ==
Riddle was born and raised on a farm in Cincinnati, Indiana, where he was one of eight siblings. He received a Bachelor of Science in biology from Indiana University Bloomington in 1902 and a Doctorate in zoology at the University of Chicago in 1907. He taught physiology and biology in Saint Louis, Missouri and Puerto Rico, and he embarked on natural history expeditions to the Orinoco River in South America and Cuba. In 1912 he was appointed a research associate at the Carnegie Institution's Cold Spring Harbor Laboratory in Long Island. He stayed with the Cold Spring Harbor institution for the rest of his career, until his retirement in 1945.

Riddle was elected to the American Philosophical Society in 1926, the American Academy of Arts and Sciences in 1934, and the United States National Academy of Sciences in 1939.

== Research ==
Oscar Riddle published many dozens of original research reports in the 30 years 1916–1945. His research spanned endocrinology, the physiology of reproduction, animal pigmentation, and the nature and functional basis of sex. He is most remembered for his research into the major pituitary hormone prolactin. It was shown by other researchers in 1928 that an aqueous mash of pituitary cells can induce lactation in female mammals. Riddle and his colleagues were the first to isolate prolactin, which was named by Riddle in 1932. Also around 1932 Riddle was earliest to show that the prolactin protein induces the secretion of crop milk in pigeons and other birds. During the 1930s he participated in leading-edge demonstrations on the effects of prolactin injections in animals.

== Humanism ==
Riddle was a devout atheist and held the conviction that religion poses a serious threat to scientific advancements. He garnered national attention for a speech debunking superstition in 1936. His speech was delivered to the American Association for the Advancement of Science and was published in the journal Science and covered by The New York Times. Riddle was featured on the cover of Time (magazine) in January 1939. In 1958, Riddle was named the Humanist of the Year by the American Humanist Association. He was president of the American Rationalist Federation in 1959 and 1960.

In 1937, Riddle married Leona Lewis, a music teacher. They had no children.

He died of prostate cancer at the age of 91 in Plant City, Florida, in 1968.

== Books ==
- Endocrines and Constitution in Doves and Pigeons (1947)
- The Unleashing of Evolutionary Thought (1952)
