= 2012–13 Wright State Raiders men's basketball team =

American college basketball season

2012–13 Wright State Raiders men's basketball

CBI, Semifinals
- Conference: Horizon League
- Record: 23–13 (10–6 Horizon)
- Head coach: Billy Donlon (3rd season)
- Assistant coaches: Chris Moore; Scott Woods; Brandon Mullins
- Home arena: Nutter Center

2012–13 Horizon League men's basketball standings
	Conf.				Overall
Team	W		L	PCT	W		L	PCT
Valparaiso †	13	–	3	.813	26	–	8	.765
Detroit	12	–	4	.750	20	–	13	.606
Wright State	10	–	6	.625	23	–	13	.639
Green Bay	10	–	6	.625	18	–	16	.529
UIC	7	–	9	.438	18	–	16	.529
Youngstown State	7	–	9	.438	18	–	16	.529
Loyola Chicago	5	–	11	.313	15	–	16	.484
Cleveland State	5	–	11	.313	14	–	18	.438
Milwaukee	3	–	13	.188	8	–	24	.250
† 2013 Horizon League Tournament winner As of March 27, 2013; Rankings from AP Poll

The 2012–13 Wright State Raiders men's basketball team represented Wright State University during the 2012–13 NCAA Division I men's basketball season. The Raiders, led by third year head coach Billy Donlon, played their home games at the Nutter Center and were members of the Horizon League. They finished the season 23–13, 10–6 in Horizon League play to finish in a tie for third place. They advanced to the championship game of the Horizon League tournament where they lost to Valparaiso. They were invited to the 2013 College Basketball Invitational where they defeated Tulsa and Richmond to advance to the semifinals where they lost to Santa Clara.

== Roster ==
Number	Name	Position	Height	Weight	Year	Hometown
0	Bobo Drummond	Guard	5–11	175	Freshman	Peoria, Illinois
2	Daniel Collie	Guard	5–11	175	Freshman	Parkersburg, West Virginia
3	Reggie Arceneaux	Guard	5–9	160	Sophomore	New Orleans, Louisiana
4	Jerran Young	Forward	6–6	190	Junior	Cedar Hill, Texas
5	Miles Dixon	Guard	6–1	180	Junior	Missouri City, Texas
11	JT Yoho	Forward	6–6	220	Freshman	Solsberry, Indiana
15	Kendall Griffin	Guard	6–4	210	Sophomore	Avon, Indiana
20	Steven Davis	Forward	6–7	190	Freshman	Indianapolis, Indiana
22	Cole Darling	Forward	6–8	200	Junior	Holt, Michigan
23	AJ Pacher	Forward	6–10	245	Junior	Vandalia, Ohio
24	Matt Vest	Guard	6–5	200	Junior	Kettering, Ohio
30	Joe Bramanti	Guard	6–2	195	Freshman	Andover, Massachusetts
34	Stephen Gossard	Forward	6–6	205	Sophomore	Waynesville, Ohio
44	Tavares Sledge	Forward	6–9	225	Sophomore	Mobile, Alabama
45	Jacoby Roddy	Forward	6–5	210	Freshman	Peoria, Illinois

== Schedule ==
Date time, TV	Opponent	Result	Record	Site (attendance) city, state
Regular season
11/02/2012*; 7:00 pm	Central State	W 78–56		Nutter Center (2,985); Fairborn, OH
Regular season
11/09/2012*; 10:00 pm	at Idaho	W 80–70	1–0	Memorial Gymnasium (1,303); Moscow, ID
11/13/2012*; 8:00 pm	at Eastern Illinois	W 56–44	2–0	Lantz Arena (806); Charleston, IL
11/16/2012*; 7:00 pm	North Carolina A&T	W 56–44	3–0	Nutter Center (3,726); Fairborn, OH
11/21/2012*; 7:00 pm	vs. Central Michigan; Utah Thanksgiving Tournament	L 55–59	3–1	Jon M. Huntsman Center (7,898); Salt Lake City, UT
11/23/2012*; 9:00 am	vs. Idaho State; Utah Thanksgiving Tournament	W 60–45	4–1	Jon M. Huntsman Center (7,599); Salt Lake City, UT
11/24/2012*; 9:30 pm, Pac-12 Network	at Utah; Utah Thanksgiving Tournament	L 54–66	4–2	Jon M. Huntsman Center (7,649); Salt Lake City, UT
12/01/2012*; 2:00 pm	Morehead State	W 66–57	5–2	Nutter Center (2,807); Fairborn, OH
12/03/2012*; 7:00 pm	at Bowling Green	L 41–54	5–3	Stroh Center (1,351); Bowling Green, OH
12/08/2012*; 7:00 pm	VMI	W 92–59	6–3	Nutter Center (3,500); Fairborn, OH
12/15/2012*; 2:00 pm	at Hofstra	W 63–57	7–3	Mack Sports Complex (1,768); Hempstead, NY
12/19/2012*; 8:00 pm	Miami (OH)	W 67–59	8–3	Nutter Center (3,470); Fairborn, OH
12/22/2012*; 4:00 pm, FS Ohio	at No. 11 Cincinnati	L 58–68	8–4	Fifth Third Arena (9,248); Cincinnati, OH
12/30/2012*; 2:00 pm	Mount St. Joseph	W 58–49	9–4	Nutter Center (3,344); Fairborn, OH
01/03/2013; 7:00 pm	Green Bay	W 64–53	10–4 (1–0)	Nutter Center (3,312); Fairborn, OH
01/05/2013; 7:00 pm	Milwaukee	W 53–51	11–4 (2–0)	Nutter Center (3,921); Fairborn, OH
01/09/2013; 7:00 pm	Cleveland State	W 69–53	12–4 (3–0)	Nutter Center (4,048); Fairborn, OH
01/11/2013; 9:00 pm, ESPNU	at Loyola–Chicago	W 62–61	13–4 (4–0)	Joseph J. Gentile Arena (2,258); Chicago, IL
01/19/2013; 8:00 pm	at Valparaiso	L 63–69	13–5 (4–1)	Athletics–Recreation Center (4,860); Valparaiso, IN
01/21/2013; 7:00 pm	at Detroit	W 64–62	14–5 (5–1)	Calihan Hall (2,115); Detroit, MI
01/23/2013; 7:05 pm	at Youngstown State	L 61–68	14–6 (5–2)	Beeghly Center (2,288); Youngstown, OH
01/26/2013; 7:00 pm	UIC	L 49–55	14–7 (5–3)	Nutter Center (8,065); Fairborn, OH
01/30/2013; 7:00 pm	Detroit	L 76–83	14–8 (5–4)	Nutter Center (4,151); Fairborn, OH
02/04/2013; 7:00 pm	Loyola–Chicago	W 62–59	15–8 (6–4)	Nutter Center (3,171); Fairborn, OH
02/07/2013; 8:00 pm	at Green Bay	W 70–68 ^{2OT}	16–8 (7–4)	Resch Center (2,522); Green Bay, WI
02/09/2013; 8:00 pm	at Milwaukee	W 64–49	17–8 (8–4)	Klotsche Center (2,051); Milwaukee, WI
02/12/2013; 7:00 pm	Valparaiso	L 61–68	17–9 (8–5)	Nutter Center (4,301); Fairborn, OH
02/20/2013; 7:00 pm	at Cleveland State	W 50–41	18–9 (9–5)	Wolstein Center (2,115); Cleveland, OH
02/23/2013*; 2:00 pm	Evansville; BracketBusters	L 58–70	18–10	Nutter Center (3,428); Fairborn, OH
02/26/2013; 8:00 pm	at UIC	L 55–60	18–11 (9–6)	UIC Pavilion (2,951); Chicago, IL
03/02/2013; 2:00 pm, HLN/ESPN3	Youngstown State	W 72–45	19–11 (10–6)	Nutter Center (3,682); Fairborn, OH
2013 Horizon League tournament
03/08/2013; 6:00 pm, ESPN3	vs. Youngstown State; Quarterfinals	W 66–59	20–11	Athletics–Recreation Center (1,155); Valparaiso, IN
03/09/2013; 6:00 pm, ESPN3	vs. Detroit; Semifinals	W 56–54	21–11	Athletics–Recreation Center; Valparaiso, IN
03/12/2013; 9:00 pm, ESPN	at Valparaiso; Championship Game	L 54–62	21–12	Athletics–Recreation Center (4,457); Valparaiso, IN
2013 College Basketball Invitational
03/20/2013*; 7:00 pm	Tulsa; First Round	W 72–52	22–12	Nutter Center (2,507); Fairborn, OH
03/25/2013*; 7:00 pm	Richmond; Quarterfinals	W 57–51	23–12	Nutter Center (3,741); Fairborn, OH
03/27/2013*; 9:00 pm, AXS TV	Santa Clara; Semifinals	L 69–81	23–13	Nutter Center (3,188); Fairborn, OH
*Non-conference game. ^{#}Rankings from AP Poll. (#) Tournament seedings in parentheses. All times are in Eastern Time.

== Awards and honors ==
Cole Darling	MVP
Matt Vest	Raider Award
Cole Darling	Second Team All Horizon League
Billy Donlon	Horizon League Coach of the Year

== Statistics ==
Number	Name	Games	Average	Points	Assists	Rebounds
4	Jerran Young	36	8.8	316	30	146
5	Miles Dixon	36	8.5	305	45	54
3	Reggie Arceneaux	34	8.9	303	86	78
22	Cole Darling	22	11.3	249	13	101
11	JT Yoho	36	6.5	234	20	86
15	Kendall Griffin	36	6.3	227	73	84
24	Matt Vest	36	5.5	199	80	134
23	AJ Pacher	33	5.4	199	80	134
44	Tavares Sledge	34	4.1	141	12	140
30	Joe Bramanti	35	1.6	57	39	58
45	Jacoby Roddy	8	1.3	10	1	7
34	Stephen Gossard	5	1.4	7	0	3
00	Bobo Drummond	14	0.4	5	5	6
02	Daniel Collie	6	0.3	2	0	2
