= Center Township, Greene County, Indiana =

Center Township
- Township
- Location in Greene County
- Coordinates: 39°02′05″N 86°45′14″W
- Country: United States
- State: Indiana
- County: Greene

Government
  - Type: Indiana township

Area
  - Total: 48.2 sq mi (125 km^{2})
  - Land: 48.2 sq mi (125 km^{2})
  - Water: 0.01 sq mi (0.026 km^{2}) 0.02%
- Elevation: 676 ft (206 m)

Population (2020)
  - Total: 3,180
  - Density: 66.0/sq mi (25.5/km^{2})
- GNIS feature ID: 0453179

Center Township is one of fifteen townships in Greene County, Indiana, USA. As of the 2020 census, its population was 3,180, down from 3,535 at 2010.

Historical population
Census	Pop.	Note	%±
1890	1,758		—
1900	1,548		−11.9%
1910	1,163		−24.9%
1920	1,031		−11.3%
1930	960		−6.9%
1940	1,049		9.3%
1950	1,126		7.3%
1960	1,137		1.0%
1970	1,391		22.3%
1980	1,912		37.5%
1990	2,439		27.6%
2000	3,109		27.5%
2010	3,535		13.7%
2020	3,180		−10.0%
Source: US Decennial Census

== Geography ==
According to the 2010 census, the township has a total area of 48.2 square miles (125 km^{2}), of which 48.2 square miles (125 km^{2}) (or 100%) is land and 0.01 square miles (0.026 km^{2}) (or 0.02%) is water. The streams of Anderson Branch, Bridge Creek, Indian Creek and Little Clifty Branch run through this township.

=== Unincorporated communities ===
- Cincinnati
- Hobbieville
- Ridgeport

(This list is based on USGS data and may include former settlements.)

=== Adjacent townships ===
- Beech Creek Township (north)
- Van Buren Township, Monroe County (northeast)
- Indian Creek Township, Monroe County (east)
- Perry Township, Lawrence County (southeast)
- Jackson Township (south)
- Taylor Township (southwest)
- Richland Township (west)

=== Cemeteries ===
The township contains eight cemeteries: Beech, Bingham, Burch, Carmichael, Flynn, Lawrence, Sparks and Stone.

=== Major highways ===
- SR 43
- SR 45
- SR 54
- SR 445
