= 2013 Horizon League men's basketball tournament =

- Tournament logo
- Classification: Division I
- Season: 2012–13
- Teams: 9
- First round site: Campus sites
- Semifinals site: Athletics-Recreation Center; Valparaiso, IN
- Finals site: Athletics-Recreation Center; Valparaiso, IN
- Champions: Valparaiso (1st title)
- Winning coach: Bryce Drew (1st title)
- MVP: Erik Buggs (Valparaiso)

2012–13 Horizon League men's basketball standings
	Conf.				Overall
Team	W		L	PCT	W		L	PCT
Valparaiso †	13	–	3	.813	26	–	8	.765
Detroit	12	–	4	.750	20	–	13	.606
Wright State	10	–	6	.625	23	–	13	.639
Green Bay	10	–	6	.625	18	–	16	.529
UIC	7	–	9	.438	18	–	16	.529
Youngstown State	7	–	9	.438	18	–	16	.529
Loyola Chicago	5	–	11	.313	15	–	16	.484
Cleveland State	5	–	11	.313	14	–	18	.438
Milwaukee	3	–	13	.188	8	–	24	.250
† 2013 Horizon League Tournament winner As of March 27, 2013; Rankings from AP Poll

The 2013 Horizon League men's basketball tournament began on March 5, 2013, and ended with the championship game on Tuesday, March 12.

First round games were played on the home court of the higher-seeded team. The second round and semifinals were hosted by the No. 1 seed Valparaiso, while the highest remaining seed hosted the championship game. All Horizon League schools participated in the tournament. Teams were seeded by their regular season record, with a tiebreaker system to seed teams with identical conference records. The top two teams received a bye to the semifinals. With the departure of Butler to the Atlantic 10, there were only three first-round games.

== Seeds ==
Seed	Team	Record	Tie-breaker
1	Valparaiso	13–3	N/A
2	Detroit	12–4	N/A
3	Wright State	10–6	2–0 head-to-head vs. Green Bay
4	Green Bay	10–6	0–2 head-to-head vs. WSU
5	UIC	7–9	2–0 head-to-head vs. YSU
6	Youngstown State	7–9	0–2 head-to-head vs. UIC
7	Loyola–Chicago	5–11	2–0 head-to-head vs. CSU
8	Cleveland State	5–11	0–2 head-to-head vs. Loyola–Chicago
9	Milwaukee	3–13	N/A

== Schedule ==
Game	Time*	Matchup^{#}	Television
First Round – Tuesday, March 5
1	8:00 PM	#9 Milwaukee at #4 Green Bay	
2	8:00 PM	#8 Cleveland State at #5 UIC	
3	7:15 PM	#7 Loyola–Chicago at #6 Youngstown St	
Second Round – Friday, March 8
4	6:00 PM	#3 Wright State vs. #6 Youngstown St	
5	8:30 PM	#4 Green Bay vs. #5 UIC	
Semifinals – Saturday, March 9
6	6:00 PM	#3 Wright State vs. #2 Detroit	ESPNU (TV delayed to 10:30 PM)
7	8:30 PM	#4 Green Bay at #1 Valparaiso	ESPNU
Championship Game – Tuesday, March 12
8	9:00 PM	#3 Wright State vs. #1 Valparaiso	ESPN
*Game Times in ET. #-Rankings denote tournament seeding.

== Bracket ==
First round Tuesday, March 5
4	Green Bay	62
9	Milwaukee	46
5	UIC	82
8	Cleveland State	59
6	Youngstown State	62
7	Loyola Chicago	60

Quarterfinals; Friday, March 8
4	Green Bay	64
5	UIC	63
6	Youngstown State	59
3	Wright State	66

Semifinals; Saturday, March 9
1	Valparaiso	70
4	Green Bay	69
2	Detroit	54
3	Wright State	56

Championship Game; Tuesday, March 12
1	Valparaiso	62
3	Wright State	54

First round games at campus sites of lower-numbered seeds
Second round and semifinals hosted by #1 Seed Valparaiso
Championship game hosted by highest remaining seed

== Honors ==
=== Tournament MVP ===
Erik Buggs of Valparaiso was named the tournament MVP.

=== Horizon League All-Tournament Team ===
Player	School	Position	Year
Erik Buggs	Valparaiso	Guard	Senior
Ryan Broekhoff	Valparaiso	Forward	Senior
Reggie Arceneaux	Wright State		Sophomore
Miles Dixon	Wright State		Junior
Keifer Sykes	Green Bay		Sophomore
