= 2012–13 Valparaiso Crusaders men's basketball team =

American college basketball season

2012–13 Valparaiso Crusaders men's basketball

Horizon League Regular Season Champions Horizon League tournament champions

NCAA Tournament, round of 64
- Conference: Horizon League
- Record: 26–8 (13–3 Horizon)
- Head coach: Bryce Drew
- Assistant coaches: Roger Powell; Luke Gore; Jake Diebler
- Home arena: Athletics–Recreation Center

2012–13 Horizon League men's basketball standings
	Conf.				Overall
Team	W		L	PCT	W		L	PCT
Valparaiso †	13	–	3	.813	26	–	8	.765
Detroit	12	–	4	.750	20	–	13	.606
Wright State	10	–	6	.625	23	–	13	.639
Green Bay	10	–	6	.625	18	–	16	.529
UIC	7	–	9	.438	18	–	16	.529
Youngstown State	7	–	9	.438	18	–	16	.529
Loyola Chicago	5	–	11	.313	15	–	16	.484
Cleveland State	5	–	11	.313	14	–	18	.438
Milwaukee	3	–	13	.188	8	–	24	.250
† 2013 Horizon League Tournament winner As of March 27, 2013; Rankings from AP Poll

The 2012–13 Valparaiso Crusaders men's basketball team represented Valparaiso University during the 2012–13 NCAA Division I men's basketball season. The Cruasaders, led by second year head coach Bryce Drew, played their home games at the Athletics–Recreation Center and were members of the Horizon League. The season finished with 26–8 in overall, 13–3 in Horizon League to become Horizon League Regular Season Champions. They were also champions of the Horizon League tournament, defeating Wright State in the championship game, for the first Horizon League title in school history. They received an automatic bid to the 2013 NCAA tournament, their first tournament bid in 9 years, where they received a 14 seed and lost to 3 seed Michigan State in the second round.

== Roster ==
2012–13 Valparaiso Crusaders men's basketball team
Players
Coaches

Pos.	#	Name	Height	Weight	Year	Hometown
G	2	Jordan Coleman	6 ft 4 in (1.93 m)	175 lb (79 kg)	Jr	North Hollywood, CA
G	3	Will Bogan	6 ft 1 in (1.85 m)	170 lb (77 kg)	RS Sr	Boise, ID
G	4	LaVonte Dority	6 ft 1 in (1.85 m)	195 lb (88 kg)	Jr	Chicago, IL
F	5	Bobby Capobianco	6 ft 9 in (2.06 m)	250 lb (113 kg)	RS Jr	Loveland, OH
G	10	Alex Rossi	6 ft 6 in (1.98 m)	200 lb (91 kg)	RS So	Winnetka, IL
G	12	Ben Boggs	6 ft 4 in (1.93 m)	195 lb (88 kg)	Sr	Roanoke, VA
F	14	Vashil Fernandez	6 ft 10 in (2.08 m)	220 lb (100 kg)	So	Kingston, JM
G	15	Erik Buggs	5 ft 11 in (1.8 m)	155 lb (70 kg)	RS Sr	Memphis, TN
G	23	Matt Kenney	6 ft 4 in (1.93 m)	205 lb (93 kg)	Sr	Mooresville, IN
F	32	David Chadwick (redshirt)	6 ft 9 in (2.06 m)	220 lb (100 kg)	Jr	Charlotte, NC
F	45	Ryan Broekhoff	6 ft 7 in (2.01 m)	215 lb (98 kg)	Sr	Frankston, VIC, AU
F	55	Kevin van Wijk	6 ft 8 in (2.03 m)	230 lb (104 kg)	Sr	Hoofddorp, NL

Head coach

- Bryce Drew (Valparaiso)

Assistant coach(es)

- Roger Powell, Jr. (Illinois)
- Luke Gore (Bethel (TN))
- Jake Diebler (Valparaiso)

Legend

- (C) Team captain
- (S) Suspended
- (I) Ineligible
- (W) Walk-on
- Injured
- Current redshirt

Roster
Last update: 2012-08-26

== Schedule ==
Date time, TV	Rank^{#}	Opponent^{#}	Result	Record	Site (attendance) city, state
Exhibition
Oct. 27*; 7:05 pm		Saint Joseph's (IN)	W 90–62	–	Athletics–Recreation Center (3,198); Valparaiso, IN
Nov. 3*; 7:05 pm		Robert Morris (IL)	W 92–64	–	Athletics–Recreation Center (2,546); Valparaiso, IN
Regular season
Nov. 9*; 7:30 pm, HLN		Georgia Southern	W 85–54	1–0	Athletics-Recreation Center (3,864); Valparaiso, IN
Nov. 13*; 7:00 am, ESPN		Northern Illinois; ESPN College Tip–Off Marathon	W 69–46	2–0	Athletics-Recreation Center (2,445); Valparaiso, IN
Nov. 15*; 8:00 pm, BTN		at Nebraska	L 48–50	2–1	Bob Devaney Sports Center (6,324); Lincoln, NE
Nov. 18*; 1:00 pm, mac-sports.com		at Kent State	W 88–83 ^{OT}	3–1	Memorial Athletic and Convocation Center (1,858); Kent, OH
Nov. 23*; 7:05 pm, HLN		Chicago State	W 67–46	4–1	Athletics–Recreation Center (2,477); Valparaiso, IN
Nov. 24*; 7:05 pm, HLN		Bethune-Cookman	W 77–64	5–1	Athletics–Recreation Center (2,088); Valparaiso, IN
Dec. 2*; 3:30 pm, FSN Midwest		at St. Louis	L 49–62	5–2	Chaifetz Arena (6,357); St. Louis, MO
Dec. 5*; 7:05 pm, HLN		IPFW	W 63–52	6–2	Athletics-Recreation Center (2,179); Valparaiso, IN
Dec. 8*; 8:00 pm, Root		at No. 18 New Mexico	L 52–65	6–3	The Pit (15,244); Albuquerque, NM
Dec. 15*; 7:05 pm		at Missouri State	W 62–54	7–3	JQH Arena (5,465); Springfield, MO
Dec. 17*; 6:00 pm		at Oakland	L 68–70	7–4	Athletics Center O'rena (2,065); Rochester, MI
Dec. 20*; 7:05 pm, HLN		IUPUI	W 89–69	8–4	Athletics-Recreation Center (1,644); Valparaiso, IN
Dec. 22*; 1:35 pm, HLN		Purdue Calumet	W 79–51	9–4	Athletics-Recreation Center (1,681); Valparaiso, IN
Dec. 29*; 2:00 pm, ESPN3		at Murray State	W 66–64	10–4	CFSB Center (4,343); Murray, KY
Jan. 2; 7:05 pm, HLN		Loyola–Chicago	L 54–63	10–5 (0–1)	Athletics–Recreation Center (3,119); Valparaiso, IN
Jan. 4; 6:00 pm, ESPNU		Cleveland State	W 74–50	11–5 (1–1)	Athletics-Recreation Center (3,676); Valparaiso, IN
Jan. 9; 7:00 pm, HLN		at UIC	W 75–70	12–5 (2–1)	UIC Pavilion (3,040); Chicago, IL
Jan. 12; 1:00 pm, ESPN3		at Milwaukee	W 76–52	13–5 (3–1)	Klotsche Center (3,048); Milwaukee, WI
Jan. 17; 6:00 pm, ESPNU		at Detroit	W 89–88	14–5 (4–1)	Calihan Hall (3,418); Detroit, MI
Jan. 19; 7:00 pm, HLN		Wright State	W 69–63	15–5 (5–1)	Athletics-Recreation Center (4,860); Valparaiso, IN
Jan. 23; 7:05 pm, ESPN3		Green Bay	W 73–61	16–5 (6–1)	Athletics-Recreation Center (2,803); Valparaiso, IN
Jan. 30; 6:05 pm, ESPN3		at Youngstown State	L 68–80	16–6 (6–2)	Beeghly Center (2,584); Youngstown, OH
Feb. 1; 7:05 pm, HLN		Milwaukee	W 71–40	17–6 (7–2)	Athletics-Recreation Center (4,013); Valparaiso, IN
Feb. 5; 7:05 pm, HLN		UIC	W 86–61	18–6 (8–2)	Athletics–Recreation Center (2,626); Valparaiso, IN
Feb. 9; 3:00 pm, ESPN2		at Cleveland State	W 80–72	19–6 (9–2)	Wolstein Center (2,403); Cleveland, OH
Feb. 12; 6:00 pm, HLN		at Wright State	W 68–61	20–6 (10–2)	Nutter Center (4,301); Fairborn, OH
Feb. 16; 5:00 pm, ESPN2		Detroit	L 74–84	20–7 (10–3)	Athletics-Recreation Center (5,166); Valparaiso, IN
Feb. 19; 7:00 pm, HLN		at Loyola–Chicago	W 85–76	21–7 (11–3)	Joseph J. Gentile Arena (1,986); Chicago, IL
Feb. 23*; 12:00 pm, ESPNU		Eastern Kentucky; ESPN BracketBusters	W 82–60	22–7	Athletics-Recreation Center (3,329); Valparaiso, IN
Feb. 26; 7:05 pm, HLN		Youngstown State	W 73–64	23–7 (12–3)	Athletics–Recreation Center (3,410); Valparaiso, IN
Mar. 2; 2:00 pm, ESPNU		at Green Bay	W 75–56	24–7 (13–3)	Resch Center (4,868); Green Bay, WI
2013 Horizon League tournament
Mar. 9; 7:30 pm, ESPNU		Green Bay; Semifinal	W 70–69	25–7	Athletics-Recreation Center (3,285); Valparaiso, IN
Mar. 12; 8:00 pm, ESPN		Wright State; Championship Game	W 62–54	26–7	Athletics-Recreation Center (4,457); Valparaiso, IN
2013 NCAA tournament
Mar. 21*; 11:15 am, CBS	No. (14 MW)	vs. No. 9 (3 MW) Michigan State; Second Round	L 54–65	26–8	The Palace of Auburn Hills (18,863); Auburn Hills, MI
*Non-conference game. ^{#}Rankings from Coaches' Poll. (#) Tournament seedings in parentheses. All times are in Central Time. (#) during NCAA Tournament is seed with Region MW=Midwest.
