= 2012–13 Green Bay Phoenix men's basketball team =

American college basketball season

2012–13 Green Bay Phoenix men's basketball

CIT, First Round
- Conference: Horizon League
- Record: 18–16 (10–6 Horizon)
- Head coach: Brian Wardle
- Assistant coaches: Brian Barone; Jimmie Foster; Chrys Cornelius
- Home arena: Resch Center

2012–13 Horizon League men's basketball standings
	Conf.				Overall
Team	W		L	PCT	W		L	PCT
Valparaiso †	13	–	3	.813	26	–	8	.765
Detroit	12	–	4	.750	20	–	13	.606
Wright State	10	–	6	.625	23	–	13	.639
Green Bay	10	–	6	.625	18	–	16	.529
UIC	7	–	9	.438	18	–	16	.529
Youngstown State	7	–	9	.438	18	–	16	.529
Loyola Chicago	5	–	11	.313	15	–	16	.484
Cleveland State	5	–	11	.313	14	–	18	.438
Milwaukee	3	–	13	.188	8	–	24	.250
† 2013 Horizon League Tournament winner As of March 27, 2013; Rankings from AP Poll

The 2012–13 Green Bay Phoenix men's basketball team represented the University of Wisconsin–Green Bay in the 2012–13 NCAA Division I men's basketball season. Their head coach was Brian Wardle who is his 3rd year. The Phoenix played their home games at the Resch Center and were members of the Horizon League. They finished the season 18–16, 10–6 in Horizon League play to finish in a tie for third place. They advanced to the semifinals of the Horizon League tournament where they lost to Valparaiso. They were invited to the 2013 CIT where they lost in the first round to Bradley.

== Roster ==
2012–13 Green Bay Phoenix men's basketball team
Players
Coaches

Pos.	#	Name	Height	Weight	Year	Hometown
G	1	Sultan Muhammad	6 ft 1 in (1.85 m)	194 lb (88 kg)	Jr	Grand Rapids, MI
G	2	Cole Stefan	6 ft 4 in (1.93 m)	193 lb (88 kg)	RS So	Minnetonka, MN
F	4	Jordan Fouse	6 ft 7 in (2.01 m)	220 lb (100 kg)	Fr	Racine, WI.
G	10	Josh Humphrey	6 ft 5 in (1.96 m)	193 lb (88 kg)	RS So	Chicago, IL
G	12	Carrington Love	6 ft 1 in (1.85 m)	171 lb (78 kg)	Fr	Milwaukee, WI
G	13	Kam Cerroni	6 ft 2 in (1.88 m)	192 lb (87 kg)	Jr	Sussex, WI
F	15	Greg Mays	6 ft 9 in (2.06 m)	220 lb (100 kg)	So	Chicago, IL
C	21	Alec Brown	7 ft 1 in (2.16 m)	226 lb (103 kg)	Jr	Winona, MN
F	22	Daniel Turner (injured)	6 ft 6 in (1.98 m)	210 lb (95 kg)	So	McCordsville, IN
G	24	Keifer Sykes	5 ft 11 in (1.8 m)	166 lb (75 kg)	So	Chicago, IL
F	30	Nick Arenz	6 ft 8 in (2.03 m)	225 lb (102 kg)	Fr	Onalaska, WI
F	34	Alfonzo McKinnie	6 ft 8 in (2.03 m)	205 lb (93 kg)	RS Jr	Chicago, IL
F	44	Brennan Cougill	6 ft 9 in (2.06 m)	265 lb (120 kg)	Sr	Sioux City, IA
C	55	Ryan Bross	7 ft 1 in (2.16 m)	248 lb (112 kg)	Fr	Menomonee Falls, WI

Head coach

- Brian Wardle (Marquette)

Assistant coach(es)

- Brian Barone (Marquette)
- Jimmie Foster (South Dakota)
- Chrys Cornelius (Western Illinois)

Legend

- (C) Team captain
- (S) Suspended
- (I) Ineligible
- (W) Walk-on
- Injured
- Current redshirt

Roster
Last update: 2011-10-20

== Schedule ==
Date time, TV	Opponent	Result	Record	Site (attendance) city, state
Exhibition
10/31/2012*; 7:00 pm	St. Norbert	W 83–63		Kress Events Center; Green Bay, WI
Regular season
11/10/2012*; 1:00 pm	Chicago State	W 72–67	1–0	Resch Center (2,249); Green Bay, WI
11/16/2012*; 10:30 pm	vs. Southern Utah; World Vision Classic	W 66–54	2–0	Lawlor Events Center (6,261); Reno, NV
11/17/2012*; 8:00 pm	at Nevada; World Vision Classic	L 69–71	2–1	Lawlor Events Center (6,691); Reno, NV
11/18/2012*; 3:00 pm	vs. Cal State Fullerton; World Vision Classic	L 82–93	2–2	Lawlor Events Center (5,885); Reno, NV
11/20/2012*; 5:05 pm	at Idaho	L 62–72	2–3	Memorial Gym (762); Moscow, ID
11/24/2012*; 7:00 pm	North Dakota State	W 74–59	3–3	Resch Center (2,455); Green Bay, WI
12/01/2012; 3:00 pm, ESPN3	at Virginia	L 51–67	3–4	John Paul Jones Arena (9,600); Charlottesville, VA
12/06/2012*; 7:30 pm	at Tennessee Tech	L 68–74	3–5	Eblen Center (1,550); Cookeville, TN
12/12/2012*; 8:00 pm, BTN	at Wisconsin	L 54–65	3–6	Kohl Center (16,746); Madison, WI
12/15/2012*; 7:00 pm	Southern Illinois	L 70–72	3–7	Resch Center (3,057); Green Bay, WI
12/19/2012*; 7:00 pm	Marquette	W 49–47	4–7	Resch Center (6,733); Green Bay, WI
12/22/2012*; 7:00 pm	South Dakota	W 72–55	5–7	Resch Center (2,247); Green Bay, WI
12/30/2012*; 12:00 pm	Illinois-Springfield	W 84–43	6–7	Resch Center (2,013); Green Bay, WI
01/03/2013; 6:00 pm	at Wright State	L 53–64	6–8 (0–1)	Nutter Center (3,312); Fairborn, OH
01/05/2013; 1:00 pm, HLN/ESPN3	at Detroit	L 76–84	6–9 (0–2)	Calihan Hall (3,016); Detroit, MI
01/09/2013; 7:00 pm	Loyola–Chicago	W 58–45	7–9 (1–2)	Resch Center (2,214); Green Bay, WI
01/12/2013; 3:00 pm	UIC	W 53–47	8–9 (2–2)	Resch Center (2,452); Green Bay, WI
01/17/2013; 7:00 pm, ESPN3	Youngstown State	W 67–58	9–9 (3–2)	Resch Center (2,292); Green Bay, WI
01/19/2013; 1:00 pm, HLN	Cleveland State	W 77–50	10–9 (4–2)	Resch Center (3,803); Green Bay, WI
01/23/2013; 7:05 pm, ESPN3	at Valparaiso	L 61–73	10–10 (4–3)	Athletics–Recreation Center (2,803); Valparaiso, IN
01/25/2013; 8:00 pm, ESPNU	at Milwaukee	W 74–54	11–10 (5–3)	Klotsche Center (3,482); Milwaukee, WI
01/31/2013; 7:00 pm	at UIC	L 57–60	11–11 (5–4)	UIC Pavilion (3,509); Chicago, IL
02/02/2013; 1:00 pm, HLN	at Loyola–Chicago	W 73–65	12–11 (6–4)	Joseph J. Gentile Arena (2,045); Chicago, IL
02/07/2013; 7:00 pm	Wright State	L 68–70 ^{2OT}	12–12 (6–5)	Resch Center (2,522); Green Bay, WI
02/09/2013; 1:00 pm, ESPN3	Detroit	W 68–59	13–12 (7–5)	Resch Center (3,515); Green Bay, WI
02/15/2013; 8:00 pm, ESPNU	at Cleveland State	W 66–59	14–12 (8–5)	Wolstein Center (1,813); Cleveland, OH
02/17/2013; 1:05 pm, ESPN3	at Youngstown State	W 71–54	15–12 (9–5)	Beeghly Center (2,860); Youngstown, OH
02/23/2013*; 7:05 pm	at Drake; BracketBusters	L 54–71	15–13	Knapp Center (3,892); Des Moines, IA
02/26/2013; 7:00 pm, ESPN3	Milwaukee	W 78–61	16–13 (10–5)	Resch Center (3,890); Green Bay, WI
03/02/2013; 2:00 pm, ESPNU	Valparaiso	L 56–75	16–14 (10–6)	Resch Center (4,868); Green Bay, WI
2013 Horizon League men's basketball tournament
03/05/2013; 7:00 pm	Milwaukee; First Round	W 62–46	17–14	Resch Center (1,950); Green Bay, WI
03/08/2013; 7:30 pm, ESPN3	vs. UIC; Quarterfinals	W 64–63	18–14	Athletics–Recreation Center (1,155); Valparaiso, IN
03/09/2013; 7:30 pm, ESPNU	at Valparaiso; Semifinals	L 69–70	18–15	Athletics–Recreation Center (3,285); Valparaiso, IN
2013 CIT
03/20/2013*; 7:00 pm	at Bradley; First Round	L 69–75	18–16	Renaissance Coliseum (1,801); Peoria, IL
*Non-conference game. ^{#}Rankings from AP Poll. (#) Tournament seedings in parentheses. All times are in Central Time..
