= Beech Creek Township, Greene County, Indiana =

Beech Creek Township
- Township
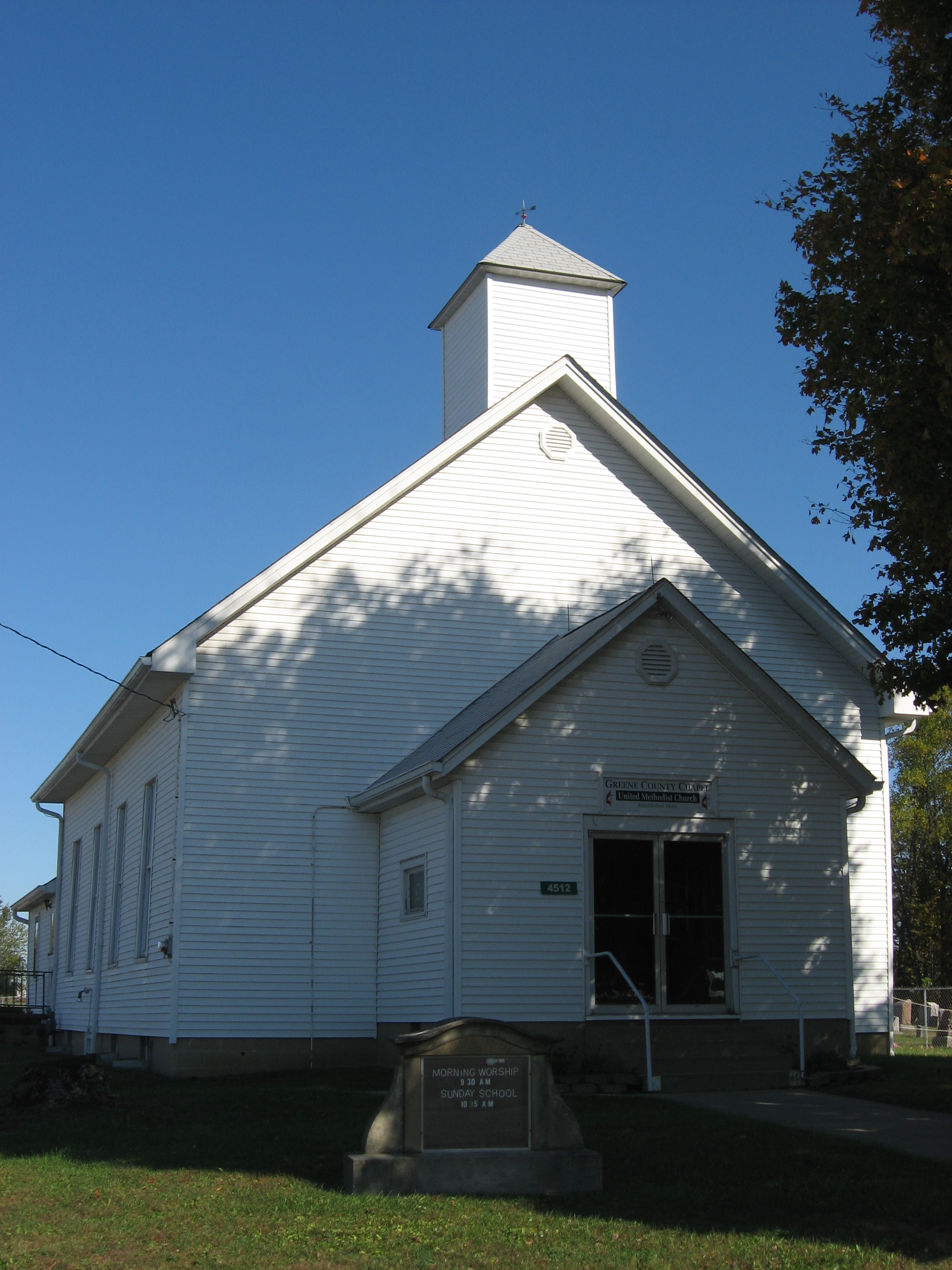
- Greene County Chapel, located in the township's southeast

- Location in Greene County
- Coordinates: 39°07′22″N 86°45′10″W
- Country: United States
- State: Indiana
- County: Greene

Government
  - Type: Indiana township

Area
  - Total: 47.42 sq mi (122.8 km^{2})
  - Land: 47.4 sq mi (123 km^{2})
  - Water: 0.01 sq mi (0.026 km^{2}) 0.02%
- Elevation: 630 ft (192 m)

Population (2020)
  - Total: 2,385
  - Density: 50.3/sq mi (19.4/km^{2})
- GNIS feature ID: 0453104

Beech Creek Township is one of fifteen townships in Greene County, Indiana, USA. As of the 2020 census, its population was 2,385, down from 2,595 at 2010.

Historical population
Census	Pop.	Note	%±
1890	1,591		—
1900	1,506		−5.3%
1910	1,345		−10.7%
1920	1,267		−5.8%
1930	1,099		−13.3%
1940	1,217		10.7%
1950	1,062		−12.7%
1960	982		−7.5%
1970	1,274		29.7%
1980	1,464		14.9%
1990	1,832		25.1%
2000	2,365		29.1%
2010	2,595		9.7%
2020	2,385		−8.1%
Source: US Decennial Census

== Geography ==
According to the 2010 census, the township has a total area of 47.42 square miles (122.8 km^{2}), of which 47.4 square miles (123 km^{2}) (or 99.96%) is land and 0.01 square miles (0.026 km^{2}) (or 0.02%) is water. The stream of Dry Branch runs through this township.

=== Unincorporated towns ===
- Hendricksville
- McVille
- Newark
- Solsberry

(This list is based on USGS data and may include former settlements.)

=== Adjacent townships ===
- Clay Township, Owen County (north)
- Richland Township, Monroe County (northeast)
- Van Buren Township, Monroe County (east)
- Indian Creek Township, Monroe County (southeast)
- Center Township (south)
- Richland Township (southwest)
- Highland Township (west)
- Franklin Township, Owen County (northwest)

=== Cemeteries ===
The township contains ten cemeteries: Arthur, Edwards, Hudson, Liberty, Livingston, Minks, Newark, Philpot, Pryor, and Solsberry.

=== Major highways ===
- SR 43
- SR 45
