= 2012–13 Milwaukee Panthers men's basketball team =

American college basketball season

2012–13 Milwaukee Panthers men's basketball
- Conference: Horizon League
- Record: 8–24 (3–13 Horizon League)
- Head coach: Rob Jeter (8th season)
- Assistant coaches: Duffy Conroy (9th season); Chad Boudreau (8th season); Sharif Chambliss (1st season)
- Home arena: Klotsche Center

2012–13 Horizon League men's basketball standings
	Conf.				Overall
Team	W		L	PCT	W		L	PCT
Valparaiso †	13	–	3	.813	26	–	8	.765
Detroit	12	–	4	.750	20	–	13	.606
Wright State	10	–	6	.625	23	–	13	.639
Green Bay	10	–	6	.625	18	–	16	.529
UIC	7	–	9	.438	18	–	16	.529
Youngstown State	7	–	9	.438	18	–	16	.529
Loyola Chicago	5	–	11	.313	15	–	16	.484
Cleveland State	5	–	11	.313	14	–	18	.438
Milwaukee	3	–	13	.188	8	–	24	.250
† 2013 Horizon League Tournament winner As of March 27, 2013; Rankings from AP Poll

The 2012–13 Milwaukee Panthers men's basketball team represented the University of Wisconsin–Milwaukee during the 2012–13 NCAA Division I men's basketball season. The Panthers, led by head coach Rob Jeter, played their home games at the Klotsche Center and were members of the Horizon League. They finished the season 8–24, 3–13 in Horizon League play to finish in last place. They lost in the first round of the Horizon League tournament to Green Bay.

== Roster ==
#	Name	Height	Weight (lbs.)	Position	Class	Hometown	Previous Team(s)
1	Jordan Aaron	5'10"	160	G	Jr.	Bronx, NY, U.S.	Southeastern CC
3	Kyle Kelm	6'9"	210	F	Jr..	Randolph, WI, U.S.	Randolph HS
5	Joe Tagarelli	6'6"	200	F	Fr.	Waunakee, WI, U.S.	Waunakee HS
10	Thierno Niang	6'1"	205	G	Jr.	Dakar, Senegal	Bridgton Academy/Triton College
12	Donald Thomas	6'7"	190	F	Fr.	Reserve, LA, U.S.	Riverside Academy
14	Paris Gulley	6'2"	170	G	Sr.	Peoria, Il, U.S.	Peoria Manual HS
15	Demetrius Harris	6'7"	230	F	Sr.	Jacksonville, AR, U.S.	Jacksonville HS
20	Mitch Roelke	6'0"	170	G	Jr.	Waunakee, WI, U.S.	Waunakee HS
22	Evan Richard	6'2"	175	G	So.	Kieler, WI, U.S.	Cuba City HS
23	J.J. Panoske	6'10"	225	F	Fr.	Brodhead, WI, U.S.	Brodhead HS
33	Quinton Gustavson	6'9"	200	F	Jr.	Racine, WI, U.S.	Case HS
34	Austin Arians	6'6"	200	F	Fr.	Stoughton, WI, U.S.	Madison Edgewood High School
41	Nick Olson	6'6"	215	F	Jr.	Milwaukee, WI, U.S.	Wauwatosa West HS
42	James Haarsma	6'7"	230	F	Sr.	Racine, WI, U.S.	St. Catherine's HS
44	Ryan Haggerty	6'8"	210	F	Sr.	Glen Ellyn, IL, U.S.	Benet Academy
45	Christian Wolf	6'8"	250	F	Sr.	Kohler, WI, U.S.	Kohler HS

== 2012–13 Schedule and results ==
- All conference games are aired on horizon league.com

Date time, TV	Opponent	Result	Record	Site (attendance) city, state
Exhibition
11/05/2012*; 7:00 pm	UW-Parkside	W 68–67		Klotsche Center (1,501); Milwaukee, WI
Regular season
11/09/2012*; 7:00 pm	Mary	W 76–46	1–0	Klotsche Center (2,137); Milwaukee, WI
11/11/2012*; 2:00 pm, ESPN3	at South Carolina	L 75–82 ^{OT}	1–1	Colonial Life Arena (7,335); Columbia, SC
11/17/2012*; 7:00 pm, Sports 32	Davidson	W 73–68	2–1	Klotsche Center (3,031); Milwaukee, WI
11/19/2012*; 7:00 pm	at Arkansas–Little Rock	L 43–59	2–2	Jack Stephens Center (2,811); Little Rock, AR
11/24/2012*; 3:30 pm	vs. Jacksonville; Hoops for Hope Classic	L 66–71	2–3	Puerto Vallarta International Convention Center (257); Puerto Vallarta
11/25/2012*; 3:30 pm	vs. Rider; Hoops for Hope Classic	L 60–74	2–4	Puerto Vallarta International Convention Center (126); Puerto Vallarta
12/01/2012*; 7:00 pm, ESPN3	at Northern Iowa	L 61–72	2–5	McLeod Center (4,121); Cedar Falls, IA
12/05/2012*; 7:00 pm	Buffalo	L 52–72	2–6	Klotsche Center (1,776); Milwaukee, WI
12/07/2012*; 7:00 pm	Northern Illinois	W 80–73 ^{OT}	3–6	Klotsche Center (2,034); Milwaukee, WI
12/09/2012*; 4:00 pm	at DePaul	L 50–84	3–7	Allstate Arena (7,025); Rosemont, IL
12/12/2012*; 6:00 pm	at Fairfield	L 46–62	3–8	Webster Bank Arena (1,572); Bridgeport, CT
12/15/2012*; 7:00 pm	Tennessee Tech	L 58–69	3–9	Klotsche Center (2,016); Milwaukee, WI
12/22/2012*; 8:15 pm, BTN	at Wisconsin; The I-94 Battle	L 53–74	3–10	Kohl Center (16,465); Madison, WI
12/29/2012*; 12:00 pm	Ohio Dominican	W 95–80	4–10	Klotsche Center (2,078); Milwaukee, WI
01/03/2013; 6:00 pm, ESPN3	at Detroit	L 59–74	4–11 (0–1)	Calihan Hall (2,315); Detroit, MI
01/05/2013; 6:00 pm	at Wright State	L 51–53	4–12 (0–2)	Nutter Center (3,921); Fairborn, OH
01/12/2013; 1:00 pm, Sports 32/ESPN3	Valparaiso	L 52–76	4–13 (0–3)	Klotsche Center (3,048); Milwaukee, WI
01/17/2013; 7:00 pm, Sports 32	Cleveland State	W 69–57	5–13 (1–3)	Klotsche Center (2,017); Milwaukee, WI
01/19/2013; 7:00 pm, Sports 32	Youngstown State	L 72–75	5–14 (1–4)	Klotsche Center (2,706); Milwaukee, WI
01/23/2013; 7:00 pm	at UIC	L 50–60	5–15 (1–5)	UIC Pavilion (3,218); Chicago, IL
01/25/2013; 8:00 pm, ESPNU	Green Bay; The I-43 Battle	L 54–74	5–16 (1–6)	Klotsche Center (3,482); Milwaukee, WI
01/30/2013; 7:00 pm	at Loyola–Chicago	L 65–76	5–17 (1–7)	Joseph J. Gentile Arena (2,067); Chicago, IL
02/01/2013; 7:05 pm	at Valparaiso	L 40–71	5–18 (1–8)	Athletics–Recreation Center (4,013); Valparaiso, IN
02/07/2013; 7:00 pm, Sports 32	Detroit	L 74–82	5–19 (1–9)	Klotsche Center (1,590); Milwaukee, WI
02/09/2013; 7:00 pm, Sports 32	Wright State	L 49–64	5–20 (1–10)	Klotsche Center (2,051); Milwaukee, WI
02/12/2013; 7:00 pm, Sports 32	Loyola–Chicago	W 71–53	6–20 (2–10)	Klotsche Center (1,862); Milwaukee, WI
02/15/2013; 6:05 pm	at Youngstown State	L 80–94	6–21 (2–11)	Beeghly Center (2,817); Youngstown, OH
02/17/2013; 1:00 pm, Sports 32/ESPN3	at Cleveland State	L 67–88	6–22 (2–12)	Wolstein Center (2,839); Cleveland, OH
02/20/2013; 7:00 pm, Sports 32	UIC	W 64–53	7–22 (3–12)	Klotsche Center (1,902); Milwaukee, WI
02/23/2013*; 2:00 pm	at IUPUI; BracketBusters	W 95–88 ^{2OT}	8–22	The Jungle (459); Indianapolis, IN
02/26/2013; 7:00 pm, ESPN3	at Green Bay Phoenix	L 61–78	8–23 (3–13)	Resch Center (3,890); Green Bay, WI
Horizon League tournament
03/05/2013; 7:00 pm, Horizon League.com	at Green Bay Phoenix; First Round	L 46–62	8–24	Resch Center (1,950); Green Bay, WI
*Non-conference game. ^{#}Rankings from AP Poll. (#) Tournament seedings in parentheses. All times are in Central Time.
