= Popcorn, Indiana =

Unincorporated community in Indiana, US

- Unincorporated community
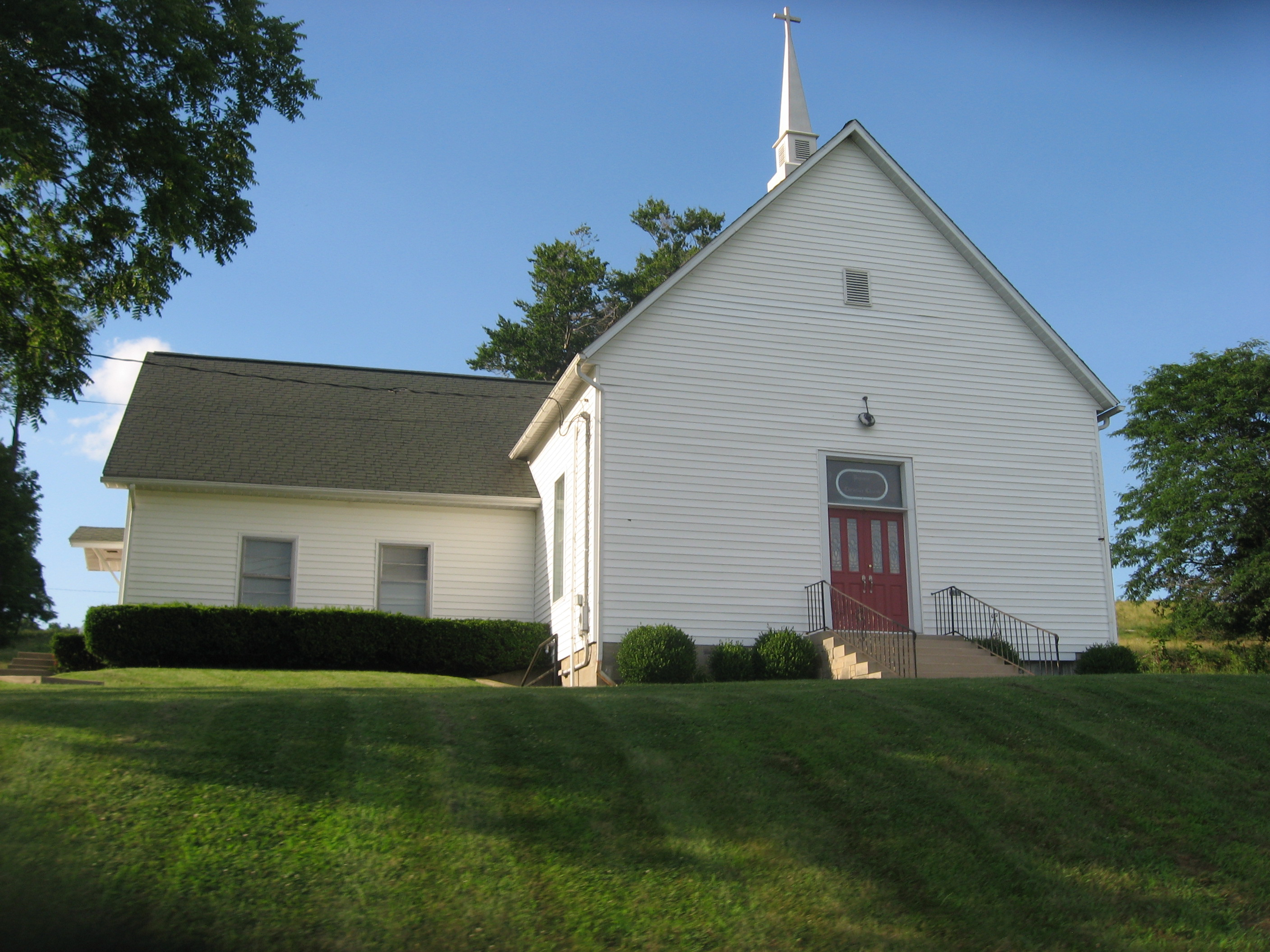
- Popcorn Christian Church

- Location within Indiana Location within the United States
- Coordinates: 38°58′33″N 86°39′25″W
- Country: United States
- State: Indiana
- County: Lawrence
- Township: Perry
- Elevation: 646 ft (197 m)
- ZIP code: 47462
- FIPS code: 18-61056
- GNIS feature ID: 451354

Popcorn is an unincorporated community in Perry Township, Lawrence County, Indiana.

== History ==
Popcorn took its name from Popcorn Creek. A local legend states a visitor from out of town compared the size of local farmers' corn to "popcorn" compared to their own.

A post office called Popcorn was established in 1891, and remained in operation until it was discontinued in 1905.

The town is also known for a brand of kettle corn that takes the name of the town, but the company is not headquartered in the town.
