= 2012–13 Detroit Titans men's basketball team =

American college basketball season

2012–13 Detroit Titans men's basketball
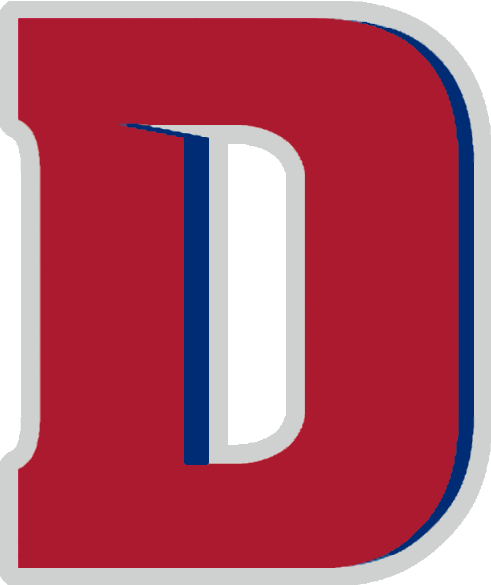

NIT, First Round
- Conference: Horizon League
- Record: 20–13 (12–4 Horizon)
- Head coach: Ray McCallum
- Assistant coaches: Carlos Briggs; Jay Smith
- Home arena: Calihan Hall

2012–13 Horizon League men's basketball standings
	Conf.				Overall
Team	W		L	PCT	W		L	PCT
Valparaiso †	13	–	3	.813	26	–	8	.765
Detroit	12	–	4	.750	20	–	13	.606
Wright State	10	–	6	.625	23	–	13	.639
Green Bay	10	–	6	.625	18	–	16	.529
UIC	7	–	9	.438	18	–	16	.529
Youngstown State	7	–	9	.438	18	–	16	.529
Loyola Chicago	5	–	11	.313	15	–	16	.484
Cleveland State	5	–	11	.313	14	–	18	.438
Milwaukee	3	–	13	.188	8	–	24	.250
† 2013 Horizon League Tournament winner As of March 27, 2013; Rankings from AP Poll

The 2012–13 Detroit Titans men's basketball team represented the University of Detroit Mercy in the 2012–13 NCAA Division I men's basketball season. Their head coach was Ray McCallum. The Titans played their home games at Calihan Hall and were members of the Horizon League. They finished the season 20–13, 12–4 in Horizon League play to finish in second place. They lost in the semifinals of the Horizon League tournament to Wright State. They received an invitation to the 2013 NIT where they lost in the first round to Arizona State.

== Roster ==
2012–13 Detroit Titans men's basketball team
Players
Coaches

Pos.	#	Name	Height	Weight	Year	Hometown
C	00	Olumide Solanke	6 ft 11 in (2.11 m)	244 lb (111 kg)	Jr	Lagos, Nigeria
G	1	Gabriel Dos Santos	6 ft 3 in (1.91 m)	193 lb (88 kg)	Fr	Coral Springs, FL
F	2	Juwan Howard, Jr.	6 ft 6 in (1.98 m)	210 lb (95 kg)	So	Detroit, MI
G	3	Ray McCallum, Jr. (C)	6 ft 3 in (1.91 m)	190 lb (86 kg)	Jr	Beverly Hills, MI
G	4	Carlton Brundidge (redshirt)	6 ft 3 in (1.91 m)	202 lb (92 kg)	So	Southfield, MI
G	5	Tome Ivezaj (W) (redshirt)	6 ft 4 in (1.93 m)	185 lb (84 kg)	Fr	Sterling Heights, MI
G	10	Jason Calliste (C)	6 ft 2 in (1.88 m)	173 lb (78 kg)	Jr	Scarborough, ON
G	11	P.J. Boutte	5 ft 8 in (1.73 m)	151 lb (68 kg)	So	Indianapolis, IN
C	15	Ugochukwu Njoku	6 ft 10 in (2.08 m)	220 lb (100 kg)	Jr	Lagos, Nigeria
F	21	Jermaine Lippert	6 ft 8 in (2.03 m)	230 lb (104 kg)	Jr	Munich, Germany
F	23	Doug Anderson	6 ft 6 in (1.98 m)	212 lb (96 kg)	Sr	Kalamazoo, MI
G	32	Anton Wilson	6 ft 5 in (1.96 m)	191 lb (87 kg)	Fr	Flint, MI
F	33	Evan Bruinsma	6 ft 8 in (2.03 m)	208 lb (94 kg)	Jr	New Era, MI
F	34	Nick Minnerath (C)	6 ft 9 in (2.06 m)	215 lb (98 kg)	Sr	Truro, MA

Head coach

- Ray McCallum (Ball State)

Assistant coach(es)

- Carlos Briggs (Baylor)
- Jay Smith (Saginaw Valley State)
- TBA

Legend

- (C) Team captain
- (S) Suspended
- (I) Ineligible
- (W) Walk-on
- Injured
- Current redshirt

Roster
Last update: 2012-12-03

== Schedule ==
Date time, TV	Rank^{#}	Opponent^{#}	Result	Record	Site (attendance) city, state
Exhibition
10/27/2012*; Horizon League Network		Ryerson	W 87-55		Calihan Hall; Detroit, MI
11/03/2012*; HLN		Tiffin	W 123–71		Calihan Hall (1,288); Detroit, MI
Regular season
11/09/2012*; 7:00 pm, HLN		Northern Michigan	W 88–53	1–0	Calihan Hall (1,429); Detroit, MI
11/13/2012*; 2:00 pm, ESPN		at St. John's; ESPN College Hoops Tipoff Marathon	L 74–77	1–1	Carnesecca Arena (3,506); Queens, NY
11/17/2012*; 7:00 pm, HLN		Drake	W 85–79	2–1	Calihan Hall (2,047); Detroit, MI
11/24/2012*; 2:00 pm, ESPN3		at Miami (FL)	L 62–77	2–2	BankUnited Center (2,946); Coral Gables, FL
11/27/2012*; 7:00 pm		at Bowling Green	L 65–70	2–3	Stroh Center (1,661); Bowling Green, OH
12/01/2012*; 7:00 pm, ESPN3		at Pittsburgh	L 61–74	2–4	Petersen Events Center (9,179); Pittsburgh, PA
12/05/2012*; 7:00 pm, HLN		Toledo	W 79–73	3–4	Calihan Hall (1,552); Detroit, MI
12/08/2012*; 2:00 pm		Rochester	W 102–67	4–4	Calihan Hall (1,340); Detroit, MI
12/10/2012*; 7:30 pm, HLN		Alabama State	W 81–68	5–4	Calihan Hall (1,520); Detroit, MI
12/15/2012*; 12:00 pm, HLN		Akron	W 80–73	6–4	Calihan Hall (1,639); Detroit, MI
12/17/2012*; 7:00 pm, ESPN2		at No. 3 Syracuse; Gotham Classic	L 68–72	6–5	Carrier Dome (17,902); Syracuse, NY
12/19/2012*; 3:00 pm		at Alcorn State; Gotham Classic	W 74–58	7–5	Davey Whitney Complex (50); Lorman, MS
12/30/2012*; 3:00 pm		Canisius; Gotham Classic	W 83–78	8–5	Calihan Hall (2,717); Detroit, MI
01/03/2013; 7:00 pm, ESPN3		Milwaukee	W 74–59	9–5 (1–0)	Calihan Hall (2,315); Detroit, MI
01/05/2013; 2:00 pm, WADL/HLN/ESPN3		Green Bay	W 84–76	10–5 (2–0)	Calihan Hall (3,016); Detroit, MI
01/10/2013; 7:05 pm, HLN		at Youngstown State	W 101–60	11–5 (3–0)	Beeghly Center (2,202); Youngstown, OH
01/12/2013; 4:30 pm, HLN		at Cleveland State	L 62–74	11–6 (3–1)	Wolstein Center (4,101); Cleveland, OH
01/17/2013; 7:00 pm, ESPNU		Valparaiso	L 88–89	11–7 (3–2)	Calihan Hall (3,418); Detroit, MI
01/19/2013; 6:30 pm, FS Detroit/HLN		UIC	W 98–47	12–7 (4–2)	Calihan Hall (4,863); Detroit, MI
01/21/2013; 7:00 pm, HLN		Wright State	L 62–64	12–8 (4–3)	Calihan Hall (2,115); Detroit, MI
01/26/2013; 4:00 pm, HLN/ESPN3		at Loyola–Chicago	W 75–63	13–8 (5–3)	Joseph J. Gentile Arena (2,746); Chicago, IL
01/30/2013; 7:00 pm, HLN		at Wright State	W 83–76	14–8 (6–3)	Nutter Center (4,151); Fairborn, OH
02/01/2013; 9:00 pm, ESPNU		Youngstown State	W 88–77	15–8 (7–3)	Calihan Hall (2,126); Detroit, MI
02/07/2013; 8:00 pm, HLN		at Milwaukee	W 82–74	16–8 (8–3)	Klotsche Center (1,590); Milwaukee, WI
02/09/2013; 2:00 pm, ESPN3/HLN/Sports32		at Green Bay	L 59–68	16–9 (8–4)	Resch Center (3,515); Green Bay, WI
02/12/2013; 7:00 pm, ESPN3		Cleveland State	W 92–62	17–9 (9–4)	Calihan Hall (2,056); Detroit, MI
02/16/2013; 6:00 pm, ESPN2		at Valparaiso	W 84–74	18–9 (10–4)	Athletics–Recreation Center (5,166); Valparaiso, IN
02/23/2013*; 4:00 pm, ESPN2		at Wichita State; ESPN BracketBusters	L 79–94	18–10	Charles Koch Arena (10,425); Wichita, KS
02/26/2013; 7:30 pm, HLN		Loyola–Chicago	W 76–75	19–10 (11–4)	Calihan Hall (1,357); Detroit, MI
02/28/2013*; 7:00 pm, ESPN3		at Temple; Gotham Classic	L 78–83	19–11	Liacouras Center (4,452); Philadelphia, PA
03/02/2013; 2:00 pm, HLN		UIC	W 79–67	20–11 (12–4)	UIC Pavilion (3,560); Chicago, IL
2013 Horizon League tournament
03/09/2013; 6:00 pm, ESPN3		vs. Wright State; Semifinals	L 54–56	20–12	Athletics–Recreation Center (3,285); Valparaiso, IN
2013 NIT
03/20/2013*; 10:00 pm, ESPNU	No. (6)	at (3) Arizona State; First Round	L 68–83	20–13	Wells Fargo Arena (3,519); Tempe, AZ
*Non-conference game. ^{#}Rankings from AP Poll. (#) Tournament seedings in parentheses. All times are in Eastern Time. (#) during NIT is seed within region.
