= Newark, Indiana =

- Unincorporated community
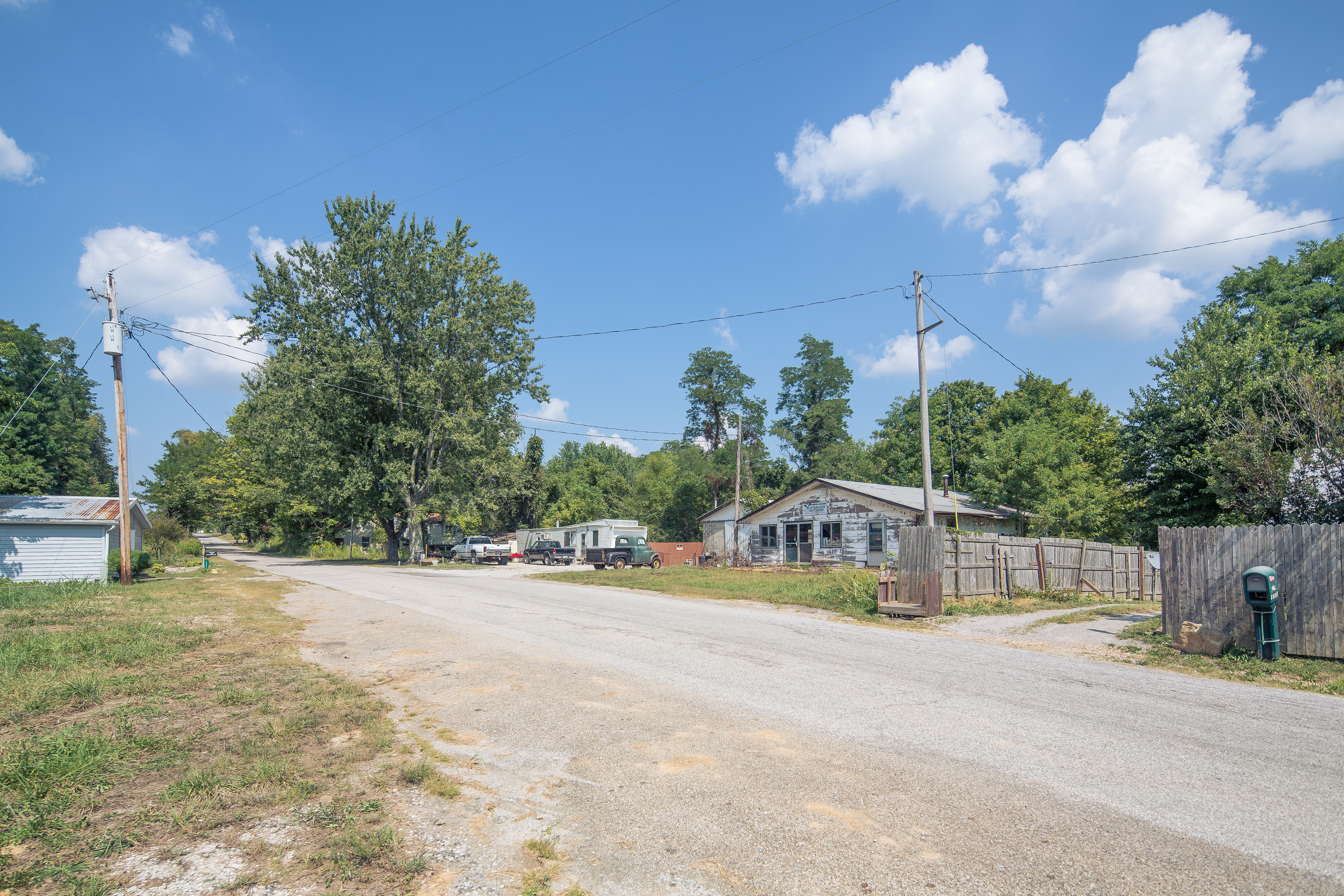

- Location within Indiana Location within the United States
- Coordinates: 39°07′44″N 86°48′26″W
- Country: United States
- State: Indiana
- County: Greene
- Township: Beech Creek
- Elevation: 774 ft (236 m)
- ZIP code: 47459
- FIPS code: 18-52416
- GNIS feature ID: 440132

Newark is an unincorporated community in Beech Creek Township, Greene County, Indiana.

== History ==
Newark was named after Newark, Ohio. A post office was established at Newark in 1866, and remained in operation until it was discontinued in 1910.
