= 2012–13 UIC Flames men's basketball team =

American college basketball season

2012–13 UIC Flames men's basketball

CIT, Second Round
- Conference: Horizon League
- Record: 18–16 (7–9 Horizon)
- Head coach: Howard Moore
- Assistant coaches: Al Biancalana; Donnie Kirksey; Stew Robinson
- Home arena: UIC Pavilion

2012–13 Horizon League men's basketball standings
| | Conf. | | | | Overall |
| Team | W | | L | PCT | W | | L | PCT |
|---|---|---|---|---|---|---|---|---|
| Valparaiso † | 13 | – | 3 | .813 | 26 | – | 8 | .765 |
| Detroit | 12 | – | 4 | .750 | 20 | – | 13 | .606 |
| Wright State | 10 | – | 6 | .625 | 23 | – | 13 | .639 |
| Green Bay | 10 | – | 6 | .625 | 18 | – | 16 | .529 |
| UIC | 7 | – | 9 | .438 | 18 | – | 16 | .529 |
| Youngstown State | 7 | – | 9 | .438 | 18 | – | 16 | .529 |
| Loyola Chicago | 5 | – | 11 | .313 | 15 | – | 16 | .484 |
| Cleveland State | 5 | – | 11 | .313 | 14 | – | 18 | .438 |
| Milwaukee | 3 | – | 13 | .188 | 8 | – | 24 | .250 |
† 2013 Horizon League Tournament winner As of March 27, 2013; Rankings from AP Poll

The 2011–12 UIC Flames men's basketball team represented the University of Illinois at Chicago in the 2011–12 NCAA Division I men's basketball season. Their head coach was Howard Moore, serving his third year. The Flames played their home games at the UIC Pavilion and were members of the Horizon League. They finished the season 18–16, 7–9 in Horizon League play to finish in a tie for fifth place. They lost in the quarterfinals of the Horizon League tournament to Green Bay. They were invited to the 2013 CIT where they defeated Chicago State in the first round before losing in the second round to Northern Iowa.

== Roster ==
2012–13 UIC Flames men's basketball team
Players
Coaches

| Pos. | # | Name | Height | Weight | Year | Hometown |
|---|---|---|---|---|---|---|
| G | 0 | Sammy Sutter | 6 ft 2 in (1.88 m) | 169 lb (77 kg) | So | Bartlett, IL |
| G | 1 | Daniel Barnes | 6 ft 2 in (1.88 m) | 168 lb (76 kg) | RS Sr | Oak Park, IL |
| G | 2 | Gabe Snider | 6 ft 4 in (1.93 m) | 175 lb (79 kg) | Fr | Chicago, IL |
| G | 3 | Joey Miller | 6 ft 3 in (1.91 m) | 170 lb (77 kg) | So | Charleston, IL |
| G | 4 | Gary Talton | 6 ft 1 in (1.85 m) | 163 lb (74 kg) | Sr | Dallas, TX |
| G | 10 | Marc Brown | 6 ft 4 in (1.93 m) | 198 lb (90 kg) | So | Dallas, TX |
| G/F | 11 | Austin Angel | 6 ft 4 in (1.93 m) | 190 lb (86 kg) | Fr | Wilmette, IL |
| F | 13 | Hayden Humes | 6 ft 8 in (2.03 m) | 216 lb (98 kg) | RS Jr | Valparaiso, IN |
| G | 20 | Anthony Kelley | 6 ft 6 in (1.98 m) | 189 lb (86 kg) | Sr | Aurora, IL |
| G | 23 | Jay Parker | 5 ft 10 in (1.78 m) | 169 lb (77 kg) | So | Harvey, IL |
| G | 25 | Ngijol Songolo | 6 ft 4 in (1.93 m) | 167 lb (76 kg) | Fr | Madison, WI |
| C | 30 | Matt Gorski | 7 ft 0 in (2.13 m) | 244 lb (111 kg) | Fr | Chesterfield, VA |
| G | 31 | Kelsey Barlow | 6 ft 5 in (1.96 m) | 200 lb (91 kg) | Sr | Indianapolis, IN |
| F | 33 | Ahmen Fells | 6 ft 5 in (1.96 m) | 183 lb (83 kg) | So | Chicago, IL |
| C | 34 | Josh Crittle | 6 ft 9 in (2.06 m) | 260 lb (118 kg) | Sr | Bellwood, IL |
| F | 40 | Jake Wiegand | 6 ft 8 in (2.03 m) | 224 lb (102 kg) | Fr | Herndon, VA |
| C | 44 | Will Simonton | 6 ft 10 in (2.08 m) | 217 lb (98 kg) | So | Vienna, VA |

Head coach

- Howard Moore (Wisconsin)

Assistant coach(es)

- Al Biancalana (Elmhurst)
- Donnie Kirksey (Roosevelt)
- Stew Robinson (Indiana)

Legend

- (C) Team captain
- (S) Suspended
- (I) Ineligible
- (W) Walk-on
- Injured
- Current redshirt

Roster
Last update: 2012-10-07

== Schedule ==
| Date time, TV | Opponent | Result | Record | Site (attendance) city, state |
Exhibition
| 11/07/2012*; 7:00 pm | UW–Platteville | W 56–49 | | UIC Pavilion; Chicago, IL |
Regular season
| 11/11/2012*; 1:00 pm | UC Riverside | W 59–52 | 1–0 | UIC Pavilion (2,212); Chicago, IL |
| 11/16/2012*; 3:00 pm, CBSSN | vs. New Mexico; Paradise Jam tournament quarterfinals | L 59–66 | 1–1 | Sports and Fitness Center (N/A); Saint Thomas, VI |
| 11/17/2012*; 1:30 pm, CBSSN | vs. Mercer; Paradise Jam Tournament | W 62–36 | 2–1 | Sports and Fitness Center (N/A); St. Thomas, VI |
| 11/19/2012*; 4:00 pm, CBSSN | vs. Iona; Paradise Jam Tournament | W 86–81 | 3–1 | Sports and Fitness Center (920); St. Thomas, VI |
| 11/24/2012*; 3:00 pm | SE Missouri State | W 56–45 | 4–1 | UIC Pavilion (2,542); Chicago, IL |
| 11/27/2012*; 7:00 pm | at Northern Illinois | W 58–46 | 5–1 | Convocation Center (947); DeKalb, IL |
| 12/01/2012*; 1:00 pm, CSN Chicago | at Northwestern | W 50–44 | 6–1 | Welsh-Ryan Arena (5,838); Evanston, IL |
| 12/05/2012*; 7:00 pm | Roosevelt | W 81–43 | 7–1 | UIC Pavilion (3,091); Chicago, IL |
| 12/08/2012*; 3:00 pm | Colorado State | W 64–55 | 8–1 | UIC Pavilion (3,380); Chicago, IL |
| 12/15/2012*; 1:00 pm | Eastern Michigan | W 74–48 | 9–1 | UIC Pavilion (3,274); Chicago, IL |
| 12/18/2012*; 7:00 pm | at Western Illinois | L 54–70 | 9–2 | Western Hall (1,748); Macomb, IL |
| 12/22/2012*; 12:30 pm | at Miami (OH) | L 70–82 | 9–3 | Millett Hall (1,122); Oxford, OH |
| 12/29/2012*; 1:00 pm | at Toledo | L 55–74 | 9–4 | Savage Arena (3,617); Toledo, OH |
| 01/02/2013; 7:00 pm | Youngstown State | W 65–60 | 10–4 (1–0) | UIC Pavilion (1,789); Chicago, IL |
| 01/07/2013; 5:00 pm | at Cleveland State | L 50–60 | 10–5 (1–1) | Wolstein Center (1,367); Cleveland, OH |
| 01/09/2013; 7:00 pm | Valparaiso | L 70–75 | 10–6 (1–2) | UIC Pavilion (3,040); Chicago, IL |
| 01/12/2013; 3:00 pm | at Green Bay | L 47–53 | 10–7 (1–3) | Resch Center (2,452); Green Bay, WI |
| 01/16/2013; 7:00 pm | Loyola–Chicago | W 61–59 | 11–7 (2–3) | UIC Pavilion (3,917); Chicago, IL |
| 01/19/2013; 5:30 pm | at Detroit | L 47–98 | 11–8 (2–4) | Calihan Hall (4,863); Detroit, MI |
| 01/23/2013; 7:00 pm | Milwaukee | W 60–50 | 12–8 (3–4) | UIC Pavilion (3,218); Chicago, IL |
| 01/26/2013; 6:00 pm | at Wright State | W 55–49 | 13–8 (4–4) | Nutter Center (8,065); Fairborn, OH |
| 01/31/2013; 7:00 pm | Green Bay | W 60–57 | 14–8 (5–4) | UIC Pavilion (3,509); Chicago, IL |
| 02/02/2013; 7:00 pm | Cleveland State | L 66–77 | 14–9 (5–5) | UIC Pavilion (2,516); Chicago, IL |
| 02/05/2013; 7:05 pm | at Valparaiso | L 61–86 | 14–10 (5–6) | Athletics–Recreation Center (2,626); Valparaiso, IN |
| 02/10/2013; 1:05 pm | at Youngstown State | W 88–83 ^{3OT} | 15–10 (6–6) | Beeghly Center (2,374); Youngstown, OH |
| 02/16/2013; 1:00 pm, ESPN3 | at Loyola–Chicago | L 60–69 | 15–11 (6–7) | Gentile Arena (3,263); Chicago, IL |
| 02/20/2013; 7:00 pm | at Milwaukee | L 53–64 | 15–12 (6–8) | Klotsche Center (1,902); Milwaukee, WI |
| 02/23/2013*; 3:00 pm, ESPN3 | Bradley; BracketBusters | L 62–63 | 15–13 | UIC Pavilion (3,831); Chicago, IL |
| 02/26/2013; 7:00 pm | Wright State | W 60–55 | 16–13 (7–8) | UIC Pavilion (2,951); Chicago, IL |
| 03/02/2013; 1:00 pm | Detroit | L 67–79 | 16–14 (7–9) | UIC Pavilion (3,560); Chicago, IL |
2013 Horizon League tournament
| 03/05/2013; 7:00 pm | Cleveland State; First Round | W 82–59 | 17–14 | UIC Pavilion (948); Chicago, IL |
| 03/08/2013; 7:30 pm, ESPN3 | vs. Green Bay; Quarterfinals | L 63–64 | 17–15 | Athletics–Recreation Center (1,155); Valparaiso, IN |
2013 CIT
| 03/20/2013*; 7:00 pm | Chicago State; First Round | W 80–69 | 18–15 | UIC Pavilion (2,417); Chicago, IL |
| 03/23/2013*; 7:00 pm | at Northern Iowa; Second Round | L 51–63 | 18–16 | McLeod Center (3,025); Cedar Falls, IA |
*Non-conference game. ^{#}Rankings from Coaches' Poll. (#) Tournament seedings in parentheses. All times are in Central Time.
