= McVille, Indiana =

- Unincorporated community
- Location within Indiana Location within the United States
- Coordinates: 39°09′11″N 86°44′19″W
- Country: United States
- State: Indiana
- County: Greene
- Township: Beech Creek
- Elevation: 833 ft (254 m)
- ZIP code: 47459
- FIPS code: 18-45855
- GNIS feature ID: 452063

McVille is an unincorporated community in Beech Creek Township, Greene County, Indiana.

== History ==
McVille was originally called McHaleysville, and under the latter name was founded in 1836 by John McHaley. A post office was established at McVille in 1879, and remained in operation until it was discontinued in 1916.
