= Hobbieville, Indiana =

- Unincorporated community
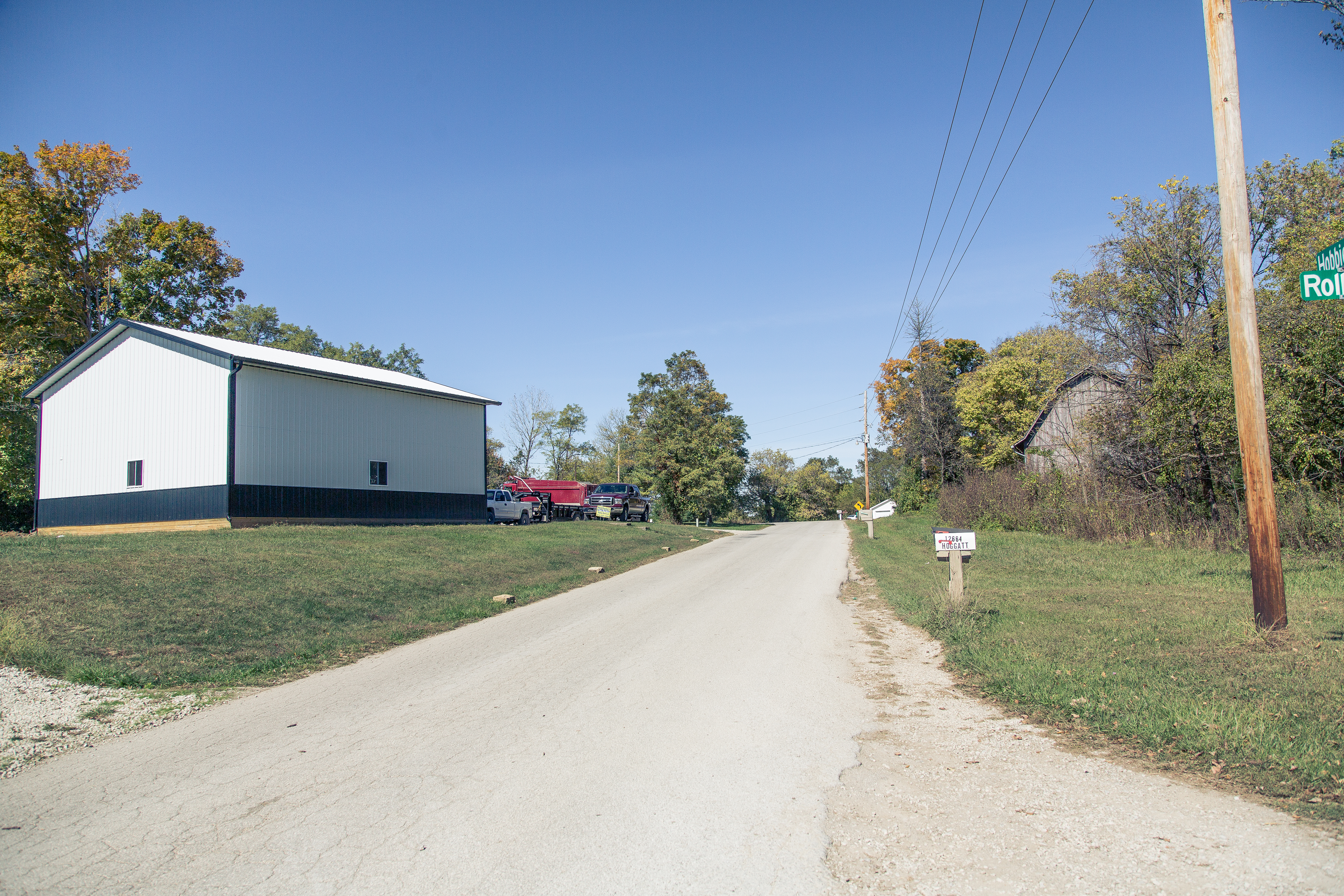

- Location within Indiana Location within the United States
- Coordinates: 38°59′59″N 86°42′32″W
- Country: United States
- State: Indiana
- County: Greene
- Township: Center
- Elevation: 787 ft (240 m)
- ZIP code: 47462
- FIPS code: 18-34150
- GNIS feature ID: 451047

Hobbieville is an unincorporated community in Center Township, Greene County, Indiana.

== History ==
Hobbieville was originally called Jonesboro, and under the latter name was founded in 1837. A post office was established as Hobbieville in 1840, and it remained in operation until it was discontinued in 1935.
