= 2012–13 Loyola Ramblers men's basketball team =

American college basketball season

2012–13 Loyola Ramblers men's basketball
- Conference: Horizon League
- Record: 15–16 (5–11 Horizon)
- Head coach: Porter Moser (2nd season)
- Assistant coaches: Armon Gates; Rick Malnati; Jason Gardner
- Home arena: Joseph J. Gentile Arena

2012–13 Horizon League men's basketball standings
	Conf.				Overall
Team	W		L	PCT	W		L	PCT
Valparaiso †	13	–	3	.813	26	–	8	.765
Detroit	12	–	4	.750	20	–	13	.606
Wright State	10	–	6	.625	23	–	13	.639
Green Bay	10	–	6	.625	18	–	16	.529
UIC	7	–	9	.438	18	–	16	.529
Youngstown State	7	–	9	.438	18	–	16	.529
Loyola Chicago	5	–	11	.313	15	–	16	.484
Cleveland State	5	–	11	.313	14	–	18	.438
Milwaukee	3	–	13	.188	8	–	24	.250
† 2013 Horizon League Tournament winner As of March 27, 2013; Rankings from AP Poll

The 2012–13 Loyola Ramblers men's basketball team represented Loyola University Chicago during the 2012–13 NCAA Division I men's basketball season. The Ramblers, led by second year head coach Porter Moser, played their home games at the Joseph J. Gentile Arena and were members of the Horizon League. They finished the season 15–16, 5–11 in Horizon League play to finish in seventh place. They lost in the first round of the Horizon League tournament to Youngstown State.

This was the Ramblers final season as a member of the Horizon League. In July, 2013 they will become a member of the Missouri Valley Conference.

== Roster ==
Number	Name	Position	Height	Weight	Year	Hometown
0	Kody Williams	Guard	6–2	190	Junior	Niceville, Florida
1	Cully Payne	Guard	6–1	180	Junior	Schaumburg, Illinois
2	Jordan Hicks	Guard/Forward	6–6	210	Senior	Rochester, Minnesota
4	Devon Turk	Guard	6–4	170	Freshman	Houston, Texas
5	Joe Crisman	Guard	6–4	195	Sophomore	Munster, Indiana
13	London Dokubo	Guard	6–0	165	Sophomore	Schaumburg, Illinois
22	Matt O'Leary	Forward	6–8	210	Freshman	Terre Haute, Indiana
23	Jeff White	Guard	6–1	160	Freshman	Peoria, Illinois
24	Ben Averkamp	Forward	6–8	235	Senior	Germantown, Wisconsin
25	Nick Osborne	Forward	6–8	220	Freshman	Muncie, Indiana
30	Tanner Williams	Forward	6–7	205	Freshman	Orion, Illinois
32	Christian Thomas	Guard/Forward	6–5	207	Sophomore	St. Louis, Missouri
33	Jeremy King	Center	6–10	209	Freshman	Houston, Texas
35	Milton Doyle	Guard	6–4	170	Freshman	Chicago, Illinois
44	Derrick Boone	Guard	6–3	180	Junior	Minneapolis, Minnesota
45	Bill Clark	Guard	6–4	207	Junior	Valparaiso, Indiana

== Schedule ==
Date time, TV	Opponent	Result	Record	Site (attendance) city, state
Exhibition
11/03/2012*; 4:00 pm	Ferris State	W 61–46		Joseph J. Gentile Arena (1,247); Chicago, IL
Regular season
11/09/2012*; 7:00 pm	Toledo	W 62–50	1–0	Joseph J. Gentile Arena (2,187); Chicago, IL
11/12/2012*; 7:00 pm	Rockhurst	W 64–41	2–0	Joseph J. Gentile Arena (1,685); Chicago, IL
11/16/2012*; 4:00 pm	vs. Western Michigan; USF Invitational	L 71–81	2–1	USF Sun Dome (3,931); Tampa, FL
11/17/2012*; 6:30 pm	at South Florida; USF Invitational	L 50–68	2–2	USF Sun Dome (4,014); Tampa, FL
11/18/2012*; 11:00 am	vs. Maryland–Eastern Shore; USF Invitational	W 62–46	3–2	USF Sun Dome (3,612); Tampa, FL
11/24/2012*; 3:00 pm	at Northern Illinois	W 53–46	4–2	Convocation Center (995); DeKalb, IL
11/28/2012*; 7:00 pm	Tennessee Tech	W 81–78	5–2	Joseph J. Gentile Arena (1,812); Chicago, IL
12/01/2012*; 2:00 pm, CSN Chicago	Furman	W 77–50	6–2	Joseph J. Gentile Arena (2,147); Chicago, IL
12/08/2012*; 1:00 pm, BTN	at No. 19 Michigan State	L 61–73	6–3	Breslin Center (14,797); East Lansing, MI
12/15/2012*; 7:00 pm, ESPNU	Mississippi State	W 59–51	7–3	Joseph J. Gentile Arena (3,321); Chicago, IL
12/22/2012*; 1:00 pm	at Saint Peter's	W 54–49	8–3	Yanitelli Center (789); Jersey City, NJ
12/29/2012*; 1:00 pm, WCIU/ESPN3	at DePaul	W 69–61	9–3	Allstate Arena (8,020); Rosemont, IL
01/02/2013; 7:05 pm	at Valparaiso	W 63–54	10–3 (1–0)	Athletics–Recreation Center (3,119); Valparaiso, IN
01/05/2013; 3:00 pm	Youngstown State	L 66–68	10–4 (1–1)	Joseph J. Gentile Arena (2,109); Chicago, IL
01/09/2013; 7:00 pm	at Green Bay	L 45–58	10–5 (1–2)	Resch Center (2,214); Green Bay, WI
01/11/2013; 8:00 pm, ESPNU	at Wright State	L 61–62	10–6 (1–3)	Nutter Center (2,258); Fairborn, OH
01/16/2013; 7:00 pm	at UIC	L 59–61	10–7 (1–4)	UIC Pavilion (3,917); Chicago, IL
01/20/2013*; 7:05 pm, Lakeshore PTV/ESPN3	at Chicago State	W 66–63 ^{OT}	11–7	Emil and Patricia Jones Convocation Center (1,159); Chicago, IL
01/23/2013; 6:00 pm	at Cleveland State	W 67–55	12–7 (2–4)	Wolstein Center (1,565); Cleveland, OH
01/26/2013; 3:00 pm, CSN Chicago/ESPN3	Detroit	L 63–75	12–8 (2–5)	Joseph J. Gentile Arena (2,746); Chicago, IL
01/30/2013; 7:00 pm	Milwaukee	W 76–65	13–8 (3–5)	Joseph J. Gentile Arena (2,067); Chicago, IL
02/02/2013; 1:00 pm	Green Bay	L 65–73	13–9 (3–6)	Joseph J. Gentile Arena (2,045); Chicago, IL
02/04/2013; 6:00 pm	at Wright State	L 59–62	13–10 (3–7)	Nutter Center (3,171); Fairborn, OH
02/07/2013; 6:45 pm	at Youngstown State	L 59–60	13–11 (3–8)	Beeghly Center (1,844); Youngstown, OH
02/12/2013; 7:00 pm	at Milwaukee	L 53–71	13–12 (3–9)	Klotsche Center (1,862); Milwaukee, WI
02/16/2013; 1:00 pm, CSN Chicago/ESPN3	UIC	W 69–60	14–12 (4–9)	Joseph J. Gentile Arena (3,263); Chicago, IL
02/19/2013; 7:00 pm	Valparaiso	L 76–85	14–13 (4–10)	Joseph J. Gentile Arena (1,986); Chicago, IL
02/23/2013*; 2:00 pm	Kent State; BracketBusters	L 63–70	14–14	Joseph J. Gentile Arena (1,945); Chicago, IL
02/26/2013; 6:30 pm	at Detroit	L 75–76	14–15 (4–11)	Calihan Hall (1,357); Detroit, MI
03/02/2013; 2:00 pm	Cleveland State	W 87–60	15–15 (5–11)	Joseph J. Gentile Arena (2,317); Chicago, IL
Horizon League tournament
03/05/2013; 6:05 pm	at Youngstown State; First Round	L 60–62	15–16	Beeghly Center (2,270); Youngstown, OH
*Non-conference game. ^{#}Rankings from Coaches' Poll. (#) Tournament seedings in parentheses. All times are in Central Time.
