= Popcorn, Indiana (brand) =

Popcorn brand

Popcorn Indiana (originally Popcorn, Indiana)
- Product type: Popcorn
- Current owner: Eagle Foods
- Country: United States
- Introduced: 2002; 24 years ago
- Markets: United States
- Tagline: We live for Popcorn
- Website: popcornindiana.com Original website

Popcorn Indiana, originally named Popcorn, Indiana, is an American brand of popcorn that was introduced in 2002. The company was originally headquartered in Westport, Connecticut, with additional operations in Indianapolis, Indiana, which is approximately 72 miles north of Popcorn, Indiana, the town that inspired its name. As of 2017, the company is owned by Eagle Family Foods.

The company is known for producing a variety of popcorn snacks, with an emphasis on healthier ingredients and sustainable practices.

== History ==
Popcorn, Indiana was founded in 2002 by entrepreneurs Warren Struhl and Richard Demb. The inspiration for the company came after a visit to the small town of Popcorn, Indiana, where they met Dale Humphrey, the town's mayor. During their visit, Humphrey shared stories about the community’s deep ties to farming, which fueled their idea for a business centered on gourmet popcorn. They named their new company after the town. They started with an online sales and a small shop in Manhattan.

Their first year saw $1 million in sales. The company attracted notable investors, including Isiah Thomas, former NBA player and executive with the New York Knicks, and Goldman Sachs & Co.

Thomas got involved early on, when he was president of the Knicks, and he was walking in Manhattan and, attracted by the smell from the Popcorn, Indiana, he stopped into the shop. At the time, he was serving as the official spokesman for the U.S. Popcorn Board. He invested in the popcorn company and became a member of the company's management committee.

The popcorn brand "Dale and Thomas" was created in 2004 by Struhl and Demb, named after the Dale Humphrey, the mayor of Popcorn, Indiana and Isiah Thomas. Dale and Thomas manufactured "chef crafted, gourmet, popcorn products", and at one time offered over 100 flavors.

Popcorn, Indiana’s growth was fueled by a combination of strong marketing, high-quality products, and partnerships with retailers across the U.S.

In August 2017, Eagle Family Foods, a manufacturer of condensed milks and snacks, acquired the brand, which is now named "Popcorn Indiana".

== Products ==
Popcorn Indiana's ready-to-eat popcorns are free from trans fats, gluten, preservatives, and genetically modified foods (GMOS). Most products are cholesterol-free, and some flavors are available in an organic variety. The products are also produced without artificial colors. There are two main types of products from PopcornIndiana: Classic Popcorn and Drizzlecorn. Its products are also certified by the Whole Grains Council.

== Class action lawsuit challenging company name ==
In 2022, a class action lawsuit was filed against Eagle Family Foods, parent company of Popcorn Indiana, claiming the name was deceptive as the product is neither from nor made in Indiana. They note that Popcorn is the official snack of Indiana; the popcorn industry started in Indiana; and Indiana ranks second in the nation in popcorn production only to Nebraska. They also note a connection between the state and Orville Redenbacher, an Indiana native whose eponymous popcorn brand was founded there. The suit claims that "Due to this long history and roots in Indiana, popcorn made in Indiana from start to finish is generally believed to be of higher quality than popcorn made in other locations." As such, consumers are being deceived by the name "Popcorn Indiana".

In 2023, the case was dismissed without prejudice, by Judge Pratt, Chief Judge of the United States District Court for the Southern District of Indiana.

== See also ==
- List of popcorn brands
