= 2012–13 Youngstown State Penguins men's basketball team =

American college basketball season

2012–13 Youngstown State Penguins men's basketball

CIT, Second Round
- Conference: Horizon League
- Record: 18–16 (7–9 Horizon)
- Head coach: Jerry Slocum (8th season)
- Assistant coaches: Michael Wernicki; Brian DePaoli; Steve Hall
- Home arena: Beeghly Center

2012–13 Horizon League men's basketball standings
	Conf.				Overall
Team	W		L	PCT	W		L	PCT
Valparaiso †	13	–	3	.813	26	–	8	.765
Detroit	12	–	4	.750	20	–	13	.606
Wright State	10	–	6	.625	23	–	13	.639
Green Bay	10	–	6	.625	18	–	16	.529
UIC	7	–	9	.438	18	–	16	.529
Youngstown State	7	–	9	.438	18	–	16	.529
Loyola Chicago	5	–	11	.313	15	–	16	.484
Cleveland State	5	–	11	.313	14	–	18	.438
Milwaukee	3	–	13	.188	8	–	24	.250
† 2013 Horizon League Tournament winner As of March 27, 2013; Rankings from AP Poll

The 2012–13 Youngstown State Penguins men's basketball team represented Youngstown State University during the 2012–13 NCAA Division I men's basketball season. The Penguins, led by eighth year head coach Jerry Slocum, played their home games at the Beeghly Center and were members of the Horizon League. They finished the season 18–16, 7–9 in Horizon League play to finish in a tie for sixth place. They lost in the quarterfinals of the Horizon League tournament to Wright State. They were invited to the 2013 CIT, the programs first ever Division I postseason tournament appearance, where they defeated Oakland in the first round before losing in the second round to Canisius in overtime.

== Roster ==
Number	Name	Position	Height	Weight	Year	Hometown
1	Blake Allen	Guard	6–1	180	Senior	Tampa, Florida
3	Kendrick Perry	Guard	6–0	160	Junior	Ocoee, Florida
4	Shawn Amiker	Guard	6–4	175	Sophomore	Oak Park, Michigan
5	Kamren Belin	Forward	6–7	225	Junior	Atlanta, Georgia
11	D. J. Cole	Guard	5–11	175	Sophomore	Olathe, Kansas
14	Josh Chojnacki	Forward	6–9	240	Junior	Erie, Pennsylvania
20	Bobby Hain	Forward	6–10	235	Freshman	Jupiter, Florida
21	Damian Eargle	Forward	6–7	215	Senior	Youngstown, Ohio
23	Ronnye Beamon	Guard	6–4	195	Freshman	Calumet City, Illinois
24	Danny Reese	Guard	5–11	160	Sophomore	Youngstown, Ohio
25	Fletcher Larson	Forward	6–8	215	Sophomore	Lakewood, New York
32	Larry Johnson Jr.	Forward	6–4	220	Sophomore	Oak Park, Michigan
33	Ryan Weber	Forward	6–6	200	Freshman	Indianapolis, Indiana
42	Jake Huha	Guard	6–1	180	Freshman	Effort, Pennsylvania

== Schedule ==
Date time, TV	Opponent	Result	Record	Site (attendance) city, state
Regular season
11/10/2012*; 4:00 pm	at George Washington	W 80–73	1–0	Charles E. Smith Athletic Center (2,198); Washington, D.C.
11/12/2012*; 7:00 pm, ESPNU	at Georgia; Legends Classic	W 68–56	2–0	Stegeman Coliseum (4,275); Athens, GA
11/16/2012*; 7:05 pm	Saint Francis (PA)	W 75–60	3–0	Beeghly Center (2,023); Youngstown, OH
11/19/2012*; 4:30 pm	vs. North Dakota State; Legends Classic	L 80–83 ^{OT}	3–1	Palumbo Center (2,166); Pittsburgh, PA
11/20/2012*; 4:30 am	vs. James Madison; Legends Classic	L 68–69	3–2	Palumbo Center (2,060); Pittsburgh, PA
11/21/2012*; 7:00 pm	at Duquesne; Legends Classic	L 74–84	3–3	Palumbo Center (2,325); Pittsburgh, PA
11/28/2012*; 7:05 pm	Kent State	L 78–85 ^{OT}	3–4	Beeghly Center (3,108); Youngstown, OH
12/01/2012*; 2:00 pm	at Bowling Green	W 58–49	4–4	Stroh Center (1,624); Bowling Green, OH
12/06/2012*; 7:05 pm	Geneva	W 93–50	5–4	Beeghly Center (1,581); Youngstown, OH
12/08/2012*; 7:05 pm	Hiram	W 71–44	6–4	Covelli Centre (1,576); Youngstown, OH
12/18/2012*; 7:00 pm, ESPN3	at South Florida	L 54–72	6–5	USF Sun Dome (3,680); Tampa, FL
12/21/2012*; 7:00 pm	at Bethune–Cookman	W 67–51	7–5	Moore Gymnasium (504); Daytona Beach, FL
12/29/2012*; 2:05 pm	Marygrove	W 93–52	8–5	Beeghly Center (1,379); Youngstown, OH
01/02/2013; 8:00 pm	at UIC	L 60–65	8–6 (0–1)	UIC Pavilion (1,789); Chicago, IL
01/05/2013; 4:00 pm	at Loyola–Chicago	W 68–66	9–6 (1–1)	Joseph J. Gentile Arena (2,109); Chicago, IL
01/10/2013; 7:05 pm	at Detroit	L 60–101	9–7 (1–2)	Beeghly Center (2,202); Youngstown, OH
01/17/2013; 8:00 pm, ESPN3	at Green Bay	L 58–67	9–8 (1–3)	Resch Center (2,292); Green Bay, WI
01/19/2013; 8:00 pm	at Milwaukee	W 75–72	10–8 (2–3)	Klotsche Center (2,706); Milwaukee, WI
01/23/2013; 7:05 pm	Wright State	W 68–61	11–8 (3–3)	Beeghly Center (2,288); Youngstown, OH
01/26/2013; 2:05 pm, ESPN3	Cleveland State	W 73–59	12–8 (4–3)	Beeghly Center (N/A); Youngstown, OH
01/30/2013; 7:05 pm, ESPN3	Valparaiso	W 80–68	13–8 (5–3)	Beeghly Center (2,584); Youngstown, OH
02/01/2013; 9:00 pm, ESPNU	at Detroit	L 77–88	13–9 (5–4)	Calihan Hall (2,126); Detroit, MI
02/05/2013; 7:00 pm, ESPN3	at Cleveland State	L 60–66	13–10 (5–5)	Wolstein Center (2,041); Cleveland, OH
02/07/2013; 7:45 pm	Loyola–Chicago	W 60–59	14–10 (6–5)	Beeghly Center (1,844); Youngstown, OH
02/10/2013; 2:05 pm	UIC	L 83–88 ^{3OT}	14–11 (6–6)	Beeghly Center (2,374); Youngstown, OH
02/15/2013; 7:05 pm	Milwaukee	W 94–80	15–11 (7–6)	Beeghly Center (2,817); Youngstown, OH
02/17/2013; 2:05 pm, ESPN3	Green Bay	L 54–71	15–12 (7–7)	Beeghly Center (2,860); Youngstown, OH
02/23/2013*; 7:05 pm	Central Michigan; BracketBusters	W 86–75	16–12	Beeghly Center (2,710); Youngstown, OH
02/26/2013; 8:05 pm	at Valparaiso	L 64–73	16–13 (7–8)	Athletics–Recreation Center (3,410); Valparaiso, IN
03/02/2013; 2:00 pm, HLN/ESPN3	at Wright State	L 45–72	16–14 (7–9)	Nutter Center (3,682); Fairborn, OH
Horizon League tournament
03/05/2013; 7:05 pm	Loyola–Chicago; First Round	W 62–60	17–14	Beeghly Center (2,270); Youngstown, OH
03/08/2013; 6:00 pm, ESPN3	vs. Wright State; Quarterfinals	L 59–66	17–15	Athletics–Recreation Center (1,155); Valparaiso, IN
2013 CIT
03/19/2013*; 7:05 pm	Oakland; First Round	W 99–87	18–15	Beeghly Center (3,056); Youngstown, OH
03/23/2013*; 7:05 pm	Canisius; Second Round	L 82–84 ^{OT}	18–16	Beeghly Center (2,596); Youngstown, OH
*Non-conference game. ^{#}Rankings from AP Poll. (#) Tournament seedings in parentheses. All times are in Eastern Time.
