= Hendricksville, Indiana =

- Unincorporated community
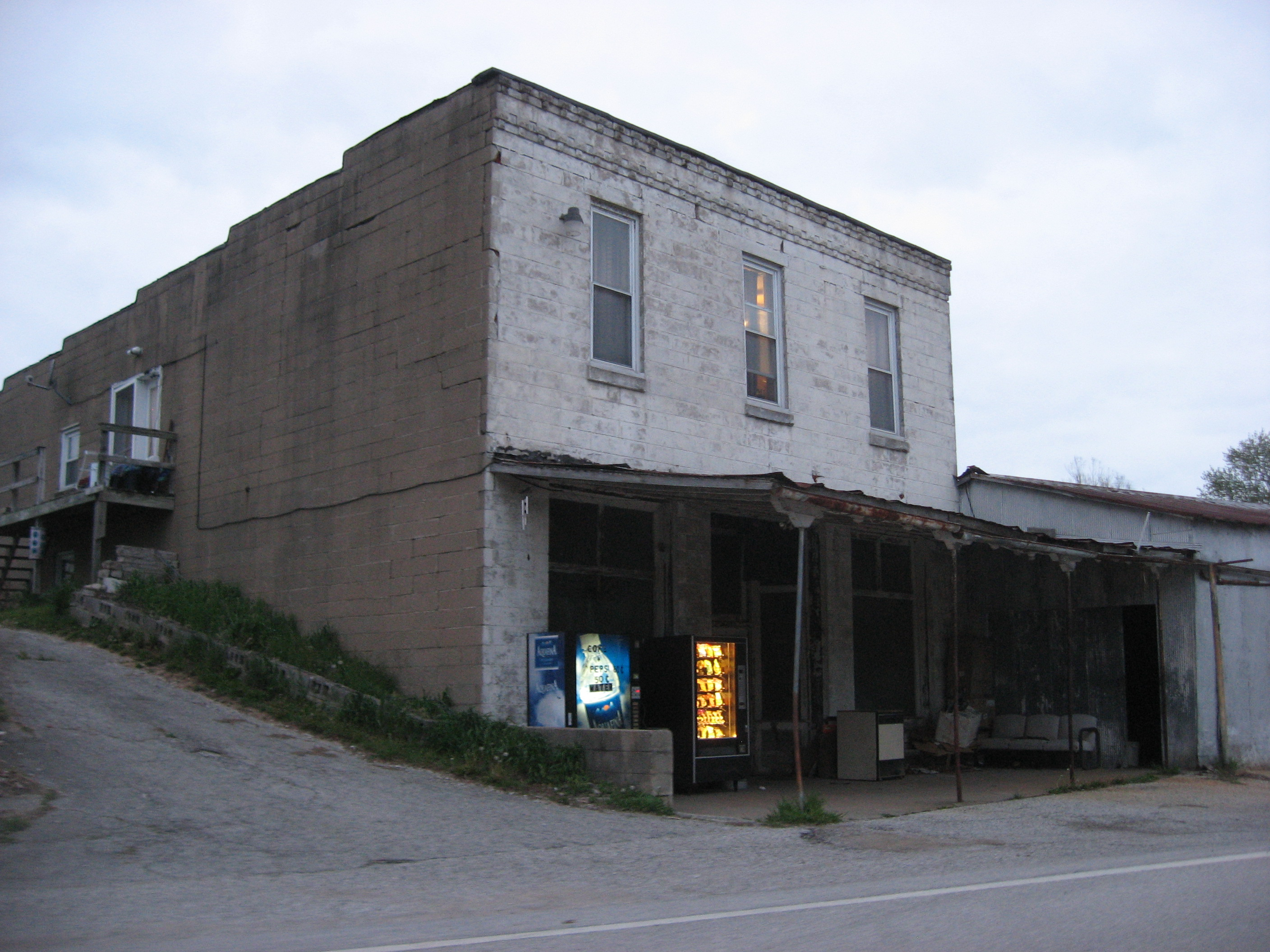
- Former post office and general store

- Location within Indiana Location within the United States
- Coordinates: 39°08′10″N 86°42′14″W
- Country: United States
- State: Indiana
- County: Greene
- Township: Beech Creek
- Elevation: 633 ft (193 m)
- ZIP code: 47459
- FIPS code: 18-33088
- GNIS feature ID: 436024

Hendricksville is an unincorporated community in Beech Creek Township, Greene County, Indiana.

== History ==
Hendricksville was likely named for Philip Hendricks, a pioneer. A post office was established at Hendricksville in 1888, and remained in operation until it was discontinued in 1921.
