= 2012–13 Cleveland State Vikings men's basketball team =

American college basketball season

2012–13 Cleveland State Vikings men's basketball
- Conference: Horizon League
- Record: 14–18 (5–11 Horizon)
- Head coach: Gary Waters
- Assistant coaches: Larry DeSimpelare; Jermaine Kimbrough; Cornelius Jackson
- Home arena: Wolstein Center

2012–13 Horizon League men's basketball standings
	Conf.				Overall
Team	W		L	PCT	W		L	PCT
Valparaiso †	13	–	3	.813	26	–	8	.765
Detroit	12	–	4	.750	20	–	13	.606
Wright State	10	–	6	.625	23	–	13	.639
Green Bay	10	–	6	.625	18	–	16	.529
UIC	7	–	9	.438	18	–	16	.529
Youngstown State	7	–	9	.438	18	–	16	.529
Loyola Chicago	5	–	11	.313	15	–	16	.484
Cleveland State	5	–	11	.313	14	–	18	.438
Milwaukee	3	–	13	.188	8	–	24	.250
† 2013 Horizon League Tournament winner As of March 27, 2013; Rankings from AP Poll

The 2012–13 Cleveland State Vikings men's basketball team represented Cleveland State University in the 2012–13 NCAA Division I men's basketball season. Their head coach was Gary Waters. The Vikings played their home games at the Wolstein Center and were members of the Horizon League. It was the 82nd season of Cleveland State basketball. They finished the season 14–18, 5–11 in Horizon League play to finish in eighth place. They lost in the first round of the Horizon League tournament to UIC.

== Roster ==
Number	Name	Position	Height	Weight	Year	Hometown
0	Josh Ivory	Guard	6–2	200	Freshman	Alexandria, Louisiana
1	Sebastian Douglas	Guard	6–4	210	Sophomore	Houston, Texas
2	Bryn Forbes	Guard	6–3	175	Freshman	Lansing, Michigan
3	Trey Lewis	Guard	6–2	180	Sophomore	Garfield Heights, Ohio
4	Devon Long	Center	6–7	260	Junior	Highland Park, Michigan
11	Junior Lomomba	Guard	6–5	185	Freshman	Montreal, Quebec, Canada
15	Anton Grady	Forward	6–8	215	Sophomore	Cleveland, Ohio
20	Raphael Veira	Forward	6–5	200	Junior	Cleveland, Ohio
21	Marlin Mason	Forward	6–6	210	Sophomore	Detroit, Michigan
24	Ludovic Ndaye	Center	6–9	240	Junior	Montreal, Quebec, Canada
31	Charlie Lee	Guard	5–9	160	Sophomore	Milwaukee, Wisconsin
32	Aaron Scales	Center	6–9	260	Freshman	High Point, North Carolina
43	Samuel Steinmiller	Guard	5–10	225	Sophomore	Cleveland, Ohio

== Schedule ==
Date time, TV	Opponent	Result	Record	Site (attendance) city, state
Exhibition
11/06/2012*; 7:00 pm	Malone	W 79–70		Wolstein Center; Cleveland, OH
Regular season
11/09/2012*; 7:30 pm	Grambling State	W 92–49	1–0	Wolstein Center (4,127); Cleveland, OH
11/12/2012*; 6:00 pm	vs. Bowling Green; NIT Season Tip-Off First Round	W 79–73 ^{OT}	2–0	Crisler Center (8,412); Ann Arbor, MI
11/13/2012*; 6:00 pm, ESPN2	at No. 5 Michigan; NIT Season Tip-Off	L 47–77	2–1	Crisler Center (8,622); Ann Arbor, MI
11/17/2012*; 2:00 pm	Old Dominion; NIT Season Tip-Off	W 67–55	3–1	Wolstein Center (1,289); Cleveland, OH
11/19/2012*; 5:00 pm	vs. Alabama–Huntsville; NIT Season Tip-Off	W 71–69	4–1	Charles L. Sewall Center (1,044); Coraopolis, PA
11/20/2012*; 7:30 pm	vs. Robert Morris; NIT Season Tip-Off	L 62–71	4–2	Charles L. Sewall Center (230); Coraopolis, PA
11/28/2012*; 7:00 pm	at Ball State	W 69–63	5–2	Worthen Arena (3,147); Muncie, IN
12/01/2012*; 2:00 pm	Toledo	W 78–73	6–2	Wolstein Center (1,549); Cleveland, OH
12/08/2012*; 1:00 pm, ESPN3	at No. 25 NC State	L 63–80	6–3	PNC Arena (7,234); Raleigh, NC
12/15/2012*; 2:00 pm	at St. Bonaventure	L 53–87	6–4	Reilly Center (3,223); St. Bonaventure, NY
12/19/2012*; 7:00 pm	Notre Dame College	W 77–66	7–4	Wolstein Center (1,169); Cleveland, OH
12/23/2012*; 2:00 pm	at Akron	L 57–87	7–5	James A. Rhodes Arena (3,240); Akron, OH
12/28/2012*; 7:00 pm	Rio Grande	W 79–59	8–5	Wolstein Center (1,107); Cleveland, OH
01/02/2013*; 6:00 pm	Kent State	L 55–72	8–6	Wolstein Center (2,847); Cleveland, OH
01/04/2013; 7:00 pm, ESPNU	at Valparaiso	L 50–74	8–7 (0–1)	Athletics–Recreation Center (3,676); Valparaiso, IN
01/07/2013; 6:00 pm	UIC	W 60–50	9–7 (1–1)	Wolstein Center (1,367); Cleveland, OH
01/09/2013; 7:00 pm	at Wright State	L 53–69	9–8 (1–2)	Nutter Center (4,048); Fairborn, OH
01/12/2013; 4:30 pm	Detroit	W 74–62	10–8 (2–2)	Wolstein Center (4,101); Cleveland, OH
01/17/2013; 8:00 pm	at Milwaukee	L 57–69	10–9 (2–3)	Klotsche Center (2,017); Milwaukee, WI
01/19/2013; 2:00 pm	at Green Bay	L 50–77	10–10 (2–4)	Resch Center (3,803); Green Bay, WI
01/23/2013; 7:00 pm	Loyola–Chicago	L 55–67	10–11 (2–5)	Wolstein Center (1,565); Cleveland, OH
01/26/2013; 2:05 pm, ESPN3	at Youngstown State	L 59–73	10–12 (2–6)	Beeghly Center (N/A); Youngstown, OH
02/02/2013; 8:00 pm	at UIC	W 77–66	11–12 (3–6)	UIC Pavilion (2,516); Chicago, IL
02/05/2013; 7:00 pm, ESPN3	Youngstown State	W 66–60	12–12 (4–6)	Wolstein Center (2,041); Cleveland, OH
02/09/2013; 4:00 pm, ESPN2	Valparaiso	L 72–80	12–13 (4–7)	Wolstein Center (2,403); Cleveland, OH
02/12/2013; 7:00 pm, ESPN3	at Detroit	L 62–92	12–14 (4–8)	Calihan Hall (2,056); Detroit, MI
02/15/2013; 9:00 pm, ESPNU	Green Bay	L 59–66	12–15 (4–9)	Wolstein Center (1,813); Cleveland, OH
02/17/2013; 2:00 pm, ESPN3	Milwaukee	W 88–67	13–15 (5–9)	Wolstein Center (2,839); Cleveland, OH
02/20/2013; 7:00 pm	Wright State	L 41–50	13–16 (5–10)	Wolstein Center (2,115); Cleveland, OH
02/23/2013*; 8:00 pm	at Western Illinois; ESPN BracketBusters	W 60–54	14–16	Western Hall (4,259); Macomb, IL
03/02/2013; 3:00 pm	Loyola–Chicago	L 60–87	14–17 (5–11)	Joseph J. Gentile Arena (2,317); Chicago, IL
Horizon League tournament
03/05/2013; 8:00 pm	at UIC; First Round	L 59–82	14–18	UIC Pavilion (948); Chicago, IL
*Non-conference game. ^{#}Rankings from AP Poll. (#) Tournament seedings in parentheses. All times are in Eastern Time..
