= Springville, Lawrence County, Indiana =

Springville, Indiana
- Unincorporated community
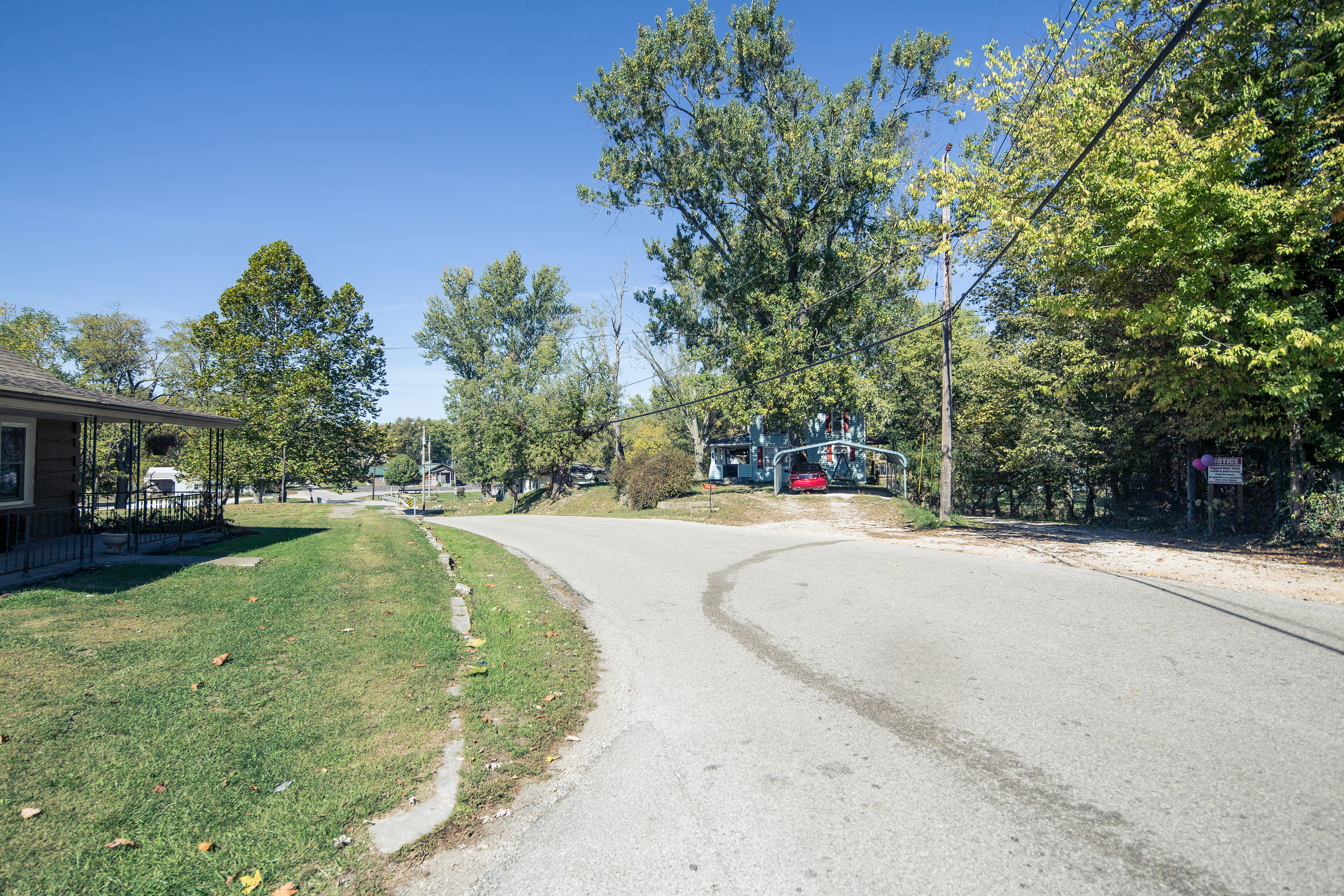

- Location within Indiana Location within the United States
- Coordinates: 38°56′10″N 86°37′10″W
- Country: United States
- State: Indiana
- County: Lawrence
- Township: Perry
- Elevation: 637 ft (194 m)
- Time zone: UTC5 (Eastern)
- ZIP code: 47462
- FIPS code: 18-72404
- GNIS feature ID: 451499

Springville is an unincorporated community in Perry Township, Lawrence County, Indiana.

== History ==
Springville was platted in 1832. It was named after Spring Creek.

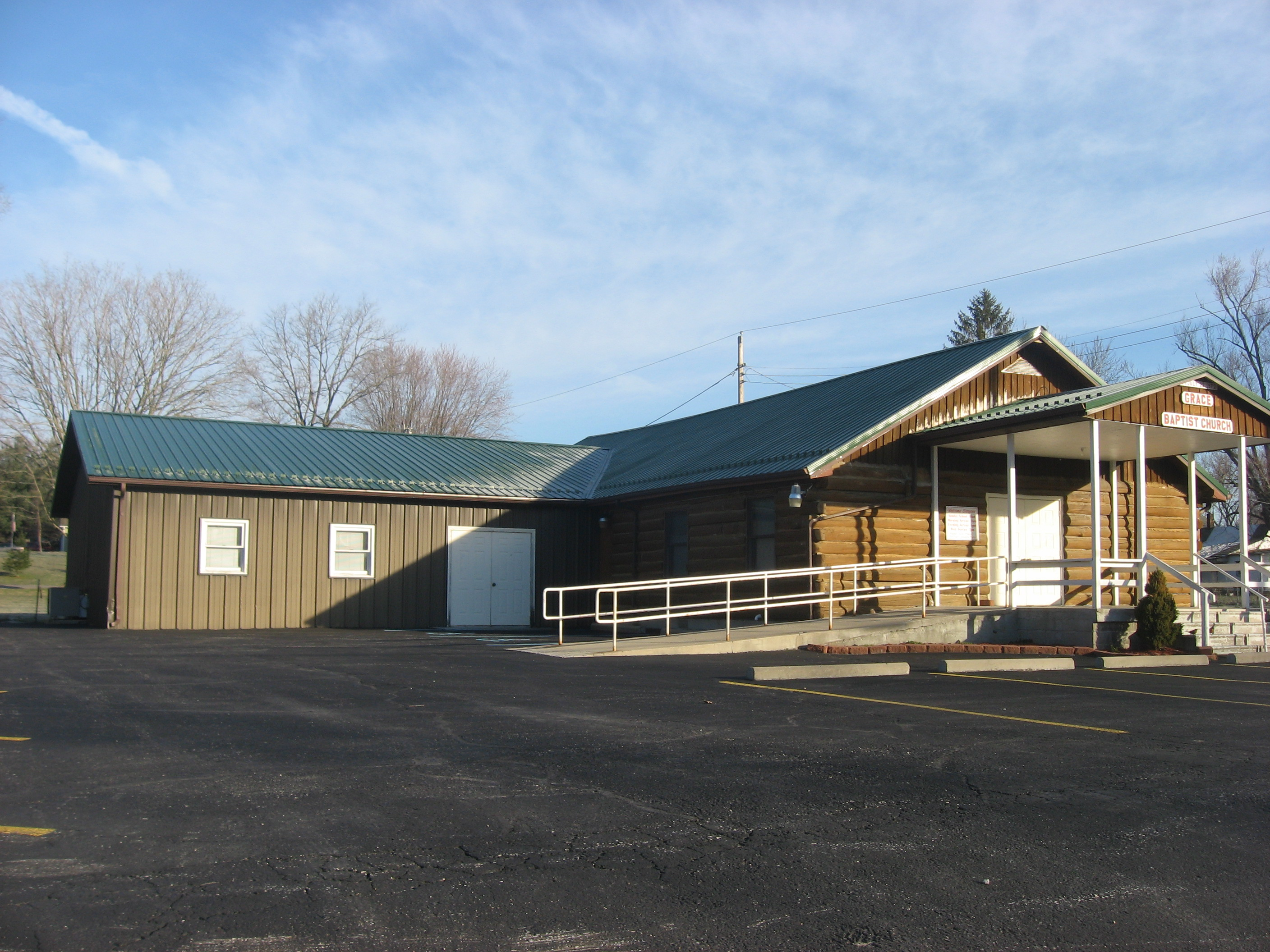
Grace Baptist Church at the center of the community
