= Solsberry, Indiana =

- Census-designated place
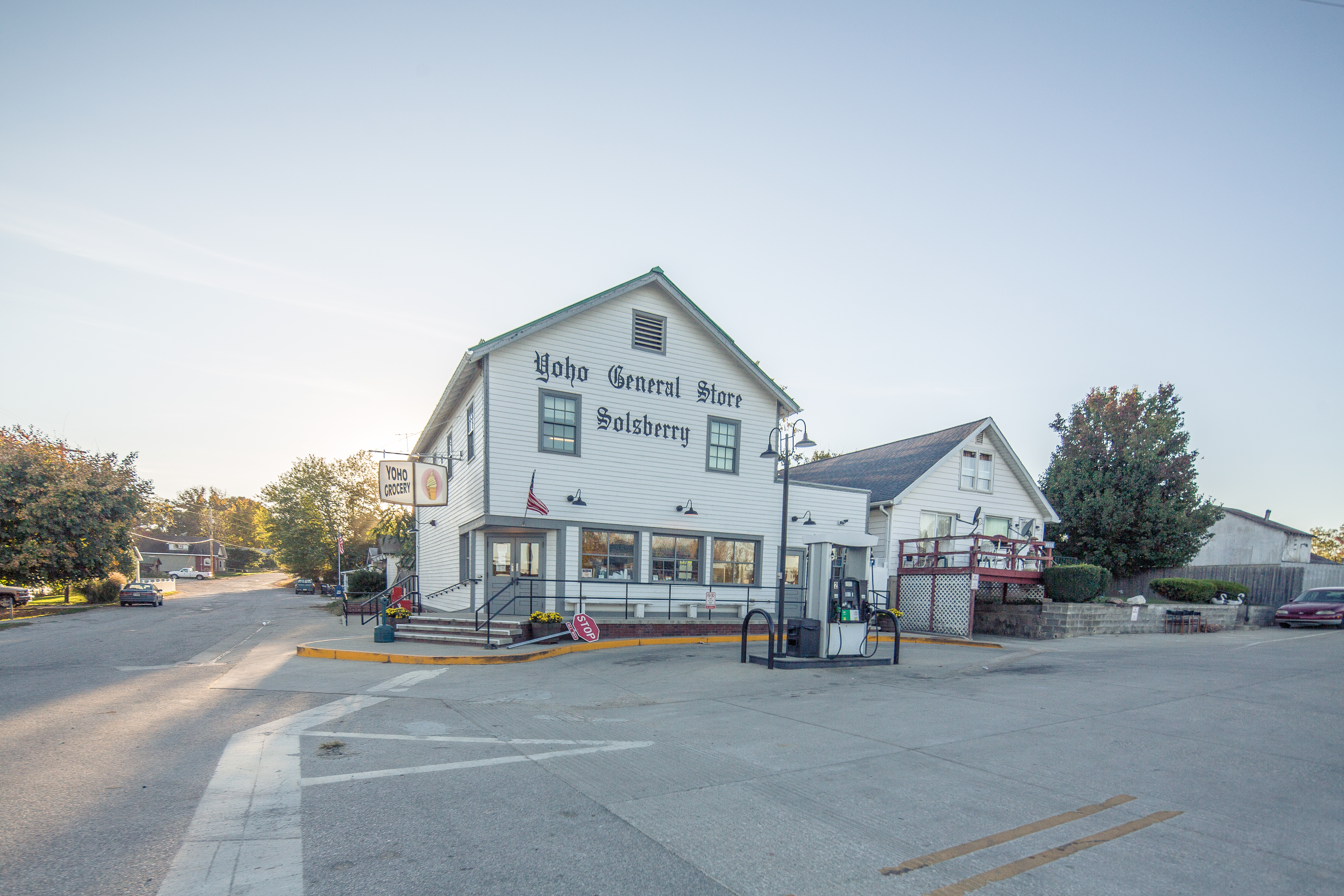

- Location within Indiana Location within the United States
- Coordinates: 39°04′52″N 86°45′32″W
- Country: United States
- State: Indiana
- County: Greene
- Township: Beech Creek
- Elevation: 778 ft (237 m)
- ZIP code: 47459
- FIPS code: 18-70506
- GNIS feature ID: 2830391

Solsberry is an unincorporated community in Beech Creek Township, Greene County, Indiana.

== History ==
According to one source, Solsberry is likely a corruption of Salisbury, a city in England. The Solsberry post office was established in 1851. However, according to locals, the name Solsberry originates from one of the early settlers to the region, Solomon Wilkerson, who planned the town and is buried in the town cemetery.

== Geography ==
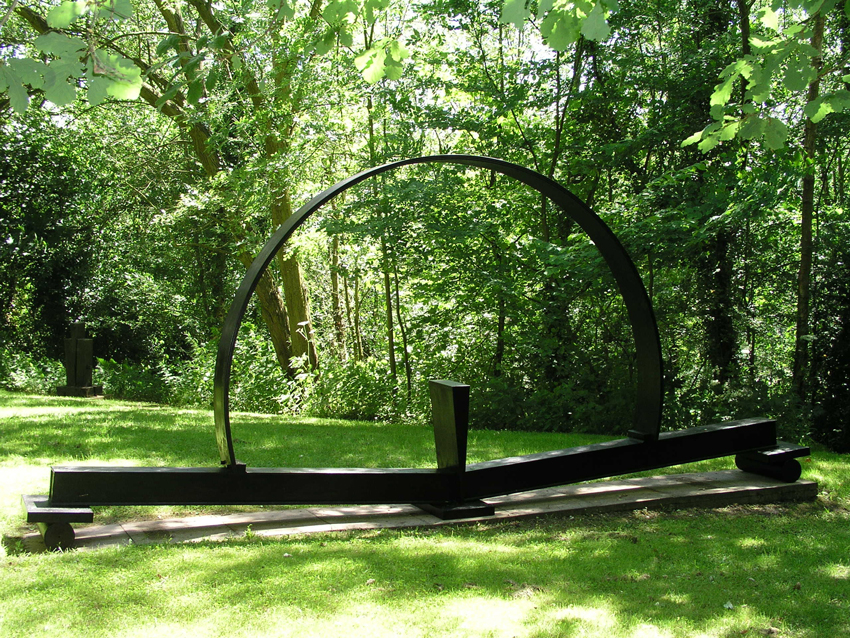
Blake by Roy Kitchin at the Solsberry Sculpture Trail

Solsberry is home to the Sculpture Trails Outdoor Museum.

== Demographics ==
Historical population
Census	Pop.	Note	%±
2023 (est.)	182

The United States Census Bureau defined Solsberry as a census designated place in the 2022 American Community Survey.
