= Cincinnati, Indiana =

Cincinnati
- Unincorporated area
- Cincinnati, Indiana
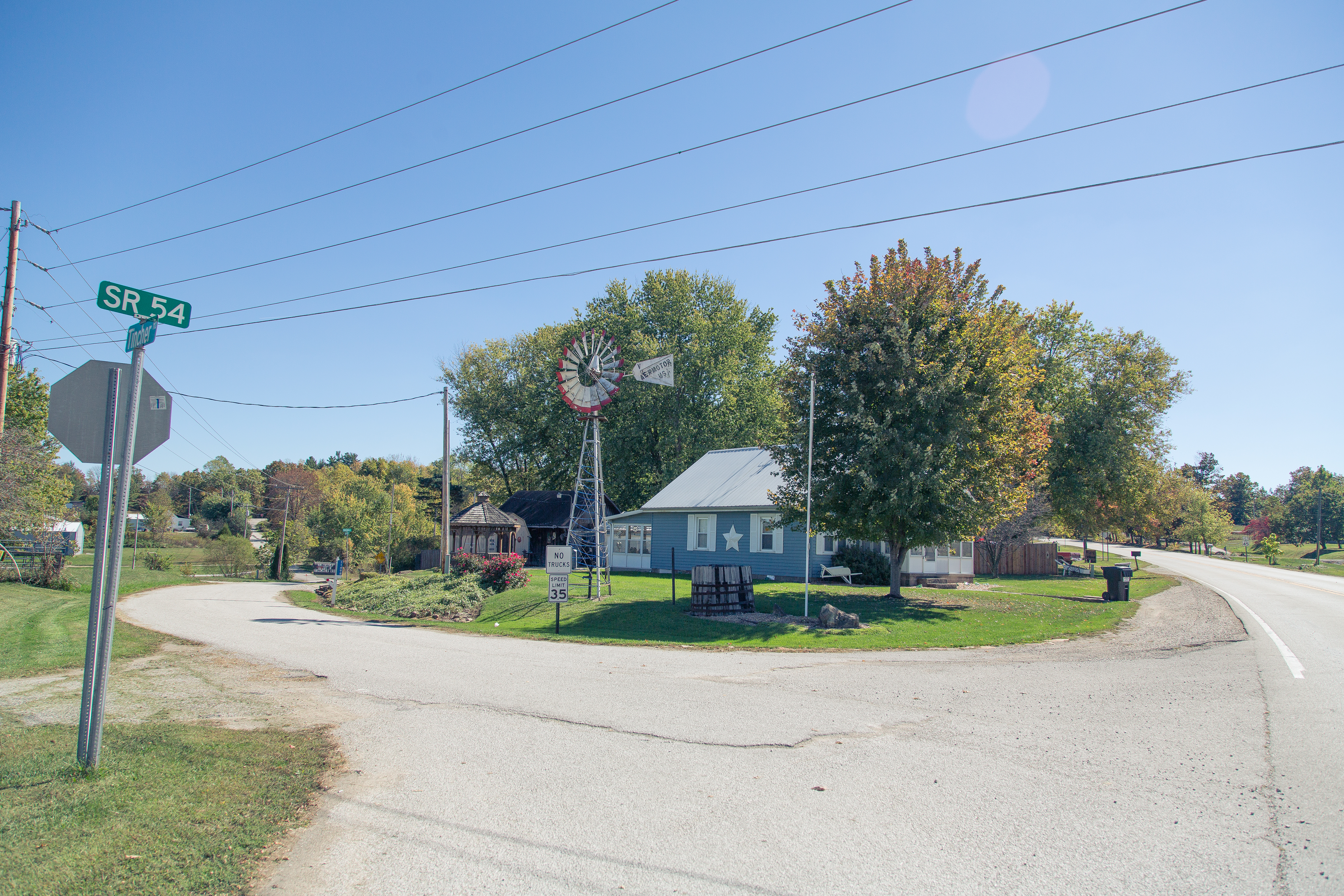

- Flag
- Nickname: Little Cincinnati
- Location within Indiana Location within the United States
- Coordinates: 39°01′12″N 86°43′44″W
- Country: United States
- State: Indiana
- County: Greene
- Township: Center
- Named for: Cincinnatus
- Elevation: 827 ft (252 m)

Population
  - Total: 3,567
- Time zone: UTC-5
  - Summer (DST): UTC-4 (EST)
- ZIP code: 47424
- Area code: 930
- FIPS code: 18-12682
- GNIS feature ID: 432522
- Website: https://cityofcincinnati.wixsite.com/cincinnati-indiana

Cincinnati, also referred to as Little Cincinnati, is an unincorporated area located in the Center Township of Greene County, Indiana, United States.

== History ==
A post office was established at Cincinnati in 1874, and remained in operation until it was discontinued in 1934. According to tradition, the community was named when a visitor told the innkeeper that the surrounding hills and whiskey made him recall his home in Cincinnati, Ohio.

== Education ==
Cincinnati has a public library, the Eastern Branch of the Bloomfield-Eastern Greene County Public Library. Eastern Greene High School is also located in Cincinnati despite having a Bloomfield address.
