= Koleen, Indiana =

- Unincorporated community
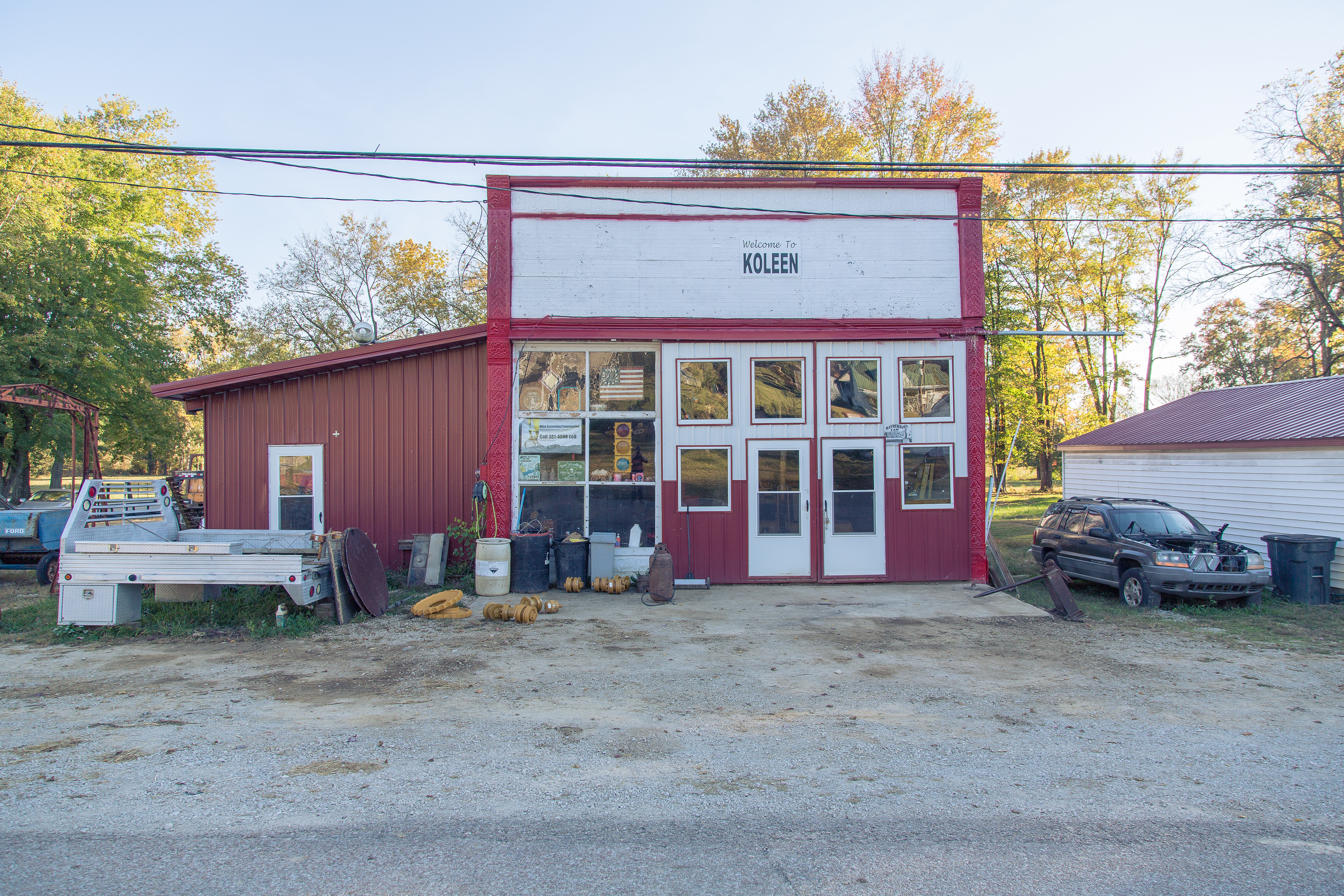

- Location within Indiana Location within the United States
- Coordinates: 38°58′17″N 86°49′44″W
- Country: United States
- State: Indiana
- County: Greene
- Township: Jackson
- Elevation: 525 ft (160 m)
- ZIP code: 47424
- FIPS code: 18-40446
- GNIS feature ID: 437432

Koleen is an unincorporated community in Jackson Township, Greene County, Indiana.

== History ==
Koleen was likely named for the valuable kaolin clay deposits in the area. The Koleen post office was established in 1877.
