= Perry Township, Lawrence County, Indiana =

Perry Township
- Township
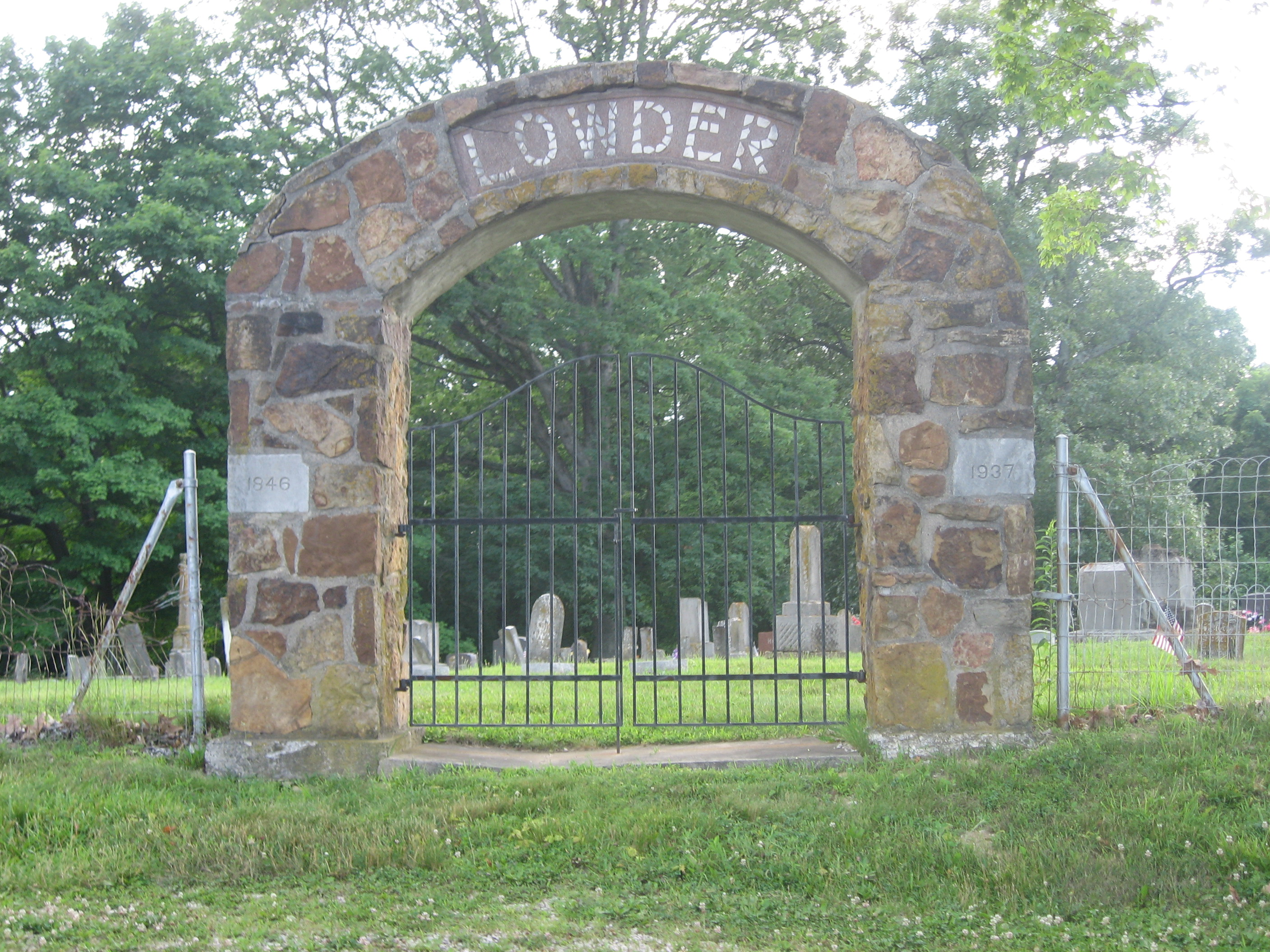
- Gate at the Lowder Cemetery, northwest of Springville

- Location in Lawrence County
- Coordinates: 38°56′58″N 86°38′12″W
- Country: United States
- State: Indiana
- County: Lawrence

Government
  - Type: Indiana township
  - Trustee: Amy Voorhies

Area
  - Total: 35.68 sq mi (92.4 km^{2})
  - Land: 35.64 sq mi (92.3 km^{2})
  - Water: 0.04 sq mi (0.10 km^{2}) 0.11%
- Elevation: 659 ft (201 m)

Population (2020)
  - Total: 2,275
  - Density: 63.7/sq mi (24.6/km^{2})
- ZIP code: 47462
- GNIS feature ID: 0453720

Perry Township is one of nine townships in Lawrence County, Indiana, United States. As of the 2010 census, its population was 2,259 and it contained 943 housing units.

== History ==
Perry Township was established in 1822. It was named for Commodore Oliver Hazard Perry.

== Geography ==
According to the 2020 census, the township has a total area of 35.68 square miles (92.4 km^{2}), of which 35.64 square miles (92.3 km^{2}) (or 99.89%) is land and 0.04 square miles (0.10 km^{2}) (or 0.11%) is water.

=== Unincorporated towns ===
- Popcorn at 38.975881°N 86.656944°W
- Red Hill at 38.933382°N 86.597775°W
- Springville at 38.93616°N 86.619442°W

(This list is based on USGS data and may include former settlements.)

=== Cemeteries ===
The township contains these fourteen cemeteries: Baptist, Byers-Rainbolt (aka Beyers-Rainbolt), Christian, Cobb, East, Graves, Gray, Lowder, Oak Grove, Quaker, Short, Slave, Springville West (aka Methodist) and Preston.

=== Major highways ===
- Indiana State Road 54
- Indiana State Road 58

== Demographics ==
Historical population
Census	Pop.	Note	%±
1890	692		—
1900	810		17.1%
1910	717		−11.5%
1920	655		−8.6%
1930	700		6.9%
1940	844		20.6%
1950	903		7.0%
1960	1,046		15.8%
1970	1,148		9.8%
1980	1,533		33.5%
1990	1,726		12.6%
2000	1,893		9.7%
2010	2,259		19.3%
2020	2,275		0.7%

== School districts ==
- North Lawrence Community Schools
- Springville Community Academy - a public charter school opened in 2022 serving Grades K - 8. It is authorized by the University of Southern Indiana.

== Political districts ==
- Indiana's 4th congressional district
- State House District 65
- State Senate District 44
