= 2012–13 Toledo Rockets men's basketball team =

American college basketball season

2012–13 Toledo Rockets men's basketball
- Conference: Mid-American Conference
- West Division
- Record: 15–13 (10–6 MAC)
- Head coach: Tod Kowalczyk (3rd season)
- Assistant coaches: Angres Thorpe; Jason Kalsow; Ryan Pedon
- Home arena: Savage Arena

2012–13 Mid-American Conference men's basketball standings
	Conf.				Overall
Team	W		L	PCT	W		L	PCT
East
Akron †	14	–	2	.875	26	–	7	.788
Ohio	14	–	2	.875	24	–	10	.706
Kent State	9	–	7	.563	21	–	14	.600
Buffalo	7	–	9	.438	14	–	20	.412
Bowling Green	7	–	9	.438	13	–	19	.406
Miami	3	–	13	.188	9	–	22	.290
West
Western Michigan	10	–	6	.625	22	–	13	.629
Toledo*	10	–	6	.625	15	–	13	.536
Ball State	8	–	8	.500	15	–	15	.500
Eastern Michigan	7	–	9	.438	16	–	18	.471
Central Michigan	4	–	12	.250	11	–	20	.355
Northern Illinois	3	–	13	.188	5	–	25	.167
† 2013 MAC tournament winner As of March 27, 2013; *Ineligible for postseason due to APR penalties Rankings from AP Poll

The 2012–13 Toledo Rockets men's basketball team represented the University of Toledo during the 2012–13 NCAA Division I men's basketball season. The Rockets, led by third-year head coach Tod Kowalczyk, played their home games at the Savage Arena and were members of the West Division of the Mid-American Conference.

Due to low APR scores, the Rockets were ineligible for post-season play, including the MAC Tournament. They finished the season 15–13, 10–6 in MAC play to finish in a tie for the West Division championship. However, due to their postseason ban, the MAC did not allow them to be division champions.

== Roster ==
Number	Name	Position	Height	Weight	Year	Hometown
0	James Ewing	Forward	6–5	230	Junior	Buffalo, New York
1	Dominique Buckley	Guard	6–2	200	Senior	Romulus, Michigan
3	AJ Mathew	Guard	6–2	175	Sophomore	Ypsilanti, Michigan
5	Rian Pearson	Guard	6–4	190	Junior	Raytown, Missouri
11	Josh Lemons	Guard	6–0	175	Freshman	Cincinnati, Ohio
15	Aubrey Williams	Forward	6–7	215	Freshman	Bowie, Maryland
20	Julius Brown	Guard	5–10	175	Sophomore	Markham, Illinois
21	DeLino Dear	Forward/Center	6–9	220	Junior	Chicago, Illinois
32	Reese Holliday	Forward	6–4	230	Junior	Kansas City, Kansas
33	Anthony Rice	Guard	6–0	160	Sophomore	Ferndale, Michigan
43	Matt Smith	Forward	6–7	225	Junior	Whitewright, Texas
53	Nathan Boothe	Center	6–9	250	Freshman	Gurnee, Illinois
55	Richard Wonnell	Center	6–9	225	Junior	Curtice, Ohio
	Justin Drummond	Guard/Forward	6–4	187	Junior	Bowie, Maryland
	J.D. Weatherspoon	Forward	6–6	215	Junior	Columbus, Ohio

== Schedule ==
Date time, TV	Opponent	Result	Record	Site (attendance) city, state
Exhibition
10/26/2012*; 7:00 pm	Northwestern Ohio	W 75–52		Savage Arena; Toledo, OH
12/18/2012*; 7:00 pm	Siena Heights	W 98–58		Savage Arena; Toledo, OH
Regular season
11/09/2012*; 8:00 pm	at Loyola–Chicago	L 50–62	0–1	Joseph J. Gentile Arena (2,187); Chicago, IL
11/12/2012*; 8:00 pm	at Minnesota; Battle 4 Atlantis	L 56-82	0-2	Williams Arena (11,028); Minneapolis, MN
11/14/2012*; 8:00 pm	at Northern Iowa; Battle 4 Atlantis	L 81–84 ^{OT}	0–3	McLeod Center (3,257); Cedar Falls, IA
11/21/2012*; 4:30 pm	vs. Samford; Battle 4 Atlantis	W 82–69	1–3	Alico Arena (1,370); Fort Myers, FL
11/22/2012*; 7:00 pm	Florida Gulf Coast; Battle 4 Atlantis	L 66–72	1–4	Alico Arena (676); Fort Myers, FL
11/28/2012*; 7:00 pm	Texas A&M–Corpus Christi	W 80–68	2–4	Savage Arena (3,689); Toledo, OH
12/01/2012*; 2:00 pm	at Cleveland State	L 73–78	2–5	Wolstein Center (1,549); Cleveland, OH
12/05/2012*; 7:00 pm	at Detroit	L 73–79	2–6	Calihan Hall (1,552); Detroit, MI
12/08/2012*; 7:00 pm	at Eastern Illinois	W 67–59	3–6	Lantz Arena (963); Charleston, IL
12/29/2012*; 2:00 pm	UIC	W 74–55	4–6	Savage Arena (3,617); Toledo, OH
12/31/2012*; 1:00 pm	Chicago State	L 53–58	4–7	Savage Arena (3,606); Toledo, OH
01/09/2013; 7:00 pm	at Kent State	W 70–58	5–7 (1–0)	M.A.C. Center (2,178); Kent, OH
01/12/2013; 7:00 pm	Central Michigan	W 76–72 ^{OT}	6–7 (2–0)	Savage Arena (4,426); Toledo, OH
01/16/2013; 7:00 pm	at Western Michigan	L 56–79	6–8 (2–1)	University Arena (2,544); Kalamazoo, MI
01/19/2013; 6:00 pm, STO/ESPN3	at Ohio	L 67–76	6–9 (2–2)	Convocation Center (7,388); Athens, OH
01/23/2013; 7:00 pm, STO/ESPN3	Akron	L 56–71	6–10 (2–3)	Savage Arena (3,921); Toledo, OH
01/26/2013; 7:00 pm	Bowling Green	W 75–62	7–10 (3–3)	Savage Arena (6,361); Toledo, OH
01/30/2013; 7:00 pm	at Ball State	W 85–78	8–10 (4–3)	John E. Worthen Arena (3,219); Muncie, IN
02/02/2013; 4:00 pm	at Northern Illinois	W 69–64	9–10 (5–3)	Convocation Center (1,382); DeKalb, IL
02/06/2013; 7:00 pm	Miami (OH)	W 65–64	10–10 (6–3)	Savage Arena (3,711); Toledo, OH
02/09/2013; 7:00 pm	Eastern Michigan	W 60–52	11–10 (7–3)	Savage Arena (4,252); Toledo, OH
02/13/2013; 7:00 pm	at Buffalo	L 60–75	11–11 (7–4)	Alumni Arena (2,338); Amherst, NY
02/16/2013; 7:00 pm	at Central Michigan	W 73–64	12–11 (8–4)	McGuirk Arena (1,574); Mount Pleasant, MI
02/23/2013*; 2:00 pm	McNeese State; BracketBusters	W 79–66	13–11	Savage Arena (4,393); Toledo, OH
02/27/2013; 7:00 pm	Western Michigan	L 62–65	13–12 (8–5)	Savage Arena (3,982); Toledo, OH
03/02/2013; 2:00 pm	Ball State	L 72–86	13–13 (8–6)	Savage Arena (3,904); Toledo, OH
03/05/2013; 7:00 pm	Northern Illinois	W 70–46	14–13 (9–6)	Savage Arena (3,603); Toledo, OH
03/09/2013; 12:00 pm	at Eastern Michigan	W 78–67	15–13 (10–6)	Eastern Michigan University Convocation Center (892); Ypsilanti, MI
*Non-conference game. ^{#}Rankings from AP Poll. (#) Tournament seedings in parentheses. All times are in Eastern Time.
