= 2012–13 Western Michigan Broncos men's basketball team =

American college basketball season

2012–13 Western Michigan Broncos men's basketball

USF Invitational champions MAC West Division champions

College Basketball Invitational, Semifinals
- Conference: Mid-American Conference
- West Division
- Record: 22–13 (10–6 MAC)
- Head coach: Steve Hawkins (10th season)
- Assistant coaches: Clayton Bates; James Holland; David Kool
- Home arena: University Arena

2012–13 Mid-American Conference men's basketball standings
	Conf.				Overall
Team	W		L	PCT	W		L	PCT
East
Akron †	14	–	2	.875	26	–	7	.788
Ohio	14	–	2	.875	24	–	10	.706
Kent State	9	–	7	.563	21	–	14	.600
Buffalo	7	–	9	.438	14	–	20	.412
Bowling Green	7	–	9	.438	13	–	19	.406
Miami	3	–	13	.188	9	–	22	.290
West
Western Michigan	10	–	6	.625	22	–	13	.629
Toledo*	10	–	6	.625	15	–	13	.536
Ball State	8	–	8	.500	15	–	15	.500
Eastern Michigan	7	–	9	.438	16	–	18	.471
Central Michigan	4	–	12	.250	11	–	20	.355
Northern Illinois	3	–	13	.188	5	–	25	.167
† 2013 MAC tournament winner As of March 27, 2013; *Ineligible for postseason due to APR penalties Rankings from AP Poll

The 2012–13 Western Michigan Broncos men's basketball team represented Western Michigan University during the 2012–13 NCAA Division I men's basketball season. The Broncos, led by tenth year head coach Steve Hawkins, played their home games at the University Arena and were members of the West Division of the Mid-American Conference. They finished the season 22–13, 10–6 in MAC play to be champions of the West Division. They advanced to the semifinals of the MAC tournament where they lost to Ohio. They were invited to the 2013 College Basketball Invitational where they defeated North Dakota State and Wyoming to advance to the semifinals where they lost to George Mason.

== Roster ==
Number	Name	Position	Height	Weight	Year	Hometown
0	Von Washington	Guard	6′ 0″	175	Freshman	Kalamazoo, Michigan
2	Connar Tava	Guard/Forward	6′ 5″	230	Freshman	Macomb, Michigan
3	Hayden Hoerdemann	Guard	6′ 3″	185	Sophomore	Bloomington, Illinois
4	Jared Klein	Guard	6′ 1″	180	Freshman	Otsego, Michigan
10	Brandon Pokley	Guard	6′ 4″	182	Senior	Clarkston, Michigan
11	Nate Hutcheson	Forward	6′ 7″	210	Senior	Marion, Iowa
20	Tim Brennan	Guard/Forward	6′ 5″	186	Sophomore	Chicago, Illinois
21	Shayne Whittington	Center	6′ 10″	220	Junior	Paw Paw, Michigan
22	Austin Richie	Guard	6′ 2″	160	Sophomore	Lowell, Indiana
24	Darius Paul	Forward	6′ 8″	220	Freshman	Gurnee, Illinois
25	David Brown	Guard	6′ 3″	208	Junior	Roscoe, Illinois
32	Taylor Perry	Guard	6′ 4″	195	Freshman	Rochester, Michigan
34	A. J. Avery	Forward	6′ 6″	185	Freshman	Chicago, Illinois
35	Charles Harris	Guard/Forward	6′ 3″	180	Freshman	Antioch, Illinois
40	Kellen McCormick	Forward	6′ 8″	200	Freshman	West Bloomfield, Michigan
42	Dan Loney	Forward	6′ 4″	208	Senior	Benzonia, Michigan
52	Nick Stapert	Center	6′ 8″	237	Junior	Gobles, Michigan

== Schedule ==
Date time, TV	Opponent	Result	Record	Site (attendance) city, state
Exhibition
November 1, 2012*; 2:00 pm	Kalamazoo College	W 93–50		University Arena (1,927); Kalamazoo, MI
November 3, 2012*; 2:00 pm	Roosevelt University	W 81–60		University Arena (1,777); Kalamazoo, MI
Regular season
November 10, 2012*; 12:00 pm	at Cornell	L 55–63	0–1	Newman Arena (N/A); Ithaca, NY
November 13, 2012*; 7:00 pm	Marygrove	W 85–40	1–1	University Arena (1,896); Kalamazoo, MI
November 16, 2012*; 5:00 pm	vs. Loyola–Chicago; USF Invitational	W 81–71	2–1	USF Sun Dome (3,931); Tampa, FL
November 17, 2012*; 5:00 pm	vs. Maryland–Eastern Shore; USF Invitational	W 68–51	3–1	USF Sun Dome (4,014); Tampa, FL
November 18, 2012*; 3:00 pm, Big East Network	at South Florida; USF Invitational	W 58–53	4–1	USF Sun Dome (3,612); Tampa, FL
November 29, 2012*; 7:00 pm	High Point	W 54–53	5–1	University Arena (2,238); Kalamazoo, MI
December 1, 2012*; 2:00 pm	Oakland	W 76–72	6–1	University Arena (3,152); Kalamazoo, MI
December 4, 2012*; 8:30 pm, BTN	at No. 3 Michigan	L 41–73	6–2	Crisler Center (12,693); Ann Arbor, MI
December 8, 2012*; 8:00 pm, ESPN3	at Illinois State	L 63–85	6–3	Redbird Arena (6,269); Normal, IL
December 16, 2012*; 3:00 pm	at High Point	W 70–64	7–3	Millis Center (1,104); High Point, NC
December 19, 2012*; 7:00 pm, NBCSN	at Duquesne	L 66–71	7–4	A. J. Palumbo Center (2,839); Pittsburgh, PA
December 22, 2012*; 2:00 pm	Mount St. Mary's	W 87–66	8–4	University Arena (3,114); Kalamazoo, MI
December 29, 2012*; 12:00 pm, ESPNU	at No. 23 NC State	L 68–84	8–5	PNC Arena (12,576); Raleigh, NC
January 9, 2013; 7:00 pm	at Akron	L 43–65	8–6 (0–1)	James A. Rhodes Arena (2,565); Akron, OH
January 12, 2013; 2:00 pm	Ohio	L 59–61	8–7 (0–2)	University Arena (3,229); Kalamazoo, MI
January 16, 2013; 7:00 pm	Toledo	W 79–56	9–7 (1–2)	University Arena (2,544); Kalamazoo, MI
January 19, 2013; 8:00 pm	at Northern Illinois	W 71–34	10–7 (2–2)	Convocation Center (997); DeKalb, IL
January 23, 2013; 7:00 pm	Eastern Michigan; Michigan MAC Trophy	W 63–59	11–7 (3–2)	University Arena (2,419); Kalamazoo, MI
January 26, 2013; 7:00 pm	at Central Michigan; Michigan MAC Trophy	W 76–59	12–7 (4–2)	McGuirk Arena (3,419); Mount Pleasant, MI
January 30, 2013; 7:00 pm	at Miami (OH)	W 72–68	13–7 (5–2)	Millett Hall (1,206); Oxford, OH
February 2, 2013; 7:00 pm	Buffalo	W 71–60	14–7 (6–2)	University Arena (3,312); Kalamazoo, MI
February 6, 2013; 7:00 pm	Kent State	W 82–76	15–7 (7–2)	University Arena (2,721); Kalamazoo, MI
February 9, 2013; 6:00 pm, STO/ESPN3	at Ball State	L 62–65	15–8 (7–3)	John E. Worthen Arena (3,458); Muncie, IN
February 13, 2013; 7:00 pm	Bowling Green	L 60–70	15–9 (7–4)	Stroh Center (1,579); Bowling Green, OH
February 16, 2013; 6:00 pm, STO/ESPN3	Northern Illinois	W 66–58	16–9 (8–4)	University Arena (3,569); Kalamazoo, MI
February 23, 2013*; 1:00 pm, ESPN3	Pacific; BracketBusters	W 67–62	17–9	University Arena (3,172); Kalamazoo, MI
February 27, 2013; 7:00 pm	at Toledo	W 65–62	18–9 (9–4)	Savage Arena (3,982); Toledo, OH
March 2, 2013; 2:00 pm	at Eastern Michigan; Michigan MAC Trophy	L 49–50 ^{OT}	18–10 (9–5)	Convocation Center (1,216); Ypsilanti, MI
March 5, 2013; 7:00 pm	Ball State	L 85–89	18–11 (9–6)	University Arena (2,539); Kalamazoo, MI
March 9, 2013; 12:00 pm, STO/ESPN3	Central Michigan; Michigan MAC Trophy	W 71–68	19–11 (10–6)	University Arena (3,303); Kalamazoo, MI
2013 MAC tournament
March 14, 2013; 9:00 pm, STO/ESPN3	vs. Eastern Michigan; Quarterfinals	W 70–55	20–11	Quicken Loans Arena (3,361); Cleveland, OH
March 15, 2013; 9:00 pm, STO/ESPN3	vs. Ohio; Semifinals	L 63–74	20–12	Quicken Loans Arena (10,324); Cleveland, OH
2013 College Basketball Invitational
March 20, 2013*; 7:00 pm	North Dakota State; First round	W 72–71 ^{OT}	21–12	University Arena (1,358); Kalamazoo, MI
March 25, 2013*; 9:00 pm, AXS TV	at Wyoming; Quarterfinals	W 75–67 ^{OT}	22–12	Arena-Auditorium (2,544); Laramie, WY
March 27, 2013*; 7:00 pm, AXS TV	at George Mason; Semifinals	L 52–62	22–13	Patriot Center (1,684); Fairfax, VA
*Non-conference game. ^{#}Rankings from AP Poll. (#) Tournament seedings in parentheses. All times are in Eastern Time.
