= 2012–13 Northern Illinois Huskies men's basketball team =

American college basketball season

2012–13 Northern Illinois Huskies men's basketball
- Conference: Mid-American Conference
- West Division
- Record: 5–25 (3–13 MAC)
- Head coach: Mark Montgomery (2nd season)
- Assistant coaches: Jon Borovich; Todd Townsend; Lou Dawkins
- Home arena: Convocation Center

2012–13 Mid-American Conference men's basketball standings
	Conf.				Overall
Team	W		L	PCT	W		L	PCT
East
Akron †	14	–	2	.875	26	–	7	.788
Ohio	14	–	2	.875	24	–	10	.706
Kent State	9	–	7	.563	21	–	14	.600
Buffalo	7	–	9	.438	14	–	20	.412
Bowling Green	7	–	9	.438	13	–	19	.406
Miami	3	–	13	.188	9	–	22	.290
West
Western Michigan	10	–	6	.625	22	–	13	.629
Toledo*	10	–	6	.625	15	–	13	.536
Ball State	8	–	8	.500	15	–	15	.500
Eastern Michigan	7	–	9	.438	16	–	18	.471
Central Michigan	4	–	12	.250	11	–	20	.355
Northern Illinois	3	–	13	.188	5	–	25	.167
† 2013 MAC tournament winner As of March 27, 2013; *Ineligible for postseason due to APR penalties Rankings from AP Poll

The 2012–13 Northern Illinois Huskies men's basketball team represented Northern Illinois University during the 2012–13 NCAA Division I men's basketball season. The Huskies, led by second year head coach Mark Montgomery, played their home games at the Convocation Center and were members of the West Division of the Mid-American Conference. They finished the season 5–25, 3–13 in MAC play to finish in last place in the West Division. They lost in the first round of the MAC tournament to Eastern Michigan.

== Class of 2012 Signees ==
College recruiting information
Name	Hometown	School	Height	Weight	Commit date
Sam Mader; PF	Appleton, Wisconsin	Appleton East	6 ft 9 in (2.06 m)	220 lb (100 kg)	
Sam Mader; PF	Recruit ratings: Scout: Rivals: (85)				
Darrell Bowie; SF	Milwaukee, Wisconsin	La Jolla Prep	6 ft 6 in (1.98 m)	200 lb (91 kg)	
Darrell Bowie; SF	Recruit ratings: Scout: Rivals: (83)				
Mike Davis; SG	Garfield Heights, Ohio	Garfield Heights	6 ft 2 in (1.88 m)	185 lb (84 kg)	
Mike Davis; SG	Recruit ratings: Scout: Rivals: (82)				
Akeem Springs; SG	Waukegan, Illinois	Waukegan	6 ft 3 in (1.91 m)	195 lb (88 kg)	
Akeem Springs; SG	Recruit ratings: Scout: Rivals: (80)				
Overall recruit ranking:
Note: In many cases, Scout, Rivals, 247Sports, On3, and ESPN may conflict in their listings of height and weight.; In these cases, the average was taken. ESPN grades are on a 100-point scale.; Sources: "ESPN". ESPN.; "2012 Team Ranking". Rivals.

== Roster ==
2012–13 Northern Illinois Huskies men's basketball team
Players
Coaches

Pos.	#	Name	Height	Weight	Year	Previous school	Hometown
C	0	Pete Rakocevic (I)	6 ft 11 in (2.11 m)	225 lb (102 kg)	Jr	Wilbraham & Monson Prep/Sacramento State	Chicago, Illinois
G	3	Antone Christian	6 ft 2 in (1.88 m)	200 lb (91 kg)	RS Jr	Martin Luther King Magnet	Nashville, Tennessee
F	4	Brandon Hayes	6 ft 4 in (1.93 m)	200 lb (91 kg)	Sr	Homewood-Flossmoor/Parkland College	Homewood, Illinois
G	5	Travon Baket	5 ft 10 in (1.78 m)	155 lb (70 kg)	Fr	Detroit Consortium	Detroit, Michigan
G/F	10	Darrell Bowie	6 ft 6 in (1.98 m)	215 lb (98 kg)	Fr	La Jolla Prep	Milwaukee, Wisconsin
G	11	Daveon Balls	6 ft 0 in (1.83 m)	165 lb (75 kg)	Fr	Lawrence North	Indianapolis, Indiana
F	13	Kevin Gray	6 ft 8 in (2.03 m)	225 lb (102 kg)	So	Brooks Academy	Chicago, Illinois
F	14	Sam Mader (redshirt)	6 ft 9 in (2.06 m)	220 lb (100 kg)	Fr	Appleton East	Appleton, Wisconsin
G	15	J.J. Cravatta	6 ft 1 in (1.85 m)	180 lb (82 kg)	Fr	Streator Township	Streator, Illinois
F	21	Keith Gray	6 ft 8 in (2.03 m)	225 lb (102 kg)	So	Brooks Academy	Chicago, Illinois
G/F	23	Abdel Nader	6 ft 7 in (2.01 m)	225 lb (102 kg)	So	Niles North	Skokie, Illinois
G	24	Mike Davis	6 ft 2 in (1.88 m)	200 lb (91 kg)	Fr	Garfield Heights	Cleveland, Ohio
G	25	Tony Nixon	6 ft 4 in (1.93 m)	207 lb (94 kg)	Sr	Seton Academy	Chicago, Illinois
G/F	32	Aksel Bolin	6 ft 7 in (2.01 m)	220 lb (100 kg)	Jr	Asker	Asker, Norway

Head coach

- Mark Montgomery

Assistant coach(es)

- Jon Borovich
- Todd Townsend
- Lou Dawkins

Legend

- (C) Team captain
- (S) Suspended
- (I) Ineligible
- (W) Walk-on
- Injured
- Current redshirt

Roster
Last update: March 31, 2013

== Schedule ==
Date time, TV	Opponent	Result	Record	Site (attendance) city, state
Exhibition
11/03/2012*; 7:00 pm	Aurora	W 89–56		Convocation Center (1,005); DeKalb, IL
Regular season
11/09/2012*; 8:00 pm	at Nebraska-Omaha	L 64–77	0–1	Ralston Arena (2,224); Ralston, NE
11/13/2012*; 7:00 am, ESPN	at Valparaiso; ESPN College Hoops Tip-off Marathon	L 46–69	0–2	Athletics–Recreation Center (2,445); Valparaiso, IN
11/18/2012*; 4:00 pm	Judson	W 72–54	1–2	Convocation Center (626); DeKalb, IL
11/24/2012*; 3:00 pm	Loyola–Chicago	L 46–53	1–3	Convocation Center (995); DeKalb, IL
11/27/2012*; 7:00 pm	UIC	L 46–58	1–4	Convocation Center (947); DeKalb, IL
12/01/2012*; 8:00 pm	at Dayton	L 43–60	1–5	University of Dayton Arena (12,637); Dayton, OH
12/05/2012*; 7:00 pm	SIU Edwardsville	W 65–54	2–5	Convocation Center (2,750); DeKalb, IL
12/07/2012*; 7:00 pm	at Milwaukee	L 73–80 ^{OT}	2–6	Klotsche Center (2,034); Milwaukee, WI
12/16/2012*; 4:00 pm	at DePaul	L 64–69	2–7	Allstate Arena (7,155); Rosemont, IL
12/19/2012*; 9:00 pm	at Seattle	L 48–75	2–8	KeyArena (2,362); Seattle, WA
12/22/2012*; 6:00 pm, Pac-12 Network	at Washington	L 57–67	2–9	Alaska Airlines Arena (7,805); Seattle, WA
12/29/2012*; 3:00 pm	at Massachusetts	L 59–64	2–10	William D. Mullins Memorial Center (1,100); Amherst, MA
01/09/2013; 6:00 pm	at Miami (OH)	W 72–61	3–10 (1–0)	Millett Hall (907); Oxford, OH
01/12/2013; 3:00 pm	Akron	L 53–68	3–11 (1–1)	Convocation Center (977); DeKalb, IL
01/16/2013; 6:00 pm	at Ohio	L 63–81	3–12 (1–2)	Convocation Center (7,648); Athens, OH
01/19/2013; 7:00 pm	Western Michigan	L 34–71	3–13 (1–3)	Convocation Center (997); DeKalb, IL
01/23/2013; 6:00 pm	at Central Michigan	W 74–61	4–13 (2–3)	McGuirk Arena (1,347); Mount Pleasant, MI
01/26/2013; 1:00 pm	at Eastern Michigan	L 25–42	4–14 (2–4)	Eastern Michigan University Convocation Center (888); Ypsilanti, MI
01/30/2013; 7:00 pm	Kent State	W 67–65	5–14 (3–4)	Convocation Center (719); DeKalb, IL
02/02/2013; 3:00 pm	Toledo	L 64–69	5–15 (3–5)	Convocation Center (1,382); DeKalb, IL
02/06/2013; 7:00 pm	Bowling Green	L 41–57	5–16 (3–6)	Convocation Center (708); DeKalb, IL
02/09/2013; 12:00 pm	at Buffalo	L 54–59	5–17 (3–7)	Alumni Arena (4,136); Amherst, NY
02/13/2013; 7:00 pm	Ball State	L 52–56	5–18 (3–8)	Convocation Center (864); DeKalb, IL
02/16/2013; 5:00 pm, STO/ESPN3	at Western Michigan	L 58–66	5–19 (3–9)	University Arena (3,569); Kalamazoo, MI
02/23/2013*; 3:00 pm	Eastern Illinois; BracketBusters	L 47–59	5–20	Convocation Center (1,009); DeKalb, IL
02/27/2013; 7:00 pm	Eastern Michigan	L 41–53	5–21 (3–10)	Convocation Center (826); DeKalb, IL
03/02/2013; 7:00 pm	Central Michigan	L 50–69	5–22 (3–11)	Convocation Center (1,324); DeKalb, IL
03/05/2013; 6:00 pm	at Toledo	L 46–70	5–23 (3–12)	Savage Arena (3,603); Toledo, OH
03/09/2013; 1:00 pm	at Ball State	L 51–53	5–24 (3–13)	John E. Worthen Arena (3,237); Muncie, IN
2013 MAC men's basketball tournament
03/11/2013; 6:00 pm	Eastern Michigan; First Round	L 44–45	5–25	Convocation Center (302); Ypsilanti, MI
*Non-conference game. ^{#}Rankings from AP Poll. (#) Tournament seedings in parentheses. All times are in Central Time.

== NCAA Record ==
The Huskies set an NCAA Division I record during the shot-clock era on December 1, 2012 against the Dayton Flyers scoring five points in the first half.

This record was broken against the Eastern Michigan Eagles on January 26. 2013, where the Huskies scored four points in the first half. The Huskies had a 3.2% field goal shooting in the first half which also set a record, breaking Savannah State's 4.3% shooting percentage against Kansas State in 2008.
