= 2012–13 Ball State Cardinals men's basketball team =

American college basketball season

2012–13 Ball State Cardinals men's basketball
- Conference: Mid-American Conference
- West Division
- Record: 15–15 (8–8 MAC)
- Head coach: Billy Taylor (6th season)
- Assistant coaches: Bob Simmonds; Mitch Gilfillan; Jay Newberry
- Home arena: John E. Worthen Arena

2012–13 Mid-American Conference men's basketball standings
	Conf.				Overall
Team	W		L	PCT	W		L	PCT
East
Akron †	14	–	2	.875	26	–	7	.788
Ohio	14	–	2	.875	24	–	10	.706
Kent State	9	–	7	.563	21	–	14	.600
Buffalo	7	–	9	.438	14	–	20	.412
Bowling Green	7	–	9	.438	13	–	19	.406
Miami	3	–	13	.188	9	–	22	.290
West
Western Michigan	10	–	6	.625	22	–	13	.629
Toledo*	10	–	6	.625	15	–	13	.536
Ball State	8	–	8	.500	15	–	15	.500
Eastern Michigan	7	–	9	.438	16	–	18	.471
Central Michigan	4	–	12	.250	11	–	20	.355
Northern Illinois	3	–	13	.188	5	–	25	.167
† 2013 MAC tournament winner As of March 27, 2013; *Ineligible for postseason due to APR penalties Rankings from AP Poll

The 2012–13 Ball State Cardinals men's basketball team represented Ball State University during the 2012–13 NCAA Division I men's basketball season. The Cardinals, led by sixth year head coach Billy Taylor, played their home games at the John E. Worthen Arena and were members of the West Division of the Mid-American Conference.

They finished the season 15–15, 8–8 in MAC play to finish in third place in the West Division. They lost in the second round of the MAC tournament to Buffalo.

Following the season, head coach Billy Taylor was fired after a record of 84–99 in six seasons.

== Roster ==
Number	Name	Position	Height	Weight	Year	Hometown
2	Matt Kamieniecki	Forward	6–8	238	Junior	Clarkston, Michigan
3	Marcus Posley	Guard	6–0	201	Freshman	Rockford, Illinois
4	Jauwan Scaife	Guard	6–2	204	Senior	Muncie, Indiana
5	Rocco Belcaster	Forward	6–7	201	Freshman	Berwyn, Illinois
12	Bo Calhoun	Forward	6–5	228	Freshman	South Bend, Indiana
13	George Cater	Guard	5–10	160	Freshman	St. Peters, Missouri
14	Chase Brogna	Guard	5–11	181	Freshman	Houston, Texas
20	Chris Bond	Forward	6–4	195	Junior	Gary, Indiana
32	Jesse Berry	Guard	6–2	192	Junior	Lafayette, Indiana
34	Tyler Koch	Forward	6–6	229	Senior	Winchester, Indiana
44	Mading Thok	Center	6–11	200	Freshman	Boyden, Iowa
50	Zach Fields	Center	6–10	269	Senior	North Vernon, Indiana
55	Majok Majok	Forward	6–8	245	Junior	Perth, Australia
	Kinder Crowder	Guard	6–2	170	Junior	Chicago, Illinois
	Kameran Madison	Guard	5–9	185	Junior	Gary, Indiana

== Schedule ==
Date time, TV	Opponent	Result	Record	Site (attendance) city, state
Regular season
11/11/2012*; 2:00 pm	Grambling State	W 78–51	1–0	John E. Worthen Arena (3,141); Muncie, IN
11/16/2012*; 7:00 pm	Wofford	W 66–61	2–0	John E. Worthen Arena (3,418); Muncie, IN
11/20/2012*; 7:00 pm	Indiana State	L 48–68	2–1	John E. Worthen Arena (3,128); Muncie, IN
11/25/2012*; 6:00 pm, BTN	at No. 1 Indiana	L 53–101	2–2	Assembly Hall (17,126); Bloomington, IN
11/28/2012*; 7:00 pm	Cleveland State	L 63–69	2–3	John E. Worthen Arena (3,147); Muncie, IN
12/01/2012*; 2:00 pm, WNDY	at Butler	L 53–67	2–4	Hinkle Fieldhouse (8,282); Indianapolis, IN
12/05/2012*; 7:00 pm	Holy Cross (IN)	W 76–57	3–4	John E. Worthen Arena (2,851); Muncie, IN
12/08/2012*; 1:00 pm	South Dakota	W 62–51	4–4	John E. Worthen Arena (2,884); Muncie, IN
12/15/2012*; 8:00 pm	at South Dakota	W 80–73	5–4	DakotaDome (1,831); Vermillion, SD
12/18/2012*; 7:00 pm, ESPN3	at Purdue	L 56–66	5–5	Mackey Arena (8,008); West Lafayette, IN
12/23/2012*; 2:00 pm	IUPUI	L 68–77	5–6	John E. Worthen Arena (2,672); Muncie, IN
01/02/2013*; 7:00 pm	Norfolk State	W 62–61	6–6	John E. Worthen Arena (2,633); Muncie, IN
01/09/2013; 7:00 pm	at Eastern Michigan	W 60–58	7–6 (1–0)	Eastern Michigan University Convocation Center (826); Ypsilanti, MI
01/12/2013; 2:00 pm	Kent State	L 47–61	7–7 (1–1)	John E. Worthen Arena (3,658); Muncie, IN
01/16/2013; 7:00 pm	at Akron	L 64–71	7–8 (1–2)	James A. Rhodes Arena (3,169); Akron, OH
01/19/2013; 7:00 pm	at Central Michigan	L 57–71	7–9 (1–3)	McGuirk Arena (2,043); Mount Pleasant, MI
01/23/2013; 7:00 pm	Buffalo	L 63–66	7–10 (1–4)	John E. Worthen Arena (2,965); Muncie, IN
01/26/2013; 3:00 pm	at Miami (OH)	W 82–62	8–10 (2–4)	Millett Hall (1,573); Oxford, OH
01/30/2013; 7:00 pm	Toledo	L 78–85	8–11 (2–5)	John E. Worthen Arena (3,219); Muncie, IN
02/02/2013; 2:00 pm	at Bowling Green	L 59–70	8–12 (2–6)	Stroh Center (3,128); Bowling Green, OH
02/06/2013; 7:00 pm	Ohio	L 42–69	8–13 (2–7)	John E. Worthen Arena (3,114); Muncie, IN
02/09/2013; 6:00 pm, STO/ESPN3	Western Michigan	W 65–62	9–13 (3–7)	John E. Worthen Arena (3,458); Muncie, IN
02/13/2013; 8:00 pm	at Northern Illinois	W 56–52	10–13 (4–7)	Convocation Center (864); DeKalb, IL
02/16/2013; 2:00 pm	Eastern Michigan	L 50–56	10–14 (4–8)	John E. Worthen Arena (3,491); Muncie, IN
02/23/2013*; 6:30 pm	at Southeast Missouri State; BracketBusters	W 85–82	11–14	Show Me Center (2,484); Cape Girardeau, MO
02/27/2013; 7:00 pm	Central Michigan	W 95–90	12–14 (5–8)	John E. Worthen Arena (2,901); Muncie, IN
03/02/2013; 2:00 pm	at Toledo	W 86–72	13–14 (6–8)	Savage Arena (3,904); Toledo, OH
03/05/2013; 7:00 pm	at Western Michigan	W 89–85	14–14 (7–8)	University Arena (2,539); Kalamazoo, MI
03/09/2013; 2:00 pm	Northern Illinois	W 53–51	15–14 (8–8)	John E. Worthen Arena (3,237); Muncie, IN
2013 MAC men's basketball tournament
03/13/2013; 6:30 pm, STO/ESPN3	vs. Buffalo; Second Round	L 61–76	15–15	Quicken Loans Arena (2,147); Cleveland, OH
*Non-conference game. ^{#}Rankings from AP Poll. (#) Tournament seedings in parentheses. All times are in Eastern Time.
