= 2012–13 Kent State Golden Flashes men's basketball team =

American college basketball season

2012–13 Kent State Golden Flashes men's basketball

CIT, Second Round
- Conference: Mid-American Conference
- East Division
- Record: 21–14 (9–7 MAC)
- Head coach: Rob Senderoff (2nd season)
- Assistant coaches: Eric Haut; Bobby Steinburg; DeAndre Haynes
- Home arena: Memorial Athletic and Convocation Center

2012–13 Mid-American Conference men's basketball standings
	Conf.				Overall
Team	W		L	PCT	W		L	PCT
East
Akron †	14	–	2	.875	26	–	7	.788
Ohio	14	–	2	.875	24	–	10	.706
Kent State	9	–	7	.563	21	–	14	.600
Buffalo	7	–	9	.438	14	–	20	.412
Bowling Green	7	–	9	.438	13	–	19	.406
Miami	3	–	13	.188	9	–	22	.290
West
Western Michigan	10	–	6	.625	22	–	13	.629
Toledo*	10	–	6	.625	15	–	13	.536
Ball State	8	–	8	.500	15	–	15	.500
Eastern Michigan	7	–	9	.438	16	–	18	.471
Central Michigan	4	–	12	.250	11	–	20	.355
Northern Illinois	3	–	13	.188	5	–	25	.167
† 2013 MAC tournament winner As of March 27, 2013; *Ineligible for postseason due to APR penalties Rankings from AP Poll

The 2012–13 Kent State Golden Flashes men's basketball team represented Kent State University during the 2012–13 NCAA Division I men's basketball season. The Golden Flashes, led by second year head coach Rob Senderoff, played their home games at the Memorial Athletic and Convocation Center and were members of the East Division of the Mid-American Conference. They finished the season 21–14, 9–7 in MAC play to finish third place in the East Division. They advanced to the semifinals of the MAC tournament where they lost to Akron. They were invited to the 2013 CIT where they defeated Fairfield in the first round before losing in the second round to Loyola (MD).

== Roster ==
Number	Name	Position	Height	Weight	Year	Hometown
0	Bryson Pope	Guard	6–6	220	Senior	Jenks, Oklahoma
1	Kris Brewer	Guard	6–4	185	Sophomore	Memphis, Tennessee
2	Kellon Thomas	Guard	5–11	180	Freshman	Indianapolis, Indiana
3	Randal Holt	Guard	6–1	170	Senior	Cleveland, Ohio
4	Chris Ortiz	Forward	6–8	220	Freshman	Brooklyn, New York
5	Chris Evans	Forward	6–7	220	Senior	Chesapeake, Virginia
11	Devareaux Manley	Guard	6–4	195	Sophomore	Oakland, California
13	Mark Henniger	Forward	6–9	215	Junior	Massillon, Ohio
14	K.K. Simmons	Guard	6–4	190	Sophomore	Marietta, Georgia
20	Justin Brunswick	Forward	6–10	215	Sophomore	Middletown, Ohio
21	Khaliq Spicer	Forward	6–9	210	Freshman	Dearborn Heights, Michigan
23	Earvin Morris Jr.	Forward	6–5	185	Freshman	Memphis, Tennessee
25	Shakir Dunning	Guard	6–1	195	Sophomore	Columbus, Ohio
30	Brian Frank	Forward	6–5	225	Senior	Gainesville, Florida
32	Melvin Tabb	Forward	6–9	250	Junior	Raleigh, North Carolina
42	Darren Goodson	Guard/Forward	6–5	245	Junior	Cincinnati, Ohio

== Schedule ==
Date time, TV	Opponent	Result	Record	Site (attendance) city, state
Exhibition
11/04/2012*; 7:00 pm, STO	Rochester College	W 77–71		M.A.C. Center; Kent, OH
Regular season
11/09/2012*; 7:00 pm	Drexel	W 66–62 ^{OT}	1–0	M.A.C. Center (2,650); Kent, OH
11/13/2012*; 12:00 pm, ESPN	Temple; ESPN College Hoops Tip-Off Marathon	L 66–80	1–1	M.A.C. Center (2,415); Kent, OH
11/16/2012*; 7:00 pm	Chicago State	W 92–63	2–1	M.A.C. Center (2,380); Kent, OH
11/18/2012*; 2:00 pm	Valparaiso	L 83–88 ^{OT}	2–2	M.A.C. Center (1,858); Kent, OH
11/20/2012*; 7:00 pm	Bethune-Cookman	W 69–68	3–2	M.A.C. Center (1,958); Kent, OH
11/24/2012*; 9:00 pm, BTN	at Nebraska	W 74–60	4–2	Bob Devaney Sports Center (5,947); Lincoln, NE
11/28/2012*; 7:00 pm	at Youngstown State	W 85–78 ^{OT}	5–2	Beeghly Center (3,108); Youngstown, OH
12/01/2012*; 7:00 pm	Princeton	L 50–62	5–3	M.A.C. Center (2,715); Kent, OH
12/04/2012*; 7:00 pm	at Bucknell	L 60–76	5–4	Sojka Pavilion (2,646); Lewisburg, PA
12/09/2012*; 4:00 pm, FS Ohio	at Xavier	L 55–62	5–5	Cintas Center (9,622); Cincinnati, OH
12/20/2012*; 7:00 pm	Saint Francis (PA)	W 77–48	6–5	M.A.C. Center (636); Kent, OH
12/22/2012*; 7:00 pm	Arkansas State	W 73–69	7–5	M.A.C. Center (2,325); Kent, OH
12/30/2012*; 7:00 pm	Fairmont State	W 77–75	8–5	M.A.C. Center (2,164); Kent, OH
01/02/2013*; 6:00 pm	at Cleveland State	W 72–55	9–5	Wolstein Center (2,847); Cleveland, OH
01/09/2013; 7:00 pm	Toledo	L 58–70	9–6 (0–1)	M.A.C. Center (2,178); Kent, OH
01/12/2013; 2:00 pm	at Ball State	W 61–47	10–6 (1–1)	John E. Worthen Arena (3,658); Muncie, IN
01/16/2013; 7:00 pm, STO/ESPN3	at Buffalo	W 80–68	11–6 (2–1)	Alumni Arena (3,057); Amherst, NY
01/19/2013; 3:00 pm, ESPNU	Akron	L 67–71	11–7 (2–2)	M.A.C. Center (6,313); Kent, OH
01/23/2013; 7:00 pm	at Bowling Green	L 55–70	11–8 (2–3)	Stroh Center (1,856); Bowling Green, OH
01/26/2013; 6:00 pm, ESPN3	Ohio	L 68–69	11–9 (2–4)	M.A.C. Center (5,453); Kent, OH
01/30/2013; 8:00 pm	at Northern Illinois	L 65–67	11–10 (2–5)	Convocation Center (719); DeKalb, IL
02/02/2013; 6:00 pm, STO/ESPN3	Eastern Michigan	W 77–62	12–10 (3–5)	M.A.C. Center (2,267); Kent, OH
02/06/2013; 7:00 pm	at Western Michigan	L 76–82	12–11 (3–6)	University Arena (2,721); Kalamazoo, MI
02/09/2013; 7:00 pm	Central Michigan	W 87–72	13–11 (4–6)	M.A.C. Center (2,384); Kent, OH
02/13/2013; 7:00 pm, STO	Miami (OH)	W 87–70	14–11 (5–6)	M.A.C. Center (2,289); Kent, OH
02/16/2013; 11:00 am, ESPNU	at Ohio	L 75–78 ^{OT}	14–12 (5–7)	Convocation Center (8,483); Athens, OH
02/23/2013*; 3:00 pm	at Loyola–Chicago; BracketBusters	W 70–63	15–12	Joseph J. Gentile Arena (1,945); Chicago, IL
02/27/2013; 7:00 pm	Buffalo	W 83–81 ^{OT}	16–12 (6–7)	M.A.C. Center (2,255); Kent, OH
03/02/2013; 3:00 pm	at Miami (OH)	W 78–58	17–12 (7–7)	Millett Hall (2,125); Oxford, OH
03/05/2013; 7:00 pm	Bowling Green	W 69–61	18–12 (8–7)	M.A.C. Center (2,853); Kent, OH
03/08/2013; 7:00 pm, ESPN2	at Akron	W 68–64	19–12 (9–7)	James A. Rhodes Arena (5,699); Akron, OH
2013 MAC men's basketball tournament
03/14/2013; 6:30 pm, STO/ESPN3	vs. Buffalo; Quarterfinals	W 70–68	20–12	Quicken Loans Arena (3,361); Cleveland, OH
03/15/2013; 6:30 pm, STO/ESPN3	vs. Akron; Semifinals	L 59–62	20–13	Quicken Loans Arena (10,324); Cleveland, OH
2013 CIT
03/20/2013*; 7:00 pm	Fairfield; First Round	W 73–71	21–13	M.A.C. Center (1,855); Kent, OH
03/24/2013*; 3:00 pm	at Loyola (MD); Second Round	L 59–73	21–14	Reitz Arena (747); Baltimore, MD
*Non-conference game. ^{#}Rankings from AP Poll. (#) Tournament seedings in parentheses. All times are in Eastern Time.
