= 2012–13 Bowling Green Falcons men's basketball team =

American college basketball season

2012–13 Bowling Green Falcons men's basketball
- Conference: Mid-American Conference
- East Division
- Record: 13–19 (7–9 MAC)
- Head coach: Louis Orr (6th season)
- Assistant coaches: LaMonta Stone; Louis Twigg; Dennis Hopson
- Home arena: Stroh Center

2012–13 Mid-American Conference men's basketball standings
	Conf.				Overall
Team	W		L	PCT	W		L	PCT
East
Akron †	14	–	2	.875	26	–	7	.788
Ohio	14	–	2	.875	24	–	10	.706
Kent State	9	–	7	.563	21	–	14	.600
Buffalo	7	–	9	.438	14	–	20	.412
Bowling Green	7	–	9	.438	13	–	19	.406
Miami	3	–	13	.188	9	–	22	.290
West
Western Michigan	10	–	6	.625	22	–	13	.629
Toledo*	10	–	6	.625	15	–	13	.536
Ball State	8	–	8	.500	15	–	15	.500
Eastern Michigan	7	–	9	.438	16	–	18	.471
Central Michigan	4	–	12	.250	11	–	20	.355
Northern Illinois	3	–	13	.188	5	–	25	.167
† 2013 MAC tournament winner As of March 27, 2013; *Ineligible for postseason due to APR penalties Rankings from AP Poll

The 2012–13 Bowling Green Falcons men's basketball team represented Bowling Green State University during the 2012–13 NCAA Division I men's basketball season. The Falcons, led by sixth-year head coach Louis Orr, played their home games at the Stroh Center in Bowling Green, Ohio and were members of the East Division of the Mid-American Conference (MAC). They finished the season 13–19, 7–9 in MAC play, to finish in a tie for fourth place in the East Division. They lost in the first round of the MAC tournament to Miami (OH).

== Roster ==
Number	Name	Position	Height	Weight	Year	Hometown
0	Spencer Parker	Forward	6' 7"	207	Freshman	West Bloomfield, MI
1	Jordon Crawford	Guard	5' 6"	150	Senior	Cincinnati, OH
2	Anthony Henderson	Guard	6' 1"	173	Sophomore	Toledo, OH
3	Luke Kraus	Guard	6' 1"	210	Senior	Findlay, OH
5	Desmond Rorie	Forward/center	6' 9"	234	Freshman	Canton, OH
10	Craig Sealey	Forward	6' 6"	212	Junior	Columbus, OH
11	Damarkeo Lyshe	Guard	5' 11"	158	Sophomore	Westerville, OH
12	James Erger	Forward	6' 7"	201	Senior	McKinney, TX
15	Auston Calhoun	Forward	6' 7"	234	Senior	Southfield, MI
20	Jehvon Clarke	Guard	6' 1"	179	Sophomore	Canton, OH
21	Chauncey Orr	Guard/forward	6' 4"	207	Sophomore	Bowling Green, OH
22	Richaun Holmes	Forward	6' 8"	214	Sophomore	Lockport, IL
31	Josh Gomez	Center	6' 10"	231	Freshman	The Bronx, NY
35	Cameron Black	Forward/center	6' 10"	248	Junior	Kent, OH

== Schedule ==
Date time, TV	Opponent	Result	Record	Site (attendance) city, state
Exhibition
November 4, 2012*; 2:00 p.m.	Central State	W 73–60		Stroh Center (1,249); Bowling Green, OH
Regular season
November 9, 2012*; 7:00 p.m.	Lake Erie College	W 63–53	1–0	Stroh Center (1,731); Bowling Green, OH
November 12, 2012*; 6:00 p.m.	vs. Cleveland State; NIT Season Tip-Off	L 73–79 ^{OT}	1–1	Crisler Center (8,412); Ann Arbor, MI
November 13, 2012*; 5:00 p.m.	vs. IUPUI; NIT Season Tip-Off	L 66–80	1–2	Crisler Center (8,622); Ann Arbor, MI
November 19, 2012*; 7:30 p.m.	Robert Morris; NIT Season Tip-Off	L 60–71	1–3	Charles L. Sewall Center (248); Moon Township, PA
November 20, 2012*; 5:00 p.m.	vs. Alabama–Huntsville; NIT Season Tip-Off	W 68–54	2–3	Charles L. Sewall Center (230); Moon Township, PA
November 27, 2012*; 7:00 p.m.	Detroit	W 70–65	3–3	Stroh Center (1,661); Bowling Green, OH
December 1, 2012*; 2:00 p.m.	Youngstown State	L 49–58	3–4	Stroh Center (1,624); Bowling Green, OH
December 3, 2012*; 7:00 p.m.	Wright State	W 54–41	4–4	Stroh Center (1,351); Bowling Green, OH
December 8, 2012*; 2:00 p.m.	Samford	W 57–42	5–4	Stroh Center (1,341); Bowling Green, OH
December 18, 2012*; 7:00 p.m., ESPNU	No. 20 Michigan State	L 53–64	5–5	Stroh Center (4,291); Bowling Green, OH
December 21, 2012*; 7:00 p.m.	at South Florida	L 84–87 ^{3OT}	5–6	USF Sun Dome (4,008); Tampa, FL
December 28, 2012*; 8:00 p.m.	at North Dakota	L 53–56	5–7	Betty Engelstad Sioux Center (1,681); Grand Forks, ND
December 31, 2012*; 2:00 p.m.	at Temple	L 57–75	5–8	Liacouras Center (4,055); Philadelphia, PA
January 9, 2013; 7:00 p.m.	at Central Michigan	L 67–73	5–9 (0–1)	McGuirk Arena (2,187); Mount Pleasant, MI
January 12, 2013; 6:00 p.m., STO/ESPN3	at Eastern Michigan	W 46–44	6–9 (1–1)	Stroh Center (2,180); Bowling Green, OH
January 16, 2013; 7:00 p.m.	at Miami (OH)	L 60–63	6–10 (1–2)	Millett Hall (1,405); Oxford, OH
January 19, 2013; 7:00 p.m.	at Buffalo	L 65–68	6–11 (1–3)	Alumni Arena (3,026); Amherst, NY
January 23, 2013; 7:00 p.m.	at Kent State	W 70–55	7–11 (2–3)	Stroh Center (1,856); Bowling Green, OH
January 26, 2013; 7:00 p.m.	at Toledo	L 62–75	7–12 (2–4)	Savage Arena (6,361); Toledo, OH
January 30, 2013; 7:00 p.m., STO	at Akron	L 55–68	7–13 (2–5)	Stroh Center (2,168); Bowling Green, OH
February 2, 2013; 2:00 p.m.	Ball State	W 70–59	8–13 (3–5)	Stroh Center (3,128); Bowling Green, OH
February 6, 2013; 8:00 p.m.	at Northern Illinois	W 57–41	9–13 (4–5)	Convocation Center (708); DeKalb, IL
February 9, 2013; 2:00 p.m.	at Ohio	L 63–72	9–14 (4–6)	Convocation Center (10,846); Athens, OH
February 13, 2013; 7:00 p.m.	Western Michigan	W 70–60	10–14 (5–6)	Stroh Center (1,579); Bowling Green, OH
February 16, 2013; 7:30 p.m.	at Akron	L 50–67	10–15 (5–7)	James A. Rhodes Arena (5,247); Akron, OH
February 21, 2013*; 7:00 p.m.	New Orleans	W 87–56	11–15	Stroh Center (1,517); Bowling Green, OH
February 23, 2013*; 7:00 p.m.	at IPFW; BracketBusters	L 75–88	11–16	Allen County War Memorial Coliseum (1,577); Fort Wayne, IN
February 27, 2013; 7:00 p.m.	Miami (OH)	W 52–44	12–16 (6–7)	Stroh Center (1,589); Bowling Green, OH
March 2, 2013; 12:00 p.m., ESPN3	Ohio	L 65–78	12–17 (6–8)	Stroh Center (2,662); Bowling Green, OH
March 5, 2013; 7:00 p.m.	at Kent State	L 61–69	12–18 (6–9)	MAC Center (2,853); Kent, OH
March 8, 2013; 6:00 p.m.	Buffalo	W 76–65	13–18 (7–9)	Stroh Center (1,478); Bowling Green, OH
2013 MAC tournament
March 11, 2013; 7:00 p.m.	Miami (OH); First round	L 52–63	13–19	Stroh Center (1,715); Bowling Green, OH
*Non-conference game. ^{#}Rankings from AP poll. (#) Tournament seedings in parentheses. All times are in Eastern.
