= 2012–13 Akron Zips men's basketball team =

American college basketball season

2012–13 Akron Zips men's basketball
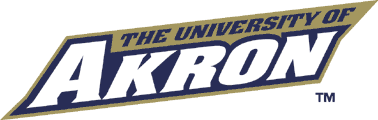

MAC tournament champions MAC Regular Season Co-Champions MAC East Division Co-Champions

NCAA Tournament, Round of 64
- Conference: Mid-American Conference
- East Division
- Record: 26–7 (14–2 MAC)
- Head coach: Keith Dambrot (9th season)
- Assistant coaches: Rick McFadden; Charles Thomas; Terry Weigand
- Home arena: James A. Rhodes Arena

2012–13 Mid-American Conference men's basketball standings
	Conf.				Overall
Team	W		L	PCT	W		L	PCT
East
Akron †	14	–	2	.875	26	–	7	.788
Ohio	14	–	2	.875	24	–	10	.706
Kent State	9	–	7	.563	21	–	14	.600
Buffalo	7	–	9	.438	14	–	20	.412
Bowling Green	7	–	9	.438	13	–	19	.406
Miami	3	–	13	.188	9	–	22	.290
West
Western Michigan	10	–	6	.625	22	–	13	.629
Toledo*	10	–	6	.625	15	–	13	.536
Ball State	8	–	8	.500	15	–	15	.500
Eastern Michigan	7	–	9	.438	16	–	18	.471
Central Michigan	4	–	12	.250	11	–	20	.355
Northern Illinois	3	–	13	.188	5	–	25	.167
† 2013 MAC tournament winner As of March 27, 2013; *Ineligible for postseason due to APR penalties Rankings from AP Poll

The 2012–13 Akron Zips men's basketball team represented the University of Akron during the 2012–13 NCAA Division I men's basketball season. The Zips, led by ninth year head coach Keith Dambrot, played their home games at James A. Rhodes Arena and were members of the East Division of the Mid-American Conference. They finished the season 26–7, 14–2 in MAC play to finish in a tie with Ohio for the East Division championship and the overall MAC regular season championship. They were also champions of the MAC tournament, defeating Ohio in the championship game, to earn the conference's automatic bid to the 2013 NCAA tournament where they lost in the second round to VCU.

== Roster ==
Number	Name	Position	Height	Weight	Year	Hometown
1	Demetrius Treadwell	Forward	6–7	225	Junior	Euclid, Ohio
2	Brian Walsh	Guard	6–5	200	Senior	Coraopolis, Pennsylvania
3	Luke Avsec	Guard	5–10	180	Junior	Cleveland, Ohio
4	Deji Ibitayo	Guard	6–3	205	Sophomore	Chicago, Illinois
10	Nick Harney	Forward	6–8	210	Junior	Cleveland, Ohio
11	Alex Abreu	Guard	5–10	175	Junior	Bayamón, Puerto Rico
12	Carmelo Betancourt	Guard	5–11	175	Freshman	Rio Piedras, Puerto Rico
14	Blake Justice	Guard	6–3	195	Freshman	Peebles, Ohio
15	Jake Kretzer	Forward	6–7	210	Freshman	Waverly, Ohio
21	Reggie McAdams	Forward	6–7	200	Freshman	Elida, Ohio
23	Chauncey Gilliam	Forward	6–5	230	Senior	Columbia, Maryland
33	Josh Egner	Forward	6–7	215	Sophomore	Massillon, Ohio
34	Pat Forsythe	Center	6–11	240	Freshman	Brunswick, Ohio
44	Zeke Marshall	Center	7–0	235	Senior	McKeesport, Pennsylvania

== Schedule ==
Date time, TV	Rank^{#}	Opponent^{#}	Result	Record	Site (attendance) city, state
Exhibition
10/31/2012*; 7:00 pm		Tiffin	W 111–72		James A. Rhodes Arena (2,683); Akron, OH
11/03/2012*; 5:00 pm		Malone	W 106–67		James A. Rhodes Arena (2,454); Akron, OH
Regular season
11/09/2012*; 7:30 pm		at Coastal Carolina	L 70–74 ^{OT}	0–1	HTC Center (3,278); Conway, SC
11/12/2012*; 7:00 pm		John Carroll	W 97–53	1–1	James A. Rhodes Arena (2,892); Akron, OH
11/15/2012*; 10:30 am, ESPNU		vs. Oklahoma State; Puerto Rico Tip-Off Quarterfinals	L 65–69 ^{OT}	1–2	Coliseo Rubén Rodríguez (N/A); Bayamón, Puerto Rico
11/16/2012*; 11:00 am, ESPN3		vs. UNC Asheville; Puerto Rico Tip-Off	W 82–63	2–2	Coliseo Rubén Rodríguez (N/A); Bayamón, Puerto Rico
11/18/2012*; 1:30 pm, ESPNU		vs. Penn State; Puerto Rico Tip-Off	W 85–60	3–2	Coliseo Rubén Rodríguez (N/A); Bayamón, Puerto Rico
12/02/2012*; 2:00 pm		Middle Tennessee	W 82–77 ^{OT}	4–2	James A. Rhodes Arena (2,711); Akron, OH
12/09/2012*; 2:00 pm, ESPN3		at No. 16 Creighton	L 61–77	4–3	CenturyLink Center Omaha (16,310); Omaha, NE
12/15/2012*; 12:00 pm		at Detroit	L 73–80	4–4	Calihan Hall (1,639); Detroit, MI
12/18/2012*; 8:00 pm		Arkansas–Pine Bluff	W 76–46	5–4	James A. Rhodes Arena (2,639); Akron, OH
12/23/2012*; 2:00 pm		Cleveland State	W 87–57	6–4	James A. Rhodes Arena (3,240); Akron, OH
12/27/2012*; 7:00 pm		Texas Southern	W 83–68	7–4	James A. Rhodes Arena (2,503); Akron, OH
12/30/2012*; 7:00 pm		Princeton	W 62–58	8–4	James A. Rhodes Arena (3,392); Akron, OH
01/02/2013*; 7:00 pm		Coppin State	W 91–63	9–4	James A. Rhodes Arena (2,227); Akron, OH
01/09/2013; 7:00 pm		Western Michigan	W 65–43	10–4 (1–0)	James A. Rhodes Arena (2,565); Akron, OH
01/12/2013; 4:00 pm		at Northern Illinois	W 68–53	11–4 (2–0)	Convocation Center (977); DeKalb, IL
01/16/2013; 7:00 pm		Ball State	W 71–64	12–4 (3–0)	James A. Rhodes Arena (3,169); Akron, OH
01/19/2013; 3:00 pm, ESPNU		at Kent State	W 71–67	13–4 (4–0)	MAC Center (6,313); Kent, OH
01/23/2013; 7:00 pm, STO/ESPN3		at Toledo	W 71–56	14–4 (5–0)	Savage Arena (3,921); Toledo, OH
01/26/2013; 7:00 pm		Buffalo	W 68–64	15–4 (6–0)	James A. Rhodes Arena (5,403); Akron, OH
01/30/2013; 7:00 pm, STO		at Bowling Green	W 68–55	16–4 (7–0)	Stroh Center (2,168); Bowling Green, OH
02/02/2013; 5:00 pm, ESPNU		Ohio	W 86–72	17–4 (8–0)	James A. Rhodes Arena (5,770); Akron, OH
02/05/2013; 7:00 pm, STO/ESPN3		Central Michigan	W 68–56	18–4 (9–0)	James A. Rhodes Arena (3,385); Akron, OH
02/09/2013; 1:00 pm, ESPNU		at Miami (OH)	W 54–50	19–4 (10–0)	Millett Hall (1,698); Oxford, OH
02/13/2013; 7:00 pm		at Eastern Michigan	W 70–62	20–4 (11–0)	EMU Convocation Center (672); Ypsilanti, MI
02/16/2013; 7:30 pm		Bowling Green	W 67–50	21–4 (12–0)	James A. Rhodes Arena (5,247); Akron, OH
02/22/2013*; 7:00 pm, ESPN2		North Dakota State; BracketBusters	W 68–53	22–4	James A. Rhodes Arena (4,474); Akron, OH
02/27/2013; 7:00 pm, STO		at Ohio	W 88–81 ^{OT}	23–4 (13–0)	Convocation Center (11,109); Athens, OH
03/02/2013; 6:00 pm, ESPN3		at Buffalo	L 67–81	23–5 (13–1)	Alumni Arena (4,204); Amherst, NY
03/05/2013; 7:00 pm, STO/ESPN3		Miami (OH)	W 72–58	24–5 (14–1)	James A. Rhodes Arena (5,189); Akron, OH
03/08/2013; 7:00 pm, ESPN2		Kent State; PNC Wagon Wheel Challenge	L 64–68	24–6 (14–2)	James A. Rhodes Arena (5,699); Akron, OH
2013 MAC men's basketball tournament
03/15/2013; 6:30 pm, STO/ESPN3	(1)	vs. (4) Kent State; Semifinals	W 62–59	25–6	Quicken Loans Arena (10,324); Cleveland, OH
03/16/2013; 6:30 pm, ESPN2	(1)	vs. (2) Ohio; Championship Game	W 65–46	26–6	Quicken Loans Arena (12,102); Cleveland, OH
2013 NCAA tournament
03/21/2013*; 9:45 pm, CBS	(12)	vs. (5) VCU; Second Round	L 42–88	26–7	The Palace of Auburn Hills (19,829); Auburn Hills, MI
*Non-conference game. ^{#}Rankings from AP Poll. (#) Tournament seedings in parentheses. All times are in Eastern Time. (#) during NCAA Tournament is seed with Region S=South.
