= 2012–13 Central Michigan Chippewas men's basketball team =

American college basketball season

2012–13 Central Michigan Chippewas men's basketball
- Conference: Mid-American Conference
- West Division
- Record: 11–20 (4–12 MAC)
- Head coach: Keno Davis (1st season)
- Assistant coaches: Kevin Gamble; Jeff Smith; Kyle Gerdeman
- Home arena: McGuirk Arena

2012–13 Mid-American Conference men's basketball standings
	Conf.				Overall
Team	W		L	PCT	W		L	PCT
East
Akron †	14	–	2	.875	26	–	7	.788
Ohio	14	–	2	.875	24	–	10	.706
Kent State	9	–	7	.563	21	–	14	.600
Buffalo	7	–	9	.438	14	–	20	.412
Bowling Green	7	–	9	.438	13	–	19	.406
Miami	3	–	13	.188	9	–	22	.290
West
Western Michigan	10	–	6	.625	22	–	13	.629
Toledo*	10	–	6	.625	15	–	13	.536
Ball State	8	–	8	.500	15	–	15	.500
Eastern Michigan	7	–	9	.438	16	–	18	.471
Central Michigan	4	–	12	.250	11	–	20	.355
Northern Illinois	3	–	13	.188	5	–	25	.167
† 2013 MAC tournament winner As of March 27, 2013; *Ineligible for postseason due to APR penalties Rankings from AP Poll

The 2012–13 Central Michigan Chippewas men's basketball team represented Central Michigan University during the 2012–13 NCAA Division I men's basketball season. The Chippewas, led by first-year head coach Keno Davis, played their home games at the McGuirk Arena and were members of the West Division of the Mid-American Conference. They finished the season 11–20, 4–12 in MAC play to finish in fifth place in the West Division. They lost in the first round of the MAC tournament to Buffalo.

== Roster ==
Number	Name	Position	Height	Weight	Year	Hometown
1	Spencer Krannitz	Guard/forward	6–3	181	Freshman	North Muskegon, Michigan
2	DeAndray Buckley	Guard/forward	6–4	220	Junior	Romulus, Michigan
3	Derrick Richardson Jr.	Guard	6–2	187	Freshman	Ypsilanti, Michigan
4	Rick Rowse	Guard	6–2	204	Junior	Flushing, Michigan
5	Finis Craddock	Guard	6–1	181	Senior	Garland, Texas
12	Kyle Randall	Guard	5–10	169	Senior	Youngstown, Ohio
15	Chris Fowler	Guard	6–0	185	Freshman	Southfield, Michigan
20	Luke Wiest	Guard	5–9	180	Junior	Caledonia, Michigan
23	Austin Stewart	Guard	6–6	193	Freshman	Normal, Illinois
24	Blake Hibbitts	Forward	6–7	203	Freshman	Hudsonville, Michigan
25	Olivier Mbaigoto	Forward	6–6	202	Senior	Chad
33	Austin Keel	Guard	6–4	188	Sophomore	Winter Springs, Florida
34	John Simons	Forward	6–8	209	Freshman	Cadillac, Michigan
41	Zach Saylor	Forward	6–8	232	Senior	Lansing, Michigan

== Schedule ==
Date time, TV	Opponent	Result	Record	Site (attendance) city, state
Exhibition
11/07/2012*; 7:00 pm	Lake Superior State	W 86–76		McGuirk Arena (1,569); Mount Pleasant, MI
Regular season
11/12/2012*; 7:30 pm, BTN	at Iowa	L 61–73	0–1	Carver-Hawkeye Arena (10,578); Iowa City, IA
11/16/2012*; 7:00 pm	Olivet	W 76–62	1–1	McGuirk Arena (2,187); Mount Pleasant, MI
11/21/2012*; 7:00 pm	vs. Wright State; Utah Thanksgiving Tournament	W 59–55	2–1	Jon M. Huntsman Center (7,898); Salt Lake City, UT
11/23/2012*; 7:00 pm, Pac-12 Network	at Utah; Utah Thanksgiving Tournament	L 51–67	2–2	Jon M. Huntsman Center (7,599); Salt Lake City, UT
11/24/2012*; 6:30 pm	vs. Idaho State; Utah Thanksgiving Tournament	W 54–52	3–2	Jon M. Huntsman Center (7,649); Salt Lake City, UT
11/28/2012*; 7:00 pm	Bradley	L 65–82	3–3	McGuirk Arena (2,076); Mount Pleasant, MI
12/02/2012*; 2:00 pm	Niagara	W 66–64	4–3	McGuirk Arena (1,003); Mount Pleasant, MI
12/08/2012*; 2:00 pm	at Charlotte	L 66–78	4–4	Halton Arena (5,263); Charlotte, NC
12/16/2012*; 8:00 pm	at Pepperdine	W 80–77	5–4	Firestone Fieldhouse (707); Malibu, CA
12/20/2012*; 7:00 pm	Texas State	W 92–80	6–4	McGuirk Arena (1,215); Mount Pleasant, MI
12/22/2012*; 7:00 pm	vs. Nebraska; Sun Bowl Invitational	L 75–89	6–5	Don Haskins Center (7,132); El Paso, TX
12/23/2012*; 7:00 pm	vs. Arkansas–Pine Bluff; Sun Bowl Invitational	W 62–45	7–5	Don Haskins Center (7,532); El Paso, TX
12/29/2012*; 7:00 pm, BTN	at No. 2 Michigan	L 73–88	7–6	Crisler Center (12,693); Ann Arbor, MI
01/09/2013; 7:00 pm	Bowling Green	W 73–67	8–6 (1–0)	McGuirk Arena (2,187); Mount Pleasant, MI
01/12/2013; 7:00 pm	at Toledo	L 72–76 ^{OT}	8–7 (1–1)	Savage Arena (4,426); Toledo, OH
01/15/2013; 7:00 pm, STO/ESPN3	at Eastern Michigan	L 52–58	8–8 (1–2)	EMU Convocation Center (N/A); Ypsilanti, MI
01/19/2013; 7:00 pm	at Ball State	W 71–57	9–8 (2–2)	McGuirk Arena (2,043); Mount Pleasant, MI
01/23/2013; 7:00 pm	Northern Illinois	L 61–74	9–9 (2–3)	McGuirk Arena (1,347); Mount Pleasant, MI
01/26/2013; 7:00 pm	Western Michigan	L 59–76	9–10 (2–4)	McGuirk Arena (3,419); Mount Pleasant, MI
01/30/2013; 7:00 pm	at Buffalo	L 73–91	9–11 (2–5)	Alumni Arena (2,552); Amherst, NY
02/02/2013; 7:00 pm	Miami (OH)	L 61–70	9–12 (2–6)	McGuirk Arena (2,253); Mount Pleasant, MI
02/05/2013; 7:00 pm, STO/ESPN3	at Akron	L 56–68	9–13 (2–7)	James A. Rhodes Arena (3,385); Akron, OH
02/09/2013; 7:00 pm	at Kent State	L 72–87	9–14 (2–8)	M.A.C. Center (2,384); Kent, OH
02/13/2013; 7:00 pm	Ohio	L 63–82	9–15 (2–9)	McGuirk Arena (1,211); Mount Pleasant, MI
02/16/2013; 7:00 pm	Toledo	L 64–73	9–16 (2–10)	McGuirk Arena (1,574); Mount Pleasant, MI
02/23/2013*; 7:05 pm	at Youngstown State; BracketBusters	L 75–86	9–17	Beeghly Center (2,710); Youngstown, OH
02/27/2013; 7:00 pm	at Ball State	L 90–95	9–18 (2–11)	John E. Worthen Arena (2,901); Muncie, IN
03/02/2013; 8:00 pm	at Northern Illinois	W 69–50	10–18 (3–11)	Convocation Center (1,324); DeKalb, IL
03/05/2013; 7:00 pm	Eastern Michigan	W 61–59	11–18 (4–11)	McGuirk Arena (879); Mount Pleasant, MI
03/09/2013; 12:00 pm, ESPN3	at Western Michigan	L 68–71	11–19 (4–12)	University Arena (3,303); Kalamazoo, MI
2013 MAC men's basketball tournament
03/11/2013; 7:00 pm	Buffalo; First Round	L 72–74 ^{OT}	11–20	Alumni Arena (2,309); Amherst, NY
*Non-conference game. ^{#}Rankings from AP Poll. (#) Tournament seedings in parentheses. All times are in Eastern Time.
