= 2012–13 Buffalo Bulls men's basketball team =

American college basketball season

2012–13 Buffalo Bulls men's basketball
- Conference: Mid-American Conference
- East Division
- Record: 14–20 (7–9 MAC)
- Head coach: Reggie Witherspoon (14th season)
- Assistant coaches: Kevin Heck; Jim Kwitchoff; Turner Battle
- Home arena: Alumni Arena

2012–13 Mid-American Conference men's basketball standings
| | Conf. | | | | Overall |
| Team | W | | L | PCT | W | | L | PCT |
|---|---|---|---|---|---|---|---|---|
East
| Akron † | 14 | – | 2 | .875 | 26 | – | 7 | .788 |
| Ohio | 14 | – | 2 | .875 | 24 | – | 10 | .706 |
| Kent State | 9 | – | 7 | .563 | 21 | – | 14 | .600 |
| Buffalo | 7 | – | 9 | .438 | 14 | – | 20 | .412 |
| Bowling Green | 7 | – | 9 | .438 | 13 | – | 19 | .406 |
| Miami | 3 | – | 13 | .188 | 9 | – | 22 | .290 |
West
| Western Michigan | 10 | – | 6 | .625 | 22 | – | 13 | .629 |
| Toledo* | 10 | – | 6 | .625 | 15 | – | 13 | .536 |
| Ball State | 8 | – | 8 | .500 | 15 | – | 15 | .500 |
| Eastern Michigan | 7 | – | 9 | .438 | 16 | – | 18 | .471 |
| Central Michigan | 4 | – | 12 | .250 | 11 | – | 20 | .355 |
| Northern Illinois | 3 | – | 13 | .188 | 5 | – | 25 | .167 |
† 2013 MAC tournament winner As of March 27, 2013; *Ineligible for postseason due to APR penalties Rankings from AP Poll

The 2012–13 Buffalo Bulls men's basketball team represented the University at Buffalo, The State University of New York during the 2012–13 NCAA Division I men's basketball season. The Bulls, led by 14th year head coach Reggie Witherspoon, played their home games at Alumni Arena and were members of the East Division of the Mid-American Conference. They finished the season 14–20, 7–9 in MAC play to finish in a tie for fourth place in the East Division. They advanced to the quarterfinals of the MAC tournament, where they lost to Kent State.

Following the season, coach Reggie Witherspoon was fired. He posted a record of 198–228 in 14 seasons.

== Roster ==
| Number | Name | Position | Height | Weight | Year | Hometown |
|---|---|---|---|---|---|---|
| 0 | Raphell Thomas-Edwards | Forward | 6–6 | 240 | Sophomore | Leicester, England |
| 1 | Tony Watson | Guard | 6–2 | 180 | Senior | West Palm Beach, Florida |
| 2 | Will Regan | Forward | 6–8 | 230 | Sophomore | Buffalo, New York |
| 3 | Jarod Oldham | Guard | 6–3 | 185 | Junior | Decatur, Illinois |
| 4 | Richie Sebuharara | Guard | 6–0 | 165 | Senior | Vestal, New York |
| 5 | Corey Raley-Ross | Guard | 6–3 | 195 | Junior | Charlotte, North Carolina |
| 10 | Jarryn Skeete | Guard | 6–3 | 175 | Freshman | Brampton, Ontario |
| 12 | Javon McCrea | Forward | 6–7 | 250 | Junior | Newark, New York |
| 22 | Auraum Nuiriankh | Guard/Forward | 6–6 | 200 | Junior | Baltimore, Maryland |
| 24 | Stan Wier | Guard | 6–3 | 210 | Freshman | East Aurora, New York |
| 33 | Cameron Downing | Center | 6–9 | 260 | Junior | Tulsa, Oklahoma |
| 35 | Xavier Ford | Forward | 6–7 | 210 | Sophomore | Colorado Springs, Colorado |

== Schedule ==
| Date time, TV | Opponent | Result | Record | Site (attendance) city, state |
Regular season
| 11/10/2012*; 12:00 pm | Princeton | L 53–57 | 0–1 | Alumni Arena (4,450); Amherst, NY |
| 11/12/2012*; 7:00 pm, ESPN3 | at Florida State; Coaches Vs. Cancer Classic | L 68–95 | 0–2 | Donald L. Tucker Center (6,510); Tallahassee, FL |
| 11/15/2012*; 7:00 pm | at Evansville; Coaches Vs. Cancer Classic | W 56–50 | 1–2 | Ford Center (3,572); Evansville, IN |
| 11/16/2012*; 5:00 pm | vs. Western Illinois; Coaches Vs. Cancer Classic | L 58–67 | 1–3 | Ford Center (N/A); Evansville, IN |
| 11/17/2012*; 6:00 pm | vs. Yale; Coaches Vs. Cancer Classic | L 59–63 | 1–4 | Ford Center (N/A); Evansville, IN |
| 11/20/2012*; 8:00 pm | at Canisius | L 64–71 | 1–5 | Koessler Athletic Center (2,196); Buffalo, NY |
| 11/24/2012*; 7:00 pm | Mansfield | W 76–57 | 2–5 | Alumni Arena; Amherst, NY |
| 11/28/2012*; 7:00 pm, TWCS | Temple | L 39–54 | 2–6 | Alumni Arena (3,201); Amherst, NY |
| 12/01/2012*; 7:00 pm | at St. Bonaventure | L 79–82 | 2–7 | Reilly Center (4,485); St. Bonaventure, NY |
| 12/05/2012*; 8:00 pm | at Milwaukee | W 72–52 | 3–7 | Klotsche Center (1,776); Milwaukee, WI |
| 12/08/2012*; 7:30 pm | Niagara | W 77–67 | 4–7 | Alumni Arena (4,012); Amherst, NY |
| 12/21/2012*; 10:30 pm, Pac-12 Network | vs. Washington State; Cougar Hardwood Classic | L 54–65 | 4–8 | KeyArena (7,269); Seattle, WA |
| 12/28/2012*; 7:00 pm | Notre Dame College | W 84–64 | 5–8 | Alumni Arena (2,162); Amherst, NY |
| 01/02/2013*; 8:05 pm | at Tulsa | L 57–63 | 5–9 | Reynolds Center (3,894); Tulsa, OK |
| 01/09/2013; 7:00 pm, STO/ESPN3 | at Ohio | L 68–86 | 5–10 (0–1) | Convocation Center (4,846); Athens, OH |
| 01/12/2013; 7:00 pm | Miami (OH) | L 57–58 | 5–11 (0–2) | Alumni Arena (3,284); Amherst, NY |
| 01/16/2013; 7:00 pm, STO/ESPN3 | Kent State | L 68–80 | 5–12 (0–3) | Alumni Arena (3,057); Amherst, NY |
| 01/19/2013; 7:00 pm | Bowling Green | W 68–65 | 6–12 (1–3) | Alumni Arena (3,026); Amherst, NY |
| 01/23/2013; 7:00 pm | at Ball State | W 66–63 | 7–12 (2–3) | John E. Worthen Arena (2,965); Muncie, IN |
| 01/26/2013; 7:00 pm | at Akron | L 64–68 | 7–13 (2–4) | James A. Rhodes Arena (5,403); Akron, OH |
| 01/30/2013; 7:00 pm, TWCS | Central Michigan | W 91–73 | 8–13 (3–4) | Alumni Arena (2,552); Amherst, NY |
| 02/02/2013; 7:00 pm | at Western Michigan | L 60–71 | 8–14 (3–5) | University Arena (3,312); Kalamazoo, MI |
| 02/06/2013; 7:00 pm, STO/ESPN3 | at Eastern Michigan | L 46–65 | 8–15 (3–6) | EMU Convocation Center (522); Ypsilanti, MI |
| 02/09/2013; 1:00 pm | Northern Illinois | W 59–54 | 9–15 (4–6) | Alumni Arena (4,136); Amherst, NY |
| 02/13/2013; 7:00 pm, TWCS | Toledo | W 75–60 | 10–15 (5–6) | Alumni Arena (2,338); Amherst, NY |
| 02/16/2013; 3:30 pm, ESPN3 | at Miami (OH) | W 79–71 | 11–15 (6–6) | Millett Hall (1,067); Oxford, OH |
| 02/23/2013*; 2:00 pm | Manhattan; BracketBusters | L 64–65 | 11–16 | Alumni Arena (3,172); Amherst, NY |
| 02/27/2013; 7:00 pm | at Kent State | L 81–83 ^{OT} | 11–17 (6–7) | M.A.C. Center (2,255); Kent, OH |
| 03/02/2013; 6:00 pm, ESPN3 | Akron | W 81–67 | 12–17 (7–7) | Alumni Arena (4,204); Amherst, NY |
| 03/05/2013; 7:00 pm, TWCS | Ohio | L 69–72 | 12–18 (7–8) | Alumni Arena (3,132); Amherst, NY |
| 03/08/2013; 6:00 pm | at Bowling Green | L 65–76 | 12–19 (7–9) | Stroh Center (1,478); Bowling Green, OH |
2013 MAC men's basketball tournament
| 03/11/2013; 7:00 pm | Central Michigan; First Round | W 74–72 ^{OT} | 13–19 | Alumni Arena (2,309); Amherst, NY |
| 03/13/2013; 6:30 pm, STO/ESPN3 | vs. Ball State; Second Round | W 76–61 | 14–19 | Quicken Loans Arena (2,147); Cleveland, OH |
| 03/14/2013; 6:30 pm, STO/ESPN3 | vs. Kent State; Quarterfinals | L 68–70 | 14–20 | Quicken Loans Arena (3,361); Cleveland, OH |
*Non-conference game. ^{#}Rankings from AP Poll. (#) Tournament seedings in parentheses. All times are in Eastern Time.
