= 2012–13 Eastern Michigan Eagles men's basketball team =

American college basketball season

2012–13 Eastern Michigan Eagles men's basketball

"Ice Man" Classic
- Conference: Mid-American Conference
- West Division
- Record: 16–18 (7–9 MAC)
- Head coach: Rob Murphy (2nd season)
- Assistant coaches: Mike Brown; Kevin Mondro; Benny White
- Home arena: Eastern Michigan University Convocation Center

2012–13 Mid-American Conference men's basketball standings
	Conf.				Overall
Team	W		L	PCT	W		L	PCT
East
Akron †	14	–	2	.875	26	–	7	.788
Ohio	14	–	2	.875	24	–	10	.706
Kent State	9	–	7	.563	21	–	14	.600
Buffalo	7	–	9	.438	14	–	20	.412
Bowling Green	7	–	9	.438	13	–	19	.406
Miami	3	–	13	.188	9	–	22	.290
West
Western Michigan	10	–	6	.625	22	–	13	.629
Toledo*	10	–	6	.625	15	–	13	.536
Ball State	8	–	8	.500	15	–	15	.500
Eastern Michigan	7	–	9	.438	16	–	18	.471
Central Michigan	4	–	12	.250	11	–	20	.355
Northern Illinois	3	–	13	.188	5	–	25	.167
† 2013 MAC tournament winner As of March 27, 2013; *Ineligible for postseason due to APR penalties Rankings from AP Poll

The 2012–13 Eastern Michigan Eagles men's basketball team represented Eastern Michigan University during the 2012–13 NCAA Division I men's basketball season. The Eagles, led by second year head coach Rob Murphy, played their home games at the Eastern Michigan University Convocation Center and were members of the West Division of the Mid-American Conference. They finished the season 16–18, 7–9 in MAC play to finish in fourth place in the West Division. They won two games in the MAC tournament to advance to the quarterfinals where they lost to Western Michigan.

== Arrivals ==
Ray Lee Ranked as the 19th best point guard in the country by Scout.com and the 142nd best player overall in the 2012 class by Rivals.com committed to EMU. Jalen Ross (Greensboro Day School) another PG was a PACIS (Piedmont Athletic Conference of Independent Schools) All-Conference selection and MVP of the Pizza Hut Invitational in high school.

== Awards ==
All-MAC Honorable Mention

- Glenn Bryant

=== Statistics ===
Conference Team Highs

- Scoring Defense (59.1 Pg/G)
- 3-Point Fg Pct Defense (.299)
- Free Throw Pct 1.000 (4-4) at Kentucky (01/02/13)

Conference Individual Highs Free Throw Pct.

- Daylen Harrison vs Eastern Illinois (11-16-12) 1.000 (11-11)
- Anthony Strickland vs Akron (02-13-13) 1.000 (8-8)

Conference Opponent Lows

- Points 25 by Northern Illinois (01-26-13)
- Field Goals Made 8 by Northern Illinois (01-26-13)
- Field Goal Pct .131 (8-61) by Northern Illinois (01-26-13)
- Steals 1 by IPFW (11-17-12)
- Fouls 7 Michigan (12/20/12)

== Roster ==
Number	Name	Position	Height	Weight	Year	Hometown
0	Ray Lee	Guard	6–3	170	Freshman	Detroit, Michigan
1	Da'Shonte Riley	Center	7–0	233	Junior	Detroit, Michigan
2	J.R. Sims	Guard	6–3	175	Junior	Fort Wayne, Indiana
3	Austin Harper	Guard	6–2	190	Junior	Grand Haven, Michigan
4	James Still	Forward	6–10	205	Junior	Detroit, Michigan
5	Derek Thompson	Guard	6–3	178	Senior	Detroit, Michigan
10	Mike Talley	Guard	5–11	176	Junior	Detroit, Michigan
12	Antoine Chandler	Guard	5–10	158	Sophomore	Windsor, Canada
21	Jalen Ross	Guard	5–11	176	Freshman	Greensboro, North Carolina
22	Josh Lyle	Guard	6–4	186	Sophomore	Detroit, Michigan
23	Glenn Bryant	Forward	6–8	201	Junior	Detroit, Michigan
32	Jamell Harris	Forward	6–9	201	Senior	Euclid, Ohio
33	Anthony Strickland	Guard	6–5	219	Junior	Ypsilanti, Michigan
35	Daylen Harrison	Guard/Forward	6–6	214	Junior	Akron, Ohio
45	Matt Balkema	Center	6–10	286	Senior	Roseville, Michigan

James Still was dismissed from the team on November 16, 2012, following a guilty plea in felony charges stemming from an incident in April 2010, when he was enrolled at Providence College (see also 2010–11 Providence Friars men's basketball team#Offseason).

== Schedule ==
Date time, TV	Opponent	Result	Record	Site (attendance) city, state
Exhibition
11/02/2012*; 7:30 pm	Michigan–Dearborn	W 82–38		Convocation Center; Ypsilanti, MI
Regular season
11/09/2012*; 12:00 pm	Rochester College; EMU "Ice Man" Classic	W 66–52	1–0	Convocation Center (2,359); Ypsilanti, MI
11/11/2012*; 2:00 pm	at Jacksonville State	L 54–61	1–1	Pete Mathews Coliseum (1,032); Jacksonville, AL
11/16/2012*; 7:00 pm	Eastern Illinois; EMU "Ice Man" Classic	W 60–52	2–1	Convocation Center (881); Ypsilanti, MI
11/17/2012*; 7:00 pm	IPFW; EMU "Ice Man" Classic	W 60–47	3–1	Convocation Center (758); Ypsilanti, MI
11/18/2012*; 7:00 pm	Texas–Pan American; EMU "Ice Man" Classic	W 57–47	4–1	Convocation Center (938); Ypsilanti, MI
11/24/2012*; 6:30 pm	Madonna	W 75–57	5–1	Convocation Center (552); Ypsilanti, MI
12/03/2012*; 7:00 pm, ESPNU	at No. 4 Syracuse	L 48–84	5–2	Carrier Dome (20,822); Syracuse, NY
12/08/2012*; 2:00 pm, ESPN3	Purdue	W 47–44	6–2	Convocation Center (1,790); Ypsilanti, MI
12/15/2012*; 2:00 pm, CSNCHI	at UIC	L 48–74	6–3	UIC Pavilion (3,274); Chicago, IL
12/20/2012*; 8:30 pm, BTN	at No. 2 Michigan	L 54–93	6–4	Crisler Center (12,693); Ann Arbor, MI
12/22/2012*; 2:00 pm	Oakland	L 57–59	6–5	Convocation Center (830); Ypsilanti, MI
12/28/2012*; 4:00 pm	Siena Heights	W 87–49	7–5	Convocation Center (654); Ypsilanti, MI
01/02/2013*; 6:00 pm, ESPNU	at Kentucky	L 38–90	7–6	Rupp Arena (22,135); Lexington, KY
01/05/2013*; 2:00 pm	at Massachusetts	L 61–75	7–7	William D. Mullins Memorial Center (5,060); Amherst, MA
01/09/2013; 7:00 pm	Ball State	L 58–60	7–8 (0–1)	Convocation Center (826); Ypsilanti, MI
01/12/2013; 6:00 pm, ESPN3	at Bowling Green	L 44–46	7–9 (0–2)	Stroh Center (2,180); Bowling Green, OH
01/15/2013; 7:00 pm, ESPN3	Central Michigan	W 58–52	8–9 (1–2)	Convocation Center (N/A); Ypsilanti, MI
01/19/2013; 2:00 pm	Miami (OH)	W 65–58	9–9 (2–2)	Convocation Center (884); Ypsilanti, MI
01/23/2013; 7:00 pm	at Western Michigan	L 59–63	9–10 (2–3)	University Arena (2,419); Kalamazoo, MI
01/26/2013; 2:00 pm	Northern Illinois	W 42–25	10–10 (3–3)	Convocation Center (888); Ypsilanti, MI
02/02/2013; 6:00 pm, ESPN3	at Kent State	L 62–77	10–11 (3–4)	M.A.C. Center (2,267); Kent, OH
02/06/2013; 7:00 pm, ESPN3	Buffalo	W 65–46	11–11 (4–4)	Convocation Center (522); Ypsilanti, MI
02/09/2013; 7:00 pm	at Toledo	L 52–60	11–12 (4–5)	Savage Arena (4,252); Toledo, OH
02/13/2013; 7:00 pm	Akron	L 62–70	11–13 (4–6)	Convocation Center (672); Ypsilanti, MI
02/16/2013; 2:00 pm	at Ball State	W 56–50	12–13 (5–6)	John E. Worthen Arena (3,491); Muncie, IN
02/20/2013; 7:00 pm	at Ohio	L 50–73	12–14 (5–7)	Convocation Center (5,932); Athens, OH
02/23/2013*; 12:00 pm	Missouri State; BracketBusters	L 54–57	12–15	Convocation Center (676); Ypsilanti, MI
02/27/2013; 8:00 pm	at Northern Illinois	W 53–41	13–15 (6–7)	Convocation Center (826); DeKalb, IL
03/02/2013; 2:00 pm	Western Michigan	W 50–49 ^{OT}	14–15 (7–7)	Convocation Center (1,216); Ypsilanti, MI
03/05/2013; 7:00 pm	at Central Michigan	L 59–61	14–16 (7–8)	McGuirk Arena (879); Mount Pleasant, MI
03/09/2013; 12:00 pm	Toledo	L 67–78	14–17 (7–9)	Convocation Center (892); Ypsilanti, MI
2013 MAC men's basketball tournament
03/11/2013; 7:00 pm	Northern Illinois; First Round	W 45–44	15–17	Convocation Center (302); Ypsilanti, MI
03/13/2013; 9:00 pm, STO/ESPN3	vs. Miami (OH); Second Round	W 58–47	16–17	Quicken Loans Arena (2,147); Cleveland, OH
03/14/2013; 9:00 pm, STO/ESPN3	vs. Western Michigan; Quarterfinals	L 55–70	16–18	Quicken Loans Arena (3,361); Cleveland, OH
*Non-conference game. ^{#}Rankings from AP Poll. (#) Tournament seedings in parentheses. All times are in Eastern Time.

^ The game was originally scheduled for 1/30/2013 but was postponed due to the closure of the Ohio campus following an armed robbery of $5 just off campus.

=== Noteworthy games ===
The win over Purdue on December 8 was the program's first win over a Big Ten team in nearly 15 years.

The January 26 win over Northern Illinois set several NCAA defensive records, including lowest field goal percentage allowed in a half since the implementation of the shot clock (3.2%), fewest points allowed in a half (4 points), and lowest field goal percentage allowed in a game (13.1%).
