= 2012–13 Miami RedHawks men's basketball team =

American college basketball season

2012–13 Miami RedHawks men's basketball
- Conference: Mid-American Conference
- East Division
- Record: 9–22 (3–13 MAC)
- Head coach: John Cooper (1st season)
- Assistant coaches: Rick Duckett; Sheldon Everett; Trey Meyer
- Home arena: Millett Hall

2012–13 Mid-American Conference men's basketball standings
	Conf.				Overall
Team	W		L	PCT	W		L	PCT
East
Akron †	14	–	2	.875	26	–	7	.788
Ohio	14	–	2	.875	24	–	10	.706
Kent State	9	–	7	.563	21	–	14	.600
Buffalo	7	–	9	.438	14	–	20	.412
Bowling Green	7	–	9	.438	13	–	19	.406
Miami	3	–	13	.188	9	–	22	.290
West
Western Michigan	10	–	6	.625	22	–	13	.629
Toledo*	10	–	6	.625	15	–	13	.536
Ball State	8	–	8	.500	15	–	15	.500
Eastern Michigan	7	–	9	.438	16	–	18	.471
Central Michigan	4	–	12	.250	11	–	20	.355
Northern Illinois	3	–	13	.188	5	–	25	.167
† 2013 MAC tournament winner As of March 27, 2013; *Ineligible for postseason due to APR penalties Rankings from AP Poll

The 2012–13 Miami RedHawks men's basketball team represented Miami University during the 2012–13 NCAA Division I men's basketball season. The RedHawks, led by first year head coach John Cooper, played their home games at Millett Hall and were members of the East Division of the Mid-American Conference. They finished the season 9–22, 3–13 in MAC play to finish in last place in the East Division. They lost in the second round of the MAC tournament to Eastern Michigan.

This season was the first -and only- season to air on the Cincinnati radio station WCFN (now WOSL). It aired on "FM 100.3 The Fan" from its December 30 game vs. Wilmington, when the station launched its sports format, until the end of the season in March. WCFN returned to its rhythmic oldies, which it previously carried as WMOJ "Mojo 100.3" format 3 months later as WOSL "Old School 100.3", ending the broadcast of RedHawks basketball on 100.3.

== Roster ==
Number	Name	Position	Height	Weight	Year	Hometown
0	Geovonie McKnight	Guard	6–3	175	Freshman	Middletown, Ohio
1	Josh Sewell	Guard/Forward	6–5	202	Junior	Louisville, Kentucky
2	Quinten Rollins	Guard	6–0	185	Junior	Wilmington, Ohio
3	Allen Roberts	Guard	6–3	214	Junior	Middletown, Ohio
4	Reggie Johnson	Guard	6–1	200	Freshman	Chicago, Illinois
5	Joe Mezher	Guard	6–3	184	Sophomore	Cincinnati, Ohio
10	Jared Tadlock	Center	6–9	208	Sophomore	Conifer, Colorado
12	Bill Edwards	Forward	6–6	245	Junior	Middletown, Ohio
13	Will Sullivan	Guard	6–3	183	Sophomore	Elmhurst, Illinois
25	Ryan Hess	Guard	6–2	181	Sophomore	Westfield, New Jersey
33	Will Felder	Forward	6–7	202	Junior	Cleveland, Ohio
35	Jon Harris	Forward	6–8	206	Junior	Twinsburg, Ohio
40	John Hawkins	Center	7–0	260	Freshman	Troy, Michigan
50	Drew McGhee	Center	6–11	236	Junior	North Ridgeville, Ohio
55	Vince Legarza	Center	6–9	265	Senior	San Francisco, California

== Schedule ==
Date time, TV	Opponent	Result	Record	Site (attendance) city, state
Exhibition
10/31/2012*; 7:00 pm	Maryville	W 73–64		Millett Hall; Oxford, OH
Regular season
11/09/2012*; 7:00 pm, ESPN3	at No. 6 NC State	L 59–97	0–1	PNC Arena (19,065); Raleigh, NC
11/13/2012*; 7:00 pm	Grambling State	W 80–54	1–1	Millett Hall (1,708); Oxford, OH
11/18/2012*; 4:00 pm, ESPN3	at No. 2 Louisville	L 39–80	1–2	KFC Yum! Center (20,258); Louisville, KY
11/21/2012*; 7:00 pm	at William & Mary	W 72–59	2–2	William & Mary Hall (3,851); Williamsburg, VA
11/24/2012*; 12:00 pm	James Madison	W 76–58	3–2	Millett Hall (1,426); Oxford, OH
12/01/2012*; 7:00 pm	at IPFW	L 56–57	3–3	Allen County War Memorial Coliseum (3,033); Fort Wayne, IN
12/05/2012*; 8:05 pm	at Evansville	L 68–94	3–4	Ford Center (3,481); Evansville, IN
12/08/2012*; 8:05 pm	at Dayton	L 61–83	3–5	UD Arena (12,562); Dayton, OH
12/19/2012*; 8:00 pm	at Wright State	L 59–67	3–6	Nutter Center (3,470); Fairborn, OH
12/22/2012*; 1:30 pm	UIC	W 82–70	4–6	Millett Hall (1,122); Oxford, OH
12/30/2012*; 3:00 pm	Wilmington	W 84–67	5–6	Millett Hall (1,024); Oxford, OH
01/02/2013*; 7:00 pm	Massachusetts	L 69–70	5–7	Millett Hall (898); Oxford, OH
01/09/2013; 7:00 pm	Northern Illinois	L 61–72	5–8 (0–1)	Millett Hall (907); Oxford, OH
01/12/2013; 7:00 pm	at Buffalo	W 58–57	6–8 (1–1)	Alumni Arena (3,284); Amherst, NY
01/16/2013; 7:00 pm	Bowling Green	W 63–60	7–8 (2–1)	Millett Hall (1,405); Oxford, OH
01/19/2013; 2:00 pm	at Eastern Michigan	L 58–65	7–9 (2–2)	Eastern Michigan University Convocation Center (884); Ypsilanti, MI
01/23/2013; 7:00 pm, ESPN3	at Ohio	L 62–74	7–10 (2–3)	Millett Hall (2,202); Oxford, OH
01/26/2013; 3:00 pm	Ball State	L 62–82	7–11 (2–4)	Millett Hall (1,573); Oxford, OH
01/30/2013; 7:00 pm	Western Michigan	L 68–72	7–12 (2–5)	Millett Hall (1,206); Oxford, OH
02/02/2013; 7:00 pm	at Central Michigan	W 70–61	8–12 (3–5)	McGuirk Arena (2,253); Mount Pleasant, MI
02/06/2013; 7:00 pm	at Toledo	L 64–65	8–13 (3–6)	Savage Arena (3,711); Toledo, OH
02/09/2013; 1:00 pm, ESPNU	Akron	L 50–54	8–14 (3–7)	Millett Hall (1,698); Oxford, OH
02/13/2013; 7:00 pm, STO	at Kent State	L 70–87	8–15 (3–8)	MAC Center (2,289); Kent, OH
02/16/2013; 3:30 pm, ESPN3	Buffalo	L 71–79	8–16 (3–9)	Millett Hall (1,067); Oxford, OH
02/23/2013*; 3:05 pm	at Southern Illinois; BracketBusters	L 68–74 ^{OT}	8–17	SIU Arena (5,315); Carbondale, IL
02/27/2013; 7:00 pm	at Bowling Green	L 44–52	8–18 (3–10)	Stroh Center (1,589); Bowling Green, OH
03/02/2013; 3:00 pm	Kent State	L 58–78	8–19 (3–11)	Millett Hall (2,125); Oxford, OH
03/05/2013; 7:00 pm, ESPN3	at Akron	L 58–72	8–20 (3–12)	James A. Rhodes Arena (5,189); Akrom, OH
03/09/2013; 4:00 pm, STO/ESPN3	at Ohio	L 54–58	8–21 (3–13)	Convocation Center (8,428); Athens, OH
2013 MAC tournament
03/11/2013; 7:00 pm	at Bowling Green; First Round	W 63–52	9–21	Stroh Center (1,715); Bowling Green, OH
03/13/2013; 9:00 pm, STO/ESPN3	vs. Eastern Michigan; Second Round	L 47–58	9–22	Quicken Loans Arena (2,147); Cleveland, OH
*Non-conference game. ^{#}Rankings from AP Poll. (#) Tournament seedings in parentheses. All times are in Eastern Time.
