= 2012–13 Mid-American Conference men's basketball season =

- League: NCAA Division I
- Sport: Basketball
- Teams: 12

2012–13 NCAA Division I men's basketball season
- Regular season champions: Akron and Ohio
- Season MVP: D. J. Cooper

Tournament
- Champions: Akron
- Runners-up: Ohio
- Finals MVP: Demetrius Treadwell

Basketball seasons
- 2011–12 2013–14

2012–13 Mid-American Conference men's basketball standings
	Conf.				Overall
Team	W		L	PCT	W		L	PCT
East
Akron †	14	–	2	.875	26	–	7	.788
Ohio	14	–	2	.875	24	–	10	.706
Kent State	9	–	7	.563	21	–	14	.600
Buffalo	7	–	9	.438	14	–	20	.412
Bowling Green	7	–	9	.438	13	–	19	.406
Miami	3	–	13	.188	9	–	22	.290
West
Western Michigan	10	–	6	.625	22	–	13	.629
Toledo*	10	–	6	.625	15	–	13	.536
Ball State	8	–	8	.500	15	–	15	.500
Eastern Michigan	7	–	9	.438	16	–	18	.471
Central Michigan	4	–	12	.250	11	–	20	.355
Northern Illinois	3	–	13	.188	5	–	25	.167
† 2013 MAC tournament winner As of March 27, 2013; *Ineligible for postseason due to APR penalties Rankings from AP Poll

The 2012–13 Mid-American Conference men's basketball season is the 67th college basketball season in the conference's existence. The conference features 12 teams in two divisions, East and West, who competed for the Mid-American Conference (MAC) regular season and tournament titles. Akron and Ohio shared the regular season title with 14-2 records in conference play. Akron won both games with Ohio but lost two late season games. Akron was the top-seed in the tournament and defeated Ohio in the final. D. J. Cooper of Ohio was voted as the MAC player of the year.

== Pre-season ==
=== Media voting ===
On October 29, the members of the MAC News Media Panel voted in the Preseason Media Poll. They voted Ohio as the favorite in the MAC East Division and Toledo in the MAC West Division.

East Division
Place	Team	1st	Points
1	Ohio Bobcats	19	141 points
2	Akron Zips	5	122 points
3	Kent State Golden Flashes	-	89 points
4	Buffalo Bulls	–	53 points
5	Bowling Green Falcons	-	54 points
6	Miami RedHawks	–	31 points

West Division
Place	Team	1st	Points
1	Toledo Rockets	20	143 points
2	Eastern Michigan Eagles	4	118 points
3	Western Michigan Broncos	-	88 points
4	Ball State Cardinals	4	74 points
5	Northern Illinois Huskies	-	46 points
6	Central Michigan Chippewas	–	35 points

The media also took a vote on who they think would win the MAC tournament at the end of the season. Unlike the preseason votes, the media would only select the winner of the tournament, and not the placement of the teams afterwards. Ohio received the most votes with 18, followed by Akron with six votes.

=== Exhibition schedule ===
Date	Time	Team	Conference	MAC Team	Location	Television	Attendance	Winner
Fri., Oct. 26	7:00 pm	Northwestern Ohio	Wolverine–Hoosier Athletic Conference	Toledo	Savage Arena • Toledo, OH			Toledo (75–52)
Wed., Oct. 31	7:00 pm	Triffin	Great Lakes Intercollegiate Athletic Conference	Akron	James A. Rhodes Arena • Akron, OH		2,683	Akron (111–72)
Wed., Oct. 31	7:00 pm	Maryville	USA South Athletic Conference	Miami	Millett Hall • Oxford, OH			Miami (73–64)
Thu., Nov. 1	2:00 pm	Kalamazoo	Michigan Intercollegiate Athletic Association	Western Michigan	University Arena • Kalamazoo, MI		1,927	Western Michigan (93–50)
Fri., Nov. 2	7:30 pm	Michigan-Dearborn	Wolverine–Hoosier Athletic Conference	Eastern Michigan	Convocation Center • Ypsilanti, MI			Eastern Michigan (82–38)
Sat., Nov. 3	2:00 pm	Mercyhurts	Pennsylvania State Athletic Conference	Ohio	Convocation Center • Athens, OH		4,613	Ohio (82–42)
Sat., Nov. 3	2:00 pm	Roosevelt	Chicagoland Collegiate Athletic Conference	Western Michigan	University Arena • Kalamazoo, MI		1,777	Western Michigan (81–60)
Sat., Nov. 3	5:00 pm	Malone	Great Lakes Intercollegiate Athletic Conference	Akron	James A. Rhodes Arena • Akron, OH		2,454	Akron (106–67)
Sat., Nov. 3	7:00 pm	Aurora	Northern Athletics Conference	Northern Illinois	Convocation Center • DeKalb, IL		1,005	Northern Illinois (89–56)
Sun., Nov. 4	2:00 pm	Central State	Independent	Bowling Green	Stroh Center • Bowling Green, OH		1,249	Bowling Green (73–60)
Sun., Nov. 4	7:00 pm	Rochester	National Association of Intercollegiate Athletics	Kent State	M.A.C. Center • Kent, OH	STO		Kent State (77–71)
Wed., Nov. 7	7:00 pm	Lake Superior State	Great Lakes Intercollegiate Athletic Conference	Central Michigan	McGuirk Arena • Mount Pleasant, MI		1,569	Central Michigan (86–76)

*All Times Eastern

== Regular season ==
=== Conference schedules ===
This table summarizes the head-to-head results between teams in conference play. Teams play opponents in their division twice, once at home and once away. Teams play opponents outside of their division once a season. (x) indicates games remaining this season.

	Akron	Ball State	Bowling Green	Buffalo	Central Michigan	Eastern Michigan	Kent State	Miami	Northern Illinois	Ohio	Toledo	Western Michigan
vs. Akron	–	0-1	0-2	1-1	0-1	0-1	1-1	0-2	0–1	0–2	0–1	0–1
vs. Ball State	1–0	–	1-0	1-0	1-1	1–1	1-1	1-0	1–1	0–2	1-1	0-2
vs. Bowling Green	2-0	0-1	–	1–1	1–0	0–1	1–1	1-1	1–0	2-0	1–0	0–1
vs. Buffalo	0–2	2–0	0–1	–	1–1	0–1	0–1	0–2	1–1	1–1	0–2	1–0
vs. Central Michigan	0–1	2–0	0–1	1–1	–	1–1	0–2	0–1	1–1	0–1	0–2	0–2
vs. Eastern Michigan	1–1	1–1	1–1	1–0	1–1	–	1–1	1–1	1–0	0–1	1–0	1–1
vs. Kent State	2–0	1–0	1–1	1–0	2–0	1–1	–	0–1	2–0	0–2	1–0	2–0
vs. Miami	1–1	1–0	2–0	2–0	1–0	1–1	1–0	–	2–0	1–1	1–1	1–0
vs. Northern Illinois	1–1	1–1	0–1	1–1	1–1	0–1	0–2	0–2	–	0–1	0–1	1–1
vs. Ohio	1–0	2–0	2–0	1–1	1–0	1–0	2–0	1–1	1–0	–	2–0	2–0
vs. Toledo	1–1	2–0	1–1	2–0	2–0	0–1	0–1	1–1	1–0	0–2	–	0–1
vs. Western Michigan	0–2	0–1	1–1	0–1	2–0	1–1	0–2	0–1	1–1	0–2	1–0	–
Total	14-2	8-8	7–9	7-9	4-12	7-9	9-7	3–13	3-13	14-2	10-6	10–6

=== BracketBusters ===
Date	Time	Team	Conference	MAC Team	Location	Television	Attendance	Winner
Fri., Feb. 22	7:00 pm	North Dakota State	The Summit League	Akron	James A. Rhodes Arena • Akron, OH	ESPN2	4,474	Akron (68–53)
Sat., Feb. 23	12:00 pm	Missouri State	Missouri Valley Conference	Eastern Michigan	Convocation Center • Ypsilanti, MI		676	Missouri State (54–57)
Sat., Feb. 23	1:00 pm	Pacific	Big West Conference	Western Michigan	University Arena • Kalamazoo, MI	ESPN3	3,172	Western Michigan (67–66)
Sat., Feb. 23	2:00 pm	Manhattan	Metro Atlantic Athletic Conference	Buffalo	Savage Arena • Toledo, OH		4,393	Toledo (79–66)
Sat., Feb. 23	2:00 pm	McNeese State	Southland Conference	Toledo	Alumni Arena • Amherst, NY		3,172	Manhattan (64–65)
Sat., Feb. 23	3:00 pm	Loyola-Chicago	Horizon League	Kent State	Joseph J. Gentile Arena • Chicago, IL		1,945	Kent State (70–63)
Sat., Feb. 23	3:00 pm	Eastern Illinois	Ohio Valley Conference	Northern Illinois	Convocation Center • DeKalb, IL		1,009	Eastern Illinois (47–59)
Sat., Feb. 23	3:05 pm	Southern Illinois	Missouri Valley Conference	Miami	SIU Arena • Carbondale, IL		5,315	Southern Illinois (68-74 OT)
Sat., Feb. 23	6:30 pm	Southeast Missouri State	Ohio Valley Conference	Ball State	Show Me Center • Cape Girardeau, MO		2,484	Ball State (85–82)
Sat., Feb. 23	7:00 pm	IFPW	The Summit League	Bowling Green	Allen County War Memorial Coliseum • Fort Wayne, IN		1,577	IFPW (75–88)
Sat., Feb. 23	7:05 pm	Youngstown State	Horizon League	Central Michigan	Beeghly Center • Youngstown, OH		2,710	Youngstown (75–86)
Sat., Feb. 23	10:00 pm	Belmont	Ohio Valley Conference	Ohio	Curb Event Center • Nashville, TN	ESPN2	4,813	Belmont (62–81)

*All Times Eastern

== Post-season tournaments ==
=== MAC Tournament ===
The 2013 MAC tournament only had 11 teams due to Toledo being ineligible for post season play due to low APR Scores. The Semifinals and Championship Game were held at Quicken Loans Arena.

Semifinals; Friday, March 15
1	Akron	62
4	Kent State	59
2	Ohio	74
3	Western Michigan	63

Championship Game; Saturday, March 16
1	Akron	65
2	Ohio	46

=== NCAA Tournament ===
Seed	Region	Berth type	School	Round of 64
12	South	Automatic	Akron	Eliminated by VCU 42–88

=== National Invitation Tournament ===
Seed	Bracket	Berth type	School	First Round
6	Alabama	At-large	Ohio	Eliminated by Denver 57–61

=== College Basketball Invitational ===
School	First Round	Quarterfinals	Semifinals
Western Michigan	Defeated North Dakota State 72-71 OT	Defeated Wyoming 75-67 OT	Eliminated by George Mason 52–62

=== CollegeInsider.com Postseason Tournament ===
School	First Round	Second Round
Kent State	Defeated Fairfield 73–71	Eliminated by Loyola (MD) 59–73

== Awards ==
=== All-MAC Preseason Team ===
As a part of the Preseason Media Poll, the members also voted on the Preseason All-MAC East and West Division teams. Ohio and Toledo had two players in the East and West Division polls, respectively.

East Division All-MAC Preseason Team
Player	School
Zeke Marshall	Akron
A'uston Calhoun	Bowling Green
Javon McCrea	Buffalo
Walter Offutt	Ohio
D. J. Cooper	Ohio

West Division All-MAC Preseason Team
Player	School
DJesse Berry	Ball State
Abdel Nader	Northern Illinois
Rian Pearson	Toledo
Julius Brown	Toledo
Nate Hutcheson	Western Michigan

=== Player of the Week ===
East Division Player of the Week
Week	Player	School
1	Chris Evans	Kent State
2	Zeke Marshall	Akron
3	Chris Evans (2); Walter Offutt	Kent State; Ohio
4	Chris Evans (3)	Kent State
5	Will Regan	Buffalo
6	Demetrius Treadwell	Akron
7	D. J. Cooper	Ohio
8	Zeke Marshall (2)	Akron
9	D. J. Cooper (2)	Ohio
10	D. J. Cooper (3)	Ohio
11	Javon McCrea	Buffalo
12	Zeke Marshall(3); D. J. Cooper (4)	Akron; Ohio

West Division Player of the Week
Week	Player	School
1	Jesse Berry	Ball State
2	Nate Hutcheson	Western Michigan
3	Rian Pearson	Toledo
4	Shayne Whittington	Western Michigan
5	Rian Pearson (2); Majok Majok	Toledo; Ball State
6	Kyle Randall	Central Michigan
7	Shayne Whittington (2)	Western Michigan
8	Rian Pearson (3)	Toledo
9	Jesse Berry (2)	Ball State
10	Julius Brown	Toledo
11	Shayne Whittington (3)	Western Michigan
12	Majok Majok (2)	Ball State

=== All-MAC Teams ===
All-MAC First Team
Player	Pos.	School
Zeke Marshall	C	Akron
Javon McCrea	F	Buffalo
Chris Evans	W/F	Kent State
Rian Pearson	G	Toledo
D. J. Cooper	G	Ohio

All-MAC Second Team
Player	Pos.	School
Demetrius "Tree" Treadwell	F	Akron
Jauwan Scaife	G	Ball State
A'uston Calhoun	F	Bowling Green
Kyle Randall	G	Central Michigan
Shayne Whittington	F/C	Western Michigan

All-MAC Freshman Team
Player	Pos.	School
Jake Kretzer	G/F	Akron
Jarryn Skeete	G	Buffalo
Chris Fowler	G	Central Michigan
Nathan Boothe	C	Toledo
Darius Paul	F	Western Michigan

Source: MAC Announces Men's Basketball All-MAC, All-Freshman Teams

== See also ==
- 2012–13 Mid-American Conference women's basketball season
