= 2012–13 Ohio Bobcats men's basketball team =

American college basketball season

2012–13 Ohio Bobcats men's basketball

MAC Regular Season Co-Champions MAC East Division Co-Champions

NIT, First Round
- Conference: Mid-American Conference
- East Division
- Record: 24–10 (14–2 MAC)
- Head coach: Jim Christian (1st season)
- Assistant coaches: Bull Wuczynski; Anthony Stewart; Aaron Fuss
- Home arena: Convocation Center

2012–13 Mid-American Conference men's basketball standings
	Conf.				Overall
Team	W		L	PCT	W		L	PCT
East
Akron †	14	–	2	.875	26	–	7	.788
Ohio	14	–	2	.875	24	–	10	.706
Kent State	9	–	7	.563	21	–	14	.600
Buffalo	7	–	9	.438	14	–	20	.412
Bowling Green	7	–	9	.438	13	–	19	.406
Miami	3	–	13	.188	9	–	22	.290
West
Western Michigan	10	–	6	.625	22	–	13	.629
Toledo*	10	–	6	.625	15	–	13	.536
Ball State	8	–	8	.500	15	–	15	.500
Eastern Michigan	7	–	9	.438	16	–	18	.471
Central Michigan	4	–	12	.250	11	–	20	.355
Northern Illinois	3	–	13	.188	5	–	25	.167
† 2013 MAC tournament winner As of March 27, 2013; *Ineligible for postseason due to APR penalties Rankings from AP Poll

The 2012–13 Ohio Bobcats men's basketball team represented Ohio University during the 2012–13 NCAA Division I men's basketball season. The Bobcats, led by first year head coach Jim Christian, played their home games at the Convocation Center and were members of the East Division of the Mid-American Conference. They finished the season 24–10, 14–2 in the East Division to claim a share of the East Division and MAC regular season championship with Akron. They lost in the championship game of the MAC tournament to Akron. They were invited to the 2013 NIT where they lost in the first round to Denver.

The Ohio University Bobcat fans continued to show support for the team leading the MAC in fan attendance for the 7th time in the last 8 seasons, averaging just under 7,000 fans attending each game.

== Roster ==
2012–13 Ohio Bobcats men's basketball team
Players
Coaches

Pos.	#	Name	Height	Weight	Year	Hometown
F	0	Treg Setty	6 ft 9 in (2.06 m)	194 lb (88 kg)	So	Maysville, Kentucky
F	1	Kadeem Green	6 ft 8 in (2.03 m)	210 lb (95 kg)	So	Toronto, Ontario, Canada
G	2	Nick Goff	6 ft 2 in (1.88 m)	183 lb (83 kg)	Jr	Columbus, Ohio
G	3	Walter Offutt	6 ft 4 in (1.93 m)	202 lb (92 kg)	Sr	Indianapolis, Indiana
G	4	David McKinley	5 ft 10 in (1.78 m)	171 lb (78 kg)	Sr	Dublin, Ohio
G	5	D. J. Cooper	6 ft 0 in (1.83 m)	176 lb (80 kg)	Sr	Chicago, Illinois
G	10	Javarez Willis	6 ft 0 in (1.83 m)	173 lb (78 kg)	Jr	Homer, Louisiana
F	13	T.J. Hall	6 ft 5 in (1.96 m)	210 lb (95 kg)	Jr	Gainesville, Florida
G	15	Nick Kellogg	6 ft 3 in (1.91 m)	201 lb (91 kg)	Jr	Westerville, Ohio
G	20	Ricardo Johnson	6 ft 5 in (1.96 m)	207 lb (94 kg)	Jr	Covington, Kentucky
F	21	Jon Smith	6 ft 6 in (1.98 m)	187 lb (85 kg)	Jr	Grove City, Ohio
G	22	Stevie Taylor	5 ft 10 in (1.78 m)	163 lb (74 kg)	So	Gahanna, Ohio
F	23	Ivo Baltic	6 ft 9 in (2.06 m)	214 lb (97 kg)	Sr	Kansas City, Missouri
G	24	Travis Wilkins	6 ft 4 in (1.93 m)	192 lb (87 kg)	Jr	Springfield, Missouri
F	30	Reggie Keely	6 ft 8 in (2.03 m)	239 lb (108 kg)	Sr	University Heights, Ohio
F/C	45	Kenny Belton	6 ft 8 in (2.03 m)	203 lb (92 kg)	Sr	Greensboro, North Carolina

Head coach

Jim Christian

Assistant coach(es)

Bill Wuczynski
Anthony Stewart
Aaron Fuss

Legend

- (C) Team captain
- (S) Suspended
- (I) Ineligible
- (W) Walk-on
- Injured
- Current redshirt

== Preseason ==
=== Media voting ===
On October 29, the members of the MAC News Media Panel voted in the Preseason Media Poll. Ohio was the favorite in the MAC East and the MAC tournament.

East Division
Place	Team	1st	Points
1	Ohio Bobcats	19	141 points
2	Akron Zips	5	122 points
3	Kent State Golden Flashes	-	89 points
4	Buffalo Bulls	–	53 points
5	Bowling Green Falcons	-	54 points
6	Miami RedHawks	–	31 points

West Division
Place	Team	1st	Points
1	Toledo Rockets	20	143 points
2	Eastern Michigan Eagles	4	118 points
3	Western Michigan Broncos	-	88 points
4	Ball State Cardinals	4	74 points
5	Northern Illinois Huskies	-	46 points
6	Central Michigan Chippewas	–	35 points

==== Tournament champs ====
Ohio (18), Akron (6)

=== Preseason All-MAC ===
Preseason All-MAC teams
Team	Player	Position	Year
Preseason All-MAC East	DJ Cooper	G	Sr.
Preseason All-MAC East	Walter Offutt	G	Sr.

== Schedule ==
Date time, TV	Opponent	Result	Record	Site (attendance) city, state
Exhibition
11/03/2012*; 2:00 pm	Mercyhurst	W 82–42		Convocation Center (4,613); Athens, OH
Regular Season
11/10/2012*; 2:00 pm	Portland	W 81–52	1–0	Convocation Center (12,194); Athens, OH
11/16/2012*; 7:00 pm	UNC Wilmington	W 85–47	2–0	Convocation Center (6,317); Athens, OH
11/18/2012*; 2:00 pm	Wofford	W 73–50	3–0	Convocation Center (4,718); Athens, OH
11/20/2012*; 7:00 pm	Hampton	W 75–67	4–0	Convocation Center (4,087); Athens, OH
11/24/2012*; 2:00 pm	Richmond	W 73–48	5–0	Convocation Center (4,211); Athens, OH
11/28/2012*; 7:00 pm	St. Bonaventure	W 69–64	6–0	Convocation Center (6,389); Athens, OH
12/01/2012*; 7:00 pm	at Robert Morris	L 76–84	6–1	Charles L. Sewall Center (1,163); Moon Township, PA
12/05/2012*; 7:00 pm, CBSSN	at Memphis	L 58–84	6–2	FedExForum (15,669); Memphis, TN
12/08/2012*; 2:00 pm	Oakland	W 78–61	7–2	Convocation Center (5,346); Athens, OH
12/15/2012*; 2:00 pm	Winthrop	L 49–50	7–3	Convocation Center (5,421); Athens, OH
12/19/2012*; 7:50 pm	at Massachusetts	L 76–85	7–4	Mullins Center (3,821); Amherst, MA
12/22/2012*; 2:00 pm	Maryland–Eastern Shore	W 93–57	8–4	Convocation Center (4,448); Athens, OH
12/29/2012*; 8:00 pm	at Oklahoma	L 63–74	8–5	Lloyd Noble Center (10,036); Norman, OK
01/05/2013*; 2:00 pm	Marshall	W 94–57	9–5	Convocation Center (6,971); Athens, OH
MAC regular season
01/09/2013; 7:00 pm, STO/ESPN3	Buffalo	W 86–68	10–5 (1–0)	Convocation Center (4,846); Athens, OH
01/12/2013; 2:00 pm	at Western Michigan	W 61–59	11–5 (2–0)	University Arena (3,229); Kalamazoo, MI
01/16/2013; 7:00 pm	Northern Illinois	W 81–63	12–5 (3–0)	Convocation Center (7,648); Athens, OH
01/19/2013; 6:00 pm, STO/ESPN3	Toledo	W 76–67	13–5 (4–0)	Convocation Center (7,388); Athens, OH
01/23/2013; 7:00 pm, ESPN3	at Miami (OH)	W 74–62	14–5 (5–0)	Millett Hall (2,202); Oxford, OH
01/26/2013; 6:00 pm, STO/ESPN3	at Kent State	W 69–68	15–5 (6–0)	MAC Center (5,453); Kent, OH
02/02/2013; 5:00 pm, ESPNU	at Akron	L 72–86	15–6 (6–1)	James A. Rhodes Arena (5,770); Akron, OH
02/06/2013; 7:00 pm	at Ball State	W 69–42	16–6 (7–1)	John E. Worthen Arena (3,114); Muncie, IN
02/09/2013; 2:00 pm	Bowling Green	W 72–63	17–6 (8–1)	Convocation Center (10,846); Athens, OH
02/13/2013; 7:00 pm	at Central Michigan	W 82–63	18–6 (9–1)	McGuirk Arena (1,211); Mount Pleasant, MI
02/16/2013; 11:00 am, ESPNU	Kent State	W 78–75 ^{OT}	19–6 (10–1)	Convocation Center (8,483); Athens, OH
02/20/2013 ^ 7:00 pm	Eastern Michigan	W 73–50	20–6 (11–1)	Convocation Center (5,932); Athens, OH
02/23/2013*; 10:00 pm, ESPN2	at Belmont; BracketBusters	L 62–81	20–7	Curb Event Center (4,813); Nashville, TN
02/27/2013; 7:00 pm, STO	Akron	L 81–88 ^{OT}	20–8 (11–2)	Convocation Center (11,109); Athens, OH
03/02/2013; 12:00 pm, STO/ESPN3	at Bowling Green	W 78–65	21–8 (12–2)	Stroh Center (2,662); Bowling Green, OH
03/05/2013; 7:00 pm, TWCS	at Buffalo	W 72–69	22–8 (13–2)	Alumni Arena (3,132); Amherst, NY
03/09/2013; 4:00 pm, STO/ESPN3	Miami (OH)	W 58–54	23–8 (14–2)	Convocation Center (8,428); Athens, OH
MAC tournament
03/15/2013; 9:00 pm, STO/ESPN3	vs. Western Michigan; Semifinals	W 74–63	24–8	Quicken Loans Arena (10,324); Cleveland, OH
03/16/2013; 6:30 pm, ESPN2	vs. Akron; Championship Game	L 46–65	24–9	Quicken Loans Arena (12,102); Cleveland, OH
NIT
03/19/2013*; 9:15 pm, ESPN3	at Denver; First Round	L 57–61	24–10	Magness Arena (2,094); Denver, CO
*Non-conference game. ^{#}Rankings from AP Poll. (#) Tournament seedings in parentheses. All times are in Eastern Time.

^ Game was originally scheduled for 1/30/2013, but was postponed due to the closure of the Ohio campus following an armed robbery near the university.

== Statistics ==
=== Team statistics ===
Final 2012–13 statistics

Record	Ohio	OPP
Scoring	2464	2192
Scoring Average	72.47	64.47
Field goals – Att	889–1908	743–1747
3-pt. Field goals – Att	268–764	172–520
Free throws – Att	418–598	534–801
Rebounds	948	1206
Assists	594	408
Turnovers	430	591
Steals	303	220
Blocked Shots	120	91

=== Player statistics ===
			Minutes		Scoring		Total FGs			3-point FGs			Free-Throws			Rebounds								
Player	GP	GS	Tot	Avg	Pts	Avg	FG	FGA	Pct	3FG	3FA	Pct	FT	FTA	Pct	Off	Def	Tot	Avg	A	PF	TO	Stl	Blk
D.J. Cooper	34	33	1075	31.6	480	14.1	150	354	0.424	76	209	0.364	104	148	0.703	15	94	109	3.2	242	53	119	68	6
Reggie Keely	34	23	788	23.2	412	12.1	162	270	0.6	1	5	0.2	87	129	0.674	50	102	152	4.5	24	80	42	26	27
Walter Offutt	34	33	1043	30.7	360	10.6	116	274	0.423	47	140	0.336	81	102	0.794	35	108	143	4.2	70	87	54	45	3
Nick Kellogg	34	32	870	25.6	272	8	92	220	0.418	54	160	0.338	34	43	0.791	7	64	71	2.1	48	61	40	35	3
Ivo Baltic	34	20	861	25.3	237	7	111	237	0.468	10	30	0.333	5	13	0.385	34	137	171	5	70	69	71	37	21
Jon Smith	34	10	555	16.3	162	4.8	65	107	0.607	0	0	0	32	45	0.711	58	65	123	3.6	10	87	10	25	47
T.J. Hall	32	11	432	13.5	154	4.8	57	134	0.425	23	77	0.299	17	26	0.654	16	34	50	1.6	28	88	31	14	2
Ricardo Johnson	33	2	411	12.5	116	3.5	40	91	0.44	6	19	0.316	30	49	0.612	27	46	73	2.2	36	62	27	14	6
Stevie Taylor	34	0	339	10	106	3.1	39	105	0.371	21	56	0.375	7	13	0.538	5	14	19	0.6	41	35	21	21	2
Travis Wilkins	30	0	365	12.2	103	3.4	34	80	0.425	23	55	0.418	12	18	0.667	2	19	21	0.7	20	29	5	13	0
Kadeem Green	12	0	64	5.3	35	2.9	15	20	0.75	0	0	0	5	7	0.714	2	10	12	1	0	14	2	1	3
David McKinley	15	1	26	1.7	17	1.1	6	7	0.857	5	5	1	0	0	0	0	2	2	0.1	1	3	0	3	0
Nick Goff	14	0	21	1.5	10	0.7	2	9	0.222	2	8	0.25	4	5	0.8	1	1	2	0.1	4	1	0	1	0
Total	34	-	6850	-	2464	72.5	889	1908	0.466	268	764	0.351	418	598	0.699	305	643	948	27.9	594	669	430	303	120
Opponents	34	-	6850	-	2192	64.5	743	1747	0.425	172	520	0.331	534	801	0.667	397	809	1206	35.5	408	581	591	220	91

Legend
GP	Games played	GS	Games started	Avg	Average per game
FG	Field-goals made	FGA	Field-goal attempts	Off	Offensive rebounds
Def	Defensive rebounds	A	Assists	TO	Turnovers
Blk	Blocks	Stl	Steals	High	Team high

== Awards and honors ==
=== All-MAC Awards ===
Postseason All-MAC teams
Team	Player	Position	Year
MAC Player of the Year	DJ Cooper	G	Sr.
All-MAC First Team	DJ Cooper	G	Sr.
All-MAC Third Team	Walter Offutt	G	Sr.
All-MAC Third Team	Reggie Keely	F	Sr.

=== Final awards watchlists ===
Final award honors watchlist
Honors	Player	Position	Year	Source
Lou Henson National Player of the Year	DJ Cooper	G	Sr.	
