= 2013 MAC men's basketball tournament =

- 2013 MAC Tournament logo
- Classification: Division I
- Season: 2012–13
- Teams: 11
- Site: Quicken Loans Arena; Cleveland, Ohio
- Champions: Akron Zips (3rd title)
- Winning coach: Keith Dambrot (3rd title)
- MVP: Demetrius Treadwell (Akron)
- Attendance: 12,102
- Television: STO and ESPN2
- MAC men's basketball tournaments

2012–13 Mid-American Conference men's basketball standings
| | Conf. | | | | Overall |
| Team | W | | L | PCT | W | | L | PCT |
|---|---|---|---|---|---|---|---|---|
East
| Akron † | 14 | – | 2 | .875 | 26 | – | 7 | .788 |
| Ohio | 14 | – | 2 | .875 | 24 | – | 10 | .706 |
| Kent State | 9 | – | 7 | .563 | 21 | – | 14 | .600 |
| Buffalo | 7 | – | 9 | .438 | 14 | – | 20 | .412 |
| Bowling Green | 7 | – | 9 | .438 | 13 | – | 19 | .406 |
| Miami | 3 | – | 13 | .188 | 9 | – | 22 | .290 |
West
| Western Michigan | 10 | – | 6 | .625 | 22 | – | 13 | .629 |
| Toledo* | 10 | – | 6 | .625 | 15 | – | 13 | .536 |
| Ball State | 8 | – | 8 | .500 | 15 | – | 15 | .500 |
| Eastern Michigan | 7 | – | 9 | .438 | 16 | – | 18 | .471 |
| Central Michigan | 4 | – | 12 | .250 | 11 | – | 20 | .355 |
| Northern Illinois | 3 | – | 13 | .188 | 5 | – | 25 | .167 |
† 2013 MAC tournament winner As of March 27, 2013; *Ineligible for postseason due to APR penalties Rankings from AP Poll

The 2013 Mid-American Conference men's basketball tournament was the post-season men's basketball tournament for the Mid-American Conference (MAC) 2012–13 college basketball season. The 2013 tournament was held between March 11–16, 2013. Akron, as the winner of the tournament received the MAC's automatic bid into the 2013 NCAA tournament.

== Format ==
The 2013 MAC tournament only had 11 teams due to Toledo being ineligible for post season play due to low APR Scores. First round games were held on campus sites at the higher seed on March 11. The remaining rounds were held at Quicken Loans Arena, between March 13–16. As with the 2012 tournament, the top two seeds (Akron and Ohio, respectively) received byes into the semifinals, with the three seed (Western Michigan) and four seed (Kent State) receiving a bye to the quarterfinals. No. 5 Ball State received a first round bye.

=== Tournament seeding ===
| Seed | School | Record | Tiebreaker |
|---|---|---|---|
| #1 | Akron | 14–2 | 2–0 head-to-head |
| #2 | Ohio | 14–2 | 0–2 head-to-head |
| #3 | Western Michigan | 10–6 | |
| #4 | Kent State | 9–7 | |
| #5 | Ball State | 8–8 | |
| #6 | Bowling Green | 7–9 | 2–1 head-to-head |
| #7 | Eastern Michigan | 7–9 | 1–1 head-to-head |
| #8 | Buffalo | 7–9 | 1–2 head-to-head |
| #9 | Central Michigan | 4–12 | |
| #10 | Northern Illinois | 3–13 | 1–0 head-to-head |
| #11 | Miami | 3–13 | 0–1 head-to-head |

== Schedule ==
| Game | Time* | Matchup^{#} | Television |
First Round – Monday, March 11
| 1 | 7:00 pm | #8 Buffalo vs. #9 Central Michigan | |
| 2 | 7:00 pm | #7 Eastern Michigan vs. #10 Northern Illinois | |
| 3 | 6:00 pm | #6 Bowling Green vs. #11 Miami | |
Second Round – Wednesday, March 13
| 4 | 6:30 pm | #5 Ball State vs. #8 Buffalo | STO |
| 5 | 9:00 pm | #7 Eastern Michigan vs. #11 Miami | STO |
Quarterfinals – Thursday, March 14
| 6 | 6:30 pm | #4 Kent State vs. #8 Buffalo | STO |
| 7 | 9:00 pm | #3 Western Michigan vs. #7 Eastern Michigan | STO |
Semifinals – Friday, March 15
| 8 | 6:30 pm | #1 Akron vs. #4 Kent State | STO |
| 9 | 9:00 pm | #2 Ohio vs. #3 Western Michigan | STO |
Championship Game – Saturday, March 16
| 10 | 6:30 pm | #1 Akron vs. #2 Ohio | ESPN2 |
* Game times in ET. # Rankings denote tournament seed

== Bracket ==
First round Monday, March 11, 2012
9 | Central Michigan | 72
8 | Buffalo | 74*
11 | Miami (OH) | 63
6 | Bowling Green | 52
10 | Northern Illinois | 44
7 | Eastern Michigan | 45

Second round Wednesday, March 13, 2012; STO
5 | Ball State | 61
8 | Buffalo | 76
11 | Miami (OH) | 47
7 | Eastern Michigan | 58

Quarterfinals; Thursday, Match 14, 2012; STO
4 | Kent State | 70
8 | Buffalo | 68
3 | Western Michigan | 70
7 | Eastern Michigan | 55

Semifinals; Friday, March 15, 2012; STO
1 | Akron | 62
4 | Kent State | 59
2 | Ohio | 74
3 | Western Michigan | 63

Championship Game; Saturday, March 16, 2012; ESPN2
1 | Akron | 65
2 | Ohio | 46
