= Convocation Center (Northern Illinois University) =

University arena

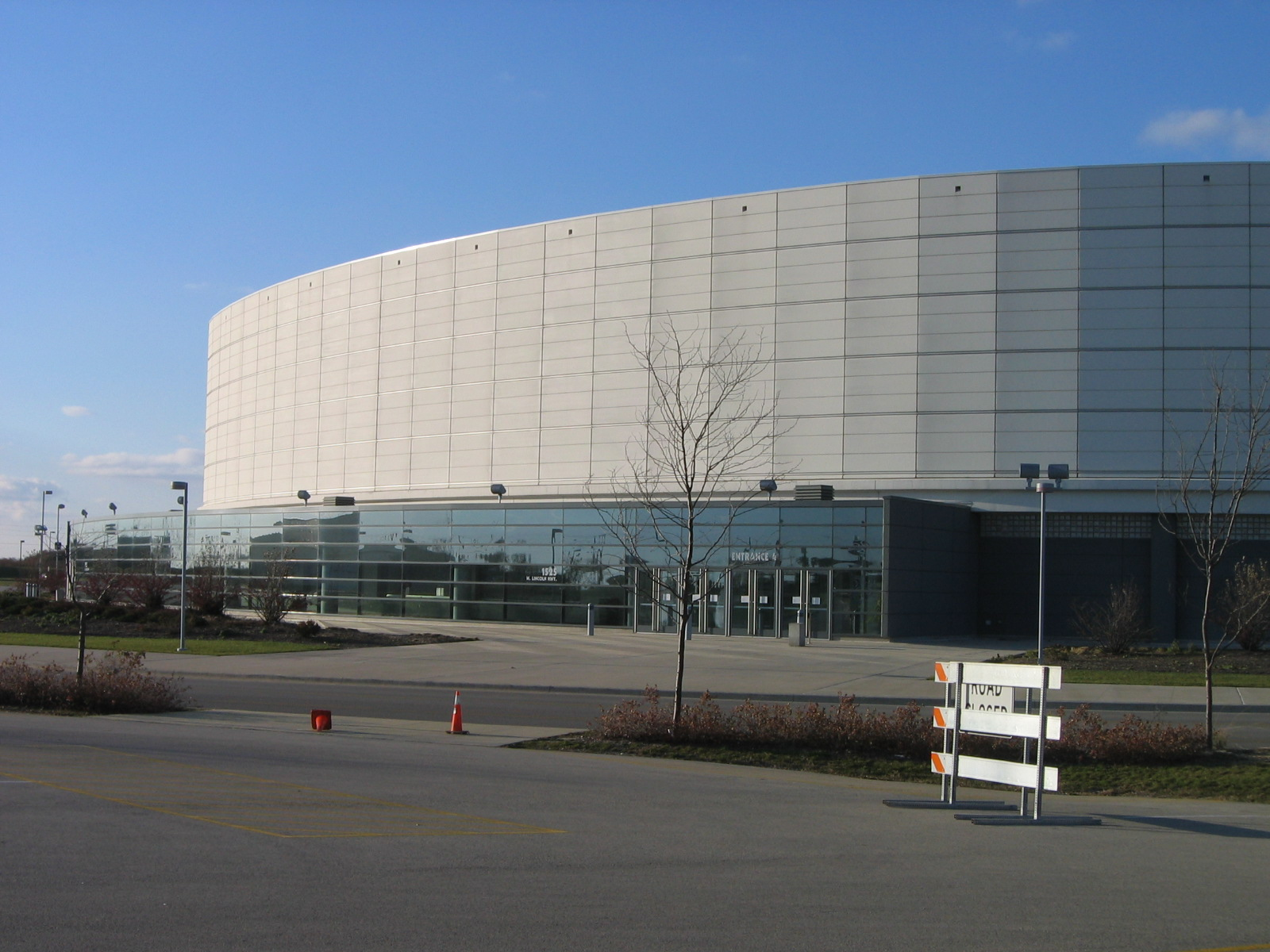
- Interactive map of Convocation Center
- Location: 1525 West Lincoln Highway; DeKalb, Illinois, 60115-2854, US
- Coordinates: 41°56′6.38″N 88°47′8.05″W
- Owner: Northern Illinois University
- Operator: Northern Illinois University
- Capacity: 10,000
- Surface: Hardwood
- Public transit: DeKalb Public Transit

Construction
- Groundbreaking: 2000
- Opened: August 30, 2002
- Cost: $36 million ($64.4 million in 2025 dollars)
- Architects: A. Epstein & Sons International
- General contractor: Turner Construction

Tenants
- NIU men's basketball (2002–present); NIU women's basketball (2002–present)

Northern Illinois University's Convocation Center is a 10,000-seat multi-purpose arena, at 1525 W Lincoln Hwy, in DeKalb, Illinois, US. The arena opened in 2002. The Convocation Center is home to both the Northern Illinois Huskies men's basketball and women's basketball teams, volleyball, wrestling, gymnastics, and women's indoor track and field squads. Previously, the basketball teams played at the Chick Evans Field House. The Convocation Center also houses many other events including the opening convocation ceremony for freshmen, concerts, job fairs, expositions, and the annual graduation ceremony.

The first Northern Illinois athletic event in the new facility happened on August 30, 2002, when the Huskies women's volleyball team defeated IUPUI, 3–1, in the opening round of the Best Western Invitational at Victor E. Court.

Entertainers that have performed at the center include Bob Dylan (from Minnesota), Bill Cosby, Blue Man Group, Brooks & Dunn, Daughtry in 2012, Sheryl Crow (from Missouri) in 2013, Drake, Dave Chappelle, Sugarland, Goo Goo Dolls, 3 Doors Down, Carrie Underwood, Josh Turner, Chamillionaire, Chingy (from STL), Rascal Flatts (from Ohio), Michelle Branch, John Mayer, Wayne Brady, O.A.R., Hoobastank, Ludacris (from Illinois, in 2003), Ashlee Simpson, Jason Aldean, REO Speedwagon (from Champaign), Ja Rule, Counting Crows, Jimmy Eat World with Paramore, B.B. King, 311 (from Omaha), Cheap Trick (from Rockford), Joan Jett, Cedric the Entertainer (from STL), Larry the Cable Guy (from Nebraska), Nelly and St. Lunatics in 2005, Ciara, Dierks Bentley, Kanye West (from Oak Lawn, Illinois, in 2005), Twista (from Chicago, in 2005.) Lupe Fiasco (from Chicago, in 2011), Kid Cudi (from Cleveland) in 2013, Incubus, Staind, Big & Rich, Three Days Grace, Casting Crowns, Styx (from Chicago) with Kansas, Jars of Clay (from IL), Gretchen Wilson (from Illinois), Brett Eldredge (from Illinois), Garrison Keillor (from Minnesota), Sesame Street Live, Young Jeezy, T.I., and T-Pain. Saliva with Trapt and other bands in 2016. Thomas Rhett with Kelsea Ballerini in 2017. The Daily Show host Trevor Noah in 2019, Young the Giant in 2019, and Lauren Alaina in 2023.

The arena was also the site of a memorial service held on February 24, 2008, in tribute to the victims of the Northern Illinois University shooting. Bon Jovi was scheduled to rehearse at the arena beginning February 14, 2008, prior to the start of the North American leg of their Lost Highway Tour on February 18 in Omaha, but was forced to start the tour without rehearsals due to the NIU shooting and the subsequent closure of the campus.

A county-wide meeting of Jehovah's Witnesses takes place here yearly during the second weekend of August.
