= Bracket buster =

Term in American college basketball

Bracket buster, as a generic phrase, refers to an American college basketball team, usually from a so-called mid-major school, which upsets a highly ranked team in the NCAA Division I men's basketball tournament and to a lesser extent, the NCAA Division I women's basketball tournament.

The tournament schedule is set up as a single-elimination "bracket" format. When the tournament's selection committee announces the teams that are invited to play and the schedule of the games, fans will try to guess the outcome of as many games as possible by filling out the bracket form for each round. This is often accompanied by gambling on the outcome of these predictions; this often takes the form of an informal pool where participants stake a certain amount of money, and the most successful predictor wins the pooled stakes. When a lightly regarded mid-major team upsets a traditional powerhouse team, the result often knocks out subsequent predictions of many players in these informal pools, who are said to have had their brackets busted—hence, the term "bracket buster."

There are numerous examples of bracket buster teams over the years of the NCAA Tournament, even dating back before the tournament came to be the widespread cultural event that it is today. One early example is the March 18, 1971 Mideast Regional game in which Western Kentucky defeated its better-known in-state "big brother," Kentucky, 107–83. The game was more significant to hoops fans in the Bluegrass State, as the Kentucky Wildcats and coach Adolph Rupp had steadfastly refused to play any other in-state schools (including Louisville) in regular season games, so the game itself was very significant no matter the outcome. The Hilltoppers later advanced to the Final Four.

As the tournament field expanded to the now-familiar six-round bracket and 68 teams (including 4 play-in games), "bracket busters" became more of a phenomenon. One notable example is George Mason and its improbable run to the Final Four in the 2006 tournament. Bradley was another example in the same tournament, having been assigned the 13th seed in their region, only to upset Kansas and Pitt to reach the "Sweet 16" round, where the Braves were finally ousted by top-seeded Memphis.

The 2010 tournament featured many bracket busters. In the second round, a ten seed (St. Mary's) defeated a two seed (Villanova) while Northern Iowa, a nine seed, defeated the overall top seed, Kansas. In ESPN's bracket challenge, over 42% picked Kansas to win the tournament, making Northern Iowa's upset one of the biggest in many years.

== ESPN BracketBusters ==
As the phrase became more popular, ESPN decided to capitalize on the phenomenon with the concept of ESPN BracketBusters. The cable television network worked with a group of non-money conferences, including the Colonial Athletic, Horizon, Mid-American, Missouri Valley, and Western Athletic, to stage a series of games where potential bracket-buster teams would play each other late in the regular season outside of conference play. The idea was to give these non-power conference schools more exposure to national audiences than they would otherwise get, and boost their chances of being selected for the NCAA Tournament.

The first series began in 2003 (it was labeled Bracket Buster Saturday for the initial three offerings), where 18 teams played on one Saturday. The matchups for these games was left open as late as possible, in order to determine the most likely teams to benefit. The concept proved greatly successful, and the 2006 edition of ESPN BracketBusters—with corporate sponsorship by eBay—featured 100 different teams playing over multiple days. So many teams were involved that fewer than half the games were actually televised on the ESPN family of networks. The 2007 and 2008 editions had O'Reilly as the title sponsor. The 2012 edition had Sears as the title sponsor. The 2013 edition had Ramada Worldwide as the title sponsor.

In 2006, two teams that were matched up in an ESPN BracketBusters game—Wichita State and George Mason—later faced each other in the NCAA Tournament Sweet Sixteen round.

In December 2012 ESPN announced that they would discontinue the BracketBusters event following the February 2013 offering.
