= SportsTime Ohio =

Regional sports network in northeast Ohio, United States (2006-2025)

- The network's logo before Fox ownership as SportsTime Ohio.
- Country: United States
- Broadcast area: Cleveland/Northern Ohio; Central Ohio; Northwestern Pennsylvania; Southwest New York; National (via satellite)
- Network: FanDuel Sports Network
- Headquarters: Cleveland, Ohio, U.S.

Programming
- Language: English
- Picture format: 720p (HDTV); 480i (SDTV)

Ownership
- Owner: Main Street Sports Group
- Sister channels: FanDuel Sports Network Ohio

History
- Launched: March 12, 2006 (20 years ago)
- Closed: March 1, 2025
- Replaced by: MLB Local Media (Guardians coverage)
- Former names: SportsTime Ohio (2006–2021); Bally Sports Great Lakes (2021–2024); FanDuel Sports Network Great Lakes (2024–2025)

Links
- Website: www.fanduelsportsnetwork.com/ohio-greatlakes/

SportsTime Ohio was an American regional sports network which was last known as Bally Sports Great Lakes. At the time it left the air, the network was owned by Main Street Sports Group (formerly Diamond Sports Group) and operated as an affiliate of FanDuel Sports Network in its final days as FanDuel Sports Network Great Lakes. The channel, which was a sister network to FanDuel Sports Network Ohio, broadcast statewide coverage of professional, collegiate and high school sports events throughout Northeast Ohio, including Cleveland.

The network available from most cable providers in the region, and select providers in other portions of Ohio (including Columbus), Northwest Pennsylvania, and extreme Western New York. It was also available nationwide on satellite via DirecTV, as well as outside Ohio on AT&T U-verse with game coverage pre-empted.

== History ==
The channel was launched on March 12, 2006, as SportsTime Ohio; it was founded by the family of Cleveland Indians owner Larry Dolan, becoming the second regional sports network in the Cleveland area, after Fox Sports Ohio (which launched in February 1989 as SportsChannel Ohio). SportsTime Ohio assumed the regional cable television rights to Major League Baseball games involving the Indians from Fox Sports Ohio, which had served as the exclusive local broadcaster of the Indians from 2002 to 2005, when it was majority-owned by Cablevision Systems Corporation (a New York-based company owned by Dolan's brother, Charles) until an asset trade with then-Fox Sports Net parent News Corporation who also owned 20th Century Fox and Fox News. Jim Liberatore, former President of Fox Sports owned Speed Channel helped start the network and served as its first President. His knowledge of the cable industry served a vital role in the success the network enjoyed while so many other team facilitated network launches failed across the country.

Starting off as rivals with Gannett-owned WKYC providing studio operations for the cable channel, the two networks would soon become corporate sisters, when on December 3, 2012, the Indians announced that it would sell SportsTime Ohio to Fox Sports Ohio parent Fox Entertainment Group. The deal was finalized four weeks later on December 28. Fox retained SportsTime Ohio's existing staff despite coming under common ownership with Fox Sports Ohio, with Katie Witham becoming a traveling reporter with the team. Now under new ownership, the network became a member of Fox Sports Networks.

In April 2013, at the beginning of the 2013 Major League Baseball season, SportsTime Ohio transitioned to the Fox Sports branding and imagery, but maintained the SportsTime Ohio branding (following the model of FSN's similar secondary channels Sun Sports, SportSouth, and Prime Ticket).

Former logo as Bally Sports Great Lakes from 2021 to 2024

On December 14, 2017, as part of a merger between both companies, The Walt Disney Company announced plans to acquire all 22 regional Fox Sports networks from 21st Century Fox, including SportsTime Ohio, sister network Fox Sports Ohio, and Fox's 50% stake in the network's Cincinnati sub-feed. However, on June 27, 2018, the Justice Department ordered their divestment under antitrust grounds, citing Disney's ownership of ESPN. On May 3, 2019, Sinclair Broadcast Group and Entertainment Studios (through their joint venture, Diamond Holdings) bought Fox Sports Networks from The Walt Disney Company for $10.6 billion. The deal closed on August 22, 2019, thus putting SportsTime Ohio and Fox Sports Ohio under common ownership with several Sinclair stations in Ohio and Pennsylvania (though none in Cleveland itself).

On November 17, 2020, Sinclair announced an agreement with casino operator Bally's Corporation to serve as a new naming rights partner for the FSN channels. Sinclair announced the new Bally Sports branding for the channels on January 27, 2021. On March 31, 2021, coinciding with the start of the 2021 Major League Baseball season, SportsTime Ohio was rebranded as Bally Sports Great Lakes, with all other former Fox Sports Networks also rebranded as "Bally Sports" accompanied by a regional description appropriate for each network. The first live sporting event to air on Bally Sports Great Lakes under the Bally banner was the opening-day coverage of the Indians visiting the Tigers on April 1, which was preceded up by the Indians Live pregame show.

=== Bankruptcy and closure ===
The network's logo as FanDuel Sports Network Great Lakes in its final months without any local teams to broadcast.

On February 15, 2023, Diamond Sports Group, the owner of Bally Sports Great Lakes, failed to make a $140 million interest payment, instead opting for a 30-day grace period to make the payment. On March 14, 2023, Diamond Sports Group filed for Chapter 11 bankruptcy protection.

During its bankruptcy, Diamond missed a payment to the Cleveland Guardians. On April 5, 2023, Major League Baseball, on behalf of the Guardians, filed an emergency motion asking the bankruptcy judge to order Diamond to pay the Guardians fully or give its media rights back to the MLB. Diamond argued that because of cord-cutting the contract rate for the media rights of the teams was too high. A hearing on the matter was set for May 31, 2023. As an interim, on April 19, the bankruptcy judge ordered Diamond Sports to pay 50% of what the Guardians were owed. On June 1, 2023, after a two day long hearing, the bankruptcy judge ordered Diamond to pay the Guardians fully within five days.

On October 16, 2024, it was revealed in a court filing that Diamond had reached a new sponsorship agreement with FanDuel Group, under which it intended to rebrand Bally Sports as the FanDuel Sports Network; on October 18, 2024, Diamond officially announced the rebranding, which took effect on October 21. Though Bally Sports Great Lakes did take on a new name on-air as FanDuel Sports Network Great Lakes for its last few months, it never originated any local sports coverage under the name, as the Guardians season ended two days before with their loss in the 2024 ALCS. The team had already moved to distribution through MLB Local Media on October 9 starting with the 2025 season, as Diamond did not renew their agreement as part of the bankruptcy.

On March 1, 2025, FanDuel Sports Network Great Lakes was shut down with a message saying "Thank you for your loyal viewership over the years. Please check your local listings to access broadcasts of the Cleveland Guardians".

== Programming ==
=== Professional sports ===
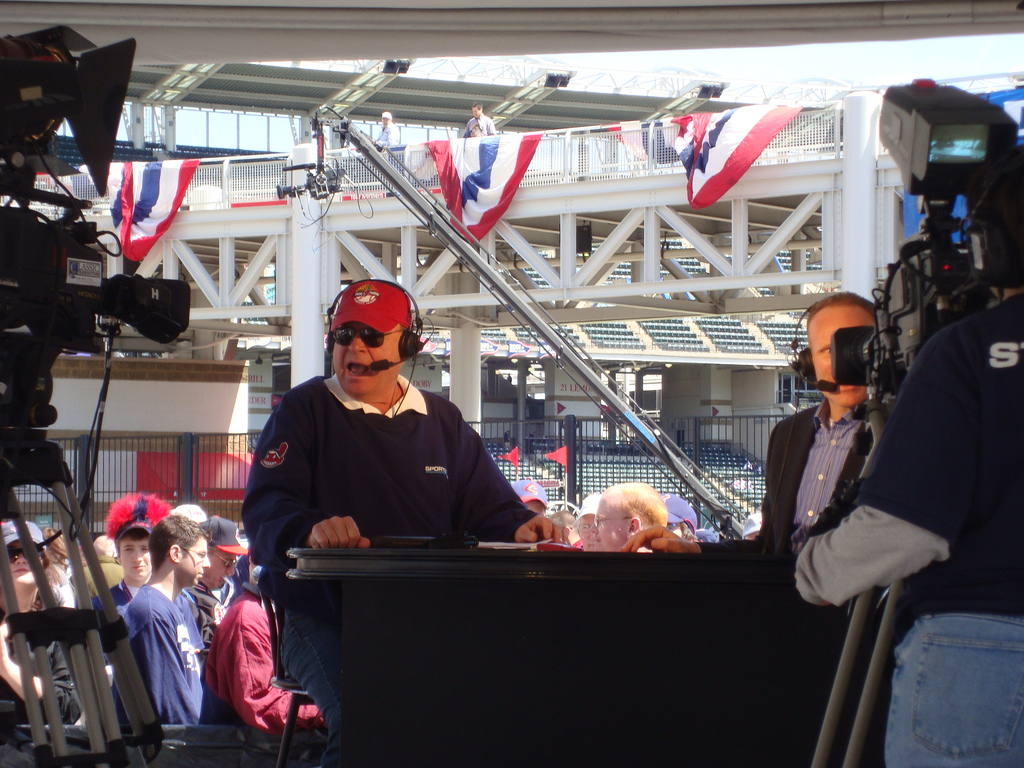
Bruce Drennan, who hosted a daily afternoon call-in show on the network from 2007 to 2021.

FanDuel Sports Network Great Lakes held the exclusive regional cable television rights to the Cleveland Guardians of Major League Baseball from 2006 to 2024, when the Guardians announced a new deal with MLB Local Media. It is also the pay-TV outlet of the Cleveland Browns. The network was the primary TV outlet for Cleveland Monsters hockey until 2024, with a new deal with Gray Television and was a secondary broadcaster of Columbus Crew soccer.

=== Former programming ===
- Training Camp Daily - a daily 30 minute program which aired during Browns training camp
- Red Zone - A weekly Cleveland Browns oriented program
- Swing Clinic – a golf instructional show hosted by local PGA pro Jimmy Hanlin; is a part of the national Bally Sports Networks schedule
- 18 Holes – a tour of various national golf courses hosted by Jimmy Hanlin and former LPGA golfer Natalie Gulbis; is a part of the national Fanduel Sports Network schedule.
- Guardians Live, a pre-game and post-game show bookending the channel's Guardians telecasts or any national games airing on another network.
- The Guardians Report – A weekly show reviewing the previous week's Guardians games and headlines, and previewing upcoming team games and events.

== Former on-air staff ==
- Jock Callander
- Jim Donovan
- Tony Grossi
- Jensen Lewis
- Rick Manning
- Matt Underwood
- Al Pawlowski
- Andre Knott
