= 2012–13 VMI Keydets basketball team =

American college basketball season

2012–13 VMI Keydets men's basketball
- Conference: Big South Conference
- North Division
- Record: 14–17 (8–8 Big South)
- Head coach: Duggar Baucom (8th season)
- Assistant coaches: Daniel Willis (8th season); Ryan Mattocks (1st season); Jason Allison (8th season)
- Home arena: Cameron Hall

2012–13 Big South men's basketball standings
	Conf.				Overall
Team	W		L	PCT	W		L	PCT
North
High Point	12	–	4	.750	17	–	14	.548
VMI	8	–	8	.500	14	–	17	.452
Radford	7	–	9	.438	13	–	19	.406
Campbell	7	–	9	.438	13	–	20	.394
Liberty †	6	–	10	.375	15	–	21	.417
Longwood	4	–	12	.250	8	–	25	.242
South
Charleston Southern	12	–	4	.750	19	–	13	.594
Gardner–Webb	11	–	5	.688	21	–	13	.618
UNC Asheville	10	–	6	.625	16	–	16	.500
Coastal Carolina	9	–	7	.563	14	–	15	.483
Winthrop	6	–	10	.375	14	–	17	.452
Presbyterian	4	–	12	.250	8	–	24	.250
† 2013 Big South tournament winner As of March 20, 2013; Rankings from AP Poll

The 2012–13 VMI Keydets basketball team represented the Virginia Military Institute in the 2012–13 NCAA Division I men's basketball season. The Keydets were coached by Duggar Baucom, in his 8th year. They played their home games at the 5,800 seat Cameron Hall. They were a member of the North Division of the Big South Conference. They finished the season 14–17, 8–8 in Big South play to finish in second place in the North Division. They advanced to the semifinals of the Big South tournament where they fell to Charleston Southern.

== Roster ==
2012–13 VMI Keydets men's basketball team
Players
Coaches

Pos.	#	Name	Height	Weight	Year	Hometown
G	1	Rodney Glasgow Jr.	5 ft 10 in (1.78 m)	170 lb (77 kg)	Jr	Olney, MD
G	3	Brian Brown	5 ft 11 in (1.8 m)	185 lb (84 kg)	So	Kings Mountain, NC
G	4	Christian Burton	5 ft 10 in (1.78 m)	170 lb (77 kg)	So	Virginia Beach, VA
G	5	Drew Absher	5 ft 10 in (1.78 m)	170 lb (77 kg)	Jr	Mocksville, NC
F	11	Stan Okoye	6 ft 5 in (1.96 m)	205 lb (93 kg)	Sr	Raleigh, NC
G	12	Gavin Stephenson	6 ft 3 in (1.91 m)	185 lb (84 kg)	Fr	Columbia, MD
G	14	Joe Carr	6 ft 3 in (1.91 m)	195 lb (88 kg)	Sr	Houston, TX
F	23	Dorian Albritton (injured)	6 ft 4 in (1.93 m)	210 lb (95 kg)	Fr	Bronx, NY
F/C	24	D. J. Covington	6 ft 9 in (2.06 m)	235 lb (107 kg)	Jr	Virginia Beach, VA
F	30	Nick Gore	6 ft 6 in (1.98 m)	220 lb (100 kg)	Sr	Waynesboro, VA
F	32	Phillip Anglade	6 ft 5 in (1.96 m)	21 lb (10 kg)	Fr	Long Island, NY
C	34	Jarid Watson	6 ft 7 in (2.01 m)	210 lb (95 kg)	So	Burtonsville, MD
G	35	Tim Marshall	6 ft 3 in (1.91 m)	185 lb (84 kg)	Fr	Virginia Beach, VA
F	40	Jordan Weethee (redshirt)	6 ft 6 in (1.98 m)	220 lb (100 kg)	So	Greensboro, NC

Head coach

- Duggar Baucom

Assistant coach(es)

- Daniel Willis
- Jason Allison
- Ryan Mattocks

Legend

- (C) Team captain
- (S) Suspended
- (I) Ineligible
- (W) Walk-on
- Injured
- Current redshirt

== Schedule ==
Date time, TV	Opponent	Result	Record	Site (attendance) city, state
Exhibition
November 3*; 7:00 pm	Frostburg State	W 115–60		Cameron Hall; Lexington, VA
Regular season
November 10*; 4:00 pm	vs. The Citadel; All-Military Classic semifinals	L 76–84	0–1	McAlister Field House (1,180); Charleston, SC
November 11*; 2:00 pm	vs. Army; All-Military Classic	L 74–80	0–2	McAlister Field House (N/A); Charleston, SC
November 13*; 7:00 pm	Central Pennsylvania	W 116–81	1–2	Cameron Hall (570); Lexington, VA
November 15*; 7:00 pm, ESPN3	at Virginia Tech	L 80–95	1–3	Cassell Coliseum (6,883); Blacksburg, VA
November 21*; 7:00 pm	at Old Dominion	W 76–71	2–3	Ted Constant Convocation Center (6,801); Norfolk, VA
November 24*; 5:00 pm	Elon	W 90–81	3–3	Cameron Hall (1,272); Lexington, VA
November 28*; 7:00 pm, ESPN3/Root	at West Virginia	L 69–94	3–4	WVU Coliseum (7,531); Morgantown, WV
December 1*; 1:00 pm	Morgan State	L 80–81 ^{OT}	3–5	Cameron Hall (2,684); Lexington, VA
December 3*; 7:00 pm	Virginia-Lynchburg	W 102–61	4–5	Cameron Hall (549); Lexington, VA
December 8*; 7:00 pm	at Wright State	L 59–92	4–6	Nutter Center (3,500); Fairborn, OH
December 22*; 3:00 pm	at George Washington	L 67–76	4–7	Charles E. Smith Athletic Center (1,753); Washington, D.C.
January 2*; 7:00 pm	Shenandoah	W 110–54	5–7	Cameron Hall (540); Lexington, VA
January 5; 7:00 pm	at Presbyterian	W 86–77	6–7 (1–0)	Templeton Center (862); Clinton, SC
January 9; 7:00 pm, ESPN3	Liberty	W 82–69	7–7 (2–0)	Cameron Hall (1,068); Lexington, VA
January 12; 1:00 pm	Winthrop	W 72–54	8–7 (3–0)	Cameron Hall (1,235); Lexington, VA
January 16; 7:00 pm	Campbell	W 76–57	9–7 (4–0)	Cameron Hall (2,234); Lexington, VA
January 19; 11:00 am, ESPNU	at Coastal Carolina	L 49–72	9–8 (4–1)	HTC Center (2,419); Conway, SC
January 23; 7:00 pm	at High Point	L 69–96	9–9 (4–2)	Millis Center (1,306); High Point, NC
January 26; 1:00 pm	Gardner–Webb	L 49–63	9–10 (4–3)	Cameron Hall (3,320); Lexington, VA
January 30; 7:00 pm	at Radford	W 70–69	10–10 (5–3)	Dedmon Center (1,522); Radford, VA
February 6; 7:00 pm	at Longwood	W 93–60	11–10 (6–3)	Willett Hall (1,536); Farmville, VA
February 8; 7:00 pm, ESPNU	UNC Asheville	L 79–90	11–11 (6–4)	Cameron Hall (4,117); Lexington, VA
February 13; 7:00 pm	Radford	L 79–82	11–12 (6–5)	Cameron Hall (1,172); Lexington, VA
February 16; 2:00 pm	at Campbell	L 78–87	11–13 (6–6)	John W. Pope, Jr. Convocation Center (2,258); Buies Creek, NC
February 19; 7:00 pm	High Point	L 67–78	11–14 (6–7)	Cameron Hall (962); Lexington, VA
February 21; 7:50 pm	Charleston Southern	L 69–92	11–15 (6–8)	Cameron Hall (871); Lexington, VA
February 23*; 7:00 pm	at Marist; Bracketbusters	L 74–112	11–16	McCann Field House (1,254); Poughkeepsie, NY
February 26; 7:00 pm, ESPN3	at Liberty	W 83–66	12–16 (7–8)	Vines Center (2,198); Lynchburg, VA
March 2; 1:00 pm	Longwood	W 94–80	13–16 (8–8)	Cameron Hall (2,311); Lexington, VA
2013 Big South Conference men's basketball tournament
03/07/2013; 2:25 pm	vs. Longwood; Quarterfinals	W 90–86	14–16	HTC Center (2,105); Conway, SC
03/09/2013; 12:00 pm, ESPN3	vs. Charleston Southern; Semifinals	L 65–71	14–17	HTC Center (2,598); Conway, SC
*Non-conference game. ^{#}Rankings from AP Poll. (#) Tournament seedings in parentheses. All times are in Eastern Time.
