= 2012–13 Longwood Lancers men's basketball team =

American college basketball season

2012–13 Longwood Lancers men's basketball
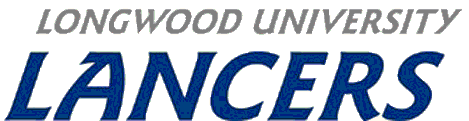

Big South Quarterfinals, L 86–90 vs. VMI
- Conference: Big South Conference
- North Division
- Record: 8–25 (4–12 Big South)
- Head coach: Mike Gillian (10th season)
- Assistant coaches: Doug Thibault (10th season); Tim Fudd (6th season); Ricky Yahn (2nd season)
- Home arena: Willett Hall

2012–13 Big South men's basketball standings
	Conf.				Overall
Team	W		L	PCT	W		L	PCT
North
High Point	12	–	4	.750	17	–	14	.548
VMI	8	–	8	.500	14	–	17	.452
Radford	7	–	9	.438	13	–	19	.406
Campbell	7	–	9	.438	13	–	20	.394
Liberty †	6	–	10	.375	15	–	21	.417
Longwood	4	–	12	.250	8	–	25	.242
South
Charleston Southern	12	–	4	.750	19	–	13	.594
Gardner–Webb	11	–	5	.688	21	–	13	.618
UNC Asheville	10	–	6	.625	16	–	16	.500
Coastal Carolina	9	–	7	.563	14	–	15	.483
Winthrop	6	–	10	.375	14	–	17	.452
Presbyterian	4	–	12	.250	8	–	24	.250
† 2013 Big South tournament winner As of March 20, 2013; Rankings from AP Poll

The 2012–13 Longwood Lancers men's basketball team represented Longwood University during the 2012–13 NCAA Division I men's basketball season. The Lancers, led by tenth year head coach Mike Gillian, played their home games at Willett Hall and were members of the North Division of the Big South Conference. This was the Lancers first season in the Big South. They finished the season 8–25, 4–12 in Big South play to finish in last place in the North Division. They lost in the quarterfinals of the Big South tournament to VMI; the tournament constituted Longwood's first postseason appearance as a Division I school.

Following the season, Head Coach Mike Gillian stepped down from his duties as Head Coach of Longwood University. He led the team through their transition to Division I and posted a record of 94–215 in ten seasons. He was replaced by Cleveland State associate head coach Jayson Gee.

== Last season ==
The Lancers had a record of 10–21 in their final season as a Division I independent school.

== Roster ==
2012–13 Longwood Lancers men's basketball team
Players
Coaches

Pos.	#	Name	Height	Weight	Year	Previous school	Hometown
G	1	Nik Brown	6 ft 3 in (1.91 m)	200 lb (91 kg)	Fr	Middleburg	Ashburn, VA
G	2	Lucas Woodhouse	6 ft 1 in (1.85 m)	155 lb (70 kg)	Fr	Harborfields	Greenlawn, NY
G	3	Anthony Taylor	6 ft 2 in (1.88 m)	210 lb (95 kg)	RS So	Egg Harbor Township	Egg Harbor Township, NJ
G	10	Stephen Shockley	6 ft 0 in (1.83 m)	185 lb (84 kg)	Sr	Heritage High School	Leesburg, VA
G	12	Tristan Carey	6 ft 4 in (1.93 m)	185 lb (84 kg)	RS Jr	Colonial Beach/La Salle	Colonial Beach, VA
G	13	David Robinson	6 ft 4 in (1.93 m)	190 lb (86 kg)	Jr	Cosby	Chesterfield, VA
F	14	Michael Kessens	6 ft 9 in (2.06 m)	205 lb (93 kg)	Fr	Lycee Europe Robert Schumann	Nyon, Switzerland
F	20	Karl Ziegler	6 ft 5 in (1.96 m)	205 lb (93 kg)	Fr	Fishburne	Annandale, VA
G/F	21	Mark Parker	6 ft 7 in (2.01 m)	214 lb (97 kg)	Jr	West Johnston	Clayton, NC
F	22	Jaylani Dublin	6 ft 6 in (1.98 m)	225 lb (102 kg)	RS So	Millbrook	Brooklyn, NY
F	30	Frank Holloway	6 ft 6 in (1.98 m)	250 lb (113 kg)	So	Robert E. Lee/Garrett College	Alexandria, VA
F	35	Kirk Staine	6 ft 6 in (1.98 m)	175 lb (79 kg)	Fr	Baldwin	Baldwin, NY
F	44	Jeff Havenstein	6 ft 8 in (2.03 m)	225 lb (102 kg)	Jr	Linganore	Mt. Airy, MD

Head coach

- Mike Gillian (North Adams State)

Assistant coach(es)

- Doug Thibault (Boise State)
- Tim Fudd (American)
- Ricky Yahn (Wheeling Jesuit)

Legend

- (C) Team captain
- (S) Suspended
- (I) Ineligible
- (W) Walk-on
- Injured
- Current redshirt

Roster
Last update: 10 December 2014

== Schedule ==
Date time, TV	Opponent	Result	Record	Site (attendance) city, state
Regular season
11/09/2012*; 7:30 pm	at Marshall	L 47–81	0–1	Cam Henderson Center (5,472); Huntington, WV
11/15/2012*; 7:00 pm	Norfolk State	L 66–78	0–2	Willett Hall (1,723); Farmville, VA
11/18/2012*; 4:00 pm	at Arkansas; Las Vegas Invitational	L 63–112	0–3	Bud Walton Arena (5,835); Fayetteville, AR
11/20/2012*; 8:00 pm, ESPN3	at No. 14 Creighton; Las Vegas Invitational	L 57–105	0–4	CenturyLink Center Omaha (15,826); Omaha, NE
11/23/2012*; 2:00 pm	vs. Florida A&M; Las Vegas Invitational	W 86–83 ^{OT}	1–4	Orleans Arena (200); Paradise, NV
11/24/2012*; 5:30 pm	vs. Cornell; Las Vegas Invitational	L 78–84	1–5	Orleans Arena (200); Paradise, NV
11/28/2012*; 7:00 pm	Central Pennsylvania	W 88–75	2–5	Willett Hall (989); Farmville, VA
12/01/2012*; 2:00 pm	Dartmouth	L 53–61	2–6	Willett Hall (1,112); Farmville, VA
12/10/2012*; 7:00 pm, MASN/ESPN3	at No. 15 Georgetown	L 53–89	2–7	Verizon Center (5,283); Washington, D.C.
12/13/2012*; 7:00 pm	Southern Virginia	W 86–74	3–7	Willett Hall (313); Farmville, VA
12/17/2012*; 7:00 pm	at Canisius	L 54–82	3–8	Koessler Athletic Center (1,205); Buffalo, NY
12/19/2012*; 7:00 pm	at Seton Hall	L 61–79	3–9	Prudential Center (6,215); Newark, NJ
12/21/2012*; 7:30 pm	at VCU	L 56–93	3–10	Stuart C. Siegel Center (7,693); Richmond, VA
12/31/2012*; 2:00 pm	Fairleigh Dickinson	L 71–79	3–11	Willett Hall (431); Farmville, VA
01/05/2013; 2:00 pm	Coastal Carolina	L 72–80	3–12 (0–1)	Willett Hall (655); Farmville, VA
01/09/2013; 7:00 pm	Campbell	L 73–83	3–13 (0–2)	Willett Hall (409); Farmville, VA
01/12/2013; 2:00 pm, ESPN3	Charleston Southern	L 62–75	3–14 (0–3)	Willett Hall (1,012); Farmville, VA
01/16/2013; 7:00 pm	at Radford	L 72–82	3–15 (0–4)	Dedmon Center (764); Radford, VA
01/19/2013; 4:30 pm	at UNC Asheville	L 65–68	3–16 (0–5)	Kimmel Arena (2,415); Asheville, NC
01/22/2013; 7:00 pm, ESPN3	at Liberty	L 47–74	3–17 (0–6)	Vines Center (2,106); Lynchburg, VA
01/26/2013; 2:00 pm	Presbyterian	L 71–82	3–18 (0–7)	Willett Hall (1,466); Farmville, VA
01/30/2013; 7:00 pm	at High Point	L 60–88	3–19 (0–8)	Millis Center (1,127); High Point, NC
02/02/2013; 7:00 pm	at Gardner–Webb	L 65–76	3–20 (0–9)	Paul Porter Arena (2,109); Boiling Springs, NC
02/06/2013; 7:00 pm	VMI	L 60–93	3–21 (0–10)	Willett Hall (1,536); Farmville, VA
02/09/2013; 4:00 pm	at Winthrop	W 62–56	4–21 (1–10)	Winthrop Coliseum (1,830); Rock Hill, SC
02/13/2013; 7:00 pm	High Point	L 53–82	4–22 (1–11)	Willett Hall (873); Farmville, VA
02/16/2013; 2:00 pm	Radford	W 76–61	5–22 (2–11)	Willett Hall (1,787); Farmville, VA
02/19/2013; 7:00 pm, ESPN3	Liberty	W 102–101	6–22 (3–11)	Willett Hall (1,693); Farmville, VA
02/23/2013*; 1:00 pm	at Tennessee–Martin; BracketBusters	L 79–89	6–23	Skyhawk Arena (894); Martin, TN
02/27/2013; 7:00 pm	at Campbell	W 79–66	7–23 (4–11)	John W. Pope, Jr. Convocation Center (1,048); Buies Creek, NC
03/02/2013; 1:00 pm	at VMI	L 80–94	7–24 (4–12)	Cameron Hall (2,311); Lexington, VA
Big South tournament
03/05/2013; 2:45 pm	vs. UNC Asheville; First Round	W 87–72	8–24	HTC Center (1,858); Conway, SC
03/07/2013; 2:25 pm	vs. VMI; Quarterfinals	L 86–90	8–25	HTC Center (2,105); Conway, SC
*Non-conference game. ^{#}Rankings from AP Poll. (#) Tournament seedings in parentheses. All times are in Eastern Time.
