= 2012–13 Charleston Southern Buccaneers men's basketball team =

American college basketball season

2012–13 Charleston Southern Buccaneers men's basketball
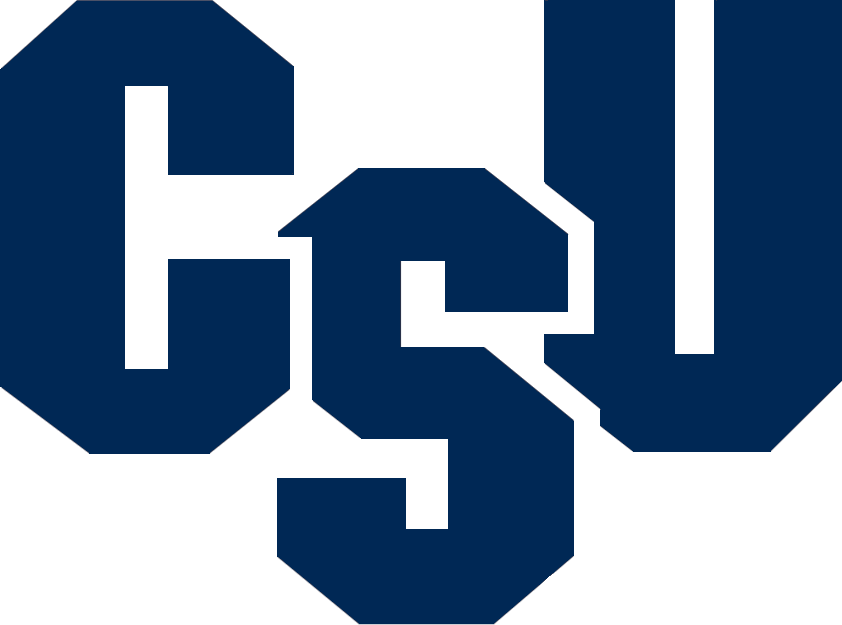

Big South South Division Champions Big South regular season co-champions

NIT, First Round
- Conference: Big South Conference
- South Division
- Record: 19–13 (12–4 Big South)
- Head coach: Barclay Radebaugh (8th season)
- Assistant coaches: BJ McKie; Ahmad Smith; Brad Dobbels
- Home arena: CSU Field House

2012–13 Big South men's basketball standings
| | Conf. | | | | Overall |
| Team | W | | L | PCT | W | | L | PCT |
|---|---|---|---|---|---|---|---|---|
North
| High Point | 12 | – | 4 | .750 | 17 | – | 14 | .548 |
| VMI | 8 | – | 8 | .500 | 14 | – | 17 | .452 |
| Radford | 7 | – | 9 | .438 | 13 | – | 19 | .406 |
| Campbell | 7 | – | 9 | .438 | 13 | – | 20 | .394 |
| Liberty † | 6 | – | 10 | .375 | 15 | – | 21 | .417 |
| Longwood | 4 | – | 12 | .250 | 8 | – | 25 | .242 |
South
| Charleston Southern | 12 | – | 4 | .750 | 19 | – | 13 | .594 |
| Gardner–Webb | 11 | – | 5 | .688 | 21 | – | 13 | .618 |
| UNC Asheville | 10 | – | 6 | .625 | 16 | – | 16 | .500 |
| Coastal Carolina | 9 | – | 7 | .563 | 14 | – | 15 | .483 |
| Winthrop | 6 | – | 10 | .375 | 14 | – | 17 | .452 |
| Presbyterian | 4 | – | 12 | .250 | 8 | – | 24 | .250 |
† 2013 Big South tournament winner As of March 20, 2013; Rankings from AP Poll

The 2012–13 Charleston Southern Buccaneers men's basketball team represented Charleston Southern University during the 2012–13 NCAA Division I men's basketball season. The Buccaneers, led by eighth year head coach Barclay Radebaugh, played their home games at the CSU Field House and were members of the South Division of the Big South Conference. 19–13, 12–4 in Big South play to be champions of the South Division. They advanced to the championship game of the Big South tournament where they lost to Liberty. As a conference champion, they earned an automatic bid to the 2013 NIT where they lost in the first round to Southern Miss.

== Roster ==
| Number | Name | Position | Height | Weight | Year | Hometown |
|---|---|---|---|---|---|---|
| 0 | Arlon Harper | Guard | 6–1 | 170 | Sophomore | College Park, Georgia |
| 2 | Malcolm Bernard | Guard/Forward | 6–5 | 205 | Freshman | Middleburg, Florida |
| 4 | Sheldon Strickland | Guard | 6–0 | 180 | Junior | Lithonia, Georgia |
| 5 | Saah Nimley | Guard | 5–8 | 155 | Sophomore | Lawrenceville, Georgia |
| 10 | Jeremy Sexton | Guard | 6–2 | 175 | Senior | Chattanooga, Tennessee |
| 11 | Matt Kennedy | Guard | 6–3 | 175 | Junior | Charleston, South Carolina |
| 12 | Mitchell Deter | Guard | 6–3 | 190 | Junior | Columbia, South Carolina |
| 14 | Joe Williams | Forward | 6–5 | 195 | Junior | Crescent, Georgia |
| 15 | Paul Gombwer | Forward | 6–6 | 215 | Sophomore | Kaduna, Nigeria |
| 23 | Mathiang Muo | Forward | 6–5 | 217 | Senior | Sydney, Australia |
| 24 | Cedrick Bowen | Forward | 6–5 | 225 | Sophomore | Woodstock, Georgia |
| 30 | Thomas Odom | Guard | 6–3 | 170 | Junior | Florence, South Carolina |
| 33 | Greg Dorleus | Forward | 6–9 | 249 | Sophomore | Oviedo, Florida |
| 35 | Allie Fullah | Forward/Center | 6–8 | 235 | Junior | London, England |

== Schedule ==
| Date time, TV | Rank^{#} | Opponent^{#} | Result | Record | Site (attendance) city, state |
Regular season
| 11/09/2012*; 7:00 pm | | at Charlotte | L 58–68 | 0–1 | Dale F. Halton Arena (4,429); Charlotte, NC |
| 11/11/2012*; 6:00 pm, Pac-12 Network | | at No. 12 Arizona | L 73–82 | 0–2 | McKale Center (14,503); Tucson, AZ |
| 11/15/2012*; 5:30 pm | | Hiwassee | W 105–69 | 1–2 | CSU Field House (888); Charleston, SC |
| 11/20/2012*; 7:30 pm | | East Tennessee State | L 57–59 | 1–3 | CSU Field House (901); Charleston, SC |
| 11/23/2012*; 8:00 pm | | at Alabama | L 46–59 | 1–4 | Coleman Coliseum (12,425); Tuscaloosa, AL |
| 11/28/2012*; 7:30 pm, WMMP/ESPN3 | | College of Charleston | L 67–72 | 1–5 | CSU Field House (1,001); Charleston, SC |
| 12/01/2012*; 5:30 pm | | Barber–Scotia | W 101–69 | 2–5 | CSU Field House (612); Charleston, SC |
| 12/04/2012*; 7:30 pm | | The Citadel | W 101–73 | 3–5 | CSU Field House (895); Charleston, SC |
| 12/18/2012*; 7:00 pm | | at East Tennessee State | W 72–51 | 4–5 | MTSU/MSHA Athletic Center (1,275); Johnson City, TN |
| 12/20/2012*; 8:00 pm, ESPN3 | | at Wichita State | L 53–65 | 4–6 | Charles Koch Arena (10,112); Wichita, KS |
| 12/29/2012*; 5:30 pm | | Virginia Intermont | W 105–59 | 5–6 | CSU Field House (677); Charleston, SC |
| 01/05/2013; 4:00 pm, ESPN3 | | at Radford | W 81–74 | 6–6 (1–0) | Dedmon Center (403); Radford, VA |
| 01/09/2013; 7:30 pm | | Winthrop | W 75–63 | 7–6 (2–0) | CSU Field House (948); Charleston, SC |
| 01/12/2013; 2:00 pm, ESPN3 | | at Longwood | W 75–62 | 8–6 (3–0) | Willett Hall (1,012); Farmville, VA |
| 01/16/2013; 7:30 pm | | UNC Asheville | W 74–68 | 9–6 (4–0) | CSU Field House (1,108); Charleston, SC |
| 01/19/2013; 5:30 pm | | High Point | W 83–75 | 10–6 (5–0) | CSU Field House (963); Charleston, SC |
| 01/23/2013; 7:00 pm | | at Presbyterian | W 79–59 | 11–6 (6–0) | Templeton Physical Education Center (692); Clinton, SC |
| 01/26/2013; 8:00 pm, ESPN3 | | at Liberty | W 79–75 | 12–6 (7–0) | Vines Center (3,246); Lynchburg, VA |
| 01/30/2013; 7:30 pm | | Gardner–Webb | L 73–74 ^{OT} | 12–7 (7–1) | CSU Field House (849); Charleston, SC |
| 02/06/2013; 7:00 pm | | at Coastal Carolina | L 53–73 | 12–8 (7–2) | HTC Center (2,373); Conway, SC |
| 02/09/2013; 5:30 pm | | Campbell | W 86–68 | 13–8 (8–2) | CSU Field House (979); Charleston, SC |
| 02/13/2013; 7:00 pm | | at Winthrop | L 65–70 | 13–9 (8–3) | Winthrop Coliseum (1,212); Rock Hill, SC |
| 02/16/2013; 2:00 pm, ESPN3 | | at UNC Asheville | W 73–65 | 14–9 (9–3) | Kimmel Arena (2,498); Asheville, NC |
| 02/19/2013; 7:30 pm | | Presbyterian | W 72–54 | 15–9 (10–3) | CSU Field House; Charleston, SC |
| 02/21/2013; 7:50 pm | | VMI | W 92–69 | 16–9 (11–3) | CSU Field House (871); Charleston, SC |
| 02/23/2013*; 5:00 pm | | at Rider; BracketBusters | L 54–61 | 16–10 | Alumni Gymnasium (1,523); Lawrenceville, NJ |
| 02/27/2013; 7:00 pm | | at Gardner–Webb | L 62–67 ^{OT} | 16–11 (11–4) | Paul Porter Arena (2,015); Boiling Springs, NC |
| 03/02/2013; 4:30 pm | | Coastal Carolina | W 75–64 | 17–11 (12–4) | CSU Field House (1,002); Charleston, SC |
2013 Big South tournament
| 03/07/2013; 12:00 pm | (1S) | vs. (5S) Winthrop; Quarterfinals | W 54–47 | 18–11 | HTC Center (2,105); Conway, SC |
| 03/09/2013; 12:00 pm, ESPN3 | (1S) | vs. (2N) VMI; Semifinals | W 71–65 | 19–11 | HTC Center (2,598); Conway, SC |
| 03/10/2013; 12:00 pm, ESPN2 | (1S) | vs. (5N) Liberty; Championship Game | L 76–87 | 19–12 | HTC Center (2,532); Conway, SC |
2013 NIT
| 03/20/2013*; 9:15 pm, ESPN3 | (8) | at (1) Southern Miss; First Round | L 71–78 | 19–13 | Reed Green Coliseum (5,018); Hattiesburg, MS |
*Non-conference game. ^{#}Rankings from AP Poll. (#) Tournament seedings in parentheses. All times are in Eastern Time.
