= 2012–13 Coastal Carolina Chanticleers men's basketball team =

American college basketball season

2012–13 Coastal Carolina Chanticleers men's basketball
- Conference: Big South Conference
- South Division
- Record: 14–15 (9–7 Big South)
- Head coach: Cliff Ellis (6th season)
- Assistant coaches: Don Hogan; Benny Moss (2nd season); Mamadou N'Diaye (2nd season)
- Home arena: HTC Center

2012–13 Big South men's basketball standings
	Conf.				Overall
Team	W		L	PCT	W		L	PCT
North
High Point	12	–	4	.750	17	–	14	.548
VMI	8	–	8	.500	14	–	17	.452
Radford	7	–	9	.438	13	–	19	.406
Campbell	7	–	9	.438	13	–	20	.394
Liberty †	6	–	10	.375	15	–	21	.417
Longwood	4	–	12	.250	8	–	25	.242
South
Charleston Southern	12	–	4	.750	19	–	13	.594
Gardner–Webb	11	–	5	.688	21	–	13	.618
UNC Asheville	10	–	6	.625	16	–	16	.500
Coastal Carolina	9	–	7	.563	14	–	15	.483
Winthrop	6	–	10	.375	14	–	17	.452
Presbyterian	4	–	12	.250	8	–	24	.250
† 2013 Big South tournament winner As of March 20, 2013; Rankings from AP Poll

The 2012–13 Coastal Carolina Chanticleers men's basketball team represented Coastal Carolina University during the 2012–13 NCAA Division I men's basketball season. The Chanticleers, led by sixth year head coach Cliff Ellis, played their home games at the brand new HTC Center and were members of the South Division of the Big South Conference. They finished the season 14–15, 9–7 in Big South play to finish in fourth place in the South Division. They lost in the first round of the Big South tournament to Liberty.

== Roster ==
Number	Name	Position	Height	Weight	Year	Hometown
0	Warren Gillis	Guard	6–3	200	Sophomore	Philadelphia, Pennsylvania
2	Anthony Raffa	Guard	6–1	170	Senior	Sea Isle City, New Jersey
3	Danny Nieman	Guard	6–1	196	Senior	Concord, North Carolina
10	Charles Ashford	Guard	6–1	180	Senior	Lexington, Kentucky
11	El Hadji Ndieguene	Forward	6–10	245	Junior	Thiès, Senegal
12	Michel Enanga	Forward	6–5	210	Freshman	Yaoundé, Cameroon
13	Uros Ljeskovic	Guard	6–8	240	Freshman	Nikšić, Montenegro
20	Justin Daniel	Guard	6–4	193	Freshman	Fort Worth, Texas
23	Alioune Diagne	Forward	6–7	212	Freshman	Dakar, Senegal
25	Tristian Curtis	Forward	6–7	215	Freshman	Nassau, Bahamas
32	Bisi Addey	Forward	6–7	205	Senior	Montgomery, Alabama
33	Ron Trapps	Guard	6–4	190	Freshman	Lancaster, South Carolina
55	Kierre Greenwood	Guard	6–2	175	Senior	Cincinnati, Ohio

== Schedule ==
Date time, TV	Opponent	Result	Record	Site (attendance) city, state
Regular season
11/09/2012*; 7:30 pm	Akron	W 74–70 ^{OT}	1–0	HTC Center (3,278); Conway, SC
11/13/2012*; 8:00 pm	at Ole Miss	L 72–90	1–1	Tad Smith Coliseum (3,059); Oxford, MS
11/15/2012*; 8:00 pm	at Tennessee Tech	L 69–71	1–2	Eblen Center (1,231); Cookeville, TN
11/20/2012*; 7:30 pm	Johnson & Wales	W 96–40	2–2	HTC Center (1,643); Conway, SC
11/24/2012*; 7:00 pm	FIU	L 77–87	2–3	HTC Center (1,639); Conway, SC
11/28/2012*; 7:00 pm	at Boston University	L 44–74	2–4	Case Gym (705); Boston, MA
12/06/2012*; 7:00 pm	Boston University	L 63–69	2–5	HTC Center (2,768); Conway, SC
12/13/2012*; 7:30 pm	Toccoa Falls	W 75–38	3–5	HTC Center (2,007); Conway, SC
12/19/2012*; 7:00 pm, ESPN3	Clemson	W 69–46	4–5	HTC Center (3,286); Conway, SC
12/22/2012*; 12:00 pm, ESPN3	at College of Charleston	L 51–60	4–6	TD Arena (3,622); Charleston, SC
12/30/2012*; 7:00 pm	Greensboro	W 85–65	5–6	HTC Center (1,696); Conway, SC
01/05/2013; 2:00 pm	at Longwood	W 80–72	6–6 (1–0)	Willett Hall (655); Farmville, VA
01/09/2013; 7:00 pm	Presbyterian	W 61–43	7–6 (2–0)	HTC Center (2,194); Conway, SC
01/12/2013; 6:00 pm, Flames Sports Network/ESPN3	at Liberty	L 56–64	7–7 (2–1)	Vines Center (2,120); Lynchburg, VA
01/16/2013; 7:00 pm	at Gardner–Webb	L 65–66	7–8 (2–2)	Paul Porter Arena (1,970); Boiling Springs, NC
01/19/2013; 11:00 am, ESPNU	VMI	W 72–49	8–8 (3–2)	HTC Center (2,419); Conway, SC
01/23/2013; 7:00 pm	at UNC Asheville	L 60–63	8–9 (3–3)	Kimmel Arena (1,841); Asheville, NC
01/26/2013; 7:00 pm, ESPN3	Campbell	W 73–59	9–9 (4–3)	HTC Center (2,885); Conway, SC
01/30/2013; 7:00 pm	at Winthrop	L 48–61	9–10 (4–4)	Winthrop Coliseum (1,819); Rock Hill, SC
02/02/2013; 2:00 pm	Radford	W 62–52	10–10 (5–4)	HTC Center (2,107); Conway, SC
02/06/2013; 7:00 pm	Charleston Southern	W 73–53	11–10 (6–4)	HTC Center (2,373); Conway, SC
02/09/2013; 7:00 pm	at High Point	L 62–74	11–11 (6–5)	Millis Center (1,705); High Point, NC
02/13/2013; 7:00 pm	at Presbyterian	W 60–53	12–11 (7–5)	Templeton Physical Education Center (710); Clinton, SC
02/16/2013; 7:00 pm	Gardner–Webb	L 63–70	12–12 (7–6)	HTC Center (2,186); Conway, SC
02/19/2013; 7:00 pm	UNC Asheville	W 65–64	13–12 (8–6)	HTC Center (2,424); Conway, SC
02/23/2013*; 2:00 pm	at Western Carolina; BracketBusters	L 70–80	13–13	Ramsey Center (1,127); Cullowhee, NC
02/27/2013; 7:00 pm	Winthrop	W 73–54	14–13 (9–6)	HTC Center (2,635); Conway, SC
03/02/2013; 4:30 pm	at Charleston Southern	L 64–75	14–14 (9–7)	CSU Field House (1,002); North Charleston, SC
2013 Big South Conference men's basketball tournament
03/05/2013; 8:00 pm	Liberty; First Round	L 61–78	14–15	HTC Center (3,266); Conway, SC
*Non-conference game. ^{#}Rankings from AP Poll. (#) Tournament seedings in parentheses. All times are in Eastern Time.
