= 2012–13 Liberty Flames basketball team =

American college basketball season

2012–13 Liberty Flames men's basketball
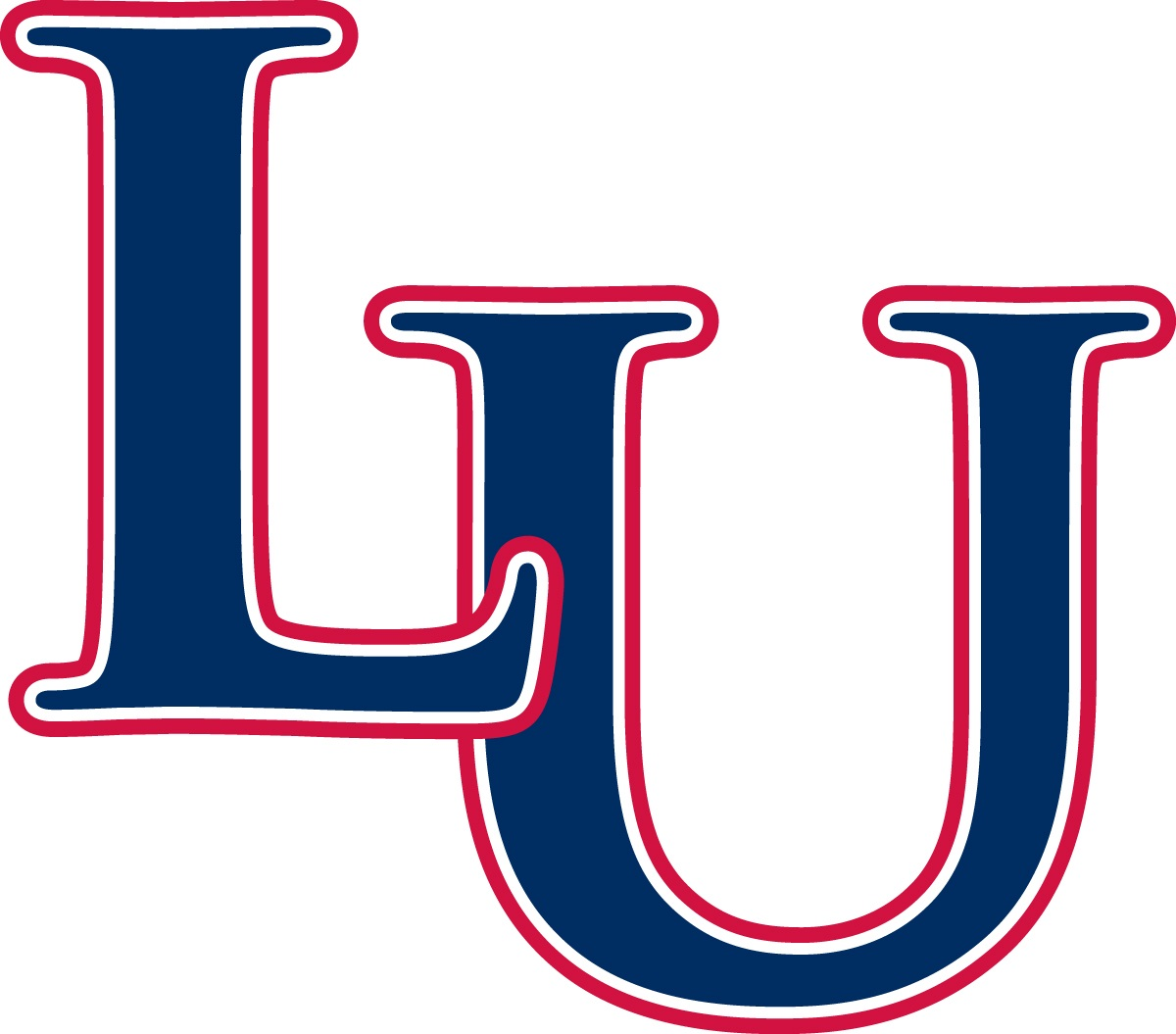

Big South tournament champions

NCAA Tournament Midwest Region 16 Seed, First Four
- Conference: Big South Conference
- North Division
- Record: 15–21 (6–10 Big South)
- Head coach: Dale Layer (4th season)
- Assistant coaches: Jason Eaker; Brian Joyce; Vince Walden
- Home arena: Vines Center

2012–13 Big South men's basketball standings
	Conf.				Overall
Team	W		L	PCT	W		L	PCT
North
High Point	12	–	4	.750	17	–	14	.548
VMI	8	–	8	.500	14	–	17	.452
Radford	7	–	9	.438	13	–	19	.406
Campbell	7	–	9	.438	13	–	20	.394
Liberty †	6	–	10	.375	15	–	21	.417
Longwood	4	–	12	.250	8	–	25	.242
South
Charleston Southern	12	–	4	.750	19	–	13	.594
Gardner–Webb	11	–	5	.688	21	–	13	.618
UNC Asheville	10	–	6	.625	16	–	16	.500
Coastal Carolina	9	–	7	.563	14	–	15	.483
Winthrop	6	–	10	.375	14	–	17	.452
Presbyterian	4	–	12	.250	8	–	24	.250
† 2013 Big South tournament winner As of March 20, 2013; Rankings from AP Poll

The 2012–13 Liberty Flames basketball team represented Liberty University during the 2012–13 NCAA Division I men's basketball season. The Flames, led by fourth year head coach Dale Layer, played their home games at the Vines Center and were members of the North Division of the Big South Conference. Despite losing their first eight games of the season and ending up with a 15–20 record (6–10 in the Big South), Liberty won the Big South tournament to earn an automatic bid to the NCAA Tournament. The Flames were the first 20-loss team in the NCAA Tournament since Coppin State in 2007–08 and only the second 20-loss team ever to qualify. They lost in the first four round to North Carolina A&T to finish the season 15–21.

== Roster ==
2012–13 Liberty Flames men's basketball team
Players
Coaches

Pos.	#	Name	Height	Weight	Year	Hometown
G	0	Jarred Jourdan	6 ft 5 in (1.96 m)	215 lb (98 kg)	So	Oakland, California
G	1	Davon Marshall	5 ft 11 in (1.8 m)	170 lb (77 kg)	Jr	Niagara Falls, New York
G	2	Kelly Assinesi	6 ft 0 in (1.83 m)	170 lb (77 kg)	So	Greenville, South Carolina
G	3	Casey Roberts	6 ft 3 in (1.91 m)	190 lb (86 kg)	Jr	LaVale, Maryland
G	5	Wesley Alcegaire	6 ft 5 in (1.96 m)	185 lb (84 kg)	Fr	Miami, Florida
G	10	Chad Donley	6 ft 2 in (1.88 m)	175 lb (79 kg)	Jr	Baker, Florida
F	11	Andrew Smith	6 ft 9 in (2.06 m)	220 lb (100 kg)	So	Pompano Beach, Florida
F	12	Tomasz Gielo	6 ft 9 in (2.06 m)	220 lb (100 kg)	So	Szczecin, Poland
G	13	Larry Taylor	6 ft 1 in (1.85 m)	170 lb (77 kg)	Fr	Englewood, Florida
G	15	Ethan Layer	6 ft 1 in (1.85 m)	160 lb (73 kg)	So	Forest, Virginia
C	21	Joel Vander Pol	6 ft 10 in (2.08 m)	230 lb (104 kg)	Jr	Cape Coral, Florida
G	22	Tavares Sparks	6 ft 4 in (1.93 m)	185 lb (84 kg)	Sr	Raleigh, North Carolina
F	24	Antwan Burrus	6 ft 6 in (1.98 m)	220 lb (100 kg)	Sr	Winterville, North Carolina
F	32	JR Coronado	6 ft 8 in (2.03 m)	245 lb (111 kg)	Jr	Caracas, Venezuela
G	33	John Caleb Sanders	6 ft 0 in (1.83 m)	180 lb (82 kg)	Jr	Sugar Land, Texas
F	42	Sommy Ogukwe	6 ft 7 in (2.01 m)	230 lb (104 kg)	So	Abuja, Nigeria

Head coach

- Dale Layer (Eckerd)

Assistant coach(es)

- Jason Eaker (Texas–Pan American)
- Brian Joyce (Oklahoma Christian)
- Vince Walden (Longwood)

Legend

- (C) Team captain
- (S) Suspended
- (I) Ineligible
- (W) Walk-on
- Injured
- Current redshirt

Roster
Last update: 2013-03-11

== Schedule ==
Date time, TV	Rank^{#}	Opponent^{#}	Result	Record	Site (attendance) city, state
Regular season
11/09/2012*; 7:00 pm		at Richmond	L 42–84	0–1	Robins Center (6,798); Richmond, VA
11/12/2012*; 7:00 pm, ESPN3		William & Mary	L 59–71	0–2	Vines Center (3,049); Lynchburg, VA
11/14/2012*; 7:00 pm, ESPN3		at Georgetown; Legends Classic	L 59–68	0–3	Verizon Center (6,743); Washington, D.C.
11/19/2012*; 6:00 pm		vs. UC Irvine; Legends Classic	L 46–64	0–4	Bernard Johnson Coliseum (1,089); Huntsville, TX
11/20/2012*; 8:00 pm		at Sam Houston State; Legends Classic	L 50–64	0–5	Bernard Johnson Coliseum (599); Huntsville, TX
11/21/2012*; 6:00 pm		vs. Southern Miss; Legends Classic	L 56–74	0–6	Bernard Johnson Coliseum (224); Huntsville, TX
11/29/2012*; 7:00 pm, ESPN3		Morgan State	L 62–67	0–7	Vines Center (2,233); Lynchburg, VA
12/02/2012*; 3:00 pm, ESPN3		Georgia State	L 66–67	0–8	Vines Center (1,717); Lynchburg, VA
12/04/2012*; 7:00 pm		Southern Virginia	W 76–51	1–8	Vines Center (1,846); Lynchburg, VA
12/15/2012*; 4:00 pm		at Howard	L 53–60	1–9	Burr Gymnasium (205); Washington, D.C.
12/18/2012*; 7:00 pm		at Iona	L 69–87	1–10	Hynes Athletic Center (1,537); New Rochelle, NY
12/21/2012*; 7:00 pm		Milligan	W 81–63	2–10	Vines Center (1,295); Lynchburg, VA
12/28/2012*; 7:00 pm		Union (KY)	W 104–67	3–10	Vines Center (1,335); Lynchburg, VA
12/31/2012*; 2:00 pm		at Western Carolina	W 63–62	4–10	Ramsey Center (764); Cullowhee, NC
01/05/2013; 6:00 pm, ESPN3		UNC Asheville	L 69–83	4–11 (0–1)	Vines Center (1,688); Lynchburg, VA
01/09/2013; 7:00 pm, ESPN3		at VMI	L 69–82	4–12 (0–2)	Cameron Hall (1,068); Lexington, VA
01/12/2013; 6:00 pm, ESPN3		Coastal Carolina	W 64–56	5–12 (1–2)	Vines Center (2,120); Lynchburg, VA
01/16/2013; 7:00 pm		at High Point	L 72–77 ^{2OT}	5–13 (1–3)	Millis Center (1,527); High Point, NC
01/19/2013; 7:00 pm		at Presbyterian	L 60–68	5–14 (1–4)	Templeton Center (1,153); Clinton, SC
01/22/2013; 7:00 pm, ESPN3		Longwood	W 74–47	6–14 (2–4)	Vines Center (2,106); Lynchburg, VA
01/26/2013; 8:00 pm, ESPN3		Charleston Southern	L 75–79	6–15 (2–5)	Vines Center (3,246); Lynchburg, VA
01/29/2013; 7:00 pm, ESPN3		Campbell	W 89–72	7–15 (3–5)	Vines Center (1,897); Lynchburg, VA
02/02/2013; 7:00 pm		at Winthrop	L 56–66	7–16 (3–6)	Winthrop Coliseum (2,168); Rock Hill, SC
02/05/2013; 7:00 pm, ESPN3		Radford	W 75–70	8–16 (4–6)	Vines Center (1,939); Lynchburg, VA
02/09/2013; 7:00 pm, ESPN3		at Gardner–Webb	L 68–71	8–17 (4–7)	Paul Porter Arena (2,370); Boiling Springs, NC
02/13/2013; 7:00 pm, ESPN3		at Campbell	W 82–80	9–17 (5–7)	John W. Pope, Jr. Convocation Center (1,187); Buies Creek, NC
02/16/2013; 6:00 pm, ESPN3		High Point	L 68–73	9–18 (5–8)	Vines Center (2,996); Lynchburg, VA
02/19/2013; 7:00 pm, ESPN3		at Longwood	L 101–102	9–19 (5–9)	Willett Hall (1,693); Farmville, VA
02/23/2013*; 4:00 pm		Austin Peay; BracketBusters	W 79–73 ^{OT}	10–19	Vines Center (2,678); Lynchburg, VA
02/26/2013; 7:00 pm, ESPN3		VMI	L 66–83	10–20 (5–10)	Vines Center (2,198); Lynchburg, VA
03/02/2013; 4:30 pm		at Radford	W 73–56	11–20 (6–10)	Dedmon Center (2,385); Radford, VA
2013 Big South Conference men's basketball tournament
03/05/2013; 8:00 pm		at No. (4S) Coastal Carolina; First Round	W 78–61	12–20	HTC Center (3,266); Conway, SC
03/07/2013; 8:30 pm		vs. No. (1N) High Point; Quarterfinals	W 61–60	13–20	HTC Center (2,606); Conway, SC
03/09/2013; 2:30 pm, ESPN3		vs. No. (2S) Gardner–Webb; Semifinals	W 65–62	14–20	HTC Center (2,598); Conway, SC
03/10/2013; 12:00 pm, ESPN2		vs. No. (1S) Charleston Southern; Championship Game	W 87–76	15–20	HTC Center (2,532); Conway, SC
2013 NCAA tournament
03/19/2013; 6:40 pm, truTV	No. 16 MW	vs. (16 MW) North Carolina A&T; First Four	L 72–73	15–21	UD Arena (12,027); Dayton, OH
*Non-conference game. ^{#}Rankings from AP Poll. (#) Tournament seedings in parentheses. All times are in Eastern Time. (#) during NCAA Tournament is seed with Region MW=Midwest.
