= 2012–13 Radford Highlanders men's basketball team =

American college basketball season

2012–13 Radford Highlanders men's basketball
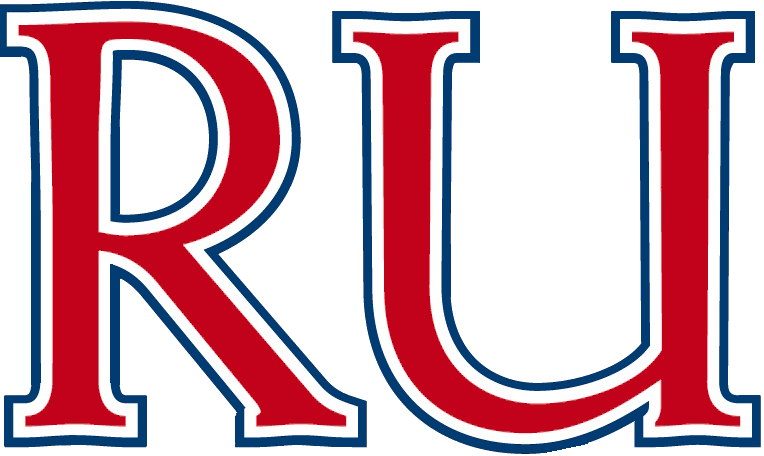
- Conference: Big South Conference
- North Division
- Record: 13–19 (7–9 Big South)
- Head coach: Mike Jones (2nd season)
- Assistant coaches: Kyle Getter; Chris Hawkins; JD Byers
- Home arena: Dedmon Center

2012–13 Big South men's basketball standings
	Conf.				Overall
Team	W		L	PCT	W		L	PCT
North
High Point	12	–	4	.750	17	–	14	.548
VMI	8	–	8	.500	14	–	17	.452
Radford	7	–	9	.438	13	–	19	.406
Campbell	7	–	9	.438	13	–	20	.394
Liberty †	6	–	10	.375	15	–	21	.417
Longwood	4	–	12	.250	8	–	25	.242
South
Charleston Southern	12	–	4	.750	19	–	13	.594
Gardner–Webb	11	–	5	.688	21	–	13	.618
UNC Asheville	10	–	6	.625	16	–	16	.500
Coastal Carolina	9	–	7	.563	14	–	15	.483
Winthrop	6	–	10	.375	14	–	17	.452
Presbyterian	4	–	12	.250	8	–	24	.250
† 2013 Big South tournament winner As of March 20, 2013; Rankings from AP Poll

The 2012–13 Radford Highlanders men's basketball team represented Radford University during the 2012–13 NCAA Division I men's basketball season. The Highlanders, led by second year head coach Mike Jones, played their home games at Dedmon Center and were members of the North Division of the Big South Conference. They finished the season 13–19, 7–9 in Big South play to finish in tie for third place in the North Division. They lost in the first round of the Big South tournament to Winthrop.

== Roster ==
Number	Name	Position	Height	Weight	Year	Hometown
00	Kion Brown	Forward	6–8	215	Freshman	Richmond, Virginia
1	Taj Owens	Guard	5–10	155	Freshman	Chesapeake, Virginia
2	Javonte Green	Guard	6–4	180	Sophomore	Alberta, Virginia
5	Rashaun Davis	Guard	6–0	160	Freshman	Charlotte, North Carolina
10	R.J. Price	Guard	6–0	170	Sophomore	Mechanicsville, Virginia
11	Ya Ya Anderson	Guard	6–2	180	Freshman	Palmyra, Virginia
12	Allen Dickerson	Guard	6–2	180	Junior	Radford, Virginia
15	Lucas Dyer	Forward	6–8	215	Freshman	Richmond, Virginia
21	Matt Murphy	Center	6–6	300	Freshman	Alexandria, Virginia
25	Blake Smith	Guard	6–4	175	Senior	Charlotte, North Carolina
30	Jalen Carethers	Forward	6–8	185	Sophomore	Burlington, North Carolina
32	Juwan Wells	Guard/Forward	6–6	190	Freshman	La Plata, Maryland
33	Kyle Noreen	Guard	6–5	185	Sophomore	Minneapolis, Minnesota
55	Brandon Holcomb	Forward	6–7	200	Freshman	Murrieta, California

== Schedule ==
Date time, TV	Opponent	Result	Record	Site (attendance) city, state
Regular season
11/09/2012*; 7:00 pm	at Wake Forest	L 67–79	0–1	LJVM Coliseum (7,042); Winston-Salem, NC
11/12/2012*; 7:00 pm	Cincinnati Christian; Comfort Suites Invitational	W 76–71 ^{OT}	1–1	Dedmon Center (513); Radford, VA
11/16/2012*; 8:00 pm	vs. Towson; Comfort Suites Invitational	L 67–75	1–2	Alumni Coliseum (250); Richmond, KY
11/17/2012*; 8:00 pm	vs. Kennesaw State; Comfort Suites Invitational	W 67–58	2–2	Alumni Coliseum (150); Richmond, KY
11/18/2012*; 5:00 pm	at Eastern Kentucky; Comfort Suites Invitational	L 75–83	2–3	Alumni Coliseum (1,050); Richmond, KY
11/21/2012*; 7:00 pm	Brevard	W 81–53	3–3	Dedmon Center (408); Radford, VA
11/24/2012*; 2:00 pm	at The Citadel	W 74–61	4–3	McAlister Field House (1,031); Charleston, SC
11/28/2012*; 7:00 pm	Hampton	W 73–64	5–3	Dedmon Center (1,723); Radford, VA
12/04/2012*; 7:00 pm	at Delaware	L 59–68	5–4	Bob Carpenter Center (1,798); Newark, DE
12/08/2012*; 2:00 pm	William & Mary	L 55–60	5–5	Dedmon Center (1,573); Radford, VA
12/19/2012*; 7:30 pm	at Charlotte	L 52–68	5–6	Dale F. Halton Arena (4,636); Charlotte, NC
12/22/2012*; 4:00 pm, ROOT/ESPN3	at West Virginia	L 62–72	5–7	WVU Coliseum (7,073); Morgantown, WV
12/29/2012*; 2:00 pm	Central Pennsylvania	W 95–68	6–7	Dedmon Center (414); Radford, VA
01/02/2013*; 7:00 pm	at North Carolina A&T	L 77–81	6–8	Corbett Sports Center (746); Greensboro, NC
01/05/2013; 4:00 pm, ESPN3	Charleston Southern	L 74–81	6–9 (0–1)	Dedmon Center (403); Radford, VA
01/09/2013; 7:00 pm	High Point	W 59–54	7–9 (1–1)	Dedmon Center (307); Radford, VA
01/12/2013; 2:00 pm	at UNC Asheville	L 61–79	7–10 (1–2)	Kimmel Arena (1,965); Asheville, NC
01/16/2013; 7:00 pm	Longwood	W 82–72	8–10 (2–2)	Dedmon Center (764); Radford, VA
01/19/2013; 7:00 pm	at Gardner–Webb	W 52–51	9–10 (3–2)	Paul Porter Arena (2,107); Boiling Springs, NC
01/23/2013; 7:00 pm	at Campbell	L 60–69	9–11 (3–3)	John W. Pope, Jr. Convocation Center (1,338); Buies Creek, NC
01/26/2013; 4:00 pm	Winthrop	W 58–57	10–11 (4–3)	Dedmon Center (2,109); Radford, VA
01/30/2013; 7:00 pm	VMI	L 69–70	10–12 (4–4)	Dedmon Center (1,522); Radford, VA
02/02/2013; 2:00 pm	at Coastal Carolina	L 52–62	10–13 (4–5)	HTC Center (2,107); Conway, SC
02/05/2013; 7:00 pm, ESPN3	at Liberty	L 70–75	10–14 (4–6)	Vines Center (1,939); Lynchburg, VA
02/09/2013; 2:00 pm	Presbyterian	W 76–65	11–14 (5–6)	Dedmon Center (1,412); Radford, VA
02/13/2013; 7:00 pm	at VMI	W 82–79	12–14 (6–6)	Cameron Hall (1,172); Lexington, VA
02/16/2013; 2:00 pm	at Longwood	L 61–76	12–15 (6–7)	Willett Hall (1,787); Farmville, VA
02/19/2013; 7:00 pm, ESPN3	Campbell	L 66–72 ^{OT}	12–16 (6–8)	Dedmon Center (1,742); Radford, VA
02/24/2013*; 12:00 pm	at Siena; BracketBusters	L 57–65 ^{OT}	12–17	Times Union Center (5,768); Albany, NY
02/27/2013; 7:00 pm	at High Point	W 63–58	13–17 (7–8)	Millis Center (1,302); High Point, NC
03/02/2013; 4:30 pm	Liberty	L 56–73	13–18 (7–9)	Dedmon Center (2,385); Radford, VA
2013 Big South Conference men's basketball tournament
03/05/2013; 12:00 pm	vs. Winthrop; First Round	L 58–60 ^{OT}	13–19	HTC Center (1,858); Conway, SC
*Non-conference game. ^{#}Rankings from AP Poll. (#) Tournament seedings in parentheses. All times are in Eastern Time.
