= 2012–13 Campbell Fighting Camels basketball team =

American college basketball season

2012–13 Campbell Fighting Camels basketball
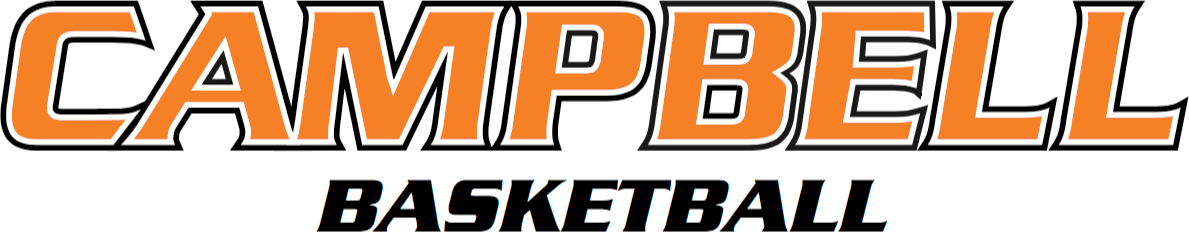
- Conference: Big South Conference
- North Division
- Record: 13–20 (7–9 Big South)
- Head coach: Robbie Laing (10th season)
- Home arena: John W. Pope, Jr. Convocation Center

2012–13 Big South men's basketball standings
	Conf.				Overall
Team	W		L	PCT	W		L	PCT
North
High Point	12	–	4	.750	17	–	14	.548
VMI	8	–	8	.500	14	–	17	.452
Radford	7	–	9	.438	13	–	19	.406
Campbell	7	–	9	.438	13	–	20	.394
Liberty †	6	–	10	.375	15	–	21	.417
Longwood	4	–	12	.250	8	–	25	.242
South
Charleston Southern	12	–	4	.750	19	–	13	.594
Gardner–Webb	11	–	5	.688	21	–	13	.618
UNC Asheville	10	–	6	.625	16	–	16	.500
Coastal Carolina	9	–	7	.563	14	–	15	.483
Winthrop	6	–	10	.375	14	–	17	.452
Presbyterian	4	–	12	.250	8	–	24	.250
† 2013 Big South tournament winner As of March 20, 2013; Rankings from AP Poll

The 2012–13 Campbell Fighting Camels basketball team represented Campbell University during the 2012–13 NCAA Division I men's basketball season. The Fighting Camels, led by tenth year head coach Robbie Laing, played their home games at the John W. Pope, Jr. Convocation Center and were members of the North Division of the Big South Conference. They finished the season 13–20, 7–9 in Big South play to finish tied for third place in the North Division. They lost in the quarterfinals of the Big South tournament to Gardner–Webb.

Following the season, head coach Robbie Laing was fired. He posted a record of 113–182 in ten seasons.

== Roster ==
Number	Name	Position	Height	Weight	Year	Hometown
0	Antwon Oliver	Forward	6–6	185	Junior	Racine, Wisconsin
1	Trey Freeman	Guard	6–2	185	Sophomore	Virginia Beach, Virginia
2	Darian Hooker	Guard	6–0	170	Junior	Washington, D.C.
3	Casey Perrin	Guard	5–9	160	Freshman	Scottsdale, Arizona
4	Darren White	Guard	6–4	210	Senior	Danville, Virginia
5	Nnadozie Onuoha	Guard	6–3	200	Junior	Wake Forest, North Carolina
10	Leek Leek	Forward	6–6	215	Junior	Khartoum, Sudan
11	Jordan Faciane	Guard	6–4	210	Freshman	Ellenwood, Georgia
15	Marvelle Harris	Forward	6–6	215	Junior	Macon, Georgia
20	Andrew Ryan	Guard	6–5	200	Sophomore	Lynden, Washington
22	Darius Leonard	Forward	6–9	225	Sophomore	Raleigh, North Carolina
23	Reco McCarter	Guard/Forward	6–6	195	Sophomore	Goldsboro, North Carolina
30	Tyler Zegarzewski	Forward	6–6	205	Sophomore	Hope Valley, Rhode Island
35	D.J. Mason	Forward	6–6	215	Freshman	Clarkton, North Carolina
41	Antonio Kalpic	Forward	6–9	220	Junior	Šibenik, Croatia
45	Trae Bremer	Center	6–9	250	Freshman	Leoti, Kansas

== Schedule ==
Date time, TV	Opponent	Result	Record	Site (attendance) city, state
Exhibition
11/01/2012*; 7:00 pm	Coker	W 71–65		John W. Pope, Jr. Convocation Center (1,723); Buies Creek, NC
Regular season
11/09/2012*; 7:00 pm	Averett	W 74–55	1–0	John W. Pope, Jr. Convocation Center (1,746); Buies Creek, NC
11/12/2012*; 7:00 pm	Northwestern State	L 67–71	1–1	John W. Pope, Jr. Convocation Center (1,583); Buies Creek, NC
11/16/2012*; 7:45 pm	Appalachian State	W 101–82	2–1	John W. Pope, Jr. Convocation Center (2,873); Buies Creek, NC
11/18/2012*; 7:00 pm	at Iowa State; Global Sports Hoops Showcase	L 68–88	2–2	Hilton Coliseum (11,352); Ames, IA
11/20/2012*; 7:00 pm, ESPN3	at No. 22 Cincinnati; Global Sports Hoops Showcase	L 72–91	2–3	Fifth Third Arena (5,924); Cincinnati, OH
11/23/2012*; 1:30 pm	vs. North Carolina A&T; Global Sports Hoops Showcase	L 60–85	2–4	Thomas & Mack Center (N/A); Paradise, NV
11/24/2012*; 2:00 pm	vs. Northern Arizona; Global Sports Hoops Showcase	L 62–70	2–5	Thomas & Mack Center (N/A); Paradise, NV
11/29/2012*; 7:00 pm	Newberry	W 91–78	3–5	John W. Pope, Jr. Convocation Center (1,504); Buies Creek, NC
12/04/2012*; 7:00 pm	Robert Morris	L 58–61	3–6	John W. Pope, Jr. Convocation Center (1,318); Buies Creek, NC
12/12/2012*; 7:00 pm	Rio Grande	L 65–67	3–7	John W. Pope, Jr. Convocation Center (1,007); Buies Creek, NC
12/19/2012*; 9:00 pm, Root Sports	at No. 14 Gonzaga	L 52–74	3–8	McCarthey Athletic Center (6,000); Spokane, WA
12/22/2012*; 10:00 pm	at Seattle	L 49–72	3–9	KeyArena (1,911); Seattle, WA
12/29/2012*; 1:00 pm	UNC Wilmington	W 72–60	4–9	John W. Pope, Jr. Convocation Center (1,895); Buies Creek, NC
01/02/2013*; 7:00 pm	at East Carolina	W 86–81 ^{OT}	5–9	Williams Arena at Minges Coliseum (3,770); Greenville, NC
01/05/2013; 3:30 pm	Gardner–Webb	W 93–81 ^{3OT}	6–9 (1–0)	John W. Pope, Jr. Convocation Center (1,423); Buies Creek, NC
01/09/2013; 7:00 pm	at Longwood	W 83–73	7–9 (2–0)	Willett Hall (409); Farmville, VA
01/12/2013; 7:45 pm	at Presbyterian	W 62–46	8–9 (3–0)	Templeton Physical Education Center (1,197); Clinton, SC
01/16/2013; 7:00 pm	at VMI	L 57–76	8–10 (3–1)	Cameron Hall (2,234); Lexington, VA
01/19/2013; 1:00 pm, ESPN3	Winthrop	W 63–59	9–10 (4–1)	John W. Pope, Jr. Convocation Center (2,518); Buies Creek, NC
01/23/2013; 7:00 pm	Radford	W 69–60	10–10 (5–1)	John W. Pope, Jr. Convocation Center (1,338); Buies Creek, NC
01/26/2013; 7:00 pm, ESPN3	at Coastal Carolina	L 59–73	10–11 (5–2)	HTC Center (2,885); Conway, SC
01/29/2013; 7:00 pm, ESPN3	at Liberty	L 72–89	10–12 (5–3)	Vines Center (1,897); Lynchburg, VA
02/02/2013; 3:30 pm	UNC Asheville	L 61–78	10–13 (5–4)	John W. Pope, Jr. Convocation Center (2,884); Buies Creek, NC
02/06/2013; 7:00 pm	High Point	L 52–58	10–14 (5–5)	John W. Pope, Jr. Convocation Center (1,915); Buies Creek, NC
02/09/2013; 5:30 pm	at Charleston Southern	L 68–86	10–15 (5–6)	CSU Field House (979); Charleston, SC
02/13/2013; 7:00 pm, ESPN3	Liberty	L 80–82	10–16 (5–7)	John W. Pope, Jr. Convocation Center (1,187); Buies Creek, NC
02/16/2013; 2:00 pm	VMI	W 87–78	11–16 (6–7)	John W. Pope, Jr. Convocation Center (2,258); Buies Creek, NC
02/19/2013; 7:00 pm, ESPN3	at Radford	W 72–66 ^{OT}	12–16 (7–7)	Dedmon Center (1,742); Radford, VA
02/23/2013*; 4:00 pm	Savannah State; BracketBusters	L 63–69	12–17	John W. Pope, Jr. Convocation Center (1,302); Buies Creek, NC
02/27/2013; 7:00 pm	Longwood	L 66–79	12–18 (7–8)	John W. Pope, Jr. Convocation Center (1,048); Buies Creek, NC
03/02/2013; 4:00 pm	at High Point	L 62–63	12–19 (7–9)	Millis Center (1,505); High Point, NC
2013 Big South Conference men's basketball tournament
03/05/2013; 6:00 pm	vs. Presbyterian; First Round	W 81–73 ^{OT}	13–19	HTC Center (3,266); Conway, SC
03/07/2013; 6:00 pm	vs. Gardner–Webb; Quarterfinals	L 57–71	13–20	HTC Center (2,606); Conway, SC
*Non-conference game. ^{#}Rankings from AP Poll. (#) Tournament seedings in parentheses. All times are in Eastern Time.
