= 2012–13 Gardner–Webb Runnin' Bulldogs men's basketball team =

American college basketball season

2012–13 Gardner–Webb Runnin' Bulldogs men's basketball
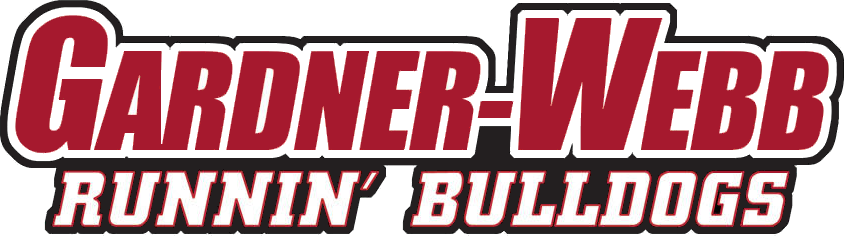

Cancun Challenge Mayan Division champions

CIT, First Round
- Conference: Big South Conference
- South Division
- Record: 21–13 (11–5 Big South)
- Head coach: Chris Holtmann (3rd season)
- Assistant coaches: Jay McAuley; Mike Netti; Takayo Siddle
- Home arena: Paul Porter Arena

2012–13 Big South men's basketball standings
	Conf.				Overall
Team	W		L	PCT	W		L	PCT
North
High Point	12	–	4	.750	17	–	14	.548
VMI	8	–	8	.500	14	–	17	.452
Radford	7	–	9	.438	13	–	19	.406
Campbell	7	–	9	.438	13	–	20	.394
Liberty †	6	–	10	.375	15	–	21	.417
Longwood	4	–	12	.250	8	–	25	.242
South
Charleston Southern	12	–	4	.750	19	–	13	.594
Gardner–Webb	11	–	5	.688	21	–	13	.618
UNC Asheville	10	–	6	.625	16	–	16	.500
Coastal Carolina	9	–	7	.563	14	–	15	.483
Winthrop	6	–	10	.375	14	–	17	.452
Presbyterian	4	–	12	.250	8	–	24	.250
† 2013 Big South tournament winner As of March 20, 2013; Rankings from AP Poll

The 2012–13 Gardner–Webb Runnin' Bulldogs men's basketball team represented Gardner–Webb University during the 2012–13 NCAA Division I men's basketball season. The Runnin' Bulldogs, led by third year head coach Chris Holtmann, played their home games at the Paul Porter Arena and were members of the South Division of the Big South Conference. They finished the season 21–13, 11–5 in Big South play to finish in second place in the South Division.

They advanced to the semifinals of the Big South tournament where they lost to Liberty. They were invited to the 2013 CIT, their first ever Division I postseason tournament, where they lost in the first round to Eastern Kentucky.

== Roster ==
Number	Name	Position	Height	Weight	Year	Hometown
0	Donta Harper	Forward	6–6	180	Sophomore	Winterville, North Carolina
2	Tyler Strange	Guard	5–9	175	Sophomore	Leominster, Massachusetts
3	Tashan Newsome	Guard	6–3	200	Senior	Albany, New York
4	Logan Stumpf	Guard	6–6	185	Freshman	Harrisburg, Pennsylvania
5	Naji Hibbert	Guard	6–5	190	Senior	Baltimore, Maryland
10	Max Landis	Guard	6–2	175	Sophomore	Indianapolis, Indiana
11	Isaiah Ivey	Guard	6–2	190	Freshman	Georgetown, Kentucky
15	Jarvis Davis	Guard	6–0	180	Sophomore	Columbia, South Carolina
23	Onzie Branch	Forward	6–6	215	Junior	Topeka, Kansas
24	Kevin Hartley	Forward	6–6	235	Senior	Klein, Texas
30	Adam Sweeney	Guard	6–1	180	Freshman	Madison, Ohio
33	Corey Hansley	Forward	6–8	220	Sophomore	Candler, North Carolina
34	Jerome Hill	Forward	6–5	210	Freshman	Adel, Georgia
54	Mike Byron	Center	6–11	250	Junior	San Antonio, Texas

== Schedule ==
Date time, TV	Opponent	Result	Record	Site (attendance) city, state
Regular season
11/09/2012*; 7:00 pm	at No. 11 North Carolina	L 59–76	0–1	Dean Smith Center (16,430); Chapel Hill, NC
11/10/2012*; 7:30 pm	Covenant	W 77–39	1–1	Paul Porter Arena (1,204); Boiling Springs, NC
11/14/2012*; 6:00 pm	Lipscomb	L 62–66	1–2	Paul Porter Arena (1,450); Boiling Springs, NC
11/15/2012*; 8:30 pm	at DePaul; Cancún Challenge	W 71–59	2–2	Allstate Arena (7,011); Rosemont, IL
11/17/2012*; 8:00 pm, BTN2	at Iowa; Cancún Challenge	L 56–65	2–3	Carver–Hawkeye Arena (11,852); Iowa City, IA
11/20/2012*; 4:00 pm	vs. Howard; Cancún Challenge	W 55–43	3–3	Moon Palace Resort (902); Cancún, Mexico
11/21/2012*; 4:00 pm	vs. Austin Peay; Cancún Challenge	W 72–62	4–3	Moon Palace Resort (302); Cancún, Mexico
11/25/2012*; 4:00 pm, BTN	at Illinois	L 62–63	4–4	Assembly Hall (12,565); Champaign, IL
12/03/2012*; 7:00 pm	UVA–Wise	W 77–58	5–4	Paul Porter Arena (772); Boiling Springs, NC
12/05/2012*; 7:00 pm	at Wofford	L 42–54	5–5	Benjamin Johnson Arena (864); Spartanburg, SC
12/08/2012*; 7:00 pm	Tennessee Tech	W 61–41	6–5	Paul Porter Arena (1,645); Boiling Springs, NC
12/15/2012*; 7:00 pm	The Citadel	W 71–58	7–5	Paul Porter Arena (1,640); Boiling Springs, NC
12/18/2012*; 7:00 pm	at East Carolina	L 60–62	7–6	Williams Arena (3,961); Greenville, NC
12/22/2012*; 4:30 pm	Spalding	W 83–54	8–6	Paul Porter Arena (302); Boiling Springs, NC
01/05/2013; 3:30 pm	at Campbell	L 81–93 ^{3OT}	8–7 (0–1)	John W. Pope, Jr. Convocation Center (1,423); Buies Creek, NC
01/09/2013; 7:00 pm	UNC Asheville	W 78–71	9–7 (1–1)	Paul Porter Arena (2,030); Boiling Springs, NC
01/12/2013; 7:00 pm	at High Point	L 64–70	9–8 (1–2)	Millis Center (1,604); High Point, NC
01/16/2013; 7:00 pm	Coastal Carolina	W 66–65	10–8 (2–2)	Paul Porter Arena (1,970); Boiling Springs, NC
01/19/2013; 7:00 pm	Radford	L 51–52	10–9 (2–3)	Paul Porter Arena (2,107); Boiling Springs, NC
01/23/2013; 7:00 pm	at Winthrop	L 55–61	10–10 (2–4)	Winthrop Coliseum (1,356); Rock Hill, SC
01/26/2013; 1:00 pm	at VMI	W 63–49	11–10 (3–4)	Cameron Hall (3,320); Lexington, VA
01/30/2013; 7:30 pm	at Charleston Southern	W 74–73 ^{OT}	12–10 (4–4)	CSU Field House (849); North Charleston, SC
02/02/2013; 7:00 pm	Longwood	W 76–65	13–10 (5–4)	Paul Porter Arena (2,109); Boiling Springs, NC
02/06/2013; 7:00 pm	at Presbyterian	L 54–57	13–11 (5–5)	Templeton Physical Education Center (595); Clinton, SC
02/09/2013; 7:00 pm, ESPN3	Liberty	W 71–68	14–11 (6–5)	Paul Porter Arena (2,370); Boiling Springs, NC
02/13/2013; 7:00 pm, ESPN3	at UNC Asheville	W 67–65	15–11 (7–5)	Kimmel Arena (1,771); Asheville, NC
02/16/2013; 7:00 pm	at Coastal Carolina	W 70–63	16–11 (8–5)	HTC Center (2,186); Conway, SC
02/19/2013; 7:00 pm	Winthrop	W 65–52	17–11 (9–5)	Paul Porter Arena (1,502); Boiling Springs, NC
02/23/2013*; 4:00 pm	at College of Charleston; BracketBusters	W 55–52	18–11	TD Arena (3,823); Charleston, SC
02/27/2013; 7:00 pm	Charleston Southern	W 67–62 ^{OT}	19–11 (10–5)	Paul Porter Arena (2,015); Boiling Springs, NC
03/02/2013; 4:30 pm	Presbyterian	W 76–57	20–11 (11–5)	Paul Porter Arena (2,245); Boiling Springs, NC
2013 Big South Tournament
03/07/2013; 6:00 pm	vs. Campbell; Quarterfinals	W 71–57	21–11	HTC Center (2,606); Conway, SC
03/09/2013; 2:30 pm, ESPN3	vs. Liberty; Semifinals	L 62–65	21–12	HTC Center (2,598); Conway, SC
2013 CIT
03/19/2013*; 7:00 pm	Eastern Kentucky; First Round	L 62–69	21–13	Paul Porter Arena (2,650); Boiling Springs, NC
*Non-conference game. ^{#}Rankings from AP Poll. (#) Tournament seedings in parentheses. All times are in Eastern Time.
