= 2012–13 High Point Panthers men's basketball team =

American college basketball season

2012–13 High Point Panthers men's basketball

Big South North Division Champions Big South regular season co-champions

CIT, First Round
- Conference: Big South Conference
- North Division
- Record: 17–14 (12–4 Big South)
- Head coach: Scott Cherry (4th season)
- Assistant coaches: Ahmad Dorsett; Neill Berry; Trey Brown
- Home arena: Millis Athletic Convocation Center

2012–13 Big South men's basketball standings
	Conf.				Overall
Team	W		L	PCT	W		L	PCT
North
High Point	12	–	4	.750	17	–	14	.548
VMI	8	–	8	.500	14	–	17	.452
Radford	7	–	9	.438	13	–	19	.406
Campbell	7	–	9	.438	13	–	20	.394
Liberty †	6	–	10	.375	15	–	21	.417
Longwood	4	–	12	.250	8	–	25	.242
South
Charleston Southern	12	–	4	.750	19	–	13	.594
Gardner–Webb	11	–	5	.688	21	–	13	.618
UNC Asheville	10	–	6	.625	16	–	16	.500
Coastal Carolina	9	–	7	.563	14	–	15	.483
Winthrop	6	–	10	.375	14	–	17	.452
Presbyterian	4	–	12	.250	8	–	24	.250
† 2013 Big South tournament winner As of March 20, 2013; Rankings from AP Poll

The 2012–13 High Point Panthers men's basketball team represented High Point University during the 2012–13 NCAA Division I men's basketball season. The Panthers, led by fourth year head coach Scott Cherry, played their home games at the Millis Athletic Convocation Center and were members of the North Division of the Big South Conference. They finished the season 17–14, 12–4 in Big South play to be champions of the North Division. They lost in the quarterfinals of the Big South tournament to Liberty. They were invited to the 2013 CIT where they lost in the first round to UC Irvine.

== Roster ==
Number	Name	Position	Height	Weight	Year	Hometown
0	John Brown	Forward	6–7	200	R-Freshman	Jacksonville, Florida
1	Dejuan McGaughy	Guard	6–1	190	Junior	Columbus, Ohio
2	Derrell Edwards	Guard	6–2	200	Junior	Baltimore, Maryland
3	Justin Cheek	Guard	6–3	185	Junior	Charlotte, North Carolina
4	Cliff Cornish	Forward	6–8	240	Freshman	Glen Burnie, Maryland
5	Devante Wallace	Guard	6–5	180	Sophomore	Baltimore, Maryland
11	Haiishen McIntyre	Guard	6–2	165	Freshman	Harrisburg, Pennsylvania
12	Tré Duncan	Guard	5–11	195	Sophomore	Millersville, Maryland
13	Allan Chaney	Forward	6–9	235	R-Senior	Baltimore, Maryland
15	Lorenzo Cugini	Forward	6–6	220	Freshman	Stow, Ohio
20	Corey Law	Forward	6–6	215	R-Senior	Chesapeake, Virginia
21	Quincy Drye	Guard	6–2	185	Sophomore	Durham, North Carolina
22	Adam Weary	Guard	6–2	195	Freshman	Memphis, Tennessee
23	Jairus Simms	Guard	6–1	180	Senior	Winston-Salem, North Carolina
40	Landon Harris	Forward	6–5	215	Senior	Mocksville, North Carolina
41	Branimir Mikulic	Forward	6–8	225	Senior	Široki Brijeg, Croatia

== Schedule ==
Date time, TV	Opponent	Result	Record	Site (attendance) city, state
Exhibition
11/03/2012*; 7:00 pm	Mars Hill	W 96–62		Millis Center (1,218); High Point, NC
Regular season
11/09/2012*; 7:00 pm	UNC Greensboro	W 81–73	1–0	Millis Center (1,706); High Point, NC
11/13/2012*; 7:00 pm	at Appalachian State	W 86–64	2–0	George M. Holmes Convocation Center (1,102); Boone, NC
11/17/2012*; 7:00 pm	William & Mary	L 61–83	2–1	Millis Center (1,734); High Point, NC
11/21/2012*; 7:00 pm	St. Andrews (NC)	W 93–62	3–1	Millis Center (1,045); High Point, NC
11/25/2012*; 1:00 pm	at Indiana State	L 62–76	3–2	Hulman Center (5,487); Terre Haute, IN
11/29/2012*; 7:00 pm	at Western Michigan	L 53–54	3–3	University Arena (2,238); Kalamazoo, MI
12/02/2012*; 3:00 pm	Johnson & Wales	W 99–36	4–3	Millis Center (1,089); High Point, NC
12/05/2012*; 7:00 pm, ESPN3	at Wake Forest	L 60–71	4–4	LJVM Coliseum (6,822); Winston-Salem, NC
12/16/2012*; 3:00 pm	Western Michigan	L 64–70	4–5	Millis Center (1,104); High Point, NC
12/21/2012*; 7:00 pm	Eastern Kentucky	L 70–73	4–6	Millis Center (1,421); High Point, NC
12/28/2012*; 7:00 pm	at Chattanooga; Dr. Pepper Classic	L 61–68	4–7	McKenzie Arena (2,568); Chattanooga, TN
12/29/2012*; 4:30 pm	vs. Austin Peay; Dr. Pepper Classic	W 76–74	5–7	McKenzie Arena (2,534); Chattanooga, TN
01/05/2013; 2:00 pm	at Winthrop	W 74–61	6–7 (1–0)	Winthrop Coliseum (1,748); Rock Hill, SC
01/09/2013; 7:00 pm	at Radford	L 54–59	6–8 (1–1)	Dedmon Center (307); Radford, VA
01/12/2013; 7:00 pm	Gardner–Webb	W 70–64	7–8 (2–1)	Millis Center (1,604); High Point, NC
01/16/2013; 7:00 pm	Liberty	W 77–72 ^{2OT}	8–8 (3–1)	Millis Center (1,527); High Point, NC
01/19/2013; 5:30 pm	at Charleston Southern	L 75–83	8–9 (3–2)	CSU Field House (963); Charleston, SC
01/23/2013; 7:00 pm	VMI	W 96–69	9–9 (4–2)	Millis Center (1,306); High Point, NC
01/26/2013; 2:00 pm	at UNC Asheville	L 58–69	9–10 (4–3)	Kimmel Arena (2,109); Asheville, NC
01/30/2013; 7:00 pm	Longwood	W 88–60	10–10 (5–3)	Millis Center (1,127); High Point, NC
02/02/2013; 7:00 pm, ESPN3	Presbyterian	W 78–68	11–10 (6–3)	Millis Center (1,802); High Point, NC
02/06/2013; 7:00 pm	at Campbell	W 58–52	12–10 (7–3)	John W. Pope, Jr. Convocation Center (1,915); Buies Creek, NC
02/09/2013; 7:00 pm	Coastal Carolina	W 74–62	13–10 (8–3)	Millis Center (1,705); High Point, NC
02/13/2013; 7:00 pm	at Longwood	W 82–53	14–10 (9–3)	Willett Hall (873); Farmville, VA
02/16/2013; 6:00 pm, ESPN3	at Liberty	W 73–68	15–10 (10–3)	Vines Center (2,996); Lynchburg, VA
02/19/2013; 7:00 pm	at VMI	W 78–67	16–10 (11–3)	Cameron Hall (962); Lexington, VA
02/23/2013*; 7:00 pm	Morgan State; BracketBusters	L 68–75	16–11	Millis Center (1,714); High Point, NC
02/27/2013; 7:00 pm	Radford	L 58–63	16–12 (11–4)	Millis Center (1,302); High Point, NC
03/02/2013; 4:00 pm	Campbell	W 63–62	17–12 (12–4)	Millis Center (1,505); High Point, NC
2013 Big South Conference men's basketball tournament
03/07/2013; 8:30 pm	vs. Liberty; Quarterfinals	L 60–61	17–13	HTC Center (2,606); Conway, SC
2013 CIT
03/20/2013*; 10:30 pm	at UC Irvine; First Round	L 71–80	17–14	Bren Events Center (368); Irvine, CA
*Non-conference game. ^{#}Rankings from AP Poll. (#) Tournament seedings in parentheses. All times are in Eastern Time.
