= 2012–13 UNC Asheville Bulldogs men's basketball team =

American college basketball season

2012–13 UNC Asheville Bulldogs men's basketball
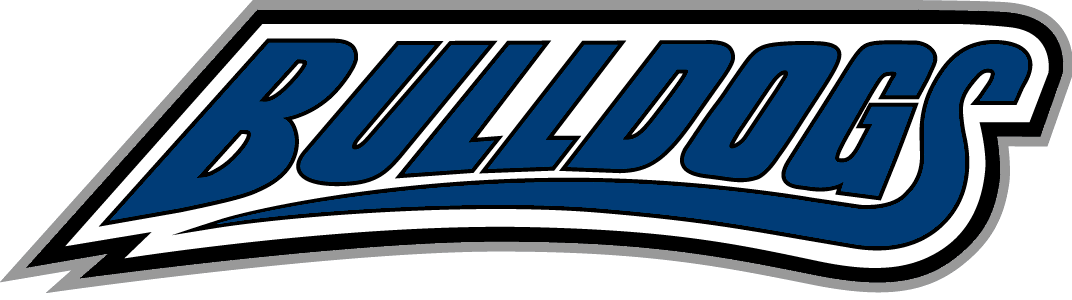
- Conference: Big South Conference
- South Division
- Record: 16–16 (10–6 Big South)
- Head coach: Ed Biedenbach (17th season)
- Assistant coaches: Nicholas McDevitt; Brett Carey; Dion Dacons
- Home arena: Kimmel Arena

2012–13 Big South men's basketball standings
	Conf.				Overall
Team	W		L	PCT	W		L	PCT
North
High Point	12	–	4	.750	17	–	14	.548
VMI	8	–	8	.500	14	–	17	.452
Radford	7	–	9	.438	13	–	19	.406
Campbell	7	–	9	.438	13	–	20	.394
Liberty †	6	–	10	.375	15	–	21	.417
Longwood	4	–	12	.250	8	–	25	.242
South
Charleston Southern	12	–	4	.750	19	–	13	.594
Gardner–Webb	11	–	5	.688	21	–	13	.618
UNC Asheville	10	–	6	.625	16	–	16	.500
Coastal Carolina	9	–	7	.563	14	–	15	.483
Winthrop	6	–	10	.375	14	–	17	.452
Presbyterian	4	–	12	.250	8	–	24	.250
† 2013 Big South tournament winner As of March 20, 2013; Rankings from AP Poll

The 2012–13 UNC Asheville Bulldogs men's basketball team represented the University of North Carolina at Asheville during the 2012–13 NCAA Division I men's basketball season. The Bulldogs, led by 17th year head coach Ed Biedenbach, played their home games at Kimmel Arena and were members of the South Division of the Big South Conference. They finished the season 16–16, 10–6 in Big South play to finish in third place in the South Division. They lost in the first round of the Big South tournament to Longwood.

Head coach Ed Biedenbach resigned at the end of the season to take an assistants job at UNC Wilmington.

== Roster ==
Number	Name	Position	Height	Weight	Year	Hometown
0	Zack Davis	Guard	6–3	185	Freshman	Charlotte, North Carolina
2	Marcus Neely	Guard	6–4	205	Freshman	Fort Lauderdale, Florida
3	Drew Combs	Guard	5–10	165	Freshman	Wilmington, North Carolina
5	Jaron Lane	Guard	6–4	170	Senior	Greenville, North Carolina
11	Josh Seligson	Guard	6–3	205	Junior	Raleigh, North Carolina
14	Mike Bedulskis	Forward	6–8	220	Freshman	Vilnius, Lithuania
15	Jeremy Atkinson	Forward	6–4	210	Senior	Elm City, North Carolina
22	Corey Littlejohn	Guard	6–3	180	Sophomore	Columbia, South Carolina
23	Keith Hornsby	Guard	6–4	190	Sophomore	Williamsburg, Virginia
31	Sam Hughes	Forward	6–4	205	Freshman	Battleboro, North Carolina
32	Will Weeks	Forward	6–6	220	Freshman	Charlotte, North Carolina
33	D.J. Cunningham	Center	6–10	240	Junior	Waterford, Ohio
35	Jon Nwannunu	Forward	6–8	225	Senior	Merrillville, Indiana
42	Alex Biggerstaff	Forward	6–4	185	Freshman	Burnsville, North Carolina
45	Jaleel Roberts	Center	7–0	220	Sophomore	Evans, Georgia
55	Trent Meyer	Guard	6–2	165	Junior	Fort Lauderdale, Florida

== Schedule ==
Date time, TV	Rank^{#}	Opponent^{#}	Result	Record	Site (attendance) city, state
Exhibition
11/05/2012*; 7:00 pm		Brevard	W 91–60		Kimmel Arena (1,475); Asheville, NC
Regular season
11/09/2012*; 7:00 pm		Western Carolina	W 71–61	1–0	Kimmel Arena (2,759); Asheville, NC
11/11/2012*; 2:00 pm		at UNC Wilmington	L 59–67	1–1	Trask Coliseum (3,052); Wilmington, NC
11/15/2012*; 12:30 pm, ESPNU		vs. Tennessee; Puerto Rico Tip-Off Quarterfinals	L 68–75	1–2	Coliseo Rubén Rodríguez (N/A); Bayamón, Puerto Rico
11/16/2012*; 1:00 pm, ESPN3		vs. Akron; Puerto Rico Tip-Off	L 63–82	1–3	Coliseo Rubén Rodríguez (N/A); Bayamón, Puerto Rico
11/18/2012*; 11:00 am, ESPNU		vs. Providence; Puerto Rico Tip-Off	L 67–72	1–4	Coliseo Rubén Rodríguez (N/A); Bayamón, Puerto Rico
11/23/2012*; 7:00 pm, ESPN3		at No. 16 NC State	L 80–82	1–5	PNC Arena (17,228); Raleigh, NC
11/29/2012*; 7:00 pm		USC Upstate	L 71–73	1–6	Kimmel Arena (1,542); Asheville, NC
12/08/2012*; 4:30 pm		Montreat	W 85–51	2–6	Kimmel Arena (1,445); Asheville, NC
12/12/2012*; 7:00 pm		Lenoir–Rhyne	W 66–55	3–6	Kimmel Arena (1,689); Asheville, NC
12/15/2012*; 12:00 pm, BTN		at No. 7 Ohio State	L 72–90	3–7	Value City Arena (15,041); Columbus, OH
12/18/2012*; 12:00 pm		at Northeastern	W 79–73	4–7	Matthews Arena (2,134); Boston, MA
12/21/2012*; 7:30 pm		at St. John's	W 72–65	5–7	Carnesecca Arena (4,417); Queens, NY
12/30/2012*; 2:00 pm		Bluefield	W 95–66	6–7	Kimmel Arena (1,540); Asheville, NC
01/02/2013*; 7:30 pm		at Charlotte	L 63–71 ^{OT}	6–8	Dale F. Halton Arena (4,772); Charlotte, NC
01/05/2013; 6:00 pm, ESPN3		at Liberty	W 83–69	7–8 (1–0)	Vines Center (1,688); Lynchburg, VA
01/09/2013; 7:00 pm		at Gardner–Webb	L 71–78	7–9 (1–1)	Paul Porter Arena (2,030); Boiling Springs, NC
01/12/2013; 2:00 pm		Radford	W 79–61	8–9 (2–1)	Kimmel Arena (1,965); Asheville, NC
01/16/2013; 7:30 pm		at Charleston Southern	L 68–74	8–10 (2–2)	CSU Field House (1,108); North Charleston, SC
01/19/2013; 4:30 pm		Longwood	W 68–65	9–10 (3–2)	Kimmel Arena (2,415); Asheville, NC
01/23/2013; 7:00 pm		Coastal Carolina	W 63–60	10–10 (4–2)	Kimmel Arena (1,841); Asheville, NC
01/26/2013; 2:00 pm		High Point	W 69–58	11–10 (5–2)	Kimmel Arena (2,109); Asheville, NC
01/30/2013; 7:00 pm		at Presbyterian	W 77–74	12–10 (6–2)	Templeton Physical Education Center (706); Clinton, SC
02/02/2013; 3:30 pm		at Campbell	W 78–61	13–10 (7–2)	John W. Pope, Jr. Convocation Center (2,884); Buies Creek, NC
02/06/2013; 7:00 pm		Winthrop	W 69–56	14–10 (8–2)	Kimmel Arena (1,661); Asheville, NC
02/08/2013; 7:00 pm, ESPNU		at VMI	W 90–79	15–10 (9–2)	Cameron Hall (4,117); Lexington, VA
02/13/2013; 7:00 pm, ESPN3		Gardner–Webb	L 65–67	15–11 (9–3)	Kimmel Arena (1,771); Asheville, NC
02/16/2013; 2:00 pm, ESPN3		Charleston Southern	L 65–73	15–12 (9–4)	Kimmel Arena (2,498); Asheville, NC
02/19/2013; 7:00 pm		at Coastal Carolina	L 64–65	15–13 (9–5)	HTC Center (2,424); Conway, SC
02/23/2013*; 4:30 pm		Jacksonville State; BracketBusters	L 69–71	15–14	Kimmel Arena (2,589); Asheville, NC
02/27/2013; 7:00 pm		Presbyterian	W 74–62	16–14 (10–5)	Kimmel Arena (1,547); Asheville, NC
03/02/2013; 4:00 pm, ESPN3		at Winthrop	L 61–70	16–15 (10–6)	Winthrop Coliseum (1,773); Rock Hill, SC
2013 Big South Conference men's basketball tournament
03/05/2013; 2:45 pm		vs. Longwood; First Round	L 72–87	16–16	HTC Center (1,858); Conway, SC
*Non-conference game. ^{#}Rankings from AP Poll. (#) Tournament seedings in parentheses. All times are in Eastern Time.
