= 2012–13 Winthrop Eagles men's basketball team =

American college basketball season

2012–13 Winthrop Eagles men's basketball
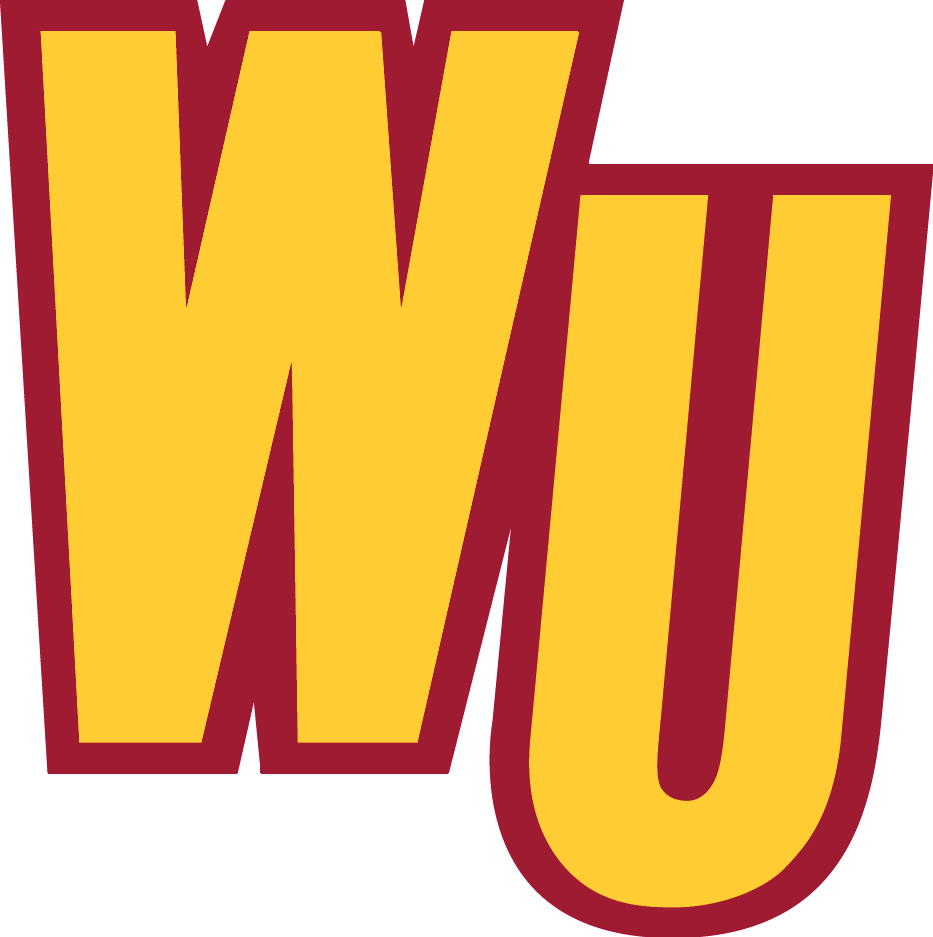
- Conference: Big South Conference
- South Division
- Record: 14–17 (6–10 Big South)
- Head coach: Pat Kelsey (1st season)
- Assistant coaches: Mark Prosser; Brian Thornton; Tony Hanson
- Home arena: Winthrop Coliseum

2012–13 Big South men's basketball standings
	Conf.				Overall
Team	W		L	PCT	W		L	PCT
North
High Point	12	–	4	.750	17	–	14	.548
VMI	8	–	8	.500	14	–	17	.452
Radford	7	–	9	.438	13	–	19	.406
Campbell	7	–	9	.438	13	–	20	.394
Liberty †	6	–	10	.375	15	–	21	.417
Longwood	4	–	12	.250	8	–	25	.242
South
Charleston Southern	12	–	4	.750	19	–	13	.594
Gardner–Webb	11	–	5	.688	21	–	13	.618
UNC Asheville	10	–	6	.625	16	–	16	.500
Coastal Carolina	9	–	7	.563	14	–	15	.483
Winthrop	6	–	10	.375	14	–	17	.452
Presbyterian	4	–	12	.250	8	–	24	.250
† 2013 Big South tournament winner As of March 20, 2013; Rankings from AP Poll

The 2012–13 Winthrop Eagles men's basketball team represented Winthrop University during the 2012–13 NCAA Division I men's basketball season. The Eagles, led by first year head coach Pat Kelsey, played their home games at the Winthrop Coliseum and were members of the South Division of the Big South Conference. They finished the season 14–17, 6–10 in Big South play to finish in fifth place in the South Division. They lost in the quarterfinals of the Big South tournament to Charleston Southern.

== Roster ==
Number	Name	Position	Height	Weight	Year	Hometown
1	Brandon Vega	Guard	5–10	160	Junior	Miami, Florida
2	Gideon Gamble	Guard	6–7	195	Senior	Atlanta, Georgia
3	Andre Smith	Guard	5–10	180	Sophomore	Tampa, Florida
4	Joab Jerome	Forward	6–5	197	Junior	Marietta, Georgia
10	Keon Moore	Guard	6–5	190	Sophomore	Windsor, North Carolina
11	Reggie King	Guard	6–2	215	Senior	Novelty, Ohio
12	James Bourne	Forward	6–8	240	Sophomore	Alexandria, Virginia
14	Shola Diop	Forward/Center	6–9	230	Senior	Sydney, Australia
15	Derrick Henry	Guard	6–3	200	Sophomore	Covington, Georgia
20	Donovan Carter	Forward	6–5	215	Junior	Ladson, South Carolina
22	Steve Johnson	Center	6–8	225	Junior	Fayetteville, North Carolina
23	Larry Brown	Forward	6–6	210	Sophomore	Red Springs, North Carolina
34	Christian Farmer	Guard	6–5	190	Junior	Charlotte, North Carolina

== Schedule ==
Date time, TV	Opponent	Result	Record	Site (attendance) city, state
Regular season
11/10/2012*; 4:00 pm	St. Andrews (NC)	W 80–48	1–0	Winthrop Coliseum (2,626); Rock Hill, SC
11/13/2012*; 7:00 pm	at Indiana State	L 55–66	1–1	Hulman Center (4,916); Terre Haute, IN
11/17/2012*; 2:00 pm	VCU	L 54–90	1–2	Winthrop Coliseum (1,726); Rock Hill, SC
11/20/2012*; 7:00 pm	Lenoir–Rhyne	W 59–35	2–2	Winthrop Coliseum (1,060); Rock Hill, SC
11/28/2012*; 7:00 pm	at Wofford	L 55–70	2–3	Benjamin Johnson Arena (787); Spartanburg, SC
12/01/2012*; 4:00 pm	at James Madison	L 61–71	2–4	JMU Convocation Center (3,021); Harrisonburg, VA
12/04/2012*; 7:00 pm	Brevard	W 77–54	3–4	Winthrop Coliseum (1,483); Rock Hill, SC
12/15/2012*; 2:00 pm	at Ohio	W 50–49	4–4	Convocation Center (5,421); Athens, OH
12/18/2012*; 7:00 pm, BTN	at No. 7 Ohio State	L 55–65	4–5	Value City Arena (13,707); Columbus, OH
12/22/2012*; 8:00 pm	at Auburn	W 74–67	5–5	Auburn Arena (5,156); Auburn, AL
12/30/2012*; 2:00 pm	Hampton	W 50–43	6–5	Winthrop Coliseum (1,421); Rock Hill, SC
01/02/2013*; 7:00 pm	North Carolina Central	L 57–64	6–6	Winthrop Coliseum (1,010); Rock Hill, SC
01/05/2013; 2:00 pm	High Point	L 61–74	6–7 (0–1)	Winthrop Coliseum (1,748); Rock Hill, SC
01/09/2013; 7:30 pm	at Charleston Southern	L 63–75	6–8 (0–2)	CSU Field House (948); North Charleston, SC
01/12/2013; 1:00 pm	at VMI	L 54–72	6–9 (0–3)	Cameron Hall (1,235); Lexington, VA
01/16/2013; 7:00 pm	Presbyterian	W 62–51	7–9 (1–3)	Winthrop Coliseum (1,458); Rock Hill, SC
01/19/2013; 1:00 pm, ESPN3	at Campbell	L 59–63	7–10 (1–4)	John W. Pope, Jr. Convocation Center (2,518); Buies Creek, NC
01/23/2013; 7:00 pm	Gardner–Webb	W 61–55	8–10 (2–4)	Winthrop Coliseum (1,356); Rock Hill, SC
01/26/2013; 4:00 pm	at Radford	L 57–58	8–11 (2–5)	Dedmon Center (2,109); Radford, VA
01/30/2013; 7:00 pm	Coastal Carolina	W 61–48	9–11 (3–5)	Winthrop Coliseum (1,819); Rock Hill, SC
02/02/2013; 7:00 pm	Liberty	W 66–56	10–11 (4–5)	Winthrop Coliseum (2,168); Rock Hill, SC
02/06/2013; 7:00 pm	at UNC Asheville	L 56–69	10–12 (4–6)	Kimmel Arena (1,661); Asheville, NC
02/09/2013; 4:00 pm	Longwood	L 56–62	10–13 (4–7)	Winthrop Coliseum (1,830); Rock Hill, SC
02/13/2013; 7:00 pm	Charleston Southern	W 70–65	11–13 (5–7)	Winthrop Coliseum (1,212); Rock Hill, SC
02/16/2013; 7:00 pm	at Presbyterian	L 57–64	11–14 (5–8)	Templeton Physical Education Center (788); Clinton, SC
02/19/2013; 7:00 pm	at Gardner–Webb	L 52–65	11–15 (5–9)	Paul Porter Arena (1,502); Boiling Springs, NC
02/23/2013*; 4:00 pm	Southeastern Louisiana; BracketBusters	W 66–52	12–15	Winthrop Coliseum (2,410); Rock Hill, SC
02/27/2013; 7:00 pm	at Coastal Carolina	L 54–73	12–16 (5–10)	HTC Center (2,635); Conway, SC
03/02/2013; 4:00 pm, ESPN3	UNC Asheville	W 70–61	13–16 (6–10)	Winthrop Coliseum (1,773); Rock Hill, SC
2013 Big South Conference men's basketball tournament
03/05/2013; 12:00 pm	vs. Radford; First Round	W 60–58 ^{OT}	14–16	HTC Center (1,858); Conway, SC
03/07/2013; 12:00 pm	vs. Charleston Southern; Quarterfinals	L 47–54	14–17	HTC Center (2,105); Conway, SC
*Non-conference game. ^{#}Rankings from AP Poll. (#) Tournament seedings in parentheses. All times are in Eastern Time.
