= 2013 Big South Conference men's basketball tournament =

- 2013 Big South Championship logo
- Classification: Division I
- Season: 2012–13
- Teams: 12
- Site: HTC Center; Conway, South Carolina
- Champions: Liberty (3rd title)
- Winning coach: Dale Layer (1st title)
- MVP: John Caleb-Sanders

2012–13 Big South men's basketball standings
	Conf.				Overall
Team	W		L	PCT	W		L	PCT
North
High Point	12	–	4	.750	17	–	14	.548
VMI	8	–	8	.500	14	–	17	.452
Radford	7	–	9	.438	13	–	19	.406
Campbell	7	–	9	.438	13	–	20	.394
Liberty †	6	–	10	.375	15	–	21	.417
Longwood	4	–	12	.250	8	–	25	.242
South
Charleston Southern	12	–	4	.750	19	–	13	.594
Gardner–Webb	11	–	5	.688	21	–	13	.618
UNC Asheville	10	–	6	.625	16	–	16	.500
Coastal Carolina	9	–	7	.563	14	–	15	.483
Winthrop	6	–	10	.375	14	–	17	.452
Presbyterian	4	–	12	.250	8	–	24	.250
† 2013 Big South tournament winner As of March 20, 2013; Rankings from AP Poll

The 2013 Big South men's basketball tournament was the postseason men's basketball tournament for the Big South Conference that took place from March 5–10, 2013, at the brand new HTC Center in Conway, South Carolina. Both semifinal games were broadcast on ESPN3, and the championship game was televised on ESPN2.

Both the men's and women's tournaments were held together at the HTC Center. The conference hadn't held combined men’s and women’s tournaments since 2001–02 when both events were played at the Roanoke Civic Center The tournament was won by the fifth-seeded North Division Liberty Flames, their third conference title, and first since 2004. With four wins in the tournament, including two over both divisions' top seeds, Liberty won the conference's automatic bid to the NCAA tournament, becoming only the second 20-loss team in the tournament's history (the other being Coppin State in 2007–08).

== Format ==
With the addition of Longwood, and Presbyterian completing its Division I transition, all 12 teams were eligible for the 2013 tournament. Seeding was decided by divisions - the top two teams with the best overall conference records in each division received the top four seeds in the championship and first-round byes. The remaining seeds were determined based on division finish. In the event of a tie for a particular seed, the seed was determined within each division.

== Bracket ==
First round March 5
4S	Coastal Carolina	61
5N	Liberty	78
3N	Campbell	81*
6S	Presbyterian	73
4N	Radford	58
5S	Winthrop	60*
3S	UNC-Asheville	72
6N	Longwood	87

Quarterfinals; March 7
1N	High Point	60
5N	Liberty	61
2S	Gardner-Webb	71
3N	Campbell	57
1S	Charleston Southern	54
5S	Winthrop	47
2N	VMI	90
6N	Longwood	86

Semifinals; March 9 ESPN3
5N	Liberty	65
2S	Gardner-Webb	62
1S	Charleston Southern	71
2N	VMI	65

Championship; March 10; ESPN2
5N	Liberty	87
1S	Charleston Southern	76

* Indicates overtime victory
