= Robbie Laing =

American college basketball coach (born 1958)

Current position
- Title: Assistant coach
- Team: UCF
- Conference: Big 12

Biographical details
- Born: March 5, 1958 (age 68); Hancock, Michigan, U.S.

Playing career
- 1977: Vanderbilt
- 1978–1979: Okaloosa-Walton CC
- 1979–1980: Seminole CC
- 1980–1982: Troy

Coaching career (HC unless noted)
- 1981–1982: Montgomery Academy
- 1982–1984: Troy (asst.)
- 1984–1986: Georgia Southern (asst.)
- 1986–1987: Western Kentucky (asst.)
- 1987–1993: Georgia Southern (asst.)
- 1993–1994: Clemson (asst.)
- 1994–1996: Auburn (asst.)
- 1996–1999: Jones County CC
- 1999–2000: Southern Miss (asst.)
- 2000–2002: Kansas State (asst.)
- 2003–2013: Campbell
- 2014–2016: Florida Atlantic (asst.)
- 2016–present: UCF (asst.)

Head coaching record
- Overall: 114–185 (.381)

Accomplishments and honors

Championships
- Atlantic Sun regular season (2010)

Awards
- Atlantic Sun Coach of the Year (2010)

Robert Alan Laing (born March 5, 1958) is an American college basketball coach, currently an assistant at the University of Central Florida. He had been the head men's basketball coach at Campbell University from 2003 to 2013. In March 2013, Laing was fired as head coach at Campbell, finishing with a 114–185 record. He was hired as an assistant under Michael Curry at Florida Atlantic in May 2014.

== Head coaching record ==
Record table
Season	Team	Overall	Conference	Standing	Postseason
Campbell Fighting Camels (Atlantic Sun Conference) (2003–2011)
2003–04	Campbell	3–24	3–17	11th	
2004–05	Campbell	2–25	0–20	11th	
2005–06	Campbell	10–19	9–11	8th	
2006–07	Campbell	14–17	7–11	T–7th	
2007–08	Campbell	10–20	5–11	T–9th	
2008–09	Campbell	14–16	11–9	T–5th	
2009–10	Campbell	19–11	14–6	T–1st	
2010–11	Campbell	12–19	6–14	T–8th	
Campbell Fighting Camels (Big South Conference) (2011–2013)
2011–12	Campbell	16–11	10–5	3rd	
2012–13	Campbell	13–20	7–9	3rd	
Campbell:		114–185 (.381)	72–113 (.389)		
Total:		114–185 (.381)			
National champion Postseason invitational champion Conference regular season champion Conference regular season and conference tournament champion Division regular season champion Division regular season and conference tournament champion Conference tournament champion
