= 2012–13 Presbyterian Blue Hose men's basketball team =

American college basketball season

2012–13 Presbyterian Blue Hose men's basketball
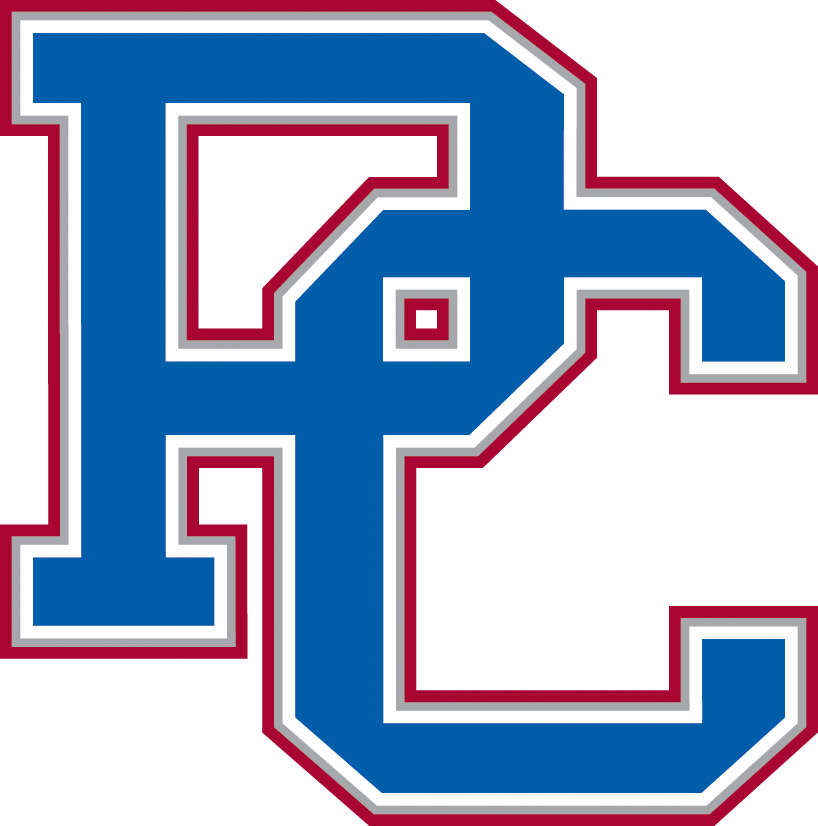
- Conference: Big South Conference
- South Division
- Record: 8–24 (4–12 Big South)
- Head coach: Gregg Nibert (24th season)
- Assistant coaches: Sean Dixon; Brooks Savage; Justin Smith
- Home arena: Templeton Physical Education Center

2012–13 Big South men's basketball standings
	Conf.				Overall
Team	W		L	PCT	W		L	PCT
North
High Point	12	–	4	.750	17	–	14	.548
VMI	8	–	8	.500	14	–	17	.452
Radford	7	–	9	.438	13	–	19	.406
Campbell	7	–	9	.438	13	–	20	.394
Liberty †	6	–	10	.375	15	–	21	.417
Longwood	4	–	12	.250	8	–	25	.242
South
Charleston Southern	12	–	4	.750	19	–	13	.594
Gardner–Webb	11	–	5	.688	21	–	13	.618
UNC Asheville	10	–	6	.625	16	–	16	.500
Coastal Carolina	9	–	7	.563	14	–	15	.483
Winthrop	6	–	10	.375	14	–	17	.452
Presbyterian	4	–	12	.250	8	–	24	.250
† 2013 Big South tournament winner As of March 20, 2013; Rankings from AP Poll

The 2012–13 Presbyterian Blue Hose men's basketball team represented Presbyterian College during the 2012–13 NCAA Division I men's basketball season. The Blue Hose, led by 24th year head coach Gregg Nibert, played their home games at the Templeton Physical Education Center and were members of the South Division of the Big South Conference. They finished the season 8–24, 4–12 in Big South play to finish in last place in the South Division. They lost in the first round of the Big South tournament to Campbell.

== Roster ==
Number	Name	Position	Height	Weight	Year	Hometown
1	Joshua Clyburn	Forward	6–8	221	Junior	Charlotte, North Carolina
2	Shea Jones	Guard	6–1	165	Freshman	Weston, Florida
3	Matthew Citron	Forward	6–7	215	Freshman	Atlanta, Georgia
4	Austin Anderson	Guard	6–5	165	Freshman	Piedmont, South Carolina
10	Russell McCray	Guard	5–11	175	Sophomore	Columbia, South Carolina
5	Ryan Hargrave	Forward	6–6	235	Senior	Taylorsville, North Carolina
13	William Truss	Center	6–7	257	Sophomore	Birmingham, Alabama
20	Ryan McTavish	Guard	6–5	202	Sophomore	Mt. Airy, Maryland
21	Jordan Downing	Guard	6–5	200	Sophomore	Huntersville, North Carolina
24	Khalid Mutakabbir	Guard	6–4	190	Senior	Suwanee, Georgia
25	Jarvis Thibodeaux	Forward	6–8	205	Freshman	Houston, Texas
31	Mac Lake	Forward	6–3	181	Sophomore	Prosperity, South Carolina
33	Eric Washington	Guard	5–10	173	Sophomore	Columbia, South Carolina
44	Jake Campbell	Center	7–0	245	Freshman	Centerville, Ohio

== Schedule ==
Date time, TV	Opponent	Result	Record	Site (attendance) city, state
Exhibition
11/06/2012*; 7:00 pm	Erskine	W 71–66		Templeton Center; Clinton, SC
Regular season
11/12/2012*; 7:00 pm, ESPN3	at Clemson	L 44–77	0–1	Littlejohn Coliseum (4,500); Clemson, SC
11/14/2012*; 7:00 pm, ESPN3	at Georgia Tech	L 38–52	0–2	McCamish Pavilion (5,733); Atlanta, GA
11/18/2012*; 3:00 pm	No. 15 Creighton; Las Vegas Invitational	L 58–87	0–3	CenturyLink Center Omaha (16,801); Omaha, NE
11/20/2012*; 8:00 pm, ESPN3	at Wisconsin; Las Vegas Invitational	L 43–88	0–4	Kohl Center (16,656); Madison, WI
11/23/2012*; 4:30 pm	vs. Cornell; Las Vegas Invitational	L 55–89	0–5	Orleans Arena (200); Paradise, NV
11/24/2012*; 3:00 pm	vs. Florida A&M; Las Vegas Invitational	L 55–69	0–6	Orleans Arena (200); Paradise, NV
11/27/2012*; 7:00 pm	Toccoa Falls	W 97–38	1–6	Templeton Center (710); Clinton, SC
12/09/2012*; 3:00 pm	at Furman	L 57–81	1–7	Timmons Arena (909); Greenville, SC
12/12/2012*; 7:00 pm	North Greenville	W 91–83	2–7	Templeton Center (452); Clinton, SC
12/15/2012*; 7:00 pm	Jacksonville State	L 59–66 ^{OT}	2–8	Templeton Center (504); Clinton, SC
12/18/2012*; 7:00 pm	at Tennessee	L 62–78	2–9	Thompson–Boling Arena (14,495); Knoxville, TN
12/22/2012*; 2:00 pm	at Appalachian State	L 70–78	2–10	Holmes Center (878); Boone, NC
12/29/2012*; 1:00 pm, ESPN3	at South Carolina	L 60–76	2–11	Colonial Life Arena (7,344); Columbia, SC
01/01/2013*; 7:00 pm	Montreat	W 77–35	3–11	Templeton Center (234); Clinton, SC
01/05/2013; 7:00 pm	VMI	L 77–86	3–12 (0–1)	Templeton Center (862); Clinton, SC
01/09/2013; 7:00 pm	at Coastal Carolina	L 43–61	3–13 (0–2)	HTC Center (2,194); Conway, SC
01/12/2013; 7:45 pm	at Campbell	L 46–62	3–14 (0–3)	Templeton Center (1,197); Clinton, SC
01/16/2013; 7:00 pm	at Winthrop	L 51–62	3–15 (0–4)	Winthrop Coliseum (1,458); Rock Hill, SC
01/19/2013; 7:00 pm	Liberty	W 68–60	4–15 (1–4)	Templeton Center (1,153); Clinton, SC
01/23/2013; 7:00 pm	Charleston Southern	L 59–79	4–16 (1–5)	Templeton Center (692); Clinton, SC
01/26/2013; 2:00 pm	at Longwood	W 82–71	5–16 (2–5)	Willett Hall (1,466); Farmville, VA
01/30/2013; 7:00 pm	UNC Asheville	L 74–77	5–17 (2–6)	Templeton Center (706); Clinton, SC
02/02/2013; 7:00 pm, ESPN3	at High Point	L 68–78	5–18 (2–7)	Millis Center (1,802); High Point, NC
02/06/2013; 7:00 pm	Gardner–Webb	W 57–54	6–18 (3–7)	Templeton Center (595); Clinton, SC
02/09/2013; 2:00 pm	at Radford	L 65–76	6–19 (3–8)	Dedmon Center (1,412); Radford, VA
02/13/2013; 7:00 pm	Coastal Carolina	L 53–60	6–20 (3–9)	Templeton Center (710); Clinton, SC
02/16/2013; 7:00 pm	Winthrop	W 64–57	7–20 (4–9)	Templeton Center (788); Clinton, SC
02/19/2013; 7:30 pm	at Charleston Southern	L 54–72	7–21 (4–10)	CSU Field House; Charleston, SC
02/23/2013*; 7:45 pm	The Citadel; BracketBusters	W 68–65	8–21	Templeton Center (1,780); Clinton, SC
02/27/2013; 7:00 pm	at UNC Asheville	L 62–74	8–22 (4–11)	Kimmel Arena (1,547); Asheville, NC
03/02/2013; 4:30 pm	at Gardner–Webb	L 57–76	8–23 (4–12)	Paul Porter Arena (2,245); Boiling Springs, NC
2013 Big South Conference men's basketball tournament
03/05/2013; 6:00 pm	vs. Campbell; First Round	L 73–81 ^{OT}	8–24	HTC Center (3,266); Conway, SC
*Non-conference game. ^{#}Rankings from AP Poll. (#) Tournament seedings in parentheses. All times are in Eastern Time.
