= Las Vegas Invitational (basketball) =

College basketball tournament in the United States

- Sport: College basketball
- Founded: 2003
- No. of teams: 8
- Country: United States
- Venue: Orleans Arena
- Most titles: Illinois (2); Kansas (2)
- Broadcaster: Fox Sports

The Las Vegas Invitational was an 8 team college basketball tournament held during Thanksgiving of NCAA Division I men's college basketball season annually since 2003. The Tournament was originally held in the gymnasium of Valley High School, until moving to the new Orleans Arena in 2006.

The tourney launched with local car dealer Findlay Toyota as its sponsor. From 2006 to 2013 the sponsor of the tournament was IBN Sports. Continental Tire is the current sponsor of the tournament. Fox Sports purchased the event and the Las Vegas Classic in 2015.

== Brackets ==
* – Denotes overtime period

=== 2022 ===
Semifinals
November 25
UC Irvine	83
Nicholls	56
November 25
New Mexico State	90
San Diego	77

Championship Game
November 26
UC Irvine	85
New Mexico State	68
Consolation Game
November 26
Nicholls	62
San Diego	60

=== 2021 ===
The 2021 Las Vegas Invitational Basketball Tournament at the Orleans Hotel & Casino included: UAB, New Mexico, San Francisco, and Towson.

Semifinals
November 25 (FS1)
San Francisco	71
Towson	61
November 25 (FS1)
UAB	86
New Mexico	73

Championship Game
November 26 (FS1)
San Francisco	63
UAB	61
Consolation Game
November 26 (FS2)
Towson	73
New Mexico	58

=== 2019 ===
Third Round
November 28 (FS1)
12	Texas Tech	61
13	Iowa	72
November 28 (FS1)
4	San Diego State	83
9	Creighton	52

Championship Round
November 29 (FS1)
13	Iowa	73
12	San Diego State	83
3rd Place Game
November 29 (FS1)
12	Texas Tech	76
9	Creighton	83 OT

=== 2018 ===
Teams:

Third Round
November 22 (FS1)
7	North Carolina	89
Texas	92
November 22 (FS1)
11	Michigan State	87
17	UCLA	67

Championship Round
November 23 (FOX)
Texas	68
11	Michigan State	78
3rd Place Game
November 23 (FOX)
7	North Carolina	94
17	UCLA	78

=== 2017 ===
Third Round
November 23 (FS1)
15	Xavier	83
George Washington	64
November 23 (FS1)
Arizona State	92
Kansas State	90

Championship Round
November 24 (FOX)
15	Xavier	86
Arizona State	102
3rd Place Game
November 24 (FS1)
George Washington	59
Kansas State	67

Third Round
November 23
Hampton	76
Northern Arizona	66
November 23
Rider	90
UC Irvine	82

Championship Round
November 25
Hampton	80
Rider	94
3rd Place Game
November 25
Northern Arizona	71
UC Irvine	77

=== 2016 ===
Third Round; November 24; Fox Sports 1
8	Arizona	69
Santa Clara	61
Butler	76
Vanderbilt	66

Championship Round; November 25; Fox Sports 1
8	Arizona	65
Butler	69
3rd Place Game; Fox Sports 1
Vanderbilt	76
Santa Clara	66

Third Round; November 24
Bucknell	84
Norfolk State	58
Sacred Heart	59
Northern Colorado	81

Championship Round; November 25
Bucknell	75
Northern Colorado	63
3rd Place Game
Sacred Heart	61
Norfolk State	59

=== 2015 ===
Third Round
November 26 (FS1)
Richmond	59
West Virginia	67
November 26 (FS1)
14	California	58
San Diego State	72

Championship Round
November 27 (FS1)
West Virginia	72
San Diego State	50
Third place
November 27 (FS1)
Richmond	94
14	California	90

November 26
Arkansas–Little Rock	69
East Carolina	46

November 26
Bethune–Cookman	70
Stetson	83

November 27
East Carolina	93
Stetson	73

November 27
Bethune–Cookman	46
Sam Houston State	71

Note:

- Arkansas Little Rock will only Participate on Day 1
- On November 27 East Carolina will play winner of Bethune–Cookman/Stetson, Sam Houston State will play loser of Bethune–Cookman/Stetson

=== 2014 ===
The Tournament went back to the traditional format, There will be two brackets

Third Round; November 27; Fox Sports 1
Illinois	88
Indiana State	62
Baylor	71
Memphis	47

Championship Round; November 28; Fox Sports 1
Illinois	62
Baylor	54
3rd Place Game; Fox Sports 1
Indiana State	62
Memphis	72

Third Round; November 27
Austin Peay	79
Brown	58
Stephen F. Austin	73
Prairie View A&M	61

Championship Round; November 28
Austin Peay	62
Stephen F. Austin	83
3rd Place Game
Brown	81
Prairie View A&M	71

=== 2013 ===
The tournament's championship format was changed to a four-round round robin this year, with the final two rounds being played in Las Vegas. UCLA and Missouri were the co-champions of the tournament, both teams finishing with a 4-0 record; Kyle Anderson (UCLA) was the tournament's MVP.

Third Round
IUPUI
Gardner–Webb	61

Third Round
Chattanooga	75
Morehead State	88

Third Round
#19 UCLA	105
Nevada	84

Third Round
Northwestern	67
Missouri	78

Championship Round
Chattanooga	87
IUPUI	76

Championship Round
Morehead State	82
Gardner–Webb	86*

Championship Round
Nevada	70
Missouri	83

Championship Round
Northwestern	79
#19 UCLA	95

All-tournament team

- Gardner–Webb: Isaiah Ivey
- Morehead State: Angelo Warner
- Chattanooga: Z. Mason
- IUPUI: Ja'rob McCallum
- Missouri: Jordan Clarkson, Jabari Brown
- Nevada: Deonte Burton
- UCLA: Jordan Adams, Zach LaVine
- Northwestern: Jershon Cobb

Tournament MVP: Kyle Anderson, UCLA

=== 2012 participants and bracket ===
- Arizona State
- Arkansas
- Creighton
- Wisconsin
- Cornell
- Longwood
- Florida A&M
- Presbyterian

Semifinals; November 25
Arizona State	83
Arkansas	68
12	Creighton	84
Wisconsin	74

Championship; November 26
Arizona State	73
12	Creighton	87
3rd Place Game
Arkansas	70
Wisconsin	77

=== 2011 participants and bracket ===
- USC
- UNLV
- North Carolina
- South Carolina
- Cal Poly
- Mississippi Valley State
- Morgan State
- Tennessee State

Semifinals; November 25
USC	55
UNLV	66
1	North Carolina	87
South Carolina	62

Championship; November 26
UNLV	90
1	North Carolina	80
3rd Place Game
USC	66
South Carolina	63

=== 2010 participants and bracket ===
- Arizona
- Kansas
- Santa Clara
- Ohio
- Bethune–Cookman
- Northern Colorado
- Texas A&M–Corpus Christi
- Santa Clara
- Valparaiso

Semifinals
Arizona	82
Santa Clara	59
6	Kansas	64
Ohio	41

Championship
Arizona	49
6	Kansas	87
3rd Place Game
Ohio	78
Santa Clara	72

=== 2009 ===
==== Campus Round ====
November 14
Oklahoma State	86
Seattle	64

November 18
Oklahoma State	93
Southern	61

November 21
Utah	88
Southern	48

November 21
Illinois	94
Presbyterian	48

November 22
Bradley	56
Wofford	54

November 24
Seattle	77
Utah	74

November 24
Illinois	78
Wofford	64

November 24
Bradley	71
Presbyterian	58

===== Championship Rounds =====
Semifinals; November 27
Oklahoma State	68
Bradley	57
Utah	60
Illinois	58

Championship; November 28
Oklahoma State	77
Utah	55
3rd Place Game; November 28
Bradley	72
Illinois	68

Semifinals; November 27
Wofford	66
Southern	66
Seattle	67
Presbyterian	63

Championship; November 28
Seattle	83
Wofford	84
3rd Place Game; November 28
Southern	69
Presbyterian	71

=== 2008 participants and bracket ===
- Kansas State
- Kentucky
- Iowa
- West Virginia
- Delaware State
- Longwood
- Oakland
- Southeast Missouri State

Semifinals
Kentucky	74
Kansas State	72
Iowa	68
West Virginia	87

Championship
Kentucky	54
West Virginia	43
3rd Place Game
Iowa	65
Kansas State	63

=== 2007 participants and bracket ===
- BYU
- North Carolina
- Louisville
- Old Dominion
- Hartford
- Iona
- Jackson State
- South Carolina State

Semifinals
1	North Carolina	99
Old Dominion	82
Louisville	76
BYU	86

Championship
1	North Carolina	73
BYU	63
3rd Place Game
Louisville	64
Old Dominion	53

=== 2006 participants and bracket ===
- Ball State
- Florida
- Kansas
- WKU
- Chattanooga
- Prairie View A&M
- Tennessee State
- Towson

Semifinals
1	Florida	101
WKU	68
10	Kansas	64
Ball State	46

Championship
1	Florida	80
10	Kansas	82
3rd Place Game
WKU	76
Ball State	66

=== 2005 participants and bracket ===
- Boston College
- Drake
- Oklahoma State
- TCU
- Buffalo
- Detroit
- Jackson State
- Shawnee State

Semifinals
TCU	58
Oklahoma State	66
Boston College	87
Drake	84

Championship
Oklahoma State	68
Boston College	76
3rd Place Game
Drake	86
TCU	79

=== 2004 participants and bracket ===
- Arizona State
- Southern Illinois
- Vanderbilt
- UTEP
- Cal State Northridge
- Delaware State
- Jackson State
- Tennessee State

Semifinals
UTEP	66
Arizona State	65
Vanderbilt	53
Southern Illinois	67

Championship
UTEP	62
Southern Illinois	68
3rd Place Game
Arizona State	87
Vanderbilt	68

=== 2003 participants and bracket ===
- Bradley
- Miami (FL)
- Lubbock Christian
- Louisiana–Monroe
- Northeastern
- Rhode Island

Championship Game
Miami (FL)	82
Bradley	83
