= Jerome Hill (basketball) =

American basketball player

Personal information
- Born: September 18, 1992 (age 34) Adel, Georgia
- Listed height: 6 ft 5 in (1.96 m)
- Listed weight: 225 lb (102 kg)

Career information
- High school: Cook (Adel, Georgia)
- College: Gardner–Webb (2012–2015)
- NBA draft: 2015: undrafted
- Playing career: 2015–present
- Position: Shooting guard / small forward

Career history
- 2015–2016: Tindastóll
- 2016: Keflavík
- 2016–2017: Huracan Trelew
- 2017: Atlético Echagüe
- 2017–2019: Puente Alto
- 2019: Hyeres-Toulon

Career highlights
- First-team All-Big South (2015); Second-team All-Big South (2014)

Jerome Hill is an American basketball player who played college basketball for the Gardner–Webb Runnin' Bulldogs. He was named to multiple all-conference teams in his time attending Gardner–Webb University.

== Iceland ==
In 2015, Hill signed with Úrvalsdeild club Tindastóll. After a disappointing performance, he was released by the club on January 31, 2016. A few days later, he signed with Keflavík. In his first game with Keflavík, Hill was two assists shy of a triple double and ended with 22 points, 11 rebounds and 8 assists. In the playoffs, Hill and Keflavík faced his old team in the quarter-finals. After a heated series, Keflavík lost the series 1–3.

In 2017, Hill signed with Puente Alto of the Chilean LNB and went on to average 19.8 points, 9.7 rebounds and 4.2 assists in 33 games during the 2017–2018 season. He returned to the team the following season.
