= Vines Center =

Multi-purpose arena in Lynchburg, Virginia

The Vines Convocation Center
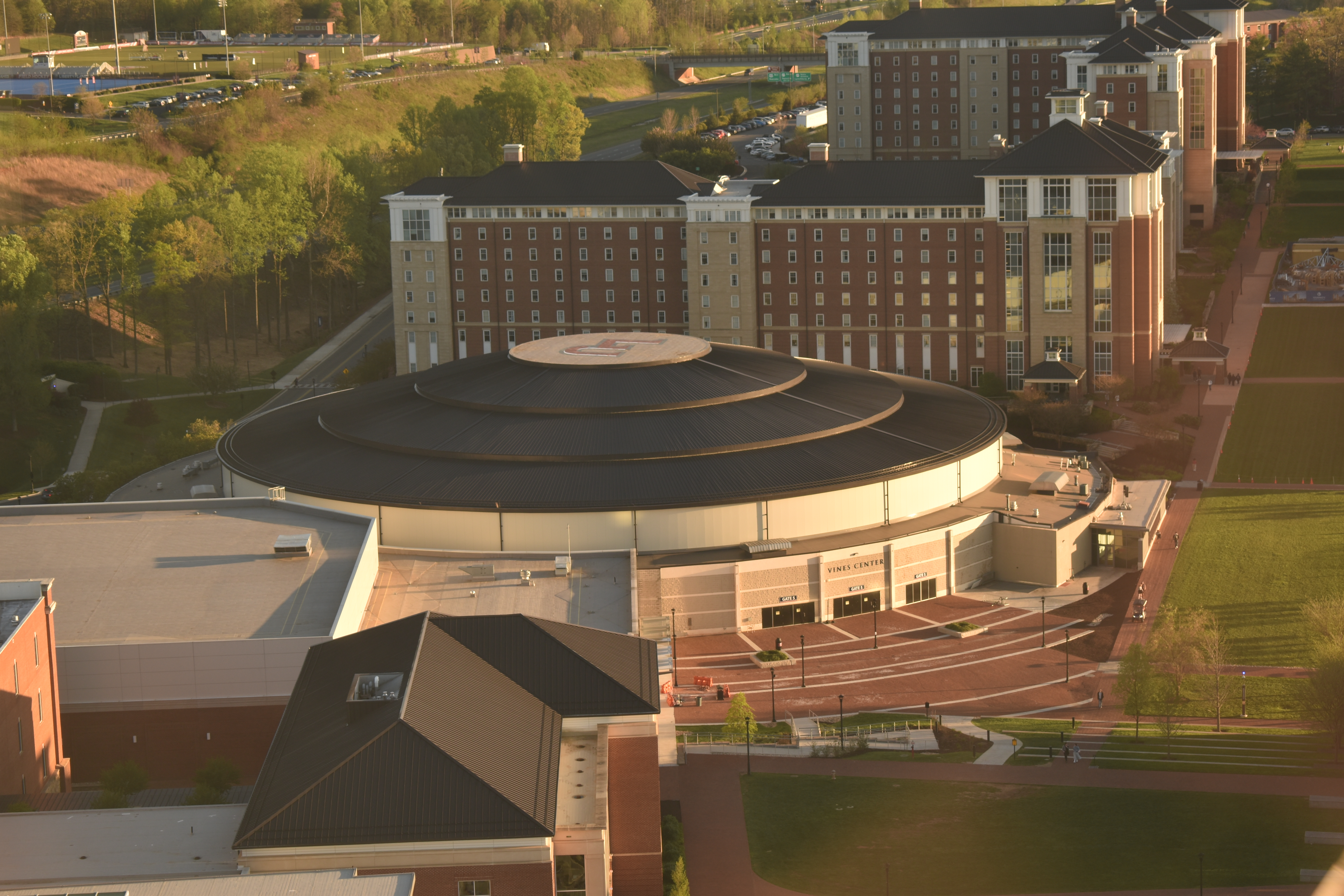
- The Vines Center, seen in 2024
- Interactive map of The Vines Convocation Center
- Location: 1971 University Boulevard; Lynchburg, Virginia 24502
- Coordinates: 37.349068°N 79.180998°W
- Owner: Liberty University
- Operator: Liberty University
- Capacity: 9,547 (Basketball); 10,000+ (Special Events)
- Surface: Hardwood

Construction
- Groundbreaking: 1988
- Opened: October 22, 1990
- Cost: $7.5 million ($18.5 million in 2025 dollars)
- Architects: Haken/Corley and Associates
- General contractors: McDevitt & Street

Tenants
- Liberty Flames & Lady Flames basketball (1990–2020, plus later special events)

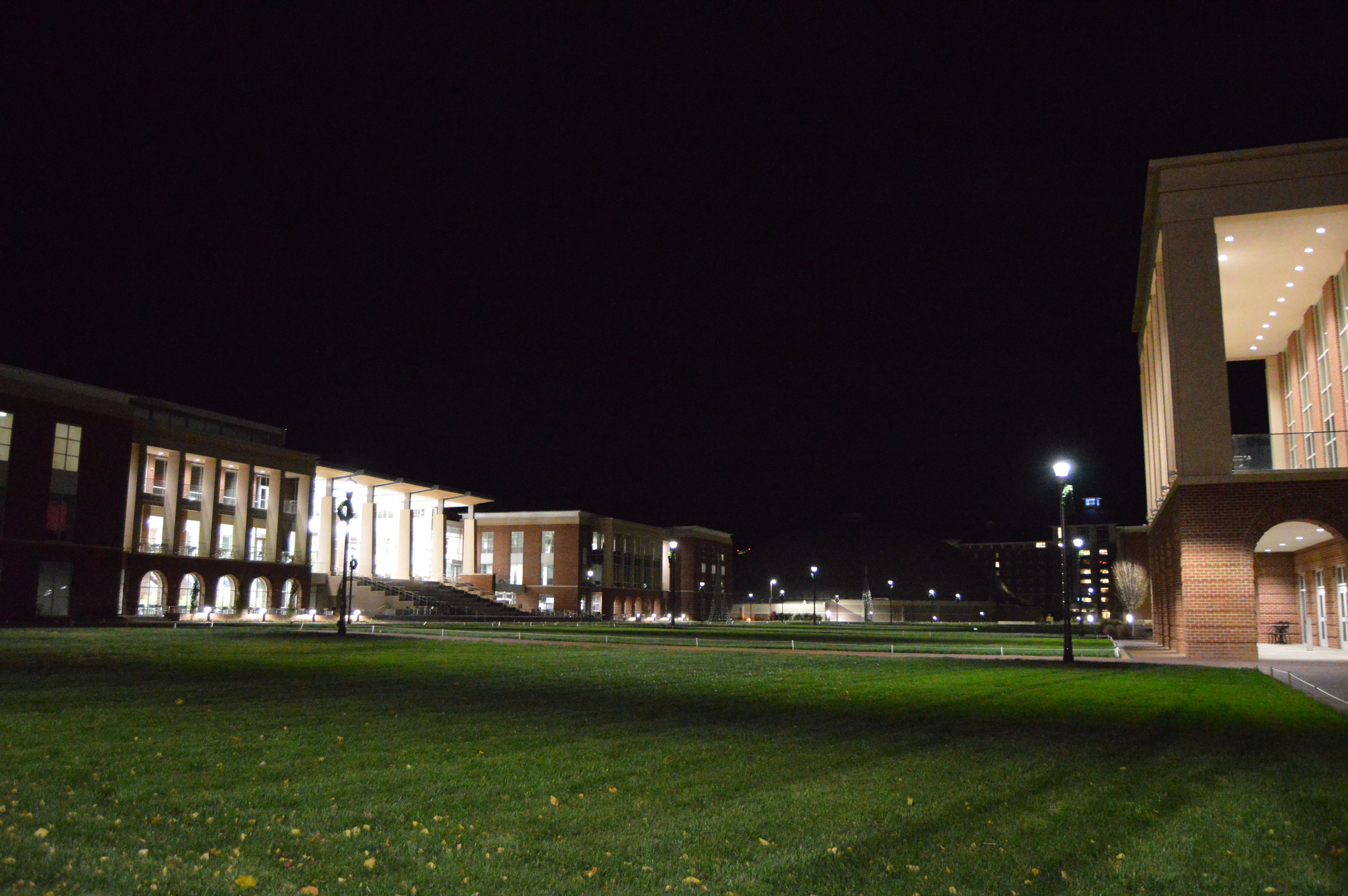
Liberty Campus at night with the Vines Center pictured in the background

The Vines Convocation Center, also known as simply The Vines Center, is a 9,547-seat multi-purpose arena in Lynchburg, Virginia. It was built in 1990 and was home to the Liberty University Flames (men's) and Lady Flames (women's) basketball teams from its opening until the adjacent Liberty Arena opened in 2020. The Vines Center features three practice courts (1.5 each for men's and women's basketball). It hosted the Big South Conference men's basketball tournament from 1995 to 1998, and also all rounds of the tourney except for the first round in 2003 and 2004. In the fall of 2008 the Vines Center underwent a major renovation of all seating.

In addition to sporting events the Vines Center hosts Liberty's Convocations (mandatory meetings which are held on Wednesdays and Fridays of each week at 10:30 AM; attendance at Convocation is mandatory for all students, except for Convocation selects, which are held on Mondays at a different venue. (Note: Liberty specifically states that Convocation is not a chapel service (notwithstanding the mandatory attendance), as it often invites guest speakers with viewpoints that differ greatly from those of Liberty.)) and commencement exercises.

The Vines Center was the largest basketball arena in the Big South Conference when Liberty was a member (1991–2018), and before the opening of Liberty Arena was the largest arena to serve as a regular basketball home in Liberty's former league, the ASUN Conference. (Note: The opening of Liberty Arena also coincided with the arrival of Bellarmine University in the ASUN Conference. While Bellarmine's on-campus arena is considerably smaller than Liberty Arena, that school is now playing its basketball games in the 18,000-seat Freedom Hall.) Liberty now competes in Conference USA for men's and women's basketball.

In 2020, the Vines Center was replaced as the main home to Flames and Lady Flames basketball and Lady Flames volleyball by the adjacent Liberty Arena. Liberty Arena hosts games and events where the attendance is not expected to exceed 4,000, while the Vines Center will continue to host high-attendance games and events.

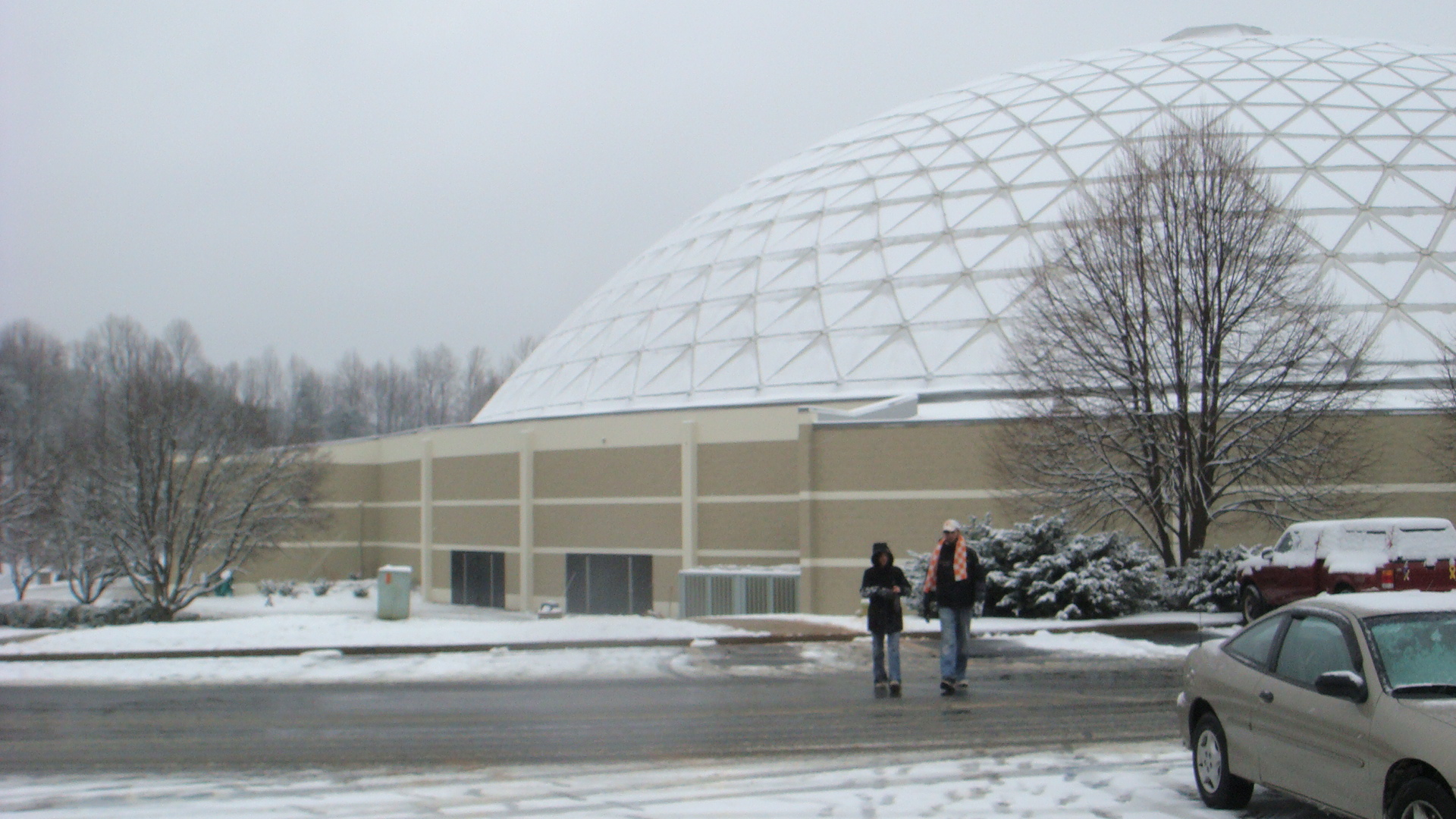
The Vines Center pictured in 2008

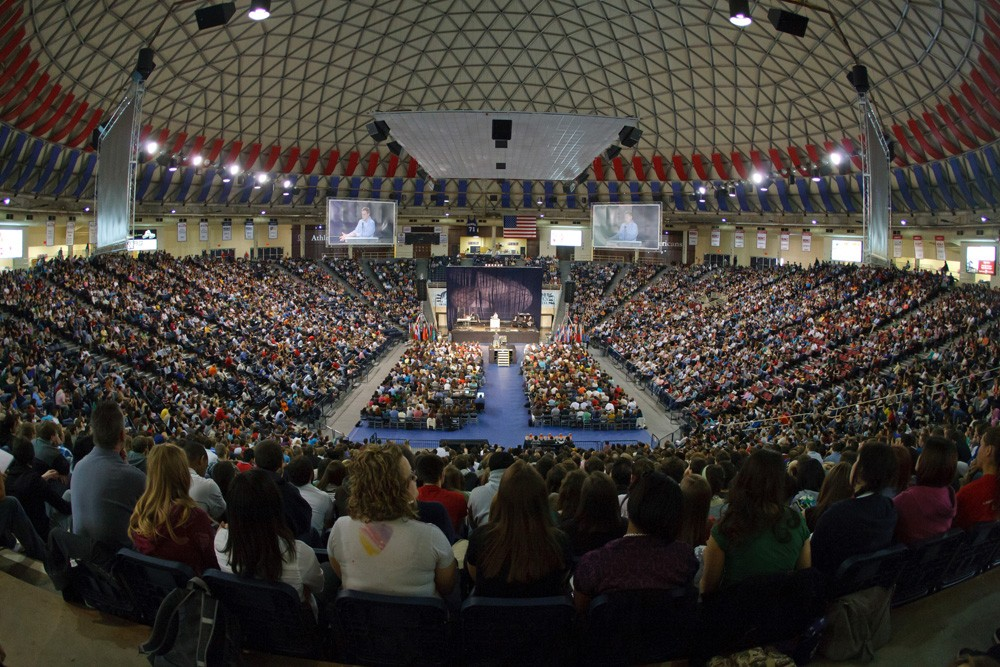
The Vines Center during a Convocation (prior to renovations and upgrades such as the center-hung scoreboard)

Senator Bernie Sanders speaking to students at Convocation during the 2016 United States Presidential Election

== See also ==
- List of NCAA Division I basketball arenas
