= 2012–13 Arizona Wildcats men's basketball team =

2012–13 Arizona Wildcats men's basketball

Diamond Head Classic champions

NCAA tournament, Sweet Sixteen
- Conference: Pac-12 Conference

Ranking
- Coaches: No. 14
- AP: No. 21
- Record: 27–8 (12–6 Pac-12)
- Head coach: Sean Miller (4th season)
- Assistant coaches: James Whitford; Joe Pasternack; Emanuel Richardson
- Home arena: McKale Center

2012–13 Pac-12 Conference men's basketball standings
	Conf.				Overall
Team	W		L	PCT	W		L	PCT
No. 24 UCLA	13	–	5	.722	25	–	10	.714
No. 25 Oregon †	12	–	6	.667	28	–	9	.757
No. 21 Arizona	12	–	6	.667	27	–	8	.771
California	12	–	6	.667	21	–	12	.636
Colorado	10	–	8	.556	21	–	12	.636
Arizona State	9	–	9	.500	22	–	13	.629
Stanford	9	–	9	.500	19	–	15	.559
Washington	9	–	9	.500	18	–	16	.529
USC	9	–	9	.500	14	–	18	.438
Utah	5	–	13	.278	15	–	18	.455
Oregon State	4	–	14	.222	14	–	18	.438
Washington State	4	–	14	.222	13	–	19	.406
† Conference tournament winner As of March 23, 2013; Rankings from AP Poll

The 2012–13 Arizona Wildcats men's basketball team represented the University of Arizona during the 2012–13 NCAA Division I men's basketball season. They were led by fourth-year head coach Sean Miller and played their home games at McKale Center in Tucson, Arizona as members of the Pac-12 Conference.

Seeded 6th in the West Region of the 2013 NCAA tournament, the team defeated (11) Belmont and (14) Harvard by a combined score of 40 points before losing 73–70 to (2) Ohio State in the Sweet Sixteen.

After starting the season undefeated in non-conference play, the team went 12–6 in conference and fell to UCLA in the Pac-12 tournament semifinals. The team's mid-season record of 14–0 was the second best start in program history since the 1931–32 team opened the season 16–0.

Arizona entered the season ranked 11th in the Coaches and 12th in the AP preseason polls, climbed to 3rd in both after going undefeated into January, and then fell to 20th (Coaches) and 21st (AP) just prior to the start of the NCAA tournament.

Before the season began Sean Miller and his staff recruited the nation's 3rd-ranked class of 2012 and brought in three well-regarded transfers, among them starting point guard Mark Lyons, who led the team in scoring with 15.6 points-per-game, including 24.3 points-per-game in NCAA tournament play.

== Offseason ==
=== Recruiting class ===
College recruiting
Name	Hometown	School	Height	Weight	Commit date
Kaleb Tarczewski; C	Claremont, NH	St. Mark's School	7 ft 0 in (2.13 m)	230 lb (100 kg)	Aug 22, 2011
Kaleb Tarczewski; C	Recruit ratings: Rivals: 247Sports: ESPN: (97)				
Grant Jerrett; PF	La Verne, CA	La Verne Lutheran H.S.	6 ft 10 in (2.08 m)	220 lb (100 kg)	Nov 27, 2010
Grant Jerrett; PF	Recruit ratings: Rivals: 247Sports: ESPN: (97)				
Brandon Ashley; PF	Oakland, CA	Findlay College Prep	6 ft 8 in (2.03 m)	230 lb (100 kg)	Aug 29, 2011
Brandon Ashley; PF	Recruit ratings: Rivals: 247Sports: ESPN: (97)				
Gabe York; SG	Orange, CA	Orange Lutheran H.S.	6 ft 1 in (1.85 m)	170 lb (77 kg)	Jul 10, 2011
Gabe York; SG	Recruit ratings: Scout: Rivals: ESPN: (93)				
Jacob Hazzard; PG	Los Angeles, CA	Loyola H.S.	5 ft 11 in (1.80 m)	170 lb (77 kg)	Apr 15, 2012
Jacob Hazzard; PG	Recruit ratings: Scout: Rivals: (78)				
Overall recruit ranking: Scout: #3 Rivals: #3 ESPN: #3
Note: In many cases, Scout, Rivals, 247Sports, On3, and ESPN may conflict in their listings of height and weight.; In these cases, the average was taken. ESPN grades are on a 100-point scale.; Sources: "2012 Arizona Basketball Commits". Scout.; "ESPN". ESPN.; "Scout.com Team Recruiting Rankings". Scout.; "2012 Team Ranking". Rivals.

=== Incoming transfers ===
Name	Number	Pos.	Height	Weight	Year	Hometown	Notes
Mark Lyons	2	PG	6'1"	188	Senior	Schenectady, New York	Lyons left Xavier to play his senior year at Arizona. He was eligible to play immediately under the NCAA's graduate transfer rule.
T. J. McConnell	4	PG	6'1"	180	Junior	Pittsburgh, Pennsylvania	McConnell elected to transfer after his sophomore year at Duquesne and redshirted the 2012–13 season under NCAA transfer rules.
Matt Korcheck	31	PF	6'9"	220	Junior	Tucson, Arizona	A junior college transfer from Cochise College, Korcheck elected to redshirt the season and had two years eligibility starting in 2013–14.

=== Departures ===
Name	Number	Pos.	Height	Weight	Year	Hometown	Notes
Alex Jacobson	50	C	7'0"	253	Senior	Santa Ana, California	Graduated
Jesse Perry	33	SF	6'7"	217	Senior	St. Louis, Missouri	Graduated
Brendon Lavender	24	SG	6'5"	212	Senior	Mesa, Arizona	Graduated
Kyle Fogg	21	SG	6'3"	188	Senior	Brea, California	Graduated
Dondre Wise	0	PG	6'1"	220	Senior	Houston, Texas	Graduated
Kyryl Natyazhko	14	C	6'11"	275	Junior	Dnipropetrovsk, Ukraine	Natyazhko announced his intention to turn professional in April, 2012. He played for Ukrainian club Azovmash Mariupol in 2012–2013.
Sidiki Johnson	1	PF	6'8"	235	Freshman	Brooklyn, New York	Suspended indefinitely for violation of team rules, Johnson transferred to Providence in December 2011.
Josiah Turner	11	PG	6'3"	192	Freshman	Sacramento, California	Suspended indefinitely for violation of team rules in March 2012, Turner transferred to SMU but withdrew to pursue a professional career.

== Roster ==
2012–13 Arizona Wildcats men's basketball team
Players
Coaches

Pos.	#	Name	Height	Weight	Year	Previous school	Hometown
G	1	Gabe York	6 ft 2 in (1.88 m)	185 lb (84 kg)	Fr	Orange Lutheran H.S.	Orange, California
G	2	Mark Lyons	6 ft 1 in (1.85 m)	200 lb (91 kg)	Sr	Brewster Academy/Xavier	Schenectady, New York
G/F	3	Kevin Parrom	6 ft 6 in (1.98 m)	220 lb (100 kg)	Sr	South Kent School	Bronx, New York
G	4	T. J. McConnell (redshirt)	6 ft 1 in (1.85 m)	190 lb (86 kg)	Jr	Chartiers Valley H.S./Duquesne	Pittsburgh, Pennsylvania
G	13	Nick Johnson	6 ft 3 in (1.91 m)	200 lb (91 kg)	So	Findlay Prep	Gilbert, Arizona
G	20	Jordin Mayes	6 ft 3 in (1.91 m)	200 lb (91 kg)	Jr	Westchester H.S.	Los Angeles, California
F	21	Brandon Ashley	6 ft 8 in (2.03 m)	235 lb (107 kg)	Fr	Findlay Prep	Oakland, California
F	30	Angelo Chol	6 ft 9 in (2.06 m)	225 lb (102 kg)	So	Hoover H.S.	Khartoum, Sudan
F	31	Matt Korcheck (redshirt)	6 ft 10 in (2.08 m)	225 lb (102 kg)	Jr	Sabino H.S./Cochise College	Tucson, Arizona
F/C	33	Grant Jerrett	6 ft 10 in (2.08 m)	235 lb (107 kg)	Fr	Lutheran H.S.	La Verne, California
C	35	Kaleb Tarczewski	7 ft 0 in (2.13 m)	255 lb (116 kg)	Fr	St. Mark's School	Claremont, New Hampshire
F	44	Solomon Hill	6 ft 7 in (2.01 m)	220 lb (100 kg)	Sr	Fairfax H.S.	Los Angeles, California
G	50	Jacob Hazzard (W)	5 ft 11 in (1.8 m)	165 lb (75 kg)	Fr	Loyola H.S.	Los Angeles, California
G	51	Quinton Crawford (W)	6 ft 2 in (1.88 m)	200 lb (91 kg)	RS Sr	Old Bridge H.S./Middlesex County	Old Bridge, New Jersey
F	52	Max Wiepking (W)	6 ft 6 in (1.98 m)	220 lb (100 kg)	Sr	Kent Denver School	Englewood, Colorado
F	55	Drew Mellon (W)	6 ft 6 in (1.98 m)	210 lb (95 kg)	So	Mater Dei H.S.	Santa Ana, California

Head coach

- Sean Miller (Pittsburgh)

Assistant coach(es)

- James Whitford (Wisconsin)
- Joe Pasternack (Indiana)
- Emanuel Richardson (Pitt–Johnstown)

Legend

- (C) Team captain
- (S) Suspended
- (I) Ineligible
- (W) Walk-on
- Injured
- Current redshirt

Roster

=== Depth chart ===
Pos.	Starting 5	Bench 1	Bench 2	Bench 3
C	Kaleb Tarczewski	Grant Jerrett
PF	Brandon Ashley	Angelo Chol		Matt Korcheck
SF	Solomon Hill	Kevin Parrom	Max Wiepking	Drew Mellon
SG	Nick Johnson	Gabe York	Quinton Crawford
PG	Mark Lyons	Jordin Mayes	Jacob Hazzard	TJ McConnell

== Preseason ==
=== Summer Exhibition Tour ===
Practices began earlier than otherwise allowed by the NCAA in preparation for a six-day foreign tour to the Bahamas in August. (NCAA rules allow teams to conduct 10 practices in preparation for a foreign tour.) Although NCAA rules allow for foreign tours once every four years, the Bahamas tour was Arizona's first since 2006. It was the seventh in program history. The team won its games 136–66 and 99–57.

=== Red-Blue Game ===
Arizona's annual pre-season Red-Blue scrimmage took place at McKale Center on October 21, selling out for the second-straight season. A half-time ceremony celebrated the 25-year anniversary of the 1987-88 basketball team, the first in program history to reach the Final Four. The team's 35 victories remain the most in school history. Members of the team present included Tucson-native Sean Elliott, Arizona's all-time leading scorer, with 2,555 career points; Steve Kerr, whose 57.8% three-point field-goal percentage in the 1987–88 season is the best in NCAA history (with a minimum of 100 shots made); and Anthony Cook, who recorded a program-best 278 career blocked-shots.

== Schedule ==
Date time, TV	Rank^{#}	Opponent^{#}	Result	Record	Site (attendance) city, state
Exhibition
10/31/2012*; 6:30 pm	No. 12	Humboldt State	W 108–67	–	McKale Center (12,431); Tucson, AZ
11/06/2012*; 6:30 pm	No. 12	Chico State	W 98–60	–	McKale Center (12,268); Tucson, AZ
Non-conference regular season
11/11/2012*; 4:00 pm, P12N	No. 12	Charleston Southern	W 82–73	1–0	McKale Center (14,503); Tucson, AZ
11/15/2012*; 8:00 pm, FSN	No. 12	UTEP	W 71–52	2–0	McKale Center (13,576); Tucson, AZ
11/19/2012*; 7:00 pm, P12N	No. 10	Long Beach State	W 94–72	3–0	McKale Center (13,382); Tucson, AZ
11/28/2012*; 8:00 pm, P12N	No. 9	Northern Arizona	W 93–50	4–0	McKale Center (13,003); Tucson, AZ
12/01/2012*; 6:00 pm, ESPNU	No. 9	at Texas Tech	W 85–57	5–0	United Spirit Arena (10,782); Lubbock, TX
12/04/2012*; 7:30 pm, P12N	No. 8	Southern Miss	W 63–55	6–0	McKale Center (13,419); Tucson, AZ
12/08/2012*; 6:00 pm, ESPN2	No. 8	at Clemson	W 66–54	7–0	Littlejohn Coliseum (8,509); Clemson, SC
12/15/2012*; 8:00 pm, ESPN	No. 8	No. 5 Florida	W 65–64	8–0	McKale Center (14,545); Tucson, AZ
12/18/2012*; 7:00 pm, P12N	No. 4	Oral Roberts	W 89–64	9–0	McKale Center (13,067); Tucson, AZ
12/22/2012*; 8:30 pm, ESPNU	No. 4	vs. East Tennessee State; Diamond Head Classic quarterfinals	W 73–53	10–0	Stan Sheriff Center (8,120); Honolulu, HI
12/23/2012*; 9:30 pm, ESPN2	No. 4	vs. Miami (FL); Diamond Head Classic semifinals	W 69–50	11–0	Stan Sheriff Center (6,564); Honolulu, HI
12/25/2012*; 8:15 pm, ESPN2	No. 3	vs. No. 17 San Diego State; Diamond Head Classic championship	W 68–67	12–0	Stan Sheriff Center (6,514); Honolulu, HI
Pac-12 regular season
01/03/2013; 6:00 pm, ESPNU	No. 3	Colorado	W 92–83 ^{OT}	13–0 (1–0)	McKale Center (14,545); Tucson, AZ
01/05/2013; 3:00 pm, P12N	No. 3	Utah	W 60–57	14–0 (2–0)	McKale Center (14,545); Tucson, AZ
01/10/2013; 7:00 pm, ESPN2	No. 4	at Oregon	L 66–70	14–1 (2–1)	Matthew Knight Arena (9,544); Eugene, OR
01/12/2013; 6:00 pm, ESPNU	No. 4	at Oregon State	W 80–70	15–1 (3–1)	Gill Coliseum (7,224); Corvallis, OR
01/19/2013; 12:30 pm, FSN	No. 7	at Arizona State	W 71–54	16–1 (4–1)	Wells Fargo Arena (10,900); Tempe, AZ
01/24/2013; 7:00 pm, ESPN2	No. 6	UCLA	L 73–84	16–2 (4–2)	McKale Center (14,617); Tucson, AZ
01/26/2013; 5:00 pm, ESPNU	No. 6	USC	W 74–50	17–2 (5–2)	McKale Center (14,578); Tucson, AZ
01/31/2013; 7:00 pm, ESPN	No. 8	at Washington	W 57–53	18–2 (6–2)	Alaska Airlines Arena (8,535); Seattle, WA
02/02/2013; 8:00 pm, P12N	No. 8	at Washington State	W 79–65	19–2 (7–2)	Beasley Coliseum (6,002); Pullman, WA
02/06/2013; 7:00 pm, ESPNews	No. 7	Stanford	W 73–66	20–2 (8–2)	McKale Center (14,545); Tucson, AZ
02/10/2013; 5:00 pm, P12N	No. 7	California	L 69–77	20–3 (8–3)	McKale Center (14,545); Tucson, AZ
02/14/2013; 8:00 pm, P12N	No. 9	at Colorado	L 58–71	20–4 (8–4)	Coors Events Center (11,120); Boulder, CO
02/17/2013; 1:00 pm, P12N	No. 9	at Utah	W 68–64	21–4 (9–4)	Huntsman Center (11,712); Salt Lake City, UT
02/20/2013; 9:00 pm, ESPN2	No. 12	Washington	W 70–52	22–4 (10–4)	McKale Center (14,545); Tucson, AZ
02/23/2013; 1:00 pm, FSN	No. 12	Washington State	W 73–56	23–4 (11–4)	McKale Center (14,545); Tucson, AZ
02/27/2013; 7:30 pm, P12N	No. 11	at USC	L 78–89	23–5 (11–5)	Galen Center (4,207); Los Angeles, CA
03/02/2013; 7:00 pm, ESPN	No. 11	at UCLA; ESPN College GameDay	L 69–74	23–6 (11–6)	Pauley Pavilion (13,727); Los Angeles, CA
03/09/2013; 2:30 pm, FSN	No. 18	Arizona State	W 73–58	24–6 (12–6)	McKale Center (14,545); Tucson, AZ
Pac-12 Tournament
03/14/2013; 2:30 pm, P12N	(4) No. 18	vs. (5) Colorado; Quarterfinals	W 79–69	25–6	MGM Grand Garden Arena (12,915); Paradise, NV
03/15/2013; 7:00 pm, P12N	(4) No. 18	vs. (1) No. 21 UCLA; Semifinals	L 64–66	25–7	MGM Grand Garden Arena (13,151); Paradise, NV
NCAA tournament
03/21/2013*; 5:30 pm, TNT	(6 W) No. 21	vs. (11 W) Belmont; First Round	W 81–64	26–7	EnergySolutions Arena (14,345); Salt Lake City, UT
03/23/2013*; 3:10 pm, TNT	(6 W) No. 21	vs. (14 W) Harvard; Second Round	W 74–51	27–7	EnergySolutions Arena (16,060); Salt Lake City, UT
03/28/2013*; 4:47 pm, TBS	(6 W) No. 21	vs. (2 W) No. 7 Ohio State; Sweet Sixteen	L 70–73	27–8	Staples Center (18,232); Los Angeles, CA
*Non-conference game. ^{#}Rankings from AP Poll. (#) Tournament seedings in parentheses. All times are in Mountain Standard Time. (#) during NCAA Tournament is Seed with Region W=West.

== Awards ==
Solomon Hill

- 2012 Diamond Head Classic MVP, All-Tournament Team
- Pac-12 All-Conference First Team
- USBWA All-District IX Team
- NABC All-District 20 First Team

Nick Johnson

- Honorable mention Pac-12 All-Defensive Team

Mark Lyons

- 2012 Diamond Head Classic All-Tournament Team
- Pac-12 Player of the Week – January 21, 2013
- Pac-12 All-Conference First Team
- USBWA All-District IX Team
- NABC All-District 20 First Team

Kaleb Tarczewski

- Honorable mention Pac-12 All-Freshmen Team

== Rankings ==
Ranking movement Legend: ¦¦ Increase in ranking. ¦¦ Decrease in ranking. ¦¦ Not ranked the previous week.
Poll	Pre	Wk 2	Wk 3	Wk 4	Wk 5	Wk 6	Wk 7	Wk 8	Wk 9	Wk 10	Wk 11	Wk 12	Wk 13	Wk 14	Wk 15	Wk 16	Wk 17	Wk 18	Wk 19	Post	Final
AP	12	12	10	9	8	8	4	3	3	4	7	6	8	7	9	12	11	18	18	21	-
Coaches	11	12	10	9	8	8	5	3	3	3	7	6	8	7	9	12	11	18	18	20	14
