= 2013 Pac-12 Conference men's basketball tournament =

- 2013 tournament logo
- Classification: Division I
- Season: 2012–13
- Site: MGM Grand Garden Arena; Paradise, Nevada
- Champions: Oregon (3rd title)
- Winning coach: Dana Altman (1st title)
- Attendance: 63,750 (total); 11,101 (championship game)
- Television: Pac-12 Network, ESPN, ESPNU

2012–13 Pac-12 Conference men's basketball standings
	Conf.				Overall
Team	W		L	PCT	W		L	PCT
No. 24 UCLA	13	–	5	.722	25	–	10	.714
No. 25 Oregon †	12	–	6	.667	28	–	9	.757
No. 21 Arizona	12	–	6	.667	27	–	8	.771
California	12	–	6	.667	21	–	12	.636
Colorado	10	–	8	.556	21	–	12	.636
Arizona State	9	–	9	.500	22	–	13	.629
Stanford	9	–	9	.500	19	–	15	.559
Washington	9	–	9	.500	18	–	16	.529
USC	9	–	9	.500	14	–	18	.438
Utah	5	–	13	.278	15	–	18	.455
Oregon State	4	–	14	.222	14	–	18	.438
Washington State	4	–	14	.222	13	–	19	.406
† Conference tournament winner As of March 23, 2013; Rankings from AP Poll

The 2013 Pacific Life Pac-12 Conference men's basketball tournament was played March 13–16 at the MGM Grand Garden Arena in Paradise, Nevada. The UCLA Bruins, regular season champions, were named as the No. 1 seed team. Oregon won the tournament and received an automatic bid to the 2013 NCAA tournament. Oregon defeated UCLA for the tournament championship.

== Seeds ==
Teams were seeded by conference record, with ties broken by record between the tied teams followed by record against the regular-season champion, if necessary.

Seed	School	Conf (Overall)	Tiebreaker
#1	#21 UCLA	13-5 (23–8)	
#2	California	12-6 (20–10)	3-0 vs OREG, ARIZ
#3	Oregon	12-6 (23–8)	1-2 vs ARIZ, CAL
#4	#18 Arizona	12-6 (24–6)	0-2 vs OREG, CAL
#5	Colorado	10-8 (20–10)	
#6	Washington	9-9 (17–14)	4-1 vs USC, STAN, ASU
#7	USC	9-9 (14–17)	4-2 vs WASH, ASU, STAN
#8	Stanford	9-9 (18–13)	1-3 vs ASU, USC, WASH
#9	Arizona State	9-9 (20–11)	1-4 vs STAN, USC, WASH
#10	Utah	5-13 (13–17)	
#11	Washington State	4-14 (13–18)	1-1 vs OSU, 1-1 vs UCLA
#12	Oregon State	4-14 (14–17)	1-1 vs WSU, 0-1 vs UCLA

== Schedule ==
The top four seeds received a first-round bye.

Session	Game	Time*	Matchup^{#}	Final Score	Television	Attendance
First Round – Wednesday, March 13
1	1	12:00 PM	#8 Stanford vs. #9 Arizona State	88–89^{OT}	Pac-12 Network	7,451
1	2	2:30 PM	#5 Colorado vs. #12 Oregon State	74–68	Pac-12 Network	7,451
2	3	6:00 PM	#7 USC vs. #10 Utah	66–69	Pac-12 Network	8,566
2	4	8:30 PM	#6 Washington vs. #11 Washington State	64–62	Pac-12 Network	8,566
Quarterfinals – Thursday, March 14
3	5	12:00 PM	#1 UCLA vs. #9 Arizona State	80–75	Pac-12 Network	12,915
3	6	2:30 PM	#4 Arizona vs. #5 Colorado	79–69	Pac-12 Network	12,915
4	7	6:00 PM	#2 California vs. #10 Utah	69–79^{OT}	Pac-12 Network	10,566
4	8	8:30 PM	#3 Oregon vs. #6 Washington	80–77^{OT}	ESPNU	10,566
Semifinals – Friday, March 15
5	9	6:00 PM	#1 UCLA vs. #4 Arizona	66–64	Pac-12 Network	13,151
5	10	8:30 PM	#10 Utah vs. #3 Oregon	45–64	ESPN	13,151
Championship Game – Saturday, March 16
6	11	8:10 PM	#1 UCLA vs. #3 Oregon	69–78	ESPN	11,101
*Game Times in PT. #-Rankings denote tournament seed

== Bracket ==
First round March 13, 2013
8	Stanford	88
9	Arizona State	89^{OT}
5	Colorado	74
12	Oregon State	68
7	USC	66
10	Utah	69
6	Washington	64
11	Washington State	62

Quarterfinals; March 14, 2013
1	#21 UCLA	80
9	Arizona State	75
4	#18 Arizona	79
5	Colorado	69
2	California	69
10	Utah	79^{OT}
3	Oregon	80^{OT}
6	Washington	77

Semifinals; March 15, 2013
1	#21 UCLA	66
4	#18 Arizona	64
10	Utah	45
3	Oregon	64

Championship Game; March 16, 2013
1	#21 UCLA	69
3	Oregon	78

== Game summaries ==
Pac-12 Network

Mar 13
12:00 pm

Recap

Arizona State Sun Devils 89, Stanford Cardinal 88 (OT)
Scoring by half: 35–33, 44–46 Overtime: 10–9
Pts: Jahii Carson 34; Rebs: Carrick Felix 12; Asts: 3 tied with 4	Pts: Aaron Bright 27; Rebs: Josh Huestis 9 Asts: Aaron Bright 5

MGM Grand Garden Arena
Paradise, NV
Attendance: 7,451
Referees: Gregory Nixon, Kevin Brill, Daryl Gelinas

Pac-12 Network

Mar 13
2:30 pm

Recap

Oregon State Beavers 68, Colorado Buffaloes 74
Scoring by half: 26–32, 42–42
Pts: Roberto Nelson 20; Rebs: Eric Moreland 13; Asts: 2 tied with 3	Pts: Spencer Dinwiddie 20; Rebs: Josh Scott 10; Asts: 2 tied with 4

MGM Grand Garden Arena
Paradise, NV
Attendance: 7,451
Referees: Mike Reed, Jeff Wooten, Tommy Nunez

Pac-12 Network

Mar 13
6:00 pm

Recap

Utah Utes 69, USC Trojans 66
Scoring by half: 35–28, 34–38
Pts: Jarred DuBois 22; Rebs: Jordan Loveridge 9 Asts: Jarred DuBois 4	Pts: Omar Oraby 18; Rebs: Omar Oraby 10; Asts: Jio Fontan 7

MGM Grand Garden Arena
Paradise, NV
Attendance: 8,566
Referees: Chris Rastatter, Mike Scyphers, Justin Van Duyne

Pac-12 Network

Mar 13
8:30 pm

Recap

Washington State Cougars 62, Washington Huskies 64
Scoring by half: 25–36, 37–28
Pts: Brock Motum 28; Rebs: Mike Ladd 6 Asts: Dexter Kernich-Drew 4	Pts: Scott Suggs 19; Rebs: Aziz N'Diaye 8 Asts: Abdul Gaddy 11

MGM Grand Garden Arena
Paradise, NV
Attendance: 8,566
Referees: Michael Irving, Tony Padilla, Kurt Walker

Pac-12 Network

Mar 14
12:00 pm

Recap

Arizona State Sun Devils 75, #21 UCLA Bruins 80
Scoring by half: 41–33, 34–47
Pts: Jordan Bachynski 22; Rebs: Jonathan Gilling 6 Asts: Jahii Carson 7	Pts: Larry Drew II 20; Rebs: Shabazz Muhammad 9 Asts: 2 tied with 4

MGM Grand Garden Arena
Paradise, NV
Attendance: 12,915
Referees: Randy McCall, Michael Eggers, Tommy Nunez

Pac-12 Network

Mar 14
2:30 pm

Recap

Colorado Buffaloes 69, #18 Arizona Wildcats 79
Scoring by half: 28–39, 41–40
Pts: Spencer Dinwiddie 18; Rebs: Andre Roberson 11; Asts: 2 tied with 2	Pts: Nick Johnson 18; Rebs: Solomon Hill 7 Asts: Solomon Hill 4

MGM Grand Garden Arena
Paradise, NV
Attendance: 12,915
Referees: Tony Padilla, Michael Greenstein, Brett Nansel

Pac-12 Network

Mar 14
6:00 pm

Recap

Utah Utes 79, California Golden Bears 69 (OT)
Scoring by half: 32–33, 27–26 Overtime: 20–10
Pts: Jarred DuBois 21; Rebs: Jordan Loveridge 8 Asts: Jordan Loveridge 5	Pts: Justin Cobbs 26; Rebs: Richard Solomon 11; Asts: Justin Cobbs 5

MGM Grand Garden Arena
Paradise, NV
Attendance: 10,566
Referees: Verne Harris, David Hall, Deron White

ESPNU

Mar 14
8:30 pm

Recap

Washington Huskies 77, Oregon Ducks 80 (OT)
Scoring by half: 34–39, 30–25 Overtime: 13–16
Pts: C.J. Wilcox 19; Rebs: Aziz N'Diaye 9 Asts: Abdul Gaddy 5	Pts: Tony Woods 19; Rebs: Arsalan Kazemi 9 Asts: Johnathan Loyd 4

MGM Grand Garden Arena
Paradise, NV
Attendance: 10,566
Referees: Chris Rastatter, Gregory Nixon, Deldre Carr

Pac-12 Network

Mar 15
6:00 pm

Recap

#18 Arizona Wildcats 64, #21 UCLA Bruins 66
Scoring by half: 30–26, 34–40
Pts: Brandon Ashley 15; Rebs: Kaleb Tarczewski 13; Asts: 2 tied with 5	Pts: Jordan Adams 24; Rebs: Shabazz Muhammad 6 Asts: Larry Drew II 4

MGM Grand Garden Arena
Paradise, NV
Attendance: 13,151
Referees: Mike Reed, Mike Scyphers, Michael Irving

ESPN

Mar 15
8:30 pm

Recap

Utah Utes 45, Oregon Ducks 64
Scoring by half: 15–29, 30–35
Pts: Brandon Taylor 13; Rebs: Jason Washburn 9 Asts: Jordan Loveridge 3	Pts: 2 tied with 14; Rebs: E.J. Singler 8 Asts: Dominic Artis 4

MGM Grand Garden Arena
Paradise, NV
Attendance: 13,151
Referees: Chris Rastatter, Kevin Brill, Tommy Nunez

ESPN

Mar 16
8:00 pm

Recap

Oregon Ducks 78, #21 UCLA Bruins 69
Scoring by half: 41–32, 37–37
Pts: Carlos Emory 20; Rebs: Arsalan Kazemi 12; Asts: 2 tied with 3	Pts: 2 tied with 14; Rebs: Travis Wear 7 Asts: Larry Drew II 6

MGM Grand Garden Arena
Paradise, NV
Attendance: 11,101
Referees: Tony Padilla, Gregory Nixon, Michael Greenstein

== Tournament notes ==
- For the first time, the tournament was held in a city and state outside of the conference school locations. Previous title games were held in Arizona or California.
- Stanford set a Pac-12 Tournament record for fewest free-throws attempted (1) and tied the record for fewest makes (1) in an 89–88 overtime loss to Arizona State.
- Utah had only 15 pts. in the 1st half vs. Oregon (with 29), setting a tournament record for fewest points in a half.
- Josh Huestis of Stanford had 6 blocked shots in a game vs. Arizona State. This set a tournament record which stands today.
- Five teams were invited to the 2013 NCAA men's basketball tournament: Oregon, UCLA, Arizona, Colorado, and California.

== All-Tournament Team ==
- Jahii Carson (Arizona State)
- Jordan Adams (UCLA)
- Larry Drew II (UCLA)
- Arsalan Kazemi (Oregon)
- Damyean Dotson (Oregon)
- Johnathan Loyd (Oregon)

== Most Outstanding Player ==
- Johnathan Loyd (Oregon)

== Hall of Honor inductees ==
Induction for the Hall of Honor on March 16, 2013, were: Jason Gardner (Arizona), Dennis Hamilton (Arizona State), Shareef Abdur-Rahim (California), Cliff Meely (Colorado), Chuck Rask (Oregon), Charlie Sitton (Oregon State), Ron Tomsic (Stanford), Lucius Allen (UCLA), Forrest Twogood (USC), Keith Van Horn (Utah), Nate Robinson (Washington) and Jim Keen (Washington State).

== See also ==
- 2013 NCAA Men's Division I Basketball Tournament
