= 2012–13 California Golden Bears men's basketball team =

American college basketball season

2012–13 California Golden Bears men's basketball

DirecTV Classic Champions

NCAA tournament, Round of 32
- Conference: Pac-12 Conference
- Record: 21–12 (12–6 Pac-12)
- Head coach: Mike Montgomery
- Assistant coaches: Travis DeCuire; Gregg Gottlieb; John Montgomery
- Home arena: Haas Pavilion

2012–13 Pac-12 Conference men's basketball standings
	Conf.				Overall
Team	W		L	PCT	W		L	PCT
No. 24 UCLA	13	–	5	.722	25	–	10	.714
No. 25 Oregon †	12	–	6	.667	28	–	9	.757
No. 21 Arizona	12	–	6	.667	27	–	8	.771
California	12	–	6	.667	21	–	12	.636
Colorado	10	–	8	.556	21	–	12	.636
Arizona State	9	–	9	.500	22	–	13	.629
Stanford	9	–	9	.500	19	–	15	.559
Washington	9	–	9	.500	18	–	16	.529
USC	9	–	9	.500	14	–	18	.438
Utah	5	–	13	.278	15	–	18	.455
Oregon State	4	–	14	.222	14	–	18	.438
Washington State	4	–	14	.222	13	–	19	.406
† Conference tournament winner As of March 23, 2013; Rankings from AP Poll

The 2012–13 California Golden Bears men's basketball team represented the University of California, Berkeley in the 2012–13 NCAA Division I men's basketball season. This was head coach Mike Montgomery's fifth season at California. The Golden Bears played their home games at Haas Pavilion and participated in the Pac-12 Conference. They finished the season 21–12, 12–6 in Pac-12 play to finish in a three-way tie for second place. They lost in the quarterfinals of the Pac-12 tournament to Utah. They received an at-large bid to the 2013 NCAA tournament, where they defeated UNLV in the second round before losing in the third round to Syracuse.

== Roster ==
#	Name	Height	Weight (lbs.)	Position	Class	Hometown	Previous team(s)
1	Justin Cobbs	6'2"	190	G	RS Jr.	Los Angeles, CA, U.S.	Minnesota
3	Tyrone Wallace	6'4"	186	G	Fr.	Bakersfield, CA, U.S.	Bakersfield HS
10	Garrett Galvin	6'4"	198	G	Fr.	Del Mar, CA, U.S.	Torrey Pines HS
12	Brandon Smith	6'0"	180	G	Sr.	San Ramon, CA, U.S.	De La Salle HS
14	Christian Behrens	6'9"	225	F	So.	Maple Valley, WA, U.S.	Tahoma Sr. HS
15	Bak Bak	6'9"	240	F	Sr.	Sun Valley, CA, U.S.	Village Christian HS
20	Kahlil Johnson	6'7"	206	F	Fr.	Los Angeles, CA, U.S.	Price HS
21	Jeff Powers	6'7"	223	G	RS Jr.	Clayton, CA, U.S.	Denver
22	Kaileb Rodriguez	6'9"	225	F	Fr.	Highlands Ranch, CO, U.S.	ThunderRidge HS
23	Allen Crabbe	6'6"	210	G	Jr.	Los Angeles, CA, U.S.	Price HS
24	Ricky Kreklow	6'6"	210	G	RS So.	Columbia, MO, U.S.	Missouri
34	Robert Thurman	6'10"	265	F	Sr.	North Edwards, CA, U.S.	Norwich
35	Richard Solomon	6'10"	235	F	Jr.	Los Angeles, CA, U.S.	Price HS
41	Geoffrey Frid	7'1"	235	C	Fr.	Carlsbad, CA, U.S.	Impact Academy
45	David Kravish	6'10"	220	F	So.	Lee's Summit, MO, U.S.	Lee's Summit North HS

=== Coaching staff ===
Name	Position	Year at Cal	Alma mater (year)
Mike Montgomery	Head coach	4th	Colorado State (1976)
Gregg Gottlieb	Assistant coach	6th	UCLA (1995)
Travis DeCuire	Assistant coach	4th	Montana (1994)
John Montgomery	Assistant coach	4th	Loyola Marymount (2007)

== Schedule and results ==
Date time, TV	Rank^{#}	Opponent^{#}	Result	Record	Site (attendance) city, state
Exhibition
11/06/2012*; 7:30 pm		San Francisco State	W 89–80	–	Haas Pavilion (4,840); Berkeley, CA
Regular season
11/11/2012*; 7:00 pm, P12N		Cal State Bakersfield	W 78–65	1–0	Haas Pavilion (8,715); Berkeley, CA
11/13/2012*; 6:30 pm, P12N		Pepperdine	W 79–62	2–0	Haas Pavilion (6,403); Berkeley, CA
11/16/2012*; 5:00 pm, RTRM		at Denver	W 72–61	3–0	Magness Arena (4,337); Denver, CO
11/22/2012*; 8:30 pm, ESPN2		vs. Drake; DIRECTV Classic Quarterfinals	W 73–70	4–0	Anaheim Convention Center (1,087); Anaheim, CA
11/23/2012*; 9:00 pm, ESPN2		vs. Georgia Tech; DIRECTV Classic semifinals	W 68–57	5–0	Anaheim Convention Center (1,627); Anaheim, CA
11/25/2012*; 6:00 pm, ESPN2		vs. Pacific; DIRECTV Classic Championship	W 78–58	6–0	Anaheim Convention Center (2,527); Anaheim, CA
12/02/2012*; 1:00 pm, BTN		at Wisconsin	L 56–81	6–1	Kohl Center (16,596); Madison, WI
12/09/2012*; 3:00 pm, ESPNU		No. 21 UNLV	L 75–76	6–2	Haas Pavilion (8,724); Berkeley, CA
12/15/2012*; 8:00 pm, P12N		No. 16 Creighton	L 64–74	6–3	Haas Pavilion (8,116); Berkeley, CA
12/18/2012*; 8:00 pm, P12N		UC Santa Barbara	W 68–59	7–3	Haas Pavilion (6,489); Berkeley, CA
12/22/2012*; 2:00 pm, P12N		Prairie View A&M	W 85–53	8–3	Haas Pavilion (5,427); Berkeley, CA
12/29/2012*; 5:00 pm, P12N		Harvard	L 62–67	8–4	Haas Pavilion (8,334); Berkeley, CA
01/03/2013; 8:00 pm, FSN		at UCLA	L 65–79	8–5 (0–1)	Pauley Pavilion (9,406); Los Angeles, CA
01/05/2013; 8:00 pm, FSN		at USC	W 72–64	9–5 (1–1)	Galen Center (4,372); Los Angeles, CA
01/09/2013; 8:00 pm, ESPN2		Washington	L 47–62	9–6 (1–2)	Haas Pavilion (6,856); Berkeley, CA
01/12/2013; 1:00 pm, P12N		Washington State	W 67–54	10–6 (2–2)	Haas Pavilion (7,347); Berkeley, CA
01/19/2013; 1:30 pm, FSN		at Stanford	L 59–69	10–7 (2–3)	Maples Pavilion (5,877); Stanford, CA
01/24/2013; 5:30 pm, P12N		at Utah	W 62–57	11–7 (3–3)	Jon M. Huntsman Center (8,880); Salt Lake City, UT
01/27/2013; 12:30 pm, FSN		at Colorado	L 71–81	11–8 (3–4)	Coors Events Center (10,132); Boulder, CO
01/31/2013; 7:00 pm, ESPNU		Oregon State	W 71–68	12–8 (4–4)	Haas Pavilion (8,261); Berkeley, CA
02/02/2013; 1:30 pm, FSN		No. 10 Oregon	W 58–54	13–8 (5–4)	Haas Pavilion (9,457); Berkeley, CA
02/07/2013; 6:30 pm, P12N		at Arizona State	L 62–66	13–9 (5–5)	Wells Fargo Arena (6,010); Tempe, AZ
02/10/2013; 4:00 pm, P12N		at No. 7 Arizona	W 77–69	14–9 (6–5)	McKale Center (14,545); Tucson, AZ
02/14/2013; 6:00 pm, ESPN2		UCLA	W 76–63	15–9 (7–5)	Haas Pavilion (9,854); Berkeley, CA
02/17/2013; 7:00 pm, FSN		USC	W 76–68	16–9 (8–5)	Haas Pavilion (9,127); Berkeley, CA
02/21/2013; 6:00 pm, ESPN2		at No. 23 Oregon	W 48–46	17–9 (9–5)	Matthew Knight Arena (8,223); Eugene, OR
02/23/2013; 3:00 pm, P12N		at Oregon State	W 60–59	18–9 (10–5)	Gill Coliseum (6,034); Corvallis, OR
02/28/2013; 6:00 pm, ESPNU		Utah	W 64–46	19–9 (11–5)	Haas Pavilion (7,091); Berkeley, CA
03/02/2013; 2:00 pm, ESPNU		Colorado	W 62–46	20–9 (12–5)	Haas Pavilion (10,679); Berkeley, CA
03/06/2013; 8:00 pm, ESPN2		Stanford	L 70–83	20–10 (12–6)	Haas Pavilion (11,877); Berkeley, CA
Pac-12 tournament
03/14/2013; 6:00 pm, P12N		vs. Utah; Quarterfinals	L 69–79 ^{OT}	20–11	MGM Grand Garden Arena (10,566); Paradise, NV
NCAA tournament
03/21/2013*; 4:45 pm, truTV	No. (12 E)	vs. (5 E) UNLV; Second Round	W 64–61	21–11	HP Pavilion (17,997); San Jose, CA
03/23/2013*; 6:40 pm, TBS	No. (12 E)	vs. (4 E) Syracuse; Third Round	L 60–66	21–12	HP Pavilion (18,030); San Jose, CA
*Non-conference game. ^{#}Rankings from AP Poll. (#) Tournament seedings in parentheses. All times are in Pacific Time (#) during NCAA Tournament is Seed with Region E=East.

== Notes ==
- March 2013 – Senior guard Allen Crabbe was named the 2012–13 Pac-12 Men's Basketball Player of the Year.
