= 2012–13 Utah Utes men's basketball team =

American college basketball season

2012–13 Utah Utes men's basketball
- Conference: Pac-12 Conference
- Record: 15–18 (5–13 Pac–12)
- Head coach: Larry Krystkowiak (2nd season)
- Assistant coaches: Tommy Connor; DeMarlo Slocum; Andy Hill
- Home arena: Jon M. Huntsman Center

2012–13 Pac-12 Conference men's basketball standings
	Conf.				Overall
Team	W		L	PCT	W		L	PCT
No. 24 UCLA	13	–	5	.722	25	–	10	.714
No. 25 Oregon †	12	–	6	.667	28	–	9	.757
No. 21 Arizona	12	–	6	.667	27	–	8	.771
California	12	–	6	.667	21	–	12	.636
Colorado	10	–	8	.556	21	–	12	.636
Arizona State	9	–	9	.500	22	–	13	.629
Stanford	9	–	9	.500	19	–	15	.559
Washington	9	–	9	.500	18	–	16	.529
USC	9	–	9	.500	14	–	18	.438
Utah	5	–	13	.278	15	–	18	.455
Oregon State	4	–	14	.222	14	–	18	.438
Washington State	4	–	14	.222	13	–	19	.406
† Conference tournament winner As of March 23, 2013; Rankings from AP Poll

The 2012–13 Utah Utes men's basketball team represented the University of Utah during the 2012–13 NCAA Division I men's basketball season. They play their home games at the Jon M. Huntsman Center in Salt Lake City, Utah, and were a member of the Pac-12 Conference. They were led by their second year head coach Larry Krystkowiak. They finished the season 15–18, 5–13 in Pac-12 play to finish in tenth place. They advanced to the semifinals of the Pac-12 tournament where they lost to Oregon.

== Roster ==
#	Name	Position	Height	Weight (lbs.)	Class	Hometown	Last college or high school
1	Glen Dean	G	5–10	170	RS Jr.	Seattle, WA	Eastern Washington
2	Aaron Dotson	G/F	6–4	202	RS Jr.	Seattle, WA	LSU
3	Justin Seymour	G	6–3	205	Fr.	Marietta, GA	Joseph Wheeler HS
5	Jarred DuBois	G	6–3	172	GS	Inglewood, CA	Loyola Marymount
10	Renan Lenz	F	6–9	221	Jr.	Santo Angelo, BRA	Arizona Western College
11	Brandon Taylor	G	5-10	162	Fr.	West Hollywood, CA	Pacific Hills HS
13	Alex Mortensen	G	6–1	171	So.	Springville, UT	Springville HS
14	Dakarai Tucker	F/G	6–5	187	Fr.	Gardena, CA	Serra HS
20	Ryan Osterloh	G	6–3	188	Sr.	Sandy, UT	Salt Lake CC
21	Jordan Loveridge	F	6–6	230	Fr.	West Jordan, UT	West Jordan HS
31	Dallin Bachynski	C	7–0	248	So.	Calgary, AB	Southern Utah
34	Harry Whitt	C	6–10	220	So.	Tucson, AZ	Southern Illinois
40	Xan Ricketts	F	6–7	214	RS So.	Sandy, UT	Simon Fraser University
41	Jeremy Olsen	F	6–10	228	RS Fr.	Lawerence, GA	Collins Hills HS
42	Jason Washburn	C	6–10	242	RS Sr.	Battle Creek, MI	Battle Creek Central HS
43	Cedric Martin	G	6–4	203	Sr.	Minneapolis, MN	Lee College
51	David Foster	C	7–3	261	RS Sr.	Lake Forest, CA	El Toro HS

== Schedule and results ==
All home games and conference road games will be broadcast on television on FSN, ESPN Networks, or Pac-12 Rocky Mountain with a tape delay and sometimes live broadcast on the national Pac-12 Network. All games will be broadcast on the radio and streamed online by KALL 700 Sports, home of the Utah Utes, unless the November 23 game interferes with the football broadcast. That game could be broadcast on KUDE Rock 99.1.

Date time, TV	Rank^{#}	Opponent^{#}	Result	Record	Site (attendance) city, state
Exhibition
11/02/2012*; 7:00 pm		Simon Fraser	W 71–36	–	Jon M. Huntsman Center (N/A); Salt Lake City, UT
Regular season
11/09/2012*; 7:00 pm, P12N		Willamette	W 104–47	1–0	Jon M. Huntsman Center (6,242); Salt Lake City, UT
11/16/2012*; 7:00 pm, P12N		Sacramento State	L 71–74	1–1	Jon M. Huntsman Center (6,263); Salt Lake City, UT
11/21/2012*; 7:00 pm, P12N		Idaho State; Utah Thanksgiving Tournament	W 57–46	2–1	Jon M. Huntsman Center (7,898); Salt Lake City, UT
11/23/2012*; 5:00 pm, P12N		Central Michigan; Utah Thanksgiving Tournament	W 67–51	3–1	Jon M. Huntsman Center (7,599); Salt Lake City, UT
11/24/2012*; 7:30 pm, P12N		Wright State; Utah Thanksgiving Tournament	W 66–54	4–1	Jon M. Huntsman Center (7,649); Salt Lake City, UT
11/28/2012*; 8:00 pm		at SMU	L 55–62	4–2	Moody Coliseum (3,501); University Park, TX
11/30/2012*; 6:00 pm		at Texas State	W 74–69	5–2	Strahan Coliseum (2,237); San Marcos, TX
12/05/2012*; 6:30 pm, P12N		Boise State	W 76–55	6–2	Jon M. Huntsman Center (7,896); Salt Lake City, UT
12/08/2012*; 7:00 pm, BYUtv		at BYU	L 58–61	6–3	Marriott Center (16,109); Provo, UT
12/18/2012*; 7:00 pm, P12N		SMU	W 62–53	7–3	Jon M. Huntsman Center (7,563); Salt Lake City, UT
12/21/2012*; 8:30 pm, P12N		Cal State Northridge	L 71–76	7–4	Jon M. Huntsman Center (N/A); Salt Lake City, UT
12/28/2012*; 7:30 pm, P12N		College of Idaho	W 72–38	8–4	Jon M. Huntsman Center (7,943); Salt Lake City, UT
01/02/2013; 8:00 pm, P12N		at Arizona State	L 54–55 ^{OT}	8–5 (0–1)	Wells Fargo Arena (5,314); Tucson, AZ
01/05/2013; 3:00 pm, P12N		at No. 3 Arizona	L 57–60	8–6 (0–2)	McKale Center (14,545); Tucson, AZ
01/10/2013; 7:30 pm, P12N		UCLA	L 53–57	8–7 (0–3)	Jon M. Huntsman Center (9,510); Salt Lake City, UT
01/12/2013; 4:00 pm, P12N		USC	L 59–76	8–8 (0–4)	Jon M. Huntsman Center (11,027); Salt Lake City, UT
01/16/2013; 7:30 pm, P12N		at Washington State	L 65–75	8–9 (0–5)	Beasley Coliseum (4,240); Pullman, WA
01/19/2013; 9:00 pm, ESPNU		at Washington	W 74–65	9–9 (1–5)	Alaska Airlines Arena (8,598); Seattle, WA
01/24/2013; 6:30 pm, P12N		California	L 57–62	9–10 (1–6)	Jon M. Huntsman Center (8,880); Salt Lake City, UT
01/27/2013; 7:00 pm, P12N		Stanford	L 56–87	9–11 (1–7)	Jon M. Huntsman Center (7,769); Salt Lake City, UT
02/02/2013; 12:30 pm, FSN		Colorado	W 58–55	10–11 (2–7)	Jon M. Huntsman Center (10,977); Salt Lake City, UT
02/06/2013; 8:00 pm, P12N		at Oregon State	L 64–82	10–12 (2–8)	Gill Coliseum (4,118); Corvallis, OR
02/09/2013; 6:00 pm, P12N		at No. 19 Oregon	L 64–73	10–13 (2–9)	Matthew Knight Arena (9,041); Eugene, OR
02/13/2013; 6:00 pm, P12N		Arizona State	W 60–55	11–13 (3–9)	Jon M. Huntsman Center (9,062); Salt Lake City, UT
02/17/2013; 1:00 pm, P12N		No. 9 Arizona	L 64–68	11–14 (3–10)	Jon M. Huntsman Center (11,712); Salt Lake City, UT
02/21/2013; 8:00 pm, P12N		at Colorado	L 50–60	11–15 (3–11)	Coors Events Center (9,823); Boulder, CO
02/28/2013; 7:00 pm, ESPNU		at California	L 46–64	11–16 (3–12)	Haas Pavilion (7,091); Berkeley, CA
03/03/2013; 3:00 pm, P12N		at Stanford	L 66–84	11–17 (3–13)	Maples Pavilion (5,433); Palo Alto, CA
03/07/2013; 7:00 pm, ESPNU		Oregon State	W 72–61	12–17 (4–13)	Jon M. Huntsman Center (8,019); Salt Lake City, UT
03/09/2013; 12:30 pm, P12N		No. 19 Oregon	W 72–62	13–17 (5–13)	Jon M. Huntsman Center (11,628); Salt Lake City, UT
2013 Pac-12 Conference men's basketball tournament
03/13/2013; 7:00 pm, P12N		vs. USC; First Round	W 69–66	14–17	MGM Grand Garden Arena (8,566); Paradise, NV
03/14/2013; 7:00 pm, P12N		vs. California; Quarterfinals	W 79–69 ^{OT}	15–17	MGM Grand Garden Arena (10,566); Paradise, NV
03/15/2013; 9:41 pm, ESPN		vs. Oregon; Semifinals	L 45–64	15–18	MGM Grand Garden Arena (13,151); Paradise, NV
*Non-conference game. ^{#}Rankings from AP Poll/Coaches' Poll. (#) Tournament seedings in parentheses. All times are in Mountain Time.
