= 2012–13 Oregon Ducks men's basketball team =

American college basketball season

2012–13 Oregon Ducks men's basketball

Pac-12 Tournament Champions

NCAA tournament, Sweet Sixteen
- Conference: Pac-12 Conference

Ranking
- Coaches: No. 15
- AP: No. 25
- Record: 28–9 (12–6 Pac-12)
- Head coach: Dana Altman
- Assistant coaches: Brian Fish; Kevin McKenna; Tony Stubblefield
- Home arena: Matthew Knight Arena

2012–13 Pac-12 Conference men's basketball standings
	Conf.				Overall
Team	W		L	PCT	W		L	PCT
No. 24 UCLA	13	–	5	.722	25	–	10	.714
No. 25 Oregon †	12	–	6	.667	28	–	9	.757
No. 21 Arizona	12	–	6	.667	27	–	8	.771
California	12	–	6	.667	21	–	12	.636
Colorado	10	–	8	.556	21	–	12	.636
Arizona State	9	–	9	.500	22	–	13	.629
Stanford	9	–	9	.500	19	–	15	.559
Washington	9	–	9	.500	18	–	16	.529
USC	9	–	9	.500	14	–	18	.438
Utah	5	–	13	.278	15	–	18	.455
Oregon State	4	–	14	.222	14	–	18	.438
Washington State	4	–	14	.222	13	–	19	.406
† Conference tournament winner As of March 23, 2013; Rankings from AP Poll

The 2012–13 Oregon Ducks men's basketball team represented the University of Oregon during the 2012–13 NCAA Division I men's basketball season. The Ducks, led by their third year head coach Dana Altman, were members of the Pac-12 Conference and played their home games at Matthew Knight Arena. They finished with a record of 28–9 overall, 12–6 in Pac-12 play to finish in a three-way tie for second place. They were champions of the Pac-12 tournament, defeating UCLA in the championship game, to earn an automatic bid to the 2013 NCAA tournament where they defeated Oklahoma State in the second round and Saint Louis in the third round to advance to the Sweet Sixteen where they lost to Louisville.

== Recruits ==
College recruiting information
Name	Hometown	School	Height	Weight	Commit date
Dominic Artis; PG	Richmond, California	Findlay College Prep	5 ft 11 in (1.80 m)	165 lb (75 kg)	Oct 31, 2011
Dominic Artis; PG	Recruit ratings: Scout: Rivals: (94)				
Damyean Dotson; SF	Houston, Texas	Jack Yates	6 ft 6 in (1.98 m)	181 lb (82 kg)	Sep 25, 2010
Damyean Dotson; SF	Recruit ratings: Scout: Rivals: (90)				
Fred Richardson; SF	Friendswood, Texas	Clear Brook	6 ft 5 in (1.96 m)	N/A	May 8, 2012
Fred Richardson; SF	Recruit ratings: Scout: Rivals: (90)				
Ben Carter; PF	Las Vegas, Nevada	Bishop Gorman	6 ft 8 in (2.03 m)	215 lb (98 kg)	Nov 7, 2011
Ben Carter; PF	Recruit ratings: Scout: Rivals: (89)				
Willie Moore; SG	Cincinnati, Ohio	Aiken	6 ft 3 in (1.91 m)	175 lb (79 kg)	May 8, 2012
Willie Moore; SG	Recruit ratings: Scout: Rivals: (82)				
Devon Branch; SG	Aberdeen, Maryland	Cloud County Community College	6 ft 5 in (1.96 m)	175 lb (79 kg)	Apr 8, 2012
Devon Branch; SG	Recruit ratings: Scout: Rivals: (N/A)				
Overall recruit ranking: Scout: nr Rivals: nr ESPN: nr
Note: In many cases, Scout, Rivals, 247Sports, On3, and ESPN may conflict in their listings of height and weight.; In these cases, the average was taken. ESPN grades are on a 100-point scale.; Sources: "ESPN". ESPN.; "2012 Team Ranking". Rivals.

== Roster ==
2012–13 Oregon Ducks men's basketball team
Players
Coaches

Pos.	#	Name	Height	Weight	Year	Hometown
G	1	Dominic Artis	6 ft 1 in (1.85 m)	185 lb (84 kg)	Fr	Oakland, California
G	4	Nicholas Lucenti	6 ft 2 in (1.88 m)	197 lb (89 kg)	Jr	Los Angeles, California
G	5	Fred Richardson III	6 ft 4 in (1.93 m)	202 lb (92 kg)	Fr	Houston, Texas
G	10	Johnathan Loyd	5 ft 8 in (1.73 m)	165 lb (75 kg)	Jr	Las Vegas, Nevada
G	12	Coleton Baker	6 ft 3 in (1.91 m)	200 lb (91 kg)	Jr	Sutherlin, Oregon
F	14	Arsalan Kazemi	6 ft 7 in (2.01 m)	226 lb (103 kg)	Sr	Isfahan, Iran
C	20	Waverly Austin	6 ft 11 in (2.11 m)	270 lb (122 kg)	Jr	Fredericksburg, Virginia
G	21	Damyean Dotson	6 ft 5 in (1.96 m)	202 lb (92 kg)	Fr	Houston, Texas
G	24	Willie Moore	6 ft 3 in (1.91 m)	199 lb (90 kg)	Fr	Cincinnati, Ohio
F	25	E. J. Singler	6 ft 6 in (1.98 m)	215 lb (98 kg)	Sr	Medford, Oregon
F	32	Ben Carter	6 ft 8 in (2.03 m)	219 lb (99 kg)	Fr	Las Vegas, Nevada
F	33	Carlos Emory	6 ft 5 in (1.96 m)	205 lb (93 kg)	Sr	Bloomington, Minnesota
C	40	Austin Kuemper	6 ft 9 in (2.06 m)	225 lb (102 kg)	RS Fr	Portland, Oregon
C	55	Tony Woods	6 ft 11 in (2.11 m)	243 lb (110 kg)	RS Sr	Rome, Georgia

Head coach

- Dana Altman (Eastern New Mexico)

Assistant coach(es)

- Brian Fish (Marshall)
- Kevin McKenna (Creighton)
- Tony Stubblefield (Omaha)

Legend

- (C) Team captain
- (S) Suspended
- (I) Ineligible
- (W) Walk-on
- Injured
- Current redshirt

Roster
Last update: 2012-10-09

=== Depth chart ===
Pos.	Starting 5	Bench
C	Tony Woods	Waverly Austin
PF	Arsalan Kazemi	Ben Carter
SF	E.J. Singler	Carlos Emory
SG	Damyean Dotson
PG	Dominic Artis	Johnathan Loyd

== Schedule ==
Date time, TV	Rank^{#}	Opponent^{#}	Result	Record	Site (attendance) city, state
Exhibition
10/29/2012*; 7:00 pm		Concordia (OR)	W 102–75	–	Matthew Knight Arena (5,616); Eugene, OR
11/05/2012*; 7:00 pm		Southwestern Oklahoma State	W 82–65	–	Matthew Knight Arena (5,448); Eugene, OR
Regular season
11/10/2012*; 4:30 pm, P12N		Northern Arizona; Global Sports Classic	W 83–73	1–0	Matthew Knight Arena (5,768); Eugene, OR
11/12/2012*; 6:30 pm, P12N		Portland State	W 80–69	2–0	Matthew Knight Arena (5,577); Eugene, OR
11/16/2012*; 8:00 pm, P12N		Vanderbilt	W 74–48	3–0	Matthew Knight Arena (9,137); Eugene, OR
11/19/2012*; 8:00 pm, P12N		Jacksonville State; Global Sports Classic	W 67–45	4–0	Matthew Knight Arena (5,163); Eugene, OR
11/23/2012*; 6:00 pm, CBSSN		at No. 18 UNLV; Global Sports Classic	W 83–79	5–0	Thomas & Mack Center (16,730); Paradise, NV
11/24/2012*; 7:30 pm, CBSSN		vs. No. 22 Cincinnati; Global Sports Classic	L 66–77	5–1	Thomas & Mack Center (13,954); Paradise, NV
11/29/2012*; 7:00 pm, P12N		UTSA	W 95–78	6–1	Matthew Knight Arena (5,204); Eugene, OR
12/01/2012*; 7:00 pm, P12N		Arkansas-Pine Bluff	W 80–59	7–1	Matthew Knight Arena (5,281); Eugene, OR
12/08/2012*; 3:00 pm, P12N		Idaho State	W 87–35	8–1	Matthew Knight Arena (5,328); Eugene, OR
12/15/2012*; 1:30 pm, FSN		Nebraska	W 60–38	9–1	Matthew Knight Arena (6,102); Eugene, OR
12/19/2012*; 5:00 pm, CBSSN		at UTEP	L 84–91 ^{3OT}	9–2	Don Haskins Center (8,512); El Paso, TX
12/22/2012*; 12:00 pm, P12N		Houston Baptist	W 91–50	10–2	Matthew Knight Arena (5,284); Eugene, OR
12/31/2012*; 4:00 pm, P12N		Nevada	W 56–43	11–2	Matthew Knight Arena (5,817); Eugene, OR
01/06/2013; 7:00 pm, FSN		at Oregon State; Civil War	W 79–66	12–2 (1–0)	Gill Coliseum (8,612); Corvallis, OR
01/10/2013; 6:00 pm, ESPN2		No. 4 Arizona	W 70–66	13–2 (2–0)	Matthew Knight Arena (9,544); Eugene, OR
01/13/2013; 6:00 pm, P12N		Arizona State	W 68–65	14–2 (3–0)	Matthew Knight Arena (7,813); Eugene, OR
01/17/2013; 8:00 pm, ESPNU	No. 21	at USC	W 76–74	15–2 (4–0)	Galen Center (4,722); Los Angeles, CA
01/19/2013; 1:00 pm, CBS	No. 21	at No. 24 UCLA	W 76–67	16–2 (5–0)	Pauley Pavilion (12,254); Los Angeles, CA
01/23/2013; 6:30 pm, P12N	No. 16	Washington State	W 68–61	17–2 (6–0)	Matthew Knight Arena (6,946); Eugene, OR
01/26/2013; 4:00 pm, P12N	No. 16	Washington	W 81–76	18–2 (7–0)	Matthew Knight Arena (12,364); Eugene, OR
01/30/2013; 8:00 pm, ESPNU	No. 10	at Stanford	L 52–76	18–3 (7–1)	Maples Pavilion (4,816); Stanford, CA
02/02/2013; 1:30 pm, FSN	No. 10	at California	L 54–58	18–4 (7–2)	Haas Pavilion (9,457); Berkeley, CA
02/07/2013; 7:00 pm, ESPNU	No. 19	Colorado	L 47–48	18–5 (7–3)	Matthew Knight Arena (8,862); Eugene, OR
02/09/2013; 5:00 pm, P12N	No. 19	Utah	W 73–64	19–5 (8–3)	Matthew Knight Arena (9,041); Eugene, OR
02/13/2013; 8:00 pm, ESPN2	No. 23	at Washington	W 65–52	20–5 (9–3)	Alaska Airlines Arena (8,466); Seattle, WA
02/16/2013; 4:00 pm, P12N	No. 23	at Washington State	W 79–77 ^{OT}	21–5 (10–3)	Beasley Coliseum (5,216); Pullman, WA
02/21/2013; 6:00 pm, ESPN2	No. 23	California	L 46–48	21–6 (10–4)	Matthew Knight Arena (8,223); Eugene, OR
02/23/2013; 5:00 pm, P12N	No. 23	Stanford	W 77–66	22–6 (11–4)	Matthew Knight Arena (12,364); Eugene, OR
02/28/2013; 8:00 pm, ESPNU	No. 24	Oregon State; Civil War	W 85–75	23–6 (12–4)	Matthew Knight Arena (10,621); Eugene, OR
03/07/2013; 6:00 pm, ESPN2	No. 19	at Colorado	L 53–76	23–7 (12–5)	Coors Events Center (11,013); Boulder, CO
03/09/2013; 11:30 am, P12N	No. 19	at Utah	L 62–72	23–8 (12–6)	Jon M. Huntsman Center (11,628); Salt Lake City, UT
Pac-12 tournament
03/14/2013; 8:54 pm, ESPNU	(3)	vs. (6) Washington; Quarterfinals	W 80–77 ^{OT}	24–8	MGM Grand Garden Arena (10,566); Paradise, NV
03/15/2013; 8:41 pm, ESPN	(3)	vs. (10) Utah; Semifinals	W 64–45	25–8	MGM Grand Garden Arena (13,151); Paradise, NV
03/16/2013; 8:00 pm, ESPN	(3)	vs. (1) No. 21 UCLA; Championship	W 78–69	26–8	MGM Grand Garden Arena (11,101); Paradise, NV
NCAA tournament
03/21/2013*; 1:49 pm, TNT	No. 25 (12 MW)	vs. No. 17 (5 MW) Oklahoma State; Second Round	W 68–55	27–8	HP Pavilion (16,836); San Jose, CA
03/23/2013*; 4:10 pm, TBS	No. 25 (12 MW)	vs. No. 13 (4 MW) Saint Louis; Third Round	W 74–57	28–8	HP Pavilion (18,030); San Jose, CA
03/29/2013*; 4:15 pm, CBS	No. 25 (12 MW)	vs. No. 2 (1 MW) Louisville; Sweet Sixteen	L 69–77	28–9	Lucas Oil Stadium (35,520); Indianapolis, IN
*Non-conference game. ^{#}Rankings from AP Poll. (#) Tournament seedings in parentheses. All times are in Pacific Time. (#) during NCAA Tournament is seed with Region MW=Midwest.

== Notes ==
On March 12, 2013, Dana Altman was named the John R. Wooden Pac-12 head coach of the year.
