= 2012–13 Washington State Cougars men's basketball team =

American college basketball season

2012–13 Washington State Cougars men's basketball
- Conference: Pac-12 Conference
- Record: 13–19 (4–14 Pac-12)
- Head coach: Ken Bone
- Assistant coaches: Curtis Allen; Ben Johnson; Ray Lopes
- Home arena: Beasley Coliseum

2012–13 Pac-12 Conference men's basketball standings
	Conf.				Overall
Team	W		L	PCT	W		L	PCT
No. 24 UCLA	13	–	5	.722	25	–	10	.714
No. 25 Oregon †	12	–	6	.667	28	–	9	.757
No. 21 Arizona	12	–	6	.667	27	–	8	.771
California	12	–	6	.667	21	–	12	.636
Colorado	10	–	8	.556	21	–	12	.636
Arizona State	9	–	9	.500	22	–	13	.629
Stanford	9	–	9	.500	19	–	15	.559
Washington	9	–	9	.500	18	–	16	.529
USC	9	–	9	.500	14	–	18	.438
Utah	5	–	13	.278	15	–	18	.455
Oregon State	4	–	14	.222	14	–	18	.438
Washington State	4	–	14	.222	13	–	19	.406
† Conference tournament winner As of March 23, 2013; Rankings from AP Poll

The 2012–13 Washington State Cougars men's basketball team represented Washington State University during the 2012–13 NCAA Division I men's basketball season. The Cougars played their home games on Jack Friel Court at Beasley Coliseum in Pullman, Washington and were members of the Pac-12 Conference. They were led by fourth year head coach Ken Bone. They finished the season with a record of 13–19 overall, 4–14 in Pac-12 play to finish in a last place tie with Oregon State. They lost in the first round of the Pac-12 tournament to in-state rival Washington.

== Roster ==
Name	Number	Position	Height	Weight	Year	Hometown	Last School/College
Mike Ladd	2	Guard	6–5	195	RS Senior	Seattle, WA	Fresno State
DaVonté Lacy	3	Guard	6–3	206	Sophomore	Tacoma, WA	Curtis Sr. HS
Bryce Leavitt	4	Guard	6–4	184	Freshman	Kennewick, WA	Kennewick HS
Will DiIorio	5	Guard	6–5	190	Junior	Bainbridge Island, WA	Bainbridge HS
Brett Kingma	10	Guard	6–1	175	Sophomore	Mill Creek, WA	Oregon
Brock Motum	12	Forward	6–10	245	Senior	Brisbane, AUS	Australian Institute of Sport
James Hunter	13	Forward	6–9	250	Sophomore	Sydney, AUS	Gillette College
Richard Longrus Jr.	15	Forward	6–7	232	Freshman	Oakland, CA	Bishop O'Dowd HS
Jordan Railey	20	Center	6–10	264	Junior	Beaverton, OR	Iowa State
Dominic Ballard	21	Guard	6–4	199	RS Freshman	Seattle, WA	Bothell HS
Royce Woolridge	22	Guard	6–3	175	RS Sophomore	Phoenix, AZ	Kansas
D. J. Shelton	23	Forward	6–10	240	RS Junior	Rialto, CA	Citrus College
Keaton Hayenga	24	Forward	6–5	209	Junior	Sammamish, WA	Bellevue College
Que Johnson	32	Forward	6–5	205	Freshman	Pontiac, MI	Westwind Prep
Brett Boese	33	Forward	6–7	214	Freshman	Spokane, WA	Shadle Park HS
Dexter Kernich-Drew	34	Guard	6–6	182	RS Sophomore	Melbourne, AUS	Caulfield Grammar School

== Schedule ==
Date time, TV	Rank^{#}	Opponent^{#}	Result	Record	Site (attendance) city, state
Exhibition
11/06/2012*; 7:00 pm		St. Martin's	W 62–50	–	Beasley Coliseum (1,683); Pullman, WA
Regular Season
11/10/2012*; 4:30 pm, P12N		Eastern Washington; CBE Classic Hall of Fame	W 88–69	1–0	Beasley Coliseum (6,705); Pullman, WA
11/14/2012*; 7:00 pm, P12N		Utah Valley; CBE Classic Hall of Fame	W 72–49	2–0	Beasley Coliseum (2,023); Pullman, WA
11/16/2012*; 7:00 pm		at Pepperdine	L 56–58 ^{OT}	2–1	Firestone Fieldhouse (1,210); Malibu, CA
11/19/2012*; 7:00 pm, ESPN2		vs. No. 12 Kansas; CBE Classic Hall of Fame Semifinals	L 41–78	2–2	Sprint Center (8,408); Kansas City, MO
11/20/2012*; 4:00 pm, ESPN3		vs. Texas A&M; CBE Classic Hall of Fame 3rd place game	L 54–55	2–3	Sprint Center (10,315); Kansas City, MO
11/24/2012*; 6:30 pm, P12N		Arkansas-Pine Bluff	W 66–38	3–3	Beasley Coliseum (4,571); Pullman, WA
11/28/2012*; 7:00 pm, P12N		Idaho; Battle of the Palouse	W 64–55	4–3	Beasley Coliseum (4,791); Pullman, WA
12/01/2012*; 7:30 pm, P12N		Portland	W 72–60	5–3	Beasley Coliseum (4,513); Pullman, WA
12/05/2012*; 8:00 pm, ESPNU		No. 10 Gonzaga; Rivalry	L 69–71	5–4	Beasley Coliseum (9,367); Pullman, WA
12/09/2012*; 12:00 pm, P12N		Fresno State	W 59–50	6–4	Beasley Coliseum (2,651); Pullman, WA
12/13/2012*; 7:00 pm, P12N		Jackson State	W 52–41	7–4	Beasley Coliseum (2,686); Pullman, WA
12/21/2012*; 7:30 pm, P12N		vs. Buffalo; Cougar Hardwood Classic	W 65–54	8–4	KeyArena (7,269); Seattle, WA
12/29/2012*; 3:00 pm, P12N		vs. Idaho State	W 74–39	9–4	Toyota Center (4,590); Kennewick, WA
01/05/2013; 6:30 pm, ESPNU		Washington; Rivalry	L 63–68	9–5 (0–1)	Beasley Coliseum (7,711); Pullman, WA
01/09/2013; 7:00 pm, P12N		at Stanford	L 67–78	9–6 (0–2)	Maples Pavilion (4,476); Stanford, CA
01/12/2013; 1:00 pm, P12N		at California	L 54–67	9–7 (0–3)	Haas Pavilion (7,347); Berkeley, CA
01/16/2013; 6:30 pm, P12N		Utah	W 75–65	10–7 (1–3)	Beasley Coliseum (4,240); Pullman, WA
01/19/2013; 7:00 pm, P12N		Colorado	L 49–58	10–8 (1–4)	Beasley Coliseum (5,418); Pullman, WA
01/23/2013; 6:30 pm, P12N		at No. 16 Oregon	L 61–68	10–9 (1–5)	Matthew Knight Arena (6,946); Eugene, OR
01/26/2013; 2:00 pm, P12N		at Oregon State	W 71–68	11–9 (2–5)	Gill Coliseum (6,592); Corvallis, OR
01/31/2013; 8:00 pm, P12N		Arizona State	L 59–63	11–10 (2–6)	Beasley Coliseum (4,728); Pullman, WA
02/02/2013; 7:00 pm, P12N		No. 8 Arizona	L 65–79	11–11 (2–7)	Beasley Coliseum (6,002); Pullman, WA
02/07/2013; 8:30 pm, P12N		at USC	L 68–72	11–12 (2–8)	Galen Center (3,629); Los Angeles, CA
02/09/2013; 7:00 pm, P12N		at UCLA	L 62–76	11–13 (2–9)	Pauley Pavilion (10,090); Los Angeles, CA
02/13/2013; 7:00 pm, P12N		Oregon State	L 66–67	11–14 (2–10)	Beasley Coliseum (4,167); Pullman, WA
02/16/2013; 4:00 pm, P12N		No. 23 Oregon	L 77–79 ^{OT}	11–15 (2–11)	Beasley Coliseum (5,216); Pullman, WA
02/20/2013; 7:00 pm, P12N		at Arizona State	L 57–69	11–16 (2–12)	Wells Fargo Arena (8,236); Tempe, AZ
02/23/2013; 12:00 pm, FSN		at No. 12 Arizona	L 56–73	11–17 (2–13)	McKale Center (14,545); Tucson, AZ
03/03/2013; 12:30 pm, FSN		at Washington; Rivalry	L 68–72	11–18 (2–14)	Alaska Airlines Arena (8,508); Seattle, WA
03/06/2013; 6:30 pm, P12N		No. 23 UCLA	W 73–61	12–18 (3–14)	Beasley Coliseum (4,268); Pullman, WA
03/09/2013; 3:30 pm, P12N		USC	W 76–51	13–18 (4–14)	Beasley Coliseum (4,254); Pullman, WA
Pac-12 Conference tournament
03/13/2013; 8:30 pm, P12N		vs. Washington; First Round	L 62–64	13–19	MGM Grand Garden Arena (8,566); Paradise, NV
*Non-conference game. ^{#}Rankings from AP Poll. (#) Tournament seedings in parentheses. All times are in Pacific Time.
