= 2012–13 Washington Huskies men's basketball team =

American college basketball season

2012–13 Washington Huskies men's basketball

NIT, First Round
- Conference: Pac-12 Conference
- Record: 18–16 (9–9 Pac-12)
- Head coach: Lorenzo Romar
- Assistant coaches: Brad Jackson; Jim Shaw; Lamont Smith
- Home arena: Alaska Airlines Arena

2012–13 Pac-12 Conference men's basketball standings
	Conf.				Overall
Team	W		L	PCT	W		L	PCT
No. 24 UCLA	13	–	5	.722	25	–	10	.714
No. 25 Oregon †	12	–	6	.667	28	–	9	.757
No. 21 Arizona	12	–	6	.667	27	–	8	.771
California	12	–	6	.667	21	–	12	.636
Colorado	10	–	8	.556	21	–	12	.636
Arizona State	9	–	9	.500	22	–	13	.629
Stanford	9	–	9	.500	19	–	15	.559
Washington	9	–	9	.500	18	–	16	.529
USC	9	–	9	.500	14	–	18	.438
Utah	5	–	13	.278	15	–	18	.455
Oregon State	4	–	14	.222	14	–	18	.438
Washington State	4	–	14	.222	13	–	19	.406
† Conference tournament winner As of March 23, 2013; Rankings from AP Poll

The 2012–13 Washington Huskies men's basketball team represented the University of Washington in the 2012–13 NCAA Division I men's basketball season. This was head coach Lorenzo Romar's 11th season at Washington. The Huskies played their home games at Alaska Airlines Arena at Hec Edmundson Pavilion as members of the Pac-12 Conference. They finished the season 18–16, 9–9 in Pac-12 play to finish in a four-way tie for sixth place. They lost in the quarterfinals of the Pac-12 tournament to Oregon. They were invited to the 2013 NIT, where they lost in the first round to BYU.

== Departures ==
Name	Number	Pos.	Height	Weight	Year	Hometown	Reason for departure
Darnell Gant	44	F	6'8"	230	Senior	Los Angeles, CA	Graduated
Terrence Ross	31	G	6'6"	195	Sophomore	Portland, OR	NBA draft
Tony Wroten	14	G	6'5"	205	Freshman	Seattle, WA	NBA draft

== Recruits ==
College recruiting
Name	Hometown	School	Height	Weight	Commit date
Mark McLaughlin; SG	Kenmore, Washington	Tacoma Community College	6 ft 6 in (1.98 m)	190 lb (86 kg)	Apr 4, 2012
Mark McLaughlin; SG	Recruit ratings: Scout: Rivals: (N/A)				
Overall recruit ranking: Scout: nr Rivals: nr ESPN: nr
Note: In many cases, Scout, Rivals, 247Sports, On3, and ESPN may conflict in their listings of height and weight.; In these cases, the average was taken. ESPN grades are on a 100-point scale.; Sources: "ESPN". ESPN.; "2012 Team Ranking". Rivals.

== Roster ==
2012–13 Washington Huskies men's basketball team
Players
Coaches

Pos.	#	Name	Height	Weight	Year	Previous school	Hometown
G	0	Abdul Gaddy	6 ft 3 in (1.91 m)	195 lb (88 kg)	Sr	Bellarmine Prep	Tacoma, WA
F	2	Perris Blackwell (redshirt)	6 ft 9 in (2.06 m)	280 lb (127 kg)	Sr	San Francisco	Etiwanda, CA
G	4	Hikeem Stewart	6 ft 2 in (1.88 m)	185 lb (84 kg)	So	Rainier Beach HS	Seattle, WA
C	5	Aziz N’Diaye	7 ft 0 in (2.13 m)	260 lb (118 kg)	Sr	College of Southern Idaho	Dakar, SEN
F	10	Martin Breunig	6 ft 8 in (2.03 m)	210 lb (95 kg)	So	St. John’s NW Military Acad.	Leverkusen, GER
G	12	Andrew Andrews	6 ft 2 in (1.88 m)	195 lb (88 kg)	RS Fr	Benson Poly HS	Portland, OR
G	14	Dion Overstreet	5 ft 9 in (1.75 m)	175 lb (79 kg)	Jr	Edmonds CC	Venice, CA
G	15	Scott Suggs	6 ft 6 in (1.98 m)	195 lb (88 kg)	RS Sr	Washington HS	Washington, MO
G	22	Quinn Sterling (W)	6 ft 4 in (1.93 m)	185 lb (84 kg)	So	Mercer Island HS	Mercer Island, WA
G	23	C. J. Wilcox	6 ft 5 in (1.96 m)	195 lb (88 kg)	RS Jr	Pleasant Grove HS	Pleasant Grove, UT
F	30	Desmond Simmons	6 ft 7 in (2.01 m)	220 lb (100 kg)	RS So	Salesian HS	Vallejo, CA
F	33	Jernard Jarreau	6 ft 10 in (2.08 m)	220 lb (100 kg)	RS Fr	McDonogh No. 35 Sr. HS	New Orleans, LA
C	34	Gilles Dierickx (redshirt)	6 ft 11 in (2.11 m)	240 lb (109 kg)	So	Florida International	Ghent, BEL
F	40	Shawn Kemp Jr.	6 ft 9 in (2.06 m)	255 lb (116 kg)	So	Hargrave Military Acad.	Canton, GA

Head coach

- Lorenzo Romar (Washington)

Assistant coach(es)

- Brad Jackson (Washington State)
- Jim Shaw (Western Oregon)
- Lamont Smith (San Diego)

Legend

- (C) Team captain
- (S) Suspended
- (I) Ineligible
- (W) Walk-on
- Injured
- Current redshirt

Roster

=== Depth chart ===
Pos.	Starting 5	Bench
C	Aziz N’Diaye	Perris Blackwell
PF	Shawn Kemp Jr.	Austin Seferian-Jenkins
SF	Desmond Simmons	Martin Breuing
SG	C.J. Wilcox	Scott Suggs
PG	Abdul Gaddy	Hikeem Stewart

=== Coaching staff ===
Name	Position	Year at Washington	Alma mater (year)
Lorenzo Romar	Head coach	11th	Washington (1980)
Brad Jackson	Assistant coach	1st	Washington State (1975)
Jim Shaw	Assistant coach	9th	Western Oregon State (1985)
Lamont Smith	Assistant coach	1st	San Diego (1998)
Lance LaVetter	Director of basketball operations	11th	Northern Arizona (1992)

== Schedule ==
Date time, TV	Rank^{#}	Opponent^{#}	Result	Record	Site (attendance) city, state
Exhibition
10/24/2012*; 7:00 pm		Western Washington	W 88–78	–	Alaska Airlines Arena (8,077); Seattle, WA
Regular season
11/11/2012*; 5:00 pm, P12N		Loyola (MD); Hall of Fame Tip-Off	W 85–63	1–0	Alaska Airlines Arena (7,381); Seattle, WA
11/13/2012*; 6:30 pm, P12N		Albany; Hall of Fame Tip-Off	L 62–63	1–1	Alaska Airlines Arena (7,041); Seattle, WA
11/17/2012*; 4:30 pm, ESPN3		vs. Seton Hall; Hall of Fame Tip-Off Semifinals	W 84–73 ^{OT}	2–1	Mohegan Sun Arena (6,003); Uncasville, CT
11/18/2012*; 1:30 pm, ESPN2		vs. No. 4 Ohio State; Hall of Fame Tip-Off Finals	L 66–77	2–2	Mohegan Sun Arena (N/A); Uncasville, CT
11/24/2012*; 4:30 pm, P12N		Colorado State	L 55–73	2–3	Alaska Airlines Arena (7,409); Seattle, WA
11/28/2012*; 9:00 pm, P12N		Saint Louis	W 66–61	3–3	Alaska Airlines Arena (6,928); Seattle, WA
12/02/2012*; 4:00 pm, P12N		Cal State Fullerton	W 74–72	4–3	Alaska Airlines Arena (7,200); Seattle, WA
12/08/2012*; 5:00 pm, P12N		Nevada	L 73–76	4–4	Alaska Airlines Arena (7,724); Seattle, WA
12/13/2012*; 7:00 pm, RTNW		at Seattle	W 87–74	5–4	KeyArena (6,137); Seattle, WA
12/15/2012*; 4:00 pm, P12N		Jackson State	W 75–67	6–4	Alaska Airlines Arena (7,836); Seattle, WA
12/20/2012*; 6:00 pm, P12N		Cal Poly	W 75–62	7–4	Alaska Airlines Arena (7,874); Seattle, WA
12/22/2012*; 4:00 pm, P12N		Northern Illinois	W 67–57	8–4	Alaska Airlines Arena (7,805); Seattle, WA
12/29/2012*; 4:30 pm, ESPN2		at Connecticut	L 53–61	8–5	XL Center (12,720); Hartford, CT
01/05/2013; 6:30 pm, ESPNU		at Washington State	W 68–63	9–5 (1–0)	Beasley Coliseum (7,711); Pullman, WA
01/09/2013; 8:00 pm, ESPN2		at California	W 62–47	10–5 (2–0)	Haas Pavilion (6,856); Berkeley, CA
01/12/2013; 8:00 pm, FSN		at Stanford	W 65–60	11–5 (3–0)	Maples Pavilion (4,451); Palo Alto, CA
01/16/2013; 8:30 pm, P12N		Colorado	W 64–54	12–5 (4–0)	Alaska Airlines Arena (8,184); Seattle, WA
01/19/2013; 8:00 pm, ESPNU		Utah	L 65–74	12–6 (4–1)	Alaska Airlines Arena (8,598); Seattle, WA
01/23/2013; 8:30 pm, P12N		at Oregon State	L 66–74	12–7 (4–2)	Gill Coliseum (4,213); Corvallis, OR
01/26/2013; 4:00 pm, P12N		at No. 16 Oregon	L 76–81	12–8 (4–3)	Matthew Knight Arena (12,364); Eugene, OR
01/31/2013; 6:00 pm, ESPN		No. 8 Arizona	L 53–57	12–9 (4–4)	Alaska Airlines Arena (8,535); Seattle, WA
02/02/2013; 6:00 pm, ESPNU		Arizona State	W 96–92	13–9 (5–4)	Alaska Airlines Arena (8,417); Seattle, WA
02/07/2013; 6:00 pm, ESPN		at UCLA	L 57–59	13–10 (5–5)	Pauley Pavilion (8,075); Los Angeles, CA
02/10/2013; 7:00 pm, FSN		at USC	L 60–71	13–11 (5–6)	Galen Center (4,214); Los Angeles, CA
02/13/2013; 8:00 pm, ESPN2		No. 23 Oregon	L 52–65	13–12 (5–7)	Alaska Airlines Arena (8,466); Seattle, WA
02/16/2013; 8:00 pm, FSN		Oregon State	W 72–62	14–12 (6–7)	Alaska Airlines Arena (8,454); Seattle, WA
02/20/2013; 8:00 pm, ESPN2		at No. 12 Arizona	L 52–70	14–13 (6–8)	McKale Center (14,545); Tucson, AZ
02/23/2013; 8:00 pm, ESPNU		at Arizona State	W 68–59	15–13 (7–8)	Wells Fargo Arena (10,004); Tempe, AZ
03/03/2013; 12:30 pm, FSN		Washington State	W 72–68	16–13 (8–8)	Alaska Airlines Arena (8,508); Seattle, WA
03/06/2013; 8:30 pm, P12N		USC	W 65–57	17–13 (9–8)	Alaska Airlines Arena (7,753); Seattle, WA
03/09/2013; 11:00 am, CBS		No. 23 UCLA	L 54–61	17–14 (9–9)	Alaska Airlines Arena (8,747); Seattle, WA
2013 Pac-12 men's basketball tournament
03/13/2013; 8:30 pm, P12N		vs. Washington State; First Round	W 64–62	18–14	MGM Grand Garden Arena (8,566); Paradise, NV
03/14/2013; 8:54 pm, ESPNU		vs. Oregon; Quarterfinals	L 77–80 ^{OT}	18–15	MGM Grand Garden Arena (10,566); Paradise, NV
2013 NIT
03/19/2013*; 6:30 pm, ESPN		at BYU; First Round	L 79–90	18–16	Marriott Center (7,511); Provo, UT
*Non-conference game. ^{#}Rankings from AP Poll. (#) Tournament seedings in parentheses. All times are in Pacific Time.
