= 2012–13 Stanford Cardinal men's basketball team =

American college basketball season

2012–13 Stanford Cardinal men's basketball

NIT, Second Round
- Conference: Pac-12 Conference
- Record: 19–15 (9–9 Pac-12)
- Head coach: Johnny Dawkins
- Assistant coaches: Mark Madsen; Charles Payne; Mike Schrage
- Home arena: Maples Pavilion

2012–13 Pac-12 Conference men's basketball standings
	Conf.				Overall
Team	W		L	PCT	W		L	PCT
No. 24 UCLA	13	–	5	.722	25	–	10	.714
No. 25 Oregon †	12	–	6	.667	28	–	9	.757
No. 21 Arizona	12	–	6	.667	27	–	8	.771
California	12	–	6	.667	21	–	12	.636
Colorado	10	–	8	.556	21	–	12	.636
Arizona State	9	–	9	.500	22	–	13	.629
Stanford	9	–	9	.500	19	–	15	.559
Washington	9	–	9	.500	18	–	16	.529
USC	9	–	9	.500	14	–	18	.438
Utah	5	–	13	.278	15	–	18	.455
Oregon State	4	–	14	.222	14	–	18	.438
Washington State	4	–	14	.222	13	–	19	.406
† Conference tournament winner As of March 23, 2013; Rankings from AP Poll

The 2012–13 Stanford Cardinal men's basketball team represented Stanford University during the 2012–13 NCAA Division I men's basketball season. The Cardinal, led by fifth-year head coach Johnny Dawkins, played their home games at Maples Pavilion and were members of the Pac-12 Conference. They finished the season 19–15, 9–9 in Pac-12 play to finish in a four-way tie for sixth place. They lost in the first round of the Pac-12 tournament to Arizona State. They were invited to the 2013 NIT, where they defeated Stephen F. Austin in the first round before losing in the second round to Alabama.

== Previous season ==
The Cardinals won 26 games that season, the most since 2008. In the Pac-12 tournament, they beat Arizona State, then lost to Cal. Although they did not make the NCAA tournament, they were invited to the 2012 National Invitation Tournament, where they advanced to the championship game and defeated the Minnesota Golden Gophers to become the 2012 NIT Champions.

== Offseason ==
=== Departures ===
Name	Number	Pos.	Height	Weight	Year	Hometown	Reason for departure
Jarrett Mann	22	G	6'3"	190	Senior	Middletown, DE	Graduated
Josh Owens	13	F/C	6'8"	230	Senior	Kennesaw, GA	Graduated
Andrew Zimmerman	34	F	6'8"	230	Senior	Oostburg, WI	Graduated
Jack Trotter	50	F/C	6'9"	230	Senior	Moraga, CA	Graduated

== Roster ==
Number	Name	Position	Height	Weight	Year	Hometown
1	Christian Sanders	Guard	6-4	185	Freshman	Houston, Texas
2	Aaron Bright	Guard	5–11	178	Junior	Bellevue, Washington
4	Stefan Nastić	Center	6–11	245	RS sophomore	Thornhill, Ontario, Canada
5	Chasson Randle	Guard	6–1	180	Sophomore	Rock Island, Illinois
10	Robbie Lemons	Guard	6–3	205	Junior	Carmichael, California
11	Andy Brown	Forward	6–7	215	RS senior	Yorba Linda, California
12	Rosco Allen	Forward	6–9	215	Freshman	Las Vegas, Nevada
14	Jack Ryan	Guard/Forward	6–7	210	Sophomore	Glenview, Illinois
20	Wade Morgan	Guard	6-1	168	Sophomore	South Orange, New Jersey
21	Anthony Brown	Guard/Forward	6–6	210	Junior	Huntington Beach, California
23	Gabriel Harris	Guard	6–2	190	Senior	Birmingham, Alabama
24	Josh Huestis	Forward	6–7	230	Junior	Great Falls, Montana
30	Grant Verhoeven	Center	6–9	220	Freshman	Visalia, California
33	Dwight Powell	Forward	6–10	235	Junior	Toronto, Ontario, Canada
40	John Gage	Forward/Center	6–10	235	Junior	Vashon Island, Washington
51	Elliott Bullock	Forward/Center	6-11	245	Junior	Salt Lake City, Utah

== Schedule ==
Date time, TV	Rank^{#}	Opponent^{#}	Result	Record	Site (attendance) city, state
Exhibition
11/04/2012*; 1:00 pm		UNC Pembroke	W 85–71	–	Maples Pavilion (3,977); Stanford, CA
Regular season
11/09/2012*; 8:00 pm, P12N		vs. San Francisco	W 74–62	1–0	Oracle Arena (3,200); Oakland, CA
11/12/2012*; 8:30 pm, P12N		Cal State Fullerton	W 81–68	2–0	Maples Pavilion (4,161); Stanford, CA
11/15/2012*; 6:00 pm, P12N		Alcorn State	W 69–51	3–0	Maples Pavilion (4,028); Stanford, CA
11/18/2012*; 6:00 pm, P12N		Belmont	L 62–70	3–1	Maples Pavilion (4,365); Stanford, CA
11/22/2012*; 10:00 am, AXS TV		vs. No. 13 Missouri; Battle 4 Atlantis Quarterfinals	L 70–78	3–2	Imperial Arena (3,217); Nassau, BAH
11/23/2012*; 12:30 pm, AXS TV		vs. Northern Iowa; Battle 4 Atlantis Consolation round	W 66–50	4–2	Imperial Arena (1,462); Nassau, BAH
11/24/2012*; 12:30 pm, AXS TV		vs. Minnesota; Battle 4 Atlantis 5th place game	L 63–66	4–3	Imperial Arena (1,845); Nassau, BAH
11/28/2012*; 7:00 pm, P12N		Seattle	W 68–57	5–3	Maples Pavilion (4,381); Stanford, CA
12/02/2012*; 2:00 pm, P12N		Denver	W 71–58	6–3	Maples Pavilion (4,340); Stanford, CA
12/15/2012*; 2:00 pm, P12N		UC Davis	W 75–52	7–3	Maples Pavilion (4,627); Stanford, CA
12/18/2012*; 6:00 pm, ESPN2		at No. 25 NC State	L 79–88	7–4	PNC Arena (15,772); Raleigh, NC
12/21/2012*; 6:00 pm, BTN		at Northwestern	W 70–68	8–4	Welsh-Ryan Arena (6,718); Evanston, IL
12/29/2012*; 7:30 pm, P12N		Lafayette	W 65–59	9–4	Maples Pavilion (4,941); Stanford, CA
01/03/2013; 7:00 pm, ESPNU		at USC	L 69–71	9–5 (0–1)	Galen Center (3,026); Los Angeles, CA
01/05/2013; 12:00 pm, P12N		at UCLA	L 60–68	9–6 (0–2)	Pauley Pavilion (10,266); Los Angeles, CA
01/09/2013; 7:00 pm, P12N		Washington State	W 78–67	10–6 (1–2)	Maples Pavilion (4,476); Stanford, CA
01/12/2013; 8:00 pm, FSN		Washington	L 60–65	10–7 (1–3)	Maples Pavilion (4,451); Stanford, CA
01/19/2013; 1:30 pm, FSN		California	W 69–59	11–7 (2–3)	Maples Pavilion (5,877); Stanford, CA
01/24/2013; 7:00 pm, ESPNU		at Colorado	L 54–75	11–8 (2–4)	Coors Events Center (11,212); Boulder, CO
01/27/2013; 6:00 pm, P12N		at Utah	W 87–56	12–8 (3–4)	Jon M. Huntsman Center (7,769); Salt Lake City, UT
01/30/2013; 8:00 pm, ESPNU		No. 10 Oregon	W 76–52	13–8 (4–4)	Maples Pavilion (4,816); Stanford, CA
02/03/2013; 12:00 pm, P12N		Oregon State	W 81–73	14–8 (5–4)	Maples Pavilion (4,733); Stanford, CA
02/06/2013; 6:00 pm, ESPNews		at No. 7 Arizona	L 66–73	14–9 (5–5)	McKale Center (14,545); Tucson, AZ
02/09/2013; 4:00 pm, ESPNU		at Arizona State	W 62–59	15–9 (6–5)	Wells Fargo Arena (8,459); Tempe, AZ
02/14/2013; 8:00 pm, ESPNU		USC	L 64–65	15–10 (6–6)	Maples Pavilion (4,367); Stanford, CA
02/16/2013; 1:00 pm, ESPN2		UCLA	L 80–88	15–11 (6–7)	Maples Pavilion (6,562); Stanford, CA
02/21/2013; 8:00 pm, ESPNU		at Oregon State	W 82–72	16–11 (7–7)	Gill Coliseum (4,649); Corvallis, OR
02/23/2013; 5:00 pm, P12N		at No. 23 Oregon	L 66–77	16–12 (7–8)	Matthew Knight Arena (12,364); Eugene, OR
02/27/2013; 8:00 pm, ESPN2		Colorado	L 63–65	16–13 (7–9)	Maples Pavilion (4,395); Stanford, CA
03/03/2013; 2:00 pm, P12N		Utah	W 84–66	17–13 (8–9)	Maples Pavilion (5,433); Stanford, CA
03/06/2013; 8:00 pm, ESPN2		at California	W 83–70	18–13 (9–9)	Haas Pavilion (11,877); Berkeley, CA
2013 Pac-12 tournament
03/13/2013; 12:00 pm, P12N		vs. Arizona State; First Round	L 88–89 ^{OT}	18–14	MGM Grand Garden Arena (7,451); Paradise, NV
2013 NIT
03/19/2013*; 8:00 pm, ESPN2	No. (4)	(5) Stephen F. Austin; First Round	W 58–57	19–14	Maples Pavilion (1,050); Stanford, CA
03/23/2013*; 9:00 am, ESPN	No. (4)	(1) Alabama; Second Round	L 54–66	19–15	Coleman Coliseum (6,148); Tuscaloosa, AL
*Non-conference game. ^{#}Rankings from AP Poll. (#) Tournament seedings in parentheses. All times are in Pacific Time. (#) during NIT is seed within region.
