= 2012–13 Oregon State Beavers men's basketball team =

American college basketball season

2012–13 Oregon State Beavers men's basketball
- Conference: Pac-12 Conference
- Record: 14–18 (4–14 Pac-12)
- Head coach: Craig Robinson
- Assistant coaches: Doug Stewart; Nate Pomeday; David Grace
- Home arena: Gill Coliseum

2012–13 Pac-12 Conference men's basketball standings
	Conf.				Overall
Team	W		L	PCT	W		L	PCT
No. 24 UCLA	13	–	5	.722	25	–	10	.714
No. 25 Oregon †	12	–	6	.667	28	–	9	.757
No. 21 Arizona	12	–	6	.667	27	–	8	.771
California	12	–	6	.667	21	–	12	.636
Colorado	10	–	8	.556	21	–	12	.636
Arizona State	9	–	9	.500	22	–	13	.629
Stanford	9	–	9	.500	19	–	15	.559
Washington	9	–	9	.500	18	–	16	.529
USC	9	–	9	.500	14	–	18	.438
Utah	5	–	13	.278	15	–	18	.455
Oregon State	4	–	14	.222	14	–	18	.438
Washington State	4	–	14	.222	13	–	19	.406
† Conference tournament winner As of March 23, 2013; Rankings from AP Poll

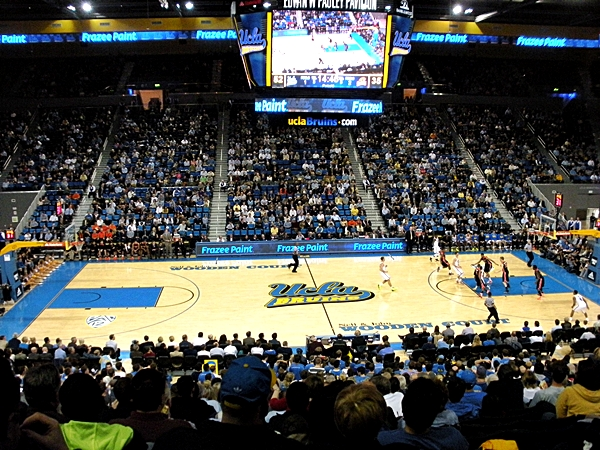
UCLA Bruins vs. Oregon State Beavers, January 2013

The 2012–13 Oregon State Beavers men's basketball team represented Oregon State University in the 2012–13 NCAA Division I men's basketball season. Head coach Craig Robinson was in his fifth year with the team. The Beavers played their home games at Gill Coliseum in Corvallis, Oregon and were a member of the Pac-12 Conference. They finished with a record of 14–18 overall, 4–14 in Pac-12 to finish in a last place tie with Washington State. They lost in the first round of the Pac-12 tournament to Colorado.

== 2012 recruiting class ==
College recruiting
Name	Hometown	School	Height	Weight	Commit date
Jarmal Reid; SF	Decatur, GA	Columbia High School	6 ft 7 in (2.01 m)	230 lb (100 kg)	Sep 3, 2011
Jarmal Reid; SF	Recruit ratings: Scout: Rivals: (89)				
Victor Robbins; SF	Compton, CA	Compton High School	6 ft 6 in (1.98 m)	195 lb (88 kg)	May 11, 2012
Victor Robbins; SF	Recruit ratings: Scout: Rivals: (89)				
Langston Morris-Walker; SF	Berkeley, CA	Berkeley High School	6 ft 5 in (1.96 m)	210 lb (95 kg)	Sep 12, 2011
Langston Morris-Walker; SF	Recruit ratings: Scout: Rivals: (86)				
Overall recruit ranking: Scout: – Rivals: –
Note: In many cases, Scout, Rivals, 247Sports, On3, and ESPN may conflict in their listings of height and weight.; In these cases, the average was taken. ESPN grades are on a 100-point scale.; Sources: "Oregon State Commit List for 2012". Rivals.; "Men's Basketball Recruiting". Scout.; "ESPN – Oregon State Beavers Basketball Recruiting 2012". ESPN.; "Scout.com Team Recruiting Rankings". Scout.; "2012 Team Ranking". Rivals.

== Roster ==
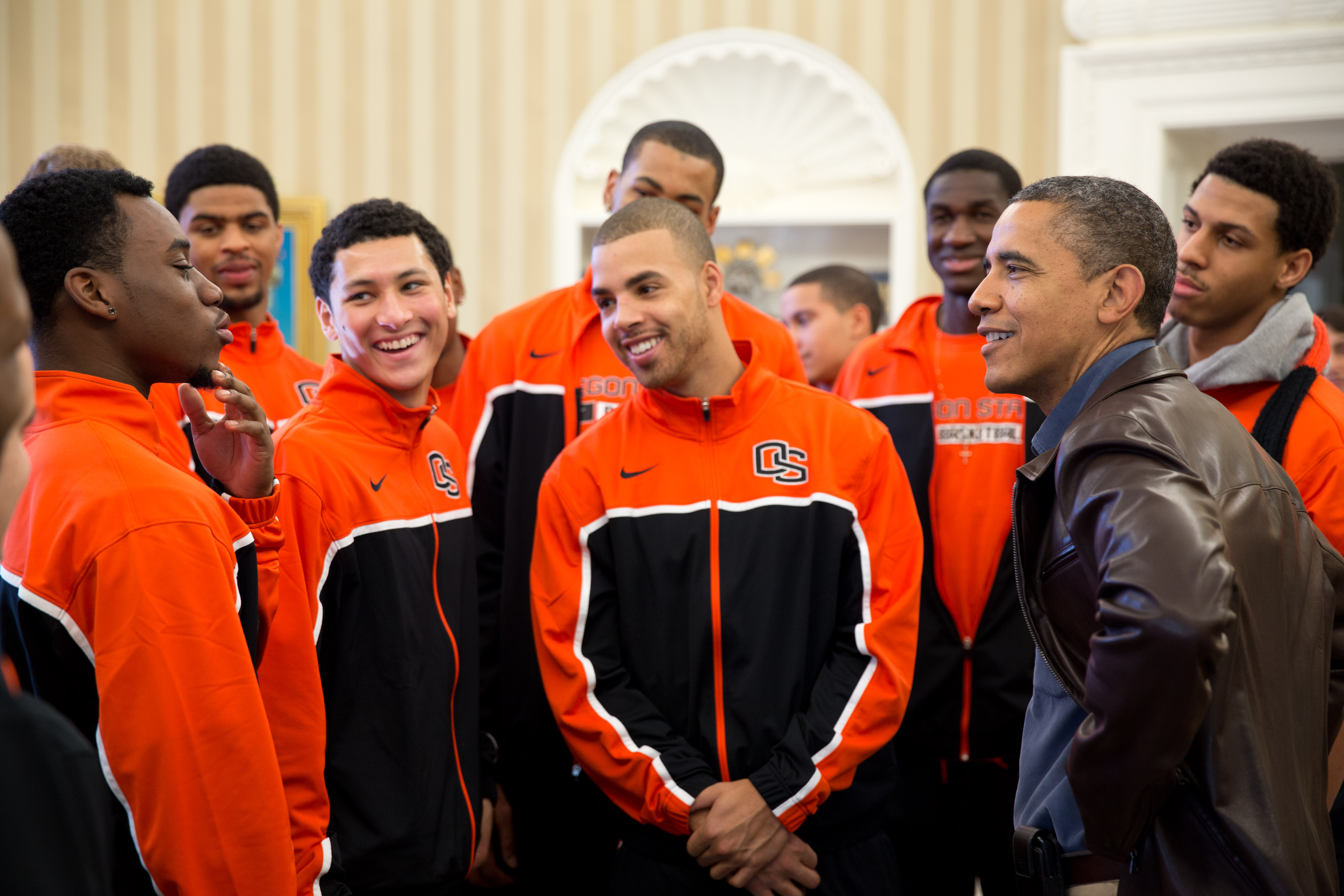
Barack Obama with the 2012–13 Oregon State University basketball team

2012–13 Oregon State Beavers men's basketball team
Players
Coaches

Pos.	#	Name	Height	Weight	Year	Hometown
G/F	1	Victor Robbins	6 ft 6 in (1.98 m)	195 lb (88 kg)	Fr	Compton, California
G	2	Michael Moyer	6 ft 2 in (1.88 m)	205 lb (93 kg)	RS Jr	Turner, Oregon
G	3	Ahmad Starks	5 ft 9 in (1.75 m)	165 lb (75 kg)	Jr	Chicago, Illinois
G	4	Challe Barton	6 ft 3 in (1.91 m)	193 lb (88 kg)	So	Gothenburg, SWE
C	10	Daniel Jones	6 ft 11 in (2.11 m)	230 lb (104 kg)	Jr	Orland, California
F/C	11	Joe Burton	6 ft 7 in (2.01 m)	295 lb (134 kg)	Sr	Soboba, California
C	12	Angus Brandt	6 ft 10 in (2.08 m)	242 lb (110 kg)	Sr	Sydney, Australia
G	13	Langston Morris-Walker	6 ft 5 in (1.96 m)	215 lb (98 kg)	Fr	Berkeley, California
F	14	Daniel Gomis	6 ft 10 in (2.08 m)	225 lb (102 kg)	RS Fr	Thiès, SEG
F	15	Eric Moreland	6 ft 10 in (2.08 m)	215 lb (98 kg)	RS So	Missouri City, Texas
G	24	C.J. Mitchell	6 ft 1 in (1.85 m)	179 lb (81 kg)	Jr	Portland, Oregon
G	31	Jullian Powers	6 ft 2 in (1.88 m)	193 lb (88 kg)	Jr	Arlington, Texas
F	32	Jarmal Reid	6 ft 7 in (2.01 m)	225 lb (102 kg)	Fr	Decatur, Georgia
F	44	Devon Collier	6 ft 8 in (2.03 m)	215 lb (98 kg)	Jr	Bronx, New York
G	55	Roberto Nelson	6 ft 3 in (1.91 m)	195 lb (88 kg)	Jr	Santa Barbara, California

Head coach

- Craig Robinson (Princeton)

Assistant coach(es)

- Doug Stewart (Brown)
- Nate Pomeday (Northwestern)
- David Grace (Park)

Legend

- (C) Team captain
- (S) Suspended
- (I) Ineligible
- (W) Walk-on
- Injured
- Current redshirt

Roster
Last update: 2012-8-12

== Schedule ==
Date time, TV	Rank^{#}	Opponent^{#}	Result	Record	Site (attendance) city, state
Exhibition
11/04/2012*; 7:30 pm		Lewis & Clark	W 83–58	–	Gill Coliseum (2,037); Corvallis, OR
Regular season
11/09/2012*; 6:00 pm, P12N		Niagara; 2K Sports Classic	W 102–83	1–0	Gill Coliseum (3,206); Corvallis, OR
11/11/2012*; 6:30 pm, ESPNU		New Mexico State; 2K Sports Classic	W 71–62	2–0	Gill Coliseum (3,368); Corvallis, OR
11/15/2012*; 4:00 pm, ESPN2		vs. Alabama; 2K Sports Classic Semifinals	L 62–65	2–1	Madison Square Garden (6,149); New York City, NY
11/16/2012*; 2:00 pm, ESPNU		vs. Purdue; 2K Sports Classic 3rd place game	W 66–58	3–1	Madison Square Garden (6,177); New York City, NY
11/25/2012*; 3:00 pm, P12N		Montana State	W 78–65	4–1	Gill Coliseum (5,224); Corvallis, OR
11/30/2012*; 5:00 pm, Jayhawk TV		vs. No. 10 Kansas	L 78–84	4–2	Sprint Center (18,789); Kansas City, MO
12/08/2012*; 1:00 pm, P12N		Grambling State	W 85–54	5–2	Gill Coliseum (3,291); Corvallis, OR
12/12/2012*; 7:35 pm, CSNNW		at Portland State	W 79–74	6–2	Stott Center (1,500); Portland, OR
12/16/2012*; 4:00 pm, P12N		Chicago State	W 87–77	7–2	Gill Coliseum (4,183); Corvallis, OR
12/19/2012*; 7:00 pm, P12N		Howard	W 69–53	8–2	Gill Coliseum (3,879); Corvallis, OR
12/22/2012*; 6:00 pm, P12N		vs. San Diego; Las Vegas Classic	W 86–79	9–2	MGM Grand Garden Arena (840); Paradise, NV
12/29/2012*; 1:00 pm, P12N		Towson	L 66–67 ^{OT}	9–3	Gill Coliseum (3,847); Corvallis, OR
12/31/2012*; 2:00 pm, P12N		Texas–Pan American	W 84–59	10–3	Gill Coliseum (3,276); Corvallis, OR
01/06/2013; 7:00 pm, FSN		Oregon; Civil War	L 66–79	10–4 (0–1)	Gill Coliseum (8,612); Corvallis, OR
01/10/2013; 8:30 pm, P12N		Arizona State	L 62–72	10–5 (0–2)	Gill Coliseum (4,796); Corvallis, OR
01/12/2013; 5:00 pm, ESPNU		No. 4 Arizona	L 70–80	10–6 (0–3)	Gill Coliseum (7,224); Corvallis, OR
01/17/2013; 6:00 pm, ESPNU		at No. 24 UCLA	L 64–74	10–7 (0–4)	Pauley Pavilion (8,721); Los Angeles, CA
01/19/2013; 5:00 pm, P12N		at USC	L 68–69	10–8 (0–5)	Galen Center (3,963); Los Angeles, CA
01/23/2013; 8:30 pm, P12N		Washington	W 74–66	11–8 (1–5)	Gill Coliseum (4,213); Corvallis, OR
01/26/2013; 2:00 pm, P12N		Washington State	L 68–71	11–9 (1–6)	Gill Coliseum (6,592); Corvallis, OR
01/31/2013; 7:00 pm, ESPNU		at California	L 68–71	11–10 (1–7)	Haas Pavilion (8,261); Berkeley, CA
02/03/2013; 12:00 pm, P12N		at Stanford	L 73–81	11–11 (1–8)	Maples Pavilion (4,733); Stanford, CA
02/06/2013; 7:00 pm, P12N		Utah	W 82–64	12–11 (2–8)	Gill Coliseum (4,118); Corvallis, OR
02/10/2013; 6:00 pm, P12N		Colorado	L 68–72	12–12 (2–9)	Gill Coliseum (4,819); Corvallis, OR
02/13/2013; 7:00 pm, P12N		at Washington State	W 67–66	13–12 (3–9)	Beasley Coliseum (4,167); Pullman, WA
02/16/2013; 8:00 pm, FSN		at Washington	L 62–72	13–13 (3–10)	Alaska Airlines Arena (8,454); Seattle, WA
02/21/2013; 8:00 pm, ESPNU		Stanford	L 72–82	13–14 (3–11)	Gill Coliseum (4,649); Corvallis, OR
02/23/2013; 3:00 pm, P12N		California	L 59–60	13–15 (3–12)	Gill Coliseum (6,034); Corvallis, OR
02/28/2013; 8:00 pm, ESPNU		at No. 24 Oregon; Civil War	L 75–85	13–16 (3–13)	Matthew Knight Arena (10,621); Eugene, OR
03/07/2013; 6:00 pm, ESPNU		at Utah	L 61–72	13–17 (3–14)	Jon M. Huntsman Center (8,019); Salt Lake City, UT
03/09/2013; 1:30 pm, P12N		at Colorado	W 64–58	14–17 (4–14)	Coors Events Center (10,105); Boulder, CO
Pac-12 tournament
03/13/2013; 2:50 pm, P12N		vs. Colorado; First Round	L 68–74	14–18	MGM Grand Garden Arena (7,451); Paradise, NV
*Non-conference game. ^{#}Rankings from AP Poll. (#) Tournament seedings in parentheses. All times are in Pacific Time.
