= 2012–13 Colorado Buffaloes men's basketball team =

American college basketball season

2012–13 Colorado Buffaloes men's basketball

Charleston Classic Champions

NCAA tournament, Round of 64
- Conference: Pac-12 Conference
- Record: 21–12 (10–8 Pac–12)
- Head coach: Tad Boyle
- Assistant coaches: Tom Abatemarco; Jean Prioleau; Mike Rohn
- Home arena: Coors Events Center

2012–13 Pac-12 Conference men's basketball standings
	Conf.				Overall
Team	W		L	PCT	W		L	PCT
No. 24 UCLA	13	–	5	.722	25	–	10	.714
No. 25 Oregon †	12	–	6	.667	28	–	9	.757
No. 21 Arizona	12	–	6	.667	27	–	8	.771
California	12	–	6	.667	21	–	12	.636
Colorado	10	–	8	.556	21	–	12	.636
Arizona State	9	–	9	.500	22	–	13	.629
Stanford	9	–	9	.500	19	–	15	.559
Washington	9	–	9	.500	18	–	16	.529
USC	9	–	9	.500	14	–	18	.438
Utah	5	–	13	.278	15	–	18	.455
Oregon State	4	–	14	.222	14	–	18	.438
Washington State	4	–	14	.222	13	–	19	.406
† Conference tournament winner As of March 23, 2013; Rankings from AP Poll

The 2012–13 Colorado Buffaloes men's basketball team represented the University of Colorado in the 2012–13 NCAA Division I men's basketball season. Head coach Tad Boyle was in his third season at Colorado. They were members of the Pac-12 Conference and played their home games at the Coors Events Center. They finished the season 21–12, 10–8 in Pac-12 play to finish in fifth place. They lost in the quarterfinals of the Pac-12 tournament to Arizona. They received an at-large bid to the 2013 NCAA tournament where they lost in the second round to Illinois.

== Roster ==
2012–13 Colorado Buffaloes men's basketball team
Players
Coaches

Pos.	#	Name	Height	Weight	Year	Hometown
G	0	Askia Booker	6 ft 1 in (1.85 m)	170 lb (77 kg)	So	Los Angeles, California
F	1	Wesley Gordon (redshirt)	6 ft 8 in (2.03 m)	225 lb (102 kg)	Fr	Colorado Springs, Colorado
F	2	Xavier Johnson	6 ft 6 in (1.98 m)	220 lb (100 kg)	Fr	Santa Ana, California
G	3	Xavier Talton	6 ft 1 in (1.85 m)	180 lb (82 kg)	Fr	Sterling, Colorado
G	5	Eli Stalzer	6 ft 3 in (1.91 m)	185 lb (84 kg)	Fr	Santa Ana, California
F	11	Chris Jenkins (redshirt)	6 ft 7 in (2.01 m)	180 lb (82 kg)	Fr	Detroit, Michigan
G	13	Kevin Nelson (injured)	6 ft 2 in (1.88 m)	175 lb (79 kg)	Jr	Albuquerque, New Mexico
G	14	Beau Gamble	6 ft 0 in (1.83 m)	180 lb (82 kg)	RS So	Boulder, Colorado
C	15	Shane Harris-Tunks	6 ft 11 in (2.11 m)	250 lb (113 kg)	RS Jr	Liverpool, NSW, Australia
F	21	André Roberson	6 ft 7 in (2.01 m)	210 lb (95 kg)	Jr	San Antonio, Texas
G	23	Sabatino Chen	6 ft 4 in (1.93 m)	190 lb (86 kg)	Sr	Louisville, Colorado
G	25	Spencer Dinwiddie	6 ft 5 in (1.96 m)	190 lb (86 kg)	So	Woodland Hills, California
G	31	Jeremy Adams	6 ft 5 in (1.96 m)	220 lb (100 kg)	RS Jr	Madison, Mississippi
C	32	Ben Mills	7 ft 0 in (2.13 m)	225 lb (102 kg)	Jr	Hartland, Wisconsin
F	40	Josh Scott	6 ft 10 in (2.08 m)	215 lb (98 kg)	Fr	Monument, Colorado

Head coach

- Tad Boyle (Kansas)

Assistant coach(es)

- Rodney Billups (Denver)
- Jean Prioleau (Fordham)
- Mike Rohn (McPherson)

Legend

- (C) Team captain
- (S) Suspended
- (I) Ineligible
- (W) Walk-on
- Injured
- Current redshirt

== Schedule and results ==
Date time, TV	Rank^{#}	Opponent^{#}	Result	Record	Site (attendance) city, state
Regular season
11/09/2012*; 5:00 pm, P12N		Wofford	W 74–59	1–0	Coors Events Center (10,611); Boulder, CO
11/15/2012*; 10:30 am, ESPN3		vs. Dayton; Charleston Classic Quarterfinal	W 67–57	2–0	TD Arena (1,381); Charleston, SC
11/16/2012*; 10:30 am, ESPNU		vs. No. 16 Baylor; Charleston Classic Semifinal	W 60–58	3–0	TD Arena (3,177); Charleston, SC
11/18/2012*; 6:30 pm, ESPN2		vs. Murray State; Charleston Classic Championship	W 81–74	4–0	TD Arena (3,291); Charleston, SC
11/25/2012*; 6:00 pm, P12N	No. 23	Air Force	W 89–74	5–0	Coors Events Center (10,607); Boulder, CO
11/27/2012*; 7:30 pm, P12N	No. 19	Texas Southern	W 85–80 ^{2OT}	6–0	Coors Events Center (8,325); Boulder, CO
12/01/2012*; 8:00 pm, RTRM	No. 19	at Wyoming	L 69–76	6–1	Arena-Auditorium (8,240); Laramie, WY
12/05/2012*; 8:30 pm, P12N		Colorado State	W 70–61	7–1	Coors Events Center (11,708); Boulder, CO
12/08/2012*; 12:00 pm, ESPN2		at No. 9 Kansas	L 54–90	7–2	Allen Fieldhouse (16,300); Lawrence, KS
12/12/2012*; 8:00 pm		at Fresno State	W 50–43	8–2	Save Mart Center (6,599); Fresno, CA
12/21/2012*; 6:30 pm, P12N		Northern Arizona	W 98–51	9–2	Coors Events Center (10,034); Boulder, CO
12/29/2012*; 12:00 pm, P12N		Hartford	W 80–52	10–2	Coors Events Center (10,228); Boulder, CO
01/03/2013; 6:00 pm, ESPNU		at No. 3 Arizona	L 83–92 ^{OT}	10–3 (0–1)	McKale Center (14,545); Tucson, AZ
01/06/2013; 6:00 pm, P12N		at Arizona State	L 56–65	10–4 (0–2)	Wells Fargo Arena (6,298); Tempe, AZ
01/10/2013; 8:00 pm, ESPNU		USC	W 66–60	11–4 (1–2)	Coors Events Center (10,344); Boulder, CO
01/12/2013; 12:00 pm, P12N		UCLA	L 75–78	11–5 (1–3)	Coors Events Center (9,696); Boulder, CO
01/16/2013; 9:30 pm, P12N		at Washington	L 54–64	11–6 (1–4)	Alaska Airlines Arena (8,184); Seattle, WA
01/19/2013; 8:00 pm, P12N		at Washington State	W 58–49	12–6 (2–4)	Beasley Coliseum (5,418); Pullman, WA
01/24/2013; 8:00 pm, ESPNU		Stanford	W 75–54	13–6 (3–4)	Coors Events Center (11,212); Boulder, CO
01/27/2013; 1:30 pm, FSN		California	W 81–71	14–6 (4–4)	Coors Events Center (10,132); Boulder, CO
02/02/2013; 12:30 pm, FSN		at Utah	L 55–58	14–7 (4–5)	Jon M. Huntsman Center (10,977); Salt Lake City, UT
02/07/2013; 8:00 pm, ESPNU		at No. 19 Oregon	W 48–47	15–7 (5–5)	Matthew Knight Arena (8,862); Eugene, OR
02/10/2013; 7:00 pm, P12N		at Oregon State	W 72–68	16–7 (6–5)	Gill Coliseum (4,819); Corvallis, OR
02/14/2013; 8:00 pm, P12N		No. 9 Arizona	W 71–58	17–7 (7–5)	Coors Events Center (11,120); Boulder, CO
02/16/2013; 7:00 pm, ESPNU		Arizona State	L 62–63 ^{OT}	17–8 (7–6)	Coors Events Center (10,926); Boulder, CO
02/21/2013; 8:00 pm, P12N		Utah	W 60–50	18–8 (8–6)	Coors Events Center (9,823); Boulder, CO
02/27/2013; 9:00 pm, ESPN2		at Stanford	W 65–63	19–8 (9–6)	Maples Pavilion (4,395); Stanford, CA
03/02/2013; 3:00 pm, ESPNU		at California	L 46–62	19–9 (9–7)	Haas Pavilion (10,679); Berkeley, CA
03/07/2013; 7:00 pm, ESPN2		No. 19 Oregon	W 76–53	20–9 (10–7)	Coors Events Center (11,013); Boulder, CO
03/09/2013; 2:30 pm, P12N		Oregon State	L 58–64	20–10 (10–8)	Coors Events Center (10,105); Boulder, CO
2013 Pac-12 men's basketball tournament
03/13/2013; 3:50 pm, P12N		vs. Oregon State; First Round	W 74–68	21–10	MGM Grand Garden Arena (7,451); Paradise, NV
03/14/2013; 3:42 pm, P12N		vs. No. 18 Arizona; Quarterfinals	L 69–79	21–11	MGM Grand Garden Arena (12,915); Paradise, NV
2013 NCAA tournament
03/22/2013*; 2:44 pm, TNT	No. (10 E)	vs. (7 E) Illinois; Second Round	L 49–57	21–12	Frank Erwin Center (13,784); Austin, TX
*Non-conference game. ^{#}Rankings from AP Poll. (#) Tournament seedings in parentheses. All times are in Mountain Time. (#) during NCAA Tournament is Seed with Region E=East.
