= 2012–13 Arizona State Sun Devils men's basketball team =

American college basketball season

2012–13 Arizona State Sun Devils men's basketball

NIT, Second Round
- Conference: Pac-12 Conference
- Record: 22–13 (9–9 Pac-12)
- Head coach: Herb Sendek (7th season)
- Assistant coaches: Dedrique Taylor; Eric Musselman; Larry Greer
- Home arena: Wells Fargo Arena

2012–13 Pac-12 Conference men's basketball standings
| | Conf. | | | | Overall |
| Team | W | | L | PCT | W | | L | PCT |
|---|---|---|---|---|---|---|---|---|
| No. 24 UCLA | 13 | – | 5 | .722 | 25 | – | 10 | .714 |
| No. 25 Oregon † | 12 | – | 6 | .667 | 28 | – | 9 | .757 |
| No. 21 Arizona | 12 | – | 6 | .667 | 27 | – | 8 | .771 |
| California | 12 | – | 6 | .667 | 21 | – | 12 | .636 |
| Colorado | 10 | – | 8 | .556 | 21 | – | 12 | .636 |
| Arizona State | 9 | – | 9 | .500 | 22 | – | 13 | .629 |
| Stanford | 9 | – | 9 | .500 | 19 | – | 15 | .559 |
| Washington | 9 | – | 9 | .500 | 18 | – | 16 | .529 |
| USC | 9 | – | 9 | .500 | 14 | – | 18 | .438 |
| Utah | 5 | – | 13 | .278 | 15 | – | 18 | .455 |
| Oregon State | 4 | – | 14 | .222 | 14 | – | 18 | .438 |
| Washington State | 4 | – | 14 | .222 | 13 | – | 19 | .406 |
† Conference tournament winner As of March 23, 2013; Rankings from AP Poll

The 2012–13 Arizona State Sun Devils men's basketball team represented Arizona State University during the 2012–13 NCAA Division I men's basketball season. The Sun Devils, led by seventh-year head coach Herb Sendek, played their home games at the Wells Fargo Arena and were members of the Pac-12 Conference. They finished the season 22–13, 9–9 in Pac-12 play to finish in a four way tie for sixth place. They lost in the quarterfinals of the Pac-12 tournament to UCLA. They were invited to the 2013 NIT where they defeated Detroit in the first round before losing in the second round to Baylor.

== Departures ==
| Name | Number | Pos. | Height | Weight | Year | Hometown | Notes |
|---|---|---|---|---|---|---|---|
| Trent Lockett | 24 | G | 6'4" | 210 | Junior | Golden Valley, Minnesota | Transferred to be closer to family. |
| Kyle Cain | 5 | F | 6'7" | 210 | Sophomore | Chicago, Illinois | Dismissed from team. |
| Keala King | 21 | G | 6'4" | 201 | Sophomore | Compton, California | Dismissed from team. |
| Chanse Creekmur | 15 | G | 6'5" | 216 | Senior | Marshalltown, Iowa | Transferred to pursue football. |

== Recruits ==
College recruiting information
| Name | Hometown | School | Height | Weight | Commit date |
|---|---|---|---|---|---|
| Eric Jacobsen; C/F | Chandler, Arizona | Hamilton High School | 6 ft 10 in (2.08 m) | 235 lb (107 kg) | May 5, 2011 |
| Eric Jacobsen; C/F | Recruit ratings: Scout: Rivals: (88) | | | | |
| Kenny Martin; PF | Glendale, Arizona | Raymond S. Kellis High School | 6 ft 8 in (2.03 m) | 210 lb (95 kg) | Jul 18, 2011 |
| Kenny Martin; PF | Recruit ratings: Scout: Rivals: (91) | | | | |
| Calaen Robinson; PG | Chandler, Arizona | Corona Del Sol High School | 6 ft 2 in (1.88 m) | 170 lb (77 kg) | Aug 3, 2011 |
| Calaen Robinson; PG | Recruit ratings: Scout: Rivals: (90) | | | | |
Overall recruit ranking:
Note: In many cases, Scout, Rivals, 247Sports, On3, and ESPN may conflict in their listings of height and weight.; In these cases, the average was taken. ESPN grades are on a 100-point scale.; Sources: "2012 Arizona State Basketball Commits". Rivals.; "2012 Arizona State Basketball Commits". Scout.; "ESPN". ESPN.; "Scout.com Team Recruiting Rankings". Scout.; "2012 Team Ranking". Rivals.

== Roster ==
2012–13 Arizona State Sun Devils men's basketball team
Players
Coaches

| Pos. | # | Name | Height | Weight | Year | Previous school | Hometown |
|---|---|---|---|---|---|---|---|
| G/F | 0 | Carrick Felix | 6 ft 6 in (1.98 m) | 197 lb (89 kg) | Sr | College of Southern Idaho | Goodyear, Arizona |
| G | 1 | Jahii Carson | 5 ft 10 in (1.78 m) | 175 lb (79 kg) | RS Fr | Mesa High School | Mesa, Arizona |
| G | 2 | Chris Colvin | 6 ft 2 in (1.88 m) | 185 lb (84 kg) | Sr | Palm Beach Community College | Chicago, Illinois |
| F/C | 3 | Eric Jacobsen | 6 ft 10 in (2.08 m) | 245 lb (111 kg) | Fr | Hamilton High School | Chandler, Arizona |
| G | 4 | Bo Barnes | 6 ft 4 in (1.93 m) | 195 lb (88 kg) | RS So | University of Hawaii | Scottsdale, Arizona |
| F | 5 | Richie Edwards (redshirt) | 6 ft 7 in (2.01 m) | 225 lb (102 kg) | Sr | Valparaiso University | Lakeland, Florida |
| G | 10 | Evan Gordon | 6 ft 1 in (1.85 m) | 187 lb (85 kg) | RS Jr | Liberty University | Indianapolis, Indiana |
| G | 12 | Joey Hormes | 6 ft 0 in (1.83 m) | 190 lb (86 kg) | Sr | Glendale Community College | Phoenix, Arizona |
| C | 13 | Jordan Bachynski | 7 ft 2 in (2.18 m) | 250 lb (113 kg) | Jr | Centennial High School | Calgary, Alberta |
| G | 22 | Jarrett Upchurch | 6 ft 1 in (1.85 m) | 192 lb (87 kg) | Jr | Eastern Wyoming College | Scottsdale, Arizona |
| C | 23 | Ruslan Pateev | 7 ft 0 in (2.13 m) | 255 lb (116 kg) | Sr | Montverde Academy | Moscow, Russia |
| F | 31 | Jonathan Gilling | 6 ft 7 in (2.01 m) | 215 lb (98 kg) | So | Hørsholm | Rungsted Kyst, Denmark |
| G | 33 | Dave Whitmore | 6 ft 6 in (1.98 m) | 206 lb (93 kg) | Jr | Corona Del Sol High School | Tempe, Arizona |
| F | 41 | Kenny Martin | 6 ft 8 in (2.03 m) | 220 lb (100 kg) | Fr | Raymond S. Kellis High School | Glendale, Arizona |

Head coach

- Herb Sendek (Carnegie Mellon)

Assistant coach(es)

- Dedrique Taylor (UC Davis)
- Eric Musselman (San Diego)
- Larry Greer (Northeastern)

Legend

- (C) Team captain
- (S) Suspended
- (I) Ineligible
- (W) Walk-on
- Injured
- Current redshirt

Roster

=== Depth chart ===
| Pos. | Starting 5 | Bench 1 | Bench 2 | Bench 3 |
|---|---|---|---|---|
| C | Jordan Bachynski | Ruslan Pateev |
| PF | Jonathan Gilling | Eric Jacobsen |
| SF | Carrick Felix | Kenny Martin | Dave Whitmore |
| SG | Evan Gordon | Bo Barnes | Jarrett Upchurch | Richie Edwards |
| PG | Jahii Carson | Chris Colvin | | Joseph Hormes |

== Schedule ==
| Date time, TV | Rank^{#} | Opponent^{#} | Result | Record | Site (attendance) city, state |
Regular season
| 11/10/2012*; 5:30 pm, P12N | | Central Arkansas | W 79–64 | 1–0 | Wells Fargo Arena (4,286); Tempe, AZ |
| 11/18/2012*; 5:00 pm, P12N | | Florida A&M; Las Vegas Invitational | W 97–70 | 2–0 | Wells Fargo Arena (3,107); Tempe, AZ |
| 11/20/2012*; 7:00 pm, P12N | | Cornell; Las Vegas Invitational | W 64–53 | 3–0 | Wells Fargo Arena (4,595); Tempe, AZ |
| 11/23/2012*; 5:00 pm, ESPN3 | | vs. Arkansas; Las Vegas Invitational semifinals | W 83–68 | 4–0 | Orleans Arena (N/A); Paradise, NV |
| 11/24/2012*; 9:00 pm, ESPNU | | vs. No. 14 Creighton; Las Vegas Invitational Championship | L 73–87 | 4–1 | Orleans Arena (N/A); Paradise, NV |
| 11/28/2012*; 6:00 pm, P12N | | Arkansas-Pine Bluff | W 69–54 | 5–1 | Wells Fargo Arena (4,545); Tempe, AZ |
| 12/01/2012*; 4:00 pm, P12N | | Sacramento State | W 90–70 | 6–1 | Wells Fargo Arena (5,007); Tempe, AZ |
| 12/05/2012*; 6:30 pm, P12N | | Hartford | W 71–63 | 7–1 | Wells Fargo Arena (4,487); Tempe, AZ |
| 12/08/2012*; 12:00 pm, P12N | | Cal State Northridge | W 87–76 | 8–1 | Wells Fargo Arena (5,099); Tempe, AZ |
| 12/12/2012*; 7:00 pm, P12N | | DePaul | L 61–78 | 8–2 | Wells Fargo Arena (5,401); Tempe, AZ |
| 12/15/2012*; 1:00 pm, P12N | | Dartmouth | W 61–42 | 9–2 | Wells Fargo Arena (5,673); Tempe, AZ |
| 12/22/2012*; 12:00 pm, FSSW+ | | at Texas Tech | W 77–62 | 10–2 | United Spirit Arena (7,732); Lubbock, TX |
| 12/29/2012*; 12:00 pm, P12N | | Coppin State | W 68–52 | 11–2 | Wells Fargo Arena (5,623); Tempe, AZ |
| 01/02/2013; 8:00 pm, P12N | | Utah | W 55–54 ^{OT} | 12–2 (1–0) | Wells Fargo Arena (5,314); Tempe, AZ |
| 01/06/2013; 6:00 pm, P12N | | Colorado | W 65–56 | 13–2 (2–0) | Wells Fargo Arena (6,298); Tempe, AZ |
| 01/10/2013; 9:30 pm, P12N | | at Oregon State | W 72–62 | 14–2 (3–0) | Gill Coliseum (4,796); Corvallis, OR |
| 01/13/2013; 7:00 pm, P12N | | at Oregon | L 65–68 | 14–3 (3–1) | Matthew Knight Arena (7,813); Eugene, OR |
| 01/19/2013; 12:30 pm, FSN | | No. 7 Arizona | L 54–71 | 14–4 (3–2) | Well Fargo Arena (10,900); Tempe, AZ |
| 01/24/2013; 8:30 pm, P12N | | USC | W 98–93 ^{OT} | 15–4 (4–2) | Wells Fargo Arena (6,018); Tempe, AZ |
| 01/26/2013; 2:00 pm, FSN | | UCLA | W 78–60 | 16–4 (5–2) | Wells Fargo Arena (9,337); Tempe, AZ |
| 01/31/2013; 9:00 pm, P12N | | at Washington State | W 63–59 | 17–4 (6–2) | Beasley Coliseum (4,728); Pullman, WA |
| 02/02/2013; 7:00 pm, ESPNU | | at Washington | L 92–96 | 17–5 (6–3) | Alaska Airlines Arena (8,417); Seattle, WA |
| 02/07/2013; 7:30 pm, P12N | | California | W 66–62 | 18–5 (7–3) | Wells Fargo Arena (6,010); Tempe, AZ |
| 02/09/2013; 5:00 pm, ESPNU | | Stanford | L 59–62 | 18–6 (7–4) | Wells Fargo Arena (8,459); Tempe, AZ |
| 02/13/2013; 6:00 pm, P12N | | at Utah | L 55–60 | 18–7 (7–5) | Jon M. Huntsman Center (9,062); Salt Lake City, UT |
| 02/16/2013; 7:00 pm, ESPNU | | at Colorado | W 63–62 ^{OT} | 19–7 (8–5) | Coors Events Center (10,926); Boulder, CO |
| 02/20/2013; 8:00 pm, P12N | | Washington State | W 69–57 | 20–7 (9–5) | Wells Fargo Arena (8,236); Tempe, AZ |
| 02/23/2013; 9:00 pm, ESPNU | | Washington | L 59–68 | 20–8 (9–6) | Wells Fargo Arena (10,004); Tempe, AZ |
| 02/27/2013; 9:30 pm, P12N | | at UCLA | L 74–79 ^{OT} | 20–9 (9–7) | Pauley Pavilion (9,305); Los Angeles, CA |
| 03/02/2013; 1:00 pm, FSN | | at USC | L 56–57 | 20–10 (9–8) | Galen Center (4,034); Los Angeles, CA |
| 03/09/2013; 2:30 pm, FSN | | at No. 18 Arizona | L 58–73 | 20–11 (9–9) | McKale Center (14,545); Tucson, AZ |
2013 Pac-12 tournament
| 03/13/2013; 1:00 pm, P12N | | vs. Stanford; First Round | W 89–88 ^{OT} | 21–11 | MGM Grand Garden Arena (7,451); Paradise, NV |
| 03/14/2013; 1:00 pm, P12N | | vs. No. 21 UCLA; Quarterfinals | L 75–80 | 21–12 | MGM Grand Garden Arena (12,915); Paradise, NV |
2013 NIT
| 03/20/2013*; 8:00 pm, ESPNU | No. (3) | (6) Detroit; First Round | W 83–68 | 22–12 | Wells Fargo Arena (3,519); Tempe, AZ |
| 03/22/2013*; 6:00 pm, ESPN2 | No. (3) | at (2) Baylor; Second Round | L 86–89 | 22–13 | Ferrell Center (4,562); Waco, TX |
*Non-conference game. ^{#}Rankings from AP Poll. (#) Tournament seedings in parentheses. All times are in Mountain Time (#) during NIT is Seed within Region.
