= 2012–13 Pac-12 Conference men's basketball season =

2012–13 Pac-12 men's basketball season
- League: NCAA Division I
- Sport: Basketball
- Teams: 12
- TV partner(s): ESPN, FSN, CBS, Pac-12 Network

Regular Season
- Season champions: UCLA Bruins
- Runners-up: Arizona Wildcats; Oregon Ducks; California Golden Bears
- Season MVP: Allen Crabbe, California

Tournament
- Champions: Oregon
- Runners-up: UCLA
- Finals MVP: Johnathan Loyd, Oregon

Basketball seasons
- ← 11–12 13–14 →

2012–13 Pac-12 Conference men's basketball standings
| | Conf. | | | | Overall |
| Team | W | | L | PCT | W | | L | PCT |
|---|---|---|---|---|---|---|---|---|
| No. 24 UCLA | 13 | – | 5 | .722 | 25 | – | 10 | .714 |
| No. 25 Oregon † | 12 | – | 6 | .667 | 28 | – | 9 | .757 |
| No. 21 Arizona | 12 | – | 6 | .667 | 27 | – | 8 | .771 |
| California | 12 | – | 6 | .667 | 21 | – | 12 | .636 |
| Colorado | 10 | – | 8 | .556 | 21 | – | 12 | .636 |
| Arizona State | 9 | – | 9 | .500 | 22 | – | 13 | .629 |
| Stanford | 9 | – | 9 | .500 | 19 | – | 15 | .559 |
| Washington | 9 | – | 9 | .500 | 18 | – | 16 | .529 |
| USC | 9 | – | 9 | .500 | 14 | – | 18 | .438 |
| Utah | 5 | – | 13 | .278 | 15 | – | 18 | .455 |
| Oregon State | 4 | – | 14 | .222 | 14 | – | 18 | .438 |
| Washington State | 4 | – | 14 | .222 | 13 | – | 19 | .406 |
† Conference tournament winner As of March 23, 2013; Rankings from AP Poll

The 2012–13 Pac-12 Conference men's basketball season began with practices in October 2012 and ended with the 2013 Pac-12 Conference men's basketball tournament from March 2013 at the MGM Grand Garden Arena in Paradise, Nevada. The regular season began on the first weekend of November 2012, with the conference schedule starting in December 2012. On March 9, 2013, the UCLA Bruins defeated the Washington Huskies 61–54 to clinch the regular season conference title. They were seeded as the No. 1 team in the Pac-12 Conference tournament in Las Vegas.

This was the second season under the Pac-12 Conference name. In July 2011, two schools joined the conference. Colorado came from the Big 12 and Utah arrived from the Mountain West.

== Pre-season ==
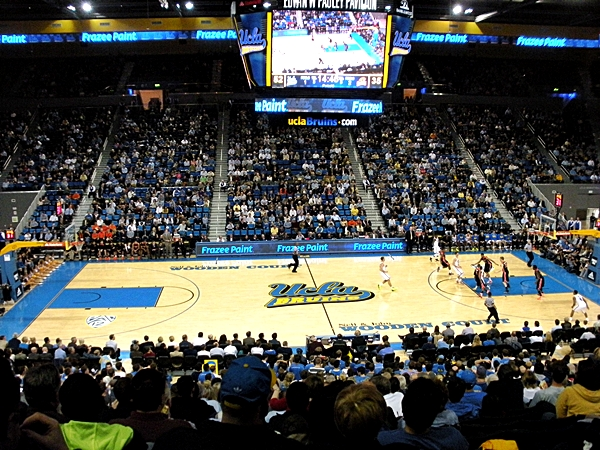
UCLA Bruins vs. Oregon State Beavers, at Pauley Pavilion in January 2013

The Pac-12 media poll released on November 1, 2012:

1. Arizona (15 first-place votes), 403 points
2. UCLA (16), 402
3. California (3), 325
4. Stanford, 296
5. Washington (2), 278
6. Colorado, 262
7. Oregon, 217
8. Oregon State, 166
9. USC, 163
10. Washington State, 111
11. Arizona State, 107
12. Utah, 78

== Rankings ==
Legend
| | Improvement in ranking |
| | Drop in ranking |
| RV | Received votes but were not ranked in Top 25 of poll |

| | | Pre | Wk 2 | Wk 3 | Wk 4 | Wk 5 | Wk 6 | Wk 7 | Wk 8 | Wk 9 | Wk 10 | Wk 11 | Wk 12 | Wk 13 | Wk 14 | Wk 15 | Wk 16 | Wk 17 | Wk 18 | Wk 19 | Post | Final |
|---|---|---|---|---|---|---|---|---|---|---|---|---|---|---|---|---|---|---|---|---|---|---|
| Arizona | AP | 12 | 12 | 10 | 9 | 8 | 8 | 4 | 3 | 3 | 4 | 7 | 6 | 8 | 7 | 9 | 12 | 11 | 18 | 18 | 21 | - |
| Arizona | C | 11 | 12 | 10 | 9 | 8 | 8 | 5 | 3 | 3 | 3 | 7 | 6 | 8 | 7 | 9 | 12 | 11 | 18 | 18 | 20 | 14 |
| Arizona St | AP | NV | NV | NV | NV | NV | NV | NV | NV | NV | NV | NV | NV | RV | NV | NV | NV | NV | NV | NV | NV | - |
| Arizona St | C | NV | NV | NV | NV | NV | NV | NV | NV | NV | RV | NV | NV | RV | NV | NV | NV | NV | NV | NV | NV | NV |
| California | AP | NV | NV | NV | RV | NV | NV | NV | NV | NV | NV | NV | NV | NV | NV | NV | NV | RV | RV | NV | NV | - |
| California | C | NV | NV | NV | RV | NV | NV | NV | NV | NV | NV | NV | NV | NV | NV | NV | NV | RV | RV | RV | NV | RV |
| Colorado | AP | NV | NV | 23 | 19 | RV | NV | NV | NV | NV | NV | NV | NV | NV | NV | NV | NV | NV | NV | NV | NV | - |
| Colorado | C | RV | RV | RV | 19 | RV | NV | NV | RV | RV | NV | NV | NV | NV | NV | NV | NV | NV | NV | NV | NV | NV |
| Oregon | AP | NV | NV | NV | RV | RV | RV | RV | RV | RV | RV | 21 | 16 | 10 | 19 | 23 | 23 | 24 | 19 | RV | 25 | - |
| Oregon | C | NV | NV | NV | RV | RV | NV | RV | RV | NV | NV | RV | 19 | 12 | 19 | RV | 23 | RV | 25 | NV | 24 | 15 |
| Oregon St | AP | NV | NV | NV | NV | NV | NV | NV | NV | NV | NV | NV | NV | NV | NV | NV | NV | NV | NV | NV | NV | - |
| Oregon St | C | NV | NV | NV | NV | NV | NV | NV | NV | NV | NV | NV | NV | NV | NV | NV | NV | NV | NV | NV | NV | NV |
| Stanford | AP | RV | RV | NV | NV | NV | NV | NV | NV | NV | NV | NV | NV | NV | NV | NV | NV | NV | NV | NV | NV | - |
| Stanford | C | RV | RV | RV | NV | NV | NV | NV | NV | NV | NV | NV | NV | NV | NV | NV | NV | NV | NV | NV | NV | NV |
| UCLA | AP | 13 | 13 | 11 | RV | NV | NV | NV | NV | RV | RV | 24 | RV | RV | RV | RV | NV | NV | 23 | 21 | 24 | - |
| UCLA | C | 13 | 14 | 13 | 24 | NV | NV | NV | NV | RV | RV | 25 | RV | RV | RV | RV | RV | RV | RV | 25 | RV | RV |
| USC | AP | NV | NV | NV | NV | NV | NV | NV | NV | NV | NV | NV | NV | NV | NV | NV | NV | NV | NV | NV | NV | - |
| USC | C | NV | NV | NV | NV | NV | NV | NV | NV | NV | NV | NV | NV | NV | NV | NV | NV | NV | NV | NV | NV | NV |
| Utah | AP | NV | NV | NV | NV | NV | NV | NV | NV | NV | NV | NV | NV | NV | NV | NV | NV | NV | NV | NV | NV | - |
| Utah | C | NV | NV | NV | NV | NV | NV | NV | NV | NV | NV | NV | NV | NV | NV | NV | NV | NV | NV | NV | NV | NV |
| Washington | AP | NV | NV | NV | NV | NV | NV | NV | NV | NV | NV | NV | NV | NV | NV | NV | NV | NV | NV | NV | NV | - |
| Washington | C | NV | NV | NV | NV | NV | NV | NV | NV | NV | NV | NV | NV | NV | NV | NV | NV | NV | NV | NV | NV | NV |
| Washington St | AP | NV | NV | NV | NV | NV | NV | NV | NV | NV | NV | NV | NV | NV | NV | NV | NV | NV | NV | NV | NV | - |
| Washington St | C | NV | NV | NV | NV | NV | NV | NV | NV | NV | NV | NV | NV | NV | NV | NV | NV | NV | NV | NV | NV | NV |

== Conference Schedule ==
=== Composite Matrix ===
This table summarizes the head-to-head results between teams in conference play.

| | Arizona | Arizona St | California | Colorado | Oregon | Oregon St | Stanford | UCLA | USC | Utah | Washington | Washington St |
|---|---|---|---|---|---|---|---|---|---|---|---|---|
| vs. Arizona | – | 0–2 | 1–0 | 1–1 | 1–0 | 0–1 | 0–1 | 2–0 | 1–1 | 0–2 | 0–2 | 0–2 |
| vs. Arizona State | 2–0 | – | 0–1 | 0–2 | 1–0 | 0–1 | 1–0 | 1–1 | 1–1 | 1–1 | 2–0 | 0–2 |
| vs. California | 0–1 | 0–1 | – | 1–1 | 0–2 | 0–2 | 2–0 | 1–1 | 0–2 | 0–2 | 1–0 | 0–1 |
| vs. Colorado | 1–1 | 2–0 | 1–1 | – | 0–2 | 1–1 | 0–2 | 1–0 | 0–1 | 1–1 | 1–0 | 0–1 |
| vs. Oregon | 0–1 | 0–1 | 2–0 | 1–0 | – | 0–2 | 1–1 | 0–1 | 0–1 | 1–1 | 0–2 | 0–2 |
| vs. Oregon State | 1–0 | 1–0 | 2–0 | 1–0 | 2–0 | – | 2–0 | 1–0 | 1–0 | 1–1 | 1–1 | 1–1 |
| vs. Stanford | 1–0 | 0–1 | 0–2 | 2–0 | 1–1 | 0–2 | – | 2–0 | 2–0 | 0–2 | 1–0 | 0–1 |
| vs. UCLA | 0–2 | 1–1 | 1–1 | 0–1 | 1–0 | 0–1 | 0–2 | – | 1–1 | 0–1 | 0–2 | 1–1 |
| vs. USC | 1–1 | 1–1 | 2–0 | 1–0 | 1–0 | 0–1 | 0–2 | 1–1 | – | 0–1 | 1–1 | 1–1 |
| vs. Utah | 2–0 | 1–1 | 2–0 | 1–1 | 1–1 | 0–1 | 2–0 | 1–0 | 1–0 | – | 0–1 | 1–0 |
| vs. Washington | 2–0 | 0–2 | 0–1 | 0–1 | 2–0 | 1–1 | 1–1 | 2–0 | 1–1 | 1–0 | – | 0–2 |
| vs. Washington State | 2–0 | 2–0 | 1–0 | 1–0 | 2–0 | 1–1 | 1–0 | 1–1 | 1–0 | 0–1 | 2–0 | – |
| Total | 12–6 | 9–8 | 12–6 | 10–8 | 12–6 | 4–14 | 9–9 | 13–5 | 9–8 | 5-13 | 9–9 | 4–14 |

== Conference tournament ==
- March 2013 – Pac-12 Conference Basketball Tournament, MGM Grand Garden Arena, Paradise, Nevada.

First round March 13, 2013
8 | Stanford | 88
9 | Arizona State | 89^{OT}
5 | Colorado | 74
12 | Oregon State | 68
7 | USC | 66
10 | Utah | 69
6 | Washington | 64
11 | Washington State | 62

Quarterfinals; March 14, 2013
1 | #21 UCLA | 80
9 | Arizona State | 75
4 | #18 Arizona | 79
5 | Colorado | 69
2 | California | 69
10 | Utah | 79^{OT}
3 | Oregon | 80^{OT}
6 | Washington | 77

Semifinals; March 15, 2013
1 | #21 UCLA | 66
4 | #18 Arizona | 64
10 | Utah | 45
3 | Oregon | 64

Championship Game; March 16, 2013
1 | #21 UCLA | 69
3 | Oregon | 78

== Head coaches ==
Sean Miller, Arizona
Herb Sendek, Arizona State
Mike Montgomery, California
Tad Boyle, Colorado
Dana Altman, Oregon
Craig Robinson, Oregon State
Johnny Dawkins, Stanford
Ben Howland, UCLA
Bob Cantu (interim head coach replaced Kevin O'Neill), USC
Larry Krystkowiak, Utah
Lorenzo Romar, Washington
Ken Bone, Washington State

== Postseason ==
=== NCAA tournament ===
| Seed | Region | School | Second round | Third round | Sweet 16 | Elite Eight | Final Four | Championship |
|---|---|---|---|---|---|---|---|---|
| 6 | West | Arizona | #11 Belmont - Mar. 21, Salt Lake City - W, 81–64 | #14 Harvard - Mar. 23, Salt Lake City - W, 74–51 | #2 Ohio State - Mar. 28, Los Angeles - L, 70–73 | | | |
| 6 | South | UCLA | #11 Minnesota - Mar. 22, Austin - L, 63–83 | | | | | |
| 10 | East | Colorado | #7 Illinois - Mar. 22, Austin - L, 49–57 | | | | | |
| 12 | East | California | #5 UNLV - Mar. 21, San Jose - W, 64–61 | #4 Syracuse - Mar. 23, San Jose - L, 60–66 | | | | |
| 12 | Midwest | Oregon | #5 Oklahoma State - Mar. 21, San Jose - W, 68–55 | #4 Saint Louis - Mar. 23, San Jose - W, 74–57 | #1 Louisville - Mar. 29, Indianapolis - L, 69–77 | | | |
| | Bids | W-L (%): | 3–2 .600 | 2–1 .667 | 0–2 .000 | 0–0 – | 0–0 – | TOTAL: 5–5 .500 |

=== National Invitation tournament ===
| Seed | Bracket | School | First round | Second round | Quarterfinals | Semifinals | Finals |
|---|---|---|---|---|---|---|---|
| 3 | Kentucky | Arizona State | #6 Detroit - Mar. 20, Tempe - W, 83–68 | #2 Baylor - Mar. 22, Waco - L, 86–89 | | | |
| 4 | Alabama | Stanford | #5 Stephen F. Austin - Mar. 19, Stanford - W, 58–57 | #1 Alabama - Mar. 23, Tuscaloosa - L, 54–66 | | | |
| 6 | Southern Miss | Washington | #7 BYU - Mar. 19, Provo - L, 79–90 | | | | |
| | 3 Bids | W-L (%): | 2–1 .667 | 0–2 .000 | 0–0 – | 0–0 – | TOTAL: 2–3 .400 |

== Highlights and notes ==
- November 1, 2012 – Media Day was held in San Francisco
- January 14, 2013 – USC head coach Kevin O'Neill was removed as head coach and associate head coach Bob Cantu took over as interim head coach, athletic director Pat Haden announced.
- March 2, 2013 – UCLA set a new attendance record of 13,727 at Pauley Pavilion
- March 6, 2013 - Washington State breaks a 19-game home losing against UCLA, defeating the Bruins 73–61.
- March 9, 2013 – UCLA won for the first time at Washington since January 2004.
- March 24, 2013 – UCLA relieved coach Ben Howland of his duties.
- March 30, 2013 – Steve Alford was named the UCLA Bruins' 13th head men's basketball coach

== Awards and honors ==
- The Pac-12 Coach of the Year Award in both men's and women's basketball is now known as the John Wooden Coach of the Year Award.

=== Player-of-the-Week ===
- Nov. 12 – Ahmad Starks, Oregon State
- Nov. 26 – Justin Cobbs, California
- Dec. 10 – Brock Motum, Washington State
- Dec. 24 – Eric Moreland, Oregon State
- Jan. 7 – Carrick Felix, Arizona State
- Jan. 21 – Mark Lyons, Arizona
- Feb. 4 – Josh Huestis, Stanford
- Feb. 18 – Allen Crabbe, California
- Mar. 5 – Kyle Anderson, UCLA
- Nov. 19 – Askia Booker, Colorado
- Dec. 3 – Carrick Felix, Arizona State
- Dec. 17 – André Roberson, Jr., Colorado
- Dec. 31 – Shabazz Muhammad, UCLA
- Jan. 14 – C. J. Wilcox, Washington
- Jan. 28 – Carrick Felix, Arizona State
- Feb. 11 – Allen Crabbe, California
- Feb. 25 – Justin Cobbs, California
- Mar. 11 – Brock Motum, Washington State

=== All-Pac-12 teams ===
Voting was by conference coaches:

- Player of The Year: Allen Crabbe, Cal
- Freshman of The Year: Shabazz Muhammad, UCLA; Jahii Carson, ASU
- Defensive Player of The Year: André Roberson, Colorado
- Most Improved Player of The Year: Dwight Powell, Stanford
- John R. Wooden Coach of the Year: Dana Altman, Oregon

First Team:

| Name | School | Pos. | Year |
|---|---|---|---|
| Jahii Carson | ASU | G | Fr. |
| Allen Crabbe | Cal | G | Jr. |
| Spencer Dinwiddie | Colorado | G | So. |
| Larry Drew II | UCLA | G | Sr. |
| Solomon Hill | Arizona | F | Sr. |
| Mark Lyons | Arizona | G | Sr. |
| Shabazz Muhammad | UCLA | G/F | Fr. |
| Dwight Powell | Stanford | F | Jr. |
| André Roberson | Colorado | F | Jr. |
| E. J. Singler | Oregon | F | Sr. |

=== All-Academic ===
First Team:

| Player, School | Year | GPA | Major |

Second Team:

| Player, School | Year | GPA | Major |

=== USBWA All-District team ===
District VIII

- Player of The Year: André Roberson, Colorado

| Name | School | Pos. | Year |
|---|---|---|---|
| Spencer Dinwiddie | Colorado | G | So. |
| André Roberson | Colorado | F | Jr. |

District IX

| Name | School | Pos. | Year |
|---|---|---|---|
| Jahii Carson | Arizona State | G | Fr. |
| Allen Crabbe | California | G | Jr. |
| Carrick Felix | Arizona State | G/F | Sr. |
| Solomon Hill | Arizona | F | Sr. |
| Mark Lyons | Arizona | G | Sr. |
| Brock Motum | Washington State | F | Sr. |
| Shabazz Muhammad | UCLA | G | Fr. |

=== NBA draft ===
| Round | Pick | Player | Position | Nationality | Team | School/club team |
|---|---|---|---|---|---|---|
| 1 | 14 | Shabazz Muhammad | SG/SF | United States | Utah Jazz (traded to Minnesota) | UCLA (Fr.) |
| 1 | 23 | Solomon Hill | SF | United States | Indiana Pacers | Arizona (Sr.) |
| 1 | 26 | André Roberson | SG/SF | United States | Minnesota Timberwolves (from Memphis to Houston, traded to Oklahoma City via Golden State) | Colorado (Jr.) |
| 2 | 31 | Allen Crabbe | SG | United States | Cleveland Cavaliers (from Orlando, traded to Portland) | California (Jr.) |
| 2 | 33 | Carrick Felix | SG | United States | Cleveland Cavaliers | Arizona State (Sr.) |
| 2 | 40 | Grant Jerrett | PF | United States | Portland Trail Blazers (traded to Oklahoma City) | Arizona (Fr.) |
| 2 | 54 | Arsalan Kazemi | PF | Iran | Washington Wizards (from New York, traded to Philadelphia) | Oregon (Sr.) |
