= 2012–13 New Mexico Lobos men's basketball team =

American college basketball season

2012–13 New Mexico Lobos men's basketball

Paradise Jam tournament champions Mountain West regular season & tournament champions

NCAA Tournament, round of 64
- Conference: Mountain West Conference

Ranking
- Coaches: No. 19
- AP: No. 11
- Record: 29–6 (13–3 Mountain West)
- Head coach: Steve Alford (6th season)
- Assistant coaches: Craig Neal; Drew Adams; Duane Broussard
- Home arena: The Pit (Capacity: 15,411)

2012–13 Mountain West Conference men's basketball standings
	Conf.				Overall
Team	W		L	PCT	W		L	PCT
No. 10 New Mexico †	13	–	3	.813	29	–	6	.829
Colorado State	11	–	5	.688	26	–	9	.743
UNLV	10	–	6	.625	25	–	10	.714
San Diego State	9	–	7	.563	23	–	11	.676
Boise State	9	–	7	.563	21	–	11	.656
Air Force	8	–	8	.500	18	–	14	.563
Fresno State	5	–	11	.313	11	–	19	.367
Wyoming	4	–	12	.250	20	–	14	.588
Nevada	3	–	13	.188	12	–	19	.387
† 2013 MWC tournament winner Rankings from AP Poll

The 2012–13 New Mexico Lobos men's basketball team represented the University of New Mexico as a member of the Mountain West Conference during the 2012–13 NCAA Division I men's basketball season. The Lobos were coached by sixth-year head coach Steve Alford and played their home games at The Pit in Albuquerque, New Mexico. They finish with a record of 29–6 overall and 13–3 in Mountain West play to win the Mountain West regular season championship. They were also champions of the Mountain West tournament, defeating UNLV in the championship game, to earn an automatic bid to the 2013 NCAA tournament. In the tournament, they were upset by Harvard in the first round.

On March 20, head coach Steve Alford signed a 10-year contract extension. However, on April 2 Alford resigned to take the head coaching job at UCLA.

== Departures ==
Name	Number	Pos.	Height	Weight	Year	Hometown	Notes
A.J. Hardeman	00	F	6'8"	235	Senior	Del Valle, Texas	Graduated
Phillip McDonald	23	G	6'5"	200	Senior	Cypress, Texas	Graduated
Drew Gordon	32	F	6'9"	245	Senior	San Jose, California	Graduated

== Recruiting ==
College recruiting information
Name	Hometown	School	Height	Weight	Commit date
Obij Aget; C	La Porte, IN	La Lumiere School	7 ft 0 in (2.13 m)	220 lb (100 kg)	Aug 30, 2011
Obij Aget; C	Recruit ratings: Scout: Rivals: ESPN: (86)				
Nick Banyard; PF	Flower Mound, TX	Marcus High School	6 ft 8 in (2.03 m)	210 lb (95 kg)	Sep 13, 2011
Nick Banyard; PF	Recruit ratings: Scout: Rivals: ESPN: (86)				
Cleveland Thomas; SG	Baton Rouge, LA	Scotlandville Magnet High School	6 ft 4 in (1.93 m)	190 lb (86 kg)	May 16, 2011
Cleveland Thomas; SG	Recruit ratings: Scout: Rivals: ESPN: (83)				
Devon Williams; PF	Dallas, TX	Woodrow Wilson High School	6 ft 7 in (2.01 m)	200 lb (91 kg)	Oct 4, 2011
Devon Williams; PF	Recruit ratings: Scout: Rivals: ESPN: (82)				
Overall recruit ranking: Scout: – Rivals: –
Note: In many cases, Scout, Rivals, 247Sports, On3, and ESPN may conflict in their listings of height and weight.; In these cases, the average was taken. ESPN grades are on a 100-point scale.; Sources: "New Mexico Commit List for 2012". Rivals.; "Men's Basketball Recruiting". Scout.; "ESPN – New Mexico Lobos Basketball Recruiting 2012". ESPN.; "Scout.com Team Recruiting Rankings". Scout.; "2012 Team Ranking". Rivals.

== Roster ==
2012–13 New Mexico Lobos men's basketball team
Players
Coaches

Pos.	#	Name	Height	Weight	Year	Hometown
G	1	Cleveland Thomas	6 ft 3 in (1.91 m)	190 lb (86 kg)	Fr	Baton Rouge, Louisiana
G	2	Christopher Perez	6 ft 0 in (1.83 m)	185 lb (84 kg)	Jr	Corona, California
G	3	Hugh Greenwood	6 ft 3 in (1.91 m)	205 lb (93 kg)	So	Hobart, Australia
G	4	Chad Adams	6 ft 6 in (1.98 m)	190 lb (86 kg)	Sr	Albuquerque, New Mexico
G	10	Kendall Williams	6 ft 3 in (1.91 m)	185 lb (84 kg)	Jr	Rancho Cucamonga, California
F	12	Devon Williams	6 ft 7 in (2.01 m)	205 lb (93 kg)	Fr	Dallas, Texas
G	13	Jamal Fenton	5 ft 9 in (1.75 m)	170 lb (77 kg)	Sr	Houston, Texas
G	21	Tony Snell	6 ft 7 in (2.01 m)	200 lb (91 kg)	Jr	Riverside, California
G	22	Merv Lindsay	6 ft 7 in (2.01 m)	205 lb (93 kg)	So	Moreno Valley, California
F	23	Nick Banyard	6 ft 8 in (2.03 m)	205 lb (93 kg)	Fr	Flower Mound, Texas
G	24	Kory Alford	6 ft 4 in (1.93 m)	185 lb (84 kg)	RS Fr	Albuquerque, New Mexico
G	40	Demetrius Walker	6 ft 2 in (1.88 m)	190 lb (86 kg)	RS Jr	Fontana, California
F	41	Cameron Bairstow	6 ft 9 in (2.06 m)	250 lb (113 kg)	Jr	Brisbane, Australia
C	53	Alex Kirk	7 ft 0 in (2.13 m)	250 lb (113 kg)	RS So	Los Alamos, New Mexico

Head coach

- Steve Alford (Indiana)

Assistant coach(es)

- Craig Neal (Georgia Tech)
- Drew Adams (Tennessee)
- Duane Broussard (Bradley)

Legend

- (C) Team captain
- (S) Suspended
- (I) Ineligible
- (W) Walk-on
- Injured
- Current redshirt

Roster
Last update: 2012-09-09

== 2012–13 Schedule ==
- All times are Mountain

Date time, TV	Rank^{#}	Opponent^{#}	Result	Record	Site (attendance) city, state
Exhibition
10/31/2012*; 7:00 pm		Victory	W 105–64	–	The Pit (12,440); Albuquerque, NM
11/05/2012*; 7:00 pm		New Mexico Highlands	W 92–70	–	The Pit (13,055); Albuquerque, NM
Non-conference regular season
11/13/2012*; 11:59 pm, ESPN		Davidson; ESPN Tip-Off Marathon	W 86–81	1–0	The Pit (14,277); Albuquerque, NM
11/16/2012*; 2:00 pm, CBSSN		vs. UIC; Paradise Jam Quarterfinals	W 66–59	2–0	Sports and Fitness Center (N/A); St. Thomas, VI
11/18/2012*; 4:00 pm, CBSSN		vs. George Mason; Paradise Jam semifinals	W 70–69	3–0	Sports and Fitness Center (N/A); St. Thomas, VI
11/19/2012*; 8:00 pm, CBSSN		vs. No. 21 Connecticut; Paradise Jam Finals	W 66–60	4–0	Sports and Fitness Center (3,022); St. Thomas, VI
11/23/2012*; 8:30 pm		Idaho	W 73–58	5–0	The Pit (14,741); Albuquerque, NM
11/25/2012*; 6:00 pm, KASY/RTRM		Portland	W 69–54	6–0	The Pit (13,487); Albuquerque, NM
11/28/2012*; 7:00 pm, KASY/RTRM	No. 25	Mercer	W 76–58	7–0	The Pit (13,561); Albuquerque, NM
12/01/2012*; 12:00 pm	No. 25	at Indiana State; MWC-MVC Challenge	W 77–68 ^{OT}	8–0	Hulman Center (6,080); Terre Haute, IN
12/05/2012*; 8:00 pm, CBSSN	No. 18	USC	W 75–67	9–0	The Pit (15,241); Albuquerque, NM
12/08/2012*; 7:00 pm, KASY/RTRM	No. 18	Valparaiso	W 65–52	10–0	The Pit (15,244); Albuquerque, NM
12/15/2012*; 4:00 pm, CBSSN	No. 17	New Mexico State; Rio Grande Rivalry	W 73–58	11–0	The Pit (15,411); Albuquerque, NM
12/19/2012*; 7:00 pm, AggieVision	No. 16	at New Mexico State; Rio Grande Rivalry	W 68–63	12–0	Pan American Center (8,177); Las Cruces, NM
12/22/2012*; 12:30 pm, KASY/RTRM	No. 16	South Dakota State	L 65–70	12–1	The Pit (15,278); Albuquerque, NM
12/27/2012*; 7:00 pm, ESPN2		at No. 8 Cincinnati	W 55–54	13–1	Fifth Third Arena (10,627); Cincinnati, OH
12/31/2012*; 5:30 pm, CBSSN	No. 20	at Saint Louis	L 46–60	13–2	Chaifetz Arena (6,782); Saint Louis, MO
Mountain West regular season
01/09/2013; 8:00 pm, CBSSN	No. 25	No. 24 UNLV	W 65–60	14–2 (1–0)	The Pit (15,411); Albuquerque, NM
01/12/2013; 1:00 pm, KASY	No. 25	Fresno State	W 72–45	15–2 (2–0)	The Pit (15,337); Albuquerque, NM
01/16/2013; 7:00 pm, RTRM	No. 19	at Boise State	W 79–74 ^{OT}	16–2 (3–0)	Taco Bell Arena (10,420); Boise, ID
01/23/2013; 6:00 pm, CBSSN	No. 15	Colorado State	W 66–61	17–2 (4–0)	The Pit (15,411); Albuquerque, NM
01/26/2013; 2:00 pm, NBCSN	No. 15	at San Diego State	L 34–55	17–3 (4–1)	Viejas Arena (12,414); San Diego, CA
01/30/2013; 7:00 pm, RTRM	No. 20	at Wyoming	W 63–59	18–3 (5–1)	Arena-Auditorium (5,376); Laramie, WY
02/02/2013; 6:00 pm, NBCSN	No. 20	Nevada	W 75–62	19–3 (6–1)	The Pit (15,346); Albuquerque, NM
02/06/2013; 7:00 pm, KASY/RTRM	No. 15	Air Force	W 81–58	20–3 (7–1)	The Pit (15,373); Albuquerque, NM
02/09/2013; 7:00 pm, NBCSN	No. 15	at UNLV	L 55–64	20–4 (7–2)	Thomas & Mack Center (17,738); Paradise, NV
02/13/2013; 8:00 pm	No. 19	at Fresno State	W 54–48	21–4 (8–2)	Save Mart Center (8,241); Fresno, CA
02/16/2013; 7:00 pm, KASY/RTRM	No. 19	Boise State	W 60–50	22–4 (9–2)	The Pit (15,411); Albuquerque, NM
02/23/2013; 2:00 pm, NBCSN	No. 16	at No. 22 Colorado State	W 91–82	23–4 (10–2)	Moby Arena (8,745); Fort Collins, CO
02/27/2013; 8:15 pm, CBSSN	No. 14	San Diego State	W 70–60	24–4 (11–2)	The Pit (15,411); Albuquerque, NM
03/02/2013; 3:00 pm, KASY/RTRM	No. 14	Wyoming	W 53–42	25–4 (12–2)	The Pit (15,411); Albuquerque, NM
03/06/2013; 8:00 pm, CBSSN	No. 12	at Nevada	W 75–62	26–4 (13–2)	Lawlor Events Center (6,401); Reno, NV
03/09/2013; 4:00 pm, ALT	No. 12	at Air Force	L 88–89	26–5 (13–3)	Clune Arena (6,117); Colorado Springs, CO
2013 Mountain West Conference tournament
03/13/2013; 7:30 pm, CBSSN	(1) No. 15	vs. (8) Wyoming; Quarterfinals	W 59–46	27–5	Thomas & Mack Center (13,297); Paradise, NV
03/15/2013; 7:00 pm, CBSSN	(1) No. 15	vs. (4) San Diego State; Semifinals	W 60–50	28–5	Thomas & Mack Center (18,500); Paradise, NV
03/16/2013; 4:00 pm, CBS	(1) No. 15	vs. (3) UNLV; Championship Game	W 63–56	29–5	Thomas & Mack Center (18,500); Paradise, NV
2013 NCAA tournament
03/21/2013*; 8:10 pm, TNT	(3 W) No. 11	vs. (14 W) Harvard; Second Round	L 62–68	29–6	EnergySolutions Arena (14,345); Salt Lake City, UT
*Non-conference game. ^{#}Rankings from AP Poll. (#) Tournament seedings in parentheses.

== Rankings ==
Ranking movement Legend: ██ Increase in ranking. ██ Decrease in ranking. ██ Not ranked the previous week.
Poll	Pre	Wk 1	Wk 2	Wk 3	Wk 4	Wk 5	Wk 6	Wk 7	Wk 8	Wk 9	Wk 10	Wk 11	Wk 12	Wk 13	Wk 14	Wk 15	Wk 16	Wk 17	Wk 18	Wk 19	Final
AP	RV	RV	RV	RV	25	18	17	16	RV	20	25	19	15	20	15	19	16	14	12	15	11
Coaches	RV	RV	RV	RV	23	20	20	17	RV	23	RV	21	17	22	16	18	16	14	11	16	10
