= Tony Snell =

American basketball player (born 1991)

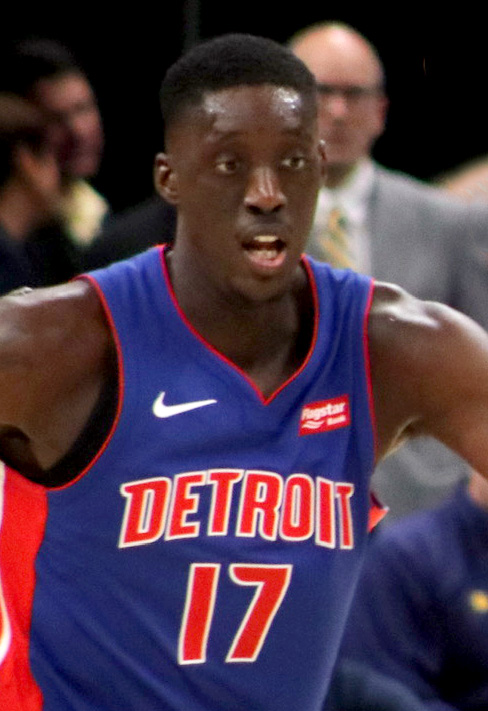
- Snell with the Detroit Pistons in 2019

No. 21 – Cholet Basket
- Position: Shooting guard / small forward
- League: LNB Élite; Champions League

Personal information
- Born: November 10, 1991 (age 35) Los Angeles, California, U.S.
- Listed height: 6 ft 6 in (1.98 m)
- Listed weight: 213 lb (97 kg)

Career information
- High school: Martin Luther King (Riverside, California); Westwind Academy (Phoenix, Arizona)
- College: New Mexico (2010–2013)
- NBA draft: 2013: 1st round, 20th overall pick
- Drafted by: Chicago Bulls
- Playing career: 2013–present

Career history
- 2013–2016: Chicago Bulls
- 2016–2019: Milwaukee Bucks
- 2019–2020: Detroit Pistons
- 2020–2021: Atlanta Hawks
- 2021–2022: Portland Trail Blazers
- 2022: New Orleans Pelicans
- 2023–2024: Maine Celtics
- 2024–2025: Sioux Falls Skyforce
- 2025–2026: Boulazac Basket Dordogne
- 2026–present: Cholet Basket

Career highlights
- Third-team All-MWC (2013); MWC tournament MVP (2013)
- Stats at NBA.com
- Stats at Basketball Reference

Tony Rena Snell Jr. (born November 10, 1991) is an American professional basketball player for Cholet Basket of the LNB Élite. He played college basketball for the New Mexico Lobos. Snell was drafted with the 20th overall pick in the 2013 NBA draft by the Chicago Bulls. He is also the first NBA player to be state publicly that he had been diagnosed with autism.

Born in the Watts neighborhood of Los Angeles, California, Snell moved to Phoenix, Arizona, before his senior year to finish high school at Westwind Preparatory Academy. He was the starting shooting guard for the New Mexico Lobos in his sophomore and junior seasons, helping lead the Lobos to back-to-back Mountain West Conference (MWC) regular-season and conference tournament championships as well as NCAA tournament bids.

== High school career ==
Snell attended Martin Luther King High School in Riverside, California, in 2008–09, where he and teammate Kawhi Leonard, a future two-time NBA Finals MVP, led the Wolves to a 30–3 season and a number 7 national ranking in the MaxPreps/National Guard computer rankings. In 2015, Leonard publicly expressed pride in Snell's development when the two faced each other in the NBA. Snell averaged 14 points, seven rebounds, four blocks and five assists per game. In 2009 Snell enrolled at Westwind Preparatory Academy in Phoenix, where he averaged 19.5 points, 10 rebounds, 8.8 assists, 2.7 steals and 1.8 blocks. At Westwind he was a teammate of Jamaal Franklin, who went on to play for San Diego State University and was drafted by the Memphis Grizzlies in 2013.

== College career ==
=== 2010–11 season: Freshman year ===
In 2009, ESPN scouting reports called Snell "one of the top sleepers on the West Coast" and a "diamond in the rough". Snell committed to play for the New Mexico Lobos on September 15, 2009, and signed in November 2009.

The 2010–11 Lobo squad was young and inexperienced, led by lone senior Dairese Gary and UCLA transfer Drew Gordon. Snell was one of four freshmen playing significant minutes, along with Kendall Williams, Alex Kirk and Cameron Bairstow, one of the most accomplished recruiting classes in Lobo history. The team had a roller-coaster season, starting 10–1 and later winning four straight twice, but also losing four straight and six of nine. They beat number 3 BYU in Provo late in the season, but lost to the Cougars in the MWC tournament. The Lobos received a bid to the 2011 National Invitation Tournament and beat UTEP before losing at Alabama to finish the season 22–13.

Snell played in all but one game, averaging 4.4 points and two rebounds. He scored in double-figures four times and led the team in scoring twice. He had a breakout performance with 16 points against then-number 9 BYU, hitting four three-pointers, followed two games later by a season-best 19, with five threes, against Wyoming. He started seven games, averaging 8.3 points in his starts, and in one seven-game stretch he averaged 10.3 points a game and shot 17 of 31 (.548) from three. A sprained ankle late in the season limited his play and cut his production, as he managed just 11 points in the last eight games of the season.

=== 2011–12 season: Sophomore year ===
The Lobos in 2011–12 were anchored by the dominant inside play of Gordon, who tallied 19 double-doubles and whose 11.1 rebounds per game were fourth in the nation. The team allowed just 59.3 points per game, the lowest ever for the Lobos in the shot clock era, and they held opponents under 40% shooting for the first time since the 1964–65 season. Their scoring defense was fourteenth nationally, and their defensive field goal percentage was seventh.

Snell was among several young guards battling for playing time going into the season, as senior and three-year starter Phillip McDonald was hampered by injury. Snell earned a starting spot after "tearing it up in practice" and playing well in preseason exhibition games. He was capable of explosive scoring, but he was also prone to becoming tentative and falling into slumps. He scored in double-figures in twenty games, including three games over 20, twice scoring 24, hitting six threes in one of those games; yet he also scored six or fewer points in eleven games, going scoreless for two straight games at one point. For the season, Snell averaged 10.5 points, 2.7 rebounds and 2.3 assists a game.

The Lobos won thirteen straight early in the season on the way to a 15–2 record. They lost their next two games to No. 16 San Diego State and at No. 14 UNLV but then won seven straight, avenging those losses and climbing into the top twenty with a 22–4 record. After two upset losses they settled for a share of the MWC regular-season championship. In the conference tournament semi-finals, the Lobos won at No. 20 UNLV, with Snell accounting for 15 points, six rebounds and six assists. The Lobos won the championship game over number 18 San Diego State, as Snell scored 14, shooting 4-6 from three, and was named to the All-Tournament team. New Mexico received a five-seed in the NCAA tournament, but Snell was a non-factor, shooting a combined 1-9 (1-8 from three) and scoring just three points as the Lobos beat Long Beach State then lost to Final Four-bound Louisville. The Lobos finished the season 28–7, and Snell was named Honorable Mention All-Mountain West.

=== 2012–13 season: Junior year ===
The 2012–13 Lobos again relied on tough defense and a balanced scoring attack, often coming from behind to grind out close wins. The team held opponents to sixty points a game and again held them under 40% shooting, while going 10–2 in games decided by six or fewer points. While Williams led the team at just 13.3 points a game, four players averaged in double-figures, and seven Lobo players led the team in scoring in individual games. Snell led the team in ten games, including five straight during a late stretch when he averaged 19.8 a game and shot 22 of 39 (.564) from three-point range. On the season, Snell averaged 12.5 points, 2.6 rebounds and 2.9 assists a game, and he led the team in three-point shooting percentage and, for the second straight season, free throw percentage. Over his career, he was the fifth most accurate free throw shooter in Lobo history.

The Lobos began the season 12–0, including a win over number 19 Connecticut, and climbed to No. 16 in the polls. They lost a couple of games to eventual NCAA tournament teams South Dakota State and St. Louis, but also won at No. 8 Cincinnati. After a bad loss at No. 20 San Diego State, they won nine out of ten and clinched the MWC regular-season title, while reaching No. 11. Snell assumed more of a leadership role, an adjustment due to his quiet demeanor—his mother termed him the "silent assassin", a nickname that Lobo fans embraced. He scored 20 points or more in six games, 25 or more in three games, but he continued to struggle at times, scoring under ten points in 13 games, with a low of five. In the MWC tournament, Snell averaged 17.7 points a game while shooting 12 of 20 (.600) from three-point range. In the semi-final game against San Diego State, he made three three-pointers in 55 seconds as the Lobos built a large lead. In the championship game at UNLV, he shot 8 of 11 from the field, 5 of 7 from three, at one point scoring 13 straight points for the Lobos as they pulled away to seal their second straight tourney title. Snell was named tournament MVP and ESPN national player of the week for his performance. After the season, he was named Third Team All-MWC. New Mexico entered the NCAA tournament ranked No. 10 and received a three-seed. They suffered a disappointing upset to Harvard, however, to finish the season 29–6. The Lobos shot poorly, with Snell going 4 of 12, 1 of 6 from three, for just nine points.

Snell chose to forgo his senior season and declared for the NBA draft. While his college numbers were not spectacular, NBA scouts noted that the Lobos' balanced offense limited his output, and they were impressed by his length, outside shooting, and greatly improved defense.

== Professional career ==
=== Chicago Bulls (2013–2016) ===
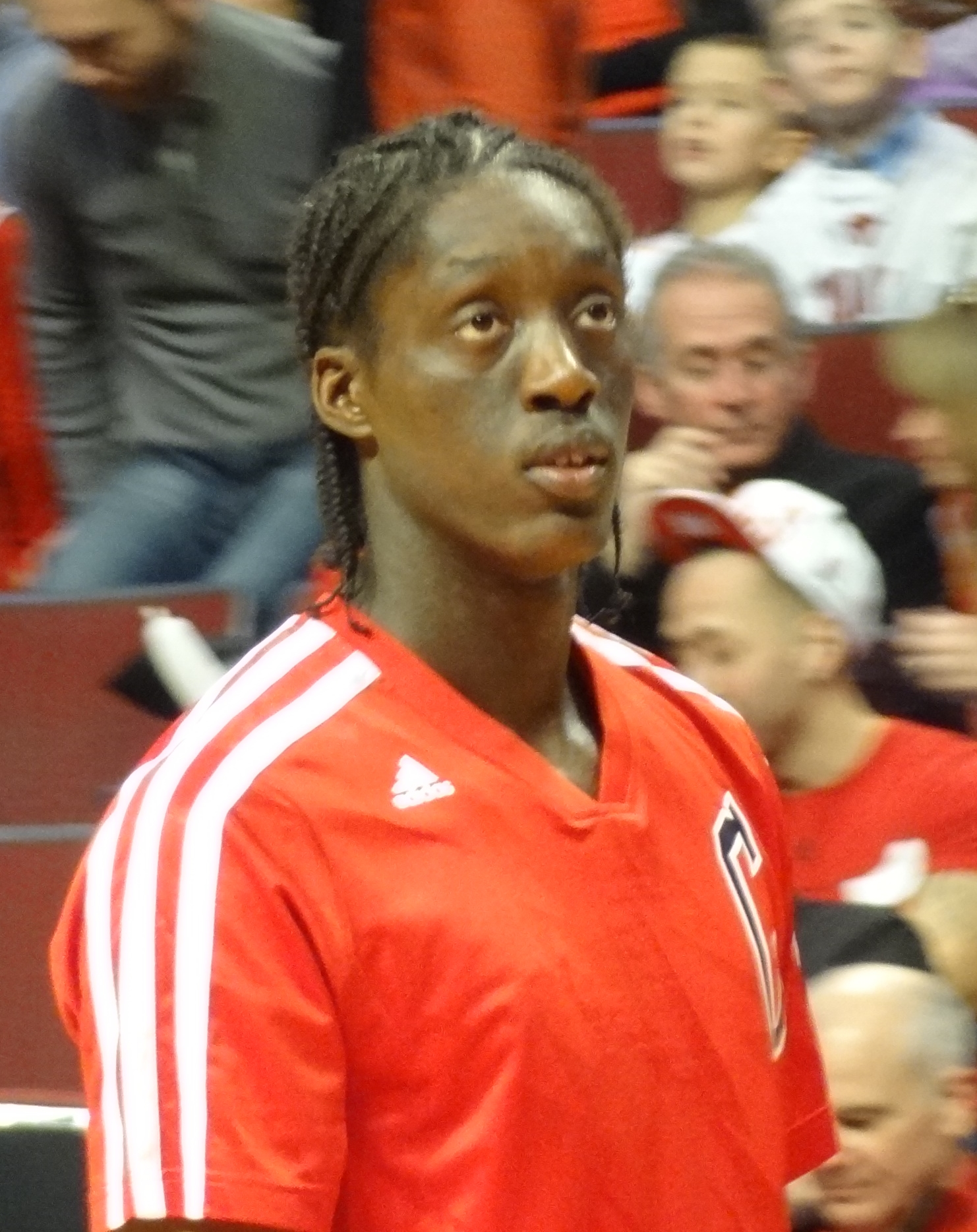
Snell during his rookie season with the Bulls in 2014

Snell was selected with the 20th overall pick in 2013 NBA draft by the Chicago Bulls. On July 10, 2013, he signed with the Bulls and joined them for 2013 NBA Summer League, where he averaged 11.8 points, 6.6 rebounds, 2.2 assists and 1.99 steals in five games. As a rookie in 2013–14, Snell appeared in 77 games for the Bulls, averaging 4.5 points and 1.6 rebounds per game.

In July 2014, Snell re-joined the Bulls for the 2014 NBA Summer League, where he averaged 20.0 points, 4.0 rebounds and 2.8 assists in five games, earning All-NBA Summer League first team honors. He was reunited with former Lobo teammates Bairstow (2014 Bulls' draftee) and Williams on the Bulls' summer league squad. On February 10, 2015, he scored a career-high 24 points in the Bulls' 104–86 win over the Sacramento Kings.

Snell became the Bulls' starting small forward to begin the 2015–16 season. Over the first 25 games of the season, Snell started in all but four. However, on December 21, he was removed from the team's regular rotation and over the next three games, he was credited with a "DNP" in two of the three. With teammate Doug McDermott out injured on December 28 against the Toronto Raptors, Snell got his chance to re-establish himself in the rotation, coming off the bench to score an equal team-high 22 points on 8-of-14 shooting in 27 minutes of action, helping the Bulls defeat the Raptors 104–97.

=== Milwaukee Bucks (2016–2019) ===
On October 17, 2016, Snell was traded to the Milwaukee Bucks in exchange for Michael Carter-Williams. Entering the 2016-17 season, Snell was named as the starting shooting guard due to an injury suffered by Khris Middleton. After missing the Bucks' season-opener with a sprained left ankle, Snell made his debut for the team in their second game of the season on October 29, 2016, scoring six points in 21 minutes as a starter in a 110–108 win over the Brooklyn Nets. On December 26, 2016, he made a career-high six three-pointers and set a season high with 20 points in a 107–102 loss to the Washington Wizards. On February 24, 2017, in 28 minutes of play against the Utah Jazz, Snell recorded zero counting stats, falling just 22 seconds short of Joel Anthony's record for most playing time in a game without recording a point, rebound, assist, steal or block. On March 6, 2017, he had 18 of his season-high 21 in the first half of the Bucks' 112–98 win over the Philadelphia 76ers. He surpassed that mark on March 28 with a career-high 26 points in a 118–108 win over the Charlotte Hornets. On April 22, 2017, he set playoff career highs with 19 points and five 3-pointers in an 87–76 loss to the Toronto Raptors in Game 4 of their first-round playoff series; the loss tied the series at 2–2.

On July 31, 2017, Snell re-signed with the Bucks to a four-year, $44 million contract. The deal reportedly includes a player option after the third year and reachable incentives that would push his total earnings to $46 million. On March 23, 2018, he matched his season high with 18 points in a 118–105 win over the Chicago Bulls.

=== Detroit Pistons (2019–2020) ===
On June 20, 2019, Snell was traded, along with the draft rights to Kevin Porter Jr., to the Detroit Pistons in exchange for Jon Leuer.

=== Atlanta Hawks (2020–2021) ===
On November 20, 2020, Snell and Khyri Thomas were traded to the Atlanta Hawks in exchange for Dewayne Dedmon. On March 11, 2021, Snell made a game-winning three-pointer at the buzzer to give the Hawks a 121–120 victory over the Toronto Raptors, capping off a 15-point fourth-quarter comeback.

=== Portland Trail Blazers (2021–2022) ===
On August 10, 2021, the Portland Trail Blazers announced that they had signed Snell.

=== New Orleans Pelicans (2022) ===
On February 8, 2022, Portland traded Snell, Larry Nance Jr. and CJ McCollum to the New Orleans Pelicans in exchange for Josh Hart, Nickeil Alexander-Walker, Tomáš Satoranský, Didi Louzada, a protected 2022 first-round draft pick, the better of New Orleans' and Portland's 2026 second-round draft picks and New Orleans' 2027 second-round draft pick.

=== Maine Celtics (2023–2024) ===
On January 27, 2023, Snell was acquired by the Maine Celtics.

On August 8, 2023, the Golden State Warriors held a free agent workout with Snell. On October 29, he returned to Maine.

=== Sioux Falls Skyforce (2024–2025) ===
On October 2, 2024, Snell was traded to the Sioux Falls Skyforce.

=== Boulazac Basket Dordogne (2025–2026) ===
On August 23, 2025, Snell signed with Boulazac Basket Dordogne of the LNB Pro A. During the first part of the 2025–26 season, Snell established himself as one of the most efficient three-point shooters in Betclic Élite, ranking fourth in the league with a 50.9% three-point percentage after 16 games played. His long-range shooting was publicly praised by his head coach, who highlighted both his remarkable accuracy from beyond the arc and his overall impact on the team.

=== Cholet Basket (2026–present) ===
On June 18, 2026, Snell signed with Cholet Basket of LNB Pro A.

== Personal life ==
Snell met his wife, Ashley, at a barbecue hosted by his Chicago Bulls teammate Jimmy Butler. They have two sons who were both diagnosed with autism spectrum disorder.

On The Today Show on June 16, 2023, Snell revealed that he was diagnosed with autism spectrum disorder, after the evaluation of his eldest son helped to realize similarities with his own experience.

== Career statistics ==
Legend
GP	Games played	GS	Games started	MPG	Minutes per game
FG%	Field goal percentage	3P%	3-point field goal percentage	FT%	Free throw percentage
RPG	Rebounds per game	APG	Assists per game	SPG	Steals per game
BPG	Blocks per game	PPG	Points per game	**Bold**	Career high

=== NBA ===
==== Regular season ====
Year	Team	GP	GS	MPG	FG%	3P%	FT%	RPG	APG	SPG	BPG	PPG
2013–14	Chicago	77	12	16.0	.384	.320	.756	1.6	.9	.4	.2	4.5
2014–15	Chicago	72	22	19.6	.429	.371	.800	2.4	.9	.4	.2	6.0
2015–16	Chicago	64	33	20.3	.372	.361	.909	**3.1**	1.0	.3	.3	5.3
2016–17	Milwaukee	**80**	**80**	**29.2**	.455	.406	.810	**3.1**	1.2	**.7**	.2	**8.5**
2017–18	Milwaukee	75	59	27.4	.435	.403	.792	1.9	1.3	.6	**.4**	6.9
2018–19	Milwaukee	74	12	17.6	.452	.397	.881	2.1	.9	.3	.2	6.0
2019–20	Detroit	59	57	27.8	.445	.402	**1.000**	1.9	**2.2**	.5	.3	8.0
2020–21	Atlanta	47	23	21.1	**.515**	**.569**	**1.000**	2.4	1.3	.3	.2	5.3
2021–22	Portland	38	10	14.4	.371	.320	**1.000**	1.9	.5	.2	.2	2.6
2021–22	New Orleans	15	2	18.5	.446	.396	**1.000**	2.1	.5	.5	.1	5.9
Career		601	310	21.8	.431	.394	.846	2.3	1.1	.4	.2	6.1

==== Playoffs ====
Year	Team	GP	GS	MPG	FG%	3P%	FT%	RPG	APG	SPG	BPG	PPG
2014	Chicago	5	0	9.2	.222	.000	–	1.2	.4	**.2**	.2	.8
2015	Chicago	**11**	0	12.7	.341	.333	**1.000**	1.5	.5	.0	**.3**	3.9
2017	Milwaukee	6	**6**	**30.8**	**.500**	**.516**	–	**2.3**	**1.5**	**.2**	.2	**10.0**
2018	Milwaukee	7	2	19.1	.292	.238	–	1.9	.6	.4	.6	2.7
2019	Milwaukee	9	0	3.1	.333	.500	–	.2	.0	.1	.1	.6
2021	Atlanta	9	0	7.3	.125	.091	–	.6	.2	.2	.1	.6
Career		47	8	12.7	.350	.330	1.000	1.2	.5	.2	.2	2.9

=== College ===
Year	Team	GP	GS	MPG	FG%	3P%	FT%	RPG	APG	SPG	BPG	PPG
2010–11	New Mexico	34	7	17.5	.364	.345	.735	1.9	.9	.2	.2	4.4
2011–12	New Mexico	**35**	**35**	25.5	**.448**	.387	.831	**2.7**	2.3	.5	.4	10.5
2012–13	New Mexico	**35**	**35**	**31.2**	.422	**.390**	**.843**	2.6	**2.9**	**.8**	**.5**	**12.5**
Career		104	77	24.8	.421	.380	.821	2.1	2.0	.5	.3	7.4
