= 2012–13 Colorado State Rams men's basketball team =

American college basketball season

2012–13 Colorado State Rams men's basketball
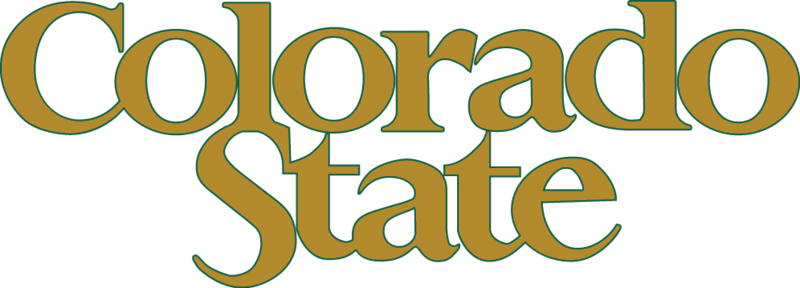

Las Vegas Classic Champions

NCAA tournament, Round of 32
- Conference: Mountain West Conference
- Record: 26–9 (11–5 Mountain West)
- Head coach: Larry Eustachy (1st season)
- Assistant coaches: Leonard Perry; Ross Hodge; Niko Medved
- Home arena: Moby Arena

2012–13 Mountain West Conference men's basketball standings
	Conf.				Overall
Team	W		L	PCT	W		L	PCT
No. 10 New Mexico †	13	–	3	.813	29	–	6	.829
Colorado State	11	–	5	.688	26	–	9	.743
UNLV	10	–	6	.625	25	–	10	.714
San Diego State	9	–	7	.563	23	–	11	.676
Boise State	9	–	7	.563	21	–	11	.656
Air Force	8	–	8	.500	18	–	14	.563
Fresno State	5	–	11	.313	11	–	19	.367
Wyoming	4	–	12	.250	20	–	14	.588
Nevada	3	–	13	.188	12	–	19	.387
† 2013 MWC tournament winner Rankings from AP Poll

The 2012–13 Colorado State Rams men's basketball team represented Colorado State University during the 2012–13 NCAA Division I men's basketball season. The team was coached by Larry Eustachy in his first season. They played their home games at the Moby Arena on Colorado State University's main campus in Fort Collins, Colorado and were a member of the Mountain West Conference. They finished with a record of 26–9 overall, 11–5 in Mountain West for a second-place finish. They lost in the semifinals of the Mountain West tournament to UNLV. They received an at-large bid to the 2013 NCAA tournament, where they defeated Missouri in the second round before losing to Louisville in the third round.

== Departures ==
Name	Number	Pos.	Height	Weight	Year	Hometown	Reason for departure
Cody Mann	0	G	6'0"	160	Freshman	Miami, FL	Transferred
Kaipo Sabas	15	G	5'11"	177	Senior	Fort Collins, CO	Graduated
Will Bell	23	F	6'6"	242	Senior	Colorado Springs, CO	Graduated

== Recruiting ==
College recruiting
Name	Hometown	School	Height	Weight	Commit date
Jordan Mason; SG	Ennis, TX	Ennis High School	6 ft 2 in (1.88 m)	175 lb (79 kg)	Oct 17, 2011
Jordan Mason; SG	Recruit ratings: Scout: Rivals: (N/A)				
Jonathan Octeus; PG	Miramar, FL	Wabash Valley College	6 ft 4 in (1.93 m)	175 lb (79 kg)	Apr 27, 2012
Jonathan Octeus; PG	Recruit ratings: Scout: Rivals: (N/A)				
Gerson Santo; PF	Valencia, BRA	College of Southern Idaho	6 ft 9 in (2.06 m)	210 lb (95 kg)	Apr 23, 2011
Gerson Santo; PF	Recruit ratings: Scout: Rivals: (N/A)				
Overall recruit ranking: Scout: – Rivals: –
Note: In many cases, Scout, Rivals, 247Sports, On3, and ESPN may conflict in their listings of height and weight.; In these cases, the average was taken. ESPN grades are on a 100-point scale.; Sources: "Colorado State Commit List for 2012". Rivals.; "Men's Basketball Recruiting". Scout.; "ESPN – Colorado State Rams Basketball Recruiting 2012". ESPN.; "Scout.com Team Recruiting Rankings". Scout.; "2012 Team Ranking". Rivals.

== Roster ==
2012–13 Colorado State Rams men's basketball team
Players
Coaches

Pos.	#	Name	Height	Weight	Year	Previous school	Hometown
G	2	Daniel Bejarano	6 ft 4 in (1.93 m)	202 lb (92 kg)	RS So	Arizona	Phoenix, AZ
F	4	Pierce Hornung	6 ft 5 in (1.96 m)	210 lb (95 kg)	RS Sr	Iowa State	Fremont, NE
G	5	Jonathan Octeus	6 ft 4 in (1.93 m)	170 lb (77 kg)	RS So	Wabash Valley College	Miramar, FL
G	10	Wes Eikmeier	6 ft 3 in (1.91 m)	168 lb (76 kg)	RS Sr	Iowa State	Fremont, NE
G	11	Jesse Carr	6 ft 2 in (1.88 m)	184 lb (83 kg)	RS Sr	Ainsworth HS	Ainsworth, NE
G	12	Joe De Ciman	6 ft 4 in (1.93 m)	185 lb (84 kg)	Fr	Dr. Martin LeBoldus HS	Regina, SK
G	14	Jordan Mason	6 ft 2 in (1.88 m)	175 lb (79 kg)	Fr	Ennis HS	Ennis, TX
F	15	Gerson Santo	6 ft 9 in (2.06 m)	210 lb (95 kg)	Jr	College of Southern Idaho	Valencia, BRA
G	22	Dorian Green	6 ft 2 in (1.88 m)	192 lb (87 kg)	Sr	Lawrence HS	Lawrence, KS
G	30	Josh Morgan	6 ft 2 in (1.88 m)	172 lb (78 kg)	RS So	Hawaii-Hilo	Buena Vista, CO
G	33	Dwight Smith	6 ft 4 in (1.93 m)	185 lb (84 kg)	Jr	Ralston HS	Omaha, NE
G	40	Stephon Wynn	5 ft 6 in (1.68 m)	160 lb (73 kg)	RS Jr	Fountain-Fort Carson HS	St. Louis, MO
F	44	Greg Smith	6 ft 6 in (1.98 m)	221 lb (100 kg)	Sr	Ralston HS	Omaha, NE
F/C	45	Colton Iverson	7 ft 0 in (2.13 m)	255 lb (116 kg)	RS Sr	Minnesota	Yankton, SD

Head coach

- Larry Eustachy (Long Beach State)

Assistant coach(es)

- Leonard Perry (Idaho)
- Ross Hodge (East Texas A&M)
- Niko Medved (Minnesota)

Legend

- (C) Team captain
- (S) Suspended
- (I) Ineligible
- (W) Walk-on
- Injured
- Current redshirt

Roster
Last update: 2013-01-12

== 2012–13 schedule and results ==
Date time, TV	Rank^{#}	Opponent^{#}	Result	Record	Site (attendance) city, state
Exhibition
10/28/2012*; 2:00 pm		Metro State	W 87–67	–	Moby Arena (3,141); Fort Collins, CO
Regular season
11/09/2012*; 7:00 pm		Montana	W 72–65	1–0	Moby Arena (5,833); Fort Collins, CO
11/15/2012*; 7:00 pm		Chadron State	W 93–50	2–0	Moby Arena (3,066); Fort Collins, CO
11/21/2012*; 7:00 pm, RTRM		at Denver	W 60–53	3–0	Magness Arena (4,883); Denver, CO
11/24/2012*; 5:30 pm, P12N		at Washington	W 73–55	4–0	Alaska Airlines Arena (7,409); Seattle, WA
11/26/2012*; 7:00 pm		Northern Colorado	W 85–69	5–0	Moby Arena (3,622); Fort Collins, CO
12/01/2012*; 2:30 pm		Evansville; MWC–MVC Challenge	W 79–72	6–0	Moby Arena (3,970); Fort Collins, CO
12/05/2012*; 8:30 pm, P12N		at Colorado	L 61–70	6–1	Coors Events Center (11,708); Boulder, CO
12/08/2012*; 2:00 pm, ALT		at UIC	L 55–64	6–2	UIC Pavilion (3,380); Chicago, IL
12/17/2012*; 7:00 pm		North Florida; Continental Tire Las Vegas Classic	W 83–55	7–2	Moby Arena (3,556); Fort Collins, CO
12/19/2012*; 7:00 pm		Cal State Bakersfield; Continental Tire Las Vegas Classic	W 78–58	8–2	Moby Arena (2,896); Fort Collins, CO
12/22/2012*; 8:45 pm		vs. Portland; Continental Tire Las Vegas Classic Semifinals	W 70–53	9–2	Orleans Arena (N/A); Paradise, NV
12/23/2012*; 9:30 pm, CBSSN		vs. Virginia Tech; Continental Tire Las Vegas Classic Championship	W 88–52	10–2	Orleans Arena (N/A); Paradise, NV
12/29/2012*; 2:30 pm		Adams State	W 80–55	11–2	Moby Arena (3,669); Fort Collins, CO
01/02/2013*; 8:00 pm, CBSSN		UTEP	W 62–58	12–2	Moby Arena (3,571); Fort Collins, CO
01/05/2013*; 2:30 pm		St. Bonaventure	W 85–64	13–2	Moby Arena (3,922); Fort Collins, CO
01/12/2013; 6:00 pm, NBCSN		at No. 16 San Diego State	L 72–79 ^{OT}	13–3 (0–1)	Viejas Arena (12,414); San Diego, CA
01/16/2013; 7:00 pm		Air Force	W 79–40	14–3 (1–1)	Moby Arena (4,347); Fort Collins, CO
01/19/2013; 5:00 pm, NBCSN		UNLV	W 66–61	15–3 (2–1)	Moby Arena (7,626); Fort Collins, CO
01/23/2013; 6:00 pm, CBSSN		at No. 15 New Mexico	L 61–66	15–4 (2–2)	The Pit (15,411); Albuquerque, NM
01/26/2013; 8:00 pm		at Fresno State	W 74–63	16–4 (3–2)	Save Mart Center (8,103); Fresno, CA
01/30/2013; 7:00 pm		Boise State	W 77–57	17–4 (4–2)	Moby Arena (6,059); Fort Collins, CO
02/02/2013; 5:00 pm, RTRM		Wyoming	W 65–46	18–4 (5–2)	Moby Arena (8,745); Fort Collins, CO
02/06/2013; 8:15 pm, CBSSN		at Nevada	W 73–69	19–4 (6–2)	Lawlor Events Center (6,226); Reno, NV
02/13/2013; 8:00 pm, CBSSN	No. 24	San Diego State	W 66–60	20–4 (7–2)	Moby Arena (8,745); Fort Collins, CO
02/16/2013; 2:00 pm, ALT	No. 24	at Air Force	W 89–86	21–4 (8–2)	Clune Arena (5,862); Colorado Springs, CO
02/20/2013; 8:15 pm, CBSSN	No. 22	at UNLV	L 59–61	21–5 (8–3)	Thomas & Mack Center (15,910); Paradise, NV
02/23/2013; 2:00 pm, NBCSN	No. 22	No. 16 New Mexico	L 82–91	21–6 (8–4)	Moby Arena (8,745); Fort Collins, CO
02/27/2013; 7:00 pm		Fresno State	W 74–67	22–6 (9–4)	Moby Arena (5,371); Fort Collins, CO
03/02/2013; 6:00 pm		at Boise State	L 65–78	22–7 (9–5)	Taco Bell Arena (11,238); Boise, ID
03/06/2013; 8:00 pm, RTRM		at Wyoming	W 78–56	23–7 (10–5)	Arena-Auditorium (6,803); Laramie, WY
03/09/2013; 6:30 pm, CBSSN		Nevada	W 77–66	24–7 (11–5)	Moby Arena (8,745); Fort Collins, CO
2013 Mountain West Conference men's basketball tournament
03/13/2013; 3:30 pm, CBSSN		vs. Fresno State; Quarterfinals	W 67–61	25–7	Thomas & Mack Center (9,122); Paradise, NV
03/15/2013; 9:30 pm, CBSSN		vs. UNLV; Semifinals	L 65–75	25–8	Thomas & Mack Center (18,500); Paradise, NV
2013 NCAA tournament
03/21/2013*; 7:34 pm, TBS	No. (8 MW)	vs. (9 MW) Missouri; Second Round	W 84–72	26–8	Rupp Arena (16,632); Lexington, KY
03/23/2013*; 3:15 pm, CBS	No. (8 MW)	vs. No. 2 (1 MW) Louisville; Third Round	L 56–82	26–9	Rupp Arena (23,500); Lexington, KY
*Non-conference game. ^{#}Rankings from AP Poll. (#) Tournament seedings in parentheses. All times are in Mountain Time. (#) during NCAA Tournament is seed with Region MW=Midwest.

== Rankings ==
Legend: ██ Increase in ranking. ██ Decrease in ranking.
Poll	Pre	Wk 2	Wk 3	Wk 4	Wk 5	Wk 6	Wk 7	Wk 8	Wk 9	Wk 10	Wk 11	Wk 12	Wk 13	Wk 14	Wk 15	Wk 16	Wk 17	Wk 18	Wk 19	Final
AP	RV	RV	NR	RV	RV	NR	NR	NR	NR	NR	NR	RV	RV	RV	24	22	RV	RV	RV	RV
Coaches	RV	RV	RV	RV	RV	NR	NR	RV	RV	RV	NR	RV	RV	RV	24	21	RV	RV	RV	RV

== See also ==
- 2012–13 NCAA Division I men's basketball season
- 2012–13 NCAA Division I men's basketball rankings
