= 2012–13 Boise State Broncos men's basketball team =

American college basketball season

2012–13 Boise State Broncos men's basketball

NCAA Tournament, First Four
- Conference: Mountain West Conference
- Record: 21–11 (9–7 MW)
- Head coach: Leon Rice (3rd season)
- Assistant coaches: Dave Wojcik (3rd season); Jeff Linder (3rd season); John Rillie (2nd season)
- Home arena: Taco Bell Arena

2012–13 Mountain West Conference men's basketball standings
	Conf.				Overall
Team	W		L	PCT	W		L	PCT
No. 10 New Mexico †	13	–	3	.813	29	–	6	.829
Colorado State	11	–	5	.688	26	–	9	.743
UNLV	10	–	6	.625	25	–	10	.714
San Diego State	9	–	7	.563	23	–	11	.676
Boise State	9	–	7	.563	21	–	11	.656
Air Force	8	–	8	.500	18	–	14	.563
Fresno State	5	–	11	.313	11	–	19	.367
Wyoming	4	–	12	.250	20	–	14	.588
Nevada	3	–	13	.188	12	–	19	.387
† 2013 MWC tournament winner Rankings from AP Poll

The 2012–13 Boise State Broncos men's basketball team represented Boise State University during the 2012–13 NCAA Division I men's basketball season. The Broncos, led by third year head coach Leon Rice, played their home games at Taco Bell Arena and were a member of the Mountain West Conference. They finished the season 21–11, 9–7 in Mountain West play to finish in a tie for fourth place. They lost in the quarterfinals of the Mountain West tournament to San Diego State. They received an at-large bid to the NCAA tournament, the school's first ever at-large bid, where they lost in the First Four round to La Salle.

== Roster ==
Number	Name	Position	Height	Weight	Year	Hometown
0	Ryan Watkins	Forward	6–8	229	Junior	Santa Clarita, California
1	Mikey Thompson	Guard	6–3	167	RS Freshman	Las Vegas, Nevada
2	Derrick Marks	Guard	6–3	206	Sophomore	Joliet, Illinois
3	Anthony Drmic	Guard/Forward	6–6	196	Sophomore	Endeavour Hills, Victoria, Australia
5	Joe Hanstad	Guard	6–4	193	Sophomore	Dickinson, North Dakota
11	Jeff Elorriaga	Guard	6–2	180	Junior	Portland, Oregon
12	Igor Hadziomerovic	Guard	6–4	202	Sophomore	Melbourne, Australia
14	Vukasin Vujovic	Forward	6–9	220	Freshman	Belgrade, Serbia
15	Thomas Bropleh	Forward	6–5	203	Junior	Denver, Colorado
20	Joey Nebeker	Forward	6–7	222	Freshman	Melba, Idaho
21	Edmunds Dukulis	Forward	6–9	225	Freshman	Riga, Latvia
24	Darrious Hamilton	Forward	6–8	222	Freshman	San Antonio, Texas
34	Jake Ness	Forward	6–8	214	Sophomore	Coeur d'Alene, Idaho
42	Kenny Buckner	Center	6–7	251	Senior	Washington, D.C.

== Schedule ==
On August 10, the Mountain West announced the conference schedule and Boise State also announced a few confirmed non conference games. The full schedule was released on August 17.

Date time, TV	Rank^{#}	Opponent^{#}	Result	Record	Site (attendance) city, state
Exhibition
11/02/2012*; 7:30 pm		Saint Martin's	W 75–55	–	Taco Bell Arena (2,258); Boise, ID
Regular season
11/11/2012*; 2:00 pm		Texas Southern	W 81–63	1–0	Taco Bell Arena (1,950); Boise, ID
11/13/2012*; 7:30 pm		Oakland	W 88–80	2–0	Taco Bell Arena (2,616); Boise, ID
11/18/2012*; 1:00 pm		Louisiana–Lafayette	W 63–57	3–0	Taco Bell Arena (2,882); Boise, ID
11/20/2012*; 6:00 pm, BTN		at No. 15 Michigan State	L 70–74	3–1	Breslin Center (14,797); East Lansing, MI
11/24/2012*; 2:00 pm		UC Santa Barbara	W 72–56	4–1	Taco Bell Arena (3,300); Boise, ID
11/28/2012*; 6:00 pm, ESPN3		at No. 11 Creighton; MWC–MVC Challenge	W 83–70	5–1	CenturyLink Center Omaha (16,364); Omaha, NE
12/02/2012*; 3:00 pm		at Seattle	W 87–64	6–1	KeyArena (2,182); Seattle, WA
12/05/2012*; 6:30 pm, P12N		at Utah	L 55–76	6–2	Jon M. Huntsman Center (7,896); Salt Lake City, UT
12/14/2012*; 7:15 pm		LSU	W 89–70	7–2	Taco Bell Arena (11,210); Boise, ID
12/20/2012*; 7:00 pm		vs. Idaho	W 78–68	8–2	CenturyLink Arena (5,548); Boise, ID
12/23/2012*; 2:00 pm		vs. New Orleans; MGM Grand Garden Classic	W 67–51	9–2	MGM Grand Garden Arena (732); Paradise, NV
12/30/2012*; 2:00 pm		Corban	W 105–49	10–2	Taco Bell Arena (3,785); Boise, ID
01/02/2013*; 6:00 pm		at Texas–Arlington	W 64–46	11–2	College Park Center (1,107); Arlington, TX
01/05/2013*; 7:00 pm		Walla Walla	W 106–39	12–2	Taco Bell Arena (5,033); Boise, ID
01/09/2013; 8:00 pm, RTNW		at Wyoming	W 63–61	13–2 (1–0)	Arena-Auditorium (6,416); Laramie, WY
01/16/2013; 7:00 pm, RTNW		No. 19 New Mexico	L 74–79 ^{OT}	13–3 (1–1)	Taco Bell Arena (10,420); Boise, ID
01/19/2013; 2:00 pm		at Air Force	L 80–91	13–4 (1–2)	Clune Arena (3,029); Colorado Springs, CO
01/23/2013; 6:00 pm		Fresno State	W 74–67	14–4 (2–2)	Taco Bell Arena (4,862); Boise, ID
01/26/2013; 2:00 pm		at Nevada	L 59–75	14–5 (2–3)	Lawlor Events Center (6,821); Reno, NV
01/30/2013; 7:00 pm		at Colorado State	L 57–77	14–6 (2–4)	Moby Arena (6,059); Fort Collins, CO
02/02/2013; 7:00 pm, TWCSN		UNLV	W 77–72	15–6 (3–4)	Taco Bell Arena (9,356); Boise, ID
02/06/2013; 9:00 pm, TWCSN		at San Diego State	L 62–63	15–7 (3–5)	Viejas Arena (12,414); San Diego, CA
02/09/2013; 6:00 pm		Wyoming	W 68–61	16–7 (4–5)	Taco Bell Arena (8,127); Boise, ID
02/16/2013; 7:00 pm, RTNW		at No. 19 New Mexico	L 50–60	16–8 (4–6)	The Pit (15,411); Albuquerque, NM
02/20/2013; 6:00 pm		Air Force	W 77–65	17–8 (5–6)	Taco Bell Arena (4,953); Boise, ID
02/23/2013; 8:00 pm		at Fresno State	W 72–63	18–8 (6–6)	Save Mart Center (8,267); Fresno, CA
02/27/2013; 6:00 pm		Nevada	W 73–47	19–8 (7–6)	Taco Bell Arena (5,717); Boise, ID
03/02/2013; 6:00 pm		Colorado State	W 78–65	20–8 (8–6)	Taco Bell Arena (11,238); Boise, ID
03/05/2013; 8:00 pm, TWCSN		at UNLV	L 64–68	20–9 (8–7)	Thomas & Mack Center (15,295); Paradise, NV
03/09/2013; 1:30 pm, NBCSN		San Diego State	W 69–65	21–9 (9–7)	Taco Bell Arena (10,455); Boise, ID
2013 Mountain West tournament
03/13/2013; 10:00 pm, CBSSN	(5)	vs. (4) San Diego State; Quarterfinals	L 67–73	21–10	Thomas & Mack Center (13,297); Paradise, NV
2013 NCAA tournament
03/20/2013*; 7:10 pm, truTV	(13 W)	vs. (13 W) La Salle; First Four	L 71–80	21–11	UD Arena (12,218); Dayton, OH
*Non-conference game. ^{#}Rankings from AP Poll. (#) Tournament seedings in parentheses. All times are in Mountain Time. (#) during NCAA Tournament is seed with Region W=West.

== Season notes ==
Boise State's win over #11 Creighton on November 28 is the highest ranked team Boise State has ever beaten in program history. The previous highest ranked team they defeated was #15 Washington in 1998. Following the win over Creighton, the Broncos began to receive votes in both the AP and Coaches polls. Their win over LSU on December 14 was Boise State's first win ever against a team from the SEC. On December 30, Jr. Jeff Elorriaga set a Boise State and Mountain West record by making 10 3-pointers in a win against Corban. With 30 points against Corban, Elorriaga became the third Bronco this season to score 30 or more points (Marks 35 vs Creighton, Drmic 34 vs LSU). It is the first time in school history that three different Broncos have scored 30 points in a game during the same season. The 67-point win over Walla Walla on January 5 was the largest margin of victory in school history. The Broncos set a school record with 12 non-conference wins. On January 9, leading scorer Derrick Marks along with Mikey Thompson, Kenny Buckner and Darrious Hamilton were suspended for violation of team rules for the Mountain West opener vs Wyoming. The Broncos only played 7 players and won the game by 2. On January 23 vs Fresno State, the Broncos went 26 for 26 at the line to set a new school and Mountain West record for most made free throws without a miss. The previous conference record was 23 for 23 set by Colorado State in 2011–12. Derrick Marks and Anthony Drmic were selected for the Mountain All-Conference 2nd team. Their berth in the NCAA Tournament is the school's sixth overall appearance, first since 2008, and first at-large berth ever.

== Team statistics ==
Final season stats.
Retrieved from Broncosports.com

Name	GP–GS	MPG	PTS	PPG	FG %	3P %	FT %	AST	REB	BLK	STL
Anthony Drmic	32–32	32.1	565	17.7	.464	.392	.777	74	147	8	20
Derrick Marks	31–31	30.1	504	16.3	.466	.423	.837	122	118	14	56
Jeff Elorriaga	29–29	33.9	296	10.2	.444	.447	.719	64	98	0	37
Ryan Watkins	32–31	21.3	269	8.4	.617	.500	.719	14	217	12	19
Mikey Thompson	30–6	25.9	238	7.9	.384	.439	.701	41	71	1	17
Igor Hadziomerovic	29–26	25.8	152	5.2	.364	.254	.615	59	86	6	24
Kenny Buckner	29–3	18.1	149	5.1	.634	.000	.553	13	151	7	15
Thomas Bropleh	30–0	13.1	106	3.5	.382	.300	.684	20	56	1	8
Joe Hanstad	22–2	8.5	31	1.4	.417	.333	.750	15	11	1	10
Vukasin Vujovic	9–0	4.0	11	1.2	.231	.200	1.000	0	4	1	0
Darrious Hamilton	16–0	4.6	17	1.1	.417	.000	.583	1	19	1	3
Jake Ness	14–0	4.9	5	0.4	.000	.000	.833	0	10	2	3
TEAM	32		2,243	73.2	.460	.391	.747	423	1,081	54	212
Opponents	32		2,095	65.5	.437	.338	.706	401	944	93	185

== Gallery ==
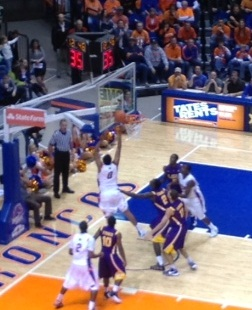
Ryan Watkins tip vs LSU on December 14.

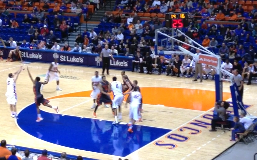
Joe Hansted attempts a 3 vs Walla Walla on January 5.

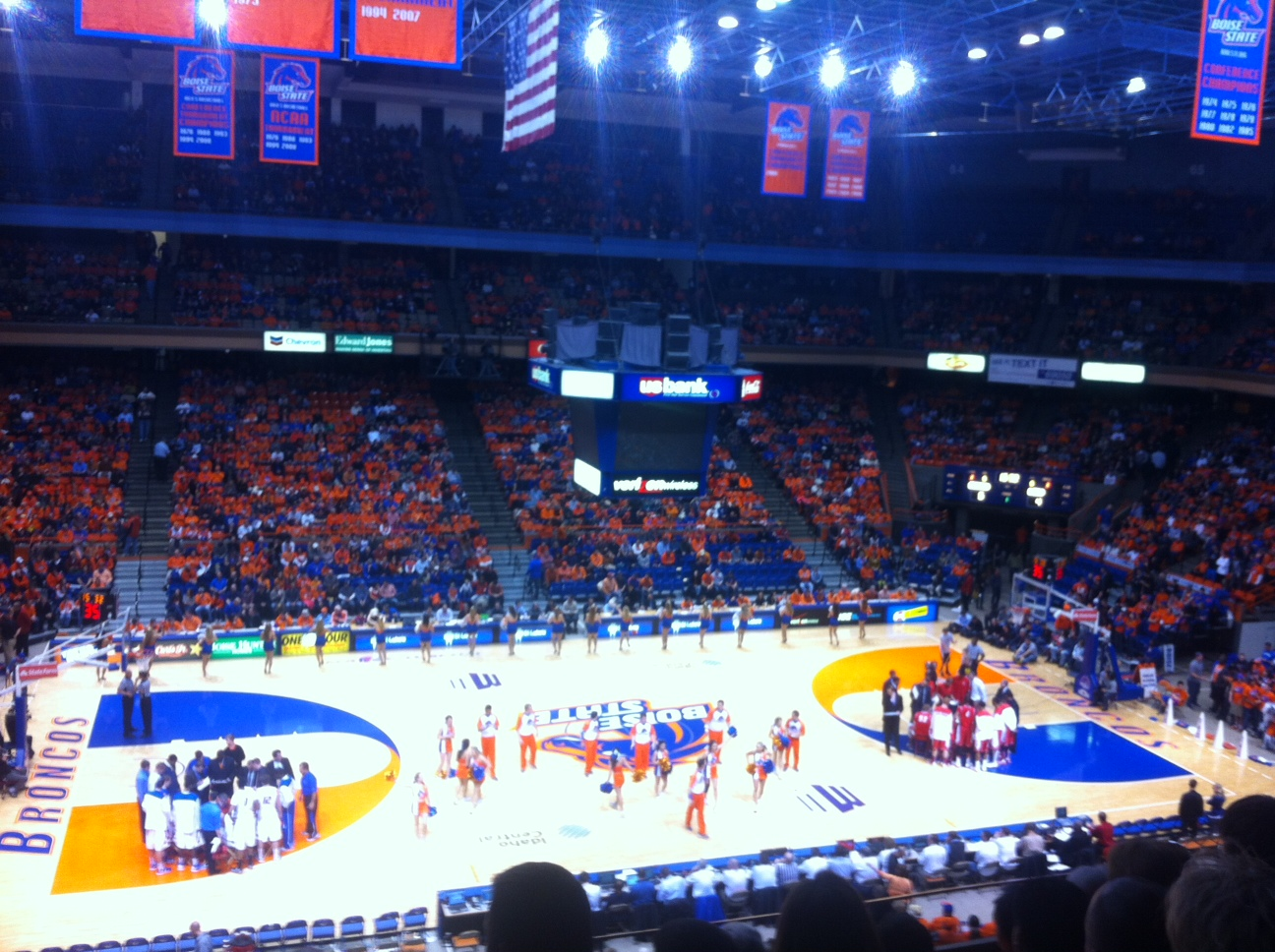
Boise State vs New Mexico on January 16.

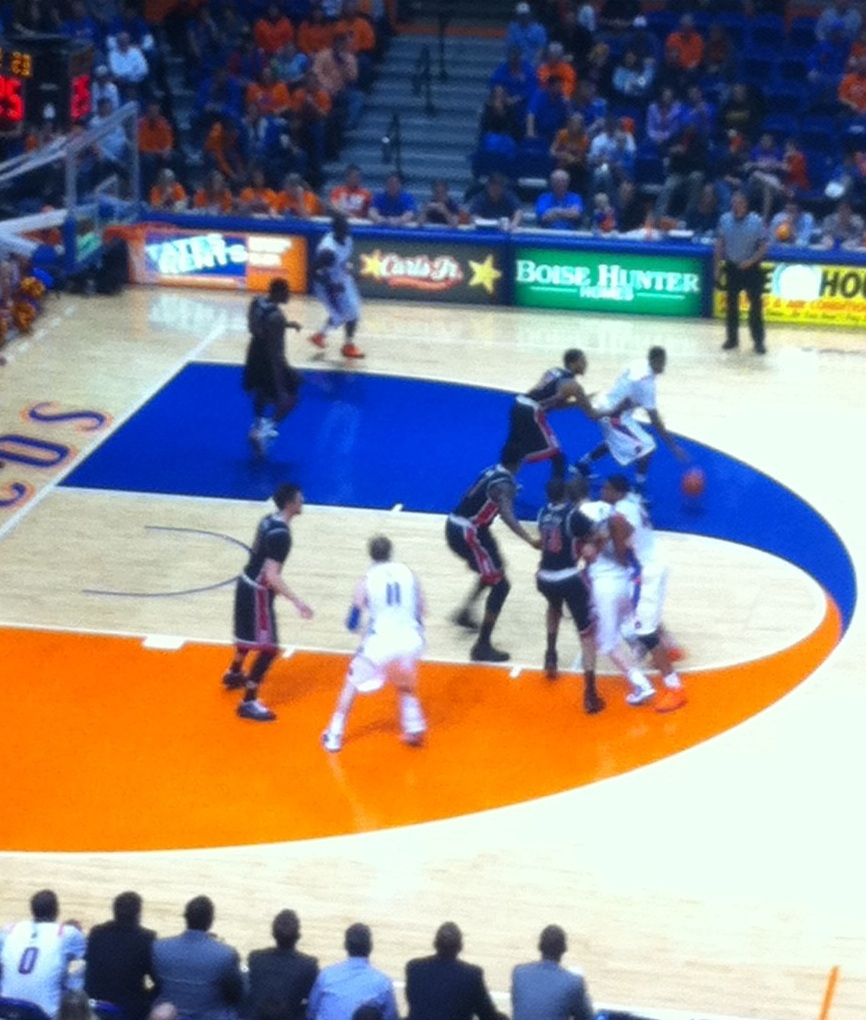
Boise on Offense vs UNLV on February 2.
