= 2012–13 Air Force Falcons men's basketball team =

American college basketball season

2012–13 Air Force Falcons men's basketball

CIT, Second Round
- Conference: Mountain West Conference
- Record: 18–14 (8–8 Mountain West)
- Head coach: Dave Pilipovich (1st season)
- Assistant coaches: Steve Snell; Silvey Dominguez; Drew Long; Tom Bellairs
- Home arena: Clune Arena

2012–13 Mountain West Conference men's basketball standings
	Conf.				Overall
Team	W		L	PCT	W		L	PCT
No. 10 New Mexico †	13	–	3	.813	29	–	6	.829
Colorado State	11	–	5	.688	26	–	9	.743
UNLV	10	–	6	.625	25	–	10	.714
San Diego State	9	–	7	.563	23	–	11	.676
Boise State	9	–	7	.563	21	–	11	.656
Air Force	8	–	8	.500	18	–	14	.563
Fresno State	5	–	11	.313	11	–	19	.367
Wyoming	4	–	12	.250	20	–	14	.588
Nevada	3	–	13	.188	12	–	19	.387
† 2013 MWC tournament winner Rankings from AP Poll

The 2012–13 Air Force Falcons men's basketball team represented the United States Air Force Academy in the 2012–13 NCAA Division I men's basketball season. Led by first-year head coach Dave Pilipovich, they played their home games at Clune Arena on the Air Force Academy's main campus in Colorado Springs, Colorado. They finished the season 18–14, with an 8–8 record in Mountain West play, finishing in sixth place. They lost in the quarterfinals of the Mountain West tournament to UNLV. They were invited to the 2013 CollegeInsider.com Postseason Tournament where they defeated Hawaiʻi in the first round before losing in the second round to Weber State.

== Roster ==
#	Name	Height	Weight (lbs.)	Class	Position	Hometown	Previous school
0	Marek Olesinski	6–8	216	Sophomore	Forward	Roswell, NM	USAFA Prep School
1	Tre Coggins	6–2	185	Freshman	Guard	San Juan, Capistrano, CA	USAFA Prep School
3	Justin Hammonds	6–6	190	Sophomore	Forward	Houston, TX	Richland HS
4	Kamryn Williams	6–4	195	Sophomore	Forward	Colorado Springs, CO	USAFA Prep School
5	Mike Fitzgerald	6–6	215	Senior	Forward	Centerville, MN	St. Thomas Academy
10	Todd Fletcher	6–2	183	Senior	Guard	Lee's Summit, MO	Lee's Summit West HS
12	Scott Adler	6–4	190	Sophomore	Guard	Las Cruces, NM	USAFA Prep School
13	Sherman Vernon	6–7	235	Freshman	Forward	Lompoc, CA	USAFA Prep School
14	Michael Lyons	6–5	193	Senior	Guard	Newport News, VA	Massanutten Military Acad.
15	Cam Michael	6–5	185	Freshman	Guard	Loveland, CO	USAFA Prep School
21	DeLovell Earls	6–5	220	Sophomore	Guard	Colorado Springs, CO	USAFA Prep School
22	Max Yon	6–4	195	Sophomore	Guard	San Antonio, TX	Ronald Reagan HS
23	Marshall Leipprandt	6–6	205	Freshman	Forward	Ubly, MI	Ubly HS
24	Alex LaLonde	6–5	175	Freshman	Guard	Wooster, OH	USAFA Prep School
25	Kyle Green	6–2	182	Senior	Guard	Richland Hills, TX	Richland
32	Daniel Salomon	6–9	205	Freshman	Center	Saint Petersburg, FL	USAFA Prep School
33	Conner Litt	6–8	215	Freshman	Forward/Center	Lancaster, OH	USAFA Prep School
34	Taylor Broekhuis	6–10	220	Senior	Center	Colorado Springs, CO	Colorado Springs Christian School
41	Zach Moer	6–10	220	Freshman	Forward	Dallas, TX	USAFA Prep School
42	Ethan Michael	6–8	225	Sophomore	Forward	Toledo, OH	USAFA Prep School
44	Chase Kammerer	6–8	235	Junior	Forward	Montgomery, TX	St. Thomas HS
45	Phillip Mays	6–1	190	Freshman	Guard	Memphis, TN	USAFA Prep School

== Schedule and results ==
Date time, TV	Rank^{#}	Opponent^{#}	Result	Record	Site (attendance) city, state
Exhibition
11/04/2012*; 2:00 pm		Colorado Christian	W 64–53	–	Clune Arena (N/A); Colorado Springs, CO
Regular season
11/10/2012*; 12:00 pm		vs. Army; All-Military Classic semifinals	W 76–65	1–0	McAlister Field House (1,180); Charleston, SC
11/11/2012*; 2:00 pm		at The Citadel; All-Military Classic championship	W 77–70	2–0	McAlister Field House (N/A); Charleston, SC
11/15/2012*; 7:00 pm		Western State	W 102–68	3–0	Clune Arena (1,545); Colorado Springs, CO
11/18/2012*; 2:00 pm		Regis	W 83–43	4–0	Clune Arena (1,547); Colorado Springs, CO
11/21/2012*; 7:00 pm		Montana State	W 86–72	5–0	Clune Arena (1,851); Colorado Springs, CO
11/25/2012*; 6:00 pm, P12N		at No. 23 Colorado	L 74–89	5–1	Coors Events Center (10,607); Boulder, CO
11/28/2012*; 7:00 pm		Jackson State	W 76–47	6–1	Clune Arena (1,547); Colorado Springs, CO
12/02/2012*; 3:00 pm		Wichita State; MVC–MVC Challenge	L 69–72	6–2	Clune Arena (1,793); Colorado Springs, CO
12/08/2012*; 2:00 pm		Arkansas–Pine Bluff	W 65–49	7–2	Clune Arena (1,553); Colorado Springs, CO
12/22/2012*; 2:00 pm		at UC Riverside	W 61–53	8–2	Student Recreation Center (507); Riverside, CA
12/29/2012*; 2:30 pm, RTRM		vs. No. 14 Florida; Orange Bowl Basketball Classic	L 61–78	8–3	BB&T Center (12,779); Sunrise, FL
01/02/2013*; 5:00 pm		at Richmond	L 68–91	8–4	Robins Center (4,017); Richmond, VA
01/09/2013; 7:00 pm		Nevada	W 78–65	9–4 (1–0)	Clune Arena (1,856); Colorado Springs, CO
01/12/2013; 8:00 pm, TWCSN		at No. 24 UNLV	L 71–76 ^{OT}	9–5 (1–1)	Thomas & Mack Center (14,723); Las Vegas, NV
01/16/2013; 7:00 pm		at Colorado State	L 40–79	9–6 (1–2)	Moby Arena (4,347); Fort Collins, CO
01/19/2013; 2:00 pm		Boise State	W 91–80	10–6 (2–2)	Clune Arena (3,029); Colorado Springs, CO
01/23/2013*; 7:00 pm		New Orleans	W 90–48	11–6	Clune Arena (1,671); Colorado Springs, CO
01/26/2013; 8:00 pm, RTRM		at Wyoming	W 57–48	12–6 (3–2)	Arena-Auditorium (8,404); Laramie, WY
01/30/2013; 7:00 pm		Fresno State	W 62–50	13–6 (4–2)	Clune Arena (2,009); Colorado Springs, CO
02/02/2013; 1:00 pm, TWCSN		No. 22 San Diego State	W 70–67	14–6 (5–2)	Clune Arena (5,011); Colorado Springs, CO
02/06/2013; 7:00 pm, RTRM		at No. 15 New Mexico	L 58–81	14–7 (5–3)	The Pit (15,373); Albuquerque, NM
02/09/2013; 4:00 pm		at Nevada	L 69–74	14–8 (5–4)	Lawlor Events Center (6,673); Reno, NV
02/13/2013; 7:00 pm, TWCSN		UNLV	W 71–56	15–8 (6–4)	Clune Arena (2,553); Colorado Springs, CO
02/16/2013; 2:00 pm, ALT		No. 24 Colorado State	L 86–89	15–9 (6–5)	Clune Arena (5,862); Colorado Springs, CO
02/20/2013; 6:00 pm		at Boise State	L 65–77	15–10 (6–6)	Taco Bell Arena (4,953); Boise, ID
02/26/2013; 7:00 pm, RTRM		Wyoming	W 72–66	16–10 (7–6)	Clune Arena (2,119); Colorado Springs, CO
03/02/2013; 8:00 pm		at Fresno State	L 41–56	16–11 (7–7)	Save Mart Center (7,788); Fresno, CA
03/06/2013; 9:30 pm, TWCSN		at San Diego State	L 51–58	16–12 (7–8)	Viejas Arena (12,414); San Diego, CA
03/09/2013; 4:00 pm, ALT		No. 12 New Mexico	W 89–88	17–12 (8–8)	Clune Arena (6,117); Colorado Springs, CO
2013 Mountain West Conference men's basketball tournament
03/13/2013; 1:00 pm, CBSSN	(6)	vs. (3) UNLV; Quarterfinals	L 56–72	17–13	Thomas & Mack Center (9,122); Las Vegas, NV
2013 CIT
03/20/2013*; 11:00 pm		at Hawaiʻi; First Round	W 69–65	18–13	Stan Sheriff Center (3,544); Honolulu, HI
03/23/2013*; 7:00 pm		at Weber State; Second Round	L 57–78	18–14	Dee Events Center (6,113); Ogden, UT
*Non-conference game. ^{#}Rankings from AP Poll. (#) Tournament seedings in parentheses. All times are in Mountain Time.

== See also ==
- 2012–13 NCAA Division I men's basketball season
- 2012–13 NCAA Division I men's basketball rankings
