= 2013 Mountain West Conference men's basketball tournament =

- MWC Tournament logo
- Classification: Division I
- Season: 2012–13
- Teams: 9
- Site: Thomas & Mack Center; Paradise, NV
- Champions: New Mexico (3rd title)
- Winning coach: Steve Alford (2nd title)
- MVP: Tony Snell (New Mexico)
- Television: CBSSN, CBS

2012–13 Mountain West Conference men's basketball standings
| | Conf. | | | | Overall |
| Team | W | | L | PCT | W | | L | PCT |
|---|---|---|---|---|---|---|---|---|
| No. 10 New Mexico † | 13 | – | 3 | .813 | 29 | – | 6 | .829 |
| Colorado State | 11 | – | 5 | .688 | 26 | – | 9 | .743 |
| UNLV | 10 | – | 6 | .625 | 25 | – | 10 | .714 |
| San Diego State | 9 | – | 7 | .563 | 23 | – | 11 | .676 |
| Boise State | 9 | – | 7 | .563 | 21 | – | 11 | .656 |
| Air Force | 8 | – | 8 | .500 | 18 | – | 14 | .563 |
| Fresno State | 5 | – | 11 | .313 | 11 | – | 19 | .367 |
| Wyoming | 4 | – | 12 | .250 | 20 | – | 14 | .588 |
| Nevada | 3 | – | 13 | .188 | 12 | – | 19 | .387 |
† 2013 MWC tournament winner Rankings from AP Poll

The 2013 Mountain West Conference men's basketball tournament was a tournament played at the Thomas & Mack Center in Las Vegas, Nevada on March 12–15, 2013. With TCU departing for the Big 12, and Fresno State and Nevada joining the MWC, the MWC will have a 9 team tournament for 2013. As the tournament champion, New Mexico received the Mountain West Conference's automatic bid to the 2013 NCAA Tournament.

== Seeds ==
Teams are seeded by conference record, with a ties broken by record between the tied teams followed by record against the regular–season champion, if necessary.

| Seed | School | Conference | Overall | Tiebreaker |
|---|---|---|---|---|
| 1 | New Mexico (#12) | 13–3 | 26–5 | |
| 2 | Colorado State | 11–5 | 24–7 | |
| 3 | UNLV | 10–6 | 23–8 | |
| 4 | San Diego State | 9–7 | 21–9 | 1–1 vs BSU |
| 5 | Boise State | 9–7 | 21–9 | 1–1 vs SDSU |
| 6 | Air Force | 8–8 | 17–12 | |
| 7 | Fresno State | 5–11 | 11–18 | |
| 8 | Wyoming | 4–12 | 18–12 | |
| 9 | Nevada | 3–13 | 12–18 | |

== Schedule ==
| Game | Time* | Matchup^{#} | Television |
First round – Tuesday, March 12
| 1 | 5:00 pm | #8 Wyoming vs. #9 Nevada | |
Quarterfinals – Wednesday, March 13
| 2 | Noon | #3 UNLV vs. #6 Air Force | CBSSN |
| 3 | 2:30 pm | #2 Colorado State vs. #7 Fresno State | CBSSN |
| 4 | 6:30 pm | #1 New Mexico vs. #8 Wyoming | CBSSN |
| 5 | 9:00 pm | #4 San Diego State vs. #5 Boise State | CBSSN |
Semifinals – Friday, March 15
| 6 | 6:00 pm | #1 New Mexico vs. #4 San Diego State | CBSSN |
| 7 | 8:30 pm | #3 UNLV vs. #2 Colorado State | CBSSN |
Championship – Saturday, March 16
| 8 | 3:00 pm | #1 New Mexico vs. #3 UNLV | CBS |
*Game times in PT. #-Rankings denote tournament seeding.

== Bracket ==
First round Tuesday, March 12
8 | Wyoming | 85
9 | Nevada | 81

Quarterfinals; Wednesday, March 13; CBSSN
1 | #15 New Mexico | 59
8 | Wyoming | 46
4 | San Diego State | 73
5 | Boise State | 67
2 | Colorado State | 67
7 | Fresno State | 61
3 | UNLV | 72
6 | Air Force | 56

Semifinals; Friday, March 15; CBSSN
1 | #15 New Mexico | 60
4 | San Diego State | 50
2 | Colorado State | 65
3 | UNLV | 75

Championship; Saturday, March 16; CBS
1 | #15 New Mexico | 63
3 | UNLV | 56
