= 2012–13 Wyoming Cowboys basketball team =

American college basketball season

2012–13 Wyoming Cowboys basketball

CBI, Quarterfinals
- Conference: Mountain West Conference
- Record: 20–14 (4–12 Mountain West)
- Head coach: Larry Shyatt
- Assistant coaches: Scott Duncan; Jeremy Shyatt; Allen Edwards
- Home arena: Arena-Auditorium (Capacity: 15,028)

2012–13 Mountain West Conference men's basketball standings
	Conf.				Overall
Team	W		L	PCT	W		L	PCT
No. 10 New Mexico †	13	–	3	.813	29	–	6	.829
Colorado State	11	–	5	.688	26	–	9	.743
UNLV	10	–	6	.625	25	–	10	.714
San Diego State	9	–	7	.563	23	–	11	.676
Boise State	9	–	7	.563	21	–	11	.656
Air Force	8	–	8	.500	18	–	14	.563
Fresno State	5	–	11	.313	11	–	19	.367
Wyoming	4	–	12	.250	20	–	14	.588
Nevada	3	–	13	.188	12	–	19	.387
† 2013 MWC tournament winner Rankings from AP Poll

The 2012–13 Wyoming Cowboys basketball team represented the University of Wyoming during the 2012–2013 NCAA Division I men's basketball season. Their head coach was Larry Shyatt in his second year. They played their home games at the Arena-Auditorium in Laramie, Wyoming. The Cowboys were a member of the Mountain West Conference. They finished with a record of 20–14 overall, 4–12 in Mountain West play for an eighth-place finish. They lost in the quarterfinals to New Mexico in the Mountain West tournament. They were invited to the 2013 College Basketball Invitational where they defeated Lehigh in the first round before losing in the quarterfinals to Western Michigan.

== Roster ==
2012–13 Wyoming Cowboys men's basketball team
Players
Coaches

Pos.	#	Name	Height	Weight	Year	Previous school	Hometown
F	0	Leonard Washington	6 ft 7 in (2.01 m)	230 lb (104 kg)	RS Sr	USC	Lake Charles, LA
G	1	Derrious Gilmore	5 ft 10 in (1.78 m)	170 lb (77 kg)	Sr	Jones County Junior College	Baltimore, MD
G	2	Riley Grabau	6 ft 2 in (1.88 m)	170 lb (77 kg)	So	Boulder High School	Boulder, CO
G	3	Aaron Tyser	6 ft 4 in (1.93 m)	200 lb (91 kg)	RS Fr	Sheridan College	Buffalo, WY
F	11	Derek Cooke, Jr.	6 ft 9 in (2.06 m)	210 lb (95 kg)	So	Cloud County CC	Washington, D.C.
G	13	Jack Bentz	6 ft 1 in (1.85 m)	175 lb (79 kg)	So	University School	Chagrin Falls, OH
G	14	Josh Adams	6 ft 2 in (1.88 m)	175 lb (79 kg)	Fr	Chaparral HS	Parker, CO
G	20	Nathan Sobey	6 ft 4 in (1.93 m)	185 lb (84 kg)	Jr	Cochise College	Warrnambool, Australia
F	21	Austin Haldorson	6 ft 9 in (2.06 m)	190 lb (86 kg)	Fr	Highlands Ranch HS	Highlands Ranch, CO
F	22	Larry Nance Jr.	6 ft 8 in (2.03 m)	210 lb (95 kg)	So	Revere High School	Richfield, OH
G	23	Jason McManamen	6 ft 5 in (1.96 m)	180 lb (82 kg)	Fr	Torrington HS	Torrington, WY
G	25	Luke Martinez	6 ft 4 in (1.93 m)	190 lb (86 kg)	RS Sr	Williston State College	Bismarck, ND
G	32	Charles Hankerson Jr.	6 ft 5 in (1.96 m)	220 lb (100 kg)	Jr	Alabama	Miami, FL
C	43	Matt Sellers	6 ft 10 in (2.08 m)	250 lb (113 kg)	So	Western Wyoming CC	Champlin, MN

Head coach

- Larry Shyatt (Wooster)

Assistant coach(es)

- Scott Duncan (Wooster)
- Allen Edwards (Kentucky)
- Jeremy Shyatt (Clemson)

Legend

- (C) Team captain
- (S) Suspended
- (I) Ineligible
- (W) Walk-on
- Injured
- Current redshirt

== Statistics ==
Player	GP	GS	MPG	FG%	3FG%	FT%	RPG	APG	SPG	BPG	PPG
Josh Adams	34	26	28.9	.346	.226	.637	1.4	1.6	0.8	0.2	6.6
Jack Bentz	21	0	5.2	.289	.000	.385	0.6	0.4	0.1	0.0	0.9
Derek Cooke Jr.	34	2	13.0	.529	.000	.333	3.8	0.2	0.2	0.3	3.1
Derrious Gilmore	34	34	34.2	.370	.367	.784	1.7	2.9	1.2	0.1	12.4
Riley Grabau	32	30	30.8	.352	.323	.740	1.0	2.5	0.3	0.0	6.0
Austin Haldorson	26	0	5.4	.393	.333	1.000	0.8	0.1	0.2	0.1	1.1
Luke Martinez	12	12	30.5	.454	.422	.861	3.0	1.5	2.1	0.2	14.5
Jason McManamen	19	1	7.0	.391	.333	.875	0.5	0.2	0.2	0.0	1.6
Larry Nance Jr.	33	33	32.0	.533	.345	.750	6.9	1.2	1.3	0.7	10.7
Matt Sellers	11	0	5.1	.353	.000	.000	0.9	0.3	0.1	0.3	1.1
Nathan Sobey	33	0	13.3	.423	.419	.647	1.0	0.7	0.3	0.1	3.5
Aaron Tyser	4	0	1.3	.000	.000	.000	0.5	0.0	0.0	0.0	0.0
Leonard Washington	32	32	30.4	.484	.159	.637	8.2	1.7	1.3	1.7	12.5

== Schedule and results ==
Date time, TV	Rank^{#}	Opponent^{#}	Result	Record	Site (attendance) city, state
Exhibition
10/31/2012*; 7:00 pm		vs. Fort Lewis	W 82–61	–	Wyoming Indian HS (1,100); Ethete, WY
11/03/2012*; 7:30 pm		Wooster	W 61–46	–	Arena-Auditorium (5,113); Laramie, WY
Regular season
11/10/2012*; 8:00 pm		Western State	W 62–42	1–0	Arena-Auditorium (5,137); Laramie, WY
11/14/2012*; 7:00 pm		NC Central; Global Hoops Showcase	W 73–60	2–0	Arena-Auditorium (4,463); Laramie, WY
11/15/2012*; 7:00 pm		South Dakota; Global Hoops Showcase	W 71–51	3–0	Arena-Auditorium (4,747); Laramie, WY
11/16/2012*; 8:00 pm		Southern; Global Hoops Showcase	W 67–60	4–0	Arena-Auditorium (5,019); Laramie, WY
11/21/2012*; 7:00 pm		at Northern Colorado	W 69–60	5–0	Butler-Hancock Sports Pavilion (1,785); Greeley, CO
11/24/2012*; 7:00 pm		Cal State Bakersfield	W 63–49	6–0	Arena-Auditorium (4,755); Laramie, WY
11/28/2012*; 8:00 pm		at UC Santa Barbara	W 68–40	7–0	The Thunderdome (1,351); Santa Barbara, CA
12/01/2012*; 8:00 pm, RTRM		No. 19 Colorado	W 76–69	8–0	Arena-Auditorium (8,240); Laramie, WY
12/04/2012*; 6:00 pm		at Illinois State; MWC – MVC Challenge	W 81–67	9–0	Redbird Arena (6,561); Normal, IL
12/08/2012*; 2:00 pm		OK Panhandle State	W 74–55	10–0	Arena-Auditorium (5,412); Laramie, WY
12/18/2012*; 7:00 pm		Denver	W 71–61	11–0	Arena-Auditorium (4,519); Laramie, WY
12/21/2012*; 7:00 pm		UC Santa Barbara	W 56–40	12–0	Arena-Auditorium (5,372); Laramie, WY
01/02/2013*; 6:00 pm		at SMU	W 59–56	13–0	Moody Coliseum (3,308); Dallas, TX
01/09/2013; 8:00 pm, RTRM	No. 25	Boise State	L 61–63	13–1 (0–1)	Arena-Auditorium (6,416); Laramie, WY
01/12/2013; 4:00 pm		at Nevada	W 59–48	14–1 (1–1)	Lawlor Events Center (6,282); Reno, NV
01/16/2013; 8:00 pm		at Fresno State	L 36–49	14–2 (1–2)	Save Mart Center (6,670); Fresno, CA
01/19/2013; 5:30 pm, TWCSN		No. 15 San Diego State	W 58–45	15–2 (2–2)	Arena-Auditorium (9,573); Laramie, WY
01/24/2013; 7:15 pm, CBSSN		at UNLV	L 50–62	15–3 (2–3)	Thomas & Mack Center (15,640); Paradise, NV
01/26/2013; 8:00 pm, RTRM		Air Force	L 48–57	15–4 (2–4)	Arena-Auditorium (8,404); Laramie, WY
01/30/2013; 7:00 pm, RTRM		No. 20 New Mexico	L 59–63	15–5 (2–5)	Arena-Auditorium (5,376); Laramie, WY
02/02/2013; 5:00 pm, RTRM		at Colorado State	L 46–65	15–6 (2–6)	Moby Arena (8,745); Fort Collins, CO
02/06/2013*; 8:00 pm		at Cal State Bakersfield	W 61–53	16–6	Rabobank Arena (1,208); Bakersfield, CA
02/09/2013; 6:00 pm		at Boise State	L 61–68	16–7 (2–7)	Taco Bell Arena (8,127); Boise, ID
02/13/2013; 7:00 pm		Nevada	W 68–48	17–7 (3–7)	Arena-Auditorium (4,903); Laramie, WY
02/16/2013; 2:00 pm		Fresno State	W 55–51 ^{OT}	18–7 (4–7)	Arena-Auditorium (6,377); Laramie, WY
02/19/2013; 8:00 pm, TWCSN		at San Diego State	L 51–79	18–8 (4–8)	Viejas Arena (12,414); San Diego, CA
02/23/2013; 5:30 pm, TWCSN		UNLV	L 42–65	18–9 (4–9)	Arena-Auditorium (7,097); Laramie, WY
02/26/2013; 7:00 pm, RTRM		at Air Force	L 66–72	18–10 (4–10)	Clune Arena (2,119); Colorado Springs, CO
03/02/2013; 3:00 pm, RTRM		at No. 14 New Mexico	L 42–53	18–11 (4–11)	The Pit (15,411); Albuquerque, NM
03/06/2013; 8:00 pm, RTRM		Colorado State	L 56–78	18–12 (4–12)	Arena-Auditorium (6,803); Laramie, WY
Mountain West tournament
03/12/2013; 6:00 pm		vs. Nevada; First Round	W 85–81	19–12	Thomas & Mack Center (N/A); Paradise, NV
03/13/2013; 7:30 pm, CBSSN		vs. New Mexico; Quarterfinals	L 46–59	19–13	Thomas & Mack Center (13,297); Paradise, NV
2013 CBI
03/19/2013*; 7:00 pm, AXS TV		Lehigh; First Round	W 67–66	20–13	Arena-Auditorium (1,528); Laramie, WY
03/25/2013*; 7:00 pm, AXS TV		Western Michigan; Quarterfinals	L 67–75 ^{OT}	20–14	Arena-Auditorium (2,544); Laramie, WY
*Non-conference game. ^{#}Rankings from AP Poll. (#) Tournament seedings in parentheses. All times are in Mountain Time.
