= 2012–13 Nevada Wolf Pack men's basketball team =

American college basketball season

2012–13 Nevada Wolf Pack men's basketball
- Conference: Mountain West Conference
- Record: 12–19 (3–13 MW)
- Head coach: David Carter (4th season)
- Assistant coaches: Doug Novsek; Keith Brown; Zac Claus
- Home arena: Lawlor Events Center

2012–13 Mountain West Conference men's basketball standings
	Conf.				Overall
Team	W		L	PCT	W		L	PCT
No. 10 New Mexico †	13	–	3	.813	29	–	6	.829
Colorado State	11	–	5	.688	26	–	9	.743
UNLV	10	–	6	.625	25	–	10	.714
San Diego State	9	–	7	.563	23	–	11	.676
Boise State	9	–	7	.563	21	–	11	.656
Air Force	8	–	8	.500	18	–	14	.563
Fresno State	5	–	11	.313	11	–	19	.367
Wyoming	4	–	12	.250	20	–	14	.588
Nevada	3	–	13	.188	12	–	19	.387
† 2013 MWC tournament winner Rankings from AP Poll

The 2012–13 Nevada Wolf Pack men's basketball team represented the University of Nevada, Reno during the 2012–13 NCAA Division I men's basketball season. The Wolf Pack, led by fourth year head coach David Carter, played their home games at the Lawlor Events Center and were new members of the Mountain West Conference. They finish with a record of 12–19 overall, 3–13 in Mountain West play to finish in last place. They lost in the first round of the Mountain West tournament to Wyoming.

== Roster ==
Number	Name	Position	Height	Weight	Year	Hometown
0	Marqueze Coleman	Guard	6–3	180	Freshman	Mission Hills, California
1	Patrick Nyeko	Guard	6–6	180	Senior	London, England
2	Jerry Evans Jr.	Guard	6–8	207	Junior	Lawndale, California
4	Devonte Elliott	Forward	6–10	220	Junior	Los Angeles, California
11	Brice Crook	Guard	6–4	205	Junior	Reno, Nevada
12	Keith Fuetsch	Guard	6–0	184	Senior	Reno, Nevada
13	Cole Huff	Forward	6–8	200	Freshman	Altadena, California
15	Jordan Finn	Guard	6–4	196	Junior	Rancho Cucamonga, California
20	Jordan Burris	Guard	6–7	218	Junior	Bakersfield, California
21	Cheika Ali Fall	Forward	6–9	240	Junior	Senegal
24	Deonte Burton	Guard	6–1	185	Junior	Los Angeles, California
33	Kevin Panzer	Forward	6–9	220	Junior	Mission Viejo, California
34	Malik Story	Guard	6–5	217	Senior	Pasadena, California
41	Richard Bell	Forward	6–9	227	RS Freshman	West Sussex, England

== Schedule ==
Date time, TV	Rank^{#}	Opponent^{#}	Result	Record	Site (attendance) city, state
Exhibition
11/06/2012*; 7:00 pm		Oregon Tech	W 86–75	–	Lawlor Events Center (3,054); Reno, NV
Regular season
11/10/2012*; 7:00 pm		at UC Irvine	L 64–78	0–1	Bren Events Center (1,561); Irvine, CA
11/16/2012*; 6:00 pm		Cal State Fullerton; World Vision Classic	W 80–77	1–1	Lawlor Events Center (6,261); Reno, NV
11/17/2012*; 6:00 pm		Green Bay; World Vision Classic	W 71–69	2–1	Lawlor Events Center (6,691); Reno, NV
11/18/2012*; 3:30 pm		Southern Utah; World Vision Classic	W 79–61	3–1	Lawlor Events Center (5,885); Reno, NV
11/24/2012*; 4:00 pm		at Marshall	L 82–89	3–2	Cam Henderson Center (5,583); Huntington, WV
11/28/2012*; 7:00 pm		UC Davis	W 84–83	4–2	Lawlor Events Center (5,892); Reno, NV
11/30/2012*; 7:00 pm		Drake; MWC–MVC Challenge	L 66–76	4–3	Lawlor Events Center (6,469); Reno, NV
12/04/2012*; 7:00 pm		at Pacific	L 72–78 ^{OT}	4–4	Alex G. Spanos Center (1,549); Stockton, CA
12/08/2012*; 5:00 pm, P12N		at Washington	W 76–73	5–4	Alaska Airlines Arena (7,724); Seattle, WA
12/11/2012*; 7:00 pm		Cal Poly	W 69–56	6–4	Lawlor Events Center (6,109); Reno, NV
12/15/2012*; 3:00 pm		San Francisco	W 59–51	7–4	Lawlor Events Center (5,910); Reno, NV
12/21/2012*; 7:00 pm		Cal State San Marcos	W 84–74	8–4	Lawlor Events Center (5,759); Reno, NV
12/28/2012*; 7:00 pm		Yale	W 85–75	9–4	Lawlor Events Center (7,226); Reno, NV
12/31/2012*; 4:00 pm, P12N		at Oregon	L 43–56	9–5	Matthew Knight Arena (5,817); Eugene, OR
01/09/2013; 6:00 pm		at Air Force	L 65–78	9–6 (0–1)	Clune Arena (1,856); Colorado Springs, CO
01/12/2013; 3:00 pm		Wyoming	L 48–59	9–7 (0–2)	Lawlor Events Center (6,282); Reno, NV
01/19/2013; 7:00 pm		at Fresno State	W 68–61	10–7 (1–2)	Save Mart Center (7,829); Fresno, CA
01/23/2013; 7:15 pm, CBSSN		San Diego State	L 57–78	10–8 (1–3)	Lawlor Events Center (7,924); Reno, NV
01/26/2013; 1:00 pm		Boise State	W 75–59	11–8 (2–3)	Lawlor Events Center (6,821); Reno, NV
01/29/2013; 7:00 pm, CBSSN		at UNLV	L 54–66	11–9 (2–4)	Thomas & Mack Center (16,787); Paradise, NV
02/02/2013; 5:00 pm, NBCSN		at No. 20 New Mexico	L 62–75	11–10 (2–5)	The Pit (15,346); Albuquerque, NM
02/06/2013; 7:15 pm, CBSSN		Colorado State	L 69–73	11–11 (2–6)	Lawlor Events Center (6,226); Reno, NV
02/09/2013; 3:00 pm		Air Force	W 74–69	12–11 (3–6)	Lawlor Events Center (6,673); Reno, NV
02/13/2013; 6:00 pm		at Wyoming	L 48–68	12–12 (3–7)	Arena-Auditorium (4,903); Laramie, WY
02/19/2013; 7:00 pm		Fresno State	L 64–69 ^{OT}	12–13 (3–8)	Lawlor Events Center (6,296); Reno, NV
02/23/2013; 3:00 pm, NBCSN		at San Diego State	L 75–88	12–14 (3–9)	Viejas Arena (12,414); San Diego, CA
02/27/2013; 5:00 pm		at Boise State	L 47–73	12–15 (3–10)	Taco Bell Arena (5,717); Boise, ID
03/02/2013; 1:00 pm, NBCSN		UNLV	L 63–80	12–16 (3–11)	Lawlor Events Center (9,956); Reno, NV
03/06/2013; 7:00 pm, CBSSN		No. 12 New Mexico	L 62–75	12–17 (3–12)	Lawlor Events Center (6,401); Reno, NV
03/09/2013; 5:30 pm, CBSSN		at Colorado State	L 66–77	12–18 (3–13)	Moby Arena (8,745); Fort Collins, CO
2013 Mountain West Conference men's basketball tournament
03/12/2013; 5:00 pm		vs. Wyoming; First Round	L 81–85	12–19	Thomas & Mack Center (N/A); Paradise, NV
*Non-conference game. ^{#}Rankings from AP Poll. (#) Tournament seedings in parentheses. All times are in Pacific Time.
