= 2012–13 Fresno State Bulldogs men's basketball team =

American college basketball season

2012–13 Fresno State Bulldogs men's basketball
- Conference: Mountain West Conference
- Record: 11–19 (5–11 Mountain West)
- Head coach: Rodney Terry
- Assistant coaches: Michael Schwartz; Byron Jones; Kenton Paulino
- Home arena: Save Mart Center

2012–13 Mountain West Conference men's basketball standings
	Conf.				Overall
Team	W		L	PCT	W		L	PCT
No. 10 New Mexico †	13	–	3	.813	29	–	6	.829
Colorado State	11	–	5	.688	26	–	9	.743
UNLV	10	–	6	.625	25	–	10	.714
San Diego State	9	–	7	.563	23	–	11	.676
Boise State	9	–	7	.563	21	–	11	.656
Air Force	8	–	8	.500	18	–	14	.563
Fresno State	5	–	11	.313	11	–	19	.367
Wyoming	4	–	12	.250	20	–	14	.588
Nevada	3	–	13	.188	12	–	19	.387
† 2013 MWC tournament winner Rankings from AP Poll

The 2012–13 Fresno State Bulldogs men's basketball team represented Fresno State University during the 2012–13 college basketball season. This was head coach Rodney Terry's second season at Fresno State. The Bulldogs played their home games at the Save Mart Center and were first year members of the Mountain West Conference. They finished the season 11–19, 5–11 in MWC play to finish in seventh place. They lost in the quarterfinals of the Mountain West tournament to Colorado State.

== 2012–13 Team ==
=== Roster ===
#	Name	Height	Weight (lbs.)	Position	Class	Hometown	Previous Team(s)
0	Jerry Brown	6'7"	210	F	RS Jr.	Richmond, CA, U.S.	Sacred Heart
1	Tyler Johnson	6'2"	180	G	Jr.	Mountain View, CA, U.S.	Saint Francis HS
2	Braeden Anderson	6'9"	235	F	Fr.	Alberta, Canada	Wilbraham & Monson Acad.
3	Kevin Olekaibe	6'2"	180	G	Jr.	Las Vegas, NV, U.S.	Cimarron-Memorial HS
5	Tanner Giddings	6'10"	225	C/F	Fr.	Windsor, CA, U.S.	Windsor HS
11	Aaron Anderson	6'3"	190	G	Fr.	Edmond, OK, U.S.	Edmond Santa Fe HS
20	Garrett Johnson	6'4"	195	G	Sr.	Pomona, CA, U.S.	Diamond Ranch HS
21	Allen Huddleston	6'2"	185	G	RS Jr.	Merced, CA, U.S.	Pacific
22	Brad Ely	6'3"	195	G	Sr.	Visalia, CA, U.S.	El Diamante HS
23	Marvelle Harris	6'4"	200	G	Fr.	Rialto, CA, U.S.	Eisenhower HS
24	Kevin Foster	6'8"	230	F	Sr.	Lakeland, FL, U.S.	College of Central Florida
25	Broderick Newbill	6'5"	185	F/G	Fr.	Kansas City, MO, U.S.	Hogan Prep Acad.
30	Robert Upshaw	7'0"	250	C	Fr.	Fresno, CA, U.S.	San Joaquin Mem. HS

|- |13 |Blake Williams |6'2" |205 |G |Fr. |Fresno, CA, U.S.

=== Coaching staff ===
Name	Position	Year at Fresno State	Alma Mater (Year)
Rodney Terry	Head Coach	2nd	St. Edwards (1990)
Michael Schwartz	Associate head coach	2nd	Texas (1999)
Bryon Jones	Assistant Coach	2nd	Central Oklahoma (1995)
Kenton Paulino	Assistant Coach	1st	Texas (2008)
Nick Matson	Director of Basketball Operations	2nd	VMI (2009)

== 2012–13 Schedule and Results ==
Date time, TV	Rank^{#}	Opponent^{#}	Result	Record	Site (attendance) city, state
Exhibition
11/02/2012*; 7:00 pm		Fresno Pacific	W 77–68		Save Mart Center (5,834); Fresno, CA
Regular season
11/09/2012*; 5:00 pm, LHN		at Texas	L 53–55	0–1	Frank Erwin Center (10,389); Austin, TX
11/14/2012*; 7:00 pm		at UC Riverside	W 39–30	1–1	Student Recreation Center (806); Riverside, CA
11/16/2012*; 7:00 pm		Pacific	W 66–61	2–1	Save Mart Center (6,341); Fresno, CA
11/19/2012*; 7:00 pm		at Cal Poly	W 76–67	3–1	Mott Gym (2,277); San Luis Obispo, CA
11/25/2012*; 1:00 pm		Long Beach State	L 61–69	3–2	Save Mart Center (5,810); Fresno, CA
11/28/2012*; 5:00 pm		at Southern Illinois; MWC–MVC Challenge	L 54–57	3–3	SIU Arena (5,409); Carbondale, IL
12/03/2012*; 7:00 pm		at Long Beach State	W 64–59	4–3	Walter Pyramid (3,032); Long Beach, CA
12/06/2012*; 7:00 pm		San Diego Christian	W 84–49	5–3	Save Mart Center (5,824); Fresno, CA
12/09/2012*; 12:00 pm, P12N		at Washington State	L 50–59	5–4	Beasley Coliseum (2,651); Pullman, WA
12/12/2012*; 7:00 pm		Colorado	L 43–50	5–5	Save Mart Center (6,599); Fresno, CA
12/15/2012*; 7:00 pm		UC Irvine	L 51–58	5–6	Save Mart Center (6,376); Fresno, CA
12/22/2012*; 8:00 pm, P12N		at UCLA	L 78–91	5–7	Pauley Pavilion (8,259); Los Angeles, CA
12/30/2012*; 1:00 pm		Sonoma State	W 89–64	6–7	Save Mart Center (5,844); Fresno, CA
01/09/2013; 8:30 pm, TWCSN		No. 16 San Diego State	L 62–65	6–8 (0–1)	Save Mart Center (7,203); Fresno, CA
01/12/2013; 12:00 pm		at No. 25 New Mexico	L 45–72	6–9 (0–2)	The Pit (15,337); Albuquerque, NM
01/16/2013; 7:00 pm		Wyoming	W 49–36	7–9 (1–2)	Save Mart Center (6,670); Fresno, CA
01/19/2013; 7:00 pm		Nevada	L 61–68	7–10 (1–3)	Save Mart Center (7,829); Fresno, CA
01/23/2013; 5:00 pm		at Boise State	L 67–74	7–11 (1–4)	Taco Bell Arena (4,862); Boise, ID
01/26/2013; 7:00 pm		Colorado State	L 63–74	7–12 (1–5)	Save Mart Center (8,103); Fresno, CA
01/30/2013; 6:00 pm		at Air Force	L 50–62	7–13 (1–6)	Clune Arena (2,009); Colorado Springs, CO
02/06/2013; 6:00 pm, TWCSN		UNLV	W 64–55	8–13 (2–6)	Save Mart Center (8,044); Fresno, CA
02/09/2013; 3:00 pm, CBSSN		at San Diego State	L 53–75	8–14 (2–7)	Viejas Arena (12,414); San Diego, CA
02/13/2013; 7:00 pm		No. 19 New Mexico	L 48–54	8–15 (2–8)	Save Mart Center (8,241); Fresno, CA
02/16/2013; 1:00 pm		at Wyoming	L 51–55 ^{OT}	8–16 (2–9)	Arena-Auditorium (6,377); Laramie, WY
02/19/2013; 7:00 pm		at Nevada	W 69–64 ^{OT}	9–16 (3–9)	Lawlor Events Center (6,296); Reno, NV
02/23/2013; 7:00 pm		Boise State	L 63–72	9–17 (3–10)	Save Mart Center (8,267); Fresno, CA
02/27/2013; 6:00 pm		at Colorado State	L 67–74	9–18 (3–11)	Moby Arena (5,371); Fort Collins, CO
03/02/2013; 7:00 pm		Air Force	W 56–41	10–18 (4–11)	Save Mart Center (7,788); Fresno, CA
03/09/2013; 3:00 pm, TWCSN		at UNLV	W 61–52	11–18 (5–11)	Thomas & Mack Center (17,707); Paradise, NV
2013 Mountain West Conference men's basketball tournament
03/13/2013; 2:30 pm, CBSSN		vs. Colorado State; Quarterfinals	L 61–67	11–19	Thomas & Mack Center (9,122); Paradise, NV
*Non-conference game. ^{#}Rankings from AP Poll. (#) Tournament seedings in parentheses. All times are in Pacific Time.
