= 2012–13 San Diego State Aztecs men's basketball team =

American college basketball season

2012–13 San Diego State Aztecs men's basketball
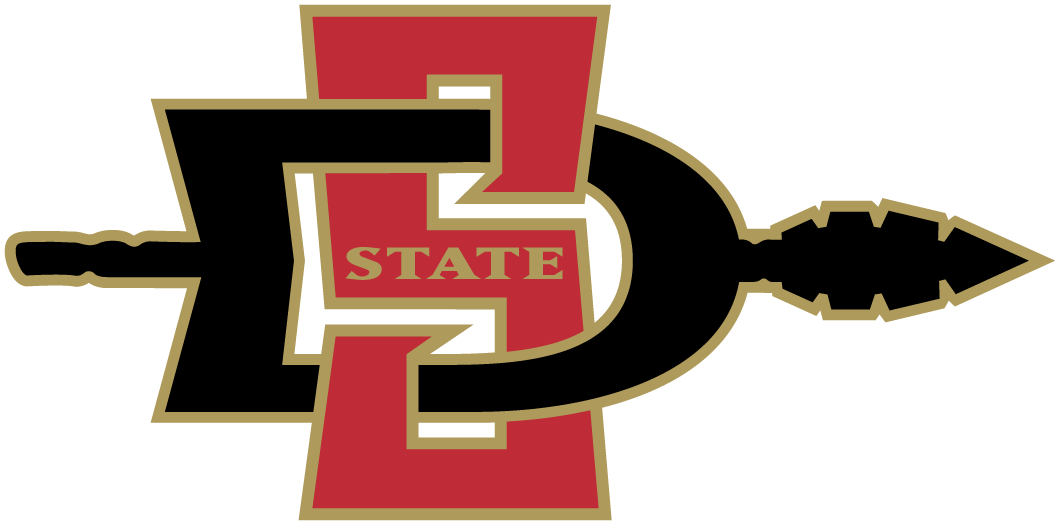

NCAA Tournament, Round of 32
- Conference: Mountain West Conference
- Record: 23–11 (9–7 Mountain West)
- Head coach: Steve Fisher
- Assistant coaches: Brian Dutcher; Mark Fisher; Tony Bland
- Home arena: Viejas Arena

2012–13 Mountain West Conference men's basketball standings
	Conf.				Overall
Team	W		L	PCT	W		L	PCT
No. 10 New Mexico †	13	–	3	.813	29	–	6	.829
Colorado State	11	–	5	.688	26	–	9	.743
UNLV	10	–	6	.625	25	–	10	.714
San Diego State	9	–	7	.563	23	–	11	.676
Boise State	9	–	7	.563	21	–	11	.656
Air Force	8	–	8	.500	18	–	14	.563
Fresno State	5	–	11	.313	11	–	19	.367
Wyoming	4	–	12	.250	20	–	14	.588
Nevada	3	–	13	.188	12	–	19	.387
† 2013 MWC tournament winner Rankings from AP Poll

The 2012–13 San Diego State men's basketball team represented San Diego State University in the 2012–13 college basketball season. They were members in the Mountain West Conference. This was head coach Steve Fisher's fourteenth season at San Diego State. The Aztecs played home games at Viejas Arena. They finished with a record of 23–11 overall, 9–7 in Mountain West play for a 3rd-place tie with Boise State. They lost in the semifinals in the 2013 Mountain West Conference men's basketball tournament to New Mexico. They received an at-large bid to the 2013 NCAA Division I men's basketball tournament, where they beat Oklahoma in the second round and lost in the third round to Florida Gulf Coast.

== Off Season ==
=== Departures ===
Name	Number	Pos.	Height	Weight	Year	Hometown	Reason for departure
Garrett Green	5	F	6'11"	230	Senior	Woodland Hills, California	Graduated
Tim Shelton	10	F	6'7"	245	Senior	Fresno, California	Graduated
Alec Williams	0	F	6'6"	245	Junior	San Juan Capistrano, California	Elected to transfer

=== Incoming transfers ===
Name	Number	Pos.	Height	Weight	Year	Hometown	Notes
Aqeel Quinn	14	G	6'3"	200	Junior	Gardena, California	Elected to transfer from Cal State Northridge. Quinn redshirted for the 2012–13 season, under NCAA transfer rules. Had two years of eligibility.

=== 2012 recruiting class ===
College recruiting
Name	Hometown	School	Height	Weight	Commit date
Winston Shepard; SF	Fresno, TX	Findlay College Prep	6 ft 8 in (2.03 m)	205 lb (93 kg)	Feb 16, 2012
Winston Shepard; SF	Recruit ratings: Scout: Rivals: (94)				
Matt Shrigley; SG	Encinitas, CA	La Costa Canyon High School	6 ft 5 in (1.96 m)	190 lb (86 kg)	Jun 16, 2011
Matt Shrigley; SG	Recruit ratings: Scout: Rivals: (92)				
Skylar Spencer; PF	Los Angeles, CA	Frederick K.C. Price High School	6 ft 9 in (2.06 m)	220 lb (100 kg)	Sep 4, 2011
Skylar Spencer; PF	Recruit ratings: Scout: Rivals: (89)				
Overall recruit ranking:
Note: In many cases, Scout, Rivals, 247Sports, On3, and ESPN may conflict in their listings of height and weight.; In these cases, the average was taken. ESPN grades are on a 100-point scale.; Sources: "2012 Team Ranking". Rivals.

== Roster ==
2012–13 San Diego State Aztecs men's basketball team
Players
Coaches

Pos.	#	Name	Height	Weight	Year	Previous school	Hometown
F	0	Skylar Spencer	6 ft 9 in (2.06 m)	235 lb (107 kg)	Fr	Frederick K.C. Price H.S.	Inglewood, California
G	2	Xavier Thames	6 ft 3 in (1.91 m)	190 lb (86 kg)	RS Jr	Pleasant Grove H.S./Washington State	Sacramento, California
G	3	LaBradford Franklin	6 ft 2 in (1.88 m)	175 lb (79 kg)	Jr	Great Oak H.S.	Temecula, California
G	4	Ryan Staten	6 ft 1 in (1.85 m)	195 lb (88 kg)	So	Piedmont H.S.	San Pablo, California
F	5	Dwayne Polee II	6 ft 7 in (2.01 m)	195 lb (88 kg)	RS So	Westchester H.S./St. John's	Los Angeles, California
G	11	James Rahon	6 ft 5 in (1.96 m)	205 lb (93 kg)	RS Sr	Torrey Pines H.S./Santa Clara	San Diego, California
F	12	James Johnson	6 ft 9 in (2.06 m)	235 lb (107 kg)	RS So	Elsinore H.S./Virginia	San Diego, California
F	13	Winston Shepard	6 ft 8 in (2.03 m)	210 lb (95 kg)	Fr	Findlay Prep	Houston, Texas
G	14	Aqeel Quinn (redshirt)	6 ft 3 in (1.91 m)	200 lb (91 kg)	Jr	Leuzinger H.S./CS Northridge	Gardena, California
F	20	J.J. O'Brien	6 ft 7 in (2.01 m)	225 lb (102 kg)	RS So	Alta Loma H.S./Utah	Rancho Cucamonga, California
G	21	Jamaal Franklin	6 ft 5 in (1.96 m)	205 lb (93 kg)	Jr	Westwind Prep	Hawthorne, California
G	22	Chase Tapley	6 ft 3 in (1.91 m)	195 lb (88 kg)	Sr	Sacramento H.S.	Sacramento, California
F	23	Deshawn Stephens	6 ft 8 in (2.03 m)	225 lb (102 kg)	Sr	Chatsworth H.S./Santa Monica College	Los Angeles, California
G	25	Narbeh Ebrahimian	6 ft 3 in (1.91 m)	200 lb (91 kg)	Sr	Crescenta Valley H.S./Glendale Community College	Glendale, California
G	32	Aaron Douglas	6 ft 1 in (1.85 m)	195 lb (88 kg)	Sr	Charter School of San Diego/Cuyamaca College	San Diego, California
G	33	Jeremy Castleberry	5 ft 10 in (1.78 m)	205 lb (93 kg)	Jr	Martin Luther King H.S.	Upper Marlboro, Maryland
F	40	Matt Shrigley (redshirt)	6 ft 6 in (1.98 m)	195 lb (88 kg)	Fr	La Costa Canyon H.S.	San Diego, California

Head coach

- Steve Fisher (Illinois State)

Assistant coach(es)

- Brian Dutcher (Minnesota)
- Mark Fisher (Michigan)
- Tony Bland (San Diego State)

Legend

- (C) Team captain
- (S) Suspended
- (I) Ineligible
- (W) Walk-on
- Injured
- Current redshirt

Roster
Last update: 11-12-12

== Schedule and results ==
- All times are Pacific

Date time, TV	Rank^{#}	Opponent^{#}	Result	Record	Site (attendance) city, state
Exhibition
11/01/2012*; 7:00 pm	No. 20	Cal State San Marcos	W 67–46	–	Viejas Arena (12,414); San Diego, CA
11/05/2012*; 7:00 pm	No. 20	UC San Diego	W 80–56	–	Viejas Arena (12,414); San Diego, CA
Regular season
11/11/2012*; 1:00 pm, FSN	No. 20	vs. No. 9 Syracuse; Battle on the Midway	L 49–62	0–1	USS Midway (5,119); San Diego, CA
11/13/2012*; 7:00 pm, FSSD	No. 25	San Diego Christian	W 91–57	1–1	Viejas Arena (12,414); San Diego, CA
11/17/2012*; 11:00 am	No. 25	at Missouri State; MWC–MVC Challenge	W 60–44	2–1	JQH Arena (7,272); Springfield, MO
11/21/2012*; 7:30 pm, FSSD	No. 25	Arkansas–Pine Bluff	W 79–43	3–1	Viejas Arena (12,414); San Diego, CA
11/25/2012*; 7:00 pm, FSN	No. 25	at USC	W 66–60	4–1	Galen Center (4,421); Los Angeles, CA
12/01/2012*; 7:00 pm, ESPNU	No. 23	vs. UCLA; John R. Wooden Classic	W 78–69	5–1	Honda Center (17,204); Anaheim, CA
12/03/2012*; 7:00 pm, TWCSN	No. 17	Texas Southern	W 74–62	6–1	Viejas Arena (12,414); San Diego, CA
12/06/2012*; 8:00 pm, TWCSN	No. 17	UC Santa Barbara	W 84–70	7–1	Viejas Arena (12,414); San Diego, CA
12/15/2012*; 7:00 pm, 4SD	No. 18	San Diego; City Championship	W 72–56	8–1	Viejas Arena (12,414); San Diego, CA
12/18/2012*; 7:00 pm, FSSD	No. 18	Point Loma Nazarene	W 76–49	9–1	Viejas Arena (12,414); San Diego, CA
12/22/2012*; 3:42 pm, ESPNU	No. 18	vs. San Francisco; Diamond Head Classic Quarterfinals	W 80–58	10–1	Stan Sheriff Center (6,691); Honolulu, HI
12/23/2012*; 2:30 pm, ESPNU	No. 18	vs. Indiana State; Diamond Head Classic Semifinals	W 62–55	11–1	Stan Sheriff Center (6,419); Honolulu, HI
12/25/2012*; 7:15 pm, ESPN2	No. 17	vs. No. 3 Arizona; Diamond Head Classic Finals	L 67–68	11–2	Stan Sheriff Center (6,514); Honolulu, HI
01/02/2013*; 7:00 pm, TWCSN	No. 19	Cal State Bakersfield	W 72–57	12–2	Viejas Arena (12,414); San Diego, CA
01/09/2013; 8:30 pm, TWCSN	No. 16	at Fresno State	W 65–62	13–2 (1–0)	Save Mart Center (7,203); Fresno, CA
01/12/2013; 5:00 pm, NBCSN	No. 16	Colorado State	W 79–72 ^{OT}	14–2 (2–0)	Viejas Arena (12,414); San Diego, CA
01/16/2013; 7:00 pm, CBSSN	No. 15	UNLV	L 75–82	14–3 (2–1)	Viejas Arena (12,414); San Diego, CA
01/19/2013; 4:30 pm, TWCSN	No. 15	at Wyoming	L 45–58	14–4 (2–2)	Arena-Auditorium (9,573); Laramie, WY
01/23/2013; 7:15 pm, CBSSN		at Nevada	W 78–57	15–4 (3–2)	Lawlor Events Center (7,924); Reno, NV
01/26/2013; 1:00 pm, NBCSN		No. 15 New Mexico	W 55–34	16–4 (4–2)	Viejas Arena (12,414); San Diego, CA
02/02/2013; 12:00 pm, TWCSN	No. 22	at Air Force	L 67–70	16–5 (4–3)	Clune Arena (5,011); Colorado Springs, CO
02/06/2013; 8:00 pm, TWCSN		Boise State	W 63–62	17–5 (5–3)	Viejas Arena (12,414); San Diego, CA
02/09/2013; 3:00 pm, CBSSN		Fresno State	W 75–53	18–5 (6–3)	Viejas Arena (12,414); San Diego, CA
02/13/2013; 7:00 pm, CBSSN		at No. 24 Colorado State	L 60–66	18–6 (6–4)	Moby Arena (8,745); Fort Collins, CO
02/16/2013; 6:00 pm, NBCSN		at UNLV	L 70–72	18–7 (6–5)	Thomas & Mack Center (18,577); Paradise, NV
02/19/2013; 7:00 pm, TWCSN		Wyoming	W 79–51	19–7 (7–5)	Viejas Arena (12,414); San Diego, CA
02/23/2013; 3:00 pm, NBCSN		Nevada	W 88–75	20–7 (8–5)	Viejas Arena (12,414); San Diego, CA
02/27/2013; 7:15 pm, CBSSN		at No. 14 New Mexico	L 60–70	20–8 (8–6)	The Pit (15,411); Albuquerque, NM
03/06/2013; 8:30 pm, TWCSN		Air Force	W 58–51	21–8 (9–6)	Viejas Arena (12,414); San Diego, CA
03/09/2013; 12:30 pm, NBCSN		at Boise State	L 65–69	21–9 (9–7)	Taco Bell Arena (10,455); Boise, ID
2013 Mountain West Conference men's basketball tournament
03/13/2013; 9:00 pm, CBSSN	(4)	vs. (5) Boise State; Quarterfinals	W 73–67	22–9	Thomas & Mack Center (13,297); Paradise, NV
03/15/2013; 6:00 pm, CBSSN	(4)	vs. (1) No. 15 New Mexico; Semifinals	L 50–60	22–10	Thomas & Mack Center (18,500); Paradise, NV
2013 NCAA tournament
03/22/2013*; 6:48 pm, TBS	(7 S)	vs. (10 S) Oklahoma; Second Round	W 70–55	23–10	Wells Fargo Center (20,125); Philadelphia, PA
03/24/2013*; 4:10 pm, TBS	(7 S)	vs. (15 S) Florida Gulf Coast; Third Round	L 71–81	23–11	Wells Fargo Center (20,125); Philadelphia, PA
*Non-conference game. ^{#}Rankings from AP Poll. (#) during NCAA Tournament is Seed with Region S=South. (#) Tournament seedings in parentheses. All times are in Pacific Time Zone.

== Rankings ==
Ranking movements Legend: ██ Increase in ranking ██ Decrease in ranking — = Not ranked RV = Received votes т = Tied with team above or below
	Week																			
Poll	Pre	1	2	3	4	5	6	7	8	9	10	11	12	13	14	15	16	17	18	Final
AP	20	25	25	23	17	18	18	17	19	16	15	RV	22	RV	RV	—	—	—	—	Not released
Coaches	20	23	25	21	15	15	15	16	17	15	14	25	20	25T	22	RV	RV	RV	RV	—

*AP does not release post-NCAA Tournament rankings.
