= 2012–13 UNLV Runnin' Rebels basketball team =

American college basketball season

2012–13 UNLV Runnin' Rebels men's basketball

NCAA tournament, Round of 64
- Conference: Mountain West Conference
- Record: 25–10 (10–6 Mountain West)
- Head coach: Dave Rice
- Assistant coaches: Justin Hutson; Stacey Augmon; Heath Schroyer
- Home arena: Thomas & Mack Center

2012–13 Mountain West Conference men's basketball standings
	Conf.				Overall
Team	W		L	PCT	W		L	PCT
No. 10 New Mexico †	13	–	3	.813	29	–	6	.829
Colorado State	11	–	5	.688	26	–	9	.743
UNLV	10	–	6	.625	25	–	10	.714
San Diego State	9	–	7	.563	23	–	11	.676
Boise State	9	–	7	.563	21	–	11	.656
Air Force	8	–	8	.500	18	–	14	.563
Fresno State	5	–	11	.313	11	–	19	.367
Wyoming	4	–	12	.250	20	–	14	.588
Nevada	3	–	13	.188	12	–	19	.387
† 2013 MWC tournament winner Rankings from AP Poll

The 2012–13 UNLV Runnin' Rebels men's basketball team represented the University of Nevada, Las Vegas during the 2012–13 NCAA Division I men's basketball season. The team was coached by Dave Rice, in his second year with the Runnin' Rebels. They played their home games at the Thomas & Mack Center on UNLV's main campus in Las Vegas, Nevada and were members of the Mountain West Conference. They finished with a record of 25–10 overall, 10–6 in Mountain West play to finish in third place. They advanced to the championship game of the Mountain West tournament, where they lost to New Mexico. They received an at-large bid to the 2013 NCAA tournament, where they lost in the second round to California.

== Roster ==
#	Name	Height	Weight (lbs.)	Position	Class	Hometown	Previous school
0	Savon Goodman	6'6"	210	F	Fr.	Philadelphia, PA	Constitution HS
1	Quintrell Thomas	6'8"	245	F	RS Sr.	Newark, NJ	Kansas
2	Khem Birch	6'8"	220	F	So.	Montreal, QC, Canada	Pittsburgh
3	Anthony Marshall	6'3"	200	G	Sr.	Las Vegas, NV	Mojave HS
5	Katin Reinhardt	6'5"	195	G	Fr.	Dana Point, CA	Mater Dei HS
10	Daquan Cook	6'1"	170	G	Fr.	Baltimore, MD	St. Frances Acad.
11	Carlos Lopez	6'11"	215	F	RS Jr.	Lajas, Puerto Rico	Findlay Prep
12	Barry Cheaney	6'1"	160	G	So.	Corona, CA	Los Osos HS
13	Bryce Dejean-Jones	6'5"	200	G	RS So.	Los Angeles, CA	USC
15	Anthony Bennett	6'8"	240	F	Fr.	Brampton, ON, Canada	Findlay Prep
22	Roscoe Smith	6'8"	205	F	Jr.	Baltimore, MD	Connecticut
24	Demetris Morant	6'9"	200	F	Fr.	Las Vegas, NV	Bishop Gorman HS
31	Justin Hawkins	6'3"	190	G	Sr.	Los Angeles, CA	Taft HS
33	Charles Rushman	6'3"	185	G	Fr.	Milwaukee, WI	St. John's Prep
43	Mike Moser	6'8"	210	F	RS Jr.	Portland, OR	UCLA

=== Recruiting class ===
College recruiting
Name	Hometown	School	Height	Weight	Commit date
Anthony Bennett; PF	Brampton, ON	Findlay Prep	6 ft 7 in (2.01 m)	230 lb (100 kg)	May 12, 2012
Anthony Bennett; PF	Recruit ratings: Scout: Rivals: (97)				
Katin Reinhardt; SG	Dana Point, CA	Mater Dei	6 ft 5 in (1.96 m)	195 lb (88 kg)	Aug 11, 2011
Katin Reinhardt; SG	Recruit ratings: Scout: Rivals: (94)				
Savon Goodman; SF	Philadelphia, PA	Constitution	6 ft 6 in (1.98 m)	210 lb (95 kg)	Aug 29, 2011
Savon Goodman; SF	Recruit ratings: Scout: Rivals: (92)				
Demetris Morant; C	Las Vegas Valley, NV	Bishop Gorman	6 ft 9 in (2.06 m)	200 lb (91 kg)	Aug 30, 2011
Demetris Morant; C	Recruit ratings: Scout: Rivals: (88)				
Daquan Cook; PG	Baltimore, MD	St. Frances Academy	6 ft 1 in (1.85 m)	170 lb (77 kg)	Jul 21, 2011
Daquan Cook; PG	Recruit ratings: Scout: Rivals: (88)				
Overall recruit ranking: Scout: #12 Rivals: #30 ESPN: #7
Note: In many cases, Scout, Rivals, 247Sports, On3, and ESPN may conflict in their listings of height and weight.; In these cases, the average was taken. ESPN grades are on a 100-point scale.; Sources: "UNLV 2012 Basketball Commits". Rivals.; "UNLV 2012 Basketball Commits". Scout.; "UNLV 2012 Basketball Commits". ESPN.; "Scout.com Team Recruiting Rankings". Scout.; "2012 Team Ranking". Rivals.

== Rankings ==
Ranking movements Legend: ██ Increase in ranking ██ Decrease in ranking — = Not ranked RV = Received votes
	Week																					
Poll	Pre	1	2	3	4	5	6	7	8	9	10	11	12	13	14	15	16	17	18	19	20	Final
AP	18	18	18	18	24	21	20	21	20	RV	24	RV	RV	RV	RV	RV	—	RV	RV	RV	RV	Not released
Coaches	19	19	18	18	20	18	17	18	17	24	19	23	RV	RV	RV	RV	—	RV	RV	RV	RV	

*AP does not release post-NCAA Tournament rankings.

== Schedule and results ==
Date time, TV	Rank^{#}	Opponent^{#}	Result	Record	Site (attendance) city, state
Exhibition
11/07/2012*; 7:00 pm	No. 18	Dixie State	W 81–80 ^{OT}	–	Thomas & Mack Center (12,814); Paradise, NV
Regular season
11/12/2012*; 7:00 pm	No. 18	Northern Arizona; Global Sports Classic	W 92–54	1–0	Thomas & Mack Center (18,187); Paradise, NV
11/17/2012*; 7:00 pm	No. 18	Jacksonville State; Global Sports Classic	W 77–58	2–0	Thomas & Mack Center (15,316); Paradise, NV
11/23/2012*; 6:00 pm, CBSSN	No. 18	Oregon; Global Sports Classic semifinals	L 79–83	2–1	Thomas & Mack Center (16,730); Paradise, NV
11/24/2012*; 5:00 pm	No. 18	Iowa State; Global Sports Classic 3rd place game	W 82–70	3–1	Thomas & Mack Center (13,954); Paradise, NV
11/28/2012*; 7:00 pm, TWCSN	No. 24	UC Irvine	W 85–57	4–1	Thomas & Mack Center (13,876); Paradise, NV
12/01/2012*; 4:00 pm, TWCSN	No. 24	Hawai'i	W 77–63	5–1	Thomas & Mack Center (15,431); Paradise, NV
12/04/2012*; 8:00 pm, ESPNU	No. 21	at Portland	W 68–60	6–1	Chiles Center (4,513); Portland, OR
12/09/2012*; 3:00 pm, ESPNU	No. 21	at California	W 76–75	7–1	Haas Pavilion (8,724); Berkeley, CA
12/13/2012*; 7:00 pm, KTUD	No. 20	vs. La Verne	W 91–44	8–1	Orleans Arena (5,069); Paradise, NV
12/17/2012*; 5:00 pm, CBSSN	No. 21	at UTEP	W 62–60	9–1	Don Haskins Center (9,027); El Paso, TX
12/19/2012*; 7:00 pm, TWCSN	No. 21	Northern Iowa; MWC–MWC Challenge	W 73–59	10–1	Thomas & Mack Center (14,484); Paradise, NV
12/22/2012*; 7:00 pm, TWCSN	No. 21	Canisius	W 89–74	11–1	Thomas & Mack Center (14,533); Paradise, NV
12/29/2012*; 7:00 pm, ESPN2	No. 20	at North Carolina	L 73–79	11–2	Dean E. Smith Center (20,888); Chapel Hill, NC
01/03/2013*; 7:00 pm		Chicago State	W 74–52	12–2	Thomas & Mack Center (14,122); Paradise, NV
01/05/2013*; 7:00 pm, TWCSN		Cal State Bakersfield	W 72–57	13–2	Thomas & Mack Center (14,119); Paradise, NV
01/09/2013; 7:00 pm, CBSSN	No. 24	at No. 25 New Mexico	L 60–65	13–3 (0–1)	The Pit (15,411); Albuquerque, NM
01/13/2013; 7:00 pm, TWCSN	No. 24	Air Force	W 76–71 ^{OT}	14–3 (1–1)	Thomas & Mack Center (14,723); Paradise, NV
01/16/2013; 7:00 pm, CBSSN		at No. 15 San Diego State	W 82–75	15–3 (2–1)	Viejas Arena (12,414); San Diego, CA
01/19/2013; 4:00 pm, NBCSN		at Colorado State	L 61–66	15–4 (2–2)	Moby Arena (7,626); Fort Collins, CO
01/24/2013; 6:15 pm, CBSSN		Wyoming	W 62–50	16–4 (3–2)	Thomas & Mack Center (15,640); Paradise, NV
01/29/2013; 7:00 pm, CBSSN		Nevada	W 66–54	17–4 (4–2)	Thomas & Mack Center (16,787); Paradise, NV
02/02/2013; 6:00 pm, TWCSN		at Boise State	L 72–77	17–5 (4–3)	Taco Bell Arena (9,356); Boise, ID
02/06/2013; 6:00 pm, TWCSN		at Fresno State	L 55–64	17–6 (4–4)	Save Mart Center (8,044); Fresno, CA
02/09/2013; 6:00 pm, NBCSN		No. 15 New Mexico	W 64–55	18–6 (5–4)	Thomas & Mack Center (17,738); Paradise, NV
02/13/2013; 6:00 pm, TWCSN		at Air Force	L 56–71	18–7 (5–5)	Clune Arena (2,553); Colorado Springs, CO
02/16/2013; 6:00 pm, NBCSN		San Diego State	W 72–70	19–7 (6–5)	Thomas & Mack Center (18,577); Paradise, NV
02/16/2013; 7:15 pm, CBSSN		No. 22 Colorado State	W 61–59	20–7 (7–5)	Thomas & Mack Center (15,910); Paradise, NV
02/23/2013; 4:30 pm, TWCSN		at Wyoming	W 65–42	21–7 (8–5)	Arena-Auditorium (7,097); Laramie, WY
03/02/2013; 1:00 pm, NBCSN		at Nevada	W 80–63	22–7 (9–5)	Lawlor Events Center (9,956); Reno, NV
03/05/2013; 7:00 pm, TWCSN		Boise State	W 68–64	23–7 (10–5)	Thomas & Mack Center (15,295); Paradise, NV
03/05/2013; 3:00 pm, TWCSN		Fresno State	L 52–61	23–8 (10–6)	Thomas & Mack Center (17,707); Paradise, NV
Mountain West tournament
03/13/2013; 12:00 pm, CBSSN	(3)	vs. (6) Air Force; Quarterfinals	W 72–56	24–8	Thomas & Mack Center (9,122); Paradise, NV
03/14/2013; 8:30 pm, CBSSN	(3)	vs. (2) Colorado State; Semifinals	W 75–65	25–8	Thomas & Mack Center (18,500); Paradise, NV
03/15/2013; 3:00 pm, CBS	(3)	vs. (1) No. 15 New Mexico; Championship Game	L 56–63	25–9	Thomas & Mack Center (18,500); Paradise, NV
NCAA tournament
03/21/2013; 4:27 pm, TruTV	(5 E)	vs. (12 E) California; Second Round	L 61–64	25–10	HP Pavilion (17,997); San Jose, CA
*Non-conference game. ^{#}Rankings from AP Poll. (#) Tournament seedings in parentheses. All times are in Pacific Time. (#) during NCAA Tournament is seed with Region.
