= 2012–13 Cal State Bakersfield Roadrunners men's basketball team =

American college basketball season

2012–13 Cal State Bakersfield Roadrunners men's basketball
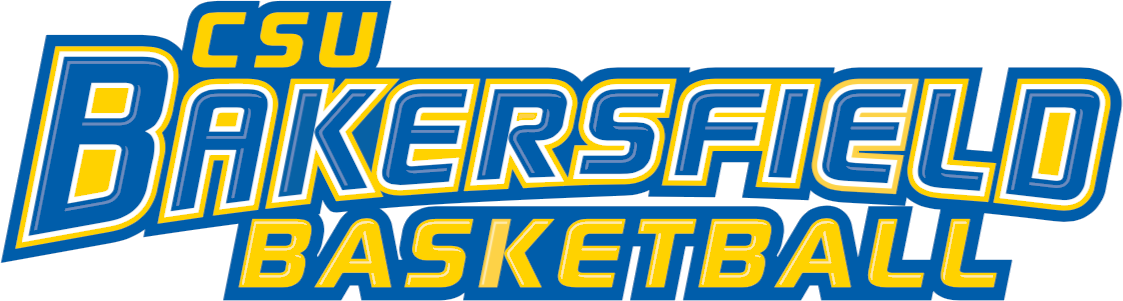
- Conference: Independent
- Record: 14–16
- Head coach: Rod Barnes (2nd season)
- Assistant coaches: Bryan Goodman; Jeff Conarroe; Kevin Missouri
- Home arena: Icardo Center; Rabobank Arena

2012–13 NCAA Division I men's basketball independents standings
	Conf.				Overall
Team	W		L	PCT	W		L	PCT
Cal State Bakersfield		–		–	14	–	16	.467
New Orleans		–		–	8	–	18	.308
Rankings from AP Poll

The 2012–13 Cal State Bakersfield Roadrunners men's basketball team represented California State University, Bakersfield during the 2012–13 NCAA Division I men's basketball season. The Roadrunners, led by second year head coach Rod Barnes, played their home games at the Icardo Center, with four home games at Rabobank Arena, and played as an independent. They finished the season 14–16. This was the Roadrunners last year as an independent as they will join the Western Athletic Conference in July 2013.

== Roster ==
Number	Name	Position	Height	Weight	Year	Hometown
0	Justin Omogun	Forward	6–8	240	Sophomore	Brooklyn, New York
1	Tyrone White	Guard/Forward	6–7	185	Senior	Portland, Oregon
2	Brandon Barnes	Guard	6–1	195	Junior	Atlanta, Georgia
3	Javonte Maynor	Guard	6–0	175	Sophomore	Snellville, Georgia
4	Matthew Ratto	Guard	5–11	160	Junior	Modesto, California
5	Zachary Lamb	Guard	6–3	180	Senior	Norcross, Georgia
11	Mo Hughley	Forward	6–7	240	Senior	Queens Village, New York
12	Issiah Grayson	Guard	5–11	165	Senior	Atlanta, Georgia
15	Kregg Jones	Forward	6–8	235	Sophomore	Saint George, Barbados
20	Britton Williams	Guard	5–11	155	Freshman	Bakersfield, California
21	Adam Young	Forward	6–8	235	Senior	Las Vegas, Nevada
22	Corey Hall	Forward	6–7	210	Junior	Chicago, Illinois
23	Abdul Ahmed	Center	6–10	250	Junior	London, Great Britain
24	Erik Kinney	Forward	6–4	210	Freshman	Fairfield, California
25	Dee Wallace	Guard	5–10	150	Sophomore	Oxford, Mississippi
33	Stefon Johnson	Forward	6–6	210	Senior	Cincinnati, Ohio
44	Stephon Carter	Guard	6–3	180	Senior	Bakersfield, California
55	Tyler Smith	Center	6–11	265	Junior	McLoud, Oklahoma

== Schedule ==
The Roadrunners played a series of exhibition games in The Bahamas from September 2–7.

Date time, TV	Opponent	Result	Record	Site (attendance) city, state
Regular Season
11/09/2012; 6:00 pm	UT–Arlington	L 60–62	0–1	Icardo Center (1,257); Bakersfield, CA
11/11/2012; 7:00 pm, Pac-12 Network	at California	L 65–78	0–2	Haas Pavilion (8,715); Berkeley, CA
11/14/2012; 7:00 pm	at Sacramento State	L 67–85	0–3	Colberg Court (492); Sacramento, CA
11/17/2012; 7:00 pm	Loyola Marymount	L 73–76	0–4	Icardo Center (1,093); Bakersfield, CA
11/20/2012; 7:00 pm	Westmont	W 77–74	1–4	Icardo Center (1,049); Bakersfield, CA
11/24/2012; 6:00 pm	at Wyoming	L 49–63	1–5	Arena-Auditorium (4,755); Laramie, WY
12/01/2012; 7:00 pm	UTSA	W 85–52	2–5	Rabobank Arena (2,037); Bakersfield, CA
12/06/2012; 7:00 pm	at Cal State Fullerton	W 72–70	3–5	Titan Gym (708); Fullerton, CA
12/09/2012; 12:30 pm	at South Dakota State	L 63–69	3–6	Frost Arena (886); Brookings, SD
12/15/2012; 7:00 pm	La Verne	W 69–49	4–6	Icardo Center (915); Bakersfield, CA
12/17/2012; 7:00 pm	at Portland; Las Vegas Classic	L 51–69	4–7	Chiles Center (1,018); Portland, OR
12/19/2012*; 6:00 pm	at Colorado State; Las Vegas Classic	L 58–78	4–8	Moby Arena (2,896); Fort Collins, CO
12/22/2012; 2:30 pm	vs. North Florida; Las Vegas Classic	L 70–80	4–9	Orleans Arena (N/A); Paradise, NV
12/23/2012; 12:45 pm	vs. Mississippi Valley State; Las Vegas Classic	W 69–64	5–9	Orleans Arena (N/A); Paradise, NV
12/29/2012; 7:00 pm	at Loyola Marymount	L 66–73	5–10	Gersten Pavilion (1,018); Los Angeles, CA
12/30/2012; 4:00 pm	North Carolina A&T	W 60–52	6–10	Rabobank Arena (1,881); Bakersfield, CA
01/02/2013; 7:00 pm, TWCSN	at No. 19 San Diego State	L 57–72	6–11	Viejas Arena (12,414); San Diego, CA
01/05/2013; 7:00 pm, TWSCN	at UNLV	L 63–84	6–12	Thomas & Mack Center (14,119); Paradise, NV
01/09/2013; 7:00 pm	Cal State Fullerton	L 62–74	6–13	Icardo Center (1,347); Bakersfield, CA
01/19/2013; 7:00 pm	Nebraska–Omaha	W 84–79	7–13	Icardo Center (1,074); Bakersfield, CA
01/23/2013; 7:00 pm	at Santa Clara	L 36–66	7–14	Leavey Center (1,493); Santa Clara, CA
02/02/2013; 7:00 pm	Utah Valley	W 75–62	8–14	Icardo Center (1,086); Bakersfield, CA
02/06/2013; 7:00 pm	Wyoming	L 53–61	8–15	Rabobank Arena (1,208); Bakersfield, CA
02/09/2013; 7:00 pm	Cal State San Marcos	W 82–71	9–15	Icardo Center (1,175); Bakersfield, CA
02/12/2013; 5:00 pm	at UTSA	W 61–52	10–15	Convocation Center (1,007); San Antonio, TX
02/14/2013; 5:00 pm, Broncs Live	at Texas-Pan America	L 73–79 ^{OT}	10–16	UTPA Fieldhouse (956); Edinburg, TX
02/20/2013; 7:00 pm	South Dakota State	W 79–78 ^{2OT}	11–16	Rabobank Arena (1,005); Bakersfield, CA
02/23/2013; 6:00 pm	Pacifica College	W 114–66	12–16	Icardo Center (1,151); Bakersfield, CA
03/06/2013; 7:00 pm	at Seattle	W 75–74 ^{OT}	13–16	ShoWare Center (1,052); Kent, WA
03/09/2013; 6:05 pm, UVU-TV	at Utah Valley	W 73–58	14–16	UCCU Center (3,826); Orem, UT
*Non-conference game. ^{#}Rankings from AP Poll. (#) Tournament seedings in parentheses. All times are in Pacific Time.
