= Phillip McDonald =

American basketball player

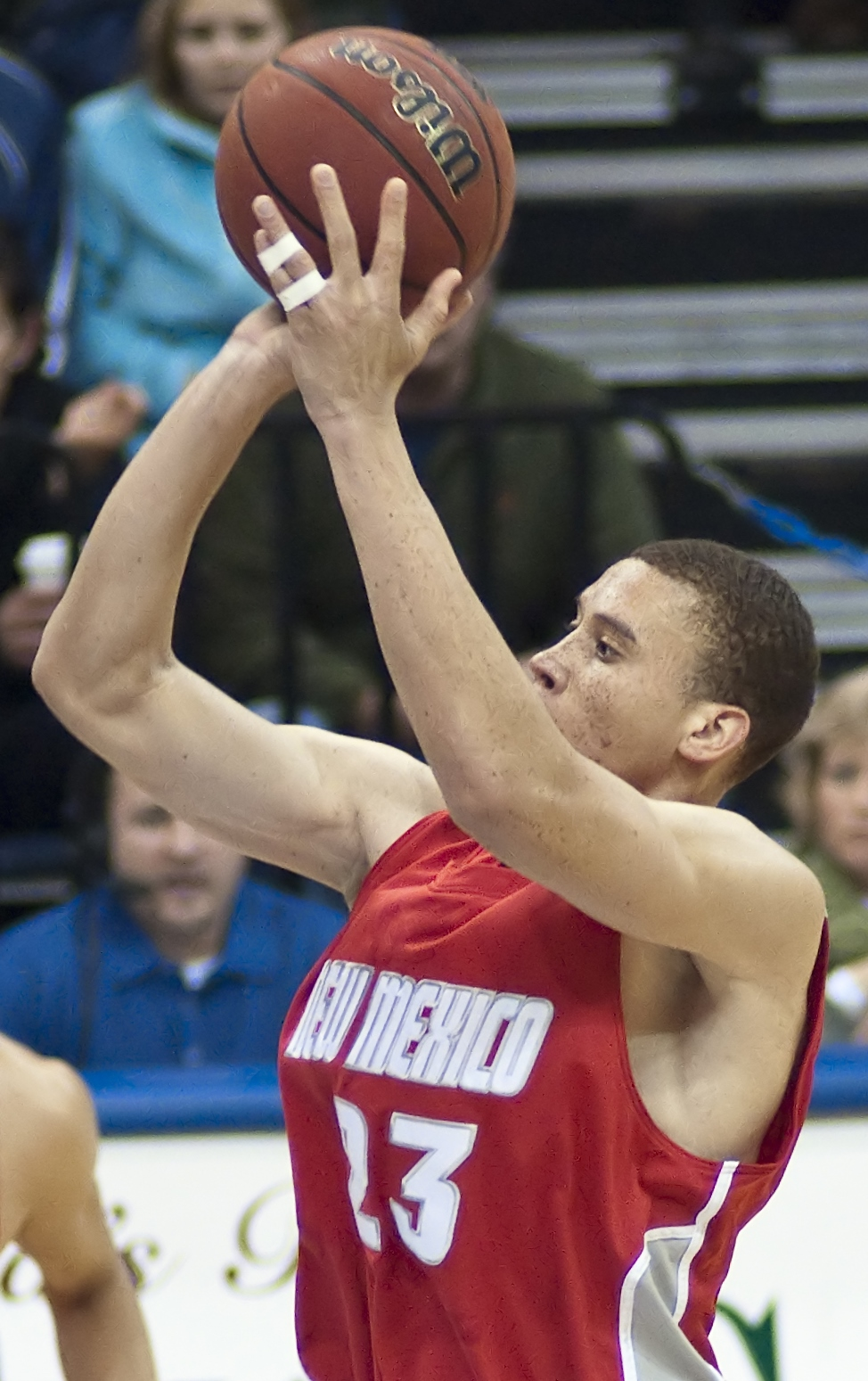
- McDonald in 2009

Personal information
- Born: July 25, 1989 (age 37) Cypress, Texas, U.S.
- Listed height: 6 ft 5 in (1.96 m)
- Listed weight: 200 lb (91 kg)

Career information
- High school: Cypress Springs (Cypress, Texas)
- College: New Mexico (2008–2012)
- NBA draft: 2012: undrafted
- Playing career: 2012–present
- Position: Shooting guard

Career history
- 2012–2013: Eco Örebro

Phillip Michael McDonald (born July 25, 1989) is an American professional basketball player. He began his college career playing for the New Mexico Lobos men's basketball team. Born in Cypress, Texas, McDonald was the starting shooting guard for the Lobos the first three years he has played, and provided experience and depth off the bench for the Lobos his senior year.

== High school ==
McDonald attended Cypress Springs High School in Cypress, Texas, and garnered a number of accolades during his four-year career. During his senior year for the Panthers, McDonald led Cypress Springs to a 32–7 record while averaging 19 points en route to being named the 17-5A District Most Valuable Player. Through his recruiting process, McDonald was rated a four-star recruit by both Rivals.com and Scout.com, and was ranked the 20th and 19th best shooting guard in the nation, respectively. ESPN pegged McDonald as the tenth best shooting guard nationally, enough to gain a 96 rating (out of 100) and a place in the ESPNU 100. After McDonald signed in late 2007, Rivals.com named McDonald the top shooting guard signee in the Mountain West Conference.

== College ==
=== Freshman Year, 2008–2009 ===
On September 12, 2007, McDonald signed with Steve Alford's New Mexico Lobos basketball team, beating out other schools like Oregon, Kansas, Connecticut and Oklahoma. McDonald was the starting shooting guard, and posted the most starts by a Lobos freshman since Rob Robbins started 36 in 1987–1988. He posted double-digit scoring eleven times, including a double-double in a win against Grambling St. and a pair of seventeen-point performances against Texas Tech and San Diego State.

Games Played	Games Started	Minutes/Game	Points/Game	Rebounds/Game	Assists/Game	Field Goal Percentage	3pt. Field Goal Percentage	Free Throw Percentage
33	33	20.4	7.3	3.1	1.0	44.4%	36.6%	65.3%

=== Sophomore Year, 2009–2010 ===
Building off a solid freshman campaign, McDonald increased his production and impact as the Lobos marched into the Top 25. McDonald ranked sixth in the Mountain West Conference in three-point shooting through the entire year, and fourth in the conference during conference play. McDonald's premier sophomore games included posting a career high in points (27) in a 97-87 win over in-state rival New Mexico State, a 15-point performance in a 86-78 win over 25th-ranked Cal, and a 25-point outburst in a 73-50 victory over Air Force. At season's end, McDonald's work was rewarded, as he was named Honorable Mention All-Mountain West.

Games Played	Games Started	Minutes/Game	Points/Game	Rebounds/Game	Assists/Game	Field Goal Percentage	3pt. Field Goal Percentage	Free Throw Percentage
35	35	27.5	10.4	3.1	0.7	43.0%	39.6%	69.1%

=== Junior Year, 2010–2011 ===
Still poised to be a big part of the Lobos moving into the 2010–2011 season, McDonald was forced to miss the first three games of the season after suffering an elbow injury in an exhibition game to Manchester. While it slightly hindered him, McDonald still soldiered through the season. In a game versus New Mexico State, McDonald pulled down his second career double-double, notching 18 points to go with 10 boards. In a contest against Colorado State, McDonald tied a career high in points, as he tallied 27 points off the bench. Later in the season, McDonald posted 20 points in a 71-46 victory over TCU. His most celebrated junior moment came when New Mexico routed third-ranked BYU in Provo, as McDonald posted 26 points on 5-8 shooting from behind the arc.

Games Played	Games Started	Minutes/Game	Points/Game	Rebounds/Game	Assists/Game	Field Goal Percentage	3pt. Field Goal Percentage	Free Throw Percentage
32	30	27.8	10.9	4.3	1.1	40.4%	32.5%	76.6%

=== Senior Year, 2011–2012 ===
With the emergence of teammate Tony Snell as a legitimate all-around small forward and continual injury problems, McDonald opened the season as a reserve, marking his last season as the only season he was not a starter for the majority of the season. Nonetheless, McDonald had a few shining games, including an 18-point effort in 19 minutes off the bench against UMKC.

Games Played	Games Started	Minutes/Game	Points/Game	Rebounds/Game	Assists/Game	Field Goal Percentage	3pt. Field Goal Percentage	Free Throw Percentage
11	1	12.0	4.9	1.5	0.6	41.3%	46.7%	100.0%

== Professional career ==
In November 2012 Phillip signed to play for Eco Örebro, a professional team based out of Örebro, Sweden.

== Personal life ==
Phillip has a daughter from a previous relationship during high school with Adria Espree.

Phillip is married to former model, Michaela McDonald of Santa Fe, New Mexico. The two have son, Jayden McDonald born December 29, 2010, and daughter Mariah McDonald, born June 25, 2013
