= 2012–13 Eastern Washington Eagles men's basketball team =

American college basketball season

2012–13 Eastern Washington Eagles men's basketball
- Conference: Big Sky Conference
- Record: 10–21 (7–13 Big Sky)
- Head coach: Jim Hayford (2nd season)
- Assistant coaches: Craig Fortier; Craig Ehlo; Shantay Legans
- Home arena: Reese Court

2012–13 Big Sky men's basketball standings
	Conf.				Overall
Team	W		L	PCT	W		L	PCT
Montana †	19	–	1	.950	25	–	7	.781
Weber State	18	–	2	.900	30	–	7	.811
North Dakota	12	–	8	.600	16	–	17	.485
Montana State	10	–	10	.500	13	–	17	.433
Northern Colorado	10	–	10	.500	13	–	18	.419
Sacramento State	8	–	12	.400	14	–	15	.483
Southern Utah	8	–	12	.400	11	–	20	.355
Northern Arizona	8	–	12	.400	11	–	21	.344
Eastern Washington	7	–	13	.350	10	–	21	.323
Portland State	5	–	15	.250	8	–	20	.286
Idaho State	5	–	15	.250	6	–	24	.200
† Conference tournament winner

The 2012–13 Eastern Washington Eagles men's basketball team represented Eastern Washington University during the 2012–13 NCAA Division I men's basketball season. The Eagles, led by second year head coach Jim Hayford, played their home games at Reese Court and were members of the Big Sky Conference. They finished the season 10–21, 7–13 in Big Sky play to finish in ninth place. They failed to qualify for the Big Sky tournament.

== Roster ==
Number	Name	Position	Height	Weight	Year	Hometown
1	Tyler Harvey	Guard	6–4	174	Freshman	Torrance, California
2	Daniel Hill	Guard	5–9	160	Freshman	Sydney, Australia
4	Danny Powell	Forward	6–6	225	Freshman	Phoenix, Arizona
5	Justin Crosgile	Guard	5–11	170	Junior	Paterson, New Jersey
10	Parker Kelly	Guard	6–4	195	Sophomore	Spokane, Washington
12	Martin Seiferth	Forward	6–10	230	Sophomore	Berlin, Germany
13	Thomas Reuter	Forward	6–6	225	Freshman	Breckerfeld, Germany
20	Ivan Dorsey	Guard	6–0	180	Junior	San Francisco, California
21	Frederik Jörg	Forward	7–1	285	Freshman	Korschenbroich, Germany
22	Jeffrey Forbes	Guard	5–10	170	Senior	Federal Way, Washington
23	Kevin Winford	Guard	5–11	170	Senior	Anchorage, Alaska
24	Collin Chiverton	Forward	6–6	200	Senior	San Jose, California
25	Jordan Hickert	Forward	6–9	230	Senior	Bunbury, Australia
34	Jaylen Henry	Forward	6–7	230	Junior	Las Vegas, Nevada
42	Garrett Moon	Forward	6–5	200	Junior	San Francisco, California
55	Venky Jois	Forward	6–7	220	Freshman	Boronia, Australia

== Schedule ==
Date time, TV	Opponent	Result	Record	Site (attendance) city, state
Exhibition
11/04/2012*; 3:30 pm	Concordia (CA)	W 96–70	–	Reese Court; Cheney, WA
Regular season
11/10/2012*; 4:30 pm, P12N	at Washington State; CBE Classic	L 69–88	0–1	Beasley Coliseum (6,705); Pullman, WA
11/12/2012*; 7:00 pm	at Cal State Northridge	L 79–96	0–2	Matadome (847); Northridge, CA
11/18/2012*; 5:00 pm	at Saint Mary's	L 66–85	0–3	McKeon Pavilion (2,614); Moraga, CA
11/20/2012*; 8:15 pm	vs. Utah Valley; CBE Classic	L 83–86	0–4	Leavey Center (1,169); Santa Clara, CA
11/21/2012*; 6:00 pm	vs. USC Upstate; CBE Classic	W 75–70	1–4	Leavey Center (1,164); Santa Clara, CA
11/23/2012*; 4:15 pm	at Santa Clara; CBE Classic	L 74–89	1–5	Leavey Center (1,250); Santa Clara, CA
11/30/2012*; 6:00 pm	Cal State Fullerton	W 79–75	2–5	Reese Court (732); Cheney, WA
12/06/2012*; 6:00 pm, SWX	Idaho	L 79–81 ^{OT}	2–6	Reese Court (1,107); Cheney, WA
12/10/2012*; 6:00 pm, SWX	Seattle	L 69–75	2–7	Reese Court (712); Cheney, WA
12/17/2012*; 7:00 pm	at UC Davis	L 65–87	2–8	The Pavilion (780); Davis, CA
12/20/2012; 6:05 pm	Weber State	L 53–74	2–9 (0–1)	Reese Court (610); Cheney, WA
12/22/2012; 2:05 pm	Idaho State	W 57–54	3–9 (1–1)	Reese Court (610); Cheney, WA
01/03/2013; 6:05 pm	at Montana	L 66–81	3–10 (1–2)	Dahlberg Arena (3,269); Missoula, MT
01/05/2013; 6:05 pm	at Montana State	L 68–70 ^{OT}	3–11 (1–3)	Worthington Arena (2,248); Bozeman, MT
01/10/2013; 6:05 pm	Northern Arizona	W 82–59	4–11 (2–3)	Reese Court (1,010); Cheney, WA
01/12/2013; 6:05 pm, SWX	Sacramento State	L 53–60	4–12 (2–4)	Reese Court (1,006); Cheney, WA
01/17/2013; 5:05 pm, FCS/Midco SN	at North Dakota	L 47–65	4–13 (2–5)	Betty Engelstad Sioux Center (1,456); Grand Forks, ND
01/19/2013; 6:05 pm	at Northern Colorado	L 56–72	4–14 (2–6)	Butler–Hancock Sports Pavilion (1,616); Greeley, CO
01/26/2013; 6:05 pm	at Southern Utah	L 55–69	4–15 (2–7)	Centrum Arena (3,081); Cedar City, UT
01/28/2013; 6:05 pm, SWX	Portland State	W 76–65	5–15 (3–7)	Reese Court (1,214); Cheney, WA
01/31/2013; 6:05 pm	Montana State	W 72–68	6–15 (4–7)	Reese Court (1,330); Cheney, WA
02/02/2013; 6:05 pm, SWX	Montana	L 46–65	6–16 (4–8)	Reese Court (2,732); Cheney, WA
02/07/2013; 7:05 pm	at Sacramento State	L 55–61	6–17 (4–9)	Colberg Court (859); Sacramento, CA
02/09/2013; 12:05 pm, FCS	at Northern Arizona	W 77–74 ^{OT}	7–17 (5–9)	Walkup Skydome (1,379); Flagstaff, AZ
02/16/2013; 2:05 pm, SWX	Southern Utah	W 86–72	8–17 (6–9)	Reese Court (1,037); Cheney, WA
02/18/2013; 7:35 pm	at Portland State	L 80–89	8–18 (6–10)	Stott Center (810); Portland, OR
02/23/2013*; 1:00 pm	Sam Houston State; BracketBusters	W 81–76	9–18	Reese Court (1,023); Cheney, WA
02/28/2013; 6:05 pm	Northern Colorado	L 80–88 ^{OT}	9–19 (6–11)	Reese Court (1,128); Cheney, WA
03/02/2013; 2:05 pm	North Dakota	L 74–78	9–20 (6–12)	Reese Court (1,102); Cheney, WA
03/07/2013; 6:05 pm	at Idaho State	W 87–73	10–20 (7–12)	Reed Gym (1,873); Pocatello, ID
03/09/2013; 6:00 pm	at Weber State	L 57–65	10–21 (7–13)	Dee Events Center (7,546); Ogden, UT
*Non-conference game. ^{#}Rankings from AP Poll. (#) Tournament seedings in parentheses. All times are in Pacific Time.
