= 2012–13 University of North Dakota men's basketball team =

American college basketball season

2012–13 University of North Dakota men's basketball

CIT, First Round
- Conference: Big Sky Conference
- Record: 16–17 (12–8 Big Sky)
- Head coach: Brian Jones (7th season)
- Assistant coaches: Gameli Ahelegbe; Dean Oliver; Brent Wilson
- Home arena: Betty Engelstad Sioux Center

2012–13 Big Sky men's basketball standings
	Conf.				Overall
Team	W		L	PCT	W		L	PCT
Montana †	19	–	1	.950	25	–	7	.781
Weber State	18	–	2	.900	30	–	7	.811
North Dakota	12	–	8	.600	16	–	17	.485
Montana State	10	–	10	.500	13	–	17	.433
Northern Colorado	10	–	10	.500	13	–	18	.419
Sacramento State	8	–	12	.400	14	–	15	.483
Southern Utah	8	–	12	.400	11	–	20	.355
Northern Arizona	8	–	12	.400	11	–	21	.344
Eastern Washington	7	–	13	.350	10	–	21	.323
Portland State	5	–	15	.250	8	–	20	.286
Idaho State	5	–	15	.250	6	–	24	.200
† Conference tournament winner

The 2012–13 University of North Dakota men's basketball team represented the University of North Dakota during the 2012–13 NCAA Division I men's basketball season. They were led by seventh year head coach Brian Jones, played their home games at the Betty Engelstad Sioux Center and were first year members of the Big Sky Conference. They finished the season 16–17, 12–8 in Big Sky play to finish in third place. They advanced to the semifinals of the Big Sky tournament, where they lost to Weber State. They were invited to the 2013 CollegeInsider.com Postseason Tournament, their third straight CIT appearance, where they lost in the first round to Northern Iowa.

== Roster ==
Number	Name	Position	Height	Weight	Year	Hometown
0	Aaron Anderson	Guard	5–10	150	Junior	Brooklyn Park, Minnesota
1	Jaron Nash	Forward	6–8	185	Junior	Waterloo, Iowa
3	Lenny Antwi	Guard	6–1	176	Sophomore	Montreal, Quebec
5	Troy Huff	Guard/Forward	6–5	174	Junior	Milwaukee, Wisconsin
10	Shane Benton	Guard	6–3	202	Freshman	Cedar Rapids, Iowa
11	Jamal Webb	Guard	6–1	188	Junior	Buffalo, New York
12	Jordan Allard	Guard	6–8	225	Senior	Fargo, North Dakota
20	Blake Thomas	Guard	6–2	196	Freshman	Hagerstown, Maryland
22	Mitch Wilmer	Center	6–11	236	Senior	Warroad, Minnesota
24	Brandon Brekke	Forward/Center	6–8	216	Junior	East Grand Forks, Minnesota
25	Dustin Hobaugh	Guard	6–4	190	Sophomore	League City, Texas
32	Josh Schuler	Guard	6–3	184	Junior	Urbana, Ohio
33	Doug Archer	Forward/Center	6–8	210	Senior	Conception Junction, Missouri
40	Dan Stockdale	Forward	6–8	182	Senior	Sheboygan, Wisconsin
41	Ryan Salmonson	Center	6–9	216	Junior	Colfax, California
42	Alonzo Traylor	Forward	6–7	214	Junior	Minneapolis, Minnesota

== Schedule ==
Date time, TV	Opponent	Result	Record	Site (attendance) city, state
Regular season
11/09/2012*; 8:00 pm, FS North	at Kansas State	L 52–85	0–1	Bramlage Coliseum (12,199); Manhattan, KS
11/14/2012*; 7:00 pm, Big Sky TV	Crown College (MN)	W 87–51	1–1	Betty Engelstad Sioux Center (1,446); Grand Forks, ND
11/17/2012*; 1:00 pm, ESPN3	at Northern Iowa	L 47–72	1–2	McLeod Center (3,227); Cedar Falls, IA
11/20/2012*; 11:00 pm, OC Sports	at Hawaiʻi	L 66–71	1–3	Stan Sheriff Center (5,203); Honolulu, HI
11/28/2012*; 8:30 pm, Midco SN	at South Dakota State	L 70–71	1–4	Frost Arena (3,055); Brookings, SD
12/05/2012*; 7:00 pm, Midco SN	UMKC	L 70–73	1–5	Betty Engelstad Sioux Center (1,549); Grand Forks, ND
12/09/2012*; 4:00 pm, Midco SN	at North Dakota State	L 52–72	1–6	Fargodome (5,168); Fargo, ND
12/13/2012*; 7:00 pm, Big Sky TV	Presentation	W 74–32	2–6	Betty Engelstad Sioux Center (1,311); Grand Forks, ND
12/17/2012; 8:30 pm, Big Sky TV	at Southern Utah	L 67–79	2–7 (0–1)	Centrum Arena (1,332); Cedar City, UT
12/21/2012; 7:05 pm, Midco SN/FCS Atlantic	Northern Colorado	L 66–75	2–8 (0–2)	Betty Engelstad Sioux Center (1,449); Grand Forks, ND
12/28/2012*; 7:00 pm, Big Sky TV	Bowling Green	W 56–53	3–8	Betty Engelstad Sioux Center (1,681); Grand Forks, ND
01/03/2013; 8:05 pm, Big Sky TV	at Idaho State	W 66–53	4–8 (1–2)	Holt Arena (1,906); Pocatello, ID
01/05/2013; 8:00 pm, Big Sky TV	at Weber State	L 63–95	4–9 (1–3)	Dee Events Center (5,813); Ogden, UT
01/10/2013; 7:05 pm, Big Sky TV	Montana	L 62–77	4–10 (1–4)	Betty Engelstad Sioux Center (1,844); Grand Forks, ND
01/12/2013; 2:05 pm, Big Sky TV	Montana State	W 86–73	5–10 (2–4)	Betty Engelstad Sioux Center (1,897); Grand Forks, ND
01/17/2013; 7:05 pm, Midco SN	Eastern Washington	W 65–47	6–10 (3–4)	Betty Engelstad Sioux Center (1,456); Grand Forks, ND
01/19/2013; 2:05 pm, Big Sky TV	Portland State	W 85–76	7–10 (4–4)	Betty Engelstad Sioux Center (1,519); Grand Forks, ND
01/24/2013; 9:05 pm, Big Sky TV	at Sacramento State	L 58–67	7–11 (4–5)	Colberg Court (681); Sacramento, CA
01/26/2013; 3:05 pm, NAU-TV	at Northern Arizona	W 81–79	8–11 (5–5)	Walkup Skydome (1,601); Flagstaff, AZ
01/31/2013; 7:05 pm, Big Sky TV	Weber State	L 51–66	8–12 (5–6)	Betty Engelstad Sioux Center (1,599); Grand Forks, ND
02/02/2013; 2:05 pm, Big Sky TV	Idaho State	W 69–52	9–12 (6–6)	Betty Engelstad Sioux Center (1,959); Grand Forks, ND
02/07/2013; 8:05 pm, Big Sky TV	at Montana State	W 82–73	10–12 (7–6)	Worthington Arena (2,344); Bozeman, MT
02/09/2013; 8:05 pm, Big Sky TV	at Montana	L 58–78	10–13 (7–7)	Dahlberg Arena (5,366); Missoula, MT
02/14/2013; 7:05 pm, Midco SN	Sacramento State	W 49–48	11–13 (8–7)	Betty Engelstad Sioux Center (1,692); Grand Forks, ND
02/16/2013; 2:05 pm, Midco SN	Northern Arizona	L 72–74 ^{OT}	11–14 (8–8)	Betty Engelstad Sioux Center (1,617); Grand Forks, ND
02/20/2013; 8:05 pm, Big Sky TV	at Northern Colorado	W 64–62	12–14 (9–8)	Butler–Hancock Sports Pavilion (1,431); Greeley, CO
02/23/2013*; 1:00 pm	at Nebraska–Omaha; BracketBusters	L 75–83	12–15	Ralston Arena (964); Ralston, NE
02/28/2013; 9:35 pm, Big Sky TV	at Portland State	W 74–66	13–15 (10–8)	Stott Center (863); Portland, OR
03/02/2013; 4:05 pm, Big Sky TV	at Eastern Washington	W 78–74	14–15 (11–8)	Reese Court (1,102); Cheney, WA
03/09/2013; 2:00 pm, Big Sky TV	Southern Utah	W 68–61	15–15 (12–8)	Betty Engelstad Sioux Center (1,737); Grand Forks, ND
2013 Big Sky Conference men's basketball tournament
03/14/2013; 6:30 pm, Big Sky TV	vs. Southern Utah; Quarterfinals	W 69–52	16–15	Dahlberg Arena (3,333); Missoula, MT
03/15/2013; 6:30 pm, Big Sky TV	vs. Weber State; Semifinals	L 74–76	16–16	Dahlberg Arena (6,919); Missoula, MT
2013 CIT
03/20/2013*; 7:00 pm	at Northern Iowa; First Round	L 66–77	16–17	McLeod Center (2,450); Cedar Falls, IA
*Non-conference game. ^{#}Rankings from AP Poll. (#) Tournament seedings in parentheses. All times are in Central Time.
