= 2012–13 Northern Colorado Bears men's basketball team =

American college basketball season

2012–13 Northern Colorado Bears men's basketball
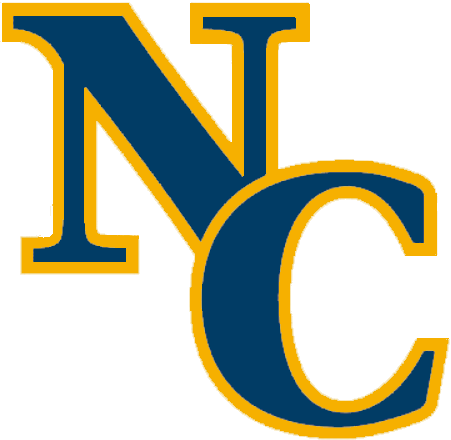
- Conference: Big Sky Conference
- Record: 0-0 (13 wins, 18 losses vacated) (0-0 (10 wins, 10 losses vacated) Big Sky)
- Head coach: B. J. Hill (3rd season)
- Assistant coaches: Shawn Ellis; Ry Martin; Logan Bean
- Home arena: Butler–Hancock Sports Pavilion

2012–13 Big Sky men's basketball standings
	Conf.				Overall
Team	W		L	PCT	W		L	PCT
Montana †	19	–	1	.950	25	–	7	.781
Weber State	18	–	2	.900	30	–	7	.811
North Dakota	12	–	8	.600	16	–	17	.485
Montana State	10	–	10	.500	13	–	17	.433
Northern Colorado	10	–	10	.500	13	–	18	.419
Sacramento State	8	–	12	.400	14	–	15	.483
Southern Utah	8	–	12	.400	11	–	20	.355
Northern Arizona	8	–	12	.400	11	–	21	.344
Eastern Washington	7	–	13	.350	10	–	21	.323
Portland State	5	–	15	.250	8	–	20	.286
Idaho State	5	–	15	.250	6	–	24	.200
† Conference tournament winner

The 2012–13 Northern Colorado Bears men's basketball team represented the University of Northern Colorado during the 2012–13 NCAA Division I men's basketball season. The Bears, led by third year head coach B. J. Hill, played their home games at the Butler–Hancock Sports Pavilion and were of the Big Sky Conference. They finished the season 13–18, 10–10 in Big Sky play to finish in a tie for fourth place. They advanced to the semifinals of the Big Sky tournament where they lost to Montana.

== Roster ==
Number	Name	Position	Height	Weight	Year	Hometown
0	James Davis, Jr.	Guard	6–1	170	Freshman	San Lorenzo, California
1	Derrick Barden	Forward	6–5	215	Junior	Detroit, Michigan
2	Xzaivier James	Guard	5–11	175	Junior	Greeley, Colorado
3	Paul Garnica	Guard	6–0	160	Junior	San Antonio, Texas
5	Tevin Svihovec	Guard	6–2	190	Sophomore	Kingwood, Texas
10	Cody McDavis	Forward	6–8	200	Freshman	Phoenix, Arizona
15	Tate Unruh	Guard	6–4	175	Junior	Branson, Missouri
21	Brendan Keane	Forward	6–9	235	Sophomore	Oakland, California
22	Tim Huskisson	Forward	6–5	190	Sophomore	Willard, Missouri
24	Emmanuel Addo	Forward/Center	6–7	220	Junior	Toronto, Ontario
25	Bryce Douvier	Forward	6–6	215	Sophomore	Sedgwick, Kansas
30	Greg Tucker	Guard	6–2	190	Freshman	Charleston, Missouri
32	Dylan Elias	Guard	6–1	175	Freshman	San Angelo, Texas
34	Connor Osborne	Center	6–9	270	Junior	Littleton, Colorado

== Schedule ==
Date time, TV	Opponent	Result	Record	Site (attendance) city, state
Exhibition
11/06/2012*; 7:00 pm, Big Sky TV	UC–Colorado Springs	W 99–61		Butler–Hancock Sports Pavilion; Greeley, CO
Regular season
11/10/2012*; 1:05 pm, Big Sky TV	Southwest	W 127–81	1–0	Butler–Hancock Sports Pavilion (1,138); Greeley, CO
11/15/2012*; 8:00 pm	at Cal Poly	L 53–64	1–1	Mott Gym (1,255); San Luis Obispo, CA
11/21/2012*; 7:00 pm, Big Sky TV	Wyoming	L 60–69	1–2	Butler–Hancock Sports Pavilion (1,785); Greeley, CO
11/26/2012*; 7:00 pm	at Colorado State	L 69–85	1–3	Moby Arena (3,622); Fort Collins, CO
12/01/2012*; 8:00 pm	at UC Riverside	L 63–69	1–4	UC Riverside Student Recreation Center (574); Riverside, CA
12/05/2012*; 7:00 pm	at Northern Iowa	L 59–76	1–5	McLeod Center (3,366); Cedar Falss, IA
12/08/2012*; 7:00 pm	at No. 24 Wichita State	L 54–80	1–6	Charles Koch Arena (10,307); Wichita, KS
12/17/2012*; 7:05 pm, Big Sky TV	Tabor (KS)	W 90–62	2–6	Butler–Hancock Sports Pavilion (1,131); Greeley, CO
12/21/2012; 6:05 pm, Midco SN/FCS Atlantic/Big Sky TV	at North Dakota	W 75–66	3–6 (1–0)	Betty Engelstad Sioux Center (1,449); Grand Forks, ND
12/29/2012; 7:35 pm, Big Sky TV	at Southern Utah	L 50–51	3–7 (1–1)	Centrum Arena (2,728); Cedar City, UT
01/03/2013; 7:05 pm, Big Sky TV	at Weber State	L 54–79	3–8 (1–2)	Dee Events Center (5,612); Ogden, UT
01/05/2013; 7:05 pm, Big Sky TV	at Idaho State	L 63–86	3–9 (1–3)	Holt Arena (1,522); Pocatello, ID
01/10/2013; 7:05 pm, ALT/Big Sky TV	Montana State	L 66–69	3–10 (1–4)	Butler–Hancock Sports Pavilion (1,023); Greeley, CO
01/12/2013; 4:35 pm, ALT/Big Sky TV	Montana	L 77–85	3–11 (1–5)	Butler–Hancock Sports Pavilion (355); Greeley, CO
01/17/2013; 7:05 pm, Big Sky TV	Portland State	W 67–50	4–11 (2–5)	Butler–Hancock Sports Pavilion (1,341); Greeley, CO
01/19/2013; 7:05 pm, Big Sky TV	Eastern Washington	W 72–56	5–11 (3–5)	Butler–Hancock Sports Pavilion (1,616); Greeley, CO
01/24/2013; 6:35 pm, NAU-TV/FCS/Big Sky TV	at Northern Arizona	L 65–67	5–12 (3–6)	Walkup Skydome (853); Flagstaff, AZ
01/26/2013; 8:05 pm, Big Sky TV	at Sacramento State	L 72–79	5–13 (3–7)	Colberg Court (684); Sacramento, CA
01/31/2013; 7:05 pm, Big Sky TV	Idaho State	W 78–63	6–13 (4–7)	Butler–Hancock Sports Pavilion (1,784); Greeley, CO
02/02/2013; 7:05 pm, Big Sky TV	Weber State	L 64–85	6–14 (4–8)	Butler–Hancock Sports Pavilion (1,488); Greeley, CO
02/07/2013; 7:00 pm, Big Sky TV	at Montana	L 63–73	6–15 (4–9)	Dahlberg Arena (4,036); Missoula, MT
02/09/2013; 7:00 pm, Big Sky TV	at Montana State	W 85–72	7–15 (5–9)	Worthington Arena (2,808); Bozeman, MT
02/14/2013; 7:00 pm, Big Sky TV	Northern Arizona	W 76–68	8–15 (6–9)	Butler–Hancock Sports Pavilion (1,251); Greeley, CO
02/16/2013; 7:05 pm, Big Sky TV	Sacramento State	W 78–64	9–15 (7–9)	Butler–Hancock Sports Pavilion (1,540); Greeley, CO
02/20/2013; 7:05 pm, Big Sky TV	North Dakota	L 62–64	9–16 (7–10)	Butler–Hancock Sports Pavilion (1,431); Greeley, CO
02/23/2013*; 2:30 pm	at UC Davis; BracketBusters	L 78–79	9–17	The Pavilion (1,631); Davis, CA
02/28/2013; 7:05 pm, Big Sky TV	at Eastern Washington	W 88–80 ^{OT}	10–17 (8–10)	Reese Court (1,128); Cheney, WA
03/02/2013; 8:35 pm, Big Sky TV	at Portland State	W 85–75	11–17 (9–10)	Stott Center (961); Portland, OR
03/07/2013; 7:05 pm, Big Sky TV	Southern Utah	W 66–58	12–17 (10–10)	Butler–Hancock Sports Pavilion (1,767); Greeley, CO
2013 Big Sky Conference men's basketball tournament
03/14/2013; 8:00 pm, Big Sky TV	vs. Montana State; Quarterfinals	W 69–56	13–17	Dahlberg Arena (3,333); Missoula, MT
03/15/2013; 8:00 pm, Big Sky TV	at Montana; Semifinals	L 56–70	13–18	Dahlberg Arena (6,919); Missoula, MT
*Non-conference game. ^{#}Rankings from AP Poll. (#) Tournament seedings in parentheses. All times are in Mountain Time.
