= 2012–13 Weber State Wildcats men's basketball team =

American college basketball season

2012–13 Weber State Wildcats men's basketball

CIT, Runner Up
- Conference: Big Sky Conference
- Record: 30–7 (18–2 Big Sky)
- Head coach: Randy Rahe (7th season)
- Assistant coaches: Eric Duft; Phil Beckner; Keith Berard
- Home arena: Dee Events Center

2012–13 Big Sky men's basketball standings
	Conf.				Overall
Team	W		L	PCT	W		L	PCT
Montana †	19	–	1	.950	25	–	7	.781
Weber State	18	–	2	.900	30	–	7	.811
North Dakota	12	–	8	.600	16	–	17	.485
Montana State	10	–	10	.500	13	–	17	.433
Northern Colorado	10	–	10	.500	13	–	18	.419
Sacramento State	8	–	12	.400	14	–	15	.483
Southern Utah	8	–	12	.400	11	–	20	.355
Northern Arizona	8	–	12	.400	11	–	21	.344
Eastern Washington	7	–	13	.350	10	–	21	.323
Portland State	5	–	15	.250	8	–	20	.286
Idaho State	5	–	15	.250	6	–	24	.200
† Conference tournament winner

The 2012–13 Weber State Wildcats men's basketball team represented Weber State University during the 2012–13 NCAA Division I men's basketball season. The Wildcats, were led by seventh year head coach Randy Rahe and played their home games at the Dee Events Center. They were members of the Big Sky Conference. They finished the season 30–7, 18–2 in Big Sky play to finish in second place. They advanced to the championship game of the Big Sky tournament where they lost to Montana. They were invited to the 2013 CIT where they defeated Cal Poly, Air Force, Oral Roberts and Northern Iowa to advance to the championship game where they lost to East Carolina. They set a school record for wins in a season with 30.

== Roster ==
Number	Name	Position	Height	Weight	Year	Hometown
0	Gelaun Wheelwright	Guard	6–1	195	Sophomore	Corona, California
3	Duce Zaid	Guard	6–2	210	Junior	Los Angeles, California
4	Scott Bamforth	Guard/Forward	6–2	190	Senior	Albuquerque, New Mexico
5	Jordan Richardson	Guard	6–1	185	Junior	Lewisville, Texas
11	Logan Foster	Guard	6–3	160	Freshman	Los Angeles, California
13	Frank Otis	Forward	6–6	220	Senior	Oakland, California
14	Wayne Bradford	Guard	6–3	185	Sophomore	Baltimore, Maryland
15	Davion Berry	Guard/Forward	6–4	185	Junior	Oakland, California
21	Joel Bolomboy	Forward/Center	6–9	210	Freshman	Fort Worth, Texas
24	Kevin Sweat	Guard	6–0	180	Freshman	Los Altos, California
25	Byron Fulton	Forward	6–7	235	Junior	Phoenix, Arizona
32	Royce Williams	Guard/Forward	6–5	195	Sophomore	Los Angeles, California
35	Kyndahl Hill	Forward	6–7	200	Freshman	Humble, Texas
44	Kyle Tresnak	Center	6–10	255	Junior	Scottsdale, Arizona
45	James Hajek	Center	6–10	250	Sophomore	Omaha, Nebraska
50	Jordan Rex	Forward/Center	6–8	230	Junior	St. George, Utah

== Schedule ==
Date time, TV	Opponent	Result	Record	Site (attendance) city, state
Exhibition
11/05/2012*; 8:00 pm, Big Sky TV	Western State	W 82–56		Dee Events Center; Ogden, UT
Regular season
11/09/2012*; 7:00 pm, Big Sky TV	Arizona Christian	W 110–52	1–0	Dee Events Center (4,397); Ogden, UT
11/15/2012*; 8:30 pm	at San Jose State	L 67–68 ^{OT}	1–1	The Event Center Arena (1,236); San Jose, CA
11/24/2012*; 7:00 pm, KMYU/ESPN3	at Utah State; Old Oquirrh Bucket	L 55–65	1–2	Smith Spectrum (8,415); Logan, UT
11/28/2012*; 5:00 pm, WHIO	at Dayton	W 62–61	2–2	University of Dayton Arena (12,176); Dayton, OH
12/05/2012*; 7:00 pm, Big Sky TV	Utah Valley; Old Oquirrh Bucket	W 89–56	3–2	Dee Events Center (5,553); Ogden, UT
12/08/2012*; 7:00 pm, Big Sky TV	UC Irvine	W 65–51	4–2	Dee Events Center (5,761); Ogden, UT
12/15/2012*; 7:00 pm, BYUtv	BYU; Old Oquirrh Bucket	L 68–78	4–3	Dee Events Center (8,695); Ogden, UT
12/20/2012; 7:05 pm, Big Sky TV	at Eastern Washington	W 74–53	5–3 (1–0)	Reese Court (610); Cheney, WA
12/22/2012; 8:35 pm, Big Sky TV	at Portland State	W 73–69 ^{OT}	6–3 (2–0)	Stott Center (802); Portland, OR
12/29/2012*; 7:05 pm, Big Sky TV	Southwest	W 110–45	7–3	Dee Events Center (5,822); Ogden, UT
01/03/2013; 7:05 pm, Big Sky TV	Northern Colorado	W 79–54	8–3 (3–0)	Dee Events Center (5,612); Ogden, UT
01/05/2013; 7:00 pm, Big Sky TV	North Dakota	W 95–63	9–3 (4–0)	Dee Events Center (5,813); Ogden, UT
01/10/2013; 7:05 pm, Big Sky TV	at Southern Utah; Old Oquirrh Bucket	W 81–74	10–3 (5–0)	Centrum Arena (3,914); Cedar City, UT
01/14/2013; 7:05 pm, Big Sky TV	at Idaho State	W 70–54	11–3 (6–0)	Reed Gym (2,093); Pocatello, ID
01/17/2013; 7:05 pm, Big Sky TV	Northern Arizona	W 83–70	12–3 (7–0)	Dee Events Center (6,077); Ogden, UT
01/19/2013; 7:05 pm, Big Sky TV	Sacramento State	W 65–56	13–3 (8–0)	Dee Events Center (6,654); Ogden, UT
01/24/2013; 7:05 pm, Big Sky TV	at Montana State	L 74–79	13–4 (8–1)	Worthington Arena (2,608); Bozeman, MT
01/26/2013; 7:05 pm, Big Sky TV	at Montana	L 74–76	13–5 (8–2)	Dahlberg Arena (5,815); Missoula, MT
01/31/2013; 6:05 pm, Big Sky TV	at North Dakota	W 66–51	14–5 (9–2)	Betty Engelstad Sioux Center (1,599); Grand Forks, ND
02/02/2013; 7:05 pm, Big Sky TV	at Northern Colorado	W 85–64	15–5 (10–2)	Butler–Hancock Sports Pavilion (1,488); Greeley, CO
02/09/2013; 7:00 pm, Big Sky TV	Southern Utah; Old Oquirrh Bucket	W 75–58	16–5 (11–2)	Dee Events Center (7,168); Ogden, UT
02/11/2013; 7:05 pm, ALT2/Big Sky TV	Idaho State	W 56–40	17–5 (12–2)	Dee Events Center (8,758); Ogden, UT
02/14/2013; 7:05 pm, Big Sky TV	Montana	W 87–63	18–5 (13–2)	Dee Events Center (7,494); Ogden, UT
02/16/2013; 7:05 pm, Big Sky TV	Montana State	W 69–61	19–5 (14–2)	Dee Events Center (7,046); Ogden, UT
02/23/2013*; 6:30 pm, FCS Pacific	at Oral Roberts; BracketBusters	W 70–66	20–5	Mabee Center (6,890); Tulsa, OK
02/28/2013; 8:05 pm, Big Sky TV	at Sacramento State	W 70–55	21–5 (15–2)	Colberg Court (1,362); Sacramento, CA
03/02/2013; 2:00 pm, FSAZ+/Big Sky TV	at Northern Arizona	W 80–78 ^{OT}	22–5 (16–2)	Walkup Skydome (1,186); Flagstaff, AZ
03/07/2013; 7:00 pm, Big Sky TV	Portland State	W 80–52	23–5 (17–2)	Dee Events Center (6,835); Ogden, UT
03/09/2013; 7:00 pm, Big Sky TV	Eastern Washington	W 65–57	24–5 (18–2)	Dee Events Center (7,546); Ogden, UT
Big Sky tournament
03/14/2013; 3:00 pm, Big Sky TV	vs. Northern Arizona; Quarterfinals	W 84–58	25–5	Dahlberg Arena (3,333); Missoula, MT
03/15/2013; 5:30 pm, Big Sky TV	vs. North Dakota; Semifinals	W 76–74	26–5	Dahlberg Arena (6,919); Missoula, MT
03/16/2013; 7:00 pm, ESPNU	at Montana; Championship Game	L 64–67	26–6	Dahlberg Arena (7,172); Missoula, MT
CollegeInsider.com tournament
03/20/2013*; 7:00 pm	Cal Poly; First Round	W 85–43	27–6	Dee Events Center (2,309); Ogden, UT
03/23/2013*; 7:00 pm	Air Force; Second Round	W 78–57	28–6	Dee Events Center (6,113); Ogden, UT
03/27/2013*; 7:00 pm	Oral Roberts; Quarterfinals	W 83–74	29–6	Dee Events Center (6,638); Ogden, UT
03/30/2013*; 6:00 pm	at Northern Iowa; Semifinals	W 59–56	30–6	McLeod Center (5,033); Cedar Falls, IA
04/02/2013*; 6:00 pm, CBSSN	East Carolina; Championship Game	L 74–77	30–7	Dee Events Center (10,583); Ogden, UT
*Non-conference game. ^{#}Rankings from AP poll. (#) Tournament seedings in parentheses. All times are in Mountain time.
