= 2012–13 Montana Grizzlies basketball team =

American college basketball season

2012–13 Montana Grizzlies men's basketball

Big Sky Regular Season Champions Big Sky tournament champions

NCAA Tournament, round of 64
- Conference: Big Sky Conference
- Record: 25–7 (19–1 Big Sky)
- Head coach: Wayne Tinkle (7th season)
- Assistant coaches: Jonathan Metzger-Jones; Freddie Owens; Kerry Rupp
- Home arena: Dahlberg Arena

2012–13 Big Sky men's basketball standings
	Conf.				Overall
Team	W		L	PCT	W		L	PCT
Montana †	19	–	1	.950	25	–	7	.781
Weber State	18	–	2	.900	30	–	7	.811
North Dakota	12	–	8	.600	16	–	17	.485
Montana State	10	–	10	.500	13	–	17	.433
Northern Colorado	10	–	10	.500	13	–	18	.419
Sacramento State	8	–	12	.400	14	–	15	.483
Southern Utah	8	–	12	.400	11	–	20	.355
Northern Arizona	8	–	12	.400	11	–	21	.344
Eastern Washington	7	–	13	.350	10	–	21	.323
Portland State	5	–	15	.250	8	–	20	.286
Idaho State	5	–	15	.250	6	–	24	.200
† Conference tournament winner

The 2012–13 Montana Grizzlies basketball team represented the University of Montana during the 2012–13 NCAA Division I men's basketball season. The Grizzlies, led by seventh year head coach Wayne Tinkle, played their home games at Dahlberg Arena and were members of the Big Sky Conference. They finished the season 25–7, 19–1 in Big Sky play to win the Big Sky regular season championship. They were also champions of the Big Sky tournament, winning the championship game over Weber State, to earn the conference's automatic bid to the 2013 NCAA tournament where they lost in the second round to Syracuse 34–81. The 47 win by Syracuse is the most lopsided win by a team seeded 3 or lower in the history of the tournament, breaking a record set only one hour prior when 5 seed VCU defeated 13 seed Akron by 46.

== Roster ==
Number	Name	Position	Height	Weight	Year	Hometown
0	Morgan Young	Guard	6–0	180	Freshman	Lustre, Montana
2	Kevin Henderson	Guard/Forward	6–5	190	Sophomore	Auburn, Washington
5	Will Cherry	Guard	6–1	177	Senior	West Oakland, California
10	Jordan Gregory	Guard	6–2	185	Sophomore	Pueblo, Colorado
12	Jake Wiley	Forward	6–6	205	Freshman	Newport, Washington
15	Nick Emerson	Forward	6–5	200	Freshman	Columbia Falls, Montana
20	Keron DeShields	Guard	6–2	177	Sophomre	Baltimore, Maryland
22	Wes Knox	Guard	6–4		Freshman	Dillon, Montana
24	Spencer Coleman	Forward	6–6.5	210	Junior	Eugene, Oregon
32	Kareem Jamar	Guard/Forward	6–5	210	Junior	Venice, California
33	Michael Weisner	Forward	6–7	185	Sophomore	Walla Walla, Washington
40	Mathias Ward	Forward	6–7	236	Senior	Gig Harbor, Washington
41	Andy Martin	Center	7–0	225	Freshman	Casper, Wyoming
45	Eric Hutchison	Forward	6–9	236	Junior	Longview, Washington

== Schedule ==
Date time, TV	Rank^{#}	Opponent^{#}	Result	Record	Site (attendance) city, state
Exhibition
11/01/2012*; 7:00 pm, Big Sky TV		Lewis–Clark State	W 86–68		Dahlberg Arena (2,764); Missoula, MT
Regular season
11/09/2012*; 7:00 pm		at Colorado State	L 65–72	0–1	Moby Arena (5,833); Fort Collins, CO
11/14/2012*; 7:00 pm, Big Sky TV		Minot State	W 82–53	1–1	Dahlberg Arena (2,748); Missoula, MT
11/17/2012*; 8:00 pm		at Idaho	W 66–63	2–1	Memorial Gym (1,254); Moscow, ID
11/24/2012*; 6:00 pm, Big Sky TV		San Diego	W 67–66	3–1	Dahlberg Arena (3,270); Missoula, MT
11/28/2012*; 7:00 pm, BYUtv		vs. BYU	L 60–85	3–2	EnergySolutions Arena (12,378); Salt Lake City, UT
11/30/2012*; 8:00 pm		at San Francisco	L 68–78	3–3	War Memorial Gymnasium (1,313); San Francisco, CA
12/08/2012*; 7:00 pm, Big Sky TV		Carroll	W 78–58	4–3	Dahlberg Arena (3,198); Missoula, MT
12/15/2012*; 7:00 pm, Big Sky TV		South Dakota State	L 67–68 ^{2OT}	4–4	Dahlberg Arena (3,408); Missoula, MT
12/19/2012; 6:35 pm, NAU-TV/Big Sky TV		at Northern Arizona	W 62–56	5–4 (1–0)	Walkup Skydome (664); Flagstaff, AZ
12/21/2012; 8:05 pm, Big Sky TV		at Sacramento State	W 61–60	6–4 (2–0)	Colberg Court (612); Sacramento, CA
01/03/2013; 7:05 pm, Big Sky TV		Eastern Washington	W 81–66	7–4 (3–0)	Dahlberg Arena (3,269); Missoula, MT
01/05/2013; 7:05 pm, Big Sky TV		Portland State	W 62–55	8–4 (4–0)	Dahlberg Arena (3,907); Missoula, MT
01/10/2013; 6:05 pm, Big Sky TV		at North Dakota	W ^{77–62}	9–4 (5–0)	Betty Engelstad Sioux Center (1,844); Grand Forks, ND
01/12/2013; 4:35 pm, ALT/Big Sky TV		at Northern Colorado	W 85–77	10–4 (6–0)	Butler–Hancock Sports Pavilion (355); Greeley, CO
01/17/2013; 7:05 pm, Big Sky TV		Southern Utah	W 73–67	11–4 (7–0)	Dahlberg Arena (3,202); Missoula, MT
01/19/2013; 7:00 pm, Max Media/Big Sky TV		Montana State	W 76–71 ^{OT}	12–4 (8–0)	Dahlberg Arena (6,022); Missoula, MT
01/24/2013; 7:00 pm, Big Sky TV		Idaho State	W 70–51	13–4 (9–0)	Dahlberg Arena (3,252); Missoula, MT
01/26/2013; 7:05 pm, Big Sky TV		Weber State	W 76–74	14–4 (10–0)	Dahlberg Arena (5,815); Missoula, MT
01/31/2013; 8:35 pm, Big Sky TV		at Portland State	W 81–68	15–4 (11–0)	Stott Center (1,307); Portland, OR
02/02/2013; 7:05 pm, SWX/Big Sky TV		at Eastern Washington	W 65–46	16–4 (12–0)	Reese Court (2,732); Cheney, WA
02/07/2013; 7:00 pm, Big Sky TV		Northern Colorado	W 73–63	17–4 (13–0)	Dahlberg Arena (4,036); Missoula, MT
02/09/2013; 7:05 pm, Big Sky TV		North Dakota	W 78–58	18–4 (14–0)	Dahlberg Arena (5,366); Missoula, MT
02/14/2013; 7:05 pm, Big Sky TV		at Weber State	L 63–87	18–5 (14–1)	Dee Events Center (7,494); Ogden, UT
02/16/2013; 7:05 pm, Big Sky TV		at Idaho State	W 61–54	19–5 (15–1)	Reed Gym (1,922); Pocatello, ID
02/23/2013*; 1:00 pm, ESPNU		at Davidson; BracketBusters	L 87–93 ^{OT}	19–6	John M. Belk Arena (4,897); Davidson, NC
03/02/2013; 7:00 pm, Max Media/Big Sky TV		at Montana State	W 71–68	20–6 (16–1)	Worthington Arena (4,571); Bozeman, MT
03/04/2013; 7:05 pm, Big Sky TV		at Southern Utah	W 86–74 ^{OT}	21–6 (17–1)	Centrum Arena (3,183); Cedar City, UT
03/07/2013; 7:00 pm, Big Sky TV		Sacramento State	W 63–52	22–6 (18–1)	Dahlberg Arena (4,313); Missoula, MT
03/09/2013; 7:00 pm, Big Sky TV		Northern Arizona	W 63–50	23–6 (19–1)	Dahlberg Arena (6,056); Missoula, MT
Big Sky tournament
03/15/2013; 8:00 pm, Big Sky TV		Northern Colorado; Semifinals	W 70–56	24–6	Dahlberg Arena (6,919); Missoula, MT
03/16/2013; 7:00 pm, ESPNU		Weber State; Championship Game	W 67–64	25–6	Dahlberg Arena (7,172); Missoula, MT
NCAA tournament
03/21/2013*; 8:41 pm, truTV	No. (13 E)	vs. No. 16 (4 E) Syracuse; Second Round	L 34–81	25–7	HP Pavilion (17,997); San Jose, CA
*Non-conference game. ^{#}Rankings from AP Poll () Tournament Rank. (#) Tournament seedings in parentheses. All times are in Mountain Time. (#) during NCAA Tournament is Seed with Region E=East.
