= 2012–13 Southern Utah Thunderbirds men's basketball team =

American college basketball season

2012–13 Southern Utah Thunderbirds men's basketball
- Conference: Big Sky Conference
- Record: 11–20 (8–12 Big Sky)
- Head coach: Nick Robinson (1st season)
- Assistant coaches: Jared Barrett; Drew Allen; Todd Okeson
- Home arena: Centrum Arena

2012–13 Big Sky men's basketball standings
	Conf.				Overall
Team	W		L	PCT	W		L	PCT
Montana †	19	–	1	.950	25	–	7	.781
Weber State	18	–	2	.900	30	–	7	.811
North Dakota	12	–	8	.600	16	–	17	.485
Montana State	10	–	10	.500	13	–	17	.433
Northern Colorado	10	–	10	.500	13	–	18	.419
Sacramento State	8	–	12	.400	14	–	15	.483
Southern Utah	8	–	12	.400	11	–	20	.355
Northern Arizona	8	–	12	.400	11	–	21	.344
Eastern Washington	7	–	13	.350	10	–	21	.323
Portland State	5	–	15	.250	8	–	20	.286
Idaho State	5	–	15	.250	6	–	24	.200
† Conference tournament winner

The 2012–13 Southern Utah Thunderbirds basketball team represented Southern Utah University during the 2012–13 NCAA Division I men's basketball season. The Thunderbirds were led by first year head coach Nick Robinson and played their home games at the Centrum Arena. They were members of the Big Sky Conference. They finished the season 11–20, 8–12 in Big Sky play to finish in a three-way tie for sixth place. They lost in the quarterfinals of the Big Sky tournament to North Dakota.

== Roster ==
Number	Name	Position	Height	Weight	Year	Hometown
3	Damon Heuir	Guard	6–2	200	Senior	Townsville, Australia
5	Zach Ghormley	Guard	6–4	185	Freshman	Garland, Texas
10	Matt Gardner	Guard	6–3	180	Sophomore	Spanish Fork, Utah
12	Chris Nsenki	Guard	6–2	180	Sophomore	Kansas City, Missouri
14	Drake Thomas	Guard	6–0	165	Freshman	Ovilla, Texas
21	Jackson Stevenett	Forward	6–4	185	Senior	Kaysville, Utah
22	John Renfro	Forward	6–6	185	Freshman	Fairbanks, Alaska
25	Jordan Johnson	Guard	6–3	175	Senior	Delta, Utah
33	Tyson Koehler	Forward	6–8	250	Senior	Salt Lake City, Utah
34	Cal Hanks	Center	6–11	235	Sophomore	Logan, Utah
35	A.J. Hess	Guard	6–6	190	Freshman	Phoenix, Arizona
42	Jaren Jeffery	Center	6–8	210	Junior	Delta, Utah
44	Julian Scott	Forward	6–8	260	Senior	Sacramento, California
50	Jayson Cheesman	Center	6–11	250	Junior	Orem, Utah

== Schedule ==
Date time, TV	Opponent	Result	Record	Site (attendance) city, state
Regular season
11/09/2012*; 7:00 pm, RTNW	at No. 21 Gonzaga	L 65–103	0–1	McCarthey Athletic Center (6,000); Spokane, WA
11/16/2012*; 9:30 pm	vs. Green Bay; World Vision Classic	L 54–66	0–2	Lawlor Events Center (6,261); Reno, NV
11/17/2012*; 9:30 pm	vs. Cal State Fullerton; World Vision Classic	L 69–112	0–3	Lawlor Events Center (6,691); Reno, NV
11/18/2012*; 4:30 pm	at Nevada; World Vision Classic	L 61–79	0–4	Lawlor Events Center (5,885); Reno, NV
11/21/2012*; 7:00 pm, Big Sky TV	Carroll	W 68–58	1–4	Centrum Arena (1,842); Cedar City, UT
11/29/2012*; 6:00 pm, FSSW	at TCU	L 52–61	1–5	Daniel-Meyer Coliseum (3,867); Fort Worth, TX
12/01/2012*; 7:30 pm, Big Sky TV	San Diego Christian	W 95–65	2–5	Centrum Arena (2,474); Cedar City, UT
12/04/2012*; 7:00 pm, Big Sky TV	San Diego	L 53–67	2–6	Centrum Arena (3,241); Cedar City, UT
12/17/2012; 7:30 pm, Big Sky TV	North Dakota	W 79–67	3–6 (1–0)	Centrum Arena (1,332); Cedar City, UT
12/21/2012*; 4:00 pm	at Denver	L 47–72	3–7	Magness Arena (2,030); Denver, CO
12/29/2012; 7:35 pm, Big Sky TV	Northern Colorado	W 51–50	4–7 (2–0)	Centrum Arena (2,728); Cedar City, UT
01/05/2013; 3:05 pm, NAU-TV/FCS/Big Sky TV	at Northern Arizona	W 90–77	5–7 (3–0)	Walkup Skydome (706); Flagstaff, AZ
01/07/2013; 8:05 pm, Big Sky TV	at Sacramento State	L 59–64	5–8 (3–1)	Colberg Court (405); Sacramento, CA
01/10/2013; 7:05 pm, Big Sky TV	Weber State	L 74–81	5–9 (3–2)	Centrum Arena (3,914); Cedar City, UT
01/12/2013; 7:05 pm, Big Sky TV	Idaho State	L 53–54	5–10 (3–3)	Centrum Arena (2,994); Cedar City, UT
01/17/2013; 7:05 pm, Big Sky TV	at Montana	L 67–73	5–11 (3–4)	Dahlberg Arena (3,202); Missoula, MT
01/21/2013; 7:05 pm, Big Sky TV	at Montana State	L 68–76	5–12 (3–5)	Worthington Arena (2,309); Bozeman, MT
01/24/2013; 7:05 pm, Big Sky TV	Portland State	W 76–63	6–12 (4–5)	Centrum Arena (2,098); Cedar City, UT
01/26/2013; 7:05 pm, Big Sky TV	Eastern Washington	W 69–55	7–12 (5–5)	Centrum Arena (3,081); Cedar City, UT
01/31/2013; 7:05 pm, Big Sky TV	Sacramento State	W 79–67	8–12 (6–5)	Centrum Arena (2,022); Cedar City, UT
02/02/2013; 7:05 pm, Big Sky TV	Northern Arizona	W 78–67	9–12 (7–5)	Centrum Arena (2,301); Cedar City, UT
02/07/2013; 7:05 pm, Big Sky TV	at Idaho State	W 81–79 ^{OT}	10–12 (8–5)	Reed Gym (1,992); Pocatello, ID
02/09/2013; 7:00 pm, Big Sky TV	at Weber State	L 58–75	10–13 (8–6)	Dee Events Center (7,168); Ogden, UT
02/14/2013; 8:35 pm, Big Sky TV	at Portland State	L 69–90	10–14 (8–7)	Stott Center (724); Portland, OR
02/16/2013; 3:05 pm, SWX/Big Sky TV	at Eastern Washington	L 72–86	10–15 (8–8)	Reese Court (1,037); Cheney, WA
02/23/2013*; 7:35 pm	Cal State Northridge; BracketBusters	W 73–72	11–15	Centrum Arena (2,228); Cedar City, UT
02/28/2013; 7:05 pm, Big Sky TV	Montana State	L 61–62	11–16 (8–9)	Centrum Arena (2,431); Cedar City, UT
03/04/2013; 7:05 pm, Big Sky TV	Montana	L 74–86 ^{OT}	11–17 (8–10)	Centrum Arena (3,183); Cedar City, UT
03/07/2013; 7:05 pm, Big Sky TV	at Northern Colorado	L 58–66	11–18 (8–11)	Butler–Hancock Sports Pavilion (1,767); Greeley, CO
03/09/2013; 1:00 pm, Big Sky TV	at North Dakota	L 61–68	11–19 (8–12)	Betty Engelstad Sioux Center (1,737); Grand Forks, ND
2013 Big Sky Conference men's basketball tournament
03/14/2013; 5:30 pm, Big Sky TV	vs. North Dakota; Quarterfinals	L 52–69	11–20	Dahlberg Arena (3,333); Missoula, MT
*Non-conference game. ^{#}Rankings from AP Poll. (#) Tournament seedings in parentheses. All times are in Mountain Time.
