= 2012–13 Sacramento State Hornets men's basketball team =

American college basketball season

2012–13 Sacramento State Hornets men's basketball
- Conference: Big Sky Conference
- Record: 14–15 (8–12 Big Sky)
- Head coach: Brian Katz (5th season)
- Assistant coaches: Brandon Laird; Ajay Riding; Travis Okamoto
- Home arena: Hornets Nest

2012–13 Big Sky men's basketball standings
	Conf.				Overall
Team	W		L	PCT	W		L	PCT
Montana †	19	–	1	.950	25	–	7	.781
Weber State	18	–	2	.900	30	–	7	.811
North Dakota	12	–	8	.600	16	–	17	.485
Montana State	10	–	10	.500	13	–	17	.433
Northern Colorado	10	–	10	.500	13	–	18	.419
Sacramento State	8	–	12	.400	14	–	15	.483
Southern Utah	8	–	12	.400	11	–	20	.355
Northern Arizona	8	–	12	.400	11	–	21	.344
Eastern Washington	7	–	13	.350	10	–	21	.323
Portland State	5	–	15	.250	8	–	20	.286
Idaho State	5	–	15	.250	6	–	24	.200
† Conference tournament winner

The 2012–13 Sacramento State Hornets men's basketball team represented California State University, Sacramento during the 2012–13 NCAA Division I men's basketball season. The Hornets were led by fifth year head coach Brian Katz and played their home games at Hornets Nest. They were members of the Big Sky Conference. They finished the season 14–15, 8–12 in Big Sky play to finish in a three way tie for sixth place. They failed to qualify for the Big Sky tournament.

== Roster ==
Number	Name	Position	Height	Weight	Year	Hometown
0	Jordan Estrada	Guard	6–1	190	Senior	Concord, California
1	Jackson Carbajal	Guard	6–3	190	Junior	Clovis, California
2	Cody Demps	Guard	6–4	185	Freshman	Elk Grove, California
3	Joe Eberhard	Guard/Forward	6–6	210	Senior	Newport Beach, California
4	Joey Quigley	Forward	6–8	210	Junior	Kansas City, Missouri
5	Dylan Garrity	Guard	6–2	175	Sophomore	Huntington Beach, California
10	Mikh McKinney	Guard	6–1	165	Sophomore	Union City, California
11	Julian Demalleville	Guard	6–2	190	Senior	San Luis Obispo, California
12	Kendell Groom	Guard	6–3	175	Junior	New Haven, Connecticut
15	Ryan Okwudibonye	Center	6–8	230	Junior	Huntington Beach, California
20	Dreon Barlett	Guard	6–3	170	Freshman	Pasadena, California
22	Jordan Salley	Forward	6–6	230	Junior	La Verne, California
32	John Dickson	Forward	6–6	200	Senior	San Francisco, California
34	Alex Tiffin	Forward	6–9	235	Junior	Thousand Oaks, California
41	Konner Veteto	Center	6–8	290	Senior	Auburn, California

== Schedule ==
Date time, TV	Opponent	Result	Record	Site (attendance) city, state
Exhibition
10/30/2012*; 7:00 pm	Simpson	W 88–55		Hornets Nest (385); Sacramento, CA
Regular season
11/09/2012*; 7:00 pm	UC Merced	W 96–62	1–0	Hornets Nest (598); Sacramento, CA
11/14/2012*; 7:00 pm	Cal State Bakersfield	W 85–67	2–0	Hornets Nest (492); Sacramento, CA
11/16/2012*; 6:00 pm, P12N	at Utah	W 74–71	3–0	Jon M. Huntsman Center (6,263); Salt Lake City, UT
11/20/2012*; 7:30 pm	UC Davis	L 76–87	3–1	Hornets Nest (1,269); Sacramento, CA
11/24/2012*; 5:00 pm	at Central Arkansas	W 71–68	4–1	Farris Center (729); Conway, AR
11/27/2012*; 7:00 pm	Dominican	W 77–68	5–1	Hornets Nest (550); Sacramento, CA
12/01/2012*; 5:30 pm, P12N	at Arizona State	L 70–90	5–2	Wells Fargo Arena (5,007); Tempe, AZ
12/08/2012*; 4:30 pm	at San Jose State	L 57–62	5–3	Event Center Arena (1,442); San Jose, CA
12/19/2012; 7:05 pm	Montana State	W 62–57	6–3 (1–0)	Hornets Nest (523); Sacramento, CA
12/21/2012; 7:05 pm	Montana	L 60–61	6–4 (1–1)	Hornets Nest (612); Sacramento, CA
01/03/2013; 5:35 pm	at Northern Arizona	L 50–57	6–5 (1–2)	Walkup Skydome (657); Flagstaff, AZ
01/07/2013; 7:05 pm	Southern Utah	W 64–59	7–5 (2–2)	Hornets Nest (405); Sacramento, CA
01/10/2013; 7:35 pm	at Portland State	L 69–87	7–6 (2–3)	Stott Center (807); Portland, OR
01/12/2013; 6:05 pm	at Eastern Washington	W 60–53	8–6 (3–3)	Reese Court (1,006); Cheney, WA
01/17/2013; 6:05 pm	at Idaho State	L 59–60	8–7 (3–4)	Reed Gym (1,726); Pocatello, ID
01/19/2013; 6:05 pm	at Weber State	L 56–65	8–8 (3–5)	Dee Events Center (6,654); Ogden, UT
01/24/2013; 7:05 pm	North Dakota	W 67–58	9–8 (4–5)	Hornets Nest (681); Sacramento, CA
01/26/2013; 7:05 pm	Northern Colorado	W 79–72	10–8 (5–5)	Hornets Nest (684); Sacramento, CA
01/31/2013; 6:05 pm	at Southern Utah	L 67–79	10–9 (5–6)	Centrum Arena (2,022); Cedar City, UT
02/04/2013; 7:05 pm	Northern Arizona	L 61–62	10–10 (5–7)	Hornets Nest (454); Sacramento, CA
02/07/2013; 7:05 pm	Eastern Washington	W 61–55	11–10 (6–7)	Hornets Nest (859); Sacramento, CA
02/09/2013; 7:05 pm	Portland State	W 77–71	12–10 (7–7)	Hornets Nest (786); Sacramento, CA
02/14/2013; 5:05 pm	at North Dakota	L 48–49	12–11 (7–8)	Betty Engelstad Sioux Center (1,692); Grand Forks, ND
02/16/2013; 6:05 pm	at Northern Colorado	L 64–78	12–12 (7–9)	Butler–Hancock Sports Pavilion (1,540); Greeley, CO
02/23/2013*; 7:00 pm	at UC Santa Barbara; BracketBusters	W 51–50	13–12	The Thunderdome (1,758); Santa Barbara, CA
02/28/2013; 7:05 pm	Weber State	L 55–70	13–13 (7–10)	Hornets Nest (1,362); Sacramento, CA
03/02/2013; 7:05 pm	Idaho State	W 53–52	14–13 (8–10)	Hornets Nest (897); Sacramento, CA
03/07/2013; 6:00 pm	at Montana	L 52–63	14–14 (8–11)	Dahlberg Arena (4,313); Missoula, MT
03/09/2013; 1:30 pm	at Montana State	L 55–71	14–15 (8–12)	Worthington Arena (2,503); Bozeman, MT
*Non-conference game. ^{#}Rankings from AP Poll. (#) Tournament seedings in parentheses. All times are in Pacific Time.
