= 2012–13 Montana State Bobcats men's basketball team =

American college basketball season

2012–13 Montana State Bobcats men's basketball
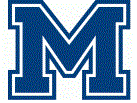
- Conference: Big Sky Conference
- Record: 13–17 (10–10 Big Sky)
- Head coach: Brad Huse (7th season)
- Assistant coaches: Scott Carson; Aerick Sanders; Shawn Dirden
- Home arena: Worthington Arena

2012–13 Big Sky men's basketball standings
	Conf.				Overall
Team	W		L	PCT	W		L	PCT
Montana †	19	–	1	.950	25	–	7	.781
Weber State	18	–	2	.900	30	–	7	.811
North Dakota	12	–	8	.600	16	–	17	.485
Montana State	10	–	10	.500	13	–	17	.433
Northern Colorado	10	–	10	.500	13	–	18	.419
Sacramento State	8	–	12	.400	14	–	15	.483
Southern Utah	8	–	12	.400	11	–	20	.355
Northern Arizona	8	–	12	.400	11	–	21	.344
Eastern Washington	7	–	13	.350	10	–	21	.323
Portland State	5	–	15	.250	8	–	20	.286
Idaho State	5	–	15	.250	6	–	24	.200
† Conference tournament winner

The 2012–13 Montana State Bobcats men's basketball team represented Montana State University during the 2012–13 NCAA Division I men's basketball season. The Bobcats, led by seventh year head coach Brad Huse, played their home games at Worthington Arena and were members of the Big Sky Conference. They finished the season 13–17, 10–10 in Big Sky play to finish in a tie for fourth place. They lost in the quarterfinals of the Big Sky tournament where they lost to Northern Colorado.

== Roster ==
Number	Name	Position	Height	Weight	Year	Hometown
1	Jamie Steward	Guard	6–4	200	Senior	Detroit, Michigan
2	Blake Brumwell	Center	6–7	250	Sophomore	Big Sandy, Montana
3	Michael Dison	Guard	5–9	160	Sophomore	Houston, Texas
4	Paul Egwuonwu	Center	6–9	235	Junior	Boise, Idaho
5	Antonio Biglow	Guard	6–0	165	Junior	Los Angeles, California
12	Marcus Colbert	Guard	5–11	180	Freshman	Post Falls, Idaho
15	Flavien Davis	Forward	6–5	225	Junior	Milwaukee, Wisconsin
20	Ryan Shannon	Forward	6–8	225	Freshman	Marysville, Washington
21	Danny Robison	Forward	6–8	225	Freshman	Billings, Montana
23	Xavier Blount	Guard	6–4	205	Senior	Virginia Beach, Virginia
24	Eric Norman	Forward	6–9	220	Sophomore	San Diego, California
32	Steven Davis	Forward	6–7	235	Junior	Billings, Montana
33	Christian Moon	Guard	6–2	175	Senior	Inkster, Michigan
40	Jeff Budinich	Forward	6–10	250	Junior	Maple Valley, Washington
42	Mitchell Schwab	Forward	6–4	190	Freshman	Afton, Wyoming
44	Calen Coleman	Forward	6–4	200	Junior	Bakersfield, California

== Schedule ==
Date time, TV	Opponent	Result	Record	Site (attendance) city, state
Exhibition
11/03/2012*; 7:00 pm	South Dakota S&T	W 93–61	–	Worthington Arena (N/A); Bozeman, MT
Regular season
11/11/2012*; 6:00 pm, RTNW	at Seattle	L 72–87	0–1	KeyArena (2,750); Seattle, WA
11/18/2012*; 1:00 pm	Portland	W 83–64	1–1	Worthington Arena (1,632); Bozeman, MT
11/21/2012*; 7:00 pm	at Air Force	L 72–86	1–2	Clune Arena (1,851); Colorado Springs, CO
11/25/2012*; 4:00 pm, Pac-12	at Oregon State	L 65–78	1–3	Gill Coliseum (5,224); Corvallis, OR
11/29/2012*; 8:00 pm	Pepperdine	L 66–76	1–4	Worthington Arena (2,472); Bozeman, MT
12/01/2012*; 7:00 pm	San Jose State	L 74–82	1–5	Worthington Arena (2,242); Bozeman, MT
12/06/2012*; 7:00 pm	Montana Tech	W 78–54	2–5	Worthington Arena (2,149); Bozeman, MT
12/17/2012; 6:35 pm, FCS	at Northern Arizona	L 80–87	2–6 (0–1)	Walkup Skydome (712); Flagstaff, AZ
12/19/2012; 8:05 pm	at Sacramento State	L 57–62	2–7 (0–2)	Colberg Court (523); Sacramento, CA
12/29/2012*; 7:00 pm	Northwest Indian	W 101–70	3–7	Worthington Arena (2,353); Bozeman, MT
01/03/2013; 7:05 pm	Portland State	W 62–59	4–7 (1–2)	Worthington Arena (2,106); Bozeman, MT
01/05/2013; 7:05 pm	Eastern Washington	W 70–68 ^{OT}	5–7 (2–2)	Worthington Arena (2,248); Bozeman, MT
01/10/2013; 7:05 pm, ALT	at Northern Colorado	W 69–66	6–7 (3–2)	Butler–Hancock Sports Pavilion (1,023); Greeley, CO
01/12/2013; 2:05 pm	at North Dakota	L 73–86	6–8 (3–3)	Betty Engelstad Sioux Center (1,897); Grand Forks, ND
01/19/2013; 7:00 pm, Max Media	at Montana	L 71–76 ^{OT}	6–9 (3–4)	Dahlberg Arena (6,022); Missoula, MT
01/21/2013; 7:05 pm	Southern Utah	W 76–68	7–9 (4–4)	Worthington Arena (2,309); Bozeman, MT
01/24/2013; 7:05 pm	Weber State	W 79–74	8–9 (5–4)	Worthington Arena (2,608); Bozeman, MT
01/26/2013; 7:05 pm	Idaho State	W 61–59 ^{OT}	9–9 (6–4)	Worthington Arena (3,340); Bozeman, MT
01/31/2013; 7:05 pm	at Eastern Washington	L 68–72	9–10 (6–5)	Reese Court (1,330); Cheney, WA
02/02/2013; 8:35 pm	at Portland State	W 70–64	10–10 (7–5)	Stott Center (921); Portland, OR
02/07/2013; 7:05 pm	North Dakota	L 73–82	10–11 (7–6)	Worthington Arena (2,344); Bozeman, MT
02/09/2013; 7:00 pm	Northern Colorado	L 72–85	10–12 (7–7)	Worthington Arena (2,808); Bozeman, MT
02/14/2013; 7:05 pm	at Idaho State	L 51–87	10–13 (7–8)	Reed Gym (1,660); Pocatello, ID
02/16/2013; 7:05 pm	at Weber State	L 61–69	10–14 (7–9)	Dee Events Center (7,046); Ogden, UT
02/24/2013*; 1:00 pm	South Dakota; BracketBusters	L 74–85	10–15	Worthington Arena (2,117); Bozeman, MT
02/28/2013; 7:05 pm	at Southern Utah	W 62–61	11–15 (8–9)	Centrum Arena (2,431); Cedar City, UT
03/02/2013; 7:00 pm, Max Media	Montana	L 68–71	11–16 (8–10)	Worthington Arena (4,571); Bozeman, MT
03/07/2013; 8:00 pm	Northern Arizona	W 83–79 ^{OT}	12–16 (9–10)	Worthington Arena (2,561); Bozeman, MT
03/09/2013; 2:30 pm	Sacramento State	W 71–55	13–16 (10–10)	Worthington Arena (2,503); Bozeman, MT
2013 Big Sky Conference men's basketball tournament
03/14/2013; 8:00 pm	vs. Northern Colorado; Quarterfinals	L 56–69	13–17	Dahlberg Arena (3,333); Missoula, MT
*Non-conference game. ^{#}Rankings from AP Poll. (#) Tournament seedings in parentheses. All times are in Mountain Time.
