= 2012–13 Northern Arizona Lumberjacks men's basketball team =

American college basketball season

2012–13 Northern Arizona Lumberjacks men's basketball
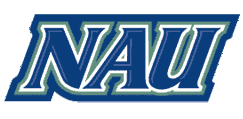
- Conference: Big Sky Conference
- Record: 11–21 (8–12 Big Sky)
- Head coach: Jack Murphy (1st season)
- Assistant coaches: Matt Dunn; Vic Sfera; Al LaRocque
- Home arena: Walkup Skydome; Rolle Activity Center

2012–13 Big Sky men's basketball standings
	Conf.				Overall
Team	W		L	PCT	W		L	PCT
Montana †	19	–	1	.950	25	–	7	.781
Weber State	18	–	2	.900	30	–	7	.811
North Dakota	12	–	8	.600	16	–	17	.485
Montana State	10	–	10	.500	13	–	17	.433
Northern Colorado	10	–	10	.500	13	–	18	.419
Sacramento State	8	–	12	.400	14	–	15	.483
Southern Utah	8	–	12	.400	11	–	20	.355
Northern Arizona	8	–	12	.400	11	–	21	.344
Eastern Washington	7	–	13	.350	10	–	21	.323
Portland State	5	–	15	.250	8	–	20	.286
Idaho State	5	–	15	.250	6	–	24	.200
† Conference tournament winner

The 2012–13 Northern Arizona Lumberjacks men's basketball team represented Northern Arizona University during the 2012–13 NCAA Division I men's basketball season. The Lumberjacks, led by first year head coach Jack Murphy, played their home games at the Walkup Skydome, with two home games at the Rolle Activity Center, and were members of the Big Sky Conference. They finished the season 11–21, 8–12 in Big Sky play to finish in a three-way tie for sixth place. They lost in the quarterfinals of the Big Sky tournament to Weber State.

== Roster ==
Number	Name	Position	Height	Weight	Year	Hometown
1	Blake Hamilton	Guard/forward	6–5	190	Freshman	Pasadena, California
2	Michael Dunn	Guard	6–0	180	Senior	Chandler, Arizona
10	Chris Heine	Guard	6–1	175	Junior	Phoenix, Arizona
11	Gabe Rogers	Guard	6–2	175	Senior	Houston, Texas
12	DeWayne Russell	Guard	5–11	155	Freshman	Peoria, Arizona
20	Gaellan Bewernick	Forward	6–6	215	Sophomore	Los Angeles, California
21	Stallon Saldivar	Guard	6–0	185	Senior	Salt Lake City, Utah
23	Luis Flores	Guard	6–3	175	Senior	Scottsdale, Arizona
30	Bryce Gosar	Guard	6–1	178	Freshman	Phoenix, Arizona
32	Len Springs	Forward/center	6–10	220	Junior	Compton, California
33	Max Jacobsen	Forward	6–8	230	Junior	Lake Oswego, Oregon
34	Jordyn Martin	Forward	6–7	210	Freshman	Las Vegas, Nevada
40	Ben Olayinka	Forward	6–7	218	Senior	Corvallis, Oregon
42	Ephraim Ekanem	Forward	6–7	230	Senior	Chino, California
50	Nick Wahl	Center	6–9	230	Freshman	Los Gatos, California

== Schedule ==
Date time, TV	Opponent	Result	Record	Site (attendance) city, state
Exhibition
10/27/2012*; 7:00 pm	Haskell	W 81–60		Rolle Activity Center (496); Flagstaff, AZ
11/03/2012*; 1:00 pm	Adams State	W 86–78		Rolle Activity Center (378); Flagstaff, AZ
Regular season
11/10/2012*; 5:30 pm, P12N	at Oregon; Global Sports Classic	L 73–83	0–1	Matthew Knight Arena (5,768); Eugene, OR
11/12/2012*; 8:00 pm	at No. 18 UNLV; Global Sports Classic	L 54–92	0–2	Thomas & Mack Center (18,187); Paradise, NV
11/18/2012*; 3:00 pm	at UC Davis	W 85–82	1–2	The Pavilion (1,345); Davis, CA
11/23/2012*; 11:00 am	vs. Jacksonville State; Global Sports Classic	L 48–50	1–3	Thomas & Mack Center (N/A); Paradise, NV
11/24/2012*; 12:00 pm	vs. Campbell; Global Sports Classic	W 70–62	2–3	Thomas & Mack Center (N/A); Paradise, NV
11/28/2012*; 8:00 pm, P12N	at No. 9 Arizona	L 50–93	2–4	McKale Center (13,003); Tucson, AZ
12/01/2012*; 4:30 pm, FSAZ+	Sam Houston State	W 77–60	3–4	Walkup Skydome (1,807); Flagstaff, AZ
12/05/2012*; 6:30 pm, FCS	Loyola Marymount	L 86–92 ^{OT}	3–5	Walkup Skydome (1,245); Flagstaff, AZ
12/17/2012; 6:35 pm, FSAZ+	Montana State	W 87–80	4–5 (1–0)	Walkup Skydome (712); Flagstaff, AZ
12/19/2012; 6:35 pm, FSAZ+	Montana	L 56–62	4–6 (1–1)	Walkup Skydome (664); Flagstaff, AZ
12/21/2012*; 6:30 pm, P12N	at Colorado	L 51–98	4–7	Coors Events Center (10,034); Boulder, CO
12/27/2012*; 7:00 pm, BYUtv	at BYU	L 54–84	4–8	Marriott Center (17,342); Provo, UT
01/03/2013; 6:35 pm, FSAZ	Sacramento State	W 57–50	5–8 (2–1)	Walkup Skydome (657); Flagstaff, AZ
01/05/2013; 3:05 pm, FSAZ	Southern Utah	L 77–90	5–9 (2–2)	Walkup Skydome (706); Flagstaff, AZ
01/10/2013; 7:05 pm	at Eastern Washington	L 59–82	5–10 (2–3)	Reese Court (1,010); Cheney, WA
01/12/2013; 8:35 pm	at Portland State	L 74–79	5–11 (2–4)	Stott Center (844); Portland, OR
01/17/2013; 7:05 pm	at Weber State	L 70–83	5–12 (2–5)	Dee Events Center (6,077); Ogden, UT
01/19/2013; 7:05 pm	at Idaho State	W 60–55	6–12 (3–5)	Reed Gym (2,186); Pocatello, ID
01/24/2013; 6:35 pm, FSAZ	Northern Colorado	W 67–65	7–12 (4–5)	Walkup Skydome (853); Flagstaff, AZ
01/26/2013; 2:05 pm, FSAZ+	North Dakota	L 79–81	7–13 (4–6)	Walkup Skydome (1,601); Flagstaff, AZ
02/02/2013; 7:05 pm	at Southern Utah	L 67–78	7–14 (4–7)	Centrum Arena (2,301); Cedar City, UT
02/04/2013; 8:05 pm	at Sacramento State	W 62–61	8–14 (5–7)	Colberg Court (454); Sacramento, CA
02/07/2013; 6:35 pm, FCS	Portland State	W 79–72	9–14 (6–7)	Walkup Skydome (1,156); Flagstaff, AZ
02/09/2013; 1:05 pm, FSAZ	Eastern Washington	L 74–77 ^{OT}	9–15 (6–8)	Walkup Skydome (1,379); Flagstaff, AZ
02/14/2013; 7:00 pm	at Northern Colorado	L 68–76	9–16 (6–9)	Butler–Hancock Sports Pavilion (1,251); Greeley, CO
02/16/2013; 1:05 pm	at North Dakota	W 74–72 ^{OT}	10–16 (7–9)	Betty Engelstad Sioux Center (1,617); Grand Forks, ND
02/23/2013*; 8:00 pm	at Hawaiʻi; BracketBusters	L 50–84	10–17	Stan Sheriff Center (6,795); Honolulu, HI
02/28/2013; 6:35 pm, FSAZ	Idaho State	W 67–58	11–17 (8–9)	Walkup Skydome (923); Flagstaff, AZ
03/02/2013; 2:00 pm, FSAZ+	Weber State	L 78–80 ^{OT}	11–18 (8–10)	Walkup Skydome (1,186); Flagstaff, AZ
03/07/2013; 8:00 pm	at Montana State	L 79–83 ^{OT}	11–19 (8–11)	Worthington Arena (2,561); Bozeman, MT
03/09/2013; 7:00 pm	at Montana	L 50–63	11–20 (8–12)	Dahlberg Arena (6,056); Missoula, MT
2013 Big Sky Conference men's basketball tournament
03/14/2013; 3:00 pm	vs. Weber State; Quarterfinals	L 58–84	11–21	Dahlberg Arena (3,333); Missoula, MT
*Non-conference game. ^{#}Rankings from AP Poll. (#) Tournament seedings in parentheses. All times are in Mountain Time.
