= 2012–13 Portland State Vikings men's basketball team =

American college basketball season

2012–13 Portland State Vikings men's basketball
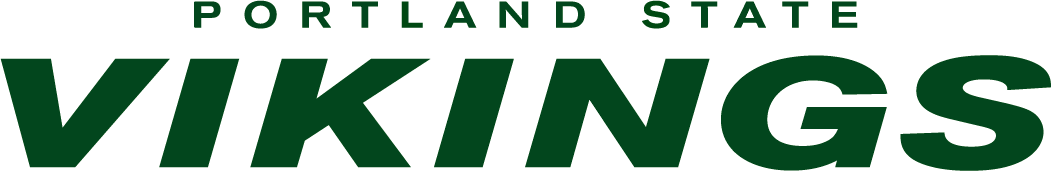
- Conference: Big Sky Conference
- Record: 8–20 (5–15 Big Sky)
- Head coach: Tyler Geving (4th season)
- Assistant coaches: Andy McClouskey; Eric Harper; Anthony Owens
- Home arena: Stott Center

2012–13 Big Sky men's basketball standings
	Conf.				Overall
Team	W		L	PCT	W		L	PCT
Montana †	19	–	1	.950	25	–	7	.781
Weber State	18	–	2	.900	30	–	7	.811
North Dakota	12	–	8	.600	16	–	17	.485
Montana State	10	–	10	.500	13	–	17	.433
Northern Colorado	10	–	10	.500	13	–	18	.419
Sacramento State	8	–	12	.400	14	–	15	.483
Southern Utah	8	–	12	.400	11	–	20	.355
Northern Arizona	8	–	12	.400	11	–	21	.344
Eastern Washington	7	–	13	.350	10	–	21	.323
Portland State	5	–	15	.250	8	–	20	.286
Idaho State	5	–	15	.250	6	–	24	.200
† Conference tournament winner

The 2012–13 Portland State Vikings men's basketball team represented Portland State University during the 2012–13 NCAA Division I men's basketball season. The Vikings, led by fourth year head coach Tyler Geving, played their home games at the Peter Stott Center and were members of the Big Sky Conference. They finished the season 8–20, 5–15 in Big Sky play to finish in a tie for tenth place. They failed to qualify for the Big Sky tournament.

== Roster ==
Number	Name	Position	Height	Weight	Year	Hometown
1	Lateef McMullan	Guard	5–11	170	Senior	Tulsa, Oklahoma
2	Marcus Hall	Guard	6–4	200	Junior	Bakersfield, California
3	Dre Winston, Jr.	Guard	6–1	170	Sophomore	Lakewood, Washington
4	Michael Harthun	Guard	6–3	185	Senior	Medford, Oregon
11	Jordan Ellis	Guard	6–1	185	Sophomore	Medford, Oregon
12	Alyx Foster	Guard	6–3	180	Junior	Phoenix, Arizona
13	Michael Harvey	Forward	6–5	195	Senior	Montgomery, Alabama
14	Gary Winston	Guard	6–0	190	Sophomore	Walla Walla, Washington
15	Tim Douglas	Guard	5–10	160	Junior	Cerritos, California
21	Aaron Moore	Forward	6–8	215	Junior	Riverside, California
23	Martin Whitmore	Forward	6–5	195	Senior	Los Angeles, California
30	Renado Parker	Forward	6–5	245	Senior	Kent, Washington
34	Joel King	Guard	6–3	185	Sophomore	Lacey, Washington
42	Lamont Prosser	Center	6–8	275	Junior	Fort Wayne, Indiana
44	Brandon Cataldo	Center	6–10	290	Sophomore	Rainier, Oregon

== Schedule ==
Date time, TV	Opponent	Result	Record	Site (attendance) city, state
Exhibition
11/02/2012*; 8:00 pm	Concordia (OR)	W 96–93		Stott Center (1,052); Portland, OR
Regular season
11/09/2012*; 8:00 pm	Pacific (OR)	W 77–58	1–0	Stott Center (1,027); Portland, OR
11/12/2012*; 6:30 pm, P12N	at Oregon	L 69–80	1–1	Matthew Knight Arena (5,577); Eugene, OR
11/21/2012*; 7:00 pm	at Portland	L 60–81	1–2	Chiles Center (1,224); Portland, OR
11/25/2012*; 11:00 am	at No. 20 Oklahoma State	L 58–81	1–3	Gallagher-Iba Arena (8,219); Stillwater, OK
12/01/2012*; 5:00 pm	at Loyola Marymount	L 56–66	1–4	Gersten Pavilion (2,592); Los Angeles, CA
12/12/2012*; 7:35 pm, CSNNW	Oregon State	L 74–79	1–5	Stott Center (1,500); Portland, OR
12/15/2012*; 7:35 pm	George Fox	W 85–74	2–5	Stott Center (708); Portland, OR
12/20/2012; 7:35 pm	Idaho State	W 63–49	3–5 (1–0)	Stott Center (659); Portland, OR
12/22/2012; 7:35 pm	Weber State	L 69–73 ^{OT}	3–6 (1–1)	Stott Center (802); Portland, OR
01/03/2013; 6:05 pm	at Montana State	L 59–62	3–7 (1–2)	Worthington Arena (2,106); Bozeman, MT
01/05/2013; 6:05 pm	at Montana	L 55–62	3–8 (1–3)	Dahlberg Arena (3,907); Missoula, MT
01/10/2013; 7:35 pm	Sacramento State	W 87–69	4–8 (2–3)	Stott Center (807); Portland, OR
01/12/2013; 7:35 pm	Northern Arizona	W 79–74	5–8 (3–3)	Stott Center (844); Portland, OR
01/17/2013; 6:05 pm	at Northern Colorado	L 50–67	5–9 (3–4)	Butler–Hancock Sports Pavilion (1,341); Greeley, CO
01/19/2013; 12:05 pm	at North Dakota	L 76–85	5–10 (3–5)	Betty Engelstad Sioux Center (1,519); Grand Forks, ND
01/24/2013; 6:05 pm	at Southern Utah	L 63–76	5–11 (3–6)	Centrum Arena (2,098); Cedar City, UT
01/28/2013; 6:05 pm	at Eastern Washington	L 65–76	5–12 (3–7)	Reese Court (1,214); Cheney, WA
01/31/2013; 7:35 pm	Montana	L 68–81	5–13 (3–8)	Stott Center (1,307); Portland, OR
02/02/2013; 7:35 pm	Montana State	L 64–70	5–14 (3–9)	Stott Center (921); Portland, OR
02/07/2013; 5:35 pm	at Northern Arizona	L 72–79	5–15 (3–10)	Walkup Skydome (1,156); Flagstaff, AZ
02/09/2013; 7:05 pm	at Sacramento State	L 71–77	5–16 (3–11)	Colberg Court (786); Sacramento, CA
02/14/2013; 7:35 pm	Southern Utah	W 90–69	6–16 (4–11)	Stott Center (724); Portland, OR
02/18/2013; 7:35 pm	at Eastern Washington	W 89–80	7–16 (5–11)	Stott Center (810); Portland, OR
02/23/2013*; 1:05 pm	UC Riverside; BracketBusters	W 66–58	8–16	Stott Center (870); Portland, OR
02/28/2013; 7:35 pm	at North Dakota	L 66–74	8–17 (5–12)	Stott Center (863); Portland, OR
03/02/2013; 7:35 pm	at Northern Colorado	L 75–85	8–18 (5–13)	Stott Center (961); Portland, OR
03/07/2013; 6:00 pm	at Weber State	L 52–80	8–19 (5–14)	Dee Events Center (6,835); Ogden, UT
03/09/2013; 6:05 pm	at Idaho State	L 71–72	8–20 (5–15)	Holt Arena (2,018); Pocatello, ID
*Non-conference game. ^{#}Rankings from AP Poll. (#) Tournament seedings in parentheses. All times are in Pacific Time.
