= 2012–13 Idaho State Bengals men's basketball team =

American college basketball season

2012–13 Idaho State Bengals men's basketball
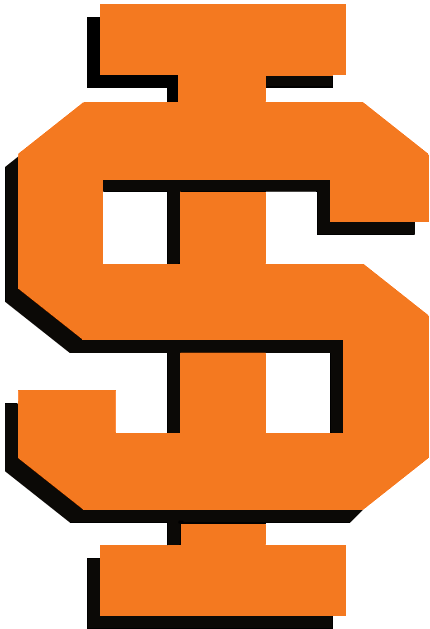
- Conference: Big Sky Conference
- Record: 6–24 (5–15 Big Sky)
- Head coach: Bill Evans (1st season)
- Assistant coaches: Andy Ward; Jay Collins; Tim Walsh
- Home arena: Reed Gym; Holt Arena

2012–13 Big Sky men's basketball standings
	Conf.				Overall
Team	W		L	PCT	W		L	PCT
Montana †	19	–	1	.950	25	–	7	.781
Weber State	18	–	2	.900	30	–	7	.811
North Dakota	12	–	8	.600	16	–	17	.485
Montana State	10	–	10	.500	13	–	17	.433
Northern Colorado	10	–	10	.500	13	–	18	.419
Sacramento State	8	–	12	.400	14	–	15	.483
Southern Utah	8	–	12	.400	11	–	20	.355
Northern Arizona	8	–	12	.400	11	–	21	.344
Eastern Washington	7	–	13	.350	10	–	21	.323
Portland State	5	–	15	.250	8	–	20	.286
Idaho State	5	–	15	.250	6	–	24	.200
† Conference tournament winner

The 2012–13 Idaho State Bengals men's basketball team represented Idaho State University during the 2012–13 NCAA Division I men's basketball season. The Bengals, led by first year head coach Bill Evans, played their home games at Reed Gym, with three home games at Holt Arena, and were members of the Big Sky Conference. They finished the season 6–24, 5–15 in Big Sky play to finish in a tie for tenth place. They failed to qualify for the Big Sky tournament.

== Roster ==
Number	Name	Position	Height	Weight	Year	Hometown
1	Tomas Sanchez	Guard	6–3	185	Junior	Seattle, Washington
3	Melvin Morgan	Guard	5–11	168	Senior	Memphis, Tennessee
4	Brian Hosman	Guard	6–4	220	Freshman	Buhl, Idaho
5	Sherrod Baldwin	Guard	6–0	195	Senior	Memphis, Tennessee
10	Nick Mason	Guard	6–1	180	Junior	Memphis, Tennessee
12	Grant Jones	Guard	6–4	200	Freshman	Twin Falls, Idaho
13	Jakub Kuśmieruk	Center	7–4	265	Senior	Łódź, Poland
15	Andre' Hatchett	Guard	6–4	185	Junior	Tucson, Arizona
20	Chris Hansen	Guard/Forward	6–4	220	Sophomore	Fort Collins, Colorado
21	Nnamdi Ezenwa	Forward	6–6	204	Junior	El Paso, Texas
22	Andy Harrington	Guard	6–2	167	Sophomore	Boise, Idaho
23	Neveij Walters	Forward/Center	6–6	238	Senior	Manchester, Jamaica
25	Avibakuro Preh	Center	6–9	218	Junior	Kano, Nigeria
31	Clint Thomas	Guard	6–1	185	Freshman	McCall, Idaho
40	Dejan Kostur	Forward	6–8	215	Junior	Melbourne, Australia

== Schedule ==
Date time, TV	Opponent	Result	Record	Site (attendance) city, state
Exhibition
11/01/2012*; 7:00 pm	Montana Tech	W 71–41		Reed Gym; Pocatello, ID
11/06/2012*; 7:00 pm	Whitworth	W 68–65		Reed Gym (1,563); Pocatello, ID
Regular season
11/10/2012*; 7:00 pm, KMYU	at Utah State	L 48–56	0–1	Smith Spectrum (9,607); Logan, UT
11/15/2012*; 7:00 pm	at Portland	L 48–51	0–2	Chiles Center (1,216); Portland, OR
11/21/2012*; 7:00 pm, Pac-12	at Utah; Utah Thanksgiving Tournament	L 46–57	0–3	Jon M. Huntsman Center (7,898); Salt Lake City, UT
11/23/2012*; 7:00 pm	vs. Wright State; Utah Thanksgiving Tournament	L 45–60	0–4	Jon M. Huntsman Center (7,599); Salt Lake City, UT
11/24/2012*; 4:30 pm	vs. Central Michigan; Utah Thanksgiving Tournament	L 52–54	0–5	Jon M. Huntsman Center (7,649); Salt Lake City, UT
11/29/2012*; 7:00 pm	Montana Western	W 70–52	1–5	Holt Arena (1,796); Pocatello, ID
12/08/2012*; 4:00 pm, Pac-12 Network	Oregon	L 35–87	1–6	Matthew Knight Arena (5,328); Eugene, OR
12/13/2012*; 8:05 pm	at Cal State Fullerton	L 53–66	1–7	Titan Gym (1,028); Fullerton, CA
12/20/2012; 8:35 pm	at Portland State	L 49–63	1–8 (0–1)	Stott Center (659); Portland, OR
12/22/2012; 3:05 pm	at Eastern Washington	L 54–57	1–9 (0–2)	Reese Court (610); Cheney, WA
12/29/2012*; 4:00 pm, Pac-12	at Washington State	L 39–74	1–10	Beasley Coliseum (4,590); Pullman, WA
01/03/2013; 7:05 pm	North Dakota	L 53–66	1–11 (0–3)	Holt Arena (1,906); Pocatello, ID
01/05/2013; 7:05 pm	Northern Colorado	W 86–63	2–11 (1–3)	Holt Arena (1,522); Pocatello, ID
01/12/2013; 7:05 pm	at Southern Utah	W 54–53	3–11 (2–3)	Centrum Arena (2,994); Cedar City, UT
01/14/2013; 7:05 pm	Weber State	L 54–70	3–12 (2–4)	Reed Gym (2,093); Pocatello, ID
01/17/2013; 7:05 pm	Sacramento State	W 60–59	4–12 (3–4)	Reed Gym (1,726); Pocatello, ID
01/19/2013; 7:05 pm	Northern Arizona	L 55–60	4–13 (3–5)	Reed Gym (2,186); Pocatello, ID
01/24/2013; 7:00 pm	at Montana	L 51–70	4–14 (3–6)	Dahlberg Arena (3,252); Missoula, MT
01/26/2013; 7:05 pm	at Montana State	L 59–61 ^{OT}	4–15 (3–7)	Worthington Arena (3,340); Bozeman, MT
01/31/2013; 7:05 pm	at Northern Colorado	L 63–78	4–16 (3–8)	Butler–Hancock Sports Pavilion (1,784); Greeley, CO
02/02/2013; 1:05 pm	at North Dakota	L 52–69	4–17 (3–9)	Betty Engelstad Sioux Center (1,959); Grand Forks, ND
02/07/2013; 7:05 pm	Southern Utah	L 79–81 ^{OT}	4–18 (3–10)	Reed Gym (1,992); Pocatello, ID
02/11/2013; 7:05 pm, ALT	at Weber State	L 40–56	4–19 (3–11)	Dee Events Center (8,758); Ogden, UT
02/14/2013; 7:05 pm	Montana State	W 87–51	5–19 (4–11)	Reed Gym (1,660); Pocatello, ID
02/16/2013; 7:05 pm	Montana	L 54–61	5–20 (4–12)	Reed Gym (1,922); Pocatello, ID
02/23/2013*; 2:00 pm	Idaho; BracketBusters	L 69–75	5–21	Reed Gym (1,795); Pocatello, ID
02/28/2013; 6:35 pm	at Northern Arizona	L 58–67	5–22 (4–13)	Walkup Skydome (923); Flagstaff, AZ
03/02/2013; 8:05 pm	at Sacramento State	L 52–53	5–23 (4–14)	Colberg Court (897); Sacramento, CA
03/07/2013; 7:05 pm	Eastern Washington	L 73–87	5–24 (4–15)	Reed Gym (1,873); Pocatello, ID
03/09/2013; 7:05 pm	Portland State	W 72–71	6–24 (5–15)	Reed Gym (2,018); Pocatello, ID
*Non-conference game. ^{#}Rankings from AP Poll. (#) Tournament seedings in parentheses. All times are in Mountain Time.
