= 2012–13 BYU Cougars men's basketball team =

American college basketball season

2012–13 BYU Cougars men's basketball

NIT 3-seed, Semifinals
- Conference: West Coast Conference
- Record: 24–12 (10–6 WCC)
- Head coach: Dave Rose (8th season)
- Assistant coaches: Terry Nashif; Tim LaComb; Mark Pope
- Home arena: Marriott Center

2012–13 West Coast Conference men's basketball standings
	Conf.				Overall
Team	W		L	PCT	W		L	PCT
No. 1 Gonzaga†	16	–	0	1.000	32	–	3	.914
Saint Mary's	14	–	2	.875	28	–	7	.800
BYU	10	–	6	.625	24	–	12	.667
Santa Clara	9	–	7	.563	26	–	12	.684
San Francisco	7	–	9	.438	15	–	16	.484
San Diego	7	–	9	.438	16	–	18	.471
Pepperdine	4	–	12	.250	12	–	18	.400
Portland	4	–	12	.250	11	–	21	.344
Loyola Marymount	1	–	15	.063	11	–	23	.324
† Conference tournament winner Rankings from AP poll

The 2012–13 BYU Cougars men's basketball team represented Brigham Young University during the 2012–13 NCAA Division I men's basketball season. It was head coach Dave Rose's eighth season at BYU and the Cougars second season in the West Coast Conference. The Cougars played their home games at the Marriott Center. The Cougars finished the regular season at 21–11, good for third place in the WCC. The Cougars accepted an invitation to the NIT, where they lost in the semifinals to eventual champion Baylor. The Cougars finished with an overall record of 24–12, one win away from what would have been a seventh consecutive 25-win season.

== Before the season ==
=== Departures ===
Name	Number	Pos.	Height	Weight	Year	Hometown	Notes
Austin Nelson	3	G	6'0"	160	Freshman	Henderson, Nevada	LDS mission (returning in 2014-15)
Jaren Sweeney	15	G/F	6'5"	190	Freshman	Mesa, Arizona	LDS mission (returning in 2014-15)
Damarcus Harrison	24	G	6'5"	190	Freshman	Provo, Utah	Original plan to serve LDS mission; Transferred to Clemson
Michael Boswell	35	F	6'9"	215	RS Freshman	Aloha, Oregon	
Noah Hartsock	34	F	6'8"	230	Senior	Bartlesville, Oklahoma	Graduated- Signed contract in Euroleague Basketball with Belgium's Generali Okapi Aalstar
Charles Abouo	1	G/F	6'5"	215	Senior	Abidjan, Côte d'Ivoire	Graduated
Nick Martineau	14	G	6'0"	170	Junior	Fruit Heights, Utah	Graduated Early
Chris Collinsworth	41	F	6'10"	215	RS Sophomore	Provo, Utah	Retired after 3rd surgery in 3 seasons
Stephen Rogers	21	F	6'8"	195	Junior	Mesa, Arizona	Retired Due to Continual Knee Problems

=== Recruiting ===
Through the course of the fall and spring letter of intent days, the Cougars would bolster their lineup. On November 11, Coach Rose announced that Cory Calvert and Jordan Chatman had signed letters of intent to play for BYU. He revealed then that both Calvert and Chatman planned to serve church missions before joining the team, meaning they wouldn't become part of the BYU team until the 2014–15 season. Freshman Cooper Ainge, son of former BYU great Danny Ainge, announced he would walk-on at BYU. He plans to play for 1 year before departing on a mission. The spring national Letter of Intent Signing Days began on April 10, 2012 and ran through May 16. On the first day of eligibility, Raúl Delgado and Agustín Ambrosino signed letters of intent. Both will come in as juniors and have two years of eligibility. On April 20, it was announced that Cory Calvert would play one season before going on his mission, just as Ainge is doing, because he wouldn't have time to get into playing shape for the 2014–15 season after his mission.

College recruiting (2012)
Name	Hometown	School	Height	Weight	Commit date
Cooper Ainge; PG	Wellesley, Massachusetts	Wellesley	6 ft 0 in (1.83 m)	175 lb (79 kg)	Oct 3, 2011
Cooper Ainge; PG	Recruit ratings: (40)				
Cory Calvert; SG	Parker, Colorado	Chaparral	6 ft 3 in (1.91 m)	185 lb (84 kg)	Sep 10, 2011
Cory Calvert; SG	Recruit ratings: Scout: (40)				
Jordan Chatman; PG	Vancouver, Washington	Union	6 ft 4 in (1.93 m)	190 lb (86 kg)	Sep 6, 2011
Jordan Chatman; PG	Recruit ratings: (83)				
Raúl Delgado; PG or SG	Chihuahua, Chihuahua	Western Nebraska CC	6 ft 2 in (1.88 m)	195 lb (88 kg)	Jan 30, 2012
Raúl Delgado; PG or SG	Recruit ratings: (JC)				
Agustín Ambrosino; PF	Cordoba, Argentina	Gulf Coast CC; Salt Lake CC	6 ft 2 in (1.88 m)	195 lb (88 kg)	Apr 8, 2012
Agustín Ambrosino; PF	Recruit ratings: (JC)				
Overall recruit ranking: Scout: nr Rivals: nr ESPN: nr
Note: In many cases, Scout, Rivals, 247Sports, On3, and ESPN may conflict in their listings of height and weight.; In these cases, the average was taken. ESPN grades are on a 100-point scale.; Sources: "ESPN". ESPN.; "2012 Team Ranking". Rivals.

=== 2012–13 Return Missionaries ===
BYU would also get a boost from 2 return missionaries in the form of Tyler Haws and Kyle Rose. Haws would return to BYU on April 18, 2012 to get ready to play. In Haws first season at BYU (2009–10), Haws would average 11.3 points and 4.2 rebounds a game while helping BYU to a 30–6 record. Rose is the nephew of head coach Dave Rose and will be playing his first regular season for BYU after redshirting the 2009-10 season.

College recruiting (2012)
Name	Hometown	School	Height	Weight	Commit date
Tyler Haws; PG or SG	Highland, Utah	Lone Peak	6 ft 5 in (1.96 m)	200 lb (91 kg)	Sep 24, 2008
Tyler Haws; PG or SG	Recruit ratings: Scout: Rivals: (80)				
Kyle Rose; G	Beaverton, Oregon	Southridge	6 ft 0 in (1.83 m)	180 lb (82 kg)	
Kyle Rose; G	Recruit ratings: No ratings found				
Overall recruit ranking: Scout: nr Rivals: nr ESPN: nr
Note: In many cases, Scout, Rivals, 247Sports, On3, and ESPN may conflict in their listings of height and weight.; In these cases, the average was taken. ESPN grades are on a 100-point scale.; Sources: "ESPN". ESPN.; "2012 Team Ranking". Rivals.

== 2012–13 media ==
=== Television information ===
On the April 30 episode of True Blue, it was announced that fall practice would begin October 12. The Blue-White Scrimmage took place on October 24, and the Cougars had their first scrimmage on October 26. BYUtvsports.com and BYUtv provided coverage of the inter-squad match and the scrimmages. All home games and conference road games aired on BYUtv or on ESPN, ESPN2, ESPNU, or ROOT.

=== Media Day ===
BYU Basketball Media Day was held Wednesday, August 10 from 8:30 AM– 2:30 PM. Jarom Jordan recapped the 2011-12 season and then interviewed every player on the 2012-13 BYU Basketball roster. The day ended with a Dave Rose press conference and then player interviews with various media organizations.

It was also announced on Media Day that BYUtv Sports would carry all home broadcasts that ESPN had not picked up while BYUtvsports.com would exclusively carry the 2012 Cougar Classic.

=== BYU Radio Sports Network Affiliates ===
KSL 102.7 FM and 1160 AM- Flagship Station (Salt Lake City/ Provo, UT and ksl.com)
BYU Radio- Nationwide (Dish Network 980, Sirius XM 143, and byuradio.org)
KTHK- Blackfoot/ Idaho Falls/ Pocatello/ Rexburg, ID
KMGR- Manti, UT
KSUB- Cedar City, UT
KDXU- St. George, UT

== Roster ==
2012–13 BYU Cougars men's basketball team
Players
Coaches

Pos.	#	Name	Height	Weight	Year	Previous school	Hometown
F	0	Brandon Davies (C)	6 ft 9 in (2.06 m)	235 lb (107 kg)	Sr	Provo	Provo, UT
G	1	Raúl Delgado	6 ft 2 in (1.88 m)	195 lb (88 kg)	Jr	Western Nebraska CC	Chihuahua, Mexico
G	2	Craig Cusick	6 ft 2 in (1.88 m)	185 lb (84 kg)	RS Sr	Orem; Utah	Orem, UT
G	3	Tyler Haws (C)	6 ft 5 in (1.96 m)	200 lb (91 kg)	So	Lone Peak	Alpine, UT
F	5	Agustín Ambrosino	6 ft 2 in (1.88 m)	195 lb (88 kg)	Jr	Gulf Coast CC; Salt Lake CC	Córdoba, Argentina
F	12	Josh Sharp (injured)	6 ft 7 in (2.01 m)	185 lb (84 kg)	RS So	Lone Peak; Utah	Highland, UT
G/F	13	Brock Zylstra (C)	6 ft 6 in (1.98 m)	210 lb (95 kg)	Sr	Bonita	La Verne, CA
G	20	Anson Winder	6 ft 3 in (1.91 m)	195 lb (88 kg)	RS So	Bishop Gorman	Las Vegas, NV
G	23	Cory Calvert	6 ft 3 in (1.91 m)	185 lb (84 kg)	Fr	Chaparral	Parker, CO
G	30	Cooper Ainge (redshirt)	6 ft 0 in (1.83 m)	175 lb (79 kg)	Fr	Wellesley	Wellesley, MA
F/C	33	Nate Austin	6 ft 11 in (2.11 m)	230 lb (104 kg)	RS So	Lone Peak	Alpine, UT
F/C	42	Ian Harward	6 ft 10 in (2.08 m)	215 lb (98 kg)	RS Fr	Orem	Orem, UT
F	44	Bronson Kaufusi	6 ft 7 in (2.01 m)	260 lb (118 kg)	Fr	Timpview	Provo, UT
G	53	Matt Carlino	6 ft 2 in (1.88 m)	175 lb (79 kg)	RS So	Bloomington South (Bloomington, IN)	Scottsdale, AZ

Head coach

- Dave Rose (Houston)

Assistant coach(es)

- Terry Nashif (BYU)
- Tim LaComb (Utah)
- Mark Pope (Kentucky)

Legend

- (C) Team captain
- (S) Suspended
- (I) Ineligible
- (W) Walk-on
- Injured
- Current redshirt

== Schedule ==
Date time, TV	Rank^{#}	Opponent^{#}	Result	Record	Site city, state
Exhibition
10/26/2012*; 7:00 pm, BYUtv		Southeastern Oklahoma	W 103–57	-	Marriott Center; Provo, UT
11/03/2012*; 7:00 pm, BYUtv		Findlay	W 90–61	-	Marriott Center; Provo, UT
Regular Season
11/9/2012*; 7:00 pm, BYUtv		Tennessee State; Coaches Vs. Cancer Classic	W 81–66	1–0	Marriott Center; Provo, UT
11/13/2012*; 7:00 pm, BYUtv		Georgia State; Coaches Vs. Cancer Classic	W 80–62	2–0	Marriott Center; Provo, UT
11/16/2012*; 5:00 pm, truTV		vs. Florida State; Coaches Vs. Cancer Classic Semifinals	L 70–88	2–1	Barclays Center; Brooklyn, NY
11/17/2012*; 5:00 pm, truTV		vs. No. 20/21 Notre Dame; Coaches Vs. Cancer Classic 3rd Place Game	L 68–78	2–2	Barclays Center; Brooklyn, NY
11/21/2012*; 7:00 pm, BYUtv		UTSA	W 81–62	3–2	Marriott Center; Provo, UT
11/24/2012*; 7:00 pm, BYUtv		Cal State Northridge	W 87–75	4–2	Marriott Center; Provo, UT
11/28/2012*; 7:00 pm, BYUtv		vs. Montana	W 85–60	5–2	EnergySolutions Arena; Salt Lake City, UT
12/01/2012*; 12:00 pm, Cyclones.TV		at Iowa State	L 62–83	5–3	Hilton Coliseum; Ames, IA
12/08/2012*; 7:00 pm, BYUtv		Utah; Old Oquirrh Bucket and Deseret First Duel	W 61–58	6–3	Marriott Center; Provo, UT
12/15/2012*; 7:00 pm, BYUtv		at Weber State; Old Oquirrh Bucket	W 78–68	7–3	Dee Events Center; Ogden, UT
12/18/2012*; 7:00 pm, BYUtv		Eastern New Mexico	W 95–62	8–3	Marriott Center; Provo, UT
12/21/2012*; 7:00 pm, ESPN2		at Baylor	L 64–79	8–4	Ferrell Center; Waco, TX
12/27/2012*; 7:00 pm, BYUtv		Northern Arizona	W 84–54	9–4	Marriott Center; Provo, UT
12/29/2012*; 12:00 pm, ESPNU		vs. Virginia Tech	W 91–74	10–4	EnergySolutions Arena; Salt Lake City, UT
01/03/2013; 7:00 pm, BYUtv		Loyola Marymount	W 92–51	11–4 (1–0)	Marriott Center; Provo, UT
01/05/2013; 8:00 pm, BYUtv		at San Francisco	W 80–76	12–4 (2–0)	War Memorial Gymnasium; San Francisco, CA
01/10/2013; 7:00 pm, BYUtv		Pepperdine	W 76–51	13–4 (3–0)	Marriott Center; Provo, UT
01/12/2013; 2:30 pm, WCC TV		at Santa Clara	W 82–64	14–4 (4–0)	Leavey Center; Santa Clara, CA
01/16/2013; 9:00 pm, ESPNU		Saint Mary's	L 69–70	14–5 (4–1)	Marriott Center; Provo, UT
01/19/2013; 7:00 pm, BYUtv		San Diego	W 74–57	15–5 (5–1)	Marriott Center; Provo, UT
01/24/2013; 9:00 pm, ESPN2		at No. 10/10 Gonzaga	L 63–83	15–6 (5–2)	McCarthey Athletic Center; Spokane, WA
01/26/2013; 8:30 pm, ESPNU		at Portland	W 85–67	16–6 (6–2)	Chiles Center; Portland, OR
01/31/2013; 8:00 pm, ROOT		at Pepperdine	W 63–61	17–6 (7–2)	Firestone Fieldhouse; Malibu, CA
02/02/2013; 7:00 pm, BYUtv		Santa Clara	W 96–79	18–6 (8–2)	Marriott Center; Provo, UT
02/07/2013; 8:00 pm, BYUtv		at San Diego	L 68–74	18–7 (8–3)	Jenny Craig Pavilion; San Diego, CA
02/09/2013; 7:00 pm, BYUtv		San Francisco	L 87–99	18–8 (8–4)	Marriott Center; Provo, UT
02/16/2013; 7:00 pm, BYUtv		Portland	W 86–72	19–8 (9–4)	Marriott Center; Provo, UT
02/19/2013*; 7:00 pm, BYUtv		Utah State; Old Oquirrh Bucket	W 70–68	20–8	Marriott Center; Provo, UT
02/21/2013; 9:00 pm, ESPN2		at Saint Mary's	L 57–64	20–9 (9–5)	McKeon Pavilion; Moraga, CA
02/28/2013; 9:00 pm, ESPN2		No. 2/2 Gonzaga	L 65–70	20–10 (9–6)	Marriott Center; Provo, UT
03/02/2013; 9:00 pm, ESPNU		at Loyola Marymount	W 73–70	21–10 (10–6)	Gersten Pavilion; Los Angeles, CA
2013 West Coast Conference men's basketball tournament
03/08/2013; 9:30 pm, ESPNU		vs. San Diego; Quarterfinals	L 69–72	21–11	Orleans Arena; Las Vegas, NV
2013 National Invitation Tournament
03/19/2013*; 7:30 pm, ESPN	No. (3)	(6) Washington; First Round	W 90–79	22–11	Marriott Center; Provo, UT
03/25/2013*; 7:00 pm, ESPNews	No. (3)	(7) Mercer; Second Round	W 90–71	23–11	Marriott Center; Provo, UT
03/27/2013*; 6:00 pm, ESPNU	No. (3)	at (1) Southern Miss; Quarterfinals	W 79–62	24–11	Reed Green Coliseum; Hattiesburg, MS
04/02/2013*; 5:00 pm, ESPN2	No. (3)	vs. (2) Baylor; Semifinals	L 70–76	24–12	Madison Square Garden; New York, NY
*Non-conference game. ^{#}Rankings from AP Poll / Coaches' Poll. (#) Tournament seedings in parentheses. All times are in Mountain. (#) during NIT is Seed within Region.

== Game summaries ==
=== Cougar Tipoff ===
Broadcasters: Robbie Bullough, Steve Cleveland, and Shaun Gordon

byutvsports.com

Oct 24
7:05 pm MST

Recap

BYU Blue 84, BYU White 70
Scoring by half: 47-42, 37-28
Pts: Tyler Haws 26; Rebs: Nate Austin 10; Asts: Matt Carlino 8	Pts: Brandon Davies 20; Rebs: Brandon Davies 7 Asts: Cory Calvert 5

Marriott Center
Provo, UT
Attendance: N/A
Referees: N/A

=== Exhibition: Southeastern Oklahoma State ===
Broadcasters: Dave McCann, Blaine Fowler, and Kory Aldous

BYUtv

Oct 26
7:05 pm MST

Recap

Southeastern Oklahoma State Savage Storm 57, BYU Cougars 103
Scoring by half: 25-50, 32-53
Pts: Urald King 14; Rebs: Antonio Worthy 10; Asts: Chris Roussell 3	Pts: Brandon Davies 25; Rebs: Agustin Ambrosino 8 Asts: Matt Carlino 8

Marriott Center
Provo, UT
Attendance: 11,901
Referees: Kevin Brill, Glen Mayberry, Deldre Carr

=== Exhibition: Findlay ===
Broadcasters: Dave McCann, Steve Cleveland, and Robbie Bullough

BYUtv

Nov 3
7:05 pm MST

Recap

#3 (D2) Findlay Oilers 61, BYU Cougars 90
Scoring by half: 24-40, 37-50
Pts: Greg Khalig 11; Rebs: Jack Smith 5 Asts: Jake Heagen 3	Pts: Tyler Haws 19; Rebs: Brandon Davies 13; Asts: Matt Carlino 6 Davies with a double-double

Marriott Center
Provo, UT
Attendance: 13,085
Referees: Richard Cartmell, Casey McClellan, Rob Rorke

=== Coaches vs. Cancer Classic: Tennessee State ===
Series History: First Meeting
Broadcasters: Dave McCann, Steve Cleveland, and Robbie Bullough

BYUtv

Nov 9
7:05 pm MST

Recap

Tennessee State Tigers 66, BYU Cougars 81
Scoring by half: 28-34, 38-47
Pts: Kellen Thornton 20; Rebs: Kellen Thornton 8 Asts: Patrick Miller 9	Pts: Tyler Haws 22; Rebs: Brandon Davies 7 Asts: Matt Carlino 10

Marriott Center
Provo, UT
Attendance: 16,283
Referees: James Giron, Marc Beasley, Jeffrey Kent

=== Coaches vs. Cancer Classic: Georgia State ===
Series History: First Meeting
Broadcasters: Dave McCann, Blaine Fowler, and Robbie Bullough

BYUtv

Nov 13
7:05 pm MST

Recap

Georgia State Panthers 62, BYU Cougars 80
Scoring by half: 26-44, 36-36
Pts: Manny Atkins 21; Rebs: Manny Atkins 8 Asts: Devonta White 3	Pts: Brandon Davies 28; Rebs: Brandon Davies 9 Asts: Matt Carlino 7

Marriott Center
Provo, UT
Attendance: 13,181
Referees: Michael Reed, Gregory Nixon, Mark Cook

=== Coaches vs. Cancer Classic: Florida State ===
Series History: BYU leads series 1-0
Broadcasters: Brian Anderson, Greg Anthony, Steve Smith, Craig Sager, and Seth Davis

truTV

Nov 16
7:00 pm EST

Recap

Florida State Seminoles 88, BYU Cougars 70
Scoring by half: 44-35, 44-35
Pts: Okaro White 17; Rebs: Michael Snaer 7 Asts: Devon Bookert 6	Pts: Brandon Davies & Tyler Haws 19; Rebs: Tyler Haws 7 Asts: Tyler Haws 5

Barclays Center
Brooklyn, NY
Attendance: N/A
Referees: Karl Hess, Les Jones, Ray Natili

=== Coaches vs. Cancer Classic: #20 Notre Dame ===
Series History: Notre Dame leads series 4-3
Broadcasters: Brian Anderson, Greg Anthony, Steve Smith, Craig Sager, and Seth Davis

truTV

Nov 17
7:00 pm EST

Recap

#20 Notre Dame Fighting Irish 78, BYU Cougars 68
Scoring by half: 31-32, 47-36
Pts: Jack Cooley & Jarian Grant 19; Rebs: Jack Cooley 12; Asts: Pat Connaughton 4	Pts: Tyler Haws 21; Rebs: Josh Sharp 8 Asts: Brock Zylstra 4

Barclays Center
Brooklyn, NY
Attendance: N/A
Referees: Brian Dorsey, Tim Kelly, Jerry Heater

=== Texas-San Antonio ===
Series History: First Meeting
Broadcasters: Dave McCann, Blaine Fowler, and Robbie Bullough

BYUtv

Nov 21
7:05 pm MST

Recap

UTSA Roadrunners 62, BYU Cougars 81
Scoring by half: 28-48, 34-33
Pts: Kannon Burrage 22; Rebs: Jeromie Hill 6 Asts: Michael Hale III 4	Pts: Brandon Davies 22; Rebs: Brandon Davies 10; Asts: Craig Cusick 5

Marriott Center
Provo, UT
Attendance: 16,475
Referees: Donald McAllister, Justin Van Duyne, Tom Nally

=== Cal State Northridge ===
Series History: BYU leads series 4-0
Broadcasters: Dave McCann, Blaine Fowler, and Robbie Bullough

BYUtv

Nov 24
7:05 pm MST

Recap

CS Northridge Matadors 75, BYU Cougars 87
Scoring by half: 40-46, 35-41
Pts: Stephan Hicks 25; Rebs: Stephan Hicks 8 Asts: Tre Hale-Edmerson 5	Pts: Tyler Haws 32; Rebs: Brandon Davies 8 Asts: Matt Carlino 6

Marriott Center
Provo, UT
Attendance: 20,900
Referees: Michael Greenstein, Kurt Walker, Milton Stowe

=== Montana ===
Series History: BYU leads series 23-10
Broadcasters: Dave McCann, Blaine Fowler, and Robbie Bullough

BYUtv

Nov 28
7:05 pm MST

Recap

Montana Grizzlies 60, BYU Cougars 85
Scoring by half: 31-42, 29-43
Pts: Kareem Jamar 17; Rebs: Kareem Jamar 9 Asts: Jordan Gregory 3	Pts: Brandon Davies 21; Rebs: Brandon Davies 10; Asts: Brandon Davies 6

EnergySolutions Arena
Salt Lake City, UT
Attendance: 12,378
Referees: Michael Irving, Brett Nansel, Courtney Holmes

=== At Iowa State ===
Series History: Iowa State leads series 4-0
Broadcasters: John Walters and Eric Heft

Cyclones.TV

Dec 1
1:00 pm CST

Recap

BYU Cougars 62, Iowa State Cyclones 83
Scoring by half: 37-48, 25-35
Pts: Brandon Davies 20; Rebs: Brandon Davies 6 Asts: Brandon Davies, Tyler Haws, Craig Cusick, & Matt Carlino 3	Pts: Will Clyburn 32; Rebs: Melvin Ejim 8 Asts: Korie Lucious 9

Hilton Coliseum
Ames, IA
Attendance: 13,739
Referees: Duke Edsall, Rick Crawford, Jeb Hartness

=== Utah ===
Series History: BYU leads series 128-125
Broadcasters: Dave McCann, Steve Cleveland, and Robbie Bullough

BYUtv

Dec 8
7:05 pm MST

Recap

Utah Utes 58, BYU Cougars 61
Scoring by half: 35-26, 23-35
Pts: Jordan Loveridge 14; Rebs: Dallin Bachynski 9 Asts: Glen Dean 3	Pts: Matt Carlino 19; Rebs: Josh Sharp 9 Asts: Matt Carlino 5

Marriott Center
Provo, UT
Attendance: 16,109
Referees: Mike Scyphers, Randy McCall, Ken Ditty

=== At Weber State ===
Series History: BYU leads series 27-10
Broadcasters: Dave McCann, Blaine Fowler, and Robbie Bullough (Jarom Jordan and Steve Cleveland Halftime)

BYUtv

Dec 15
7:00 pm MST

Recap

BYU Cougars 78, Weber State Wildcats 68
Scoring by half: 36-26, 42-42
Pts: Brandon Davies 33; Rebs: Brandon Davies 8 Asts: Tyler Haws 3 Career High Points for Davies & Cory Calvert	Pts: Davion Berry 25; Rebs: Frank Otis & Joel Bolomboy 7 Asts: Scott Bamforth & Gel Wheelwright 3 Career High Points for Davion Berry

Dee Events Center
Ogden, UT
Attendance: 8,695
Referees: Horace Shields, Klaus Endrissat, Deldre Carr

=== Eastern New Mexico ===
Series History: BYU leads series 1-0
Broadcasters: Dave McCann, Steve Cleveland, and Robbie Bullough

BYUtv

Dec 18
7:05 pm MST

Recap

Eastern New Mexico Greyhounds 62, BYU Cougars 95
Scoring by half: 29-33, 44-51
Pts: Rodney Blackmon 14; Rebs: Jordan Romero & Lawrence Domingo 5 Asts: Rodney Blackmon 6	Pts: Tyler Haws 19; Rebs: Agustin Ambrosino 8 Asts: Craig Cusick 6

Marriott Center
Provo, UT
Attendance: 15,820
Referees: Richard Batsell, Michael Eggers, Tom Spitznagel

=== At Baylor ===
Series History: BYU leads series 5-3
Broadcasters: Mark Neely and Bruce Pearl

ESPN2

Dec 21
7:00 pm MST

Recap

BYU Cougars 64, Baylor Bears 79
Scoring by half: 31-40, 33-39
Pts: Brandon Davies 26; Rebs: Brandon Davies 17; Asts: Brandon Davies & Tyler Haws 3	Pts: Pierre Jackson 16; Rebs: Cory Jefferson 16; Asts: Pierre Jackson 9

Ferrell Center
Waco, TX
Attendance: 7,239
Referees: Jimmy Casas, Daryl Gelinas, Casey McClellan

=== Northern Arizona ===
Series History: Series even 1-1
Broadcasters: Dave McCann, Blaine Fowler, and Robbie Bullough

BYUtv

Dec 27
7:05 pm MST

Recap

Northern Arizona Lumberjacks 54, BYU Cougars 84
Scoring by half: 23-48, 31-36
Pts: Michael Dunn 17; Rebs: Stallon Saldivar 9 Asts: Stallon Saldivar 4	Pts: Brandon Davies 27; Rebs: Brandon Davies 10; Asts: Matt Carlino 6

Marriott Center
Provo, UT
Attendance: 17,342
Referees: Michael Scyphers, Tony Padilla, Mark Cook

=== Virginia Tech ===
Series History: BYU leads series 2-0
Broadcasters: Rich Cellini and Steve Cleveland

ESPNU

Dec 29
12:05 pm MST

Recap

Virginia Tech Hokies 74, BYU Cougars 91
Scoring by half: 31-56, 40-41
Pts: Jarell Eddie 17; Rebs: Christian Beyer 11; Asts: Erick Green 6	Pts: Tyler Haws 42; Rebs: Nate Austin 8 Asts: Brandon Davies & Brock Zylstra 4

EnergySolutions Arena
Salt Lake City, UT
Attendance: 15,684
Referees: Tommy Nunez, Jimmy Casas, Horace Shields

=== Loyola Marymount ===
Series History: Loyola Marymount leads series 3-2
Broadcasters: Dave McCann, Blaine Fowler, and Robbie Bullough

BYUtv

Jan 3
7:05 pm MST

Recap

Loyola Marymount Lions 51, BYU Cougars 92
Scoring by half: 20-35, 31-57
Pts: Ashley Hamilton 16; Rebs: Chase Flint 7 Asts: Ayodeji Egbeyemi 3	Pts: Matt Carlino 21; Rebs: Josh Sharp 12; Asts: Matt Carlino 5

Marriott Center
Provo, UT
Attendance: 18,160
Referees: Kevin Brill, Ken Ditty, Deldre Carr

=== At San Francisco ===
Series History: BYU leads series 7-5
Broadcasters: Dave McCann and Blaine Fowler (Jarom Jordan and Steve Cleveland Halftime)

BYUtv

Jan 5
8:00 pm MST

Recap

BYU Cougars 80, San Francisco Dons 76
Scoring by half: 37-46, 43-30
Pts: Cole Dickerson & Cody Doolin 22; Rebs: Cole Dickerson 9 Asts: Cody Doolin 10	Pts: Tyler Haws & Matt Carlino 22; Rebs: Josh Sharp 10; Asts: Matt Carlino 4

The Hilltop
San Francisco, CA
Attendance: 2,123
Referees: Tony Padilla, Deron White, Horace Shields

=== Pepperdine ===
Series History: BYU leads series 6-4
Broadcasters: Dave McCann, Blaine Fowler, and Robbie Bullough

BYUtv

Jan 10
7:05 pm MST

Recap

Pepperdine Waves 51, BYU Cougars 76
Scoring by half: 35-30, 16-46
Pts: Jordan Baker 20; Rebs: Stacy Davis 8 Asts: Jordan Baker 3	Pts: Tyler Haws 24; Rebs: Brandon Davies 9 Asts: Brock Zylstra 6

Marriott Center
Provo, UT
Attendance: 14,888
Referees: Michael Eggers, Brett Nansel, Jimmy Casas

=== At Santa Clara ===
Series History: BYU leads series 17-5
Broadcasters: Barry Tompkins and Brad Holland

WCC TV via ROOT

Jan 12
2:30 pm MST

Recap

BYU Cougars 82, Santa Clara Broncos 64
Scoring by half: 41-32, 41-32
Pts: Tyler Haws 24; Rebs: Brandon Davies 8 Asts: Matt Carlino 8	Pts: Kevin Foster 22; Rebs: Marc Trasolini 14; Asts: Evan Roquemore 8

Leavey Center
Santa Clara, CA
Attendance: 2,853
Referees: Frank Harvey, Glen Mayberry, Jeff Ketchu

=== Saint Mary's ===
Series History: BYU leads series 8-4
Broadcasters: Rich Cellini and Miles Simon

ESPNU

Jan 16
9:05 pm MST

Recap

Saint Mary's Gaels 70, BYU Cougars 69
Scoring by half: 27-34, 43-35
Pts: Stephen Holt 22; Rebs: Brad Waldow, Mitchell Young, & James Walker III 7 Asts: Matthew Dellavedova 8	Pts: Tyler Haws 23; Rebs: Tyler Haws 7 Asts: Matt Carlino 5

Marriott Center
Provo, UT
Attendance: 14,857
Referees: Michael Irving, Richard Cartmell, Michael Scyphers

=== San Diego ===
Series History: BYU leads series 5-0
Broadcasters: Dave McCann, Steve Cleveland, and Robbie Bullough

BYUtv

Jan 19
7:05 pm MST

Recap

San Diego Toreros 57, BYU Cougars 74
Scoring by half: 31-43, 26-31
Pts: Johnny Dee 15; Rebs: Chris Manresa 6 Asts: Chris Anderson 7	Pts: Tyler Haws 25; Rebs: Nate Austin 9 Asts: Matt Carlino 6 Coach Dave Rose's 200th win

Marriott Center
Provo, UT
Attendance: 17,281
Referees: Dennis Flannery Jr., Sam Haddad, Klaus Endrissat

=== At #10 Gonzaga ===
Series History: Gonzaga leads series 3-2
Broadcasters: Dave Flemming and Stephen Bardo

ESPN2

Jan 24
9:00 pm MST

Recap

BYU Cougars 63, #10 Gonzaga Bulldogs 83
Scoring by half: 21-40, 42-43
Pts: Brandon Davies & Josh Sharp 14; Rebs: Brandon Davies 6 Asts: Matt Carlino 4	Pts: Kelly Olynyk 26; Rebs: Elias Harris 10; Asts: Kelly Olynyk 5

The Kennel
Spokane, WA
Attendance: 6,000
Referees: Michael Reed, Michael Scyphers, Jimmy Casas

=== At Portland ===
Series History: BYU leads series 7-0
Broadcasters: Roxy Bernstein and Steve Cleveland

ESPNU

Jan 26
8:30 pm MST

Recap

BYU Cougars 85, Portland Pilots 67
Scoring by half: 39-29, 46-38
Pts: Matt Carlino 24; Rebs: Brandon Davies 11; Asts: Matt Carlino 6	Pts: Ryan Nicholas 16; Rebs: Ryan Nicholas 11; Asts: Bryce Pressley, Oskars Reinfelds, and Derrick Rodgers 4

Chiles Center
Portland, OR
Attendance: 3,078
Referees: Michael Greenstein, Milton Stowe, Scott Harris

=== At Pepperdine ===
Series History: BYU leads series 7-4
Broadcasters: Ari Wolfe and Jarron Collins

TWC SN via ROOT

Jan 31
8:03 pm MST

Recap

BYU Cougars 63, Pepperdine Waves 61
Scoring by half: 20-31, 43-30
Pts: Tyler Haws 21; Rebs: Brandon Davies 12; Asts: Matt Carlino 4	Pts: Stacy Davis 17; Rebs: Jett Raines 8 Asts: Lorne Jackson 7

Firestone Fieldhouse
Malibu, CA
Attendance: 1,824
Referees: Richard Batsell, Daryl Gelinas, Deldre Carr

=== Santa Clara ===
Series History: BYU leads series 18-5
Broadcasters: Dave McCann, Steve Cleveland, and Robbie Bullough

BYUtv

Feb 2
7:05 pm MST

Recap

Santa Clara Broncos 79, BYU Cougars 96
Scoring by half: 46-47, 33-49
Pts: Kevin Foster 18; Rebs: Yannick Atanga 9 Asts: Kevin Foster 9	Pts: Matt Carlino 28; Rebs: Brandon Davies 11; Asts: Matt Carlino 6

Marriott Center
Provo, UT
Attendance: 17,228
Referees: Tommy Nunez, Brett Nansel, Marc Beasley

=== At San Diego ===
Series History: BYU leads series 6-0
Broadcasters: Dave McCann and Blaine Fowler

BYUtv

Feb 7
8:05 pm MST

Recap

BYU Cougars 68, San Diego Toreros 74
Scoring by half: 36-40, 32-34
Pts: Tyler Haws 27; Rebs: Brandon Davies 10; Asts: Matt Carlino 4	Pts: Johnny Dee 19; Rebs: Chris Manresa & Dennis Kramer 10; Asts: Ken Rancifer 6

The Slim Gym
San Diego, CA
Attendance: 3,296
Referees: Jimmy Casas, Kurt Walker, Ronald Brokenbrough

=== San Francisco ===
Series History: BYU leads series 8-5
Broadcasters: Dave McCann, Steve Cleveland, and Robbie Bullough

BYUtv

Feb 9
7:05 pm MST

Recap

San Francisco Dons 99, BYU Cougars 87
Scoring by half: 39-48, 60-39
Pts: De'End Parker 23; Rebs: Cole Dickerson 11; Asts: Cody Doolin 8	Pts: Brock Zylstra 18; Rebs: Brandon Davies 9 Asts: Tyler Haws 4

Marriott Center
Provo, UT
Attendance: 15,477
Referees: Michael Irving, Ken Ditty, Justin Van Duyne

=== Portland ===
Series History: BYU leads series 8-0
Broadcasters: Dave McCann, Steve Cleveland, and Robbie Bullough

BYUtv

Feb 16
7:05 pm MST

Recap

Portland Pilots 72, BYU Cougars 86
Scoring by half: 25-46, 47-40
Pts: Thomas Van Der Mars 19; Rebs: Thomas Van Der Mars & Jake Ehlers 4 Asts: Bryce Pressley 8	Pts: Tyler Haws 28; Rebs: Tyler Haws 8 Asts: Craig Cusick & Matt Carlino 7

Marriott Center
Provo, UT
Attendance: 17,009
Referees: Richard Cartmell, Richard Batsell, James Giron

=== Utah State ===
Series History: BYU leads series 136-92
Broadcasters: Dave McCann, Blaine Fowler, and Robbie Bullough

This game was originally scheduled for December 5. However, the day before the game, Utah State player Danny Berger collapsed at practice, stopped breathing, and had to be revived. Berger was in critical condition at a hospital in the Salt Lake City suburb of Murray, but quickly improved and was released on December 8. Both schools agreed to postpone and reschedule the game. On the day of Berger's release, the game's new date of February 19 was announced.

BYUtv

Feb 19
7:05 pm MST

Recap

Utah State Aggies 68, BYU Cougars 70
Scoring by half: 32-41, 36-29
Pts: Spencer Butterfield 21; Rebs: Spencer Butterfield 14; Asts: Spencer Butterfield 5	Pts: Tyler Haws 27; Rebs: Craig Cusick 5 Asts: Matt Carlino 5

Marriott Center
Provo, UT
Attendance: 16,569
Referees: Larry Spaulding, Eric Curry, Tom O'Neil

=== At Saint Mary's ===
Series History: BYU leads series 8-5
Broadcasters: Kanoa Leahey and Sean Farnham

ESPN2

Feb 21
9:00 pm MST

Recap

BYU Cougars 57, Saint Mary's Gaels 64
Scoring by half: 32-38, 25-36
Pts: Brandon Davies 25; Rebs: Brandon Davies 9 Asts: Brandon Davies 4	Pts: Matthew Dellavedova 20; Rebs: Beau Levesque 8 Asts: Matthew Dellavedova 4

McKeon Pavilion
Moraga, CA
Attendance: 3,500
Referees: Michael Reed, Gregory Nixon, Tommy Nunez

=== #2 Gonzaga ===
Series History: Gonzaga leads series 4-2
Broadcasters: Dave Flemming and Mark Adams

ESPN2

Feb 28
9:05 pm MST

Recap

#2 Gonzaga Bulldogs 70, BYU Cougars 65
Scoring by half: 35-31, 35-34
Pts: Kelly Olynyk 19; Rebs: Elias Harris 9 Asts: David Stockton & Elias Harris 4	Pts: Tyler Haws 19; Rebs: Brandon Davies 11; Asts: Brandon Davies & Craig Cusick 3

Marriott Center
Provo, UT
Attendance: 19,731
Referees: Michael Greenstein, Michael Irving, Kevin Brill

=== At Loyola Marymount ===
Series History: Series even 3-3
Broadcasters: Roxy Bernstein and Danny Schayes

ESPNU

Mar 2
9:00 pm MST

Recap

BYU Cougars 73, Loyola Marymount Lions 70
Scoring by half: 34-28, 39-42
Pts: Tyler Haws 24; Rebs: Brandon Davies 8 Asts: Matt Carlino 7	Pts: Anthony Ireland 24; Rebs: Godwin Okonji 7 Asts: Anthony Ireland & Chase Flint 5

Gersten Pavilion
Los Angeles, CA
Attendance: 1,911
Referees: Tommy Nunez, Tom Spitznagel, Bruce Hicks

=== WCC Quarterfinals: vs. San Diego ===
Series History: BYU leads series 5-1
Broadcasters: Dave Flemming and Sean Farnham

ESPNU

Mar 8
9:40 pm MST

Recap

San Diego Toreros 72, BYU Cougars 69
Scoring by half: 35-28, 37-41
Pts: Johnny Dee 25; Rebs: Chris Manresa 10; Asts: Chris Anderson 6	Pts: Brandon Davies & Tyler Haws 20; Rebs: Brandon Davies 9 Asts: Brandon Davies 8

Orleans Arena
Paradise, NV
Attendance: 7,896
Referees: Tony Padilla, Richard Batsell, James Giron

=== NIT 1st Round: Washington ===
Series History: Washington leads series 10-8
Broadcasters: Roxy Bernstein and Sean Farnham

ESPN

Mar 19
7:40 pm MDT

Recap

Washington Huskies 79, BYU Cougars 90
Scoring by half: 35-33, 44-57
Pts: CJ Wilcox 20; Rebs: Shawn Kemp Jr. 11; Asts: Abdul Gaddy 9	Pts: Tyler Haws 37 (BYU NIT record for 1 players points); Rebs: Brandon Davies 9 Asts: Matt Carlino 9 Haws, Davies, & Carlino all 20+ points

Marriott Center
Provo, UT
Attendance: 7,511
Referees: Rick Batsell, Jim Giron, Wilson Holland

=== NIT 2nd Round: Mercer ===
Series History: First Meeting
Broadcasters: Dave Pasch and Bill Walton

ESPNews

Mar 25
7:00 pm MDT

Recap

Mercer Bears 71, BYU Cougars 90
Scoring by half: 35-44, 36-46
Pts: Travis Smith 19; Rebs: Bud Thomas and Jacob Gollon 6 Asts: Jacob Gollon 8	Pts: Brandon Davies 26; Rebs: Brandon Davies 10; Asts: Matt Carlino 9

Marriott Center
Provo, UT
Attendance: 12,929
Referees: K. C. Ely, Shawn Lehigh, Daryl Gelinas

=== NIT Quarterfinal: at Southern Miss ===
Series History: First Meeting
Broadcasters: Dave Neal and Joe Dean, Jr.

ESPNU

Mar 27
6:00 pm MDT

Recap

BYU Cougars 79, Southern Miss Golden Eagles 62
Scoring by half: 40-29, 39-33
Pts: Tyler Haws 25; Rebs: Brandon Davies 13; Asts: Matt Carlino 9	Pts: Daveon Bordingham 18; Rebs: Jonathan Mills 15; Asts: Neil Watson 6

Reed Green Coliseum
Hattiesburg, MS
Attendance: 7,679
Referees: Jamie Luckie, Bryan Kersey, Terry Ogelsby

=== NIT Semifinal: Baylor ===
Series History: BYU leads series 5-4
Broadcasters: Bob Wischusen, Dan Dakich, and Bill Raftery (ESPN2); Brad Sham and Steve Lappas (Dial Global)

ESPN2

Apr 2
5:00 pm MDT

Recap

BYU Cougars 70, Baylor Bears 76
Scoring by half: 33-35, 37-41
Pts: Tyler Haws 25; Rebs: Nate Austin 11; Asts: Matt Carlino 5	Pts: Pierre Jackson 24; Rebs: Isaiah Austin 10; Asts: Pierre Jackson 10

Madison Square Garden
New York, NY
Attendance: 10,009
Referees: Brian O'Connell, Tim Clougherty, Earl Walton

== Rankings ==
Regular season polls
Poll	Pre- Season	Week 1	Week 2	Week 3	Week 4	Week 5	Week 6	Week 7	Week 8	Week 9	Week 10	Week 11	Week 12	Week 13	Week 14	Week 15	Week 16	Week 17	Week 18 Postseason	Final
AP	(NV)	(NV)	(NV)	(NV)	(NV)	(NV)	(NV)	(NV)	(NV)	(NV)	(NV)	(NV)	(NV)	(NV)	(NV)	(NV)	(NV)	(NV)	(NV)	
Coaches	(NV)	(NV)	(NV)	(NV)	(NV)	(NV)	(NV)	(NV)	(NV)	(NV)	(NV)	(NV)	(NV)	(NV)	(NV)	(NV)	(NV)	(NV)	(NV)	

Legend
	Increase in ranking
	Decrease in ranking
	No change
(RV)	Received votes
(NV)	No Votes

== Post-season Awards ==
Tyler Haws won the following post-season awards for the 2013-13 season:

- District 9 First Team by the National Association of Basketball Coaches
- First Team All District by the United States Basketball Writers Association
- All-West Coast Conference Team by the league's coaches

Brandon Davies won the following post-season awards for the 2012-13 season:

- District 9 Second Team by the national Association of Basketball Coaches
- First Team All District by the United States Basketball Writers Association
- All-West Coast Conference Team by the league's coaches
