= 2013 Big Sky Conference men's basketball tournament =

- Classification: Division I
- Season: 2012–13
- Teams: 7
- Site: Dahlberg Arena; Missoula, Montana
- Champions: Montana (9th title)
- Winning coach: Wayne Tinkle (2nd title)
- Television: ESPNU (final)

2012–13 Big Sky men's basketball standings
	Conf.				Overall
Team	W		L	PCT	W		L	PCT
Montana †	19	–	1	.950	25	–	7	.781
Weber State	18	–	2	.900	30	–	7	.811
North Dakota	12	–	8	.600	16	–	17	.485
Montana State	10	–	10	.500	13	–	17	.433
Northern Colorado	10	–	10	.500	13	–	18	.419
Sacramento State	8	–	12	.400	14	–	15	.483
Southern Utah	8	–	12	.400	11	–	20	.355
Northern Arizona	8	–	12	.400	11	–	21	.344
Eastern Washington	7	–	13	.350	10	–	21	.323
Portland State	5	–	15	.250	8	–	20	.286
Idaho State	5	–	15	.250	6	–	24	.200
† Conference tournament winner

The 2013 Big Sky Conference men's basketball tournament ran from March 14–16, 2013. The champion of the tournament, Montana, received an automatic bid to the 2013 NCAA tournament.

== Format ==
Unlike most Division I conference tournaments in basketball, the Big Sky tournament did not involve all of the conference's teams. With the addition of North Dakota and Southern Utah to the conference for the 2012–13 season, expanding the number of teams from 9 to 11, the tournament expanded from six teams to seven. As in previous years, qualifying was based on overall conference record. The number of teams that fail to qualify also increased by one, going from three to four. All tournament games were played at the site of the regular-season champion. The men's tournament also returned to a Thursday-Friday-Saturday format. The field was re-seeded after the first round so the #1 seed played the lowest remaining seed, while the highest remaining seeds met in the other semifinal.

== Bracket ==
Quarterfinals, Thursday, March 14
2	Weber State	84
7	Northern Arizona	58
3	North Dakota	69
6	Southern Utah	52
4	Montana State	56
5	Northern Colorado	69

Semifinals (Re-seeded), Friday, March 15
2	Weber State	76
3	North Dakota	74
5	Northern Colorado	56
1	Montana	70

Championship, Saturday, March 16; ESPNU
2	Weber State	64
1	Montana	67

Sacramento State, Eastern Washington, Portland State & Idaho State failed to qualify.
All times listed are Mountain
