= Hornets Nest (Sacramento State) =

Multipurpose gymnasium in California, USA

The Hornets Nest
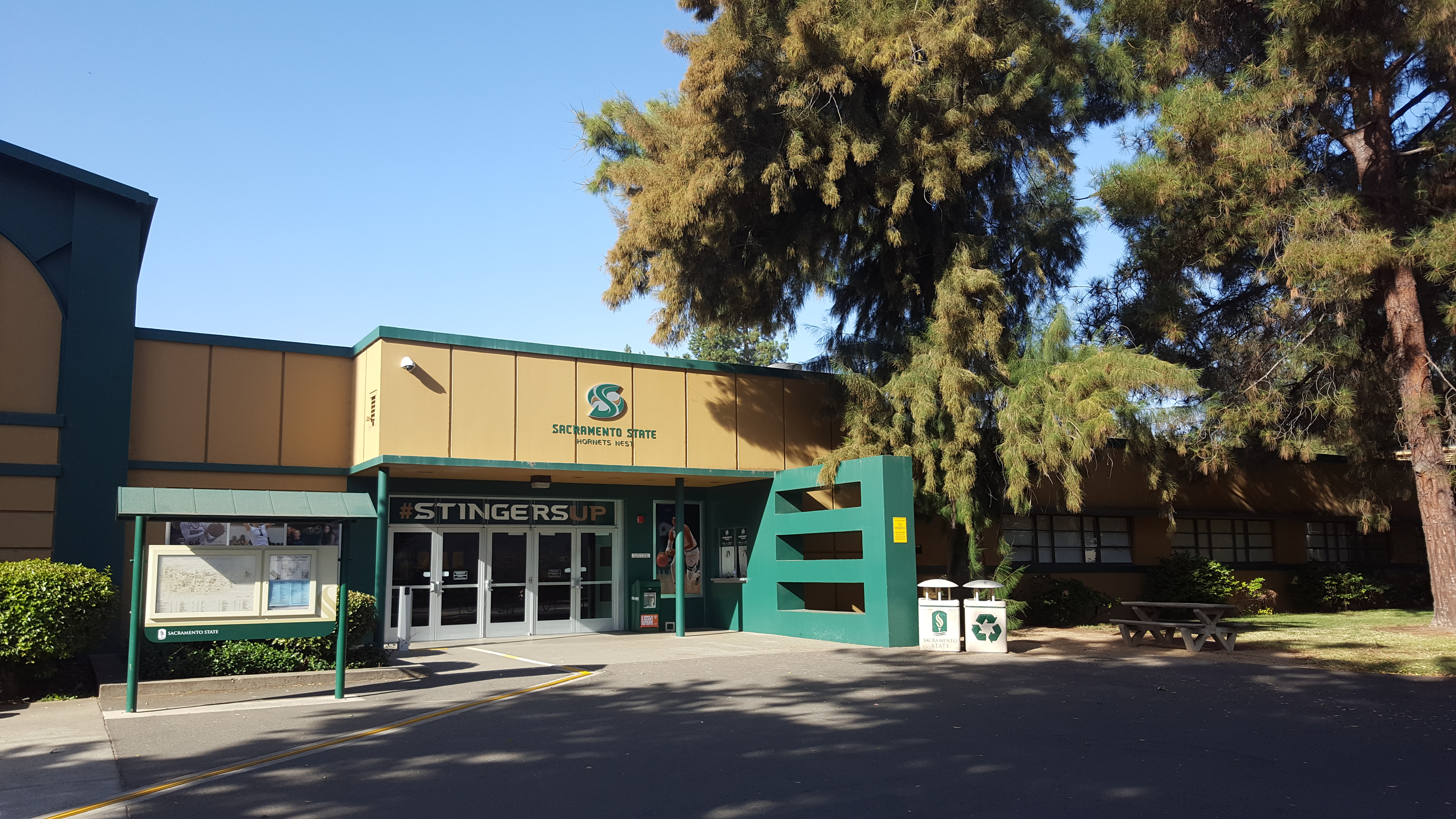
- Interactive map of The Hornets Nest
- Location: Sacramento, California
- Coordinates: 38.561903°N 121.426878°W
- Owner: Sacramento State
- Capacity: 1,012

Construction
- Built: 1955

Tenant
- Sacramento State Hornets (1955–present)

The Hornets Nest is a 1,012-seat multi-purpose gymnasium at California State University, Sacramento (Sacramento State) in Sacramento, California. The arena opened in 1955, and is one of the oldest in D-I sports. It is home to the Sacramento State Hornets men's basketball, women's basketball, women's volleyball and men's wrestling teams.

In 2008, Sacramento State named the floor Colberg Court, in honor of 32-year volleyball head coach Debby Colberg, who retired after the 2007 season. The coach with the most career victories in any sport at Sacramento State, Colberg posted an 828–292 record, garnered two national titles and posted winning volleyball seasons in 30 of her 32 years as head coach.

== See also ==
- List of NCAA Division I basketball arenas
