= Betty Engelstad Sioux Center =

Arena in Grand Forks, North Dakota

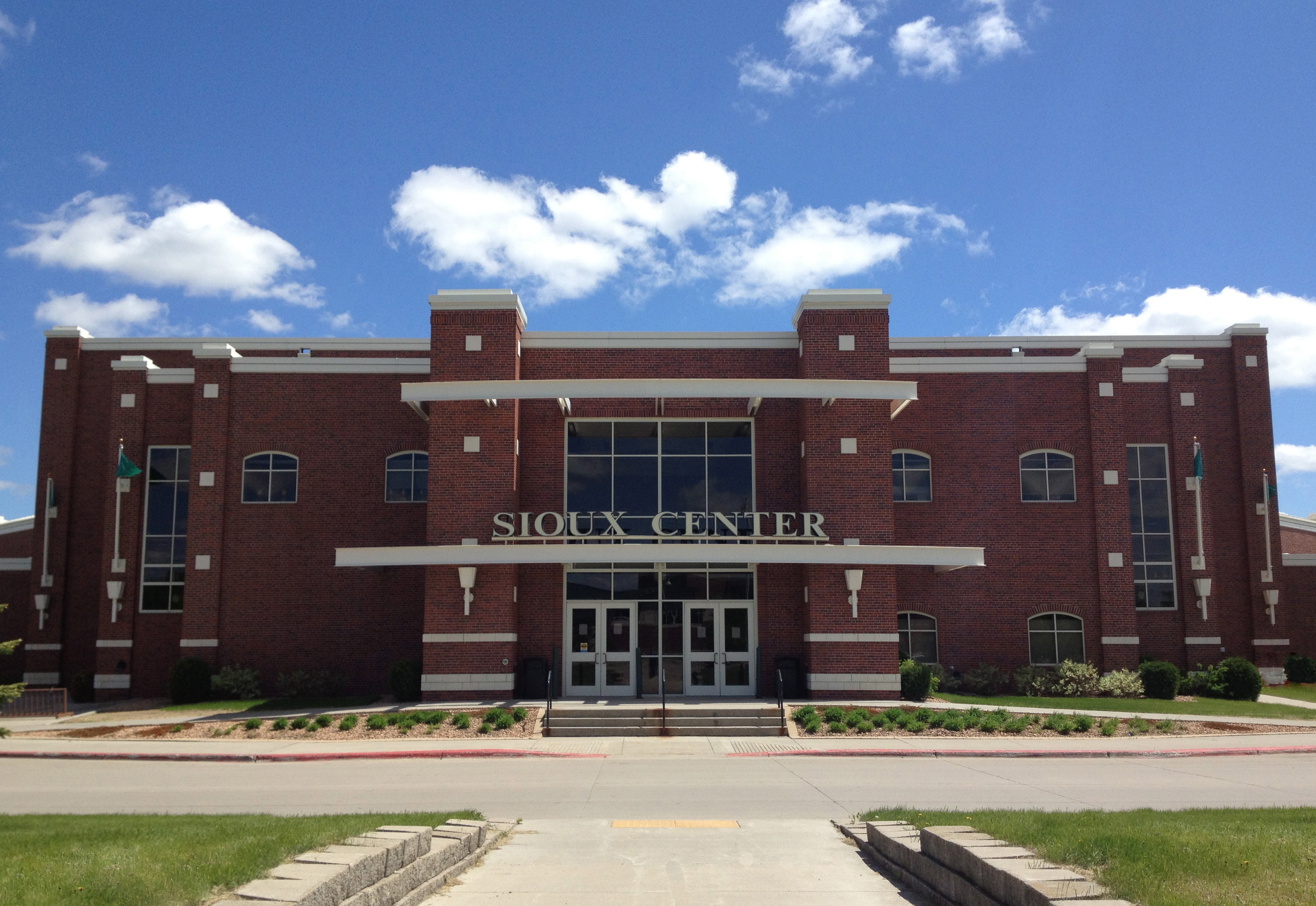
- Interactive map of Betty Engelstad Sioux Center
- Location: One Ralph Engelstad Arena Dr; Grand Forks, ND 58203
- Coordinates: 47.92767°N 97.07247°W
- Owner: Ralph Engelstad Arena
- Operator: Arena Network
- Capacity: 3,300
- Surface: Multi-surface

Construction
- Opened: 2004
- Cost: $7 million ($12.7 million in 2025 dollars)

Tenants
- North Dakota men's basketball (2004– ) North Dakota women's basketball (2004– ) North Dakota volleyball (2004– )

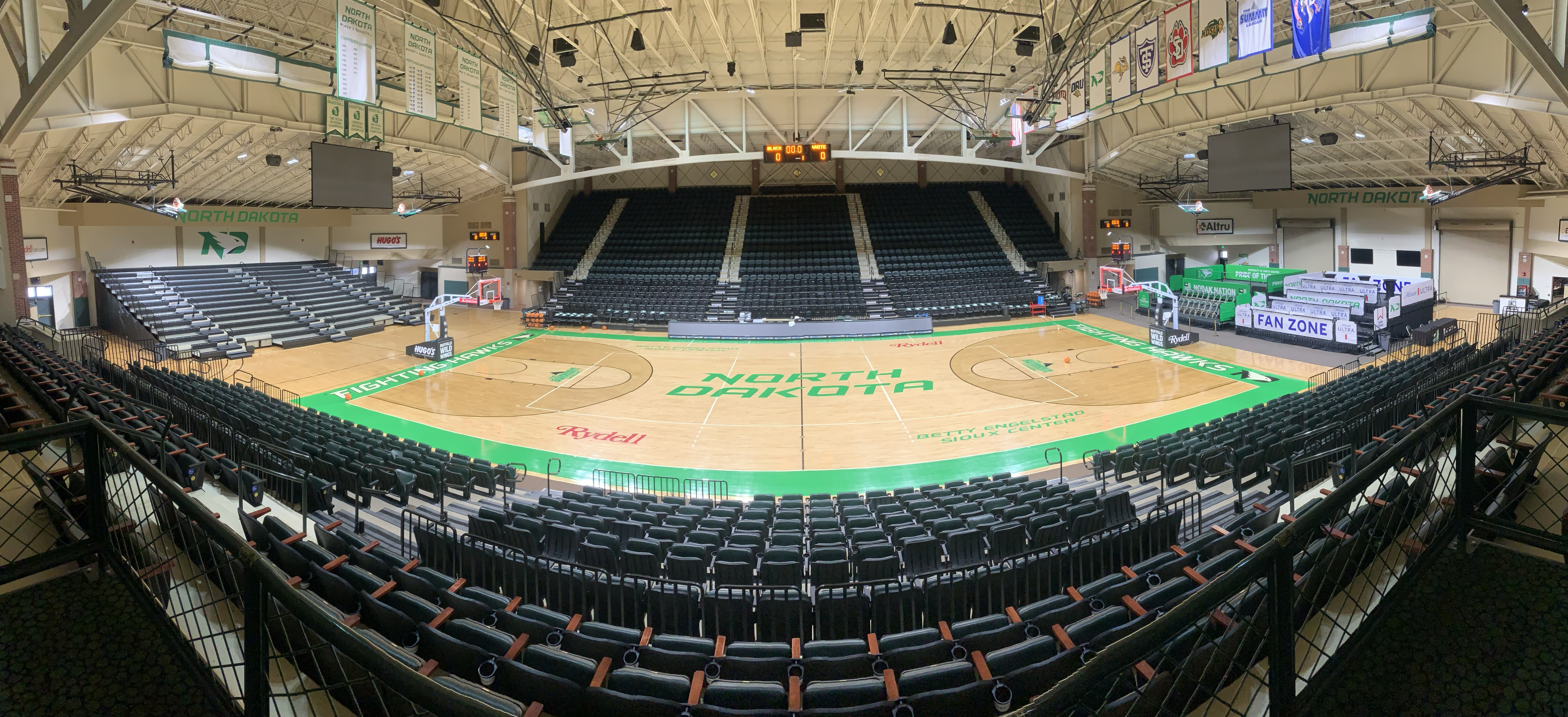
The interior of the Betty Engelstad Sioux Center

The Betty Engelstad Sioux Center (The Betty) is an indoor arena located in Grand Forks, North Dakota. It is adjacent to the larger $100 million Ralph Engelstad Arena in the University Village development.

The facility sits on the campus of the University of North Dakota and is used for the university's basketball and volleyball teams. The facility opened in August 2004. It has a seating capacity of 3,300. It features a 24,000-square-foot (2,200 m^{2}) wood floor. In addition to university sports, the arena is used for small concerts and other community events.

== See also ==
- List of NCAA Division I basketball arenas
