= 2012–13 Pacific Tigers men's basketball team =

American college basketball season

2012–13 Pacific Tigers men's basketball

Big West tournament champions

NCAA Tournament, round of 64
- Conference: Big West Conference
- Record: 22–13 (13–5 Big West)
- Head coach: Bob Thomason (25th season)
- Assistant coaches: Ron Verlin; Adam Jacobsen; Calvin Byrd
- Home arena: Alex G. Spanos Center

2012–13 Big West men's basketball standings
	Conf.				Overall
Team	W		L	PCT	W		L	PCT
Long Beach State	14	–	4	.778	19	–	14	.576
Pacific †	13	–	5	.722	22	–	13	.629
Cal Poly	12	–	6	.667	18	–	14	.563
UC Irvine	11	–	7	.611	21	–	16	.568
Hawai'i	10	–	8	.556	17	–	13	.567
UC Davis	9	–	9	.500	14	–	17	.452
UC Santa Barbara	7	–	11	.389	11	–	20	.355
Cal State Fullerton	6	–	12	.333	14	–	18	.438
Cal State Northridge	5	–	13	.278	14	–	17	.452
UC Riverside*	3	–	15	.167	6	–	25	.194
† 2013 Big West tournament winner As of March 25, 2013; Rankings from AP Poll *ineligible for postseason play due to APR penalties

The 2012–13 Pacific Tigers men's basketball team represented the University of the Pacific during the 2012–13 NCAA Division I men's basketball season. The Tigers, led by 25th year head coach Bob Thomason, played their home games at Alex G. Spanos Center and were members of the Big West Conference. They finished the season 22–13, 13–5 in Big West play to finish in second place. They were champions of the Big West tournament, winning the championship game over UC Irvine, to earn an automatic bid to the 2013 NCAA tournament where they lost in the first round to Miami (FL).

Before the season, Bob Thomason announced that he would retire at the end of the season. This was also Pacific's final year in the Big West. In July 2013, they rejoined the West Coast Conference. The Tigers were charter members of the WCC in 1952 and left the conference in 1971.

== Roster ==
Number	Name	Position	Height	Weight	Year	Hometown
1	Trevin Harris	Forward	6–5	215	Junior	Kingwood, Texas
2	Colin Beatty	Guard	6–4	205	Senior	Lanham, Maryland
3	Sama Taku	Guard	6–1	185	Junior	Tucson, Arizona
4	Aaron Hendricks	Guard	6–0	185	Freshman	Loomis, California
5	Spencer Llwewllyn	Guard	6–3	200	Sophomore	Sydney, Australia
10	Reed Kamler	Guard	6–0	185	Senior	San Rafael, California
11	Lorenzo McCloud	Guard	6–0	170	Senior	Los Angeles, California
12	Andrew Bock	Guard	6–1	185	Junior	Rialto, California
13	Khalil Kelley	Forward	6–8	225	Junior	Rancho Cucamonga, California
15	Aaron Short	Forward	6–3	215	Junior	Reno, Nevada
20	Ross Rivera	Forward	6–7	225	Junior	Visalia, California
21	Rodrigo De Souza	Guard	6–2	200	Senior	São Paulo, Brazil
22	Markus Duran	Guard	6–0	185	Senior	Murray, Utah
24	Travis Fulton	Forward	6–6	220	Senior	Corona, California
25	Jordan Turner	Forward	6–5	190	Senior	Oakland, California
30	Thomas Peters	Forward	6–6	200	Freshman	Campbell, California
33	Tony Gill	Forward	6–8	220	Junior	Roseville, California
42	Tim Thomas	Center	6–10	255	Junior	Sheridan, Wyoming

== Schedule ==
Date time, TV	Rank^{#}	Opponent^{#}	Result	Record	Site (attendance) city, state
France Tour
08/13/2012*; 10:00 am		at Tremblay Athletique Club	L 65–78		Tremblay, France
08/14/2012*; 10:00 am		at Vanves	L 67–68		Vanves, France
08/15/2012*; 9:00 am		at West Lyon	W 82–72		Lyon, France
08/16/2012*; 11:00 am		at Terre Froide	W 80–68		Grand Lemps, France
08/17/2012*; 10:30 am		at Golfe-Juan	W 79–39		Golfe-Juan, France
Exhibition
11/04/2012*; 5:00 pm		Cal State Chico	W 66–60		Alex G. Spanos Center (1,304); Stockton, CA
Regular season
11/10/2012*; 7:00 pm		Holy Names	W 76–38	1–0	Alex G. Spanos Center (1,891); Stockton, CA
11/16/2012*; 7:00 pm		at Fresno State	L 61–66	1–1	Save Mart Center (6,341); Fresno, CA
11/19/2012*; 7:00 pm		Oral Roberts	L 67–69	1–2	Alex G. Spanos Center (1,430); Stockton, CA
11/22/2012*; 11:00 am, ESPNU		vs. Xavier; DIRECTV Classic	W 70–67	2–2	Anaheim Convention Center (1,107); Anaheim, CA
11/23/2012*; 3:30 pm, ESPN2		vs. Saint Mary's; DIRECTV Classic Semifinal	W 76–66	3–2	Anaheim Convention Center (1,477); Anaheim, CA
11/25/2012*; 6:00 pm, ESPN2		vs. California; DIRECTV Classic final	L 58–78	3–3	Anaheim Convention Center (2,527); Anaheim, CA
12/01/2012*; 5:00 pm, KHQ/RTNW		at No. 12 Gonzaga	L 67–85	3–4	McCarthey Athletic Center (6,000); Spokane, WA
12/04/2012*; 7:00 pm		Nevada	W 78–72 ^{OT}	4–4	Alex G. Spanos Center (1,549); Stockton, CA
12/08/2012*; 5:00 pm		San Francisco	W 67–59	5–4	Alex G. Spanos Center (1,724); Stockton, CA
12/15/2012*; 5:00 pm		Santa Clara	L 71–75	5–5	Alex G. Spanos Center (1,879); Stockton, CA
12/19/2012*; 7:00 pm		at Saint Mary's	L 46–74	5–6	McKeon Pavilion (2,507); Moraga, CA
12/21/2012*; 7:30 pm		Cal Maritime	W 80–42	6–6	Alex G. Spanos Center (1,565); Stockton, CA
12/29/2012; 4:00 pm, FS Prime Ticket/FSSD		at Long Beach State	L 63–67	6–7 (0–1)	Walter Pyramid (3,502); Long Beach, CA
01/05/2013; 7:00 pm		at UC Davis	W 74–64	7–7 (1–1)	The Pavilion (1,293); Davis, CA
01/10/2013; 7:00 pm		UC Santa Barbara	W 80–62	8–7 (2–1)	Alex G. Spanos Center (1,625); Stockton, CA
01/12/2013; 7:00 pm		Cal Poly	W 77–55	9–7 (3–1)	Alex G. Spanos Center (2,111); Stockton, CA
01/17/2013; 9:00 pm, OC Sports		at Hawaiʻi	L 52–60	9–8 (3–2)	Stan Sheriff Center (5,571); Honolulu, HI
01/19/2013; 7:05 pm		at Cal State Northridge	W 74–62	10–8 (4–2)	Matadome (N/A); Northridge, CA
01/24/2013; 7:00 pm		UC Riverside	W 63–58	11–8 (5–2)	Alex G. Spanos Center (1,966); Stockton, CA
01/26/2013; 7:00 pm		Cal State Fullerton	W 71–67	12–8 (6–2)	Alex G. Spanos Center (3,390); Stockton, CA
02/02/2013; 7:30 pm		UC Davis	W 77–64	13–8 (7–2)	Alex G. Spanos Center (3,247); Stockton, CA
02/07/2013; 7:00 pm		at Cal Poly	L 62–67	13–9 (7–3)	Mott Gym (2,213); San Luis Obispo, CA
02/09/2013; 7:00 pm		at UC Santa Barbara	L 53–66	13–10 (7–4)	The Thunderdome (1,884); Santa Barbara, CA
02/14/2013; 7:00 pm		Cal State Northridge	W 66–59	14–10 (8–4)	Alex G. Spanos Center (1,865); Stockton, CA
02/16/2013; 7:00 pm		Hawaiʻi	W 80–71	15–10 (9–4)	Alex G. Spanos Center (2,187); Stockton, CA
02/20/2013; 7:00 pm		at UC Irvine	L 59–68	15–11 (9–5)	Bren Events Center (825); Irvine, CA
02/23/2013*; 10:00 am, ESPN3		at Western Michigan; BracketBusters	L 62–67	15–12	University Arena (3,172); Kalamazoo, MI
02/28/2013; 8:05 pm		at Cal State Fullerton	W 64–55	16–12 (10–5)	Titan Gym (720); Fullerton, CA
03/02/2013; 5:15 pm		at UC Riverside	W 70–68	17–12 (11–5)	UC Riverside Student Recreation Center (1,139); Riverside, CA
03/07/2013; 7:00 pm		UC Irvine	W 70–62	18–12 (12–5)	Alex G. Spanos Center (1,737); Stockton, CA
03/09/2013; 4:00 pm		Long Beach State	W 71–51	19–12 (13–5)	Alex G. Spanos Center (3,402); Stockton, CA
2013 Big West Conference men's basketball tournament
03/14/2013; 12:00 pm		vs. UC Santa Barbara; Quarterfinals	W 71–68	20–12	Honda Center (N/A); Anaheim, CA
03/15/2013; 9:00 pm, ESPNU		vs. Cal Poly; Semifinals	W 55–53	21–12	Honda Center (5,136); Anaheim, CA
03/16/2013; 7:30 pm, ESPN2		vs. UC Irvine; Championship Game	W 64–55	22–12	Honda Center (6,795); Anaheim, CA
2013 NCAA tournament
03/22/2013*; 11:10 am, TNT	No. (15 E)	vs. No. 5 (2 E) Miami (FL); Second Round	L 49–78	22–13	Frank Erwin Center (13,784); Austin, TX
*Non-conference game. ^{#}Rankings from AP Poll. (#) Tournament seedings in parentheses. All times are in Pacific Time. (#) during NCAA Tournament is Seed with Region E=East.
