= 2012–13 UC Riverside Highlanders men's basketball team =

American college basketball season

2012–13 UC Riverside Highlanders men's basketball
- Conference: Big West Conference
- Record: 6–25 (3–15 Big West)
- Head coach: Jim Wooldridge (6th season)
- Assistant coaches: Dennis Cutts; Mike Miller; Justin Bell
- Home arena: Student Recreation Center Arena

2012–13 Big West men's basketball standings
| | Conf. | | | | Overall |
| Team | W | | L | PCT | W | | L | PCT |
|---|---|---|---|---|---|---|---|---|
| Long Beach State | 14 | – | 4 | .778 | 19 | – | 14 | .576 |
| Pacific † | 13 | – | 5 | .722 | 22 | – | 13 | .629 |
| Cal Poly | 12 | – | 6 | .667 | 18 | – | 14 | .563 |
| UC Irvine | 11 | – | 7 | .611 | 21 | – | 16 | .568 |
| Hawai'i | 10 | – | 8 | .556 | 17 | – | 13 | .567 |
| UC Davis | 9 | – | 9 | .500 | 14 | – | 17 | .452 |
| UC Santa Barbara | 7 | – | 11 | .389 | 11 | – | 20 | .355 |
| Cal State Fullerton | 6 | – | 12 | .333 | 14 | – | 18 | .438 |
| Cal State Northridge | 5 | – | 13 | .278 | 14 | – | 17 | .452 |
| UC Riverside* | 3 | – | 15 | .167 | 6 | – | 25 | .194 |
† 2013 Big West tournament winner As of March 25, 2013; Rankings from AP Poll *ineligible for postseason play due to APR penalties

The 2012–13 UC Riverside Highlanders men's basketball team represented University of California, Riverside during the 2012–13 NCAA Division I men's basketball season. The Highlanders, led by sixth year head coach Jim Wooldridge, played their home games at the Student Recreation Center Arena and were members of the Big West Conference. Due to low APR scores, the Highlanders were ineligible for post season play, including the Big West Tournament. They finished the season 6–25, 3–15 in Big West play to finish in last place.

On December 15, the Highlanders tied the Big West conference record for fewest points scored in a single game, in a 26–70 loss at USC. It was also a school record for the fewest points scored in a game, breaking the previous record of 30 points which they had set earlier in the season against Fresno State in November.

== Roster ==
| Number | Name | Position | Height | Weight | Year | Hometown |
|---|---|---|---|---|---|---|
| 1 | Robert Smith | Guard | 6–1 | 190 | Senior | Perris, California |
| 2 | Davin Guinn | Forward | 6–5 | 190 | Freshman | Murrieta, California |
| 3 | Tajai Johnson | Guard | 6–2 | 185 | Freshman | Vallejo, California |
| 5 | Taylor Johns | Forward | 6–7 | 220 | Freshman | San Francisco, California |
| 10 | Steven Jones | Guard | 6–0 | | Freshman | Winnetka, California |
| 11 | Tre Owens | Forward | 6–6 | 185 | Freshman | Rota, Spain |
| 12 | Josh Fox | Forward | 6–6 | 195 | Freshman | Daly City, California |
| 13 | Jamie Harper | Guard | 6–1 | 190 | Freshman | Los Angeles, California |
| 15 | Chris Harriel | Forward | 6–4 | 185 | Junior | Moreno Valley, California |
| 21 | Lucas Devenny | Forward | 6–8 | 240 | Junior | Santa Rosa, California |
| 22 | Dayton Boddie | Guard | 6–3 | 198 | Freshman | San Diego, California |
| 24 | TJ Burke | Forward | 6–8 | 210 | Sophomore | Tempe, Arizona |
| 35 | Austin Quick | Guard | 6–2 | 180 | Sophomore | Murrieta, California |
| 54 | Chris Patton | Forward | 6–10 | 246 | Junior | Melbourne, Australia |

== Schedule ==
| Date time, TV | Opponent | Result | Record | Site (attendance) city, state |
Exhibition
| 11/03/2012*; 7:00 pm | San Diego Christian | W 83–72 | | SRC Arena; Riverside, CA |
Regular Season
| 11/09/2012*; 6:00 pm | at DePaul | L 59–91 | 0–1 | McGrath-Phillips Arena (3,554); Chicago, IL |
| 11/11/2012*; 11:00 am | at UIC | L 52–59 | 0–2 | UIC Pavilion (2,212); Chicago, IL |
| 11/14/2012*; 7:00 pm | Fresno State | L 30–39 | 0–3 | SRC Arena (806); Riverside, CA |
| 11/17/2012*; 1:00 pm | Whitman | W 89–76 | 1–3 | SRC Arena (365); Riverside, CA |
| 11/21/2012*; 8:30 pm | vs. Northeastern; Great Alaska Shootout | L 52–61 | 1–4 | Sullivan Arena (4,230); Anchorage, AK |
| 11/23/2012*; 2:00 pm | vs. Alaska Anchorage; Great Alaska Shootout | L 65–66 | 1–5 | Sullivan Arena (4,119); Anchorage, AK |
| 11/24/2012*; 1:00 pm | vs. Texas State; Great Alaska Shootout | L 69–81 | 1–6 | Sullivan Arena (4,099); Anchorage, AK |
| 12/01/2012*; 7:00 pm | Northern Colorado | W 69–63 | 2–6 | SRC Arena (574); Riverside, CA |
| 12/05/2012*; 7:00 pm | at Pepperdine | L 40–62 | 2–7 | Firestone Fieldhouse (921); Malibu, CA |
| 12/15/2012*; 4:00 pm, P12N | at USC | L 26–70 | 2–8 | Galen Center (4,132); Los Angeles, CA |
| 12/18/2012*; 7:00 pm | Whittier | W 91–62 | 3–8 | SRC Arena (332); Riverside, CA |
| 12/22/2012*; 1:00 pm | Air Force | L 53–61 | 3–9 | SRC Arena (507); Riverside, CA |
| 12/29/2012; 1:00 pm | Cal Poly | L 48–58 | 3–10 (0–1) | SRC Arena (388); Riverside, CA |
| 01/03/2013; 7:05 pm | at Cal State Northridge | W 65–64 | 4–10 (1–1) | Matadome; Northridge, CA |
| 01/05/2013; 9:00 pm | at Hawaiʻi | L 61–76 | 4–11 (1–2) | Stan Sheriff Center (6,214); Honolulu, HI |
| 01/12/2012; 6:05 pm | at Cal State Fullerton | L 69–71 | 4–12 (1–3) | Titan Gym (1,163); Fullerton, CA |
| 01/17/2013; 7:00 pm | Long Beach State | L 82–91 ^{OT} | 4–13 (1–4) | SRC Arena (1,164); Riverside, CA |
| 01/19/2013; 7:00 pm | UC Irvine | W 68–58 | 5–13 (2–4) | SRC Arena (882); Riverside, CA |
| 01/24/2013; 7:00 pm | at Pacific | L 58–63 | 5–14 (2–5) | Alex G. Spanos Center (1,966); Stockton, CA |
| 01/26/2013; 7:00 pm | at UC Davis | L 72–79 | 5–15 (2–6) | The Pavilion (2,512); Davis, CA |
| 01/31/2013; 7:00 pm | Hawaiʻi | L 68–72 | 5–16 (2–7) | SRC Arena (910); Riverside, CA |
| 02/02/2013; 7:00 pm | Cal State Northridge | L 53–69 | 5–17 (2–8) | SRC Arena (901); Riverside, CA |
| 02/09/2013; 8:00 pm, Prime Ticket | Cal State Fullerton | L 67–79 | 5–18 (2–9) | SRC Arena (1,231); Riverside, CA |
| 02/13/2013; 7:00 pm | at UC Irvine | L 48–52 | 5–19 (2–10) | Bren Events Center (881); Irvine, CA |
| 02/16/2013; 4:05 pm | at Long Beach State | L 35–75 | 5–20 (2–11) | Walter Pyramid (2,425); Long Beach, CA |
| 02/20/2013; 7:00 pm | UC Santa Barbara | W 54–45 | 6–20 (3–11) | SRC Arena (756); Riverside, CA |
| 02/23/2013*; 1:05 pm | at Portland State; BracketBusters | L 58–66 | 6–21 | Stott Center (870); Portland, OR |
| 02/28/2013; 8:00 pm | UC Davis | L 52–59 | 6–22 (3–12) | SRC Arena (656); Riverside, CA |
| 03/02/2013; 5:15 pm | Pacific | L 68–70 | 6–23 (3–13) | SRC Arena (1,139); Riverside, CA |
| 03/07/2013; 7:00 pm | at Cal Poly | L 62–68 | 6–24 (3–14) | Mott Gym (1,865); San Luis Obispo, CA |
| 03/09/2013; 7:00 pm | at UC Santa Barbara | L 46–56 | 6–25 (3–15) | The Thunderdome (2,174); Santa Barbara, CA |
*Non-conference game. ^{#}Rankings from AP Poll. (#) Tournament seedings in parentheses. All times are in Pacific Time.
