= 2012–13 UC Davis Aggies men's basketball team =

American college basketball season

2012–13 UC Davis Aggies men's basketball
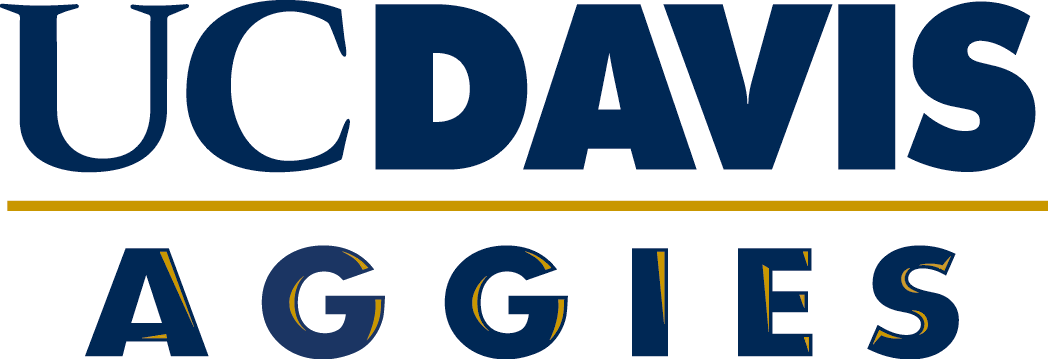
- Conference: Big West Conference
- Record: 14–17 (9–9 Big West)
- Head coach: Jim Les (2nd season)
- Assistant coaches: Kevin Nosek; Chris Davis; Kyle Vogt
- Home arena: The Pavilion

2012–13 Big West men's basketball standings
	Conf.				Overall
Team	W		L	PCT	W		L	PCT
Long Beach State	14	–	4	.778	19	–	14	.576
Pacific †	13	–	5	.722	22	–	13	.629
Cal Poly	12	–	6	.667	18	–	14	.563
UC Irvine	11	–	7	.611	21	–	16	.568
Hawai'i	10	–	8	.556	17	–	13	.567
UC Davis	9	–	9	.500	14	–	17	.452
UC Santa Barbara	7	–	11	.389	11	–	20	.355
Cal State Fullerton	6	–	12	.333	14	–	18	.438
Cal State Northridge	5	–	13	.278	14	–	17	.452
UC Riverside*	3	–	15	.167	6	–	25	.194
† 2013 Big West tournament winner As of March 25, 2013; Rankings from AP Poll *ineligible for postseason play due to APR penalties

The 2012–13 UC Davis Aggies men's basketball team represented University of California, Davis during the 2012–13 NCAA Division I men's basketball season. The Aggies, led by second year head coach Jim Les, played their home games at The Pavilion and were members of the Big West Conference. They finished the season 14–17, 9–9 in Big West play to finish in sixth place. They lost in the quarterfinals of the Big West tournament to Cal Poly.

== Roster ==
Number	Name	Position	Height	Weight	Year	Hometown
1	Iggy Nujic	Forward	6–8	215	Junior	Perth, Australia
2	Darius Graham	Guard	5–10	180	Freshman	Sacramento, California
3	Corey Hawkins	Guard	6–3	195	Sophomore	Goodyear, Arizona
11	Olivier-Paul Betu	Guard	6–2	175	Freshman	Montreal, Quebec, Canada
13	J.T. Adenrele	Forward	6–7	225	Sophomore	Roseville, California
15	Tyler Les	Guard	6–2	185	Freshman	Peoria, Illinois
20	Avery Johnson	Guard	6–3	180	Junior	Long Beach, California
23	Josh Ritchart	Guard/Forward	6–9	235	Junior	Auburn, California
24	Ryan Howley	Guard	6–5	195	Senior	Flagstaff, Arizona
25	Ryan Sypkens	Guard	6–4	195	Junior	Elk Grove, California
30	Tyler Ott	Forward	6–5	185	Freshman	St. George, Utah
32	Paolo Mancasola	Guard	6–1	180	Senior	Redding, California
33	Clint Bozner	Forward	6–8	250	Sophomore	Corona, California
35	Justin Dueck	Forward	6–8	235	Freshman	San Jose, California
40	Spencer Clayton		6–10	230	Junior	Gresham, Oregon

== Schedule ==
Date time, TV	Opponent	Result	Record	Site (attendance) city, state
Exhibition
11/01/2012*; 7:00 pm	UC Santa Cruz	W 82–50		The Pavilion; Davis, CA
11/06/2012*; 7:00 pm	Menlo	W 97–76		The Pavilion; Davis, CA
Regular season
11/09/2012*; 6:00 pm	at Oklahoma State	L 65–73	0–1	Gallagher-Iba Arena (9,853); Stillwater, OK
11/18/2012*; 2:00 pm	Northern Arizona	L 82–85	0–2	The Pavilion (1,345); Davis, CA
11/20/2012*; 7:35 pm	at Sacramento State	W 87–76	1–2	Colberg Court (1,269); Sacramento, CA
11/28/2012*; 7:00 pm	at Nevada	L 83–84	1–3	Lawlor Events Center (5,892); Reno, NV
12/01/2012*; 7:00 pm	at Idaho	L 66–73	1–4	Cowan Spectrum (935); Moscow, ID
12/05/2012*; 7:00 pm	San Jose State	L 64–73	1–5	The Pavilion (1,065); Davis, CA
12/15/2012*; 2:00 pm, P12N	at Stanford	L 52–75	1–6	Maples Pavilion (4,627); Stanford, CA
12/17/2012*; 7:00 pm	Eastern Washington	W 87–65	2–6	The Pavilion (780); Davis, CA
12/20/2012*; 4:30 pm	vs. Southern Illinois; World Vision Classic	W 78–70	3–6	Smith Spectrum (331); Logan, UT
12/21/2012*; 7:05 pm	at Utah State; World Vision Classic	L 61–73	3–7	Smith Spectrum (7,781); Logan, UT
12/22/2012*; 4:30 pm	vs. Nicholls State; World Vision Classic	W 82–71	4–7	Smith Spectrum (835); Logan, UT
12/29/2012; 7:00 pm	at UC Irvine	L 58–69 ^{OT}	4–8 (0–1)	Bren Events Center (1,401); Irvine, CA
01/05/2013; 7:00 pm	Pacific	L 64–74	4–9 (0–2)	The Pavilion (1,293); Davis, CA
01/10/2013; 7:00 pm	Cal Poly	W 69–67	5–9 (1–2)	The Pavilion (1,987); Davis, CA
01/12/2013; 7:00 pm	UC Santa Barbara	L 59–66	5–10 (1–3)	The Pavilion (2,414); Davis, CA
01/17/2013; 7:05 pm	at Cal State Northridge	W 74–71	6–10 (2–3)	Matadome (1,014); Northridge, CA
01/19/2013; 9:00 pm	at Hawaiʻi	W 93–82	7–10 (3–3)	Stan Sheriff Center (6,814); Honolulu, HI
01/24/2013; 7:00 pm	Cal State Fullerton	L 88–95	7–11 (3–4)	The Pavilion (2,866); Davis, CA
01/26/2013; 7:00 pm	UC Riverside	W 79–72	8–11 (4–4)	The Pavilion (2,512); Davis, CA
02/02/2013; 7:30 pm	at Pacific	L 64–77	8–12 (4–5)	Alex G. Spanos Center (3,247); Stockton, CA
02/07/2013; 7:00 pm	at UC Santa Barbara	W 64–56	9–12 (5–5)	The Thunderdome (1,842); Santa Barbara, CA
02/09/2013; 7:00 pm	at Cal Poly	L 53–68	9–13 (5–6)	Mott Gym (2,600); San Luis Obispo, CA
02/14/2013; 7:00 pm	Hawaiʻi	W 89–65	10–13 (6–6)	The Pavilion (1,310); Davis, CA
02/16/2013; 7:00 pm	Cal State Northridge	W 73–61	11–13 (7–6)	The Pavilion (1,003); Davis, CA
02/20/2013; 7:05 pm	at Long Beach State	L 65–71	11–14 (7–7)	Walter Pyramid (2,808); Long Beach, CA
02/23/2013*; 1:30 pm	Northern Colorado; BracketBusters	W 79–78	12–14	The Pavilion (1,631); Davis, CA
02/28/2013; 8:00 pm	at UC Riverside	W 59–52	13–14 (8–7)	UC Riverside Student Recreation Center (656); Riverside, CA
03/02/2013; 6:05 pm	at Cal State Fullerton	W 71–68	14–14 (9–7)	Titan Gym (1,026); Fullerton, CA
03/07/2013; 8:00 pm, ESPN2	Long Beach State	L 76–77	14–15 (9–8)	The Pavilion (5,670); Davis, CA
03/09/2013; 7:00 pm	UC Irvine	L 85–88	14–16 (9–9)	The Pavilion (2,477); Davis, CA
2013 Big West Conference men's basketball tournament
03/14/2013; 2:50 pm	vs. Cal Poly; Quarterfinals	L 41–64	14–17	Honda Center (N/A); Anaheim, CA
*Non-conference game. ^{#}Rankings from AP Poll. (#) Tournament seedings in parentheses. All times are in Pacific Time.
