= 2012–13 UC Irvine Anteaters men's basketball team =

American college basketball season

2012–13 UC Irvine Anteaters men's basketball

CIT, Second Round
- Conference: Big West Conference
- Record: 21–16 (11–7 Big West)
- Head coach: Russell Turner (3rd season)
- Assistant coaches: Ali Ton; Ryan Badrtalei; Nick Booker
- Home arena: Bren Events Center

2012–13 Big West men's basketball standings
	Conf.				Overall
Team	W		L	PCT	W		L	PCT
Long Beach State	14	–	4	.778	19	–	14	.576
Pacific †	13	–	5	.722	22	–	13	.629
Cal Poly	12	–	6	.667	18	–	14	.563
UC Irvine	11	–	7	.611	21	–	16	.568
Hawai'i	10	–	8	.556	17	–	13	.567
UC Davis	9	–	9	.500	14	–	17	.452
UC Santa Barbara	7	–	11	.389	11	–	20	.355
Cal State Fullerton	6	–	12	.333	14	–	18	.438
Cal State Northridge	5	–	13	.278	14	–	17	.452
UC Riverside*	3	–	15	.167	6	–	25	.194
† 2013 Big West tournament winner As of March 25, 2013; Rankings from AP Poll *ineligible for postseason play due to APR penalties

The 2012–13 UC Irvine Anteaters men's basketball team represented the University of California, Irvine during the 2012–13 NCAA Division I men's basketball season. The Anteaters, led by third year head coach Russell Turner, played their home games at the Bren Events Center and were members of the Big West Conference. They finished the season 21–16, 11–7 in Big West play to finish in fourth place. They advanced to the championship game of the Big West tournament where they lost to Pacific. They were invited to the 2013 CIT where they defeated High Point in the first round before losing in the second round to Oral Roberts.

== Off-Season ==
=== 2012 Recruiting Class ===
College recruiting
Name	Hometown	School	Height	Weight	Commit date
Connor Clifford; C	Huntington Beach, CA	Ocean View High School	6 ft 11 in (2.11 m)	N/A	
Connor Clifford; C	Recruit ratings: ESPN: (80)				
Alex Young; PG	Phoenix, OR	Phoenix High School	6 ft 1 in (1.85 m)	N/A	
Alex Young; PG	Recruit ratings: No ratings found				
Overall recruit ranking: Scout: n/a Rivals: n/a ESPN: n/a
Note: In many cases, Scout, Rivals, 247Sports, On3, and ESPN may conflict in their listings of height and weight.; In these cases, the average was taken. ESPN grades are on a 100-point scale.; Sources: "ESPN - UC Irvine Basketball Recruiting 2012". ESPN.; "2012 Team Ranking". Rivals.

== Roster ==
2012–13 UC Irvine Anteaters men's basketball team
Players
Coaches

Pos.	#	Name	Height	Weight	Year	Hometown
G	22	Daman Starring	6 ft 3 in (1.91 m)	192 lb (87 kg)	Sr	Las Vegas, Nevada
C	42	Conor Clifford	7 ft 0 in (2.13 m)	268 lb (122 kg)	Fr	Huntington Beach, California
F	3	Will Davis II	6 ft 8 in (2.03 m)	210 lb (95 kg)	So	Sacramento, California
G	24	Dominique Dunning (redshirt)	6 ft 3 in (1.91 m)	213 lb (97 kg)	So	Corona, California
G	0	Derick Flowers	6 ft 0 in (1.83 m)	178 lb (81 kg)	Sr	Los Angeles, California
C	20	Adam Folker	6 ft 9 in (2.06 m)	225 lb (102 kg)	Sr	Marham, Ontario (Canada)
F	35	Ege Mala	6 ft 7 in (2.01 m)	208 lb (94 kg)	Fr	İzmir (Turkey)
F	4	Reed McConnell	6 ft 5 in (1.96 m)	190 lb (86 kg)	RS Fr	Atherton, California
G	5	Chris McNealy	6 ft 4 in (1.93 m)	182 lb (83 kg)	Jr	Danville, California
C	25	John Ryan	6 ft 10 in (2.08 m)	247 lb (112 kg)	RS So	El Segundo, California
F	2	Travis Souza	6 ft 4 in (1.93 m)	222 lb (101 kg)	So	Turlock, California
G	1	Alex Young	6 ft 1 in (1.85 m)	176 lb (80 kg)	Fr	Phoenix, Oregon
			—	—

Head coach

- Russell Turner (Hampden–Sydney)

Assistant coach(es)

- Ali Ton (Davidson)
- Ryan Badtalei (UCLA)
- Nick Booker (Davidson)

Legend

- (C) Team captain
- (S) Suspended
- (I) Ineligible
- (W) Walk-on
- Injured
- Current redshirt

Roster
Last update: 2/19/2021

== Schedule ==
Date time, TV	Opponent	Result	Record	Site (attendance) city, state
Exhibition
11/03/2012*; 7:00 pm	Vanguard	W 101–92		Bren Events Center (846); Irvine, CA
Regular Season
11/10/2012*; 7:00 pm	Nevada	W 78–64	1–0	Bren Events Center (1,561); Irvine, CA
11/13/2012*; 8:30 pm, P12N	at No. 13 UCLA; Legends Classic	L 79–80 ^{OT}	1–1	Pauley Pavilion (7,254); Lon Angeles, CA
11/15/2012*; 7:00 pm	Pacifica Graduate Institute	W 116–47	2–1	Bren Events Center (812); Irvine, CA
11/19/2012*; 4:00 pm	vs. Liberty; Legends Classic	W 64–46	3–1	Bernard Johnson Coliseum (1,089); Huntsville, TX
11/20/2012*; 4:00 pm	vs. Southern Miss; Legends Classic	L 65–69	3–2	Bernard Johnson Coliseum (502); Huntsville, TX
11/21/2012*; 6:00 pm	at Sam Houston State; Legends Classic	L 63–65 ^{OT}	3–3	Bernard Johnson Coliseum (531); Huntsville, TX
11/24/2012*; 7:00 pm	at Pepperdine	L 62–72	3–4	Firestone Fieldhouse (662); Malibu, CA
11/28/2012*; 7:00 pm, TWCSN	at No. 24 UNLV	L 57–85	3–5	Thomas & Mack Center (13,876); Paradise, NV
12/04/2012*; 7:00 pm	San Diego Christian	W 94–52	4–5	Bren Events Center (691); Irvine, CA
12/08/2012*; 6:00 pm	at Weber State	L 51–65	4–6	Dee Events Center (5,761); Ogden, UT
12/15/2012*; 7:00 pm	at Fresno State	W 58–51	5–6	Save Mart Center (6,376); Fresno, CA
12/18/2012*; 7:00 pm	LSU	L 60–66	5–7	Bren Events Center (1,536); Irvine, CA
12/20/2012*; 8:00 pm, P12N	at USC	W 61–54	6–7	Galen Center (3,879); Los Angeles, CA
12/29/2012; 7:00 pm	UC Davis	W 69–58 ^{OT}	7–7 (1–0)	Bren Events Center (1,401); Irvine, CA
01/03/2013; 7:00 pm	at UC Santa Barbara	L 71–74	7–8 (1–1)	The Thunderdome (2,094); Santa Barbara, CA
01/05/2013; 7:00 pm	at Cal Poly	L 67–72	7–9 (1–2)	Mott Gym (2,125); San Luis Obispo, CA
01/09/2013; 8:00 pm, ESPNU	Hawaiʻi	W 68–64	8–9 (2–2)	Bren Events Center (1,541); Irvine, CA
01/12/2013; 4:00 pm, PT	Cal State Northridge	W 79–69	9–9 (3–2)	Bren Events Center (3,907); Irvine, CA
01/17/2013; 8:00 pm	at Cal State Fullerton	W 92–65	10–9 (4–2)	Titan Gym (798); Fullerton, CA
01/19/2013; 7:00 pm	at UC Riverside	L 58–68	10–10 (4–3)	UC Riverside Student Recreation Center (882); Riverside, CA
01/26/2013; 4:00 pm, PT	at Long Beach State	L 59–81	10–11 (4–4)	Walter Pyramid (3,580); Long Beach, CA
01/30/2013; 7:00 pm	Cal Poly	W 52–45	11–11 (5–4)	Bren Events Center (1,110); Irvine, CA
02/02/2013; 7:00 pm	UC Santa Barbara	W 62–60	12–11 (6–4)	Bren Events Center (3,430); Irvine, CA
02/07/2013; 7:00 pm	at Cal State Northridge	L 61–70	12–12 (6–5)	Matadome (1,111); Northridge, CA
02/09/2013; 9:00 pm	at Hawaiʻi	L 72–78	12–13 (6–6)	Stan Sheriff Center (7,011); Honolulu, HI
02/13/2013; 7:00 pm	UC Riverside	W 52–48	13–13 (7–6)	Bren Events Center (881); Irvine, CA
02/16/2013; 8:00 pm, PT	Cal State Fullerton	W 86–66	14–13 (8–6)	Bren Events Center (1,847); Irvine, CA
02/20/2013; 7:00 pm	Pacific	W 68–59	15–13 (9–6)	Bren Events Center (825); Irvine, CA
02/23/2013*; 3:00 pm	at Texas–Arlington; BracketBusters	W 77–70	16–13	College Park Center (1,349); Arlington, TX
03/02/2013; 4:00 pm, FSW	Long Beach State	W 72–69	17–13 (10–6)	Bren Events Center (3,035); Irvine, CA
03/07/2013; 7:00 pm	at Pacific	L 62–70	17–14 (10–7)	Alex G. Spanos Center (1,737); Stockton, CA
03/09/2013; 7:00 pm	at UC Davis	W 88–85	18–14 (11–7)	The Pavilion (2,477); Davis, CA
Big West tournament
03/14/2013; 8:30 pm, PT	vs. Hawaiʻi; Quarterfinals	W 71–60	19–14	Honda Center (3,942); Anaheim, CA
03/15/2013; 6:30 pm, ESPN3	vs. Long Beach State; Semifinals	W 67–60	20–14	Honda Center (5,136); Anaheim, CA
03/16/2013; 7:30 pm, ESPN2	vs. Pacific; Championship Game	L 55–64	20–15	Honda Center (6,795); Anaheim, CA
CIT
03/20/2013*; 7:30 pm	High Point; First Round	W 80–71	21–15	Crawford Hall (368); Irvine, CA
03/25/2013*; 5:00 pm	at Oral Roberts; Second Round	L 62–76	21–16	Mabee Center (2,142); Tulsa, OK
*Non-conference game. ^{#}Rankings from AP Poll. (#) Tournament seedings in parentheses. All times are in Pacific Time.
