= 2012–13 Cal State Northridge Matadors men's basketball team =

American college basketball season

2012–13 Cal State Northridge Matadors men's basketball
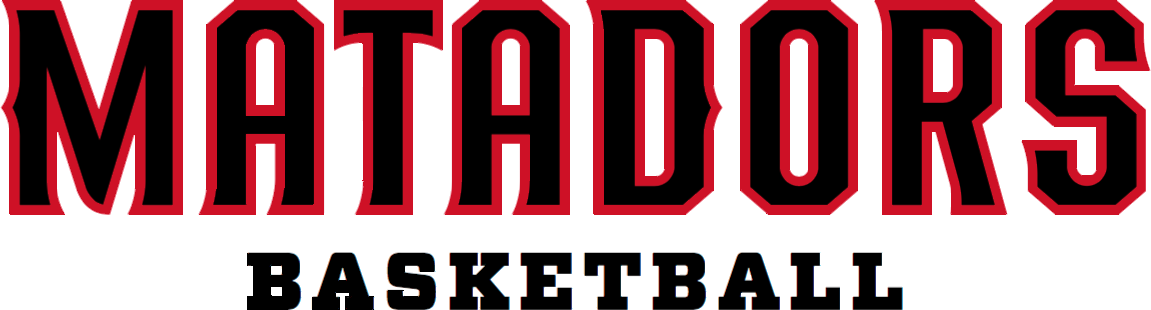
- Conference: Big West Conference
- Record: 14–17 (5–13 Big West)
- Head coach: Bobby Braswell (17th season)
- Assistant coaches: Bob Lowe; Jay Morris; Danny Sprinkle
- Home arena: Matadome

2012–13 Big West men's basketball standings
	Conf.				Overall
Team	W		L	PCT	W		L	PCT
Long Beach State	14	–	4	.778	19	–	14	.576
Pacific †	13	–	5	.722	22	–	13	.629
Cal Poly	12	–	6	.667	18	–	14	.563
UC Irvine	11	–	7	.611	21	–	16	.568
Hawai'i	10	–	8	.556	17	–	13	.567
UC Davis	9	–	9	.500	14	–	17	.452
UC Santa Barbara	7	–	11	.389	11	–	20	.355
Cal State Fullerton	6	–	12	.333	14	–	18	.438
Cal State Northridge	5	–	13	.278	14	–	17	.452
UC Riverside*	3	–	15	.167	6	–	25	.194
† 2013 Big West tournament winner As of March 25, 2013; Rankings from AP Poll *ineligible for postseason play due to APR penalties

The 2012–13 Cal State Northridge Matadors men's basketball team represented California State University, Northridge during the 2012–13 NCAA Division I men's basketball season. The Matadors, led by 17th year head coach Bobby Braswell, played their home games at the Matadome and were members of the Big West Conference. They finished the season 14–17, 5–13 in Big West play, placing ninth. They failed to qualify for the Big West tournament.

== Roster ==
Number	Name	Position	Height	Weight	Year	Hometown
0	Josh Greene	Guard	6–0	180	Junior	Los Angeles, California
2	Landon Drew	Guard	6–1	175	Freshman	Los Angeles, California
3	Stephan Hicks	Guard/Forward	6–6	200	Sophomore	Thousand Oaks, California
5	J.J. Thomas	Forward	6–6	220	Sophomore	Opelousas, Louisiana
10	Ishmael Godfrey	Guard	5–11	175	Sophomore	Hawthorne, California
11	Ian Clark	Guard	5–8	150	Junior	Lakeview Terrace, California
12	Donovan Johnson	Guard/Forward	6–3	185	Freshman	Los Angeles, California
15	Frankie Eteuati	Forward/Center	6–10	210	Junior	Long Beach, California
20	Justin Yeargin	Guard	6–1	180	Sophomore	Oakland, California
21	Stephen Maxwell	Forward	6–7	220	Sophomore	Woodland Hills, California
22	Morgan Tilford	Forward	6–7	200	Sophomore	Lexington, Kentucky
23	Ilya Ilyayev	Forward	6–5	215	Freshman	Los Angeles, California
25	Allan Guei	Guard	5–9	160	Sophomore	Compton, California
30	Trevone Williams	Forward	6–6	225	Freshman	Los Angeles, California
31	Lonnie Watson	Guard/Forward	6–4	190	Sophomore	Paso Robles, California
32	Brandon Perry	Center	6–7	275	Freshman	Fresno, California
33	Jordan Mitchell	Forward/Center	6–9	210	Junior	Gardena, California
35	Tre Hale-Edmerson	Forward/Center	6–9	215	Freshman	Sheridon, Ontario
44	Grey Cooksey	Forward	6–6	175	Freshman	Palmdale, California

== Schedule ==
Date time, TV	Opponent	Result	Record	Site (attendance) city, state
Exhibition
11/04/2012*; 4:00 pm	Cal State Los Angeles	W 72–61		Matadome (606); Northridge, CA
Regular season
11/09/2012*; 7:30 pm	Pepperdine	W 81–75	1–0	Matadome (1,256); Northridge, CA
11/12/2012*; 7:00 pm	Eastern Washington	W 96-79	2-0	Matadome (847); Northridge, CA
11/15/2012*; 7:00 pm	at San Diego; NUCDF Challenge	W 74–71	3–0	Jenny Craig Pavilion (1,288); San Diego, CA
11/16/2012*; 4:30 pm	vs. Siena; NUCDF Challenge	W 68–64	4–0	Jenny Craig Pavilion (N/A); San Diego, CA
11/17/2012*; 4:30 pm	vs. Tulsa; NUCDF Challenge	W 92–76	5–0	Jenny Craig Pavilion (N/A); San Diego, CA
11/18/2012*; 3:30 pm	vs. Northern Kentucky; NUCDF Challenge	W 69–58	6–0	Jenny Craig Pavilion (1,114); San Diego, CA
11/24/2012*; 7:00 pm, BYUtv	at BYU	L 75–87	6–1	Marriott Center (20,900); Provo, UT
11/28/2012*; 9:00 pm, Pac-12 Network	at No. 24 UCLA	L 56–82	6–2	Pauley Pavilion (5,751); Los Angeles, CA
12/05/2012*; 7:30 pm	Vanguard	W 120–69	7–2	Matadome (908); Northridge, CA
12/08/2012*; 11:00 am, Pac-12 Network	at Arizona State	L 76–87	7–3	Wells Fargo Arena (5,099); Tempe, AZ
12/18/2012*; 7:05 pm	San Diego Christian	W 93–63	8–3	Matadome (679); Northridge, CA
12/21/2012*; 7:30 pm, Pac-12 Network	at Utah	W 76–71	9–3	Jon M. Huntsman Center (N/A); Salt Lake City, UT
12/29/2012; 9:30 pm	at Hawaiʻi	L 71–74	9–4 (0–1)	Stan Sheriff Center (5,917); Honolulu, HI
01/03/2013; 7:05 pm	UC Riverside	L 64–65	9–5 (0–2)	Matadome; Northridge, CA
01/05/2013; 7:05 pm	Cal State Fullerton	L 86–105	9–6 (0–3)	Matadome; Northridge, CA
01/09/2013; 7:05 pm	at Long Beach State	L 69–78	9–7 (0–4)	Walter Pyramid (2,484); Long Beach, CA
01/12/2013; 4:00 pm, Prime Ticket	at UC Irvine	L 69–79	9–8 (0–5)	Bren Events Center (3,907); Irvine, CA
01/17/2013; 7:05 pm	UC Davis	L 71–74	9–9 (0–6)	Matadome (1,014); Northridge, CA
01/19/2013; 7:05 pm	Pacific	L 62–74	9–10 (0–7)	Matadome (N/A); Northridge, CA
01/24/2013; 7:00 pm	at UC Santa Barbara	W 75–69	10–10 (1–7)	The Thunderdome (1,660); Santa Barbara, CA
01/26/2013; 7:00 pm	at Cal Poly	L 64–75	10–11 (1–8)	Mott Gym (2,464); San Luis Obispo, CA
01/31/2013; 7:05 pm	at Cal State Fullerton	W 92–86	11–11 (2–8)	Titan Gym (1,041); Fullerton, CA
02/02/2013; 7:00 pm	at UC Riverside	W 69–53	12–11 (3–8)	UC Riverside Student Recreation Center (901); Riverside, CA
02/07/2013; 7:00 pm	UC Irvine	W 70–61	13–11 (4–8)	Matadome (1,111); Northridge, CA
02/09/2013; 7:05 pm	Long Beach State	L 80–83	13–12 (4–9)	Matadome (1,650); Northridge, CA
02/14/2013; 7:00 pm	at Pacific	L 59–66	13–13 (4–10)	Alex G. Spanos Center (1,865); Stockton, CA
02/16/2013; 7:00 pm	at UC Davis	L 61–73	13–14 (4–11)	The Pavilion (1,003); Davis, CA
02/23/2013*; 6:35 pm	at Southern Utah; BracketBusters	L 72–73	13–15	Centrum Arena (2,228); Cedar City, UT
02/28/2013; 7:05 pm	Cal Poly	L 61–81	13–16 (4–12)	Matadome (1,020); Northridge, CA
03/02/2013; 7:05 pm	UC Santa Barbara	L 74–83	13–17 (4–13)	Matadome (1,094); Northridge, CA
03/07/2013; 7:30 pm	Hawaiʻi	W 88–75	14–17 (5–13)	Matadome (1,164); Northridge, CA
*Non-conference game. ^{#}Rankings from AP Poll. (#) Tournament seedings in parentheses. All times are in Pacific Time.
