= 2012–13 Hawaii Rainbow Warriors basketball team =

American college basketball season

2012–13 Hawaii Rainbow Warriors men's basketball

Rainbow Classic Champion

CIT First Round vs. Air Force, L, 69-65
- Conference: Big West Conference
- Record: 1-15, 16 wins vacated (?-8 (? out of 10 wins vacated Big West)
- Head coach: Gib Arnold (3rd season)
- Assistant coaches: Benjy Taylor; Brandyn Akana; Scott Fisher; Chris McMillian (Director of Basketball Operations); Jamie Smith (Video Coordinator)
- Home arena: Stan Sheriff Center

2012–13 Big West men's basketball standings
	Conf.				Overall
Team	W		L	PCT	W		L	PCT
Long Beach State	14	–	4	.778	19	–	14	.576
Pacific †	13	–	5	.722	22	–	13	.629
Cal Poly	12	–	6	.667	18	–	14	.563
UC Irvine	11	–	7	.611	21	–	16	.568
Hawai'i	10	–	8	.556	17	–	13	.567
UC Davis	9	–	9	.500	14	–	17	.452
UC Santa Barbara	7	–	11	.389	11	–	20	.355
Cal State Fullerton	6	–	12	.333	14	–	18	.438
Cal State Northridge	5	–	13	.278	14	–	17	.452
UC Riverside*	3	–	15	.167	6	–	25	.194
† 2013 Big West tournament winner As of March 25, 2013; Rankings from AP Poll *ineligible for postseason play due to APR penalties

The 2012–13 Hawaii Rainbow Warriors basketball team represented the University of Hawaii at Manoa during the 2012–13 NCAA Division I men's basketball season.

The Rainbow Warriors, led by third year head coach Gib Arnold, played their home games at the Stan Sheriff Center and were first year members of the Big West Conference. They finished the season 17–15, 10–8 in Big West play to finish in fifth place. They lost in the quarterfinals of the Big West tournament to UC Irvine. They were invited to the 2013 CIT where they lost in the first round to Air Force.

The 2012–13 Rainbow Warrior roster was composed of players from eight countries (Angola, Australia, Canada, Croatia, Germany, Latvia, New Zealand, and the United States).

In 2015, Hawaii announced it would vacate wins from this and the 2013–14 season due to the participation of Davis Rozitis and Isaac Fotu, who were ruled ineligible due to improper benefits. The 2016–17 Hawaii media guide indicates that all but the November 12 win over Houston Baptist were vacated. Rozitis did not play in that game.

== Roster ==
Number	Name	Position	Height	Weight	Year	Hometown
0	Keith Shamburger	Guard	6–0	170	Junior	Lakewood, California
1	Jace Tavita	Guard	6–4	210	Senior	Salt Lake City, Utah
2	Garrett Jefferson	Guard	6–3	170	Junior	Lakewood, California
3	Brandon Jawato	Guard	6–4	215	Freshman	El Segundo, California
10	Dyrbe Enos	Guard	5–9	160	Freshman	Aiea, Hawaii
13	Davis Rozitis	Center	7–0	240	Junior	Cēsis, Latvia
15	Vander Joaquim	Center	6–10	245	Senior	Luanda, Angola
21	Huns Brereton	Forward	6–8	210	Senior	Bartlett, Tennessee
23	Ozren Pavlovic	Forward	6–8	210	Freshman	Zagreb, Croatia
24	Michael Harper	Guard	6–4	200	Freshman	Melbourne, Australia
25	Caleb Dressler	Center	6–10	250	Freshman	Vancouver, Washington
32	Brandon Spearman	Guard	6–3	200	Junior	Chicago, Illinois
33	Manroop Clair	Guard	6–2	180	Freshman	Vancouver, British Columbia, Canada
34	Christian Standhardinger	Forward	6–8	215	Junior	Munich, Germany
42	Isaac Fotu	Forward	6–8	240	Freshman	Torbay, New Zealand

== Schedule ==
Date time, TV	Opponent	Result	Record	Site (attendance) city, state
Exhibition
11/02/2012*; 7:00 pm	Hawaii Pacific	W 75–67	–	Stan Sheriff Center (4,978); Honolulu, HI
Regular season
11/09/2012*; 7:00 pm, OC Sports	Maryland–Eastern Shore; Rainbow Classic	W 76–64	1–0	Stan Sheriff Center (5,674); Honolulu, HI
11/11/2012*; 5:00 pm, OC Sports	Arkansas–Pine Bluff; Rainbow Classic	W 81–54	2–0	Stan Sheriff Center (5,339); Honolulu, HI
11/12/2012*; 11:00 pm, ESPN	Houston Baptist; Rainbow Classic/ESPN Tip-Off Marathon	W 73–60	3–0	Stan Sheriff Center (5,388); Honolulu, HI
11/16/2012*; 7:30 pm, OC Sports	Illinois	L 77–78 ^{OT}	3–1	Stan Sheriff Center (7,550); Honolulu, HI
11/20/2012*; 7:00 pm, OC Sports	North Dakota	W 71–66	4–1	Stan Sheriff Center (5,203); Honolulu, HI
12/01/2012*; 1:00 pm, TWC SportsNet	at No. 24 UNLV	L 63–77	4–2	Thomas & Mack Center (15,431); Paradise, NV
12/08/2012*; 7:00 pm, OC Sports	Pepperdine	L 56–63	4–3	Stan Sheriff Center (5,931); Honolulu, HI
12/15/2012*; 7:30 pm	vs. Chaminade	W 104–93	5–3	Moloka'i High School (832); Ho'olehua, HI
12/22/2012*; 7:30 pm, ESPNU	Miami (FL); Diamond Head Classic first round	L 58–73	5–4	Stan Sheriff Center (8,120); Honolulu, HI
12/23/2012*; 4:00 pm, ESPNU	East Tennessee State; Diamond Head Classic	W 84–61	6–4	Stan Sheriff Center (6,564); Honolulu, HI
12/25/2012*; 11:30 am, ESPNU	Ole Miss; Diamond Head Classic	L 66–81	6–5	Stan Sheriff Center (6,052); Honolulu, HI
12/29/2012; 7:30 pm, OC Sports	Cal State Northridge	W 74–71	7–5 (1–0)	Stan Sheriff Center (5,917); Honolulu, HI
01/03/2013; 7:00 pm, OC Sports	Cal State Fullerton	W 90–88	8–5 (2–0)	Stan Sheriff Center (5,198); Honolulu, HI
01/05/2013; 7:00 pm, OC Sports	UC Riverside	W 76–61	9–5 (3–0)	Stan Sheriff Center (6,214); Honolulu, HI
01/09/2013; 6:00 pm, ESPNU	at UC Irvine	L 64–68	9–6 (3–1)	Bren Events Center (1,541); Irvine, CA
01/12/2013; 2:00 pm	at Long Beach State	L 72–76	9–7 (3–2)	Walter Pyramid (2,749); Long Beach, CA
01/17/2013; 7:00 pm, OC Sports	Pacific	W 60–52	10–7 (4–2)	Stan Sheriff Center (5,571); Honolulu, HI
01/19/2013; 7:00 pm, OC Sports	UC Davis	L 82–93	10–8 (4–3)	Stan Sheriff Center (6,814); Honolulu, HI
01/24/2013; 5:00 pm	at Cal Poly	L 59–88	10–9 (4–4)	Mott Gym (2,122); San Luis Obispo, CA
01/26/2013; 2:00 pm	at UC Santa Barbara	W 78–73	11–9 (5–4)	The Thunderdome (2,050); Santa Barbara, CA
01/31/2013; 5:00 pm	at UC Riverside	W 72–68	12–9 (6–4)	UC Riverside Student Recreation Center (910); Riverside, CA
02/02/2013; 6:00 pm	at Cal State Fullerton	W 77–75	13–9 (7–4)	Titan Gym (3,978); Fullerton, CA
02/07/2013; 7:00 pm, OC Sports	Long Beach State	W 94–73	14–9 (8–4)	Stan Sheriff Center (6,343); Honolulu, HI
02/09/2013; 7:00 pm, OC Sports	UC Irvine	W 78–72	15–9 (9–4)	Stan Sheriff Center (7,011); Honolulu, HI
02/14/2013; 5:00 pm	at UC Davis	L 65–89	15–10 (9–5)	The Pavilion (1,310); Davis, CA
02/16/2013; 5:00 pm	at Pacific	L 71–80	15–11 (9–6)	Alex G. Spanos Center (2,187); Stockton, CA
02/23/2013*; 5:00 pm	Northern Arizona; BracketBusters	W 84–50	16–11	Stan Sheriff Center (6,795); Honolulu, HI
02/28/2013; 7:00 pm, OC Sports	UC Santa Barbara	W 70–66	17–11 (10–6)	Stan Sheriff Center (5,722); Honolulu, HI
03/02/2013; 7:30 pm, OC Sports	Cal Poly	L 61–64	17–12 (10–7)	Stan Sheriff Center (9,662); Honolulu, HI
03/07/2013; 5:30 pm	at Cal State Northridge	L 75–88	17–13 (10–8)	Matadome (1,164); Northridge, CA
2013 Big West Conference men's basketball tournament
03/14/2013; 6:30 pm	vs. UC Irvine; Quarterfinals	L 60–71	17–14	Honda Center (3,942); Anaheim, CA
2013 CIT
03/20/2013*; 8:00 pm	Air Force; First Round	L 65–69	17–15	Stan Sheriff Center (3,544); Honolulu, HI
*Non-conference game. ^{#}Rankings from AP Poll. (#) Tournament seedings in parentheses. All times are in Hawaii Time.
