= 2012–13 Cal Poly Mustangs men's basketball team =

American college basketball season

2012–13 Cal Poly Mustangs men's basketball

CIT, First Round
- Conference: Big West Conference
- Record: 18–14 (12–6 Big West)
- Head coach: Joe Callero (4th season)
- Assistant coaches: Omar Lowery; Mitch Freeman; Sam Kirby
- Home arena: Mott Gym

2012–13 Big West men's basketball standings
	Conf.				Overall
Team	W		L	PCT	W		L	PCT
Long Beach State	14	–	4	.778	19	–	14	.576
Pacific †	13	–	5	.722	22	–	13	.629
Cal Poly	12	–	6	.667	18	–	14	.563
UC Irvine	11	–	7	.611	21	–	16	.568
Hawai'i	10	–	8	.556	17	–	13	.567
UC Davis	9	–	9	.500	14	–	17	.452
UC Santa Barbara	7	–	11	.389	11	–	20	.355
Cal State Fullerton	6	–	12	.333	14	–	18	.438
Cal State Northridge	5	–	13	.278	14	–	17	.452
UC Riverside*	3	–	15	.167	6	–	25	.194
† 2013 Big West tournament winner As of March 25, 2013; Rankings from AP Poll *ineligible for postseason play due to APR penalties

The 2012–13 Cal Poly Mustangs men's basketball team represented California Polytechnic State University during the 2012–13 NCAA Division I men's basketball season. The Mustangs, led by fourth year head coach Joe Callero, played their home games at Mott Gym and were members of the Big West Conference. They finished the season 18–14, 12–6 in Big West play to finish in third place. They advanced to the semifinals of the Big West tournament where they lost to Pacific. They were invited to the 2013 CIT where they lost in the first round to Weber State.

== Roster ==
Number	Name	Position	Height	Weight	Year	Hometown
2	Chris O'Brien	Guard	6–4	210	Senior	Irvine, California
3	Maliik Love	Guard	6–7	285	Junior	Oceanside, California
5	Reese Morgan	Guard	6–2	195	Freshman	San Pedro, California
11	Max Betkowski	Guard	6–2	195	Freshman	San Francisco, California
13	Dylan Royer	Guard	6–1	190	Senior	Los Osos, California
22	Drake U'u	Guard	6–5	215	Senior	Sacramento, California
23	Zach Allmon	Forward	6–7	205	Freshman	San Luis Obispo, California
24	Jamal Johnson	Guard	6–0	170	Junior	San Antonio, Texas
25	Joel Awich	Forward	6–7	205	Freshman	Maplewood, Minnesota
30	Joshua Hall	Forward	6–8	190	Freshman	Brush Prairie, Washington
33	Chris Eversley	Forward	6–7	225	Junior	Chicago, Illinois
34	Brian Bennett	Forward	6–9	240	Freshman	Romeoville, Illinois
35	Kyle Odister	Guard	6–0	175	Junior	Sacramento, California
42	Anthony Silvestri	Forward	6–7	210	Sophomore	San Francisco, California
44	Zach Gordon	Forward	6–8	215	Freshman	Lynnwood, Washington

== Schedule ==
Date time, TV	Opponent	Result	Record	Site (attendance) city, state
Regular season
11/09/2012*; 4:00 pm, FSSW+	at TCU	L 46–53	0–1	Daniel-Meyer Coliseum (4,494); Fort Worth, TX
11/15/2012*; 7:00 pm	Northern Colorado	W 64–53	1–1	Mott Gym (1,255); San Luis Obispo, CA
11/19/2012*; 7:00 pm	Fresno State	L 67–76	1–2	Mott Gym (2,277); San Luis Obispo, CA
11/25/2012*; 7:00 pm, P12N	at No. 11 UCLA	W 70–68	2–2	Pauley Pavilion (8,317); Los Angeles, CA
12/01/2012*; 7:00 pm	at Saint Mary's	L 68–86	2–3	McKeon Pavilion (2,418); Moraga, CA
12/08/2012*; 7:00 pm	Menlo	W 89–43	3–3	Mott Gym (1,184); San Luis Obispo, CA
12/11/2012*; 7:00 pm	at Nevada	L 56–69	3–4	Lawlor Events Center (6,109); Reno, NV
12/14/2012*; 7:00 pm	Eastern New Mexico	W 60–57	4–4	Mott Gym (1,053); San Luis Obispo, CA
12/17/2012*; 7:00 pm	at Santa Clara	L 64–72	4–5	Leavey Center (1,558); Santa Clara, CA
12/20/2012*; 6:00 pm, P12N	at Washington	L 62–75	4–6	Alaska Airlines Arena (7,874); Seattle, WA
12/29/2012; 1:00 pm	at UC Riverside	W 58–48	5–6 (1–0)	UC Riverside Student Recreation Center (388); Riverside, CA
01/03/2013; 7:00 pm	Long Beach State	W 79–73	6–6 (2–0)	Mott Gym (1,894); San Luis Obispo, CA
01/05/2013; 7:00 pm	UC Irvine	W 72–67	7–6 (3–0)	Mott Gym (2,125); San Luis Obispo, CA
01/10/2013; 7:00 pm	at UC Davis	L 67–69	7–7 (3–1)	The Pavilion (1,987); Davis, CA
01/12/2013; 7:00 pm	at Pacific	L 55–77	7–8 (3–2)	Alex G. Spanos Center (2,111); Stockton, CA
01/19/2013; 4:00 pm, Prime Ticket	at UC Santa Barbara	L 81–83 ^{2OT}	7–9 (3–3)	The Thunderdome (3,314); Santa Barbara, CA
01/24/2013; 7:00 pm	Hawaiʻi	W 88–59	8–9 (4–3)	Mott Gym (2,122); San Luis Obispo, CA
01/26/2013; 7:00 pm	Cal State Northridge	W 75–64	9–9 (5–3)	Mott Gym (2,464); San Luis Obispo, CA
01/30/2013; 7:00 pm	at UC Irvine	L 45–52	9–10 (5–4)	Bren Events Center (1,110); Irvine, CA
02/02/2013; 4:00 pm	at Long Beach State	L 48–50	9–11 (5–5)	Walter Pyramid (3,543); Long Beach, CA
02/07/2013; 7:00 pm	Pacific	W 67–62	10–11 (6–5)	Mott Gym (2,213); San Luis Obispo, CA
02/09/2013; 7:00 pm	UC Davis	W 68–53	11–11 (7–5)	Mott Gym (2,600); San Luis Obispo, CA
02/16/2013; 7:00 pm	UC Santa Barbara	W 67–49	12–11 (8–5)	Mott Gym (2,800); San Luis Obispo, CA
02/20/2013; 7:05 pm	at Cal State Fullerton	L 60–77	12–12 (8–6)	Titan Gym (760); Fullerton, CA
02/23/2013*; 7:00 pm	Loyola Marymount; BracketBusters	W 63–60	13–12	Mott Gym (2,150); San Luis Obispo, CA
02/28/2013; 7:05 pm	at Cal State Northridge	W 81–61	14–12 (9–6)	Matadome (1,020); Northridge, CA
03/02/2013; 9:30 pm	at Hawaiʻi	W 64–61	15–12 (10–6)	Stan Sheriff Center (9,662); Honolulu, HI
03/07/2013; 7:00 pm	UC Riverside	W 68–62	16–12 (11–6)	Mott Gym (1,865); San Luis Obispo, CA
03/09/2013; 7:00 pm	Cal State Fullerton	W 62–60	17–12 (12–6)	Mott Gym (N/A); San Luis Obispo, CA
2013 Big West Conference men's basketball tournament
03/14/2013; 2:50 pm	vs. UC Davis; Quarterfinals	W 64–41	18–12	Honda Center (N/A); Anaheim, CA
03/15/2013; 9:00 pm, ESPNU	vs. Pacific; Semifinals	L 53–55	18–13	Honda Center (5,136); Anaheim, CA
2013 CIT
03/20/2013*; 6:00 pm	at Weber State; First Round	L 43–85	18–14	Dee Events Center (2,309); Ogden, UT
*Non-conference game. ^{#}Rankings from AP Poll. (#) Tournament seedings in parentheses. All times are in Pacific Time.
