= 2012–13 UC Santa Barbara Gauchos men's basketball team =

American college basketball season

2012–13 UC Santa Barbara Gauchos men's basketball
- Conference: Big West Conference
- Record: 11–20 (7–11 Big West)
- Head coach: Bob Williams (15th season)
- Assistant coaches: Matt Stock; Kevin Bromley; Ryan Madry
- Home arena: The Thunderdome

2012–13 Big West men's basketball standings
	Conf.				Overall
Team	W		L	PCT	W		L	PCT
Long Beach State	14	–	4	.778	19	–	14	.576
Pacific †	13	–	5	.722	22	–	13	.629
Cal Poly	12	–	6	.667	18	–	14	.563
UC Irvine	11	–	7	.611	21	–	16	.568
Hawai'i	10	–	8	.556	17	–	13	.567
UC Davis	9	–	9	.500	14	–	17	.452
UC Santa Barbara	7	–	11	.389	11	–	20	.355
Cal State Fullerton	6	–	12	.333	14	–	18	.438
Cal State Northridge	5	–	13	.278	14	–	17	.452
UC Riverside*	3	–	15	.167	6	–	25	.194
† 2013 Big West tournament winner As of March 25, 2013; Rankings from AP Poll *ineligible for postseason play due to APR penalties

The 2012–13 UC Santa Barbara Gauchos men's basketball team represented the University of California, Santa Barbara during the 2012–13 NCAA Division I men's basketball season. The Gauchos, led by 15th-year head coach Bob Williams, played their home games at the UC Santa Barbara Events Center, nicknamed The Thunderdome, and were members of the Big West Conference. They finished the season 11–20, 7–11 in Big West play to finish in seventh place. They lost in the quarterfinals of the Big West tournament to Pacific.

== Roster ==
#	Name	Height	Weight (lbs.)	Position	Class	Hometown
0	Dalante Dunklin	6'0"	186	Guard	Freshman	San Diego, California
1	Nate Garth	6'2"	180	Guard	Senior	Sacramento, California
4	Aamahd Walker	6'2"	190	Guard	Freshman	Culver City, California
5	Keegan Hornbuckle	6'7"	205	Forward	Junior	Westlake Village, California
10	Kyle Boswell	6'2"	180	Guard	Junior	Huntington Beach, California
11	T.J. Taylor	5'9"	160	Guard	Sophomore	Oakland, California
12	Lewis Thomas	6'7"	210	Guard/forward	Sophomore	Perth, Australia
15	Alan Williams	6'7"	240	Center	Sophomore	Phoenix, Arizona
20	Shawn Moore	6'5"	210	Guard/forward	Junior	Chico, California
21	Mitch Brewe	6'8"	242	Forward	Freshman	Seattle, Washington
22	Sam Beeler	6'10"	210	Forward	Freshman	Poway, California
24	Michael Bryson	6'4"	201	Guard	Freshman	Sacramento, California
32	John Green	6'5"	180	Guard	Sophomore	Oakland, California
34	Prince Arceneux	6'6"	190	Forward	Freshman	Los Angeles, California
35	Taran Brown	6'8"	190	Forward	Freshman	Gillette, Wyoming
43	Duke DaRe	6'1"	185	Guard	Freshman	Clayton, California

== Schedule ==
Date time, TV	Opponent	Result	Record	Site (attendance) city, state
Exhibition
11/01/2012*; 7:00 pm	La Verne	W 74–50		The Thunderdome (1,858); Santa Barbara, CA
Regular season
11/09/2012*; 5:00 pm	at LSU	L 63–77	0–1	Pete Maravich Assembly Center (6,966); Baton Rouge, LA
11/12/2012*; 5:00 pm	at Illinois State	L 72–100	0–2	Redbird Arena (5,848); Normal, IL
11/17/2012*; 7:00 pm	The Master's College	W 80–60	1–2	The Thunderdome (1,717); Santa Barbara, CA
11/21/2012*; 7:00 pm	San Diego	W 57–39	2–2	The Thunderdome (2,392); Santa Barbara, CA
11/24/2012*; 1:00 pm	at Boise State	L 56–72	2–3	Taco Bell Arena (3,300); Boise, ID
11/28/2012*; 7:00 pm	Wyoming	L 40–68	2–4	The Thunderdome (1,351); Santa Barbara, CA
12/01/2012*; 7:00 pm	at Santa Clara	W 83–80 ^{OT}	3–4	Leavey Center (1,819); Santa Clara, CA
12/06/2012*; 7:00 pm	at No. 17 San Diego State	L 70–84	3–5	Viejas Arena (12,414); San Diego, CA
12/15/2012*; 7:00 pm	San Diego Christian	W 87–60	4–5	The Thunderdome (1,572); Santa Barbara, CA
12/18/2012*; 8:00 pm, Pac-12 Network	at California	L 59–68	4–6	Haas Pavilion (6,489); Berkeley, CA
12/21/2012*; 6:00 pm	at Wyoming	L 40–56	4–7	Arena-Auditorium (5,372); Laramie, WY
12/29/2012; 7:00 pm, ESPNU	at Cal State Fullerton	L 79–86	4–8 (0–1)	Titan Gym (2,660); Fullerton, CA
01/03/2013; 7:00 pm	UC Irvine	W 74–71	5–8 (1–1)	The Thunderdome (2,094); Santa Barbara, CA
01/05/2013; 4:00 pm	Long Beach State	L 70–77	5–9 (1–2)	The Thunderdome (2,472); Santa Barbara, CA
01/10/2013; 7:00 pm	at Pacific	L 62–80	5–10 (1–3)	Alex G. Spanos Center (1,625); Stockton, CA
01/12/2013; 7:00 pm	at UC Davis	W 66–59	6–10 (2–3)	The Pavilion (2,414); Davis, CA
01/19/2013; 4:00 pm	Cal Poly	W 83–81 ^{2OT}	7–10 (3–3)	The Thunderdome (3,314); Santa Barbara, CA
01/24/2013; 7:00 pm	Cal State Northridge	L 69–75	7–11 (3–4)	The Thunderdome (1,660); Santa Barbara, CA
01/26/2013; 4:00 pm	Hawaiʻi	L 73–78	7–12 (3–5)	The Thunderdome (2,050); Santa Barbara, CA
01/30/2013; 9:00 pm, ESPN3	at Long Beach State	L 55–57	7–13 (3–5)	Walter Pyramid (3,924); Long Beach, CA
02/02/2013; 7:00 pm	at UC Irvine	L 60–62	7–14 (3–7)	Bren Events Center (3,430); Irvine, CA
02/07/2013; 7:00 pm	UC Davis	L 56–64	7–15 (3–8)	The Thunderdome (1,842); Santa Barbara, CA
02/09/2013; 7:00 pm	Pacific	W 66–53	8–15 (4–8)	The Thunderdome (1,884); Santa Barbara, CA
02/16/2013; 7:00 pm	at Cal Poly	L 49–67	8–16 (4–9)	Mott Gym (2,800); San Luis Obispo, CA
02/20/2013; 7:00 pm	at UC Riverside	L 45–54	8–17 (4–10)	UC Riverside Student Recreation Center (756); Riverside, CA
02/23/2013*; 7:00 pm	Sacramento State; BracketBusters	L 50–51	8–18	The Thunderdome (1,758); Santa Barbara, CA
02/28/2013; 9:00 pm, OC Sports	at Hawaiʻi	L 66–70	8–19 (4–11)	Stan Sheriff Center (5,722); Honolulu, HI
03/02/2013; 7:05 pm	at Cal State Northridge	W 83–74	9–19 (5–11)	Matadome (1,094); Northridge, CA
03/07/2013; 7:00 pm	Cal State Fullerton	W 66–50	10–19 (6–11)	The Thunderdome (1,824); Santa Barbara, CA
03/09/2013; 7:00 pm	UC Riverside	W 56–46	11–19 (7–11)	The Thunderdome (2,174); Santa Barbara, CA
2013 Big West Conference men's basketball tournament
03/14/2013; 12:00 pm	vs. Pacific; Quarterfinals	L 68–71	11–20	Honda Center (N/A); Anaheim, CA
*Non-conference game. ^{#}Rankings from AP Poll. (#) Tournament seedings in parentheses. All times are in Pacific Time.
