= 2012–13 Cal State Fullerton Titans men's basketball team =

American college basketball season

2012–13 Cal State Fullerton Titans men's basketball
- Conference: Big West Conference
- Record: 14–18 (6–12 Big West)
- Head coach: Andy Newman (Interim 1st season)
- Assistant coaches: Julius Hicks; Scott Waterman; Hardy Asprilla
- Home arena: Titan Gym

2012–13 Big West men's basketball standings
	Conf.				Overall
Team	W		L	PCT	W		L	PCT
Long Beach State	14	–	4	.778	19	–	14	.576
Pacific †	13	–	5	.722	22	–	13	.629
Cal Poly	12	–	6	.667	18	–	14	.563
UC Irvine	11	–	7	.611	21	–	16	.568
Hawai'i	10	–	8	.556	17	–	13	.567
UC Davis	9	–	9	.500	14	–	17	.452
UC Santa Barbara	7	–	11	.389	11	–	20	.355
Cal State Fullerton	6	–	12	.333	14	–	18	.438
Cal State Northridge	5	–	13	.278	14	–	17	.452
UC Riverside*	3	–	15	.167	6	–	25	.194
† 2013 Big West tournament winner As of March 25, 2013; Rankings from AP Poll *ineligible for postseason play due to APR penalties

The 2012–13 Cal State Fullerton Titans men's basketball team represented California State University, Fullerton during the 2012–13 NCAA Division I men's basketball season. The Titans, led by first year interim head coach Andy Newman, played their home games at Titan Gym and were members of the Big West Conference. They finished the season 14–18, 6–12 in Big West play to finish in eighth place. They lost in the quarterfinals of the Big West tournament to Long Beach State.

Coach Newman wouldn't be retained for the 2013–14 season. Instead he became the new head coach at the University of Texas of the Permian Basin.

== Roster ==
Number	Name	Position	Height	Weight	Year	Hometown
0	Marquis Horne	Forward	6–6	225	Junior	Cincinnati, Ohio
1	Jared Brandon	Guard	6–4	200	Freshman	North Las Vegas, Nevada
2	Darius Nelson	Forward	6–6	235	Freshman	Sacramento, California
3	Sammy Yeager	Forward	6–4	190	Senior	Modesto, California
4	James Douglas	Guard	6–0	175	Sophomore	Orange, California
5	Kwame Vaughn	Guard	6–3	195	Senior	Oakland, California
10	Michael Williams	Guard	6–3	195	Senior	Van Nuys, California
11	D.J. Seeley	Guard	6–4	195	Senior	Stockton, California
12	John Underwood	Center	6–9	230	Senior	Phoenix, Arizona
21	Steven McClellan	Forward	6–7	250	Junior	Fresno, California
22	Givon Crump	Forward	6–7	205	Junior	Washington, D.C.
23	Alex Harris	Guard	6–1	170	Sophomore	Richmond, California
24	Jordan Knox	Guard	6–0	180	Senior	Brentwood, California
25	Chris Carvin	Guard	5–11	185	Sophomore	Sacramento, California
32	Chris Collins	Guard	6–4	185	Sophomore	Chino, California
33	Deuce Johnson	Forward	6–7	240	Junior	North Hollywood, California

== Schedule ==
Date time, TV	Opponent	Result	Record	Site (attendance) city, state
Exhibition
11/07/2012*; 7:05 pm	Cal State Los Angeles	W 86–47		Titan Gym; Fullerton, CA
Regular season
11/12/2012*; 8:30 pm, Pac-12	at Stanford	L 68–81	0–1	Maples Pavilion (4,161); Stanford, CA
11/16/2012*; 6:00 pm	at Nevada; Basketball Travelers Tournament	L 77–80	0–2	Lawlor Events Center (6,261); Reno, NV
11/17/2012*; 8:30 pm	vs. Southern Utah; Basketball Travelers Tournament	W 112–69	1–2	Lawlor Events Center (6,691); Reno, NV
11/18/2012*; 1:00 pm	vs. Green Bay; Basketball Travelers Tournament	W 93–82	2–2	Lawlor Events Center (5,885); Reno, NV
11/23/2012*; 7:05 pm	San Diego Christian	W 106–60	3–2	Titan Gym (708); Fullerton, CA
11/30/2012*; 6:05 pm	at Eastern Washington	L 75–79	3–3	Reese Court (732); Cheney, WA
12/02/2012*; 4:00 pm, Pac-12	at Washington	L 72–74	3–4	Alaska Airlines Arena (7,200); Seattle, WA
12/06/2012*; 7:05 pm	Cal State Bakersfield	L 70–72	3–5	Titan Gym (708); Fullerton, CA
12/13/2012*; 7:05 pm	Idaho State	W 66–53	4–5	Titan Gym (1,028); Fullerton, CA
12/16/2012*; 12:00 pm	at Texas Southern	W 93–86	5–5	Health and Physical Education Arena (369); Houston, TX
12/22/2012*; 6:05 pm	Hope International	W 87–65	6–5	Titan Gym (909); Fullerton, CA
12/29/2012; 7:00 pm, ESPNU	UC Santa Barbara	W 86–79	7–5 (1–0)	Titan Gym (2,660); Fullerton, CA
01/03/2013; 9:00 pm	at Hawaiʻi	L 88–90	7–6 (1–1)	Stan Sheriff Center (5,198); Honolulu, HI
01/05/2013; 7:05 pm	at Cal State Northridge	W 105–86	8–6 (2–1)	Matadome; Northridge, CA
01/09/2013*; 7:00 pm	at Cal State Bakersfield	W 74–62	9–6	Icardo Center (1,347); Bakersfield, CA
01/12/2013; 6:05 pm	UC Riverside	W 71–69	10–6 (3–1)	Titan Gym (1,163); Fullerton, CA
01/17/2013; 8:00 pm	UC Irvine	L 65–92	10–7 (3–2)	Titan Gym (798); Fullerton, CA
01/19/2013; 6:05 pm	Long Beach State	L 71–81	10–8 (3–3)	Titan Gym (2,013); Fullerton, CA
01/24/2013; 7:00 pm	at UC Davis	W 95–88	11–8 (4–3)	The Pavilion (2,866); Davis, CA
01/26/2013; 7:00 pm	at Pacific	L 67–71	11–9 (4–4)	Alex G. Spanos Center (3,390); Stockton, CA
01/31/2013; 7:05 pm	Cal State Northridge	L 86–92	11–10 (4–5)	Titan Gym (1,041); Fullerton, CA
02/02/2013; 8:00 pm	Hawaiʻi	L 75–77	11–11 (4–6)	Titan Gym (3,978); Fullerton, CA
02/09/2013; 8:00 pm	at UC Riverside	W 79–67	12–11 (5–6)	UC Riverside Student Recreation Center (1,231); Riverside, CA
02/13/2013; 8:00 pm, ESPNU	at Long Beach State	L 65–85	12–12 (5–7)	Walter Pyramid (4,730); Long Beach, CA
02/16/2013; 8:00 pm	at UC Irvine	L 66–86	12–13 (5–8)	Bren Events Center (1,847); Irvine, CA
02/20/2013; 7:05 pm	Cal Poly	W 77–60	13–13 (6–8)	Titan Gym (760); Fullerton, CA
02/23/2013*; 11:00 am	at Texas A&M–Corpus Christi; BracketBusters	W 63–57	14–13	American Bank Center (381); Corpus Christi, TX
02/28/2013; 8:05 pm	Pacific	L 55–64	14–14 (6–9)	Titan Gym (720); Fullerton, CA
03/02/2013; 6:05 pm	UC Davis	L 68–71	14–15 (6–10)	Titan Gym (1,026); Fullerton, CA
03/07/2013; 7:00 pm	at UC Santa Barbara	L 50–66	14–16 (6–11)	The Thunderdome (1,824); Santa Barbara, CA
03/09/2013; 7:00 pm	at Cal Poly	L 60–62	14–17 (6–12)	Mott Gym (N/A); San Luis Obispo, CA
2013 Big West Conference men's basketball tournament
03/14/2013; 6:00 pm	vs. Long Beach State; Quarterfinals	L 66–75	14–18	Honda Center (3,942); Anaheim, CA
*Non-conference game. ^{#}Rankings from AP Poll. (#) Tournament seedings in parentheses. All times are in Pacific Time.
