= 2012–13 Long Beach State 49ers men's basketball team =

American college basketball season

2012–13 Long Beach State 49ers men's basketball
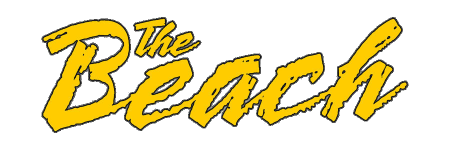

Big West Regular Season Champions

NIT, First Round
- Conference: Big West Conference
- Record: 19–14 (14–4 Big West)
- Head coach: Dan Monson (6th season)
- Assistant coaches: Vic Couch; Eric Brown; Rod Palmer
- Home arena: Walter Pyramid

2012–13 Big West men's basketball standings
| | Conf. | | | | Overall |
| Team | W | | L | PCT | W | | L | PCT |
|---|---|---|---|---|---|---|---|---|
| Long Beach State | 14 | – | 4 | .778 | 19 | – | 14 | .576 |
| Pacific † | 13 | – | 5 | .722 | 22 | – | 13 | .629 |
| Cal Poly | 12 | – | 6 | .667 | 18 | – | 14 | .563 |
| UC Irvine | 11 | – | 7 | .611 | 21 | – | 16 | .568 |
| Hawai'i | 10 | – | 8 | .556 | 17 | – | 13 | .567 |
| UC Davis | 9 | – | 9 | .500 | 14 | – | 17 | .452 |
| UC Santa Barbara | 7 | – | 11 | .389 | 11 | – | 20 | .355 |
| Cal State Fullerton | 6 | – | 12 | .333 | 14 | – | 18 | .438 |
| Cal State Northridge | 5 | – | 13 | .278 | 14 | – | 17 | .452 |
| UC Riverside* | 3 | – | 15 | .167 | 6 | – | 25 | .194 |
† 2013 Big West tournament winner As of March 25, 2013; Rankings from AP Poll *ineligible for postseason play due to APR penalties

The 2012–13 Long Beach State 49ers men's basketball team represented California State University, Long Beach during the 2012–13 NCAA Division I men's basketball season. The 49ers, led by sixth year head coach Dan Monson, played their home games at Walter Pyramid and were members of the Big West Conference.

With the departure of conference player of the year Casper Ware, James Ennis became the go to player for the 49ers in 2012–13. He responded by averaging 16.5 points and 6.7 rebounds per game and leading the 49ers to another regular season Big West championship. At the end of the season, Ennis was named Big West Player of the Year and an AP honorable mention All-American.

Following the close of his senior year, Ennis was named to the Reese's College All-Star Game, where he led the East team in scoring with 13 points, including a pair of baskets that clinched the game.

== Roster ==
| Number | Name | Position | Height | Weight | Year | Hometown |
|---|---|---|---|---|---|---|
| 0 | Kriss Gulley | Guard/Forward | 6–7 | 175 | Sophomore | Dallas, Texas |
| 1 | Javion Watson | Guard | 6–2 | 179 | Freshman | San Diego, California |
| 2 | Peter Poppageorge | Guard | 6–0 | 175 | Senior | Burlingame, California |
| 4 | Willie Hankins | Guard | 6–3 | 190 | Sophomore | Van Nuys, California |
| 5 | Mike Caffey | Guard | 6–0 | 170 | Sophomore | Riverside, California |
| 11 | James Ennis | Guard/Forward | 6–6 | 190 | Senior | Ventura, California |
| 12 | Edgar Garibay | Forward | 6–10 | 250 | Junior | Compton, California |
| 14 | Branford Jones | Guard | 6–1 | 170 | Freshman | Missouri City, Texas |
| 22 | Tony Freeland | Forward | 6–7 | 227 | Junior | Los Angeles, California |
| 23 | Deng Deng | Guard/Forward | 6–6 | 175 | Freshman | West Valley City, Utah |
| 24 | Gatete Djuma | Forward | 6–9 | 220 | Sophomore | Salt Lake City, Utah |
| 25 | Jerramy King | Guard | 5–11 | 170 | Junior | La Cañada Flintridge, California |
| 33 | Nick Shepherd | Forward | 6–9 | 218 | Sophomore | Missouri City, Texas |
| 34 | Kyle Richardson | Forward | 6–7 | 225 | Junior | Lakewood, California |
| 35 | Dan Jennings | Forward | 6–9 | 255 | Junior | Staten Island, New York |

== Schedule ==
| Date time, TV | Rank^{#} | Opponent^{#} | Result | Record | Site (attendance) city, state |
Regular Season
| 11/10/2012*; 3:05 pm | | North Alabama; Homecoming | W 75–65 | 1–0 | Walter Pyramid (5,501); Long Beach, CA |
| 11/13/2012*; 6:30 pm, Pac-12 | | at USC | L 44–62 | 1–1 | Galen Center (3,756); Los Angeles, CA |
| 11/16/2012*; 8:10 pm, ESPNU | | No. 11 North Carolina | L 63–78 | 1–2 | Walter Pyramid (6,912); Long Beach, CA |
| 11/19/2012*; 6:00 pm, Pac-12 | | at No. 10 Arizona | L 72–94 | 1–3 | McKale Center (13,382); Tucson, AZ |
| 11/25/2012*; 1:00 pm | | at Fresno State | W 69–61 | 2–3 | Save Mart Center (5,810); Fresno, CA |
| 11/29/2012*; 7:00 pm | | at Loyola Marymount | W 73–70 | 3–3 | Firestone Fieldhouse (2,239); Malibu, CA |
| 12/03/2012*; 7:05 pm | | Fresno State | L 59–64 | 3–4 | Walter Pyramid (3,032); Long Beach, CA |
| 12/06/2012*; 5:00 pm, ESPN2 | | at No. 4 Syracuse | L 53–84 | 3–5 | Carrier Dome (20,876); Syracuse, NY |
| 12/08/2012*; 9:00 am, BTN | | at No. 7 Ohio State | L 55–89 | 3–6 | Value City Arena (14,832); Columbus, OH |
| 12/15/2012*; 4:05 pm | | BYU–Hawaiʻi | W 82–65 | 4–6 | Walter Pyramid (2,420); Long Beach, CA |
| 12/18/2012*; 8:00 pm, Pac-12 | | at UCLA | L 70–89 | 4–7 | Pauley Pavilion (8,356); Los Angeles, CA |
| 12/29/2012; 4:00 pm, Prime Ticket | | Pacific | W 67–63 | 5–7 (1–0) | Walter Pyramid (3,502); Long Beach, CA |
| 01/03/2013; 7:00 pm | | at Cal Poly | L 73–79 | 5–8 (1–1) | Mott Gym (1,894); San Luis Obispo, CA |
| 01/05/2013; 4:00 pm, Prime Ticket | | at UC Santa Barbara | W 77–70 | 6–8 (2–1) | The Thunderdome (2,472); Santa Barbara, CA |
| 01/09/2013; 7:05 pm | | Cal State Northridge | W 78–69 | 7–8 (3–1) | Walter Pyramid (2,484); Long Beach, CA |
| 01/12/2013; 4:00 pm | | Hawaiʻi | W 76–72 | 8–8 (4–1) | Walter Pyramid (2,749); Long Beach, CA |
| 01/17/2013; 7:00 pm | | at UC Riverside | W 91–82 ^{OT} | 9–8 (5–1) | UC Riverside Student Recreation Center (1,164); Riverside, CA |
| 01/19/2013; 6:05 pm | | at Cal State Fullerton | W 81–71 | 10–8 (6–1) | Titan Gym (2,013); Fullerton, CA |
| 01/26/2013; 4:00 pm, Prime Ticket | | UC Irvine | W 81–59 | 11–8 (7–1) | Walter Pyramid (3,580); Long Beach, CA |
| 01/30/2013; 9:00 pm, ESPN3 | | UC Santa Barbara | W 57–55 | 12–8 (8–1) | Walter Pyramid (3,924); Long Beach, CA |
| 02/02/2013; 4:00 pm | | Cal Poly | W 50–48 | 13–8 (9–1) | Walter Pyramid (3,543); Long Beach, CA |
| 02/07/2013; 9:00 pm, OC Sports | | at Hawaiʻi | L 73–94 | 13–9 (9–2) | Stan Sheriff Center (6,343); Honolulu, HI |
| 02/09/2013; 7:05 pm | | at Cal State Northridge | W 83–80 | 14–9 (10–2) | Matadome (1,650); Northridge, CA |
| 02/13/2013; 8:00 pm, ESPNU | | Cal State Fullerton | W 85–65 | 15–9 (11–2) | Walter Pyramid (4,730); Long Beach, CA |
| 02/16/2013; 4:05 pm | | UC Riverside | W 75–35 | 16–9 (12–2) | Walter Pyramid (2,425); Long Beach, CA |
| 02/20/2013; 7:05 pm | | UC Davis | W 71–65 | 17–9 (13–2) | Walter Pyramid (2,808); Long Beach, CA |
| 02/22/2013*; 6:00 pm, ESPNU | | Stephen F. Austin; BracketBusters | L 60–68 | 17–10 | Walter Pyramid (3,766); Long Beach, CA |
| 03/02/2013; 4:00 pm | | at UC Irvine | L 69–72 | 17–11 (13–3) | Bren Events Center (3,035); Irvine, CA |
| 03/07/2013; 8:00 pm, ESPN2 | | at UC Davis | W 77–76 | 18–11 (14–3) | The Pavilion (5,670); Davis, CA |
| 03/09/2013; 4:00 pm | | at Pacific | L 51–71 | 18–12 (14–4) | Alex G. Spanos Center (3,402); Stockton, CA |
2013 Big West Conference men's basketball tournament
| 03/14/2013; 6:00 pm | | vs. Cal State Fullerton; Quarterfinals | W 75–66 | 19–12 | Honda Center (3,942); Anaheim, CA |
| 03/15/2013; 6:30 pm, ESPN3 | | vs. UC Irvine; Semifinals | L 60–67 | 19–13 | Honda Center (5,136); Anaheim, CA |
2013 NIT
| 03/20/2013*; 6:00 pm, ESPN2 | No. (7) | at No. (2) Baylor; First Round | L 66–112 | 19–14 | Ferrell Center (4,034); Waco, TX |
*Non-conference game. ^{#}Rankings from AP Poll. (#) Tournament seedings in parentheses. All times are in Pacific Time.
