= 2012–13 UCLA Bruins men's basketball team =

American college basketball season

2012–13 UCLA Bruins men's basketball

Pac-12 regular season champions

NCAA tournament, Round of 64
- Conference: Pac-12 Conference

Ranking
- AP: No. 24
- Record: 25–10 (13–5 Pac-12)
- Head coach: Ben Howland (10th season)
- Assistant coaches: Korey McCray; Phil Mathews; Scott Garson
- Home arena: Pauley Pavilion

2012–13 Pac-12 Conference men's basketball standings
	Conf.				Overall
Team	W		L	PCT	W		L	PCT
No. 24 UCLA	13	–	5	.722	25	–	10	.714
No. 25 Oregon †	12	–	6	.667	28	–	9	.757
No. 21 Arizona	12	–	6	.667	27	–	8	.771
California	12	–	6	.667	21	–	12	.636
Colorado	10	–	8	.556	21	–	12	.636
Arizona State	9	–	9	.500	22	–	13	.629
Stanford	9	–	9	.500	19	–	15	.559
Washington	9	–	9	.500	18	–	16	.529
USC	9	–	9	.500	14	–	18	.438
Utah	5	–	13	.278	15	–	18	.455
Oregon State	4	–	14	.222	14	–	18	.438
Washington State	4	–	14	.222	13	–	19	.406
† Conference tournament winner As of March 23, 2013; Rankings from AP Poll

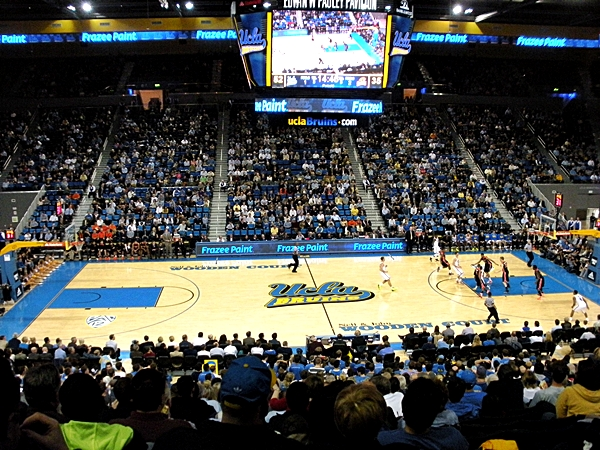
UCLA Bruins vs. Oregon State Beavers, January 17, 2013

The 2012–13 UCLA Bruins men's basketball team represented the University of California, Los Angeles during the 2012–13 NCAA Division I men's basketball season. The Bruins competed in the Pac-12 Conference and were led by head coach Ben Howland. Prior to the start of the season, the Bruins took a Goodwill Tour of China in late August. The Bruins reopened the newly renovated Pauley Pavilion on November 9, 2012 in front of a then record crowd of 13,513. On March 9, 2013, the Bruins clinched the regular season championship of the Pac-12 Conference by defeating Washington, 61–54, to finish conference play with a record of 13–5. They were seeded as the No. 1 team in the Pac-12 Conference tournament in Las Vegas. They were defeated by Oregon in the championship game. A week later, the Bruins were eliminated in the second round of the 2013 NCAA tournament by Minnesota 83–63 to finish the season 25–10.

After the season, on March 25, 2013, coach Ben Howland was fired by UCLA.

== Recruiting class ==
College recruiting
Name	Hometown	School	Height	Weight	Commit date
Tony Parker; C	Lithonia, GA	Miller Grove HS	6 ft 9 in (2.06 m)	270 lb (120 kg)	Apr 23, 2012
Tony Parker; C	Recruit ratings: Scout: Rivals: (96)				
Kyle Anderson; SF	Fairview, NJ	St. Anthony HS	6 ft 7 in (2.01 m)	215 lb (98 kg)	Sep 19, 2011
Kyle Anderson; SF	Recruit ratings: Scout: Rivals: (97)				
Shabazz Muhammad; SF	Las Vegas, NV	Bishop Gorman HS	6 ft 6 in (1.98 m)	215 lb (98 kg)	Apr 11, 2012
Shabazz Muhammad; SF	Recruit ratings: Scout: Rivals: (98)				
Jordan Adams; SF	Lawrenceville, GA	Oak Hill Academy	6 ft 5 in (1.96 m)	215 lb (98 kg)	Jun 20, 2011
Jordan Adams; SF	Recruit ratings: Scout: Rivals: (95)				
Overall recruit ranking: Scout: #2 Rivals: #2 ESPN: #1
Note: In many cases, Scout, Rivals, 247Sports, On3, and ESPN may conflict in their listings of height and weight.; In these cases, the average was taken. ESPN grades are on a 100-point scale.; Sources: "2012 Team Ranking". Rivals.

The Bruins also received a notable walk-on this season in the form of Spanish frontcourt project Adrià Gasol, the younger brother of NBA stars Pau and Marc.

== Roster ==
2012–13 UCLA Bruins men's basketball team
Players
Coaches

Pos.	#	Name	Height	Weight	Year	Previous school	Hometown
G	1	Tyler Lamb (T)	6 ft 5 in (1.96 m)	200 lb (91 kg)	Jr	Mater Dei H.S.	Santa Ana, California
C	2	Joshua Smith (T)	6 ft 10 in (2.08 m)	305 lb (138 kg)	Jr	Kentwood H.S.	Kent, Washington
G/F	3	Jordan Adams	6 ft 5 in (1.96 m)	220 lb (100 kg)	Fr	Oak Hill Academy	Lawrenceville, Georgia
G	4	Norman Powell	6 ft 4 in (1.93 m)	215 lb (98 kg)	So	Lincoln H.S.	San Diego, California
G/F	5	Kyle Anderson	6 ft 9 in (2.06 m)	235 lb (107 kg)	Fr	St. Anthony H.S.	Fairview, New Jersey
G	10	Larry Drew II (C)	6 ft 2 in (1.88 m)	180 lb (82 kg)	RS Sr	William H. Taft H.S.	Encino, California
F	12	David Wear (C)	6 ft 10 in (2.08 m)	230 lb (104 kg)	RS Jr	Mater Dei H.S.	Huntington Beach, California
G	13	David Brown	6 ft 3 in (1.91 m)	185 lb (84 kg)	So	Mater Dei H.S.	Anaheim Hills, California
G	14	Nick Kazemi	6 ft 2 in (1.88 m)	205 lb (93 kg)	So	Tustin H.S.	Santa Ana, California
G/F	15	Shabazz Muhammad	6 ft 6 in (1.98 m)	225 lb (102 kg)	Fr	Bishop Gorman H.S.	Las Vegas, Nevada
G	21	Khalid McCaskill	6 ft 6 in (1.98 m)	195 lb (88 kg)	RS So	Brewster Academy	Harlem, New York
F	22	Josh Thomas	6 ft 7 in (2.01 m)	215 lb (98 kg)	So	Loara H.S.	Anaheim, California
F/C	23	Tony Parker	6 ft 9 in (2.06 m)	275 lb (125 kg)	Fr	Miller Grove H.S.	Lithonia, Georgia
F	24	Travis Wear (C)	6 ft 10 in (2.08 m)	230 lb (104 kg)	RS Jr	Mater Dei H.S.	Huntington Beach, California
G	30	Aubrey Williams	5 ft 8 in (1.73 m)	175 lb (79 kg)	Jr	Knight H.S.	Palmdale, California
C	44	Sooren Derboghosian	6 ft 10 in (2.08 m)	240 lb (109 kg)	Jr	Glendale C.C.	Tehran, Iran
C	50	Adrià Gasol (W)	6 ft 10 in (2.08 m)	220 lb (100 kg)	Fr	Sant Joan Despí H.S.	Sant Boi de Llobregat, Spain

Head coach

- Ben Howland (Weber State)

Assistant coach(es)

- Scott Garson (UC Santa Barbara)
- Phil Mathews (UC Irvine)
- Korey McCray (Mercer)

Legend

- (C) Team captain
- (S) Suspended
- (I) Ineligible
- (W) Walk-on
- (T) Transferred
- Injured
- Current redshirt

Roster
Last update: 2012-08-05

== Season ==
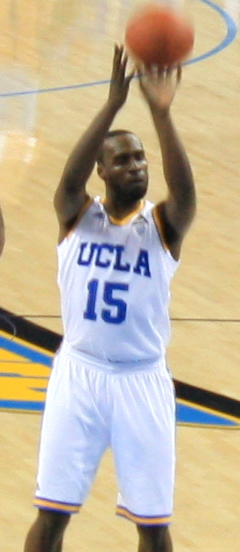
Shabazz Muhammad at Pauley Pavilion in December 2012

Before the season's opening game, freshman Shabazz Muhammad was declared ineligible to participate by the NCAA. He was ruled to have received improper benefits for travel expenses and lodging during unofficial visits to Duke and North Carolina. After missing three games and an appeal by UCLA, he was reinstated, and his family was required to repay approximately $1,600. He scored 15 points off the bench in his debut in a 78–70 loss to Georgetown in the semifinals of the Legends Classic. Jordan Adams added 22 points in the game, extending his school record to four games of 20-point games by a freshman to start a season. Muhammad became a starter in the next game against Georgia, and he scored a game-high 21 points in a 60–56 win in the Classic's consolation game. The following game, UCLA led Cal Poly by 18 points with 12 minutes remaining before they were upset, 70–68. Earlier in the year, the Bruins needed overtime to defeat another Big West team, UC Irvine. UCLA dropped out of the AP Poll after being ranked No. 11. UCLA lost 78–69 in the John R. Wooden Classic to the San Diego State Aztecs, the Bruins' first ranked opponent of the year. Although it was a neutral-site game in nearby Anaheim, the crowd favored the Aztecs.

UCLA won its next 10 games, including an upset win over #7 Missouri, before losing to No. 16 Oregon. It followed with an 84–73 road win over No. 6 Arizona behind Muhammad's game-high 23 points. After losing their next two games, to Arizona State and USC, the Bruins won seven of their final nine games, clinching the regular season Pac-12 title in their final regular season game, with a win over Washington in Seattle on March 9. During the game, point guard Larry Drew II broke Pooh Richardson's school record for single-season assists.

=== Schedule ===
Date time, TV	Rank^{#}	Opponent^{#}	Result	Record	Site (attendance) city, state
Exhibition
November 4, 2012*; 7:30 pm	No. 13	Cal State San Marcos	W 83–60	–	Pauley Pavilion (4,174); Los Angeles, CA
Regular Season
November 9, 2012*; 8:00 pm, FSN	No. 13	Indiana State	W 86–59	1–0	Pauley Pavilion (13,513); Los Angeles, CA
November 13, 2012*; 8:30 pm, P12N	No. 13	UC Irvine; Legends Classic Opening Round	W 80–79 ^{OT}	2–0	Pauley Pavilion (7,254); Los Angeles, CA
November 15, 2012*; 8:00 pm, P12N	No. 13	James Madison; Legends Classic Opening Round	W 100–70	3–0	Pauley Pavilion (7,554); Los Angeles, CA
November 19, 2012*; 5:00 pm, ESPN2	No. 11	vs. Georgetown; Legends Classic seminfinals	L 70–78	3–1	Barclays Center (10,071); Brooklyn, NY
November 20, 2012*; 4:30 pm, ESPNU	No. 11	vs. Georgia; Legends Classic 3rd place game	W 60–56	4–1	Barclays Center (10,478); Brooklyn, NY
November 25, 2012*; 7:00 pm, P12N	No. 11	Cal Poly	L 68–70	4–2	Pauley Pavilion (8,317); Los Angeles, CA
November 28, 2012*; 9:00 pm, P12N		Cal State Northridge	W 82–56	5–2	Pauley Pavilion (5,751); Los Angeles, CA
December 1, 2012*; 7:00 pm, ESPNU		vs. No. 23 San Diego State; John R. Wooden Classic	L 69–78	5–3	Honda Center (17,204); Anaheim, CA
December 8, 2012*; 2:15 pm, ESPN		vs. Texas	W 65–63	6–3	Reliant Stadium (2,797); Houston, TX
December 15, 2012*; 6:00 pm, P12N		Prairie View A&M	W 95–53	7–3	Pauley Pavilion (6,351); Los Angeles, CA
December 18, 2012*; 8:00 pm, P12N		Long Beach State	W 89–70	8–3	Pauley Pavilion (8,356); Los Angeles, CA
December 22, 2012*; 8:00 pm, P12N		Fresno State	W 91–78	9–3	Pauley Pavilion (8,259); Los Angeles, CA
December 28, 2012*; 7:00 pm, ESPN2		No. 7 Missouri	W 97–94 ^{OT}	10–3	Pauley Pavilion (11,854); Los Angeles, CA
January 3, 2013; 8:00 pm, FSN		California	W 79–65	11–3 (1–0)	Pauley Pavilion (9,406); Los Angeles, CA
January 5, 2013; 12:00 pm, P12N		Stanford	W 68–60	12–3 (2–0)	Pauley Pavilion (10,266); Los Angeles, CA
January 10, 2013; 6:30 pm, P12N		at Utah	W 57–53	13–3 (3–0)	Jon M. Huntsman Center (9,510); Salt Lake City, UT
January 12, 2013; 11:00 am, P12N		at Colorado	W 78–75	14–3 (4–0)	Coors Events Center (9,696); Boulder, CO
January 17, 2013; 6:00 pm, ESPNU	No. 24	Oregon State	W 74–64	15–3 (5–0)	Pauley Pavilion (8,721); Los Angeles, CA
January 19, 2013; 1:00 pm, CBS	No. 24	No. 21 Oregon	L 67–76	15–4 (5–1)	Pauley Pavilion (12,254); Los Angeles, CA
January 24, 2013; 6:00 pm, ESPN2		at No. 6 Arizona	W 84–73	16–4 (6–1)	McKale Center (14,617); Tucson, AZ
January 26, 2013; 1:00 pm, FSN		at Arizona State	L 60–78	16–5 (6–2)	Wells Fargo Arena (9,337); Tempe, AZ
January 30, 2013; 7:00 pm, P12N		USC	L 71–75 ^{OT}	16–6 (6–3)	Pauley Pavilion (12,821); Los Angeles, CA
February 7, 2013; 6:00 pm, ESPN		Washington	W 59–57	17–6 (7–3)	Pauley Pavilion (8,075); Los Angeles, CA
February 9, 2013; 7:00 pm, P12N		Washington State	W 76–62	18–6 (8–3)	Pauley Pavilion (10,090); Los Angeles, CA
February 14, 2013; 6:00 pm, ESPN2		at California	L 63–76	18–7 (8–4)	Haas Pavilion (9,854); Berkeley, CA
February 16, 2013; 1:00 pm, ESPN2		at Stanford	W 88–80	19–7 (9–4)	Maples Pavilion (6,562); Stanford, CA
February 24, 2013; 12:30 pm, FSN		at USC	W 75–59	20–7 (10–4)	Galen Center (7,984); Los Angeles, CA
February 27, 2013; 8:30 pm, P12N		Arizona State	W 79–74 ^{OT}	21–7 (11–4)	Pauley Pavilion (9,305); Los Angeles, CA
March 2, 2013; 6:00 pm, ESPN		No. 11 Arizona; ESPN College GameDay	W 74–69	22–7 (12–4)	Pauley Pavilion (13,727); Los Angeles, CA
March 6, 2013; 6:30 pm, P12N	No. 23	at Washington State	L 61–73	22–8 (12–5)	Beasley Coliseum (4,268); Pullman, WA
March 9, 2013; 11:00 am, CBS	No. 23	at Washington	W 61–54	23–8 (13–5)	Alaska Airlines Arena (8,747); Seattle, WA
Pac-12 Tournament
March 14, 2013; 12:00 pm, P12N	(1) No. 21	vs. (9) Arizona State; Quarterfinals	W 80–75	24–8	MGM Grand Garden Arena (12,915 ) Paradise, NV
March 15, 2013; 6:00 pm, P12N	(1) No. 21	vs. (4) No. 18 Arizona; Semifinals	W 66–64	25–8	MGM Grand Garden Arena (13,151); Paradise, NV
March 16, 2013; 8:00 pm, ESPN	(1) No. 21	vs. (3) Oregon; Championship	L 69–78	25–9	MGM Grand Garden Arena (11,101); Paradise, NV
NCAA tournament
March 22, 2013*; 6:57 pm, truTV	(6 S) No. 24	vs. No. 11 S Minnesota; Second Round	L 63–83	25–10	Frank Erwin Center (13,825); Austin, TX
*Non-conference game. ^{#}Rankings from AP Poll. (#) Tournament seedings in parentheses. All times are in Pacific Time. (#) during NCAA Tournament is Seed with Region S=South.

== Notes ==
- August 22–29, 2012 — The team participates in a China goodwill tour, sponsored by FUSC (the Federation of University Sports of China)

August 25, 2012 — UCLA defeated Tsinghua University, 116-68
August 27, 2012 — UCLA defeated Shanghai Jiao Tong University, 72-31
August 28, 2012 — UCLA defeated Shanghai Sharks, 92-63

- October 26, 2012 – An eight-foot high bronze statue of Coach John Wooden by sculptor Blair Buswell was dedicated.
- October 31, 2012 – Kyle Anderson was cleared by the NCAA to play this season
- November 2, 2012 – Pauley Opening Madness was held with the men and women basketball teams participating.
- November 9, 2012 – "First Ticket Ceremony" was held at Pauley Pavilion's North Plaza at 6:10 p.m. followed by the New Pauley Grand Opening ceremony at 7:30 p.m.
- November 9, 2012 – ISU's Justin Gant scored the first three points and Travis Wear scored the first two points for the Bruins in the new Pauley Pavilion.
- November 25, 2012 – Junior guard Tyler Lamb left the basketball program.
- November 28, 2012 – Junior center Joshua Smith left the program.
- March 2, 2013 – New attendance record of 13,727 was set at Pauley Pavilion
- March 15, 2013 – Jordan Adams broke his right foot at the end of the game where he scored a game-high 24 points against Arizona; his season ended
- March 16, 2013 – Former player Lucius Allen was inducted into the Pac-12 Basketball Hall of Honor
- March 24, 2013 – Ben Howland was relieved of his duties.
- March 30, 2013 – Steve Alford was named the Bruins' 13th head men's basketball coach
- June 27, 2013 – Shabazz Muhammad was drafted in the NBA draft in the 1st round (#14 overall) by the Utah Jazz then was traded to Minnesota Timberwolves

== Honors ==
=== All-Pac-12 ===
First team

- Larry Drew II
- Shabazz Muhammad

Second team

- Kyle Anderson

=== Pac-12 All-Freshman ===
- Kyle Anderson
- Shabazz Muhammad

== See also ==
- List of UCLA Bruins in the NBA
