= 2012–13 USC Trojans men's basketball team =

American college basketball season

2012–13 USC Trojans men's basketball
- Conference: Pac-12 Conference
- Record: 14–18 (9–9 Pac-12)
- Head coach: Kevin O'Neill (4th year, Fired on Jan. 19); Bob Cantu (Interim Coach)
- Assistant coaches: Dieter Horton; Tony Miller
- Home arena: Galen Center

2012–13 Pac-12 Conference men's basketball standings
	Conf.				Overall
Team	W		L	PCT	W		L	PCT
No. 24 UCLA	13	–	5	.722	25	–	10	.714
No. 25 Oregon †	12	–	6	.667	28	–	9	.757
No. 21 Arizona	12	–	6	.667	27	–	8	.771
California	12	–	6	.667	21	–	12	.636
Colorado	10	–	8	.556	21	–	12	.636
Arizona State	9	–	9	.500	22	–	13	.629
Stanford	9	–	9	.500	19	–	15	.559
Washington	9	–	9	.500	18	–	16	.529
USC	9	–	9	.500	14	–	18	.438
Utah	5	–	13	.278	15	–	18	.455
Oregon State	4	–	14	.222	14	–	18	.438
Washington State	4	–	14	.222	13	–	19	.406
† Conference tournament winner As of March 23, 2013; Rankings from AP Poll

The 2012–13 USC Trojans men's basketball team represented the University of Southern California during the 2012–13 NCAA Division I men's basketball season. They were led by fourth year head coach Kevin O'Neill until January 14 when O'Neill was fired. Bob Cantu was named as an interim head coach for the remainder. They played their home games at the Galen Center and were members of the Pac-12 Conference. They finished the season 14–18, 9–9 in Pac-12 play to finish in a four-way tie for sixth place. They lost in the first round of the Pac-12 tournament to Utah.

== Roster ==
Number	Name	Position	Height	Weight	Year	Hometown
0	Renaldo Woolridge	Forward	6–9	220	Senior	Sherman Oaks, California
1	Jio Fontan	Guard	6–0	175	RS Senior	Paterson, New Jersey
2	Greg Allen	Guard	6–3	180	Senior	Eureka, California
4	Tyler Sugiyama	Guard	5–10	150	RS Junior	Winnetka, Illinois
5	Ari Stewart	Forward	6–7	205	RS Junior	Marietta, Georgia
13	Chass Bryan	Guard	5–9	165	Freshman	Oak Park, California
14	Dewayne Dedmon	Forward	7–0	255	RS Junior	Lancaster, California
15	Brendyn Taylor	Guard	6–2	185	Freshman	Los Angeles, California
20	J.T. Terrell	Guard	6–3	185	Junior	Burlington, North Carolina
21	Aaron Fuller	Forward	6–6	235	RS Senior	Mesa, Arizona
22	Byron Wesley	Guard	6–5	210	Sophomore	Etiwanda, California
24	Daniel Munoz	Guard	5–10	175	Senior	Coto de Caza, California
31	James Blasczyk	Center	7–1	260	Senior	Friendswood, Texas
34	Eric Wise	Forward	6–6	240	RS Senior	Riverside, California
42	Strahinja Gavrilović	Forward	6–9	225	Freshman	Kragujevac, Serbia
55	Omar Oraby	Center	7–2	270	Junior	Cairo, Egypt

== 2012–13 Schedule and results ==
Date time, TV	Rank^{#}	Opponent^{#}	Result	Record	Site (attendance) city, state
Regular season
11/09/2012*; 8:00 pm, P12N		Coppin State; Maui Invitational Tournament Opening Round	W 87–73	1–0	Galen Center (4,157); Los Angeles, CA
11/13/2012*; 6:30 pm, P12N		Long Beach State	W 62–44	2–0	Galen Center (3,756); Los Angeles, CA
11/19/2012*; 9:00 pm, ESPN2		vs. Illinois; Maui Invitational Tournament quarterfinals	L 64–94	2–1	Lahaina Civic Center (2,400); Maui, HI
11/20/2012*; 2:00 pm, ESPN2		vs. Texas; Maui Invitational Tournament Consolation round	W 59–53 ^{OT}	3–1	Lahaina Civic Center (2,400); Maui, HI
11/21/2012*; 2:00 pm, ESPN2		vs. Marquette; Maui Invitational Tournament 5th place	L 64–72	3–2	Lahaina Civic Center (2,400); Maui, HI
11/25/2012*; 7:00 pm, FSN		No. 25 San Diego State	L 60–66	3–3	Galen Center (4,421); Los Angeles, CA
12/03/2012*; 5:00 pm, BTN		at Nebraska	L 51–63	3–4	Bob Devaney Sports Center (10,045); Lincoln, NE
12/05/2012*; 7:00 pm, CBSSN		at No. 18 New Mexico	L 67–75	3–5	The Pit (15,241); Albuquerque, NM
12/08/2012*; 7:30 pm, P12N		No. 14 Minnesota	L 57–71	3–6	Galen Center (3,271); Los Angeles, CA
12/15/2012*; 4:00 pm, P12N		UC Riverside	W 70–26	4–6	Galen Center (4,132); Los Angeles, CA
12/20/2012*; 8:00 pm, P12N		UC Irvine	L 54–61	4–7	Galen Center (3,879); Los Angeles, CA
12/22/2012*; 10:30 am, FSN		at Georgia	L 56–64	4–8	Stegeman Coliseum (6,227); Athens, GA
12/30/2012*; 4:00 pm, P12N		Dayton	W 63–61 ^{OT}	5–8	Galen Center (4,113); Los Angeles, CA
01/03/2013; 7:00 pm, ESPNU		Stanford	W 71–69	6–8 (1–0)	Galen Center (3,026); Los Angeles, CA
01/05/2013; 8:00 pm, FSN		California	L 64–72	6–9 (1–1)	Galen Center (4,372); Los Angeles, CA
01/10/2013; 7:00 pm, ESPNU		at Colorado	L 60–66	6–10 (1–2)	Coors Events Center (10,344); Boulder, CO
01/12/2013; 3:00 pm, P12N		at Utah	W 76–59	7–10 (2–2)	Jon M. Huntsman Center (11,027); Salt Lake City, UT
01/17/2013; 8:00 pm, ESPNU		No. 21 Oregon	L 74–76	7–11 (2–3)	Galen Center (4,722); Los Angeles, CA
01/19/2013; 5:00 pm, P12N		Oregon State	W 69–68	8–11 (3–3)	Galen Center (3,963); Los Angeles, CA
01/24/2013; 7:30 pm, P12N		at Arizona State	L 93–98 ^{OT}	8–12 (3–4)	Wells Fargo Arena (6,018); Tempe, AZ
01/26/2013; 4:00 pm, ESPNU		at No. 6 Arizona	L 50–74	8–13 (3–5)	McKale Center (14,578); Tucson, AZ
01/30/2013; 7:00 pm, P12N		at UCLA	W 75–71 ^{OT}	9–13 (4–5)	Pauley Pavilion (12,821); Los Angeles, CA
02/07/2013; 8:30 pm, P12N		Washington State	W 72–68	10–13 (5–5)	Galen Center (3,629); Los Angeles, CA
02/10/2013; 7:00 pm, FSN		Washington	W 71–60	11–13 (6–5)	Galen Center (4,214); Los Angeles, CA
02/14/2013; 8:00 pm, ESPNU		at Stanford	W 65–64	12–13 (7–5)	Maples Pavilion (4,367); Stanford, CA
02/17/2013; 7:00 pm, FSN		at California	L 68–76	12–14 (7–6)	Haas Pavilion (9,127); Berkeley, CA
02/24/2013; 12:30 pm, FSN		UCLA	L 59–75	12–15 (7–7)	Galen Center (7,984); Los Angeles, CA
02/27/2013; 6:30 pm, P12N		No. 11 Arizona	W 89–78	13–15 (8–7)	Galen Center (4,207); Los Angeles, CA
03/02/2013; 12:00 pm, FSN		Arizona State	W 57–56	14–15 (9–7)	Galen Center (4,034); Los Angeles, CA
03/06/2013; 8:30 pm, P12N		at Washington	L 57–65	14–16 (9–8)	Alaska Airlines Arena (7,753); Seattle, WA
03/09/2013; 3:30 pm, P12N		at Washington State	L 51–76	14–17 (9–9)	Beasley Coliseum (4,254); Pullman, WA
Pac-12 tournament
03/13/2013; 6:00 pm, P12N		vs. Utah; First Round	L 66–69	14–18	MGM Grand Garden Arena (8,566); Paradise, NV
*Non-conference game. ^{#}Rankings from AP Poll. (#) Tournament seedings in parentheses. All times are in Pacific Time.

== Notes ==
- January 14, 2013 – Head coach Kevin O'Neill was removed as head coach and associate head coach Bob Cantu took over as interim head coach, athletic director Pat Haden announced.
