= 2013 Big West Conference men's basketball tournament =

- Big West tournament Logo
- Classification: Division I
- Season: 2012–13
- Teams: 8
- Site: Honda Center; Anaheim, California
- Champions: Pacific (5th title)
- Television: ESPNU, ESPN2

2012–13 Big West men's basketball standings
	Conf.				Overall
Team	W		L	PCT	W		L	PCT
Long Beach State	14	–	4	.778	19	–	14	.576
Pacific †	13	–	5	.722	22	–	13	.629
Cal Poly	12	–	6	.667	18	–	14	.563
UC Irvine	11	–	7	.611	21	–	16	.568
Hawai'i	10	–	8	.556	17	–	13	.567
UC Davis	9	–	9	.500	14	–	17	.452
UC Santa Barbara	7	–	11	.389	11	–	20	.355
Cal State Fullerton	6	–	12	.333	14	–	18	.438
Cal State Northridge	5	–	13	.278	14	–	17	.452
UC Riverside*	3	–	15	.167	6	–	25	.194
† 2013 Big West tournament winner As of March 25, 2013; Rankings from AP Poll *ineligible for postseason play due to APR penalties

The 2013 Big West Conference men's basketball tournament took place March 14–16, 2013 at the Honda Center in Anaheim, California. The Tournament was previously held at the Anaheim Convention Center. The winner of the tournament received the conference's automatic bid to the 2013 NCAA Division I men's basketball tournament.

== Format ==
The top eight teams qualified for the 2013 Big West tournament. In the Semifinals the highest seed played the lowest seed, while the remaining two teams matched up. UC Riverside was ineligible for postseason play, and did not compete in the tournament. Cal State Northridge finished 9th, and didn't qualify to play in the Big West tournament.

== Bracket ==
Quarterfinals; March 14, 2013; FSSD/FS Prime Ticket/FCS Pacific
1	Long Beach State	75
8	Cal State Fullerton	66
4	UC Irvine	71
5	Hawaii	60
3	Cal Poly	64
6	UC Davis	41
2	Pacific	71
7	UC Santa Barbara	68

Semifinals; March 15, 2013; ESPNU
1	Long Beach State	60
4	UC Irvine	67
3	Cal Poly	53
2	Pacific	55

Championship Game; March 16, 2013; ESPN2
4	UC Irvine	55
2	Pacific	64
