= Robert A. Mott Athletics Center =

Indoor arena in California Polytechnic State University

Mott Athletics Center
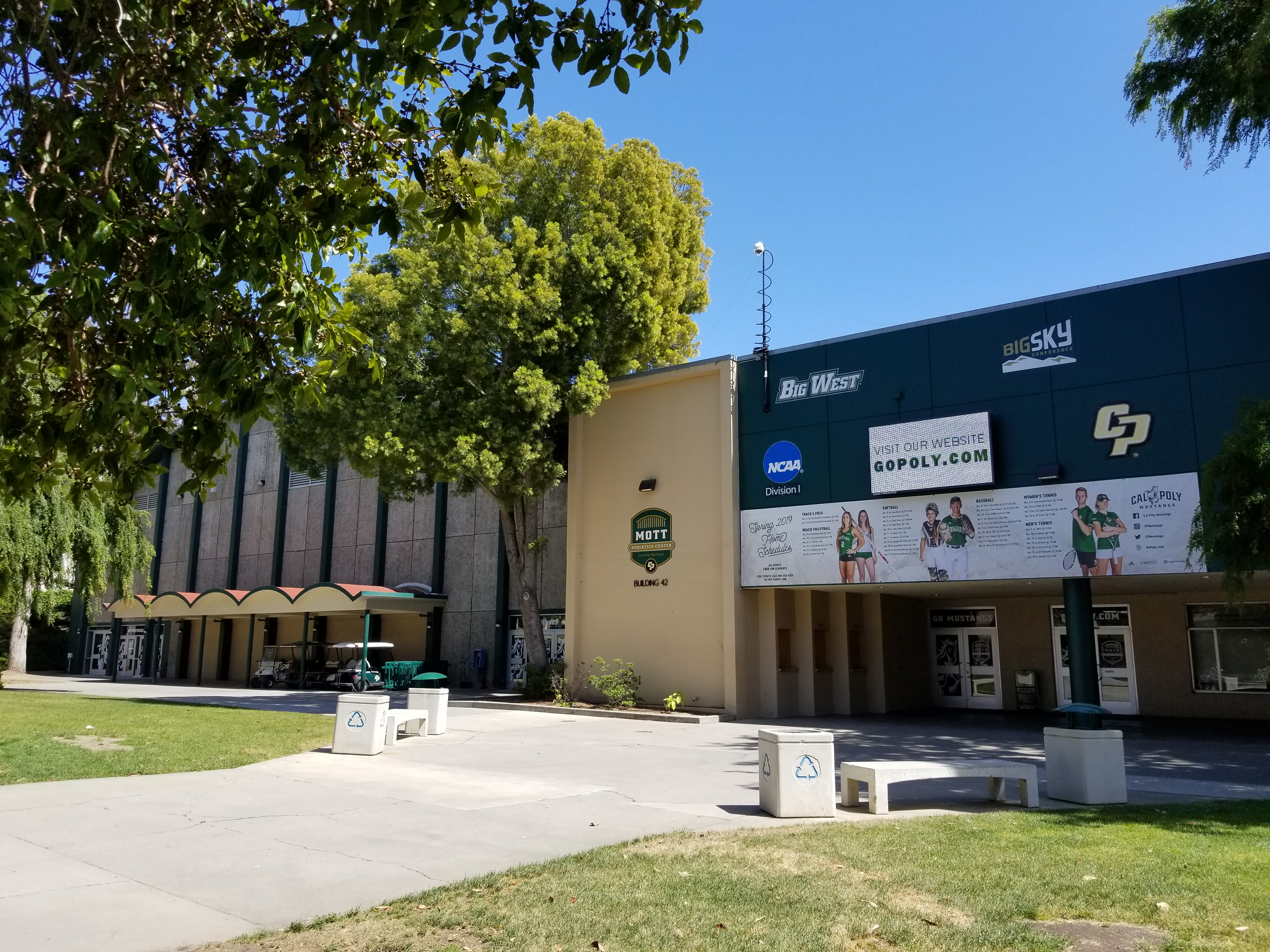
- Interactive map of Mott Athletics Center
- Full name: Robert A. Mott Athletics Center
- Former names: Mott Gym (1988-2012) Main Gym (1960-1987)
- Address: 1 Grand Ave., Building 42; San Luis Obispo, CA; USA
- Location: South Perimeter Road; San Luis Obispo, CA 93407
- Coordinates: 35.29886°N 120.65855°W
- Owner: Cal Poly
- Operator: California Polytechnic State University
- Capacity: 3,032
- Surface: Southern White Pine
- Record attendance: 3,217 (NCAA basketball, March 14, 1981); 3,500 (Golden State Warriors training camp, October 8, 1995); 3,500 (NCAA College Division Wrestling Finals, March 15, 1969)

Construction
- Built: 1959
- Opened: 15 January 1960
- Renovated: 1998; 2014
- Years active: 1960-present
- Cost: $2.2 million (1960)

Tenants
- Cal Poly Mustangs men's basketball Cal Poly Mustangs women's basketball Cal Poly Mustangs women's volleyball Cal Poly Mustangs men's wrestling

The Robert A. Mott Athletics Center (formerly Mott Gym) is a 3,032-seat, indoor multi-purpose arena on the campus of California Polytechnic State University in San Luis Obispo, California.

== History ==
With Cal Poly officials looking for a larger alternative to the previously used Crandall Gym on campus, construction for the new multi-purpose arena was well underway by April 1959. The complex's cost totaled a reported $2 million as of September 1959 (covering not only the gym itself but also surrounding practice courts and a field), with construction contracted to Maino Construction Company of San Luis Obispo. (In years since, the surrounding practice surfaces have been remade into a parking garage, a beach volleyball court and a recreation center.) Costs ultimately totaled $2.2 million by the time of the complex's opening in January 1960.

The arena officially opened on January 15, 1960 for a game between the Cal Poly men's basketball team and San Diego State.

The gym was named after Robert A. Mott (at the time referred to as "Mott Gym") on September 24, 1988. Mott had been a physical education faculty member and department head at Cal Poly between 1946-1978.

Following an elevation to Division I of the NCAA, the Cal Poly men's basketball team saw its attendance jump from an average of 926 fans in 1994-95 to 2,901 spectators by 1996-97, coinciding with season ticket sales skyrocketing from 36 in 1995-96 to 1,140 by 1997-98, prompting designs for a $1.2 million renovation to the building's seating.

Soon after, the facility underwent major renovations beginning in the summer of 1998 by local construction firm Santa Margarita Construction Corp. The seating was completely redone and arena-style chairbacks were added to Mott Athletics Center in addition to upgraded heating and ventilation systems.

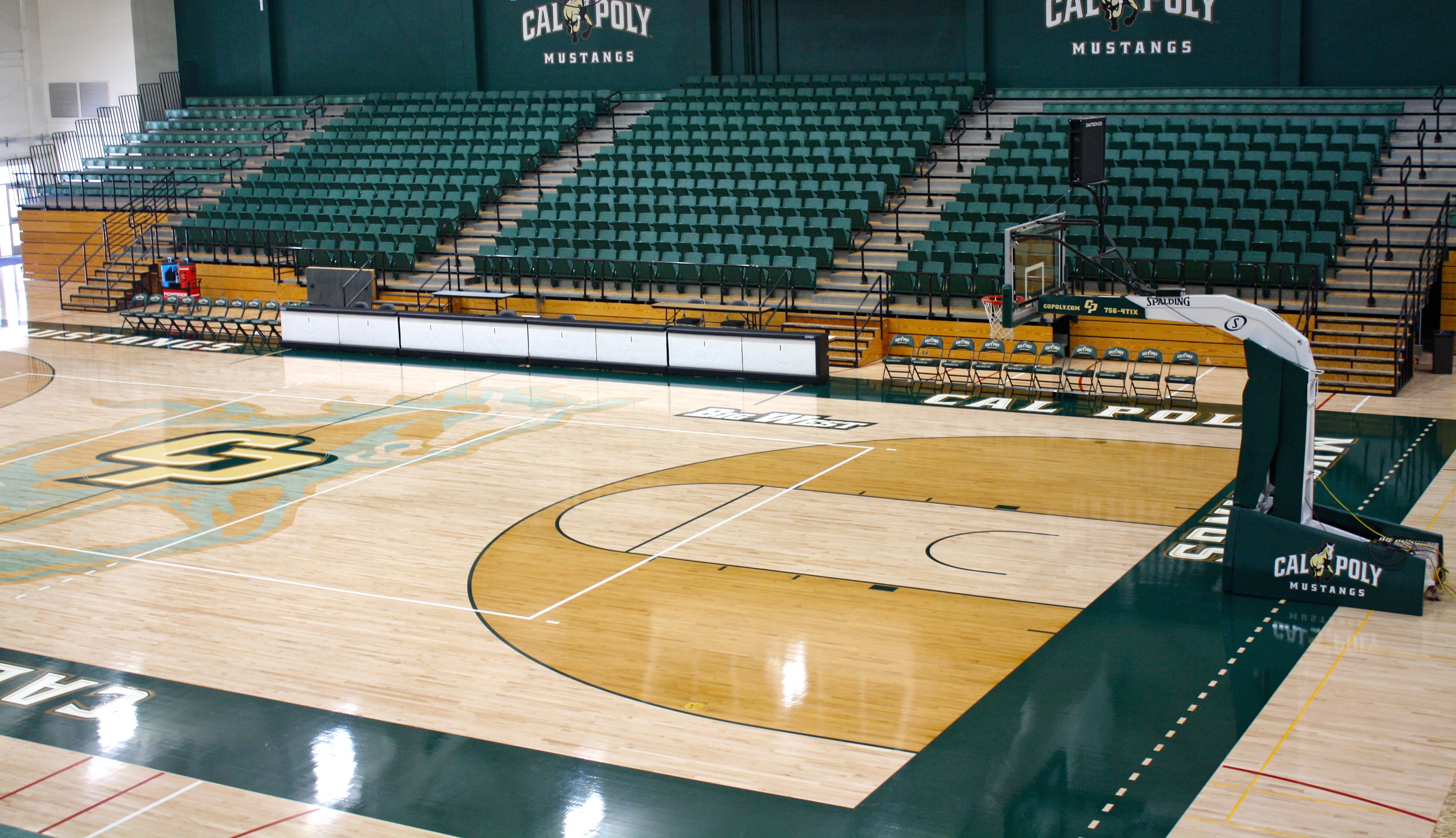
Cal Poly's Mott Athletics Center in San Luis Obispo, Calif., home to NCAA basketball, volleyball and wrestling events, is shown in 2015.

On January 9, 1999, the first nationally televised game at Mott Athletics Center took place, as ESPN2 carried a game between Cal Poly and Idaho. Several games have since been broadcast regionally and nationally live on Fox Sports West, ESPNU, Spectrum SportsNet (LA), and CBS Sports Network, often before capacity crowds.

The building took on its modernized formal title of Mott Athletics Center in mid-January 2013.

Mott Athletics Center underwent another significant renovation in the summer of 2014, including a repainted court design, the addition of two new 22-by-17-foot (6.7 by 5.2 m) Daktronics video boards and the implementation of new LED-advertising courtside panels.

=== Conference and NCAA championship events ===
- Cal Poly hosted the 1969 NCAA College Division Wrestling Championships in the facility, winning the national title with a then-division record of 127 team points. On March 15, 1969, according to the San Luis Obispo Tribune, "the Saturday night finals attracted 4,000-plus fans to the Cal Poly gym. The 'official head count' was announced at 3,500 but that figure did not take into consideration the fans already in the gym when the count was started."
- In March 1981, the men's basketball team hosted New Hampshire College (now Southern New Hampshire University) in the Division II NCAA Tournament Elite Eight. Cal Poly won 77-73 to advance to the Final Four, with a crowd of 3,217 (at the time a facility record for basketball) in attendance.
- Mott Athletics Center hosted the 1994 and 2005 Pac-10 Wrestling Championships, with the total attendance for the latter two-day four-session event totaling 7,738. The Mustangs finished the meet in fourth place and crowned one individual champion, Vic Moreno at 125 pounds (57 kg). At the 1994 meet, Oregon State won the team title, before Arizona State won the 2005 conference championship.
- In 2006, Mott Athletics Center was home to the first and second rounds of the NCAA volleyball tournament, each with sold-out crowds. Cal Poly defeated Michigan 3-1 before falling to Cal 3-1.

=== NBA and ABA training camps and exhibitions ===
- On October 11, 1962, Cal Poly hosted a preseason exhibition in Mott Athletics Center between the Los Angeles Lakers and San Francisco Warriors, the clubs' only exhibition to be played in-state that year. The Lakers, led by Jerry West and Elgin Baylor, defeated fellow Pro Basketball Hall of Fame member Wilt Chamberlain and his Warriors, 110-96. It was actually the Lakers' second preseason contest in Mott, as on Oct. 2, 1961, the Boston Celtics, led by Hall of Famers Bill Russell and Sam Jones, earned a 121-116 win before a near-capacity crowd. Jones scored a team-high 26 points in the win, while Russell added 21. (West scored 31 points in defeat, while Baylor added 25.)
- The ABA came to the arena on October 13, 1968, when the Oakland Oaks defeated the L.A. Stars in an exhibition, 156-116. Rick Barry scored 46 points in the game, shooting 15 of 28 from the floor and 16 of 17 from the foul line.
- In October 1995, the athletics center was the site of the 1995-96 Golden State Warriors training camp. Chris Mullin, Latrell Sprewell, B.J. Armstrong and No. 1 overall draft pick Joe Smith put on a show during an open practice to the public drawing a standing-room-only crowd of over 3,500.
- Then in 1997, the Sacramento Kings, highlighted by an appearance by Corliss Williamson, conducted their one-week camp at Cal Poly. Like the Warriors, the Kings opened doors to the public for an intrasquad scrimmage to conclude camp.

=== National Team exhibitions ===
- On September 22, 1982, the arena hosted an exhibition volleyball match between Cal Poly and the Chinese Women's Junior National Team, with China winning 15-4, 15-8, 15-8 in front of a crowd of 1,723 fans.
- On June 6, 1988, the gym hosted an exhibition match between the U.S. Olympic women's volleyball team and the East German team, as a sellout crowd watched the Americans rally for a five-set win, 10-15, 15-10, 12-15, 16-14, 15-9.
- The Denmark Women's National Basketball Team came to the gym on November 12, 1996, defeating Cal Poly in an exhibition, 82-70.

=== MMA events ===
- On May 22, 2010, the building hosted San Luis Obispo's first mixed martial arts card, with approximately 1,500 fans attending, including Stephen Neal, Lou Ferrigno and Urijah Faber. Seven professional fights were featured, generating roughly $20,000 as a fundraiser for the Cal Poly wrestling program.

=== Concerts ===
Musicians including Miles Davis, Eddie Money, The Pretenders, The Doors, Kenny Loggins, Cheap Trick, Rage Against the Machine and Public Enemy performed in the arena from the late 1960s to early 1990s, often to capacity crowds of 3,000.

=== Video game appearances ===
Mott Athletics Center (then referred to as Mott Gym) appeared in several collegiate basketball video games on PlayStation and Xbox consoles, including College Hoops 2K7, College Hoops 2K8 and the NCAA Basketball series, all of which featured Cal Poly men's basketball as a playable team.

== Tenants ==
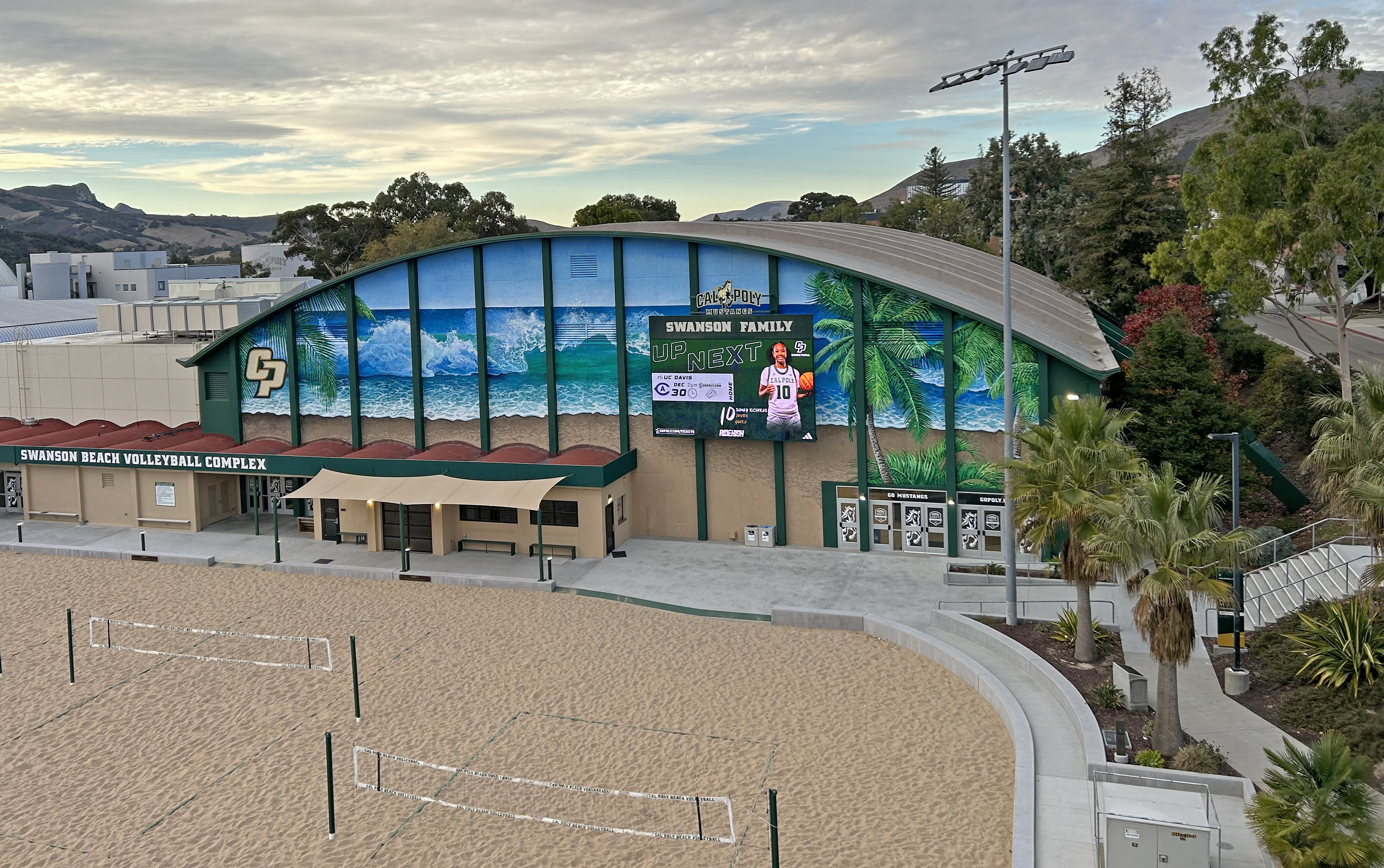
In the late fall of 2023, Cal Poly's Mott Athletics Center exterior was repainted adjacent to Swanson Beach Volleyball Complex.

Currently, the Cal Poly Mustangs men's basketball and Cal Poly Mustangs women's basketball teams, as well as the Cal Poly Mustangs women's volleyball and men's wrestling teams are the primary tenants of Mott Athletics Center.

From 2001 through 2003, the arena also hosted the annual Mission College Prep Christmas Classic Basketball Tournament.

Mott Athletics Center also contains the Cal Poly Mustangs trophy case, as well as the Mustang Hall of Fame.

For the Cal Poly student-athletes, men's and women's locker rooms were renovated in 1999, and the athletics center also houses the Mustang Strength Complex, the Cal Poly Athletics Academic Resource Center and offices for Cal Poly coaches.

== Gallery ==
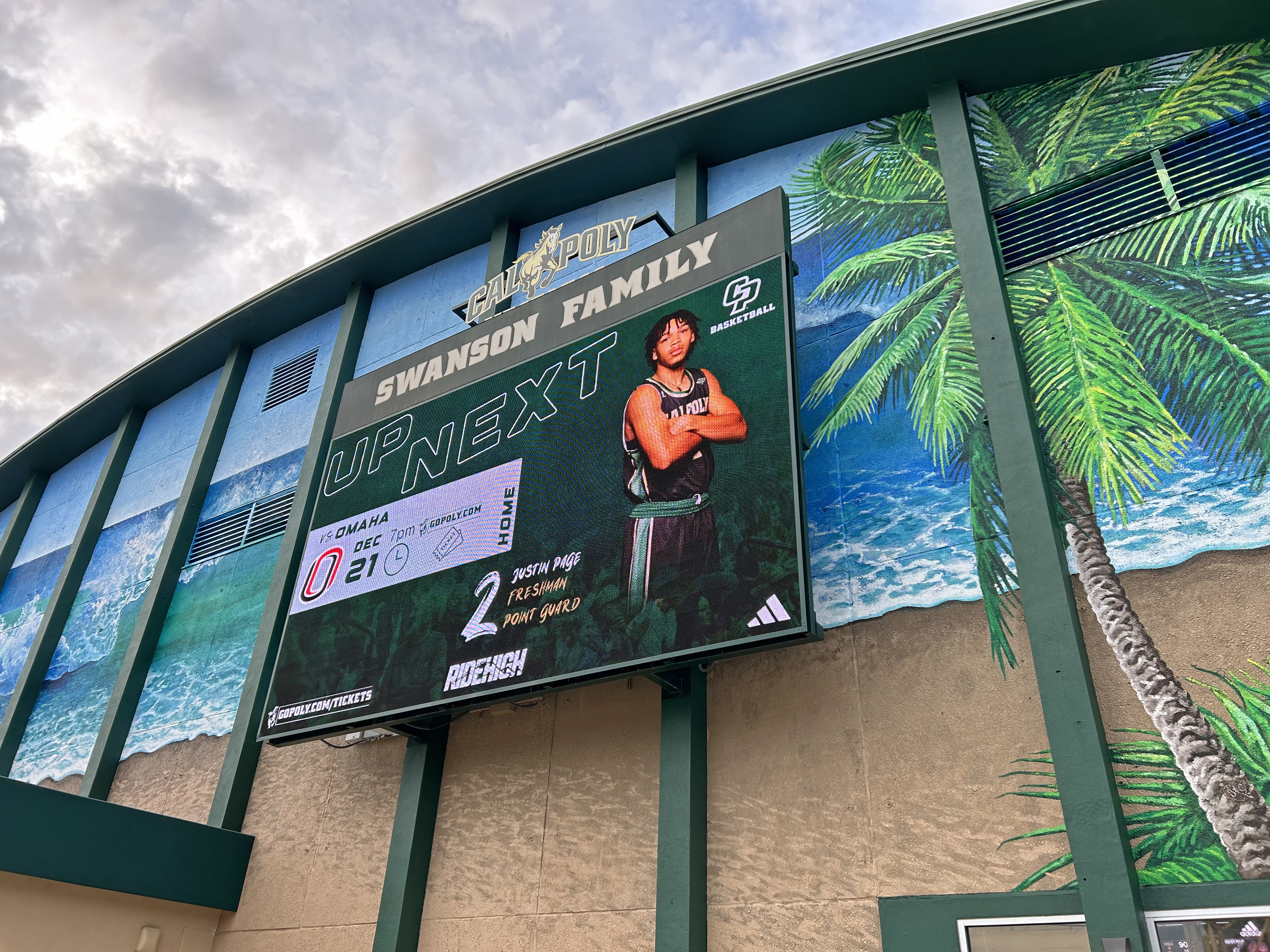
The Swanson Beach Volleyball Complex, home to Cal Poly's women's beach volleyball squad, borders Mott Athletics Center.

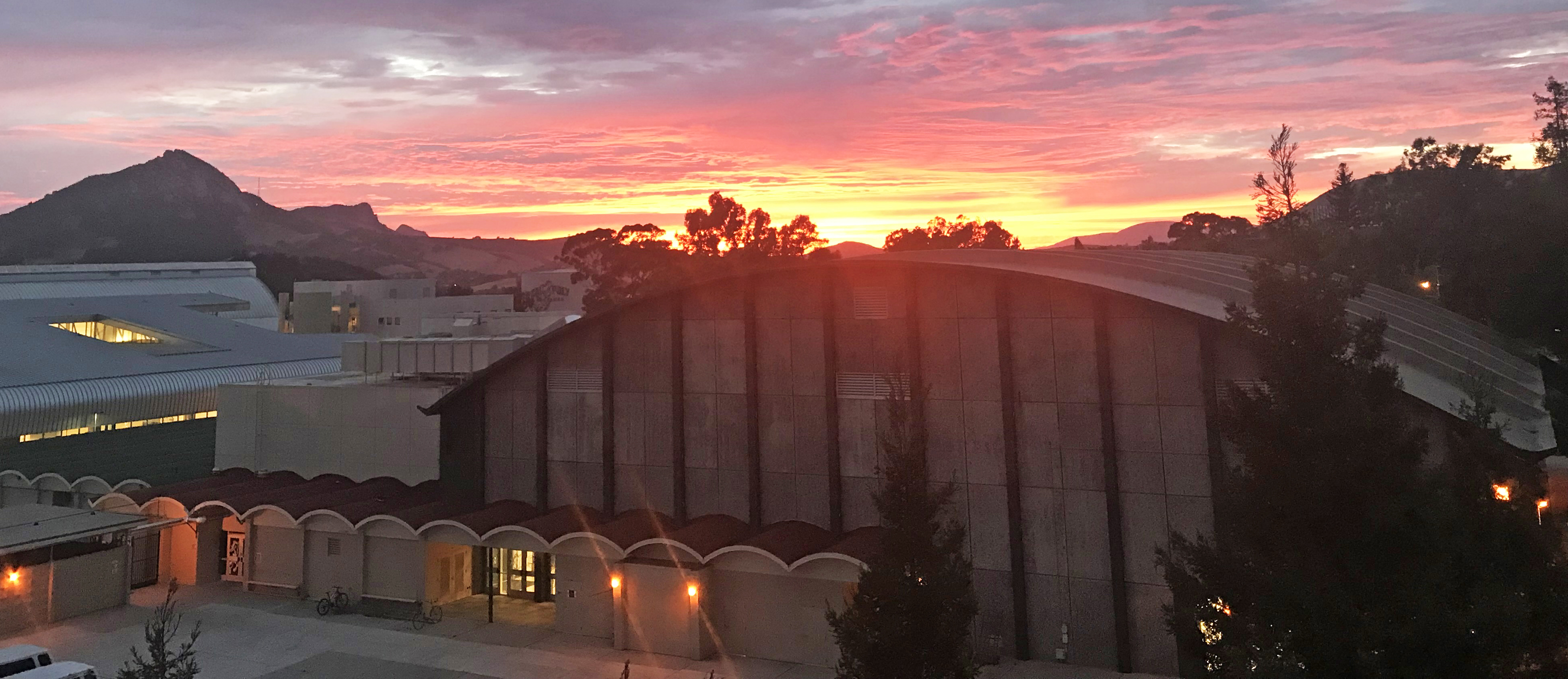
The southmost exterior of San Luis Obispo's 3,032-seat Mott Athletics Center is shown in July 2018 on the Cal Poly campus.

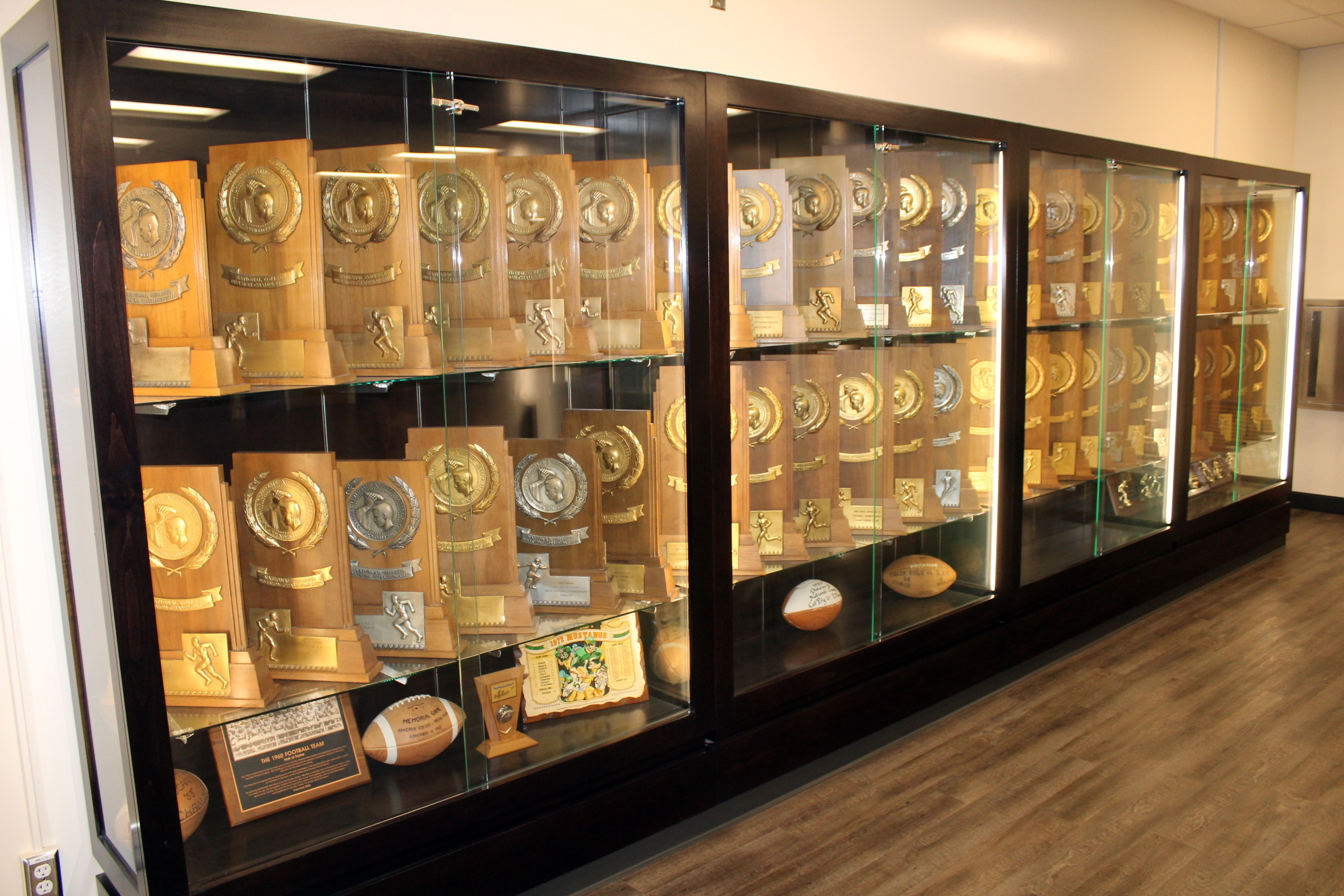
The NCAA and various conference trophy case collection in Mott Athletics Center.

== See also ==
- List of NCAA Division I basketball arenas
- California Polytechnic State University
- Cal Poly Mustangs
