= Joshua Smith (basketball) =

American basketball player (born 1992)

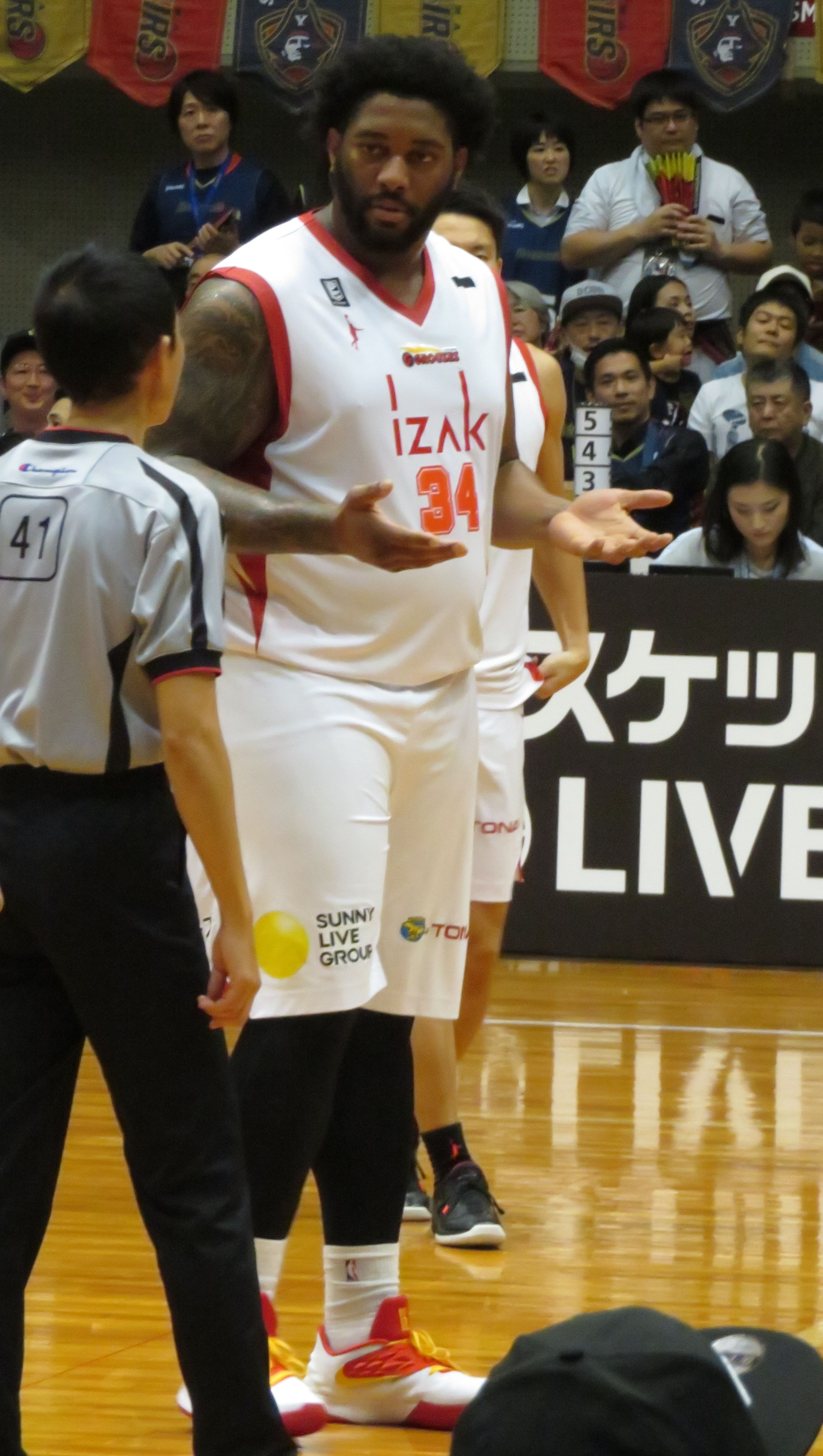
- Smith with Toyama Grouses in 2018

No. 8 – Rizing Zephyr Fukuoka
- Position: Center
- League: B. League

Personal information
- Born: May 14, 1992 (age 34) Seattle, Washington, U.S.
- Listed height: 6 ft 10 in (2.08 m)
- Listed weight: 290 lb (132 kg)

Career information
- High school: Kentwood (Covington, Washington)
- College: UCLA (2010–2012); Georgetown (2013–2015)
- NBA draft: 2015: undrafted
- Playing career: 2015–present

Career history
- 2015–2017: Rio Grande Valley Vipers
- 2017: TNT KaTropa
- 2017–2018: Kyoto Hannaryz
- 2018: TNT KaTropa
- 2018–2023: Toyama Grouses
- 2023–2024: Nagoya Diamond Dolphins
- 2024–present: Rizing Zephyr Fukuoka

Career highlights
- Pac-10 All-Freshman team (2011); McDonald's All-American (2010); Second-team Parade All-American (2009)
- Stats at Basketball Reference

Joshua LaTrell Smith (born May 14, 1992) is an American professional basketball player for the Rizing Zephyr Fukuoka of the Japanese B.League. He began his college basketball career with the UCLA Bruins before transferring in the middle of his third season, finishing his career with the Georgetown Hoyas.

Smith was a highly regarded center playing basketball in high school in Washington. He led his team to a state title, and he received multiple individual honors, including Associated Press' state player of the year. He attended college at University of California, Los Angeles (UCLA), where he was one of the top freshman players in the Pac-10 Conference. He struggled with his weight at UCLA, and he quit the team in the middle of his junior year. He transferred to Georgetown, where he played two seasons. After college, he played two seasons in the NBA Development League (known now as the NBA G League) before playing overseas in the Philippines and Japan.

== Early life ==
Smith was born in Seattle and grew up in Kent, Washington. He was already 5-foot (1.5 m) tall at age five. In the eighth grade, he wrote a report on UCLA Bruins basketball coach John Wooden, and afterwards became a fan of UCLA.

Smith learned to use his height and weight to his advantage while playing for his Amateur Athletic Union (AAU) team, the Seattle Rotary, and then at Kentwood High School. He was 6 feet 7 inches (2.01 m) in his freshman year, and grew 1.5 inches (3.8 cm) each year until he stood 6 feet 10 inches (2.08 m) by the end of his junior season. As a senior, he averaged 23.2 points, 15 rebounds and four assists, and led Kentwood to Washington's Class 4A title. He was named Washington's player of the year by Associated Press and earned McDonald's All-American honors and selection into the Jordan Brand Classic.

He was ranked by ESPN RISE as the No. 1 center recruit in the nation; Rivals.com ranked him at No. 3, and Scout.com ranked him as No. 4. Smith considered staying home and attending the nearby University of Washington, but he said he "couldn't pass up the opportunity" to attend the University of California, Los Angeles (UCLA).

== College career ==
=== UCLA ===
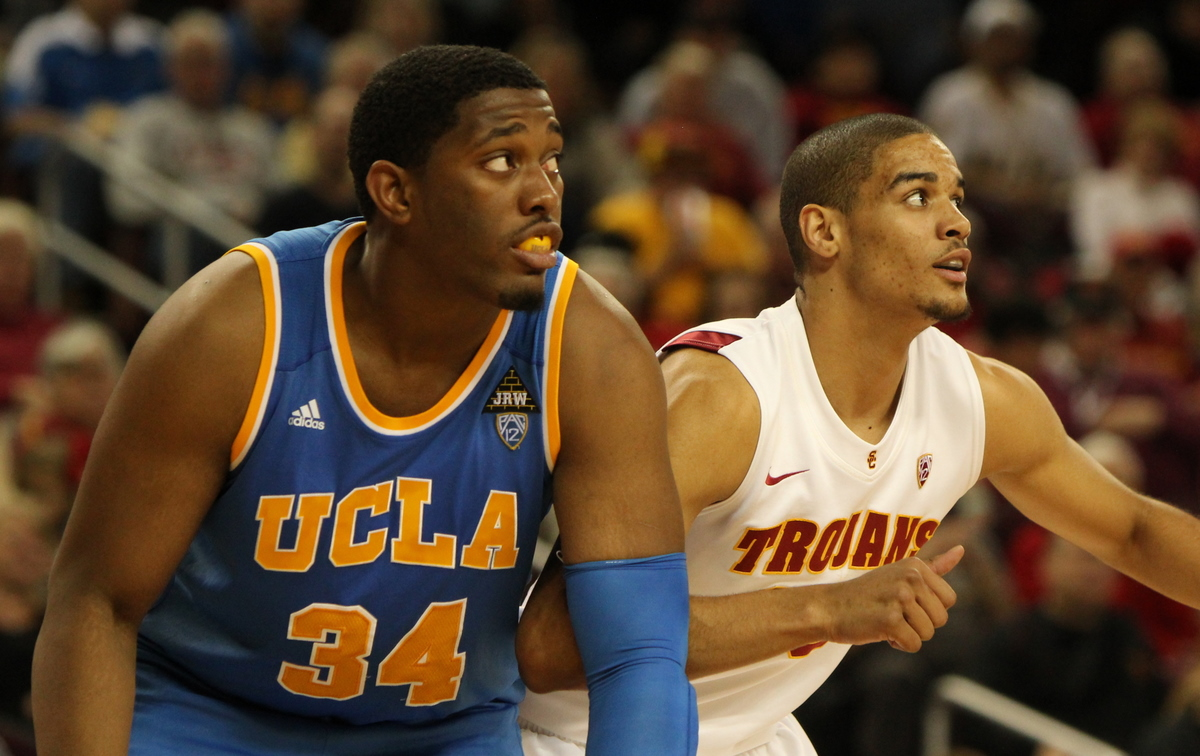
Smith against USC in 2012

At Smith's first practice with UCLA, coach Ben Howland expressed excitement over Smith's length and size. "When he is planted on the block, you're not moving him," he said. However, Howland was concerned about Smith's mobility, as he weighed 305 pounds (138 kg) after losing 50 pounds (23 kg) over the summer. Smith provided UCLA an inside game they had lacked in recent years. He played in 33 games in 2010–11, starting in 15, and averaged 10.9 points and 6.3 rebounds in 21.7 minutes. He was named to the Pac-10 Conference's All-Freshman team, and showed tremendous potential. However, he had foul trouble and struggled with his conditioning. After starting 13 of his first 15 games, he came off the bench in the next 16 to avoid fouling out. He became a dominant presence late in the season as the Bruins advanced to the third round of the 2011 NCAA tournament. In his last four games, including starts in both tournament games, Smith averaged 13 points and 27 minutes a game. UCLA was eliminated 73–65 by the Florida Gators. Afterwards, a fatigued Smith said, "I let my team down today." Howland thought Smith had a future playing professionally in the National Basketball Association (NBA), "provided he does certain things." The coach believed Smith would work on improving his conditioning.

Entering his sophomore year, Smith was generally considered a favorite to be named All-Pac-10. However, he did not do much to improve his game in the offseason, and he began 2011–12 at roughly the same size if not larger; his conditioning affected his production. His playing time declined, and his fouls per 40 minutes went from a suspect 5.8 as a freshman to an awful 7.3. Smith's average that season fell to 9.9 points and 4.9 rebounds in 17.2 minutes a game. As his fitness level deteriorated, he was not able to play for extended periods of time, and was instead rotated in for two- or three-minute stints. Smith played a total of just 17 minutes in two Pac-10 tournament games. In spite of his fitness and focus issues, some coaches in the Pac-12 (the Pac-10 had expanded by then) considered him the conference's top NBA prospect.

He showed improved discipline entering his junior season, having lost 15 pounds (6.8 kg) since the end of the previous season. His goal was to play 25 to 30 minutes a game. Citing "personal reasons", Smith quit UCLA after six games of their 2012–13 season. He averaged 5.2 points and 4.2 rebounds in 13.5 minutes, as his production dropped after each season at UCLA. He was the 11th player to leave the UCLA program since 2008; in early 2012, Sports Illustrated reported a lack of discipline at UCLA under Howland.

=== Georgetown ===
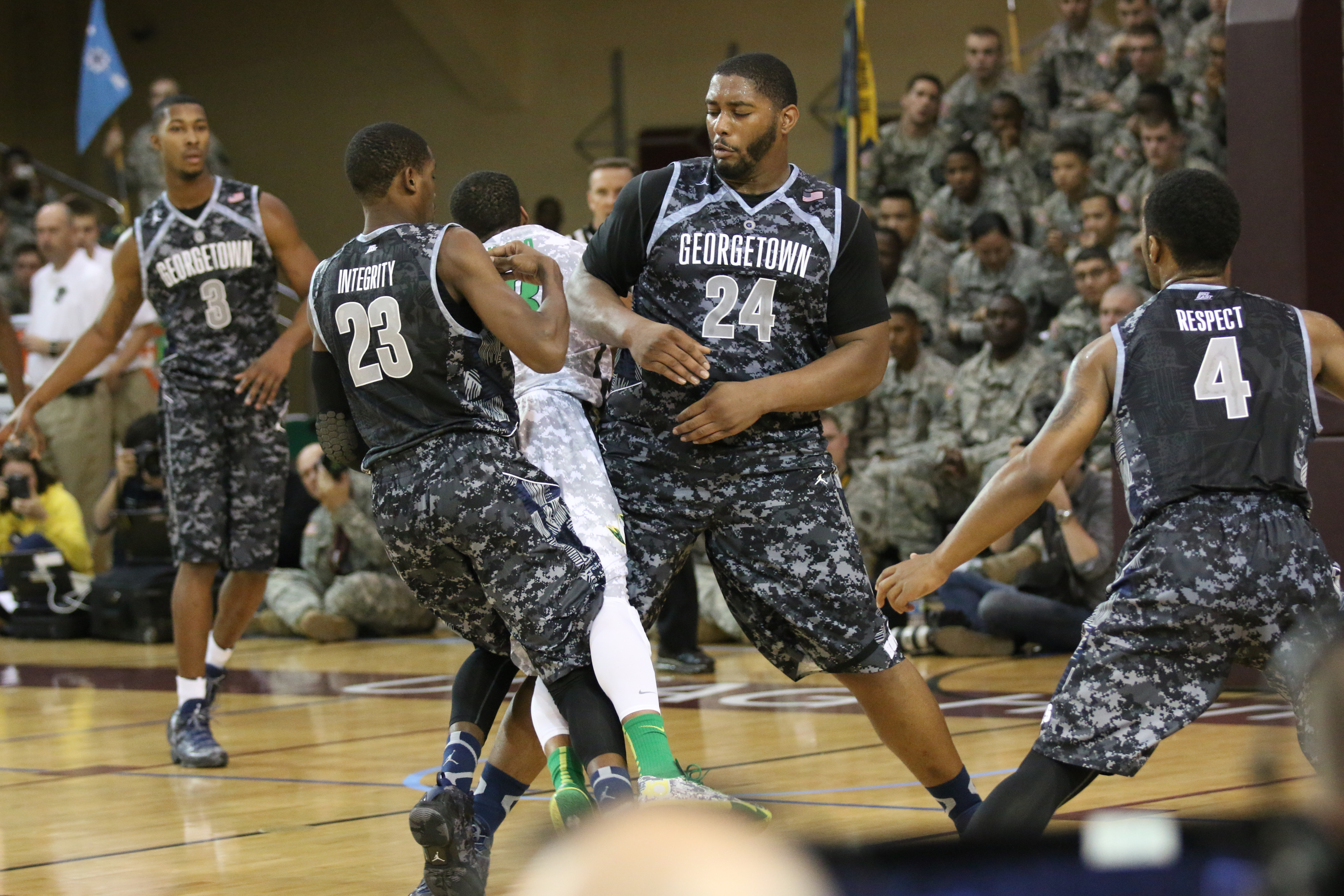
Smith playing for Georgetown in the 2013 Armed Forces Classic.

Smith transferred to Georgetown University, enrolling in January 2013. He practiced with the Hoyas basketball team, but was not allowed to play due to National Collegiate Athletic Association (NCAA) transfer rules. He was granted eligibility by the NCAA to play in 2013–14. Listed at 350 pounds (160 kg), he labored up and down the court, and was limited to playing a few minutes at a time. After playing in the Hoyas first two conference games, Smith missed the remaining 20 games of the season after January 4, 2014, due to academic ineligibility. At the time of his last game, the Hoyas were 10–3, and Smith was averaging 11.5 points but only 3.4 rebounds in 20 minutes. The team was 8–12 in his absence, finishing the season 18–15.

Smith regained his eligibility prior to the 2014–15 season. He bounced back nicely, and was named one of 15 candidates for the inaugural Kareem Abdul-Jabbar Award, given to the top center in college basketball. He finished the season ranked second on the team in scoring (10.8) and rebounding (5.8), and was invited to the Portsmouth Invitational Tournament.

== Professional career ==
=== NBA D-League ===
After going undrafted in the 2015 NBA draft, Smith played with the Miami Heat in the 2015 NBA Summer League. On September 21, 2015, he signed with the Houston Rockets. After appearing in seven preseason games, he was waived on October 24 in the Rockets' final round of cuts before the regular season.

On November 2, 2015, Smith was acquired by the Rio Grande Valley Vipers of the NBA Development League as an affiliate player of the Rockets. As a rookie in 2015–16, he averaged 8.9 points, 4.7 rebounds and 1.2 assists in 45 games for the Vipers. As the season progressed, Smith's weight increased and his playing time fell, and he was nearly cut by the Vipers.

During the 2016 offseason, Smith dropped 56 pounds (25 kg) to 327 pounds (148 kg) after working out with a new trainer in preparation for the Las Vegas Summer League. In July 2016, he joined the Milwaukee Bucks summer league team. On October 31, 2016, he was reacquired by the Rio Grande Valley Vipers.

=== Overseas ===
On May 17, 2017, Smith signed with TNT KaTropa of the Philippine Basketball Association (PBA).

On August 21, 2017, Smith signed with Kyoto Hannaryz of the B.League.

In May 2018, Smith returned to TNT KaTropa to replace Jeremy Tyler.

On July 27, 2018, Smith signed with Toyama Grouses of the B.League. On June 19, 2019, Smith re-signed with Toyama Grouses. On July 15, 2020, Smith re-signed with Toyama Grouses. On June 18, 2021, Smith re-signed with Toyama Grouses. On May 23, 2022, Smith re-signed with Toyama Grouses.

On September 17, 2023, Smith signed with Nagoya Diamond Dolphins of the B.League. On June 18, 2024, Smith signed with Rizing Zephyr Fukuoka of the B.League.

== Career statistics ==
=== Professional ===
Legend
GP	Games played	MPG	Minutes per game	FG%	Field goal percentage
3P%	3-point field goal percentage	FT%	Free throw percentage	RPG	Rebounds per game
APG	Assists per game	SPG	Steals per game	BPG	Blocks per game
PPG	Points per game	**Bold**	Career high		Led the league

Year	Team	League	GP	MPG	FG%	3P%	FT%	RPG	APG	SPG	BPG	PPG
2015–16	Rio Grande Valley Vipers	NBA D-League	45	16.5	.615	.000	.660	4.7	1.2	.6	.6	8.9
2016–17	TNT Katropa	PBA	15	24.4	.580	.000	.535	11.2	2.6	.9	1.0	19.1
2017–18	Kyoto Hannaryz	B.League	58	23.6	.650	.000	.631	9.4	2.1	.4	.6	16.8
2018	TNT Katropa	PBA	8	30.6	**.711**	.000	.618	**11.4**	**2.8**	1.0	**1.1**	17.8
2018–19	Toyama Grouses	B.League	**62**	**31.6**	.656	.000	**.672**	10.7	2.7	**1.1**	.6	**19.7**
Career		All Leagues	188	24.9	.642	.000	.637	8.9	2.2	.8	.6	16.1

=== College ===
Year	Team	GP	GS	MPG	FG%	3P%	FT%	RPG	APG	SPG	BPG	PPG
2010–11	UCLA	33	15	21.7	.555	—	.613	6.3	.6	.8	1.0	10.9
2011–12	UCLA	32	9	17.2	.574	—	.590	4.9	.4	.6	.7	9.9
2012–13	UCLA	6	0	13.5	.611	—	.474	4.2	.3	1.2	.5	5.2
2013–14	Georgetown	13	13	19.9	.655	.000	.635	3.4	.7	1.0	.6	11.5
2014–15	Georgetown	33	32	20.5	.621	—	.646	5.8	1.2	1.0	.7	10.8
Career		117	69	19.5	.591	.000	.613	5.3	.7	.8	.8	10.4
