= 2013–14 Georgetown Hoyas men's basketball team =

American college basketball season

2013–14 Georgetown Hoyas men's basketball

NIT, second round
- Conference: Big East
- Record: 18–15 (8–10 Big East)
- Head coach: John Thompson III (10th season)
- Assistant coaches: Kevin Broadus (5th season); Tavaras Hardy (1st season); Kevin Sutton (1st season)
- Captains: Nate Lubick; Markel Starks
- Home arena: Verizon Center; McDonough Gymnasium

2013–14 Big East men's basketball standings
	Conf.				Overall
Team	W		L	PCT	W		L	PCT
No. 6 Villanova	16	–	2	.889	29	–	5	.853
No. 16 Creighton	14	–	4	.778	27	–	8	.771
Providence †	10	–	8	.556	23	–	12	.657
Xavier	10	–	8	.556	21	–	13	.618
St. John's	10	–	8	.556	20	–	13	.606
Marquette	9	–	9	.500	17	–	15	.531
Georgetown	8	–	10	.444	18	–	15	.545
Seton Hall	6	–	12	.333	17	–	17	.500
Butler	4	–	14	.222	14	–	17	.452
DePaul	3	–	15	.167	12	–	21	.364
† 2014 Big East tournament winner Rankings from AP poll Source:

The 2013–14 Georgetown Hoyas men's basketball team represented Georgetown University in the 2013–14 NCAA Division I men's basketball season. They were led by John Thompson III, were members of the Big East Conference, and played their home games at the Verizon Center, with one home game at McDonough Gymnasium. The team started the season against the Oregon Ducks in the Armed Forces Classic at Camp Humphreys near Pyeongtaek, South Korea, and played in the 2013 Puerto Rico Tip-Off.

This was Georgetown's first season as a member of the newly organized Big East Conference. It had been a founding member of the original Big East Conference in the 1979-80 season and had remained a member for 34 seasons. However, that conference's increasingly unstable membership and uncertain future and what Georgetown and the conference's other basketball-only members believed to be its focus on college football at the expense of the interests of its basketball programs led Georgetown and six other Big East members (DePaul, Marquette, Providence, Seton Hall, St. John's, and Villanova) to leave the conference after the conclusion of the 2012–13 season. In 2013 they joined Butler, Creighton, and Xavier in forming a new Big East Conference. (The original Big East Conference then added new members of its own and renamed itself the American Athletic Conference for the 2013–14 season.) One immediate effect of the conference realignment was that for the first time since the 1977-78 season the Hoyas did not play Syracuse, Georgetown's great rival throughout the original Big East Conference's 34-season history; Syracuse had itself left the original Big East in 2013 to join the Atlantic Coast Conference for the 2013–14 season.

== Season recap ==
Following the previous season, Georgetown sophomore forward Otto Porter Jr. had left the team for a career in the National Basketball Association after two impressive collegiate years in which he had led the team in virtually all statistical categories, and the Hoyas keenly felt his loss. Without any seniors on the team the previous year, however, Georgetown had lost no players to graduation over the offseason, and the only player to transfer from Georgetown, then-freshman center Brandon Bolden, had had virtually no playing time during his only season as a Hoya. Georgetown returned the rest of its veteran players, with senior Markel Starks at point guard; sophomore D'Vauntes Smith-Rivera at shooting guard; junior Jabril Trawick at guard; senior Nate Lubick, redshirt senior Aaron Bowen, junior Mikael Hopkins, and sophomore Stephen Domingo at forward; and senior Moses Ayegba and sophomore Bradley Hayes at center. Sophomore guard David Allen made the team as a walk-on for the second straight season, sophomore guard Riyan Williams – the son of former Georgetown great Reggie Williams – also walked on and was added to the roster in January 2014, the third time in Georgetown men's basketball history that the son of a former Georgetown player made the team. Senior guard John Caprio, a walk-on in his first three seasons, made the team as a scholarship player for the first and only time. Junior forward Greg Whittington, who had been Georgetown's second-leading scorer and rebounder of the 2012–13 season before he was suspended for academic reasons at midseason and missed the last 19 games of the year, also returned, but he had undergone knee surgery over the offseason and began the 2013-14 campaign sidelined while he recovered. Junior center Tyler Adams, sidelined early in his freshman season by heart arrhythmia, spent the season on a medical hardship waiver that allowed him to continue at Georgetown on a scholarship without counting against the team's scholarship total; relegated to the bench for another year, he made the most of the situation, acting as a de facto assistant coach.

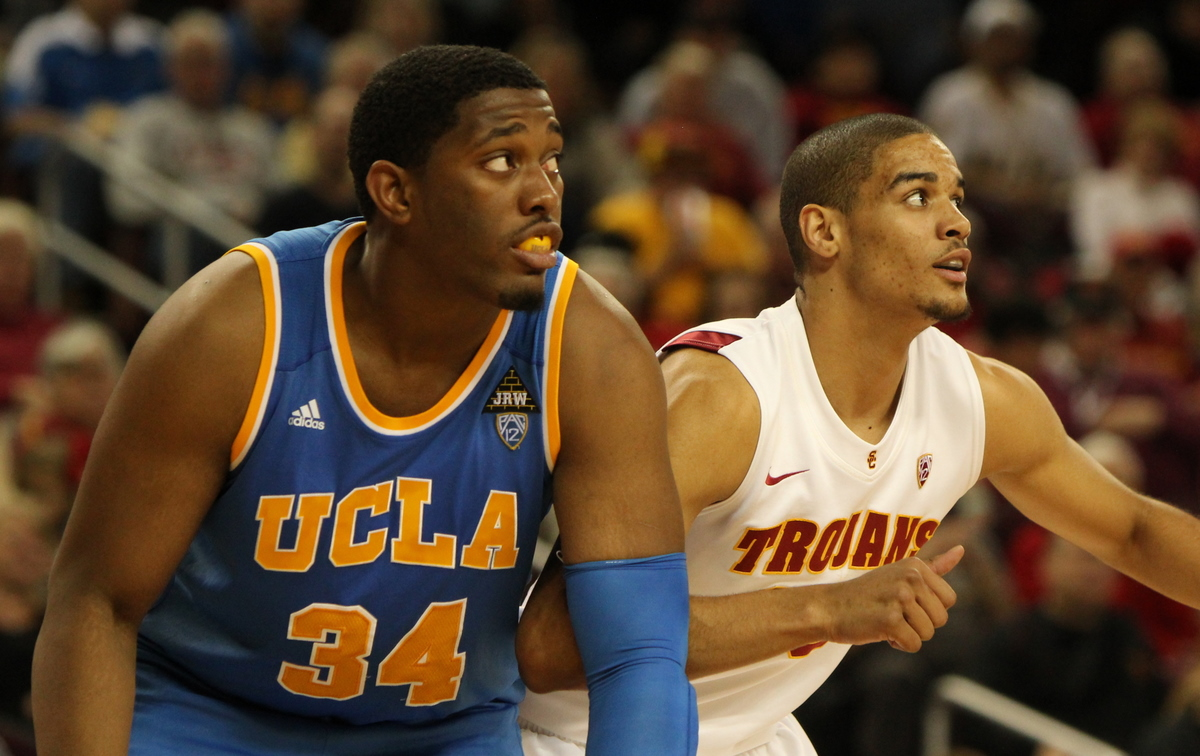
Joshua Smith (No. 23) with the UCLA Bruins in January 2012 during a game against the USC Trojans.

The Hoyas welcomed two new players for 2013–14. Power forward Reggie Cameron joined the team as its only freshman, but most attention centered around its only other newcomer, junior center Joshua Smith, who joined Georgetown as a transfer from UCLA. In his freshman year at UCLA in 2010–11, Smith averaged 10.9 points and 6.3 rebounds per game. By his sophomore season in 2011–12, however, he had lost the confidence of Bruins head coach Ben Howland, who believed the 6-foot-10 (208 cm) Smith to be overweight and out of shape – Smith arrived for his sophomore season weighing 350 pounds (159 kg) – and had criticized publicly what he saw as immature behavior on Smith's part; Howland did not give Smith much playing time during his sophomore season, as Smith tired easily and played for only two or three minutes at a time, and he averaged only 17.2 minutes per game for the year. After playing in only six games for the Bruins during his junior year in 2012–13, Smith left UCLA in midseason, transferring in January 2013 to Georgetown, where he began taking classes and practicing with the team during the spring 2013 semester. Normally, the National Collegiate Athletic Association (NCAA) would have required Smith to sit out two entire semesters before making his Hoya debut, and would have granted him only one more year of eligibility, but Georgetown requested a seasons-of-competition waiver from the NCAA, which the NCAA granted, in effect making a controversial decision to give Smith the same status as a redshirt junior and allow him to begin play for the Hoyas with the opening game of the 2013–14 season and with two years of eligibility remaining. Thompson, who had recruited Smith in high school, expected Smith and his low-post offensive presence to play a key role for the Hoyas and constructed a team that could take advantage of his presence. Thompson told the press that signing Smith was "a big risk – literally and figuratively" because of his declining performance during his time at UCLA and questions about his commitment to physical fitness and to playing winning basketball, but that the risk was worth it if Smith worked hard and stayed in shape because of his footwork, agility, and soft hands. Thompson noted that Smith had made a good start with the Hoyas, arriving for the fall 2013 semester in good physical shape.

=== Nonconference schedule ===
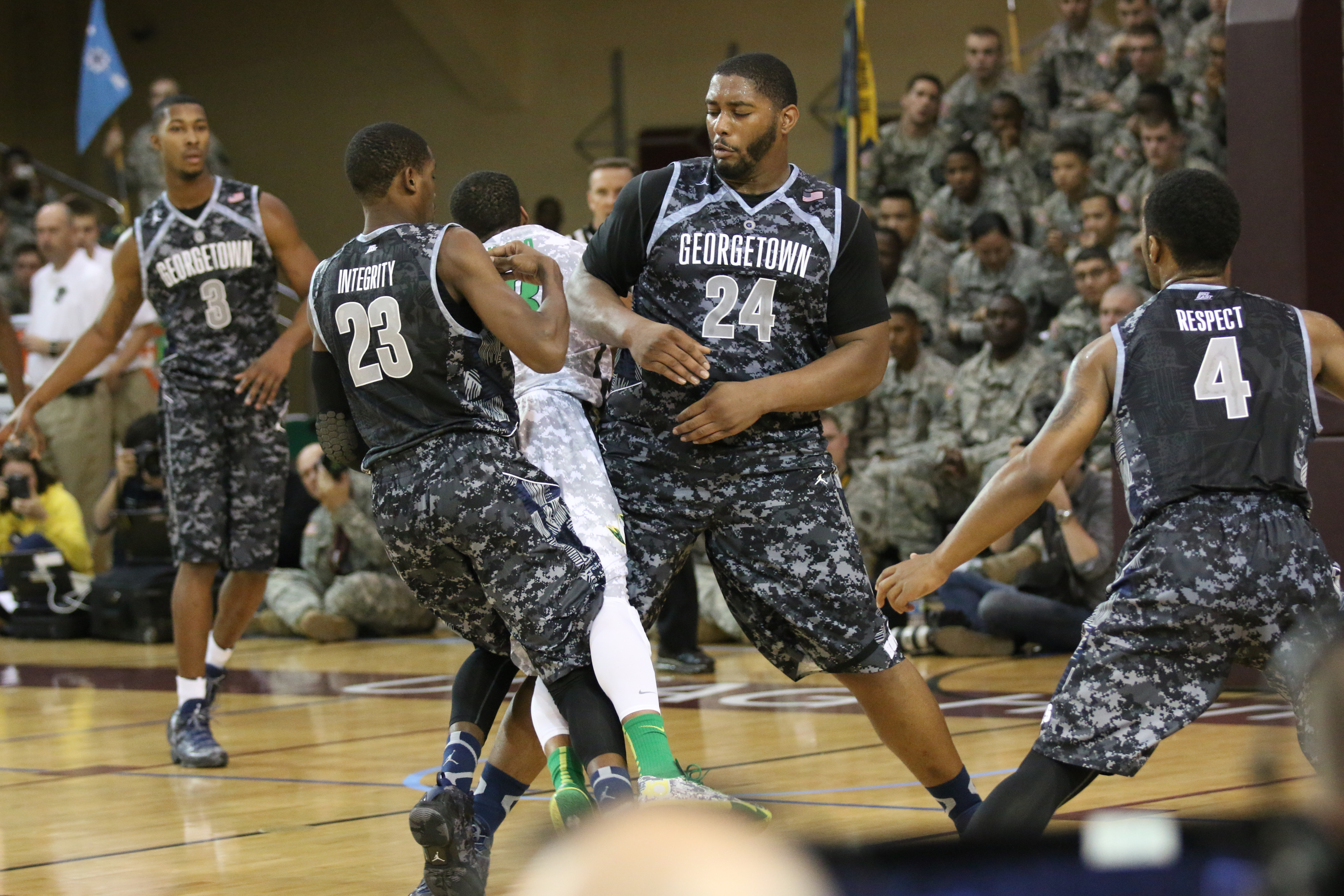
The Hoyas began the season with a game against the Oregon Ducks in the 2013 Armed Forces Classic at Camp Humphreys in South Korea. Above, Georgetown center Joshua Smith (No. 24) collides with Oregon small forward Elgin Cook during the game. Also visible are Georgetown forwards Mikael Hopkins (No. 3) and Aaron Bowen (No.23) and guard D'Vauntes Smith-Rivera (No. 4).

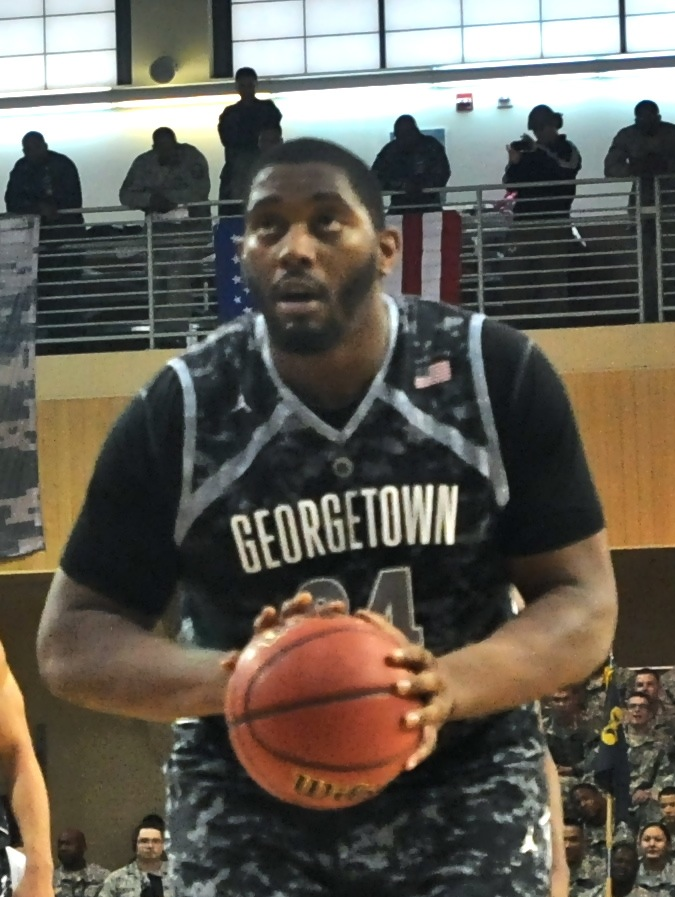
Joshua Smith at the free-throw line during the Armed Forces Classic at Camp Humphreys in South Korea.

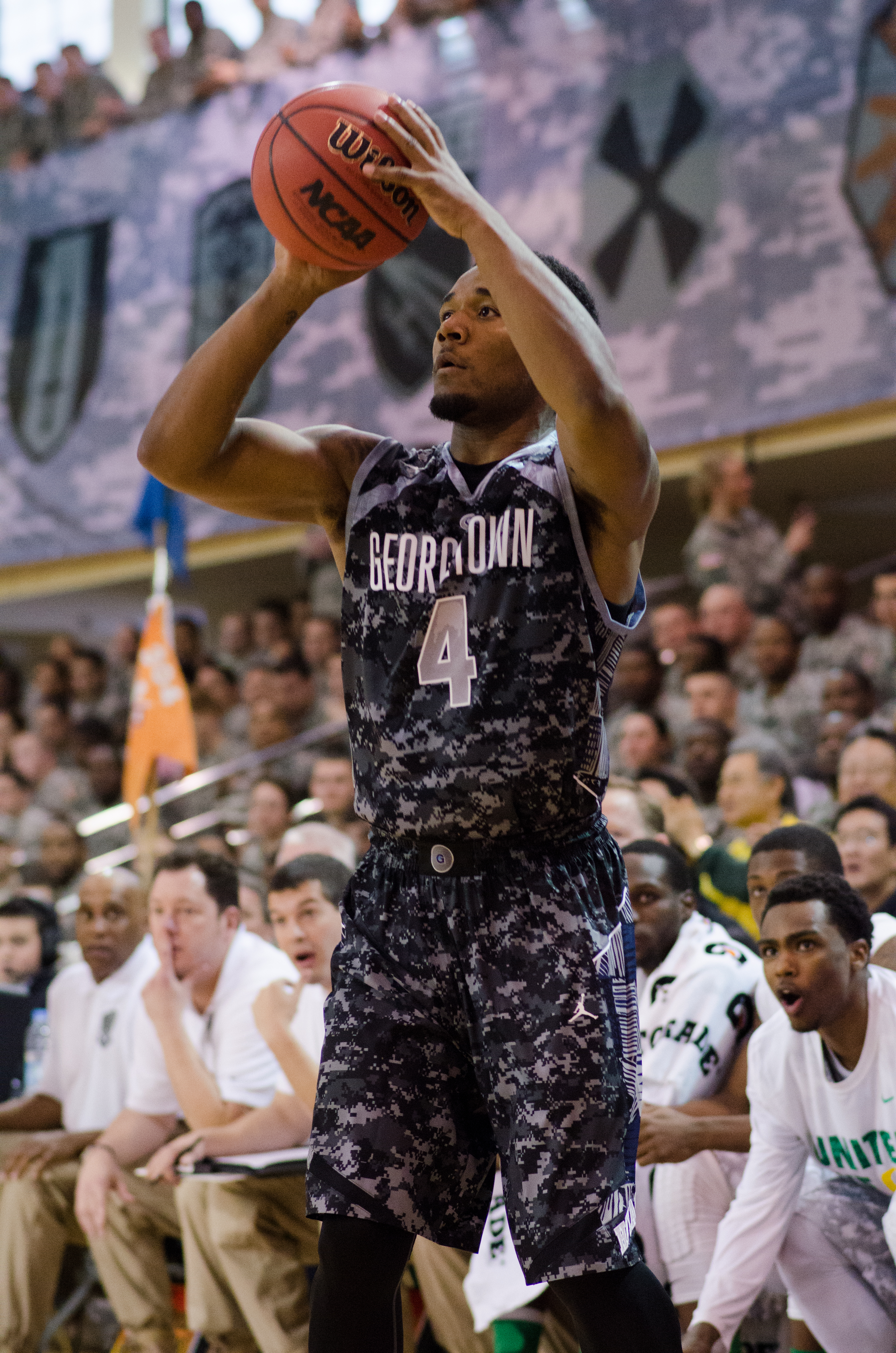
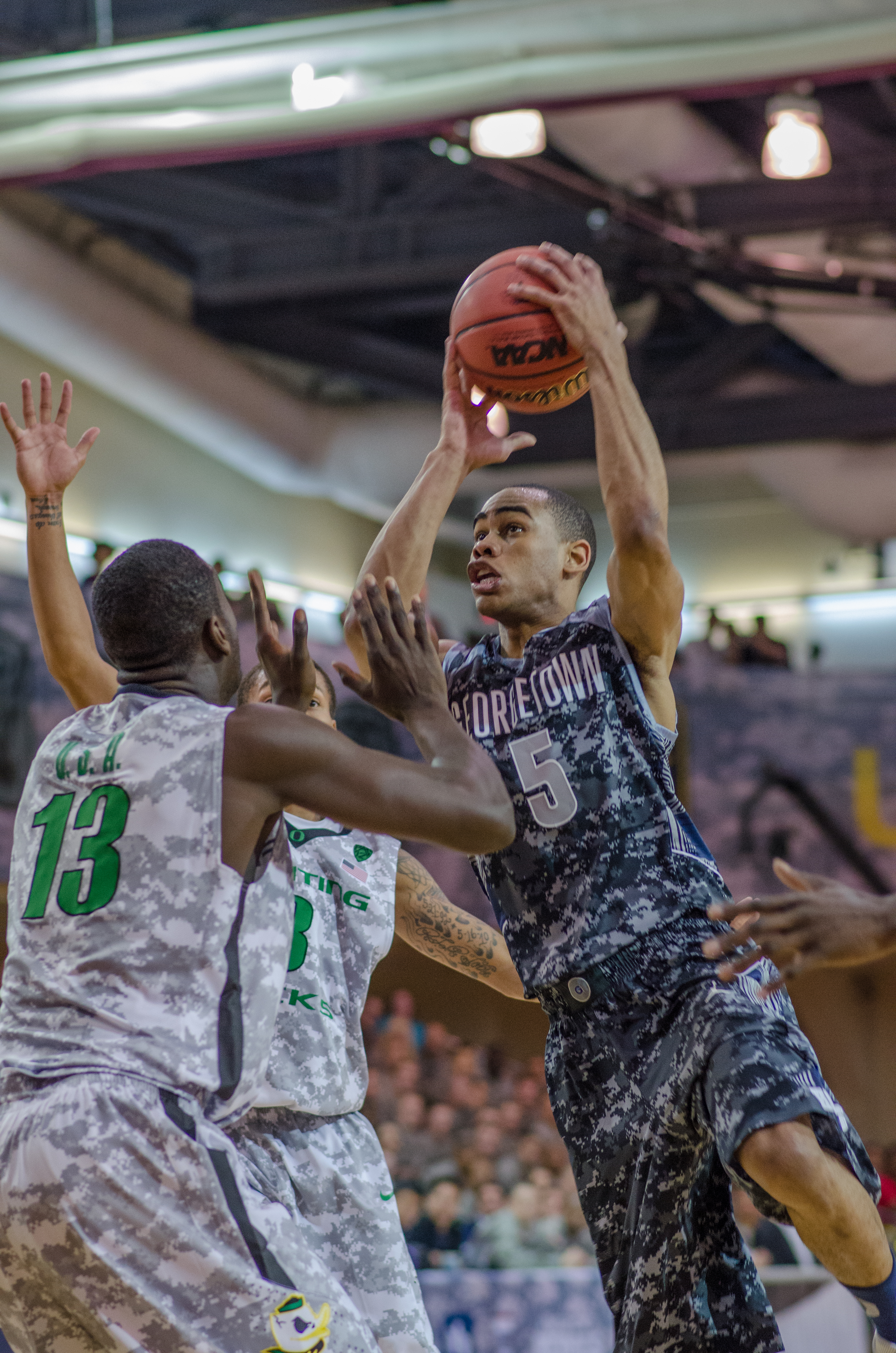
Georgetown guards D'Vauntes Smith-Rivera (left) and Markel Starks (right) in action against Oregon during the Armed Forces Classic at Camp Humphreys.

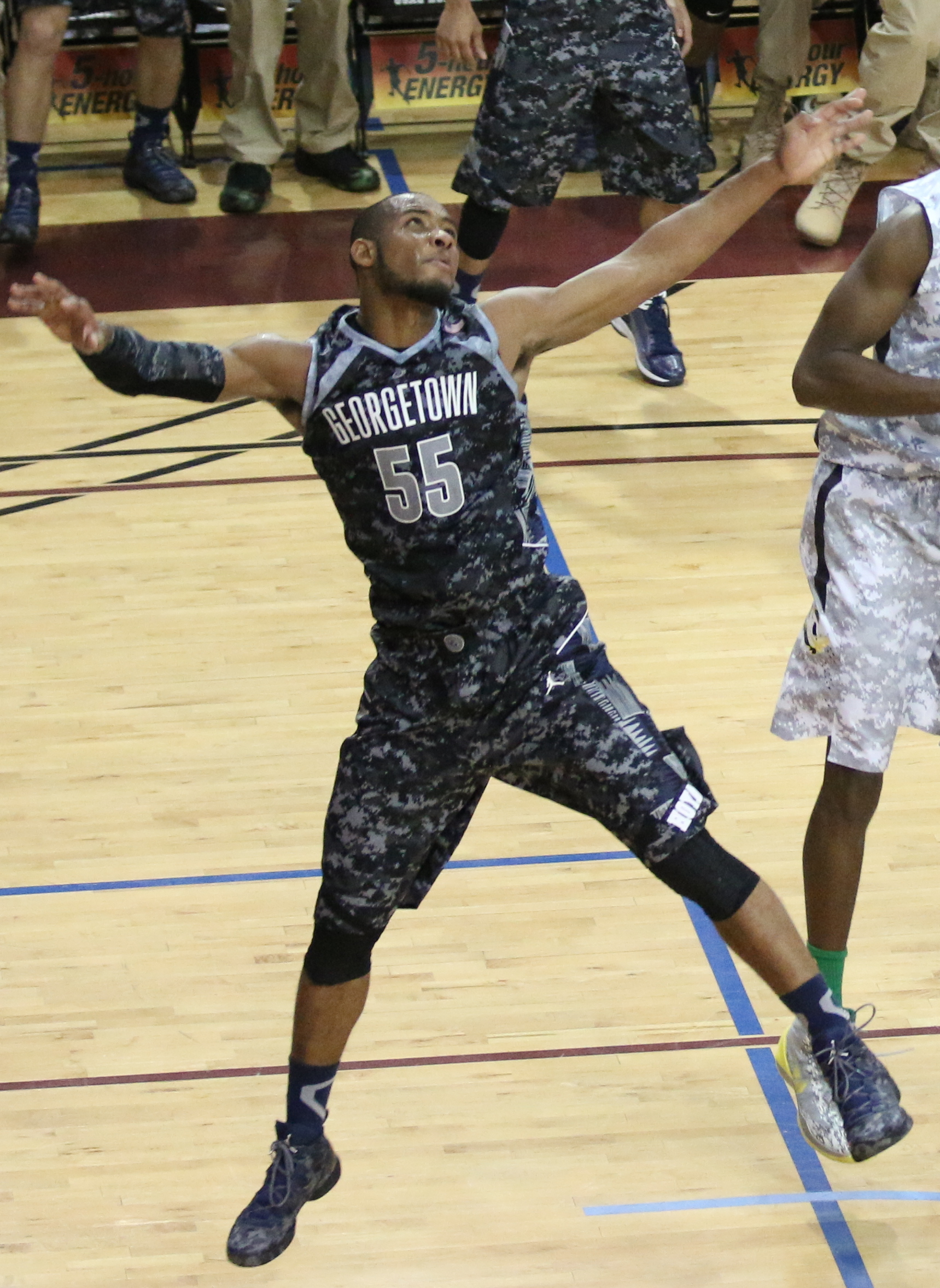
Georgetown guard Jabril Trawick plays against Oregon during the Armed Forces Classic at Camp Humphreys.

Unranked Georgetown began its season with a ranked opponent, No. 19 Oregon, in the Armed Forces Classic and in an unusual venue, Camp Humphreys, a United States Army base in South Korea located south of Seoul, with an audience consisting almost entirely of U.S. Army soldiers who cheered enthusiastically for both teams. Both teams wore special camouflage uniforms, the Ducks light-colored ones with "USA" on their backs instead of the players' names and the Hoyas dark-colored ones sporting inspiring words like "Courage," "Integrity," and "Respect" rather than players' names, and the coaches and staff of both teams wore combat boots and military-style cargo pants. Georgetown took its only lead of the first half by scoring the opening basket, but after that shot poorly and committed turnovers repeatedly, allowing Oregon to build a lead, although the Hoyas battled back to a 37–34 deficit at halftime behind 10 points by Mikael Hopkins and nine first-half points by Joshua Smith. The Hoyas briefly took their second and final lead of the game early in the second half, but Oregon soon pulled ahead for good, although Georgetown closed to within four points with a minute left in the game. Ultimately, the Hoyas missed important free throws and the Ducks made their free throws in the final minutes, and Oregon won 82–75. The Hoyas went only 1-for-15 (6.7 percent) from three-point range and Oregon outrebounded them 40–32. Joshua Smith scored a game-high 25 points – also his season high, as it turned out – but grabbed only four rebounds, Markel Starks made Georgetown's only three-pointer with 7:16 left in the game and finished with 16 points, Jabril Trawick had 11 points, and Mikael Hopkins contributed 10. Oregon's 82 points were more than any opponent had scored against Georgetown the previous season.

The Hoyas made a brief return to Washington, D.C., to defeat Wright State in their home opener at the Verizon Center, with D'Vauntes Smith-Rivera scoring 25 points and Starks contributing 23. Reggie Cameron scored on each of the first three three-point attempts of his collegiate career to finish with nine points as the Hoyas' three-point game recovered from its dismal showing in South Korea on 10-for-22 (45 percent) shooting from beyond the arc. Georgetown then went on the road again to take part in the Puerto Rico Tip-Off in San Juan, Puerto Rico. In the opening game of the tournament, Georgetown faced Northeastern – a team the Hoyas had faced only once before, in 1979 – and suffered an upset at the hands of the Huskies, leading by 11 points at the half but collapsing in the second half, shooting 23 percent from the field after halftime, struggling at the free-throw line throughout the game, and allowing Northeastern to come from behind for a 63–56 win. Relegated to the tournament's consolation bracket, the Hoyas had a much better outing against Kansas State the following day, shooting 63 percent from the field and leading by as many as 29 points before coming away with a 90–63 victory. D'Vauntes Smith-Rivera was the only Hoya to score in double figures against Northeastern with 14 points and scored a game-high 25 points against Kansas State, while Jabil Trawick had 16, Joshua Smith 13, and Markel Starks 11 points against the Wildcats.

Georgetown advanced to the tournament's fifth-place game to face its second ranked opponent of the season, No. 10 VCU, which had suffered an upset loss to Florida State in its tournament opener and defeated Long Beach State to advance to meet the Hoyas. In the most recent previous meeting between the schools, VCU had knocked Georgetown out of the 2011 NCAA tournament, outrunning and blowing out the Hoyas. This time, Georgetown scored the game's first eight points in a fast-paced first half, but VCU used a pressure defense to force Georgetown into 14 first-half turnovers, scoring 15 points off them. The Rams also made the most of a big advantage in first-half free throw opportunities, going 14-for-15 (93 percent) from the line compared to Georgetown's 2-for-3. Despite this, the Hoyas handled the Rams' pressure well, and there were five lead changes in the first half, with VCU enjoying its biggest lead of the half at 26–20 but going into the locker room clinging to a 30–29 lead. In the second half, VCU had back-to-back takeaways as part of an 8–0 run to take a 48–41 lead with 14 minutes left in the game, but Georgetown came back to lead 67–60 with 4:20 remaining. Jabril Trawick fouled out on the next Georgetown possession, costing the Hoyas some of their quickness, but Georgetown held the lead at 69–63. Then VCU mounted a comeback, and Georgetown's lead shrank to 81–78 with 14.1 seconds left and 83–80 with 1.8 seconds to play, but the Hoyas finished the game with a free throw to come away with an 84–80 upset win and a fifth-place finish in the 2013 Puerto Rico Tip-Off. The game lasted nearly three hours, with 61 fouls called. The Hoyas outshot the Rams from the field 56 to 35 percent and went 6-for-11 (55 percent) from three-point range. Smith-Rivera scored a game-high 26 points and went 5-for-6 from the free-throw line, Markel Starks was 10-for-10 in free throws and scored 23 points, and Joshua Smith had 17 points.

After playing four of their first five games outside the continental United States, the Hoyas returned to the Verizon Center for a four-game homestand. A harbinger of roster problems that would plague Georgetown for much of the season came on the homestand's first day, when John Thompson III announced just before the tip-off on November 30 against Lipscomb – the first meeting of the schools – that junior forward Greg Whittington – who had not played since January 8, 2013, because of an academic suspension, missing the final 19 games of the 2012–13 season, and had suffered an injury over the summer of 2013 that required knee surgery and prevented him from playing at all during the 2013–2014 season – had been dismissed from the team for unspecified reasons. The Hoyas swept the homestand to extend their winning streak to six games. During the homestand, D'Vauntes Smith-Rivera had 17 points each against Lipscomb and High Point, and 19 against Elon, while Markel Starks scored 18 against High Point, 12 against Colgate, and 21 against Elon. Joshua Smith scored 14 each against Lipscomb and Colgate and contributed 11 against High Point and 18 in the Elon game. Mikael Hopkins came off the bench to score 13 against Lipscomb and to contribute nine points and eight rebounds in the Colgate game. Against Colgate, Nate Lubick scored in double figures for the first time in the season with 10 points, and he followed up with another 10 points against Elon. Against High Point, the Hoyas tied their season high with 10 three-pointers, but against Elon they allowed the Phoenix to go 8-for-17 in three-pointers, the first time all season they had allowed an opponent to attempt more than seven three-point shots. The Hoyas' victory over Colgate was their eighth in nine meetings between the schools, but the six-point win was so tight that an annoyed John Thompson III refused to let his players discuss it with the media, saying they had not earned the right to speak about the game.

Georgetown next went back on the road to face its third ranked opponent of the season, No. 18 Kansas, which had a 66-game winning streak on its home court against non-conference opponents. The Hoyas employed a zone defense to try to counter Kansas's athleticism and height, but had difficulty defending inside. In the first half, the Jayhawks put on a strong defensive effort that helped them go on a 14–3 run and the Hoyas at one point went 10 1/2 minutes without a field goal, missing five straight shots while committing a turnover and a shot clock violation. The Hoyas played a very physical game, but this backfired as Georgetown players got in foul trouble; by halftime, when Kansas led 44–34, Moses Ayegba and Nate Lubick each had three fouls and Joshua Smith was among three other Hoyas with two, and Smith quickly picked up a third foul at the beginning of the second half and had to spend long stretches on the bench for the remainder of the game. Kansas extended its lead to 56–38 with 12:57 left to play before Georgetown closed to a 59–47 deficit halfway through the second half on a Jabril Trawick basket that almost caused a fight between the teams when Trawick fouled Jayhawks small forward Andrew Wiggins hard. A 10–3 Jayhawks run followed that put Kansas ahead 69–50 with 7:10 to play. Georgetown never got within 18 points again as Kansas continued to build its lead. Joshua Smith, averaging 14.1 points per game, fouled out after scoring only five points and Moses Ayegba and Nate Lubick also fouled out before Kansas won the game 86–64, extending its home winning streak against non-conference opponents to 67. Markel Starks with 19 points and D'Vauntes Smith-Rivera with 12 were the only two Hoyas to score in double digits.

A week later, Georgetown rounded out the non-conference portion of its schedule with an easy home win over FIU, improving its all-time record against FIU to 4–0 and extending its winning streak at the Verizon Center against non-conference opponents to 49. D'Vauntes Smith-Rivera, Markel Starks, and Nate Lubick each scored 15 points against FIU, and Georgetown entered conference play three days later with a record of 8–3.

=== Conference schedule ===
Although Georgetown was a member of the Big East Conference, it was not the storied conference the Hoyas had joined as a charter member in 1979. The original Big East Conference still existed, but under a new name, as the American Athletic Conference – marketed as "the American" – and Georgetown this season was a charter member of an entirely new conference also named the Big East. Both the new Big East and the American claimed the history and heritage of the original Big East as their own, and the new Big East had many aspects that were reminiscent of the old Big East. Like the old conference in its early days, the new Big East was a basketball-only conference that played a regular-season schedule made up of each team hosting and visiting each other team once – something that had become impractical in the old conference as it expanded in the interest of college football programs – and it also maintained the old Big East's tradition of holding its conference championship tournament, the Big East tournament, at Madison Square Garden in New York City. The new conference also included traditional Georgetown foes; among schools that had transferred from the old conference to the new one were three other charter members of the original conference (Providence, St. John's, and Seton Hall) and a second-season addition to the old Big East (Villanova), as well as two schools that had joined the old Big East more recently (DePaul and Marquette). However, other aspects of the new conference were quite different from the old one. Three of its members (Butler, Creighton, and Xavier) had no association at all with the original Big East, and two of them were among the better teams in the conference in its first year, while Georgetown-St. John's meetings lacked the national notability they had enjoyed in the old conference's heyday. Moreover, Georgetown would no longer face traditional foes such as Connecticut – a charter member of the original Big East which remained in the American, not on Georgetown's schedule for the first time since the 1979-80 season – and Pittsburgh – a fourth-season addition to the old conference which had joined the Atlantic Coast Conference (ACC) and was not on Georgetown's schedule for the first time since the 1981-82 season. Most notably, archrival Syracuse (which also had joined the ACC) was no longer on Georgetown's schedule, missing from it for the first time since the 1978-79 season. Both the new Big East and Georgetown felt the absence of Syracuse particularly keenly because of the role the Georgetown-Syracuse rivalry had played in the original Big East throughout its 34-season history. As the new Big East began play, media observers opined that the new conference was weaker on the court than the old one and lacked the luster of its predecessor and would have to build new rivalries and a new history of its own if it was to prevail in the sports marketplace.

The new Big East Conference began play with a full slate of five games on December 31, 2013, and Georgetown – picked pre-season by the conference's coaches to finish second in the Big East – started its first season in the new conference at the Verizon Center with its 13th straight win over DePaul, a game in which Markel Starks had a game-high 21-point performance and D'Vauntes Smith-Rivera scored 12. The Hoyas followed that with their 100th game against St. John's, beating the Red Storm easily for the sixth time in a row and preserving a home winning streak against St. John's that dated back to January 18, 2003. The Hoyas improved their record in the all-time series with St. John's – which began in the 1909-1910 season – to 47–53 as D'Vauntes Smith-Rivera scored 31 points, shooting 9-for-12 (75 percent) from the field overall and 6-for-7 (86 percent) from three-point range, and Markel Starks contributed 12 points.

Joshua Smith had scored 25 points against Oregon, 17 points against VCU, and 11 or more points in six straight games and in double figures in seven games to start the season, but his performance then began to decline. Against Kansas, FIU, and DePaul he scored no more than five points in any game, and against St. John's he missed five of his six shots. Despite Smith's declining performance, he was the Hoyas' third-leading scorer for the season as of the completion of the St. John's game on January 4, averaging 11.6 points per game, and with him on the court the Hoyas had gone 10–3 in their first 13 games. Georgetown thus suffered a major blow to its roster on January 8 when Smith did not accompany the team for its third conference game, a road game at Providence. Georgetown officials revealed that Smith would not play again until he resolved an academic issue, and, after he had continued to struggle in his classes, Georgetown announced on January 24 that he had been dismissed from the team and would not play for the remainder of the 2013–14 season, but would return for the 2014-2015 season if his academic performance improved enough by then. With Smith out, Thompson was forced to move power forward Mikael Hopkins to center and play Reggie Cameron and Nate Lubick at forward, giving the Hoyas an undersized and less experienced front court. Facing a Providence team on the evening of January 8 that had lost three games in a row, D'Vauntes Smith-Rivera scored 19 points and Hopkins had 12, but the revamped Georgetown line-up fared poorly in an 18-point loss to the Friars. The loss broke a nine-game Georgetown winning streak over Providence that dated back to March 2005 and a three-game Hoya winning streak at the Dunkin Donuts Center. Georgetown also lost another player during the game when Jabril Trawick suffered a broken jaw, forcing him to miss the next five games.

Although the Hoyas bounced back for an overtime win at Butler in which D'Vauntes Smith-Rivera scored 18 points, Markel Starks had 15, and Aaron Bowen came off the bench to score 11, handing the Bulldogs their fourth straight loss, Georgetown and its depleted roster then went into a tailspin, losing at Xavier, at home against Seton Hall and at home in overtime against Marquette, and at Creighton. At Xavier, Markel Starks scored 19 points, D'Vauntes Smith-Rivera had 18 for the second straight game, and Reggie Cameron scored in double digits for the first time in his collegiate career with a 13-point performance, and as a team the Hoyas tied their season record by connecting on 10 three-pointers, but the Hoyas blew a 17-point lead with 15 minutes to play, failing to score during the game's final six minutes. The pattern repeated itself three days later, when Seton Hall overcame a 10-point deficit in the second half and held the Hoyas scoreless over the last 9:44 of the game to beat Georgetown. It was Seton Hall's first defeat of Georgetown in a game in Washington since an overtime victory on January 29, 2003, and the first one in regulation since January 8, 2000; against the Pirates, Smith-Rivera had 14 points, Aaron Bowen came off the bench to score 13, and Mikael Hopkins contributed 11. The game with Marquette broke a string of seven straight games between the schools in which at least one of the teams had been in the Top 25, and Marquette – picked pre-season to win the Big East and, like the Hoyas, falling well short of expectations – arrived winless on the road in Big East play for the season, but the Hoyas blew a seven-point lead with three minutes to play and the Golden Eagles outscored them 15–7 in overtime. Markel Starks had a career-high 28 points and Smith-Rivera had 24, while Mikael Hopkins contributed 11 rebounds and six points against Marquette. In the loss at first-place Creighton five nights later before a school-record crowd of 18,859 at CenturyLink Center Omaha, Starks had 21 points, Smith-Rivera had 18, and Hopkins had 14, and Nate Lubick pulled down 10 rebounds, but the Hoyas shot 39 percent from the field; it was their third sub-40-percent performance in a row.

Losers of four in a row and five of their last six, the Hoyas came home to host the first ranked opponent of their conference season, No. 9 Villanova. Their depleted roster received a reinforcement for the game when Jabril Trawick returned to action; he had recovered more quickly than expected from his broken jaw and missed only five games because of the injury, and he played 12 minutes against the Wildcats. But John Thompson III also had to deal with another player loss, when back-up center Moses Ayegba received a one-game NCAA suspension less than three hours before game time because of a pre-enrollment infraction. The game had no flow, with the teams combining for 34 turnovers (18 by Georgetown) and 39 fouls to go with their 41 field goals. Amid the frequent stoppages of play, Georgetown scored the game's first eight points, giving the Hoyas what turned out to be their largest lead of the game. The Wildcats took advantage of a big disparity in free throw opportunities, going 22-for-28 (79 percent) from the line while Georgetown went 8-for-9 (89 percent). Villanova led 35–30 at the half, but Georgetown came back repeatedly to tie the game in the second half at 35–35, 37–37, 39–39, and 43–43 before Villanova pulled ahead for good with 10:04 to play. The Wildcats stretched their lead to as many as five points, but the Hoyas closed to 61–58 with 2:08 remaining before Villanova used free throws to close out a 65–60 victory. Markel Starks had 20 points for the Hoyas and Reggie Cameron had 12, but the Hoyas went down to their fifth straight defeat, tying the longest losing streak of John Thompson III's ten-season tenure at Georgetown set in 2011; it also was their third straight home loss, giving them their longest home losing streak since 2009. They had lost six of the seven games they played after Joshua Smith's departure and seven of their last eleven.

Georgetown's next game was a non-conference affair against seventh-ranked Michigan State – its second Top-Ten opponent of the year – at Madison Square Garden in New York City on February 1, 2014; preceded by a game between Marquette and St. John's, it was the second game of the "Super Saturday Hoops" doubleheader celebrating the following day's Super Bowl XLVIII at MetLife Stadium in nearby East Rutherford, New Jersey. The two teams had met only once previously, when the Spartans knocked the Hoyas out of the 1986 NCAA tournament in its second round. Michigan State came into the game with a record of 19–2 and was a heavy favorite despite playing with a front court weakened by injuries to senior center Adreian Payne and junior guard Branden Dawson. Trailing 30–29 at halftime, the Hoyas began the second half with an 11–2 run to take a 40–32 lead with 14:26 remaining in the game. Sophomore guard Gary Harris scored a game-high 20 points for the Spartans, and his three-pointer with 1:32 left reduced Georgetown's lead to 56–54. Jabril Trawick then made two key plays, tipping in a missed shot to give Georgetown a 58–54 lead and soon afterwards scoring on a breakaway dunk to give the Hoyas a 63–55 advantage. The Hoyas, who shot only 2-for-12 (16.7 percent) from three-point range but 22-for-49 (44.9 percent) from the field overall, held the Spartans to 39.3 percent shooting from the field, and became only the fourth team to outrebound Michigan State during the season, 37–30. Markel Starks led Georgetown with 16 points, D'Vautes Smith-Rivera scored 12, Trawick had eight, and the Georgetown front court had a strong game with Lubick scoring eight points as Georgetown broke its losing streak with a shocking 64–60 upset of Michigan State and defeated a ranked opponent for the second time during the season.

The victory over Michigan State raised hopes that Georgetown's season would turn around, and it began a four-game winning streak for the Hoyas, who returned to conference play and entered a stretch in which they played a number of the Big East's struggling teams. First, they won at DePaul two days later – Georgetown's 14th straight win over the Blue Demons, a streak dating back to January 22, 1994 – and then they came home to defeat Butler and Providence. Against DePaul, Markel Starks shot only 6-for-18 (33 percent) from the field, but he hit three three-pointers and 11 of his 14 free throws (79 percent) to finish with a game-high 26 points, while Trawick had 15 points, Nate Lubick grabbed 10 rebounds to go with his three points, and Smith-Rivera – mired in a 4-for-24 (17 percent) shooting slump from the field in Georgetown's previous two games and an 0-for-5 showing in the first half against DePaul – went 3-for-6 in the second half and scored 17 points. In the Butler game – in which Georgetown turned the ball over only seven times for the second straight game and won despite a career-high 24 points by Bulldog freshman forward Andrew Chrabascz – Starks led the team with 19 points, Smith-Rivera added 18, and Lubick scored 10 while pulling down nine rebounds. Despite 31 points by Providence senior guard Bryce Cotton, the Hoyas came from behind to deal the Friars their third consecutive loss as Smith-Rivera, who had missed 17 straight three-pointers going into the game, went 2-for-4 from beyond the arc and scored 22 points, Starks contributed 14, Reggie Cameron had 11, and Mikael Hopkins grabbed 11 rebounds and scored eight. By the end of the Providence game, the Hoyas had evened their conference record at 6–6 – putting them back in contention for a possible bid to the 2014 NCAA tournament – although four of those wins had come against the two teams with the worst records in the Big East, Butler and DePaul.

Georgetown's hopes for greater success late in the season dimmed after two straight one-sided road losses to St. John's and Seton Hall that followed the winning streak. Freshman guard Rysheed Jordan scored a career-high 24 points against the Hoyas, who got into foul trouble, to lead the Red Storm to its eighth win in nine games, despite 15 points by Smith-Rivera and 13 each by Starks and Trawick. Four days later, the Pirates broke a three-game losing streak, winning for only the fourth time in 12 games, and completed their first season sweep of the Hoyas since the 2002–2003 season, with Smith-Rivera scoring 20, Starks 13, and Trawick 11 in a losing cause. It was only the third time since the creation of the original Big East Conference in 1979 that Seton Hall had swept Georgetown in a season, and the back-to-back losses dropped Georgetown to 6–8 in Big East play, with a tougher part of their schedule looming to close out the regular season. The Hoyas never led during the two losses.

The Hoyas bounced back for a 74–52 home win against Xavier in which they never trailed, ending up with their most decisive victory in a Big East game since a 61–39 defeat of Syracuse on March 9, 2013. Jabril Trawick made his first start since breaking his jaw on January 8 and scored 13 points, while Markel Starks had a game-high 22. However, another loss followed in a visit to Marquette five days later, as the Hoyas missed two layups in the final seconds and the Golden Eagles won 75–73, their fifth victory in six games. Starks led the Hoyas with 24 points against Marquette, while Smith-Rivera had a 19-point performance and Trawick contributed 16.

Georgetown completed its regular season with games against two ranked conference opponents. The penultimate game was against No. 13 Creighton, with four Georgetown seniors playing in their final home game. During halftime Georgetown announced that its new on-campus athletic center would be named the John R. Thompson Jr. Intercollegiate Athletics Center, after John Thompson Jr., the Hoyas' head coach from 1972 to 1999 and father of John Thompson III and of former Georgetown player Ronny Thompson. The Hoyas shot 54 percent from the field and Aaron Bowen and Mikael Hopkins limited the highest-scoring college player in the United States, Bluejays senior forward Doug McDermott – averaging 26 points per game for the season – to 9-for-23 shooting (39 percent) in field goal attempts and 4-of-11 (36 percent) from three-point range, and overall Creighton shot only 40 percent from the field and 10-for-29 (34 percent) in three-point attempts. The Hoyas jumped out to a 42–28 advantage at halftime. and early in the second half widened their lead to 16. Although McDermott scored 16 of his 22 points and made nine of his 12 rebounds – giving him a double-double – in the second half, the Bluejays never got closer than five points, closing to 66–61 with 1:42 left to play. After that, Georgetown pulled away again for a 75–63 upset victory. D'Vauntes Smith-Rivera and Markel Starks had Georgetown's first double-doubles of the season, Smith-Rivera scoring 18 points and grabbing a career-high 12 rebounds and Starks finishing with 17 points and a career-best 11 assists, while Jabril Trawick had 15 points and seven rebounds and Mikael Hopkins contributed 10 points.

Hoping for a first-round bye in the new Big East's championship tournament and to enhance its case for an NCAA Tournament bid, Georgetown traveled to meet No. 6 Villanova to close out the regular season. However, the Wildcats dominated the Hoyas, winning 77–59. The 18-point win was Villanova's largest over Georgetown since Villanova joined the original Big East Conference for the 1980-1981 season; it also gave Villanova its first 16-win conference season in school history. Markel Starks scored a game-high 20 points, D'Vauntes Smith-Rivera added 19, and Aaron Bowen came off the bench to score 13 against Villanova. Georgetown finished the regular season in seventh place in the Big East, with an 8-10 conference record and a 17–13 record overall. It was Georgetown's first losing conference record since the 2008-2009 season, and the seventh-place finish meant that the Hoyas would not get a bye in the first round of the conference championship tournament.

=== Big East tournament ===
Seeded seventh in the 2014 Big East tournament at Madison Square Garden and hoping a run to the tournament championship game would earn them an NCAA Tournament bid, the Hoyas met the conference's last-place team, 10th-seeded DePaul, in the tournament's first round. The Blue Demons had lost 12 of their last 13 games, including a 79–46 blowout by Butler in their last regular-season game, and Georgetown was the decided favorite to win. Georgetown led 25–23 at halftime but DePaul took a 28–27 lead with 18:39 left in the second half. The teams traded leads until a Markel Starks jumper put the Hoyas ahead 40–36 with 12:22 to play, but DePaul came back and retook the lead at 43–40 with 9:16 remaining. The game was tied at 45–45 with 6:40 remaining when DePaul went on a decisive 8–0 run to pull ahead 53–45. The Hoyas closed to 58–56 on a Jabril Trawick layup with eight seconds left, but DePaul freshman guard Billy Garrett Jr. sank two free throws with six seconds left and DePaul upset Georgetown 60–56. D'Vauntes Smith-Rivera went only 5-for-14 (35.7 percent) from the field but made all 10 free throws he attempted to finish with a game-high 21 points and Markel Starks had a 17-point game, but the other seven Georgetown players who appeared in the game combined for only 18 points. Overall, Georgetown went only 5-for-17 (29.4 percent) from three-point range. It was only the second victory the Blue Demons had ever had in a Big East tournament and the first since 2009, and it was the first time they had beaten the Hoyas since January 22, 1994, bringing a 14-game Georgetown winning streak against DePaul over a period of 20 years to an end. DePaul head coach Oliver Purnell won his first game against Georgetown in seven tries and first Big East tournament game in four tries. It was the first time Georgetown had lost its first game of a Big East tournament since receiving a first-round bye and losing in the second round in 2011, as well as the Hoyas' first loss in the tournament's first round since 2009. Ousting Georgetown from the tournament, DePaul moved on to face No. 14 Creighton in the quarterfinals the next day.

=== National Invitation Tournament ===
With a 17–14 record and having lost five of their last seven games, the Hoyas did not receive an invitation to the NCAA Tournament for the first time since 2009, and instead accepted a bid to the 2014 National Invitation Tournament, the third and final Georgetown NIT appearance of the John Thompson III era and the first since 2009. Seeded fourth in one of the NIT's regions, their first opponent was fifth-seeded West Virginia, a former foe in the original Big East until the Mountaineers left after the 2011-2012 season to join the Big 12 Conference, and it was the first meeting of the schools since West Virginia's change of conferences. With the Verizon Center booked by the Ringling Brothers and Barnum & Bailey Circus, Georgetown hosted West Virginia at McDonough Gymnasium, its first on-campus game since 2009, before a boisterous crowd of students. D'Vauntes Smith-Rivera had his second double-double of the season with a career-high 32 points and 10 rebounds, while Markel Starks had 14 points and grabbed a career-high seven rebounds and Jabril Trawick scored 12 points. The Hoyas shot only 37 percent from the field in the first half and went into the locker room at the half down 33–30, but they returned to shoot 52 percent from the field in the second half. After a decisive 8–0 Georgetown run early in the second half, the Hoyas took their first double-digit lead on a Nate Lubick dunk with 6:18 left to play on the way to a 77–65 win. It was their first win in a postseason tournament since the 2012 NCAA tournament and their first win in the NIT since 2005.

Georgetown advanced to the second round, visiting the region's No. 1 seed, Florida State, which had defeated Florida Gulf Coast in the first round. None of the defenses the Hoyas tried against Florida State was effective, and the Seminoles closed out the first half with a 15–5 run that gave them a 48–35 lead at halftime from which Georgetown never recovered. The Seminoles shot a season-best 68.2 percent from the field, including 68.8 percent from three-point range, and won 101–90, bringing Georgetown's season to an end. It was Florida State's first 100-plus-point game since a 106–62 win against Charlotte on December 17, 2013, and the first time Georgetown had allowed an opponent to score 100 or more points since the 2000-2001 season. Markel Starks ended his Georgetown career with a team-leading 27 points, while D'Vauntes Smith-Rivera scored 22, Jabril Trawick added 14, and Aaron Bowen had 10 points. Florida State advanced to meet third-seeded Louisiana Tech in the third round.

=== Wrap-up ===
Markel Starks finished the season having started all 33 games, and was Georgetown's second-leading scorer for the year with 17.3 points per game, shooting 46.7 percent from the field, 32.6 percent from three-point range, and 87.0 percent from the free-throw line, and he averaged 2.3 rebounds per game. D'Vauntes Smith-Rivera was the team's leading scorer, averaging in double figures for the season, with 17.6 points per game; he played in all 33 games, starting all but one of them, with a field-goal percentage of 44.5 percent, 39.3 percent shooting from beyond the arc, and 87.3 percent in free throws, and he averaged 5.0 rebounds per game. In 28 appearances and 21 starts, Jabril Trawick averaged 9.1 points per game on 51.9 percent field-goal shooting, 31.3 percent in three-pointers, with 3.1 rebounds per game, and Aaron Bowen, playing all 33 games including one start, shot 49.4 percent from the field and averaged 6.0 points and 3.7 rebounds. Mikael Hopkins started 20 games and played in all 33, and he averaged 6.0 points and 4.9 rebounds, while Nate Lubick, who played in every game and started all but one, averaging 5.1 points per game on 58.2-percent shooting, and also pulled down 5.4 rebounds per game. Moses Ayegba made 31 appearances, one of them a start, and averaged 1.9 points per game. In his abbreviated season, Joshua Smith started all 13 games he played in, averaging 11.5 points and 3.4 rebounds per game and shooting 65.5 percent from the field.

Markel Starks, Nate Lubick, Moses Ayegba, and John Caprio all graduated after the season. Starks finished his four-year Georgetown career having appeared in 126 games, starting 89 of them, shooting 42.7 percent from the field, 35.9 percent in three-pointers, and 81.3 percent in free throws, averaging 9.9 points and 1.6 rebounds per game; he went undrafted in the 2014 NBA draft, but went on to play professionally overseas. Lubick completed his four years at Georgetown having appeared in 130 games, starting 109 of them, shooting 56.5 percent from the field with 4.9 points and 4.6 rebounds per game. Ayegba, who had only played for three years at Georgetown, had a year of collegiate eligibility remaining, and he decided in April 2014 to transfer to Nebraska to play one more season of college basketball. Although a redshirt senior, Aaron Bowen still had a year of college eligibility remaining thanks to a freshman season cut short by surgery, and, although eligible to transfer without sitting out a season, he opted to return to Georgetown for the following season. Joshua Smith was another potential returnee, provided he improved his academic performance enough to be invited back. Stephen Domingo, having had little playing time in two seasons as a Hoya, announced in May 2014 that he was transferring to California, where he could begin play after sitting out the 2014-2015 season.

Thanks to suspensions, dismissals, and injuries, the shorthanded Hoyas had roster problems for most of the year, leading to a disappointing, up-and-down season; with a final record of 18–15, Georgetown had its least successful season since 2008-2009. Picked pre-season to finish second in the Big East, they finished seventh instead, their first losing season in either version of the Big East Conference since 2008–2009 and only their second losing conference season since the 2003-2004 season, with a first-round exit from the Big East tournament and an early exit from the NIT. It was only the second losing conference season of the John Thompson III era, and only the third time that a John Thompson III-coached Georgetown team missed the NCAA Tournament. The team went unranked in either national poll throughout the year, the first time that had happened since the 2003–2004 season. Georgetown's switch to the new and untested Big East Conference – less competitive during the season than its predecessor and lacking some of the old conference's luster and traditional match-ups – as well as the loss of the Hoyas' annual home game against archrival Syracuse, a dearth of nonconference home games against marquee opponents, and a mediocre Georgetown record all hurt attendance at Hoya games during the season, which dropped 20 percent from an average of 10,911 per game in 2012-2013 to 8,670 per game in 2013–2014.

== Roster ==
Riyan Williams, the son of Reggie Williams, joined the team as a walk-on this season and made the roster in January 2014. He became only the third son of a former player to play for Georgetown, and the first to do so since Patrick Ewing Jr., the son of Patrick Ewing, played for the Hoyas in the 2006–2007 and 2007–2008 seasons. Before Ewing, the only son of a former player to have played on the team was Ed Hargaden Jr. – the son of Ed Hargaden, Georgetown's first All-American and star of the 1932-33, 1933-34, and 1934-35 teams – who played for Georgetown during the 1957-58, 1958-59, and 1959-60 seasons.

2013–14 Georgetown Hoyas men's basketball team
Players
Coaches

Pos.	#	Name	Height	Weight	Year	Previous school	Hometown
C	0	Tyler Adams (injured)	6 ft 9 in (2.06 m)	254 lb (115 kg)	Jr	Brandon High School	Brandon, Mississippi
PF	1	Reggie Cameron	6 ft 7 in (2.01 m)	225 lb (102 kg)	Fr	Hudson Catholic	Hackensack, New Jersey
F	2	Greg Whittington (injured)	6 ft 8 in (2.03 m)	212 lb (96 kg)	So	Oakland Mills High School	Columbia, Maryland
F	3	Mikael Hopkins	6 ft 9 in (2.06 m)	223 lb (101 kg)	Jr	DeMatha Catholic High School	Hyattsville, Maryland
G	4	D'Vauntes Smith-Rivera	6 ft 3 in (1.91 m)	218 lb (99 kg)	So	North Central/Oak Hill Academy	Indianapolis, Indiana
G	5	Markel Starks	6 ft 2 in (1.88 m)	175 lb (79 kg)	Sr	Georgetown Preparatory School	Accokeek, Maryland
G	12	David Allen (W)	6 ft 2 in (1.88 m)	185 lb (84 kg)	So	Highland Park High School	Dallas, Texas
G	16	John Rupert	5 ft 9 in (1.75 m)	150 lb (68 kg)	Sr	Scarborough High School	Scarborough, Maine
G	21	Riyan Williams (W)	6 ft 4 in (1.93 m)	175 lb (79 kg)	So	Archbishop Carroll	Dunkirk, Maryland
F	23	Aaron Bowen	6 ft 6 in (1.98 m)	205 lb (93 kg)	RS Sr	Samuel W. Wolfson High School	Jacksonville, Florida
C	24	Joshua Smith (S)	6 ft 10 in (2.08 m)	350 lb (159 kg)	Jr	Kentwood High School	Kent, Washington
G	25	John Caprio	6 ft 6 in (1.98 m)	220 lb (100 kg)	Sr	Seton Hall Preparatory School	North Caldwell, New Jersey
F	31	Stephen Domingo	6 ft 6 in (1.98 m)	206 lb (93 kg)	So	St. Ignatius College Preparatory	San Francisco, California
C	32	Moses Ayegba	6 ft 9 in (2.06 m)	247 lb (112 kg)	Sr	Progressive Christian Academy	Kano, Nigeria
F	34	Nate Lubick	6 ft 8 in (2.03 m)	219 lb (99 kg)	Sr	St. Mark's School	Southborough, Massachusetts
C	42	Bradley Hayes	7 ft 0 in (2.13 m)	251 lb (114 kg)	So	Sandalwood High School	Jacksonville, Florida
G	55	Jabril Trawick	6 ft 5 in (1.96 m)	210 lb (95 kg)	Jr	Abington Friends School	Jenkintown, Pennsylvania

Head coach

John Thompson III

Assistant coach(es)

Kevin Broadus
Tavaras Hardy
Kevin Sutton
Othella Harrington

Legend

- (C) Team captain
- (S) Suspended
- (I) Ineligible
- (W) Walk-on
- Injured
- Current redshirt

Roster
Last update: November 8, 2013

Notes: Greg Whittington was dismissed from the team in November 2013. Joshua Smith was suspended for the season in January 2014. Riyan Williams was added to the roster in January 2014.

== Recruiting ==
College recruiting information
Name	Hometown	School	Height	Weight	Commit date
Reggie Cameron; PF	Hackensack, NJ	Hudson Catholic	6 ft 7 in (2.01 m)	210 lb (95 kg)	Sep 26, 2012
Reggie Cameron; PF	Recruit ratings: Scout: Rivals: (85)				
Overall recruit ranking:
Note: In many cases, Scout, Rivals, 247Sports, On3, and ESPN may conflict in their listings of height and weight.; In these cases, the average was taken. ESPN grades are on a 100-point scale.; Sources: "2013 Georgetown Signees". Rivals.; "2013 Georgetown Signees". Scout.; "2013 Georgetown Signees". ESPN.; "Scout.com Team Recruiting Rankings". Scout.; "2013 Team Ranking". Rivals.

== Rankings ==
Georgetown was not ranked in the Top 25, but was among other teams receiving Top 25 votes in the early weeks of the season.

Ranking movement Legend: ██ Improvement in ranking. ██ Decrease in ranking. ██ Not ranked the previous week. RV=Others receiving votes.
Poll	Pre Nov 4	Wk 2 Nov 11	Wk 3 Nov 18	Wk 4 Nov 25	Wk 5 Dec 2	Wk 6 Dec 9	Wk 7 Dec 16	Wk 8 Dec 23	Wk 9 Dec 30	Wk 10 Jan 6	Wk 11 Jan 13	Wk 12 Jan 20	Wk 13 Jan 27	Wk 14 Feb 3	Wk 15 Feb 10	Wk 16 Feb 17	Wk 17 Feb 24	Wk 18 Mar 3	Wk 19 Mar 10	Post Mar 17	Final Apr 7
AP	RV	RV		RV																	(Note: No Associated Press Poll this week.)
Coaches	RV	RV	RV	RV																	

== Schedule ==
Date time, TV	Rank^{#}	Opponent^{#}	Result	Record	Site (attendance) city, state
Regular season
11/08/2013*; 8:00 pm, ESPN		vs. No. 19 Oregon; Armed Forces Classic	L 75–82	0–1	Camp Humphreys (2,100); Pyeongtaek, South Korea
11/13/2013*; 7:00 pm, FS1		Wright State	W 88–70	1–1	Verizon Center (7,350); Washington, D.C.
11/21/2013*; 1:10 pm, ESPNU		vs. Northeastern; Puerto Rico Tip-Off First Round	L 56–63	1–2	Roberto Clemente Coliseum (4,952); San Juan, PR
11/22/2013*; 12:00 pm, ESPNU		vs. Kansas State; Puerto Rico Tip-Off Consolation 2nd Round	W 90–63	2–2	Roberto Clemente Coliseum (5,835); San Juan, PR
11/24/2013*; 2:00 pm, ESPNU		vs. No. 10 VCU; Puerto Rico Tip-Off 5th Place	W 84–80	3–2	Roberto Clemente Coliseum (7,642); San Juan, PR
11/30/2013*; 12:00 pm, FSN		Lipscomb	W 70–49	4–2	Verizon Center (8,165); Washington, D.C.
12/05/2013*; 9:00 pm, FS1		High Point	W 80–45	5–2	Verizon Center (4,676); Washington, D.C.
12/07/2013*; 12:00 pm, FS1		Colgate	W 61–55	6–2	Verizon Center (7,966); Washington, D.C.
12/17/2013*; 7:00 pm, CBSSN		Elon	W 85–76	7–2	Verizon Center (7,586); Washington, D.C.
12/21/2013*; 12:00 pm, ESPN		at No. 18 Kansas	L 64–86	7–3	Allen Fieldhouse (16,300); Lawrence, KS
12/28/2013*; 12:00 pm, FS1		FIU	W 92–57	8–3	Verizon Center (7,824); Washington, D.C.
12/31/2013; 5:00 pm, FS1		DePaul	W 61–54	9–3 (1–0)	Verizon Center (7,823); Washington, D.C.
01/04/2014; 1:00 pm, FS1		St. John's	W 77–60	10–3 (2–0)	Verizon Center (10,164); Washington, D.C.
01/08/2014; 7:00 pm, FS1		at Providence	L 52–70	10–4 (2–1)	Dunkin' Donuts Center (9,187); Providence, RI
01/11/2014; 7:00 pm, FS1		at Butler	W 70–67 ^{OT}	11–4 (3–1)	Hinkle Fieldhouse (9,640); Indianapolis, IN
01/15/2014; 7:00 pm, CBSSN		at Xavier	L 67–80	11–5 (3–2)	Cintas Center (10,250); Cincinnati, OH
01/18/2014; 12:00 pm, FS1		Seton Hall	L 57–67	11–6 (3–3)	Verizon Center (9,786); Washington, D.C.
01/20/2014; 9:00 pm, FS1		Marquette	L 72–80 ^{OT}	11–7 (3–4)	Verizon Center (9,014); Washington, D.C.
01/25/2014; 8:00 pm, FS1		at Creighton	L 63–76	11–8 (3–5)	CenturyLink Center Omaha (18,859); Omaha, NE
01/27/2014; 9:00 pm, FS1		No. 9 Villanova	L 60–65	11–9 (3–6)	Verizon Center (11,204); Washington, D.C.
02/01/2014*; 3:18 pm, FS1		vs. No. 7 Michigan State; Super Saturday Hoops	W 64–60	12–9	Madison Square Garden (12,561); New York, NY
02/03/2014; 9:12 pm, FS1		at DePaul	W 71–59	13–9 (4–6)	Allstate Arena (6,339); Rosemont, IL
02/08/2014; 1:00 pm, CBS		Butler	W 71–63	14–9 (5–6)	Verizon Center (13,011); Washington, D.C.
02/10/2014; 7:00 pm, FS1		Providence	W 83–71	15–9 (6–6)	Verizon Center (8,063); Washington, D.C.
02/16/2014; 7:00 pm, FS1		at St. John's	L 60–82	15–10 (6–7)	Madison Square Garden (10,340); New York, NY
02/20/2014; 9:00 pm, CBSSN		at Seton Hall	L 67–82	15–11 (6–8)	Prudential Center (6,590); Newark, NJ
02/22/2014; 11:30 am, FS2/FS1 (Note: Originally scheduled to air on Fox Sports 1, the first 30 minutes of the game were broadcast on Fox Sports 2 due to a scheduling conflict with a broadcast of automobile racing practice runs on Fox Sports 1. The broadcast switched to Fox Sports 1 at 12:00 noon EST with the game in progress.)		Xavier	W 74–52	16–11 (7–8)	Verizon Center (11,854); Washington, D.C.
02/27/2014; 9:12 pm, FS1		at Marquette	L 73–75	16–12 (7–9)	BMO Harris Bradley Center (14,874); Milwaukee, WI
03/04/2014; 7:00 pm, FS1		No. 13 Creighton	W 75–63	17–12 (8–9)	Verizon Center (12,105); Washington, D.C.
03/08/2014; 2:00 pm, Fox Sports Go/ FS1 (Note: Originally scheduled to air on Fox Sports 1, most of the first half of the game was broadcast online on Fox Sports Go due to a scheduling conflict with the a broadcast of the double-overtime game between St. John's and Marquette which preceded it on Fox Sports 1. The broadcast switched to Fox Sports 1 with under five minutes left in the first half.)		at No. 6 Villanova	L 59–77	17–13 (8–10)	Wells Fargo Center (18,828); Philadelphia, PA
Big East tournament
03/12/2014; 9:30 pm, FS1		vs. DePaul; First Round	L 56–60	17–14	Madison Square Garden (13,177); New York, NY
NIT
03/18/2014*; 7:00 pm, ESPN	(4)	(5) West Virginia; First round	W 77–65	18–14	McDonough Gymnasium (2,133); Washington, DC
03/24/2014*; 7:00 pm, ESPN	(4)	at (1) Florida State; Second round	L 90–101	18–15	Donald L. Tucker Center (3,541); Tallahassee, FL
*Non-conference game. ^{#}Rankings from AP Poll, (#) during NIT is Seed within Region. (#) Tournament seedings in parentheses. All times are in Eastern Time Zone.

== Awards and honors ==
=== Big East Conference honors ===
Postseason honors
Honors	Player	Position	Date awarded	Ref.
All-Big East First Team	Markel Starks	G	March 9, 2014	
All-Big East Second Team	D'Vauntes Smith-Rivera	G	March 9, 2014	
