= D'Vauntes Smith-Rivera =

American basketball player (born 1992)

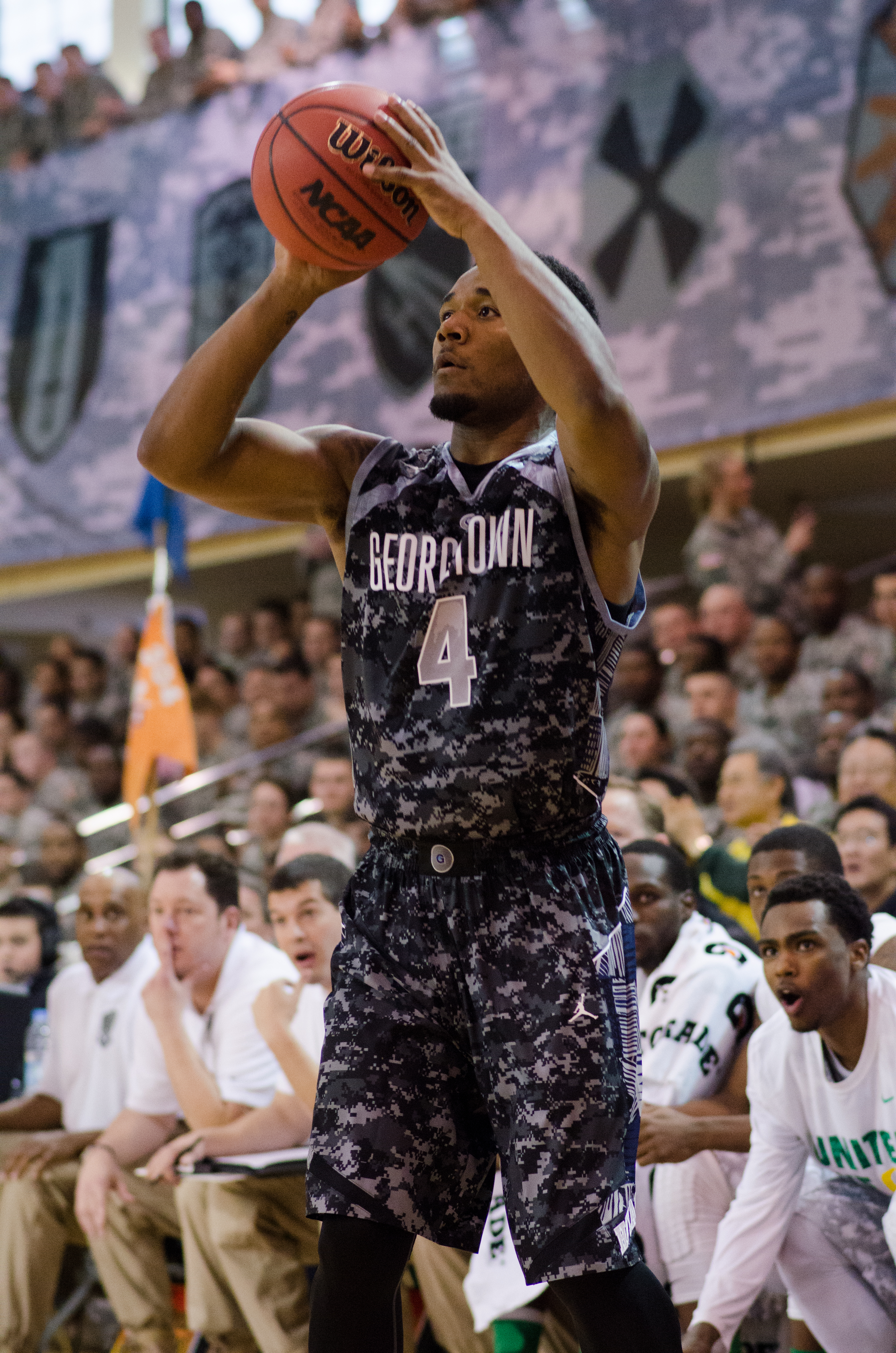
- Smith-Rivera in 2013

Personal information
- Born: December 20, 1992 (age 33) Indianapolis, Indiana, U.S.
- Listed height: 6 ft 3 in (1.91 m)
- Listed weight: 218 lb (99 kg)

Career information
- High school: North Central (Indianapolis, Indiana); Oak Hill Academy (Mouth of Wilson, Virginia)
- College: Georgetown (2012–2016)
- NBA draft: 2016: undrafted
- Playing career: 2016–2017
- Position: Shooting guard

Career history
- 2016: Windy City Bulls
- 2016: Fort Wayne Mad Ants
- 2017: Koroivos

Career highlights
- First-team All-Big East (2015); 2× Second-team All-Big East (2014, 2016); Big East All-Rookie Team (2013)
- Stats at Basketball Reference

D'Vauntes Smith-Rivera (born December 20, 1992) is an American former professional basketball player. Born in Indianapolis, he played high school basketball for North Central of his hometown and Oak Hill Academy in Mouth of Wilson, Virginia. Having enrolled in Georgetown in 2012 he played for the Hoyas until 2016. After graduation from college Smith Rivera had a brief stint in the NBA Development League.

== High school career ==
Smith-Rivera started high school at North Central High School in Indianapolis, and led his team to a state championship in his sophomore year. He transferred to the basketball specialty Oak Hill Academy in Virginia for his senior year, and he helped lead the team to the 2012 national championship.

He was recruited by Xavier, UCLA, Louisville, Memphis, NC State, and Georgetown. He visited NC State, and verbally committed to Xavier, later revoked his pledge and signed a letter of intent with the Georgetown Hoyas on October 15, 2011.

== College career ==
Smith-Rivera appeared in all 32 games his freshman year with the Hoyas, when the team won a share of the Big East Conference Regular Season Championship, and went to the 2013 NCAA Tournament. He was named to the Big East's All-Rookie team. In his sophomore year, he started all but one game, recorded two double-doubles, and led the team with a 17.6 points-per-game average. He was selected for the Big East Weekly Honor Roll five times during the season, and was named to the All-Big East Second Team at the end of the conference season.

Prior to his junior year, Smith-Rivera was selected as the Big East Preseason Player of the Year, the sixth Georgetown player to receive the award.

In March 2015, following Georgetown's Round of 32 knockout in the 2015 NCAA Men's Division I Basketball Tournament, Smith-Rivera announced he would declare for the 2015 NBA draft. A week later, Smith-Rivera reversed his decision and announced that he would stay at Georgetown for his senior year.

At the conclusion of the 2015–16 regular season, Smith-Rivera was selected to the second-team All-Big East.

== Professional career ==
After going undrafted in the 2016 NBA draft, Smith-Rivera signed with the Chicago Bulls for training camp on September 26, 2016. On October 21, 2016, he was waived by the Bulls after appearing in two preseason games. On November 1, 2016, he was acquired by the Windy City Bulls of the NBA Development League as an affiliate player of Chicago. On December 5, he was waived by Windy City. In six games, he averaged 3.0 points, 1.7 rebounds and 0.8 assists in 11.2 minutes.

On December 28, 2016, Smith-Rivera was acquired by the Fort Wayne Mad Ants. Three days later, he was waived by the Mad Ants after one game. On January 14, 2017, he signed with Koroivos of the Greek Basket League.

== The Basketball Tournament ==
D'Vauntes Smith-Rivera played for Jack Attack in the 2018 edition of The Basketball Tournament. He scored 24 points and had 7 rebounds in the team's first-round loss to Hall In.

== Personal life ==
The son of Mateo and Kelana Rivera, he has two brothers, Mateo Jr. and Rogelio. He majored in business. D'vauntes also has a son.
