= 2012–13 Georgetown Hoyas men's basketball team =

American college basketball season

2012–13 Georgetown Hoyas men's basketball

Big East regular season co-champions

NCAA tournament, Round of 64
- Conference: Big East Conference

Ranking
- Coaches: No. 17
- AP: No. 8
- Record: 25–7 (14–4 Big East)
- Head coach: John Thompson III (9th season)
- Assistant coach: Kenya Hunter (6th year); Mike Brennan (4th year); Kevin Broadus (4th year); Robert Kirby (3rd year)
- Captains: Nate Lubick; Markel Starks
- Home arena: Verizon Center

2012–13 Big East men's basketball standings
	Conf.				Overall
Team	W		L	PCT	W		L	PCT
No. 2 Louisville†**	14	–	4	.778	35	–	5	.875
No. 8 Georgetown	14	–	4	.778	25	–	7	.781
No. 15 Marquette	14	–	4	.778	26	–	9	.743
No. 20 Pittsburgh	12	–	6	.667	24	–	9	.727
No. 16 Syracuse	11	–	7	.611	30	–	10	.750
No. 23 Notre Dame	11	–	7	.611	25	–	10	.714
Villanova	10	–	8	.556	20	–	14	.588
Connecticut*	10	–	8	.556	20	–	10	.667
Cincinnati	9	–	9	.500	22	–	12	.647
Providence	9	–	9	.500	19	–	15	.559
St. John's	8	–	10	.444	17	–	16	.515
Rutgers	5	–	13	.278	15	–	16	.484
Seton Hall	3	–	15	.167	15	–	18	.455
South Florida	3	–	15	.167	12	–	19	.387
DePaul	2	–	16	.111	11	–	21	.344
† 2013 Big East tournament winner As of March 30, 2013; Rankings from AP Poll; *Ineligible for postseason play due to APR penalties.

The 2012–13 Georgetown Hoyas men's basketball team represented Georgetown University in the 2012–13 college basketball season. They were led by John Thompson III and played their home games at the Verizon Center. They were a member of the Big East Conference. Prior to the January 12 game at St. John's, the team's second leading scorer, Greg Whittington, was suspended indefinitely for academic issues. With a 61–39 win over their rival Syracuse Orange on March 9, 2013, the team clinched their 10th Big East Regular Season Championship. Georgetown lost to 15-seed and tournament newcomer Florida Gulf Coast University 78–68 in the second round of the NCAA tournament. The team was ranked No. 8 in the final Associated Press Poll of the season and No. 17 in the postseason Coaches' Poll.

This was Georgetown's last season as a member of the original Big East Conference. It had been a founding member of the conference in the 1979–80 season and had remained a member for 34 seasons, but the conference's increasingly unstable membership and uncertain future and what Georgetown and the conference's other basketball-only members believed to be its focus on college football at the expense of the interests of its basketball programs led Georgetown and six other Big East members (DePaul, Marquette, Providence, Seton Hall, St. John's, and Villanova) to leave the conference after the end of the 2012–13 season. In 2013, they joined Butler, Creighton, and Xavier in forming a new Big East Conference for the 2013–14 season. The original Big East Conference then added new members of its own and renamed itself the American Athletic Conference for the 2013–14 season.

The final regular-season meeting of Georgetown and Syracuse as Big East rivals on March 9, 2013, set an attendance record at the Verizon Center of 20,972.

== Season recap ==
Without its three top scorers from the previous season – Jason Clark and Henry Sims had graduated and Hollis Thompson had left school a year early to enter the 2012 NBA draft – Georgetown entered the season with no seniors on its roster; the roster included eleven freshman and sophomores, one more than the previous year. Returning were junior Markel Starks at point guard, sophomore Jabril Trawick at guard, junior Nate Lubick, sophomores Mikeal Hopkins, Otto Porter, and Greg Whittington, and redshirt sophomore Aaron Bowen at forward, and junior Moses Ayegba at center. The freshman recruiting class consisted of guard D'Vauntes Smith-Rivera, forward Stephen Domingo, and centers Brandon Bolden and Bradley Hayes. Junior John Caprio made the team as a walk-on guard for the third straight season, and freshman David Allen also walked on as a guard. Sophomore center Tyler Adams, sidelined early the previous season by heart arrhythmia, spent the season on a medical hardship waiver that allowed him to continue at Georgetown on a scholarship without counting against the team's scholarship total; relegated to the bench, he made the most of the situation, acting as a de facto assistant coach.

=== Non-conference schedule ===
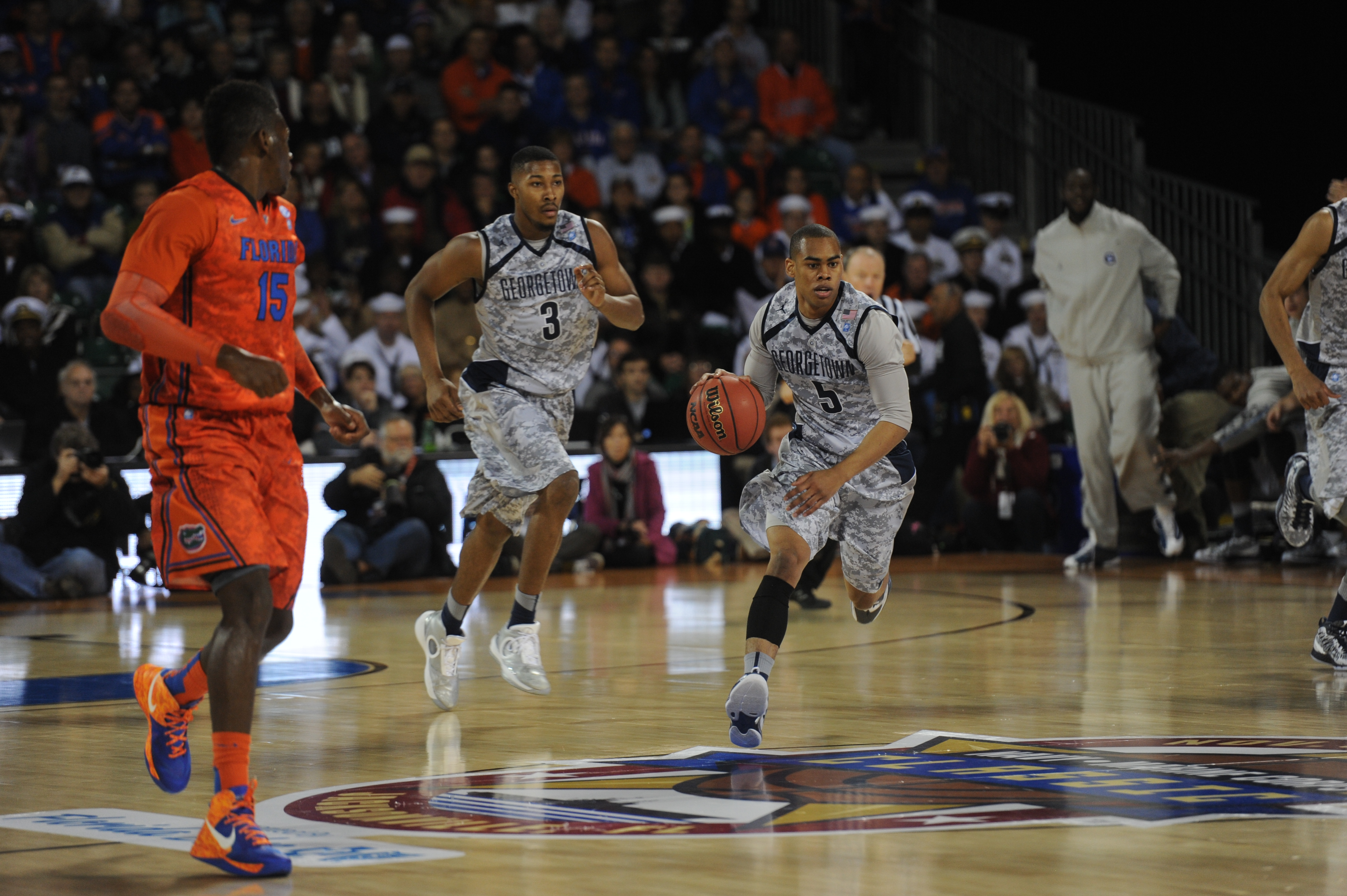
Markel Starks (#5) drives down the court during the Carrier Classic aboard USS Bataan on November 9. Mikael Hopkins (#3) follows as Florida forward Will Yeguete (#15) falls back on defense. The teams wore camouflage-themed uniforms for the game, which was cancelled after the first half due to condensation on the court.

Georgetown's season had an unusual beginning. The Hoyas started off with a ranked opponent – No. 10 Florida, a team they had not faced since losing to the Gators in the 2006 NCAA tournament – in the Carrier Classic. The game was played on November 9 in front of a crowd of nearly 3,500 people, including Olympic gold medalist swimmer Conor Dwyer, Jacksonville Jaguars players Paul Posluszny and Laurent Robinson, and United States Navy and United States Marine Corps personnel, on a court set up on the flight deck of the U.S. Navy amphibious assault ship USS Bataan, moored at Naval Station Mayport in Jacksonville, Florida. On game day, there were concerns that weather would be an issue, with temperatures expected to drop into the 50s (Fahrenheit, between 10 and 15 Celsius) during the evening and a possibility that windy conditions and condensation building up on the court would interfere with game play. In the first half, with condensation creating ever more slippery conditions, the underdog Hoyas allowed the Gators to shoot 45.5 percent from the field, but also forced Florida into eight turnovers. Florida, meanwhile, used an effective zone defense to limit Georgetown largely to perimeter shooting, and the Hoyas shot only 35.7 percent from the field and made only three three-pointers. Nate Lubick and Otto Porter led Georgetown with seven points each, and Greg Whittington and Mikeal Hopkins grabbed four rebounds apiece. Florida's greatest lead was a 10–5 advantage, and the Gators held a 27–23 lead at halftime. While United States Secretary of the Navy Ray Mabus conducted a reenlistment ceremony for U.S. Navy personnel on the ship's deck, game officials, staff, coaches, the players, and volunteers spent all of halftime and several minutes after the scheduled start time for the second half attempting to dry the court with towels, but condensation in the humid evening air nonetheless made the floor so slippery that both coaches reluctantly agreed to cease play and suspend the game for the sake of the players′ safety without beginning the second half. Although the teams discussed the possibility of resuming play on another date and possibly in another location, a mutually acceptable time and place proved elusive, and Georgetown announced on November 28 that it would not agree to schedule the game's completion. The game was canceled, and did not count in the record of either team.

Georgetown followed this disappointing beginning to its season by participating for the first time in the Legends Classic, in which the Hoyas first played two pre-selected mid-major opponents at the Verizon Center in non-tournament "regional" rounds, then went to the Barclays Center in Brooklyn, New York, to play in a four-team tournament for the Classic championship, while its two regional opponents went to play in a parallel tournament of four mid-major teams in Pittsburgh, Pennsylvania. In the first regional round, Georgetown faced Duquesne for the first time since December 1995 – and only the second since December 1962 in a series the Dukes led 10–3 entering the game. The Hoyas defeated the Dukes despite a first half in which Georgetown shot 5-of-22 (22.7%) from the field and committed seven turnovers and a second half in which they committed 10 more turnovers. Three days later, the Hoyas beat Liberty in the second regional round. In his collegiate debut, D'Vauntes Smith-Rivera came off the bench to score a team-leading 19 points against Duquesne, followed by 11 against Liberty. Greg Whittington had 15 rebounds in the Duquesne game and finished with a game-high and career-high 18 points against Liberty in a game in which Georgetown shot only 2-for-15 (13.3%) from three-point range but outscored the Flames 34–10 in the paint, including 24–0 in the first half. Mikael Hopkins scored 13 points against both the Dukes and the Flames, while Nate Lubick also scored 13 against Liberty and grabbed eight rebounds. Struck in the head six minutes into the Duquesne game, Otto Porter sat out the rest of that game and the entire Liberty game with concussion symptoms.

The Hoyas moved on to the Barclays Center to face much tougher opposition in the tournament portion of the Classic, meeting No. 11 UCLA in the semifinals. Leading 31–29 at halftime, Georgetown opened the second half with a 12–0 run that gave the Hoyas their biggest lead of the game at 43–29. The Bruins fought their way back to a 59–53 deficit, but the Hoyas then outscored them 7–1 to extend the lead to 66–54 with 6:17 to play. Again the Bruins began to close the gap, scoring to make it 77–70 with 50 seconds remaining. They did not score again, however, and Georgetown hung on for a 78–70 upset victory. The Hoyas shot 18-for-30 (60.0%) in the second half and 30-for-55 (54.5%) for the game; they outrebounded the Bruins 40–31 and had eight blocked shots to UCLA's four. Markel Starks scored a career-high 23 points, and Otto Porter returned to action and made his first collegiate start, finishing with a double-double (18 points and 11 rebounds). Greg Whittington had 13 points, and Nate Lubick had 11.

The Hoyas advanced to the Classic's championship game, meeting No. 1 Indiana. During a wild, back-and-forth first half, the two teams combined to shoot 14-for-24 (58.3%) from three-point range, and Indiana led by seven points with 4:22 until halftime, but the Hoyas reduced the Hoosiers′ lead to 36–32 at the half. In the second half, Georgetown fell behind 44–39, then went on a 10–1 run keyed by Otto Porter and Jabril Trawick to take a 49–45 lead. The Hoosiers scored six unanswered points to retake the lead, 51–49, but Georgetown tied the game at 51–51 with 9:22 remaining. The Hoyas then went scoreless for six minutes. With two minutes left in regulation, Indiana grabbed an offensive rebound and took a 61–54 lead on a layup by Hoosier senior guard Jordan Hulls. Greg Whittington finally broke the Georgetown scoring drought with a layup that closed the score to 61–56, but two Indiana free throws stretched the Hoosiers′ lead back to 63–56 with 1:18 left in regulation. But Georgetown mounted a comeback, with Market Starks and Otto Porter sinking consecutive three-pointers to reduce Indiana's lead to 63–62. Following a Hoosier free throw, Porter hit a layup with 4.6 seconds left that tied the game at 64–64 and forced overtime. In overtime, Indiana scored the first six points and pulled out to a 79–68 lead with 57 seconds left to play. Mikeal Hopkins, Porter, Starks, and Trawick all fouled out in overtime, during which the Hoyas were forced to foul repeatedly to stop the clock and Indiana went 13-for-18 (72.2%) from the foul line and outscored Georgetown 18–8. Hulls sank a three-pointer with about a minute left in overtime to give Indiana a 10-point lead, which the Hoosiers held onto to win 82–72. Indiana went 26-for-36 (72.2%) in free throws to Georgetown's 9-for-10 (90%) and went 11 of 17 (64.7%) on three-pointers to Georgetown's 11 of 26 (42.3%). Markel Starks finished with a game-high 20 points, his second straight game with 20 or more points, and Otto Porter had 15, Greg Whittington 12, and Mikeal Hopkins 11. Indiana head coach Tom Crean called the game an "epic battle," saying of both teams that "everyone that played in that [game] absolutely left it out there."

The Hoyas rounded out their non-conference schedule with a seven-game winning streak that began with a home win over Mount St. Mary's in which Otto Porter finished with a double-double (17 points and 13 rebounds), Greg Whittington also scored 17 points, Markel Starks contributed 15 points, and Mikeal Hopkins added 13. Making the Associated Press Top 25 for the first time at No. 20, they next beat Tennessee 37–36 in an SEC–Big East Challenge game that saw them set a school record for the fewest points scored in any game since the institution of the shot clock in the 1985–86 season; they also scored the fewest points by a Georgetown team since a 37–36 win over Southern Methodist during a pre-shot-clock "slowdown" game in the 1984 NCAA tournament. It was the Volunteers′ second-worst scoring performance of the shot-clock era and the lowest since a 42–35 loss to Auburn in 1997. From the field, Georgetown shot 36 percent and Tennessee 33 percent, the teams combined to shoot 7-for-20 (35%) from the free-throw line, no one scored during the last 4:10 of play, and no player on either team scored in double digits. Rising to No. 15 in the AP Poll, where they would remain for the next month, the Hoyas then defeated Texas – only the second meeting between the teams and the first since January 1972 – at Madison Square Garden in the Jimmy V Classic, making only four of their 18 three-point attempts (22.2%) but allowing Texas only 41 points on 29.2 percent shooting from the field, the Longhorns′ lowest point total in a game since the arrival of Rick Barnes as their head coach in 1998–99. The Hoyas then returned to the Verizon Center to sweep a four-game homestand that began with another low-scoring win in which Georgetown managed only 17 points on 17 percent shooting from the field in the first half and 46 points on only 29 percent shooting for the game against Towson. Two days later, they forced Longwood into 30 turnovers in the first meeting of the teams, the most by a Georgetown opponent since Elon turned the ball over 32 times on December 13, 2003; Longwood dropped to 0–7 against Big East teams and 0–8 against ranked teams since becoming an NCAA Division I team in 2004–05. In its win over American on December 22, Georgetown extended its winning streak against the Eagles to nine, the last Hoya loss to American having come 30 years earlier in an upset on December 15, 1982. Otto Porter had 14 points against Texas, 10 against Towson, took another blow to the head in the Longwood game but returned to action and finished with a game-high 22 points, scored 12 points and grabbed nine rebounds against Western Carolina, and had a double-double (16 points and 11 rebounds) against American. Markel Starks finished with 11 points against Texas, 17 against Longwood, and 10 against Western Carolina, while Nate Lubick scored 13 points against Texas and 10 against Towson. Mikeal Hopkins also contributed 10 points against Towson. Greg Whittington had a team-high 11 points against Towson and a career-high 25 against Western Carolina, and Jabril Trawick finished with 14 points against Western Carolina.

After the completion of the Western Carolina game on December 15, Georgetown athletic director Lee Reed broke the news to the press that seven Big East schools that did not have NCAA Division I football programs – DePaul, Georgetown, Marquette, Providence, St. John's, Seton Hall, and Villanova, which the press dubbed the "Catholic Seven," although John Thompson III told the press that religious affinity had no bearing on the decision – would leave the storied Big East Conference, which they had come to view as too focused on football to accommodate the interests of the basketball-only schools. They planned to form a new "basketball-centric" conference designed in the same way the Big East – of which Georgetown was an original member – had been when it was founded in 1979. At the time, it was not clear how quickly the conference exit would take place or what the new conference would be named.

The Hoyas finished the non-conference portion of their schedule with a 10–1 record – with the only loss coming against the No. 1 team in the country – and an unusually long two-week break in action between their game against American and the beginning of Big East play. Despite their success, they faced questions about their sometimes sluggish scoring, as well about their perimeter defense, as they prepared for a challenging conference schedule.

=== Conference schedule ===
Playing its first game since December 22, Georgetown opened its Big East season on January 5, 2013, with an upset loss at Marquette that snapped the Hoyas′ winning streak at seven games. They dropped to No. 19 in the AP Poll, then suffered another upset loss at the hands of Pittsburgh three days later. The Hoyas′ early-season shooting woes continued. Marquette held Georgetown – which missed 10 of its first 12 shots – to 48 points, 16 points below the Hoyas' season average, and won by one point; Markel Starks led the Hoyas with 18 points against the Golden Eagles, while Otto Porter and Greg Whittington each finished with 13 points and Whittington pulled down eight rebounds. The 73–45 loss to Pittsburgh was Georgetown's largest margin of defeat since a 104–71 loss to Maryland at the Capital Centre – not yet the Hoyas′ home court at the time – on December 10, 1974, and the largest home loss since a 107–67 defeat by St. John's at McDonough Gymnasium on December 7, 1971. Georgetown shot 35 percent in field-goal attempts and no Hoyas scored in double figures, while the Panthers shot 55 percent from the field and completed a three-game streak in which they beat the Hoyas at the Verizon Center by 16, 15, and 28 points. It was the most lopsided Big East road win in Pittsburgh's history, and the Hoyas emerged from the game shooting only 38.7 percent from the field for the season while allowing opponents to average 55.7 points per game. Georgetown opened 0–2 in the conference play for the first time since the 2001–02 season, but the two defeats also were their only back-to-back losses of the regular season.

The Pittsburgh game turned out to be Greg Whittington's last as a Hoya. He had started all 13 games of the season and was second on the team in both points per game (12.0) and rebounds per game (7.0), but was declared academically ineligible and suspended before the next game. He saw no action for the remainder of the season, and after sitting out the beginning of the following season as well with an injury, was dismissed from the team in January 2014.

The Hoyas won their next two games to even their conference record at 2–2, first returning to Madison Square Garden to cruise to a win over St. John's in a game in which Otto Porter had a double-double (19 points and a season-high 14 rebounds), Markel Starks scored 17 points, Nate Lubick finished with 11, and D'Vauntes Smith-Rivera grabbed 10 rebounds in addition to scoring eight points. They dropped out of the AP Top 25 before they hosted Providence, but they beat the Friars for the eighth straight time behind 20 points and eight rebounds by Otto Porter before he fouled out, 16 points by Markel Starks, and a 10-point performance by Nate Lubick. However, Georgetown lost at South Florida three days later, the Bulls coming from 11 points behind at the half to win their first conference game of the season. Otto Porter led the Hoyas again with 21 points against South Florida, while D'Vauntes Smith-Rivera scored 16 off the bench and Nate Lubick finished with 10 rebounds and eight points. The Hoyas fell to 12–4 on the year, 2–3 in the Big East.

The Hoyas next visited No. 24 Notre Dame, their second ranked opponent of the season and the first ranked team they met in the Big East season, and began to turn their season around. Georgetown outscored Notre Dame 10–4 in the first 4:44 of play; the Fighting Irish hit only one of their first five field-goal attempts and only three of their first ten, and Notre Dame scored only eight points in the first ten minutes of the game. Late in the first half, the Hoyas shot only 3-for-10 over a six-minute span, allowing Notre Dame to close to 25–21, but over the last 4:01 of the half Georgetown went on a 9–0 run to go to the locker room with a 34–21 lead. Early in the second half, Notre Dame had a 10–0 run of its own to close to 40–37, but the Fighting Irish went scoreless over a seven-minute stretch while Georgetown scored 18 unanswered points to take a decisive lead. The Hoyas shot 53 percent from the field, outrebounded Notre Dame 35–24, and held the Fighting Irish to season lows in field-goal percentage (35 percent), assists (11), and points on the way to a 63–47 upset win. It was only Notre Dame's third loss in its last 24 Big East home games. Otto Porter led the Hoyas with 19 points and nine rebounds, D'Vauntes Smith-Rivera came into the game to score 14 points, and Moses Ayegba came off the bench to grab 10 rebounds. Georgetown evened its conference record at 3–3.

Georgetown returned to the Verizon Center to begin a three-game homestand by facing its second ranked opponent in a row, No. 5 Louisville. Georgetown led 33–29 at halftime. With 3½ minutes to play in the game, Aaron Bowen – a redshirt sophomore who previously had scored only 47 points over his collegiate career – scored his only points of the game by appearing seemingly out of nowhere to make an acrobatic move to tip in D'Vauntes Smith-Rivera's missed layup and score the game's decisive basket, giving the Hoyas a 52–50 lead. Louisville – which made all 12 of its first-half free throws but shot only 4-for-10 from the free-throw line in the second half – made only one of two free throws with 2:22 to play to close to 52–51. The Cardinals had several chances to take the lead after that, but failed to take advantage of them, and Louisville senior guard Peyton Siva – who got into foul trouble and finished scoreless in a game for the first time since his freshman year – missed a potential game-winning jumper with 1.4 seconds to play. Otto Porter pulled down the rebound, his 12th of the game, was fouled, and made one of two free throws to finish with 17 points, giving him a double-double. The underdog Hoyas won 53–51, dealing Louisville its third straight loss, the Cardinals′ longest losing streak since January 2010. Like Porter, Markel Starks scored 17 points. The second half had lasted a half-minute longer than it was supposed to because play continued for 30 seconds while the clock was stopped at 6:07, but the officiating mistake appeared to have no impact on the final result.

The wins at Notre Dame and against Louisville were the first in what became an 11-game Georgetown winning streak. Georgetown swept the homestand, following the victory over Louisville by defeating Seton Hall and winning a rematch with St. John's. Returning to the AP Top 25 at No. 20 in the AP Poll, they then went on the road to beat Rutgers. During the Seton Hall game, play did not stop even though the lights dimmed for several minutes in the second half due to a storm in the Washington, D.C., area, and the Hoyas finished with a season-high 15 steals. Otto Porter scored 20 points and Markel Starks 16, D'Vauntes Smith-Rivera came off the bench to add 11, and walk-on John Caprio – who entered the game having played only 13 minutes all season and only 42 minutes in his collegiate career, scoring eight points and committing 10 turnovers – had three points, two rebounds, an assist, and a steal in 5½ minutes of play in the first half and finished the game with four points, six rebounds, two assists, and a steal. Against St. John's three days later, Nate Lubick, who entered the game shooting 23-of-33 (69.7%) from the field over the previous five games, sank eight of 10 shots to lead the Hoyas with 16 points and 10 rebounds for a double-double, while Markel Starks and Jabril Trawick each scored 12 and D'Vauntes Smith-Rivera added 11. At Rutgers, the Hoyas shot 57.4 percent from the field for the game and 60.9 percent in the second half; Otto Porter had a double-double with 19 points – 15 of them in the second half – and 14 rebounds, while Starks had a team-high 20 points, Mikeal Hopkins came out of an offensive funk to score 14, and Smith-Rivera added 13 off the bench.

Rising to No. 15 in the AP Poll, Georgetown returned home to meet Marquette; unranked when they had upset the Hoyas to start out the Big East season, the Golden Eagles now were ranked No. 18. Both teams mounted aggressive defenses and officials called a tight game, leading to a contest characterized mostly by turnovers, steals, and offensive fouls. Georgetown led 33–23 at halftime, but started the second half by going nearly seven minutes without a field goal while the Golden Eagles outscored them 8–2 and closed to 35–31. Marquette had closed its 10-point halftime deficit to three with 12:13 remaining in the game when, with Georgetown leading 37–34, officials called a technical foul on Golden Eagles head coach Buzz Williams for arguing an out-of-bounds call. The call changed the game's momentum, prompting an 8–1 run by the Hoyas. Marquette never got closer than eight points the rest of the way, and Georgetown won 63–55, moving into a second-place tie with Marquette in the Big East standings. Otto Porter finished with 21 points, Markl Starks with 16, and Nate Lubick with 10. The Hoyas scored 24 points off 19 turnovers during the game.

The Hoyas next squandered a 12-point lead but came from behind to win at Cincinnati, breaking a four-game losing streak against the Bearcats and winning their first game at Cincinnati since the 2006–07 season. Markel Starks had a game-high 17 points and Otto Porter scored 16 against the Bearcats. The Hoyas emerged from the Cincinnati game with the longest active winning streak in the Big East (seven games) and ranked seventh in the United States in defense at 55.7 points allowed per game, although they averaged only 64.3 point per game themselves. After climbing to No. 11 in the AP Poll, they won at home against DePaul in a rout in which D'Vauntes Smith-Rivera shot 10-for-12 (83.3%) from the field, including 5-for-6 from three-point range, and went 8-for-10 in free-throws to score 33 points, the most by a Georgetown freshman in a single game since Victor Page's 34-point performance during a game in the 1996 Big East tournament. Nate Lubick scored 15 points and grabbed eight rebounds against the Blue Demons, while Jabril Trawick had a 13-point game and Otto Porter added 11 before leaving the game early in the second half with a sore knee.

Riding an eight-game winning streak, No. 11 Georgetown next faced No. 8 Syracuse at the Carrier Dome. Syracuse had announced plans to leave the Big East in July 2013 and join the Atlantic Coast Conference, and a boisterous crowd of 35,012 – the largest ever to attend a college basketball game on any campus – attended to see the Hoyas′ last visit to Syracuse as a Big East rival. It was the 72nd crowd of over 30,000 at the Carrier Dome, and the 17th game against Georgetown there to draw more than 30,000. Georgetown got off to a very poor start, with Syracuse outscoring the Hoyas in a 10–2 run early in the game and Georgetown scoring only one basket, a two-point jumper by Otto Porter, in the game's first nine minutes. The Hoyas missed their first eight three-point attempts. But then Porter came alive, scoring 14 points during a 17–3 Georgetown run that gave the Hoyas a 21–15 lead and quieted the crowd. Then Syracuse staged a rally in the last minute of the half, scoring eight unanswered points to take a 23–21 lead at the intermission. After a halftime that featured a ceremony in which the Orange retired the jersey of former Syracuse great Carmelo Anthony, Porter led a 10–2 Georgetown run early in the second half that put the Hoyas back in front, and they led 39–31 with 11:13 left to play. But Syracuse came back, and the Orange stole an inbound pass and scored to pull ahead 41–37 with 6:38 remaining in the game. Porter followed with a three-pointer and, fouled on the shot, sank the free throw to tie the game at 41–41 with a four-point play. Georgetown outscored Syracuse 16–5 the rest of the way and pulled away for a 57–46 upset win. Only three days after D'Vauntes Smith-Rivera's 33-point game, Otto Porter went 12 of 19 from the field, including five three-pointers, to score a career-high 33 points – the only Hoya to score in double figures – and also had eight rebounds and a game-high five steals. Moses Ayegba pulled down 10 rebounds. Shooting 17-of-50 (34.0 percent) from the field – 5-of-20 (20.0%) on 3-pointers – Syracuse scored the fewest points it had in a game at the Carrier Dome since a 45-point performance against Pittsburgh in 2004, and Georgetown finished the game having held its opponents to under 60 points 17 times during the season, allowing an average of only 56.1 points per game, and having limited 11 of its last 12 opponents to shooting below 40 percent from the field. The loss dropped Syracuse head coach Jim Boeheim′s all-time record against the Hoyas to 37–35 (.513), even though he was the second-winningest coach in NCAA Division I history, with a career record of 912–309 (.748). Georgetown's win also snapped a 38-game Syracuse winning streak at the Carrier Dome, a school record on that court; the last time the Orange had lost at the Carrier Dome was also to Georgetown, on February 9, 2011. The end of Syracuse's streak prompted the press to reminisce about the last game at Syracuse's Manley Field House in February 1980, in which Georgetown had ended Syracuse's 57-game home winning streak at Manley, a Syracuse school record in that building, during the Big East's first season – a game which had sparked the Georgetown-Syracuse rivalry that largely had defined the Big East's identity over its 34 seasons.

The Hoyas′ nine-game winning streak and upset of Syracuse prompted their elevation to No. 7 in the AP Poll by the time they visited Connecticut four days later for a double-overtime thriller in a sold-out Gampel Pavilion in which the Hoyas lost a 12-point lead late in regulation and then had to come from behind in the second overtime for a one-point win. Another win followed at the Verizon Center in a rematch with Rutgers. Otto Porter led the team in both games with 22 points against Connecticut and 28 points and eight rebounds against Rutgers; in the Rutgers game, he was the only Hoya to score in double figures and he sank 15 out of 18 free throws (83.3%), the most free throws made by a Georgetown player in a single game since Mike Sweetney′s 16 on April 1, 2003. Against Connecticut, Markel Starks had 19 and D'Vauntes Smith-Rivera 14 points, and Nate Lubick added nine points and seven rebounds. The Hoyas rose to No. 5 in the AP Poll, but then their 11-game winning streak came to an end in a loss at Villanova in which the Hoyas committed 23 turnovers. It was the Wildcats′ third win of the season over a Top Five team. Otto Porter led the team for the fourth straight game with 17 points, while D'Vauntes Smith-Rivera came off the bench to score 14 and Markel Starks finished with 12.

Still ranked No. 5, Georgetown closed out its regular season by hosting No. 17 Syracuse. It was the 89th game between the teams but the final regular-season meeting between them as Big East rivals, and the crowd of 20,972 – which included former Georgetown players Patrick Ewing and Alonzo Mourning – set an attendance record at the Verizon Center and was the largest crowd ever to view a Georgetown home game. Both teams played tough defense, and in the first 17½ minutes of play they combined for 14 turnovers and only 13 field goals. Markel Starks scored the Hoyas′ first eight points and D'Vauntes Smith-Rivera their next eight, while Otto Porter did not even attempt a shot until 7:46 was left in the first half and finished the half 0-for-2 from the field and with only two points, although he did score the final points of the half on two free throws that gave Georgetown a 25–18 advantage at halftime, its biggest lead of the game at the time. Porter scored eight more points in the second half, during which the Hoyas pulled away to a 50–31 lead with 8½ minutes left to play. Georgetown outscored the Orange 11–8 the rest of the way, and the Hoyas won 61–39. The crowd celebrated by storming the court. Starks had a game-high 19 points, Smith-Rivera had 15 off the bench, Jabril Trawick scored 14, and Porter finished with 10. The win completed Georgetown's first two-game regular-season sweep of the Orange since the 2001–02 season and narrowed the Orange's lead in the series all-time to 49–41, and Georgetown enjoyed its biggest margin of victory over Syracuse since a 27-point win on March 3, 1985. Shooting 32 percent from the field and only 1-for-11 (9.1%) on three-point attempts, Syracuse scored its fewest points in 558 Big East games – and, in fact, its fewest points in any game since a 36–35 victory over Kent State on December 1, 1962.

Georgetown finished the regular season with an overall record of 24–5, having won 12 of its last 13 games. In its final season in the original Big East Conference, it finished with a 14–4 conference record, tied for first with Louisville and Marquette. It was the first time the Hoyas had finished in first-place in the conference's regular season standings since the 2007–08 season.

=== Big East tournament ===
Based on tiebreaking criteria, Georgetown was seeded first in the 2013 Big East tournament, its first No. 1 seed in the tournament since 2008. The high seed gave the Hoyas a double bye, and they did not begin play until the quarterfinals, in which they met ninth-seeded Cincinnati, which had upset eighth-seeded Providence the day before to advance to meet Georgetown. The Hoyas pulled ahead to a 24–8 lead in the first half before the Bearcats began a comeback, outscoring Georgetown 16–5 during the remainder of the half, closing to a 29–24 deficit at halftime. Cincinnati then began the second half with a 9–2 scoring run that gave them a 33–31 lead, their first lead since the first few minutes of the game. Nate Lubick hit a baseline hook to tie the score at 31–31, and then D'Vauntes Smith-Rivera led a scoring surge that combined with the characteristically strong Hoya defense for a 22–6 Georgetown run, giving the Hoyas a 53–39 lead with 3:30 to play. Georgetown continued to pull away to win 62–43. The Bearcats shot only 14-for-38 (36.8%) from the field and committed 15 turnovers. Otto Porter shot only 3-for-9 from the field but made all 11 of his free throws – most of them in the final minutes – to finish with a game-high 18 points, Markel Starks had 14, and Smith-Rivera finished with 13.

Hoping for a No.1 seed in the upcoming 2013 NCAA tournament, Georgetown moved on to the semifinals to face No. 19 Syracuse, the tournament's fifth seed, which had beaten Seton Hall and Pittsburgh to advance. It was the final game between Georgetown and Syracuse as conference rivals, and Madison Square Garden was sold out, with a mostly pro-Syracuse crowd in attendance. Georgetown pulled out to an initial 11–6 lead with 12:24 left in the first half, but a 13–0 Syracuse run – during which Georgetown did not score for just over eight minutes – gave the Orange a 27–17 advantage with 2:24 remaining in the half, and Syracuse went to the locker room with a 29–20 lead at the intermission. In the second half, the Orange extended their lead to 12 points at 37–25 with 16:16 to play. A Mikeal Hopkins dunk and five straight points by Markel Starks cut Georgetown's deficit to 37–32 with 12:41 remaining, but then Syracuse pulled out to a 43–34 advantage with 11:02 to play. Another Hoya surge followed that tied the game at 49–49 with 1:47 left in regulation. Syracuse junior center Baye Moussa Keita sank two free throws with 1:23 to play in regulation and Otto Porter hit both ends of a one-and-one to make the score 51–51 with 7.3 seconds left. After Orange sophomore guard Michael Carter-Williams missed a potentially game-winning shot at the buzzer, the game went into overtime. The Orange scored the first four points in overtime to take a lead they never lost. Markel Starks fouled out with 3:36 left in overtime and, although the Hoyas got as close as 57–55 with 40 seconds left, Jabril Trawick's last-second heave from halfcourt hit the backboard but did not go in, and Syracuse celebrated a 58–55 overtime upset win. The Hoyas shot 4-for-18 (22.2%) from three-point range and 11-for-20 (55.0%) from the free-throw line, and Syracuse's bench outscored that of the Hoyas 23–5. Georgetown dropped to 15–2 in Big East tournament games in which it was the top seed. It was the 14th and last meeting in the Big East tournament between the schools; each won seven games. It also was Syracuse head coach Jim Boeheim′s 50th win in the tournament. Syracuse advanced to the tournament championship for the 15th and final time the following day and lost to Louisville.

=== NCAA tournament ===
Falling to No. 8 in the AP Poll, but with a record of 25–6 and having won 13 of its last 15 games, Georgetown received a bid to the 2013 NCAA tournament, the Hoyas′ fourth consecutive appearance in the tournament, seventh in eight seasons, and 29th overall. Seeded second in the tournament's South Region, they met their first opponent, 15th seed Florida Gulf Coast, in the Round of 64, termed the "Second Round" this year. Florida Gulf Coast University had only started classes in 1997 and was so new that it had become eligible for postseason NCAA Division I play only in 2011; the Eagles had finished in second place in the Atlantic Sun Conference and won the conference tournament, but it was their first appearance in the NCAA tournament. The Hoyas entered the game allowing opponents to shoot only 37.6 percent from the field – fourth-best in the United States – and limiting opponents to 55.7 points per game, and were the heavy favorites. Behind 11–10 early, Georgetown used an 8–0 run to take an 18–11 lead halfway through the first half. Then their offense went cold, and the Eagles took advantage of it to finish the first half with a 13–4 run and went to the locker room with a 24–22 lead at halftime. The Eagles went on a 21–2 run in the second half to take a 52–33 lead with 12:23 left to play, and they had a 57–40 advantage with 9:22 left. A furious Georgetown rally ensued in which the Hoyas closed to 72–68 with 52 seconds remaining, but they did not score again, and the Eagles went 6-for-10 from the free-throw line the rest of the way and shocked Georgetown with a 78–68 victory, to the delight of a crowd that was rooting for the Eagles to pull off the major upset. Florida Gulf Coast hit 21 of its 49 shots from the field (42.9%), while Georgetown shot 24-for-64 (37.5%). Markel Starks scored 23 points, Otto Porter finished with a double-double (13 points and 11 rebounds), and Jabril Trawick added 11 points. For the fifth straight time, the Hoyas exited the NCAA tournament in their first weekend due to an upset by a lower-seeded opponent; it was the third time in those five tournaments that they were knocked in their first game, and their fourth straight defeat at the hands of a double-digit seed. It was only the seventh time in NCAA tournament history that a No. 15 seed had beaten a No. 2 seed. Florida Gulf Coast advanced to defeat San Diego State in the third round, but lost to Florida in the South Region semifinal.

=== Wrap-up ===
Otto Porter played in 31 of the Hoyas′ 32 games, started 30, and led the team with 16.2 points per game on 48.0 percent shooting from the field and 77.7 percent from the free-throw line, and he also led the team in rebounds with 7.5 per game. He also shot 42.2 percent from three-point range, and was a first-team All-American and the Big East Player of the Year. Markel Starks played in all 32 games and started all but one, finishing second on the team with an average of 12.8 points per game on 45.7 percent shooting from the field overall, and he hit 41.7 percent of this three-pointers and 73.1 percent of his free-throws. Greg Whittington played in all 13 games before his mid-season suspension, starting 12 of them, and averaged 12.1 points per game with a 45.1 percent field-goal percentage. D'Vauntes Smith-Rivera came off the bench in all 32 games and shot 40.4 percent from the field to average 8.9 points per game. Nate Lubick, Mikeal Hopkins, and Jabril Trawick also played in all 32 games, with Hopkins and Lubick each starting 31 of them and Trawick starting 20. Lubick added 7.1 points per game on 59.1 percent field-goal shooting, while Hopkins averaged 5.9 and Trawick 5.8 points per game. The Big East's coaches voted John Thompson III Big East Coach of the Year.

With no seniors on their roster, the Hoyas faced no attrition through graduation during the offseason. However, after an outstanding sophomore season, Otto Porter announced on April 15, 2013, that he would skip his final two years of college eligibility and enter the 2013 National Basketball Association Draft. He left Georgetown having played 64 games in his two years as a Hoya, starting 38 of them, and averaging 12.8 points and 7.1 rebounds per game for his collegiate career. In the draft, the Washington Wizards selected him as the third overall pick. Meanwhile, after a freshman year in which he appeared in only four games, played for only a total of five minutes, took no shots and scored no points, and had no assists or rebounds, Brandon Bolden decided to transfer to Kansas State, where he would have to sit out the following season due to transfer rules but then would have three years of college eligibility remaining. Kansas State announced his decision on May 17, 2013.

The 2012–13 Georgetown season bore many similarities to the 2011–12 season: In both years, Georgetown fielded young teams dominated by freshman and sophomores that dropped an early in-season tournament game against a highly ranked opponent but otherwise finished the non-conference schedule with a single loss, then stumbled early against conference opposition before enjoying a long conference winning streak and finishing much higher than expected in the conference standings. Both teams consistently mounted very strong defenses and climbed from an unranked start to a high ranking in the AP Poll as the season progressed. Both teams also won in their first round of Big East tournament play and lost their second game. However, both teams also were knocked out of the NCAA tournament in its first weekend by double-digit seeds, as Georgetown had in each of its five NCAA tournament appearances since the Final Four year in 2007. The 2012–13 team suffered perhaps the biggest and most embarrassing of these defeats by losing to a 15th-seeded opponent, a tournament rarity. The 2012–13 Hoyas finished with a record of 25–7, and their final ranking was No. 8 in the AP Poll and No. 17 in the Coaches Poll.

Late in the season, plans were finalized for the conference realignment announced in December 2012. What the press dubbed the "Catholic Seven" – DePaul, Georgetown, Marquette, Providence, Seton Hall, St. John's, and Villanova – announced their departure from the original Big East Conference effective June 30, 2013, and their plans to join Butler, Creighton, and Xavier to form a new conference, also to be named the Big East Conference; the new conference not only retained the right to the "Big East" name, but also the right to hold its annual postseason tournament at Madison Square Garden. West Virginia had left the conference in the summer of 2012 to join the Big 12, and over the summer of 2013 Pittsburgh and Syracuse also left the original Big East to join the Atlantic Coast Conference, while Rutgers stayed with the original conference for one more season before departing for the Big Ten in 2014. Cincinnati, Connecticut, and Louisville remained in the original Big East, which took in several new members and renamed itself the American Athletic Conference for 2013–14 and beyond; marketed as "the American," it was the legal successor to the original Big East. Both the new Big East and the American claimed the history and heritage of the original Big East as part of their own, but in the new Big East the Hoyas faced a future in an unproven conference and without their traditional rival Syracuse on their schedule.

== Roster ==
2012–13 Georgetown Hoyas men's basketball team
Players
Coaches

Pos.	#	Name	Height	Weight	Year	Previous school	Hometown
C	0	Tyler Adams (injured)	6 ft 9 in (2.06 m)	275 lb (125 kg)	So	Brandon High School	Brandon, Mississippi
G	1	John Rupert (W)	5 ft 9 in (1.75 m)	150 lb (68 kg)	Jr	Scarborough High School	Scarborough, Maine
F	2	Greg Whittington (S)	6 ft 8 in (2.03 m)	212 lb (96 kg)	So	Oakland Mills High School	Columbia, Maryland
F	3	Mikael Hopkins	6 ft 9 in (2.06 m)	223 lb (101 kg)	So	DeMatha Catholic High School	Hyattsville, Maryland
G	4	D'Vauntes Smith-Rivera	6 ft 3 in (1.91 m)	227 lb (103 kg)	Fr	North Central/Oak Hill Academy	Indianapolis, Indiana
G	5	Markel Starks	6 ft 2 in (1.88 m)	175 lb (79 kg)	Jr	Georgetown Preparatory School	Accokeek, Maryland
G	12	David Allen (W)	6 ft 2 in (1.88 m)	175 lb (79 kg)	Fr	Highland Park High School	Dallas, Texas
C	21	Brandon Bolden	6 ft 10 in (2.08 m)	205 lb (93 kg)	Fr	Sumter High School	Sumter, South Carolina
F	22	Otto Porter	6 ft 8 in (2.03 m)	205 lb (93 kg)	So	Scott County Central High School	Sikeston, Missouri
F	23	Aaron Bowen	6 ft 6 in (1.98 m)	205 lb (93 kg)	RS So	Samuel W. Wolfson High School	Jacksonville, Florida
G	25	John Caprio (W)	6 ft 6 in (1.98 m)	220 lb (100 kg)	Jr	Seton Hall Preparatory School	North Caldwell, New Jersey
F	31	Stephen Domingo	6 ft 6 in (1.98 m)	206 lb (93 kg)	Fr	St. Ignatius College Preparatory	San Francisco, California
C	32	Moses Ayegba	6 ft 9 in (2.06 m)	250 lb (113 kg)	Jr	Progressive Christian Academy	Kano, Nigeria
F	34	Nate Lubick	6 ft 8 in (2.03 m)	235 lb (107 kg)	Jr	St. Mark's School	Southborough, Massachusetts
C	42	Bradley Hayes	7 ft 0 in (2.13 m)	248 lb (112 kg)	Fr	Sandalwood High School	Jacksonville, Florida
G	55	Jabril Trawick	6 ft 5 in (1.96 m)	210 lb (95 kg)	So	Abington Friends School	Jenkintown, Pennsylvania

Head coach

John Thompson III

Assistant coach(es)

Kenya Hunter
Mike Brennan
Kevin Broadus

Legend

- (C) Team captain
- (S) Suspended
- (I) Ineligible
- (W) Walk-on
- Injured
- Current redshirt

Roster
Last update: November 20, 2012

== Rankings ==
Ranking movements Legend: ██ Increase in ranking ██ Decrease in ranking RV = Received votes
	Week																				
Poll	Pre	1	2	3	4	5	6	7	8	9	10	11	12	13	14	15	16	17	18	19	Final
AP	RV	RV	RV	20	15	15	15	15	15	19	RV	RV	RV	20	15	11	7	5	5	8	Not released
Coaches	RV	RV	RV	25	23	21	21	18	16	22	RV	RV	RV	21	15	11	8	5	5	8	17

*AP does not release post-NCAA tournament rankings.
Coaches did not release a Week 2 poll at the same time the AP did.

== Schedule ==
Date time, TV	Rank^{#}	Opponent^{#}	Result	Record	Site (attendance) city, state
Regular season
11/09/2012*; 9:00 pm, NBCSN		vs. No. 10 Florida; Navy/Marine Corps Classic	Cancelled at halftime^{[b]}		USS Bataan (3,472); Jacksonville, FL
11/11/2012*; 6:30 pm, ESPNU		Duquesne; Legends Classic Regional	W 61–55	1–0	Verizon Center (8,213); Washington, D.C.
11/14/2012*; 7:00 pm, MASN		Liberty; Legends Classic Regional	W 68–59	2–0	Verizon Center (6,743); Washington, D.C.
11/19/2012*; 8:00 pm, ESPN2		vs. No. 11 UCLA; Legends Classic Semifinal	W 78–70	3–0	Barclays Center (10,071); Brooklyn, NY
11/20/2012*; 10:00 pm, ESPN		vs. No. 1 Indiana; Legends Classic Championship	L 72–82 ^{OT}	3–1	Barclays Center (10,478); Brooklyn, NY
11/24/2012*; 12:00 pm, ESPN3		Mount St. Mary's	W 72–50	4–1	Verizon Center (7,467); Washington, D.C.
11/30/2012*; 6:30 pm, ESPN	No. 20	Tennessee; SEC–Big East Challenge	W 37–36	5–1	Verizon Center (13,656); Washington, D.C.
12/04/2012*; 7:00 pm, ESPN	No. 15	vs. Texas; Jimmy V Classic	W 64–41	6–1	Madison Square Garden (11,840); New York City, NY
12/08/2012*; 12:00 pm, MASN	No. 15	Towson	W 46–40	7–1	Verizon Center (8,322); Washington, D.C.
12/10/2012*; 7:00 pm, MASN	No. 15	Longwood	W 89–53	8–1	Verizon Center (5,283); Washington, D.C.
12/15/2012*; 12:00 pm, MASN	No. 15	Western Carolina	W 81–68	9–1	Verizon Center (7,341); Washington, D.C.
12/22/2012*; 12:00 pm, MASN	No. 15	American	W 65–48	10–1	Verizon Center (9,867); Washington, D.C.
01/05/2013; 2:00 pm, Big East Network/MASN	No. 15	at Marquette	L 48–49	10–2 (0–1)	BMO Harris Bradley Center (15,433); Milwaukee, WI
01/08/2013; 9:00 pm, ESPNU	No. 19	Pittsburgh	L 45–73	10–3 (0–2)	Verizon Center (13,011); Washington, D.C.
01/12/2013; 11:00 am, ESPN2	No. 19	at St. John's	W 67–51	11–3 (1–2)	Madison Square Garden (11,057); New York City, NY
01/16/2013; 7:00 pm, Big East Network/MASN		Providence	W 74–65	12–3 (2–2)	Verizon Center (9,210); Washington, D.C.
01/19/2013; 6:00 pm, Big East Network/MASN		at South Florida	L 58–61	12–4 (2–3)	USF Sun Dome (6,189); Tampa, FL
01/21/2013; 7:30 pm, ESPN		at No. 24 Notre Dame	W 63–47	13–4 (3–3)	Edmund P. Joyce Center (9,149); Notre Dame, IN
01/26/2013; 12:00 pm, ESPN		No. 5 Louisville	W 53–51	14–4 (4–3)	Verizon Center (17,474); Washington, D.C.
01/30/2013; 7:00 pm, MASN		Seton Hall	W 74–52	15–4 (5–3)	Varizon Center (7,567); Washington, D.C.
02/02/2013; 4:00 pm, CBS		St. John's	W 68–56	16–4 (6–3)	Verizon Center (15,625); Washington, D.C.
02/09/2013; 12:00 pm, Big East Network/MASN	No. 20	at Rutgers	W 69–63	17–4 (7–3)	Louis Brown Athletic Center (6,335); Piscataway, NJ
02/11/2013; 7:00 pm, ESPN	No. 15	No. 18 Marquette	W 63–55	18–4 (8–3)	Verizon Center (11,821); Washington, D.C.
02/15/2013; 9:00 pm, ESPN	No. 15	at Cincinnati	W 62–55	19–4 (9–3)	Fifth Third Arena (12,842); Cincinnati, OH
02/20/2013; 7:00 pm, Big East Network/MASN	No. 11	DePaul	W 90–66	20–4 (10–3)	Verizon Center (9,987); Washington, D.C.
02/23/2013; 4:00 pm, CBS	No. 11	at No. 8 Syracuse; Rivalry	W 57–46	21–4 (11–3)	Carrier Dome (35,012); Syracuse, NY
02/27/2013; 7:00 pm, ESPN2	No. 7	at Connecticut; Rivalry	W 79–78 ^{2OT}	22–4 (12–3)	Harry A. Gampel Pavilion (10,167); Storrs, CT
03/02/2013; 9:00 pm, ESPNU	No. 7	Rutgers	W 64–51	23–4 (13–3)	Verizon Center (12,931); Washington, D.C.
03/06/2013; 7:00 pm, ESPN2	No. 5	at Villanova	L 57–67	23–5 (13–4)	Wells Fargo Center (13,685); Philadelphia, PA
03/09/2013; 12:00 pm, ESPN	No. 5	No. 17 Syracuse; ESPN College GameDay/Rivalry	W 61–39	24–5 (14–4)	Verizon Center (20,972); Washington, D.C.
Big East tournament
03/14/2013; 12:00 pm, ESPN	(1) No. 5	vs. (9) Cincinnati; Quarterfinal	W 62–43	25–5	Madison Square Garden (20,057); New York, NY
03/15/2013; 7:00 pm, ESPN	(1) No. 5	vs. (5) No. 19 Syracuse; Semifinal/Rivalry	L 55–58 ^{OT}	25–6	Madison Square Garden (20,057); New York, NY
NCAA tournament
03/22/2013; 6:50 pm, TBS	(2 S) No. 8	vs. (15 S) Florida Gulf Coast; South Region First Round	L 68–78	25–7	Wells Fargo Center (N/A); Philadelphia, PA
*Non-conference game. ^{#}Rankings from AP Poll. (#) Tournament seedings in parentheses. All times are in Eastern Time Zone.

NOTES:

^{^[b]}The game was suspended with Florida leading 27–23 at halftime due to condensation on the court, and later was cancelled entirely after the teams could not find a mutually convenient date on which to resume it.

== Awards and honors ==
=== Big East Conference honors ===
Weekly honors
Honors	Player	Position	Date awarded	Ref.
Big East Player of the Week	Otto Porter	F	February 18, 2013	
Big East Player of the Week	Otto Porter	F	February 25, 2013	
Big East Player of the Week	Otto Porter	F	March 4, 2013	

Postseason honors
Honors	Player or Coach	Position	Date awarded	Ref.
Big East Player of the Year	Otto Porter	F	March 12, 2013	
All-Big East First Team	Otto Porter	F	March 10, 2013	
All-Big East Third Team	Markel Starks	G	March 10, 2013	
Big East All-Rookie Team	D'Vauntes Smith-Rivera	G	March 10, 2013	
Big East Coach of the Year	John Thompson III	Head coach	March 12, 2013	
