= Armed Forces Classic =

College basketball event

- Sport: College basketball
- First season: 2012
- No. of teams: 2

The Armed Forces Classic is a college basketball event operated on a military boatcraft, televised on ESPN, that involves one or two games played in front of military members and their families.

== History ==
The first Armed Forces Classic was held on November 9, 2012, between Michigan State and UConn, at the Ramstein Air Base in Germany. It was the first college basketball game played between two NCAA Division I teams in Europe.

The 2016 edition broke new ground for the event in several respects. It was the first to feature two games, and also the first not to be played at a military base, with games held at Stan Sheriff Center on the campus of the University of Hawaiʻi at Mānoa in Honolulu. Additionally, it was the first time tickets were sold to the general public, although all seats in the arena's lower bowl were reserved for military personnel and their families. The event was held in Honolulu to commemorate the 75th anniversary of the attack on Pearl Harbor; surrounding events were held at Joint Base Pearl Harbor–Hickam.

The game was cancelled in 2020 and 2021 due to the COVID-19 pandemic.

== Games ==
Sites for future games are tentative and may change due to military circumstances.

Armed Forces Classic (men's)
Date	Location	Winner	Score	Loser	Attendance
November 9, 2012	Ramstein Air Base, Germany	Connecticut	66–62	No. 14 Michigan State	3,288
November 8, 2013	Camp Humphreys, Korea	No. 19 Oregon	82–75	Georgetown	2,100
November 14, 2014	CGAS Borinquen, Puerto Rico	No. 8 Louisville	81–66	Minnesota	1,400
November 13, 2015	Marine Corps Base Camp Smedley D. Butler, Japan	No. 9 Gonzaga vs. Pittsburgh, canceled (Note: The referees canceled the game at halftime due to dangerous court conditions; it did not count toward either team's win–loss record. Pittsburgh was leading 37–35.)			
November 11, 2016	Stan Sheriff Center, Honolulu, Hawaii	No. 10 Arizona	65–63	No. 12 Michigan State	9,475
November 11, 2016	Stan Sheriff Center, Honolulu, Hawaii	No. 11 Indiana	103–99	No. 3 Kansas	9,475
November 10, 2017	Ramstein Air Base, Germany	No. 25 Texas A&M	88–65	No. 11 West Virginia	3,128
November 9, 2018	Fort Bliss, Texas	Texas	73–71 OT	Arkansas	1,400
November 8, 2019	Alaska Airlines Center, Anchorage, Alaska	Washington	67–64	No. 16 Baylor	5,117
November 11, 2022	USS Abraham Lincoln, San Diego, California	No. 2 Gonzaga	64–63	Michigan State	3,572

Armed Forces Classic (women's)
Date	Location	Winner	Score	Loser	Attendance
November 4, 2025	Alumni Hall, Annapolis, Maryland	No. 1 UConn	79–66	No. 20 Louisville	3,640
