= 2012–13 St. John's Red Storm men's basketball team =

American college basketball season

2012–13 St. John's Red Storm men's basketball

NIT, Second Round
- Conference: Big East Conference
- Record: 17–16 (8–10 Big East)
- Head coach: Steve Lavin (3rd year)
- Assistant coaches: Darrick Martin; Tony Chiles; Rico Hines
- Home arena: Carnesecca Arena; Madison Square Garden

2012–13 Big East men's basketball standings
	Conf.				Overall
Team	W		L	PCT	W		L	PCT
No. 2 Louisville†**	14	–	4	.778	35	–	5	.875
No. 8 Georgetown	14	–	4	.778	25	–	7	.781
No. 15 Marquette	14	–	4	.778	26	–	9	.743
No. 20 Pittsburgh	12	–	6	.667	24	–	9	.727
No. 16 Syracuse	11	–	7	.611	30	–	10	.750
No. 23 Notre Dame	11	–	7	.611	25	–	10	.714
Villanova	10	–	8	.556	20	–	14	.588
Connecticut*	10	–	8	.556	20	–	10	.667
Cincinnati	9	–	9	.500	22	–	12	.647
Providence	9	–	9	.500	19	–	15	.559
St. John's	8	–	10	.444	17	–	16	.515
Rutgers	5	–	13	.278	15	–	16	.484
Seton Hall	3	–	15	.167	15	–	18	.455
South Florida	3	–	15	.167	12	–	19	.387
DePaul	2	–	16	.111	11	–	21	.344
† 2013 Big East tournament winner As of March 30, 2013; Rankings from AP Poll; *Ineligible for postseason play due to APR penalties.

The 2012–13 St. John's Red Storm men's basketball team represented St. John's University during the 2012–13 NCAA Division I men's basketball season. The team was coached by Steve Lavin in his third year at the school. St. John's home games were played at Carnesecca Arena and Madison Square Garden and the team was a member of the Big East Conference.

== Off season ==
=== Departures ===
Name	Number	Pos.	Height	Weight	Year	Hometown	Notes
Maurice Harkless	4	F	6'8"	208	Freshman	Queens, New York	Entered 2012 NBA draft
Malik Stith	31	G	5'11"	185	Junior	Hempstead, New York	Transferred to Fairmont State
Boris Brakalov	55	G	6'2"	185	Senior	Sofia, Bulgaria	Graduated

=== Class of 2012 signees ===
College recruiting information
Name	Hometown	School	Height	Weight	Commit date
JaKarr Sampson; SF	Akron, OH	Brewster Academy	6 ft 8 in (2.03 m)	200 lb (91 kg)	Mar 14, 2012
JaKarr Sampson; SF	Recruit ratings: Scout: Rivals: (95)				
Chris Obekpa; C	Centereach, NY	Our Savior New American School	6 ft 8 in (2.03 m)	225 lb (102 kg)	Jun 11, 2012
Chris Obekpa; C	Recruit ratings: Scout: Rivals: (92)				
Felix Balamou; SG	Centereach, NY	Our Savior New American School	6 ft 3 in (1.91 m)	180 lb (82 kg)	Mar 12, 2012
Felix Balamou; SG	Recruit ratings: Scout: Rivals: (81)				
Christian Jones; PF	Arlington, TX	IMG Academy	6 ft 7 in (2.01 m)	228 lb (103 kg)	Jul 1, 2012
Christian Jones; PF	Recruit ratings: Rivals: (NR)				
Overall recruit ranking:
Note: In many cases, Scout, Rivals, 247Sports, On3, and ESPN may conflict in their listings of height and weight.; In these cases, the average was taken. ESPN grades are on a 100-point scale.; Sources: "2012 Team Ranking". Rivals.

=== Transfer additions ===
Name	Pos.	Height	Weight	Year	Hometown	Notes
Jamal Branch	G	6'3"	170	Sophomore	Kansas City, Missouri	mid-season transfer from Texas A&M (2.5 yrs eligibility remaining)
Max Hooper	G/F	6'6"	202	Sophomore	Carmel Valley Village, California	transfer from Harvard (3 yrs eligibility remaining)
Orlando Sánchez	F	6'8"	210	Junior	Nagua, Dominican Republic	junior college transfer from Monroe College (1 yr eligibility remaining)
Marco Bourgault	G/F	6'6"	200	Junior	St. Malo, France	junior college transfer from Monroe College (2 yrs immediate eligibility)

== Roster ==
2011–12 St. John's Red Storm men's basketball team
Players
Coaches

Pos.	#	Name	Height	Weight	Year	Previous school	Hometown
G	0	Jamal Branch	6 ft 3 in (1.91 m)	176 lb (80 kg)	So	Grace Prep/Texas A&M	Kansas City, MO
G	1	Phil Greene	6 ft 2 in (1.88 m)	180 lb (82 kg)	So	IMG Academy	Chicago, IL
G/F	2	Marc-Antoine Bourgault	6 ft 6 in (1.98 m)	216 lb (98 kg)	Jr	Notre Dame Prep/Monroe	Saint-Malo, France
F/C	3	God'sgift Achiuwa (redshirt)	6 ft 8 in (2.03 m)	236 lb (107 kg)	Sr	Erie C.C.	Port Harcourt, Nigeria
F	4	Christian Jones	6 ft 7 in (2.01 m)	228 lb (103 kg)	Fr	IMG Academy	Arlington, TX
G/F	10	Max Hooper (redshirt)	6 ft 6 in (1.98 m)	202 lb (92 kg)	So	Brewster Academy/Harvard	Carmel Valley, CA
G	11	D'Angelo Harrison	6 ft 3 in (1.91 m)	203 lb (92 kg)	So	Dulles	Missouri City, TX
F/C	12	Chris Obekpa	6 ft 9 in (2.06 m)	219 lb (99 kg)	Fr	Our Savior New American	Makurdi, Nigeria
F	14	JaKarr Sampson	6 ft 8 in (2.03 m)	206 lb (93 kg)	Fr	Brewster Academy	Akron, Ohio
G/F	15	Sir'Dominic Pointer	6 ft 5 in (1.96 m)	196 lb (89 kg)	So	Quality Education Academy	Detroit, MI
F	22	Amir Garrett	6 ft 6 in (1.98 m)	190 lb (86 kg)	So	Bridgton Academy	Los Angeles, CA
G	24	Felix Balamou	6 ft 4 in (1.93 m)	189 lb (86 kg)	Fr	Our Savior New American	Conakry, Guinea
G	30	Jamal White (W)	6 ft 4 in (1.93 m)	200 lb (91 kg)	Sr	Roosevelt/Long Island	Roosevelt, NY
F	33	Orlando Sánchez (I)	6 ft 9 in (2.06 m)	216 lb (98 kg)	Jr	Colegio Nueva Luz/Monroe	Nagua, D.R.
F	35	Khadim Ndiaye (W)	6 ft 6 in (1.98 m)	195 lb (88 kg)	So	Christ the King	Queens, NY
F	40	Sam Sealy (W)	6 ft 8 in (2.03 m)	195 lb (88 kg)	So	Longwood	Medford, NY

Head coach

- Steve Lavin (Chapman)

Assistant coach(es)

- Darrick Martin
- Rico Hines
- Tony Chiles
- Gene Keady (special asst.)

Legend

- (C) Team captain
- (S) Suspended
- (I) Ineligible
- (W) Walk-on
- Injured
- Current redshirt

== Schedule ==
Date time, TV	Rank^{#}	Opponent^{#}	Result	Record	Site (attendance) city, state
Exhibition
November 3*; 5:30 pm, ESPN3		Sonoma State	W 73–55		Carnesecca Arena (3,324); Queens, NY
November 6*; 7:30 pm, ESPN3		Concordia	W 87–36		Carnesecca Arena (3,829); Queens, NY
Non-conference regular season
November 13*; 2:00 pm, ESPN		Detroit	W 77–74	1–0	Carnesecca Arena (3,506); Queens, NY
November 15*; 5:00 pm, ESPNU		at College of Charleston; Charleston Classic quarterfinals	W 64–53	2–0	TD Arena (4,716); Charleston, SC
November 16*; 5:30 pm, ESPN3		vs. Murray State; Charleston Classic semifinals	L 67–72	2–1	TD Arena (4,780); Charleston, SC
November 18*; 6:00 pm, ESPNU		vs. No. 16 Baylor; Charleston Classic third-place game	L 78–97	2–2	TD Arena (3,291); Charleston, SC
November 21*; 7:30 pm, SNY		Holy Cross	W 65–53	3–2	Carnesecca Arena (4,030); Queens, NY
November 24*; 7:30 pm		Florida Gulf Coast	W 79–68	4–2	Carnesecca Arena (4,003); Queens, NY
November 29*; 7:30 pm, ESPNU		South Carolina; SEC–Big East Challenge	W 89–65	5–2	Carnesecca Arena (4,902); Queens, NY
December 1*; 1:00 pm		NJIT	W 57–49	6–2	Carnesecca Arena (4,314); Queens, NY
December 4*; 10:00 pm, ESPN3		at San Francisco	L 65–81	6–3	War Memorial Gymnasium (2,200); San Francisco, CA
December 8*; 7:00 pm, MSG+		vs. Fordham; Madison Square Garden Holiday Festival	W 58–47	7–3	Madison Square Garden (10,003); New York City, NY
December 15*; 5:00 pm		vs. St. Francis Brooklyn; Brooklyn Hoops Winter Festival	W 77–60	8–3	Barclays Center (16,514); Brooklyn, NY
December 21*; 7:30 pm		UNC Asheville	L 65–72	8–4	Carnesecca Arena (4,417); Queens, NY
Big East Conference Regular Season
January 2; 8:00 pm, ESPNU		at Villanova	L 86–98 ^{OT}	8–5 (0–1)	The Pavilion (6,500); Villanova, PA
January 5; 4:00 pm, ESPNU		at No. 14 Cincinnati	W 53–52	9–5 (1–1)	Fifth Third Arena (8,142); Cincinnati, OH
January 9; 7:00 pm, MSG		Rutgers	L 56–58	9–6 (1–2)	Madison Square Garden (6,192); New York City, NY
January 12; 11:00 am, ESPN2		No. 19 Georgetown	L 51–67	9–7 (1–3)	Madison Square Garden (11,057); New York City, NY
January 15; 7:00 pm, ESPN2		No. 20 Notre Dame	W 67–63	10–7 (2–3)	Madison Square Garden (7,434); New York City, NY
January 19; 12:00 pm, SNY		at DePaul	W 71–62	11–7 (3–3)	Allstate Arena (7,785); Rosemont, IL
January 23; 7:30 pm, SNY		at Rutgers	W 72–60	12–7 (4–3)	Louis Brown Athletic Center (4,742); Piscataway, NJ
January 27; 12:00 pm, MSG		Seton Hall	W 71–67	13–7 (5–3)	Madison Square Garden (7,641); New York City, NY
January 30; 9:00 pm, ESPNU		DePaul	W 79–74 ^{OT}	14–7 (6–3)	Carnesecca Arena (4,949); Queens, NY
February 2; 4:00 pm, CBS		at Georgetown	L 56–68	14–8 (6–4)	Verizon Center (15,625); Washington, DC
February 6; 7:00 pm, ESPNU		Connecticut	W 71–65	15–8 (7–4)	Madison Square Garden (8,441); New York City, NY
February 10; 3:00 pm, ESPN		at No. 9 Syracuse	L 58–77	15–9 (7–5)	Carrier Dome (27,169); Syracuse, NY
February 14; 9:00 pm, ESPN		at No. 12 Louisville	L 58–72	15–10 (7–6)	KFC Yum! Center (22,086); Louisville, KY
February 20; 7:00 pm, SNY		South Florida	W 69–54	16–10 (8–6)	Carnesecca Arena (5,602); Queens, NY
February 24; 12:00 pm, ESPN3		No. 20 Pittsburgh	L 47–63	16–11 (8–7)	Madison Square Garden (9,129); New York City, NY
March 2; 8:00 pm, SNY		at Providence	L 59–62	16–12 (8–8)	Dunkin' Donuts Center (10,560); Providence, RI
March 5; 7:00 pm, ESPN2		at No. 24 Notre Dame	L 40–66	16–13 (8–9)	Purcell Pavilion (9,149); South Bend, IN
March 9; 2:00 pm, ESPN		No. 15 Marquette	L 67–69 ^{OT}	16–14 (8–10)	Madison Square Garden (12,474); New York City, NY
Big East tournament
March 13; 7:00 pm, ESPN2		vs. Villanova; Second round	L 53–66	16–15	Madison Square Garden (20,057); New York City, NY
NIT
March 19*; 7:00 pm, ESPNU	No. (5)	at (4) Saint Joseph's; First round	W 63–61	17–15	Hagan Arena (3,148); Philadelphia, PA
March 24*; 11:00 am, ESPN	No. (5)	at (1) Virginia; Second round	L 50–68	17–16	John Paul Jones Arena (8,457); Charlottesville, VA
*Non-conference game. ^{#}Rankings from AP Poll. (#) Tournament seedings in parentheses. All times are in Eastern Time.
