= 2012–13 Villanova Wildcats men's basketball team =

American college basketball season

2012–13 Villanova Wildcats men's basketball

NCAA Tournament, round of 64
- Conference: Big East Conference
- Record: 20–14 (10–8 Big East)
- Head coach: Jay Wright
- Assistant coaches: Billy Lange; Raphael Chillious; Baker Dunleavy
- Home arena: The Pavilion; Wells Fargo Center

2012–13 Big East men's basketball standings
	Conf.				Overall
Team	W		L	PCT	W		L	PCT
No. 2 Louisville†**	14	–	4	.778	35	–	5	.875
No. 8 Georgetown	14	–	4	.778	25	–	7	.781
No. 15 Marquette	14	–	4	.778	26	–	9	.743
No. 20 Pittsburgh	12	–	6	.667	24	–	9	.727
No. 16 Syracuse	11	–	7	.611	30	–	10	.750
No. 23 Notre Dame	11	–	7	.611	25	–	10	.714
Villanova	10	–	8	.556	20	–	14	.588
Connecticut*	10	–	8	.556	20	–	10	.667
Cincinnati	9	–	9	.500	22	–	12	.647
Providence	9	–	9	.500	19	–	15	.559
St. John's	8	–	10	.444	17	–	16	.515
Rutgers	5	–	13	.278	15	–	16	.484
Seton Hall	3	–	15	.167	15	–	18	.455
South Florida	3	–	15	.167	12	–	19	.387
DePaul	2	–	16	.111	11	–	21	.344
† 2013 Big East tournament winner As of March 30, 2013; Rankings from AP Poll; *Ineligible for postseason play due to APR penalties.

The 2012–13 Villanova Wildcats men's basketball team represented Villanova University in the 2012–13 NCAA Division I men's basketball season. Villanova was led by head coach Jay Wright, who was in his 12th season. The Wildcats participated in the Big East Conference and played their home games at The Pavilion with some select home games at the Wells Fargo Center. They finished the season 20–14, 10–8 in Big East play to finish in a tie for seventh place. They lost in the quarterfinals of the Big East tournament to Louisville. They received an at large bid to the 2013 NCAA tournament where they lost in the Round of 64 to North Carolina.

This was Villanova's final season as a member of the original Big East Conference. The so-called Catholic 7 schools joined with Butler, Creighton and Xavier to form a new conference that kept the Big East Conference name, but as an entirely new conference.

== Roster ==
2012–13 Villanova Wildcats men's basketball team
Players
Coaches

Pos.	#	Name	Height	Weight	Year	Hometown
G	2	Henry Lowe	5 ft 11 in (1.8 m)	185 lb (84 kg)	Fr	New York, New York
G	3	Tyrone Johnson	6 ft 3 in (1.91 m)	185 lb (84 kg)	So	Plainfield, New Jersey
G	4	Darrun Hilliard	6 ft 6 in (1.98 m)	205 lb (93 kg)	So	Bethlehem, Pennsylvania
G	5	Tony Chennault	6 ft 2 in (1.88 m)	195 lb (88 kg)	Jr	Philadelphia, Pennsylvania
G	10	Mislav Brzoja	6 ft 5 in (1.96 m)	205 lb (93 kg)	Fr	Zagreb, Croatia
G	12	Nick McMahon	6 ft 0 in (1.83 m)	165 lb (75 kg)	Jr	Colts Neck, New Jersey
F/C	13	Mouphtaou Yarou	6 ft 9 in (2.06 m)	215 lb (98 kg)	Sr	Natitingou, Benin
G	15	Ryan Arcidiacono	6 ft 3 in (1.91 m)	180 lb (82 kg)	Fr	Langhorne, Pennsylvania
F	20	Patrick Farrell	6 ft 5 in (1.96 m)	200 lb (91 kg)	Fr	Rockville Centre, New York
F	22	JayVaughn Pinkston	6 ft 7 in (2.01 m)	260 lb (118 kg)	RS So	Brooklyn, New York
F	23	Daniel Ochefu	6 ft 10 in (2.08 m)	230 lb (104 kg)	Fr	Lagos, Nigeria
G	24	Achraf Yacoubou	6 ft 4 in (1.93 m)	210 lb (95 kg)	So	Bronx, New York
C	25	Maurice Sutton	6 ft 11 in (2.11 m)	215 lb (98 kg)	RS Sr	Upper Marlboro, Maryland
G	31	Dylan Ennis	6 ft 2 in (1.88 m)	182 lb (83 kg)	RS Fr	Brampton, Ontario
G	32	James Bell	6 ft 5 in (1.96 m)	225 lb (102 kg)	Jr	Orlando, Florida

Head coach

- Jay Wright (Bucknell)

Assistant coach(es)

- Billy Lange (Rowan)
- Raphael Chillious (Lafayette)
- Baker Dunleavy (Villanova)

Legend

- (C) Team captain
- (S) Suspended
- (I) Ineligible
- (W) Walk-on
- Injured
- Current redshirt

Roster
Last update: 2012-10-30

== Schedule ==
Date time, TV	Rank^{#}	Opponent^{#}	Result	Record	Site (attendance) city, state
Exhibition
11/01/2012*; 7:00 pm		Carleton	W 65–59	–	The Pavilion (N/A); Villanova, PA
Regular season
11/09/2012*; 7:30 pm		District of Columbia; 2K Sports Classic	W 78–58	1–0	The Pavilion (6,500); Villanova, PA
11/11/2012*; 1:00 pm, ESPN3		Marshall; 2K Sports Classic	W 80–68	2–0	The Pavilion (6,500); Villanova, PA
11/15/2012*; 9:30 pm, ESPN2		vs. Purdue; 2K Sports Classic semifinals	W 89–81 ^{OT}	3–0	Madison Square Garden (6,149); New York City, NY
11/16/2012*; 7:00 pm, ESPN2		vs. Alabama; 2K Sports Classic finals	L 55–77	3–1	Madison Square Garden (6,177); New York City, NY
11/20/2012*; 7:00 pm, ESPN3		Columbia	L 57–75	3–2	The Pavilion (6,500); Villanova, PA
11/25/2012*; 1:00 pm, CBSSN		at La Salle	L 74–77 ^{OT}	3–3	Tom Gola Arena (3,091); Philadelphia, PA
12/01/2012*; 5:00 pm, ESPN2		at Vanderbilt	W 62–52	4–3	Memorial Gymnasium (9,365); Nashville, TN
12/05/2012*; 9:00 pm, ESPN2		Temple	L 61–76	4–4	The Pavilion (6,500); Villanova, PA
12/08/2012*; 8:00 pm, NBCSN		at Penn	W 68–55	5–4	Palestra (6,413); Philadelphia, PA
12/11/2012*; 7:00 pm, ESPNU		Saint Joseph's	W 65–61	6–4	The Pavilion (6,500); Villanova, PA
12/16/2012*; 4:00 pm, ESPNU		Delaware	W 75–65	7–4	The Pavilion (6,500); Villanova, PA
12/22/2012*; 7:00 pm, ESPN3		at Monmouth	W 83–56	8–4	Multipurpose Activity Center (3,898); West Long Branch, NJ
12/28/2012*; 7:00 pm, ESPN3		NJIT	W 70–60	9–4	The Pavilion (6,500); Villanova, PA
01/02/2013; 8:00 pm, ESPNU		St. John's	W 98–86 ^{OT}	10–4 (1–0)	The Pavilion (6,500); Villanova, PA
01/09/2013; 8:00 pm, BIG EAST Network/WPHL		at South Florida	W 61–53	11–4 (2–0)	USF Sun Dome (5,014); Tampa, FL
01/12/2013; 12:00 pm, BIG EAST Network/WPHL		at No. 7 Syracuse	L 61–72	11–5 (2–1)	Carrier Dome (27,586); Syracuse, NY
01/16/2013; 7:00 pm, ESPNU		Pittsburgh	L 43–58	11–6 (2–2)	The Pavilion (6,500); Villanova, PA
01/19/2013; 4:00 pm, BIG EAST Network/WPHL		at Providence	L 66–69	11–7 (2–3)	Dunkin' Donuts Center (10,859); Providence, RI
01/22/2013; 8:00 pm, BIG EAST Network/WPHL		No. 5 Louisville	W 73–64	12–7 (3–3)	Wells Fargo Center (11,887); Philadelphia, PA
01/26/2013; 11:00 am, ESPNU		No. 3 Syracuse	W 75–71 ^{OT}	13–7 (4–3)	Wells Fargo Center (18,273); Philadelphia, PA
01/30/2013; 6:00 pm, ESPN2		at Notre Dame	L 60–65	13–8 (4–4)	Joyce Center (8,075); South Bend, IN
02/03/2013; 12:00 pm, BIG EAST Network/WPHL		Providence	L 52–55	13–9 (4–5)	The Pavilion (6,500); Villanova, PA
02/05/2013; 7:00 pm, ESPN2		at DePaul	W 94–71	14–9 (5–5)	Allstate Arena (7,602); Rosemont, IL
02/09/2013; 3:00 pm, ESPNU		South Florida	W 68–40	15–9 (6–5)	The Pavilion (6,500); Villanova, PA
02/12/2013; 8:00 pm, BIG EAST Network/WPHL		at Cincinnati	L 50–68	15–10 (6–6)	Fifth Third Arena (9,534); Cincinnati, OH
02/16/2013; 12:00 pm, ESPN		at Connecticut	W 70–61	16–10 (7–6)	XL Center (15,165); Hartford, CT
02/18/2013; 9:00 pm, ESPNU		Rutgers	W 71–63	17–10 (8–6)	The Pavilion (6,500); Villanova, PA
02/23/2013; 6:00 pm, ESPN/ESPN2		No. 17 Marquette	W 60–56	18–10 (9–6)	The Pavilion (6,500); Villanova, PA
02/25/2013; 9:00 pm, ESPNU		at Seton Hall	L 65–66	18–11 (9–7)	Prudential Center (6,771); Newark, NJ
03/03/2013; 12:00 pm, BIG EAST Network/WPHL		at No. 23 Pittsburgh	L 64–73 ^{OT}	18–12 (9–8)	Peterson Events Center (12,553); Pittsburgh, PA
03/06/2013; 7:00 pm, ESPN2		No. 5 Georgetown	W 67–57	19–12 (10–8)	Wells Fargo Center (13,685); Philadelphia, PA
2013 Big East men's basketball tournament
03/13/2013; 7:00 pm, ESPN2		vs. St. John's; Second Round	W 66–53	20–12	Madison Square Garden (20,057); New York City, NY
03/14/2013; 7:00 pm, ESPN		vs. No. 4 Louisville; Quarterfinals	L 55–74	20–13	Madison Square Garden (20,057); New York City, NY
2013 NCAA tournament
03/22/2013*; 7:20 pm, TNT	No. (9 S)	vs. (8 S) North Carolina; Second Round	L 71–78	20–14	Sprint Center (18,488); Kansas City, MO
*Non-conference game. ^{#}Rankings from AP Poll. (#) Tournament seedings in parentheses. All times are in Eastern Time. (#) during NCAA Tournament is seed with Region S=South.
