= 2012–13 Rutgers Scarlet Knights men's basketball team =

American college basketball season

2012–13 Rutgers Scarlet Knights men's basketball
- Conference: Big East Conference (1979–2013)
- Record: 15–16 (5–13 Big East)
- Head coach: Mike Rice Jr.
- Assistant coaches: David Cox; Van Macon; Jimmy Martelli
- Home arena: Louis Brown Athletic Center

2012–13 Big East men's basketball standings
	Conf.				Overall
Team	W		L	PCT	W		L	PCT
No. 2 Louisville†**	14	–	4	.778	35	–	5	.875
No. 8 Georgetown	14	–	4	.778	25	–	7	.781
No. 15 Marquette	14	–	4	.778	26	–	9	.743
No. 20 Pittsburgh	12	–	6	.667	24	–	9	.727
No. 16 Syracuse	11	–	7	.611	30	–	10	.750
No. 23 Notre Dame	11	–	7	.611	25	–	10	.714
Villanova	10	–	8	.556	20	–	14	.588
Connecticut*	10	–	8	.556	20	–	10	.667
Cincinnati	9	–	9	.500	22	–	12	.647
Providence	9	–	9	.500	19	–	15	.559
St. John's	8	–	10	.444	17	–	16	.515
Rutgers	5	–	13	.278	15	–	16	.484
Seton Hall	3	–	15	.167	15	–	18	.455
South Florida	3	–	15	.167	12	–	19	.387
DePaul	2	–	16	.111	11	–	21	.344
† 2013 Big East tournament winner As of March 30, 2013; Rankings from AP Poll; *Ineligible for postseason play due to APR penalties.

The 2012–13 Rutgers Scarlet Knights men's basketball team represented Rutgers University during the 2012–13 NCAA Division I men's basketball season. The Scarlet Knights, led by third year head coach Mike Rice Jr., played their home games at the Louis Brown Athletic Center, better known as The RAC, and were members of the Big East Conference. They finished the season 15–16, 5–13 in Big East play to finish in 12th place. They lost in the second round of the Big East tournament to Notre Dame.

This was their last year as a member of the Big East Conference. The so-called Catholic 7 members of the Big East will separate themselves from the conference, along with Butler, Creighton and Xavier, to form a new conference that retains the Big East Conference name. In 2013–14, Rutgers will be part of the American Athletic Conference. They will only play in the AAC for one season as they will join the Big Ten Conference in 2014–15.

Head coach Mike Rice Jr. was fired April 3, 2013. Assistant coach Jimmy Martelli resigned on April 4, 2013.

== Roster ==
Number	Name	Position	Height	Weight	Year	Hometown
1	Jerome Seagears	Guard	6–1	175	Senior	Silver Spring, Maryland
2	Dane Miller	Guard/Forward	6–6	215	Senior	Rochester, New York
4	Myles Mack	Guard	5–9	170	Sophomore	Paterson, New Jersey
5	Eli Carter	Guard	6–2	195	Sophomore	Paterson, New Jersey
10	Mike Poole	Guard/Forward	6–5	195	Junior	Rosedale, New York
13	Malick Kone	Guard/Forward	6–5	200	Sophomore	Conakry, Guinea
15	Derrick Randall	Forward/Center	6–8	240	Sophomore	Brooklyn, New York
21	Austin Johnson	Forward	6–8	250	Senior	Elkins Park, Pennsylvania
22	Kadeem Jack	Forward	6–9	225	Sophomore	Queens, New York
24	Vincent Garrett	Guard/Forward	6–5	210	Junior	Chicago, Illinois
30	Logan Kelley	Guard	6–2	200	Freshman	Mountainside, New Jersey
33	Wally Judge	Forward	6–9	250	Junior	Washington, D.C.
35	Greg Lewis	Forward	6–9	240	Sophomore	Randallstown, Maryland

== Schedule ==
Date time, TV	Opponent	Result	Record	Site (attendance) city, state
Exhibition
11/04/2012*; 1:00 pm	Holy Family	W 92–52		The RAC (1,052); Piscataway, NJ
Regular season
11/09/2012*; 7:30 pm, SNY	Saint Peter's	L 52–56	0–1	The RAC (3,906); Piscataway, NJ
11/12/2012*; 7:30 pm	Sacred Heart	W 88–62	1–1	The RAC (2,768); Piscataway, NJ
11/16/2012*; 7:00 pm	at Princeton; Rivalry	W 58–52	2–1	Jadwin Gymnasium (3,150); Princeton, NJ
11/20/2012*; 7:30 pm, ESPN3	Boston University	W 81–79	3–1	The RAC (4,382); Piscataway, NJ
11/25/2012*; 2:00 pm	at UNC Greensboro	W 87–80	4–1	Greensboro Coliseum (1,793); Greensboro, NC
12/01/2012*; 2:00 pm, ESPNU	at Ole Miss; SEC–Big East Challenge	L 67–80	4–2	Tad Smith Coliseum (4,277); Oxford, MS
12/08/2012*; 9:30 pm, MSG2	vs. Iona; Holiday Festival	W 81–73	5–2	Madison Square Garden (10,003); New York City, NY
12/11/2012*; 7:30 pm, SNY/ESPN3	George Washington	W 68–65	6–2	The RAC (4,385); Piscataway, NJ
12/16/2012*; 12:00 pm	UAB	W 88–79	7–2	The RAC (4,679); Piscataway, NJ
12/21/2012*; 7:30 pm	Howard	W 79–55	8–2	The RAC (5,924); Piscataway, NJ
12/28/2012*; 3:00 pm	Rider	W 68–56	9–2	The RAC (4,568); Piscataway, NJ
01/02/2013; 7:00 pm, MSG/ESPN3	at No. 7 Syracuse	L 53–78	9–3 (0–1)	Carrier Dome (17,413); Syracuse, NY
01/05/2013; 11:00 am, ESPN2	No. 24 Pittsburgh	W 67–62	10–3 (1–1)	The RAC (5,081); Piscataway, NJ
01/09/2013; 7:00 pm, MSG/ESPN3	at St. John's	W 58–56	11–3 (2–1)	Madison Square Garden (6,192); New York City, NY
01/12/2013; 8:00 pm, SNY/ESPN3	No. 21 Cincinnati	L 58–68	11–4 (2–2)	The RAC (5,560); Piscataway, NJ
01/17/2013; 9:00 pm, ESPN2	South Florida	W 70–67	12–4 (3–2)	The RAC (4,205); Piscataway, NJ
01/19/2013; 8:00 pm, SNY/ESPN3	at No. 20 Notre Dame	L 66–69	12–5 (3–3)	Edmund P. Joyce Center (9,149); Notre Dame, IN
01/23/2013; 7:30 pm, SNY/ESPN3	St. John's	L 60–72	12–6 (3–4)	The RAC (4,742); Piscataway, NJ
01/27/2013; 2:00 pm, SNY/ESPN3	at Connecticut	L 54–66	12–7 (3–5)	XL Center (12,768); Hartford, CT
01/30/2013; 7:00 pm, SNY/ESPN3	at No. 24 Cincinnati	L 54–62	12–8 (3–6)	Fifth Third Arena (11,024); Cincinnati, OH
02/06/2013; 7:30 pm, MSG+/ESPN3	No. 11 Louisville	L 48–68	12–9 (3–7)	The RAC (5,862); Piscataway, NJ
02/09/2013; 12:00 pm, SNY/ESPN3	No. 20 Georgetown	L 63–69	12–10 (3–8)	The RAC (6,335); Piscataway, NJ
02/12/2013; 7:00 pm, ESPN2	Seton Hall; Rivalry	W 57–55	13–10 (4–8)	The RAC (5,803); Piscataway, NJ
02/16/2013; 1:00 pm, ESPNU	at DePaul	L 69–75	13–11 (4–9)	Allstate Arena (8,520); Rosemont, IL
02/18/2013; 9:00 pm, ESPNU	at Villanova	L 63–71	13–12 (4–10)	The Pavilion (6,500); Villanova, PA
02/23/2013; 9:00 pm, ESPNU	Providence	L 72–76	13–13 (4–11)	The RAC (5,533); Piscataway, NJ
03/02/2013; 9:00 pm, ESPNU	at No. 7 Georgetown	L 51–64	13–14 (4–12)	Verizon Center (12,931); Washington, D.C.
03/05/2013; 7:00 pm, SNY/ESPN3	No. 15 Marquette	L 54–60	13–15 (4–13)	The RAC (5,021); Piscataway, NJ
03/08/2013; 7:00 pm, SNY/ESPN3	at Seton Hall; Rivalry	W 56–51	14–15 (5–13)	Prudential Center (8,708); Newark, NJ
Big East tournament
03/12/2013; 9:38 pm, ESPNU	vs. DePaul; First Round	W 76–57	15–15	Madison Square Garden (20,057); New York City, NY
03/13/2013; 9:45 pm, ESPN2	vs. No. 24 Notre Dame; Second Round	L 61–69	15–16	Madison Square Garden (20,057); New York City, NY
*Non-conference game. ^{#}Rankings from AP Poll. (#) Tournament seedings in parentheses. All times are in Eastern Time.
