= 2012–13 DePaul Blue Demons men's basketball team =

American college basketball season

2012–13 DePaul Blue Demons men's basketball
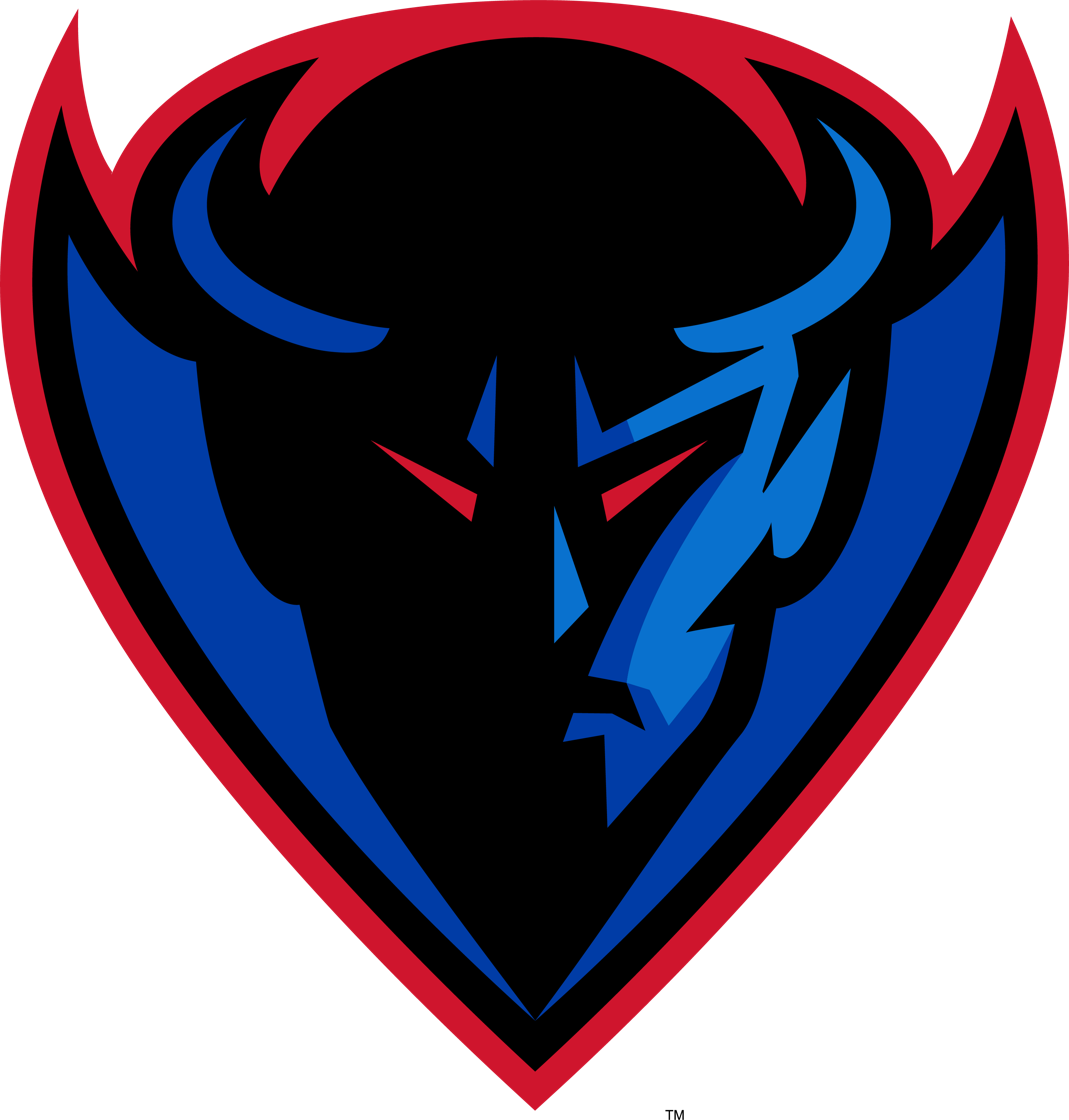
- Conference: Big East Conference (1979–2013)
- Record: 11–21 (2–16 Big East)
- Head coach: Oliver Purnell (3rd season)
- Assistant coaches: Ron Bradley; Brian Ellerbe; Billy Garrett
- Home arena: Allstate Arena; McGrath-Phillips Arena

2012–13 Big East men's basketball standings
	Conf.				Overall
Team	W		L	PCT	W		L	PCT
No. 2 Louisville†**	14	–	4	.778	35	–	5	.875
No. 8 Georgetown	14	–	4	.778	25	–	7	.781
No. 15 Marquette	14	–	4	.778	26	–	9	.743
No. 20 Pittsburgh	12	–	6	.667	24	–	9	.727
No. 16 Syracuse	11	–	7	.611	30	–	10	.750
No. 23 Notre Dame	11	–	7	.611	25	–	10	.714
Villanova	10	–	8	.556	20	–	14	.588
Connecticut*	10	–	8	.556	20	–	10	.667
Cincinnati	9	–	9	.500	22	–	12	.647
Providence	9	–	9	.500	19	–	15	.559
St. John's	8	–	10	.444	17	–	16	.515
Rutgers	5	–	13	.278	15	–	16	.484
Seton Hall	3	–	15	.167	15	–	18	.455
South Florida	3	–	15	.167	12	–	19	.387
DePaul	2	–	16	.111	11	–	21	.344
† 2013 Big East tournament winner As of March 30, 2013; Rankings from AP Poll; *Ineligible for postseason play due to APR penalties.

The 2012–13 DePaul Blue Demons men's basketball team represented DePaul University during the 2012–13 NCAA Division I men's basketball season. The Blue Demons, led by third year head coach Oliver Purnell, played their home games at the Allstate Arena, with two home games at McGrath-Phillips Arena, and were members of the Big East Conference. They finished the season 11–21, 2–16 in Big East play to finish in last place. They lost in the first round of the Big East tournament to Rutgers.

This was DePaul's final season as a member of the original Big East Conference (now known as the American Athletic Conference or The American). The so-called Catholic 7 schools will join with Butler, Creighton and Xavier to form a new conference that will keep the Big East Conference name but will be an entirely new conference.

== Roster ==
Number	Name	Position	Height	Weight	Year	Hometown
0	Worrel Clahar	Guard	6-0	186	Senior	Brooklyn, New York
1	DeJuan Marrero	Forward	6–5	208	Freshman	Gary, Indiana
2	Edwind McGhee	Guard	6–3	202	Junior	Champaign, Illinois
3	Jodan Price	Guard/Forward	6–7	170	Freshman	Indianapolis, Indiana
10	Darrell Robertson Jr.	Center	6–10	247	Sophomore	Pinola, Mississippi
12	Cleveland Melvin	Forward	6–8	208	Junior	Baltimore, Maryland
13	Cory Dolins	Guard	6–0	179	Freshman	Skokie, Illinois
15	Moses Morgan	Forward	6–6	223	Junior	Las Vegas, Nevada
20	Brandon Young	Guard	6–4	199	Junior	Baltimore, Maryland
21	Jamee Crockett	Forward	6–4	213	Sophomore	Chicago, Illinois
23	Donnavan Kirk	Forward	6–9	223	Junior	Pontiac, Michigan
25	Durrell McDonald	Guard	6–1	171	Freshman	Las Vegas, Nevada
30	Peter Ryckbosch	Forward	6–9	224	Freshman	Chicago, Illinois
32	Charles McKinney	Guard	6–3	183	Sophomore	Evanston, Illinois
34	Stuart Pirri	Forward	6–8	188	Senior	Metairie, Louisiana
35	Montray Clemons	Forward	6–7	235	Freshman	Baltimore, Maryland

== Schedule ==
Date time, TV	Opponent	Result	Record	Site (attendance) city, state
Exhibition
11/03/2012*; 7:30 pm	Lewis	W 91–74	–	McGrath-Phillips Arena (2,767); Chicago, IL
Regular season
11/09/2012*; 8:00 pm	UC Riverside	W 91–59	1–0	McGrath-Phillips Arena (3,554); Chicago, IL
11/15/2012*; 7:30 pm	Gardner–Webb; Cancún Challenge	L 59–71	1–1	Allstate Arena (7,001); Rosemont, IL
11/17/2012*; 1:00 pm	Austin Peay; Cancún Challenge	W 98–67	2–1	Allstate Arena (7,398); Rosemont, IL
11/20/2012*; 6:00 pm, CBSSN	vs. Wichita State; Cancún Challenge semifinals	L 62–75	2–2	Moon Palace Resort (902); Cancún, Mexico
11/21/2012*; 6:00 pm, CBSSN	vs. Western Kentucky; Cancún Challenge	L 61–70	2–3	Moon Palace Resort (902); Cancún, Mexico
11/27/2012*; 8:00 pm, WCIU/ESPN3	Fairfield	W 85–78	3–3	Allstate Arena (7,017); Rosemont, IL
11/30/2012*; 8:00 pm, ESPNU	at Auburn; SEC–Big East Challenge	W 80–76	4–3	Auburn Arena (5,827); Auburn, AL
12/05/2012*; 7:00 pm, LPTV/ESPN3	at Chicago State	W 74–64	5–3	Emil and Patricia Jones Convocation Center (2,691); Chicago, IL
12/09/2012*; 4:00 pm	Milwaukee	W 84–50	6–3	Allstate Arena (7,025); Rosemont, IL
12/12/2012*; 8:00 pm, P12N	at Arizona State	W 78–61	7–3	Wells Fargo Arena (5,401); Tempe, AZ
12/16/2012*; 4:00 pm	Northern Illinois	W 69–64	8–3	Allstate Arena (7,155); Rosemont, IL
12/22/2012*; 1:00 pm, WCIU/ESPN3	UMBC	W 69–61	9–3	Allstate Arena (7,054); Rosemont, IL
12/29/2012*; 1:00 pm, WCIU/ESPN3	Loyola–Chicago	L 61–69	9–4	Allstate Arena (8,020); Rosemont, IL
01/02/2013; 8:00 pm, Big East Network/WCIU/ESPN3	Seton Hall	L 72–73	9–5 (0–1)	Allstate Arena (7,189); Rosemont, IL
01/05/2013; 7:00 pm, Big East Network/WCIU/ESPN3	at Providence	W 83–73	10–5 (1–1)	Dunkin' Donuts Center (6,853); Providence, RI
01/08/2013; 6:00 pm, Big East Network/WCIU/ESPN3	at Connecticut	L 78–99	10–6 (1–2)	Gampel Pavilion (9,156); Storrs, CT
01/15/2013; 7:30 pm, Big East Network/WCIU/ESPN3	Cincinnati	L 70–75	10–7 (1–3)	Allstate Arena (8,120); Rosemont, IL
01/19/2013; 11:00 am, Big East Network/WCIU/ESPN3	St. John's	L 62–71	10–8 (1–4)	Allstate Arena (7,785); Rosemont, IL
01/26/2013; 3:00 pm, Big East Network/WCIU/ESPN3	at Pittsburgh	L 55–93	10–9 (1–5)	Petersen Events Center (12,512); Pittsburgh, PA
01/30/2013; 8:00 pm, ESPNU	at St. John's	L 74–79 ^{OT}	10–10 (1–6)	Carnesecca Arena (4,949); Queens, NY
02/02/2013; 1:00 pm, ESPN2	Notre Dame	L 71–79 ^{OT}	10–11 (1–7)	Allstate Arena (11,354); Rosemont, IL
02/05/2013; 6:00 pm, ESPN2	Villanova	L 71–94	10–12 (1–8)	Allstate Arena (7,602); Rosemont, IL
02/09/2013; 1:00 pm, Big East Network/WCIU/ESPN3	at No. 24 Marquette	L 78–89	10–13 (1–9)	Bradley Center (16,176); Milwaukee, WI
02/13/2013; 6:00 pm, Big East Network/WCIU/ESPN3	at No. 21 Notre Dame	L 78–82 ^{OT}	10–14 (1–10)	Edmund P. Joyce Center (8,554); Notre Dame, IN
02/16/2013; 12:00 pm, ESPNU	Rutgers	W 75–69	11–14 (2–10)	Allstate Arena (8,520); Rosemont, IL
02/20/2013; 6:00 pm, Big East Network/WCIU/ESPN3	at No. 11 Georgetown	L 66–90	11–15 (2–11)	Verizon Center (9,987); Washington, D.C.
02/23/2013; 7:00 pm, Big East Network/WCIU/ESPN3	Connecticut	L 69–81	11–16 (2–12)	Allstate Arena (8,662); Rosemont, IL
02/27/2013; 8:00 pm, ESPNU	No. 10 Louisville	L 58–79	11–17 (2–13)	Allstate Arena (8,654); Rosemont, IL
03/03/2013; 1:00 pm, Big East Network/WCIU/ESPN3	at South Florida	L 73–83	11–18 (2–14)	USF Sun Dome (5,383); Tampa, FL
03/06/2013; 5:00 pm, Big East Network/WCIU/ESPN3	at No. 17 Syracuse	L 57–78	11–19 (2–15)	Carrier Dome (23,380); Syracuse, NY
03/09/2013; 1:00 pm, Big East Network/WCIU	No. 20 Pittsburgh	L 66–81	11–20 (2–16)	Allstate Arena (8,454); Rosemont, IL
2013 Big East men's basketball tournament
03/12/2013; 8:38 pm, ESPNU	vs. Rutgers; First Round	L 57–76	11–21	Madison Square Garden (20,057); New York City, NY
*Non-conference game. ^{#}Rankings from AP Poll. (#) Tournament seedings in parentheses. All times are in Central Time.
