= 2012–13 Providence Friars men's basketball team =

American college basketball season

2012–13 Providence Friars men's basketball
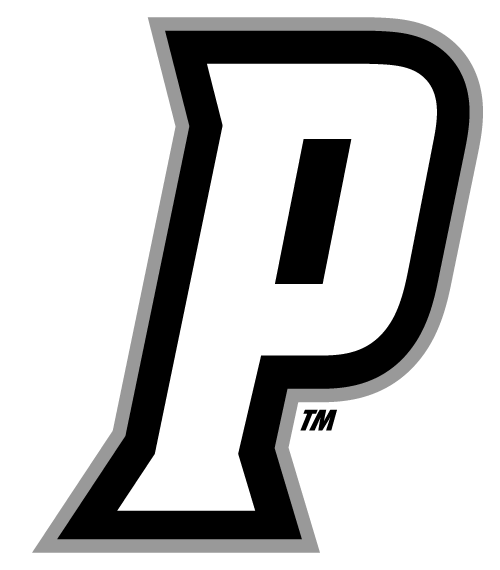

NIT, #4, Quarterfinals
- Conference: Big East Conference (1979–2013)
- Record: 19–15 (9–9 Big East)
- Head coach: Ed Cooley
- Assistant coaches: Andre LaFleur; Bob Simon; Brian Blaney
- MVP: Bryce Cotton
- Home arena: Dunkin' Donuts Center

2012–13 Big East men's basketball standings
	Conf.				Overall
Team	W		L	PCT	W		L	PCT
No. 2 Louisville†**	14	–	4	.778	35	–	5	.875
No. 8 Georgetown	14	–	4	.778	25	–	7	.781
No. 15 Marquette	14	–	4	.778	26	–	9	.743
No. 20 Pittsburgh	12	–	6	.667	24	–	9	.727
No. 16 Syracuse	11	–	7	.611	30	–	10	.750
No. 23 Notre Dame	11	–	7	.611	25	–	10	.714
Villanova	10	–	8	.556	20	–	14	.588
Connecticut*	10	–	8	.556	20	–	10	.667
Cincinnati	9	–	9	.500	22	–	12	.647
Providence	9	–	9	.500	19	–	15	.559
St. John's	8	–	10	.444	17	–	16	.515
Rutgers	5	–	13	.278	15	–	16	.484
Seton Hall	3	–	15	.167	15	–	18	.455
South Florida	3	–	15	.167	12	–	19	.387
DePaul	2	–	16	.111	11	–	21	.344
† 2013 Big East tournament winner As of March 30, 2013; Rankings from AP Poll; *Ineligible for postseason play due to APR penalties.

The 2012–13 Providence Friars men's basketball team represented Providence College during the 2012–13 NCAA Division I men's basketball season. The Friars, led by second-year head coach Ed Cooley, played their home games at the Dunkin' Donuts Center and were members of the Big East Conference. The Friars finished the season 19–15, 9–9 in Big East play to finish in a tie for ninth place. They lost to Cincinnati in the second round of the Big East tournament. The Friars received an at-large bid to the National Invitation Tournament where they defeated Charlotte and Robert Morris to advance to the NIT quarterfinals. There they lost to the eventual NIT champions, Baylor.

== Previous season ==
The Friars finished the 2011–12 season 15–7, 4–14 in Big East play to finish in 16th place. They lost to Seton Hall in the first round of the Big East tournament.

== Offseason ==
=== Incoming recruits ===
College recruiting
Name	Hometown	School	Height	Weight	Commit date
Ian Baker; PG	Washington, D.C.	Arlington Country Day School	6 ft 2 in (1.88 m)	180 lb (82 kg)	Mar 30, 2012
Ian Baker; PG	Recruit ratings: Scout: Rivals: (87)				
Kris Dunn; PG	New London, CT	New London HS	6 ft 3 in (1.91 m)	180 lb (82 kg)	Aug 24, 2011
Kris Dunn; PG	Recruit ratings: Scout: Rivals: (96)				
Josh Fortune; SG	Hampton, VA	Kecoughtan HS	6 ft 5 in (1.96 m)	180 lb (82 kg)	Aug 26, 2010
Josh Fortune; SG	Recruit ratings: Scout: Rivals: (89)				
Ricardo Ledo; SG	Providence, RI	Notre Dame Prep	6 ft 6 in (1.98 m)	180 lb (82 kg)	Sep 5, 2011
Ricardo Ledo; SG	Recruit ratings: Scout: Rivals: (96)				
Overall recruit ranking: Scout: #10 Rivals: #8 ESPN: #6
Note: In many cases, Scout, Rivals, 247Sports, On3, and ESPN may conflict in their listings of height and weight.; In these cases, the average was taken. ESPN grades are on a 100-point scale.; Sources: "2012 Providence Signees". Rivals.; "2012 Providence Signees". Scout.; "2012 Providence Signees". ESPN.; "Scout.com Team Recruiting Rankings". Scout.; "2012 Team Ranking". Rivals.

=== Class of 2013 recruits ===
College recruiting
Name	Hometown	School	Height	Weight	Commit date
Brandon Austin; SF	Philadelphia, PA	Imhotep Institute Charter HS	6 ft 6 in (1.98 m)	180 lb (82 kg)	Nov 19, 2012
Brandon Austin; SF	Recruit ratings: Scout: Rivals: (87)				
Rodney Bullock; SF	Hampton, VA	Kecoughtan HS	6 ft 7 in (2.01 m)	185 lb (84 kg)	Oct 3, 2012
Rodney Bullock; SF	Recruit ratings: Scout: Rivals: (77)				
Overall recruit ranking:
Note: In many cases, Scout, Rivals, 247Sports, On3, and ESPN may conflict in their listings of height and weight.; In these cases, the average was taken. ESPN grades are on a 100-point scale.; Sources: "2013 Providence Signees". Rivals.; "2013 Providence Signees". Scout.; "2013 Providence Signees". ESPN.; "Scout.com Team Recruiting Rankings". Scout.; "2013 Team Ranking". Rivals.

== Roster ==
2012–13 Providence Friars men's basketball team
Players
Coaches

Pos.	#	Name	Height	Weight	Year	Previous school	Hometown
G	1	Ricky Ledo (I)	6 ft 7 in (2.01 m)	195 lb (88 kg)	Fr	South Kent School	Providence, Rhode Island
G	3	Kris Dunn	6 ft 3 in (1.91 m)	180 lb (82 kg)	Fr	New London High School	New London, Connecticut
G	4	Josh Fortune	6 ft 5 in (1.96 m)	195 lb (88 kg)	Fr	Kecoughtan High School	Hampton, Virginia
F	5	Sidiki Johnson	6 ft 10 in (2.08 m)	240 lb (109 kg)	So	Wadleigh High School	Harlem, New York
F	10	Kadeem Batts	6 ft 9 in (2.06 m)	245 lb (111 kg)	RS Jr	McEachern High School	Powder Springs, Georgia
G	11	Bryce Cotton	6 ft 1 in (1.85 m)	165 lb (75 kg)	Jr	Palo Verde High School	Tucson, Arizona
F	13	Brice Kofane	6 ft 8 in (2.03 m)	205 lb (93 kg)	RS So	The Miller School	Yaoundé, Cameroon
F	21	Lee Goldsbrough	6 ft 9 in (2.06 m)	225 lb (102 kg)	Jr	Loreto College	Newcastle, England
G	22	Ted Bancroft (W)	6 ft 5 in (1.96 m)	200 lb (91 kg)	Jr	Bishop Stang High School	Marion, Massachusetts
F	23	LaDontae Henton	6 ft 6 in (1.98 m)	215 lb (98 kg)	So	Eastern High School	Lansing, Michigan
F	25	Tyler Harris (I)	6 ft 9 in (2.06 m)	215 lb (98 kg)	So	St. Benedict's Prep	Dix Hills, New York
G	32	Vincent Council	6 ft 2 in (1.88 m)	180 lb (82 kg)	Sr	The Patterson School	Brooklyn, New York
F	33	Carson Desrosiers (I)	7 ft 0 in (2.13 m)	250 lb (113 kg)	Jr	Central Catholic High School	Windham, New Hampshire

Head coach

Ed Cooley

Assistant coach(es)

Andre LaFleur
Bob Simon
Brian Blaney

Legend

- (C) Team captain
- (S) Suspended
- (I) Ineligible
- (W) Walk-on
- Injured
- Current redshirt

Roster
Last update: October 10, 2012

=== Depth chart ===
Pos.	Starting 5	Bench 1	Bench 2	Bench 3
F/C	Kadeem Batts	Lee Goldsbrough	Brice Kofane	(Sidiki Johnson)
F	LaDontae Henton
G/F	Kris Dunn	Ted Bancroft (W)
G	Bryce Cotton	Josh Fortune
PG	Vincent Council

== Schedule ==
Date time, TV	Rank^{#}	Opponent^{#}	Result	Record	Site city, state
Exhibition games
October 27*; 2:00 pm		Assumption (D-II)	W 88–45		Alumni Hall; Providence, RI
November 3*; 7:00 pm, Cox Sports		Rhode Island College (D-III)	W 76–52		Dunkin' Donuts Center; Providence, RI
Non-conference games
November 10*; 2:00 pm		NJIT	W 64–63	1–0	Dunkin' Donuts Center; Providence, RI
November 12*; 7:00 pm, Cox Sports		Bryant	W 81–49	2–0	Dunkin' Donuts Center; Providence, RI
November 15*; 7:30 pm, ESPNU		vs. Massachusetts; Puerto Rico Tip-Off First Round	L 75–77	2–1	Coliseo Rubén Rodríguez; Bayamón, Puerto Rico
November 16*; 7:30 pm, ESPN3		vs. Penn State; Puerto Rico Tip-Off consolation	L 52–55 ^{OT}	2–2	Coliseo Rubén Rodríguez; Bayamón, Puerto Rico
November 18*; 11:00 am, ESPNU		vs. UNC Asheville; Puerto Rico Tip-Off 7th place game	W 72–67	3–2	Coliseo Rubén Rodríguez; Bayamón, Puerto Rico
November 23*; 7:00 pm		Fairfield; Homecoming	W 66–47	4–2	Dunkin' Donuts Center; Providence, RI
November 27*; 7:00 pm, Cox Sports		Holy Cross; Homecoming	W 61–42	5–2	Dunkin' Donuts Center; Providence, RI
December 1*; 12:00 pm, ESPNU		Mississippi State; SEC–Big East Challenge	W 73–63	6–2	Dunkin' Donuts Center; Providence, RI
December 6*; 7:00 pm, Cox Sports		Rhode Island	W 72–57	7–2	Dunkin' Donuts Center; Providence, RI
December 18*; 7:00 pm		Colgate	W 79–45	8–2	Dunkin' Donuts Center; Providence, RI
December 22*; 2:00 pm, ESPN3		at Boston College	L 68–71	8–3	Conte Forum; Chestnut Hill, MA
December 28*; 7:00 pm, NBC Sports		at Brown	L 68–69	8–4	Paul Bailey Pizzitola Memorial Sports Center; Providence, RI
Big East regular season
January 2; 6:00 pm, Cox Sports/SNY		at No. 4 Louisville	L 62–80	8–5 (0–1)	KFC Yum! Center; Louisville, KY
January 5; 8:00 pm, Cox Sports/SNY		DePaul	L 73–83	8–6 (0–2)	Dunkin' Donuts Center; Providence, RI
January 9; 7:00 pm, Cox Sports/SNY		No. 7 Syracuse	L 66–72	8–7 (0–3)	Dunkin' Donuts Center; Providence, RI
January 13; 12:00 pm, Cox Sports/SNY		at Seton Hall	W 67–55	9–7 (1–3)	Prudential Center; Newark, NJ
January 16; 7:00 pm, Cox Sports/SNY		at Georgetown	L 65–74	9–8 (1–4)	Verizon Center; Washington, D.C.
January 19; 4:00 pm, Cox Sports/MSG		Villanova	W 69–66	10–8 (2–4)	Dunkin' Donuts Center; Providence, RI
January 22; 7:00 pm, ESPN2		Pittsburgh	L 64–68	10–9 (2–5)	Dunkin' Donuts Center; Providence, RI
January 26; 2:00 pm, Cox Sports/MSG		at Marquette	L 71–81	10–10 (2–6)	BMO Harris Bradley Center; Milwaukee, WI
January 31; 7:00 pm, ESPN2		Connecticut	L 79–82 ^{OT}	10–11 (2–7)	Dunkin' Donuts Center; Providence, RI
February 3; 12:00 pm, Cox Sports/SNY		at Villanova	W 55–52	11–11 (3–7)	The Pavilion; Villanova, PA
February 6; 7:00 pm, Cox Sports/SNY		No. 17 Cincinnati	W 54–50	12–11 (4–7)	Dunkin' Donuts Center; Providence, RI
February 13; 9:00 pm, ESPNU		at South Florida	W 76–66	13–11 (5–7)	USF Sun Dome; Tampa, FL
February 16; 12:00 pm, Cox Sports/SNY		No. 21 Notre Dame	W 71–54	14–11 (6–7)	Dunkin' Donuts Center; Providence, RI
February 20; 7:00 pm, ESPN2		at No. 8 Syracuse	L 59–84	14–12 (6–8)	Carrier Dome; Syracuse, NY
February 23; 9:00 pm, ESPNU		at Rutgers	W 76–72	15–12 (7–8)	Louis Brown Athletic Center; Piscataway, NJ
March 2; 8:00 pm, Cox Sports/SNY		St. John's	W 62–59	16–12 (8–8)	Dunkin' Donuts Center; Providence, RI
March 5; 9:00 pm, Cox Sports/SNY		Seton Hall	W 76–66	17–12 (9–8)	Dunkin' Donuts Center; Providence, RI
March 9; 12:00 pm, ESPNU		at Connecticut	L 59–63 ^{OT}	17–13 (9–9)	Gampel Pavilion; Storrs, CT
Big East tournament
March 13; 12:00 pm, ESPN		vs. Cincinnati; Second Round	L 44–61	17–14 (9–9)	Madison Square Garden; New York, NY
NIT
March 20*; 7:15 pm, ESPN3	No. 4	No. 5 Charlotte; First Round	W 75–66	18–14 (9–9)	Dunkin' Donuts Center; Providence, RI
March 25*; 7:00 pm, ESPNews	No. 4	No. 8 Robert Morris; Second Round	W 77–68	19–14 (9–9)	Dunkin' Donuts Center; Providence, RI
March 27*; 9:00 pm, ESPN2	No. 4	at No. 2 Baylor; Quarterfinals	L 68–79	19–15 (9–9)	Ferrell Center; Waco, TX
*Non-conference game. ^{#}Rankings from AP Poll. (#) Tournament seedings in parentheses. All times are in Eastern Time.

== Awards and honors ==
Recipient	Award(s)
Ted Bancroft	2013 Co-Lenny Wilkens Hustle Award
Kadeem Batts	2013 Big East Co-Most Improved Player Award; 2013 All-Big East Honorable Mention; 2013 USBWA All-District 1; 2013 Marvin Barnes Co-Defensive Player Award; 2013 Ryan Gomes Most Improved Player Award; February 11: Big East Player of the Week
Bryce Cotton	2013 All-Big East First Team; 2013 USBWA All-District 1; 2013 NABC Division I All-District 5 Second Team; 2013 Jimmy Walker Most Valuable Player Award; 2013 Thomas Ramos Academic Award
Vincent Council	2013 John Zannini Coaches' Award; 2012 Preseason All-Big East First Team; 2013 John R. Wooden Award Preseason Top 50 Candidate
Kris Dunn	2013 Co-Marvin Barnes Defensive Player Award; 2013 Coca-Cola Most Promising Prospect Award
Lee Goldsbrough	2013 Co-Lenny Wilkens Hustle Award
LaDontae Henton	2013 Top Rebounder Award
