= 2012–13 South Florida Bulls men's basketball team =

American college basketball season

2012–13 South Florida Bulls men's basketball
- Conference: Big East Conference (1979–2013)
- Record: 12–19 (3–15 Big East)
- Head coach: Stan Heath
- Assistant coaches: Andy Hipsher; Steve Roccaforte; Eric Skeeters
- Home arena: USF Sun Dome

2012–13 Big East men's basketball standings
	Conf.				Overall
Team	W		L	PCT	W		L	PCT
No. 2 Louisville†**	14	–	4	.778	35	–	5	.875
No. 8 Georgetown	14	–	4	.778	25	–	7	.781
No. 15 Marquette	14	–	4	.778	26	–	9	.743
No. 20 Pittsburgh	12	–	6	.667	24	–	9	.727
No. 16 Syracuse	11	–	7	.611	30	–	10	.750
No. 23 Notre Dame	11	–	7	.611	25	–	10	.714
Villanova	10	–	8	.556	20	–	14	.588
Connecticut*	10	–	8	.556	20	–	10	.667
Cincinnati	9	–	9	.500	22	–	12	.647
Providence	9	–	9	.500	19	–	15	.559
St. John's	8	–	10	.444	17	–	16	.515
Rutgers	5	–	13	.278	15	–	16	.484
Seton Hall	3	–	15	.167	15	–	18	.455
South Florida	3	–	15	.167	12	–	19	.387
DePaul	2	–	16	.111	11	–	21	.344
† 2013 Big East tournament winner As of March 30, 2013; Rankings from AP Poll; *Ineligible for postseason play due to APR penalties.

The 2012–13 South Florida Bulls men's basketball team represented the University of South Florida Bulls during the 2012–13 NCAA Division I men's basketball season. This was the 42nd season of basketball for USF and its 8th season as a member of the Big East Conference. The team was coached by Stan Heath in his sixth year at the school. USF played its home games at the newly renovated USF Sun Dome. They finished the season 12–19, 3–15 in Big East play to finish in a tie for 13th place. They lost in the first round of the Big East tournament to Seton Hall.

This was the Bulls' final season in the Big East Conference, as they joined the American Athletic Conference the next season.

== Off season ==
After completing massive renovations to the USF Sun Dome, the Bulls will return to their home venue after a year away. The opening game was scheduled to be on November 10 against rival UCF.

USF was selected to play in the Big East-SEC Challenge and will host Georgia on November 30.

At Big East Media day, USF was selected to finish in 8th place in the Big East Preseason Coaches' Poll, their highest selection since joining the Big East in 2005. Sophomore point guard, Anthony Collins was also awarded at Big East Media Day, being selected to the Preseason All-Big East Second Team.

=== Departures ===
#	Name	Position	Height	Weight	Year	Hometown	Notes
1	Ron Anderson	Forward	6–8	237	RS Senior	Upper Marlboro, MD	Graduated
15	Blake Nash	Guard	6–0	190	Sophomore	Casa Grande, AZ	Transferred to Texas Tech
24	Augustus Gilchrist	Forward	6–10	235	Senior	Clinton, MD	Graduated
25	Alberto Damour	Forward	6–5	216	Senior	Poinciana, FL	Graduated
34	Hugh Robertson	Guard	6–6	200	Senior	Macon, GA	Graduated

=== Incoming Recruits ===
#	Name	Position	Height	Weight	Year	Previous School	Hometown	Notes
1	Musa Abdul-Aleem	Guard	6–5	221	Sophomore	Georgia Perimeter / W.D. Mohammed HS	Atlanta, GA	Junior College Transfer
3	Zach LeDay	Forward	6–7	223	Freshman	The Colony HS	The Colony, TX	
15	Shemiye McLendon	Guard	6-3	195	Junior	Hofstra / IMG Academy	Vero Beach, FL	Walk-on Transfer
23	Javonte Hawkins	Guard	6–5	202	Freshman	Huntington Prep	Flint, MI	
33	Kore White	Forward	6–8	241	RS Senior	Florida Atlantic / Dillard HS	Fort Lauderdale, FL	Graduate Transfer

== Season Highlights ==
USF notched its first ever win in the SEC-Big East Challenge with a home victory over Georgia on November 30. That victory helped the Big East Conference to a 9–3 victory over the SEC.

A number of USF players received honors during the season for their performance on the court.

Anthony Collins was honored by the Big East by being named to the Big East Honor Roll on December 2. On December 20, Collins was nominated as a candidate for the Bob Cousy Award, one of 85 nominees for the best collegiate Point Guard in the nation.

Victor Rudd picked up a pair of honors on December 23, being named the Big East Player of the Week and being named the Oscar Robertson National Player of the Week by the United States Basketball Writers Association.

The Bulls finished the regular season with a record of 12–18, 3–15 in conference play. USF earned the #13 seed in the 2013 Big East men's basketball tournament, where they were eliminated in the first round with a 42–46 loss in overtime to Seton Hall.

USF finished the season with an overall record of 12–19 and were unable to qualify for a post season tournament.

This marked the end of USF's membership in the Big East before moving to the American Athletic Conference. The Bulls finished their run in the Big East with an overall record of 41–107 (.277).

== Roster ==
2012–13 South Florida Bulls men's basketball team
Players
Coaches

Pos.	#	Name	Height	Weight	Year	Hometown
G	0	Martino Brock	6 ft 5 in (1.96 m)	205 lb (93 kg)	Jr	Memphis, TN
G	1	Musa Abdul-Aleem (injured)	6 ft 5 in (1.96 m)	221 lb (100 kg)	So	Atlanta, GA
F	2	Victor Rudd	6 ft 9 in (2.06 m)	229 lb (104 kg)	RS Jr	Los Angeles, CA
F	3	Zach LeDay	6 ft 7 in (2.01 m)	223 lb (101 kg)	Fr	The Colony, TX
G	4	Mike Dakkak (W)	6 ft 0 in (1.83 m)	180 lb (82 kg)	Sr	Sarasota, FL
G	5	Jawanza Poland	6 ft 4 in (1.93 m)	204 lb (93 kg)	Sr	Wichita, KS
G	10	Mike McCloskey	6 ft 0 in (1.83 m)	164 lb (74 kg)	Sr	Orlando, FL
G	11	Anthony Collins	6 ft 1 in (1.85 m)	175 lb (79 kg)	So	Houston, TX
G	15	Shemiye McLendon (I)	6 ft 3 in (1.91 m)	195 lb (88 kg)	Jr	Vero Beach, FL
G	22	Shaun Noriega (injured)	6 ft 4 in (1.93 m)	207 lb (94 kg)	Sr	Sarasota, FL
G	23	Javontae Hawkins	6 ft 5 in (1.96 m)	202 lb (92 kg)	Fr	Flint, MI
F	32	Toarlyn Fitzpatrick	6 ft 8 in (2.03 m)	245 lb (111 kg)	Sr	Tampa, FL
F	33	Kore White	6 ft 8 in (2.03 m)	241 lb (109 kg)	RS Sr	Fort Lauderdale, FL
C	35	Jordan Omogbehin	7 ft 3 in (2.21 m)	334 lb (151 kg)	RS Fr	Lagos, Nigeria

Head coach

- Stan Heath

Assistant coach(es)

- Andy Hipsher
- Steve Roccaforte
- Eric Skeeters

Legend

- (C) Team captain
- (S) Suspended
- (I) Ineligible
- (W) Walk-on
- Injured
- Current redshirt

Roster
Last update: August 2, 2012

- Shemiye McLendon will be ineligible for the 2012–2013 season due to NCAA transfer rules.

== Schedule and results ==
Date time, TV	Opponent	Result	Record	Site (attendance) city, state
Exhibition
11/05/2012*; 7:00 pm	Eckerd	W 74–65	–	USF Sun Dome (N/A); Tampa, FL
Regular season
11/10/2012*; 7:00 pm, BHSN	Central Florida; War on I-4	L 56–74	0–1	USF Sun Dome (7,717); Tampa, FL
11/16/2012*; 7:30 pm	Maryland–Eastern Shore; USF Invitational Tournament	W 78–59	1–1	USF Sun Dome (3,931); Tampa, FL
11/17/2012*; 7:30 pm	Loyola-Chicago; USF Invitational Tournament	W 68–50	2–1	USF Sun Dome (4,014); Tampa, FL
11/18/2012*; 3:00 pm, ESPN3	Western Michigan; USF Invitational Tournament	L 53–58	2–2	USF Sun Dome (3,612); Tampa, FL
11/20/2012*; 7:30 pm	Bradley	W 82–63	3–2	USF Sun Dome (4,768); Tampa, FL
11/26/2012*; 7:00 pm	at Stetson	W 63–54	4–2	Edmunds Center (1,063); DeLand, FL
11/30/2012*; 7:00 pm, ESPNU	Georgia; SEC–Big East Challenge	W 64–53	5–2	USF Sun Dome (5,167); Tampa, FL
12/05/2012*; 9:00 pm, ESPNU	at No. 23 Oklahoma State	L 49–61	5–3	Gallagher-Iba Arena (8,978); Stillwater, OK
12/18/2012*; 7:00 pm, BHSN/ESPN3	Youngstown State	W 72–54	6–3	USF Sun Dome (3,680); Tampa, FL
12/21/2012*; 7:00 pm	Bowling Green	W 87–84 ^{3OT}	7–3	USF Sun Dome (4,008); Tampa, FL
12/29/2012*; 7:00 pm, BHSN/ESPN3	George Mason	W 61–57	8–3	USF Sun Dome (4,856); Tampa, FL
01/02/2013*; 8:00 pm, CBSSN	at Central Florida; War on I-4	W 65–56	9–3	UCF Arena (4,904); Orlando, FL
01/06/2013; 12:00 pm, BIG EAST Network/BHSN/ESPN3	No. 7 Syracuse	L 44–55	9–4 (0–1)	USF Sun Dome (10,024); Tampa, FL
01/09/2013; 8:00 pm, BIG EAST Network/BHSN/ESPN3	Villanova	L 53–61	9–5 (0–2)	USF Sun Dome (5,014); Tampa, FL
01/12/2013; 4:00 pm, BIG EAST Network/BHSN/ESPN3	at No. 3 Louisville	L 38–64	9–6 (0–3)	KFC Yum! Center (21,903); Louisville, KY
01/17/2013; 9:00 pm, ESPN2	at Rutgers	L 67–70	9–7 (0–4)	Louis Brown Athletic Center (4,205); Piscataway, NJ
01/19/2013; 6:00 pm, BIG EAST Network/BHSN/ESPN3	Georgetown	W 61–58	10–7 (1–4)	USF Sun Dome (6,189); Tampa, FL
01/23/2013; 7:00 pm, ESPNU	at Seton Hall	L 47–55	10–8 (1–5)	Prudential Center (6,327); Newark, NJ
01/26/2013; 12:00 pm, BIG EAST Network/BHSN/ESPN3	No. 24 Notre Dame	L 65–73	10–9 (1–6)	USF Sun Dome (6,373); Tampa, FL
01/28/2013; 9:00 pm, ESPNU	at No. 25 Marquette	L 50–63	10–10 (1–7)	BMO Harris Bradley Center (15,136); Milwaukee, WI
02/03/2013; 2:00 pm, BIG EAST Network/BHSN/ESPN3	at Connecticut	L 64–69 ^{OT}	10–11 (1–8)	XL Center (9,205); Hartford, CT
02/06/2013; 7:00 pm, ESPN2	No. 24 Marquette	L 47–70	10–12 (1–9)	USF Sun Dome (5,186); Tampa, FL
02/09/2013; 3:00 pm, ESPNU	at Villanova	L 40–68	10–13 (1–10)	The Pavilion (6,500); Villanova, PA
02/13/2013; 9:00 pm, ESPNU	Providence	L 66–76	10–14 (1–11)	USF Sun Dome (4,519); Tampa, FL
02/17/2013; 1:00 pm, ESPN	No. 12 Louisville	L 41–59	10–15 (1–12)	USF Sun Dome (7,368); Tampa, FL
02/20/2013; 7:00 pm, BIG EAST Network/BHSN/ESPN3	at St. John's	L 54–69	10–16 (1–13)	Carnesecca Arena (5,602); Queens, NY
02/27/2013; 7:00 pm, BIG EAST Network/BHSN/ESPN3	at No. 23 Pittsburgh	L 44–64	10–17 (1–14)	Petersen Events Center (12,320); Pittsburgh, PA
03/03/2013; 2:00 pm, BIG EAST Network/BHSN/ESPN3	DePaul	W 83–73	11–17 (2–14)	USF Sun Dome (5,383); Tampa, FL
03/06/2013; 9:08 pm, ESPNU	Connecticut	W 65–51	12–17 (3–14)	USF Sun Dome (5,198); Tampa, FL
03/09/2013; 4:00 pm, BIG EAST Network/BHSN/ESPN3	at Cincinnati	L 53–61 ^{OT}	12–18 (3–15)	Fifth Third Arena (11,572); Cincinnati, OH
2013 Big East men's basketball tournament
03/12/2013; 7:00 pm, ESPNU	vs. Seton Hall; First Round	L 42–46 ^{OT}	12–19	Madison Square Garden (20,057); New York, NY
*Non-conference game. ^{#}Rankings from AP Poll. (#) Tournament seedings in parentheses. All times are in Eastern Time.
