= 2013 Big East men's basketball tournament =

- 2013 Big East Championship logo
- Classification: Division I
- Season: 2012–13
- Teams: 14
- Site: Madison Square Garden; New York City
- Champions: Louisville (3rd title)
- Winning coach: Rick Pitino (3rd title)
- MVP: Peyton Siva (Louisville)
- Television: ESPN, ESPN2, ESPNU

2012–13 Big East men's basketball standings
	Conf.				Overall
Team	W		L	PCT	W		L	PCT
No. 2 Louisville†**	14	–	4	.778	35	–	5	.875
No. 8 Georgetown	14	–	4	.778	25	–	7	.781
No. 15 Marquette	14	–	4	.778	26	–	9	.743
No. 20 Pittsburgh	12	–	6	.667	24	–	9	.727
No. 16 Syracuse	11	–	7	.611	30	–	10	.750
No. 23 Notre Dame	11	–	7	.611	25	–	10	.714
Villanova	10	–	8	.556	20	–	14	.588
Connecticut*	10	–	8	.556	20	–	10	.667
Cincinnati	9	–	9	.500	22	–	12	.647
Providence	9	–	9	.500	19	–	15	.559
St. John's	8	–	10	.444	17	–	16	.515
Rutgers	5	–	13	.278	15	–	16	.484
Seton Hall	3	–	15	.167	15	–	18	.455
South Florida	3	–	15	.167	12	–	19	.387
DePaul	2	–	16	.111	11	–	21	.344
† 2013 Big East tournament winner As of March 30, 2013; Rankings from AP Poll; *Ineligible for postseason play due to APR penalties.

The 2013 Big East men's basketball tournament, officially known as the 2013 Big East Championship, was the 34th annual Big East men's basketball tournament, deciding the champion of the 2012–13 Big East Conference men's basketball season. For the 31st consecutive season, the tournament was held at Madison Square Garden in New York City, from March 12–16, 2013. The tournament only featured 14 teams due to Connecticut being given a one-year postseason ban due to APR penalties. This would have been the last year with as many as 16 teams participating in the Big East tournament, but Connecticut was ineligible and West Virginia moved to the Big 12 before the beginning of the season. The conference tournament champion received an automatic bid to the 2013 NCAA tournament.

Following a period of turnover in the conference membership, the Big East name, its logos, and its tournament history were assumed by schools of the original Big East that do not sponsor FBS football. The reconfigured Big East continues to hold its tournament at Madison Square Garden. The FBS schools formerly in the Big East play under a new name, the American Athletic Conference; its first conference tournament was played in Memphis, Tennessee and that event has since alternated between Hartford, Connecticut and Orlando, Florida.

== Seeds ==
All teams except for Connecticut (who were forced to end their season after their last regular season game due to Academic Progress Rate violations) qualified for the tournament; seeds 11–14 played a first-round game, while teams five through ten received byes to the second round. The top four seeds received double-byes to the quarterfinals.

Teams were seeded by conference record, with a tiebreaker system used to seed teams with identical conference records.

Seed	School	Conf (Overall)	Tiebreaker
#1	Georgetown‡†	14–4 (24–5)	2–1 vs. Louisville/Marquette
#2	Louisville‡†	14–4 (26–5)	1–1 vs. Georgetown/Marquette
#3	Marquette‡†	14–4 (23–7)	1–2 vs. Georgetown/Louisville
#4	Pittsburgh†	12–6 (24–7)	
#5	Syracuse#	11–7 (23–8)	1–0 vs. Notre Dame
#6	Notre Dame#	11–7 (23–8)	0–1 vs. Syracuse
#7	Villanova#	10–8 (19–12)	
#8	Providence#	9–9 (17–13)	1–0 vs. Cincinnati
#9	Cincinnati#	9–9 (21–10)	0–1 vs. Providence
#10	St. John's#	8–10 (16–14)	
#11	Rutgers	5–13 (14–15)	
#12	Seton Hall	3–15 (14–17)	1–0 vs. South Florida
#13	South Florida	3–15 (12–18)	0–1 vs. Seton Hall
#14	DePaul	2–16 (11–20)	
‡ – Big East regular season champions. † – Received a double-bye in the conference tournament. # – Received a single-bye in the conference tournament. Overall records are as of the end of the regular season.

== Schedule ==
All tournament games were nationally televised on an ESPN network:

Session	Game	Time*	Matchup^{#}	Television	Attendance
First Round – Tuesday, March 12
1	1	7:00 PM	#12 Seton Hall vs. #13 South Florida	ESPNU	
1	2	9:00 PM	#11 Rutgers vs. #14 DePaul	ESPNU	
Second Round – Wednesday, March 13
2	3	12:00 PM	#8 Providence vs. #9 Cincinnati	ESPN	
2	4	2:00 PM	#5 Syracuse vs. #12 Seton Hall	ESPN	
3	5	7:00 PM	#7 Villanova vs. #10 St. John's	ESPN2	
3	6	9:00 PM	#6 Notre Dame vs. #11 Rutgers	ESPN2	
Quarterfinals – Thursday, March 14
4	7	12:00 PM	#1 Georgetown vs. #9 Cincinnati	ESPN	
4	8	2:00 PM	#4 Pittsburgh vs. #5 Syracuse	ESPN	
5	9	7:00 PM	#2 Louisville vs. #7 Villanova	ESPN	
5	10	9:00 PM	#3 Marquette vs. #6 Notre Dame	ESPN	
Semifinals – Friday, March 15
6	11	7:00 PM	#1 Georgetown vs. #5 Syracuse	ESPN	
6	12	9:00 PM	#2 Louisville vs. #6 Notre Dame	ESPN	
Championship Game – Saturday, March 16
7	13	8:30 PM	#5 Syracuse vs. #2 Louisville	ESPN	
*Game Times in EST. #-Rankings denote tournament seeding.

== Bracket ==
First round Tuesday, March 12
13	South Florida	42
12	Seton Hall	46^{OT}
14	DePaul	57
11	Rutgers	76

Second round Wednesday, March 13
9	Cincinnati	61
8	Providence	44
12	Seton Hall	63
5	#19 Syracuse	75
10	St. John's	53
7	Villanova	66
11	Rutgers	61
6	#24 Notre Dame	69

Quarterfinals; Thursday, March 14
9	Cincinnati	43
1	#5 Georgetown	62
5	#19 Syracuse	62
4	#17 Pittsburgh	59
7	Villanova	55
2	#4 Louisville	74
6	#24 Notre Dame	73
3	#12 Marquette	65

Semifinals; Friday, March 15
1	#5 Georgetown	55
5	#19 Syracuse	58^{OT}
2	#4 Louisville	69
6	#24 Notre Dame	57

Championship Game; Saturday, March 16
5	#19 Syracuse	61
2	#4 Louisville	78

^{OT} denotes overtime game

== All-Tournament team ==
- Russ Smith, Louisville
- James Southerland, Syracuse
- Brandon Triche, Syracuse
- Markel Starks, Georgetown
- Pat Connaughton, Notre Dame

Dave Gavitt Trophy (Most Outstanding Player)

- Peyton Siva, Louisville
