= 2012–13 Pittsburgh Panthers men's basketball team =

American college basketball season

2012–13 Pittsburgh Panthers men's basketball

NCAA tournament, round of 64
- Conference: Big East Conference (1979–2013)

Ranking
- AP: No. 20
- Record: 24–9 (12–6 Big East)
- Head coach: Jamie Dixon (10th season)
- Assistant coaches: Pat Sandle (12th season); Brandin Knight (5th season); Bill Barton (2nd season)
- Home arena: Petersen Events Center (Capacity: 12,508)

2012–13 Big East men's basketball standings
	Conf.				Overall
Team	W		L	PCT	W		L	PCT
No. 2 Louisville†**	14	–	4	.778	35	–	5	.875
No. 8 Georgetown	14	–	4	.778	25	–	7	.781
No. 15 Marquette	14	–	4	.778	26	–	9	.743
No. 20 Pittsburgh	12	–	6	.667	24	–	9	.727
No. 16 Syracuse	11	–	7	.611	30	–	10	.750
No. 23 Notre Dame	11	–	7	.611	25	–	10	.714
Villanova	10	–	8	.556	20	–	14	.588
Connecticut*	10	–	8	.556	20	–	10	.667
Cincinnati	9	–	9	.500	22	–	12	.647
Providence	9	–	9	.500	19	–	15	.559
St. John's	8	–	10	.444	17	–	16	.515
Rutgers	5	–	13	.278	15	–	16	.484
Seton Hall	3	–	15	.167	15	–	18	.455
South Florida	3	–	15	.167	12	–	19	.387
DePaul	2	–	16	.111	11	–	21	.344
† 2013 Big East tournament winner As of March 30, 2013; Rankings from AP Poll; *Ineligible for postseason play due to APR penalties.

The 2012–13 Pittsburgh Panthers men's basketball team represented the University of Pittsburgh, widely known as "Pitt", in the 2012–13 NCAA Division I men's basketball season. The Panthers' head coach was Jamie Dixon, in his 10th year as head coach and 14th overall at Pitt. The team played its home games in the Petersen Events Center in Pittsburgh and was in its final season as a member of the Big East Conference. Pitt played in the ACC the following season. They finished the conference season with 12–6 in the Big East Conference, which they placed 4th. In the postseason, they lost to Syracuse in the quarterfinals of the 2013 Big East men's basketball tournament and lost in the first round of 2013 NCAA tournament to Wichita State to conclude the season with an overall record of 24–9.

== Roster ==
2012–13 Pittsburgh Panthers men's basketball team
Players
Coaches

Pos.	#	Name	Height	Weight	Year	Previous school	Hometown
G	0	James Robinson	6 ft 3 in (1.91 m)	200 lb (91 kg)	Fr	DeMatha Catholic	Mitchellville, Maryland
G	1	Tray Woodall (redshirt)	6 ft 0 in (1.83 m)	190 lb (86 kg)	Sr	St. Anthony (Paterson, New Jersey)	Brooklyn, New York
G	3	Cameron Wright (redshirt)	6 ft 4 in (1.93 m)	205 lb (93 kg)	So	Benedictine	Cleveland, Ohio
F	5	Durand Johnson (redshirt)	6 ft 6 in (1.98 m)	195 lb (88 kg)	Fr	Brewster Academy (Wolfeboro, New Hampshire)	Baltimore
F	11	Dante Taylor	6 ft 9 in (2.06 m)	235 lb (107 kg)	Sr	National Christian Academy (Oxon Hill, Maryland)	Greenburgh, New York
G/F	12	Chris Jones	6 ft 6 in (1.98 m)	210 lb (95 kg)	Fr	Teaneck	Teaneck, New Jersey
C	13	Steven Adams	7 ft 0 in (2.13 m)	250 lb (113 kg)	Fr	Notre Dame Prep (Fitchburg, Massachusetts)	Rotorua, New Zealand
F	15	Aron Nwankwo	6 ft 7.5 in (2.02 m)	215 lb (98 kg)	Jr	Baltimore City College	Baltimore
G/F	21	Lamar Patterson (redshirt)	6 ft 5 in (1.96 m)	221 lb (100 kg)	Jr	St. Benedict's (Newark, New Jersey)	Lancaster, Pennsylvania
G/F	23	Trey Zeigler	6 ft 5 in (1.96 m)	203 lb (92 kg)	Jr	Mount Pleasant; Central Michigan	Detroit
G	24	Mike Lecak	6 ft 2 in (1.88 m)	175 lb (79 kg)	So	North Canyon (Phoenix, Arizona); Wheeling Jesuit	Pittsburgh
C	33	Malcolm Gilbert	6 ft 11 in (2.11 m)	235 lb (107 kg)	So	Academy of the New Church (Bryn Athyn, Pennsylvania)	Smyrna, Delaware
F	42	Talib Zanna (redshirt)	6 ft 9 in (2.06 m)	230 lb (104 kg)	Jr	Bishop McNamara (Forestville, Maryland)	Kaduna, Nigeria
F	44	J. J. Moore	6 ft 6 in (1.98 m)	215 lb (98 kg)	Jr	South Kent Prep (South Kent, Connecticut)	Brentwood, New York

Head coach

- Jamie Dixon (TCU)

Assistant coach(es)

- Pat Sandle (San Francisco State)
- Brandin Knight (Pittsburgh)
- Bill Barton (Salem State)

Legend

- (C) Team captain
- (S) Suspended
- (I) Ineligible
- (W) Walk-on
- Injured
- Current redshirt

Roster

== Schedule ==
Pitt's 2012–13 schedule.

Date time, TV	Rank^{#}	Opponent^{#}	Result	Record	Site (attendance) city, state
Scrimmage
Sun. Oct. 14*; 2:00 p.m., Pitt Panthers TV		Blue-Gold Scrimmage; Fan Fest/Maggie Dixon Heart Health Fair			Petersen Events Center; Pittsburgh, PA
Exhibition
Fri. Oct. 26*; 7:00 p.m., Pitt Panthers TV		Indiana (PA)	W 69–54	0–0	Petersen Events Center (5,325); Pittsburgh
Fri. Nov. 2*; 7:00 p.m., Pitt Panthers TV		Hawaii-Hilo	W 77–45	0–0	Petersen Events Center (6,115); Pittsburgh
Regular season
Fri. Nov. 9*; 6:00 p.m., ESPN3		Mount St. Mary's	W 80–48	1–0	Petersen Events Center (8,928); Pittsburgh
Mon. Nov. 12*; 6:00 p.m., ESPN3		Fordham; NIT Season Tip-Off	W 86–51	2–0	Petersen Events Center (6,425); Pittsburgh
Tue. Nov. 13*; 9:00 p.m., ESPNU		Lehigh; NIT Season Tip-Off	W 78-53	3–0	Petersen Events Center (7,225); Pittsburgh
Sat. Nov. 17*; 7:00 p.m., Pitt Panthers TV		Oakland	W 72–62 ^{OT}	4–0	Petersen Events Center (9,710); Pittsburgh
Wed. Nov. 21*; 9:30 p.m., ESPN2		vs. No. 4 Michigan; NIT Season Tip-Off	L 62–67	4–1	Madison Square Garden (7,230); New York
Fri. Nov. 23*; 2:30 p.m., ESPN		vs. Delaware; NIT Season Tip-Off	W 85–59	5–1	Madison Square Garden (7,198); New York
Tue. Nov. 27*; 7:00 p.m., Pitt Panthers TV/ESPN3		Howard	W 70–46	6–1	Petersen Events Center (8,025); Pittsburgh
Sat. Dec. 1*; 7:00 p.m., ESPN3		Detroit	W 74–61	7–1	Petersen Events Center (9,179); Pittsburgh
Wed. Dec. 5*; 7:00 p.m., ESPN3		vs. Duquesne; The City Game	W 66–45	8–1	Consol Energy Center (13,089); Pittsburgh
Sat. Dec. 8*; 7:00 p.m., ESPN3		North Florida	W 89–47	9–1	Petersen Events Center (8,708); Pittsburgh
Sat. Dec. 15*; 7:00 p.m., ESPN3		Bethune-Cookman	W 89–40	10–1	Petersen Events Center (8,115); Pittsburgh
Wed. Dec. 19*; 7:00 p.m., Pitt Panthers TV		Delaware State	W 71–43	11–1	Petersen Events Center (9,522); Pittsburgh
Sun. Dec. 23*; 5:00 p.m., Pitt Panthers TV/ESPN3		Kennesaw State	W 59–43	12–1	Petersen Events Center (8,125); Pittsburgh
Mon. Dec. 31; 12:00 p.m., ESPN2	No. 24	No. 14 Cincinnati	L 61–70	12–2 (0–1)	Petersen Events Center (12,510); Pittsburgh
Sat. Jan. 5; 11:00 a.m., ESPN2	No. 24	at Rutgers	L 62–67	12–3 (0–2)	Louis Brown Athletic Center (5,081); Piscataway, New Jersey
Tue. Jan. 8; 9:00 p.m., ESPNU		at No. 19 Georgetown	W 73–45	13–3 (1–2)	Verizon Center (13,011); Washington, D.C.
Sat. Jan. 12; 12:00 p.m., ESPNU		Marquette	L 67–74 ^{OT}	13–4 (1–3)	Petersen Events Center (12,513); Pittsburgh
Wed. Jan. 16; 7:00 p.m., ESPNU		at Villanova	W 58–43	14–4 (2–3)	The Pavilion (6,500); Villanova, Pennsylvania
Sat. Jan. 19; 12:00 p.m., ESPN2		Connecticut	W 69–61	15–4 (3–3)	Petersen Events Center (12,510); Pittsburgh
Tue. Jan. 22; 7:00 p.m., ESPN2		at Providence	W 68–64	16–4 (4–3)	Dunkin' Donuts Center (7,452); Providence, Rhode Island
Sat. Jan. 26; 4:00 p.m., Root Sports Pittsburgh/ESPN3		DePaul	W 93–55	17–4 (5–3)	Petersen Events Center (12,512); Pittsburgh
Mon. Jan. 28; 7:00 p.m., ESPN		at No. 12 Louisville	L 61–64	17–5 (5–4)	KFC Yum! Center (22,411); Louisville, Kentucky
Sat. Feb. 2; 12:00 p.m., ESPN		No. 6 Syracuse	W 65–55	18–5 (6–4)	Petersen Events Center (12,632); Pittsburgh
Mon. Feb. 4; 9:00 p.m., ESPNU	No. 23	Seton Hall	W 56–46	19–5 (7–4)	Petersen Events Center (10,253); Pittsburgh
Sat. Feb. 9; 6:00 p.m., ESPN	No. 23	at No. 17 Cincinnati	W 62–52	20–5 (8–4)	Fifth Third Arena (12,478); Cincinnati
Sat. Feb. 16; 1:00 p.m., CBS	No. 16	at No. 18 Marquette	L 69–79	20–6 (8–5)	BMO Harris Bradley Center (17,308); Milwaukee
Mon. Feb. 18; 7:00 p.m., ESPN	No. 20	No. 25 Notre Dame	L 42–51	20–7 (8–6)	Petersen Events Center (12,556); Pittsburgh
Sun. Feb. 24; 12:00 p.m., Root Sports Pittsburgh/ESPN3	No. 20	at St. John's	W 63–47	21–7 (9–6)	Madison Square Garden (9,129); New York
Wed. Feb. 27; 7:00 p.m., Root Sports Pittsburgh/ESPN3	No. 23	South Florida	W 64–44	22–7 (10–6)	Petersen Events Center (12,320); Pittsburgh
Sun. Mar. 3; 12:00 p.m., Root Sports Pittsburgh/ESPN3	No. 23	Villanova	W 73–64 ^{OT}	23–7 (11–6)	Petersen Events Center (12,553); Pittsburgh
Sat. Mar. 9; 2:00 p.m., WTAE TV/ESPN3	No. 20	at DePaul	W 81–66	24–7 (12–6)	Allstate Arena (8,454); Rosemont, Illinois
Postseason^{†} 2013 Big East men's basketball tournament
Thu. Mar. 14; 2:00 p.m., ESPN	(4) No. 17	vs. (5) No. 19 Syracuse; Quarterfinals	L 59–62	24–8	Madison Square Garden (20,057); New York City
NCAA Division I Men's Basketball Championship
Thu. Mar. 21*; 1:40 p.m., TBS	No. 20 (8)	vs. No. (9) Wichita State; Second Round	L 55–73	24–9	EnergySolutions Arena (18,044); Salt Lake City
*Non-conference game. ^{#}Rankings from Division I AP Poll unless otherwise noted. ^{†}Postseason ranks represent seeds in the applicable tournament. (#) Tournament seedings in parentheses. All times are in Eastern Standard Time.

== Rankings ==
Ranking movement Legend: ██ Improvement in ranking. ██ Decrease in ranking. ██ Not ranked the previous week. rv=Others receiving votes.
Poll	Pre	Wk 1	Wk 2	Wk 3	Wk 4	Wk 5	Wk 6	Wk 7	Wk 8	Wk 9	Wk 10	Wk 11	Wk 12	Wk 13	Wk 14	Wk 15	Wk 16	Wk 17	Wk 18	Wk 19	Final
AP	rv	rv	rv	rv	rv	rv	rv	24	24	rv	rv	rv	rv	23	16	20	23	20	17	20	n/a
Coaches	rv	rv	rv	rv	rv	rv	rv	24	22	rv	--	rv	rv	25	17	22	rv	22	19	22	rv

== Postseason ==
Pitt was announced as one of the four eight seed in the 2013 NCAA Division I men's basketball tournament on Sunday, March 17, 2013. They played in the West Region. Their first game was against nine seed Wichita State University on Thursday, March 21, in Salt Lake City at 1:40 in the afternoon. They lost with a final score of 73 to 55.
