= 2012–13 Seton Hall Pirates men's basketball team =

American college basketball season

2012–13 Seton Hall Pirates men's basketball
- Conference: Big East Conference
- Record: 15–18 (3–15 Big East)
- Head coach: Kevin Willard
- Assistant coaches: Shaheen Holloway; Chris Pompey; Dan McHale
- Home arena: Prudential Center; Walsh Gymnasium

2012–13 Big East men's basketball standings
	Conf.				Overall
Team	W		L	PCT	W		L	PCT
No. 2 Louisville†**	14	–	4	.778	35	–	5	.875
No. 8 Georgetown	14	–	4	.778	25	–	7	.781
No. 15 Marquette	14	–	4	.778	26	–	9	.743
No. 20 Pittsburgh	12	–	6	.667	24	–	9	.727
No. 16 Syracuse	11	–	7	.611	30	–	10	.750
No. 23 Notre Dame	11	–	7	.611	25	–	10	.714
Villanova	10	–	8	.556	20	–	14	.588
Connecticut*	10	–	8	.556	20	–	10	.667
Cincinnati	9	–	9	.500	22	–	12	.647
Providence	9	–	9	.500	19	–	15	.559
St. John's	8	–	10	.444	17	–	16	.515
Rutgers	5	–	13	.278	15	–	16	.484
Seton Hall	3	–	15	.167	15	–	18	.455
South Florida	3	–	15	.167	12	–	19	.387
DePaul	2	–	16	.111	11	–	21	.344
† 2013 Big East tournament winner As of March 30, 2013; Rankings from AP Poll; *Ineligible for postseason play due to APR penalties.

The 2012–13 Seton Hall Pirates men's basketball team represented Seton Hall University during the 2012–13 NCAA Division I men's basketball season. The Pirates, led by head coach Kevin Willard, played its home games in Newark, New Jersey at the Prudential Center and were members of the Big East Conference. They finished the season 15–18, 3–15 in Big East play to finish in a tie for 13th place. They lost in the second round of the Big East tournament to Syaracuse.

== Roster ==
2012–13 Seton Hall Pirates men's basketball team
Players
Coaches

Pos.	#	Name	Height	Weight	Year	Hometown
G	0	Tom Maayan	6 ft 1 in (1.85 m)	180 lb (82 kg)	Fr	Galilee, Israel
G	1	Aaron Cosby	6 ft 3 in (1.91 m)	190 lb (86 kg)	So	Louisville, Kentucky
F	2	Brandon Mobley	6 ft 9 in (2.06 m)	210 lb (95 kg)	So	Savannah, Georgia
G	4	Sterling Gibbs	6 ft 1 in (1.85 m)	185 lb (84 kg)	So	Scotch Plains, New Jersey
G	10	Kyle Smyth	6 ft 4 in (1.93 m)	185 lb (84 kg)		River Edge, New Jersey
F	13	Haralds Kārlis	6 ft 5 in (1.96 m)	185 lb (84 kg)	So	Riga, Latvia
G	14	Freddie Wilson	6 ft 2 in (1.88 m)	175 lb (79 kg)	So	New Haven, Connecticut
C	21	Gene Teague	6 ft 9 in (2.06 m)	290 lb (132 kg)	RS Jr	Vineland, New Jersey
G/F	22	Brian Oliver	6 ft 5 in (1.96 m)	226 lb (103 kg)	RS Jr	Glassboro, New Jersey
G/F	23	Fuquan Edwin	6 ft 6 in (1.98 m)	205 lb (93 kg)	Jr	Paterson, New Jersey
F	32	Kevin Johnson	6 ft 9 in (2.06 m)	240 lb (109 kg)	So	Compton, California
F	33	Patrik Auda	6 ft 9 in (2.06 m)	225 lb (102 kg)	Jr	Brno, Czech Republic
C	50	Aaron Geramipoor	6 ft 11 in (2.11 m)	255 lb (116 kg)	Jr	Manchester, England

Head coach

- Kevin Willard (Pittsburgh)

Assistant coach(es)

- Shaheen Holloway (Seton Hall)
- Chris Pompey (Pittsburgh)
- Dan McHale (Kentucky)

Legend

- (C) Team captain
- (S) Suspended
- (I) Ineligible
- (W) Walk-on
- Injured
- Current redshirt

== Schedule ==
Date time, TV	Opponent	Result	Record	Site (attendance) city, state
Exhibition
10/27/2012*; 7:00 pm	Wilmington	W 113–72	1–0	Walsh Gymnasium; South Orange, NJ
Regular season
11/09/2012*; 7:30 pm	UMKC; Hall of Fame Tip-Off	W 75–36	1–0	Walsh Gymnasium (2,600); South Orange, NJ
11/12/2012*; 7:00 pm	Norfolk State; Hall of Fame Tip-Off	W 78–65	2–0	Prudential Center (6,165); Newark, NJ
11/17/2012*; 7:30 pm, ESPN3	vs. Washington; Hall of Fame Tip-Off semifinals	L 73–84 ^{OT}	2–1	Mohegan Sun Arena (6,003); Uncasville, CT
11/18/2012*; 7:00 pm, ESPN3	vs. Rhode Island; Hall of Fame Tip-Off Consolation game	W 60–55	3–1	Mohegan Sun Arena (3,863); Uncasville, CT
11/21/2012*; 7:00 pm	Maine	W 76–49	4–1	Prudential Center (5,876); Newark, NJ
11/25/2012*; 1:00 pm	Saint Peter's	W 76–61	5–1	Prudential Center (6,207); Newark, NJ
11/29/2012*; 9:30 pm, ESPNU	at LSU; SEC–Big East Challenge	L 67–72	5–2	Pete Maravich Assembly Center (7,295); Baton Rouge, LA
12/04/2012*; 7:00 pm	NJIT	W 68–59	6–2	Prudential Center (6,203); Newark, NJ
12/08/2012*; 7:00 pm, ESPN3	at Wake Forest	W 71–67	7–2	Lawrence Joel Veterans Memorial Coliseum (8,411); Winston-Salem, NC
12/16/2012*; 1:00 pm	North Carolina A&T	W 77–66	8–2	Prudential Center (7,575); Newark, NJ
12/19/2012*; 7:00 pm	Longwood	W 79–61	9–2	Prudential Center (6,215); Newark, NJ
12/22/2012*; 8:00 pm	vs. Long Island; Brooklyn Hoops Holiday Invitational	W 89–58	10–2	Barclays Center (N/A); Brooklyn, NY
12/28/2012*; 7:00 pm, SNY/ESPN3	Stony Brook	W 60–59	11–2	Prudential Center (7,288); Newark, NJ
01/02/2013; 9:00 pm, SNY/ESPN3	at DePaul	W 73–72	12–2 (1–0)	Allstate Arena (7,189); Rosemont, IL
01/05/2013; 12:00 pm, SNY/ESPN3	at No. 21 Notre Dame	L 74–93	12–3 (1–1)	Joyce Center (8,523); Notre Dame, IN
01/09/2013; 7:00 pm, ESPN2	No. 3 Louisville	L 58–73	12–4 (1–2)	Prudential Center (7,013); Newark, NJ
01/13/2013; 12:00 pm, SNY/ESPN3	Providence	L 55–67	12–5 (1–3)	Prudential Center (8,252); Newark, NJ
01/16/2013; 9:00 pm, MSG/ESPN3	at No. 25 Marquette	L 62–69	12–6 (1–4)	BMO Harris Bradley Center (13,842); Milwaukee, WI
01/23/2013; 7:00 pm, ESPNU	South Florida	W 55–47	13–6 (2–4)	Prudential Center (6,327); Newark, NJ
01/27/2013; 12:00 pm, ESPN3	at St. John's	L 67–71	13–7 (2–5)	Madison Square Garden (7,641); New York, NY
01/30/2013; 7:00 pm, MSG+/ESPN3	at Georgetown	L 52–74	13–8 (2–6)	Verizon Center (7,567); Washington, D.C.
02/02/2013; 11:00 am, ESPNU	No. 24 Cincinnati	L 59–65	13–9 (2–7)	Prudential Center (6,961); Newark, NJ
02/04/2013; 9:00 pm, ESPNU	at No. 23 Pittsburgh	L 46–56	13–10 (2–8)	Petersen Events Center (10,253); Pittsburgh, PA
02/10/2013; 12:00 pm, SNY/ESPN3	Connecticut	L 67–78	13–11 (2–9)	Prudential Center (7,634); Newark, NJ
02/12/2013; 7:00 pm, ESPN2	at Rutgers; Rivalry	L 55–57	13–12 (2–10)	Louis Brown Athletic Center (5,803); Piscataway, NJ
02/16/2013; 8:00 pm, SNY/ESPN3	No. 6 Syracuse	L 65–76	13–13 (2–11)	Prudential Center (13,569); Newark, NJ
02/19/2013; 7:00 pm, MSG/ESPN3	No. 17 Marquette	L 46–67	13–14 (2–12)	Prudential Center (6,224); Newark, NJ
02/23/2013; 12:00 pm, SNY/ESPN3	at No. 10 Louisville	L 61–79	13–15 (2–13)	KFC Yum! Center (22,332); Louisville, KY
02/25/2013; 9:00 pm, ESPNU	Villanova	W 66–65	14–15 (3–13)	Prudential Center (6,771); Newark, NJ
03/05/2013; 9:00 pm, SNY/ESPN3	at Providence	L 66–76	14–16 (3–14)	Dunkin' Donuts Center (7,480); Providence, RI
03/08/2013; 7:00 pm, SNY/ESPN3	Rutgers; Rivalry	L 51–56	14–17 (3–15)	Prudential Center (8,708); Newark, NJ
2013 Big East men's basketball tournament
03/12/2013; 7:00 pm, ESPNU	vs. South Florida; First Round	W 46–42 ^{OT}	15–17	Madison Square Garden (20,057); New York City, NY
03/13/2013; 2:00 pm, ESPN	vs. No. 19 Syracuse; Second Round	L 63–75	15–18	Madison Square Garden (20,057); New York City, NY
*Non-conference game. ^{#}Rankings from AP Poll. (#) Tournament seedings in parentheses. All times are in Eastern Time.
