= 2012–13 Big East Conference men's basketball season =

- League: NCAA Division I
- Sport: Basketball
- Duration: December 31, 2012 through March 9, 2013
- Teams: 15
- TV partner(s): ESPN, CBS

Regular Season
- Co-Champions: Georgetown, Louisville, & Marquette
- Season MVP: Otto Porter

Tournament
- Champions: Louisville
- Runners-up: Syracuse
- Finals MVP: Peyton Siva (LOU)

Big East Conference men's basketball seasons
- ← 2011–12 2013–14 →

2012–13 Big East men's basketball standings
	Conf.				Overall
Team	W		L	PCT	W		L	PCT
No. 2 Louisville†**	14	–	4	.778	35	–	5	.875
No. 8 Georgetown	14	–	4	.778	25	–	7	.781
No. 15 Marquette	14	–	4	.778	26	–	9	.743
No. 20 Pittsburgh	12	–	6	.667	24	–	9	.727
No. 16 Syracuse	11	–	7	.611	30	–	10	.750
No. 23 Notre Dame	11	–	7	.611	25	–	10	.714
Villanova	10	–	8	.556	20	–	14	.588
Connecticut*	10	–	8	.556	20	–	10	.667
Cincinnati	9	–	9	.500	22	–	12	.647
Providence	9	–	9	.500	19	–	15	.559
St. John's	8	–	10	.444	17	–	16	.515
Rutgers	5	–	13	.278	15	–	16	.484
Seton Hall	3	–	15	.167	15	–	18	.455
South Florida	3	–	15	.167	12	–	19	.387
DePaul	2	–	16	.111	11	–	21	.344
† 2013 Big East tournament winner As of March 30, 2013; Rankings from AP Poll; *Ineligible for postseason play due to APR penalties.

The 2012–13 Big East Conference men's basketball season began with practices in October 2012 and ended with the 2013 Big East men's basketball tournament at Madison Square Garden March 12–16, 2013 in Manhattan, New York. The regular season began in November, with the conference schedule starting on December 31, 2012. 2012-13 marked the 34th year of the Big East, and the 2013 men's basketball Championship marked the 31st anniversary of the Big East at Madison Square Garden, the longest-running conference tournament at one venue in the country. With West Virginia now in the Big 12, the 2012-13 Big East Conference schedule included 4 repeat games.

UConn was ineligible for postseason tournament participation due to low APR scores, The Huskies were also ineligible for the 2013 Big East tournament; the school unsuccessfully appealed the ruling.

The 2012–13 season was the last for the Big East in its original form. In December 2012, the seven Big East schools that do not sponsor Division I FBS football—DePaul, Georgetown, Marquette, Providence, St. John's, Seton Hall, and Villanova, collectively called the "Catholic 7"—announced they would leave the Big East to start a new conference of their own. On March 8, 2013, the "Catholic 7" and the remaining Big East schools announced a separation agreement. Under the agreement, the "Catholic 7" purchased the Big East name and the contract with Madison Square Garden for the conference tournament, and began operating under the Big East name beginning on July 1, 2013. The remaining schools, which kept the charter of the original Big East, announced on April 3 that they would operate as the American Athletic Conference (American), now known as the American Conference. This was also the final season for Notre Dame, Pittsburgh, and Syracuse, all of which left for the ACC on July 1, 2013. On the same day, SMU, UCF, Memphis, Houston, and Temple became full members of The American.

== Preseason ==
=== Coaching changes ===
Jim Calhoun of Connecticut announced his retirement on September 13, 2012. Kevin Ollie, an assistant under Calhoun for the previous two years, was named Calhoun's successor.

=== Predicted Big East results ===
At Big East media day on October 17, the conference released their predictions for standings and All-Big East teams.

	Big East Coaches	Big East Writers
T-1.	Louisville (14)	Louisville (15)
2	Syracuse	Syracuse
3.	Notre Dame (1)	Notre Dame
4.	Cincinnati	Cincinnati
5.	Georgetown	Pittsburgh
6.	Pittsburgh	Georgetown
7.	Marquette	Marquette
8.	South Florida	South Florida
9.	Connecticut	Connecticut
10.	St. John's	St. John's
11.	Rutgers	Rutgers
12.	Villanova	Villanova
13.	DePaul	Providence
14.	Seton Hall	Seton Hall
15.	Providence	DePaul

first place votes

=== 2012-13 Preseason All-Big East Teams ===
First Team	Second Team	Honorable Mention
Sean Kilpatrick, G., CIN; Otto Porter, G., GTWN; Gorgui Dieng, C., LOU; Jack Cooley, F., ND; Vincent Council, G., PROV	Shabazz Napier, G., UCONN; Cleveland Melvin, F., DEP; D'Angelo Harrison, G., STJ; Anthony Collins, G., USF; Brandon Triche, G., SYR	Chane Behanan, F., LOU; Jerian Grant, G., ND; Tray Woodall, G., PITT; C. J. Fair, F., SYR

Big East Preseason Player of the Year: Peyton Siva, Louisville
Big East Preseason Rookie of the Year: Steven Adams, Pittsburgh

=== Preseason Watchlists ===
Naismith	John Wooden Award
Chane Behanan, LOU; Michael Carter-Williams, SYR; Jack Cooley, ND; Gorgui Dieng, LOU; Sean Kilpatrick, CIN; Otto Porter, GTWN; Peyton Siva, LOU	Chane Behanan, F., LOU; Jack Cooley, F., ND; Vincent Council, G., PROV; Gorgui Dieng, C., LOU; Sean Kilpatrick, G., CIN; Otto Porter, F., GTWN; Peyton Siva, G., LOU

== Regular season ==
=== Head coaches ===
Mick Cronin, Cincinnati
Kevin Ollie, Connecticut
Oliver Purnell, DePaul
John Thompson III, Georgetown
Rick Pitino, Louisville
Buzz Williams, Marquette
Mike Brey, Notre Dame
Jamie Dixon, Pittsburgh
Ed Cooley, Providence
Mike Rice, Rutgers
Steve Lavin, St. John's
Kevin Willard, Seton Hall
Stan Heath, South Florida
Jim Boeheim, Syracuse
Jay Wright, Villanova

=== Composite matrix ===
This table summarizes the head-to-head results between teams in conference play. (x) indicates games scheduled this season.

	Cincinnati	Connecticut	DePaul	Georgetown	Louisville	Marquette	Notre Dame	Pittsburgh	Providence	Rutgers	St. John's	Seton Hall	South Florida	Syracuse	Villanova
vs. Cincinnati	–	1–1	0–1	1–0	1–0	0–1	2–0	1–1	1–0	0–2	1–0	0–1	0-1	1–0	0–1
vs. Connecticut	1–1	–	0–2	1–0	1–0	1–0	0–1	1–0	0–2	0–1	1–0	0–1)	1–1	0–1	1–0
vs. DePaul	1–0	2–0	–	1–0	1–0	1–0	2–0	2–0	0–1	0–1	2–0	1–0	1–0	1–0	1–0
vs. Georgetown	0–1	0–1	0–1	–	0–1	1–1	0–1	1–0	0–1	0–2	0–2	0–1	1–0	0–2	1–0
vs. Louisville	0–1	0–1	0–1	1–0	–	0–1	2–0	0–1	0–1	0–1	0–1	0–2	0–2	1–1	1–0
vs. Marquette	1–0	0–1	0–1	1–1	1–0	–	0–1	0–2	0–1	0–1	0–1	0–2	0–2	0–1	1–0
vs. Notre Dame	0–2	1–0	0–2	1–0	1–1	1–0	–	0–1	1–0	0–1	1–1	0–1	0–1	1–0	0–1
vs. Pittsburgh	1–1	0–1	0–2	0–1	1–0	2–0	1–0	–	0–1	1–0	0–1	0–1	0–1	0–1	0–2
vs. Providence	0–1	2–0	1–0	1–0	1–0	1–0	0–1	1–0	–	0–1	0–1	0–2	0–1	2–0	0–2
vs. Rutgers	2–0	1–0	1–0	2–0	1–0	1–0	1–0	0–1	1–0	–	1–1	0–2	0–1	1–0	1–0
vs. St. John's	0–1	0–1	0–2	2–0	1–0	1–0	1–1	1–0	1–0	1–1	–	0–1	0–1	1–0	1–0
vs. Seton Hall	1–0	1–0	0–1	1–0	2–0	2–0	1–0	1–0	2–0	2–0	1–0	–	0–1	1–0	0–1
vs. South Florida	1-0	1–1	0–1	0–1	2–0	2–0	1–0	1–0	1–0	1–0	1–0	1–0	–	1–0	2–0
vs. Syracuse	0–1	1–0	0–1	2–0	1–1	1–0	0–1	1–0	0–2	0–1	0–1	0–1	0–1	–	1–1
vs. Villanova	1–0	0–1	0–1	0–1	0–1	0–1	1–0	2–0	2–0	0–1	0–1	1–0	0–2	1–1	–
Total	9–9	10–8	2–16	14-4	14–4	14–4	11–7	12–6	9–9	5–13	8–10	3–15	3–15	11–7	10–8

As of completion of games on March 6th

== Rankings ==
Legend
	Improvement in ranking.
	Drop in ranking.
RV	Received votes, but were not ranked.
AP	AP Poll
C	ESPN/USA Today Coaches Poll

2012–13 Big East Conference Weekly Rankings
		Pre	Wk 1	Wk 2	Wk 3	Wk 4	Wk 5	Wk 6	Wk 7	Wk 8	Wk 9	Wk 10	Wk 11	Wk 12	Wk 13	Wk 14	Wk 15	Wk 16	Wk 17	Wk 18	FINAL
Cincinnati	AP	24	24	22	17	11	11	11	8	14	21	RV	21	24	17	RV	RV				
Cincinnati	C	RV	24	20	16	12	12	11	8	15	20	24	20	23	17	RV	RV				
Connecticut	AP		23	21	RV	RV	RV	RV	RV	RV					RV			RV			
Connecticut	C		RV	23	RV	RV	RV	RV	RV	RV		RV						RV			
DePaul	AP																				
DePaul	C																				
Georgetown	AP	RV			20	15	15	15	15	15	19	RV	RV	RV	20	15	11	7	5 (2)	5 (2)	8
Georgetown	C				25	23	21	21	18	16	22	RV	RV	RV	21	15	11	8	5	5	8
Louisville	AP	2(20)	2 (18)	2 (19)	5	5	6	5	4	4	3	1 (36)	5	12	11	12	10	10	8	8	2 (20)
Louisville	C	2 (5)	2 (4)	2 (5)	6	6	6	4	3	4	4	1 (18)	5	13	12	12	10	9	6 (1)	6 (1)	2 (1)
Marquette	AP	RV	RV	RV	RV	RV	RV	RV			RV	25	RV	25	24	18	17	22	15	15	15
Marquette	C	RV	RV	RV	RV						RV	RV	RV	25	RV	20	20	22	17	17	16
Notre Dame	AP	22	20	RV	RV	22	22	22	21	21	17	20	24	RV	25	21	25	21	24	24	23
Notre Dame	C	23	21	RV	RV	25	24	22	20	19	16	20	23	RV	RV	21	25	20	24	24	RV
Pittsburgh	AP	RV	RV	RV	RV	RV	RV	RV	24	24	RV	RV	RV	RV	23	16	20	23	20	22	20
Pittsburgh	C	RV	RV	RV	RV	RV	RV	RV	24	22	RV		RV	RV	25	17	22	RV	22	22	22
Providence	AP																				
Providence	C																				
Rutgers	AP																				
Rutgers	C																				
St. John's	AP																				
St. John's	C																				
Seton Hall	AP																				
Seton Hall	C																				
South Florida	AP																				
South Florida	C																				
Syracuse	AP	9	8	6	6	4	4	3	9	7	7	6	3 (8)	6	9	6	8	12	17	17	16
Syracuse	C	9	8	6	5	4	4	3	7	7	7	6	4 (2)	6	9	7	8	12	16	16	18
Villanova	AP																				
Villanova	C																				

=== Weekly honors ===
Throughout the conference regular season, the Big East names a player of the week and rookie of the week each Monday.

Week	Player of the week	Rookie of the week
November 19, 2012	Shabazz Napier, G, Connecticut	Ryan Arcidiacono, G, Villanova
November 26, 2012	Sean Kilpatrick, G, Cincinnati	JaKarr Sampson, F, St. John's
December 3, 2012	James Southerland, G, Syracuse	James Robinson, G, Pittsburgh
December 10, 2012	Fuquan Edwin, G, Seton Hall	JaKarr Sampson, F, St. John's
December 17, 2012	Chane Behanan, F, Louisville	JaKarr Sampson, F, St. John's
December 23, 2012	Victor Rudd, F, South Florida	Omar Calhoun, G, Connecticut
December 31, 2012	Russ Smith, G, Louisville	Ryan Arcidiacono, G, Villanova
January 7, 2013	Brandon Triche, G, Syracuse	Ryan Arcidiacono, G, Villanova
January 14, 2013		
January 21, 2013		
January 28, 2013		
February 4, 2013		
February 11, 2013		
February 18, 2013		
February 25, 2013		
March 3, 2013		

== Postseason ==
=== Big East tournament ===
- March 12–16, 2013– Big East Conference Basketball Tournament, Madison Square Garden, Manhattan, NY.

2013 Big East men's basketball tournament seeds and results
Seed	School	Conf.	Over.	Tiebreaker	First Round March 12	Second Round March 13	Quarterfinals March 14	Semifinals March 15	Championship March 16
1.	Georgetown †	14–4	24–5	2-1 vs. LOU and MARQ	Bye	Bye	vs. Cincinnati W 43–62	vs. Syracuse L 58–55	
2.	Louisville †	14–4	26–5	1-1 vs. GTWN and MARQ	Bye	Bye	vs Villanova W 74–55	vs Notre Dame W 69–57	vs Syracuse W 78–61
3.	Marquette †	14–4	23–7	1-2 vs. GTWN and LOU	Bye	Bye	vs Notre Dame L 73–65		
4.	Pittsburgh †	12–6	24–7		Bye	Bye	vs Syracuse L 59–62		
5.	Syracuse#	11–7	23–8	1-0 vs ND	Bye	vs Seton Hall W 75–63	vs Pittsburgh W 62–59	vs Georgetown W 58–55	vs Louisville L 61–78
6.	Notre Dame#	11–7	23–8	0-1 vs SYR	Bye	vs Rutgers W 69–61	vs Marquette W 73–65	vs Louisville L 57–69	
7.	Villanova#	10–8	19–12		Bye	vs St. John's W 66–53	vs Louisville L 55–74		
8.	Providence#	9-9	17–13	1-0 vs CIN	Bye	vs Cincinnati L 44–61			
9.	Cincinnati	9-9	21–10	0-1 vs. PROV	Bye	vs Providence W 61–44	vs Georgetown L 43–62		
10.	St. John's	8–10	16–14		Bye	vs Villanova L 53–66			
11.	Rutgers	5–13	14–15		vs DePaul W 76–57	vs Notre Dame L 61–69			
12.	Seton Hall	3–15	14–17		vs South Florida W 46-42 OT	vs Syracuse L 63–75			
13.	South Florida	3–15	12–18		vs Seton Hall L 42-46 OT				
14.	DePaul	2–16	11–20		vs Rutgers L 57–76				
‡ – Big East regular season champions, and tournament No. 1 seed. † – Received a double-bye in the conference tournament. # – Received a single-bye in the conference tournament. Overall records include all games played in the Big East tournament. Connecticut is ineligible due to Academic Progress Rate violations.

=== NCAA tournament ===
Seed	Region	School	Second Round	Third Round	Sweet 16	Elite Eight	Final Four	Championship
1	Midwest	Louisville	#16 North Carolina A&T - Mar. 21, Lexington - W, 79–48	#8 Colorado State - Mar. 23, Lexington - W, 82–56	#12 Oregon - Mar. 29, Indianapolis - W, 77–69	#2 Duke - Mar. 31, Indianapolis - W, 85–63	#9 Wichita State - Apr. 6, Atlanta - W, 72–68	#4 Michigan - Apr. 8, Atlanta - W, 82–76
2	South	Georgetown	#15 Florida Gulf Coast - Mar. 22, Philadelphia - L, 68–78					
3	East	Marquette	#14 Davidson - Mar. 21, Lexington - W, 59–58	#6 Butler - Mar. 23, Lexington - W, 74–72	#2 Miami - Mar. 28, Washington, D.C. - W, 71–61	#4 Syracuse - Mar. 30, Washington, D.C. - L, 39–55		
4	East	Syracuse	#13 Montana - Mar. 21, San Jose - W, 81–34	#12 California - Mar. 23, San Jose - W, 66–60	#1 Indiana - Mar. 28, Washington, D.C. - W, 61–50	#3 Marquette - Mar. 30, Washington, D.C. - W, 55–39	#4 Michigan - Apr. 6, Atlanta - L, 56–61	
7	West	Notre Dame	#10 Iowa State - Mar. 22, Dayton - L, 58–76					
8	West	Pittsburgh	#9 Wichita State - Mar. 21, Salt Lake City - L, 55–73					
9	South	Villanova	#8 North Carolina - Mar. 22, Kansas City - L, 71–78					
10	Midwest	Cincinnati	#7 Creighton - Mar. 22, Philadelphia - L, 63–67					
	8 Bids	W-L (%):	3–5 .375	3–0 1.000	3–0 1.000	2–1 .667	1–1 .500	TOTAL: 13–7 .650

=== National Invitation tournament ===
Seed	Bracket	School	First Round	Second Round	Quarterfinals	Semifinals	Finals
4	Kentucky	Providence	#5 Charlotte - Mar. 20, Providence - W, 75–66	#8 Robert Morris - Mar. 25, Providence - W, 77–68	#2 Baylor - Mar. 27, Waco - L, 68–79		
5	Virginia	St. John's	#4 St. Joseph's - Mar. 19, Philadelphia - W, 63–61	#1 Virginia - Mar. 24, Charlottesville - L, 50–68			
	2 Bids	W-L (%):	2–0 1.000	1–1 .500	0–1 .000	0–0 –	TOTAL: 3–2 .600

== Awards and honors ==
=== Conference awards and teams ===
The Player of the Year, Coach of the Year, Rookie of the Year, and Scholar Athlete of the Year awards are announced, after the conclusion of the first session of the Big East tournament. The remainder of the individual awards are announced at the conclusion of the regular season.

2013 Big East Men's Basketball Individual Awards
Award	Recipient(s)
Player of the Year	Otto Porter, Georgetown
Coach of the Year	John Thompson III, Georgetown
Defensive Player of the Year	Gorgui Dieng, Louisville
Rookie of the Year	JaKarr Sampson, St. John's
Scholar-Athlete of the Year	Peyton Siva, Louisville
Most Improved Player	Kadeem Batts, Providence; Michael Carter-Williams, Syracuse
Sixth Man Award	Davante Gardner, Marquette
Sportsmanship Award	Junior Cadougan, Marquette

2013 All-Big East Men's Basketball Teams
First Team	Second Team	Third Team	Honorable Mention	All Rookie Team
Shabazz Napier, G., CONN; Otto Porter†, F., GEO; Gorgui Dieng, F./C., LOU; Russ Smith, F., LOU; Jack Cooley, F./C., ND; Bryce Cotton, G., PROV	Sean Kilpatrick, G., CINC; Vander Blue, G., MAR; Jerian Grant, G., ND; Michael Carter-Williams, G., SYR; C. J. Fair, F., SYR	Markel Starks, G., GTWN; Peyton Siva, G., LOU; Tray Woodall, F./C., PITT; Brandon Triche, G., SYR; JayVaughn Pinkston, F., PRI	Davante Gardner, F., MARQ; Kadeem Batts, G., PROV; JaKarr Sampson, F., SJU; Fuquan Edwin, G., SET	Omar Calhoun, G., CONN; D'Vauntes Smith-Rivera, G., GTWN; Steven Adams, C., PITT; Chris Obekpa, C., SJU; JaKarr Sampson†, F., SJU; Ryan Arcidiacono†, G., VILL
† - denotes unanimous selection

=== National awards and teams ===
==== Players ====
===== Award finalists =====
Wooden	Naismith

=== NBA draft ===
Several players from the conference declared early for the NBA draft. Several players were among the 60 players invited to the 2013 NBA Draft Combine.

The following list includes all Big East players who were drafted in the 2013 NBA draft.

Player	Position	School	Round	Pick	Team
Otto Porter	SF	Georgetown	1	3	Washington Wizards
Michael Carter-Williams	PG	Syracuse	1	11	Philadelphia 76ers
Steven Adams	C	Pittsburgh	1	12	Oklahoma City Thunder
Gorgui Dieng	C	Louisville	1	21	Utah Jazz
Ricky Ledo	SG	Providence	2	43	Milwaukee Bucks
Peyton Siva	PG	Louisville	2	56	Detroit Pistons

== See also ==
- 2012–13 NCAA Division I men's basketball season
- 2012–13 Cincinnati Bearcats men's basketball team
- 2012–13 Connecticut Huskies men's basketball team
- 2012–13 DePaul Blue Demons men's basketball team
- 2012–13 Georgetown Hoyas men's basketball team
- 2012–13 Louisville Cardinals men's basketball team
- 2012–13 Marquette Golden Eagles men's basketball team
- 2012–13 Notre Dame Fighting Irish men's basketball team
- 2012–13 Pittsburgh Panthers men's basketball team
- 2012–13 Providence Friars men's basketball team
- 2012–13 Rutgers Scarlet Knights men's basketball team
- 2012–13 Seton Hall Pirates men's basketball team
- 2012–13 St. John's Red Storm men's basketball team
- 2012–13 South Florida Bulls men's basketball team
- 2012–13 Syracuse Orange men's basketball team
- 2012–13 Villanova Wildcats men's basketball team

== See also ==
- 2012-13 NCAA Division I men's basketball season
