= 2012–13 Connecticut Huskies men's basketball team =

American college basketball season

2012–13 Connecticut Huskies men's basketball

Armed Forces Classic champions
- Conference: Big East Conference
- Record: 20–10 (10–8 Big East)
- Head coach: Kevin Ollie (1st season)
- Assistant coaches: George Blaney; Glen Miller; Karl Hobbs
- Home arena: Harry A. Gampel Pavilion; XL Center

2012–13 Big East men's basketball standings
	Conf.				Overall
Team	W		L	PCT	W		L	PCT
No. 2 Louisville†**	14	–	4	.778	35	–	5	.875
No. 8 Georgetown	14	–	4	.778	25	–	7	.781
No. 15 Marquette	14	–	4	.778	26	–	9	.743
No. 20 Pittsburgh	12	–	6	.667	24	–	9	.727
No. 16 Syracuse	11	–	7	.611	30	–	10	.750
No. 23 Notre Dame	11	–	7	.611	25	–	10	.714
Villanova	10	–	8	.556	20	–	14	.588
Connecticut*	10	–	8	.556	20	–	10	.667
Cincinnati	9	–	9	.500	22	–	12	.647
Providence	9	–	9	.500	19	–	15	.559
St. John's	8	–	10	.444	17	–	16	.515
Rutgers	5	–	13	.278	15	–	16	.484
Seton Hall	3	–	15	.167	15	–	18	.455
South Florida	3	–	15	.167	12	–	19	.387
DePaul	2	–	16	.111	11	–	21	.344
† 2013 Big East tournament winner As of March 30, 2013; Rankings from AP Poll; *Ineligible for postseason play due to APR penalties.

The 2012–13 Connecticut Huskies men's basketball team represented the University of Connecticut in the 2012–2013 NCAA Division I basketball season. The Huskies split their home games between the XL Center in Hartford, Connecticut, and the Harry A. Gampel Pavilion on the UConn campus in Storrs, Connecticut. The Huskies are a member of the Big East Conference. This season marked the first for new head coach Kevin Ollie, a former Husky, who replaced Jim Calhoun, who retired in September 2012 after 26 seasons as head coach.

== Previous season ==
The Huskies finished the 2011–12 season 20–14 overall, including 8–10 in Big East play. The Huskies, reigning champions of the 2011 NCAA Men's Division I Basketball Tournament were eliminated in the first round of the 2012 tournament to #8 seed Iowa State.

== Preseason developments ==
After the 2011–12 season, the Huskies were barred from postseason play for 2012–13 due to several years of poor Academic Progress Rate (APR) scores. This meant that the last regular season game would be the final game the team would play for the season, regardless of conference record. They had already lost two scholarships for the 2011–12 season due to APR sanctions.

As a result of the postseason ban, rising senior forward Alex Oriakhi announced he would transfer to Missouri for his final season of eligibility. Under NCAA rules, he can play immediately at Missouri because Connecticut's postseason ban covers his entire remaining eligibility.

Two other players transferred. Redshirt freshman Michael Bradley initially planned to transfer to Western Kentucky, but was denied immediate eligibility by the NCAA, and chose instead to transfer to Vincennes, an Indiana junior college. Rising junior Roscoe Smith was released from his scholarship and ultimately transferred to UNLV.

=== Departures ===
Name	Number	Pos.	Height	Weight	Year	Hometown	Notes
Kyle Bailey	21	Guard	6'3"	175	Senior	Lancaster, New Hampshire	Graduated
Michael Bradley	25	Forward-center	6'10"	235	Freshman	Chattanooga, Tennessee	Transferred to Vincennes
P. J. Cochrane	14	Guard	6'2"	200	Senior	Newtown, Connecticut	Graduated
Andre Drummond	12	Center	6'10"	275	Freshman	Middletown, Connecticut	Declared for NBA draft
Jeremy Lamb	3	Guard-forward	6'5"	185	Sophomore	Norcross, Georgia	Declared for NBA draft
Alex Oriakhi	34	Forward-center	6'9"	245	Junior	Lowell, Massachusetts	Transferred to Missouri
Roscoe Smith	22	Forward	6'8"	205	Sophomore	Baltimore, Maryland	Transferred to UNLV
Ethan Waite	40	Guard	5'10"	155	Senior	East Hartford, Connecticut	Graduated

== Roster ==
2012–13 Connecticut Huskies men's basketball team
Players
Coaches

Pos.	#	Name	Height	Weight	Year	Hometown
C	1	Enosch Wolf	7 ft 1 in (2.16 m)	260 lb (118 kg)	Jr	Göttingen, Germany
F	2	DeAndre Daniels	6 ft 8 in (2.03 m)	195 lb (88 kg)	So	Los Angeles, CA
F	3	Phillip Nolan	6 ft 9 in (2.06 m)	203 lb (92 kg)	Fr	Milwaukee, WI
G	4	Brendan Allen	6 ft 3 in (1.91 m)	187 lb (85 kg)	So	Windsor, CT
G/F	5	Niels Giffey	6 ft 7 in (2.01 m)	205 lb (93 kg)	Jr	Berlin, Germany
F	10	Tyler Olander	6 ft 9 in (2.06 m)	225 lb (102 kg)	Jr	Mansfield, CT
G	11	Ryan Boatright	6 ft 2 in (1.88 m)	165 lb (75 kg)	So	Aurora, IL
G	12	R. J. Evans	6 ft 3 in (1.91 m)	200 lb (91 kg)	RS Sr	Salem, CT
G	13	Shabazz Napier	6 ft 0 in (1.83 m)	170 lb (77 kg)	Jr	Randolph, MA
G	21	Omar Calhoun	6 ft 3 in (1.91 m)	185 lb (84 kg)	Fr	Brooklyn, NY
F	22	Leon Tolksdorf	6 ft 8 in (2.03 m)	220 lb (100 kg)	Fr	Berlin, Germany

Head coach

- Kevin Ollie

Assistant coach(es)

- George Blaney
- Glen Miller

Legend

- (C) Team captain
- (S) Suspended
- (I) Ineligible
- (W) Walk-on
- Injured
- Current redshirt

Roster
Last update: May 16, 2012

== Regular season ==
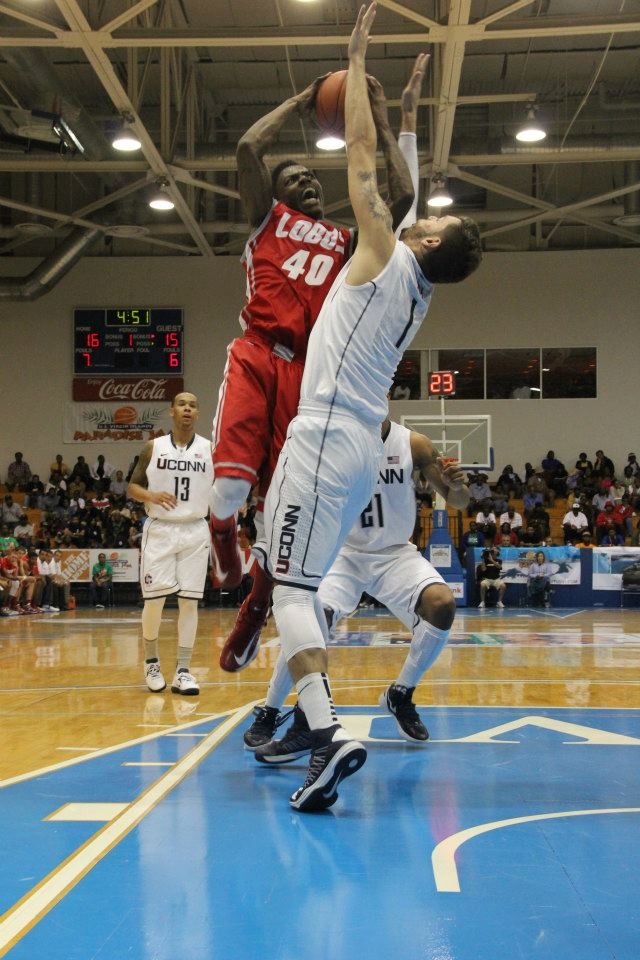
UConn's Enosch Wolf defends against New Mexico's Demetrius Walker at the 2012 Paradise Jam Championship game

The Huskies traveled to St. Thomas for the Paradise Jam tournament in mid-November. UConn faced Wake Forest in the first round and won 77–71. The second game matched the Huskies against in-state Quinnipiac, coached by Tom Moore, who spent 13 years as a member of the UConn coaching staff. UConn found itself in a ten-point deficit with under five minutes to go, and managed to tie the score by the end of regulation. The game went to two overtimes before UConn prevailed 89–83.

In the Championship game, UConn came from nine points down to take a brief two-point lead with just over two minutes to go, but gave up nine straight points, and ended up with the loss 66–60. The Lobos hit all 21 of their free throw attempts in the game, leaving UConn in the runner-up position.

Despite ranking eighth in the conference standings with a 10-8 record (20-10 overall), the Huskies were forced to end their season early due to their full postseason ban, meaning they would miss the Big East tournament and all other postseason competitions, including the NCAA championship.

== Schedule ==
Date time, TV	Rank^{#}	Opponent^{#}	Result	Record	Site (attendance) city, state
Exhibition
November 1, 2012*; 7:00 pm		American International	W 78–63	–	Harry A. Gampel Pavilion (5,349); Storrs, CT
November 6, 2012*; 1:00 pm		UMass Lowell	W 100–62	–	XL Center (5,538); Hartford, CT
Regular Season
November 9, 2012*; 5:30 pm, ESPN		vs. No. 14 Michigan State; Armed Forces Classic	W 66–62	1–0	Ramstein Air Base (3,086); Kaiserslautern, Germany
November 13, 2012*; 7:00 pm, SNY	No. 23	Vermont	W 67–49	2–0	Harry A. Gampel Pavilion (7,962); Storrs, CT
November 16, 2012*; 6:30 pm, CBSSN	No. 23	vs. Wake Forest; Paradise Jam Quarterfinals	W 77–71	3–0	Sports and Fitness Center (2,673); Saint Thomas, VI
November 18, 2012*; 9:00 pm, CBSSN	No. 23	vs. Quinnipiac; Paradise Jam semifinals	W 89–83 ^{2OT}	4–0	Sports and Fitness Center (2,875); Saint Thomas, VI
November 19, 2012*; 10:00 pm, CBSSN	No. 21	vs. New Mexico; Paradise Jam Championship	L 60–66	4–1	Sports and Fitness Center (3,022); Saint Thomas, VI
November 25, 2012*; 4:00 pm, SNY	No. 21	Stony Brook	W 73–62	5–1	Harry A. Gampel Pavilion (8,474); Storrs, CT
November 29, 2012*; 7:00 pm, SNY		New Hampshire	W 61–53	6–1	XL Center (8,705); Hartford, CT
December 4, 2012*; 9:00 pm, ESPN		vs. No. 25 NC State; Jimmy V Classic	L 65–69	6–2	Madison Square Garden (11,840); Manhattan, NY
December 7, 2012*; 7:00 pm, SNY		Harvard	W 57–49	7–2	Harry A. Gampel Pavilion (9,113); Storrs, CT
December 17, 2012*; 7:00 pm, SNY		Maryland–Eastern Shore	W 84–50	8–2	XL Center (8,841); Hartford, CT
December 21, 2012*; 7:00 pm, SNY		Fordham	W 88–73	9–2	XL Center (10,265); Hartford, CT
December 29, 2012*; 7:30 pm, ESPN2		Washington	W 61–53	10–2	XL Center (12,720); Hartford, CT
January 1, 2013; 8:00 pm, ESPNU		at Marquette	L 76–82 ^{OT}	10–3 (0–1)	Bradley Center (14,159); Milwaukee, WI
January 8, 2013; 7:00 pm, Big East Network/SNY		DePaul	W 99–78	11–3 (1–1)	Harry A. Gampel Pavilion (9,156); Storrs, CT
January 12, 2013; 2:00 pm, Big East Network/SNY		at No. 17 Notre Dame	W 65–58	12–3 (2–1)	Joyce Center (9,149); Notre Dame, IN
January 14, 2013; 7:00 pm, ESPN		#1 Louisville	L 58–73	12–4 (2–2)	XL Center (14,287); Hartford, CT
January 19, 2013; 12:00 pm, ESPN2		at Pittsburgh	L 61–69	12–5 (2–3)	Petersen Events Center (12,510); Pittsburgh, PA
January 27, 2013; 2:00 pm, Big East Network/SNY		Rutgers	W 66–54	13–5 (3–3)	XL Center (12,768); Hartford, CT
January 31, 2013; 7:00 pm, ESPN2		at Providence	W 82–79 ^{OT}	14–5 (4–3)	Dunkin' Donuts Center (10,180); Providence RI
February 3, 2013; 2:00 pm, Big East Network/SNY		South Florida	W 69–64 ^{OT}	15–5 (5–3)	Harry A. Gampel Pavilion (9,205); Storrs, CT
February 6, 2013; 7:00 pm, ESPNU		at St. John's	L 65–71	15–6 (5–4)	Madison Square Garden (8,441); Manhattan, NY
February 10, 2013; 12:00 pm, Big East Network/SNY		at Seton Hall	W 78–67	16–6 (6–4)	Prudential Center (7,634); Newark, NJ
February 13, 2013; 7:00 pm, ESPN		#6 Syracuse; Rivalry	W 66–58	17–6 (7–4)	XL Center (13,518); Hartford, CT
February 16, 2013; 12:00 pm, ESPN		Villanova	L 61–70	17–7 (7–5)	XL Center (15,165); Hartford, CT
February 21, 2013; 7:00 pm, ESPN		Cincinnati	W 73–66 ^{OT}	18–7 (8–5)	XL Center (11,131); Hartford, CT
February 23, 2013; 8:00 pm, Big East Network/SNY		at DePaul	W 81–69	19–7 (9–5)	Allstate Arena (8,662); Rosemont, IL
February 27, 2013; 7:00 pm, ESPN2		#7 Georgetown; Rivalry	L 78–79 ^{2OT}	19–8 (9–6)	Harry A. Gampel Pavilion (10,167); Storrs, CT
March 2, 2013; 2:00 pm, Big East Network/SNY		at Cincinnati	L 56–61	19–9 (9–7)	Fifth Third Arena (12,432); Cincinnati, OH
March 6, 2013; 9:08 pm, ESPNU		at South Florida	L 51–65	19–10 (9–8)	USF Sun Dome (5,198); Tampa, FL
March 9, 2013; 12:00 pm, ESPNU		Providence	W 63–59 ^{OT}	20–10 (10–8)	Harry A. Gampel Pavilion (10,167); Storrs, CT
*Non-conference game. ^{#}Rankings from AP Poll. (#) Tournament seedings in parentheses. All times are in Eastern Time.

== Rankings ==
Ranking movements Legend: RV = Received votes
	Week																			
Poll	Pre	1	2	3	4	5	6	7	8	9	10	11	12	13	14	15	16	17	18	Final
AP	23	23																		
Coaches	RV	RV																		

== See also ==
- 2012–13 Connecticut Huskies women's basketball team
