= Academic Progress Rate =

Measure of athletic student graduation

The Academic Progress Rate (APR) is a measure introduced by the National Collegiate Athletic Association (NCAA), the nonprofit association that organizes the athletic programs of many colleges and universities in the United States and Canada, to track student-athletes' chances of graduation. The APR is a term-by-term measure of eligibility and retention for Division I student-athletes that was developed as an early indicator of eventual graduation rates.

It was introduced in the wake of concerns that the majority of athletes were not graduating with qualifications to prepare them for life.

== Background ==
The mandatory publication of graduation rates came into effect in 1990 as a consequence of the "Student Right-to-Know Act," which attempted to create an environment in which universities would become more devoted to academics and hold athletes more accountable for academic success. However, the graduation rates established by the National Collegiate Athletic Association (NCAA) showed poor results, for example they reported that among students who entered college between 1993 and 1996 only 51 percent of football players graduated within 6 years and 41 percent of basketball players.

Feeling pressure to improve these poor rates, the NCAA instituted reforms in 2004, including the Academic Progress Rate (APR), a new method for gauging the academic progress of student athletes. It was put into place in order to aid in the NCAA's goal for student-athletes to graduate with meaningful degrees preparing them for life. The principal data collector was Thomas Paskus, the principal research scientist for the NCAA. Originally, if a program's four-year average APR fell below 925, that would trigger sanctions like scholarship losses, and a four-year APR of 900 or lower triggered "historical penalties" like postseason bans. In 2011, the NCAA voted to raise the minimum APR that triggers penalties to 930.

== Functions ==
The APR measures how scholarship student-athletes are performing term by term throughout the school year. It is a composite team measurement based upon how individual team members do academically. Teams that don't make the 930 APR threshold are subject to sanctions. The NCAA works closely with the schools that do not meet the threshold in order to improve them. When a school has APR challenges, it may be encouraged or even required to present an academic improvement plan to the NCAA. In reviewing these plans, the national office staff encourages schools to work with other campus units to achieve a positive outcome. The staff also works with APR-challenged schools to create reasonable timelines for improvement. While eligibility requirements make the individual student-athlete accountable, the APR creates a level of responsibility for the university.

== Measurement ==
Teams that fail to achieve an APR score of 930—equivalent to a 50% graduation rate—may be penalized. A perfect score is 1000. The scores are calculated as follows:

Each student-athlete receiving athletically related financial aid earns one retention point for staying in school and one eligibility point for being academically eligible. A team's total points are divided by the points possible and then multiplied by 1000 to yield the team's APR score.

Example: An NCAA Division I Football Bowl Subdivision (FBS) team awards the full complement of 85 grants-in-aid. If 80 student-athletes remain in school and academically eligible, three remain in school but are academically ineligible and two drop out academically ineligible, the team earns 163 of 170 possible points for that term. Divide 163 by 170 and multiply by 1000, yielding the team's APR for that term: 959.

The NCAA calculates the rate as a rolling, four-year figure that takes into account all the points student-athletes could earn for remaining in school and academically eligible during that period. Teams that do not earn an APR above specific benchmarks face penalties ranging from scholarship reductions to more severe sanctions like restrictions on scholarships and practice time.

== Sanctions ==
Teams that score below 930 and have a student-athlete who both failed academically and left school can lose scholarships (up to 10 percent of their scholarships each year) under the immediate penalty structure.

Teams with Academic Progress Rates below 900 face additional sanctions, increasing in severity for each consecutive year the team fails to meet the standard.

Year 1: a public warning letter for poor performance

Year 2: restrictions on scholarships and practice time

Year 3: loss of postseason competition for the team (such as a bowl game or the men's basketball tournament)

Year 4: restricted membership status for an institution. The school's entire athletics program is penalized and will not be considered a part of Division I.

The first penalties under the APR system were scheduled to be announced in December 2005. Starting with the 2008–09 academic year, bans from postseason competition were added to the penalty structure. The most severe penalty available is a one-year suspension of NCAA membership, which has not yet been assessed as of 2010–11.

Prior to 2010–11, only four teams had received postseason bans. The results of the NCAA's APR report for that year, which covered 2006–07 through 2009–10, saw eight teams receive that penalty—five in men's basketball and three in football. Most notably, Southern University became the first school ever to receive APR-related postseason bans in two sports. The highest-profile penalty in that year's cycle was handed down to defending NCAA men's basketball champion Connecticut. The Huskies lost two scholarships for the 2011–12 season due to APR violations. UConn was barred from postseason play in 2012–13 due to APR penalties.

For the 2014 football season, Idaho and UNLV received postseason bans due to low four-year APR averages. However, UNLV submitted "updated" APR score to the NCAA raising the score needed for postseason eligibility.

On May 6, 2025, it was announced that the Akron Zips were ineligible for postseason play, due to their fourth straight season of low APR of 914. The ban was lifted in 2026 and the team resumed 20 hour practice weeks after previously having been restricted to 16.

== Reform ==
NCAA college presidents met in Indianapolis in August 2011 to discuss a reform on the APR because of the poor academic performance by student athletes. The NCAA Board of Directors, on August 11, voted to ban Division I athletic teams from postseason play if their four-year academic progress rate failed to reach 930.

The new policy took effect in the 2012–13 academic year; however, institutions were given a period of three years to align their APR with the new standard. The postseason restrictions were as follows:

2012–13 postseason: 900 four-year average or 930 average over most recent two years

2013–14 postseason: 930 four-year average or 940 average over most recent two years

2015–16 postseason and beyond: 930 four-year average

At the time, the APR benchmark for postseason play was 900, so this was a significant increase, which could have resulted in serious consequences for some institutions if they failed to improve their APR.

=== Reform effects ===
==== On football ====
There are many questions regarding how the NCAA will enforce the new policy for football. The College Football Playoff (CFP), and formerly the Bowl Championship Series (BCS), is its own entity and decides the college football postseason, thus making them the governing body for college football. President Gary Ransdell said there is uncertainty on how the new standard relates to the BCS. "The BCS is an independently run enterprise, yet it involves NCAA member institutions," he said. "So does this 930 rule also determine eligibility for BCS games? I think that's yet to be ironed out."

Some NCAA institutions participate in football leagues, other than the BCS, which are organized by the NCAA and these reforms would apply to. In the 2011–12 academic year there were 17 teams in the FBS league with APRs below 930 and 37 teams in the FCS league. If these programs do not find a way to improve their APR then they will suffer postseason bans.

Under NCAA postseason rules, tiebreaker procedures based on a school's Academic Progress Rate (APR) are used in emergency situations if there are not enough teams with six wins and at least .500 or better to qualify for postseason games (bowl eligibility). There were 41 games in the 2021–22 NCAA football bowl games, and 80 eligible teams. One slot was used under the 13-game rule, and a second slot was given to Rutgers based on APR.

==== On men's basketball ====
The APR's flaws are highlighted in men's basketball. "Syracuse's Jim Boeheim suffered the two-scholarship hit last summer, and in doing so publicly upbraided the APR for taking into account the departures of Eric Devendorf, Jonny Flynn and Paul Harris for the NBA draft, all three of whom left campus to prepare for the NBA event without fulfilling their spring semester requirements." Many college basketball players leave before they graduate, and the ones that leave in bad academic standing cause the APR to go down. This issue is seen throughout college basketball.

To exemplify this phenomenon for collegiate basketball: if the 930 postseason ban had been in effect for the 2011–12 season, then 99 teams would have received postseason bans.

== Adjustments ==
The NCAA does adjust APR, on a student-by-student basis, in two circumstances. One exception that can be made is for student-athletes who leave prior to graduation, while in good academic standing, to pursue a professional career. Another is for student-athletes who transfer to another school while meeting minimum academic requirements and student-athletes who return to graduate at a later date. Compiling college athletes' graduation rates stemmed partly from press coverage that 76 to 92 percent of professional athletes lacked college degrees and from revelations that some were functionally illiterate. In the 2010–11 cycle, the NCAA granted nearly 700 APR adjustments in the latter category, out of a total of over 6,400 Division I teams. (The APR is calculated based only on scholarship players already, not walk-ons) Numerous other sources, from sports conferences to schools themselves, document much lower graduation rates for college football and men's basketball and baseball players than for general students. Compounding matters is that only about 57 percent of all college students complete a bachelor's degree in six years.

=== Graduation success rate ===
As part of this strategy, the NCAA strives "to ensure the academic commitment of student-athletes and to increase the likelihood that they will earn degrees." Along these lines, in 2005 the NCAA formulated a tool called the Graduation Success Rate (GSR) for Division I schools. GSR basically removes athletes who leave an institution in good academic standing from the denominator, and adds those who transfer in and eventually graduate to the sample. Thus, GSR recognizes that college athletes (based at least partly on their interests and abilities) may take a different path to graduation than other full-time students and in some aspects is an accurate yardstick. The latest single-year GSR for all NCAA Division I athletes (who began college in 2004) was 82 percent. GSR for Division I FBS football was 67 percent, for men's basketball 66 percent, for women's basketball 84 percent, and for baseball 72 percent.

== APR compared to graduation standards ==
=== Federal graduation rate ===
Another indicator of the academic performance of student athletes is the Federal Graduation Rate, FGR, which is published by the university. In computing the FGR, the only data that is relevant is whether the student athlete graduates within six years of enrolling in the institution. This differs from the APR because it makes no distinction of the purpose a student has for leaving and whether or not they leave a university in good academic standing. If a student leaves their enrolled university to pursue a professional athletic career this counts the same under the FGR as someone who leaves because they failed out of school; on the other hand, by the APR standards a student that leaves while still in good academic standing receives one point out of two which distinguishes them from someone that left because of academic failure. With that in mind, FGR rates usually reflect a value lower than the APR at elite athletic institutions that consistently send athletes to the professional leagues prior to graduation.

=== Graduation success rate ===
The NCAA developed its graduation success rate, GSR, in response to criticism that the FGR understates the academic success of athletes because the FGR method does not take into account two important factors in college athletics:

- When student-athletes transfer from an institution before graduating and are in good academic standing (perhaps to transfer from an institution for more playing time or a different major).
- Those student-athletes who transfer to an institution (e.g. from a community college or another four-year college) and earn a degree.

The FGR treats transfers as nongraduates for the original institution the student-athlete attended, even if that student-athlete later graduates from another institution. Also, the FGR does not include that student-athlete in the graduation rates at the new institution where he/she does graduate. Therefore, once a student-athlete transfers to another school he/she is no longer recognized in the calculated graduation rate. The GSR takes into account both factors and gives credit to institutions for successful transfers, whether they are leaving or entering an institution.

== Potential misinterpretations ==
While the numbers represented in the APR have a certain significance, there can be misrepresentations for people unfamiliar with what the APR is showing. For example, the APR only applies to students that receive athletic financial aid, which is by no means all varsity athletes at a university. NCAA's 1,265 member colleges and universities report that they have more than 355,000 student-athletes playing each year. Approximately 36% of these NCAA student-athletes receive a share of the $1 billion earmarked for athletic scholarships. Another common misuse of the data occurs when APR results are compared between universities. This is usually not a valid comparison unless it is viewed alongside the graduation rates for non-athletes at the institution. For example, one institution may have an APR representing that only 50% of athletes are on track to graduate which seems like athletes are under performing at the university. However, if the graduation rate for non-athletes is also 50% then the low graduation rate for the athletes is not a student-athlete problem, but a university-wide problem.

Furthermore, it is not always relevant to compare APR scores across universities because the academic rigors between universities differ. For example, at some high performing academic universities freshman struggle with eligibility because the workload is hard to deal with initially, but in the end, those students find academic success.
