= 2015–16 Syracuse Orange men's basketball team =

American college basketball season

2015–16 Syracuse Orange men's basketball

Battle 4 Atlantis champions

NCAA tournament, Final Four
- Conference: Atlantic Coast Conference

Ranking
- Coaches: No. 10
- Record: 23–14 (9–9 ACC)
- Head coach: Jim Boeheim (40th season)
- Assistant coaches: Mike Hopkins; Adrian Autry; Gerry McNamara
- Home arena: Carrier Dome

2015–16 ACC men's basketball standings
	Conf.				Overall
Team	W		L	PCT	W		L	PCT
No. 3 North Carolina †	14	–	4	.778	33	–	7	.825
No. 4 Virginia	13	–	5	.722	29	–	8	.784
No. 10 Miami (FL)	13	–	5	.722	27	–	8	.771
No. 16 Louisville*	12	–	6	.667	23	–	8	.742
Notre Dame	11	–	7	.611	24	–	12	.667
No. 19 Duke	11	–	7	.611	25	–	11	.694
Virginia Tech	10	–	8	.556	20	–	15	.571
Clemson	10	–	8	.556	17	–	14	.548
Pittsburgh	9	–	9	.500	21	–	12	.636
Syracuse	9	–	9	.500	23	–	14	.622
Georgia Tech	8	–	10	.444	21	–	15	.583
Florida State	8	–	10	.444	20	–	14	.588
NC State	5	–	13	.278	16	–	17	.485
Wake Forest	2	–	16	.111	11	–	20	.355
Boston College	0	–	18	.000	7	–	25	.219
† 2016 ACC tournament winner * Ineligible for both the 2016 ACC tournament and the 2016 NCAA tournament due to self-imposed postseason ban. Rankings from AP poll

The 2015–16 Syracuse Orange men's basketball team represented Syracuse University during the 2015–16 NCAA Division I men's basketball season. The Orange were led by 40th-year head coach Jim Boeheim and played its home games at the Carrier Dome in Syracuse, New York. They were third year members of the Atlantic Coast Conference (ACC). The Orange finished the season 23–14, 9–9 in ACC play to finish in a tie for 9th place. They lost to Pittsburgh in the second round of the ACC tournament. They received an at-large bid to the NCAA tournament as a #10 seed where they defeated Dayton, Middle Tennessee, Gonzaga, and Virginia to reach the Final Four for the sixth time in school history. At the Final Four, the Orange lost to North Carolina.

== Previous season ==
The Orange finished the 2014–15 season with a record of 18–13, 9–9 to finish in 8th place in ACC play. Syracuse did not participate in the postseason due to a self-imposed postseason ban as a response to an ongoing NCAA investigation into potential past infractions by the team. Syracuse University initiated the case, which includes academics, when it self-reported potential athletic department violations to the NCAA in 2007. School officials said that none of the conduct occurred after 2012, and no current student-athlete is involved. The ban included the NCAA tournament, ACC tournament and NIT.

== Departures ==
Name	Number	Pos.	Height	Weight	Year	Hometown	Notes
B. J. Johnson	2	F	6'6"	175	Sophomore	Ardmore, PA	Transferred to La Salle
Carter Sanderson	3	G	6'2"	185	Senior	Nashville, TN	Graduated
Ron Patterson	4	G	6'2"	200	Freshman	Broad Ripple, IN	Transferred to IUPUI
Chris McCullough	5	F	6'10"	220	Freshman	Bronx, NY	Entered 2015 NBA draft
Rakeem Christmas	25	F	6'9"	242	Senior	Philadelphia, PA	Graduated/2015 NBA draft
Albert Nassar	33	F	6'6"	195	Senior	Stuart, FL	Graduate transfer to Nova Southeastern

== Recruits ==
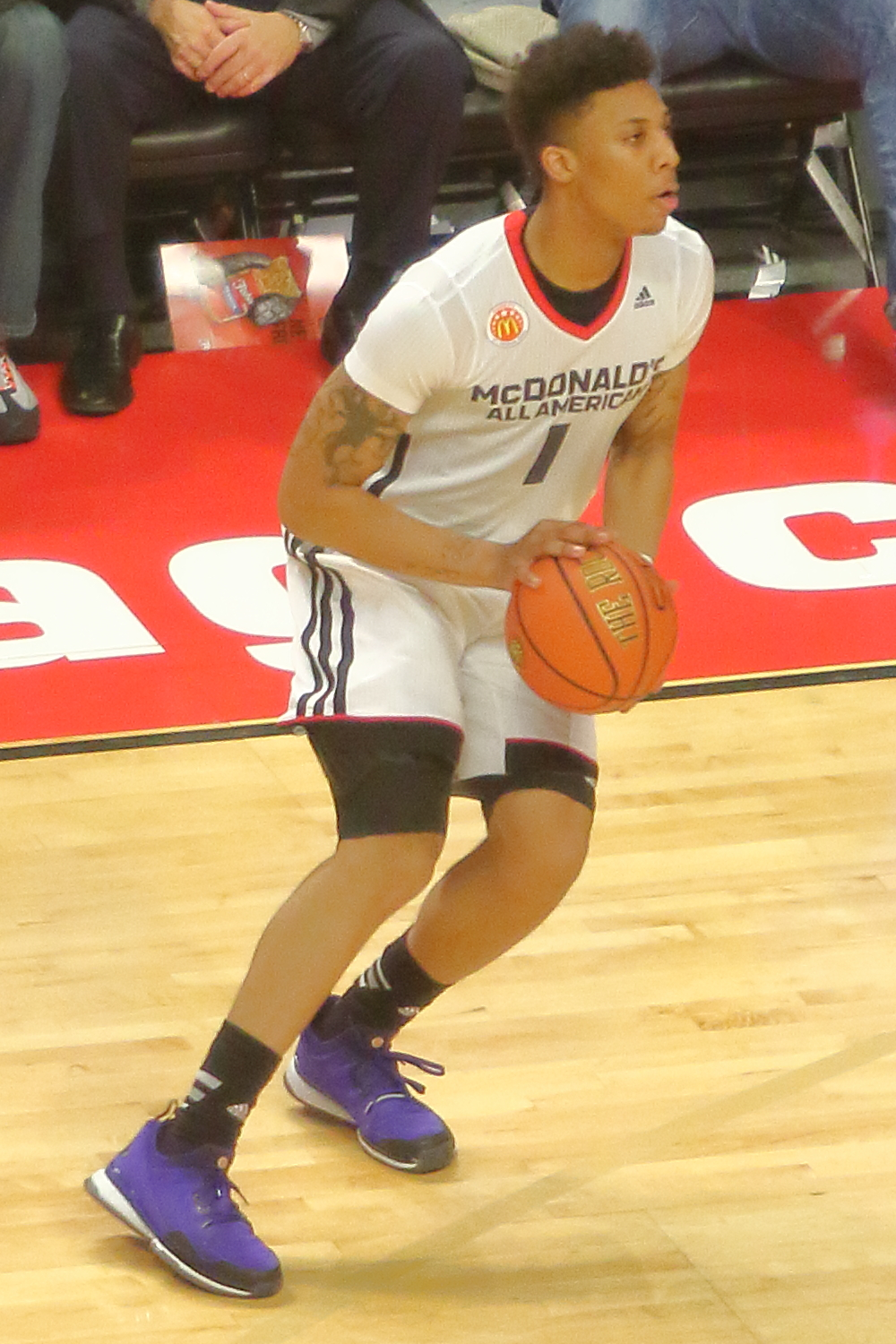
Malachi Richardson at the 2015 McDonald's All-American Boys Game

College recruiting information
Name	Hometown	School	Height	Weight	Commit date
Malachi Richardson; SG	Hamilton, NJ	Trenton Catholic Academy	6 ft 5 in (1.96 m)	190 lb (86 kg)	Dec 13, 2013
Malachi Richardson; SG	Recruit ratings: Scout: Rivals: (95)				
Tyler Lydon; PF	Pine Plains, NY	Brewster Academy	6 ft 8 in (2.03 m)	181 lb (82 kg)	Oct 17, 2013
Tyler Lydon; PF	Recruit ratings: Scout: Rivals: (83)				
Franklin Howard; SG	Suitland, MD	Paul VI High School	6 ft 5 in (1.96 m)	185 lb (84 kg)	Apr 14, 2014
Franklin Howard; SG	Recruit ratings: Scout: Rivals: (81)				
Overall recruit ranking:
Note: In many cases, Scout, Rivals, 247Sports, On3, and ESPN may conflict in their listings of height and weight.; In these cases, the average was taken. ESPN grades are on a 100-point scale.; Sources: "2015 Syracuse Signees". Rivals.; "2015 Syracuse Signees". Scout.; "2015 Syracuse Signees". ESPN.; "Scout.com Team Recruiting Rankings". Scout.; "2015 Team Ranking". Rivals.

== Roster ==
2015–16 Syracuse Orange men's basketball team
Players
Coaches

Pos.	#	Name	Height	Weight	Year	Previous school	Hometown
F	0	Michael Gbinije	6 ft 7 in (2.01 m)	200 lb (91 kg)	Sr	Benedictine College Prep	Richmond, Virginia
G	1	Franklin Howard	6 ft 4 in (1.93 m)	190 lb (86 kg)	Fr	Paul IV	Suitland, Maryland
G	3	Shaun Belbey (W)	5 ft 10 in (1.78 m)	165 lb (75 kg)	Fr	Christian Brothers Academy	Brick, New Jersey
F	4	Mike Sutton (W)	6 ft 2 in (1.88 m)	194 lb (88 kg)	So	Norwich	Norwich, New York
G	10	Trevor Cooney	6 ft 4 in (1.93 m)	195 lb (88 kg)	Sr	Sanford	Wilmington, Delaware
G	11	Adrian Autry (W)	6 ft 0 in (1.83 m)	182 lb (83 kg)	Fr	Jamesville-DeWitt	Jamesville, New York
C	13	Paschal Chukwu	7 ft 2 in (2.18 m)	226 lb (103 kg)	Fr	Fairfield Prep	Westport, Connecticut
G	14	Kaleb Joseph	6 ft 3 in (1.91 m)	180 lb (82 kg)	So	Cushing Academy	Nashua, New Hampshire
F	20	Tyler Lydon	6 ft 8 in (2.03 m)	210 lb (95 kg)	Fr	New Hampton School	Elizaville, New York
F	21	Tyler Roberson	6 ft 8 in (2.03 m)	226 lb (103 kg)	Jr	Roselle Catholic	Union, New Jersey
G	23	Malachi Richardson	6 ft 6 in (1.98 m)	205 lb (93 kg)	Fr	Trenton Catholic Academy	Trenton, New Jersey
G	25	Evan Dourdas (W)	6 ft 0 in (1.83 m)	160 lb (73 kg)	Fr	Jamesville-DeWitt	Jamesville, New York
C	32	DaJuan Coleman	6 ft 9 in (2.06 m)	268 lb (122 kg)	Sr	Jamesville-DeWitt	Jamesville, New York
G	33	Jonathan Radner (W)	5 ft 10 in (1.78 m)	168 lb (76 kg)	Fr	Berkley	Huntington Woods, Michigan
F	34	Doyin Akintobi-Adeyeye (W)	6 ft 6 in (1.98 m)	230 lb (104 kg)	Jr	Uniondale	Uniondale, New York
C	35	Chinoso Obokoh	6 ft 9 in (2.06 m)	215 lb (98 kg)	Sr	Bishop Kearney	Rochester, New York
G	54	Ky Feldman (W)	5 ft 10 in (1.78 m)	150 lb (68 kg)	Fr	Agoura	Agoura Hills, California
G	55	Christian White (W)	5 ft 10 in (1.78 m)	185 lb (84 kg)	Sr	Aquinas Institute	Rochester, New York

Head coach

- Jim Boeheim, 40th yr. (Syracuse, 1966)

Assistant coach(es)

- Mike Hopkins, 20th yr. (Syracuse, 1993)
- Gerry McNamara, 7th yr. (Syracuse, 2007)
- Adrian Autry, 5th yr. (Syracuse, 1994)

Legend

- (C) Team captain
- (S) Suspended
- (I) Ineligible
- (W) Walk-on
- Injured
- Current redshirt

Roster

== Schedule ==
Date time, TV	Rank^{#}	Opponent^{#}	Result	Record	High points	High rebounds	High assists	Site (attendance) city, state
Exhibition
Nov 2, 2015*; 7:00 pm, TWCS		Le Moyne	W 97–58		21 – Gbinije	10 – Roberson	5 – Cooney	Carrier Dome (8,168); Syracuse, NY
Nov 8, 2015*; 2:00 pm, TWCS		Florida Southern	W 96–54		18 – Richardson	7 – Coleman	5 – Gbinjie	Carrier Dome (7,760); Syracuse, NY
Non-conference regular season
Nov 13, 2015*; 7:00 pm, ESPN3		Lehigh	W 57–47	1–0	16 – Gbinije	11 – Lydon	3 – Cooney	Carrier Dome (21,286); Syracuse, NY
Nov 17, 2015*; 7:00 pm, RSN		St. Bonaventure	W 79–66	2–0	23 – Gbinije	12 – Roberson	6 – Gbinije	Carrier Dome (21,379); Syracuse, NY
Nov 21, 2015*; 7:00 pm, ESPN3		Elon; Battle 4 Atlantis Opening round	W 66–55	3–0	20 – Roberson	16 – Roberson	4 – Cooney	Carrier Dome (16,529); Syracuse, NY
Nov 25, 2015*; 2:30 pm, ESPN2		vs. Charlotte; Battle 4 Atlantis Quarterfinal	W 83–70	4–0	26 – Gbinije	11 – Roberson	5 – Cooney	Imperial Arena (1,744); Nassau, BS
Nov 26, 2015*; 3:30 pm, ESPN		vs. No. 18 UConn; Battle 4 Atlantis Semifinal / Rivalry	W 79–76	5–0	17 – Tied	12 – Lydon	7 – Gbinije	Imperial Arena (3,009); Nassau, BS
Nov 27, 2015*; 3:00 pm, ESPN		vs. No. 25 Texas A&M; Battle 4 Atlantis Championship	W 74–67	6–0	20 – Gbinije	8 – Lydon	5 – Cooney	Imperial Arena (2,309); Nassau, BS
Dec 2, 2015*; 7:15 pm, ESPN2	No. 14	Wisconsin; ACC–Big Ten Challenge	L 58–66 ^{OT}	6–1	19 – Gbinije	7 – Richardson	5 – Gbinije	Carrier Dome (22,360); Syracuse, NY
Dec 5, 2015*; 1:07 pm, FOX	No. 14	at Georgetown; Rivalry	L 72–79	6–2	23 – Gbinije	8 – Roberson	5 – Gbinije	Verizon Center (18,231); Washington, D.C.
Dec 8, 2015*; 7:00 pm, ESPNU		Colgate	W 78–51	7–2	17 – Tied	7 – Roberson	6 – Gbinije	Carrier Dome (21,201); Syracuse, NY
Dec 13, 2015*; 12:00 pm, FS1		at St. John's	L 72–84	7–3	21 – Gbinije	10 – Lydon	5 – Cooney	Madison Square Garden (13,473); New York City, NY
Dec 19, 2015*; 12:00 pm, RSN		Cornell	W 67–46	8–3	15 – Roberson	12 – Roberson	8 – Gbinije	Carrier Dome (18,295); Syracuse, NY
Dec 22, 2015*; 7:00 pm, ESPN3		Montana State	W 82–60	9–3	17 – Gbinije	7 – Lydon	5 – Gbinije	Carrier Dome (17,202); Syracuse, NY
Dec 27, 2015*; 2:00 pm, ESPNU		Texas Southern	W 80–67	10–3	15 – Gbinije	7 – Gbinije	4 – Gbinije	Carrier Dome (21,601); Syracuse, NY
ACC regular season
Dec 30, 2015; 9:00 pm, ESPN2		at Pittsburgh	L 61–72	10–4 (0–1)	15 – Tied	7 – Roberson	7 – Gbinije	Peterson Events Center (10,429); Pittsburgh, PA
Jan 2, 2016; 2:30 pm, ACCN		at No. 13 Miami (FL)	L 51–64	10–5 (0–2)	20 – Richardson	11 – Roberson	4 – Gbinije	Bank United Center (7,972); Coral Gables, FL
Jan 5, 2016; 8:00 pm, ACCN		Clemson	L 73–74 ^{OT}	10–6 (0–3)	22 – Gbinije	9 – Richardson	5 – Cooney	Carrier Dome (16,305); Syracuse, NY
Jan 9, 2016; 8:00 pm, ESPN		No. 6 North Carolina	L 73–84	10–7 (0–4)	27 – Cooney	7 – Tied	5 – Richardson	Carrier Dome (26,811); Syracuse, NY
Jan 13, 2016; 7:00 pm, RSN		Boston College	W 62–44	11–7 (1–4)	15 – Richardson	12 – Roberson	3 – Tied	Carrier Dome (16,701); Syracuse, NY
Jan 16, 2016; 12:00 pm, ACCN		at Wake Forest	W 83–55	12–7 (2–4)	25 – Cooney	13 – Roberson	3 – Cooney	LJVM Coliseum (11,592); Winston-Salem, NC
Jan 18, 2016; 7:00 pm, ESPN		at No. 20 Duke	W 64–62	13–7 (3–4)	14 – 4 Tied	20 – Roberson	9 – Gbinije	Cameron Indoor Stadium (9,314); Durham, NC
Jan 23, 2016; 12:00 pm, ESPN		at No. 13 Virginia	L 65–73	13–8 (3–5)	24 – Gbinije	7 – Roberson	3 – Gbinije	John Paul Jones Arena (13,305); Charlottesville, VA
Jan 28, 2016; 7:00 pm, ESPN2		No. 25 Notre Dame	W 81–66	14–8 (4–5)	22 – Cooney	9 – Roberson	5 – Gbinije	Carrier Dome (22,861); Syracuse, NY
Jan 30, 2016; 12:00 pm, ESPNU		Georgia Tech	W 60–57	15–8 (5–5)	16 – Gbinije	8 – Roberson	3 – Gbinije	Carrier Dome (25,235); Syracuse, NY
Feb 2, 2016; 8:00 pm, ACCN		Virginia Tech	W 68–60 ^{OT}	16–8 (6–5)	17 – Gbinije	15 – Roberson	4 – Richardson	Carrier Dome (21,409); Syracuse, NY
Feb 11, 2016; 7:00 pm, ESPN		Florida State	W 85–72	17–8 (7–5)	22 – Gbinije	10 – Lydon	5 – Richardson	Carrier Dome (22,056); Syracuse, NY
Feb 14, 2016; 1:00 pm, ACCN		at Boston College	W 75–61	18–8 (8–5)	20 – Lydon	6 – Roberson	5 – Richardson	Conte Forum (8,606); Chestnut Hill, MA
Feb 17, 2016; 7:00 pm, ESPN		at No. 18 Louisville	L 58–72	18–9 (8–6)	19 – Cooney	7 – Tied	6 – Howard	KFC Yum! Center (21,654); Louisville, KY
Feb 20, 2016; 2:00 pm, ESPN2		Pittsburgh	L 52–66	18–10 (8–7)	21 – Lydon	8 – Coleman	5 – Richardson	Carrier Dome (28,696); Syracuse, NY
Feb 27, 2016; 2:00 pm, ACCN		NC State	W 75–66	19–10 (9–7)	34 – Gbinije	7 – Coleman	7 – Richardson	Carrier Dome (27,141); Syracuse, NY
Feb 29, 2016; 7:00 pm, ESPN		at No. 8 North Carolina	L 70–75	19–11 (9–8)	17 – Gbinije	11 – Roberson	7 – Gbinije	Dean Smith Center (20,714); Chapel Hill, NC
Mar 5, 2016; 2:00 pm, ESPN2		at Florida State	L 73–78	19–12 (9–9)	21 – Gbinije	5 – Tied	5 – Gbinije	Donald L. Tucker Civic Center (7,769); Tallahassee, FL
ACC Tournament
Mar 9, 2016; 12:00 pm, ESPN/ACCN	(9)	vs. (8) Pittsburgh; Second round	L 71–72	19–13	24 – Gbinije	11 – Coleman	5 – Howard	Verizon Center (18,561); Washington, D.C.
NCAA tournament
Mar 18, 2016*; 12:15 pm, CBS	(10 MW)	vs. (7 MW) Dayton; First round	W 70–51	20–13	21 – Richardson	18 – Roberson	4 – Gbinije	Scottrade Center (14,250); St. Louis, MO
Mar 20, 2016*; 6:15 pm, TNT	(10 MW)	vs. (15 MW) Middle Tennessee; Second round	W 75–50	21–13	23 – Gbinije	9 – Roberson	4 – Cooney	Scottrade Center (15,169); St. Louis, MO
Mar 25, 2016*; 9:40 pm, CBS	(10 MW)	vs. (11 MW) Gonzaga; Sweet Sixteen	W 63–60	22–13	20 – Gbinije	12 – Roberson	3 – Gbinije, Howard	United Center (21,490); Chicago, IL
Mar 27, 2016*; 6:09 pm, TBS	(10 MW)	vs. (1 MW) No. 4 Virginia; Elite Eight	W 68–62	23–13	23 – Richardson	8 – Roberson	6 – Gbinije	United Center (20,155); Chicago, IL
Apr 2, 2016*; 8:49 pm, TBS	(10 MW)	vs. (1 E) No. 3 North Carolina; Final Four	L 66–83	23–14	22 – Cooney	9 – Roberson	2 – Gbinije	NRG Stadium (75,505); Houston, TX
*Non-conference game. ^{#}Rankings from AP Poll. (#) Tournament seedings in parentheses. MW=Midwest Region. All times are in Eastern Time.

== Rankings ==
Ranking movement Legend: ██ Increase in ranking. ██ Decrease in ranking. (RV) Received votes but unranked. (NR) Not ranked.
Poll	Pre	Wk 2	Wk 3	Wk 4	Wk 5	Wk 6	Wk 7	Wk 8	Wk 9	Wk 10	Wk 11	Wk 12	Wk 13	Wk 14	Wk 15	Wk 16	Wk 17	Wk 18	Wk 19	Final
AP	NR	NR	NR	14	RV	RV	NR	NR	NR	NR	NR	NR	NR	NR	RV	NR	NR	NR	NR	N/A
Coaches	NR	NR	NR	19	RV	RV	NR	NR	NR	NR	NR	NR	NR	NR	RV	NR	NR	NR	NR	10

== 2016–17 Recruiting ==
College recruiting information
Name	Hometown	School	Height	Weight	Commit date
Matthew Moyer; SF	Columbus, OH	South Kent School	6 ft 7.5 in (2.02 m)	202.5 lb (91.9 kg)	Aug 8, 2014
Matthew Moyer; SF	Recruit ratings: Scout: Rivals: (84)				
Tyus Battle; SG	Edison, NJ	St. Joseph High School	6 ft 5.5 in (1.97 m)	200 lb (91 kg)	Jul 13, 2015
Tyus Battle; SG	Recruit ratings: Scout: Rivals: (88)				
Overall recruit ranking:
Note: In many cases, Scout, Rivals, 247Sports, On3, and ESPN may conflict in their listings of height and weight.; In these cases, the average was taken. ESPN grades are on a 100-point scale.; Sources: "2016 Syracuse Signees". Rivals.; "2016 Syracuse Signees". Scout.; "2016 Syracuse Signees". ESPN.; "Scout.com Team Recruiting Rankings". Scout.; "2016 Team Ranking". Rivals.
