= 2013–14 Syracuse Orange men's basketball team =

American college basketball season

2013–14 Syracuse Orange men's basketball

Maui Invitational Champions

NCAA tournament, round of 32
- Conference: Atlantic Coast Conference

Ranking
- Coaches: No. 17
- AP: No. 14
- Record: 28–6 (14–4 ACC)
- Head coach: Jim Boeheim (38th season)
- Assistant coaches: Mike Hopkins; Adrian Autry; Gerry McNamara
- Home arena: Carrier Dome

2013–14 ACC men's basketball standings
	Conf.				Overall
Team	W		L	PCT	W		L	PCT
No. 3 Virginia †	16	–	2	.889	30	–	7	.811
No. 14 Syracuse	14	–	4	.778	28	–	6	.824
No. 8 Duke	13	–	5	.722	26	–	9	.743
No. 19 North Carolina	13	–	5	.722	24	–	10	.706
Pittsburgh	11	–	7	.611	26	–	10	.722
Clemson	10	–	8	.556	23	–	13	.639
NC State	9	–	9	.500	22	–	14	.611
Maryland	9	–	9	.500	17	–	15	.531
Florida State	9	–	9	.500	22	–	14	.611
Miami (FL)	7	–	11	.389	17	–	16	.515
Wake Forest	6	–	12	.333	17	–	16	.515
Georgia Tech	6	–	12	.333	16	–	17	.485
Notre Dame	6	–	12	.333	15	–	17	.469
Boston College	4	–	14	.222	8	–	24	.250
Virginia Tech	2	–	16	.111	9	–	22	.290
† 2014 ACC tournament winner Rankings from AP poll

The 2013–14 Syracuse Orange men's basketball team represented Syracuse University during the 2013–14 NCAA Division I men's basketball season. The team played its home games at the Carrier Dome in Syracuse, New York. This marked Syracuse's inaugural season in the Atlantic Coast Conference, having moved from the Big East Conference. They finished the season 28–6, 14–4 in ACC play to finish in second place. They lost in the quarterfinals of the ACC tournament to North Carolina State. They received an at-large bid to the NCAA tournament where they defeated Western Michigan in the second round before losing in the third round to Dayton. They started the season 25–0 before losing 6 of their final 9 games.

== Preseason ==
=== Roster changes ===
Syracuse lost two major contributors to graduation, combo guard Brandon Triche and small forward James Southerland. In addition, point guard Michael Carter-Williams left for the NBA.

Syracuse added five incoming freshmen including key contributor Tyler Ennis, and swingman Michael Gbinije became eligible after sitting out the 2012-13 season because of NCAA transfer rules.

=== Recruits ===
College recruiting information
Name	Hometown	School	Height	Weight	Commit date
Tyler Ennis; PG	Brampton, ON	St. Benedict's Preparatory School	6 ft 2 in (1.88 m)	180 lb (82 kg)	Aug 16, 2012
Tyler Ennis; PG	Recruit ratings: Scout: Rivals: (91)				
B.J. Johnson; SF	Ardmore, PA	Lower Merion High School	6 ft 6 in (1.98 m)	175 lb (79 kg)	Oct 16, 2012
B.J. Johnson; SF	Recruit ratings: Scout: Rivals: (84)				
Chinonso Obokoh; C	Rochester, NY	Bishop Kearney High School	6 ft 10 in (2.08 m)	220 lb (100 kg)	Oct 15, 2012
Chinonso Obokoh; C	Recruit ratings: Scout: Rivals: (77)				
Ron Patterson; SG	Indianapolis, IN	Brewster Academy	6 ft 3 in (1.91 m)	200 lb (91 kg)	Nov 3, 2012
Ron Patterson; SG	Recruit ratings: Scout: Rivals: (91)				
Tyler Roberson; PF	Union County, NJ	Roselle Catholic High School	6 ft 8 in (2.03 m)	210 lb (95 kg)	Nov 16, 2012
Tyler Roberson; PF	Recruit ratings: Scout: Rivals: (89)				
Overall recruit ranking: Scout: #6 Rivals: #11 ESPN: #6
Note: In many cases, Scout, Rivals, 247Sports, On3, and ESPN may conflict in their listings of height and weight.; In these cases, the average was taken. ESPN grades are on a 100-point scale.; Sources: "2013 Syracuse Signees". Rivals.; "2013 Syracuse Signees". Scout.; "2013 Syracuse Signees". ESPN.; "Scout.com Team Recruiting Rankings". Scout.; "2013 Team Ranking". Rivals.

=== Preseason outlook ===
At ACC Media Days, members of the media voted C.J. Fair the preseason Player of the Year. The media ranked SU the number two team in the conference behind Duke.

In its preseason rankings, The Sporting News ranked Syracuse eighth overall and second in the ACC behind Duke. TSN named C.J. Fair a third-team All-American.

Lindy’s Sports ranked Syracuse twelfth in its preseason ranking, third in the ACC behind Duke and North Carolina. Lindy's named C.J. Fair its pre-season Player of the Year for the ACC.

Blue Ribbon College Basketball Yearbook ranked Syracuse eighth in its preseason ranking, second in the ACC behind Duke.

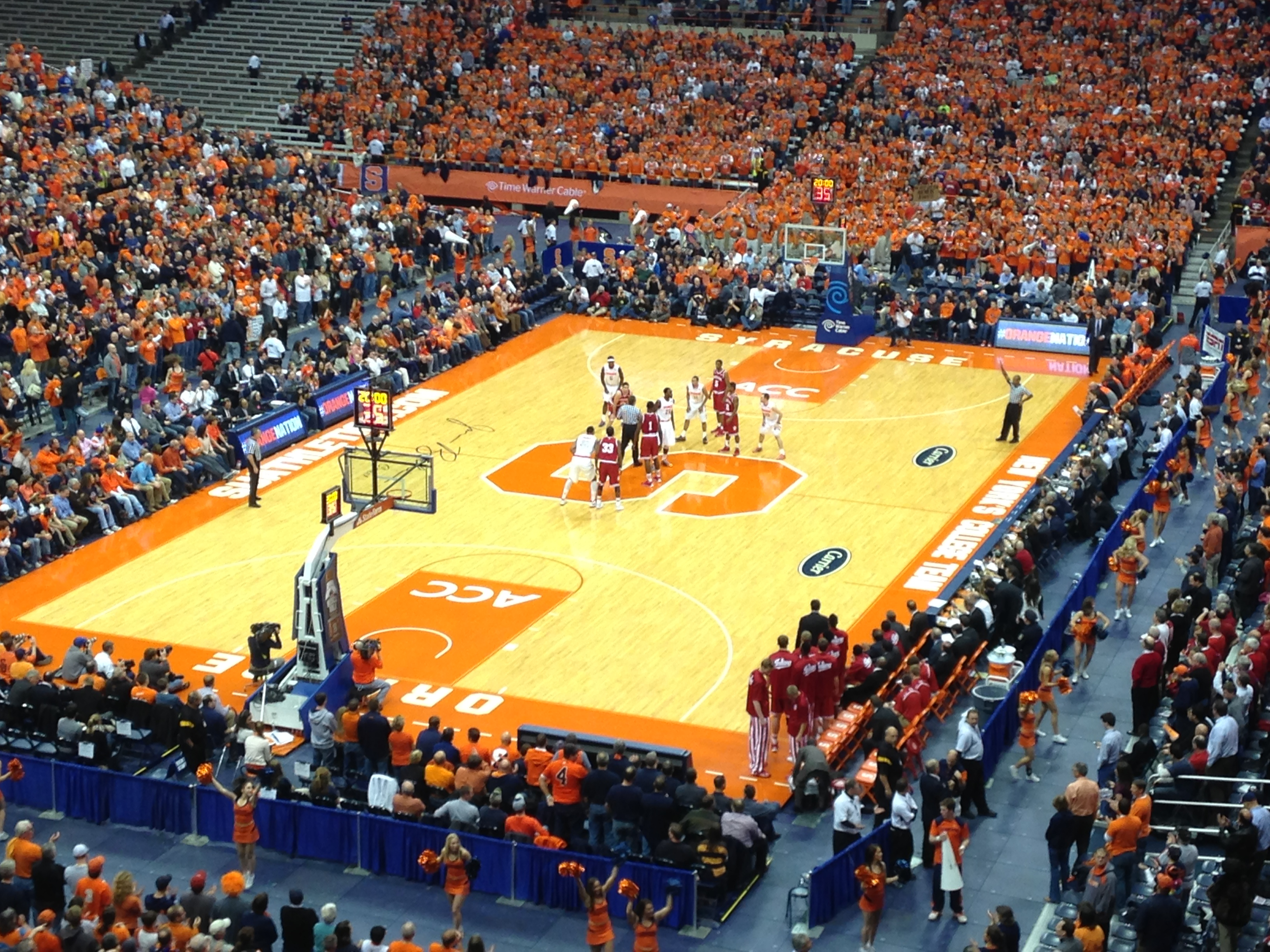
Syracuse and Indiana prepare for the opening tip on December 3, 2013. Rakeem Christmas, DaJuan Coleman, Trevor Cooney, Tyler Ennis and C.J. Fair started for the Orange.

== Roster ==
2013–14 Syracuse Orange men's basketball team
Players
Coaches

Pos.	#	Name	Height	Weight	Year	Previous school	Hometown
F	0	Michael Gbinije	6 ft 7 in (2.01 m)	200 lb (91 kg)	So	Benedictine College Prep	Richmond, Virginia
F	2	B. J. Johnson	6 ft 6 in (1.98 m)	175 lb (79 kg)	Fr	Lower Merion	Ardmore, Pennsylvania
F	3	Jerami Grant	6 ft 8 in (2.03 m)	203 lb (92 kg)	So	DeMatha Catholic	Hyattsville, Maryland
F	5	C. J. Fair	6 ft 8 in (2.03 m)	215 lb (98 kg)	Sr	Brewster Academy	Baltimore, Maryland
G	10	Trevor Cooney	6 ft 4 in (1.93 m)	195 lb (88 kg)	Jr	Sanford	Wilmington, Delaware
G	11	Tyler Ennis	6 ft 2 in (1.88 m)	180 lb (82 kg)	Fr	Saint Benedict's (NJ)	Brampton, Ontario
C	12	Baye Moussa Keita	6 ft 10 in (2.08 m)	215 lb (98 kg)	Sr	Oak Hill Academy	Saint Louis, Senegal
F	21	Tyler Roberson	6 ft 8 in (2.03 m)	210 lb (95 kg)	Fr	Roselle Catholic	Union, New Jersey
G	23	Russ DeRemer	6 ft 5 in (1.96 m)	203 lb (92 kg)	Sr	Xaverian Brothers	Wrentham, Massachusetts
F	25	Rakeem Christmas	6 ft 9 in (2.06 m)	242 lb (110 kg)	Jr	Academy of the New Church	Bryn Athyn, Pennsylvania
F	32	DaJuan Coleman (injured)	6 ft 9 in (2.06 m)	288 lb (131 kg)	So	Jamesville-DeWitt	Jamesville, New York
F	33	Albert Nassar	6 ft 6 in (1.98 m)	195 lb (88 kg)	Jr	South Fork	Stuart, Florida
G	34	Ron Patterson	6 ft 3 in (1.91 m)	200 lb (91 kg)	Fr	Brewster Academy	Indianapolis, Indiana
C	35	Chinoso Obokoh (redshirt)	6 ft 10 in (2.08 m)	220 lb (100 kg)	Fr	Bishop Kearney	Rochester, New York

Head coach

- Jim Boeheim, 38th yr. (Syracuse, 1966)

Assistant coach(es)

- Mike Hopkins, 18th yr. (Syracuse, 1993)
- Gerry McNamara, 5th yr. (Syracuse, 2007)
- Adrian Autry, 3rd yr. (Syracuse, 1994)

Legend

- (C) Team captain
- (S) Suspended
- (I) Ineligible
- (W) Walk-on
- Injured
- Current redshirt

Roster
Last update: 2014-1-21

=== Depth chart ===
Pos.	Starting 5	Bench 1	Bench 2
C	Rakeem Christmas	Baye Moussa Keita	Chinoso Obokoh
PF	Jerami Grant	Tyler Roberson	Albert Nassar
SF	C.J. Fair	B.J. Johnson	DaJuan Coleman
SG	Trevor Cooney	Ron Patterson	Nolan Hart
PG	Tyler Ennis	Michael Gbinije	Russ DeRemer

== Schedule ==
Date time, TV	Rank^{#}	Opponent^{#}	Result	Record	High points	High rebounds	High assists	Site (attendance) city, state
Exhibition
Aug 21*; 6:00 pm, TWCSC		at McGill University	W 80–40	–	17 – Grant	8 – Grant	3 – Ennis, Patterson	Love Competition Hall (848); Montreal, Quebec
Aug 22*; 7:00 pm, TWCSC		vs. Bishop's University	W 77–35	–	20 – Johnson	10 – Christmas	4 – Christmas, Ennis, Patterson	Champlain Gym (N/A); Saint-Lambert, Quebec
Aug 23*; 7:30 pm, TWCSC		vs. Carleton University	W 69–65 ^{OT}	–	18 – Grant	11 – Keita	4 – Ennis	Canadian Tire Centre (6,004); Ottawa, Ontario
Aug 24*; 7:00 pm, TWCSC		at University of Ottawa	W 73–50	–	26 – Coleman	11 – Christmas	2 – Cooney, Keita	Montpetit Hall (888); Ottawa, Ontario
Nov 1*; 7:00 ET, TWCSC		Holy Family University	W 79–41	–	13 – Fair, Grant	10 – Keita	5 – Fair	Carrier Dome (8,514); Syracuse, NY
Nov 5*; 7:00 ET, TWCSC		Ryerson University	W 81–46	–	18 – Fair	10 – Coleman	5 – Ennis	Carrier Dome (6,674); Syracuse, NY
Regular season
Nov 8*; 7:00 pm, ACC Network	No. 8	Cornell	W 82–60	1–0	27 – Cooney	8 – Ennis	6 – Ennis	Carrier Dome (24,788); Syracuse, NY
Nov 12*; 7:30 pm, ESPN3	No. 9	Fordham	W 89–74	2–0	26 – Fair	10 – Coleman, Grant	5 – Ennis	Carrier Dome (22,667); Syracuse, NY
Nov 16*; 4:30 pm, ACC Network	No. 9	Colgate	W 69–50	3–0	20 – Fair	7 – Christmas, Coleman, Fair	3 – Gbinije	Carrier Dome (25,518); Syracuse, NY
Nov 18*; 7:30 pm, ESPN3	No. 9	St. Francis Brooklyn; Maui Invitational Tournament	W 56–50	4–0	14 – Coleman	7 – Grant	3 – Ennis	Carrier Dome (23,117); Syracuse, NY
Nov 25*; 5:30 pm, ESPN2	No. 8	vs. Minnesota; Maui Invitational	W 75–67	5–0	16 – Fair	10 – Fair	5 – Ennis	Lahaina Civic Center (2,400); Maui, HI
Nov 26*; 7:00 pm, ESPN	No. 8	vs. California; Maui Invitational	W 92–81	6–0	28 – Ennis	8 – Grant	4 – Ennis	Lahaina Civic Center (2,400); Maui, HI
Nov 27*; 10:00 pm, ESPN	No. 8	vs. No. 18 Baylor; Maui Invitational	W 74–67	7–0	24 – Fair	5 – Christmas	9 – Ennis	Lahaina Civic Center (2,400); Maui, HI
Dec 3*; 7:15 pm, ESPN	No. 4	Indiana; ACC–Big Ten Challenge	W 69–52	8–0	21 – Cooney	7 – Ennis	8 – Ennis	Carrier Dome (26,414); Syracuse, NY
Dec 7*; 7:00 pm, ESPN3	No. 4	Binghamton	W 93–65	9–0	19 – Fair	10 – Coleman	5 – Gbinije, Grant	Carrier Dome (25,844); Syracuse, NY
Dec 15*; 12:00 pm, Fox Sports 1	No. 2	at St. John's	W 68–63	10–0	21 – Ennis, Fair	5 – Fair	6 – Ennis	Madison Square Garden (16,357); New York, NY
Dec 20*; 7:00 pm, ESPN3	No. 2	High Point	W 75–54	11–0	17 – Cooney	5 – Fair	9 – Ennis	Carrier Dome (19,473); Syracuse, NY
Dec 28*; 2:00 pm, CBS	No. 2	No. 8 Villanova	W 78–62	12–0	21 – Cooney	5 – Grant	2 – Cooney, Ennis, Fair, Keita	Carrier Dome (28,135); Syracuse, NY
Dec 31*; 3:00 pm, ESPNU	No. 2	Eastern Michigan	W 70–48	13–0	15 – Christmas, Grant	8 – Fair, Grant	9 – Ennis	Carrier Dome (20,306); Syracuse, NY
ACC regular season
Jan 4; 2:00 pm, ACC Network	No. 2	Miami (FL)	W 49–44	14–0 (1–0)	15 – Fair	7 – Christmas	7 – Ennis	Carrier Dome (21,839); Syracuse, NY
Jan 7; 9:00 pm, ACC Network	No. 2	at Virginia Tech	W 72–52	15–0 (2–0)	17 – Fair	10 – Grant	7 – Ennis	Cassell Coliseum (4,367); Blacksburg, VA
Jan 11; 12:00 pm, ESPN	No. 2	North Carolina	W 57–45	16–0 (3–0)	20 – Fair	12 – Grant	7 – Ennis	Carrier Dome (32,121); Syracuse, NY
Jan 13; 9:00 pm, ESPNU	No. 2	at Boston College	W 69–59	17–0 (4–0)	21 – Cooney	8 – Grant	5 – Ennis	Conte Forum (8,606); Chestnut Hill, MA
Jan 18; 4:00 pm, ESPN	No. 2	No. 22 Pittsburgh	W 59–54	18–0 (5–0)	16 – Ennis	6 – Fair	3 – Ennis, Grant	Carrier Dome (30,046); Syracuse, NY
Jan 25; 1:00 pm, CBS	No. 2	at Miami (FL)	W 64–52	19–0 (6–0)	16 – Grant	8 – Grant	4 – Ennis	BankUnited Center (7,122); Coral Gables, FL
Jan 29; 9:00 pm, ACC Network	No. 2	at Wake Forest	W 67–57	20–0 (7–0)	18 – Ennis	12 – Grant	4 – Ennis	Veterans Memorial Coliseum (12,523); Winston-Salem, NC
Feb 1; 6:30 pm, ESPN	No. 2	No. 17 Duke; College GameDay	W 91–89 ^{OT}	21–0 (8–0)	28 – Fair	12 – Grant	9 – Ennis	Carrier Dome (35,466); Syracuse, NY
Feb 3; 7:00 pm, ESPN	No. 1	Notre Dame; Big Monday	W 61–55	22–0 (9–0)	33 – Cooney	6 – Christmas	8 – Ennis	Carrier Dome (25,850); Syracuse, NY
Feb 9; 6:00 pm, ESPNU	No. 1	Clemson	W 57–44	23–0 (10–0)	19 – Fair	8 – Grant	5 – Ennis	Carrier Dome (25,931); Syracuse, NY
Feb 12; 7:00 pm, ESPN	No. 1	at No. 25 Pittsburgh	W 58–56	24–0 (11–0)	14 – Fair	5 – Christmas, Grant	5 – Ennis	Peterson Events Center (12,935); Pittsburgh, PA
Feb 15; 7:00 pm, ACC Network	No. 1	North Carolina State	W 56–55	25–0 (12–0)	14 – Christmas	14 – Grant	5 – Ennis	Carrier Dome (31,572); Syracuse, NY
Feb 19; 7:00 pm, ESPN2	No. 1	Boston College	L 59–62 ^{OT}	25–1 (12–1)	20 – Fair	11 – Christmas, Fair	6 – Ennis	Carrier Dome (26,716); Syracuse, NY
Feb 22; 7:00 pm, ESPN	No. 1	at No. 5 Duke	L 60–66	25–2 (12–2)	17 – Grant	9 – Keita	6 – Ennis	Cameron Indoor Stadium (9,314); Durham, NC
Feb 24; 7:00 pm, ESPN	No. 4	at Maryland; Big Monday	W 57–55	26–2 (13–2)	20 – Ennis	9 – Fair	3 – Ennis	Comcast Center (17,950); College Park, MD
Mar 1; 4:00 pm, ESPN	No. 4	at No. 12 Virginia	L 56–75	26–3 (13–3)	13 – Ennis, Fair	7 – Christmas	4 – Ennis	John Paul Jones Arena (14,593); Charlottesville, VA
Mar 4; 7:00 pm, ACC Network	No. 7	Georgia Tech	L 62–67	26–4 (13–4)	28 – Fair	10 – Christmas	7 – Ennis	Carrier Dome (26,766); Syracuse, NY
Mar 9; 2:00 pm, ACC Network	No. 7	at Florida State	W 74–58	27–4 (14–4)	22 – Fair	8 – Grant	4 – Ennis	Donald L. Tucker Center (10,435); Tallahassee, FL
ACC Tournament
Mar 14; 7:00 pm, ESPN2/ACC Network	No. 11	vs. North Carolina State; Quarterfinals	L 63–66	27–5	21 – Ennis	10 – Grant	7 – Ennis	Greensboro Coliseum (21,533); Greensboro, NC
NCAA tournament
Mar 20; 2:45 pm, CBS	No. 14 (3 S)	vs. No. (14 S) Western Michigan; Second round	W 77–53	28–5	18 – Cooney	11 – Fair	6 – Ennis	First Niagara Center (19,260); Buffalo, NY
Mar 22; 7:10 pm, CBS	No. 14 (3 S)	vs. (11 S) Dayton; Third round	L 53–55	28–6	19 – Ennis	10 – Fair	3 – Ennis	First Niagara Center (19,290); Buffalo, NY
*Non-conference game. ^{#}Rankings from AP Poll. (#) Tournament seedings in parentheses. All times are in Eastern Time. During NCAA Tournament (#) is seed within region S=South.

== Rankings ==
Ranking movement Legend: ██ Improvement in ranking. ██ Decrease in ranking. ██ Not ranked the previous week. RV=Others receiving votes.
Poll	Pre	Wk 2	Wk 3	Wk 4	Wk 5	Wk 6	Wk 7	Wk 8	Wk 9	Wk 10	Wk 11	Wk 12	Wk 13	Wk 14	Wk 15	Wk 16	Wk 17	Wk 18	Wk 19	Wk 20	Final
AP	8	9	9	8	4	2	2	2	2	2	2	2	2	1	1	1	4	7	11	14	N/A
Coaches	7	7	7	7	5	3	2	2	2	2	2	2	2	1	1	1	5	7	11	12	17

== 2014–15 Recruiting ==
College recruiting information
Name	Hometown	School	Height	Weight	Commit date
Chris McCullough; PF	Bronx, NY	Brewster Academy	6 ft 10 in (2.08 m)	220 lb (100 kg)	Nov 5, 2012
Chris McCullough; PF	Recruit ratings: Scout: Rivals: 247Sports: (92)				
Kaleb Joseph; PG	Nashua, NH	Cushing Academy	6 ft 3 in (1.91 m)	165 lb (75 kg)	Aug 17, 2013
Kaleb Joseph; PG	Recruit ratings: Scout: Rivals: 247Sports: (86)				
Overall recruit ranking: Scout: #14 Rivals: N/A ESPN: #7
Note: In many cases, Scout, Rivals, 247Sports, On3, and ESPN may conflict in their listings of height and weight.; In these cases, the average was taken. ESPN grades are on a 100-point scale.; Sources: "2014 Syracuse Signees". Rivals.; "2014 Syracuse Signees". Scout.; "2014 Syracuse Signees". ESPN.; "Scout.com Team Recruiting Rankings". Scout.; "2014 Team Ranking". Rivals.

== 2015–16 Recruiting ==
College recruiting information
Name	Hometown	School	Height	Weight	Commit date
Moustapha Diagne; C	Dakar, Senegal	Pope John XXIII High School	6 ft 9 in (2.06 m)	240 lb (110 kg)	May 31, 2014
Moustapha Diagne; C	Recruit ratings: Scout: Rivals: 247Sports: (87)				
Franklin Howard; SG	Fairfax, VA	Paul VI High School	6 ft 5 in (1.96 m)	185 lb (84 kg)	Apr 14, 2014
Franklin Howard; SG	Recruit ratings: Scout: Rivals: 247Sports: (85)				
Tyler Lydon; PF	Pine Plains, NY	Brewster Academy	6 ft 8 in (2.03 m)	181 lb (82 kg)	Oct 17, 2013
Tyler Lydon; PF	Recruit ratings: Scout: Rivals: 247Sports: (86)				
Malachi Richardson; SG	Hamilton, NJ	Trenton Catholic Academy	6 ft 5 in (1.96 m)	190 lb (86 kg)	Dec 13, 2013
Malachi Richardson; SG	Recruit ratings: Scout: Rivals: 247Sports: (94)				
Overall recruit ranking:
Note: In many cases, Scout, Rivals, 247Sports, On3, and ESPN may conflict in their listings of height and weight.; In these cases, the average was taken. ESPN grades are on a 100-point scale.; Sources: "2015 Syracuse Signees". Rivals.; "2015 Syracuse Signees". Scout.; "2015 Syracuse Signees". ESPN.; "Scout.com Team Recruiting Rankings". Scout.; "2015 Team Ranking". Rivals.

== 2016–17 Recruiting ==
College recruiting information
Name	Hometown	School	Height	Weight	Commit date
Matthew Moyer; PF	Columbus, OH	Lincoln High School	6 ft 8 in (2.03 m)	200 lb (91 kg)	Aug 8, 2014
Matthew Moyer; PF	Recruit ratings: Scout: Rivals: 247Sports: (N/A)				
Overall recruit ranking:
Note: In many cases, Scout, Rivals, 247Sports, On3, and ESPN may conflict in their listings of height and weight.; In these cases, the average was taken. ESPN grades are on a 100-point scale.; Sources: "2016 Syracuse Signees". Rivals.; "2016 Syracuse Signees". Scout.; "2016 Syracuse Signees". ESPN.; "Scout.com Team Recruiting Rankings". Scout.; "2016 Team Ranking". Rivals.
