= 2012–13 Syracuse Orange men's basketball team =

American college basketball season

2012–13 Syracuse Orange men's basketball

NCAA tournament, Final Four
- Conference: Big East Conference

Ranking
- Coaches: No. 3
- AP: No. 16
- Record: 30–10 (11–7 Big East)
- Head coach: Jim Boeheim (37th season)
- Assistant coaches: Mike Hopkins; Adrian Autry; Gerry McNamara
- Home arena: Carrier Dome

2012–13 Big East men's basketball standings
| | Conf. | | | | Overall |
| Team | W | | L | PCT | W | | L | PCT |
|---|---|---|---|---|---|---|---|---|
| No. 2 Louisville†** | 14 | – | 4 | .778 | 35 | – | 5 | .875 |
| No. 8 Georgetown | 14 | – | 4 | .778 | 25 | – | 7 | .781 |
| No. 15 Marquette | 14 | – | 4 | .778 | 26 | – | 9 | .743 |
| No. 20 Pittsburgh | 12 | – | 6 | .667 | 24 | – | 9 | .727 |
| No. 16 Syracuse | 11 | – | 7 | .611 | 30 | – | 10 | .750 |
| No. 23 Notre Dame | 11 | – | 7 | .611 | 25 | – | 10 | .714 |
| Villanova | 10 | – | 8 | .556 | 20 | – | 14 | .588 |
| Connecticut* | 10 | – | 8 | .556 | 20 | – | 10 | .667 |
| Cincinnati | 9 | – | 9 | .500 | 22 | – | 12 | .647 |
| Providence | 9 | – | 9 | .500 | 19 | – | 15 | .559 |
| St. John's | 8 | – | 10 | .444 | 17 | – | 16 | .515 |
| Rutgers | 5 | – | 13 | .278 | 15 | – | 16 | .484 |
| Seton Hall | 3 | – | 15 | .167 | 15 | – | 18 | .455 |
| South Florida | 3 | – | 15 | .167 | 12 | – | 19 | .387 |
| DePaul | 2 | – | 16 | .111 | 11 | – | 21 | .344 |
† 2013 Big East tournament winner As of March 30, 2013; Rankings from AP Poll; *Ineligible for postseason play due to APR penalties.

The 2012–13 Syracuse Orange men's basketball team represented Syracuse University in the 2012–13 NCAA Division I men's basketball season. The head coach, Jim Boeheim, served for his 37th year. The team played its home games at the Carrier Dome in Syracuse, New York and was a member of the Big East Conference. This team reached the Final Four for the fifth time in program history.

== Preseason outlook ==
Syracuse began the season ranked #9 in the Coaches' Poll and the AP poll, the second-highest ranking among Big East teams behind Louisville. In a poll of Big East coaches, Syracuse was predicted to finish second in the conference. In this same poll, the coaches named Brandon Triche to their all-Big East second team. C. J. Fair received an honorable mention.

A poll of writers in Big East cities predicted Syracuse would finish second in the conference. Triche, Fair and Michael Carter-Williams were named to the writers' all-Big East second team.

== Roster changes ==
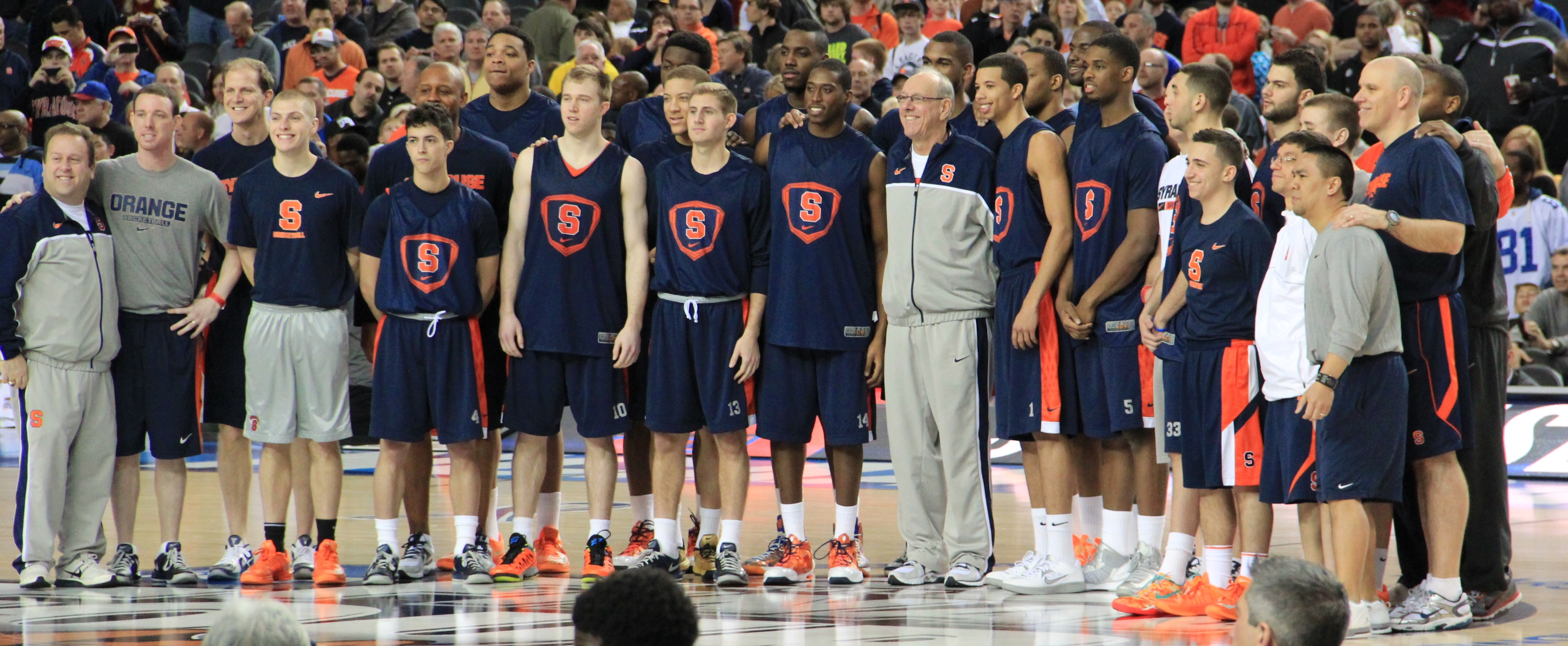
The 2012–2013 team at the Georgia Dome

Syracuse returned five players that had significant playing time last season (three players that earned starts and two that came off the bench), while losing four significant contributors.

Syracuse graduated two players that started every game during the previous season: senior point guard Scoop Jardine and senior forward Kris Joseph. Sophomore guard Dion Waiters, who averaged 24 minutes per game in the 2011–12 season, left school early to enter the NBA draft, as did sophomore center Fab Melo, who was a starter before the university ruled him academically ineligible toward the end of the season.

The starting line-up for the first half of the current season featured three players who started games in the previous season: senior guard Brandon Triche, junior forward C.J. Fair and sophomore forward Rakeem Christmas.

Sophomore guard Michael Carter-Williams, who did not start in the previous season, but played an average of 10 minutes per game, entered the starting line-up in the 2012–13 season, along with true freshman forward DaJuan Coleman.

Nine players have earned more than 10 minutes per game in the first half of the season. Senior James Southerland was averaging 26 minutes per game through 16 games before Syracuse University ruled him ineligible in January 2013. The three other players who have been playing off the bench for the team this season are redshirt freshman guard Trevor Cooney, freshman forward Jerami Grant and junior center Baye Moussa Keita. Keita also played off the bench last season.

By January of the 2012–13 season, more than halfway through, Syracuse was playing with just seven scholarship players due to Dajuan Coleman's knee injury and James Southerland's suspension. Coleman was Syracuse's starting center at the beginning of the season and Southerland led the team in three point scoring coming off the bench before his suspension. Head coach Boeheim said he thinks a rotation of seven or eight players is enough to compete.

=== Previous season's depth chart ===
| Pos. | Starting 5 | Bench |
|---|---|---|
| C | Rakeem Christmas | Baye Moussa Keita |
| PF | C.J. Fair |
| SF | Kris Joseph | James Southerland |
| SG | Brandon Triche | Dion Waiters |
| PG | Scoop Jardine | Michael Carter-Williams |

=== Current depth chart ===
| Pos. | Starting 5 | Bench |
|---|---|---|
| C | Rakeem Christmas | Baye Moussa Keita |
| PF | C.J. Fair | DaJuan Coleman |
| SF | James Southerland | Jerami Grant |
| SG | Brandon Triche | Trevor Cooney |
| PG | Michael Carter-Williams |

The three players on this year's team that consistently have earned the most playing time have been Triche, Fair and Carter-Williams. Cooney has been coming off the bench to spell the guards this season, while four back-line players (Coleman, Christmas, Keita and Grant) have been rounding out the line up. Total combined production from these four players has varied significantly.

=== New recruits on current team ===
College recruiting information
| Name | Hometown | School | Height | Weight | Commit date |
|---|---|---|---|---|---|
| DaJuan Coleman; C | DeWitt, NY | Jamesville-DeWitt High School | 6 ft 8 in (2.03 m) | 280 lb (130 kg) | Oct 25, 2011 |
| DaJuan Coleman; C | Recruit ratings: Scout: Rivals: (97) | | | | |
| Jerami Grant; PF | Hyattsville, MD | DeMatha Catholic High School | 6 ft 7 in (2.01 m) | 200 lb (91 kg) | Sep 16, 2011 |
| Jerami Grant; PF | Recruit ratings: Scout: Rivals: (96) | | | | |
Overall recruit ranking: Scout: #15 Rivals: #18 ESPN: #17
Note: In many cases, Scout, Rivals, 247Sports, On3, and ESPN may conflict in their listings of height and weight.; In these cases, the average was taken. ESPN grades are on a 100-point scale.; Sources: "2012 Syracuse Signees". Rivals.; "2012 Syracuse Signees". Scout.; "2012 Syracuse Signees". ESPN.; "Scout.com Team Recruiting Rankings". Scout.; "2012 Team Ranking". Rivals.

== Jim Boeheim milestones ==
Jim Boeheim became only the third coach to win 900 men's NCAA Division I games on December 17, 2012, when Syracuse defeated Detroit, 72–68. On December 31, 2012, Jim Boeheim won his 902nd game tying Bob Knight for second-most men's NCAA Division I victories with a 96–62 win over Central Connecticut. Boeheim passed Knight to gain sole possession of second place behind Mike Krzyzewski when Syracuse defeated Rutgers 78–53 on January 2, 2013.

== Roster ==
2012–13 Syracuse Orange men's basketball team
Players
Coaches

| Pos. | # | Name | Height | Weight | Year | Previous school | Hometown |
|---|---|---|---|---|---|---|---|
| F | 0 | Michael Gbinije | 6 ft 7 in (2.01 m) | 200 lb (91 kg) | RS So | Benedictine College Prep | Richmond, Virginia |
| G | 1 | Michael Carter-Williams | 6 ft 6 in (1.98 m) | 185 lb (84 kg) | So | St. Andrew's | Hamilton, Massachusetts |
| F | 3 | Jerami Grant | 6 ft 8 in (2.03 m) | 203 lb (92 kg) | Fr | DeMatha Catholic | Hyattsville, Maryland |
| G | 4 | Nolan Hart | 5 ft 10 in (1.78 m) | 152 lb (69 kg) | Jr | Albany Academy | Albany, New York |
| F | 5 | C. J. Fair | 6 ft 8 in (2.03 m) | 215 lb (98 kg) | Jr | Brewster Academy | Baltimore, Maryland |
| G | 10 | Trevor Cooney | 6 ft 4 in (1.93 m) | 195 lb (88 kg) | So | Sanford | Wilmington, Delaware |
| C | 12 | Baye Moussa Keita | 6 ft 10 in (2.08 m) | 215 lb (98 kg) | Jr | Oak Hill Academy | Saint Louis, Senegal |
| G | 13 | Griffin Hoffmann | 6 ft 1 in (1.85 m) | 178 lb (81 kg) | Sr | York Preparatory | New York, New York |
| F | 14 | Matt Lyde-Cajuste | 6 ft 5 in (1.96 m) | 215 lb (98 kg) | Sr | Iona Preparatory | Mt. Vernon, New York |
| G | 20 | Brandon Triche | 6 ft 4 in (1.93 m) | 210 lb (95 kg) | Sr | Jamesville-DeWitt | Jamesville, New York |
| F | 21 | Noel Jones | 6 ft 6 in (1.98 m) | 230 lb (104 kg) | Jr | Halifax Grammar School | Halifax, Nova Scotia |
| G | 23 | Russ DeRemer | 6 ft 5 in (1.96 m) | 203 lb (92 kg) | Jr | Xaverian Brothers | Wrentham, Massachusetts |
| F | 25 | Rakeem Christmas | 6 ft 9 in (2.06 m) | 242 lb (110 kg) | So | Academy of the New Church | Bryn Athyn, Pennsylvania |
| F | 30 | Josh Soley | 6 ft 4 in (1.93 m) | 225 lb (102 kg) | Fr | Freeport-ME | Freeport High School |
| F | 32 | DaJuan Coleman | 6 ft 9 in (2.06 m) | 288 lb (131 kg) | Fr | Jamesville-DeWitt | Jamesville, New York |
| F | 33 | Albert Nassar | 6 ft 6 in (1.98 m) | 195 lb (88 kg) | So | South Fork | Stuart, Florida |
| F | 43 | James Southerland | 6 ft 8 in (2.03 m) | 210 lb (95 kg) | Sr | Notre Dame Preparatory (MA) | Bayside, New York |

Head coach

- Jim Boeheim, 37th yr. (Syracuse, 1966)

Assistant coach(es)

- Mike Hopkins, 17th yr. (Syracuse, 1993)
- Gerry McNamara, 4th yr. (Syracuse, 2007)
- Adrian Autry, 2nd yr. (Syracuse, 1994)

Legend

- (C) Team captain
- (S) Suspended
- (I) Ineligible
- (W) Walk-on
- Injured
- Current redshirt

Roster
Last update: 2013-1-12

== Schedule ==
| Date time, TV | Rank^{#} | Opponent^{#} | Result | Record | High points | High rebounds | High assists | Site (attendance) city, state |
Exhibition
| Nov. 1*; 7:00 pm, TWCS | No. 9 | Pace (DII) | W 99–63 | – | 18 – Southerland | 9 – Christmas | 7 – Carter-Williams | Carrier Dome (7,145); Syracuse, NY |
| Nov. 4*; 4:00 pm, TWCS | No. 9 | Bloomsburg (DII) | W 103–60 | – | 23 – Triche | 6 – Carter-Williams, Grant | 8 – Carter-Williams | Carrier Dome (7,559); Syracuse, NY |
Regular Season
| Nov. 11*; 4:00 pm, FSN | No. 9 | vs. No. 20 San Diego State; Battle of the Midway | W 62–49 | 1–0 | 17 – Carter-Williams, Fair | 10 – Fair | 4 – Carter-Williams, Triche | USS Midway Museum (5,119); San Diego, CA |
| Nov. 18*; 1:00 pm, TWCS | No. 8 | Wagner | W 88–57 | 2–0 | 21 – Triche | 7 – Christmas, Coleman, Triche | 11 – Carter-Williams | Carrier Dome (17,273); Syracuse, NY |
| Nov. 21*; 7:00 pm, TWCS | No. 6 | Princeton | W 73–53 | 3–0 | 22 – Southerland | 6 – Carter-Williams, Coleman, Fair | 9 – Carter-Williams | Carrier Dome (17,881); Syracuse, NY |
| Nov. 25*; 1:00 pm, TWCS | No. 6 | Colgate | W 87–51 | 4–0 | 18 – Southerland | 9 – Christmas | 13 – Carter-Williams | Carrier Dome (21,085); Syracuse, NY |
| Nov. 30*; 8:30 pm, ESPN | No. 6 | at Arkansas; SEC/Big East Invitational | W 91–82 | 5–0 | 35 – Southerland | 10 – Carter-Williams | 9 – Carter-Williams | Bud Walton Arena (18,370); Fayetteville, AR |
| Dec. 3*; 7:00 pm, ESPNU | No. 4 | Eastern Michigan | W 84–48 | 6–0 | 14 – Coleman | 7 – Carter-Williams | 11 – Carter-Williams | Carrier Dome (20,822); Syracuse, NY |
| Dec. 6*; 8:00 pm, ESPN2 | No. 4 | Long Beach State | W 84–53 | 7–0 | 16 – Fair | 13 – Fair | 10 – Carter-Williams | Carrier Dome (20,876); Syracuse, NY |
| Dec. 8*; 7:00 pm, TWCS | No. 4 | Monmouth | W 108–56 | 8–0 | 18 – Triche | 14 – Coleman | 16 – Carter-Williams | Carrier Dome (21,760); Syracuse, NY |
| Dec. 15*; 7:00 pm, TWCS | No. 4 | Canisius; Gotham Classic | W 85–61 | 9–0 | 21 – Southerland | 6 – Coleman, Fair, Keita | 14 – Carter-Williams | Carrier Dome (18,120); Syracuse, NY |
| Dec. 17*; 7:00 pm, ESPN2 | No. 3 | Detroit; Gotham Classic | W 72–68 | 10–0 | 22 – Southerland | 8 – Christmas | 10 – Carter-Williams | Carrier Dome (17,902); Syracuse, NY |
| Dec. 22*; 12:00 pm, ESPN2 | No. 3 | vs. Temple; Gotham Classic | L 79–83 | 10–1 | 25 – Fair | 9 – Southerland | 6 – Carter-Williams | Madison Square Garden (12,648); New York, NY |
| Dec. 29*; 7:00 pm, TWCS | No. 9 | Alcorn State; Gotham Classic | W 57–36 | 11–1 | 13 – Fair | 7 – Christmas | 6 – Carter-Williams | Carrier Dome (19,365); Syracuse, NY |
| Dec. 31*; 3:00 pm, ESPNU | No. 7 | Central Connecticut | W 96–62 | 12–1 | 18 – Carter-Williams | 10 – Christmas, Fair | 13 – Carter-Williams | Carrier Dome (17,550); Syracuse, NY |
Big East Regular Season
| Jan. 2; 7:00 pm, Big East Network | No. 7 | Rutgers | W 78–53 | 13–1 (1–0) | 25 – Triche | 5 – Grant | 10 – Carter-Williams | Carrier Dome (17,413); Syracuse, NY |
| Jan. 6; 12:00 pm, Big East Network | No. 7 | at South Florida | W 55–44 | 14–1 (2–0) | 20 – Triche | 10 – Fair | 5 – Carter-Williams | USF Sun Dome (10,024); Tampa, FL |
| Jan. 9; 7:00 pm, Big East Network | No. 7 | at Providence | W 72–66 | 15–1 (3–0) | 23 – Fair | 11 – Fair | 6 – Carter-Williams | Dunkin' Donuts Center (11,121); Providence, RI |
| Jan. 12; 12:00 pm, Big East Network | No. 7 | Villanova | W 72–61 | 16–1 (4–0) | 22 – Fair | 5 – Christmas, Fair, Grant | 7 – Carter-Williams | Carrier Dome (27,586); Syracuse, NY |
| Jan. 19; 4:00 pm, ESPN | No. 6 | at No. 1 Louisville | W 70–68 | 17–1 (5–0) | 23 – Triche | 8 – Fair | 7 – Carter-Williams | KFC Yum! Center (22,814); Louisville, KY |
| Jan. 21; 3:30 pm, ESPN | No. 3 | No. 21 Cincinnati | W 57–55 | 18–1 (6–0) | 16 – Carter-Williams | 7 – Grant | 7 – Carter-Williams | Carrier Dome (24,281); Syracuse, NY |
| Jan. 26; 11:00 am, ESPNU | No. 3 | at Villanova | L 71–75 ^{OT} | 18–2 (6–1) | 23 – Triche | 10 – Christmas | 4 – Carter-Williams, Triche | Wells Fargo Center (18,273); Philadelphia, PA |
| Feb. 2; 12:00 pm, ESPN | No. 6 | at Pittsburgh | L 55–65 | 18–3 (6–2) | 20 – Fair | 5 – Grant | 2 – Carter-Williams, Cooney | Peterson Events Center (12,632); Pittsburgh, PA |
| Feb. 4; 7:00 pm, ESPN | No. 9 | No. 25 Notre Dame | W 63–47 | 19–3 (7–2) | 18 – Fair | 10 – Fair | 8 – Carter-Williams | Carrier Dome (23,982); Syracuse, NY |
| Feb. 10; 3:00 pm, ESPN | No. 9 | St. John's | W 77–58 | 20–3 (8–2) | 17 – Fair, Carter-Williams | 9 – Fair | 8 – Carter-Williams | Carrier Dome (27,169); Syracuse, NY |
| Feb. 13; 7:00 pm, ESPN | No. 6 | at Connecticut; Rivalry | L 58–66 | 20–4 (8–3) | 15 – Carter-Williams | 9 – Grant | 3 – Triche | XL Center (13,518); Hartford, CT |
| Feb. 16; 8:00 pm, TWCS/SNY/ESPN3 | No. 6 | at Seton Hall | W 76–65 | 21–4 (9–3) | 29 – Triche | 11 – Fair | 5 – Triche | Prudential Center (13,569); Newark, NJ |
| Feb. 20; 7:00 pm, ESPN2 | No. 8 | Providence | W 84–59 | 22–4 (10–3) | 20 – Fair, Southerland | 10 – Fair | 12 – Carter-Williams | Carrier Dome (23,717); Syracuse, NY |
| Feb. 23; 4:00 pm, CBS | No. 8 | No. 11 Georgetown; Rivalry | L 46–57 | 22–5 (10–4) | 13 – Fair, Southerland | 8 – Christmas | 5 – Carter-Williams | Carrier Dome (35,012); Syracuse, NY |
| Feb. 25; 7:00 pm, ESPN | No. 12 | at No. 22 Marquette | L 71–74 | 22–6 (10–5) | 20 – Fair | 8 – Keita | 8 – Triche | BMO Harris Bradley Center (16,049); Milwaukee, WI |
| Mar. 2; 12:00 pm, CBS | No. 12 | No. 10 Louisville | L 53–58 | 22–7 (10–6) | 19 – Fair | 7 – Carter-Williams, Southerland | 6 – Carter-Williams | Carrier Dome (31,173); Syracuse, NY |
| Mar. 6; 6:00 pm, TWCS/SNY/ESPN3 | No. 17 | DePaul | W 78–57 | 23–7 (11–6) | 22 – Southerland | 10 – Southerland | 5 – Carter-Williams | Carrier Dome (23,380); Syracuse, NY |
| Mar. 9; 12:00 pm, ESPN | No. 17 | at No. 5 Georgetown; ESPN College GameDay / Rivalry | L 39–61 | 23–8 (11–7) | 17 – Carter-Williams | 6 – Southerland, Christmas | 2 – Carter-Williams | Verizon Center (20,972); Washington, DC |
Big East tournament
| Mar. 13; 2:00 pm, ESPN | (5) No. 19 | vs. (12) Seton Hall; Second round | W 75–63 | 24–8 | 20 – Southerland | 8 – Fair | 14 – Carter-Williams | Madison Square Garden (20,057); New York, NY |
| Mar. 14; 2:00 pm, ESPN | (5) No. 19 | vs. (4) No. 17 Pittsburgh; Quarterfinal | W 62–59 | 25–8 | 20 – Southerland | 7 – Fair | 7 – Carter-Williams | Madison Square Garden (20,057); New York, NY |
| Mar. 15; 7:00 pm, ESPN | (5) No. 19 | vs. (1) No. 5 Georgetown; Semifinal / Rivalry | W 58–55 ^{OT} | 26–8 | 13 – Southerland, Triche, Keita | 8 – Keita | 6 – Carter-Williams | Madison Square Garden (20,057); New York, NY |
| Mar. 16; 8:30 pm, ESPN | (5) No. 19 | vs. (2) No. 4 Louisville; Final | L 61–78 | 26–9 | 21 – Fair | 8 – Southerland | 9 – Carter-Williams | Madison Square Garden (20,057); New York, NY |
NCAA tournament
| Mar. 21; 10:41 pm, truTV | (4 E) No. 16 | vs. (13 E) Montana; First round | W 81–34 | 27–9 | 20 – Triche | 8 – Carter-Williams, Grant | 9 – Carter-Williams | HP Pavilion (17,997); San Jose, CA |
| Mar. 23; 9:40 pm, TBS | (4 E) No. 16 | vs. (12 E) California; Second round | W 66–60 | 28–9 | 18 – Fair | 9 – Southerland | 3 – Carter-Williams | HP Pavilion (18,030); San Jose, CA |
| March 28*; 9:52 pm, CBS | (4 E) No. 16 | vs. (1 E) No. 4 Indiana; Sweet Sixteen | W 61–50 | 29–9 | 24 – Carter-Williams | 9 – Fair | 2 – Triche | Verizon Center (19,731); Washington, DC |
| March 30*; 4:30 pm, CBS | (4 E) No. 16 | vs. (3 E) No. 15 Marquette; Elite Eight | W 55–39 | 30–9 | 16 – Southerland | 8 – Carter-Williams | 6 – Carter-Williams | Verizon Center (19,801); Washington, DC |
| April 6*; 9:21 pm, CBS | (4 E) No. 16 | vs. (4 S) No. 10 Michigan; Final Four | L 56–61 | 30–10 | 22 – Fair | 7 – Grant | 8 – Triche | Georgia Dome (75,350); Atlanta, GA |
*Non-conference game. ^{#}Rankings from AP Poll. (#) Tournament seedings in parentheses. All times are in Eastern Time. (#) during NCAA Tournament is Seed with Region E=East S=South.

== 2013 NCAA Tournament comparisons ==
| Comparison | Syracuse | Michigan |
|---|---|---|
| Leading scorer in last five games | Fair (15.2 ppg) | Burke (16.2 ppg) |
| Record | 30–9 | 30–7 |
| Points per game | 70.8 | 75.5 |
| Opponent points per game | 58.6 | 62.9 |
| Net points per game | 12.2 | 12.6 |
| FGM/FGA | 984–2,238 | 1,047–2,159 |
| FG % | 44% | 49% |
| 3 pt. FGM/FGA | 230–683 | 280–727 |
| 3 pt. FG % | 34% | 39% |
| Average height of starting five | 6'7" | 6'6" |
| Average weight of starting five | 213 | 209 |
| Starting five class years | Sr. (2), Jr. (1), So. (2) | Jr. (1), So. (1), Fr. (3) |
| Point guard (points per game) | 12.1 (Carter-Williams) | 18.8 (Burke) |
| Point guard (assists per game) | 7.4 | 6.8 |
| Point guard (turnovers per game) | 3.4 | 2.2 |
| Point guard (net assists-turnovers) | 3.9 | 4.6 |
| Guard (points per game) | 14.3 (Triche) | 11.5 (Stauskas) |
| Forwards (points per game) | 25.8 (Fair, Southerland) | 25.2 (Hardaway, Robinson) |
| Forwards (rebounds per game) | 11.4 | 10.0 |
| Center (points per game) | 5.1 (Christmas) | 7.4 (McGary) |
| Center (rebounds per game) | 4.6 | 6.2 |
| RPI ranking (pre-NCAA tournament) | 7 | 12 |
| BPI ranking (pre-NCAA tournament) | 11 | 8 |

== Rankings ==
Ranking movement Legend: ██ Improvement in ranking. ██ Decrease in ranking. ██ Not ranked the previous week. RV=Others receiving votes.
| Poll | Pre | Wk 1 | Wk 2 | Wk 3 | Wk 4 | Wk 5 | Wk 6 | Wk 7 | Wk 8 | Wk 9 | Wk 10 | Wk 11 | Wk 12 | Wk 13 | Wk 14 | Wk 15 | Wk 16 | Wk 17 | Wk 18 | Final |
|---|---|---|---|---|---|---|---|---|---|---|---|---|---|---|---|---|---|---|---|---|
| AP | 9 | 8 | 6 | 6 | 4 | 4 | 3 | 9 | 7 | 7 | 6 | 3 | 6 | 9 | 6 | 8 | 12 | 17 | 19 | 16 |
| Coaches | 9 | 8 | 6 | 5 | 4 | 4 | 3 | 7 | 7 | 7 | 6 | 4 | 6 | 9 | 7 | 8 | 12 | 16 | 20 | 18 |

== 2013–14 Recruiting ==
College recruiting information
| Name | Hometown | School | Height | Weight | Commit date |
|---|---|---|---|---|---|
| Tyler Ennis; PG | Newark, NJ | St. Benedict's High School | 6 ft 2 in (1.88 m) | 180 lb (82 kg) | Aug 16, 2012 |
| Tyler Ennis; PG | Recruit ratings: Scout: Rivals: (87) | | | | |
| B.J. Johnson; SF | Ardmore, PA | Lower Merion High School | 6 ft 6 in (1.98 m) | 175 lb (79 kg) | Oct 16, 2012 |
| B.J. Johnson; SF | Recruit ratings: Scout: Rivals: (78) | | | | |
| Chinonso Obokoh; C | Rochester, NY | Bishop Kearney High School | 6 ft 10 in (2.08 m) | 220 lb (100 kg) | Oct 15, 2012 |
| Chinonso Obokoh; C | Recruit ratings: Scout: Rivals: (78) | | | | |
| Ron Patterson; SG | Indianapolis, IN | Brewster Academy | 6 ft 3 in (1.91 m) | 200 lb (91 kg) | Nov 3, 2012 |
| Ron Patterson; SG | Recruit ratings: Scout: Rivals: (91) | | | | |
| Tyler Roberson; PF | Union, NJ | Roselle Catholic High School | 6 ft 8 in (2.03 m) | 210 lb (95 kg) | Nov 16, 2012 |
| Tyler Roberson; PF | Recruit ratings: Scout: Rivals: (89) | | | | |
Overall recruit ranking: Scout: #12 Rivals: #9 ESPN: #7
Note: In many cases, Scout, Rivals, 247Sports, On3, and ESPN may conflict in their listings of height and weight.; In these cases, the average was taken. ESPN grades are on a 100-point scale.; Sources: "2013 Syracuse Signees". Rivals.; "2013 Syracuse Signees". Scout.; "2013 Syracuse Signees". ESPN.; "Scout.com Team Recruiting Rankings". Scout.; "2013 Team Ranking". Rivals.

== 2014–15 Recruiting ==
College recruiting information
| Name | Hometown | School | Height | Weight | Commit date |
|---|---|---|---|---|---|
| Chris McCullough; PF | Bronx, NY | Brewster Academy | 6 ft 10 in (2.08 m) | 220 lb (100 kg) | Nov 5, 2012 |
| Chris McCullough; PF | Recruit ratings: Scout: Rivals: (91) | | | | |
Overall recruit ranking:
Note: In many cases, Scout, Rivals, 247Sports, On3, and ESPN may conflict in their listings of height and weight.; In these cases, the average was taken. ESPN grades are on a 100-point scale.; Sources: "2014 Syracuse Signees". Rivals.; "2014 Syracuse Signees". Scout.; "2014 Syracuse Signees". ESPN.; "Scout.com Team Recruiting Rankings". Scout.; "2014 Team Ranking". Rivals.
