= DaJuan Coleman =

American basketball player (born 1992)

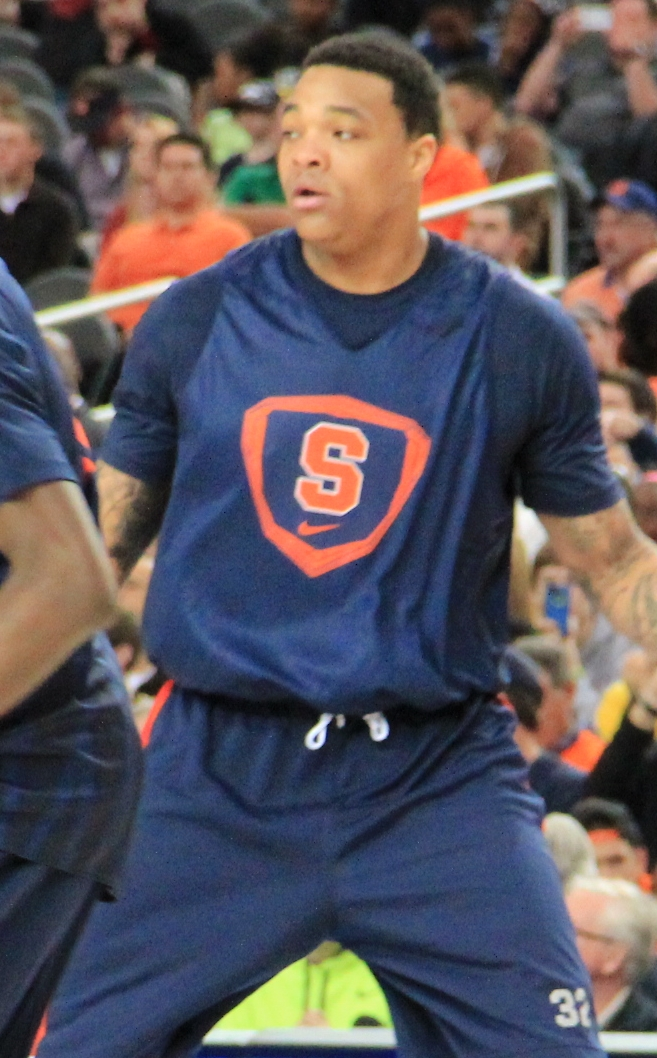
- Coleman in 2013

KK Zlatorog Laško
- Position: Center
- League: Slovenian League 1

Personal information
- Born: October 16, 1992 (age 34) Syracuse, New York
- Listed height: 6 ft 9 in (2.06 m)
- Listed weight: 258 lb (117 kg)

Career information
- High school: Jamesville-DeWitt (DeWitt, New York)
- College: Syracuse (2012–2017)
- NBA draft: 2017: undrafted
- Playing career: 2019–present

Career history
- 2019–present: KK Zlatorog Laško

Career highlights
- McDonald's All-American (2012); Mr. New York Basketball (2012)

DaJuan Coleman (born October 16, 1992) is an American professional basketball player for KK Zlatorog Laško of the Slovenian League 1. He played college basketball for the Syracuse Orange.

== High school career ==
Coleman began his high school varsity career at Jamesville-Dewitt as a freshman. His senior year in high school he was the recipient of the 2012 Mr. New York Basketball Award. Former Syracuse basketball players that won that award include Brandon Triche, Jonny Flynn and John Wallace. Coleman was on the same high school team as Triche in the '08–'09 season (Coleman's freshman year, Triche's senior year). Coleman was the number seven recruit in the nation.

== College career ==
Coleman started the first game of his college career, a 62–49 victory over San Diego State.

Syracuse announced Coleman would have surgery on his left knee at the end of January 2013 and would be out for at least four weeks. Syracuse later announced that Coleman would miss the remainder of the 2013–14 season due to the injury.

== Professional career ==
On July 21, 2019, Coleman signed his first professional contract with KK Zlatorog Laško of the Slovenian League 1, joining former Syracuse teammate, Kaleb Joseph.

== Statistics ==
=== College statistics ===
Year	GP-GS	MPG	PPG	FG%	RPG	APG	TPG	SPG	BPG
2012–13	24–20	12.7	4.8	44%	4.0	0.2	1.0	0.5	0.4
2013–14	13–12	13.0	4.3	58%	4.2	0.8	1.2	0.3	0.5
2015–16*	24–24	16.8	5.0	54%	4.4	0.5	1.3	0.6	0.8

Did not play during 2014–15 season (injury)

- 2015–16 statistics as of 2/12/16

=== College career highs ===
Points: 14 against Eastern Michigan (12/3/12)

Rebounds: 14 against Monmouth (12/8/12)
