= Jerami Grant =

American basketball player (born 1994)

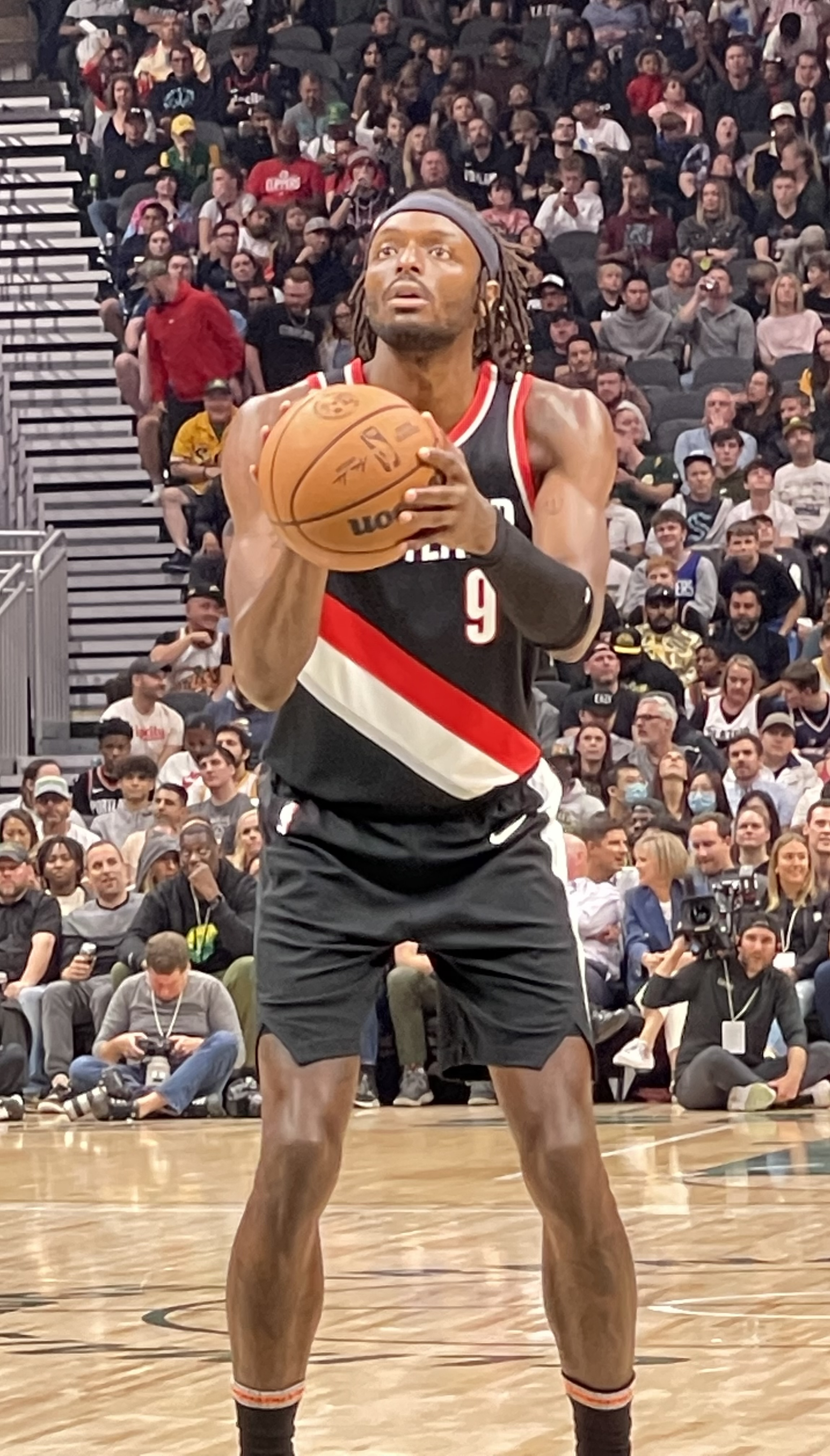
- Grant with the Portland Trail Blazers in 2022

No. 3 – Memphis Grizzlies
- Position: Power forward / small forward
- League: NBA

Personal information
- Born: March 12, 1994 (age 32) Portland, Oregon, U.S.
- Listed height: 6 ft 7 in (2.01 m)
- Listed weight: 213 lb (97 kg)

Career information
- High school: DeMatha Catholic (Hyattsville, Maryland)
- College: Syracuse (2012–2014)
- NBA draft: 2014: 2nd round, 39th overall pick
- Drafted by: Philadelphia 76ers
- Playing career: 2014–present

Career history
- 2014–2016: Philadelphia 76ers
- 2016–2019: Oklahoma City Thunder
- 2019–2020: Denver Nuggets
- 2020–2022: Detroit Pistons
- 2022–2026: Portland Trail Blazers
- 2026–present: Memphis Grizzlies
- Stats at NBA.com
- Stats at Basketball Reference
Medals
Men's basketball
Representing the United States
Olympic Games
Gold medal – first place	2020 Tokyo	Team
FIBA Americas U18 Championship
Gold medal – first place	2012 Brazil

Houston Jerami Grant (/ˈdʒɛrəmi/ JERR-ə-mee; born March 12, 1994) is an American professional basketball player for the Memphis Grizzlies of the National Basketball Association (NBA). He played college basketball for the Syracuse Orange and was drafted by the Philadelphia 76ers in the second round of the 2014 NBA draft. Grant has also played for the Oklahoma City Thunder, Denver Nuggets, Detroit Pistons and Portland Trail Blazers. He won a gold medal with the 2020 U.S. Olympic team.

== High school career ==
Grant attended DeMatha Catholic High School in Hyattsville, Maryland, where as a senior in 2011–12, he averaged 12.5 points in 23 games.

Considered a four-star recruit by ESPN.com, Grant was listed as the No. 11 power forward and the No. 37 player in the nation in 2012.

== College career ==
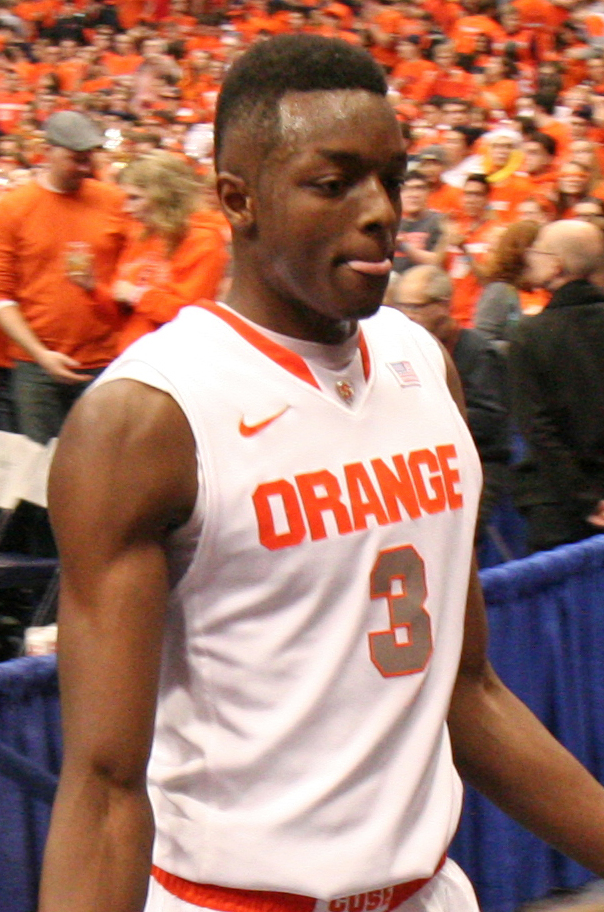
Grant at Syracuse in 2014

At Syracuse, Grant averaged 12.1 points, 6.8 rebounds and 1.4 assists in 31.4 minutes per game in 2013–14 while shooting 49.6% from the floor; he also scored in double figures in 24 of 32 games played and posted 19 points three times. Further, he was a 2014 All-ACC Honorable Mention selection.

In April 2014, Grant declared for the NBA draft, forgoing his final two years of college eligibility. He started off as a guard, then moved to the small forward position.

== Professional career ==
=== Philadelphia 76ers (2014–2016) ===
On June 26, 2014, Grant was selected in the second round of that year's NBA draft with the 39th overall pick by the Philadelphia 76ers, and he joined the team for the 2014 NBA Summer League. On September 29, 2014, he signed a four-year deal with the franchise, with two of them being guaranteed. On January 21, 2015, he came away with eight blocks in a loss to the New York Knicks; this was the most blocks in a game for a 76er since Samuel Dalembert had nine on December 12, 2007, as well as the most by a 76er rookie since Shawn Bradley had nine on January 17, 1994. On February 2, he had a season-best game with 18 points and 7 rebounds in a loss to the Cleveland Cavaliers.

In July 2015, Grant re-joined the 76ers for the 2015 NBA Summer League. On November 11, 2015, he recorded his first career double-double with 12 points and 10 rebounds, coming in a loss to the Toronto Raptors. On December 30, he posted a then career-high 11 rebounds to go along with 16 points and five blocks in a 110–105 win over the Sacramento Kings.

=== Oklahoma City Thunder (2016–2019) ===
On November 1, 2016, Grant was traded to the Oklahoma City Thunder in exchange for Ersan İlyasova and a protected draft pick. He made his debut for the Thunder the following day in an 85–83 win over the Los Angeles Clippers, recording six points, two rebounds, and two blocks in 18 minutes off the bench. On December 19, 2016, he scored a season-high 15 points in a 110–108 loss to the Atlanta Hawks. On February 1, 2017, he tied his season high mark with 15 points in a 128–100 loss to the Chicago Bulls.

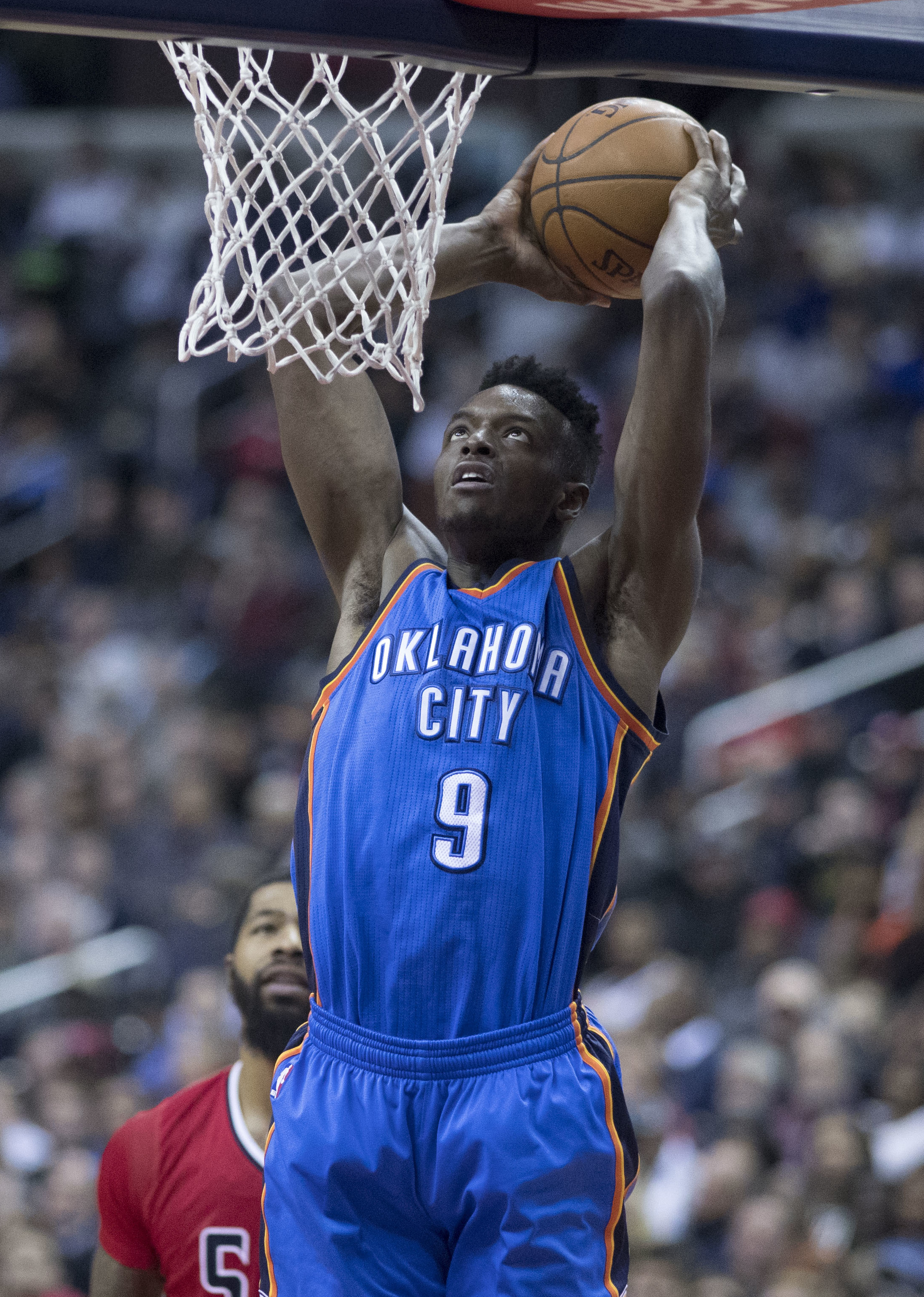
Jerami Grant with the Oklahoma City Thunder in 2017

On October 31, 2017, Grant scored 17 points off the bench in a 110–91 win over the Milwaukee Bucks. He finished 5-of-9 from the floor to record 17 points for the first time since April 1, 2016.

On July 7, 2018, Grant re-signed with the Thunder on a three-year, $27 million contract. On January 10, 2019, he scored a then career-high 25 points to go with 12 rebounds in a 154–147 double-overtime loss to the San Antonio Spurs. On March 18, he scored 27 points in a 116–107 loss to the Miami Heat. On April 10, he set a then career high with 28 points in a 127–116 win over the Bucks.

=== Denver Nuggets (2019–2020) ===
On July 8, 2019, Grant was traded to the Denver Nuggets for a 2020 first-round pick.

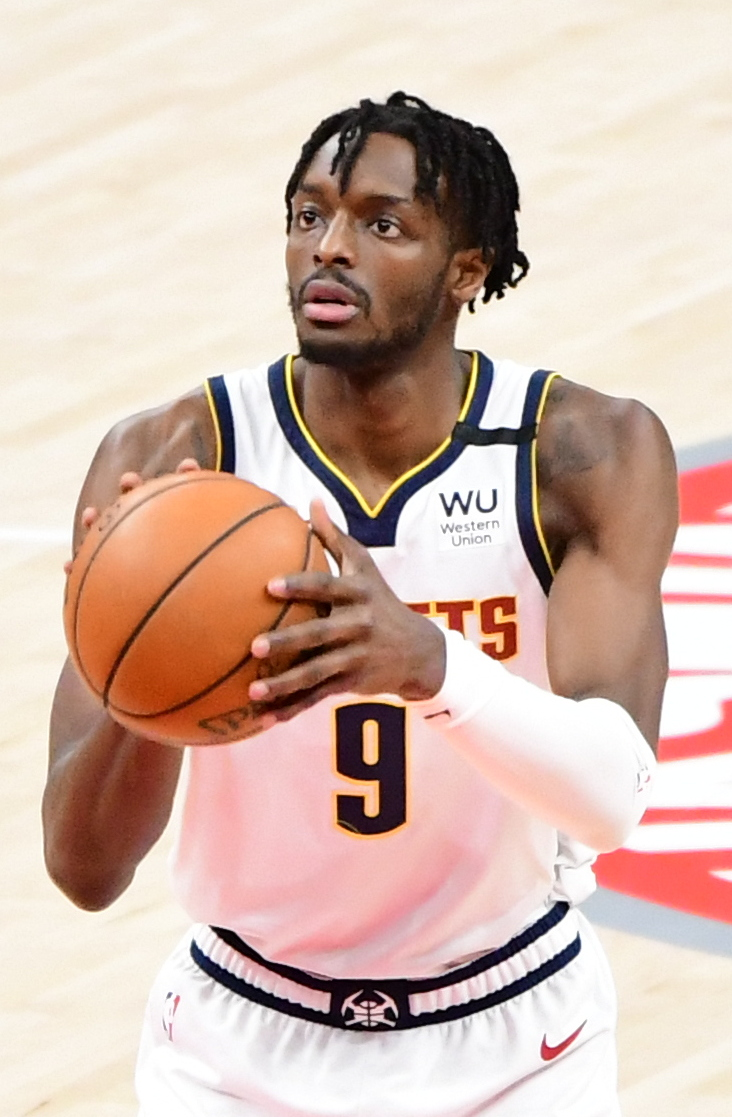
Jerami Grant with the Denver Nuggets in 2020

On February 25, 2020, Grant scored a then career-high 29 points in a 115–98 win over the Detroit Pistons. On September 15, 2020, in a Game 7 win against the favored Clippers, Grant outscored Paul George 14 to 10 while playing 9 fewer minutes. However, he struggled against LeBron James and Anthony Davis in the Western Conference Finals, as the Nuggets fell to the Los Angeles Lakers in five games. Grant scored 26 points in the Nuggets' Game 3 victory. Grant averaged 11.6 points and 3.3 rebounds in the playoffs.

=== Detroit Pistons (2020–2022) ===
On November 22, 2020, Grant signed a three-year, $60 million contract with the Detroit Pistons through a sign-and-trade with the Denver Nuggets. Detroit also received draft rights to 2015 second-round pick Nikola Radičević in exchange for cash considerations. On February 17, 2021, Grant scored a then career-high 43 points in a 105–102 loss to the Chicago Bulls. Grant ended the season as a Most Improved Player award finalist, finishing second behind Julius Randle, while averaging a career high in points per game.

On December 10, 2021, in a 93–109 loss to the New Orleans Pelicans, Grant suffered a right thumb injury. On December 16, he underwent surgery to repair the ulnar collateral ligament (UCL) in his right thumb and was ruled out for at least six weeks. On March 28, 2022, Grant was ruled out for the remainder of the season with a calf strain.

=== Portland Trail Blazers (2022–2026) ===
On July 6, 2022, Grant was traded to the Portland Trail Blazers, along with the draft rights to Ismaël Kamagate, in exchange for a top-four protected 2025 first-round pick (via Milwaukee), the draft rights to Gabriele Procida, and two future second-round picks. On October 23, Grant put up 16 points, along with a game-winning layup in a 106–104 win over the Los Angeles Lakers. On November 4, Grant scored 30 points and hit a game-winning jumper in a 108–106 win over the Phoenix Suns. On November 25, Grant scored a then career-high 44 points in a 132–129 overtime win over the New York Knicks. He made 63 starts for Portland in the 2022–23 season, averaging 20.5 points, 4.5 rebounds, and 2.4 assists.

On July 9, 2023, Grant re-signed with the Blazers on a five-year, $160 million contract. On February 8, 2024, Grant scored a career-high 49 points in a 128–122 loss to the Detroit Pistons. He made 54 starts for the Trail Blazers during the 2023–24 NBA season, recording averages of 21.0 pints, 3.5 rebounds, and 2.8 rebounds.

Grant logged 47 starts for Portland in the 2024–25 season, averaging 14.4 points, 3.5 rebounds, and 2.1 assists. He made 57 appearances (including 38 starts) for the Trail Blazers during the 2025–26 season, averaging 18.6 points, 3.5 rebounds, and 2.1 assists.

=== Memphis Grizzlies (2026–present) ===
On June 29, 2026, Grant was traded to the Memphis Grizzlies, along with forward Kris Murray, in exchange for former All-Star Ja Morant. On October 21, Grant made his Grizzlies debut, recording 15 points and three assists in a 123–103 win over the Utah Jazz.

== National team career ==
On June 28, 2021, Grant played as a member of the 2020 U.S. Olympic team that won a gold medal in Tokyo.

== Career statistics ==
Legend
GP	Games played	GS	Games started	MPG	Minutes per game
FG%	Field goal percentage	3P%	3-point field goal percentage	FT%	Free throw percentage
RPG	Rebounds per game	APG	Assists per game	SPG	Steals per game
BPG	Blocks per game	PPG	Points per game	**Bold**	Career high

=== NBA ===
==== Regular season ====
Year	Team	GP	GS	MPG	FG%	3P%	FT%	RPG	APG	SPG	BPG	PPG
2014–15	Philadelphia	65	11	21.2	.352	.228	.591	3.0	1.2	.6	1.0	6.3
2015–16	Philadelphia	77	52	26.8	.419	.240	.658	4.7	1.8	.7	1.6	9.7
2016–17	Philadelphia	2	0	20.6	.353	.000	.500	3.5	.0	.0	**2.0**	8.0
2016–17	Oklahoma City	78	4	19.1	.469	.377	.619	2.6	.6	.4	1.0	5.4
2017–18	Oklahoma City	**81**	1	20.3	**.535**	.291	.675	3.9	.7	.4	1.0	8.4
2018–19	Oklahoma City	80	**77**	32.7	.497	.392	.710	**5.2**	1.0	.8	1.3	13.6
2019–20	Denver	71	24	26.6	.478	.389	.750	3.5	1.2	.7	.8	12.0
2020–21	Detroit	54	54	33.9	.429	.350	.845	4.6	**2.8**	.6	1.1	**22.3**
2021–22	Detroit	47	47	31.9	.426	.358	.838	4.1	2.4	**.9**	1.0	19.2
2022–23	Portland	63	63	**35.6**	.475	.401	.813	4.5	2.4	.8	.8	20.5
2023–24	Portland	54	54	33.9	.451	**.402**	.817	3.5	**2.8**	.8	.6	21.0
2024–25	Portland	47	47	32.4	.373	.365	**.849**	3.5	2.1	**.9**	1.0	14.4
2025–26	Portland	57	38	29.7	.453	.389	.814	3.5	2.1	.7	.6	18.6
Career		776	472	28.0	.449	.367	.759	3.9	1.6	.7	1.0	13.5

==== Playoffs ====
Year	Team	GP	GS	MPG	FG%	3P%	FT%	RPG	APG	SPG	BPG	PPG
2017	Oklahoma City	5	0	22.2	**.613**	.333	.857	3.8	.8	.2	.4	9.2
2018	Oklahoma City	6	0	22.2	.514	.250	.455	3.3	1.0	.7	.5	7.2
2019	Oklahoma City	5	5	**35.2**	.500	**.450**	.692	**5.6**	.8	.6	**2.0**	**11.6**
2020	Denver	**19**	**16**	34.4	.406	.326	.889	3.3	**1.3**	.6	.8	**11.6**
2026	Portland	5	0	22.4	.349	.333	**.944**	1.8	.4	**1.0**	.2	10.4
Career		40	21	30.7	.441	.340	.825	3.5	1.0	.6	.8	10.5

=== College ===
Year	Team	GP	GS	MPG	FG%	3P%	FT%	RPG	APG	SPG	BPG	PPG
2012–13	Syracuse	**40**	9	14.3	.462	**.400**	.562	3.0	.5	.4	.5	3.9
2013–14	Syracuse	32	**20**	**31.4**	**.496**	.000	**.674**	**6.8**	**1.4**	**.8**	**.6**	**12.1**
Career		72	29	21.9	.486	.300	.641	4.7	.9	.6	.5	7.5

== Personal life ==
Grant is the son of Beverly and Harvey Grant (a former NBA player), and has three brothers: Jerai, Jerian, and Jaelin. Grant's uncle, Horace (twin brother of Harvey), played college basketball at Clemson and was a four-time NBA champion with the Chicago Bulls and Los Angeles Lakers. Two of his brothers, Jerai and Jerian, are also professional basketball players. Jerian plays for Panathinaikos of the Greek Basketball League (GBL) and the EuroLeague. In May 2024, Grant became a minority owner of his hometown MLS team D.C. United.
