= James Southerland =

American basketball player (born 1990)

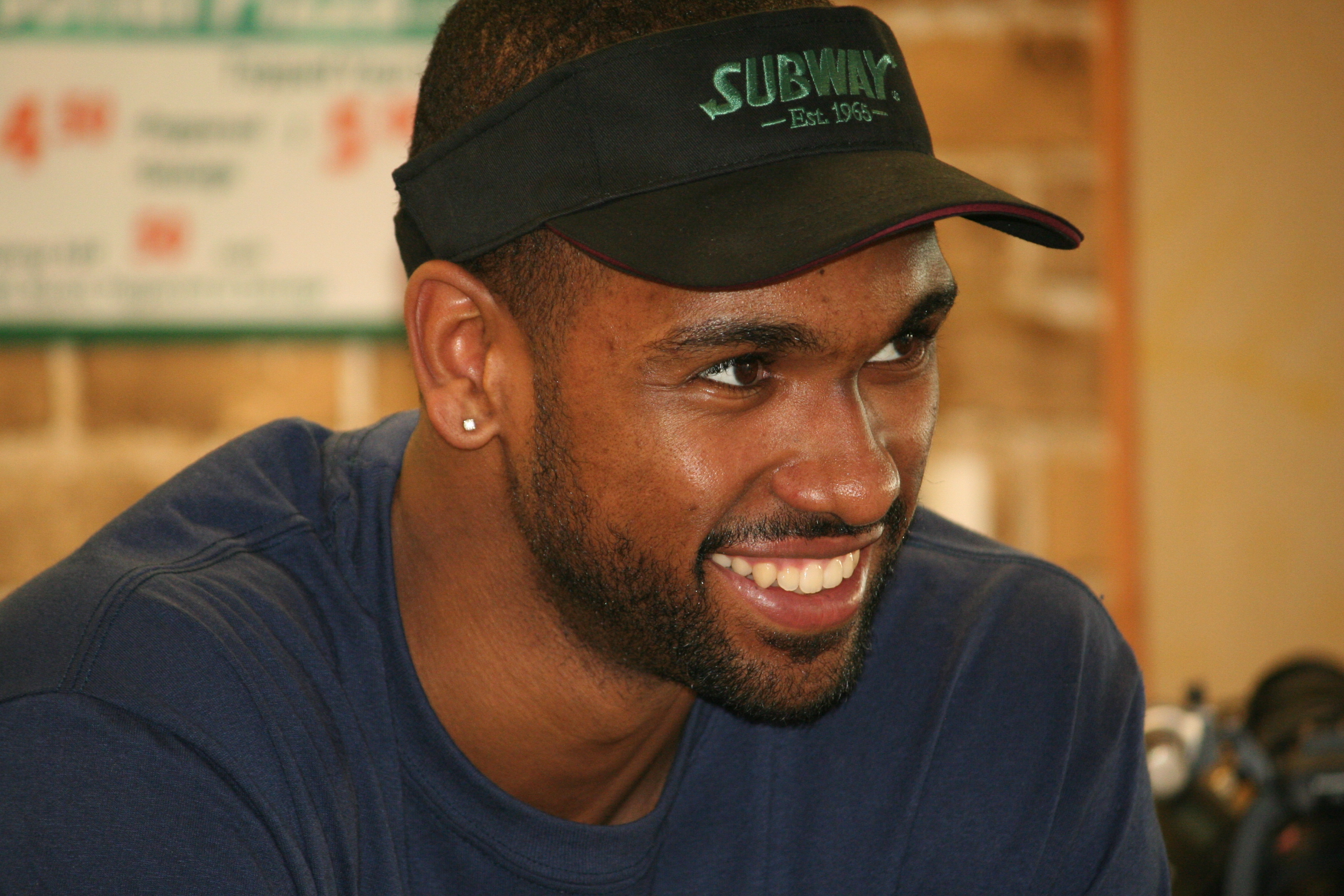
- Southerland in 2012

Personal information
- Born: April 28, 1990 (age 36) Queens, New York, U.S.
- Listed height: 6 ft 8 in (2.03 m)
- Listed weight: 220 lb (100 kg)

Career information
- High school: Cardozo (Bayside, New York); Notre Dame Prep (Fitchburg, Massachusetts)
- College: Syracuse (2009–2013)
- NBA draft: 2013: undrafted
- Playing career: 2013–2023
- Position: Small forward

Career history
- 2013: Charlotte Bobcats
- 2013–2014: Los Angeles D-Fenders
- 2014: New Orleans Pelicans
- 2014: Limoges CSP
- 2015–2016: Vanoli Cremona
- 2016: Mitteldeutscher BC
- 2016: s.Oliver Würzburg
- 2016–2018: Santa Cruz Warriors
- 2017: Indios de Mayagüez
- 2018: South Bay Lakers
- 2018–2019: SeaHorses Mikawa
- 2019–2020: Yokohama B-Corsairs
- 2022: CAB Madeira
- 2022–2023: NBA G League Ignite
- 2023: Wellington Saints

Career highlights
- NBA D-League All-Rookie Second Team (2014)
- Stats at NBA.com
- Stats at Basketball Reference

James Southerland III (born April 28, 1990) is an American former professional basketball player. He played college basketball for the Syracuse Orange.

== High school career ==
Southerland played for Coach Ron Naclerio at Cardozo High School. He participated in the 2006 Reebok ABCD Camp (N.J.). As a junior, he averaged 17.6 points, 11.3 rebounds and 2.6 assists for Cardozo. Southerland helped the squad to a 22–5 record. For 2008–09, he moved to Notre Dame Prep. He was rated 87th among the Class of 2009 small forwards by Scouts Inc.

== College career ==
Over his four-year career, Southerland averaged 7.9 points and 3.3 rebounds while shooting .449 from the field and .370 from three-point range in 112 games. With nine, he tied the school record for made threes in a single game, at Arkansas, on November 30, 2012, while scoring a career-best 35 points. Was named Big East Player of the Week on December 3, 2012. On January 11, 2013, in his final season at Syracuse, Southerland was declared ineligible due to an undisclosed academic issue. He was reinstated on February 10, after missing six games. On senior night at the Carrier Dome, he recorded his first collegiate double-double, by scoring 22 points and grabbing 10 rebounds, against DePaul. During the 2013 Big East tournament, Southerland set records for most three-pointers made in a game without a miss (6 vs Pittsburgh) and total number of threes made (20) in a single tournament, while being named to the All-Tournament team. Was selected as a member of the East Regional All-Tournament team during the 2013 NCAA tournament.

=== College statistics ===
College	Year	GP	GS	MIN	MPG	FG	FGA	FG%	FG3	FG3A	3FG%	FT	FTA	FT%	RPG	APG	SPG	BPG	PTS	PPG
Syracuse	2009–10	13	0	97	7.5	16	39	.410	7	24	.292	2	4	.500	1.2	0.4	0.6	0.5	41	3.2
Syracuse	2010–11	28	2	396	14.1	52	121	.430	25	68	.368	7	10	.700	2.3	0.5	0.5	0.6	136	4.9
Syracuse	2011–12	37	0	593	16.0	96	206	.466	37	110	.336	23	33	.697	3.1	0.4	0.8	0.9	252	6.8
Syracuse	2012–13	34	11	1003	29.5	161	358	.450	84	211	.398	45	57	.789	5.2	1.1	1.5	0.9	451	13.3
Career		112	13	2089	18.7	325	724	.449	153	413	.370	77	104	.740	3.3	0.6	0.9	0.8	880	7.9

== Professional career ==
After going undrafted in the 2013 NBA draft, Southerland played for the Philadelphia 76ers in the Orlando Summer League and the Golden State Warriors in the Las Vegas Summer League. On September 5, 2013, he signed with the Charlotte Bobcats. He was waived by the Bobcats on December 11, 2013, after playing in just one game. He was acquired by the Los Angeles D-Fenders of the NBA D-League eight days later and earned All-Rookie Second Team honors for the 2023–14 season. On April 11, 2014, he signed with the New Orleans Pelicans for the rest of the NBA season.

Southerland played for the Pelicans in the 2014 NBA Summer League and then spent the pre-season with the Portland Trail Blazers.

Between October 2014 and December 2014, Southerland played in France for Limoges CSP.

After playing in the 2015 NBA Summer League for the Oklahoma City Thunder, Southerland moved to Italy to play for Vanoli Cremona. On January 15, 2016, he parted ways with Cremona after averaging 5.1 points and 3.6 rebounds in fourteen games. Two days later, he signed with Mitteldeutscher BC of the Basketball Bundesliga for the rest of the season. He averaged 13.5 points per game for Mitteldeutscher.

Southerland returned to Germany for the 2016–17 season, playing 11 games for s.Oliver Würzburg on a two-month contract. He joined the Santa Cruz Warriors of the NBA G League in December 2016. Following the G League season, he had a six-game stint in Puerto Rico for Indios de Mayagüez.

After playing in the 2017 NBA Summer League for the Utah Jazz, Southerland returned to the Santa Cruz Warriors for the 2017–18 season. On February 13, 2018, he was traded to the South Bay Lakers.

For the 2018–19 season, Southerland moved to Japan to play for SeaHorses Mikawa.

In December 2019, Southerland returned to Japan to play out the 2019–20 season with Yokohama B-Corsairs.

In January 2022, Southerland joined CAB Madeira of the Liga Portuguesa de Basquetebol.

In September 2022, Southerland joined the NBA G League Ignite for the 2022–23 season.

On March 28, 2023, Southerland signed with the Wellington Saints for the 2023 New Zealand NBL season. He appeared in one game before being released on April 19 due to injury.

== Career statistics ==
Legend
GP	Games played	GS	Games started	MPG	Minutes per game
FG%	Field goal percentage	3P%	3-point field goal percentage	FT%	Free throw percentage
RPG	Rebounds per game	APG	Assists per game	SPG	Steals per game
BPG	Blocks per game	PPG	Points per game	**Bold**	Career high

=== NBA ===
==== Regular season ====
Year	Team	GP	GS	MPG	FG%	3P%	FT%	RPG	APG	SPG	BPG	PPG
2013–14	Charlotte	1	0	3.0	.000	.000	–	.0	.0	.0	.0	.0
2013–14	New Orleans	**3**	0	**9.0**	**.417**	**.600**	**.500**	**2.7**	.0	**.3**	**.7**	**4.7**
Career		4	0	7.5	.333	.500	.500	2.0	.0	.3	.5	3.5
