= Whitney Gaskell =

American novelist

- Born: 1972 (age 53–54); DeWitt, New York
- Education: Jamesville-DeWitt High School; Syracuse University (BA); Tulane University Law School
- Occupation: Author
- Writing career
- Pen name: Piper Banks ("Geek High" series); Margot Hunt (thrillers)
- Period: 2003–present
- Genres: women’s fiction, youg adult, thrillers
- Website: margothunt.com

Whitney Gaskell (born 1972) is an American author who writes under her own name as well as several pseudonyms. She published her first novel, Pushing 30, in 2003. She has written women's fiction (under her own name), a young adult series (as Piper Banks), and, most recently, thrillers (as Margot Hunt).

== Biography ==
Whitney Gaskell was born on February 8, 1972, in DeWitt, New York. She attended Jamesville-DeWitt High School, and earned her Bachelor of Arts degree from Syracuse University in 1994. She then attended Tulane Law School, where she was a member of the Tulane Law Review. She served for two years as a law clerk to Paul Womack of the Texas Court of Criminal Appeals, and practiced briefly as a litigator before publishing her first novel, Pushing 30, in 2003.

Gaskell is represented by the Ethan Ellenberg Literary Agency.

Gaskell has also written the Geek High series of young adult novels, published by Penguin Books, writing as Piper Banks. Since 2018 she has written thrillers under the pen name Margot Hunt.

Gaskell lives in South Florida.

== Selected works ==
=== As Whitney Gaskell ===
- Pushing 30 (2003)
- True Love (and Other Lies) (2004)
- She Myself & I (2005)
- Testing Kate (2006)
- Mommy Tracked (2007)
- Good Luck (2008)
- When You Least Expect It (2010)
- Table for Seven (2013)

=== As Piper Banks ===
- Geek High (2007)
- Geek Abroad (2008)
- Summer of the Geek (2010)
- Revenge of the Geek (2010)

=== As Margot Hunt ===
- Best Friends Forever (2018)
- For Better and Worse (2018)
- Lovely Girls (2023)
- The Guests (2024)

== Sources ==
=== Additional sources ===
- Profile of Whitney Gaskell at Syracuse.com
- Author Page for Whitney Gaskell at Goodreads.com
- Interview at Exploring Womanhood
- Interview at Bookreporter.com
- Interview at Chicklitbooks.com
