= B. J. Johnson (basketball) =

American basketball player (born 1995)

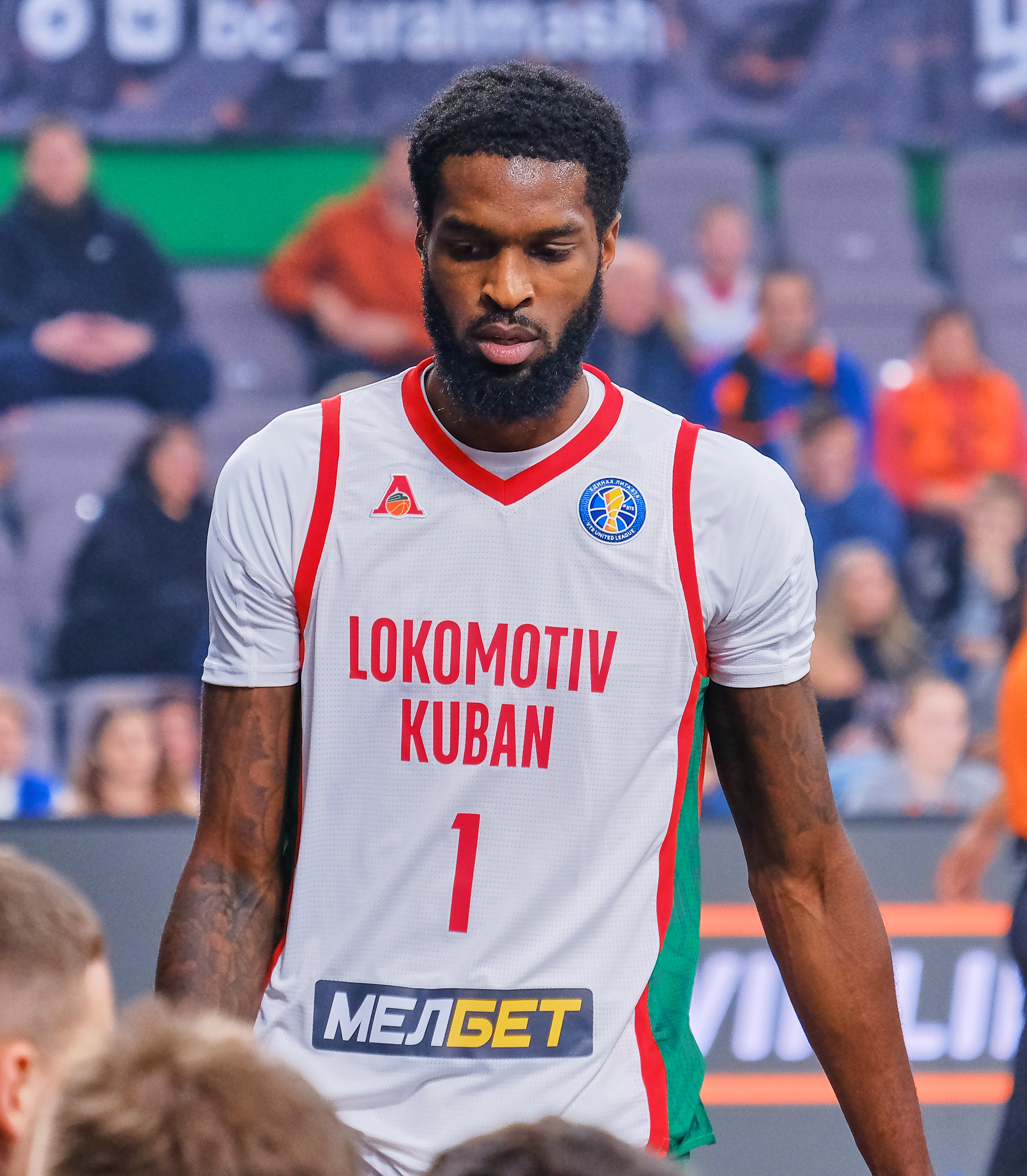
- Johnson with Lokomotiv Kuban in 2026

No. 2 – BC Parma
- Position: Small forward
- League: VTB United League

Personal information
- Born: December 21, 1995 (age 30) Philadelphia, Pennsylvania, U.S.
- Listed height: 6 ft 7 in (2.01 m)
- Listed weight: 200 lb (91 kg)

Career information
- High school: Lower Merion (Ardmore, Pennsylvania)
- College: Syracuse (2013–2015); La Salle (2016–2018)
- NBA draft: 2018: undrafted
- Playing career: 2018–present

Career history
- 2018–2019: Lakeland Magic
- 2019: Atlanta Hawks
- 2019: Sacramento Kings
- 2019–2020: Orlando Magic
- 2019–2020: →Lakeland Magic
- 2021: Long Island Nets
- 2021: Brisbane Bullets
- 2021–2022: Lakeland Magic
- 2021: Orlando Magic
- 2022–2023: Real Betis
- 2023–2024: Parma
- 2024–2026: Lokomotiv Kuban
- 2026: Phoenix Super LPG Fuel Masters
- 2026–present: Parma

Career highlights
- All-NBA G League Second Team (2020); Second-team All-Atlantic 10 (2018)
- Stats at NBA.com
- Stats at Basketball Reference

Robert Johnson Jr. (born December 21, 1995) is an American professional basketball for Parma of the VTB United League. He played college basketball for La Salle and Syracuse.

== High school career ==
Johnson is the son of Robert Johnson, who played basketball at La Salle University from 1986 to 1990. The younger Johnson grew up outside Philadelphia and attended Lower Merion High School, NBA Hall-of-Famer Kobe Bryant's alma mater. He had 22 points and 11 rebounds in a win over Chester High School in the 2013 state championship. Johnson was a top-100 high school prospect.

== College career ==
Johnson originally committed to Syracuse out of high school. He averaged 4.1 points and 3.1 rebounds per game for the Orange as a sophomore in 2014–15. After the season, he decided to transfer to La Salle. He explained that coach John Giannini told him he would be an impact player after sitting out the requisite year. Johnson scored 35 points in a December 2016 win over Florida Gulf Coast. As a junior at La Salle, Johnson led the team in points (17.6 per game) and rebounds (6.3) per game. He was named to the All-Big 5 first team. After the season he declared for the 2017 NBA draft, but ultimately withdrew his name. As a senior, Johnson was named to the All-Atlantic 10 second team. He was also named to the All-Big 5 first team after a season in which he averaged 20.8 points per game, the most for an Explorer since Rasual Butler in 2002, as well as leading the team with 8.3 rebounds per game. He graduated from La Salle with a degree in finance.

== Professional career ==
=== Lakeland Magic (2018–2019) ===
After going undrafted in the 2018 NBA draft, Johnson signed with the Charlotte Hornets for NBA Summer League competition. On September 5, 2018, Johnson signed with the Orlando Magic. He was waived by the Magic on October 10 but would play for their G League affiliate the Lakeland Magic. On October 23, 2018, Johnson was included in Lakeland's training camp roster.

=== Atlanta Hawks (2019) ===
On March 1, 2019, Johnson signed a 10-day contract with the Atlanta Hawks. Johnson made his NBA debut two days later, putting up 11 points on perfect 4-of-4 shooting (3-of-3 three-point shooting), 2 rebounds, and a steal during 19 minutes of action in a 123–118 win over the Chicago Bulls. On March 12, Johnson signed a second 10-day contract. After the expiration of his second 10-day contract, Johnson returned to the Lakeland Magic.

=== Sacramento Kings (2019) ===
On April 2, 2019, Johnson signed a rest-of-season contract with the Sacramento Kings. On July 19, 2019, Johnson was waived by the Kings.

=== Orlando Magic (2019–2020) ===
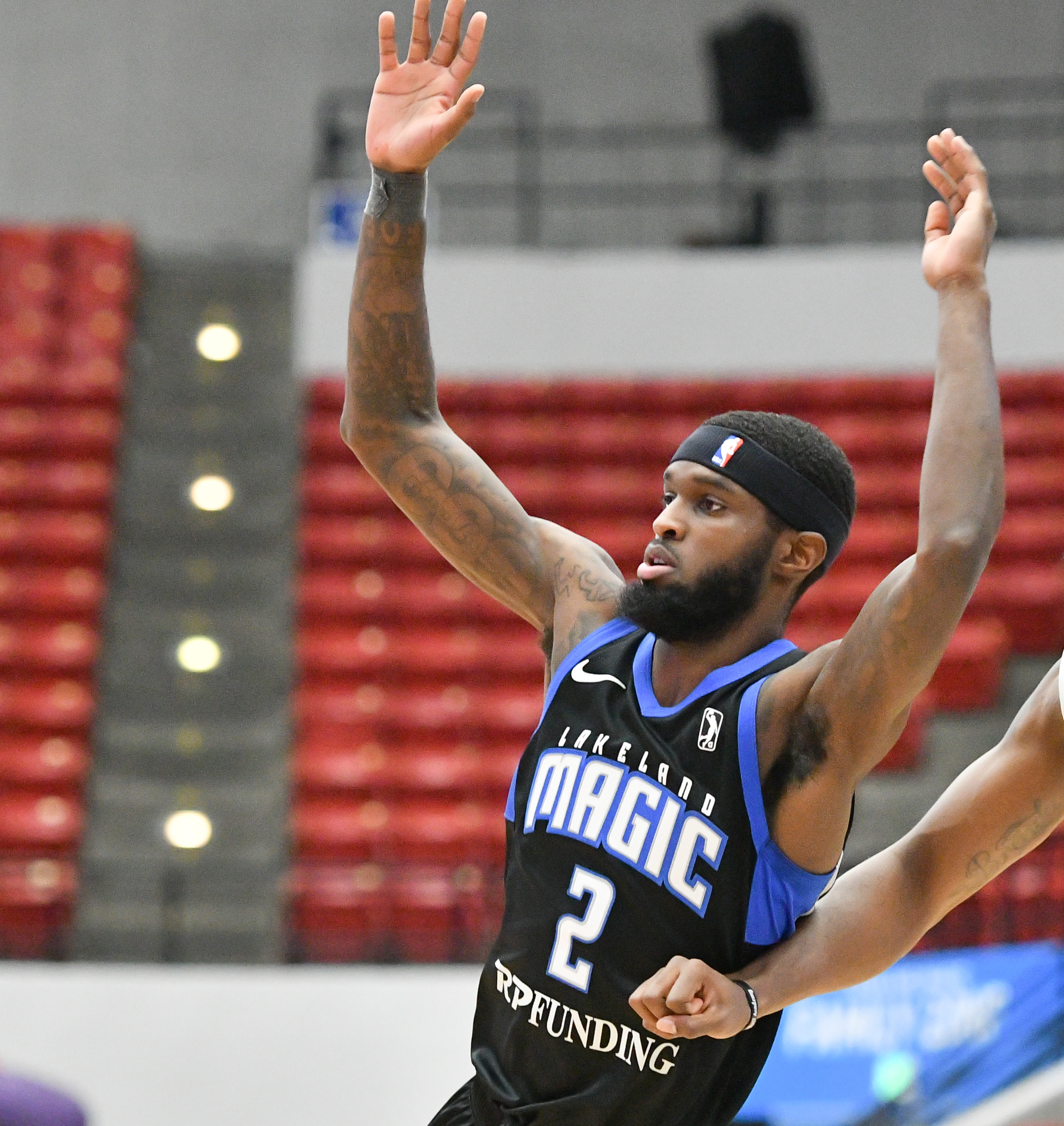
Johnson in 2019

On September 27, 2019, Johnson re-signed with the Orlando Magic for training camp; however, he was waived on October 19. On November 4, the Magic signed him to a two-way contract. On January 4, 2020, Johnson, playing for Orlando's G League affiliate Lakeland Magic, tallied 35 points, eight rebounds and two assists in the G League against the Canton Charge. He averaged 22.9 points, 6.4 rebounds and 2.1 steals per game for Lakeland. Johnson was named to the All-NBA G League Second Team.

=== Long Island Nets (2021) ===
On December 4, 2020, Johnson signed with the Miami Heat. On December 19, 2020, Johnson was waived by the Heat. He was added to the Long Island Nets roster and made his debut on February 10, 2021. In 14 games, he averaged 18.4 points, 5.6 rebounds, 1.6 assists and 1.0 steals in 31.1 minutes per game.

=== Brisbane Bullets (2021) ===
On April 19, 2021, Johnson signed with the Brisbane Bullets of the Australian National Basketball League for the remainder of the 2020–21 season. In 11 games, he averaged 10.0 points and 3.7 rebounds in 21.5 minutes per game.

=== Second stint with Lakeland / Orlando Magic (2021–2022) ===
On October 15, 2021, Johnson signed with the Orlando Magic, but was waived the next day. On October 28, he re-signed with the Lakeland Magic as an affiliate player where he played 10 games and averaged 24.7 points, 7.5 rebounds, 1.3 assists and 1.0 steals in 34.5 minutes per game.

On December 17, 2021, Johnson signed a 10-day contract with the Orlando Magic. and on January 4, 2022, he was reacquired and activated by Lakeland.

=== Real Betis (2022–2023) ===
On April 6, 2022, Johnson signed with Coosur Real Betis of the Spanish Liga ACB.

=== Phoenix Super LPG Fuel Masters (2026) ===
In June 2026, Johnson signed with the Phoenix Super LPG Fuel Masters as the team's import for the 2026 PBA Governors' Cup.

== Career statistics ==
Legend
GP	Games played	GS	Games started	MPG	Minutes per game
FG%	Field goal percentage	3P%	3-point field goal percentage	FT%	Free throw percentage
RPG	Rebounds per game	APG	Assists per game	SPG	Steals per game
BPG	Blocks per game	PPG	Points per game	**Bold**	Career high

=== NBA ===
==== Regular season ====
Year	Team	GP	GS	MPG	FG%	3P%	FT%	RPG	APG	SPG	BPG	PPG
2018–19	Atlanta	6	0	7.2	**.500**	**.500**	**1.000**	1.3	.0	**.3**	.0	3.5
2018–19	Sacramento	1	0	6.0	**.500**	.000	—	.0	.0	.0	.0	2.0
2019–20	Orlando	**10**	0	8.3	.281	.333	.900	1.5	**.3**	**.3**	.0	3.0
2021–22	Orlando	4	0	**16.3**	.440	.400	—	**3.8**	.0	.0	**.3**	**6.5**
Career		21	0	9.4	.387	.385	.917	1.8	.1	.2	.0	3.8

==== Playoffs ====
Year	Team	GP	GS	MPG	FG%	3P%	FT%	RPG	APG	SPG	BPG	PPG
2020	Orlando	1	0	4.0	.500	1.000	–	2.0	.0	.0	.0	3.0

=== College ===
Year	Team	GP	GS	MPG	FG%	3P%	FT%	RPG	APG	SPG	BPG	PPG
2013–14	Syracuse	10	0	5.5	.250	.125	—	.9	.2	.1	.3	1.4
2014–15	Syracuse	25	4	14.6	.307	.262	.720	3.2	.5	.6	.2	4.2
2016–17	La Salle	**29**	**28**	32.6	**.449**	**.362**	.838	6.3	**1.0**	1.1	.5	17.6
2017–18	La Salle	27	27	**35.2**	.446	.359	**.869**	**8.3**	.7	**1.3**	**.7**	**20.8**
Career		91	59	25.5	.426	.335	.843	5.5	.7	.9	0.5	13.1
