= Brandon Triche =

American professional basketball player

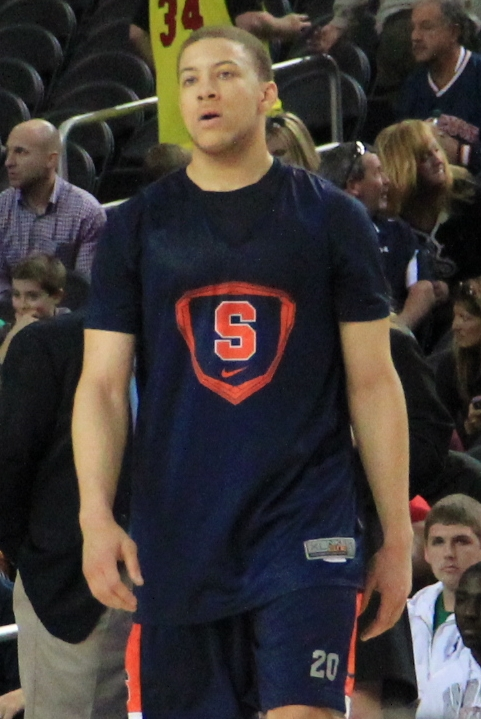
- Triche with Syracuse in 2013

Personal information
- Born: February 21, 1991 (age 35) Syracuse, New York, U.S.
- Listed height: 6 ft 4 in (1.93 m)
- Listed weight: 210 lb (95 kg)

Career information
- High school: Jamesville-DeWitt (DeWitt, New York)
- College: Syracuse (2009–2013)
- NBA draft: 2013: undrafted
- Playing career: 2013–2023
- Position: Point guard / shooting guard

Career history
- 2013–2014: Aquila Basket Trento
- 2014–2015: Virtus Roma
- 2016–2017: Delaware 87ers
- 2017: Salt Lake City Stars
- 2017: Bnei Herzliya
- 2017: PAOK
- 2017–2018: Bnei Herzliya
- 2018–2019: Orlandina Basket
- 2019–2020: Pınar Karşıyaka
- 2020–2023: Shabab Al Ahli Basket

Career highlights
- Co‐Mr. New York Basketball (2009)
- Stats at Basketball Reference

Brandon Stephan Triche (/trɪʃ/ TRISH; born February 21, 1991) is an American former professional basketball player who last played for Shabab Al Ahli Basket of the UAE National Basketball League. He played college basketball for Syracuse, and in 2012, he was featured on the cover of Sports Illustrated's college basketball preview issue.

== High school career ==
Brandon Triche was a four-year starter at Jamesville-DeWitt High School, and was co-Mr. New York Basketball in 2009, along with Lance Stephenson. In his senior year, he played on the same team as freshman center DaJuan Coleman.

== College career ==
Triche started every Syracuse game in his four-year NCAA Division I college basketball playing career. He is the only Syracuse player to win at least 120 games as a starter.

=== College statistics ===
Year	GP-GS	MPG	PPG	FG%	RPG	APG	TPG	SPG	BPG
2009–10	35-35	21.3	8.1	50%	1.8	2.8	2.0	0.9	0.1
2010–11	35-35	28.8	11.1	42%	2.7	2.9	2.1	0.8	0.1
2011–12	37-37	22.5	9.4	42%	2.5	2.7	1.5	1.1	0.1
2012–13	40-40	33.7	13.8	42%	3.4	3.6	2.7	0.9	0.1

=== College career highs ===
- Points: 29 versus Seton Hall, senior year
- Assists: 8 versus Monmouth

== Professional career ==
After going undrafted in the 2013 NBA draft, Triche signed a one-year deal with Aquila Basket Trento of the Italian Second Division on August 6, 2013.

In July 2014, Triche joined the New York Knicks for the 2014 NBA Summer League. On July 24, he signed a one-year deal with Virtus Roma. On March 10, 2015, Roma released him.

Triche underwent surgery for a torn anterior cruciate ligament and was unable to play in the 2015–16 season.

On October 29, 2016, Triche was acquired by the Delaware 87ers of the NBA Development League. On March 3, 2017, Triche was traded to the Salt Lake City Stars.

On April 9, 2017, Triche signed with Israeli club Bnei Herzliya for the rest of the 2016–17 season. He helped Herzliya to reach the 2017 Israeli League Playoffs, where they eventually were eliminated by Maccabi Tel Aviv.

On September 8, 2017, Triche signed with Greek club PAOK for the 2017–18 season. He officially parted ways with PAOK on December 23, 2017. One week later, Triche returned to Bnei Herzliya for a second stint, signing for the rest of the 2017–18 season. On January 4, 2018, he made his debut in an 87–95 loss to Maccabi Ashdod, recording 21 points, 3 rebounds and 3 steals off the bench.

On August 6, 2018, Triche signed a one-year deal with the Italian team Orlandina Basket of the Serie A2 Basket.

On July 19, 2019, he has signed 2-year contract with Pınar Karşıyaka of the Turkish Basketbol Süper Ligi. Triche averaged 9.6 points, 2.1 rebounds and 3.2 assists per game. On September 7, 2020, Triche signed with Shabab Al Ahli Basket of the UAE National Basketball League for the playoffs. He re-signed with the team on October 27.

== The Basketball Tournament ==
In the summer of 2017, Triche competed in The Basketball Tournament (TBT) on ESPN for Boeheim's Army, a team composed of Syracuse basketball alumni. In five games, he averaged 11.2 points, 6.0 assists and 5.2 rebounds per game (including an 11-point, 12-assist, 11-rebound triple-double in the first round) to help lead Boeheim's Army to the semifinal round where they fell, 81–77, to the eventual champions Overseas Elite. Triche also played for Boeheim's Army in 2016. In three games that summer, he averaged 11.0 points, 3.7 rebounds and 2.3 assists per game. In TBT 2018, Triche averaged 7 points, 3.3 assists, and 4 rebounds per game for Boeheim's Army. They reached the regional championship before falling to the Golden Eagles.

== Personal life ==
Triche's paternal uncle, Howard Triche, played college basketball at Syracuse as well, from 1983 to 1987. He is also cousins with 10 year NBA vet Jason Hart.
