= Trevor Cooney =

American basketball player (born 1992)

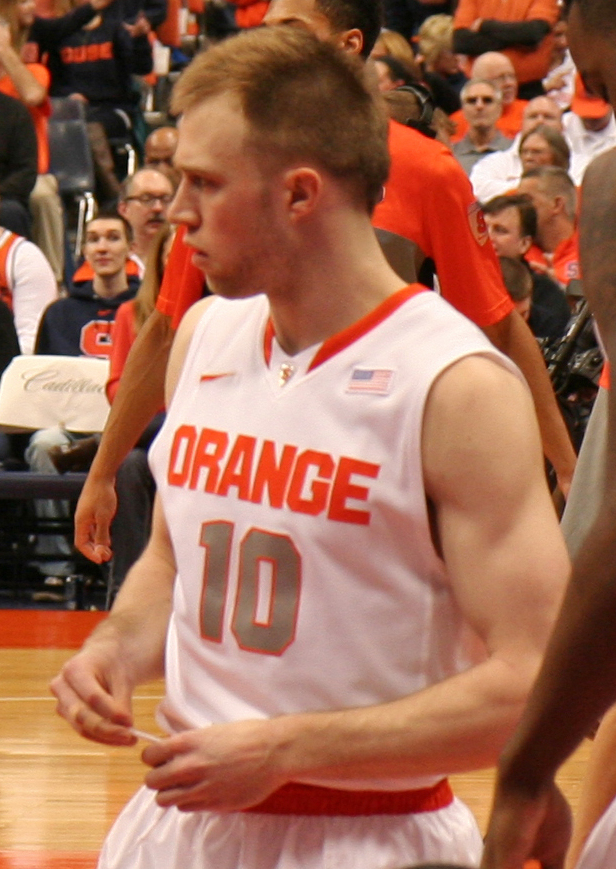
- Cooney with the Syracuse Orange in 2014

Personal information
- Born: August 1, 1992 (age 34) Wilmington, Delaware, U.S.
- Listed height: 6 ft 4 in (1.93 m)
- Listed weight: 195 lb (88 kg)

Career information
- High school: Sanford School (Hockessin, Delaware)
- College: Syracuse (2012–2016)
- NBA draft: 2016: undrafted
- Playing career: 2016–2018
- Position: Shooting guard

Career history
- 2016: Baskonia
- 2016: Rasta Vechta
- 2017: Long Island Nets
- 2017–2018: Coruña
Medals
Men's basketball
Representing the United States
FIBA Americas U18 Championship
Gold medal – first place	2010 San Antonio	Team

Trevor Donald Cooney (born August 1, 1992) is an American professional basketball player who last played for Leyma Coruña of the LEB Oro.

== High school career ==
Cooney, a 6'4" guard, grew up in Wilmington, Delaware, and attended the Sanford School. He led the Warriors to two state championships. By the time Cooney graduated, he was the school's all-time scoring leader.

== College career ==
Cooney red shirted his freshman season at Syracuse with the Orange, since he realized that minutes were limited in a back court that also contained Scoop Jardine, Brandon Triche, Dion Waiters, and Michael Carter-Williams. On Syracuse's 2012–13 Final Four team, he played infrequent minutes. In his final three seasons, he started 102 consecutive games. In his red shirt senior year, he became the first Syracuse player in school history to play for two Final Four teams, averaging 12.7 points per game for the season. Cooney scored 22 points, on 9-of-18 shooting from the field, in his final game in an Orange uniform, an 83–66 loss to North Carolina. Cooney scored 1,437 points in his college career, and he shot .337% from the 3-point range. His 281 made three-pointers trails only Gerry McNamara and Andy Rautins, in the school's record books.

== Professional career ==
On August 15, 2016, Cooney signed for the Long Island Nets of the NBA Development League. In August 2016, he joined Baskonia for the preseason. One month later, he extended his contract for two more months. On November 11, 2016, he signed with Rasta Vechta of the German Basketball Bundesliga. On December 30, 2016, he parted ways with Vechta after averaging 3.4 points per game. On January 18, 2017, he was acquired by the Long Island Nets of the NBA Development League.

On August 5, 2017, Cooney signed with Leyma Coruña of the LEB Oro.

In June 2018, one of Cooney's best friends Sean Locke committed suicide. Since then, Cooney has become an advocate for mental health awareness. He is a board member of the Unlocke the Light Foundation which sponsors a basketball tournament in his honor.

== The Basketball Tournament (TBT) ==
In the summer of 2017, Cooney competed in The Basketball Tournament on ESPN for Boeheim's Army; a team composed of Syracuse University basketball alum. In five games, he averaged 6.8 points and 2.0 rebounds per game to help lead Boeheim's Army to the Semifinal Round where they fell 81–77 to the eventual champions Overseas Elite.
