= Jamesville-DeWitt High School =

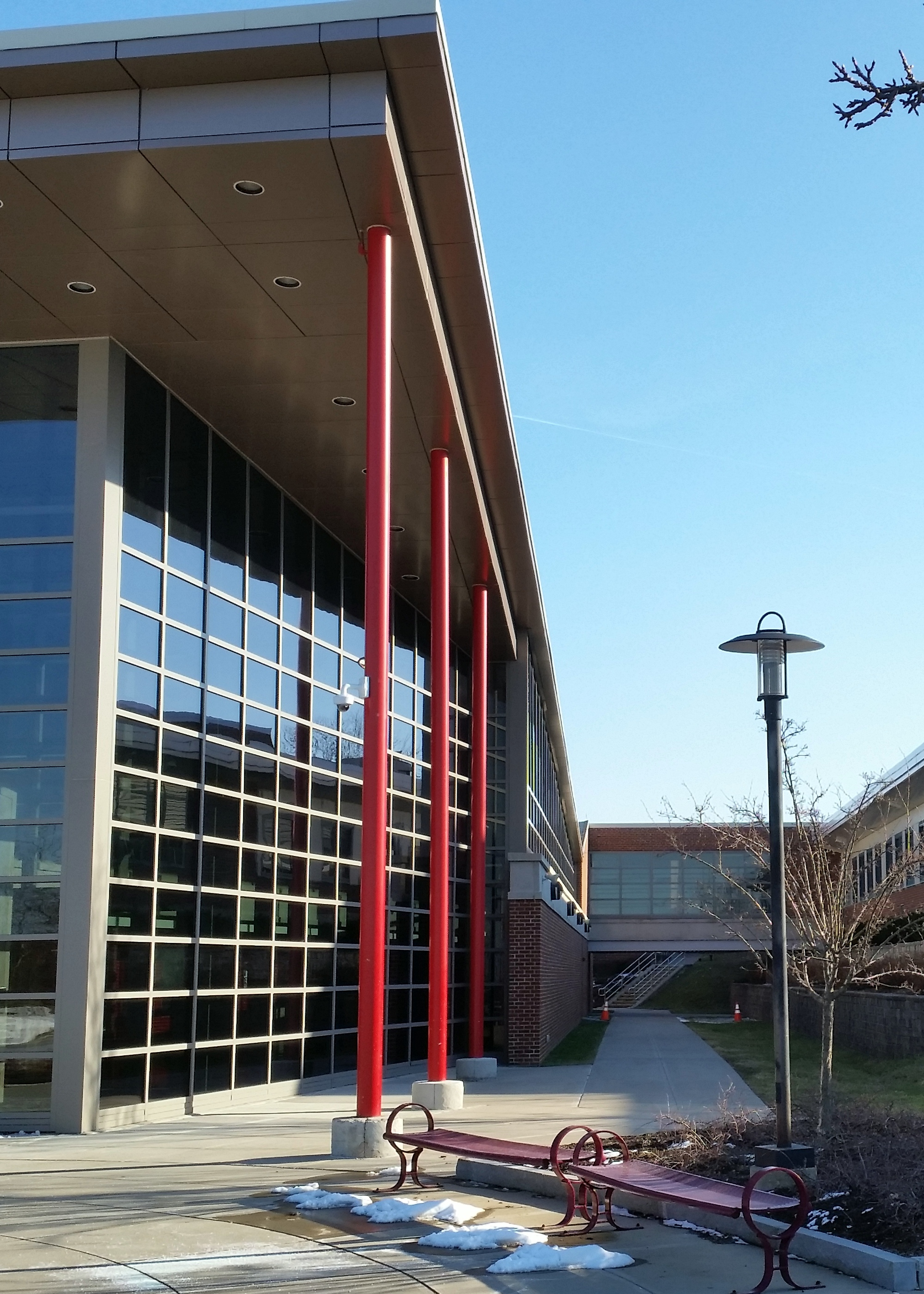

Location
- 6845 Edinger Dr; DeWitt, New York 13066; United States; 43.019411°N 76.045496°W

Information
- Type: Public
- School district: Jamesville-DeWitt Central School District
- NCES School ID: 360909000697
- Principal: Gregory Lawson
- Teaching staff: 71.40 (on an FTE basis)
- Grades: 9-12
- Enrollment: 843 (2023-2024)
- Student to teacher ratio: 11.81
- Campus: Suburban: Medium
- Colors: Red and White
- Athletics conference: Salt City Athletic Conference
- Mascot: Red Rams
- Yearbook: Hilltop Echoes
- Website: www.jamesvilledewitt.org/j-d-high-school/

Jamesville-DeWitt High School (J-DHS) is a New York state public education facility located in the town of DeWitt, serving high school students (grades 9–12) in the Jamesville-Dewitt Central School District.

== Notable alumni ==
Athletics

- Buddy Boeheim, professional basketball player in the NBA
- Tyler Cavanaugh, former professional basketball player in the NBA
- Andy Rautins, former professional basketball player in the GBL
- Danny Schayes, former professional basketball player in the NBA
- Brandon Triche, professional basketball player in the UAE
- Robert Drummond, former professional football player in the NFL and CFL
- Scott Schwedes, former professional football player in the NFL
- Suzy Whaley, former professional golfer on the LPGA Tour; first woman president of the PGA of America
- Katie Cappelletti, professional soccer player in the NWSL

Literature

- Whitney Gaskell, novelist

Music

- Jon Fishman, drummer and founding member of Phish
- Eliot Fisk, classical guitarist
- Spencer Murphy, bassist, producer, and composer
- Walt Weiskopf, saxophonist who has collaborated with Steely Dan and others

TV & Film

- Mike Royce, screenwriter and television producer; Emmy Award winner for Everybody Loves Raymond
- Mark Dindal, filmmaker known for directing Cats Don't Dance, The Emperor's New Groove, and Chicken Little
- Zackary Drucker, television producer and Emmy Award nominee for the docuseries This Is Me
- Carmen Emmi, director of Plainclothes

Politics

- Eric Schultz, political advisor and former deputy White House press secretary from 2014 to 2017
