= 2013 NCAA Division I men's basketball championship game =

American college basketball final

2013 NCAA Tournament Championship Game
National championship game
Michigan Wolverines	Louisville Cardinals
Big Ten	Big East
(31–7)	(34–5 (now 0-5) (Note: On February 20, 2018, the NCAA announced that Louisville will be forced to vacate wins and records from the 2011–12, 2012–13, 2013–14, and 2014–15 seasons.))
76	82
Head coach: John Beilein	Head coach: Rick Pitino
- AP: T-10
- Coaches: 11
- AP: 2
- Coaches: 2
	1st half	2nd half	Total
Michigan Wolverines	38	38	76
Louisville Cardinals	37	45	82
- Date: April 8, 2013
- Venue: Georgia Dome, Atlanta, Georgia
- MVP: Luke Hancock, Louisville
- Favorite: Louisville by 5
- Referees: John Cahill, John Higgins, Tony Greene
- Attendance: 74,326

United States TV coverage
- Network: CBS
- Announcers: Jim Nantz (play-by-play); Clark Kellogg and Steve Kerr (color); Tracy Wolfson (sideline)
- Nielsen Ratings: 14.0 (23.4 million)

The 2013 NCAA Division I men's basketball championship game was the finals of the 2013 NCAA Division I men's basketball tournament and it determined the national champion for the 2012–13 NCAA Division I men's basketball season. The game was played on April 8, 2013, at the Georgia Dome in Atlanta, Georgia, and featured the Midwest Regional Champion, #1-seeded Louisville, and the South Regional Champion, #4-seeded Michigan.

Louisville's title was subsequently vacated by the NCAA on June 15, 2017, as the result of a sex scandal involving players on the team, as well as potential recruits. This decision was upheld on February 20, 2018, resulting in no national champion being recognised for the season.

== Participants ==
=== Michigan Wolverines ===
Michigan, who was led by 2013 national player of the year Trey Burke, was a #4 seed in the South Regional of the 2013 NCAA tournament. In the 2nd round, Glenn Robinson III scored 21 points to lead the Wolverines past South Dakota State 71–56. In the 3rd Round, Michigan crushed VCU with a 78–53 win to advance to the Sweet 16 for the 1st time since 1994. Against Kansas, Burke made a long game-tying three-pointer with 4.2 seconds left to send the game to overtime, and Michigan would then win to advance to the Elite Eight. Michigan routed Florida 79–59 to advance to the Final Four for the 1st time since 1993. Against Syracuse, with Michigan leading 58–56 with 19.2 seconds left, Jordan Morgan took the charge and Brandon Triche was called for an offensive foul. Then, Jon Horford made 1 of 2 free throws for a 59–56 lead. With 6 seconds left, Trevor Cooney missed a jump shot and Tim Hardaway Jr. got the rebound, then Caris LeVert threw it all the way to Morgan, who would dunk it in for a 61–56 win over Syracuse and a trip to the national championship game.

Michigan was competing for its second national championship. This was the Wolverines' sixth national title game appearance (1965, 1976, 1989, 1992, 1993), and its first since 1993, where the Fab Five-led Wolverines fell to North Carolina (Michigan's 1992 and 1993 championship game appearances were vacated due to NCAA sanctions involving the eligibility of Chris Webber).

=== Louisville Cardinals ===
Louisville was the #1 overall seed in the 2013 NCAA tournament and was placed in the Midwest Regional. Louisville had no trouble beating North Carolina A&T in the 2nd round with an easy 79–48 win. In the 3rd Round, Russ Smith scored 27 points as Louisville crushed Colorado State 82–56. In the Sweet 16, Russ Smith scored 31 points to beat Oregon 77–69 for a trip to the Elite Eight. Then the Cardinals overcame Kevin Ware's injury to beat Duke 85–63 and advance to the 2013 Final Four. Louisville survived the surprising Wichita State team to advance to the 2013 National Championship Game.

This was Louisville's third trip to the National Title Game and it also vied for its third national title (which was later vacated).

== Starting lineups ==
Michigan	Position		Louisville
† Trey Burke	G		Peyton Siva
Tim Hardaway Jr.	G		Russ Smith
Nik Stauskas	G		Wayne Blackshear
Glenn Robinson III	F		Chane Behanan
Mitch McGary	F	C	Gorgui Dieng
† 2013 Consensus First Team All-American

== Game summary ==
CBS

April 8, 2013
9:23pm EDT

Recap

#S4 Michigan Wolverines 76, #MW1 ~~Louisville Cardinals~~ 82
Scoring by half: 38–37, 38–45
Pts: Trey Burke, 24; Rebs: Mitch McGary, 6 Asts: Tim Hardaway Jr., 4	Pts: Luke Hancock, 22; Rebs: Chane Behanan, 12; Asts: Gorgui Dieng, 6

Georgia Dome, Atlanta, Georgia
Attendance: 74,326
Referees: John Cahill, John Higgins, Tony Greene

=== First half ===
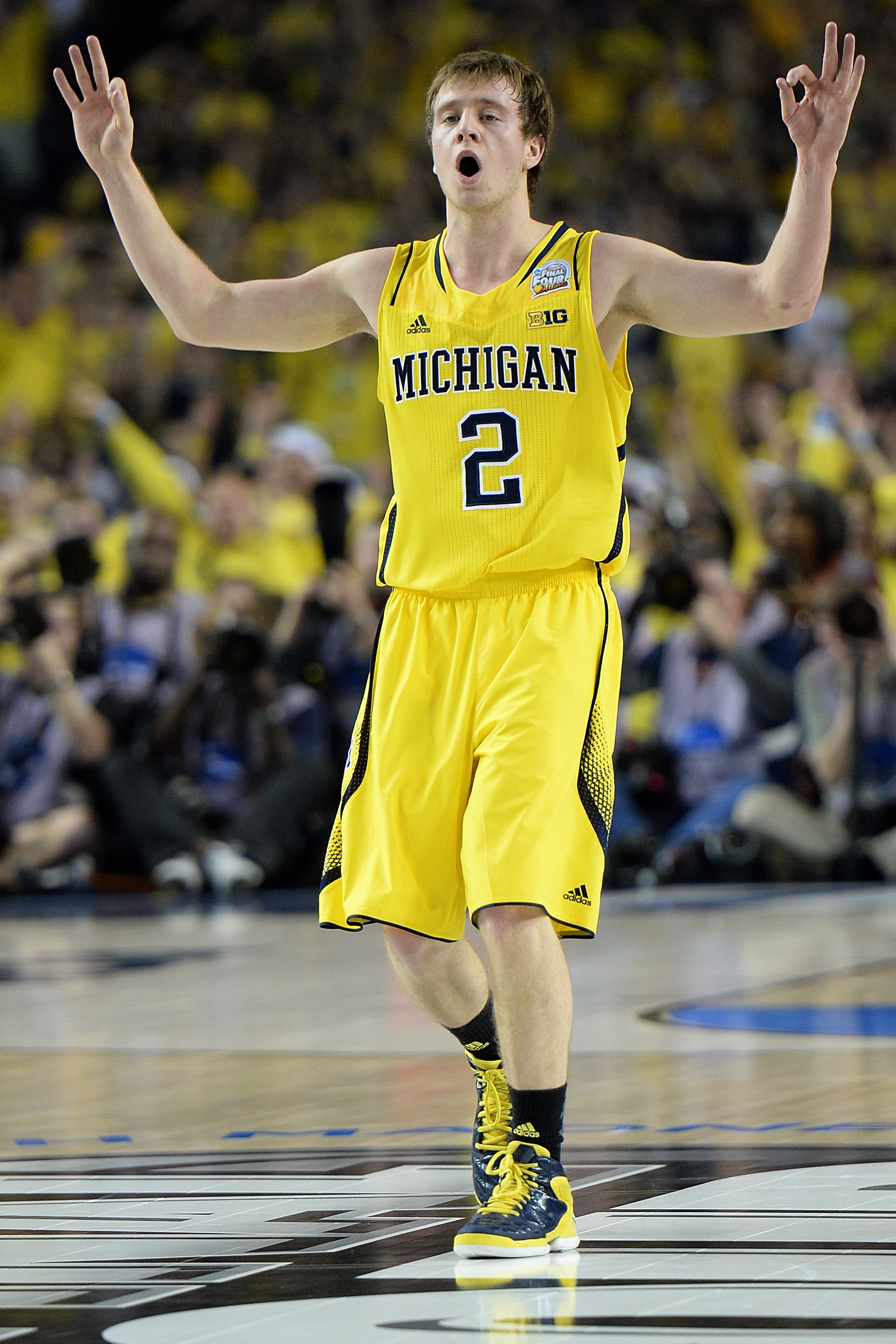
Spike Albrecht scored 17 points during the first half of the 2013 National Championship Game.

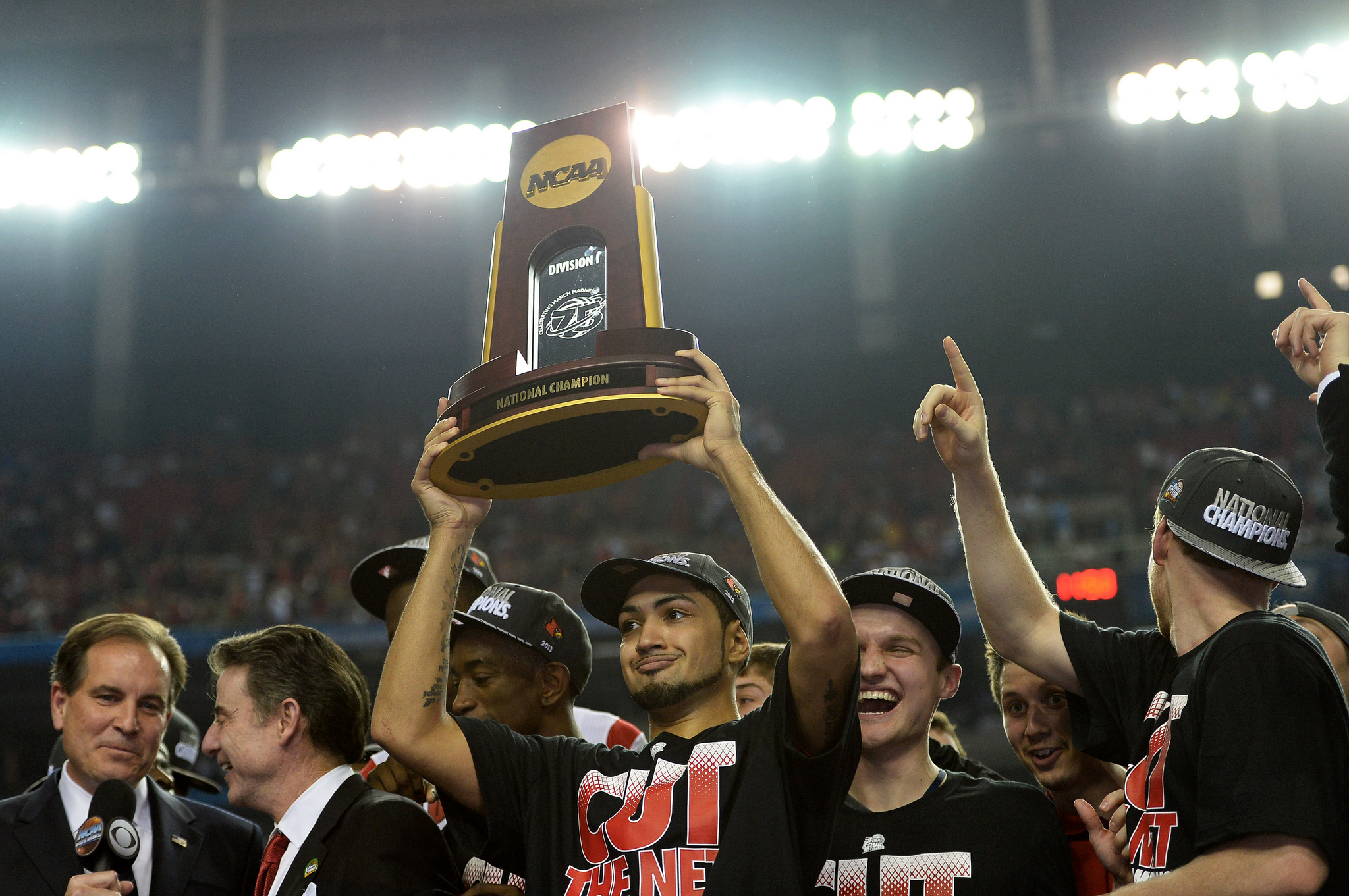
Louisville celebrates its 2013 National Championship that was later vacated.

Trey Burke scored seven quick points to get Michigan out to an early 7–3 lead. But then he picked up two fouls and would be forced to sit on the bench. Spike Albrecht, replacing him, made four consecutive three-pointers leading to a 17-point first-half performance and Michigan would be up 35–23. But, Luke Hancock made four consecutive three-pointers to cut the Michigan lead to 38–37 at halftime.

=== Second half ===
The 2nd half featured several lead changes, then with 5:09 remaining, Trey Burke was called for a controversial foul on a block attempt of a Peyton Siva layup. Siva made both free throws for a Louisville 69–64 lead. With 3:27 left, Luke Hancock made a three-pointer to give Louisville a 76–66 lead. Michigan took the game to an 80–76 deficit with 14 seconds left, but Siva made two free throws to give Louisville an 82–76 win. With 22 points, Hancock was named the 2013 NCAA Tournament Most Outstanding Player.

This was the third consecutive loss in the championship game for Michigan, bringing their record in the title game to 1–5.

== Aftermath ==
On February 20, 2018, the NCAA announced that the wins and records for Louisville's 2011–12, 2012–13, 2013–14, and 2014–15 seasons were vacated due to the sex scandal at Louisville, including the 2013 National Championship. Louisville became the first team in college basketball history to vacate a national championship, and the second team overall to vacate a national championship in college sports after USC vacated its 2004 national championship after an investigation into the eligibility of Reggie Bush. Unlike forfeiture, a vacated game does not result in the other school being credited with a win, only with Louisville removing the wins from its own record. On September 30, 2019, a group of players on the 2012–13 Cardinals team who were not involved in the rules violations settled a lawsuit they had filed against the NCAA. Most of the settlement was confidential, but one portion was authorized to be revealed—while Louisville's team records (including the national title) remain vacated, all honors and statistics for these players were restored. Most notably, Luke Hancock, a plaintiff in the suit, was once again officially recognized as the Most Outstanding Player of the 2013 Final Four.

Michigan would return to the national championship game in 2018, but they would lose to Villanova. This brought the Wolverines' record in the national championship game to 1–6, the worst record among teams that have previously won a national championship. Michigan would eventually earn redemption in 2026, as they defeated UConn to win their second championship.
