= Trey Burke =

American basketball player (born 1992)

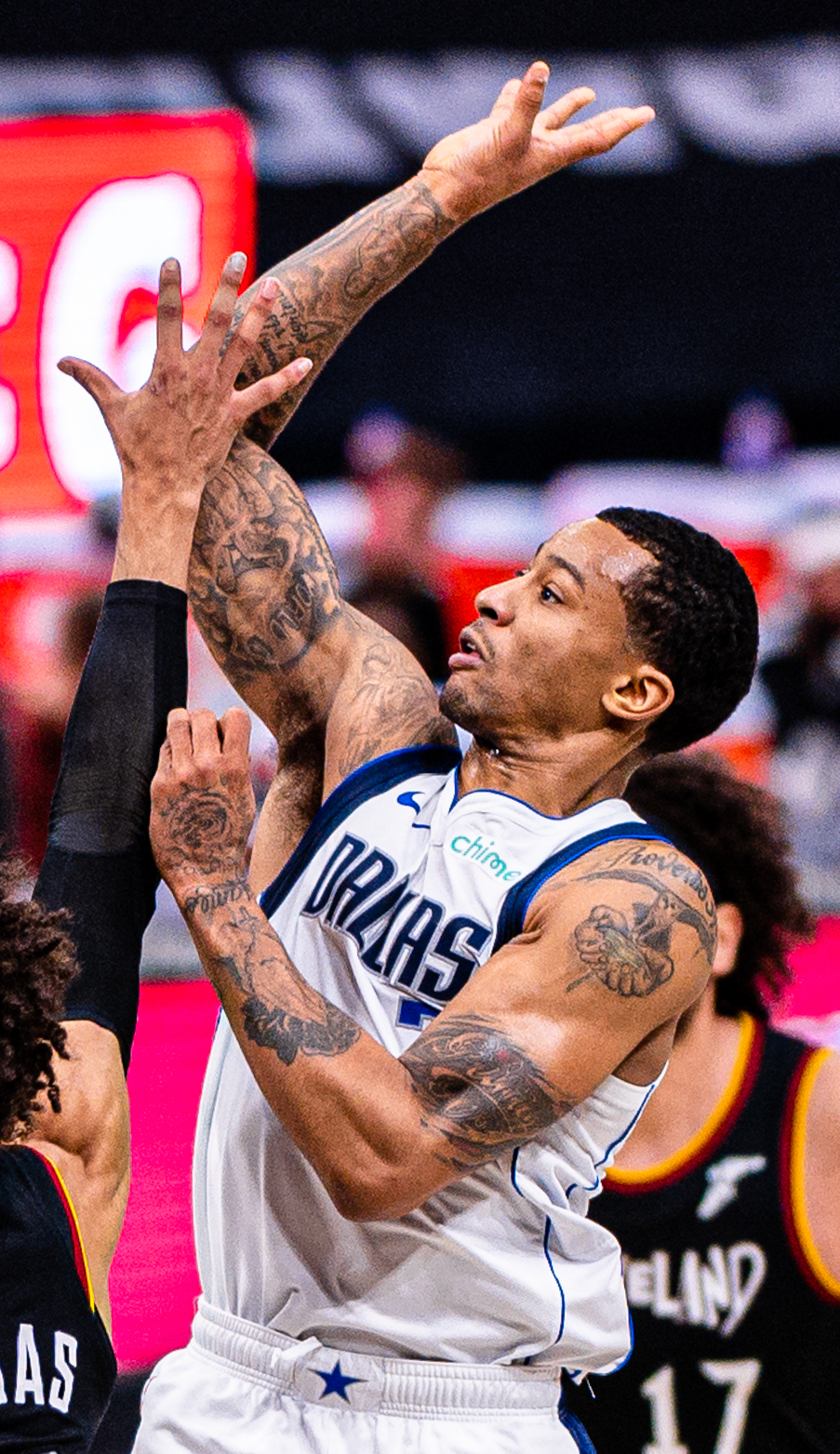
- Burke with the Dallas Mavericks in 2021

Personal information
- Born: November 12, 1992 (age 34) Columbus, Ohio, U.S.
- Listed height: 6 ft 0 in (1.83 m)
- Listed weight: 185 lb (84 kg)

Career information
- High school: Northland (Columbus, Ohio)
- College: Michigan (2011–2013)
- NBA draft: 2013: 1st round, 9th overall pick
- Drafted by: Minnesota Timberwolves
- Playing career: 2013–2026
- Position: Point guard
- Number: 3, 33, 23, 32, 2, 12

Career history
- 2013–2016: Utah Jazz
- 2016–2017: Washington Wizards
- 2017–2018: Westchester Knicks
- 2018–2019: New York Knicks
- 2019: Dallas Mavericks
- 2019–2020: Philadelphia 76ers
- 2020–2022: Dallas Mavericks
- 2022–2023: Stockton Kings
- 2023: Mexico City Capitanes
- 2024: Mets de Guaynabo
- 2024–2025: Mexico City Capitanes
- 2025: Guangdong Southern Tigers
- 2025: Leones de Ponce
- 2026: Astros de Jalisco

Career highlights
- NBA All-Rookie First Team (2014); Third-team All NBA G League (2018); National college player of the year (2013); Consensus first-team All-American (2013); Bob Cousy Award (2013); Big Ten Player of the Year (2013); First-team All-Big Ten (2013); Big Ten Freshman of the Year (2012); Second-team Parade All-American (2011); Ohio Mr. Basketball (2011)
- Stats at NBA.com
- Stats at Basketball Reference

Alfonso Clark "Trey" Burke III (born November 12, 1992) is an American former professional basketball player. He played college basketball for the Michigan Wolverines where in the 2012–13 season, he earned National Player of the Year and led the 2012–13 Wolverines to the championship game of the 2013 NCAA Division I men's basketball tournament. Shortly after the tournament he declared his eligibility for the draft.

As a freshman at Michigan, he earned the 2011–12 Big Ten Co-Freshman of the Year award and was named to the 2011–12 All-Big Ten 2nd team. He led the 2011–12 team in points, assists, steals and blocked shots. As a sophomore, Burke was a consensus first team 2013 NCAA Men's Basketball All-American. He also earned Big Ten Conference Men's Basketball Player of the Year in 2013 and was a unanimous 2012–13 All-Big Ten 1st team selection. He also earned almost all the possible National Player of the Year awards (Wooden, AP, NABC, Naismith, Robertson and Sports Illustrated), as well as the Bob Cousy Award. As a sophomore, he led the Big Ten in assists and set the Michigan single-season assists record.

Burke was drafted by the Minnesota Timberwolves with the ninth overall pick in the 2013 NBA draft and immediately traded to the Utah Jazz. As a rookie, he finished third in the NBA Rookie of the Year Award voting. After three seasons with the Jazz, Burke was traded to the Washington Wizards in July 2016. After a short stint with the Westchester Knicks of the NBA G League, he joined the New York Knicks in January 2018. In January 2019, Burke was traded to the Dallas Mavericks. In July of the same year, he signed with the Philadelphia 76ers. Burke rejoined the Mavericks in July 2020.

== Early life ==
Burke is the son of Ronda and Alfonso Clark "Benji" Burke ll. He has an older sister, Amber, and a younger sister, Amani. His parents met while Benji attended Northwest Missouri State University, where he played Division II basketball after spending time at Northeastern Oklahoma A&M College. His mother had just completed her tenure at Ruskin High School.

By the age of five, Burke's local youth basketball league had to change its rules so that he would not keep stealing the ball from the other team. As a result of his prowess, he was not allowed over half court when the other team had the ball. He became Jared Sullinger's best friend in fourth grade, but when his mother was transferred to Atlanta in sixth grade, they were separated. The reassignment only lasted one year, however. At the age of nine, Burke's father made him do everything with his left hand, including brushing his teeth and eating dinner, in order to develop his ambidexterity.

== High school career ==
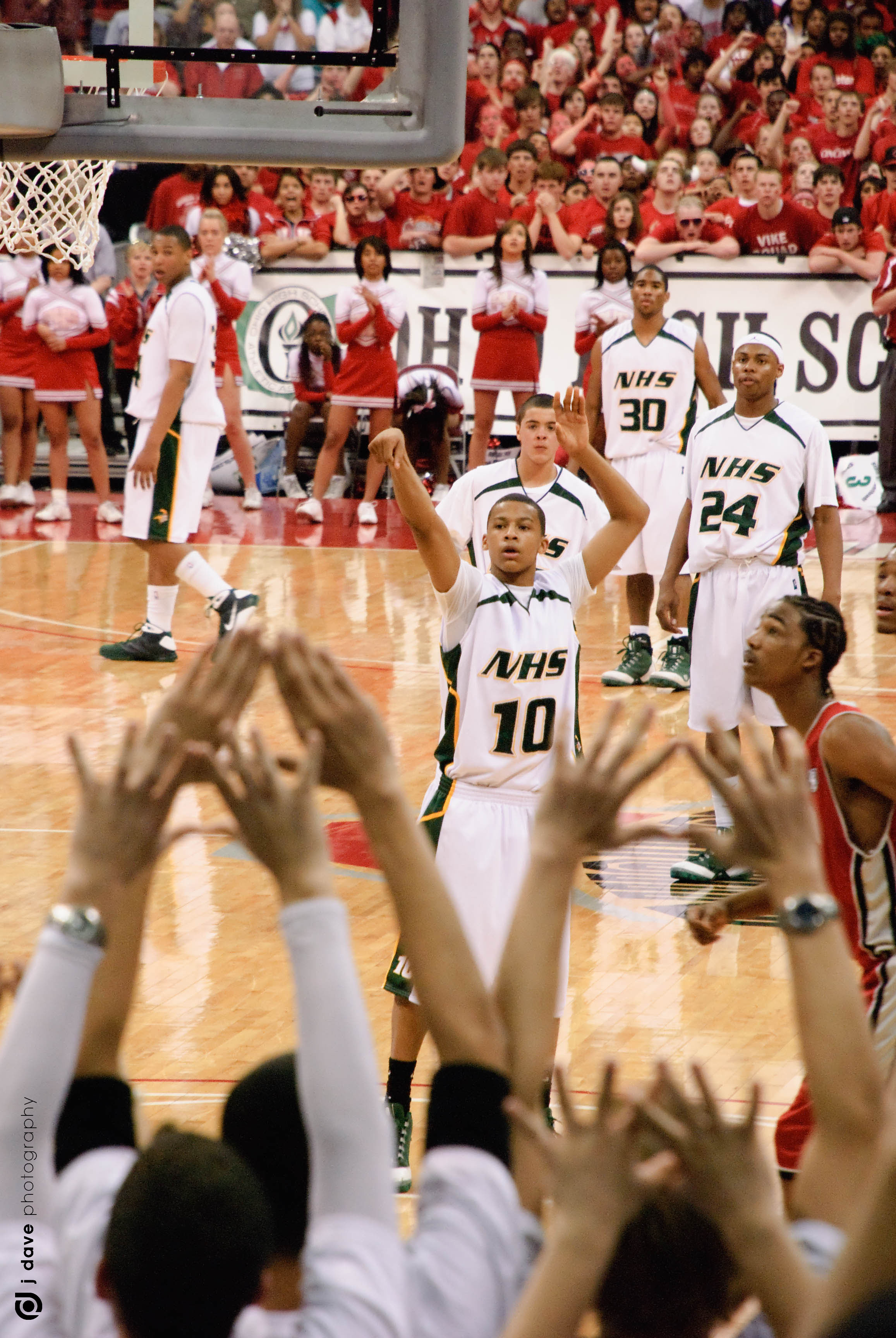
Burke shooting a free throw during the 2009 OHSAA Division I State Championship game

Satch Sullinger, father of forward Jared Sullinger, was the coach at Northland High School, while Burke's father was an assistant coach at Eastmoor Academy. Burke chose Northland because he felt he had a better chance to succeed due to their personnel. Burke gave a verbal commitment to Penn State in 2009 after receiving his first Big Ten Conference offer, but later changed his mind to Michigan.

Burke made the high school varsity team as a freshman, but did not play much. Between his freshman and second years, his summer league team was defeated when Darian Cartharn scored 35 points against them. Cartharn had been trained by Anthony Rhodman, so Burke sought his tutelage. Burke became a regular client of Rhodman's despite his hectic scholastic, training and competition schedules. He trained regularly with Cartharn twice a day. Because he was a year younger, he was unable to compete with Sullinger in AAU competition, and Sullinger became an AAU teammate of point guard Aaron Craft. By the end of the summer Burke got his first scholarship offer, from Akron. The AAU duo of Sullinger and Craft eventually committed along with two other AAU teammates to Thad Matta's Ohio State Buckeyes men's basketball team, who also signed point guard Shannon Scott.

As a sophomore, Burke made 5 of 6 free throws in overtime to help his team defeat Dublin Scioto High School by a 54–53 margin in a 2009 OHSAA Division I regional final. In the state championship game, he made one of two free throws to give Northland a 58–56 lead with 27.6 seconds left in what became a 60–58 win over Princeton High School. He also made the pass to set up the final game-winning points, although they were scored from the foul line by Sullinger. During the championship season, Burke averaged 10.7 points and 9.1 assists, and made only 1.7 turnovers per game.

In his junior season, Burke, Sulllinger and another player, J. D. Weatherspoon, were dominant. That season they defeated both of the top two 2008–09-year-end teams (Oak Hill Academy and Findlay Prep). Northland was undefeated and ranked No. 1 in the nation by ESPN HS before they fell in the 2010 OHSAA regional finals to Lincoln High School. They had also been ranked No. 1 by USA Today for several weeks, but they fell out of the top 10 with the season-ending loss. Before his senior season, Burke signed his National Letter of Intent with Michigan in the November signing period. Coming off a 23–1 season, after losing Sullinger and Weatherspoon to Ohio State, Northland entered Burke's senior season ranked No. 44 in the nation according to ESPN HS. Following a 26–2 season, the team finished No. 45 in the ESPN HS poll.

During Burke's career, Northland was 97–5, including 57– 0 in City League games. Burke was a 2009 OHSAA Division I State Champion, a Parade All-American (2011, second team) and 2011 Associated Press Ohio Mr. Basketball. He was ranked as the 15th, 20th and 26th best high school point guard in the class of 2011 by ESPN.com, Scout.com and Rivals.com, respectively.

Most elite level high school basketball players participate in the summer Amateur Athletic Union circuit as a complement to scholastic competition. Burke played in the Amateur Athletic Union (AAU) national competitions with All-Ohio Red, coached by Benji Burke, his father. The team won the AAU U16 National Title in 2009 and finished as runner-up in the 2008 AAU U15 National tournament.

College recruiting
Name	Hometown	School	Height	Weight	Commit date
Trey Burke; PG	Columbus, Ohio	Northland	6 ft 1 in (1.85 m)	170 lb (77 kg)	Aug 24, 2010
Trey Burke; PG	Recruit ratings: Scout: Rivals: 247Sports: (93)				
Overall recruit ranking: Scout: 20 (PG) Rivals: 142, 26 (PG) 247Sports: 104, 19 (PG), 2 (OH) ESPN: 84, 15 (PG), 3 (OH)
Note: In many cases, Scout, Rivals, 247Sports, On3, and ESPN may conflict in their listings of height and weight.; In these cases, the average was taken. ESPN grades are on a 100-point scale.; Sources: "Michigan 2011 Basketball Commitments". Rivals.; "2011 Michigan Basketball Commits". Scout.; "ESPN". ESPN.; "Scout.com Team Recruiting Rankings". Scout.; "2011 Team Ranking". Rivals.

== College career ==
The 2010–11 Michigan Wolverines team lost 2010–11 Big Ten Conference men's basketball season assist leader, point guard Darius Morris, to the Los Angeles Lakers in the 2011 NBA draft. This left Michigan with a vacant starting point guard position. Burke enrolled at Michigan weighing 172 pounds (78.0 kg).

=== First year ===
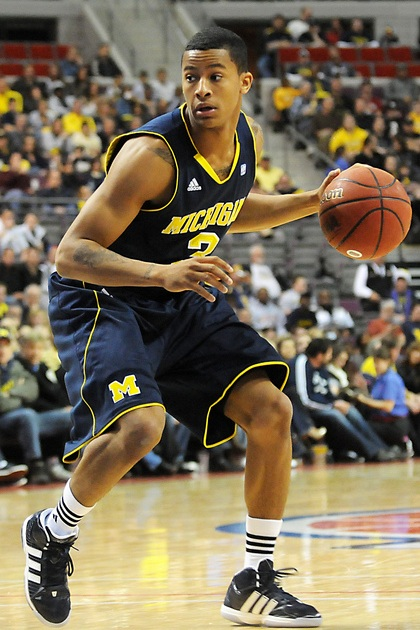
Burke led the team in points, assists, steals and blocks. (2011-12-10)

Burke debuted in the season opener for the 2011–12 Wolverines against Ferris State on November 11 with 3 points in 18 minutes, but did not start until the second game against Towson on November 14 when he tallied 13 points, 2 rebounds, 2 assists and 2 steals. In the 3-game November 21–23 2011 Maui Invitational Tournament, the team defeated the No. 8 Memphis Tigers 73–61, lost to the No. 6 Duke Blue Devils 82–75, and defeated the 2011–12 Pac-12 season favorite UCLA Bruins 79–63, which helped the team finish in third place. Burke's 9 assists against Duke would hold as a season high. Burke was named Big Ten Freshman of the Week for his 36 points and 18 assists during the tournament on November 28. On December 10, 2011, Michigan defeated Oakland by a 90–80 margin. It was the highest point production by Michigan since beating Northern Michigan 97–50 on November 14, 2009, and it was Michigan's first game with three 20-point scorers (Tim Hardaway Jr., Burke and Evan Smotrycz) since December 11, 2002, when they played Bowling Green. For his season-high 20 points and season-high 9 assists, Burke earned his second Freshman of the Week honor on December 12. On December 29, against Penn State he posted 13 points, seven assists without a turnover and five rebounds, while on January 1, 2012, he added a career-high 27 points on 8-for-11 shooting with three rebounds and three assists against Minnesota to earn the conference recognition the following day. On January 2, Burke earned his first Big Ten Conference Player of the Week honor and his third Freshman of the Week recognition for his 40-point week in Michigan's two conference openers. He earned his fourth Freshman of the Week recognition on January 23 for his performances against Michigan State and Arkansas. On February 20, he earned his fifth Big Ten Freshman of the Week award for leading the team to its third victory over a top 10 team with 17 points and 5 assists against Ohio State. A week later, he earned his sixth Freshman of the Week award for his performances against Northwestern and Purdue. On March 1, Michigan won at Illinois for the first time since 1995. During the game (Michigan's 30th of the season), Burke broke Gary Grant's school freshman assists record set over the course of 30 games for the 1984–85 Michigan Wolverines men's basketball team by pushing his total to 143 on that night. On March 5 he earned his third consecutive and seventh overall Freshman of the Week honor when he averaged 20 points, 3 rebounds and 3 assists in road wins against Illinois and Penn State that clinched a share of the 2011–12 Big Ten Conference regular season championship.

Burke led all Big Ten freshman in scoring (edging Cody Zeller by a 15.8–15.5 margin or 5 points over the 18-game conference season) and assists per conference game. He concluded the season as the team leader in points, assists, blocks (not blocks per game) and steals. His three consecutive Big Ten Player of the Week awards to conclude the season coincided with the team winning 6 of its final 7 regular-season games. His efforts lead the team to a share of its first Big Ten Conference Championship since the 1985–86 team and the best Big Ten record (13–5) since the 1993–94 team.

==== Watchlists and honors ====
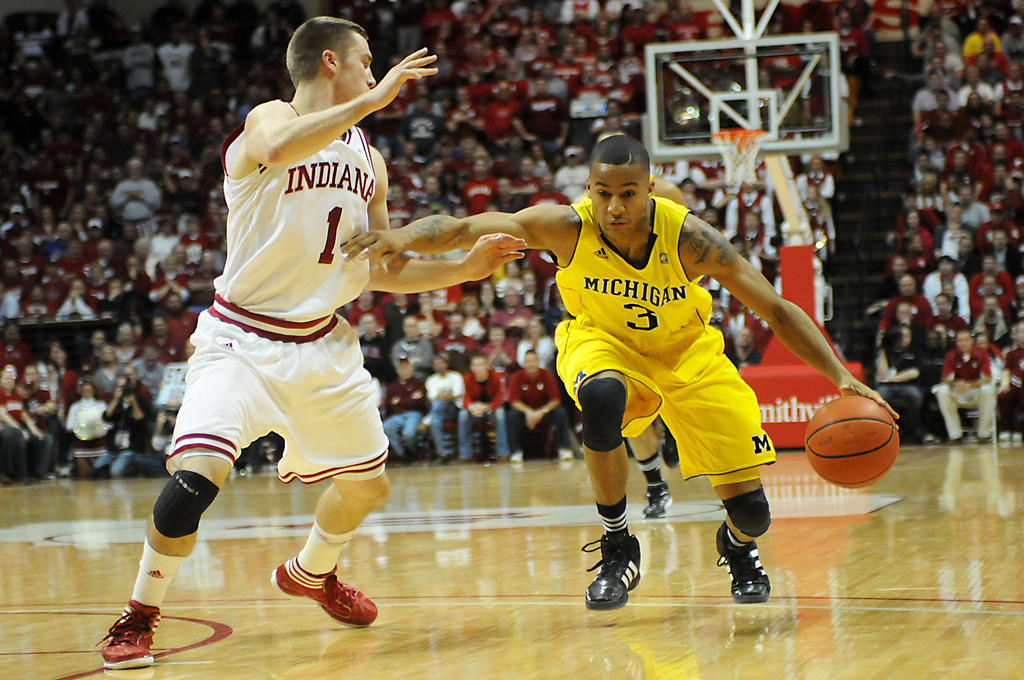
Burke drives against Jordan Hulls of Indiana on January 5, 2012

In December 2011, he was named one of nearly 60 candidates for the Bob Cousy Award, which recognizes the Collegiate Point Guard of the Year. On January 4, Burke was named as one of the twenty Cousy Award Finalists along with fellow Big Ten point guards Aaron Craft and Jordan Taylor.

He earned the 2011–12 Big Ten Freshman of the Year award from the Big Ten media (Cody Zeller earned the Big Ten coaches' award) and was named to the 2011–12 All-Big Ten 2nd team by the coaches and media as well as named unanimously to the 2011–12 Big Ten All-Freshman team. Burke and Zeller were named Co-Big Ten Freshmen of the Year by the Sporting News. He was selected by the U.S. Basketball Writers Association to its 10-man 2011–12 Men's All-District V (OH, IN, IL, MI, MN, WI) Team. Burke was a second team selection to the National Association of Basketball Coaches Division I All‐District 7 team on March 14. CBSSports.com used a modified selection process that resulted in Burke being named a second team All-American and a first team Freshman All-American. The process derided the traditional basketball All-American process of naming the best players and was modelled on the All-Pro or NHL All-Star team formula of choosing the best players by position. Burke was named an honorable mention Associated Press All-American. Burke became Michigan's first Associated Press All-American honoree since Robert Traylor and Louis Bullock in 1998. He became the eighth Michigan freshman to earn team MVP.

==== Postseason ====
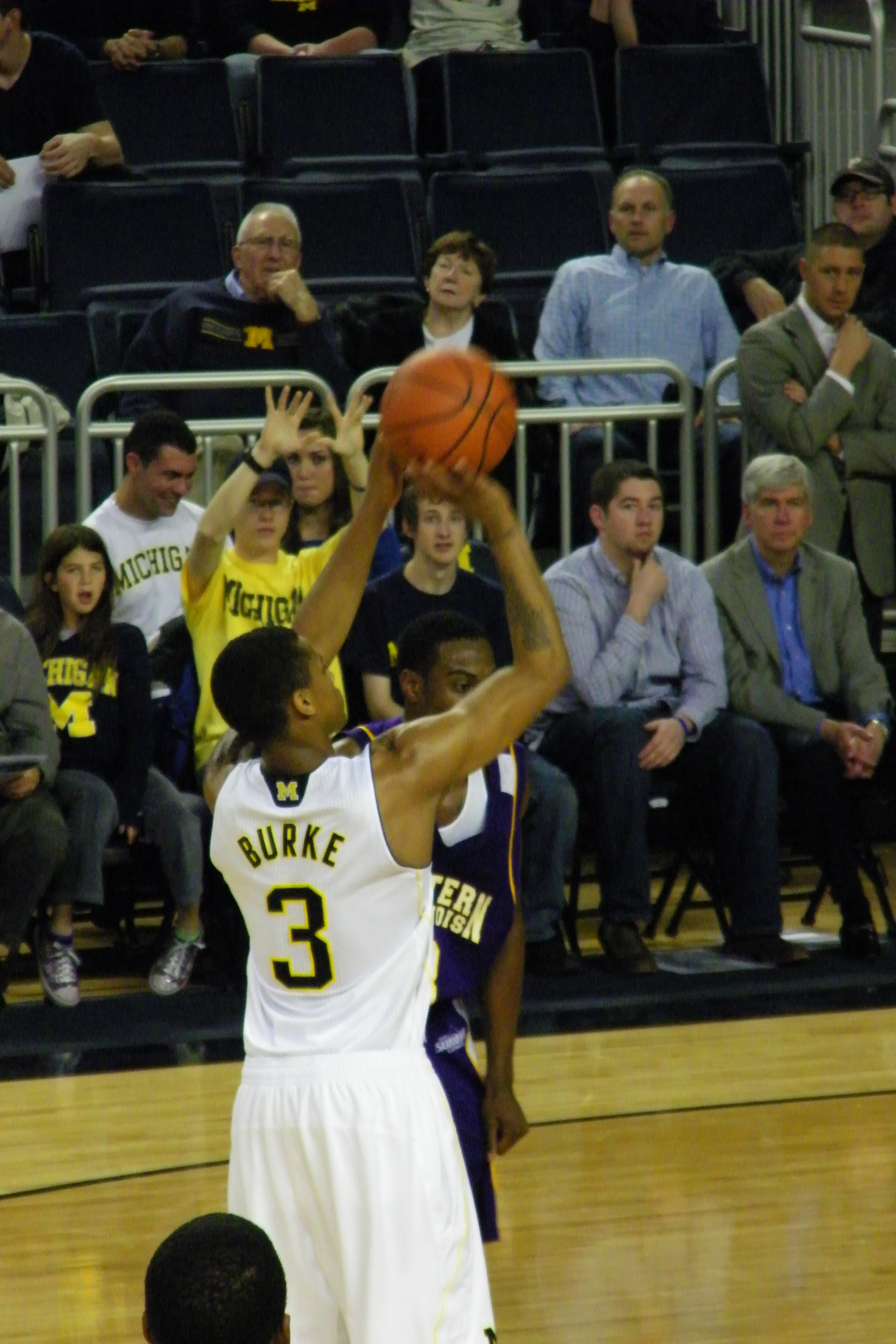
Burke shooting a free throw for the 2011–12 Michigan Wolverines men's basketball team (2011-11-17)

In the first game of the 2012 Big Ten Conference men's basketball tournament against Minnesota, Burke set a new career high with 30 points, which established a school record for the Big Ten Conference men's basketball tournament. The overtime game marked Burke's third 45-minute appearance. Burke finished with 156 assists, and his single-season total of 1,227 minutes ranked second in school history. Burke's freshman season came to an end when the Wolverine lost to Ohio in their first game in the 2012 NCAA basketball tournament.

==== 2012 NBA draft ====
Immediately after the season ended, Burke said he was uninterested in declaring for the 2012 NBA draft. After the season, Burke was recognized as one of the best point guards in the nation by CBSSports.com. He was named a second-team All-American by the website based on the premise that every team needed a "dribbler". A few days later, however, the realization that the pool of point guards in the 2012 draft was shallow and Burke's stock was high led to some deliberation for him and his family: "When you have a season as a freshman like he did, the NBA, they like them young", Trey's father, Benji Burke said. "They think their ceiling is higher when they're young. Trey had ... a solid season for a freshman. It's going to be one of the weaker point guard drafts in years." On March 21, Burke submitted himself for evaluation by the NBA Draft Advisory Council, which had encouraged Michigan's DeShawn Sims and Manny Harris to return to school in 2009 but advised Harris in 2010 and Darius Morris in 2011 to declare for the draft. The deadline for entering the NBA draft was April 29, but the deadline for withdrawing a declaration and retaining NCAA eligibility was April 10. The deadline for submitting information to the NBA Advisory Committee for a 72-hour response was April 3. As Burke weighed his decision, he became involved in a controversy when the Michigan State Spartans athletic director Mark Hollis communicated with him directly via Twitter. Experts doubted his readiness for the draft, noting that notable NBA draft successes who were between 5-foot-10-inch (1.78 m) and 5-foot-11-inch (1.80 m) over the past 30 years (Terrell Brandon, Dana Barros, Brevin Knight, Damon Stoudamire, Mark Price and Michael Adams) waited past their first years to enter the draft. Nonetheless, CBS Sports reported on April 4 that Burke would declare for the draft. Burke's early departure for the NBA would have been the third in a row for a Michigan guard after Manny Harris in 2010 and Darius Morris in 2011. It would also have been the sixth scholarship-player departure from the team after two players graduated and three transferred. On April 9, Burke announced he would return to Michigan for his sophomore season instead of staying in the NBA draft. He decided to wait in hopes of becoming a more likely first round selection. During the summer, he spent 5–6-hour days with his trainer in Ohio.

=== Second year ===
One year after enrolling, Burke had improved his vertical jump 4 inches (10.2 cm). Entering his sophomore season, he was selected as a third team preseason All-American by Sporting News. CBS Sports listed him as a second team preseason All-American and the 9th best player in its preseason top 100. CBS also named him the third best point guard (behind Isaiah Canaan and Phil Pressey). ESPN and Sports Illustrated also named him to their preseason All-American second teams. 16 of the 65 Associated Press selectors named Burke to their first team preseason All-American team, which tied him for the fifth spot on the 6-man AP preseason All-American team. The Big Ten conference media selected him as a preseason All-Big Ten selection. Burke was both a preseason John R. Wooden Award top 50 selection and a preseason Naismith Award top 50 selection. Burke was suspended for the exhibition opener for "violation of team standards."

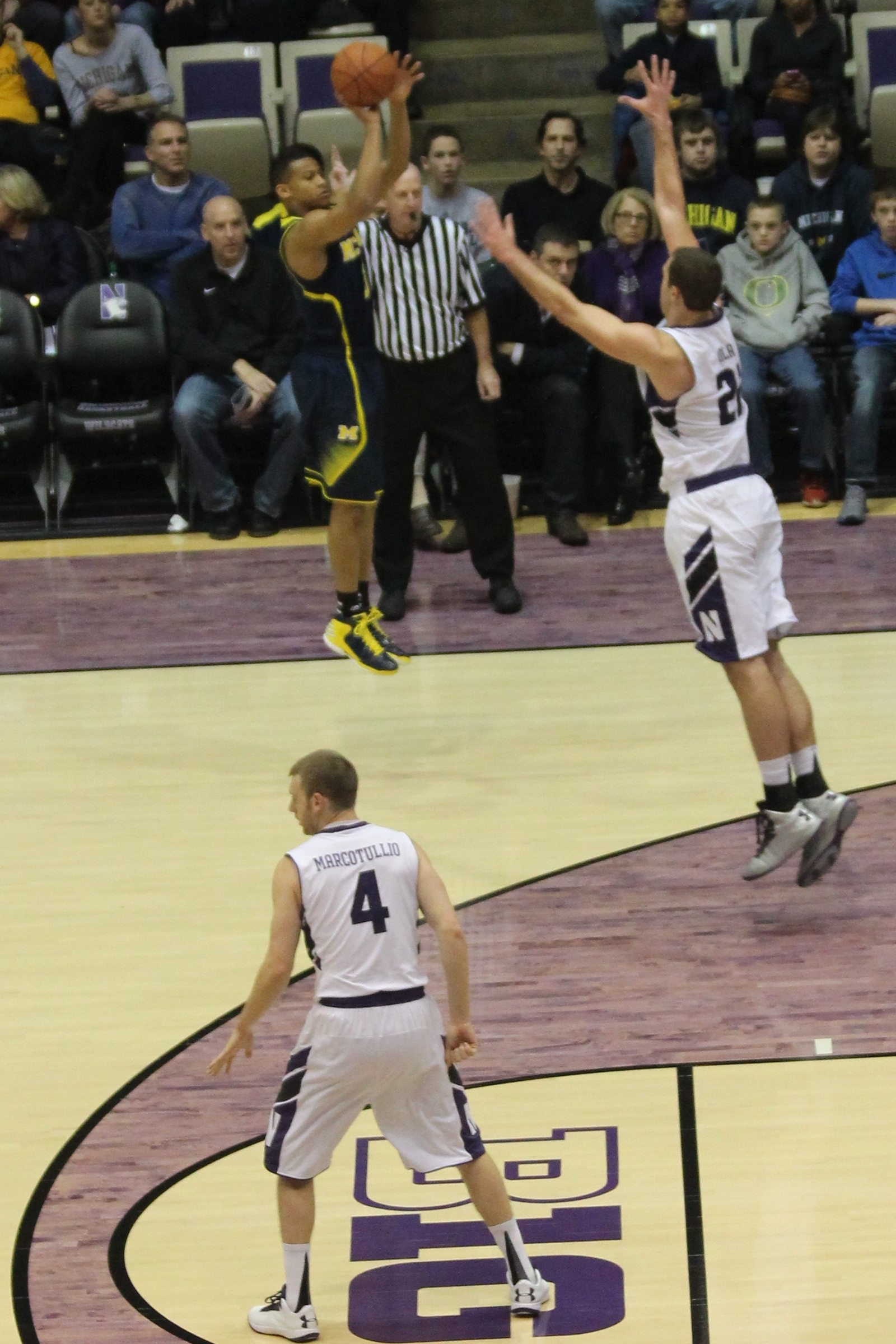
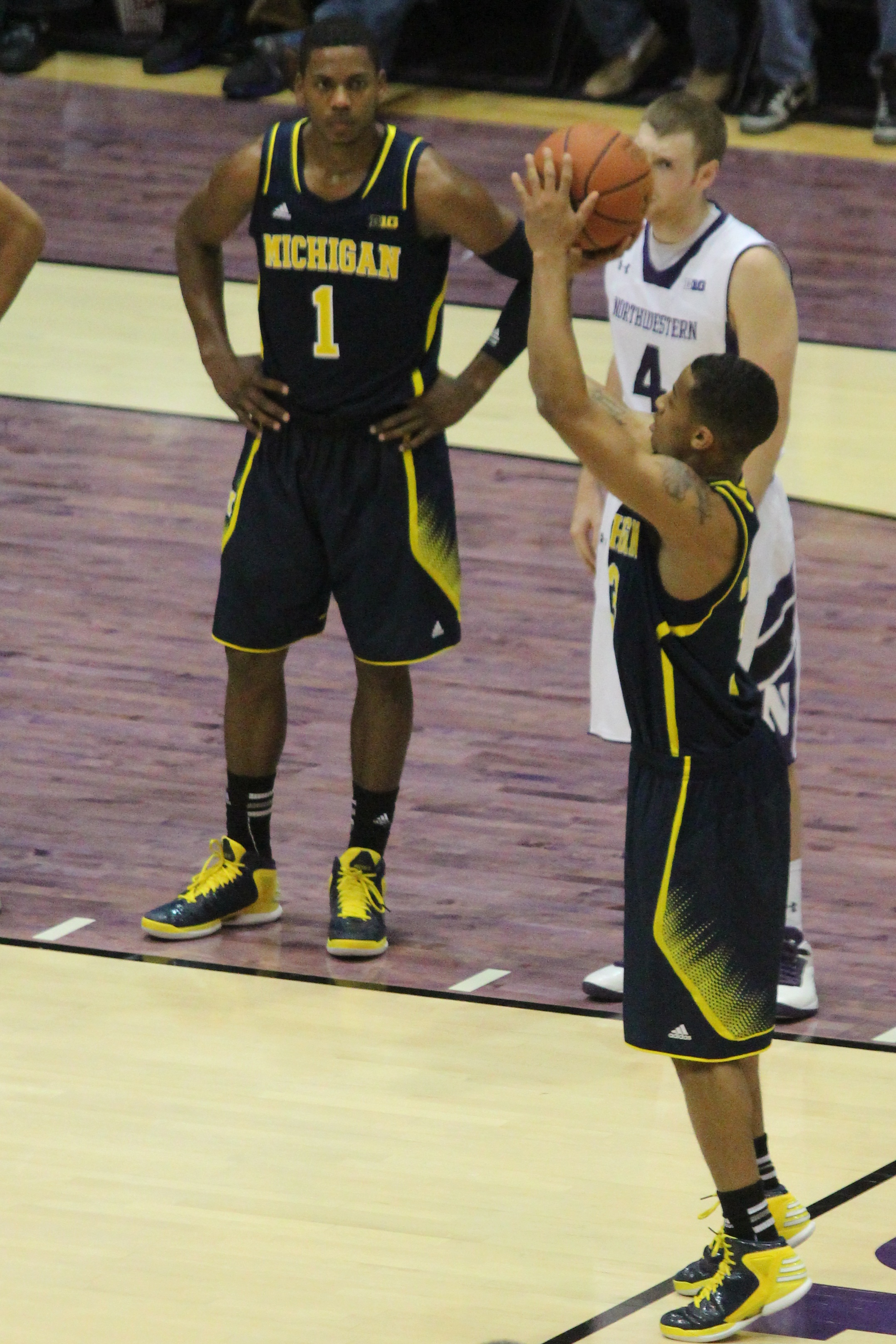
Burke shooting a three-point field goal (left) and a free throw (right) on January 3, 2013.

In his second game of the season, Burke tied his career-high with 9 assists in a November 12, 91–54 victory against the IUPUI Jaguars. Burke earned the NIT Season Tip-Off tournament team recognition with 27 points and 10 assists total in the November 21 semi-final and November 23 final against Pittsburgh and Kansas State, respectively. On November 27, Burke posted a career-high 11 assists, no turnovers and his first career double-double with 18 points in a 79–72 victory against number 18 NC State in the ACC–Big Ten Challenge. For averaging 23.0 points, 6.5 assists, 4.5 rebounds and 2.0 steals with only 1 turnover in the games against Binghamton on December 11 and West Virginia on December 15, Burke earned Big Ten Player of the Week on December 17. On December 29 against Central Michigan, Burke posted his second career double-double with 22 points and a career-high tying 11 assists with only 1 turnover. In the subsequent game on January 3, he posted a game-high 23 points and a career-high 4 steals in a 94–66 victory in the 2012–13 Big Ten Conference men's basketball season opener against Northwestern. On January 6, Burke posted 19 points and a new career-high 12 assists against Iowa, to earn his third career double-double. On January 7, Burke was again recognized as Big Ten Conference Player of the Week. The following day, he earned the Oscar Robertson National Players of the Week from the United States Basketball Writers Association. On January 13, the team lost to Ohio State (#15 AP/#14 Coaches) snapping their winning streak. Burke missed a three-point shot with 17 seconds remaining that would have given Michigan a one-point lead. Michigan had been the only remaining unbeaten team and was expected to be ranked No. 1 if they had won.

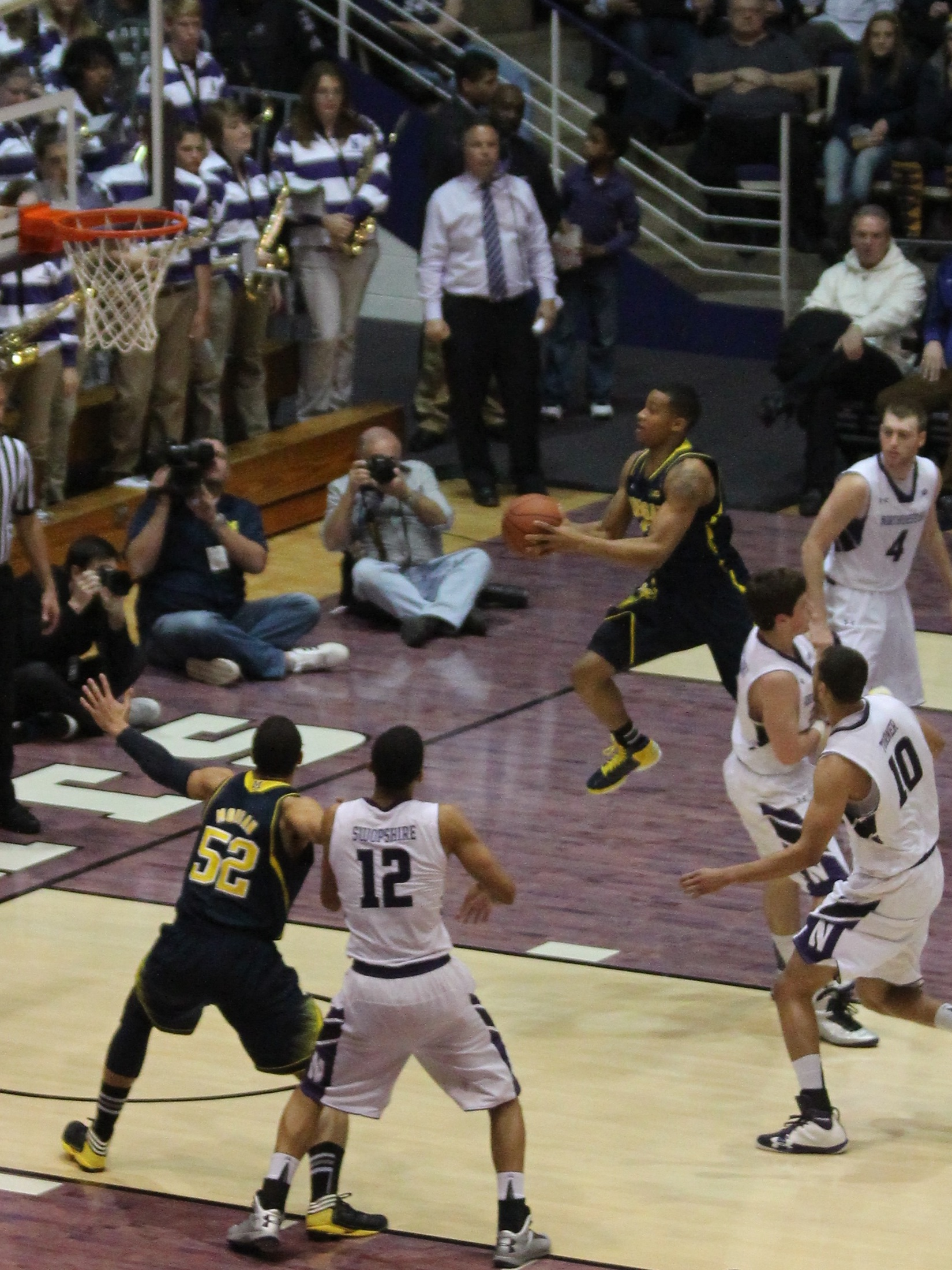
Burke penetrating to attempt a layup for the 2012–13 Michigan Wolverines in the January 3 2012–13 Big Ten Conference season opener against Northwestern at Welsh-Ryan Arena

On January 28, Michigan was ranked number one in the AP Poll with 51 of the 65 first place votes. It marked the first time Michigan ranked atop the AP Poll since the Fab Five 1992–93 team did so on December 5, 1992. Burke ended January as the only Big Ten player to have scored 15 points in each conference game. On February 12 in the rivalry game against (#8 AP/#8 Coaches) Michigan State, Burke's 18 points, 4 assists and 3 steals were one of Michigan's few bright spots in a 23-point loss. On February 17 against Penn State, Burke posted a season-high 29 points along with 5 assists, 3 rebounds and two steals. As a result of his efforts, Burke won his third player of the week award on February 18. On February 24, Michigan defeated Illinois 71–58 behind 26 points and 8 assists from Burke. In the game, Burke became the seventh Wolverine sophomore to reach 1000 career points. On March 3, in the Ann Arbor version of the Michigan–Michigan State rivalry game, Burke had a career-high five steals, including 2 in the final 30 seconds of play, to go along with 21 points and 8 assists to key a 58–57 victory. On the March 10 regular season finale against No. 2 ranked Indiana with a share of the Big Ten regular season title at stake, Burke missed a last second shot at the rim, that was contested by Cody Zeller. Burke finished the 18-game 2012–13 Big Ten Conference men's basketball season schedule as the conference games leader in both scoring average and assist average and finished second in steals per game. He was Michigan's first conference games scoring leader since Glen Rice in 1989 and Michigan's first conference games assist leader since Gary Grant in 1988. Burke was the only player to score 15 points in all 18 conference games.

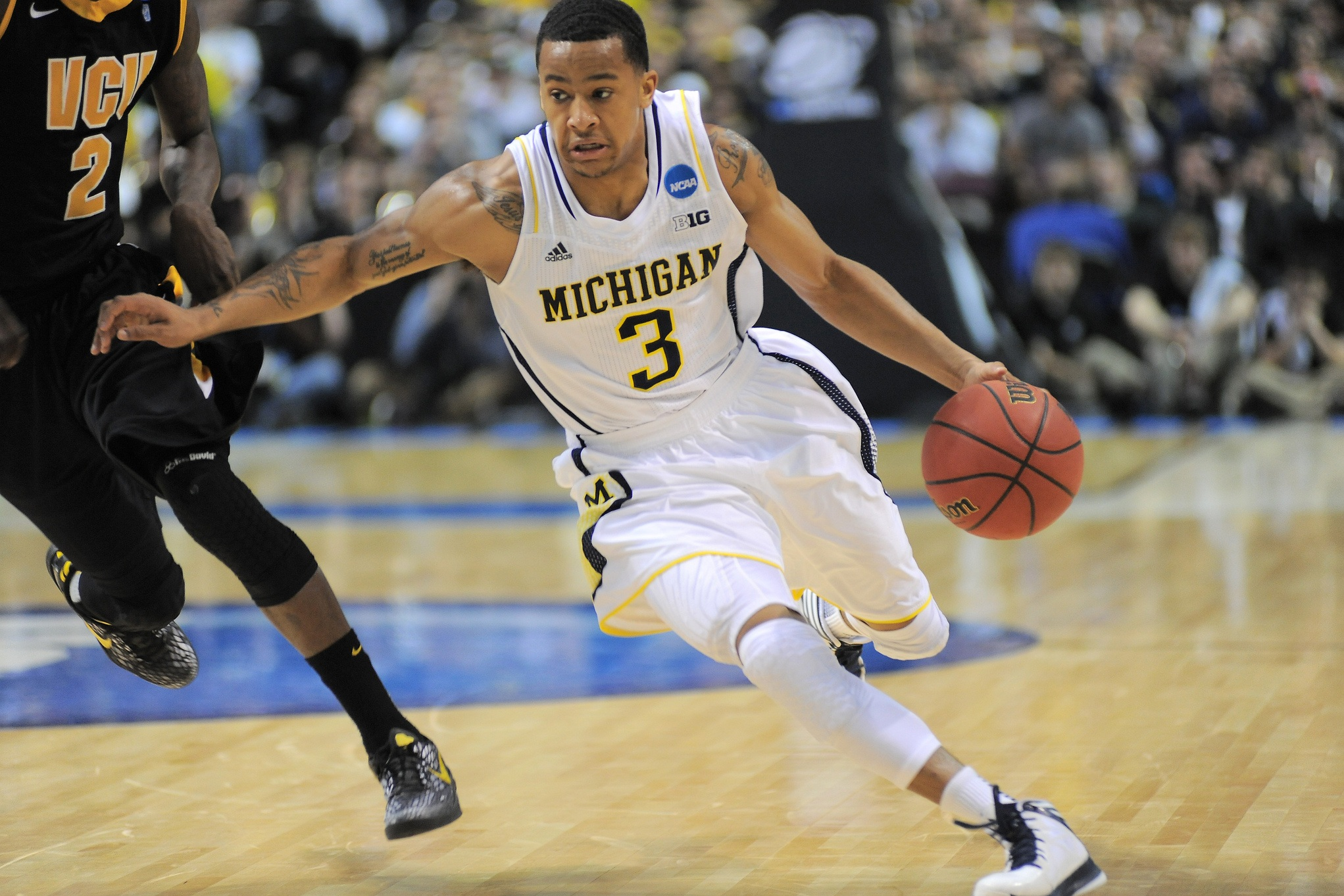
Burke during the 2013 NCAA Division I men's basketball tournament

Prior to the 2013 NCAA Division I men's basketball tournament, Jeff Goodman of CBSSports.com named Michigan with Burke first among tournament teams in terms of having the most future NBA talent on its roster (in the absence of Kentucky who was relegated to the 2013 National Invitation Tournament). On March 23, in the team's second game of the 2013 Tournament, in a 78–53 victory against VCU Burke tallied 7 assists, giving him a single-season total of 236 and surpassing Darius Morris as the school's single season record holder.

2013 NCAA Division I men's basketball tournament

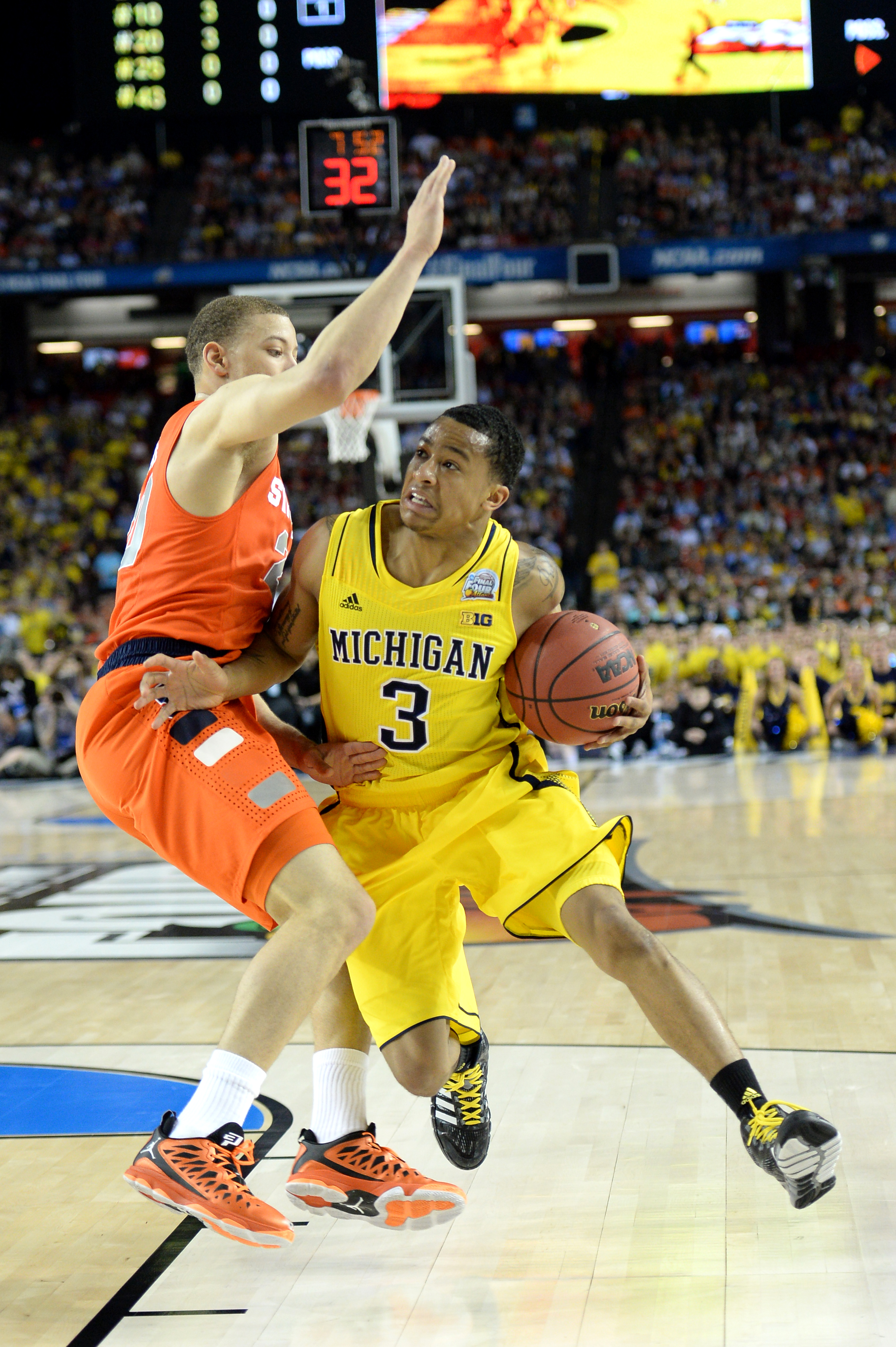
Burke being defended by Brandon Triche

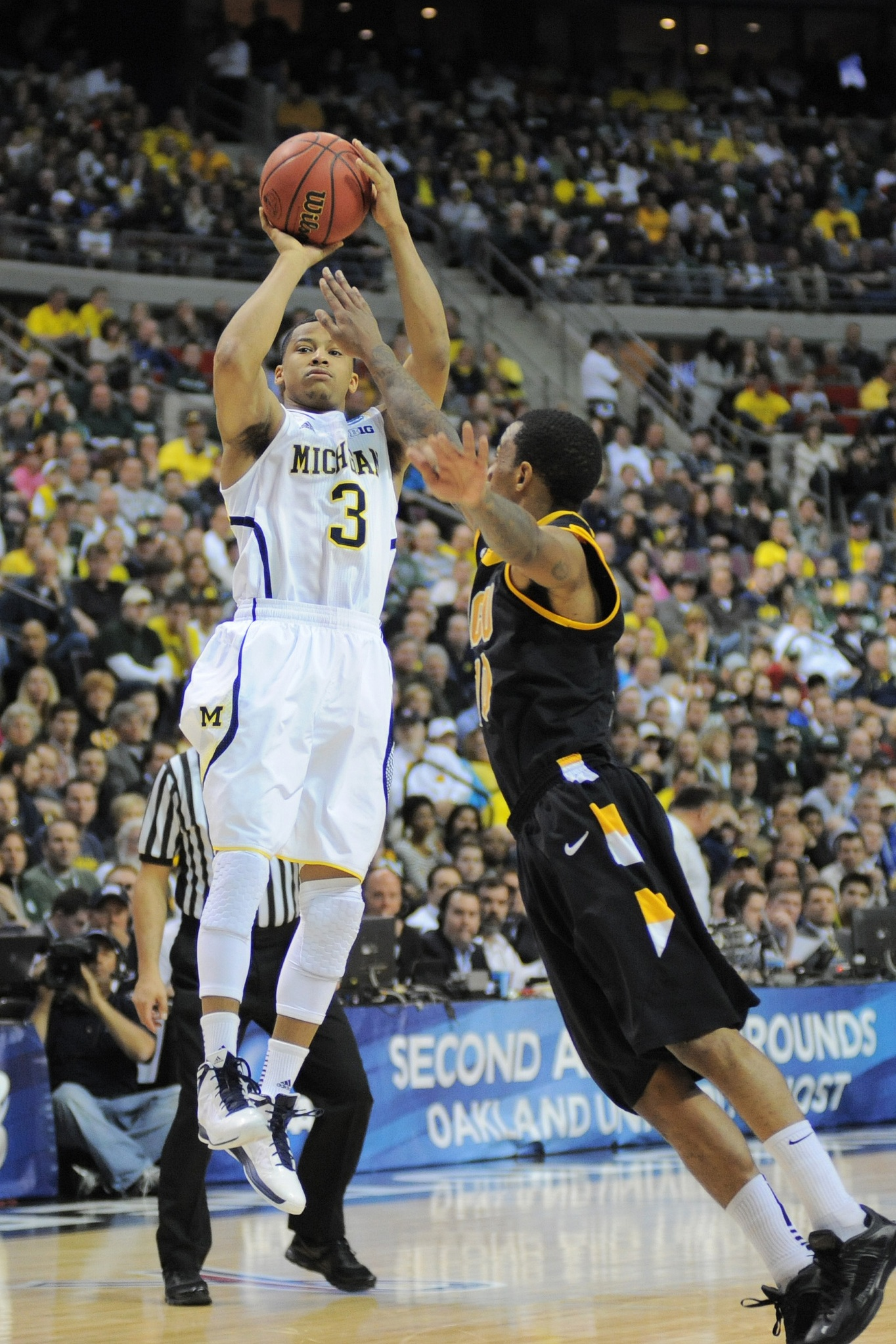
Burke against VCU

On March 29 against Kansas, Burke recorded his fourth career double-double, with 23 points and 10 assists. He scored all 23 points in the second half and overtime, including a game-tying deep three-pointer with 4.2 seconds remaining. Burke describes the 28-foot (8.5 m) shot as "...probably the biggest shot I ever made and definitely a shot I'll always remember." He also scored a layup with his team trailing by 5 points with 21 seconds remaining. Burke scored eight points in the final 1:15 of regulation time, as Michigan posted a 14–4 run in the final 2:52 to force overtime. He also gave the team its first lead since very early in the game in overtime with a three-point shot. It marked the first time that a player had 20 or more points and 10 or more assists in a Sweet Sixteen game since Billy Donovan did so in the 1986 tournament for Rick Pitino's Providence Friars. In the regional finals on March 31 against the Donovan-coached Florida Gators, Burke contributed 15 points, 7 assists, 3 steals and a career-high 8 rebounds. Burke was named South Regional Tournament Most Outstanding Player. He was joined on the 5-man South All-Regional team by teammates Mitch McGary and Nik Stauskas. Burke also earned ESPN.com Player of the Week recognition. Although Burke admits that the team he led, with three starting freshman and no seniors, was young, he said that was no excuse pointing at the 2012 tournament champions, Kentucky, saying "You saw what Kentucky did last year. We felt that being young isn't an excuse for not going far in the tournament." Burke scored 24 points in the April 8, championship game against Louisville and made the 7-man All-Tournament team (which was revised multiple times) along with teammates McGary and Albrecht. The turning point of the game was when Louisville Junior Luke Hancock hit four consecutive three-pointers to rally the Cardinals back from 12 down in the first half while Burke was on the bench after 2 quick fouls that led to Spike Albrecht leading the Wolverines to an early big lead. Michigan fans often point to a later moment having to do with the loss that is described as a missed call by the referees when as Michigan trailed 67–64 with 5 minutes left, Burke appeared to pin Peyton Siva's dunk attempt against the backboard and was called for a foul resulting in two made free throws by Siva. Michigan never got closer than 4 points the rest of the game. Burke finished his sophomore season with 1,231 points, surpassing the former school record for sophomore season career point total of 1,218 by Chris Webber. His final total of 260 assists established the Michigan career record, and his average of 6.7 assists per game led the Big Ten.

==== Watchlists ====
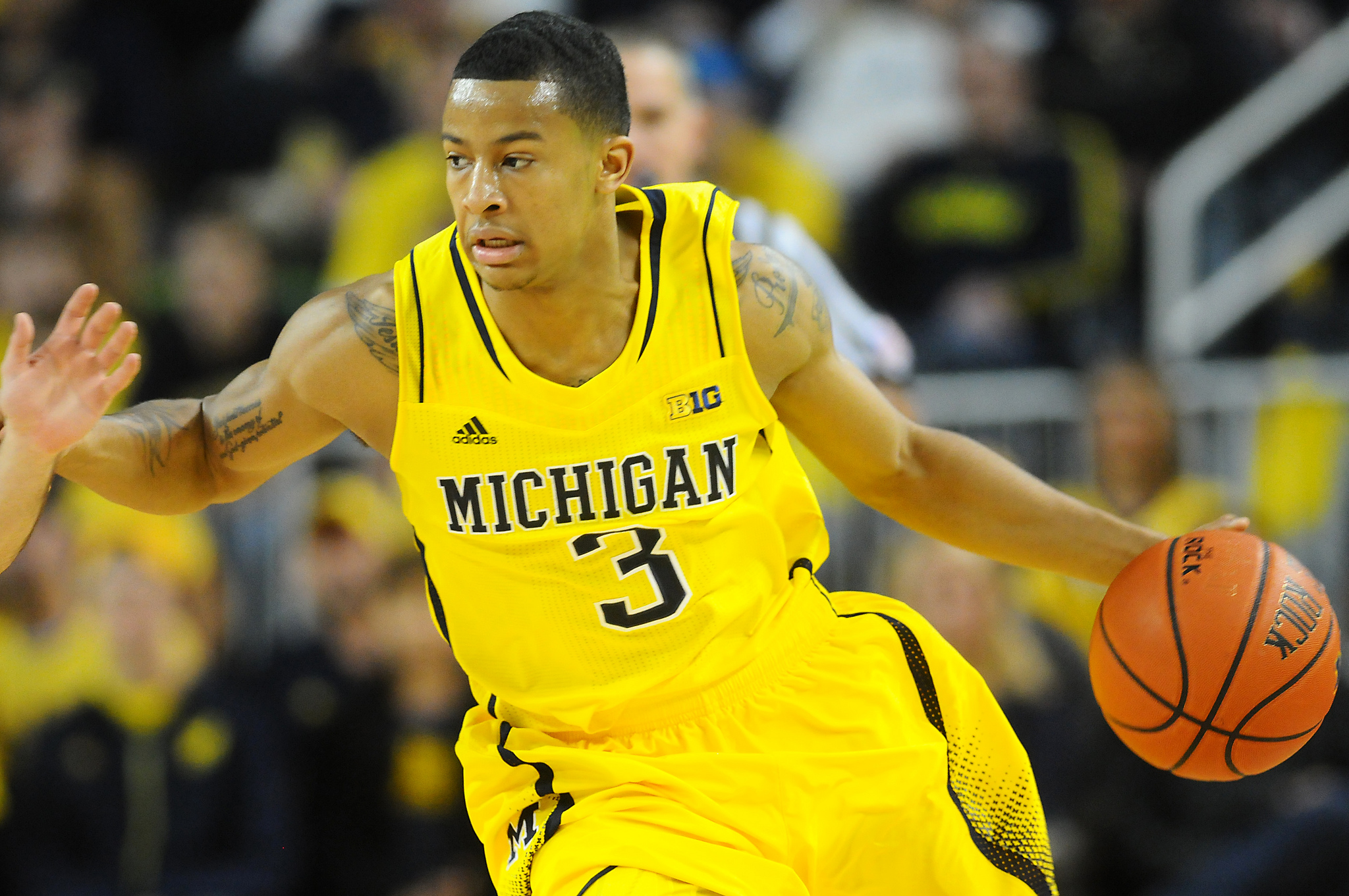
Trey Burke playing for the Michigan Wolverines

Burke was one of 85 2013 Cousy Award watch list candidates on December 20, 2012. On January 9, he was one of 4 Big Ten points guards among the 20 Cousy Award finalists. On January 10, the Wooden Award midseason top 25 list, which included Burke, was announced. On January 31, Burke was named to the Oscar Robertson Trophy midseason top 12 list. On February 26, Burke was one of six Big Ten players named among the top 30 finalists for the Naismith Award. Burke was among four Big Ten Players on the March 4, 14-man Robertson watchlist. On March 9, Burke was among four Big Ten Players named as top 15 Wooden Award finalists. On March 11, Burke was named one of five finalists for the Cousy Award. On March 24, Burke was named one of four finalists for the Naismith Award.

In addition to official watchlists, the press ranked Burke atop several midseason National Player of the Year tabulations. For example, in mid-January, The Sporting News called him the Player of the half-year. On both February 7, February 21 and March 7, ESPN.com posted straw polls of people who are an "actual voter for at least one of the Wooden, Naismith, Associated Press or Robertson awards" that had Burke in first place. Since the NCAA tournament had gone to a seeded format in 1985, no point guard had won any of the four major player of the year awards without leading his team to a No. 1 seed. However, neither Jay Williams (2002, Sweet 16) nor Jameer Nelson (2004, Elite 8) reached the championships as national player of the year and only a few players at any position had done so in the previous 20 years: Ed O'Bannon (UCLA, 1995), Shane Battier (Duke, 2001) and Anthony Davis (Kentucky 2012).

During the season, Burke and Hardaway were constantly referred to as the best backcourt in college basketball. The praise came from a variety of leading media outlets such as FOX Sports, ESPN color commentator Dick Vitale, ESPN journalists such as Miles Simon, Bleacher Report columnist Zach Dirlam (who included backcourt depth provided by Nik Stauskas), as well as much local press. Following the schoolyear, Burke was one of 10 finalist for the Sports Illustrated College Athlete of the Year.

Burke stated on March 27 that he would almost certainly enter the draft if Michigan won the national title. On April 9 before boarding the airplane to return from the NCAA Final Four, head coach Beilein met with Burke, Hardaway, Robinson and McGary to direct them to seek the advice of the NBA advisory committee. The draft board had until April 15 to develop each individual report and the players have until April 28 to enter the draft. On April 13, reports surfaced that Burke would announce that he would enter the NBA draft at a press conference the following day. On April 14, he entered the 2013 NBA draft. Multiple NBA analysts expected Burke to be picked first overall.

Burke's father became his agent. Burke was one of 60 players invited to the NBA Draft Combine. Burke was invited to sit in the "green room" during the 2013 NBA draft.

==== Awards and honors ====
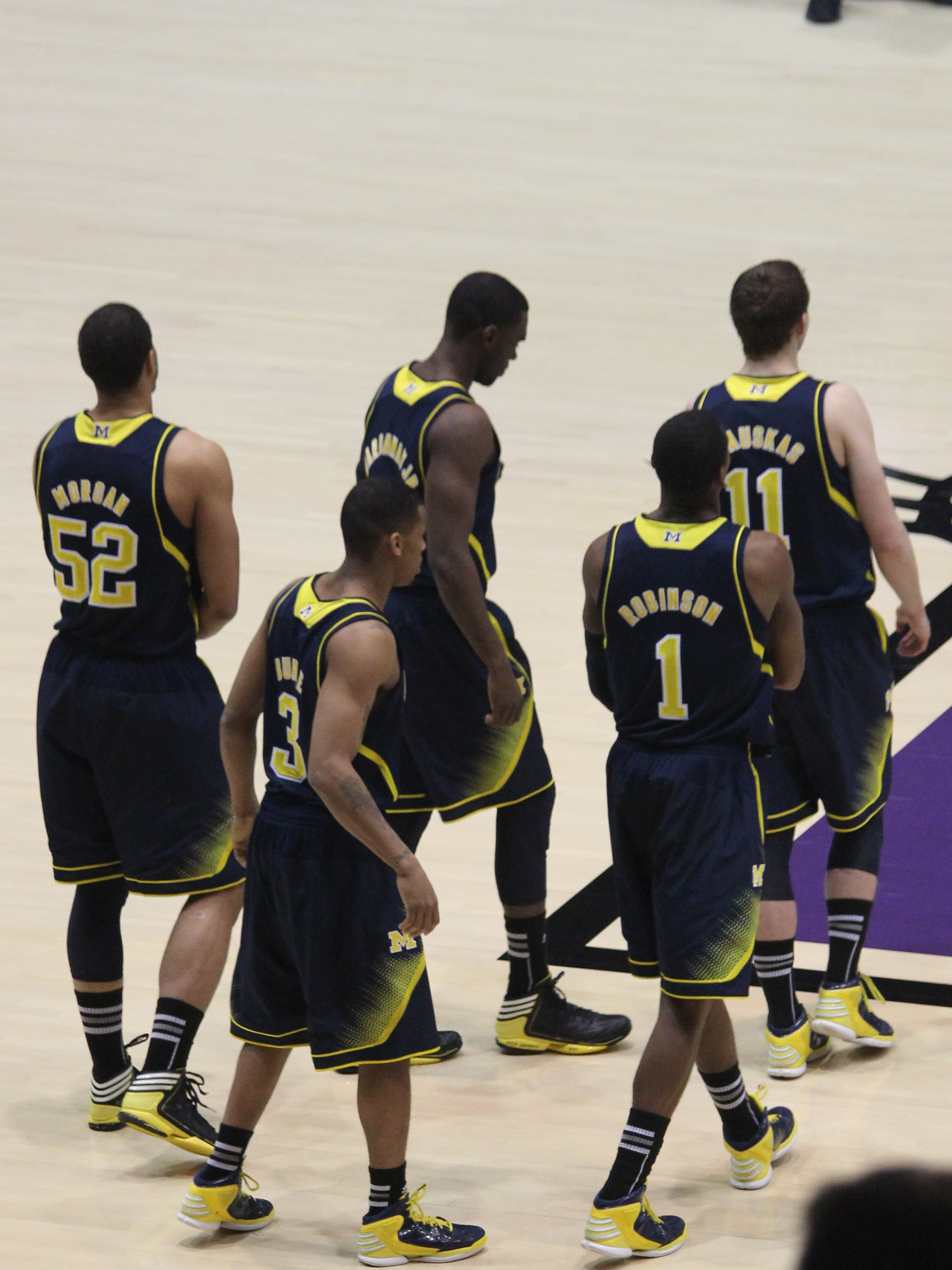
The starting five (Burke, Hardaway Jr., Morgan, Robinson III, Stauskas) in the January 3 2012–13 Big Ten Conference season opener against Northwestern at Welsh-Ryan Arena

Burke was named a first-team All-American by Sporting News on March 11. On the same day, he also earned Big Ten Conference Men's Basketball Player of the Year in 2013 and was a unanimous 2012–13 All-Big Ten 1st team selection. On March 12, the U.S. Basketball Writers Association named Burke as District V Player of the Year on its 2012–13 Men's All-District V (OH, IN, IL, MI, MN, WI) Team, based upon voting from its national membership. On March 18, the USBWA named Burke to its All-American first team. On March 19, Sports Illustrated named Burke to its All-American first team and as its National Player of the Year. On March 20 Burke was named to the CBSSports.com All-American first team. He was named to the National Association of Basketball Coaches Division I All‐District 7 first team on March 26, as selected and voted on by member coaches of the NABC, making him eligible for the State Farm Coaches’ Division I All-America team. On that same day, he was selected to the 21-man 2013 Lute Olson All-America Team. On March 28, he was named first team All-American by the NABC. On April 1, Burke was named first team All-American by the Associated Press, tying with Otto Porter for the most first-place votes and most total points. On that same day, he was one of four Big Ten players named to the 10-man Wooden All-American team of finalists for the Wooden Award. Burke became the fifth Consensus All-American (Cazzie Russell, Rickey Green, Gary Grant and Chris Webber) in school history. On April 4, Burke won the Bob Cousy Award and was named Associated Press College Basketball Player of the Year. On April 5, Burke won the Oscar Robertson Trophy from the USBWA as well as the John R. Wooden Award. On April 7, he won the NABC Player of the Year and Naismith College Player of the Year awards, giving him a sweep of the four major player of the year awards. Burke was named team MVP.

On January 23, 2026, Burke's jersey (#3) was honored and hung from the rafters at Crisler Center, becoming the sixth jersey to be honored in Michigan program history, and the first men's basketball player to receive the recognition in 20 years.

== Professional career ==
=== Utah Jazz (2013–2016) ===
==== 2013–14 season ====
On June 27, 2013, Burke was selected 9th in the 2013 NBA draft by the Minnesota Timberwolves and then traded to the Utah Jazz for the 14th and 21st picks. Burke and Hardaway Jr. became the first Michigan duo selected in the first round since Juwan Howard and Jalen Rose in the 1994 NBA draft. Burke also became the first Wolverine selection in the top 10 of the first round since Jamal Crawford in the 2000 NBA draft. In addition, Burke joined Indiana University players Victor Oladipo (2nd) and Cody Zeller (4th) to give the Big Ten its first top ten first round trio since the 1990 NBA draft.

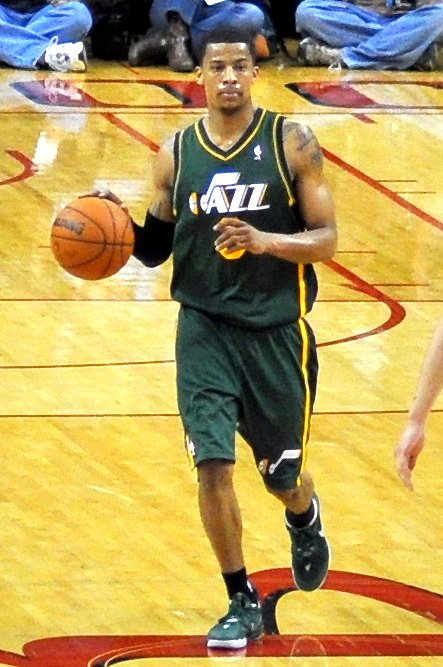
Burke playing for the Jazz in 2014

On July 6, Burke signed a maximum rookie contract with the Jazz, resulting in a contract worth $5 million for his first two seasons and team options for the next two seasons. This cleared the way for Burke to participate in the July 7–12 Orlando Summer League. In the NBA Summer League, Trey Burke shot 24 percent from the field, including 1–19 on three-point shots.

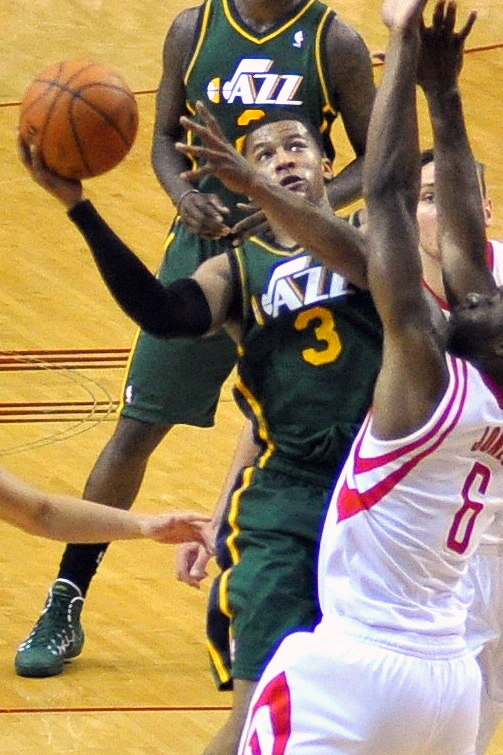
Burke with the Jazz in March 2014

On October 12, Burke broke his right index finger below the middle knuckle. He was listed as out indefinitely. On October 14, an October 15 surgery to insert surgical pins was announced. ESPN The Magazine's Chris Broussard reported a 6-week absence was expected. On November 11, Burke's finger was reevaluated. On November 12, the Jazz announced that Burke had only been cleared to begin individual drills and that he would be reevaluated November 25. Jazz head coach Tyrone Corbin reported that by November 13 Burke was dribbling a basketball pain-free. On November 20, Burke announced he would make his NBA debut against the New Orleans Pelicans, but he was not expected to start.

Burke debuted for the Jazz on November 20 with 11 points in 12 minutes of play. He started in his third game. He again played for 20 minutes, but only tallied four points and four assists. Burke experienced his first NBA win in his fourth game and second start on November 25 against the Chicago Bulls. He had 3 assists and established career highs with 14 points and 6 rebounds in 34 minutes of play. On November 30, he had his first 20-point scoring performance, leading the Jazz to their first road victory of the season against the Phoenix Suns. With career highs of 21 points and 6 assists, Burke helped the Jazz record their first back-to-back wins of the season on December 2 against the Houston Rockets. Although Burke had 7 assists on December 7 against Sacramento, he nonetheless posted his first professional double double with a game-high 10 rebounds and 19 points. On December 18 against the Orlando Magic, Burke not only scored a career-high 30 points while posting 8 assists and 7 rebounds, but he also became the first rookie to score 30 points during the 2013–14 NBA season. Burke was named Western Conference NBA Rookie of the Month for December, becoming the first rookie of the Month honoree for the Jazz franchise since Karl Malone in December 1985. On January 17 against Detroit, Burke had 20 points, a career-high 12 assists, 3 rebounds, 2 steals and a block. On January 29, he was named a Rising Stars Challenge participant as part of the 2014 NBA All-Star Game weekend. Burke led all rookies by averaging 6.8 assists in January, earning Western Conference Rookie of the Month. On February 15, Burke won the NBA All-Star Weekend Skills Challenge with partner Damian Lillard. On April 6, Burke scored 24 points and posted a career-high 15 assists against the Golden State Warriors. On April 16, he ended the season with a career-high 32 points against the Minnesota Timberwolves. Two days later, he was named Western Conference Rookie of the Month, earning his third such award. Burke finished third in the NBA Rookie of the Year Award balloting behind Carter-Williams and Oladipo. He was also a first-team NBA All-Rookie selection.

==== 2014–15 season ====
Burke committed to represent the Jazz in 2014 NBA Summer League. On July 18, he was named to practice with the USA Basketball National Select Team from July 28–31. On October 24, 2014, the Jazz exercised their third-year team option on his rookie scale contract, extending the contract through the 2015–16 season. On November 14, Burke made a buzzer beater to give Utah a 102–100 victory over the New York Knicks. On January 2, he tied Antoine Walker's NBA record for worst single-game three-point shooting performance, 0-for-11. Burke scored a season-high 28 points on January 3 against the Minnesota Timberwolves. On January 22, the Jazz announced that Burke would not start despite being healthy. With the shakeup, the 14–28 Jazz won their next two games against the Milwaukee Bucks and Brooklyn Nets. It was the first time in Burke's basketball career that he had not been a starter.

==== 2015–16 season ====
During the 2015 offseason, Burke was named as a participant in the first-ever NBA Africa Game. On October 17, 2015, the Jazz exercised their fourth-year team option on his rookie scale contract, extending the contract through the 2016–17 season. After Exum endured a torn ACL during the off-season, ruling him out of the 2015–16 season, Burke was expected to resume his role as a starter. However, Jazz coach Quin Snyder announced that Raul Neto would be starting over Burke to begin the season. On November 7, 2015, Burke scored 24 points with a career-high six three-pointers off the bench in an 89–79 win over the Memphis Grizzlies. On December 31, he scored a season-high 27 points in a 109–96 win over the Portland Trail Blazers.

=== Washington Wizards (2016–2017) ===
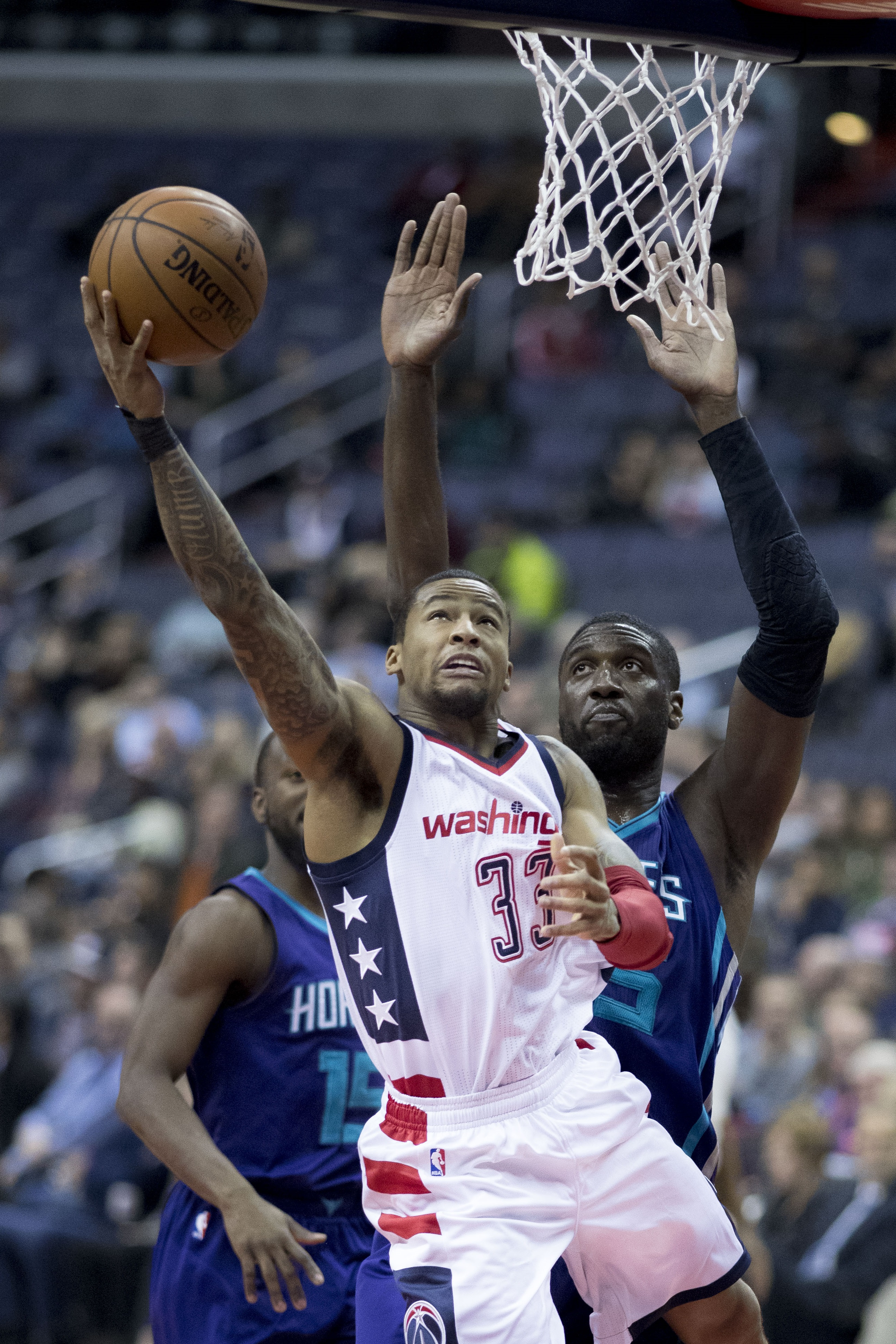
Burke performing a lay-up in 2016

On July 7, 2016, Burke was traded to the Washington Wizards in exchange for a 2021 second-round pick. He made his debut for the Wizards in their season opener on October 27, 2016, scoring eight points off the bench in a 114–99 loss to the Atlanta Hawks. On December 30, 2016, he scored a season-high 27 points off the bench as the Wizards beat the Brooklyn Nets 118–95 to win their third consecutive game and reach .500 for the first time in 2016–17. Burke made his first seven shots of the game and scored 20 in the first half on a night when his former Michigan one-on-one training partner Caris LeVert had his first double digit scoring night for the Brooklyn Nets. Burke matched his season high of 27 points on 10–13 shooting in the April 12 regular season finale against the Miami Heat as most of the starters rested for the playoffs. However, Burke saw little action after the signing of Brandon Jennings as John Wall's primary backup at the end of February. Following the season Washington did not extend Burke a qualifying offer, making him an unrestricted free agent.

During the 2017 offseason, Burke agreed to a non-guaranteed deal with the Oklahoma City Thunder, but then changed his mind, opting to remain a free agent.

=== Westchester Knicks (2017–2018) ===
On October 11, 2017, Burke signed with the New York Knicks. Three days later, he was waived by the Knicks. Burke was announced to be on the Westchester Knicks roster on October 23. In his second game with Westchester on November 7, Burke tallied 43 points, six rebounds, three assists and three steals in 40 minutes to set a Westchester single-game scoring record. On December 11, 2017, Burke earned G League Performer of the Week recognition after averaging 31.3 points per game over four games in the prior week. At the time, he was second in the G League with a 25.6-point average. He repeated as performer of the week on December 18 after posting 3 30-point games and averaging 33.7 points. Burke averaged 29.7 points per game to lead Westchester to a 9–4 record in December, which earned him G League Performer of the Month for December.

=== New York Knicks (2018–2019) ===
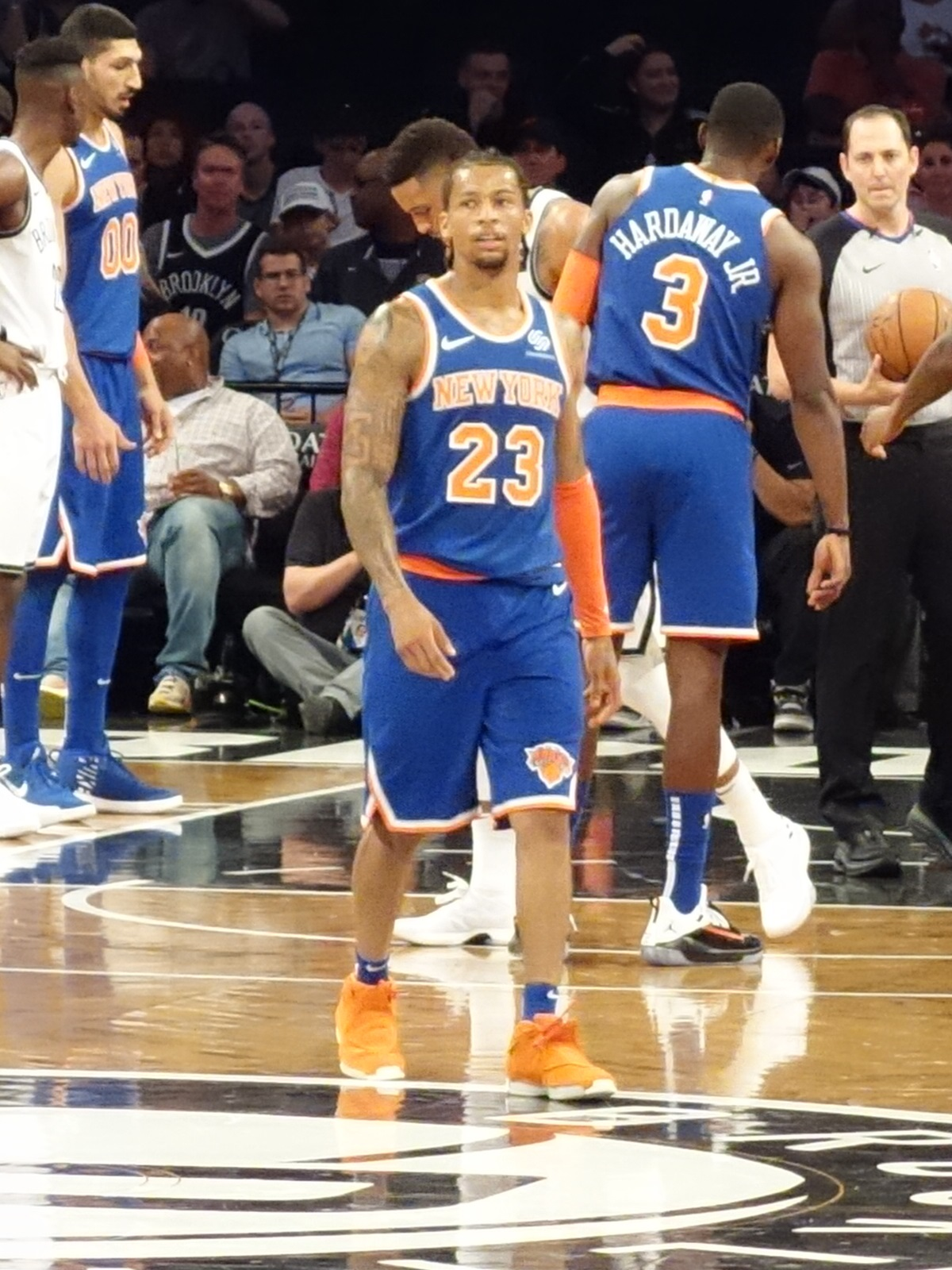
Burke with the New York Knicks in 2018

On January 14, 2018, Burke signed with the New York Knicks after averaging 26.6 points (2nd in the G League), while averaging 5.4 assists, 3.3 rebounds and 1.9 steals with Westchester. The transaction reunited Burke with Michigan teammate Hardaway. The Knicks had waived Ramon Sessions the day before to make way for Burke to join the Knick point guard rotation along with Jarrett Jack and Frank Ntilikina. He debuted on Martin Luther King Day the next day, with 5 points and 2 assists in 8 minutes of play to provide a key spark in a 119–104 victory over a crosstown Brooklyn Nets lineup that included former Michigan teammates Levert and Stauskas. On January 25, Burke contributed an 18-point/11-assist double-double off the bench against the Denver Nuggets. On February 2, 2018, Burke was one of 24 players selected to the Midseason All-NBA G League Team. In the first game after the 2018 NBA All-Star Game on February 22, Burke posted 26 points and 6 assists against the Orlando Magic to help the Knicks end an 8-game losing streak. On February 24, 2018, in a 121–112 home loss against the Boston Celtics, Burke posted 26 points for the second time in a row, along with 8 assists, becoming the first Knick to post 26 points or more and 6 or more assists in back to back games since Nate Robinson did so on March 10, 11, and 13, 2009. In a 137–128 overtime loss at the Charlotte Hornets on March 26, 2018, Burke posted a career-high 42 points along with 12 assists. He also became the first Knick to have a 40+ point and 10+ assist game since Stephon Marbury on March 29, 2005. On March 31, Burke tied his career high with 15 assists against the Detroit Pistons. Burke finished the season with averages of 12.6 points, 4.6 assists and 1.9 rebounds in 35 NBA games and he was recognized as a 2017–18 All-NBA G League Third Team honoree.

On November 18, 2018, Burke posted an early season high of 31 points against the Orlando Magic.

=== Dallas Mavericks (2019) ===
On January 31, 2019, Burke was traded to the Dallas Mavericks along with Kristaps Porziņģis, Tim Hardaway Jr. and Courtney Lee in exchange for Dennis Smith Jr., DeAndre Jordan, Wesley Matthews and two future first round draft picks.

=== Philadelphia 76ers (2019–2020) ===
On July 30, 2019, Burke signed with the Philadelphia 76ers. On December 7, 2019, Burke scored a season-high 21 points in a win over the Cavaliers. On February 6, 2020, he was waived.

=== Return to Dallas (2020–2022) ===
On July 1, 2020, following the suspension of the NBA season, Burke signed with the Dallas Mavericks in replacement of the injured Jalen Brunson. In his first game back with the Mavericks, he scored 31 points and made a career high 8 three pointers in a 153–149 loss to the Houston Rockets.

On December 1, 2020, Burke signed a three-year, $10 million contract with the Mavericks.

On June 24, 2022, Burke, Boban Marjanović, Marquese Chriss, Sterling Brown and the draft rights to Wendell Moore Jr. were traded to the Houston Rockets in exchange for Christian Wood.

On September 30, 2022, Burke was traded, along with David Nwaba, Sterling Brown, and Marquese Chriss, to the Oklahoma City Thunder in exchange for Derrick Favors, Ty Jerome, Maurice Harkless, Théo Maledon and a future second-round pick. Burke never joined the Thunder for the 2022 preseason, and he was waived on October 17 following the conclusion of the preseason schedule.

=== Stockton Kings (2022–2023) ===
On December 9, 2022, Burke was acquired by the Stockton Kings of the NBA G League.

=== Mexico City Capitanes (2023) ===
On August 8, 2023, the Golden State Warriors held a free agent workout with Burke. On October 23, Burke's rights were traded to the Mexico City Capitanes. During the 2023 NBA G League Showcase, Burke suffered a season-ending injury. On December 8, 2023, he was added to the Season-Ending Injury list.

=== Mets de Guaynabo (2024) ===
On July 23, 2024, Burke signed with the Mets de Guaynabo of the Baloncesto Superior Nacional.

=== Return to Mexico City (2024–2025) ===
On October 28, 2024, Burke returned to the Capitanes. On February 7, 2025, he parted ways with the team.

=== Guangdong Southern Tigers (2025) ===
On February 7, 2025, Burke signed with the Guangdong Southern Tigers of the Chinese Basketball Association (CBA). On February 25, the team completed the registration of Trey Burke.

== National team career ==
On July 18, 2014, Burke was named to practice with the USA Basketball National Select Team from July 28–31.

== Career statistics ==
Legend
GP	Games played	GS	Games started	MPG	Minutes per game
FG%	Field goal percentage	3P%	3-point field goal percentage	FT%	Free throw percentage
RPG	Rebounds per game	APG	Assists per game	SPG	Steals per game
BPG	Blocks per game	PPG	Points per game	**Bold**	Career high

=== NBA ===
==== Regular season ====
Year	Team	GP	GS	MPG	FG%	3P%	FT%	RPG	APG	SPG	BPG	PPG
2013–14	Utah	70	**68**	**32.3**	.380	.330	.903	**3.0**	**5.7**	.6	.1	**12.8**
2014–15	Utah	**76**	43	30.1	.368	.318	.752	2.7	4.3	.9	**.2**	**12.8**
2015–16	Utah	64	0	21.3	.413	.344	.817	1.8	2.3	.5	.1	10.6
2016–17	Washington	57	0	12.3	.457	**.443**	.759	.8	1.8	.2	.1	5.0
2017–18	New York	36	9	21.8	**.503**	.362	.649	2.0	4.7	.7	.1	**12.8**
2018–19	New York	33	7	20.9	.413	.349	.827	1.9	2.8	.6	**.2**	11.8
2018–19	Dallas	25	1	17.4	.463	.356	.837	1.5	2.6	.5	.1	9.7
2019–20	Philadelphia	25	0	13.2	.465	.421	.722	1.4	2.1	.3	.0	5.9
2019–20	Dallas	8	1	23.9	.427	.432	**.909**	1.9	3.8	**1.1**	.1	12.0
2020–21	Dallas	62	1	14.7	.428	.354	.895	.9	1.3	.6	.1	6.6
2021–22	Dallas	42	0	10.5	.391	.317	.870	.8	1.4	.3	.0	5.1
Career		498	130	20.9	.410	.345	.810	1.8	3.1	.6	.1	9.6

==== Playoffs ====
Year	Team	GP	GS	MPG	FG%	3P%	FT%	RPG	APG	SPG	BPG	PPG
2017	Washington	3	0	6.6	.000	.000	.000	.0	1.7	.0	.0	.0
2020	Dallas	6	**3**	**26.0**	**.508**	**.471**	.600	**3.2**	**2.0**	**1.3**	**.3**	**12.3**
2021	Dallas	2	0	8.5	.000	.000	.500	.5	.5	.0	.0	.5
2022	Dallas	**10**	0	3.7	.500	.400	**1.000**	.3	.4	.1	.0	3.2
Career		21	3	11.0	.446	.375	.722	1.1	1.0	.4	.1	5.1

=== College ===
Year	Team	GP	GS	MPG	FG%	3P%	FT%	RPG	APG	SPG	BPG	PPG
2011–12	Michigan	34	32	**36.1**	.433	.348	.744	**3.5**	4.6	.9	.4	14.8
2012–13	Michigan	**39**	**39**	35.3	**.463**	**.384**	**.801**	3.2	**6.7**	**1.6**	**.5**	**18.6**
Career		73	71	35.7	.450	.367	.777	3.3	5.7	1.3	.5	16.9

== Personal life ==
Burke's grandfather starred at East High School in Columbus in the 1950s and his father starred at Eastmoor Academy in the 1980s before going on to set records at Northwest Missouri State University. Three of Burke's Northland teammates are former Big Ten competitors: Sullinger (Ohio State), J. D. Weatherspoon (Ohio State) and Javon Cornley (Indiana, football). On October 8, 2017, Burke married his high school sweetheart, De'Monique Chenault, and together they have two children, a son, who was born in 2014, and a daughter, who was born in 2018.

== See also ==
- Michigan Wolverines men's basketball statistical leaders
