= 2012–13 Louisville Cardinals men's basketball team =

American college basketball season

2012–2013 Louisville Cardinals men's basketball

NCAA tournament National Champions (vacated) Big East tournament champions (Vacated) Big East regular season co-champions (Vacated)

National Championship Game, W 82–76 vs. Michigan (vacated)
- Conference: Big East

Ranking
- Coaches: No. 1
- AP: No. 2
- Record: 0–5 (35 wins vacated) (0–4 Big East)
- Head coach: Rick Pitino (12th season)
- Assistant coaches: Wyking Jones; Kevin Keatts; Kareem Richardson
- Home arena: KFC Yum! Center

2012–13 Big East men's basketball standings
	Conf.				Overall
Team	W		L	PCT	W		L	PCT
No. 2 Louisville†**	14	–	4	.778	35	–	5	.875
No. 8 Georgetown	14	–	4	.778	25	–	7	.781
No. 15 Marquette	14	–	4	.778	26	–	9	.743
No. 20 Pittsburgh	12	–	6	.667	24	–	9	.727
No. 16 Syracuse	11	–	7	.611	30	–	10	.750
No. 23 Notre Dame	11	–	7	.611	25	–	10	.714
Villanova	10	–	8	.556	20	–	14	.588
Connecticut*	10	–	8	.556	20	–	10	.667
Cincinnati	9	–	9	.500	22	–	12	.647
Providence	9	–	9	.500	19	–	15	.559
St. John's	8	–	10	.444	17	–	16	.515
Rutgers	5	–	13	.278	15	–	16	.484
Seton Hall	3	–	15	.167	15	–	18	.455
South Florida	3	–	15	.167	12	–	19	.387
DePaul	2	–	16	.111	11	–	21	.344
† 2013 Big East tournament winner As of March 30, 2013; Rankings from AP Poll; *Ineligible for postseason play due to APR penalties.

The 2012–13 Louisville Cardinals men's basketball team represented the University of Louisville during the 2012–13 NCAA Division I men's basketball season, Louisville's 99th season of intercollegiate competition. The Cardinals competed in the Big East Conference and were coached by Rick Pitino in his 12th season as head coach at Louisville. The team played its home games on Denny Crum Court at the KFC Yum! Center. The Cardinals finished the season 35–5, 14–4 in Big East play to earn a share of the Big East regular season championship.

They won the Big East tournament for the third time in school history and received the conference's automatic bid to the NCAA tournament. The Cardinals earned a trip to the school's tenth Final Four and defeated Michigan to win the NCAA Championship.

All wins and championships from this season were later vacated as a part of NCAA sanctions levied against the University of Louisville in response to the 2015 University of Louisville basketball sex scandal and the team's championship banner was removed, it was replaced by a new banner in 2023 that instead honors the team's #1 rank in the final coaches poll.

== Pre-season ==
The Cardinals were the consensus No. 2 team in the preseason polls and were picked to win Big East conference by the media and the coaches. They returned five of nine players from the 2012 Final Four team led by senior and Big East Pre-Season Player of the Year Peyton Siva. They lost senior Mike Marra to a knee injury on the first day of practice.

=== Departures ===
Name	Number	Pos.	Height	Weight	Year	Hometown	Notes
Rakeem Buckles	4	PF	6'8"	200	Senior	Miami, Florida	Transferred to FIU
Elisha Justice	22	PG	5'11"	170	Sophomore	Dorton, Kentucky	Transferred to Pikeville
Kyle Kuric	14	SG	6'4"	185	Senior	Evansville, Indiana	Graduated
Chris Smith	5	G	6'3"	200	Senior	Sacramento, California	Graduated
Jared Swopshire	21	SF	6'7"	215	Junior	St. Louis, Missouri	Graduated. Transferred to Northwestern for grad school.

=== Class of 2012 signees ===
College recruiting information
Name	Hometown	School	Height	Weight	Commit date
Montrezl Harrell; PF	Tarboro, NC	North Edgecombe Magnet HS	6 ft 8 in (2.03 m)	235 lb (107 kg)	Apr 6, 2012
Montrezl Harrell; PF	Recruit ratings: Scout: Rivals: (92)				
Mangok Mathiang; C	Melbourne, Australia	IMG Academy Bradenton, FL	6 ft 10 in (2.08 m)	200 lb (91 kg)	Aug 19, 2012
Mangok Mathiang; C	Recruit ratings: Scout: Rivals: (60)				
Overall recruit ranking: Scout: NR Rivals: NR ESPN: NR
Note: In many cases, Scout, Rivals, 247Sports, On3, and ESPN may conflict in their listings of height and weight.; In these cases, the average was taken. ESPN grades are on a 100-point scale.; Sources: "Louisville Basketball Commitment List". Rivals.; "2012 Louisville Basketball Commitment List". Scout.; "ESPN". ESPN.; "Scout.com Team Recruiting Rankings". Scout.; "2012 Team Ranking". Rivals.

== Roster ==
2012–13 Louisville Cardinals men's basketball team
Players
Coaches

Pos.	#	Name	Height	Weight	Year	Previous school	Hometown
G	2	Russ Smith	6 ft 0 in (1.83 m)	160 lb (73 kg)	Jr	Archbishop Molloy HS (NY)	Brooklyn, New York
G	3	Peyton Siva	6 ft 0 in (1.83 m)	180 lb (82 kg)	Sr	Franklin	Seattle, Washington
G	5	Kevin Ware (injured)	6 ft 5 in (1.96 m)	185 lb (84 kg)	So	Rockdale County	Conyers, Georgia
C	10	Gorgui Dieng	6 ft 11 in (2.11 m)	235 lb (107 kg)	Jr	Huntington Prep (WV)	Kebemer, Senegal
F	11	Luke Hancock	6 ft 6 in (1.98 m)	200 lb (91 kg)	RS Jr	Hargrave Military Academy; George Mason	Roanoke, Virginia
C	12	Mangok Mathiang (redshirt)	6 ft 10 in (2.08 m)	200 lb (91 kg)	Fr	IMG Academy (FL)	Melbourne, Australia
G	14	Logan Baumann	6 ft 0 in (1.83 m)	165 lb (75 kg)	Fr	Ohio County	Hartford, Kentucky
G	15	Tim Henderson	6 ft 2 in (1.88 m)	180 lb (82 kg)	Jr	Christian Academy	Louisville, Kentucky
G	20	Wayne Blackshear	6 ft 5 in (1.96 m)	225 lb (102 kg)	So	Morgan Park	Chicago, Illinois
F	21	Chane Behanan	6 ft 6 in (1.98 m)	245 lb (111 kg)	So	Bowling Green (KY)	Cincinnati, Ohio
F	24	Montrezl Harrell	6 ft 7 in (2.01 m)	225 lb (102 kg)	Fr	Hargrave Military Academy (VA)	Tarboro, North Carolina
C	25	Zach Price	6 ft 10 in (2.08 m)	235 lb (107 kg)	So	Jeffersontown	Louisville, Kentucky
G	32	Michael Baffour	6 ft 2 in (1.88 m)	170 lb (77 kg)	Jr	Bryan Station	Lexington, Kentucky
G	33	Mike Marra (injured)	6 ft 5 in (1.96 m)	200 lb (91 kg)	Sr	Northfield Mount Hermon (MA)	Esmond, Rhode Island
F	44	Stephan Van Treese	6 ft 8 in (2.03 m)	235 lb (107 kg)	Sr	Lawrence North	Indianapolis, Indiana

Head coach

- Rick Pitino (UMass)

Assistant coach(es)

- Wyking Jones (Loyola Marymount)
- Kevin Keatts (Ferrum)
- Kareem Richardson (Evansville)

Legend

- (C) Team captain
- (S) Suspended
- (I) Ineligible
- (W) Walk-on
- Injured
- Current redshirt

== Regular season ==
=== Out of conference ===
Louisville opened with two exhibition victories and 3 wins at home. They played in the Battle 4 Atlantis tournament where they defeated #13 Missouri by 23 before losing to #5 Duke in the championship game. Gorgui Dieng suffered a broken wrist in the Missouri game and did not play against Duke. Louisville won the rest of its out of conference slate including victories at Memphis in the Hall of Fame Shootout and victories against in state rivals Western Kentucky and Kentucky. They entered Big East play with a 12–1 record.

=== Departures ===
Name	Number	Pos.	Height	Weight	Year	Hometown	Notes
Angel Nunez	1	SF	6'7"	190	Sophomore	Washington Heights, New York	Transferred to Gonzaga

=== Big East ===
The Cardinals opened Big East play with four victories, and were voted #1 in both AP and Coaches Polls in week 10. They then dropped three straight, a 2-point home loss to #6 Syracuse and back to back road losses at Villanova and Georgetown. The Cardinals won 10 of their next 11 with the one loss at Notre Dame in a 5 OT game that is the longest regular season game in Big East history. They finished the regular season with a 26–5 (14–4) record and claimed a three-way tie with Georgetown and Marquette as Big East Regular Season Champions.

Junior guard Russ Smith was named a Sporting News Third Team All-American. Senior co-captain Peyton Siva was named 2013 American Eagle Outfitters BIG EAST Men's Basketball Scholar-Athlete of the Year. Junior Gorgui Dieng was named 2013 Big East Defensive Player of the Year. Smith and Dieng were named to the 2013 All-Big East First team. Siva was named to the All-Big East Third Team.

== Postseason ==
=== Big East tournament ===
The Cardinals were the number 2 seed in the tournament and faced Villanova in the quarter-finals, defeating them, 74–55. They next defeated number 24 Notre Dame, 69–57, setting up the final Big East tournament championship game against number 19 Syracuse. Louisville was down by 16 in the second half, but rallied to claim their third Big East tournament championship with a 78–61 victory. The Cardinals repeated as tournament champions.

=== NCAA tournament ===
Louisville received the number 1 overall seed in the Midwest Region of the NCAA tournament. They opened the tournament with a 79–48 win over North Carolina A&T, setting the NCAA tournament single-game record for steals with 20. They closed out the opening weekend by defeating Colorado State, 82–56. They defeated Oregon in the regional semi-final, 77–69, to set up a regional final with Duke, whom they had lost to in the season-opening tournament. Before halftime of the game Louisville guard Kevin Ware suffered a compound fracture. The Cardinals rallied together to defeat Duke by 22 (the largest tournament defeat for coach Mike Krzyzewski since the 1990 National Title Game), 85–63.

The Cardinals advanced to their second consecutive Final Four (their 10th) to face Wichita State. The Shockers led most of the game, and were up by as many as 12 with 13 minutes to play. A 20-point performance by Luke Hancock, and two timely three-point shots by walk-on Tim Henderson, kept the Cardinals in the game, which they won, 72–68, to advance to face Michigan in the National Championship.

In its third NCAA Championship game Louisville went down 12 points. The Cardinals rallied behind a 22-point effort by Final Four MOP Luke Hancock, 18 points and 5 assists from senior captain Peyton Siva, and 15 points and 12 rebounds from sophomore Chane Behanan to win, 82–76, giving Louisville basketball its third NCAA Championship and giving coach Rick Pitino his first title at Louisville.

== Schedule and results ==
Date time, TV	Rank^{#}	Opponent^{#}	Result	Record	High points	High rebounds	High assists	Site (attendance) city, state
Exhibition
November 1, 2012*; 7:00 pm, WHAS	No. 2	Pikeville	W 93–57	–	19 – Harrell	13 – Harrell	6 – Siva	KFC Yum! Center (20,277); Louisville, KY
November 7, 2012*; 7:00 pm, WHAS	No. 2	Bellarmine	W 65–46	–	16 – Harrell	12 – Dieng	7 – Siva	KFC Yum! Center (20,422); Louisville, KY
Non-conference regular season
November 11, 2012*; 4:00 pm, WHAS	No. 2	Manhattan	W 79–51	1–0	23 – Smith	9 – Behanan	10 – Siva	KFC Yum! Center (20,921); Louisville, KY
November 15, 2012*; 7:00 pm, WHAS	No. 2	Samford; Battle 4 Atlantis Opening Game	W 80–54	2–0	18 – Smith	18 – Behanan	7 – Siva	KFC Yum! Center (20,016); Louisville, KY
November 18, 2012*; 4:00 pm, WHAS	No. 2	Miami (OH)	W 80–39	3–0	23 – Smith	9 – Dieng	10 – Siva	KFC Yum! Center (20,258); Louisville, KY
November 22, 2012*; 9:30 pm, NBCSN	No. 2	vs. Northern Iowa; Battle 4 Atlantis Quarterfinal	W 51–46	4–0	16 – Smith	9 – Dieng	5 – Smith	Atlantis Resort (3,126); Nassau, Bahamas
November 23, 2012*; 9:30 pm, NBCSN	No. 2	vs. No. 13 Missouri; Battle 4 Atlantis	W 84–61	5–0	19 – Hancock	6 – Tied	6 – Siva	Atlantis Resort (3,153); Nassau, Bahamas
November 24, 2012*; 9:30 pm, NBCSN	No. 2	vs. No. 5 Duke; Battle 4 Atlantis	L 71–76	5–1	19 – Siva	8 – Van Treese	4 – Siva	Atlantis Resort (3,511); Nassau, Bahamas
December 1, 2012*; 1:00 pm, WHAS/ESPN3	No. 5	Illinois State	W 69–66	6–1	24 – Smith	9 – Behanan	4 – Tied	KFC Yum! Center (19,816); Louisville, KY
December 4, 2012*; 9:00 pm, ESPNU	No. 5	at College of Charleston	W 80–38	7–1	18 – Blackshear	10 – Van Treese	4 – Smith	TD Arena (5,117); Charleston, SC
December 8, 2012*; 2:00 pm, ESPN3	No. 5	UMKC	W 99–47	8–1	31 – Smith	7 – Tied	6 – Siva	KFC Yum! Center (20,074); Louisville, KY
December 15, 2012*; 2:30 pm, FSN	No. 6	at Memphis; Basketball Hall of Fame Shootout	W 87–78	9–1	22 – Behanan	6 – Harrell	7 – Siva	FedEx Forum (18,392); Memphis, TN
December 19, 2012*; 7:00 pm, WHAS/ESPN3	No. 5	FIU; Billy Minardi Classic	W 79–55	10–1	18 – Blackshear	11 – Behanan	12 – Siva	KFC Yum! Center (21,411); Louisville, KY
December 22, 2012*; 8:30 pm, ESPNU	No. 5	vs. WKU	W 78–55	11–1	20 – Smith	8 – Blackshear	5 – Siva	Bridgestone Arena (10,728); Nashville, TN
December 29, 2012*; 4:00 pm, CBS	No. 4	Kentucky; Battle for the Bluegrass	W 80–77	12–1	21 – Smith	7 – Tied	3 – Tied	KFC Yum! Center (22,810); Louisville, KY
Big East regular season
January 2, 2013; 6:00 pm, Big East/WHAS/ESPN3	No. 4	Providence	W 80–62	13–1 (1–0)	23 – Smith	11 – Dieng	8 – Siva	KFC Yum! Center (21,305); Louisville, KY
January 9, 2013; 7:00 pm, ESPN2	No. 3	at Seton Hall	W 73–58	14–1 (2–0)	16 – Dieng	14 – Dieng	7 – Siva	Prudential Center (7,013); Newark, NJ
January 12, 2013; 4:00 pm, Big East/WHAS/ESPN3	No. 3	South Florida	W 64–38	15–1 (3–0)	17 – Siva	16 – Dieng	1 – Tied	KFC Yum! Center (21,903); Louisville, KY
January 14, 2013; 7:00 pm, ESPN	No. 1	at Connecticut	W 73–58	16–1 (4–0)	23 – Smith	16 – Dieng	5 – Behanan	XL Center (14,287); Hartford, CT
January 19, 2013; 4:00 pm, ESPN	No. 1	No. 6 Syracuse	L 68–70	16–2 (4–1)	25 – Smith	11 – Behanan	6 – Dieng, Siva	KFC Yum! Center (22,814); Louisville, KY
January 22, 2013; 8:00 pm, Big East/WHAS/ESPN3	No. 5	at Villanova	L 64–73	16–3 (4–2)	17 – Blackshear	9 – Dieng	13 – Siva	Wells Fargo Center (11,887); Philadelphia, PA
January 26, 2013; 12:00 pm, ESPN	No. 5	at Georgetown	L 51–53	16–4 (4–3)	12 – Tied	8 – Tied	1 – Tied	Verizon Center (17,474); Washington, D.C.
January 28, 2013; 7:00 pm, ESPN	No. 12	Pittsburgh	W 64–61	17–4 (5–3)	20 – Smith	12 – Dieng	10 – Siva	KFC Yum! Center (22,411); Louisville, KY
February 3, 2013; 2:00 pm, ESPN	No. 12	No. 25 Marquette	W 70–51	18–4 (6–3)	18 – Smith	8 – Dieng	7 – Siva	KFC Yum! Center (21,418); Louisville, KY
February 6, 2013; 7:30 pm, Big East/WHAS/ESPN3	No. 11	at Rutgers	W 68–48	19–4 (7–3)	19 – Blackshear	8 – Dieng	7 – Siva	Louis Brown Athletic Center (5,862); Piscataway, NJ
February 9, 2013; 9:00 pm, ESPN	No. 11	at No. 25 Notre Dame; ESPN College Gameday	L 101–104 ^{5 OT}	19–5 (7–4)	30 – Behanan	15 – Behanan	5 – Dieng	Joyce Center (9,149); Notre Dame, IN
February 14, 2013; 9:00 pm, ESPN	No. 12	St. John's	W 72–58	20–5 (8–4)	24 – Smith	17 – Dieng	6 – Siva	KFC Yum! Center (22,086); Louisville, KY
February 17, 2013; 1:00 pm, ESPN	No. 12	at South Florida	W 59–41	21–5 (9–4)	15 – Smith	10 – Dieng	7 – Siva	USF Sun Dome (7,368); Tampa, FL
February 23, 2013; 12:00 pm, Big East/WHAS/ESPN3	No. 10	Seton Hall	W 79–61	22–5 (10–4)	23 – Dieng	8 – Dieng, Behanan	5 – Siva, Smith	KFC Yum! Center (22,332); Louisville, KY
February 27, 2013; 9:00 pm, ESPNU	No. 10	at DePaul	W 79–58	23–5 (11–4)	17 – Smith	9 – Behanan	6 – Siva	Allstate Arena (8,654); Rosemont, IL
March 2, 2013; 12:00 pm, CBS	No. 10	at No. 12 Syracuse	W 58–53	24–5 (12–4)	18 – Smith	14 – Dieng	5 – Smith	Carrier Dome (31,173); Syracuse, NY
March 4, 2013; 7:00 pm, ESPN	No. 8	Cincinnati	W 67–51	25–5 (13–4)	18 – Smith	9 – Dieng	4 – Siva	KFC Yum! Center (22,739); Louisville, KY
March 9, 2013; 4:00 pm, CBS	No. 8	No. 24 Notre Dame; Senior Day	W 73–57	26–5 (14–4)	20 – Dieng	11 – Dieng	5 – Siva	KFC Yum! Center (22,815); Louisville, KY
Big East tournament
March 14, 2013; 7:00 pm, ESPN	(2) No. 4	vs. (7) Villanova; Quarterfinal	W 74–55	27–5	28 – Smith	8 – Van Treese	4 – Siva	Madison Square Garden (20,057); New York, NY
March 15, 2013; 9:50 pm, ESPN	(2) No. 4	vs. (6) No. 24 Notre Dame; Semifinal	W 69–57	28–5	20 – Smith	12 – Dieng	6 – Siva, Smith	Madison Square Garden (20,057); New York, NY
March 16, 2013; 8:30 pm, ESPN	(2) No. 4	vs. (5) No. 19 Syracuse; Championship Game	W 78–61	29–5	20 – Harrell	9 – Dieng	8 – Siva/Dieng	Madison Square Garden (20,057); New York, NY
NCAA tournament
March 21, 2013*; 6:50 pm, TBS	(1 MW) No. 2	vs. (16 MW) North Carolina A&T; First round	W 79–48	30–5	23 – Smith	7 – Dieng, Van Treese	8 – Siva	Rupp Arena (23,500); Lexington, KY
March 23, 2013*; 5:15 pm, CBS	(1 MW) No. 2	vs. (8 MW) Colorado State; Second round	W 82–56	31–5	27 – Smith	4 – Harrell, Blackshear	5 – Siva, Ware	Rupp Arena (23,500); Lexington, KY
March 29, 2013*; 7:15 pm, CBS	(1 MW) No. 2	vs. (12 MW) No. 25 Oregon; Sweet Sixteen	W 77–69	32–5	31 – Smith	9 – Dieng	3 – Siva, Smith	Lucas Oil Stadium (35,520); Indianapolis, IN
March 31, 2013*; 5:05 pm, CBS	(1 MW) No. 2	vs. (2 MW) No. 6 Duke; Elite Eight	W 85–63	33–5	23 – Smith	11 – Dieng	4 – Siva	Lucas Oil Stadium (34,657); Indianapolis, IN
April 6, 2013*; 6:09 pm, CBS	(1 MW) No. 2	vs. (9 W) Wichita State; Final Four	W 72–68	34–5	21 – Smith	9 – Behanan	3 – Siva, Smith	Georgia Dome (75,350); Atlanta, GA
April 8, 2013*; 9:23 pm, CBS	(1 MW) No. 2	vs. (4 S) No. T-10 Michigan; National Championship	W 82–76	35–5	22 – Hancock	12 – Behanan	6 – Dieng	Georgia Dome (74,326); Atlanta, GA
*Non-conference game. ^{#}Rankings from AP Poll. (#) Tournament seedings in parentheses. All times are in Eastern Time. (#) during NCAA tournament is seed with Region MW=Midwest W=West.

== Rankings ==
Ranking movements Legend: ██ Increase in ranking ██ Decrease in ranking
	Week																			
Poll	Pre	1	2	3	4	5	6	7	8	9	10	11	12	13	14	15	16	17	18	Final
AP	2	2	2	5	5	6	5	4	4	3	1	5	12	11	12	10	10	8	4	2
Coaches	2	2	2	6	6	6	4	3	4	4	1	5	13	12	12	10	9	6	4	1

== Awards ==
Sporting News Third Team All-America
Russ Smith
Capital One Academic All-America
Peyton Siva
American Eagle Outfitters BIG EAST Men's Basketball Scholar-Athlete of the Year
Peyton Siva
Big East Defensive Player of the Year
Gorgui Dieng
NCAA Final Four Most Outstanding Player
Luke Hancock
NCAA Final Four all-tournament team
Chane Behanan
Luke Hancock
Peyton Siva
NCAA (Midwest) Most Outstanding Player
Russ Smith
NCAA Midwest Regional all-tournament team
Russ Smith
Gorgui Dieng
Peyton Siva
Big East tournament Most Outstanding Player
Peyton Siva
Big East Championship All-Tournament Team
Peyton Siva
Russ Smith
First Team All-Big East
Gorgui Dieng
Russ Smith
Third Team All-Big East
Peyton Siva
Frances Pomeroy Naismith Award (top Division I senior 6'0"/1.83 m or shorter)
Peyton Siva
Elite 89 Award (top GPA among upperclass players at Final Four)
Wayne Blackshear

Best Coach/Manager ESPY Award

Rick Pitino

== Controversies and scandals ==
A former Louisville player, Andre McGee, arranged and paid for strippers and prostitutes to perform striptease dances and sexual acts for 17 prospective and former basketball players from 2010 to 2014. On October 3, 2015, the book publisher IBJ Custom Publishing released a book entitled Breaking Cardinal Rules. Based on revelations provided by the local self-described escort, Katina Powell, the book detailed striptease dances and acts of prostitution that Powell and McGee arranged and organized in Minardi Hall over approximately a four-year period.

During the investigation of the allegations, the university self-imposed a ban on the 2016 NCAA tournament. In June 2017, the NCAA announced that the university would lose four basketball scholarships over the course of four seasons, but there would be no further postseason ban. The NCAA had initially suspended head coach Rick Pitino for five ACC games during the 2017–18 season, but the Louisville athletic association board agreed unanimously to fire Pitino before the season on October 16, 2017. The NCAA also ordered the university to vacate all wins from 2011 to 2014 (including the 2013 National Championship) that included ineligible players, a decision that the university appealed. On February 20, 2018, the NCAA upheld the decision.

== Notable achievements ==
- Peyton Siva became Louisville's 64th 1000 point scorer in a 64–38 victory over South Florida on January 12, 2013.
- Russ Smith became the 65th 1000 point scorer in a 79–58 victory over DePaul on February 27, 2013.
- Rick Pitino won his 300th game as Louisville's Head Coach in a 67–51 victory over Cincinnati on March 4, 2013.
- Russ Smith broke the Louisville record for most made free throws in a season previous set by Wes Unseld (177) in the 1967–68 season.
- Peyton Siva broke the Louisville record for most steals in a season with 90 steals, passing the 87 steals Russ Smith had in the 2011–12 season.
- Peyton Siva broke the Louisville record for most career steals with 254 steals, when he passed Darrell Griffith's record of 230 steals he had from 1976 to 1980.
- Peyton Siva tied the Big East tournament record for most steals in a game (7) in the semifinal game against Notre Dame.
- Peyton Siva won his second Big East tournament MVP award, becoming only the second player to win this award multiple times (Patrick Ewing)
- Peyton Siva set a Big East tournament career record with 29 steals, breaking the old mark of 28, held by Pittsburgh's Brandin Knight since 2003.
- The team set the NCAA tournament record for steals in a single game with 20 in a second-round game against North Carolina A&T.
- Russ Smith tied the individual NCAA tournament single game record for steals with 8 against North Carolina A&T (tied with – Ty Lawson 2009)
- Set school record with 35 wins during the season passing the 33 wins the 1979–80 and 2004–05 teams had.
- Luke Hancock is the first and only reserve player to be awarded the Final Four MOP Award.
