= Luke Hancock =

American basketball player (born 1990)

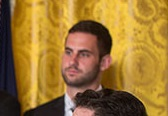
- Hancock at the White House in 2013

Personal information
- Born: January 30, 1990 (age 36) Roanoke, Virginia, U.S.
- Listed height: 6 ft 6 in (1.98 m)
- Listed weight: 200 lb (91 kg)

Career information
- High school: Hidden Valley (Roanoke, Virginia)
- College: George Mason (2009–2011); Louisville (2012–2014)
- NBA draft: 2014: undrafted
- Playing career: 2014–2014
- Position: Small forward

Career history
- 2014: Panionios

Career highlights
- NCAA champion (2013); NCAA Final Four Most Outstanding Player (2013); Third-team All-CAA (2011); CAA All-Rookie Team (2010)
- Stats at Basketball Reference

Patrick Lucas Hancock (born January 30, 1990) is an American former basketball player. He played college basketball for the University of Louisville after transferring from George Mason University. While at Louisville, he won the 2013 NCAA championship and was named the Final Four Most Outstanding Player, becoming the first substitute to ever win the award (later vacated due to the 2015 University of Louisville basketball sex scandal, but then restored after Hancock settled a lawsuit with the NCAA). On September 30, 2019, the NCAA reinstated Luke Hancock's MOP status (without an *) in his individual capacity. This decision did not, however, change the status of the vacated 2013 Louisville Cardinals Division I Championship. He played professionally for Panionios of the Greek Basket League in 2014 before tearing a muscle in his calf, ending his career.

== Early life ==
Hancock was born to William and Venicia Hancock. He has four brothers and one sister. Hancock attended Hidden Valley High School in Roanoke, Virginia, where he did not receive notice from college programs. He then went to Hargrave Military Academy for one year. As a high school basketball player, he was named All-State.

== College career ==
Hancock was recruited to attend George Mason University by George Mason Patriots men's basketball coach Jim Larrañaga. He played for George Mason in his freshman and sophomore years. While at George Mason, he averaged 7.7 points per game as a freshman and 10.9 points as a sophomore. In his second season, he was named to the All-Colonial Athletic Association third team. Larrañaga accepted the head coaching job at the University of Miami after the 2010–11 season, taking his entire coaching staff with him and leading Hancock to transfer. Hancock transferred to the University of Louisville, which had hired his former Hargrave coach Kevin Keatts as an assistant, and did not play in 2011–12 after transferring.

Hancock was named the captain of the Louisville Cardinals men's basketball team before appearing in a game for the Cardinals. Hancock averaged 7.7 points per game playing for Louisville in 2012–13. In the 2013 NCAA Division I men's basketball tournament, he was named the tournament's Most Outstanding Player. He scored 20 points in the national semifinals against the Wichita State Shockers. In the title game against the Michigan Wolverines, the Cardinals trailed by 12 points late in the first half before Hancock scored 14 straight points for the team to cut the deficit to one by halftime. He finished the game five-for-five on three-point shooting, and Louisville won, 82–76. He became the first reserve player in tournament history to be named the MOP.

== Professional career ==
After going undrafted in the 2014 NBA draft, Hancock joined the Orlando Magic for the Orlando Summer League and the Houston Rockets for the Las Vegas Summer League. On September 25, 2014, he signed with the Memphis Grizzlies. However, he was later waived by the Grizzlies on October 13.

On November 4, 2014, Hancock signed with Panionios of the Greek Basket League. He played in six games before tearing a muscle in his calf. The injury made Hancock realize he needed to prepare for life after basketball, so he retired from the sport, studied to become a financial adviser, and eventually began working in Louisville, Kentucky for Lamkin Wealth Management.

== After basketball ==
Hancock has continued his community involvement in Louisville, most notably with the nonprofit group Families for Effective Autism Treatment of Louisville (FEAT). He first became involved with the organization in 2014 while still attending Louisville. After returning from his brief professional career in Greece, he started organizing basketball camps for children on the autism spectrum. Hancock also served on FEAT's board of directors.

Hancock married the former Kaelyn Gault in October 2019. In 2019, Hancock joined ESPN as a studio analyst for the ACC Network.
