= Wayne Blackshear =

American basketball player (born 1992)

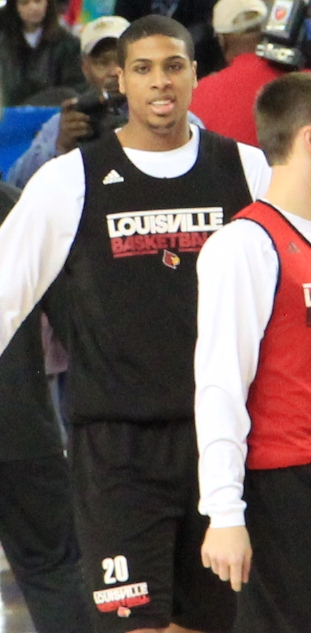
- Blackshear with the Louisville Cardinals in 2013

Personal information
- Born: February 11, 1992 (age 33) Chicago, Illinois, U.S.
- Listed height: 6 ft 5 in (1.96 m)
- Listed weight: 200 lb (91 kg)

Career information
- High school: Morgan Park (Chicago, Illinois)
- College: Louisville (2011–2015)
- NBA draft: 2015: undrafted
- Playing career: 2015–2022
- Position: Shooting guard / small forward

Career history
- 2015–2016: Pistoia
- 2016–2017: Forlì
- 2017–2018: Byblos Club
- 2018–2019: Helsinki Seagulls
- 2019–2020: Maine Red Claws
- 2020: Franklin Bulls
- 2020: Spójnia Stargard
- 2021–2022: Long Island Nets
- 2022: Maine Celtics

Career highlights
- NCAA champion (2013)*; Second-team Academic All-American (2015); Elite 89 Award (2013); First-team Parade All-American (2011); McDonald's All-American (2011); *Later vacated

Wayne Fitzgerald Blackshear (born February 11, 1992) is an American former professional basketball player. He played college basketball for the Louisville Cardinals.

== High school and college career ==
Blackshear played basketball for Curie Metropolitan High School before transferring to crosstown rival Morgan Park High School. He earned 2010 and 2011 first team All-State recognition from the Chicago Tribune, and was 2011 Chicago Sun-Times Sun-Times Player of the Year. He was a 2011 McDonald's All-American and a Parade All-American.

Between 2011 and 2015, Blackshear played college basketball for the Louisville Cardinals. As a sophomore in 2012–13, he helped the Cardinals win the 2013 NCAA Men's Division I Basketball Tournament. As a senior in 2014–15, Blackshear earned second-team Academic All-American honors and averaged 11.6 points and 4.3 rebounds in 32 games.

== Professional career ==
After going undrafted in the 2015 NBA draft, Blackshear played for the San Antonio Spurs in the Orlando and Las Vegas NBA Summer Leagues. For the 2015–16 season, Blackshear moved to Italy to play for Giorgio Tesi Group Pistoia in the Italian first division. In 31 games, he averaged 10.7 points and 3.4 rebounds per game.

After playing for the Charlotte Hornets during the 2016 Orlando Summer League, Blackshear returned to Italy for the 2016–17 season, this time with Unieuro Forlì in the Italian second division. Due to a knee injury, he played only 14 games for Forlì. He averaged 15.5 points, 5.2 rebounds, 1.7 assists and 1.4 steals per game.

Between December 22, 2017, and January 6, 2018, Blackshear played four games in Lebanon with Byblos Club. He averaged 15.5 points, 6.8 rebounds, 1.3 assists and 1.8 steals per game.

For the 2018–19 season, Blackshear moved to Finland to play for the Helsinki Seagulls. In 24 games, he averaged 18.1 points, 4.5 rebounds, 1.8 assists and 1.1 steals per game.

For the 2019–20 season, Blackshear joined the Maine Red Claws of the NBA G League.

On February 18, 2020, Blackshear signed with the Franklin Bulls in New Zealand for the 2020 NBL season.

On July 28, 2020, Blackshear signed with Spójnia Stargard of the PLK. In five games, Blackshear averaged 8.2 points and 3.2 rebounds per game. On October 25, 2020, he parted ways with the team.

On October 23, 2021, Blackshear signed with the Maine Celtics. He did not make the team's final roster.

On December 31, 2021, Blackshear was acquired by the Long Island Nets. However, he was removed from the team on January 19, 2022.

=== Maine Celtics (2022) ===
On February 11, Blackshear was acquired by the Maine Celtics. He was then later waived on February 27, 2022.
