= Northwestern State Demons basketball =

NCAA Division 1 program

Northwestern State Demons
2025–26 Northwestern State Demons basketball team
- University: Northwestern State University
- First season: 1976
- Head coach: Rick Cabrera (3rd season)
- Location: Natchitoches, Louisiana
- Arena: Prather Coliseum (capacity: 3,900)
- Conference: Southland
- Nickname: Demons
- Colors: Purple, white, and orange trim
- All-time record: 584–750 (.438)

NCAA Division I tournament round of 32
- 2006

NCAA Division I tournament appearances
- 2001, 2006, 2013

Conference tournament champions
- 2001, 2006, 2013

Conference regular-season champions
- 1922, 1940, 1949, 1954, 1955, 1958, 1960, 1974, 1975, 2005, 2006

The Northwestern State Demons basketball team is the men's basketball team that represents Northwestern State University in Natchitoches, Louisiana, United States. The team competes in the Southland Conference and The Demons have appeared in the NCAA tournament three times, most recently in 2013.

== History ==
=== Mike McConathy era (1999–2022) ===
Mike McConathy was hired in 1999. In his first season, the team went 17–13 and finished fourth in the Southland Conference.

In 2001, McConathy led the Demons to their first ever NCAA tournament appearance. The Demons won the first play in game after the NCAA expanded the men's tournament from 64 to 65 teams. The Demons defeated Winthrop in that game, before losing to Illinois in the next round.

In 2005, the Demons finished the season 21–12, 13–3 to win the Southland Conference regular season championship. However, the Demons 10-game winning streak was stopped by Southeastern Louisiana in the Southland tournament championship.

The Demons would repeat as Southland regular season champions the following year. This time, they defeated Sam Houston State in the Southland tournament championship to earn their second appearance in the NCAA tournament. In the NCAA tournament as a No. 14 seed, the Demons earned one of the biggest upsets in the tournament by beating No. 3-ranked Iowa 64–63 in the first round. Jermaine Wallace hit a three-pointer with less than a second left in the game to give the Demons the victory, their second in NCAA history. The Demons advanced to the second round where they lost to West Virginia 67–54.

After some disappointing seasons where they only finished above .500 twice, the Demons returned to prominence in the 2012–13 season when they went 23–9, 15–3 in Southland play to finish in second place. The Demons defeated Stephen F. Austin to win the Southland tournament championship and earn their third trip to the NCAA tournament. However, they lost to Florida in the round of 64 (then called the second round, which was before 2011 and since 2016 known as the first round).

== Postseason appearances ==
=== NCAA tournament ===
The Demons have appeared in the NCAA tournament three times. Their combined record is 2–3.

Year	Seed	Round	Opponent	Result
2001	No. 16	Opening round first round	No. 16 Winthrop; No. 1 Illinois	W 71–67; L 54–96
2006	No. 14	First round second round	No. 3 Iowa; No. 6 West Virginia	W 64–63; L 54–67
2013	No. 14	Second round	No. 3 Florida	L 47–79

=== CIT results ===
The Demons have appeared in the CollegeInsider.com Postseason Tournament (CIT) one time. Their record is 0–1.

Year	Round	Opponent	Result
2015	First round	UT Martin	L 79–104

=== NAIA tournament ===
The Demons have appeared in one NAIA tournament. Their record is 1–1.

Year	Round	Opponent	Result
1974	First round Second round	Millersville; Hanover	W 95–76; L 76–85

== Notable players ==
- (United States) (Israel) D'or Fischer
