= 2012–13 Southeastern Louisiana Lions basketball team =

American college basketball season

2012–13 Southeastern Louisiana Lions men's basketball
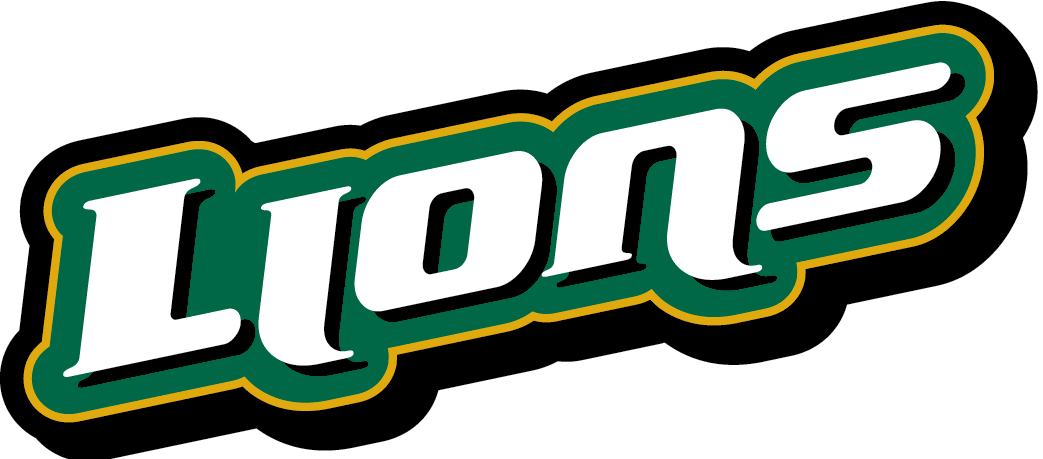
- Conference: Southland Conference
- Record: 13–18 (10–8 Southland)
- Head coach: Jim Yarbrough (8th season)
- Assistant coaches: Larry Cordaro; Alex Hausladen; Michael Cyprien
- Home arena: University Center

2012–13 Southland Conference men's basketball standings
	Conf.				Overall
Team	W		L	PCT	W		L	PCT
Stephen F. Austin	16	–	2	.889	27	–	5	.844
Northwestern State †	15	–	3	.833	23	–	9	.719
Oral Roberts	13	–	5	.722	20	–	15	.571
Southeastern Louisiana	10	–	8	.556	13	–	18	.419
Sam Houston State	8	–	10	.444	17	–	17	.500
Nicholls State	8	–	10	.444	9	–	21	.300
McNeese State	7	–	11	.389	14	–	17	.452
Central Arkansas	7	–	11	.389	13	–	17	.433
Texas A&M–Corpus Christi*	5	–	13	.278	6	–	23	.207
Lamar	1	–	17	.056	3	–	28	.097
† 2013 Southland tournament winner As of March 27, 2013 *ineligible for Postseason play due to APR Penalties; Rankings from AP Poll

The 2012–13 Southeastern Louisiana Lions basketball team represented Southeastern Louisiana University during the 2012–13 NCAA Division I men's basketball season. The Lions, led by ninth year head coach Jim Yarbrough, played their home games at the University Center and were members of the Southland Conference. They finished the season 13–18, 10–8 in Southland play to finish in fourth place. They advanced to the semifinals of the Southland tournament where they lost to Stephen F. Austin.

== Roster ==
Number	Name	Position	Height	Weight	Year	Hometown
1	Dre Evans	Guard	5–9	170	Junior	Dallas, Texas
2	Roger Woods	Forward	6–5	230	Freshman	Jackson, Mississippi
3	Avery Woodson	Guard	6–2	180	Freshman	Waynesboro, Mississippi
5	Brandon Fortenberry	Guard	6–3	185	Graduate	Picayune, Mississippi
10	Roosevelt Johnson	Forward	6–6	225	Senior	Norco, Louisiana
11	Antonnio Benton	Forward	6–7	190	Junior	Hattiesburg, Mississippi
21	Jamaal James	Center	6–8	250	Junior	Brooklyn, New York
22	Jeremy Campbell	Guard	6–4	185	Junior	Hattiesburg, Mississippi
23	Todd Nelson	Guard	6–3	185	Senior	Brandon, Mississippi
24	Jeffery Ricard	Guard	6–2	170	Junior	Plaquemine, Louisiana
25	Jan Petrovcic	Forward	6–8	225	Senior	Nova Gorica, Slovenia
32	Quin Cooper	Forward	6–5	185	Junior	Mandeville, Louisiana
33	Onochie Ochie	Guard/Forward	6–6	180	Sophomore	Albany, Georgia

== Schedule ==
Date time, TV	Opponent	Result	Record	Site (attendance) city, state
Exhibition
11/07/2012; 7:00 pm	at Millsaps	W 94—42		University Center; Hammond, Louisiana
Non conference Regular season
11/11/2012*; 7:00 pm, ESPN3	at No. 23 Wisconsin	L 47–87	0–1	Kohl Center (16,662); Madison, Wisconsin
11/13/2012*; 8:00 pm, ESPN3	at Marquette	L 53–64	0–2	BMO Harris Bradley Center (12,587); Milwaukee, Wisconsin
11/15/2012*; 9:00 pm	at New Mexico State	L 56–81	0–3	Pan American Center (5,107); Las Cruces, New Mexico
11/20/2012*; 8:15 pm	Louisiana College	W 91–49	1–3	University Center (632); Hammond, Louisiana
11/28/2012*; 8:00 pm	at Louisiana Tech	L 62–99	1–4	Thomas Assembly Center (2,537); Ruston, Louisiana
12/01/2012*; 5:00 pm	Southeast Missouri State	L 58–61	1–5	University Center (843); Hammond, Louisiana
12/10/2012*; 7:00 pm	at Louisiana–Monroe	L 61–68 ^{OT}	1–6	Fant–Ewing Coliseum (956); Monroe, Louisiana
12/16/2012*; 1:00 pm	at North Texas	L 40–45	1–7	The Super Pit (2,645); Denton, Texas
12/19/2012*; 6:00 pm, Sun/FSFL/ESPN3	at No. 8 Florida	L 43–82	1–8	O'Connell Center (8,057); Gainesville, Florida
12/29/2012*; 4:00 pm	Spring Hill	W 71–61	2–8	University Center (551); Hammond, Louisiana
Southland Regular season
01/03/2013; 7:15 pm	Oral Roberts	L 72–86	2–9 (0–1)	University Center (831); Hammond, Louisiana
01/05/2013; 4:20 pm	Central Arkansas	W 72–68	3–9 (1–1)	University Center (845); Hammond, Louisiana
01/07/2013; 7:30 pm	at Lamar	W 67–63	4–9 (2–1)	Montagne Center (1,984); Beaumont, Texas
01/12/2013; 4:20 pm	Nicholls State	W 70–65	5–9 (3–1)	University Center (830); Hammond, Louisiana
01/17/2013; 8:00 pm	at Stephen F. Austin	L 40–52	5–10 (3–2)	William R. Johnson Coliseum (3,112); Nacogdoches, Texas
01/19/2013; 3:30 pm	at Northwestern State	L 68–103	5–11 (3–3)	Prather Coliseum (1,203); Natchitoches, Louisiana
01/24/2013; 7:40 pm	Sam Houston State	W 69–65	6–11 (4–3)	University Center (1,397); Hammond, Louisiana
01/26/2013; 4:30 pm	Texas A&M–Corpus Christi	W 67–53	7–11 (5–3)	University Center (1,043); Hammond, Louisiana
01/31/2013; 7:55 pm, ESPN3	at Central Arkansas	W 70–69	8–11 (6–3)	Farris Center (1,878); Conway, Arkansas
02/02/2013; 7:30 pm, FCS	at Oral Roberts	L 59–65	8–12 (6–4)	Mabee Center (6,242); Tulsa, Oklahoma
02/09/2013; 2:00 pm	at Nicholls State	W 73–62	9–12 (7–4)	Stopher Gym (453); Thibodaux, Louisiana
02/14/2013; 7:40 pm	Northwestern State	L 76–79	9–13 (7–5)	University Center (683); Hammond, Louisiana
02/16/2013; 4:45 pm	Stephen F. Austin	W 54–50	10–13 (8–5)	University Center (862); Hammond, Louisiana
02/19/2013; 7:50 pm	at McNeese State	L 58–65	10–14 (8–6)	Burton Coliseum (1,005); Lake Charles, Louisiana
02/23/2013*; 3:00 pm	at Winthrop; BracketBusters	L 52–66	10–15	Winthrop Coliseum (2,410); Rock Hill, South Carolina
02/28/2013; 7:30 pm	at Texas A&M–Corpus Christi	L 64–78	10–16 (8–7)	American Bank Center (1,019); Corpus Christi, Texas
03/02/2013; 4:10 pm	at Sam Houston State	L 45–54	10–17 (8–8)	Bernard Johnson Coliseum (1,031); Huntsville, Texas
03/07/2013; 7:35 pm	McNeese State	W 79–68	11–17 (9–8)	University Center (1,317); Hammond, Louisiana
03/09/2013; 4:30 pm	Lamar	W 86–72	12–17 (10–8)	University Center (1,039); Hammond, Louisiana
2013 Southland Conference men's basketball tournament
03/14/2013; 5:00 pm	vs. McNeese State; Quarterfinals	W 85–65	13–17	Leonard E. Merrell Center (1,480); Katy, Texas
03/15/2013; 5:00 pm, ESPN3	vs. Stephen F. Austin; Semifinals	L 57–68	13–18	Leonard E. Merrell Center (2,341); Katy, Texas
*Non-conference game. ^{#}Rankings from AP Poll. (#) Tournament seedings in parentheses. All times are in Central Time.
