= 2012–13 Nicholls State Colonels men's basketball team =

American college basketball season

2012–13 Nicholls State Colonels men's basketball
- Conference: Southland Conference
- Record: 9–21 (8–10 Southland)
- Head coach: J. P. Piper (9th season)
- Assistant coaches: Rennie Bailey; Terry Parker; Michael Czepil
- Home arena: Stopher Gym

2012–13 Southland Conference men's basketball standings
	Conf.				Overall
Team	W		L	PCT	W		L	PCT
Stephen F. Austin	16	–	2	.889	27	–	5	.844
Northwestern State †	15	–	3	.833	23	–	9	.719
Oral Roberts	13	–	5	.722	20	–	15	.571
Southeastern Louisiana	10	–	8	.556	13	–	18	.419
Sam Houston State	8	–	10	.444	17	–	17	.500
Nicholls State	8	–	10	.444	9	–	21	.300
McNeese State	7	–	11	.389	14	–	17	.452
Central Arkansas	7	–	11	.389	13	–	17	.433
Texas A&M–Corpus Christi*	5	–	13	.278	6	–	23	.207
Lamar	1	–	17	.056	3	–	28	.097
† 2013 Southland tournament winner As of March 27, 2013 *ineligible for Postseason play due to APR Penalties; Rankings from AP Poll

The 2012–13 Nicholls State Colonels men's basketball team represented Nicholls State University during the 2012–13 NCAA Division I men's basketball season. The Colonels, led by ninth year head coach J. P. Piper, played their home games at Stopher Gym and were members of the Southland Conference.

They finished the season 9–21, 8–10 in Southland play to finish in a tie for fifth place. They lost in the first round of the Southland tournament to McNeese State.

== Roster ==
Number	Name	Position	Height	Weight	Year	Hometown
1	Dantrell Thomas	Guard	6–2	200	Junior	Many, Louisiana
2	Lachlan Prest	Forward	6–7	209	Sophomore	Flagstaff Hill, Australia
3	Dominique Vallejo	Guard	6–0	170	Freshman	Baton Rouge, Louisiana
4	Jeremy Smith	Guard	6–3	175	Junior	New Orleans, Louisiana
10	Pedro Maciel	Guard	6–1	180	Junior	São Paulo, Brazil
11	Piers Carroll	Forward	6–6	200	Freshman	Sydney, Australia
12	Zachary West	Guard	5–10	180	Senior	Baton Rouge, Louisiana
13	Travis Julien	Forward	6–7	190	Freshman	Vacherie, Louisiana
14	Ja'Dante Frye	Forward	6–4	180	Freshman	Thibodaux, Louisiana
15	Sam McBeath	Forward	6–7	190	Sophomore	Sydney, Australia
20	Fred Hunter	Guard	6–5	240	Senior	Denton, Texas
21	Shane Rillieux	Guard	6–2	190	Sophomore	New Orleans, Louisiana
22	T.J. Carpenter	Guard	6–4	200	Freshman	Sibley, Louisiana
23	Drew Caillouet	Forward	6–5	180	Freshman	Thibodaux, Louisiana
24	Sterling Bailey	Guard/Forward	6–4	185	Sophomore	Ruston, Louisiana
35	Linden Smith-Hyde	Guard	6–2	170	Senior	Sydney, Australia

== Schedule ==
Date time, TV	Opponent	Result	Record	Site (attendance) city, state
Exhibition
11/13/2012*; 6:30 pm	Mobile	W 73–53		Stopher Gym; Thibodaux, LA
Regular season
11/10/2012*; 4:00 pm	at Vanderbilt	L 65–80	0–1	Memorial Gym (7,655); Nashville, TN
11/16/2012*; 7:00 pm, ESPN3	at No. 14 Missouri	L 54–74	0–2	Mizzou Arena (9,519); Columbia, MO
11/26/2012*; 6:30 pm	New Orleans	W 92–79	1–2	Stopher Gym (650); Thibodaux, LA
12/01/2012*; 11:00 am, BTN	at No. 13 Michigan State	L 39–84	1–3	Breslin Student Events Center (17,797); East Lansing, MI
12/04/2012*; 7:00 pm	at Tulane	L 48–65	1–4	Avron B. Fogelman Arena (1,378); New Orleans, LA
12/12/2012*; 7:00 pm	at New Orleans	L 76–79	1–5	Lakefront Arena (584); New Orleans, LA
12/20/2012*; 9:05 pm	at Utah State; World Vision Classic	L 72–79	1–6	Smith Spectrum (7,731); Logan, UT
12/21/2012*; 6:30 pm	vs. Southern Illinois; World Vision Classic	L 53–65	1–7	Smith Spectrum (785); Logan, UT
12/22/2012*; 6:30 pm	vs. UC Davis; World Vision Classic	L 71–82	1–8	Smith Spectrum (835); Logan, UT
12/29/2012*; 2:00 pm, BTN	at Nebraska	L 59–68	1–9	Bob Devaney Sports Center (11,011); Lincoln, NE
01/03/2013; 7:30 pm	Central Arkansas	W 83–79	2–9 (1–0)	Stopher Gym (550); Thibodaux, LA
01/05/2013; 4:15 pm	Oral Roberts	L 63–76	2–10 (1–1)	Stopher Gym (530); Thibodaux, LA
01/07/2013; 7:30 pm	at McNeese State	W 64–63	3–10 (2–1)	Burton Coliseum (639); Lake Charles, LA
01/12/2013; 4:20 pm	at Southeastern Louisiana	L 65–70	3–11 (2–2)	University Center (830); Hammond, LA
01/17/2013; 7:30 pm, ESPN3	at Northwestern State	W 93–78	4–11 (3–2)	Prather Coliseum (2,832); Natchitoches, LA
01/19/2013; 6:15 pm	at Stephen F. Austin	L 49–72	4–12 (3–3)	William R. Johnson Coliseum (2,811); Nacogdoches, TX
01/24/2013; 7:50 pm	Texas A&M–Corpus Christi	W 69–62	5–12 (4–3)	Stopher Gym (1,530); Thibodaux, LA
01/26/2013; 4:15 pm	Sam Houston State	W 70–67 ^{OT}	6–12 (5–3)	Stopher Gym (682); Thibodaux, LA
01/31/2013; 7:30 pm, FCS	at Oral Roberts	L 78–90	6–13 (5–4)	Mabee Center (3,870); Tulsa, OK
02/02/2013; 4:00 pm	at Central Arkansas	L 76–79	6–14 (5–5)	Farris Center (1,037); Conway, AR
02/09/2013; 2:00 pm	Southeastern Louisiana	L 62–73	6–15 (5–6)	Stopher Gym (453); Thibodaux, LA
02/14/2013; 8:00 pm, ESPN3	Stephen F. Austin	L 51–63	6–16 (5–7)	Stopher Gym (630); Thibodaux, LA
02/16/2013; 4:20 pm	Northwestern State	L 79–84	6–17 (5–8)	Stopher Gym (545); Thibodaux, LA
02/19/2013; 7:30 pm	at Lamar	W 74–63	7–17 (6–8)	Montagne Center (2,078); Beaumont, TX
02/23/2013*; 2:00 pm	at UTSA; BracketBusters	L 58–76	7–18	Convocation Center (861); San Antonio, TX
02/28/2013; 7:45 pm	at Sam Houston State	W 56–53	8–18 (7–8)	Bernard Johnson Coliseum (821); Huntsville, TX
03/02/2013; 7:30 pm	at Texas A&M–Corpus Christi	L 64–68	8–19 (7–9)	American Bank Center (1,333); Corpus Christi, TX
03/07/2013; 7:45 pm	Lamar	W 90–63	9–19 (8–9)	Stopher Gym (679); Thibodaux, LA
03/09/2013; 4:00 pm	McNeese State	L 88–91 ^{2OT}	9–20 (8–10)	Stopher Gym (670); Thibodaux, LA
2013 Southland Conference men's basketball tournament
03/13/2013; 5:00 pm	vs. McNeese State; First Round	L 59–62	9–21	Leonard E. Merrell Center (1,276); Katy, TX
*Non-conference game. ^{#}Rankings from AP Poll. (#) Tournament seedings in parentheses. All times are in Central Time.
