= 2012–13 Texas A&M–Corpus Christi Islanders men's basketball team =

American college basketball season

2012–13 Texas A&M–Corpus Christi Islanders men's basketball
- Conference: Southland Conference
- Record: 6–23 (5–13 Southland)
- Head coach: Willis Wilson (2nd season)
- Assistant coaches: Marty Gross; Mark Dannhoff; Yaphett King
- Home arena: American Bank Center

2012–13 Southland Conference men's basketball standings
	Conf.				Overall
Team	W		L	PCT	W		L	PCT
Stephen F. Austin	16	–	2	.889	27	–	5	.844
Northwestern State †	15	–	3	.833	23	–	9	.719
Oral Roberts	13	–	5	.722	20	–	15	.571
Southeastern Louisiana	10	–	8	.556	13	–	18	.419
Sam Houston State	8	–	10	.444	17	–	17	.500
Nicholls State	8	–	10	.444	9	–	21	.300
McNeese State	7	–	11	.389	14	–	17	.452
Central Arkansas	7	–	11	.389	13	–	17	.433
Texas A&M–Corpus Christi*	5	–	13	.278	6	–	23	.207
Lamar	1	–	17	.056	3	–	28	.097
† 2013 Southland tournament winner As of March 27, 2013 *ineligible for Postseason play due to APR Penalties; Rankings from AP Poll

The 2012–13 Texas A&M–Corpus Christi Islanders men's basketball team represented Texas A&M University–Corpus Christi in the 2012–13 NCAA Division I men's basketball season. This was head coach Willis Wilson's second season at Texas A&M–Corpus Christi. The Islanders were members of the Southland Conference and played their home games at the American Bank Center in Corpus Christi, Texas. They finished the season 6–26, 5–13 in Southland play, to finish in ninth place. Though they would not have qualified for the conference tournament, they were on a post-season ban for low APR scores.

== Media ==
Texas A&M–Corpus Christi men's basketball aired on KKTX with Steven King on the call all season long. Video streaming of all non-televised home games was available at GoIslanders.com.

== Roster ==
2012–13 Texas A&M–Corpus Christi Islanders men's basketball team
Players
Coaches

Pos.	#	Name	Height	Weight	Year	Previous school	Hometown
G	1	Hameed Ali	6 ft 2 in (1.88 m)	170 lb (77 kg)	So	San Leandro	Hayward, CA
G	10	Johnathan Jordan	5 ft 10 in (1.78 m)	165 lb (75 kg)	So	Hightower	Houston, TX
G	12	Jake Kocher	6 ft 1 in (1.85 m)	175 lb (79 kg)	So	St. Michael's	Austin, TX
F/C	23	Nate Maxey	6 ft 11 in (2.11 m)	215 lb (98 kg)	So	Westwind Academy	San Diego, CA
G	24	Kennon Dvorak	6 ft 2 in (1.88 m)	185 lb (84 kg)	RS So	Victoria College	Moulton, TX
G	32	James King	6 ft 0 in (1.83 m)	180 lb (82 kg)	So	Steele	Schertz, TX

Head coach

- Willis Wilson (Rice)

Assistant coach(es)

- Marty Gross (Jacksonville)
- Mark Dannhoff (UW–La Crosse)
- Yaphett King (Cal State Fullerton)

Legend

- (C) Team captain
- (S) Suspended
- (I) Ineligible
- (W) Walk-on
- Injured
- Current redshirt

Roster
Last update: October 6, 2024

== Schedule and results ==
Date time, TV	Opponent	Result	Record	Site (attendance) city, state
Exhibition
November 5, 2012*; 7:30 p.m.	Incarnate Word	L 56–68		American Bank Center (1,239); Corpus Christi, TX
Regular season
November 10, 2012*; 7:00 p.m.	Texas Lutheran	W 60–49	1–0	American Bank Center (1,609); Corpus Christi, TX
November 14, 2012*; 8:00 p.m.	at Denver	L 51–68	1–1	Magness Arena (4,777); Denver, CO
November 17, 2012*; 8:05 p.m.	at Utah State	L 68–77	1–2	Smith Spectrum (9,673); Logan, UT
November 25, 2012*; 2:00 p.m., CSN Houston	Houston	L 75–77	1–3	American Bank Center (1,194); Corpus Christi, TX
November 28, 2012*; 6:00 p.m.	at Toledo	L 68–80	1–4	Savage Arena (3,689); Toledo, OH
December 1, 2012*; 12:00 p.m., BTN	at Iowa	L 59–88	1–5	Carver–Hawkeye Arena (12,628); Iowa City, IA
December 16, 2012*; 4:05 p.m.	at South Alabama	L 69–74	1–6	Mitchell Center (1,764); Mobile, AL
December 18, 2012*; 7:00 p.m., FSSW	at Texas A&M	L 54–66	1–7	Reed Arena (4,648); College Station, TX
December 21, 2012*; 7:00 p.m., CSN Houston	UTSA	L 45–75	1–8	American Bank Center (1,266); Corpus Christi, TX
December 29, 2012; 3:00 p.m.	Stephen F. Austin	L 56–67	1–9 (0–1)	American Bank Center (1,095); Corpus Christi, TX
December 31, 2012*; 2:00 p.m., FSSW+ / FCS Central	at Oklahoma	L 42–72	1–10	Lloyd Noble Center (2,751); Norman, OK
January 4, 2013; 3:30 p.m.	at Sam Houston State	L 57–61	1–11 (0–2)	Bernard Johnson Coliseum (492); Huntsville, TX
January 10, 2013; 8:00 p.m., ESPN3	at McNeese State	L 71–75	1–12 (0–3)	Burton Coliseum (584); Lake Charles, LA
January 12, 2013; 6:20 p.m.	at Lamar	W 62–56	2–12 (1–3)	Montagne Center (2,390); Beaumont, TX
January 17, 2013; 7:30 p.m.	Oral Roberts	L 52–64	2–13 (1–4)	American Bank Center (1,076); Corpus Christi, TX
January 19, 2013; 2:30 p.m.	Central Arkansas	L 67–76	2–14 (1–5)	American Bank Center (1,043); Corpus Christi, TX
January 24, 2013; 7:50 p.m.	at Nicholls State	L 62–69	2–15 (1–6)	Stopher Gym (1,530); Thibodaux, LA
January 26, 2013; 4:30 p.m.	at Southeastern Louisiana	L 53–67	2–16 (1–7)	University Center (1,043); Hammond, LA
February 2, 2013; 1:00 p.m.	Sam Houston State	L 51–55	2–17 (1–8)	Dugan Wellness Center (537); Corpus Christi, TX
February 7, 2013; 7:30 p.m.	Lamar	L 63–67	2–18 (1–9)	American Bank Center (1,428); Corpus Christi, TX
February 9, 2013; 7:00 p.m.	at McNeese State	W 61–58	3–18 (2–9)	American Bank Center (1,873); Corpus Christi, TX
February 14, 2013; 8:00 p.m.	at Central Arkansas	W 75–68	4–18 (3–9)	Farris Center (727); Conway, AR
February 16, 2013; 7:30 p.m., FCS	at Oral Roberts	L 51–56	4–19 (3–10)	Mabee Center (6,203); Tulsa, OK
February 19, 2013; 7:30 p.m.	Northwestern State	L 71–82	4–20 (3–11)	American Bank Center (1,336); Corpus Christi, TX
February 23, 2013*; 1:00 p.m.	Cal State Fullerton; BracketBusters	L 57–63	4–21	American Bank Center (381); Corpus Christi, TX
February 28, 2013; 7:30 p.m.	Southeastern Louisiana	W 78–64	5–21 (4–11)	American Bank Center (1,019); Corpus Christi, TX
March 2, 2013; 7:30 p.m.	Nicholls State	W 68–64	6–21 (5–11)	American Bank Center (1,333); Corpus Christi, TX
March 7, 2013; 7:45 p.m.	at Northwestern State	L 51–66	6–22 (5–12)	Prather Coliseum (2,103); Natchitoches, LA
March 9, 2013; 6:30 p.m.	at Stephen F. Austin	L 49–58	6–23 (5–13)	William R. Johnson Coliseum (2,013); Nacogdoches, TX
*Non-conference game. ^{#}Rankings from AP poll. (#) Tournament seedings in parentheses.
