= 2012–13 Northwestern State Demons basketball team =

American college basketball season

2012–13 Northwestern State Demons men's basketball

Southland Conference tournament champions

NCAA tournament, round of 64
- Conference: Southland Conference
- Record: 23–9 (15–3 Southland)
- Head coach: Mike McConathy (14th season)
- Assistant coaches: Jeff Moore; Bill Lewit; Jacob Spielbauer
- Home arena: Prather Coliseum

2012–13 Southland Conference men's basketball standings
| | Conf. | | | | Overall |
| Team | W | | L | PCT | W | | L | PCT |
|---|---|---|---|---|---|---|---|---|
| Stephen F. Austin | 16 | – | 2 | .889 | 27 | – | 5 | .844 |
| Northwestern State † | 15 | – | 3 | .833 | 23 | – | 9 | .719 |
| Oral Roberts | 13 | – | 5 | .722 | 20 | – | 15 | .571 |
| Southeastern Louisiana | 10 | – | 8 | .556 | 13 | – | 18 | .419 |
| Sam Houston State | 8 | – | 10 | .444 | 17 | – | 17 | .500 |
| Nicholls State | 8 | – | 10 | .444 | 9 | – | 21 | .300 |
| McNeese State | 7 | – | 11 | .389 | 14 | – | 17 | .452 |
| Central Arkansas | 7 | – | 11 | .389 | 13 | – | 17 | .433 |
| Texas A&M–Corpus Christi* | 5 | – | 13 | .278 | 6 | – | 23 | .207 |
| Lamar | 1 | – | 17 | .056 | 3 | – | 28 | .097 |
† 2013 Southland tournament winner As of March 27, 2013 *ineligible for Postseason play due to APR Penalties; Rankings from AP Poll

The 2012–13 Northwestern State Demons basketball team represented Northwestern State University during the 2012–13 NCAA Division I men's basketball season. The Demons, led by 14th year head coach Mike McConathy, played their home games at Prather Coliseum and were members of the Southland Conference. They finished the season 23–9, 15–3 in Southland play to finish in second place. They were champions of the Southland Conference tournament, winning the championship game over Stephen F. Austin, to earn an automatic bid to the 2013 NCAA tournament where they lost in the second round to Florida.

== Roster ==
| Number | Name | Position | Height | Weight | Year | Hometown |
|---|---|---|---|---|---|---|
| 0 | Austin Adams | Forward | 6–7 | 205 | Freshman | Slidell, Louisiana |
| 1 | Dustin Adams | Forward | 6–7 | 205 | Freshman | Slidell, Louisiana |
| 2 | Tyler Washington | Guard | 6–1 | 175 | Junior | Port Allen, Louisiana |
| 3 | Shamir Davis | Guard | 6–0 | 185 | Senior | Shreveport, Louisiana |
| 10 | Patrick Robinson | Forward | 6–5 | 200 | Junior | Baton Rouge, Louisiana |
| 11 | Brandon Williams | Forward | 6–7 | 205 | Freshman | West Palm Beach, Florida |
| 12 | Jalan West | Guard | 5–10 | 175 | Freshman | Bossier City, Louisiana |
| 13 | Matt Killian | Forward | 6–5 | 180 | Freshman | Hornbeck, Louisiana |
| 14 | Paxson Guest | Forward | 6–5 | 185 | Freshman | Bossier City, Louisiana |
| 15 | David Ulak | Forward | 6–5 | 210 | Senior | Livingston, New Jersey |
| 20 | Dadrian Harris | Guard | 6–1 | 185 | Freshman | Castor, Louisiana |
| 22 | Brison White | Guard | 6–0 | 185 | Junior | Wichita, Kansas |
| 32 | DeQuan Hicks | Forward | 6–7 | 230 | Junior | Racine, Wisconsin |
| 33 | James Hulbin | Forward | 6–8 | 232 | Senior | Shreveport, Louisiana |
| 34 | Gary Roberson | Guard/Forward | 6–4 | 240 | Senior | Natchitoches, Louisiana |
| 35 | O.J. Evans | Center | 6–9 | 200 | Senior | Mansfield, Louisiana |
| 40 | Marvin Frazier | Center | 6–9 | 200 | Sophomore | Zwolle, Louisiana |
| 44 | Gary Stewart | Guard | 6–4 | 197 | Junior | Vidalia, Louisiana |

== Schedule ==
| Date time, TV | Rank^{#} | Opponent^{#} | Result | Record | Site (attendance) city, state |
Non-conference regular season
| 11/09/2012*; 8:00 pm | | East Texas Baptist | W 118–77 | 1–0 | Prather Coliseum (2,112); Natchitoches, LA |
| 11/12/2012*; 6:00 pm | | at Campbell | W 71–67 | 2–0 | John W. Pope, Jr. Convocation Center (1,583); Buies Creek, NC |
| 11/17/2012*; 2:00 pm | | Hannibal—LaGrange | W 92–43 | 3–0 | Prather Coliseum (745); Natchitoches, LA |
| 11/20/2012*; 7:00 pm | | at LSU | L 95–102 | 3–1 | Pete Maravich Assembly Center (7,018); Baton Rouge, LA |
| 11/26/2012*; 8:00 pm, FS Southwest | | at Texas A&M | L 65–78 | 3–2 | Reed Arena (4,289); College Station, TX |
| 11/30/2012*; 7:00 pm | | at Oklahoma | L 65–69 | 3–3 | Lloyd Noble Center (8,915); Norman, OK |
| 12/04/2012*; 7:30 pm | | Louisiana Tech | W 89–83 | 4–3 | Prather Coliseum (2,703); Natchitoches, LA |
| 12/15/2012*; 2:00 pm | | Missouri Valley | W 95–78 | 5–3 | Prather Coliseum (715); Natchitoches, LA |
| 12/29/2012*; 7:00 pm, ESPN3 | | at Arkansas | L 61–79 | 5–4 | Bud Walton Arena (13,472); Fayetteville, AR |
| 12/31/2012*; 2:00 pm | | LeTourneau | W 102–52 | 6–4 | Prather Coliseum (515); Natchitoches, LA |
| 01/03/2013; 7:30 pm | | McNeese State | W 78–63 | 7–4 (1–0) | Prather Coliseum (1,922); Natchitoches, LA |
| 01/05/2013; 3:20 pm | | Lamar | W 86–58 | 8–4 (2–0) | Prather Coliseum (1,203); Natchitoches, LA |
| 01/07/2013; 7:45 pm | | at Sam Houston State | W 73–64 | 9–4 (3–0) | Bernard Johnson Coliseum (711); Huntsville, TX |
| 01/10/2013; 7:30 pm, FCS | | at Oral Roberts | L 74–80 | 9–5 (3–1) | Mabee Center (3,137); Tulsa, OK |
| 01/12/2013; 4:00 pm | | at Central Arkansas | W 100–88 | 10–5 (4–1) | Farris Center (1,172); Conway, AR |
| 01/17/2013; 7:30 pm, ESPN3 | | Nicholls State | L 78–93 | 10–6 (4–2) | Prather Coliseum (2,832); Natchitoches, LA |
| 01/19/2013; 3:30 pm | | Southeastern Louisiana | W 103–68 | 11–6 (5–2) | Prather Coliseum (1,203); Natchitoches, LA |
| 01/26/2013; 3:00 pm | | Stephen F. Austin | W 61–57 | 12–6 (6–2) | Prather Coliseum (2,533); Natchitoches, LA |
| 01/31/2013; 7:50 pm | | at Lamar | W 85–63 | 13–6 (7–2) | Montagne Center (2,703); Beaumont, TX |
| 02/03/2013; 4:30 pm | | at McNeese State | W 86–74 | 14–6 (8–2) | Sudduth Coliseum (378); Lake Charles, LA |
| 02/07/2013; 7:30 pm | | Oral Roberts | W 85–73 | 15–6 (9–2) | Prather Coliseum (2,933); Natchitoches, LA |
| 02/09/2013; 3:00 pm | | Central Arkansas | W 93–73 | 16–6 (10–2) | Prather Coliseum (1,122); Natchitoches, LA |
| 02/14/2013; 7:40 pm | | at Southeastern Louisiana | W 79–76 | 17–6 (11–2) | University Center (683); Hammond, LA |
| 02/16/2013; 4:20 pm | | at Nicholls State | W 84–79 | 18–6 (12–2) | Stopher Gym (545); Thibodaux, LA |
| 02/19/2013; 7:30 pm | | at Texas A&M–Corpus Christi | W 82–71 | 19–6 (13–2) | American Bank Center (1,336); Corpus Christi, TX |
| 02/23/2013*; 2:00 pm, ESPN3 | | at Niagara; BracketBusters | L 76–92 | 19–7 | Gallagher Center (1,704); Lewiston, NY |
| 03/02/2013; 6:00 pm | | at Stephen F. Austin | L 63–64 | 19–8 (13–3) | William R. Johnson Coliseum (4,836); Nacogdoches, TX |
| 03/07/2013; 7:45 pm | | Texas A&M–Corpus Christi | W 66–51 | 20–8 (14–3) | Prather Coliseum (2,103); Natchitoches, LA |
| 03/09/2013; 3:00 pm | | Sam Houston State | W 84–73 | 21–8 (15–3) | Prather Coliseum (2,603); Natchitoches, LA |
2013 Southland Conference tournament
| 03/15/2013; 7:30 pm, ESPN3 | | vs. Sam Houston State; Semifinals | W 55–52 | 22–8 | Leonard E. Merrell Center (2,341); Katy, TX |
| 03/16/2013; 7:30 pm, ESPN2 | | vs. Stephen F. Austin; Championship Game | W 68–66 | 23–8 | Leonard E. Merrell Center (3,124); Katy, TX |
2013 NCAA tournament
| 03/22/2013*; 6:40 pm, truTV | No. (14 S) | vs. No. 14 (3 S) Florida; Second round | L 47–79 | 23–9 | Frank Erwin Center (13,825); Austin, TX |
*Non-conference game. ^{#}Rankings from AP Poll. (#) Tournament seedings in parentheses. All times are in Central Time. (#) during NCAA Tournament is Seed with Region S=South.
