= 2012–13 Oral Roberts Golden Eagles men's basketball team =

American college basketball season

2012–13 Oral Roberts Golden Eagles men's basketball

CIT, Quarterfinals
- Conference: Southland Conference
- Record: 20–15 (13–5 Southland)
- Head coach: Scott Sutton (14th season)
- Assistant coaches: Kyan Brown; Wade Mason; Sean Sutton
- Home arena: Mabee Center

2012–13 Southland Conference men's basketball standings
| | Conf. | | | | Overall |
| Team | W | | L | PCT | W | | L | PCT |
|---|---|---|---|---|---|---|---|---|
| Stephen F. Austin | 16 | – | 2 | .889 | 27 | – | 5 | .844 |
| Northwestern State † | 15 | – | 3 | .833 | 23 | – | 9 | .719 |
| Oral Roberts | 13 | – | 5 | .722 | 20 | – | 15 | .571 |
| Southeastern Louisiana | 10 | – | 8 | .556 | 13 | – | 18 | .419 |
| Sam Houston State | 8 | – | 10 | .444 | 17 | – | 17 | .500 |
| Nicholls State | 8 | – | 10 | .444 | 9 | – | 21 | .300 |
| McNeese State | 7 | – | 11 | .389 | 14 | – | 17 | .452 |
| Central Arkansas | 7 | – | 11 | .389 | 13 | – | 17 | .433 |
| Texas A&M–Corpus Christi* | 5 | – | 13 | .278 | 6 | – | 23 | .207 |
| Lamar | 1 | – | 17 | .056 | 3 | – | 28 | .097 |
† 2013 Southland tournament winner As of March 27, 2013 *ineligible for Postseason play due to APR Penalties; Rankings from AP Poll

The 2012–13 Oral Roberts Golden Eagles men's basketball team represented Oral Roberts University during the 2012–13 NCAA Division I men's basketball season. The Golden Eagles, led by 14th year head coach Scott Sutton, played their home games at the Mabee Center and were first year members of the Southland Conference. They finished the season 20–15, 13–5 in Southland play to finish in third place. They lost in the quarterfinals of the Southland tournament to Sam Houston State. They were invited to the 2013 CIT where they defeated Texas–Arlington and UC Irvine to advance to the quarterfinals where they lost to Weber State.

== Roster ==
| Number | Name | Position | Height | Weight | Year | Hometown |
|---|---|---|---|---|---|---|
| 0 | Caleb Tennehill | Guard | 5–10 | 186 | Freshman | Nashville, Tennessee |
| 3 | Corbin Byford | Forward | 6–6 | 210 | Freshman | Velma Alma, Oklahoma |
| 5 | Brandon Conley | Forward | 6–5 | 221 | Freshman | Ft. Worth, Texas |
| 11 | Shawn Glover | Guard/Forward | 6–7 | 195 | Junior | Dallas, TX |
| 12 | D.J. Jackson | Guard | 5–11 | 175 | Freshman | Kansas City, Missouri |
| 13 | Warren Niles | Guard | 6–5 | 195 | Senior | Cincinnati, Ohio |
| 14 | Jake Lliteras | Guard | 6–5 | 195 | Sophomore | Hillsborough, North Carolina |
| 22 | Steven Roundtree | Forward | 6–8 | 190 | Junior | Jacksonville, Florida |
| 23 | Korey Billbury | Guard | 6–2 | 185 | Freshman | Tulsa, Oklahoma |
| 25 | P.J. Purnell | Guard | 6–2 | 175 | Sophomore | Silver Spring, Maryland |
| 31 | Jorden Kaufman | Forward/Center | 6–11 | 245 | Freshman | Andover, Kansas |
| 32 | Damen Bell-Holter | Forward/Center | 6–9 | 245 | Senior | Hydaburg, Alaska |
| 35 | Mikey Manghum | Guard | 6–2 | 185 | Junior | Derby, England |
| | Obi Emegano | Guard | 6–4 | 215 | Sophomore | Edmond, Oklahoma |

== Schedule ==
| Date time, TV | Opponent | Result | Record | Site (attendance) city, state |
Exhibition
| 11/01/2012*; 7:00 pm | Missouri Southern | W 83–66 | | Mabee Center (1,258); Tulsa, OK |
| 11/05/2012*; 7:00 pm | Oklahoma Wesleyan | W 92–69 | | Mabee Center (1,954); Tulsa, OK |
Regular season
| 11/09/2012*; 8:00 pm | at UTEP | L 49–69 | 0–1 | Don Haskins Center (8,564); El Paso, TX |
| 11/14/2012*; 7:00 pm | St. Gregory's | W 90–41 | 1–1 | Mabee Center (2,482); Tulsa, OK |
| 11/19/2012*; 9:00 pm | at Pacific | W 69–67 | 2–1 | Alex G. Spanos Center (1,430); Stockton, CA |
| 11/22/2012*; 8:00 pm, CBSSN | vs. Loyola Marymount; Great Alaska Shootout First Round | W 75–66 | 3–1 | Sullivan Arena (4,141); Anchorage, AK |
| 11/23/2012*; 0:30 am, CBSSN | vs. Charlotte; Great Alaska Shootout | L 58–72 | 3–2 | Sullivan Arena (4,724); Anchorage, AK |
| 11/24/2012*; 9:00 pm, CBSSN | vs. Belmont; Great Alaska Shootout | L 67–70 | 3–3 | Sullivan Arena (4,452); Anchorage, AK |
| 11/28/2012*; 7:00 pm, ESPN3 | Oklahoma | L 62–63 | 3–4 | Mabee Center (7,219); Tulsa, OK |
| 12/01/2012*; 4:30 pm | at Missouri State | W 72–52 | 4–4 | JQH Arena (6,475); Springfield, MO |
| 12/05/2012*; 7:00 pm | at Texas State | W 86–77 | 5–4 | Strahan Coliseum (1,609); San Marcos, TX |
| 12/18/2012*; 8:00 pm, Pac-12 Network | at No. 4 Arizona | L 64–89 | 5–5 | McKale Center (13,067); Tucson, AZ |
| 12/22/2012*; 2:00 pm, KGEB/FCS | Tulsa | L 68–72 | 5–6 | Mabee Center (6,020); Tulsa, OK |
| 12/28/2012*; 7:00 pm, CSS | at Memphis | L 57–72 | 5–7 | FedExForum (16,410); Memphis, TN |
| 01/03/2013; 7:15 pm | at Southeastern Louisiana | W 86–72 | 6–7 (1–0) | University Center (831); Hammond, LA |
| 01/05/2013; 4:15 pm | at Nicholls State | W 76–63 | 7–7 (2–0) | Stopher Gym (530); Thibodaux, LA |
| 01/10/2013; 7:30 pm, KGEB/FCS | Northwestern State | W 80–74 | 8–7 (3–0) | Mabee Center (3,137); Tulsa, OK |
| 01/12/2013; 7:30 pm, KGEB/FCS | Stephen F. Austin | L 50–61 | 8–8 (3–1) | Mabee Center (3,565); Tulsa, OK |
| 01/17/2013; 7:30 pm | at Texas A&M–Corpus Christi | W 64–52 | 9–8 (4–1) | American Bank Center (1,076); Corpus Christi, TX |
| 01/19/2013; 3:45 pm | at Sam Houston State | W 65–61 ^{OT} | 10–8 (5–1) | Bernard Johnson Coliseum (1,261); Huntsville, TX |
| 01/24/2013; 7:30 pm, ESPN3 | Lamar | W 91–74 | 11–8 (6–1) | Mabee Center (3,444); Tulsa, OK |
| 01/26/2013; 7:30 pm, KGEB/FCS | McNeese State | W 75–54 | 12–8 (7–1) | Mabee Center (3,960); Tulsa, OK |
| 01/31/2013; 7:30 pm, KGEB/FCS | Nicholls State | W 90–78 | 13–8 (8–1) | Mabee Center (3,870); Tulsa, OK |
| 02/02/2013; 7:30 pm, KGEB/FCS | Southeastern Louisiana | W 65–59 | 14–8 (9–1) | Mabee Center (6,242); Tulsa, OK |
| 02/07/2013; 7:30 pm | at Northwestern State | L 73–85 | 14–9 (9–2) | Prather Coliseum (2,933); Natchitoches, LA |
| 02/09/2013; 6:00 pm | at Stephen F. Austin | L 67–77 | 14–10 (9–3) | William R. Johnson Coliseum (4,377); Nacogdoches, TX |
| 02/14/2013; 7:30 pm, KGEB/FCS | Sam Houston State | W 74–64 | 15–10 (10–3) | Mabee Center (3,294); Tulsa, OK |
| 02/16/2013; 7:30 pm, KGEB/FCS | Texas A&M–Corpus Christi | W 56–51 | 16–10 (11–3) | Mabee Center (6,203); Tulsa, OK |
| 02/19/2013; 7:30 pm, KGEB/FCS | Central Arkansas | W 94–65 | 17–10 (12–3) | Mabee Center (3,559); Tulsa, OK |
| 02/23/2013*; 7:30 pm | Weber State; BracketBusters | L 66–70 | 17–11 | Mabee Center (6,890); Tulsa, OK |
| 02/28/2013; 7:30 pm | at McNeese State | L 54–56 | 17–12 (12–4) | Burton Coliseum (1,192); Lake Charles, LA |
| 03/02/2013; 6:00 pm | at Lamar | W 68–50 | 18–12 (13–4) | Montagne Center (6,059); Beaumont, TX |
| 03/09/2013; 4:30 pm | at Central Arkansas | L 84–86 ^{OT} | 18–13 (13–5) | Farris Center (1,858); Conway, AR |
2013 Southland Conference men's basketball tournament
| 03/14/2013; 7:30 pm | vs. Sam Houston State; Quarterfinals | L 55–58 | 18–14 | Leonard E. Merrell Center (1,480); Katy, TX |
2013 CIT
| 03/20/2013*; 7:30 pm | at Texas–Arlington; First Round | W 84–76 | 19–14 | College Park Center (1,627); Arlington, TX |
| 03/25/2013*; 7:00 pm | UC Irvine; Second Round | W 76–62 | 20–14 | Mabee Center (2,142); Tulsa, OK |
| 03/27/2013*; 8:00 pm | at Weber State; Quarterfinals | L 74–83 | 20–15 | Dee Events Center (6,638); Ogden, UT |
*Non-conference game. ^{#}Rankings from AP Poll. (#) Tournament seedings in parentheses. All times are in Central Time.
