= 2012–13 Central Arkansas Bears basketball team =

American college basketball season

2012–13 Central Arkansas Bears basketball
- Conference: Southland Conference
- Record: 13–17 (7–11 Southland)
- Head coach: Corliss Williamson (3rd season)
- Assistant coaches: Clarence Finley; Jonathan Jackson; Anthony Walker
- Home arena: Farris Center

2012–13 Southland Conference men's basketball standings
	Conf.				Overall
Team	W		L	PCT	W		L	PCT
Stephen F. Austin	16	–	2	.889	27	–	5	.844
Northwestern State †	15	–	3	.833	23	–	9	.719
Oral Roberts	13	–	5	.722	20	–	15	.571
Southeastern Louisiana	10	–	8	.556	13	–	18	.419
Sam Houston State	8	–	10	.444	17	–	17	.500
Nicholls State	8	–	10	.444	9	–	21	.300
McNeese State	7	–	11	.389	14	–	17	.452
Central Arkansas	7	–	11	.389	13	–	17	.433
Texas A&M–Corpus Christi*	5	–	13	.278	6	–	23	.207
Lamar	1	–	17	.056	3	–	28	.097
† 2013 Southland tournament winner As of March 27, 2013 *ineligible for Postseason play due to APR Penalties; Rankings from AP Poll

The 2012–13 Central Arkansas Bears basketball team represented the University of Central Arkansas during the 2012–13 NCAA Division I men's basketball season. The Bears, led by third year head coach Corliss Williamson, played their home games at the Farris Center and were members of the Southland Conference. They finished the season 13–17, 7–11 in Southland play to finish in a tie for seventh place.

The Bears lost in the first round of the Southland tournament to Sam Houston State.

== Roster ==
Number	Name	Position	Height	Weight	Year	Hometown
0	Robert Crawford	Guard	6–5	210	Senior	Broken Arrow, Oklahoma
1	Jarvis Garner	Forward	6–7	210	Senior	Conway, Arkansas
2	LaQuentin Miles	Guard	6–5	190	Junior	Jacksonville, Arkansas
3	DeShone McClure	Guard	6–3	175	Junior	Jacksonville, Arkansas
4	Lenell Brown	Guard	5–11	155	Sophomore	Pine Bluff, Arkansas
5	Ryan Williams	Guard	6–3	185	Junior	Pine Bluff, Arkansas
15	Jordan Harks	Forward	6–8	210	Junior	Lombard, Illinois
20	Zach Padgett	Guard	6–5	185	Freshman	Port Allen, Louisiana
21	Alexander Ridley	Center	6–11	215	Freshman	McKinney, Texas
23	Oliver Wells	Guard	6–0	185	Sophomore	Cedar Hill, Texas
25	Daouda Berete	Guard	6–4	175	Freshman	Conakry, Guinea
32	Terrell Brown	Forward	6–5	235	Freshman	Jacksonville, Arkansas
40	Sean Young	Center	6–9	200	Freshman	Bixby, Oklahoma
42	Anthony Borden	Center	6–10	240	Senior	West Memphis, Arkansas

== Schedule ==
Date time, TV	Opponent	Result	Record	Site (attendance) city, state
Regular season
11/10/2012*; 7:30 pm, P12N	at Arizona State	L 64–79	0–1	Wells Fargo Arena (4,286); Tempe, AZ
11/13/2012*; 7:00 pm	Hendrix	W 108–65	1–1	Farris Center (1,921); Conway, AR
11/21/2012*; 7:00 pm	Arkansas State	L 72–73	1–2	Farris Center (4,127); Conway, AR
11/24/2012*; 7:00 pm	Sacramento State	L 68–71	1–3	Farris Center (729); Conway, AR
11/28/2012*; 7:00 pm	at Eastern Illinois	W 74–72	2–3	Lantz Arena (811); Charleston, IL
12/05/2012*; 7:00 pm	Tennessee–Martin	W 87–86	3–3	Farris Center (1,472); Conway, AR
12/08/2012*; 5:30 pm	at Southeast Missouri State	W 88–85	4–3	Show Me Center (2,384); Cape Girardeau, MO
12/16/2012*; 3:00 pm, FSOK	at No. 24 Oklahoma State	L 63–91	4–4	Gallagher-Iba Arena (5,538); Stillwater, OK
12/22/2012*; 2:00 pm	vs. Mississippi State	L 72–79	4–5	Mississippi Coliseum (2,217); Jackson, MS
12/31/2012*; 3:00 pm	Central Baptist	W 107–82	5–5	Farris Center (412); Conway, AR
01/03/2013; 7:30 pm	at Nicholls State	L 79–83	5–6 (0–1)	Stopher Gym (550); Thibodaux, LA
01/05/2013; 4:20 pm	at Southeastern Louisiana	L 68–72	5–7 (0–2)	University Center (845); Hammond, LA
01/10/2013; 8:00 pm	Stephen F. Austin	L 69–77	5–8 (0–3)	Farris Center (1,672); Conway, AR
01/12/2013; 4:00 pm	Northwestern State	L 88–100	5–9 (0–4)	Farris Center (1,172); Conway, AR
01/17/2013; 8:00 pm, CSNHOU	at Sam Houston State	L 52–63	5–10 (0–5)	Bernard Johnson Coliseum (1,231); Huntsville, TX
01/19/2013; 2:30 pm	at Texas A&M–Corpus Christi	W 76–67	6–10 (1–5)	American Bank Center (1,043); Corpus Christi, TX
01/24/2013; 7:30 pm	McNeese State	W 103–98 ^{3OT}	7–10 (2–5)	Farris Center (2,712); Conway, AR
01/26/2013; 4:45 pm	Lamar	W 88–59	8–10 (3–5)	Farris Center (2,095); Conway, AR
01/31/2013; 7:55 pm, ESPN3	Southeastern Louisiana	L 69–70	8–11 (3–6)	Farris Center (1,878); Conway, AR
02/02/2013; 4:00 pm	Nicholls State	W 79–76	9–11 (4–6)	Farris Center (1,037); Conway, AR
02/07/2013; 8:00 pm	at Stephen F. Austin	L 36–72	9–12 (4–7)	William R. Johnson Coliseum (2,757); Nacogdoches, TX
02/09/2013; 3:00 pm	at Northwestern State	L 73–93	9–13 (4–8)	Prather Coliseum (1,122); Natchitoches, LA
02/14/2013; 8:00 pm	Texas A&M–Corpus Christi	L 68–75	9–14 (4–9)	Farris Center (727); Conway, AR
02/16/2013; 4:15 pm	Sam Houston State	L 75–80	9–15 (4–10)	Farris Center (1,067); Conway, AR
02/19/2013; 7:30 pm	at Oral Roberts	L 65–94	9–16 (4–11)	Mabee Center (3,559); Tulsa, OK
02/23/2013*; 4:30 pm	SIU Edwardsville; BracketBusters	W 80–78	10–16	Farris Center (1,889); Conway, AR
02/28/2013; 7:30 pm, ESPN3	at Lamar	W 106–99 ^{2OT}	11–16 (5–11)	Montagne Center (2,081); Beaumont, TX
03/02/2013; 4:30 pm	at McNeese State	W 68–67	12–16 (6–11)	Burton Coliseum (2,231); Lake Charles, LA
03/09/2013; 4:30 pm	Oral Roberts	W 86–84 ^{OT}	13–16 (7–11)	Farris Center (1,858); Conway, AR
2013 Southland Conference men's basketball tournament
03/13/2013; 7:30 pm	vs. Sam Houston State; First Round	L 63–69	13–17	Leonard E. Merrell Center (1,276); Katy, TX
*Non-conference game. ^{#}Rankings from AP Poll. (#) Tournament seedings in parentheses. All times are in Central Time.
