= 2012–13 Lamar Cardinals basketball team =

American college basketball season

2012–13 Lamar Cardinals men's basketball
- Conference: Southland Conference
- Record: 3–28 (1–17 Southland)
- Head coach: Pat Knight (2nd season)
- Assistant coaches: Kermit Holmes; Clif Carroll; Sherron Wilkerson
- Home arena: Montagne Center

2012–13 Southland Conference men's basketball standings
	Conf.				Overall
Team	W		L	PCT	W		L	PCT
Stephen F. Austin	16	–	2	.889	27	–	5	.844
Northwestern State †	15	–	3	.833	23	–	9	.719
Oral Roberts	13	–	5	.722	20	–	15	.571
Southeastern Louisiana	10	–	8	.556	13	–	18	.419
Sam Houston State	8	–	10	.444	17	–	17	.500
Nicholls State	8	–	10	.444	9	–	21	.300
McNeese State	7	–	11	.389	14	–	17	.452
Central Arkansas	7	–	11	.389	13	–	17	.433
Texas A&M–Corpus Christi*	5	–	13	.278	6	–	23	.207
Lamar	1	–	17	.056	3	–	28	.097
† 2013 Southland tournament winner As of March 27, 2013 *ineligible for Postseason play due to APR Penalties; Rankings from AP Poll

The 2012–13 Lamar Cardinals basketball team represented Lamar University during the 2012–13 NCAA Division I men's basketball season. The Cardinals, led by second year head coach Pat Knight, played their home games at the Montagne Center and were members of the Southland Conference. They finished the season 3–28, 1–17 in Southland play to finish in last place. A year after being Southland tournament champions and playing in the NCAA Tournament, the Cardinals failed to qualify for the 2013 Southland tournament.

== Roster ==
Number	Name	Position	Height	Weight	Year	Hometown
1	Keilan Blanks	Guard	5–9	160	Freshman	Spring Hill, Tennessee
2	Nikko Acosta	Forward	6–9	220	Senior	New London, Connecticut
3	Donnell Minton	Guard	6–0	145	Freshman	Indianapolis, Indiana
4	Matt Hancock	Guard	6–4	200	Freshman	Melbourne, Australia
5	Hondo Webb	Guard	6–2	225	Sophomore	Denison, Texas
10	Rhon Mitchell	Forward	6–5	180	Freshman	Inglewood, California
12	Brian Curran	Guard	6–2	180	Freshman	Draper, Utah
21	Brennan Doty	Guard	6–3	170	Sophomore	Port Neches, Texas
22	Donley Minor	Guard	6–1	175	Senior	Los Angeles, California
24	D.J. Muepo	Forward	6–6	240	Freshman	Los Angeles, California
33	Osas Ebomwonyi	Forward	6–11	220	Junior	Pflugerville, Texas
34	Amos Wilson	Forward	6–5	205	Junior	Allen, Texas
35	Stan Brown	Forward	6–8	225	Senior	Dolton, Illinois
50	Sebastian Norman	Forward	6–9	235	Sophomore	Uppsala, Sweden

== Schedule ==
Date time, TV	Opponent	Result	Record	Site (attendance) city, state
Exhibition
11/03/2012*; 1:00 pm	McMurry	W 74–66		Montagne Center (1,860); Beaumont, TX
11/05/2012*; 7:00 pm	Northwood (TX)	W 87–76		Montagne Center (N/A); Beaumont, TX
Regular season
11/12/2012*; 7:00 pm, ESPN3	at Kansas State; NIT Season Tip-Off First Round	L 55–79	0–1	Bramlage Coliseum (12,068); Manhattan, KS
11/13/2012*; 6:00 pm	vs. North Texas; NIT Season Tip-Off	L 59–74	0–2	Manhattan, KS (12,006); Bramlage Center
11/17/2012*; 6:30 pm	at Charlotte	L 49–70	0–3	Dale F. Halton Arena (4,620); Charlotte, NC
11/19/2012*; 6:00 pm	at Virginia; NIT Season Tip-Off	L 44–63	0–4	John Paul Jones Arena (1,444); Charlottesville, VA
11/20/2012*; 3:30 pm	vs. IUPUI; NIT Season Tip-Off	W 86–82	1–4	John Paul Jones Arena (1,745); Charlottesville, VA
11/25/2012*; 2:05 pm	at Arkansas State	L 53–93	1–5	Convocation Center (1,927); Jonesboro, AR
11/27/2012*; 7:00 pm	at Alabama	L 47–75	1–6	Coleman Coliseum (10,436); Tuscaloosa, AL
12/04/2012*; 6:30 pm, BTN	at Purdue	L 39–72	1–7	Mackey Arena (12,721); West Lafayette, IN
12/11/2012*; 7:00 pm	at Louisiana–Lafayette	L 60–77	1–8	Cajundome (2,059); Lafayette, LA
12/12/2012*; 8:30 pm, FSSW+	at Baylor	L 68–85	1–9	Ferrell Center (5,688); Waco, TX
12/15/2012*; 7:00 pm, Broncs Live	at Texas–Pan American	L 70–75	1–10	UTPA Fieldhouse (494); Edinburg, TX
12/29/2012*; 2:00 pm	Long Island	W 81–80	2–10	Montagne Center (2,052); Beaumont, TX
01/03/2013; 8:00 pm, CSN Houston	at Stephen F. Austin	L 43–79	2–11 (0–1)	William R. Johnson Coliseum (2,107); Nacogdoches, TX
01/05/2013; 3:20 pm	at Northwestern State	L 58–86	2–12 (0–2)	Prather Coliseum (1,203); Natchitoches, LA
01/07/2013; 7:30 pm	Southeastern Louisiana	L 63–67	2–13 (0–3)	Montagne Center (1,984); Beaumont, TX
01/10/2013; 7:45 pm	Sam Houston State	L 57–68	2–14 (0–4)	Montagne Center (2,246); Beaumont, TX
01/12/2013; 6:20 pm	Texas A&M–Corpus Christi	L 56–62	2–15 (0–5)	Montagne Center (2,390); Beaumont, TX
01/19/2013; 3:00 pm	at McNeese State	L 50–74	2–16 (0–6)	Burton Coliseum (1,524); Lake Charles, LA
01/24/2013; 7:30 pm, ESPN3	at Oral Roberts	L 74–91	2–17 (0–7)	Mabee Center (3,444); Tulsa, OK
01/26/2013; 4:45 pm	at Central Arkansas	L 59–88	2–18 (0–8)	Farris Center (2,095); Conway, AR
01/31/2013; 7:50 pm	Northwestern State	L 63–85	2–19 (0–9)	Montagne Center (2,703); Beaumont, TX
02/02/2013; 6:30 pm	Stephen F. Austin	L 51–65	2–20 (0–10)	Montagne Center (2,790); Beaumont, TX
02/07/2013; 7:30 pm	at Texas A&M–Corpus Christi	W 67–63	3–20 (1–10)	American Bank Center (1,428); Corpus Christi, TX
02/09/2013; 3:45 pm	at Sam Houston State	L 40–78	3–21 (1–11)	Bernard Johnson Coliseum (1,171); Huntsville, TX
02/16/2013; 6:30 pm, CSN Houston	McNeese State	L 62–69	3–22 (1–12)	Montagne Center (2,837); Beaumont, TX
02/19/2013; 7:30 pm	Nicholls State	L 63–74	3–23 (1–13)	Montagne Center (2,078); Beaumont, TX
02/23/2013*; 6:00 pm	Texas State; BracketBusters	L 61–74	3–24	Montagne Center (2,079); Beaumont, TX
02/28/2013; 7:30 pm, ESPN3	Central Arkansas	L 99–106 ^{2OT}	3–25 (1–14)	Montagne Center (2,081); Beaumont, TX
03/02/2013; 6:00 pm	Oral Roberts	L 50–68	3–26 (1–15)	Montagne Center (6,059); Beaumont, TX
03/07/2013; 7:45 pm	at Nicholls State	L 63–90	3–27 (1–16)	Stopher Gym (679); Thibodaux, LA
03/09/2013; 4:30 pm	at Southeastern Louisiana	L 72–86	3–28 (1–17)	University Center (1,039); Hammond, LA
*Non-conference game. ^{#}Rankings from AP Poll. (#) Tournament seedings in parentheses. All times are in Central Time.
