= 2012–13 Sam Houston State Bearkats men's basketball team =

American college basketball season

2012–13 Sam Houston State Bearkats men's basketball
- Conference: Southland Conference
- Record: 17–17 (8–10 Southland)
- Head coach: Jason Hooten (3rd season)
- Assistant coaches: Chris Mudge (3rd season); Terrence Rencher (1st season); Will Weaver (3rd season)
- Home arena: Bernard Johnson Coliseum

2012–13 Southland Conference men's basketball standings
	Conf.				Overall
Team	W		L	PCT	W		L	PCT
Stephen F. Austin	16	–	2	.889	27	–	5	.844
Northwestern State †	15	–	3	.833	23	–	9	.719
Oral Roberts	13	–	5	.722	20	–	15	.571
Southeastern Louisiana	10	–	8	.556	13	–	18	.419
Sam Houston State	8	–	10	.444	17	–	17	.500
Nicholls State	8	–	10	.444	9	–	21	.300
McNeese State	7	–	11	.389	14	–	17	.452
Central Arkansas	7	–	11	.389	13	–	17	.433
Texas A&M–Corpus Christi*	5	–	13	.278	6	–	23	.207
Lamar	1	–	17	.056	3	–	28	.097
† 2013 Southland tournament winner As of March 27, 2013 *ineligible for Postseason play due to APR Penalties; Rankings from AP Poll

The 2012–13 Sam Houston State Bearkats men's basketball team represented Sam Houston State University during the 2012–13 NCAA Division I men's basketball season. The Bearkats, led by third year head coach Jason Hooten, played their home games at the Bernard Johnson Coliseum and were members of the Southland Conference. They finished the season 17–17, 8–10 in Southland play to in a tie for fifth place. They advanced to the semifinals of the Southland tournament where they lost to Northwestern State.

== Roster ==
Number	Name	Position	Height	Weight	Year	Hometown
1	Darius Gatson	Guard	5–11	175	Senior	Houston, Texas
2	Marquel McKinney	Guard	6–3	206	Sophomore	Houston, Texas
4	Erik Williams	Forward	6–7	215	Junior	Houston, Texas
5	Aaron Harwell	Guard	5–11	160	Junior	Houston, Texas
10	Jeremy McKay	Guard	5–10	170	Junior	Headland, Alabama
11	DeMarcus Gatlin	Guard	6–4	190	Junior	Houston, Texas
20	James Thomas	Forward	6–5	215	Junior	Duncanville, Texas
21	Paul Baxter	Guard	6–1	180	Freshman	Austin, Texas
24	Terrance Motley	Forward	6–7	240	Junior	Phoenix, Arizona
32	Will Bond	Guard	6–4	190	Junior	Phoenix, Arizona
33	Nathaniel Mason	Forward	6–4	185	Junior	Cincinnati, Ohio
35	Michael Holyfield	Center	6–11	255	Sophomore	Albuquerque, New Mexico
44	Dakariai Henderson	Guard	6–2	170	Freshman	Pearland, Texas

== Schedule ==
Date time, TV	Opponent	Result	Record	Site (attendance) city, state
Regular season
11/09/2012*; 7:00 pm	at Arkansas	L 68–73	0–1	Bud Walton Arena (12,253); Fayetteville, AR
11/13/2012*; 7:00 pm, BSN	Hardin–Simmons	W 82–31	1–1	Bernard Johnson Coliseum (1,175); Huntsville, TX
11/15/2012*; 6:00 pm, BTN	at No. 1 Indiana; Legends Classic	L 45–99	1–2	Assembly Hall (17,472); Bloomington, IN
11/19/2012*; 7:00 pm, BSN	Southern Miss; Legends Classic	L 49–61	1–3	Bernard Johnson Coliseum (1,089); Huntsville, TX
11/20/2012*; 7:00 pm, BSN	Liberty; Legends Classic	W 64–50	2–3	Bernard Johnson Coliseum (599); Huntsville, TX
11/21/2012*; 7:00 pm, BSN	UC Irvine; Legends Classic	W 65–63 ^{OT}	3–3	Bernard Johnson Coliseum (531); Huntsville, TX
11/27/2012*; 7:00 pm, LHN	at Texas	L 37–65	3–4	Frank Erwin Center (9,170); Austin, TX
12/01/2012*; 5:30 pm, FCS Pacific	at Northern Arizona	L 60–77	3–5	Walkup Skydome (1,807); Flagstaff, AZ
12/08/2012*; 7:00 pm, Legacy Sports Network	at Houston Baptist	W 69–57	4–5	Sharp Gymnasium (691); Houston, TX
12/15/2012*; 7:00 pm	at Samford	W 73–57	5–5	Pete Hanna Center (649); Birmingham, AL
12/19/2012*; 7:00 pm, BSN	Huston–Tillotson	W 89–53	6–5	Bernard Johnson Coliseum (567); Huntsville, TX
12/29/2012*; 4:00 pm, BSN	Howard Payne	W 90–49	7–5	Bernard Johnson Coliseum (569); Huntsville, TX
01/04/2013; 3:30 pm, BSN	Texas A&M–Corpus Christi	W 61–57	8–5 (1–0)	Bernard Johnson Coliseum (492); Huntsville, TX
01/07/2013; 7:45 pm, BSN	Northwestern State	L 64–73	8–6 (1–1)	Bernard Johnson Coliseum (711); Huntsville, TX
01/10/2013; 7:45 pm	at Lamar	W 68–57	9–6 (2–1)	Montagne Center (2,246); Beaumont, TX
01/12/2013; 3:15 pm	at McNeese State	W 72–57	10–6 (3–1)	Burton Coliseum (722); Lake Charles, LA
01/17/2013; 8:00 pm, CSN Houston	Central Arkansas	W 63–52	11–6 (4–1)	Bernard Johnson Coliseum (1,231); Huntsville, TX
01/19/2013; 3:45 pm, BSN	Oral Roberts	L 61–65 ^{OT}	11–7 (4–2)	Bernard Johnson Coliseum (1,261); Huntsville, TX
01/24/2013; 7:40 pm	at Southeastern Louisiana	L 65–69	11–8 (4–3)	University Center (1,397); Hammond, LA
01/26/2013; 4:15 pm	at Nicholls State	L 67–70 ^{OT}	11–9 (4–4)	Stopher Gym (682); Thibodaux, LA
01/29/2013*; 7:00 pm, CSN Houston	Houston Baptist			Bernard Johnson Coliseum; Huntsville, TX
02/02/2013; 1:00 pm	at Texas A&M–Corpus Christi	W 55–51	12–9 (5–4)	American Bank Center (537); Corpus Christi, TX
02/07/2013; 7:45 pm, ESPN3	McNeese State	L 58–59 ^{OT}	12–10 (5–5)	Bernard Johnson Coliseum (1,672); Huntsville, TX
02/09/2013; 3:45 pm, BSN	Lamar	W 78–40	13–10 (6–5)	Bernard Johnson Coliseum (1,171); Huntsville, TX
02/14/2013; 7:30 pm, FCS	at Oral Roberts	L 64–74	13–11 (6–6)	Mabee Center (3,294); Tulsa, OK
02/16/2013; 4:15 pm	at Central Arkansas	W 80–75	14–11 (7–6)	Farris Center (1,067); Conway, AR
02/20/2013; 7:45 pm, BSN	Stephen F. Austin	L 44–50	14–12 (7–7)	Bernard Johnson Coliseum (2,395); Huntsville, TX
02/23/2013*; 3:00 pm	at Eastern Washington; BracketBusters	L 76–81	14–13	Reese Court (1,023); Cheney, WA
02/28/2013; 7:45 pm, BSN	Nicholls State	L 53–56	14–14 (7–8)	Bernard Johnson Coliseum (821); Huntsville, TX
03/02/2013; 4:10 pm, BSN	Southeastern Louisiana	W 54–45	15–14 (8–8)	Bernard Johnson Coliseum (1,031); Huntsville, TX
03/07/2013; 8:00 pm, ESPN3	at Stephen F. Austin	L 42–57	15–15 (8–9)	William R. Johnson Coliseum (3,517); Nacogdoches, TX
03/09/2013; 3:00 pm	at Northwestern State	L 73–84	15–16 (8–10)	Prather Coliseum (2,603); Natchitoches, LA
2013 Southland Conference men's basketball tournament
03/13/2013; 7:30 pm	vs. Central Arkansas; First Round	W 69–63	16–16	Leonard E. Merrell Center (1,276); Katy, TX
03/14/2013; 7:30 pm	vs. Oral Roberts; Quarterfinals	W 58–55	17–16	Leonard E. Merrell Center (1,480); Katy, TX
03/15/2013; 7:30 pm, ESPN3	vs. Northwestern State; Semifinals	L 52–55	17–17	Leonard E. Merrell Center (2,341); Katy, TX
*Non-conference game. ^{#}Rankings from AP Poll. (#) Tournament seedings in parentheses. All times are in Central Time.
