= 2012–13 McNeese State Cowboys basketball team =

American college basketball season

2012–13 McNeese State Cowboys basketball
- Conference: Southland Conference
- Record: 14–17 (7–11 Southland)
- Head coach: Dave Simmons (7th season)
- Assistant coaches: David Dumars; Steve Welch; Patrick Haynes
- Home arena: Burton Coliseum; Sudduth Coliseum

2012–13 Southland Conference men's basketball standings
	Conf.				Overall
Team	W		L	PCT	W		L	PCT
Stephen F. Austin	16	–	2	.889	27	–	5	.844
Northwestern State †	15	–	3	.833	23	–	9	.719
Oral Roberts	13	–	5	.722	20	–	15	.571
Southeastern Louisiana	10	–	8	.556	13	–	18	.419
Sam Houston State	8	–	10	.444	17	–	17	.500
Nicholls State	8	–	10	.444	9	–	21	.300
McNeese State	7	–	11	.389	14	–	17	.452
Central Arkansas	7	–	11	.389	13	–	17	.433
Texas A&M–Corpus Christi*	5	–	13	.278	6	–	23	.207
Lamar	1	–	17	.056	3	–	28	.097
† 2013 Southland tournament winner As of March 27, 2013 *ineligible for Postseason play due to APR Penalties; Rankings from AP Poll

The 2012–13 McNeese State Cowboys basketball team represented McNeese State University during the 2012–13 NCAA Division I men's basketball season. The Cowboys, led by seventh year head coach Dave Simmons, played their home games at Burton Coliseum, with three home games at Sudduth Coliseum, and were members of the Southland Conference.

They finished the season 14–17, 7–11 in Southland play to finish in a tie for seventh place. They lost in the quarterfinals of the Southland tournament to Southeastern Louisiana.

== Roster ==
Number	Name	Position	Height	Weight	Year	Hometown
0	Shaun Johnson	Guard	5–10	178	Freshman	Pineville, Louisiana
2	Jeremie Mitchell	Guard	6–3	180	Senior	Monroe, Louisiana
5	Dontae Cannon	Guard	6–1	168	Senior	Alexandria, Louisiana
10	Brandon Regis	Guard/Forward	6–3	196	Junior	Dallas, TX
11	Kevin Hardy	Guard	6–2	180	Sohpomore	Lake Charles, Louisiana
12	Ledrick Eackles	Guard	6–3	200	Junior	Zachary, Louisiana
13	Jordan Wells	Forward	6–7	250	Freshman	Orange, Texas
20	Adrian Fields	Forward	6–5	197	Junior	Opelousas, Louisiana
25	Craig McFerrin	Center	6–7	230	Sophomore	Baton Rouge, Louisiana
32	Desharick Guidry	Forward	6–5	200	Sophomore	Lake Charles, Louisiana
44	Austin Lewis	Forward	6–8	215	Freshman	Houston, Texas
54	Pete Kpan	Forward	6–7	235	Junior	Columbus, Ohio

== Schedule ==
Date time, TV	Opponent	Result	Record	Site (attendance) city, state
Regular season
11/09/2012*; 7:00 pm	Louisiana College	W 72–54	1–0	Burton Coliseum (492); Lake Charles, LA
11/13/2012*; 7:00 pm, CST	at LSU	L 48–73	1–1	Pete Maravich Assembly Center (6,776); Baton Rouge, LA
11/15/2012*; 7:00 pm	at Southeast Missouri State	L 53–64	1–2	Show Me Center (2,125); Cape Girardeau, MO
11/20/2012*; 7:00 pm	at Ole Miss	L 50–76	1–3	Tad Smith Coliseum (3,511); Oxford, MS
11/27/2012*; 7:30 pm	Centenary	W 93–62	2–3	Burton Coliseum (1,035); Lake Charles, LA
12/03/2012*; 6:30 pm	UT–Tyler	W 73–47	3–3	Burton Coliseum (489); Lake Charles, LA
12/08/2012*; 7:00 pm	Louisiana–Lafayette	W 77–72	4–3	Sudduth Coliseum (1,165); Lake Charles, LA
12/12/2012*; 7:00 pm	Louisiana Tech	W 80–72	5–3	Burton Coliseum (726); Lake Charles, LA
12/16/2012*; 5:00 pm, FSSW	at Texas Tech	W 80–75	6–3	United Spirit Arena (6,144); Lubbock, TX
12/22/2012*; 11:00 am, ESPNU	at No. 23 North Carolina	L 63–97	6–4	Dean Smith Center (18,258); Chapel Hill, NC
01/03/2013; 7:30 pm	at Northwestern State	L 63–78	6–5 (0–1)	Prather Coliseum (1,922); Natchitoches, LA
01/05/2013; 6:15 pm	at Stephen F. Austin	L 43–71	6–6 (0–2)	William R. Johnson Coliseum (2,001); Nacogdoches, TX
01/07/2013; 7:30 pm	Nicholls State	L 63–64	6–7 (0–3)	Burton Coliseum (639); Lake Charles, LA
01/10/2013; 8:00 pm, ESPN3	Texas A&M–Corpus Christi	W 75–71	7–7 (1–3)	Burton Coliseum (584); Lake Charles, LA
01/12/2013; 3:15 pm	Sam Houston State	L 57–72	7–8 (1–4)	Burton Coliseum (722); Lake Charles, LA
01/19/2013; 3:00 pm	Lamar	W 74–50	8–8 (2–4)	Burton Coliseum (1,524); Lake Charles, LA
01/24/2013; 7:30 pm	at Central Arkansas	L 98–103 ^{3OT}	8–9 (2–5)	Farris Center (2,712); Conway, AR
01/26/2013; 7:30 pm, FCS	at Oral Roberts	L 54–75	8–10 (2–6)	Mabee Center (3,960); Tulsa, OK
01/30/2013; 7:50 pm	Stephen F. Austin	L 39–59	8–11 (2–7)	Sudduth Coliseum (626); Lake Charles, LA
02/03/2013; 4:30 pm	Northwestern State	L 74–86	8–12 (2–8)	Sudduth Coliseum (378); Lake Charles, LA
02/07/2013; 7:45 pm, ESPN3	at Sam Houston State	W 59–58 ^{OT}	9–12 (3–8)	Bernard Johnson Coliseum (1,672); Huntsville, TX
02/09/2013; 7:00 pm	at Texas A&M–Corpus Christi	L 58–61	9–13 (3–9)	American Bank Center (1,873); Corpus Christi, TX
02/16/2013; 6:30 pm, CSN Houston	at Lamar	W 69–62	10–13 (4–9)	Montagne Center (2,837); Beaumont, TX
02/19/2013; 7:50 pm	Southeastern Louisiana	W 65–58	11–13 (5–9)	Burton Coliseum (1,005); Lake Charles, LA
02/23/2013*; 1:00 pm	at Toledo; BracketBusters	L 66–79	11–14	Savage Arena (4,393); Toledo, OH
02/28/2013; 7:30 pm	Oral Roberts	W 56–54	12–14 (6–9)	Burton Coliseum (1,192); Lake Charles, LA
03/02/2013; 4:30 pm	Central Arkansas	L 67–68	12–15 (6–10)	Burton Coliseum (2,231); Lake Charles, LA
03/07/2013; 7:35 pm	at Southeastern Louisiana	L 68–79	12–16 (6–11)	University Center (1,317); Hammond, LA
03/09/2013; 4:00 pm	at Nicholls State	W 91–88 ^{2OT}	13–16 (7–11)	Stopher Gym (670); Thibodaux, LA
2013 Southland Conference men's basketball tournament
03/13/2013; 5:00 pm	vs. Nicholls State; First Round	W 62–59	14–16	Leonard E. Merrell Center (1,276); Katy, TX
03/14/2013; 5:00 pm	vs. Southeastern Louisiana; Quarterfinals	L 65–85	14–17	Leonard E. Merrell Center (1,480); Katy, TX
*Non-conference game. ^{#}Rankings from AP Poll. (#) Tournament seedings in parentheses. All times are in Central Time.
