= 2012–13 Stephen F. Austin Lumberjacks basketball team =

American college basketball season

2012–13 Stephen F. Austin Lumberjacks men's basketball

Southland Regular Season Champions

NIT, First Round
- Conference: Southland Conference
- Record: 27–5 (16–2 Southland)
- Head coach: Danny Kaspar (13th season)
- Assistant coaches: Brette Tanner; Talvin Hester; Nick Shaw
- Home arena: William R. Johnson Coliseum

2012–13 Southland Conference men's basketball standings
	Conf.				Overall
Team	W		L	PCT	W		L	PCT
Stephen F. Austin	16	–	2	.889	27	–	5	.844
Northwestern State †	15	–	3	.833	23	–	9	.719
Oral Roberts	13	–	5	.722	20	–	15	.571
Southeastern Louisiana	10	–	8	.556	13	–	18	.419
Sam Houston State	8	–	10	.444	17	–	17	.500
Nicholls State	8	–	10	.444	9	–	21	.300
McNeese State	7	–	11	.389	14	–	17	.452
Central Arkansas	7	–	11	.389	13	–	17	.433
Texas A&M–Corpus Christi*	5	–	13	.278	6	–	23	.207
Lamar	1	–	17	.056	3	–	28	.097
† 2013 Southland tournament winner As of March 27, 2013 *ineligible for Postseason play due to APR Penalties; Rankings from AP Poll

The 2012–13 Stephen F. Austin Lumberjacks basketball team represented Stephen F. Austin University during the 2012–13 NCAA Division I men's basketball season. The Lumberjacks, led by 13th year head coach Danny Kaspar, played their home games at the William R. Johnson Coliseum and were members of the Southland Conference. They finished the season 27–5, 16–2 in Southland play to win the Southland regular season championship. They advanced to the championship game of the Southland tournament where they lost to Northwestern State. As a regular season conference champion who failed to win their conference tournament, they received an automatic bid to the 2013 NIT where they lost in the first round to Stanford.

== Roster ==
Number	Name	Position	Height	Weight	Year	Hometown
0	Thomas Walkup	Guard	6–4	195	Freshman	Pasadena, Texas
1	Danilo Toskovic	Forward	6–6	205	Sophomore	Santa Monica, California
3	Deshaunt Walker	Guard	6–0	170	Junior	Silver Spring, Maryland
4	Hal Bateman	Guard	5–11	170	Senior	Davenport, Iowa
5	Antonio Bostic	Guard	6–2	175	Senior	Shawnee, Kansas
10	Trey Pinkney	Guard	5–9	160	Freshman	Katy, Texas
11	Adam Perez	Guard	5–11	165	Freshman	San Antonio, Texas
12	Jared Harrison	Guard	5–11	175	Junior	Slidell, Louisiana
15	Joe Bright	Forward	6–4	205	Senior	Minneapolis, Minnesota
22	Rex Baxter, Jr.	Forward	6–4	190	Freshman	Houston, Texas
23	Nikola Gajic	Forward	6–5	200	Junior	Bosnia and Herzegovina
25	Desmond Haymond	Guard	6–3	190	Junior	Durant, Mississippi
32	Taylor Smith	Forward	6–6	215	Senior	Schertz, Texas
33	Patrick Costello	Forward	6–5	205	Freshman	Houston, Texas
34	Jacob Parker	Forward	6–6	210	Sophomore	Bixby, Oklahoma
43	Ice Asortse	Forward	6–7	220	Junior	Nigeria

== Schedule ==
Date time, TV	Opponent	Result	Record	Site (attendance) city, state
Regular season
11/09/2012*; 8:00 pm	Howard Payne	W 84–30	1–0	William R. Johnson Coliseum (2,203); Nacogdoches, TX
11/17/2012*; 1:00 pm	at FIU	W 69–60	2–0	U.S. Century Bank Arena (971); Miami, FL
11/20/2012*; 7:30 pm	Jarvis Christian	W 78–39	3–0	William R. Johnson Coliseum (929); Nacogdoches, TX
11/24/2012*; 2:00 pm	at Tulsa	W 57–41	4–0	Reynolds Center (3,984); Tulsa, OK
12/01/2012*; 6:00 pm	San Diego	W 56–51	5–0	William R. Johnson Coliseum (1,726); Nacogdoches, TX
12/05/2012*; 7:00 pm, FSSW	at Texas A&M	L 54–62	5–1	Reed Arena (4,684); College Station, TX
12/08/2012*; 6:00 pm	LSU–Shreveport	W 73–46	6–1	William R. Johnson Coliseum (1,101); Nacogdoches, TX
12/15/2012*; 6:00 pm	Lubbock Christian	W 78–67	7–1	William R. Johnson Coliseum (831); Nacogdoches, TX
12/18/2012*; 7:00 pm, FSSW+/FCS Central	at Oklahoma	W 56–55	8–1	Lloyd Noble Center (8,572); Norman, OK
12/20/2012*; 7:00 pm	Grambling State	W 60–38	9–1	William R. Johnson Coliseum (1,104); Nacogdoches, TX
12/29/2012; 3:00 pm	at Texas A&M–Corpus Christi	W 67–56	10–1 (1–0)	American Bank Center (1,095); Corpus Christi, TX
01/03/2013; 8:00 pm, CSN Houston	Lamar	W 79–43	11–1 (2–0)	William R. Johnson Coliseum (2,107); Nacogdoches, TX
01/05/2013; 6:15 pm	McNeese State	W 71–43	12–1 (3–0)	William R. Johnson Coliseum (2,001); Nacogdoches, TX
01/10/2013; 8:00 pm	at Central Arkansas	W 77–69	13–1 (4–0)	Farris Center (1,672); Conway, AR
01/12/2013; 7:30 pm, FCS	at Oral Roberts	W 61–50	14–1 (5–0)	Mabee Center (3,565); Tulsa, OK
01/17/2013; 8:00 pm	Southeastern Louisiana	W 52–40	15–1 (6–0)	William R. Johnson Coliseum (3,112); Nacogdoches, TX
01/19/2013; 6:15 pm	Nicholls State	W 72–49	16–1 (7–0)	William R. Johnson Coliseum (2,811); Nacogdoches, TX
01/26/2013; 3:00 pm	at Northwestern State	L 57–61	16–2 (7–1)	Prather Coliseum (2,533); Natchitoches, LA
01/30/2013; 7:50 pm	at McNeese State	W 59–39	17–2 (8–1)	Burton Coliseum (626); Lake Charles, LA
02/02/2013; 6:30 pm	at Lamar	W 65–51	18–2 (9–1)	Montagne Center (2,790); Beaumont, TX
02/07/2013; 8:00 pm	Central Arkansas	W 72–36	19–2 (10–1)	William R. Johnson Coliseum (2,757); Nacogdoches, TX
02/09/2013; 6:00 pm	Oral Roberts	W 77–67	20–2 (11–1)	William R. Johnson Coliseum (4,377); Nacogdoches, TX
02/14/2013; 8:00 pm, ESPN3	at Nicholls State	W 63–51	21–2 (12–1)	Stopher Gym (630); Thibodaux, LA
02/16/2013; 4:45 pm	at Southeastern Louisiana	L 50–54	21–3 (12–2)	University Center (862); Hammond, LA
02/20/2013*; 7:45 pm	at Sam Houston State	W 50–44	22–3 (13–2)	Bernard Johnson Coliseum (2,395); Huntsville, TX
02/22/2013*; 8:00 pm, ESPNU	at Long Beach State; BracketBusters	W 68–60	23–3	Walter Pyramid (3,766); Long Beach, CA
03/02/2013; 6:00 pm	Northwestern State	W 64–63	24–3 (14–2)	William R. Johnson Coliseum (4,836); Nacogdoches, TX
03/07/2013; 8:00 pm, ESPN3	Sam Houston State	W 57–42	25–3 (15–2)	William R. Johnson Coliseum (3,517); Nacogdoches, TX
03/09/2013; 6:30 pm	Texas A&M–Corpus Christi	W 58–49	26–3 (16–2)	William R. Johnson Coliseum (2,013); Nacogdoches, TX
2013 Southland tournament
03/15/2013; 5:00 pm, ESPN3	vs. Southeastern Louisiana; Semifinals	W 68–57	27–3	Leonard E. Merrell Center (2,341); Katy, TX
03/16/2013; 7:30 pm, ESPN2	vs. Northwestern State; Championship Game	L 66–68	27–4	Leonard E. Merrell Center (3,124); Katy, TX
2013 NIT
03/19/2013*; 10:00 pm, ESPN2	at Stanford; First Round	L 57–58	27–5	Maples Pavilion (1,050); Stanford, CA
*Non-conference game. ^{#}Rankings from AP Poll. (#) Tournament seedings in parentheses. All times are in Central Time.
