= 2012–13 Marquette Golden Eagles men's basketball team =

American college basketball season

2012–13 Marquette Golden Eagles men's basketball
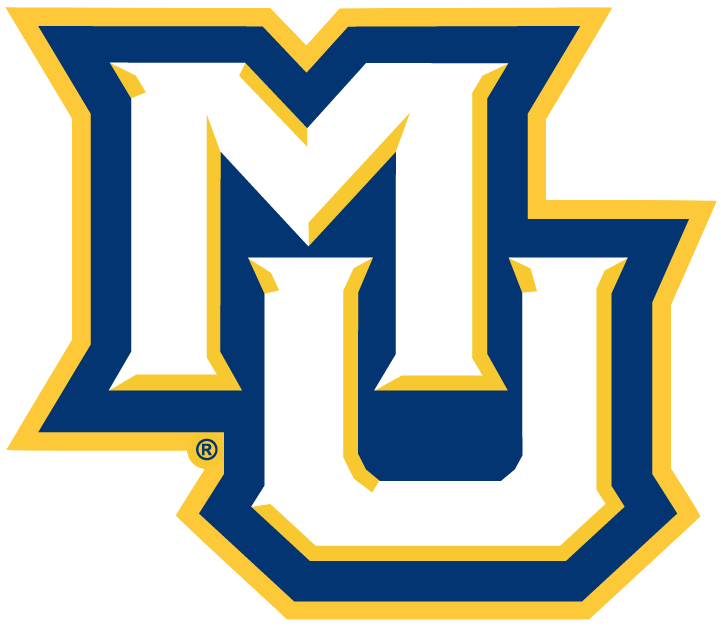

Big East regular season co-champions

NCAA tournament, Elite Eight
- Conference: Big East Conference (1979–2013)

Ranking
- Coaches: No. 11
- AP: No. 15
- Record: 26–9 (14–4 Big East)
- Head coach: Buzz Williams (5th season)
- Assistant coaches: Brad Autry; Isaac Chew
- Home arena: BMO Harris Bradley Center

2012–13 Big East men's basketball standings
| | Conf. | | | | Overall |
| Team | W | | L | PCT | W | | L | PCT |
|---|---|---|---|---|---|---|---|---|
| No. 2 Louisville†** | 14 | – | 4 | .778 | 35 | – | 5 | .875 |
| No. 8 Georgetown | 14 | – | 4 | .778 | 25 | – | 7 | .781 |
| No. 15 Marquette | 14 | – | 4 | .778 | 26 | – | 9 | .743 |
| No. 20 Pittsburgh | 12 | – | 6 | .667 | 24 | – | 9 | .727 |
| No. 16 Syracuse | 11 | – | 7 | .611 | 30 | – | 10 | .750 |
| No. 23 Notre Dame | 11 | – | 7 | .611 | 25 | – | 10 | .714 |
| Villanova | 10 | – | 8 | .556 | 20 | – | 14 | .588 |
| Connecticut* | 10 | – | 8 | .556 | 20 | – | 10 | .667 |
| Cincinnati | 9 | – | 9 | .500 | 22 | – | 12 | .647 |
| Providence | 9 | – | 9 | .500 | 19 | – | 15 | .559 |
| St. John's | 8 | – | 10 | .444 | 17 | – | 16 | .515 |
| Rutgers | 5 | – | 13 | .278 | 15 | – | 16 | .484 |
| Seton Hall | 3 | – | 15 | .167 | 15 | – | 18 | .455 |
| South Florida | 3 | – | 15 | .167 | 12 | – | 19 | .387 |
| DePaul | 2 | – | 16 | .111 | 11 | – | 21 | .344 |
† 2013 Big East tournament winner As of March 30, 2013; Rankings from AP Poll; *Ineligible for postseason play due to APR penalties.

The 2012–13 Marquette Golden Eagles men's basketball team represented Marquette University in the 2012–13 NCAA Division I men's basketball season. Marquette was coached by Buzz Williams and played their home games at the BMO Harris Bradley Center in Milwaukee, WI as were members of the Big East Conference. They finished the season 26–9, 14–4 in Big East play to earn a share of Big East Conference regular season championship. They lost in the quarterfinals of the Big East tournament against Cincinnati. The Golden Eagles received an at-large bid to the NCAA tournament where they defeated Davidson, Butler, and Miami, before losing to Syracuse in the Elite Eight.

== Previous season ==
The Golden Eagles finished the 2011–12 season 26–7, 14–4 in Big East play to finish in second place. Syracuse, the winner of the Big East regular season, was later forced to vacate its wins from the season due to NCAA violations. The Eagles received an at-large bid to the NCAA tournament where they defeated BYU and Murray State to advance to the Sweet Sixteen for the second consecutive year. There they lost to Florida.

== Roster ==
| # | Name | Height | Weight (lbs.) | Position | Class | Hometown | Previous Team(s) |
|---|---|---|---|---|---|---|---|
| 0 | Jamil Wilson | 6'7" | 210 | F | Jr. | Racine, WI, U.S. | Horlick HS/Oregon |
| 1 | Jamal Ferguson | 6'4" | 180 | G | Fr. | Norfolk, VA, U.S. | Maury HS |
| 4 | Todd Mayo | 6'3" | 190 | G | So. | Huntington, WV, U.S. | Notre Dame Prep |
| 5 | Junior Cadougan | 6'1" | 205 | G | Sr. | Toronto, ON, Canada | Christian Life Center Academy |
| 10 | Juan Anderson | 6'6" | 205 | F | So. | Oakland, CA, U.S. | Castro Valley HS |
| 12 | Derrick Wilson | 6'1" | 215 | G | So. | Anchorage, AK, U.S. | The Hotchkiss School |
| 13 | Vander Blue | 6'4" | 190 | G | Jr. | Madison, WI, U.S. | Madison Memorial HS |
| 22 | Trent Lockett | 6'5" | 210 | G | Sr. | Golden Valley, MN, U.S. | Hopkins HS/ Arizona State |
| 23 | Jake Thomas | 6'3" | 190 | G | Jr. | Racine, WI, U.S. | St. Catherine's HS/South Dakota |
| 25 | Steve Taylor Jr. | 6'7" | 230 | F | Fr. | Chicago, IL, U.S. | Simeon Career Academy |
| 30 | Dylan Flood | 6'4" | 200 | G | So. | Lemont, IL, U.S. | Benet Academy |
| 33 | Garrett Swanson | 6'7" | 200 | F | So. | Spokane, WA, U.S. | Mead HS |
| 42 | Chris Otule | 6'10" | 250 | C | Sr. | Richmond, TX, U.S. | Fort Bend HS |
| 54 | Davante Gardner | 6'8" | 290 | F | Jr. | Suffolk, VA, U.S. | Kings Fork HS |

== Schedule and results ==
| Date time, TV | Rank^{#} | Opponent^{#} | Result | Record | Site (attendance) city, state |
Non-conference regular season
| November 9*; 6:00 pm, NBCSN | | vs. No. 4 Ohio State; Carrier Classic; Game cancelled due to condensation on court | | | USS Yorktown; Charleston, SC |
| November 11*; 4:30 pm, ESPNU | | Colgate; EA SPORTS Maui Invitational | W 84–63 | 1–0 | BMO Harris Bradley Center (13,065); Milwaukee, WI |
| November 13*; 8:00 pm, ESPN3 | | Southeastern Louisiana | W 64–53 | 2–0 | BMO Harris Bradley Center (12,587); Milwaukee, WI |
| November 19*; 2:00 pm, ESPN2 | | vs. Butler; EA SPORTS Maui Invitational | L 71–72 | 2–1 | Lahaina Civic Center (2,400); Maui, HI |
| November 20*; 2:30 pm, ESPN2 | | vs. Mississippi State; EA SPORTS Maui Invitational | W 89–62 | 3–1 | Lahaina Civic Center (2,400); Maui, HI |
| November 21*; 5:00 pm, ESPN2 | | vs. USC; EA SPORTS Maui Invitational | W 72–64 | 4–1 | Lahaina Civic Center (2,400); Maui, HI |
| November 26*; 7:00 pm, ESPN3 | | UMBC | W 79–46 | 5–1 | BMO Harris Bradley Center (12,679); Milwaukee, WI |
| November 29*; 8:00 pm, ESPN2 | | at No. 7 Florida; SEC–Big East Challenge | L 49–82 | 5–2 | Stephen C. O'Connell Center (10,245); Gainesville, FL |
| December 8*; 6:00 pm, ESPN2 | | Wisconsin | W 60–50 | 6–2 | BMO Harris Bradley Center (18,588); Milwaukee, WI |
| December 15*; 2:00 pm, ESPN3 | | Savannah State | W 71–51 | 7–2 | BMO Harris Bradley Center (13,366); Milwaukee, WI |
| December 19*; 8:00 pm | | at Green Bay | L 47–49 | 7–3 | Resch Center (6,733); Green Bay, WI |
| December 22*; 1:00 pm, ESPNU | | LSU | W 84–80 | 8–3 | BMO Harris Bradley Center (14,309); Milwaukee, WI |
| December 29*; 2:00 pm, Sports32/ESPN3 | | North Carolina Central | W 75–66 | 9–3 | BMO Harris Bradley Center (13,600); Milwaukee, WI |
Big East regular season
| January 1; 7:00 pm, ESPNU | | Connecticut | W 82–76 ^{OT} | 10–3 (1–0) | BMO Harris Bradley Center (14,159); Milwaukee, WI |
| January 5; 2:00 pm, Big East Network | | No. 15 Georgetown | W 49–48 | 11–3 (2–0) | BMO Harris Bradley Center (15,433); Milwaukee, WI |
| January 12; 12:00 am, ESPNU | | at Pittsburgh | W 74–67 ^{OT} | 12–3 (3–0) | Petersen Events Center (12,513); Pittsburgh, PA |
| January 16; 8:00 pm, Big East Network | No. 25 | Seton Hall | W 69–62 | 13–3 (4–0) | BMO Harris Bradley Center (13,842); Milwaukee, WI |
| January 19; 7:00 pm, ESPNU | No. 25 | at Cincinnati | L 69–71 ^{OT} | 13–4 (4–1) | Fifth Third Arena (12,812); Cincinnati, OH |
| January 26; 2:00 pm, Big East Network | | Providence | W 81–71 | 14–4 (5–1) | BMO Harris Bradley Center (15,140); Milwaukee, WI |
| January 28; 9:00 pm, ESPNU | No. 25 | South Florida | W 63–50 | 15–4 (6–1) | BMO Harris Bradley Center (15,136); Milwaukee, WI |
| February 3; 2:00 pm, ESPN | No. 25 | at No. 12 Louisville | L 51–70 | 15–5 (6–2) | KFC Yum! Center (21,418); Louisville, KY |
| February 6; 7:00 pm, ESPN2 | No. 24 | at South Florida | W 70–47 | 16–5 (7–2) | USF Sun Dome (5,186); Tampa, FL |
| February 9; 2:00 pm, Big East Network | No. 24 | DePaul | W 89–78 | 17–5 (8–2) | BMO Harris Bradley Center (16,176); Milwaukee, WI |
| February 11; 7:00 pm, ESPN | No. 18 | at No. 15 Georgetown | L 55–63 | 17–6 (8–3) | Verizon Center (11,821); Washington, D.C. |
| February 16; 1:00 pm, CBS | No. 18 | No. 16 Pittsburgh | W 79–69 | 18–6 (9–3) | BMO Harris Bradley Center (17,308); Milwaukee, WI |
| February 19; 7:00 pm, Big East Network | No. 17 | at Seton Hall | W 67–46 | 19–6 (10–3) | Prudential Center (6,224); Newark, NJ |
| February 23; 6:00 pm, ESPN/ESPN2 | No. 17 | at Villanova | L 56–60 | 19–7 (10–4) | The Pavilion (6,500); Villanova, PA |
| February 25; 7:00 pm, ESPN | No. 22 | No. 12 Syracuse | W 74–71 | 20–7 (11–4) | BMO Harris Bradley Center (16,049); Milwaukee, WI |
| March 2; 2:00 pm, ESPN | No. 22 | No. 21 Notre Dame | W 72–64 | 21–7 (12–4) | BMO Harris Bradley Center (19,093); Milwaukee, WI |
| March 5; 7:00 pm, Big East Network | No. 15 | at Rutgers | W 60–54 | 22–7 (13–4) | Louis Brown Athletic Center (5,021); Piscataway, NJ |
| March 9; 2:00 pm, ESPN | No. 15 | at St. John's | W 69–67 ^{OT} | 23–7 (14–4) | Madison Square Garden (12,474); New York, NY |
Big East tournament
| March 14; 9:43 pm, ESPN | No. 12 | vs. No. 24 Notre Dame; Quarterfinals | L 65–73 | 23–8 | Madison Square Garden (20,057); New York, NY |
NCAA tournament
| March 21*; 3:10 pm, truTV | (3 E) No. 15 | vs. (14 E) Davidson; Second Round | W 59–58 | 24–8 | Rupp Arena (14,622); Lexington, KY |
| March 23*; 8:03 pm, CBS | (3 E) No. 15 | vs. (6 E) Butler; Third Round | W 74–72 | 25–8 | Rupp Arena (20,601); Lexington, KY |
| March 28*; 7:15 pm, CBS | (3 E) No. 15 | vs. (2 E) No. 5 Miami (FL); Sweet Sixteen | W 71–61 | 26–8 | Verizon Center (19,731); Washington, D.C. |
| March 30*; 4:30 pm, CBS | (3 E) No. 15 | vs. (4 E) No. 16 Syracuse; Elite Eight | L 39–55 | 26–9 | Verizon Center (19,801); Washington, D.C. |
*Non-conference game. ^{#}Rankings from AP Poll. (#) Tournament seedings in parentheses. All times are in Eastern Time. (#) during NCAA Tournament is seed with Region.
