= 2012–13 Florida Gators men's basketball team =

American college basketball season

2012–13 Florida Gators men's basketball

SEC regular season champions

NCAA tournament, Elite Eight
- Conference: Southeastern Conference

Ranking
- Coaches: No. 9
- AP: No. 14
- Record: 29–8 (14–4 SEC)
- Head coach: Billy Donovan (17th season)
- Assistant coach: Rashon Burno; Matt McCall; John Pelphrey
- Home arena: O'Connell Center

2012–13 Southeastern Conference men's basketball standings
	Conf.				Overall
Team	W		L	PCT	W		L	PCT
No. 14 Florida	14	–	4	.778	29	–	8	.784
Ole Miss †	12	–	6	.667	27	–	9	.750
Alabama	12	–	6	.667	23	–	13	.639
Kentucky	12	–	6	.667	21	–	12	.636
Missouri	11	–	7	.611	23	–	11	.676
Tennessee	11	–	7	.611	20	–	13	.606
Arkansas	10	–	8	.556	19	–	13	.594
LSU	9	–	9	.500	19	–	12	.613
Georgia	9	–	9	.500	15	–	17	.469
Vanderbilt	8	–	10	.444	16	–	17	.485
Texas A&M	7	–	11	.389	18	–	15	.545
South Carolina	4	–	14	.222	14	–	18	.438
Mississippi State	4	–	14	.222	10	–	22	.313
Auburn	3	–	15	.167	9	–	23	.281
† 2013 SEC tournament winner As of March 31, 2013; Rankings from AP poll

The 2012–13 Florida Gators men's basketball team represented the University of Florida in the sport of basketball during the 2012–13 college basketball season. The Gators competed in Division I of the National Collegiate Athletic Association (NCAA) and the Southeastern Conference (SEC). They were led by head coach Billy Donovan, and played their home games in the O'Connell Center on the university's Gainesville, Florida campus.

The Gators finished the SEC regular season with a 14–4 conference record, earning their sixth SEC regular season championship. As a No. 3 seed in the 2013 NCAA Division I men's basketball tournament, the Gators advanced to the Elite Eight for the third consecutive year where they were defeated by Michigan.

== Previous season ==
The Gators finished the 2011–12 season with a record of 26–11 overall, a 10–6 record in SEC play and lost in the Elite Eight round of the NCAA tournament to Louisville. Freshman shooting guard Bradley Beal, who finished second on the team in scoring average, decided to forgo his sophomore season and enter the 2012 NBA draft. He was selected by the Washington Wizards with the third overall pick.

== Roster ==
2012–13 Florida Gators men's basketball team
Players
Coaches

Pos.	#	Name	Height	Weight	Year	Hometown
G	0	Jacob Kurtz (W)	6 ft 5 in (1.96 m)	208 lb (94 kg)	So	Oviedo, Florida
G	1	Kenny Boynton	6 ft 2 in (1.88 m)	190 lb (86 kg)	Sr	Pompano Beach, Florida
G	42	Billy Donovan Jr. (redshirt)	6 ft 2 in (1.88 m)	203 lb (92 kg)	Jr	Gainesville, Florida
F/C	2	Damontre Harris (redshirt)	6 ft 10 in (2.08 m)	228 lb (103 kg)	Jr	Fayetteville, North Carolina
G	3	Mike Rosario	6 ft 3 in (1.91 m)	183 lb (83 kg)	RS Sr	Jersey City, New Jersey
C	4	Patric Young	6 ft 9 in (2.06 m)	249 lb (113 kg)	Jr	Jacksonville, Florida
G	5	Scottie Wilbekin	6 ft 2 in (1.88 m)	176 lb (80 kg)	Jr	Gainesville, Florida
F	10	Dorian Finney-Smith (redshirt)	6 ft 8 in (2.03 m)	205 lb (93 kg)	So	Portsmouth, Virginia
G	11	Braxton Ogbueze	6 ft 0 in (1.83 m)	182 lb (83 kg)	Fr	Charlotte, North Carolina
G	12	Dillon Graham	6 ft 4 in (1.93 m)	179 lb (81 kg)	Fr	Orlando, Florida
F	15	Will Yeguete	6 ft 7 in (2.01 m)	240 lb (109 kg)	Jr	Bordeaux, France
G	20	Michael Frazier II	6 ft 4 in (1.93 m)	200 lb (91 kg)	Fr	Tampa, Florida
G/F	24	Casey Prather	6 ft 6 in (1.98 m)	208 lb (94 kg)	Jr	Jackson, Tennessee
G/F	25	DeVon Walker	6 ft 6 in (1.98 m)	191 lb (87 kg)	Fr	Winter Haven, Florida
F/C	33	Erik Murphy	6 ft 10 in (2.08 m)	238 lb (108 kg)	Sr	South Kingstown, Rhode Island

Head coach

- Billy Donovan (17th year)

Assistant coach(es)

- Rashon Burno (1st year)
- Matt McCall (2nd year)
- John Pelphrey (2nd year)

Legend

- (C) Team captain
- (S) Suspended
- (I) Ineligible
- (W) Walk-on
- Injured
- Current redshirt

Roster
Last update: April 1, 2013

=== Coaches ===
Name	Position	College	Graduating year
Billy Donovan	Head coach	Providence College	1987
Matt McCall	Associate Head Coach	University of Florida	2005
John Pelphrey	Assistant coach	University of Kentucky	1992
Rashon Burno^{[a]}	Assistant coach	DePaul University	2002
Darren Hertz	Assistant to the Head Coach	University of Florida	1997
Oliver Winterbone	Video Coordinator	Rutgers University	2005
Preston Greene	Strength and conditioning Coordinator	Clemson University	1999
Dave Werner	Athletic Trainer	Eastern Kentucky University	1991
Tom Williams	Academic Counselor	University of Florida	1978

NOTES:

^{^[a]}Rashon Burno was hired as an assistant coach on April 12, 2012. The position became available after Norm Roberts resigned to become an assistant coach at Kansas.

== Team statistics ==
As of March 31, 2013.
Indicates team leader in specific category.
Retrieved from Gatorzone.com

Name	PTS	PPG	FG %	3P %	FT %	AST	REB	BLK	STL
Kenny Boynton	444	12.0	.394	.321	.822	102	110	3	31
Michael Frazier II	202	5.6	.446	.468	.839	34	113	1	20
Dillon Graham	11	0.5	.263	.100	.000	5	4	1	1
Jacob Kurtz	12	0.6	.625	1.000	.500	2	11	0	2
Erik Murphy	440	12.2	.516	.453	.784	50	199	25	23
Braxton Ogbueze	19	0.8	.318	.200	.364	7	13	0	4
Casey Prather	181	6.2	.622	.286	.583	29	106	16	25
Mike Rosario	450	12.5	.448	.367	.831	72	92	1	34
DeVon Walker	20	0.8	.182	.143	.786	2	17	4	2
Scottie Wilbekin	319	9.1	.453	.359	.725	174	101	2	53
Will Yeguete	170	5.5	.531	.250	.570	31	181	9	36
Patric Young	374	10.1	.586	.000	.498	32	232	58	34
TEAM	2642	71.4	.478	.378	.677	540	1297	120	265

== Schedule and results ==
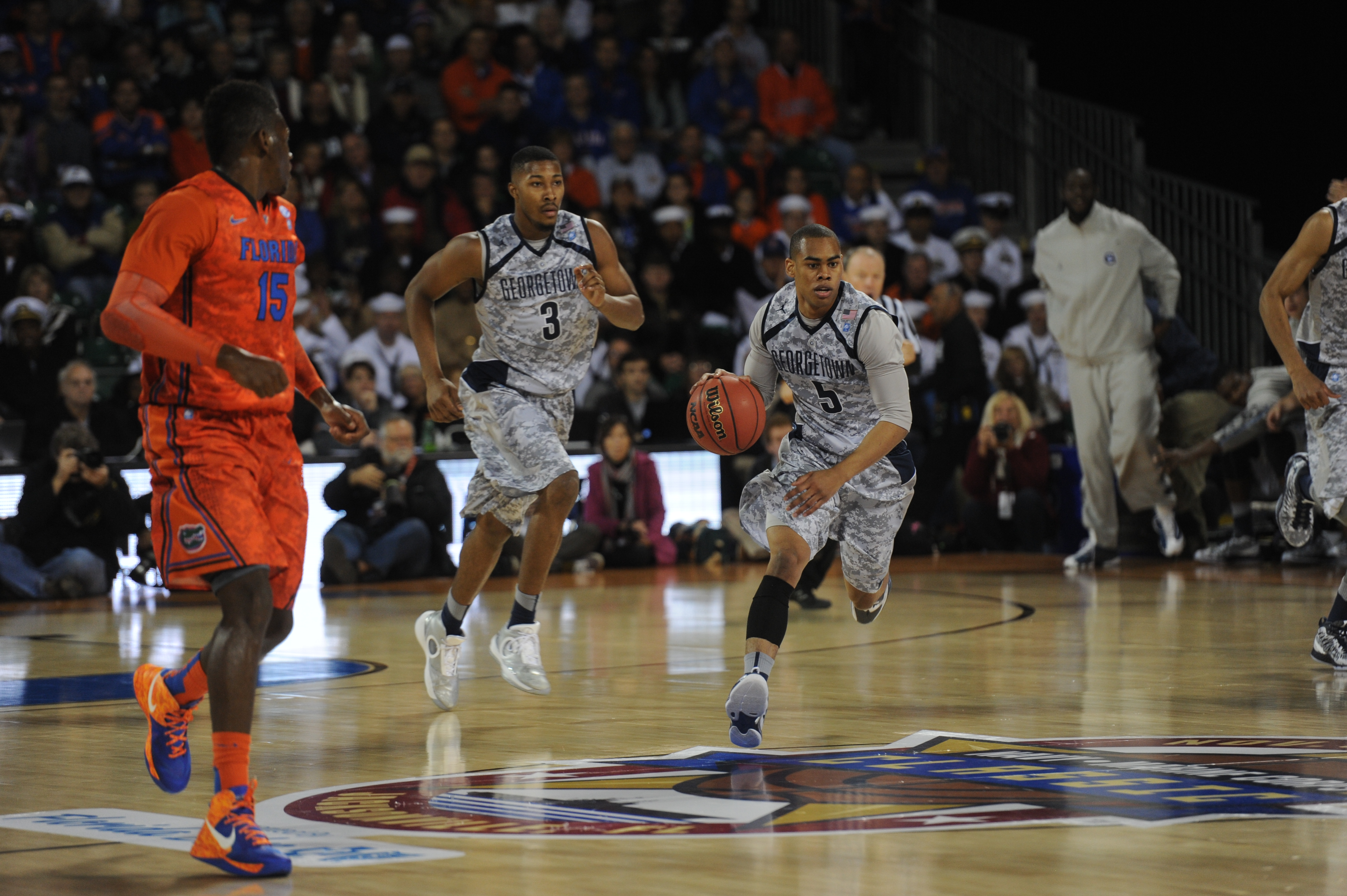
The Gators opened the year against Georgetown outdoors aboard the USS Bataan in Jacksonville, though the game was canceled at halftime due to condensation on the floor.

Date time, TV	Rank^{#}	Opponent^{#}	Result	Record	Site (attendance) city, state
Exhibition
Nov. 1, 2012*; 7:00 p.m., GatorVision	No. 10	Nebraska–Kearney	W 101–71	–	O'Connell Center (7,121); Gainesville, Florida
Non-conference regular season
Nov. 11, 2012*; 3:30 p.m., Sun/FSFL	No. 10	Alabama State; Global Sports Main Event	W 84–35	1–0	O'Connell Center (8,047); Gainesville, Florida
Nov. 14, 2012*; 7:00 p.m., ESPN2	No. 10	No. 22 Wisconsin	W 74–56	2–0	O'Connell Center (9,614); Gainesville, Florida
Nov. 18, 2012*; 4:00 p.m., Sun/FS South	No. 10	vs. Middle Tennessee; Global Sports Main Event	W 66–45	3–0	Tampa Bay Times Forum (7,161); Tampa, Florida
Nov. 20, 2012*; 7:00 p.m., Sun/FSFL	No. 7	Savannah State; Global Sports Main Event	W 58–40	4–0	O'Connell Center (7,323); Gainesville, Florida
Nov. 23, 2012*; 4:00 p.m., Sun/FSFL	No. 7	UCF; Global Sports Main Event	W 79–66	5–0	O'Connell Center (10,195); Gainesville, Florida
Nov. 29, 2012*; 9:00 p.m., ESPN2	No. 7	Marquette; SEC–Big East Challenge	W 82–49	6–0	O'Connell Center (10,245); Gainesville, Florida
Dec. 5, 2012*; 7:00 p.m., ESPNU/ESPN2	No. 6	at Florida State	W 72–47	7–0	Donald L. Tucker Center (10,593); Tallahassee, Florida
Dec. 15, 2012*; 10:00 p.m., ESPN	No. 5	at No. 8 Arizona	L 64–65	7–1	McKale Center (14,545); Tucson, Arizona
Dec. 19, 2012*; 7:00 p.m., Sun/FSFL/ESPN3	No. 8	Southeastern Louisiana	W 82–43	8–1	O'Connell Center (8,057); Gainesville, Florida
Dec. 22, 2012*; 8:00 p.m., ESPN2	No. 8	vs. Kansas State; Hy-Vee Wildcat Classic	L 61–67	8–2	Sprint Center (16,303); Kansas City, Missouri
Dec. 29, 2012*; 4:30 p.m., FSN	No. 14	vs. Air Force; Orange Bowl Basketball Classic	W 78–61	9–2	BB&T Center (12,779); Sunrise, Florida
Jan. 6, 2013*; 4:30 p.m., NBCSN	No. 13	at Yale	W 79–58	10–2	John J. Lee Amphitheater (2,532); New Haven, Connecticut
SEC regular season
Jan. 9, 2013; 7:00 p.m., CSS/ESPN3	No. 11	Georgia	W 77–44	11–2 (1–0)	O'Connell Center (11,366); Gainesville, Florida
Jan. 12, 2013; 4:00 p.m., ESPNU	No. 11	at LSU	W 74–52	12–2 (2–0)	Pete Maravich Assembly Center (9,964); Baton Rouge, Louisiana
Jan. 17, 2013; 7:00 p.m., ESPN2	No. 10	at Texas A&M	W 68–47	13–2 (3–0)	Reed Arena (11,046); College Station, Texas
Jan. 19, 2013; 2:00 p.m., ESPN	No. 10	No. 17 Missouri	W 83–52	14–2 (4–0)	O'Connell Center (12,597); Gainesville, Florida
Jan. 23, 2013; 8:00 p.m., SECN/ESPN3	No. 8	at Georgia	W 64–47	15–2 (5–0)	Stegeman Coliseum (6,793); Athens, Georgia
Jan. 26, 2013; 8:00 p.m., ESPN2	No. 8	at Mississippi State	W 82–47	16–2 (6–0)	Humphrey Coliseum (7,696); Starkville, Mississippi
Jan. 30, 2013; 8:00 p.m., SECN/ESPN3	No. 4	South Carolina	W 75–36	17–2 (7–0)	O'Connell Center (10,533); Gainesville, Florida
Feb. 2, 2013; 7:00 p.m., ESPNU	No. 4	No. 16 Ole Miss	W 78–64	18–2 (8–0)	O'Connell Center (12,522); Gainesville, Florida
Feb. 5, 2013; 7:00 p.m., ESPN	No. 2	at Arkansas	L 69–80	18–3 (8–1)	Bud Walton Arena (13,816); Fayetteville, Arkansas
Feb. 9, 2013; 5:00 p.m., FSN/ESPN3	No. 2	Mississippi State	W 83–58	19–3 (9–1)	O'Connell Center (12,444); Gainesville, Florida
Feb. 12, 2013; 7:00 p.m., ESPN	No. 7	No. 25 Kentucky	W 69–52	20–3 (10–1)	O'Connell Center (12,480); Gainesville, Florida
Feb. 16, 2013; 1:45 p.m., SECN/ESPN3	No. 7	at Auburn	W 83–52	21–3 (11–1)	Auburn Arena (8,953); Auburn, Alabama
Feb. 19, 2013; 9:00 p.m., ESPN	No. 5	at Missouri	L 60–63	21–4 (11–2)	Mizzou Arena (15,061); Columbia, Missouri
Feb. 23, 2013; 7:00 p.m., ESPNU	No. 5	Arkansas	W 71–54	22–4 (12–2)	O'Connell Center (12,609); Gainesville, Florida
Feb. 26, 2013; 9:00 p.m., ESPN	No. 8	at Tennessee	L 58–64	22–5 (12–3)	Thompson–Boling Arena (19,567); Knoxville, Tennessee
Mar. 2, 2013; 12:00 p.m., ESPN	No. 8	Alabama	W 64–52	23–5 (13–3)	O'Connell Center (11,624); Gainesville, Florida
Mar. 6, 2013; 8:00 p.m., SECN/ESPN3	No. 11	Vanderbilt	W 66–40	24–5 (14–3)	O'Connell Center (10,504); Gainesville, Florida
Mar. 9, 2013; 12:00 p.m., CBS	No. 11	at Kentucky	L 57–61	24–6 (14–4)	Rupp Arena (24,294); Lexington, Kentucky
SEC Tournament
Mar. 15, 2013; 1:00 p.m., ESPNU	(1) No. 13	vs. (9) LSU; Quarterfinals	W 80–58	25–6	Bridgestone Arena (15,649); Nashville, Tennessee
Mar. 16, 2013; 1:00 p.m., ABC/ESPN3	(1) No. 13	vs. (4) Alabama; Semifinals	W 61–51	26–6	Bridgestone Arena (14,574); Nashville, Tennessee
Mar. 17, 2013; 1:00 p.m., ABC	(1) No. 13	vs. (3) Ole Miss; Championship game	L 63–66	26–7	Bridgestone Arena (12,138); Nashville, Tennessee
NCAA tournament
Mar. 22, 2013; 7:27 p.m., TruTV	(3 S) No. 14	vs. (14 S) Northwestern State; Second round	W 79–47	27–7	Frank Erwin Center (13,825); Austin, Texas
Mar. 24, 2013; 6:10 p.m., TNT	(3 S) No. 14	vs. (11 S) Minnesota; Third round	W 78–64	28–7	Frank Erwin Center (14,520); Austin, Texas
Mar. 29, 2013; 10:38 p.m., TBS	(3 S) No. 14	vs. (15 S) Florida Gulf Coast; Sweet Sixteen	W 62–50	29–7	Cowboys Stadium (40,639); Arlington, Texas
Mar. 31, 2013; 2:20 p.m., CBS	(3 S) No. 14	vs. (4 S) No. 10 Michigan; Elite Eight	L 59–79	29–8	Cowboys Stadium (36,585); Arlington, Texas
*Non-conference game. ^{#}Rankings from AP poll. (#) Tournament seedings in parentheses.

NOTES:

^{^[a]}Game played aboard the USS Bataan at Naval Station Mayport in Jacksonville, Florida.

^{^[b]}The game was suspended due to condensation on the court at halftime with the Gators leading 27–23. It was not made up.

== Rankings ==
Ranking movement Legend: ██ Increase in ranking. ██ Decrease in ranking. NR = Not ranked. RV = Received votes.
Poll	Pre	Wk 1 Nov. 12	Wk 2 Nov. 19	Wk 3 Nov. 26	Wk 4 Dec. 3	Wk 5 Dec. 10	Wk 6 Dec. 17	Wk 7 Dec. 24	Wk 8 Dec. 31	Wk 9 Jan. 7	Wk 10 Jan. 14	Wk 11 Jan. 21	Wk 12 Jan. 28	Wk 13 Feb. 4	Wk 14 Feb. 11	Wk 15 Feb. 18	Wk 16 Feb. 25	Wk 17 Mar. 4	Wk 18 Mar. 11	Wk 19 Mar. 18	Final Apr. 9
AP	10	10	7	7	6	5	8	14	13	11	10	8	4	2	7	5	8	11	13	14	–
Coaches	10	10	8	7	5	5	9	11	9	9	9	7	4	2	6	4	6	9	11	12	9

== Awards and honors ==
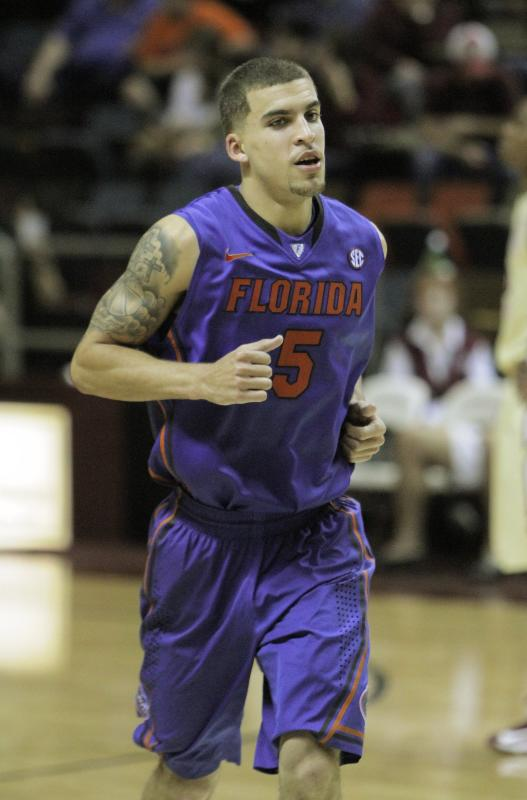
Scottie Wilbekin

Michael Frazier II

- SEC Freshman of the Week (11/26/12–12/3/12). Frazier scored 17 points while shooting 5-for-8 from three-point range in a win over Marquette.
- SEC Freshman of the Week (2/11/13–2/18/13). Frazier scored 18 points while shooting 6-for-7 from three-point range in a road victory over Auburn.

Scottie Wilbekin

- SEC Player of the Week (1/21/13–1/28/13). Wilbekin averaged 15 points and 6 assists in two wins over Georgia and Mississippi State.
