= 2013 Southland Conference men's basketball tournament =

- Tournament logo
- Classification: Division I
- Season: 2012–13
- Teams: 8
- Site: Leonard E. Merrell Center; Katy, Texas
- Champions: Northwestern State (3rd title)
- Winning coach: Mike McConathy (3rd title)
- MVP: Shamir Davis (Northwestern State)
- Television: ESPN3, ESPN2

2012–13 Southland Conference men's basketball standings
	Conf.				Overall
Team	W		L	PCT	W		L	PCT
Stephen F. Austin	16	–	2	.889	27	–	5	.844
Northwestern State †	15	–	3	.833	23	–	9	.719
Oral Roberts	13	–	5	.722	20	–	15	.571
Southeastern Louisiana	10	–	8	.556	13	–	18	.419
Sam Houston State	8	–	10	.444	17	–	17	.500
Nicholls State	8	–	10	.444	9	–	21	.300
McNeese State	7	–	11	.389	14	–	17	.452
Central Arkansas	7	–	11	.389	13	–	17	.433
Texas A&M–Corpus Christi*	5	–	13	.278	6	–	23	.207
Lamar	1	–	17	.056	3	–	28	.097
† 2013 Southland tournament winner As of March 27, 2013 *ineligible for Postseason play due to APR Penalties; Rankings from AP Poll

The 2013 Southland Conference men's basketball tournament, a part of the 2012–13 NCAA Division I men's basketball season, took place March 13–16, 2013 at the Merrell Center in Katy, Texas The winner of the tournament received the Southland Conference's automatic bid to the 2013 NCAA Tournament.

== Format ==
With the addition of Oral Roberts to the league, and the departures of Texas-Arlington, Texas-San Antonio, and Texas State to the WAC, a new tournament format was used from this year. For the first time in seven years, the Southland did not have divisions for basketball. The tournament bracket still included the top eight regular season finishers, but the first and second seeds received double byes and began play in the semifinal round. The third and fourth seeds earned a single bye directly into the quarterfinals, while the fifth through eighth seeds played in the first round. Texas A&M-Corpus Christi was ineligible for postseason play, and thus could not complete in the tournament.

Stephen F. Austin received the top seed based on tiebreakers. Northwestern State won the tiebreaker over Oral Roberts and received the second double bye. Oral Roberts was the three seed, while Southeastern Louisiana took the four based on conference tiebreakers. Lamar was eliminated from playoffs.

== Bracket ==
First round Wednesday, March 13
5	Nicholls State	59
8	McNeese State	62
6	Sam Houston State	69
7	Central Arkansas	63

Quarterfinals; Thursday, March 14
4	Southeastern Louisiana	85
8	McNeese State	65
3	Oral Roberts	55
6	Sam Houston State	58

Semifinals; Friday, March 15; ESPN3
1	Stephen F. Austin	68
4	Southeastern Louisiana	57
2	Northwestern State	55
6	Sam Houston State	52

Championship Game; Saturday, March 16; ESPN2
1	Stephen F. Austin	66
2	Northwestern State	68
