= Jim Yarbrough (basketball) =

American basketball coach (born 1964)

Current position
- Record: 230–177 (.565)

Biographical details
- Born: February 8, 1964 (age 62)
- Education: Florida State University (1987); The Citadel (2000)

Coaching career (HC unless noted)
- 1987–1993: The Bolles (FL) (assistant)
- 1993–1994: West Florida (assistant)
- 1994–2000: Charleston (associate)
- 2000–2005: Valdosta State
- 2005–2014: Southeastern Louisiana
- 2014–2021: Bishop Moore Catholic HS
- 2022–present: Clearwater Central Catholic HS

Head coaching record
- Overall: 230–177 (.565) (college)

Jim Yarbrough (born February 8, 1964) is an American college basketball head coach with a 230-177 record over 14 seasons at Valdosta State University and Southeastern Louisiana University. He was named Southeastern Louisiana's 11th head basketball coach on June 23, 2005, and was dismissed on March 17, 2014, after compiling a 133-135 record in nine seasons that made Yarbrough the second-winningest men's basketball coach in SLU history, with the second-highest winning percentage in school history. His tenure included wins over Mississippi State, Penn State and Oregon State. Prior to his SLU career, Yarbrough led Valdosta State to multiple seasons in the NCAA Division II postseason tournament, including two seasons in which he was named both NCAA Division II South Region Coach of the Year and Gulf South Conference Coach of the Year. His 2003-04 Valdosta State team finished 25-4 and ranked No. 3 in the nation at the close of the season. Before beginning his college head coaching career at Valdosta State, he served six years as an assistant coach and associate head coach under John Kresse in the storied College of Charleston basketball program that compiled a 153-28 record and six conference championships during Yarbrough's years as a top assistant. At SLU, Yarbrough coached the Lions to five winning seasons and a school-record five winning campaigns in the Southland Conference, along with 11 players named to all-SLC teams.
