= Pride Roofing University Center =

Multi-purpose arena in Hammond, Louisiana

University Center
- The UC
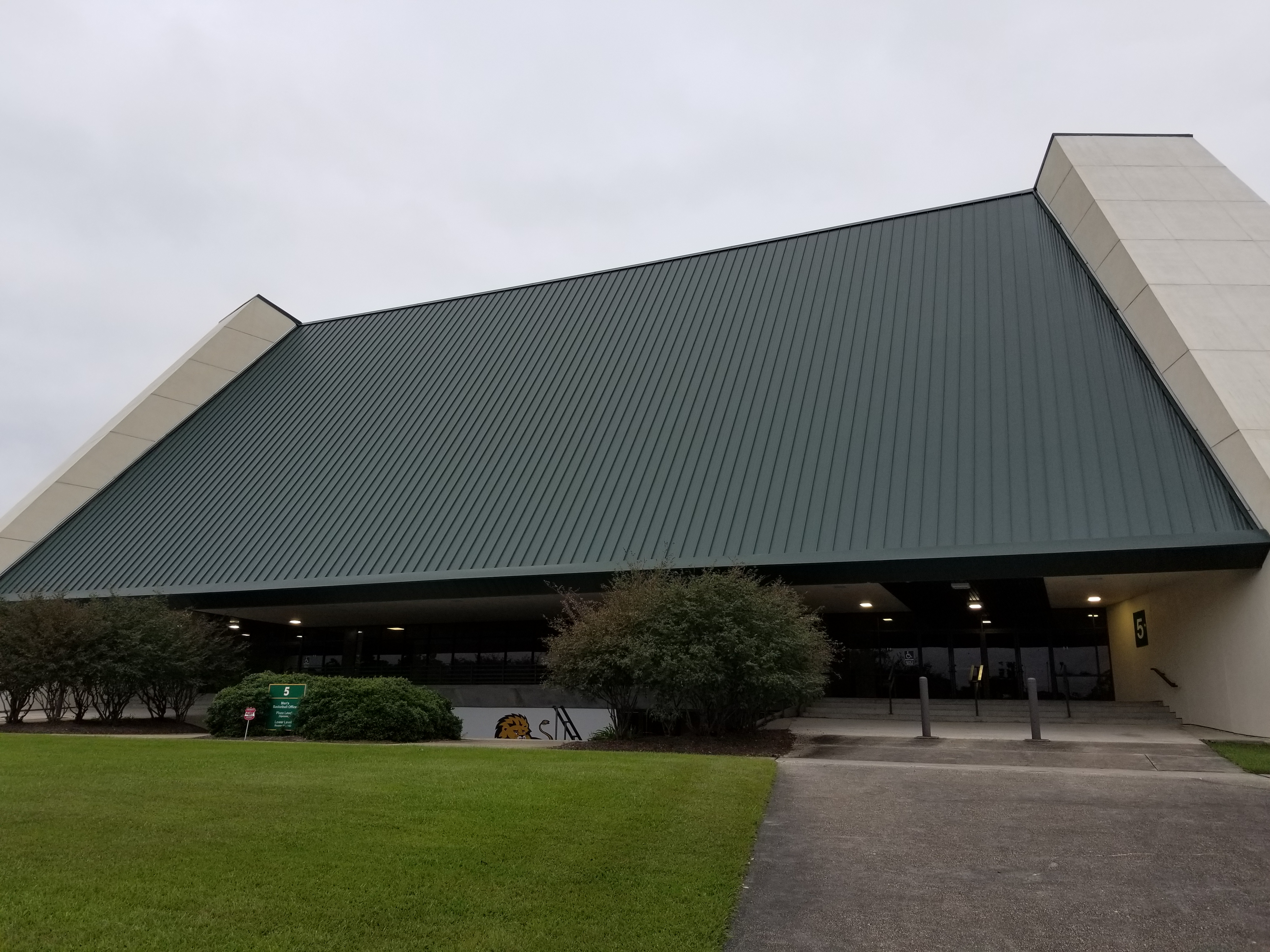
- Interactive map of University Center
- Location: N. General Pershing St. and W. University Ave. Hammond, LA 70401
- Coordinates: 30°31′12″N 90°28′22″W
- Owner: Southeastern Louisiana University
- Operator: Southeastern Louisiana University
- Capacity: Concerts: 8,961; Basketball: 7,500
- Surface: Multi-surface

Construction
- Built: 1982
- Cost: $16.3 million ($54.4 million in 2025 dollars)

Tenants
- Southeastern Louisiana Lions basketball Southeastern Louisiana Lady Lions basketball Southeastern Louisiana Lady Lions volleyball

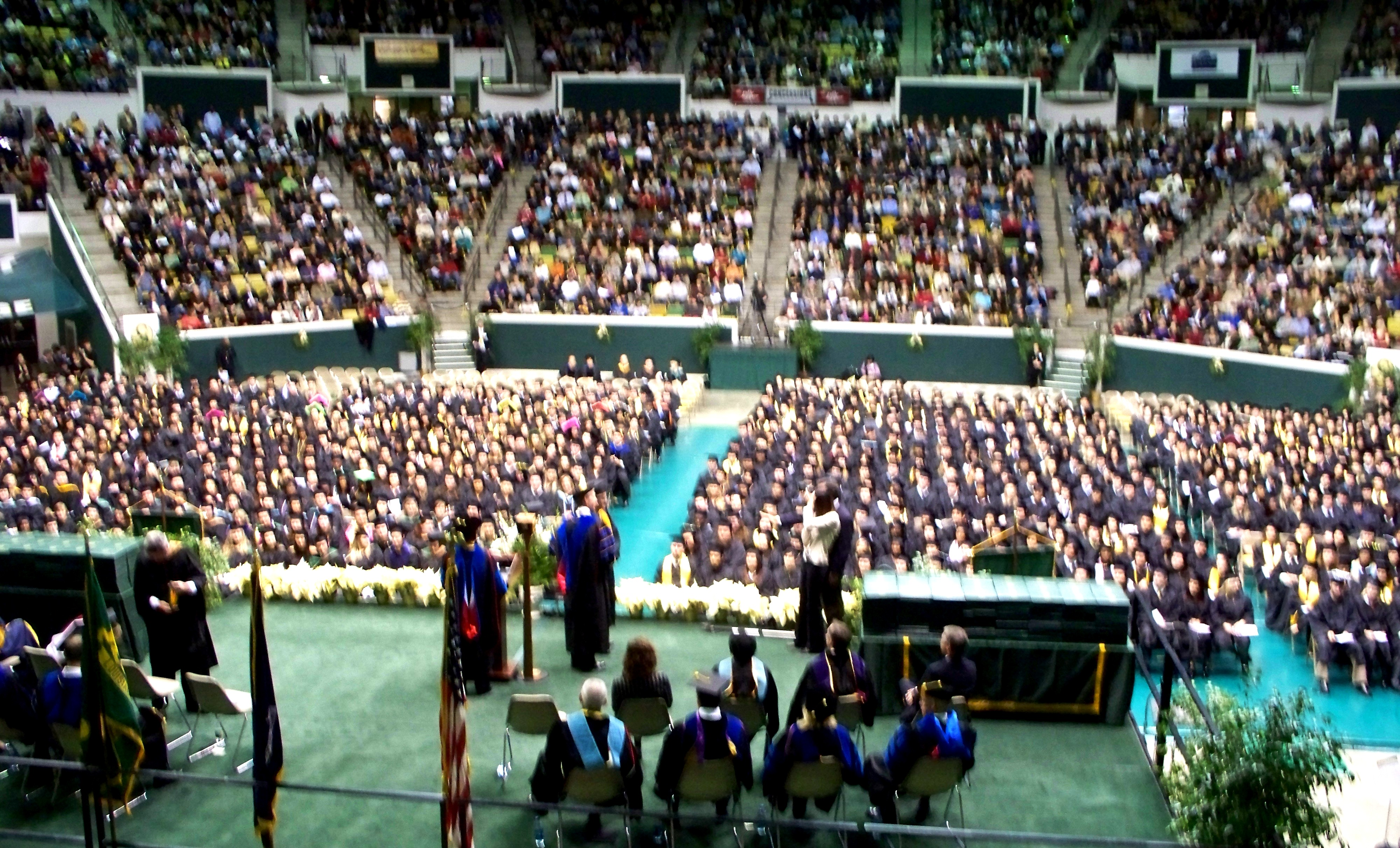
Graduation ceremony for Southeastern Louisiana University, December 12, 2009, in the University Center, Dr. John L. Crain presiding.

The University Center is a 7,500-seat multi-purpose arena in Hammond, Louisiana, United States, on the campus Southeastern Louisiana University. Often called "the UC" within the university, it was built in 1982 at a cost of $16.3 million.

It is home to Southeastern Louisiana University's Lions and Lady Lions basketball teams and Lady Lions volleyball team. It also hosts many other functions including Southeastern's commencement, a variety of concerts and community events, circuses, and rodeos.

From 2001 through 2008, the arena hosted the girls basketball state championships tournament of the Louisiana High School Athletic Association; after a 1-year hiatus at a location on another campus, the tournament returned to Southeastern and to its University Center in 2010. The tournament is well received and supported in Hammond and Tangipahoa Parish, where girls basketball has been popular for many decades. LSU coach Kim Mulkey starred at Hammond High School before a standout career at Louisiana Tech and as a member of the U.S. national team that won the gold medal at the 1984 Summer Olympics. In 2023, the university announced a 10-year sponsorship with Pride Roofing that renamed the arena.

The arena floor measures 15,000 square feet (1,400 m^{2}); the arena seats up to 8,961 for concerts. Access to the university is via multilane LA 3234 (University Avenue) from I-55.

== Gallery ==
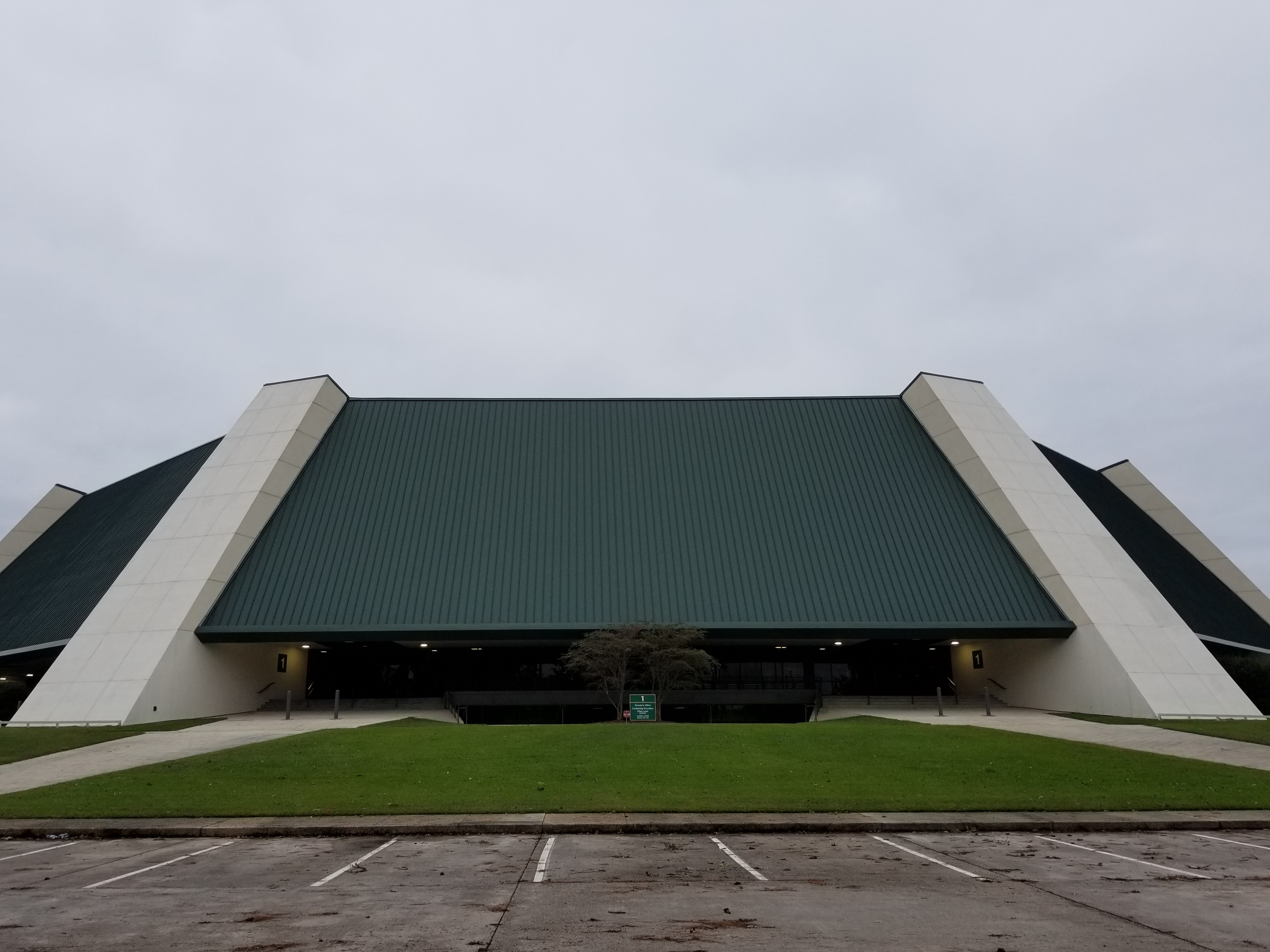
University Center-Gate 1

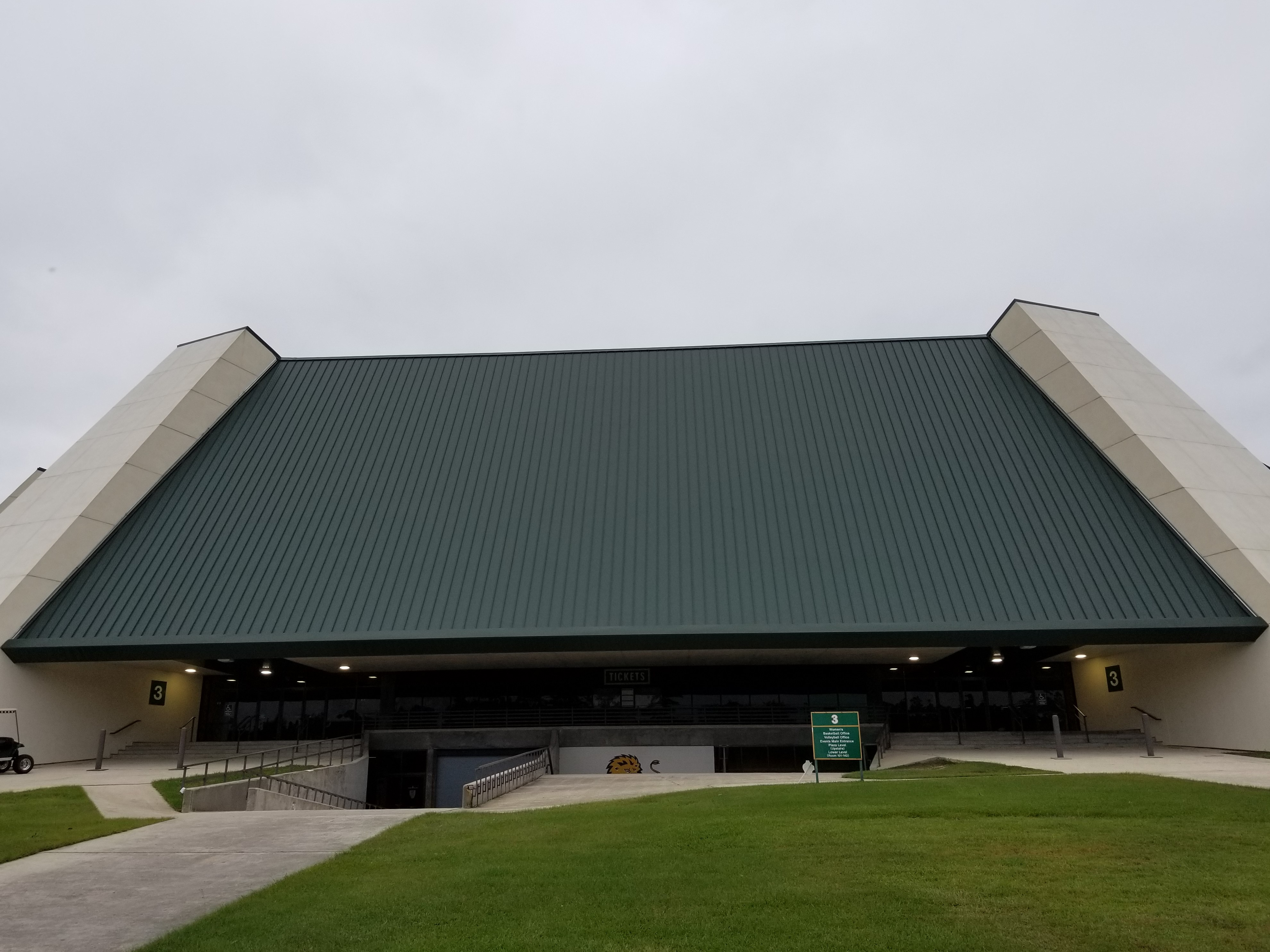
University Center-Gate 3

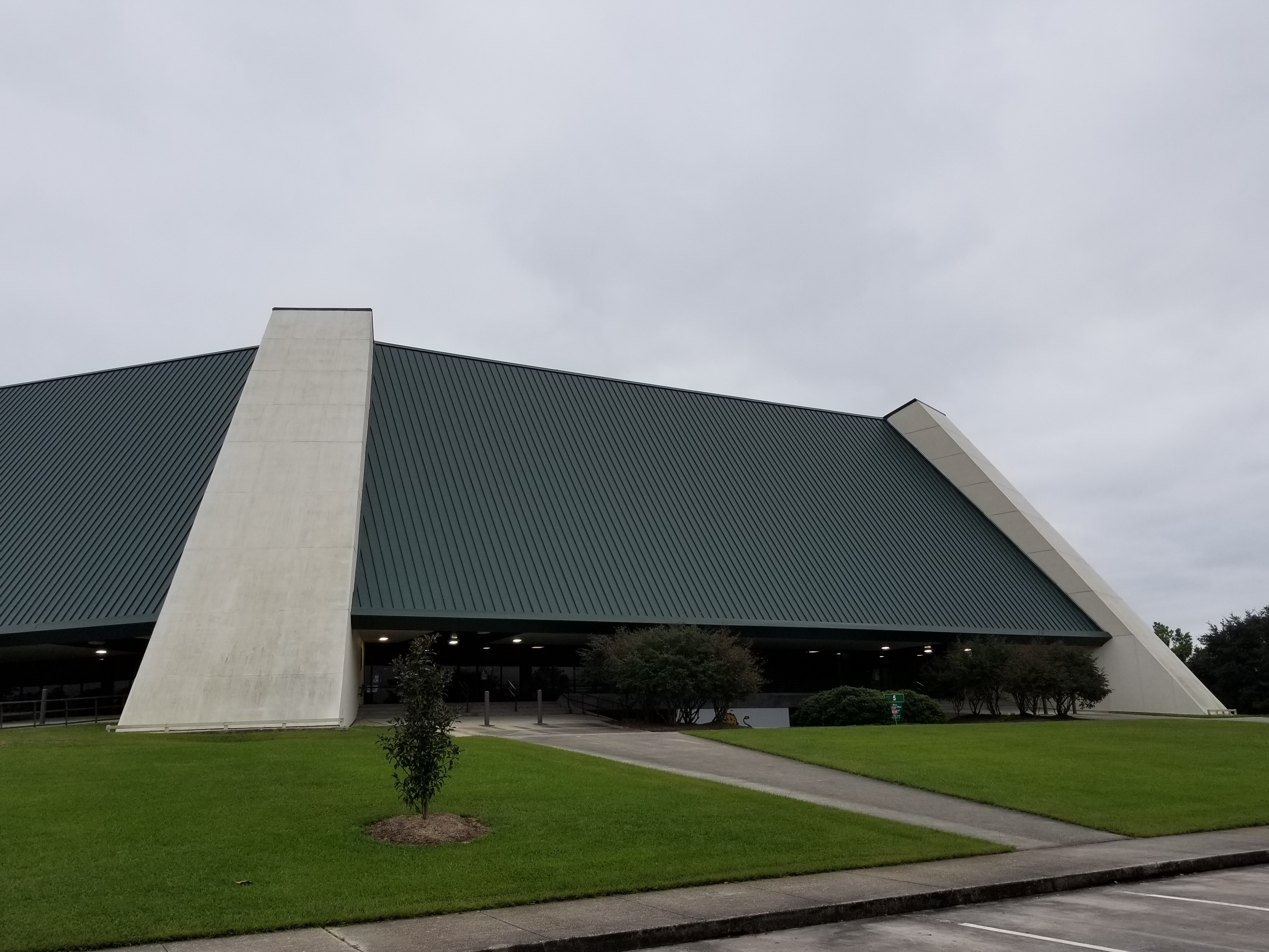
University Center-Gate 5

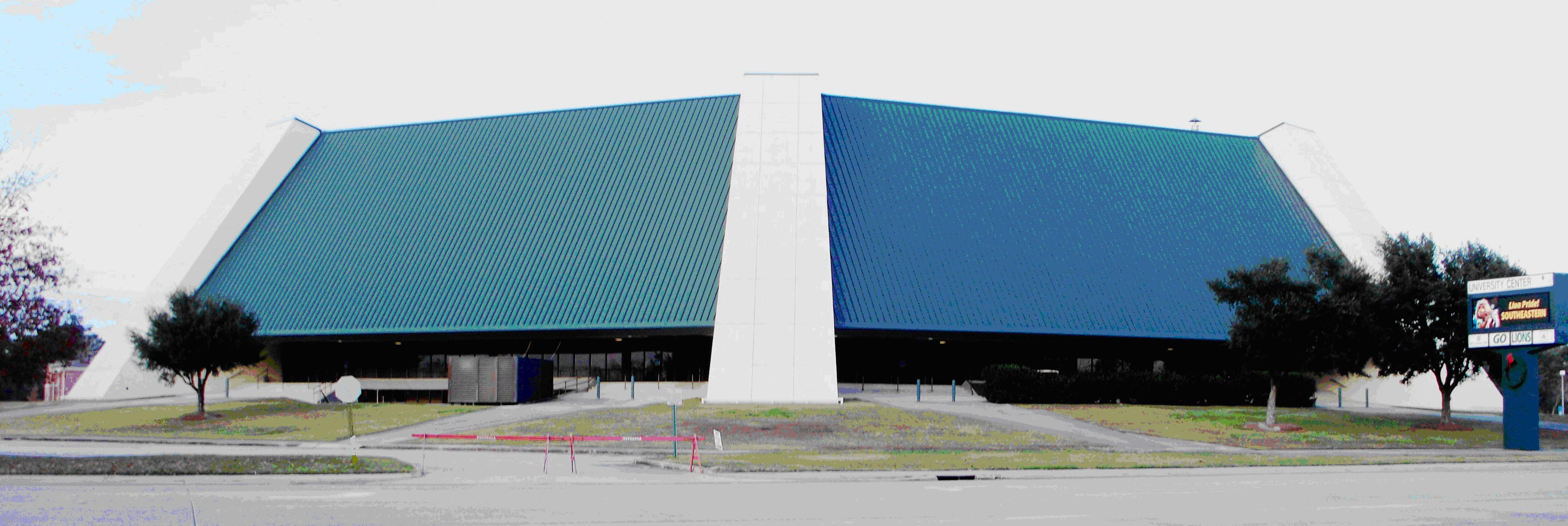
University Center-exterior

== See also ==
- List of convention centers in the United States
- List of NCAA Division I basketball arenas
- List of music venues
