= Missouri Tigers men's basketball statistical leaders =

The Missouri Tigers men's basketball statistical leaders are individual statistical leaders of the Missouri Tigers men's basketball program in various categories, including points, three-pointers, assists, blocks, rebounds, and steals. Within those areas, the lists identify single-game, single-season, and career leaders. The Tigers represent the University of Missouri in the NCAA's Southeastern Conference.

Missouri began competing in intercollegiate basketball in 1906. However, the school's record book does not generally list records from before the 1950s, as records from before this period are often incomplete and inconsistent. Since scoring was much lower in this era, and teams played much fewer games during a typical season, it is likely that few or no players from this era would appear on these lists anyway.

The NCAA did not officially record assists as a stat until the 1983–84 season, and blocks and steals until the 1985–86 season, but Missouri's record books includes players in these stats before these seasons. These lists are updated through the end of the 2020–21 season.

== Scoring ==
Career
| Rk | Player | Points | Seasons |
|---|---|---|---|
| 1 | Derrick Chievous | 2,580 | 1984–85 1985–86 1986–87 1987–88 |
| 2 | Doug Smith | 2,184 | 1987–88 1988–89 1989–90 1990–91 |
| 3 | Anthony Peeler | 1,970 | 1988–89 1989–90 1990–91 1991–92 |
| 4 | Steve Stipanovich | 1,836 | 1979–80 1980–81 1981–82 1982–83 |
| 5 | Marcus Denmon | 1,775 | 2008–09 2009–10 2010–11 2011–12 |
| 6 | Arthur Johnson | 1,759 | 2000–01 2001–02 2002–03 2003–04 |
| 7 | Melvin Booker | 1,697 | 1990–91 1991–92 1992–93 1993–94 |
| 8 | Kelly Thames | 1,689 | 1993–94 1995–96 1996–97 1997–98 |
| 9 | Clarence Gilbert | 1,685 | 1998–99 1999–00 2000–01 2001–02 |
| 10 | Rickey Paulding | 1,673 | 2000–01 2001–02 2002–03 2003–04 |

Season
| Rk | Player | Points | Season |
|---|---|---|---|
| 1 | Derrick Chievous | 821 | 1986–87 |
| 2 | Willie Smith | 783 | 1975–76 |
| 3 | Kareem Rush | 712 | 2001–02 |
| 4 | Doug Smith | 709 | 1990–91 |
| 5 | Byron Irvin | 708 | 1988–89 |
| 6 | Derrick Chievous | 701 | 1987–88 |
| 7 | Jabari Brown | 698 | 2013–14 |
| 8 | Anthony Peeler | 678 | 1991–92 |
| 9 | Derrick Chievous | 640 | 1985–86 |
| 10 | Doug Smith | 635 | 1989–90 |

Single game
| Rk | Player | Points | Season | Opponent |
|---|---|---|---|---|
| 1 | Joe Scott | 46 | 1960–61 | Nebraska |
| 2 | Doug Smith | 44 | 1989–90 | Nebraska |
| | Lionel Smith | 44 | 1956–57 | Marquette |
| 4 | Clarence Gilbert | 43 | 2000–01 | Iowa State |
| | Anthony Peeler | 43 | 1991–92 | Kansas |
| | Willie Smith | 43 | 1975–76 | Michigan (NCAA) |
| 7 | Anthony Peeler | 42 | 1989–90 | Iowa State |
| | Derrick Chievous | 42 | 1987–88 | Virginia Tech |
| 9 | John Brown | 41 | 1972–73 | Oklahoma State |
| | Charles Henke | 41 | 1960–61 | Nebraska |

== Rebounds ==
Career
| Rk | Player | Rebounds | Seasons |
|---|---|---|---|
| 1 | Arthur Johnson | 1,083 | 2000–01 2001–02 2002–03 2003–04 |
| 2 | Doug Smith | 1,053 | 1987–88 1988–89 1989–90 1990–91 |
| 3 | Steve Stipanovich | 984 | 1979–80 1980–81 1981–82 1982–83 |
| 4 | Derrick Chievous | 979 | 1984–85 1985–86 1986–87 1987–88 |
| 5 | Bill Stauffer | 964 | 1949–50 1950–51 1951–52 |
| 6 | Greg Cavener | 894 | 1981–82 1982–83 1983–84 1984–85 |
| 7 | Jevon Crudup | 874 | 1990–91 1991–92 1992–93 1993–94 |
| 8 | Curtis Berry | 811 | 1977–78 1978–79 1979–80 1980–81 |
| 9 | Al Eberhard | 806 | 1971–72 1972–73 1973–74 |
| 10 | Kelly Thames | 785 | 1993–94 1995–96 1996–97 1997–98 |

Season
| Rk | Player | Rebounds | Season |
|---|---|---|---|
| 1 | Bill Stauffer | 379 | 1951–52 |
| 2 | Bill Stauffer | 357 | 1950–51 |
| 3 | Arthur Johnson | 316 | 2003–04 |
| 4 | Al Eberhard | 313 | 1973–74 |
| 5 | Doug Smith | 311 | 1990–91 |
| 6 | Nathan Buntin | 304 | 1989–90 |
| 7 | Steve Stipanovich | 300 | 1982–83 |
| | Bob Reiter | 300 | 1954–55 |
| 9 | John Brown | 298 | 1972–73 |
| 10 | Doug Smith | 295 | 1989–90 |

Single game
| Rk | Player | Rebounds | Season | Opponent |
|---|---|---|---|---|
| 1 | Bob Reiter | 27 | 1954–55 | Kansas State |
| 2 | Gene Jones | 26 | 1966–67 | Rutgers |
| 3 | Booker Brown | 24 | 1966–67 | Detroit |
| | Tom Officer | 24 | 1965–66 | St. Louis |
| | Ned Monsees | 24 | 1964–65 | Kansas State |
| | Ned Monsees | 24 | 1964–65 | St. Louis |
| 7 | Kobe Brown | 23 | 2021–22 | Paul Quinn |
| 8 | Al Eberhard | 21 | 1973–74 | Oklahoma |
| | John Brown | 21 | 1972–73 | Kansas |
| | Charles Henke | 21 | 1960–61 | Washington Univ. (Mo.) |

== Assists ==
Career
| Rk | Player | Assists | Seasons |
|---|---|---|---|
| 1 | Phil Pressey | 580 | 2010–11 2011–12 2012–13 |
| 2 | Anthony Peeler | 497 | 1988–89 1989–90 1990–91 1991–92 |
| 3 | Melvin Booker | 488 | 1990–91 1991–92 1992–93 1993–94 |
| 4 | Larry Drew | 433 | 1976–77 1977–78 1978–79 1979–80 |
| 5 | Lee Coward | 431 | 1986–87 1987–88 1988–89 1989–90 |
| 6 | Jason Horton | 413 | 2004–05 2005–06 2006–07 2007–08 |
| 7 | Jon Sundvold | 382 | 1979–80 1980–81 1981–82 1982–83 |
| 8 | Mike Sandbothe | 380 | 1985–86 1986–87 1987–88 1988–89 |
| 9 | Lynn Hardy | 358 | 1984–85 1985–86 1986–87 1987–88 |
| 10 | Jimmy McKinney | 349 | 2002–03 2003–04 2004–05 2005–06 |

Season
| Rk | Player | Assists | Season |
|---|---|---|---|
| 1 | Phil Pressey | 240 | 2012–13 |
| 2 | Phil Pressey | 223 | 2011–12 |
| 3 | Anthony Peeler | 179 | 1989–90 |
| 4 | Lee Coward | 164 | 1988–89 |
| 5 | Larry Drew | 156 | 1979–80 |
| 6 | Wesley Stokes | 147 | 2001–02 |
| 7 | Melvin Booker | 143 | 1993–94 |
| 8 | Terrence Phillips | 142 | 2016–17 |
| 9 | Scott Sims | 142 | 1976–77 |
| 10 | Lynn Hardy | 139 | 1985–86 |

Single game
| Rk | Player | Assists | Season | Opponent |
|---|---|---|---|---|
| 1 | Phil Pressey | 19 | 2012–13 | UCLA |
| 2 | Phil Pressey | 13 | 2012–13 | Alabama |
| | Stefhon Hannah | 13 | 2006–07 | Coppin St. |
| | Melvin Booker | 13 | 1993–94 | Illinois |
| 5 | Phil Pressey | 12 | 2011–12 | Oklahoma State (Big 12) |
| | Phil Pressey | 12 | 2011–12 | Kansas |
| | Phil Pressey | 12 | 2011–12 | Texas Tech |
| | Phil Pressey | 12 | 2011–12 | Villanova |
| | John McIntyre | 12 | 1987–88 | Alabama State |
| | Larry Drew | 12 | 1979–80 | Notre Dame (NCAA) |

== Steals ==
Career
| Rk | Player | Steals | Seasons |
|---|---|---|---|
| 1 | Phil Pressey | 196 | 2010–11 2011–12 2012–13 |
| | Anthony Peeler | 196 | 1988–89 1989–90 1990–91 1991–92 |
| 3 | Brian Grawer | 195 | 1997–98 1998–99 1999–00 2000–01 |
| 4 | Lynn Hardy | 194 | 1984–85 1985–86 1986–87 1987–88 |
| 5 | Marcus Denmon | 178 | 2008–09 2009–10 2010–11 2011–12 |
| | Doug Smith | 178 | 1987–88 1988–89 1989–90 1990–91 |
| 7 | Mike Sandbothe | 172 | 1985–86 1986–87 1987–88 1988–89 |
| 8 | Jeff Hafer | 169 | 1996–97 1997–98 1998–99 1999–00 |
| 9 | Clarence Gilbert | 167 | 1998–99 1999–00 2000–01 2001–02 |
| 10 | J.T. Tiller | 166 | 2006–07 2007–08 2008–09 2009–10 |

Season
| Rk | Player | Steals | Season |
|---|---|---|---|
| 1 | D'Moi Hodge | 91 | 2022–23 |
| 2 | Lynn Hardy | 76 | 1986–87 |
| 3 | Phil Pressey | 74 | 2011–12 |
| | Lynn Hardy | 74 | 1985–86 |
| 5 | Stefhon Hannah | 72 | 2006–07 |
| 6 | J.T. Tiller | 68 | 2008–09 |
| 7 | Anthony Robinson II | 67 | 2024–25 |
| 8 | Dru Smith | 64 | 2019–20 |
| | Doug Smith | 64 | 1990–91 |
| | Byron Irvin | 64 | 1988–89 |

Single game
| Rk | Player | Steals | Season | Opponent |
|---|---|---|---|---|
| 1 | Reggie Smith | 8 | 1991–92 | Florida A&M |
| 2 | Zaire Taylor | 7 | 2009–10 | Fairleigh Dickinson |
| | J.T. Tiller | 7 | 2008–09 | Texas Tech |
| | Stefhon Hannah | 7 | 2006–07 | S.F. Austin |
| | Rickey Paulding | 7 | 2003–04 | Colorado |
| | Anthony Peeler | 7 | 1991–92 | Nebraska |
| | Mike Sandbothe | 7 | 1986–87 | Oklahoma State |
| 8 | Anthony Robinson II | 6 | 2024–25 | Long Island University |
| | D'Moi Hodge | 6 | 2022–23 | Texas A&M |
| | D'Moi Hodge | 6 | 2022–23 | Mississippi Valley State |
| | Dru Smith | 6 | 2020–21 | Florida |
| | Wes Clark | 6 | 2014–15 | UMKC |
| | Phil Pressey | 6 | 2011–12 | Baylor |
| | Phil Pressey | 6 | 2010–11 | Texas A&M (Big 12) |
| | Laurence Bowers | 6 | 2010–11 | Baylor |
| | Zaire Taylor | 6 | 2008–09 | Colorado |
| | J.T. Tiller | 6 | 2008–09 | Xavier |
| | Stefhon Hannah | 6 | 2006–07 | Arkansas |
| | Stefhon Hannah | 6 | 2006–07 | Davidson |
| | Stefhon Hannah | 6 | 2006–07 | Southern |
| | Clarence Gilbert | 6 | 1998–99 | Nebraska |
| | Brian Grawer | 6 | 1998–99 | Jackson St. |
| | Jeff Hafer | 6 | 1997–98 | Nebraska |
| | Brian Grawer | 6 | 1997–98 | Kansas |
| | Doug Smith | 6 | 1990–91 | Iowa State |
| | Mike Sandbothe | 6 | 1988–89 | Nebraska |
| | Byron Irvin | 6 | 1988–89 | Tulsa |
| | Mike Sandbothe | 6 | 1985–86 | Colorado |
| | Greg Cavener | 6 | 1982–83 | Kansas |
| | Moon McCrary | 6 | 1981–82 | Austin Peay |
| | Steve Wallace | 6 | 1978–79 | Iowa State |
| | Willie Smith | 6 | 1975–76 | Washington (NCAA) |

== Blocks ==
Career
| Rk | Player | Blocks | Seasons |
|---|---|---|---|
| 1 | Arthur Johnson | 245 | 2000–01 2001–02 2002–03 2003–04 |
| 2 | Laurence Bowers | 157 | 2008–09 2009–10 2010–11 2012–13 |
| 3 | Steve Stipanovich | 149 | 1979–80 1980–81 1981–82 1982–83 |
| 4 | Doug Smith | 129 | 1987–88 1988–89 1989–90 1990–91 |
| 5 | Travon Bryant | 119 | 2000–01 2001–02 2002–03 2003–04 |
| 6 | Jevon Crudup | 116 | 1990–91 1991–92 1992–93 1993–94 |
| 7 | Jeremiah Tilmon | 113 | 2017–18 2018–19 2019–20 2020–21 |
| 8 | Steve Moore | 105 | 2008–09 2009–10 2010–11 2011–12 |
| 9 | Gary Leonard | 95 | 1985–86 1986–87 1987–88 1988–89 |
| 10 | Chris Heller | 89 | 1989–90 1990–91 1991–92 1992–93 1993–94 |

Season
| Rk | Player | Blocks | Season |
|---|---|---|---|
| 1 | Arthur Johnson | 71 | 2001–02 |
| 2 | Arthur Johnson | 65 | 2000–01 |
| 3 | Laurence Bowers | 62 | 2010–11 |
| 4 | Arthur Johnson | 61 | 2002–03 |
| 5 | Johnathan Williams | 57 | 2013–14 |
| 6 | Steve Stipanovich | 56 | 1982–83 |
| 7 | Jontay Porter | 55 | 2017–18 |
| 8 | Alex Oriakhi | 54 | 2012–13 |
| 9 | Sammie Haley | 49 | 1994–95 |
| 10 | Arthur Johnson | 48 | 2003–04 |
| | Laurence Bowers | 48 | 2009–10 |
| | Trevon Brazile | 48 | 2021–22 |

Single game
| Rk | Player | Blocks | Season | Opponent |
|---|---|---|---|---|
| 1 | Laurence Bowers | 8 | 2010–11 | Colorado |
| | Arthur Johnson | 8 | 2000–01 | Stetson |
| 3 | Arthur Johnson | 7 | 2000–01 | Coastal Carolina |
| 4 | Trevon Brazile | 6 | 2021–22 | Illinois |
| | Jeremiah Tilmon | 6 | 2020–21 | Auburn |
| | Ricardo Ratliffe | 6 | 2010–11 | Iowa State |
| | Ricardo Ratliffe | 6 | 2010–11 | North Alabama |
| | Travon Bryant | 6 | 2003–04 | Kansas |
| | Arthur Johnson | 6 | 2003–04 | Texas |
| | Arthur Johnson | 6 | 2001–02 | Iowa State |
