= 2012–13 Missouri Tigers men's basketball team =

American college basketball season

2012–13 Missouri Tigers men's basketball

NCAA tournament, round of 64
- Conference: Southeastern Conference
- Record: 23–11 (11–7 SEC)
- Head coach: Frank Haith
- Assistant coaches: Tim Fuller; Rick Carter; Dave Leitao
- Home arena: Mizzou Arena

2012–13 Southeastern Conference men's basketball standings
	Conf.				Overall
Team	W		L	PCT	W		L	PCT
No. 14 Florida	14	–	4	.778	29	–	8	.784
Ole Miss †	12	–	6	.667	27	–	9	.750
Alabama	12	–	6	.667	23	–	13	.639
Kentucky	12	–	6	.667	21	–	12	.636
Missouri	11	–	7	.611	23	–	11	.676
Tennessee	11	–	7	.611	20	–	13	.606
Arkansas	10	–	8	.556	19	–	13	.594
LSU	9	–	9	.500	19	–	12	.613
Georgia	9	–	9	.500	15	–	17	.469
Vanderbilt	8	–	10	.444	16	–	17	.485
Texas A&M	7	–	11	.389	18	–	15	.545
South Carolina	4	–	14	.222	14	–	18	.438
Mississippi State	4	–	14	.222	10	–	22	.313
Auburn	3	–	15	.167	9	–	23	.281
† 2013 SEC tournament winner As of March 31, 2013; Rankings from AP poll

The 2012–13 Missouri Tigers men's basketball team represented the University of Missouri in the 2012–13 NCAA Division I men's basketball season. Their head coach was Frank Haith, who was in his second year at Missouri. The team played its home games at Mizzou Arena in Columbia, Missouri, and played its first season in the Southeastern Conference after leaving the Big 12 Conference.

== Roster ==
2012–13 Missouri Tigers men's basketball team
Players
Coaches

Pos.	#	Name	Height	Weight	Year	Previous school	Hometown
G	1	Phil Pressey	5 ft 10 in (1.78 m)	175 lb (79 kg)	Jr	Dallas Episcopal	Dallas, TX
F	3	Tony Criswell	6 ft 9 in (2.06 m)	230 lb (104 kg)	Jr	Douglass; UAB/Independence CC	Oklahoma City, OK
G	5	Keion Bell	6 ft 3 in (1.91 m)	200 lb (91 kg)	RS Sr	Pasadena; Pepperdine	Los Angeles, CA
G	10	Domonique Bull	6 ft 4 in (1.93 m)	185 lb (84 kg)	Fr	Tilton School	Worcester, MA
F	14	Negus Webster-Chan	6 ft 7 in (2.01 m)	195 lb (88 kg)	Fr	Huntington Prep	Scarborough, ON, Canada
F	21	Laurence Bowers	6 ft 8 in (2.03 m)	221 lb (100 kg)	RS Sr	St. George's	Memphis, TN
G	23	Jordan Clarkson (redshirt)	6 ft 4 in (1.93 m)	180 lb (82 kg)	Jr	Wagner; Tulsa	San Antonio, TX
C	25	Eric Moeller	6 ft 10 in (2.08 m)	205 lb (93 kg)	Fr	De Smet	Ladue, MO
F	31	Danny Feldmann	6 ft 9 in (2.06 m)	215 lb (98 kg)	RS So	Helias; Columbia	Jefferson City, MO
G	32	Jabari Brown	6 ft 5 in (1.96 m)	205 lb (93 kg)	RS Fr	Oakland; Oregon	Oakland, CA
G	33	Earnest Ross	6 ft 5 in (1.96 m)	222 lb (101 kg)	RS Jr	Panther Creek; Auburn	Cary, NC
F	35	Stefan Jankovic	6 ft 9 in (2.06 m)	200 lb (91 kg)	Fr	Huntington Prep	Mississauga, ON, Canada
F/C	42	Alex Oriakhi	6 ft 9 in (2.06 m)	245 lb (111 kg)	Sr	Tilton School; Connecticut	Lowell, MA
C	44	Ryan Rosburg	6 ft 9 in (2.06 m)	245 lb (111 kg)	Fr	Marquette	Chesterfield, MO

Head coach

- Frank Haith (Elon)

Assistant coach(es)

- Tim Fuller (Wake Forest)
- Rick Carter (Michigan State)
- Dave Leitao (Northeastern)

Legend

- (C) Team captain
- (S) Suspended
- (I) Ineligible
- (W) Walk-on
- Injured
- Current redshirt

Roster
Last update: 2012-07-08

Notes:

- For 2012–13 commitments, see the Missouri recruiting page at rivals.com, part of Yahoo! Sports.
- Jabari Brown transferred from Oregon after that school's fall 2011 term. He became eligible once Missouri's 2012 fall semester ended on December 14.
- Jordan Clarkson sat out the 2012–13 season due to NCAA transfer rules. He will have two more years of eligibility.
- Alex Oriakhi was immediately eligible this season because Connecticut was barred from NCAA postseason play in 2012–13, his only remaining season of eligibility, due to Academic Progress Rate violations.
- Michael Dixon Jr., a senior guard who was expected to start, was suspended before the season for an unnamed violation of team rules. He had also been accused of sexual assault in August 2012, but local prosecutors decided not to file charges. On November 30, Missouri announced that Dixon, who had not played this season, had left the school and would transfer.

== Schedule ==
Date time, TV	Rank^{#}	Opponent^{#}	Result	Record	High points	High rebounds	High assists	Site (attendance) city, state
Exhibition
Oct. 29, 2012; 7:00 p.m., FSN	No. 14	Northwest Missouri State	W 91-58	0–0	22 – Ross	10 – Oriakhi	11 – Pressey	Mizzou Arena (7,741); Columbia, MO
Nov. 4, 2012; 2:00 p.m., FSN	No. 14	Missouri Southern	W 86-60	0-0	20 – Jankovic	8 – Bowers	7 – Pressey	Mizzou Arena (7,324); Columbia, MO
Regular season
Nov. 10, 2012*; 4:00 p.m., FSN	No. 14	SIU Edwardsville	W 83–69	1–0	20 – Bowers	15 – Oriakhi	9 – Pressey	Mizzou Arena (10,054); Columbia, MO
Nov. 13, 2012*; 7:00 p.m., FSN	No. 14	Alcorn State	W 91–54	2–0	21 – Pressey	11 – Webster-Chan	4 – Jankovic	Mizzou Arena (8,013); Columbia, MO
Nov. 16, 2012*; 7:00 p.m., FSN	No. 14	Nicholls State	W 74–54	3–0	17 – Oriakhi	10 – Oriakhi	3 – Pressey	Mizzou Arena (9,519); Columbia, MO
Nov. 22, 2012*; 12:00 p.m., AXS TV	No. 13	vs. Stanford; Battle 4 Atlantis	W 78–70	4–0	19 – Bowers	11 – Ross	8 – Pressey	Atlantis Resort (3,217); Nassau, Bahamas
Nov. 23, 2012*; 8:30 p.m., NBCSN	No. 13	vs. No. 2 Louisville; Battle 4 Atlantis	L 61–84	4–1	15 – Oriakhi, Pressey	8 – Oriakhi	7 – Pressey	(3,153); Atlantis Resort
Nov. 24, 2012*; 6:00 p.m., NBCSN	No. 13	vs. VCU; Battle 4 Atlantis	W 68–65	5–1	14 – Bowers	11 – Bowers	8 – Pressey	(3,451); Atlantis Resort
Dec. 1, 2012*; 2:00 p.m., FSN/ESPN3	No. 16	Appalachian State	W 72–56	6–1	23 – Bowers	9 – Ross	7 – Pressey	Mizzou Arena (9,388); Columbia, MO
Dec. 4, 2012*; 7:00 p.m., FSN/ESPN3	No. 12	SE Missouri State	W 81–65	7–1	26 – Bowers	11 – Bell	5 – Pressey	Mizzou Arena (7,905); Columbia, MO
Dec. 8, 2012*; 2:00 p.m., FSN/ESPN3	No. 12	Tennessee State	W 68–38	8–1	18 – Bowers	10 – Bowers, Oriakhi	4 – Webster-Chan	Mizzou Arena (10,338); Columbia, MO
Dec. 17, 2012*; 7:00 p.m., FSN/ESPN3	No. 12	South Carolina State	W 102–51	9–1	16 – Ross	11 – Oriakhi	6 – Pressey	Mizzou Arena (10,613); Columbia, MO
Dec. 22, 2012*; 5:00 p.m., ESPN2	No. 12	vs. No. 10 Illinois; Braggin' Rights	W 82–73	10–1	23 – Bowers	14 – Oriakhi	11 – Pressey	Scottrade Center (21,933); St. Louis, MO
Dec. 28, 2012*; 9:00 p.m., ESPN2	No. 7	at UCLA	L 94–97 ^{OT}	10–2	19 – Pressey	9 – Bowers	19 – Pressey	Pauley Pavilion (11,854); Los Angeles, CA
Jan. 5, 2013*; 3:00 p.m., FSN/ESPN3	No. 12	Bucknell	W 66–64	11–2	26 – Pressey	8 – Bowers	5 – Pressey	Mizzou Arena (13,856); Columbia, MO
SEC Regular Season
Jan. 8, 2013; 6:00 p.m., ESPN	No. 10	Alabama	W 84–68	12–2 (1–0)	22 – Brown	10 – Oriakhi	13 – Pressey	Mizzou Arena (13,895); Columbia, MO
Jan. 12, 2013; 7:00 p.m., FSN	No. 10	at Ole Miss	L 49–64	12–3 (1–1)	13 – Brown	7 – Bell, Brown	5 – Pressey	Tad Smith Coliseum (9,173); Oxford, MS
Jan. 16, 2013; 7:00 p.m., SECN/ESPN3	No. 17	Georgia	W 79–62	13–3 (2–1)	15 – Brown, Ross	8 – Oriakhi	6 – Pressey	Mizzou Arena (12,797); Columbia, MO
Jan 19, 2013; 1:00 p.m., ESPN	No. 17	at No. 10 Florida	L 52–83	13–4 (2–2)	16 – Brown	5 – Criswell	6 – Pressey	O'Connell Center (12,597); Gainesville, FL
Jan. 22, 2013; 6:00 p.m., ESPNU	No. 22	South Carolina	W 71–65	14–4 (3–2)	21 – Ross	11 – Oriakhi	7 – Pressey	Mizzou Arena (11,830); Columbia, MO
Jan. 26, 2013; 4:00 p.m., ESPNU	No. 22	Vanderbilt	W 81–59	15–4 (4–2)	21 – Brown	12 – Oriakhi	6 – Pressey	Mizzou Arena (15,061); Columbia, MO
Jan. 30, 2013; 7:00 p.m., SECN/ESPN3	No. 17	at LSU	L 70–73	15–5 (4–3)	25 – Pressey	9 – Criswell	5 – Pressey	Pete Maravich Assembly Center (8,804); Baton Rouge, LA
Feb. 2, 2013; 12:45 p.m., SECN/ESPN3	No. 17	Auburn	W 91–77	16–5 (5–3)	24 – Bell	6 – Oriakhi	10 – Pressey	Mizzou Arena (12,313); Columbia, MO
Feb. 7, 2013; 8:00 p.m., ESPN2	No. 21	at Texas A&M	L 68–70	16–6 (5–4)	15 – Oriakhi	8 – Oriakhi	4 – Pressey	Reed Arena (5,484); College Station, TX
Feb. 9, 2013; 12:00 p.m., CBS	No. 21	Ole Miss	W 98–79	17–6 (6–4)	22 – Oriakhi, Pressey	18 – Oriakhi	4 – Pressey	Mizzou Arena (14,013); Columbia, MO
Feb. 13, 2013; 7:00 p.m., SECN/ESPN3		at Mississippi State	W 78–36	18–6 (7–4)	24 – Bell	10 – Oriakhi	8 – Pressey	Humphrey Coliseum (6,007); Starkville, MS
Feb. 16, 2013; 3:00 p.m., ESPN		at Arkansas	L 71–73	18–7 (7–5)	25 – Bell	11 – Oriakhi	3 – Brown, Ross	Bud Walton Arena (19,004); Fayetteville, AR
Feb. 19, 2013; 8:00 p.m., ESPN		No. 5 Florida	W 63–60	19–7 (8–5)	17 – Bowers	10 – Bowers	10 – Pressey	Mizzou Arena (15,061); Columbia, MO
Feb. 23, 2013; 8:00 p.m., ESPN		at Kentucky; ESPN College GameDay	L 83–90 ^{OT}	19–8 (8–6)	27 – Pressey	15 – Oriakhi	10 – Pressey	Rupp Arena (24,380); Lexington, KY
Feb. 28, 2013; 8:00 p.m., ESPN2		at South Carolina	W 90–68	20–8 (9–6)	24 – Bell	5 – Pressey, Criswell	9 – Pressey	Colonial Life Arena (9,360); Columbia, SC
Mar. 2, 2013; 3:00 p.m., SECN/ESPN3		LSU	W 89–76	21–8 (10–6)	23 – Bowers	10 – Bowers, Oriakhi	8 – Pressey	Mizzou Arena (14,212); Columbia, MO
Mar. 5, 2013; 6:00 p.m., ESPN		Arkansas	W 93–63	22–8 (11–6)	24 – Bowers	11 – Bowers	6 – Pressey	Mizzou Arena (15,061); Columbia, MO
Mar. 9, 2013; 3:00 p.m., ESPN		at Tennessee	L 62–64	22–9 (11–7)	20 – Bowers	6 – Oriakhi, Ross	9 – Pressey	Thompson–Boling Arena (21,767); Knoxville, TN
2013 SEC Tournament
Mar. 14, 2013; 9:20 p.m., SECN/ABC/ESPN3	(6)	vs. (11) Texas A&M; Second Round	W 62–50	23–9	13 – Oriakhi	10 – Oriakhi, Ross	5 – Pressey	Bridgestone Arena (11,798); Nashville, TN
Mar. 15, 2013; 9:00 p.m., SECN/ESPN3	(6)	vs. (3) Ole Miss; Quarterfinals	L 62–64	23–10	16 – Oriakhi	9 – Oriakhi	7 – Pressey	Bridgestone Arena (18,192); Nashville, TN
2013 NCAA tournament
Mar. 21, 2013*; 8:34 p.m., TBS	(9 MW)	vs. (8 MW) Colorado State; Second Round	L 72–84	23–11	20 – Pressey	4 – Bowers, Criswell	7 – Pressey	Rupp Arena (16,632); Lexington
*Non-conference game. ^{#}Rankings from AP Poll. (#) Tournament seedings in parentheses. All times are in Central Time. (#) during NCAA Tournament is seed with Region MW=Midwest.

=== Summer European Exhibition Tour ===
Missouri competed in an exhibition trip to Europe in August. The NCAA allows teams 10 extra practices before international exhibition tours like these. With many new players Coach Haith wanted to use the extra playing time and practices to help build team chemistry similar to what Mizzou did in 2008–09 with the Canadian tour. The 08–09 team ended up 31–7 and made the NCAA tournament's Elite EightSource:

=== 2012 Battle 4 Atlantis ===
On Thanksgiving weekend (Nov. 22–24), Missouri participated in a tournament held in the Bahamas. The eight-team field has been announced as Missouri, Stanford, Memphis, Northern Iowa, Duke, Minnesota, VCU, and Louisville.Source:
