= Laurence Bowers =

American professional basketball player

Personal information
- Born: April 19, 1990 (age 36) Memphis, Tennessee
- Listed height: 6 ft 8 in (2.03 m)
- Listed weight: 227 lb (103 kg)

Career information
- High school: Elliston Baptist (Memphis, Tennessee); St. George's (Collierville, Tennessee)
- College: Missouri (2008–2013)
- NBA draft: 2013: undrafted
- Playing career: 2013–2018
- Position: Power forward

Career history
- 2013–2015: Hapoel Holon
- 2015–2016: Orlandina Basket
- 2016–2017: Basket Club Ferrara
- 2017–2018: Pallacanestro Trieste

Career highlights
- Second-team All-SEC (2013); Big 12 All-Defensive Team (2011)

Laurence Rochelle Bowers (born April 19, 1990) is a retired American professional basketball player. He played college basketball at Missouri.

== Early years ==
A Memphis native, Bowers was born to Laurence Young and Nancy Bowers. His uncle, Arlyn Bowers, was a key member of the 1989–90 Arkansas Razorbacks team that reached the Final Four of the 1990 NCAA tournament.

Bowers initially attended Elliston Baptist Academy in Memphis as a freshman and sophomore, earning all-state honors both years in both basketball and baseball (as a pitcher). He then transferred to St. George's Independent School in nearby Collierville, where, as a senior, he led the basketball team to a 25–3 record and the Tennessee Division II State semi-finals while averaging 19.8 points, 12.4 rebounds and 3.7 blocks per game. In addition to being named all-state for the fourth straight year, he was a finalist for the Div. II Tennessee Mr. Basketball award (won by teammate Elliot Williams) and was a nominee for the McDonald's All-American Game. Considered a three-star recruit by Rivals.com, Bowers received scholarship offers from Arkansas, Marquette, George Mason, New Mexico and UTEP, ultimately committing to play for Mike Anderson and the Missouri Tigers.

== College career ==
Bowers played with Mizzou from 2008–2013, finishing as the second all-time leader in blocked shots. Missouri reached the NCAA tournament all five years. Along with Marcus Denmon, Kim English, and Steve Moore, he was part of the senior class that won 107 games, more than any other class in Mizzou basketball history. In May 2012, he completed his undergraduate degree in sociology, and later became the first ever Mizzou scholarship basketball player to get a master's degree, majoring in health education & promotion.

=== Freshman and sophomore seasons ===
Bowers did not play much his freshman season, averaging 3.2 points and 2.1 rebounds in just under 7 minutes per game as a backup to seniors DeMarre Carroll and Leo Lyons. He did, however, score a season-high 16 points against Colorado on January 14, 2009, and scored another 16 points in just 15 minutes on 7–9 shooting in a February 25 home win against Kansas State. The Tigers won a school-record 31 games, won the Big 12 tournament and reached the Elite Eight of the 2009 NCAA tournament. Bowers later said of his freshman year: "it was the greatest feeling ever as far as my basketball career."

The following year, he played in 34 games, finishing third on the team in scoring (10.2 ppg) and second in rebounding (5.7 rpg). For his production off the bench, he was named to the Big 12 All-Reserve Team.

=== Junior season ===
His junior season was Bowers's breakout year; he started 27 games, averaging 11.6 points, 6.1 rebounds and 1.8 blocks per game. He was named to the Big 12 All-Defensive Team and honorable mention All-Big 12. In addition to leading the team in rebounding, his 62 blocked shots was good for second in the Big 12 and the third most in school history. He also tied the school record by blocking eight shots against Colorado on January 8, 2011. At the conclusion of the season, he and Kim English both declared for the 2011 NBA draft. However, a month later, they both announced that they would be returning to Mizzou for their senior season. They cited the looming lockout as their reason.

=== Senior season ===
Before his senior season, Bowers suffered a season-ending injury in early October 2011 when tore his ACL in his left knee during pre-season workouts. Forced to red-shirt his senior year, he continued traveling with the team, and earned Academic All-Big 12 honors for his work in the classroom. Although the Tigers finished 2nd in the Big 12 and won the Big 12 tournament, they were defeated in the first round of the 2012 NCAA tournament by 15-seed Norfolk State.

In his final season, Bowers averaged 14.1 points, 6.1 rebounds and 1.2 blocks per game, earning second team all-SEC honors and the team MVP award. He did not participate in Missouri's Summer European Exhibition Tour in August, instead returning during the normal exhibition pre-season games at home. He wore a left knee brace for the first 14 games to protect his repaired knee, and suffered an injury scare in January 2013 when he sprained his right MCL in a game against Alabama. He missed five games, and played with yet another knee brace (now on his right knee) for the remaining 14 games. However, for the third straight year, his Tigers were eliminated in the first round of the NCAA Tournament; Missouri was defeated 72–84 by Colorado State in Bower's final collegiate game. He played 31 minutes and scored seven points.

== Professional career ==
In preparation for the 2013 NBA draft, Bowers moved to Bradenton, Florida to train at the IMG Academy, sharing a room with future NBA player and fellow Memphis native Adonis Thomas. He participated in pre-draft workouts with the Washington Wizards, but was not able to play in the Portsmouth Invitational due to a wrist injury. Bowers ultimately went undrafted. He later signed a Summer League contract with the Memphis Grizzlies. In six games, Bowers averaged 4.3 points and 2.3 rebounds in 11.5 minutes per game, but was waived before the start of the season.

=== Hapoel Holon ===
After being unsuccessful in securing another NBA contract, Bowers signed a one-year deal with Israeli club Hapoel Holon in July 2013. He played in 31 games, and helped Hapoel Holon reach the postseason while averaging 12.9 points, 6.2 rebounds and 1.5 assists per contest. In the offseason, he returned to Columbia, Missouri to volunteer at youth summer basketball camps, similar to what he did after he tore his ACL in 2011. He also underwent wrist surgery for the injury he suffered during his sophomore year of college. In December 2014, after only seven games back with Hapoel Holon, averaging 10.6 points and 5.3 rebounds, Bowers was released by the team in order to make room for the signing of former St. John's player Sean Evans. In April 2015 Bowers rejoined Hapoel Holon after his teammate Tony Crocker broke his hand. Bowers remained in Holon until the team was eliminated in the first round of the playoffs of the 2014–15 season. Bowers started in three of the team's four playoff games.

=== Orlandina Basket ===
After almost a year off from basketball (during which he opened his own basketball camp), he signed with Orlandina Basket of the Italian Lega Basket Serie A in August 2015.

== Personal life ==
After his grandmother died in early 2007, Bowers scored 23 points against The Webb School in his first high school game back in her honor.

Bowers founded and runs his own company, LBO Sports LLC, which organizes a variety of coed summer basketball camps throughout Missouri and Tennessee.
