= Clarence Gilbert =

American basketball player (born 1980)

Personal information
- Born: January 15, 1980 Fort Lauderdale, Florida, U.S.
- Listed height: 6 ft 2 in (1.88 m)
- Listed weight: 195 lb (88 kg)

Career information
- College: University of Missouri (1998–2002)
- NBA draft: 2002: undrafted
- Playing career: 2002–2011
- Position: Guard

Career history
- 2002–2003: VL Pesaro
- 2003–2004: Krka Novo Mesto
- 2005: Ionikos
- 2005: Hapoel Tel Aviv
- 2005–2006: Darüşşafaka
- 2006–2007: Bosna
- 2007–2008: Baloncesto León
- 2010: Fluminense
- 2010–2011: Falco KC Szombathely

Clarence Oliver Gilbert (born January 15, 1980) is an American former professional basketball player. A guard, he played college basketball for the University of Missouri and spent his professional career playing internationally in Europe and South America.

== Early life ==
Gilbert was born in Fort Lauderdale, Florida. He attended Dillard High School in Fort Lauderdale, where he played high school basketball before committing to play at the collegiate level.

== College career ==
Gilbert played college basketball at the University of Missouri from 1998 to 2002. During his senior season, he received Big 12 Conference recognition, including being named Big 12 Player of the Week in December 2001.

== Professional career ==
After going undrafted in the 2002 NBA Draft, Gilbert began a professional career overseas. He played for multiple teams across Europe, including clubs in Italy, Slovenia, Greece, Israel, Turkey, Bosnia and Herzegovina, Spain, and Hungary, as well as in Brazil.

During the 2003–04 season, Gilbert competed in the EuroLeague with Krka Novo Mesto, where he averaged 10.3 points, 2.2 rebounds, and 1.7 assists per game.

== Playing style ==
Gilbert played primarily as a guard and was known for his scoring ability and adaptability, allowing him to compete in a variety of international basketball systems.

== Retirement ==
Gilbert retired from professional basketball following the 2010–11 season after playing for Falco KC Szombathely in Hungary.
