= Johnathan Williams =

American basketball player (born 1995)

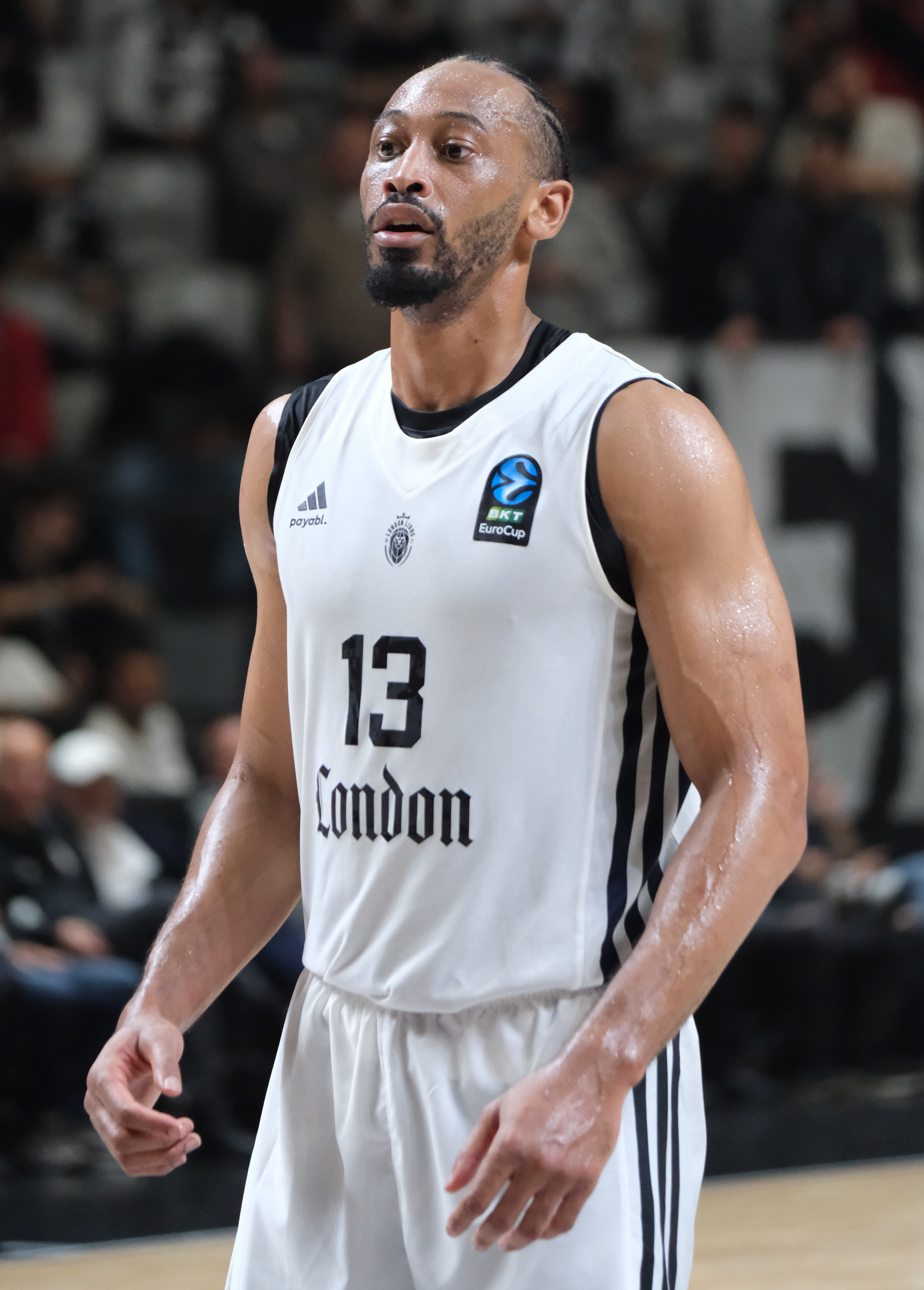
- Williams with the London Lions in 2025

No. 13 – Cholet Basket
- Position: Power forward / center
- League: LNB Élite; Champions League

Personal information
- Born: May 22, 1995 (age 31) Memphis, Tennessee, U.S.
- Listed height: 6 ft 9 in (2.06 m)
- Listed weight: 228 lb (103 kg)

Career information
- High school: Southwind (Memphis, Tennessee)
- College: Missouri (2013–2015); Gonzaga (2016–2018)
- NBA draft: 2018: undrafted
- Playing career: 2018–present

Career history
- 2018–2019: Los Angeles Lakers
- 2018–2019: →South Bay Lakers
- 2019: Maccabi Rishon LeZion
- 2019–2020: Washington Wizards
- 2020: →Capital City Go-Go
- 2020–2021: Galatasaray
- 2021: Niners Chemnitz
- 2021–2022: Dolomiti Energia Trento
- 2022–2023: Fighting Eagles Nagoya
- 2023–2024: Phoenix Super LPG Fuel Masters
- 2024: Toyama Grouses
- 2024: Veltex Shizuoka
- 2024–2025: Chiba Jets
- 2025: Qadsia SC
- 2025–2026: London Lions
- 2026: Suwon KT Sonicboom
- 2026: Phoenix Super LPG Fuel Masters
- 2026–present: Cholet Basket

Career highlights
- PBA Best Import of the Conference (2023–24 Commissioner's); 2× First-team All-WCC (2017, 2018)
- Stats at NBA.com
- Stats at Basketball Reference
Medals
Men's basketball
Representing the United States
FIBA U17 World Championship
Gold medal – first place	2012 Lithuania
FIBA Americas U16 Championship
Gold medal – first place	2011 Mexico

Johnathan Lee Williams III (born May 22, 1995) is an American professional basketball player for Cholet Basket of the French LNB Élite. He played college basketball for the Gonzaga Bulldogs, and the Missouri Tigers.

== High school career ==
Williams attended Southwind High School in Memphis, Tennessee for four years, finishing his high school tenure with an 88–17 record and earning a starting spot on the basketball team from the get-go in his freshman year. As a freshman, he averaged 10.2 points and 9.5 rebounds, leading his squad to a 26–5 record and second-place at state, and was named an honorable mention freshman All-American by Max Preps. During his sophomore year, Williams averaged 17.3 points, 11.5 rebounds, 2.1 assists, and 3 blocks, while 52 percent from the field, 48 percent from 3-point, and 80 percent from the free-throw line, as well as a 26–6 record and third-place at the state tournament. As a junior, he averaged 15.7 points, 10.2 rebounds, 2.6 assists, 2.6 blocks, and 1.1 assists, while guiding his team to a 28–5 record and an appearance in the state quarterfinals. Williams capped off his incredible high school career by averaging 18.9 points and 9.5 rebounds, while leading Southwind to a 34–6 record and a state title. He earned all-state honors by the Tennessee Sports Writers Association in 2011, 2012, and 2013.

=== Recruiting ===
"Johnathan is so versatile on the floor and has a number of ways he can impact a basketball game. His size and skillset are unique and he can present mismatch problems for opponents. He is smooth on the perimeter and is long and active and really has a great feel for how to attack his opponent and keep his teammates involved. Off the court Johnathan is just such a complete young man. He comes from a tremendous family and has a great sense of what it takes to be a leader on the court, in the classroom and amongst his teammates."

— Frank Haith, Missouri Head Coach.

After taking official visits to Georgetown, Missouri, Tennessee, Michigan State, and George Mason, Johnathan Williams commit to Missouri. Williams signed with Missouri during the early signing period in November 2012.

College recruiting
Name	Hometown	School	Height	Weight	Commit date
Johnathan Williams III; PF	Memphis, TN	Southwind	6 ft 9 in (2.06 m)	210 lb (95 kg)	Nov 14, 2012
Johnathan Williams III; PF	Recruit ratings: Scout: Rivals: 247Sports: ESPN: (87)				
Overall recruit ranking: Scout: #34 Rivals: #42 247Sports: #47 ESPN: #55
Note: In many cases, Scout, Rivals, 247Sports, On3, and ESPN may conflict in their listings of height and weight.; In these cases, the average was taken. ESPN grades are on a 100-point scale.; Sources: "2013 Missouri Rivals Commits". Rivals.; "2013 Missouri Scout Commits". Scout.; "2013 Missouri ESPN Commits". ESPN.; "Scout.com Team Recruiting Rankings". Scout.; "2013 Team Ranking". Rivals.; "2013 Missouri 24/7 Sports Commits". 247Sports.

== College career ==
=== Freshman season ===
As a freshman at Missouri, Johnathan Williams helped to lead to Tigers to an appearance in the NIT and a 23–13 record, and started every game, while averaging 5.8 points, along with team highs of 6.5 rebounds and 1.6 blocks per game. His 227 total rebounds were 11th best in the SEC in 2013–14 and the 4th-most as a freshman at Missouri. His 57 total blocks were 5th-best in the SEC, along with the 8th-best nationally among freshmen, 2nd most by a freshman at Missouri and 5th-most as a Tiger regardless of class.

In his first collegiate game in an 89–53 win over Southeastern Louisiana on November 8, 2013, Williams posted 7 points, 6 rebounds, and 1 assist on 2-for-2 field goals and 3-of-4 free throws. On November 23, Williams grabbed career-highs of 17 rebounds and 2 steals to go along with 7 points, 3 blocks, and 2 assists on 3-for-10 field goals and 1-of-4 free throws in a win over Gardner-Webb. He had a season-high 14 points, along with 8 rebounds, 1 assist, and 1 steal on 3-for-3 from the field and 8-for-10 from the charity stripe in a win against Northwestern on November 28. On December 7 in an 80–71 win over #18 UCLA, he had 10 points, 15 rebounds, 2 blocks, 1 steal, and 1 assist on 3-of-5 field goals and 4-of-6 free throws. On March 5, 2014, Williams blocked a career-high 5 shots, along with 7 points and 8 rebounds on 3-of-7 field goals and 1-of-2 free throws, in a win over Texas A&M. In a double-overtime win over Texas A&M in the SEC Tournament on March 13, Williams dished out a career-high 4 assists to go along with a double-double (11 points and 15 rebounds), 2 blocks, and 1 steal on 3-of-7 2-pointers, 1-for-2 from 3-point land, and 2-of-2 free throw shooting.

=== Sophomore season ===
Heading into his sophomore year, Williams was expected to shoulder a much larger role for Missouri with the losses of guards Jabari Brown, Jordan Clarkson, and Earnest Ross, who combined to average more than 50 points per game, as well as head coach Frank Haith. Williams was Missouri's top returning scorer, rebounder, and shot-blocker. However, tough times were ahead for Williams as he suffered a partial meniscus tear in his right knee during the preseason of early October 2014.

Despite leading Missouri in scoring (11.9 points), rebounding (7.1 rebounds), and shot-blocking (0.6) per game during his sophomore season, Williams was hampered all season by a torn meniscus, and the Tigers finished with the most losses and longest losing streak (13) in school history with a 9–23 record.

In the regular season opener in a 69–61 loss to UMKC on November 14, 2014, Williams had a season high of 4 blocks, along with 6 points and 5 rebounds on 3-of-7 field goals. On December 2, he dropped 18 points, 11 rebounds, 1 assist, and 1 block on 5-for-9 field goals and 8-for-14 free throws in a win over Southeast Missouri State. In an overtime loss to Oklahoma State on December 30, Williams scored 22 points, along with 9 rebounds, 1 assist, and 1 steal on 6-of-10 2-point field goals, 2-of-3 3-pointers, and 4-of-7 free throws. On January 8, 2015, he had double-double (21 points and 10 rebounds) and 1 block on 8-for-17 field goal shooting and 5-for-8 free throws in a 74–67 win in overtime over LSU in the SEC opener. Williams had career-highs of 27 points and 3-of-5 from beyond the 3-point arc, along with 7 rebounds, 2 assists, and 1 block, on 6-for-10 2-pointers and 6-for-8 from the free throw line in a 77–74 loss against Mississippi State on February 14. He scored 23 of his points in the second half, including a 3-pointer which brought Mizzou within 1 with 2 seconds remaining, but it wasn't enough.

=== Junior season ===
"Johnathan is a very high character young man, and really good academically,” head coach Mark Few said. “He’s a proven commodity at high Division I level in scoring and rebounding, and he fits a real need for where our team and personnel makeup will be a year from now. I think this next year of development will be huge for him. It’s a perfect scenario with being able to work with Nigel [Williams-Goss] and also, day-in and day-out, go against Kyle [Wiltjer], Domantas [Sabonis] and Przemek [Karnowski]. That really creates a great situation for him development-wise."

— Mark Few, Gonzaga Head Coach.

After his 2014–15 campaign with Missouri, Williams decided to transfer. His father cited that Williams didn't fit in with his teammates and didn't believe he was developing enough. His father thought the a redshirt year to "get stronger, work on ball skills and get that knee a chance to heal." Missouri restricted Williams from transferring to 25 schools, including every SEC and Big-12 school, along with Arizona and Illinois. Williams took official visits to Gonzaga, Georgetown, and SMU, but made the decision to transfer to Gonzaga. Williams would have to redshirt the 2015–16 season before having two years of eligibility to play at the beginning of the 2016–17 season.

=== Senior season ===
As a senior at Gonzaga, Williams led the team in scoring (13.4 points per game) and rebounding (8.5 per game). He was an All-West Coast Conference selection and was AP All-America honorable mention.

== Professional career ==
=== Los Angeles Lakers (2018–2019) ===
After going undrafted in the 2018 NBA draft, Williams signed a contract offer from the Los Angeles Lakers to be on their Summer League team roster. On July 21, 2018, Williams signed with the Lakers. He was waived on October 13, 2018. Williams then signed a two-way contract with the Lakers on October 19, 2018. On March 9, 2019, Williams scored his career-high 18 points with ten rebounds, an assist and a block in a 120–107 loss to the Boston Celtics. Williams averaged 6.5 points and 4.1 rebounds per game for the Lakers and 15.2 points and 8.7 rebounds per game in the G League.

On June 30, 2019, Williams joined the Houston Rockets for the 2019 NBA Summer League. He averaged 8.4 points and 6.0 rebounds per game in five games.

=== Maccabi Rishon LeZion (2019) ===
On July 30, 2019, Williams signed with Maccabi Rishon LeZion of the Israel Premier League. On November 13, 2019, Williams recorded a double-double of 11 rebounds and a career-high 19 points, while shooting 7-of-11 from the field, in a 79–85 loss to Virtus Bologna. In 18 games played for Rishon LeZion, he averaged 11.7 points and 9.1 rebounds per game. On December 23, 2019, he parted ways with Rishon LeZion after receiving offers from NBA teams.

=== Washington Wizards (2019–2020) ===
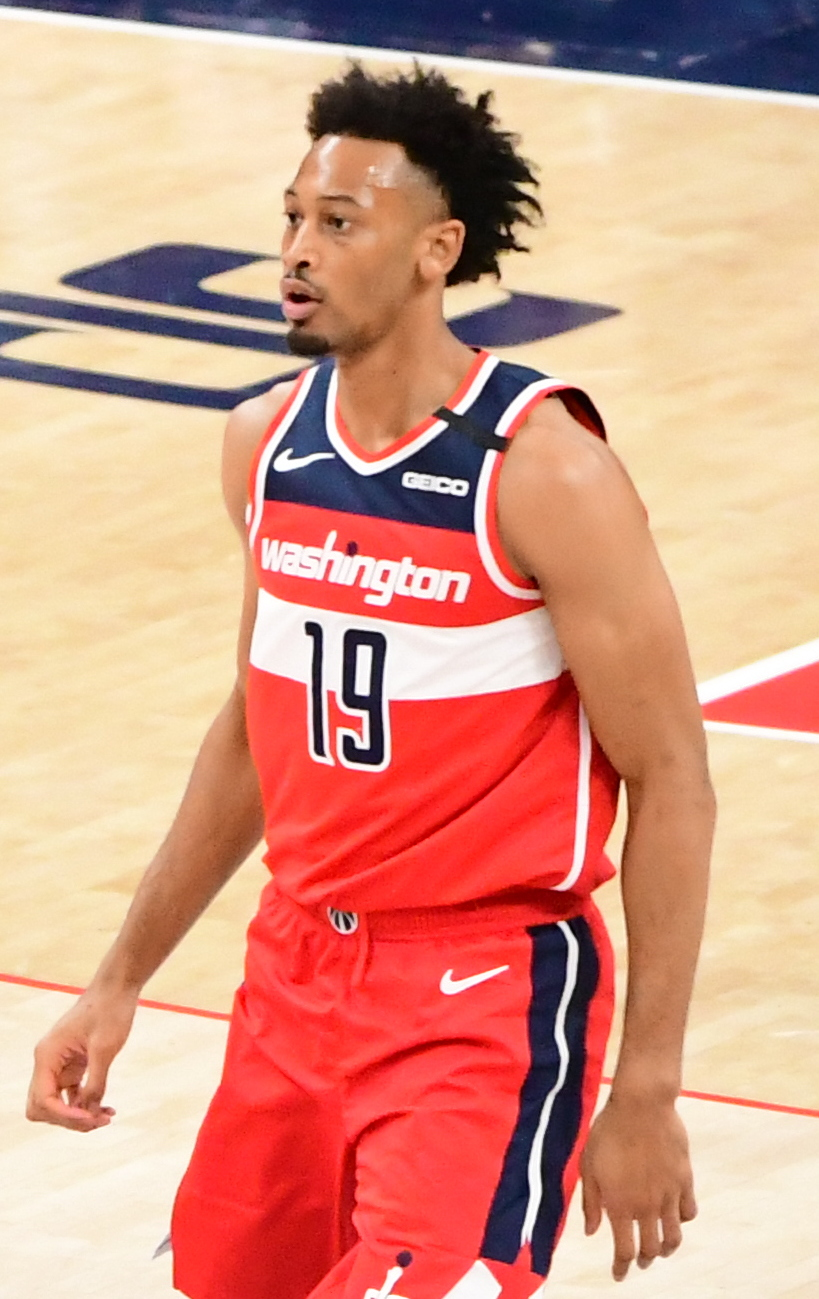
Williams with the Washington Wizards in 2020

On December 26, 2019, Williams signed with the Washington Wizards. On January 4, 2020, Williams was waived by the Wizards after appearing in 6 games for the team. Eight days later on January 12, 2020, the Washington Wizards announced that they had signed Williams to a two-way contract. In the G League, Williams averaged 13.1 points, 9.6 rebounds, 1.4 assists and 1.1 blocks per game.

=== Galatasaray (2020–2021) ===
On September 6, 2020, Williams signed with Galatasaray of the Turkish Basketball Super League (BSL).

=== Niners Chemnitz (2021) ===
On February 24, 2021, he signed with Niners Chemnitz of the German Basketball Bundesliga (BBL).

=== Aquila Basket Trento (2021–2022) ===
On August 21, 2021, Williams signed with Dolomiti Energia Trento of the Lega Basket Serie A.

=== Fighting Eagles Nagoya (2022–2023) ===
On July 1, 2022, Williams signed with Fighting Eagles Nagoya of the B.League.

=== Phoenix Super LPG Fuel Masters (2023–2024) ===
In October 2023, Williams signed with the Phoenix Super LPG Fuel Masters of the Philippine Basketball Association (PBA) as the team's import for the 2023–24 PBA Commissioner's Cup.

=== Toyama Grouses (2024) ===
On March 19, 2024, Williams signed with Toyama Grouses of the B.League.

=== Veltex Shizuoka (2024) ===
On November 1, 2024, Williams signed a short-term contract with Veltex Shizuoka of the B.League. On December 4, his contract was ended.

=== Chiba Jets (2024–2025) ===
On December 6, 2024, Williams signed with Chiba Jets of the B.League. On January 31, 2025, his contract was terminated.

=== London Lions (2025–2026) ===
On August 2, 2025, Williams signed a year long contract with London Lions of the SLB and the EuroCup.

=== Phoenix Super LPG Fuel Masters (2026) ===
On April 30, 2026, Williams returns to Phoenix for his 2nd stint with the team.

=== Cholet Basket (2026–present) ===
On October 17, 2026, he signed with Cholet Basket of the French LNB Élite.

== National team career ==
Johnathan Williams helped the USA win a gold medal in the 2011 FIBA Americas U16 Championship, while averaging 5.4 points and 4.6 rebounds. In 2012, Williams joined the US and won a gold medal in the FIBA U17 World Championship, while averaging 7 points and 4.6 rebounds in 16 minutes per game.

== Career statistics ==
Legend
GP	Games played	GS	Games started	MPG	Minutes per game
FG%	Field goal percentage	3P%	3-point field goal percentage	FT%	Free throw percentage
RPG	Rebounds per game	APG	Assists per game	SPG	Steals per game
BPG	Blocks per game	PPG	Points per game	**Bold**	Career high

=== NBA ===
==== Regular season ====
Year	Team	GP	GS	MPG	FG%	3P%	FT%	RPG	APG	SPG	BPG	PPG
2018–19	L.A. Lakers	**24**	0	15.5	.591	.000	.563	4.1	.5	**.3**	.3	**6.5**
2019–20	Washington	6	**5**	**20.5**	**.682**	.000	**.600**	**6.3**	**1.0**	.2	**.4**	5.5
Career		30	5	16.5	.606	.000	.566	4.6	.6	.3	.3	6.3

=== G League ===
==== Regular season ====
Year	Team	GP	GS	MPG	FG%	3P%	FT%	RPG	APG	SPG	BPG	PPG
2018–19	South Bay	**36**	**31**	**27.3**	.546	.250	.433	8.7	1.7	.7	.9	**15.2**
2019–20	Capital City	16	16	25.5	**.679**	.000	**.462**	**9.4**	**1.8**	.5	**1.0**	13.1
Career		51	47	26.7	.575	.212	.445	9.0	1.6	.7	.9	14.9

=== College ===
Year	Team	GP	GS	MPG	FG%	3P%	FT%	RPG	APG	SPG	BPG	PPG
2013–14	Missouri	35	35	26.3	.457	.364	.565	6.5	.7	.4	**1.6**	5.8
2014–15	Missouri	32	32	**29.4**	.412	.344	**.617**	7.1	.8	.3	.6	11.9
2016–17	Gonzaga	**39**	**39**	24.3	**.592**	**.400**	.563	6.4	.8	**.7**	.9	10.2
2017–18	Gonzaga	34	33	29.2	.565	.242	.561	**8.3**	**1.6**	.7	1.2	**13.5**
Career		140	139	27.3	.507	.338	.577	7.1	1.0	.5	1.1	10.4

Source: RealGM

== Personal life ==
Williams is the son of Johnny Williams and Barbara Williams.
