= Arthur Johnson (basketball) =

American basketball player

Personal information
- Born: December 20, 1981 (age 44) Detroit, Michigan, U.S.
- Listed height: 6 ft 10 in (2.08 m)

Career information
- High school: Pershing (Detroit, Michigan)
- College: University of Missouri
- NBA draft: 2004: undrafted
- Position: Center

Arthur Dock Johnson (born December 20, 1982) is an American basketball player playing most recently for Istanbul BBSK.

== Biography ==
Johnson was born in Detroit, Michigan. After graduating from Pershing High School, he played four seasons for the Missouri Tigers at the University of Missouri. During his collegiate years, he played on the All-Big 12 second team during the 2002–2003 and 2003–2004 seasons and on the All-Big 12 tournament first team in 2003.

He remained undrafted in the 2004 NBA draft. Despite this, he played in the NBA Summer League for the Phoenix Suns (2004–2005), the Atlanta Hawks (2005–2006), and the Chicago Bulls (2005–2006).

In October 2004, Johnson signed with the Denver Nuggets, but was placed on waivers and became a free agent in January 2005. In October 2005, he signed with the New Jersey Nets, but within the month was on waivers and became a free agent.

He has played internationally with Aris B.C. (2004–2005), Cherkasy Monkeys (2005–2006, 2006–2007), Caserta (2007–2008), Vestel (2010–2011), Maliye Milli (2011–2012), and Istanbul BBSK (2012–2013).
