= Anthony Robinson II =

American basketball player (born 2005)

No. 2 – Florida State Seminoles
- Position: Point guard
- Conference: Atlantic Coast Conference

Personal information
- Born: January 5, 2005 (age 21)
- Listed height: 6 ft 3 in (1.91 m)
- Listed weight: 185 lb (84 kg)

Career information
- High school: Florida State University School (Tallahassee, Florida)
- College: Missouri (2023–2026); Florida State (2026–present)

Career highlights
- SEC All-Defensive team (2025)

Anthony Robinson II (born January 25, 2005) is an American college basketball player for the Florida State Seminoles of the Atlantic Coast Conference (ACC). He previously played for the Missouri Tigers.

== Early life and high school ==
As a senior at Florida State University School, Robinson II averaged 18.8 points, 6.6 rebounds and 4.1 assists per game. He was rated as a three-star recruit and committed to play college basketball for the Missouri Tigers over other schools such as Auburn, Florida State and Virginia Tech.

== College career ==
On November 22, 2023, Robinson II posted ten points, three rebounds, two assists, two steals and a block in a win over South Carolina State. During his freshman season in 2023-24, he averaged 3.9 points per game on 36 percent shooting. On November 24, 2024, Robinson II recorded his first career double-double, totaling 11 points, 11 rebounds, and seven assists in a win over Arkansas–Pine Bluff. On February 15, 2025, he tallied 15 points, seven assists, five rebounds and four steals in a win over Georgia. For his performance during the 2024-25 season, Robinson II earned Southeastern Conference (SEC) all-defensive honors.
