= Byron Irvin =

American basketball player (born 1966)

Personal information
- Born: December 2, 1966 (age 59) La Grange, Illinois, U.S.
- Listed height: 6 ft 5 in (1.96 m)
- Listed weight: 190 lb (86 kg)

Career information
- High school: Julian (Chicago, Illinois)
- College: Arkansas (1984–1986); Missouri (1987–1989)
- NBA draft: 1989: 1st round, 22nd overall pick
- Drafted by: Portland Trail Blazers
- Position: Shooting guard
- Number: 23, 32

Career history
- List may be incomplete
- 1989–1990: Portland Trail Blazers
- 1990–1991: Washington Bullets
- 1991: La Crosse Catbirds
- 1991–1993: Columbus Horizon
- 1993: Fort Wayne Fury
- 1993: Washington Bullets
- 1993: Hapoel Givatayim
- 1994: Purefoods
- 1994: Fort Wayne Fury
- 1994–1995: Mexico Aztecas
- Stats at NBA.com
- Stats at Basketball Reference

Byron Edward Irvin (born December 2, 1966) is an American former professional basketball player. A 6-foot-5-inch (1.96 m), 190-pound (86 kg) shooting guard, he was selected by the Portland Trail Blazers in the first round (22nd pick overall) of the 1989 NBA draft. He played college basketball for the Arkansas Razorbacks and Missouri Tigers.

== High school ==
Irvin attended Chicago's Percy Julian High School. In his senior year of high school he averaged 32 points a game, and in one game he scored 50 points.

== College career ==
He played collegiately at the University of Arkansas under legendary coach Eddie Sutton before Sutton left for Kentucky. Irvin was there from 1984/85-1985/86, then transferred to the University of Missouri Played for Hall of Fame Coach Norm Stewart (1987/88-1988/89, after having missed the 1986/87 season). He also received his bachelor's degree from the University of Missouri.

== Professional career ==
Irvin played in NBA for three seasons: 1989–90 for the Portland Trail Blazers and 1990–91 and 1992–93 for the Washington Bullets, averaging 5.2 PPG in his career. He also played in the Continental Basketball Association and overseas in Spain, Greece, Israel, Argentina, Switzerland, Philippines, Belgium, Dominican Republic, and Venezuela.

== After playing career ==
Irvin is now a sports agent. He is Senior Vice President of Basketball Relativity Sports, and has represented NBA players such as Shawn Marion, Jason Terry, Al Harrington, Stephen Jackson, Gilbert Arenas, Joey Graham, Stephen Graham, Reggie Evans, Kris Humphries, Jason Richardson, Melvin Ely, Justin Williams, Isaiah Thomas, Nene Hilario, Erick Dampier, Darington Hobson. Rodney White, Rafer Skip Alston, Matt Carroll, Troy Murphy, Gerald Green, Antoine Walker, Randy Holcomb, Jrue Holiday, Rodney White, Moochie Norris, Ricky Davis, Ndudi Ebi, Earl Clark. He has negotiated over $800 million in contracts.

== Personal life ==
Irvin is a cousin of former NBA player and head coach Doc Rivers.
