= Anthony Peeler =

American basketball player (born 1969)

Personal information
- Born: November 25, 1969 (age 56) Kansas City, Missouri, U.S.
- Listed height: 6 ft 4 in (1.93 m)
- Listed weight: 208 lb (94 kg)

Career information
- High school: Paseo Academy (Kansas City, Missouri)
- College: Missouri (1988–1992)
- NBA draft: 1992: 1st round, 15th overall pick
- Drafted by: Los Angeles Lakers
- Playing career: 1992–2005
- Position: Shooting guard
- Number: 1, 7, 44, 8

Career history
- 1992–1996: Los Angeles Lakers
- 1996–1998: Vancouver Grizzlies
- 1998–2003: Minnesota Timberwolves
- 2003–2004: Sacramento Kings
- 2004–2005: Washington Wizards

Career highlights
- Consensus second-team All-American (1992); Third-team All-American – UPI (1990); Big Eight Player of the Year (1992); 2× First-team All-Big Eight (1990, 1992); McDonald's All-American (1988); Second-team Parade All-American (1988); Mr. Show-Me Basketball (1988)

Career NBA statistics
- Points: 8,017 (9.7 ppg)
- Rebounds: 2,136 (2.6 rpg)
- Assists: 1,955 (2.4 apg)
- Stats at NBA.com
- Stats at Basketball Reference

Anthony Eugene Peeler (born November 25, 1969) is an American former professional basketball player, having played for a number of National Basketball Association (NBA) teams from 1992 to 2005. He was most commonly known for his defense and athleticism. He later became an assistant coach at NCAA Division II Virginia Union University.

== High school and college ==
Peeler was a standout high school player at Paseo High School in Kansas City, Missouri where he earned the title of Mr. Show-Me Basketball (the name for the state's Mr. Basketball, as Missouri is called the "Show Me State") and was named to the McDonald's All-American team his senior year, joining a class that included such names as Alonzo Mourning, Billy Owens, Shawn Kemp, and Malik Sealy to name a few. He took part in the 1988 McDonald's All-American Game, and also participated in the 1988 Dapper Dan Classic where he was named MVP of the West team. He reportedly planned to sign with the defending national champs Kansas, but changed his mind because he wasn't sure if Kansas coach Larry Brown would be leaving to coach elsewhere (Brown indeed left Kansas to coach the NBA's San Antonio Spurs), and because he, in his words, "didn't want to be a one-man team." Peeler chose the University of Missouri and went on to be one of the school's all-time greats.

Anthony Peeler averaged 16.8 points per game for his Tiger career and left as Missouri's third all-time leading scorer with 1,970 points, and the all-time leader in assists (497) and steals (196). During his career, he was named Big Eight Newcomer Of The Year after his freshman season where he averaged 10 points and nearly 3 assists per game, first-team All-Big Eight, and in 1992 (his senior year) he was named the conference AP Player of the Year and Male Athlete of the Year and a consensus second-team All-American after averaging 23.4 points, 5.5 rebounds and 3.9 assists per game, and scored a career-high 43 points in a losing cause against arch-rival Kansas. Missouri finished 21–9 that season and reached the second round of the NCAA tournament, where they lost to Seton Hall.

In 2006, Peeler was named to the Missouri's 30-member All-Century team, in honor of the school's 100th year of competition.

== Professional career ==
After his college eligibility was up, Peeler was drafted 15th overall by the Los Angeles Lakers in the 1992 NBA draft. Peeler was one of the top shooting guards available and was considered a possible NBA draft lottery pick by some analysts, but his stock began to plummet due to off-the-court legal issues. Peeler was placed on five years of probation stemming from an altercation with a woman he once dated at Missouri; and was accused, mere days before the draft, of being involved in another altercation, this time with an ex-girlfriend he knew from high school. But the Lakers felt that drafting Peeler would be worth the risk if he could help revitalize their backcourt, which was still reeling from Magic Johnson's abrupt retirement and only had unproven 2nd year player Tony Smith & aging veterans Sedale Threatt and Byron Scott as the legitimate remaining threats at the guard spots.

In his rookie year, Peeler appeared in 77 games, starting 11 of them, and became the first Lakers rookie to average double figures (10.4 ppg) since Byron Scott in 1983–84. He scored a season-high 25 points against the Indiana Pacers on January 28, 1993. Peeler also broke Scott's Lakers rookie record for 3-point shooting.

Peeler also played for the Vancouver Grizzlies, Minnesota Timberwolves, Sacramento Kings and the Washington Wizards averaging 9.7 points per game throughout his NBA career.

While with Sacramento during the 2003–04 NBA season, he led the league in three-point field goal accuracy with 48.2 percent. During that season's playoffs, during game 6 matchup between Sacramento and Minnesota, Peeler threw an elbow at former Timberwolves teammate Kevin Garnett, followed by a left hook; Peeler was suspended for 2 games, which included a game 7 loss, which ended the Kings' season, and the season-opener of the Washington Wizards' 2004–05 campaign, with whom Peeler spent his final year.

== After the NBA ==
Following retirement from playing, Peeler returned to college and finished his degree at Virginia Union University in Richmond, Virginia. He entered the coaching profession in China by serving as an assistant coach. He had expressed interest in joining the coaching staff of Frank Haith at Missouri in 2011, but no job offer was forthcoming. He is currently awaiting other opportunities.
