= Bill Stauffer =

American basketball player

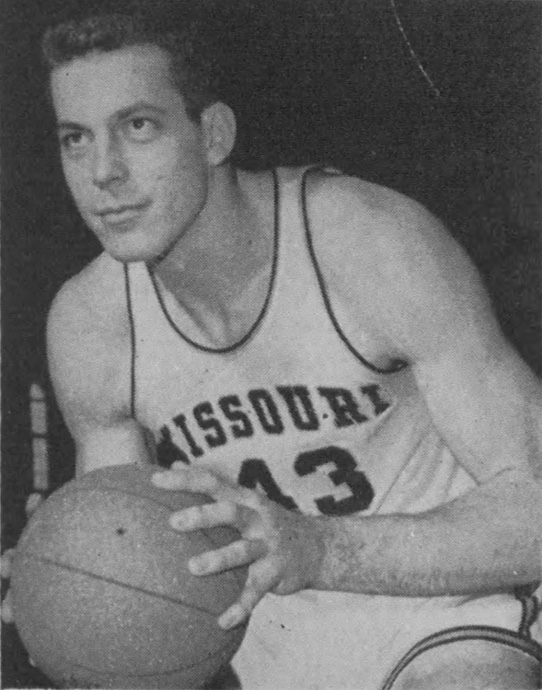
- Stauffer during his senior year at Missouri

Personal information
- Born: June 9, 1930 Maryville, Missouri, U.S.
- Died: November 26, 2015 (aged 85) Urbandale, Iowa, U.S.
- Listed height: 6 ft 4 in (1.93 m)
- Listed weight: 210 lb (95 kg)

Career information
- High school: Maryville (Maryville, Missouri)
- College: Missouri (1949–1952)
- NBA draft: 1952: 1st round, 6th overall pick
- Drafted by: Boston Celtics
- Position: Center / power forward

Career highlights
- 2× First-team All-Big Seven (1951, 1952); No. 43 retired by Missouri Tigers
- Stats at Basketball Reference

William Albert Stauffer (June 9, 1930 – November 26, 2015) was an American basketball player. He was an all-conference college player at the University of Missouri and a first-round NBA draft pick by the Boston Celtics in 1952.

Stauffer came to Missouri from Maryville High School in Maryville, Missouri. His father Marion Stauffer was publisher of the Stauffer Communications newspaper Maryville Daily Forum.

Undersized for the center position at 6'4", he nonetheless was one of the Big Seven Conference's top rebounders and left Missouri as the school's all-time leader. He was named first-team All-Big Seven in both his junior and senior seasons. Stauffer's jersey was the first retired by the Missouri basketball program and in 1991 he was elected to the school's athletic Hall of Fame. In 2006, he was named to the school's All-Century team.

Following the close of his college career, Stauffer was selected by the Boston Celtics in the first round of the 1952 NBA draft. However, he chose to instead enlist in the United States Air Force where he played basketball for the Andrews Air Force Base team that won the Air Force worldwide championship in 1954.

After leaving the Air Force in 1954 he worked at the Louisiana Press-Journal in Louisiana, Missouri, and then from 1955 to 1963 at Stauffer newspapers York News-Times and Grand Island Independent in Nebraska. He then worked at Blue Cross-Blue Shield, Iowa, before retiring in 1992.

He died at 85 on November 26, 2015, from a brain hemorrhage.
