= Willie Smith (basketball) =

American professional basketball player

Personal information
- Born: October 26, 1953 (age 73) Las Vegas, Nevada, U.S.
- Listed height: 6 ft 2 in (1.88 m)
- Listed weight: 170 lb (77 kg)

Career information
- High school: Ed W. Clark (Las Vegas, Nevada)
- College: Seminole State (1972–1974); Missouri (1974–1976)
- NBA draft: 1976: 2nd round, 18th overall pick
- Drafted by: Chicago Bulls
- Playing career: 1976–1984
- Position: Point guard
- Number: 11, 8

Career history
- 1976: Chicago Bulls
- 1977: Indiana Pacers
- 1978: Kentucky Stallions
- 1978–1979: Las Vegas Dealers
- 1978–1979: Portland Trail Blazers
- 1979: Jersey Shore Bullets
- 1979–1980: Cleveland Cavaliers
- 1980–1981: Montana Golden Nuggets
- 1982–1983: Rochester Zeniths
- 1983–1984: Sarasota Stingers

Career highlights
- CBA Most Valuable Player (1981); All-CBA First Team (1981); CBA steals leader (1983); Second-team All-American – USBWA (1976); Third-team All-American – NABC (1976); Big Eight Player of the Year (1976); 2× First-team All-Big Eight (1975, 1976); No. 30 retired by Missouri Tigers
- Stats at NBA.com
- Stats at Basketball Reference

William C. Smith (born October 26, 1953) is a retired American professional basketball player. He was a 6-foot-2-inch (1.88 m), 170-pound (77 kg) point guard and played collegiately at Seminole Junior College and the University of Missouri, where he earned All-America honors. Smith, nicknamed "Mister Magic", averaged 25.3 points per game during the 1976 season as he led Mizzou to a Big Eight Conference basketball championship.

== Professional career ==
Smith played in the NBA from 1976 to 1980 after being selected with the 1st pick in the second round of the 1976 NBA draft by the Chicago Bulls. In his four-season NBA career, Smith played with the Bulls, Indiana Pacers, Portland Trail Blazers and Cleveland Cavaliers, averaging 4.6 points, 1.7 rebounds and 3.6 assists per game.

Smith played in the Continental Basketball Association (CBA) for the Montana Golden Nuggets during the 1980–81 season, Rochester Zeniths during the 1982–83 season and Sarasota Stingers during the 1983–84 season. He was selected as the CBA Most Valuable Player and named to the All-CBA First Team in 1981.

== Post-NBA ==
Since his time in the NBA, Smith has been involved with multiple business ventures and currently resides in Columbia, Missouri. On November 1, 2012, it was announced that Smith would be inducted into the Missouri Sports Hall of Fame on November 15.

== Career statistics ==
Legend
GP	Games played	GS	Games started	MPG	Minutes per game
FG%	Field goal percentage	3P%	3-point field goal percentage	FT%	Free throw percentage
RPG	Rebounds per game	APG	Assists per game	SPG	Steals per game
BPG	Blocks per game	PPG	Points per game	**Bold**	Career high

=== NBA ===
==== Regular season ====
Year	Team	GP	GS	MPG	FG%	3P%	FT%	RPG	APG	SPG	BPG	PPG
1976–77	Chicago	2		5.5	.000		–	.0	.0	.0	.0	.0
1977–78	Indiana	1	0	7.0	–		–	.0	1.0	.0	.0	.0
1978–79	Portland	13		10.1	**.523**		.706	1.0	1.3	.8	**.1**	4.5
1979–80	Cleveland	**62**		**17.0**	.384	.239	**.769**	**2.0**	**4.2**	**1.2**	.0	**4.8**
Career		78	0	15.4	.400	.239	.754	1.7	3.6	1.1	.0	4.6
