= Al Eberhard =

American basketball player (born 1952)

Personal information
- Born: May 10, 1952 (age 74) Cedar Rapids, Iowa, U.S.
- Listed height: 6 ft 6 in (1.98 m)
- Listed weight: 225 lb (102 kg)

Career information
- High school: Springville (Springville, Iowa)
- College: Missouri (1971–1974)
- NBA draft: 1974: 1st round, 15th overall pick
- Drafted by: Detroit Pistons
- Playing career: 1974–1978
- Position: Small forward
- Number: 44

Career history
- 1974–1978: Detroit Pistons

Career highlights
- 2× First-team All-Big Eight (1973, 1974)
- Stats at NBA.com
- Stats at Basketball Reference

Allen Dean Eberhard (born May 10, 1952) is an American former professional basketball player who played four seasons in the National Basketball Association (NBA).

== Amateur career ==
Out of rural Springville, Iowa, and Springville High School, Eberhard was third team All-State in his senior year, graduating in 1970. His high school coach had contacts with Norm Stewart, coach of the Missouri Tigers, who had previously led the Northern Iowa program, and Eberhard would sign with the Tigers. Sitting out his freshman season as required by NCAA rules at the time, the adjustment from a high school class of 41 students to the Missouri campus was a challenge. Eberhard said, "I remember the first day I walked on campus with 22,000 students and I wasn't sure what I was doing. I wondered if I made the right decision. That's why it was so important growing up on the farm. My family's mental toughness and work ethic taught me valuable lessons. I did a lot of growing up that first year away from home. I learned a lot about life. Our freshman year was good for all of us."

Eberhard thrived at Missouri, scoring 1,347 points in his career, averaging 19.7 ppg and 12.0 rpg in his senior season (1973–74) and a double-double for his Tigers career with 16.8 ppg and 10.1 rpg, helping the team to back-to-back 20 win seasons in 1971–72 and 1972–73 and as high as a #5 national ranking. Eberhard was twice name as the MVP at the Big Eight Holiday Tournament and earned All Big Eight honors his junior and senior years.

== Professional career ==
Eberhard was drafted with the 15th pick in the first round of the 1974 NBA draft by the Detroit Pistons. Eberhard became a key bench contributor for Detroit, averaging a career high 9.3 ppg, 4.8 rpg in 25.1 mpg over 81 games in the 1975-76 Detroit Pistons season, helping Detroit to its first playoff series win since 1962. Eberhard was plagued by injuries in his NBA career, including a broken ankle that required surgery in the 1978-79 pre-season, forcing his release from Detroit and the end of his playing career. In total, Eberhard played four seasons in the National Basketball Association (NBA) for the Pistons, averaging 6.8 ppg and 3.5 rpg in 220 career games.

== Personal life ==
Eberhard has coached basketball at Tulsa and for his alma mater Missouri. He would settle in Columbia where he worked for the university in the MU athletic department for the Tiger Scholarship Fund, in the campus development office, and served on board of the university's Thompson Center Foundation for Autism. He also served as the executive director for the Governor's Council for Fitness and Health in Missouri.

He was inducted into the Iowa High School Basketball Hall of Fame, the Missouri Sports Hall of Fame and in 2003 the university's athletic Hall of Fame. Eberhard was named to the Missouri All-Century Team in 2006.

Eberhard is the uncle of former Indiana Hoosiers and former Portland Trail Blazers basketball player Cody Zeller, former North Carolina Tar Heels player Tyler Zeller, and former Notre Dame Fighting Irish and former Phoenix Suns player Luke Zeller.

== Career statistics ==
Legend
GP	Games played	GS	Games started	MPG	Minutes per game
FG%	Field goal percentage	3P%	3-point field goal percentage	FT%	Free throw percentage
RPG	Rebounds per game	APG	Assists per game	SPG	Steals per game
BPG	Blocks per game	PPG	Points per game	**Bold**	Career high

=== NBA ===
==== Regular season ====
Year	Team	GP	MPG	FG%	FT%	RPG	APG	SPG	BPG	PPG
1974–75	Detroit	34	8.1	.365	.810	1.4	.5	.4	.0	2.3
1975–76	Detroit	**81**	**25.5**	.414	**.834**	**4.8**	**1.0**	**1.1**	**.2**	**9.3**
1976–77	Detroit	68	17.9	**.476**	.790	3.3	.7	.7	**.2**	6.9
1977–78	Detroit	37	15.6	.444	.672	2.8	.7	.4	.1	4.9
Career		220	18.8	.433	.797	3.5	.8	.7	.2	6.8

==== Playoffs ====
Year	Team	GP	MPG	FG%	FT%	RPG	APG	SPG	BPG	PPG
1976	Detroit	**8**	**22.8**	**.436**	**.737**	**3.3**	**.9**	**1.0**	**.5**	**6.0**
1977	Detroit	3	14.0	.111	.625	3.0	.7	.3	.0	2.3
Career		11	20.4	.375	.704	3.2	.8	.8	.4	5.0
