= Kim English (basketball) =

American basketball player and coach (born 1988)

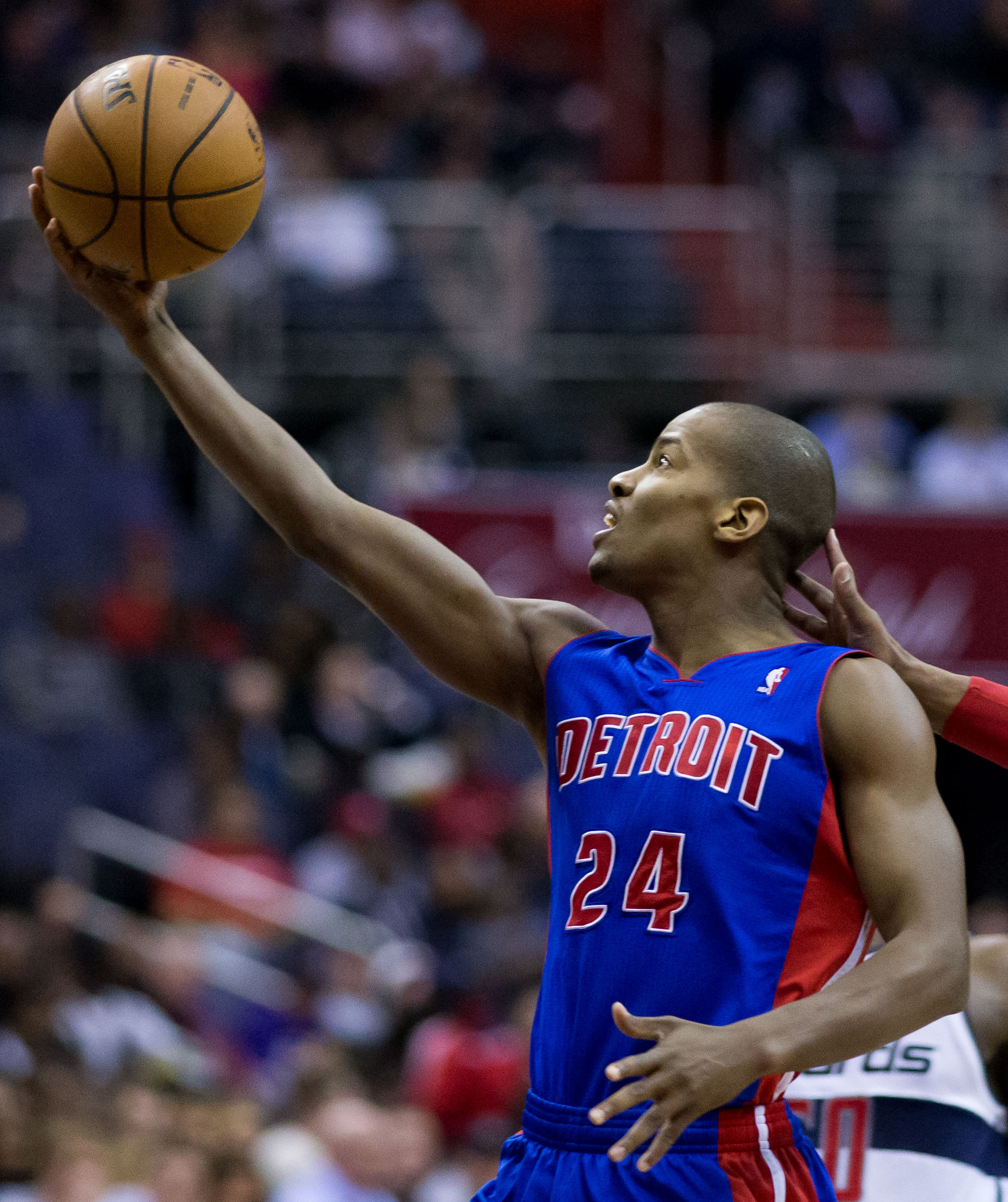
- English with the Detroit Pistons in 2013

Personal information
- Born: September 24, 1988 (age 38) Baltimore, Maryland, U.S.
- Listed height: 6 ft 5 in (1.96 m)
- Listed weight: 200 lb (91 kg)

Career information
- High school: Randallstown (Randallstown, Maryland); Towson Catholic (Towson, Maryland); Calvert Hall (Towson, Maryland); Notre Dame Prep (Fitchburg, Massachusetts)
- College: Missouri (2008–2012)
- NBA draft: 2012: 2nd round, 44th overall pick
- Drafted by: Detroit Pistons
- Playing career: 2012–2015
- Position: Shooting guard
- Number: 24
- Coaching career: 2015–present

Career history

Playing
- 2012–2013: Detroit Pistons
- 2012: →Fort Wayne Mad Ants
- 2013: Montepaschi Siena
- 2013–2014: Chorale Roanne
- 2014: SLUC Nancy Basket
- 2014–2015: Cholet Basket
- 2015: Guaros de Lara

Coaching
- 2015–2017: Tulsa (assistant)
- 2017–2019: Colorado (assistant)
- 2019–2021: Tennessee (assistant)
- 2021–2023: George Mason
- 2023–2026: Providence

Career highlights
- 2× Third-team All-Big 12 (2010, 2012); Big 12 tournament MOP (2012)
- Stats at NBA.com
- Stats at Basketball Reference

Kim David English Jr. (born September 24, 1988) is an American men's college basketball coach and former player. He was previously head coach of the Providence Friars and George Mason Patriots. English played for the Missouri Tigers before a three-year professional career.

== Early life ==
English was born on September 24, 1988, in Baltimore, Maryland. His mother, Brenda Fowlkes, and his father, Kim English Sr. raised English along with his two sisters Bria and Jessica and brother Kalil.

During his senior season at Randallstown High School, English averaged 18.2 points and 7.4 rebounds and was named MVP while leading Randallstown to their third consecutive state championship.

After high school, English attended Notre Dame Preparatory School in Fitchburg, Massachusetts. English averaged 17.3 points, 6.2 rebounds, and 3.9 assists per game in 2007–08 while again earning team MVP honors.

College recruiting
Name	Hometown	School	Height	Weight	Commit date
Kim English; SG	Baltimore, MD	Randallstown High School (MD)	6 ft 5 in (1.96 m)	180 lb (82 kg)	Sep 30, 2007
Kim English; SG	Recruit ratings: Scout: Rivals:				

== College career ==
English committed to attend the University of Missouri on September 30, 2007.

As a freshman, English worked his way into the starting lineup, starting 13 out of 16 Big 12 games. In the second round of the 2009 NCAA tournament, with Missouri tied 79–79 with Marquette, English came off the bench to replace an injured J. T. Tiller and hit two free throws to give Missouri an 81–79 lead en route to an 83–79 victory.

English averaged 14 points per game as a sophomore while earning USBWA All-District honors, being named to Dick Vitale's All-Improved Team, and earning Third Team All-Big 12 honors, becoming just the third Mizzou underclassmen to earn All-Big 12 honors.

As a junior English was unable to improve upon his sophomore year campaign, averaging just 10 points per game.

As a senior, English averaged 14.5 points per game and made 45.9% of his three-pointers, earning Third Team All-Big 12 honors for the second time. Leading Mizzou to the 2012 Big 12 men's basketball tournament championship, Mizzou's second Big 12 tournament championship in four years, English was named the Big 12 tournament Most Outstanding Player after averaging 23 points and shooting 78 percent from the field.

With 107 victories in four years, English, with teammates Marcus Denmon and Steve Moore won more games than any senior class in Mizzou basketball history.

== Professional career ==
=== 2012–13 season ===
English was selected by the Detroit Pistons with the 44th overall pick in the 2012 NBA draft. On July 9, 2012, he joined the Pistons for the 2012 NBA Summer League. On July 12, 2012, he signed with the Pistons. He was assigned to the D-League's Fort Wayne Mad Ants on December 12, 2012, and was recalled a week later.

=== 2013–14 season ===
On July 7, 2013, English joined the Pistons for the 2013 NBA Summer League. On July 11, 2013, he was waived by the Pistons.

On August 26, 2013, English signed with Montepaschi Siena of Italy. In mid-November 2013, he parted ways with Siena after just 9 games. On November 27, 2013, he signed with Chorale Roanne of France for the rest of the season.

=== 2014–15 season ===
In July 2014, English joined the Orlando Magic for the 2014 NBA Summer League. On September 26, 2014, he signed with the Chicago Bulls. However, he was later waived by the Bulls on October 18, 2014. Nine days later, he returned to France, signing a one-year deal with SLUC Nancy Basket. On December 1, 2014, he left Nancy and signed a one-month deal with French club Cholet Basket. On February 6, 2015, he signed with Venezuelan club Guaros de Lara. On April 26, 2015, he parted ways with Guaros de Lara.

== NBA career statistics ==
Legend
GP	Games played	GS	Games started	MPG	Minutes per game
FG%	Field goal percentage	3P%	3-point field goal percentage	FT%	Free throw percentage
RPG	Rebounds per game	APG	Assists per game	SPG	Steals per game
BPG	Blocks per game	PPG	Points per game	**Bold**	Career high

=== Regular season ===
Year	Team	GP	GS	MPG	FG%	3P%	FT%	RPG	APG	SPG	BPG	PPG
2012–13	Detroit	41	0	9.9	.375	.280	.724	.9	.6	.4	.1	2.9
Career		41	0	9.9	.375	.280	.724	.9	.6	.4	.1	2.9

== Coaching career ==
On May 17, 2015, English was hired by Frank Haith to become an assistant basketball coach for the University of Tulsa.

On August 11, 2017, English was hired by Tad Boyle as an assistant coach for Colorado, replacing Jean Prioleau, who became the new head coach at San Jose State. Two years later, on April 10, 2019, English was hired by Rick Barnes as an assistant for Tennessee. He replaced Rob Lanier on the staff, who was hired as the new head coach at Georgia State.

On March 23, 2021, English was hired as the head coach of George Mason.

On March 23, 2023, English was named the head coach of the Providence Friars. In his first season at Providence, he led the Friars to a 21–14 mark overall and a 10–10 record in Big East play. Devin Carter, who flourished in his first season under English, became the 44th Friar drafted all-time in the NBA when he was selected with the 13th pick in the 2024 Draft by the Sacramento Kings. In April 2024, English signed a six-year contract extension with the Friars. However, less than two years later, on March 13, 2026, Providence announced that English had been fired at the conclusion of a second consecutive losing season.

In April 2026, he was hired as an assistant coach at North Carolina under new head coach Michael Malone. Later that month, he informed UNC that he no longer wished to pursue the position.

== Head coaching record ==
Record table
Season	Team	Overall	Conference	Standing	Postseason
**George Mason Patriots** (Atlantic 10) (2021–2023)
2021–22	George Mason	14–16	7–9	9th	
2022–23	George Mason	20–13	11–7	5th	
George Mason:		34–29 (.540)	18–16 (.529)		
**Providence Friars** (Big East Conference) (2023–2026)
2023–24	Providence	21–14	10–10	T–6th	NIT First Round
2024–25	Providence	12–20	6–14	T–8th	
2025–26	Providence	15–18	7–13	T–7th	
Providence:		48–52 (.480)	23–37 (.383)		
Total:		82–81 (.503)			
National champion Postseason invitational champion Conference regular season champion Conference regular season and conference tournament champion Division regular season champion Division regular season and conference tournament champion Conference tournament champion
