= J. T. Tiller =

American basketball player (born 1988)

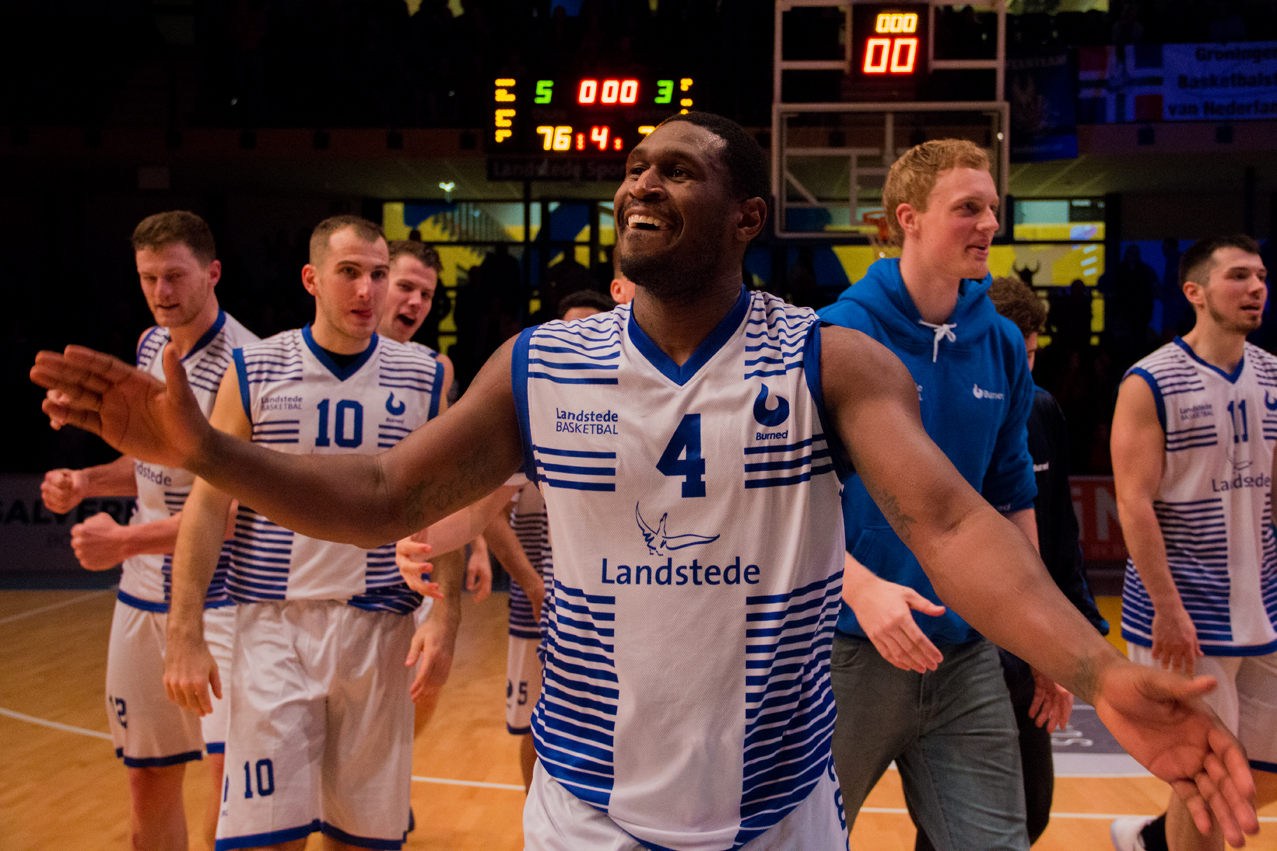
- Tiller with Landstede in 2016

Free agent
- Position: Point guard

Personal information
- Born: May 11, 1988 (age 38) Marietta, Georgia, U.S.
- Listed height: 6 ft 3 in (1.91 m)
- Listed weight: 200 lb (91 kg)

Career information
- High school: Joseph Wheeler (Marietta, Georgia)
- College: Missouri (2006–2010)
- NBA draft: 2010: undrafted
- Playing career: 2010–present

Career history
- 2010–2011: Idaho Stampede
- 2011–2013: Siarka Tarnobrzeg
- 2013–2015: Landstede Zwolle
- 2015–2016: Polpharma Starogard Gdański
- 2016–2017: Landstede Zwolle

Career highlights
- All-DBL Team (2017); DBL Defensive Player of the Year (2017); 2× DBL All-Defense Team (2015, 2017); Big 12 Defensive Player of the Year (2009); Big 12 All-Defensive team (2009)

J. T. Tiller (born May 11, 1988) is an American professional basketball player. He played collegiately with the University of Missouri Tigers.

== College career ==
Tiller won the 2009 Big 12 Defensive Player of the Year award after finishing his junior season at Mizzou with 8.4 points per game, as well as 4.0 assists and 2.1 steals. Tiller is known for his standout defense. In 2008–09, he was 9th in the nation in steals per minute, and in 2009-10 he finished 12th.

== Professional career ==
Tiller was drafted in the 8th round of the 2010 NBA Development League Draft by the Idaho Stampede. Through 3 games with Idaho, he was averaging 6 points, 4 rebounds and 3 assists in 23.3 minutes. Despite these performances, Tiller was waived in November 2010.

After playing two seasons in the Polish Basketball League for Siarka Tarnobrzeg, Tiller signed with Landstede Basketbal in the Netherlands in 2013. In his second season, Landstede was eliminated 3–4 in the Semi-finals by SPM Shoeters Den Bosch. After the regular season, Tiller was given a place in the DBL All-Defense Team.

For the 2015–16 season, Tiller signed with Polpharma Starogard Gdański of the Polish PLK.

Tiller returned to Landstede Basketbal on August 10, 2016. In the 2016–17 season, Tiller was named to the All-DBL Team, DBL All-Defense Team and was awarded the DBL Defensive Player of the Year Award.

== The "J.T. Tiller Rule" ==
On March 22, 2009, during a second-round NCAA Tournament game against Marquette, Tiller drove to the basket and drew a foul in a tie game with 5.5 seconds remaining. Tiller landed hard on his wrist, rendering him unable to shoot the two free throws awarded to him. Under NCAA rules at the time, Missouri coach Mike Anderson had the power to choose which player on his roster could shoot the free throws in place of Tiller. Anderson selected freshman Kim English, who emerged from the bench to bury both shots and secure the victory for the Tigers. Many in the Marquette camp were incensed that English, a 72-percent free throw shooter, was able to "pinch shoot" for Tiller after his injury at the discretion of the injured player's head coach.

Fewer than three months later, on June 9, 2009, an NCAA panel announced a rule change: In the case of an injured player, the opposing team's coach would be able to choose the replacement among the four remaining players on the floor.

The NCAA did not acknowledge Tiller's role in the rule change, but Missouri fans immediately created a nickname for the new policy: "The J.T. Tiller Rule."

== Statistics ==
Season	Team	League	PPG	RPG	APG	EFF
2011–12	Siarka Tarnobrzeg	DBL	12.5	4.1	3.3	12.9
2012–13	Siarka Tarnobrzeg	DBL	11.3	3.4	3.7	12.9
2013–14	Landstede Basketbal	DBL	12.5	4.8	3.7	14.4
2014–15	Landstede Basketbal	DBL	9.0	3.9	4.8	13.8
