= Derrick Chievous =

American basketball player (born 1967)

Personal information
- Born: July 3, 1967 (age 59) New York City, New York, U.S.
- Listed height: 6 ft 7 in (2.01 m)
- Listed weight: 195 lb (88 kg)

Career information
- High school: Holy Cross (Queens, New York)
- College: Missouri (1984–1988)
- NBA draft: 1988: 1st round, 16th overall pick
- Drafted by: Houston Rockets
- Playing career: 1988–1996
- Position: Small forward
- Number: 3, 33

Career history
- 1988–1990: Houston Rockets
- 1990–1991: Cleveland Cavaliers
- 1991–1992: Albany Patroons
- 1991–1992: Quad City Thunder
- 1992: Rapid City Thrillers
- 1992: San Miguel Beermen
- 1992–1993: Quad City Thunder
- 1992–1993: SYP Patronato Mallorca
- 1993–1994: Dafni
- 1995–1996: Quilmes
- 1996: APOEL
- 1998: Sportivo Independiente

Career highlights
- Greek League All-Star (1994 I); Second-team All-American – UPI (1987); Third-team All-American – AP (1987); 2× First-team All-Big Eight (1987, 1988); No. 3 retired by Missouri Tigers; Fourth-team Parade All-American (1984); McDonald's All-American (1984)
- Stats at NBA.com
- Stats at Basketball Reference
Medals
Men's basketball
Representing United States
Summer Universiade
Silver medal – second place	1985 Kobe	National team

Derrick Joseph Chievous (born July 3, 1967) is an American former professional basketball player. During his professional career, he played at the small forward position. Chievous played three seasons in the National Basketball Association (NBA), after being selected by the Houston Rockets, in the first round, with the 16th overall pick of the 1988 NBA draft.

== College career ==
Chievous played college basketball for the Missouri Tigers, from 1984 to 1988. He led the Tigers to three NCAA Tournament appearances. He also led them to Big Eight regular-season and tournament titles.

Chievous became the school's all-time scoring leader with 2,580 points over his collegiate career. Chievous was inducted into the University of Missouri Intercollegiate Athletics Hall of Fame as part of the Class of 1996. On November 1, 2012, it was announced that Chievous would be part of the "Class of 2012" inducted into the Missouri Sports Hall of Fame on November 15. On February 19, 2019, during a ceremony at halftime of a game between Missouri and Kentucky, the university retired Chievous' number 3 jersey.

== Professional career ==
Chievous was selected by the Houston Rockets, in the first round, with the 16th overall pick of the 1988 NBA draft. Chievous played in the NBA from 1988 to 1991, with the Houston Rockets and Cleveland Cavaliers. His best NBA season came in his rookie year, when he appeared in 81 games and averaged 9.3 points per game.

== Personal life ==
Chievous' son Quinton Chievous (b. 1992), played college basketball at the Tennessee Volunteers and Hampton Pirates.

== Career statistics ==
Legend
GP	Games played	GS	Games started	MPG	Minutes per game
FG%	Field goal percentage	3P%	3-point field goal percentage	FT%	Free throw percentage
RPG	Rebounds per game	APG	Assists per game	SPG	Steals per game
BPG	Blocks per game	PPG	Points per game	**Bold**	Career high

=== NBA ===
==== Regular season ====
Year	Team	GP	GS	MPG	FG%	3P%	FT%	RPG	APG	SPG	BPG	PPG
1988–89	Houston	**81**	**1**	**19.0**	.437	.208	.783	**3.2**	**1.0**	**.6**	**.1**	**9.3**
1989–90	Houston	41	0	12.0	**.506**	**.375**	.701	1.8	.7	**.6**	**.1**	6.0
1989–90	Cleveland	14	0	7.1	.357	.000	**.792**	1.1	.3	.2	**.1**	3.5
1990–91	Cleveland	18	0	6.1	.370	–	.563	1.0	.1	.2	.1	2.4
Career		154	1	14.5	.443	.242	.755	2.4	.7	.5	.1	7.1

==== Playoffs ====
Year	Team	GP	GS	MPG	FG%	3P%	FT%	RPG	APG	SPG	BPG	PPG
1989	Houston	**4**	0	**10.0**	.294	–	**.800**	**1.5**	.5	**.3**	**.3**	4.5
1990	Cleveland	3	0	9.3	**.600**	–	.778	1.0	**.7**	**.3**	.0	**6.3**
Career		7	0	9.7	.407	–	.789	1.3	.6	.3	.1	5.3

== See also ==
- List of NCAA Division I men's basketball career free throw scoring leaders
