= John Brown (basketball, born 1951) =

American basketball player (born 1951)

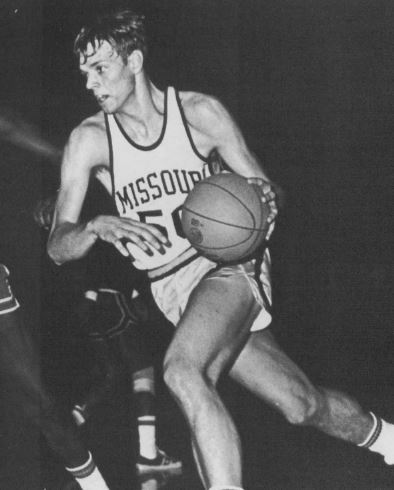
- Brown during his sophomore season at Missouri

Personal information
- Born: December 14, 1951 (age 74) Frankfurt, West Germany
- Listed height: 6 ft 7 in (2.01 m)
- Listed weight: 220 lb (100 kg)

Career information
- High school: Dixon (Dixon, Missouri)
- College: Missouri (1970–1973)
- NBA draft: 1973: 1st round, 10th overall pick
- Drafted by: Atlanta Hawks
- Playing career: 1973–1983
- Position: Small forward
- Number: 50, 32, 52

Career history
- 1973–1978: Atlanta Hawks
- 1978–1979: Chicago Bulls
- 1979: Utah Jazz
- 1980: Atlanta Hawks
- 1980–1982: Basket Mestre
- 1982–1983: Grifone Perugia

Career highlights
- NBA All-Rookie First Team (1974); Third-team All-American – AP, NABC (1973); 2× First-team All-Big Eight (1972, 1973); No. 50 retired by Missouri Tigers

Career NBA statistics
- Points: 3,614 (7.4 ppg)
- Rebounds: 2,126 (4.4 rpg)
- Assists: 703 (1.4 apg)
- Stats at NBA.com
- Stats at Basketball Reference

John Young Brown (born December 14, 1951) is an American former professional basketball player who played in the National Basketball Association (NBA). A forward, he played college basketball for the Missouri Tigers. He was a graduate of Dixon High School in Dixon, Missouri. Brown was selected for the 1972 Olympic team, but due to injury did not compete in the games.

Brown was selected tenth overall in the 1973 NBA draft by the Atlanta Hawks, and was named to the 1974 NBA All-Rookie Team. His final season was split between the Hawks and the Utah Jazz in 1979–80. Brown also played for the Chicago Bulls for one season and several years in Italy after leaving the NBA. He was also drafted by the Dallas Chaparrals in the second round of the 1973 American Basketball Association special circumstances draft as the final draft pick made under that franchise's old name; months after making that selection, the team would become the San Antonio Spurs ever since then.

On March 10, 2019, the University of Missouri retired Brown's number 50 jersey in a ceremony at halftime of their final home game of the 2018–19 season.

== Career statistics ==
Legend
| GP | Games played | GS | Games started | MPG | Minutes per game |
| FG% | Field goal percentage | 3P% | 3-point field goal percentage | FT% | Free throw percentage |
| RPG | Rebounds per game | APG | Assists per game | SPG | Steals per game |
| BPG | Blocks per game | PPG | Points per game | **Bold** | Career high |

=== NBA ===
==== Regular season ====
| Year | Team | GP | GS | MPG | FG% | 3P% | FT% | RPG | APG | SPG | BPG | PPG |
|---|---|---|---|---|---|---|---|---|---|---|---|---|
| 1973–74 | Atlanta | **77** | | 22.3 | .438 | | .751 | 5.7 | 1.5 | .4 | **.2** | 9.3 |
| 1974–75 | Atlanta | 73 | | **27.2** | .461 | | .740 | **5.9** | **1.8** | **.7** | **.2** | **11.2** |
| 1975–76 | Atlanta | 75 | | 23.4 | .442 | | .775 | 5.4 | 1.7 | .6 | **.2** | 7.9 |
| 1976–77 | Atlanta | **77** | | 18.2 | .457 | | .807 | 3.1 | 1.3 | .6 | .1 | 5.7 |
| 1977–78 | Atlanta | 75 | | 21.3 | .474 | | .825 | 4.0 | 1.4 | **.7** | .1 | 7.3 |
| 1978–79 | Chicago | **77** | **4** | 16.4 | **.479** | | .857 | 3.1 | 1.4 | .2 | .1 | 5.0 |
| 1979–80 | Utah | 4 | | 6.0 | .000 | – | **1.000** | 2.3 | 1.0 | .0 | .0 | 1.0 |
| 1979–80 | Atlanta | 28 | | 12.9 | .378 | – | .773 | 2.2 | .5 | .1 | .1 | 3.9 |
| Career | | 486 | 4 | 20.8 | .453 | – | .783 | 4.4 | 1.4 | .5 | .2 | 7.4 |

==== Playoffs ====
| Year | Team | GP | MPG | FG% | 3P% | FT% | RPG | APG | SPG | BPG | PPG |
|---|---|---|---|---|---|---|---|---|---|---|---|
| 1978 | Atlanta | 2 | 3.0 | – | | – | .0 | .0 | .0 | .0 | .0 |
| 1980 | Atlanta | **5** | **11.6** | **.308** | .000 | **1.000** | **2.0** | **.2** | **.2** | **.2** | **2.0** |
| Career | | 7 | 9.1 | .308 | .000 | 1.000 | 1.4 | .1 | .1 | .1 | 1.4 |
