= Marcus Denmon =

American basketball player

Personal information
- Born: March 20, 1990 (age 36) Kansas City, Missouri, U.S.
- Listed height: 6 ft 3 in (1.91 m)
- Listed weight: 185 lb (84 kg)

Career information
- High school: Hogan Preparatory Academy (Kansas City, Missouri)
- College: Missouri (2008–2012)
- NBA draft: 2012: 2nd round, 59th overall pick
- Drafted by: San Antonio Spurs
- Playing career: 2012–2024
- Position: Shooting guard

Career history
- 2012–2013: Élan Chalon
- 2013–2014: Tofaş
- 2014–2015: New Basket Brindisi
- 2015–2016: İstanbul BB
- 2016: Hunan Yongsheng
- 2016–2017: Gaziantep Basketbol
- 2017–2018: Panathinaikos
- 2018–2020: Zhejiang Golden Bulls
- 2020–2021: Shanghai Sharks
- 2022: Petkim Spor
- 2022–2023: Peristeri
- 2023: Anhui Dragons
- 2023–2024: Tofaş

Career highlights
- Greek League champion (2018); Greek League Top Scorer (2023); Greek All-Star (2022); Greek All-Star Game 3 Point Shootout Champion (2022); NBL China scoring champion (2016); Consensus second-team All-American (2012); 2× First-team All-Big 12 (2011, 2012)
- Stats at Basketball Reference

Marcus Edward Denmon II (born March 20, 1990) is an American former professional basketball player. He played for the University of Missouri. He was taken 59th overall by the San Antonio Spurs in the 2012 NBA draft.

== High school career ==
In his senior season at Hogan Preparatory Academy, Denmon averaged 28.5 points and 5.8 rebounds while leading Hogan Prep to the Class 3 State Championships. He won the 2008 DiRenna Award as the top high school player in Kansas City.

== College recruitment ==
College recruiting
Name	Hometown	School	Height	Weight	Commit date
Marcus Denmon; SG	Kansas City, MO	Hogan Prep	6 ft 1 in (1.85 m)	170 lb (77 kg)	Aug 20, 2007
Marcus Denmon; SG	Recruit ratings: Scout: Rivals: (40)				

== College career ==
Denmon committed to attend the University of Missouri on August 20, 2007.

A reserve his freshman and sophomore seasons, Denmon started 33 out of 34 games his junior season. As a junior, Denmon averaged 16.9 points per game while earning All-Big 12 First Team, NABC All-District, and USBWA All-District honors.

On August 3, 2011, Denmon was named to the 2011 USA Basketball Men's World University Games roster.

As a senior, Denmon 17.7 points per game and 5 rebounds per game, earning second-team Consensus All-American, All-Big 12 First team, and USBWA All-District honors. Denmon was also a finalist for the John R. Wooden Award.

With 107 victories, teammates Denmon, Kim English, Laurence Bowers, and Steve Moore won more games than any senior class in Mizzou basketball history.

== Professional career ==
=== Europe ===
On July 25, 2012, Denmon signed a one-year contract with the French Pro A League club Élan Chalon. On October 5, 2012, Denmon suffered a broken foot in the team's opening game against ASVEL Basket. After undergoing surgery, Denmon returned to play on January 26, 2013, against JDA Dijon Basket. After the season, he then signed a 1-year contract with the Tofas S.K. of the Turkish Basketball League.

On August 16, 2014, Denmon was signed by Italian team New Basket Brindisi.

On August 3, 2015, Denmon returned to Turkey and signed with İstanbul Büyükşehir Belediyespor.

On September 27, 2016, Denmon signed with Gaziantep Basketbol.

On July 12, 2017, Denmon signed a two-year (1+1) contract with Greek club Panathinaikos. His team option was picked up on June 25, 2018, and he was bound to remain with the Euroleague team for another campaign. However, his contract was bought out by Chinese club Zhejiang Golden Bulls a month later.

On June 25, 2019, Denmon's return option to Panathinaikos was exercised by the EuroLeague club, after his successful stint in China. The new, two-year contract was put into dispute by Denmon's manager, Miško Ražnatović and Panathinaikos accepted to accommodate the player's demand, providing that he pays the designated €250.000 contract buy-out.

=== China ===
On July 25, 2018, Denmon signed with the Zhejiang Golden Bulls of the Chinese Basketball Association (CBA). He averaged 33.5 points per game in the 2018–2019 season and 28.4 points per game in the 2019–2020 season. On September 10, 2020, Denmon signed with the Shanghai Sharks. He averaged 17.7 points, 3.7 assists, 3.4 rebounds, and 1.1 steals per game. On January 23, 2022, Denmon signed with the Beijing Royal Fighters.

=== Return to Europe ===
On February 24, 2022, Denmon signed with Petkim Spor of the Turkish Basketball Super League.

On July 6, 2022, Denmon returned to Greece, signing with Peristeri of the Greek Basket League and the Basketball Champions League. In 32 league games, he averaged 16 points, 2.4 rebounds, 2.5 assists, 1.6 steals and 2 turnovers, playing around 30 minutes per contest. Denmon was the leading scorer of the entire Greek Basket League for the 2022-2023 campaign. He scored a total of 670 points in domestic and international competitions combined. On June 28, 2023, he amicably parted ways with the Greek club.

On December 20, 2023, he signed with Tofaş of the Basketbol Süper Ligi (BSL).

=== NBA draft rights ===
Denmon was drafted on June 28, 2012, by the San Antonio Spurs with the 59th selection in the draft. The Spurs retained his draft rights until they renounced them on September 23, 2016.

== Career statistics ==
=== EuroLeague ===
Year	Team	GP	GS	MPG	FG%	3P%	FT%	RPG	APG	SPG	BPG	PPG	PIR
2017–18	Panathinaikos	28	8	13.0	.391	.417	.833	0.8	0.3	0.5	0.2	5.6	3.8
Career		28	8	13.0	.391	.417	.833	0.8	0.3	0.5	0.2	5.6	3.8

== Personal life ==
On December 7, 2010, Denmon's cousin, Marion, known as "Lil Daddy" died three days after being shot while riding in a car.

In March 2025, Denmon and his brother, Malik, were arrested on charges of robbery with a dangerous weapon in Kansas City after courts said they stole thousands from a woman at a Tulsa apartment complex.
