= Jabari Brown =

American basketball player (born 1992)

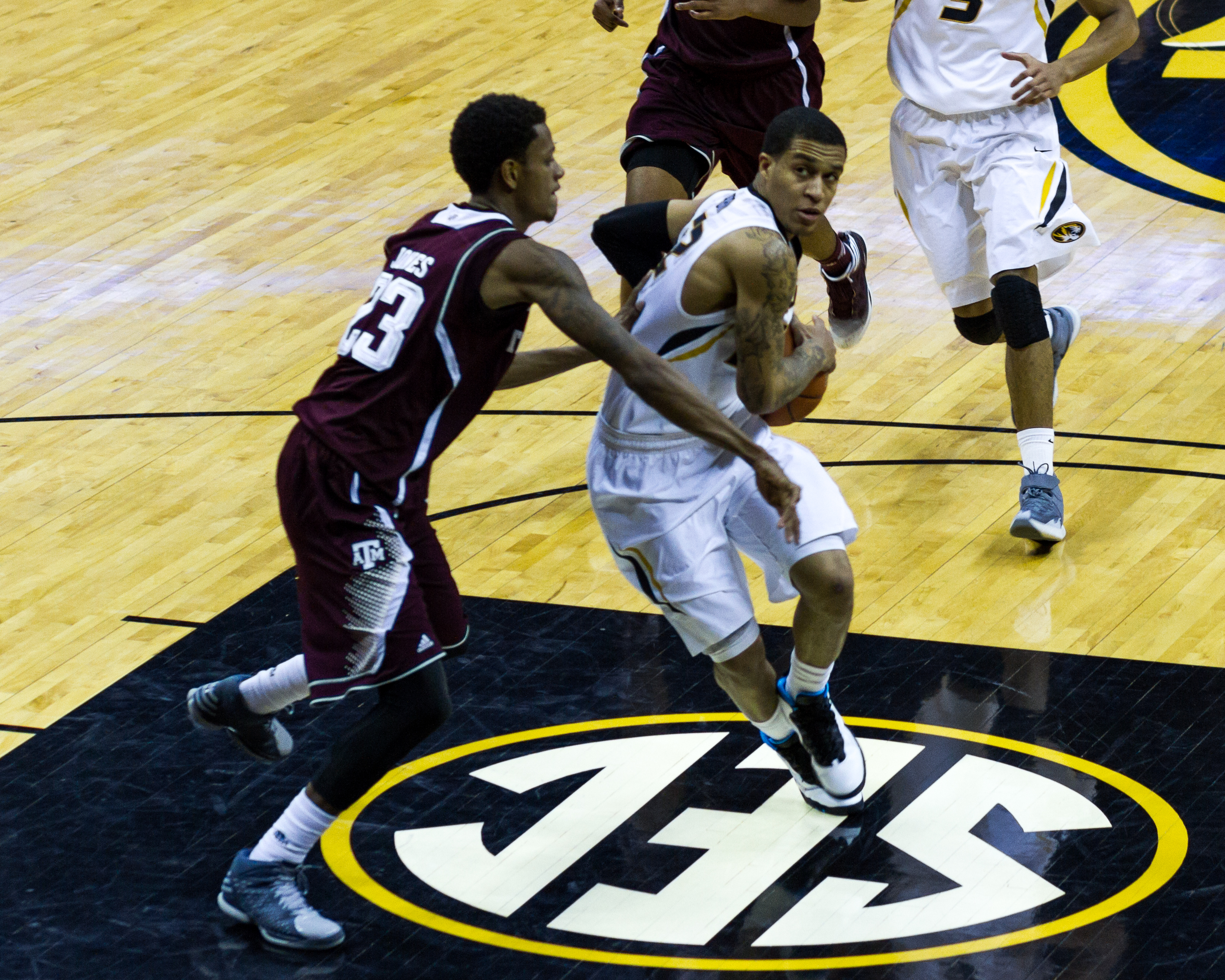
- Brown at Mizzou Arena in 2014

Personal information
- Born: December 18, 1992 (age 33) Berkeley, California, U.S.
- Listed height: 6 ft 4 in (1.93 m)
- Listed weight: 202 lb (92 kg)

Career information
- High school: Findlay Prep (Henderson, Nevada); Oakland (Oakland, California)
- College: Oregon (2011–2012); Missouri (2012–2014)
- NBA draft: 2014: undrafted
- Playing career: 2014–2020
- Position: Shooting guard / point guard

Career history
- 2014–2015: Los Angeles D-Fenders
- 2015: Los Angeles Lakers
- 2015–2016: Foshan Long Lions
- 2016: Los Angeles D-Fenders
- 2016–2017: Jilin Northeast Tigers
- 2017: Santa Cruz Warriors
- 2018: Jiangsu Dragons
- 2018: Santa Cruz Warriors
- 2019–2020: Rio Grande Valley Vipers

Career highlights
- All-NBA D-League Third Team (2015); NBA D-League All-Rookie Second Team (2015); NBA D-League All-Star (2015); First-team All-SEC (2014)
- Stats at NBA.com
- Stats at Basketball Reference

Jabari Akil Brown (born December 18, 1992) is a former American professional basketball player, who last played for the Rio Grande Valley Vipers of the NBA G League. He played college basketball for the Missouri Tigers where as a junior he led the SEC in scoring with an average of 19.9 points per game. Brown was also named to the All-SEC first team in 2014.

== High school career ==
Brown started his junior year of high school Findlay Prep in Henderson, Nevada, where he averaged 16 points per game before transferring mid-year to Oakland High School, returning to his hometown of Oakland, California. For the rest of his junior campaign, he averaged 23.5 points, 3.4 rebounds and 1.2 assists per game for Oakland High.

As a senior in 2010–11, Brown averaged 23.8 points and 4.1 rebounds per game as a senior for Oakland High. He was ranked the No. 19 national prospect in the class of 2011 and named a Jordan Brand All-American; he averaged nearly one point per minute in the All-America Game, scoring 14 points in 15 minutes.

== College career ==
Brown joined the Oregon Ducks men's basketball team for his freshman season in 2011–12. However, after playing 51 total minutes in two games for Oregon, Brown decided to transfer to the University of Missouri. As a sophomore in 2012–13, Brown averaged 13.7 points per game in helping Mizzou to a 23–11 record. Brown stepped up in his junior season and became the leader for his Mizzou team. Brown averaged a league-leading 19.9 points per game as he was named to the All-SEC first team and NABC Division I All-District 21 first team. Brown also made the Dean's List in the fall 2012 semester as a sophomore.

In April 2014, he declared for the NBA draft, forgoing his final year of college eligibility.

=== College statistics ===
Year	Team	GP	GS	MPG	FG%	3P%	FT%	RPG	APG	SPG	BPG	PPG
2011–12	Oregon	2	2	25.5	.273	.143	.417	2.0	.5	.5	.0	6.0
2012–13	Missouri	25	24	32.7	.404	.366	.785	3.4	1.4	.7	.0	13.7
2013–14	Missouri	35	35	37.0	.467	.410	.797	4.4	1.9	.6	.1	19.9

== Professional career ==
=== D-League / Los Angeles Lakers (2014–2015) ===
After going undrafted in the 2014 NBA draft, Brown joined the Houston Rockets for the 2014 NBA Summer League. On September 23, 2014, he signed with the Los Angeles Lakers. However, he was later waived by the Lakers on October 25 after appearing in four preseason games. On November 1, he was acquired by the Los Angeles D-Fenders of the NBA Development League as an affiliate player of the Lakers. On January 10, 2015, he scored a D-League season-high of 50 points on 16-of-22 shooting in a 124–99 win over the Sioux Falls Skyforce. He went on to play for the Futures All-Star team in the 2015 NBA D-League All-Star Game.

On March 10, 2015, Brown signed a 10-day contract with the Lakers to help the team deal with numerous injuries. Los Angeles had to use an NBA hardship exemption in order to sign him as he made their roster stand at 16, one over the allowed limited of 15. On March 21, he signed a second 10-day contract with the Lakers. After scoring 22 points against the Philadelphia 76ers on March 30, Brown signed a multi-year deal with the Lakers the following day. In the regular season finale on April 15, Brown scored 32 points on 9-of-19 shooting in a loss to the Sacramento Kings. On October 26, he was waived by the Lakers prior to the start of the 2015–16 season.

=== Foshan Long Lions (2015–2016) ===
In November 2015, Brown signed with the Foshan Long Lions of the Chinese Basketball Association. In 27 games for Foshan in 2015–16, he averaged 32.4 points, 3.8 rebounds, 2.5 assists and 1.1 steals per game.

=== Los Angeles D-Fenders (2016) ===
On March 2, 2016, Brown was reacquired by the Los Angeles D-Fenders. The next day, he made his season debut in a 124–103 win over the Bakersfield Jam, recording 26 points, one rebound, two assists and one steal in 27 minutes. On April 7, he was waived by the D-Fenders after suffering a season-ending injury.

=== Jilin Northeast Tigers (2016–2017) ===
On September 23, 2016, Brown signed with the Milwaukee Bucks. However, he was later waived by the Bucks on October 5. The next day, he signed with the Jilin Northeast Tigers, returning to China for the 2016–17 season. In 30 games for Jilin, Brown averaged 33.9 points, 4.2 rebounds and 3.1 assists in 32.9 minutes.

=== Santa Cruz Warriors (2017) ===
On March 8, 2017, Brown was acquired by the Santa Cruz Warriors.

He would later play for the Golden State Warriors in the 2017 NBA Summer League.

=== Jiangsu Dragons (2018) ===
On January 9, 2018, Brown signed with the Jiangsu Dragons of the Chinese Basketball Association. On January 25, he left the team after MarShon Brooks's return.

=== Return to Santa Cruz (2018) ===
On February 21, 2018, Brown re-signed with the Santa Cruz Warriors.

=== Rio Grande Valley Vipers (2019–present) ===
On November 30, 2019, Rio Grande Valley Vipers announced that they had acquired Brown. Brown was sidelined with an injury until December. He was suspended one game without pay after leaving the bench during an altercation in a 132–109 loss to the Memphis Hustle on December 17.

== Career statistics ==
Legend
GP	Games played	GS	Games started	MPG	Minutes per game
FG%	Field goal percentage	3P%	3-point field goal percentage	FT%	Free throw percentage
RPG	Rebounds per game	APG	Assists per game	SPG	Steals per game
BPG	Blocks per game	PPG	Points per game	**Bold**	Career high

=== NBA ===
==== Regular season ====
Year	Team	GP	GS	MPG	FG%	3P%	FT%	RPG	APG	SPG	BPG	PPG
2014–15	L.A. Lakers	19	5	29.9	.412	.371	.753	1.9	1.1	.6	.1	11.9
Career		19	5	29.9	.412	.371	.753	1.9	1.1	.6	.1	11.9
