= Missouri Tigers men's basketball =

NCAA Division I men's basketball team representing the University of Missouri

2026–27 Missouri Tigers men's basketball team
- University: University of Missouri
- First season: 1906–07; 120 years ago
- Athletic director: Laird Veatch
- Head coach: Dennis Gates; 5th season, 75–58 (.564)
- Location: Columbia, Missouri
- Arena: Mizzou Arena (capacity: 15,061)
- NCAA division: Division I
- Conference: SEC
- Nickname: Tigers
- Colors: Black and gold
- All-time record: 1,758–1,271 (.580)
- NCAA tournament record: 23–30 (.434)

NCAA Division I tournament Elite Eight
- 1944, 1976, 1994*, 2002, 2009
Other NCAA Division I tournament results
Sweet Sixteen	1976, 1980, 1982, 1989, 1994*, 2002, 2009
Appearances	1944, 1976, 1978, 1980, 1981, 1982, 1983, 1986, 1987, 1988, 1989, 1990, 1992, 1993, 1994*, 1995, 1999, 2000, 2001, 2002, 2003, 2009, 2010, 2011, 2012, 2013, 2018, 2021, 2023, 2025, 2026

Conference tournament champions
- Big Eight: 1978, 1982, 1987, 1989, 1991, 1993 Big 12: 2009, 2012

Conference regular-season champions
- MVC: 1918, 1920, 1921, 1922 Big Eight: 1930, 1939, 1940, 1976, 1980, 1981, 1982, 1983, 1987, 1990, 1994

Uniforms
Home	Away	Alternate
- * vacated by NCAA

The Missouri Tigers men's basketball team represents the University of Missouri in the SEC. Prior to the 2012–2013 season, the basketball team represented the school in the Big 12 Conference. They are located in Columbia, Missouri, playing home games at Mizzou Arena (15,061). The team last played in the NCAA Division I men's basketball tournament in 2025. The Tigers' season in 2022–23 was their first under head coach Dennis Gates, who was hired away from Cleveland State to replace the fired Cuonzo Martin. The Missouri men's basketball program was a charter member of the Big 12 Conference, formed from the Big Eight Conference in 1996. Entering the 2023–24 season the Tigers had an all-time record of 1,691–1,245 and a winning percentage of .576.

== History ==
=== The Early Years and Conference Foundation (1907–1928) ===
The University of Missouri men's basketball program was founded in the 1907–08 season, with the team playing its first game on January 12, 1907, a decisive 65–5 victory over Central College of Fayette. The program was a charter member of the Missouri Valley Intercollegiate Athletic Association (MVIAA), the conference that would later evolve into the Big Eight. The Tigers achieved early conference success under coaches like Walter Meanwell and Craig Ruby.

==== Historical national championship selections ====
While Missouri has never won the NCAA Tournament (established in 1939) or been officially recognized by the NCAA as a national champion, the program was twice retroactively selected as a top team by the Premo-Porretta Power Poll. The 1920–21 and 1921–22 teams, which won conference titles, were retroactively designated as the top teams in the nation by the poll, an unofficial mathematical rating system used to rank the strongest college basketball teams from the pre-tournament era. These selections are not officially recognized by the NCAA, and the university does not claim any national title.

=== The Big Six/Big Eight Eras and First NCAA Appearances (1928–1975) ===
Following the split of the MVIAA, Missouri became a member of the Big Six Conference in 1928, later evolving into the Big Seven and then the Big Eight. Under coach George Edwards (1926–1946), the Tigers won three Big Six regular-season titles. Edwards also led the program to its first-ever appearance in the NCAA Tournament in 1944, where the Tigers advanced to the regional semifinal (now known as the Elite Eight).

The team played in the Brewer Fieldhouse for decades before moving into the Hearnes Center in 1972, a move that significantly boosted the program's profile and attendance capacity.

=== The Norm Stewart Era: Big Eight Dominance (1976–1999) ===
The longest and most successful coaching tenure in program history belongs to Norm Stewart, an alumnus who coached the Tigers for 32 seasons (1967–1999). Stewart won 634 games at Missouri, more than the program had won in its entire 60-year history before his arrival.

The Stewart era was defined by Big Eight success and a fierce rivalry with the Kansas Jayhawks ("The Border War"). Stewart's teams won eight Big Eight regular-season championships and six conference tournament titles. His teams reached the Elite Eight of the NCAA Tournament twice (1976 and 1994), though the 1994 appearance was later vacated by the NCAA. The 1993–94 team achieved a perfect 14–0 conference record, earning Stewart multiple national coach of the year awards. Stewart also co-founded the Coaches vs. Cancer program following his own battle with the disease.

=== Big 12 and Modern Runs (2000–2012) ===
Following Stewart's retirement, the program saw a renewed burst of NCAA Tournament success under Quin Snyder and Mike Anderson. Snyder led the Tigers to four NCAA Tournament appearances, including an Elite Eight run in 2002. Anderson, who ran a high-tempo style dubbed "The Fastest 40 Minutes in Basketball," led the Tigers to a school-record 31 wins in the 2008–09 season. That team captured the Big 12 Tournament Championship and advanced to the Elite Eight. Anderson led the team to three consecutive NCAA Tournament appearances (2009–2011).

In 2004, the team moved into its current home, Mizzou Arena. The program concluded its Big 12 membership in its final year, 2012, by winning the conference tournament championship.

=== The SEC Era (2012–Present) ===
The University of Missouri officially joined the Southeastern Conference (SEC) in July 2012, concluding its long history in the Big Eight and Big 12 conferences. The transition brought new rivalries and challenges in one of the nation's premier basketball leagues. While the program has yet to win an SEC regular-season or tournament title, it has secured multiple NCAA Tournament berths during the SEC era, including a successful run under current coach Dennis Gates (hired in 2022).

== Coaching history ==
=== Current coaching staff ===
- Dennis Gates – Men's Basketball Head Coach
- Kyle Smithpeters – Associate Head Coach
- Dickey Nutt – Assistant Coach
- Steve Wright – Assistant Coach
- Matt Cline – Offensive Coordinator
- Ryan Sharbaugh – Defensive Coordinator
- Griffin McHone – Director of Basketball Operations
- Tim Fuller – General Manager
- David Carter – Assistant to the Head Coach / Analytics
- Sean Conaty – Director of Basketball Athletic Performance
- Chris Perrin – Senior Athletic Trainer
- Latisha Mayes – Executive Staff Assistant

== Record vs. Big 12 opponents (1996-2012) ==
Missouri vs.	Overall Record	at Columbia	at Opponent's Venue	at Neutral Site	Last 5 Meetings	Last 10 Meetings	Current Streak	During Time in Big 12
Baylor	MU, 16–10	MU, 10–2	BU, 6–4	Tied, 2–2	MU, 4–1	MU, 7–3	W 4	MU, 13–6
Iowa State	MU, 151–86	MU, 87–21	ISU, 60–48	MU, 16–5	MU, 3-2	MU, 8–2	W 1	MU, 20–14
Kansas	KU, 175–95	KU, 66–57	KU, 90–31	KU, 19–7	KU, 4–1	KU, 8–2	L 3	KU, 25–10
Kansas State	KSU, 121–116	MU, 64–42	KSU, 62–44	KSU, 17–8	KSU, 5–0	KSU, 7–3	L 5	MU, 18–15
Oklahoma	OU, 115–97	MU, 62–31	OU, 66–21	OU, 18–14	OU, 3–2	tied, 5–5	L 3	OU, 13–11
Oklahoma State	MU, 77–42	MU, 45–7	OSU, 29–21	MU, 10–6	MU, 3–2	MU, 6-4	L 1	MU, 11–9
Texas	MU, 14–12	MU, 7–4	UT, 6–4	MU, 3–2	MU, 4–1	MU, 6–4	W 3	UT, 11–9
Texas A&M	TAMU, 24-20	TAMU, 10-8	TAMU, 13-7	MU, 5–1	TAMU, 3–2	TAMU, 6-4	L 1	Tied, 10–10
Texas Tech	MU, 15–8	MU, 8–2	TTU, 6–3	MU, 4–0	MU, 5–0	MU, 8–2	W 7	MU, 13–7
*As of March 12, 2023

== Record vs. other opponents (at least 15 games played) ==
Missouri vs.	Overall Record	at Columbia	at Opponent's Venue	at Neutral Site	Last 5 Meetings	Last 10 Meetings	Current Streak
Colorado	MU, 99–53	MU, 57–11	CU, 34–30	MU, 12–8	MU, 4–1	MU, 9–1	W 1
Creighton	MU, 9–7	MU, 3–2	Tied, 4–4	MU, 2–1	MU, 3–2	CU, 6–4	L 1
Drake	MU, 27–7	MU, 17–3	MU, 10–4	Tied, 0–0	MU, 4–1	MU, 8–2	W 4
Illinois	UI, 33–20	Tied, 3–3	UI, 4–1	UI, 26–16	MU, 3-2	UI, 6–4	W 1
Indiana	Tied, 9–9	MU, 5–3	IU, 6–3	MU, 1–0	MU, 4–1	Tied, 5–5	W 3
Iowa	UI, 10–7	MU, 4–2	UI, 7–2	Tied, 1–1	MU, 3–2	Tied, 5–5	W 2
Nebraska	MU, 126–93	MU, 70–25	NU, 56–42	MU, 14–12	MU, 3–2	Tied, 5–5	L 1
Saint Louis	MU, 21–19	SLU, 12–10	MU, 11–6	SLU, 1–0	MU, 3–2	Tied, 5–5	W 2
Washington U. of StL	MU, 71–29	MU, 42–8	MU, 29–21	Tied, 0–0	MU, 5–0	MU, 8–2	W 7
*As of March 18, 2023

== Record vs. SEC opponents ==
Missouri vs.	Overall Record	at Columbia	at Opponent's Venue	at Neutral Site	Last 5 Meetings	Last 10 Meetings	Current Streak	Since Joining SEC
Alabama	UA, 14–7	MU, 5-4	UA, 7–1	UA, 3–1	UA, 3-2	UA, 6–4	L 3	UA, 10–6
Arkansas	UA, 33-27	MU, 17–12	UA, 19–10	UA, 2–0	UA, 4-1	UA, 6-4	W 1	UA, 14–9
Auburn	AU, 9-6	MU, 4-3	AU, 5–1	Tie, 1–1	AU, 4–1	AU, 8-2	L 3	AU, 9–6
Florida	UF, 9-4	Tied, 3-3	UF, 5–1	UF, 1–0	UF, 3-2	UF, 7-3	L 2	UF, 9–4
Georgia	MU, 11-8	MU, 5–2	UGA, 5–3	MU, 3–1	MU, 4-1	MU, 7-3	W 3	Tied, 8–8
Kentucky	UK, 13–3	UK, 4–3	UK, 7–0	UK, 2–0	UK, 3-2	UK, 7-3	W 1	UK, 10–3
LSU	LSU, 11–4	Tied, 3–3	LSU, 6–1	LSU, 2–0	LSU, 3-2	LSU, 8-2	W 2	LSU, 10–4
Mississippi State	MSU, 13-6	MU, 5–4	MSU, 9–1	Tied, 0–0	MSU, 4-1	MSU, 8-2	W 1	MSU, 12–4
Ole Miss	UM, 15–8	UM, 6–4	UM, 7-3	UM, 2–1	MU, 5-0	MU, 6-4	W 5	UM, 15–8
South Carolina	MU, 9-7	MU, 6–1	SC, 5-3	SC, 1–0	MU, 3–2	MU, 6-4	W 1	MU, 9–7
Tennessee	UT, 11–10	Tied, 5–5	UT, 5–4	Tied, 1–1	MU, 3-2	UT, 6-4	W 2	UT, 9–6
Texas A&M	TAMU, 24–20	TAMU, 10-8	TAMU, 13–7	MU, 5–1	TAMU, 3–2	TAMU, 6-4	L 2	TAMU, 14–7
Vanderbilt	MU, 9-7	MU, 7–0	VU, 6-2	VU, 1–0	MU, 4-1	MU, 6–4	W 1	MU, 7–4
*As of March 12, 2023

== Postseason ==
=== NCAA tournament results ===
The Tigers have appeared in the NCAA tournament 31 times. Their combined record is 23–30. However, their appearance in 1994 has been vacated by the NCAA, making their official record 20–29.

Year	Seed	Round	Opponent	Result
1944		Elite Eight; Regional 3rd Place Game	Utah; Pepperdine	L 35–45; W 61–46
1976		Round of 32; Sweet Sixteen; Elite Eight	Washington; Texas Tech; Michigan	W 69–67; W 86–75; L 88–95
1978		Round of 32	Utah	L 79–86 ^{2OT}
1980	#5	Round of 48; Round of 32; Sweet Sixteen	#12 San Jose State #4 Notre Dame #1 LSU	W 61–51; W 87–84 ^{OT} L 63–68
1981	#9	Round of 48	#8 Lamar	L 67–71
1982	#2	Round of 32; Sweet Sixteen	#7 Marquette #6 Houston	W 73–69; L 78–79
1983	#2	Round of 32	#7 Iowa	L 63–77
1986	#11	Round of 64	#6 UAB	L 64–66
1987	#4	Round of 64	#13 Xavier	L 69–70
1988	#6	Round of 64	#11 Rhode Island	L 80–87
1989	#3	Round of 64; Round of 32; Sweet Sixteen	#14 Creighton #11 Texas #2 Syracuse	W 85–69; W 108–89; L 80–83
1990	#3	Round of 64	#14 Northern Iowa	L 71–74
1992	#5	Round of 64; Round of 32	#12 West Virginia #4 Seton Hall	W 89–78; L 71–88
1993	#10	Round of 64	#7 Temple	L 61–75
1994*	#1	Round of 64; Round of 32; Sweet Sixteen; Elite Eight	#16 Navy #9 Wisconsin #4 Syracuse #2 Arizona	W 76–53; W 109–96; W 98–88 ^{OT} L 72–92
1995	#8	Round of 64; Round of 32	#9 Indiana #1 UCLA	W 65–60; L 74–75
1999	#8	Round of 64	#9 New Mexico	L 59–61
2000	#9	First Round	#8 North Carolina	L 84–70
2001	#9	First Round; Second Round	#8 Georgia #1 Duke	W 70–68; L 81–94
2002	#12	First Round; Second Round; Sweet Sixteen; Elite Eight	#5 Miami (FL) #4 Ohio State #8 UCLA #2 Oklahoma	W 93–80; W 83–67; W 82–73; L 75–81
2003	#6	First Round; Second Round	#11 Southern Illinois #3 Marquette	W 72–71; L 92–101 ^{OT}
2009	#3	First Round; Second Round; Sweet Sixteen; Elite Eight	#14 Cornell #6 Marquette #2 Memphis #1 Connecticut	W 78–59; W 83–79; W 102–91; L 75–82
2010	#10	First Round; Second Round	#7 Clemson #2 West Virginia	W 86–78; L 59–68
2011	#11	First Round	#6 Cincinnati	L 63–78
2012	#2	First Round	#15 Norfolk State	L 84–86
2013	#9	First Round	#8 Colorado State	L 72–84
2018	#8	First Round	#9 Florida State	L 54–67
2021	#9	First Round	#8 Oklahoma	L 68–72
2023	#7	First Round; Second Round	#10 Utah State #15 Princeton	W 76–65; L 63–78
2025	#6	First Round	#11 Drake	L 57–67
2026	#10	First Round	#7 Miami (FL)	L 66–80

* Vacated by the NCAA

==== NCAA Tournament seeding history ====
The NCAA began seeding the tournament with the 1979 edition.

Years →	'80	'81	'82	'83	'86	'87	'88	'89	'90	'92	'93	'94	'95	'99	'00	'01	'02	'03	'09	'10	'11	'12	'13	'18	'21	'23	'25	'26
Seeds→	5	9	2	2	11	4	6	3	3	5	10	1	8	8	9	9	12	6	3	10	11	2	9	8	9	7	6	10

=== NIT results ===
The Tigers have appeared in the National Invitation Tournament (NIT) eight times. Their combined record is 2–8.

Year	Round	Opponent	Result
1972	First Round	St. John's	L 81–82
1973	First Round	Massachusetts	L 71–78
1985	First Round	Saint Joseph's	L 67–68
1996	First Round; Second Round	Murray State; Alabama	W 89–85; L 49–72
1998	First Round	UAB	L 86–93
2004	First Round	Michigan	L 64–65
2005	First Round	DePaul	L 70–75
2014	First Round; Second Round	Davidson; Southern Miss	W 85–77; L 63–71

=== NCIT results ===
The Tigers appeared in one of the only two ever National Commissioners Invitational Tournaments. Their record is 0–1.

Year	Round	Opponent	Result
1975	Quarterfinals	Purdue	L 74–87

== Retired numbers ==
Missouri has retired eight jersey numbers, with the most recent ones being the numbers of Derrick Chievous and John Brown in 2019.

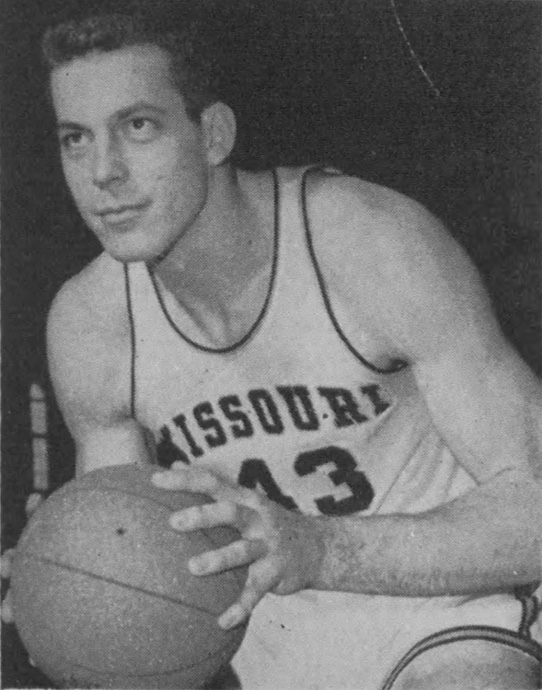
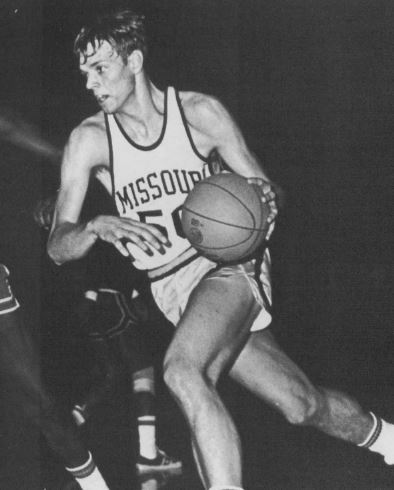
Bill Stauffer (left) and John Brown, whose numbers were retired by Missouri

Missouri Tigers retired numbers
No.	Player	Tenure	No. ret.	Ref.
3	Derrick Chievous	1984–1988	2019	
20	Jon Sundvold	1979–1983		
22	Norm Stewart	1953–1956	2001	
30	Willie Smith	1974–1976		
34	Doug Smith	1987–1991		
40	Steve Stipanovich	1979–1983		
43	Bill Stauffer	1949–1952		
50	John Brown	1970–1973	2019	

== Tigers in the NBA ==
=== Current ===
- Jordan Clarkson (New York Knicks)
- Michael Porter Jr. (Brooklyn Nets)
- Dru Smith (Miami Heat)
- Kobe Brown (Indiana Pacers)
- D'Moi Hodge (Dallas Mavericks)
- Tamar Bates (Denver Nuggets)

=== Former ===
- Kareem Rush (Los Angeles Lakers, Charlotte Bobcats, Indiana Pacers, Philadelphia 76ers, Los Angeles Clippers)
- Keyon Dooling (Los Angeles Clippers, Miami Heat, Orlando Magic, New Jersey Nets, Milwaukee Bucks, Boston Celtics, Memphis Grizzlies)
- Larry Drew (Sacramento Kings, Los Angeles Clippers, Los Angeles Lakers)
- Jon Sundvold (Seattle SuperSonics, San Antonio Spurs, Miami Heat)
- Steve Stipanovich (Indiana Pacers)
- Doug Smith (Dallas Mavericks)
- Byron Irvin (Portland Trail Blazers, Sacramento Kings, Washington Bullets)
- Anthony Peeler (Los Angeles Lakers, Vancouver Grizzlies, Minnesota Timberwolves, Sacramento Kings, Washington Wizards)
- Thomas Gardner (Chicago Bulls, Atlanta Hawks, Memphis Grizzlies, San Antonio Spurs)
- Derrick Chievous (Houston Rockets, Cleveland Cavaliers)
- Melvin Booker (Houston Rockets)
- John Brown (Atlanta Hawks, Chicago Bulls, Utah Jazz)
- Rickey Paulding (Detroit Pistons)
- Linas Kleiza (Denver Nuggets)
- Kim English (Detroit Pistons)
- Jabari Brown (Los Angeles Lakers)
- Al Eberhard (Detroit Pistons)
- Phil Pressey (Boston Celtics, Philadelphia 76ers)
- DeMarre Carroll (Memphis Grizzlies, Houston Rockets, Utah Jazz, Atlanta Hawks, Toronto Raptors, Brooklyn Nets)
- Jontay Porter (Memphis Grizzlies)
- Jonathan Williams (Los Angeles Lakers, Washington Wizards)

== Tigers in the NBA G-League ==
=== Former ===
- J. T. Tiller, Idaho Stampede
- Thomas Gardner, Austin Toros & Reno Bighorns
- Marshall Brown, Rio Grande Valley Vipers
- DeMarre Carroll, Dakota Wizards
- Leo Lyons, Dakota Wizards
- Kareem Rush, Los Angeles D-Fenders
- Alex Oriakhi, Erie BayHawks
- Jordan Clarkson, Los Angeles D-Fenders
- Jabari Brown, Los Angeles D-Fenders
- Stefhon Hannah, Reno Bighorns
- Jordan Barnett, Wisconsin Herd & Fort Wayne Mad Ants
- JaKeenan Gant, Fort Wayne Mad Ants
- Jonathan Williams, South Bay Lakers & Capital City Go-Go
- Jontay Porter, Wisconsin Herd & Motor City Cruise

== Tigers in European leagues ==
=== Current ===
- Jason Conley, Kouvot (Finland)
- JaKeenan Gant, Hapoel Be'er Sheva (Israel)
- Marcus Denmon, Peristeri B.C. (Greece)
- Tyler Stone, Israeli Basketball Premier League

Former

- Rickey Paulding, EWE Baskets Oldenburg (Germany)
- J.T. Tiller, Landstede Basketbal (Netherlands)
- Linas Kleiza, Olimpia Milano (Italy)

== Tigers in other leagues ==
=== Current ===
- Leo Lyons, Altiri Chiba, (Japan)
- Ricardo Ratliffe, Jeonju KCC Egis (South Korea)
- Jeremiah Tilmon, Brampton Honey Badgers (Canada)
- Johnathan Williams, Toyotsu Fighting Eagles Nagoya (Japan)

== Missouri Tigers All-Americans ==
- Fred Williams, 1916
- Craig Ruby, F, 1918–1919
- George Williams, C, 1920–1921
- Herb Bunker, G, 1921–1923
- Arthur Browning, F, 1922–1923
- Marshall Craig, F, 1930
- Max Collings, 1931
- John Lobsiger, G, 1939–1940
- Bill Stauffer, C, 1952
- Norm Stewart, G, 1956, former head coach at Northern Iowa (1961–1967) and Mizzou (1967–1999)
- Charles Henke, C, 1961
- John Brown, F, 1972–1973
- Willie Smith, G, 1976
- Ricky Frazier, F, 1982
- Steve Stipanovich, C, 1983
- Jon Sundvold, G, 1983
- Derrick Chievous, F, 1987
- Doug Smith, F, 1990
- Anthony Peeler, G, 1992
- Melvin Booker, G, 1994
- Marcus Denmon, G, 2012
- Phil Pressey, G, 2013

== Participations in FIBA competitions ==
- 1976 FIBA Intercontinental Cup: 5th place
