= 2012–13 Ole Miss Rebels men's basketball team =

American college basketball season

2012–13 Ole Miss Rebels men's basketball

SEC tournament champions

NCAA tournament, Round of 32
- Conference: Southeastern Conference
- Record: 27–9 (12–6 SEC)
- Head coach: Andy Kennedy (7th season)
- Assistant coaches: Sergio Rouco; Al Pinkins; Bill Armstrong
- Home arena: Tad Smith Coliseum

2012–13 Southeastern Conference men's basketball standings
	Conf.				Overall
Team	W		L	PCT	W		L	PCT
No. 14 Florida	14	–	4	.778	29	–	8	.784
Ole Miss †	12	–	6	.667	27	–	9	.750
Alabama	12	–	6	.667	23	–	13	.639
Kentucky	12	–	6	.667	21	–	12	.636
Missouri	11	–	7	.611	23	–	11	.676
Tennessee	11	–	7	.611	20	–	13	.606
Arkansas	10	–	8	.556	19	–	13	.594
LSU	9	–	9	.500	19	–	12	.613
Georgia	9	–	9	.500	15	–	17	.469
Vanderbilt	8	–	10	.444	16	–	17	.485
Texas A&M	7	–	11	.389	18	–	15	.545
South Carolina	4	–	14	.222	14	–	18	.438
Mississippi State	4	–	14	.222	10	–	22	.313
Auburn	3	–	15	.167	9	–	23	.281
† 2013 SEC tournament winner As of March 31, 2013; Rankings from AP poll

The 2012–13 Ole Miss Rebels men's basketball team represented the University of Mississippi in the 2012–13 college basketball season. The team's head coach was Andy Kennedy, in his seventh season at Ole Miss. The team played their home games at the Tad Smith Coliseum in Oxford, Mississippi as a member of the Southeastern Conference.

After finishing the regular season with a record of 23–8 (12–6 SEC), the Rebels claimed the 2013 SEC tournament championship by defeating Florida in the title game. They earned an automatic berth into the 2013 NCAA tournament as a #12 seed in the west region, where they advanced to the third round before falling to La Salle.

== Preseason ==
The Rebels posted a record of 20–14 (8-8 SEC) in the 2011–12 season and finished seventh in the SEC standings. The Rebels were invited to the 2012 NIT and lost in the first round to Illinois State.

Entering his seventh year as the Rebels’ head coach, Kennedy's 108 wins are the most by any coach in program history in a five-year span, and the Rebels’ 38 victories over Southeastern Conference foes are the most by a Rebel coach in his first five seasons. The 2012–13 Rebel squad will look to build on three straight seasons with 20 or more wins and a postseason berth.

== Roster ==
2012–13 Ole Miss Rebels men's basketball team
Players
Coaches

Pos.	#	Name	Height	Weight	Year	Hometown
G	1	Martavious Newby	6 ft 3 in (1.91 m)	205 lb (93 kg)	Fr	Memphis, Tennessee
F	2	Jason Carter	6 ft 8 in (2.03 m)	230 lb (104 kg)	Jr	Houston, Texas
G	3	Derrick Millinghaus	5 ft 10 in (1.78 m)	160 lb (73 kg)	Fr	Schenectady, New York
G	4	Demarco Cox	6 ft 8 in (2.03 m)	276 lb (125 kg)	Jr	Yazoo City, Mississippi
G	5	Cade Pepper	6 ft 2 in (1.88 m)	175 lb (79 kg)	Fr	Collierville, Tennessee
G	10	LaDarius White	6 ft 6 in (1.98 m)	208 lb (94 kg)	So	McComb, Mississippi
F	13	Anthony Pérez	6 ft 9 in (2.06 m)	205 lb (93 kg)	Fr	Cumaná, Venezuela
G	20	Nick Williams	6 ft 4 in (1.93 m)	210 lb (95 kg)	RS Sr	Mobile, Alabama
G	22	Marshall Henderson	6 ft 2 in (1.88 m)	180 lb (82 kg)	RS Jr	Hurst, Texas
F	23	Reginald Buckner	6 ft 9 in (2.06 m)	225 lb (102 kg)	Sr	Memphis, Tennessee
G	24	Will Norman	6 ft 5 in (1.96 m)	206 lb (93 kg)	RS So	Lafayette, Louisiana
F	25	Terry Brutus	6 ft 6 in (1.98 m)	235 lb (107 kg)	Fr	Spring Valley, New York
F	31	Murphy Holloway	6 ft 7 in (2.01 m)	240 lb (109 kg)	RS Sr	Irmo, South Carolina
G	32	Jarvis Summers	6 ft 4 in (1.93 m)	184 lb (83 kg)	So	Jackson, Mississippi
F	34	Aaron Jones	6 ft 8 in (2.03 m)	218 lb (99 kg)	So	Pascagoula, Mississippi

Head coach

- Andy Kennedy (UAB)

Assistant coach(es)

- Sergio Rouco (Nova Southeastern)
- Al Pinkins (NC State)
- Bill Armstrong (UAB)

Legend

- (C) Team captain
- (S) Suspended
- (I) Ineligible
- (W) Walk-on
- Injured
- Current redshirt

Roster
Last update: 2012-09-22

=== Depth chart ===
Pos.	Starting 5	Bench 1	Bench 2
C	Reginald Buckner	Demarco Cox
PF	Murphy Holloway	Jason Carter	Aaron Jones
SF	LaDarius White	Anthony Perez-Cortesia
SG	Marshall Henderson	Nick Williams
PG	Jarvis Summers	Derrick Millinghaus	Cade Peeper

== Schedule ==
Date time, TV	Rank^{#}	Opponent^{#}	Result	Record	High points	High rebounds	High assists	Site (attendance) city, state
Exhibition
Nov. 5, 2012*; 7:00 pm		Montevallo	W 77–62	0–0	19 – Henderson	8 – Buckner	7 – Summers	Tad Smith Coliseum (3,147); Oxford, Mississippi
Non-conference regular season
Nov. 9, 2012*; 8:00 pm		Mississippi Valley State	W 93–57	1–0	22 – Henderson	11 – Holloway	3 – Tied	Tad Smith Coliseum (4,992); Oxford, Mississippi
Nov. 13, 2012*; 7:00 pm		Coastal Carolina	W 90–72	2–0	27 – Henderson	12 – Holloway	6 – Summers	Tad Smith Coliseum (3,059); Oxford, Mississippi
Nov. 16, 2012*; 7:00 pm		Arkansas–Little Rock	W 92–52	3–0	19 – Millinghaus	11 – Buckner	5 – Millinghaus	Tad Smith Coliseum (3,251); Oxford, Mississippi
Nov. 20, 2012*; 7:00 pm		McNeese State	W 76–50	4–0	15 – Holloway	9 – Holloway	4 – Summers	Tad Smith Coliseum (3,511); Oxford, Mississippi
Nov. 23, 2012*; 4:00 pm		Lipscomb	W 91–45	5–0	23 – Holloway	8 – Holloway	6 – Summers	Tad Smith Coliseum (4,591); Oxford, Mississippi
Dec. 1, 2012*; 1:00 pm, ESPNU		Rutgers; SEC–Big East Challenge	W 80–67	6–0	18 – Henderson	15 – Holloway	5 – Summers	Tad Smith Coliseum (4,277); Oxford, Mississippi
Dec. 8, 2012*; 4:00 pm, ESPN3		at Middle Tennessee	L 62–65	6–1	17 – Henderson	9 – Tied	4 – Summers	Murphy Center (6,107); Murfreesboro, Tennessee
Dec. 14, 2012*; 7:00 pm, ESPN3		East Tennessee State	W 77–55	7–1	22 – Henderson	9 – Holloway	6 – Tied	Tad Smith Coliseum (3,411); Oxford, Mississippi
Dec. 19, 2012*; 10:00 pm, ESPNU		at Loyola Marymount	W 73–70	8–1	18 – Henderson	14 – Holloway	3 – Tied	Gersten Pavilion (3,021); Los Angeles
Dec. 22, 2012*; 3:00 pm, ESPNU		vs. Indiana State; Diamond Head Classic	L 85–87 ^{OT}	8–2	27 – Henderson	13 – Holloway	3 – Summers	Stan Sheriff Center (6,691); Honolulu, HI
Dec. 23, 2012*; 2:00 pm, ESPNU		vs. San Francisco; Diamond Head Classic	W 85–78	9–2	23 – Holloway	13 – Holloway	2 – Summers	Stan Sheriff Center (6,419); Honolulu, HI
Dec. 25, 2012*; 3:30 pm, ESPNU		at Hawaiʻi; Diamond Head Classic	W 81–66	10–2	18 – Holloway	9 – Holloway	6 – Summers	Stan Sheriff Center (6,052); Honolulu, HI
Jan. 4, 2013*; 8:00 pm, ESPN3		Fordham	W 95–68	11–2	21 – Henderson	13 – Holloway	3 – Summers	Tad Smith Coliseum (3,167); Oxford, Mississippi
SEC Regular Season
Jan. 9, 2013; 7:00 pm, SECN/ESPN3		at Tennessee	W 92–74	12–2 (1–0)	32 – Henderson	15 – Buckner	3 – Summers	Thompson–Boling Arena (17,059); Knoxville, Tennessee
Jan. 12, 2013; 7:00 pm, FSN/ESPN3		No. 10 Missouri	W 64–49	13–2 (2–0)	22 – Holloway	10 – Buckner	2 – Williams	Tad Smith Coliseum (9,173); Oxford, Mississippi
Jan. 15, 2013; 8:00 pm, ESPNU		at Vanderbilt	W 89–79 ^{OT}	14–2 (3–0)	26 – Henderson	11 – Buckner	3 – Tied	Memorial Gymnasium (8,851); Nashville, Tennessee
Jan. 19, 2013; 12:30 pm, SECN/ESPN3		Arkansas	W 76–64	15–2 (4–0)	16 – Henderson	11 – Holloway	7 – Summers	Tad Smith Coliseum (9,004); Oxford, Mississippi
Jan. 24, 2013; 6:00 pm, ESPN2	No. 23	Tennessee	W 62–56	16–2 (5–0)	28 – Henderson	8 – Buckner	7 – Summers	Tad Smith Coliseum (9,206); Oxford, Mississippi
Jan. 26, 2013; 7:00 pm, FSN/ESPN3	No. 23	at Auburn	W 63–61	17–2 (6–0)	17 – White	11 – Holloway	3 – Tied	Auburn Arena (8,740); Auburn, Alabama
Jan. 29, 2013; 8:00 pm, ESPN	No. 16	Kentucky	L 74–87	17–3 (6–1)	22 – White	9 – Buckner	5 – Summers	Tad Smith Coliseum (9,232); Oxford, Mississippi
Feb. 2, 2013; 6:00 pm, ESPNU	No. 16	at No. 4 Florida	L 64–78	17–4 (6–2)	25 – Henderson	7 – Holloway	3 – Summers	O'Connell Center (12,522); Gainesville, Florida
Feb. 6, 2013; 8:00 pm, CSS/ESPN3		Mississippi State	W 93–75	18–4 (7–2)	31 – Henderson	8 – Holloway	5 – Tied	Tad Smith Coliseum (8,299); Oxford, Mississippi
Feb. 9, 2013; 12:00 pm, CBS		at No. 21 Missouri	L 79–98	18–5 (7–3)	16 – Tied	4 – Tied	2 – Tied	Mizzou Arena (14,013); Columbia, Missouri
Feb. 13, 2013; 6:00 pm, ESPN3		at Texas A&M	L 67–69	18–6 (7–4)	13 – Tied	15 – Buckner	3 – Summers	Reed Arena (5,377); College Station, Texas
Feb. 16, 2013; 7:00 pm, ESPN2		Georgia	W 84–74 ^{OT}	19–6 (8–4)	25 – Henderson	10 – Buckner	4 – Summers	Tad Smith Coliseum (8,255); Oxford, Mississippi
Feb. 20, 2013; 6:00 pm, CSS/ESPN3		at South Carolina	L 62–63	19–7 (8–5)	19 – Holloway	13 – Holloway	3 – Summers	Colonial Life Arena (7,721); Columbia, South Carolina
Feb. 23, 2013; 4:00 pm, FSN/ESPN3		Auburn	W 88–55	20–7 (9–5)	28 – Henderson	10 – Holloway	6 – Summers	Tad Smith Coliseum (7,275); Oxford, Mississippi
Feb. 27, 2013; 8:00 pm, ESPN3		Texas A&M	W 82–73	21–7 (10–5)	18 – Henderson	9 – Holloway	4 – Tied	Tad Smith Coliseum (6,526); Oxford, Mississippi
Mar. 2, 2013; 4:00 pm, SECN/ESPN3		at Mississippi State	L 67–73	21–8 (10–6)	22 – Holloway	19 – Holloway	4 – Millinghaus	Humphrey Coliseum (8,140); Starkville, Mississippi
Mar. 5, 2013; 8:00 pm, ESPNU		Alabama	W 87–83	22–8 (11–6)	24 – Henderson	6 – Holloway	5 – Millinghaus	Tad Smith Coliseum (5,913); Oxford, Mississippi
Mar. 9, 2013; 12:30 pm, SECN/ESPN3		at LSU	W 81–67	23–8 (12–6)	22 – Henderson	8 – Holloway	6 – Summers	Maravich Center (10,187); Baton Rouge, Louisiana
SEC tournament
Mar. 15, 2013; 9:00 pm, SECN/ESPN3		vs. Missouri; Quarterfinals	W 64–62	24–8	27 – Henderson	13 – Holloway	4 – Holloway	Bridgestone Arena (18,192); Nashville, Tennessee
Mar. 16, 2013; 2:26 pm, ABC/ESPN3		vs. Vanderbilt; Semifinals	W 64–52	25–8	23 – Henderson	9 – Buckner	2 – Tied	Bridgestone Arena (14,574); Nashville, Tennessee
Mar. 17, 2013; 12:00 pm, ABC		vs. No. 13 Florida; Championship game	W 66–63	26–8	23 – Holloway	10 – Holloway	4 – White	Bridgestone Arena (12,138); Nashville, Tennessee
NCAA tournament
Mar. 22, 2013; 11:40 am, TruTV	No. (12 W)	vs. #18 (5 W) Wisconsin; Second round	W 57–46	27–8	19 – Henderson	12 – Buckner	3 – Summers	Sprint Center (18,301); Kansas City, Missouri
Mar. 24, 2013; 7:09 pm, TruTV	No. (12 W)	vs. (13 W) La Salle; Third round	L 74–76	27–9	21 – Henderson	13 – Holloway	6 – Summers	Sprint Center (18,498); Kansas City, Missouri
*Non-Conference Game. Rankings from AP poll. All times are in Central Time.
