= 2012–13 Arkansas Razorbacks men's basketball team =

American college basketball season

2012–13 Arkansas Razorbacks men's basketball
- Conference: Southeastern Conference
- Record: 19–13 (10–8 SEC)
- Head coach: Mike Anderson (2nd season)
- Home arena: Bud Walton Arena

2012–13 Southeastern Conference men's basketball standings
| | Conf. | | | | Overall |
| Team | W | | L | PCT | W | | L | PCT |
|---|---|---|---|---|---|---|---|---|
| No. 14 Florida | 14 | – | 4 | .778 | 29 | – | 8 | .784 |
| Ole Miss † | 12 | – | 6 | .667 | 27 | – | 9 | .750 |
| Alabama | 12 | – | 6 | .667 | 23 | – | 13 | .639 |
| Kentucky | 12 | – | 6 | .667 | 21 | – | 12 | .636 |
| Missouri | 11 | – | 7 | .611 | 23 | – | 11 | .676 |
| Tennessee | 11 | – | 7 | .611 | 20 | – | 13 | .606 |
| Arkansas | 10 | – | 8 | .556 | 19 | – | 13 | .594 |
| LSU | 9 | – | 9 | .500 | 19 | – | 12 | .613 |
| Georgia | 9 | – | 9 | .500 | 15 | – | 17 | .469 |
| Vanderbilt | 8 | – | 10 | .444 | 16 | – | 17 | .485 |
| Texas A&M | 7 | – | 11 | .389 | 18 | – | 15 | .545 |
| South Carolina | 4 | – | 14 | .222 | 14 | – | 18 | .438 |
| Mississippi State | 4 | – | 14 | .222 | 10 | – | 22 | .313 |
| Auburn | 3 | – | 15 | .167 | 9 | – | 23 | .281 |
† 2013 SEC tournament winner As of March 31, 2013; Rankings from AP poll

The 2012–13 Arkansas Razorbacks men's basketball team represented the University of Arkansas in the 2012–13 college basketball season. The team's head coach is Mike Anderson, who completed his second season at Arkansas after posting an 18–14 record during the 2011–12 season, where the Razorbacks finished ninth in the SEC. Arkansas finished seventh in the SEC, but a 1–12 record away from the state of Arkansas kept it from participating in the postseason. The team played their home games at Bud Walton Arena in Fayetteville, Arkansas, as a member of the SEC.

== Roster ==
2012–13 Arkansas Razorbacks men's basketball team
Players
Coaches

| Pos. | # | Name | Height | Weight | Year | Hometown |
|---|---|---|---|---|---|---|
| G | 00 | Rashad Madden | 6 ft 5 in (1.96 m) | 175 lb (79 kg) | So | Lepanto, Arkansas |
| G | 1 | Mardracus Wade | 6 ft 2 in (1.88 m) | 175 lb (79 kg) | Jr | Memphis, Tennessee |
| G | 2 | Alandise Harris (redshirt) | 6 ft 6 in (1.98 m) | 230 lb (104 kg) | Jr | Little Rock, Arkansas |
| G | 3 | Rickey Scott | 6 ft 3 in (1.91 m) | 202 lb (92 kg) | Jr | Irving, Texas |
| F | 4 | Coty Clarke | 6 ft 7 in (2.01 m) | 225 lb (102 kg) | Jr | Antioch, Tennessee |
| G | 5 | Anthlon Bell | 6 ft 3 in (1.91 m) | 190 lb (86 kg) | Fr | Bartlett, Tennessee |
| G | 11 | B. J. Young | 6 ft 3 in (1.91 m) | 175 lb (79 kg) | So | St. Louis, Missouri |
| G | 12 | Fred Gulley III | 6 ft 2 in (1.88 m) | 177 lb (80 kg) | Jr | Fayetteville, Arkansas |
| G | 13 | Charlie Henderson | 6 ft 5 in (1.96 m) | 200 lb (91 kg) | So | Columbia, Missouri |
| F | 14 | Davion Spivey | 6 ft 2 in (1.88 m) | 210 lb (95 kg) | So | Ruston, Louisiana |
| G | 20 | Kikko Haydar | 5 ft 11 in (1.8 m) | 165 lb (75 kg) | Jr | Fayetteville, Arkansas |
| F | 21 | Hunter Mickelson | 6 ft 10 in (2.08 m) | 236 lb (107 kg) | So | Jonesboro, Arkansas |
| F | 22 | JaCorey Williams | 6 ft 8 in (2.03 m) | 204 lb (93 kg) | Fr | Birmingham, Alabama |
| G | 23 | DeQuavious Wagner | 5 ft 10 in (1.78 m) | 176 lb (80 kg) | Fr | Alexandria, Louisiana |
| G | 24 | Michael Qualls | 6 ft 5 in (1.96 m) | 205 lb (93 kg) | Fr | Shreveport, Louisiana |
| F | 33 | Marshawn Powell | 6 ft 7 in (2.01 m) | 240 lb (109 kg) | RS Jr | Newport News, Virginia |

Head coach

- Mike Anderson (Tulsa)

Assistant coach(es)

- Melvin Watkins (Charlotte)
- T. J. Cleveland (Arkansas)
- Matt Zimmerman (Arkansas)

Legend

- (C) Team captain
- (S) Suspended
- (I) Ineligible
- (W) Walk-on
- Injured
- Current redshirt

Roster
Last update: 2012-09-15

== Schedule and results ==
| Date time, TV | Rank^{#} | Opponent^{#} | Result | Record | High points | High rebounds | High assists | Site (attendance) city, state |
Exhibition
| November 2, 2012*; 7:00 pm | | Southwest Baptist | W 106–78 | 0–0 | 17 – Bell | 7 – Williams | 4 – Tied | Bud Walton Arena (11,292); Fayetteville, Arkansas |
| November 5, 2012*; 7:00 pm | | LeMoyne–Owen | W 111–45 | 0–0 | 15 – Tied | 10 – Tied | 7 – Madden | Bud Walton Arena (–); Fayetteville, Arkansas |
Non-conference regular season
| November 9, 2012*; 7:00 pm | | Sam Houston State | W 73–68 | 1–0 | 20 – Clarke | 5 – Powell | 4 – Wade | Bud Walton Arena (12,253); Fayetteville, Arkansas |
| November 18, 2012*; 4:00 pm | | Longwood; Las Vegas Invitational | W 112–63 | 2–0 | 23 – Young | 10 – Clarke | 6 – Scott | Bud Walton Arena (5,835); Fayetteville, Arkansas |
| November 20, 2012*; 7:00 pm, RSN | | Florida A&M; Las Vegas Invitational | W 89–60 | 3–0 | 21 – Powell | 10 – Powell | 3 – Tied | Bud Walton Arena (11,828); Fayetteville, Arkansas |
| November 23, 2012*; 6:00 pm, ESPN3 | | vs. Arizona State; Las Vegas Invitational | L 68–83 | 3–1 | 29 – Young | 8 – Madden | 3 – Madden | Orleans Arena (N/A); Las Vegas |
| November 24, 2012*; 7:00 pm, ESPN3 | | vs. Wisconsin; Las Vegas Invitational | L 70–77 | 3–2 | 18 – Young | 11 – Clarke | 2 – Young, Scott | Orleans Arena (N/A); Las Vegas |
| November 30, 2012*; 7:30 pm, ESPN | | No. 6 Syracuse; SEC–Big East Challenge | L 82–91 | 3–3 | 25 – Young | 7 – Powell, Clarke | 3 – Wagner | Bud Walton Arena (18,370); Fayetteville, Arkansas |
| December 4, 2012*; 6:00 pm, ESPN2/ESPNU | | Oklahoma | W 81–78 | 4–3 | 33 – Powell | 6 – Powell | 8 – Young | Bud Walton Arena (12,548); Fayetteville, Arkansas |
| December 8, 2012*; 11:00 am, CBS | | at No. 3 Michigan | L 67–80 | 4–4 | 18 – Powell | 5 – Mickelson | 3 – Madden | Crisler Center (12,693); Ann Arbor, Michigan |
| December 15, 2012*; 7:00 pm, RSN/ESPN3 | | Alcorn State | W 97–59 | 5–4 | 18 – Powell | 7 – Powell, Qualls | 4 – Wagner, Qualls | Bud Walton Arena (12,484); Fayetteville, Arkansas |
| December 20, 2012*; 7:00 pm, RSN/ESPN3 | | Robert Morris | W 79–74 | 6–4 | 23 – Young | 9 – Powell | 5 – Young | Bud Walton Arena (11,887); Fayetteville, Arkansas |
| December 22, 2012*; 7:00 pm, RSN | | vs. Alabama A&M | W 95–68 | 7–4 | 20 – Powell | 8 – Clarke | 9 – Young | Verizon Arena (9,274); North Little Rock, Arkansas |
| December 29, 2012*; 7:00 pm, RSN/ESPN3 | | Northwestern State | W 79–61 | 8–4 | 26 – Young | 13 – Mickelson, Young | 7 – Young | Bud Walton Arena (13,472); Fayetteville, Arkansas |
| January 5, 2013*; 7:00 pm, RSN/ESPN3 | | Delaware State | W 86–51 | 9–4 | 19 – Young | 8 – Mickelson | 4 – Scott | Bud Walton Arena (12,644); Fayetteville, Arkansas |
SEC Regular Season
| January 9, 2013; 8:00 pm, ESPNU | | at Texas A&M | L 51-69 | 9–5 (0–1) | 13 – Young | 5 – Mickelson | 3 – Young | Reed Arena (5,539); College Station, Texas |
| January 12, 2013; 5:00 pm, FSN/ESPN3 | | Vanderbilt | W 56–33 | 10–5 (1–1) | 17 – Powell | 6 – Powell | 3 – Young | Bud Walton Arena (14,315); Fayetteville, Arkansas |
| January 16, 2013; 7:00 pm, SECN/ESPN3 | | Auburn | W 88–80 ^{2OT} | 11–5 (2–1) | 28 – Powell | 11 – Powell | 5 – Young | Bud Walton Arena (13,404); Fayetteville, Arkansas |
| January 19, 2013; 12:30 pm, SECN/ESPN3 | | at Ole Miss | L 64-76 | 11–6 (2–2) | 16 – Powell | 8 – Mickelson | 5 – Young, Haydar | Tad Smith Coliseum (9,004); Oxford, Mississippi |
| January 23, 2013; 8:00 pm, CSS/ESPN3 | | Mississippi State | W 96–70 | 12–6 (3–2) | 17 – Powell | 6 – Mickelson | 5 – Gulley | Bud Walton Arena (12,806); Fayetteville, Arkansas |
| January 26, 2013; 12:30 pm, SECN/ESPN3 | | at South Carolina | L 54–75 | 12–7 (3–3) | 22 – Powell | 13 – Powell | 4 – Gulley, Young | Colonial Life Arena (10,926); Columbia, South Carolina |
| January 31, 2013; 8:00 pm, ESPN2 | | at Alabama | L 56–59 | 12–8 (3–4) | 14 – Young | 6 – Clarke, Qualls | 4 – Young | Coleman Coliseum (11,132); Tuscaloosa, Alabama |
| February 2, 2013; 3:00 pm, ESPN/ESPN2 | | Tennessee | W 73–60 | 13–8 (4–4) | 25 – Young | 11 – Qualls | 5 – Madden | Bud Walton Arena (14,746); Fayetteville, Arkansas |
| February 5, 2013; 6:00 pm, ESPN | | No. 2 Florida | W 80–69 | 14–8 (5–4) | 13 – Young | 6 – Powell | 5 – Young | Bud Walton Arena (13,816); Fayetteville, Arkansas |
| February 9, 2013; 12:30 pm, CSS/ESPN3 | | at Vanderbilt | L 49-67 | 14–9 (5–5) | 13 – Wade | 7 – Clarke | 2 – Scott, Qualls | Memorial Gymnasium (10,886); Nashville, Tennessee |
| February 13, 2013; 8:00 pm, ESPN3 | | at Auburn | W 83–75 | 15–9 (6–5) | 25 – Young | 9 – Powell | 6 – Madden | Auburn Arena (5,783); Auburn, Alabama |
| February 16, 2013; 3:00 pm, ESPN | | Missouri | W 73–71 | 16–9 (7–5) | 24 – Powell | 7 – Clarke | 5 – Young | Bud Walton Arena (19,004); Fayetteville, Arkansas |
| February 21, 2013; 6:00 pm, ESPN2 | | Georgia | W 62–60 | 17–9 (8–5) | 17 – Bell | 6 – Wade | 3 – Haydar | Bud Walton Arena (13,443); Fayetteville, Arkansas |
| February 23, 2013; 6:00 pm, ESPNU | | at No. 5 Florida | L 54–71 | 17–10 (8–6) | 18 – Clarke | 7 – Clarke, Qualls | 2 – Tied | O'Connell Center (12,609); Gainesville, Florida |
| February 27, 2013; 7:00 pm, SECN/ESPN3 | | at LSU | L 60–65 | 17–11 (8–7) | 17 – Powell | 8 – Powell, Qualls | 2 – Wade | Maravich Center (7,891); Baton Rouge, Louisiana |
| March 2, 2013; 3:00 pm, CBS Sports | | Kentucky | W 73-60 | 18–11 (9–7) | 15 – Powell | 12 – Clarke | 6 – Clarke | Bud Walton Arena (18,139); Fayetteville, Arkansas |
| March 5, 2013; 6:00 pm, ESPN | | at Missouri | L 63–93 | 18–12 (9–8) | 27 – Young | 3 – Haydar | 3 – Madden, Young | Mizzou Arena (15,061); Columbia, Missouri |
| March 9, 2013; 1:00 pm, ESPNU | | Texas A&M | W 73–62 | 19–12 (10–8) | 14 – Wade | 8 – Clarke | 3 – Bell | Bud Walton Arena (15,423); Fayetteville, Arkansas |
2013 SEC tournament
| March 14, 2013; 6:30 pm, SECN/ESPN3 | | vs. Vanderbilt; Second Round | L 72–75 | 19–13 | 16 – Young | 9 – Powell | 3 – Wade, Young | Bridgestone Arena (11,798); Nashville, Tennessee |
*Non-Conference Game. Rankings from AP poll. All times are in Central Time.

== See also ==
- 2012–13 NCAA Division I men's basketball season
- 2012–13 NCAA Division I men's basketball rankings
