= 2012–13 Mississippi State Bulldogs basketball team =

American college basketball season

2012–13 Mississippi State Bulldogs men's basketball
- Conference: Southeastern Conference
- Record: 10–22 (4–14 SEC)
- Head coach: Rick Ray (1st season)
- Assistant coaches: George Brooks; Wes Flanigan; Chris Hollender
- Home arena: Humphrey Coliseum

2012–13 Southeastern Conference men's basketball standings
	Conf.				Overall
Team	W		L	PCT	W		L	PCT
No. 14 Florida	14	–	4	.778	29	–	8	.784
Ole Miss †	12	–	6	.667	27	–	9	.750
Alabama	12	–	6	.667	23	–	13	.639
Kentucky	12	–	6	.667	21	–	12	.636
Missouri	11	–	7	.611	23	–	11	.676
Tennessee	11	–	7	.611	20	–	13	.606
Arkansas	10	–	8	.556	19	–	13	.594
LSU	9	–	9	.500	19	–	12	.613
Georgia	9	–	9	.500	15	–	17	.469
Vanderbilt	8	–	10	.444	16	–	17	.485
Texas A&M	7	–	11	.389	18	–	15	.545
South Carolina	4	–	14	.222	14	–	18	.438
Mississippi State	4	–	14	.222	10	–	22	.313
Auburn	3	–	15	.167	9	–	23	.281
† 2013 SEC tournament winner As of March 31, 2013; Rankings from AP poll

The 2012–13 Mississippi State Bulldogs men's basketball team represented Mississippi State University in the 2012–13 college basketball season. The team's head coach was Rick Ray, in his first season at Mississippi State and as a head coach. The team played their home games at the Humphrey Coliseum in Starkville, Mississippi as a member of the Southeastern Conference.

== Pre-season ==
The Bulldogs posted a record of 21–12 (8-8 SEC) in the 2011–12 season and finished sixth in the SEC standings. The Bulldogs lost all five starters and four other lettermen from the previous season as well as replaced head coach Rick Stansbury after his retirement.

== Roster ==
2012–13 Mississippi State Bulldogs men's basketball team
Players
Coaches

Pos.	#	Name	Height	Weight	Year	Hometown
G	0	Jalen Steele	6 ft 3 in (1.91 m)	194 lb (88 kg)	Jr	Knoxville, Tennessee
G	1	Fred Thomas	6 ft 5 in (1.96 m)	180 lb (82 kg)	Fr	Jackson, Mississippi
G	2	Andre Applewhite (injured) (redshirt)	6 ft 5 in (1.96 m)	209 lb (95 kg)	Fr	Memphis, Tennessee
F	3	Colin Borchert	6 ft 8 in (2.03 m)	231 lb (105 kg)	Jr	Phoenix, Arizona
G	4	Trivante Bloodman	6 ft 0 in (1.83 m)	178 lb (81 kg)	So	Bronx, New York
C	5	Wendell Lewis (injured) (redshirt)	6 ft 9 in (2.06 m)	253 lb (115 kg)	Sr	Selma, Alabama
G	11	Jacoby Davis (injured) (redshirt)	6 ft 1 in (1.85 m)	191 lb (87 kg)	Fr	Charlotte, North Carolina
G	15	Baxter Price (W)	5 ft 9 in (1.75 m)	156 lb (71 kg)	Sr	Brandon, Mississippi
F	20	Gavin Ware	6 ft 9 in (2.06 m)	280 lb (127 kg)	Fr	Starkville, Mississippi
G	24	Tyson Cunningham (W)	6 ft 3 in (1.91 m)	194 lb (88 kg)	Jr	Columbus, Mississippi
F	25	Roquez Johnson	6 ft 7 in (2.01 m)	210 lb (95 kg)	So	Montgomery, Alabama
G	32	Craig Sword	6 ft 3 in (1.91 m)	194 lb (88 kg)	Fr	Montgomery, Alabama

Head coach

- Rick Ray (Grand View)

Assistant coach(es)

- George Brooks (Mississippi State)
- Wes Flanigan (Auburn)
- Chris Hollender (Evansville)

Legend

- (C) Team captain
- (S) Suspended
- (I) Ineligible
- (W) Walk-on
- Injured
- Current redshirt

Roster
Last update: 2012-09-19

== Schedule ==
Date time, TV	Rank^{#}	Opponent^{#}	Result	Record	High points	High rebounds	High assists	Site (attendance) city, state
Exhibition
Nov. 4, 2012*; 3:00 p.m.		William Carey	W 80–74	–	17 – Steele	8 – Borchert	3 – Tied	Humphrey Coliseum (1,472); Starkville, Mississippi
Non-conference regular season
Nov. 9, 2012*; 7:00 p.m.		at Troy	L 53–56	0–1	16 – Steele	7 – Tied	1 – Tied	Trojan Arena (5,120); Troy, Alabama
Nov. 13, 2012*; 7:00 p.m.		Florida Atlantic; Maui Invitational tournament	W 78–58	1–1	17 – Johnson	5 – Tied	7 – Bloodman	Humphrey Coliseum (6,140); Starkville, Mississippi
Nov. 19, 2012*; 5:00 p.m., ESPN2		vs. No. 9 North Carolina; Maui Invitational Tournament	L 49–95	1–2	12 – Johnson	9 – Ware	3 – Bloodman	Lahaina Civic Center (2,400); Maui, HI
Nov. 20, 2012*; 2:30 p.m., ESPN2		vs. Marquette; Maui Invitational Tournament	L 62–89	1–3	17 – Thomas	8 – Johnson	2 – Tied	Lahaina Civic Center (2,400); Maui, HI
Nov. 21, 2012*; 2:30 p.m., ESPNU		vs. Texas; Maui Invitational Tournament	L 55–69	1–4	18 – Johnson	7 – Ware	4 – Thomas	Lahaina Civic Center (2,400); Maui, HI
Nov. 27, 2012*; 7:00 p.m.		Alcorn State	W 60–42	2–4	14 – Tied	12 – Ware	2 – Tied	Humphrey Coliseum (6,101); Starkville, Mississippi
Dec. 1, 2012*; 12:00 p.m., ESPNU		at Providence; SEC–Big East Challenge	L 63–73	2–5	16 – Lewis	11 – Lewis	4 – Bloodman	Dunkin' Donuts Center (6,156); Providence, Rhode Island
Dec. 4, 2012*; 7:00 p.m.		UTSA	W 53–42	3–5	20 – Lewis	10 – Borchert	5 – Bloodman	Humphrey Coliseum (6,021); Starkville, Mississippi
Dec. 15, 2012*; 7:00 p.m., ESPNU		at Loyola–Chicago	L 51–59	3–6	14 – Thomas	5 – Tied	2 – Sword	Joseph J. Gentile Arena (3,321); Chicago
Dec. 22, 2012*; 2:00 p.m.		vs. Central Arkansas	W 79–72	4–6	22 – Ware	13 – Ware	3 – Tied	Mississippi Coliseum (2,217); Jackson, Mississippi
Dec. 30, 2012*; 3:00 p.m., ESPN3		Alabama A&M	L 57–59	4–7	14 – Sword	11 – Ware	3 – Thomas	Humphrey Coliseum (7,526); Starkville, Mississippi
Jan. 3, 2013*; 6:00 p.m., ESPN3		New Orleans	W 97–46	5–7	17 – Borchert	8 – Tied	5 – Bloodman	Humphrey Coliseum (6,028); Starkville, Mississippi
SEC Regular Season
Jan. 9, 2013; 7:00 p.m., ESPN3		South Carolina	W 56–54	6–7 (1–0)	18 – Sword	6 – Borchert	2 – Tied	Humphrey Coliseum (6,034); Starkville, Mississippi
Jan. 12, 2013; 12:45 p.m., SECN/ESPN3		at Georgia	W 72–61	7–7 (2–0)	21 – Steele	7 – Steele	5 – Bloodman	Stegeman Coliseum (5,891); Athens, Georgia
Jan. 16, 2013; 8:00 p.m., CSS/ESPN3		Alabama	L 43–75	7–8 (2–1)	10 – Thomas	5 – Tied	2 – Tied	Humphrey Coliseum (7,182); Starkville, Mississippi
Jan. 19, 2013; 3:00 p.m., SECN/ESPN3		at Tennessee	L 57–72	7–9 (2–2)	15 – Steele	9 – Ware	3 – Tied	Thompson–Boling Arena (17,584); Knoxville, Tennessee
Jan. 23, 2013; 8:00 p.m., CSS/ESPN3		at Arkansas	L 70–96	7–10 (2–3)	17 – Thomas	8 – Ware	2 – Tied	Bud Walton Arena (12,806); Fayetteville, Arkansas
Jan. 26, 2013; 7:00 p.m., FSN/ESPN2		No. 8 Florida	L 47–82	7–11 (2–4)	19 – Thomas	4 – Steele, Johnson	3 – Sword	Humphrey Coliseum (7,696); Starkville, Mississippi
Jan. 30, 2013; 8:00 p.m., ESPN3		Texas A&M	L 49–55 ^{OT}	7–12 (2–5)	14 – Ware	5 – Borchert	2 – Borchert, Steele, Bloodman	Humphrey Coliseum (6,858); Starkville, Mississippi
Feb. 2, 2013; 4:30 p.m., FSN/ESPN3		LSU	L 68–69	7–13 (2–6)	14 – Ware	7 – Ware	3 – Bloodman	Humphrey Coliseum (7,667); Starkville, Mississippi
Feb. 6, 2013; 8:00 p.m., CSS/ESPN3		at Ole Miss	L 75–93	7–14 (2–7)	17 – Sword	7 – Ware	5 – Bloodman	Tad Smith Coliseum (8,299); Oxford, Mississippi
Feb. 9, 2013; 4:00 p.m., FSN/ESPN3		at #2 Florida	L 58–83	7–15 (2–8)	16 – Ware	8 – Sword	5 – Sword	O'Connell Center (12,444); Gainesville, Florida
Feb. 13, 2013; 7:00 p.m., SECN/ESPN3		Missouri	L 36–78	7–16 (2–9)	13 – Bloodman	5 – Borchert, Ware	2 – Thomas	Humphrey Coliseum (6,007); Starkville, Mississippi
Feb. 16, 2013; 4:00 p.m., ESPNU		at LSU	L 68–80	7–17 (2–10)	25 – Sword	7 – Ware	4 – Sword	Maravich Center (9,720); Baton Rouge, Louisiana
Feb. 20, 2013; 7:00 p.m., SECN/ESPN3		at Alabama	L 56–64	7–18 (2–11)	15 – Steele	9 – Borchert	2 – Thomas, Cunningham	Coleman Coliseum (10,682); Tuscaloosa, Alabama
Feb. 23, 2013; 12:45 p.m., SECN/ESPN3		Vanderbilt	L 31–72	7–19 (2–12)	9 – Steele	3 – Borchert, Thomas	2 – Sword	Humphrey Coliseum (6,442); Starkville, Mississippi
Feb. 27, 2013; 7:00 p.m., SECN/ESPN3		at Kentucky	L 55–85	7–20 (2–13)	13 – Thomas	6 – Ware, Thomas	2 – Sword, Steele	Rupp Arena (24,023); Lexington, Kentucky
Mar. 2, 2013; 4:00 p.m., SECN/ESPN3		Ole Miss	W 73–67	8–20 (3–13)	21 – Borchert	7 – Borchert	9 – Sword	Humphrey Coliseum (8,140); Starkville, Mississippi
Mar. 6, 2013; 6:00 p.m., ESPN3		at South Carolina	L 72–79	8–21 (3–14)	20 – Sword	6 – Cunningham	4 – Thomas, Bloodman	Colonial Life Arena (7,860); Columbia, South Carolina
Mar. 9, 2013; 4:30 p.m., FSN/ESPN3		Auburn	W 74–71 ^{OT}	9–21 (4–14)	20 – Borchert	13 – Borchert	6 – Sword	Humphrey Coliseum (6,250); Starkville, Mississippi
2013 SEC tournament
March 13, 2013; 6:30 pm, SECN/ESPN3		vs. South Carolina; SEC tournament first round	W 70–59	10–21	21 – Thomas	8 – Borchert, Johnson	4 – Sword	Bridgestone Arena (7,879); Nashville, Tennessee
March 14, 2013; 2:38 pm, SECN/ESPN3		vs. Tennessee; Second Round	L 53–69	10–22	19 – Sword	7 – Ware, Bloodman	2 – Borchert, Sword, Johnson	Bridgestone Arena (10,065); Nashville, Tennessee
*Non-Conference Game. Rankings from AP poll. All times are in Central Time. (#) Number seeded with region.
