= 2012–13 South Carolina Gamecocks men's basketball team =

American college basketball season

2012–13 South Carolina Gamecocks men's basketball
- Conference: Southeastern Conference
- Record: 14–18 (4–14 SEC)
- Head coach: Frank Martin (1st season)
- Assistant coaches: Brad Underwood; Matt Figger; Lamont Evans
- Home arena: Colonial Life Arena

2012–13 Southeastern Conference men's basketball standings
| | Conf. | | | | Overall |
| Team | W | | L | PCT | W | | L | PCT |
|---|---|---|---|---|---|---|---|---|
| No. 14 Florida | 14 | – | 4 | .778 | 29 | – | 8 | .784 |
| Ole Miss † | 12 | – | 6 | .667 | 27 | – | 9 | .750 |
| Alabama | 12 | – | 6 | .667 | 23 | – | 13 | .639 |
| Kentucky | 12 | – | 6 | .667 | 21 | – | 12 | .636 |
| Missouri | 11 | – | 7 | .611 | 23 | – | 11 | .676 |
| Tennessee | 11 | – | 7 | .611 | 20 | – | 13 | .606 |
| Arkansas | 10 | – | 8 | .556 | 19 | – | 13 | .594 |
| LSU | 9 | – | 9 | .500 | 19 | – | 12 | .613 |
| Georgia | 9 | – | 9 | .500 | 15 | – | 17 | .469 |
| Vanderbilt | 8 | – | 10 | .444 | 16 | – | 17 | .485 |
| Texas A&M | 7 | – | 11 | .389 | 18 | – | 15 | .545 |
| South Carolina | 4 | – | 14 | .222 | 14 | – | 18 | .438 |
| Mississippi State | 4 | – | 14 | .222 | 10 | – | 22 | .313 |
| Auburn | 3 | – | 15 | .167 | 9 | – | 23 | .281 |
† 2013 SEC tournament winner As of March 31, 2013; Rankings from AP poll

The 2012–13 South Carolina Gamecocks men's basketball team represent the University of South Carolina in the 2012–13 college basketball season. The team's head coach is Frank Martin, who is in his first season at South Carolina. The team plays their home games at the Colonial Life Arena in Columbia, South Carolina as a member of the Southeastern Conference.

== Previous season ==
The Gamecocks posted a record of 10–21 (2-14 SEC) in the 2011–12 season and finished twelfth in the SEC standings. The Gamecocks at the conclusion of the season terminated head coach Darrin Horn after his fourth season as coach. In his place the Gamecocks hired Frank Martin, who had coached the previous five seasons at Kansas State. While at Kansas State, Martin guided the Wildcats to four NCAA Tournament berths including an Elite Eight appearance in 2010.

== Roster ==
2012–13 South Carolina Gamecocks men's basketball team
Players
Coaches

| Pos. | # | Name | Height | Weight | Year | Hometown |
|---|---|---|---|---|---|---|
| G | 1 | Brenton Williams | 5 ft 11 in (1.8 m) | 172 lb (78 kg) | Jr | Kissimmee, Florida |
| G | 2 | Brian Richardson | 6 ft 4 in (1.93 m) | 171 lb (78 kg) | Jr | Wilson, North Carolina |
| G | 5 | Eric Smith | 5 ft 11 in (1.8 m) | 210 lb (95 kg) | Jr | Mullins, South Carolina |
| F | 14 | Laimonas Chatkevicius | 6 ft 11 in (2.11 m) | 255 lb (116 kg) | Fr | Klaipeda, Lithuania |
| G | 23 | Bruce Ellington | 5 ft 9 in (1.75 m) | 197 lb (89 kg) | Jr | Moncks Corner, South Carolina |
| F | 24 | Michael Carrera | 6 ft 5 in (1.96 m) | 212 lb (96 kg) | Fr | Rockville, Maryland |
| F | 25 | Mindaugas Kacinas | 6 ft 7 in (2.01 m) | 210 lb (95 kg) | Fr | Klaipeda, Lithuania |
| F | 30 | Lakeem Jackson | 6 ft 5 in (1.96 m) | 238 lb (108 kg) | Sr | Charlotte, North Carolina |
| G | 32 | Damien Leonard | 6 ft 4 in (1.93 m) | 192 lb (87 kg) | So | Greenville, South Carolina |
| F | 33 | RJ Slawson | 6 ft 8 in (2.03 m) | 207 lb (94 kg) | Jr | Charleston, South Carolina |
| F | 45 | Carlton Geathers | 6 ft 10 in (2.08 m) | 250 lb (113 kg) | RS So | Georgetown, South Carolina |
| G | 55 | Shane Phillips | 5 ft 10 in (1.78 m) | 170 lb (77 kg) | Sr | Wheeling, West Virginia |

Head coach

- Frank Martin (FIU)

Assistant coach(es)

- Brad Underwood (Kansas State)
- Matt Figger (Eastern Kentucky)
- Lamont Evans (Drake)

Legend

- (C) Team captain
- (S) Suspended
- (I) Ineligible
- (W) Walk-on
- Injured
- Current redshirt

Roster
Last update: 2013-01-12

=== Depth chart ===
| Pos. | Starting 5 | Bench 1 | Bench 2 |
|---|---|---|---|
| C | Carlton Geathers | Laimonas Chatkevicius |
| PF | Lakeem Jackson | Mindaugas Kacinas | RJ Slawson |
| SF | Michael Carrera | Brian Richardson |
| SG | Brian Steele | Shane Phillips | Damien Leonard |
| PG | Bruce Ellington | Eric Smith | Brenton Williams |

== Schedule ==
| Date time, TV | Rank^{#} | Opponent^{#} | Result | Record | High points | High rebounds | High assists | Site (attendance) city, state |
Exhibition
| Oct. 30, 2012*; 7:00 pm | | Kentucky Wesleyan | W 68–67 | | 22 – Williams | 10 – Jackson | 3 – Williams | Colonial Life Arena (–); Columbia, SC |
Non-conference regular season
| Nov. 11, 2012*; 3:00 pm, ESPN3 | | Milwaukee | W 82–75 ^{OT} | 1–0 | 19 – Page | 15 – Carrera | 4 – Smith | Colonial Life Arena (7,335); Columbia, SC |
| Nov. 16, 2012*; 7:00 pm | | Morgan State | W 87–71 | 2–0 | 20 – Page | 8 – Jackson | 4 – Jackson | Colonial Life Arena (8,019); Columbia, SC |
| Nov. 19, 2012*; 7:00 pm | | Rider | W 88–76 | 3–0 | 22 – Williams | 7 – Jackson | 6 – Richardson | Colonial Life Arena (7,157); Columbia, SC |
| Nov. 21, 2012*; 7:00 pm | | Elon | L 53–65 | 3–1 | 14 – Jackson | 10 – Jackson | 4 – Richardson | Colonial Life Arena (6,754); Columbia, SC |
| Nov. 24, 2012*; 7:00 pm | | vs. Missouri State; Hoops for Hope Classic | W 74–67 ^{OT} | 4–1 | 22 – Page | 6 – Page | 6 – Smith | TBD (303); Puerto Vallarta, Mexico |
| Nov. 25, 2012*; 9:30 pm | | vs. Arkansas–Little Rock; Hoops for Hope Classic | W 74–62 | 5–1 | 17 – Williams | 15 – Jackson | 5 – Tied | TBD (276); Puerto Vallarta, Mexico |
| Nov. 29, 2012*; 7:30 pm, ESPNU | | at St. John's; SEC–Big East Challenge | L 65–89 | 5–2 | 11 – Carrera | 11 – Carrera | 2 – Tied | Carnesecca Arena (4,902); Queens, New York |
| Dec. 2, 2012*; 12:00 pm, ESPNU | | Clemson | L 55–64 | 5–3 | 16 – Williams | 6 – Tied | 3 – Smith | Colonial Life Arena (10,684); Columbia, SC |
| Dec. 7, 2012*; 7:00 pm | | Jacksonville | W 91–74 | 6–3 | 17 – Carrera | 9 – Carrera | 7 – Smith | Colonial Life Arena (6,980); Columbia, SC |
| Dec. 19, 2012*; 5:00 pm | | Appalachian State | W 74–69 | 7–3 | 16 – Jackson | 12 – Kacinas | 9 – Smith | Colonial Life Arena (N/A); Columbia, SC |
| Dec. 22, 2012*; 5:30 pm | | vs. Manhattan; Brooklyn Hoops Holiday Invitational | W 63–57 | 8–3 | 17 – Williams | 11 – Jackson | 3 – Tied | Barclays Center (N/A); Brooklyn, NY |
| Dec. 29, 2012*; 1:00 pm, ESPN3 | | Presbyterian | W 76–60 | 9–3 | 16 – Richardson | 6 – Tied | 5 – Smith | Colonial Life Arena (7,344); Columbia, SC |
| Jan. 5, 2013*; 1:30 pm, ESPN3 | | South Carolina State | W 80–69 | 10–3 | 16 – Jackson | 10 – Kacinas | 7 – Smith | Colonial Life Arena (7,394); Columbia, SC |
SEC Regular Season
| Jan. 9, 2013; 8:00 pm, ESPN3 | | at Mississippi State | L 54–56 | 10–4 (0–1) | 20 – Richardson | 8 – Richardson | 5 – Smith | Humphrey Coliseum (6,034); Starkville, MS |
| Jan. 12, 2013; 1:45 pm, SECN/ESPN3 | | Auburn | L 71–74 | 10–5 (0–2) | 18 – Ellington | 9 – Leonard | 5 – Tied | Colonial Life Arena (9,117); Columbia, SC |
| Jan. 16, 2013; 8:00 pm, ESPN3 | | at LSU | W 82–73 ^{OT} | 11–5 (1–2) | 23 – Carrera | 11 – Jackson | 4 – Jackson | Maravich Center (6,654); Baton Rouge, LA |
| Jan. 19, 2013; 1:30 pm, SECN/ESPN3 | | Vanderbilt | L 51–58 | 11–6 (1–3) | 16 – Williams | 10 – Jackson | 2 – Ellington, Williams | Colonial Life Arena (11,175); Columbia, SC |
| Jan. 22, 2013; 7:00 pm, ESPNU | | at #22 Missouri | L 65–71 | 11–7 (1–4) | 16 – Williams | 9 – Ellington | 3 – Jackson, Ellington | Mizzou Arena (11,830); Columbia, MO |
| Jan. 26, 2013; 1:30 pm, SECN/ESPN3 | | Arkansas | W 75–54 | 12–7 (2–4) | 20 – Richardson | 7 – Chatkevicius | 4 – Ellington | Colonial Life Arena (10,926); Columbia, SC |
| Jan. 30, 2013; 8:00 pm, SECN/ESPN3 | | at #4 Florida | L 36–75 | 12–8 (2–5) | 13 – Carrera | 9 – Carrera | 3 – Ellington | O'Connell Center (10,533); Gainesville, FL |
| Feb. 2, 2013; 1:45 pm, SECN/ESPN3 | | Georgia | L 56–67 | 12–9 (2–6) | 16 – Carrera | 7 – Carrera | 2 – Jackson, Ellington, Smith | Colonial Life Arena (11,327); Columbia, SC |
| Feb. 5, 2013; 9:00 pm, ESPNU | | at Kentucky | L 55–77 | 12–10 (2–7) | 18 – Carrera | 6 – Carrera, Leonard | 2 – Smith, Leonard | Rupp Arena (22,559); Lexington, KY |
| Feb. 10, 2013; 1:00 pm, FSN/ESPN3 | | Tennessee | L 61–66 | 12–11 (2–8) | 18 – Carrera | 11 – Carrera | 5 – Ellington | Colonial Life Arena (10,101); Columbia, SC |
| Feb. 14, 2013; 7:00 pm, ESPN2 | | LSU | L 46–64 | 12–12 (2–9) | 10 – Jackson | 8 – Carrera | 3 – Jackson | Colonial Life Arena (7,486); Columbia, SC |
| Feb. 16, 2013; 4:00 pm, SECN/ESPN3 | | at Alabama | L 58–68 | 12–13 (2–10) | 14 – Williams | 9 – Jackson | 3 – Ellington | Coleman Coliseum (13,112); Tuscaloosa, AL |
| Feb. 20, 2013; 7:00 pm, CSS/ESPN3 | | Ole Miss | W 63–62 | 13–13 (3–10) | 13 – Carrera | 13 – Carrera | 5 – Smith | Colonial Life Arena (7,721); Columbia, SC |
| Feb. 23, 2013; 2:00 pm, CBS Sports | | at Georgia | L 54–62 ^{OT} | 13–14 (3–11) | 11 – Ellington | 10 – Chatkevicius | 3 – Ellington | Stegeman Coliseum (6,590); Athens, GA |
| Feb. 28, 2013; 9:00 pm, ESPN2 | | Missouri | L 68–90 | 13–15 (3–12) | 20 – Leonard | 4 – Carrera, Kacinas | 4 – Ellington, Smith | Colonial Life Arena (9,360); Columbia, SC |
| Mar. 2, 2013; 7:00 pm, ESPNU | | at Texas A&M | L 56–74 | 13–16 (3–13) | 16 – Carrera | 9 – Carrera | 6 – Ellington | Reed Arena (9,561); College Station, TX |
| Mar. 6, 2013; 7:00 pm, ESPN3 | | Mississippi State | W 79–72 | 14–16 (4–13) | 38 – Williams | 8 – Jackson | 6 – Ellington | Colonial Life Arena (7,860); Columbia, SC |
| Mar. 9, 2013; 1:30 pm, SECN | | at Vanderbilt | L 64–74 | 14–17 (4–14) | 17 – Williams | 13 – Carrera | 4 – Smith | Memorial Gymnasium (10,279); Nashville, TN |
2013 SEC tournament
| March 13, 2013; 7:30 pm, SECN | | vs. Mississippi State; SEC tournament first round | L 59–70 | 14–18 | 13 – Ellington | 7 – Steele | 4 – Williams | Bridgestone Arena (7,879); Nashville, TN |
*Non-Conference Game. Rankings from AP poll. All times are in Eastern Time.
