= 2012–13 Auburn Tigers men's basketball team =

American college basketball season

2012–13 Auburn Tigers men's basketball
- Conference: Southeastern Conference
- Record: 9–23 (3–15 SEC)
- Head coach: Tony Barbee (3rd season)
- Associate head coach: Ryan Miller (1st season)
- Assistant coaches: Tony Madlock; Randall Dickey; Milt Wagner
- Home arena: Auburn Arena

2012–13 Southeastern Conference men's basketball standings
	Conf.				Overall
Team	W		L	PCT	W		L	PCT
No. 14 Florida	14	–	4	.778	29	–	8	.784
Ole Miss †	12	–	6	.667	27	–	9	.750
Alabama	12	–	6	.667	23	–	13	.639
Kentucky	12	–	6	.667	21	–	12	.636
Missouri	11	–	7	.611	23	–	11	.676
Tennessee	11	–	7	.611	20	–	13	.606
Arkansas	10	–	8	.556	19	–	13	.594
LSU	9	–	9	.500	19	–	12	.613
Georgia	9	–	9	.500	15	–	17	.469
Vanderbilt	8	–	10	.444	16	–	17	.485
Texas A&M	7	–	11	.389	18	–	15	.545
South Carolina	4	–	14	.222	14	–	18	.438
Mississippi State	4	–	14	.222	10	–	22	.313
Auburn	3	–	15	.167	9	–	23	.281
† 2013 SEC tournament winner As of March 31, 2013; Rankings from AP poll

The 2012–13 Auburn Tigers men's basketball team represent the University of Auburn in the 2012–13 college basketball season. The team's head coach is Tony Barbee, in his third season at Auburn. The team plays their home games at the Auburn Arena in Auburn, Alabama as a member of the Southeastern Conference.

== Roster ==
2012–13 Auburn Tigers men's basketball team
Players
Coaches

Pos.	#	Name	Height	Weight	Year	Hometown
C	0	Asauhn Dixon-Tatum	7 ft 0 in (2.13 m)	230 lb (104 kg)	Jr	Anderson, Indiana
G	1	KT Harrell (redshirt)	6 ft 4 in (1.93 m)	198 lb (90 kg)	Jr	Montgomery, Alabama
F	2	Allen Payne	6 ft 6 in (1.98 m)	210 lb (95 kg)	Jr	Cincinnati, Ohio
F	3	Chris Denson	6 ft 2 in (1.88 m)	172 lb (78 kg)	Jr	Columbus, Georgia
G	4	Dylan Spencer	6 ft 4 in (1.93 m)	190 lb (86 kg)	Sr	Birmingham, Alabama
G	5	Shaquille Johnson	6 ft 5 in (1.96 m)	210 lb (95 kg)	Fr	Atlanta, Georgia
G	10	Jordan Price	6 ft 5 in (1.96 m)	230 lb (104 kg)	Fr	Decatur, Georgia
G	11	Josh Wallace	5 ft 10 in (1.78 m)	170 lb (77 kg)	Sr	Pensacola, Florida
G	12	Nick Pellar	6 ft 6 in (1.98 m)	200 lb (91 kg)	Fr	Munster, Indiana
F	21	Shareif Adamu	6 ft 8 in (2.03 m)	223 lb (101 kg)	Jr	Brooklyn, New York
G	22	C.J. Holmes	6 ft 0 in (1.83 m)	195 lb (88 kg)	Fr	Washington, DC
G	23	Frankie Sullivan	6 ft 1 in (1.85 m)	206 lb (93 kg)	RS Sr	Uniontown, Alabama
G	24	Brian Greene	6 ft 3 in (1.91 m)	200 lb (91 kg)	Fr	Chicago, Illinois
F	25	Jordon Granger	6 ft 8 in (2.03 m)	205 lb (93 kg)	Fr	St. Louis, Missouri
G	32	Noel Johnson	6 ft 6 in (1.98 m)	200 lb (91 kg)	Sr	Fayetteville, Georgia
C	41	Rob Chubb	6 ft 10 in (2.08 m)	242 lb (110 kg)	Sr	Peachtree City, Georgia

Head coach

- Tony Barbee (UMass)

Assistant coach(es)

- Ryan Miller (Northern State)
- Tony Madlock (Memphis)
- Milt Wagner (Louisville)

Legend

- (C) Team captain
- (S) Suspended
- (I) Ineligible
- (W) Walk-on
- Injured
- Current redshirt

Roster
Last update: 2011-12-16

== Schedule and results ==
Date time, TV	Rank^{#}	Opponent^{#}	Result	Record	High points	High rebounds	High assists	Site (attendance) city, state
Exhibition
Oct. 30, 2012*; 7:00 pm		Victory	W 108–57	–	19 – Chubb	11 – Chubb	4 – Greene Jr.	Auburn Arena (2,500); Auburn, AL
Nov. 5, 2012*; 7:00 pm		Georgia Southwestern	W 66–50	–	11 – Dixon-Tatum	9 – Dixon-Tatum	5 – Wallace	Auburn Arena (2,500); Auburn, AL
Non-conference regular season
Nov. 9, 2012*; 7:00 pm		IPFW	W 61–50	1–0	26 – Sullivan	15 – Chubb	3 – Tied	Auburn Arena (4,578); Auburn, AL
Nov. 15, 2012*; 7:00 pm, ESPN3		vs. Murray State; Charleston Classic	L 59–79	1–1	12 – Tied	9 – Johnson	3 – Johnson	Carolina First Arena (4,716); Charleston, SC
Nov. 16, 2012; 6:30 pm, ESPN3		at Coll. of Charleston; Charleston Classic	W 55–51	2–1	24 – Sullivan	5 – Tied	2 – Tied	Carolina First Arena (4,780); Charleston, SC
Nov. 18, 2012*; 1:00 pm, ESPN3		vs. Dayton; Charleston Classic	L 63–73	2–2	23 – Sullivan	5 – Tied	5 – Sullivan	Carolina First Arena (4,262); Charleston, SC
Nov. 21, 2012*; 3:00 pm, ESPNU		at Boston College	L 49-50	2-3	23 – Sullivan	8 – Sullivan	2 – Greene Jr.	Conte Forum (3,102); Chestnut Hill, MA
Nov. 25, 2012*; 4:00 pm		Rhode Island	L 72–78 ^{2OT}	2-4	19 – Price	9 – Chubb	7 – Wallace	Auburn Arena (4,557); Auburn, AL
Nov. 30, 2012*; 8:00 pm, ESPNU		DePaul; SEC–Big East Challenge	L 76–80	2-5	28 – Sullivan	13 – Chubb	5 – Sullivan	Auburn Arena (5,827); Auburn, AL
Dec. 11, 2012*; 7:00 pm		Grambling State	W 92–42	3-5	14 – Tied	7 – Payne	5 – Tied	Auburn Arena (4,314); Auburn, AL
Dec. 15, 2012*; 7:00 pm		Furman	W 64–50	4-5	17 – Denson	9 – Dixon-Tatum	7 – Sullivan	Auburn Arena (4,820); Auburn, AL
Dec. 18, 2012*; 7:00 pm		Tennessee Tech	W 81–62	5-5	20 – Denson	8 – Dixon-Tatum	7 – Wallace	Auburn Arena (4,323); Auburn, AL
Dec. 22, 2012*; 7:00 pm		Winthrop	L 67–74	5-6	22 – Sullivan	6 – Sullivan	5 – Sullivan	Auburn Arena (5,156); Auburn, AL
Dec. 29, 2012*; 1:15 pm, ESPNU		vs. No. 12 Illinois	L 79-81	5-7	21 – Sullivan	10 – Payne	4 – Tied	United Center (18,136); Chicago, IL
Jan. 2, 2013*; 6:00 pm, ESPN2		Florida State	W 78-72	6-7	24 – Sullivan	10 – Chubb	6 – Wallace	Auburn Arena (6,496); Auburn, AL
SEC Regular Season
Jan. 9, 2013; 8:00 pm, ESPN		LSU	W 68–63	7–7 (1–0)	15 – Payne	9 – Johnson	4 – Payne	Auburn Arena (6,355); Auburn, AL
Jan. 12, 2013; 12:45 pm, SECN/ESPN3		at South Carolina	W 74–71	8–7 (2–0)	17 – Sullivan	10 – Chubb	7 – Wallace	Colonial Life Arena (9,117); Columbia, SC
Jan. 16, 2013; 7:00 pm, SECN/ESPN3		at Arkansas	L 80–88 ^{2OT}	8–8 (1–2)	26 – Sullivan	11 – Chubb	9 – Wallace	Bud Walton Arena (13,404); Fayetteville, AR
Jan. 19, 2013; 8:00 pm, SECN/ESPN3		Kentucky	L 53-75	8–9 (2–2)	14 – Chubb	7 – Chubb	3 – Tied	Auburn Arena (9,121); Auburn, AL
Jan. 23, 2013; 7:00 pm, ESPN3		at Vanderbilt	L 61–73	8–10 (2–3)	14 – Chubb, Sullivan	8 – Chubb	4 – Johnson	Memorial Gymnasium (9,961); Nashville, TN
Jan. 26, 2013; 7:00 pm, FSN/ESPN3		No. 23 Ole Miss	L 61–63	8–11 (2–4)	18 – Denson	10 – Chubb	3 – Chubb	Auburn Arena (8,740); Auburn, AL
Jan. 30, 2013; 6:00 pm, ESPN2		at Georgia	L 49–57	8–12 (2–5)	13 – Payne, Sullivan	6 – Chubb	4 – Sullivan	Stegeman Coliseum (4,767); Athens, GA
Feb. 2, 2013; 12:45 pm, SECN/ESPN3		at No. 17 Missouri	L 77–91	8–13 (2–6)	12 – Sullivan	5 – Price	3 – Greene Jr.	Mizzou Arena (12,313); Columbia, MO
Feb. 6, 2013; 7:00 pm, ESPN		Alabama	W 49–37	9–13 (3–6)	11 – Payne, Wallace	7 – Chubb	2 – Wallace, Sullivan	Auburn Arena (7,502); Auburn, AL
Feb. 9, 2013; 3:00 pm, SECN/ESPN3		at Kentucky	L 62-72	9–14 (3–7)	15 – Denson	7 – Sullivan	4 – Wallace	Rupp Arena (24,253); Lexington, KY
Feb. 13, 2013; 8:00 pm, ESPN2		Arkansas	L 75–83	9–15 (3–8)	18 – Denson	8 – Chubb	5 – Denson	Auburn Arena (5,783); Auburn, AL
Feb. 16, 2013; 12:45 pm, SECN/ESPN3		No. 7 Florida	L 52–83	9–16 (3–9)	13 – Denson	7 – Payne	3 – Johnson	Auburn Arena (8,953); Auburn, AL
Feb. 20, 2013; 7:00 pm, ESPNU		Texas A&M	L 56–65	9–17 (3–10)	11 – Payne	6 – Johnson	6 – Sullivan	Auburn Arena (5,322); Auburn, AL
Feb. 23, 2013; 4:00 pm, FSN/ESPN3		at Ole Miss	L 55–88	9–18 (3-11)	18 – Johnson	7 – Payne	3 – Sullivan	Tad Smith Coliseum (7,275); Oxford, MS
Feb. 26, 2013; 6:00 pm, CBS		at Alabama	L 43–61	9–19 (3–12)	13 – Chubb	6 – Payne	4 – Payne	Coleman Coliseum (12,633); Tuscaloosa, AL
Mar. 2, 2013; 8:00 pm, ESPN2		Vanderbilt	L 55-62	9–20 (3–13)	16 – Denson	6 – Payne, Chubb	3 – Sullivan	Auburn Arena (7,295); Auburn, AL
Mar. 6, 2013; 8:00 pm, CSS/ESPN3		Tennessee	L 75–82	9–21 (3–14)	24 – Sullivan	7 – Chubb	4 – Wallace	Auburn Arena (5,420); Auburn, AL
Mar. 9, 2013; 4:30 pm, ESPN		at Mississippi State	L 71–74 ^{OT}	9–22 (3–15)	24 – Denson	9 – Denson	4 – Sullivan	Humphrey Coliseum (6,250); Starkville, MS
2013 SEC tournament
March 13, 2013; 9:00 pm, SECN/ESPN3		vs. Texas A&M; SEC tournament first round	L 62–71	9–23	19 – Sullivan	6 – Dixon-Tatum	4 – Wallace	Bridgestone Arena (7,879); Nashville, TN
*Non-Conference Game. Rankings from AP poll. All times are in Central Time.
