= 2012–13 Georgia Bulldogs basketball team =

American college basketball season

2012–13 Georgia Bulldogs men's basketball
- Conference: Southeastern Conference
- Record: 15–17 (9–9 SEC)
- Head coach: Mark Fox (4th season)
- Assistant coaches: Kwanza Johnson; Stacey Palmore; Philip Pearson
- Home arena: Stegeman Coliseum

2012–13 Southeastern Conference men's basketball standings
	Conf.				Overall
Team	W		L	PCT	W		L	PCT
No. 14 Florida	14	–	4	.778	29	–	8	.784
Ole Miss †	12	–	6	.667	27	–	9	.750
Alabama	12	–	6	.667	23	–	13	.639
Kentucky	12	–	6	.667	21	–	12	.636
Missouri	11	–	7	.611	23	–	11	.676
Tennessee	11	–	7	.611	20	–	13	.606
Arkansas	10	–	8	.556	19	–	13	.594
LSU	9	–	9	.500	19	–	12	.613
Georgia	9	–	9	.500	15	–	17	.469
Vanderbilt	8	–	10	.444	16	–	17	.485
Texas A&M	7	–	11	.389	18	–	15	.545
South Carolina	4	–	14	.222	14	–	18	.438
Mississippi State	4	–	14	.222	10	–	22	.313
Auburn	3	–	15	.167	9	–	23	.281
† 2013 SEC tournament winner As of March 31, 2013; Rankings from AP poll

The 2012–13 Georgia Bulldogs basketball team represented the University of Georgia during the 2012–2013 college basketball season. The team's head coach was Mark Fox, who was in his fourth season at UGA. They played their home games at Stegeman Coliseum as members of the Southeastern Conference.

== Previous season ==
After reaching the NCAA tournament, the Bulldogs struggled in 2011–12 by finishing the season 15–17 overall, 5–11 in conference which was good for eleventh in the SEC.

== Roster ==
2012–13 Georgia Bulldogs men's basketball team
Players
Coaches

Pos.	#	Name	Height	Weight	Year	Hometown
G	1	Kentavious Caldwell-Pope	6 ft 5 in (1.96 m)	200 lb (91 kg)	So	Greenville, Georgia
F	2	Marcus Thornton	6 ft 7 in (2.01 m)	235 lb (107 kg)	Jr	Atlanta
G	4	Charles Mann	6 ft 4 in (1.93 m)	205 lb (93 kg)	Fr	Alpharetta, Georgia
F	5	Tim Dixon	6 ft 9 in (2.06 m)	225 lb (102 kg)	So	Columbus, Georgia
G	11	Vincent Williams	6 ft 1 in (1.85 m)	160 lb (73 kg)	Sr	Homestead, Florida
G	12	Kenny Gaines	6 ft 3 in (1.91 m)	195 lb (88 kg)	Fr	Atlanta
F	15	Donte' Williams	6 ft 9 in (2.06 m)	220 lb (100 kg)	Jr	Lithonia, Georgia
G	23	Sherrard Brantley	6 ft 2 in (1.88 m)	180 lb (82 kg)	Sr	Dublin, Georgia
F	24	Houston Kessler	6 ft 8 in (2.03 m)	215 lb (98 kg)	Fr	Newnan, Georgia
F	31	Brandon Morris	6 ft 7 in (2.01 m)	205 lb (93 kg)	Fr	Lithonia, Georgia
F	32	John Florveus	6 ft 11 in (2.11 m)	230 lb (104 kg)	Sr	Miami, Florida
C	41	John Cannon	6 ft 10 in (2.08 m)	245 lb (111 kg)	So	Burnsville, North Carolina
F	42	Nemanja Djurisic	6 ft 8 in (2.03 m)	230 lb (104 kg)	So	Podgorica, Montenegro

Head coach

- Mark Fox (Eastern New Mexico)

Assistant coach(es)

- Kwanza Johnson (Tulsa)
- Stacey Palmore (Livingstone College)
- Philip Pearson (Alabama)

Legend

- (C) Team captain
- (S) Suspended
- (I) Ineligible
- (W) Walk-on
- Injured
- Current redshirt

Roster
Last update: 2012-09-15

== Schedule ==
Date time, TV	Rank^{#}	Opponent^{#}	Result	Record	High points	High rebounds	High assists	Site (attendance) city, state
Exhibition
Nov. 2, 2012*; 7:00 pm		Young Harris	W 86–52	–	– – –	– – –	– – –	Stegeman Coliseum (–); Athens, Georgia
Non-conference regular season
Nov. 9, 2012*; 7:00 pm		Jacksonville	W 68–62	1–0	17 – Caldwell-Pope	12 – Djurisic	6 – Williams	Stegeman Coliseum (5,232); Athens, Georgia
Nov. 12, 2012*; 7:00 pm, ESPNU		Youngstown State; Legends Classic	L 56–68	1–1	27 – Caldwell-Pope	6 – Caldwell-Pope	3 – Brantley	Stegeman Coliseum (4,275); Athens, Georgia
Nov. 15, 2012*; 8:00 pm, FSN/ESPN3		Southern Miss; Legends Classic	L 60–62 ^{OT}	1–2	17 – Caldwell-Pope	7 – Thornton	5 – Caldwell-Pope	Stegeman Coliseum (4,521); Athens, Georgia
Nov. 19, 2012*; 5:30 pm, ESPNU		vs. No. 1 Indiana; Legends Classic	L 53–66	1–3	14 – Tied	7 – Djurisic	2 – Tied	Barclays Center (N/A); Brooklyn, New York
Nov. 20, 2012*; 7:30 pm, ESPNU		vs. No. 11 UCLA; Legends Classic	L 56–60	1–4	16 – Caldwell-Pope	10 – Thornton	4 – Mann	Barclays Center (10,478); Brooklyn, New York
Nov. 23, 2012*; 7:00 pm		East Tennessee State	W 54–38	2–4	13 – Caldwell-Pope	7 – Caldwell-Pope	5 – Djurisic	Stegeman Coliseum (4,869); Athens, Georgia
Nov. 30, 2012*; 7:00 pm, ESPNU		at South Florida; SEC–Big East Challenge	L 53–64	2–5	19 – Caldwell-Pope	5 – Tied	4 – Djurisic	USF Sun Dome (5,167); Tampa, Florida
Dec. 4, 2012*; 7:00 pm, ESPNU		at Georgia Tech; Clean, Old-Fashioned Hate	L 54–62	2–6	16 – Caldwell-Pope	13 – Caldwell-Pope	2 – Tied	McCamish Pavilion (8,600); Atlanta
Dec. 15, 2012*; 5:00 pm		Iona	L 78–81 ^{OT}	2–7	18 – Tied	10 – Tied	3 – Tied	Stegeman Coliseum (4,680); Athens, Georgia
Dec. 18, 2012*; 11:30 am		Mercer	W 58–49	3–7	17 – Caldwell-Pope	9 – Caldwell-Pope	5 – Mann	Stegeman Coliseum (8,650); Athens, Georgia
Dec. 22, 2012*; 1:30 pm, FSN/ESPN3		USC	W 64–56	4–7	25 – Caldwell-Pope	7 – Cannon	6 – Mann	Stegeman Coliseum (6,227); Athens, Georgia
Dec. 29, 2012*; 4:00 pm, ESPN3		Florida A&M	W 82–73	5–7	21 – Djurisc	9 – Caldwell-Pope	4 – Williams	Stegeman Coliseum (6,149); Athens, Georgia
Jan. 4, 2013*; 7:00 pm, CSS/ESPN3		George Washington	W 52–41	6–7	17 – Tied	10 – Florveus	3 – Tied	Stegeman Coliseum (4,885); Athens, Georgia
SEC Regular Season
Jan. 9, 2013; 7:00 pm, CSS/ESPN3		at #11 Florida	L 44–77	6–8 (0–1)	11 – Caldwell-Pope	4 – Morris	2 – Mann	O'Connell Center (11,366); Gainesville, Florida
Jan. 12, 2013; 1:45 pm, SECN/ESPN3		Mississippi State	L 61–72	6–9 (0–2)	16 – Caldwell-Pope	8 – Williams	4 – Mann	Stegeman Coliseum (5,891); Athens, Georgia
Jan. 16, 2013; 8:00 pm, SECN/ESPN3		at #17 Missouri	L 62–79	6–10 (0–3)	23 – Williams	5 – Djurisic	3 – Caldwell-Pope, Williams	Mizzou Arena (12,797); Columbia, Missouri
Jan. 19, 2013; 8:00 pm, CSS/ESPN3		LSU	W 67–58	7–10 (1–3)	22 – Caldwell-Pope	8 – Djurisic	5 – Caldwell-Pope, Mann	Stegeman Coliseum (5,779); Athens, Georgia
Jan. 23, 2013; 8:00 pm, SECN/ESPN3		#8 Florida	L 47–64	7–11 (1–4)	16 – Caldwell-Pope	7 – Caldwell-Pope	3 – Mann	Stegeman Coliseum (6,793); Athens, Georgia
Jan. 26, 2013; 6:00 pm, FSN/ESPN3		at Texas A&M	W 59–52	8–11 (2–4)	22 – Caldwell-Pope	9 – Caldwell-Pope	4 – Mann	Reed Arena (7,595); College Station, Texas
Jan. 30, 2013; 7:00 pm		Auburn	W 57–49	9–11 (3–4)	20 – Caldwell-Pope	10 – Caldwell-Pope	6 – Mann	Stegeman Coliseum (4,767); Athens, Georgia
Feb. 2, 2013; 1:45 pm, SECN/ESPN3		at South Carolina	W 67–56	10–11 (4–4)	19 – Caldwell-Pope	7 – Caldwell-Pope	6 – Mann	Colonial Life Arena (11,327); Columbia, South Carolina
Feb. 6, 2013; 8:00 pm, SECN/ESPN3		at Tennessee	W 68–62	11–11 (5–4)	24 – Caldwell-Pope	4 – Williams	3 – Caldwell-Pope	Thompson–Boling Arena (14,876); Knoxville, Tennessee
Feb. 9, 2013; 5:00 pm, ESPNU		Texas A&M	W 52–46	12–11 (6–4)	13 – Djurisic	8 – Florveus	3 – Morris	Stegeman Coliseum (7,380); Athens, Georgia
Feb. 12, 2013; 9:00 pm, ESPNU		Alabama	L 45–52	12–12 (6–5)	22 – Caldwell-Pope	8 – Caldwell-Pope, Mann	3 – Williams	Stegeman Coliseum (5,385); Athens, Georgia
Feb. 16, 2013; 8:00 pm, ESPN2		at Ole Miss	L 74–84 ^{OT}	12–13 (6–6)	19 – Caldwell-Pope	12 – Caldwell-Pope	7 – Williams	Tad Smith Coliseum (8,255); Oxford, Mississippi
Feb. 21, 2013; 7:00 pm, ESPN2		at Arkansas	L 60–62	12–14 (6–7)	15 – Caldwell-Pope	7 – D. Williams	5 – V. Williams	Bud Walton Arena (13,443); Fayetteville, Arkansas
Feb. 23, 2013; 2:00 pm, CBS		South Carolina	W 62–54 ^{OT}	13–14 (7–7)	18 – Caldwell-Pope	11 – Morris	4 – Caldwell-Pope	Stegeman Coliseum (6,590); Athens, Georgia
Feb. 27, 2013; 9:00 pm, FSN/ESPN3		at Vanderbilt	L 62–63	13–15 (7–8)	20 – Caldwell-Pope	14 – Caldwell-Pope	3 – Brantley	Memorial Gymnasium (10,211); Nashville, Tennessee
Mar. 2, 2013; 1:45 pm, SECN/ESPN3		Tennessee	W 78–68	14–15 (8–8)	25 – Caldwell-Pope	9 – Caldwell-Pope	8 – Mann	Stegeman Coliseum (9,436); Athens, Georgia
Mar. 7, 2013; 7:00 pm, ESPN		Kentucky	W 72–62	15–15 (9–8)	24 – Caldwell-Pope	10 – Caldwell-Pope	4 – Mann	Stegeman Coliseum (10,062); Athens, Georgia
Mar. 9, 2013; 4:00 pm, SECN/ESPN3		at Alabama	L 58–61	15–16 (9–9)	14 – Caldwell-Pope, Djurisic	6 – Djurisic	3 – Caldwell-Pope	Coleman Coliseum (13,166); Tuscaloosa, Alabama
2013 SEC tournament
Mar. 14, 2013; 1:00 pm, SECN/ABC/ESPN3		vs. LSU; Second Round	L 63–68	15–17	32 – Caldwell-Pope	13 – Caldwell-Pope	5 – Mann	Bridgestone Arena (10,065); Nashville, Tennessee
*Non-Conference Game. Rankings from AP poll. All times are in Eastern Time. (#) Number seeded with region.
