= 2012–13 LSU Tigers basketball team =

American college basketball season

2012–13 LSU Tigers men's basketball
- Conference: Southeastern Conference
- Record: 19–12 (9–9 SEC)
- Head coach: Johnny Jones (1st season)
- Assistant coaches: Robert Kirby; Charlie Leonard; David Patrick
- Home arena: Pete Maravich Assembly Center

2012–13 Southeastern Conference men's basketball standings
	Conf.				Overall
Team	W		L	PCT	W		L	PCT
No. 14 Florida	14	–	4	.778	29	–	8	.784
Ole Miss †	12	–	6	.667	27	–	9	.750
Alabama	12	–	6	.667	23	–	13	.639
Kentucky	12	–	6	.667	21	–	12	.636
Missouri	11	–	7	.611	23	–	11	.676
Tennessee	11	–	7	.611	20	–	13	.606
Arkansas	10	–	8	.556	19	–	13	.594
LSU	9	–	9	.500	19	–	12	.613
Georgia	9	–	9	.500	15	–	17	.469
Vanderbilt	8	–	10	.444	16	–	17	.485
Texas A&M	7	–	11	.389	18	–	15	.545
South Carolina	4	–	14	.222	14	–	18	.438
Mississippi State	4	–	14	.222	10	–	22	.313
Auburn	3	–	15	.167	9	–	23	.281
† 2013 SEC tournament winner As of March 31, 2013; Rankings from AP poll

The 2012–13 LSU Tigers basketball team represented Louisiana State University during the 2012–2013 college basketball season. The team's head coach is Johnny Jones, who was in his first season at LSU. Jones previously served as the head coach at the University of North Texas. Jones played in the 1981 Final Four as a freshman at Louisiana State University, and later served 12 seasons as an assistant coach at LSU under Dale Brown where the pair returned the 1986 Final Four. They played their home games at Pete Maravich Assembly Center as members of the Southeastern Conference.

== Previous season ==
The Tigers completed the 2011–2012 season with an overall record of 18–15 and a 7–9 record in conference play. After falling to the eventual national champions, the Kentucky Wildcats, in the second round of the SEC tournament, LSU received a bid to the NIT tournament, where they were defeated by the Oregon Ducks in the first round. LSU lost several major contributors at the end of the season, including 2nd team All-SEC center Justin Hamilton, who was selected 45th overall in the 2012 NBA draft by the Philadelphia 76ers.

In April 2012, it was announced that after four seasons as head coach, Trent Johnson would be leaving LSU to become the head basketball coach at TCU. Shortly after, LSU announced that it had hired Johnny Jones as its new head coach. Jones played at LSU for four seasons from 1980 to 1984, including an appearance in the 1981 NCAA Final Four. He followed his playing career by serving as an assistant coach under Dale Brown from 1984 to 1997. Prior to becoming the head coach at LSU, Jones had spent the previous eleven seasons as the head coach at the University of North Texas, where he accumulated a record of 190–146 and earned two NCAA tournament bids.

=== Departures ===
Name	Number	Pos.	Height	Weight	Year	Hometown	Notes
Chris Bass	4	G	6'1"	190	Senior	Baton Rouge, Louisiana	Graduated
Malcolm White	5	F	6'9"	220	Senior	Baton Rouge, Louisiana	Graduated
Ronald Martin	12	G	6'1"	182	Freshman	White Castle, Louisiana	Left to focus on LSU football team
Ralston Turner	22	G	6'6"	205	Sophomore	Muscle Shoals, Alabama	Transferred to North Carolina State University
Storm Warren	24	F	6'7"	230	Senior	Monroe, Louisiana	Graduated
John Isaac	32	G	6'3"	208	Freshman	Leesville, Louisiana	Transferred to Baton Rouge Community College
Justin Hamilton	41	C	7'0"	260	Junior	Alpine, Utah	2nd round draft pick (#45) by the Philadelphia 76ers

=== Class of 2012 signees ===
College recruiting information
Name	Hometown	School	Height	Weight	Commit date
Shavon Coleman; F	Thibodaux, Louisiana	Howard College	6 ft 6 in (1.98 m)	193 lb (88 kg)	Apr 24, 2012
Shavon Coleman; F	Recruit ratings: Scout: Rivals: (N/A)				
Corban Collins; G	High Point, North Carolina	Massanutten Military Academy	6 ft 3 in (1.91 m)	193 lb (88 kg)	Jun 14, 2012
Corban Collins; G	Recruit ratings: Scout: Rivals: (62)				
Shane Hammink; F	Millingen aan de Rijn, Netherlands	Canarias Basketball Academy	6 ft 5 in (1.96 m)	200 lb (91 kg)	Apr 24, 2012
Shane Hammink; F	Recruit ratings: Scout: Rivals: (82)				
Malik Morgan; G	River Ridge, Louisiana	John Curtis Christian High School	6 ft 3 in (1.91 m)	180 lb (82 kg)	Aug 10, 2011
Malik Morgan; G	Recruit ratings: Scout: Rivals: (88)				
Overall recruit ranking: Scout: N/R Rivals: N/R ESPN: N/R
Note: In many cases, Scout, Rivals, 247Sports, On3, and ESPN may conflict in their listings of height and weight.; In these cases, the average was taken. ESPN grades are on a 100-point scale.; Sources: "LSU Basketball Commitments". Rivals.; "2012 LSU Basketball Commits". Scout.; "ESPN". ESPN.; "Scout.com Team Recruiting Rankings". Scout.; "2012 Team Ranking". Rivals.

== Roster ==
2012–13 LSU Tigers men's basketball team
Players
Coaches

Pos.	#	Name	Height	Weight	Year	Hometown
G	0	Charles Carmouche	6 ft 4 in (1.93 m)	187 lb (85 kg)	RS Sr	New Orleans, Louisiana
G	1	Anthony Hickey	5 ft 11 in (1.8 m)	182 lb (83 kg)	So	Hopkinsville, Kentucky
F	2	Johnny O'Bryant III	6 ft 9 in (2.06 m)	262 lb (119 kg)	So	Cleveland, Mississippi
F	3	Jalen Courtney	6 ft 8 in (2.03 m)	228 lb (103 kg)	Jr	Jackson, Mississippi
G	4	Corban Collins	6 ft 3 in (1.91 m)	190 lb (86 kg)	Fr	High Point, North Carolina
F	5	Shavon Coleman	6 ft 6 in (1.98 m)	200 lb (91 kg)	Jr	Thibodaux, Louisiana
G	10	Andre Stringer	5 ft 9 in (1.75 m)	180 lb (82 kg)	Jr	Jackson, Mississippi
F	11	Shane Hammink	6 ft 6 in (1.98 m)	190 lb (86 kg)	Fr	Millingen aan de Rijn, Netherlands
F	13	Eddie Ludwig	6 ft 9 in (2.06 m)	210 lb (95 kg)	Sr	Metairie, Louisiana
G	24	Malik Morgan	6 ft 4 in (1.93 m)	180 lb (82 kg)	Fr	River Ridge, Louisiana
G	45	Mychal Williams	6 ft 3 in (1.91 m)	207 lb (94 kg)	RS Jr	Bossier City, Louisiana
G	51	Joshua Badeaux	6 ft 1 in (1.85 m)	195 lb (88 kg)	RS So	Galliano, Louisiana
C	55	Andrew Del Piero	7 ft 3 in (2.21 m)	254 lb (115 kg)	Sr	Austin, Texas

Head coach

- Johnny Jones (LSU)

Assistant coach(es)

- Robert Kirby (Texas–Pan American)
- Charlie Leonard (Christian Brothers)
- David Patrick (Louisiana)

Legend

- (C) Team captain
- (S) Suspended
- (I) Ineligible
- (W) Walk-on
- Injured
- Current redshirt

Roster
Last update: 2013-03-07

=== Depth chart ===
Pos.	Starting 5	Bench 1	Bench 2	Bench 3
C	Andrew Del Piero
PF	Johnny O'Bryant III	Jalen Courtney
SF	Shavon Coleman	Shane Hammink	Eddie Ludwig
SG	Andre Stringer	Malik Morgan	Mychal Williams	Joshua Badeaux
PG	Anthony Hickey	Charles Carmouche	Corban Collins

== Schedule ==
Date time, TV	Rank^{#}	Opponent^{#}	Result	Record	High points	High rebounds	High assists	Site (attendance) city, state
Non-conference regular season
Nov. 9, 2012*; 7:00 pm		UC Santa Barbara	W 77–63	1–0	16 – Carmouche	8 – O'Bryant III	6 – Hickey	Maravich Center (6,966); Baton Rouge, LA
Nov. 13, 2012*; 7:00 pm, CST		McNeese State	W 73–48	2–0	25 – Coleman	10 – Coleman	6 – Hickey	Maravich Center (6,776); Baton Rouge, LA
Nov. 20, 2012*; 7:00 pm, CST		Northwestern State	W 102–95	3–0	22 – Coleman	7 – Ludwig, Hickey, Coleman	6 – Hickey	Maravich Center (7,018); Baton Rouge, LA
Nov. 24, 2012*; 7:00 pm, CST/ESPN3		Mississippi Valley St.	W 75–50	4–0	16 – Coleman	11 – Coleman	6 – Hickey	Maravich Center (6,237); Baton Rouge, LA
Nov. 29, 2012*; 8:30 pm, ESPNU		Seton Hall; SEC–Big East Challenge	W 72–67	5–0	18 – Coleman	11 – O'Bryant III	7 – Carmouche	Maravich Center (7,295); Baton Rouge, LA
Dec. 11, 2012*; 7:00 pm, CST		Chattanooga	W 80–37	6–0	18 – O'Bryant III, Stringer	10 – O'Bryant III	4 – Stringer, Hammink	Maravich Center (6,760); Baton Rouge, LA
Dec. 14, 2012*; 8:00 pm		at Boise State	L 70–89	6–1	19 – Collins	7 – Coleman	5 – Carmouche	Taco Bell Arena (11,210); Boise, ID
Dec. 18, 2012*; 9:00 pm		at UC Irvine	W 66–60	7–1	19 – Stringer	13 – O'Bryant III	3 – Carmouche	Bren Events Center (1,536); Irvine, CA
Dec. 22, 2012*; 1:00 pm, ESPNU		at Marquette	L 80–84	7–2	20 – Stringer	7 – Hickey	10 – Carmouche	BMO Harris Bradley Center (14,309); Milwaukee, WI
Dec. 28, 2012*; 7:00 pm, CST		Houston Baptist	W 75–58	8–2	11 – Stringer, Coleman	13 – Coleman	5 – Collins	Maravich Center (7,032); Baton Rouge, LA
Jan. 5, 2013*; 12:30 pm		Bethune-Cookman	W 79–63	9–2	17 – Carmouche	12 – Coleman	5 – Carmouche	Maravich Center (6,462); Baton Rouge, LA
SEC Regular Season
Jan. 9, 2013; 8:00 pm, CST/CSS/ESPN3		at Auburn	L 63–68	9–3 (0–1)	15 – Carmouche	9 – Coleman	7 – Carmouche	Auburn Arena (6,355); Auburn, AL
Jan. 12, 2013; 3:00 pm, ESPNU		No. 11 Florida	L 52–74	9–4 (0–2)	15 – Hickey	6 – Carmouche	4 – Hickey	Maravich Center (9,964); Baton Rouge, LA
Jan. 16, 2013; 7:00 pm, ESPN3		South Carolina	L 73–82 ^{OT}	9–5 (0–3)	18 – Hickey	7 – Hickey, Coleman	5 – Carmouche	Maravich Center (6,654); Baton Rouge, LA
Jan. 19, 2013; 7:00 pm, CST/CSS/ESPN3		at Georgia	L 58–67	9–6 (0–4)	16 – O'Bryant III	14 – O'Bryant III	2 – O'Bryant III, Hickey	Stegeman Coliseum (5,779); Athens, GA
Jan. 23, 2013; 7:00 pm, SECN/ESPN3		Texas A&M	W 58–54	10–6 (1–4)	17 – Coleman	10 – O'Bryant III	3 – Carmouche	Maravich Center (7,064); Baton Rouge, LA
Jan. 26, 2013; 3:00 pm, SECN/ESPN3		at Kentucky	L 70–75	10–7 (1–5)	21 – O'Bryant III	12 – O'Bryant III	7 – Carmouche	Rupp Arena (24,248); Lexington, KY
Jan. 30, 2013; 7:00 pm, SECN/ESPN3		#17 Missouri	W 73–70	11–7 (2–5)	20 – Hickey	11 – O'Bryant III	4 – Hickey	Maravich Center (8,804); Baton Rouge, LA
Feb. 2, 2013; 4:30 pm, FSN/ESPN3		at Mississippi State	W 69–68	12–7 (3–5)	12 – O'Bryant III, Hickey	12 – O'Bryant III	4 – Hickey	Humphrey Coliseum (7,667); Starkville, MS
Feb. 6, 2013; 7:00 pm, ESPN3		Vanderbilt	W 57–56	13–7 (4–5)	14 – Hickey	7 – Hickey	5 – Hickey	Maravich Center (7,075); Baton Rouge, LA
Feb. 9, 2013; 7:00 pm, ESPN2		at Alabama	L 57–60	13–8 (4–6)	22 – O'Bryant III	11 – O'Bryant III	4 – Hickey	Coleman Coliseum (13,511); Tuscaloosa, AL
Feb. 14, 2013; 6:00 pm, ESPN2		at South Carolina	W 64–46	14–8 (5–6)	30 – O'Bryant III	10 – O'Bryant III	8 – Carmouche	Colonial Life Arena (7,486); Columbia, SC
Feb. 16, 2013; 4:00 pm, ESPNU		Mississippi State	W 80–68	15–8 (6–6)	21 – Carmouche	11 – O'Bryant III	8 – O'Bryant III	Maravich Center (9,720); Baton Rouge, LA
Feb. 19, 2013; 6:00 pm, ESPNU		at Tennessee	L 72–82	15–9 (6–7)	24 – O'Bryant III	8 – O'Bryant III	4 – Hickey	Thompson–Boling Arena (15,086); Knoxville, TN
Feb. 23, 2013; 12:45 pm, SECN/ESPN3		Alabama	W 97–94 ^{3OT}	16–9 (7–7)	24 – O'Bryant III	11 – Carmouche	7 – Hickey	Maravich Center (8,200); Baton Rouge, LA
Feb. 27, 2013; 7:00 pm, SECN/ESPN3		Arkansas	W 65–60	17–9 (8–7)	26 – Carmouche	8 – O'Bryant III	5 – Hickey	Maravich Center (7,891); Baton Rouge, LA
Mar. 2, 2013; 3:00 pm, SECN/ESPN3		at Missouri	L 76–89	17–10 (8–8)	22 – Hickey	8 – O'Bryant III	5 – Carmouche	Mizzou Arena (14,212); Columbia, MO
Mar. 6, 2013; 7:00 pm, SECN/ESPN3		at Texas A&M	W 68–57	18–10 (9–8)	20 – Carmouche	10 – O'Bryant III	5 – Carmouche	Reed Arena (6,540); College Station, TX
Mar. 9, 2013; 12:30 pm, SECN/ESPN3		Ole Miss	L 67–81	18–11 (9–9)	18 – Stringer	12 – O'Bryant III	4 – Carmouche	Maravich Center (10,187); Baton Rouge, LA
2013 SEC tournament
Mar. 14, 2013; 12:00 pm, SECN		vs. Georgia; Second Round	W 68–63	19–11	24 – Coleman	12 – O'Bryant III	5 – Hickey	Bridgestone Arena (10,065); Nashville, TN
March 15, 2013; 12:00 pm, ESPNU		vs. No. 13 Florida; Quarterfinals	L 58–80	19–12	14 – Carmouche	6 – Del Piero	3 – Carmouche	Bridgestone Arena (15,649); Nashville, TN
*Non-Conference Game. Rankings from AP poll. All times are in Central Time.
