= 2012–13 Texas A&M Aggies men's basketball team =

American college basketball season

2012–13 Texas A&M Aggies men's basketball
- Conference: Southeastern Conference
- Record: 18–15 (7–11 SEC)
- Head coach: Billy Kennedy (2nd season)
- Assistant coaches: Glynn Cyprien; Kyle Keller; Glenn Reese
- Home arena: Reed Arena

2012–13 Southeastern Conference men's basketball standings
	Conf.				Overall
Team	W		L	PCT	W		L	PCT
No. 14 Florida	14	–	4	.778	29	–	8	.784
Ole Miss †	12	–	6	.667	27	–	9	.750
Alabama	12	–	6	.667	23	–	13	.639
Kentucky	12	–	6	.667	21	–	12	.636
Missouri	11	–	7	.611	23	–	11	.676
Tennessee	11	–	7	.611	20	–	13	.606
Arkansas	10	–	8	.556	19	–	13	.594
LSU	9	–	9	.500	19	–	12	.613
Georgia	9	–	9	.500	15	–	17	.469
Vanderbilt	8	–	10	.444	16	–	17	.485
Texas A&M	7	–	11	.389	18	–	15	.545
South Carolina	4	–	14	.222	14	–	18	.438
Mississippi State	4	–	14	.222	10	–	22	.313
Auburn	3	–	15	.167	9	–	23	.281
† 2013 SEC tournament winner As of March 31, 2013; Rankings from AP poll

The 2012–13 Texas A&M Aggies men's basketball team represented the Texas A&M University in the 2012–13 college basketball season. The team's head coach was Billy Kennedy, who was in his second season at Texas A&M. The team played their home games at the Reed Arena in College Station, Texas and played in its first season as a member of the Southeastern Conference. On 21 December 2012, Forward Keith Davis left the team.

== Previous season ==
The Aggies posted a record of 14–18 (4-14 Big XII) in the 2011–12 season and finished ninth in their last full season as a member of the Big XII. The season was particularly troubling for Head Coach Kennedy, who was diagnosed prior to the beginning of the season with Parkinson's Disease. The Aggies missed the NCAA Tournament for the first time in six seasons.

== Roster ==
2012–13 Texas A&M Aggies men's basketball team
Players
Coaches

Pos.	#	Name	Height	Weight	Year	Hometown
C	0	Andrew Young	6 ft 8 in (2.03 m)	241 lb (109 kg)	Jr	Monterey, California
G	2	Shawn Smith	6 ft 4 in (1.93 m)	185 lb (84 kg)	Fr	Jacksonville, Florida
F	3	Antwan Space (redshirt)	6 ft 8 in (2.03 m)	232 lb (105 kg)	So	Desoto, Texas
C	4	Keith Davis	6 ft 10 in (2.08 m)	232 lb (105 kg)	Jr	Dallas, Texas
G	11	J'Mychal Reese	6 ft 1 in (1.85 m)	173 lb (78 kg)	Fr	Bryan, Texas
G	12	Fabyon Harris	5 ft 11 in (1.8 m)	172 lb (78 kg)	Jr	Chicago, Illinois
G	13	Jordan Green	6 ft 4 in (1.93 m)	183 lb (83 kg)	So	Flower Mound, Texas
G	15	Kyle Dobbins	6 ft 0 in (1.83 m)	174 lb (79 kg)	Fr	Houston, Texas
F	20	Daniel Alexander	6 ft 9 in (2.06 m)	215 lb (98 kg)	RS So	Dripping Springs, Texas
G	21	Alex Caruso	6 ft 5 in (1.96 m)	176 lb (80 kg)	Fr	College Station, Texas
G	31	Elston Turner	6 ft 5 in (1.96 m)	220 lb (100 kg)	RS Sr	Missouri City, Texas
F	32	Kourtney Roberson	6 ft 9 in (2.06 m)	240 lb (109 kg)	RS So	Arcadia, Louisiana
F	33	Grant Jolly	6 ft 7 in (2.01 m)	210 lb (95 kg)	So	Southlake, Texas
F	35	Ray Turner	6 ft 9 in (2.06 m)	230 lb (104 kg)	Sr	Houston, Texas
F	42	Jarod Jahns	6 ft 6 in (1.98 m)	195 lb (88 kg)	RS Sr	Spring, Texas

Head coach

- Billy Kennedy (Southeastern Louisiana)

Assistant coach(es)

- Glynn Cyprien
- Kyle Keller
- John Reese

Legend

- (C) Team captain
- (S) Suspended
- (I) Ineligible
- (W) Walk-on
- Injured
- Current redshirt

Roster
Last update: 2012-10-02

== Schedule ==
Date time, TV	Rank^{#}	Opponent^{#}	Result	Record	High points	High rebounds	High assists	Site (attendance) city, state
Exhibition
Nov. 3, 2012*; 7:00 pm		Incarnate Word	W 97–83		28 – Harris	13 – Roberson	5 – Turner	Reed Arena (3,924); College Station, TX
Non-conference regular season
Nov. 9, 2012*; 7:00 pm, FSSW		Louisiana Tech; CBE Hall of Fame Classic	W 71–59	1–0	15 – Turner	8 – Young	4 – Harris	Reed Arena (5,066); College Station, TX
Nov. 12, 2012*; 7:00 pm, FSSW		Troy; CBE Hall of Fame Classic	W 83–65	2–0	26 – Turner	6 – Tied	6 – Reese	Reed Arena (4,330); College Station, TX
Nov. 15, 2012*; 7:00 pm, FSSW		Prairie View A&M	W 81–59	3–0	18 – Harris	9 – Turner	6 – Green	Reed Arena (4,201); College Station, TX
Nov. 19, 2012*; 6:30 pm, ESPNU		vs. St. Louis; CBE Hall of Fame Classic	L 49–70	3–1	16 – Turner	5 – Tied	4 – Reese	Sprint Center (N/A); Kansas City, MO
Nov. 20, 2012*; 6:00 pm, ESPN3		vs. Washington State; CBE Hall of Fame Classic	W 55–54	4–1	14 – Turner	12 – Roberson	5 – E. Turner	Sprint Center (10,315); Kansas City, MO
Nov. 26, 2012*; 7:00 pm, FSSW		Northwestern State	W 78–65	5–1	17 – E. Turner	10 – Roberson	6 – Caruso	Reed Arena (4,289); College Station, TX
Dec. 1, 2012*; 7:00 pm, FSN		at Houston	W 70–59	6–1	26 – E. Turner	11 – R. Turner	7 – Caruso	Hofheinz Pavilion (6,423); Houston, TX
Dec. 5, 2012*; 7:00 pm, FSSW		Stephen F. Austin	W 62–54	7–1	15 – Tied	8 – Turner	4 – Reese	Reed Arena (4,684); College Station, TX
Dec. 15, 2012*; 1:00 pm, ESPNU		vs. Oklahoma; All-College Basketball Classic	L 54–64	7–2	17 – Turner	10 – Young	6 – Caruso	Chesapeake Energy Arena (3,444); Oklahoma City, OK
Dec. 18, 2012*; 6:00 pm, FSSW		Texas A&M–Corpus Christi	W 66–54	8–2	17 – Harris	9 – Turner	6 – Tied	Reed Arena (4,648); College Station, TX
Dec. 22, 2012*; 3:00 pm, FSSW		Southern	L 51–53	8–3	14 – Tied	8 – Turner	3 – Tied	Reed Arena (5,325); College Station, TX
Dec. 29, 2012*; 4:00 pm, FSSW		Army	W 61–55	9–3	12 – Harris	8 – Tied	5 – Turner	Reed Arena (6,416); College Station, TX
Jan. 3, 2013*; 5:30 pm, FSSW		Houston Baptist	W 67–59	10–3	17 – E. Turner	7 – R. Turner	4 – E. Turner	Reed Arena (5,463); College Station, TX
SEC Regular Season
Jan. 9, 2013; 8:00 pm, ESPNU		Arkansas	W 69–51	11–3 (1–0)	17 – Harris	12 – Roberson	3 – Reese	Reed Arena (5,539); College Station, TX
Jan. 12, 2013; 3:00 pm, SECN/ESPN3		at Kentucky	W 83–71	12–3 (2–0)	40 – Turner	9 – Roberson	4 – Tied	Rupp Arena (24,193); Lexington, KY
Jan. 17, 2013; 6:00 pm, ESPN2		No. 10 Florida	L 47–68	12–4 (2–1)	12 – Caruso	8 – Turner	3 – Caruso	Reed Arena (11,046); College Station, TX
Jan. 19, 2013; 5:00 pm, SEC Regional/ESPN3		at Alabama	L 49–50	12–5 (2–2)	13 – Turner	8 – Roberson	2 – Roberson, Caruso	Coleman Coliseum (13,741); Tuscaloosa, AL
Jan. 23, 2013; 7:00 pm, SECN/ESPN3		at LSU	L 54–58	12–6 (2–3)	19 – Harris	7 – Reese, Young	3 – Caruso	Maravich Center (7,064); Baton Rouge, LA
Jan. 26, 2013; 5:00 pm, SEC Regional/ESPN3		Georgia	L 52–59	12–7 (2–4)	19 – Turner	6 – Roberson, Caruso	3 – Turner	Reed Arena (7,595); College Station, TX
Jan. 30, 2013; 8:00 pm, CSS/ESPN3		at Mississippi State	W 55–49 ^{OT}	13–7 (3–4)	17 – Harris	12 – Roberson	3 – Caruso	Humphrey Coliseum (6,858); Starkville, MS
Feb. 2, 2013; 5:00 pm, ESPN		Kentucky	L 68–72 ^{OT}	13–8 (3–5)	21 – E. Turner	11 – R. Turner	4 – Reese	Reed Arena (10,558); College Station, TX
Feb. 7, 2013; 8:00 pm, ESPN2		#21 Missouri	W 70–68	14–8 (4–5)	17 – Harris	6 – Roberson	6 – Caruso	Reed Arena (5,484); College Station, TX
Feb. 9, 2013; 4:00 pm, ESPNU		at Georgia	L 46–52	14–9 (4–6)	17 – Harris	12 – Roberson	2 – Roberson	Stegeman Coliseum (7,380); Athens, GA
Feb. 13, 2013; 6:00 pm, CSS/ESPN3		Ole Miss	W 69–67	15–9 (5–6)	37 – E. Turner	13 – R. Turner	6 – Caruso	Reed Arena (5,377); College Station, TX
Feb. 16, 2013; 5:30 pm, SEC Regional/ESPN3		at Vanderbilt	L 56–63	15–10 (5–7)	14 – Turner	8 – Roberson	4 – Caruso	Memorial Gymnasium (11,269); Nashville, TN
Feb. 20, 2013; 7:00 pm, ESPN3		at Auburn	W 65–56	16–10 (6–7)	21 – Turner	10 – Roberson	8 – Caruso	Auburn Arena (5,322); Auburn, AL
Feb. 23, 2013; 3:00 pm, SECN/ESPN3		Tennessee	L 85–93 ^{4OT}	16–11 (6–8)	38 – E. Turner	8 – R. Turner	4 – Caruso	Reed Arena (7,828); College Station, TX
Feb. 27, 2013; 8:00 pm, CSS/ESPN3		at Ole Miss	L 73–82	16–12 (6–9)	25 – Turner	10 – Roberson	8 – Caruso	Tad Smith Coliseum (6,526); Oxford, MS
Mar. 2, 2013; 6:00 pm, ESPNU		South Carolina	W 74–56	17–12 (7–9)	28 – E. Turner	6 – R. Turner	5 – E. Turner	Reed Arena (9,561); College Station, TX
Mar. 6, 2013; 7:00 pm, SECN/ESPN3		LSU	L 57–68	17–13 (7–10)	16 – R. Turner	13 – R. Turner	3 – E. Turner	Reed Arena (6,540); College Station, TX
Mar. 9, 2013; 1:00 pm, ESPNU		at Arkansas	L 62–73	17–14 (7–11)	16 – Harris	7 – Turner	5 – Caruso	Bud Walton Arena (15,423); Fayetteville, AR
2013 SEC tournament
Mar. 13, 2013; 9:00 pm, SECN/ESPN3		vs. Auburn; SEC tournament first round	W 71–62	18–14	22 – Turner	7 – Roberson	6 – Caruso	Bridgestone Arena (7,879); Nashville, TN
March 14, 2013; 9:20 pm, SECN/ESPN3		vs. Missouri; Second Round	L 50–62	18–15	15 – Harris	6 – Roberson	1 – Roberson, Harris, Turner, Green	Bridgestone Arena (11,798); Nashville, TN
*Non-Conference Game. Rankings from AP poll. All times are in Central Time.
