= 2012–13 Tennessee Volunteers basketball team =

American college basketball season

2012–13 Tennessee Volunteers men's basketball

NIT, first round
- Conference: Southeastern Conference
- Record: 20–13 (11–7 SEC)
- Head coach: Cuonzo Martin (2nd season)
- Assistant coaches: Tracy Webster; Jon Harris; Kent Williams
- Home arena: Thompson-Boling Arena

2012–13 Southeastern Conference men's basketball standings
	Conf.				Overall
Team	W		L	PCT	W		L	PCT
No. 14 Florida	14	–	4	.778	29	–	8	.784
Ole Miss †	12	–	6	.667	27	–	9	.750
Alabama	12	–	6	.667	23	–	13	.639
Kentucky	12	–	6	.667	21	–	12	.636
Missouri	11	–	7	.611	23	–	11	.676
Tennessee	11	–	7	.611	20	–	13	.606
Arkansas	10	–	8	.556	19	–	13	.594
LSU	9	–	9	.500	19	–	12	.613
Georgia	9	–	9	.500	15	–	17	.469
Vanderbilt	8	–	10	.444	16	–	17	.485
Texas A&M	7	–	11	.389	18	–	15	.545
South Carolina	4	–	14	.222	14	–	18	.438
Mississippi State	4	–	14	.222	10	–	22	.313
Auburn	3	–	15	.167	9	–	23	.281
† 2013 SEC tournament winner As of March 31, 2013; Rankings from AP poll

The 2012–13 Tennessee Volunteers men's basketball team represented the University of Tennessee in the 2012–13 college basketball season. The team was led by head coach Cuonzo Martin, who was in his second season at Tennessee. They played their home games at Thompson-Boling Arena in Knoxville, Tennessee as a member of the Southeastern Conference.

== Previous season ==
The Volunteers posted a record of 19–15 (10-6 SEC) in the 2011–12 season and finished second in the SEC standings in Cuonzo Martin's first season as head coach. The season was highlighted by a sweep of Florida and a victory over perennial power Connecticut. The Volunteers a streak of five consecutive NCAA Tournament appearances come to an end by appearing in the 2012 National Invitation Tournament. The Volunteers lost in the first round of the NIT to Middle Tennessee State by a score of 71–64.

== Roster ==
2012–13 Tennessee Volunteers men's basketball team
Players
Coaches

Pos.	#	Name	Height	Weight	Year	Hometown
F	0	Yemi Makanjuola	6 ft 9 in (2.06 m)	250 lb (113 kg)	So	Lagos, Nigeria
G	1	Josh Richardson	6 ft 6 in (1.98 m)	188 lb (85 kg)	So	Edmond, Oklahoma
G	3	Derek Reese	6 ft 8 in (2.03 m)	208 lb (94 kg)	Fr	Orlando, Florida
G	4	Armani Moore	6 ft 5 in (1.96 m)	203 lb (92 kg)	Fr	Kennesaw, Georgia
F	5	Jarnell Stokes	6 ft 8 in (2.03 m)	250 lb (113 kg)	So	Memphis, Tennessee
G	11	Trae Golden	6 ft 1 in (1.85 m)	209 lb (95 kg)	Jr	Powder Springs, Georgia
G	13	Skylar McBee	6 ft 3 in (1.91 m)	184 lb (83 kg)	Sr	Rutledge, Tennessee
F	15	Rob Murphy	6 ft 7 in (2.01 m)	232 lb (105 kg)	RS Sr	Brentwood, Tennessee
F	20	Kenny Hall	6 ft 9 in (2.06 m)	222 lb (101 kg)	Sr	Stone Mountain, Georgia
G	24	Brandon Lopez	6 ft 1 in (1.85 m)	179 lb (81 kg)	So	Knoxville, Tennessee
F	25	Dwight Miller	6 ft 8 in (2.03 m)	240 lb (109 kg)	RS Sr	Nassau, Bahamas
G	31	Quinton Chievous	6 ft 5 in (1.96 m)	201 lb (91 kg)	RS Fr	Chicago, Illinois
G	32	D'Montre Edwards	6 ft 6 in (1.98 m)	206 lb (93 kg)	Fr	Charleston, South Carolina
F	34	Jeronne Maymon	6 ft 7 in (2.01 m)	265 lb (120 kg)	RS Sr	Madison, Wisconsin
G	52	Jordan McRae	6 ft 5 in (1.96 m)	174 lb (79 kg)	Jr	Midway, Georgia

Head coach

- Cuonzo Martin (Purdue)

Assistant coach(es)

- Tracy Webster (Wisconsin)
- Jon Harris (Marquette)
- Kent Williams (Southern Illinois)

Legend

- (C) Team captain
- (S) Suspended
- (I) Ineligible
- (W) Walk-on
- Injured
- Current redshirt

Roster
Last update: 2012-09-24

== Schedule ==
Date time, TV	Rank^{#}	Opponent^{#}	Result	Record	High points	High rebounds	High assists	Site (attendance) city, state
Exhibition
Nov. 5, 2012*; 7:00 pm		Victory	W 99–57	0–0	15 – Tied	9 – Chievous	8 – Golden	Thompson-Boling Arena (14,788); Knoxville, TN
Non-conference regular season
Nov. 9, 2012*; 7:00 pm		Kennesaw State	W 76–67	1–0	14 – Tied	6 – Hall	6 – Golden	Thompson-Boling Arena (18,044); Knoxville, TN
Nov. 15, 2012*; 12:30 pm, ESPNU		vs. UNC Asheville; Puerto Rico Tip-Off quarterfinals	W 75–68	2–0	14 – Tied	11 – Stokes	5 – Golden	Coliseo Rubén Rodríguez (N/A); Bayamón, PR
Nov. 16, 2012*; 10:30 am, ESPNU		vs. Oklahoma State; Puerto Rico Tip-Off	L 45–62	2–1	11 – Golden	5 – Tied	2 – Tied	Coliseo Rubén Rodríguez (N/A); Bayamón, PR
Nov. 18, 2012*; 4:00 pm, ESPNU		vs. Massachusetts; Puerto Rico Tip-Off	W 83–69	3–1	24 – Stokes	12 – Stokes	6 – Golden	Coliseo Rubén Rodríguez (N/A); Bayamón, PR
Nov. 26, 2012*; 7:00 pm, FS South/ESPN3		Oakland	W 77–50	4–1	19 – Stokes	11 – Hall	7 – Golden	Thompson-Boling Arena (14,625); Knoxville, TN
Nov. 30, 2012*; 6:30 pm, ESPN		at No. 20 Georgetown; SEC–Big East Challenge	L 36–37	4–2	8 – Tied	9 – Stokes	4 – Golden	Verizon Center (13,656); Washington D.C.
Dec. 5, 2012*; 7:00 pm, ESPN3		at Virginia	L 38–46	4–3	11 – Golden	9 – Stokes	3 – McRae	John Paul Jones Arena (9,702); Charlottesville, VA
Dec. 13, 2012*; 7:00 pm, FS South		No. 23 Wichita State	W 69–60	5–3	25 – Golden	8 – Makanjuola	5 – Golden	Thompson-Boling Arena (15,215); Knoxville, TN
Dec. 18, 2012*; 7:00 pm, SportSouth		Presbyterian	W 78–62	6–3	18 – Stokes	8 – McRae	8 – Golden	Thompson-Boling Arena (14,495); Knoxville, TN
Dec. 21, 2012*; 7:00 pm, FS South/ESPN3		Western Carolina	W 66–52	7–3	14 – McRae	13 – Hall	4 – Golden	Thompson-Boling Arena (15,109); Knoxville, TN
Dec. 29, 2012*; 6:00 pm, ESPNU		Xavier	W 51–47	8–3	12 – Richardson	8 – Makanjuola	2 – McRae	Thompson-Boling Arena (18,504); Knoxville, TN
Jan. 4, 2013*; 8:00 pm, ESPN2		Memphis	L 80–85	8–4	26 – McRae	11 – Hall	4 – McRae	Thompson-Boling Arena (19,535); Knoxville, TN
SEC Regular Season
Jan. 9, 2013; 8:00 pm, SEC Network/ESPN3		Ole Miss	L 74–92	8–5 (0–1)	26 – McRae	11 – Stokes	5 – Golden	Thompson-Boling Arena (17,059); Knoxville, TN
Jan. 12, 2013; 1:00 pm, ESPN2		at Alabama	L 65–68	8–6 (0–2)	21 – McRae	8 – Hall	2 – McRae	Coleman Coliseum (12,093); Tuscaloosa, AL
Jan. 15, 2013; 7:00 pm, ESPN		at Kentucky	L 65–75	8–7 (0–3)	23 – McRae	5 – Stokes	6 – Golden	Rupp Arena (24,033); Lexington, KY
Jan. 19, 2013; 4:00 pm, SEC Network/ESPN3		Mississippi State	W 72–57	9–7 (1–3)	18 – Stokes	11 – Stokes, Moore	9 – Golden	Thompson-Boling Arena (17,584); Knoxville, TN
Jan. 24, 2013; 7:00 pm, ESPN2		at #23 Ole Miss	L 56–62	9–8 (1–4)	26 – McRae	8 – Moore	3 – Richardson, Moore	Tad Smith Coliseum (9,206); Oxford, MS
Jan. 26, 2013; 2:00 pm, ESPN2		Alabama	W 54–53	10–8 (2–4)	17 – McRae	18 – Stokes	4 – McRae	Thompson-Boling Arena (18,791); Knoxville, TN
Jan. 29, 2013; 7:00 pm, ESPNU		Vanderbilt	W 58–57	11–8 (3–4)	19 – Stokes	11 – Stokes	3 – Stokes, Lopez	Thompson-Boling Arena (16,391); Knoxville, TN
Feb. 2, 2013; 4:00 pm, ESPN/ESPN2		at Arkansas	L 60–73	11–9 (3–5)	18 – Stokes	10 – Stokes	2 – Stokes, Richardson, McBee	Bud Walton Arena (14,746); Fayetteville, AR
Feb. 6, 2013; 8:00 pm, SEC Network/ESPN3		Georgia	L 62–68	11–10 (3–6)	17 – McRae	11 – Stokes	3 – Richardson	Thompson-Boling Arena (14,876); Knoxville, TN
Feb. 10, 2013; 1:00 pm, FS South/ESPN3		at South Carolina	W 66–61	12–10 (4–6)	20 – Stokes	10 – Stokes	5 – Richardson	Colonial Life Arena (10,101); Columbia, SC
Feb. 13, 2013; 8:00 pm, SEC Network/ESPN3		at Vanderbilt	W 58–46	13–10 (5–6)	17 – Stokes	11 – McRae	3 – Golden, Richardson	Memorial Gymnasium (12,868); Nashville, TN
Feb. 16, 2013; 1:00 pm, CBS		#25 Kentucky	W 88–58	14–10 (6–6)	24 – Golden	9 – Stokes	8 – Golden	Thompson-Boling Arena (21,678); Knoxville, TN
Feb. 19, 2013; 7:00 pm, ESPNU		LSU	W 82–72	15–10 (7–6)	34 – McRae	11 – Stokes	8 – Golden	Thompson-Boling Arena (15,086); Knoxville, TN
Feb. 23, 2013; 4:00 pm, SEC Network/ESPN3		at Texas A&M	W 93–85 ^{4OT}	16–10 (8–6)	32 – Golden	16 – Stokes	4 – Golden, McRae, Richardson	Reed Arena (7,828); College Station, TX
Feb. 26, 2013; 9:00 pm, ESPN		#8 Florida	W 64–58	17–10 (9–6)	27 – McRae	14 – Stokes	4 – McRae	Thompson-Boling Arena (19,567); Knoxville, TN
Mar. 2, 2013; 1:45 pm, SEC Network/ESPN3		at Georgia	L 68–78	17–11 (9–7)	35 – McRae	10 – Stokes	4 – Golden	Stegeman Coliseum (9,436); Athens, GA
Mar. 6, 2013; 9:00 pm, CSS/ESPN3		at Auburn	W 82–75	18–11 (10–7)	21 – Golden, McRae	12 – Stokes	6 – Golden	Auburn Arena (5,420); Auburn, AL
Mar. 9, 2013; 4:00 pm, ESPN		Missouri	W 64–62	19–11 (11–7)	15 – McRae	13 – Stokes	4 – Golden	Thompson-Boling Arena (21,767); Knoxville, TN
2013 SEC tournament
Mar. 14, 2013; 3:38 pm, SEC Network/ESPN3		vs. Mississippi State; Second Round	W 69–53	20–11	17 – McRae	9 – Stokes	4 – Richardson	Bridgestone Arena (10,065); Nashville, TN
Mar. 15, 2013; 3:30 pm, SEC Network/ESPNU		vs. Alabama; Quarterfinals	L 48–58	20–12	16 – Richardson	13 – Stokes	5 – Golden	Bridgestone Arena (15,649); Nashville, TN
2013 NIT
March 20, 2013*; 8:00 pm, ESPNU	No. (2)	No. (7) Mercer; First Round	L 67–75	20–13	20 – Golden	13 – Stokes	4 – McRae	Thompson-Boling Arena (4,468); Knoxville, TN
*Non-Conference Game. Rankings from AP poll. All times are in Eastern Time
