= 2013 SEC men's basketball tournament =

- Classification: Division I
- Season: 2012–13
- Teams: 14
- Site: Bridgestone Arena; Nashville, Tennessee
- Champions: Ole Miss (2nd title)
- Winning coach: Andy Kennedy (1st title)
- MVP: Marshall Henderson (Ole Miss)
- Television: SEC Network, ESPNU, ABC

2012–13 Southeastern Conference men's basketball standings
	Conf.				Overall
Team	W		L	PCT	W		L	PCT
No. 14 Florida	14	–	4	.778	29	–	8	.784
Ole Miss †	12	–	6	.667	27	–	9	.750
Alabama	12	–	6	.667	23	–	13	.639
Kentucky	12	–	6	.667	21	–	12	.636
Missouri	11	–	7	.611	23	–	11	.676
Tennessee	11	–	7	.611	20	–	13	.606
Arkansas	10	–	8	.556	19	–	13	.594
LSU	9	–	9	.500	19	–	12	.613
Georgia	9	–	9	.500	15	–	17	.469
Vanderbilt	8	–	10	.444	16	–	17	.485
Texas A&M	7	–	11	.389	18	–	15	.545
South Carolina	4	–	14	.222	14	–	18	.438
Mississippi State	4	–	14	.222	10	–	22	.313
Auburn	3	–	15	.167	9	–	23	.281
† 2013 SEC tournament winner As of March 31, 2013; Rankings from AP poll

The 2013 SEC men's basketball tournament was the postseason men's basketball tournament for the Southeastern Conference held from March 13–17, 2013 in Nashville, Tennessee at Bridgestone Arena. The first round and quarterfinal rounds were televised through the SEC Network and ESPNU, and the semifinals and finals were broadcast nationally on ABC.

== Format ==
With the addition of Missouri and Texas A&M to the league, the tournament expanded to 14 teams. As in previous years, the top four teams received byes to the quarterfinals; these byes now became double-byes with the addition of a new round featuring the four lowest seeds (11 through 14; seeds 5 through 10 receive a single bye into the second round). After these matchups on the first day, the rest of the tournament proceeds as in previous years, with the 11/14 and 12/13 winners facing, respectively, seeds 6 and 5, and seeds 7 & 10 and 8 & 9 also squaring off in the second round. The four winners on the second day join the top four seeds in the quarterfinals.

== Seeds ==
2013 SEC men's basketball tournament seeds and results
Seed	School	Conf.	Over.	Tiebreaker
1.	‡Florida	14–4	26–7	
2.	†Kentucky	12–6	21–11	1–1 vs ALA, MISS; 1–1 vs FLA
3.	†Ole Miss	12–6	26–8	1–1 vs ALA, KEN; 0–1 vs FLA; 2–0 vs TENN
4.	†Alabama	12–6	21–12	1–1 vs KEN, MISS; 0–1 vs FLA; 1–1 vs TENN
5.	#Tennessee	11–7	20–12	1–0 vs MIZZ
6.	#Missouri	11–7	23–10	0–1 vs TENN
7.	#Arkansas	10–8	19–13	
8.	#Georgia	9–9	15–17	1–0 vs LSU
9.	#LSU	9–9	19–12	0–1 vs UGA
10.	#Vanderbilt	8–10	16–17	
11.	Texas A&M	7–11	18–15	
12.	South Carolina	4–14	14–18	1–1 vs MSST, 1–0 vs MISS
13.	Mississippi State	4–14	10–22	1–1 vs SCAR, 1–1 vs MISS
14.	Auburn	3–15	9–23	
‡ – SEC regular season champions, and tournament No. 1 seed. † – Received a double-bye in the conference tournament. # – Received a single-bye in the conference tournament. Overall records include all games played in the SEC Tournament.

== Schedule ==
Session	Game	Time*	Matchup^{#}	Television	Attendance
First Round – Wednesday, March 13
1	1	6:30 PM	#13 Mississippi State vs. #12 South Carolina	SEC Network	7,879
1	2	9:00 PM	#14 Auburn vs. #11 Texas A&M	SEC Network	7,879
Second Round – Thursday, March 14
2	3	12:00 PM	#9 LSU vs. #8 Georgia	SEC Network	10,065
2	4	2:30 PM	#13 Mississippi State vs. #5 Tennessee	SEC Network	10,065
3	5	6:30 PM	#10 Vanderbilt vs. #7 Arkansas	SEC Network	11,798
3	6	9:00 PM	#11 Texas A&M vs. #6 Missouri	SEC Network	11,798
Quarterfinals – Friday, March 15
4	7	12:00 PM	#9 LSU vs. #1 Florida	ESPNU	15,649
4	8	2:30 PM	#5 Tennessee vs. #4 Alabama	ESPNU	15,649
5	9	6:30 PM	#10 Vanderbilt vs. #2 Kentucky	SEC Network; ESPNU (select markets)	18,192
5	10	9:00 PM	#6 Missouri vs. #3 Ole Miss	SEC Network; ESPNU (select markets)	18,192
Semifinals – Saturday, March 16
6	11	12:00 PM	#4 Alabama vs #1 Florida	ABC	14,574
6	12	2:30 PM	#10 Vanderbilt vs. #3 Ole Miss	ABC	14,574
Championship Game – Sunday, March 17
7	13	12:00 PM	#1 Florida vs. #3 Ole Miss	ABC	12,138
*Game Times in CT. #-Rankings denote tournament seed

== Bracket ==
First round Wednesday, March 13; SEC Network
12	South Carolina	59
13	Mississippi State	70
11	Texas A&M	71
14	Auburn	62

Second round Thursday, March 14; SEC Network
8	Georgia	63
9	LSU	68
5	Tennessee	69
13	Mississippi State	53
7	Arkansas	72
10	Vanderbilt	75
6	Missouri	62
11	Texas A&M	50

Quarterfinals; Friday, March 15; ESPNU/SEC Network
1	#13 Florida	80
9	LSU	58
4	Alabama	58
5	Tennessee	48
2	Kentucky	48
10	Vanderbilt	64
3	Ole Miss	64
6	Missouri	62

Semifinals; Saturday, March 16; ABC
1	#13 Florida	61
4	Alabama	51
10	Vanderbilt	52
3	Ole Miss	64

Championship Game; Sunday, March 17; ABC
1	#13 Florida	63
3	Ole Miss	66

^{OT} denotes overtime game

== SEC All-tournament team ==
- Marshall Henderson, Ole Miss MVP
- Erik Murphy, Florida
- Kenny Boynton, Florida
- Reginald Buckner, Ole Miss
- Murphy Holloway, Ole Miss
