= Rick Ray (basketball) =

American basketball coach (born 1970)

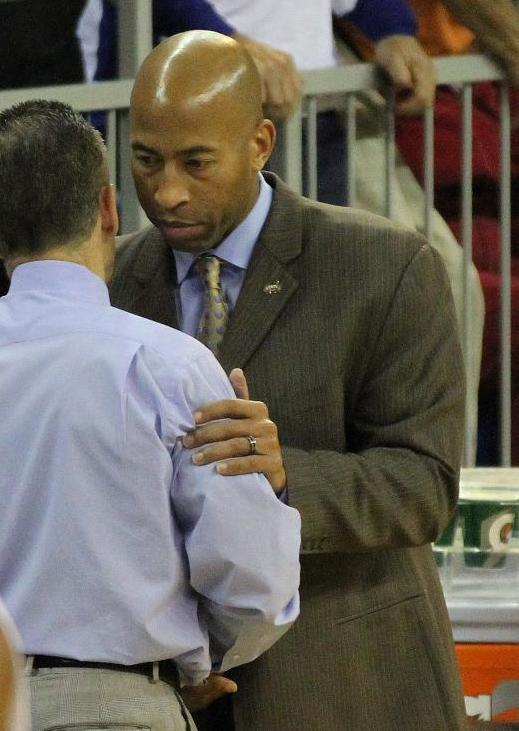

Current position
- Title: Assistant coach
- Team: Vanderbilt
- Conference: Southeastern Conference

Biographical details
- Born: May 8, 1970 (age 56); Compton, California, U.S.

Playing career
- ?–1994: Grand View

Coaching career (HC unless noted)
- 1996–1997: Omaha (GA)
- 1997–2004: Indiana State (assistant)
- 2004–2006: Northern Illinois (assistant)
- 2006–2010: Purdue (assistant)
- 2010–2012: Clemson (assistant)
- 2012–2015: Mississippi State
- 2015–2020: Southeast Missouri State
- 2020–2024: Colorado (assistant)
- 2024–present: Vanderbilt (assistant)

Head coaching record
- Overall: 88–164

Rick Ray (born May 8, 1970) is an American college basketball coach who is an assistant coach at Vanderbilt University. He was formerly the head men's basketball coach at Mississippi State and Southeast Missouri State.

== Biography ==
Ray was born in Compton, California; however, his family moved to Kansas City, Kansas when Ray was 6 years old. He is an All-American Scholar Athlete basketball player who played at Grand View College, where he majored in Applied Mathematics and Secondary Education. After graduation, Ray worked as an actuary in Chicago, but soon realized that he wanted to be a basketball coach. He quit his actuary job and became a coach and teacher at a high school in Des Moines, Iowa. After 1 1/2 years, he left to become a graduate assistant coach at Nebraska-Omaha. While at Nebraska-Omaha, he also earned a master's degree in Sports Administration. From there, Ray was an assistant coach at Indiana State, Northern Illinois, Purdue, and Clemson, before being hired by Mississippi State.

Upon hiring Ray, Mississippi State Athletics Director Scott Stricklin said, “Rick fits the model of head coach we have sought to bring into our program over the last several years. He is bright, enthusiastic, disciplined and is a man of integrity. He has served with some of the top head and assistant coaches in college basketball and will bring a piece of all of them to our head coaching position.”

On March 21, 2015 Ray was fired by Mississippi State. He was subsequently hired by Southeast Missouri State. After finishing the 2019–20 season with a 7–24 record, Ray was let go by Southeast Missouri State.

On July 20, 2020, Ray was hired by Colorado as an assistant coach. He helped lead the Buffaloes to two NCAA tournament bids in 2021 and 2024. Ray left Colorado following the conclusion of the 2023–24 season to join the staff at Vanderbilt as an assistant coach.

== Head coaching record ==
Record table
Season	Team	Overall	Conference	Standing	Postseason
Mississippi State Bulldogs (Southeastern Conference) (2012–2015)
2012–13	Mississippi State	10–22	4–14	T–12th	
2013–14	Mississippi State	14–19	3–15	14th	
2014–15	Mississippi State	13–19	6–12	T–11th	
Mississippi State:		37–60 (.381)	13–41 (.241)		
Southeast Missouri State Redhawks (Ohio Valley Conference) (2015–2020)
2015–16	Southeast Missouri State	5–24	2–14	6th (West)	
2016–17	Southeast Missouri State	15–18	9–7	2nd (West)	
2017–18	Southeast Missouri State	14–17	8–10	7th	
2018–19	Southeast Missouri State	10–21	5–13	11th	
2019–20	Southeast Missouri State	7–24	3–15	12th	
Southeast Missouri State:		51–104 (.329)	27–59 (.314)		
Total:		88–164 (.349)			
