= 2012–13 Vanderbilt Commodores men's basketball team =

American college basketball season

2012–13 Vanderbilt Commodores men's basketball
- Conference: Southeastern Conference
- Record: 16–17 (8–10 SEC)
- Head coach: Kevin Stallings (14th season)
- Assistant coaches: Brad Frederick; Tom Richardson; David Cason
- Home arena: Memorial Gymnasium

2012–13 Southeastern Conference men's basketball standings
	Conf.				Overall
Team	W		L	PCT	W		L	PCT
No. 14 Florida	14	–	4	.778	29	–	8	.784
Ole Miss †	12	–	6	.667	27	–	9	.750
Alabama	12	–	6	.667	23	–	13	.639
Kentucky	12	–	6	.667	21	–	12	.636
Missouri	11	–	7	.611	23	–	11	.676
Tennessee	11	–	7	.611	20	–	13	.606
Arkansas	10	–	8	.556	19	–	13	.594
LSU	9	–	9	.500	19	–	12	.613
Georgia	9	–	9	.500	15	–	17	.469
Vanderbilt	8	–	10	.444	16	–	17	.485
Texas A&M	7	–	11	.389	18	–	15	.545
South Carolina	4	–	14	.222	14	–	18	.438
Mississippi State	4	–	14	.222	10	–	22	.313
Auburn	3	–	15	.167	9	–	23	.281
† 2013 SEC tournament winner As of March 31, 2013; Rankings from AP poll

The 2012–13 Vanderbilt Commodores Men's Basketball Team represented Vanderbilt University in the 2012–13 college basketball season. The team's head coach was Kevin Stallings, in his fourteenth season at Vanderbilt. The team plays their home games at Memorial Gymnasium in Nashville, Tennessee, as a member of the Southeastern Conference.

== Previous season ==
After a 21–10 regular season that fell short of lofty preseason expectations, the Commodores captured their first SEC tournament championship in 61 seasons on March 11, 2012, by defeating top-ranked Kentucky in the SEC Tournament finals. The Commodores advanced to their third consecutive NCAA tournament where they defeated Harvard in the second round before falling the third round to Wisconsin to finish the season 25–11.

=== Departures ===
Vanderbilt suffered devastating personnel losses after the 2011–12 season; of their six leading scorers, five graduated and the other declared for the 2012 NBA draft. In all, the Commodores lost 88.1% of their scoring from 2011 to 2012. Also, the Commodores' returning players had started a total of three games in the 2011–12 season. Of the 14 SEC teams in the 2012–13 season, Vanderbilt was one of only three that did not return a player who averaged double figures in points in the previous season, and the only team that returned fewer starts was Kentucky, which did not return a single player who had started a game in 2011–12.

In addition, for the second straight offseason, a Vanderbilt assistant accepted a Division I head coaching position. In the 2011 offseason, King Rice left to become the head coach at Monmouth. This offseason, Dan Muller returned to his alma mater of Illinois State. Stallings chose not to hire a new assistant. Previously, he had rotated the administrative role of director of basketball operations among his assistants. This season, he named former Commodores player Dan Cage as director of basketball operations and removed that role from his assistants.

Name	Number	Pos.	Height	Weight	Year	Hometown	Notes
Festus Ezeli	3	C	6'11"	255	Senior (redshirt)	Benin City, Nigeria	Graduated
Lance Goulbourne	5	G/F	6'8"	230	Senior	Brooklyn, New York	Graduated
Jordan Smart	12	SG	6'6"	200	Junior (redshirt)	Lexington, Kentucky	Graduated; did not return to team
John Jenkins	23	SG	6'3"	210	Junior	Hendersonville, Tennessee	Declared for NBA draft
Aaron Noll	14	SF	6'7"	220	Senior	Fort Mitchell, Kentucky	Graduated
Jeffery Taylor	44	G/F	6'7"	225	Senior	Norrköping, Sweden	Graduated
Steve Tchiengang	33	PF	6'9"	245	Senior	Douala, Cameroon	Graduated
Brad Tinsley	1	PG	6'4"	220	Senior	Oregon City, Oregon	Graduated

== Roster ==
2012–13 Vanderbilt Commodores men's basketball team
Players
Coaches

Pos.	#	Name	Height	Weight	Year	Hometown
F	0	Rod Odom	6 ft 9 in (2.06 m)	215 lb (98 kg)	Jr	Central Islip, New York
G	1	Eric McClellan (redshirt)	6 ft 4 in (1.93 m)	180 lb (82 kg)	So	Austin, Texas
G	2	Kedren Johnson	6 ft 4 in (1.93 m)	215 lb (98 kg)	So	Lewisburg, Tennessee
G	5	Alex Gendelman (W)	6 ft 0 in (1.83 m)	180 lb (82 kg)	Fr	Purchase, New York
G	10	Nathan Watkins (W)	6 ft 5 in (1.96 m)	190 lb (86 kg)	Fr	Brentwood, Tennessee
G	11	Kyle Fuller	6 ft 1 in (1.85 m)	200 lb (91 kg)	Jr	Moreno Valley, California
G	14	Carter Josephs (W)	5 ft 10 in (1.78 m)	165 lb (75 kg)	Fr	San Antonio, Texas
G	15	Kevin Bright	6 ft 5 in (1.96 m)	210 lb (95 kg)	Fr	Mannheim, Germany
G	20	A.J. Astroth	6 ft 6 in (1.98 m)	200 lb (91 kg)	Fr	Tampa, Florida
F	21	Sheldon Jeter	6 ft 7 in (2.01 m)	215 lb (98 kg)	Fr	Beaver Falls, Pennsylvania
G	24	Dai-Jon Parker	6 ft 3 in (1.91 m)	190 lb (86 kg)	So	Baton Rouge, Louisiana
F	34	Shelby Moats	6 ft 8 in (2.03 m)	225 lb (102 kg)	So	Waconia, Minnesota
F	35	James Siakam	6 ft 6 in (1.98 m)	210 lb (95 kg)	RS So	Douala, Cameroon
C	40	Josh Henderson	6 ft 11 in (2.11 m)	230 lb (104 kg)	RS So	Roanoke, Virginia

Head coach

- Kevin Stallings (Purdue)

Assistant coach(es)

- Brad Frederick (North Carolina)
- Tom Richardson (St. Xavier (IL))
- David Cason (Illinois State)

Legend

- (C) Team captain
- (S) Suspended
- (I) Ineligible
- (W) Walk-on
- Injured
- Current redshirt

Roster
Last update: 2012-09-26

== Schedule ==
Date time, TV	Rank^{#}	Opponent^{#}	Result	Record	High points	High rebounds	High assists	Site (attendance) city, state
Exhibition
Nov. 2, 2012*; 7:00 p.m.		St. Xavier	W 77–69		22 – Siakam	17 – Siakam	6 – Fuller	Memorial Gymnasium (–); Nashville, Tennessee
Nov. 5, 2012*; 7:00 p.m.		Delta State	W 69–48		18 – Johnson	7 – Siakam	3 – Fuller	Memorial Gymnasium (–); Nashville, Tennessee
Non-conference regular season
Nov. 10, 2012*; 3:00 p.m.		Nicholls State	W 80–65	1–0	21 – Hunter	10 – Hunter	3 – McBeath	Memorial Gymnasium (7,655); Nashville, Tennessee
Nov. 16, 2012*; 10:00 p.m., Pac-12		at Oregon	L 48–74	1–1	17 – Fuller	8 – Bright	3 – Johnson	Matthew Knight Arena (9,137); Eugene, Oregon
Nov. 22, 2012*; 1:00 p.m., ESPN2		vs. Davidson; Old Spice Classic	L 62–75	1–2	28 – Johnson	6 – Fuller	2 – Bright	HP Field House (3,423); Lake Buena Vista, Florida
Nov. 23, 2012*; 3:00 p.m., ESPNU		vs. Marist; Old Spice Classic	L 33–50	1–3	8 – Siakam	8 – Tied	3 – Johnson	HP Field House (2,927); Lake Buena Vista, Florida
Nov. 25, 2012*; 2:00 p.m., ESPN3		vs. UTEP; Old Spice Classic 7th place	W 73–49	2–3	17 – Johnson	7 – Odom	5 – Fuller	HP Field House (1,080); Lake Buena Vista, Florida
Dec. 1, 2012*; 4:00 p.m., ESPN2		Villanova; SEC-Big East Challenge	L 52–62	2–4	14 – Odom	12 – Bright	4 – Tied	Memorial Gymnasium (9,365); Nashville, Tennessee
Dec. 6, 2012*; 6:30 p.m., ESPNU		at Xavier	W 66–64 ^{OT}	3–4	25 – Fuller	10 – Bright	5 – Fuller	Cintas Center (10,011); Cincinnati
Dec. 15, 2012*; 7:00 p.m.		Alabama A&M	W 71–46	4–4	19 – Johnson	8 – Bright	3 – Tied	Memorial Gymnasium (9,880); Nashville, Tennessee
Dec. 17, 2012*; 8:00 p.m., ESPNU		Cornell	W 66–55	5–4	17 – Fuller	7 – Odom	3 – Tied	Memorial Gymnasium (9,716); Nashville, Tennessee
Dec. 21, 2012*; 8:00 p.m., ESPNU		vs. Middle Tennessee	L 52–56	5–5	25 – Johnson	6 – Bright	2 – Tied	Bridgestone Arena (8,307); Nashville, Tennessee
Dec. 29, 2012*; 7:00 p.m., ESPNU		No. 18 Butler	L 49–68	5–6	10 – Fuller	5 – Tied	4 – Johnson	Memorial Gymnasium (11,990); Nashville, Tennessee
Jan. 2, 2013*; 7:00 p.m., CSS/ESPN3		William & Mary	W 64–50	6–6	14 – Jeter	7 – Henderson	4 – Fuller	Memorial Gymnasium (9,965); Nashville, Tennessee
SEC Regular Season
Jan. 10, 2013; 8:00 p.m., ESPN		Kentucky	L 58–60	6–7 (0–1)	18 – Johnson	10 – Moats	6 – Johnson	Memorial Gymnasium (14,316); Nashville, Tennessee
Jan. 12, 2013; 5:00 p.m., FSN/ESPN3		at Arkansas	L 33–56	6–8 (0–2)	8 – Jeter	7 – Siakam	2 – Tied	Bud Walton Arena (14,315); Fayetteville, Arkansas
Jan. 15, 2013; 8:00 p.m., ESPNU		Ole Miss	L 79–89 ^{OT}	6–9 (0–3)	19 – Johnson	8 – Moats	8 – Johnson	Memorial Gymnasium (8,851); Nashville, Tennessee
Jan. 19, 2013; 12:30 p.m., SECN/ESPN3		at South Carolina	W 58–51	7–9 (1–3)	12 – Fuller	8 – Johnson	4 – Johnson	Colonial Life Arena (11,175); Columbia, South Carolina
Jan. 23, 2013; 7:00 p.m., ESPN3		Auburn	W 73–61	8–9 (2–3)	15 – Johnson	7 – Johnson	4 – Tied	Memorial Gymnasium (9,961); Nashville, Tennessee
Jan. 26, 2013; 4:00 p.m., ESPNU		at #22 Missouri	L 59–81	8–10 (2–4)	17 – Odom	4 – Siakam	3 – Tied	Mizzou Arena (15,061); Columbia, Missouri
Jan. 29, 2013; 6:00 p.m., ESPNU		at Tennessee	L 57–58	8–11 (2–5)	14 – Johnson	7 – Jeter	2 – Tied	Thompson–Boling Arena (16,391); Knoxville, Tennessee
Feb. 2, 2013; 3:00 p.m., SECN/ESPN3		Alabama	L 54–58	8–12 (2–6)	15 – Johnson	7 – Johnson	3 – Tied	Memorial Gymnasium (12,345); Nashville, Tennessee
Feb. 6, 2013; 7:00 p.m., ESPN3		at LSU	L 56–57	8–13 (2–7)	20 – Odom	9 – Parker	5 – Johnson	Maravich Center (7,075); Baton Rouge, Louisiana
Feb. 9, 2013; 12:30 p.m., SECN/ESPN3		Arkansas	W 67–49	9–13 (3–7)	15 – Odom	7 – Bright	5 – Johnson	Memorial Gymnasium (10,886); Nashville, Tennessee
Feb. 13, 2013; 7:00 p.m., SECN/ESPN3		Tennessee	L 46–58	9–14 (3–8)	11 – Johnson	11 – Bright	4 – Johnson	Memorial Gymnasium (12,868); Nashville, Tennessee
Feb. 16, 2013; 5:30 p.m., FSN/ESPN3		Texas A&M	W 63–56	10–14 (4–8)	19 – Odom	7 – Odom	6 – Fuller	Memorial Gymnasium (11,269); Nashville, Tennessee
Feb. 20, 2013; 7:00 p.m., SECN/ESPN3		at Kentucky	L 70–74	10–15 (4–9)	17 – Johnson	7 – Parker	7 – Johnson	Rupp Arena (22,887); Lexington, Kentucky
Feb. 23, 2013; 12:45 p.m., SECN/ESPN3		at Mississippi State	W 72–31	11–15 (5–9)	15 – Bright	13 – Parker	6 – Parker	Humphrey Coliseum (6,442); Starkville, Mississippi
Feb. 27, 2013; 8:00 p.m., FSN/ESPN3		Georgia	W 63–62	12–15 (6–9)	17 – Johnson	6 – Bright	5 – Johnson	Memorial Gymnasium (10,211); Nashville, Tennessee
Mar. 2, 2013; 8:00 p.m., ESPN2		at Auburn	W 62–55	13–15 (7–9)	16 – Johnson	8 – Bright	8 – Johnson	Auburn Arena (7,295); Auburn, Alabama
Mar. 6, 2013; 7:00 p.m., SECN/ESPN3		at #11 Florida	L 40–66	13–16 (7–10)	15 – Johnson	6 – Tied	1 – Tied	O'Connell Center (10,504); Gainesville, Florida
Mar. 9, 2013; 12:30 p.m., SECN		South Carolina	W 74–64	14–16 (8–10)	18 – Tied	8 – Odom	3 – Tied	Memorial Gymnasium (10,279); Nashville, Tennessee
2013 SEC tournament
Mar. 14, 2013; 6:30 p.m., SECN/ESPN3		vs. Arkansas; Second round	W 75–72	15–16	20 – Odom	7 – Tied	5 – Johnson	Bridgestone Arena (11,798); Nashville, Tennessee
Mar. 15, 2013; 6:30 p.m., SECN/ESPN3		vs. Kentucky; Quarterfinals	W 64–48	16–16	12 – Parker	6 – Tied	3 – Johnson	Bridgestone Arena (18,192); Nashville, Tennessee
Mar. 16, 2013; 2:30 p.m., ABC		vs. Ole Miss; Semifinals	L 52–64	16–17	12 – Johnson	8 – Bright	3 – Johnson	Bridgestone Arena (14,574); Nashville, Tennessee
*Non-Conference Game. Rankings from AP poll. All times are in Central Time.
