= 2013 National Invitation Tournament =

Annual NCAA basketball competition

- Season: 2012–13
- Teams: 32
- Finals site: Madison Square Garden, New York City
- Champions: Baylor Bears (1st title)
- Runner-up: Iowa Hawkeyes (1st title game)
- Semifinalists: BYU Cougars (3rd semifinal); Maryland Terrapins (3rd semifinal)
- Winning coach: Scott Drew (1st title)
- MVP: Pierre Jackson (Baylor)

The 2013 National Invitation Tournament was a single-elimination tournament of 32 NCAA Division I teams that were not selected to participate in the 2013 NCAA tournament. The annual tournament began on March 19 on campus sites and ended on April 4 at Madison Square Garden. Baylor defeated Iowa, 74–54, to capture the Bears its first NIT title in school history.

== Participants ==
=== Automatic qualifiers ===
The following teams earned automatic berths into the 2013 NIT field by virtue of winning their conferences' regular season championship, but failing to win their conference tournament. These teams also did not receive an at-large bid for the NCAA tournament.

| Team | Conference | Record | Appearance | Last bid |
|---|---|---|---|---|
| Charleston Southern | Big South | 19–12 | 1st | Never |
| Long Beach State | Big West | 19–13 | 7th | 2011 |
| Louisiana Tech | WAC | 26–6 | 7th | 2006 |
| Mercer | Atlantic Sun | 23–11 | 1st | Never |
| Niagara | MAAC | 19–13 | 14th | 2009 |
| Norfolk State | MEAC | 21–11 | 1st | Never |
| Northeastern | CAA | 20–12 | 3rd | 2010 |
| Robert Morris | Northeast | 23–10 | 2nd | 2008 |
| Stephen F. Austin | Southland | 27–4 | 3rd | 2008 |
| Stony Brook | America East | 24–7 | 3rd | 2012 |

=== At-large bids ===
The following 22 teams were also awarded NIT berths.

| Team | Conference | Record | Appearance | Last bid |
|---|---|---|---|---|
| Alabama | SEC | 21–12 | 12th | 2011 |
| Arizona State | Pac-12 | 21–12 | 12th | 2010 |
| Baylor | Big 12 | 18–14 | 5th | 2009 |
| BYU | West Coast | 21–11 | 11th | 2006 |
| Charlotte | Atlantic 10 | 21–11 | 7th | 2008 |
| Denver | WAC | 21–9 | 3rd | 2005 |
| Detroit | Horizon | 20–12 | 7th | 2002 |
| Florida State | ACC | 18–15 | 8th | 2008 |
| Indiana State | Missouri Valley | 18–14 | 3rd | 1978 |
| Iowa | Big Ten | 21–12 | 7th | 2012 |
| Kentucky | SEC | 21–11 | 8th | 2009 |
| Maryland | ACC | 22–12 | 8th | 2008 |
| Ohio | MAC | 24–9 | 5th | 1999 |
| Providence | Big East | 17–14 | 19th | 2009 |
| Saint Joseph's | Atlantic 10 | 18–13 | 16th | 2012 |
| Southern Miss | C-USA | 25–9 | 9th | 2001 |
| St. John's | Big East | 16–15 | 29th | 2010 |
| Stanford | Pac-12 | 18–14 | 7th | 2012 |
| Tennessee | SEC | 20–12 | 13th | 2012 |
| UMass | Atlantic 10 | 21–11 | 13th | 2012 |
| Virginia | ACC | 21–11 | 13th | 2006 |
| Washington | Pac-12 | 18–15 | 7th | 2012 |

=== Seeds ===
Kentucky Bracket
| Seed | School | Conference | Record | Berth type |
|---|---|---|---|---|
| 1 | Kentucky | SEC | 21–11 | At-large |
| 2 | Baylor | Big 12 | 18–14 | At-large |
| 3 | Arizona State | Pac-12 | 21–12 | At-large |
| 4 | Providence | Big East | 17–14 | At-large |
| 5 | Charlotte | Atlantic 10 | 21–11 | At-large |
| 6 | Detroit | Horizon | 20–12 | At-large |
| 7 | Long Beach State | Big West | 19–13 | Automatic |
| 8 | Robert Morris | NEC | 23–10 | Automatic |

Alabama Bracket
| Seed | School | Conference | Record | Berth type |
|---|---|---|---|---|
| 1 | Alabama | SEC | 21–12 | At-large |
| 2 | Maryland | ACC | 22–12 | At-large |
| 3 | Denver | WAC | 21–9 | At-large |
| 4 | Stanford | Pac-12 | 18–14 | At-large |
| 5 | Stephen F. Austin | Southland | 27–4 | Automatic |
| 6 | Ohio | MAC | 24–9 | At-large |
| 7 | Niagara | MAAC | 19–13 | Automatic |
| 8 | Northeastern | CAA | 20–12 | Automatic |

Southern Miss Bracket
| Seed | School | Conference | Record | Berth type |
|---|---|---|---|---|
| 1 | Southern Miss | C-USA | 25–9 | At-large |
| 2 | Tennessee | SEC | 20–12 | At-large |
| 3 | BYU | WCC | 21–11 | At-large |
| 4 | Florida State | ACC | 18–15 | At-large |
| 5 | Louisiana Tech | WAC | 26–6 | Automatic |
| 6 | Washington | Pac-12 | 18–15 | At-large |
| 7 | Mercer | Atlantic Sun | 23–11 | Automatic |
| 8 | Charleston Southern | Big South | 19–12 | Automatic |

Virginia Bracket
| Seed | School | Conference | Record | Berth type |
|---|---|---|---|---|
| 1 | Virginia | ACC | 21–11 | At-large |
| 2 | Massachusetts | Atlantic 10 | 21–11 | At-large |
| 3 | Iowa | Big Ten | 21–12 | At-large |
| 4 | St. Joseph's | Atlantic 10 | 18–13 | At-large |
| 5 | St. John's | Big East | 16–15 | At-large |
| 6 | Indiana State | MVC | 18–14 | At-large |
| 7 | Stony Brook | America East | 24–7 | Automatic |
| 8 | Norfolk State | MEAC | 21–11 | Automatic |

== Bracket ==
Games are played at higher seed unless noted.

First round March 19–20
1 | Kentucky | 57
8 | Robert Morris | 59
4 | Providence | 75
5 | Charlotte | 66
3 | Arizona State | 83
6 | Detroit | 68
2 | Baylor | 112
7 | Long Beach State | 66

Second round March 21–25
8 | Robert Morris | 68
4 | Providence | 77
3 | Arizona State | 86
2 | Baylor | 89

Quarterfinals; March 26–27
4 | Providence | 68
2 | Baylor | 79

First round March 19–20
1 | Southern Miss | 78
8 | Charleston Southern | 71
4 | Florida State | 66
5 | Louisiana Tech | 71
3 | BYU | 90
6 | Washington | 79
2 | Tennessee | 67
7 | Mercer | 75

Second round March 21–25
1 | Southern Miss | 63
5 | Louisiana Tech | 52
3 | BYU | 90
7 | Mercer | 71

Quarterfinals; March 26–27
1 | Southern Miss | 62
3 | BYU | 79

First round March 19–20
1 | Alabama | 62
8 | Northeastern | 43
4 | Stanford | 58
5 | Stephen F. Austin | 57
3 | Denver | 61
6 | Ohio | 57
2 | Maryland | 86
7 | Niagara | 70

Second round March 21–25
1 | Alabama | 66
4 | Stanford | 54
3 | Denver | 52
2 | Maryland | 62

Quarterfinals; March 26–27
1 | Alabama | 57
2 | Maryland | 58

First round March 19–20
1 | Virginia | 67
8 | Norfolk State | 56
4 | St. Joseph's | 61
5 | St. John's | 63
3 | Iowa | 68
6 | Indiana State | 52
2 | Massachusetts | 58
7 | Stony Brook | 71

Second round March 21–25
1 | Virginia | 68
5 | St. John's | 50
3 | Iowa | 75
7 | Stony Brook | 63

Quarterfinals; March 26–27
1 | Virginia | 64
3 | Iowa | 75

Semifinals; April 2
2 | Baylor | 76
3 | BYU | 70
2 | Maryland | 60
3 | Iowa | 71

Finals; April 4
2 | Baylor | 74
3 | Iowa | 54

== See also ==
- 2013 Women's National Invitation Tournament
- 2013 NCAA Division I men's basketball tournament
- 2013 NCAA Division II men's basketball tournament
- 2013 NCAA Division III men's basketball tournament
- 2013 NCAA Division I women's basketball tournament
- 2013 NCAA Division II women's basketball tournament
- 2013 NCAA Division III women's basketball tournament
- 2013 NAIA Division I men's basketball tournament
- 2013 NAIA Division II men's basketball tournament
- 2013 NAIA Division I women's basketball tournament
- NAIA Division II Women's Basketball Championship
- 2013 College Basketball Invitational
- 2013 CollegeInsider.com Postseason Tournament
