= 2012–13 Texas State Bobcats men's basketball team =

American college basketball season

2012–13 Texas State Bobcats men's basketball
- Conference: Western Athletic Conference
- Record: 12–22 (5–13 WAC)
- Head coach: Doug Davalos (7th season)
- Assistant coaches: Rob Flaska; Eric Brand; Jason Burton
- Home arena: Strahan Coliseum

2012–13 WAC men's basketball standings
	Conf.				Overall
Team	W		L	PCT	W		L	PCT
Louisiana Tech*	16	–	2	.889	27	–	7	.794
Denver	16	–	2	.889	22	–	10	.688
New Mexico State †	14	–	4	.778	24	–	11	.686
Utah State	11	–	7	.611	21	–	10	.677
Texas–Arlington	11	–	7	.611	19	–	14	.576
Idaho	7	–	11	.389	12	–	18	.400
Texas State	5	–	13	.278	12	–	22	.353
UTSA	3	–	14	.176	10	–	22	.313
San Jose State	3	–	14	.176	9	–	20	.310
Seattle	3	–	15	.167	8	–	22	.267
† 2013 WAC tournament winner As of March 25, 2013 * WAC Tournament #1 seed Rankings from AP Poll

The 2012–13 Texas State Bobcats men's basketball team represented Texas State University during the 2012–13 NCAA Division I men's basketball season. The Bobcats, led by seventh year head coach Doug Davalos, played their home games at Strahan Coliseum and were first year members of the Western Athletic Conference. They finished the season 12–22, 5–13 in WAC play to finish in seventh place. They advanced to the semifinals of the WAC tournament where they lost to New Mexico State.

This was their only season as a member of the WAC as they joined the Sun Belt Conference in July 2013.

== Roster ==
Number	Name	Position	Height	Weight	Year	Hometown
0	Phil Hawkins	Guard	6–0	195	Junior	Washington, D.C.
1	Vonn Jones	Guard	5–11	165	Senior	Hartland, Michigan
3	Reid Koenen	Forward	6–7	200	Junior	Racine, Wisconsin
4	Ray Dorsey	Guard	6–3	170	Freshman	Lewisville, Texas
5	Corey Stern	Forward	6–7	220	Junior	Seattle, Washington
10	Wesley Davis	Guard	6–3	185	Sophomore	Arlington, Texas
12	Justin Tanton	Guard	6-3	210	Senior	Dripping Springs, Texas
13	Darius Richardson	Guard	6–4	205	Sophomore	Fort Bend, Texas
15	Jeffrey Nwankwo	Forward	6–7	225	Sophomore	Houston, Texas
20	Donte Bachus	Forward	6–7	230	Sophomore	Houston, Texas
21	Matt Staff	Forward	6–10	235	Senior	Houston, Texas
22	Basil Brown II	Forward	6–5	195	Sophomore	Dallas, Texas
23	Deonte' Jones	Guard	6–2	180	Junior	Charleston, Missouri
25	Joel Wright	Forward	6–7	225	Junior	Brooklyn, New York
30	Gordon Ball	Forward	6–8	240	Senior	Houston, Texas
44	Nick Hinton	Forward	6–9	225	Sophomore	Frisco, Texas

== Schedule ==
Date time, TV	Opponent	Result	Record	Site (attendance) city, state
Regular season
11/09/2012*; 7:00 pm	Fordham	W 86–76	1–0	Strahan Coliseum (2,833); San Marcos, TX
11/13/2012*; 7:00 pm	UT–Tyler	W 86–66	2–0	Strahan Coliseum (1,449); San Marcos, TX
11/17/2012*; 7:00 pm	SMU	L 75–78	2–1	Strahan Coliseum (2,008); San Marcos, TX
11/22/2012*; 10:30 pm, CBSSN	vs. Charlotte; Great Alaska Shootout First Round	L 64–73	2–2	Sullivan Arena (4,201); Anchorage, AK
11/23/2012*; 6:00 pm	vs. Loyola Marymount; Great Alaska Shootout Consolation Game	L 63–78	2–3	Sullivan Arena (4,168); Anchorage, AK
11/24/2012*; 3:00 pm	vs. UC Riverside; Great Alaska Shootout 7th place game	W 81–69	3–3	Sullivan Arena (4,099); Anchorage, AK
11/30/2012*; 7:00 pm	Utah	L 69–74	3–4	Strahan Coliseum (2,237); San Marcos, TX
12/05/2012*; 7:00 pm	Oral Roberts	L 77–86	3–5	Strahan Coliseum (1,609); San Marcos, TX
12/08/2012*; 2:00 pm	Texas–Pan American	W 73–58	4–5	Strahan Coliseum (1,361); San Marcos, TX
12/15/2012*; 7:00 pm, LHN	at Texas	L 63–75	4–6	Frank Erwin Center (10,189); Austin, TX
12/17/2012*; 6:00 pm, BTN	at Northwestern	L 68–74	4–7	Welsh-Ryan Arena (5,161); Evanston, IL
12/20/2012*; 6:00 pm	at Central Michigan	L 80–92	4–8	McGuirk Arena (1,215); Mount Pleasant, MI
12/29/2012; 2:00 pm	San Jose State	L 55–72	4–9 (0–1)	Strahan Coliseum (1,037); San Marcos, TX
12/31/2012; 4:00 pm	Utah State	L 57–81	4–10 (0–2)	Strahan Coliseum (1,165); San Marcos, TX
01/03/2013; 8:00 pm	at Denver	L 53–64	4–11 (0–3)	Magness Arena (2,306); Denver, CO
01/05/2013; 8:00 pm, ESPN3	at New Mexico State	L 67–78	4–12 (0–4)	Pan American Center (4,951); Las Cruces, NM
01/10/2013; 7:00 pm	Louisiana Tech	L 67–84	4–13 (0–5)	Strahan Coliseum (1,011); San Marcos, TX
01/12/2013; 2:00 pm	Texas–Arlington	L 74–91	4–14 (0–6)	Strahan Coliseum (1,055); San Marcos, TX
01/19/2013; 4:00 pm	at UTSA	W 81–78 ^{OT}	5–14 (1–6)	Convocation Center (2,359); San Antonio, TX
01/24/2013; 9:05 pm	at Idaho	W 78–73	6–14 (2–6)	Cowan Spectrum (1,279); Moscow, ID
01/26/2013; 9:00 pm	at Seattle	W 86–83	7–14 (3–6)	KeyArena (2,580); Seattle, WA
01/31/2013; 7:00 pm	New Mexico State	L 72–86	7–15 (3–7)	Strahan Coliseum (2,011); San Marcos, TX
02/02/2013; 2:00 pm	Denver	L 64–79	7–16 (3–8)	Strahan Coliseum (1,520); San Marcos, TX
02/07/2013; 7:00 pm	at Texas–Arlington	L 50–75	7–17 (3–9)	College Park Center (2,053); Arlington, TX
02/09/2013; 7:00 pm	at Louisiana Tech	L 69–84	7–18 (3–10)	Thomas Assembly Center (4,435); Ruston, LA
02/16/2013; 4:00 pm	UTSA	L 62–73	7–19 (3–11)	Strahan Coliseum (3,124); San Marcos, TX
02/23/2013*; 6:00 pm	at Lamar; BracketBusters	W 74–61	8–19	Montagne Center (2,079); Beaumont, TX
02/28/2013; 7:00 pm	Seattle	W 67–65	9–19 (4–11)	Strahan Coliseum (1,524); San Marcos, TX
03/02/2013; 2:00 pm	Idaho	L 81–90	9–20 (4–12)	Strahan Coliseum (1,585); San Marcos, TX
03/07/2013; 8:05 pm, ESPN3	at Utah State	L 61–77	9–21 (4–13)	Smith Spectrum (7,123); Logan, UT
03/09/2013; 9:00 pm	at San Jose State	W 90–67	10–21 (5–13)	Event Center Arena (2,087); San Jose, CA
WAC tournament
03/12/2013; 8:00 pm	vs. Seattle; First Round	W 68–56	11–21	Orleans Arena (N/A); Paradise, NV
03/14/2013; 4:30 pm	vs. Denver; Quarterfinals	W 72–68	12–21	Orleans Arena (N/A); Paradise, NV
03/15/2013; 8:00 pm	vs. New Mexico State; Semifinals	L 65–74	12–22	Orleans Arena (949); Paradise, NV
*Non-conference game. ^{#}Rankings from AP Poll. (#) Tournament seedings in parentheses. All times are in Central Time.
