= 2012–13 Denver Pioneers men's basketball team =

American college basketball season

2012–13 Denver Pioneers men's basketball

WAC Regular Season Co–Champions

NIT, Second Round
- Conference: Western Athletic Conference
- Record: 22–10 (16–2 WAC)
- Head coach: Joe Scott (6th season)
- Assistant coaches: Mike McKee; John Fitzgerald; A.J. Kuhle
- Home arena: Magness Arena

2012–13 WAC men's basketball standings
	Conf.				Overall
Team	W		L	PCT	W		L	PCT
Louisiana Tech*	16	–	2	.889	27	–	7	.794
Denver	16	–	2	.889	22	–	10	.688
New Mexico State †	14	–	4	.778	24	–	11	.686
Utah State	11	–	7	.611	21	–	10	.677
Texas–Arlington	11	–	7	.611	19	–	14	.576
Idaho	7	–	11	.389	12	–	18	.400
Texas State	5	–	13	.278	12	–	22	.353
UTSA	3	–	14	.176	10	–	22	.313
San Jose State	3	–	14	.176	9	–	20	.310
Seattle	3	–	15	.167	8	–	22	.267
† 2013 WAC tournament winner As of March 25, 2013 * WAC Tournament #1 seed Rankings from AP Poll

The 2012–13 Denver Pioneers men's basketball team represented the University of Denver during the 2012–13 NCAA Division I men's basketball season. The Pioneers, led by sixth year head coach Joe Scott, played their home games at Magness Arena and were first year members of the Western Athletic Conference. This was their only year as a member of the WAC as they joined The Summit League in July 2013.

They finished the season 22–10, 16–2 in WAC play to claim a share of the regular season conference championship with Louisiana Tech. They lost in the quarterfinals of the 2013 WAC tournament to Texas State. They were invited to the 2013 NIT where they defeated Ohio in the first round before losing in the second round to Maryland.

== Roster ==
Number	Name	Position	Height	Weight	Year	Hometown
3	Jalen Love	Guard	6–3	165	Freshman	Wichita, Kansas
14	Blake Foeman	Forward	6–7	205	Junior	Weston, Florida
20	Royce O'Neale	Forward	6–5	202	Sophomore	Killeen, Texas
21	Bryant Rucker	Guard	6–0	180	Freshman	Frisco, Texas
22	Charles Webb	Guard	5–5	155	Junior	Erie, Colorado
23	Brett Olson	Guard	6–5	170	Sophomore	Highlands Ranch, Colorado
24	Dom Samac	Forward	6–8	180	Freshman	Zagreb, Croatia
25	Jake Logan	Center	6–8	215	Freshman	Norwalk, Iowa
30	Cam Griffin	Guard	6–5	210	Sophomore	San Antonio, Texas
32	Chase Hallam	Guard	6–5	210	Senior	Mesquite, Texas
33	Nate Engesser	Guard	6–3	180	Freshman	Colorado Springs, Colorado
34	Chris Udofia	Forward	6–6	194	Junior	Irving, Texas
35	Marcus Byrd	Forward	6–7	187	Freshman	Highlands Ranch, Colorado
44	Griffin McKenzie	Forward	6–9	240	Junior	Cincinnati, Ohio

== Schedule ==
Date time, TV	Opponent	Result	Record	Site (attendance) city, state
Regular season
11/09/2012*; 7:00 pm, ESPN3	at Iona	L 58–65	0–1	Hynes Athletic Center (2,140); New Rochelle, NY
11/14/2012*; 7:00 pm	Texas A&M-Corpus Christi	W 68–51	1–1	Magness Arena (4,777); Denver, CO
11/16/2012*; 6:00 pm, RTRM	California	L 61–72	1–2	Magness Arena (4,337); Denver, CO
11/21/2012*; 7:00 pm, RTRM	Colorado State	L 53–60	1–3	Magness Arena (4,883); Denver, CO
11/27/2012*; 6:00 pm	at Southern Miss	L 50–61	1–4	Reed Green Coliseum (3,597); Hattiesburg, MS
12/02/2012*; 3:00 pm, P12N	at Stanford	L 58–71	1–5	Maples Pavilion (4,340); Stanford, CA
12/05/2012*; 7:00 pm	Mercer	W 69–40	2–5	Magness Arena (1,341); Denver, CO
12/15/2012*; 4:00 pm	Nebraska–Omaha	W 82–47	3–5	Magness Arena (4,244); Denver, CO
12/18/2012*; 7:00 pm	at Wyoming	L 61–71	3–6	Arena-Auditorium (4,519); Laramie, WY
12/21/2012*; 4:00 pm	Southern Utah	W 72–47	4–6	Magness Arena (2,030); Denver, CO
12/29/2012; 6:00 pm, ESPN+/ESPN3	at Louisiana Tech	L 60–68	4–7 (0–1)	Thomas Assembly Center (2,295); Ruston, LA
12/31/2012; 1:00 pm	at Texas–Arlington	W 50–35	5–7 (1–1)	College Park Center (1,066); Arlington, TX
01/03/2013; 7:00 pm	Texas State	W 64–53	6–7 (2–1)	Magness Arena (2,306); Denver, CO
01/06/2013; 2:00 pm	UTSA	W 75–50	7–7 (3–1)	Magness Arena (2,924); Denver, CO
01/10/2013; 8:05 pm	at Idaho	W 55–49	8–7 (4–1)	Cowan Spectrum (1,127); Moscow, ID
01/12/2013; 4:30 pm, RTRM	at Seattle	W 64–51	9–7 (5–1)	KeyArena (3,149); Seattle, WA
01/17/2013; 7:00 pm	San Jose State	W 73–37	10–7 (6–1)	Magness Arena (1,406); Denver, CO
01/19/2013; 4:30 pm, RTRM	Utah State	W 68–57	11–7 (7–1)	Magness Arena (2,621); Denver, CO
01/23/2013; 9:00 pm, ESPNU	at New Mexico State	L 42–53	11–8 (7–2)	Pan American Center (6,394); Las Cruces, NM
01/31/2013; 6:00 pm	at UTSA	W 71–57	12–8 (8–2)	Convocation Center (1,317); San Antonio, TX
02/02/2013; 1:00 pm	at Texas State	W 79–64	13–8 (9–2)	Strahan Coliseum (1,520); San Marcos, TX
02/07/2013; 7:00 pm, RTRM	Seattle	W 72–55	14–8 (10–2)	Magness Arena (1,770); Denver, CO
02/09/2013; 4:00 pm, RTRM	Idaho	W 74–58	15–8 (11–2)	Magness Arena (5,257); Denver, CO
02/14/2013; 7:05 pm, KMYU/ESPN3	at Utah State	W 63–60 ^{OT}	16–8 (12–2)	Smith Spectrum (6,978); Logan, UT
02/16/2013; 8:00 pm	at San Jose State	W 62–41	17–8 (13–2)	Event Center Arena (1,260); San Jose, CA
02/23/2013*; 6:00 pm, ESPN3	at Northern Iowa; BracketBusters	W 63–57	18–8	McLeod Center (6,325); Cedar Falls, IA
03/02/2013; 4:00 pm, ESPN3	New Mexico State	W 66–60	19–8 (14–2)	Magness Arena (5,253); Denver, CO
03/07/2013; 7:00 pm	Texas–Arlington	W 84–55	20–8 (15–2)	Magness Arena (2,630); Denver, CO
03/09/2013; 5:00 pm, RTRM	Louisiana Tech	W 78–54	21–8 (16–2)	Magness Arena (5,119); Denver, CO
2013 WAC tournament
03/14/2013; 3:30 pm	vs. Texas State; Quarterfinals	L 68–72	21–9	Orleans Arena (N/A); Paradise, NV
2013 NIT
03/19/2013*; 7:15 pm, ESPN3	Ohio; First Round	W 61–57	22–9	Magness Arena (2,094); Denver, CO
03/21/2013*; 5:00 pm, ESPNU	at Maryland; Second Round	L 52–62	22–10	Comcast Center (3,982); College Park, MD
*Non-conference game. ^{#}Rankings from AP Poll. (#) Tournament seedings in parentheses. All times are in Mountain Time.
