= 2012–13 San Jose State Spartans men's basketball team =

American college basketball season

2012–13 San Jose State Spartans men's basketball
- Conference: Western Athletic Conference
- Record: 9–20 (3–14 WAC)
- Head coach: George Nessman (8th season)
- Assistant coaches: Brent Davis; Donald Williams; Durwood McCoy
- Home arena: Event Center Arena

2012–13 WAC men's basketball standings
	Conf.				Overall
Team	W		L	PCT	W		L	PCT
Louisiana Tech*	16	–	2	.889	27	–	7	.794
Denver	16	–	2	.889	22	–	10	.688
New Mexico State †	14	–	4	.778	24	–	11	.686
Utah State	11	–	7	.611	21	–	10	.677
Texas–Arlington	11	–	7	.611	19	–	14	.576
Idaho	7	–	11	.389	12	–	18	.400
Texas State	5	–	13	.278	12	–	22	.353
UTSA	3	–	14	.176	10	–	22	.313
San Jose State	3	–	14	.176	9	–	20	.310
Seattle	3	–	15	.167	8	–	22	.267
† 2013 WAC tournament winner As of March 25, 2013 * WAC Tournament #1 seed Rankings from AP Poll

The 2012–13 San Jose State Spartans men's basketball team representsed San Jose State University during the 2012–13 NCAA Division I men's basketball season. The Spartans, led by eighth year head coach George Nessman, played their home games at the Event Center Arena and were members of the Western Athletic Conference. They finished the season 9–20, 3–14 in WAC play to finish in a tie for eighth place. They lost in the first round of the WAC tournament to UTSA.

This was their last season as a member of the WAC. San Jose State joined the Mountain West Conference in July 2013. San Jose State fired Nessman on March 13, the day after the final game.

== Preseason roster changes ==
=== Departures ===
Name	Number	Pos.	Height	Weight	Year	Hometown	Reason
Keith Shamburger	1	G	5'11"	170	Sophomore	Los Angeles, CA	Transferred to Hawaii
Calvin Douglas	5	G	6'3"	195	Senior	San Francisco, CA	Graduated
Wil Carter	15	F	6'8"	234	Senior	Pocatello, ID	Graduated
Jeremy Pope	30	G	6'0"	175	Junior	Compton, CA	Transferred to Biola
Joe Henson	32	C	6'8"	245	Junior	Pasadena, CA	Left the team due to knee injury
Garrett Ton	50	F	6'8"	213	Senior	Torrance, CA	Graduated
Matt Ballard	52	F	6'9"	236	Senior	Foothill Ranch, CA	Graduated

=== Incoming transfers ===
Name	Number	Pos.	Height	Weight	Year	Hometown	Previous School
Xavier Jones	5	G	6'4"	225	Junior	Gary, IN	John A. Logan CC
Louis Garrett	32	F	6'6"	215	Junior	St. George, UT	Salt Lake CC
Alex Brown	44	G	6'11"	210	Junior	Mount Vernon, IL	John A. Logan CC

=== Recruits ===
College recruiting
Name	Hometown	School	Height	Weight	Commit date
David Andoh; PF	Montreal, QC	IMG Academy	6 ft 7 in (2.01 m)	205 lb (93 kg)	May 17, 2012
David Andoh; PF	Recruit ratings: Scout: Rivals: (87)				
Alex Brown; PF	Colp, IL	John A. Logan CC	6 ft 10 in (2.08 m)	190 lb (86 kg)	Apr 24, 2012
Alex Brown; PF	Recruit ratings: No ratings found				
Louis Garrett; SF	St. George, UT	Salt Lake CC	6 ft 6 in (1.98 m)	215 lb (98 kg)	Apr 13, 2012
Louis Garrett; SF	Recruit ratings: No ratings found				
Xavier Jones; SG	Gary, IN	John A. Logan CC	6 ft 4 in (1.93 m)	205 lb (93 kg)	Apr 17, 2012
Xavier Jones; SG	Recruit ratings: No ratings found				
Mike VanKirk; C	Palmdale, CA	La Jolla Prep	7 ft 1 in (2.16 m)	240 lb (110 kg)	Apr 16, 2012
Mike VanKirk; C	Recruit ratings: No ratings found				
Overall recruit ranking: Scout: – Rivals: –
Note: In many cases, Scout, Rivals, 247Sports, On3, and ESPN may conflict in their listings of height and weight.; In these cases, the average was taken. ESPN grades are on a 100-point scale.; Sources: "2012 San Jose St. Basketball Commitment List". Rivals. Archived from the original on February 13, 2014.; "2012 San Jose St. Basketball Commitment List". Scout.; "San José St Spartans 2012 Player Commits". ESPN.; "Scout.com Team Recruiting Rankings". Scout.; "2012 Team Ranking". Rivals.

== Roster ==
2012–13 San Jose State Spartans men's basketball team
Players
Coaches

Pos.	#	Name	Height	Weight	Year	Previous school	Hometown
G	1	D.J. Brown	6 ft 2 in (1.88 m)	185 lb (84 kg)	RS So	Chino Hills HS	Los Angeles, CA
G	2	Jaleel Williams	6 ft 6 in (1.98 m)	215 lb (98 kg)	So	Ellison HS	Killeen, TX
G	4	Aalim Moor	6 ft 3 in (1.91 m)	194 lb (88 kg)	Sr	Saint Mary's College HS	Oakland, CA
G	5	Xavier Jones	6 ft 4 in (1.93 m)	205 lb (93 kg)	Jr	John A. Logan CC	Gary, IN
F	10	Stephon Smith	6 ft 8 in (2.03 m)	260 lb (118 kg)	So	Body of Christ Christian Academy	Dallas, TX
F	15	Chris Cunningham	6 ft 9 in (2.06 m)	240 lb (109 kg)	RS Jr	Santa Clara U	Pomona, CA
C	21	Mike VanKirk	7 ft 1 in (2.16 m)	240 lb (109 kg)	Fr	La Jolla Prep	Palmdale, CA
F	22	David Andoh	6 ft 7 in (2.01 m)	200 lb (91 kg)	Fr	IMG Academy	Montreal, QC
G	23	Chris Jones (S)	6 ft 4 in (1.93 m)	205 lb (93 kg)	Sr	Westwind Prep	Hayward, CA
G	24	LaVanne Pennington	6 ft 4 in (1.93 m)	180 lb (82 kg)	Sr	Barstow CC	San Bernardino, CA
G	30	Nick Grieves (W)	6 ft 3 in (1.91 m)	160 lb (73 kg)	So	Aptos HS	Aptos, CA
F	32	Louis Garrett	6 ft 6 in (1.98 m)	215 lb (98 kg)	Jr	Salt Lake CC	St. George, UT
G	33	James Kinney (S)	6 ft 2 in (1.88 m)	180 lb (82 kg)	Sr	CC of Eastern Utah	Champaign, IL
C	44	Alex Brown (S)	6 ft 11 in (2.11 m)	210 lb (95 kg)	Jr	John A. Logan CC	Mount Vernon, IL

Head coach

George Nessman (California)

Assistant coach(es)

Brent Davis (San Diego State)
Donald Williams (Cal State Hayward)
Tim Marrion (Washington State)

Legend

- (C) Team captain
- (S) Suspended
- (I) Ineligible
- (W) Walk-on
- Injured
- Current redshirt

Roster

=== Suspensions ===
James Kinney, the team's leading scorer, was suspended twice in the season for violating team rules: once for the December 22, 2012 game against James Madison and again beginning with the January 11, 2013 game against Utah State. On February 8, coach Nessman confirmed that Kinney's suspension would continue until the end of the season; the San Jose Mercury News reported that the suspension "is believed to be related to academics." After Kinney's second suspension, San Jose State's scoring average went down 15 points to 49.8, and the team never won a game for the rest of the season.

Starting forward Louis Garrett was also indefinitely suspended on January 11 for a violation of team rules but was reinstated on January 24.

Two more players were suspended after Kinney. Chris Jones was suspended beginning February 28, and Alex Brown was suspended beginning March 2. Jones was suspended after San Jose State student newspaper The Spartan Daily published a comment of his saying that Nessman "should have been fired a long time ago."

== Schedule ==
Date time, TV	Opponent	Result	Record	Site (attendance) city, state
Exhibition
11/01/2012*; 5:00 pm	Academy of Art	W 88–54	0–0	Event Center Arena (673); San Jose, CA
Regular season
11/09/2012*; 6:00 pm	at New Orleans	L 68–72	0–1	Lakefront Arena (1,419); New Orleans, LA
11/13/2012*; 7:00 pm	Houston	L 75-77	0–2	Event Center Arena (1,133); San Jose, CA
11/15/2012*; 7:30 pm	Weber State	W 68–67 ^{OT}	1–2	Event Center Arena (1,236); San Jose, CA
11/20/2012*; 7:00 pm	UC Santa Cruz	W 94–54	2–2	Event Center Arena (1,340); San Jose, CA
11/26/2012*; 6:00 pm, ESPNU	at No. 10 Kansas	L 57–70	2–3	Allen Fieldhouse (16,300); Lawrence, KS
12/01/2012*; 6:00 pm	at Montana State	W 82–74	3–3	Worthington Arena (2,242); Bozeman, MT
12/05/2012*; 7:00 pm	at UC Davis	W 73–64	4–3	The Pavilion (1,065); Davis, CA
12/08/2012*; 4:30 pm	Sacramento State	W 62–57	5–3	Event Center Arena (1,442); San Jose, CA
12/11/2012*; 7:00 pm	Santa Clara	L 54–75	5–4	Event Center Arena (2,037); San Jose, CA
12/22/2012*; 8:30 pm	vs. James Madison; MGM Grand Garden Classic	L 68–77	5–5	MGM Grand Garden Arena (840); Paradise, NV
12/29/2012; 12:00 pm	at Texas State	W 72–55	6–5 (1–0)	Strahan Coliseum (1,037); San Marcos, TX
12/31/2012; 12:00 pm	at UTSA	W 80–67	7–5 (2–0)	Convocation Center (865); San Antonio, TX
01/03/2013; 7:00 pm	Idaho	L 55–64	7–6 (2–1)	Event Center Arena (1,144); San Jose, CA
01/05/2013; 7:00 pm	Seattle	W 76–71	8–6 (3–1)	Event Center Arena (1,081); San Jose, CA
01/08/2013*; 7:00 pm	New Orleans	W 71–64	9–6	Event Center Arena (1,134); San Jose, CA
01/11/2013; 7:05 pm, ESPN3	at Utah State	L 60–66	9–7 (3–2)	Smith Spectrum (9,191); Logan, UT
01/17/2013; 6:00 pm	at Denver	L 37–73	9–8 (3–3)	Magness Arena (1,406); Denver, CO
01/19/2013; 6:00 pm, ESPN3	at New Mexico State	L 53–70	9–9 (3–4)	Pan American Center (6,644); Las Cruces, NM
01/24/2013; 7:00 pm	Louisiana Tech	L 54–76	9–10 (3–5)	Event Center Arena (2,624); San Jose, CA
01/26/2013; 7:00 pm	Texas–Arlington	L 47–66	9–11 (3–6)	Event Center Arena (1,027); San Jose, CA
01/31/2013; 7:00 pm	at Seattle	L 48–56	9–12 (3–7)	KeyArena (2,052); Seattle, WA
02/02/2013; 7:05 pm	at Idaho	L 63–66	9–13 (3–8)	Cowan Spectrum (950); Moscow, ID
02/08/2013; 7:00 pm	Utah State	L 36–63	9–14 (3–9)	Event Center Arena (1,876); San Jose, CA
02/14/2013; 7:00 pm	New Mexico State	L 57–67	9–15 (3–10)	Event Center Arena (1,066); San Jose, CA
02/16/2013; 7:00 pm	Denver	L 41–62	9–16 (3–11)	Event Center Arena (1,260); San Jose, CA
02/28/2013; 5:00 pm	at Texas–Arlington	L 74–81	9–17 (3–12)	College Park Center (1,308); Arlington, TX
03/02/2013; 5:00 pm	at No. 25 Louisiana Tech	L 61–88	9–18 (3–13)	Thomas Assembly Center (4,850); Ruston, LA
03/07/2013; 7:00 pm	UTSA			Event Center Arena; San Jose, CA
03/09/2013; 7:00 pm	Texas State	L 67–90	9–19 (3–14)	Event Center Arena (2,087); San Jose, CA
WAC tournament
03/12/2013; 8:30 pm	vs. UTSA; First Round	L 49–67	9–20	Orleans Arena (N/A); Paradise, NV
*Non-conference game. ^{#}Rankings from AP Poll. (#) Tournament seedings in parentheses. All times are in Pacific Time.

March 7's game vs UTSA was canceled due to a leak in the roof at The Events Center Arena. The game was not made up.
