= 2012–13 Seattle Redhawks men's basketball team =

American college basketball season

2012–13 Seattle Redhawks men's basketball
- Conference: Western Athletic Conference
- Record: 8–22 (3–15 WAC)
- Head coach: Cameron Dollar (4th season)
- Assistant coaches: Donald Dollar; Amadou "Pape" Koundoul; Darren Talley
- Home arena: KeyArena

2012–13 WAC men's basketball standings
	Conf.				Overall
Team	W		L	PCT	W		L	PCT
Louisiana Tech*	16	–	2	.889	27	–	7	.794
Denver	16	–	2	.889	22	–	10	.688
New Mexico State †	14	–	4	.778	24	–	11	.686
Utah State	11	–	7	.611	21	–	10	.677
Texas–Arlington	11	–	7	.611	19	–	14	.576
Idaho	7	–	11	.389	12	–	18	.400
Texas State	5	–	13	.278	12	–	22	.353
UTSA	3	–	14	.176	10	–	22	.313
San Jose State	3	–	14	.176	9	–	20	.310
Seattle	3	–	15	.167	8	–	22	.267
† 2013 WAC tournament winner As of March 25, 2013 * WAC Tournament #1 seed Rankings from AP Poll

The 2012–13 Seattle Redhawks men's basketball team represented Seattle University during the 2012–13 NCAA Division I men's basketball season. The Redhawks, led by fourth year head coach Cameron Dollar, played their home games at KeyArena, with one home game at the ShoWare Center, and were first year members of the Western Athletic Conference. They finished the season 8–22, 3–15 in WAC play to finish in last place. They lost in the first round of the WAC tournament to Texas State.

== Roster ==
#	Name	Height	Weight (lbs.)	Position	Class	Hometown
0	Prince Obasi	6'2"	205	G	Sr.	Reseda, CA
1	Allen Tate	6'5"	205	G	Sr.	Hobbs, NM
2	Emerson Murray	6'3"	195	G	Jr.	Vancouver, BC
5	D'Vonne Pickett	6'0"	195	G	Jr.	Seattle, WA
10	Sterling Carter	6'0"	200	G	Jr.	Seattle, WA
11	Deshaun Sunderhaus	6'9"	215	F	RS Fr.	Rockdale Co., GA
12	Clarence Trent	6'6"	225	F	RS Jr.	Tacoma, WA
13	Louis Green	6'9"	240	C	Sr.	Westchester, IL
14	Emmanuel Chibuogwu	6'6"	185	G	Fr.	Shoreline, WA
15	Chad Rasmussen	6'7"	200	F	Sr.	University Place, WA
24	Jack Crook	6'11"	255	C	Fr.	Manchester, England
25	David Trimble	6'1"	185	G	Fr.	Yakima, WA
30	Isiah Umipig	6'0"	195	G	Jr.	Federal Way, WA
31	T.J. Diop	6'8"	215	F	Sr.	Queensland, Australia
33	Luiz Bidart	6'0"	195	F	RS Fr.	São Paulo, Brazil
35	Jarell Flora	6'3"	180	G	RS So.	Bremerton, WA

== Schedule ==
Date time, TV	Rank^{#}	Opponent^{#}	Result	Record	Site (attendance) city, state
Exhibition
11/07/2012*; 7:00 pm		Evergreen State	W 117–34	–	KeyArena (1,837); Seattle, WA
Regular season
11/11/2012*; 6:00 pm, RTNW		Montana State; Elgin Baylor Classic	W 87–72	1–0	KeyArena (2,750); Seattle, WA
11/17/2012*; 1:00 pm, ESPN3		at Virginia	L 43–83	1–1	John Paul Jones Arena (9,160); Charlottesville, VA
11/21/2012*; 7:00 pm		Pacific Lutheran	W 58–49	2–1	KeyArena (2,283); Seattle, WA
11/28/2012*; 7:00 pm, P12N		at Stanford	L 57–68	2–2	Maples Pavilion (4,381); Stanford, CA
12/02/2012*; 2:00 pm		Boise State	L 64–87	2–3	KeyArena (2,182); Seattle, WA
12/10/2012*; 6:05 pm		at Eastern Washington	W 75–69	3–3	Reese Court (712); Cheney, WA
12/13/2012*; 7:00 pm, RTNW		Washington	L 74–87	3–4	KeyArena (6,137); Seattle, WA
12/17/2012*; 7:00 pm		Jackson State	L 82–91	3–5	KeyArena (1,907); Seattle, WA
12/19/2012*; 7:00 pm		Northern Illinois	W 75–48	4–5	KeyArena (2,362); Seattle, WA
12/22/2012*; 7:00 pm		Campbell	W 72–49	5–5	KeyArena (1,911); Seattle, WA
12/29/2012; 7:00 pm, RTNW		Idaho	L 64–71	5–6 (0–1)	KeyArena (2,715); Seattle, WA
01/03/2013; 6:05 pm, ESPN3		at Utah State	L 66–75	5–7 (0–2)	Smith Spectrum (6,116); Logan, UT
01/05/2013; 7:00 pm		at San Jose State	L 71–76	5–8 (0–3)	Event Center Arena (1,081); San Jose, CA
01/10/2013; 7:00 pm, RTNW		New Mexico State	L 82–83 ^{2OT}	5–9 (0–4)	KeyArena (2,273); Seattle, WA
01/12/2013; 3:30 pm, RTNW		Denver	L 51–64	5–10 (0–5)	KeyArena (3,149); Seattle, WA
01/17/2013; 5:00 pm		at Texas–Arlington	W 61–44	6–10 (1–5)	College Park Center (1,082); Arlington, TX
01/19/2013; 5:00 pm		at Louisiana Tech	L 71–78	6–11 (1–6)	Thomas Assembly Center (3,974); Ruston, LA
01/24/2013; 7:00 pm, RTNW		UTSA	L 75–78	6–12 (1–7)	KeyArena (2,328); Seattle, WA
01/26/2013; 7:00 pm		Texas State	L 83–86	6–13 (1–8)	KeyArena (2,580); Seattle, WA
01/31/2013; 7:00 pm		San Jose State	W 56–48	7–13 (2–8)	KeyArena (2,052); Seattle, WA
02/02/2013; 7:00 pm, RTNW		Utah State	L 46–68	7–14 (2–9)	KeyArena (3,270); Seattle, WA
02/07/2013; 6:00 pm, RTNW		at Denver	L 55–72	7–15 (2–10)	Magness Arena (1,770); Denver, CO
02/09/2013; 6:00 pm, ESPN3		at New Mexico State	L 57–60	7–16 (2–11)	Pan American Center (6,219); Las Cruces, NM
02/14/2013; 7:00 pm		Louisiana Tech	L 58–64	7–17 (2–12)	KeyArena (2,208); Seattle, WA
02/16/2013; 7:00 pm		Texas–Arlington	L 63–65	7–18 (2–13)	KeyArena (3,502); Seattle, WA
02/28/2013; 5:00 pm		at Texas State	L 65–67	7–19 (2–14)	Strahan Coliseum (1,524); San Marcos, TX
03/02/2013; 4:00 pm		at UTSA	W 53–37	8–19 (3–14)	Convocation Center (1,454); San Antonio, TX
03/06/2013*; 7:00 pm		Cal State Bakersfield	L 74–75 ^{OT}	8–20	ShoWare Center (1,052); Kent, WA
03/09/2013; 7:05 pm		at Idaho	L 72–76	8–21 (3–15)	Cowan Spectrum (1,498); Moscow, ID
2013 WAC tournament
03/12/2013; 6:00 pm		vs. Texas State; First Round	L 56–68	8–22	Orleans Arena (N/A); Paradise, NV
*Non-conference game. ^{#}Rankings from AP Poll. (#) Tournament seedings in parentheses. All times are in Pacific Time.
