= 2012–13 Louisiana Tech Bulldogs basketball team =

American college basketball season

2012–13 Louisiana Tech Bulldogs men's basketball

WAC Regular Season Co–Champions

NIT, Second Round
- Conference: Western Athletic Conference
- Record: 27–7 (16–2 WAC)
- Head coach: Michael White (2nd season)
- Assistant coaches: Isaac Brown; Dusty May; Derrick Jones
- Home arena: Thomas Assembly Center

2012–13 WAC men's basketball standings
	Conf.				Overall
Team	W		L	PCT	W		L	PCT
Louisiana Tech*	16	–	2	.889	27	–	7	.794
Denver	16	–	2	.889	22	–	10	.688
New Mexico State †	14	–	4	.778	24	–	11	.686
Utah State	11	–	7	.611	21	–	10	.677
Texas–Arlington	11	–	7	.611	19	–	14	.576
Idaho	7	–	11	.389	12	–	18	.400
Texas State	5	–	13	.278	12	–	22	.353
UTSA	3	–	14	.176	10	–	22	.313
San Jose State	3	–	14	.176	9	–	20	.310
Seattle	3	–	15	.167	8	–	22	.267
† 2013 WAC tournament winner As of March 25, 2013 * WAC Tournament #1 seed Rankings from AP Poll

The 2012–13 Louisiana Tech Bulldogs basketball team represented Louisiana Tech University during the 2012–13 NCAA Division I men's basketball season. The Bulldogs, led by second year head coach Michael White, played their home games at the Thomas Assembly Center and were members of the Western Athletic Conference. This was their last season as a member of the WAC as they joined Conference USA in July 2013.

== Roster ==
2012–13 Louisiana Tech Bulldogs men's basketball team
Players
Coaches

Pos.	#	Name	Height	Weight	Year	Hometown
G	0	Alex Hamilton	6 ft 4 in (1.93 m)	180 lb (82 kg)	Fr	Chipley, FL
F	1	Michale Kyser	6 ft 9 in (2.06 m)	210 lb (95 kg)	So	Lancaster, TX
G	2	Brandon Gibson	6 ft 5 in (1.96 m)	225 lb (102 kg)	RS Sr	Marianna, FL
G	3	Raheem Appleby	6 ft 3 in (1.91 m)	160 lb (73 kg)	So	Jacksonville, AR
G	4	Speedy Smith	6 ft 3 in (1.91 m)	185 lb (84 kg)	So	St. Petersburg, FL
F	5	Chris Anderson	6 ft 6 in (1.98 m)	220 lb (100 kg)	Jr	Muskegon, MI
F	10	Isaiah Massey	6 ft 8 in (2.03 m)	230 lb (104 kg)	RS So	McDonough, GA
F	11	Stojan Gjuroski	6 ft 8 in (2.03 m)	205 lb (93 kg)	RS So	Gostivar, Macedonia
G	13	J.D. Wilkerson (W)	5 ft 11 in (1.8 m)	165 lb (75 kg)	Fr	Baton Rouge, LA
G	15	Cordarius Johnson	6 ft 5 in (1.96 m)	215 lb (98 kg)	Jr	Coushatta, LA
G	21	Kenyon McNeail	6 ft 1 in (1.85 m)	185 lb (84 kg)	Jr	Conway, AR
G	22	Demario Johnson (W)	5 ft 11 in (1.8 m)	175 lb (79 kg)	Jr	Shreveport, LA
G	23	Jaron Johnson	6 ft 6 in (1.98 m)	205 lb (93 kg)	Jr	Tyler, TX
F/C	25	J.L. Lewis	6 ft 8 in (2.03 m)	240 lb (109 kg)	Sr	Gonzales, LA
F/C	40	Gilbert Talbot	6 ft 10 in (2.08 m)	255 lb (116 kg)	Fr	Houma, LA

Head coach

- Michael White (Mississippi)

Assistant coach(es)

- Isaac Brown (Louisiana–Monroe)
- Dusty May (Indiana)
- Derrick Jones (Samford)

Legend

- (C) Team captain
- (S) Suspended
- (I) Ineligible
- (W) Walk-on
- Injured
- Current redshirt

Roster
Last update: 2013-02-08

== Schedule ==
Date time, TV	Rank^{#}	Opponent^{#}	Result	Record	Site (attendance) city, state
Exhibition
October 25, 2012*; 7:00 pm		Arkansas–Monticello	W 72–44		Thomas Assembly Center; Ruston, LA
November 2, 2012*; 7:30 pm		Southern Arkansas	W 66–55		Thomas Assembly Center; Ruston, LA
Regular season
November 9, 2012*; 8:00 pm, FSMW/FSS/FSSW/SunS		at Texas A&M; CBE Hall of Fame Classic	L 59–71	0–1	Reed Arena (5,066); College Station, TX
November 14, 2012*; 7:00 pm		Arkansas–Little Rock	W 70–52	1–1	Thomas Assembly Center (2,465); Ruston, LA
November 18, 2012*; 4:00 pm		vs. Troy; CBE Hall of Fame Classic	W 70–46	2–1	McKenzie Arena (2,524); Chattanooga, TN
November 19, 2012*; 6:00 pm		vs. Southeast Missouri State; CBE Hall of Fame Classic	W 67–63	3–1	McKenzie Arena (2,457); Chattanooga, TN
November 20, 2012*; 6:00 pm		at Chattanooga; CBE Hall of Fame Classic	W 71–63	4–1	McKenzie Arena (2,395); Chattanooga, TN
November 24, 2012*; 7:00 pm		Louisiana–Monroe	W 68–52	5–1	Thomas Assembly Center (2,308); Ruston, LA
November 28, 2012*; 7:00 pm		Southeastern Louisiana	W 99–62	6–1	Thomas Assembly Center (2,537); Ruston, LA
November 30, 2012*; 7:00 pm		at Georgia State	W 86–68	7–1	GSU Sports Arena (2,015); Atlanta, GA
December 4, 2012*; 7:30 pm		at Northwestern State	L 83–89	7–2	Prather Coliseum (2,703); Natchitoches, LA
December 8, 2012*; 7:00 pm		Southern Miss	W 65–55	8–2	Thomas Assembly Center (2,575); Ruston, LA
December 12, 2012*; 7:00 pm		at McNeese State	L 72–80	8–3	Sudduth Coliseum (726); Lake Charles, LA
December 17, 2012*; 7:00 pm		at Arkansas–Little Rock	W 75–73	9–3	Jack Stephens Center (3,734); Little Rock, AR
December 29, 2012; 7:00 pm, ALT2/CST/ESPN3/MASN2		Denver	W 68–60	10–3 (1–0)	Thomas Assembly Center (2,295); Ruston, LA
December 31, 2012; 7:00 pm		New Mexico State	W 81–72	11–3 (2–0)	Thomas Assembly Center (2,129); Ruston, LA
January 5, 2013; 7:00 pm		at Texas–Arlington	W 55–52	12–3 (3–0)	College Park Center (1,276); Arlington, TX
January 10, 2013; 7:00 pm		at Texas State	W 84–67	13–3 (4–0)	Strahan Coliseum (1,011); San Marcos, TX
January 12, 2013; 6:00 pm		at UTSA	W 73–71	14–3 (5–0)	Convocation Center (1,203); San Antonio, TX
January 17, 2013; 6:00 pm, ALT2/CST/ESPN3/MASN2		Idaho	W 72–66	15–3 (6–0)	Thomas Assembly Center (3,545); Ruston, LA
January 19, 2013; 7:00 pm		Seattle	W 78–71	16–3 (7–0)	Thomas Assembly Center (3,974); Ruston, LA
January 24, 2013; 9:00 pm		at San Jose State	W 76–54	17–3 (8–0)	Event Center Arena (2,624); San Jose, CA
January 26, 2013; 8:05 pm, ESPN3/KMYU		at Utah State	W 51–48	18–3 (9–0)	Smith Spectrum (8,530); Logan, UT
February 2, 2013; 7:00 pm		Texas–Arlington	W 64–51	19–3 (10–0)	Thomas Assembly Center (5,024); Ruston, LA
February 7, 2013; 7:00 pm		UTSA	W 74–49	20–3 (11–0)	Thomas Assembly Center (4,061); Ruston, LA
February 9, 2013; 7:00 pm		Texas State	W 84–69	21–3 (12–0)	Thomas Assembly Center (4,435); Ruston, LA
February 14, 2013; 9:00 pm		at Seattle	W 64–58	22–3 (13–0)	KeyArena (2,208); Seattle, WA
February 16, 2013; 9:05 pm		at Idaho	W 67–61	23–3 (14–0)	Cowan Spectrum (1,132); Moscow, ID
February 20, 2013*; 7:00 pm		Central Baptist	W 118–48	24–3	Thomas Assembly Center (3,735); Ruston, LA
February 28, 2013; 7:00 pm, ALT2/CST/ESPN3/MASN	No. 25	Utah State	W 84–61	25–3 (15–0)	Thomas Assembly Center (5,506); Ruston, LA
March 2, 2013; 7:00 pm	No. 25	San Jose State	W 88–61	26–3 (16–0)	Thomas Assembly Center (4,850); Ruston, LA
March 7, 2013; 8:00 pm, AggieVision/ALT2/CSNH/ESPN3		at New Mexico State	L 60–78	26–4 (16–1)	Pan American Center (6,941); Las Cruces, NM
March 9, 2013; 6:00 pm, RSRM		at Denver	L 54–78	26–5 (16–2)	Magness Arena (5,119); Denver, CO
WAC tournament
March 14, 2013; 8:00 pm		vs. UTSA; Quarterfinals	L 67–73	26–6	Orleans Arena (N/A); Paradise, NV
NIT
March 19, 2013*; 6:15 pm, ESPN3	No. (5)	at No. (4) Florida State; First Round	W 71–66	27–6	Donald L. Tucker Center (2,989); Tallahassee, FL
March 25, 2013*; 9:00 pm, ESPNU	No. (5)	at No. (1) Southern Miss; Second Round	L 52–63	27–7	Reed Green Coliseum (5,922); Hattiesburg, MS
*Non-conference game. ^{#}Rankings from AP Poll. (#) Tournament seedings in parentheses. All times are in Central Time.

== Rankings ==
Ranking movements Legend: ██ Increase in ranking ██ Decrease in ranking — = Not ranked RV = Received votes
	Week																			
Poll	Pre	1	2	3	4	5	6	7	8	9	10	11	12	13	14	15	16	17	18	Final
AP Poll	—	—	—	—	—	—	—	—	—	—	—	RV	RV	RV	RV	RV	25	RV	—	—
Coaches' Poll	—	—	—	—	—	—	—	—	—	—	—	—	RV	RV	RV	RV	RV	RV	—	—
