= 2012–13 Utah State Aggies men's basketball team =

American college basketball season

2012–13 Utah State Aggies men's basketball
- Conference: Western Athletic Conference
- Record: 21–10 (11–7 WAC)
- Head coach: Stew Morrill (15th season)
- Assistant coaches: Tim Duryea; Chris Jones; Tarvish Felton
- Home arena: Smith Spectrum

2012–13 WAC men's basketball standings
	Conf.				Overall
Team	W		L	PCT	W		L	PCT
Louisiana Tech*	16	–	2	.889	27	–	7	.794
Denver	16	–	2	.889	22	–	10	.688
New Mexico State †	14	–	4	.778	24	–	11	.686
Utah State	11	–	7	.611	21	–	10	.677
Texas–Arlington	11	–	7	.611	19	–	14	.576
Idaho	7	–	11	.389	12	–	18	.400
Texas State	5	–	13	.278	12	–	22	.353
UTSA	3	–	14	.176	10	–	22	.313
San Jose State	3	–	14	.176	9	–	20	.310
Seattle	3	–	15	.167	8	–	22	.267
† 2013 WAC tournament winner As of March 25, 2013 * WAC Tournament #1 seed Rankings from AP Poll

The 2012–13 Utah State Aggies men's basketball team represented Utah State University in the 2012–13 college basketball season. This was head coach Stew Morrill's fifteenth season at Utah State. The Aggies played their home games at the Smith Spectrum and were in their final year as members of the Western Athletic Conference. In July 2013, the Aggies will become full members of the Mountain West Conference. They finished the season 21–10, 11–7 in WAC play to finish in a tie for fourth place. They lost in the quarterfinals of the WAC tournament to Texas–Arlington. With over 20 wins, they Aggies would have been considered to participate in the CBI or CIT. However, citing injuries, the Aggies chose not to play in a postseason tournament ending a streak of 13 straight postseason appearances.

== Roster ==
2012–13 Utah State Aggies men's basketball team
Players
Coaches

Pos.	#	Name	Height	Weight	Year	Previous school	Hometown
G	0	Marcel Davis	6 ft 2 in (1.88 m)	180 lb (82 kg)	Fr	American Fork	American Fork, UT
F	1	Ben Clifford	6 ft 7 in (2.01 m)	220 lb (100 kg)	RS So	Bingham	South Jordan, UT
G/F	2	Quinn Taylor	6 ft 6 in (1.98 m)	170 lb (77 kg)	Fr	Langham Creek	Houston, TX
C	4	Matt Lopez	6 ft 11 in (2.11 m)	245 lb (111 kg)	So	Washington Township; La Salle	Erial, NJ
F/C	5	Jarred Shaw	6 ft 10 in (2.08 m)	235 lb (107 kg)	Jr	Carter; Oklahoma State	Dallas, TX
G/F	12	Danny Berger (injured)	6 ft 6 in (1.98 m)	205 lb (93 kg)	Jr	North Medford; Chemeketa Community College	Medford, OR
G	13	Preston Medlin	6 ft 4 in (1.93 m)	175 lb (79 kg)	RS Jr	Hebron	Carrollton, TX
F	15	Marvin Jean	6 ft 4 in (1.93 m)	190 lb (86 kg)	Jr	Mount Zion Christian Academy; Sullivan CC	Harriman, NY
G	20	TeNale Roland	6 ft 1 in (1.85 m)	170 lb (77 kg)	Jr	New Albany; Rend Lake College	Louisville, KY
G/F	21	Spencer Butterfield	6 ft 3 in (1.91 m)	225 lb (102 kg)	Jr	Del Oro; Yuba CC	Loomis, CA
G	24	Riley Bradshaw	6 ft 2 in (1.88 m)	180 lb (82 kg)	Fr	Corvallis	Corvallis, MT
C	25	Jordan Stone	6 ft 10 in (2.08 m)	270 lb (122 kg)	So	Sky View	Smithfield, UT
F	30	Sean Harris	6 ft 7 in (2.01 m)	220 lb (100 kg)	Jr	Rocklin; Yuba CC	Rocklin, CA
G/F	32	Quincy Barr	6 ft 5 in (1.96 m)	180 lb (82 kg)	Fr	American Fork	American Fork, UT
G	34	Kyisean Reed	6 ft 6 in (1.98 m)	215 lb (98 kg)	Sr	Highland; Antelope Valley College	Palmdale, CA

Head coach

- Stew Morrill (Ricks College;
  Gonzaga)

Assistant coach(es)

- Tim Duryea (North Texas)
- Chris Jones (Utah)
- Tarvish Felton (Southern Utah University)

Legend

- (C) Team captain
- (S) Suspended
- (I) Ineligible
- (W) Walk-on
- Injured
- Current redshirt

== Schedule ==
Date time, TV	Rank^{#}	Opponent^{#}	Result	Record	Site (attendance) city, state
Exhibition
10/26/2012*; 7:00 pm		Grand Canyon	W 76–44	–	Smith Spectrum (N/A); Logan, UT
11/03/2012*; 7:00 pm		Simon Fraser	W 92–56	–	Smith Spectrum (7,974); Logan, UT
Regular season
11/10/2012*; 7:00 pm, KMYU		Idaho State	W 56–48	1–0	Smith Spectrum (9,607); Logan, UT
11/15/2012*; 7:00 pm, KMYU		Saint Mary's	L 58–67	1–1	Smith Spectrum (9,077); Logan, UT
11/17/2012*; 7:00 pm		Texas A&M-Corpus Christi	W 77–68	2–1	Smith Spectrum (9,673); Logan, UT
11/24/2012*; 7:00 pm, KMYU/ESPN3		Weber State; Old Oquirrh Bucket	W 65–55	3–1	Smith Spectrum (8,415); Logan, UT
11/28/2012*; 8:00 pm		at Santa Clara	W 80–78 ^{OT}	4–1	Leavey Center (1,442); Santa Clara, CA
12/08/2012*; 7:00 pm		Western Oregon	W 86–57	5–1	Smith Spectrum (8,533); Logan, UT
12/15/2012*; 7:05 pm, FCS Pacific/KMYU		at Utah Valley; Old Oquirhh Bucket	W 69–63	6–1	UCCU Center (4,033); Orem, UT
12/20/2012*; 8:05 pm		Nicholls State; World Vision Classic	W 79–72	7–1	Smith Spectrum (7,731); Logan, UT
12/21/2012*; 8:05 pm		UC Davis; World Vision Classic	W 73–61	8–1	Smith Spectrum (7,781); Logan, UT
12/22/2012*; 8:05 pm		Southern Illinois; World Vision Classic	W 70–58	9–1	Smith Spectrum (7,919); Logan, UT
12/29/2012; 5:00 pm		at UTSA	W 71–67	10–1 (1–0)	Convocation Center (1,077); San Antonio, TX
12/31/2012; 3:00 pm		at Texas State	W 81–57	11–1 (2–0)	Strahan Coliseum (1,165); San Marcos, TX
01/03/2013; 7:05 pm, KMYU/ESPN3		Seattle	W 75–66	12–1 (3–0)	Smith Spectrum (6,116); Logan, UT
01/05/2013; 7:05 pm, KMYU/ESPN3		Idaho	W 82–75 ^{OT}	13–1 (4–0)	Smith Spectrum (6,982); Logan, UT
01/11/2013; 7:05 pm, KMYU/ESPN3		San Jose State	W 66–60	14–1 (5–0)	Smith Spectrum (9,191); Logan, UT
01/17/2013; 7:00 pm, KMYU/ESPN3		at New Mexico State	L 51–64	14–2 (5–1)	Pan American Center (7,119); Las Cruces, NM
01/19/2013; 4:30 pm, RTRM		at Denver	L 57–68	14–3 (5–2)	Magness Arena (2,621); Denver, CO
01/24/2013; 7:05 pm, KMYU/ESPN3		Texas–Arlington	L 68–74	14–4 (5–3)	Smith Spectrum (7,229); Logan, UT
01/26/2013; 7:05 pm, KMYU/ESPN3		Louisiana Tech	L 48–51	14–5 (5–4)	Smith Spectrum (8,530); Logan, UT
01/31/2013; 8:00 pm, ESPN3		at Idaho	W 77–67	15–5 (6–4)	Cowan Spectrum (1,190); Moscow, ID
02/02/2013; 8:00 pm, KMYU/RTRM		at Seattle	W 68–46	16–5 (7–4)	KeyArena (3,270); Seattle, WA
02/08/2013; 8:00 pm		at San Jose State	W 63–36	17–5 (8–4)	The Event Center Arena (1,876); San Jose, CA
02/14/2013; 7:05 pm, KMYU/ESPN3		Denver	L 60–63 ^{OT}	17–6 (8–5)	Smith Spectrum (6,978); Logan, UT
02/16/2013; 9:00 pm, ESPNU		New Mexico State	W 73–69	18–6 (9–5)	Smith Spectrum (7,646); Logan, UT
02/19/2013*; 7:00 pm, BYUtv		at BYU; Old Oquirhh Bucket	L 68–70	18–7	Marriott Center (16,569); Provo, UT
02/23/2013*; 7:00 pm		Illinois State; BracketBusters	W 80–71	19–7	Smith Spectrum (7,348); Logan, UT
02/28/2013; 6:00 pm, ESPN3		at No. 25 Louisiana Tech	L 61–84	19–8 (9–6)	Thomas Assembly Center (5,506); Ruston, LA
03/02/2013; 6:00 pm		at Texas–Arlington	L 46–61	19–9 (9–7)	College Park Center (4,837); Arlington, TX
03/07/2013; 7:05 pm, KMYU/ESPN3		Texas State	W 77–61	20–9 (10–7)	Smith Spectrum (7,123); Logan, UT
03/09/2013; 7:05 pm, KMYU/ESPN3		UTSA	W 71–51	21–9 (11–7)	Smith Spectrum (6,984); Logan, UT
WAC tournament
03/14/2013; 9:30 pm		vs. Texas–Arlington; Quarterfinals	L 78–83	21–10	Orleans Arena (N/A); Las Vegas, NV
*Non-conference game. ^{#}Rankings from AP Poll. (#) Tournament seedings in parentheses. All times are in Mountain Time.
