= 2012–13 Idaho Vandals men's basketball team =

American college basketball season

2012–13 Idaho Vandals men's basketball
- Conference: Western Athletic Conference
- Record: 12–18 (7–11 WAC)
- Head coach: Don Verlin (5th season)
- Assistant coaches: Mike Freeman; Chris Helbling; Tim Murphy
- Home arena: Cowan Spectrum, Memorial Gym

2012–13 WAC men's basketball standings
	Conf.				Overall
Team	W		L	PCT	W		L	PCT
Louisiana Tech*	16	–	2	.889	27	–	7	.794
Denver	16	–	2	.889	22	–	10	.688
New Mexico State †	14	–	4	.778	24	–	11	.686
Utah State	11	–	7	.611	21	–	10	.677
Texas–Arlington	11	–	7	.611	19	–	14	.576
Idaho	7	–	11	.389	12	–	18	.400
Texas State	5	–	13	.278	12	–	22	.353
UTSA	3	–	14	.176	10	–	22	.313
San Jose State	3	–	14	.176	9	–	20	.310
Seattle	3	–	15	.167	8	–	22	.267
† 2013 WAC tournament winner As of March 25, 2013 * WAC Tournament #1 seed Rankings from AP Poll

The 2012–13 Idaho Vandals men's basketball team represented the University of Idaho during the 2012–13 NCAA Division I men's basketball season. The Vandals, led by fifth year head coach Don Verlin, played their home games at the Cowan Spectrum, with a few early season games at Memorial Gym, and were members of the Western Athletic Conference. they finished the season 12–18, 7–11 in WAC play to finish in sixth place. They lost in the quarterfinals of the WAC tournament to New Mexico State.

== Roster ==
Number	Name	Position	Height	Weight	Year	Hometown
0	Robert Harris	Guard	5–11	185	Junior	Kent, Washington
3	Mansa Habeeb	Guard	6–3	220	Senior	Buffalo, New York
5	Connor Hill	Guard	6–2	190	Sophomore	Post Falls, Idaho
10	Denzel Douglas	Guard	5–11	180	Junior	Los Angeles, California
12	Mike McChristian	Guard	6–2	200	Senior	Vacaville, California
20	Matt Borton	Guard	6–5	180	Sophomore	Yakima, Washington
21	Antwan Scott	Guard	6–1	170	Junior	Wylie, Texas
24	Marcus Bell	Forward	6–8	230	Junior	Modesto, California
33	Kyle Barone	Center	6–10	220	Senior	Garden Grove, California
34	Stephen Madison	Forward	6–5	210	Junior	Portland, Oregon
41	Ty Egbert	Forward	6–8	200	Freshman	Coulee Dam, Washington
42	Joe Kammerer	Center	6–9	241	Junior	Eugene, Oregon
45	Wendell Faines	Forward	6–8	245	Senior	Lincoln, Nebraska

== Schedule ==
Date time, TV	Rank^{#}	Opponent^{#}	Result	Record	Site (attendance) city, state
Exhibition
10/27/2012*; 7:00 pm		Seattle Pacific	W 77–71	–	Memorial Gym (975); Moscow, ID
11/02/2012*; 8:00 pm		Central Washington	W 92–75	–	Memorial Gym (1,133); Moscow, ID
Regular Season
11/09/2012*; 7:00 pm		Wright State	L 70–80	0–1	Memorial Gym (1,303); Moscow, ID
11/17/2012*; 7:00 pm		Montana	L 63–66	0–2	Memorial Gym (1,254); Moscow, ID
11/20/2012*; 7:00 pm		Green Bay	W 72–62	1–2	Memorial Gym (762); Moscow, ID
11/23/2012*; 7:30 pm		at New Mexico	L 58–73	1–3	The Pit (14,741); Albuquerque, NM
11/28/2012*; 7:00 pm, Pac-12		at Washington State	L 55–64	1–4	Beasley Coliseum (4,791); Pullman, WA
12/01/2012*; 7:00 pm		UC Davis	W 73–66	2–4	Cowan Spectrum (935); Moscow, ID
12/06/2012*; 6:00 pm		at Eastern Washington	W 81–79 ^{OT}	3–4	Reese Court (1,107); Cheney, WA
12/08/2012*; 6:00 pm		at UTEP	L 60–64	3–5	Don Haskins Center (8,039); El Paso, TX
12/15/2012*; 7:05 pm		Walla Walla	W 91–47	4–5	Cowan Spectrum (908); Moscow, ID
12/20/2012*; 6:00 pm, RTRM		vs. Boise State	L 68–78	4–6	CenturyLink Arena (5,548); Boise, ID
12/29/2012; 7:00 pm, RTNW		at Seattle	W 71–64	5–6 (1–0)	KeyArena (2,715); Seattle, WA
01/03/2013; 7:00 pm		at San Jose State	W 64–55	6–6 (2–0)	Event Center Arena (1,144); San Jose, CA
01/05/2013; 6:05 pm, ESPN3		at Utah State	L 75–82 ^{OT}	6–7 (2–1)	Smith Spectrum (6,982); Logan, UT
01/10/2013; 7:05 pm		Denver	L 49–55	6–8 (2–2)	Cowan Spectrum (1,127); Moscow, ID
01/12/2013; 7:05 pm		New Mexico State	L 70–71	6–9 (2–3)	Cowan Spectrum (998); Moscow, ID
01/17/2013; 4:00 pm, ESPN3		at Louisiana Tech	L 66–72	6–10 (2–4)	Thomas Assembly Center (3,545); Ruston, LA
01/19/2013; 5:00 pm		at Texas–Arlington	W 77–64	7–10 (3–4)	College Park Center (1,424); Arlington, TX
01/24/2013; 7:05 pm		Texas State	L 73–78	7–11 (3–5)	Cowan Spectrum (1,279); Moscow, ID
01/26/2013; 7:05 pm		UTSA	W 74–70	8–11 (4–5)	Cowan Spectrum (1,139); Moscow, ID
01/31/2013; 7:00 pm, ESPN3		Utah State	L 67–77	8–12 (4–6)	Cowan Spectrum (1,190); Moscow, ID
02/02/2013; 7:05 pm		San Jose State	W 66–63	9–12 (5–6)	Cowan Spectrum (950); Moscow, ID
02/07/2013; 6:00 pm, ESPN3		at New Mexico State	L 74–76	9–13 (5–7)	Pan American Center (5,675); Las Cruces, NM
02/09/2013; 3:00 pm, RTRM		at Denver	L 58–74	9–14 (5–8)	Magness Arena (5,257); Denver, CO
02/14/2013; 7:05 pm		Texas–Arlington	L 68–71	9–15 (5–9)	Cowan Spectrum (883); Moscow, ID
02/16/2013; 7:05 pm		Louisiana Tech	L 61–67	9–16 (5–10)	Cowan Spectrum (1,132); Moscow, ID
02/23/2013*; 1:00 pm		at Idaho State; BracketBusters	W 75–69	10–16	Reed Gym (1,795); Pocatello, ID
02/28/2013; 5:00 pm		at UTSA	L 56–74	10–17 (5–11)	Convocation Center (1,444); San Antonio, TX
03/02/2013; 12:00 pm		at Texas State	W 90–81	11–17 (6–11)	Strahan Coliseum (1,585); San Marcos, TX
03/09/2013; 7:05 pm		Seattle	W 76–72	12–17 (7–11)	Cowan Spectrum (1,498); Moscow, ID
WAC tournament
03/14/2013; 12:00 pm		vs. New Mexico State; Quarterfinals	L 49–65	12–18	Orleans Arena (N/A); Paradise, NV
*Non-conference game. ^{#}Rankings from AP Poll. (#) Tournament seedings in parentheses. All times are in Pacific Time.
