= 2012–13 Texas–Arlington Mavericks men's basketball team =

American college basketball season

2012–13 Texas–Arlington Mavericks men's basketball

CIT, First Round
- Conference: Western Athletic Conference
- Record: 19–14 (11–7 WAC)
- Head coach: Scott Cross (7th season)
- Assistant coaches: Greg Young; Andrae Patterson; Zak Buncik
- Home arena: College Park Center

2012–13 WAC men's basketball standings
	Conf.				Overall
Team	W		L	PCT	W		L	PCT
Louisiana Tech*	16	–	2	.889	27	–	7	.794
Denver	16	–	2	.889	22	–	10	.688
New Mexico State †	14	–	4	.778	24	–	11	.686
Utah State	11	–	7	.611	21	–	10	.677
Texas–Arlington	11	–	7	.611	19	–	14	.576
Idaho	7	–	11	.389	12	–	18	.400
Texas State	5	–	13	.278	12	–	22	.353
UTSA	3	–	14	.176	10	–	22	.313
San Jose State	3	–	14	.176	9	–	20	.310
Seattle	3	–	15	.167	8	–	22	.267
† 2013 WAC tournament winner As of March 25, 2013 * WAC Tournament #1 seed Rankings from AP Poll

The 2012–13 Texas–Arlington Mavericks men's basketball team represented the University of Texas at Arlington during the 2012–13 NCAA Division I men's basketball season. The Mavericks, led by seventh year head coach Scott Cross, played their home games at the College Park Center and were first year members of the Western Athletic Conference. This was their only season as a member of the WAC as they joined the Sun Belt Conference in July 2013. They finished the season 19–14, 11–7 in WAC play to finish in a tie for fourth place. They advanced to the championship game of the WAC tournament where they lost to New Mexico State. They were invited to the 2013 CIT where they lost in the first round to Oral Roberts.

== Roster ==
Number	Name	Position	Height	Weight	Year	Hometown
1	Reger Dowell	Guard	6–1	183	Junior	Duncanville, Texas
2	Luke Davis	Guard	6–1	154	Freshman	Lubbock, Texas
3	Jamel Outler	Guard	6–2	183	Sophomore	Houston, Texas
4	Drew Charles	Guard	6–2	193	Freshman	Azle, Texas
5	Stuart Lagerson	Center	7–0	220	Junior	Converse, Texas
12	Shaquille White-Miller	Guard	5–9	176	Junior	Port Arthur, Texas
13	Vincent Dillard	Forward	6–5	200	Junior	Sanford, Florida
15	Kyle McElvain	Guard	6–2	191	Junior	Arlington, Texas
21	Greg Gainey	Forward	6–5	212	Junior	Dayton, Ohio
24	Kevin Butler	Forward	6–5	214	Senior	Duncanville, Texas
25	Cameron Catlett	Guard	6–3	188	Senior	San Antonio, Texas
33	Karol Gruszecki	Forward	6–5	200	Senior	Łódź, Poland
35	Brandon Edwards	Forward	6–6	224	Junior	Fort Worth, Texas
42	Deon Rodgers	Forward	6–6	265	Freshman	Fort Worth, Texas
44	Vernell Blackman	Forward	6–5	202	Junior	Dallas, Texas
55	Jordan Reves	Forward	6–10	240	Senior	Jeffersontown, Kentucky

== Schedule ==
Date time, TV	Opponent	Result	Record	Site (attendance) city, state
Regular season
11/09/2012*; 8:00 pm	at Cal State Bakersfield	W 62–60	1–0	Icardo Center (1,257); Bakersfield, CA
11/16/2012*; 7:00 pm, FSSW+	Oklahoma	L 59–63	1–1	College Park Center (6,421); Arlington, TX
11/24/2012*; 7:00 pm	at Samford	W 65–58	2–1	Pete Hanna Center (417); Homewood, AL
11/28/2012*; 7:00 pm, KTXA	at North Texas	W 72–59	3–1	The Super Pit (4,832); Denton, TX
12/01/2012*; 7:00 pm, LHN	at Texas	L 54–70	3–2	Frank Erwin Center (3,926); Austin, TX
12/03/2012*; 7:00 pm	at Texas–Pan American	W 60–51	4–2	UTPA Fieldhouse (437); Edinburg, TX
12/13/2012*; 7:00 pm	Houston Baptist	W 81–47	5–2	College Park Center (1,259); Arlington, TX
12/19/2012*; 7:00 pm, FSSW+	at No. 24 Oklahoma State	L 44–69	5–3	Gallagher-Iba Arena (8,714); Stillwater, OK
12/29/2012; 7:00 pm	New Mexico State	W 68–47	6–3 (1–0)	College Park Center (1,518); Arlington, TX
12/31/2012; 2:00 pm	Denver	L 35–50	6–4 (1–1)	College Park Center (1,066); Arlington, TX
01/02/2013*; 7:00 pm	Boise State	L 46–64	6–5	College Park Center (1,107); Arlington, TX
01/05/2013; 7:00 pm	Louisiana Tech	L 52–55	6–6 (1–2)	College Park Center (1,276); Arlington, TX
01/10/2013; 7:00 pm	at UTSA	W 75–67	7–6 (2–2)	Convocation Center (1,094); San Antonio, TX
01/12/2013; 2:00 pm	at Texas State	W 91–74	8–6 (3–2)	Strahan Coliseum (1,055); San Marcos, TX
01/17/2013; 7:00 pm	Seattle	L 44–61	8–7 (3–3)	College Park Center (1,082); Arlington, TX
01/19/2013; 7:00 pm	Idaho	L 64–77	8–8 (3–4)	College Park Center (1,424); Arlington, TX
01/24/2013; 8:05 pm, ESPN3	at Utah State	W 74–68	9–8 (4–4)	Smith Spectrum (7,229); Logan, UT
01/26/2013; 9:00 pm	at San Jose State	W 66–47	10–8 (5–4)	Event Center Arena (1,027); San Jose, CA
02/02/2013; 7:00 pm	at Louisiana Tech	L 51–64	10–9 (5–5)	Thomas Assembly Center (5,024); Ruston, LA
02/07/2013; 7:00 pm	Texas State	W 75–50	11–9 (6–5)	College Park Center (2,053); Arlington, TX
02/09/2013; 7:00 pm	UTSA	W 68–63	12–9 (7–5)	College Park Center (2,112); Arlington, TX
02/14/2013; 9:05 pm	at Idaho	W 71–68	13–9 (8–5)	Cowan Spectrum (883); Moscow, ID
02/16/2013; 9:00 pm	at Seattle	W 65–63	14–9 (9–5)	KeyArena (3,502); Seattle, WA
02/20/2013*; 7:00 pm	Texas–Pan American	W 63–48	15–9	College Park Center (1,085); Arlington, TX
02/23/2013*; 5:00 pm	UC Irvine; BracketBusters	L 70–77	15–10	College Park Center (1,349); Arlington, TX
02/28/2013; 7:00 pm	San Jose State	W 81–74	16–10 (10–5)	College Park Center (1,308); Arlington, TX
03/02/2013; 7:00 pm	Utah State	W 61–46	17–10 (11–5)	College Park Center (4,837); Arlington, TX
03/07/2013; 8:00 pm	at Denver	L 55–84	17–11 (11–6)	Magness Arena (2,630); Denver, CO
03/09/2013; 8:00 pm, ESPN3	at New Mexico State	L 66–69	17–12 (11–7)	Pan American Center (6,849); Las Cruces, NM
WAC tournament
03/14/2013; 10:30 pm	vs. Utah State; Quarterfinals	W 83–78	18–12	Orleans Arena (N/A); Paradise, NV
03/15/2013; 10:30 pm	vs. UTSA; Semifinals	W 69–53	19–12	Orleans Arena (949); Paradise, NV
03/16/2013; 10:00 pm	vs. New Mexico State; Championship Game	L 55–64	19–13	Orleans Arena (N/A); Paradise, NV
2013 CIT
03/20/2013*; 7:30 pm	Oral Roberts; First Round	L 76–84	19–14	College Park Center (1,627); Arlington, TX
*Non-conference game. ^{#}Rankings from AP Poll. (#) Tournament seedings in parentheses. All times are in Central Time.
