= 2012–13 New Mexico State Aggies men's basketball team =

American college basketball season

2012–13 New Mexico State Aggies men's basketball

WAC tournament champions

NCAA Tournament, round of 64
- Conference: Western Athletic Conference
- Record: 24–11 (14–4 WAC)
- Head coach: Marvin Menzies (6th season)
- Assistant coaches: Paul Weir; Keith Brown; Tony Delk
- Home arena: Pan American Center

2012–13 WAC men's basketball standings
	Conf.				Overall
Team	W		L	PCT	W		L	PCT
Louisiana Tech*	16	–	2	.889	27	–	7	.794
Denver	16	–	2	.889	22	–	10	.688
New Mexico State †	14	–	4	.778	24	–	11	.686
Utah State	11	–	7	.611	21	–	10	.677
Texas–Arlington	11	–	7	.611	19	–	14	.576
Idaho	7	–	11	.389	12	–	18	.400
Texas State	5	–	13	.278	12	–	22	.353
UTSA	3	–	14	.176	10	–	22	.313
San Jose State	3	–	14	.176	9	–	20	.310
Seattle	3	–	15	.167	8	–	22	.267
† 2013 WAC tournament winner As of March 25, 2013 * WAC Tournament #1 seed Rankings from AP Poll

The 2012–13 New Mexico State Aggies men's basketball team represented New Mexico State University during the 2012–13 NCAA Division I men's basketball season. The Aggies, led by sixth year head coach Marvin Menzies, played their home games at the Pan American Center and were members of the Western Athletic Conference. They finished the season 24–11, 14–4 in WAC play to finish in third place. They were champions of the WAC tournament to earn the conferences automatic bid to the NCAA tournament where they lost in the second round to Saint Louis.

== Previous season ==
The Aggies finished the season 26–10, 10–4 in WAC play to finish in second place. They were champions of the WAC tournament to earn an automatic bid to the NCAA tournament. In their 20th NCAA Tournament appearance, they lost in the second round to Indiana.

== Departures ==
Name	Number	Pos.	Height	Weight	Year	Hometown	Notes
Christian Kabongo	1	G	6'4"	199	Sophomore	Toronto, ON	Transferred to Southern Miss
D.J. Lewis	5	G	6'0"	170	Freshman	New Orleans, LA	Transferred to Concordia College
Hernst Laroche	13	G	6'1"	170	Senior	Montreal, Quebec	Graduated
Wendell McKines	31	F	6'6"	230	Senior	Oakland, CA	Graduated
Hamidu Rahman	32	C	6'11"	245	Senior	Somerset, NJ	Graduated
Temjae Singleton		F	6'5"	210	RS-Freshman	Woodland Hills, CA	Transferred to Arizona Western

== Incoming transfers ==
Name	Number	Pos.	Height	Weight	Year	Hometown	Previous School
Kevin Aronis	5	G	6'3"	185	Junior	Sebastopol, CA	Junior college transfer from Santa Rosa JC

== 2012 Recruiting Class ==
College recruiting information
Name	Hometown	School	Height	Weight	Commit date
Sim Bhullar; C	Toronto, Ontario	Huntington Prep	7 ft 5 in (2.26 m)	355 lb (161 kg)	
Sim Bhullar; C	Recruit ratings: Rivals: 247Sports: (93)				
Matej Buovac; F	Zagreb, Croatia	La Lumiere	6 ft 7 in (2.01 m)	220 lb (100 kg)	
Matej Buovac; F	Recruit ratings: No ratings found				
Aaron Kubinski; F	Albuquerque, NM	La Cueva	6 ft 5 in (1.96 m)	195 lb (88 kg)	
Aaron Kubinski; F	Recruit ratings: No ratings found				
Overall recruit ranking:
Note: In many cases, Scout, Rivals, 247Sports, On3, and ESPN may conflict in their listings of height and weight.; In these cases, the average was taken. ESPN grades are on a 100-point scale.; Sources: "2015 New Mexico State Basketball Commits". ESPN.

== Roster ==
2012–13 New Mexico State Aggies men's basketball team
Players
Coaches

Pos.	#	Name	Height	Weight	Year	Previous school	Hometown
C	2	Sim Bhullar	7 ft 5 in (2.26 m)	360 lb (163 kg)	Fr	Huntington Prep	Toronto, ON
F	3	Remi Barry	6 ft 7 in (2.01 m)	210 lb (95 kg)	So	Del Oro High School	Paris, France
G	5	Kevin Aronis	6 ft 3 in (1.91 m)	185 lb (84 kg)	Jr	Santa Rosa Junior College; Analy High School	Sebastopol, California
F	10	Bandja Sy	6 ft 8 in (2.03 m)	214 lb (97 kg)	Sr	Stoneridge Prep	Cergy, France
G	11	Eric Weary	6 ft 5 in (1.96 m)	210 lb (95 kg)	RS Fr	Warren Easton Charter	New Orleans, LA
G	12	K.C. Ross-Miller	6 ft 0 in (1.83 m)	180 lb (82 kg)	So	New Orleans; God's Academy	Grand Prairie, Texas
G	14	Terrel de Rouen	6 ft 1 in (1.85 m)	165 lb (75 kg)	So	Onate High School	Las Cruces, NM
C	15	Tshilidzi Nephawe (injured)	6 ft 10 in (2.08 m)	268 lb (122 kg)	Jr	Stoneridge Prep	Johannesburg, South Africa
F	20	Matej Buovac	6 ft 7 in (2.01 m)	220 lb (100 kg)	Fr	La Lumiere HS	Zagreb, Croatia
G	22	Emery Coleman	6 ft 3 in (1.91 m)	180 lb (82 kg)	Fr	Tularosa High School	Tularosa, NM
G	23	Daniel Mullings	6 ft 2 in (1.88 m)	170 lb (77 kg)	So	Sir Wilfrid Laurier Collegiate Institute	Toronto, ON
G	25	Renaldo Dixon	6 ft 10 in (2.08 m)	210 lb (95 kg)	Jr	Christian Faith Academy	Toronto, ON
F	34	Aaron Kubinski	6 ft 5 in (1.96 m)	195 lb (88 kg)	Fr	La Cueva High School	Albuquerque, NM
F	35	B.J. West	6 ft 11 in (2.11 m)	240 lb (109 kg)	RS Jr	God's Academy	Cheneyville, LA
F	45	Tyrone Watson	6 ft 5 in (1.96 m)	225 lb (102 kg)	Sr	Cathedral High School	Hamilton, Ontario

Head coach

- Marvin Menzies (UCLA)

Assistant coach(es)

- Paul Weir (York)
- Keith Brown (Pacific)
- Tony Delk (Kentucky)

Legend

- (C) Team captain
- (S) Suspended
- (I) Ineligible
- (W) Walk-on
- Injured
- Current redshirt

Roster

== Schedule ==
Date time, TV	Rank^{#}	Opponent^{#}	Result	Record	High points	High rebounds	High assists	Site (attendance) city, state
Exhibition
11/05/2012*; 7:00 pm		Western New Mexico	W 98–49	–	13 – Tied	7 – Sy	5 – de Rouen	Pan American Center (3,716); Las Cruces, NM
Regular season
11/11/2012*; 7:30 pm, ESPNU		at Oregon State; 2K Sports Classic	L 62–71	0–1	14 – Tied	9 – Sy	3 – Watson	Gill Coliseum (3,368); Corvallis, OR
11/15/2012*; 8:00 pm		Southeastern Louisiana	W 81–56	1–1	24 – Watson	10 – Sy	6 – Ross-Miller	Pan American Center (5,107); Las Cruces, NM
11/17/2012*; 3:30 pm		vs. Bucknell; 2k Sports Classic	L 49–62	1–2	22 – Mullings	6 – Mullings	3 – Mullings	Gallagher Center (645); Lewiston, NY
11/18/2012*; 2:00 pm		at Niagara; 2k Sports Classic	L 83–86	1–3	26 – Mullings	10 – Nephawe	5 – Watson	Gallagher Center (1,593); Lewiston, NY
11/21/2012*; 7:00 pm		Northern New Mexico; 2K Sports Classic	W 67–37	2–3	12 – Dixon	7 – Tied	7 – Mullings	Pan American Center (4,616); Las Cruces, NM
11/23/2012*; 7:30 pm		Louisiana–Lafayette	W 79–57	3–3	16 – Sy	11 – Nephawe	3 – Tied	Pan American Center (5,291); Las Cruces, NM
11/28/2012*; 7:00 pm		at UTEP; The Battle of I-10	L 54–55	3–4	13 – Watson	6 – Mullings	3 – Watson	Don Haskins Center (9,366); El Paso, TX
12/01/2012*; 7:00 pm, AggieVision/ESPN3		Southern Miss	W 68–60	4–4	21 – Mullings	11 – Mullings	5 – Watson	Pan American Center (5,206); Las Cruces, NM
12/04/2012*; 6:00 pm		at South Alabama	W 58–52	5–4	13 – Mullings	14 – Sy	2 – Tied	Mitchell Center (2,067); Mobile, AL
12/15/2012*; 4:00 pm, CBSSN		at No. 17 New Mexico; Rio Grande Rivalry	L 58–73	5–5	14 – Mullings	11 – Watson	4 – Ross-Miller	The Pit (15,411); Albuquerque, NM
12/19/2012*; 7:00 pm, AggieVision/ESPN3		No. 16 New Mexico; Rio Grande Rivalry	L 63–68	5–6	13 – Mullings	10 – Sy	5 – Mullings	Pan American Center (8,177); Las Cruces, NM
12/22/2012*; 7:00 pm, AggieVision/ESPN3		Missouri State	W 71–51	6–6	25 – Bhullar	9 – Sy	6 – Ross-Miller	Pan American Center (4,877); Las Cruces, NM
12/29/2012; 6:00 pm		at Texas–Arlington	L 47–68	6–7 (0–1)	21 – Mullings	7 – Sy	4 – Watson	College Park Center (1,518); Arlington, TX
12/31/2012; 6:00 pm		at Louisiana Tech	L 72–81	6–8 (0–2)	21 – Mullings	6 – Dixon	4 – Ross-Miller	Thomas Assembly Center (2,129); Ruston, LA
01/03/2013; 7:00 pm, AggieVision/ESPN3		UTSA	W 82–62	7–8 (1–2)	25 – Sy	8 – Sy	6 – Watson	Pan American Center (4,617); Las Cruces, NM
01/05/2013; 7:00 pm, AggieVision/ESPN3		Texas State	W 78–67	8–8 (2–2)	22 – Mullings	10 – Sy	6 – Ross-Miller	Pan American Center (4,951); Las Cruces, NM
01/10/2013; 8:00 pm, RTNW		at Seattle	W 83–82 ^{2OT}	9–8 (3–2)	26 – Watson	11 – Bhullar	5 – Watson	KeyArena (2,273); Seattle, WA
01/12/2013; 8:05 pm		at Idaho	W 71–70	10–8 (4–2)	16 – Tied	7 – Sy	3 – Watson	Cowan Spectrum (998); Moscow, ID
01/17/2013; 7:00 pm, AggieVision/ESPN3		Utah State	W 64–51	11–8 (5–2)	16 – Sy	7 – Tied	3 – Tied	Pan American Center (7,119); Las Cruces, NM
01/19/2013; 7:00 pm, AggieVision/ESPN3		San Jose State	W 70–53	12–8 (6–2)	16 – Sy	9 – Bhullar	4 – Watson	Pan American Center (6,644); Las Cruces, NM
01/23/2013; 9:00 pm, ESPNU		Denver	W 53–42	13–8 (7–2)	12 – Watson	8 – Tied	2 – Tied	Pan American Center (6,394); Las Cruces, NM
01/31/2013; 6:00 pm		at Texas State	W 86–72	14–8 (8–2)	24 – Sy	13 – Sy	6 – de Rouen	Strahan Coliseum (2,011); San Marcos, TX
02/02/2013; 5:00 pm		at UTSA	W 75–62	15–8 (9–2)	17 – Tied	18 – Bhullar	5 – de Rouen	Convocation Center (1,469); San Antonio, TX
02/07/2013; 7:00 pm, AggieVision/ESPN3		Idaho	W 76–74	16–8 (10–2)	20 – Bhullar	15 – Sy	4 – Tied	Pan American Center (5,675); Las Cruces, NM
02/09/2013; 7:00 pm, AggieVision/ESPN3		Seattle	W 60–57	17–8 (11–2)	18 – Mullings	9 – Bhullar	3 – de Rouen	Pan American Center (6,219); Las Cruces, NM
02/14/2013; 8:00 pm		at San Jose State	W 67–57	18–8 (12–2)	15 – Mullings	14 – Dixon	5 – Tied	Event Center Arena (1,066); San Jose, CA
02/16/2013; 9:00 pm, ESPNU		at Utah State	L 69–73	18–9 (12–3)	15 – Barry	8 – Bhullar	4 – de Rouen	Smith Spectrum (7,646); Logan, UT
02/23/2013*; 7:00 pm, ESPN3		UTEP; The Battle of I-10	W 55–51	19–9	11 – Aronis	9 – Bhullar	5 – Mullings	Pan American Center (10,729); Las Cruces, NM
03/02/2013; 4:00 pm, ESPN3		at Denver	L 60–66	19–10 (12–4)	21 – Sy	11 – Sy	5 – Watson	Magness Arena (5,253); Denver, CO
03/07/2013; 7:00 pm, AggieVision/ESPN3		Louisiana Tech	W 78–60	20–10 (13–4)	23 – Mullings	11 – Watson	3 – Tied	Pan American Center (6,941); Las Cruces, NM
03/09/2013; 7:00 pm, AggieVision/ESPN3		Texas–Arlington	W 69–66	21–10 (14–4)	19 – Sy	12 – Bhullar	5 – Mullings	Pan American Center (6,849); Las Cruces, NM
2013 WAC Men's Basketball Tournament
03/14/2013; 1:00 pm		vs. Idaho; Quarterfinals	W 65–49	22–10	23 – Mullings	7 – Tied	1 – Tied	Orleans Arena (N/A); Paradise, NV
03/15/2013; 7:00 pm		vs. Texas State; Semifinals	W 74–65	23–10	14 – Bhullar	10 – Bhullar	5 – Ross-Miller	Orleans Arena (949); Paradise, NV
03/16/2013; 9:00 pm		vs. Texas–Arlington; Championship Game	W 64–55	24–10	16 – Tied	15 – Bhullar	3 – Mullings	Orleans Arena (N/A); Paradise, NV
2013 NCAA Tournament
03/21/2013*; 12:10 pm, TNT	No. (13 MW)	vs. (4 MW) Saint Louis; Second Round	L 44–64	24–11	17 – Sy	11 – Bhullar	4 – Mullings	HP Pavilion (16,836); San Jose, CA
*Non-conference game. ^{#}Rankings from AP Poll. (#) Tournament seedings in parentheses. All times are in Mountain Time. (#) during NCAA Tournament is seed with Region MW=Midwest.
