= 2012–13 UTSA Roadrunners men's basketball team =

American college basketball season

2012–13 UTSA Roadrunners men's basketball
- Conference: Western Athletic Conference
- Record: 10–22 (3–14 WAC)
- Head coach: Brooks Thompson (7th season)
- Assistant coaches: Dan O'Dowd; Robert Guster; Jeff Renegar
- Home arena: Convocation Center

2012–13 WAC men's basketball standings
	Conf.				Overall
Team	W		L	PCT	W		L	PCT
Louisiana Tech*	16	–	2	.889	27	–	7	.794
Denver	16	–	2	.889	22	–	10	.688
New Mexico State †	14	–	4	.778	24	–	11	.686
Utah State	11	–	7	.611	21	–	10	.677
Texas–Arlington	11	–	7	.611	19	–	14	.576
Idaho	7	–	11	.389	12	–	18	.400
Texas State	5	–	13	.278	12	–	22	.353
UTSA	3	–	14	.176	10	–	22	.313
San Jose State	3	–	14	.176	9	–	20	.310
Seattle	3	–	15	.167	8	–	22	.267
† 2013 WAC tournament winner As of March 25, 2013 * WAC Tournament #1 seed Rankings from AP Poll

The 2012–13 UTSA Roadrunners men's basketball team represented the University of Texas at San Antonio during the 2012–13 NCAA Division I men's basketball season. The Roadrunners, led by seventh year head coach Brooks Thompson, played their home games at the Convocation Center and were first year members of the Western Athletic Conference. They finished the season 10–22, 3–14 in WAC play to finish in a tie for eighth place. They advanced to the semifinals of the WAC tournament to Texas–Arlington.

This was their only season as a member of the WAC as they joined Conference USA in July 2013.

== Roster ==
Number	Name	Position	Height	Weight	Year	Hometown
0	A.J. Price	Guard	6–2	175	Freshman	The Colony, Texas
1	Devon Agusi	Guard	6–0	170	Senior	Dallas, Texas
2	Hyjii Thomas	Guard	6–3	175	Junior	Houston, Texas
3	Larry Wilkins	Forward/Center	6–4	250	Senior	San Antonio, Texas
4	Danté Willis	Guard	6–3	185	Freshman	Kingwood, Texas
5	Tank Mayberry	Center	6–10	280	Sophomore	Corpus Christi, Texas
10	Jeremy Hines	Guard	6–1	165	Sophomore	Bellaire, Texas
11	Michael Hale III	Guard	5–9	150	Senior	Federal Way, Washington
12	Jeromie Hill	Forward	6–8	230	Junior	Cairns, Australia
15	Lucas O'Brien	Center	6–10	220	Freshman	Chandler, Arizona
20	Edrico McGregor	Forward	6–8	240	Junior	Nassau, Bahamas
22	Kannon Burrage	Guard	6–3	185	Senior	East Moline, Illinois
24	Phillip Jones	Forward	6–6	200	Freshman	Freeport, Bahamas
32	Jordan Sims	Guard/Forward	6–4	185	Junior	El Mirage, Arizona
42	Tyler Wood	Forward	6–6	230	Junior	San Antonio, Texas
	George Matthews	Guard	6–5	220	Sophomore	Phoenix, Arizona

== Schedule ==
Date time, TV	Opponent	Result	Record	Site (attendance) city, state
Exhibition
11/01/2012*; 7:00 pm	Southeastern Oklahoma State	W 71–43	–	Convocation Center (1,176); San Antonio, TX
Regular season
11/09/2012*; 4:00 pm	vs. Morgan State; Liberty Tax Classic	L 59–71	0–1	Ted Constant Convocation Center (7,283); Norfolk, VA
11/10/2012*; 4:00 pm	vs. Holy Cross; Liberty Tax Classic	W 60–56	1–1	Ted Constant Convocation Center (6,993); Norfolk, VA
11/11/2012*; 1:00 pm, KCWX	at Old Dominion; Liberty Tax Classic	W 79–70	2–1	Ted Constant Convocation Center (6,233); Norfolk, VA
11/17/2012*; 2:00 pm	South Carolina Upstate	W 67–59	3–1	Convocation Center (1,015); San Antonio, TX
11/21/2012*; 8:00 pm, BYUtv	at BYU	L 62–81	3–2	Marriott Center (16,475); Provo, UT
11/29/2012*; 9:00 pm, Pac-12	at Oregon	L 78–95	3–3	Matthew Knight Arena (5,204); Eugene, OR
12/01/2012*; 9:00 pm	at Cal State Bakersfield	L 52–85	3–4	Rabobank Arena (2,037); Bakersfield, CA
12/04/2012*; 7:00 pm	at Mississippi State	L 42–53	3–5	Humphrey Coliseum (6,021); Starkville, MS
12/08/2012*; 1:30 pm	at South Carolina Upstate	L 77–88	3–6	G. B. Hodge Center (775); Spartanburg, SC
12/21/2012*; 7:00 pm, CSNHOU	at Texas A&M–Corpus Christi	W 75–45	4–6	American Bank Center (1,266); Corpus Christi, TX
12/29/2012; 6:00 pm	Utah State	L 67–71	4–7 (0–1)	Convocation Center (1,077); San Antonio, TX
12/31/2012; 2:00 pm	San Jose State	L 67–80	4–8 (0–2)	Convocation Center (865); San Antonio, TX
01/03/2013; 8:00 pm, KCWX	at New Mexico State	L 62–82	4–9 (0–3)	Pan American Center (4,617); Las Cruces, NM
01/06/2013; 3:00 pm	at Denver	L 50–75	4–10 (0–4)	Magness Arena (2,924); Denver, CO
01/10/2013; 7:00 pm, TWCS TX	Texas–Arlington	L 67–75	4–11 (0–5)	Convocation Center (1,094); San Antonio, TX
01/12/2013; 6:00 pm	Louisiana Tech	L 71–73	4–12 (0–6)	Convocation Center (1,203); San Antonio, TX
01/19/2013; 4:00 pm, TWCS TX	Texas State	L 78–81 ^{OT}	4–13 (0–7)	Convocation Center (2,359); San Antonio, TX
01/24/2013; 9:00 pm, ROOT NW	at Seattle	W 78–75	5–13 (1–7)	KeyArena (2,328); Seattle, WA
01/26/2013; 9:05 pm	at Idaho	L 70–74	5–14 (1–8)	Cowan Spectrum (1,139); Moscow, ID
01/31/2013; 7:00 pm	Denver	L 57–71	5–15 (1–9)	Convocation Center (1,317); San Antonio, TX
02/02/2013; 6:00 pm	New Mexico State	L 62–75	5–16 (1–10)	Convocation Center (1,469); San Antonio, TX
02/07/2013; 7:00 pm	at Louisiana Tech	L 49–74	5–17 (1–11)	Thomas Assembly Center (4,061); Ruston, LA
02/09/2013; 7:00 pm	at Texas–Arlington	L 63–68	5–18 (1–12)	College Park Center (2,112); Arlington, TX
02/12/2013*; 7:00 pm	Cal State Bakersfield	L 52–61	5–19	Convocation Center (1,007); San Antonio, TX
02/16/2013; 4:00 pm	at Texas State	W 73–62	6–19 (2–12)	Strahan Coliseum (3,124); San Marcos, TX
02/23/2013*; 2:00 pm	Nicholls State; BracketBusters	W 76–58	7–19	Convocation Center (861); San Antonio, TX
02/28/2013; 7:00 pm, KCWX	Idaho	W 74–56	8–19 (3–12)	Convocation Center (1,444); San Antonio, TX
03/02/2013; 6:00 pm, KCWX	Seattle	L 37–53	8–20 (3–13)	Convocation Center (1,454); San Antonio, TX
03/07/2013; 9:00 pm	at San Jose State			Event Center Arena; San Jose, CA
03/09/2013; 8:05 pm, KCWX/ESPN3	at Utah State	L 51–71	8–21 (3–14)	Smith Spectrum (6,984); Logan, UT
WAC tournament
03/12/2013; 10:30 pm	vs. San Jose State; First Round	W 67–49	9–21	Orleans Arena (N/A); Paradise, NV
03/14/2013; 8:00 pm	vs. Louisiana Tech; Quarterfinals	W 73–67	10–21	Orleans Arena (N/A); Paradise, NV
03/15/2013; 10:30 pm	vs. Texas–Arlington; Semifinals	L 53–69	10–22	Orleans Arena (949); Paradise, NV
*Non-conference game. ^{#}Rankings from AP Poll. (#) Tournament seedings in parentheses. All times are in Central Time.

March 7's game vs San Jose State was canceled due to a leak in the roof at The Events Center Arena in San Jose. The game was not made up.
