= 2013 WAC men's basketball tournament =

- 2013 WAC Tournament logo
- Classification: Division I
- Season: 2012–13
- Teams: 10
- Site: Orleans Arena; Paradise, Nevada, USA
- Champions: New Mexico State (4th title)
- Winning coach: Marvin Menzies (3rd title)
- Television: ESPNU

2012–13 WAC men's basketball standings
| | Conf. | | | | Overall |
| Team | W | | L | PCT | W | | L | PCT |
|---|---|---|---|---|---|---|---|---|
| Louisiana Tech* | 16 | – | 2 | .889 | 27 | – | 7 | .794 |
| Denver | 16 | – | 2 | .889 | 22 | – | 10 | .688 |
| New Mexico State † | 14 | – | 4 | .778 | 24 | – | 11 | .686 |
| Utah State | 11 | – | 7 | .611 | 21 | – | 10 | .677 |
| Texas–Arlington | 11 | – | 7 | .611 | 19 | – | 14 | .576 |
| Idaho | 7 | – | 11 | .389 | 12 | – | 18 | .400 |
| Texas State | 5 | – | 13 | .278 | 12 | – | 22 | .353 |
| UTSA | 3 | – | 14 | .176 | 10 | – | 22 | .313 |
| San Jose State | 3 | – | 14 | .176 | 9 | – | 20 | .310 |
| Seattle | 3 | – | 15 | .167 | 8 | – | 22 | .267 |
† 2013 WAC tournament winner As of March 25, 2013 * WAC Tournament #1 seed Rankings from AP Poll

The 2013 WAC men's basketball tournament was the 30th basketball tournament hosted by the WAC and was held March 12–16, 2013 at the Orleans Arena in Paradise, Nevada. The winner, New Mexico State, received an automatic bid to the 2013 NCAA tournament. The 2013 Championship game was televised on ESPNU. With the departure of Nevada, and Fresno State to the Mountain West, and Hawaiʻi to the Big West, and the additions of Denver, Seattle, Texas–Arlington, UTSA, and Texas State the WAC held a ten-team tournament for 2013.

== Bracket ==
First Round; Tuesday March, 12
8 | San Jose State | 49
9 | UTSA | 67
7 | Texas State | 68
10 | Seattle | 56

Quarterfinals; Thursday March, 14
1 | Louisiana Tech | 67
9 | UTSA | 73
4 | Texas–Arlington | 83
5 | Utah State | 78
2 | Denver | 68
7 | Texas State | 72
3 | New Mexico State | 65
6 | Idaho | 49

Semifinals; Friday March, 15
9 | UTSA | 53
4 | Texas–Arlington | 69
7 | Texas State | 65
3 | New Mexico State | 74

Championship game Saturday March, 16; ESPNU
4 | Texas–Arlington | 55
3 | New Mexico State | 64
