= 2013 NCAA Division II women's basketball tournament =

- Teams: 64
- Finals site: Bill Greehey Arena, San Antonio, Texas
- Champions: Ashland Eagles (1st title)
- Runner-up: Dowling Golden Lions (1st title game)
- Semifinalists: Augustana (SD) Vikings (1st Final Four); Western Washington Vikings (2nd Final Four)
- Winning coach: Sue Ramsey (1st title)
- MOP: Kari Daugherty (Ashland)

The 2013 NCAA Division II women's basketball tournament was the 32nd annual tournament hosted by the NCAA to determine the national champion of Division II women's collegiate basketball in the United States.

Ashland defeated Dowling in the championship game, 71–56, to claim the Eagles' first NCAA Division II national title.

The championship rounds were contested at Bill Greehey Arena on the campus of the St. Mary's University in San Antonio, Texas.

== Regionals ==
=== Central - Topeka, Kansas ===
Location: Lee Arena Host: Washburn University

First round Round of 64; March 15
2 | Central Missouri | 71
7 | Southwestern Oklahoma State | 73
6 | Augustana (SD) | 78
3 | Concordia-St. Paul | 66
1 | Washburn | 58
8 | Emporia State | 65
4 | Minnesota State | 72
5 | Arkansas Tech | 58

Regional semifinals Round of 32; March 16
7 | Southwestern Oklahoma State | 64
6 | Augustana (SD) | 68
8 | Emporia State | 69
4 | Minnesota State | 67

Regional finals Sweet 16; March 18
6 | Augustana (SD) | 75
8 | Emporia State | 74

=== Southeast - Morrow, Georgia ===
Location: Athletics and Fitness Center Host: Clayton State University

First round Round of 64; March 15
1 | Clayton State | 91
8 | Mount Olive | 58
5 | South Carolina-Aiken | 94
4 | Lenoir-Rhyne | 71
2 | Limestone | 64
7 | Barton | 59
6 | Pfeiffer | 84
3 | Anderson (SC) | 78

Regional semifinals Round of 32; March 16
1 | Clayton State | 83
5 | South Carolina-Aiken | 66
2 | Limestone | 67
6 | Pfeiffer | 52

Regional finals Sweet 16; March 18
1 | Clayton State | 87
2 | Limestone | 65

=== East - Waltham, Massachusetts ===
Location: Dana Center Host: Bentley College

First round Round of 64; March 15
1 | Bentley | 68
8 | LIU Post | 57
4 | Holy Family | 68
5 | Assumption | 62
3 | Dowling | 62
6 | NYIT | 51
2 | Stonehill | 78
7 | Franklin Pierce | 66

Regional semifinals Round of 32; March 16
1 | Bentley | 85
4 | Holy Family | 56
3 | Dowling | 57
2 | Stonehill | 45

Regional finals Sweet 16; March 18
1 | Bentley | 51
3 | Dowling | 53

=== South Central - Grand Junction, Colorado ===
Location: Brownson Arena Host: Colorado Mesa University

First round Round of 64; March 15
1 | Colorado Mesa | 74
8 | Fort Lewis | 48
4 | Texas-Permian Basin | 70
5 | Abilene Christian | 68
2 | Midwestern State | 91
7 | Tarleton State | 78
6 | Metro State | 58
3 | St. Mary's (TX) | 55

Regional semifinals Round of 32; March 16
1 | Colorado Mesa | 78
4 | Texas-Permian Basin | 68
2 | Midwestern State | 66
6 | Metro State | 52

Regional finals Sweet 16; March 18
1 | Colorado Mesa | 69
2 | Midwestern State | 65

=== West - Bellingham, Washington ===
Location: Sam Carver Gymnasium Host: Western Washington University

First round Round of 64; March 16
1 | Western Washington | 70
8 | Academy of Art | 50
5 | Cal State-Monterey Bay | 66
4 | Chico State | 64
2 | Simon Fraser | 68
7 | Northwest Nazarene | 57
6 | Grand Canyon | 68
3 | UC-San Diego | 57

Regional semifinals Round of 32; March 18
1 | Western Washington | 71
5 | Cal State-Monterey Bay | 63
2 | Simon Fraser | 76
3 | Grand Canyon | 59

Regional finals Sweet 16; March 19
1 | Western Washington | 75
2 | Simon Fraser | 58

=== South - Davie, Florida ===
Location: University Center Host: Nova Southeastern University

First round Round of 64; March 15
1 | Nova Southeastern | 85
8 | Clark Atlanta | 60
5 | Rollins | 45
4 | Lynn | 44
3 | Delta State | 51
6 | North Alabama | 41
7 | Alabama-Huntsville | 78
2 | Tuskegee | 69

Regional semifinals Round of 32; March 16
1 | Nova Southeastern | 73
5 | Rollins | 57
3 | Delta State | 81
7 | Alabama-Huntsville | 58

Regional finals Sweet 16; March 18
1 | Nova Southeastern | 78
3 | Delta State | 56

=== Midwest - Ashland, Ohio ===
Location: Kates Gymnasium Host: Ashland University

First round Round of 64; March 15
1 | Ashland | 70
8 | Indianapolis | 56
4 | Michigan Tech | 79
5 | Kentucky Wesleyan | 67
6 | Wayne State (MI) | 63
3 | Findlay | 58
2 | Wisconsin-Parkside | 59
7 | Lewis | 49

Regional semifinals Round of 32; March 16
1 | Ashland | 67
4 | Michigan Tech | 54
6 | Wayne State (MI) | 70
7 | Wisconsin-Parkside | 60

Regional finals Sweet 16; March 18
1 | Ashland | 72
6 | Wayne State (MI) | 63

=== Atlantic - Erie, Pennsylvania ===
Location: Hammermill Center Host: Gannon University

First round Round of 64; March 15
1 | Gannon | 66
8 | Fairmont State | 40
4 | Indiana (PA) | 72
5 | Bloomsburg | 59
7 | California (PA) | 80
2 | Edinboro | 72
6 | Glenville State | 111
3 | Shaw | 86

Regional semifinals Round of 32; March 16
1 | Gannon | 64
4 | Indiana (PA) | 46
7 | California (PA) | 81
6 | Glenville State | 79

Regional finals Sweet 16; March 18
1 | Gannon | 50
7 | California (PA) | 47

== Elite Eight - San Antonio, Texas ==
Location: Bill Greehey Arena Host: Saint Mary's University

National quarterfinals Elite Eight; March 26
Augustana (SD) | 81
Clayton State | 68
Dowling | 60
Colorado Mesa | 44
Western Washington | 80**
Nova Southeastern | 76
Ashland | 74
Gannon | 63

National semifinals Final Four; March 27
Augustana (SD) | 54
Dowling | 76
Western Washington | 54
Ashland | 66

National championship March 29
Dowling | 56
Ashland | 71

== All-tournament team ==
- Kari Daugherty, Ashland
- Taylor Woods, Ashland
- Daiva Gerbec, Ashland
- Julia Koppl, Dowling
- Connie Simmons, Dowling
- Danielle Wilson, Dowling
- Nicole Caggiano, Dowling

== See also ==
- 2013 NCAA Division I women's basketball tournament
- 2013 NCAA Division III women's basketball tournament
- 2013 NAIA Division I women's basketball tournament
- 2013 NAIA Division II women's basketball tournament
- 2013 NCAA Division II men's basketball tournament
