= 2013 NAIA Division I women's basketball tournament =

- Teams: 32
- Finals site: Frankfort Convention Center, Frankfort, Kentucky
- Champions: Westmont Warriors (1st title, 1st title game, 1st Fab Four)
- Runner-up: Lee Flames (1st title game, 2nd Fab Four)
- Semifinalists: Cumberland Phoenix (2nd Fab Four); Freed–Hardeman Lions (4th Fab Four)
- Coach of the year: Kirsten Moore (Westmont)
- Player of the year: Tugce Canitez (Westmont)
- Charles Stevenson Hustle Award: Maria Bagwell (Freed–Hardeman)
- Chuck Taylor MVP: Tugce Canitez (Westmont)
- Top scorer: Priscila Santos (William Woods) (62 points)

The 2013 NAIA Division I women's basketball tournament was the tournament held by the NAIA to determine the national champion of women's college basketball among its Division I members in the United States and Canada for the 2012–13 basketball season.

Westmont defeated Lee (TN) in the championship game, 71–65, to claim the Warriors' first NAIA national title.

The tournament was played at the Frankfort Convention Center in Frankfort, Kentucky.

== Qualification ==
The tournament field remained fixed at thirty-two teams, which were sorted into four quadrants of eight teams each. Within each quadrant, teams were seeded sequentially from one to eight based on record and season performance.

The tournament continued to utilize a simple single-elimination format.

== Bracket ==
First round
1	Oklahoma City	74
8	Central Methodist	39
5	Shawnee State	62
4	Columbia (MO)	56
3	The Master's	58
6	Carroll (MT)	73
7	LSU Shreveport	55
2	Lee (TN)	60
2	Cumberland (TN)	59
7	Coastal Georgia	47
6	Bethel (TN)	74
3	Benedictine (KS)	81
4	Georgetown (KY)	66
5	Lyon (AR)	55
8	Southern New Orleans	57
1	Lubbock Christian	78
1	Freed–Hardeman	82
8	West Virginia Tech	48
5	Wiley	55
4	Campbellsville	71
3	MidAmerica Nazarene	75
6	William Woods	79
7	Southern Poly	76
2	Vanguard	82
2	Westminster (UT)	69
7	St. Catherine	55
6	Faulkner	67
3	Xavier Louisiana	63
4	Rogers State	79
5	Our Lady of the Lake	69
8	Cumberlands (KY)	58
1	Westmont	63

Second round
1	Oklahoma City	56
5	Shawnee State	54
6	Carroll (MT)	49
2	Lee (TN)	63
2	Cumberland (TN)	65
3	Benedictine (KS)	64
4	Georgetown (KY)	69
1	Lubbock Christian	93
1	Freed–Hardeman	71
4	Campbellsville	52
6	William Woods	60
2	Vanguard	85
2	Westminster (UT)	66
6	Faulkner	60
4	Rogers State	70
1	Westmont	77

Quarterfinals
1	Oklahoma City	48
2	Lee (TN)	59
2	Cumberland (TN)	63
1	Lubbock Christian	61
1	Freed–Hardeman	60
2	Vanguard	49
2	Westminster (UT)	36
1	Westmont	39

Semifinals
2	Lee (TN)	43
2	Cumberland (TN)	41
1	Freed–Hardeman	49
1	Westmont	59

National championship
2	Lee (TN)	65
1	Westmont	71

== See also ==
- 2013 NAIA Division I men's basketball tournament
- 2013 NCAA Division I women's basketball tournament
- 2013 NCAA Division II women's basketball tournament
- 2013 NCAA Division III women's basketball tournament
- 2013 NAIA Division II women's basketball tournament
