= 2013 NAIA Division I men's basketball tournament =

College basketball tournament

- Teams: 32
- Finals site: Municipal Auditorium, Kansas City, Missouri
- Champions: Georgetown Tigers
- Runner-up: SAGU Lions
- Semifinalists: LSU Shreveport Pilots; Lindsey Wilson Blue Raiders

The 2013 Buffalo Funds - NAIA Division I men's basketball tournament was held in March at Municipal Auditorium in Kansas City, Missouri. The 76th annual NAIA basketball tournament features 32 teams playing in a single-elimination format. The opening game started on March 13, and the National Championship Game was played on March 19.

== Awards and honors ==
- Leading scorer:
- Leading rebounder:
- Player of the Year:
- Most consecutive tournament appearances: 22nd, Georgetown (KY)
- Most tournament appearances: 32nd, Georgetown (KY)

== 2013 NAIA bracket ==
First round March 13–14	Second round March 15
1	Columbia (MO)	68
Oklahoma City	37
1	Columbia (MO)	66
Hope International	64
Hope International	80
16	Emmanuel (GA)	62
March 13
9	Evangel	64
Montana State–Northern	54
9	Evangel	70
LSU Shreveport	77
LSU Shreveport	91
8	Pikeville	87
5	Lewis–Clark State	72
Culver–Stockton	91
Culver–Stockton	97
Concordia (CA)	85
Concordia (CA)	92
12	William Carey	86
March 14
13	Georgetown (KY)	70
St. Thomas (TX)	68
13	Georgetown (KY)	80
4	John Brown	67
Life	66
4	John Brown	68
3	Lee	67
Voorhees	49
3	Lee	73
14	Montana Western	83
Philander Smith	94
14	Montana Western	99*
March 13
11	Westmont	65
Martin Methodist	71
Martin Methodist	68
6	SAGU	72
USAO	58
6	SAGU	62
7	Cal State San Marcos	98
MidAmerica Nazarene	109
MidAmerica Nazarene	68
10	Oklahoma Baptist	66
Arizona Christian	73
10	Oklahoma Baptist	83
March 14
15	Xavier (LA)	59
Faulkner	72
Faulkner	60
2	Lindsey Wilson	66
Rocky Mountain (MT)	79
2	Lindsey Wilson	84

Quarterfinals; March 16
1	Columbia (MO)	78
LSU Shreveport	79
Culver–Stockton	82
13	Georgetown (KY)	86
14	Montana Western	79
6	SAGU	84
MidAmerica Nazarene	74
2	Lindsey Wilson	83

National Semifinals; March 18
LSU Shreveport	88
13	Georgetown (KY)	90
6	SAGU	80
2	Lindsey Wilson	64

National Championship; March 19
13	Georgetown (KY)	88
6	SAGU	62

- * denotes overtime.

== See also ==
- 2013 NAIA Division I women's basketball tournament
- 2013 NCAA Division I men's basketball tournament
- 2013 NCAA Division II men's basketball tournament
- 2013 NCAA Division III men's basketball tournament
- 2013 NAIA Division II men's basketball tournament
