= Magness Arena =

Multi-purpose sports arena in Denver, Colorado

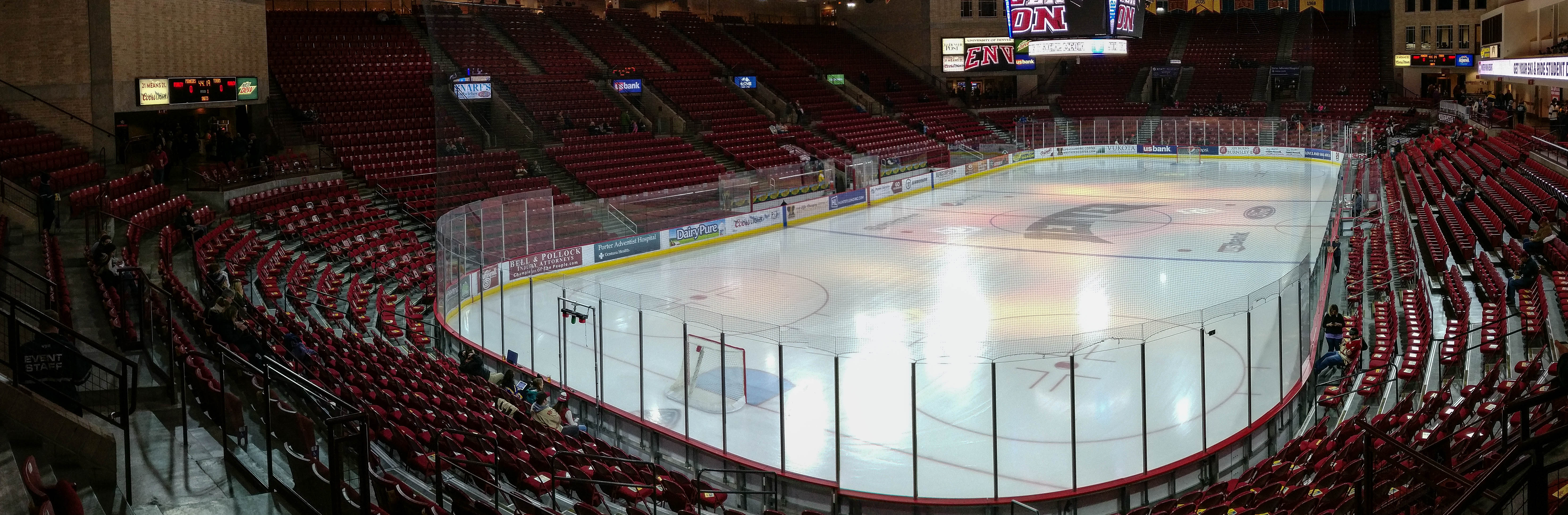
- NW view of the arena bowl (c.2016)
- Interactive map of Magness Arena
- Former names: University of Denver Auditorium (planning/construction)
- Address: 2240 Buchtell Blvd
- Location: Denver, Colorado
- Coordinates: 39°40′55.58″N 104°57′41.73″W
- Owner: University of Denver
- Capacity: 6,315 (Hockey); 7,200 (Basketball); 6,500-8,000 (Concert)
- Public transit: University of Denver; RTD Light Rail

Construction
- Groundbreaking: April 1997
- Opened: September 15, 1999
- Architects: Davis Partnership Architects and Sink Combs Dethlefs
- Structural engineer: Martin/Martin
- General contractor: Calcon Construction

Tenants
- Denver Pioneers (NCAA, NCHC) (1999–present)

Magness Arena is a multi-purpose collegiate sports arena in Denver, Colorado. It was built from 1997 to 1999 as part of the Daniel L. Ritchie Center, the sports complex at the University of Denver. It is home to the Denver Pioneers ice hockey team and secondary home to the basketball teams. It replaces the former University of Denver Arena which was razed in 1997 to make way for the Ritchie Center. Magness Arena opened September 1999, one month before the Pepsi Center. The arena was voted, "Best New Sports Venue" by Westword in 2000.

== About the arena ==
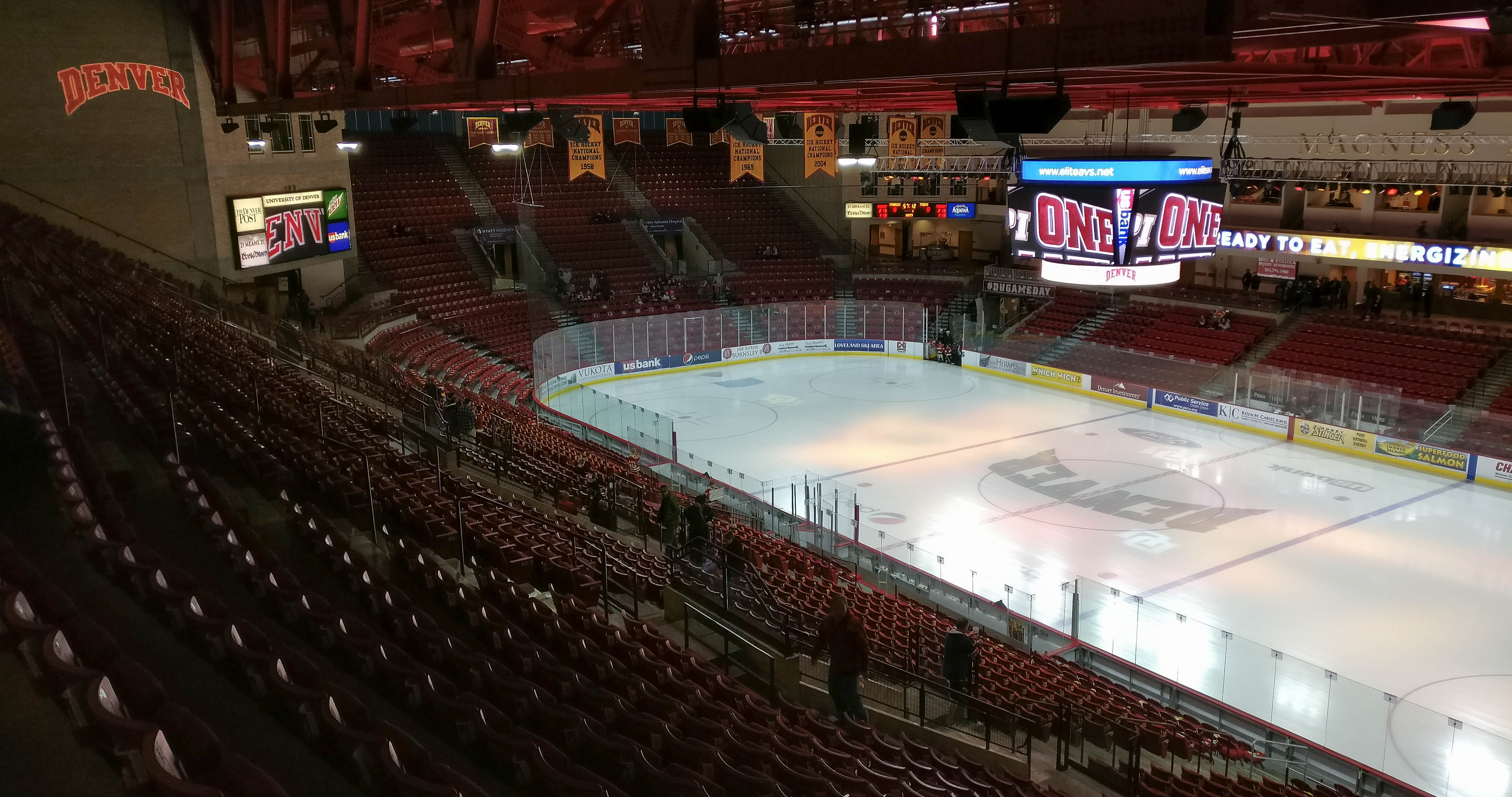
Magness arena looking north/northeast

The arena is named after cable television pioneer Bob Magness, who donated $10 million towards construction costs. It features padded individual seating, two members-only club seating areas, a four-sided video scoreboard, and a concourse with glassed-in views of the adjoining Hamilton Gymnasium and El Pomar Natatorium. The arena can be identified around the city by the attached 215-foot-tall (66 m), gold-spired Williams Tower, which contains a 65-bell carillon.

The largest hockey crowd in arena history was a game between Denver and Colorado College on March 9, 2024, with an attendance of 7,033. The largest non-hockey event in the arena was a 2008 presidential campaign rally for Barack Obama, where about 10,000 people attended. Magness Arena hosted the first of three 2012 U.S. Presidential Debates on October 3, 2012.

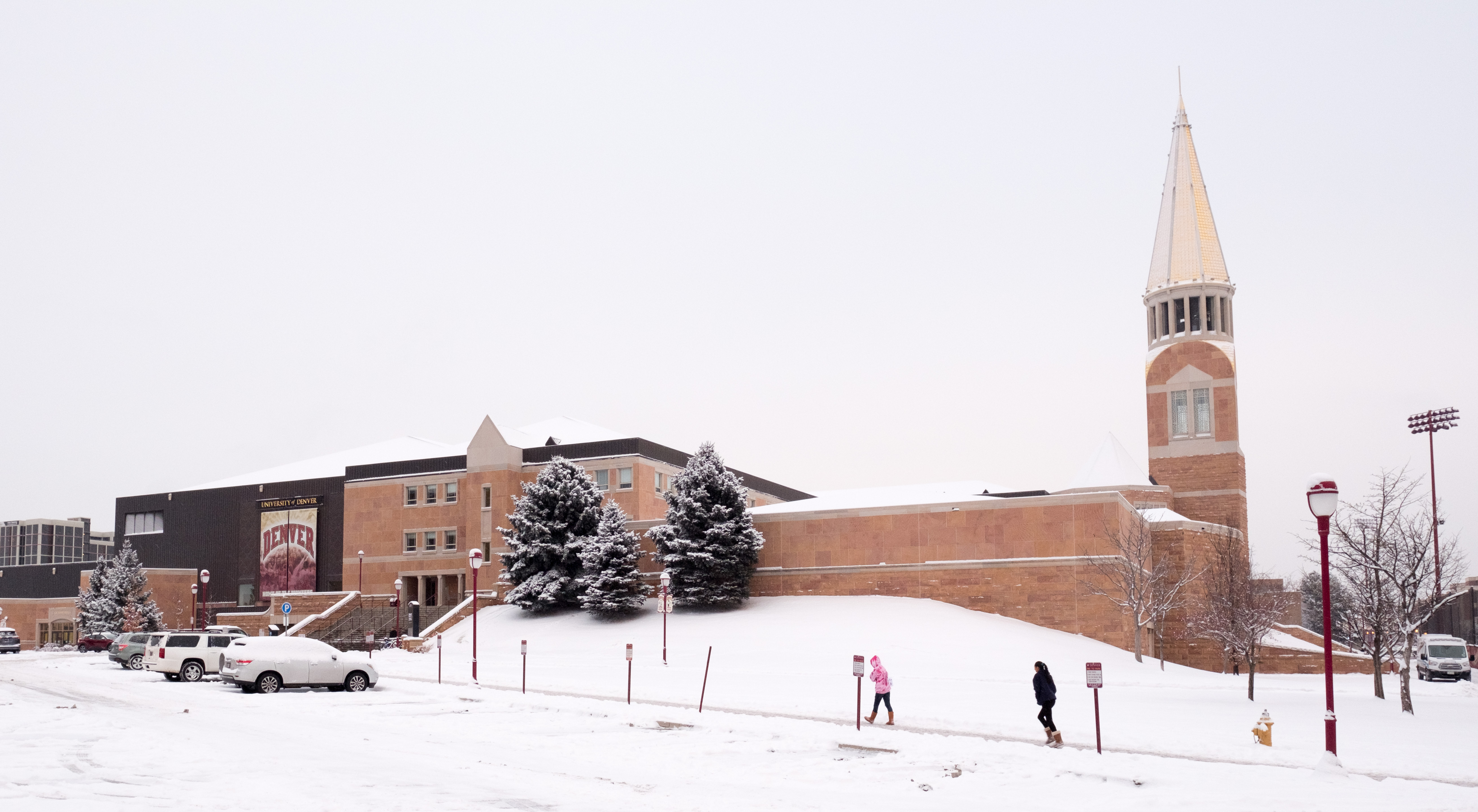
Magness Arena Exterior

== Concerts ==
List of Concerts
- Jethro Tull – September 24, 1999
- Garbage – October 20, 1999, with Lit
- The Moody Blues – October 30, 1999
- Counting Crows – December 2, 1999, with The Gigolo Aunts and December 4, 2002
- Def Leppard – December 9, 1999, December 17, 2002 and November 1, 2005, with Cheap Trick
- Tracy Chapman – April 14, 2000
- Beck – April 24, 2000, with DJ Swamp
- Luis Miguel – April 25, 2000, April 9, 2002, October 22, 2003 and October 4, 2005
- Brian Wilson – September 16, 2000
- Christina Aguilera – October 5, 2000, with Destiny's Child
- Matchbox 20 – October 16, 2000
- The Stone Temple Pilots – November 2, 2000, with Godsmack and Disturbed
- Sarah Brightman – November 8, 2000 and March 7, 2004
- The Roots – November 14, 2000
- The Trans-Siberian Orchestra – December 8, 2000, December 5, 2001 and December 2, 2002
- Prince & The New Power Generation – April 24, 2001, with Milenia and The Fonky Bald Heads
- The Irish Tenors – June 13, 2001
- Neil Sedaka & Dionne Warwick – June 24, 2001, with The Colorado Symphony Orchestra
- The Cult – June 26, 2001, with Stabbing Westward and Monster Magnet
- Aaron Carter – June 27, 2001, with Leslie Carter and A-Teens
- Jane's Addiction – October 31, 2001
- Sting – December 10, 2001, with Howie Day and April 12, 2005, with Phantom Planet
- Styx – March 22, 2002, with REO Speedwagon
- Bad Religion – March 23, 2002, with Less Than Jake and Hot Water Music
- Kid Rock & Twisted Brown Trucker – April 11, 2002, with Lit and Saliva
- Alanis Morissette – May 11, 2002, with Ryan Adams
- Maná – September 29, 2002
- American Idol Live! – November 12, 2002
- Tori Amos – December 5, 2002
- Scorpions – February 25, 2003, with Whitesnake and Dokken and October 27, 2004, with Tesla
- Good Charlotte – November 13, 2003, with Goldfinger and Eve 6
- KoЯn – November 15, 2003, with Limp Bizkit and DROID and March 8, 2006, with Mudvayne and 10 Years
- A Perfect Circle – March 20, 2004, with The Mars Volta
- The Pixies – September 30, 2004, with The Thrills
- Duran Duran – March 16, 2005
- Snoop Dogg – April 17, 2005, with Game
- Slipknot – April 20, 2005, with Lamb of God, Shadows Fall and The Dillinger Escape Plan
- Cake – April 25, 2005, with Gomez
- Velvet Revolver – April 26, 2005, with Hoobastank
- Gwen Stefani – October 26, 2005, with The Black Eyed Peas
- Depeche Mode – November 11, 2005, with The Bravery
- Fall Out Boy – April 12, 2006, with The All-American Rejects, Hawthorne Heights, From First to Last and The Hush Sound and November 23, 2007, with Gym Class Heroes, The Plain White T's, Cute Is What We Aim For and Doug
- Avenged Sevenfold – April 21, 2006, with Coheed and Cambria and Head Automatica
- Flogging Molly – October 3, 2006, with ZOX and Bedouin Soundclash
- Paul Simon – October 10, 2006, with The Jerry Douglas Band
- Dashboard Confessional – October 24, 2008, with Brand New
- James Blunt – October 28, 2006, with Starsailor
- The Barenaked Ladies – November 21, 2006, with Mike Doughty's Band
- Panic! at the Disco – November 28, 2006, with Jack's Mannequin, The Bloc Party and The Plain White T's
- The Taste of Chaos Tour – February 27, 2007, with Thirty Seconds to Mars and The Used
- My Chemical Romance – March 4, 2007, with Rise Against
- Evanescence – November 25, 2007, with Julien-K
- Juanes – April 25, 2008
- The Killers – January 17, 2009, with M83
- Neil Young – April 27, 2009, with The Neville Brothers and Everest
- Bob Dylan – October 21, 2009
- Rob Thomas – October 27, 2009, with OneRepublic and Carolina Liar
- KTCL 93.3's Not So Silent Night – December 6, 2009
- Slayer – August 25, 2010, with Megadeth and Testament
- The Winter Jam Tour Spectacular – November 3, 2011
- A Hot Summer's Night 2 – August 25 and September 8, 2012
- DUPB MusicFest – May 25, 2013
- KJHM Jammin' 101.5's Winter Wonder Jam – December 7, 2013

== See also ==
- List of NCAA Division I basketball arenas
