= 2012–13 Texas Longhorns men's basketball team =

American college basketball season

2012–13 Texas Longhorns men's basketball

CBI, First Round
- Conference: Big 12
- Record: 16–18 (7–11 Big 12)
- Head coach: Rick Barnes (15th season)
- Assistant coaches: Rob Lanier; Russell Springmann; Chris Ogden
- Home arena: Frank Erwin Center

2012–13 Big 12 men's basketball standings
	Conf.				Overall
Team	W		L	PCT	W		L	PCT
No. 3 Kansas †	14	–	4	.778	31	–	6	.838
No. 12 Kansas State	14	–	4	.778	27	–	8	.771
No. 17 Oklahoma State	13	–	5	.722	24	–	9	.727
Oklahoma	11	–	7	.611	20	–	12	.625
Iowa State	11	–	7	.611	23	–	12	.657
Baylor	9	–	9	.500	23	–	14	.622
Texas	7	–	11	.389	16	–	18	.471
West Virginia	6	–	12	.333	13	–	19	.406
Texas Tech	3	–	15	.167	11	–	20	.355
TCU	2	–	16	.111	11	–	21	.344
† 2013 Big 12 Tournament winner Rankings from AP poll

The 2012–13 Texas Longhorns men's basketball team represented the University of Texas at Austin in the 2012–13 NCAA Division I men's basketball season. Their head coach was Rick Barnes, who was in his 15th year. The team played their home games at the Frank Erwin Center in Austin, Texas and were members of the Big 12 Conference. They finished the season 16–18, 7–11 in Big 12 play to finish in seventh place. They lost in the quarterfinals of the Big 12 tournament to Kansas State. Texas received an invitation to the 2013 College Basketball Invitational and became the first Big 12 team to participate in the postseason tournament's six-year history. The Longhorns lost in the first round to former Southwest Conference rival Houston.

== Before the season ==
=== Departures ===
Name	Number	Pos.	Height	Weight	Year	Hometown	Notes
Sterling Gibbs	13	G	6'1"	185	Freshman	Scotch Plains, New Jersey	Transferred to Seton Hall University
J'Covan Brown	14	G	6'1"	197	Junior	Port Arthur, Texas	Entered 2012 NBA draft, signed free agent contract with Miami Heat
Alexis Wangmene	20	F/C	6'7"	241	Senior	Maroua, Cameroon	Graduated, played with San Antonio Spurs Summer League team
Clint Chapman	53	F/C	6'10"	245	Senior	Canby, Oregon	Graduated

=== Recruiting ===
College recruiting
Name	Hometown	School	Height	Weight	Commit date
Cameron Ridley; C	Richmond, TX	Bush	6 ft 9 in (2.06 m)	270 lb (120 kg)	Jan 14, 2011
Cameron Ridley; C	Recruit ratings: Scout: Rivals: (97)				
Javan Felix; PG	New Orleans, LA	St. Augustine	5 ft 10 in (1.78 m)	190 lb (86 kg)	Aug 8, 2011
Javan Felix; PG	Recruit ratings: Scout: Rivals: (92)				
DeMarcus Holland; SG	Garland, TX	Naaman Forest	6 ft 2 in (1.88 m)	170 lb (77 kg)	Apr 8, 2012
DeMarcus Holland; SG	Recruit ratings: Scout: Rivals: (86)				
Prince Ibeh; F/C	Garland, TX	Naaman Forest	6 ft 10 in (2.08 m)	245 lb (111 kg)	Oct 13, 2011
Prince Ibeh; F/C	Recruit ratings: Scout: Rivals: (94)				
Connor Lammert; PF	San Antonio, TX	Churchill	6 ft 9 in (2.06 m)	232 lb (105 kg)	Oct 3, 2011
Connor Lammert; PF	Recruit ratings: Scout: Rivals: (92)				
Ioannis Papapetrou; SF	Melbourne, FL	Florida Air Academy	6 ft 8 in (2.03 m)	225 lb (102 kg)	Oct 22, 2011
Ioannis Papapetrou; SF	Recruit ratings: Scout: Rivals: (89)				
Overall recruit ranking: Scout: 7 Rivals: 11 ESPN: 4
Note: In many cases, Scout, Rivals, 247Sports, On3, and ESPN may conflict in their listings of height and weight.; In these cases, the average was taken. ESPN grades are on a 100-point scale.; Sources: "Texas 2012 Basketball Commitments". Rivals.; "2012 Texas Basketball Commits". Scout.; "ESPN". ESPN.; "Scout.com Team Recruiting Rankings". Scout.; "2012 Team Ranking". Rivals.

== Schedule ==
Date time, TV	Opponent	Result	Record	Site (attendance) city, state
Non-conference regular season
11/09/2012*; 7:00 pm, LHN	Fresno State	W 55–53	1–0	Frank Erwin Center (10,389); Austin, TX
11/12/2012*; 7:00 pm, LHN	Coppin State; Maui Invitational Tournament Opening Round	W 69–46	2–0	Frank Erwin Center (8,603); Austin, TX
11/19/2012*; 8:30 pm, ESPNU	at Chaminade; Maui Invitational Tournament quarterfinals	L 73–86	2–1	Lahaina Civic Center (2,400); Lahaina, HI
11/20/2012*; 4:00 pm, ESPN2	vs. USC; Maui Invitational Tournament consolation round	L 53–59	2–2	Lahaina Civic Center (2,400); Lahaina, HI
11/21/2012*; 1:30 pm, ESPNU	vs. Mississippi State; Maui Invitational Tournament 7th place game	W 69–55	3–2	Lahaina Civic Center (2,400); Lahaina, HI
11/27/2012*; 7:00 pm, LHN	Sam Houston State	W 65–37	4–2	Frank Erwin Center (9,170); Austin, TX
12/01/2012*; 3:00 pm, LHN	UT-Arlington	W 70–54	5–2	Frank Erwin Center (3,926); Austin, TX
12/04/2012*; 6:00 pm, ESPN	vs. No. 15 Georgetown; Jimmy V Classic	L 41–64	5–3	Madison Square Garden (11,840); New York, NY
12/08/2012*; 4:15 pm, ESPN	vs. UCLA	L 63–65	5–4	Reliant Stadium (2,797); Houston, TX
12/15/2012*; 7:00 pm, LHN	Texas State	W 75–63	6–4	Frank Erwin Center (10,189); Austin, TX
12/19/2012*; 8:00 pm, ESPN2	No. 23 North Carolina	W 85–67	7–4	Frank Erwin Center (13,134); Austin, TX
12/22/2012*; 1:00 pm, ESPN2	at No. 20 Michigan State	L 56–67	7–5	Breslin Center (14,797); East Lansing, MI
12/29/2012*; 1:00 pm, LHN	Rice	W 57–41	8–5	Frank Erwin Center (10,943); Austin, TX
Big 12 regular season
01/05/2013; 1:00 pm, ESPNU	at Baylor	L 79–86 ^{OT}	8–6 (0–1)	Ferrell Center (7,749); Waco, TX
01/09/2013; 8:00 pm, ESPN2	West Virginia	L 53–57 ^{OT}	8–7 (0–2)	Frank Erwin Center (9,873); Austin, TX
01/12/2013; 1:00 pm, ESPNU	at Iowa State	L 62–82	8–8 (0–3)	Hilton Coliseum (14,376); Ames, IA
01/19/2013; 1:00 pm, CBS	No. 4 Kansas	L 59–64	8–9 (0–4)	Frank Erwin Center (14,312); Austin, TX
01/21/2013; 8:30 pm, ESPN	at Oklahoma	L 67–73	8–10 (0–5)	Lloyd Noble Center (10,409); Norman, OK
01/26/2013; 7:00 pm, LHN	Texas Tech	W 73–57	9–10 (1–5)	Frank Erwin Center (12,742); Austin, TX
01/30/2013; 7:00 pm, ESPN2	at No. 18 Kansas State	L 57–83	9–11 (1–6)	Bramlage Coliseum (12,109); Manhattan, KS
02/02/2013; 7:00 pm, LHN	TCU	W 60–43	10–11 (2–6)	Frank Erwin Center (11,641); Austin, TX
02/04/2013; 8:00 pm, ESPN	at West Virginia	L 58–60	10–12 (2–7)	WVU Coliseum (4,966); Morgantown, WV
02/09/2013; 12:45 pm, Big 12 Network	No. 22 Oklahoma State	L 59–72	10–13 (2–8)	Frank Erwin Center (14,036); Austin, TX
02/13/2013; 7:00 pm, Big 12 Network	Iowa State	W 89–86 ^{2OT}	11–13 (3–8)	Frank Erwin Center (9,729); Austin, TX
02/16/2013; 8:00 pm, ESPN	at No. 14 Kansas; ESPN College GameDay	L 47–73	11–14 (3–9)	Allen Fieldhouse (16,300); Lawrence, KS
02/19/2013; 7:00 pm, Big 12 Network	at TCU	W 68–59	12–14 (4–9)	Daniel-Meyer Coliseum (5,451); Fort Worth, TX
02/23/2013; 7:00 pm, LHN	No. 13 Kansas State	L 69–81	12–15 (4–10)	Frank Erwin Center (11,420); Austin, TX
02/27/2013; 8:00 pm, ESPN2	Oklahoma	W 92–86 ^{OT}	13–15 (5–10)	Frank Erwin Center (9,860); Austin, TX
03/02/2013; 3:00 pm, ESPN	at No. 15 Oklahoma State	L 65–78	13–16 (5–11)	Gallagher-Iba Arena (12,474); Stillwater, OK
03/04/2013; 8:00 pm, ESPN	Baylor	W 79–70	14–16 (6–11)	Frank Erwin Center (10,351); Austin, TX
03/09/2013; 3:00 pm, Big 12 Network	at Texas Tech	W 71–69 ^{OT}	15–16 (7–11)	United Spirit Arena (9,542); Lubbock, TX
2013 Big 12 men's basketball tournament
03/13/2013; 8:43 pm, Big 12 Network/ESPN3	vs. TCU; First Round	W 70–57	16–16	Sprint Center (17,018); Kansas City, MO
03/14/2013; 6:00 pm, Big 12 Network/ESPN3	vs. No. 11 Kansas State; Quarterfinals	L 49–66	16–17	Sprint Center (17,257); Kansas City, MO
2013 College Basketball Invitational
03/20/2013*; 8:00 pm, AXS TV	at Houston; First Round	L 72–73	16–18	Hofheinz Pavilion (4,407); Houston, TX
*Non-conference game. ^{#}Rankings from AP Poll / Coaches' Poll. (#) Tournament seedings in parentheses. All times are in Central Time.

== Roster ==
2012–13 Texas Longhorns men's basketball team
Players
Coaches

Pos.	#	Name	Height	Weight	Year	Previous school	Hometown
G	0	Dean Melchionni	6 ft 4 in (1.93 m)	193 lb (88 kg)	Sr	Germantown Academy	Lancaster, PA
G	1	Sheldon McClellan	6 ft 4 in (1.93 m)	188 lb (85 kg)	So	Bellaire	Houston, Texas
G	2	Demarcus Holland	6 ft 2 in (1.88 m)	170 lb (77 kg)	Fr	Naaman Forest	Garland, TX
G	3	Javan Felix	5 ft 10 in (1.78 m)	190 lb (86 kg)	Fr	St. Augustine	New Orleans, LA
F	4	Danny Newsome (redshirt)	6 ft 9 in (2.06 m)	180 lb (82 kg)	Fr	Langham Creek	Houston, TX
F	5	Jaylen Bond	6 ft 7 in (2.01 m)	224 lb (102 kg)	So	Plymouth-Whitemarsh	Norristown, PA
F	10	Jonathan Holmes	6 ft 7 in (2.01 m)	239 lb (108 kg)	So	Antonian College Prep	San Antonio, TX
G	12	Myck Kabongo	6 ft 1 in (1.85 m)	169 lb (77 kg)	So	St. Benedict's Prep	Toronto, Ontario
G	14	Julien Lewis	6 ft 3 in (1.91 m)	190 lb (86 kg)	So	La Marque	Galveston, TX
F	21	Connor Lammert	6 ft 9 in (2.06 m)	232 lb (105 kg)	Fr	Churchill	San Antonio, TX
G	22	Andrew Dick	6 ft 2 in (1.88 m)	180 lb (82 kg)	Sr	Sherman	Sherman, TX
F	33	Ioannis Papapetrou	6 ft 8 in (2.03 m)	225 lb (102 kg)	Fr	Florida Air Academy	Athens, Greece
F/C	44	Prince Ibeh	6 ft 10 in (2.08 m)	245 lb (111 kg)	Fr	Naaman Forest	Garland, TX
C	55	Cameron Ridley	6 ft 9 in (2.06 m)	270 lb (122 kg)	Fr	Bush	Richmond, TX

Head coach

- Rick Barnes (Lenoir–Rhyne)

Assistant coach(es)

- Rob Lanier (St. Bonaventure)
- Russell Springmann (Salisbury)
- Christopher Ogden (Texas)

Legend

- (C) Team captain
- (S) Suspended
- (I) Ineligible
- (W) Walk-on
- Injured
- Current redshirt

Roster
Last update: 2012-08-07
