= 2012–13 SMU Mustangs men's basketball team =

American college basketball season

2012–13 SMU Mustangs men's basketball
- Conference: Conference USA
- Record: 15–17 (5–11 C-USA)
- Head coach: Larry Brown (1st season)
- Assistant coaches: Tim Jankovich; Jerrance Howard; Ulric Maligi
- Home arena: Moody Coliseum

2012–13 Conference USA men's basketball standings
	Conf.				Overall
Team	W		L	PCT	W		L	PCT
No. 19 Memphis †	16	–	0	1.000	31	–	5	.861
Southern Miss	12	–	4	.750	27	–	10	.730
UTEP	10	–	6	.625	18	–	14	.563
East Carolina	9	–	7	.563	23	–	12	.657
UCF*	9	–	7	.563	20	–	11	.645
Tulsa	8	–	8	.500	17	–	16	.515
Houston	7	–	9	.438	20	–	13	.606
UAB	7	–	9	.438	16	–	17	.485
Tulane	6	–	10	.375	20	–	15	.571
Marshall	6	–	10	.375	13	–	19	.406
SMU	5	–	11	.313	15	–	17	.469
Rice	1	–	15	.063	5	–	26	.161
† 2013 C-USA tournament winner As of April 2, 2013; Rankings from AP poll *Ineligible for postseason play due to NCAA sanctions

The 2012–13 SMU Mustangs men's basketball team represented Southern Methodist University during the 2012–13 NCAA Division I men's basketball season. The Mustangs, led by first year head coach Larry Brown, played their home games at the Moody Coliseum and were members of Conference USA. They finished the season 15–17, 5–11 in C-USA play to finish in eleventh place. They lost in the first round of the Conference USA tournament to UAB.

This was the Mustangs last season as a member of C-USA as they joined the American Athletic Conference in July 2013.

== Roster ==
Number	Name	Position	Height	Weight	Year	Hometown
1	Ryan Manuel	Guard	6–4	175	Sophomore	Houston, Texas
2	Shawn Williams	Forward	6–7	225	Junior	Duncanville, Texas
4	Kevin Dunleavy, Jr.	Guard	6–3	180	Sophomore	New Providence, New Jersey
5	Uche Ofoegbu	Forward	6–4	200	Freshman	San Antonio, Texas
11	London Giles	Guard	6–3	185	Senior	Dallas, Texas
12	Nick Russell	Guard	6–4	200	Junior	Duncanville, Texas
13	Crandall Head	Guard	6–4	180	Junior	Matteson, Illinois
15	Cannen Cunningham	Center	6–9	220	Sophomore	Arlington, Texas
21	Jalen Jones	Guard	6–6	210	Sophomore	Dallas, Texas
22	Brian Bernardi	Guard	6–2	180	Freshman	New York City, New York
25	Garrett Wilson	Guard	6–0	170	Freshman	Katy, Texas
32	Jordan Dickerson	Center	7–0	240	Freshman	Brooklyn, New York
34	Nic Moore	Guard	5–7	170	Sophomore	Winona Lake, Indiana
35	DeAndre Coleman	Guard	6-1	185	Sophomore	Dallas, Texas
55	Blaise Mbargorba	Center	6–11	210	Freshman	Hightstown, New Jersey

== Schedule ==
Date time, TV	Opponent	Result	Record	Site (attendance) city, state
Non-conference regular season
November 11, 2012*; 6:00 pm	Loyola Marymount	W 73–58	1–0	Moody Coliseum (3,578); University Park, TX
November 15, 2012*; 7:00 pm, FSSW	at TCU	W 64–61	2–0	Daniel–Meyer Coliseum (4,145); Fort Worth, TX
November 17, 2012*; 7:00 pm	at Texas State	W 78–75	3–0	Strahan Coliseum (2,008); San Marcos, TX
November 19, 2012*; 8:00 pm	Malone; Hoops For Hope Classic	W 81–47	4–0	Moody Coliseum (2,821); University Park, TX
November 21, 2012*; 7:30 pm	Rider; Hoops For Hope Classic	W 83–70	5–0	Moody Coliseum (2,901); University Park, TX
November 24, 2012*; 8:30 pm	vs. Arkansas–Little Rock; Hoops for Hope Challenge	L 56–69	5–1	Puerto Vallarta International Convention Center (261); Puerto Vallarta, Mexico
November 25, 2012*; 6:00 pm	vs. Missouri State; Hoops for Hope Challenge	W 62–61	6–1	Puerto Vallarta International Convention Center (306); Puerto Vallarta, Mexico
November 28, 2012*; 7:00 pm	Utah	W 62–55	7–1	Moody Coliseum (3,501); University Park, TX
December 1, 2012*; 3:00 pm	at Hofstra	W 73–47	8–1	Mack Sports Complex (3,147); Hempstead, NY
December 15, 2012*; 1:00 pm	at Rhode Island	L 50–72	8–2	Ryan Center (3,822); Kingston, RI
December 18, 2012*; 8:00 pm, Pac-12	at Utah	L 53–62	8–3	Jon M. Huntsman Center (7,563); Salt Lake City, UT
December 21, 2012*; 8:00 pm	vs. Wagner; Cable Car Classic	L 53–63	8–4	Leavey Center (1,530); Santa Clara, CA
December 22, 2012*; 8:00 pm	vs. Alcorn State; Cable Car Classic	W 67–52	9–4	Leavey Center (1,523); Santa Clara, CA
December 30, 2012*; 4:00 pm	Furman	W 72–53	10–4	Moody Coliseum (2,858); University Park, TX
January 2, 2013*; 7:00 pm	Wyoming	L 56–59	10–5	Moody Coliseum (3,308); University Park, TX
Conference Regular Season
January 6, 2013; 7:00 pm, FSN	Tulsa	L 47–48	10–6 (0–1)	Moody Coliseum (3,590); University Park, TX
January 9, 2013; 7:00 pm	at Houston	L 67–78	10–7 (0–2)	Hofheinz Pavilion (3,123); Houston, TX
January 12, 2013; 2:00 pm	Tulane	W 59–53	11–7 (1–2)	Moody Coliseum (3,132); University Park, TX
January 16, 2013; 7:00 pm	Southern Miss	L 70–74	11–8 (1–3)	Moody Coliseum (3,207); University Park, TX
January 19, 2013; 3:00 pm, CSS	at UTEP	L 54–63	11–9 (1–4)	Don Haskins Center (8,154); El Paso, TX
January 26, 2013; 3:00 pm	at UCF	L 65–74	11–10 (1–5)	UCF Arena (4,638); Orlando, FL
January 30, 2013; 6:00 pm	at Marshall	W 68–57	12–10 (2–5)	Cam Henderson Center (5,407); Huntington, WV
February 2, 2013; 2:00 pm, TWCSTX	Houston	L 80–84 ^{OT}	12–11 (2–6)	Moody Coliseum (3,886); University Park, TX
February 6, 2013; 7:00 pm	Memphis	L 52–60	12–12 (2–7)	Moody Coliseum (5,170); University Park, TX
February 9, 2013; 7:00 pm	at Rice	W 61–39	13–12 (3–7)	Tudor Fieldhouse (2,256); Houston, TX
February 16, 2013; 1:30 pm, FSN	at Tulane	L 67–78	13–13 (3–8)	Avron B. Fogelman Arena (2,355); New Orleans, LA
February 23, 2013; 2:00 pm, TWCSTX	East Carolina	L 69–72	13–14 (3–9)	Moody Coliseum (3,642); University Park, TX
February 27, 2013; 7:00 pm, TWCSTX	Rice	W 67–55	14–14 (4–9)	Moody Coliseum (3,280); University Park, TX
March 2, 2013; 2:00 pm	at UAB	L 69–74	14–15 (4–10)	Bartow Arena (4,152); Birmingham, AL
March 6, 2013; 7:00 pm	at Tulsa	W 71–65	15–15 (5–10)	Reynolds Center (4,710); Tulsa, OK
March 9, 2013; 2:00 pm, TWCSTX	UTEP	L 63–76	15–16 (5–11)	Moody Coliseum (3,331); University Park, TX
2013 Conference USA men's basketball tournament
March 13, 2013; 3:30 pm	vs. UAB; First Round	L 52–53	15–17	BOK Center (5,743); Tulsa, OK
*Non-conference game. ^{#}Rankings from AP Poll. (#) Tournament seedings in parentheses. All times are in Central Time.
