= 2012–13 Southern Miss Golden Eagles basketball team =

American college basketball season

2012–13 Southern Miss Golden Eagles men's basketball

NIT, Quarterfinals
- Conference: Conference USA
- Record: 0–10, 27 wins vacated (0–4 C-USA, 12 wins vacated)
- Head coach: Donnie Tyndall (1st season)
- Assistant coaches: Wade O'Connor; Jareem Dowling; Adam Howard
- Home arena: Reed Green Coliseum

2012–13 Conference USA men's basketball standings
	Conf.				Overall
Team	W		L	PCT	W		L	PCT
No. 19 Memphis †	16	–	0	1.000	31	–	5	.861
Southern Miss	12	–	4	.750	27	–	10	.730
UTEP	10	–	6	.625	18	–	14	.563
East Carolina	9	–	7	.563	23	–	12	.657
UCF*	9	–	7	.563	20	–	11	.645
Tulsa	8	–	8	.500	17	–	16	.515
Houston	7	–	9	.438	20	–	13	.606
UAB	7	–	9	.438	16	–	17	.485
Tulane	6	–	10	.375	20	–	15	.571
Marshall	6	–	10	.375	13	–	19	.406
SMU	5	–	11	.313	15	–	17	.469
Rice	1	–	15	.063	5	–	26	.161
† 2013 C-USA tournament winner As of April 2, 2013; Rankings from AP poll *Ineligible for postseason play due to NCAA sanctions

The 2012–13 Southern Miss Golden Eagles men's basketball team represented the University of Southern Mississippi during the 2012–13 NCAA Division I men's basketball season. The Golden Eagles, led by first year head coach Donnie Tyndall, played their home games at Reed Green Coliseum and were members of Conference USA. They finished the season 27–10, 12–4 in C-USA play to finish in second place. They advanced to the championship game of the Conference USA tournament where they lost to Memphis in two overtimes. They received an invitation to the 2013 National Invitation Tournament where they Charleston Southern in the first round and Louisiana Tech in the second round before losing in the quarterfinals to BYU.

In 2016, the NCAA vacated all 27 wins (including 12 conference wins) due to participation of academically ineligible players.

== Roster ==
Number	Name	Position	Height	Weight	Year	Hometown
4	Dwayne Davis	Forward	6–5	205	Senior	Philadelphia, Pennsylvania
5	Neil Watson	Guard	5–11	170	Junior	Kansas City, Kansas
10	Cedric Jenkins	Guard	6–2	195	Junior	LaPlace, Louisiana
11	Daveon Boardingham	Forward	6–7	225	Junior	Newark, New Jersey
12	Rahard McGill	Guard	6–4	200	Senior	Havana, Florida
13	Chip Armelin	Guard	6–3	195	Sophomore	Sulphur, Louisiana
15	Deon Edwin	Guard	6–2	195	Freshman	British Virgin Islands
21	Norville Carey	Forward	6–5	230	Freshman	British Virgin Islands
22	Aaron Brown	Forward	6–5	210	Sophomore	Hackensack, New Jersey
23	Jerrold Brooks	Guard	6–0	185	Junior	Rochester, New York
24	Jonathan Mills	Forward	6–5	240	Senior	Chicago, Illinois
25	Jamie Chapman	Forward	6–3	175	Freshman	Mobile, Alabama
32	Christian Robbins	Forward	6–9	225	Freshman	Foxworth, Mississippi
34	Johnny Zuppardo	Forward	6–8	210	Sophomore	Metarie, Louisiana
44	Michael Craig	Forward	6–5	230	Junior	Phoenix, Arizona

== Schedule ==
Date time, TV	Rank^{#}	Opponent^{#}	Result	Record	Site (attendance) city, state
Exhibition
11/01/2012*; 7:30 pm		St. Catharine College	W 85–51	–	Reed Green Coliseum (3,129); Hattiesburg, MS
11/06/2012*; 8:15 pm		Charleston (WV)	W 72–58	–	Reed Green Coliseum (3,010); Hattiesburg, MS
Regular season
11/10/2012*; 7:30 pm		WKU	W 67–64 ^{OT}	1–0	Reed Green Coliseum (7,097); Hattiesburg, MS
11/15/2012*; 7:00 pm, FSN		at Georgia; Legends Classic	W 62–60 ^{OT}	2–0	Stegeman Coliseum (4,521); Athens, GA
11/19/2012*; 7:00 pm		at Sam Houston State; Legends Classic	W 61–49	3–0	Bernard Johnson Coliseum (1,089); Huntsville, TX
11/20/2012*; 5:00 pm		vs. UC Irvine; Legends Classic	W 69–65	4–0	Bernard Johnson Coliseum (502); Huntsville, TX
11/21/2012*; 5:00 pm		vs. Liberty; Legends Classic	W 74–56	5–0	Bernard Johnson Coliseum (224); Huntsville, TX
11/27/2012*; 7:00 pm		Denver	W 61–50	6–0	Reed Green Coliseum (3,597); Hattiesburg, MS
12/01/2012*; 8:00 pm, ESPN3		at New Mexico State	L 60–68	6–1	Pan American Center (5,206); Las Cruces, NM
12/4/2012*; 8:30 pm, Pac-12		at No. 8 Arizona	L 55–63	6–2	McKale Center (13,419); Tucson, AZ
12/08/2012*; 7:00 pm		at Louisiana Tech	L 55–65	6–3	Thomas Assembly Center (2,575); Ruston, LA
12/15/2012*; 6:30 pm		Grambling State	W 93–45	7–3	Reed Green Coliseum (3,297); Hattiesburg, MS
12/18/2012*; 6:00 pm		at Georgia State	W 69–67	8–3	GSU Sports Arena (1,167); Atlanta, GA
12/22/2012*; 7:00 pm		at Wichita State	L 51–59	8–4	Intrust Bank Arena (9,619); Wichita, KS
12/28/2012*; 6:30 pm		at Morehead State	W 94–58	9–4	Ellis Johnson Arena (3,012); Morehead, KY
12/31/2012*; 2:30 pm		William Carey	W 89–59	10–4	Reed Green Coliseum (4,077); Hattiesburg, MS
01/03/2013*; 7:00 pm		Dillard	W 135–41	11–4	Reed Green Coliseum (2,779); Hattiesburg, MS
01/09/2013; 7:00 pm		at Rice	W 75–52	12–4 (1–0)	Tudor Fieldhouse (1,411); Houston, TX
01/12/2013; 2:00 pm		Houston	W 73–54	13–4 (2–0)	Reed Green Coliseum (4,198); Hattiesburg, MS
01/16/2013; 7:00 pm		at SMU	W 74–70	14–4 (3–0)	Moody Coliseum (3,207); Dallas, TX
01/19/2013; 5:00 pm, CSS		UAB	W 74–59	15–4 (4–0)	Reed Green Coliseum (5,863); Hattiesburg, MS
01/23/2013; 6:00 pm, CSS		Marshall	W 102–46	16–4 (5–0)	Reed Green Coliseum (4,106); Hattiesburg, MS
01/26/2013; 3:05 pm		at Tulsa	W 62–59	17–4 (6–0)	Reynolds Center (5,230); Tulsa, OK
02/02/2013; 7:00 pm, CSS		at UAB	W 79–75	18–4 (7–0)	Bartow Arena (5,103); Birmingham, AL
02/06/2013; 6:00 pm		at UCF	L 58–60	18–5 (7–1)	UCF Arena (4,648); Orlando, FL
02/09/2013; 3:00 pm, CBSSN		Memphis	L 76–89	18–6 (7–2)	Reed Green Coliseum (7,864); Hattiesburg, MS
02/13/2013; 7:00 pm		Tulane	W 71–60	19–6 (8–2)	Reed Green Coliseum (3,701); Hattiesburg, MS
02/16/2013; 4:00 pm		at East Carolina	W 86–82 ^{OT}	20–6 (9–2)	Williams Arena at Minges Coliseum (6,011); Greenville, NC
02/20/2013; 7:00 pm		UTEP	W 45–39	21–6 (10–2)	Reed Green Coliseum (3,701); Hattiesburg, MS
02/23/2013; 12:00 pm, FSN		No. 21 Memphis	L 73–89	21–7 (10–3)	FedExForum (17,857); Memphis, TN
03/02/2013; 7:00 pm		East Carolina	W 88–69	22–7 (11–3)	Reed Green Coliseum (4,151); Hattiesburg, MS
03/05/2013; 6:00 pm, CBSSN		at Marshall	L 84–88	22–8 (11–4)	Cam Henderson Center (5,364); Huntington, WV
03/09/2013; 7:00 pm		UCF	W 70–62	23–8 (12–4)	Reed Green Coliseum (3,774); Hattiesburg, MS
2013 Conference USA tournament
03/14/2013; 12:00 pm, CBSSN		vs. UAB; Quarterfinals	W 81–66	24–8	BOK Center (5,976); Tulsa, OK
03/15/2013; 3:00 pm, CBSSN		vs. UTEP; Semifinals	W 85–67	25–8	BOK Center (8,006); Tulsa, OK
03/16/2013; 10:30 am, CBS		vs. No. 20 Memphis; Championship Game	L 79–91 ^{2OT}	25–9	BOK Center (7,019); Tulsa, OK
2013 NIT
03/20/2013*; 8:15 pm, ESPN3	No. (1)	(8) Charleston Southern; First Round	W 78–71	26–9	Reed Green Coliseum (5,018); Hattiesburg, MS
03/25/2013*; 9:00 pm, ESPNU	No. (1)	(5) Louisiana Tech; Second Round	W 63–52	27–9	Reed Green Coliseum (5,922); Hattiesburg, MS
03/27/2013*; 7:00 pm, ESPNU	No. (1)	(3) BYU; Quarterfinals	L 62–79	27–10	Reed Green Coliseum (7,679); Hattiesburg, MS
*Non-conference game. ^{#}Rankings from AP Poll. (#) Tournament seedings in parentheses. All times are in Central Time. (#) during NIT is Seed within Region.
