= 2012–13 UAB Blazers men's basketball team =

American college basketball season

2012–13 UAB Blazers men's basketball
- Conference: Conference USA
- Record: 16–17 (7–9 C-USA)
- Head coach: Jerod Haase (1st season)
- Assistant coaches: Robert Ehsan; Richie Riley; Jeff Wulbrun
- Home arena: Bartow Arena

2012–13 Conference USA men's basketball standings
	Conf.				Overall
Team	W		L	PCT	W		L	PCT
No. 19 Memphis †	16	–	0	1.000	31	–	5	.861
Southern Miss	12	–	4	.750	27	–	10	.730
UTEP	10	–	6	.625	18	–	14	.563
East Carolina	9	–	7	.563	23	–	12	.657
UCF*	9	–	7	.563	20	–	11	.645
Tulsa	8	–	8	.500	17	–	16	.515
Houston	7	–	9	.438	20	–	13	.606
UAB	7	–	9	.438	16	–	17	.485
Tulane	6	–	10	.375	20	–	15	.571
Marshall	6	–	10	.375	13	–	19	.406
SMU	5	–	11	.313	15	–	17	.469
Rice	1	–	15	.063	5	–	26	.161
† 2013 C-USA tournament winner As of April 2, 2013; Rankings from AP poll *Ineligible for postseason play due to NCAA sanctions

The 2012–13 UAB Blazers men's basketball team represented the University of Alabama at Birmingham during the 2012–13 NCAA Division I men's basketball season. The Blazers, led by first year head coach Jerod Haase, played their home games at Bartow Arena and were members of Conference USA. They finished the season 16–17, 7–9 in C-USA play to finish in a tie for seventh place. They lost in the quarterfinals of the Conference USA tournament to Southern Miss.

== Roster ==
Number	Name	Position	Height	Weight	Year	Hometown
00	Alexander Scotland-Williamson	Forward	6–9	235	Senior	London, England
3	Terence Jones	Guard	6–2	185	Senior	Baltimore, Maryland
5	Robert Williams	Guard	6–4	210	Junior	Greenville, Mississippi
10	Jekore Tyler	Guard	6–3	185	Senior	Port Arthur, Texas
12	K.C. Whitaker	Guard	6–6	185	Sophomore	Ashburn, Virginia
15	Fahro Alihodzic	Center	6–10	240	Junior	Vlasenica, Bosnia
23	Isiah Jones	Guard	6–4	193	Sophomore	Pulaski, Illinois
24	Preston Purifoy	Guard	6–5	220	Junior	Conway, Arkansas
25	Quincy Taylor	Guard	6–0	180	Junior	Wichita, Kansas
42	Rod Rucker	Forward	6–5	220	Junior	Elberton, Georgia
44	Jordan Swing	Forward	6–6	200	Junior	Birmingham, Alabama

== Schedule ==
Date time, TV	Opponent	Result	Record	Site (attendance) city, state
Exhibition
11/03/2012*; 2:00 pm	North Alabama	W 98–81	–	Bartow Arena (2,058); Birmingham, AL
Regular season
11/10/2012*; 8:00 pm	Young Harris	W 105–59	1–0	Bartow Arena (3,823); Birmingham, AL
11/14/2012*; 7:05 pm, ESPN3	at No. 15 Creighton	L 60–77	1–1	CenturyLink Center Omaha (15,755); Omaha, NE
11/18/2012*; 3:00 pm	Navy; South Padre Island Invitational	W 82–63	2–1	Bartow Arena (3,851); Birmingham, AL
11/20/2012*; 7:00 pm	Prairie View A&M; South Padre Island Invitational	W 76–70	3–1	Bartow Arena (3,391); Birmingham, AL
11/23/2012*; 5:00 pm	vs. Illinois State; South Padre Island Invitational semifinals	L 65–77	3–2	South Padre Island Convention Centre (N/A); South Padre Island, TX
11/24/2012*; 4:00 pm, CBSSN	vs. TCU; South Padre Island Invitational 3rd place game	L 73–76	3–3	South Padre Island Convention Centre (N/A); South Padre Island, TX
11/27/2012*; 7:00 pm	at Troy	W 75–55	4–3	Trojan Arena (2,576); Troy, AL
12/01/2012*; 5:00 pm, ESPNU	at No. 14 North Carolina	L 84–102	4–4	Dean Smith Center (15,906); Chapel Hill, NC
12/05/2012*; 7:00 pm, ESPN3	at Middle Tennessee	L 64–84	4–5	Murphy Center (4,587); Murfreesboro, TN
12/08/2012*; 7:00 pm	South Alabama	W 92–78	5–5	Bartow Arena (3,755); Birmingham, AL
12/16/2012*; 11:00 am	at Rutgers	L 79–88	5–6	The RAC (4,679); Piscataway, NJ
12/20/2012*; 7:00 pm	Louisiana–Monroe	W 76–69	6–6	Bartow Arena (3,248); Birmingham, AL
12/29/2012*; 2:00 pm	Northeastern	W 83–63	7–6	Bartow Arena (3,527); Birmingham, AL
01/02/2013*; 7:00 pm	Georgia Southern	W 65–61	8–6	Bartow Arena (3,189); Birmingham, AL
01/05/2013*; 6:00 pm	at Dayton	L 71–78	8–7	UD Arena (12,455); Dayton, OH
01/09/2013; 6:00 pm	at UCF	L 48–64	8–8 (0–1)	UCF Arena (6,185); Orlando, FL
01/12/2013; 7:30 pm, CSS	Memphis	L 53–69	8–9 (0–2)	Bartow Arena (8,107); Birmingham, AL
01/19/2013; 5:00 pm, CSS	at Southern Miss	L 59–74	8–10 (0–3)	Reed Green Coliseum (5,863); Hattiesburg, MS
01/23/2013; 7:00 pm	East Carolina	L 85–91	8–11 (0–4)	Bartow Arena (3,233); Birmingham, AL
01/26/2013; 5:00 pm	at Houston	L 61–66	8–12 (0–5)	Hofheinz Pavilion (3,135); Houston, TX
01/30/2013; 7:00 pm	UTEP	W 78–72 ^{OT}	9–12 (1–5)	Bartow Arena (3,121); Birmingham, AL
02/02/2013; 7:00 pm, CSS	Southern Miss	L 75–79	9–13 (1–6)	Bartow Arena (5,103); Birmingham, AL
02/06/2013; 7:05 pm	at Tulsa	W 70–63	10–13 (2–6)	Reynolds Center (4,147); Tulsa, OK
02/09/2013; 2:00 pm	Marshall	W 75–61	11–13 (3–6)	Bartow Arena (4,328); Birmingham, AL
02/13/2013; 6:00 pm	at East Carolina	L 61–74	11–14 (3–7)	Williams Coliseum (4,324); Greenville, SC
02/16/2013; 7:00 pm	Rice	W 80–57	12–14 (4–7)	Bartow Arena (5,176); Birmingham, AL
02/23/2013; 6:00 pm	at Marshall	W 52–48	13–14 (5–7)	Cam Henderson Center (6,614); Huntington, WV
02/27/2013; 7:00 pm	at Tulane	W 76–71	14–14 (6–7)	Avron B. Fogelman Arena (1,639); New Orleans, LA
03/02/2013; 2:00 pm	SMU	W 74–69	15–14 (7–7)	Bartow Arena (4,152); Birmingham, AL
03/06/2013; 6:00 pm, CSS	UCF	L 70–74	15–15 (7–8)	Bartow Arena (3,759); Birmingham, AL
03/09/2013; 11:00 am, CBSSN	at No. 25 Memphis	L 71–86	15–16 (7–9)	FedExForum (18,289); Memphis, TN
2013 Conference USA men's basketball tournament
03/13/2013; 3:30 pm	vs. SMU; First Round	W 53–52	16–16	BOK Center (5,743); Tulsa, OK
03/14/2013; 12:00 pm, CBSSN	vs. Southern Miss; Quarterfinals	L 66–81	16–17	BOK Center (5,976); Tulsa, OK
*Non-conference game. ^{#}Rankings from AP Poll. (#) Tournament seedings in parentheses. All times are in Central Time.
