= 2012–13 Memphis Tigers men's basketball team =

American college basketball season

2012–13 Memphis Tigers men's basketball

C-USA Regular Season & Tournament Champions

NCAA Tournament, Round of 32
- Conference: Conference USA

Ranking
- Coaches: No. 18
- AP: No. 19
- Record: 31–5 (16–0 C-USA)
- Head coach: Josh Pastner (4th year)
- Assistant coaches: Damon Stoudamire; Aki Collins; Jimmy Williams
- Home arena: FedExForum

2012–13 Conference USA men's basketball standings
| | Conf. | | | | Overall |
| Team | W | | L | PCT | W | | L | PCT |
|---|---|---|---|---|---|---|---|---|
| No. 19 Memphis † | 16 | – | 0 | 1.000 | 31 | – | 5 | .861 |
| Southern Miss | 12 | – | 4 | .750 | 27 | – | 10 | .730 |
| UTEP | 10 | – | 6 | .625 | 18 | – | 14 | .563 |
| East Carolina | 9 | – | 7 | .563 | 23 | – | 12 | .657 |
| UCF* | 9 | – | 7 | .563 | 20 | – | 11 | .645 |
| Tulsa | 8 | – | 8 | .500 | 17 | – | 16 | .515 |
| Houston | 7 | – | 9 | .438 | 20 | – | 13 | .606 |
| UAB | 7 | – | 9 | .438 | 16 | – | 17 | .485 |
| Tulane | 6 | – | 10 | .375 | 20 | – | 15 | .571 |
| Marshall | 6 | – | 10 | .375 | 13 | – | 19 | .406 |
| SMU | 5 | – | 11 | .313 | 15 | – | 17 | .469 |
| Rice | 1 | – | 15 | .063 | 5 | – | 26 | .161 |
† 2013 C-USA tournament winner As of April 2, 2013; Rankings from AP poll *Ineligible for postseason play due to NCAA sanctions

The 2012–13 Memphis Tigers men's basketball team represented the University of Memphis in the 2012–13 NCAA Division I men's basketball season, the 92nd season of Tiger basketball. The Tigers were coached by head coach Josh Pastner, who was assisted by Damon Stoudamire, Jimmy Williams and Aki Collins. Stoudamire and Williams both assisted Pastner in 2011–12, and Collins left Marquette in May 2012 to join Pastner's staff. The Tigers played their home games at the FedExForum in Memphis. The 2012–13 season was the final season the Tigers participated in Conference USA before joining the American Athletic Conference in 2013–14. They finished the season 31–5, 16–0 in C-USA play to be Conference USA regular season champions. They also were champions of the Conference USA tournament, winning the championship game in two overtimes vs Southern Miss, to earn an automatic bid to the 2013 NCAA tournament. In the tournament, they defeated Saint Mary's in the second round before losing in the third round to Michigan State.

== Pre-season ==
The 2011–12 Memphis Tigers finished the season with a record of 26–9 (13–3 C-USA). The Tigers won the regular season C-USA title as well as the 2012 Conference USA men's basketball tournament to secure a berth in the 2012 NCAA Division I men's basketball tournament where they lost in the second round to Saint Louis.

In the off-season, the Tigers lost rising junior Will Barton to the NBA. However, rising sophomore Adonis Thomas, who projected as a possible first-round draft pick, decided to return to Memphis for his second season with the Tigers.

The 2012–13 Tigers were ranked 17th in the pre-season AP poll and 16th in the pre-season coaches poll. On November 9, 2012, junior Geron Johnson was suspended by the NCAA for the season's first three games.

=== Departures ===
- #5 Will Barton, sophomore guard, NBA draft, Portland Trail Blazers
- #31 Preston Laird, senior guard
- #11 Wesley Witherspoon, senior forward

=== Transfers ===
| Name | Pos. | Height | Weight | Year | Hometown | Notes |
|---|---|---|---|---|---|---|
| Charles Carmouche | G | 6' 2" | 175 | Senior | New Orleans, Louisiana | Transferred to Louisiana State University |
| Drew Barham | G/F | 6'7" | 195 | RS Junior | Memphis, TN | Transferred to Gonzaga University |

=== Recruiting ===
The Tigers signed wing Damien Wilson and power forward Shaq Goodwin in their 2012 recruiting class. After signing with Memphis, Goodwin was selected as a McDonald's All-American. The Tigers also received a commitment from junior college transfer Geron Johnson, a shooting guard. Johnson was rated as the best junior college player in the country and has two years of eligibility in Division 1.

College recruiting information
| Name | Hometown | School | Height | Weight | Commit date |
|---|---|---|---|---|---|
| Shaquille Goodwin; PF | Decatur, GA | Southwest DeKalb | 6 ft 8 in (2.03 m) | 245 lb (111 kg) | Nov 8, 2011 |
| Shaquille Goodwin; PF | Recruit ratings: Scout: Rivals: (96) | | | | |
| Geron Johnson; SG | Dayton, OH | Dunbar High/Garden City C.C. | 6 ft 4 in (1.93 m) | 190 lb (86 kg) | Feb 10, 2012 |
| Geron Johnson; SG | Recruit ratings: Scout: Rivals: (JC) | | | | |
| Damien Wilson; SF | Austell, GA | Oak Hill | 6 ft 6 in (1.98 m) | 190 lb (86 kg) | May 14, 2011 |
| Damien Wilson; SF | Recruit ratings: Scout: Rivals: (92) | | | | |
Overall recruit ranking:
Note: In many cases, Scout, Rivals, 247Sports, On3, and ESPN may conflict in their listings of height and weight.; In these cases, the average was taken. ESPN grades are on a 100-point scale.; Sources: "Memphis Basketball Commitments". Rivals.; "2011 Memphis Basketball Commits". Scout.; "ESPN". ESPN.; "Scout.com Team Recruiting Rankings". Scout.; "2012 Team Ranking". Rivals.

== Season summary ==
The Tigers began the season ranked 17th in the AP poll, marking the third year in a row that the Tigers entered the season in the top 25. The Tigers were also the consensus favorite to win the 2013 Conference USA championship.

The Tigers' roster was dominated by a fairly large junior class, including guard Joe Jackson, guard Chris Crawford, guard Antonio Barton, forward Tarik Black, and walk on guard Trey Draper. Guard Geron Johnson was also a junior in his first season with Memphis.

In the early season Battle 4 Atlantis tournament, Memphis entered with high expectations. However, without Geron Johnson due to suspension in their first game, Memphis was beaten by unranked VCU and unranked Minnesota in its first two Atlantis games before defeating Northern Iowa. Minnesota guard and Memphis native Andre Hollins scored 41 points against his hometown team, while Memphis guard Joe Jackson was limited to 7 minutes of playing time. VCU and Minnesota both went on to be ranked in the AP top 25 after the tournament. The Atlantis results were disappointing for a Tiger squad which did not have a large number of difficult out of conference opponents remaining on its schedule.

A positive note from the Tigers' trip to the Bahamas was the emergence of forward D.J. Stephens. Stephens, a senior, had been used sparingly while battling injuries and asthma during his first 3 years with the Tigers. Previously known for his extraordinary leaping ability and athleticism who would see time on the floor to bring energy to the team, Stephens began to demonstrate his all-around game, scoring 15 and grabbing 7 rebounds against Minnesota while seeing more than 20 minutes of playing time per game.

In late November, junior captain Tarik Black walked out of practice and did not play in the Tigers' game against UT Martin as a result. Black, whose playing time had decreased, was reportedly considering a transfer, though he came back to the team and finished out the season with the Tigers before announcing his intention to transfer as a graduate at season's end.

On December 15, the Tigers faced the only ranked opponent left on their regular season schedule, #6 Louisville. The Tigers opened a large lead in the first half against the Cardinals and were up by 7 at halftime. However, the veteran Cardinals defeated Memphis in the end, with Joe Jackson leading the Tigers with 23 points. Louisville went on to win the 2013 national championship.

After the December 15 home loss to Louisville, however, the Tigers began a winning streak that persisted for over two months. Wins during that stretch included at Tennessee, Harvard, at Southern Miss, and UCF. Guard Antonio Barton suffered a foot fracture in the road victory over Southern Miss on February 9. Riding a 14-game winning streak, the Tigers reentered the top 25 in both polls on February 11, 2013.

With a win over Southern Miss on February 23, Memphis clinched the regular season Conference USA title. The Tigers finished the season undefeated in Conference USA play. Junior Joe Jackson was named CUSA player of the year and coach Josh Pastner was named coach of the year in the conference. Senior DJ Stephens finished the season as the CUSA blocks leader and was named defensive player of the year. Freshman Shaq Goodwin was named to the all freshman team, junior Chris Crawford the sixth man of the year, Jackson to the all conference first team, and three Tigers (sophomore Adonis Thomas, junior Geron Johnson, and Stephens) to the all conference third team.

The Tigers defeated 2 seed Southern Miss in the CUSA tournament final in double overtime. Chris Crawford was named the tournament MVP, having set a career high in 3 pointers made (7) and points (30) in the Tigers semi-final game against Tulsa and scoring 20+ points in each of the Tigers' three tournament games.

Memphis was given a 6 seed in the Midwest region of the 2013 NCAA tournament. The Tigers defeated 11 seed St. Mary's in the round of 64 before losing to 3 seed Michigan State in the round of 32.

== Roster ==
2012–13 Memphis Tigers men's basketball team
Players
Coaches

| Pos. | # | Name | Height | Weight | Year | Hometown |
|---|---|---|---|---|---|---|
| F | 0 | Ferrakohn Hall | 6 ft 8 in (2.03 m) | 220 lb (100 kg) | Sr | Memphis, Tennessee |
| G | 1 | Joe Jackson (C) | 6 ft 1 in (1.85 m) | 171 lb (78 kg) | Jr | Memphis, Tennessee |
| G | 2 | Antonio Barton | 6 ft 2 in (1.88 m) | 178 lb (81 kg) | Jr | Baltimore, Maryland |
| G | 3 | Chris Crawford (C) | 6 ft 4 in (1.93 m) | 218 lb (99 kg) | Jr | Memphis, Tennessee |
| G/F | 4 | Adonis Thomas | 6 ft 7 in (2.01 m) | 240 lb (109 kg) | So | Memphis, Tennessee |
| F | 5 | Shaq Goodwin | 6 ft 8 in (2.03 m) | 246 lb (112 kg) | Fr | Decatur, Georgia |
| C | 10 | Tarik Black (C) | 6 ft 9 in (2.06 m) | 262 lb (119 kg) | Jr | Memphis, Tennessee |
| G | 11 | Damon Wilson | 6 ft 6 in (1.98 m) | 180 lb (82 kg) | Fr | Mableton, Georgia |
| G | 12 | Anthony Cole | 6 ft 0 in (1.83 m) | 184 lb (83 kg) | Fr | Arlington, Tennessee |
| F | 14 | Hippolyte Tsafack | 6 ft 8 in (2.03 m) | 235 lb (107 kg) | RS So | Yaoundé, Cameroon |
| G | 15 | Trey Draper | 5 ft 10 in (1.78 m) | 170 lb (77 kg) | Jr | Memphis, Tennessee |
| G | 23 | Charles Holt | 5 ft 10 in (1.78 m) | 175 lb (79 kg) | Sr | Jackson, Tennessee |
| G/F | 30 | D. J. Stephens | 6 ft 5 in (1.96 m) | 188 lb (85 kg) | Sr | Killeen, Texas |
| C | 32 | Stan Simpson | 6 ft 10 in (2.08 m) | 236 lb (107 kg) | Sr | Carterville, Illinois |
| G | 55 | Geron Johnson | 6 ft 5 in (1.96 m) | 177 lb (80 kg) | Jr | Dayton, Ohio |

Head coach

- Josh Pastner (Arizona)

Assistant coach(es)

- Damon Stoudamire (Arizona)
- David "Aki" Collins (Clark Atlanta)
- Jimmy Williams (Ashland)

Legend

- (C) Team captain
- (S) Suspended
- (I) Ineligible
- (W) Walk-on
- Injured
- Current redshirt

Roster
Last update: Sept 5, 2012

== Schedule ==
| Date time, TV | Rank^{#} | Opponent^{#} | Result | Record | Site (attendance) city, state |
Exhibition
| 11/07/2012*; 7:00 pm | No. 17 | Christian Brothers | W 65–54 | – | FedEx Forum; Memphis, TN |
Regular season
| 11/12/2012*; 6:30 pm, CSS | No. 17 | North Florida | W 81–66 | 1–0 | FedEx Forum (15,668); Memphis, TN |
| 11/17/2012*; 7:00 pm | No. 17 | Samford; Battle 4 Atlantis Opening Game | W 65–54 | 2–0 | FedEx Forum (16,275); Memphis, TN |
| 11/22/2012*; 6:00 pm, NBCSN | No. 19 | vs. VCU; Battle 4 Atlantis Quarterfinal | L 65–78 | 2–1 | Atlantis Resort (3,258); Nassau, Bahamas |
| 11/23/2012*; 12:00 pm, AXS TV | No. 19 | vs. Minnesota; Battle 4 Atlantis Consolation Round | L 75–84 | 2–2 | Atlantis Resort (1,462); Nassau, Bahamas |
| 11/24/2012*; 12:00 pm, AXS TV | No. 19 | vs. Northern Iowa; Battle 4 Atlantis 7th place game | W 52–47 | 3–2 | Atlantis Resort (1,113); Nassau, Bahamas |
| 11/29/2012*; 7:00 pm, FSSO/SPSO | | Tennessee–Martin | W 93–65 | 4–2 | FedEx Forum (15,398); Memphis, TN |
| 12/05/2012*; 6:00 pm, CBSSN | | Ohio | W 84–58 | 5–2 | FedEx Forum (15,669); Memphis, TN |
| 12/08/2012*; 12:00 pm, FSSO/SPSO | | Austin Peay | W 83–65 | 6–2 | FedEx Forum (15,249); Memphis, TN |
| 12/15/2012*; 1:30 pm, FSN | | No. 6 Louisville | L 78–87 | 6–3 | FedEx Forum (18,392); Memphis, TN |
| 12/20/2012*; 7:00 pm, FSSO/SPSO | | Lipscomb | W 62–56 | 7–3 | FedEx Forum (15,454); Memphis, TN |
| 12/28/2012*; 7:00 pm, CSS | | Oral Roberts | W 72–57 | 8–3 | FedEx Forum (16,410); Memphis, TN |
| 12/30/2012*; 7:00 pm, CSS | | Loyola | W 78–64 | 9–3 | FedEx Forum (16,455); Memphis, TN |
| 01/04/2013*; 7:00 pm, ESPN2 | | at Tennessee | W 85–80 | 10–3 | Thompson–Boling Arena (19,535); Knoxville, TN |
| 01/09/2013; 7:00 pm, FSSO/SPSO | | East Carolina | W 67–54 | 11–3 (1–0) | FedEx Forum (15,341); Memphis, TN |
| 01/12/2013; 7:30 pm, CSS | | UAB | W 69–53 | 12–3 (2–0) | Bartow Arena (8,107); Birmingham, AL |
| 01/16/2013; 6:00 pm, CSS | | at Rice | W 77–51 | 13–3 (3–0) | Tudor Fieldhouse (1,837); Houston, TX |
| 01/19/2013*; 11:30 am, FSN | | Harvard | W 60–50 | 14–3 | FedEx Forum (16,204); Memphis, TN |
| 01/22/2013; 7:00 pm, FSSO/SPSO | | Tulane | W 71–60 | 15–3 (4–0) | FedEx Forum (15,466); Memphis, TN |
| 01/26/2013; 1:00 pm, FSN | | Marshall | W 73–72 | 16–3 (5–0) | FedEx Forum (16,386); Memphis, TN |
| 01/30/2013; 6:00 pm | | at East Carolina | W 75–68 | 17–3 (6–0) | Williams Arena at Minges Coliseum (6,246); Greenville, NC |
| 02/02/2013; 1:00 pm, CBSSN | | Tulsa | W 94–64 | 18–3 (7–0) | FedEx Forum (16,196); Memphis, TN |
| 02/06/2013; 7:00 pm | | at SMU | W 60–52 | 19–3 (8–0) | Moody Coliseum (5,170); Dallas, TX |
| 02/09/2013; 3:00 pm, CBSSN | | at Southern Miss | W 89–76 | 20–3 (9–0) | Reed Green Coliseum (7,864); Hattiesburg, MS |
| 02/13/2013; 7:00 pm, CBSSN | No. 22 | UCF | W 93–71 | 21–3 (10–0) | FedEx Forum (16,544); Memphis, TN |
| 02/16/2013; 7:00 pm, CBSSN | No. 22 | at Marshall | W 71–59 | 22–3 (11–0) | Cam Henderson Center (6,116); Huntington, WV |
| 02/20/2013; 8:00 pm, CSS | No. 21 | Houston | W 81–74 | 23–3 (12–0) | FedEx Forum (16,791); Memphis, TN |
| 02/23/2013; 12:00 pm, FSN | No. 21 | Southern Miss | W 89–73 | 24–3 (13–0) | FedEx Forum (17,857); Memphis, TN |
| 02/26/2013*; 6:00 pm, ESPN2 | No. 19 | at Xavier | L 62–64 | 24–4 | Cintas Center (9,475); Cincinnati, OH |
| 03/02/2013; 12:00 pm, FSN | No. 19 | at UCF | W 76–67 | 25–4 (14–0) | UCF Arena (6,447); Orlando, FL |
| 03/05/2013; 8:00 pm, CBSSN | No. 25 | at UTEP | W 56–54 | 26–4 (15–0) | Don Haskins Center (11,581); El Paso, TX |
| 03/09/2013; 11:00 am, CBSSN | No. 25 | UAB | W 86–71 | 27–4 (16–0) | FedEx Forum (18,289); Memphis, TN |
2013 Conference USA men's basketball tournament
| 03/14/2013; 6:00 pm, CBSSN | (1) No. 20 | vs. (8) Tulane; Quarterfinals | W 81–68 | 28–4 | BOK Center (7,050); Tulsa, OK |
| 03/15/2013; 5:45 pm, CBSSN | (1) No. 20 | vs. (5) Tulsa; Semifinals | W 85–74 | 29–4 | BOK Center (8,006); Tulsa, OK |
| 03/16/2013; 10:30 am, CBS | (1) No. 20 | vs. (2) Southern Miss; Championship Game | W 91–79 ^{2OT} | 30–4 | BOK Center (7,019); Tulsa, OK |
2013 NCAA tournament
| 03/21/2013*; 1:45 pm, CBS | (6 MW) No. 19 | vs. No. 11 MW Saint Mary's; Second Round | W 54–52 | 31–4 | The Palace of Auburn Hills (18,863); Auburn Hills, MI |
| 03/23/2013*; 1:45 pm, CBS | (6 MW) No. 19 | vs. (3 MW) No. 9 Michigan State; Third Round | L 48–70 | 31–5 | The Palace of Auburn Hills (21,723); Auburn Hills, MI |
*Non-conference game. ^{#}Rankings from AP Poll. (#) Tournament seedings in parentheses. All times are in Central Time. (#) during NCAA Tournament is seed with Region MW=Midwest.

== Rankings ==
Ranking movement Legend: ██ Increase in ranking. ██ Decrease in ranking. (rv) Received votes but unranked.
| Poll | Pre | Wk 1 | Wk 2 | Wk 3 | Wk 4 | Wk 5 | Wk 6 | Wk 7 | Wk 8 | Wk 9 | Wk 10 | Wk 11 | Wk 12 | Wk 13 | Wk 14 | Wk 15 | Wk 16 | Wk 17 | Wk 18 | Wk 19 | Final |
|---|---|---|---|---|---|---|---|---|---|---|---|---|---|---|---|---|---|---|---|---|---|
| AP | 17 | 17 | 17 | 19 | rv | – | – | – | – | – | – | – | rv | rv | rv | 22 | 21 | 19 | 25 | 20 | 19 |
| Coaches | 16 | 16 | 16 | 17 | rv | rv | – | – | – | – | – | – | – | – | rv | 25 | 19 | 17 | 20 | 17 | 15 |
