= 2012–13 Marshall Thundering Herd men's basketball team =

American college basketball season

2012–13 Marshall Thundering Herd men's basketball
- Conference: Conference USA
- Record: 13–19 (6–10 C-USA)
- Head coach: Tom Herrion (3rd season)
- Assistant coaches: Mark Cline; Dino Presley; Josh King
- Home arena: Cam Henderson Center

2012–13 Conference USA men's basketball standings
| | Conf. | | | | Overall |
| Team | W | | L | PCT | W | | L | PCT |
|---|---|---|---|---|---|---|---|---|
| No. 19 Memphis † | 16 | – | 0 | 1.000 | 31 | – | 5 | .861 |
| Southern Miss | 12 | – | 4 | .750 | 27 | – | 10 | .730 |
| UTEP | 10 | – | 6 | .625 | 18 | – | 14 | .563 |
| East Carolina | 9 | – | 7 | .563 | 23 | – | 12 | .657 |
| UCF* | 9 | – | 7 | .563 | 20 | – | 11 | .645 |
| Tulsa | 8 | – | 8 | .500 | 17 | – | 16 | .515 |
| Houston | 7 | – | 9 | .438 | 20 | – | 13 | .606 |
| UAB | 7 | – | 9 | .438 | 16 | – | 17 | .485 |
| Tulane | 6 | – | 10 | .375 | 20 | – | 15 | .571 |
| Marshall | 6 | – | 10 | .375 | 13 | – | 19 | .406 |
| SMU | 5 | – | 11 | .313 | 15 | – | 17 | .469 |
| Rice | 1 | – | 15 | .063 | 5 | – | 26 | .161 |
† 2013 C-USA tournament winner As of April 2, 2013; Rankings from AP poll *Ineligible for postseason play due to NCAA sanctions

The 2012–13 Marshall Thundering Herd men's basketball team represented Marshall University during the 2012–13 NCAA Division I men's basketball season. The Thundering Herd, led by third year head coach Tom Herrion, played their home games at the Cam Henderson Center and were members of Conference USA. They finished the season 13–19, 6–10 in C-USA play to finish in a tie for ninth place. They lost in the first round of the Conference USA tournament to Tulane.

== Preseason ==
=== Recruiting ===
College recruiting information
| Name | Hometown | School | Height | Weight | Commit date |
|---|---|---|---|---|---|
| Ryan Taylor; SF | Louisville, KY | Hargrave Military Academy | 6 ft 6 in (1.98 m) | 205 lb (93 kg) | May 15, 2012 |
| Ryan Taylor; SF | Recruit ratings: Scout: Rivals: (POST) | | | | |
| Kareem Canty; PG | Harlem, NY | Faith Baptist Christian | 6 ft 1 in (1.85 m) | 188 lb (85 kg) | Oct 2, 2011 |
| Kareem Canty; PG | Recruit ratings: Scout: Rivals: (88) | | | | |
| Tamron Manning; SG | Georgetown, KY | Scott County High School | 6 ft 3 in (1.91 m) | 185 lb (84 kg) | Oct 5, 2011 |
| Tamron Manning; SG | Recruit ratings: Scout: Rivals: (88) | | | | |
| Elijah Pittman; PF | Philadelphia, Pennsylvania | Lamar State College | 6 ft 8 in (2.03 m) | 220 lb (100 kg) | Oct 30, 2011 |
| Elijah Pittman; PF | Recruit ratings: Scout: Rivals: (JC) | | | | |
| D.D. Scarver; SG | Birmingham, AL | Trinity Valley CC | 6 ft 4 in (1.93 m) | 180 lb (82 kg) | May 16, 2012 |
| D.D. Scarver; SG | Recruit ratings: Scout: Rivals: (JC) | | | | |
Overall recruit ranking: Scout: NR Rivals: NR ESPN: NR
Note: In many cases, Scout, Rivals, 247Sports, On3, and ESPN may conflict in their listings of height and weight.; In these cases, the average was taken. ESPN grades are on a 100-point scale.; Sources: "2012 Team Ranking". Rivals.

== Roster ==
2012–13 Marshall Thundering Herd men's basketball team
Players
Coaches

| Pos. | # | Name | Height | Weight | Year | Hometown |
|---|---|---|---|---|---|---|
| G | 0 | Chris Martin | 6 ft 0 in (1.83 m) | 185 lb (84 kg) | So | Upper Marlboro, Maryland |
| F | 1 | Dennis Tinnon | 6 ft 8 in (2.03 m) | 232 lb (105 kg) | Sr | Green Bay, Wisconsin |
| F | 2 | Robert Goff | 6 ft 9 in (2.06 m) | 240 lb (109 kg) | Sr | Indianapolis, Indiana |
| F | 4 | Jamir Hanner | 6 ft 8 in (2.03 m) | 210 lb (95 kg) | So | Philadelphia, Pennsylvania |
| C | 11 | Nigel Spikes | 6 ft 10 in (2.08 m) | 230 lb (104 kg) | RS Sr | Fort Lauderdale, Florida |
| G | 12 | Kareem Canty (I) | 6 ft 1 in (1.85 m) | 180 lb (82 kg) | Fr | Harlem, New York |
| G | 15 | DeVince Boykins | 6 ft 4 in (1.93 m) | 211 lb (96 kg) | RS Fr | Forest City, North Carolina |
| F | 21 | TyQuane Goard | 6 ft 7 in (2.01 m) | 206 lb (93 kg) | So | Charleston, West Virginia |
| G/F | 23 | D.D. Scarver | 6 ft 4 in (1.93 m) | 202 lb (92 kg) | Jr | Birmingham, Alabama |
| F | 24 | Elijah Pittman | 6 ft 9 in (2.06 m) | 219 lb (99 kg) | Fr | Covington, Kentucky |
| C | 31 | JP Kambola | 6 ft 9 in (2.06 m) | 240 lb (109 kg) | RS So | Toronto, Ontario, Canada |
| G | 32 | Tamron Manning | 6 ft 4 in (1.93 m) | 200 lb (91 kg) | Fr | Georgetown, Kentucky |
| C | 34 | Yous Mbao | 7 ft 2 in (2.18 m) | 249 lb (113 kg) | RS Jr | Rufisque, Senegal |
| G | 35 | Austin Loop | 6 ft 4 in (1.93 m) | 202 lb (92 kg) | Fr | South Webster, Ohio |
| G | 50 | DeAndre Kane | 6 ft 4 in (1.93 m) | 200 lb (91 kg) | RS Jr | Pittsburgh, Pennsylvania |

Head coach

- Tom Herrion (Merrimack)

Assistant coach(es)

- Mark Cline (Wake Forest)
- Dino Presley (Kutztown)
- Josh King (Eckerd)

Legend

- (C) Team captain
- (S) Suspended
- (I) Ineligible
- (W) Walk-on
- Injured
- Current redshirt

Roster
Last update: 2012-10-14

== Schedule ==
| Date time, TV | Opponent | Result | Record | Site (attendance) city, state |
Exhibition
| 11/01/2012*; 8:00 pm | Bluefield College | W 94–67 | | Cam Henderson Center (4,631); Huntington, WV |
Regular season
| 11/09/2012*; 7:30 pm | Longwood | W 81–47 | 1–0 | Cam Henderson Center (5,472); Huntington, WV |
| 11/11/2012*; 1:00 pm, ESPN3 | at Villanova; 2K Sports Classic | L 68–80 | 1–1 | The Pavilion (6,500); Villanova, PA |
| 11/16/2012*; 4:30 pm | vs. U of DC; 2K Sports Classic | W 80–58 | 2–1 | Mack Sports Complex (3,142); Hempstead, NY |
| 11/17/2012*; 2:30 pm | vs. South Dakota State; 2K Sports Classic | L 77–78 | 2–2 | Mack Sports Complex (2,076); Hempstead, NY |
| 11/18/2012*; 3:00 pm | at Hofstra; 2K Sports Classic | L 100–103 ^{2OT} | 2–3 | Mack Sports Complex (1,276); Hempstead, NY |
| 11/24/2012*; 7:00 pm | Nevada | W 89–82 | 3–3 | Cam Henderson Center (5,583); Huntington, WV |
| 11/28/2012*; 7:00 pm | Morehead State | W 70–67 | 4–3 | Cam Henderson Center (5,877); Huntington, WV |
| 12/01/2012*; 7:00 pm | UNC Wilmington | W 61–58 | 5–3 | Cam Henderson Center (5,689); Huntington, WV |
| 12/05/2012*; 7:30 pm, WOWK | vs. West Virginia; Chesapeake Energy Capital Classic | L 59–69 | 5–4 | Charleston Civic Center (11,512); Charleston, WV |
| 12/08/2012*; 7:00 pm | Coppin State | W 69–63 | 6–4 | Cam Henderson Center (5,152); Huntington, WV |
| 12/15/2012*; 2:00 pm, CBSSN | vs. No. 11 Cincinnati | L 56–72 | 6–5 | Charleston Civic Center (5,432); Charleston, WV |
| 12/19/2012*; 7:00 pm | Savannah State | W 64–48 | 7–5 | Cam Henderson Center (5,316); Huntington, WV |
| 12/22/2012*; 4:00 pm, ESPN2 | at Kentucky | L 54–82 | 7–6 | Rupp Arena (24,271); Lexington, KY |
| 01/02/2013*; 7:00 pm | Delaware State | L 51–53 | 7–7 | Cam Henderson Center (5,039); Huntington, WV |
| 01/05/2013*; 2:00 pm | at Ohio | L 57–94 | 7–8 | Convocation Center (6,971); Athens, OH |
| 01/09/2013; 7:00 pm | Tulsa | W 79–61 | 8–8 (1–0) | Cam Henderson Center (5,115); Huntington, WV |
| 01/12/2013; 9:00 pm | at UTEP | L 63–74 | 8–9 (1–1) | Don Haskins Center (8,519); El Paso, TX |
| 01/19/2013; 7:00 pm | East Carolina | W 77–56 | 9–9 (2–1) | Cam Henderson Center (6,056); Huntington, WV |
| 01/23/2013; 7:00 pm, CSS | at Southern Miss | L 46–102 | 9–10 (2–2) | Reed Green Coliseum (4,106); Hattiesburg, MS |
| 01/26/2013; 2:00 pm, FSN | at Memphis | L 72–73 | 9–11 (2–3) | FedEx Forum (16,386); Memphis, TN |
| 01/30/2013; 7:00 pm | SMU | L 57–68 | 9–12 (2–4) | Cam Henderson Center (5,407); Huntington, WV |
| 02/02/2013; 2:00 pm, CSS | UCF | W 75–71 | 10–12 (3–4) | Cam Henderson Center (5,856); Huntington, WV |
| 02/06/2013; 8:00 pm | at Tulane | L 75–91 | 10–13 (3–5) | Avron B. Fogelman Arena (2,158); New Orleans, LA |
| 02/09/2013; 3:00 pm | at UAB | L 61–75 | 10–14 (3–6) | Bartow Arena (4,328); Birmingham, AL |
| 02/13/2013; 7:00 pm | Rice | W 71–70 | 11–14 (4–6) | Cam Henderson Center (5,308); Huntington, WV |
| 02/16/2013; 8:00 pm, CBSSN | No. 22 Memphis | L 59–71 | 11–15 (4–7) | Cam Henderson Center (6,116); Huntington, WV |
| 02/20/2013; 7:00 pm | at UCF | W 82–70 | 12–15 (5–7) | UCF Arena (4,739); Orlando, FL |
| 02/23/2013; 7:00 pm | UAB | L 48–52 | 12–16 (5–8) | Cam Henderson Center (6,614); Huntington, WV |
| 03/02/2013; 2:00 pm, CSS | at Houston | L 76–103 | 12–17 (5–9) | Hofheinz Pavilion (3,935); Houston, TX |
| 03/05/2013; 7:00 pm, CBSSN | Southern Miss | W 88–84 | 13–17 (6–9) | Cam Henderson Center (5,364); Huntington, WV |
| 03/09/2013; 5:00 pm | at East Carolina | L 79–86 | 13–18 (6–10) | Williams Arena (5,377); Greenville, NC |
2013 Conference USA men's basketball tournament
| 03/13/2013; 9:30 pm | vs. Tulane; First Round | L 64–66 | 13–19 | BOK Center (5,743); Tulsa, OK |
*Non-conference game. ^{#}Rankings from AP poll. (#) Tournament seedings in parentheses. All times are in Eastern Time.
