= 2012–13 Tulane Green Wave men's basketball team =

American college basketball season

2012–13 Tulane Green Wave men's basketball
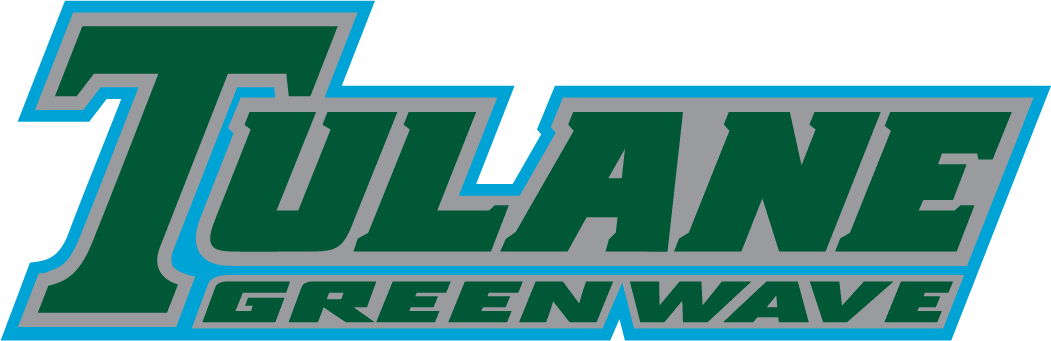

CIT, Second Round
- Conference: Conference USA
- Record: 20–15 (6–10 C-USA)
- Head coach: Ed Conroy (3rd season)
- Assistant coaches: Doug Novak; Andy Fox; Jeff Strohm
- Home arena: Devlin Fieldhouse

2012–13 Conference USA men's basketball standings
| | Conf. | | | | Overall |
| Team | W | | L | PCT | W | | L | PCT |
|---|---|---|---|---|---|---|---|---|
| No. 19 Memphis † | 16 | – | 0 | 1.000 | 31 | – | 5 | .861 |
| Southern Miss | 12 | – | 4 | .750 | 27 | – | 10 | .730 |
| UTEP | 10 | – | 6 | .625 | 18 | – | 14 | .563 |
| East Carolina | 9 | – | 7 | .563 | 23 | – | 12 | .657 |
| UCF* | 9 | – | 7 | .563 | 20 | – | 11 | .645 |
| Tulsa | 8 | – | 8 | .500 | 17 | – | 16 | .515 |
| Houston | 7 | – | 9 | .438 | 20 | – | 13 | .606 |
| UAB | 7 | – | 9 | .438 | 16 | – | 17 | .485 |
| Tulane | 6 | – | 10 | .375 | 20 | – | 15 | .571 |
| Marshall | 6 | – | 10 | .375 | 13 | – | 19 | .406 |
| SMU | 5 | – | 11 | .313 | 15 | – | 17 | .469 |
| Rice | 1 | – | 15 | .063 | 5 | – | 26 | .161 |
† 2013 C-USA tournament winner As of April 2, 2013; Rankings from AP poll *Ineligible for postseason play due to NCAA sanctions

The 2012–13 Tulane Green Wave men's basketball team represented Tulane University during the 2012–13 NCAA Division I men's basketball season. The Green Wave, led by third-year head coach Ed Conroy, played their home games at Devlin Fieldhouse and were members of Conference USA. They finished the season 20–15, 6–10 in C-USA play to finish in three way tie for ninth place.

They lost in the quarterfinals of the Conference USA tournament to Memphis. They were invited to the 2013 CIT where they defeated South Alabama in the first round before losing in the second round to Bradley.

== Roster ==
| Number | Name | Position | Height | Weight | Year | Hometown |
|---|---|---|---|---|---|---|
| 00 | Josh Davis | F | 6'8" | 215 | Sophomore | Raleigh, NC |
| 2 | Ricky Tarrant | G | 6'2" | 190 | Sophomore | Pleasant Grove, AL |
| 3 | Louis Dabney | G | 6'3" | 210 | Freshman | New Orleans, LA |
| 4 | Ben Cherry | G | 6'2" | 180 | Senior | Charlotte, NC |
| 5 | Jordan Callahan | G | 6'0" | 190 | Senior | Marietta, GA |
| 11 | Kajon Mack | G | 6'3" | 185 | Freshman | Gardena, CA |
| 12 | Max Keenan | G | 6'2" | 185 | Sophomore | Washington, D.C. |
| 13 | Josh Birchfield | C | 6'8" | 255 | Sophomore | Charleston, WV |
| 15 | RaAnthony Sanders | G | 6'4" | 200 | Freshman | Holt, AL |
| 20 | Kevin Thomas | F | 6'9" | 225 | Junior | Waco, TX |
| 21 | Marc-Eddy Norelia | F | 6'7" | 210 | Freshman | Orlando, FL |
| 22 | Kendall Timmons | G | 6'5" | 215 | Senior | Fort Worth, TX |
| 24 | Jay Hook | G | 6'7" | 178 | Sophomore | Waco, TX |
| 25 | Lotanna Nwogbo | F/C | 6'8" | 255 | Sophomore | Lithonia, GA |
| 34 | Trevante Drye | F | 6'6" | 218 | Sophomore | Baton Rouge, LA |
| 41 | Tomas Bruha | C | 7'0" | 235 | RS Junior | Prague, Czech Republic |

== Schedule ==
| Date time, TV | Opponent | Result | Record | Site (attendance) city, state |
Regular season
| 11/09/2012*; 6:00 pm, ESPN3 | at Georgia Tech | L 61–79 | 0–1 | McCamish Pavilion (8,600); Atlanta, GA |
| 11/13/2012*; 7:00 pm | Bethune-Cookman; Joe Cipriano Nebraska Classic | W 65–55 | 1–1 | Devlin Fieldhouse (1,651); New Orleans, LA |
| 11/16/2012*; 12:30 pm | Nebraska–Omaha; Joe Cipriano Nebraska Classic | W 76–52 | 2–1 | Devlin Fieldhouse (2,637); New Orleans, LA |
| 11/18/2012*; 1:00 pm | Chicago State; Joe Cipriano Nebraska Classic | W 79–51 | 3–1 | Devlin Fieldhouse (1,749); New Orleans, LA |
| 11/21/2012*; 7:00 pm | at Nebraska; Joe Cipriano Nebraska Classic | L 57–61 | 3–2 | Bob Devaney Sports Center (9,133); Lincoln, NE |
| 11/24/2012*; 7:00 pm | Southern | W 68–65 | 4–2 | Devlin Fieldhouse (1,606); New Orleans, LA |
| 11/27/2012*; 7:00 pm | Loyola (New Orleans) | W 69–57 | 5–2 | Devlin Fieldhouse (2,136); New Orleans, LA |
| 12/01/2012*; 3:00 pm | Navy | W 51–41 | 6–2 | Devlin Fieldhouse (1,609); New Orleans, LA |
| 12/04/2012*; 7:00 pm | Nicholls State | W 65–48 | 7–2 | Devlin Fieldhouse (1,378); New Orleans, LA |
| 12/08/2012*; 8:00 pm | at San Diego | L 72–78 | 7–3 | Jenny Craig Pavilion (2,182); San Diego, CA |
| 12/19/2012*; 7:20 pm | Texas–Pan American; Tulane Classic | W 76–49 | 8–3 | Devlin Fieldhouse (1,502); New Orleans, LA |
| 12/20/2012*; 7:00 pm | Pepperdine; Tulane Classic | W 69–54 | 9–3 | Devlin Fieldhouse (1,571); New Orleans, LA |
| 12/22/2012*; 2:00 pm | vs. Hofstra; Brooklyn Hoops Holiday Invitational | W 83–62 | 10–3 | Barclays Center (N/A); Brooklyn, NY |
| 12/30/2012*; 5:00 pm, ESPNU | at Alabama | W 53–50 | 11–3 | Coleman Coliseum (12,445); Tuscaloosa, AL |
| 01/04/2013*; 7:00 pm | Wofford | W 62–48 | 12–3 | Devlin Fieldhouse (1,928); New Orleans, LA |
| 01/09/2013; 7:00 pm | UTEP | L 57–66 | 12–4 (0–1) | Devlin Fieldhouse (2,029); New Orleans, LA |
| 01/12/2013; 2:00 pm | at SMU | L 53–59 | 12–5 (0–2) | Moody Coliseum (3,132); Dallas, TX |
| 01/19/2013; 1:00 pm, CST | Tulsa | W 75–72 | 13–5 (1–2) | Devlin Fieldhouse (2,147); New Orleans, LA |
| 01/22/2013; 7:00 pm, SPSO | at Memphis | L 60–71 | 13–6 (1–3) | FedEx Forum (15,466); Memphis, TN |
| 01/26/2013; 1:00 pm, CSS | Rice | W 73–66 | 14–6 (2–3) | Devlin Fieldhouse (1,698); New Orleans, LA |
| 01/30/2013; 7:00 pm | UCF | L 50–58 | 14–7 (2–4) | Devlin Fieldhouse (2,030); New Orleans, LA |
| 02/02/2013; 8:00 pm | at UTEP | L 50–62 | 14–8 (2–5) | Don Haskins Center (9,014); El Paso, TX |
| 02/06/2013; 7:00 pm | Marshall | W 91–75 | 15–8 (3–5) | Devlin Fieldhouse (2,158); New Orleans, LA |
| 02/09/2013; 1:00 pm, CSS | at Houston | W 88–85 | 16–8 (4–5) | Hofheinz Pavilion (3,307); Houston, TX |
| 02/13/2013; 7:00 pm | at Southern Miss | L 60–71 | 16–9 (4–6) | Reed Green Coliseum (3,701); Hattiesburg, MS |
| 02/16/2013; 1:30 pm, FSN | SMU | W 78–67 | 17–9 (5–6) | Devlin Fieldhouse (2,355); New Orleans, LA |
| 02/23/2013; 7:00 pm | at Rice | W 89–64 | 18–9 (6–6) | Tudor Fieldhouse (2,477); Houston, TX |
| 02/27/2013; 7:00 pm | UAB | L 71–76 | 18–10 (6–7) | Devlin Fieldhouse (1,639); New Orleans, LA |
| 03/02/2013; 3:05 pm | at Tulsa | L 66–78 | 18–11 (6–8) | Reynolds Center (5,089); Tulsa, OK |
| 03/06/2013; 6:00 pm | at East Carolina | L 85–88 | 18–12 (6–9) | Williams Arena (4,461); Greenville, NC |
| 03/09/2013; 7:00 pm | Houston | L 94–96 | 18–13 (6–10) | Devlin Fieldhouse (1,670); New Orleans, LA |
2013 Conference USA men's basketball tournament
| 03/13/2013; 8:30 pm | vs. Marshall; First Round | W 66–64 | 19–13 | BOK Center (5,743); Tulsa, OK |
| 03/14/2013; 6:00 pm, CBSSN | vs. No. 20 Memphis; Quarterfinals | L 68–81 | 19–14 | BOK Center (7,050); Tulsa, OK |
2013 CIT
| 03/20/2013*; 7:00 pm | South Alabama; First Round | W 84–73 | 20–14 | Devlin Fieldhouse (1,682); New Orleans, LA |
| 03/23/2013*; 7:00 pm | at Bradley; Second Round | L 72–77 | 20–15 | Renaissance Coliseum (1,897); Peoria, IL |
*Non-conference game. ^{#}Rankings from AP Poll. (#) Tournament seedings in parentheses. All times are in Central Time.
