= 2012–13 UTEP Miners men's basketball team =

American college basketball season

2012–13 UTEP Miners men's basketball
- Conference: Conference USA
- Record: 18–14 (10–6 C-USA)
- Head coach: Tim Floyd (3rd season)
- Assistant coaches: Phil L. Johnson; Ken DeWeese; Greg Foster
- Home arena: Don Haskins Center

2012–13 Conference USA men's basketball standings
	Conf.				Overall
Team	W		L	PCT	W		L	PCT
No. 19 Memphis †	16	–	0	1.000	31	–	5	.861
Southern Miss	12	–	4	.750	27	–	10	.730
UTEP	10	–	6	.625	18	–	14	.563
East Carolina	9	–	7	.563	23	–	12	.657
UCF*	9	–	7	.563	20	–	11	.645
Tulsa	8	–	8	.500	17	–	16	.515
Houston	7	–	9	.438	20	–	13	.606
UAB	7	–	9	.438	16	–	17	.485
Tulane	6	–	10	.375	20	–	15	.571
Marshall	6	–	10	.375	13	–	19	.406
SMU	5	–	11	.313	15	–	17	.469
Rice	1	–	15	.063	5	–	26	.161
† 2013 C-USA tournament winner As of April 2, 2013; Rankings from AP poll *Ineligible for postseason play due to NCAA sanctions

The 2012–13 UTEP Miners basketball team represented the University of Texas at El Paso during the 2012–13 NCAA Division I men's basketball season. The Miners, led by third year head coach Tim Floyd, played their home games at the Don Haskins Center and were members of Conference USA. They finished the season 18–14, 10–6 in C-USA play to finish in third place. They advanced to the semifinals of the Conference USA tournament where they lost to Southern Miss. Despite the 18 wins, they did not participate in a postseason tournament. UTEP averaged 8,490 fans per game, ranking 52nd nationally.

== Roster ==
Number	Name	Position	Height	Weight	Year	Hometown
2	Jalen Ragland	Guard/Forward	6–6	175	Sophomore	Chillicothe, Ohio
4	Julian Washburn	Guard/Forward	6–7	205	Sophomore	Duncanville, Texas
5	C.J. Cooper	Guard	6–0	170	Sophomore	La Verne, California
11	Jacques Streeter	Guard	6–0	175	Senior	Los Angeles, California
13	McKenzie Moore	Guard	6–6	190	Sophomore	Pleasant Hill, California
21	John Bohannon	Center	6–10	210	Junior	Lancaster, Texas
23	Hooper Vint	Center	6–10	220	Freshman	Van Buren, Arkansas
24	Tyler Tafoya	Guard	6–3	160	Senior	El Paso, Texas
25	Konner Tucker	Guard	6–4	185	Senior	Fort Worth, Texas
31	Cedrick Lang	Forward	6–9	225	Sophomore	Sioux Falls, South Dakota
32	Chris Washburn	Forward	6–8	240	Freshman	Grand Prairie, Texas
33	Twymond Howard	Guard/Forward	6–6	210	Freshman	Pearl, Mississippi
41	Matt Willms	Center	7–1	210	Freshman	Leamington, Ontario
44	Malcolm Moore	Forward	6–7	220	Senior	Iowa City, Iowa

== Schedule ==
Date time, TV	Opponent	Result	Record	Site (attendance) city, state
Exhibition
11/03/2012*; 7:00 pm	Southeastern Oklahoma	W 70–63	–	Don Haskins Center (6,518); El Paso, TX
Regular season
11/09/2012*; 7:00 pm	Oral Roberts	W 69–49	1–0	Don Haskins Center (8,564); El Paso, TX
11/15/2012*; 8:00 pm, FSN	at No. 12 Arizona	L 51–72	1–1	McKale Center (13,576); Tucson, AZ
11/22/2012*; 5:00 pm, ESPN2	vs. Oklahoma; Old Spice Classic First Round	L 61–68	1–2	HP Field House (2,076); Orlando, FL
11/23/2012*; 3:30 pm, ESPN2	vs. Clemson; Old Spice Classic consolation round	L 48–69	1–3	HP Field House (2,205); Orlando, FL
11/25/2012*; 12:00 pm, ESPN3	vs. Vanderbilt; Old Spice Classic 7th place game	L 49–73	1–4	HP Field House (1,080); Orlando, FL
11/28/2012*; 7:00 pm	New Mexico State	W 55–54	2–4	Don Haskins Center (9,366); El Paso, TX
12/08/2012*; 7:00 pm	Idaho	W 64–60	3–4	Don Haskins Center (8,039); El Paso, TX
12/17/2012*; 6:00 pm, CBSSN	No. 21 UNLV	L 60–62	3–5	Don Haskins Center (9,027); El Paso, TX
12/19/2012*; 6:00 pm, CBSSN	Oregon	W 91–84 ^{3OT}	4–5	Don Haskins Center (8,512); El Paso, TX
12/22/2012*; 7:25 pm	Arkansas-Pine Bluff; Sun Bowl Invitational semifinals	W 83–61	5–5	Don Haskins Center (7,132); El Paso, TX
12/23/2012*; 7:00 pm	Nebraska; Sun Bowl Invitational championship	W 68–52	6–5	Don Haskins Center (7,532); El Paso, TX
01/02/2013*; 8:00 pm, CBSSN	at Colorado State	L 58–62	6–6	Moby Arena (3,571); Fort Collins, CO
01/09/2013; 6:00 pm	at Tulane	W 66–57	7–6 (1–0)	Devlin Fieldhouse (2,029); New Orleans, LA
01/12/2013; 7:00 pm	Marshall	W 74–63	8–6 (2–0)	Don Haskins Center (8,519); El Paso, TX
01/14/2013*; 7:00 pm	Houston Baptist	W 72–44	9–6	Don Haskins Center (6,608); El Paso, TX
01/16/2013; 6:05 pm	at Tulsa	L 42–45	9–7 (2–1)	Reynolds Center (4,333); Tulsa, OK
01/19/2013; 2:00 pm, CSS	SMU	W 63–54	10–7 (3–1)	Don Haskins Center (8,154); El Paso, TX
01/26/2013; 5:00 pm	at East Carolina	W 68–67	11–7 (4–1)	Williams Coliseum (6,121); Greenville, SC
01/30/2013; 6:00 pm	at UAB	L 72–78 ^{OT}	11–8 (4–2)	Bartow Arena (3,121); Birmingham, AL
02/02/2013; 7:00 pm	Tulane	W 62–50	12–8 (5–2)	Don Haskins Center (9,014); El Paso, TX
02/06/2013; 7:00 pm	Rice	W 65–53	13–8 (6–2)	Don Haskins Center (7,223); El Paso, TX
02/09/2013; 7:00 pm	Tulsa	L 70–74	13–9 (6–3)	Don Haskins Center (9,811); El Paso, TX
02/13/2013; 6:00 pm	at Houston	L 61–79	13–10 (6–4)	Hofheinz Pavilion (3,159); Houston, TX
02/16/2013; 7:00 pm	UCF	W 73–58	14–10 (7–4)	Don Haskins Center (8,926); El Paso, TX
02/20/2013; 6:00 pm	at Southern Miss	L 39–45	14–11 (7–5)	Reed Green Coliseum (3,701); Hattiesburg, MS
02/23/2013*; 7:00 pm, ESPN3	at New Mexico State	L 51–55	14–12	Pan American Center (10,729); Las Cruces, NM
02/27/2013; 7:00 pm	Houston	W 63–53	15–12 (8–5)	Don Haskins Center (7,835); El Paso, TX
03/02/2013; 12:00 pm	at Rice	W 67–56	16–12 (9–5)	Tudor Fieldhouse (2,037); Houston, TX
03/05/2013; 7:00 pm, CBSSN	No. 25 Memphis	L 54–56	16–13 (9–6)	Don Haskins Center (11,581); El Paso, TX
03/09/2013; 1:00 pm	at SMU	W 76–63	17–13 (10–6)	Moody Coliseum (3,331); Dallas, TX
2013 Conference USA men's basketball tournament
03/14/2013; 1:40 pm, CBSSN	vs. Houston; Quarterfinals	W 80–69	18–13	BOK Center (5,976); Tulsa, OK
03/15/2013; 2:00 pm, CBSSN	vs. Southern Miss; Semifinals	L 67–85	18–14	BOK Center (8,006); Tulsa, OK
*Non-conference game. ^{#}Rankings from AP Poll. (#) Tournament seedings in parentheses. All times are in Mountain Time.
