= 2012–13 TCU Horned Frogs men's basketball team =

American college basketball season

2012–13 TCU Horned Frogs men's basketball
- Conference: Big 12 Conference
- Record: 11–21 (2–16 Big 12)
- Head coach: Trent Johnson (1st season)
- Assistant coaches: Donny Guerinoni; Brent Scott; Pooh Williamson
- Home arena: Daniel–Meyer Coliseum

2012–13 Big 12 men's basketball standings
	Conf.				Overall
Team	W		L	PCT	W		L	PCT
No. 3 Kansas †	14	–	4	.778	31	–	6	.838
No. 12 Kansas State	14	–	4	.778	27	–	8	.771
No. 17 Oklahoma State	13	–	5	.722	24	–	9	.727
Oklahoma	11	–	7	.611	20	–	12	.625
Iowa State	11	–	7	.611	23	–	12	.657
Baylor	9	–	9	.500	23	–	14	.622
Texas	7	–	11	.389	16	–	18	.471
West Virginia	6	–	12	.333	13	–	19	.406
Texas Tech	3	–	15	.167	11	–	20	.355
TCU	2	–	16	.111	11	–	21	.344
† 2013 Big 12 Tournament winner Rankings from AP poll

The 2012–13 TCU Horned Frogs basketball team represented Texas Christian University in the 2012–13 NCAA Division I men's basketball season. This was head coach Trent Johnson's first season at TCU. They played their home games at Daniel–Meyer Coliseum in Fort Worth, Texas and were in their first season as members of the Big 12 Conference. They finished the season 11–21, 2–16 in Big 12 play to finish in last place. They lost in the first round of the Big 12 tournament to Texas. On February 8, 2013, TCU earned their first ever Big 12 conference victory with a 62–55 upset win over 5th ranked Kansas. The win was also TCU's first over an opponent ranked in the top 5.

== Before the Season ==
=== Departures ===
Name	Number	Pos.	Height	Weight	Year	Hometown	Notes
Hank Thorns	10	G	5'9"	165	Senior	Las Vegas, Nevada	Graduated
Cheick Kone	13	C	6'10"	235	Junior	Bamako, Mali	Graduated
J. R. Cadot	23	G	6'5"	205	Senior	Nassau, Bahamas	Graduated
Marin Bavcevic	31	G	6'0"	185	Senior	Split, Croatia	Graduated
Craig Williams	41	F	6'8"	240	Senior	Christiansted, U. S. Virgin Islands	Graduated

=== Recruits ===
College recruiting
Name	Hometown	School	Height	Weight	Commit date
Aaron Durley; C	Houston, TX	Bush	6 ft 9 in (2.06 m)	260 lb (120 kg)	Apr 30, 2012
Aaron Durley; C	Recruit ratings: Scout: Rivals: (82)				
Charles Hill; SG	Fort Worth, TX	Trimble Technical	6 ft 2 in (1.88 m)	180 lb (82 kg)	Oct 14, 2011
Charles Hill; SG	Recruit ratings: Scout: Rivals: (82)				
Clyde Smith; SG	Lakeville, CT	Hotchkiss School	6 ft 2 in (1.88 m)	185 lb (84 kg)	Oct 17, 2011
Clyde Smith; SG	Recruit ratings: Scout: Rivals: (82)				
Overall recruit ranking: Scout: Not Ranked Rivals: Not Ranked ESPN: Not Ranked
Note: In many cases, Scout, Rivals, 247Sports, On3, and ESPN may conflict in their listings of height and weight.; In these cases, the average was taken. ESPN grades are on a 100-point scale.; Sources: "TCU 2012 Basketball Commitments". Rivals.; "2012 TCU Basketball Commits". Scout.; "ESPN". ESPN.; "Scout.com Team Recruiting Rankings". Scout.; "2012 Team Ranking". Rivals.

== Roster ==
2012–13 TCU Horned Frogs men's basketball team
Players
Coaches

Pos.	#	Name	Height	Weight	Year	Previous school	Hometown
G	0	Charles Hill Jr.	6 ft 2 in (1.88 m)	180 lb (82 kg)	Fr	Trimble Tech	Ft. Worth, TX
G	1	Jarvis Ray	6 ft 6 in (1.98 m)	195 lb (88 kg)	Jr	O. Perry Walker	New Orleans, LA
F	2	Connell Crossland	6 ft 7 in (2.01 m)	190 lb (86 kg)	Sr	Hazelwood Central; John A. Logan College	St. Louis, MO
G	3	Clyde Smith III	6 ft 2 in (1.88 m)	185 lb (84 kg)	Fr	Hotchkiss School	Houston, TX
F	4	Amric Fields	6 ft 9 in (2.06 m)	210 lb (95 kg)	Jr	Putnam West	Oklahoma City, OK
G	5	Kyan Anderson	5 ft 11 in (1.8 m)	175 lb (79 kg)	So	North Crowley	Ft. Worth, TX
G	11	Thomas Montigel	6 ft 2 in (1.88 m)	190 lb (86 kg)	Jr	Paschal	Ft. Worth, TX
G	21	Nate Butler	6 ft 6 in (1.98 m)	200 lb (91 kg)	Sr	Mississippi Elite Christian Academy; John A. Logan College	Dorado, Puerto Rico
F	23	Devonta Abrom	6 ft 8 in (2.03 m)	255 lb (116 kg)	So	Seagoville; Arkansas	Dallas, TX
F	24	Adrick McKinney	6 ft 8 in (2.03 m)	250 lb (113 kg)	Sr	Trimble Tech; Angelina College	Ft. Worth, TX
G	25	Chris Zurcher	6 ft 01 in (1.85 m)	165 lb (75 kg)	Jr	Johnson	San Antonio, TX
G	31	Christian Gore	6 ft 2 in (1.88 m)	175 lb (79 kg)	So	Franklin; Brown	El Paso, TX
F	33	Garlon Green	6 ft 7 in (2.01 m)	210 lb (95 kg)	Sr	Hightower	Missouri City, TX
C	44	Aaron Durley	6 ft 10 in (2.08 m)	270 lb (122 kg)	Fr	Bush	Houston, TX

Head coach

- Trent Johnson (Boise State)

Assistant coach(es)

- Donny Guerinoni (Nevada)
- Brent Scott (Rice)
- Pooh Williamson (Tulsa)

Legend

- (C) Team captain
- (S) Suspended
- (I) Ineligible
- (W) Walk-on
- Injured
- Current redshirt

== Schedule and results ==
Date time, TV	Rank^{#}	Opponent^{#}	Result	Record	Site (attendance) city, state
Regular season
11/09/2012*; 6:00 pm, FSSW+		Cal Poly	W 53–46	1–0	Daniel-Meyer Coliseum (4,494); Fort Worth, TX
11/12/2012*; 5:00 pm, FSSW		Centenary	W 75–47	2–0	Daniel-Meyer Coliseum (3,759); Fort Worth, TX
11/15/2012*; 7:00 pm, FSSW		SMU	L 61–64	2–1	Daniel-Meyer Coliseum (4,145); Fort Worth, TX
11/18/2012*; 3:00 pm, FSSW		Prairie View A&M; South Padre Island Invitational	W 44–39	3–1	Daniel-Meyer Coliseum (3,839); Fort Worth, TX
11/20/2012*; 6:00 pm, FSSW		Navy; South Padre Island Invitational	W 47–45	4–1	Daniel-Meyer Coliseum (3,829); Fort Worth, TX
11/23/2012*; 7:30 pm		vs. Northwestern; South Padre Island Invitational Semifinals	L 31–55	4–2	South Padre Island Convention Centre (N/A); South Padre Island, TX
11/24/2012*; 4:00 pm, CBSSN		vs. UAB; South Padre Island Invitational 3rd Place Game	W 76–73	5–2	South Padre Island Convention Centre (N/A); South Padre Island, TX
11/29/2012*; 7:00 pm, FSSW		Southern Utah	W 61–52	6–2	Daniel-Meyer Coliseum (3,867); Fort Worth, TX
12/04/2012*; 8:00 pm, FSSW		Houston	L 48–54	6–3	Daniel-Meyer Coliseum (3,837); Fort Worth, TX
12/09/2012*; 12:00 pm, FSSW		at Tulsa	L 49–50	6–4	Reynolds Center (4,856); Tulsa, OK
12/18/2012*; 8:00 pm, FSSW+		Southern	W 68–57	7–4	Daniel-Meyer Coliseum (3,896); Fort Worth, TX
12/22/2012*; 7:00 pm		at Rice	W 65–63	8–4	Tudor Fieldhouse (1,549); Houston, TX
12/30/2012*; 3:00 pm, FSSW		Mississippi Valley State	W 67–64	9–4	Daniel-Meyer Coliseum (3,868); Fort Worth, TX
01/05/2013; 5:00 pm, FSSW		Texas Tech	L 53–62	9–5 (0–1)	Daniel-Meyer Coliseum (5,448); Fort Worth, TX
01/09/2013; 7:00 pm, B12N		at Oklahoma State	L 45–63	9–6 (0–2)	Gallagher-Iba Arena (7,502); Stillwater, OK
01/12/2013; 5:00 pm, FSSW		at Baylor	L 40–51	9–7 (0–3)	Ferrell Center (7,753); Waco, TX
01/16/2013; 8:00 pm, ESPNU		No. 16 Kansas State	L 54–67	9–8 (0–4)	Daniel-Meyer Coliseum (4,872); Fort Worth, TX
01/19/2013; 12:30 pm, B12N		Iowa State	L 50–63	9–9 (0–5)	Daniel-Meyer Coliseum (4,753); Fort Worth, TX
01/23/2013; 6:30 pm, ESPN2		at West Virginia	L 50–71	9–10 (0–6)	WVU Coliseum (7,094); Morgantown, WV
01/26/2013; 3:00 pm, B12N		Baylor	L 56–82	9–11 (0–7)	Daniel-Meyer Coliseum (6,277); Fort Worth, TX
02/02/2013; 7:00 pm, LHN		at Texas	L 43–60	9–12 (0–8)	Frank Erwin Center (11,641); Austin, TX
02/06/2013; 8:00 pm, ESPNU		No. 5 Kansas	W 62–55	10–12 (1–8)	Daniel-Meyer Coliseum (7,412); Fort Worth, TX
02/09/2013; 3:00 pm, B12N		West Virginia	L 50–63	10–13 (1–9)	Daniel-Meyer Coliseum (5,192); Fort Worth, TX
02/11/2013; 6:00 pm, ESPNU		at Oklahoma	L 48–75	10–14 (1–10)	Lloyd Noble Center (8,948); Norman, OK
02/16/2013; 12:45 pm, B12N		at Iowa State	L 53–87	10–15 (1–11)	Hilton Coliseum (14,376); Ames, IA
02/19/2013; 7:00 pm, B12N		Texas	L 59–68	10–16 (1–12)	Daniel-Meyer Coliseum (5,451); Fort Worth, TX
02/23/2013; 3:00 pm, B12N		at No. 9 Kansas	L 48–74	10–17 (1–13)	Allen Fieldhouse (16,300); Lawrence, KS
02/27/2013; 6:00 pm, ESPNU		No. 15 Oklahoma State	L 47–64	10–18 (1–14)	Daniel-Meyer Coliseum (7,046); Fort Worth, TX
03/02/2013; 3:00 pm, B12N		at Texas Tech	L 63–72	10–19 (1–15)	United Spirit Arena (9,372); Lubbock, TX
03/05/2013; 7:00 pm, B12N		at No. 9 Kansas State	L 68–79	10–20 (1–16)	Bramlage Coliseum (12,528); Manhattan, KS
03/09/2013; 4:00 pm, FSSW		Oklahoma	W 70–67	11–20 (2–16)	Daniel-Meyer Coliseum (5,392); Fort Worth, TX
2013 Big 12 men's basketball tournament
03/13/2013; 8:43 pm, B12N		vs. Texas; First Round	L 57–70	11–21	Sprint Center (17,018); Kansas City, MO
*Non-conference game. ^{#}Rankings from AP Poll / Coaches' Poll. (#) Tournament seedings in parentheses. All times are in Central Time.
