= 2012–13 Rice Owls men's basketball team =

American college basketball season

2012–13 Rice Owls men's basketball
- Conference: Conference USA
- Record: 5–26 (1–15 C-USA)
- Head coach: Ben Braun (5th season)
- Assistant coaches: Louis Reynaud; Gus Argenal; Adam Cohen
- Home arena: Tudor Fieldhouse

2012–13 Conference USA men's basketball standings
	Conf.				Overall
Team	W		L	PCT	W		L	PCT
No. 19 Memphis †	16	–	0	1.000	31	–	5	.861
Southern Miss	12	–	4	.750	27	–	10	.730
UTEP	10	–	6	.625	18	–	14	.563
East Carolina	9	–	7	.563	23	–	12	.657
UCF*	9	–	7	.563	20	–	11	.645
Tulsa	8	–	8	.500	17	–	16	.515
Houston	7	–	9	.438	20	–	13	.606
UAB	7	–	9	.438	16	–	17	.485
Tulane	6	–	10	.375	20	–	15	.571
Marshall	6	–	10	.375	13	–	19	.406
SMU	5	–	11	.313	15	–	17	.469
Rice	1	–	15	.063	5	–	26	.161
† 2013 C-USA tournament winner As of April 2, 2013; Rankings from AP poll *Ineligible for postseason play due to NCAA sanctions

The 2012–13 Rice Owls men's basketball team represented Rice University during the 2012–13 NCAA Division I men's basketball season. The Owls, led by fifth-year head coach Ben Braun, played their home games at the Tudor Fieldhouse and were members of Conference USA (C-USA). They finished the season 5–26, 1–15 in C-USA play, to finish in last place. They lost in the first round of the Conference USA tournament to Houston.

== Roster ==
Number	Name	Position	Height	Weight	Year	Hometown
1	Max Guercy	Guard	5' 9"	170	Freshman	Arleta, CA
3	Tamir Jackson	Guard	6' 3"	194	Senior	Paterson, NJ
4	Nizar Kapic	Guard/forward	6' 6"	195	Freshman	Sankt Pölten, Austria
5	Keith Washington	Guard	6' 1"	170	Freshman	Philadelphia, PA
10	Dan Peera	Guard	6' 0"	185	Sophomore	Concord, CA
11	Ross Wilson	Forward	6' 7"	205	Freshman	Gosforth, England
15	Julian DeBose	Guard	6' 4"	196	Sophomore	Washington, D.C.
41	Seth Gearhart	Forward	6' 7"	208	Sohpomore	Wilsonville, OR
42	Austin Ramljak	Guard	6' 3"	170	Junior	Thousand Oaks, CA
44	Bahrom Firozgary	Forward	6' 8"	200	Junior	Houston, TX

== Schedule ==
Date time, TV	Opponent	Result	Record	Site (attendance) city, state
Regular season
11/10/2012*; 7:00 pm	St. Thomas	L 59–72	0–1	Tudor Fieldhouse (1,637); Houston, TX
11/14/2012*; 7:00 pm	St. Edward's	W 75–63	1–1	Tudor Fieldhouse (1,288); Houston, TX
11/17/2012*; 7:00 pm	at Temple	L 63–77	1–2	Liacouras Center (6,836); Philadelphia, PA
11/22/2012*; 8:00 pm, ESPNU	vs. Georgia Tech; DIRECTV Classic quarterfinals	L 36–54	1–3	Anaheim Convention Center (1,087); Anaheim, CA
11/23/2012*; 8:30 pm, ESPNU	vs. Drake; DIRECTV Classic consolation round	L 66–77	1–4	Anaheim Convention Center (1,627); Anaheim, CA
11/25/2012*; 3:00 pm, ESPN3	vs. Drexel; DIRECTV Classic seventh-place game	L 47–55	1–5	Anaheim Convention Center (2,527); Anaheim, CA
12/01/2012*; 7:00 pm	Houston Baptist	W 61–53	2–5	Tudor Fieldhouse (1,827); Houston, TX
12/12/2012*; 7:00 pm	Long Island	L 70–97	2–6	Tudor Fieldhouse (1,172); Houston, TX
12/15/2012*; 7:00 pm	Hartford	L 51–58	2–7	Tudor Fieldhouse (1,632); Houston, TX
12/19/2012*; 7:00 pm	Chicago State	W 63–60 ^{OT}	3–7	Tudor Fieldhouse (1,077); Houston, TX
12/22/2012*; 7:00 pm	TCU	L 63–65	3–8	Tudor Fieldhouse (1,549); Houston, TX
12/29/2012*; 1:00 pm, LHN	at Texas	L 41–57	3–9	Frank Erwin Center (10,943); Austin, TX
01/05/2013*; 3:00 pm	at Harvard	L 62–92	3–10	Lavietes Pavilion (1,722); Boston, MA
01/09/2013; 7:00 pm	Southern Miss	L 52–75	3–11 (0–1)	Tudor Fieldhouse (1,411); Houston, TX
01/12/2013; 5:30 pm, CSS	at Tulsa	L 51–64	3–12 (0–2)	Reynolds Center (4,521); Tulsa, OK
01/16/2013; 6:00 pm, CSS	Memphis	L 51–77	3–13 (0–3)	Tudor Fieldhouse (1,837); Houston, TX
01/19/2013*; 7:00 pm	New Orleans	W 95–71	4–13	Tudor Fieldhouse (1,423); Houston, TX
01/23/2013; 6:00 pm, CSS	at UCF	L 67–78	4–14 (0–4)	UCF Arena (4,556); Orlando, FL
01/26/2013; 1:00 pm, CSS	at Tulane	L 66–73	4–15 (0–5)	Avron B. Fogelman Arena (1,698); New Orleans, LA
01/30/2013; 7:00 pm	Houston	W 79–69	5–15 (1–5)	Tudor Fieldhouse (2,532); Houston, TX
02/02/2013; 7:00 pm	East Carolina	L 63–79	5–16 (1–6)	Tudor Fieldhouse (1,691); Houston, TX
02/06/2013; 8:00 pm	at UTEP	L 53–65	5–17 (1–7)	Don Haskins Center (7,223); El Paso, TX
02/09/2013; 7:00 pm	SMU	L 39–61	5–18 (1–8)	Tudor Fieldhouse (2,256); Houston, TX
02/13/2013; 6:00 pm	at Marshall	L 70–71	5–19 (1–9)	Cam Henderson Center (5,308); Huntington, WV
02/16/2013; 7:00 pm	at UAB	L 57–80	5–20 (1–10)	Bartow Arena (5,176); Birmingham, AL
02/23/2013; 7:00 pm	Tulane	L 64–89	5–21 (1–11)	Tudor Fieldhouse (2,477); Houston, TX
02/27/2013; 7:00 pm	at SMU	L 55–67	5–22 (1–12)	Moody Coliseum (3,280); Dallas, TX
03/02/2013; 1:00 pm	UTEP	L 56–67	5–23 (1–13)	Tudor Fieldhouse (2,037); Houston, TX
03/06/2013; 7:00 pm	at Houston	L 62–84	5–24 (1–14)	Hofheinz Pavilion (3,923); Houston, TX
03/09/2013; 7:00 pm	Tulsa	L 71–77	5–25 (1–15)	Tudor Fieldhouse (2,018); Houston, TX
2013 Conference USA men's basketball tournament
03/13/2013; 6:00 pm	vs. Houston; First round	L 67–72	5–26	BOK Center (5,743); Tulsa, OK
*Non-conference game. ^{#}Rankings from AP poll. (#) Tournament seedings in parentheses. All times are in Central Time.
