= South Padre Island Invitational =

The South Padre Island Invitational was an annual NCAA Men's Basketball early season tournament. The tournament would feature a field of eight teams. The preliminary rounds were held at campus sites, with the third and final rounds held at the South Padre Island Convention Centre. The tournament was usually held over Thanksgiving weekend.

== Brackets ==
* – Denotes overtime period

=== 2012 ===
Semifinals
November 23 (CBSSN)
UAB	65
Illinois State	77
November 23 (CBSSN)
Northwestern	55
TCU	31

Final
November 24 (CBSSN)
Illinois State	69
Northwestern	72
Third place
November 23 (CBSSN)
UAB	73
TCU	76

Semifinals
November 23
Delaware State	62
Fairleigh Dickinson	63
November 23
Prairie View A&M	42
Navy	40

Final
November 24
Fairleigh Dickinson	84
Prairie View A&M	70
Third place
November 23
Delaware State	53
Navy	63

=== 2011 ===
Third Round; November 25
Iowa State	64
Providence	54

Third Round; November 25
Northern Iowa	64
Rice	60

Championship Round; November 26
Iowa State	90
Rice	63

Championship Round; November 26
Northern Iowa	79
Providence	62

Semifinals; November 25
Florida A&M	61
Southern	64
Northern Colorado	74
Western Carolina	57

Championship Game; November 26
Southern	57
Northern Colorado	77
3rd Place Game
Florida A&M	48
Western Carolina	62

=== 2010 ===
Semifinals; November 26; FCS Central
BYU	77
South Florida	75
Texas Tech	68
Saint Mary's	88

Championship Game; November 27; FCS
BYU	74
Saint Mary's	73
3rd Place Game
South Florida	64
Texas Tech	61

Semifinals; November 26
Georgia Southern	59
Chicago State	64
Liberty	64
Mississippi Valley State	58

Championship Game; November 27
Chicago State	65
Liberty	67
3rd Place Game
Georgia Southern	64
Mississippi Valley State	75

=== 2009 ===
Semifinals; November 27
Missouri	66
Old Dominion	61
Mississippi State	62
Richmond	63

Championship Game; November 28
Missouri	52
Richmond	59
3rd Place Game
Old Dominion	55
Mississippi State	69

Semifinals; November 27
Chattanooga	60
Texas–Pan American	51
Bethune–Cookman	66
Longwood	62

Championship Game; November 28
Texas–Pan American	64
Bethune–Cookman	67
3rd Place Game
Chattanooga	74
Longwood	70

=== 2008 ===
- November 28–29: South Padre Island Convention Centre

Semifinals; November 28; Fox College Sports
Illinois	69
Kent State	63
Texas A&M	56
Tulsa	67

Championship Game; November 29; Fox College Sports
Illinois	48
Tulsa	44
3rd Place Game
Kent State	71
Texas A&M	77

Losers Bracket; November 28
Texas A&M–Corpus Christi	73
Jackson State	63
UNC Wilmington	79
North Carolina Central	64

Championship Game; November 29
Texas A&M–Corpus Christi	97
UNC Wilmington	64
3rd Place Game
Jackson State	69
North Carolina Central	49

=== 2007 ===
==== Preliminary round ====
Preliminary round games played at on-campus sites

November 10
Vanderbilt	81
Austin Peay	67

November 10
Valparaiso	90
Grace	59

November 18
Bradley	98
Maryland Eastern Shore	71

November 18
Iowa	62
Florida Gulf Coast	49

November 20
Iowa	65
Maryland Eastern Shore	48

November 20
Utah State	90
Austin Peay	59

November 20
Vanderbilt	87
Valparaiso	78

November 20
Bradley	82
Florida Gulf Coast	74

===== Championship Round =====
- November 23–24: South Padre Island Convention Centre

Semifinals; November 23
Iowa	56
Bradley	67
Vanderbilt	77
Utah State	56

Championship Game; November 24
Bradley	86
Vanderbilt	95
3rd Place Game
Iowa	62
Utah State	75

Semifinals; November 23
Austin Peay	67
Florida Gulf Coast	57
Valparaiso	66
Maryland Eastern Shore	55

Championship Game; November 24
Austin Peay	47
Valparaiso	61
3rd Place Game
Florida Gulf Coast	71
Maryland Eastern Shore	58

=== 2006 ===
Semifinals; November 24
Auburn	65
Oklahoma State	66
Missouri State	66
Wisconsin	64

Championship Game; November 25
Oklahoma State	73*
Missouri State	70
3rd Place Game
Auburn	63
Wisconsin	77

Semifinals; November 24
Sam Houston State	72
East Tennessee State	61
Delaware State	65
Southern	63

Championship Game; November 25
Sam Houston State	62
Delaware State	55
3rd Place Game; November 25
Southern	52
East Tennessee State	66

=== 2005 ===
First Round; November 18
Illinois	77
Rutgers	57
