= 2012–13 East Carolina Pirates men's basketball team =

American college basketball season

2012–13 East Carolina Pirates men's basketball

CollegeInsider.com tournament champions

CIT Championship Game vs Weber State, W 77–74
- Conference: Conference USA
- Record: 23–12 (9–7 C-USA)
- Head coach: Jeff Lebo (3rd season)
- Assistant coaches: Tim Craft; Michael Perry; Ken Potosnak
- Home arena: Williams Arena

2012–13 Conference USA men's basketball standings
	Conf.				Overall
Team	W		L	PCT	W		L	PCT
No. 19 Memphis †	16	–	0	1.000	31	–	5	.861
Southern Miss	12	–	4	.750	27	–	10	.730
UTEP	10	–	6	.625	18	–	14	.563
East Carolina	9	–	7	.563	23	–	12	.657
UCF*	9	–	7	.563	20	–	11	.645
Tulsa	8	–	8	.500	17	–	16	.515
Houston	7	–	9	.438	20	–	13	.606
UAB	7	–	9	.438	16	–	17	.485
Tulane	6	–	10	.375	20	–	15	.571
Marshall	6	–	10	.375	13	–	19	.406
SMU	5	–	11	.313	15	–	17	.469
Rice	1	–	15	.063	5	–	26	.161
† 2013 C-USA tournament winner As of April 2, 2013; Rankings from AP poll *Ineligible for postseason play due to NCAA sanctions

The 2012–13 East Carolina Pirates men's basketball team represented East Carolina University during the 2012–13 NCAA Division I men's basketball season. The Pirates, led by third year head coach Jeff Lebo, played their home games at Williams Arena at Minges Coliseum and were members of Conference USA. They finished the season 23–12, 9–7 in C-USA play to finish in a tie for fourth place.

They lost in the quarterfinals of the Conference USA tournament to Tulsa. They were invited to the 2013 CIT where they defeated Savannah State, Rider, Loyola (MD), Evansville, and Weber State to be the 2013 CIT Champions.

== Roster ==
Number	Name	Position	Height	Weight	Year	Hometown
0	Miguel Paul	Guard	6–1	170	Senior	Winter Haven, Florida
1	Akeem Richmond	Guard	5–11	180	Junior	Sanford, North Carolina
2	Maurice Kemp	Forward	6–8	190	Senior	Miami, Florida
3	Petar Torlak	Guard	6–1	185	Junior	Belgrade, Serbia
4	Prince Williams	Guard	6–4	195	Freshman	Raleigh, North Carolina
5	Ty Armstrong	Forward	6–8	235	Junior	Melbourne, Florida
10	Francis Edosomwan	Guard	6–3	205	Sophomore	Charlotte, North Carolina
11	Corvonn Gaines	Guard	6–4	205	Senior	Madison, Wisconsin
12	Robert Sampson	Forward	6–8	210	Junior	Atlanta, Georgia
20	Shamarr Bowden	Guard	6–4	170	Senior	Greensboro, North Carolina
22	Paris Roberts-Campbell	Guard	6–2	180	Sophomore	Charlotte, North Carolina
23	Erin Staughn	Guard	6–6	215	Senior	Pensacola, Florida
34	Michael Zangari	Forward	6–9	230	Freshman	Lewisberry, Pennsylvania
41	Marshall Guilmette	Forward	6–10	240	Freshman	Kennesaw, Georgia
42	Yasin Kolo	Forward	6–10	250	Freshman	Göttingen, Germany

== Schedule ==
Date time, TV	Opponent	Result	Record	Site (attendance) city, state
Regular season
11/10/2012*; 5:00 pm	Washington & Lee	W 72–50	1–0	Williams Arena (4,759); Greenville, NC
11/13/2012*; 7:00 pm	Methodist	W 87–51	2–0	Williams Arena (3,830); Greenville, NC
11/16/2012*; 7:00 pm	UNC Greensboro	W 76–73	3–0	Williams Arena (4,946); Greenville, NC
11/20/2012*; 7:00 pm	Appalachian State	W 82–72	4–0	Williams Arena (4,014); Greenville, NC
11/26/2012*; 7:00 pm	at Georgia State	W 62–53	5–0	GSU Sports Arena (1,759); Atlanta, GA
12/01/2012*; 7:00 pm	at Charlotte	L 64–76	5–1	Dale F. Halton Arena (7,896); Charlotte, NC
12/04/2012*; 7:30 pm	St. Andrews	W 111–59	6–1	Williams Arena (4,021); Greenville, NC
12/15/2012*; 12:00 pm, ESPNU	at No. 21 North Carolina	L 87–93	6–2	Dean Smith Center (19,147); Chapel Hill, NC
12/18/2012*; 7:00 pm	Gardner–Webb	W 62–60	7–2	Williams Arena (3,961); Greenville, NC
12/22/2012*; 1:30 pm	at Massachusetts	L 81–88	7–3	Mullins Center (4,123); Amherst, MA
12/29/2012*; 5:30 pm	Norfolk State	W 74–63	8–3	Williams Arena (5,172); Greenville, NC
01/02/2013*; 7:00 pm	Campbell	L 81–86 ^{OT}	8–4	Williams Arena (3,770); Greenville, NC
01/05/2013*; 5:00 pm	North Carolina Wesleyan	W 91–60	9–4	Williams Arena (4,708); Greenville, NC
01/09/2013; 8:00 pm, FSSO/SPSO	at Memphis	L 54–67	9–5 (0–1)	FedExForum (15,341); Memphis, TN
01/12/2013; 7:00 pm	UCF	W 88–85 ^{OT}	10–5 (1–1)	Williams Arena (4,954); Greenville, NC
01/16/2013; 7:00 pm	Houston	W 89–78	11–5 (2–1)	Williams Arena (5,087); Greenville, NC
01/19/2013; 7:00 pm	at Marshall	L 56–77	11–6 (2–2)	Cam Henderson Center (6,056); Huntington, WV
01/23/2013; 8:00 pm	at UAB	W 91–85	12–6 (3–2)	Bartow Arena (3,233); Birmingham, AL
01/26/2013; 7:00 pm	UTEP	L 67–68	12–7 (3–3)	Williams Arena (6,121); Greenville, NC
01/30/2013; 7:00 pm	Memphis	L 68–75	12–8 (3–4)	Williams Arena (6,246); Greenville, NC
02/02/2013; 8:00 pm	at Rice	W 79–63	13–8 (4–4)	Tudor Fieldhouse (1,691); Houston, TX
02/09/2013; 4:00 pm	at UCF	L 73–83	13–9 (4–5)	UCF Arena (4,439); Orlando, FL
02/13/2013; 7:00 pm	UAB	W 74–61	14–9 (5–5)	Williams Arena (4,324); Greenville, NC
02/16/2013; 5:00 pm	Southern Miss	L 82–86 ^{OT}	14–10 (5–6)	Williams Arena (6,011); Greenville, NC
02/20/2013; 8:05 pm	at Tulsa	W 72–63	15–10 (6–6)	Reynolds Center (4,474); Tulsa, OK
02/23/2013; 3:00 pm, TWCTX	at SMU	W 72–69	16–10 (7–6)	Moody Coliseum (3,642); Dallas, TX
03/02/2013; 8:00 pm	at Southern Miss	L 69–88	16–11 (7–7)	Reed Green Coliseum (4,151); Hattiesburg, MS
03/06/2013; 7:00 pm	Tulane	W 88–85	17–11 (8–7)	Williams Arena (4,461); Greenville, NC
03/09/2013; 5:00 pm	Marshall	W 86–79	18–11 (9–7)	Williams Arena (5,377); Greenville, NC
2013 Conference USA men's basketball tournament
03/14/2013; 9:37 pm, CBSSN	vs. Tulsa; Quarterfinals	L 72–79	18–12	BOK Center (7,050); Tulsa, OK
2013 CIT
03/19/2013*; 7:00 pm	Savannah State; First Round	W 66–65	19–12	Williams Arena (2,053); Greenville, NC
03/23/2013*; 5:00 pm	Rider; Second Round	W 75–54	20–12	Williams Arena (3,886); Greenville, NC
03/26/2013*; 7:00 pm	Loyola (MD); Quarterfinals	W 70–58	21–12	Williams Arena (4,512); Greenville, NC
03/30/2013*; 5:00 pm	Evansville; Semifinals	W 81–58	22–12	Williams Arena (5,625); Greenville, NC
04/02/2013*; 8:00 pm, CBSSN	at Weber State; Championship Game	W 77–74	23–12	Dee Events Center (10,583); Ogden, Utah
*Non-conference game. ^{#}Rankings from AP Poll. (#) Tournament seedings in parentheses. All times are in Eastern Time.
