= 2013 Conference USA men's basketball tournament =

- Tournament logo
- Classification: Division I
- Season: 2012–13
- Teams: 11
- Site: BOK Center; Tulsa, Oklahoma
- Champions: Memphis Tigers (7th title)
- Winning coach: Josh Pastner (3rd title)
- MVP: Chris Crawford (Memphis Tigers)
- Television: CBS, CBS Sports Network

2012–13 Conference USA men's basketball standings
	Conf.				Overall
Team	W		L	PCT	W		L	PCT
No. 19 Memphis †	16	–	0	1.000	31	–	5	.861
Southern Miss	12	–	4	.750	27	–	10	.730
UTEP	10	–	6	.625	18	–	14	.563
East Carolina	9	–	7	.563	23	–	12	.657
UCF*	9	–	7	.563	20	–	11	.645
Tulsa	8	–	8	.500	17	–	16	.515
Houston	7	–	9	.438	20	–	13	.606
UAB	7	–	9	.438	16	–	17	.485
Tulane	6	–	10	.375	20	–	15	.571
Marshall	6	–	10	.375	13	–	19	.406
SMU	5	–	11	.313	15	–	17	.469
Rice	1	–	15	.063	5	–	26	.161
† 2013 C-USA tournament winner As of April 2, 2013; Rankings from AP poll *Ineligible for postseason play due to NCAA sanctions

The 2013 Conference USA men's basketball tournament was held at the BOK Center in Tulsa, Oklahoma from March 13–16, 2013. Memphis was slated to host the 2013 edition but the conference moved it to Tulsa in order to keep Memphis from having home-court advantage during their final appearance in the tournament.

The 2013 tournament was the last to feature participation from Memphis, Houston, and SMU, as the three schools joined the American Athletic Conference on July 1, 2013. The winner of the tournament will receive the conference's automatic bid to the 2013 NCAA tournament. UCF would also have been participating in the tournament for the last time, but was banned due to sanctions handed down by the NCAA in August 2012.

== Bracket ==
First round Wednesday, March 13
9	Marshall	64
8	Tulane	66
10	SMU	52
7	UAB	53
11	Rice	67
6	Houston	72

Quarterfinals; Thursday, March 14; CBSSN
8	Tulane	68
1	#20 Memphis	81
5	Tulsa	79
4	East Carolina	72
7	UAB	66
2	Southern Miss	81
6	Houston	69
3	UTEP	80

Semifinals; Friday, March 15; CBSSN
1	#20 Memphis	85
5	Tulsa	74
2	Southern Miss	85
3	UTEP	67

Championship; Saturday, March 16; CBS
1	#20 Memphis	91_{2OT}
2	Southern Miss	79

All times listed are Central
