= 2012–13 UCF Knights men's basketball team =

American college basketball season

2012–13 UCF Knights men's basketball

UCF Holiday Classic Champions
- Conference: Conference USA
- Record: 20–11 (9–7 C-USA)
- Head coach: Donnie Jones
- Assistant coaches: Shawn Finney; Darren Tillis; Tim Thomas
- Home arena: UCF Arena

2012–13 Conference USA men's basketball standings
	Conf.				Overall
Team	W		L	PCT	W		L	PCT
No. 19 Memphis †	16	–	0	1.000	31	–	5	.861
Southern Miss	12	–	4	.750	27	–	10	.730
UTEP	10	–	6	.625	18	–	14	.563
East Carolina	9	–	7	.563	23	–	12	.657
UCF*	9	–	7	.563	20	–	11	.645
Tulsa	8	–	8	.500	17	–	16	.515
Houston	7	–	9	.438	20	–	13	.606
UAB	7	–	9	.438	16	–	17	.485
Tulane	6	–	10	.375	20	–	15	.571
Marshall	6	–	10	.375	13	–	19	.406
SMU	5	–	11	.313	15	–	17	.469
Rice	1	–	15	.063	5	–	26	.161
† 2013 C-USA tournament winner As of April 2, 2013; Rankings from AP poll *Ineligible for postseason play due to NCAA sanctions

The 2012–13 UCF Knights men's basketball team represented the University of Central Florida during the 2012–13 college basketball season. The Knights competed in Division I of the National Collegiate Athletic Association (NCAA) and Conference USA (C-USA). The Knights, in the program's 44th season of basketball, were led by third-year head coach Donnie Jones, and played their home games at the UCF Arena on the university's main campus in Orlando, Florida.

Due to NCAA sanctions, UCF was ineligible for the 2013 Conference USA men's basketball tournament or a post-season berth. This was also the last season that UCF played in Conference USA before moving to the American Athletic Conference.

They finished the season 20–11, 9–7 in C-USA play to finish in a tie for fourth place.

== Previous season ==
In the previous year, the Knights finished the season 22–11, 10–6 in C-USA play. UCF was invited to the 2012 National Invitation Tournament, where they lost in the first round to Drexel.

== Pre-season ==
=== Departures ===
Name	Number	Pos.	Height	Weight	Year	Hometown	Notes
Wayne Martin	2	F	6'7"	200	Freshman	Jacksonville, Florida	Transferred
A. J. Rompza	3	G	5'9"	160	Senior	Chicago, Illinois	Graduated
Marcus Jordan	5	G	6'3"	205	Junior	Chicago, Illinois	Left the team
Dwight McCombs	10	F/C	6'8"	250	Senior	Chicago, Illinois	Suspended
C. J. Reed	12	G	6'3"	175	Senior	Daytona Beach, Florida	Transferred
Jeffrey Jordan	13	G	6'1"	175	RS senior	Chicago, Illinois	Left the team
P. J. Gaynor	21	F	6'8"	210	Senior	Jacksonville, Florida	Graduated
Josh Crittle	24	F	6'9"	260	RS junior	Bellwood, Illinois	Transferred

=== Class of 2012 signees ===
College recruiting
Name	Hometown	School	Height	Weight	Commit date
Staphon Blair; PF	Fort Lauderdale, FL	Dillard	6 ft 9 in (2.06 m)	240 lb (110 kg)	Nov 1, 2011
Staphon Blair; PF	Recruit ratings: Scout: Rivals: (89)				
Daiquan Walker; PG	Philadelphia, PA	Constitution	6 ft 1 in (1.85 m)	170 lb (77 kg)	Jun 15, 2012
Daiquan Walker; PG	Recruit ratings: Scout: Rivals: (88)				
Matt Williams; SG	Orlando, FL	Jones	6 ft 5 in (1.96 m)	195 lb (88 kg)	Jun 16, 2011
Matt Williams; SG	Recruit ratings: Scout: Rivals: (84)				
Dylan Karell; C	Miami, FL	Dr. Krop High School	6 ft 10 in (2.08 m)	210 lb (95 kg)	Sep 3, 2011
Dylan Karell; C	Recruit ratings: Scout: Rivals: (N/A)				
Overall recruit ranking:
Note: In many cases, Scout, Rivals, 247Sports, On3, and ESPN may conflict in their listings of height and weight.; In these cases, the average was taken. ESPN grades are on a 100-point scale.; Sources: "2012 Team Ranking". Rivals.

== Roster ==
2012–13 UCF Knights men's basketball team
Players
Coaches

Pos.	#	Name	Height	Weight	Year	Hometown
F	1	Tristan Spurlock	6 ft 8 in (2.03 m)	230 lb (104 kg)	RS Jr	Woodbridge, VA
G	2	Bobby Horodyski	6 ft 0 in (1.83 m)	180 lb (82 kg)	Sr	Gainesville, FL
G/F	3	Isaiah Sykes	6 ft 5 in (1.96 m)	215 lb (98 kg)	Jr	Detroit, MI
G	4	Daiquan Walker	6 ft 2 in (1.88 m)	180 lb (82 kg)	Fr	Philadelphia, PA
G/F	5	Rod Days	6 ft 6 in (1.98 m)	220 lb (100 kg)	So	Miami Gardens, FL
G	10	Tyler Coons	6 ft 2 in (1.88 m)	180 lb (82 kg)	Fr	Orlando, FL
G	11	Calvin Newell	6 ft 1 in (1.85 m)	210 lb (95 kg)	Jr	Philadelphia, PA
G	12	Matt Williams	6 ft 5 in (1.96 m)	210 lb (95 kg)	Fr	Orlando, FL
F	15	Dylan Karell	6 ft 11 in (2.11 m)	225 lb (102 kg)	Fr	North Miami Beach, FL
F	32	Kasey Wilson	6 ft 7 in (2.01 m)	225 lb (102 kg)	So	North Port, FL
F	33	Keith Clanton	6 ft 9 in (2.06 m)	250 lb (113 kg)	Sr	Orlando, FL
F	52	Staphon Blair	6 ft 9 in (2.06 m)	240 lb (109 kg)	Fr	Fort Lauderdale, FL

Head coach

- Donnie Jones (Pikeville)

Assistant coach(es)

- Shawn Finney (Fairmont)
- Darren Tillis (Paul Quinn)
- Tim Thomas (Wheeling Jesuit)

Legend

- (C) Team captain
- (S) Suspended
- (I) Ineligible
- (W) Walk-on
- Injured
- Current redshirt

Roster
Last update: October 14, 2012

== Schedule and results ==
Date time, TV	Opponent	Result	Record	Site (attendance) city, state
Regular season
11/10/2012*; 7:00 pm, BHSN	at South Florida; UCF–USF rivalry	W 74–56	1–0	USF Sun Dome (7,717); Tampa, FL
11/13/2012*; 7:00 pm	Alabama State; Global Sports Main Event	W 85–56	2–0	UCF Arena (4,454); Orlando, FL
11/18/2012*; 2:00 pm	Savannah State; Global Sports Main Event	W 53–50	3–0	UCF Arena (3,894); Orlando, FL
11/20/2012*; 7:00 pm	Middle Tennessee; Global Sports Main Event	L 61–75	3–1	UCF Arena (4,118); Orlando, FL
11/23/2012*; 4:00 pm, SunSp	at No. 7 Florida; Global Sports Main Event	L 66–79	3–2	O'Connell Center (10,195); Gainesville, FL
12/01/2012*; 4:00 pm	Florida Tech	W 90–62	4–2	UCF Arena (4,125); Orlando, FL
12/12/2012*; 7:00 pm	Bethune-Cookman	W 72–62	5–2	UCF Arena (3,822); Orlando, FL
12/14/2012*; 7:00 pm	at Old Dominion	W 75–71	6–2	Convocation Center (6,313); Norfolk, VA
12/18/2012*; 8:00 pm, CBSSN	Miami (FL)	L 50–72	6–3	UCF Arena (5,189); Orlando, FL
12/20/2012*; 7:00 pm, CSS	Stetson	W 83–66	7–3	UCF Arena (3,764); Orlando, FL
12/28/2012*; 7:00 pm	Howard; UCF Holiday Classic Semifinals	W 62–45	8–3	UCF Arena (4,401); Orlando, FL
12/29/2012*; 7:30 pm	Belmont; UCF Holiday Classic Championship	W 66–63	9–3	UCF Arena (4,278); Orlando, FL
01/02/2013*; 8:00 pm, CBSSN	South Florida; UCF–USF rivalry	L 56–65	9–4	UCF Arena (4,904); Orlando, FL
01/05/2013*; 4:00 pm	Florida A&M	W 99–69	10–4	UCF Arena (3,956); Orlando, FL
01/09/2013; 7:00 pm	UAB	W 64–48	11–4 (1–0)	UCF Arena (6,185); Orlando, FL
01/12/2013; 7:00 pm	at East Carolina	L 85–88 ^{OT}	11–5 (1–1)	Williams Arena (4,954); Greenville, NC
01/19/2013; 6:00 pm	at Houston	W 79–75 ^{OT}	12–5 (2–1)	Hofheinz Pavilion (3,577); Houston, TX
01/23/2013; 7:00 pm	Rice	W 78–67	13–5 (3–1)	UCF Arena (4,556); Orlando, FL
01/26/2013; 4:00 pm	SMU	W 74–65	14–5 (4–1)	UCF Arena (4,638); Orlando, FL
01/30/2013; 8:00 pm	at Tulane	W 58–50	15–5 (5–1)	Fogelman Arena (2,030); New Orleans, LA
02/02/2013; 2:00 pm, CSS	at Marshall	L 71–75	15–6 (5–2)	Cam Henderson Center (5,856); Huntington, WV
02/06/2013; 7:00 pm	Southern Miss	W 60–58	16–6 (6–2)	UCF Arena (4,648); Orlando, FL
02/09/2013; 4:00 pm	East Carolina	W 83–73	17–6 (7–2)	UCF Arena (4,439); Orlando, FL
02/13/2013; 8:00 pm, CBSSN	at No. 22 Memphis	L 71–93	17–7 (7–3)	FedEx Forum (16,544); Memphis, TN
02/16/2013; 9:00 pm	at UTEP	L 58–73	17–8 (7–4)	Don Haskins Center (8,926); El Paso, TX
02/20/2013; 7:00 pm	Marshall	L 70–82	17–9 (7–5)	UCF Arena (4,739); Orlando, FL
02/23/2013; 4:00 pm	Tulsa	W 83–75	18–9 (8–5)	UCF Arena (4,128); Orlando, FL
02/26/2013*; 7:00 pm	Georgia Southwestern	W 65–50	19–9	UCF Arena (3,781); Orlando, FL
03/02/2013; 1:00 pm, FSN	No. 19 Memphis	L 67–76	19–10 (8–6)	UCF Arena (6,447); Orlando, FL
03/06/2013; 7:00 pm, CSS	at UAB	W 74–70	20–10 (9–6)	Bartow Arena (3,759); Birmingham, AL
03/09/2013; 8:00 pm	at Southern Miss	L 62–70	20–11 (9–7)	Reed Green Coliseum (3,774); Hattiesburg, MS
*Non-conference game. ^{#}Rankings from AP Poll. (#) Tournament seedings in parentheses. All times are in Eastern Time.
