= 2012–13 Houston Cougars men's basketball team =

American college basketball season

2012–13 Houston Cougars men's basketball

CBI, Quarterfinals
- Conference: Conference USA
- Record: 20–13 (7–9 C-USA)
- Head coach: James Dickey (3rd season)
- Associate head coach: Alvin Brooks
- Assistant coaches: Daniyal Robinson; Ronnie Hamilton
- Home arena: Hofheinz Pavilion

2012–13 Conference USA men's basketball standings
	Conf.				Overall
Team	W		L	PCT	W		L	PCT
No. 19 Memphis †	16	–	0	1.000	31	–	5	.861
Southern Miss	12	–	4	.750	27	–	10	.730
UTEP	10	–	6	.625	18	–	14	.563
East Carolina	9	–	7	.563	23	–	12	.657
UCF*	9	–	7	.563	20	–	11	.645
Tulsa	8	–	8	.500	17	–	16	.515
Houston	7	–	9	.438	20	–	13	.606
UAB	7	–	9	.438	16	–	17	.485
Tulane	6	–	10	.375	20	–	15	.571
Marshall	6	–	10	.375	13	–	19	.406
SMU	5	–	11	.313	15	–	17	.469
Rice	1	–	15	.063	5	–	26	.161
† 2013 C-USA tournament winner As of April 2, 2013; Rankings from AP poll *Ineligible for postseason play due to NCAA sanctions

The 2012–13 Houston Cougars men's basketball team represented the University of Houston during the 2012–13 NCAA Division I men's basketball season. The Cougars, led by third year head coach James Dickey, played their home games at Hofheinz Pavilion and participated as a member of Conference USA. The season marked the last for the Cougars as a member of C-USA as they joined the American Athletic Conference in July 2013.

The Cougars ended the regular season with a 3-game winning streak and a 7–9 conference record. This placed the team as the number six seed in the C-USA tournament and a matchup with cross-town rival Rice in the first round. The Cougars won the game 72–67 and advanced to the quarterfinals to face UTEP where they lost 80–69.

After the UTEP loss, UH officials looked into options for the team to play in either the CBI or CIT postseason tournaments to give the young team more experience. The Cougars were later invited to participate in the 2013 College Basketball Invitational and paired up with Texas in the first round. Houston defeated the Longhorns and advanced to the quarterfinals where they lost to George Mason in overtime.

A highlight of the 2012–13 schedule was that it featured matchups with five former Southwest Conference rivals (Rice, SMU, TCU, Texas, and Texas A&M).

== Roster ==
Number	Name	Position	Height	Weight	Year	Hometown
0	Joe Young	Guard	6–3	185	Sophomore	Houston, Texas
1	Mikhail McLean	Forward	6–8	205	Sophomore	Houston, Texas
2	Brandon Morris	Guard	6–0	185	Junior	Alexandria, Louisiana
3	J. J. Thompson	Guard	6–0	185	Sophomore	Irving, Texas
4	LeRon Barnes	Guard	6–6	195	Freshman	Stonewall, Louisiana
12	Jimmie Jones	Guard	5–10	160	Junior	Plano, Texas
14	Tione Womack	Guard	6–1	170	Junior	Baltimore, Maryland
15	Leon Gibson	Forward	6–9	245	Senior	Los Angeles, California
20	Donald Brooks	Guard	6–0	185	Junior	Houston, Texas
21	Jherrod Stiggers	Guard	6–5	210	Freshman	Terrell, Texas
23	Danuel House	Forward	6–7	195	Freshman	Sugar Land, Texas
35	TaShawn Thomas	Forward	6–8	215	Sophomore	Killeen, Texas
45	Valentine Izundu	Center	6–10	215	Freshman	Houston, Texas
55	J.J. Richardson	Forward	6–8	245	Junior	Missouri City, Texas

== Schedule ==
Date time, TV	Opponent	Result	Record	Site (attendance) city, state
Exhibition
11/06/2012*; 7:00 pm	Concordia (TX)	W 108–55	0–0	Hofheinz Pavilion (2,714); Houston, TX
Non-conference regular season
11/09/2012*; 12:00 pm	Florida A&M	W 81–76	1–0	Hofheinz Pavilion (6,108); Houston, TX
11/13/2012*; 9:00 pm	at San Jose State	W 77–75	2–0	Event Center Arena (1,133); San Jose, CA
11/17/2012*; 7:00 pm	Grambling State	W 87–47	3–0	Hofheinz Pavilion (3,178); Houston, TX
11/19/2012*; 7:00 pm	Louisiana College	W 106–59	4–0	Hofheinz Pavilion (2,801); Houston, TX
11/25/2012*; 2:00 pm, CSNH	at Texas A&M–Corpus Christi	W 77–75	5–0	American Bank Center (1,194); Corpus Christi, TX
11/28/2012*; 7:00 pm	at Prairie View A&M	L 80–81	5–1	William Nicks Building (4,900); Prairie View, TX
12/01/2012*; 5:30 pm, FSN	Texas A&M	L 59–70	5–2	Hofheinz Pavilion (6,423); Houston, TX
12/04/2012*; 8:00 pm, FSSW	at TCU	W 54–48	6–2	Daniel–Meyer Coliseum (3,837); Fort Worth, TX
12/08/2012*; 5:00 pm	Texas Southern	W 78–75 ^{OT}	7–2	Hofheinz Pavilion (3,513); Houston, TX
12/15/2012*; 7:00 pm	Louisiana–Lafayette	W 85–63	8–2	Hofheinz Pavilion (3,268); Houston, TX
12/22/2012*; 3:00 pm	Chicago State	W 79–57	9–2	Hofheinz Pavilion (3,113); Houston, TX
12/29/2012*; 3:00 pm	Prairie View A&M	W 80–75	10–2	Hofheinz Pavilion (3,437); Houston, TX
01/03/2013*; 7:00 pm	Texas–Pan American	W 96–71	11–2	Hofheinz Pavilion (3,113); Houston, TX
Conference USA Regular Season
01/09/2013; 7:00 pm	SMU	W 78–67	12–2 (1–0)	Hofheinz Pavilion (3,123); Houston, TX
01/12/2013; 2:00 pm	at Southern Miss	L 54–73	12–3 (1–1)	Reed Green Coliseum (4,198); Hattiesburg, MS
01/16/2013; 6:00 pm	at East Carolina	L 78–89	12–4 (1–2)	Williams Arena (5,087); Greenville, NC
01/19/2013; 5:00 pm	UCF	L 75–79 ^{OT}	12–5 (1–3)	Hofheinz Pavilion (3,577); Houston, TX
01/23/2013; 7:00 pm	Tulsa	L 72–87	12–6 (1–4)	Hofheinz Pavilion (3,197); Houston, TX
01/26/2013; 5:00 pm	UAB	W 66–61	13–6 (2–4)	Hofheinz Pavilion (3,135); Houston, TX
01/30/2013; 7:00 pm	at Rice	L 69–79	13–7 (2–5)	Tudor Fieldhouse (2,532); Houston, TX
02/02/2013; 2:00 pm, TWC Texas	at SMU	W 84–80 ^{OT}	14–7 (3–5)	Moody Coliseum (3,886); Dallas, TX
02/09/2013; 1:00 pm, CSS/CSNH	Tulane	L 85–88	14–8 (3–6)	Hofheinz Pavilion (3,307); Houston, TX
02/13/2013; 7:00 pm	UTEP	W 79–61	15–8 (4–6)	Hofheinz Pavilion (3,159); Houston, TX
02/16/2013; 3:30 pm, FSN	at Tulsa	L 92–101 ^{3OT}	15–9 (4–7)	Reynolds Center (4,949); Tulsa, OK
02/20/2013; 8:00 pm, CSS/CSNH	at No. 21 Memphis	L 74–81	15–10 (4–8)	FedExForum (16,791); Memphis, TN
02/27/2013; 8:00 pm	at UTEP	L 53–63	15–11 (4–9)	Don Haskins Center (7,835); El Paso, TX
03/02/2013; 1:00 pm, CSS/CSNH	Marshall	W 103–76	16–11 (5–9)	Hofheinz Pavilion (3,935); Houston, TX
03/06/2013; 7:00 pm	Rice	W 84–62	17–11 (6–9)	Hofheinz Pavilion (3,923); Houston, TX
03/09/2013; 7:00 pm	at Tulane	W 96–94	18–11 (7–9)	Devlin Fieldhouse (1,670); New Orleans, LA
2013 Conference USA men's basketball tournament
03/13/2013; 6:00 pm	vs. Rice; First Round	W 72–67	19–11	BOK Center (5,743); Tulsa, OK
03/14/2013; 2:40 pm, CBSSN	vs. UTEP; Quarterfinals	L 69–80	19–12	BOK Center (5,976); Tulsa, OK
2013 College Basketball Invitational
03/20/2013*; 8:00 pm, AXS TV	Texas; First Round	W 73–72	20–12	Hofheinz Pavilion (4,407); Houston, TX
03/25/2013*; 6:00 pm, AXS TV	at George Mason; Quarterfinals	L 84–88 ^{OT}	20–13	Patriot Center (2,044); Fairfax, VA
*Non-conference game. ^{#}Rankings from AP Poll. (#) Tournament seedings in parentheses. All times are in Central Time.
