= 2012–13 Tulsa Golden Hurricane men's basketball team =

American college basketball season

2012–13 Tulsa Golden Hurricane men's basketball

CBI, First Round
- Conference: Conference USA
- Record: 17–16 (8–8 C-USA)
- Head coach: Danny Manning (1st season)
- Assistant coaches: Brett Ballard; Wendell Moore; Steve Woodberry
- Home arena: Reynolds Center

2012–13 Conference USA men's basketball standings
	Conf.				Overall
Team	W		L	PCT	W		L	PCT
No. 19 Memphis †	16	–	0	1.000	31	–	5	.861
Southern Miss	12	–	4	.750	27	–	10	.730
UTEP	10	–	6	.625	18	–	14	.563
East Carolina	9	–	7	.563	23	–	12	.657
UCF*	9	–	7	.563	20	–	11	.645
Tulsa	8	–	8	.500	17	–	16	.515
Houston	7	–	9	.438	20	–	13	.606
UAB	7	–	9	.438	16	–	17	.485
Tulane	6	–	10	.375	20	–	15	.571
Marshall	6	–	10	.375	13	–	19	.406
SMU	5	–	11	.313	15	–	17	.469
Rice	1	–	15	.063	5	–	26	.161
† 2013 C-USA tournament winner As of April 2, 2013; Rankings from AP poll *Ineligible for postseason play due to NCAA sanctions

The 2012–13 Tulsa Golden Hurricane men's basketball team represented the University of Tulsa during the 2012–13 NCAA Division I men's basketball season. The Golden Hurricane, led by first year head coach Danny Manning, played their home games at the Reynolds Center and were members of Conference USA. They finished the season 17–16, 8–8 in C-USA play to finish in sixth place. They advanced to the semifinals of the C-USA tournament where they lost to Memphis. They were invited to the 2013 College Basketball Invitational where they lost in the first round to Wright State.

== Roster ==
Number	Name	Position	Height	Weight	Year	Hometown
0	Kauri Black	Forward	6–7	220	Senior	Rialto, California
1	Rashad Smith	Forward	6–7	195	Sohpomore	Plano, Texas
2	Pat Swilling, Jr.	Guard	6–2	210	Junior	New Orleans, Louisiana
3	Rashad Ray	Guard	5–11	175	Freshman	New Orleans, Louisiana
4	Jamie Booker	Guard	6–2	200	Senior	Tulsa, Oklahoma
5	Tim Peete	Guard	6–4	200	Junior	Memphis, Tennessee
10	James Woodard	Guard	6–4	175	Freshman	Edmond, Oklahoma
11	Shaquille Harrison	Guard	6–3	175	Freshman	Kansas City, Missouri
15	Zeldric King	Forward	6–7	240	Freshman	Dallas, Texas
22	Nick Wood	Guard	6–1	155	Freshman	Tulsa, Oklahoma
34	Scottie Haralson	Guard	6–4	236	Senior	Jackson, Mississippi
40	D'Andre Wright	Forward	6–8	220	Freshman	Lawton, Oklahoma
44	Brandon Swannegan	Forward	6–7	187	Freshman	Houston, Texas

== Schedule ==
Date time, TV	Opponent	Result	Record	Site (attendance) city, state
Exhibition
October 27, 2012*; 3:00 pm	Emporia State	W 60–49		Reynolds Center (N/A); Tulsa, OK
November 4, 2012*; 4:30 pm	Oklahoma Panhandle State	W 113–70		Reynolds Center (N/A); Tulsa, OK
Regular season
November 11, 2012*; 7:00 pm	LSU–Shreveport	W 110–54	1–0	Reynolds Center ( 5,689); Tulsa, OK
November 15, 2012*; 6:30 pm	vs. Northern Kentucky; NUCDF Basketball Tournament	W 76–56	2–0	Jenny Craig Pavilion (N/A); San Diego, CA
November 16, 2012*; 9:00 pm	at San Diego; NUCDF Basketball Tournament	W 63–51	3–0	Jenny Craig Pavilion (1,442); San Diego, CA
November 17, 2012*; 7:00 pm	vs. Cal State Northridge; NUCDF Basketball Tournament	L 76–92	3–1	Jenny Craig Pavilion (N/A); San Diego, CA
November 21, 2012*; 7:00 pm	Jackson State	W 86–66	4–1	Reynolds Center (4,134); Tulsa, OK
November 24, 2012*; 2:00 pm	Stephen F. Austin	L 41–57	4–2	Reynolds Center (3,984); Tulsa, OK
November 28, 2012*; 7:00 pm	at Wichita State	L 60–86	4–3	Charles Koch Arena (10,389); Wichita, KS
December 5, 2012*; 7:00 pm	Missouri State	W 61–42	5–3	Reynolds Center (4,105); Tulsa, OK
December 8, 2012*; 2:00 pm, FSN	TCU	W 50–49	6–3	Reynolds Center (4,856); Tulsa, OK
December 15, 2012*; 2:00 pm	at Arkansas–Little Rock	L 65–72	6–4	Jack Stephens Center (N/A); Little Rock, AR
December 19, 2012*; 7:05 pm, ESPN3	at No. 17 Creighton	L 54–71	6–5	CenturyLink Center Omaha (15,102); Omaha, NE
December 22, 2012*; 2:00 pm, KGEB/FCS	at Oral Roberts	W 72–68	7–5	Mabee Center (6,020); Tulsa, OK
December 29, 2012*; 1:00 pm, FSN	vs. Florida State; Orange Bowl Basketball Classic	L 63–82	7–6	BB&T Center (12,779); Sunrise, FL
January 2, 2013*; 7:05 pm	Buffalo	W 63–57	8–6	Reynolds Center (3,894); Tulsa, OK
January 6, 2013; 7:00 pm, FSN	at SMU	W 48–47	9–6 (1–0)	Moody Coliseum (3,590); Dallas, TX
January 9, 2013; 6:00 pm	at Marshall	L 61–79	9–7 (1–1)	Cam Henderson Center (5,115); Huntington, WV
January 12, 2013; 5:30 pm	Rice	W 64–51	10–7 (2–1)	Reynolds Center (4,521); Tulsa, OK
January 16, 2013; 7:05 pm	UTEP	W 45–42	11–7 (3–1)	Reynolds Center (4,333); Tulsa, OK
January 19, 2013; 1:00 pm	at Tulane	L 72–75	11–8 (3–2)	Avron B. Fogelman Arena (2,147); New Orleans, LA
January 23, 2013; 7:00 pm	at Houston	W 87–72	12–8 (4–2)	Hofheinz Pavilion (3,197); Houston, TX
January 26, 2013; 3:05 pm	Southern Miss	L 59–62	12–9 (4–3)	Reynolds Center (5,230); Tulsa, OK
February 2, 2013; 1:00 pm, CBSSN	at Memphis	L 64–94	12–10 (4–4)	FedExForum (16,196); Memphis, TN
February 6, 2013; 7:05 pm	UAB	L 63–70	12–11 (4–5)	Reynolds Center (4,147); Tulsa, OK
February 9, 2013; 8:00 pm	at UTEP	W 74–70	13–11 (5–5)	Don Haskins Center (9,811); El Paso, TX
February 16, 2013; 3:30 pm, FSN	Houston	W 101–92 ^{3OT}	14–11 (6–5)	Reynolds Center (4,949); Tulsa, OK
February 20, 2013; 7:05 pm	East Carolina	L 63–72	14–12 (6–6)	Reynolds Center (4,474); Tulsa, OK
February 23, 2013; 3:00 pm	at UCF	L 75–83	14–13 (6–7)	UCF Arena (4,128); Orlando, FL
March 2, 2013; 3:05 pm	Tulane	W 78–66	15–13 (7–7)	Reynolds Center (5,089); Tulsa, OK
March 6, 2013; 7:00 pm	SMU	L 65–71	15–14 (7–8)	Reynolds Center (4,710); Tulsa, OK
March 9, 2013; 7:00 pm	at Rice	W 77–71	16–14 (8–8)	Tudor Fieldhouse (2,018); Houston, TX
2013 Conference USA men's basketball tournament
March 14, 2013; 8:37 pm, CBSSN	vs. East Carolina; Quarterfinals	W 79–72	17–14	BOK Center (7,050); Tulsa, OK
March 15, 2013; 5:45 pm, CBSSN	vs. No. 20 Memphis; Semifinals	L 74–85	17–15	BOK Center (8,006); Tulsa, OK
2013 College Basketball Invitational
March 20, 2013*; 6:00 pm	at Wright State; First Round	L 52–72	17–16	Nutter Center (2,507); Fairborn, OH
*Non-conference game. ^{#}Rankings from AP Poll. (#) Tournament seedings in parentheses. All times are in Central Time.
