= Connor Lammert =

American basketball player

Personal information
- Born: August 31, 1994 (age 32) Tampa, Florida
- Listed height: 6 ft 9 in (2.06 m)
- Listed weight: 240 lb (109 kg)

Career information
- High school: Winston Churchill (San Antonio, Texas)
- College: Texas (2012–2016)
- NBA draft: 2016: undrafted
- Playing career: 2016–2019
- Position: Power forward

Career history
- 2016–2017: Hiroshima Dragonflies
- 2017–2018: Nishinomiya Storks
- 2018–2019: Cyberdyne Ibaraki Robots

Connor Austin Lammert (born August 31, 1994) is an American former professional basketball player for Cyberdyne Ibaraki Robots in Japan.
