= 2012–13 NCAA Division I men's basketball rankings =

- Season: 2012–13
- NCAA Tournament: 2013
- Preseason No. 1: Indiana
- NCAA Tournament Champions: Louisville
NCAA Division I men's basketball rankings


Two human polls make up the 2012–13 NCAA Division I men's basketball rankings, the AP Poll and the Coaches Poll, in addition to various publications' preseason polls.

== Legend ==
	Increase in ranking
	Decrease in ranking
	Not ranked previous week
(Italics)	Number of first place votes
(#-#)	Win–loss record
т	Tied with team above or below also with this symbol

== AP poll ==
This poll is compiled by sportswriters across the nation. In Division I men's and women's college basketball, the AP Poll is largely just a tool to compare schools throughout the season and spark debate, as it has no bearing on postseason play.

	Preseason Oct. 26	Week 2 Nov. 12	Week 3 Nov. 19	Week 4 Nov. 26	Week 5 Dec. 3	Week 6 Dec. 10	Week 7 Dec. 17	Week 8 Dec. 24	Week 9 Dec. 31	Week 10 Jan. 7	Week 11 Jan. 14	Week 12 Jan. 21	Week 13 Jan. 28	Week 14 Feb. 4	Week 15 Feb. 11	Week 16 Feb. 18	Week 17 Feb. 25	Week 18 Mar. 4	Week 19 Mar. 11	Week 20 Mar. 18	
1.	Indiana 43	Indiana (1–0) 46	Indiana (3–0) 46	Indiana (6–0) 47	Indiana (8–0) 45	Indiana (9–0) 44	Duke (9–0) 62	Duke (11–0) 63	Duke (12–0) 63	Duke (14–0) 62	Louisville (16–1) 36	Duke (16–1) 39	Michigan (19–1) 51	Indiana (20–2) 58	Indiana (22–3) 26	Indiana (23–3) 43	Indiana (24–3) 64	Gonzaga (29–2) 51	Gonzaga (30–2) 54	Gonzaga (31–2) 45	1.
2.	Louisville 20	Louisville (1–0) 18	Louisville (3–0) 19	Duke (6–0) 18	Duke (8–0) 20	Duke (9–0) 20	Michigan (11–0) 3	Michigan (12–0) 2	Michigan (13–0) 2	Michigan (15–0) 3	Indiana (15–2) 13	Michigan (17–1) 11	Kansas (18–1) 13	Florida (18–2) 7	Duke (22–2) 20	Miami (FL) (21–3) 20	Gonzaga (27–2) 1	Indiana (25–4) 7	Duke (27–4) 11	Louisville (29–5) 20	2.
3.	Kentucky 2	Kentucky (1–0) 1	Ohio State (3–0)	Michigan (5–0)	Michigan (7–0)	Michigan (9–0)	Syracuse (9–0)	Arizona (12–0)	Arizona (12–0)	Louisville (13–1)	Duke (15–1) 14	Syracuse (17–1) 8	Indiana (18–2)	Michigan (20–2)	Miami (FL) (20–3) 17	Gonzaga (25–2) 2	Duke (24–3)	Duke (25–4) 5	Indiana (26–5)	Kansas (29–5)	3.
4.	Ohio State	Ohio State (1–0)	Michigan (3–0)	Ohio State (4–0)	Syracuse (5–0)	Syracuse (8–0)	Arizona (8–0)	Louisville (11–1)	Louisville (12–1)	Arizona (14–0)	Kansas (15–1) 1	Kansas (16–1) 7	Florida (16–2) 1	Duke (19–2)	Michigan (21–4)	Michigan State (22–4)	Michigan (23–4)	Kansas (25–4)	Louisville (26–5)	Indiana (27–6)	4.
5.	Michigan	Michigan (1–0)	Duke (3–0)	Louisville (5–1)	Louisville (6–1)	Florida (7–0)	Louisville (9–1)	Indiana (11–1)	Indiana (12–1)	Indiana (13–1)	Michigan (16–1) 1	Louisville (16–2)	Duke (17–2)	Kansas (19–2)	Gonzaga (24–2) 2	Florida (21–3)	Miami (FL) (22–4)	Georgetown (23–4) 2	Georgetown (24–5)	Miami (FL) (27–6)	5.
6.	NC State	NC State (1–0)	Syracuse (2–0)	Syracuse (4–0)	Florida (6–0)	Louisville (8–1)	Indiana (9–1)	Kansas (10–1)	Kansas (11–1)	Kansas (12–1)	Syracuse (16–1)	Arizona (16–1)	Syracuse (18–2)	Gonzaga (21–2)	Syracuse (20–4)	Duke (22–3)	Kansas (23–4)	Miami (FL) (23–5)	Michigan (25–6)	Duke (27–5)	6.
7.	Kansas	Kansas (1–0)	Florida (3–0)	Florida (5–0)	Ohio State (5–1)	Ohio State (6–1)	Ohio State (8–1)	Missouri (10–1)	Syracuse (11–1)	Syracuse (14–1)	Arizona (15–1)	Indiana (16–2)	Gonzaga (19–2)	Arizona (19–2)	Florida (20–3)	Michigan (22–4)	Georgetown (21–4)	Michigan (24–5)	Kansas (26–5)	Ohio State (26–7)	7.
8.	Duke	Syracuse (1–0)	Kentucky (2–1)	Kentucky (4–1)	Arizona (5–0)	Arizona (7–0)	Florida (7–1)	Cincinnati (12–0)	Ohio State (10–2)	Minnesota (14–1)	Gonzaga (16–1)	Florida (14–2)	Arizona (17–2)	Miami (FL) (17–3)	Michigan State (21–4)	Syracuse (21–4)	Florida (22–4)	Louisville (24–5)	Michigan State (24–7)	Georgetown (25–6)	8.
9.	Syracuse	Duke (1–0)	North Carolina (3–0)	Arizona (3–0)	Kansas (6–1)	Kansas (7–1)	Kansas (8–1)	Syracuse (10–1)	Minnesota (12–1)	Gonzaga (15–1)	Minnesota (15–2)	Butler (16–2)	Butler (17–3)	Syracuse (18–3)	Arizona (20–4)	Kansas (21–4)	Michigan State (22–6)	Kansas St (24–5)	Miami (FL) (24–6)	Michigan State (25–8)	9.
10.	Florida	Florida (1–0)	Arizona (2–0)	Kansas (4–1)	Gonzaga (8–0)	Illinois (10–0)	Illinois (12–0)	Ohio State (9–2)	Gonzaga (12–1)	Missouri (11–2)	Florida (12–2)	Gonzaga (17–2)	Oregon (18–2)	Ohio State (17–4)	Kansas State (19–5)	Louisville (21–5)	Louisville (22–5)	Michigan St (22–7)	Ohio St (23–7)	Michigan (26–7) т	10.
11.	North Carolina	North Carolina (2–0)	UCLA (3–0)	Creighton (6–0)	Cincinnati (6–1)	Cincinnati (9–0)	Cincinnati (10–0)	Minnesota (12–1)	Illinois (13–1)	Florida (10–2)	Ohio State (13–3)	Kansas State (15–2)	Ohio State (15–4)	Louisville (18–4)	Butler (20–5)	Georgetown (19–4)	Arizona (23–4)	Florida (23–5)	Kansas St (25–6)	New Mexico (29–5) т	11.
12.	Arizona	Arizona (1–0)	Kansas (2–1)	Gonzaga (6–0)	Missouri (6–1)	Missouri (8–1)	Missouri (8–1)	Illinois (12–1)	Missouri (10–2)	Illinois (14–2)	Creighton (17–1)	Minnesota (15–3)	Louisville (16–4)	Michigan State (18–4)	Louisville (20–5)	Arizona (21–4)	Syracuse (22–5)	New Mexico (25–4)	Marquette (23–7)	Kansas State (27–7)	12.
13.	UCLA	UCLA (1–0)	Missouri (3–0)	Michigan State (5–1)	Illinois (8–0)	Minnesota (10–1)	Minnesota (11–1)	Gonzaga (11–1)	Florida (9–2)	Creighton (14–1)	Butler (15–2)	Michigan State (16–3)	Michigan State (17–4)	Kansas State (17–4)	Ohio State (20–6)	Kansas State (21–5)	Kansas St (22–5)	Oklahoma St (22–6)	Florida (24–6)	Saint Louis (27–6)	13.
14.	Michigan State	Missouri (1–0)	Creighton (3–0)	North Carolina (5–1)	Minnesota (8–1)	Gonzaga (9–1)	Gonzaga (10–1)	Florida (8–2)	Cincinnati (12–1)	Butler (12–2)	NC State (14–3)	Ohio State (13–4)	Miami (FL) (15–3)	Butler (18–4)	Kansas (20–4)	Oklahoma State (19–5)	New Mexico (23–4)	Ohio St (21–7)	Oklahoma State (23–7)	Florida (26–7)	14.
15.	Missouri	Creighton (1–0)	Michigan State (2–1)	Oklahoma State (5–0)	Georgetown (5–1)	Georgetown (7–1)	Georgetown (9–1)	Georgetown (10–1)	Georgetown (10–1)	Ohio State (11–3)	San Diego State (14–2)	New Mexico (16–2)	Wichita State (19–2)	New Mexico (19–3)	Georgetown (19–4)	Butler (21–5)	Oklahoma St (20–6)	Marquette (21–7)	New Mexico (26–5)	Marquette (23–8)	15.
16.	Creighton	Baylor (2–0)	NC State (3–1)	Missouri (5–1)	Creighton (7–1)	Creighton (9–1)	New Mexico (11–0)	Creighton (11–1)	Creighton (12–1)	San Diego State (12–2)	Kansas State (14–2)	Oregon (16–2)	Ole Miss (17–2)	Creighton (20–3)	Pittsburgh (20–5)	New Mexico (22–4)	Ohio St (20–7)	Saint Louis (23–5)	Saint Louis (24–6)	Syracuse (26–9)	16.
17.	Memphis	Memphis (0–0)	Gonzaga (3–0)	Cincinnati (6–0)	San Diego State (5–1)	New Mexico (10–0)	Creighton (10–1)	San Diego State (11–2)	Butler (10–2)	Notre Dame (13–1)	Missouri (13–3)	Creighton (17–2)	Missouri (15–4)	Cincinnati (18–4)	Oklahoma State (18–5)	Marquette (18–6)	Wisconsin (19–8)	Syracuse (22–7)	Pittsburgh (24–7)	Oklahoma State (24–8)	17.
18.	UNLV	UNLV (0–0)	UNLV (2–0)	NC State (4–1)	New Mexico (8–0)	San Diego State (7–1)	San Diego State (8–1)	Butler (9–2)	Michigan State (11–2)	Kansas State (12–2)	Michigan State (15–3)	NC State (15–3)	Kansas State (15–4)	Minnesota (17–5)	Marquette (17–6)	Ohio State (18–7)	Saint Louis (21–5)	Arizona (23–6)	Arizona (24–6)	Wisconsin (23–11)	18.
19.	Baylor	Gonzaga (1–0)	Memphis (2–0)	Colorado (5–0)	Michigan State (6–2)	Michigan State (8–2)	Butler (8–2)	Michigan State (11–2)	San Diego State (11–2)	Georgetown (10–2)	New Mexico (15–2)	VCU (16–3)	NC State (16–4)	Oregon (18–4)	New Mexico (21–4)	Wisconsin (18–8)	Memphis (24–3)	Oregon (23–6)	Syracuse (23–8)	Memphis (30–4)	19.
20.	San Diego State	Notre Dame (1–0)	Oklahoma State (4–0)	Georgetown (4–1)	North Carolina (6–2)	UNLV (7–1)	Michigan State (9–2)	UNLV (11–1)	New Mexico (13–1)	NC State (12–2)	Notre Dame (14–3)	Wichita State (17–2)	New Mexico (17–3)	Georgetown (16–4)	Wisconsin (17–8)	Pittsburgh (20–7)	Butler (22–6)	Pittsburgh (23–7)	Memphis (27–4)	Pittsburgh (24–8)	20.
21.	Gonzaga	Michigan State (0–1)	Connecticut (4–0)	Minnesota (6–1)	UNLV (5–1)	North Carolina (7–2)	UNLV (8–1)	Notre Dame (12–1)	Notre Dame (13–1)	Cincinnati (13–2)	Oregon (14–2)	Cincinnati (16–3)	Creighton (18–3)	Missouri (16–5)	Notre Dame (20–6)	Memphis (22–3)	Notre Dame (22–6)	VCU (23–6)	UCLA (23–8)	Arizona (25–7)	21.
22.	Notre Dame	Wisconsin (1–0)	Cincinnati (3–0)	Illinois (7–0)	Notre Dame (7–1)	Notre Dame (8–1)	Notre Dame (9–1)	Oklahoma State (10–1)	Oklahoma State (10–1)	Michigan State (12–3)	VCU (14–3)	Missouri (13–4)	San Diego State (16–4)	Oklahoma State (15–5)	Memphis (21–3)	Colorado State (21–4)	Marquette (19–7)	Wisconsin (20–9)	Wisconsin (21–10)	Creighton (27–7)	22.
23.	Wisconsin	Connecticut (1–0)	Colorado (4–0)	San Diego State (4–1)	Oklahoma State	Wichita State (9–0)	North Carolina (8–2)	NC State (9–2)	NC State (10–2)	Wichita State (14–1)	Illinois (14–4)	Ole Miss (15–2)	Minnesota (15–5)	Pittsburgh (18–5)	Oregon (20–5)	Oregon (21–5)	Pittsburgh (21–7)	UCLA (22–7)	Creighton (27–7)	Notre Dame (25–9)	23.
24.	Cincinnati	Cincinnati (1–0)	Baylor (4–1)	UNLV (3–1)	Wichita State (8–0)	Oklahoma State (7–1)	Oklahoma State (8–1)	Pittsburgh (12–1)	Pittsburgh (12–1)	UNLV (13–2)	UCLA (14–3)	Notre Dame (15–3)	Cincinnati (16–4)	Marquette (15–5)	Colorado State (20–4)	VCU (21–5)	Oregon (22–6)	Notre Dame (22–7)	Notre Dame (23–8)	UCLA (25–9)	24.
25.	Florida State	San Diego State (0–1)	San Diego State (2–1)	New Mexico (6–0)	NC State (4–2)	NC State (6–2)	NC State (7–2)	Kansas State (9–2)	Kansas State (10–2)	New Mexico (13–2)	Marquette (12–3)	Miami (FL) (13–3)	Marquette (14–4)	Notre Dame (18–4)	Kentucky (17–6)	Notre Dame (21–6)	Louisiana Tech (24–3)	Memphis (25–4)	VCU (24–7)	Oregon (26–8)	25.
	Preseason Oct. 26	Week 2 Nov. 12	Week 3 Nov. 19	Week 4 Nov. 26	Week 5 Dec. 3	Week 6 Dec. 10	Week 7 Dec. 17	Week 8 Dec. 24	Week 9 Dec. 31	Week 10 Jan. 7	Week 11 Jan. 14	Week 12 Jan. 21	Week 13 Jan. 28	Week 14 Feb. 4	Week 15 Feb. 11	Week 16 Feb. 18	Week 17 Feb. 25	Week 18 Mar. 4	Week 19 Mar. 11	Week 20 Mar. 18	
		Dropped: Florida State (1–0)	Dropped: Notre Dame (3–1), Wisconsin (2–1)	Dropped: UCLA (4–2), Memphis (3–2), Connecticut (5–1), Baylor (4–2)	Dropped: Kentucky (4–3), Colorado (6–1)	None	Dropped: Wichita State (9–1)	Dropped: New Mexico (12–1); North Carolina (9–3)	Dropped: UNLV (11–2)	Dropped: Oklahoma State (10–3); Pittsburgh(12–3)	Dropped: Georgetown (11–3); Cincinnati (14–3); Wichita St (15–2); UNLV (14–3)	Dropped: San Diego State (14–4); Illinois (15–5); UCLA (15–4); Marquette (13–4)	Dropped: VCU (16–5); Notre Dame (16–4)	Dropped: Wichita State (19–4); Ole Miss (17–4); NC State (16–6); San Diego State (17–5)	Dropped: Creighton (20–5); Cincinnati (18–6); Minnesota (17–7); Missouri (17–6)	Dropped: Kentucky (17–8)	Dropped: Colorado State (21–6); VCU (22–6)	Dropped: Butler (22–7); Louisiana Tech (26–3)	Dropped: Oregon (23–8)	Dropped: VCU (26–8)	

== USA Today Coaches Poll ==
The Coaches Poll is the second oldest poll still in use after the AP Poll. It is compiled by a rotating group of 31 college Division I head coaches. The Poll operates by Borda count. Each voting member ranks teams from 1 to 25. Each team then receives points for their ranking in reverse order: Number 1 earns 25 points, number 2 earns 24 points, and so forth. The points are then combined and the team with the highest points is then ranked #1; second highest is ranked #2 and so forth. Only the top 25 teams with points are ranked, with teams receiving first place votes noted the quantity next to their name. The maximum points a single team can earn is 775.

	Preseason Oct. 17	Week 2 Nov. 12	Week 3 Nov. 19	Week 4 Nov. 26	Week 5 Dec. 3	Week 6 Dec 10	Week 7 Dec 17	Week 8 Dec 24	Week 9 Dec 31	Week 10 Jan 7	Week 11 Jan 14	Week 12 Jan 21	Week 13 Jan 28	Week 14 Feb 4	Week 15 Feb 11	Week 16 Feb 18	Week 17 Feb 25	Week 18 Mar 4	Week 19 Mar 11	Week 20 Mar 18	Final Apr 8	
1.	Indiana 21	Indiana (1–0) 25	Indiana (3–0) 26	Indiana (6–0) 27	Indiana (8–0) 25	Indiana (9–0) 25	Duke (9–0) 30	Duke (11–0) 30	Duke (12–0) 30	Duke (14–0) 30	Louisville (15–1) 18	Duke (16–1) 20	Kansas (18–1) 16	Indiana (20–2) 25	Duke (21–2) 18	Indiana (23–3) 19	Indiana (24–3) 28	Gonzaga (29–2) 29	Gonzaga (30–2) 29	Gonzaga (31–2) 30	Louisville (35–5) 31	1.
2.	Louisville 5	Louisville (1–0) 4	Louisville (3–0) 5	Duke (6–0) 4	Duke (8–0) 6	Duke (9–0) 6	Michigan (11–0) 1	Michigan (12–0) 1	Michigan (13–0) 1	Michigan (15–0) 1	Indiana (15–1) 6	Kansas (16–1) 8	Michigan (19–1) 14	Florida (18–2) 6	Indiana (21–3) 6	Miami (FL) (21–3) 7	Gonzaga (27–2) 3	Indiana (25–4)	Duke (27–4) 2	Louisville (29–5) 1	Michigan (31–8)	2.
3.	Kentucky 5	Kentucky (1–0) 2	Ohio State (3–0)	Michigan (5–0)	Michigan (7–0)	Michigan (9–0)	Syracuse (9–0)	Arizona (11–0) т	Arizona (12–0)	Arizona (14–0)	Duke (15–1) 7	Michigan (17–1) 1	Indiana (18–2)	Michigan (20–2)	Gonzaga (23–2) 1	Gonzaga (25–2) 3	Duke (24–3)	Kansas (25–4) 1	Indiana (26–5)	Kansas (29–5)	Syracuse (30–10)	3.
4.	Ohio State	Ohio State (1–0)	Michigan (3–0)	Ohio State (4–0)	Syracuse (5–0)	Syracuse (8–0)	Louisville (9–1)	Louisville (11–1) т	Louisville (12–1)	Louisville (13–1)	Kansas (14–1)	Syracuse (17–1) 2	Florida (16–2) 1	Duke (19–2)	Miami (FL) (19–3) 5	Florida (21–3) 2	Michigan (23–4)	Duke (25–4)	Louisville (26–5)	Indiana (27–6) т	Wichita State (30–9)	4.
5.	Michigan	Michigan (1–0)	Duke (3–0)	Syracuse (4–0)	Florida (6–0)	Florida (7–0)	Arizona (8–0)	Indiana (11–1)	Indiana (12–1)	Indiana (13–1)	Michigan (16–1)	Louisville (16–2)	Duke (17–2)	Kansas (19–2)	Michigan (21–3) 1	Michigan State (22–4)	Kansas (23–4)	Georgetown (23–4)	Georgetown (24–5)	Miami (FL) (27–6) т	Duke (30–6)	5.
6.	NC State	NC State (1–0)	Syracuse (2–0)	Louisville (5–1)	Louisville (6–1)	Louisville (8–1)	Indiana (9–1)	Kansas (10–1)	Kansas (11–1)	Kansas (12–1)	Syracuse (16–1)	Arizona (16–1)	Syracuse (18–2)	Gonzaga (21–2)	Florida (19–3)	Duke (22–3)	Florida (22–4)	Louisville (24–5) 1	Kansas (26–5)	Ohio State (26–7)	Ohio State (29–8)	6.
7.	Kansas	Kansas (1–0)	Kentucky (2–1)	Florida (5–0)	Ohio State (5–1)	Ohio State (6–1)	Ohio State (8–1)	Syracuse (10–1)	Syracuse (11–1)	Syracuse (14–1)	Arizona (15–1)	Florida (14–2)	Gonzaga (19–2)	Arizona (19–2)	Syracuse (20–3)	Michigan (22–4)	Miami (FL) (22–4)	Miami (FL) (23–5)	Michigan State (24–7)	Duke (27–5)	Indiana (29–7)	7.
8.	Duke	Syracuse (1–0)	Florida (3–0)	Kentucky (4–1)	Arizona (5–0)	Arizona (7–0)	Kansas (8–1)	Cincinnati (12–0)	Ohio State (10–2)	Gonzaga (15–1)	Gonzaga (16–1)	Indiana (16–2)	Arizona (17–2)	Michigan State (18–4)	Michigan State (20–4)	Syracuse (21–4)	Georgetown (21–4)	Michigan (24–5)	Michigan (25-6)	Georgetown (25–6)	Kansas (31–6)	8.
9.	Syracuse	Duke (1–0)	North Carolina (3–0)	Arizona (3–0)	Kansas (6–1)	Kansas (7–1)	Florida (7–1)	Missouri (10–1)	Florida (9–2)	Florida (10–2)	Florida (12–2)	Butler (16–2)	Michigan State (17–4)	Syracuse (18–3)	Arizona (20–3)	Kansas (21–4)	Louisville (22–5)	Florida (23–5)	Ohio State (23–7)	Michigan State (25–8)	Florida (29–8)	9.
10.	Florida	Florida (1–0)	Arizona (2–0)	Kansas (4–1)	Gonzaga (8–0)	Illinois (10–0)	Illinois (12–0)	Ohio State (9–2)	Gonzaga (12–1)	Minnesota (14–1)	Creighton (16–1)	Gonzaga (17–2)	Butler (17–3)	Ohio State (17–4)	Butler (20–4)	Louisville (21–5)	Michigan State (22–6)	Kansas State (24–5)	Miami (FL) (24–6)	New Mexico (29–5)	Miami (FL) (29–7)	10.
11.	Arizona	North Carolina (2–0)	Kansas (2–1)	Creighton (6–0)	Missouri (6–1)	Missouri (8–1)	Cincinnati (1–0)	Florida (8–2)	Creighton (12–1)	Creighton (14–1)	Ohio State (13–3)	Michigan State (16–3)	Ohio State (15–4)	Miami (FL) (17–3)	Kansas State (19–4)	Georgetown (19–4)	Arizona (23–4)	New Mexico (25–4)	Florida (24–6)	Michigan (26–7)	Marquette (26–9)	11.
12.	North Carolina	Arizona (1–0)	Creighton (3–0)	Gonzaga (6–0)	Cincinnati (7–0)	Cincinnati (9–0)	Missouri (8–1)	Creighton (11–1)	Missouri (10–2)	Missouri (11–2)	Minnesota (15–2)	Creighton (17–2)	Oregon (18–2)	Louisville (18–4)	Louisville (19–5)	Arizona (21–4)	Syracuse (22–5)	Michigan State (22–7)	Kansas State (25–6)	Florida (26–7)	Gonzaga (32–3)	12.
13.	UCLA	Creighton (1–0)	UCLA (3–0)	North Carolina (5–1)	Creighton (7–1)	Creighton (9–1)	Creighton (10–1)	Gonzaga (11–1)	Minnesota (12–1)	Illinois (14–2)	Butler (14–2)	Kansas State (15–2)	Louisville (16–4)	Creighton (20–3)	Kansas (19–4)	Kansas State (20–5)	Kansas State (22–5)	Ohio State (21–7)	Marquette (23–7)	Saint Louis (27–6)	Michigan State (27–9)	13.
14.	Michigan State	UCLA (1–0)	Missouri (3–0)	Michigan State (5–1)	Illinois (8–0)	Gonzaga (9–1)	Gonzaga (10–1)	Minnesota (12–1)	Illinois (13–1)	Ohio State (11–3)	San Diego State (14–2)	Minnesota (15–3)	Wichita State (19–2)	Butler (18–4)	Ohio State (17–6)	Oklahoma State (19–5)	New Mexico (23–4)	Oklahoma State (22–6)	New Mexico (26–5)	Kansas State (27–7)	Arizona (27–8)	14.
15.	Creighton	Missouri (1–0)	NC State (3–1)	Missouri (5–1)	San Diego State (5–1)	San Diego State (7–1)	San Diego State (8–1)	Illinois (12–1)	Cincinnati (12–1)	San Diego State (12–2)	NC State (14–2)	Ohio State (13–4)	Miami (FL) (15–3)	Kansas State (17–4)	Georgetown (17–4)	Butler (21–5)	Ohio State (20–7)	Saint Louis (23–5)	Oklahoma State (23–7)	Memphis (30–4)	Oregon (28–9)	15.
16.	Memphis	Memphis (0–0)	Gonzaga (3–0)	Cincinnati (6–0)	North Carolina (6–2)	Minnesota (10–1)	Minnesota (11–1)	San Diego State (11–1)	Georgetown (10–1)	Notre Dame (13–1)	Missouri (12–3)	VCU (16–3)	Ole Miss (17–2)	New Mexico (19–3)	Oklahoma State (17–5)	New Mexico (22–4)	Wisconsin (19–8)	Syracuse (22–7)	Saint Louis (24–6)	Marquette (23–8)	Saint Louis (28–7)	16.
17.	Missouri	Baylor (2–0)	Memphis (2–0)	Oklahoma State (5–0)	Michigan State (6–2)	UNLV (7–1)	New Mexico (11–0)	UNLV (11–1)	San Diego State (11–2)	Butler (12–2)	Michigan State (14–3)	New Mexico (16–2)	Creighton (18–3)	Cincinnati (18–4)	Pittsburgh (20–5)	Wisconsin (18–8)	Memphis (24–3)	Marquette (21–7)	Memphis (27–4)	Wisconsin (23–11)	Georgetown (25–7)	17.
18.	Baylor	UNLV (0–0)	UNLV (2–0)	NC State (4–1)	UNLV (5–1)	North Carolina (7–2)	UNLV (8–1)	Georgetown (10–1)	Michigan State (11–2)	Michigan State (12–3)	Kansas State (13–2)	NC State (15–3)	Missouri (15–4)	Minnesota (17–5)	New Mexico (20–4)	Ohio State (18–7)	Oklahoma State (20–6)	Arizona (23–6)	Arizona (24–6)	Syracuse (26–9)	Memphis (31–5)	18.
19.	UNLV	Gonzaga (1–0)	Michigan State (2–1)	Colorado (5–0)	Kentucky (4–3)	Michigan State (8–2)	Michigan State (9–2) т	Michigan State (11–2)	Notre Dame (12–1)	UNLV (13–2)	VCU (14–3)	Oregon (16–2)	NC State (16–4)	Oregon (18–4)	Wisconsin (17–7)	Memphis (22–3)	Saint Louis (21–5)	VCU (23–6)	Pittsburgh (24–7)	Oklahoma State (24–8)	New Mexico (29–6)	19.
20.	San Diego State	Wisconsin (1–0)	Cincinnati (3–0)	UNLV (3–1)	New Mexico (8–0)	New Mexico (10–0)	North Carolina (8–2) т	Notre Dame (12–1)	Butler (10–2)	Cincinnati (13–2)	Notre Dame (14–2)	Cincinnati (16–3)	San Diego State (16–4)	Missouri (16–5)	Marquette (17–5)	Marquette (18–6)	Notre Dame (22–6)	Memphis (25–4)	Syracuse (23–8)	Arizona (25–7)	Kansas State (27–8)	20.
21.	Wisconsin	Notre Dame (1–0)	Baylor (4–1)	San Diego State (4–1)	Minnesota (8–1)	Georgetown (7–1)	Georgetown (9–1)	Butler (9–2)	Oklahoma State (10–1)	NC State (12–2)	New Mexico (15–2)	Wichita State (17–2)	Kansas State (15–4)	Georgetown (16–4)	Notre Dame (19–5)	Colorado State (21–4)	Butler (22–6)	Wisconsin (20–9)	Saint Mary's (27–5)	Creighton (27–7)	Creighton (28–8)	21.
22.	Gonzaga	Michigan State (0–1)	Oklahoma State (4–0)	Illinois (7–0)	Oklahoma State (5–1)	Kentucky (6–3)	Notre Dame (9–1)	Oklahoma State (10–1)	Pittsburgh (12–1)	Georgetown (10–2)	Illinois (14–4)	Missouri (13–4)	New Mexico (17–3)	Wichita State (19–4)	San Diego State (18–5)	Pittsburgh (20–6)	Marquette (19–7)	Pittsburgh (23–7)	VCU (24–7)	Pittsburgh (24–8)	Wisconsin (23–12)	22.
23.	Notre Dame	San Diego State (0–1)	Connecticut (4–0)	New Mexico (6–0)	Georgetown (5–1)	Oklahoma State (7–1)	Kentucky (7–3)	Kentucky (8–3)	New Mexico (13–1)	Kansas State (12–2)	UNLV (14–3)	Notre Dame (15–3)	Cincinnati (16–4)	Ole Miss (17–4)	Creighton (20–5)	Oregon (21–5)	Saint Mary's (24–5)	Saint Mary's (26–5)	Wisconsin (21–10)	VCU (26–8)	VCU (27–9)	23.
24.	Florida State т	Cincinnati (1–0)	Wisconsin (2–1)	UCLA (4–2)	NC State (4–2)	Notre Dame (8–1)	Oklahoma State (8–1)	Pittsburgh (12–1)	UNLV (11–2)	VCU (12–3)	Cincinnati (14–3)	Ole Miss (15–2)	Minnesota (15–5)	Oklahoma State (15–5)	Colorado State (19–4)	VCU (21–5)	Akron (22–4)	Notre Dame (22–7)	Creighton (27–7)	Oregon (26–8)	La Salle (24–10)	24.
25.	Texas т	Texas (1–0)	San Diego State (2–1)	Georgetown (4–1)	Notre Dame (7–1)	NC State (6–2)	Butler (8–2)	NC State (9–2)	NC State (10–2)	Wyoming (13–0)	UCLA (14–3)	San Diego State (14–4)	Marquette (14–4)	Pittsburgh (18–5) т; San Diego State (16–5) т	Memphis (20–3)	Notre Dame (20–6)	VCU (22–6)	Oregon (23–6)	UCLA (23–8)	Saint Mary's (27–6)	Florida Gulf Coast (26–11)	25.
	Preseason Oct. 17	Week 2 Nov. 12	Week 3 Nov. 19	Week 4 Nov. 26	Week 5 Dec. 3	Week 6 Dec 10	Week 7 Dec 17	Week 8 Dec 24	Week 9 Dec 31	Week 10 Jan 7	Week 11 Jan 14	Week 12 Jan 21	Week 13 Jan 28	Week 14 Feb 4	Week 15 Feb 11	Week 16 Feb 18	Week 17 Feb 25	Week 18 Mar 4	Week 19 Mar 11	Week 20 Mar 18	Final Apr 8	
		Dropped: Florida State (1–0)	Dropped: Notre Dame (3–1), Texas (2–1)	Dropped: Memphis (3–2), Baylor (4–2), Connecticut (5–1), Wisconsin (4–2)	Dropped: Colorado (6–1), UCLA (5–3)	None	Dropped: NC State (7–2)	Dropped: New Mexico (12–1); North Carolina (9–3)	Dropped: Kentucky (8–4)	Dropped: Oklahoma State (10–3); Pittsburgh (12–3); New Mexico (13–2)	Dropped: Georgetown (11–3); Wyoming (14–1)	Dropped: Illinois (14–5); UNLV (15–4); UCLA (15–4)	Dropped: VCU (16–5); Notre Dame (16–4)	Dropped: NC State (16–6); Marquette (15–5)	Dropped: Cincinnati (18–6); Minnesota (17–7); Oregon (19–5); Missouri (17–6); Wichita State (20–5); Ole Miss (18–5)	Dropped: San Diego State (18–7); Creighton (21–6)	Dropped: Colorado State (21–6); Pittsburgh (21–7); Oregon (22–6)	Dropped: Butler (22–7); Akron (23–5)	Dropped: Notre Dame (23–8); Oregon (23–8)	Dropped: UCLA (25–9)	Dropped: Pittsburgh (24–9); Saint Mary's (28–7)	

== Preseason polls ==
Various publications and news sources release their preseason top 25 months before the season commences.

	Sporting News	Blue Ribbon	ESPN	Sports Illustrated
1.	Indiana	Indiana	Indiana	Indiana
2.	Louisville	Louisville	Louisville	Louisville
3.	Ohio State	Kentucky	Kentucky	Kansas
4.	Kentucky	NC State	Michigan	Kentucky
5.	Michigan	Michigan	Kansas	NC State
6.	Duke	Duke	NC State	Michigan
7.	Syracuse	Michigan State	Ohio State	Ohio State
8.	Arizona	Florida	Syracuse	Duke
9.	NC State	North Carolina	Duke	Florida
10.	Missouri	Creighton	UCLA	UCLA
11.	UCLA	Saint Louis	Florida	Syracuse
12.	Kansas	UCLA	Michigan State	North Carolina
13.	North Carolina	Kansas	North Carolina	Michigan State
14.	Creighton	Syracuse	Arizona	Missouri
15.	Memphis	UNLV	Memphis	Arizona
16.	Florida	Arizona	Creighton	San Diego State
17.	Wisconsin	Ohio State	Missouri	Creighton
18.	Cincinnati	Memphis	Gonzaga	Memphis
19.	San Diego State	Baylor	UNLV	UNLV
20.	UNLV	Gonzaga	San Diego State	Notre Dame
21.	Gonzaga	Notre Dame	Baylor	Gonzaga
22.	Michigan State	Tennessee	Notre Dame	Wisconsin
23.	Murray State	Wisconsin	Wisconsin	VCU
24.	Notre Dame	Miami (FL)	Cincinnati	Baylor
25.	VCU	Texas	Saint Louis	Saint Louis
