= 2013 Missouri Valley Conference men's basketball tournament =

- Classification: Division I
- Season: 2012–13
- Teams: 10
- Site: Scottrade Center; St. Louis, Missouri
- Champions: Creighton (12th title)
- Winning coach: Greg McDermott (3rd title)
- MVP: Doug McDermott (Creighton)
- Television: MVC TV, CBS

2012–13 Missouri Valley Conference men's basketball standings
	Conf.				Overall
Team	W		L	PCT	W		L	PCT
No. 22 Creighton †	13	–	5	.722	28	–	8	.778
Wichita State	12	–	6	.667	30	–	9	.769
Northern Iowa	11	–	7	.611	21	–	15	.583
Evansville	10	–	8	.556	21	–	15	.583
Indiana State	9	–	9	.500	18	–	15	.545
Illinois State	8	–	10	.444	18	–	15	.545
Missouri State	7	–	11	.389	11	–	22	.333
Bradley	7	–	11	.389	18	–	17	.514
Drake	7	–	11	.389	15	–	17	.469
Southern Illinois	6	–	12	.333	14	–	17	.452
† 2013 MVC tournament winner As of April 6, 2013; Rankings from AP Poll

The 2013 Missouri Valley Conference men's basketball tournament, popularly referred to as "Arch Madness", as part of the 2012-13 NCAA Division I men's basketball season was played in St. Louis, Missouri March 7–10, 2013 at the Scottrade Center. The championship game was televised on CBS on Sunday March 10. The tournament's winner received the Missouri Valley Conference's automatic bid to the 2013 NCAA tournament.

== Tournament Bracket ==
Opening Round; Thursday, March 7 MVC TV
8	Bradley	66
9	Drake	81
7	Missouri State	61
10	Southern Illinois	53

Quarterfinals; Friday, March 8 MVC TV
1	Creighton	65
9	Drake	53
4	Evansville	50
5	Indiana State	51
2	Wichita State	69
7	Missouri State	59
3	Northern Iowa	65
6	Illinois State	73

Semifinals; Saturday, March 9 MVC TV
1	Creighton	64
5	Indiana State	43
2	Wichita State	66
6	Illinois State	51

Final; Sunday, March 10; CBS
1	Creighton	68
2	Wichita State	65
