= 2012–13 Southern Illinois Salukis men's basketball team =

American college basketball season

2012–13 Southern Illinois Salukis men's basketball
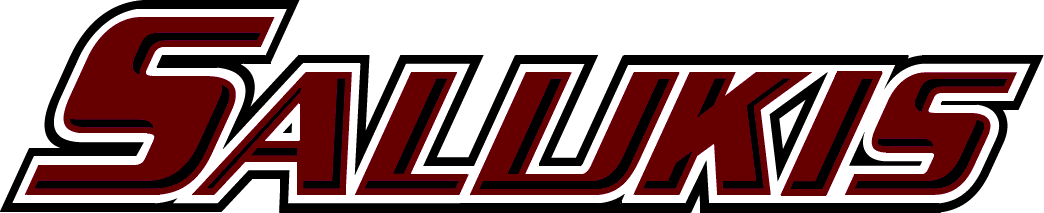
- Conference: Missouri Valley Conference
- Record: 14–17 (6–12 The Valley)
- Head coach: Barry Hinson (1st season)
- Assistant coaches: Tom Hankins; Anthony Beane, Sr.; Terrance McGee
- Home arena: SIU Arena

2012–13 Missouri Valley Conference men's basketball standings
	Conf.				Overall
Team	W		L	PCT	W		L	PCT
No. 22 Creighton †	13	–	5	.722	28	–	8	.778
Wichita State	12	–	6	.667	30	–	9	.769
Northern Iowa	11	–	7	.611	21	–	15	.583
Evansville	10	–	8	.556	21	–	15	.583
Indiana State	9	–	9	.500	18	–	15	.545
Illinois State	8	–	10	.444	18	–	15	.545
Missouri State	7	–	11	.389	11	–	22	.333
Bradley	7	–	11	.389	18	–	17	.514
Drake	7	–	11	.389	15	–	17	.469
Southern Illinois	6	–	12	.333	14	–	17	.452
† 2013 MVC tournament winner As of April 6, 2013; Rankings from AP Poll

The 2012–13 Southern Illinois Salukis men's basketball team represented Southern Illinois University Carbondale during the 2012–13 NCAA Division I men's basketball season. The Salukis, led by first year head coach Barry Hinson, played their home games at the SIU Arena and were members of the Missouri Valley Conference.

They finished the season 14–17, 6–12 in MVC play to finish in last place. They lost in the first round of the Missouri Valley tournament to Missouri State.

== Roster ==
Number	Name	Position	Height	Weight	Year	Hometown
1	Jalen Pendleton	Guard	6–2	201	Freshman	Evansville, Indiana
2	Kendal Brown-Surles	Guard	5–9	174	Senior	Evansville, Indiana
3	Desmar Jackson	Guard	6–5	173	Junior	Warren, Ohio
4	Davante Drinkard	Forward	6–9	234	Junior	Toccoa, Georgia
5	Antonio Bryer	Forward	6–6	218	Sophomore	Norfolk, Virginia
11	Colby Long	Guard	5–11	170	Junior	Mt. Zion, Illinois
12	T.J. Lindsay	Guard	6–3	169	Senior	Mansfield, Ohio
15	Dantiel Daniels	Forward	6–5	230	Sophomore	Wentzville, Missouri
21	Josh Swan	Guard	6–2	181	Sophomore	Atlanta, Georgia
22	Jeff Early	Guard	6–1	187	Senior	Glasgow, Virginia
23	Bola Olaniyan	Forward	6–7	219	Freshman	Lagos, Nigeria
24	Diamond Taylor	Guard	6–4	173	Junior	Chicago, Illinois
25	Anthony Beane, Jr.	Guard	6–2	171	Freshman	Normal, Illinois
44	Chase Heins	Forward	6–6	264	Freshman	Campbell Hill, Illinois

== Schedule ==
Date time, TV	Opponent	Result	Record	Site (attendance) city, state
Exhibition
10/27/2012*; 7:00 pm	Lincoln	W 83–47		SIU Arena (2,215); Carbondale, IL
11/03/2012*; 7:00 pm	Upper Iowa	W 73–62		SIU Arena (2,705); Carbondale, IL
Regular season
11/12/2012*; 7:00 pm	at New Orleans	W 72–55	1–0	Lakefront Arena (690); New Orleans, LA
11/17/2012*; 7:00 pm	Benedictine–Springfield	W 100–62	2–0	SIU Arena (3,107); Carbondale, IL
11/20/2012*; 7:00 pm	at SIU Edwardsville	W 71–55	3–0	Vadalabene Center (3,507); Edwardsville, IL
11/24/2012*; 7:00 pm	at Saint Louis	L 51–61	3–1	Chaifetz Arena (6,340); St. Louis, MO
11/28/2012*; 7:00 pm	Fresno State; MW–MVC Challenge	W 57–54	4–1	SIU Arena (5,409); Carbondale, IL
12/05/2012*; 7:00 pm, ESPN3	at WKU	L 57–58	4–2	E. A. Diddle Arena (3,833); Bowling Green, OH
12/15/2012*; 7:00 pm	at Green Bay	W 72–70	5–2	Resch Center (3,057); Green Bay, WI
12/17/2012*; 7:00 pm	New Orleans	W 74–61	6–2	SIU Arena (5,031); Carbondale, IL
12/20/2012*; 6:30 pm	vs. UC Davis; World Vision Classic	L 70–78	6–3	Smith Spectrum (331); Logan, UT
12/21/2012*; 6:30 pm	vs. Nicholls State; World Vision Classic	W 65–53	7–3	Smith Spectrum (785); Logan, UT
12/22/2012*; 9:05 pm	at Utah State; World Vision Classic	L 58–70	7–4	Smith Spectrum (7,919); Logan, UT
12/30/2012; 5:30 pm	at Missouri State	L 59–70	7–5 (0–1)	JQH Arena (7,662); Springfield, MO
01/02/2013; 7:05 pm	Bradley	L 60–66	7–6 (0–2)	SIU Arena (5,015); Carbondale, IL
01/05/2013; 8:00 pm, MVC–TV	at Evansville	L 68–85	7–7 (0–3)	Ford Center (6,032); Evansville, IN
01/09/2013; 7:00 pm, ESPN3	at No. 23 Wichita State	L 76–82	7–8 (0–4)	Charles Koch Arena (10,306); Wichita, KS
01/12/2013; 7:05 pm	Indiana State	W 76–71	8–8 (1–4)	SIU Arena (5,315); Carbondale, IL
01/15/2013; 7:00 pm	at Bradley	L 66–69	8–9 (1–5)	Carver Arena (6,628); Peoria, IL
01/20/2013; 7:00 pm, ESPNU	Illinois State	L 56–70	8–10 (1–6)	SIU Arena (5,254); Carbondale, IL
01/23/2013; 7:00 pm, ESPN3	at Northern Iowa	L 45–58	8–11 (1–7)	McLeod Center (3,656); Cedar Falls, IA
01/27/2013; 7:00 pm, ESPNU	No. 17 Creighton	L 51–81	8–12 (1–8)	SIU Arena (5,764); Carbondale, IL
01/30/2013; 7:05 pm	Drake	L 56–61	8–13 (1–9)	SIU Arena (4,626); Carbondale, IL
02/02/2013; 3:05 pm, ESPN3	at Illinois State	L 47–83	8–14 (1–10)	Redbird Arena (8,923); Normal, IL
02/05/2013; 7:00 pm, ESPN3	Wichita State	W 64–62	9–14 (2–10)	SIU Arena (4,852); Carbondale, IL
02/09/2013; 12:05 pm	at Indiana State	L 65–66	9–15 (2–11)	Hulman Center (5,821); Terre Haute, IN
02/13/2013; 7:05 pm	Evansville	W 65–56	10–15 (3–11)	SIU Arena (4,579); Carbondale, IL
02/16/2013; 7:05 pm, ESPN3	Missouri State	W 62–54	11–15 (4–11)	SIU Arena (5,476); Carbondale, IL
02/19/2013; 7:05 pm, ESPN3	at Creighton	L 45–59	11–16 (4–12)	CenturyLink Center Omaha (17,311); Omaha, NE
02/23/2013*; 2:05 pm	Miami (OH); BracketBusters	W 74–68 ^{OT}	12–16	SIU Arena (5,315); Carbondale, IL
02/27/2013; 7:00 pm, MVC–TV	Northern Iowa	W 63–57	13–16 (5–12)	SIU Arena (5,351); Carbondale, IL
03/02/2013; 7:05 pm	at Drake	W 66–63	14–16 (6–12)	Knapp Center (4,833); Des Moines, IA
Missouri Valley Conference tournament
03/07/2013; 8:30 pm, MVC–TV/ESPN3	vs. Missouri State; First Round	L 53–61	14–17	Scottrade Center (7,537); St.Louis, MO
*Non-conference game. ^{#}Rankings from AP Poll. (#) Tournament seedings in parentheses. All times are in Central Time.
