= 2012–13 Evansville Purple Aces men's basketball team =

American college basketball season

2012–13 Evansville Purple Aces men's basketball

CIT, Semifinals
- Conference: Missouri Valley Conference
- Record: 21–15 (10–8 The Valley)
- Head coach: Marty Simmons (6th season)
- Assistant coaches: Jimmy Elgas; Carson Harris; Geoff Alexander
- Home arena: Ford Center

2012–13 Missouri Valley Conference men's basketball standings
	Conf.				Overall
Team	W		L	PCT	W		L	PCT
No. 22 Creighton †	13	–	5	.722	28	–	8	.778
Wichita State	12	–	6	.667	30	–	9	.769
Northern Iowa	11	–	7	.611	21	–	15	.583
Evansville	10	–	8	.556	21	–	15	.583
Indiana State	9	–	9	.500	18	–	15	.545
Illinois State	8	–	10	.444	18	–	15	.545
Missouri State	7	–	11	.389	11	–	22	.333
Bradley	7	–	11	.389	18	–	17	.514
Drake	7	–	11	.389	15	–	17	.469
Southern Illinois	6	–	12	.333	14	–	17	.452
† 2013 MVC tournament winner As of April 6, 2013; Rankings from AP Poll

The 2012–13 Evansville Purple Aces men's basketball team represented the University of Evansville during the 2012–13 NCAA Division I men's basketball season. The Purple Aces, led by sixth-year head coach Marty Simmons, played their home games at the Ford Center and were members of the Missouri Valley Conference. They finished the season 21–15, 10–8 in MVC play to finish in fourth place. They lost in the quarterfinals of the Missouri Valley tournament to Indiana State. They were invited to the 2013 CIT, where they defeated Tennessee State, Eastern Kentucky, and Canisius to advance to the semifinals, where they lost to East Carolina. Senior guard Colt Ryan set the school's all-time record in scoring in the win at Canisius, and finished his career with 2,279 points, 43 points ahead of Larry Humes.

== Roster ==
Number	Name	Position	Height	Weight	Year	Hometown
0	Ryan Sawvell	Forward/center	6–8	200	Sophomore	Mundelein, Illinois
1	Jordan Nelson	Guard	6–1	160	Sophomore	Lincoln, Illinois
4	Lewis Jones	Guard/forward	6–3	205	Senior	Memphis, Tennessee
5	Troy Taylor	Guard	6–0	184	Senior	Anderson, Indiana
10	Jaylon Moore	Forward/center	6–7	230	Sophomore	Olive Branch, Mississippi
11	Colt Ryan	Guard/forward	6–5	210	Senior	Batesville, Indiana
12	Adam Wing	Guard	6–4	205	Freshman	Morehead, Kentucky
13	Jordan Jahr	Guard/forward	6–6	205	Sophomore	Austin, Texas
14	Andy Chinn	Guard	6–0	165	Senior	Tell City, Indiana
20	Brandon Williams	Guard	6–0	170	Senior	Charlotte, Tennessee
22	Ned Cox	Guard	6–1	185	Senior	San Antonio, Texas
23	Mike Leazer	Guard	6–3	170	Freshman	Mount Prospect, Illinois
25	Rokas Cesnulevicius	Forward/center	6–8	215	Sophomore	Alytus, Lithuania
31	D.J. Balentine	Guard	6–2	210	Freshman	Kokomo, Indiana
44	David Howard	Forward	6–8	225	Freshman	Nashville, Tennessee
55	Egidijus Mockevičius	Center	6–10	225	Freshman	Kuršėnai, Lithuania

== Schedule ==
Date time, TV	Opponent	Result	Record	Site (attendance) city, state
Exhibition
10/27/2012*; 7:00 pm	Southern Indiana	W 73–55		Ford Center (7,358); Evansville, IN
11/03/2012*; 4:00 pm	Illinois–Springfield	W 79–54		Ford Center (4,754); Evansville, IN
Regular season
11/10/2012*; 1:00 pm, ESPN3	at No. 22 Notre Dame; Coaches Vs. Cancer Classic	L 49–58	0–1	Edmund P. Joyce Center (8,224); Notre Dame, IN
11/15/2012*; 7:00 pm	Buffalo; Coaches Vs. Cancer Classic	L 50–56	0–2	Ford Center (3,572); Evansville, IN
11/16/2012*; 7:30 pm	Yale; Coaches Vs. Cancer Classic	W 66–56	1–2	Ford Center (4,112); Evansville, IN
11/17/2012*; 7:30 pm	Western Illinois; Coaches Vs. Cancer Classic	W 49–44	2–2	Ford Center (4,431); Evansville, IN
11/20/2012*; 7:30 pm	at Tennessee Tech	W 62–50	3–2	Eblen Center (N/A); Cookeville, TN
11/26/2012*; 7:00 pm	Alabama A&M	W 72–46	4–2	Ford Center (3,510); Evansville, IN
12/01/2012*; 3:30 pm	at Colorado State; MW–MVC Challenge	L 72–79	4–3	Moby Arena (3,970); Fort Collins, CO
12/05/2012*; 7:00 pm	Miami (OH)	W 94–68	5–3	Ford Center (3,481); Evansville, IN
12/08/2012*; 1:00 pm, ESPN3	Murray State	L 70–82	5–4	Ford Center (6,302); Evansville, IN
12/15/2012*; 1:05 pm	Alabama State	W 80–67	6–4	Ford Center (4,116); Evansville, IN
12/18/2012*; 7:05 pm	Oakland City	W 103–69	7–4	Ford Center (3,254); Evansville, IN
12/22/2012*; 1:00 pm	at No. 19 Butler	L 67–75	7–5	Hinkle Fieldhouse (9,190); Indianapolis, IN
12/29/2012; 7:00 pm, ESPN3	at No. 16 Creighton	L 70–87	7–6 (0–1)	CenturyLink Center Omaha (18,458); Omaha, NE
01/02/2013; 7:05 pm, ESPN3	Missouri State	W 62–59 ^{OT}	8–6 (1–1)	Ford Center (3,721); Evansville, IN
01/05/2013; 8:00 pm, MVC TV	Southern Illinois	W 85–68	9–6 (2–1)	Ford Center (6,032); Evansville, IN
01/09/2013; 7:00 pm	at Northern Iowa	W 62–59	10–6 (3–1)	McLeod Center (4,155); Cedar Falls, IA
01/13/2013; 3:35 pm, ESPN3	No. 23 Wichita State	W 71–67	11–6 (4–1)	Ford Center (5,485); Evansville, IN
01/16/2013; 7:05 pm	at Drake	L 69–83	11–7 (4–2)	Knapp Center (3,694); Des Moines, IA
01/19/2013; 7:05 pm, MVC TV	at Indiana State	L 62–72	11–8 (4–3)	Hulman Center (6,444); Terre Haute, IN
01/23/2013; 7:05 pm	Bradley	W 66–56	12–8 (5–3)	Ford Center (4,183); Evansville, IN
01/26/2013; 7:00 pm, MVC TV	at Illinois State	L 62–67	12–9 (5–4)	Redbird Arena (6,507); Normal, IL
01/29/2013; 7:00 pm	Northern Iowa	W 54–51 ^{OT}	13–9 (6–4)	Ford Center (3,681); Evansville, IN
02/02/2013; 2:05 pm	at Missouri State	L 61–62	13–10 (6–5)	JQH Arena (6,328); Springfield, MO
02/05/2013; 7:00 pm	at Bradley	L 70–76	13–11 (6–6)	Carver Arena (6,653); Peoria, IL
02/10/2013; 7:00 pm, ESPNU	Drake	W 84–78 ^{OT}	14–11 (7–6)	Ford Center (4,210); Evansville, IN
02/13/2013; 7:05 pm	at Southern Illinois	L 56–65	14–12 (7–7)	SIU Arena (4,579); Carbondale, IL
02/16/2013; 2:00 pm, ESPNU	Creighton	L 68–71	14–13 (7–8)	Ford Center (6,838); Evansville, IN
02/20/2013; 7:05 pm	Illinois State	W 79–62	15–13 (8–8)	Ford Center (4,166); Evansville, IN
02/23/2013*; 1:00 pm	at Wright State; BracketBusters	W 70–58	16–13	Nutter Center (3,428); Fairborn, OH
02/27/2013; 7:00 pm	at Wichita State	W 59–56	17–13 (9–8)	Charles Koch Arena (10,506); Wichita, KS
03/02/2013; 4:00 pm, MVC TV	Indiana State	W 84–68	18–13 (10–8)	Ford Center (6,909); Evansville, IN
2013 Missouri Valley Conference tournament
03/08/2013; 2:30 pm, MVC TV/ESPN3	vs. Indiana State; Quarterfinals	L 50–51	18–14	Scottrade Center (14,567); St.Louis, MO
2013 CIT
03/19/2013*; 7:00 pm	Tennessee State; First Round	W 84–72	19–14	Ford Center (2,324); Evansville, IN
03/23/2013*; 12:30 pm	Eastern Kentucky; Second Round	W 86–72	20–14	Ford Center (1,651); Evansville, IN
03/26/2013*; 6:00 pm	at Canisius; Quarterfinals	W 84–83	21–14	Koessler Athletic Center (1,403); Buffalo, NY
03/30/2013*; 4:00 pm	at East Carolina; Semifinals	L 58–81	21–15	Williams Arena (5,625); Greenville, NC
*Non-conference game. ^{#}Rankings from AP Poll. (#) Tournament seedings in parentheses. All times are in Central Time.
