= 2012–13 Saint Mary's Gaels men's basketball team =

American college basketball season

2012–13 Saint Mary's Gaels men's basketball

NCAA tournament, round of 64
- Conference: West Coast Conference
- Record: 28–7 (14–2 WCC)
- Head coach: Randy Bennett (12th season)
- Assistant coaches: Rick Croy; Adam Caporn; Eran Ganot
- Home arena: McKeon Pavilion

2012–13 West Coast Conference men's basketball standings
	Conf.				Overall
Team	W		L	PCT	W		L	PCT
No. 1 Gonzaga†	16	–	0	1.000	32	–	3	.914
Saint Mary's	14	–	2	.875	28	–	7	.800
BYU	10	–	6	.625	24	–	12	.667
Santa Clara	9	–	7	.563	26	–	12	.684
San Francisco	7	–	9	.438	15	–	16	.484
San Diego	7	–	9	.438	16	–	18	.471
Pepperdine	4	–	12	.250	12	–	18	.400
Portland	4	–	12	.250	11	–	21	.344
Loyola Marymount	1	–	15	.063	11	–	23	.324
† Conference tournament winner Rankings from AP poll

The 2012–13 Saint Mary's Gaels men's basketball team represented Saint Mary's College of California during the 2012–13 NCAA Division I men's basketball season. This was head coach Randy Bennett's twelfth season at Saint Mary's. The Gaels competed in the West Coast Conference and played their home games at the McKeon Pavilion. They finished the season 28–7, 14–2 in WCC play to finish in second place. They advanced to the championship game of the WCC tournament where they lost to Gonzaga. They received an at-large bid to the 2013 NCAA tournament where they defeated Middle Tennessee in the first four-round before falling in the second round to Memphis.

== Before the season ==
=== Departures ===
Name	Number	Pos.	Height	Weight	Year	Hometown	Notes
Rob Jones	22	F	6'6"	240	RS Senior	San Francisco, CA	Graduated
Clint Steindl	11	F	6'7"	195	Senior	Mackay, Queensland, Australia	Graduated- Signed a contract with Australasia National Basketball League's Cairns Taipans
Kenton Walker II	30	F	6'9"	240	RS Senior	San Diego, CA	Graduated

=== Recruiting ===
College recruiting information (2012)
Name	Hometown	School	Height	Weight	Commit date
Chris Reyes; PF	La Verne, California	Damien	6 ft 7 in (2.01 m)	205 lb (93 kg)	Oct 25, 2011
Chris Reyes; PF	Recruit ratings: (88)				
James Walker III; PF	Glendora, California	Citrus	6 ft 2 in (1.88 m)	N/A	Jun 26, 2012
James Walker III; PF	Recruit ratings: (JC)				
Overall recruit ranking: Scout: nr Rivals: nr ESPN: nr
Note: In many cases, Scout, Rivals, 247Sports, On3, and ESPN may conflict in their listings of height and weight.; In these cases, the average was taken. ESPN grades are on a 100-point scale.; Sources: "ESPN". ESPN.; "2012 Team Ranking". Rivals.

== Roster ==
2012–13 Saint Mary's Gaels men's basketball team
Players
Coaches

Pos.	#	Name	Height	Weight	Year	Previous school	Hometown
F	0	Brad Waldow	6 ft 9 in (2.06 m)	250 lb (113 kg)	RS So	Ponderosa	Shingle Springs, CA
G	1	Jorden Page	6 ft 1 in (1.85 m)	180 lb (82 kg)	Jr	AIS	Maroochydore, Queensland
G	2	Paul McCoy	5 ft 11 in (1.8 m)	175 lb (79 kg)	Sr	Grant; SMU	Portland, OR
F	3	Mitchell Young	6 ft 9 in (2.06 m)	235 lb (107 kg)	Sr	AIS	Logan City, Queensland
G	4	Matthew Dellavedova	6 ft 4 in (1.93 m)	190 lb (86 kg)	Sr	AIS	Maryborough, Victoria
C	5	Kyle Rowley	7 ft 0 in (2.13 m)	280 lb (127 kg)	Sr	Lake Forest Acad. Northwestern	Arima, Trinidad and Tobago
G	10	Zach Sanchez	6 ft 1 in (1.85 m)	175 lb (79 kg)	RS So	Bonita Vista	Bonita, CA
G	12	Jordan Giusti	6 ft 2 in (1.88 m)	185 lb (84 kg)	So	San Ramon Valley	San Ramon, CA
G	14	Stephen Holt	6 ft 4 in (1.93 m)	195 lb (88 kg)	Jr	Jesuit	Portland, OR
F	15	Beau Levesque	6 ft 6 in (1.98 m)	220 lb (100 kg)	Jr	De La Salle	Lafayette, CA
F	25	Tim Williams	6 ft 9 in (2.06 m)	235 lb (107 kg)	RS Sr	Antioch	Antioch, CA
F	42	Eividas Petrulis	6 ft 7 in (2.01 m)	210 lb (95 kg)	RS So	Šarūnas Marčiulionis Academy	Vilnius, Lithuania
C	33	Matt Hodgson	6 ft 11 in (2.11 m)	225 lb (102 kg)	RS Jr	Ipswich Grammar; Southern Utah	Booval, Queensland
F	23	Chris Reyes	6 ft 7 in (2.01 m)	205 lb (93 kg)	Fr	Damien	La Verne, CA
F	35	James Walker III	6 ft 2 in (1.88 m)	180 lb (82 kg)	Fr	Citrus	Glendora, CA

Head coach

- Randy Bennett (UC San Diego)

Assistant coach(es)

- Rick Croy (San Francisco State)
- Adam Caporn (Saint Mary's)
- Eran Ganot (Swarthmore)

Legend

- (C) Team captain
- (S) Suspended
- (I) Ineligible
- (W) Walk-on
- Injured
- Current redshirt

== Schedule and results ==
Date time, TV	Rank^{#}	Opponent^{#}	Result	Record	Site (attendance) city, state
Regular season
11/10/2012*; 7:00 pm		Sonoma State	W 95–69	1–0	McKeon Pavilion (2,397); Moraga, CA
11/15/2012*; 6:00 pm, CSNCA+		at Utah State	W 67–58	2–0	Dee Glen Smith Spectrum (9,077); Logan, UT
11/18/2012*; 5:00 pm		Eastern Washington	W 85–66	3–0	McKeon Pavilion (2,614); Moraga, CA
11/22/2012*; 1:30 pm, ESPN2		vs. Drexel; DIRECTV Classic	W 76–64	4–0	Anaheim Convention Center (1,107); Anaheim, CA
11/23/2012*; 12:30 pm, ESPN2		vs. Pacific; DIRECTV Classic Semi-finals	L 66–76	4–1	Anaheim Convention Center (1,477); Anaheim, CA
11/25/2012*; 3:30 pm, ESPNU		vs. Georgia Tech; DIRECTV Classic 3rd Place Game	L 56–65	4–2	Anaheim Convention Center (2,527); Anaheim, CA
12/01/2012*; 7:00 pm		Cal Poly	W 86–68	5–2	McKeon Pavilion (2,418); Moraga, CA
12/05/2012*; 5:00 pm		at Drake; Anaheim Classic	W 88–73	6–2	Knapp Center (3,410); Des Moines, IA
12/11/2012*; 7:00 pm		Jackson State	W 120–67	7–2	McKeon Pavilion (2,033); Moraga, CA
12/19/2012*; 7:00 pm		Pacific	W 74–46	8–2	McKeon Pavilion (2,507); Moraga, CA
12/23/2012*; 11:00 am		at Northern Iowa	L 75–82	8–3	McLeod Center (3,865); Cedar Falls, IA
12/27/2012*; 7:00 pm		Rhode Island	W 82–59	9–3	McKeon Pavilion (2,783); Moraga, CA
12/30/2012*; 2:30 pm		Yale	W 78–62	10–3	McKeon Pavilion (2,814); Moraga, CA
12/31/2012*; 5:00 pm, ESPN2		Harvard; Shamrock Office Solutions Classic	W 70–69	11–3	McKeon Pavilion (2,847); Moraga, CA
01/05/2013; 1:30 pm, WCC TV		Loyola Marymount	W 74–61	12–3 (1–0)	McKeon Pavilion (2,593); Moraga, CA
01/10/2013; 8:00 pm, ESPN2		at No. 9 Gonzaga	L 78–83	12–4 (1–1)	McCarthey Athletic Center (6,000); Spokane, WA
01/12/2013; 8:00 pm, CSNCA		San Francisco	W 78–72	13–4 (2–1)	McKeon Pavilion (3,500); Moraga, CA
01/16/2013; 8:00 pm, ESPNU		at BYU	W 70–69	14–4 (3–1)	Marriott Center (14,857); Provo, UT
01/19/2013; 7:30 pm, CSNCA/ROOT		at Portland	W 60–38	15–4 (4–1)	Chiles Center (2,625); Portland, OR
01/24/2013; 8:00 pm, CSNCA		San Diego	W 81–48	16–4 (5–1)	McKeon Pavilion (3,206); Moraga, CA
01/26/2013; 3:00 pm, CSNCA		Pepperdine	W 84–72	17–4 (6–1)	McKeon Pavilion (3,500); Moraga, CA
01/30/2013; 7:00 pm, CSNCA		at San Francisco	W 67–63	18–4 (7–1)	War Memorial Gymnasium (3,247); San Francisco, CA
02/02/2013; 4:30 pm, CSNCA		Portland	W 77–42	19–4 (8–1)	McKeon Pavilion (3,308); Moraga, CA
02/07/2013; 8:00 pm, ESPN2		at Santa Clara	W 84–63	20–4 (9–1)	Leavey Center (3,303); Santa Clara, CA
02/09/2013; 8:00 pm, ESPNU		at San Diego	W 74–64	21–4 (10–1)	Jenny Craig Pavilion (3,446); San Diego, CA
02/14/2013; 8:00 pm, ESPN2		No. 5 Gonzaga	L 60–77	21–5 (10–2)	McKeon Pavilion (3,500); Moraga, CA
02/16/2013; 4:00 pm, CSNCA		at Loyola Marymount	W 61–50	22–5 (11–2)	Gersten Pavilion (3,121); Los Angeles, CA
02/21/2013; 8:00 pm, ESPN2		BYU	W 64–57	23–5 (12–2)	McKeon Pavilion (3,500); Moraga, CA
02/23/2013*; 3:00 pm, ESPN		Creighton; ESPNU Ramada Worldwide BracketBusters	W 74–66	24–5	McKeon Pavilion (3,500); Moraga, CA
02/27/2013; 8:00 pm, ESPNU		at Pepperdine	W 87–48	25–5 (13–2)	Firestone Fieldhouse (926); Malibu, CA
03/02/2013; 7:00 pm, CSNCA		Santa Clara	W 80–67	26–5 (14–2)	McKeon Pavilion (3,500); Moraga, CA
2013 West Coast Conference men's basketball tournament
03/09/2013; 8:45 pm, ESPN2	(2)	vs. (6) San Diego; Semifinals	W 69–66 ^{OT}	27–5	Orleans Arena (7,896); Las Vegas, NV
03/11/2013; 6:00 pm, ESPN	(2)	vs. (1) No. 1 Gonzaga; Championship	L 51–65	27–6	Orleans Arena (7,896); Las Vegas, NV
2013 NCAA tournament
03/19/2013*; 6:22 pm, truTV	(11 MW)	vs. (11 MW) Middle Tennessee; First Four	W 67–54	28–6	UD Arena (12,027); Dayton, OH
03/21/2013*; 11:45 am, CBS	(11 MW)	vs. (6 MW) No. 19 Memphis; Second Round	L 52–54	28–7	The Palace of Auburn Hills (18,863); Auburn Hills, MI
*Non-conference game. ^{#}Rankings from AP Poll/Coaches' Poll. (#) Tournament seedings in parentheses. All times are in Pacific Time. (#) during NCAA Tournament is seed with Region MW=Midwest.
