= 2012–13 Drake Bulldogs men's basketball team =

American college basketball season

2012–13 Drake Bulldogs men's basketball
- Conference: Missouri Valley Conference
- Record: 15–17 (7–11 The Valley)
- Head coach: Mark Phelps (5th season)
- Assistant coaches: Chris Brazelton; Stan Johnson; Brett Nelson
- Home arena: Knapp Center

2012–13 Missouri Valley Conference men's basketball standings
	Conf.				Overall
Team	W		L	PCT	W		L	PCT
No. 22 Creighton †	13	–	5	.722	28	–	8	.778
Wichita State	12	–	6	.667	30	–	9	.769
Northern Iowa	11	–	7	.611	21	–	15	.583
Evansville	10	–	8	.556	21	–	15	.583
Indiana State	9	–	9	.500	18	–	15	.545
Illinois State	8	–	10	.444	18	–	15	.545
Missouri State	7	–	11	.389	11	–	22	.333
Bradley	7	–	11	.389	18	–	17	.514
Drake	7	–	11	.389	15	–	17	.469
Southern Illinois	6	–	12	.333	14	–	17	.452
† 2013 MVC tournament winner As of April 6, 2013; Rankings from AP Poll

The 2012–13 Drake Bulldogs men's basketball team represented Drake University during the 2012–13 NCAA Division I men's basketball season. The Bulldogs, led by fifth year head coach Mark Phelps, played their home games at the Knapp Center and were members of the Missouri Valley Conference. They finished the season 15–17, 7–11 in MVC play to finish in three way tie for seventh place. They lost in the quarterfinals of the Missouri Valley tournament to Creighton, and head coach Mark Phelps was fired 6 days later.

== Roster ==
Number	Name	Position	Height	Weight	Year	Hometown
0	Kori Babineaux	Guard	6–4	203	Freshman	Folsom, California
1	Jordan Clarke	Forward	6–8	256	Senior	Rockville, Maryland
2	Gary Ricks, Jr.	Guard	6–1	182	Junior	Los Angeles, California
3	Richard Carter	Guard	5–11	177	Junior	Detroit, Michigan
4	Chris Hines	Forward	6–1	192	Senior	Houston, Texas
10	Jeremy Jeffers	Forward	6–6	216	Sophomore	Wilson, North Carolina
11	Karl Madison	Guard	5–9	186	Sophomore	Springfield, Illinois
21	Robert Puleikis	Center	6–10	221	Freshman	Detroit, Michigan
22	Micah Mason	Guard	6–2	174	Freshman	Natrona Heights, Pennsylvania
23	Mitch McLaughlin	Guard	6–0	181	Freshman	Cedar Rapids, Iowa
24	Joey King	Forward	6–9	219	Freshman	Eagan, Minnesota
25	Matt Bowie	Forward	6–7	217	Senior	Oskaloosa, Iowa
34	Ben Simons	Forward	6–8	209	Senior	Cadillac, Michigan
40	Daddy Ugbede	Forward	6–6	216	Freshman	Gardena, California
45	Seth VanDeest	Center	6–11	269	Junior	Bettendorf, Iowa

== Schedule ==
Date time, TV	Opponent	Result	Record	Site (attendance) city, state
Exhibition
11/03/2012*; 7:00 pm	Southwest Baptist	W 101–80		Knapp Center (2,813); Des Moines, IA
Regular season
11/10/2012*; 11:00 pm	William Jewell	W 96–66	1–0	Knapp Center (3,273); Des Moines, IA
11/17/2012*; 5:00 pm	at Detroit	L 79–85	1–1	Calihan Hall (2,047); Detroit, MI
11/22/2012*; 10:30 pm, ESPN2	vs. California; DIRECTV Classic	L 70–73	1–2	Anaheim Convention Center (1,087); Anaheim, CA
11/23/2012*; 8:30 pm, ESPNU	vs. Rice; DIRECTV Classic	W 77–66	2–2	Anaheim Convention Center (1,627); Anaheim, CA
11/25/2012*; 12:30 pm, ESPNU	vs. Xavier; DIRECTV Classic	L 70–74	2–3	Anaheim Convention Center (N/A); Anaheim, CA
11/30/2012*; 9:00 pm	at Nevada; MW–MVC Challenge	W 76–66	3–3	Lawlor Events Center (6,469); Reno, NV
12/05/2012*; 7:00 pm	Saint Mary's	L 73–88	3–4	Knapp Center (3,410); Des Moines, IA
12/08/2012*; 7:00 pm, MC22	IPFW	W 74–64	4–4	Knapp Center (2,861); Des Moines, IA
12/15/2012*; 4:00 pm, MC22	vs. Iowa State; Big Four Classic	L 77–86	4–5	Wells Fargo Arena (13,180); Des Moines, IA
12/19/2012*; 7:05 pm	North Carolina Central	W 72–69	5–5	Knapp Center (2,388); Des Moines, IA
12/22/2012*; 2:05 pm	Eastern Illinois	W 74–56	6–5	Knapp Center (2,669); Des Moines, IA
12/29/2012; 7:00 pm, MC22	at Bradley	L 57–67	6–6 (0–1)	Carver Arena (7,534); Peoria, IL
01/02/2013; 7:05 pm, ESPN3	Wichita State	L 63–75	6–7 (0–2)	Knapp Center (2,792); Des Moines, IA
01/05/2013; 7:05 pm, MC22/ESPN3	Missouri State	L 65–77	6–8 (0–3)	Knapp Center (3,804); Des Moines, IA
01/08/2013; 7:05 pm, ESPN3	at No. 13 Creighton	L 61–91	6–9 (0–4)	CenturyLink Center Omaha (18,073); Omaha, NE
01/12/2013; 7:00 pm	at Illinois State	W 82–77	7–9 (1–4)	Redbird Arena (5,706); Normal, IL
01/16/2013; 7:05 pm, MC22	Evansville	W 83–69	8–9 (2–4)	Knapp Center (3,694); Des Moines, IA
01/20/2013; 2:00 pm	at Northern Iowa	L 55–85	8–10 (2–5)	McLeod Center (4,215); Cedar Falls, IA
01/23/2013; 7:05 pm, FS Midwest	No. 17 Creighton	W 74–69	9–10 (3–5)	Knapp Center (6,162); Des Moines, IA
01/27/2013; 2:00 pm, ESPN3	at Missouri State	L 72–78	9–11 (3–6)	Redbird Arena (5,824); Normal, IL
01/30/2013; 7:05 pm	at Southern Illinois	W 61–56	10–11 (4–6)	SIU Arena (4,626); Carbondale, IL
02/02/2013; 6:30 pm, FS Midwest	Indiana State	W 74–71 ^{OT}	11–11 (5–6)	Knapp Center (4,439); Des Moines, IA
02/06/2013; 7:05 pm, MC22	Illinois State	L 86–94	11–12 (5–7)	Knapp Center (4,133); Des Moines, IA
02/10/2013; 7:00 pm, ESPNU	at Evansville	L 78–84 ^{OT}	11–13 (5–8)	Ford Center (4,210); Evansville, IN
02/13/2013; 7:00 pm, ESPN3	at Wichita State	L 56–71	11–14 (5–9)	Charles Koch Arena (10,211); Wichita, KS
02/16/2013; 7:00 pm, MC22	Northern Iowa	L 64–71	11–15 (5–10)	Knapp Center (6,711); Des Moines, IA
02/20/2013; 7:05 pm, MC22	Bradley	W 92–84 ^{OT}	12–15 (6–10)	Knapp Center (3,825); Des Moines, IA
02/23/2013*; 7:05 pm	Green Bay; BracketBusters	W 71–54	13–15	Knapp Center (3,892); Des Moines, IA
02/27/2013; 6:05 pm	at Indiana State	W 67–56	14–15 (7–10)	Hulman Center (5,054); Terre Haute, IN
03/02/2013; 7:05 pm, MC22	Southern Illinois	L 63–66	14–16 (7–11)	Knapp Center (4,833); Des Moines, IA
Missouri Valley Conference tournament
03/07/2013; 6:00 pm, MVC TV/ESPN3	vs. Bradley; First Round	W 81–66	15–16	Scottrade Center (7,537); St.Louis, MO
03/08/2013; 12:05 pm, ESPN3	vs. Creighton; Quarterfinals	L 53–65	15–17	Scottrade Center (14,567); St.Louis, MO
*Non-conference game. ^{#}Rankings from AP Poll. (#) Tournament seedings in parentheses. All times are in Central Time.
