= 2012–13 Illinois State Redbirds men's basketball team =

American college basketball season

2012–13 Illinois State Redbirds men's basketball
- Conference: Missouri Valley Conference
- Record: 18–15 (8–10 MVC)
- Head coach: Dan Muller (1st season)
- Assistant coaches: Rob Judson; Dana Ford; Torrey Ward
- Home arena: Doug Collins Court at Redbird Arena

2012–13 Missouri Valley Conference men's basketball standings
	Conf.				Overall
Team	W		L	PCT	W		L	PCT
No. 22 Creighton †	13	–	5	.722	28	–	8	.778
Wichita State	12	–	6	.667	30	–	9	.769
Northern Iowa	11	–	7	.611	21	–	15	.583
Evansville	10	–	8	.556	21	–	15	.583
Indiana State	9	–	9	.500	18	–	15	.545
Illinois State	8	–	10	.444	18	–	15	.545
Missouri State	7	–	11	.389	11	–	22	.333
Bradley	7	–	11	.389	18	–	17	.514
Drake	7	–	11	.389	15	–	17	.469
Southern Illinois	6	–	12	.333	14	–	17	.452
† 2013 MVC tournament winner As of April 6, 2013; Rankings from AP Poll

The 2012–13 Illinois State Redbirds men's basketball team represented Illinois State University during the 2012–13 NCAA Division I men's basketball season. The Redbirds, led by first-year head coach Dan Muller, played their home games at Redbird Arena in Normal, Illinois as a member of the Missouri Valley Conference. They finished the season 18–15, 8–10 in conference play, to finish in sixth place. As the number six seed in the MVC tournament, they defeated Northern Iowa in a quarterfinal game before losing to Wichita State in a semifinal game.

== Roster ==
2012–13 Illinois State Redbirds men's basketball team
Players
Coaches

Pos.	#	Name	Height	Weight	Year	Previous school	Hometown
G	0	Kaza Keane	6 ft 1 in (1.85 m)	185 lb (84 kg)	Fr	Christian Faith Center Academy	Ajax, Ontario
G	1	Tyler Brown	6 ft 4 in (1.93 m)	185 lb (84 kg)	Sr	Apollo High School; Morehead State; Marshalltown Community College	Owensboro, KY
G	2	Bryant Allen	6 ft 0 in (1.83 m)	180 lb (82 kg)	Jr	Maplewood–Richmond Heights High School; Minnesota	Maplewood, MO
G	5	Anthony Cousin	5 ft 11 in (1.8 m)	190 lb (86 kg)	Sr	South Kent School; Butler Community College	Anchorage, AK
C	10	John Jones	6 ft 9 in (2.06 m)	260 lb (118 kg)	So	The Howe School	Saint Michael, Barbados
F	13	John Wilkins	6 ft 9 in (2.06 m)	230 lb (104 kg)	Sr	Lycée Le Mans Sud; Southeastern Community College	Antibes, France
G	15	Nick Zeisloft	6 ft 4 in (1.93 m)	185 lb (84 kg)	RS Fr	Lyons Township High School	LaGrange, IL
G	21	Geoffrey Allen	6 ft 6 in (1.98 m)	180 lb (82 kg)	So	Pacific Hills School; Eastern Washington	Los Angeles, CA
F	22	Jon Ekey	6 ft 7 in (2.01 m)	220 lb (100 kg)	RS Jr	William Chrisman High School	Independence, MO
G	24	Zeke Upshaw	6 ft 6 in (1.98 m)	215 lb (98 kg)	RS Jr	University High School	Chicago, IL
F	32	Jackie Carmichael	6 ft 9 in (2.06 m)	240 lb (109 kg)	Sr	South Kent School	Manhattan, KS
C	42	Jordan Threloff	6 ft 10 in (2.08 m)	255 lb (116 kg)	RS So	DeKalb High School	DeKalb, IL
G	44	Johnny Hill	6 ft 3 in (1.91 m)	180 lb (82 kg)	So	Glenbard East High School	Glendale Heights, IL

Head coach

- Dan Muller (Illinois State)

Assistant coach(es)

- Rob Judson (Illinois)
- Dana Ford (Illinois State)
- Torrey Ward (UAB)

Legend

- (C) Team captain
- (S) Suspended
- (I) Ineligible
- (W) Walk-on
- Injured
- Current redshirt

Roster
Last update: March 10, 2013

== Schedule and results ==
Date time, TV	Rank^{#}	Opponent^{#}	Result	Record	High points	High rebounds	High assists	Site (attendance) city, state
Exhibition Season
November 5, 2012*; 7:05 pm		Quincy	W 93–64		16 – Ekey	10 – Carmichael	–	Doug Collins Court at Redbird Arena (4,463); Normal, IL
Regular Season
November 12, 2012*; 7:05 pm		California-Santa Barbara	W 100–72	1–0	27 – Carmichael	10 – Carmichael	5 – Keane	Doug Collins Court at Redbird Arena (5,848); Normal, IL
November 15, 2012*; 6:00 pm, NBCSN		at Drexel	W 86–84 ^{OT}	2–0	21 – Carmichael	8 – Ekey	4 – Keane	Daskalakis Athletic Center (2,532); Philadelphia, PA
November 18, 2012*; 2:05 pm		Delaware State; South Padre Island Invitational [Campus Site]	W 87–48	3–0	14 – Brown	8 – Threloff	4 – Threloff, Hill, Keane	Doug Collins Court at Redbird Arena (5,660); Normal, IL
November 20, 2012*; 7:05 pm		Fairleigh Dickinson; South Padre Island Invitational [Campus Site]	W 91–58	4–0	17 – Carmichael	7 – Carmichael	9 – Keane	Doug Collins Court at Redbird Arena (4,951); Normal, IL
November 23, 2012*; 5:00 pm, CBSSN		vs. Alabama-Birmingham; South Padre Island Invitational [Semifinal]	W 77–65	5–0	30 – B.Allen	8 – Ekey	4 – Keane	South Padre Island; Convention Centre (800); South Padre Island, TX
November 24, 2012*; 7:00 pm, CBSSN		vs. Northwestern; South Padre Island Invitational [Final]	L 69–72 ^{OT}	5–1	36 – Brown	12 – Carmichael	9 – Keane	South Padre Island; Convention Centre (801); South Padre Island, TX
December 1, 2012*; 12:00 pm, CSN Chicago		at No. 5 Louisville	L 66–69	5–2	25 – Brown	9 – Carmichael	6 – Hill	KFC Yum! Center (19,816); Louisville, KY
December 4, 2012*; 7:05 pm		Wyoming; Mountain West– Missouri Valley Challenge	L 67–81	5–3	22 – Brown	7 – Carmichael	4 – Hill, Keane	Doug Collins Court at Redbird Arena (6,561); Normal, IL
December 8, 2012*; 7:05 pm, CSN Chicago		Western Michigan	W 85–63	6–3	24 – Carmichael	7 – Carmichael	10 – Hill	Doug Collins Court at Redbird Arena (6,269); Normal, IL
December 16, 2012*; 4:35 pm		Morgan State	W 87–68	7–3	30 – Carmichael	9 – Carmichael	6 – Hill	Doug Collins Court at Redbird Arena (4,911); Normal, IL
December 19, 2012*; 6:00 pm, CSN Chicago		at Dayton	W 74–73	8–3	25 – Carmichael	12 – Carmichael	5 – Brown, Hill, Keane	University of Dayton Arena (11,879); Dayton, OH
December 22, 2012*; 2:05 pm		Austin Peay State	W 83–57	9–3	18 – Carmichael	11 – Carmichael	6 – Hill, Keane	Doug Collins Court at Redbird Arena (5,119); Normal, IL
December 30, 2012; 12:05 pm		at Indiana State	L 75–77	9–4 (0–1)	16 – Ekey	14 – Carmichael	5 – B.Allen	Hulman Center (5,808); Terre Haute, IN
January 2, 2013; 7:05 pm, CSN Chicago/FSMW		Creighton	L 72–79	9–5 (0–2)	15 – Brown, B.Allen	6 – Carmichael, Ekey	6 – Brown, Keane	Doug Collins Court at Redbird Arena (8,813); Normal, IL
January 5, 2013; 7:05 pm		Northern Iowa	L 60–70	9–6 (0–3)	19 – Carmichael	12 – Carmichael	3 – Brown, Keane	Doug Collins Court at Redbird Arena (6,951); Normal, IL
January 8, 2013; 7:05 pm		at Missouri State	L 55–62	9–7 (0–4)	21 – Carmichael	12 – Carmichael	3 – Carmichael	JQH Arena (5,134); Springfield, MO
January 12, 2013; 7:05 pm		Drake	L 77–82	9–8 (0–5)	24 – Hill	12 – Carmichael	4 – B.Allen	Doug Collins Court at Redbird Arena (5,706); Normal, IL
January 16, 2013; 7:00 pm, ESPN3		at Wichita State	L 62–74	9–9 (0–6)	22 – Carmichael	9 – Brown, Carmichael	3 – Brown, B.Allen	Charles Koch Arena (10,323); Wichita, KS
January 20, 2013; 7:00 pm, ESPNU		at Southern Illinois	W 70–56	10–9 (1–6)	22 – Brown	14 – Carmichael	6 – Hill	SIU Arena (5,254); Carbondale, IL
January 23, 2013; 7:05 pm		Indiana State	W 77–59	11–9 (2–6)	18 – Hill	9 – Carmichael	2 – Carmichael, Keane	Doug Collins Court at Redbird Arena (5,519); Normal, IL
January 26, 2013; 7:05 pm, CSN Chicago/FSMW		Evansville	W 67–62	12–9 (3–6)	24 – Carmichael	14 – Carmichael	2 – Brown, Keane	Doug Collins Court at Redbird Arena (6,507); Normal, IL
January 29, 2013; 7:07 pm, CSN Chicago/FSMW		at Bradley; I–74 Rivalry	L 77–83	12–10 (3–7)	16 – Carmichael, Wilkins	8 – Brown	6 – Brown	Carver Arena (9,088); Peoria, IL
February 2, 2013; 3:05 pm, CSN Chicago		Southern Illinois	W 83–47	13–10 (4–7)	16 – Brown	11 – Carmichael	5 – Hill	Doug Collins Court at Redbird Arena (8,923); Normal, IL
February 6, 2013; 7:05 pm, CSN Chicago		at Drake	W 94–86	14–10 (5–7)	25 – Brown	8 – Ekey	9 – Brown	The Knapp Center (4,133); Des Moines, IA
February 9, 2013; 9:05 pm, ESPN2		at No. 16 Creighton	W 75–72	15–10 (6–7)	27 – Brown	7 – Hill	5 – Brown	CenturyLink Center Omaha (18,494); Omaha, NE
February 13, 2013; 7:05 pm		Bradley; I–74 Rivalry	W 79–59	16–10 (7–7)	27 – Carmichael	13 – Carmichael	5 – Brown	Doug Collins Court at Redbird Arena (8,417); Normal, IL
February 17, 2013; 7:05 pm, ESPNU		Wichita State	L 67–68	16–11 (7–8)	17 – Brown	9 – Carmichael	3 – Brown	Doug Collins Court at Redbird Arena (9,510); Normal, IL
February 20, 2013; 7:05 pm		at Evansville	L 62–79	16–12 (7–9)	21 – Brown	14 – Carmichael	4 – Cousin	Ford Center (4,166); Evansville, IN
February 23, 2013*; 8:00 pm		at Utah State; Ramada Worldwide; BracketBusters	L 71–80	16–13	35 – Brown	10 – Brown, Carmichael	5 – B.Allen	Dee Glen Smith Spectrum (7,348); Logan, UT
February 27, 2013; 7:05 pm		Missouri State	W 86–50	17–13 (8–9)	25 – Brown	11 – Carmichael	5 – Keane	Doug Collins Court at Redbird Arena (5,832); Normal, IL
March 2, 2013; 7:00 pm		at Northern Iowa	L 72–80	17–14 (8–10)	28 – Brown	9 – Brown	1 – Carmichael, Hill, Keane	McLeod Center (6,621); Cedar Falls, IA
State Farm Missouri Valley Conference {MVC} Tournament
March 8, 2013*; 8:35 pm, CSN Chicago/FSMW	(6)	vs. (3) Northern Iowa; Quarterfinal	W 73–65	18–14	28 – Brown	10 – Carmichael	3 – Hill	Scottrade Center (14,004); St. Louis, MO
March 9, 2013*; 4:05 pm, CSN Chicago/FSMW	(6)	vs. (2) Wichita State; Semifinal	L 51–66	18–15	22 – Carmichael	7 – Wilkins	2 – Brown, Ekey, B.Allen	Scottrade Center (18,262); St. Louis, MO
*Non-conference game. ^{#}Rankings from AP Poll. (#) Tournament seedings in parentheses. All times are in Central Standard Time.
