= 2012–13 Missouri State Bears basketball team =

American college basketball season

2012–13 Missouri State Bears men's basketball
- Conference: Missouri Valley Conference
- Record: 11–22 (7–11 The Valley)
- Head coach: Paul Lusk (2nd season)
- Assistant coaches: Patrick Baldwin; Jermaine Henderson
- Home arena: JQH Arena

2012–13 Missouri Valley Conference men's basketball standings
	Conf.				Overall
Team	W		L	PCT	W		L	PCT
No. 22 Creighton †	13	–	5	.722	28	–	8	.778
Wichita State	12	–	6	.667	30	–	9	.769
Northern Iowa	11	–	7	.611	21	–	15	.583
Evansville	10	–	8	.556	21	–	15	.583
Indiana State	9	–	9	.500	18	–	15	.545
Illinois State	8	–	10	.444	18	–	15	.545
Missouri State	7	–	11	.389	11	–	22	.333
Bradley	7	–	11	.389	18	–	17	.514
Drake	7	–	11	.389	15	–	17	.469
Southern Illinois	6	–	12	.333	14	–	17	.452
† 2013 MVC tournament winner As of April 6, 2013; Rankings from AP Poll

The 2012–13 Missouri State Bears basketball team represented Missouri State University during the 2012–13 NCAA Division I men's basketball season. The Bears, led by second year head coach Paul Lusk, played their home games at JQH Arena and were members of the Missouri Valley Conference. They finished the season 11–22, 7–11 in MVC play to finish in a three-way tie for seventh place. They lost in the quarterfinals of the Missouri Valley tournament to Wichita State.

== Roster ==
Number	Name	Position	Height	Weight	Year	Hometown
0	Perry Jackson	Guard	6-1	190	Junior	Oakland, California
1	Keith Pickens	Forward	6–4	203	Junior	St. Louis, Missouri
3	Michael Simpson	Forward	6–5	199	Freshman	Spring, Texas
5	Jarmar Gulley	Forward	6–5	220	Senior	Beaumont, Texas
10	Tomie Aromona	Guard	5–10	165	Sophomore	Kansas City, Missouri
11	Marcus Marshall	Guard	6–3	181	Freshman	St. Paul, Minnesota
15	Drew Wilson	Forward	6–7	217	Freshman	Tulsa, Oklahoma
20	Gavin Thurman	Forward	6–6	223	Freshman	Wichita, Kansas
23	Dorrian Williams	Guard	6–2	190	Freshman	Oklahoma City, Oklahoma
30	Nathan Scheer	Guard/Forward	6–5	205	Junior	Washington, Missouri
35	Bruce marshall	Center	6–10	215	Freshman	Fayette, Missouri
42	Christian Kirk	Forward	6–7	225	Sophomore	Springfield, Missouri

== Schedule ==
Date time, TV	Opponent	Result	Record	Site (attendance) city, state
Costa Rica Foreign Tour
08/08/2012*; 9:30 pm	at Costa Rica National Team	W 84–28		San Jose Indoor Club (89); Goicoechea, Costa Rica
08/09/2012*; 9:00 pm	at Colegio de Abogados	W 97–39		(71); San José, Costa Rica
08/10/2012*; 9:00 pm	at Cedes Don Bosco	W 83–42		Don Bosco School (143); San José, Costa Rica
08/11/2012*; 9:00 pm	at Grecia	W 77–43		(248); Grecia, Costa Rica
Exhibition
10/30/2012*; 7:00 pm	Missouri Western State	W 81–67		JQH Arena (5,031); Springfield, MO
11/03/2012*; 7:00 pm	McKendree	W 82–54		JQH Arena (5,341); Springfield, MO
Regular season
11/09/2012*; 7:00 pm	Philander Smith	W 89–61	1–0	JQH Arena (5,888); Springfield, MO
11/17/2012*; 1:00 pm	No. 25 San Diego State; MWC–MVC Challenge	L 44–60	1–1	JQH Arena (7,272); Springfield, MO
11/19/2012*; 7:00 pm	Jacksonville; Hoops for Hope Challenge	L 58–64	1–2	JQH Arena (5,046); Springfield, MO
11/21/2012*; 7:00 pm	Malone; Hoops for Hope Challenge	W 82–49	2–2	JQH Arena (3,712); Springfield, MO
11/24/2012*; 6:00 pm	vs. South Carolina; Hoops for Hope Challenge	L 67–74 ^{OT}	2–3	(303); Puerto Vallarta, Mexico
11/25/2012*; 6:00 pm	vs. SMU; Hoops for Hope Challenge	L 61–62	2–4	(306); Puerto Vallarta, Mexico
12/01/2012*; 4:30 pm	Oral Roberts	L 52–72	2–5	JQH Arena (6,475); Springfield, MO
12/05/2012*; 7:00 pm	at Tulsa	L 42–61	2–6	Reynolds Center (4,105); Tulsa, OK
12/08/2012*; 3:00 pm	at No. 23 Oklahoma State	L 42–62	2–7	Gallagher-Iba Arena (8,740); Stillwater, OK
12/15/2012*; 7:00 pm	Valparaiso	L 54–62	2–8	JQH Arena (5,465); Springfield, MO
12/18/2012*; 7:00 pm, ESPN3	at Alabama A&M	L 47–59	2–9	Elmore Gymnasium (290); Huntsville, AL
12/22/2012*; 8:00 pm, ESPN3	at New Mexico State	L 51–71	2–10	Pan American Center (4,877); Las Cruces, NM
12/30/2012; 5:30 pm	Southern Illinois	W 70–59	3–10 (1–0)	JQH Arena (7,662); Springfield, MO
01/02/2013; 7:05 pm, ESPN3	at Evansville	L 59–62 ^{OT}	3–11 (1–1)	Ford Center (3,721); Evansville, IN
01/05/2013; 7:05 pm, ESPN3	at Drake	W 77–65	4–11 (2–1)	Knapp Center (3,804); Des Moines, IA
01/08/2013; 7:05 pm	Illinois State	W 62–55	5–11 (3–1)	JQH Arena (5,134); Springfield, MO
01/11/2013; 7:05 pm, ESPN3	No. 13 Creighton	L 52–74	5–12 (3–2)	JQH Arena (7,895); Springfield, MO
01/16/2013; 6:05 pm, ESPN3	at Indiana State	L 60–68	5–13 (3–3)	Hulman Center (5,593); Terre Haute, IN
01/19/2013; 1:00 pm, ESPN3	at Bradley	L 66–69	5–14 (3–4)	Carver Arena (7,756); Peoria, IL
01/23/2013; 7:05 pm, ESPN3	No. 20 Wichita State	L 52–62	5–15 (3–5)	JQH Arena (6,448); Springfield, MO
01/27/2013; 2:00 pm, ESPN3	Drake	W 78–72	6–15 (4–5)	JQH Arena (5,824); Springfield, MO
01/30/2013; 7:00 pm, FSN	at No. 21 Creighton	L 77–91	6–16 (4–6)	CenturyLink Center Omaha (16,811); Omaha, NE
02/02/2013; 2:05 pm	Evansville	W 62–61	7–16 (5–6)	JQH Arena (6,328); Springfield, MO
02/05/2013; 7:00 pm, ESPN3	at Northern Iowa	L 37–48	7–17 (5–7)	McLeod Center (3,573); Cedar Falls, IA
02/09/2013; 6:30 pm, FSN/ESPN3	at Wichita State	L 50–79	7–18 (5–8)	Charles Koch Arena (10,506); Wichita, KS
02/12/2013; 7:00 pm, FSN/ESPN3	Indiana State	W 67–65	8–18 (6–8)	JQH Arena (5,255); Springfield, MO
02/16/2013; 7:05 pm, ESPN3	at Southern Illinois	L 54–62	8–19 (6–9)	SIU Arena (5,476); Carbondale, IL
02/19/2013; 7:00 pm	Northern Iowa	L 63–69	8–20 (6–10)	JQH Arena (5,704); Springfield, MO
02/23/2013*; 11:00 pm	at Eastern Michigan; BracketBusters	W 57–54	9–20	Convocation Center (676); Ypsilanti, MI
02/27/2013; 7:05 pm	at Illinois State	L 50–86	9–21 (6–11)	Redbird Arena (5,832); Normal, IL
03/02/2013; 7:05 pm	Bradley	W 64–56	10–21 (7–11)	JQH Arena (7,099); Springfield, MO
Missouri Valley Conference tournament
03/07/2013; 8:30 pm, ESPN3	vs. Southern Illinois; First Round	W 61–53	11–21	Scottrade Center (7,537); St.Louis, MO
03/08/2013; 6:05 pm, ESPN3	vs. Wichita State; Quarterfinals	L 59–69	11–22	Scottrade Center (14,004); St.Louis, MO
*Non-conference game. ^{#}Rankings from AP Poll. (#) Tournament seedings in parentheses. All times are in Central Time.
