= 2012–13 Northern Iowa Panthers men's basketball team =

American college basketball season

2012–13 Northern Iowa Panthers men's basketball

CIT, Semifinals
- Conference: Missouri Valley Conference
- Record: 21–15 (11–7 The Valley)
- Head coach: Ben Jacobson (7th season)
- Assistant coaches: Erik Crawford; Kyle Green; P.J. Hogan
- Home arena: McLeod Center

2012–13 Missouri Valley Conference men's basketball standings
	Conf.				Overall
Team	W		L	PCT	W		L	PCT
No. 22 Creighton †	13	–	5	.722	28	–	8	.778
Wichita State	12	–	6	.667	30	–	9	.769
Northern Iowa	11	–	7	.611	21	–	15	.583
Evansville	10	–	8	.556	21	–	15	.583
Indiana State	9	–	9	.500	18	–	15	.545
Illinois State	8	–	10	.444	18	–	15	.545
Missouri State	7	–	11	.389	11	–	22	.333
Bradley	7	–	11	.389	18	–	17	.514
Drake	7	–	11	.389	15	–	17	.469
Southern Illinois	6	–	12	.333	14	–	17	.452
† 2013 MVC tournament winner As of April 6, 2013; Rankings from AP Poll

The 2012–13 Northern Iowa Panthers men's basketball team represented the University of Northern Iowa during the 2012–13 NCAA Division I men's basketball season. The Panthers, led by seventh year head coach Ben Jacobson, played their home games at McLeod Center and were members of the Missouri Valley Conference. They finished the season 21–15, 11–7 in MVC play to finish in third place. They lost in the quarterfinals of the Missouri Valley tournament to Illinois State. They were invited to the 2013 CIT where they defeated North Dakota, UIC and Bradley to advance to the semifinals where they lost to Weber State.

== Roster ==
Number	Name	Position	Height	Weight	Year	Hometown
1	Deon Mitchell	Guard	6–1	203	Sophomore	Pflugerville, Texas
4	Chip Rank	Forward	6–6	235	Junior	Cedarburg, Wisconsin
5	Matt Bohannon	Guard	6–4	210	RS Freshman	Marion, Iowa
10	Seth Tuttle	Forward	6–8	221	Sophomore	Sheffield, Iowa
11	Wes Washpun	Guard	6–1	170	Freshman	Cedar Rapids, Iowa
12	Marvin Singleton	Forward	6–6	245	Sophomore	St. Louis Park, Minnesota
14	Nate Buss	Forward	6–8	216	Sophomore	Charles City, Iowa
20	Jake Koch	Forward	6–9	255	RS Senior	Ashwaubenon, Wisconsin
21	Matt Morrison	Guard	6–0	180	RS Junior	Solon, Iowa
23	Marc Sonnen	Guard	6–3	190	Senior	St. Paul, Minnesota
24	Max Martino	Guard	6–5	210	RS Sophomore	Cedar Rapids, Iowa
31	Chris Olivier	Forward	6–8	245	RS Freshman	Glenwood, Illinois
32	Matt MacDougall	Guard	6–4	175	Freshman	Cedar Rapids, Iowa
33	Austin Pehl	Center	6–10	265	RS Senior	Cedar Falls, Iowa
34	Tyler Lange	Forward	6–6	226	RS Junior	Sac City, Iowa
52	Anthony James	Guard	6–0	180	RS Senior	St. Louis, Missouri

== Schedule ==
Date time, TV	Opponent	Result	Record	Site (attendance) city, state
Exhibition
10/27/2012*; 1:00 pm	Briar Cliff	W 84–48		McLeod Center (2,125); Cedar Falls, IA
11/04/2012*; 5:30 pm	Northern State	W 69–48		McLeod Center (3,232); Cedar Falls, IA
Regular season
11/10/2012*; 12:00 pm	Wartburg	W 103–50	1–0	McLeod Center (3,104); Cedar Falls, IA
11/14/2012*; 7:00 pm	Toledo	W 84–81 ^{OT}	2–0	McLeod Center (3,257); Cedar Falls, IA
11/17/2012*; 7:00 pm	North Dakota	W 72–47	3–0	McLeod Center (3,227); Cedar Falls, IA
11/22/2012*; 8:30 pm, NBCSN	vs. No. 2 Louisville; Battle 4 Atlantis Quarterfinals	L 46–51	3–1	Imperial Arena (3,126); Nassau, Bahamas
11/23/2012*; 2:30, AXS TV	vs. Stanford; Battle 4 Atlantis	L 50–66	3–2	Imperial Arena (1,462); Nassau, BAH
11/24/2012*; 12:00 pm, AXS TV	vs. No. 19 Memphis; Battle 4 Atlantis	L 47–52	3–3	Imperial Arena (1,113); Nassau, BAH
12/01/2012*; 7:00 pm, KWWL	Milwaukee	W 72–61	4–3	McLeod Center (4,121); Cedar Falls, IA
12/05/2012*; 7:00 pm	Northern Colorado	W 76–59	5–3	McLeod Center (3,366); Cedar Falls, IA
12/08/2012*; 5:00 pm, NBCSN	at George Mason	W 82–77 ^{OT}	6–3	Patriot Center (6,487); Fairfax, VA
12/15/2012*; 1:30 pm, BTN	vs. Iowa; Big Four Classic	L 73–80	6–4	Wells Fargo Arena (13,180); Des Moines, IA
12/19/2012*; 9:00 pm, TWCSN	at No. 21 UNLV; MWC–MVC Challenge	L 59–73	6–5	Thomas & Mack Center (14,484); Las Vegas, NV
12/23/2012*; 1:00 pm	Saint Mary's	W 82–75	7–5	McLeod Center (3,865); Cedar Falls, IA
12/30/2012; 5:00 pm, FSN	at Wichita State	L 41–66	7–6 (0–1)	Charles Koch Arena (10,506); Wichita, KS
01/02/2013; 7:00 pm, KWWL	Indiana State	L 61–65	7–7 (0–2)	McLeod Center (4,035); Cedar Falls, IA
01/05/2013; 7:00 pm	at Illinois State	W 70–60	8–7 (1–2)	Redbird Arena (6,951); Normal, IL
01/09/2013; 7:00 pm, KWWL	Evansville	L 59–62	8–8 (1–3)	McLeod Center (4,155); Cedar Falls, IA
01/12/2013; 1:00 pm, FSN	Bradley	W 84–53	9–8 (2–3)	McLeod Center (4,074); Cedar Falls, IA
01/15/2013; 7:00 pm, ESPN3	at No. 12 Creighton	L 68–79	9–9 (2–4)	CenturyLink Center (17,391); Omaha, NE
01/20/2013; 2:00 pm	Drake	W 85–55	10–9 (3–4)	McLeod Center (4,215); Cedar Falls, IA
01/23/2013; 7:00 pm, KWWL	Southern Illinois	W 58–45	11–9 (4–4)	McLeod Center (3,656); Cedar Falls, IA
01/26/2013; 12:00 pm	at Indiana State	L 58–59	11–10 (4–5)	Hulman Center (6,554); Terre Haute, IN
01/29/2013; 7:00 pm	at Evansville	L 51–54 ^{OT}	11–11 (4–6)	Fort Center (3,681); Evansville, IN
02/02/2013; 3:00 pm, ESPN2	No. 15 Wichita State	W 57–52	12–11 (5–6)	McLeod Center (6,023); Cedar Falls, IA
02/05/2013; 7:00 pm, ESPN3	Missouri State	W 48–37	13–11 (6–6)	McLeod Center (3,573); Cedar Falls, IA
02/10/2013; 2:00 pm, ESPN3	at Bradley	W 68–65	14–11 (7–6)	Carver Arena (7,205); Peoria, IL
02/13/2013; 7:00 pm, KWWL	Creighton	W 61–54	15–11 (8–6)	McLeod Center (6,970); Cedar Falls, IA
02/16/2013; 7:00 pm, Mediacom	at Drake	W 71–64	16–11 (9–6)	Knapp Center (6,711); Des Moines, IA
02/19/2013; 7:00 pm	at Missouri State	W 69–63	17–11 (10–6)	JQH Arena (5,704); Springfield, MO
02/23/2013*; 7:00 pm, ESPN3	Denver; Bracketbusters	L 57–63	17–12	McLeod Center (6,325); Cedar Falls, IA
02/27/2013; 7:00 pm, FSN	at Southern Illinois	L 57–63	17–13 (10–7)	SIU Arena (5,351); Carbondale, IL
03/02/2013; 7:00 pm	Illinois State	W 80–72	18–13 (11–7)	McLeod Center (6,621); Cedar Falls, IA
2013 Missouri Valley Conference tournament
03/08/2013; 8:30 pm, ESPN3	vs. Illinois State; Quarterfinals	L 65–73	18–14	Scottrade Center (14,004); St.Louis, MO
2013 CIT
03/20/2013*; 7:00 pm	North Dakota; First Round	W 77–66	19–14	McLeod Center (2,450); Cedar Falls, IA
03/23/2013*; 7:00 pm	UIC; Second Round	W 63–51	20–14	McLeod Center (3,025); Cedar Falls, IA
03/26/2013*; 7:00 pm	Bradley; Quarterfinals	W 90–77	21–14	McLeod Center (3,390); Cedar Falls, IA
03/30/2013*; 7:00 pm	Weber State; Semifinals	L 56–59	21–15	McLeod Center (5,033); Cedar Falls, IA
*Non-conference game. ^{#}Rankings from AP Poll. (#) Tournament seedings in parentheses. All times are in Central Time.
