= 2012–13 Indiana State Sycamores men's basketball team =

American college basketball season

2012–13 Indiana State Sycamores men's basketball

NIT, First Round
- Conference: Missouri Valley Conference
- Record: 18–15 (9–9 The Valley)
- Head coach: Greg Lansing (3rd season)
- Assistant coaches: Lou Gudino; Marcus Belcher; David Ragland
- Home arena: Hulman Center

2012–13 Missouri Valley Conference men's basketball standings
	Conf.				Overall
Team	W		L	PCT	W		L	PCT
No. 22 Creighton †	13	–	5	.722	28	–	8	.778
Wichita State	12	–	6	.667	30	–	9	.769
Northern Iowa	11	–	7	.611	21	–	15	.583
Evansville	10	–	8	.556	21	–	15	.583
Indiana State	9	–	9	.500	18	–	15	.545
Illinois State	8	–	10	.444	18	–	15	.545
Missouri State	7	–	11	.389	11	–	22	.333
Bradley	7	–	11	.389	18	–	17	.514
Drake	7	–	11	.389	15	–	17	.469
Southern Illinois	6	–	12	.333	14	–	17	.452
† 2013 MVC tournament winner As of April 6, 2013; Rankings from AP Poll

The 2012–13 Indiana State Sycamores basketball team represented Indiana State University during the 2012–13 NCAA Division I men's basketball season. The Sycamores, led by third year head coach Greg Lansing, played their home games at the Hulman Center and were members of the Missouri Valley Conference. They finished the season 18–15, 9–9 in MVC play to finish in fifth place. They advanced to the semifinals of the Missouri Valley tournament where they lost to Creighton. They were invited to the 2013 NIT where they lost in the first round to Iowa.

== Roster ==
Number	Name	Position	Height	Weight	Year	Hometown
0	Jake Kitchell	Forward	6–10	240	Sophomore	Union Mills, Indiana
2	Lucas Eitel	Guard	6–2	190	Junior	Marshall, Illinois
3	Manny Arop	Forward	6–6	215	Junior	Edmonton, Alberta
5	Justin Gant	Center	6–8	210	Sophomore	Terre Haute, Indiana
11	Devonte Brown	Guard	6–3	185	RS Freshman	Killeen, Texas
12	Dawon Cummings	Guard	6–4	175	Junior	Kansas City, Missouri
13	Jake Odum	Guard	6–4	170	Junior	Terre Haute, Indiana
20	Rhett Smith	Forward	6–7	240	Freshman	Sullivan, Indiana
22	Brandon Burnett	Guard	6–6	225	RS Freshman	Tucson, Arizona
30	Mike Samuels	Center	6–11	285	Junior	Bushkill, Pennsylvania
31	RJ Mahurin	Forward	6–8	210	Junior	Rockville, Indiana
32	Khristian Smith	Guard	6–6	210	Freshman	Indianapolis, Indiana
42	TJ Bell	Guard/Forward	6–8	240	Freshman	Charleston, Illinois

== Schedule ==
Date time, TV	Rank^{#}	Opponent^{#}	Result	Record	Site (attendance) city, state
Exhibition
11/01/2012*; 7:05 pm		Lewis	W 79–66		Hulman Center (3,625); Terre Haute, IN
Regular season
11/09/2012*; 11:00 pm, FSN		at No. 13 UCLA	L 59–86	0–1	Pauley Pavilion (13,513); Los Angeles, CA
11/13/2012*; 7:05 pm		Winthrop	W 66–55	1–1	Hulman Center (4,916); Terre Haute, IN
11/17/2012*; 1:05 pm		Truman State	W 70–57	2–1	Hulman Center (N/A); Terre Haute, IN
11/20/2012*; 7:00 pm		at Ball State	W 68–48	3–1	Worthen Arena (3,128); Muncie, IN
11/25/2012*; 1:05 pm		High Point	W 76–62	4–1	Hulman Center (5,487); Terre Haute, IN
12/01/2012*; 2:05 pm		No. 25 New Mexico; MWC–MVC Challenge	L 68–77 ^{OT}	4–2	Hulman Center (6,080); Terre Haute, IN
12/08/2012*; 2:00 pm		at Morehead State	L 63–71	4–3	Ellis Johnson Arena (2,038); Morehead, KY
12/15/2012*; 7:00 pm		at IUPUI	W 75–61	5–3	The Jungle (1,215); Indianapolis, IN
12/22/2012*; 4:00 pm, ESPNU		vs. Ole Miss; Diamond Head Classic Quarterfinals	W 87–85 ^{OT}	6–3	Stan Sheriff Center (6,691); Honolulu, HI
12/23/2012*; 5:30 pm, ESPNU		vs. No. 18 San Diego State; Diamond Head Classic Semifinals	L 55–62	6–4	Stan Sheriff Center (6,419); Honolulu, HI
12/25/2012*; 7:30 pm, ESPN2		vs. Miami (FL); Diamond Head Classic 3rd place game	W 57–55 ^{OT}	7–4	Stan Sheriff Center; Honolulu, HI
12/30/2012; 1:05 pm		Illinois State	W 77–75	8–4 (1–0)	Hulman Center (5,808); Terre Haute, IN
01/02/2013; 8:00 pm, ESPN3		at Northern Iowa	W 65–61	9–4 (2–0)	McLeod Center (4,035); Cedar Falls, IA
01/05/2013; 3:05 pm, ESPN3		at No. 16 Creighton	L 66–79	9–5 (2–1)	CenturyLink Center Omaha (17,694); Omaha, NE
01/09/2013; 7:05 pm		Bradley	W 68–53	10–5 (3–1)	Hulman Center (5,553); Terre Haute, IN
01/12/2013; 8:05 pm		at Southern Illinois	L 71–76	10–6 (3–2)	SIU Arena (5,315); Carbondale, IL
01/16/2013; 7:05 pm, ESPN3		Missouri State	W 68–60	11–6 (4–2)	Hulman Center (5,593); Terre Haute, IN
01/19/2013; 8:05 pm, FSN		Evansville	W 72–62	12–6 (5–2)	Hulman Center (6,444); Terre Haute, IN
01/23/2013; 8:05 pm		at Illinois State	L 58–60	12–7 (5–3)	Redbird Arena (5,519); Norman, IL
01/26/2013; 1:00 pm		Northern Iowa	W 59–58	13–7 (6–3)	Hulman Center (6,554); Terre Haute, IN
01/29/2013; 8:00 pm, ESPN3		at No. 15 Wichita State	W 68–55	14–7 (7–3)	Charles Koch Arena (10,216); Wichita, KS
02/02/2013; 7:30 pm, FSN		at Drake	L 71–74 ^{OT}	14–8 (7–4)	Knapp Center (4,439); Des Moines, IA
02/06/2013; 7:05 pm, ESPN3		No. 16 Creighton	W 76–57	15–8 (8–4)	Hulman Center (8,345); Terre Haute, IN
02/09/2013; 1:05 pm		Southern Illinois	W 66–65	16–8 (9–4)	Hulman Center (5,821); Terre Haute, IN
02/12/2013; 8:00 pm, FSN/ESPN3		at Missouri State	L 65–67	16–9 (9–5)	JQH Arena (5,255); Springfield, MO
02/16/2013; 2:00 pm		at Bradley	L 68–80	16–10 (9–6)	Carver Arena (8,443); Peoria, IL
02/19/2013; 7:00 pm, ESPN3		Wichita State	L 62–66	16–11 (9–7)	Hulman Center (6,169); Terre Haute, IN
02/23/2013*; 11:00 am, ESPNU		Iona; BracketBusters	W 65–64	17–11	Hulman Center (4,378); Terre Haute, IN
02/27/2013; 7:05 pm		Drake	L 56–67	17–12 (9–8)	Hulman Center (5,054); Terre Haute, IN
03/02/2013; 5:00 pm		at Evansville	L 68–84	17–13 (9–9)	Fort Center (6,909); Evansville, IN
2013 Missouri Valley Conference tournament
03/08/2013; 3:30 pm, FSN/ESPN3		vs. Evansville; Quarterfinals	W 51–50	18–13	Scottrade Center (14,567); St.Louis, MO
03/09/2013; 2:35 pm, FSN		vs. Creighton; Semifinals	L 43–64	18–14	Scottrade Center (18,262); St.Louis, MO
2013 NIT
03/20/2013*; 7:00 pm, ESPN2	No. (6)	at (3) Iowa; First Round	L 52–68	18–15	Carver-Hawkeye Arena (15,400); Iowa City, IA
*Non-conference game. ^{#}Rankings from AP Poll. (#) Tournament seedings in parentheses. All times are in Eastern Time. (#) during NIT is Seed within Region.
