= 2012–13 Bradley Braves men's basketball team =

American college basketball season

2012–13 Bradley Braves men's basketball

CIT, Quarterfinals
- Conference: Missouri Valley Conference
- Record: 18–17 (7–11 The Valley)
- Head coach: Geno Ford (2nd season)
- Assistant coaches: Ronald Coleman; Greg Graham; Jaden Uken
- Home arena: Carver Arena; Renaissance Coliseum

2012–13 Missouri Valley Conference men's basketball standings
	Conf.				Overall
Team	W		L	PCT	W		L	PCT
No. 22 Creighton †	13	–	5	.722	28	–	8	.778
Wichita State	12	–	6	.667	30	–	9	.769
Northern Iowa	11	–	7	.611	21	–	15	.583
Evansville	10	–	8	.556	21	–	15	.583
Indiana State	9	–	9	.500	18	–	15	.545
Illinois State	8	–	10	.444	18	–	15	.545
Missouri State	7	–	11	.389	11	–	22	.333
Bradley	7	–	11	.389	18	–	17	.514
Drake	7	–	11	.389	15	–	17	.469
Southern Illinois	6	–	12	.333	14	–	17	.452
† 2013 MVC tournament winner As of April 6, 2013; Rankings from AP Poll

The 2012–13 Bradley Braves men's basketball team represented Bradley University during the 2012–13 NCAA Division I men's basketball season. The Braves, led by second year head coach Geno Ford, played their home games at Carver Arena, with four home games at Renaissance Coliseum, and were members of the Missouri Valley Conference. They finished the season 18–17, 7–11 in Missouri Valley play to finish in a three-way tie for seventh place. They lost in the first round of the Missouri Valley tournament to Drake. They were invited to the 2013 CIT where they defeated Green Bay and Tulane to advance to the quarterfinals where they lost to fellow Missouri Valley member Northern Iowa.

== Roster ==
Number	Name	Position	Height	Weight	Year	Hometown
0	Ka'Darryl Bell	Guard	6–1	193	Freshman	Chicago, Illinois
3	Anthony Fields	Guard	6–1	158	Sophomore	Detroit, Michigan
4	Jake Eastman	Guard/Forward	6–5	207	Senior	Richmond, Virginia
5	Jalen Crawford	Guard	6–2	202	Sophomore	Detroit, Michigan
10	Mason Alwan	Guard	6–2	200	Junior	Peoria, Illinois
12	Darrion Harris	Guard	5–10	150	Freshman	St. Louis, Missouri
14	Milos Knezevic	Forward	6–8	223	Senior	Las Vegas, Nevada
20	Tyshon Pickett	Forward	6–6	220	Junior	Passaic, New Jersey
21	Will Egolf	Forward/Center	6–9	235	Senior	Juneau, Alaska
23	Shayok Shayok	Forward	6–8	228	Sophomore	Ottawa, Ontario
24	Omari Grier	Guard	6–4	178	Sophomore	Erial, New Jersey
25	Walt Lemon, Jr.	Guard	6–3	178	Junior	Chicago, Illinois
30	Jimmy Gavin	Guard	6–2	180	Sophomore	Arlington Heights, Illinois
32	Dyricus Simms-Edwards	Forward	6–3	197	Senior	Peoria, Illinois
44	Jordan Prosser	Center	6–9	240	Junior	Goodfield, Illinois
52	Nate Wells	Center	7–1	245	Freshman	Davenport, Iowa

== Schedule ==
Date time, TV	Opponent	Result	Record	Site (attendance) city, state
Exhibition
10/29/2012*; 7:00 pm	Upper Iowa	W 68–54		Renaissance Coliseum (1,054); Peoria, IL
11/03/2012*; 1:00 pm	Wisconsin–Parkside	W 70–42		Carver Arena (6,007); Peoria, IL
Regular season
11/09/2012*; 9:00 pm, Bradley TV	Eastern Illinois	W 76–53	1–0	Carver Arena (6,634); Peoria, IL
11/12/2012*; 7:00 pm, Bradley TV	Texas–Pan American	W 78–61	2–0	Renaissance Coliseum (3,151); Peoria, IL
11/17/2012*; 6:00 pm, CSN Chicago	at IUPUI	W 79–72	3–0	The Jungle (1,085); Indianapolis, IN
11/20/2012*; 6:30 pm	at South Florida	L 63–82	3–1	USF Sun Dome (4,768); Tampa, FL
11/24/2012*; 1:00 pm, Bradley TV	Tennessee–Martin	W 80–57	4–1	Carver Arena (6,649); Peoria, IL
11/28/2012*; 6:00 pm	at Central Michigan	W 82–65	5–1	McGuirk Arena (2,076); Mount Pleasant, MI
12/01/2012*; 3:00 pm, ESPNU	No. 3 Michigan	L 66–74	5–2	Carver Arena (11,019); Peoria, IL
12/04/2012*; 7:00 pm, Bradley TV	George Washington	W 72–68	6–2	Carver Arena (6,313); Peoria, IL
12/17/2012*; 7:00 pm, Bradley TV	Georgia Southern; Las Vegas Classic	W 62–43	7–2	Carver Arena (6,140); Peoria, IL
12/19/2012*; 7:00 pm, Bradley TV	Mississippi Valley State; Las Vegas Classic	W 77–42	8–2	Carver Arena (6,066); Peoria, IL
12/22/2012*; 7:00 pm	vs. Virginia Tech; Las Vegas Classic semifinals	L 65–66 ^{OT}	8–3	Orleans Arena (N/A); Paradise, NV
12/23/2012*; 8:00 pm, CBSSN	vs. Portland; Las Vegas Classic 3rd place game	L 55–57	8–4	Orleans Arena (N/A); Paradise, NV
12/29/2012; 7:00 pm, MC22/Bradley TV	Drake	W 67–57	9–4 (1–0)	Carver Arena (7,534); Peoria, IL
01/02/2013; 7:05 pm, WAOE/Bradley TV	at Southern Illinois	W 66–60	10–4 (2–0)	SIU Arena (5,015); Carbondale, IL
01/06/2013; 4:30 pm, ESPNU	Wichita State	L 63–69	10–5 (2–1)	Carver Arena (7,317); Peoria, IL
01/09/2013; 6:05 pm	at Indiana State	L 53–68	10–6 (2–2)	Hulman Center (5,553); Terre Haute, IN
01/12/2013; 1:00 pm, MVC-TV	at Northern Iowa	L 53–84	10–7 (2–3)	McLeod Center (4,074); Cedar Falls, IA
01/15/2013; 7:00 pm, CSN Chicago/Bradley TV	Southern Illinois	W 69–66	11–7 (3–3)	Carver Arena (6,628); Peoria, IL
01/19/2013; 1:00 pm, Bradley TV/ESPN3	Missouri State	W 69–66	12–7 (4–3)	Carver Arena (7,756); Peoria, IL
01/23/2013; 7:05 pm	at Evansville	L 56–66	12–8 (4–4)	Ford Center (4,183); Evansville, IN
01/26/2013; 7:00 pm, ESPN3	at No. 20 Wichita State	L 39–73	12–9 (4–5)	Charles Koch Arena (10,506); Wichita, KS
01/29/2013; 7:00 pm, MVC-TV	Illinois State	W 83–77	13–9 (5–5)	Carver Arena (9,088); Peoria, IL
02/02/2013; 2:05 pm, WAOE/ESPN3	at No. 21 Creighton	L 58–75	13–10 (5–6)	CenturyLink Center Omaha (18,111); Omaha, NE
02/05/2013; 7:00 pm, Bradley TV	Evansville	W 76–70	14–10 (6–6)	Carver Arena (6,653); Peoria, IL
02/10/2013; 2:00 pm, ESPN3	Northern Iowa	L 65–68	14–11 (6–7)	Carver Arena (7,205); Peoria, IL
02/13/2013; 7:00 pm	at Illinois State	L 59–79	14–12 (6–8)	Redbird Arena (8,417); Normal, IL
02/16/2013; 1:00 pm, Bradley TV	Indiana State	W 80–68	15–12 (7–8)	Carver Arena (8,443); Peoria, IL
02/20/2013; 7:05 pm, MC22	at Drake	L 84–92 ^{OT}	15–13 (7–9)	Knapp Center (3,825); Des Moines, IA
02/23/2013*; 3:00 pm, ESPN3	at UIC; BracketBusters	W 63–62	16–13	UIC Pavilion (3,831); Chicago, IL
02/27/2013; 7:00 pm, WAOE/Bradley TV	Creighton	L 62–80	16–14 (7–10)	Carver Arena (7,730); Peoria, IL
03/02/2013; 7:05 pm	at Missouri State	L 56–64	16–15 (7–11)	JQH Arena (7,099); Springfield, MO
2013 Missouri Valley Conference tournament
03/07/2013; 6:00 pm, MVC TV/ESPN3	vs. Drake; First Round	L 66–81	16–16	Scottrade Center (7,537); St.Louis, MO
2013 CIT
03/20/2013*; 7:00 pm	Green Bay; First Round	W 75–69	17–16	Renaissance Coliseum (1,801); Peoria, IL
03/23/2013*; 7:00 pm	Tulane; Second Round	W 77–72	18–16	Renaissance Coliseum (1,897); Peoria, IL
03/26/2013*; 7:00 pm	at Northern Iowa; Quarterfinals	L 77–90	18–17	McLeod Center (3,390); Cedar Falls, IA
*Non-conference game. ^{#}Rankings from AP Poll. (#) Tournament seedings in parentheses. All times are in Central Time.
