= 2012–13 Creighton Bluejays men's basketball team =

American college basketball season

2012–13 Creighton Bluejays men's basketball
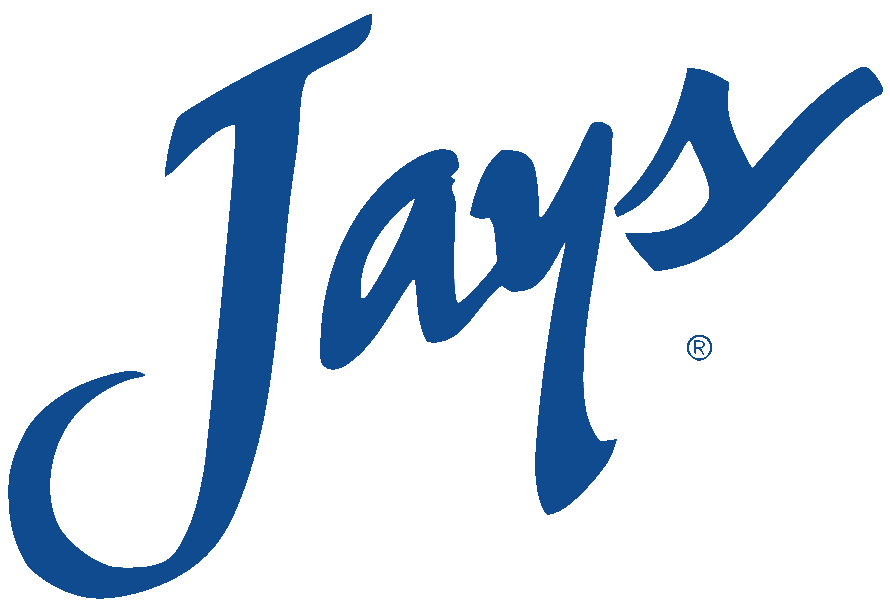

Missouri Valley tournament champions Missouri Valley Regular Season Champions Las Vegas Invitational Champions

NCAA Tournament, Round of 32
- Conference: Missouri Valley Conference

Ranking
- Coaches: No. 21
- AP: No. 22
- Record: 28–8 (13–5 MVC)
- Head coach: Greg McDermott (3rd year)
- Assistant coaches: Darian DeVries (15th year); Steve Lutz (3rd year); Steve Merfeld (3rd year)
- Home arena: CenturyLink Center Omaha

2012–13 Missouri Valley Conference men's basketball standings
	Conf.				Overall
Team	W		L	PCT	W		L	PCT
No. 22 Creighton †	13	–	5	.722	28	–	8	.778
Wichita State	12	–	6	.667	30	–	9	.769
Northern Iowa	11	–	7	.611	21	–	15	.583
Evansville	10	–	8	.556	21	–	15	.583
Indiana State	9	–	9	.500	18	–	15	.545
Illinois State	8	–	10	.444	18	–	15	.545
Missouri State	7	–	11	.389	11	–	22	.333
Bradley	7	–	11	.389	18	–	17	.514
Drake	7	–	11	.389	15	–	17	.469
Southern Illinois	6	–	12	.333	14	–	17	.452
† 2013 MVC tournament winner As of April 6, 2013; Rankings from AP Poll

The 2012–13 Creighton Bluejays men's basketball team represented Creighton University during the 2012–13 NCAA Division I men's basketball season. The Bluejays, led by third year head coach Greg McDermott, played their home games at the CenturyLink Center Omaha and were in their final season as members of the Missouri Valley Conference. They finished the season 28–8, 13–5 in MVC play to be Missouri Valley regular season champions. They were also champions of the Missouri Valley tournament, defeating Wichita State in the championship game, to earn an automatic bid to the 2013 NCAA tournament. In the tournament, they defeated Cincinnati in the second round before losing in the third round to Duke.

Following the season, Creighton left the MVC to join the Big East Conference.

== Roster ==
2012–13 Creighton Bluejays men's basketball team
Players
Coaches

Pos.	#	Name	Height	Weight	Year	Previous school	Hometown
C	00	Gregory Echenique	6 ft 9 in (2.06 m)	260 lb (118 kg)	RS Sr	St. Benedict's	Guatire, Venezuela
G	1	Austin Chatman	6 ft 0 in (1.83 m)	185 lb (84 kg)	So	The Colony	The Colony, Texas
G	2	Taylor Stormberg	6 ft 0 in (1.83 m)	190 lb (86 kg)	Jr	Creighton Prep	Omaha, Nebraska
F	3	Doug McDermott	6 ft 8 in (2.03 m)	225 lb (102 kg)	Jr	Ames	Ames, Iowa
G	5	Josh Jones	6 ft 2 in (1.88 m)	200 lb (91 kg)	Sr	Central	Omaha, Nebraska
G	10	Grant Gibbs	6 ft 5 in (1.96 m)	210 lb (95 kg)	Sr	Linn-Mar; Gonzaga	Marion, Iowa
G	11	Andre Yates	6 ft 0 in (1.83 m)	185 lb (84 kg)	Fr	Dunbar	Dayton, Ohio
G	12	Jahenns Manigat	6 ft 1 in (1.85 m)	175 lb (79 kg)	Jr	Elite Academy	Ottawa, Ontario, Canada
G	21	Isaiah Zierden	6 ft 2 in (1.88 m)	175 lb (79 kg)	Fr	Benilde-St. Margaret's	St. Louis Park, Minnesota
G	22	Avery Dingman	6 ft 6 in (1.98 m)	205 lb (93 kg)	So	Branson	Branson, Missouri
C	23	Geoffrey Groselle	7 ft 0 in (2.13 m)	250 lb (113 kg)	Fr	Plano West	Plano, Texas
F	24	Nevin Johnson	6 ft 5 in (1.96 m)	200 lb (91 kg)	Fr	Spring	Houston, Texas
G	30	Joe Kelling	6 ft 0 in (1.83 m)	185 lb (84 kg)	Sr	St. James Academy	Kansas City, Kansas
C	31	Will Artino	6 ft 11 in (2.11 m)	230 lb (104 kg)	So	Waukee	Waukee, Iowa
F	34	Ethan Wragge	6 ft 7 in (2.01 m)	225 lb (102 kg)	Jr	Eden Prairie	Eden Prairie, Minnesota
F	40	Alex Olsen	6 ft 6 in (1.98 m)	190 lb (86 kg)	Fr	Lincoln	Council Bluffs, Iowa
F	50	Mogboluwaga Oginni	6 ft 8 in (2.03 m)	220 lb (100 kg)	Fr	Saint Louis University HS	St. Louis, Missouri

Head coach

- Greg McDermott (Northern Iowa)

Assistant coach(es)

- Darian DeVries (Northern Iowa)
- Steve Lutz (Texas Lutheran)
- Steve Merfeld (UW–La Crosse)

Legend

- (C) Team captain
- (S) Suspended
- (I) Ineligible
- (W) Walk-on
- Injured
- Current redshirt

Roster
Last update: 2012-10-11

== Rankings ==
Ranking movement Legend: ██ Improvement in ranking. ██ Decrease in ranking. RV=Others receiving votes.
Poll	Pre	Wk 1	Wk 2	Wk 3	Wk 4	Wk 5	Wk 6	Wk 7	Wk 8	Wk 9	Wk 10	Wk 11	Wk 12	Wk 13	Wk 14	Wk 15	Wk 16	Wk 17	Wk 18	Final
AP	#16	#15	#14	#11	#16	#16	#17	#16	#16	#13	#12	#17	#21	#16	RV	RV		RV	#23	#22
Coaches	#15	#13	#12	#11	#13	#13	#13	#12	#11	#11	#10	#12	#17	#13	#23	RV	RV	RV	#24	#21

== Schedule and results ==
Date time, TV	Rank^{#}	Opponent^{#}	Result	Record	High points	High rebounds	High assists	Site (attendance) city, state
Exhibition
11/02/2012*; 7:05 pm	No. 16	Mary	W 89–51		— – —	— – —	— – —	CenturyLink Center Omaha (15,436); Omaha, NE
Regular season
11/09/2012*; 7:05 pm	No. 16	North Texas	W 71–51	1–0	21 – McDermott	11 – McDermott	4 – Gibbs	CenturyLink Center Omaha (17,139); Omaha, NE
11/14/2012*; 7:05 pm, ESPN3	No. 15	UAB	W 77–60	2–0	18 – Josh Jones	16 – Echenique	6 – Gibbs & Chatman	CenturyLink Center Omaha (15,755); Omaha, NE
11/18/2012*; 7:05 pm	No. 15	Presbyterian; Las Vegas Invitational	W 87–58	3–0	24 – McDermott	8 – Echenique	11 – Chatman	CenturyLink Center Omaha (16,801); Omaha, NE
11/20/2012*; 7:05 pm, ESPN3	No. 14	Longwood; Las Vegas Invitational	W 105–57	4–0	17 – McDermott & Echenique	7 – Chatman	6 – Gibbs	CenturyLink Center Omaha (15,826); Omaha, NE
11/23/2012*; 9:00 pm, ESPN2	No. 14	vs. Wisconsin; Las Vegas Invitational semifinals	W 84–74	5–0	30 – McDermott	8 – McDermott & Echenique	7 – Gibbs	Orleans Arena (N/A); Las Vegas, NV
11/24/2012*; 10:00 pm, ESPN2	No. 14	vs. Arizona State; Las Vegas Invitational	W 87–73	6–0	29 – McDermott	9 – McDermott	7 – Gibbs	Orleans Arena (N/A); Las Vegas, NV
11/28/2012*; 7:05 pm, ESPN3	No. 11	Boise State; MWC–MVC Challenge	L 70–83	6–1	21 – McDermott	4 – McDermott	5 – Gibbs & Chatman	CenturyLink Center Omaha (16,364); Omaha, NE
12/01/2012*; 2:00 pm, ESPN3	No. 11	Saint Joseph's	W 80–51	7–1	23 – McDermott	6 – McDermott, Echenique & Wragge	9 – Gibbs	CenturyLink Center Omaha (17,390); Omaha, NE
12/06/2012*; 7:00 pm, ESPN3	No. 16	at Nebraska; Rivalry	W 64–42	8–1	27 – McDermott	12 – Echenique	10 – Gibbs	Bob Devaney Sports Center (13,368); Lincoln, NE
12/09/2012*; 1:05 pm, ESPN3	No. 16	Akron	W 77–61	9–1	30 – McDermott	7 – Echenique	8 – Gibbs	CenturyLink Center Omaha (16,310); Omaha, NE
12/15/2012*; 10:00 pm, P12N	No. 16	at California	W 74–64	10–1	34 – McDermott	11 – Echenique	6 – Manigat	Haas Pavilion (8,116); Berkeley, CA
12/19/2012*; 7:05 pm, ESPN3	No. 17	Tulsa	W 71–54	11–1	21 – Dingman	8 – Echenique	6 – Gibbs	CenturyLink Center Omaha (15,102); Omaha, NE
12/29/2012; 7:05 pm, KMTV/ESPN3	No. 16	Evansville	W 87–70	12–1 (1–0)	29 – McDermott	13 – Echenique	8 – Chatman	CenturyLink Center Omaha (18,458); Omaha, NE
01/02/2013; 7:00 pm, FSN	No. 16	at Illinois State	W 79–72	13–1 (2–0)	18 – Wragge	9 – McDermott	7 – Gibbs	Redbird Arena (8,813); Normal, IL
01/05/2013; 2:05 pm, KMTV/ESPN3	No. 16	Indiana State	W 79–66	14–1 (3–0)	25 – McDermott	9 – McDermott & Echenique	9 – Chatman	CenturyLink Center Omaha (17,694); Omaha, NE
01/08/2013; 7:05 pm, KMTV/ESPN3	No. 13	Drake	W 91–61	15–1 (4–0)	22 – Wragge	7 – McDermott	9 – Chatman	CenturyLink Center Omaha (18,073); Omaha, NE
01/11/2013; 7:05 pm, KMTV/ESPN3	No. 13	at Missouri State	W 74–52	16–1 (5–0)	39 – McDermott	10 – McDermott	4 – Chatman	JQH Arena (7,895); Springfield, MO
01/15/2013; 7:00 pm, ESPN3	No. 12	Northern Iowa	W 79–68	17–1 (6–0)	31 – McDermott	6 – Gibbs	7 – Gibbs	CenturyLink Center Omaha (17,391); Omaha, NE
01/19/2013; 3:00 pm, ESPN2	No. 12	at Wichita State	L 64–67	17–2 (6–1)	25 – McDermott	13 – Echenique	8 – Gibbs	Charles Koch Arena (10,506); Wichita, KS
01/23/2013; 7:05 pm, FSN	No. 17	at Drake	L 69–74	17–3 (6–2)	19 – McDermott	6 – McDermott & Echenique	8 – Gibbs	Knapp Center (6,162); Des Moines, IA
01/27/2013; 7:00 pm, ESPNU	No. 17	at Southern Illinois	W 81–51	18–3 (7–2)	21 – McDermott	11 – Echenique	6 – Gibbs, Chatman	SIU Arena (5,764); Carbondale, IL
01/30/2013; 7:00 pm, FSN	No. 21	Missouri State	W 91–77	19–3 (8–2)	29 – McDermott	10 – McDermott	10 – Chatman	CenturyLink Center Omaha (16,811); Omaha, NE
02/02/2013; 2:05 pm, KMTV/ESPN3	No. 21	Bradley	W 75–58	20–3 (9–2)	25 – McDermott	7 – McDermott	6 – Gibbs, Manigat	CenturyLink Center Omaha (18,111); Omaha, NE
02/06/2013; 6:05 pm, ESPN3	No. 16	at Indiana State	L 57–76	20–4 (9–3)	13 – Artino	7 – Echenique	6 – Gibbs	Hulman Center (8,345); Terre Haute, IN
02/09/2013; 9:00 pm, ESPN2	No. 16	Illinois State	L 72–75	20–5 (9–4)	24 – McDermott	13 – McDermott	3 – McDermott, Gibbs, Manigat	CenturyLink Center Omaha (18,494); Omaha, NE
02/13/2013; 7:00 pm		at Northern Iowa	L 54–61	20–6 (9–5)	15 – McDermott	12 – McDermott	5 – Gibbs	McLeod Center (6,970); Cedar Falls, IA
02/16/2013; 2:00 pm, ESPNU		at Evansville	W 71–68	21–6 (10–5)	21 – McDermott	10 – McDermott	6 – Gibbs	Ford Center (6,838); Evansville, IN
02/19/2013; 7:05 pm, ESPN3		Southern Illinois	W 59–45	22–6 (11–5)	13 – Gibbs, Artino	7 – McDermott	5 – Gibbs	CenturyLink Center Omaha (17,311); Omaha, NE
02/23/2013*; 5:00 pm, ESPN		at Saint Mary's; BracketBusters	L 66–74	22–7	22 – McDermott	5 – Echenique, Gibbs	7 – Gibbs	McKeon Pavilion (3,500); Moraga, CA
02/27/2013; 7:00 pm		at Bradley	W 80–62	23–7 (12–5)	32 – McDermott	11 – McDermott	8 – Gibbs	Carver Arena (7,730); Peoria, IL
03/02/2013; 1:00 pm, ESPN2		Wichita State	W 91–80	24–7 (13–5)	41 – McDermott	6 – McDermott	8 – Gibbs	CenturyLink Center Omaha (18,613); Omaha, NE
2013 Missouri Valley Conference Men's Basketball tournament
03/08/2013; 12:05 pm, MVC TV/ESPN3	(1)	vs. (9) Drake; Quarterfinals	W 65–53	25–7	23 – McDermott	11 – Echenique	8 – Gibbs	Scottrade Center (14,567); St. Louis, MO
03/09/2013; 1:35 pm, MVC TV	(1)	vs. (5) Indiana State; Semifinals	W 64–43	26–7	25 – McDermott	9 – McDermott	5 – Gibbs	Scottrade Center (18,262); St. Louis, MO
03/10/2013; 1:05 pm, CBS	(1)	vs. (2) Wichita State; Championship	W 68–65	27–7	16 – Manigat	11 – Echenique	7 – Chatman, Gibbs	Scottrade Center (16,659); St. Louis, MO
2013 NCAA tournament
03/22/2013*; 2:00 pm, CBS	(7 MW) No. 22	vs. (10 MW) Cincinnati; Second Round	W 67–63	28–7	27 – McDermott	11 – McDermott	7 – Manigat	Wells Fargo Center (20,125); Philadelphia, PA
03/24/2013*; 8:47 pm, TBS	(7 MW) No. 22	vs. (2 MW) No. 6 Duke; Third Round	L 50–66	28–8	21 – McDermott	9 – McDermott	4 – Gibbs	Wells Fargo Center (20,125); Philadelphia, PA
*Non-conference game. ^{#}Rankings from AP Poll. (#) Tournament seedings in parentheses. All times are in Central Time. (#) during NCAA Tournament is seed with Region MW=Midwest.
