= 2012–13 Wichita State Shockers men's basketball team =

American college basketball season

2012–13 Wichita State Shockers men's basketball

Cancún Challenge Champions

NCAA tournament, Final Four
- Conference: Missouri Valley Conference

Ranking
- Coaches: No. 4
- Record: 30–9 (12–6 MVC)
- Head coach: Gregg Marshall
- Assistant coaches: Chris Jans; Greg Heiar; K. T. Turner
- Home arena: Charles Koch Arena (10,506)

2012–13 Missouri Valley Conference men's basketball standings
	Conf.				Overall
Team	W		L	PCT	W		L	PCT
No. 22 Creighton †	13	–	5	.722	28	–	8	.778
Wichita State	12	–	6	.667	30	–	9	.769
Northern Iowa	11	–	7	.611	21	–	15	.583
Evansville	10	–	8	.556	21	–	15	.583
Indiana State	9	–	9	.500	18	–	15	.545
Illinois State	8	–	10	.444	18	–	15	.545
Missouri State	7	–	11	.389	11	–	22	.333
Bradley	7	–	11	.389	18	–	17	.514
Drake	7	–	11	.389	15	–	17	.469
Southern Illinois	6	–	12	.333	14	–	17	.452
† 2013 MVC tournament winner As of April 6, 2013; Rankings from AP Poll

The 2012–13 Wichita State Shockers men's basketball team represented Wichita State University in the 2012–13 NCAA Division I men's basketball season. They played their home games at the Charles Koch Arena, which has a capacity of 10,506. They played one home game at Intrust Bank Arena. They were in their 68th season as a member of the Missouri Valley Conference and 107th season overall. They were led by sixth-year head coach Gregg Marshall. They finished the season 30–9, 12–6 in Missouri Valley play to finish in second place. They advanced to the championship game of the Missouri Valley tournament where they lost to Creighton. They received an at-large bid to the 2013 NCAA tournament. They received a 9 seed in the West Region, where they defeated 8 seed Pittsburgh and 1 seed Gonzaga to advance to the Sweet Sixteen. In the West Region semifinals they defeated 13 seed La Salle and 2 seed Ohio State in the regional finals to be crowned West Region Champions and advance to the Final Four for the second time in school history and first time since 1965. In the Final Four they lost to Louisville.

== Roster ==
2012–13 Wichita State Shockers men's basketball team
Players
Coaches

Pos.	#	Name	Height	Weight	Year	Previous school	Hometown
F	0	Chadrack Lufile	6 ft 9 in (2.06 m)	255 lb (116 kg)	Jr	Assumption; Coffeyville CC	Burlington, Ontario, Canada
F	1	Derail Green	6 ft 7 in (2.01 m)	190 lb (86 kg)	Fr	Klein Forest	Houston, TX
G	2	Malcolm Armstead	6 ft 0 in (1.83 m)	205 lb (93 kg)	RS Sr	Central Park Christian; Chipola JC/Oregon	Florence, AL
G	3	Evan Wessel	6 ft 5 in (1.96 m)	203 lb (92 kg)	So	Wichita Heights	Wichita, KS
G	5	Demetric Williams	6 ft 2 in (1.88 m)	177 lb (80 kg)	Sr	Cheyenne	Las Vegas, NV
F	11	Cleanthony Early	6 ft 8 in (2.03 m)	220 lb (100 kg)	Jr	Pine Bush; Sullivan CC	Middletown, NY
G	14	Joe Mitchell	6 ft 1 in (1.85 m)	193 lb (88 kg)	Jr	Wichita Southeast; Hutchinson CC	Wichita, KS
G	15	Nick Wiggins	6 ft 6 in (1.98 m)	181 lb (82 kg)	Jr	Godby; Wabash Valley	Toronto, Ontario, Canada
C	20	Kadeem Coleby	6 ft 9 in (2.06 m)	250 lb (113 kg)	Sr	Christian Life Center; Daytona College	Nassau, Bahamas
C	21	Ehimen Orukpe	7 ft 0 in (2.13 m)	251 lb (114 kg)	Sr	Lifeline Educational Center; Three Rivers CC	Lagos, Nigeria
F	22	Carl Hall	6 ft 8 in (2.03 m)	233 lb (106 kg)	Sr	Bleckley County High School; NW Florida State	Cochran, GA
G	23	Fred VanVleet	5 ft 11 in (1.8 m)	175 lb (79 kg)	Fr	Auburn	Rockford, IL
G	31	Ron Baker	6 ft 3 in (1.91 m)	209 lb (95 kg)	RS Fr	Scott City	Scott City, KS
G	32	Tekele Cotton	6 ft 2 in (1.88 m)	203 lb (92 kg)	So	Whitefield Academy	Smyrna, GA
F	33	Zach Bush	6 ft 6 in (1.98 m)	175 lb (79 kg)	Fr	Eisenhower	Wichita, KS
F	50	Jake White	6 ft 8 in (2.03 m)	218 lb (99 kg)	So	Chaska	Chaska, MN

Head coach

- Gregg Marshall (Randolph–Macon)

Assistant coach(es)

- Greg Heiar (Franciscan)
- Chris Jans (Loras)
- K.T. Turner (Oklahoma City)

Legend

- (C) Team captain
- (S) Suspended
- (I) Ineligible
- (W) Walk-on
- Injured
- Current redshirt

Roster

== Schedule ==
Date time, TV	Rank^{#}	Opponent^{#}	Result	Record	High points	High rebounds	High assists	Site (attendance) city, state
Exhibition
11/05/2012*; 7:05 pm		Pittsburg State	W 100–56		23 – Early	8 – Early	5 – Armstead	Charles Koch Arena (9,810); Wichita, KS
Regular Season
11/10/2012*; 7:05 pm		NC Central	W 71–57	1–0	18 – Baker	13 – Hall	6 – Armstead	Charles Koch Arena (10,491); Wichita, KS
11/13/2012*; 6:00 pm, ESPNU		at VCU	W 53–51	2–0	13 – Early	11 – Hall	6 – Armstead	Stuart C. Siegel Center (7,693); Richmond, VA
11/15/2012*; 7:00 pm		Western Carolina; Cancún Challenge	W 79–63	3–0	21 – Early	8 – Early	3 – Armstead, Baker	Charles Koch Arena (10,186); Wichita, KS
11/17/2012*; 2:00 pm		Howard; Cancún Challenge	W 69–50	4–0	11 – Hall, Williams	6 – Hall, Williams	4 – Williams	Charles Koch Arena (10,183); Wichita, KS
11/20/2012*; 6:00 pm, CBSSN		vs. DePaul; Cancún Challenge Semifinals	W 75–62	5–0	18 – Williams	9 – Early	3 – Armstead	Moon Palace Golf and Spa Resort (902); Cancun, Mexico
11/21/2012*; 8:30 pm, CBSSN		vs. Iowa; Cancún Challenge Championship	W 75–63	6–0	25 – Early	9 – Early	5 – Armstead	Moon Palace Golf and Spa Resort (902); Cancun, Mexico
11/28/2012*; 7:05 pm		Tulsa	W 86–60	7–0	16 – Hall	11 – Hall	5 – Baker, Van Vleet	Charles Koch Arena (10,389); Wichita, KS
12/02/2012*; 4:00 pm		at Air Force	W 72–69	8–0	21 – Hall	10 – Hall	6 – Wessel	Clune Arena (1,793); Colorado Springs, CO
12/08/2012*; 7:05 pm	No. 24	Northern Colorado	W 80–54	9–0	16 – Early	10 – Lufile	5 – Van Vleet	Charles Koch Arena (10,307); Wichita, KS
12/13/2012*; 6:00 pm, FS South	No. 23	at Tennessee	L 60–69	9–1	21 – Hall	9 – Hall	4 – Cotton	Thompson–Boling Arena (15,215); Knoxville, TN
12/20/2012*; 7:00 pm, ESPN3		Charleston Southern	W 65–53	10–1	20 – Early	12 – Lufile	3 – Armstead	Charles Koch Arena (10,112); Wichita, KS
12/22/2012*; 7:00 pm		Southern Miss	W 59–51	11–1	17 – Williams	8 – Wiggins	3 – Armstead	Intrust Bank Arena (9,619); Wichita, KS
12/30/2012; 5:00 pm, MVC-TV/ESPN3		Northern Iowa	W 66–41	12–1 (1–0)	16 – Early	8 – White	5 – Armstead	Charles Koch Arena (10,506); Wichita, KS
01/02/2013; 7:05 pm, ESPN3		at Drake	W 75–63	13–1 (2–0)	18 – Wiggins	7 – Cotton	6 – Williams	Knapp Center (2,792); Des Moines, IA
01/06/2013; 4:30 pm, ESPNU		at Bradley	W 69–63	14–1 (3–0)	24 – Early	9 – Orukpe	3 – Williams, Armstead	Carver Arena (7,317); Peoria, IL
01/09/2013; 7:00 pm, ESPN3	No. 23	Southern Illinois	W 82–76	15–1 (4–0)	39 – Early	9 – Orukpe	9 – Armstead	Charles Koch Arena (10,306); Wichita, KS
01/13/2013; 3:35 pm, ESPN3	No. 23	at Evansville	L 67–71	15–2 (4–1)	21 – Armstead	10 – White	5 – Williams	Ford Center (5,485); Evansville, IN
01/16/2013; 7:00 pm, ESPN3		Illinois State	W 74–62	16–2 (5–1)	16 – Early	10 – Hall	7 – Cotton	Charles Koch Arena (10,323); Wichita, KS
01/19/2013; 3:00 pm, ESPN2		No. 12 Creighton	W 67–64	17–2 (6–1)	17 – Hall	13 – Hall	5 – Armstead	Charles Koch Arena (10,506); Wichita, KS
01/23/2013; 7:05 pm, ESPN3	No. 20	at Missouri State	W 62–52	18–2 (7–1)	17 – Early	11 – Early	2 – Armstead, Cotton, Early, Williams	JQH Arena (6,448); Springfield, MO
01/26/2013; 7:00 pm, ESPN3	No. 20	Bradley	W 73–39	19–2 (8–1)	12 – Wiggins	9 – White	8 – Armstead	Charles Koch Arena (10,506); Wichita, KS
01/29/2013; 7:00 pm, ESPN3	No. 15	Indiana State	L 55–68	19–3 (8–2)	15 – Early	11 – Early	4 – Armstead	Charles Koch Arena (10,216); Wichita, KS
02/02/2013; 3:00 pm, ESPN2	No. 15	at Northern Iowa	L 52–57	19–4 (8–3)	20 – Hall	6 – Early, Cotton	3 – Armstead	McLeod Center (6,023); Cedar Falls, IA
02/05/2013; 7:00 pm, ESPN3		at Southern Illinois	L 62–64	19–5 (8–4)	15 – Williams	7 – Williams	6 – Armstead	SIU Arena (4,852); Carbondale, IL
02/09/2013; 6:30 pm, MVC-TV/ESPN3		Missouri State	W 79–50	20–5 (9–4)	16 – Early	10 – Orkupe	5 – Armstead	Charles Koch Arena (10,506); Wichita, KS
02/13/2013; 7:00 pm, ESPN3		Drake	W 71–56	21–5 (10–4)	17 – van Vleet	10 – Hall	9 – van Vleet	Charles Koch Arena (10,211); Wichita, KS
02/17/2013; 7:00 pm, ESPNU		at Illinois State	W 68–67	22–5 (11–4)	18 – Armstead	7 – Williams	6 – Armstead	Redbird Arena (8,668); Normal, IL
02/19/2013; 6:00 pm, ESPN3		at Indiana State	W 66–62	23–5 (12–4)	19 – Early	7 – Williams	3 – Armstead	Hulman Center (6,169); Terre Haute, IN
02/23/2013*; 3:00 pm, ESPN2		Detroit; ESPN BracketBusters	W 94–79	24–5	20 – Armstead	7 – Hall, Early	6 – Armstead	Charles Koch Arena (10,425); Wichita, KS
02/27/2013; 7:00 pm		Evansville	L 56–59	24–6 (12–5)	12 – Cotton	9 – Cotton	4 – van Vleet	Charles Koch Arena (10,506); Wichita, KS
03/02/2013; 1:00 pm, ESPN2		at Creighton	L 80–91	24–7 (12–6)	18 – Williams	6 – Hall	6 – Williams	CenturyLink Center (18,613); Omaha, NE
2013 Missouri Valley Tournament
03/08/2013; 6:05 pm, ESPN3	(2)	vs. (7) Missouri State; Quarterfinals	W 69–59	25–7	18 – Hall	12 – Hall	5 – Armstead	Scottrade Center (14,004); St. Louis, MO
03/09/2013; 4:05 pm, ESPN3	(2)	vs. (6) Illinois State; Semifinals	W 66–51	26–7	16 – Hall	9 – Armstead	3 – Armstead, Williams	Scottrade Center (18,262); St. Louis, MO
03/10/2013; 1:05 pm, CBS	(2)	vs. (1) Creighton; Championship	L 65–68	26–8	28 – Armstead	9 – Armstead	3 – Armstead	Scottrade Center (16,659); St. Louis, MO
2013 NCAA Tournament
03/21/2013*; 12:40 pm, TBS	(9 W)	vs. (8 W) No. 20 Pittsburgh; Second Round	W 73–55	27–8	22 – Armstead	7 – Early	5 – Armstead	EnergySolutions Arena (18,044); Salt Lake City, UT
03/23/2013*; 7:40 pm, TNT	(9 W)	vs. (1 W) No. 1 Gonzaga; Third Round	W 76–70	28–8	16 – Baker, Early	7 – Early	4 – Baker	EnergySolutions Arena (16,060); Salt Lake City, UT
03/28/2013*; 9:34 pm, TBS	(9 W)	vs. (13 W) La Salle; Sweet Sixteen	W 72–58	29–8	18 – Armstead	9 – Orukpe	4 – Armstead	Staples Center (18,232); Los Angeles, CA
03/30/2013*; 6:10 pm, CBS	(9 W)	vs. (2 W) No. 7 Ohio State; Elite Eight	W 70–66	30–8	14 – Armstead	7 – Armstead, Early	3 – Armstead	Staples Center (17,998); Los Angeles, CA
04/06/2013*; 5:09 pm, CBS	(9 W)	vs. (1 MW) No. 2 Louisville; Final Four	L 68–72	30–9	24 – Early	10 – Early	7 – Armstead	Georgia Dome (75,350); Atlanta, GA
*Non-conference game. ^{#}Rankings from AP Poll. (#) Tournament seedings in parentheses. All times are in Central Time (#) during NCAA Tournament is Seed with Region W=West MW=Midwest.
