= Anthony Ireland (basketball) =

American basketball player (born 1991)

Personal information
- Born: September 25, 1991 (age 35) Waterbury, Connecticut, U.S.
- Listed height: 5 ft 9.25 in (1.76 m)
- Listed weight: 173.8 lb (79 kg)

Career information
- High school: Crosby High School (Waterbury, Connecticut)
- College: Loyola Marymount (2010–2014)
- NBA draft: 2014: undrafted
- Playing career: 2014–2022
- Position: Point guard

Career history
- 2014–2015: Élan Chalon
- 2015–2016: Arkadikos
- 2016–2017: Trefl Sopot
- 2017–2018: Juventus Utena
- 2018–2019: Avtodor Saratov
- 2019–2020: Benfica
- 2021: Egis Körmend
- 2021–2022: HydroTruck Radom

Career highlights
- 3× First-team All-WCC (2012–2014)

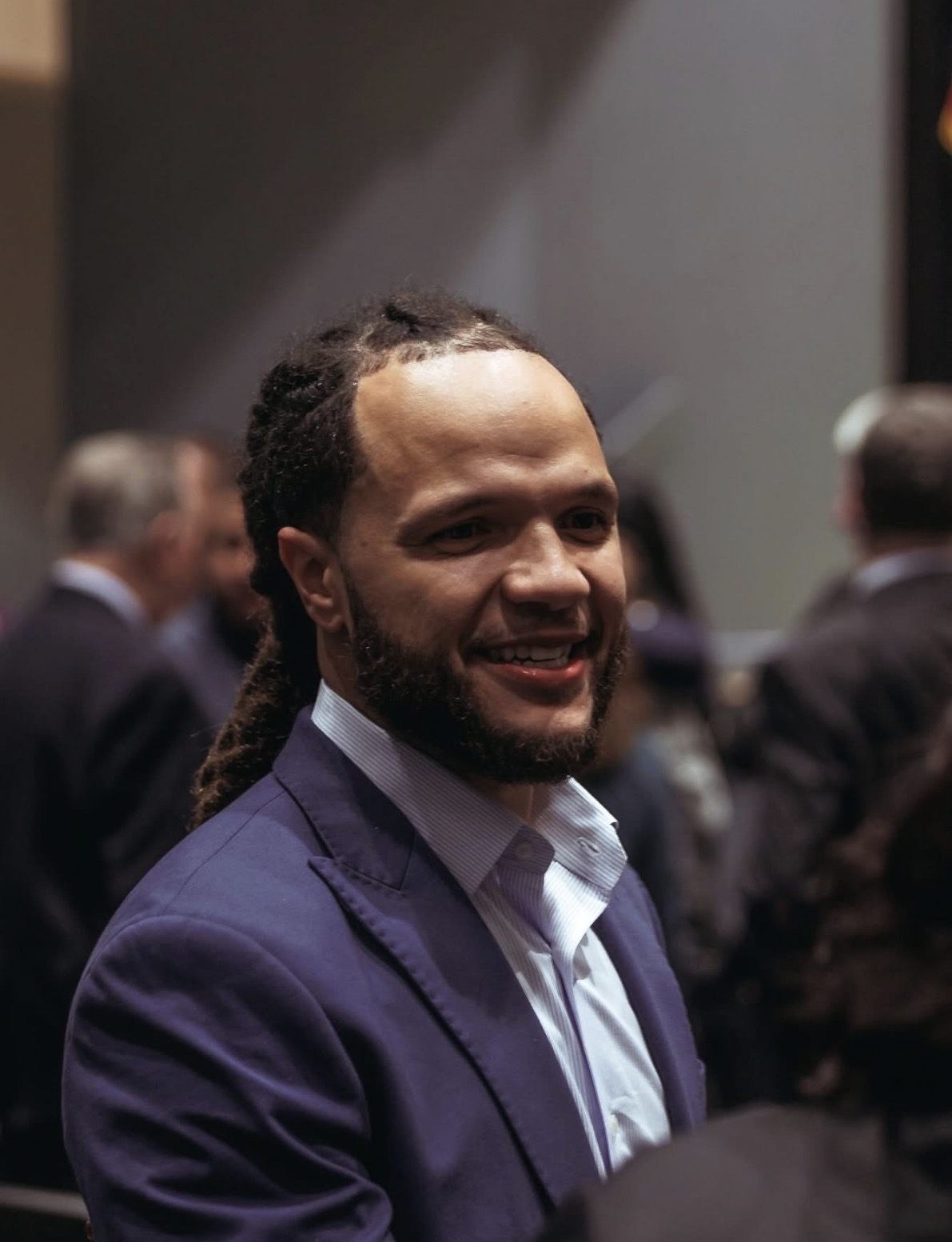
Anthony Ireland - Waterbury, CT, Basketball star, Board of Education commissioner, President & CEO of Greater Waterbury YMCA.

Anthony Ireland (born September 25, 1991) is an American former professional basketball player, Waterbury Public Schools Board of Education Commissioner, and President & CEO of the Greater Waterbury YMCA.A native of Waterbury, Connecticut, Ireland notably played collegiate basketball at Loyola Marymount University in Los Angeles, CA from 2010 to 2014 before embarking a professional career spanning across Europe. Ireland now serves as a member of the Waterbury Board of Education on the Building & School facilities committee, Finance committee, & as Chair of the School Personnel committee.

== College career ==
=== Loyola Marymount University (2010–14) ===
Ireland was a four-year standout for the Loyola Marymount Lions Men's Basketball program from 2010 to 2014 under the tutelage of Head Coach Max Good. He earned First Team All-WCC honors three times from 2012 to 2014. Ireland is considered one of the best players in school history, and was described by Coach Good and Los Angeles Times journalist Bill Dwyre as a tough, fearless player who used ball screens effectively, had deep 3-point range, and drove aggressively to the basket despite his small stature.

During Ireland's sophomore season, the Lions recorded one of their winningest seasons in school history, posting a 21–13 record, 11–5 in WCC play. The Lions earned a postseason berth in the 2012 CollegeInsider.com Postseason Tournament, where they fell to Utah State in the quarterfinals. Ireland earned his first of three consecutive First Team All-WCC accolades.

Ireland averaged over 20 points per game in his junior season while leading the Lions on an improbable run to the WCC Tournament Semifinals, despite finishing 1–15 in WCC play. The Lions season ended with a 66–48 loss to nationally No. 1 ranked Gonzaga.

Ireland's senior season saw him dive further into the LMU record books, eclipsing the 2,000 career points mark and being named First Team All-WCC for a third time. However, the Lions finished in last place again in WCC play, leading to the firing of Coach Good.

In 2019, Ireland was inducted into the LMU Athletics Hall of Fame. At the time of his induction, Ireland held the record for most games played in school history, ranked second all-time in assists and steals, third in total scoring, and fifth in 3-pointers made.

== Professional career ==
=== Playing overseas ===
After completing his collegiate career, Ireland opted to pursue professional options in Europe over playing in the NBA D-League due to financial reasons. In preparation for the first stop of his professional career in France, Ireland took part in the 2014 Greater Hartford Pro-Am league.

Ireland spent his first professional season in France in 2014–15, playing for Elan Chalon of the Ligue Nationale de Basket (LNB), averaging 9.3 points and 3.4 assists per contest in 30 games.

=== NBA Summer League ===
After one season in France, Ireland participated in the 2015 NBA Summer League as a Los Angeles Lakers organization member. Ireland appeared in 3 games, scoring just a single point in his brief Summer League stint.

=== Back overseas ===
Ireland returned overseas to play in 9 games for Arkadikos B.C. of the Greek Basket League, averaging over 6.2 points per game in the 2015–16 season.

Ireland spent parts of the 2015–16 and 2016–17 seasons with Trefl Sopot in the Polska Liga Koszykowki (PLK). Anthony posted averages of 19.7 points, 4.7 rebounds, and 3 assists per game in his first season with Trefl, and 17.6 points, 2.9 rebounds and 2.8 assists per game in his second season.

Moving to Utenos Juventus of the Lithuanian Basketball League in 2017–18, Ireland averaged 14.2 points and 4.7 assists per game in league play. Juventus also participated in the Basketball Champions League and the 2018 FIBA Europe Cup.

On October 18, 2018, Ireland signed with Russian team Avtodor Saratov of the VTB United League. Ireland averaged 7.5 points per game in 13 contests in 2019 Europe Cup play.

For the 2019–20 season, Ireland signed with S.L. Benfica in the Liga Portuguesa de Basquetebol (LPB). Ireland had his most productive Europe Cup performance, averaging 15.1 points, 6.6 assists, and 4.9 rebounds per game.

In January 2021, Ireland joined Egis Kormend of the Nemzeti Bajnokság I/A, playing for Coach Ziga Mravljak. Ireland put up 14.8 points, 2.3 rebounds, and 4.8 assists per game in his lone season in Hungary.

On May 4, 2021, he returned to the PLK, signing with HydroTruck Radom. In 2021–22, Ireland averaged 14.6 points, 3.3 rebounds, and 6.5 assists per game.

== Career statistics ==
=== Loyola Marymount University (2010–14) ===
SEASON	TEAM	GP	GS	W-L	MIN	FG%	3P%	FT%	REB	AST	STL	BLK	PTS
2010-11	LMU Lions	32	25	11-21	31.0	39.4	34.5	71.0	3.7	3.0	1.0.	0.2	10.6
2011-12	LMU Lions	34	33	21-13	36.5	44.0	33.8	77.1	3.9	4.9	1.7	0.0	16.1
2012-13	LMU Lions	34	34	11-23	37.5	41.3	37.6	82.3	4.4	3.6	1.7	0.0	20.1
2013-14	LMU Lions	32	32	13-19	35.2	40.9	31.3	81.7	3.7	5.4	1.7	0.1	18.0
Career Averages					35.1	41.5	34.5	79.6	3.9	4.2	1.5	0.1	16.5

=== Professional Statistics (2014–2022) ===
SEASON	TEAM	LEAGUE	GP	W-L	MIN	FG%	3P%	FT%	REB	AST	STL	TO	BLK	PTS
14-15	Chalon	FRA-1	30	17-13	24.7	43.8	32.3	84.1	2.6	3.4	0.9	1.7	0.0	9.3
15-16	Arkadikos	GRE-1	8	3-5	13.9	43.2	36.4	73.7	1.8	1.6	0.4	1.3	0.0	7.0
15-16	Trefl Sopot	POL-1	7	3-4	28.7	43.5	54.5	62.5	4.7	3.0	1.4	1.9	0.1	19.7
16-17	Trefl Sopot	POL-1	32	18-14	28.8	48.5	38.4	89.3	2.8	2.8	0.8	2.1	0.1	17.6
17-18	Juventus	LIT-1	26	9-16	27.0	44.4	44.9	87.5	3.6	4.7	1.4	2.5	0.0	14.2
18-19	Avtodor Saratov	VTB L.	21	7-14	15.6	41.7	42.9	89.7	1.5	3.0	0.4	1.0	0.0	7.6
19-20	S.L. Benfica	POR-1	14	13-1	20.3	42.0	36.8	83.3	2.7	5.6	1.2	1.9	0.0	8.1
20-21	Egis Kormend	HUN-1	13	6-7	26.4	47.9	36.2	77.3	2.3	4.8	1.2	2.5	0.0	14.8
21-22	HydroTruck Radom	POL-1	28	5-23	30.9	40.0	33.6	80.2	3.3	6.5	0.9	3.5	0.0	14.6

== Personal life ==
=== Family ===
Ireland and his younger brother Elijah were raised by his single-mother, Lynda Carter. As his mom toiled to provide for her son, their family moved all across the country, ranging from Connecticut to Arkansas and San Diego.

=== Education ===
Ireland graduated from Crosby High School in Connecticut in 2009 - where he lettered in basketball and cross-country. He spent a post-graduate year at Winchendon School to improve his basketball skills, academics, and discipline. He completed his undergraduate study at Loyola Marymount University in 2014, receiving a Bachelor of Arts in African American Studies.

In 2025, Ireland was appointed as the newest Commissioner for the Waterbury Board of Education.

=== AI3 Foundation ===
In 2015, Ireland cofounded a foundation, AI3 Leadership Academy, in Waterbury, Connecticut that works to nurture young minds to be the best that they can be as leaders, on and off the basketball court. His nonprofit focuses on the personal and social development of its participants by encouraging them to do what they love, be involved in community engagement, interact in positive social change and develop valuable attributes and characteristics that will help them thrive individually and communally as young adults and responsible citizens.

The AI3 Leadership Academy was created by Ireland and childhood friend, Joe Summa, with the intention of bridging people of all backgrounds within the Waterbury community through basketball. This foundation was a response to the deteriorating of outdoor courts in the Waterbury area, and to give the youth a physical place to play basketball. The 2019 AI3 Skills camp had an attendance of over 200 kids, helping to fulfill Ireland's vision.
