= 2012–13 San Diego Toreros men's basketball team =

American college basketball season

2012–13 San Diego Toreros men's basketball
- Conference: West Coast Conference
- Record: 16–18 (7–9 WCC)
- Head coach: Bill Grier (6th season)
- Assistant coaches: Mike Burns; Rodney Tention; Kyle Bankhead
- Home arena: Jenny Craig Pavilion

2012–13 West Coast Conference men's basketball standings
	Conf.				Overall
Team	W		L	PCT	W		L	PCT
No. 1 Gonzaga†	16	–	0	1.000	32	–	3	.914
Saint Mary's	14	–	2	.875	28	–	7	.800
BYU	10	–	6	.625	24	–	12	.667
Santa Clara	9	–	7	.563	26	–	12	.684
San Francisco	7	–	9	.438	15	–	16	.484
San Diego	7	–	9	.438	16	–	18	.471
Pepperdine	4	–	12	.250	12	–	18	.400
Portland	4	–	12	.250	11	–	21	.344
Loyola Marymount	1	–	15	.063	11	–	23	.324
† Conference tournament winner Rankings from AP poll

The 2012–13 San Diego Toreros men's basketball]team represented the University of San Diego during the 2012–13 NCAA Division I men's basketball season. This was head coach Bill Grier's sixth season at San Diego. The Toreros competed in the West Coast Conference and played their home games at the Jenny Craig Pavilion. They finished the season 16–18, 7–9 in WCC play to finish in a tie for fifth place. They advanced to the semifinials of the WCC tournament where they lost to Saint Mary's.

== Before the season ==
=== Departures ===
Name	Number	Pos.	Height	Weight	Year	Hometown	Notes
Darian Norris	3	G	6'0"	180	Senior	Las Vegas, NV	Graduated
Ben Vozzola	14	G	6'5"	180	RS Freshman	Las Vegas, NV	Transferred
Blair Banker	24	F	6'8"	220	RS Freshman	West Lafayette, IN	Transferred to Point Loma Nazarene University before the start of the 2012–13 season
Chris Gabriel	42	C	6'11"	180	Junior	Cape Town, South Africa	Dismissed from team
Jordan Mackie	10	G	6'4"	200	Sophomore	Los Angeles, CA	Dismissed from team

=== Recruits ===
College recruiting information (2012)
Name	Hometown	School	Height	Weight	Commit date
C. Calvin "Trey" Guidry, III; SF	Houston, TX	St. Pius X	6 ft 6 in (1.98 m)	215 lb (98 kg)	Nov 9, 2011
C. Calvin "Trey" Guidry, III; SF	Recruit ratings: Scout: Rivals: (86)				
Aaron Michael "Mike" David; SG	Houston, TX	Western Texas	6 ft 2 in (1.88 m)	200 lb (91 kg)	May 10, 2012
Aaron Michael "Mike" David; SG	Recruit ratings: Scout: Rivals: (JC)				
Jito Kok; PF	Wageningen	Canarias Basketball Academy	6 ft 9 in (2.06 m)	230 lb (100 kg)	May 10, 2012
Jito Kok; PF	Recruit ratings: Scout: Rivals: (83)				
Duda Sanadaze; G	Tbilisi, Georgia		6 ft 5 in (1.96 m)	209 lb (95 kg)	Aug 29, 2012
Duda Sanadaze; G	Recruit ratings: Scout: Rivals: (NR)				
Overall recruit ranking: Scout: nr Rivals: nr ESPN: nr
Note: In many cases, Scout, Rivals, 247Sports, On3, and ESPN may conflict in their listings of height and weight.; In these cases, the average was taken. ESPN grades are on a 100-point scale.; Sources: "San Diego Toreros 2012 Basketball Commitments". Rivals.; "2012 San Diego Toreros Basketball Commits". Scout.; "ESPN 2012 San Diego Toreros Basketball recruits". ESPN.; "Scout.com Team Recruiting Rankings". Scout.; "2012 Team Ranking". Rivals.

== Roster ==
2012–13 San Diego Toreros men's basketball team
Players
Coaches

Pos.	#	Name	Height	Weight	Year	Previous school	Hometown
G	0	Christopher Anderson	5 ft 7 in (1.7 m)	150 lb (68 kg)	So	Canyon	Anaheim Hills, CA
G	1	Johnny Dee	6 ft 0 in (1.83 m)	175 lb (79 kg)	So	Rancho Buena Vista	Vista, CA
G	2	Mike Davis	6 ft 2 in (1.88 m)	200 lb (91 kg)	Jr	Phillis Wheatley; Texas Tech	Houston, TX
G	3	Therone Tillett (redshirt)	5 ft 11 in (1.8 m)	185 lb (84 kg)	Fr	John R. Rogers	Spokane, WA
G	4	Nick Kerr	6 ft 3 in (1.91 m)	175 lb (79 kg)	So	Torrey Pines	San Diego, CA
F	5	Chris Manresa	6 ft 9 in (2.06 m)	245 lb (111 kg)	Sr	Tesoro	Rancho Santa Margarita, CA
G	10	Duda Sanadze	6 ft 5 in (1.96 m)	209 lb (95 kg)	RS Fr	Tbilisi, Georgia
G	13	Keith Stackhouse (redshirt)	6 ft 2 in (1.88 m)	185 lb (84 kg)	Fr	Squalicum	Bellingham, WA
F	15	Thomas Jacobs	6 ft 6 in (1.98 m)	215 lb (98 kg)	Jr	Scripps Ranch; Cal State Northridge	San Diego, CA
G	20	Cameron Miles	6 ft 1 in (1.85 m)	175 lb (79 kg)	Sr	Skyline	Dallas, TX
G	21	Jordan Bickerstaff (redshirt)	5 ft 10 in (1.78 m)	150 lb (68 kg)	Fr	Smoky Hill	Denver, CO
F/C	22	Brandon Perry (redshirt)	6 ft 7 in (2.01 m)	265 lb (120 kg)	Fr	Taft; Cal State Northridge	Fresno, CA
F	23	Trey Guidry	6 ft 6 in (1.98 m)	215 lb (98 kg)	Fr	St. Puis X	Houston, TX
F/C	25	Simi Fajemisin	6 ft 10 in (2.08 m)	265 lb (120 kg)	RS So	Lynnwood	Lynnwood, WA
G/F	31	John Sinis	6 ft 9 in (2.06 m)	235 lb (107 kg)	So	Apollon U-18	Patras, Greece
F	32	Ken Rancifer	6 ft 5 in (1.96 m)	215 lb (98 kg)	Sr	El Cerrito	Oakland, CA
F/C	33	Jito Kok	6 ft 9 in (2.06 m)	230 lb (104 kg)	Fr	Canarius Basketball Academy	Wageningen, Netherlands
F	40	Dennis Kramer	6 ft 11 in (2.11 m)	235 lb (107 kg)	Jr	La Costa Canyon	Encinitas, CA

Head coach

- Bill Grier (Oregon)

Assistant coach(es)

- Mike Burns (Central Washington)
- Rodney Tention (San Francisco)
- Kyle Bankhead (Gonzaga)

Legend

- (C) Team captain
- (S) Suspended
- (I) Ineligible
- (W) Walk-on
- Injured
- Current redshirt

== Schedule and results ==
Date time, TV	Opponent	Result	Record	Site (attendance) city, state
Non-conference Regular Season
11/09/2012*; 7:00 pm	San Diego Christian	W 91–58	1–0	Jenny Craig Pavilion (1,057); San Diego, CA
11/14/2012*; 7:00 pm	Northern Kentucky; NUCDF Basketball Challenge	W 65–61	2–0	Jenny Craig Pavilion (1,297); San Diego, CA
11/15/2012*; 7:00 pm	Cal State Northridge; NUCDF Basketball Challenge	L 71–74	2–1	Jenny Craig Pavilion (1,288); San Diego, CA
11/16/2012*; 7:00 pm, FSSD	Tulsa; NUCDF Basketball Challenge	L 51–63	2–2	Jenny Craig Pavilion (1,442); San Diego, CA
11/18/2012*; 1:00 pm, FSSD	Siena; NUCDF Basketball Challenge	W 77–60	3–2	Jenny Craig Pavilion (N/A); San Diego, CA
11/21/2012*; 7:00 pm	at UC Santa Barbara	L 39–57	3–3	UC Santa Barbara Events Center (2,392); Santa Barbara, CA
11/24/2012*; 5:00 pm, Big Sky TV	at Montana	L 66–67	3–4	Dahlberg Arena (3,270); Missoula, MT
12/01/2012*; 4:00 pm	at Stephen F. Austin	L 51–56	3–5	William R. Johnson Coliseum (1,726); Nacogdoches, TX
12/04/2012*; 6:00 pm, Big Sky TV	at Southern Utah	W 67–53	4–5	Centrum Arena (3,241); Cedar City, UT
12/08/2012*; 6:00 pm, FSSD	Tulane	W 78–72	5–5	Jenny Craig Pavilion (2,182); San Diego, CA
12/11/2012*; 7:00 pm	Arizona Christian	W 88–65	6–5	Jenny Craig Pavilion (1,087); San Diego, CA
12/15/2012*; 7:00 pm, 4SD	at No. 18 San Diego State; City Championship	L 56–72	6–6	Viejas Arena (12,414); San Diego, CA
12/22/2012*; 6:00 pm, Pac-12	vs. Oregon State	L 79–86	6–7	MGM Grand Garden Arena (840); Las Vegas, NV
12/23/2012*; 3:30 pm	vs. James Madison	L 59–62	6–8	MGM Grand Garden Arena (732); Las Vegas, NV
12/29/2012*; 7:30 pm	Morgan State	W 66–63	7–8	Jenny Craig Pavilion (1,277); San Diego, CA
WCC Regular Season
01/03/2013; 8:00 pm, FSSD	Portland	W 61–50	8–8 (1–0)	Jenny Craig Pavilion (1,851); San Diego, CA
01/10/2013; 7:00 pm, WCC Digital	at San Francisco	W 70–66	9–8 (2–0)	War Memorial Gymnasium (1,135); San Francisco, CA
01/12/2013; 7:00 pm, WCC Digital	at Pepperdine	W 62–50	10–8 (3–0)	Firestone Fieldhouse (1,047); Malibu, CA
01/16/2013; 7:00 pm, TWCSN	Loyola Marymount	W 78–70	11–8 (4–0)	Jenny Craig Pavilion (3,079); San Diego, CA
01/19/2013; 6:00 pm, BYUtv	at BYU	L 57–74	11–9 (4–1)	Marriott Center (17,281); Provo, UT
01/24/2013; 8:00 pm, CSNBA	at Saint Mary's	L 48–81	11–10 (4–2)	McKeon Pavilion (3,206); Moraga, CA
01/26/2013; 1:00 pm, WCC TV	Santa Clara	L 50–64	11–11 (4–3)	Jenny Craig Pavilion (2,415); San Diego, CA
02/02/2013; 8:00 pm, ESPNU	No. 7 Gonzaga	L 63–65	11–12 (4–4)	Jenny Craig Pavilion (4,759); San Diego, CA
02/04/2013; 7:00 pm, TWCSN	at Loyola Marymount	W 69–68 ^{OT}	12–12 (5–4)	Gersten Pavilion (1,069); Los Angeles, CA
02/07/2013; 7:00 pm, BYUtv	BYU	W 74–68	13–12 (6–4)	Jenny Craig Pavilion (3,296); San Diego, CA
02/09/2013; 8:00 pm, ESPNU	Saint Mary's	L 64–74	13–13 (6–5)	Jenny Craig Pavilion (3,446); San Diego, CA
02/14/2013; 7:00 pm, WCC Digital	at Santa Clara	L 52–61	13–14 (6–6)	Leavey Center (1,394); Santa Clara, CA
02/21/2013; 7:00 pm, RTNW	at Portland	L 67–70	13–15 (6–7)	Chiles Center (1,332); Portland, OR
02/23/2013; 4:00 pm, TWCSN/RTNW	at No. 3 Gonzaga	L 50–81	13–16 (6–8)	McCarthey Athletic Center (6,000); Spokane, WA
02/28/2013; 6:00 pm, FSSD	San Francisco	L 70–83	13–17 (6–9)	Jenny Craig Pavilion (1,731); San Diego, CA
03/02/2013; 12:00 pm, TWCSN	Pepperdine	W 76–69	14–17 (7–9)	Jenny Craig Pavilion (2,209); San Diego, CA
2013 West Coast Conference men's basketball tournament
03/07/2013; 8:30 pm, BYUtv/ WCC Digital	vs. Pepperdine; Second Round	W 62–59	15–17	Orleans Arena (7,896); Las Vegas, NV
03/08/2013; 8:30 pm, ESPNU	vs. BYU; Quarterfinals	W 72–69	16–17	Orleans Arena (7,896); Las Vegas, NV
03/09/2013; 8:45 pm, ESPN2	vs. Saint Mary's; Semifinals	L 66–69 ^{OT}	16–18	Orleans Arena (7,896); Las Vegas, NV
*Non-conference game. ^{#}Rankings from AP Poll. (#) Tournament seedings in parentheses. All times are in Pacific Time.
