= 2012–13 Pepperdine Waves men's basketball team =

American college basketball season

2012–13 Pepperdine Waves men's basketball
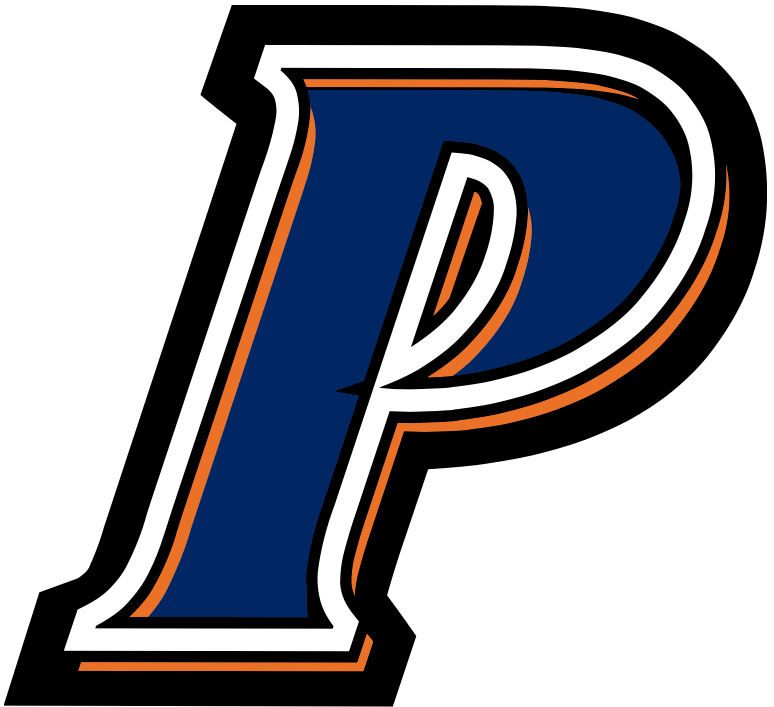
- Conference: West Coast Conference
- Record: 12–18 (4–12 WCC)
- Head coach: Marty Wilson (2nd season)
- Assistant coaches: Mark Amaral; Bryant Moore; Jason Hart
- Home arena: Firestone Fieldhouse

2012–13 West Coast Conference men's basketball standings
	Conf.				Overall
Team	W		L	PCT	W		L	PCT
No. 1 Gonzaga†	16	–	0	1.000	32	–	3	.914
Saint Mary's	14	–	2	.875	28	–	7	.800
BYU	10	–	6	.625	24	–	12	.667
Santa Clara	9	–	7	.563	26	–	12	.684
San Francisco	7	–	9	.438	15	–	16	.484
San Diego	7	–	9	.438	16	–	18	.471
Pepperdine	4	–	12	.250	12	–	18	.400
Portland	4	–	12	.250	11	–	21	.344
Loyola Marymount	1	–	15	.063	11	–	23	.324
† Conference tournament winner Rankings from AP poll

The 2012–13 Pepperdine Waves men's basketball team represented Pepperdine University during the 2012–13 NCAA Division I men's basketball season. This was head coach Marty Wilson's second full season at Pepperdine. The Waves played their home games at the Firestone Fieldhouse and were members of the West Coast Conference. They finished the season 12–18, 4–12 in WCC play, to finish in a tie for seventh place. They lost in the second round of the WCC tournament to San Diego.

== Before the season ==
=== Departures ===
Name	Number	Pos.	Height	Weight	Year	Hometown	Notes
Dane Suttle Jr.	14	G/F	6'6"	210	Senior	Los Angeles, CA	Graduated
Richard Branning	11	G	6'2"	175	Senior	Menlo Park, CA	Graduated
Don Martin	33	G	6'4"	195	Senior	Gladstone, MO	Graduated
Corbin Moore	44	C	6'10"	235	Senior	Cypress, CA	Graduated
Taylor Darby	41	F	6'8"	230	Senior	San Marcos, CA	Graduated; Signed a contract with Bohemios in Uruguay
Hector Harold	21	F	6'7"	205	Sophomore	Pasadena, CA	Transferred to Vermont
Joshua Lowery	10	G	6'3"	195	Junior	Phoenix, AZ	Transferred to Grand Canyon
Ramon Eaton	24	F	6'8"	200	Freshman	Sacramento, CA	Transferred to New Mexico JC

=== Recruits ===
College recruiting information (2012)
Name	Hometown	School	Height	Weight	Commit date
Stacy Davis; F	Laveen, AZ	Betty H. Fairfax	6 ft 6 in (1.98 m)	225 lb (102 kg)	Sep 22, 2011
Stacy Davis; F	Recruit ratings: Scout: Rivals: (86)				
Atif Russell; F	Katy, TX	Seven Lakes	6 ft 5 in (1.96 m)	195 lb (88 kg)	Oct 21, 2011
Atif Russell; F	Recruit ratings: Scout: Rivals: (NR)				
Brendan Lane; F	Rocklin, CA	UCLA	6 ft 9 in (2.06 m)	223 lb (101 kg)	Apr 11, 2012
Brendan Lane; F	Recruit ratings: Scout: Rivals: (TR)				
Jett Raines; F	Coppell, TX	Coppell	6 ft 8 in (2.03 m)	N/A	Apr 12, 2012
Jett Raines; F	Recruit ratings: Scout: Rivals: (NR)				
Malte Kramer; F	San Luis Obispo, CA	Cuesta College	6 ft 7 in (2.01 m)	215 lb (98 kg)	Apr 13, 2012
Malte Kramer; F	Recruit ratings: Scout: Rivals: (JC)				
Overall recruit ranking: Scout: nr Rivals: nr ESPN: nr
Note: In many cases, Scout, Rivals, 247Sports, On3, and ESPN may conflict in their listings of height and weight.; In these cases, the average was taken. ESPN grades are on a 100-point scale.; Sources: "Pepperdine Waves 2012 Basketball Commitments". Rivals.; "2012 Pepperdine Waves Basketball Commits". Scout.; "ESPN 2012 Pepperdine Waves Basketball recruits". ESPN.; "Scout.com Team Recruiting Rankings". Scout.; "2012 Team Ranking". Rivals.

== Roster ==
2012–13 Pepperdine Waves men's basketball team
Players
Coaches

Pos.	#	Name	Height	Weight	Year	Previous school	Hometown
G	1	Jordan Baker	6 ft 3 in (1.91 m)	180 lb (82 kg)	So	Tempe	Tempe, AZ
G	2	Dominic Redix	6 ft 0 in (1.83 m)	185 lb (84 kg)	Jr	Granite Hills	Apple Valley, CA
F	5	Stacy Davis	6 ft 6 in (1.98 m)	240 lb (109 kg)	Fr	Laveen Betty Fairfax	Laveen, AZ
G	11	Atif Russell	6 ft 4 in (1.93 m)	200 lb (91 kg)	Fr	Seven Lakes	Katy, TX
G	13	Austin Mills	6 ft 0 in (1.83 m)	170 lb (77 kg)	Fr	Beverly Hills	Beverly Hills, CA
G	20	Lorne Jackson	6 ft 2 in (1.88 m)	205 lb (93 kg)	RS Sr	Simi Valley	Simi Valley, CA
G	23	Caleb Willis	6 ft 2 in (1.88 m)	220 lb (100 kg)	Sr	Stockbridge	Stockbridge, GA
G	31	Jerry Jones	5 ft 10 in (1.78 m)	190 lb (86 kg)	Fr	Cherokee Trail	Aurora, CA
F	34	Manny Ochenje	6 ft 9 in (2.06 m)	205 lb (93 kg)	So	Brehm Prep	Abuja, Nigeria
F	44	Malte Kramer	6 ft 6 in (1.98 m)	215 lb (98 kg)	Jr	Cuesta College	San Luis Obispo, CA
F	45	Jett Raines	6 ft 7 in (2.01 m)	195 lb (88 kg)	Fr	Coppell	Coppell, TX
F	50	Moriba De Freitas	6 ft 9 in (2.06 m)	220 lb (100 kg)	RS Jr	Williston State JC	Bon Air Gardens, Trinidad
C	55	Jan Maehlen	7 ft 0 in (2.13 m)	315 lb (143 kg)	RS So	Ironwood Ridge	Tucson, AZ
G	xx	Brendan Lane (redshirt)	6 ft 9 in (2.06 m)	223 lb (101 kg)	Sr	UCLA	Rocklin, CA

Head coach

- Marty Wilson (Pepperdine)

Assistant coach(es)

- Marak Amaral (College of Idaho)
- Bryant Moore (Texas Tech)
- Jason Hart (Syracuse)

Legend

- (C) Team captain
- (S) Suspended
- (I) Ineligible
- (W) Walk-on
- Injured
- Current redshirt

== Schedule and results ==
All non-conference home games, and conference home games not picked up by the WCC regional packages, are shown on TV-32 in Malibu, known as Pepperdine TV. They are also shown on pepperdinesports.com at no cost for all fans to enjoy.

Date time, TV	Opponent	Result	Record	Site (attendance) city, state
Exhibition
11/03/2012*; 5:00 pm, TV-32	Cal Lutheran	W 81–49	0–0	Firestone Fieldhouse (1,178); Malibu, CA
Non-conference regular season
11/09/2012*; 7:30 pm	at Cal State Northridge	L 75–81	0–1	Matadome (1,256); Northridge, CA
11/13/2012*; 6:30 pm, Pac-12	at California	L 62–79	0–2	Haas Pavilion (6,403); Berkeley, CA
11/16/2012*; 7:00 pm, TV-32	Washington State	W 58–56 ^{OT}	1–2	Firestone Fieldhouse (1,210); Malibu, CA
11/20/2012*; 5:00 pm, Legacy Sports Network	at Houston Baptist	W 57–53 ^{OT}	2–2	Sharp Gymnasium (815); Houston, TX
11/24/2012*; 7:00 pm, TV-32	UC Irvine	W 72–62	3–2	Firestone Fieldhouse (662); Malibu, CA
11/29/2012*; 7:00 pm, Big Sky TV	at Montana State	W 76–66	4–2	Worthington Arena (2,472); Bozeman, MT
12/01/2012*; 6:05 pm, UVU-TV	at Utah Valley	L 63–67 ^{OT}	4–3	UCCU Center (3,427); Orem, UT
12/05/2012*; 7:00 pm, TV-32	UC Riverside	W 62–40	5–3	Firestone Fieldhouse (921); Malibu, CA
12/08/2012*; 9:00 pm, OC Sports	at Hawaii	W 63–56	6–3	Stan Sheriff Center (5,931); Honolulu, HI
12/16/2012*; 5:00 pm, TV-32	Central Michigan	L 77–80	6–4	Firestone Fieldhouse (707); Malibu, CA
12/19/2012*; 2:00 pm	vs. Alabama State; Tulane Classic	W 66–58	7–4	Devlin Fieldhouse (1,502); New Orleans, LA
12/20/2012*; 5:00 pm	at Tulane; Tulane Classic	L 54–69	7–5	Devlin Fieldhouse (1,571); New Orleans, LA
12/28/2012*; 7:30 pm, TV-32	Fresno Pacific	W 60–59	8–5	Firestone Fieldhouse (535); Malibu, CA
WCC regular season
01/03/2013; 6:00 pm, TWC SportsNet/ROOT	No. 10 Gonzaga	L 62–78	8–6 (0–1)	Firestone Fieldhouse (1,938); Malibu, CA
01/05/2013; 7:00 pm, WCC Digital	Portland	W 54–47	9–6 (1–1)	Firestone Fieldhouse (892); Malibu, CA
01/10/2013; 6:00 pm, BYUtv	at BYU	L 51–76	9–7 (1–2)	Marriott Center (14,888); Provo, UT
01/12/2013; 7:00 pm, WCC Digital	San Diego	L 50–62	9–8 (1–3)	Firestone Fieldhouse (1,047); Malibu, CA
01/19/2013; 7:00 pm, WCC Digital	Santa Clara	L 76–83	9–9 (1–4)	Firestone Fieldhouse (1,191); Malibu, CA
01/24/2013; 6:00 pm, TWC SportsNet	at Loyola Marymount	W 60–57	10–9 (2–4)	Gersten Pavilion (3,130); Los Angeles, CA
01/26/2013; 3:00 pm, TWC SportsNet	at Saint Mary's	L 72–84	10–10 (2–5)	McKeon Pavilion (3,500); Moraga, CA
01/31/2013; 7:00 pm, TWC SportsNet	BYU	L 61–63	10–11 (2–6)	Firestone Fieldhouse (1,824); Malibu, CA
02/02/2013; 2:30 pm, TWC SportsNet	San Francisco	L 78–86	10–12 (2–7)	Firestone Fieldhouse (1,071); Malibu, CA
02/07/2013; 8:00 pm, ROOT	at No. 6 Gonzaga	L 56–82	10–13 (2–8)	McCarthey Athletic Center (6,000); Spokane, WA
02/09/2013; 1:00 pm, TWC SportsNet	at Portland	W 72–68 ^{OT}	11–13 (3–8)	Chiles Center (1,565); Portland, OR
02/14/2013; 7:00 pm, WCC Digital	Loyola Marymount	W 52–50	12–13 (4–8)	Firestone Fieldhouse (1,138); Malibu, CA
02/16/2013; 7:00 pm, WCC Digital	at Santa Clara	L 60–70	12–14 (4–9)	Leavey Center (2,603); Santa Clara, CA
02/23/2013; 6:00 pm, TWC SportsNet	at San Francisco	L 58–64	12–15 (4–10)	War Memorial Gymnasium (2,321); San Francisco, CA
02/27/2013; 8:00 pm, ESPNU	Saint Mary's	L 48–87	12–16 (4–11)	Firestone Fieldhouse (926); Malibu, CA
03/02/2013; 12:00 pm, TWC SportsNet	at San Diego	L 69–76	12–17 (4–12)	Jenny Craig Pavilion (2,209); San Diego, CA
2013 West Coast Conference men's basketball tournament
03/07/2013; 8:30 pm, BYUtv	vs. San Diego; Second Round	L 59–62	12–18	Orleans Arena (7,896); Las Vegas, NV
*Non-conference game. ^{#}Rankings from AP poll. (#) Tournament seedings in parentheses.
