= 2012–13 Santa Clara Broncos men's basketball team =

American college basketball season

2012–13 Santa Clara Broncos men's basketball
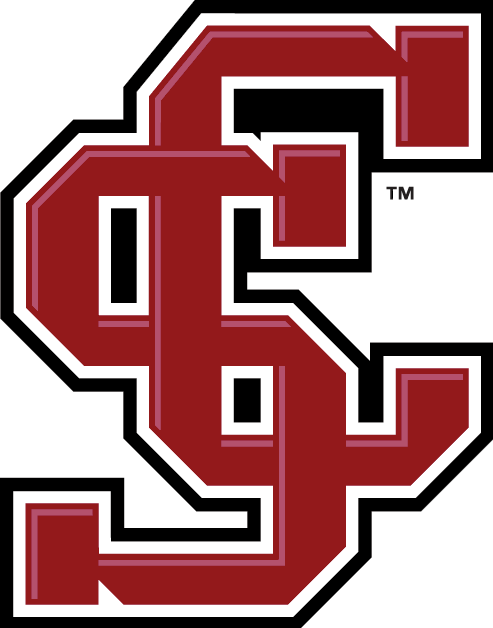

College Basketball Invitational champion

CBI champion
- Conference: West Coast Conference
- Record: 26–12 (9–7 WCC)
- Head coach: Kerry Keating (6th season)
- Assistant coaches: Dustin Kerns; Sam Scholl; Jesse Pruitt
- Home arena: Leavey Center

2012–13 West Coast Conference men's basketball standings
	Conf.				Overall
Team	W		L	PCT	W		L	PCT
No. 1 Gonzaga†	16	–	0	1.000	32	–	3	.914
Saint Mary's	14	–	2	.875	28	–	7	.800
BYU	10	–	6	.625	24	–	12	.667
Santa Clara	9	–	7	.563	26	–	12	.684
San Francisco	7	–	9	.438	15	–	16	.484
San Diego	7	–	9	.438	16	–	18	.471
Pepperdine	4	–	12	.250	12	–	18	.400
Portland	4	–	12	.250	11	–	21	.344
Loyola Marymount	1	–	15	.063	11	–	23	.324
† Conference tournament winner Rankings from AP poll

The 2012–13 Santa Clara Broncos men's basketball team represented the University of Santa Clara during the 2012–13 NCAA Division I men's basketball season. This was head coach Kerry Keating's sixth season at Santa Clara. The Broncos played their home games at the Leavey Center and were members of the West Coast Conference. They finished the season 26–12, 9–7 in WCC play to finish in fourth place. They lost in the quarterfinals of the WCC tournament to Loyola Marymount. They were invited to the 2013 College Basketball Invitational where they defeated Vermont, Purdue and Wright State to advance to the best-of-three games finals against George Mason. They won the series 2 games to 1 to become the 2013 CBI Champions. Santa Clara is the first school to win a CBI championship and a CIT championship (CIT won by the 2010–11 team).

== Before the Season ==
=== Departures ===
Name	Number	Pos.	Height	Weight	Year	Hometown	Notes
Phillip Bach	33	G	6'4"	195	Senior	Medina, WA	Graduated

=== Recruiting ===
College recruiting information
Name	Hometown	School	Height	Weight	Commit date
Nate Kratch; F	Watertown, Minnesota	Watertown-Mayer	6 ft 6 in (1.98 m)	210 lb (95 kg)	Sep 29, 2011
Nate Kratch; F	Recruit ratings: Scout: Rivals: (82)				
Overall recruit ranking: Scout: nr Rivals: nr ESPN: nr
Note: In many cases, Scout, Rivals, 247Sports, On3, and ESPN may conflict in their listings of height and weight.; In these cases, the average was taken. ESPN grades are on a 100-point scale.; Sources: "ESPN". ESPN.; "2012 Team Ranking". Rivals.

== Roster ==
2012–13 Santa Clara Broncos men's basketball team
Players
Coaches

Pos.	#	Name	Height	Weight	Year	Previous school	Hometown
G	0	Evan Roquemore	6 ft 3 in (1.91 m)	175 lb (79 kg)	Jr	Foothill	Henderson, NV
G	3	Brandon Clark	6 ft 0 in (1.83 m)	165 lb (75 kg)	So	Merrillville	East Chicago, IN
G	4	Kyle Perricone	6 ft 3 in (1.91 m)	195 lb (88 kg)	Sr	Gunn	Palo Alto, CA
F	15	Marc Trasolini	6 ft 9 in (2.06 m)	235 lb (107 kg)	RS Sr	Vancouver College	Vancouver, British Columbia, Canada
G	20	Denzel Johnson	6 ft 3 in (1.91 m)	195 lb (88 kg)	So	Clovis West	Fresno, CA
G	21	Kevin Foster	6 ft 2 in (1.88 m)	219 lb (99 kg)	Sr	Morton Ranch	Katy, TX
G	24	Julian Clarke	6 ft 3 in (1.91 m)	200 lb (91 kg)	So	Oakwood Collegiate	Toronto, Ontario, Canada
F	25	John McArthur	6 ft 9 in (2.06 m)	230 lb (104 kg)	Jr	De La Salle	Danville, CA
G	31	Niyi Harrison	6 ft 8 in (2.03 m)	225 lb (102 kg)	Sr	Bellarmine College Prep	Milpitas, CA
C	35	Robert Garrett	7 ft 0 in (2.13 m)	225 lb (102 kg)	So	Sacramento	Vallejo, CA
G	42	Raymond Cowels III	6 ft 4 in (1.93 m)	215 lb (98 kg)	Sr	Hopkins	Minneapolis, MN
F	43	Nate Kratch (redshirt)	6 ft 6 in (1.98 m)	210 lb (95 kg)	Fr	Watertown-Mayer	Watertown, MN
F	44	Yannick Atanga	6 ft 8 in (2.03 m)	225 lb (102 kg)	So	Besant Hill of Happy Valley (Ojai, CA)	Yaoundé, Cameroon

Head coach

- Kerry Keating (Seton Hall)

Assistant coach(es)

- Dustin Kerns (Clemson)
- Sam Scholl (San Diego)
- Jesse Pruitt (UC Davis)

Legend

- (C) Team captain
- (S) Suspended
- (I) Ineligible
- (W) Walk-on
- Injured
- Current redshirt

== Schedule and results ==
Date time, TV	Opponent	Result	Record	Site (attendance) city, state
Exhibition
10/30/2012*; 7:00 pm	Hawaii Pacific	W 64–63	–	Leavey Center (1,176); Santa Clara, CA
Regular season
11/10/2012*; 7:00 pm	Simpson	W 106–66	1–0	Leavey Center (1,296); Santa Clara, CA
11/14/2012*; 5:00 pm, FCS Atlantic	at Saint Louis; CBE Hall of Fame Classic	W 74–62	2–0	Chaifetz Arena (5,058); St. Louis, MO
11/20/2012*; 8:00 pm	USC Upstate; CBE Hall of Fame Classic	W 85–65	3–0	Leavey Center (1,139); Santa Clara, CA
11/21/2012*; 8:00 pm	Utah Valley; CBE Hall of Fame Classic	W 75–67	4–0	Leavey Center (1,222); Santa Clara, CA
11/23/2012*; 4:00 pm	Eastern Washington; CBE Hall of Fame Classic	W 89–74	5–0	Leavey Center (1,250); Santa Clara, CA
11/28/2012*; 7:00 pm	Utah State	L 78–80 ^{OT}	5–1	Leavey Center (1,442); Santa Clara, CA
12/01/2012*; 7:00 pm	UC Santa Barbara	L 80–83 ^{OT}	5–2	Leavey Center (1,819); Santa Clara, CA
12/08/2012*; 7:00 pm	Pacific Union	W 77–42	6–2	Leavey Center (1,253); Santa Clara, CA
12/11/2012*; 7:00 pm	at San Jose State	W 75–54	7–2	Event Center Arena (2,037); San Jose, CA
12/15/2012*; 5:00 pm	at Pacific	W 75–71	8–2	Alex G. Spanos Center (1,879); Stockton, CA
12/17/2012*; 7:00 pm	Cal Poly	W 72–64	9–2	Leavey Center (1,558); Santa Clara, CA
12/21/2012*; 8:15 pm	Alcorn State; Cable Car Classic	W 70–58	10–2	Leavey Center (1,530); Santa Clara, CA
12/22/2012*; 8:15 pm	Wagner; Cable Car Classic Championship	W 69–45	11–2	Leavey Center (1,523); Santa Clara, CA
12/29/2012*; 9:00 am, ESPN2	at No. 1 Duke	L 77–90	11–3	Cameron Indoor Stadium (9,314); Durham, NC
01/02/2013; 7:00 pm, ESPNU	San Francisco	W 74–69	12–3 (1–0)	Leavey Center (2,146); Santa Clara, CA
01/05/2013; 5:00 pm, CSNCA/ROOT	No. 10 Gonzaga	L 74–81	12–4 (1–1)	Leavey Center (4,907); Santa Clara, CA
01/10/2013; 7:00 pm, WCC Digital	at Loyola Marymount	L 80–84	12–5 (1–2)	Gersten Pavilion (2,502); Los Angeles, CA
01/12/2013; 1:30 pm, WCC TV	BYU	L 64–82	12–6 (1–3)	Leavey Center (2,853); Santa Clara, CA
01/17/2013; 8:00 pm, CSNCA	at San Francisco	W 85–54	13–6 (2–3)	War Memorial Gym (1,054); San Francisco, CA
01/19/2013; 7:00 pm, WCC Digital	at Pepperdine	W 83–76	14–6 (3–3)	Firestone Fieldhouse (1,191); Malibu, CA
01/23/2013*; 7:00 pm	Cal State Bakersfield	W 66–36	15–6	Leavey Center (1,493); Santa Clara, CA
01/26/2013; 1:00 pm, WCC TV	at San Diego	W 64–50	16–6 (4–3)	Jenny Craig Pavilion (2,415); San Diego, CA
01/31/2013; 7:00 pm, CSNCA	Portland	W 70–46	17–6 (5–3)	Leavey Center (1,121); Santa Clara, CA
02/02/2013; 6:00 pm, BYUtv	at BYU	L 79–96	17–7 (5–4)	Marriott Center (17,228); Provo, UT
02/07/2013; 8:00 pm, ESPN2	Saint Mary's	L 63–84	17–8 (5–5)	Leavey Center (3,303); Santa Clara, CA
02/14/2013; 7:00 pm, WCC Digital	San Diego	W 61–52	18–8 (6–5)	Leavey Center (1,394); Santa Clara, CA
02/16/2013; 7:00 pm, WCC Digital	Pepperdine	W 70–60	19–8 (7–5)	Leavey Center (2,603); Santa Clara, CA
02/20/2013; 8:00 pm, ESPNU	at No. 3 Gonzaga	L 42–85	19–9 (7–6)	McCarthey Athletic Center (6,000); Spokane, WA
02/23/2013; 2:00 pm, WCC TV	at Portland	W 75–63	20–9 (8–6)	Chiles Center (1,713); Portland, OR
02/28/2013; 8:00 pm, CSNCA	Loyola Marymount	W 79–56	21–9 (9–6)	Leavey Center (1,210); Santa Clara, CA
03/02/2013; 7:00 pm, CSNCA	at Saint Mary's	L 67–80	21–10 (9–7)	McKeon Pavilion (3,500); Moraga, CA
2013 West Coast Conference tournament
03/08/2013; 6:30 pm, ESPNU	vs. Loyola Marymount; Quarterfinals	L 58–60	21–11	Orleans Arena (7,896); Las Vegas, NV
2013 College Basketball Invitational
03/19/2013*; 7:00 pm	Vermont; First Round	W 77–67	22–11	Leavey Center (1,011); Santa Clara, CA
03/25/2013*; 4:00 pm, BTN Digital	at Purdue; Quarterfinals	W 86–83	23–11	Mackey Arena (3,629); West Lafayette, IN
03/27/2013*; 6:00 pm, AXS TV	at Wright State; Semifinals	W 81–69	24–11	Nutter Center (3,188); Dayton, OH
04/01/2013*; 7:00 pm, AXS TV	George Mason; Finals Game 1	W 81–73	25–11	Leavey Center (1,154); Santa Clara, CA
04/03/2013*; 4:00 pm, AXS TV	at George Mason; Finals Game 2	L 66–73	25–12	Recreation and Athletic Complex (1,280); Fairfax, VA
04/05/2013*; 4:00 pm, AXS TV	at George Mason; Finals Game 3	W 80–77	26–12	Patriot Center (2,440); Fairfax, VA
*Non-conference game. ^{#}Rankings from AP Poll. (#) Tournament seedings in parentheses. All times are in Pacific Time.
