= 2012–13 San Francisco Dons men's basketball team =

American college basketball season

2012–13 San Francisco Dons men's basketball
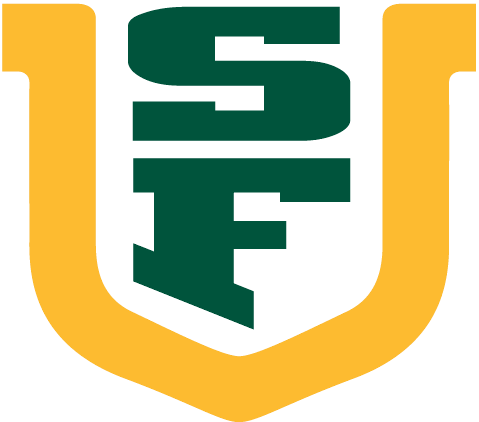
- Conference: West Coast Conference
- Record: 15–16 (7–9 WCC)
- Head coach: Rex Walters (5th season)
- Assistant coaches: Michael Lee; Luke Wicks; Jack Kennedy
- Home arena: War Memorial Gymnasium

2012–13 West Coast Conference men's basketball standings
	Conf.				Overall
Team	W		L	PCT	W		L	PCT
No. 1 Gonzaga†	16	–	0	1.000	32	–	3	.914
Saint Mary's	14	–	2	.875	28	–	7	.800
BYU	10	–	6	.625	24	–	12	.667
Santa Clara	9	–	7	.563	26	–	12	.684
San Francisco	7	–	9	.438	15	–	16	.484
San Diego	7	–	9	.438	16	–	18	.471
Pepperdine	4	–	12	.250	12	–	18	.400
Portland	4	–	12	.250	11	–	21	.344
Loyola Marymount	1	–	15	.063	11	–	23	.324
† Conference tournament winner Rankings from AP poll

The 2012–13 San Francisco Dons men's basketball team represented the University of San Francisco during the 2012–13 college basketball season. This was head coach Rex Walters fifth season at San Francisco. The Dons played their home games at the War Memorial Gymnasium and were members of the West Coast Conference. They finished the season 15–16, 7–9 in WCC play to finish in a tie for fifth place. They lost in the second round of the WCC tournament to Loyola Marymount.

== Before the Season ==
=== Departures ===
Name	Number	Pos.	Height	Weight	Year	Hometown	Notes
Rashad Green	13	G	6'4"	195	Senior	North Babylon, NY	Graduated
Jay Wey	30	G	6'2"	185	Senior	Cupertino, CA	Graduated
Angelo Caloiaro	32	F	6'8"	225	Senior	Saratoga, CA	Graduated
Perris Blackwell	22	F	6'9"	240	Junior	Etiwanda, CA	Transferred to Washington
Michael Williams	5	G	6'0"	170	Junior	Van Nuys, CA	Transferred to Cal State Fullerton
Justin Raffington	11	C	6'9"	225	Sophomore	Bad Kozingen, Germany	Transferred to FAU
Charles Standifer	1	F	6'5"	185	Sophomore	Sacramento, CA	Transferred to Cosumnes River College
Khalil Murphy	15	F	6'7"	235	RS Freshman	Willingboro, NJ	Transferred to LIU- Brooklyn
Avery Johnson	2	G	6'3"	180	Sophomore	Huntington Beach, CA	Transferred to UC Davis

=== Recruits ===
College recruiting information (2012)
Name	Hometown	School	Height	Weight	Commit date
Matt Christiansen; PF	Oklahoma City, OK	Bishop McGuinness	6 ft 9 in (2.06 m)	235 lb (107 kg)	Jun 21, 2011
Matt Christiansen; PF	Recruit ratings: Scout: Rivals: (86)				
Tim Derksen; SG	Tucson, AZ	Amphitheater	6 ft 4 in (1.93 m)	185 lb (84 kg)	Oct 3, 2011
Tim Derksen; SG	Recruit ratings: Scout: Rivals: (87)				
Joe Edmonds; SF	Oklahoma City, Oklahoma	Bishop McGuinness	6 ft 5 in (1.96 m)	200 lb (91 kg)	Jun 21, 2011
Joe Edmonds; SF	Recruit ratings: Scout: Rivals: (83)				
Matt Glover; G	Orange, CA	Penn State	6 ft 5 in (1.96 m)	210 lb (95 kg)	Apr 21, 2012
Matt Glover; G	Recruit ratings: Scout: Rivals: (TR)				
Avry Holmes; PG	Salem, OR	North Salem	5 ft 11 in (1.80 m)	160 lb (73 kg)	Apr 15, 2012
Avry Holmes; PG	Recruit ratings: Scout: Rivals: (83)				
De'End Parker; SG	San Francisco, CA	UCLA	6 ft 6 in (1.98 m)	215 lb (98 kg)	Apr 21, 2012
De'End Parker; SG	Recruit ratings: Scout: Rivals: (TR)				
Frank Rogers; PF	Salinas, CA	Cabrillo	6 ft 8 in (2.03 m)	210 lb (95 kg)	Mar 1, 2012
Frank Rogers; PF	Recruit ratings: Scout: Rivals: (JC)				
Tao Xu; C	Qingdao	The Haverford School	6 ft 11 in (2.11 m)	260 lb (120 kg)	Jun 5, 2012
Tao Xu; C	Recruit ratings: No ratings found				
Overall recruit ranking: Scout: nr Rivals: nr ESPN: nr
Note: In many cases, Scout, Rivals, 247Sports, On3, and ESPN may conflict in their listings of height and weight.; In these cases, the average was taken. ESPN grades are on a 100-point scale.; Sources: "San Francisco Dons 2012 Basketball Commitments". Rivals.; "2012 San Francisco Dons Basketball Commits". Scout.; "ESPN". ESPN.; "Scout.com Team Recruiting Rankings". Scout.; "2012 Team Ranking". Rivals.

== Roster ==
2012–13 San Francisco Dons men's basketball team
Players
Coaches

Pos.	#	Name	Height	Weight	Year	Previous school	Hometown
G	0	Dominique O'Conner	5 ft 10 in (1.78 m)	165 lb (75 kg)	Sr	Westchester	Los Angeles, CA
G	1	Coltin Gelb	6 ft 3 in (1.91 m)	170 lb (77 kg)	Fr	Spanish River	Boca Raton, FL
F	3	Matt Christiansen	6 ft 9 in (2.06 m)	235 lb (107 kg)	Fr	Bishop McGuiness	Oklahoma City, OK
G	5	Matt Glover (redshirt)	6 ft 5 in (1.96 m)	210 lb (95 kg)	Jr	Tustin	Orange, CA
G	10	Chris Adams	6 ft 4 in (1.93 m)	170 lb (77 kg)	So	Damien	Covina, CA
G	30	Evan Scott	6 ft 6 in (1.98 m)	180 lb (82 kg)	Fr	North Kingstown	North Kingstown, RI
G	11	Gavin Hoffmann	6 ft 5 in (1.96 m)	195 lb (88 kg)	So	Lincoln	Portland, OR
G	12	Avry Holmes	6 ft 2 in (1.88 m)	170 lb (77 kg)	Fr	North Salem	Salem, OR
G	13	Joe Edmonds	6 ft 5 in (1.96 m)	195 lb (88 kg)	Fr	Bishop McGuiness	Oklahoma City, OK
C	15	Tao Xu	6 ft 11 in (2.11 m)	260 lb (118 kg)	Fr	The Haverford School	Qingdao, China
G	21	De'End Parker	6 ft 6 in (1.98 m)	215 lb (98 kg)	Jr	Lincoln	San Francisco, CA
F	23	Mark Tollefsen	6 ft 9 in (2.06 m)	215 lb (98 kg)	So	San Ramon Valley	Danville, CA
F	25	Cole Dickerson	6 ft 7 in (2.01 m)	230 lb (104 kg)	Jr	Federal Way	Federal Way, WA
F	31	Frank Rogers	6 ft 9 in (2.06 m)	210 lb (95 kg)	So	Salinas	Salinas, CA
G	32	Tim Derksen	6 ft 3 in (1.91 m)	185 lb (84 kg)	Fr	Amphitheater	Tucson, AZ
G	45	Cody Doolin	6 ft 2 in (1.88 m)	170 lb (77 kg)	Jr	Westlake	Austin, TX

Head coach

- Rex Walters (Kansas)

Assistant coach(es)

- Michael Lee (Kansas)
- Luke Wicks (Northern State)
- Jack Kennedy (Grinnell)

Legend

- (C) Team captain
- (S) Suspended
- (I) Ineligible
- (W) Walk-on
- Injured
- Current redshirt

== Schedule and results ==
The Dons will participate in a 5-day foreign tour in Cancun, Mexico August 12–16. During the tour they will play 3 games against 2 teams from the Liga Nacional de Baloncesto Profesional.

Date time, TV	Opponent	Result	Record	High points	High rebounds	High assists	Site (attendance) city, state
Exhibition Season
08/13/2012*	La Rebotera De Cancún	W		–	–	–	Cancún, Mexico
08/14/2012*	La Rebotera De Cancún	W 96–60		14 – Doolin	–	–	Cancún, Mexico
08/15/2012*	Pioneros de Quintana Roo	W 95–40		20 – Derksen	–	–	Cancún, Mexico
10/27/2012*; 7:00 pm	San Francisco State	W 93–77	–	21 – Dickerson	15 – Dickerson	9 – Doolin	War Memorial Gymnasium (N/A); San Francisco, CA
11/05/2012*; 7:00 pm	UNC Pembroke	W 94–57		24 – Dickerson	10 – Dickerson	3 – Dickerson, Holmes	War Memorial Gymnasium (464); San Francisco, CA
Non-conference Regular Season
11/09/2012*; 8:00 pm, Pac-12	vs. Stanford	L 62–74	0–1	17 – Holmes	19 – Dickerson	3 – Doolin	Oracle Arena (3,200); Oakland, CA
11/13/2012*; 7:00 pm	Cal State East Bay	W 73–58	1–1	18 – Parker	15 – Dickerson	6 – Doolin	War Memorial Gymnasium (942); San Francisco, CA
11/19/2012*; 4:30 pm	at American	W 67–53	2–1	20 – Dickerson	7 – Dickerson	8 – Doolin	Bender Arena (847); Washington, D.C.
11/24/2012*; 7:00 pm	Columbia; Hilltop Challenge	W 79–59	3–1	31 – Parker	14 – Dickerson	4 – Doolin	War Memorial Gymnasium (1,027); San Francisco, CA
11/30/2012*; 7:00 pm	Montana	W 78–68	4–1	19 – Dickerson	20 – Dickerson	7 – Doolin	War Memorial Gymnasium (1,313); San Francisco, CA
12/04/2012*; 7:00 pm, CSNCA/ESPN3	St. John's	W 81–65	5–1	21 – Parker	8 – Dickerson & Derksen	14 – Doolin	War Memorial Gymnasium (2,200); San Francisco, CA
12/08/2012*; 5:00 pm	at Pacific	L 59–67	5–2	14 – Dickerson & Tollefsen	9 – Dickerson	7 – Doolin	Alex G. Spanos Center (1,724); Stockton, CA
12/15/2012*; 3:00 pm	at Nevada	L 51–59	5–3	11 – Dickerson	9 – Dickerson	3 – Doolin	Lawlor Events Center (5,910); Reno, NV
12/18/2012*; 7:00 pm	Holy Cross	L 63–73	5–4	18 – Doolin	17 – Dickerson	5 – Doolin	War Memorial Gymnasium (1,394); San Francisco, CA
12/22/2012*; 3:42 pm, ESPNU	vs. No. 18 San Diego State; Diamond Head Classic 1st Round	L 58–80	5–5	15 – Dickerson	12 – Dickerson	8 – Doolin	Stan Sheriff Center (6,691); Honolulu, HI
12/23/2012*; 12:00 pm, ESPNU	vs. Ole Miss; Diamond Head Classic	L 78–85	5–6	20 – Doolin	7 – Doolin	8 – Doolin	Stan Sheriff Center (6,419); Honolulu, HI
12/25/2012*; 11:00 am, ESPN3	vs. East Tennessee State; Diamond Head Classic 7th Place Game	W 67–49	6–6	19 – Dickerson	9 – Dickerson	6 – Parker	Stan Sheriff Center (N/A); Honolulu, HI
12/29/2012*; 7:00 pm	Dominican	W 93–76	7–6	30 – Dickerson	10 – Dickerson	7 – Parker	War Memorial Gymnasium (1,489); San Francisco, CA
WCC Regular Season
01/02/2013; 7:00 pm, ESPNU	at Santa Clara	L 69–74	7–7 (0–1)	17 – Dickerson	12 – Dickerson	8 – Doolin	Leavey Center (2,146); Santa Clara, CA
01/05/2013; 7:00 pm, BYUtv/CSNCA+	BYU	L 76–80	7–8 (0–2)	22 – Dickerson & Doolin	9 – Dickerson	10 – Doolin	War Memorial Gymnasium (2,123); San Francisco, CA
01/10/2013; 7:00 pm, WCC Digital	San Diego	L 66–70	7–9 (0–3)	19 – Doolin	6 – Derksen	5 – Doolin	War Memorial Gymnasium (1,135); San Francisco, CA
01/12/2013; 8:00 pm, CSNCA	at Saint Mary's	L 72–78	7–10 (0–4)	16 – Doolin	6 – Dickerson & Derksen	3 – Doolin & Holmes	McKeon Pavilion (3,500); Moraga, CA
01/17/2013; 8:00 pm, CSNCA	Santa Clara	L 54–85	7–11 (0–5)	12 – Christiansen	5 – Tollefsen	2 – Adams & Derksen	War Memorial Gymnasium (1,054); San Francisco, CA
01/19/2013; 1:30 pm, WCC TV	Loyola Marymount	W 62–53	8–11 (1–5)	18 – Dickerson	7 – Dickerson	2 – Holmes	War Memorial Gymnasium (1,135); San Francisco, CA
01/24/2013; 7:00 pm, CSNCA+	at Portland	W 75–72	9–11 (2–5)	16 – Parker	4 – Christiansen	7 – Doolin	Chiles Center (1,370); Portland, OR
01/26/2013; 5:00 pm, ROOT	at No. 10 Gonzaga	L 52–66	9–12 (2–6)	9 – Adams	6 – Rogers	3 – Doolin	McCarthey Athletic Center (6,000); Spokane, WA
01/30/2013; 7:00 pm, CSNCA	Saint Mary's	L 63–67	9–13 (2–7)	16 – Doolin	11 – Dickerson	4 – Doolin	War Memorial Gymnasium (3,247); San Francisco, CA
02/02/2013; 2:30 pm, WCC TV	at Pepperdine	W 86–78	10–13 (3–7)	27 – Dickerson	11 – Dickerson	8 – Doolin	Firestone Fieldhouse (1,071); Malibu, CA
02/09/2013; 6:00 pm, BYUtv	at BYU	W 99–87	11–13 (4–7)	23 – Parker	11 – Dickerson	8 – Doolin	Marriott Center (15,477); Provo, UT
02/14/2013; 7:00 pm, WCC Digital	Portland	L 76–78	11–14 (4–8)	17 – Adams & Dickerson	7 – Rogers	6 – Doolin	War Memorial Gymnasium (2,123); San Francisco, CA
02/16/2013; 1:30 pm, WCC TV/ROOT	No. 5 Gonzaga	L 61–71	11–15 (4–9)	15 – Dickerson	5 – Dickerson	6 – Doolin	War Memorial Gymnasium (4,300); San Francisco, CA
02/21/2013; 7:00 pm, WCC Digital	at Loyola Marymount	W 61–59	12–15 (5–9)	16 – Dickerson	5 – Dickerson & Doolin	5 – Holmes	Gersten Pavilion (1,820); Los Angeles, CA
02/23/2013; 6:00 pm, CSNCA	Pepperdine	W 64–58	13–15 (6–9)	18 – Tollefsen	6 – Dickerson, Rogers	4 – Doolin	War Memorial Gymnasium (2,321); San Francisco, CA
02/28/2013; 6:00 pm, CSNCA	at San Diego	W 83–70	14–15 (7–9)	24 – Dickerson	12 – Dickerson	6 – Doolin	Jenny Craig Pavilion (1,731); San Diego, CA
2013 West Coast Conference men's basketball tournament
03/07/2013; 6:00 pm, BYUtv/ WCC Digital	vs. Loyola Marymount; Second Round	L 60–61 ^{OT}	14–16	23 – Dickerson	18 – Dickerson	4 – Doolin	Orleans Arena (7,896); Las Vegas, NV
Non-conference Regular Season
03/14/2013*; 7:00 pm	Northern Kentucky	W 73–68	15–16	22 – Tollefsen	14 – Dickerson	7 – Doolin	War Memorial Gymnasium (1,367); San Francisco, CA
*Non-conference game. ^{#}Rankings from AP Poll. (#) Tournament seedings in parentheses. All times are in Pacific Time.
