= 2013 West Coast Conference men's basketball tournament =

- 2013 WCC Tournament Logo
- Classification: Division I
- Season: 2012–13
- Teams: 9
- Site: Orleans Arena; Paradise, NV
- Finals site: Orleans Arena; Paradise, NV
- Champions: Gonzaga (12th title)
- Winning coach: Mark Few (10th title)
- MVP: Elias Harris (Gonzaga)
- Television: ESPN/ESPN2/ESPNU/BYUtv

2012–13 West Coast Conference men's basketball standings
	Conf.				Overall
Team	W		L	PCT	W		L	PCT
No. 1 Gonzaga†	16	–	0	1.000	32	–	3	.914
Saint Mary's	14	–	2	.875	28	–	7	.800
BYU	10	–	6	.625	24	–	12	.667
Santa Clara	9	–	7	.563	26	–	12	.684
San Francisco	7	–	9	.438	15	–	16	.484
San Diego	7	–	9	.438	16	–	18	.471
Pepperdine	4	–	12	.250	12	–	18	.400
Portland	4	–	12	.250	11	–	21	.344
Loyola Marymount	1	–	15	.063	11	–	23	.324
† Conference tournament winner Rankings from AP poll

The 2013 West Coast Conference men's basketball tournament was held March 6–11, 2013 at the Orleans Arena in the Las Vegas-area community of Paradise, Nevada. Gonzaga, which entered the tournament as the top-ranked team in both major polls, claimed the school's 12th tournament title overall and 10th under current head coach Mark Few.

== Format ==
For the second consecutive year the tournament featured a 9-team single elimination format. The 1 and 2 seeds received a bye to the semifinals while the 3 and 4 seeds received a bye to the quarterfinals. The tournament began on Wednesday, March 6 with an 8/9 game. The second round took place on Thursday, March 7. Both the first and second rounds were shown by BYUtv Sports. The tournament quarterfinals were held on Friday, March 8, and were broadcast on ESPNU. The conference semifinals were held on Saturday, March 9, and aired on ESPN2. The championship game was played on Monday, March 11, 2013, and was broadcast on television by ESPN and on national radio by Dial Global Sports.

== Seeds ==
WCC Tiebreaker procedures are as follows:
1) Head-to-head
2) Better record against a higher seed
3) Higher RPI
In the case of USF and USD, they split the regular season series 1-1. Both were swept by Gonzaga, Saint Mary's, and Santa Clara, and went 1-1 against BYU and 5-1 against seeds lower than them, leading to the rare RPI tiebreaker.

2013 West Coast Conference men's basketball tournament seeds
Seed	School	Conference Record	Overall Record (End of Regular Season)	Tiebreaker
1.	Gonzaga	16-0	29-2	
2.	Saint Mary's	14-2	26-5	
3.	BYU	10-6	21-10	
4.	Santa Clara	9-7	21-10	
5.	San Francisco	7-9	x- 14-15	RPI as of 3/3- 154
6.	San Diego	7-9	14-17	RPI as of 3/3- 174
7.	Pepperdine	4-12	12-17	Pepperdine 2-0 vs. Portland
8.	Portland	4-12	11-20	Portland 0-2 vs. Pepperdine
9.	Loyola Marymount	1-15	8-22	

x- USF's record is the record before the WCC tournament begins. USF has one more non-conference regular season game after the WCC Tournament.

== Schedule ==
Session	Game	Time*	Matchup^{#}
First Round – Wednesday, March 6- BYUtv
1	1	6:00 PM	#8 Portland vs. #9 Loyola Marymount
Second Round – Thursday, March 7- BYUtv
2	2	6:00 PM	#5 San Francisco vs. #9 Loyola Marymount
2	3	8:30 PM	#6 San Diego vs. #7 Pepperdine
Quarterfinals – Friday, March 8- ESPNU
3	4	6:00 PM	#4 Santa Clara vs. #9 Loyola Marymount
3	5	8:30 PM	#3 BYU vs. #6 San Diego
Semifinals – Saturday, March 9- ESPN2
4	6	6:00 PM	#1 Gonzaga vs. #9 Loyola Marymount
4	7	8:30 PM	#2 Saint Mary's vs. #6 San Diego
Championship Game – Monday, March 11- ESPN
5	8	6:00 PM	#1 Gonzaga vs. #2 Saint Mary's
*Game Times in PT. #-Rankings denote tournament seeding.

== Bracket ==
First round Wednesday, March 6 BYUtv
8	Portland	54
9	Loyola Marymount	65

Second round Thursday, March 7 BYUtv
5	San Francisco	60
9	Loyola Marymount	61^{OT}
6	San Diego	62
7	Pepperdine	59

Quarterfinals; Friday, March 8 ESPNU
4	Santa Clara	58
9	Loyola Marymount	60
3	BYU	69
6	San Diego	72

Semifinals; Saturday, March 9 ESPN2
1	#1 Gonzaga	66
9	Loyola Marymount	48
2	Saint Mary's	69
6	San Diego	66^{OT}

Championship; Monday, March 11; ESPN
1	#1 Gonzaga	65
2	Saint Mary's	51

All times listed are Pacific

== Game summaries ==
=== 1st Round: Portland vs. Loyola Marymount ===
Series History: LMU leads series 45-43
Broadcasters: Dave McCann, Blaine Fowler, Steve Cleveland, and Jarom Jordan

BYUtv

Mar 6
6:00 pm PST

Recap

Loyola Marymount Lions 65, Portland Pilots 54
Scoring by half: 34-30, 31-24
Pts: Ashley Hamilton 21; Rebs: Ashley Hamilton 8 Asts: Anthony Ireland 4	Pts: Kevin Bailey 21; Rebs: Ryan Nicholas 9 Asts: Derrick Rodgers 4

Orleans Arena
Las Vegas, NV
Attendance: 7,896
Referees: Mike Greenstein, Michael Irving, Claus Endrissat

=== 2nd Round: San Francisco vs. Loyola Marymount ===
Series History: USF leads series 107-38
Broadcasters: Dave McCann and Blaine Fowler (Play-by-Play) Steve Cleveland and Jarom Jordan (Halftime and Bridge Show)

BYUtv

Mar 7
6:00 pm PST

Recap

Loyola Marymount Lions 61, San Francisco Dons 60 (OT)
Scoring by half: 29-26, 27-30 Overtime: 5-4
Pts: Anthony Ireland 16; Rebs: Ashley Hamilton 14; Asts: Ashley Hamilton & Nick Stover 2	Pts: Cole Dickerson 23; Rebs: Cole Dickerson 18; Asts: Cody Doolin 4

Orleans Arena
Las Vegas, NV
Attendance: 7,896
Referees: Tommy Nunez, Kevin Brill, Greg Nixon

=== 2nd Round: San Diego vs. Pepperdine ===
Series History: Pepperdine leads series 56-39
Broadcasters: Dave McCann and Blaine Fowler (Play-by-Play) Steve Cleveland and Jarom Jordan (Halftime)

BYUtv

Mar 7
8:48 pm PST

Recap

Pepperdine Waves 59, San Diego Toreros 62
Scoring by half: 29-32, 30-30
Pts: Stacy Davis 19; Rebs: Stacy Davis 11; Asts: Lorne Jackson, Jordan Baker, Stacy Davis, & Atif Russell 2	Pts: Johnny Dee 16; Rebs: Chris Manresa 11; Asts: Chrs Anderson 5

Orleans Arena
Las Vegas, NV
Attendance: 7,896
Referees: Ken Ditty, Deron White, Horace Shields

=== Quarterfinals: Santa Clara vs. Loyola Marymount ===
Series History: Santa Clara leads series 84-55
Broadcasters: Dave Flemming and Sean Farnham

ESPNU

Mar 8
6:00 pm PST

Recap

Loyola Marymount Lions 60, Santa Clara Broncos 58
Scoring by half: 34-34, 26-24
Pts: Anthony Ireland 23; Rebs: Alex Osborne 11; Asts: Anthony Ireland 3	Pts: Kevin Foster 23; Rebs: Marc Trasolini & John McArthur 6 Asts: Brandon Clark 3

Orleans Arena
Las Vegas, NV
Attendance: 7,896
Referees: Michael Reed, Daryl Gelinas, Mike Scyphers

=== Quarterfinals: BYU vs. San Diego ===
BYU leads series 5-1
Broadcasters: Dave Flemming and Sean Farnham

ESPNU

Mar 8
9:40 pm MST

Recap

San Diego Toreros 72, BYU Cougars 69
Scoring by half: 35-28, 37-41
Pts: Johnny Dee 25; Rebs: Chris Manresa 10; Asts: Chris Anderson 6	Pts: Brandon Davies & Tyler Haws 20; Rebs: Brandon Davies 9 Asts: Brandon Davies 8

Orleans Arena
Las Vegas, NV
Attendance: 7,896
Referees: Tony Padilla, Richard Batsell, James Giron

=== Semifinal: #1 Gonzaga vs. Loyola Marymount ===
Series History: Gonzaga leads series 57-23
Broadcasters: Dave Flemming and Sean Farnham

ESPN2

Mar 9
6:00 pm PST

Recap

Loyola Marymount Lions 48, #1 Gonzaga Bulldogs 66
Scoring by half: 26-27, 22-39
Pts: Anthony Ireland 19; Rebs: Nick Stover 7 Asts: Anthony Ireland & Bruce English 2	Pts: Elias Harris 21; Rebs: Kelly Olynyk & Elias Harris 8 Asts: Kelly Olynyk & David Stockton 4

Orleans Arena
Las Vegas, NV
Attendance: 7,896
Referees: Ken Ditty, Deron White, Horace Shields

=== Semifinal: Saint Mary's vs. San Diego ===
Series History: Saint Mary's leads series 40-35
Broadcasters: Dave Flemming and Sean Farnham

ESPN2

Mar 9
9:30 pm PST

Recap

San Diego Toreros 66, Saint Mary's Gaels 69 (OT)
Scoring by half: 29-26, 33-36 Overtime: 4-7
Pts: Johnny Dee 18; Rebs: Chris Manresa 13; Asts: Chris Anderson 9	Pts: Brad Waldow 23; Rebs: Brad Waldow 16; Asts: Matthew Dellavedova 12

Orleans Arena
Las Vegas, NV
Attendance: 7,896
Referees: Frank Harvey, Kevin Brill, Glen Mayberry

=== Championship: Gonzaga vs. Saint Mary's ===
Series History: Gonzaga leads series 57-27
Broadcasters: Dave Flemming and Sean Farnham (ESPN)/ Ted Robinson and Steve Lappas (Dial Global)

ESPN

Mar 11
6:00 pm PST

#1 Gonzaga Bulldogs 65, Saint Mary's Gaels 51
Scoring by half: 38-29, 27-22
Pts: Kelly Olynyk 21; Rebs: Kelly Olynyk 12; Asts: Kevin Pangos, Elias Harris, & David Stockton 3	Pts: Stephen Holt 19; Rebs: Stephen Holt 7 Asts: Matthew Dellavedova 7

Orleans Arena
Las Vegas, NV
Attendance: 7,896
Referees: Mike Greenstein, Mike Reed, Michael Irving

== All-tournament team ==
Tournament MVP in bold.

Name	School	Pos.	Year	Ht.	Hometown
**Elias Harris**	Gonzaga	F	Senior	6-8	Speyer, Germany
Johnny Dee	San Diego	SG	Sophomore	6-0	Vista, California
Anthony Ireland	Loyola Marymount	PG	Junior	5-10	Waterbury, Connecticut
Kelly Olynyk	Gonzaga	F/C	Junior	7-0	Kamloops, British Columbia
Brad Waldow	Saint Mary's	F	Sophomore	6-9	Shingle Springs, California

== See also ==
- 2012-13 NCAA Division I men's basketball season
- West Coast Conference men's basketball tournament
- 2012–13 West Coast Conference men's basketball season
- West Coast Conference women's basketball tournament
- 2013 West Coast Conference women's basketball tournament
