= 2012–13 Loyola Marymount Lions men's basketball team =

American college basketball season

2012–13 Loyola Marymount Lions men's basketball
- Conference: West Coast Conference
- Record: 11–23 (1–15 WCC)
- Head coach: Max Good (5th season)
- Assistant coaches: Myke Scholl; Jason Levy; Chris Farr
- Home arena: Gersten Pavilion

2012–13 West Coast Conference men's basketball standings
	Conf.				Overall
Team	W		L	PCT	W		L	PCT
No. 1 Gonzaga†	16	–	0	1.000	32	–	3	.914
Saint Mary's	14	–	2	.875	28	–	7	.800
BYU	10	–	6	.625	24	–	12	.667
Santa Clara	9	–	7	.563	26	–	12	.684
San Francisco	7	–	9	.438	15	–	16	.484
San Diego	7	–	9	.438	16	–	18	.471
Pepperdine	4	–	12	.250	12	–	18	.400
Portland	4	–	12	.250	11	–	21	.344
Loyola Marymount	1	–	15	.063	11	–	23	.324
† Conference tournament winner Rankings from AP poll

The 2012–13 Loyola Marymount Lions men's basketball team represented Loyola Marymount University during the 2012–13. This was head coach Max Good's fifth season at Loyola Marymount. The Lions competed in the West Coast Conference and played their home games at Gersten Pavilion. They finished the season 11–23, 1–15 in WCC play to finish in last place. Despite only winning only one conference game during the regular season, they won three games during the WCC tournament to advance to the semifinals where they lost to #1 Gonzaga.

== Before the season ==
=== Departures ===
Name	Number	Pos.	Height	Weight	Year	Hometown	Notes
LaRon Armstead	12	F	6'5"	200	Senior	Los Angeles, CA	Graduated
Kelsey Chine	23	G	6'5"	190	Senior	Los Angeles, CA	Dismissed from team
Tim Diederichs	32	F	6'9"	225	RS Senior	Seattle, WA	Graduated
Jared DuBois	4	G	6'3"	180	RS Junior	Los Angeles, CA	Graduated- Transferred for Graduate School to Utah
Daniel Latimer	13	G	6'0"	170	RS Junior	Pori, Finland	Graduated
Drew Viney	34	F	6'8"	210	RS Senior	Villa Park, CA	Graduated

=== Recruits ===
College recruiting information (2012)
Name	Hometown	School	Height	Weight	Commit date
Taj Adams; F	Los Angeles, CA	Fairfax	6 ft 6 in (1.98 m)	170 lb (77 kg)	Nov 11, 2011
Taj Adams; F	Recruit ratings: Scout: Rivals: (82)				
Nicholas Stover; F	Los Angeles, CA	Windward School	6 ft 5 in (1.96 m)	200 lb (91 kg)	Nov 11, 2011
Nicholas Stover; F	Recruit ratings: Scout: Rivals: (JC)				
Tobe Okafor; C	Durham, NC	Maine Central Institute	6 ft 11 in (2.11 m)	230 lb (100 kg)	Nov 11, 2011
Tobe Okafor; C	Recruit ratings: Scout: Rivals: (86)				
Chase Flint; PF	Price, UT	College of Eastern Utah	6 ft 1 in (1.85 m)	178 lb (81 kg)	May 2, 2012
Chase Flint; PF	Recruit ratings: Scout: Rivals: (NR)				
Ben Dickinson; F	Alexandria, VA	Binghamton	6 ft 9 in (2.06 m)	230 lb (100 kg)	May 7, 2012
Ben Dickinson; F	Recruit ratings: Scout: Rivals: (TR)				
Overall recruit ranking: Scout: nr Rivals: nr ESPN: nr
Note: In many cases, Scout, Rivals, 247Sports, On3, and ESPN may conflict in their listings of height and weight.; In these cases, the average was taken. ESPN grades are on a 100-point scale.; Sources: "Loyola Marymount Lions 2012 Basketball Commitments". Rivals.; "2012 Loyola Marymount Lions Basketball Commits". Scout.; "ESPN 2012 Loyola Marymount Lions Basketball recruits". ESPN.; "Scout.com Team Recruiting Rankings". Scout.; "2012 Team Ranking". Rivals.

Dickinson will redshirt the 2012-13 season and begin play in the 2013-14 season as is required for a D1 Transfer by the NCAA.

== Roster ==
2012–13 Loyola Marymount Lions men's basketball team
Players
Coaches

Pos.	#	Name	Height	Weight	Year	Previous school	Hometown
G	0	Taylor Walker	6 ft 1 in (1.85 m)	180 lb (82 kg)	RS Sr	Fullerton JC	Inglewood, CA
G	1	Bruce English	6 ft 1 in (1.85 m)	190 lb (86 kg)	So	Lutheran	La Verne, CA
F	2	C. J. Blackwell	6 ft 5 in (1.96 m)	240 lb (109 kg)	So	Taft	Los Angeles, CA
G	3	Anthony Ireland	5 ft 10 in (1.78 m)	170 lb (77 kg)	Jr	Winchedon School	Waterbury, CT
F	5	Ashley Hamilton	6 ft 7 in (2.01 m)	210 lb (95 kg)	RS Sr	Lawrence Academy	London, England
F	10	Taj Adams	6 ft 7 in (2.01 m)	180 lb (82 kg)	Fr	Fairfax	Los Angeles, CA
F	11	Nick Stover	6 ft 6 in (1.98 m)	200 lb (91 kg)	Fr	Windward	Los Angeles, CA
F	14	Ben Dickinson (redshirt)	6 ft 9 in (2.06 m)	230 lb (104 kg)	So	Binghamton	Alexandria, VA
F	15	Alex Osborne	6 ft 7 in (2.01 m)	240 lb (109 kg)	RS Jr	Pacific Hills	Los Angeles, CA
F	22	Godwin Okonji	6 ft 8 in (2.03 m)	220 lb (100 kg)	Jr	Findlay College Prep	Legos, Nigeria
G	23	Chase Flint	6 ft 1 in (1.85 m)	180 lb (82 kg)	So	Eastern Utah	Kaysville, UT
G	24	Ayodeji Egbeyemi	6 ft 4 in (1.93 m)	205 lb (93 kg)	Jr	National Christian Academy	Fort Washington, MD

Head coach

- Max Good (Eastern Kentucky)

Assistant coach(es)

- Myke School (Maryland)
- Chris Farr (Cal State East Bay)

Legend

- (C) Team captain
- (S) Suspended
- (I) Ineligible
- (W) Walk-on
- Injured
- Current redshirt

== Schedule and results ==
Date time, TV	Opponent	Result	Record	Site (attendance) city, state
Exhibition
10/30/2012*; 7:00 pm	Point Loma Nazarene	W 72–52	-	Gersten Pavilion (1,152); Los Angeles, CA
Regular season
11/09/2012*; 7:00 pm	Pacifica	W 108–49	1–0	Gersten Pavilion (2,062); Los Angeles, CA
11/11/2012*; 4:00 pm	at SMU	L 58–73	1–1	Moody Coliseum (3,578); University Park, TX
11/17/2012*; 7:00 pm	at Cal State Bakersfield	W 76–73	2–1	Icardo Center (1,093); Bakersfield, CA
11/22/2012*; 6:00 pm, CBSSN	vs. Oral Roberts; Great Alaska Shootout First Round	L 66–75	2–2	Sullivan Arena (4,141); Anchorage, AK
11/23/2012*; 4:00 pm	vs. Texas State; Great Alaska Shootout Consolation Game	W 78–63	3–2	Sullivan Arena (4,168); Anchorage, AK
11/24/2012*; 3:00 pm	at Alaska Anchorage; Great Alaska Shootout 5th Place Game	L 77–83	3–3	Sullivan Arena (4,389); Anchorage, AK
11/29/2012*; 7:00 pm	Long Beach State	L 70–73	3–4	Gersten Pavilion (2,239); Los Angeles, CA
12/01/2012*; 5:00 pm	Portland State	W 66–56	4–4	Gersten Pavilion (2,592); Los Angeles, CA
12/05/2012*; 5:30 pm, FS West	at Northern Arizona	W 92–86 ^{OT}	5–4	Walkup Skydome (1,245); Flagstaff, AZ
12/19/2012*; 8:00 pm, ESPNU	Ole Miss	L 70–73	5–5	Gersten Pavilion (3,021); Los Angeles, CA
12/22/2012*; 12:30 pm, FSMW	at Saint Louis	L 44–65	5–6	Chaifetz Arena (5,804); St. Louis, MO
12/27/2012*; 7:00 pm	Morgan State	W 79–62	6–6	Gersten Pavilion (1,220); Los Angeles, CA
12/29/2012*; 7:00 pm	Cal State Bakersfield	W 73–66	7–6	Gersten Pavilion (1,018); Los Angeles, CA
01/03/2013; 6:00 pm, BYUtv	at BYU	L 51–92	7–7 (0–1)	Marriott Center (18,160); Provo, UT
01/05/2013; 1:30 pm, WCC TV	at Saint Mary's	L 61–74	7–8 (0–2)	McKeon Pavilion (2,593); Moraga, CA
01/10/2013; 7:00 pm, WCC Digital	Santa Clara	W 84–80	8–8 (1–2)	Gersten Pavilion (2,502); Los Angeles, CA
01/12/2013; 7:00 pm, WCC Digital	Portland	L 64–68	8–9 (1–3)	Gersten Pavilion (1,612); Los Angeles, CA
01/16/2013; 7:00 pm, TWCSN	at San Diego	L 70–78	8–10 (1–4)	Jenny Craig Pavilion (3,079); San Diego, CA
01/19/2013; 1:30 pm, WCC TV	at San Francisco	L 53–62	8–11 (1–5)	War Memorial Gymnasium (1,135); San Francisco, CA
01/24/2013; 6:00 pm, TWCSN	Pepperdine	L 57–60	8–12 (1–6)	Gersten Pavilion (3,130); Los Angeles, CA
01/31/2013; 8:00 pm, ESPN2	No. 7 Gonzaga	L 43–88	8–13 (1–7)	Gersten Pavilion (3,952); Los Angeles, CA
02/04/2013; 7:00 pm, TWCSN	San Diego	L 68–69 ^{OT}	8–14 (1–8)	Gersten Pavilion (1,069); Los Angeles, CA
02/07/2013; 7:00 pm, CSNBA	at Portland	L 60–69	8–15 (1–9)	Chiles Center (1,375); Portland, OR
02/09/2013; 5:00 pm, TWCSN/ROOT	at No. 6 Gonzaga	L 55–74	8–16 (1–10)	McCarthey Athletic Center (6,000); Spokane, WA
02/14/2013; 7:00 pm, WCC Digital	at Pepperdine	L 50–52	8–17 (1–11)	Firestone Fieldhouse (1,138); Malibu, CA
02/16/2013; 4:00 pm, TWCSN	Saint Mary's	L 50–61	8–18 (1–12)	Gersten Pavilion (3,121); Los Angeles, CA
02/21/2013; 7:00 pm, WCC Digital	San Francisco	L 59–61	8–19 (1–13)	Gersten Pavilion (1,820); Los Angeles, CA
02/23/2013*; 7:00 pm	at Cal Poly; BracketBusters	L 60–63	8–20	Mott Gym (2,150); San Luis Obispo, CA
02/28/2013; 8:00 pm, TWCSN	at Santa Clara	L 56–79	8–21 (1–14)	Leavey Center (1,210); Santa Clara, CA
03/02/2013; 8:00 pm, ESPNU	BYU	L 70–73	8–22 (1–15)	Gersten Pavilion (1,911); Los Angeles, CA
2013 West Coast Conference men's basketball tournament
03/06/2013; 6:00 pm, BYUtv/ WCC Digital	vs. Portland; First Round	W 65–54	9–22	Orleans Arena (7,896); Las Vegas, NV
03/07/2013; 6:00 pm, BYUtv/ WCC Digital	vs. San Francisco; Second Round	W 61–60 ^{OT}	10–22	Orleans Arena (7,896); Las Vegas, NV
03/08/2013; 6:30 pm, ESPNU	vs. Santa Clara; Quarterfinals	W 60–58	11–22	Orleans Arena (7,896); Las Vegas, NV
03/09/2013; 6:00 pm, ESPN2	vs. No. 1 Gonzaga; Semifinals	L 48–66	11–23	Orleans Arena (7,896); Las Vegas, NV
*Non-conference game. ^{#}Rankings from AP Poll. (#) Tournament seedings in parentheses.
