= 2012–13 Portland Pilots men's basketball team =

American college basketball season

2012–13 Portland Pilots men's basketball
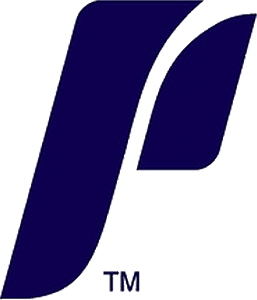
- Conference: West Coast Conference
- Record: 11–21 (4–12 WCC)
- Head coach: Eric Reveno (7th season)
- Assistant coaches: Eric Jackson; Michael Wolf; Colin Pfaff
- Home arena: Chiles Center

2012–13 West Coast Conference men's basketball standings
	Conf.				Overall
Team	W		L	PCT	W		L	PCT
No. 1 Gonzaga†	16	–	0	1.000	32	–	3	.914
Saint Mary's	14	–	2	.875	28	–	7	.800
BYU	10	–	6	.625	24	–	12	.667
Santa Clara	9	–	7	.563	26	–	12	.684
San Francisco	7	–	9	.438	15	–	16	.484
San Diego	7	–	9	.438	16	–	18	.471
Pepperdine	4	–	12	.250	12	–	18	.400
Portland	4	–	12	.250	11	–	21	.344
Loyola Marymount	1	–	15	.063	11	–	23	.324
† Conference tournament winner Rankings from AP poll

The 2012–13 Portland Pilots men's basketball team represented the University of Portland during the 2012–13 NCAA Division I men's basketball season. The Pilots were members of the West Coast Conference and were led by seventh-year head coach Eric Reveno. They played their home games at the Chiles Center. They finished the season 11–21, 4–12 in WCC play to finish in a tie for seventh place. They lost in the first round of the WCC tournament to Loyola Marymount.

== Before the Season ==
=== Departures ===
Name	Number	Pos.	Height	Weight	Year	Hometown	Notes
Eric Waterford	1	G	6'1"	180	Senior	Modesto, CA	Graduated
Tim Douglas	11	G	5'10"	160	Sophomore	Cerritos, CA	Transferred - Portland State University
Nemanja Mitrovic	33	G	6'5"	200	Senior	Toronto, Ontario	Graduated

=== Recruitment ===
College recruiting information
Name	Hometown	School	Height	Weight	Commit date
Jake Ehlers; F	Corvallis, OR	Corvallis	6 ft 7 in (2.01 m)	200 lb (91 kg)	Nov 9, 2011
Jake Ehlers; F	Recruit ratings: Scout: Rivals: (87)				
Bryce Pressley; F	Sacramento, CA	Jesuit	6 ft 3 in (1.91 m)	180 lb (82 kg)	Apr 23, 2012
Bryce Pressley; F	Recruit ratings: Scout: Rivals: (74)				
Oskars Reinfelds; G	Riga	Oakley College	6 ft 4 in (1.93 m)	205 lb (93 kg)	May 21, 2012
Oskars Reinfelds; G	Recruit ratings: Scout: Rivals: (NR)				
David Ahern; G	Novato, CA	Marin Catholic	6 ft 0 in (1.83 m)	180 lb (82 kg)	May 22, 2012
David Ahern; G	Recruit ratings: Scout: Rivals: (NR)				
Overall recruit ranking: Scout: nr Rivals: nr ESPN: nr
Note: In many cases, Scout, Rivals, 247Sports, On3, and ESPN may conflict in their listings of height and weight.; In these cases, the average was taken. ESPN grades are on a 100-point scale.; Sources: "Portland Pilots 2012 Basketball Commitments". Rivals.; "2012 Portland Pilots Basketball Commits". Scout.; "ESPN 2012 Portland Pilots Basketball recruits". ESPN.; "Scout.com Team Recruiting Rankings". Scout.; "2012 Team Ranking". Rivals.

== Roster ==
2012–13 Portland Pilots men's basketball team
Players
Coaches

Pos.	#	Name	Height	Weight	Year	Previous school	Hometown
G	0	Kevin Bailey	6 ft 5 in (1.96 m)	190 lb (86 kg)	So	East Clovis	Clovis, CA
G	1	Bryce Pressley	6 ft 4 in (1.93 m)	190 lb (86 kg)	Fr	Jesuit	Sacramento, CA
G	3	Tanner Riley	6 ft 3 in (1.91 m)	200 lb (91 kg)	Jr	Mount Si	North Bend, WA
F	5	John Bailey	6 ft 8 in (2.03 m)	210 lb (95 kg)	RS So	Dobson	Mesa, AZ
G	10	Taylor Mossman	6 ft 2 in (1.88 m)	185 lb (84 kg)	Jr	Canyon	Anaheim, CA
F	11	Jake Ehlers	6 ft 7 in (2.01 m)	200 lb (91 kg)	Fr	Corvallis	Corvallis, OR
C	12	Thomas van der Mars	6 ft 11 in (2.11 m)	225 lb (102 kg)	So	Erasmus U Canarias Basketball Academy	Gouda, Netherlands
C	14	Riley Barker	6 ft 10 in (2.08 m)	225 lb (102 kg)	Jr	White Rock Christian Academy	Surrey, BC, Canada
G	15	Derek Rodgers	6 ft 1 in (1.85 m)	210 lb (95 kg)	Sr	Los Osos; Citrus College	Rancho Cucamonga, CA
G	21	Korey Thieleke	6 ft 3 in (1.91 m)	170 lb (77 kg)	Jr	West	Bakersfield, CA
F	22	Dorian Cason	6 ft 7 in (2.01 m)	210 lb (95 kg)	So	Summit	Fontana, CA
G	25	David Ahern	6 ft 0 in (1.83 m)	180 lb (82 kg)	Fr	Marin Catholic	Novato, CA
F	32	Ryan Nicholas	6 ft 7 in (2.01 m)	235 lb (107 kg)	Jr	Gonzaga Prep	Spokane, WA
G	35	David Carr	6 ft 3 in (1.91 m)	170 lb (77 kg)	So	Central Catholic	Portland, OR
G	45	Oskars Reinfelds	6 ft 4 in (1.93 m)	205 lb (93 kg)	Fr	Oakley College	Riga, Latvia

Head coach

- Eric Reveno (Stanford)

Assistant coach(es)

- Eric Jackson (Green Bay)
- Michael Wolf (Stanford)
- Colin Pfaff (Cal State Monterey Bay)

Legend

- (C) Team captain
- (S) Suspended
- (I) Ineligible
- (W) Walk-on
- Injured
- Current redshirt

== Schedule ==
Date time, TV	Rank^{#}	Opponent^{#}	Result	Record	Site (attendance) city, state
Exhibition
10/27/2012*; 7:00 pm		Concordia-Portland	W 87–69		Chiles Center (1,092); Portland, OR
11/03/2012*; 4:00 pm		Concordia-Irvine	W 79–66		Chiles Center (1,010); Portland, OR
Regular season
11/10/2012*; 11:00 am		at Ohio	L 52–81	0–1	Convocation Center (12,194); Athens, OH
11/15/2012*; 7:00 pm		Idaho State	W 51–48	1–1	Chiles Center (1,216); Portland, OR
11/18/2012*; 12:00 pm		at Montana State	L 64–83	1–2	Breeden Fieldhouse (1,632); Bozeman, MT
11/21/2012*; 7:00 pm		Portland State	W 81–60	2–2	Chiles Center (1,224); Portland, OR
11/25/2012*; 5:00 pm, RTNW		at New Mexico	L 54–69	2–3	The Pit (13,487); Albuquerque, NM
11/27/2012*; 7:30 pm		Lewis & Clark	W 78–73	3–3	Chiles Center (1,037); Portland, OR
12/01/2012*; 7:30 pm, Pac-12		at Washington State	L 60–72	3–4	Beasley Coliseum (4,513); Pullman, WA
12/04/2012*; 8:00 pm, ESPNU		No. 21 UNLV	L 60–68	3–5	Chiles Center (3,057); Portland, OR
12/08/2012*; 9:00 am, ESPN2		at Kentucky	L 46–74	3–6	Rupp Arena (22,285); Lexington, KY
12/14/2012*; 7:30 pm		Portland Bible	W 95–66	4–6	Chiles Center (1,020); Portland, OR
12/17/2012*; 7:00 pm		Cal State Bakersfield; Las Vegas Classic	W 69–51	5–6	Chiles Center (1,018); Portland, OR
12/19/2012*; 7:00 pm		North Florida; Las Vegas Classic	W 74–64	6–6	Chiles Center (1,003); Portland, OR
12/22/2012*; 7:45 pm		vs. Colorado State; Las Vegas Classic Semifinals	L 53–70	6–7	Orleans Arena (N/A); Paradise, NV
12/23/2012*; 6:00 pm, CBSSN		vs. Bradley; Las Vegas Classic Consolation Game	W 57–55	7–7	Orleans Arena (N/A); Paradise, NV
12/29/2012*; 7:30 pm		Texas–Pan American	L 52–56	7–8	Chiles Center (1,296); Portland, OR
01/03/2013; 8:00 pm, CSNNW		at San Diego	L 50–61	7–9 (0–1)	Jenny Craig Pavilion (1,851); San Diego, CA
01/05/2013; 7:00 pm, WCC Digital		at Pepperdine	L 47–54	7–10 (0–2)	Firestone Fieldhouse (892); Malibu, CA
01/12/2013; 7:00 pm, WCC Digital		at Loyola Marymount	W 68–64	8–10 (1–2)	Gersten Pavilion (1,612); Los Angeles, CA
01/17/2013; 7:00 pm, RTNW		No. 8 Gonzaga	L 49–71	8–11 (1–3)	Chiles Center (4,852); Portland, OR
01/19/2013; 7:30 pm, RTNW		Saint Mary's	L 38–60	8–12 (1–4)	Chiles Center (2,625); Portland, OR
01/24/2013; 7:00 pm, CSNNW		San Francisco	L 72–75	8–13 (1–5)	Chiles Center (1,370); Portland, OR
01/26/2013; 7:30 pm, ESPNU		BYU	L 67–85	8–14 (1–6)	Chiles Center (3,078); Portland, OR
01/31/2013; 7:00 pm, CSNNW		at Santa Clara	L 46–70	8–15 (1–7)	Leavey Center (1,121); Santa Clara, CA
02/02/2013; 4:30 pm, RTNW		at Saint Mary's	L 42–77	8–16 (1–8)	McKeon Pavilion (3,308); Moraga, CA
02/07/2013; 7:00 pm, CSNNW		Loyola Marymount	W 69–60	9–16 (2–8)	Chiles Center (1,375); Portland, OR
02/09/2013; 1:00 pm, TWCSN		Pepperdine	L 68–72 ^{OT}	9–17 (2–9)	Chiles Center (1,565); Portland, OR
02/14/2013; 7:00 pm, WCC Digital		at San Francisco	W 78–76	10–17 (3–9)	War Memorial Gymnasium (2,123); San Francisco, CA
02/16/2013; 6:00 pm, BYUtv		at BYU	L 72–86	10–18 (3–10)	Marriott Center (17,009); Provo, UT
02/21/2013; 7:00 pm, RTNW		San Diego	W 70–67	11–18 (4–10)	Chiles Center (1,332); Portland, OR
02/23/2013; 2:00 pm, TWCSN		Santa Clara	L 63–75	11–19 (4–11)	Chiles Center (1,713); Portland, OR
03/02/2013; 2:00 pm, TWCSN		at No. 2 Gonzaga	L 52–81	11–20 (4–12)	McCarthey Athletic Center (6,000); Spokane, WA
2013 West Coast Conference men's basketball tournament
03/06/2013; 6:00 pm, BYUtv	(8)	vs. (9) Loyola Marymount; First Round	L 54–65	11–21	Orleans Arena (7,896); Paradise, NV
*Non-conference game. ^{#}Rankings from AP Poll. (#) Tournament seedings in parentheses. All times are in Pacific Time.
