= 2012–13 Gonzaga Bulldogs men's basketball team =

American college basketball season

2012–13 Gonzaga Bulldogs men's basketball

WCC tournament champions WCC regular season champions Old Spice Classic champions

NCAA tournament, Round of 32
- Conference: West Coast Conference

Ranking
- Coaches: No. 12
- AP: No. 1
- Record: 32–3 (16–0 WCC)
- Head coach: Mark Few (14th season)
- Assistant coaches: Tommy Lloyd (12th season); Ray Giacoletti (6th season); Donny Daniels (3rd season)
- Home arena: McCarthey Athletic Center

2012–13 West Coast Conference men's basketball standings
| | Conf. | | | | Overall |
| Team | W | | L | PCT | W | | L | PCT |
|---|---|---|---|---|---|---|---|---|
| No. 1 Gonzaga† | 16 | – | 0 | 1.000 | 32 | – | 3 | .914 |
| Saint Mary's | 14 | – | 2 | .875 | 28 | – | 7 | .800 |
| BYU | 10 | – | 6 | .625 | 24 | – | 12 | .667 |
| Santa Clara | 9 | – | 7 | .563 | 26 | – | 12 | .684 |
| San Francisco | 7 | – | 9 | .438 | 15 | – | 16 | .484 |
| San Diego | 7 | – | 9 | .438 | 16 | – | 18 | .471 |
| Pepperdine | 4 | – | 12 | .250 | 12 | – | 18 | .400 |
| Portland | 4 | – | 12 | .250 | 11 | – | 21 | .344 |
| Loyola Marymount | 1 | – | 15 | .063 | 11 | – | 23 | .324 |
† Conference tournament winner Rankings from AP poll

The 2012–13 Gonzaga Bulldogs men's basketball team represented Gonzaga University in the 2012–13 NCAA Division I men's basketball season. The team played their home games at the McCarthey Athletic Center, which has a capacity of 6,000. The Bulldogs (also informally referred to as the Zags), were in their 33rd season as a member of the West Coast Conference, and were led by head coach Mark Few, who was in his 14th season as head coach. In the previous season, the Zags gained a record of 26–7 and reached the third round of the 2012 NCAA tournament.

On March 4, 2013, Gonzaga was the top-ranked team in the nation for the first time in school history. The Bulldogs were the fifth team to be ranked number one during the 2013 season.

== Preseason ==
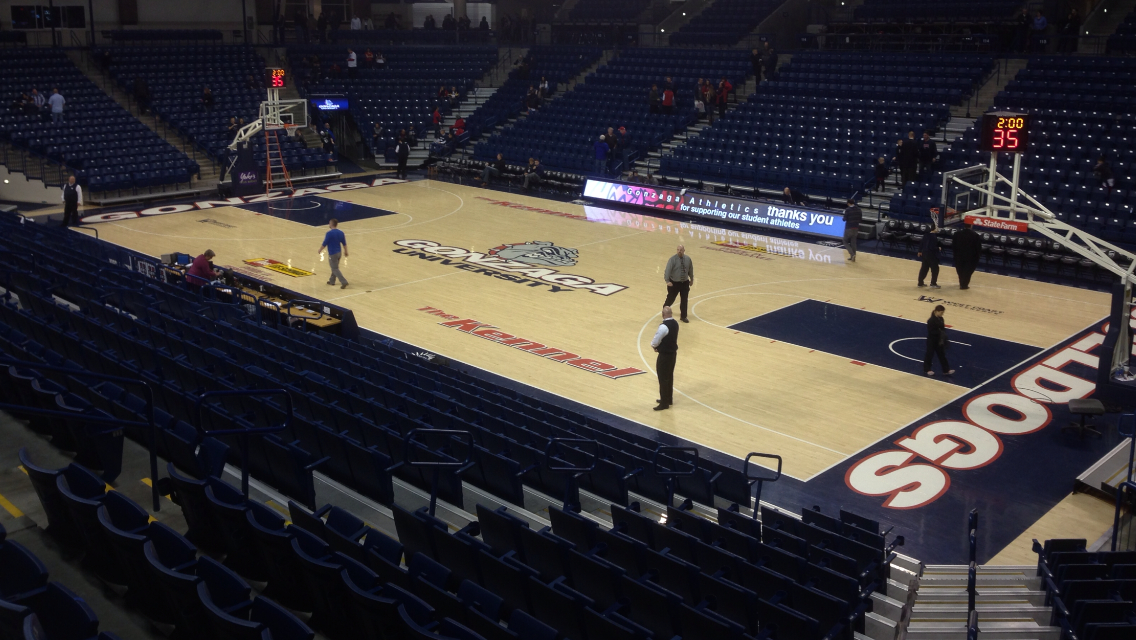
Gonzaga played their home games at the McCarthey Athletic Center in Spokane

In 2012–13, the Gonzaga Bulldogs men's basketball team were in their 33rd season as a member of the West Coast Conference. Since 2004, the team has played their home games at the McCarthey Athletic Center, which has a capacity of 6,000. In their previous season, a West Coast Conference Preseason Poll predicted that the Gonzaga Bulldogs would finish atop of the conference. Despite the high expectations, the Zags finished second place behind Saint Mary's in the West Coast Conference Standings with a 13–3 conference record, causing its eleven-year run as regular season champions to come to an end. The Bulldogs lost in the championship game of the West Coast Conference tournament to Saint Mary's, who claimed their second tournament title in three years. The team drew a seven seed in the 2012 NCAA tournament, where they lost to two seed Ohio State in the third round, 73–66, and finished with a record of 26–7.

Before the 2012–13 season, the Gonzaga Bulldogs men's basketball team lost two seniors from the previous year to graduation: starter Robert Sacre and transfer Marquise Carter. Sacre was the team's third-highest scorer, with an average of 11.6 points per game, and averages of 6.3 rebounds and 1.4 blocks per game. In his final season, he was selected for the all-conference team and finished his career with 1,270 points, 679 rebounds, and 186 blocks. He would go on to be selected by the Los Angeles Lakers as the 60th overall pick in the second round of the 2012 NBA draft. Carter was a guard off of the bench, and averaged 3.8 points, 1.5 rebounds, and 1.7 assists per game.

Four players left Gonzaga voluntarily: freshmen Chris Sarbaugh and Ryan Spangler, as well as sophomores Mathis Mönninghoff and Mathis Keita. Sarbaugh redshirted in 2011–12 after coming out of high school from Gonzaga Prep, and transferred to North Idaho College. Spangler played in 22 games and averaged 6.6 minutes per game before transferring to Oklahoma. Mönninghoff was a reserve wing for the Zags and played an average of about six minutes per game before he left to play professionally in Germany. Keita played in 23 games, averaging 9.4 minutes and 2.7 points per game before he transferred to Indiana University of Pennsylvania the following season.

On October 29, 2012, the Bulldogs were voted by other West Coast Conference coaches as the preseason favorite to win the league, receiving seven of the nine votes. Sophomore guards Gary Bell Jr. and Kevin Pangos were selected for the All-Conference Team, as well as junior center Sam Dower and senior forward Elias Harris. Harris and Pangos were listed on the preseason Naismith Award 50-man watchlist, while Harris was also listed on the Wooden Award preseason top 50 list.

=== Departures ===
| Name | Number | Pos. | Height | Weight | Year | Hometown | Reason for departure |
|---|---|---|---|---|---|---|---|
| Robert Sacre | 00 | C | 7'0" | 260 | Senior (Redshirt) | North Vancouver, BC | Graduated; declared for 2012 NBA draft; selected 60th overall by the Los Angeles Lakers |
| Marquise Carter | 2 | G | 6'4" | 178 | Senior (Redshirt) | San Diego, CA | Graduated |
| Mathis Keita | 25 | G | 6'5" | 190 | Sophomore | Thionville, France | Transferred to IUP |
| Mathis Mönninghoff | 22 | F | 6'7" | 189 | Sophomore | Ibbenbüren, Germany | Signed a Pro Contract with TBB Trier |
| Ryan Spangler | 15 | F | 6'8" | 232 | Freshman | Blanchard, OK | Transferred to Oklahoma |
| Chris Sarbaugh | 14 | G | 6'3" | 195 | Freshman | Spokane, WA | Transferred to North Idaho College |

=== Incoming transfers ===
| Name | Pos. | Height | Weight | Year | Hometown | Previous School | Years Remaining | Date Eligible |
|---|---|---|---|---|---|---|---|---|
| Drew Barham | G | 6'6" | 195 | Junior (Redshirt) | Memphis, TN | Memphis | 2 | Oct. 1, 2012 |
| Gerard Coleman | G | 6'3" | 174 | Junior | Boston, MA | Providence | 2 | Oct. 1, 2013 |
| Angel Nunez | F | 6'8" | 200 | Sophomore | Bronx, NY | Louisville | 2.5 | Dec. 21, 2013 |

=== 2012 recruiting class ===
College recruiting information
| Name | Hometown | School | Height | Weight | Commit date |
|---|---|---|---|---|---|
| Przemek Karnowski; C | Torun, Poland | Nicolaus Copernicus; Siarka Jezioro Tarnobrzeg | 7 ft 1 in (2.16 m) | 280 lb (130 kg) | May 7, 2012 |
| Przemek Karnowski; C | Recruit ratings: ESPN: (NR) | | | | |
| Rem Bakamus; G | Longview, WA | Mark Morris | 6 ft 0 in (1.83 m) | 150 lb (68 kg) | |
| Rem Bakamus; G | Recruit ratings: ESPN: (NR) | | | | |
Overall recruit ranking: Scout: NR Rivals: NR 247Sports: NR ESPN: NR
Note: In many cases, Scout, Rivals, 247Sports, On3, and ESPN may conflict in their listings of height and weight.; In these cases, the average was taken. ESPN grades are on a 100-point scale.; Sources: "2012 Gonzaga Rivals Commits". Rivals.; "2012 Gonzaga Scout Commits". Scout.; "2012 Gonzaga ESPN Commits". ESPN.; "Scout.com Team Recruiting Rankings". Scout.; "2012 Team Ranking". Rivals.; "2012 Gonzaga 24/7 Sports Commits". 247Sports.

== Roster ==
2012–13 Gonzaga Bulldogs men's basketball team
Players
Coaches

| Pos. | # | Name | Height | Weight | Year | Previous school | Hometown |
|---|---|---|---|---|---|---|---|
| G | 30 | Mike Hart | 6 ft 6 in (1.98 m) | 206 lb (93 kg) | RS Sr | Jesuit | Portland, OR |
| F | 20 | Elias Harris | 6 ft 8 in (2.03 m) | 239 lb (108 kg) | Sr | Friedrich-Magnus-Schwerd-Gymnasium; BIS Speyer | Speyer, Germany |
| F | 10 | Guy Landry Edi | 6 ft 6 in (1.98 m) | 218 lb (99 kg) | Sr | Stoneridge Prep (CA); Midland College | Agboville, Côte d'Ivoire |
| F | 13 | Kelly Olynyk | 7 ft 0 in (2.13 m) | 238 lb (108 kg) | RS Jr | South Kamloops | Kamloops, BC |
| C | 35 | Sam Dower | 6 ft 9 in (2.06 m) | 255 lb (116 kg) | RS Jr | Osseo | Brooklyn Park, MN |
| G | 11 | David Stockton | 5 ft 11 in (1.8 m) | 165 lb (75 kg) | RS Jr | Gonzaga Prep | Spokane, WA |
| G | 43 | Drew Barham | 6 ft 6 in (1.98 m) | 195 lb (88 kg) | RS Jr | Christian Brothers; Memphis | Memphis, TN |
| G | 22 | Gerard Coleman (I) (redshirt) | 6 ft 3 in (1.91 m) | 173 lb (78 kg) | Jr | Tilton School (Tilton, NH); Providence | Boston, MA |
| F | 2 | Angel Nunez (I) (redshirt) | 6 ft 8 in (2.03 m) | 200 lb (91 kg) | So | Notre Dame Prep (MA); Louisville | Bronx, NY |
| G | 5 | Gary Bell Jr. | 6 ft 1 in (1.85 m) | 205 lb (93 kg) | So | Kentridge | Kent, WA |
| G | 4 | Kevin Pangos | 6 ft 2 in (1.88 m) | 182 lb (83 kg) | So | Denison Secondary | Newmarket, ON |
| G | 3 | Kyle Dranginis | 6 ft 5 in (1.96 m) | 175 lb (79 kg) | RS Fr | Skyview | Nampa, ID |
| C | 24 | Przemek Karnowski | 7 ft 1 in (2.16 m) | 305 lb (138 kg) | Fr | Nicolaus Copernicus; Siarka Jezioro Tarnobrzeg | Toruń, Poland |
| G | 15 | Rem Bakamus (W) | 6 ft 0 in (1.83 m) | 150 lb (68 kg) | Fr | Mark Morris | Longview, WA |

Head coach

- Mark Few (Oregon)

Assistant coach(es)

- Tommy Lloyd (Whitman)
- Ray Giacoletti (Minot State)
- Donny Daniels (Cal State Fullerton)

Legend

- (C) Team captain
- (S) Suspended
- (I) Ineligible
- (W) Walk-on
- Injured
- Current redshirt

Roster

== Schedule ==
| Date time, TV | Rank^{#} | Opponent^{#} | Result | Record | High points | High rebounds | High assists | Site (attendance) city, state |
Exhibition
| 10/27/2012*; 5:00 pm, KHQ | No. 21 | Northwest Nazarene | W 93–45 | – | 17 – Karnowski | 9 – Hart | 5 – Stockton | McCarthey Athletic Center (6,000); Spokane, WA |
Regular Season
| 11/09/2012*; 6:00 pm, RTNW | No. 21 | Southern Utah | W 103–65 | 1–0 | 22 – Karnowski | 7 – Edi, Harris | 6 – Pangos | McCarthey Athletic Center (6,000); Spokane, WA |
| 11/12/2012*; 9:00 pm, ESPN | No. 19 | West Virginia; ESPN College Hoops Tip-Off Marathon | W 84–50 | 2–0 | 15 – Bell | 7 – Edi, Harris | 5 – Stockton | McCarthey Athletic Center (6,000); Spokane, WA |
| 11/18/2012*; 1:00 pm, KHQ | No. 19 | South Dakota | W 96–58 | 3–0 | 20 – Karnowski | 18 – Harris | 6 – Pangos | McCarthey Athletic Center (6,000); Spokane, WA |
| 11/22/2012*; 6:00 pm, ESPN2 | No. 17 | vs. Clemson; Old Spice Classic First Round | W 57–49 | 4–0 | 13 – Tied | 9 – Harris | 7 – Stockton | HP Field House (2,076); Lake Buena Vista, FL |
| 11/23/2012*; 4:30 pm, ESPN2 | No. 17 | vs. Oklahoma; Old Spice Classic Semi-Final | W 72–47 | 5–0 | 18 – Harris | 8 – Olynyk | 2 – 3 players | HP Field House (2,205); Lake Buena Vista, FL |
| 11/25/2012*; 4:00 pm, ESPN2 | No. 17 | vs. Davidson; Old Spice Classic Final | W 81–67 | 6–0 | 24 – Harris | 10 – Harris | 5 – Tied | HP Field House (4,121); Lake Buena Vista, FL |
| 11/29/2012*; 6:00 pm, KHQ/RTNW | No. 12 | Lewis–Clark | W 104–57 | 7–0 | 30 – Dranginis | 10 – Olynyk | 7 – Tied | McCarthey Athletic Center (6,000); Spokane, WA |
| 12/01/2012*; 5:00 pm, KHQ | No. 12 | Pacific | W 85–67 | 8–0 | 18 – Dower | 9 – Dower | 4 – Bell | McCarthey Athletic Center (6,000); Spokane, WA |
| 12/05/2012*; 8:00 pm, ESPNU | No. 10 | at Washington State | W 71–69 | 9–0 | 23 – Harris | 7 – Olynyk | 4 – Pangos | Beasley Coliseum (9,367); Pullman, WA |
| 12/08/2012*; 7:00 pm, ESPN2 | No. 10 | No. 13 Illinois | L 74–85 | 9–1 | 16 – Olynyk | 8 – Olynyk | 4 – Harris | McCarthey Athletic Center (6,000); Spokane, WA |
| 12/15/2012*; 6:00 pm, ESPN2 | No. 14 | vs. Kansas State; State Farm Battle in Seattle | W 68–52 | 10–1 | 20 – Olynyk | 7 – Harris | 6 – Pangos | KeyArena (16,241); Seattle, WA |
| 12/19/2012*; 6:00 pm, KHQ | No. 14 | Campbell | W 74–52 | 11–1 | 14 – Karnowski | 6 – Tied | 6 – Harris | McCarthey Athletic Center (6,000); Spokane, WA |
| 12/28/2012*; 5:00 pm, ESPN2 | No. 13 | Baylor | W 94–87 | 12–1 | 31 – Pangos | 7 – Harris | 5 – Bell | McCarthey Athletic Center (6,000); Spokane, WA |
| 12/31/2012*; 3:00 pm, ESPN2 | No. 10 | at No. 22 Oklahoma State | W 69–68 | 13–1 | 23 – Pangos | 9 – Olynyk | 5 – Pangos | Gallagher-Iba Arena (13,611); Stillwater, OK |
| 01/03/2013; 6:00 pm, KHQ/RTRM | No. 10 | at Pepperdine | W 78–62 | 14–1 (1–0) | 18 – Harris | 6 – Harris | 5 – Hart | Firestone Fieldhouse (1,938); Malibu, CA |
| 01/05/2013; 5:00 pm, KAYU/CSNCA | No. 10 | at Santa Clara | W 81–74 | 15–1 (2–0) | 33 – Olynyk | 10 – Olynyk | 4 – Stockton | Leavey Center (4,907); Santa Clara, CA |
| 01/10/2013; 8:00 pm, ESPN2 | No. 9 | Saint Mary's | W 83–78 | 16–1 (3–0) | 31 – Olynyk | 8 – Olynyk | 7 – Stockton | McCarthey Athletic Center (6,000); Spokane, WA |
| 01/17/2013; 7:00 pm, KHQ | No. 8 | at Portland | W 71–49 | 17–1 (4–0) | 21 – Olynyk | 9 – Harris | 4 – Stockton | Chiles Center (4,852); Portland, OR |
| 01/19/2013*; 6:00 pm, ESPN | No. 8 | at No. 13 Butler 'College GameDay' | L 63–64 | 17–2 | 20 – Tied | 7 – Tied | 6 – Pangos | Hinkle Fieldhouse (10,228); Indianapolis, IN |
| 01/24/2013; 8:00 pm, ESPN2 | No. 10 | BYU | W 83–63 | 18–2 (5–0) | 26 – Olynyk | 10 – Harris | 5 – Olynyk | McCarthey Athletic Center (6,000); Spokane, WA |
| 01/26/2013; 5:00 pm, KHQ | No. 10 | San Francisco | W 66–52 | 19–2 (6–0) | 13 – Olynyk | 11 – Harris | 4 – Stockton | McCarthey Athletic Center (6,000); Spokane, WA |
| 01/31/2013; 8:00 pm, ESPN2 | No. 7 | at Loyola Marymount | W 88–43 | 20–2 (7–0) | 15 – Tied | 8 – Karnowski | 7 – Stockton | Gersten Pavilion (3,952); Los Angeles, CA |
| 02/02/2013; 8:00 pm, ESPNU | No. 7 | at San Diego | W 65–63 | 21–2 (8–0) | 18 – Harris | 8 – Tied | 4 – Bell | Jenny Craig Pavilion (4,759); San Diego, CA |
| 02/07/2013; 8:00 pm, KHQ | No. 6 | Pepperdine | W 82–56 | 22–2 (9–0) | 14 – Pangos | 9 – Karnowski | 4 – Tied | McCarthey Athletic Center (6,000); Spokane, WA |
| 02/09/2013; 5:00 pm, KHQ | No. 6 | Loyola Marymount | W 74–55 | 23–2 (10–0) | 20 – Tied | 10 – Harris | 4 – Tied | McCarthey Athletic Center (6,000); Spokane, WA |
| 02/14/2013; 8:00 pm, ESPN2 | No. 5 | at Saint Mary's | W 77–60 | 24–2 (11–0) | 20 – Bell | 9 – Harris | 3 – Tied | McKeon Pavilion (3,500); Moraga, CA |
| 02/16/2013; 1:30 pm, KHQ | No. 5 | at San Francisco | W 71–61 | 25–2 (12–0) | 26 – Olynyk | 13 – Harris | 3 – Hart | War Memorial Gymnasium (4,300); San Francisco, CA |
| 02/20/2013; 8:00 pm, ESPNU | No. 3 | Santa Clara | W 85–42 | 26–2 (13–0) | 17 – Harris | 9 – Harris | 4 – Stockton | McCarthey Athletic Center (6,000); Spokane, WA |
| 02/23/2013; 4:00 pm, KHQ | No. 3 | San Diego | W 81–50 | 27–2 (14–0) | 18 – Pangos | 9 – Olynyk | 4 – Bell | McCarthey Athletic Center (6,000); Spokane, WA |
| 02/28/2013; 8:00 pm, ESPN2 | No. 2 | at BYU | W 70–65 | 28–2 (15–0) | 19 – Olynyk | 9 – Harris | 4 – Tied | Marriott Center (19,731); Provo, UT |
| 03/02/2013; 2:00 pm, KAYU | No. 2 | Portland | W 81–52 | 29–2 (16–0) | 20 – Harris | 11 – Olynyk | 6 – Stockton | McCarthey Athletic Center (6,000); Spokane, WA |
2013 WCC Tournament
| 03/09/2013; 6:00 pm, ESPN2 | (1) No. 1 | vs. (9) Loyola Marymount; Semifinals | W 66–48 | 30–2 | 21 – Harris | 8 – Tied | 4 – Tied | Orleans Arena (7,896); Las Vegas, NV |
| 03/11/2013; 6:00 pm, ESPN | (1) No. 1 | vs. (2) Saint Mary's; Championship Game | W 65–51 | 31–2 | 21 – Olynyk | 12 – Olynyk | 3 – 3 players | Orleans Arena (7,896); Las Vegas, NV |
2013 NCAA Tournament
| 03/21/2013; 1:45 pm, TBS | (1 W) No. 1 | vs. (16 W) Southern; Second Round | W 64–58 | 32–2 | 21 – Olynyk | 10 – Olynyk | 7 – Stockton | EnergySolutions Arena (12,621); Salt Lake City, UT |
| 03/23/2013; 5:40 pm, TNT | (1 W) No. 1 | vs. (9 W) Wichita State; Third Round | L 70–76 | 32–3 | 26 – Olynyk | 14 – Hart | 5 – Pangos | EnergySolutions Arena (16,060); Salt Lake City, UT |
*Non-conference game. ^{#}Rankings from AP Poll. (#) Tournament seedings in parentheses. All times are in Pacific Time. (#) during NCAA Tournament is Seed with Region W=West.

== Season ==
=== Preconference season ===
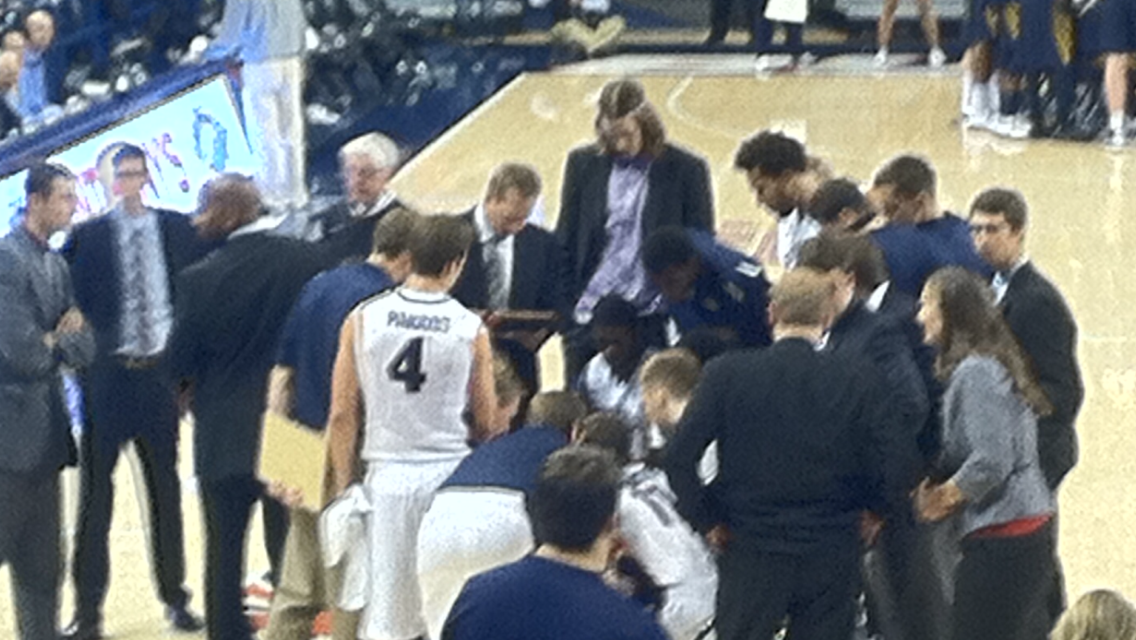
Gonzaga takes a timeout during a non-conference game against West Virginia on November 12, 2012

The Gonzaga Bulldogs started their season with a 103–65 home win against Southern Utah on November 9. They led Southern Utah at halftime 44–27, and started the second half with a 12–2 run. The Zags shot nearly 55 percent from the field, but only outrebounded the Thunderbirds 36–33. Freshman Przemek Karmowski led the Bulldogs with 22 points, while senior Guy Landri Edi scored a career-high 16 points. Three days later, Gonzaga played West Virginia as a part of the ESPN College Hoops Tip-Off Marathon, where they would go on to rout the Mountaineers 84–50. They held West Virginia to 21 percent shooting in the first half, and led 45–18 at halftime. Matt Humphrey's steal and dunk cut Gonzaga's lead to 50–32 with 14:45 left, but Elias Harris responded with a three-pointer to push the lead back to 20. Gary Bell Jr. led the Bulldogs with 15 points, as four other players scored in double figures. On November 18, the Zags played at home against South Dakota, where they would beat the Coyotes 96–58. Despite having 16 turnovers and making 4 of 15 free throws, the team outscored the Coyotes 38–9 in the paint. After a slow start, the Bulldogs went on an 18–4 run midway through the first half. Karnowski had a team-high 20 points, while Harris had 16 points and a career-high 18 rebounds in the victory.

During Thanksgiving weekend, the Bulldogs travelled to Lake Buena Vista, Florida to participate in the 2012 Old Spice Classic. On November 22, Gonzaga went on to beat Clemson 57–49 in the first-round game of the tournament. After being behind by as much as eight, the Zags responded with the help of David Stockton, who had a career-high seven assists. Kelly Olynyk, coming off of a redshirt year, played in his first game of the season after being suspended for the previous three games for violating the student code of conduct. The next day, the Bulldogs went on to beat Oklahoma 72–47. The Sooners never had a lead in the game, as Harris scored 14 of his 18 points in the second half. In the Old Spice Classic championship game two days later, the Zags would hold on beat Davidson 81–67 to capture its second tournament title and remain undefeated on the season at 6–0. After Davidson was ahead by as much as nine, Kevin Pangos connected on a three that made it 58–53 with eight minutes to play and scored another three two minutes later to make it 64–57. Harris finished with a team-high 24 points and 10 rebounds, while Pangos added 23 points, five assists, and two steals.

The team returned home to play Lewis-Clark State on November 29. They routed the Warriors 104–57, and were led by freshman Kyle Dranginis, who had a career-high 30 points, seven assists, and six rebounds. Despite sitting starters Harris and Bell, the Zags forced 20 turnovers and had a 46–20 rebounding advantage. In the teams' first meeting since 1976, the Bulldogs defeated Pacific 85–67 two days later. Despite an early 18–10 Pacific lead, Gonzaga replied with a 10–0 run later in the first half to take a 49–34 halftime lead. The frontcourt accounted for 64 of the team's points, as bench player Sam Dower scored 18 points and grabbed nine rebounds. After this, the Zags faced their first true road game of the season as they travelled to play at Washington State. Down 67–69, DaVonte Lacy made a layup for the Cougars to tie the game. With the game tied at 69, Pangos drove up the court to make a layup with two seconds left to secure the 71–69 victory. Olynyk made 10 of 14 shots and grabbed seven rebounds to keep Gonzaga in the game in the second half, while Harris led the team with 23 points. The victory gave the Bulldogs their best start to a season in Division I history with a 9–0 record.

Gonzaga suffered their first loss of the season against #13 Illinois on December 8, falling 85–74. Tied at 41 at halftime, the Zags shot 38 percent in the second half after shooting 60 percent in the first half. A free throw by Pangos cut Illinois' lead to 75–71 with 2:51 left in the game. However, the Illini responded with an 80–71 advantage to take control of the game. The Bulldogs recovered from their first loss of the season by beating Kansas State in the annual State Farm Battle in Seattle game, 68–52. The team outscored Kansas State in the paint 38–12 and limited the Wildcats to 33 percent shooting. Olynyk led the team with 20 points, while Bell added 11 points. Four days later, Gonzaga returned home and beat Campbell 74–52. The team finished with 33 points from the bench and 44 in the paint, while scoring 18 points off of 15 turnovers. Karnowski led the Zags with 14 points, while Harris put up 11 points and a career-high six assists.

With over a week to prepare for their next game at home, the Bulldogs beat Baylor 94–87 on December 28. The team was unable to hold a lead until there was 4:53 remaining in the first half. At that point, the game went back and forth, and the Zags led by as many as 12. Pangos led the team with 31 points, while Olynyk and Harris added 21 and 17 points, respectively. Gonzaga then went back on the road to play at #22 Oklahoma State, where they got a 69–68 win. With 35.7 seconds left in the game, Mike Hart set a screen for Bell, who made a three-pointer to give the Zags the 67–65 lead. On the following play, Olynyk fouled out and sent Marcus Smart to the free throw line. Smart missed both free throws and Pangos rebounded the ball, and subsequently was sent to the free throw line, where he made both free throws. The win made Gonzaga undefeated against the Big 12 for the season with a 5–0 record.

=== Conference season ===
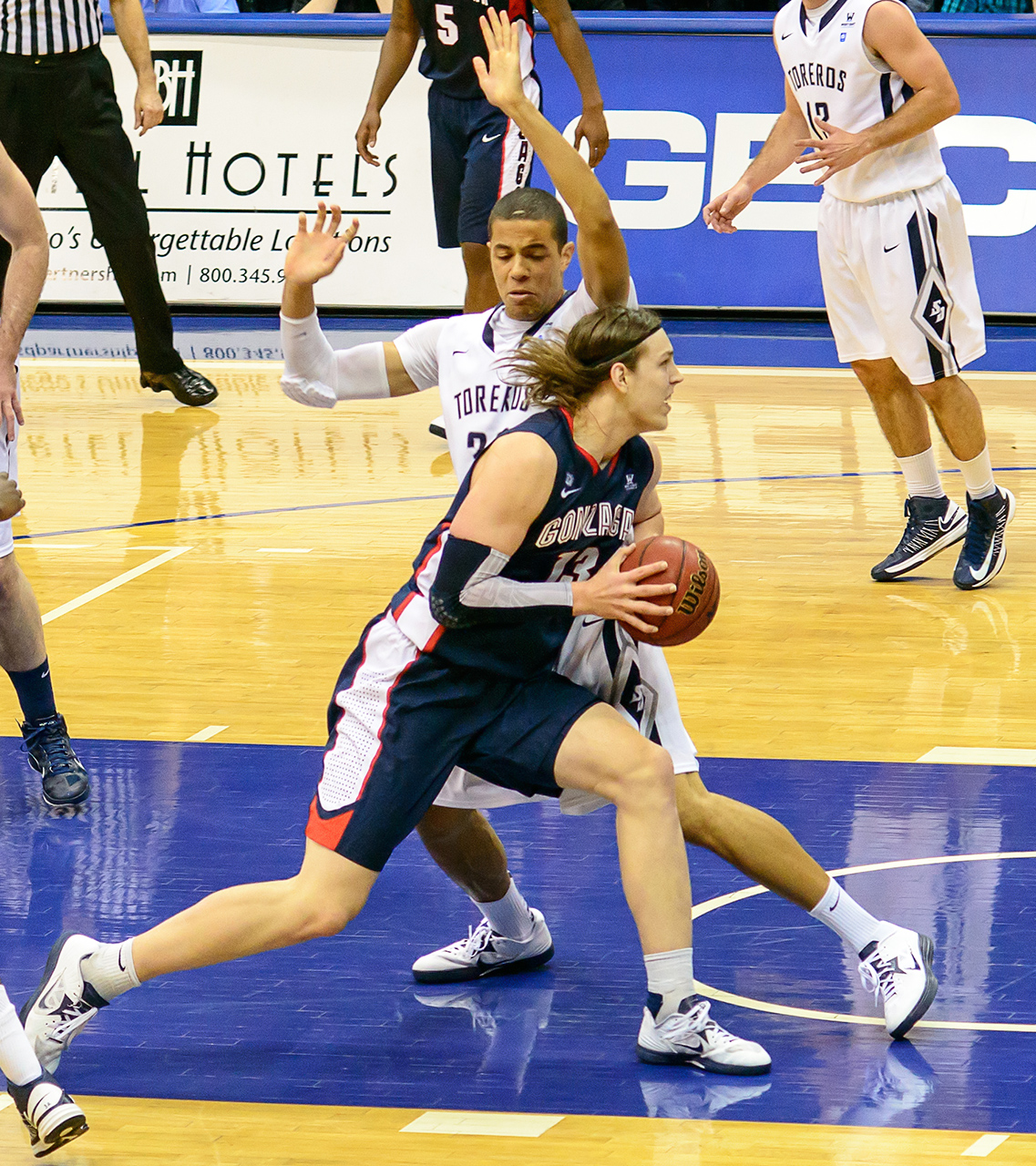
Gonzaga center Kelly Olynyk drives against Jito Kok in a conference game against San Diego on February 2, 2013

To begin the conference season, the Bulldogs travelled to Firestone Fieldhouse on January 3 to play Pepperdine, where they would beat the Waves 78–62. David Stockton came off the bench and keyed the Zags with four steals to hold off a Pepperdine team that was down two with 12 minutes left. Despite scoring a season-low 43.4% from the field, Elias Harris scored 18 points and Kelly Olynyk added 16. Two days later, they went to Santa Clara and beat the Broncos 81–74. The team managed to withstand a Santa Clara rally late when Olynyk made a key putback with 1:55 remaining. He led the team with a career-high 33 points and 10 rebounds, while Harris added 14 points for the Zags. After this, Gonzaga would go back home to play conference rival Saint Mary's, whom they would beat 83–78. Saint Mary's would have one field goal in the final minutes of the first half to help the Bulldogs to a 46–28 halftime advantage. However, Stephen Holt would hit three shots and two free throws in a 90-second span to cut the lead to 55–44. With 26 seconds left, Kevin Pangos missed and fouled Matthew Dellavedova, who made it 79–78. Gonzaga held on for the win and was led by 31 points from Olynyk.

On January 17, the Bulldogs went on the road to play Portland, whom they beat 71–49. Despite two early fouls on Olynyk in the first half, Gonzaga shot 46.6% from the field. Olynyk would come back with a strong second half to finish with 21 points, eight rebounds, one steal, and two blocks. The game extended Gonzaga's best start in school history with an eight-game winning streak. Two days later, they would travel to Hinkle Fieldhouse to play a non-conference game at #13 Butler as a part of the debut game of ESPN's College GameDay for the 2013 college basketball season. Gonzaga was ahead 33–32 at halftime, but Butler scored the first five points of the second half to take the lead. Ahead 63–62 with 3.5 seconds left, Stockton threw the ball inbounds and watched as it was stolen by Butler sophomore Roosevelt Jones, who took the buzzer beater shot to give Butler the 64–63 win. The team would recover and return home from their second loss of the season on January 24 by beating BYU 83–63. Olynyk scored 26 points on 9-for-9 shooting and was also 8-for-8 on free throws. The Zags won the rebound battle 37–29 and outscored BYU 42–28 in the paint while shooting 56.9% from the field.

Two days later, the team would go on to beat San Francisco at home 66–52. Despite shooting 58 percent in the first half and building a lead of 24 at one point, the Bulldogs shot just 8 of 27 in the second half. They were led by Olynyk, who had 13 points, eight rebounds, three assists, three steals, and one assist. The team then travelled to Loyola Marymount on January 31, where they would rout the Lions 88–43. The team shot 13-for-21 from behind the three-point line and shot 54.4% from the field. Gary Bell Jr. led the team with 15 points, which were entirely three-pointers. The team would face a tougher task when they went to San Diego two days later. The Zags left 36–27 at halftime, but San Diego would go on a run to drop the Gonzaga lead to 51–50. They trailed 57–53 with 7 1/2 minutes left before outscoring the Toreros 12–6. Stockton would hit a runner in the lane with 55.9 seconds left, but Olynyk would miss the front end of a one-and-one to give San Diego a chance to win the game with eight seconds left. However, Harris would go on to block the last-second shot to secure the 65–63 victory. Harris scored 18 points and eight rebounds, while Olynyk and Bell added 15 and 13, respectively.

The team would return home on February 7 to rout Pepperdine 82–56. They managed to hold Pepperdine to 36.2% from the field and also forced 21 turnovers. Gonzaga was led by Kevin Pangos, who scored 14 points, collected four assists, and had four steals. Kelly Olynyk was key in the Zag's 74–55 home victory over Loyola Marymount two days later. He scored 20 points, grabbed six rebounds, collected four assists, and had two blocks. Pangos also added 20 points, while Harris recorded a double-double with 16 points and 10 rebounds. Gonzaga's next battle would take them down to Moraga, California, where they would play the second conference game against rival Saint Mary's. Gaels point guard Matthew Dellavedova would score 19 of his 22 points in the first half, as the Gaels led the Zags 33–32 at the break. However, Gary Bell Jr. would go on to score 20 points and fuel a 7–0 run for the opening 1:06 of the second half to take the lead for good. The team managed to shoot 50% from the field, while converting 9 of 17 three-pointers. Pangos contributed 18 points and led the team with three assists, while Olynyk added 17 points to help the Zags take control of first place in the conference with an 11–0 record.

The Zags then travelled to play San Francisco at War Memorial Gymnasium, which is a place where they had not won for three consecutive years. Gonzaga's defense forced San Francisco to stay on the perimeter for a majority of their shots, as the Bulldogs limited the Dons to 36.8% from the field. Olynyk led the team with 26 points and nine rebounds, while Harris added 17 points and 13 rebounds to lead the team to a 71–61 victory. A rebounding advantage of 45–22 and defensive field goal percentage of 30.2% helped Gonzaga rout Santa Clara 85–42 on February 20. The Zags shot 56.2% from the field and converted on 7 of 17 three-pointers. Harris led the team with 17 points and nine rebounds, while Olynyk scored 15. Three days later, the team beat San Diego at home 81–50. The team's defense held the Toreros to 35.7% shooting and 2-for-14 beyond the arc. Gonzaga came into the second half making its first six of seven shots to push the lead to 54–30 with 14 minutes left. After San Diego scored, transfer Drew Barham's three-pointer started a 13–0 Zags run that pushed the lead to 67–32. Pangos led the team with 18 points, while Olynyk contributed 14 points, nine rebounds, and three blocks.

With two conference games left, the Bulldogs travelled to play at the Marriott Center against BYU on February 28. The Zags led by 11 with 10:51 left in the game, but BYU would begin to cut the Gonzaga lead. Three three-pointers by Brock Zylstra and Craig Cusick, as well as two free throws by Brandon Davies tied the game at 60 with 4:18 remaining. Olynyk hit a key jumper with 43 seconds remaining and Pangos hit two free throws to give the Bulldogs some breathing room. However, Gonzaga fouled Cusick on a three-point attempt, causing him to make three free throws to give BYU one final chance with 6.6 seconds remaining. The Zags fouled BYU before Cusick could attempt a three, and Harris' free throws at the other end sealed Gonzaga's 70–65 victory. The final conference game of the season for the Zags would be at home against Portland two days later, whom they would beat 81–52. Harris scored 20 points, while Olynyk grabbed a double-double with 15 points and 11 rebounds. The win made the team finish undefeated in conference play at 16–0 for the first time in team history and conference history. It also broke the team's previous record for the best regular season start with 29 wins.

=== Postseason ===
On March 4, 2013, the team drew a number one ranking in both the AP Poll and Coaches' Poll for the first time in program history. In the 2013 West Coast Conference men's basketball tournament, the Bulldogs received a one seed by virtue of a 16–0 conference record, causing them to have a bye into the semifinals. Due to Loyola Marymount beating Santa Clara in the quarterfinals, Gonzaga was matched up against Loyola Marymount. The team would go on to win the game 66–48, as they were led by Elias Harris, who had 21 points, eight rebounds, one assist, two steals, and two blocks. In the championship game of the tournament, the Zags would go against rival Saint Mary's for the third time. The defense of the Bulldogs forced Saint Mary's guard Matthew Dellavedova to score two points on 1 of 8 shooting and have the Gaels shoot 35.7% from the field as a whole. The team shot 52.1% from the field and dominated the Gaels in the paint 42–18. The Zags were led by Kelly Olynyk, who contributed 21 points and 12 rebounds. Harris also added 19 points for the Bulldogs, and would later be named the MVP of the tournament. With the victory, the Bulldogs secured an automatic bid into the 2013 NCAA tournament.

On Selection Sunday, Gonzaga received a one seed in the 2013 NCAA Division I men's basketball tournament for the first time in school history and was set to play Southern on March 21 at EnergySolutions Arena in Salt Lake City, Utah. The Jaguars previously played against the Bulldogs in an opening game for the 2010–11 season, where Gonzaga routed Southern 117–72. Despite being routed a couple of seasons before, the Jaguars were only behind 34–31 at halftime. Olynyk scored 17 of his 21 points in the second half to help Gonzaga pull ahead. Despite this, Southern managed to tie the game at 56 with 3:45 left, but Gary Bell Jr. would hit a three-pointer to make it 59–56. On the ensuing possession, Southern guard Derick Beltran hit two free throws to cut the deficit to one. However, Kevin Pangos would respond with a three-pointer to put the Zags ahead by four. YonDarius Johnson and Malcolm Miller had open looks on the next possession, but neither was able to convert. Pangos finished with 16 points and hit two free throws with 14.3 seconds left to seal the victory for Gonzaga. The team managed to avoid the upset and hold on for the 64–58 victory to advance to the Round of 32.

Gonzaga's season came to an end on March 21 with a 76–70 loss to ninth-seeded Wichita State. The Shockers had a 36–31 lead at halftime, and were ahead by as much as 13 at one point in the game. However, the Bulldogs would respond with a 12–0 run in the second half to give themselves a 49–41 lead with 11:53 left. Nevertheless, Wichita State started a string of five straight three-pointers when Tekele Cotton hit one with 6:05 remaining, cutting the deficit to four. With 1:28 seconds left, Fred VanVleet threw up and converted on a three-pointer with one second left on the shot clock to give the Shockers a 70–65 lead. The rest of the game was a free throw shooting contest, as Wichita State shot 50% from the field and 50% from beyond the arc, converting on 14 of 28 attempts from long range. Olynyk contributed 26 points and 9 rebounds, while Pangos scored 19. The loss made the Zags the first number one seed to be eliminated as they finished with a record of 32–3.

== Statistics ==
Statistics adapted from ESPN.

| Name | GP | MIN | MPG | FGM | FGA | FG% | 3FGM | 3FGA | 3FG% | FTM | FTA | FT% | OR | DR | RB | RPG | AST | APG | TO | TPG | STL | SPG | BLK | BPG | PTS | PPG |
| Kelly Olynyk | 32 | 845 | 26.4 | 215 | 342 | .629 | 9 | 30 | .300 | 132 | 170 | .776 | 77 | 158 | 235 | 7.3 | 55 | 1.7 | 77 | 2.4 | 22 | 0.7 | 36 | 1.1 | 571 | 17.8 |
| Elias Harris | 34 | 944 | 27.8 | 169 | 337 | .501 | 8 | 47 | .170 | 149 | 194 | .768 | 69 | 184 | 253 | 7.4 | 53 | 1.6 | 60 | 1.8 | 40 | 1.2 | 19 | 0.6 | 495 | 14.6 |
| Kevin Pangos | 35 | 1128 | 32.2 | 135 | 317 | .426 | 78 | 187 | .417 | 67 | 83 | .807 | 14 | 79 | 93 | 2.7 | 116 | 3.3 | 51 | 1.5 | 52 | 1.5 | 0 | 0.0 | 415 | 11.9 |
| Gary Bell Jr. | 34 | 972 | 28.6 | 108 | 257 | .420 | 56 | 143 | .392 | 34 | 47 | .723 | 10 | 65 | 75 | 2.2 | 73 | 2.1 | 43 | 0.8 | 27 | 0.8 | 0 | 0.0 | 306 | 9.0 |
| Sam Dower | 35 | 561 | 16.0 | 96 | 172 | .558 | 4 | 14 | .286 | 46 | 61 | .754 | 32 | 62 | 94 | 2.7 | 11 | 0.3 | 44 | 1.3 | 16 | 0.5 | 15 | 0.4 | 242 | 6.9 |
| Przemek Karnowski | 34 | 365 | 10.7 | 76 | 134 | .567 | 0 | 0 | .000 | 32 | 72 | .444 | 36 | 54 | 90 | 2.6 | 7 | 0.2 | 27 | 0.8 | 6 | 0.2 | 11 | 0.3 | 184 | 5.4 |
| David Stockton | 35 | 654 | 18.7 | 48 | 118 | .407 | 15 | 52 | .288 | 17 | 31 | .548 | 5 | 55 | 60 | 1.7 | 119 | 3.4 | 43 | 1.2 | 53 | 1.5 | 1 | 0.0 | 128 | 3.7 |
| Drew Barham | 28 | 233 | 8.3 | 28 | 63 | .444 | 24 | 54 | .444 | 9 | 16 | .563 | 10 | 30 | 40 | 1.4 | 11 | 0.4 | 7 | 0.3 | 6 | 0.2 | 5 | 0.2 | 89 | 3.2 |
| Guy Landri Edi | 31 | 331 | 10.7 | 25 | 74 | .338 | 7 | 20 | .350 | 36 | 55 | .655 | 16 | 49 | 65 | 2.1 | 10 | 0.3 | 19 | 0.6 | 9 | 0.3 | 0 | 0.0 | 93 | 3.0 |
| Kyle Dranginis | 33 | 343 | 10.4 | 37 | 75 | .493 | 10 | 34 | .294 | 12 | 24 | .500 | 17 | 32 | 49 | 1.5 | 34 | 1.0 | 25 | 0.4 | 14 | 0.1 | 4 | 0.2 | 96 | 2.9 |
| Mike Hart | 35 | 593 | 16.9 | 22 | 37 | .595 | 13 | 22 | .591 | 13 | 20 | .650 | 70 | 67 | 137 | 3.9 | 39 | 1.1 | 8 | 0.2 | 30 | 0.9 | 5 | 0.1 | 70 | 2.0 |
| Rem Bakamus | 9 | 22 | 2.4 | 2 | 5 | .400 | 2 | 5 | .400 | 1 | 2 | .500 | 0 | 1 | 1 | 0.1 | 1 | 0.1 | 1 | 0.1 | 1 | 0.1 | 0 | 0.0 | 7 | 0.8 |
| Brian Bhaskar | 4 | 9 | 2.3 | 0 | 3 | .000 | 0 | 1 | .000 | 0 | 2 | .000 | 2 | 1 | 3 | 0.8 | 1 | 0.3 | 0 | 0.0 | 1 | 0.3 | 0 | 0.0 | 0 | 0.0 |

== Rankings ==
Ranking movement Legend: ██ Increase in ranking. ██ Decrease in ranking.
| Poll | Pre | Wk 2 | Wk 3 | Wk 4 | Wk 5 | Wk 6 | Wk 7 | Wk 8 | Wk 9 | Wk 10 | Wk 11 | Wk 12 | Wk 13 | Wk 14 | Wk 15 | Wk 16 | Wk 17 | Wk 18 | Wk 19 | Final |
|---|---|---|---|---|---|---|---|---|---|---|---|---|---|---|---|---|---|---|---|---|
| AP | 21 | 19 | 17 | 12 | 10 | 14 | 14 | 13 | 10 | 9 | 8 | 10 | 7 | 6 | 5 | 3 | 2 | 1 | 1 | 1 |
| Coaches | 22 | 19 | 16 | 12 | 10 | 14 | 14 | 13 | 10 | 8 | 8 | 10 | 7 | 6 | 3 | 3 | 2 | 1 | 1 | 12 |
