= 2012–13 Iowa State Cyclones men's basketball team =

American college basketball season

2012–13 Iowa State Cyclones men's basketball

NCAA tournament, Round of 32
- Conference: Big 12 Conference
- Record: 23–12 (11–7 Big 12)
- Head coach: Fred Hoiberg (3rd season)
- Assistant coaches: T.J. Otzelberger (7th season); Matt Abdelmassih; Cornell Mann
- Home arena: Hilton Coliseum

2012–13 Big 12 men's basketball standings
	Conf.				Overall
Team	W		L	PCT	W		L	PCT
No. 3 Kansas †	14	–	4	.778	31	–	6	.838
No. 12 Kansas State	14	–	4	.778	27	–	8	.771
No. 17 Oklahoma State	13	–	5	.722	24	–	9	.727
Oklahoma	11	–	7	.611	20	–	12	.625
Iowa State	11	–	7	.611	23	–	12	.657
Baylor	9	–	9	.500	23	–	14	.622
Texas	7	–	11	.389	16	–	18	.471
West Virginia	6	–	12	.333	13	–	19	.406
Texas Tech	3	–	15	.167	11	–	20	.355
TCU	2	–	16	.111	11	–	21	.344
† 2013 Big 12 Tournament winner Rankings from AP poll

The 2012–13 Iowa State Cyclones men's basketball team represented Iowa State University during the 2012–13 NCAA Division I men's basketball season. The Cyclones were coached by Fred Hoiberg, who was in his third season. They played their home games at Hilton Coliseum in Ames, Iowa and competed in the Big 12 Conference.

== Previous season ==
The Cyclones finished 23–11, and 12–6 in Big 12 play to finish 3rd in the regular season conference standings. They lost to Texas in the quarterfinals of the Big 12 tournament. They received an at-large bid to the NCAA tournament, where they defeated UConn and lost to Kentucky.

=== Offseason departures ===
Offseason departures
Name	Position	Reason for departure
Royce White	Forward	Declared for the NBA draft
Chris Allen	Guard	Graduated
Scott Christopherson	Guard	Graduated
Tavon Sledge	Guard	Transferred to Iona
Jordan Railey	Center	Transferred to Washington State

== Recruiting ==
=== Prep recruits ===
College recruiting
Name	Hometown	School	Height	Weight	Commit date
Sherron Dorsey-Walker; SG	Detroit	Pershing	6 ft 4 in (1.93 m)	175 lb (79 kg)	Sep 19, 2011
Sherron Dorsey-Walker; SG	Recruit ratings: Scout: Rivals: 247Sports: ESPN: (88)				
Nazareth Long; SG	Henderson, Nevada	Findlay Prep	6 ft 3 in (1.91 m)	195 lb (88 kg)	Oct 22, 2011
Nazareth Long; SG	Recruit ratings: Scout: Rivals: 247Sports: ESPN: (83)				
Georges Niang; PF	Tilton, New Hampshire	Tilton School	6 ft 7 in (2.01 m)	235 lb (107 kg)	May 15, 2011
Georges Niang; PF	Recruit ratings: Scout: Rivals: 247Sports: ESPN: (94)				
Nkereuwem Okoro; SF	Bronx, New York	St. Raymond Academy	6 ft 5 in (1.96 m)	215 lb (98 kg)	Jun 20, 2011
Nkereuwem Okoro; SF	Recruit ratings: Scout: Rivals: 247Sports: ESPN: (88)				
Overall recruit ranking: 247Sports: 41
Note: In many cases, Scout, Rivals, 247Sports, On3, and ESPN may conflict in their listings of height and weight.; In these cases, the average was taken. ESPN grades are on a 100-point scale.; Sources: "Iowa State 2012 Basketball Commitments". Rivals.; "2012 Iowa State Basketball Commits". Scout.; "ESPN". ESPN.; "Scout.com Team Recruiting Rankings". Scout.; "2012 Team Ranking". Rivals.

== Roster ==
2012–13 Iowa State Cyclones men's basketball team
Players
Coaches

Pos.	#	Name	Height	Weight	Year	Previous school	Hometown
G	1	Bubu Palo	6 ft 1 in (1.85 m)	175 lb (79 kg)	RS Jr	Ames	Ames, Iowa
G	2	Chris Babb	6 ft 5 in (1.96 m)	225 lb (102 kg)	RS Sr	Penn State	Arlington, Texas
F	3	Melvin Ejim (C)	6 ft 6 in (1.98 m)	220 lb (100 kg)	Jr	Brewster Academy	Toronto, Ontario
G	4	Sherron Dorsey-Walker (redshirt)	6 ft 4 in (1.93 m)	175 lb (79 kg)	RS Fr	Pershing	Detroit, Michigan
G	5	Cameron Fowler (redshirt)	6 ft 0 in (1.83 m)	165 lb (75 kg)	RS Fr	U-D Jesuit	Detroit, Michigan
G	10	Aaron Law	5 ft 11 in (1.8 m)	175 lb (79 kg)	RS Fr	Tilton School	Chapel Hill, North Carolina
G	11	Nkereuwem Okoro	6 ft 5 in (1.96 m)	220 lb (100 kg)	Fr	St. Raymond Academy	Bronx, New York
G	12	Austin McBeth (W)	6 ft 1 in (1.85 m)	185 lb (84 kg)	Sr	Iowa Western	Wayland, Iowa
G	13	Korie Lucious (C)	5 ft 11 in (1.8 m)	175 lb (79 kg)	RS Sr	Michigan State	Milwaukee, Wisconsin
G	15	Naz Long	6 ft 4 in (1.93 m)	195 lb (88 kg)	Fr	Findlay Prep	Mississauga, Ontario
G	21	Will Clyburn	6 ft 7 in (2.01 m)	205 lb (93 kg)	RS Sr	Utah	Detroit, Michigan
F	22	Anthony Booker	6 ft 9 in (2.06 m)	250 lb (113 kg)	RS Sr	Southern Illinois	St. Louis, Missouri
C	24	Percy Gibson	6 ft 9 in (2.06 m)	245 lb (111 kg)	So	Southeastern	Detroit, Michigan
G	25	Tyrus McGee	6 ft 2 in (1.88 m)	205 lb (93 kg)	Sr	Cowley County CC	Stringtown, Oklahoma
F	31	Georges Niang	6 ft 7 in (2.01 m)	235 lb (107 kg)	Fr	Tilton School	Methuen, Massachusetts
F	33	Tyler Ellerman (W)	6 ft 8 in (2.03 m)	230 lb (104 kg)	Jr	Dallas Center-Grimes	Dallas Center, Iowa

Head coach

- Fred Hoiberg (Iowa State

Assistant coach(es)

- T. J. Otzelberger (UW–Whitewater)
- Matt Abdelmassih (St. John's)
- Cornell Mann (Akron)

Legend

- (C) Team captain
- (S) Suspended
- (I) Ineligible
- (W) Walk-on
- Injured
- Current redshirt

== Schedule and results ==
Date time, TV	Rank^{#}	Opponent^{#}	Result	Record	High points	High rebounds	High assists	Site (attendance) city, state
Exhibition
November 11, 2012; 1:00 pm, Cyclones.tv		Minnesota State	W 90-57	–	– –	– –	– –	Hilton Coliseum (–); Ames, Iowa
Regular season
November 9, 2012*; 7:00 pm, Cyclones.tv		Southern	W 82–59	1-0	17 – Gibson	12 – Niang	6 – Lucious	Hilton Coliseum (13,975); Ames, Iowa
November 12, 2012*; 7:00 pm, Cyclones.tv		Alabama A&M	W 98–40	2–0	18 – McGee	10 – Ejim	7 – Long	Hilton Coliseum (12,615); Ames, Iowa
November 18, 2012*; 6:00 pm, Cyclones.tv		Campbell; Global Sports Classic	W 88–68	3–0	16 – McGee	8 – Clyburn	9 – Lucious	Hilton Coliseum (11,352); Ames, Iowa
November 20, 2012*; 7:00 pm, Cyclones.tv		North Carolina A&T; Global Sports Classic	W 86–57	4–0	16 – McGee	10 – Ejim	4 – Babb	Hilton Coliseum (11,384); Ames, Iowa
November 23, 2012*; 5:30 pm, CBSSN		vs. No. 22 Cincinnati; Global Sports Classic	L 70–78	4–1	22 – McGee	10 – Ejim	3 – McGee	Thomas & Mack Center (16,730); Las Vegas, Nevada
November 24, 2012*; 7:00 pm		at No. 18 UNLV; Global Sports Classic	L 70–82	4–2	21 – Clyburn	15 – Clyburn	4 – Clyburn	Thomas & Mack Center (13,954); Las Vegas, Nevada
December 1, 2012*; 1:00 pm, Cyclones.tv		BYU	W 83–62	5–2	32 – Clyburn	8 – Ejim	9 – Lucious	Hilton Coliseum (13,739); Ames, Iowa
December 4, 2012*; 7:00 pm, Cyclones.tv		Florida Gulf Coast	W 83–72	6–2	17 – Lucious	12 – Ejim	9 – Lucious	Hilton Coliseum (12,692); Ames, Iowa
December 7, 2012*; 7:00 pm, BTN		at Iowa; Iowa Corn Cy-Hawk Series	L 71–80	6–3	14 – Gibson	7 – Gibson	7 – Lucious	Carver–Hawkeye Arena (15,127); Iowa City, Iowa
December 9, 2012*; 6:00 pm, Mediacom		Omaha	W 93–65	7–3	15 – Niang	13 – Ejim	4 – Niang	Hilton Coliseum (12,785); Ames, Iowa
December 15, 2012*; 4:00 pm, Mediacom		vs. Drake; Hy-Vee Big Four Classic	W 86–77	8–3	21 – Ejim	11 – Ejim	4 – Ejim	Wells Fargo Arena (13,180); Des Moines, Iowa
December 19, 2012*; 7:00 pm, KSMO		at UMKC	W 76–61	9–3	20 – McGee	8 – Niang	8 – Lucious	Municipal Auditorium (3,614); Kansas City, Missouri
January 1, 2013*; 12:00 pm, Cyclones.tv		Yale	W 80–70	10–3	17 – Clyburn	12 – Ejim	5 – Lucious	Hilton Coliseum (12,548); Ames, Iowa
January 9, 2013; 6:00 pm, ESPNU		at No. 6 Kansas	L 89–97 ^{OT}	10–4 (0–1)	19 – Ejim	11 – Ejim	5 – Ejim	Allen Fieldhouse (–); Lawrence, Kansas
January 12, 2013; 1:00 pm, ESPNU		Texas	W 82–62	11–4 (1–1)	18 – Niang	10 – Ejim	9 – Lucious	Hilton Coliseum (14,376); Ames, Iowa
January 16, 2013; 8:00 pm, ESPN2		West Virginia	W 69–67	12–4 (2–1)	16 – Ejim	13 – Ejim	8 – Lucious	Hilton Coliseum (13,148); Ames, Iowa
January 19, 2013; 12:30 pm, Big 12 Network		at TCU	W 63–50	13–4 (3–1)	16 – McGee	12 – Ejim	5 – Lucious	Daniel-Meyer Coliseum (4,753); Fort Worth, Texas
January 23, 2013; 8:00 pm, ESPNU		at Texas Tech	L 51–56	13–5 (3–2)	12 – Clyburn	10 – Clyburn	3 – Babb	United Spirit Arena (7,904); Lubbock, Texas
January 26, 2013; 12:30 pm, Big 12 Network		No. 11 Kansas State	W 73–67	14–5 (4–2)	24 – Clyburn	10 – Tied	8 – Lucious	Hilton Coliseum (14,376); Ames, Iowa
January 30, 2013; 7:00 pm, Big 12 Network		at Oklahoma State	L 76–78	14–6 (4–3)	19 – Babb	8 – Niang	7 – Lucious	Gallagher-Iba Arena (8,776); Stillwater, Oklahoma
February 2, 2013; 7:00 pm, ESPN2		Baylor	W 79–71	15–6 (5–3)	28 – Clyburn	10 – Clyburn	5 – Lucious	Hilton Coliseum (14,376); Ames, Iowa
February 4, 2013; 6:00 pm, ESPNU		Oklahoma	W 83–64	16–6 (6–3)	19 – Clyburn	7 – Ejim	8 – Lucious	Hilton Coliseum (13,178); Ames, Iowa
February 9, 2013; 5:00 pm, ESPN2		at No. 13 Kansas State	L 70–79	16–7 (6–4)	16 – Lucious	11 – Ejim	6 – Lucious	Bramlage Coliseum (12,528); Manhattan, Kansas
February 13, 2013; 7:00 pm, Big 12 Network		at Texas	L 86-89 ^{2OT}	16–8 (6–5)	21 – McGee	16 – Ejim	11 – Lucious	Frank Erwin Center (9,729); Austin, Texas
February 16, 2013; 12:30 pm, Big 12 Network		TCU	W 87–53	17–8 (7–5)	19 – Niang	8 – Clyburn	6 – Lucious	Hilton Coliseum (14,376); Ames, Iowa
February 20, 2013; 8:00 pm, ESPNU		at Baylor	W 87–82	18–8 (8–5)	22 – McGee	12 – Ejim	4 – 3 tied	Ferrell Center (6,293); Waco, Texas
February 23, 2013; 12:30 pm, Big 12 Network		Texas Tech	W 86–66	19–8 (9–5)	17 – Tied	13 – Ejim	6 – Lucious	Hilton Coliseum (14,376); Ames, Iowa
February 25, 2013; 8:00 pm, ESPN		No. 6 Kansas	L 96-108 ^{OT}	19–9 (9–6)	23 – Lucious	7 – 2 tied	7 – Niang	Hilton Coliseum (14,376); Ames, Iowa
March 2, 2013; 12:30 pm, Big 12 Network		at Oklahoma	L 69-86	19–10 (9–7)	22 – McGee	5 – Niang	2 – 3 tied	Lloyd Noble Center (10,789); Norman, Oklahoma
March 6, 2013; 6:00 pm, ESPNU		No. 13 Oklahoma State; Homecoming	W 87–76	20–10 (10–7)	18 – Niang	12 – Ejim	6 – Lucious	Hilton Coliseum (14,011); Ames, Iowa
March 9, 2013; 12:30 pm, Big 12 Network		at West Virginia	W 83–74	21–10 (11–7)	27 – Clyburn	10 – Clyburn	4 – Babb	WVU Coliseum (9,413); Morgantown, West Virginia
Big 12 tournament
March 14, 2013; 11:30 am, ESPN2	(5)	vs. (4) Oklahoma; Quarterfinals	W 73–66	22–10	23 – Ejim	12 – Ejim	9 – Lucious	Sprint Center (17,996); Kansas City, Missouri
March 15, 2013; 6:30 pm, ESPNU	(5)	vs. (1) No. 3 Kansas; Semifinals	L 73–88	22–11	19 – Niang	7 – Ejim	7 – Lucious	Sprint Center (19,160); Kansas City, Missouri
NCAA tournament
March 22, 2013; 8:59 pm, CBS	(10)	vs. (7) No. 23 Notre Dame; Second round	W 76–58	23–11	19 – Niang	8 – Ejim	5 – Ejim	UD Arena (12,495); Dayton, Ohio
March 24, 2013; 11:15 am, CBS	(10)	vs. (2) No. 7 Ohio State; Third round	L 75–78	23–12	19 – Lucious	11 – Ejim	4 – Lucious	UD Arena (12,495); Dayton, Ohio]
*Non-conference game. ^{#}Rankings from AP poll. (#) Tournament seedings in parentheses. All times are in Central Time.

== Rankings ==
Ranking movements Legend: RV = Received votes
	Week																			
Poll	Pre	1	2	3	4	5	6	7	8	9	10	11	12	13	14	15	16	17	18	Final
AP poll													RV	RV						
Coaches Poll												RV	RV							RV

== Awards and honors ==
- All-Conference Selections

Will Clyburn (2nd Team)
Melvin Ejim (3rd Team)
Korie Lucious (Honorable Mention)
Tyrus McGee (Honorable Mention)

- Academic All-Big 12 First Team

Melvin Ejim
Percy Gibson

- Big 12 Newcomer of the Year

Will Clyburn

- Big 12 Sixth Man of the Year

Tyrus McGee

- Big 12 Scholar Athlete of the Year

Melvin Ejim

- Big 12 All-Defensive Team

Chris Babb

- Big 12 All-Rookie Team

Will Clyburn
