= 2012–13 Oklahoma State Cowboys basketball team =

American college basketball season

2012–13 Oklahoma State Cowboys basketball

Puerto Rico Tip-Off Champions

NCAA Tournament, round of 64
- Conference: Big 12 Conference

Ranking
- AP: No. 17
- Record: 24–9 (13–5 Big 12)
- Head coach: Travis Ford (5th season)
- Assistant coaches: Butch Pierre; Chris Ferguson; Steve Middleton
- Home arena: Gallagher-Iba Arena

2012–13 Big 12 men's basketball standings
	Conf.				Overall
Team	W		L	PCT	W		L	PCT
No. 3 Kansas †	14	–	4	.778	31	–	6	.838
No. 12 Kansas State	14	–	4	.778	27	–	8	.771
No. 17 Oklahoma State	13	–	5	.722	24	–	9	.727
Oklahoma	11	–	7	.611	20	–	12	.625
Iowa State	11	–	7	.611	23	–	12	.657
Baylor	9	–	9	.500	23	–	14	.622
Texas	7	–	11	.389	16	–	18	.471
West Virginia	6	–	12	.333	13	–	19	.406
Texas Tech	3	–	15	.167	11	–	20	.355
TCU	2	–	16	.111	11	–	21	.344
† 2013 Big 12 Tournament winner Rankings from AP poll

The 2012–13 Oklahoma State Cowboys basketball team represented Oklahoma State University in the 2012–13 NCAA Division I men's basketball season. This was head coach Travis Ford's fifth season at Oklahoma State. The Cowboys competed in the Big 12 Conference and played their home games at the Gallagher-Iba Arena. They finished the season 24–9, 13–5 in Big 12 play to finish in third place. They advanced to the semifinals of the Big 12 tournament where they lost to Kansas State. They received an at-large bid to the 2013 NCAA tournament where they lost in the second round to Oregon.

== Pre-season ==
=== Departures ===
Name	Number	Pos.	Height	Weight	Year	Hometown	Notes
Cezar Guerrero	1	G	6'0"	175	Sophomore	Huntington Park, California	Transferred- Fresno State
Fred Gulley	3	G	6'2"	177	Redshirt Sophomore	Fayetteville, Arkansas	Transferred- Arkansas
Keiton Page	12	G	5'9"	165	Senior	Pawnee, Oklahoma	Graduated
Darrell Williams	25	F	6'8"	245	Senior	Chicago, Illinois	Suspended - Rape Conviction Reversed
Grayson George	30	G	6'2"	180	Freshman	Minneapolis, Kansas	

=== Recruits ===
College recruiting information
Name	Hometown	School	Height	Weight	Commit date
Phil Forte; SG	Flower Mound, TX	Edward S. Marcus High School	5 ft 11 in (1.80 m)	180 lb (82 kg)	Sep 11, 2011
Phil Forte; SG	Recruit ratings: Scout: Rivals: (89)				
Kirby Gardner; PG	San Bernardino, CA	San Bernardino Valley College	6 ft 2 in (1.88 m)	200 lb (91 kg)	Jul 3, 2012
Kirby Gardner; PG	Recruit ratings: Scout: Rivals: (JC)				
Kamari Murphy; PF	Brooklyn, NY	IMG Academy FL.	6 ft 8 in (2.03 m)	200 lb (91 kg)	Aug 30, 2011
Kamari Murphy; PF	Recruit ratings: Scout: Rivals: (89)				
Marcus Smart; SG	Flower Mound, TX	Edward S. Marcus High School	6 ft 4 in (1.93 m)	220 lb (100 kg)	Sep 10, 2011
Marcus Smart; SG	Recruit ratings: Scout: Rivals: (97)				
Overall recruit ranking: Scout: Not Ranked Top 20 Rivals: 21 ESPN: 22
Note: In many cases, Scout, Rivals, 247Sports, On3, and ESPN may conflict in their listings of height and weight.; In these cases, the average was taken. ESPN grades are on a 100-point scale.; Sources: "Oklahoma State 2012 Basketball Commitments". Rivals.; "2012 Oklahoma State Basketball Commits". Scout.; "ESPN". ESPN.; "Scout.com Team Recruiting Rankings". Scout.; "2012 Team Ranking". Rivals.

== Roster ==
2012–13 Oklahoma State Cowboys men's basketball team
Players
Coaches

Pos.	#	Name	Height	Weight	Year	Previous school	Hometown
G/F	0	Jean-Paul Olukemi (Injured)	6 ft 6 in (1.98 m)	215 lb (98 kg)	Sr	Stoneridge Prep; Vincennes University	LaHabra, CA
G/F	2	Le'Bryan Nash	6 ft 7 in (2.01 m)	230 lb (104 kg)	So	Lincoln	Dallas, TX
G/F	4	Brian Williams (C)	6 ft 5 in (1.96 m)	205 lb (93 kg)	RS So	Glen Oaks	Baton Rouge, LA
G	5	Ford Stuen	6 ft 4 in (1.93 m)	185 lb (84 kg)	Fr	Henderson County; IMG Academy (Fla.)	Henderson, KY
G	10	Phil Forte	5 ft 11 in (1.8 m)	195 lb (88 kg)	Fr	Marcus	Flower Mound, TX
F/C	13	Mason Cox	6 ft 10 in (2.08 m)	230 lb (104 kg)	Sr	Marcus	Highland Village, TX
F/C	14	Marek Soucek	7 ft 0 in (2.13 m)	235 lb (107 kg)	So	Canarias Academy	Brno, Czech Republic
G	15	Christien Sager	6 ft 3 in (1.91 m)	200 lb (91 kg)	So	Rider	Wichita Falls, TX
F	20	Michael Cobbins	6 ft 8 in (2.03 m)	220 lb (100 kg)	RS So	Palo Duro	Amarillo, TX
F	21	Kamari Murphy	6 ft 9 in (2.06 m)	210 lb (95 kg)	Fr	Lincoln; IMG Academy (Fla.)	Brooklyn, NY
G	22	Markel Brown (C)	6 ft 3 in (1.91 m)	190 lb (86 kg)	Jr	Peabody Magnet	Alexandria, LA
G	33	Marcus Smart	6 ft 4 in (1.93 m)	225 lb (102 kg)	Fr	Marcus	Flower Mound, TX
C	44	Philip Jurick	6 ft 11 in (2.11 m)	270 lb (122 kg)	Sr	East Ridge; Chattanooga State	Chattanooga, TN

Head coach

- Travis Ford (Kentucky)

Assistant coach(es)

- Butch Pierre (Mississippi State)
- Chris Ferguson (Cumberlands)
- Steve Middleton (Southern Illinois)

Legend

- (C) Team captain
- (S) Suspended
- (I) Ineligible
- (W) Walk-on
- Injured
- Current redshirt

== Rankings ==
Ranking movements Legend: ██ Increase in ranking ██ Decrease in ranking — = Not ranked
	Week																				
Poll	Pre	1	2	3	4	5	6	7	8	9	10	11	12	13	14	15	16	17	18	19	Final
AP Poll	—	—	—	20	15	23	24	24	22	22	—	—	—	—	22	17					
Coaches Poll	—	—	—	22	17																

== Schedule and results ==
- All times are Central

Date time, TV	Rank^{#}	Opponent^{#}	Result	Record	Site (attendance) city, state
Exhibition
08/10/2012*; 1:00 pm		vs. Barcelona Select	W 95–72	–	Cornella Sports Complex (N/A); Barcelona, Spain
08/12/2012*; 1:00 pm		vs. Barcelona Select	W 86–81	–	Cornella Sports Complex (N/A); Barcelona, Spain
08/10/2012*; 1:00 pm		vs. BC Gran Canaria	W 80–59	–	(N/A); Las Palmas, Gran Canaria
11/01/2012*; 7:00 pm, FSOK		Ottawa	W 109–56	–	Gallagher-Iba Arena (7,707); Stillwater, OK
Non-conference regular season
11/09/2012*; 8:00 pm, FCS Central		UC Davis	W 73–65	1–0	Gallagher-Iba Arena (9,853); Stillwater, OK
11/15/2012*; 9:30 am, ESPNU		vs. Akron; Puerto Rico Tip-Off First Round	W 69–65 ^{OT}	2–0	Coliseo Rubén Rodríguez (N/A); Bayamón, Puerto Rico
11/16/2012*; 9:30 am, ESPNU		vs. Tennessee; Puerto Rico Tip-Off semifinals	W 62–45	3–0	Coliseo Rubén Rodríguez (N/A); Bayamón, Puerto Rico
11/18/2012*; 5:30 pm, ESPN2		vs. No. 6 NC State; Puerto Rico Tip-Off championship	W 76–56	4–0	Coliseo Rubén Rodríguez (6,872); Bayamón, Puerto Rico
11/25/2012*; 1:00 pm, FSOK	No. 20	Portland State	W 81–58	5–0	Gallagher-Iba Arena (8,219); Stillwater, OK
12/01/2012*; 1:00 pm, ESPN3	No. 15	at Virginia Tech	L 71–81	5–1	Cassell Coliseum (7,552); Blacksburg, VA
12/05/2012*; 7:00 pm, ESPNU	No. 23	South Florida	W 61–49	6–1	Gallagher-Iba Arena (8,978); Stillwater, OK
12/08/2012*; 3:00 pm, FSSW+	No. 23	Missouri State	W 62–42	7–1	Gallagher-Iba Arena (8,740); Stillwater, OK
12/16/2012*; 3:00 pm, FSOK	No. 24	Central Arkansas	W 91–63	8–1	Gallagher-Iba Arena (5,538); Stillwater, OK
12/19/2012*; 7:00 pm, FSSW+	No. 24	UT-Arlington	W 69–44	9–1	Gallagher-Iba Arena (8,714); Stillwater, OK
12/22/2012*; 12:00 pm, FSOK	No. 24	Tennessee Tech	W 78–42	10–1	Gallagher-Iba Arena (9,347); Stillwater, OK
12/31/2012*; 5:00 pm, ESPN2	No. 22	No. 10 Gonzaga	L 68–69	10–2	Gallagher-Iba Arena (13,611); Stillwater, OK
Big 12 Regular Season
01/05/2013; 12:30 pm, Big 12 Network	No. 22	at No. 25 Kansas State	L 67–73	10–3 (0–1)	Bramlage Coliseum (12,528); Manhattan, KS
01/09/2013; 7:00 pm, Big 12 Network		TCU	W 63–45	11–3 (1–1)	Gallagher-Iba Arena (7,502); Stillwater, OK
01/12/2013; 2:00 pm, ESPN2		at Oklahoma; Bedlam Series	L 68–77	11–4 (1–2)	Lloyd Noble Center (12,695); Norman, OK
01/19/2013; 1:00 pm, ESPN2		Texas Tech	W 79–45	12–4 (2–2)	Gallagher-Iba Arena (9,193); Stillwater, OK
01/21/2013; 4:30 pm, ESPN		at Baylor	L 54–64	12–5 (2–3)	Ferrell Center (8,039); Waco, TX
01/26/2013; 12:00 pm, ESPNU		West Virginia	W 80–66	13–5 (3–3)	Gallagher-Iba Arena (7,512); Stillwater, OK
01/30/2013; 7:00 pm, Big 12 Network		Iowa State	W 78–76	14–5 (4–3)	Gallagher-Iba Arena (8,776); Stillwater, OK
02/02/2013; 3:00 pm, Big 12 Network		at No. 2 Kansas	W 85–80	15–5 (5–3)	Allen Fieldhouse (16,300); Lawrence, KS
02/06/2013; 6:00 pm, ESPN	No. 22	Baylor	W 69–67 ^{OT}	16–5 (6–3)	Gallagher-Iba Arena (7,547); Stillwater, OK
02/09/2013; 12:45 pm, Big 12 Network	No. 22	at Texas	W 72–59	17–5 (7–3)	Frank Erwin Center (14,036); Austin, TX
02/13/2013; 6:00 pm, ESPNU	No. 17	at Texas Tech	W 91–67	18–5 (8–3)	United Spirit Arena (8,671); Lubbock, TX
02/16/2013; 12:30 pm, Big 12 Network	No. 17	Oklahoma; Bedlam Series	W 84–79 ^{OT}	19–5 (9–3)	Gallagher-Iba Arena (13,611); Stillwater, OK
02/20/2013; 8:00 pm, ESPN2	No. 14	No. 9 Kansas	L 67–68 ^{2OT}	19–6 (9–4)	Gallagher-Iba Arena (13,611); Stillwater, OK
02/23/2013; 1:00 pm, ESPN2	No. 14	at West Virginia	W 73–57	20–6 (10–4)	WVU Coliseum (10,038); Morgantown, WV
02/27/2013; 6:00 pm, ESPNU	No. 15	at TCU	W 64–47	21–6 (11–4)	Daniel-Meyer Coliseum (7,046); Ft. Worth, TX
03/02/2013; 3:00 pm, ESPN	No. 15	Texas	W 78–65	22–6 (12–4)	Gallagher-Iba Arena (12,474); Stillwater, OK
03/06/2013; 6:00 pm, ESPNU	No. 13	at Iowa State	L 76–87	22–7 (12–5)	Hilton Coliseum (14,011); Ames, IA
03/09/2013; 12:30 pm, Big 12 Network	No. 13	No. 9 Kansas State	W 76–70	23–7 (13–5)	Gallagher-Iba Arena (13,611); Stillwater, OK
2013 Big 12 men's basketball tournament
03/14/2013; 8:30 pm, Big 12 Network/ESPN3	(3) No. 14	vs. (6) Baylor; Quarterfinals	W 74–72	24–7	Sprint Center (17,257); Kansas City, MO
03/15/2013; 9:00 pm, Big 12 Network/ESPNU	(3) No. 14	vs. (2) No. 11 Kansas State; Semifinals	L 57–68	24–8	Sprint Center (19,160); Kansas City, MO
2013 NCAA tournament
03/21/2013*; 3:49 pm, TNT	(5 MW) No. 17	vs. (12 MW) No. 25 Oregon; Second Round	L 55–68	24–9	HP Pavilion (16,836); San Jose, CA
*Non-conference game. ^{#}Rankings from AP Poll. (#) Tournament seedings in parentheses. All times are in Central Time. (#) during NCAA Tournament is seed with Region MW=Midwest.

== See also ==
- Oklahoma State Cowboys basketball (men's basketball only)
- 2012–13 Big 12 Conference men's basketball season
