= 2012–13 Oklahoma Sooners men's basketball team =

American college basketball season

2012–13 Oklahoma Sooners men's basketball

NCAA Tournament, round of 64
- Conference: Big 12
- Record: 20–12 (11–7 Big 12)
- Head coach: Lon Kruger (2nd season)
- Assistant coaches: Steve Henson; Lew Hill; Chris Crutchfield
- Home arena: Lloyd Noble Center

2012–13 Big 12 men's basketball standings
	Conf.				Overall
Team	W		L	PCT	W		L	PCT
No. 3 Kansas †	14	–	4	.778	31	–	6	.838
No. 12 Kansas State	14	–	4	.778	27	–	8	.771
No. 17 Oklahoma State	13	–	5	.722	24	–	9	.727
Oklahoma	11	–	7	.611	20	–	12	.625
Iowa State	11	–	7	.611	23	–	12	.657
Baylor	9	–	9	.500	23	–	14	.622
Texas	7	–	11	.389	16	–	18	.471
West Virginia	6	–	12	.333	13	–	19	.406
Texas Tech	3	–	15	.167	11	–	20	.355
TCU	2	–	16	.111	11	–	21	.344
† 2013 Big 12 Tournament winner Rankings from AP poll

The 2012–13 Oklahoma Sooners basketball team represented the University of Oklahoma in the 2012–13 NCAA Division I men's basketball season. The Sooners were led by Lon Kruger in his second season. The team played its home games at the Lloyd Noble Center in Norman, Oklahoma as a member of the Big 12 Conference. They finished the season 20–12, 11–7 in Big 12 play to finish in a tie for fourth place. They lost in the quarterfinals of the Big 12 tournament to Iowa State. The received an at-large bid to the 2013 NCAA tournament, where they lost in the second round to San Diego State.

== Preseason ==
=== Departures ===
Name	Number	Pos.	Height	Weight	Year	Hometown	Notes
T. J. Franklin	3	G	5'11"	175	Senior	Fort Worth, Texas	Graduated
C. J. Washington	5	F	6'7"	230	Senior	Stringtown, Oklahoma	Graduated
Clair Blair, Jr.	14	G	6'2"	205	Junior	Houston, Texas	Graduated
Barry Honoroé	31	F	6'7"	270	Senior	Garland, Texas	Graduated

=== Recruits ===
College recruiting information
Name	Hometown	School	Height	Weight	Commit date
D. J. Bennett; C	Ottumwa, IA	Indian Hills CC	6 ft 9 in (2.06 m)	215 lb (98 kg)	Apr 15, 2012
D. J. Bennett; C	Recruit ratings: Scout: Rivals: (NR)				
Isaiah Cousins; SG	Mount Vernon, NY	Mount Vernon	6 ft 3 in (1.91 m)	175 lb (79 kg)	Mar 28, 2012
Isaiah Cousins; SG	Recruit ratings: Scout: Rivals: (85)				
Buddy Hield; SG	Eight Mile Rock, Bahamas	Sunrise Christian Academy (Bel Aire, KS)	6 ft 4 in (1.93 m)	190 lb (86 kg)	Sep 25, 2011
Buddy Hield; SG	Recruit ratings: Scout: Rivals: (92)				
Je'lon Hornbeak; SG	Arlington, TX	Grace Prep	6 ft 4 in (1.93 m)	185 lb (84 kg)	Oct 2, 2011
Je'lon Hornbeak; SG	Recruit ratings: Scout: Rivals: (91)				
C. J. Cole; PF	Sperry, OK	Sperry	6 ft 7 in (2.01 m)	220 lb (100 kg)	Apr 16, 2012
C. J. Cole; PF	Recruit ratings: Scout: Rivals: (79)				
Jarion Henry; SF	Dallas, TX	La Jolla	6 ft 8 in (2.03 m)	200 lb (91 kg)	Nov 9, 2011
Jarion Henry; SF	Recruit ratings: Scout: Rivals: (POST)				
Overall recruit ranking: Scout: Not Ranked Top 20 Rivals: Not Ranked Top 25 ESPN: Not Ranked Top 25
Note: In many cases, Scout, Rivals, 247Sports, On3, and ESPN may conflict in their listings of height and weight.; In these cases, the average was taken. ESPN grades are on a 100-point scale.; Sources: "Oklahoma 2012 Basketball Commitments". Rivals.; "2012 Oklahoma Basketball Commits". Scout.; "ESPN". ESPN.; "Scout.com Team Recruiting Rankings". Scout.; "2012 Team Ranking". Rivals.

=== Transfers ===
Name	Pos.	Height	Weight	Year	Hometown	Notes
Amath M'Baye	F	6'9"	215	Junior	Bordeaux, France	Joined the team after transferring from Wyoming in 2011-12 season.
Jarrod Kruger	G	6'1"	174	Sophomore	Topeka, Kansas	Joined the team after transferring from Kansas State in 2011-12 season.
Ryan Spangler	F	6'8"	225	Sophomore	Bridge Creek, Oklahoma	Joined the team after transferring from Gonzaga during the off-season; redshirted the 2012-13 season due to NCAA transfer regulations

== Roster ==
2012–13 Oklahoma Sooners men's basketball team
Players
Coaches

Pos.	#	Name	Height	Weight	Year	Previous school	Hometown
C	32	Casey Arent	6 ft 10 in (2.08 m)	229 lb (104 kg)	Sr	Sierra College	Penryn, CA
F	31	D. J. Bennett	6 ft 8 in (2.03 m)	203 lb (92 kg)	Jr	Indian Hills CC	Chicago, IL
G	21	Cameron Clark	6 ft 6 in (1.98 m)	207 lb (94 kg)	Jr	Sherman	Sherman, TX
F	25	C. J. Cole	6 ft 6 in (1.98 m)	220 lb (100 kg)	Fr	Sperry	Sperry, OK
G	11	Isaiah Cousins	6 ft 3 in (1.91 m)	179 lb (81 kg)	Fr	Mount Vernon	Mount Vernon, NY
F	4	Andrew Fitzgerald	6 ft 8 in (2.03 m)	236 lb (107 kg)	Sr	Brewster Academy	Baltimore, MD
G	13	James Fraschilla	5 ft 10 in (1.78 m)	150 lb (68 kg)	So	Highland Park	Dallas, TX
G	1	Sam Grooms	6 ft 1 in (1.85 m)	203 lb (92 kg)	Sr	Chipola College	Greensboro, NC
F	3	Buddy Hield	6 ft 3 in (1.91 m)	200 lb (91 kg)	Fr	Sunrise Christian Academy	Freeport, Bahamas
G	5	Je'lon Hornbeak	6 ft 3 in (1.91 m)	179 lb (81 kg)	Fr	Grace Prep	Arlington, TX
G	12	Jarrod Kruger	6 ft 1 in (1.85 m)	174 lb (79 kg)	RS So	Kansas State	Topeka, KS
F	22	Amath M'Baye	6 ft 9 in (2.06 m)	215 lb (98 kg)	RS Jr	Wyoming	Bordeaux, France
F	15	Tyler Neal	6 ft 7 in (2.01 m)	227 lb (103 kg)	Jr	Putnam City West	Oklahoma City, OK
F	14	Steve Noworyta	6 ft 7 in (2.01 m)	202 lb (92 kg)	Fr	Holy Cross	Hainesport, NJ
F	24	Romero Osby	6 ft 8 in (2.03 m)	238 lb (108 kg)	RS Sr	Mississippi State	Meridian, MS
G	2	Steven Pledger	6 ft 4 in (1.93 m)	224 lb (102 kg)	Sr	Atlantic Shores Christian	Chesapeake, VA
F	00	Ryan Spangler (redshirt)	6 ft 8 in (2.03 m)	225 lb (102 kg)	So	Bridge Creek; Gonzaga	Bridge Creek, OK

Head coach

- Lon Kruger (Kansas State

Assistant coach(es)

- Steve Henson (Kansas State)
- Lew Hill (Wichita State)
- Chris Crutchfield (Omaha)

Legend

- (C) Team captain
- (S) Suspended
- (I) Ineligible
- (W) Walk-on
- Injured
- Current redshirt

== Schedule ==
Date time, TV	Rank^{#}	Opponent^{#}	Result	Record	Site (attendance) city, state
Exhibition
11/02/2012*; 7:00 pm		Washburn	W 83–66	–	Lloyd Noble Center (2,681); Norman, OK
11/07/2012*; 7:00 pm, FSOK		Central Oklahoma	W 94–66	–	McCasland Field House (2,880); Norman, OK
Non-conference Regular Season
11/11/2012*; 3:00 pm, FSSW		Louisiana-Monroe	W 85–51	1–0	Lloyd Noble Center (8,734); Norman, OK
11/16/2012*; 7:00 pm, FSSW+		at UT–Arlington	W 63–59	2–0	College Park Center (6,421); Arlington, TX
11/22/2012*; 6:00 pm, ESPN2		vs. UTEP; Old Spice Classic Quarterfinals	W 68–61	3–0	HP Field House (2,076); Orlando, FL
11/23/2012*; 6:30 pm, ESPN2		vs. No. 17 Gonzaga; Old Spice Classic semifinals	L 47–72	3–1	HP Field House (2,205); Orlando, FL
11/25/2012*; 2:30 pm, ESPNU		vs. West Virginia; Old Spice Classic 3rd place	W 77–70	4–1	HP Field House (4,121); Orlando, FL
11/28/2012*; 7:00 pm, ESPN3		at Oral Roberts	W 63–62	5–1	Mabee Center (7,219); Tulsa, OK
11/30/2012*; 7:00 pm, FSOK+		Northwestern State	W 69–65	6–1	Lloyd Noble Center (8,915); Norman, OK
12/04/2012*; 6:00 pm, ESPN2		at Arkansas	L 78–81	6–2	Bud Walton Arena (12,548); Fayetteville, AR
12/15/2012*; 1:00 pm, ESPNU		vs. Texas A&M; All-College Basketball Classic	W 64–54	7–2	Chesapeake Energy Arena (3,444); Oklahoma City, OK
12/18/2012*; 7:00 pm		Stephen F. Austin	L 55–56	7–3	Lloyd Noble Center (8,572); Norman, OK
12/29/2012*; 7:00 pm		Ohio	W 74–63	8–3	Lloyd Noble Center (10,036); Norman, OK
12/31/2012*; 2:00 pm		Texas A&M-Corpus Christi	W 72–42	9–3	McCasland Field House (2,751); Norman, OK
Big 12 Regular Season
01/05/2013; 3:00 pm, Big 12 Network		at West Virginia	W 67–57	10–3 (1–0)	WVU Coliseum (12,112); Morgantown, WV
01/12/2013; 2:00 pm, ESPN2		Oklahoma State	W 77–68	11–3 (2–0)	Lloyd Noble Center (12,695); Norman, OK
01/16/2013; 7:00 pm, Big 12 Network		Texas Tech	W 81–63	12–3 (3–0)	Lloyd Noble Center (9,178); Norman, OK
01/19/2013; 3:00 pm, Big 12 Network		at No. 16 Kansas State	L 60–69	12–4 (3–1)	Bramlage Coliseum (12,528); Manhattan, KS
01/21/2013; 8:30 pm, ESPN		Texas	W 73–67	13–4 (4–1)	Lloyd Noble Center (10,409); Norman, OK
01/26/2013; 3:00 pm, ESPN		at No. 3 Kansas	L 54–67	13–5 (4–2)	Allen Fieldhouse (16,300); Lawrence, KS
01/30/2013; 6:00 pm, ESPNU		at Baylor	W 74–71	14–5 (5–2)	Ferrell Center (6,533); Waco, TX
02/02/2013; 5:00 pm, ESPN2		No. 18 Kansas State	L 50–52	14–6 (5–3)	Lloyd Noble Center (11,882); Norman, OK
02/04/2013; 6:00 pm, ESPNU		at Iowa State	L 64–83	14–7 (5–4)	Hilton Coliseum (13,178); Ames, IA
02/09/2013; 3:00 pm, ESPN		No. 5 Kansas	W 72–66	15–7 (6–4)	Lloyd Noble Center (13,490); Norman, OK
02/11/2013; 6:00 pm, ESPNU		TCU	W 75–48	16–7 (7–4)	Lloyd Noble Center (8,948); Norman, OK
02/16/2013; 12:30 pm, Big 12 Network		at No. 17 Oklahoma State	L 79–84 ^{OT}	16–8 (7–5)	Gallagher-Iba Arena (13,611); Stillwater, OK
02/20/2013; 6:00 pm, ESPNU		at Texas Tech	W 86–71	17–8 (8–5)	United Spirit Arena (8,248); Lubbock, TX
02/23/2013; 4:00 pm, ESPNU		Baylor	W 90–76	18–8 (9–5)	Lloyd Noble Center (12,199); Norman, OK
02/27/2013; 8:00 pm, ESPN2		at Texas	L 86–92 ^{OT}	18–9 (9–6)	Frank Erwin Center (9,860); Austin, TX
03/02/2013; 12:45 pm, Big 12 Network		Iowa State	W 86–69	19–9 (10–6)	Lloyd Noble Center (10,789); Norman, OK
03/06/2013; 8:00 pm, ESPN2		West Virginia	W 83–70	20–9 (11–6)	Lloyd Noble Center (9,857); Norman, OK
03/09/2013; 4:00 pm, FSSW		at TCU	L 67–70	20–10 (11–7)	Daniel-Meyer Coliseum (5,392); Ft. Worth, TX
2013 Big 12 men's basketball tournament
03/14/2013; 11:30 am, ESPN2		vs. Iowa State; Quarterfinals	L 66–73	20–11	Sprint Center (17,996); Kansas City, MO
2013 NCAA tournament
03/22/2013; 8:48 pm, TBS	No. (10 S)	vs. (7 S) San Diego State	L 55–70	20–12	Wells Fargo Center (20,125); Philadelphia, PA
*Non-conference game. ^{#}Rankings from AP Poll. (#) Tournament seedings in parentheses. All times are in Central Time. (#) during NCAA Tournament is Seed with Region S=South.
