= 2013 Big 12 men's basketball tournament =

- Classification: Division I
- Season: 2012–13
- Teams: 10
- Site: Sprint Center; Kansas City, Missouri
- Champions: Kansas (9th title)
- Winning coach: Bill Self (6th title)
- MVP: Jeff Withey (Kansas)
- Attendance: 90,687 (overall); 19,256 (championship)
- Top scorer: Rodney McGruder (Kansas State) (67 points)
- Television: ESPN, ESPNU, Big 12 Network

2012–13 Big 12 men's basketball standings
| | Conf. | | | | Overall |
| Team | W | | L | PCT | W | | L | PCT |
|---|---|---|---|---|---|---|---|---|
| No. 3 Kansas † | 14 | – | 4 | .778 | 31 | – | 6 | .838 |
| No. 12 Kansas State | 14 | – | 4 | .778 | 27 | – | 8 | .771 |
| No. 17 Oklahoma State | 13 | – | 5 | .722 | 24 | – | 9 | .727 |
| Oklahoma | 11 | – | 7 | .611 | 20 | – | 12 | .625 |
| Iowa State | 11 | – | 7 | .611 | 23 | – | 12 | .657 |
| Baylor | 9 | – | 9 | .500 | 23 | – | 14 | .622 |
| Texas | 7 | – | 11 | .389 | 16 | – | 18 | .471 |
| West Virginia | 6 | – | 12 | .333 | 13 | – | 19 | .406 |
| Texas Tech | 3 | – | 15 | .167 | 11 | – | 20 | .355 |
| TCU | 2 | – | 16 | .111 | 11 | – | 21 | .344 |
† 2013 Big 12 Tournament winner Rankings from AP poll

The 2013 Phillips 66 Big 12 Men's Basketball Championship was held at the Sprint Center in Kansas City, Missouri from March 13–16, 2013. This tournament marked the debut of TCU and West Virginia in the event. First round games were aired on the Big 12 Network, Quarterfinal games were aired on ESPN2 and the Big 12 Network. Semifinal games were available in the conference footprint on the Big 12 Network and outside league markets on ESPNU. All games were carried on WatchESPN, with most also available via ESPN Full Court. The Kansas Jayhawks defeated the Kansas State Wildcats 70–54 in the Championship game, which was televised by ESPN, to receive the Big 12's automatic bid to the 2013 NCAA tournament. All 10 teams qualified for the tournament, with ties broken by using a tiebreaker system.

== Seeding ==
The Tournament consisted of a 10 team single-elimination tournament with the top 6 seeds receiving a bye.

2013 Big 12 Men's Basketball Tournament seeds
| Seed | School | Conf. | Over. | Tiebreaker |
| 1 | Kansas ‡# | 14–4 | 31–6 | 2–0 vs. KSU |
| 2 | Kansas State c# | 14–4 | 27–8 | 0–2 vs. KU |
| 3 | Oklahoma State # | 13–5 | 24–9 | |
| 4 | Oklahoma # | 11–7 | 20–12 | 1–1 vs. ISU; 1–3 vs. KU/KSU; 1–1 vs. OSU; 2–0 vs BU; 1–1 vs. UT; 2–0 vs. WV; 2–0 vs. TT |
| 5 | Iowa State # | 11–7 | 23–12 | 1–1 vs. OU; 1–3 vs. KU/KSU; 1–1 vs. OSU; 2–0 vs BU; 1–1 vs UT; 2–0 vs. WV; 1–1 vs. TT |
| 6 | Baylor # | 9–9 | 23–14 | |
| 7 | Texas | 7–11 | 16–18 | |
| 8 | West Virginia | 6–12 | 13–19 | |
| 9 | Texas Tech | 3–15 | 11–20 | |
| 10 | TCU | 2–16 | 11–21 | |
‡ – Big 12 Conference regular season champions, and tournament No. 1 seed. c – Big 12 Conference regular season co-champion, not tournament No. 1 seed. # – Received a single-bye in the conference tournament. Overall records include all games played in the Big 12 Conference tournament.

== Schedule ==
| Session | Game | Time | Matchup | Television | Attendance |
First Round – Wednesday, March 13
| 1 | 1 | 6:00 pm | #9 Texas Tech 71 vs #8 West Virginia 69 | Big 12 Network | 17,018 |
| 1 | 2 | 8:30 pm | #7 Texas 70 vs #10 TCU 57 | Big 12 Network | 17,018 |
Quarterfinals – Thursday, March 14
| 2 | 3 | 11:30 am | #5 Iowa State 73 vs #4 Oklahoma 66 | Big 12 Network | 17,996 |
| 2 | 4 | 2:00 pm | #1 Kansas 91 vs #9 Texas Tech 63 | Big 12 Network | 17,996 |
| 3 | 5 | 6:00 pm | #2 Kansas State 66 vs #7 Texas 49 | Big 12 Network | 17,257 |
| 3 | 6 | 8:30 pm | #3 Oklahoma State 74 vs #6 Baylor 72 | Big 12 Network | 17,257 |
Semifinals – Friday, March 15
| 4 | 7 | 6:30 pm | #1 Kansas 88 vs #5 Iowa State 73 | ESPNU | 19,160 |
| 4 | 8 | 9:00 pm | #2 Kansas State 68 vs #3 Oklahoma State 57 | ESPNU | 19,160 |
Final – Saturday, March 16
| 5 | 9 | 5:00 pm | #1 Kansas 70 vs #2 Kansas State 54 | ESPN | 19,256 |
Game times in CT. #-Rankings denote tournament seed

== Bracket ==
First round Wednesday, March 13
8 | West Virginia | 69
9 | Texas Tech | 71
7 | Texas | 70
10 | TCU | 57

Quarterfinals; Thursday, March 14
1 | #3 Kansas | 91
9 | Texas Tech | 63
4 | Oklahoma | 66
5 | Iowa State | 73
3 | Oklahoma State | 74
6 | Baylor | 72
2 | #12 Kansas State | 66
7 | Texas | 49

Semifinals; Friday, March 15
1 | #3 Kansas | 88
5 | Iowa State | 73
3 | #17 Oklahoma State | 57
2 | #12 Kansas State | 68

Championship; Saturday, March 16
1 | #3 Kansas | 70
2 | #12 Kansas State | 54

- Rankings (#) refer to AP rankings

== All-Tournament Team ==
Most Outstanding Player – Jeff Withey, Kansas

| Player | Team | Position | Class |
|---|---|---|---|
| Jeff Withey | Kansas | Sr. | C |
| Perry Ellis | Kansas | Fr. | F |
| Rodney McGruder | Kansas State | Sr. | G |
| Angel Rodriguez | Kansas State | So. | G |
| Marcus Smart | Oklahoma State | Fr. | G |

== See also ==
- 2013 Big 12 Conference women's basketball tournament
- 2013 NCAA Division I men's basketball tournament
- 2012–13 NCAA Division I men's basketball rankings
