= 2012–13 West Virginia Mountaineers men's basketball team =

American college basketball season

2012–13 West Virginia Mountaineers men's basketball
- Conference: Big 12 Conference
- Record: 13–19 (6–12 Big 12)
- Head coach: Bob Huggins (6th season)
- Assistant coaches: Larry Harrison; Erik Martin; Ron Everhart
- Home arena: WVU Coliseum

2012–13 Big 12 men's basketball standings
	Conf.				Overall
Team	W		L	PCT	W		L	PCT
No. 3 Kansas †	14	–	4	.778	31	–	6	.838
No. 12 Kansas State	14	–	4	.778	27	–	8	.771
No. 17 Oklahoma State	13	–	5	.722	24	–	9	.727
Oklahoma	11	–	7	.611	20	–	12	.625
Iowa State	11	–	7	.611	23	–	12	.657
Baylor	9	–	9	.500	23	–	14	.622
Texas	7	–	11	.389	16	–	18	.471
West Virginia	6	–	12	.333	13	–	19	.406
Texas Tech	3	–	15	.167	11	–	20	.355
TCU	2	–	16	.111	11	–	21	.344
† 2013 Big 12 Tournament winner Rankings from AP poll

The 2012–13 West Virginia Mountaineers men's basketball team represented West Virginia University during the 2012–13 NCAA Division I men's basketball season. The Mountaineers were led by sixth year head coach Bob Huggins and played their home games at WVU Coliseum. This was the Mountaineers first season as members of the Big 12 Conference. They finished the season 13–19, 6–12 in Big 12 play to finish in eighth place. They lost in the first round of the Big 12 tournament to Texas Tech.

== Before the Season ==
=== Departures ===
Name	Number	Pos.	Height	Weight	Year	Hometown	Notes
Kevin Jones	5	F	6'8"	260	Senior	Mount Vernon, New York	Graduated; Entered 2012 NBA draft- went undrafted; signed contract to play for Cleveland Cavaliers
Pat Forsythe	20	C	6'11"	240	Freshman	Brunswick, Ohio	Transferred to Akron University
Tommie McCune	23	F	6'8"	208	Freshman	Saginaw, Michigan	Transferred to Oakland University
Darryl Bryant	25	G	6'1"	185	Senior	Brooklyn, New York	Graduated
Paul Williamson	32	F	6'8"	205	Freshman	Harts, West Virginia	Transferred to Fairmont State University

=== Recruits ===
College recruiting
Name	Hometown	School	Height	Weight	Commit date
Eron Harris; SG	Indianapolis, IN	Lawrence North	6 ft 3 in (1.91 m)	160 lb (73 kg)	Oct 2, 2011
Eron Harris; SG	Recruit ratings: Scout: Rivals: (85)				
Terry Henderson; SG	Raleigh, NC	Neuse Baptist Christian	6 ft 5 in (1.96 m)	180 lb (82 kg)	Oct 24, 2011
Terry Henderson; SG	Recruit ratings: Scout: Rivals: (91)				
Overall recruit ranking: Scout: Not Ranked Top 25 Rivals: Not Ranked Top 20 ESPN: Not Ranked Top 25
Note: In many cases, Scout, Rivals, 247Sports, On3, and ESPN may conflict in their listings of height and weight.; In these cases, the average was taken. ESPN grades are on a 100-point scale.; Sources: "West Virginia 2012 Basketball Commitments". Rivals.; "2012 West Virginia Basketball Commits". Scout.; "ESPN". ESPN.; "Scout.com Team Recruiting Rankings". Scout.; "2012 Team Ranking". Rivals.

Elijah Macon has committed to West Virginia, but he is doing a Post-Graduate year at Brewster Academy and won't join the Mountaineers until the 2013-14 season.

== Roster ==
2012–13 West Virginia Mountaineers men's basketball team
Players
Coaches

Pos.	#	Name	Height	Weight	Year	Previous school	Hometown
F	1	Dominique Rutledge	6 ft 8 in (2.03 m)	245 lb (111 kg)	Sr	Malcolm X Shabazz; Western Texas JC	Newark, NJ
G	3	Juwan Staten	6 ft 1 in (1.85 m)	195 lb (88 kg)	So	Oak Hill Academy	Dayton, OH
G	4	Jabarie Hinds	5 ft 11 in (1.8 m)	180 lb (82 kg)	So	Mount Vernon	Mount Vernon, NY
G	10	Eron Harris	6 ft 2 in (1.88 m)	170 lb (77 kg)	Fr	Lawrence North	Indianapolis, IN
F	12	Aaron Brown	6 ft 5 in (1.96 m)	220 lb (100 kg)	So	Penn Wood	Darby, PA
F	13	Deniz Kılıçlı	6 ft 9 in (2.06 m)	260 lb (118 kg)	Sr	Mountain State	Istanbul, Turkey
G	14	Gary Browne	6 ft 1 in (1.85 m)	195 lb (88 kg)	So	Arlington Country Day	Cupey, San Juan, Puerto Rico
G	15	Terry Henderson	6 ft 3 in (1.91 m)	170 lb (77 kg)	Fr	Neuse Baptist Christian	Raleigh, NC
G	21	Matt Humphrey	6 ft 5 in (1.96 m)	195 lb (88 kg)	Sr	Hales Franciscan; Oregon; Boston College	Chicago, IL
G	22	Aric Dickerson	6 ft 5 in (1.96 m)	180 lb (82 kg)	RS Fr	St. Thomas More (Connecticut)	Chicago, IL
C	24	Aaric Murray	6 ft 10 in (2.08 m)	250 lb (113 kg)	Sr	Glen Mills Schools; La Salle	Philadelphia, PA
F	34	Kevin Noreen	6 ft 10 in (2.08 m)	250 lb (113 kg)	So	Minnesota Transitions Charter	Minneapolis, MN
F/C	35	Volodymyr Gerun	6 ft 10 in (2.08 m)	250 lb (113 kg)	So	Canarias Basketball Academy; West Virginia	Dnipropetrovsk, Ukraine
F	55	Keaton Miles	6 ft 6 in (1.98 m)	205 lb (93 kg)	So	Lincoln	Dallas, TX

Head coach

- Bob Huggins (West Virginia)

Assistant coach(es)

- Larry Harrison (Pittsburgh)
- Ron Everhart (Virginia Tech)
- Erik Martin (Cincinnati)

Legend

- (C) Team captain
- (S) Suspended
- (I) Ineligible
- (W) Walk-on
- Injured
- Current redshirt

== Schedule ==
Date time, TV	Opponent	Result	Record	Site (attendance) city, state
Exhibition
11/06/2012*; 7:00 pm, RTPT	Glenville State	W 95–53	–	WVU Coliseum (5,208); Morgantown, WV
Regular season
11/12/2012*; 11:59 pm, ESPN	at No. 19 Gonzaga; ESPN College Tip Off Marathon	L 50–84	0–1	McCarthey Athletic Center (6,000); Spokane, WA
11/22/2012*; 12:00 pm, ESPN2	vs. Marist; Old Spice Classic 1st Round	W 87–44	1–1	HP Field House (3,423); Orlando, FL
11/23/2012*; 12:30 pm, ESPN	vs. Davidson; Old Spice Classic Semifinals	L 60–63	1–2	HP Field House (2,927); Orlando, FL
11/25/2012*; 4:30 pm, ESPNU	vs. Oklahoma; Old Spice Classic 3rd place game	L 70–77	1–3	HP Field House (4,121); Orlando, FL
11/28/2012*; 7:00 pm, RTPT	VMI	W 94–69	2–3	WVU Coliseum (7,531); Morgantown, WV
12/05/2012*; 7:30 pm, WOWK	vs. Marshall; Chesapeake Energy Capital Classic	W 69–59	3–3	Charleston Civic Center (11,512); Charleston, WV
12/08/2012*; 4:00 pm, ESPN2	Virginia Tech	W 68–67	4–3	WVU Coliseum (11,631); Morgantown, WV
12/11/2012*; 7:00 pm, CBSSN	at Duquesne	L 56–60	4–4	CONSOL Energy Center (6,244); Pittsburgh, PA
12/15/2012*; 8:00 pm, ESPN	vs. No. 3 Michigan; Brooklyn Hoops Winter Festival	L 66–81	4–5	Barclays Center (16,514); Brooklyn, NY
12/19/2012*; 9:00 pm, ESPNU	Oakland	W 76–71	5–5	WVU Coliseum (4,982); Morgantown, WV
12/22/2012*; 4:00 pm, RTPT	Radford	W 72–62	6–5	WVU Coliseum (7,073); Morgantown, WV
12/30/2012*; 4:00 pm, RTPT	Eastern Kentucky	W 74–67	7–5	WVU Coliseum (8,123); Morgantown, WV
01/05/2013; 4:00 pm, Big 12 Network	Oklahoma	L 57–67	7–6 (0–1)	WVU Coliseum (12,112); Morgantown, WV
01/09/2013; 9:00 pm, ESPN2	at Texas	W 57–53 ^{OT}	8–6 (1–1)	Frank Erwin Center (9,873); Austin, TX
01/12/2013; 1:45 pm, Big 12 Network	No. 18 Kansas State	L 64–65	8–7 (1–2)	WVU Coliseum (10,039); Morgantown, WV
01/16/2013; 9:00 pm, ESPN2	at Iowa State	L 67–69	8–8 (1–3)	Hilton Coliseum (13,148); Ames, IA
01/19/2013*; 2:00 pm, CBS	at Purdue	L 52–79	8–9 (1–3)	Mackey Arena (14,677); West Lafayette, IN
01/23/2013; 7:30 pm, ESPN2	TCU	W 71–50	9–9 (2–3)	WVU Coliseum (7,094); Morgantown, WV
01/26/2013; 1:00 pm, ESPNU	at Oklahoma State	L 66–80	9–10 (2–4)	Gallagher-Iba Arena (7,512); Stillwater, OK
01/28/2013; 9:00 pm, ESPN	No. 2 Kansas	L 56–61	9–11 (2–5)	WVU Coliseum (12,402); Morgantown, WV
02/02/2013; 1:45 pm, Big 12 Network	at Texas Tech	W 77–61	10–11 (3–5)	United Spirit Arena (8,407); Lubbock, TX
02/04/2013; 9:00 pm, ESPN	Texas	W 60–58	11–11 (4–5)	WVU Coliseum (4,966); Morgantown, WV
02/09/2013; 4:00 pm, Big 12 Network	at TCU	W 63–50	12–11 (5–5)	Daniel-Meyer Coliseum (5,192); Ft. Worth, TX
02/13/2013; 9:00 pm, ESPN2	Baylor	L 60–80	12–12 (5–6)	Ferrell Center (6,573); Waco, TX
02/16/2013; 4:00 pm, Big 12 Network	Texas Tech	W 66–64	13–12 (6–6)	WVU Coliseum (10,530); Morgantown, WV
02/18/2013; 9:00 pm, ESPN	at No. 13 Kansas State	L 61–71	13–13 (6–7)	Bramlage Coliseum (12,329); Manhattan, KS
02/23/2013; 2:00 pm, ESPN2	No. 14 Oklahoma State	L 57–73	13–14 (6–8)	WVU Coliseum (10,038); Morgantown, WV
02/27/2013; 8:00 pm, Big 12 Network	Baylor	L 62–65	13–15 (6–9)	WVU Coliseum (6,588); Morgantown, WV
03/02/2013; 2:00 pm, CBS	at No. 6 Kansas	L 65–91	13–16 (6–10)	Allen Fieldhouse (16,300); Lawrence, KS
03/06/2013; 9:00 pm, ESPN2	at Oklahoma	L 70–83	13–17 (6–11)	Lloyd Noble Center (9,857); Norman, OK
03/09/2013; 1:30 pm, Big 12 Network	Iowa State	L 74–83	13–18 (6–12)	WVU Coliseum (9,413); Morgantown, WV
2013 Big 12 men's basketball tournament
03/13/2013; 7:00 pm, Big 12 Network/ESPN3	vs. Texas Tech; First Round	L 69–71	13–19	Sprint Center (17,018); Kansas City, MO
*Non-conference game. ^{#}Rankings from AP Poll. (#) Tournament seedings in parentheses. All times are in Eastern Time.
