= 2012–13 Kansas State Wildcats men's basketball team =

American college basketball season

2012–13 Kansas State Wildcats men's basketball

Big 12 Regular Season Co-Champions

NCAA Tournament, round of 64
- Conference: Big 12 Conference

Ranking
- Coaches: No. 20
- AP: No. 12
- Record: 27–8 (14–4 Big 12)
- Head coach: Bruce Weber
- Assistant coaches: Chris Lowery; Alvin Brooks III; Chester Frazier
- Home arena: Bramlage Coliseum (12,528)

2012–13 Big 12 men's basketball standings
	Conf.				Overall
Team	W		L	PCT	W		L	PCT
No. 3 Kansas †	14	–	4	.778	31	–	6	.838
No. 12 Kansas State	14	–	4	.778	27	–	8	.771
No. 17 Oklahoma State	13	–	5	.722	24	–	9	.727
Oklahoma	11	–	7	.611	20	–	12	.625
Iowa State	11	–	7	.611	23	–	12	.657
Baylor	9	–	9	.500	23	–	14	.622
Texas	7	–	11	.389	16	–	18	.471
West Virginia	6	–	12	.333	13	–	19	.406
Texas Tech	3	–	15	.167	11	–	20	.355
TCU	2	–	16	.111	11	–	21	.344
† 2013 Big 12 Tournament winner Rankings from AP poll

The 2012–13 Kansas State Wildcats men's basketball team represented Kansas State University in the 2012–13 NCAA Division I men's basketball season. The head coach was Bruce Weber, who was in his first year at the helm of the Wildcats. The team played its home games in Bramlage Coliseum in Manhattan, Kansas, its home court since 1988. Kansas State was a member of the Big 12 Conference. They finished the conference season with record of 14–4 to claim a share of Big 12 regular season title with Kansas. In the Big 12 tournament they beat Texas and Oklahoma State before losing to Kansas in the championship game. The season ended with a loss to La Salle in the first round of the 2013 NCAA tournament. The Wildcats finished the season with a 27–8 record.

== Preseason ==
The team plays its home games at Bramlage Coliseum, which has a capacity of 12,528. They are in their 17th season as a member of the Big 12 Conference. Coming back from their 2011–12 season, they compiled a record of 22–11 and advanced to the Round of 32 of the 2012 NCAA Division I men's basketball tournament.

=== Departures ===
Name	Number	Pos.	Height	Weight	Year	Hometown	Notes
Victor Ojeleye	10	F	6'6"	225	Senior	Ottawa, KS	Graduated
James Watson	14	G	6'10"	230	Junior	Atoka, OK	Transferred
Jermey Jones	24	G	6'2"	170	Junior	Chicago, IL	Transferred
Jamar Samuels	32	F	6'7"	230	Senior	Washington, D.C.	Graduated

=== Class of 2012 Recruits ===
College recruiting information
Name	Hometown	School	Height	Weight	Commit date
D. J. Johnson; PF	Saint Louis, MO	Parkway North	6 ft 8 in (2.03 m)	235 lb (107 kg)	Apr 17, 2012
D. J. Johnson; PF	Recruit ratings: Scout: Rivals: (85)				
Michael Orris; PG	Crete, IL	Crete-Monee	6 ft 2 in (1.88 m)	180 lb (82 kg)	May 3, 2012
Michael Orris; PG	Recruit ratings: Scout: Rivals: (89)				
Overall recruit ranking: Scout: Not Ranked Top 20 Rivals: Not Ranked Top 25 ESPN: Not Ranked Top 25
Note: In many cases, Scout, Rivals, 247Sports, On3, and ESPN may conflict in their listings of height and weight.; In these cases, the average was taken. ESPN grades are on a 100-point scale.; Sources: "2012 Kansas State Basketball Commits". Rivals.; "2012 Kansas State Basketball Commits". Scout.; "2012 Kansas State Basketball Commits". ESPN.; "Scout.com Team Recruiting Rankings". Scout.; "2012 Team Ranking". Rivals.

== Schedule ==
Date time, TV	Rank^{#}	Opponent^{#}	Result	Record	Site (attendance) city, state
Exhibition
10/30/2012*; 7:00 pm, FSKC		Washburn	W 81–61	–	Bramlage Coliseum (12,104); Manhattan, KS
11/04/2012*; 1:00 pm		Emporia State	W 81–51	–	Bramlage Coliseum (12,248); Manhattan, KS
Non-conference Regular Season
11/09/2012*; 8:00 pm, FSKC		North Dakota	W 85–52	1–0	Bramlage Coliseum (12,199); Manhattan, KS
11/12/2012*; 7:00 pm, ESPN3		Lamar; NIT Season Tip-Off First Round	W 79–55	2–0	Bramlage Coliseum (12,068); Manhattan, KS
11/13/2012*; 9:00 pm, ESPN2		Alabama-Huntsville; NIT Season Tip-Off Quarterfinals	W 87–26	3–0	Bramlage Coliseum (12,006); Manhattan, KS
11/18/2012*; 1:00 pm, FSKC		North Florida	W 74–55	4–0	Bramlage Coliseum (12,119); Manhattan, KS
11/21/2012*; 6:00 pm, ESPNU		vs. Delaware; NIT Season Tip-Off Semifinals	W 66–63	5–0	Madison Square Garden (7,230); New York, NY
11/23/2012*; 4:00 pm, ESPN		vs. No. 4 Michigan; NIT Season Tip-Off Championship	L 57–71	5–1	Madison Square Garden (7,198); New York, NY
12/02/2012*; 1:00 pm, FSKC		USC Upstate	W 72–53	6–1	Bramlage Coliseum (12,223); Manhattan, KS
12/08/2012*; 1:30 pm, CBSSN		at George Washington	W 65–62	7–1	Charles E. Smith Center (3,570); Washington, D.C.
12/15/2012*; 8:00 pm, ESPN2		vs. No. 14 Gonzaga; Battle in Seattle	L 52–68	7–2	KeyArena (16,241); Seattle, WA
12/18/2012*; 7:00 pm, FSKC		Texas Southern	W 78–69	8–2	Bramlage Coliseum (12,005); Manhattan, KS
12/22/2012*; 7:00 pm, ESPN2		vs. No. 8 Florida; Hy-Vee Wildcat Classic	W 67–61	9–2	Sprint Center (16,303); Kansas City, MO
12/29/2012*; 6:00 pm, FSKC	No. 25	UMKC	W 52–44	10–2	Bramlage Coliseum (12,528); Manhattan, KS
12/31/2012*; 1:00 pm, FSKC	No. 25	South Dakota	W 70–50	11–2	Bramlage Coliseum (12,230); Manhattan, KS
Big 12 Regular Season
01/05/2013; 12:30 pm, Big 12 Network	No. 25	No. 22 Oklahoma State	W 73–67	12–2 (1–0)	Bramlage Coliseum (12,528); Manhattan, KS
01/12/2013; 12:45 pm, Big 12 Network	No. 18	at West Virginia	W 65–64	13–2 (2–0)	WVU Coliseum (10,039); Morgantown, WV
01/16/2013; 8:00 pm, ESPNU	No. 16	at TCU	W 67–54	14–2 (3–0)	Daniel-Meyer Coliseum (4,872); Ft. Worth, TX
01/19/2013; 3:00 pm, Big 12 Network	No. 16	Oklahoma	W 69–60	15–2 (4–0)	Bramlage Coliseum (12,528); Manhattan, KS
01/22/2013; 7:00 pm, Big 12 Network	No. 11	No. 3 Kansas; Sunflower Showdown	L 55–59	15–3 (4–1)	Bramlage Coliseum (12,528); Manhattan, KS
01/26/2013; 12:45 pm, Big 12 Network	No. 11	at Iowa State	L 67–73	15–4 (4–2)	Hilton Coliseum (14,376); Ames, IA
01/30/2013; 7:00 pm, ESPN2	No. 18	Texas	W 83–57	16–4 (5–2)	Bramlage Coliseum (12,109); Manhattan, KS
02/02/2013; 5:00 pm, ESPN2	No. 18	at Oklahoma	W 52–50	17–4 (6–2)	Lloyd Noble Center (11,882); Norman, OK
02/05/2013; 7:00 pm, Big 12 Network	No. 13	at Texas Tech	W 68–59	18–4 (7–2)	United Spirit Arena (8,145); Lubbock, TX
02/09/2013; 5:00 pm, ESPN2	No. 13	Iowa State	W 79–70	19–4 (8–2)	Bramlage Coliseum (12,528); Manhattan, KS
02/11/2013; 8:11 pm, ESPN	No. 10	at No. 14 Kansas; Sunflower Showdown	L 62–83	19–5 (8–3)	Allen Fieldhouse (16,300); Lawrence, KS
02/16/2013; 6:00 pm, ESPNU	No. 10	Baylor	W 81–61	20–5 (9–3)	Bramlage Coliseum (12,528); Manhattan, KS
02/18/2013; 8:00 pm, ESPN	No. 13	West Virginia	W 71–61	21–5 (10–3)	Bramlage Coliseum (12,329); Manhattan, KS
02/23/2013; 7:00 pm, LHN	No. 13	at Texas	W 81–69	22–5 (11–3)	Frank Erwin Center (11,420); Austin, TX
02/25/2013; 6:00 pm, ESPNU	No. 13	Texas Tech	W 75–55	23–5 (12–3)	Bramlage Coliseum (12,216); Manhattan, KS
03/02/2013; 6:00 pm, ESPN2	No. 13	at Baylor	W 64–61	24–5 (13–3)	Ferrell Center (9,656); Waco, TX
03/05/2013; 7:00 pm, Big 12 Network	No. 9	TCU	W 79–68	25–5 (14–3)	Bramlage Coliseum (12,528); Manhattan, KS
03/09/2013; 12:30 pm, Big 12 Network	No. 9	at No. 13 Oklahoma State	L 70–76	25–6 (14–4)	Gallagher-Iba Arena (13,611); Stillwater, OK
2013 Big 12 Men's Basketball tournament
03/14/2013; 6:00 pm, Big 12 Network	No. 11	vs. Texas; Quarterfinals	W 66–49	26–6	Sprint Center (17,257); Kansas City, MO
03/15/2013; 9:00 pm, Big 12 Network/ESPNU	No. 11	vs. No. 14 Oklahoma State; Semifinals	W 68–57	27–6	Sprint Center (19,160); Kansas City, MO
03/16/2013; 5:00 pm, ESPN	No. 11	vs. No. 7 Kansas; Championship Game	L 54–70	27–7	Sprint Center (19,256); Kansas City, MO
2013 NCAA tournament
03/22/2013*; 2:15 pm, truTV	No. 12 (4 W)	vs. (13 W) La Salle; Second Round	L 61–63	27–8	Sprint Center (18,301); Kansas City, MO
*Non-conference game. ^{#}Rankings from AP Poll. (#) Tournament seedings in parentheses. All times are in Central Time. (#) during NCAA tournament is seed with region W=West.

== Rankings ==
Poll	Pre	Wk 1	Wk 2	Wk 3	Wk 4	Wk 5	Wk 6	Wk 7	Wk 8	Wk 9	Wk 10	Wk 11	Wk 12	Wk 13	Wk 14	Wk 15	Wk 16	Wk 17	Wk 18	Wk 19	Final
AP	RV	RV	RV	RV	NR	NR	NR	NR	25	25	18	16	11	18	13	10	13	13	9	11	
Coaches	RV	RV	RV	RV	RV	RV	NR	NR	RV	RV	23	18	13	21	15	11	13	13	10	12	

== Roster ==
2012–13 Kansas State Wildcats men's basketball team
Players
Coaches

Pos.	#	Name	Height	Weight	Year	Hometown
G	1	Shane Southwell	6 ft 6 in (1.98 m)	220 lb (100 kg)	Jr	Harlem, NY
G	3	Martavious Irving	6 ft 1 in (1.85 m)	210 lb (95 kg)	Sr	Fort Lauderdale, FL
F	11	Nino Williams	6 ft 6 in (1.98 m)	226 lb (103 kg)	RS So	St. Louis, MO
F	12	Omari Lawrence	6 ft 3 in (1.91 m)	220 lb (100 kg)	Jr	Bronx, NY
G	13	Angel Rodríguez	5 ft 11 in (1.8 m)	180 lb (82 kg)	So	Miami, FL
F	20	Adrian Diaz	6 ft 10 in (2.08 m)	225 lb (102 kg)	So	Miami, FL
F	21	Jordan Henriquez	6 ft 11 in (2.11 m)	250 lb (113 kg)	Sr	Port Chester, NY
G	22	Rodney McGruder	6 ft 4 in (1.93 m)	205 lb (93 kg)	Sr	Washington, D.C.
F	24	Ryan Schultz	6 ft 5 in (1.96 m)	200 lb (91 kg)	Jr	Wichita, KS
G	33	Brian Rohleder	6 ft 3 in (1.91 m)	210 lb (95 kg)	So	Wichita, KS
G	40	Shawn Meyer	6 ft 3 in (1.91 m)	210 lb (95 kg)	So	Lee's Summit, MO
F	42	Thomas Gipson	6 ft 7 in (2.01 m)	275 lb (125 kg)	So	Ceder Hill, TX
G	44	Michael Orris	6 ft 2 in (1.88 m)	180 lb (82 kg)	Fr	Crete, IL
F	50	D. J. Johnson	6 ft 8 in (2.03 m)	240 lb (109 kg)	Fr	Saint Louis, MO
G	55	Will Spradling	6 ft 2 in (1.88 m)	180 lb (82 kg)	Jr	Overland Park, KS

Head coach

- Bruce Weber (Milwaukee)

Assistant coach(es)

- Chris Lowery (Southern Illinois)
- Alvin Brooks III (Idaho State)
- Chester Frasier (Illinois)

Legend

- (C) Team captain
- (S) Suspended
- (I) Ineligible
- (W) Walk-on
- Injured
- Current redshirt

Roster
Last update: 2012-16-07

== See also ==
- 2012-13 NCAA Division I men's basketball season
- 2012–13 NCAA Division I men's basketball rankings
- 2013 Big 12 men's basketball tournament
