= 2012–13 Big 12 Conference men's basketball season =

2012–13 Big 12 Men's Basketball Season
- League: NCAA Division I
- Sport: Basketball
- Teams: 10
- TV partner(s): CBS, ESPN, FSN

Regular Season
- 2013 Big 12 Champions: Kansas, Kansas State
- Season MVP: Marcus Smart
- Top scorer: Pierre Jackson

Tournament
- Champions: Kansas
- Runners-up: Kansas State
- Finals MVP: Jeff Withey

Basketball seasons
- 2011–12 2013–14

2012–13 Big 12 men's basketball standings
	Conf.				Overall
Team	W		L	PCT	W		L	PCT
No. 3 Kansas †	14	–	4	.778	31	–	6	.838
No. 12 Kansas State	14	–	4	.778	27	–	8	.771
No. 17 Oklahoma State	13	–	5	.722	24	–	9	.727
Oklahoma	11	–	7	.611	20	–	12	.625
Iowa State	11	–	7	.611	23	–	12	.657
Baylor	9	–	9	.500	23	–	14	.622
Texas	7	–	11	.389	16	–	18	.471
West Virginia	6	–	12	.333	13	–	19	.406
Texas Tech	3	–	15	.167	11	–	20	.355
TCU	2	–	16	.111	11	–	21	.344
† 2013 Big 12 Tournament winner Rankings from AP poll

The 2012–13 Big 12 men's basketball season began with practices in October 2012, followed by the start of the regular-season in November. Conference play began in early January 2013 and concluded in March with the 2013 Big 12 men's basketball tournament at the Sprint Center in Kansas City. This was the first season in the Big 12 for two former Mountain West and Big East teams, as the TCU Horned Frogs and the West Virginia Mountaineers, respectively, played their first seasons in the conference.

== Preseason ==
	Big 12 Coaches
1.	Kansas (9)
2.	Baylor (1)
3.	Oklahoma State
4.	Texas
5.	Kansas State
6.	West Virginia
7.	Oklahoma
8.	Iowa State
9.	Texas Tech
10.	TCU

() first place votes

Pre-Season All-Big 12 Teams

Big 12 Coaches
Pierre Jackson Baylor
Jeff Withey Kansas
Rodney McGruder Kansas State
Le'Bryan Nash Oklahoma State
Myck Kabongo Texas

- Player of the Year: Pierre Jackson, Baylor
- Newcomer of the Year: Amath M'Baye, Oklahoma
- Freshman of the Year: Marcus Smart, Oklahoma State

== Rankings ==
Legend
Increase in ranking
Decrease in ranking
Not ranked previous week

		Pre	Wk 2	Wk 3	Wk 4	Wk 5	Wk 6	Wk 7	Wk 8	Wk 9	Wk 10	Wk 11	Wk 12	Wk 13	Wk 14	Wk 15	Wk 16	Wk 17	Wk 18	Wk 19	Wk 20	Final
Baylor	AP	19	16	24	RV	RV						RV		RV								
Baylor	C	18	17	21	RV	RV								RV								RV
Iowa State	AP												RV	RV								
Iowa State	C		RV									RV	RV									RV
Kansas	AP	7	7	12	10	9	9	9	6	6	6	4	3	2	5	14	9	6	4	7	3	
Kansas	C	7	7	11	10	9	9	8	6	6	6	4	2	1	5	13	9	5	3	6	3	8
Kansas State	AP	RV	RV	RV					25	25	18	16	11	18	13	10	13	13	9	11	12	
Kansas State	C	RV	RV	RV	RV	RV			RV	RV	23	18	13	21	15	11	13	13	10	12	14	20
Oklahoma	AP															RV						
Oklahoma	C							RV							RV	RV	RV	RV	RV			
Oklahoma State	AP	RV		20	15	23	24	24	22	22	RV				22	17	14	15	13	14	17	
Oklahoma State	C	RV		22	17	22	23	24	22	21	RV	RV	RV	RV	24	16	14	18	14	15	19	RV
TCU	AP																					
TCU	C																					
Texas	AP	RV	RV	RV																		
Texas	C	24	25	RV	RV																	
Texas Tech	AP																					
Texas Tech	C																					
West Virginia	AP	RV	RV																			
West Virginia	C																					

== Conference Schedules ==
=== Conference matrix ===
This table summarizes the head-to-head results between teams in conference play. (x) indicates games remaining this season.

	Baylor	Iowa State	Kansas	Kansas State	Oklahoma	Oklahoma State	TCU	Texas	Texas Tech	West Virginia
vs. Baylor	–	2–0	1–1	2–0	2–0	1–1	0–2	1–1	0–2	0–2
vs. Iowa State	0–2	–	2-0	1–1	1–1	1–1	0–2	0–2	1–1	0–2
vs. Kansas	1–1	0–2	–	0–2	1–1	1–1	1–1	0–2	0–2	0–2
vs. Kansas State	0–2	1–1	2–0	–	0–2	1–1	0–2	0–2	0–2	0–2
vs. Oklahoma	0–2	1–1	1–1	2–0	–	1–1	1–1	0–2	0–2	0–2
vs. Oklahoma State	1–1	1–1	1–1	1–1	1–1	–	0–2	0–2	0–2	0–2
vs. TCU	2–0	2–0	1–1	2–0	1–1	2–0	–	2–0	2–0	2–0
vs. Texas	1–1	1–1	2–0	2–0	1–1	2–0	0–2	–	0–2	2–0
vs. Texas Tech	2–0	1–1	2–0	2–0	2–0	2–0	0–2)	2–0	–	2–0
vs. West Virginia	2–0	2–0	2–0	2–0	2–0	2–0	0–2	0–2	0–2	–
Total	9–9	11–7	14–4	14–4	11–7	13–5	2–16	7–11	3–15	6–12

=== Baylor ===
Date time, TV	Rank^{#}	Opponent^{#}	Result	Record	High points	High rebounds	High assists	Site (attendance) city, state
Big 12 Regular Season
January 5, 2013; 1:00 pm, ESPNU		Texas	W 86–79 ^{OT}	1–0 (9–4)	25 – Jefferson	12 – Austin	6 – Jackson	Ferrell Center (7,749); Waco, TX
January 8, 2013; 6:00 pm, ESPN2		at Texas Tech	W 82–48	2–0 (10–4)	18 – Jackson	11 – Gathers	7 – Jackson	United Spirit Arena (6,385); Lubbock, TX
January 12, 2013; 5:00 pm, FSSW		TCU	W 51–40	3–0 (11–4)	15 – Jefferson	8 – Austin	6 – Jackson	Ferrell Center (7,753); Waco, TX
January 14, 2013; 8:00 pm, ESPN		at No. 4 Kansas	L 44–61	3–1 (11–5)	15 – Austin	13 – Gathers	4 – Jackson	Allen Fieldhouse (16,300); Lawrence, KS
January 21, 2013; 4:30 pm, ESPN		Oklahoma State	W 64–54	4–1 (12–5)	18 – Jackson	14 – Austin	4 – Walton	Ferrell Center (8,039); Waco, TX
January 26, 2013; 3:00 pm, Big 12 Network		at TCU	W 82–56	5–1 (13–5)	20 – Jackson	6 – Tied	5 – Jackson	Daniel-Meyer Coliseum (6,277); Ft. Worth, TX
January 30, 2013; 6:00 pm, ESPNU		Oklahoma	L 71–74	5–2 (13–6)	22 – Jackson	20 – Austin	6 – Jackson	Ferrell Center (6,533); Waco, TX
February 2, 2013; 7:00 pm, ESPN2		at Iowa State	L 71–79	5–3 (13–7)	23 – Jackson	10 – Austin	6 – Jackson	Hilton Coliseum (14,376); Ames, IA
February 6, 2013; 8:00 pm, ESPN2		at No. 22 Oklahoma State	L 67–69 ^{OT}	5–4 (13–8)	24 – Jackson	12 – Austin	8 – Jackson	Gallagher-Iba Arena (7,547); Stillwater, OK
February 9, 2013; 3:00 pm, Big 12 Network		Texas Tech	W 75–48	6–4 (14–8)	15 – Tied	13 – Austin	7 – Jackson	Ferrell Center (7,750); Waco, TX
February 13, 2013; 8:00 pm, ESPN2		West Virginia	W 80-60	7-4 (15-8)	22 – Gathers	9 – Gathers	9 – Jackson	Ferrell Center (6,573); Waco, TX
February 16, 2013; 6:00 pm, ESPNU		at No. 10 Kansas State	W 81-61	7-5 (15-9)	14 – Walton	6 – 3 tied	9 – Jackson	Bramlage Coliseum (12,528); Manhattan, KS
February 20, 2013; 8:00 pm, ESPNU		Iowa State	W 87-82	7-6 (15-10)	30 – Jackson	10 – Jefferson	8 – Jackson	Ferrell Center (6,293); Waco, TX
February 23, 2013; 4:00 pm, ESPNU		at Oklahoma	W 90-76	7-7 (15-11)	28 – Jackson	6 – Jefferson	8 – Jackson	Lloyd Noble Center (12,199); Norman, OK
February 27, 2013; 7:00 pm, Big 12 Network		at West Virginia	W 65-62	8-7 (16-11)	21 – Austin	11 – Jefferson	5 – Jackson	WVU Coliseum (6,588); Morgantown, WV
March 2, 2013; 6:00 pm, ESPN2		No. 13 Kansas State	W 64-61	8-8 (16-12)	18 – Jackson	12 – Austin	7 – Jackson	Ferrell Center (9,656); Waco, TX
March 4, 2013; 8:00 pm, ESPN		at Texas	W 79-70	8-9 (16-13)	22 – Jackson	8 – Jefferson	8 – Jackson	Frank Erwin Center (10,351); Austin, TX
March 9, 2013; 5:00 pm, ESPN		No. 4 Kansas	W 81-58	9-9 (17-13)	28 – Jackson	7 – 2 tied	10 – Jackson	Ferrell Center (9,695); Waco, TX
2013 Big 12 tournament
March 13–16, 2013*; 9:30 pm, ESPN		vs. No. 14 Oklahoma St; 2013 Big 12 Tournament	W 74-72	9-9 (17-14)	31 – Jackson	10 – Jefferson	3 – Jackson	Sprint Center (17,257); Kansas City, MO
*Non-Conference Game. Rankings from AP poll. All times are in Central Time. (#) Number seeded with region.

=== Iowa State ===
Date time, TV	Rank^{#}	Opponent^{#}	Result	Record	High points	High rebounds	High assists	Site (attendance) city, state
Big 12 Regular Season
January 9, 2013; 6:00 pm, ESPNU		at No. 6 Kansas	L 89–97 ^{OT}	10-4 (0-1)	19 – Ejim	11 – Ejim	5 – Ejim	Allen Fieldhouse (–); Lawrence, KS
January 12, 2013; 1:00 pm, ESPNU		Texas	W 82–62	11-4 (1-1)	18 – Niang	10 – Ejim	9 – Lucious	Hilton Coliseum (14,376); Ames, IA
January 16, 2013; 8:00 pm, ESPN2		West Virginia	W 69–67	12-4 (2-1)	16 – Ejim	13 – Ejim	8 – Lucious	Hilton Coliseum (13,148); Ames, IA
January 19, 2013; 12:30 pm, Big 12 Network		at TCU	W 63–50	13-4 (3-1)	16 – McGee	12 – Ejim	5 – Lucious	Daniel-Meyer Coliseum (4,753); Ft. Worth, TX
January 23, 2013; 8:00 pm, ESPNU		at Texas Tech	L 51–56	13-5 (3-2)	12 – Clyburn	10 – Clyburn	3 – Babb	United Spirit Arena (7,904); Lubbock, TX
January 26, 2013; 12:30 pm, Big 12 Network		No. 11 Kansas State	W 73–67	14-5 (4-2)	24 – Clyburn	10 – Tied	8 – Lucious	Hilton Coliseum (14,376); Ames, IA
January 30, 2013; 7:00 pm, Big 12 Network		at Oklahoma State	L 76–78	14-6 (4-3)	19 – Babb	8 – Niang	7 – Lucious	Gallagher-Iba Arena (8,776); Stillwater, OK
February 2, 2013; 7:00 pm, ESPN2		Baylor	W 79–71	15-6 (5-3)	28 – Clyburn	10 – Clyburn	5 – Lucious	Hilton Coliseum (14,376); Ames, IA
February 4, 2013; 6:00 pm, ESPNU		Oklahoma	W 83–64	16-6 (6-3)	19 – Clyburn	7 – Ejim	8 – Lucious	Hilton Coliseum (13,178); Ames, IA
February 9, 2013; 5:00 pm, ESPN2		at No. 13 Kansas State	L 70–79	16-7 (6-4)	16 – Lucious	11 – Ejim	6 – Lucious	Bramlage Coliseum (12,528); Manhattan, KS
February 13, 2013; 7:00 pm, Big 12 Network		at Texas	W 89-86 ^{2OT}	16-8 (6-5)	21 – McGee	16 – Ejim	11 – Lucious	Frank Erwin Center (9,729); Austin, TX
February 16, 2013; 12:30 pm, Big 12 Network		TCU	W 87-53	17-8 (7-5)	19 – Niang	8 – Clyburn	6 – Lucious	Hilton Coliseum (14,376); Ames, IA
February 20, 2013; 8:00 pm, ESPNU		at Baylor	W 87-82	18-8 (8-5)	22 – McGee	12 – Ejim	4 – 3 tied	Ferrell Center (6,293); Waco, TX
February 23, 2013; 12:30 pm, Big 12 Network		Texas Tech	W 86-66	19-8 (9-5)	17 – Tied	13 – Ejim	6 – Lucious	Hilton Coliseum (14,376); Ames, IA
February 25, 2013; 8:00 pm, ESPN		No. 6 Kansas	W 108-96 ^{OT}	19-9 (9-6)	23 – Lucious	7 – 2 tied	7 – Niang	Hilton Coliseum (14,376); Ames, IA
March 2, 2013; 12:30 pm, Big 12 Network		at Oklahoma	W 86-69	19-10 (9-7)	22 – McGee	5 – Niang	2 – 3 tied	Lloyd Noble Center (10,789); Norman, OK
March 6, 2013; 6:00 pm, ESPNU		No. 13 Oklahoma State	W 87-76	20-10 (10-7)	18 – Niang	12 – Ejim	6 – Lucious	Hilton Coliseum (14,011); Ames, IA
March 9, 2013; 12:30 pm, Big 12 Network		at West Virginia	W 83-74	21-10 (11-7)	27 – Clyburn	10 – Clyburn	4 – Babb	WVU Coliseum (9,413); Morgantown, WV
2013 Big 12 Tournament
March 14, 2013; 11:30 am, ESPN2		vs. Oklahoma; Quarterfinals	W 73-66	22-10 (11-7)	23 – Ejim	12 – Ejim	9 – Lucious	Sprint Center (17,996); Kansas City, MO
March 15, 2013; 6:30 pm, ESPNU		vs. Kansas; Semifinals	L 73-88	22-11 (11-7)	19 – Niang	7 – Ejim	7 – Lucious	Sprint Center (19,160); Kansas City, MO
*Non-Conference Game. Rankings from AP poll. All times are in Central Time. (#) Number seeded with region.

=== Kansas ===
Date time, TV	Rank^{#}	Opponent^{#}	Result	Record	High points	High rebounds	High assists	Site (attendance) city, state
Big 12 Regular Season
January 9, 2013; 6:00 pm, ESPNU	No. 6	Iowa State	W 97–89 ^{OT}	1–0 (13–1)	33 – McLemore	12 – Tied	10 – Johnson	Allen Fieldhouse (–); Lawrence, KS
January 12, 2013; 3:00 pm, Big 12 Network	No. 6	at Texas Tech	W 60–46	2–0 (14–1)	14 – Young	7 – Withey	4 – Johnson	United Spirit Arena (8,534); Lubbock, TX
January 14, 2013; 8:00 pm, ESPN	No. 4	Baylor	W 61–44	3–0 (15–1)	17 – McLemore	8 – McLemore	2 – Tied	Allen Fieldhouse (16,300); Lawrence, KS
January 19, 2013; 1:00 pm, CBS	No. 4	at Texas	W 64–59	4–0 (16–1)	16 – McLemore	9 – Withey	4 – Withey	Frank Erwin Center (14,312); Austin, TX
January 22, 2013; 7:00 pm, Big 12 Network	No. 3	at No. 11 Kansas State	W 59–55	5–0 (17–1)	12 – Releford	10 – Withey	4 – Johnson	Bramlage Coliseum (14,312); Manhattan, KS
January 26, 2013; 3:00 pm, ESPN	No. 3	Oklahoma	W 67–54	6–0 (18–1)	18 – McLemore	9 – Withey	5 – Releford	Allen Fieldhouse (16,300); Lawrence, KS
January 28, 2013; 8:00 pm, ESPN	No. 2	at West Virginia	W 61–56	7–0 (19–1)	17 – Tied	5 – Tied	5 – Releford	WVU Coliseum (12,402); Morgantown, WV
February 2, 2013; 2:00 pm, Big 12 Network	No. 2	Oklahoma State	L 80–85	7–1 (19–2)	23 – McLemore	8 – Withey	6 – Johnson	Allen Fieldhouse (16,300); Lawrence, KS
February 6, 2013; 6:00 pm, ESPNU	No. 5	at TCU	L 55–62	7–2 (19–3)	15 – McLemore	9 – Tied	4 – Releford	Daniel-Meyer Coliseum (7,412); Ft. Worth, TX
February 9, 2013; 3:00 pm, ESPN	No. 5	at Oklahoma	L 66–72	7–3 (19–4)	15 – McLemore	9 – Releford	4 – Johnson	Lloyd Noble Center (13,490); Norman, OK
February 11, 2013; 8:00 pm, ESPN	No. 14	No. 10 Kansas State; Sunflower Showdown	W 83-62	20-4 (8-3)	30 – McLemore	10 – Withey	3 – Johnson	Allen Fieldhouse (16,300); Lawrence, KS
February 16, 2013; 8:00 pm, ESPN	No. 14	Texas	W 73-47	21-4 (9-3)	15 – 2 tied	11 – Withey	4 – Johnson	Allen Fieldhouse (16,300); Lawrence, KS
February 20, 2013; 8:00 pm, ESPN2	No. 9	at No. 14 Oklahoma State	W 68-67 ^{2OT}	22-4 (10-3)	18 – Releford	14 – Withey	3 – Tharpe	Gallagher-Iba Arena (13,611); Stillwater, OK
February 23, 2013; 3:00 pm, Big 12 Network	No. 9	TCU	W 74-48	23-4 (11-3)	18 – Withey	8 – Young	4 – 2 tied	Allen Fieldhouse (16,300); Lawrence, KS
February 25, 2013; 8:00 pm, ESPN	No. 6	at Iowa State	W 108-96 ^{OT}	23-5 (12-3)	39 – Johnson	10 – Withey	7 – Johnson	Hilton Coliseum (14,376); Ames, IA
March 2, 2013; 1:00 pm, CBS	No. 6	West Virginia	W 91-65	24-5 (13-3)	36 – McLemore	10 – Withey	10 – Johnson	Allen Fieldhouse (16,300); Lawrence, KS
March 4, 2013; 6:00 pm, ESPNU	No. 4	Texas Tech	W 79-42	25-5 (14-3)	22 – Withey	9 – Withey	12 – Johnson	Allen Fieldhouse (16,300); Lawrence, KS
March 9, 2013; 5:00 pm, ESPN	No. 4	at Baylor	W 81-58	25-6 (14-4)	23 – McLemore	8 – Withey	2 – 4 tied	Ferrell Center (9,695); Waco, TX
2013 Big 12 tournament
March 14, 2013; 2pm, ESPN	No. 7	vs. Texas Tech	W 91-63	26-6 (13-5)	24 – McLemore	7 – Ellis	5 – Releford	Sprint Center (17,996); Kansas City, MO
March 15, 2013; 6:30pm, ESPN	No. 7	vs. Iowa State	W 88-73	27-6 (13-5)	23 – Ellis	7 – McLemore	8 – Tharpe	Sprint Center (19,160); Kansas City, MO
March 16, 2013; 5pm, ESPN	No. 7	vs. No. 11 Kansas St; Big 12 Championship	W 70-54	28-6 (13-5)	17 – Withey	9 – 2 tied	3 – 3 tied	Sprint Center (19,256); Kansas City, MO
*Non-Conference Game. Rankings from AP poll. All times are in Central Time. (#) Number seeded with region.

=== Kansas State ===
Date time, TV	Rank^{#}	Opponent^{#}	Result	Record	High points	High rebounds	High assists	Site (attendance) city, state
Big 12 Regular Season
January 5, 2013; 12:30 pm, Big 12 Network	No. 25	No. 22 Oklahoma State	W 73–67	1–0 (12–2)	28 – McGruder	6 – Gipson	8 – Rodriguez	Bramlage Coliseum (12,528); Manhattan, KS
January 12, 2013; 12:30 pm, Big 12 Network	No. 18	at West Virginia	W 65–64	2–0 (13–2)	17 – Tied	7 – Henriquez	4 – Spradling	WVU Coliseum (10,039); Morgantown, WV
January 16, 2013; 8:00 pm, ESPNU	No. 16	at TCU	W 67–54	3–0 (14–2)	21 – McGruder	10 – Henriquez	5 – Irving	Daniel-Meyer Coliseum (4,872); Ft. Worth, TX
January 19, 2013; 3:00 pm, Big 12 Network	No. 16	Oklahoma	W 69–60	4–0 (15–2)	20 – McGruder	7 – Southwell	9 – Rodriguez	Bramlage Coliseum (12,528); Manhattan, KS
January 23, 2013; 7:00 pm, Big 12 Network	No. 11	No. 3 Kansas; Sunflower Showdown	L 55–59	4–1 (15–3)	19 – Southwell	7 – Southwell	8 – Rodriguez	Bramlage Coliseum (12,528); Manhattan, KS
January 26, 2013; 12:30 pm, Big 12 Network	No. 11	at Iowa State	L 67–73	4–2 (15–4)	15 – Spradling	7 – McGruder	6 – Rodriguez	Hilton Coliseum (14,376); Ames, IA
January 30, 2013; 8:00 pm, ESPN2	No. 18	Texas	W 83–57	5–2 (16–4)	17 – Gipson	7 – Gipson	8 – Rodriguez	Bramlage Coliseum (12,109); Manhattan, KS
February 2, 2013; 5:00 pm, ESPN2	No. 18	at Oklahoma	W 52–50	6–2 (17–4)	12 – Spradling	9 – McGruder	4 – Southwell	Lloyd Noble Center (11,882); Norman, OK
February 5, 2013; 7:00 pm, Big 12 Network	No. 13	at Texas Tech	W 68–59	7–2 (18–4)	18 – McGruder	9 – McGruder	4 – Southwell	United Spirit Arena (11,882); Lubbock, TX
February 9, 2013; 5:00 pm, ESPN2	No. 13	Iowa State	W 79–70	8–2 (19–4)	22 – McGruder	7 – Gipson	5 – McGruder	Bramlage Coliseum (12,528); Manhattan, KS
February 11, 2013; 8:00 pm, ESPN	No. 10	at No. 14 Kansas; Sunflower Showdown	W 83-62	19-5 (8-3)	20 – McGruder	6 – McGruder	6 – Rodriguez	Allen Fieldhouse (16,300); Lawrence, KS
February 16, 2013; 6:00 pm, ESPNU	No. 10	Baylor	W 81-61	20-5 (9-3)	22 – Rodriguez	10 – Henriguez	10 – Rodriguez	Bramlage Coliseum (12,528); Manhattan, KS
February 18, 2013; 8:00 pm, ESPN	No. 13	West Virginia	W 71-61	21-5 (10-3)	19 – Spradling	7 – Henriguez	7 – Rodriguez	Bramlage Coliseum (12,329); Manhattan, KS
February 23, 2013; 7:00 pm, LHN	No. 13	at Texas	W 81-69	22-5 (11-3)	20 – McGruder	7 – Henriquez	6 – 2 tied	Frank Erwin Center (11,420); Austin, TX
February 25, 2013; 6:00 pm, ESPNU	No. 13	Texas Tech	W 75-55	23-5 (12-3)	20 – Gipson	8 – Gipson	7 – Rodriguez	Bramlage Coliseum (12,216); Manhattan, KS
March 2, 2013; 6:00 pm, ESPN2	No. 13	at Baylor	W 64-61	24-5 (13-3)	18 – McGruder	9 – Henriguez	8 – Rodriguez	Ferrell Center (9,656); Waco, TX
March 5, 2013; 7:00 pm, Big 12 Network	No. 9	TCU	W 79-68	25-5 (14-3)	21 – Rodriguez	5 – Henriguez	10 – Rodriguez	Bramlage Coliseum (12,528); Manhattan, KS
March 9, 2013; 12:30 pm, Big 12 Network	No. 9	at No. 13 Oklahoma State	W 76-70	25-6 (14-4)	22 – McGruder	6 – Gipson	6 – Rodriguez	Gallagher-Iba Arena (13,611); Stillwater, OK
2013 Big 12 tournament
March 14, 2013; 6pm, ESPN	No. 11	vs. Texas	W 66-49	26-6 (14-4)	24 – McGruder	7 – McGruder	5 – Rodriguez	Sprint Center (-); Kansas City, MO
March 15, 2013; 9pm, ESPN	No. 11	vs. No. 14 Oklahoma St	W 68-57	27-6 (14-4)	25 – McGruder	11 – Henriguez	4 – 2 tied	Sprint Center (19,160); Kansas City, MO
March 16, 2013; 6pm, ESPN	No. 7	vs. No. 11 Kansas; Big 12 Championship	W 70-54	27-7 (14-4)	18 – McGruder	6 – Gipson	2 – 2 tied	Sprint Center (19,256); Kansas City, MO
*Non-Conference Game. Rankings from AP poll. All times are in Central Time. (#) Number seeded with region.

=== Oklahoma ===
Date time, TV	Rank^{#}	Opponent^{#}	Result	Record	High points	High rebounds	High assists	Site (attendance) city, state
Big 12 Regular Season
January 5, 2013; 3:00 pm, Big 12 Network		at West Virginia	W 67–57	1–0 (10–3)	21 – Osby	9 – Osby	5 – Hield	WVU Coliseum (12,112); Morgantown, WV
January 12, 2013; 2:00 pm, ESPN2		Oklahoma State	W 77–68	2–0 (11–3)	17 – Osby	9 – Pledger	5 – Hield	Lloyd Noble Center (12,695); Norman, OK
January 16, 2013; 7:00 pm, Big 12 Network		Texas Tech	W 81–63	3–0 (12–3)	17 – Osby	7 – Hield	5 – Grooms	Lloyd Noble Center (9,178); Norman, OK
January 19, 2013; 3:00 pm, Big 12 Network		at No. 16 Kansas State	L 60–69	3–1 (12–4)	12 – Tied	10 – Hield	4 – Grooms	Bramlage Coliseum (12,528); Manhattan, KS
January 21, 2013; 8:30 pm, ESPN		Texas	W 73–67	4–1 (13–4)	29 – Osby	8 – Osby	4 – Tied	Lloyd Noble Center (10,409); Norman, OK
January 26, 2013; 3:00 pm, ESPN		at No. 3 Kansas	L 54–67	4–2 (13–5)	12 – Tied	7 – M'Baye	2 – Tied	Allen Fieldhouse (16,300); Lawrence, KS
January 30, 2013; 6:00 pm, ESPNU		at Baylor	W 74–71	5–2 (14–5)	20 – Tied	8 – Osby	6 – Hornbeak	Ferrell Center (6,533); Waco, TX
February 2, 2013; 5:00 pm, ESPN2		No. 18 Kansas State	L 50–52	5–3 (14–6)	13 – Osby	7 – Osby	2 – Tied	Lloyd Noble Center (11,882); Norman, OK
February 4, 2013; 6:00 pm, ESPNU		at Iowa State	L 64–83	5–4 (14–7)	12 – Fitzgerald	7 – Fitzgerald	3 – Pledger	Hilton Coliseum (13,178); Ames, IA
February 9, 2013; 3:00 pm, ESPN		No. 5 Kansas	W 72–66	5–4 (15–7)	17 – Osby	8 – Osby	4 – Cousins	Lloyd Noble Center (13,490); Norman, OK
February 11, 2013; 6:00 pm, ESPNU		TCU	W 75-48	16-7 (7-4)	12 – M'Baye	7 – Osby	2 – 4 tied	Lloyd Noble Center (8,948); Norman, OK
February 16, 2013; 12:30 pm, Big 12 Network		at No. 17 Oklahoma State	W 84-79 ^{OT}	16-8 (7-5)	18 – 3 tied	15 – Osby	4 – Grooms	Gallagher-Iba Arena (13,611); Stillwater, OK
February 20, 2013; 6:00 pm, ESPNU		at Texas Tech	W 86-71	17-8 (8-5)	22 – Pledger	13 – M'Baye	5 – 2 tied	United Spirit Arena (8,248); Lubbock, TX
February 23, 2013; 4:00 pm, ESPNU		Baylor	W 90-76	18-8 (9-5)	23 – Grooms	8 – Osby	4 – Grooms	Lloyd Noble Center (12,199); Norman, OK
February 27, 2013; 8:00 pm, ESPN2		at Texas	W 92-86 ^{OT}	18-9 (9-6)	31 – Osby	6 – Clark	6 – Grooms	Frank Erwin Center (9,860); Austin, TX
March 2, 2013; 12:30 pm, Big 12 Network		Iowa State	W 86-69	19-9 (10-6)	22 – Osby	9 – Osby	6 – Grooms	Lloyd Noble Center (10,789); Norman, OK
March 6, 2013; 8:00 pm, ESPN2		West Virginia	W 83-70	20-9 (11-6)	26 – Osby	8 – Pledger	10 – Grooms	Lloyd Noble Center (9,857); Norman, OK
March 9, 2013; 4:00 pm, FSSW		at TCU	W 70-67	20-10 (11-7)	19 – Osby	11 – Fitzgerald	6 – Grooms	Daniel-Meyer Coliseum (5,392); Ft. Worth, TX
2013 Big 12 tournament
March 14, 2013; 11:30, ESPN		vs. Iowa State	W 73-66	20-11 (11-7)	18 – Osby	9 – Osby	4 – Osby	Sprint Center (-); Kansas City, MO
*Non-Conference Game. Rankings from AP poll. All times are in Central Time. (#) Number seeded with region.

=== Oklahoma State ===
Date time, TV	Rank^{#}	Opponent^{#}	Result	Record	High points	High rebounds	High assists	Site (attendance) city, state
Big 12 Regular Season
January 5, 2013; 12:30 pm, Big 12 Network	No. 22	at No. 25 Kansas State	L 67–73	0–1 (10–3)	25 – Smart	7 – Jurick	2 – Smart	Bramlage Coliseum (12,528); Manhattan, KS
January 9, 2013; 7:00 pm, Big 12 Network		TCU	W 63–45	1–1 (11–3)	14 – Tied	10 – Jurick	5 – Brown	Gallagher-Iba Arena (7,502); Stillwater, OK
January 12, 2013; 2:00 pm, ESPN2		at Oklahoma	L 68–77	1–2 (11–4)	19 – Brown	8 – Jurick	3 – Smart	Lloyd Noble Center (12,695); Norman, OK
January 19, 2013; 1:00 pm, ESPN2		Texas Tech	W 79–45	2–2 (12–4)	21 – Brown	11 – Jurick	6 – Brown	Gallagher-Iba Arena (9,193); Stillwater, OK
January 21, 2013; 4:30 pm, ESPN		at Baylor	L 54–64	2–3 (12–5)	24 – Nash	10 – Smart	7 – Smart	Ferrell Center (8,039); Waco, TX
January 26, 2013; 12:00 pm, ESPNU		West Virginia	W 80–66	3–3 (13–5)	24 – Brown	12 – Jurick	5 – Brown	Gallagher-Iba Arena (7,512); Stillwater, OK
January 30, 2013; 7:00 pm, Big 12 Network		Iowa State	W 78–76	4–3 (14–5)	21 – Smart	8 – Brown	7 – Smart	Gallagher-Iba Arena (8,776); Stillwater, OK
February 2, 2013; 3:00 pm, Big 12 Network		at No. 2 Kansas	W 85–80	5–3 (15–5)	28 – Brown	9 – Smart	4 – Brown	Allen Fieldhouse (16,300); Lawrence, KS
February 6, 2013; 8:00 pm, ESPN2	No. 22	Baylor	L 67–69	6–3 (16–5)	14 – Smart	13 – Cobbins	7 – Smart	Gallagher-Iba Arena (7,547); Stillwater, OK
February 9, 2013; 12:30 pm, Big 12 Network	No. 22	at Texas	W 72–59	7–3 (17–5)	23 – Smart	9 – Nash	3 – Tied	Frank Erwin Center (14,036); Austin, TX
February 13, 2013; 6:00 pm, ESPNU	No. 17	at Texas Tech	W 91-67	18-5 (8-3)	25 – Brown	12 – Cobbins	4 – Brown	United Spirit Arena (8,671); Lubbock, TX
February 16, 2013; 12:30 pm, Big 12 Network	No. 17	Oklahoma	W 84-79 ^{OT}	19-5 (9-3)	28 – Smart	7 – Smart	4 – Smart	Gallagher-Iba Arena (13,611); Stillwater, OK
February 20, 2013; 8:00 pm, ESPN2	No. 9	No. 14 Kansas	W 68-67 ^{2OT}	19-6 (9-4)	20 – Brown	14 – Cobbins	4 – Brown	Gallagher-Iba Arena (13,611); Stillwater, OK
February 23, 2013; 1:00 pm, ESPN2	No. 14	at West Virginia	W 73-57	20-6 (10-4)	16 – 2 tied	9 – Cobbins	4 – Smart	WVU Coliseum (10,038); Morgantown, WV
February 27, 2013; 6:00 pm, ESPNU	No. 15	at TCU	W 64-47	21-6 (11-4)	28 – Nash	6 – 2 tied	5 – Smart	Daniel-Meyer Coliseum (7,046); Ft. Worth, TX
March 2, 2013; 3:00 pm, ESPN	No. 15	Texas	W 78-65	22-6 (12-4)	18 – Brown	6 – 3 tied	3 – 2 tied	Gallagher-Iba Arena (12,474); Stillwater, OK
March 6, 2013; 6:00 pm, ESPNU	No. 13	at Iowa State	W 87-76	22-7 (12-5)	24 – Smart	8 – Smart	3 – 3 tied	Hilton Coliseum (14,011); Ames, IA
March 9, 2013; 12:30 pm, Big 12 Network	No. 13	No. 9 Kansas State	W 76-70	23-7 (13-5)	24 – Nash	8 – Jurick	6 – Smart	Gallagher-Iba Arena (13,611); Stillwater, OK
2013 Big 12 tournament
March 14, 2013; 8:30pm, ESPN	No. 14	vs. Baylor	W 74-72	24-7 (13-5)	21 – Smart	8 – Cobbins	3 – Brown	Sprint Center (17,257); Kansas City, MO
March 13–16, 2013; 9pm, ESPN	No. 14	vs. No. 11 Kansas State	W 68-57	24-8 (13-5)	18 – Smart	6 – 3 tied	3 – Smart	Sprint Center (19,160); Kansas City, MO
*Non-Conference Game. Rankings from AP poll. All times are in Central Time. (#) Number seeded with region.

=== TCU ===
Date time, TV	Rank^{#}	Opponent^{#}	Result	Record	High points	High rebounds	High assists	Site (attendance) city, state
Big 12 Regular season
January 5, 2013; 5:00 pm, FSSW		Texas Tech	L 53–62	9-5 (0-1)	16 – Abron	9 – Crossland	5 – Anderson	Daniel-Meyer Coliseum (5,448); Fort Worth, TX
January 9, 2013; 7:00 pm, Big 12 Network		at Oklahoma State	L 45–63	9-6 (0-2)	20 – Green	6 – McKinney	3 – Anderson	Gallagher-Iba Arena (5,448); Stillwater, OK
January 12, 2013; 5:00 pm, FSSW		at Baylor	L 40–51	9-7 (0-3)	12 – Hill	8 – Tied	3 – Anderson	Ferrell Center (7,753); Waco, TX
January 16, 2013; 8:00 pm, ESPNU		Kansas State	L 54–67	9-8 (0-4)	18 – McKinney	9 – McKinney	4 – Green	Daniel-Meyer Coliseum (4,872); Fort Worth, TX
January 19, 2013; 12:30 pm, Big 12 Network		Iowa State	L 50–63	9-9 (0-5)	10 – Tied	6 – Green	3 – Anderson	Daniel-Meyer Coliseum (4,753); Fort Worth, TX
January 23, 2013; 6:30 pm, ESPN2		at West Virginia	L 50–71	9-10 (0-6)	19 – Anderson	7 – Crossland	4 – Green	WVU Coliseum (7,094); Morgantown, WV
January 26, 2013; 3:00 pm, Big 12 Network		Baylor	L 56–82	9-11 (0-7)	15 – McKinney	8 – McKinney	3 – Anderson	Daniel-Meyer Coliseum (6,277); Fort Worth, TX
February 2, 2013; 7:00 pm, LHN		at Texas	L 43–60	9-12 (0-8)	13 – McKinney	12 – Crossland	3 – Anderson	Frank Erwin Center (11,641); Austin, TX
February 6, 2013; 6:00 pm, ESPNU		No. 5 Kansas	W 62–55	10-12 (1-8)	20 – Green	15 – Crossland	2 – Tied	Daniel-Meyer Coliseum (7,412); Fort Worth, TX
February 9, 2013; 3:00 pm, Big 12 Network		West Virginia	L 50–63	10-13 (1-9)	16 – Anderson	9 – Crossland	2 – Tied	Daniel-Meyer Coliseum (5,192); Fort Worth, TX
February 11, 2013; 6:00 pm, ESPNU		at Oklahoma	L 48–75	10-14 (1-10)	12 – Abron	9 – Abron	2 – Butler Lind	Lloyd Noble Center (8,948); Norman, OK
February 16, 2013; 12:30 pm, Big 12 Network		at Iowa State	L 53–87	10-15 (1-11)	11 – Anderson	6 – McKinney	8 – Anderson	Hilton Coliseum (14,376); Ames, IA
February 19, 2013; 7:00 pm, Big 12 Network		Texas	L 59-68	10-16 (1-12)	15 – Green	12 – Abron 11	8 – Anderson	Daniel-Meyer Coliseum; Fort Worth, TX
February 23, 2013; 3:00 pm, Big 12 Network		at No. 9 Kansas	L 48-74	10-17 (1-13)	18 – Abron	9 – Abron	3 – Zurcher	Allen Fieldhouse; Lawrence, KS
February 27, 2013; 6:00 pm, ESPNU		No. 15 Oklahoma State	L 47-64	10-18 (1-14)	15 – Anderson	9 – Abron	3 – Hill Jr.	Daniel-Meyer Coliseum; Fort Worth, TX
March 2, 2013; 2:00 pm, Big 12 Network		at Texas Tech	L 63-72	10-19 (1-15)	18 – Anderson	7 – McKinney	3 – Anderson	United Spirit Arena; Lubbock, TX
March 5, 2013; 7:00 pm, Big 12 Network		at No. 9 Kansas State	L 68-79	10-20 (1-16)	29 – Anderson	10 – McKinney	4 – Tied	Bramlage Coliseum; Manhattan, KS
March 9, 2013; 4:00 pm, FSSW		Oklahoma	W 70-67	11-20 (2-16)	18 – Green	7 – Crossland	7 – Anderson	Daniel-Meyer Coliseum; Fort Worth, TX
2013 Big 12 tournament
March 13–16, 2013; ESPN		vs. Texas	L 57-70	11-21	11 – Crossland	11 – Abron	4 – Green	Sprint Center; Kansas City, MO
*Non-conference game. Rankings from AP poll. All times are in Central Time. (#) Number seeded with region.

=== Texas ===
Date time, TV	Rank^{#}	Opponent^{#}	Result	Record	High points	High rebounds	High assists	Site (attendance) city, state
Big 12 Regular Season
January 5, 2013; 1:00 pm, ESPNU		at Baylor	L 79–86 ^{OT}	0–1 (8–6)	26 – Felix	7 – Lammert	9 – Felix	Ferrell Center (7,749); Waco, TX
January 9, 2013; 8:00 pm, ESPN2		West Virginia	L 53–57 ^{OT}	0–2 (8–7)	12 – Holmes	9 – Holmes	4 – Felix	Frank Erwin Center (9,873); Austin, TX
January 12, 2013; 1:00 pm, ESPNU		at Iowa State	L 62–82	0–3 (8–8)	15 – Tied	9 – Holmes	4 – Tied	Hilton Coliseum (14,376); Ames, IA
January 19, 2013; 1:00 pm, CBS		No. 4 Kansas	L 59–64	0–4 (8–9)	18 – McClellan	7 – Lewis	4 – Felix	Frank Erwin Center (14,312); Austin, TX
January 21, 2013; 8:30 pm, ESPN		at Oklahoma	L 67–73	0–5 (8–10)	25 – McClellan	5 – Tied	3 – Felix	Lloyd Noble Center (10,409); Norman, OK
January 26, 2013; 7:00 pm, LHN		Texas Tech	W 73–57	1–5 (9–10)	18 – Lewis	10 – Ridley	5 – Papapetrou	Frank Erwin Center (12,742); Austin, TX
January 30, 2013; 8:00 pm, ESPN2		at No. 18 Kansas State	L 57–83	1–6 (9–11)	15 – McClellan	8 – Bond	3 – Felix	Bramlage Coliseum (12,109); Manhattan, KS
February 2, 2013; 7:00 pm, LHN		TCU	W 60–43	2–6 (10–11)	15 – McClellan	9 – Papapetrou	3 – Tied	Frank Erwin Center (11,641); Austin, TX
February 6, 2013; 8:00 pm, ESPN		at West Virginia	L 58–60	2–7 (10–12)	14 – McClellan	8 – McClellan	7 – Felix	WVU Coliseum (4,966); Morgantown, WV
February 9, 2013; 12:30 pm, Big 12 Network		Oklahoma State	L 59–72	2–8 (10–13)	15 – Papapetrou	7 – Papapetrou	4 – Papapetrou	Frank Erwin Center (14,036); Austin, TX
February 13, 2013; 7:00 pm, Big 12 Network		Iowa State	W 89-86	3-8 (11-13)	18 – Mac	8 – Tied	7 – Kabongo	Frank Erwin Center; Austin, TX
February 16, 2013; 8:00 pm, ESPN		at Kansas						Allen Fieldhouse; Lawrence, KS
February 19, 2013; 7:00 pm, Big 12 Network		at TCU						Daniel-Meyer Coliseum; Ft. Worth, TX
February 23, 2013; 7:00 pm, LHN		Kansas State						Frank Erwin Center; Austin, TX
February 27, 2013; 7:00 pm, ESPN2		Oklahoma						Frank Erwin Center; Austin, TX
March 2, 2013; 2:00 pm, ESPN		at Oklahoma State						Gallagher-Iba Arena; Stillwater, OK
March 4, 2013; 8:00 pm, ESPN		Baylor						Frank Erwin Center; Austin, TX
March 9, 2013; 2:00 pm, Big 12 Network		at Texas Tech						United Spirit Arena; Lubbock, TX
2013 Big 12 tournament
March 13–16, 2013; ESPN		vs.						Sprint Center; Kansas City, MO
*Non-Conference Game. Rankings from AP poll. All times are in Central Time. (#) Number seeded with region.

=== Texas Tech ===
Date time, TV	Rank^{#}	Opponent^{#}	Result	Record	High points	High rebounds	High assists	Site (attendance) city, state
Big 12 Regular Season
January 5, 2013; 5:00 pm, FSSW		at TCU	W 62–53	1–0 (8–4)	13 – Crockett	9 – Tolbert	5 – Robinson	Daniel-Meyer Coliseum (5,448); Ft. Worth, TX
January 8, 2013; 6:00 pm, ESPN2		Baylor	L 48–82	1–1 (8–5)	13 – Crockett	7 – Gotcher	3 – Gray	United Spirit Arena (6,385); Lubbock, TX
January 12, 2013; 3:00PM, Big 12 Network		No. 6 Kansas	W 60–46	1–2 (8–6)	11 – Williams	8 – Kravic	4 – Gray	United Spirit Arena (8,534); Lubbock, TX
January 16, 2013; 7:00 pm, Big 12 Network		at Oklahoma	L 63–81	1–3 (8–7)	20 – Kravic	10 – Crockett	3 – Crockett	Lloyd Noble Center (9,178); Norman, OK
January 19, 2013; 1:00 pm, ESPN2		at Oklahoma State	L 45–79	1–4 (8–8)	11 – Crockett	7 – Crockett	2 – Robinson	Gallagher-Iba Arena (9,193); Stillwater, OK
January 23, 2013; 8:00 pm, ESPNU		Iowa State	W 56–51	2–4 (9–8)	16 – Gray	8 – Tied	4 – Gray	United Spirit Arena (7,904); Lubbock, TX
January 26, 2013; 7:00 pm, LHN		Texas	L 57–73	2–5 (9–9)	18 – Tolbert	13 – Tolbert	2 – Tied	Frank Erwin Center (12,742); Austin, TX
February 2, 2013; 12:30 pm, Big 12 Network		West Virginia	L 61–77	2–6 (9–10)	14 – Nurse	5 – Tied	5 – Gray	United Spirit Arena (8,407); Lubbock, TX
February 5, 2013; 7:00 pm, Big 12 Network		No. 13 Kansas State	L 59–68	2–7 (9–11)	19 – Tolbert	7 – Kravic	5 – Gray	United Spirit Arena (8,145); Lubbock, TX
February 9, 2013; 3:00 pm, Big 12 Network		at Baylor	L 48–75	2–8 (9–12)	8 – Williams	7 – Williams	7 – Gray	Ferrell Center (7,750); Waco, TX
February 13, 2013; 6:00 pm, ESPNU		at Oklahoma State						United Spirit Arena; Lubbock, TX
February 16, 2013; 3:00 pm, Big 12 Network		at West Virginia						WVU Coliseum; Morgantown, WV
February 20, 2013; 6:00 pm, ESPNU		Oklahoma						United Spirit Arena; Lubbock, TX
February 23, 2013; 12:30 pm, Big 12 Network		at Iowa State						Hilton Coliseum; Ames, IA
February 25, 2013; 6:00 pm, ESPNU		at Kansas State						Bramlage Coliseum; Manhattan, KS
March 2, 2013; 3:00 pm, Big 12 Network		TCU						United Spirit Arena; Lubbock, TX
March 4, 2013; 6:00 pm, ESPNU		at Kansas						Allen Fieldhouse; Manhattan, KS
March 9, 2013; 3:00 pm, Big 12 Network		Texas						United Spirit Arena; Lubbock, TX
2013 Big 12 tournament
March 13–16, 2013; ESPN		vs.						Sprint Center; Kansas City, MO
*Non-Conference Game. Rankings from AP poll. All times are in Central Time. (#) Number seeded with region.

=== West Virginia ===
Date time, TV	Rank^{#}	Opponent^{#}	Result	Record	High points	High rebounds	High assists	Site (attendance) city, state
Big 12 Regular Season
January 5, 2013; 4:00 pm, Big 12 Network		Oklahoma	L 57–67	0–1 (7–6)	21 – Henderson	6 – Kilicli	7 – Staten	WVU Coliseum (12,112); Morgantown, WV
January 9, 2013; 9:00 pm, ESPN2		at Texas	W 57–53 ^{OT}	1–1 (8–6)	12 – Murray	13 – Noreen	3 – Browne	Frank Erwin Center (9,873); Austin, TX
January 12, 2013; 1:30 pm, Big 12 Network		No. 18 Kansas State	L 64–65	1–2 (8–7)	15 – Hinds	5 – Tied	4 – Noreen	WVU Coliseum (10,039); Morgantown, WV
January 16, 2013; 9:00 pm, ESPN2		at Iowa State	L 67–69	1–3 (8–8)	20 – Hinds	10 – Noreen	7 – Staten	Hilton Coliseum (13,148); Ames, IA
January 23, 2013; 7:30 pm, ESPN2		TCU	W 70-51	2–3 (9–9)	19 – Harris	8 – Tied	3 – Hinds	WVU Coliseum (7,094); Morgantown, WV
January 26, 2013; 1:00 pm, ESPNU		at Oklahoma State	L 66–80	2–4 (9–10)	17 – Harris	10 – Murray	4 – Staten	Gallagher-Iba Arena (7,512); Stillwater, OK
January 28, 2013; 9:00 pm, ESPN		No. 2 Kansas	L 56–61	2–5 (9–11)	15 – Tied	7 – Tied	5 – Johnson	WVU Coliseum (12,402); Morgantown, WV
February 2, 2013; 1:30 pm, Big 12 Network		at Texas Tech	W 77–61	3–5 (10–11)	18 – Harris	4 – Tied	2 – Tied	United Spirit Arena (8,407); Lubbock, TX
February 4, 2013; 9:00 pm, ESPN		Texas	W 60–58	4–5 (11–11)	14 – Tied	8 – Murray	4 – Staten	WVU Coliseum (4,966); Morgantown, WV
February 9, 2013; 4:00 pm, Big 12 Network		at TCU	W 63–50	5–5 (12–11)	17 – Henderson	6 – Murray	4 – Tied	Daniel-Meyer Coliseum (5,192); Ft. Worth, TX
February 13, 2013; 9:00 pm, ESPN2		Baylor						Ferrell Center; Waco, TX
February 16, 2013; 4:00 pm, Big 12 Network		Texas Tech						WVU Coliseum; Morgantown, WV
February 18, 2013; 9:00 pm, ESPN		at Kansas State						Bramlage Coliseum; Manhattan, KS
February 23, 2013; 2:00 pm, ESPN2		Oklahoma State						WVU Coliseum; Morgantown, WV
February 27, 2013; 8:00 pm, Big 12 Network		Baylor						WVU Coliseum; Morgantown, WV
March 2, 2013; 2:00 pm, CBS		at Kansas						Allen Fieldhouse; Lawrence, KS
March 6, 2013; 9:00 pm, ESPN2		at Oklahoma						Lloyd Noble Center; Norman, OK
March 9, 2013; 1:30 pm, Big 12 Network		Iowa State						WVU Coliseum; Morgantown, WV
2013 Big 12 tournament
March 13–16, 2013; ESPN		vs.						Sprint Center; Kansas City, MO
*Non-Conference Game. Rankings from AP poll. All times are in Central Time. (#) Number seeded with region.

== Postseason ==
=== Big 12 tournament ===
- March 13–16, 2013– Big 12 Conference Basketball Tournament, Sprint Center, Kansas City, MO.

2013 Big 12 men's basketball tournament seeds and results
Seed	School	Conf.	Over.	Tiebreaker	First Round March 13	Quarterfinals March 14	Semifinals March 15	Championship March 16
1.	‡Kansas	14–4	29–5	2–0 vs KSST	Bye	#9 Texas Tech	#5 Iowa State	#2 Kansas State
2.	†Kansas State	14–4	27–7	0–2 vs KAN	Bye	#7 Texas	#3 Oklahoma State	#1 Kansas
3.	†Oklahoma State	13–5	24–8		Bye	#6 Baylor	#2 Kansas State	
4.	†Oklahoma	11–7	20–11	1–1 vs IAST; 1–1 vs KAN	Bye	#5 Iowa State		
5.	†Iowa State	11–7	22–11	1–1 vs OKLA; 0–2 vs KAN	Bye	#4 Oklahoma	#1 Kansas	
6.	†Baylor	9–9	18–14		Bye	#3 Oklahoma State		
7.	Texas	7–11	16–17		#10 TCU	#2 Kansas State		
8.	West Virginia	6–12	13–19		#9 Texas Tech			
9.	Texas Tech	3–15	11–20		#8 West Virginia	#1 Kansas		
10.	TCU	2–16	11–21		#7 Texas			
‡ – Big 12 regular season champions, and tournament No. 1 seed. † – Received a single-bye in the conference tournament. Overall records include all games played in the Big 12 tournament.

=== NCAA tournament ===
Seed	Region	School	Second Round	Third Round	Sweet 16	Elite Eight	Final Four	Championship
1	South	Kansas	#16 Western Kentucky - Mar. 22, Kansas City - W, 64–57	#8 North Carolina - Mar. 24, Kansas City - W, 70–58	#4 Michigan - Mar. 29, Arlington - L, 85–87			
4	West	Kansas State	#13 La Salle - Mar. 22, Kansas City - L, 61–63					
5	Midwest	Oklahoma State	#12 Oregon - Mar. 21, San Jose - L, 55–68					
10	West	Iowa State	#7 Notre Dame - Mar. 22, Dayton - W, 76–58	#2 Ohio State - Mar. 24, Dayton - L, 75–78				
10	South	Oklahoma	#7 San Diego State - Mar. 22, Philadelphia - L, 55–70					
	5 Bids	W-L (%):	2–3 .400	1–1 .500	0–1 .000	0–0 –	0–0 –	TOTAL: 3–5 .375

=== National Invitation tournament ===
Seed	Bracket	School	First Round	Second Round	Quarterfinals	Semifinals	Finals
2	Kentucky	Baylor	#7 Long Beach State - Mar. 20, Waco - W, 112–66	#3 Arizona State - Mar. 22, Waco - W, 89–86	#4 Providence - Mar. 27, Waco - W, 79–68	#3 BYU - Apr. 2, New York - W, 76–70	#3 Iowa - Apr. 4, New York - W, 74–54
	1 Bid	W-L (%):	1–0 1.000	1–0 1.000	1–0 1.000	1–0 1.000	TOTAL: 5–0 1.000

=== College Basketball Invitational ===
School	First Round	Quarterfinals	Semifinals	Finals
Texas	Houston - Mar. 20, Houston - L, 72–73			
W-L (%):	0–1 .000	0–0 –	0–0 –	TOTAL: 0–1 .000

=== NBA draft ===
Several players from the conference declared early for the NBA draft. Several players were among the 60 players invited to the 2013 NBA Draft Combine. The following conference players were drafted:

- Ben McLemore, Sacramento Kings, 1st round, 7th overall
- Jeff Withey, Portland Trail Blazers, 2nd round, 39th overall
- Pierre Jackson, Philadelphia 76ers, 2nd round, 42nd overall
- Romero Osby, Orlando Magic, 2nd round, 51st overall

== Honors and awards ==
=== All-Americans ===
Consensus Second Team
Player	Position	Class	Team
Ben McLemore	SG	Freshman	Kansas
Marcus Smart	PG	Freshman	Oklahoma State
Jeff Withey	C	Senior	Kansas

=== All-Big 12 Awards and Teams ===
- Player of the Year: Marcus Smart, Oklahoma State
- Defensive Player of the Year: Jeff Withey, Kansas
- Newcomer of the Year: Will Clyburn, Iowa State
- Freshman of the Year: Marcus Smart, Oklahoma State
- Sixth Man Award: Tyrus McGee, Iowa State
- Scholar-Athlete of the Year: Melvin Ejim, Iowa State
- Coach of the Year: Bruce Weber, Kansas State

All-Big 12 First Team

- Ben McLemore, Kansas, G
- Jeff Withey, Kansas, C
- Rodney McGruder, Kansas State, G
- Romero Osby, Oklahoma, F
- Marcus Smart, Oklahoma State, G

All-Big 12 Second Team

- Pierre Jackson, Baylor, G
- Will Clyburn, Iowa State, G
- Travis Releford, Kansas, G
- Ángel Rodríguez, Kansas State, G
- Markel Brown, Oklahoma State, G

All-Big 12 Third Team

- Isaiah Austin, Baylor, C
- Melvin Ejim, Iowa State, F
- Amath M'Baye, Oklahoma, F
- Steven Pledger, Oklahoma, G
- Le'Bryan Nash, Oklahoma State, G/F

All-Big 12 Honorable Mention

- Cory Jefferson (Baylor)
- Korie Lucious (Iowa State)
- Tyrus McGee (Iowa State)
- Elijah Johnson (Kansas)
- Shane Southwell (Kansas State)
- Michael Cobbins (Oklahoma State)
- Jaye Crockett (Texas Tech)
- Eron Harris (West Virginia)
- Deniz Kilicli (West Virginia)

Big 12 All-Defensive Team

- Chris Babb, Iowa State, G
- Travis Releford, Kansas, G
- Jeff Withey, Kansas, C
- Angel Rodriguez, Kansas State, G
- Michael Cobbins, Oklahoma State, F
- Marcus Smart, Oklahoma State, G

Big 12 All-Rookie Team

- Isaiah Austin, Baylor, C
- Will Clyburn, Iowa State, G
- Georges Niang, Iowa State, F
- Ben McLemore, Kansas, G
- Amath M'Baye, Oklahoma, F
- Marcus Smart, Oklahoma State, G
