= 2012–13 Texas Tech Red Raiders basketball team =

American college basketball season

2012–13 Texas Tech Red Raiders basketball
- Conference: Big 12
- Record: 11–20 (3–15 Big 12)
- Head coach: Chris Walker (interim; 1st season)
- Assistant coaches: Jeremy Cox (1st season); Bubba Jennings (5th season)
- Home arena: United Spirit Arena

2012–13 Big 12 men's basketball standings
	Conf.				Overall
Team	W		L	PCT	W		L	PCT
No. 3 Kansas †	14	–	4	.778	31	–	6	.838
No. 12 Kansas State	14	–	4	.778	27	–	8	.771
No. 17 Oklahoma State	13	–	5	.722	24	–	9	.727
Oklahoma	11	–	7	.611	20	–	12	.625
Iowa State	11	–	7	.611	23	–	12	.657
Baylor	9	–	9	.500	23	–	14	.622
Texas	7	–	11	.389	16	–	18	.471
West Virginia	6	–	12	.333	13	–	19	.406
Texas Tech	3	–	15	.167	11	–	20	.355
TCU	2	–	16	.111	11	–	21	.344
† 2013 Big 12 Tournament winner Rankings from AP poll

The 2012–13 Texas Tech Red Raiders basketball team represented Texas Tech University in the 2012–13 NCAA Division I men's basketball season. The team, led by interim head coach Chris Walker, played its home games at the United Spirit Arena in Lubbock, Texas and were members of the Big 12 Conference. They finished the season 11–20, 3–15 in Big 12 play to finish in ninth place. They lost in the quarterfinals of the Big 12 tournament to Kansas.

== Pre-season ==
=== Departures ===
Name	Number	Pos.	Height	Weight	Year	Hometown	Notes
Robert Lewandowski	15	F	6'10"	256	Senior	Overland Park, Kansas	Graduated

In addition to departing players, Texas Tech came to the spotlight on Friday, September 7 when head coach Billy Gillispie was hospitalized for undisclosed medical reasons. That same day, Texas Tech officials announced that Gillispie was being investigated for possible player misconduct. Gillispie would be discharged from the hospital on Wednesday, September 5. A few days later, Monday, September 10, an ambulance was sent to the home of Gillispie. Gillispie was once again sent to the hospital for an undisclosed medical reason. On Thursday, September 13, Gillispie resigned as head coach of Texas Tech, citing he was leaving for health reasons.

=== Recruits ===
College recruiting
Name	Hometown	School	Height	Weight	Commit date
Wanaah Bail; PF	Rosenberg, TX	Lamar Consolidated	6 ft 8 in (2.03 m)	205 lb (93 kg)	Feb 13, 2012
Wanaah Bail; PF	Recruit ratings: Scout: Rivals: (89)				
Michael Carey; SF	Rosenberg, TX	Lamar Consolidated	6 ft 5 in (1.96 m)	190 lb (86 kg)	Feb 13, 2012
Michael Carey; SF	Recruit ratings: Scout: Rivals: (88)				
Josh Gray; PG	Houston, TX	Wheatley	6 ft 1 in (1.85 m)	175 lb (79 kg)	Apr 30, 2012
Josh Gray; PG	Recruit ratings: Scout: Rivals: (91)				
Dusty Hannahs; SG	Little Rock, AR	Pulaski Academy	6 ft 3 in (1.91 m)	200 lb (91 kg)	Sep 19, 2011
Dusty Hannahs; SG	Recruit ratings: Scout: Rivals: (88)				
Trency Jackson; SG	Niceville, FL	Northwest Florida State College	6 ft 2 in (1.88 m)	185 lb (84 kg)	Apr 16, 2012
Trency Jackson; SG	Recruit ratings: Scout: Rivals: (JC)				
Daylen Robinson; PG	Moberly, MO	Moberly Area CC	5 ft 10 in (1.78 m)	170 lb (77 kg)	Sep 20, 2011
Daylen Robinson; PG	Recruit ratings: Scout: Rivals: (JC)				
Aaron Ross; PF	Little Rock, AR	St. John's NW Military	6 ft 7 in (2.01 m)	220 lb (100 kg)	Mar 7, 2012
Aaron Ross; PF	Recruit ratings: Scout: Rivals: (POST)				
Rodrigo Silva; PF	Cheyenne, WY	Laramie County CC	6 ft 11 in (2.11 m)	225 lb (102 kg)	Oct 28, 2011
Rodrigo Silva; PF	Recruit ratings: Scout: Rivals: (JC)				
Jamal Williams; PG	Mattoon, IL	Lake Land College	6 ft 3 in (1.91 m)	185 lb (84 kg)	Nov 7, 2011
Jamal Williams; PG	Recruit ratings: Scout: Rivals: (JC)				
Overall recruit ranking: Scout: Not Ranked Top 30 Rivals: Not Ranked Top 25 ESPN: Not Ranked Top 50
Note: In many cases, Scout, Rivals, 247Sports, On3, and ESPN may conflict in their listings of height and weight.; In these cases, the average was taken. ESPN grades are on a 100-point scale.; Sources: "Texas Tech 2012 Basketball Commitments". Rivals.; "2012 Texas Tech Basketball Commits". Scout.; "ESPN". ESPN.; "Scout.com Team Recruiting Rankings". Scout.; "2012 Team Ranking". Rivals.

== Roster ==
2012–13 Texas Tech Red Raiders men's basketball team
Players
Coaches

Pos.	#	Name	Height	Weight	Year	Previous school	Hometown
G	1	Trency Jackson	6 ft 2 in (1.88 m)	185 lb (84 kg)	So	Wingfield; Northwest Florida State	Jackson, MS
G	2	Dusty Hannahs	6 ft 4 in (1.93 m)	210 lb (95 kg)	Fr	Pulaski Academy	Little Rock, AR
G	4	Ty Nurse	6 ft 1 in (1.85 m)	185 lb (84 kg)	Sr	St. Mary's Catholic; Midland College	Vancouver, British Columbia
G	5	Josh Gray	6 ft 1 in (1.85 m)	175 lb (79 kg)	Fr	Houston Wheatley	Lake Charles, LA
G	10	Daylen Robinson	6 ft 0 in (1.83 m)	175 lb (79 kg)	Jr	Northeast; Moberly Area C.C.	Kansas City, MO
F	11	Dejan Kravic	6 ft 11 in (2.11 m)	240 lb (109 kg)	RS Jr	Westminster; York	London, ON
F	12	Kader Tapsoba	6 ft 10 in (2.08 m)	222 lb (101 kg)	RS Jr	Africa; Tyler JC	Ouagadougou, BUR
G	13	Luke Adams	5 ft 9 in (1.75 m)	170 lb (77 kg)	So	Big Spring	Big Spring, TX
F	15	Aaron Ross	6 ft 8 in (2.03 m)	235 lb (107 kg)	Fr	Parkview; Delafield St. John NW Military	Little Rock, AR
G	20	Toddrick Gotcher	6 ft 4 in (1.93 m)	195 lb (88 kg)	RS Fr	Lakeview Centennial	Garland, TX
G	23	Jamal Williams, Jr.	6 ft 4 in (1.93 m)	190 lb (86 kg)	Jr	Pacific; Lake Land College	Brooklyn, NY
F	30	Jaye Crockett	6 ft 7 in (2.01 m)	200 lb (91 kg)	RS Jr	Clovis	Clovis, NM
F	32	Jordan Tolbert	6 ft 7 in (2.01 m)	225 lb (102 kg)	So	All Saints Episcopal	Fort Worth, TX
F	35	Clark Lammert	6 ft 8 in (2.03 m)	210 lb (95 kg)	So	Churchill	San Antonio, TX

Head coach

- Chris Walker (Villanova)

Assistant coach(es)

- Jeremy Cox (Colorado Mesa)
- Bubba Jennings (Texas Tech)

Legend

- (C) Team captain
- (S) Suspended
- (I) Ineligible
- (W) Walk-on
- Injured
- Current redshirt

Roster
Last update: 2011-04-01

== Schedule ==
Date time, TV	Opponent	Result	Record	Site (attendance) city, state
Exhibition
11/01/2012*; 7:00 pm	UTPB	W 88–63	–	United Spirit Arena (8,083); Lubbock, TX
Non-conference regular season
11/09/2012*; 8:00 pm, FCS	Prairie View A&M	W 89–79	1–0	United Spirit Arena (8,550); Lubbock, TX
11/14/2012*; 7:00 pm, FSSW+	Nebraska–Omaha	W 91–63	2–0	United Spirit Arena (7,053); Lubbock, TX
11/20/2012*; 8:00 pm, FSSW	Grambling State	W 91–56	3–0	United Spirit Arena (7,952); Lubbock, TX
11/26/2012*; 7:00 pm, FSSW	Jackson State	W 84–75	4–0	United Spirit Arena (7,404); Lubbock, TX
12/01/2012*; 7:00 pm, ESPNU	No. 9 Arizona	L 57–85	4–1	United Spirit Arena (10,782); Lubbock, TX
12/04/2012*; 6:00 pm, FSSW	Northern Kentucky	W 75–69	5–1	United Spirit Arena (7,758); Lubbock, TX
12/16/2012*; 5:00 pm, FSSW	McNeese State	L 75–80	5–2	United Spirit Arena (6,144); Lubbock, TX
12/19/2012*; 7:00 pm, ESPN3	Alabama	L 62–66	5–3	United Spirit Arena (7,172); Lubbock, TX
12/22/2012*; 1:00 pm, FCS	Arizona State	L 62–77	5–4	United Spirit Arena (7,732); Lubbock, TX
12/28/2012*; 6:00 pm, FSSW+	North Carolina A&T	W 85–74	6–4	United Spirit Arena (5,893); Lubbock, TX
12/31/2012*; 12:00 pm, FSSW	Florida A&M	W 70–56	7–4	United Spirit Arena (5,404); Lubbock, TX
Big 12 Regular Season
01/05/2013; 5:00 pm, FSSW	at TCU	W 62–53	8–4 (1–0)	Daniel-Meyer Coliseum (5,448); Ft. Worth, TX
01/08/2013; 6:00 pm, ESPN2	Baylor	L 48–82	8–5 (1–1)	United Spirit Arena (6,385); Lubbock, TX
01/12/2013; 3:00 pm, Big 12 Network	No. 6 Kansas	L 46–60	8–6 (1–2)	United Spirit Arena (8,534); Lubbock, TX
01/16/2013; 7:00 pm, Big 12 Network	at Oklahoma	L 63–81	8–7 (1–3)	Lloyd Noble Center (9,178); Norman, OK
01/19/2013; 1:00 pm, ESPN2	at Oklahoma State	L 45–79	8–8 (1–4)	Gallagher-Iba Arena (9,193); Stillwater, OK
01/23/2013; 8:00 pm, ESPNU	Iowa State	W 56–51	9–8 (2–4)	United Spirit Arena (7,904); Lubbock, TX
01/26/2013; 7:00 pm, LHN	Texas	L 57–73	9–9 (2–5)	Frank Erwin Center (12,742); Austin, TX
02/02/2013; 12:45 pm, Big 12 Network	West Virginia	L 61–77	9–10 (2–6)	United Spirit Arena (8,407); Lubbock, TX
02/05/2013; 7:00 pm, Big 12 Network	No. 13 Kansas State	L 59–68	9–11 (2–7)	United Spirit Arena (8,145); Lubbock, TX
02/09/2013; 3:00 pm, Big 12 Network	at Baylor	L 48–75	9–12 (2–8)	Ferrell Center (7,750); Waco, TX
02/13/2013; 6:00 pm, ESPNU	at No. 17 Oklahoma State	L 67–91	9–13 (2–9)	United Spirit Arena (8,671); Lubbock, TX
02/16/2013; 3:00 pm, Big 12 Network	at West Virginia	L 64–66	9–14 (2–10)	WVU Coliseum (10,530); Morgantown, WV
02/20/2013; 6:00 pm, ESPNU	Oklahoma	L 71–86	9–15 (2–11)	United Spirit Arena (8,248); Lubbock, TX
02/23/2013; 12:45 pm, Big 12 Network	at Iowa State	L 66–86	9–16 (2–12)	Hilton Coliseum (14,376); Ames, IA
02/25/2013; 6:00 pm, ESPNU	at No. 13 Kansas State	L 55–75	9–17 (2–13)	Bramlage Coliseum (12,216); Manhattan, KS
03/02/2013; 3:00 pm, Big 12 Network	TCU	W 72–63	10–17 (3–13)	United Spirit Arena (9,372); Lubbock, TX
03/04/2013; 6:00 pm, ESPNU	at No. 4 Kansas	L 42–79	10–18 (3–14)	Allen Fieldhouse (16,300); Manhattan, KS
03/09/2013; 3:00 pm, Big 12 Network	Texas	L 69–71 ^{OT}	10–19 (3–15)	United Spirit Arena (9,542); Lubbock, TX
2013 Big 12 men's basketball tournament
03/13/2013; 6:00 pm, Big 12 Network/ESPN3	vs. West Virginia; First Round	W 71–69	11–19	Sprint Center (17,018); Kansas City, MO
03/14/2013; 2:00 pm, ESPN2	vs. No. 7 Kansas; Quarterfinals	L 63–91	11–20	Sprint Center (17,996); Kansas City, MO
*Non-conference game. ^{#}Rankings from AP Poll. (#) Tournament seedings in parentheses. All times are in Central Time.
