= St. Raymond Academy =

St. Raymond Academy for Girls
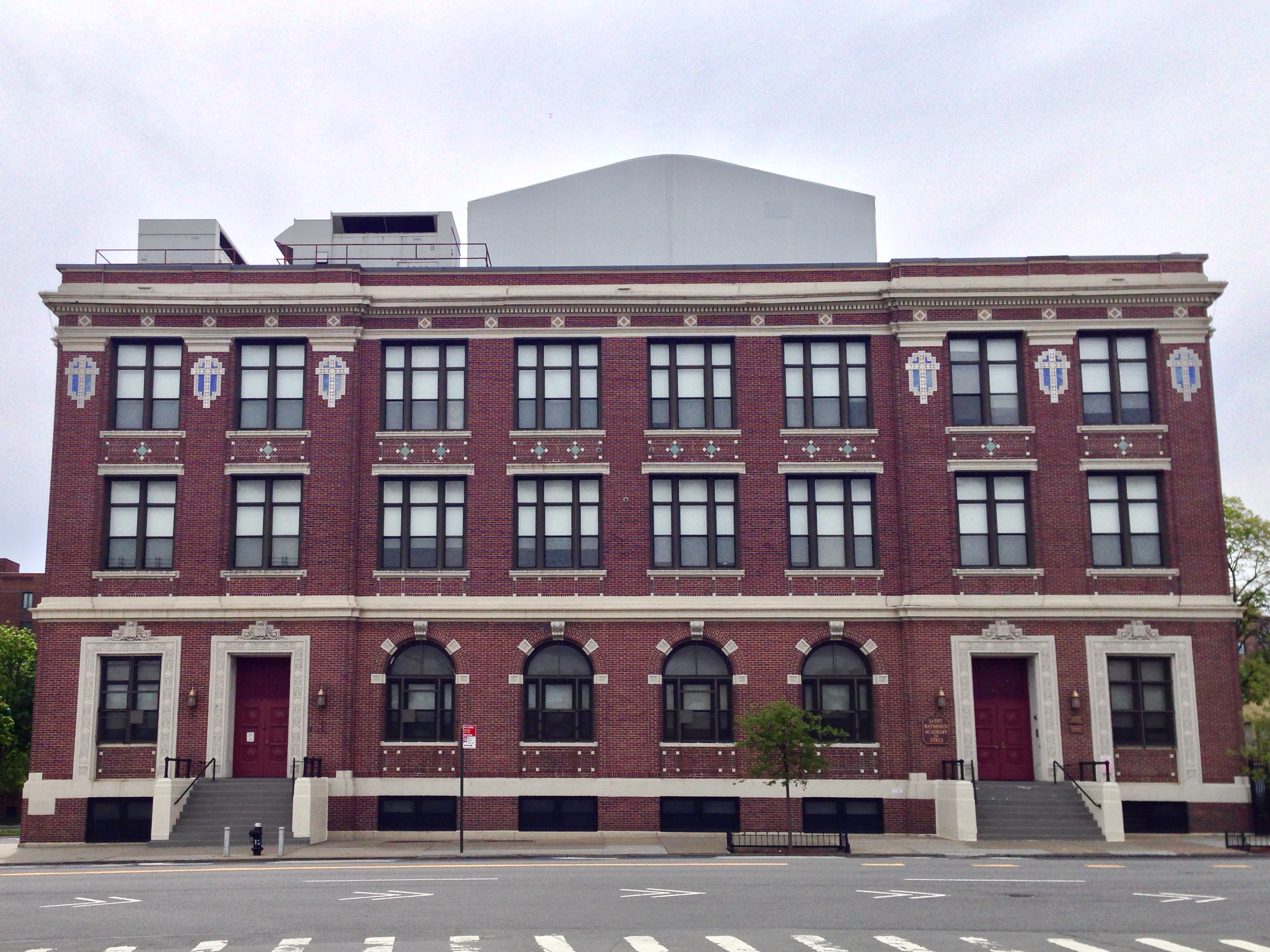

Location
- 1725 Castle Hill Avenue, Parkchester; Bronx, New York 10462; United States; 40°50′31″N 73°51′16″W

Information
- Type: Private high school
- Motto: Commitment to Excellence
- Religious affiliation: Roman Catholic
- Established: 1960; 66 years ago
- Founders: Sisters of Charity of New York
- Oversight: Roman Catholic Archdiocese of New York
- NCES School ID: 00922692
- Principal: Sr. Maureen Flynn
- Teaching staff: 24.0 (on an FTE basis)
- Grades: 9–12
- Gender: Girls
- Enrollment: 311 (2015–2016)
- Student to teacher ratio: 13.0
- Colors: Blue, white
- Team name: Lady Ravens
- Accreditation: Middle States Association of Colleges and Schools
- Website: straymondacademy.org

St. Raymond Academy for Girls is an American private, Roman Catholic high school for girls, located in the Parkchester neighborhood of the Bronx, New York.

It was established in 1960 by the Sisters of Charity and is located in the Roman Catholic Archdiocese of New York.

The school has been accredited by the Board of Regents of the University of the State of New York since 1965.

The Middle States Commission on Secondary Schools first granted the academy accreditation effective 2003–2010. In 2009–2010, the academy completed the review for re-accreditation and received the renewal of certification. Accreditation was renewed until December 2017.

== History ==
St. Raymond Academy was established in 1960 by the Sisters of Charity, a congregation of religious women in the Catholic Church whose primary missions are education and nursing. For nearly 200 years, the Sisters of Charity of New York have served the needs of the poor.

The congregation's history began with its foundress, Elizabeth Ann Seton, who was later canonized as the first American-born saint.

Since the school opened its doors, its motto has been "Commitment to Excellence".

It began as a small, parish-based high school with an enrollment of 95 students. John Corrigan, the pastor at the time, appointed Regina Angela, a Sister of Charity of St. Vincent de Paul Church (in Manhattan), as the first principal.

The school occupied the third floor of the school building built in 1952 and through the years has prided itself on serving a relatively small school population.

In order to better meet its educational goals, the school was recognized with a charter by the Board of Regents of the University of the State of New York in 1965. It received an additional accreditation by the Middle States Association of Colleges and Schools in 2003, which was recently renewed.

The Sisters of Charity were joined through the years by the Dominican Sisters of Blauvelt, the Dominican Sisters of Sparkill, the Sisters of Mercy, Sisters of the Holy Child, and lay women and men.
