= Durand Scott =

American basketball player (born 1990)

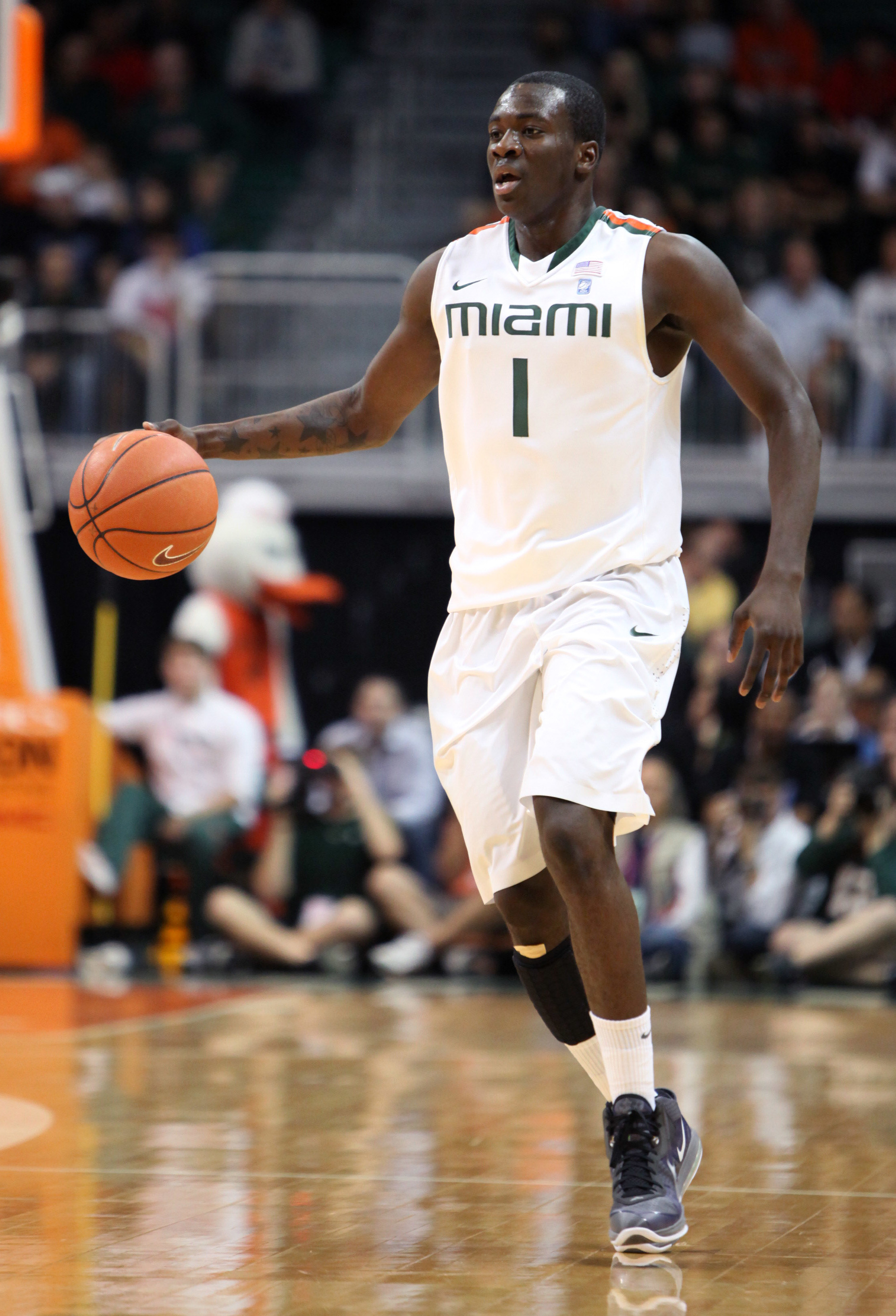
- Scott playing for the Miami Hurricanes in 2011

Personal information
- Born: February 22, 1990 (age 36) New York City, New York, U.S.
- Listed height: 6 ft 5 in (1.96 m)
- Listed weight: 203 lb (92 kg)

Career information
- High school: Rice (New York City, New York)
- College: Miami (Florida) (2009–2013)
- NBA draft: 2013: undrafted
- Playing career: 2013–2023
- Position: Shooting guard

Career history
- 2013–2014: Obradoiro CAB
- 2014–2015: Hapoel Tel Aviv
- 2015–2016: Brindisi
- 2016: Vaqueros de Bayamón
- 2016–2017: Brindisi
- 2017–2018: Memphis Hustle
- 2018: Oldenburg
- 2018–2019: Levallois Metropolitans
- 2019: Hapoel Gilboa Galil
- 2020: SZTE-Szedeák
- 2020–2022: Maccabi Ashdod
- 2022–2023: Oviedo CB

Career highlights
- ACC Defensive Player of the Year (2013); ACC All-Defensive Team (2013); Third-team Parade All-American (2009)
- Stats at Basketball Reference

Durand Christopher Scott (born February 22, 1990) is a Jamaican-American former professional basketball player. Born in New York City, Scott played for Rice High School, before enrolling in the University of Miami in 2009. In 2013, he won the ACC tournament with the Hurricanes, and he was named ACC Defensive Player of the Year. Following his graduation he played professionally in Spain, Israel, Italy, Puerto Rico, Germany and France. Internationally he has represented Jamaica in the 2013 FIBA Americas Championship.

== High school career ==
The Bronx native attended Rice High School where he was a teammate of Kemba Walker until the latter left for college. He was crucial in their state championship earned in 2009, including a good performance in the semifinal against a Lance Stephenson led Lincoln won 77–50. For his efforts, he was selected as the Daily News City Player of the Year, and was selected to the Jordan Brand Classic. During that time, he also played AAU basketball for the Gauchos.

== College career ==
He passed up offers from Memphis, West Virginia, and UConn to play at the University of Miami in the ACC of NCAA Division I.

In his freshman year, Scott played in all 33 games (28 starts) while averaging 10.3 points, 4 rebounds, 3.4 assists and a team-high 1.2 steals per game. He made the ACC All-Rookie team and the ACC All-tournament First Team.

In his sophomore year, he started in all but one of the 36 games he played in, averaging 13.6 points (second-best on team), 4.2 rebounds, 3.1 assists and a 1.2 steals (best) in 32.8 minutes (most) per game.

In his junior year, he played 33.2 minutes per game (6th most in ACC), posting 12.9 (ACC 14th, team best), 3.1 assists (ACC 7th), 5.4 rebounds (team second best) and 1 steal. He was an All-ACC Honorable Mention.

He scored a career-high 32 points versus NC State in the 2013 ACC Tournament semi-finals. In his senior year, had 13.1 points and 4 rebounds. He was named ACC Defensive Player of the Year and selected to the ACC All-Tournament First Team as Miami won the Tournament.

At the end of his college career, he averaged 12.5 points, 4.4 rebounds, 3.1 assists, 1.3 steals and 32.1 minutes in 132 total games played. He was first in Miami history for games started and minutes played (125 and 4,238 respectively), 8th in points scored (1,650), 5th in assists (404) and 7th in steals (166).

== Professional career ==
After his college career, Scott attended the Portsmouth Invitational, where he was an all-tournament selection. He also worked out with a number of NBA teams, but went undrafted in the 2013 NBA draft. Scott then joined the San Antonio Spurs for the 2013 NBA Summer League.

In August 2013, Scott signed with Blu:sens Monbús of the Spanish Liga ACB for the 2013–14 season. He registered 4.6 points and 1.2 rebounds in 12.3 minutes per game during the season.

Scott signed with Israeli side Hapoel Tel Aviv for the 2014–15 season, he finished the season with 15.2 points, 4.5 rebounds and 1.5 steals in 31 Israeli League games as Hapoel reached the playoffs.

In July 2015, Scott signed with Italian Serie A side Enel Brindisi for one year. The same month, he was announced as part of the Milwaukee Bucks roster for the 2015 NBA Summer League. On July 22, 2016, he re-signed with Brindisi for one more season.

On July 15, 2017, Scott signed with Italian club Auxilium Torino for the 2017–18 season. On August 20, 2017, it was announced that the player won't play with the team for personal reasons. On October 5, 2017, he signed with the Memphis Grizzlies. On October 14, 2017, he was waived by the Grizzlies. On March 29, 2018, EWE Baskets Oldenburg of the Basketball Bundesliga was reported to have signed Scott for the rest of 2017–18 season.

For the 2018–19 season, Scott signed with the Long Island Nets of the NBA G League. He did not make the final roster.

On November 28, 2018, Scott signed a one-year deal with the French team Levallois Metropolitans. In January 2019, Scott parted ways with Levallois Metropolitans after appearing in five games.

On January 22, 2019, Scott returned to Israel for a second stint, signing with Hapoel Gilboa Galil for the rest of the season. On February 4, 2019, Scott recorded a season-high 25 points in his second game with Gilboa Galil, shooting 9-for-12 from the field, along with three rebounds and assists in an 89–87 win over Ironi Nahariya. On April 10, 2019, Scott parted ways after appearing in nine games.

On August 30, 2019, Scott returned to France for a second stint, signing a one-year deal with Cholet Basket. On September 17, 2019, he parted ways with Cholet before appearing in a game.

On February 20, 2020, he has signed with SZTE-Szedeák of the NB I/A.

== National team career ==
Scott has played for the Jamaica national team. He participated in the 2013 FIBA Americas Championship, posting 10.5 points, 3.9 rebounds and 0.8 assists in around 28 minutes per game.
