= 2012–13 Georgia Tech Yellow Jackets men's basketball team =

American college basketball season

2012–13 Georgia Tech Yellow Jackets men's basketball
- Conference: Atlantic Coast Conference
- Record: 16–15 (6–12 ACC)
- Head coach: Brian Gregory (2nd season)
- Assistant coaches: Chad Dollar; Josh Postorino; Billy Schmidt
- Home arena: McCamish Pavilion

2012–13 ACC men's basketball standings
	Conf.				Overall
Team	W		L	PCT	W		L	PCT
No. 5 Miami (FL) †	15	–	3	.833	29	–	7	.806
No. 6 Duke	14	–	4	.778	30	–	6	.833
North Carolina	12	–	6	.667	25	–	11	.694
Virginia	11	–	7	.611	23	–	12	.657
NC State	11	–	7	.611	24	–	11	.686
Florida State	9	–	9	.500	18	–	16	.529
Maryland	8	–	10	.444	25	–	13	.658
Boston College	7	–	11	.389	16	–	17	.485
Georgia Tech	6	–	12	.333	16	–	15	.516
Wake Forest	6	–	12	.333	13	–	18	.419
Clemson	5	–	13	.278	13	–	18	.419
Virginia Tech	4	–	14	.222	13	–	19	.406
† 2013 ACC tournament winner As of April 2, 2013; Rankings from AP Poll

The 2012–13 Georgia Tech Yellow Jackets men's basketball team represented the Georgia Institute of Technology during the 2012–13 NCAA Division I men's basketball season. The Yellow Jackets, led by second-year head coach Brian Gregory, were members of the Atlantic Coast Conference. The Yellow Jackets played their home games at the newly remodeled and renamed McCamish Pavilion. They finished the season 16–15, 6–12 in ACC play to finish in a tie for ninth place. They lost in the first round of the ACC tournament to Boston College.

== Departures ==
Name	Number	Pos.	Height	Weight	Year	Hometown	Notes
Pierre Jordan	2	G	6'0"	170	Senior	Dunwoody, GA	Graduated
Nick Foreman	4	G	6'3"	210	Senior	Bellaire, TX	Graduated
McPherson Moore	13	G	6'3"	200	Sophomore	St. Louis, MO	Transferred
Derek Craig	33	G	6'4"	205	Senior	Spring, TX	Graduated
Glen Rice Jr.	41	G	6'5"	206	Junior	Marietta, GA	Dismissed
Nate Hicks	42	C	6'10"	218	Sophomore	Panama City Beach, FL	Transferred

== Roster ==
2012–13 Georgia Tech Yellow Jackets men's basketball team
Players
Coaches

Pos.	#	Name	Height	Weight	Year	Hometown
G	0	Mfon Udofia	6 ft 2 in (1.88 m)	195 lb (88 kg)	Sr	Stone Mountain, Georgia
F	1	Julian Royal	6 ft 8 in (2.03 m)	243 lb (110 kg)	So	Alpharetta, Georgia
G	2	Pierre Jordan	6 ft 0 in (1.83 m)	165 lb (75 kg)	GS	Dunwoody, Georgia
G/F	3	Marcus Georges-Hunt	6 ft 5 in (1.96 m)	218 lb (99 kg)	Fr	College Park, Georgia
F	4	Robert Carter	6 ft 8 in (2.03 m)	245 lb (111 kg)	Fr	Thomasville, Georgia
C	5	Daniel Miller	6 ft 11 in (2.11 m)	257 lb (117 kg)	Jr	Loganville, Georgia
G	11	Chris Bolden	6 ft 3 in (1.91 m)	209 lb (95 kg)	Fr	Tifton, Georgia
G	12	Stacey Pool, Jr.	6 ft 4 in (1.93 m)	186 lb (84 kg)	So	Jacksonville, Florida
G	14	Jason Morris	6 ft 5 in (1.96 m)	224 lb (102 kg)	Jr	Augusta, Georgia
G	23	Brandon Reed	6 ft 3 in (1.91 m)	182 lb (83 kg)	RS Jr	Powder Springs, Georgia
F	24	Kammeon Holsey	6 ft 8 in (2.03 m)	231 lb (105 kg)	RS Jr	Sparta, Georgia
G	30	Corey Heyward	6 ft 1 in (1.85 m)	214 lb (97 kg)	Fr	Duluth, Georgia
G/F	31	Aaron Peak	6 ft 4 in (1.93 m)	188 lb (85 kg)	So	Atlanta, Georgia
G	32	Brooks Doyle	6 ft 4 in (1.93 m)	185 lb (84 kg)	Fr	Atlanta, Georgia
G	45	Solomon Poole	6 ft 0 in (1.83 m)	180 lb (82 kg)	Fr	Jacksonville, Florida

Head coach

- Brian Gregory (Oakland)

Assistant coach(es)

- Chad Dollar (Milligan)
- Josh Postorino (Dayton)
- Billy Schmidt (Wake Forest)

Legend

- (C) Team captain
- (S) Suspended
- (I) Ineligible
- (W) Walk-on
- Injured
- Current redshirt

Roster
Last update: 2012-09-25

== Schedule ==
Date time, TV	Opponent	Result	Record	Site (attendance) city, state
Regular season
11/09/2012*; 8:00 pm, ESPN3	Tulane	W 79–61	1–0	McCamish Pavilion (8,600); Atlanta, GA
11/14/2012*; 7:00 pm, ESPN3	Presbyterian	W 52–38	2–0	McCamish Pavilion (5,733); Atlanta, GA
11/22/2012*; 9:00 pm, ESPNU	vs. Rice; DIRECTV Classic Quarterfinals	W 54–36	3–0	Anaheim Convention Center (1,087); Anaheim, CA
11/23/2012*; 11:59 pm, ESPN2	vs. California; DIRECTV Classic Semifinals	L 57–68	3–1	Anaheim Convention Center (1,627); Anaheim, CA
11/25/2012*; 6:30 pm, ESPNU	vs. Saint Mary's; DIRECTV Classic 3rd Place Game	W 65–56	4–1	Anaheim Convention Center (2,527); Anaheim, CA
11/28/2012*; 9:00 pm, ESPN2	at No. 22 Illinois; ACC-Big Ten Challenge	L 62–75	4–2	Assembly Hall (12,224); Champaign, IL
12/04/2012*; 7:00 pm, ESPNU	Georgia; Clean, Old-Fashioned Hate	W 62–54	5–2	McCamish Pavilion (8,600); Atlanta, GA
12/08/2012*; 7:00 pm, ESPN3	UNC Wilmington	W 73–66	6–2	McCamish Pavilion (5,982); Atlanta, GA
12/17/2012*; 7:00 pm, RSN	Alabama State	W 75–61	7–2	McCamish Pavilion (6,203); Atlanta, GA
12/22/2012*; 4:00 pm, RSN	The Citadel	W 73–41	8–2	McCamish Pavilion (7,769); Atlanta, GA
12/29/2012*; 7:00 pm, ESPN3	Fordham	W 73–48	9–2	McCamish Pavilion (7,851); Atlanta, GA
01/02/2013*; 7:00 pm, ESPN3	Chattanooga	W 74–58	10–2	McCamish Pavilion (5,829); Atlanta, GA
01/05/2013; 2:30 pm, ACCN/ESPN3	Miami (FL)	L 49–62	10–3 (0–1)	McCamish Pavilion (7,614); Atlanta, GA
01/09/2013; 8:00 pm, ACCN/ESPN3	at No. 20 NC State	L 70–83	10–4 (0–2)	PNC Arena (18,118); Raleigh, NC
01/12/2013; 2:30 pm, ACCN/ESPN3	Virginia Tech	L 65–70 ^{OT}	10–5 (0–3)	McCamish Pavilion (7,675); Atlanta, GA
01/17/2013; 9:00 pm, ESPN	at No. 3 Duke	L 57–73	10–6 (0–4)	Cameron Indoor Stadium (9,314); Durham, NC
01/23/2013; 9:00 pm, ESPN	at North Carolina	L 63–79	10–7 (0–5)	Dean Smith Center (19,124); Chapel Hill, NC
01/26/2013; 3:00 pm, ACCN/ESPN3	Wake Forest	W 82–62	11–7 (1–5)	McCamish Pavilion (8,180); Atlanta, GA
01/29/2013; 7:00 pm, RSN/ESPN3	at Clemson	L 60–63	11–8 (1–6)	Littlejohn Coliseum (7,059); Clemson, SC
02/03/2013; 3:00 pm, ESPNU	Virginia	W 66–60	12–8 (2–6)	McCamish Pavilion (7,128); Atlanta, GA
02/05/2013; 9:00 pm, RSN/ESPN3	Florida State	L 54–56	12–9 (2–7)	McCamish Pavilion (7,012); Atlanta, GA
02/09/2013; 1:00 pm, RSN/ESPN3	at Virginia Tech	W 64–54	13–9 (3–7)	Cassell Coliseum (6,006); Blacksburg, VA
02/14/2013; 7:00 pm, RSN/ESPN3	Clemson	L 53–56	13–10 (3–8)	McCamish Pavilion (6,862); Atlanta, GA
02/16/2013; 2:00 pm, RSN/ESPN3	at Wake Forest	W 57–56	14–10 (4–8)	LJVM Coliseum (10,486); Winston-Salem, NC
02/19/2013; 9:00 pm, ACCN/ESPN3	North Carolina	L 58–70	14–11 (4–9)	McCamish Pavilion (8,600); Atlanta, GA
02/24/2013; 2:00 pm, ACCN/ESPN3	at Virginia	L 54–82	14–12 (4–10)	John Paul Jones Arena (12,232); Charlottesville, VA
02/27/2013; 8:00 pm	Maryland	W 78–68	15–12 (5–10)	McCamish Pavilion (6,962); Atlanta, GA
03/03/2013; 6:00 pm, ESPNU	NC State	L 57–70	15–13 (5–11)	McCamish Pavilion (8,600); Atlanta, GA
03/06/2013; 9:00 pm, ACCN/ESPN3	at No. 6 Miami (FL)	W 71–69	16–13 (6–11)	BankUnited Center (7,394); Coral Gables, FL
03/09/2013; 12:00 pm, ACCN/ESPN3	at Boston College	L 72–74	16–14 (6–12)	Conte Forum (5,247); Chestnut Hill, FL
ACC men's basketball tournament
03/14/2013; 12:00 pm, ESPNU	vs. Boston College; First Round	L 64–84	16–15	Greensboro Coliseum (22,169); Greensboro, NC
*Non-conference game. ^{#}Rankings from AP Poll. (#) Tournament seedings in parentheses. All times are in Eastern Time.
