= 2012–13 NC State Wolfpack men's basketball team =

American college basketball season

2012–13 NC State Wolfpack men's basketball

NCAA Tournament, round of 64
- Conference: Atlantic Coast Conference
- Record: 24–11 (11–7 ACC)
- Head coach: Mark Gottfried
- Assistant coaches: Orlando Early; Bobby Lutz; Rob Moxley
- Home arena: PNC Arena

2012–13 ACC men's basketball standings
	Conf.				Overall
Team	W		L	PCT	W		L	PCT
No. 5 Miami (FL) †	15	–	3	.833	29	–	7	.806
No. 6 Duke	14	–	4	.778	30	–	6	.833
North Carolina	12	–	6	.667	25	–	11	.694
Virginia	11	–	7	.611	23	–	12	.657
NC State	11	–	7	.611	24	–	11	.686
Florida State	9	–	9	.500	18	–	16	.529
Maryland	8	–	10	.444	25	–	13	.658
Boston College	7	–	11	.389	16	–	17	.485
Georgia Tech	6	–	12	.333	16	–	15	.516
Wake Forest	6	–	12	.333	13	–	18	.419
Clemson	5	–	13	.278	13	–	18	.419
Virginia Tech	4	–	14	.222	13	–	19	.406
† 2013 ACC tournament winner As of April 2, 2013; Rankings from AP Poll

The 2012–13 NC State Wolfpack men's basketball team represented North Carolina State University in the 2012–13 NCAA Division I men's basketball season. The team's head coach was Mark Gottfried in his second season. The team played their home games at PNC Arena in Raleigh, North Carolina, as a member of the Atlantic Coast Conference. They finished the season 24–11, 11–7 in ACC play to finish in a tie for fourth place. They advanced to the semifinals of the ACC tournament where they lost to Miami (FL). They received an at-large bid to the 2013 NCAA tournament where they lost in the second round to Temple.

== Preseason ==
National pundits talked a lot about the Wolfpack in their early preseason discussions of the top teams in the country. NC State returned its top four leading scorers from the 2011-12 season in C. J. Leslie (14.7 ppg), Lorenzo Brown (12.7 ppg), Scott Wood (12.4 ppg) and Richard Howell (10.8 ppg). In addition, NC State landed Rodney Purvis, Tyler Lewis, and T. J. Warren to wrap up a Top 10 recruiting class. ESPN’s Andy Katz had the Wolfpack as the top rated ACC squad, at No. 6, in his early predictions. His counterpart, Sports Illustrated’s Luke Winn, had the Wolfpack listed as the No. 5 team in the nation according to his power rankings. NC State was ranked 20th in the final ESPN/USA Today Coaches Poll following its Sweet Sixteen run in the NCAA Tournament.

=== Class of 2012 Signees ===
College recruiting information
Name	Hometown	School	Height	Weight	Commit date
Tyler Lewis; G	Statesville, North Carolina	Oak Hill Academy (VA)	5 ft 11 in (1.80 m)	165 lb (75 kg)	Oct 28, 2010
Tyler Lewis; G	Recruit ratings: Scout: Rivals: (94)				
Rodney Purvis; G	Raleigh, North Carolina	Upper Room Christian Academy	6 ft 3 in (1.91 m)	190 lb (86 kg)	Sep 30, 2011
Rodney Purvis; G	Recruit ratings: Scout: Rivals: (96)				
T. J. Warren; F	Durham, North Carolina	Brewster Academy (NH)	6 ft 8 in (2.03 m)	230 lb (100 kg)	Nov 2, 2011
T. J. Warren; F	Recruit ratings: Scout: Rivals: (96)				
Overall recruit ranking: Scout: 5 Rivals: 7 ESPN: 10
Note: In many cases, Scout, Rivals, 247Sports, On3, and ESPN may conflict in their listings of height and weight.; In these cases, the average was taken. ESPN grades are on a 100-point scale.; Sources: "North Carolina State 2012 Basketball Commitments". Rivals.; "2012 North Carolina State Commits". Scout.; "ESPN". ESPN.; "Scout.com Team Recruiting Rankings". Scout.; "2012 Team Ranking". Rivals.

== Roster ==
2012–13 NC State Wolfpack men's basketball team
Players
Coaches

Pos.	#	Name	Height	Weight	Year	Hometown
G	0	Rodney Purvis	6 ft 3 in (1.91 m)	195 lb (88 kg)	Fr	Raleigh, North Carolina
F	1	Richard Howell	6 ft 8 in (2.03 m)	257 lb (117 kg)	Sr	Marietta, Georgia
G	2	Lorenzo Brown	6 ft 5 in (1.96 m)	186 lb (84 kg)	Jr	Roswell, Georgia
F	5	C. J. Leslie	6 ft 9 in (2.06 m)	200 lb (91 kg)	Jr	Holly Springs, North Carolina
G	10	Chase Cannon	6 ft 4 in (1.93 m)	189 lb (86 kg)	Fr	Morehead City, North Carolina
G	12	Tyler Lewis	5 ft 11 in (1.8 m)	157 lb (71 kg)	Fr	Statesville, North Carolina
F	13	Thomas de Thaey*	6 ft 8 in (2.03 m)	244 lb (111 kg)	So	Dendermonde, Belgium
C	14	Jordan Vandenberg	7 ft 1 in (2.16 m)	264 lb (120 kg)	RS Jr	Melbourne, Australia
F	15	Scott Wood	6 ft 6 in (1.98 m)	169 lb (77 kg)	Sr	Marion, Indiana
G	20	Jay Lewis	6 ft 1 in (1.85 m)	198 lb (90 kg)	Sr	Greensboro, North Carolina
G	22	Ralston Turner	6 ft 5 in (1.96 m)	209 lb (95 kg)	Jr	Muscle Shoals, Alabama
F	24	T. J. Warren	6 ft 8 in (2.03 m)	233 lb (106 kg)	Fr	Durham, North Carolina
G	30	Staats Battle	6 ft 6 in (1.98 m)	191 lb (87 kg)	So	Raleigh, North Carolina
F	34	Jevoni Robinson	6 ft 8 in (2.03 m)	216 lb (98 kg)	So	Charlotte, North Carolina

Head coach

- Mark Gottfried (Alabama)

Assistant coach(es)

- Orlando Early (Gardner–Webb)
- Bobby Lutz (Charlotte)
- Rob Moxley (Pfeiffer)

Legend

- (C) Team captain
- (S) Suspended
- (I) Ineligible
- (W) Walk-on
- Injured
- Current redshirt

Roster
Last update: 10/10/2012

* Left team November 26, 2012

== Schedule and results ==
NC State's January 12 win over (AP) #1 Duke was the program's sixth win over an AP #1 program and their second over Duke as the AP #1 team. NC State's last win over an AP #1 team was Feb. 15, 2004, also over Duke. ESPN's College GameDay covered the January 26th game against UNC, marking the first and only time that the Wolfpack have appeared on the basketball version of the program.

Date time, TV	Rank^{#}	Opponent^{#}	Result	Record	High points	High rebounds	High assists	Site (attendance) city, state
Exhibition
November 3, 2012*; 7:00 pm	No. 6	Belmont Abbey	W 105–80	–	21 – Brown	9 – 3 tied	5 – Howell	PNC Arena (11,335); Raleigh, NC
Non-conference regular season
November 9, 2012*; 7:00 pm, ESPN3	No. 6	Miami (OH)	W 97–59	1–0	11 – Leslie	10 – Howell	7 – Brown	PNC Arena (19,065); Raleigh, NC
November 15, 2012*; 5:00 pm, ESPN2	No. 6	vs. Penn State; Puerto Rico Tip-Off Quarterfinals	W 72–55	2–0	22 – Warren	8 – Warren	4 – Brown	Coliseo Rubén Rodríguez (N/A); Bayamón, PR
November 16, 2012*; 5:00 pm, ESPN2	No. 6	vs. Massachusetts; Puerto Rico Tip-Off semifinals	W 94–76	3–0	21 – Warren	9 – Howell	10 – Brown	Coliseo Rubén Rodríguez (N/A); Bayamón, PR
November 18, 2012*; 6:30 pm, ESPN2	No. 6	vs. Oklahoma State; Puerto Rico Tip-Off Finals	L 56–76	3–1	16 – Purvis	5 – Brown	2 – Tied	Coliseo Rubén Rodríguez (6,872); Bayamón, PR
November 23, 2012*; 7:00 pm, ESPN3	No. 16	UNC Asheville	W 82–80	4–1	23 – Howell	15 – Howell	4 – Brown	PNC Arena (17,228); Raleigh, NC
November 27, 2012*; 7:30 pm, ESPN	No. 18	at No. 3 Michigan; ACC–Big Ten Challenge	L 72–79	4–2	18 – Warren	10 – Leslie	10 – Brown	Crisler Center (12,693); Ann Arbor, MI
December 4, 2012*; 9:00 pm, ESPN	No. 25	vs. Connecticut; Jimmy V Classic	W 69–65	5–2	16 – Tied	13 – Leslie	5 – Brown	Madison Square Garden (11,840); New York City, NY
December 8, 2012*; 1:00 pm, FSSO/ESPN3	No. 25	Cleveland State	W 80–63	6–2	19 – Leslie	10 – Howell	6 – Brown	Reynolds Coliseum (7,234); Raleigh, NC
December 15, 2012*; 7:00 pm, ESPN3	No. 25	Norfolk State	W 84–62	7–2	21 – Warren	19 – Howell	7 – Brown	PNC Arena (12,384); Raleigh, NC
December 18, 2012*; 9:00 pm, ESPN2	No. 25	Stanford	W 88–79	8–2	24 – Brown	12 – Howell	5 – Brown	PNC Arena (15,772); Raleigh, NC
December 22, 2012*; 3:00 pm, ESPN3	No. 25	St. Bonaventure	W 92–73	9–2	33 – Leslie	8 – Leslie	11 – Brown	PNC Arena (16,288); Raleigh, NC
December 29, 2012*; 12:00 pm, ESPNU	No. 23	Western Michigan	W 84–68	10–2	19 – Leslie	9 – Howell	4 – Purvis	PNC Arena (12,576); Raleigh, NC
December 31, 2012*; 5:00 pm, ESPNU	No. 23	UNC Greensboro	W 89–68	11–2	21 – Leslie	13 – Howell	9 – Brown	PNC Arena (12,207); Raleigh, NC
ACC Regular Season
January 5, 2013; 4:15 pm, ESPN2	No. 23	at Boston College	W 78–73	12–2 (1–0)	19 – Purvis	11 – Howell	8 – Brown	Conte Forum (6,248); Chestnut Hill, MA
January 9, 2013; 8:00 pm, ACCN/ESPN3	No. 20	Georgia Tech	W 83–70	13–2 (2–0)	21 – Brown	12 – Howell	10 – Brown	PNC Arena (18,118); Raleigh, NC
January 12, 2013; 12:00 pm, ESPN	No. 20	No. 1 Duke	W 84–76	14–2 (3–0)	25 – Leslie	18 – Howell	13 – Brown	PNC Arena (19,557); Raleigh, NC
January 16, 2013; 7:00 pm, ESPN2	No. 14	at Maryland	L 50–51	14–3 (3–1)	17 – Brown	13 – Howell	4 – Brown	Comcast Center (17,950); College Park, MD
January 20, 2013; 6:00 pm, ESPNU	No. 14	Clemson	W 66–62	15–3 (4–1)	21 – Warren	12 – Howell	5 – Brown	PNC Arena (19,557); Raleigh, NC
January 22, 2013; 7:00 pm, RSN/ESPN3	No. 18	at Wake Forest	L 84–86	15–4 (4–2)	18 – Purvis	16 – Howell	10 – Brown	LJVM Coliseum (11,542); Winston-Salem, NC
January 26, 2013; 7:00 pm, ESPN	No. 18	North Carolina; Carolina–State Game and ESPN College GameDay	W 91–83	16–4 (5–2)	20 – Brown	14 – Howell	11 – Brown	PNC Arena (19,577); Raleigh, NC
January 29, 2013; 7:00 pm, ESPN2	No. 19	at Virginia	L 55–58	16–5 (5–3)	20 – Leslie	14 – Leslie	6 – Howell	John Paul Jones Arena (10,977); Charlottesville, VA
February 2, 2013; 4:00 pm, CBS	No. 19	No. 14 Miami (FL)	L 78–79	16–6 (5–4)	18 – Leslie	12 – Leslie	5 – Lewis	PNC Arena (19,557); Raleigh, NC
February 7, 2013; 9:00 pm, ACCN/ESPN3		at No. 4 Duke	L 85–98	16–7 (5–5)	23 – Howell	9 – Howell	6 – Lewis	Cameron Indoor Stadium (9,314); Durham, NC
February 10, 2013; 1:00 pm, ACCN/ESPN3		at Clemson	W 58–57	17–7 (6–5)	16 – Howell	11 – Howell	4 – Brown	Littlejohn Coliseum (9,455); Clemson, SC
February 16, 2013; 2:00 pm, ESPN2		Virginia Tech	W 90–86 ^{OT}	18–7 (7–5)	22 – Wood	16 – Howell	7 – Brown	PNC Arena (18,257); Raleigh, NC
February 19, 2013; 7:00 pm, ESPN2		Florida State	W 84–66	19–7 (8–5)	31 – Warren	13 – Warren	9 – Brown	PNC Arena (17,011); Raleigh, NC
February 23, 2013; 4:00 pm, ESPN		at North Carolina; Carolina–State Game	L 65–76	19–8 (8–6)	19 – Wood	17 – Howell	12 – Brown	Dean E. Smith Center (21,750); Chapel Hill, NC
February 27, 2013; 8:00 pm, ACCN/ESPN3		Boston College	W 82–64	20–8 (9–6)	21 – Purvis	10 – Howell	6 – Brown	PNC Arena (15,807); Raleigh, NC
March 3, 2013; 6:00 pm, ESPNU		at Georgia Tech	W 70–57	21–8 (10–6)	18 – Howell	8 – Wood	7 – Brown	McCamish Pavilion (8,600); Atlanta, GA
March 6, 2013; 9:00 pm, ACCN/ESPN3		Wake Forest	W 81–66	22–8 (11–6)	19 – Leslie	10 – Leslie	7 – Brown	PNC Arena (16,892); Raleigh, NC
March 9, 2013; 2:00 pm, ESPN2		at Florida State	L 67–71	22–9 (11–7)	18 – Wood	9 – Tied	8 – Brown	Donald L. Tucker Center (6,730); Tallahassee, FL
2013 ACC Tournament
March 14, 2013; 2:30 pm, ESPNU		vs. Virginia Tech; First round	W 80–63	23–9	22 – Howell	12 – Howell	12 – Brown	Greensboro Coliseum (22,169); Greensboro, NC
March 15, 2013; 2:41 pm, ESPN2		vs. Virginia; Quarterfinals	W 75–56	24–9	23 – Wood	12 – Howell	6 – Brown	Greensboro Coliseum (22,169); Greensboro, NC
March 16, 2013; 1:00 pm, ESPN		vs. No. 9 Miami; Semifinals	L 71–81	24–10	21 – Wood	11 – Howell	8 – Brown	Greensboro Coliseum (22,169); Greensboro, NC
2013 NCAA Tournament
March 22, 2013*; 1:40 pm, TBS	(8 E)	vs. (9 E) Temple; Second round	L 72–76	24–11	22 – Brown	15 – Howell	9 – Brown	UD Arena (12,353); Dayton, OH
*Non-conference game. ^{#}Rankings from AP Poll. (#) Tournament seedings in parentheses. All times are in Eastern Time. (#) during NCAA Tournament is Seed with Region E=East.

== Rankings ==
Ranking movement Legend: ██ Increase in ranking. ██ Decrease in ranking.
Poll	Pre	Wk 1	Wk 2	Wk 3	Wk 4	Wk 5	Wk 6	Wk 7	Wk 8	Wk 9	Wk 10	Wk 11	Wk 12	Wk 13	Wk 14	Wk 15	Wk 16	Wk 17	Wk 18	Final
AP	6	6	16	18	25	25	25	23	23	20	14	18	19							
Coaches	6	6	15	18	24	25	RV	25	25	21	15	18	19							
