= 2012–13 Atlantic Coast Conference men's basketball season =

- League: NCAA Division I
- Sport: Basketball
- Teams: 12
- TV partner(s): ACCN, ESPN, Raycom Sports, Learfield Sports, CBS

Regular Season
- First place: Miami
- Season MVP: Erick Green, Virginia Tech

ACC tournament

Atlantic Coast Conference men's basketball seasons
- ← 2011–12 2013–14 →

The 2012–13 ACC men's basketball season followed by the start of the 2012–13 NCAA Division I men's basketball season. in November Conference play started in early January 2013 and concluded in March with the 2013 ACC men's basketball tournament at the Greensboro Coliseum in Greensboro.

2012–13 ACC men's basketball standings
	Conf.				Overall
Team	W		L	PCT	W		L	PCT
No. 5 Miami (FL) †	15	–	3	.833	29	–	7	.806
No. 6 Duke	14	–	4	.778	30	–	6	.833
North Carolina	12	–	6	.667	25	–	11	.694
Virginia	11	–	7	.611	23	–	12	.657
NC State	11	–	7	.611	24	–	11	.686
Florida State	9	–	9	.500	18	–	16	.529
Maryland	8	–	10	.444	25	–	13	.658
Boston College	7	–	11	.389	16	–	17	.485
Georgia Tech	6	–	12	.333	16	–	15	.516
Wake Forest	6	–	12	.333	13	–	18	.419
Clemson	5	–	13	.278	13	–	18	.419
Virginia Tech	4	–	14	.222	13	–	19	.406
† 2013 ACC tournament winner As of April 2, 2013; Rankings from AP Poll

== Preseason ==
	Coaches
1.	N.C. State (8)
2.	Duke (3)
3.	North Carolina (1)
4.	Miami
5.	Florida State
6.	Maryland
7.	Virginia
8.	Clemson
9.	Georgia Tech
10.	Virginia Tech
11.	Wake Forest
12.	Boston College

() first place votes

=== Preseason All-ACC teams ===
Coaches
Lorenzo Brown NC State
**C. J. Leslie NC State**
James Michael McAdoo North Carolina
Mason Plumlee Duke
Michael Snaer Florida State

- Coaches select 8 players
- Players in bold are choices for ACC Player of the Year

== Rankings ==
Legend
Increase in ranking
Decrease in ranking
Not ranked previous week

		Pre	Wk 1	Wk 2	Wk 3	Wk 4	Wk 5	Wk 6	Wk 7	Wk 8	Wk 9	Wk 10	Wk 11	Wk 12	Wk 13	Wk 14	Wk 15	Wk 16	Wk 17	Wk 18	Wk 19	Final
Boston College	AP																					
Boston College	C																					
Clemson	AP																					
Clemson	C																					
Duke	AP	8	9	5	2	2	2	1	1	1	1	3	1	5	4	2	6	3	3	2	6	
Duke	C	8	9	5	2	2	2	1	1	1	1	3	1	5	4	1	6	3	4	2	7	
Florida State	AP	25	RV																		RV	
Florida State	C	24	RV																			
Georgia Tech	AP																					
Georgia Tech	C																					
Maryland	AP										RV						RV					
Maryland	C										RV											
Miami	AP											RV	25	14	8	3	2	4	6	9	5	
Miami	C											RV	RV	15	11	4	2	7	7	10	6	
North Carolina	AP	11	11	9	14	20	21	23	RV	RV	RV		RV					RV	RV	RV	RV	
North Carolina	C	12	11	9	13	16	18	20	RV	RV	RV							RV	RV	RV	RV	
NC State	AP	6	6	16	18	25	25	25	23	23	20	14	18	19	RV	RV	RV					
NC State	C	6	6	15	18	24	25	RV	25	23	21	15	18	19	RV							
Virginia	AP														RV	RV						
Virginia	C										RV					RV			RV			
Virginia Tech	AP																					
Virginia Tech	C																					
Wake Forest	AP																					
Wake Forest	C																					

== Conference schedules ==
=== Composite matrix ===
This table summarizes the head-to-head results between teams in conference play. (x) indicates games remaining this season.

	Boston College	Clemson	Duke	Florida State	Georgia Tech	Maryland	Miami	North Carolina	NC State	Virginia	Virginia Tech	Wake Forest
vs. Boston College	–	0–2	2–0	1–0	0–1	1–1	2–0	1–0	2–0	1–1	0–1	1–1
vs. Clemson	2–0	–	1–0	2–0	0–2	1–0	2–0	1–0	2–0	1–1	1–1	0–1
vs. Duke	0–2	0–1	–	0–1	0–1	1–1	1–1	0–2	1–1	1–0	0–2	0–2
vs. Florida State	0–1	0–2	1–0	–	0–1	0–2	2–0	2–0	1–1	1–1	1–0	1–1
vs. Georgia Tech	1–0	2–0	1–0	1–0	–	0–1	1–1	2–0	2–0	1–1	1–1	0–2
vs. Maryland	1–1	0–1	1–1	2–0	1–0	–	1–0	2–0	0–1	2–0	0–2	0–2
vs. Miami	0–2	0–2	1–1	0–2	1–1	0–1	–	0–2	0–1	0–1	0–2	1–0
vs. North Carolina	0–1	0–1	2–0	0–2	0–2	0–2	2–0	–	1–1	1–1	0–1	0–1
vs. NC State	0–2	0–2	1–1	1–1	0–2	1–0	1–0	1–1	–	1–0	0–1	1–1
vs. Virginia	1–1	1–1	0–1	0–1	1–1	0–2	1–0	1–1	0–1	–	0–2	1–0
vs. Virginia Tech	1–0	1–1	2–0	1–1	1–1	2–0	2–0	1–0	1–0	2–0	–	0–2
vs. Wake Forest	1–1	1–0	2–0	1–1	2–0	2–0	0–1	1–0	1–1	0–1	2–0	–
Total	7–11	5–13	14–4	9–9	6–12	8–10	15–3	12–6	11–7	11–7	4–14	6–12

=== Boston College ===
Date time, TV	Rank^{#}	Opponent^{#}	Result	Record	Site city, state
ACC Regular Season
January 5, 2013; 4:15 pm, ESPN2		No. 23 NC State	**L** 73–78	8–6 (0-1)	Conte Forum; Chestnut Hill, MA
January 9, 2013; 7:00 pm, RSN		at Virginia Tech	**W** 86–75	9–6 (1-1)	Cassell Coliseum; Blacksburg, VA
January 12, 2013; 4:00 pm, RSN		at Wake Forest	**L** 72–75	9–7 (1-2)	LJVM Coliseum; Winston-Salem, NC
January 16, 2013; 7:00 pm, RSN		Miami (FL)	**L** 59–60	9–8 (1-3)	Conte Forum; Chestnut Hill, MA
January 22, 2013; 7:00 pm, ESPNU		at Maryland	**L** 59-64	9–9 (1-4)	Comcast Center; College Park, MD
January 26, 2013; 1:00 pm, RSN		at Virginia	**L** 51-65	9–10 (1-5)	John Paul Jones Arena; Charlottesville, VA
January 29, 2013; 9:00 pm, ESPNU		North Carolina	**L** 70-82	9–11 (1-6)	Conte Forum; Chestnut Hill, MA
February 2, 2013; 12:00 pm, ACCN		Clemson	**W** 75-68	10–11 (2-6)	Conte Forum; Chestnut Hill, MA
February 5, 2013; 7:00 pm		at No. 8 Miami (FL)	**L** 50-72	10–12 (2-7)	BankUnited Center; Coral Gables, FL
February 10, 2013; 6:00 pm, ESPNU		No. 4 Duke	**L** 61-62	10–13 (2-8)	Conte Forum; Chestnut Hill, MA
February 13, 2013; 7:00 pm, RSN		Wake Forest	**W** 66-63	11-13 (3-8)	Conte Forum; Chestnut Hill, MA
February 16, 2013; 12:00 pm, ACCN		at Florida State	**L** 66-69	11-14 (3-9)	Donald L. Tucker Center; Tallahassee, FL
February 19, 2013; 7:00 pm, ACCN		Maryland	**W** 69-58	12–14 (4-9)	Conte Forum; Chestnut Hill, MA
February 24, 2013; 2:00 pm, ACCN		at No. 6 Duke	**L** 68-89	12–15 (4-10)	Cameron Indoor Stadium; Durham, NC
February 27, 2013; 8:00 pm, ACCN		at NC State	**L** 64-82	12-16 (4–11)	PNC Arena; Raleigh, NC
March 3, 2013; 4:00 pm, ACCN		Virginia	**W** 53-52	13–16 (5-11)	Conte Forum; Chestnut Hill, MA
March 5, 2013; 7:00 pm, RSN		at Clemson	**W** 68-61	14–16 (6-11)	Littlejohn Coliseum; Clemson, SC
March 9, 2013; 12:00 pm, ACCN		Georgia Tech	**W** 74-72	15–16 (7-11)	Conte Forum; Chestnut Hill, MA
2013 ACC tournament
March 14, 2013; 12:00 pm, ACCN/ESPN		vs. Georgia Tech; 2013 ACC tournament first round	**W** 84-64	16-16	Greensboro Coliseum; Greensboro, NC
March 15, 2013; 12:00 pm, ACCN/ESPN		vs. No. 9 Miami; 2013 ACC tournament Quarterfinal	**L** 58-69	16-17	Greensboro Coliseum; Greensboro, NC
*Non-conference game. ^{#}Rankings from AP Poll. (#) Tournament seedings in parentheses. All times are in Eastern Time.

=== Clemson ===
Date time, TV	Rank^{#}	Opponent^{#}	Result	Record	Site city, state
ACC Regular Season
January 5, 2013; 4:00 pm, RSN		Florida State	**L** 66-71	8–5 (0-1)	Littlejohn Coliseum; Clemson, SC
January 8, 2013; 7:00 pm, ESPNU		at No. 1 Duke	**L** 40-68	8-6 (0-2)	Cameron Indoor Stadium; Durham, NC
January 12, 2013; 12:00 pm, ACCN		Virginia	**W** 59-44	9–6 (1-2)	Littlejohn Coliseum; Clemson, SC
January 15, 2013; 7:00 pm, ESPNU		Wake Forest	**W** 60-44	10-6 (2–2)	Littlejohn Coliseum; Clemson, SC
January 20, 2013; 6:00 pm, ESPNU		at No. 14 NC State	**L** 62-66	10-7 (2–3)	PNC Arena; Raleigh, NC
January 24, 2013; 8:00 pm, ACCN		at Florida State	**L** 57-60	10-8 (2–4)	Donald L. Tucker Center; Tallahassee, FL
January 27, 2013; 1:00 pm, ACCN		Virginia Tech	**W** 77-70	11-8 (3–4)	Littlejohn Coliseum; Clemson, SC
January 29, 2013; 7:00 pm, RSN		Georgia Tech	**W** 63-60	12-8 (4–4)	Littlejohn Coliseum; Clemson, SC
February 2, 2013; 12:00 pm, ACCN		at Boston College	**L** 68-75	12-9 (4–5)	Conte Forum; Chestnut Hill, MA
February 7, 2013; 7:00 pm, ESPN/ESPN2		at Virginia	**L** 41-78	12-10 (4-6)	John Paul Jones Arena; Charlottesville, VA
February 10, 2013; 1:00 pm, ACCN		NC State	**L** 57-58	12-11 (4-7)	Littlejohn Coliseum; Clemson, SC
February 14, 2013; 7:00 pm, RSN		at Georgia Tech	**W** 56-53	13-11 (5-7)	McCamish Pavilion; Atlanta, GA
February 17, 2013; 6:00 pm, ESPNU		No. 3 Miami (FL)	**L** 43-45	13–12 (5-8)	Littlejohn Coliseum; Clemson, SC
February 23, 2013; 12:00 pm, ESPN2		at Maryland	**L** 59-72	13–13 (5-9)	Comcast Center; College Park, MD
February 28, 2013; 7:00 pm, ESPN/ESPN2		North Carolina	**L** 59-68	13–14 (5-10)	Littlejohn Coliseum; Clemson, SC
March 2, 2013; 8:00 pm, RSN		at Virginia Tech	**L** 61-69	13–15 (5-11)	Cassell Coliseum; Blacksburg, VA
March 6, 2013; 7:00 pm, RSN		Boston College	**L** 61-68	13–16 (5-12)	Littlejohn Coliseum; Clemson, SC
March 9, 2013; 2:30 pm, ACCN		at No. 6 Miami (FL)	**W** 62-49	13–17 (5-13)	BankUnited Center; Coral Gables, FL
2013 ACC tournament
March 14, 2013; 9:30 pm, ACCN/ESPN		vs. Florida State; 2013 ACC tournament first round	**L** 69-73	13–18	Greensboro Coliseum; Greensboro, NC
*Non-conference game. ^{#}Rankings from AP Poll. (#) Tournament seedings in parentheses. All times are in Eastern Time.

=== Duke ===
Date time, TV	Rank^{#}	Opponent^{#}	Result	Record	Site city, state
ACC Regular Season
January 5, 2013; 12:00 pm, ESPNU	No. 1	Wake Forest	**W** 80-62	14–0 (1-0)	Cameron Indoor Stadium; Durham, NC
January 8, 2013; 7:00 pm, ESPNU	No. 1	Clemson	**W** 68-40	15–0 (2-0)	Cameron Indoor Stadium; Durham, NC
January 12, 2013; 12:00 pm, ESPN	No. 1	at No. 20 NC State	**L** 76-84	15–1 (2-1)	PNC Arena; Raleigh, NC
January 17, 2013; 9:00 pm, ESPN	No. 3	Georgia Tech	**W** 73-57	16–1 (3-1)	Cameron Indoor Stadium; Durham, NC
January 23, 2013; 7:00 pm, ESPN	No. 1	at No. 25 Miami (FL)	**L** 63-90	16–2 (3-2)	BankUnited Center; Coral Gables, FL
January 26, 2013; 1:00 pm, CBS	No. 1	Maryland	**W** 84-64	17–2 (4-2)	Cameron Indoor Stadium; Durham, NC
January 30, 2013; 8:00 pm, ACCN	No. 5	at Wake Forest	**W** 75-70	18–2 (5-2)	LJVM Coliseum; Winston-Salem, NC
February 2, 2013; 2:00 pm, ESPN	No. 5	at Florida State	**W** 79-60	19–2 (6-2)	Donald L. Tucker Center; Tallahassee, FL
February 7, 2013; 9:00 pm, ACCN	No. 4	NC State	**W** 98-85	20–2 (7-2)	Cameron Indoor Stadium; Durham, NC
February 10, 2013; 6:00 pm, ESPNU	No. 4	at Boston College	**W** 62-61	21–2 (8-2)	Conte Forum; Chestnut Hill, MA
February 13, 2013; 9:00 pm, ESPN	No. 2	North Carolina '**Carolina–Duke rivalry'**	**W** 73-68	22-2 (9-2)	Cameron Indoor Stadium; Durham, NC
February 16, 2013; 6:00 pm, ESPN	No. 2	at Maryland	**L** 81-83	22-3 (9-3)	Comcast Center; College Park, MD
February 21, 2013; 9:00 pm, ESPN2	No. 6	at Virginia Tech	**W** 88-56	23–3 (10-3)	Cassell Coliseum; Blacksburg, VA
February 23, 2013; 2:00 pm, ACCN	No. 6	Boston College	**W** 89-68	24–3 (11-3)	Cameron Indoor Stadium; Durham, NC
February 28, 2013; 9:00 pm, ESPN	No. 3	at Virginia	**L** 68-73	24–4 (11-4)	John Paul Jones Arena; Charlottesville, VA
March 2, 2013; 6:00 pm, ESPN	No. 3	No. 5 Miami	**W** 79-76	25–4 (12-4)	Cameron Indoor Stadium; Durham, NC
March 5, 2013; 7:00 pm, ESPNU	No. 3	Virginia Tech	**W** 85-57	26–4 (13-4)	Cameron Indoor Stadium; Durham, NC
March 9, 2013; 9:00 pm, ESPN	No. 3	at North Carolina '**College GameDay'**	**W** 69-53	27–4 (14–4)	Dean E. Smith Center; Chapel Hill, NC
2013 ACC tournament
March 15, 2013; 7:00 pm, ACCN/ESPN	No. 2	vs. Maryland; 2013 ACC tournament Quarterfinal	**L** 74-83	27–5	Greensboro Coliseum; Greensboro, NC
2013 NCAA tournament
March 22, 2013*; 12:15 pm, CBS	No. (2)	vs. No. (15) Albany; 2013 NCAA tournament second round	**W** 73-61	28-5	Wells Fargo Center; Philadelphia, PA
March 24, 2013*; 9:40 pm, TBS	No. (2)	vs. No. (7) Creighton; 2013 NCAA tournament Third Round	**W** 66-50	29-5	Wells Fargo Center; Philadelphia, PA
March 29, 2013*; 9:45 pm, CBS	No. (2)	vs. No. (3) Michigan State; 2013 NCAA tournament Sweet 16			Lucas Oil Stadium; Indianapolis, IN
*Non-conference game. ^{#}Rankings from AP Poll. (#) Tournament seedings in parentheses. All times are in Eastern Time (#) during NCAA tournament is seed with Region.

=== Florida State ===
Date time, TV	Rank^{#}	Opponent^{#}	Result	Record	Site city, state
ACC Regular Season
January 5, 2013; 4:00 pm, FSN		at Clemson	**W** 71-66	9-5 (1–0)	Littlejohn Coliseum; Clemson, SC
January 9, 2013; 8:00 pm, ACCN		at Maryland	**W** 65-62	10-5 (2–0)	Comcast Center; College Park, MD
January 12, 2013; 2:00 pm, ESPN		North Carolina	**L** 72-77	10-6 (2-1)	Donald L. Tucker Center; Tallahassee, FL
January 19, 2013; 4:00 pm, ACCN		at Virginia	**L** 36-56	10-7 (2-2)	John Paul Jones Arena; Charlottesville, VA
January 24, 2013; 8:00 pm, ACCN		Clemson	**W** 60-57	11-7 (3-2)	Donald L. Tucker Center; Tallahassee, FL
January 27, 2013; 6:00 pm, ESPNU		at No. 25 Miami (FL)	**L** 47-71	11-8 (3-3)	BankAtlantic Center; Coral Gables, FL
January 30, 2013; 8:00 pm, ACCN		Maryland	**W** 73-71	12-8 (4-3)	Donald L. Tucker Center; Tallahassee, FL
February 2, 2013; 2:00 pm, ESPN		Duke	**L** 60-79	12-9 (4-4)	Donald L. Tucker Center; Tallahassee, FL
February 5, 2013; 9:00 pm, FSN		at Georgia Tech	**W** 56-54	13–9 (5-4)	McCamish Pavilion; Atlanta, GA
February 9, 2013; 12:00 pm, ESPN/ESPN2		at Wake Forest	**L** 46-71	13-10 (5-5)	LJVM Coliseum; Winston-Salem, NC
February 13, 2013; 7:00 pm, ESPN/ESPN2		No. 3 Miami (FL)	**L** 68-74	13-11 (5-6)	Donald L. Tucker Center; Tallahassee, FL
February 16, 2013; 12:00 pm, ACCN		Boston College	**W** 69-66	14-11 (6-6)	Donald L. Tucker Center; Tallahassee, FL
February 19, 2013; 7:00 pm, ESPN2		at NC State	**L** 66-84	14-12 (6-7)	PNC Arena; Raleigh, NC
February 24, 2013; 6:00 pm, ESPNU		at Virginia Tech	**L** 70-80	14-13 (6-8)	Cassell Coliseum; Blacksburg, VA
February 26, 2013; 9:00 pm, ESPNU		Wake Forest	**W** 76-62	15-13 (7-8)	Donald L. Tucker Center; Tallahassee, FL
March 3, 2013; 2:00 pm, CBS		at North Carolina	**L** 58-79	15-14 (7-9)	Dean Smith Center; Chapel Hill, NC
March 7, 2013; 7:00 pm, ESPN/ESPN2		Virginia	**W** 53-51	16-14 (8-9)	Donald L. Tucker Center; Tallahassee, FL
March 9, 2013; 2:00 pm, ESPN/ESPN2		NC State	**W** 71-67	17-14 (9-9)	Donald L. Tucker Center; Tallahassee, FL
2013 ACC tournament
March 14, 2013; 9:30 pm, ESPN/ESPN2		vs. Clemson; 2013 ACC tournament first round	**W** 73-69	18-14	Greensboro Coliseum; Greensboro, NC
March 15, 2013; 9:30 pm, ESPN/ESPN2		vs. North Carolina; 2013 ACC tournament Quarterfinal	**L** 62-83	18-15	Greensboro Coliseum; Greensboro, NC
2013 NIT
March 19, 2013*; 7:15 pm, ESPN3	No. (4)	No. (5) Louisiana Tech; 2013 NIT First Round	**L** 66-71	18-16	Donald L. Tucker Center; Tallahassee, FL
*Non-Conference Game. Rankings from AP poll. All times are in Eastern Time. (#) Number seeded with region.

=== Georgia Tech ===
Date time, TV	Rank^{#}	Opponent^{#}	Result	Record	Site city, state
ACC Regular Season
January 5, 2013; 2:30 pm, ACCN		Miami (FL)	**L** 49–62	10–3 (0-1)	McCamish Pavilion; Atlanta, GA
January 9, 2013; 8:00 pm, ACCN		at No. 20 NC State	**L** 70–83	10–4 (0-2)	PNC Arena; Raleigh, NC
January 12, 2013; 2:30 pm, ACCN		Virginia Tech	**L** 65-70 ^{OT}	10-5 (0-3)	McCamish Pavilion; Atlanta, GA
January 17, 2013; 9:00 pm, ESPN		at Duke	**L** 57-73	10-6 (0-4)	Cameron Indoor Stadium; Durham, NC
January 23, 2013; 9:00 pm, ESPN		at North Carolina	**L** 63-79	10–7 (0-5)	Dean Smith Center; Chapel Hill, NC
January 26, 2013; 3:00 pm, ACCN		Wake Forest	**W** 82-62	11-7 (1-5)	McCamish Pavilion; Atlanta, GA
January 29, 2013; 7:00 pm, RSN		at Clemson	**L** 60-63	11–8 (1-6)	Littlejohn Coliseum; Clemson, SC
February 3, 2013; 3:00 pm, ESPNU		Virginia	**W** 66-60	12-8 (2-6)	McCamish Pavilion; Atlanta, GA
February 5, 2013; 9:00 pm, RSN		Florida State	**L** 54-56	12–9 (2-7)	McCamish Pavilion; Atlanta, GA
February 9, 2013; 1:00 pm, RSN		at Virginia Tech	**W** 64-54	13–9 (3-7)	Cassell Coliseum; Blacksburg, VA
February 14, 2013; 7:00 pm, RSN		Clemson	**L** 53-56	13–10 (3-8)	McCamish Pavilion; Atlanta, GA
February 16, 2013; 2:00 pm, RSN		at Wake Forest	**W** 57-56	14–10 (4-8)	LJVM Coliseum; Winston-Salem, NC
February 19, 2013; 9:00 pm, ACCN		North Carolina	**L** 58-70	14–11 (4-9)	McCamish Pavilion; Atlanta, GA
February 24, 2013; 2:00 pm, ACCN		at Virginia	**L** 54-82	14–12 (4-10)	John Paul Jones Arena; Charlottesville, VA
February 27, 2013; 8:00 pm, ACCN		Maryland	**W** 78-68	15–12 (5-10)	McCamish Pavilion; Atlanta, GA
March 3, 2013; 6:00 pm, ESPNU		NC State	**L** 57-70	15–13 (5-11)	McCamish Pavilion; Atlanta, GA
March 6, 2013; 9:00 pm, ACCN		at No. 6 Miami (FL)	**W** 71-69	16-13 (6-11)	BankUnited Center; Coral Gables, FL
March 9, 2013; 12:00 pm, ACCN		at Boston College	**L** 72-74	16–14 (6-12)	Conte Forum; Chestnut Hill, FL
2013 ACC tournament
March 14, 2013; 12:00 pm, ACCN/ESPN		vs. Boston College; 2013 ACC tournament first round	**L** 64-84	16–15	Greensboro Coliseum; Greensboro, NC
*Non-conference game. ^{#}Rankings from AP Poll. (#) Tournament seedings in parentheses. All times are in Eastern Time.

=== Maryland ===
Date time, TV	Rank^{#}	Opponent^{#}	Result	Record	Site city, state
ACC Regular Season
January 5, 2013; 12:00 pm, ACCN/ESPN3		Virginia Tech	**W** 94–71	13–1 (1-0)	Comcast Center; College Park, MD
January 9, 2013; 8:00 pm, ACCN		Florida State	**L** 62–65	13–2 (1-1)	Comcast Center; College Park, MD
January 13, 2013; 8:00 pm, ESPNU		at Miami (FL)	**L** 47-54	13–3 (1-2)	BankUnited Center; Coral Gables, FL
January 16, 2013; 7:00 pm, ESPN2		No. 11 NC State	**W** 51-50	14–3 (2-2)	Comcast Center; College Park, MD
January 19, 2013; 12:00 pm, ESPN		at North Carolina	**L** 52-62	14-4 (2-3)	Dean E. Smith Center; Chapel Hill, NC
January 22, 2013; 9:00 pm, ESPNU		Boston College	**W** 64-59	15–4 (3-3)	Comcast Center; College Park, MD
January 26, 2013; 1:00 pm, CBS		at No. 1 Duke	**L** 64-84	15–5 (3-4)	Cameron Indoor Stadium; Durham, NC
January 30, 2013; 8:00 pm, ACCN		at Florida State	**L** 71-73	15-6 (3-5)	Donald L. Tucker Center; Tallahassee, FL
February 2, 2013; 2:00 pm, RSN		Wake Forest	**W** 86-60	16-6 (4-5)	Comcast Center; College Park, MD
February 7, 2013; 9:00 pm, ACCN		at Virginia Tech	**W** 60-55	17–6 (5-5)	Cassell Coliseum; Blacksburg, VA
February 10, 2013; 1:00 pm, ACCN		Virginia	**L** 69-80	17-7 (5-6)	Comcast Center; College Park, MD
February 16, 2013; 6:00 pm, ESPN/ESPN2		No. 2 Duke	**W** 83-81	18–7 (6-6)	Comcast Center; College Park, MD
February 19, 2013; 9:00 pm, ACCN		at Boston College	**L** 58-69	18–8 (6-7)	Conte Forum; Chestnut Hill, MA
February 23, 2013; 12:00 pm, ESPN2		at Clemson	**W** 72-59	19-8 (7-7)	Comcast Center; College Park, MD
February 27, 2013; 8:00 pm, ACCN		at Georgia Tech	**L** 68-78	19–9 (7-8)	McCamish Pavilion; Atlanta, GA
March 2, 2013; 12:00 pm, ACCN		at Wake Forest	**W** 67-57	20–9 (8-8)	LJVM Coliseum; Winston-Salem, NC
March 6, 2013; 7:00 pm, ESPN/ESPN2		North Carolina	**L** 68-79	20–10 (8-9)	Comcast Center; College Park, MD
March 10, 2013; 6:00 pm, ESPNU		at Virginia	**L** 58-61	20–11 (8-10)	John Paul Jones Arena; Charlottesville, VA
2013 ACC tournament
March 14, 2013; 7:00 pm, ACCN/ESPN		vs. Wake Forest; 2013 ACC tournament first round	**W** 75-62	21–11	Greensboro Coliseum; Greensboro, NC
March 15, 2013; 7:00 pm, ACCN/ESPN		vs. No. 2 Duke; 2013 ACC tournament Quarterfinal	**W** 83-74	22–11	Greensboro Coliseum; Greensboro, NC
March 16, 2013; 3:30 pm, ACCN/ESPN		vs. North Carolina; 2013 ACC tournament Semifinal	**L** 76-79	22–12	Greensboro Coliseum; Greensboro, NC
2013 NIT
March 19, 2013*; 7:00 pm, ESPN2	No. (2)	No. (7) Niagara; 2013 NIT First Round	**W** 86-70	23–12	Comcast Center; College Park, MD
March 21, 2013*; 7:00 pm, ESPNU	No. (2)	No. (3) Denver; 2013 NIT Second Round	**W** 62-52	24–12	Comcast Center; College Park, MD
March 26, 2013*; 7:30 pm, ESPN	No. (2)	at No. (1) Alabama; 2013 NIT Quarterfinal	**W** 58-57	25–12	Coleman Coliseum; Tuscaloosa, AL
April 2, 2013*; 9:00 pm, ESPN	No. (2)	vs. No. (3) Iowa; 2013 NIT Semifinal			Madison Square Garden; New York, NY
*Non-conference game. ^{#}Rankings from AP Poll. (#) Tournament seedings in parentheses. All times are in Eastern Time (#) during NCAA tournament is seed with Region.

=== Miami ===
Date time, TV	Rank^{#}	Opponent^{#}	Result	Record	Site city, state
ACC Regular Season
January 5, 2013; 2:30 pm, ACCN		at Georgia Tech	**W** 62–49	10–3 (1-0)	McCamish Pavilion; Atlanta, GA
January 10, 2013; 7:00 pm, ESPN		at North Carolina	**W** 68–59	11–3 (2-0)	Dean E. Smith Center; Chapel Hill, NC
January 13, 2013; 8:00 pm, ESPNU		Maryland	**W** 54-47	12–3 (3-0)	BankUnited Center; Coral Gables, FL
January 16, 2013; 7:00 pm, ACCN		at Boston College	**W** 60-59	13-3 (4-0)	Conte Forum; Chestnut Hill, MA
January 23, 2013; 7:00 pm, ESPN	No. 25	No. 1 Duke	**W** 90-63	14–3 (5-0)	BankUnited Center; Coral Gables, FL
January 27, 2013; 6:00 pm, ESPNU	No. 25	Florida State	**W** 71-47	15–3 (6-0)	BankUnited Center; Coral Gables, FL
January 30, 2013; 9:00 pm, ACCN	No. 14	at Virginia Tech	**W** 73-64	16–3 (7-0)	Cassell Coliseum; Blacksburg, VA
February 2, 2013; 4:00 pm, CBS	No. 14	at No. 19 NC State	**W** 79-78	17–3 (8-0)	PNC Arena; Raleigh, NC
February 5, 2013; 7:00 pm, ACCN	No. 8	Boston College	**W** 72-50	18–3 (9-0)	BankUnited Center; Coral Gables, FL
February 9, 2013; 2:00 pm, ESPN/ESPN2	No. 8	North Carolina	**W** 87-61	19–3 (10-0)	BankUnited Center; Coral Gables, FL
February 13, 2013; 7:00 pm, ESPN/ESPN2	No. 3	at Florida State	**W** 74-68	20–3 (11-0)	Donald L. Tucker Center; Tallahassee, FL
February 17, 2013; 6:00 pm, ESPNU	No. 3	at Clemson	**W** 45-43	21-3 (12-0)	Littlejohn Coliseum; Clemson, SC
February 19, 2013; 9:00 pm, ESPNU	No. 2	Virginia	**W** 54-50	22–3 (13-0)	BankUnited Center; Coral Gables, FL
February 23, 2013; 1:00 pm, ACCN	No. 2	at Wake Forest	**L** 65-80	22-4 (13-1)	LJVM Coliseum; Winston-Salem, NC
February 27, 2013; 7:00 pm, ACCN	No. 5	Virginia Tech	**W** 76-58	23–4 (14-1)	BankUnited Center; Coral Gables, FL
March 2, 2013; 6:00 pm, ESPN	No. 5	at No. 3 Duke	**L** 76-79	23–5 (14-2)	Cameron Indoor Stadium; Durham, NC
March 6, 2013; 9:00 pm, ACCN	No. 6	Georgia Tech	**L** 69-71	23-6 (14-3)	BankUnited Center; Coral Gables, FL
March 9, 2013; 2:30 pm, ACCN	No. 6	Clemson	**W** 62-49	24–6 (15-3)	BankUnited Center; Coral Gables, FL
2013 ACC tournament
March 15, 2013; 12:00 pm, ACCN/ESPN	No. 9	vs. Boston College; 2013 ACC tournament Quarterfinal	**W** 69-58	25–6	Greensboro Coliseum; Greensboro, NC
March 16, 2013; 1:00 pm, ACCN/ESPN	No. 9	vs. NC State; 2013 ACC tournament Semifinal	**W** 81-71	26–6	Greensboro Coliseum; Greensboro, NC
March 17, 2013; 1:00 pm, ACCN/ESPN	No. 9	vs. North Carolina; 2013 ACC tournament Final	**W** 87-77	27–6	Greensboro Coliseum; Greensboro, NC
2013 NCAA tournament
March 22, 2013*; 2:10 pm, TNT	No. (2)	vs. No. (15) Pacific; 2013 NCAA tournament second round	**W** 78-49	28–6	Frank Erwin Center; Austin, TX
March 24, 2013*; 8:40 pm, TNT	No. (2)	vs. No. (7) Illinois; 2013 NCAA tournament Third Round	**W** 63-59	29-6	Frank Erwin Center; Austin, TX
March 28, 2013*; 7:15 pm, CBS	No. (2)	vs. No. (3) Marquette; 2013 NCAA tournament Sweet 16	**L** 61-71	29-7	Verizon Center; Washington, DC
*Non-conference game. ^{#}Rankings from AP Poll. (#) Tournament seedings in parentheses. All times are in Eastern Time.

=== North Carolina ===
Date time, TV	Rank^{#}	Opponent^{#}	Result	Record	Site city, state
ACC Regular Season
January 6, 2013; 8:00 pm, ESPNU		at Virginia	**L** 52–61	10–4 (0-1)	John Paul Jones Arena; Charlottesville, VA
January 10, 2013; 7:00 pm, ESPN		Miami	**L** 59–68	10–5 (0-2)	Dean E. Smith Center; Chapel Hill, NC
January 12, 2013; 2:00 pm, ESPN		at Florida State	**W** 77-72	11-5 (1-2)	Donald L. Tucker Center; Tallahassee, FL
January 19, 2013; 12:00 pm, ESPN		Maryland	**W** 62-52	12-5 (2-2)	Dean E. Smith Center; Chapel Hill, NC
January 23, 2013; 9:00 pm, ESPN		Georgia Tech	**W** 79-63	13-5 (3-2)	Dean E. Smith Center; Chapel Hill, NC
January 26, 2013; 7:00 pm, ESPN		at NC State	**L** 83-91	13-6 (3-3)	PNC Arena; Raleigh, NC
January 29, 2013; 9:00 pm, ESPNU		at Boston College	**W** 82-70	14-6 (4-3)	Conte Forum; Chestnut Hill, MA
February 2, 2013; 12:00 pm, ACCN		Virginia Tech	**W** 72-60 ^{OT}	15-6 (5-3)	Dean E. Smith Center; Chapel Hill, NC
February 5, 2013; 7:00 pm, ESPNU		Wake Forest	**W** 87–62	16–6 (6-3)	Dean E. Smith Center; Chapel Hill, NC
February 9, 2013; 2:00 pm, ESPN/ESPN2		at No. 8 Miami	**L** 61-87	16–7 (6-4)	BankUnited Center; Coral Gables, FL
February 13, 2013; 9:00 pm, ESPN/ACCN		at No. 2 Duke '**Carolina–Duke rivalry'**	**L** 68-73	16–8 (6-5)	Cameron Indoor Stadium; Durham, NC
February 16, 2013; 12:00 pm, ACCN		Virginia	**W** 93-81	17-8 (7-5)	Dean E. Smith Center; Chapel Hill, NC
February 19, 2013; 9:00 pm, ACCN		at Georgia Tech	**W** 70-58	18-8 (8–5)	McCamish Pavilion; Atlanta, GA
February 23, 2013; 4:00 pm, ESPN/ESPN2		NC State	**W** 76-65	19–8 (9-5)	Dean E. Smith Center; Chapel Hill, NC
February 28, 2013; 7:00 pm, ESPN/ESPN2		at Clemson	**W** 68-59	20–8 (10-5)	Littlejohn Coliseum; Clemson, SC
March 3, 2013; 2:00 pm, CBS		Florida State	**W** 79-58	21-8 (11–5)	Dean E. Smith Center; Chapel Hill, NC
March 6, 2013; 7:00 pm, ESPN/ESPN2		at Maryland	**W** 79-68	22–8 (12-5)	Comcast Center; College Park, MD
March 9, 2013; 9:00 pm, ESPN		No. 3 Duke '**College GameDay/Carolina–Duke rivalry'**	**L** 53–69	22–9 (12-6)	Dean E. Smith Center; Chapel Hill, NC
2013 ACC tournament
March 15, 2013; 9:30 pm, ACCN/ESPN		vs. Florida State; 2013 ACC tournament Quarterfinal	**W** 83-62	23–9	Greensboro Coliseum; Greensboro, NC
March 16, 2013; 3:30 pm, ACCN/ESPN		vs. Maryland; 2013 ACC tournament Semifinal	**W** 79-76	24–9	Greensboro Coliseum; Greensboro, NC
March 17, 2013; 1:00 pm, ACCN/ESPN		vs. No. 9 Miami; 2013 ACC tournament Final	**L** 77-87	24–10	Greensboro Coliseum; Greensboro, NC
2013 NCAA tournament
March 22, 2013*; 7:20 pm, TNT	No. (8)	vs. No. (9) Villanova; 2013 NCAA tournament second round	**W** 78-71	25–10	Sprint Center; Kansas City, MO
March 24, 2013*; 5:15 pm, CBS	No. (8)	vs. No. (1) Kansas; 2013 NCAA tournament Third Round	**L** 58-70	25–11	Sprint Center; Kansas City, MO
*Non-conference game. ^{#}Rankings from AP Poll. (#) Tournament seedings in parentheses. All times are in Eastern Time.

=== NC State ===
Date time, TV	Rank^{#}	Opponent^{#}	Result	Record	Site city, state
ACC Regular Season
January 5, 2013; 4:15 pm, ESPN2	No. 23	at Boston College	**W** 78–73	12–2 (1-0)	Conte Forum; Chestnut Hill, MA
January 9, 2013; 8:00 pm, ACCN	No. 20	Georgia Tech	**W** 83–70	13–2 (2-0)	PNC Arena; Raleigh, NC
January 12, 2013; 12:00 pm, ESPN	No. 20	No. 1 Duke	**W** 84-76	14-2 (3-0)	PNC Arena; Raleigh, NC
January 16, 2013; 7:00 pm, ESPN2	No. 14	at Maryland	**L** 50-51	14-3 (3-1)	Comcast Center; College Park, MD
January 20, 2013; 6:00 pm, ESPNU	No. 14	Clemson	**W** 66-62	15-3 (4-1)	PNC Arena; Raleigh, NC
January 22, 2013; 7:00 pm, RSN	No. 18	at Wake Forest	**L** 84-86	15-4 (4-2)	LJVM Coliseum; Winston-Salem, NC
January 26, 2013; 7:00 pm, ESPN	No. 18	North Carolina	**W** 91-83	16-4 (5-2)	PNC Arena; Raleigh, NC
January 29, 2013; 7:00 pm, ESPN2	No. 19	at Virginia	**L** 55-58	16-5 (5-3)	John Paul Jones Arena; Charlottesville, VA
February 2, 2013; 4:00 pm, CBS	No. 19	No. 14 Miami (FL)	**L** 78-79	16-6 (5-4)	PNC Arena; Raleigh, NC
February 7, 2013; 9:00 pm, ACCN		at No. 4 Duke	**L** 85-98	16-7 (5-5)	Cameron Indoor Stadium; Durham, NC
February 10, 2013; 1:00 pm, ACCN		at Clemson	**W** 58-57	17-7 (6-5)	Littlejohn Coliseum; Clemson, SC
February 16, 2013; 2:00 pm, ESPN/ESPN2		Virginia Tech	**W** 90-86 ^{OT}	18-7 (7-5)	PNC Arena; Raleigh, NC
February 19, 2013; 7:00 pm, ESPN2		Florida State	**W** 84-66	19–7 (8-5)	PNC Arena; Raleigh, NC
February 23, 2013; 4:00 pm, ESPN/ESPN2		at North Carolina	**L** 65-76	19–8 (8-6)	Dean E. Smith Center; Chapel Hill, NC
February 27, 2013; 8:00 pm, ACCN		Boston College	**W** 82-64	20–8 (9-6)	PNC Arena; Raleigh, NC
March 3, 2013; 6:00 pm, ESPNU		at Georgia Tech	**W** 70-57	21–8 (10-6)	McCamish Pavilion; Atlanta, GA
March 6, 2013; 9:00 pm, ACCN		Wake Forest	**W** 81-66	22-8 (11-6)	PNC Arena; Raleigh, NC
March 9, 2013; 2:00 pm, ESPN/ESPN2		at Florida State	**L** 67-71	22–9 (11-7)	Donald L. Tucker Center; Tallahassee, FL
2013 ACC tournament
March 14, 2013; 2:30 pm, ACCN/ESPN		vs. Virginia Tech; 2013 ACC tournament first round	**W** 80-63	23–9	Greensboro Coliseum; Greensboro, NC
March 15, 2013; 2:30 pm, ACCN/ESPN		vs. Virginia; 2013 ACC tournament Quarterfinal	**W** 75-56	24–9	Greensboro Coliseum; Greensboro, NC
March 16, 2013; 3:00 pm, ACCN/ESPN		vs. No. 9 Miami; 2013 ACC tournament Semifinal	**L** 71-81	24–10	Greensboro Coliseum; Greensboro, NC
2013 NCAA tournament
March 22, 2013*; 1:40 pm, TBS	No. (8)	vs. No. (9) Temple; 2013 NCAA tournament second round	**L** 72-76	24–11	University of Dayton Arena; Dayton, OH
*Non-conference game. ^{#}Rankings from AP Poll. (#) Tournament seedings in parentheses. All times are in Eastern Time.

=== Virginia ===
Date time, TV	Rank^{#}	Opponent^{#}	Result	Record	Site city, state
ACC Regular Season
January 6, 2013; 8:00 pm, ESPNU		North Carolina	**W** 61–52	11–3 (1-0)	John Paul Jones Arena; Charlottesville, VA
January 9, 2013; 9:00 pm, RSN		at Wake Forest	**L** 52–55	11–4 (1-1)	LJVM Coliseum; Winston-Salem, NC
January 12, 2013; 12:00 pm, ACCN		at Clemson	**L** 44-59	11–5 (1-2)	Littlejohn Coliseum; Clemson, SC
January 19, 2013; 4:00 pm, ACCN		Florida State	**W** 56-36	12–5 (2-2)	John Paul Jones Arena; Charlottesville, VA
January 24, 2013; 8:00 pm, ACCN		at Virginia Tech	**W** 74-58	13-5 (3-2)	Cassell Coliseum; Blacksburg, VA
January 26, 2013; 1:00 pm, ACCN		Boston College	**W** 65-51	14-5 (4-2)	John Paul Jones Arena; Charlottesville, VA
January 29, 2013; 7:00 pm, ESPN2		No. 19 NC State	**W** 58-55	15-5 (5-2)	John Paul Jones Arena; Charlottesville, VA
February 3, 2013; 3:00 pm, ESPNU		at Georgia Tech	**L** 60-66	15-6 (5-3)	Alexander Memorial Coliseum; Atlanta, GA
February 7, 2013; 7:00 pm, ESPN/ESPN2		Clemson	**W** 78-41	16-6 (6–3)	John Paul Jones Arena; Charlottesville, VA
February 10, 2013; 1:00 pm, ACCN		at Maryland	**W** 80-69	17-6 (7-3)	Comcast Center; College Park, MD
February 12, 2013; 7:00 pm, ESPNU		Virginia Tech	**W** 73-55	18-6 (8-3)	John Paul Jones Arena; Charlottesville, VA
February 16, 2013; 12:00 pm, ACCN		at North Carolina	**L** 81-93	18–7 (8-4)	Dean Smith Center; Chapel Hill, NC
February 19, 2013; 7:00 pm, ESPNU		at No. 2 Miami (FL)	**L** 50-54	18–8 (8-5)	BankUnited Center; Coral Gables, FL
February 24, 2013; 2:00 pm, ACCN		Georgia Tech	**W** 82-54	19–8 (9-5)	John Paul Jones Arena; Charlottesville, VA
February 28, 2013; 9:00 pm, ESPN/ESPN2		No. 3 Duke	**W** 73-68	20–8 (10-5)	John Paul Jones Arena; Charlottesville, VA
March 3, 2013; 4:00 pm, ACCN		at Boston College	**L** 52-53	20–9 (10-6)	Conte Forum; Chestnut Hill, MA
March 7, 2013; 7:00 pm, ESPN/ESPN2		at Florida State	**L** 51-53	20–10 (10-7)	Donald L. Tucker Center; Tallahassee, FL
March 10, 2013; 6:00 pm, ESPNU		Maryland	**W** 61-58	21–10 (11-7)	John Paul Jones Arena; Charlottesville, VA
2013 ACC tournament
March 15, 2013; 2:30 pm, ACCN/ESPN		vs. NC State; 2013 ACC tournament Quarterfinal	**L** 56-75	21–11	Greensboro Coliseum; Greensboro, NC
2013 NIT
March 19, 2013*; 9:00 pm, ESPNU	No. (1)	No. (8) Norfolk State; 2013 NIT First Round	**W** 67-56	22–11	John Paul Jones Arena; Charlottesville, VA
March 24, 2013*; 11:00 am, ESPN	No. (1)	No. (5) St. John's; 2013 NIT Second Round	**W** 68–50	23–11	John Paul Jones Arena; Charlottesville, VA
March 27, 2013*; 7:00 pm, ESPN2	No. (1)	No. (3) Iowa; 2013 NIT Quarterfinal	**L** 64-75	23-12	John Paul Jones Arena; Charlottesville, VA
*Non-conference game. ^{#}Rankings from AP Poll. (#) Tournament seedings in parentheses. All times are in Eastern Time.

=== Virginia Tech ===
Date time, TV	Rank^{#}	Opponent^{#}	Result	Record	Site city, state
ACC Regular Season
January 5, 2013; 12:00 pm, ACCN		at Maryland	**L** 62–80	9–5 (0-1)	Comcast Center; College Park, MD
January 9, 2013; 7:00 pm, RSN		Boston College	**L** 75–86	9–6 (0-2)	Cassell Coliseum; Blacksburg, VA
January 12, 2013; 2:30 pm, ACCN		at Georgia Tech	**W** 70-65 ^{OT}	10-6 (1-2)	Alexander Memorial Coliseum; Atlanta, GA
January 19, 2013; 2:00 pm, ACCN		Wake Forest	**W** 66-65	11-6 (2-2)	Cassell Coliseum; Blacksburg, VA
January 24, 2013; 8:00 pm, ACCN		Virginia	**L** 58-74	11-7 (2-3)	Cassell Coliseum; Blacksburg, VA
January 27, 2013; 1:00 pm, ACCN		at Clemson	**L** 70-77	11–8 (2-4)	Littlejohn Coliseum; Clemson, SC
January 30, 2013; 9:00 pm, RSN		No. 14 Miami (FL)	**L** 64-73	11–9 (2-5)	Cassell Coliseum; Blacksburg, VA
February 2, 2013; 12:00 pm, ACCN		North Carolina	**W** 72-60 ^{OT}	11–10 (2-6)	Cassell Coliseum; Blacksburg, VA
February 7, 2013; 9:00 pm, ACCN		Maryland	**L** 55-60	11–11 (2-7)	Cassell Coliseum; Blacksburg, VA
February 9, 2013; 1:00 pm, RSN		Georgia Tech	**L** 54-64	11–12 (2-8)	Cassell Coliseum; Blacksburg, VA
February 12, 2013; 7:00 pm, ESPNU		Virginia	**L** 55-73	11–13 (2-9)	John Paul Jones Arena; Charlottesville, VA
February 16, 2013; 2:00 pm, ESPN/ESPN2		at NC State	**L** 86-90 ^{OT}	11–14 (2-10)	PNC Arena; Raleigh, NC
February 21, 2013; 9:00 pm, ESPN/ESPN2		No. 6 Duke	**L** 56-88	11-15 (2-11)	Cassell Coliseum; Blacksburg, VA
February 24, 2013; 6:00 pm, ESPNU		Florida State	**W** 80-70	12–15 (3-11)	Cassell Coliseum; Blacksburg, VA
February 27, 2013; 7:00 pm, RSN		at No. 5 Miami (FL)	**L** 58-76	12–16 (3-12)	BankUnited Center; Coral Gables, FL
March 2, 2013; 8:00 pm, RSN		Clemson	**W** 69-61	13-16 (4–12)	Cassell Coliseum; Blacksburg, VA
March 5, 2013; 7:00 pm, ESPNU		at No. 3 Duke	**L** 57-85	13–17 (4-13)	Cameron Indoor Stadium; Durham, NC
March 10, 2013; 2:00 pm, ACCN		at Wake Forest	**L** 79-90	13–18 (4-14)	LJVM Coliseum; Winston-Salem, NC
2013 ACC tournament
March 14, 2013; 2:30 pm, ACCN/ESPN		vs. NC State; 2013 ACC tournament first round	**L** 63-80	13–19	Greensboro Coliseum; Greensboro, NC
*Non-conference game. ^{#}Rankings from AP Poll. (#) Tournament seedings in parentheses. All times are in Eastern Time.

=== Wake Forest ===
Date time, TV	Rank^{#}	Opponent^{#}	Result	Record	Site city, state
ACC Regular Season
January 5, 2013; 12:00 pm, ESPNU		at No. 1 Duke	**L** 62–80	7–6 (0-1)	Cameron Indoor Stadium; Durham, North Carolina
January 9, 2013; 9:00 pm, RSN		Virginia	**W** 55–52	8–6 (1-1)	LJVM Coliseum; Winston-Salem, North Carolina
January 12, 2013; 4:00 pm, RSN		Boston College	**W** 75-72	9–6 (2-1)	LJVM Coliseum; Winston-Salem, North Carolina
January 15, 2013; 7:00 pm, ESPNU		at Clemson	**L** 44-60	9–7 (2-2)	Littlejohn Coliseum; Clemson, South Carolina
January 19, 2013; 2:00 pm, ACCN		at Virginia Tech	**L** 65-66	9–8 (2-3)	Cassell Coliseum; Blacksburg, Virginia
January 22, 2013; 7:00 pm, RSN		No. 18 NC State	**W** 86-84	10–8 (3-3)	LJVM Coliseum; Winston-Salem, North Carolina
January 26, 2013; 3:00 pm, ACCN		at Georgia Tech	**L** 62-82	10–9 (3-4)	McCamish Pavilion; Atlanta, Georgia
January 30, 2013; 8:00 pm, ACCN		No. 5 Duke	**L** 70-75	10–10 (3-5)	LJVM Coliseum; Winston-Salem, North Carolina
February 2, 2013; 2:00 pm, RSN		at Maryland	**L** 60-86	10–11 (3-6)	Comcast Center; College Park, Maryland
February 5, 2013; 7:00 pm, ESPNU		at North Carolina	**L** 62-87	10–12 (3-7)	Dean Smith Center; Chapel Hill, North Carolina
February 9, 2013; 12:00 pm, ESPN/ESPN2		Florida State	**W** 71-46	11–12 (4-7)	LJVM Coliseum; Winston-Salem, North Carolina
February 13, 2013; 7:00 pm, RSN		at Boston College	**L** 63-66	11–13 (4-8)	Conte Forum; Chestnut Hill, Massachusetts
February 16, 2013; 2:00 pm, RSN		Georgia Tech	**L** 56-57	11-14 (4-9)	LJVM Coliseum; Winston-Salem, North Carolina
February 23, 2013; 1:00 pm, RSN		No. 2 Miami (FL)	**W** 80-65	12-14 (5-9)	LJVM Coliseum; Winston-Salem, North Carolina
February 26, 2013; 9:00 pm, ESPNU		at Florida State	**L** 62-76	12–15 (5-10)	Donald L. Tucker Center; Tallahassee, Florida
March 2, 2013; 12:00 pm, ACCN		Maryland	**L** 57-67	12–16 (5-11)	LJVM Coliseum; Winston-Salem, North Carolina
March 6, 2013; 9:00 pm, ACCN		at NC State	**L** 66-81	12–17 (5-12)	PNC Arena; Raleigh, North Carolina
March 10, 2013; 2:00 pm, ACCN		Virginia Tech	**W** 90-79	13–17 (6-12)	LJVM Coliseum; Winston-Salem, North Carolina
2013 ACC tournament
March 14, 2013; 7:00 pm, ACCN/ESPN		vs. Maryland; 2013 ACC tournament first round	**L** 62-75	13-18	Greensboro Coliseum; Greensboro, NC
*Non-conference game. ^{#}Rankings from AP Poll. (#) Tournament seedings in parentheses. All times are in Eastern Time.

== Postseason ==
=== ACC tournament ===
- March 14–17, 2013– Atlantic Coast Conference Basketball Tournament, Greensboro Coliseum, Greensboro, NC.

**2013 ACC men's basketball tournament seeds and results**
Seed	School	Record	Tiebreaker	First Round March 14	Quarterfinals March 15	Semifinals March 16	Championship March 17
1.‡†	Miami	15-3		Bye	Defeated Boston College 69-58	Defeated NC State 81-71	Defeated North Carolina 87-77
2.†	Duke	14-4		Bye	Eliminated by Maryland 74-83		
3.†	North Carolina	12-6		Bye	Defeated Florida State 83-62	Defeated Maryland 79-76	Eliminated by Miami 77-87
4.†	Virginia	11-7	1-0 vs. NC State	Bye	Eliminated by NC State 56-75		
5.	NC State	11-7	0-1 vs. Virginia	Defeated Virginia Tech 80-63	Defeated Virginia 75-56	Eliminated by Miami 71-81	
6.	Florida State	9-9		Defeated Clemson 73-69	Eliminated by North Carolina 62-83		
7.	Maryland	8-10		Defeated Wake Forest 75-62	Defeated Duke 83-74	Eliminated by North Carolina 76-79	
8.	Boston College	7-11		Defeated Georgia Tech 84-64	Eliminated by Miami 58-69		
9.	Georgia Tech	6-12	2-0 vs. Wake Forest	Eliminated by Boston College 64-84			
10.	Wake Forest	6–12	0-2 vs. Georgia Tech	Eliminated by Maryland 62-75			
11.	Clemson	5-13		Eliminated by Florida State 69-73			
12.	Virginia Tech	4–14		Eliminated by NC State 63-80			
‡ – ACC regular season champions, and tournament No. 1 seed. † – Received a single-bye in the conference tournament. Overall records include all games played in the ACC tournament.

=== NCAA tournament ===
Seed	Region	School	Round of 64	Round of 32	Sweet 16	Elite Eight	Final Four	Championship
2	Midwest	Duke	Defeated Albany 73-61	Defeated Creighton 66-50	Defeated Michigan State 71-61	Eliminated by Louisville 63-85		
2	East	Miami	Defeated Pacific 78-49	Defeated Illinois 63-59	Eliminated by Marquette 61-71			
8	South	North Carolina	Defeated Villanova 78-71	Eliminated by Kansas 58-70				
8	East	NC State	Eliminated by Temple 72-76					
	**Bids**	W-L (%):	3–1 .750	2–1 .667	1–1 .500	0–1 .000	0–0 –	TOTAL: 6–4 .600

=== National Invitation tournament ===
Seed	Region	School	First Round	Second Round	Quarterfinals	Semifinals	Finals
1	Virginia	Virginia	Defeated Norfolk State 67-56	Defeated St. John's 68–50	Eliminated by Iowa 64-75		
2	Alabama	Maryland	Defeated Niagara 86-70	Defeated Denver 62-52	Defeated Alabama 58-57	Eliminated by Iowa 71-60	
4	Southern Miss	Florida State	Eliminated by Louisiana Tech 66-71				
	**Bids**	W-L (%):	2–1 .667	2–0 1.000	1–1 .500	0–1 .000	TOTAL: 5–3 .625

=== NBA draft ===
Several players from the conference declared early for the NBA draft. The following all-conference selections were listed as seniors: . Several players were among the 60 players invited to the 2013 NBA Draft Combine.

== Honors and awards ==
=== Consensus All-Americans ===
- Mason Plumlee, Duke (Second Team)

=== All-ACC awards and teams ===
Player of the Year

- Erick Green, Virginia Tech (ACC media's selection)
- Shane Larkin, Miami (ACC coaches' selection)

Rookie of the Year

- Olivier Hanlan, Boston College

Coach of the Year

- Jim Larranaga, Miami

Defensive Player of the Year

- Durand Scott, Miami
