= 2012–13 Boston College Eagles men's basketball team =

American college basketball season

2012–13 Boston College Eagles men's basketball
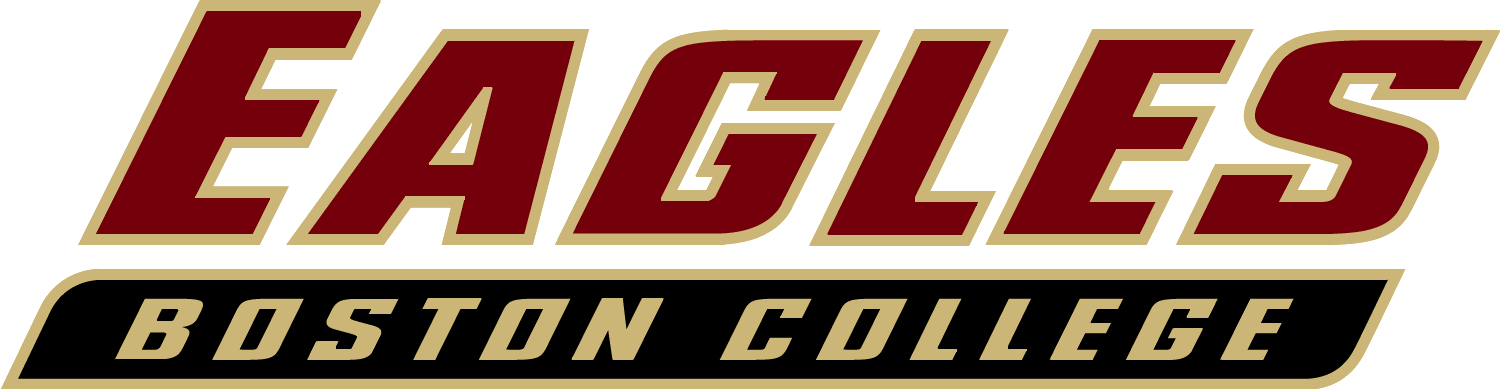
- Conference: Atlantic Coast Conference
- Record: 16–17 (7–11 ACC)
- Head coach: Steve Donahue
- Assistant coaches: Nat Graham; Woody Kampmann; Akbar Waheed
- Home arena: Conte Forum

2012–13 ACC men's basketball standings
	Conf.				Overall
Team	W		L	PCT	W		L	PCT
No. 5 Miami (FL) †	15	–	3	.833	29	–	7	.806
No. 6 Duke	14	–	4	.778	30	–	6	.833
North Carolina	12	–	6	.667	25	–	11	.694
Virginia	11	–	7	.611	23	–	12	.657
NC State	11	–	7	.611	24	–	11	.686
Florida State	9	–	9	.500	18	–	16	.529
Maryland	8	–	10	.444	25	–	13	.658
Boston College	7	–	11	.389	16	–	17	.485
Georgia Tech	6	–	12	.333	16	–	15	.516
Wake Forest	6	–	12	.333	13	–	18	.419
Clemson	5	–	13	.278	13	–	18	.419
Virginia Tech	4	–	14	.222	13	–	19	.406
† 2013 ACC tournament winner As of April 2, 2013; Rankings from AP Poll

The 2012–13 Boston College Eagles men's basketball team represented Boston College during the 2012–13 NCAA Division I men's basketball season. The Eagles were led by third year head coach Steve Donahue. The team played its home games at the Conte Forum on the campus of Boston College in Chestnut Hill, MA. Boston College competed in the Atlantic Coast Conference. They finished the season 16–17, 7–11 in ACC play to finish in eighth place.

The Eagles lost in the quarterfinals of the ACC tournament to Miami (FL).

== Departures ==
Name	Number	Pos.	Height	Weight	Year	Hometown	Notes
Salah Abdo	0	G	6'2"	188	Senior	Chelsea, MA	Graduated
Gabe Morton	1	G	6'1"	177	Sophomore	Saint Petersburg, FL	Transferred
Deirunas Visockas	2	G	6'4"	192	Senior	Kaunas, Lithuania	Graduated
Jordan Daniels	10	G	5'8"	153	Freshman	California	Transferred
Ryan Kilcullen	11	F	6'7'	214	Freshman	Hingham, MA	Transferred
Matt Humphrey	15	G	6'5"	185	RS Junior	Chicago, IL	Transferred
Peter Rehnquist	25	G/F	6'4"	210	Senior	Sharon, MA	Graduated
Dallas Elmore	30	G	6'5"	210	Junior	Fort Collins, CO	Left school

== Recruiting ==
College recruiting information
Name	Hometown	School	Height	Weight	Commit date
Olivier Hanlan; PG	Gatineau, Quebec	New Hampton School	6 ft 3 in (1.91 m)	185 lb (84 kg)	Oct 25, 2011
Olivier Hanlan; PG	Recruit ratings: Scout: Rivals: (89)				
Joe Rahon; PG	Del Mar, CA	Torrey Pines High School	6 ft 1 in (1.85 m)	175 lb (79 kg)	Oct 12, 2011
Joe Rahon; PG	Recruit ratings: Scout: Rivals: (80)				
Overall recruit ranking:
Note: In many cases, Scout, Rivals, 247Sports, On3, and ESPN may conflict in their listings of height and weight.; In these cases, the average was taken. ESPN grades are on a 100-point scale.; Sources: "2012 Team Ranking". Rivals.

== Roster ==
2012–13 Boston College Eagles men's basketball team
Players
Coaches

Pos.	#	Name	Height	Weight	Year	Hometown
F	4	Eddie Odio	6 ft 7 in (2.01 m)	202 lb (92 kg)	So	Miami, FL
C	5	KC Caudill	6 ft 10 in (2.08 m)	275 lb (125 kg)	So	Brea, CA
G	10	Jordan Daniels	5 ft 8 in (1.73 m)	153 lb (69 kg)	So	Fontana, CA
F	12	Ryan Anderson	6 ft 8 in (2.03 m)	220 lb (100 kg)	So	Lakewood, CA
F	13	John Cain Carney	6 ft 7 in (2.01 m)	220 lb (100 kg)	So	Philadelphia, PA
F	15	Andrew Van Nest	6 ft 10 in (2.08 m)	235 lb (107 kg)	GS	Weston, MA
G	20	Lonnie Jackson	6 ft 3 in (1.91 m)	173 lb (78 kg)	So	Valencia, CA
G	21	Olivier Hanlan	6 ft 4 in (1.93 m)	185 lb (84 kg)	Fr	Aylmer, QE
C	24	Dennis Clifford	7 ft 0 in (2.13 m)	246 lb (112 kg)	So	Bridgewater, MA
G	25	Joe Rahon	6 ft 2 in (1.88 m)	195 lb (88 kg)	Fr	San Diego, CA
G	31	Danny Rubin	6 ft 5 in (1.96 m)	185 lb (84 kg)	Jr	Chevy Chase, MD
G	33	Patrick Heckmann	6 ft 5 in (1.96 m)	199 lb (90 kg)	So	Mainz, Germany

Head coach

- Steve Donahue (Ursinus)

Assistant coach(es)

- Nat Graham (Penn)
- Woody Kampmann (Hobart)
- Akbar Waheed (Niagara)

Legend

- (C) Team captain
- (S) Suspended
- (I) Ineligible
- (W) Walk-on
- Injured
- Current redshirt

Roster
Last update: 2012-08-29

== Schedule and results ==
Date time, TV	Opponent	Result	Record	Site (attendance) city, state
Regular season
11/11/2012*; 2:00 pm, ESPN3	FIU	W 84–70	1–0	Conte Forum (2,811); Chestnut Hill, MA
11/15/2012*; 3:00 pm, ESPNU	vs. No. 16 Baylor; Charleston Classic First Round	L 74–84	1–1	TD Arena (2,686); Charleston, SC
11/16/2012*; 2:30 pm, ESPNU	vs. Dayton; Charleston Classic Consolation round	L 71–87	1–2	TD Arena (3,177); Charleston, SC
11/18/2012*; 12:00 pm, ESPN3	vs. Charleston; Charleston Classic 7th place game	L 67–71	1–3	TD Arena (4,262); Charleston, SC
11/21/2012*; 4:00 pm, ESPN3	Auburn	W 50–49	2–3	Conte Forum (3,102); Chestnut Hill, MA
11/25/2012*; 2:00 pm, ESPN3	Bryant	L 54–56	2–4	Conte Forum (2,265); Chestnut Hill, MA
11/28/2012*; 9:15 pm, ESPNU	at Penn State; ACC-Big Ten Challenge	W 73–61	3–4	Bryce Jordan Center (6,889); University Park, PA
12/04/2012*; 7:00 pm, ESPN3	Harvard; Rivalry	L 63–79	3–5	Conte Forum (3,128); Chestnut Hill, MA
12/08/2012*; 2:00 pm, ESPN3	St. Francis Brooklyn	W 72–64	4–5	Conte Forum (2,265); Chestnut Hill, MA
12/16/2012*; 1:00 pm, RSN/ESPN3	New Hampshire	W 61–59 ^{OT}	5–5	Conte Forum (2,163); Chestnut Hill, MA
12/22/2012*; 2:00 pm, ESPN3	Providence	W 71–68	6–5	Conte Forum (6,102); Chestnut Hill, MA
12/29/2012*; 2:00 pm, ESPN3	Holy Cross	W 70–60	7–5	Conte Forum (5,442); Chestnut Hill, MA
12/31/2012*; 2:00 pm, ESPN3	Dartmouth	W 79–58	8–5	Conte Forum (2,678); Chestnut Hill, MA
01/05/2013; 4:15 pm, ESPN2	No. 23 NC State	L 73–78	8–6 (0–1)	Conte Forum (6,248); Chestnut Hill, MA
01/09/2013; 7:00 pm, RSN/ESPN3	at Virginia Tech	W 86–75	9–6 (1–1)	Cassell Coliseum (6,054); Blacksburg, VA
01/12/2013; 4:00 pm, RSN/ESPN3	at Wake Forest	L 72–75	9–7 (1–2)	LJVM Coliseum (10,035); Winston-Salem, NC
01/16/2013; 7:00 pm, RSN/ESPN3	Miami (FL)	L 59–60	9–8 (1–3)	Conte Forum (3,624); Chestnut Hill, MA
01/22/2013; 9:00 pm, ESPNU	at Maryland	L 59–64	9–9 (1–4)	Comcast Center (13,941); College Park, MD
01/26/2013; 1:00 pm, RSN/ESPN3	at Virginia	L 51–65	9–10 (1–5)	John Paul Jones Arena (11,660); Charlottesville, VA
01/29/2013; 9:00 pm, ESPNU	North Carolina	L 70–82	9–11 (1–6)	Conte Forum (7,062); Chestnut Hill, MA
02/02/2013; 12:00 pm, ACCN/ESPN3	Clemson	W 75–68	10–11 (2–6)	Conte Forum (5,278); Chestnut Hill, MA
02/05/2013; 7:00 pm, RSN/ESPN3	at No. 8 Miami (FL)	L 50–72	10–12 (2–7)	BankUnited Center (5,149); Coral Gables, FL
02/10/2013; 6:00 pm, ESPNU	No. 4 Duke	L 61–62	10–13 (2–8)	Conte Forum (6,709); Chestnut Hill, MA
02/13/2013; 7:00 pm, RSN/ESPN3	Wake Forest	W 66–63	11–13 (3–8)	Conte Forum (2,867); Chestnut Hill, MA
02/16/2013; 12:00 pm, ACCN/ESPN3	at Florida State	L 66–69	11–14 (3–9)	Donald L. Tucker Center (6,557); Tallahassee, FL
02/19/2013; 9:00 pm, ACCN/ESPN3	Maryland	W 69–58	12–14 (4–9)	Conte Forum (4,338); Chestnut Hill, MA
02/24/2013; 2:00 pm, ACCN/ESPN3	at No. 6 Duke	L 68–89	12–15 (4–10)	Cameron Indoor Stadium (9,314); Durham, NC
02/27/2013; 8:00 pm, ACCN/ESPN3	at NC State	L 64–82	12–16 (4–11)	PNC Arena (15,807); Raleigh, NC
03/03/2013; 4:00 pm, ACCN/ESPN3	Virginia	W 53–52	13–16 (5–11)	Conte Forum (5,062); Chestnut Hill, MA
03/05/2013; 7:00 pm, RSN/ESPN3	at Clemson	W 68–61	14–16 (6–11)	Littlejohn Coliseum (7,102); Clemson, SC
03/09/2013; 12:00 pm, ACCN/ESPN3	Georgia Tech	W 74–72	15–16 (7–11)	Conte Forum (5,247); Chestnut Hill, MA
2013 ACC tournament
03/14/2013; 12:00 pm, ESPNU	vs. Georgia Tech; First Round	W 84–64	16–16	Greensboro Coliseum (22,169); Greensboro, NC
03/15/2013; 12:00 pm, ESPN2	vs. No. 9 Miami (FL); Quarterfinals	L 58–69	16–17	Greensboro Coliseum (22,169); Greensboro, NC
*Non-conference game. ^{#}Rankings from AP Poll. (#) Tournament seedings in parentheses. All times are in Eastern Time.
