= 2012–13 Clemson Tigers men's basketball team =

American college basketball season

2012–13 Clemson Tigers men's basketball
- Conference: Atlantic Coast Conference
- Record: 13–18 (5–13 ACC)
- Head coach: Brad Brownell
- Assistant coaches: Mike Winiecki; Earl Grant; Steve Smith
- Home arena: Littlejohn Coliseum

2012–13 ACC men's basketball standings
	Conf.				Overall
Team	W		L	PCT	W		L	PCT
No. 5 Miami (FL) †	15	–	3	.833	29	–	7	.806
No. 6 Duke	14	–	4	.778	30	–	6	.833
North Carolina	12	–	6	.667	25	–	11	.694
Virginia	11	–	7	.611	23	–	12	.657
NC State	11	–	7	.611	24	–	11	.686
Florida State	9	–	9	.500	18	–	16	.529
Maryland	8	–	10	.444	25	–	13	.658
Boston College	7	–	11	.389	16	–	17	.485
Georgia Tech	6	–	12	.333	16	–	15	.516
Wake Forest	6	–	12	.333	13	–	18	.419
Clemson	5	–	13	.278	13	–	18	.419
Virginia Tech	4	–	14	.222	13	–	19	.406
† 2013 ACC tournament winner As of April 2, 2013; Rankings from AP Poll

The 2012–13 Clemson Tigers men's basketball team represented Clemson University in the 2012–2013 college basketball season. The Tigers, led by third year head coach Brad Brownell, played their home games at Littlejohn Coliseum and were members of the Atlantic Coast Conference. They finished the season 13–18, 5–13 in ACC play to finish in 11th place.

They lost in the first round of the ACC tournament to Florida State.

== Departures ==
Name	Number	Pos.	Height	Weight	Year	Hometown	Notes
Tanner Smith	5	G	6'5"	210	Senior	Alpharetta, GA	Graduated
Catalin Baciu	10	C	7'2"	255	Senior	Cluj-Napoca, Romania	Graduated
Andre Young	11	G	5'9"	175	Senior	Albany, GA	Graduated
Bryan Narcisse	21	F	6'6"	225	Senior	North Augusta, SC	Graduated

== Recruiting ==
College recruiting information
Name	Hometown	School	Height	Weight	Commit date
Jaron Blossomgame; PF	Alpharetta, GA	Chattahoochee High School	6 ft 7 in (2.01 m)	200 lb (91 kg)	Feb 12, 2011
Jaron Blossomgame; PF	Recruit ratings: Scout: Rivals: (92)				
Adonis Filer; PG	Chicago, IL	Notre Dame Preparatory School	6 ft 2 in (1.88 m)	185 lb (84 kg)	Nov 8, 2011
Adonis Filer; PG	Recruit ratings: Scout: Rivals: (POST)				
Landry Nnoko; C	Yaounde, Cameroon	Montverde Academy	6 ft 11 in (2.11 m)	220 lb (100 kg)	Nov 3, 2011
Landry Nnoko; C	Recruit ratings: Scout: Rivals: (89)				
Jordan Roper; PG	Columbia, SC	Irmo High School	6 ft 0 in (1.83 m)	160 lb (73 kg)	Jun 9, 2011
Jordan Roper; PG	Recruit ratings: Scout: Rivals: (88)				
Josh Smith; PF	Charlotte, NC	Olympic High School	6 ft 7 in (2.01 m)	260 lb (120 kg)	Aug 13, 2011
Josh Smith; PF	Recruit ratings: Scout: Rivals: (88)				
Overall recruit ranking:
Note: In many cases, Scout, Rivals, 247Sports, On3, and ESPN may conflict in their listings of height and weight.; In these cases, the average was taken. ESPN grades are on a 100-point scale.; Sources: "2012 Team Ranking". Rivals.

== Roster ==
2012–13 Clemson Tigers men's basketball team
Players
Coaches

Pos.	#	Name	Height	Weight	Year	Hometown
G	1	T. J. Sapp	6 ft 2 in (1.88 m)	195 lb (88 kg)	So	Fort Lauderdale, Florida
G	2	Carson Fields	6 ft 4 in (1.93 m)	200 lb (91 kg)	So	Pewee Valley, Kentucky
G	3	Adonis Filer	6 ft 2 in (1.88 m)	185 lb (84 kg)	Fr	Chicago, Illinois
F	5	Jaron Blossomgame	6 ft 7 in (2.01 m)	190 lb (86 kg)	Fr	Alpharetta, Georgia
G	12	Rod Hall	6 ft 1 in (1.85 m)	210 lb (95 kg)	So	Augusta, Georgia
G	15	Devin Coleman	6 ft 2 in (1.88 m)	200 lb (91 kg)	So	Philadelphia, Pennsylvania
G	20	Jordan Roper	5 ft 11 in (1.8 m)	155 lb (70 kg)	Fr	Columbia, South Carolina
F	21	Demarcus Harrison	6 ft 4 in (1.93 m)	195 lb (88 kg)	So	Greenwood, South Carolina
F	22	Bernard Sullivan	6 ft 7 in (2.01 m)	230 lb (104 kg)	So	Gastonia, North Carolina
F	24	Milton Jennings	6 ft 9 in (2.06 m)	225 lb (102 kg)	Sr	Summerville, South Carolina
F/C	31	Devin Booker	6 ft 8 in (2.03 m)	250 lb (113 kg)	Sr	Whitmire, South Carolina
G	32	K. J. McDaniels	6 ft 6 in (1.98 m)	195 lb (88 kg)	So	Birmingham, Alabama
F	33	Josh Smith	6 ft 8 in (2.03 m)	255 lb (116 kg)	Fr	Charlotte, North Carolina
C	35	Landry Nnoko	6 ft 10 in (2.08 m)	240 lb (109 kg)	Fr	Yaounde, Cameroon

Head coach

- Brad Brownell (DePauw)

Assistant coach(es)

- Mike Winiecki (Richmond)
- Earl Grant (Georgia College)
- Steve Smith (Morgan State)

Legend

- (C) Team captain
- (S) Suspended
- (I) Ineligible
- (W) Walk-on
- Injured
- Current redshirt

Roster
Last update: 2012-09-25

== Schedule ==
Date time, TV	Opponent	Result	Record	Site (attendance) city, state
Exhibition
11/05/2012*; 7:00 pm	Lander	W 72–42		Littlejohn Coliseum (N/A); Clemson, SC
Regular season
11/12/2012*; 7:00 pm, ESPN3	Presbyterian	W 77–44	1–0	Littlejohn Coliseum (4,500); Clemson, SC
11/16/2012*; 7:00 pm, ESPN3	at Furman	W 72–55	2–0	Timmons Arena (2,746); Greenville, SC
11/22/2012*; 9:00 pm, ESPN2	vs. No. 17 Gonzaga; Old Spice Classic Quarterfinals	L 49–57	2–1	HP Field House (2,076); Lake Buena Vista, FL
11/23/2012*; 5:30 pm, ESPN2	vs. UTEP; Old Spice Classic Consolation Game	W 69–48	3–1	HP Field House (2,205); Lake Buena Vista, FL
11/25/2012*; 11:30 am, ESPNU	vs. Marist; Old Spice Classic Fifth Place Game	W 59–44	4–1	HP Field House (1,080); Lake Buena Vista, FL
11/28/2012*; 7:15 pm, ESPNU	Purdue; ACC–Big Ten Challenge	L 61–73	4–2	Littlejohn Coliseum (7,632); Clemson, SC
12/02/2012*; 12:00 pm, ESPNU	at South Carolina	W 64–55	5–2	Colonial Life Arena (10,684); Columbia, SC
12/08/2012*; 8:00 pm, ESPN2	No. 8 Arizona	L 54–66	5–3	Littlejohn Coliseum (8,509); Clemson, SC
12/15/2012*; 7:00 pm, ESPN3	Florida A&M	W 80–57	6–3	Littlejohn Coliseum (7,862); Clemson, SC
12/19/2012*; 7:00 pm, ESPN3	at Coastal Carolina	L 46–69	6–4	HTC Center (3,286); Conway, SC
12/23/2012*; 2:00 pm, ESPN3	South Carolina State	W 77–41	7–4	Littlejohn Coliseum (7,431); Clemson, SC
01/01/2013*; 4:00 pm, ESPN3	The Citadel	W 92–51	8–4	Littlejohn Coliseum (7,124); Clemson, SC
01/05/2013; 4:00 pm, RSN/ESPN3	Florida State	L 66–71	8–5 (0–1)	Littlejohn Coliseum (7,635); Clemson, SC
01/08/2013; 7:00 pm, ESPNU	at No. 1 Duke	L 40–68	8–6 (0–2)	Cameron Indoor Stadium (9,314); Durham, NC
01/12/2013; 12:00 pm, ACCN/ESPN3	Virginia	W 59–44	9–6 (1–2)	Littlejohn Coliseum (7,795); Clemson, SC
01/15/2013; 7:00 pm, ESPNU	Wake Forest	W 60–44	10–6 (2–2)	Littlejohn Coliseum (7,291); Clemson, SC
01/20/2013; 6:00 pm, ESPNU	at No. 14 NC State	L 62–66	10–7 (2–3)	PNC Arena (19,557); Raleigh, NC
01/24/2013; 8:00 pm, ACCN/ESPN3	at Florida State	L 57–60	10–8 (2–4)	Donald L. Tucker Center (7,893); Tallahassee, FL
01/27/2013; 1:00 pm, ACCN/ESPN3	Virginia Tech	W 77–70	11–8 (3–4)	Littlejohn Coliseum (7,980); Clemson, SC
01/29/2013; 7:00 pm, RSN/ESPN3	Georgia Tech	W 63–60	12–8 (4–4)	Littlejohn Coliseum (7,059); Clemson, SC
02/02/2013; 12:00 pm, ACCN/ESPN3	at Boston College	L 68–75	12–9 (4–5)	Conte Forum (5,278); Chestnut Hill, MA
02/07/2013; 7:00 pm, ESPN2	at Virginia	L 41–78	12–10 (4–6)	John Paul Jones Arena (9,942); Charlottesville, VA
02/10/2013; 1:00 pm, ACCN/ESPN3	NC State	L 57–58	12–11 (4–7)	Littlejohn Coliseum (9,455); Clemson, SC
02/14/2013; 7:00 pm, RSN/ESPN3	at Georgia Tech	W 56–53	13–11 (5–7)	McCamish Pavilion (6,862); Atlanta, GA
02/17/2013; 6:00 pm, ESPNU	No. 3 Miami (FL)	L 43–45	13–12 (5–8)	Littlejohn Coliseum (8,998); Clemson, SC
02/23/2013; 12:00 pm, ESPN2	at Maryland	L 59–72	13–13 (5–9)	Comcast Center (15,373); College Park, MD
02/28/2013; 7:00 pm, ESPN	North Carolina	L 59–68	13–14 (5–10)	Littlejohn Coliseum (9,778); Clemson, SC
03/02/2013; 8:00 pm, RSN/ESPN3	at Virginia Tech	L 61–69	13–15 (5–11)	Cassell Coliseum (5,184); Blacksburg, VA
03/05/2013; 7:00 pm, RSN/ESPN3	Boston College	L 61–68	13–16 (5–12)	Littlejohn Coliseum (7,102); Clemson, SC
03/09/2013; 2:30 pm, ACCN/ESPN3	at No. 6 Miami (FL)	L 49–62	13–17 (5–13)	BankUnited Center (7,972); Coral Gables, FL
ACC tournament
03/14/2013; 9:38 pm, ESPNU/ACCN	vs. Florida State; First Round	L 69–73	13–18	Greensboro Coliseum (22,169); Greensboro, NC
*Non-conference game. ^{#}Rankings from AP Poll. (#) Tournament seedings in parentheses. All times are in Eastern Time.
