= 2013 ACC men's basketball tournament =

- 2013 ACC Tournament logo
- Classification: Division I
- Season: 2012–13
- Teams: 12
- Site: Greensboro Coliseum; Greensboro, North Carolina
- Champions: Miami (1st title)
- Winning coach: Jim Larrañaga (1st title)
- MVP: Shane Larkin (Miami)
- Television: ESPN/ACC Network

2012–13 ACC men's basketball standings
| | Conf. | | | | Overall |
| Team | W | | L | PCT | W | | L | PCT |
|---|---|---|---|---|---|---|---|---|
| No. 5 Miami (FL) † | 15 | – | 3 | .833 | 29 | – | 7 | .806 |
| No. 6 Duke | 14 | – | 4 | .778 | 30 | – | 6 | .833 |
| North Carolina | 12 | – | 6 | .667 | 25 | – | 11 | .694 |
| Virginia | 11 | – | 7 | .611 | 23 | – | 12 | .657 |
| NC State | 11 | – | 7 | .611 | 24 | – | 11 | .686 |
| Florida State | 9 | – | 9 | .500 | 18 | – | 16 | .529 |
| Maryland | 8 | – | 10 | .444 | 25 | – | 13 | .658 |
| Boston College | 7 | – | 11 | .389 | 16 | – | 17 | .485 |
| Georgia Tech | 6 | – | 12 | .333 | 16 | – | 15 | .516 |
| Wake Forest | 6 | – | 12 | .333 | 13 | – | 18 | .419 |
| Clemson | 5 | – | 13 | .278 | 13 | – | 18 | .419 |
| Virginia Tech | 4 | – | 14 | .222 | 13 | – | 19 | .406 |
† 2013 ACC tournament winner As of April 2, 2013; Rankings from AP Poll

The 2013 Atlantic Coast Conference men's basketball tournament took place from March 14 to 17 at the Greensboro Coliseum in Greensboro, North Carolina. For the second consecutive year, a team from the state of Florida captured its first-ever ACC Men's Basketball Tournament title, as the Miami Hurricanes won the championship. The 2013 tournament was the final ACC Tournament with 12 teams, as Pittsburgh, Syracuse, and Notre Dame joined the ACC for the 2013–14 season.

== Broadcasting ==
Games were broadcast on both the networks of ESPN and over-the-air in ACC markets via Raycom Sports' ACC Network. Due to ESPN's new contract with the conference, the ACC Network no longer had exclusivity in broadcasting the tournament in ACC markets, allowing ESPN's feed to be carried.

== Seeds ==
Teams are seeded based on the final regular season standings, with ties broken under an ACC policy.

2013 ACC Men's Basketball Tournament seeds
| Seed | School | Conf. | Over. | Tiebreaker |
| 1†‡ | Miami | 15–3 | 24–6 | |
| 2† | Duke | 14–4 | 27–4 | |
| 3† | North Carolina | 12–6 | 22–9 | |
| 4† | Virginia | 11–7 | 21–10 | 1–0 vs. NC St. |
| 5 | NC State | 11–7 | 22–9 | 0–1 vs. UVA |
| 6 | Florida State | 9–9 | 18–14 | |
| 7 | Maryland | 8–10 | 20–11 | |
| 8 | Boston College | 7–11 | 15–16 | |
| 9 | Georgia Tech | 6–12 | 16–14 | 2–0 vs. Wake |
| 10 | Wake Forest | 6–12 | 13–17 | 0–2 vs. GT |
| 11 | Clemson | 5–13 | 13–17 | |
| 12 | Virginia Tech | 4–14 | 13–18 | |
‡ – ACC regular season champions. † – Received a bye in the conference tournament. Overall records are as of the end of the regular season.

== Schedule ==
| Session | Game | Time* | Matchup^{#} | Television | Attendance |
First round – Thursday, March 14
| 1 | 1 | Noon | #8 Boston College vs. #9 Georgia Tech | ESPNU/ACC Network | |
| 1 | 2 | 2:00 pm | #5 NC State vs. #12 Virginia Tech | ESPNU/ACC Network | |
| 2 | 3 | 7:00 pm | #7 Maryland vs. #10 Wake Forest | ESPNU/ACC Network | |
| 2 | 4 | 9:00 pm | #6 Florida State vs. #11 Clemson | ESPNU/ACC Network | |
Quarterfinals – Friday, March 15
| 3 | 5 | Noon | #1 Miami vs. #8 Boston College | ESPN2/ACC Network | |
| 3 | 6 | 2:00 pm | #4 Virginia vs. #5 NC State | ESPN2/ACC Network | |
| 4 | 7 | 7:00 pm | #2 Duke vs. #7 Maryland | ESPN2/ACC Network | |
| 4 | 8 | 9:00 pm | #3 North Carolina vs. #6 Florida State | ESPN2/ACC Network | |
Semifinals – Saturday, March 16
| 5 | 9 | 1:00 pm | #1 Miami vs. #5 NC State | ESPN/ACC Network | |
| 5 | 10 | 3:00 pm | #3 North Carolina vs. #7 Maryland | ESPN/ACC Network | |
Championship Game – Sunday, March 17
| 6 | 11 | 1:00 pm | #1 Miami vs. #3 North Carolina | ESPN/ACC Network | |
*Game Times in ET. #-Rankings denote tournament seeding.

== Bracket ==
First round Thursday, March 14; ESPNU/ACC Network
8 | Boston College | 84
9 | Georgia Tech | 64
5 | NC State | 80
12 | Virginia Tech | 63
7 | Maryland | 75
10 | Wake Forest | 62
6 | Florida State | 73
11 | Clemson | 69

Quarterfinals; Friday, March 15; ESPN2/ACC Network
1 | #9 Miami | 69
8 | Boston College | 58
4 | Virginia | 56
5 | NC State | 75
2 | #2 Duke | 74
7 | Maryland | 83
3 | North Carolina | 83
6 | Florida State | 62

Semifinals; Saturday, March 16; ESPN/ACC Network
1 | #9 Miami | 81
5 | NC State | 71
7 | Maryland | 76
3 | North Carolina | 79

Championship Game; Sunday, March 17; ESPN/ACC Network
1 | #9 Miami | 87
3 | North Carolina | 77

== Awards and honors ==
Tournament MVP

- Shane Larkin, Miami

All-Tournament Teams

First Team

- Shane Larkin, Miami
- Durand Scott, Miami
- Reggie Bullock, North Carolina
- P. J. Hairston, North Carolina
- Dez Wells, Maryland

Second Team

- Trey McKinney Jones, Miami
- Julian Gamble, Miami
- Marcus Paige, North Carolina
- Scott Wood, N.C. State
- Olivier Hanlan, Boston College
