= 2012–13 Virginia Tech Hokies men's basketball team =

American college basketball season

2012–13 Virginia Tech Hokies men's basketball
- Conference: Atlantic Coast Conference
- Record: 13–19 (4–14 ACC)
- Head coach: James Johnson (1st season)
- Assistant coaches: Kurt Kanaskie; Mark Byington; Ramon Williams
- Home arena: Cassell Coliseum

2012–13 ACC men's basketball standings
| | Conf. | | | | Overall |
| Team | W | | L | PCT | W | | L | PCT |
|---|---|---|---|---|---|---|---|---|
| No. 5 Miami (FL) † | 15 | – | 3 | .833 | 29 | – | 7 | .806 |
| No. 6 Duke | 14 | – | 4 | .778 | 30 | – | 6 | .833 |
| North Carolina | 12 | – | 6 | .667 | 25 | – | 11 | .694 |
| Virginia | 11 | – | 7 | .611 | 23 | – | 12 | .657 |
| NC State | 11 | – | 7 | .611 | 24 | – | 11 | .686 |
| Florida State | 9 | – | 9 | .500 | 18 | – | 16 | .529 |
| Maryland | 8 | – | 10 | .444 | 25 | – | 13 | .658 |
| Boston College | 7 | – | 11 | .389 | 16 | – | 17 | .485 |
| Georgia Tech | 6 | – | 12 | .333 | 16 | – | 15 | .516 |
| Wake Forest | 6 | – | 12 | .333 | 13 | – | 18 | .419 |
| Clemson | 5 | – | 13 | .278 | 13 | – | 18 | .419 |
| Virginia Tech | 4 | – | 14 | .222 | 13 | – | 19 | .406 |
† 2013 ACC tournament winner As of April 2, 2013; Rankings from AP Poll

The 2012–13 Virginia Tech Hokies men's basketball team represented Virginia Polytechnic Institute and State University during the 2012–13 NCAA Division I men's basketball season. The Hokies, led by first year head coach James Johnson, played their home games at Cassell Coliseum and were members of the Atlantic Coast Conference. They finished the season 13–19, 4–14 in ACC play to finish in last place.

They lost in the first round of the ACC tournament to NC State.

== Roster ==
| Number | Name | Position | Height | Weight | Year | Hometown |
|---|---|---|---|---|---|---|
| 1 | Robert Brown | Guard | 6–5 | 190 | Sophomore | Clermont, Florida |
| 2 | Joey van Zegeren | Forward | 6–10 | 225 | RS Freshman | Hoogeveen, Netherlands |
| 3 | Adam Smith | Guard | 6–1 | 170 | Sophomore | Jonesboro, Georgia |
| 4 | Cadarian Raines | Forward | 6–9 | 238 | RS Sophomore | Petersburg, Virginia |
| 5 | Marcus Patrick | Guard | 5–9 | 165 | Freshman | Rustburg, Virginia |
| 10 | Marquis Rankin | Guard | 6–1 | 170 | Sophomore | Charlotte, North Carolina |
| 11 | Erick Green | Guard | 6–3 | 185 | Senior | Winchester, Virginia |
| 22 | Christian Beyer | Forward | 6–7 | 200 | Sophomore | New Bern, North Carolina |
| 24 | Joey Racer | Guard | 6–1 | 185 | Senior | Berryville, Virginia |
| 25 | Will Johnston | Guard | 6–3 | 190 | Sophomore | Midlothian, Virginia |
| 31 | Jarell Eddie | Forward | 6–7 | 218 | Junior | Charlotte, North Carolina |
| 33 | Marshall Wood | Forward | 6–8 | 210 | Freshman | Rustburg, Virginia |
| 42 | C. J. Barksdale | Forward | 6–8 | 232 | Sophomore | Danville, Virginia |

== Schedule ==
| Date time, TV | Opponent | Result | Record | Site (attendance) city, state |
Regular season
| 11/10/2012*; 2:00 pm, ESPN3 | East Tennessee State | W 80–62 | 1–0 | Cassell Coliseum (6,632); Blacksburg, VA |
| 11/12/2012*; 7:00 pm, ESPN3 | Rhode Island | W 69–50 | 2–0 | Cassell Coliseum (6,270); Blacksburg, VA |
| 11/15/2012*; 7:00 pm, ESPN3 | VMI | W 95–80 | 3–0 | Cassell Coliseum (6,883); Blacksburg, VA |
| 11/19/2012*; 7:00 pm, ESPN3 | at UNC Greensboro | W 96–87 | 4–0 | Greensboro Coliseum (3,082); Greensboro, NC |
| 11/23/2012*; 2:00 pm, ESPN3 | Appalachian State | W 87–76 | 5–0 | Cassell Coliseum (7,094); Blacksburg, VA |
| 11/27/2012*; 7:15 pm, ESPNU | Iowa; ACC-Big Ten Challenge | W 95–79 | 6–0 | Cassell Coliseum (5,647); Blacksburg, VA |
| 12/01/2012*; 2:00 pm, ESPN3 | No. 15 Oklahoma State | W 81–71 | 7–0 | Cassell Coliseum (7,552); Blacksburg, VA |
| 12/08/2012*; 4:00 pm, ESPN2 | at West Virginia | L 67–68 | 7–1 | WVU Coliseum (11,631); Morgantown, WV |
| 12/10/2012*; 7:00 pm, ESPN3 | Mississippi Valley State; Las Vegas Classic | W 70–49 | 8–1 | Cassell Coliseum (4,926); Blacksburg, VA |
| 12/15/2012*; 2:00 pm, ESPN3 | Georgia Southern; Las Vegas Classic | L 73–78 | 8–2 | Cassell Coliseum (6,026); Blacksburg, VA |
| 12/22/2012*; 8:00 pm | vs. Bradley; Las Vegas Classic semifinals | W 66–65 ^{OT} | 9–2 | Orleans Arena (N/A); Paradise, NV |
| 12/23/2012*; 11:30 pm, CBSSN | vs. Colorado State; Las Vegas Classic Championship | L 52–88 | 9–3 | Orleans Arena (N/A); Paradise, NV |
| 12/29/2012*; 2:00 pm, ESPNU | vs. BYU | L 71–97 | 9–4 | EnergySolutions Arena (15,684); Salt Lake City, UT |
| 01/05/2013; 12:00 pm, ACCN/ESPN3 | at Maryland | L 71–94 | 9–5 (0–1) | Comcast Center (17,950); College Park, MD |
| 01/09/2013; 7:00 pm, RSN/ESPN3 | Boston College | L 75–86 | 9–6 (0–2) | Cassell Coliseum (6,054); Blacksburg, VA |
| 01/12/2013; 2:30 pm, ACCN/ESPN3 | at Georgia Tech | W 70–65 ^{OT} | 10–6 (1–2) | Alexander Memorial Coliseum (7,675); Atlanta, GA |
| 01/19/2013; 2:00 pm, ACCN/ESPN3 | Wake Forest | W 66–65 | 11–6 (2–2) | Cassell Coliseum (6,418); Blacksburg, VA |
| 01/24/2013; 8:00 pm, ACCN/ESPN3 | Virginia | L 58–74 | 11–7 (2–3) | Cassell Coliseum (7,222); Blacksburg, VA |
| 01/27/2013; 1:00 pm, ACCN/ESPN3 | at Clemson | L 70–77 | 11–8 (2–4) | Littlejohn Coliseum (7,980); Clemson, SC |
| 01/30/2013; 9:00 pm, RSN/ESPN3 | No. 14 Miami (FL) | L 64–73 | 11–9 (2–5) | Cassell Coliseum (5,436); Blacksburg, VA |
| 02/02/2013; 12:00 pm, ACCN/ESPN3 | North Carolina | L 60–72 ^{OT} | 11–10 (2–6) | Cassell Coliseum (20,762); Blacksburg, VA |
| 02/07/2013; 9:00 pm, ACCN/ESPN3 | Maryland | L 55–60 | 11–11 (2–7) | Cassell Coliseum (5,465); Blacksburg, VA |
| 02/09/2013; 1:00 pm, RSN/ESPN3 | Georgia Tech | L 54–64 | 11–12 (2–8) | Cassell Coliseum (6,006); Blacksburg, VA |
| 02/12/2013; 7:00 pm, ESPNU | at Virginia | L 55–73 | 11–13 (2–9) | John Paul Jones Arena (11,764); Charlottesville, VA |
| 02/16/2013; 2:00 pm, ESPN2 | at NC State | L 86–90 ^{OT} | 11–14 (2–10) | PNC Arena (18,257); Raleigh, NC |
| 02/21/2013; 9:00 pm, ESPN | No. 6 Duke | L 56–88 | 11–15 (2–11) | Cassell Coliseum (7,585); Blacksburg, VA |
| 02/24/2013; 6:00 pm, ESPNU | Florida State | W 80–70 | 12–15 (3–11) | Cassell Coliseum (5,042); Blacksburg, VA |
| 02/27/2013; 7:00 pm, RSN/ESPN3 | at No. 5 Miami (FL) | L 58–76 | 12–16 (3–12) | BankUnited Center (7,434); Coral Gables, FL |
| 03/02/2013; 8:00 pm, RSN/ESPN3 | Clemson | W 69–61 | 13–16 (4–12) | Cassell Coliseum (5,184); Blacksburg, VA |
| 03/05/2013; 7:00 pm, ESPNU | at No. 3 Duke | L 57–85 | 13–17 (4–13) | Cameron Indoor Stadium (9,314); Durham, NC |
| 03/10/2013; 2:00 pm, ACCN/ESPN3 | at Wake Forest | L 79–90 | 13–18 (4–14) | LJVM Coliseum (10,788); Winston-Salem, NC |
ACC men's basketball tournament
| 03/14/2013; 2:30 pm, ESPNU | vs. NC State; First Round | L 63–80 | 13–19 | Greensboro Coliseum (22,169); Greensboro, NC |
*Non-conference game. ^{#}Rankings from AP Poll. (#) Tournament seedings in parentheses. All times are in Eastern Time.
