= 2012–13 Wake Forest Demon Deacons men's basketball team =

American college basketball season

2012–13 Wake Forest Demon Deacons men's basketball
- Conference: Atlantic Coast Conference
- Record: 13–18 (6–12 ACC)
- Head coach: Jeff Bzdelik (3rd season)
- Assistant coaches: Jeff Battle; Rusty LaRue; Walt Corbean
- Home arena: LJVM Coliseum

2012–13 ACC men's basketball standings
	Conf.				Overall
Team	W		L	PCT	W		L	PCT
No. 5 Miami (FL) †	15	–	3	.833	29	–	7	.806
No. 6 Duke	14	–	4	.778	30	–	6	.833
North Carolina	12	–	6	.667	25	–	11	.694
Virginia	11	–	7	.611	23	–	12	.657
NC State	11	–	7	.611	24	–	11	.686
Florida State	9	–	9	.500	18	–	16	.529
Maryland	8	–	10	.444	25	–	13	.658
Boston College	7	–	11	.389	16	–	17	.485
Georgia Tech	6	–	12	.333	16	–	15	.516
Wake Forest	6	–	12	.333	13	–	18	.419
Clemson	5	–	13	.278	13	–	18	.419
Virginia Tech	4	–	14	.222	13	–	19	.406
† 2013 ACC tournament winner As of April 2, 2013; Rankings from AP Poll

The 2012–13 Wake Forest Demon Deacons men's basketball team represented Wake Forest University during the 2012–13 NCAA Division I men's basketball season. Their head coach was Jeff Bzdelik, who was coaching in his third season at Wake Forest. The team played its home games at the Lawrence Joel Veterans Memorial Coliseum in Winston-Salem, North Carolina, and was a member of the Atlantic Coast Conference. They finished the season 13–18, 6–12 in ACC play to finish in a tie for ninth place. They lost in the first round of the ACC tournament to Maryland.

== Previous season ==
Wake finished the 2011–12 season 13–18, 4–12 in ACC play tied for 9th place and lost in the first round of the ACC tournament. The end of the season was highlighted by the sudden outgoing transfer of 3 players off the Wake Forest Men's Basketball team following Athletic Director Ron Wellman's announcement that Head Coach Jeff Bzdelik would be returning for another season.

== Recruiting ==
Wake Forest has a 7-man recruiting class for 2012.

College recruiting
Name	Hometown	School	Height	Weight	Commit date
Tyler Cavanaugh; Forward	Dewitt, New York	Jamesville-Dewitt HS	6 ft 9 in (2.06 m)	230 lb (100 kg)	Sep 24, 2011
Tyler Cavanaugh; Forward	Recruit ratings: Scout: Rivals: (89)				
Madison Jones; Guard	Raleigh, North Carolina	Ravenscroft School	6 ft 1 in (1.85 m)	160 lb (73 kg)	Apr 6, 2012
Madison Jones; Guard	Recruit ratings: Scout: Rivals: (88)				
Codi Miller-McIntyre; Guard	Concord, North Carolina	First Assembly Christian School	6 ft 3 in (1.91 m)	195 lb (88 kg)	Mar 3, 2011
Codi Miller-McIntyre; Guard	Recruit ratings: Scout: Rivals: (92)				
Arnaud Moto; Forward	Alexandria, Virginia	Episcopal HS	6 ft 6 in (1.98 m)	225 lb (102 kg)	Oct 1, 2011
Arnaud Moto; Forward	Recruit ratings: Scout: Rivals: (92)				
Aaron Rountree; Forward	Wilson, North Carolina	Greenfield School	6 ft 8 in (2.03 m)	190 lb (86 kg)	Mar 6, 2011
Aaron Rountree; Forward	Recruit ratings: Scout: Rivals: (89)				
Devin Thomas; Forward	Harrisburg, Pennsylvania	Central Dauphin SHS	6 ft 9 in (2.06 m)	240 lb (110 kg)	Sep 3, 2011
Devin Thomas; Forward	Recruit ratings: Scout: Rivals: (89)				
Andre Washington; Center	Roanoke, Virginia	Roanoke Catholic School	7 ft 0 in (2.13 m)	220 lb (100 kg)	Mar 23, 2011
Andre Washington; Center	Recruit ratings: Scout: Rivals: (86)				
Overall recruit ranking:
Note: In many cases, Scout, Rivals, 247Sports, On3, and ESPN may conflict in their listings of height and weight.; In these cases, the average was taken. ESPN grades are on a 100-point scale.; Sources: "2012 Team Ranking". Rivals.

== Roster ==
2012–13 Wake Forest Demon Deacons men's basketball team
Players
Coaches

Pos.	#	Name	Height	Weight	Year	Previous school	Hometown
G	0	Codi Miller-McIntyre	6 ft 3 in (1.91 m)	195 lb (88 kg)	Fr	Hargrave Military Acad.	Concord, NC
G	1	Madison Jones	6 ft 1 in (1.85 m)	160 lb (73 kg)	Fr	Ravencroft School	Raleigh, NC
F	2	Devin Thomas	6 ft 9 in (2.06 m)	240 lb (109 kg)	Fr	Central Dauphin HS	Harrisburg, PA
F	4	Daniel Green	6 ft 10 in (2.08 m)	220 lb (100 kg)	So	Grapevine HS	Colleyville, TX
G	10	Chase Fischer	6 ft 3 in (1.91 m)	195 lb (88 kg)	So	Ripley HS	Ripley, WV
G	11	C. J. Harris	6 ft 3 in (1.91 m)	190 lb (86 kg)	Sr	Mount Tabor HS	Winston-Salem, NC
F	30	Travis McKie	6 ft 7 in (2.01 m)	220 lb (100 kg)	Jr	John Marshall HS	Richmond, VA
C	31	Andre Washington	7 ft 0 in (2.13 m)	220 lb (100 kg)	Fr	Hargrave Military Acad.	Roanoke, VA
F	33	Aaron Rountree III	6 ft 8 in (2.03 m)	190 lb (86 kg)	Fr	Greenfield School	Wilson, NC
F	34	Tyler Cavanaugh	6 ft 9 in (2.06 m)	230 lb (104 kg)	Fr	Jamesville-Dewitt HS	Dewitt, NY
G	42	Spencer Jennings	6 ft 1 in (1.85 m)	180 lb (82 kg)	Sr	Herbert Henry Dow HS	Midland, MI
F	45	Arnaud William Adala Moto	6 ft 6 in (1.98 m)	225 lb (102 kg)	Fr	Episcopal HS	Yaoundé, Cameroon
F	52	Doug Niedrich	6 ft 6 in (1.98 m)	200 lb (91 kg)	So	Adlai E. Stevenson HS	Kildeer, IL

Head coach

- Jeff Bzdelik (Illinois-Chicago)

Assistant coach(es)

- Jeff Battle (Marshall)
- Rusty LaRue (Wake Forest)
- Walt Corbean (Xavier)

Legend

- (C) Team captain
- (S) Suspended
- (I) Ineligible
- (W) Walk-on
- Injured
- Current redshirt

Roster
Last update: 2012-10-19

== Schedule ==
Date time, TV	Rank^{#}	Opponent^{#}	Result	Record	Site city, state
Exhibition
October 19*; 7:00 p.m.		at Brock	W 84–79		Davis Gymnasium; St. Catharines, Ontario
October 20*; 7:00 p.m.		at Ryerson	W 88–80		Mattamy Athletic Centre; Toronto, Ontario
November 2*; 7:00 p.m.		Rollins	W 73–66		LJVM Coliseum; Winston-Salem, North Carolina
Regular season
November 9*; 7:00 p.m., ESPN3		Radford	W 79–67	1–0	LJVM Coliseum; Winston-Salem, North Carolina
November 16*; 6:30 p.m., CBSSN		vs. No. 23 Connecticut; Paradise Jam Tournament Quarterfinal	L 71–77	1–1	Sports and Fitness Center; Saint Thomas, U.S. Virgin Islands
November 17*; 5:00 p.m.		vs. Iona; Paradise Jam Tournament Consolation	L 68–94	1–2	Sports and Fitness Center; Saint Thomas, U.S. Virgin Islands
November 19*; 2:30 p.m.		vs. Mercer; Paradise Jam Tournament Seventh Place Game	W 74–71	2–2	Sports and Fitness Center; Saint Thomas, U.S. Virgin Islands
November 23*; 7:00 p.m., ESPN3		William & Mary	W 63–57	3–2	LJVM Coliseum; Winston-Salem, North Carolina
November 27*; 9:15 p.m., ESPNU		Nebraska; ACC–Big Ten Challenge	L 63–79	3–3	LJVM Coliseum; Winston-Salem, North Carolina
December 1*; 6:00 p.m.		at Richmond	L 60–62	3–4	Robins Center; Richmond, Virginia
December 5*; 7:00 p.m., ESPN3		High Point	W 71–60	4–4	LJVM Coliseum; Winston-Salem, North Carolina
December 8*; 7:00 p.m., ESPN3		Seton Hall	L 67–71	4–5	LJVM Coliseum; Winston-Salem, North Carolina
December 18*; 7:00 p.m., ESPN3		Furman	W 79–55	5–5	LJVM Coliseum; Winston-Salem, North Carolina
December 22*; 2:30 p.m., ESPN3		at UNC Greensboro	W 84–70	6–5	Greensboro Coliseum; Greensboro, North Carolina
January 2*; 7:00 p.m., ESPN3		Xavier	W 66–59	7–5	LJVM Coliseum; Winston-Salem, North Carolina
January 5; 12:00 p.m., ESPNU		at No. 1 Duke	L 62–80	7–6 (0–1)	Cameron Indoor Stadium; Durham, North Carolina
January 9; 9:00 p.m., RSN/ESPN3		Virginia	W 55–52	8–6 (1–1)	LJVM Coliseum; Winston-Salem, North Carolina
January 12; 4:00 p.m., RSN/ESPN3		Boston College	W 75–72	9–6 (2–1)	LJVM Coliseum; Winston-Salem, North Carolina
January 15; 7:00 p.m., ESPNU		at Clemson	L 44–60	9–7 (2–2)	Littlejohn Coliseum; Clemson, South Carolina
January 19; 2:00 p.m., ACCN/ESPN3		at Virginia Tech	L 65–66	9–8 (2–3)	Cassell Coliseum; Blacksburg, Virginia
January 22; 7:00 p.m., RSN/ESPN3		No. 18 NC State	W 86–84	10–8 (3–3)	LJVM Coliseum; Winston-Salem, North Carolina
January 26; 3:00 p.m., ACCN/ESPN3		at Georgia Tech	L 62–82	10–9 (3–4)	Hank McCamish Pavilion; Atlanta, Georgia
January 30; 8:00 p.m., ACCN/ESPN3		No. 5 Duke	L 70–75	10–10 (3–5)	LJVM Coliseum; Winston-Salem, North Carolina
February 2; 2:00 p.m., RSN/ESPN3		at Maryland	L 60–86	10–11 (3–6)	Comcast Center; College Park, Maryland
February 5; 7:00 p.m., ESPNU		at North Carolina	L 62–87	10–12 (3–7)	Dean Smith Center; Chapel Hill, North Carolina
February 9; 12:00 p.m., ESPN2		Florida State	W 71–46	11–12 (4–7)	LJVM Coliseum; Winston-Salem, North Carolina
February 13; 7:00 p.m., RSN/ESPN3		at Boston College	L 63–66	11–13 (4–8)	Conte Forum; Chestnut Hill, Massachusetts
February 16; 2:00 p.m., RSN/ESPN3		Georgia Tech	L 56–57	11–14 (4–9)	LJVM Coliseum; Winston-Salem, North Carolina
February 23; 1:00 p.m., RSN/ESPN3		No. 2 Miami (FL)	W 80–65	12–14 (5–9)	LJVM Coliseum; Winston-Salem, North Carolina
February 26; 9:00 p.m., ESPNU		at Florida State	L 62–76	12–15 (5–10)	Donald L. Tucker Center; Tallahassee, Florida
March 2; 12:00 p.m., ACCN/ESPN3		Maryland	L 57–67	12–16 (5–11)	LJVM Coliseum; Winston-Salem, North Carolina
March 6; 9:00 p.m., ACCN/ESPN3		at NC State	L 66–81	12–17 (5–12)	PNC Arena; Raleigh, North Carolina
March 10; 2:00 p.m., ACCN/ESPN3		Virginia Tech	W 90–79	13–17 (6–12)	LJVM Coliseum; Winston-Salem, North Carolina
ACC tournament
March 14; 7:00 p.m., ESPNU/ACC Network		vs. Maryland; First Round	L 62–75	13–18	Greensboro Coliseum; Greensboro, North Carolina
*Non-conference game. ^{#}Rankings from Coaches' Poll. (#) Tournament seedings in parentheses. All times are in Eastern Time.

== Leaders by Game ==
- Team Season Highs in **Bold**.

Game	Points	Rebounds	Assists	Steals	Blocks
Radford	Harris (19)	McKie (9)	Harris/Miller-McIntyre (3)	Adala Moto (3)	Adala Moto/Jones (2)
Connecticut	Miller-McIntyre (21)	McKie (8)	Miller-McIntyre (4)	4 tied (1)	Thomas (2)
Iona	McKie (13)	McKie/Thomas (7)	Fischer (3)	Jones (3)	Fischer/Jones (1)
Mercer	McKie (23)	**McKie (15)**	Miller-McIntyre (3)	McKie/Thomas (3)	Thomas (2)
William & Mary	Harris (18)	Rountree (7)	3 tied (2)	Rountree (2)	**Rountree (5)**
Nebraska	Jones (14)	McKie (7)	Miller-McIntyre (3)	Jones (2)	Rountree (3)
Richmond	Thomas (11)	McKie (8)	Harris (3)	Jones/Rountree (2)	Rountree (3)
High Point	Fischer (15)	McKie (10)	Jones/Miller-McIntyre (3)	Rountree (3)	McKie/Rountree (2)
Seton Hall	Harris (28)	McKie (7)	Miller-McIntyre (5)	**McKie (4)**	Thomas (4)
Furman	Harris (20)	Thomas (7)	Harris (5)	Jones (3)	Thomas (2)
UNC Greensboro	McKie (19)	Moto/Thomas (6)	Miller-McIntyre (5)	Rountree (3)	Jones (2)
Xavier	McKie (19)	Thomas (14)	Miller-McIntyre (3)	McKie/Thomas (2)	McKie (2)
Duke	McKie (22)	McKie/Thomas (12)	Harris (5)	McKie (2)	McKie (1)
Virginia	Harris (16)	Thomas (8)	McKie (3)	McKie (2)	Thomas (3)
Boston College	**Harris (29)**	Thomas (11)	Miller-McIntyre (5)	**McKie/Rountree (4)**	Thomas (2)
Clemson	McKie (12)	McKie (11)	3 tied (1)	Adala Moto (2)	McKie/Thomas (1)
Virginia Tech	McKie (20)	**McKie (15)**	Harris/Miller-McIntyre (4)	4 tied (1)	McKie (1)
NC State	Thomas (25)	Thomas (14)	Thomas (4)	Thomas (3)	Thomas (4)
Georgia Tech	Harris (18)	Thomas (13)	Harris/Miller-McIntyre (3)	Jones (2)	**Thomas (5)**
Duke	Thomas (15)	McKie (7)	Jones (5)	Jones (2)	McKie (2)
Maryland	McKie (15)	McKie (6)	Jones (4)	Harris (3)	
North Carolina	Harris (12)	Thomas (13)	Jones (5)	Miller-McIntyre (2)	Rountree/Thomas (1)
Florida State	McKie (15)	Thomas (8)	Jones/Thomas (3)	**Thomas (4)**	Rountree/Thomas (2)
Boston College	Harris (23)	Thomas (9)	Harris/Miller-McIntyre (4)	5 tied (1)	Thomas (2)
Georgia Tech	Harris/McKie (15)	Thomas (12)	Miller-McIntyre (3)	Rountree (2)	Rountree (4)
Miami	Harris (23)	McKie (10)	Jones/Miller-McIntyre (3)	**Jones (4)**	**McKie (5)**
Florida State	McKie (15)	McKie (6)	Adala Moto/Jones (2)	Rountree (2)	McKie (2)
Maryland	Harris (19)	Thomas (7)	Harris/Miller-McIntyre (3)	Thomas (3)	McKie (2)
NC State	Thomas (13)	Thomas (11)	**Jones (6)**	Jones (2)	Thomas (2)
Virginia Tech	**Harris (29)**	Thomas (8)	3 tied (4)	McKie/Thomas (2)	3 tied (1)
