= Orlando Early =

American men's college basketball coach

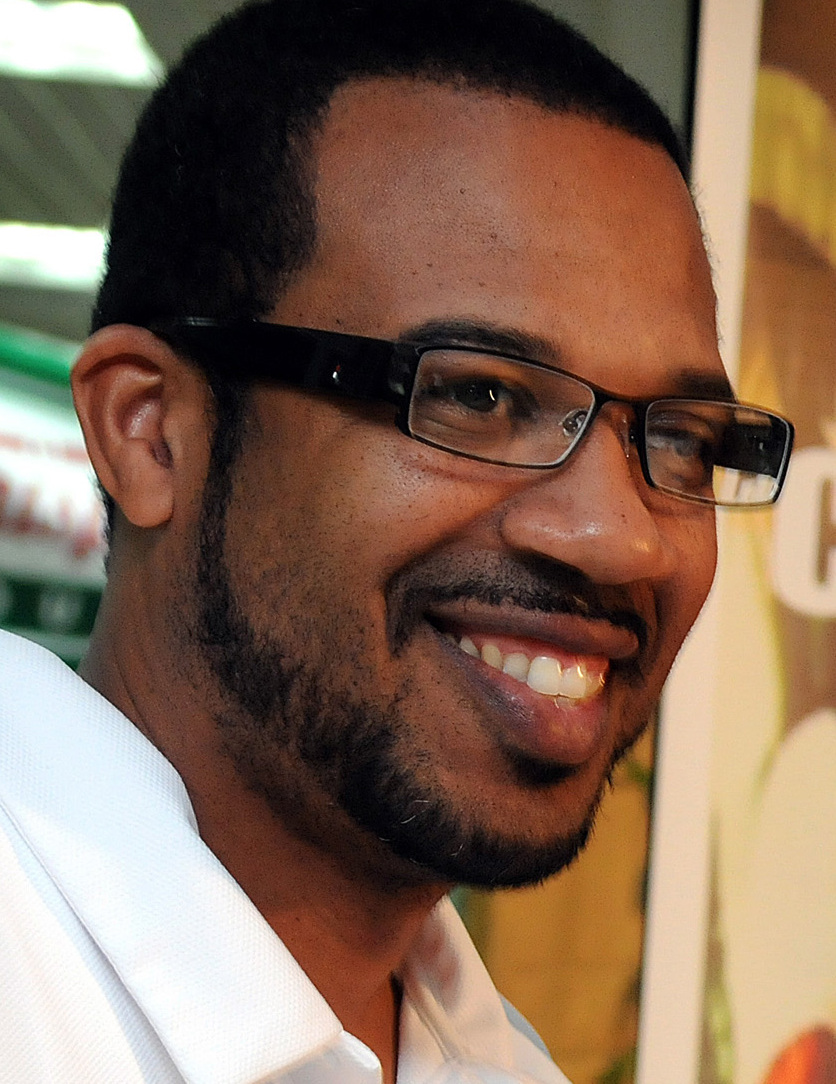
- Early in 2009

Biographical details
- Born: November 27, 1967 (age 58); Lebanon, Virginia, U.S.

Playing career
- 1986–1990: Gardner-Webb

Coaching career (HC unless noted)
- 1993–1995: Gardner-Webb (assistant)
- 1995–1998: Western Carolina (assistant)
- 1998–2001: Charlotte (assistant)
- 2001–2005: Alabama (assistant)
- 2005–2010: Louisiana–Monroe
- 2010–2011: South Carolina (assistant)
- 2011–2017: NC State (assistant)

Head coaching record
- Overall: 60–92 (.395)

Accomplishments and honors

Championships
- Sun Belt West Division (2007)

Awards
- Sun Belt Coach of the Year (2007)

Orlando Early (born November 27, 1967) is an American men's college basketball coach. He was most recently an assistant coach at North Carolina State University under head coach Mark Gottfried until Gottfried was let go at the end of the 2016–17 season.

From 2005 to 2010, he served as head men's basketball coach at the University of Louisiana at Monroe. Early has also served as an assistant men's basketball coach at the University of South Carolina and the University of Alabama.

== Head coaching record ==
Record table
Season	Team	Overall	Conference	Standing	Postseason
Louisiana–Monroe Warhawks (Southland Conference) (2005–2006)
2005–06	Louisiana–Monroe	10–18	6–10	T–8th	
Louisiana–Monroe Warhawks (Sun Belt Conference) (2006–2010)
2006–07	Louisiana–Monroe	18–14	11–7	T–1st (West)	
2007–08	Louisiana–Monroe	10–21	4–14	7th (West)	
2008–09	Louisiana–Monroe	10–20	6–12	T–5th (West)	
2009–10	Louisiana–Monroe	12–19	6–12	T–5th (West)	
Louisiana–Monroe:		60–92 (.395)	33–55 (.375)		
Total:		60–92 (.395)			
National champion Postseason invitational champion Conference regular season champion Conference regular season and conference tournament champion Division regular season champion Division regular season and conference tournament champion Conference tournament champion
