= 2012–13 Virginia Cavaliers men's basketball team =

American college basketball season

2012–13 Virginia Cavaliers men's basketball

NIT, Quarterfinals
- Conference: Atlantic Coast Conference
- Record: 23–12 (11–7 ACC)
- Head coach: Tony Bennett (4th season)
- Associate head coach: Ritchie McKay (4th season)
- Assistant coaches: Ron Sanchez (4th season); Jason Williford (4th season)
- Home arena: John Paul Jones Arena

2012–13 ACC men's basketball standings
| | Conf. | | | | Overall |
| Team | W | | L | PCT | W | | L | PCT |
|---|---|---|---|---|---|---|---|---|
| No. 5 Miami (FL) † | 15 | – | 3 | .833 | 29 | – | 7 | .806 |
| No. 6 Duke | 14 | – | 4 | .778 | 30 | – | 6 | .833 |
| North Carolina | 12 | – | 6 | .667 | 25 | – | 11 | .694 |
| Virginia | 11 | – | 7 | .611 | 23 | – | 12 | .657 |
| NC State | 11 | – | 7 | .611 | 24 | – | 11 | .686 |
| Florida State | 9 | – | 9 | .500 | 18 | – | 16 | .529 |
| Maryland | 8 | – | 10 | .444 | 25 | – | 13 | .658 |
| Boston College | 7 | – | 11 | .389 | 16 | – | 17 | .485 |
| Georgia Tech | 6 | – | 12 | .333 | 16 | – | 15 | .516 |
| Wake Forest | 6 | – | 12 | .333 | 13 | – | 18 | .419 |
| Clemson | 5 | – | 13 | .278 | 13 | – | 18 | .419 |
| Virginia Tech | 4 | – | 14 | .222 | 13 | – | 19 | .406 |
† 2013 ACC tournament winner As of April 2, 2013; Rankings from AP Poll

The 2012–13 Virginia Cavaliers men's basketball team represented the University of Virginia during the 2012–13 NCAA Division I men's basketball season. The Cavaliers, led by fourth-year head coach Tony Bennett, played their home games at John Paul Jones Arena and were members of the Atlantic Coast Conference. They finished the season 23–12, 11–7 in ACC play to finish in a tie for fourth place. They lost in the quarterfinals of the ACC tournament to NC State. They received an invitation to the 2013 NIT, where they defeated Norfolk State and St. John's to advance to the quarterfinals, where they lost to Iowa. The 2012–2013 Cavaliers set a school record with 18 regular season home wins, finishing with an overall home record of 20–2 and a perfect 9–0 in ACC play.

== Previous season ==
The Cavaliers finished the 2011–12 season with a record 22–10 overall, 9–7 in ACC play and lost in the quarterfinals of the ACC tournament to NC State. They were invited to the 2012 NCAA Division I men's basketball tournament, where they lost in the second round to Florida.

== Roster ==
2012–13 Virginia Cavaliers men's basketball team
Players
Coaches

| Pos. | # | Name | Height | Weight | Year | Previous school | Hometown |
|---|---|---|---|---|---|---|---|
| G | 0 | Doug Browman | 5 ft 11 in (1.8 m) | 176 lb (80 kg) | Sr | Montrose Christian | Midlothian, VA |
| G | 1 | Jontel Evans (C) | 5 ft 11 in (1.8 m) | 188 lb (85 kg) | Sr | Bethel | Hampton, VA |
| G | 2 | Paul Jesperson | 6 ft 6 in (1.98 m) | 197 lb (89 kg) | So | Merrill | Merrill, WI |
| G | 4 | Taylor Barnette | 6 ft 3 in (1.91 m) | 172 lb (78 kg) | Fr | Lexington Christian | Lexington, KY |
| G | 5 | Teven Jones | 6 ft 0 in (1.83 m) | 180 lb (82 kg) | RS Fr | Fishburne Military | Kannapolis, NC |
| F/C | 10 | Mike Tobey | 6 ft 11 in (2.11 m) | 227 lb (103 kg) | Fr | Blair Academy | Monroe, NY |
| F | 11 | Evan Nolte | 6 ft 8 in (2.03 m) | 207 lb (94 kg) | Fr | Milton | Milton, GA |
| G | 12 | Joe Harris (C) | 6 ft 6 in (1.98 m) | 211 lb (96 kg) | Jr | Chelan | Chelan, WA |
| F | 13 | Anthony Gill (redshirt) | 6 ft 8 in (2.03 m) | 229 lb (104 kg) | So | Charlotte Christian/South Carolina | Charlotte, NC |
| G | 21 | Justin Miller (W) | 6 ft 1 in (1.85 m) | 175 lb (79 kg) | Fr | Rock Bridge | Columbia, MO |
| G | 22 | Malcolm Brogdon (redshirt) | 6 ft 5 in (1.96 m) | 215 lb (98 kg) | So | Greater Atlanta Christian | Norcross, GA |
| G | 23 | Justin Anderson | 6 ft 6 in (1.98 m) | 226 lb (103 kg) | Fr | Montrose Christian | Montross, VA |
| G | 24 | Caid Kirven (W) | 6 ft 8 in (2.03 m) | 217 lb (98 kg) | Fr | Woodberry Forest | Raleigh, NC |
| G | 25 | Akil Mitchell | 6 ft 8 in (2.03 m) | 234 lb (106 kg) | Jr | Charlotte Christian | Charlotte, NC |
| G | 30 | Thomas Rogers (W) | 6 ft 6 in (1.98 m) | 209 lb (95 kg) | Jr | Fork Union Military | Farmville, VA |
| G | 32 | Darion Atkins | 6 ft 8 in (2.03 m) | 222 lb (101 kg) | So | Landon School | Clinton, MD |

Head coach

- Tony Bennett (Green Bay)

Assistant coach(es)

- Ritchie McKay (Seattle Pacific)
- Ron Sanchez (SUNY-Oneonta)
- Jason Williford (Virginia)

Strength and conditioning coach(es)

- Mike Curtis (Virginia)

Athletic trainer(s)

- Ethan Saliba (Kansas)

Legend

- (C) Team captain
- (S) Suspended
- (I) Ineligible
- (W) Walk-on
- Injured
- Current redshirt

Roster
Last update: 13 October 2014

== Schedule ==
| Date time, TV | Rank^{#} | Opponent^{#} | Result | Record | Site (attendance) city, state |
Non-conference regular season
| Nov. 9*; 7:00 pm | | at George Mason | L 59–63 | 0–1 | Patriot Center (9,840); Fairfax, VA |
| Nov. 12*; 7:00 pm, ESPN3 | | Fairfield; NIT Season Tip-Off | W 54–45 | 1–1 | John Paul Jones Arena (8,568); Charlottesville, VA |
| Nov. 13*; 7:00 pm, ESPN3 | | Delaware; NIT Season Tip-Off | L 53–59 | 1–2 | John Paul Jones Arena (8,490); Charlottesville, VA |
| Nov. 17*; 4:00 pm, ESPN3 | | Seattle | W 83–43 | 2–2 | John Paul Jones Arena (9,160); Charlottesville, VA |
| Nov. 19*; 7:00 pm | | Lamar; NIT Season Tip-Off | W 63–44 | 3–2 | John Paul Jones Arena (1,444); Charlottesville, VA |
| Nov. 20*; 7:00 pm | | North Texas; NIT Season Tip-Off | W 80–64 | 4–2 | John Paul Jones Arena (1,745); Charlottesville, VA |
| Nov. 28*; 7:00 pm, ESPN2 | | at Wisconsin; ACC–Big Ten Challenge | W 60–54 | 5–2 | Kohl Center (16,690); Madison, WI |
| Dec. 1*; 4:00 pm, RSN/ESPN3 | | Green Bay | W 67–51 | 6–2 | John Paul Jones Arena (9,600); Charlottesville, VA |
| Dec. 5*; 7:00 pm, ESPN3 | | Tennessee | W 46–38 | 7–2 | John Paul Jones Arena (9,702); Charlottesville, VA |
| Dec. 8*; 4:00 pm, ESPN3 | | Mississippi Valley State | W 67–39 | 8–2 | John Paul Jones Arena (8,691); Charlottesville, VA |
| Dec. 19*; 7:00 pm, ESPN3 | | Morgan State | W 75–57 | 9–2 | John Paul Jones Arena (8,319); Charlottesville, VA |
| Dec. 22*; 5:30 pm, NBCSN | | vs. Old Dominion; Governor's Invitational | L 61–63 | 9–3 | Richmond Coliseum (6,944); Richmond, VA |
| Dec. 30*; 1:00 pm, RSN/ESPN3 | | Wofford | W 74–39 | 10–3 | John Paul Jones Arena (9,387); Charlottesville, VA |
Conference regular season
| Jan. 6; 8:00 pm, ESPNU | | North Carolina | W 61–52 | 11–3 (1–0) | John Paul Jones Arena (12,117); Charlottesville, VA |
| Jan. 9; 9:00 pm, RSN/ESPN3 | | at Wake Forest | L 52–55 | 11–4 (1–1) | LJVM Coliseum (9,217); Winston-Salem, NC |
| Jan. 12; 12:00 pm, ACCN/ESPN3 | | at Clemson | L 44–59 | 11–5 (1–2) | Littlejohn Coliseum (7,795); Clemson, SC |
| Jan. 19; 4:00 pm, ACCN/ESPN3 | | Florida State | W 56–36 | 12–5 (2–2) | John Paul Jones Arena (12,303); Charlottesville, VA |
| Jan. 24; 8:00 pm, ACCN/ESPN3 | | at Virginia Tech | W 74–58 | 13–5 (3–2) | Cassell Coliseum (7,222); Blacksburg, VA |
| Jan. 26; 1:00 pm, RSN/ESPN3 | | Boston College | W 65–51 | 14–5 (4–2) | John Paul Jones Arena (11,660); Charlottesville, VA |
| Jan. 29; 7:00 pm, ESPN2 | | No. 19 NC State | W 58–55 | 15–5 (5–2) | John Paul Jones Arena (10,977); Charlottesville, VA |
| Feb. 3; 3:00 pm, ESPNU | | at Georgia Tech | L 60–66 | 15–6 (5–3) | Alexander Memorial Coliseum (7,128); Atlanta, GA |
| Feb. 7; 7:00 pm, ESPN2 | | Clemson | W 78–41 | 16–6 (6–3) | John Paul Jones Arena (9,942); Charlottesville, VA |
| Feb. 10; 1:00 pm, ACCN/ESPN3 | | at Maryland | W 80–69 | 17–6 (7–3) | Comcast Center (16,895); College Park, MD |
| Feb. 12; 7:00 pm, ESPNU | | Virginia Tech | W 73–55 | 18–6 (8–3) | John Paul Jones Arena (11,764); Charlottesville, VA |
| Feb. 16; 12:00 pm, ACCN/ESPN3 | | at North Carolina | L 81–93 | 18–7 (8–4) | Dean Smith Center (20,616); Chapel Hill, NC |
| Feb. 19; 9:00 pm, ESPNU | | at No. 2 Miami (FL) | L 50–54 | 18–8 (8–5) | BankUnited Center (7,972); Coral Gables, FL |
| Feb. 24; 2:00 pm, ACCN/ESPN3 | | Georgia Tech | W 82–54 | 19–8 (9–5) | John Paul Jones Arena (12,232); Charlottesville, VA |
| Feb. 28; 9:00 pm, ESPN | | No. 3 Duke | W 73–68 | 20–8 (10–5) | John Paul Jones Arena (14,593); Charlottesville, VA |
| Mar. 3; 4:00 pm, ACCN/ESPN3 | | at Boston College | L 52–53 | 20–9 (10–6) | Conte Forum (5,062); Chestnut Hill, MA |
| Mar. 7; 7:00 pm, ESPN2 | | at Florida State | L 51–53 | 20–10 (10–7) | Donald L. Tucker Center (6,430); Tallahassee, FL |
| Mar. 10; 6:00 pm, ESPNU | | Maryland | W 61–58 ^{OT} | 21–10 (11–7) | John Paul Jones Arena (11,794); Charlottesville, VA |
2013 ACC Tournament
| Mar. 15; 2:41 pm, ACCN/ESPN2 | | vs. NC State; Quarterfinals | L 56–75 | 21–11 | Greensboro Coliseum (22,169); Greensboro, NC |
2013 National Invitation Tournament
| Mar. 19*; 9:00 pm, ESPNU | No. (1) | (8) Norfolk State; First Round | W 67–56 | 22–11 | John Paul Jones Arena (4,790); Charlottesville, VA |
| Mar. 24*; 11:00 am, ESPN | No. (1) | (5) St. John's; Second Round | W 68–50 | 23–11 | John Paul Jones Arena (8,457); Charlottesville, VA |
| Mar. 27*; 7:00 pm, ESPN2 | No. (1) | (3) Iowa; Quarterfinals | L 64–75 | 23–12 | John Paul Jones Arena (11,141); Charlottesville, VA |
*Non-conference game. ^{#}Rankings from AP Poll. (#) Tournament seedings in parentheses. All times are in Eastern Time. (#) during NIT is Seed within Region.

== Rankings ==
Ranking movement Legend: ██ Improvement in ranking. ██ Decrease in ranking. ██ Not ranked the previous week. RV=Others receiving votes.
| Poll | Pre | Wk 1 | Wk 2 | Wk 3 | Wk 4 | Wk 5 | Wk 6 | Wk 7 | Wk 8 | Wk 9 | Wk 10 | Wk 11 | Wk 12 | Wk 13 | Wk 14 | Wk 15 | Wk 16 | Wk 17 | Wk 18 | Wk 19 |
|---|---|---|---|---|---|---|---|---|---|---|---|---|---|---|---|---|---|---|---|---|
| AP | NR | NR | NR | NR | NR | NR | NR | NR | NR | NR | NR | NR | NR | RV | RV | NR | NR | NR | NR | |
| Coaches | NR | NR | NR | NR | NR | NR | NR | NR | NR | RV | NR | NR | NR | NR | RV | NR | NR | RV | NR | NR |

== Team players drafted into the NBA ==
| Year | Round | Pick | Player | NBA club |
| 2014 | 2 | 33 | Joe Harris | Cleveland Cavaliers |
| 2015 | 1 | 21 | Justin Anderson | Dallas Mavericks |
| 2016 | 2 | 36 | Malcolm Brogdon | Milwaukee Bucks |
