= 2012–13 Bethune–Cookman Wildcats men's basketball team =

American college basketball season

2012–13 Bethune–Cookman Wildcats men's basketball
- Conference: Mid-Eastern Athletic Conference
- Record: 14–20 (7–9 MEAC)
- Head coach: Gravelle Craig (2nd season)
- Assistant coaches: Stacey Beckton; Montez Robinson; Rodney Martin
- Home arena: Moore Gymnasium

2012–13 MEAC men's basketball standings
	Conf.				Overall
Team	W		L	PCT	W		L	PCT
Norfolk State	16	–	0	1.000	21	–	12	.636
North Carolina Central	15	–	1	.938	22	–	9	.710
Savannah State	11	–	5	.688	19	–	15	.559
Hampton	11	–	5	.688	14	–	17	.452
Morgan State	10	–	6	.625	17	–	15	.531
North Carolina A&T †	8	–	8	.500	20	–	17	.541
Delaware State	8	–	8	.500	15	–	18	.455
Bethune–Cookman	7	–	9	.438	14	–	20	.412
Florida A&M	5	–	11	.313	8	–	23	.258
Coppin State	5	–	11	.313	8	–	24	.250
Howard	4	–	12	.250	7	–	24	.226
South Carolina State	2	–	14	.125	6	–	24	.200
Maryland Eastern Shore	2	–	14	.125	2	–	26	.071
† 2013 MEAC tournament winner As of March 21, 2013; Rankings from AP Poll

The 2012–13 Bethune–Cookman Wildcats men's basketball team represented Bethune–Cookman University during the 2012–13 NCAA Division I men's basketball season. The Wildcats, led by second year head coach Gravelle Craig, played their home games at the Moore Gymnasium and were members of the Mid-Eastern Athletic Conference. They finished the season 14–20, 7–9 in MEAC play to finish in eighth place. They advanced to the semifinals of the MEAC tournament where they lost to Morgan State.

== Roster ==
Number	Name	Position	Height	Weight	Year	Hometown
1	Adrien Coleman	Forward	6–5	190	Junior	Atlanta, Georgia
2	Alex Smith	Forward	6–7	210	Senior	Jacksonville, Florida
3	Paul Scotland	Guard	6–0	185	Senior	Manhattan, New York
4	Brandon Stewart	Guard	6–2	185	Sophomore	Miami, Florida
5	Myron Respress	Center	6–8	220	Junior	Niagara Falls, New York
10	Malik Jackson	Guard	6–6	188	Junior	Central Islip, New York
11	Javoris Bryant	Forward	6–6	200	Senior	Atlanta, Georgia
12	Mikel Trapp	Guard	6–2	195	Junior	Blair, South Carolina
15	Marc Mack	Forward	6–6	195	Sophomore	Chicago, Illinois
21	Kevin Dukes	Guard	5–9	155	Senior	Lithonia, Georgia
22	Ricky Johnson	Guard	5–9	160	Sophomore	Akron, Ohio
33	Allan Dempster	Forward	6–7	210	Freshman	Philadelphia, Pennsylvania

== Schedule ==
Date time, TV	Opponent	Result	Record	Site (attendance) city, state
Exhibition
11/06/2012*; 7:00 pm	Ave Maria	W 85–68		Moore Gymnasium (1,091); Daytona Beach, FL
Regular season
11/09/2012*; 7:05 pm	at St. Bonaventure	L 55–65	0–1	Reilly Center (4,215); St. Bonaventure, NY
11/13/2012*; 8:05 pm	at Tulane; Joe Cipriano Nebraska Classic	L 55–65	0–2	Avron B. Fogelman Arena (1,651); New Orleans, LA
11/15/2012*; 8:05 pm	at New Orleans	W 71–65	1–2	Lakefront Arena (471); New Orleans, LA
11/20/2012*; 7:00 pm	at Kent State; Joe Cipriano Nebraska Classic	L 68–69	1–3	Memorial Athletic and Convocation Center (1,958); Kent, OH
11/23/2012*; 12:00 pm	vs. Nebraska–Omaha; Joe Cipriano Nebraska Classic	W 93–81	2–3	Athletics–Recreation Center (2,477); Valparaiso, IN
11/24/2012*; 3:00 pm	at Valparaiso; Joe Cipriano Nebraska Classic	L 64–77	2–4	Athletics–Recreation Center (2,088); Valparaiso, IN
11/27/2012*; 7:00 pm	North Florida	L 65–71	2–5	Moore Gymnasium (2,817); Daytona Beach, FL
12/01/2012; 4:00 pm	at Florida A&M	L 67–75	2–6 (0–1)	Teaching Arena (857); Tallahassee, FL
12/03/2012*; 7:00 pm	Stetson	W 86–63	3–6	Moore Gymnasium (2,269); Daytona Beach, FL
12/08/2012*; 4:00 pm	Webber International	W 85–72	4–6	Moore Gymnasium (267); Daytona Beach, FL
12/12/2012*; 7:00 pm	at UCF	L 62–72	4–7	UCF Arena (3,822); Orlando, FL
12/15/2012*; 7:00 pm, ESPN3	at Pittsburgh	L 40–89	4–8	Petersen Events Center (8,115); Pittsburgh, PA
12/17/2012*; 7:00 pm	at Florida Christian	W 102–51	5–8	Moore Gymnasium (191); Daytona Beach, FL
12/21/2012*; 7:00 pm	Youngstown State	L 51–67	5–9	Moore Gymnasium (504); Daytona Beach, FL
01/05/2013*; 1:30 pm	at LSU	L 63–79	5–10	Maravich Center (6,462); Baton Rouge, LA
01/07/2013*; 1:00 pm	at FIU	L 72–74	5–11	U.S. Century Bank Arena (828); Miami, FL
01/12/2013; 4:30 pm	North Carolina A&T	W 72–60	6–11 (1–1)	Moore Gymnasium (1,901); Daytona Beach, FL
01/14/2013; 7:30 pm	North Carolina Central	L 66–75	6–12 (1–2)	Moore Gymnasium (1,801); Daytona Beach, FL
01/19/2013; 6:30 pm	at South Carolina State	W 60–52	7–12 (2–2)	SHM Memorial Center (662); Orangeburg, SC
01/21/2013; 7:30 pm, ESPNU	at Savannah State	L 40–43	7–13 (2–3)	Tiger Arena (3,852); Savannah, GA
01/26/2013; 4:00 pm	Delaware State	L 52–68	7–14 (2–4)	Moore Gymnasium (1,001); Daytona Beach, FL
01/28/2013; 7:30 pm	Maryland–Eastern Shore	W 58–57	8–14 (3–4)	Moore Gymnasium (1,751); Daytona Beach, FL
02/02/2013; 4:00 pm	Florida A&M	W 67–65 ^{OT}	9–14 (4–4)	Moore Gymnasium (1,400); Daytona Beach, FL
02/09/2013; 4:00 pm	at North Carolina A&T	L 55–65	9–15 (4–5)	Corbett Sports Center (1,557); Greensboro, NC
02/11/2013; 7:30 pm	at North Carolina Central	L 75–81	9–16 (4–6)	McLendon–McDougald Gymnasium (2,614); Durham, NC
02/18/2013; 7:30 pm	Howard	W 64–50	10–16 (5–6)	Moore Gymnasium (612); Daytona Beach, FL
02/23/2013; 4:00 pm	South Carolina State	W 85–75	11–16 (6–6)	Moore Gymnasium (1,081); Daytona Beach, FL
02/25/2013; 7:55 pm	Savannah State	W 72–58	12–16 (7–6)	Moore Gymnasium (1,561); Daytona Beach, FL
03/02/2013; 6:00 pm	at Norfolk State	L 61–62	12–17 (7–7)	Joseph G. Echols Memorial Hall (2,155); Norfolk, VA
03/04/2013; 8:00 pm	at Hampton	L 66–75	12–18 (7–8)	Hampton Convocation Center (2,154); Hampton, VA
03/07/2013; 8:00 pm	at Coppin State	L 61–69	12–19 (7–9)	Physical Education Complex (516); Baltimore, MD
2013 MEAC men's basketball tournament
03/12/2013; 4:00 pm	vs. Coppin State; First Round	W 89–78	13–19	Norfolk Scope (2,591); Norfolk, VA
03/13/2013; 6:00 pm	vs. Norfolk State; Quarterfinals	W 70–68 ^{OT}	14–19	Norfolk Scope (7,543); Norfolk, VA
03/15/2013; 6:00 pm	vs. Morgan State; Semifinals	L 71–82	14–20	Norfolk Scope (N/A); Norfolk, VA
*Non-conference game. ^{#}Rankings from AP Poll. (#) Tournament seedings in parentheses. All times are in Eastern Time.
