= 2012–13 Norfolk State Spartans men's basketball team =

American college basketball season

2012–13 Norfolk State Spartans men's basketball
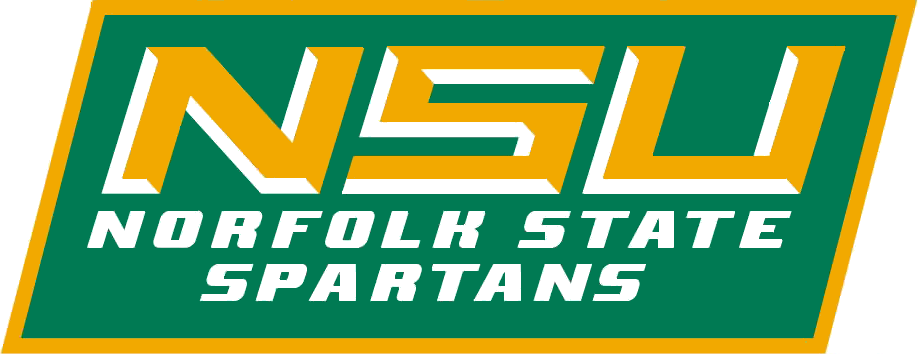

MEAC Regular Season Champions

NIT, First Round
- Conference: Mid-Eastern Athletic Conference
- Record: 21–12 (16–0 MEAC)
- Head coach: Anthony Evans (6th season)
- Assistant coaches: Robert Jones; Larry Vickers; Harold Rayford
- Home arena: Joseph G. Echols Memorial Hall

2012–13 MEAC men's basketball standings
	Conf.				Overall
Team	W		L	PCT	W		L	PCT
Norfolk State	16	–	0	1.000	21	–	12	.636
North Carolina Central	15	–	1	.938	22	–	9	.710
Savannah State	11	–	5	.688	19	–	15	.559
Hampton	11	–	5	.688	14	–	17	.452
Morgan State	10	–	6	.625	17	–	15	.531
North Carolina A&T †	8	–	8	.500	20	–	17	.541
Delaware State	8	–	8	.500	15	–	18	.455
Bethune–Cookman	7	–	9	.438	14	–	20	.412
Florida A&M	5	–	11	.313	8	–	23	.258
Coppin State	5	–	11	.313	8	–	24	.250
Howard	4	–	12	.250	7	–	24	.226
South Carolina State	2	–	14	.125	6	–	24	.200
Maryland Eastern Shore	2	–	14	.125	2	–	26	.071
† 2013 MEAC tournament winner As of March 21, 2013; Rankings from AP Poll

The 2012–13 Norfolk State Spartans men's basketball team represented Norfolk State University during the 2012–13 NCAA Division I men's basketball season. The Spartans, led by sixth year head coach Anthony Evans, played their home games at the Joseph G. Echols Memorial Hall and were members of the Mid-Eastern Athletic Conference. They finished the season 21–12, 16–0 in MEAC play be crowned MEAC regular season champions. The defending conference champion lost in the quarterfinals of the MEAC tournament to Bethune-Cookman. As a regular season champion who failed to win their conference tournament, they received an automatic bid to the 2013 NIT where they lost in the first round to Virginia.

== Roster ==
Number	Name	Position	Height	Weight	Year	Hometown
0	Kievyn Lila-St.Rose	Guard/Forward	6–6	180	Junior	Corona, New York
1	Rob Johnson	Forward	6–8	220	Senior	Roswell, Georgia
3	Jamel Fuentes	Guard	6–3	185	Junior	Brooklyn, New York
4	Marese Phelps	Guard	6–1	190	Junior	Norfolk, Virginia
11	Pendarvis Williams	Guard	6–6	195	Junior	Philadelphia, Pennsylvania
13	Quasim Pugh	Guard	6–0	175	Senior	Brooklyn, New York
21	Jordan Weathers	Guard	6–5	200	Junior	Los Angeles, California
22	Kris Brown	Guard	6–3	160	Senior	Suffolk, Virginia
23	Brandon Goode	Forward/Center	7–0	225	Junior	Bronx, New York
24	Zieyik Estime	Guard	6–6	185	Junior	Harlem, New York
25	Malcolm Hawkins	Guard	6–5	215	Junior	Norfolk, Virginia
31	Riley Maye	Forward	6–8	215	Junior	East Stroudsburg, Pennsylvania
32	Paulius Vinogradovas	Center	7–1	215	Sophomore	Švenčionėliai, Lithuania
35	Rashid Gaston	Forward	6–8	235	Freshman	Warren, Ohio
45	A.J. Rogers	Forward	6–7	200	Senior	Rosedale, New York

== Schedule ==
Date time, TV	Opponent	Result	Record	Site (attendance) city, state
Regular season
11/09/2012*; 7:30 pm	at Rhode Island; Hall of Fame Tip-Off Classic	W 67–55	1–0	Ryan Center (5,045); Kingston, RI
11/12/2012*; 7:00 pm	at Seton Hall; Hall of Fame Tip-Off Classic	L 65–78	1–1	Prudential Center (6,165); Newark, NJ
11/15/2012*; 7:00 pm	at Longwood	W 78–66	2–1	Willett Hall (1,723); Farmville, VA
11/17/2012*; 12:00 pm	vs. Loyola (MD); Hall of Fame Tip-Off Classic	L 49–65	2–2	Mohegan Sun Arena (N/A); Uncasville, CT
11/18/2012*; 11:30 am	vs. UMKC; Hall of Fame Tip-Off Classic	L 57–63	2–3	Mohegan Sun Arena (N/A); Uncasville, CT
11/24/2012*; 7:00 pm	at Eastern Kentucky	L 44–68	2–4	Alumni Coliseum (1,225); Richmond, KY
11/26/2012*; 7:00 pm	at Morehead State	L 67–73	2–5	Ellis Johnson Arena (2,375); Morehead, KY
11/29/2012*; 7:00 pm	St. Francis (NY)	W 85–79	3–5	Joseph G. Echols Memorial Hall (3,376); Norfolk, VA
12/01/2012; 6:00 pm	at Savannah State	W 55–45	4–5 (1–0)	Tiger Arena (1,410); Savannah, GA
12/03/2012; 7:30 pm	at South Carolina State	W 78–72	5–5 (2–0)	SHM Memorial Center (1,047); Orangeburg, SC
12/09/2012*; 4:00 pm	UMBC	W 83–66	6–5	Joseph G. Echols Memorial Hall (1,174); Norfolk, VA
12/12/2012*; 8:00 pm, ESPN3	at No. 10 Illinois	L 54–64	6–6	Assembly Hall (14,144); Champaign, IL
12/15/2012*; 7:00 pm, ESPN3	at No. 25 NC State	L 62–84	6–7	PNC Arena (12,384); Raleigh, NC
12/23/2012*; 2:00 pm	at Iona	L 72–100	6–8	Hynes Athletic Center (1,855); New Rochelle, NY
12/29/2012*; 5:30 pm	at East Carolina	L 63–74	6–9	Williams Arena (5,172); Greenville, NC
01/02/2013*; 7:00 pm	at Ball State	L 61–62	6–10	John E. Worthen Arena (2,633); Muncie, IN
01/05/2013*; 5:00 pm	Navy	W 74–68	7–10	Joseph G. Echols Memorial Hall (2,411); Norfolk, VA
01/12/2013; 4:40 pm	at Maryland–Eastern Shore	W 63–58	8–10 (3–0)	Hytche Athletic Center (2,316); Princess Anne, MD
01/14/2013; 7:00 pm, ESPNU	at Howard	W 54–49	9–10 (4–0)	Burr Gymnasium (1,024); Washington, D.C.
01/19/2013; 6:30 pm	Coppin State	W 75–68	10–10 (5–0)	Joseph G. Echols Memorial Hall (4,011); Norfolk, VA
01/21/2013; 8:00 pm	Morgan State	W 73–71	11–10 (6–0)	Joseph G. Echols Memorial Hall (2,586); Norfolk, VA
01/26/2013; 6:00 pm	Hampton	W 74–67	12–10 (7–0)	Joseph G. Echols Memorial Hall (6,191); Norfolk, VA
02/02/2013; 4:00 pm	at Coppin State	W 80–70	13–10 (8–0)	Physical Education Complex (3,342); Baltimore, MD
02/04/2013; 7:30 pm	at Morgan State	W 64–59	14–10 (9–0)	Talmadge L. Hill Field House (3,012); Baltimore, MD
02/09/2013; 6:00 pm	Delaware State	W 74–56	15–10 (10–0)	Joseph G. Echols Memorial Hall (3,847); Norfolk, VA
02/11/2013; 8:20 pm	Maryland–Eastern Shore	W 85–63	16–10 (11–0)	Joseph G. Echols Memorial Hall (2,579); Norfolk, VA
02/18/2013; 7:00 pm, ESPNU	at Hampton	W 62–59	17–10 (12–0)	Hampton Convocation Center (6,387); Hampton, VA
02/23/2013; 4:00 pm	at Delaware State	W 60–56	18–10 (13–0)	Memorial Hall (1,843); Dover, DE
03/02/2013; 6:00 pm	Bethune-Cookman	W 62–61	19–10 (14–0)	Joseph G. Echols Memorial Hall (2,155); Norfolk, VA
03/04/2013; 8:00 pm	Florida A&M	W 69–58	20–10 (15–0)	Joseph G. Echols Memorial Hall (1,140); Norfolk, VA
03/07/2013; 8:00 pm	North Carolina A&T	W 55–48	21–10 (16–0)	Joseph G. Echols Memorial Hall (2,794); Norfolk, VA
2013 MEAC men's basketball tournament
03/13/2013; 6:00 pm	vs. Bethune-Cookman; Quarterfinals	L 68–70 ^{OT}	21–11	Norfolk Scope (7,543); Norfolk, VA
2013 NIT
03/19/2013*; 9:00 pm, ESPNU	at Virginia; First Round	L 56–67	21–12	John Paul Jones Arena (4,790); Charlottesville, VA
*Non-conference game. ^{#}Rankings from AP Poll. (#) Tournament seedings in parentheses. All times are in Eastern Time.
