= 2012–13 Howard Bison men's basketball team =

American college basketball season

2012–13 Howard Bison men's basketball
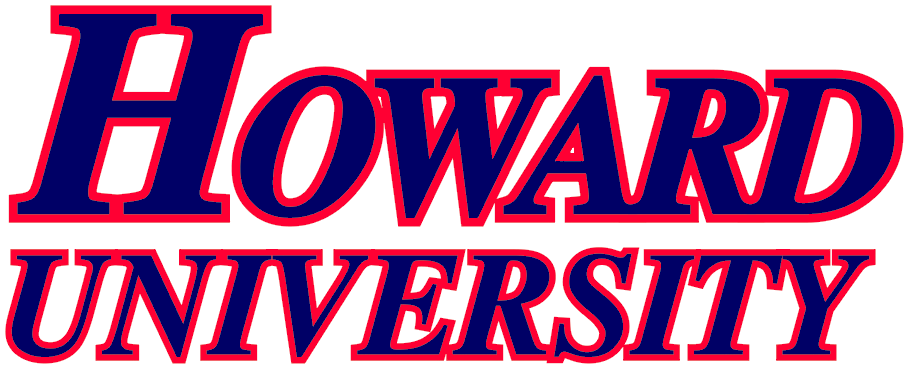
- Conference: Mid-Eastern Athletic Conference
- Record: 7–24 (4–12 MEAC)
- Head coach: Kevin Nickelberry (3rd season)
- Home arena: Burr Gymnasium

2012–13 MEAC men's basketball standings
	Conf.				Overall
Team	W		L	PCT	W		L	PCT
Norfolk State	16	–	0	1.000	21	–	12	.636
North Carolina Central	15	–	1	.938	22	–	9	.710
Savannah State	11	–	5	.688	19	–	15	.559
Hampton	11	–	5	.688	14	–	17	.452
Morgan State	10	–	6	.625	17	–	15	.531
North Carolina A&T †	8	–	8	.500	20	–	17	.541
Delaware State	8	–	8	.500	15	–	18	.455
Bethune–Cookman	7	–	9	.438	14	–	20	.412
Florida A&M	5	–	11	.313	8	–	23	.258
Coppin State	5	–	11	.313	8	–	24	.250
Howard	4	–	12	.250	7	–	24	.226
South Carolina State	2	–	14	.125	6	–	24	.200
Maryland Eastern Shore	2	–	14	.125	2	–	26	.071
† 2013 MEAC tournament winner As of March 21, 2013; Rankings from AP Poll

The 2012–13 Howard Bison basketball team represented Howard University during the 2012–13 NCAA Division I men's basketball season. The Bison, led by third year head coach Kevin Nickelberry, played their home games at the Burr Gymnasium and were members of the Mid-Eastern Athletic Conference. They finished the season 7–24, 4–12 in MEAC play to finish in eleventh place. They lost in the first round of the MEAC tournament to Delaware State.

== Roster ==
Number	Name	Position	Height	Weight	Year	Hometown
0	Emmanuel Okoro II	Forward	6–6	220	Sophomore	Houston, Texas
1	Tre Lee	Guard	6–3	190	Junior	Hampton, Virginia
2	Calvin Thompson	Guard	6–3	170	Senior	New Orleans, Louisiana
3	Prince Okoroh	Guard/forward	6–5	190	Sophomore	Greenbelt, Maryland
4	Anton Dickerson	Guard	6–2	175	Senior	Brooklyn, New York
5	Simuel Frazier	Guard	5–11	175	Sophomore	Norfolk, Virginia
13	Mike Phillips	Forward	6–7	185	Senior	Fredericksburg, Virginia
15	Brandon Bailey	Forward	6–6	190	Sophomore	Largo, Maryland
21	Dadrian Collins	Forward	6–6	220	Senior	Williamsburg, Virginia
22	Brandon Ford	Guard	6–3	190	Sophomore	Largo, Maryland
25	Theodore Boyomo	Center	6–9	220	Sophomore	Cameroon
32	Alphonso Leary	Center	6–10	200	Junior	Norfolk, Virginia
44	Oliver Ellison	Center	6–8	190	Sophomore	Washington, D.C.

== Schedule ==
Date time, TV	Opponent	Result	Record	Site (attendance) city, state
Regular season
11/10/2012*; 4:00 pm	Lincoln (PA)	L 62–68	0–1	Burr Gymnasium (N/A); Washington, D.C.
11/15/2012*; 8:00 pm, BTN2	at Iowa; Cancún Challenge	L 36–66	0–2	Carver–Hawkeye Arena (10,704); Iowa City, Iowa
11/17/2012*; 3:00 pm	at Wichtia State; Cancún Challenge	L 50–69	0–3	Charles Koch Arena (10,183); Wichita, Kansas
11/20/2012*; 4:00 pm	vs. Gardner–Webb; Cancún Challenge	L 43–55	0–4	Moon Palace Resort (902); Cancún, Mexico
11/21/2012*; 1:30 pm	vs. Western Carolina; Cancún Challenge	L 67–69	0–5	Moon Palace Resort (302); Cancún, Mexico
11/25/2012*; 2:00 pm	Wilmington (DE)	W 66–50	1–5	Burr Gymnasium (279); Washington, D.C.
11/27/2012*; 7:00 pm, Pitt Panthers TV/ESPN3	at Pittsburgh	L 46–70	1–6	Petersen Events Center (8,025); Pittsburgh
12/01/2012; 8:00 pm	at Hampton	L 50–58	1–7 (0–1)	Hampton Convocation Center (4,832); Hampton, Virginia
12/04/2012*; 7:00 pm	American	W 55–50	2–7	Burr Gymnasium (687); Washington, D.C.
12/06/2012*; 7:00 pm	at William & Mary	L 69–78	2–8	Kaplan Arena (2,315); Williamsburg, Virginia
12/15/2012*; 4:00 pm	Liberty	W 60–53	3–8	Burr Gymnasium (205); Washington, D.C.
12/19/2012*; 10:00 pm, Pac-12 Network	at Oregon State	L 53–69	3–9	Gill Coliseum (3,879); Corvallis, Oregon
12/21/2012*; 7:30 pm	at Rutgers	L 55–79	3–10	The RAC (5,924); Piscataway, New Jersey
12/28/2012*; 7:00 pm	at UCF; UCF Holiday Tournament	L 45–62	3–11	UCF Arena (4,401); Orlando, Florida
12/29/2012*; 5:00 pm	vs. Boston University; UCF Holiday Tournament	L 44–71	3–12	UCF Arena (4,278); Orlando, Florida
01/05/2013; 4:00 pm	at Coppin State	W 70–60	4–12 (1–1)	Physical Education Complex (708); Baltimore
01/12/2013; 4:00 pm	Hampton	L 49–51	4–13 (1–2)	Burr Gymnasium (1,134); Washington, D.C.
01/14/2013; 7:00 pm, ESPNU	Norfolk State	L 49–54	4–14 (1–3)	Burr Gymnasium (1,024); Washington, D.C.
01/19/2013; 4:00 pm	at North Carolina A&T	L 37–61	4–15 (1–4)	Corbett Sports Center (3,189); Greensboro, North Carolina
01/21/2013; 7:30 pm	at North Carolina Central	L 36–71	4–16 (1–5)	McLendon–McDougald Gymnasium (2,297); Durham, North Carolina
01/23/2013; 7:30 pm	at Delaware State	L 46–63	4–17 (1–6)	Memorial Hall (1,487); Dover, Delaware
02/02/2013; 4:00 pm	Savannah State	L 42–52	4–18 (1–7)	Burr Gymnasium (556); Washington, D.C.
02/04/2013; 7:40 pm	South Carolina State	W 57–45	5–18 (2–7)	Burr Gymnasium (576); Washington, D.C.
02/09/2013; 4:00 pm	Maryland–Eastern Shore	W 63–44	6–18 (3–7)	Burr Gymnasium (408); Washington, D.C.
02/11/2013; 7:30 pm	Morgan State	L 51–53	6–19 (3–8)	Burr Gymnasium; Washington, D.C.
02/16/2013; 6:15 pm	at Florida A&M	L 45–46	6–20 (3–9)	Teaching Arena (849); Tallahassee, Florida
02/18/2013; 7:30 pm	at Bethune-Cookman	L 50–64	6–21 (3–10)	Moore Gymnasium (612); Daytona Beach, Florida
02/23/2013; 4:00 pm	Coppin State	L 56–63	6–22 (3–11)	Burr Gymnasium (N/A); Washington, D.C.
02/25/2013; 7:55 pm	at Maryland–Eastern Shore	W 49–45	7–22 (4–11)	Hytche Athletic Center (2,081); Princess Anne, Maryland
03/02/2013; 6:00 pm	Delaware State	L 53–56	7–23 (4–12)	Burr Gymnasium (N/A); Washington, D.C.
2013 MEAC men's basketball tournament
03/12/2013; 9:00 pm	vs. Delaware State; First Round	L 61–73	7–24	Norfolk Scope (2,591); Norfolk, Virginia
*Non-conference game. ^{#}Rankings from AP Poll. (#) Tournament seedings in parentheses. All times are in Eastern Time.
