= 2012–13 Florida A&M Rattlers basketball team =

American college basketball season

2012–13 Florida A&M Rattlers men's basketball
- Conference: Mid-Eastern Athletic Conference
- Record: 8–23 (5–11 MEAC)
- Head coach: Clemon Johnson (2nd season)
- Assistant coaches: Chadrick Johnson; Condric Sanders; Maurice Sheals
- Home arena: Teaching Gym

2012–13 MEAC men's basketball standings
| | Conf. | | | | Overall |
| Team | W | | L | PCT | W | | L | PCT |
|---|---|---|---|---|---|---|---|---|
| Norfolk State | 16 | – | 0 | 1.000 | 21 | – | 12 | .636 |
| North Carolina Central | 15 | – | 1 | .938 | 22 | – | 9 | .710 |
| Savannah State | 11 | – | 5 | .688 | 19 | – | 15 | .559 |
| Hampton | 11 | – | 5 | .688 | 14 | – | 17 | .452 |
| Morgan State | 10 | – | 6 | .625 | 17 | – | 15 | .531 |
| North Carolina A&T † | 8 | – | 8 | .500 | 20 | – | 17 | .541 |
| Delaware State | 8 | – | 8 | .500 | 15 | – | 18 | .455 |
| Bethune–Cookman | 7 | – | 9 | .438 | 14 | – | 20 | .412 |
| Florida A&M | 5 | – | 11 | .313 | 8 | – | 23 | .258 |
| Coppin State | 5 | – | 11 | .313 | 8 | – | 24 | .250 |
| Howard | 4 | – | 12 | .250 | 7 | – | 24 | .226 |
| South Carolina State | 2 | – | 14 | .125 | 6 | – | 24 | .200 |
| Maryland Eastern Shore | 2 | – | 14 | .125 | 2 | – | 26 | .071 |
† 2013 MEAC tournament winner As of March 21, 2013; Rankings from AP Poll

The 2012–13 Florida A&M Rattlers basketball team represented Florida A&M University during the 2012–13 NCAA Division I men's basketball season. The Rattlers, led by second year head coach Clemon Johnson, played their home games at the Teaching Gym and were members of the Mid-Eastern Athletic Conference. They finished the season 8–23, 5–11 in MEAC play to finish in a tie for ninth place. They lost in the first round of the MEAC tournament to North Carolina A&T.

== Roster ==
| Number | Name | Position | Height | Weight | Year | Hometown |
|---|---|---|---|---|---|---|
| 1 | Chuka, Eneh | Guard | 6–7 | 195 | Freshman | Dallas, Texas |
| 2 | Jakari Bush | Guard | 5–7 | 151 | Freshman | Tallahassee, Florida |
| 3 | Jamie Adams | Guard | 5–10 | 166 | Junior | Chicago, Illinois |
| 12 | Reggie Lewis | Guard | 6–2 | 200 | Junior | Cleveland, Ohio |
| 15 | D'Andre Bullard | Guard | 6–4 | 185 | Sophomore | Orlando, Florida |
| 21 | Markee Teal | Forward | 6–7 | 235 | Senior | Ocala, Florida |
| 22 | Mohammad Abdul-Aleem | Guard | 6–4 | 210 | Junior | Atlanta, Georgia |
| 23 | Jamari Bradford | Forward | 6–6 | 210 | Junior | Louisville, Kentucky |
| 25 | Trey Kellum | Forward | 6–6 | 205 | Freshman | Peoria, Illinois |
| 32 | McWisdom Badejo | Center | 6–9 | 250 | Freshman | Dallas, Texas |
| 33 | Walter Davis | Guard | 6–5 | 190 | Junior | Memphis, Tennessee |
| 42 | Onyekachukwu Odi | Forward | 6–8 | 230 | Junior | Nigeria |

== Schedule ==
| Date time, TV | Rank^{#} | Opponent^{#} | Result | Record | Site (attendance) city, state |
Exhibition
| 11/01/2012*; 7:00 pm | | Albany State | W 85–63 | | Teaching Gym; Tallahassee, FL |
Regular season
| 11/09/2012*; 1:00 pm | | at Houston | L 76–81 | 0–1 | Hofheinz Pavilion (6,108); Houston, TX |
| 11/13/2012*; 7:00 pm | | at Stetson | L 66–88 | 0–2 | Edmunds Center (615); DeLand, FL |
| 11/18/2012*; 2:00 pm, P12N | | at Arizona State; Las Vegas Invitational | L 70–97 | 0–3 | Wells Fargo Arena (3,107); Tempe, AZ |
| 11/20/2012*; 8:00 pm, ESPN3 | | at Arkansas; Las Vegas Invitational | L 60–89 | 0–4 | Bud Walton Arena (11,828); Fayetteville, AR |
| 11/23/2012*; 2:00 pm | | vs. Longwood; Las Vegas Invitational | L 83–86 ^{OT} | 0–5 | Orleans Arena (200); Paradise, NV |
| 11/24/2012*; 3:00 pm | | vs. Presbyterian; Las Vegas Invitational | W 69–55 | 1–5 | Orleans Arena (200); Paradise, NV |
| 11/29/2012*; 7:00 pm | | at North Florida | L 47–72 | 1–6 | UNF Arena (1,580); Jacksonville, FL |
| 12/01/2012; 6:00 pm | | Bethune-Cookman | W 75–67 | 2–6 (1–0) | Teaching Gym (857); Tallahassee, FL |
| 12/04/2012*; 7:00 pm | | Edward Waters | W 87–69 | 3–6 | Teaching Gym (798); Tallahassee, FL |
| 12/08/2012*; 4:00 pm | | Allen | W 109–59 | 4–6 | Teaching Gym (575); Tallahassee, FL |
| 12/15/2012*; 7:00 pm, ESPN3 | | at Clemson | L 57–80 | 4–7 | Littlejohn Coliseum (7,862); Clemson, SC |
| 12/29/2012*; 4:00 pm, ESPN3 | | at Georgia | L 73–82 | 4–8 | Stegeman Coliseum (6,149); Athens, GA |
| 12/31/2012*; 1:00 pm, FSSW | | at Texas Tech | L 56–70 | 4–9 | United Spirit Arena (5,404); Lubbock, TX |
| 01/02/2013*; 7:00 pm | | at FIU | L 72–88 | 4–10 | U.S. Century Bank Arena (778); Miami, FL |
| 01/05/2013*; 4:00 pm | | at UCF | L 69–99 | 4–11 | UCF Arena (3,956); Orlando, FL |
| 01/12/2013; 6:00 pm | | North Carolina Central | L 62–85 | 4–12 (1–1) | Teaching Gym (825); Tallahassee, FL |
| 01/14/2013; 7:30 pm | | North Carolina A&T | L 40–68 | 4–13 (1–2) | Teaching Gym (659); Tallahassee, FL |
| 01/19/2013; 6:00 pm | | at Savannah State | L 55–57 | 4–14 (1–3) | Tiger Arena (1,923); Savannah, GA |
| 01/21/2013; 7:30 pm | | at South Carolina State | W 89–77 | 5–14 (2–3) | SHM Memorial Center (649); Orangeburg, SC |
| 01/26/2013; 6:00 pm | | Maryland–Eastern Shore | W 55–54 | 6–14 (3–3) | Teaching Gym (759); Tallahassee, FL |
| 01/28/2013; 7:30 pm | | Delaware State | L 48–57 | 6–15 (3–4) | Teaching Gym (706); Tallahassee, FL |
| 02/02/2013; 4:00 pm | | Bethune-Cookman | L 65–67 ^{OT} | 6–16 (3–5) | Teaching Gym (1,400); Tallahassee, FL |
| 02/09/2013; 4:00 pm | | at North Carolina Central | L 43–51 | 6–17 (3–6) | McLendon–McDougald Gymnasium (1,811); Durham, NC |
| 02/11/2013; 8:15 pm | | at North Carolina A&T | L 56–64 | 6–18 (3–7) | Corbett Sports Center (1,839); Greensboro, NC |
| 02/14/2013; 6:00 pm | | Savannah State | L 65–67 | 6–19 (3–8) | Teaching Gym (567); Tallahassee, FL |
| 02/16/2013; 6:15 pm | | Howard | W 46–45 | 7–19 (4–8) | Teaching Gym (849); Tallahassee, FL |
| 02/25/2013; 7:30 pm | | South Carolina State | W 75–72 ^{2OT} | 8–19 (5–8) | Teaching Gym (652); Tallahassee, FL |
| 03/02/2013; 6:00 pm | | at Hampton | L 68–77 | 8–20 (5–9) | Hampton Convocation Center (4,243); Hampton, VA |
| 03/04/2013; 8:00 pm | | at Norfolk State | L 58–69 | 8–21 (5–10) | Joseph G. Echols Memorial Hall (1,140); Norfolk, VA |
| 03/07/2013; 8:00 pm | | at Morgan State | L 67–78 | 8–22 (5–11) | Talmadge L. Hill Field House (4,358); Baltimore, MD |
2013 MEAC men's basketball tournament
| 03/12/2013; 6:30 pm | (10) | vs. (7) North Carolina A&T; First Round | L 54–65 | 8–23 | Norfolk Scope (2,591); Norfolk, VA |
*Non-conference game. ^{#}Rankings from AP Poll. (#) Tournament seedings in parentheses. All times are in Eastern Time.
