= 2012–13 Delaware State Hornets men's basketball team =

American college basketball season

2012–13 Delaware State Hornets men's basketball
- Conference: Mid-Eastern Athletic Conference
- Record: 15–18 (8–8 MEAC)
- Head coach: Greg Jackson (13th season)
- Assistant coaches: Arthur Tyson; Keith Walker; Jarrell Wilkerson
- Home arena: Memorial Hall

2012–13 MEAC men's basketball standings
	Conf.				Overall
Team	W		L	PCT	W		L	PCT
Norfolk State	16	–	0	1.000	21	–	12	.636
North Carolina Central	15	–	1	.938	22	–	9	.710
Savannah State	11	–	5	.688	19	–	15	.559
Hampton	11	–	5	.688	14	–	17	.452
Morgan State	10	–	6	.625	17	–	15	.531
North Carolina A&T †	8	–	8	.500	20	–	17	.541
Delaware State	8	–	8	.500	15	–	18	.455
Bethune–Cookman	7	–	9	.438	14	–	20	.412
Florida A&M	5	–	11	.313	8	–	23	.258
Coppin State	5	–	11	.313	8	–	24	.250
Howard	4	–	12	.250	7	–	24	.226
South Carolina State	2	–	14	.125	6	–	24	.200
Maryland Eastern Shore	2	–	14	.125	2	–	26	.071
† 2013 MEAC tournament winner As of March 21, 2013; Rankings from AP Poll

The 2012–13 Delaware State Hornets men's basketball team represented Delaware State University during the 2012–13 NCAA Division I men's basketball season. The Hornets, led by 13th-year head coach Greg Jackson, played their home games at the Memorial Hall and were members of the Mid-Eastern Athletic Conference. They finished the season 15–18, 8–8 in MEAC play, to finish in a tie for sixth place. They advanced to the semifinals of the MEAC tournament where they lost to North Carolina A&T.

== Roster ==
Number	Name	Position	Height	Weight	Year	Hometown
1	Kendall Gray	Center	6–10	240	Sophomore	Dover, Delaware
2	Jabari Joyner	Guard	5–7	160	Senior	Neptune City, New Jersey
3	Tyshawn Bell	Forward	6–7	215	Sophomore	Dover, Delaware
4	Cahli Thomas	Guard	6–1	180	Freshman	Washington, D.C.
5	Bryan Scott	Forward/Center	6–10	215	Sophomore	Washington, D.C.
10	Miles Bowman Jr.	Guard	6–5	190	Freshman	Winston-Salem, North Carolina
11	Tahj Tate	Guard	6–4	190	Sophomore	Easley, South Carolina
13	Albert Thomas	Guard	5–10	160	Junior	Fort Washington, Maryland
20	Brandon Oliver	Guard	6–2	185	Senior	Durham, North Carolina
21	Scott Sill	Forward	6–9	215	Freshman	Windsor, Connecticut
22	Casey Walker	Guard	6–5	175	Junior	Brodnax, Virginia
23	Lewis Lott	Guard	6–0	165	Junior	Woodbridge, Virginia
30	Jordan Lawson	Guard	6–5	210	Junior	Durham, North Carolina
32	Marques Oliver	Forward	6–7	220	Senior	Durham, North Carolina
34	Chris Lewis	Guard	5–11	165	Freshman	Willingboro Township, New Jersey
35	Nick Doyle	Guard/Forward	6–4	195	Freshman	Franklin, Virginia
44	Amere May	Guard	6–1	175	Sophomore	Covert, Michigan
45	Ashwell Boyd	Guard	6–4	180	Freshman	Arlington, Texas
55	Michael Coger	Center	6–9	235	Senior	Greensboro, North Carolina

== Schedule ==
Date time, TV	Opponent	Result	Record	Site (attendance) city, state
Regular season
November 10, 2012*; 7:00 pm	Gwynedd–Mercy	W 74–56	1–0	Memorial Hall (1,249); Dover, Delaware
November 12, 2012*; 7:00 pm	Cairn	W 95–46	2–0	Memorial Hall; Dover, Delaware
November 14, 2012*; 7:00 pm	Wagner	W 73–69 ^{OT}	3–0	Memorial Hall (1,178); Dover, Delaware
November 18, 2012*; 3:00 pm	at Illinois State; South Padre Island Invitational	L 48–87	3–1	Redbird Arena (5,660); Normal, Illinois
November 20, 2012*; 8:00 pm	at Northwestern; South Padre Island Invitational	L 50–69	3–2	Welsh-Ryan Arena (5,012); Evanston, Illinois
November 23, 2012*; 1:00 pm	vs. Fairleigh Dickinson; South Padre Island Invitational	L 62–63	3–3	South Padre Island Convention Centre (N/A); South Padre Island, Texas
November 24, 2012*; 11:45 am	vs. Navy; South Padre Island Invitational	L 53–63	3–4	South Padre Island Convention Centre (N/A); South Padre Island, Texas
November 28, 2012*; 7:00 pm	at Eastern Kentucky	L 51–84	3–5	Alumni Coliseum (1,175); Richmond, Kentucky
December 1, 2012; 3:00 pm	Maryland–Eastern Shore	W 76–66	4–5 (1–0)	Memorial Hall (1,528); Dover, Delaware
December 8, 2012*; 2:00 pm	at Delaware	W 73–67	5–5	Bob Carpenter Center (2,454); Newark, Delaware
December 15, 2012*; 2:00 pm	at Penn State	L 76–80 ^{OT}	5–6	Bryce Jordan Center (5,751); University Park, Pennsylvania
December 19, 2012*; 7:00 pm, Pitt Panthers TV	at Pittsburgh	L 43–71	5–7	Petersen Events Center (9,522); Pittsburgh, Pennsylvania
December 29, 2012*; 12:30 pm, ESPN3	at Maryland	L 50–79	5–8	Comcast Center (12,389); College Park, Maryland
January 2, 2013*; 7:00 pm	at Marshall	W 53–51	6–8	Cam Henderson Center (5,039); Huntington, West Virginia
January 5, 2013*; 8:00 pm, ESPN3	at Arkansas	L 51–86	6–9	Bud Walton Arena (12,644); Fayetteville, Arkansas
January 19, 2013; 4:25 pm	at Maryland–Eastern Shore	L 53–58	6–10 (1–1)	Hytche Athletic Center (2,018); Princess Anne, Maryland
January 23, 2013; 7:30 pm	Howard	W 63–46	7–10 (2–1)	Memorial Hall (1,487); Dover, Delaware
January 26, 2013; 4:00 pm	at Bethune-Cookman	W 68–52	8–10 (3–1)	Moore Gymnasium (1,001); Daytona Beach, Florida
January 28, 2013; 7:30 pm	at Florida A&M	W 57–48	9–10 (4–1)	Teaching Gym (706); Tallahassee, Florida
February 2, 2013; 4:00 pm	North Carolina Central	L 43–54	9–11 (4–2)	Memorial Hall (1,471); Dover, Delaware
February 4, 2013; 7:30 pm	North Carolina A&T	W 53–44	10–11 (5–2)	Memorial Hall (1,356); Dover, Delaware
February 9, 2013; 6:00 pm	at Norfolk State	L 56–74	10–12 (5–3)	Joseph G. Echols Memorial Hall (3,847); Norfolk, Virginia
February 11, 2013; 8:00 pm	at Hampton	L 84–85 ^{2OT}	10–13 (5–4)	Hampton Convocation Center (3,965); Hampton, Virginia
February 16, 2013; 4:30 pm	Coppin State	W 57–43	11–13 (6–4)	Memorial Hall (1,348); Dover, Delaware
February 18, 2013; 8:00 pm	Morgan State	W 52–50	12–13 (7–4)	Memorial Hall (1,202); Dover, Delaware
February 23, 2013; 4:00 pm	Norfolk State	L 56–60	12–14 (7–5)	Memorial Hall (1,843); Dover, Delaware
February 25, 2013; 7:40 pm	Hampton	L 50–57	12–15 (7–6)	Memorial Hall (1,368); Dover, Delaware
March 2, 2013; 6:00 pm	at Howard	W 56–53	13–15 (8–6)	Burr Gymnasium (N/A); Washington, D.C.
March 4, 2013; 7:45 pm	at Morgan State	L 47–66	13–16 (8–7)	Talmadge L. Hill Field House (1,008); Baltimore, Maryland
March 7, 2013; 7:30 pm	at South Carolina State	L 60–62	13–17 (8–8)	SHM Memorial Center (1,328); Orangeburg, South Carolina
2013 MEAC men's basketball tournament
March 12, 2013; 9:00 pm	vs. Howard; First Round	W 73–61	14–17	Norfolk Scope (2,591); Norfolk, Virginia
March 14, 2013; 6:00 pm	vs. Hampton; Quarterfinals	W 63–60	15–17	Norfolk Scope (N/A); Norfolk, Virginia
March 15, 2013; 8:30 pm	vs. North Carolina A&T; Semifinals	L 78–84	15–18	Norfolk Scope (N/A); Norfolk, Virginia
*Non-conference game. ^{#}Rankings from AP poll. (#) Tournament seedings in parentheses. All times are in Eastern Time.
