= 2013 MEAC men's basketball tournament =

- 2013 MEAC Tournament logo
- Classification: Division I
- Season: 2012–13
- Teams: 13
- Site: Norfolk Scope; Norfolk, Virginia
- Champions: North Carolina A&T (16th title)
- Winning coach: Cy Alexander (6th title)
- Television: ESPNU

The 2013 Mid-Eastern Athletic Conference men's basketball tournament took place March 11–16, 2013 at the Norfolk Scope in Norfolk, Virginia. The tournament winner, North Carolina A&T, received an automatic bid into the 2013 NCAA tournament. 2013 was the first year in Norfolk after the last eight years in Winston-Salem, North Carolina. First Round games were played on March 11 and March 12, with the Quarterfinal games played March 13 and March 14. The semifinals were held March 15, with the Championship game being played on March 16. ESPNU televised the Championship Game.

2012–13 MEAC men's basketball standings
| | Conf. | | | | Overall |
| Team | W | | L | PCT | W | | L | PCT |
|---|---|---|---|---|---|---|---|---|
| Norfolk State | 16 | – | 0 | 1.000 | 21 | – | 12 | .636 |
| North Carolina Central | 15 | – | 1 | .938 | 22 | – | 9 | .710 |
| Savannah State | 11 | – | 5 | .688 | 19 | – | 15 | .559 |
| Hampton | 11 | – | 5 | .688 | 14 | – | 17 | .452 |
| Morgan State | 10 | – | 6 | .625 | 17 | – | 15 | .531 |
| North Carolina A&T † | 8 | – | 8 | .500 | 20 | – | 17 | .541 |
| Delaware State | 8 | – | 8 | .500 | 15 | – | 18 | .455 |
| Bethune–Cookman | 7 | – | 9 | .438 | 14 | – | 20 | .412 |
| Florida A&M | 5 | – | 11 | .313 | 8 | – | 23 | .258 |
| Coppin State | 5 | – | 11 | .313 | 8 | – | 24 | .250 |
| Howard | 4 | – | 12 | .250 | 7 | – | 24 | .226 |
| South Carolina State | 2 | – | 14 | .125 | 6 | – | 24 | .200 |
| Maryland Eastern Shore | 2 | – | 14 | .125 | 2 | – | 26 | .071 |
† 2013 MEAC tournament winner As of March 21, 2013; Rankings from AP Poll

== Bracket ==
First round March 11 and March 12
8 | Bethune–Cookman | 89
9 | Coppin State | 76
4 | Savannah State | 59
13 | Maryland Eastern Shore | 44
5 | Morgan State | 61
12 | South Carolina State | 52
7 | North Carolina A&T | 68
10 | Florida A&M | 40
6 | Delaware State | 73
11 | Howard | 61

Quarterfinals; March 13 and March 14
1 | Norfolk State | 68^{OT}
8 | Bethune–Cookman | 70
4 | Savannah State | 61^{OT}
5 | Morgan State | 64
2 | North Carolina Central | 42
7 | North Carolina A&T | 55
3 | Hampton | 60
6 | Delaware State | 63

Semifinals; March 15
8 | Bethune–Cookman | 71
5 | Morgan State | 82
7 | North Carolina A&T | 78
6 | Delaware State | 74

Championship Game; March 16; ESPNU
5 | Morgan State | 54
7 | North Carolina A&T | 57
