= 2012–13 Morgan State Bears basketball team =

American college basketball season

2012–13 Morgan State Bears men's basketball
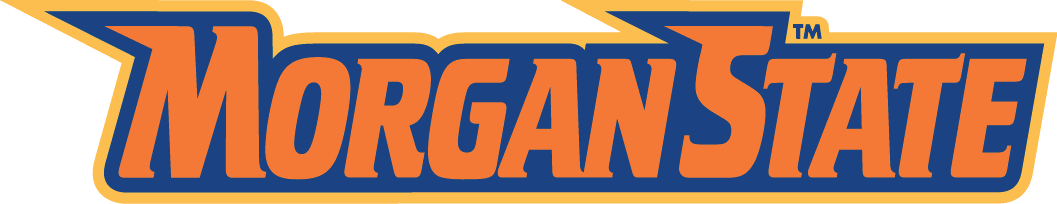
- Conference: Mid-Eastern Athletic Conference
- Record: 17–15 (10–6 MEAC)
- Head coach: Todd Bozeman (7th season)
- Assistant coaches: Kevin McClain; Keith Goodie; Glenroy Palmer; Ulysses Lee
- Home arena: Talmadge L. Hill Field House

2012–13 MEAC men's basketball standings
	Conf.				Overall
Team	W		L	PCT	W		L	PCT
Norfolk State	16	–	0	1.000	21	–	12	.636
North Carolina Central	15	–	1	.938	22	–	9	.710
Savannah State	11	–	5	.688	19	–	15	.559
Hampton	11	–	5	.688	14	–	17	.452
Morgan State	10	–	6	.625	17	–	15	.531
North Carolina A&T †	8	–	8	.500	20	–	17	.541
Delaware State	8	–	8	.500	15	–	18	.455
Bethune–Cookman	7	–	9	.438	14	–	20	.412
Florida A&M	5	–	11	.313	8	–	23	.258
Coppin State	5	–	11	.313	8	–	24	.250
Howard	4	–	12	.250	7	–	24	.226
South Carolina State	2	–	14	.125	6	–	24	.200
Maryland Eastern Shore	2	–	14	.125	2	–	26	.071
† 2013 MEAC tournament winner As of March 21, 2013; Rankings from AP Poll

The 2012–13 Morgan State Bears men's basketball team represented Morgan State University during the 2012–13 NCAA Division I men's basketball season. The Bears, led by seventh year head coach Todd Bozeman, played their home games at the Talmadge L. Hill Field House and were members of the Mid-Eastern Athletic Conference. They finished the season 17–15, 10–6 in MEAC play to finish in fifth place. They advanced to the championship game of the MEAC tournament where they lost to North Carolina A&T.

== Roster ==
Number	Name	Position	Height	Weight	Year	Hometown
1	Donte Pretlow	Guard	6–0	185	Freshman	Baltimore, Maryland
3	Daryl Traynham	Guard	5–9	180	Junior	Melwood, Maryland
5	Justin Black	Guard/Forward	6–2	220	Junior	St. Louis, Missouri
10	Christian Kabongo	Guard	6–4	200	Junior	Toronto, Canada
11	Anthony Hubbard	Guard	6–5	225	Senior	Woodbridge, Virginia
12	Thair Heath	Forward	6–9	220	Junior	Los Angeles, California
21	Tauron Bailey	Forward	6–6	215	Junior	Harlem, New York
22	Blake Bozeman	Guard	6–2	170	Sophomore	Bowie, Maryland
23	Rasean Simpson	Guard	6–5	190	Freshman	San Diego, California
32	DeWayne Jackson	Forward	6–8	210	Senior	Bowie, Maryland
33	Daon Riley	Guard	6–2	190	Sophomore	Severn, Maryland
34	Cedric Blossom	Forward	6–6	225	Freshman	Columbia, Maryland
44	Shaquille Duncan	Forward	6–9	208	Sophomore	Philadelphia, Pennsylvania
50	Ian Chiles	Center	7–2	270	Junior	Cliffside Park, New Jersey

== Schedule ==
Date time, TV	Opponent	Result	Record	Site (attendance) city, state
Regular season
11/09/2012*; 4:15 pm	vs. UTSA; Liberty Tax Classic	W 71–59	1–0	Ted Constant Convocation Center (7,283); Norfolk, VA
11/10/2012*; 7:15 pm	at Old Dominion; Liberty Tax Classic	L 61–72	1–1	Ted Constant Convocation Center (6,993); Norfolk, VA
11/11/2012*; 4:15 pm	vs. Holy Cross; Liberty Tax Classic	L 73–74	1–2	Ted Constant Convocation Center (6,233); Norfolk, VA
11/16/2012*; 7:00 pm	at South Carolina	L 71–87	1–3	Colonial Life Arena (8,019); Columbia, SC
11/29/2012*; 7:00 pm, ESPN3	at Liberty	W 67–62	2–3	Vines Center (2,233); Kynchburg, VA
12/01/2012*; 1:00 pm	at VMI	W 81–80 ^{OT}	3–3	Cameron Hall (2,684); Lexington, VA
12/16/2012*; 5:35 pm	at Illinois State	L 68–87	3–4	Redbird Arena (4,911); Normal, IL
12/19/2012*; 7:00 pm, ESPN3	at Virginia	L 57–75	3–5	John Paul Jones Arena (8,319); Charlottesville, VA
12/27/2012*; 10:00 pm	at Loyola Marymount	L 62–79	3–6	Gersten Pavilion (1,220); Los Angeles, CA
12/29/2012*; 10:30 pm	at San Diego	L 63–66	3–7	Jenny Craig Pavilion (1,277); San Diego, CA
01/05/2013*; 4:00 pm	Saint Joseph's	L 60–70	3–8	Talmadge L. Hill Field House (856); Baltimore, MD
01/12/2013; 4:30 pm	South Carolina State	W 76–60	4–8 (1–0)	Talmadge L. Hill Field House (1,024); Baltimore, MD
01/14/2013; 7:50 pm	Savannah State	L 70–78 ^{2OT}	4–9 (1–1)	Talmadge L. Hill Field House (1,079); Baltimore, MD
01/19/2013; 6:30 pm	at Hampton	W 80–78	5–9 (2–1)	Hampton Convocation Center (4,732); Hampton, VA
01/21/2013; 8:00 pm	at Norfolk State	L 71–73	5–10 (2–2)	Joseph G. Echols Memorial Hall (2,586); Norfolk, VA
01/26/2013; 4:00 pm	at North Carolina A&T	W 55–52	6–10 (3–2)	Corbett Sports Center (1,610); Greensboro, NC
01/28/2013; 7:30 pm	at North Carolina Central	L 61–69	6–11 (3–3)	McLendon–McDougald Gymnasium (2,417); Durham, NC
02/02/2013; 4:00 pm	Hampton	L 62–64	6–12 (3–4)	Talmadge L. Hill Field House (1,120); Baltimore, MD
02/04/2013; 7:30 pm	Norfolk State	L 59–64	6–13 (3–5)	Talmadge L. Hill Field House (3,012); Baltimore, MD
02/09/2013; 4:30 pm	at Coppin State	W 80–51	7–13 (4–5)	Physical Education Complex (2,516); Baltimore, MD
02/11/2013; 7:30 pm	at Howard	W 53–51	8–13 (5–5)	Burr Gymnasium; Washington, D.C.
02/16/2013; 4:30 pm	at Maryland–Eastern Shore	W 87–55	9–13 (6–5)	Hytche Athletic Center (5,128); Princess Anne, MD
02/18/2013; 8:00 pm	at Delaware State	L 50–52	9–14 (6–6)	Memorial Hall (1,202); Dover, DE
02/23/2013*; 7:00 pm	at High Point; BracketBusters	W 75–68	10–14	Millis Center (1,714); High Point, NC
02/27/2013; 7:30 pm	Coppin State	W 86–68	11–14 (7–6)	Talmadge L. Hill Field House (4,789); Baltimore, MD
03/02/2013; 4:00 pm	Maryland-Eastern Shore	W 58–45	12–14 (8–6)	Talmadge L. Hill Field House (2,239); Baltimore, MD
03/04/2013; 7:45 pm	Delaware State	W 66–47	13–14 (9–6)	Talmadge L. Hill Field House (1,008); Baltimore, MD
03/07/2013; 8:00 pm	Florida A&M	W 78–67	14–14 (10–6)	Talmadge L. Hill Field House (4,358); Baltimore, MD
2013 MEAC men's basketball tournament
03/11/2013; 9:00 pm	vs. South Carolina State; First Round	W 61–52	15–14	Norfolk Scope (1,562); Norfolk, VA
03/14/2013; 8:30 pm	vs. Savannah State; Quarterfinals	W 64–61 ^{OT}	16–14	Norfolk Scope (N/A); Norfolk, VA
03/15/2013; 6:00 pm	vs. Behtune-Cookman; Semifinals	W 82–71	17–14	Norfolk Scope (N/A); Norfolk, VA
03/16/2013; 5:00 pm, ESPNU	vs. North Carolina A&T; Championship Game	L 54–57	17–15	Norfolk Scope (N/A); Norfolk, VA
*Non-conference game. ^{#}Rankings from AP Poll. (#) Tournament seedings in parentheses. All times are in Eastern Time.
