= 2012–13 South Carolina State Bulldogs basketball team =

American college basketball season

2012–13 South Carolina State Bulldogs men's basketball
- Conference: Mid-Eastern Athletic Conference
- Record: 6–24 (2–14 MEAC)
- Head coach: Tim Carter (6th season)
- Assistant coaches: Murray Garvin; Kevin Spencer; Rio Pitt
- Home arena: SHM Memorial Center

2012–13 MEAC men's basketball standings
	Conf.				Overall
Team	W		L	PCT	W		L	PCT
Norfolk State	16	–	0	1.000	21	–	12	.636
North Carolina Central	15	–	1	.938	22	–	9	.710
Savannah State	11	–	5	.688	19	–	15	.559
Hampton	11	–	5	.688	14	–	17	.452
Morgan State	10	–	6	.625	17	–	15	.531
North Carolina A&T †	8	–	8	.500	20	–	17	.541
Delaware State	8	–	8	.500	15	–	18	.455
Bethune–Cookman	7	–	9	.438	14	–	20	.412
Florida A&M	5	–	11	.313	8	–	23	.258
Coppin State	5	–	11	.313	8	–	24	.250
Howard	4	–	12	.250	7	–	24	.226
South Carolina State	2	–	14	.125	6	–	24	.200
Maryland Eastern Shore	2	–	14	.125	2	–	26	.071
† 2013 MEAC tournament winner As of March 21, 2013; Rankings from AP Poll

The 2012–13 South Carolina State Bulldogs basketball team represented South Carolina State University during the 2012–13 NCAA Division I men's basketball season. The Bulldogs, led by sixth year head coach Tim Carter, played their home games at the SHM Memorial Center and were members of the Mid-Eastern Athletic Conference. Murray Garvin became head coach when head coach Tim Carter resigned midway through the 2012-2013 season.

The team finished the season 6–24, 2–14 in MEAC play to finish in a tie for twelfth place. They lost in the first round of the MEAC tournament to Morgan State.

== Roster ==
Number	Name	Position	Height	Weight	Year	Hometown
1	Khalif Toombs	Guard	5–9	165	Senior	Atlantic City, New Jersey
2	Theron Stephens	Guard	5–9	165	Junior	Reading, Pennsylvania
3	Joshua Benjamin	Guard	5–10	185	Freshman	Orlando, Florida
5	Louis Adams	Guard	6–1	170	Junior	Dakar, Senegal
10	Patrick Myers	Guard	6–2	175	Freshman	Orangeburg, South Carolina
11	Shaquille Mitchell	Guard	6–4	185	Freshman	Hollywood, South Carolina
15	Devin Joint	Guard	6–4	190	Sophomore	Darlington, South Carolina
20	Chasen Campbell	Forward	6–8	270	Junior	Charlotte, North Carolina
21	Dominique Youmans	Forward	6–10	230	Junior	Philadelphia, Pennsylvania
22	Matthew Hezekiah	Forward	6–11	235	Junior	Jacksonville, Florida
24	Terrance Linton	Guard	6–2	170	Freshman	Orlando, Florida
25	Omari Bennett	Forward	6–5	205	Junior	Brooklyn, New York
30	Darryl Palmer	Forward	6–7	190	Freshman	Summerville, South Carolina
32	Randall Black	Guard	6–4	180	Junior	Cleveland, Ohio
33	Luka Radovic	Forward	6–9	220	Sophomore	Podgorica, Montenegro

== Schedule ==
Date time, TV	Opponent	Result	Record	Site (attendance) city, state
Regular season
11/09/2012*; 7:00 pm	at Claflin; Garden City Basketball Classic	W 81–62	1–0	Tullis Arena (1,885); Orangeburg, SC
11/12/2012*; 7:30 pm	Kennesaw State	L 65–67 ^{OT}	1–1	SHM Memorial Center (1,687); Orangeburg, SC
11/15/2012*; 7:30 pm	Webber International	W 86–66	2–1	SHM Memorial Center (1,457); Orangeburg, SC
11/18/2012*; 7:30 pm	NJIT	W 77–74	3–1	SHM Memorial Center (N/A); Orangeburg, SC
11/20/2012*; 7:30 pm	Albany	L 55–83	3–2	SHM Memorial Center (N/A); Orangeburg, SC
11/24/2012*; 2:00 pm	at NJIT	L 63–72	3–3	Fleisher Athletic Center (177); Newark, NJ
11/28/2012*; 7:30 pm	Jacksonville	W 74–72	4–3	SHM Memorial Center (975); Orangeburg, SC
12/03/2012; 7:30 pm	Norfolk State	L 72–78	4–4 (0–1)	SHM Memorial Center (1,047); Orangeburg, SC
12/08/2012*; 2:00 pm, ESPN3	at Maryland	L 46–61	4–5	Comcast Center (12,052); College Park, MD
12/12/2012*; 7:00 pm	at Albany	L 61–70	4–6	SEFCU Arena (2,371); Albany, NY
12/17/2012*; 8:00 pm, FS Midwest/ESPN3	at No. 12 Missouri	L 51–102	4–7	Mizzou Arena (10,613); Columbia, MO
12/19/2012*; 9:00 pm, Big Ten Network	at Iowa	L 46–90	4–8	Carver-Hawkeye Arena (12,158); Iowa City, IA
12/23/2012*; 2:00 pm, ESPN3	at Clemson	L 41–77	4–9	Littlejohn Coliseum (7,431); Clemson, SC
01/05/2013*; 1:30 pm, ESPN3	at South Carolina	L 69–80	4–10	Colonial Life Arena (7,394); Columbia, SC
01/12/2013; 4:30 pm	at Morgan State	L 60–76	4–11 (0–2)	Talmadge L. Hill Field House (1,024); Baltimore, MD
01/14/2013; 8:00 pm	at Coppin State	L 58–79	4–12 (0–3)	Physical Education Complex (209); Baltimore, MD
01/19/2013; 6:30 pm	Bethune-Cookman	L 52–60	4–13 (0–4)	SHM Memorial Center (662); Orangeburg, SC
01/21/2013; 7:30 pm	Florida A&M	L 77–89	4–14 (0–5)	SHM Memorial Center (649); Orangeburg, SC
01/26/2013; 6:00 pm	Savannah State	L 49–64	4–15 (0–6)	SHM Memorial Center (713); Orangeburg, SC
01/30/2013; 7:30 pm	Hampton	L 60–64	4–16 (0–7)	SHM Memorial Center (776); Orangeburg, SC
02/04/2013; 7:40 pm	at Howard	L 45–57	4–17 (0–8)	Burr Gymnasium (576); Washington, D.C.
02/09/2013; 6:00 pm	at Savannah State	L 46–50	4–18 (0–9)	Tiger Arena (989); Savannah, GA
02/16/2013; 6:15 pm	at North Carolina A&T	W 72–70	5–18 (1–9)	SHM Memorial Center (1,387); Orangeburg, SC
02/18/2013; 7:45 pm	North Carolina Central	L 52–71	5–19 (1–10)	SHM Memorial Center (1,038); Orangeburg, SC
02/23/2013; 4:00 pm	at Bethune-Cookman	L 75–85	5–20 (1–11)	Moore Gymnasium (1,081); Daytona Beach, FL
02/25/2013; 7:30 pm	at Florida A&M	L 72–75 ^{2OT}	5–21 (1–12)	Teaching Arena (652); Tallahassee, FL
03/02/2013; 4:00 pm	at North Carolina A&T	L 35–58	5–22 (1–13)	Corbett Sports Center; Greensboro, NC
03/04/2013; 7:45 pm	at North Carolina Central	L 54–62	5–23 (1–14)	McLendon–McDougald Gymnasium (912); Durham, NC
03/07/2013; 7:30 pm	at Delaware State	W 62–60	6–23 (2–14)	SHM Memorial Center (1,328); Orangeburg, SC
2013 MEAC men's basketball tournament
03/11/2013; 9:00 pm	vs. Morgan State; First Round	L 52–61	6–24	Norfolk Scope (1,562); Norfolk, VA
*Non-conference game. ^{#}Rankings from AP Poll. (#) Tournament seedings in parentheses. All times are in Eastern Time.
