= 2012–13 Maryland Terrapins men's basketball team =

American college basketball season

2012–13 Maryland Terrapins men's basketball
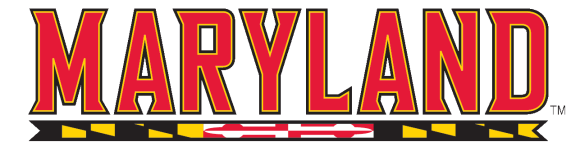

NIT, Semifinals
- Conference: Atlantic Coast Conference
- Record: 25–13 (8–10 ACC)
- Head coach: Mark Turgeon (2nd season)
- Assistant coaches: Dalonte Hill; Bino Ranson; Scott Spinelli
- Home arena: Comcast Center

2012–13 ACC men's basketball standings
	Conf.				Overall
Team	W		L	PCT	W		L	PCT
No. 5 Miami (FL) †	15	–	3	.833	29	–	7	.806
No. 6 Duke	14	–	4	.778	30	–	6	.833
North Carolina	12	–	6	.667	25	–	11	.694
Virginia	11	–	7	.611	23	–	12	.657
NC State	11	–	7	.611	24	–	11	.686
Florida State	9	–	9	.500	18	–	16	.529
Maryland	8	–	10	.444	25	–	13	.658
Boston College	7	–	11	.389	16	–	17	.485
Georgia Tech	6	–	12	.333	16	–	15	.516
Wake Forest	6	–	12	.333	13	–	18	.419
Clemson	5	–	13	.278	13	–	18	.419
Virginia Tech	4	–	14	.222	13	–	19	.406
† 2013 ACC tournament winner As of April 2, 2013; Rankings from AP Poll

The 2012–13 Maryland Terrapins men's basketball team represented the University of Maryland, College Park in 2012–13 NCAA Division I men's basketball season as a member of the Atlantic Coast Conference (ACC). The team, led by second year head coach Mark Turgeon, played their home games at the Comcast Center. They finished the season 25–13, 8–10 in ACC play to finish in seventh place. They advanced to the semifinals of the ACC tournament where they lost to North Carolina. They were invited to the 2013 NIT where they defeated Niagara, Denver and Alabama to advance to the semifinals at Madison Square Garden where they lost to Iowa.

Hometowns of team roster

== Preseason ==
=== Departures ===
Name	Number	Pos.	Height	Weight	Year	Hometown	Notes
Terrell Stoglin	12	G	6'1"	185	Sophomore	Tucson, Arizona	Suspended; Declared for NBA Draft
Berend Weijs	10	C	6'10"	200	Senior	Amsterdam, Netherlands	Graduated
Mychal Parker	11	G	6'5"	195	Sophomore	Washington, North Carolina	Suspended; Transferred
Ashton Pankey	30	F	6'9"	220	Redshirt Freshman	The Bronx, New York	Transferred
John Dillard	22	G	5'11"	165	Senior	Yorktown, Virginia	Graduated
Jonathan Thomas	24	G	6'2"	190	Junior	Frederick, Maryland	Left team
Arnold Richmond	13	G	5'11"	175	Freshman	Suitland, Maryland	Transferred
Sean Mosley	14	G	6'4"	210	Senior	Baltimore, Maryland	Graduated

=== Class of 2012 Signees ===
College recruiting
Name	Hometown	School	Height	Weight	Commit date
Shaquille Cleare; C	Andros, Bahamas	The Village School	6 ft 9 in (2.06 m)	280 lb (130 kg)	Aug 24, 2011
Shaquille Cleare; C	Recruit ratings: Scout: Rivals: ESPN: (96)				
Jake Layman; SF	Wrentham, Massachusetts	King Philip Regional High School	6 ft 8 in (2.03 m)	190 lb (86 kg)	Sep 6, 2011
Jake Layman; SF	Recruit ratings: Scout: Rivals: ESPN: (93)				
Charles Mitchell; PF	Marietta, Georgia	Wheeler High School	6 ft 7 in (2.01 m)	250 lb (110 kg)	Mar 8, 2012
Charles Mitchell; PF	Recruit ratings: Scout: Rivals: ESPN: (90)				
Seth Allen; SG	Woodbridge, Virginia	Fredericksburg Christian School	6 ft 1 in (1.85 m)	190 lb (86 kg)	May 14, 2011
Seth Allen; SG	Recruit ratings: Scout: Rivals: ESPN: (89)				
Sam Cassell, Jr. SG	Baltimore, Maryland	Notre Dame Prep	6 ft 3 in (1.91 m)	180 lb (82 kg)	Apr 21, 2012
Sam Cassell, Jr. SG	Recruit ratings: Scout: Rivals: ESPN: (90)				
Overall recruit ranking: Scout: 16 Rivals: 14 ESPN: 18
Note: In many cases, Scout, Rivals, 247Sports, On3, and ESPN may conflict in their listings of height and weight.; In these cases, the average was taken. ESPN grades are on a 100-point scale.; Sources: "2012 Team Ranking". Rivals.

== Roster ==
2012–13 Maryland Terrapins men's basketball team
Players
Coaches

Pos.	#	Name	Height	Weight	Year	Hometown
PF	0	Charles Mitchell	6 ft 8 in (2.03 m)	260 lb (118 kg)	Fr	Atlanta, Georgia
PF	1	Evan Smotrycz (redshirt)	6 ft 9 in (2.06 m)	235 lb (107 kg)	Jr	Reading, Massachusetts
G	4	Jacob Susskind (W)	6 ft 5 in (1.96 m)	180 lb (82 kg)	So	West Orange, New Jersey
SG	5	Nick Faust	6 ft 6 in (1.98 m)	175 lb (79 kg)	So	Baltimore, Maryland
SF	10	Jake Layman	6 ft 8 in (2.03 m)	190 lb (86 kg)	Fr	Wrentham, Massachusetts
F	15	Spencer Barks (W)	6 ft 9 in (2.06 m)	225 lb (102 kg)	So	Poolesville, Maryland
PG	21	Pe'Shon Howard (C)	6 ft 3 in (1.91 m)	185 lb (84 kg)	Jr	Los Angeles, California
F	23	John Auslander (injured) (W)	6 ft 7 in (2.01 m)	225 lb (102 kg)	Jr	Herndon, Virginia
C	25	Alex Len	7 ft 1 in (2.16 m)	240 lb (109 kg)	So	Antratsit, Ukraine
PF	35	James Padgett (C)	6 ft 8 in (2.03 m)	225 lb (102 kg)	Sr	Brooklyn, New York
G	2	Logan Aronhalt	6 ft 3 in (1.91 m)	210 lb (95 kg)	Sr	Zanesville, Ohio
G	4	Seth Allen	6 ft 1 in (1.85 m)	190 lb (86 kg)	Fr	Woodbridge, Virginia
C	44	Shaquille Cleare	6 ft 9 in (2.06 m)	270 lb (122 kg)	Fr	Andros, Bahamas
G	12	Conner Lipinski (W)	5 ft 10 in (1.78 m)	155 lb (70 kg)	Fr	Gambrills, Maryland
G/F	32	Dez Wells	6 ft 5 in (1.96 m)	215 lb (98 kg)	So	Raleigh, North Carolina
G	11	Varun Ram (W) (redshirt)	5 ft 9 in (1.75 m)	150 lb (68 kg)	So	Clarksville, Maryland

Head coach

- Mark Turgeon (Kansas)

Assistant coach(es)

- Dalonte Hill (Bowie State)
- Bino Ranson (SNHU)
- Scott Spinelli (Boston University)

Legend

- (C) Team captain
- (S) Suspended
- (I) Ineligible
- (W) Walk-on
- Injured
- Current redshirt

Roster
Last update: 10/11/2012

=== Depth chart ===
Pos.	Starting 5	Bench 1	Bench 2
C	Alex Len	Shaquille Cleare	Kevin Arnold
PF	James Padgett	Charles Mitchell	Spencer Barks
SF	Dez Wells	Jake Layman	John Auslander
SG	Nick Faust	Logan Aronhalt	Jacob Susskind
PG	Pe'Shon Howard	Seth Allen	Conner Lipinski

== Schedule and results ==
Date time, TV	Opponent	Result	Record	High points	High rebounds	High assists	Site (attendance) city, state
Exhibition
November 2, 2012*; 7:00 pm, TerpsTV	Indiana (Pa.)	W 73–61	–	16 – Allen	15 – Mitchell	5 – Allen, Howard	Comcast Center (–); College Park, MD
Non-conference regular season
November 9, 2012*; 8:30 pm, ESPN	vs. No. 3 Kentucky; Barclays Center Classic	L 69–72	0–1	23 – Len	12 – Len	5 – Allen, Howard	Barclays Center (17,732); Brooklyn, NY
November 12, 2012*; 8:00 pm, RSN	Morehead State; Barclays Center Classic	W 67–45	1–1	12 – Faust	9 – Mitchell	7 – Howard	Comcast Center (8,724); College Park, MD
November 16, 2012*; 7:00 pm, ESPN3	Long Island; Barclays Center Classic	W 91–74	2–1	19 – Allen	8 – Wells	13 – Howard	Comcast Center (12,785); College Park, MD
November 20, 2012*; 8:00 pm, RSN	Lafayette; Barclays Center Classic	W 83–74	3–1	16 – Len	8 – Faust, Len	6 – Howard	Comcast Center (10,882); College Park, MD
November 24, 2012*; 7:00 pm, ESPN3	Georgia Southern	W 70–53	4–1	13 – Mitchell	11 – Mitchell	6 – Allen	Comcast Center (10,282); College Park, MD
November 27, 2012*; 9:15 pm, ESPN2	at Northwestern; ACC–Big Ten Challenge	W 77–57	5–1	23 – Wells	13 – Len	6 – Howard	Welsh-Ryan Arena (6,009); Evanston, IL
December 2, 2012*; 2:30 pm, MASN	vs. George Mason; BB&T Classic Basketball Tournament	W 69–62	6–1	25 – Wells	9 – Len	6 – Howard	Verizon Center (10,256); Washington, DC
December 5, 2012*; 7:00 pm, ESPN3	Maryland–Eastern Shore	W 100–68	7–1	17 – Aronhalt	11 – Mitchell	8 – Allen	Comcast Center (9,813); College Park, MD
December 8, 2012*; 2:00 pm, ESPN3	South Carolina State	W 61–46	8–1	13 – Len	8 – Cleare	5 – Allen	Comcast Center (12,052); College Park, MD
December 12, 2012*; 8:00 pm, ESPN3	Monmouth	W 71–38	9–1	16 – Faust	10 – Len	7 – Howard	Comcast Center (9,265); College Park, MD
December 21, 2012*; 8:00 pm, ESPN3	Stony Brook	W 76–69	10–1	19 – Len, Wells	9 – Len	7 – Howard	Comcast Center (10,721); College Park, MD
December 29, 2012*; 12:30 pm, ESPN3	Delaware State	W 79–50	11–1	19 – Mitchell	14 – Mitchell	6 – Howard	Comcast Center (12,389); College Park, MD
January 1, 2013*; 3:00 pm, ESPN3	IUPUI	W 81–63	12–1	13 – Allen	6 – Padgett	4 – Faust, Layman	Comcast Center (8,971); College Park, MD
ACC Regular Season
January 5, 2013; 12:00 pm, ACCN/ESPN3	Virginia Tech	W 94–71	13–1 (1–0)	21 – Allen	9 – Len	6 – Howard	Comcast Center (17,950); College Park, MD
January 9, 2013; 8:00 pm, ACCN/ESPN3	Florida State	L 62–65	13–2 (1–1)	15 – Len	10 – Len	3 – Aronhalt, Wells	Comcast Center (14,157); College Park, MD
January 13, 2013; 8:00 pm, ESPNU	at Miami (FL)	L 47–54	13–3 (1–2)	18 – Wells	9 – Len	2 – Faust	BankUnited Center (5,809); Coral Gables, FL
January 16, 2013; 7:00 pm, ESPN2	No. 14 NC State	W 51–50	14–3 (2–2)	10 – Len	7 – Faust	3 – Faust, Wells	Comcast Center (17,950); College Park, MD
January 19, 2013; 12:00 pm, ESPN	at North Carolina	L 52–62	14–4 (2–3)	21 – Wells	11 – Mitchell	2 – Wells	Dean E. Smith Center (20,865); Chapel Hill, NC
January 22, 2013; 9:00 pm, ESPNU	Boston College	W 64–59	15–4 (3–3)	16 – Len	13 – Len	8 – Wells	Comcast Center (13,941); College Park, MD
January 26, 2013; 1:00 pm, CBS	at No. 1 Duke	L 64–84	15–5 (3–4)	13 – Mitchell, Wells	10 – Len	3 – Faust, Howard	Cameron Indoor Stadium (9,314); Durham, NC
January 30, 2013; 8:00 pm, ACCN/ESPN3	at Florida State	L 71–73	15–6 (3–5)	19 – Wells	5 – Cleare, Faust	3 – Faust, Wells	Donald L. Tucker Center (7,222); Tallahassee, FL
February 2, 2013; 2:00 pm, RSN/ESPN3	Wake Forest	W 86–60	16–6 (4–5)	13 – Aronhalt	9 – Len	4 – Faust, Wells	Comcast Center (16,179); College Park, MD
February 7, 2013; 9:00 pm, ACCN/ESPN3	at Virginia Tech	W 60–55	17–6 (5–5)	14 – Layman	11 – Padgett	5 – Wells	Cassell Coliseum (5,465); Blacksburg, VA
February 10, 2013; 1:00 pm, ACCN/ESPN3	Virginia	L 69–80	17–7 (5–6)	13 – Wells	7 – Len	5 – Allen	Comcast Center (16,895); College Park, MD
February 16, 2013; 6:00 pm, ESPN	No. 2 Duke	W 83–81	18–7 (6–6)	19 – Len	9 – Len	7 – Wells	Comcast Center (17,950); College Park, MD
February 19, 2013; 9:00 pm, ACCN/ESPN3	at Boston College	L 58–69	18–8 (6–7)	26 – Aronhalt	8 – Len	5 – Faust	Conte Forum (4,338); Chestnut Hill, MA
February 23, 2013; 12:00 pm, ESPN2	Clemson	W 72–59	19–8 (7–7)	18 – Faust	8 – Len	7 – Wells	Comcast Center (15,373); College Park, MD
February 27, 2013; 8:00 pm, ACCN	at Georgia Tech	L 68–78	19–9 (7–8)	15 – Wells	9 – Len	4 – Wells	McCamish Pavilion (6,962); Atlanta, GA
March 2, 2013; 12:00 pm, ACCN/ESPN3	at Wake Forest	W 67–57	20–9 (8–8)	23 – Wells	10 – Len	4 – Howard	LJVM Coliseum (14,173); Winston-Salem, NC
March 6, 2013; 7:00 pm, ESPN	North Carolina	L 68–79	20–10 (8–9)	18 – Wells	7 – Len, Padgett	2 – Allen, Howard, Wells	Comcast Center (17,950); College Park, MD
March 10, 2013; 6:00 pm, ESPNU	at Virginia	L 58–61 ^{OT}	20–11 (8–10)	15 – Faust	12 – Wells	2 – Len, Howard	John Paul Jones Arena (11,794); Charlottesville, VA
2013 ACC tournament
March 14, 2013; 7:00 pm, ESPNU	vs. Wake Forest; First Round	W 75–62	21–11	21 – Wells	6 – Faust	4 – Len	Greensboro Coliseum (22,169); Greensboro, NC
March 15, 2013; 7:00 pm, ACCN/ESPN2	vs. No. 2 Duke; Quarterfinals	W 83–74	22–11	30 – Wells	9 – Layman	5 – Allen, Howard	Greensboro Coliseum (22,169); Greensboro, NC
March 16, 2013; 3:45 pm, ACCN/ESPN	vs. North Carolina; Semifinals	L 76–79	22–12	20 – Len	9 – Wells	4 – Wells	Greensboro Coliseum (22,169); Greensboro, NC
2013 NIT
March 19, 2013*; 7:00 pm, ESPN2	Niagara; First Round	W 86–70	23–12	15 – Allen, Aronhalt, Faust	11 – Faust	6 – Howard	Comcast Center (4,053); College Park, MD
March 21, 2013*; 7:00 pm, ESPNU	Denver; Second Round	W 62–52	24–12	19 – Wells	6 – Faust, Mitchell	2 – Faust	Comcast Center (3,982); College Park, MD
March 26, 2013*; 7:30 pm, ESPN	at Alabama; Quarterfinals	W 58–57	25–12	15 – Len	13 – Len	2 – Faust, Layman, Len, Mitchell, Wells	Coleman Coliseum (9,479); Tuscaloosa, AL
April 2, 2013*; 9:30 pm, ESPN2	vs. Iowa; Semifinals	L 60–71	25–13	16 – Len	9 – Len	4 – Howard	Madison Square Garden (10,009); New York City, NY
*Non-conference game. ^{#}Rankings from AP Poll. (#) Tournament seedings in parentheses. All times are in Eastern Time.

== Stats ==
Player	GP	GS	MPG	FG%	3FG%	FT%	RPG	APG	SPG	BPG	PPG
Seth Allen	36	7	22.0	.389	.312	.739	2.2	2.3	1.0	0.1	7.8
Logan Aronhalt	37	2	13.9	.423	.432	.600	1.6	0.4	0.3	0.1	5.9
John Auslander	4	0	4.0	.667	.000	.500	0.5	0.0	0.1	0.0	1.3
Spencer Barks	9	0	1.7	.000	—	.750	0.2	0.0	0.0	0.0	0.3
Shaquille Cleare	36	8	12.1	.580	—	.595	2.8	0.1	0.1	0.2	3.8
Nick Faust	37	31	25.8	.404	.350	.745	3.8	2.6	1.0	0.1	9.3
Pe'Shon Howard	35	23	22.6	.296	.245	.870	2.4	3.6	0.6	0.0	3.3
Jake Layman	37	17	19.7	.396	.302	.694	3.1	1.0	0.5	0.6	5.5
Alex Len	37	36	26.3	.532	.125	.687	7.8	1.0	0.2	1.9	11.8
Conner Lipinski	8	0	1.5	1.000	1.000	.667	0.0	0.1	0.0	0.0	0.9
Charles Mitchell	37	6	15.7	.515	—	.540	5.4	0.4	0.2	0.4	5.5
James Padgett	34	19	15.8	.573	—	.533	3.8	0.5	0.4	0.2	5.4
Jacob Susskind	8	0	1.5	.000	.000	—	0.6	0.0	0.1	0.0	0.0
Dez Wells	37	36	28.6	.531	.343	.708	4.9	3.0	0.9	0.5	13.2
