= 2012–13 North Carolina A&T Aggies men's basketball team =

American college basketball season

2012–13 North Carolina A&T Aggies men's basketball

MEAC tournament champions

NCAA tournament, round of 64
- Conference: Mid-Eastern Athletic Conference
- Record: 20–17 (8–8 MEAC)
- Head coach: Cy Alexander (1st season)
- Assistant coaches: Jay Joyner; Darren Corbett; Odell Witherspoon III
- Home arena: Corbett Sports Center

2012–13 MEAC men's basketball standings
	Conf.				Overall
Team	W		L	PCT	W		L	PCT
Norfolk State	16	–	0	1.000	21	–	12	.636
North Carolina Central	15	–	1	.938	22	–	9	.710
Savannah State	11	–	5	.688	19	–	15	.559
Hampton	11	–	5	.688	14	–	17	.452
Morgan State	10	–	6	.625	17	–	15	.531
North Carolina A&T †	8	–	8	.500	20	–	17	.541
Delaware State	8	–	8	.500	15	–	18	.455
Bethune–Cookman	7	–	9	.438	14	–	20	.412
Florida A&M	5	–	11	.313	8	–	23	.258
Coppin State	5	–	11	.313	8	–	24	.250
Howard	4	–	12	.250	7	–	24	.226
South Carolina State	2	–	14	.125	6	–	24	.200
Maryland Eastern Shore	2	–	14	.125	2	–	26	.071
† 2013 MEAC tournament winner As of March 21, 2013; Rankings from AP Poll

The 2012–13 North Carolina A&T Aggies men's basketball team represented North Carolina Agricultural and Technical State University during the 2012–13 NCAA Division I men's basketball season. The Aggies, led by first year head coach Cy Alexander, played their home games at the Corbett Sports Center and are members of the Mid-Eastern Athletic Conference. They finished the season 20–17, 8–8 in MEAC play to finish in a tie for sixth place. They were champions of the MEAC tournament, winning the championship game over Morgan State, to earn an automatic bid to the 2013 NCAA tournament where they defeated Liberty in the first round, for their first ever NCAA Tournament win, before losing in the second round to Louisville.

== Roster ==
Number	Name	Position	Height	Weight	Year	Hometown
0	Lawrence Smith	Forward	6–5	200	Senior	Bowie, Maryland
1	Adrian Powell	Forward	6–6	188	Senior	Conover, North Carolina
2	Khalid King	Guard	6–2	170	Freshman	Columbus, Ohio
3	Jeremy Underwood	Guard	6–0	185	Junior	Washington, D.C.
4	DaMetrius Upchurch	Forward	6–7	210	Senior	Raleigh, North Carolina
5	Jean Louisme	Guard	6–4	180	Senior	Fort Myers, Florida
10	Shaun Stewart	Guard	6–0	180	Freshman	Monroe, North Carolina
15	Dominique Behohn-Tolly	Forward	6–6	210	Senior	Cameroon
21	R.J. Buck	Guard	6–3	192	Senior	Lusby, Maryland
30	Lamont Middleton	Guard	6–3	205	Junior	Bronx, New York
31	Austin Witter	Forward/Guard	6–8	195	Senior	Princeton Junction, New Jersey
33	Waylan Siverand	Forward	6–7	190	Sophomore	Houston, Texas
34	Bruce Beckford	Forward	6–7	215	Freshman	Silver Spring, Maryland
42	Corvon Butler	Forward	6–6	225	Freshman	Champaign, Illinois

== Schedule ==
Date time, TV	Rank^{#}	Opponent^{#}	Result	Record	Site (attendance) city, state
Exhibition
11/01/2012*; 7:05 pm		Fayetteville State	W 78–47		Corbett Sports Center; Greensboro, NC
11/04/2012*; 5:00 pm		Barber–Scotia	W 101–66		Corbett Sports Center; Greensboro, NC
Regular season
11/09/2012*; 8:00 pm		Greensboro	W 83–52	1–0	Corbett Sports Center (2,950); Greensboro, NC
11/12/2012*; 7:00 pm		Utah Valley	L 55–64	1–1	Corbett Sports Center (947); Greensboro, NC
11/16/2012*; 7:00 pm		at Wright State	L 44–56	1–2	Nutter Center (3,726); Fairborn, OH
11/18/2012*; 2:00 pm, FS Ohio		at No. 24 Cincinnati	L 39–93	1–3	Fifth Third Arena (5,582); Cincinnati, OH
11/20/2012*; 7:00 pm		at Iowa State	L 57–86	1–4	Hilton Coliseum (11,384); Ames, IA
11/23/2012*; 12:30 pm		vs. Campbell; Global Sports Hoops Showcase	W 85–60	2–4	Thomas & Mack Center (N/A); Paradise, NV
11/24/2012*; 4:30 pm		vs. Jacksonville State; Global Sports Hoops Showcase	L 50–54 ^{OT}	2–5	Thomas & Mack Center (N/A); Paradise, NV
11/28/2012*; 7:00 pm		at UNC Greensboro; Battle of Market Street	W 90–79	3–5	Greensboro Coliseum (3,130); Greensboro, NC
12/01/2012; 4:00 pm		North Carolina Central	L 62–66	3–6 (0–1)	Corbett Sports Center (5,032); Greensboro, NC
12/13/2012*; 7:30 pm		at NJIT	W 76–71	4–6	Fleisher Center (659); Newark, NJ
12/16/2012*; 1:00 pm		at Seton Hall	L 66–77	4–7	Prudential Center (7,575); Newark, NJ
12/19/2012*; 7:00 pm		Eastern Kentucky	W 78–67	5–7	Corbett Sports Center (453); Greensboro, NC
12/28/2012*; 7:00 pm		at Texas Tech	L 74–85	5–8	United Spirit Arena (5,893); Lubbock, TX
12/30/2012*; 7:00 pm		at Cal State Bakersfield	L 52–60	5–9	Rabobank Arena (1,881); Bakersfield, CA
01/02/2013*; 7:00 pm		Radford	W 81–77	6–9	Corbett Sports Center (746); Greensboro, NC
01/05/2013*; 7:00 pm		at Georgia Southern	W 71–65	7–9	Hanner Fieldhouse (1,012); Statesboro, GA
01/12/2013; 4:30 pm		at Bethune-Cookman	L 60–72	7–10 (0–2)	Moore Gymnasium (1,901); Daytona Beach, FL
01/14/2013; 7:30 pm		at Florida A&M	W 68–40	8–10 (1–2)	Teaching Arena (659); Tallahassee, FL
01/19/2013; 4:00 pm		Howard	W 61–37	9–10 (2–2)	Corbett Sports Center (3,189); Greensboro, NC
01/26/2013; 4:00 pm		Morgan State	L 52–55	9–11 (2–3)	Corbett Sports Center (1,610); Greensboro, NC
01/28/2013; 8:00 pm		Coppin State	W 63–62	10–11 (3–3)	Corbett Sports Center (1,981); Greensboro, NC
02/02/2013; 4:00 pm		at Maryland–Eastern Shore	W 46–44	11–11 (4–3)	Hytche Athletic Center (2,189); Princess Anne, MD
02/04/2013; 7:30 pm		at Delaware State	L 44–53	11–12 (4–4)	Memorial Hall (1,356); Dover, DE
02/09/2013; 4:00 pm		Bethune-Cookman	W 65–55	12–12 (5–4)	Corbett Sports Center (1,557); Greensboro, NC
02/11/2013; 8:15 pm		Florida A&M	W 64–56	13–12 (6–4)	Corbett Sports Center (1,839); Greensboro, NC
02/16/2013; 6:15 pm		at South Carolina State	L 70–72	13–13 (6–5)	SHM Memorial Center (1,387); Orangeburg, SC
02/18/2013; 8:00 pm		at Savannah State	L 49–56	13–14 (6–6)	Tiger Arena (1,110); Savannah, GA
02/23/2013; 4:00 pm		at North Carolina Central	L 47–51	13–15 (6–7)	McLendon–McDougald Gymnasium (3,230); Durham, NC
03/02/2013; 4:00 pm		South Carolina State	W 58–35	14–15 (7–7)	Corbett Sports Center (N/A); Greensboro, NC
03/04/2013; 9:00 pm, ESPNU		Savannah State	W 59–57	15–15 (8–7)	Corbett Sports Center (783); Greensboro, NC
03/07/2013; 8:00 pm		at Norfolk State	L 48–55	15–16 (8–8)	Joseph G. Echols Memorial Hall (2,794); Norfolk, VA
2013 MEAC men's basketball tournament
03/12/2013; 6:30 pm		vs. Florida A&M; First Round	W 65–54	16–16	Norfolk Scope (2,591); Norfolk, VA
03/13/2013; 8:45 pm		vs. North Carolina Central; Quarterfinals	W 55–42	17–16	Norfolk Scope (7,543); Norfolk, VA
03/15/2013; 8:30 pm		vs. Delaware State; Semifinals	W 84–78	18–16	Norfolk Scope (N/A); Norfolk, VA
03/16/2013; 5:00 pm, ESPNU		vs. Morgan State; Championship Game	W 57–54	19–16	Norfolk Scope (N/A); Norfolk, VA
2013 NCAA tournament
03/19/2013*; 6:40 pm, truTV	No. 16 MW	vs. (16 MW) Liberty; First Four	W 73–72	20–16	UD Arena (12,027); Dayton, OH
03/21/2013*; 6:50 pm, TBS	No. 16 MW	vs. No. 2 (1 MW) Louisville; Second Round	L 48–79	20–17	Rupp Arena (23,500); Lexington, KY
*Non-conference game. ^{#}Rankings from AP Poll. (#) Tournament seedings in parentheses. All times are in Eastern Time. (#) during NCAA Tournament is seed with Region MW=Midwest.
