= 2012–13 Hampton Pirates basketball team =

American college basketball season

2012–13 Hampton Pirates men's basketball
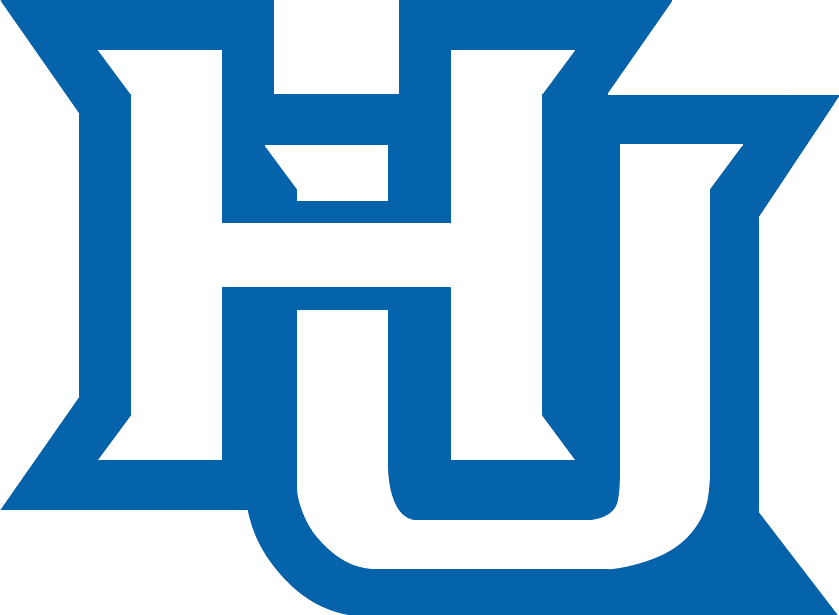
- Conference: Mid-Eastern Athletic Conference
- Record: 14–17 (11–5 MEAC)
- Head coach: Edward Joyner (4th season)
- Assistant coaches: Darryl Sharp; Akeem Miskdeen; DeMarco Johnson
- Home arena: Hampton Convocation Center

2012–13 MEAC men's basketball standings
| | Conf. | | | | Overall |
| Team | W | | L | PCT | W | | L | PCT |
|---|---|---|---|---|---|---|---|---|
| Norfolk State | 16 | – | 0 | 1.000 | 21 | – | 12 | .636 |
| North Carolina Central | 15 | – | 1 | .938 | 22 | – | 9 | .710 |
| Savannah State | 11 | – | 5 | .688 | 19 | – | 15 | .559 |
| Hampton | 11 | – | 5 | .688 | 14 | – | 17 | .452 |
| Morgan State | 10 | – | 6 | .625 | 17 | – | 15 | .531 |
| North Carolina A&T † | 8 | – | 8 | .500 | 20 | – | 17 | .541 |
| Delaware State | 8 | – | 8 | .500 | 15 | – | 18 | .455 |
| Bethune–Cookman | 7 | – | 9 | .438 | 14 | – | 20 | .412 |
| Florida A&M | 5 | – | 11 | .313 | 8 | – | 23 | .258 |
| Coppin State | 5 | – | 11 | .313 | 8 | – | 24 | .250 |
| Howard | 4 | – | 12 | .250 | 7 | – | 24 | .226 |
| South Carolina State | 2 | – | 14 | .125 | 6 | – | 24 | .200 |
| Maryland Eastern Shore | 2 | – | 14 | .125 | 2 | – | 26 | .071 |
† 2013 MEAC tournament winner As of March 21, 2013; Rankings from AP Poll

The 2012–13 Hampton Pirates men's basketball team represented Hampton University during the 2012–13 NCAA Division I men's basketball season. The Pirates, led by fourth year head coach Edward Joyner, played their home games at the Hampton Convocation Center and were members of the Mid-Eastern Athletic Conference. They finished the season 14–17, 11–5 in MEAC play to finish in a tie for third place. They lost in the quarterfinals of the MEAC tournament to Delaware State.

== Roster ==
| Number | Name | Position | Height | Weight | Year | Hometown |
|---|---|---|---|---|---|---|
| 2 | Travis McClenny | Guard | 5–9 | 175 | Junior | Portsmouth, Virginia |
| 3 | Jasper Williams | Guard | 6–2 | 185 | Senior | Washington, D.C. |
| 5 | Emmanuel Okoroba | Center | 6–8 | 225 | Sophomore | Garland, Texas |
| 11 | Deron Powers | Guard | 5–11 | 165 | Freshman | Williamsburg, Virginia |
| 14 | Aaron Austin | Guard | 6–3 | 180 | Senior | Newport News, Virginia |
| 15 | Wesley Dunning | Guard/Forward | 6–7 | 210 | Senior | Washington, D.C. |
| 20 | Du'Vaughn Maxwell | Guard/Forward | 6–7 | 215 | Junior | Manhattan, New York |
| 21 | Ke'Ron Brown | Guard | 6–3 | 215 | Freshman | Savannah, Georgia |
| 22 | Miles Jackson | Guard/Forward | 6–5 | 200 | Freshman | Silver Spring, Maryland |
| 23 | Dwight Meikle | Guard | 6–7 | 210 | Freshman | Jonesboro, Georgia |
| 24 | Ramon Mercado | Guard | 6–4 | 205 | Junior | Hollywood, Florida |
| 25 | Reggie Price | Guard | 6–3 | 195 | Freshman | Charlotte, North Carolina |
| 30 | David Bruce | Center | 6–10 | 235 | Junior | Linden, New Jersey |
| 32 | Dionte Adams | Forward | 6–7 | 215 | Freshman | Charlotte, North Carolina |
| 50 | Oumar Sall | Center | 6–11 | 245 | Freshman | Pikine, Senegal |

== Schedule ==
| Date time, TV | Opponent | Result | Record | Site (attendance) city, state |
Regular season
| 11/09/2012*; 7:30 pm | at William & Mary | L 51–69 | 0–1 | Kaplan Arena (3,351); Williamsburg, Virginia |
| 11/15/2012*; 7:00 pm | at Richmond; Nation of Coaches Classic | L 58–68 | 0–2 | Robins Center (3,857); Richmond, Virginia |
| 11/20/2012*; 7:00 pm | at Ohio; Nation of Coaches Classic | L 67–75 | 0–3 | Convocation Center (4,087); Athens, Ohio |
| 11/23/2012*; 2:00 pm | vs. Wofford; Nation of Coaches Classic | L 51–56 | 0–4 | Trask Coliseum (1,853); Wilmington, North Carolina |
| 11/25/2012*; 2:00 pm | at UNC Wilmington; Nation of Coaches Classic | L 60–61 | 0–5 | Trask Coliseum (2,596); Wilmington, North Carolina |
| 11/28/2012*; 7:00 pm | at Radford | L 54–63 | 0–6 | Dedmon Center (1,723); Radford, Virginia |
| 12/01/2012; 7:00 pm | Howard | W 58–50 | 1–6 (1–0) | Hampton Convocation Center (4,832); Hampton, Virginia |
| 12/08/2012*; 2:00 pm | Robert Morris | L 54–66 | 1–7 | Hampton Convocation Center (1,254); Hampton, Virginia |
| 12/18/2012*; 7:00 pm | American | W 72–65 | 2–7 | Hampton Convocation Center (629); Hampton, Virginia |
| 12/20/2012*; 7:00 pm | Northern Kentucky | L 52–54 | 2–8 | Hampton Convocation Center (326); Hampton, Virginia |
| 12/30/2012*; 2:00 pm | at Winthrop | L 43–50 | 2–9 | Winthrop Coliseum (1,421); Rock Hill, South Carolina |
| 01/02/2013*; 7:30 pm | at USC Upstate | L 49–68 | 2–10 | G. B. Hodge Center (721); Spartanburg, South Carolina |
| 01/07/2013*; 7:00 pm | James Madison | W 69–65 | 3–10 | Hampton Convocation Center (745); Hampton, Virginia |
| 01/12/2013; 4:00 pm | at Howard | W 51–49 | 4–10 (2–0) | Burr Gymnasium (1,134); Washington, D.C. |
| 01/14/2013*; 7:00 pm | Quinnipiac | W 70–64 | 5–10 | Hampton Convocation Center (2,532); Hampton, Virginia |
| 01/19/2013; 6:30 pm | Morgan State | L 78–80 | 5–11 (2–1) | Hampton Convocation Center (4,732); Hampton, Virginia |
| 01/21/2013; 8:00 pm | Coppin State | L 65–67 ^{OT} | 5–12 (2–2) | Hampton Convocation Center (2,954); Hampton, Virginia |
| 01/26/2013; 6:00 pm | at Norfolk State | L 67–74 | 5–13 (2–3) | Joseph G. Echols Memorial Hall (6,191); Norfolk, Virginia |
| 01/30/2013; 7:30 pm | at South Carolina State | W 64–60 | 6–13 (3–3) | SHM Memorial Center (776); Orangeburg, South Carolina |
| 02/02/2013; 4:00 pm | at Morgan State | W 64–62 | 7–13 (4–3) | Talmadge L. Hill Field House (1,120); Baltimore |
| 02/04/2013; 8:15 pm | at Coppin State | W 59–53 | 8–13 (5–3) | Physical Education Complex (402); Baltimore, Maryland |
| 02/07/2013; 7:00 pm | at Savannah State | W 71–68 ^{OT} | 9–13 (6–3) | Tiger Arena (1,077); Savannah, Georgia |
| 02/11/2013; 8:00 pm | Delaware State | W 85–84 ^{2OT} | 10–13 (7–3) | Hampton Convocation Center (3,965); Hampton, Virginia |
| 02/18/2013; 7:00 pm, ESPNU | Norfolk State | L 59–62 | 10–14 (7–4) | Hampton Convocation Center (6,387); Hampton, Virginia |
| 02/20/2013; 7:50 pm | at Maryland–Eastern Shore | W 63–59 | 11–14 (8–4) | Hytche Athletic Center (1,129); Princess Anne, Maryland |
| 02/23/2013*; 2:00 pm | Saint Peter's; BracketBusters | L 59–66 | 11–15 | Hampton Convocation Center (1,643); Hampton, Virginia |
| 02/25/2013; 7:40 pm | at Delaware State | W 57–50 | 12–15 (9–4) | Memorial Hall (1,368); Dover, Delaware |
| 03/02/2013; 6:00 pm | Florida A&M | W 77–68 | 13–15 (10–4) | Hampton Convocation Center (4,243); Hampton, Virginia |
| 03/04/2013; 8:00 pm | Bethune-Cookman | W 75–66 | 14–15 (11–4) | Hampton Convocation Center (2,154); Hampton, Virginia |
| 03/07/2013; 8:00 pm | North Carolina Central | L 64–68 | 14–16 (11–5) | Hampton Convocation Center (3,921); Hampton, Virginia |
2013 MEAC men's basketball tournament
| 03/14/2013; 6:00 pm | vs. Delaware State; Quarterfinals | L 60–63 | 14–17 | Norfolk Scope (N/A); Norfolk, Virginia |
*Non-conference game. ^{#}Rankings from AP Poll. (#) Tournament seedings in parentheses. All times are in Eastern Time.
