= 2012–13 Maryland Eastern Shore Hawks men's basketball team =

American college basketball season

2012–13 Maryland Eastern Shore Hawks men's basketball
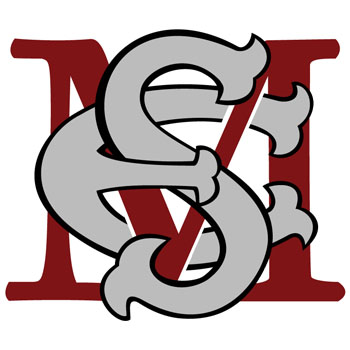
- Conference: Mid-Eastern Athletic Conference
- Record: 2–26 (2–14 MEAC)
- Head coach: Frankie Allen (5th season)
- Assistant coaches: G. Jamal Brown; Curtis Peery; Marlon Terry; Charles Fasnacht
- Home arena: Hytche Athletic Center

2012–13 MEAC men's basketball standings
	Conf.				Overall
Team	W		L	PCT	W		L	PCT
Norfolk State	16	–	0	1.000	21	–	12	.636
North Carolina Central	15	–	1	.938	22	–	9	.710
Savannah State	11	–	5	.688	19	–	15	.559
Hampton	11	–	5	.688	14	–	17	.452
Morgan State	10	–	6	.625	17	–	15	.531
North Carolina A&T †	8	–	8	.500	20	–	17	.541
Delaware State	8	–	8	.500	15	–	18	.455
Bethune–Cookman	7	–	9	.438	14	–	20	.412
Florida A&M	5	–	11	.313	8	–	23	.258
Coppin State	5	–	11	.313	8	–	24	.250
Howard	4	–	12	.250	7	–	24	.226
South Carolina State	2	–	14	.125	6	–	24	.200
Maryland Eastern Shore	2	–	14	.125	2	–	26	.071
† 2013 MEAC tournament winner As of March 21, 2013; Rankings from AP Poll

The 2012–13 Maryland Eastern Shore Hawks men's basketball team represented the University of Maryland Eastern Shore during the 2012–13 NCAA Division I men's basketball season. The Hawks, led by fifth-year head coach Frankie Allen, played their home games at the Hytche Athletic Center in Princess Anne, Maryland and were members of the Mid-Eastern Athletic Conference (MEAC). They finished the season 2–26, 2–14 in MEAC play, to finish in a tie for twelfth place. They lost in the first round of the MEAC tournament to Savannah State.

== Roster ==
Number	Name	Position	Height	Weight	Year	Hometown
0	Dominique Cowell	Guard	5' 7"	190	Sophomore	Hampton, VA
2	Ishaq Pitt	Guard	6' 3"	210	Sophomore	Toronto, ON
5	Lewis Bell	Guard	6' 4"	180	Junior	Washington, D.C.
10	Travis Trim	Guard	6' 0"	195	Freshman	Port of Spain, Trinidad and Tobago
22	Ron Spencer	Center	6' 9"	210	Junior	Sicklerville, NJ
23	Troy Snyder	Forward	6' 6"	215	Junior	Chicago, IL
25	Donald Williams II	Guard	6' 4"	210	Junior	Washington, D.C.
33	Olatunji Kosile	Center	6' 11"	240	Senior	Lagos, Nigeria
44	Pina Guillaume	Forward	6' 9"	220	Senior	N'Djamena, Chad
45	Kyree Jones	Guard	6' 2"	205	Sophomore	Indianapolis, IN
54	Francis Ezeiru	Center	6' 10"	240	Junior	Lagos, Nigeria

== Schedule ==
Date time, TV	Opponent	Result	Record	Site (attendance) city, state
Exhibition
November 5, 2012*; 7:00 p.m.	Salisbury	W 76–66		Hytche Athletic Center (3,002); Princess Anne, MD
Regular season
November 10, 2012*; 1:00 a.m.	at Hawaii; Rainbow Classic	L 64–76	0–1	Stan Sheriff Center (5,674); Honolulu, HI
November 11, 2012*; 8:30 p.m.	vs. Houston Baptist; Rainbow Classic	L 55–70	0–2	Stan Sheriff Center (5,339); Honolulu, HI
November 12, 2012*; 9:00 p.m.	vs. Arkansas–Pine Bluff; Rainbow Classic	L 52–62	0–3	Stan Sheriff Center (5,388); Honolulu, HI
November 16, 2012*; 2:30 p.m.	at South Florida; USF Invitational Tournament	L 59–78	0–4	USF Sun Dome (3,931); Tampa, FL
November 17, 2012*; 5:00 p.m.	vs. Western Michigan; USF Invitational Tournament	L 51–68	0–5	USF Sun Dome (4,014); Tampa, FL
November 18, 2012*; 12:00 p.m.	vs. Loyola–Chicago; USF Invitational Tournament	L 46–62	0–6	USF Sun Dome (3,612); Tampa, FL
December 1, 2012; 3:00 p.m.	at Delaware State	L 66–76	0–7 (0–1)	Memorial Hall (1,528); Dover, DE
December 5, 2012*; 7:00 p.m., ESPN3	at Maryland	L 68–100	0–8	Comcast Center (9,813); College Park, MD
December 8, 2012*; 2:00 p.m., FS Ohio/ESPN3	at No. 11 Cincinnati	L 60–92	0–9	Fifth Third Arena (6,423); Cincinnati, OH
December 17, 2012*; 7:00 p.m., SNY/ESPN3	at Connecticut	L 50–84	0–10	XL Center (8,841); Hartford, CT
December 22, 2012*; 2:00 p.m.	at Ohio	L 57–93	0–11	Convocation Center (4,448); Athens, OH
January 3, 2013*; 7:30 p.m.	at American	L 49–63	0–12	Bender Arena (376); Washington, D.C.
January 12, 2013; 4:40 p.m.	Norfolk State	L 58–63	0–13 (0–2)	Hytche Athletic Center (2,316); Princess Anne, MD
January 19, 2013; 4:25 p.m.	Delaware State	W 58–53	1–13 (1–2)	Hytche Athletic Center (2,018); Princess Anne, MD
January 26, 2013; 6:00 p.m.	at Florida A&M	L 54–55	1–14 (1–3)	Teaching Arena (759); Tallahassee, FL
January 28, 2013; 7:30 p.m.	at Bethune–Cookman	L 57–58	1–15 (1–4)	Moore Gymnasium (1,751); Daytona Beach, FL
February 2, 2013; 4:00 p.m.	North Carolina A&T	L 44–46	1–16 (1–5)	Hytche Athletic Center (2,189); Princess Anne, MD
February 4, 2013; 7:45 p.m.	North Carolina Central	L 54–82	1–17 (1–6)	Hytche Athletic Center (1,310); Princess Anne, MD
February 9, 2013; 4:00 p.m.	at Howard	L 44–63	1–18 (1–7)	Burr Gymnasium (408); Washington, D.C.
February 11, 2013; 8:20 p.m.	at Norfolk State	L 63–85	1–19 (1–8)	Joseph G. Echols Memorial Hall (2,579); Norfolk, VA
February 16, 2013; 4:30 p.m.	Morgan State	L 55–87	1–20 (1–9)	Hytche Athletic Center (5,128); Princess Anne, MD
February 18, 2013; 7:50 p.m.	Coppin State	W 64–62 ^{2OT}	2–20 (2–9)	Hytche Athletic Center (1,214); Princess Anne, MD
February 20, 2013; 7:50 p.m.	Hampton	L 59–63	2–21 (2–10)	Hytche Athletic Center (1,129); Princess Anne, MD
February 25, 2013; 7:55 p.m.	Howard	L 45–49	2–22 (2–11)	Hytche Athletic Center (2,081); Princess Anne, MD
March 2, 2013; 4:00 p.m.	at Morgan State	L 45–58	2–23 (2–12)	Talmadge L. Hill Field House (2,239); Baltimore, MD
March 4, 2013; 8:00 p.m.	at Coppin State	L 60–63	2–24 (2–13)	Physical Education Complex (423); Baltimore, MD
March 7, 2013; 8:30 p.m.	at Savannah State	L 54–71	2–25 (2–14)	Tiger Arena (2,333); Savannah, GA
2013 MEAC men's basketball tournament
March 11, 2013; 6:30 p.m.	vs. Savannah State; First round	L 44–59	2–26	Norfolk Scope (1,562); Norfolk, VA
*Non-conference game. ^{#}Rankings from AP poll. (#) Tournament seedings in parentheses. All times are in Eastern.
