= 2012–13 Savannah State Tigers basketball team =

American college basketball season

2012–13 Savannah State Tigers men's basketball
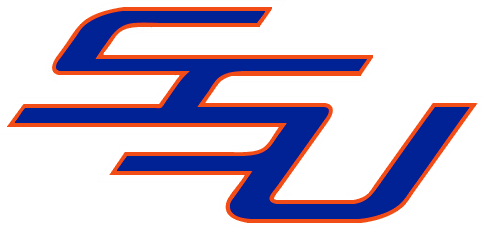

CIT, First Round
- Conference: Mid-Eastern Athletic Conference
- Record: 19–15 (11–5 MEAC)
- Head coach: Horace Broadnax (8th season)
- Assistant coaches: Jay Gibbons; Clyde Wormley
- Home arena: Tiger Arena

2012–13 MEAC men's basketball standings
	Conf.				Overall
Team	W		L	PCT	W		L	PCT
Norfolk State	16	–	0	1.000	21	–	12	.636
North Carolina Central	15	–	1	.938	22	–	9	.710
Savannah State	11	–	5	.688	19	–	15	.559
Hampton	11	–	5	.688	14	–	17	.452
Morgan State	10	–	6	.625	17	–	15	.531
North Carolina A&T †	8	–	8	.500	20	–	17	.541
Delaware State	8	–	8	.500	15	–	18	.455
Bethune–Cookman	7	–	9	.438	14	–	20	.412
Florida A&M	5	–	11	.313	8	–	23	.258
Coppin State	5	–	11	.313	8	–	24	.250
Howard	4	–	12	.250	7	–	24	.226
South Carolina State	2	–	14	.125	6	–	24	.200
Maryland Eastern Shore	2	–	14	.125	2	–	26	.071
† 2013 MEAC tournament winner As of March 21, 2013; Rankings from AP Poll

The 2012–13 Savannah State Tigers basketball team represented Savannah State University during the 2012–13 NCAA Division I men's basketball season. The Tigers, led by eighth year head coach Horace Broadnax, played their home games at Tiger Arena and were members of the Mid-Eastern Athletic Conference.

They finished the season 19–15, 11–5 in MEAC play to finish in a tie for third place. They lost in the quarterfinals of the MEAC tournament to Morgan State. They were invited to the 2013 CIT where they lost in the first round to East Carolina.

== Roster ==
Number	Name	Position	Height	Weight	Year	Hometown
0	Robert Burger	Guard	6–0	180	Junior	Fort Lauderdale, Florida
1	Preston Blackman	Guard	6–0	170	Senior	Hopkins, South Carolina
2	Khiry White	Guard	6–3	180	Junior	Columbus, Georgia
3	Deric Rudolph	Guard	5–1	175	Senior	Gadsden, Alabama
4	Marcus Hutchins	Guard	6–4	180	Senior	Savannah, Georgia
5	Cedric Smith	Guard	6–3	190	Senior	Bronx, New York
10	Patrick Hendley	Guard	6–4	190	Junior	Orange Park, Florida
11	Stephen Wilson	Guard	6–1	160	Junior	Jonesboro, Georgia
12	Joshua Montgomery	Forward	6–4	195	Senior	Smyrna, Georgia
15	Keierre Richards	Guard	6–1	180	Junior	Powder Springs, Georgia
20	Deven Williams	Guard	6–0	205	Junior	Indianapolis, Indiana
22	Rashad Hassan	Forward	6–7	215	Senior	Riverdale, Georgia
23	Christopher Spears	Forward	6–7	220	Junior	Ashburn, Georgia
24	Richard Conner	Guard	6–4	205	Senior	Austell, Georgia
33	Angelo Davis	Guard	6–1	165	Junior	Savannah, Georgia
34	Arnold Lewis	Forward	6–7	205	Senior	Wauchula, Florida
44	Jyles Smith	Forward	6–8	200	Junior	Fairburn, Georgia

== Schedule ==
Date time, TV	Opponent	Result	Record	Site (attendance) city, state
Exhibition
11/01/2012*; 8:00 pm	Armstrong Atlantic State	W 74–57		Tiger Arena (4,350); Savannah, GA
11/05/2012*; 7:00 pm	Fort Valley State	W 79–54		Tiger Arena (2,050); Savannah, GA
Regular season
11/09/2012*; 8:00 pm	Trinity Baptist	W 84–62	1–0	Tiger Arena (1,388); Savannah, GA
11/13/2012*; 7:00 pm	Middle Tennessee; Global Sports Main Event	L 55–58	1–1	Tiger Arena (890); Savannah, GA
11/14/2012*; 7:00 pm	North Florida	W 54–47	2–1	Tiger Arena (1,055); Savannah, GA
11/16/2012*; 7:00 pm	at Alabama State; Global Sports Main Event	W 59–54	3–1	Dunn–Oliver Acadome (1,236); Montgomery, AL
11/18/2012*; 2:00 pm	at UCF; Global Sports Main Event	L 50–53	3–2	UCF Arena (3,894); Orlando, FL
11/20/2012*; 7:00 pm, Sun/FSFL	at No. 7 Florida; Global Sports Main Event	L 40–58	3–3	O'Connell Center (7,323); Gainesville, FL
11/24/2012*; 12:00 pm	Western Illinois	W 39–38	4–3	Tiger Arena (340); Savannah, GA
11/26/2012*; 7:00 pm	Robert Morris	W 61–52	5–3	Tiger Arena (988); Savannah, GA
12/01/2012; 6:00 pm	Norfolk State	L 45–55	5–4 (0–1)	Tiger Arena (1,410); Savannah, GA
12/12/2012*; 7:00 pm	at No. 7 Ohio State	L 45–85	5–5	Value City Arena (13,848); Columbus, OH
12/15/2012*; 2:00 pm, ESPN3	at Marquette	L 51–71	5–6	BMO Harris Bradley Center (13,366); Milwaukee, WI
12/19/2012*; 7:00 pm	at Marshall	L 48–64	5–7	Cam Henderson Center (5,316); Huntington, WV
01/02/2013*; 8:00 pm	at Western Illinois	L 35–39	5–8	Western Hall (1,236); Macomb, IL
01/04/2013*; 8:00 pm	at Saint Louis	L 59–67	5–9	Chaifetz Arena (6,543); Saint Louis, MO
01/08/2013*; 7:00 pm	Allen	W 84–40	6–9	Tiger Arena (1,020); Savannah, GA
01/12/2013; 4:30 pm	at Coppin State	W 56–48	7–9 (1–1)	Physical Education Complex (205); Baltimore, MD
01/14/2013; 7:50 pm	at Morgan State	W 78–70 ^{2OT}	8–9 (2–1)	Talmadge L. Hill Field House (1,079); Baltimore, MD
01/19/2013; 6:00 pm	Florida A&M	W 57–55	9–9 (3–1)	Tiger Arena (1,923); Savannah, GA
01/21/2013; 7:30 pm, ESPNU	Bethune-Cookman	W 43–40	10–9 (4–1)	Tiger Arena (3,852); Savannah, GA
01/26/2013; 6:00 pm	at South Carolina State	W 64–49	11–9 (5–1)	SHM Memorial Center (713); Orangeburg, SC
02/02/2013; 4:00 pm	at Howard	W 52–42	12–9 (6–1)	Burr Gymnasium (556); Washington, D.C.
02/07/2013; 7:00 pm	Hampton	L 68–71 ^{OT}	12–10 (6–2)	Tiger Arena (1,077); Savannah, GA
02/09/2013; 6:00 pm	South Carolina State	W 50–46	13–10 (7–2)	Tiger Arena (989); Savannah, GA
02/14/2013; 6:00 pm	at Florida A&M	W 67–65	14–10 (8–2)	Teaching Gym (567); Tallahassee, FL
02/16/2013; 6:20 pm	North Carolina Central	W 44–36	15–10 (9–2)	Tiger Arena (2,444); Savannah, GA
02/18/2013; 8:00 pm	North Carolina A&T	W 56–49	16–10 (10–2)	Tiger Arena (1,110); Savannah, GA
02/23/2013*; 4:00 pm	at Campbell; BracketBusters	W 69–63	17–10	John W. Pope, Jr. Convocation Center (1,302); Buies Creek, NC
02/25/2013; 7:55 pm	at Bethune-Cookman	L 58–72	17–11 (10–3)	Moore Gymnasium (1,561); Daytona Beach, FL
03/02/2013; 4:00 pm	at North Carolina Central	L 47–51	17–12 (10–4)	McLendon–McDougald Gymnasium (834); Durham, NC
03/04/2013; 9:00 pm, ESPNU	at North Carolina A&T	L 57–59	17–13 (10–5)	Corbett Sports Center (783); Greensboro, NC
03/07/2013; 8:30 pm	Maryland–Eastern Shore	W 71–54	18–13 (11–5)	Tiger Arena (2,333); Savannah, GA
2013 MEAC men's basketball tournament
03/11/2013; 6:30 pm	vs. Maryland–Eastern Shore; First Round	W 59–44	19–13	Norfolk Scope (1,562); Norfolk, VA
03/14/2013; 8:30 pm	vs. Morgan State; Quarterfinals	L 61–64 ^{OT}	19–14	Norfolk Scope (N/A); Norfolk, VA
2013 CIT
03/19/2013*; 7:00 pm	at East Carolina; First Round	L 65–66	19–15	Williams Arena (2,053); Greenville, NC
*Non-conference game. ^{#}Rankings from AP Poll. (#) Tournament seedings in parentheses. All times are in Eastern Time.
