= 2012–13 North Carolina Central Eagles men's basketball team =

American college basketball season

2012–13 North Carolina Central Eagles men's basketball
- Conference: Mid-Eastern Athletic Conference
- Record: 22–9 (15–1 MEAC)
- Head coach: LeVelle Moton (4th season)
- Assistant coaches: John Moseley; Wes Pifer; Donald Thomas
- Home arena: McLendon–McDougald Gymnasium

2012–13 MEAC men's basketball standings
	Conf.				Overall
Team	W		L	PCT	W		L	PCT
Norfolk State	16	–	0	1.000	21	–	12	.636
North Carolina Central	15	–	1	.938	22	–	9	.710
Savannah State	11	–	5	.688	19	–	15	.559
Hampton	11	–	5	.688	14	–	17	.452
Morgan State	10	–	6	.625	17	–	15	.531
North Carolina A&T †	8	–	8	.500	20	–	17	.541
Delaware State	8	–	8	.500	15	–	18	.455
Bethune–Cookman	7	–	9	.438	14	–	20	.412
Florida A&M	5	–	11	.313	8	–	23	.258
Coppin State	5	–	11	.313	8	–	24	.250
Howard	4	–	12	.250	7	–	24	.226
South Carolina State	2	–	14	.125	6	–	24	.200
Maryland Eastern Shore	2	–	14	.125	2	–	26	.071
† 2013 MEAC tournament winner As of March 21, 2013; Rankings from AP Poll

The 2012–13 North Carolina Central Eagles men's basketball team represented North Carolina Central University during the 2012–13 NCAA Division I men's basketball season. The Eagles, led by fourth year head coach LeVelle Moton, played their home games at the McLendon–McDougald Gymnasium and were members of the Mid-Eastern Athletic Conference. They finished the season 22–9, 15–1 in MEAC play to finish in second place. They lost in the quarterfinals of the MEAC tournament to North Carolina A&T. Despite the 22 wins, they did not participate in a postseason tournament.

== Roster ==
Number	Name	Position	Height	Weight	Year	Hometown
0	Drimir Ferguson	Guard	5–9	190	Junior	Bronx, New York
1	Jay Copeland Jr.	Forward	6–7	235	Sophomore	Suffolk, Virginia
3	Juwan Moody	Guard	6–1	175	Freshman	Pontiac, Michigan
4	Jordan Marrow	Guard	6–0	160	Freshman	Cleveland, Ohio
5	Ebuka Anyaorah	Guard	6–4	194	Senior	Suwanee, Georgia
11	Stanton Kidd	Forward	6–7	215	Junior	Baltimore, Maryland
12	Antonin Galaya	Guard	6–5	180	Junior	Saint Martin, France
14	Jeremy Ingram	Guard	6–3	175	Junior	Charlotte, North Carolina
20	Jonathan Nicely	Forward	6–4	194	Senior	Augusta, Georgia
25	DavRon Williams	Forward	6–7	210	Sophomore	Marion, Indiana
32	Emanuel Chapman	Guard	6–1	160	Junior	Raleigh, North Carolina
33	Karamo Jawara	Forward	6–7	215	Sophomore	Bergen, Norway
35	Rashawn King	Guard	5–11	190	Freshman	Raleigh, North Carolina
40	Alfonzo Houston	Guard	6–3	190	Junior	Cleveland Heights, Ohio
55	Ray Willis	Guard	6–6	164	Senior	Atlanta, Georgia

== Schedule ==
Date time, TV	Opponent	Result	Record	Site (attendance) city, state
Regular season
11/10/2012*; 8:00 pm	at Wichita State	L 57–71	0–1	Charles Koch Arena (10,491); Wichita, KS
11/12/2012*; 7:00 pm	Johnson & Wales	W 109–46	1–1	McLendon–McDougald Gymnasium (2,111); Durham, NC
11/14/2012*; 9:00 pm	at Wyoming; Global Hoops Showcase	L 60–73	1–2	Arena-Auditorium (4,463); Laramie, WY
11/15/2012*; 6:30 pm	vs. Southern; Global Hoops Showcase	W 59–55	2–2	Arena-Auditorium (153); Laramie, WY
11/16/2012*; 3:00 pm	vs. South Dakota; Global Hoops Showcase	L 69–81	2–3	Arena-Auditorium (175); Laramie, WY
11/20/2012*; 7:00 pm	Toccoa Falls	W 94–40	3–3	McLendon–McDougald Gymnasium (775); Durham, NC
11/24/2012*; 1:00 pm	Wagner	L 36–38	3–4	McLendon–McDougald Gymnasium (376); Durham, NC
11/27/2012*; 7:00 pm	Utah Valley	W 70–52	4–4	McLendon–McDougald Gymnasium (735); Durham, NC
12/01/2012; 4:00 pm	at North Carolina A&T	W 66–62	5–4 (1–0)	Corbett Sports Center (5,032); Greensboro, NC
12/04/2012*; 7:00 pm	Eastern Kentucky	L 57–63	5–5	McLendon–McDougald Gymnasium (1,170); Durham, NC
12/19/2012*; 8:05 pm	at Drake	L 69–72	5–6	Knapp Center (2,388); Des Moines, IA
12/22/2012*; 6:05 pm, UVU-TV	at Utah Valley	W 73–67	6–6	UCCU Center (548); Orem, UT
12/29/2012*; 2:00 pm, ESPN3	at Marquette	L 66–75	6–7	BMO Harris Bradley Center (13,600); Milwaukee, WI
01/02/2013*; 7:00 pm	at Winthrop	W 64–57	7–7	Winthrop Coliseum (1,010); Rock Hill, SC
01/08/2013*; 7:00 pm	VU–Lynchburg	W 97–28	8–7	McLendon–McDougald Gymnasium (812); Durham, NC
01/12/2013; 6:00 pm	at Florida A&M	W 85–62	9–7 (2–0)	Teaching Gym (825); Tallahassee, FL
01/14/2013; 7:30 pm	at Bethune-Cookman	W 75–66	10–7 (3–0)	Moore Gymnasium (1,801); Daytona Beach, FL
01/21/2013; 7:30 pm	Howard	W 71–36	11–7 (4–0)	McLendon–McDougald Gymnasium (2,297); Durham, NC
01/26/2013; 4:00 pm	Coppin State	W 84–75	12–7 (5–0)	McLendon–McDougald Gymnasium (2,108); Durham, NC
01/28/2013; 7:30 pm	Morgan State	W 69–61	13–7 (6–0)	McLendon–McDougald Gymnasium (2,417); Durham, NC
02/02/2013; 4:00 pm	at Delaware State	W 54–43	14–7 (7–0)	Memorial Hall (1,471); Dover, DE
02/04/2013; 7:45 pm	at Maryland–Eastern Shore	W 82–54	15–7 (8–0)	Hytche Athletic Center (1,310); Princess Anne, MD
02/09/2013; 4:00 pm	Florida A&M	W 51–43	16–7 (9–0)	McLendon–McDougald Gymnasium (1,811); Durham, NC
02/11/2013; 7:30 pm	Bethune-Cookman	W 81–75	17–7 (10–0)	McLendon–McDougald Gymnasium (2,614); Durham, NC
02/16/2013; 6:20 pm	at Savannah State	L 36–44	17–8 (10–1)	Tiger Arena (2,444); Savannah, GA
02/18/2013; 7:45 pm	at South Carolina State	W 71–52	18–8 (11–1)	SHM Memorial Center (1,038); Orangeburg, SC
02/23/2013; 4:00 pm	North Carolina A&T	W 51–47	19–8 (12–1)	McLendon–McDougald Gymnasium (3,230); Durham, NC
03/02/2013; 4:00 pm	Savannah State	W 51–47	20–8 (13–1)	McLendon–McDougald Gymnasium (834); Durham, NC
03/04/2013; 7:45 pm	South Carolina State	W 62–54	21–8 (14–1)	McLendon–McDougald Gymnasium (912); Durham, NC
03/07/2013; 8:00 pm	at Hampton	W 68–64	22–8 (15–1)	Hampton Convocation Center (3,921); Hampton, VA
2013 MEAC men's basketball tournament
03/13/2013; 8:45 pm	vs. North Carolina A&T; Quarterfinals	L 42–55	22–9	Norfolk Scope (7,543); Norfolk, VA
*Non-conference game. ^{#}Rankings from AP Poll. (#) Tournament seedings in parentheses. All times are in Eastern Time.
