= 2012–13 Coppin State Eagles men's basketball team =

American college basketball season

2012–13 Coppin State Eagles men's basketball
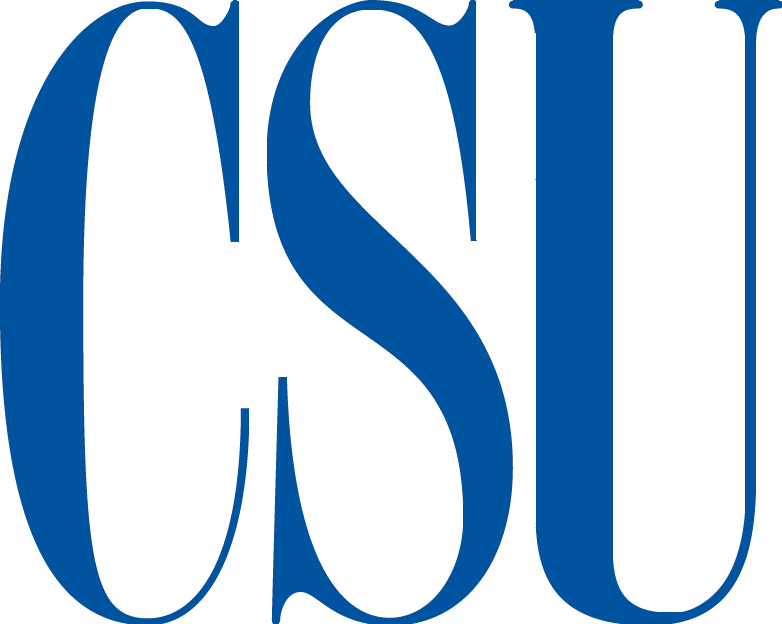
- Conference: Mid-Eastern Athletic Conference
- Record: 8–24 (5–11 MEAC)
- Head coach: Fang Mitchell (27th season)
- Assistant coaches: Keith Johnson; Larry Tucker; Jay Dull
- Home arena: Physical Education Complex

2012–13 MEAC men's basketball standings
	Conf.				Overall
Team	W		L	PCT	W		L	PCT
Norfolk State	16	–	0	1.000	21	–	12	.636
North Carolina Central	15	–	1	.938	22	–	9	.710
Savannah State	11	–	5	.688	19	–	15	.559
Hampton	11	–	5	.688	14	–	17	.452
Morgan State	10	–	6	.625	17	–	15	.531
North Carolina A&T †	8	–	8	.500	20	–	17	.541
Delaware State	8	–	8	.500	15	–	18	.455
Bethune–Cookman	7	–	9	.438	14	–	20	.412
Florida A&M	5	–	11	.313	8	–	23	.258
Coppin State	5	–	11	.313	8	–	24	.250
Howard	4	–	12	.250	7	–	24	.226
South Carolina State	2	–	14	.125	6	–	24	.200
Maryland Eastern Shore	2	–	14	.125	2	–	26	.071
† 2013 MEAC tournament winner As of March 21, 2013; Rankings from AP Poll

The 2012–13 Coppin State Eagles men's basketball team represented Coppin State University during the 2012–13 NCAA Division I men's basketball season. The Eagles, led by 27th year head coach Fang Mitchell, played their home games at the Physical Education Complex and were members of the Mid-Eastern Athletic Conference. They finished the season 8–24, 5–11 in MEAC play to finish in a tie for ninth place. They lost in the first round of the MEAC tournament to Bethune-Cookman.

== Roster ==
Number	Name	Position	Height	Year	Hometown
0	Niwayo Adjei	Guard	6–1	Freshman	Washington, D.C.
1	Patrick Cole	Guard	6–5	Freshman	Newark, New Jersey
2	Sterling Smith	Guard	6–4	Freshman	Chico, California
3	Desma Nicholson	Guard	5–9	Junior	Washington, D.C.
4	Zach Burnham	Forward	6–7	Freshman	Davenport, Iowa
5	Andre Armstrong	Guard	6–3	Junior	Jamaica Queens
11	Taariq Cephas	Guard	5–10	Sophomore	Bear, Delaware
15	Mike Simpson	Guard	6–6	Junior	Sicklerville, New Jersey
21	Michael Murray	Forward	6–5	Junior	Brooklyn, New York
23	Troy Franklin	Guard	5–11	Senior	Baltimore, Maryland
24	Collin Johnson	Guard	6–4	Junior	Sicklerville, New Jersey
34	Charles Iaens	Forward	6–9	Junior	Pflugerville, Texas
35	Darryln Johnson	Forward	6–7	Freshman	Topeka, Kansas
40	Brandon St.Louis	Forward	6–8	Sophomore	Valley Stream, New York

== Schedule ==
Date time, TV	Opponent	Result	Record	Site (attendance) city, state
Regular season
11/09/2012*; 11:00 pm, Pac-12 Los Angeles	at USC; Maui Invitational	L 73–87	0–1	Galen Center (4,157); Los Angeles, CA
11/12/2012*; 8:00 pm, LHN	at Texas; Maui Invitational	L 46–69	0–2	Frank Erwin Center (8,603); Austin, TX
11/17/2012*; 4:30 pm	vs. Florida Atlantic; Maui Invitational	L 61–64	0–3	Alumni Gym (1,107); Elon, NC
11/18/2012*; 2:00 pm	Colgate; Maui Invitational	L 84–88	0–4	Alumni Gym; Elon, NC
11/24/2012*; 4:00 pm	Cheyney	W 98–78	1–4	Physical Education Complex (389); Baltimore, MD
11/28/2012*; 7:30 pm	Loyola (MD)	L 51–67	1–5	Physical Education Complex (2,011); Baltimore, MD
12/01/2012*; 7:30 pm, BTN	at No. 1 Indiana	L 51–87	1–6	Assembly Hall (17,472); Bloomington, IN
12/04/2012*; 7:30 pm	Saint Joseph's	L 55–67	1–7	Physical Education Complex (1,223); Baltimore, MD
12/08/2012*; 7:00 pm	at Marshall	L 63–69	1–8	Cam Henderson Center (5,152); Huntington, WV
12/12/2012*; 7:00 pm	at UMBC	W 80–61	2–8	Retriever Activities Center (1,624); Catonsville, MD
12/15/2012*; 4:00 pm	at Wagner	L 65–77 ^{OT}	2–9	Spiro Sports Center (1,303); Staten Island, NY
12/19/2012*; 7:30 pm	at Towson	W 64–61	3–9	Towson Center (1,018); Towson, MD
12/22/2012*; 1:00 pm, BTN	at Iowa	L 50–80	3–10	Carver-Hawkeye Arena (13,060); Iowa City, IA
12/29/2012*; 2:00 pm, Pac-12 Arizona	at Arizona State	L 52–68	3–11	Wells Fargo Arena (5,623); Tempe, AZ
01/02/2013*; 7:00 pm	at Akron	L 63–91	3–12	James A. Rhodes Arena (2,227); Akron, OH
01/05/2013; 4:00 pm	Howard	L 60–70	3–13 (0–1)	Physical Education Complex (708); Baltimore, MD
01/12/2013; 4:30 pm	Savannah State	L 48–56	3–14 (0–2)	Physical Education Complex (205); Baltimore, MD
01/14/2013; 8:00 pm	South Carolina State	W 79–58	4–14 (1–2)	Physical Education Complex (209); Baltimore, MD
01/19/2013; 6:30 pm	at Norfolk State	L 68–75	4–15 (1–3)	Joseph G. Echols Memorial Hall (4,011); Norfolk, VA
01/21/2013; 8:00 pm	at Hampton	W 67–65 ^{OT}	5–15 (2–3)	Hampton Convocation Center (2,954); Hampton, VA
01/26/2013; 4:00 pm	at North Carolina Central	L 75–84	5–16 (2–4)	McLendon–McDougald Gymnasium (2,108); Durham, NC
01/28/2013; 8:00 pm	at North Carolina A&T	L 62–63	5–17 (2–5)	Corbett Sports Center (1,981); Greensboro, NC
02/02/2013; 4:00 pm	Norfolk State	L 70–80	5–18 (2–6)	Physical Education Complex (3,342); Baltimore, MD
02/04/2013; 8:15 pm	Hampton	L 53–59	5–19 (2–7)	Physical Education Complex (402); Baltimore, MD
02/09/2013; 4:30 pm	Morgan State	L 51–80	5–20 (2–8)	Physical Education Complex (2,516); Baltimore, MD
02/16/2013; 4:30 pm	at Delaware State	L 43–57	5–21 (2–9)	Memorial Hall (1,348); Dover, DE
02/18/2013; 7:50 pm	at Maryland–Eastern Shore	L 62–64 ^{2OT}	5–22 (2–10)	Hytche Athletic Center (1,214); Princess Anne, MD
02/23/2013; 4:00 pm	at Howard	W 63–56	6–22 (3–10)	Burr Gymnasium; Washington, D.C.
02/27/2013; 7:30 pm	at Morgan State	L 68–86	6–23 (3–11)	Talmadge L. Hill Field House (4,789); Baltimore, MD
03/04/2013; 8:00 pm	Maryland–Eastern Shore	W 63–60	7–23 (4–11)	Physical Education Complex (423); Baltimore, MD
03/07/2013; 8:00 pm	Bethune-Cookman	W 69–61	8–23 (5–11)	Physical Education Complex (516); Baltimore, MD
2013 MEAC men's basketball tournament
03/12/2013; 4:00 pm	vs. Bethune-Cookman; First Round	L 78–89	8–24	Norfolk Scope (2,591); Norfolk, VA
*Non-conference game. ^{#}Rankings from AP Poll. (#) Tournament seedings in parentheses. All times are in Eastern Time.
