= 2012–13 South Alabama Jaguars basketball team =

American college basketball season

2012–13 South Alabama Jaguars men's basketball

CIT, First Round
- Conference: Sun Belt Conference
- East Division
- Record: 17–13 (14–6 Sun Belt)
- Head coach: Ronnie Arrow (First 10 games) (14th season)
- Assistant coaches: Jeff Price (Interim head coach remainder of season); Michael Floyd; Dominique Taylor
- Home arena: Mitchell Center

2012–13 Sun Belt Conference men's basketball standings
	Conf.				Overall
Team	W		L	PCT	W		L	PCT
East
Middle Tennessee	19	–	1	.950	28	–	6	.824
South Alabama	14	–	6	.700	17	–	13	.567
FIU	11	–	9	.550	18	–	14	.563
WKU †	10	–	10	.500	20	–	16	.556
Florida Atlantic	9	–	11	.450	14	–	18	.438
Troy	6	–	14	.300	12	–	21	.364
West
Arkansas State	12	–	8	.600	19	–	12	.613
Arkansas–Little Rock	11	–	9	.550	17	–	15	.531
Louisiana–Lafayette	8	–	12	.400	13	–	20	.394
North Texas	7	–	13	.350	12	–	20	.375
Louisiana–Monroe	3	–	17	.150	4	–	23	.148
† 2013 Sun Belt Tournament winner As of March 22, 2013; Rankings from AP Poll

The 2012–13 South Alabama Jaguars basketball team represented the University of South Alabama during the 2012–13 NCAA Division I men's basketball season. The Jaguars were led by head coach Ronnie Arrow, in his sixth year of his second stint as head coach and 13th year overall, for the first 10 games until his abrupt resignation. They were led by interim head coach Jeff Price the remainder of the season. They played their home games at the Mitchell Center, and were members of the East Division of the Sun Belt Conference. They finished the season 17–13, 14–6 in Sun Belt play to finish in second place in the East Division. They lost in the quarterfinals of the Sun Belt tournament to WKU. They were invited to the 2013 CIT where they lost in the first round to Tulane.

== Roster ==
Number	Name	Position	Height	Weight	Year	Hometown
0	Trey Anderson	Guard	6–4	190	Senior	Carrollton, Texas
2	Dre Connor	Guard	6–0	180	Junior	Lauderhill, Florida
3	Xavier Roberson	Guard	6–1	195	Junior	Houston, Texas
4	Barrington Stevens III	Guard	5–10	190	Freshman	Allen, Texas
5	Gregoryshon Magee	Forward	6–9	195	Junior	New Orleans, Louisiana
10	Wendell Wright	Guard	6–6	205	Senior	Long Beach, California
11	Freddie Goldstein	Guard	5–10	160	Senior	Milwaukee, Wisconsin
12	Antoine Allen	Guard	6–1	180	Junior	Baltimore, Maryland
13	Mychal Ammons	Guard	6–6	225	Sophomore	Vicksburg, Mississippi
21	Augustine Rubit	Forward	6–7	230	Junior	Houston, Texas
31	Viktor Juricek	Forward	6–10	210	Freshman	Prievidza, Slovakia
32	Javier Carter	Forward	6–7	225	Senior	Dallas, Texas
	Dionte Ferguson	Guard	6–5	220	Junior	Prattville, Alabama
	Jeremy Jones	Guard	6–2	166	Senior	Chicago, Illinois

== Schedule ==
Date time, TV	Opponent	Result	Record	Site (attendance) city, state
Canada Tour
08/13/2012*; 6:00 pm	at Windsor	L 80–82 ^{OT}		St. Denis Centre (400); Windsor, Ontario
08/14/2012*; 6:00 pm	at Western Ontario	W 68–47		Alumni Hall (N/A); London, Ontario
08/16/2012*; 6:00 pm	at Windsor	W 92–70		St. Denis Centre (500); Windsor, Ontario
Exhibition
11/05/2012*; 7:00 pm	Spring Hill	W 73–40		Mitchell Center (1,825); Mobile, AL
Regular season
11/09/2012*; 6:00 pm	at No. 25 Florida State; Coaches Vs. Cancer Classic	W 76–71	1–0	Donald L. Tucker Center (9,070); Tallahassee, FL
11/14/2012*; 7:00 pm	William Carey	W 82–64	2–0	Mitchell Center (2,861); Mobile, AL
11/19/2012*; 3:00 pm	vs. Tennessee State; Coaches Vs. Cancer Classic	L 57–68	2–1	GSU Sports Arena (339); Atlanta, GA
11/20/2012*; 3:00 pm	vs. Monmouth; Coaches Vs. Cancer Classic	L 71–73	2–2	GSU Sports Arena (336); Atlanta, GA
11/21/2012*; 2:00 pm	at Georgia State; Coaches Vs. Cancer Classic	L 73–75	2–3	GSU Sports Arena (1,028); Atlanta, GA
11/29/2012; 6:00 pm	at Florida Atlantic	W 77–66	3–3 (1–0)	FAU Arena (1,337); Boca Raton, FL
12/01/2012; 6:30 pm	at FIU	W 79–68	4–3 (2–0)	U.S. Century Bank Arena (920); Miami, FL
12/04/2012*; 7:00 pm	New Mexico State	L 52–58	4–4	Mitchell Center (2,067); Mobile, AL
12/08/2012*; 7:00 pm	at UAB	L 78–92	4–5	Bartow Arena (3,755); Birmingham, AL
12/16/2012*; 4:05 pm	Texas A&M–Corpus Christi	W 74–69	5–5	Mitchell Center (1,764); Mobile, AL
12/22/2012; 2:05 pm	Arkansas–Little Rock	W 77–62	6–5 (3–0)	Mitchell Center (1,875); Mobile, AL
12/29/2012; 7:20 pm	Arkansas State	L 54–63	6–6 (3–1)	Mitchell Center (2,545); Mobile, AL
01/03/2013; 7:30 pm	at Louisiana–Monroe	W 77–72	7–6 (4–1)	Fant–Ewing Coliseum (988); Monroe, LA
01/05/2013; 7:20 pm	Middle Tennessee	L 56–60	7–7 (4–2)	Mitchell Center (2,602); Mobile, AL
01/10/2013; 7:00 pm	at Louisiana–Lafayette	W 91–89 ^{2OT}	8–7 (5–2)	Cajundome (2,037); Lafayette, LA
01/12/2013; 7:15 pm	at North Texas	L 56–66	8–8 (5–3)	The Super Pit (3,642); Denton, TX
01/17/2013; 7:05 pm	Louisiana–Monroe	W 71–56	9–8 (6–3)	Mitchell Center (2,045); Mobile, AL
01/24/2013; 7:05 pm, ESPN3	WKU	W 65–57	10–8 (7–3)	Mitchell Center (2,335); Mobile, AL
01/27/2013; 4:05 pm	FIU	W 60–58	11–8 (8–3)	Mitchell Center (2,147); Mobile, AL
01/31/2013; 7:05 pm	at Arkansas State	L 62–74	11–9 (8–4)	Convocation Center (2,862); Jonesboro, AR
02/02/2013; 7:00 pm	at Arkansas–Little Rock	W 70–66	12–9 (9–4)	Jack Stephens Center (3,935); Little Rock, AR
02/07/2013; 7:05 pm	Troy	W 65–62	13–9 (10–4)	Mitchell Center (2,358); Mobile, AL
02/09/2013; 7:30 pm, ESPN3	Florida Atlantic	W 72–71	14–9 (11–4)	Mitchell Center (4,271); Mobile, AL
02/14/2013; 7:05 pm	Louisiana–Lafayette	W 88–64	15–9 (12–4)	Mitchell Center (1,726); Mobile, AL
02/21/2013; 7:00 pm, ESPN3	at Middle Tennessee	L 50–85	15–10 (12–5)	Murphy Center (5,712); Murfreesboro, TN
02/23/2013; 7:00 pm	North Texas	W 69–57	16–10 (13–5)	Mitchell Center (4,001); Mobile, AL
02/28/2013; 7:00 pm, ESPN3	at WKU	L 73–79	16–11 (13–6)	E. A. Diddle Arena (4,024); Bowling Green, KY
03/02/2013; 7:30 pm	at Troy	W 53–49	17–11 (14–6)	Trojan Arena (3,219); Troy, AL
2013 Sun Belt Conference men's basketball tournament
03/09/2013; 8:30 pm	vs. WKU; Quarterfinals	L 59–62	17–12	Convention Center Court (N/A); Hot Springs, AR
2013 CIT
03/20/2013*; 7:00 pm	at Tulane; First Round	L 73–84	17–13	Devlin Fieldhouse (1,682); New Orleans, LA
*Non-conference game. ^{#}Rankings from AP Poll. (#) Tournament seedings in parentheses. All times are in Central Time.
