= 2012–13 Troy Trojans men's basketball team =

American college basketball season

2012–13 Troy Trojans men's basketball
- Conference: Sun Belt Conference
- East Division
- Record: 12–21 (6–14 Sun Belt)
- Head coach: Don Maestri (31st season)
- Assistant coaches: David Felix; Michael Curry; Ben Fletcher
- Home arena: Trojan Arena

2012–13 Sun Belt Conference men's basketball standings
	Conf.				Overall
Team	W		L	PCT	W		L	PCT
East
Middle Tennessee	19	–	1	.950	28	–	6	.824
South Alabama	14	–	6	.700	17	–	13	.567
FIU	11	–	9	.550	18	–	14	.563
WKU †	10	–	10	.500	20	–	16	.556
Florida Atlantic	9	–	11	.450	14	–	18	.438
Troy	6	–	14	.300	12	–	21	.364
West
Arkansas State	12	–	8	.600	19	–	12	.613
Arkansas–Little Rock	11	–	9	.550	17	–	15	.531
Louisiana–Lafayette	8	–	12	.400	13	–	20	.394
North Texas	7	–	13	.350	12	–	20	.375
Louisiana–Monroe	3	–	17	.150	4	–	23	.148
† 2013 Sun Belt Tournament winner As of March 22, 2013; Rankings from AP Poll

The 2012–13 Troy Trojans men's basketball team represented Troy University during the 2012–13 NCAA Division I men's basketball season. The Trojans, led by 31st year head coach Don Maestri, played their home games at Trojan Arena and were members of the East Division of the Sun Belt Conference. They finished the season 12–21, 6–14 in Sun Belt play to finish in last place in the East Division. They lost in the quarterfinals of the Sun Belt tournament to Arkansas State.

== Roster ==
Number	Name	Position	Height	Weight	Year	Hometown
0	R.J. Scott	Guard	6–4	200	Junior	Slidell, Louisiana
1	Antoine Myers	Guard	6–3	187	Junior	Baltimore, Maryland
2	Jarrett Calhoun	Guard	6–1	170	Sophomore	Linden, New Jersey
3	Jeff Mullahey	Guard	6–3	180	Junior	Pace, Florida
5	Justin Wright	Guard	6–5	220	Senior	Pace, Florida
10	Emil Jones	Guard	6–3	185	Senior	Hattiesburg, Mississippi
11	Hunter Williams	Guard	6–0	175	Junior	Ocala, Florida
15	Deonata Jethroe	Guard	6–4	220	Sophomore	Columbus, Mississippi
22	Tevin Calhoun	Forward	6–7	205	Junior	Linden, New Jersey
30	Mike Kelly	Forward	6–6	205	Freshman	Bainbridge, Georgia
32	Josh Warren	Center	6–9	212	Junior	Orlando, Florida
33	Westley Hinton	Forward	6–8	190	Junior	Lawrenceville, Georgia
34	Ray Chambers	Forward	6–6	220	Senior	Cincinnati, Ohio
41	Sidki Muwallif	Forward	6–8	190	Freshman	Stockbridge, Georgia
42	Breon Dixon	Forward	6–7	195	Freshman	Ashburn, Georgia

== Schedule ==
Date time, TV	Opponent	Result	Record	Site (attendance) city, state
Exhibition
11/05/2012*; 7:00 pm	Alaska Anchorage	W 61–57		Trojan Arena; Troy, Alabama
Regular season
11/09/2012*; 7:00 pm	Mississippi State	W 56–53	1–0	Trojan Arena (5,120); Troy, Alabama
11/12/2012*; 7:00 pm	at Texas A&M; CBE Hall of Fame Classic	L 65–83	1–1	Reed Arena (4,330); College Station, Texas
11/18/2012*; 4:30 pm	vs. Louisiana Tech; CBE Hall of Fame Classic	L 46–70	1–2	McKenzie Arena (N/A); Chattanooga, Tennessee
11/19/2012*; 6:00 pm	at Chattanooga; CBE Hall of Fame Classic	W 68–61	2–2	McKenzie Arena (2,457); Chattanooga, Tennessee
11/20/2012*; 3:30 pm	vs. Southeast Missouri State; CBE Hall of Fame Classic	W 59–56	3–2	McKenzie Arena (2,395); Chattanooga, Tennessee
11/25/2012*; 2:00 pm	Alabama State	W 66–62	4–2	Trojan Arena (767); Troy, Alabama
11/27/2012*; 7:00 pm	UAB	L 55–75	4–3	Trojan Arena (2,576); Troy, Alabama
11/29/2012; 7:30 pm	at Arkansas–Little Rock	L 56–58	4–4 (0–1)	Jack Stephens Center (3,492); Little Rock, Arkansas
12/01/2012; 7:30 pm, ESPN3	WKU	L 71–75	4–5 (0–2)	Trojan Arena (1,121); Troy, Alabama
12/08/2012*; 7:00 pm	Utah Valley	L 82–86 ^{2OT}	4–6	Trojan Arena (1,256); Troy, Alabama
12/13/2012*; 7:30 pm	at Alabama State	L 68–74	4–7	Dunn–Oliver Acadome (N/A); Montgomery, Alabama
12/15/2012*; 7:00 pm	Georgia State	W 57–56	5–7	Trojan Arena (1,212); Troy, Alabama
12/19/2012*; 8:05 pm	at Utah Valley	L 64–67 ^{OT}	5–8	UCCU Center (1,009); Orem, Utah
12/27/2012; 7:00 pm	Florida Atlantic	L 54–61	5–9 (0–3)	Trojan Arena (1,139); Troy, Alabama
01/03/2013; 7:00 pm	at North Texas	L 59–76	5–10 (0–4)	The Super Pit (2,338); Denton, Texas
01/05/2013; 7:30 pm	Arkansas–Little Rock	W 67–64	6–10 (1–4)	Trojan Arena (1,673); Troy, Alabama
01/10/2013; 6:00 pm, ESPN3	Louisiana–Monroe	W 64–55	7–10 (2–4)	Trojan Arena (1,416); Troy, Alabama
01/17/2013; 6:00 pm	at Florida Atlantic	L 59–80	7–11 (2–5)	FAU Arena (1,543); Boca Raton, Florida
01/19/2013; 7:00 pm	at FIU	L 55–61	7–12 (2–6)	U.S. Century Bank Arena (1,063); Miami, Florida
01/24/2013; 7:30 pm	Arkansas State	W 74–67 ^{OT}	8–12 (3–6)	Trojan Arena (1,743); Troy, Alabama
01/26/2013; 4:15 pm	at Louisiana–Monroe	W 71–64 ^{OT}	9–12 (4–6)	Fant–Ewing Coliseum (2,471); Monroe, Louisiana
01/31/2013; 7:00 pm, ESPN3	at WKU	L 61–65	9–13 (4–7)	E. A. Diddle Arena (4,244); Bowling Green, Kentucky
02/02/2013; 7:30 pm	Louisiana–Lafayette	W 71–52	10–13 (5–7)	Trojan Arena (2,753); Troy, Alabama
02/07/2013; 7:05 pm	at South Alabama	L 62–65	10–14 (5–8)	Mitchell Center (2,358); Mobile, Alabama
02/09/2013; 5:00 pm	at Middle Tennessee	L 41–93	10–15 (5–9)	Murphy Center (3,942); Murfreesboro, Tennessee
02/14/2013; 7:30 pm	FIU	W 69–61	11–15 (6–9)	Trojan Arena (1,563); Troy, Alabama
02/16/2013; 7:30 pm, ESPN3	North Texas	L 61–63	11–16 (6–10)	Trojan Arena (1,954); Troy, Alabama
02/21/2013; 7:00 pm	at Louisiana–Lafayette	L 66–76	11–17 (6–11)	Cajundome (1,919); Lafayette, Louisiana
02/23/2013; 7:05 pm	at Arkansas State	L 50–58	11–18 (6–12)	Convocation Center (5,268); Jonesboro, Arkansas
02/28/2013; 7:30 pm	Middle Tennessee	L 56–66	11–19 (6–13)	Trojan Arena (1,674); Troy, Alabama
03/02/2013; 7:30 pm	South Alabama	L 49–53	11–20 (6–14)	Trojan Arena (3,219); Troy, Alabama
2013 Sun Belt tournament
03/08/2013; 8:30 pm	vs. Florida Atlantic; First Round	W 81–79 ^{OT}	12–20	Summit Arena (N/A); Hot Springs, Arkansas
03/09/2013; 9:30 pm, ESPN3	vs. Arkansas State; Quarterfinals	L 63–68 ^{OT}	12–21	Summit Arena (N/A); Hot Springs, Arkansas
*Non-conference game. ^{#}Rankings from AP Poll. (#) Tournament seedings in parentheses. All times are in Central Time.
