= 2013 Sun Belt Conference men's basketball tournament =

Basketball Tournament

- Classification: Division I
- Season: 2012–13
- Teams: 11
- Site: Summit Arena; Convention Center Court; Hot Springs, Arkansas
- Champions: Western Kentucky (9th title)
- Winning coach: Ray Harper (2nd title)
- MVP: T. J. Price (Western Kentucky)
- Television: Sun Belt Network, ESPN

2012–13 Sun Belt Conference men's basketball standings
	Conf.				Overall
Team	W		L	PCT	W		L	PCT
East
Middle Tennessee	19	–	1	.950	28	–	6	.824
South Alabama	14	–	6	.700	17	–	13	.567
FIU	11	–	9	.550	18	–	14	.563
WKU †	10	–	10	.500	20	–	16	.556
Florida Atlantic	9	–	11	.450	14	–	18	.438
Troy	6	–	14	.300	12	–	21	.364
West
Arkansas State	12	–	8	.600	19	–	12	.613
Arkansas–Little Rock	11	–	9	.550	17	–	15	.531
Louisiana–Lafayette	8	–	12	.400	13	–	20	.394
North Texas	7	–	13	.350	12	–	20	.375
Louisiana–Monroe	3	–	17	.150	4	–	23	.148
† 2013 Sun Belt Tournament winner As of March 22, 2013; Rankings from AP Poll

The 2013 Sun Belt Conference men's basketball tournament was held in Hot Springs, Arkansas from March 8 to March 11 at the Summit Arena and the Convention Center Court. The tournament winner received an automatic bid to the 2013 NCAA tournament. The semifinals games were televised on the Sun Belt Network, with the championship game aired on ESPN, on Monday March 11.

== Bracket ==
First round Friday March 8
8	Louisiana–Lafayette	74
9	North Texas	55
6	WKU	74
11	Louisiana–Monroe	60
7	Florida Atlantic	79
10	Troy	81^{OT}

Quarterfinals; Saturday, March 9
1	Middle Tennessee	81
8	Louisiana–Lafayette	66
4	FIU	69
5	Arkansas–Little Rock	54
3	South Alabama	59
6	WKU	62
2	Arkansas State	68^{OT}
10	Troy	63

Semifinals; Sunday March 10; Sun Belt Network
1	Middle Tennessee	57
4	FIU	61
6	WKU	58
2	Arkansas State	56

Championship; Monday, March 11; ESPN
4	FIU	63
6	WKU	65
