= 2012–13 Florida Atlantic Owls men's basketball team =

American college basketball season

2012–13 Florida Atlantic Owls men's basketball
- Conference: Sun Belt Conference
- East Division
- Record: 14–18 (9–11 Sun Belt)
- Head coach: Mike Jarvis (5th season)
- Assistant coaches: Mike Jarvis II; Tim Kaine; Peter Gash
- Home arena: FAU Arena

2012–13 Sun Belt Conference men's basketball standings
	Conf.				Overall
Team	W		L	PCT	W		L	PCT
East
Middle Tennessee	19	–	1	.950	28	–	6	.824
South Alabama	14	–	6	.700	17	–	13	.567
FIU	11	–	9	.550	18	–	14	.563
WKU †	10	–	10	.500	20	–	16	.556
Florida Atlantic	9	–	11	.450	14	–	18	.438
Troy	6	–	14	.300	12	–	21	.364
West
Arkansas State	12	–	8	.600	19	–	12	.613
Arkansas–Little Rock	11	–	9	.550	17	–	15	.531
Louisiana–Lafayette	8	–	12	.400	13	–	20	.394
North Texas	7	–	13	.350	12	–	20	.375
Louisiana–Monroe	3	–	17	.150	4	–	23	.148
† 2013 Sun Belt Tournament winner As of March 22, 2013; Rankings from AP Poll

The 2012–13 Florida Atlantic Owls men's basketball team represented Florida Atlantic University during the 2012–13 NCAA Division I men's basketball season. The Owls, led by fifth year head coach Mike Jarvis, played their home games at the FAU Arena, and were members of the East Division of the Sun Belt Conference. They finished the season 14–18, 9–11 in Sun Belt play to finish in fifth place in the East Division. They lost in the first round of the Sun Belt tournament to Troy.

This was the Owls final season as a member of the Sun Belt. In July, 2013, they will join Conference USA.

== Roster ==
Number	Name	Position	Height	Weight	Year	Hometown
1	Cavon Baker	Guard	6–1	170	Freshman	Miami, Florida
2	DeVonte Thornton	Forward	6–8	185	Freshman	Marietta, Georgia
3	Dragan Sekelja	Center	7–0	255	Junior	Zagreb, Croatia
4	Andre Mattison	Forward	6–7	220	Senior	Washington, D.C.
5	Javier Lacunza	Forward	6–8	205	Freshman	Pamplona, Spain
11	Justin Raffington	Center	6–9	245	Junior	Freiburg, Germany
12	Jackson Trapp	Guard	6–4	195	Freshman	Orlando, Florida
20	Austin Hunt	Guard	6–2	162	Freshman	Miami, Florida
21	Jordan McCoy	Forward	6–6	185	Senior	Orlando, Florida
22	Greg Gantt	Guard	6–2	205	Senior	Gainesville, Florida
24	Chris Bryant	Forward	6–8	210	Freshman	Tallahassee, Florida
25	Pablo Bertone	Guard	6–4	198	Junior	Arroyito, Argentina
42	Stefan Moody	Guard	5–10	170	Freshman	Kissimmee, Florida
44	Kelvin Penn	Forward	6–6	225	Sophomore	Steilacoom, Washington

== Schedule ==
Date time, TV	Opponent	Result	Record	Site (attendance) city, state
Exhibition
11/05/2012*; 7:00 pm	Lynn	W 87–80		FAU Arena; Boca Raton, Florida
Regular season
11/11/2012*; 2:30 pm, ESPNU	at No. 11 North Carolina; Maui Invitational	L 56–80	0–1	Dean Smith Center (15,403); Chapel Hill, NC
11/13/2012*; 8:00 pm	at Mississippi State; Maui Invitational	L 58–78	0–2	The Hump (6,140); Starkville, MS
11/17/2012*; 4:30 pm	vs. Coppin State; Maui Invitational	W 64–61	1–2	Alumni Gym (1,107); Elon, NC
11/18/2012*; 4:30 P;	vs. Elon; Maui Invitational	L 59–62 ^{OT}	1–3	Alumni Gym (908); Elon, NC
11/24/2012*; 1:00 pm	American	W 56–55	2–3	FAU Arena (1,257); Boca Raton, Florida
11/29/2012; 7:00 pm	South Alabama	L 66–77	2–4 (0–1)	FAU Arena (1,337); Boca Raton, Florida
12/01/2012; 8:00 pm	Arkansas State	W 72–65	3–4 (1–1)	FAU Arena (1,321); Boca Raton, Florida
12/06/2012*; 7:00 pm	at Stetson	W 88–78	4–4	Edmunds Center (917); DeLand, FL
12/09/2012*; 3:00 pm	Warner	W 83–50	5–4	FAU Arena (1,109); Boca Raton, Florida
12/15/2012*; 7:00 pm, WHIO	at Dayton	L 56–81	5–5	UD Arena (11,553); Dayton, OH
12/18/2012*; 7:00 pm	Stetson	L 68–69	5–6	FAU Arena (1,027); Boca Raton, Florida
12/21/2012*; 7:00 pm, ESPN2	at No. 6 Indiana	L 52–88	5–7	Assembly Hall (17,472); Bloomington, IN
12/27/2012; 8:00 pm	at Troy	W 61–54	6–7 (2–1)	Trojan Arena (1,139); Troy, AL
12/29/2012; 5:35 pm	at Louisiana–Monroe	L 64–65	6–8 (2–2)	Fant–Ewing Coliseum (923); Monroe, LA
01/01/2013*; 2:00 pm	Hofstra	W 61–57	7–8	FAU Arena (1,349); Boca Raton, Florida
01/03/2013; 7:00 pm	Louisiana–Lafayette	W 75–70	8–8 (3–2)	FAU Arena (1,063); Boca Raton, Florida
01/10/2013; 8:00 pm	at Middle Tennessee	L 52–62	8–9 (3–3)	Murphy Center (3,806); Murfreesboro, TN
01/12/2013; 8:00 pm, ESPN3	at WKU	W 65–62	9–9 (4–3)	E. A. Diddle Arena (4,823); Bowling Green, KY
01/17/2013; 7:00 pm	Troy	W 80–59	10–9 (5–3)	FAU Arena (1,543); Boca Raton, Florida
01/19/2013; 7:00 pm	North Texas	L 59–61 ^{OT}	10–10 (5–4)	FAU Arena (1,797); Boca Raton, Florida
01/24/2013; 8:00 pm	at Arkansas–Little Rock	L 62–65	10–11 (5–5)	Jack Stephens Center (3,347); Little Rock, AR
01/26/2013; 8:30 pm, CSS/ESPN3	at Arkansas State	L 38–63	10–12 (5–6)	Convocation Center (5,631); Jonesboro, AR
01/31/2013; 7:00 pm	Louisiana–Monroe	W 76–71	11–12 (6–6)	FAU Arena (1,376); Boca Raton, Florida
02/02/2013; 7:00 pm	Middle Tennessee	L 56–73	11–13 (6–7)	FAU Arena (2,786); Boca Raton, Florida
02/07/2013; 7:00 pm	at FIU	L 65–84	11–14 (6–8)	U.S. Century Bank Arena (1,532); Miami, Florida
02/09/2013; 8:30 pm, CSS/ESPN3	at South Alabama	L 71–72	11–15 (6–9)	Mitchell Center (4,271); Mobile, AL
02/14/2013; 7:00 pm, ESPN3	WKU	W 84–78	12–15 (7–9)	FAU Arena (1,331); Boca Raton, Florida
02/16/2013; 8:15 pm	at Louisiana–Lafayette	L 57–58	12–16 (7–10)	Cajundome (2,370); Lafayette, LA
02/21/2013; 8:00 pm	at North Texas	L 57–66 ^{OT}	12–17 (7–11)	The Super Pit (2,532); Denton, TX
02/23/2013; 7:00 pm	Arkansas–Little Rock	W 73–59	13–17 (8–11)	FAU Arena (1,248); Boca Raton, Florida
03/02/2013; 7:00 pm	FIU	W 77–60	14–17 (9–11)	FAU Arena (2,118); Boca Raton, Florida
2013 Sun Belt tournament
03/08/2013; 9:30 pm	vs. Troy; First Round	L 79–81 ^{OT}	14–18	Summit Arena (N/A); Hot Springs, AR
*Non-conference game. ^{#}Rankings from AP Poll. (#) Tournament seedings in parentheses. All times are in Eastern Time.
