= 2012–13 Louisiana–Monroe Warhawks men's basketball team =

American college basketball season

2012–13 Louisiana–Monroe Warhawks men's basketball
- Conference: Sun Belt Conference
- West Division
- Record: 4–23 (3–17 Sun Belt)
- Head coach: Keith Richard (3rd season)
- Assistant coaches: Lonnie Cooper; Ryan Cross; Cord Wright
- Home arena: Fant–Ewing Coliseum

2012–13 Sun Belt Conference men's basketball standings
	Conf.				Overall
Team	W		L	PCT	W		L	PCT
East
Middle Tennessee	19	–	1	.950	28	–	6	.824
South Alabama	14	–	6	.700	17	–	13	.567
FIU	11	–	9	.550	18	–	14	.563
WKU †	10	–	10	.500	20	–	16	.556
Florida Atlantic	9	–	11	.450	14	–	18	.438
Troy	6	–	14	.300	12	–	21	.364
West
Arkansas State	12	–	8	.600	19	–	12	.613
Arkansas–Little Rock	11	–	9	.550	17	–	15	.531
Louisiana–Lafayette	8	–	12	.400	13	–	20	.394
North Texas	7	–	13	.350	12	–	20	.375
Louisiana–Monroe	3	–	17	.150	4	–	23	.148
† 2013 Sun Belt Tournament winner As of March 22, 2013; Rankings from AP Poll

The 2012–13 Louisiana–Monroe Warhawks men's basketball team represented the University of Louisiana at Monroe during the 2012–13 NCAA Division I men's basketball season. The Warhawks, led by third year head coach Keith Richard, played their home games at Fant–Ewing Coliseum and were members of the West Division of the Sun Belt Conference. They finished the season 4–23, 3–17 in Sun Belt play to finish in last place in the West Division. The lost in the first round of the Sun Belt tournament to WKU.

== Roster ==
Number	Name	Position	Height	Weight	Year	Hometown
1	Jayon James	Forward	6–6	240	Junior	Paterson, New Jersey
3	Marcelis Hansberry	Guard	6–0	185	Junior	Jackson, Mississippi
4	R.J. McCray	Guard	6–2	190	Junior	Arlington, Texas
5	Trent Mackey	Guard	6–4	180	Sophomore	Tampa, Florida
10	Amos Olatayo	Guard	6–4	190	Junior	Alief, Texas
11	Charles Winborne	Guard	6–1	195	Junior	Shreveport, Louisiana
14	Ife Eke	Forward	6–7	215	Sophomore	Lagos, Nigeria
15	Kyle Koszuta	Guard	6–2	180	Freshville	Niceville, Florida
23	Millaun Brown	Forward	6–7	220	Junior	Gunnison, Mississippi
24	Taylor Birchett	Guard	6–4	185	Freshman	Roswell, Georgia
33	Colton Ponder	Forward	6–5	215	Freshman	Shreveport, Louisiana
35	Trey Lindsey	Forward	6–7	210	Sophomore	Austin, Texas

== Schedule ==
Date time, TV	Opponent	Result	Record	Site (attendance) city, state
Regular season
11/11/2012*; 2:00 pm	at Oklahoma	L 51–85	0–1	Lloyd Noble Center (8,734); Norman, Oklahoma
11/24/2012*; 7:00 pm	at Louisiana Tech	L 52–68	0–2	Thomas Assembly Center (2,308); Ruston, Louisiana
11/29/2012; 7:30 pm, ESPN3	WKU	L 54–65	0–3 (0–1)	Fant–Ewing Coliseum (1,517); Monroe, Louisiana
12/01/2012; 7:00 pm	at Arkansas–Little Rock	L 58–83	0–4 (0–2)	Jack Stephens Center (3,982); Little Rock, Arkansas
12/10/2012*; 7:00 pm	Southeastern Louisiana	W 68–61 ^{OT}	1–4	Fant–Ewing Coliseum (956); Monroe, Louisiana
12/13/2012*; 7:00 pm	Southern	L 39–68	1–5	Fant–Ewing Coliseum (1,082); Monroe, Louisiana
12/17/2012*; 6:00 pm, ESPN3	at Florida State	L 48–63	1–6	Donald L. Tucker Center (5,484); Tallahassee, Florida
12/20/2012*; 7:00 pm	at UAB	L 69–76	1–7	Bartow Arena (3,248); Birmingham, Alabama
12/29/2012; 4:35 pm	Florida Atlantic	W 65–64	2–7 (1–2)	Fant–Ewing Coliseum (923); Monroe, Louisiana
01/03/2013; 7:30 pm	South Alabama	L 72–77	2–8 (1–3)	Fant–Ewing Coliseum (988); Monroe, Louisiana
01/05/2013; 7:30 pm	at North Texas	W 81–68	3–8 (2–3)	The Super Pit (3,361); Denton, Texas
01/10/2013; 6:00 pm, SBN/ESPN3	at Troy	L 55–64	3–9 (2–4)	Trojan Arena (1,416); Troy, Alabama
01/12/2013; 4:30 pm	Middle Tennessee	L 57–66	3–10 (2–5)	Fant–Ewing Coliseum (1,185); Monroe, Louisiana
01/17/2013; 7:05 pm	at South Alabama	L 56–71	3–11 (2–6)	Mitchell Center (2,045); Mobile, Alabama
01/19/2013; 7:05 pm	at Arkansas State	L 39–63	3–12 (2–7)	Convocation Center (4,783); Jonesboro, Arkansas
01/26/2013; 4:15 pm	Troy	L 64–71 ^{OT}	3–13 (2–8)	Fant–Ewing Coliseum (2,471); Monroe, Louisiana
01/31/2013; 6:00 pm	at Florida Atlantic	L 71–76	3–14 (2–9)	FAU Arena (1,376); Boca Raton, Florida
02/02/2013; 6:50 pm	at FIU	L 73–76	3–15 (2–10)	U.S. Century Bank Arena (1,121); Miami, Florida
02/07/2013; 7:30 pm	Arkansas–Little Rock	L 60–70	3–16 (2–11)	Fant–Ewing Coliseum (1,114); Monroe, Louisiana
02/10/2013; 7:45 pm	at Louisiana–Lafayette	L 66–90	3–17 (2–12)	Cajundome (2,131); Lafayette, Louisiana
02/14/2013; 7:30 pm	North Texas	W 85–73	4–17 (3–12)	Fant–Ewing Coliseum (904); Monroe, Louisiana
02/16/2013; 4:20 pm	Arkansas State	L 54–87	4–18 (3–13)	Fant–Ewing Coliseum (1,421); Monroe, Louisiana
02/21/2013; 7:00 pm, ESPN3	at WKU	L 57–75	4–19 (3–14)	E. A. Diddle Arena (3,623); Bowling Green, Kentucky
02/23/2013; 5:40 pm	at Middle Tennessee	L 46–87	4–20 (3–15)	Murphy Center (7,026); Murfreesboro, Tennessee
02/28/2013; 7:30 pm	FIU	L 58–67	4–21 (3–16)	Fant–Ewing Coliseum (1,221); Monroe, Louisiana
03/02/2013; 4:20 pm	Louisiana–Lafayette	L 63–71	4–22 (3–17)	Fant–Ewing Coliseum (1,281); Monroe, Louisiana
2013 Sun Belt tournament
03/08/2013; 6:00 pm	vs. WKU; First Round	L 60–74	4–23	Summit Arena (N/A); Hot Springs, Arkansas
*Non-conference game. ^{#}Rankings from AP Poll. (#) Tournament seedings in parentheses. All times are in Central Time.
