= 2012–13 Middle Tennessee Blue Raiders men's basketball team =

American college basketball season

2012–13 Middle Tennessee Blue Raiders men's basketball

Sun Belt East Division and overall regular season Champions

NCAA tournament Midwest Region 11 Seed, First Four
- Conference: Sun Belt Conference
- East Division
- Record: 28–6 (19–1 Sun Belt)
- Head coach: Kermit Davis (11th season)
- Assistant coaches: Win Case; Greg Grensing; Monte Towe
- Home arena: Murphy Center

2012–13 Sun Belt Conference men's basketball standings
	Conf.				Overall
Team	W		L	PCT	W		L	PCT
East
Middle Tennessee	19	–	1	.950	28	–	6	.824
South Alabama	14	–	6	.700	17	–	13	.567
FIU	11	–	9	.550	18	–	14	.563
WKU †	10	–	10	.500	20	–	16	.556
Florida Atlantic	9	–	11	.450	14	–	18	.438
Troy	6	–	14	.300	12	–	21	.364
West
Arkansas State	12	–	8	.600	19	–	12	.613
Arkansas–Little Rock	11	–	9	.550	17	–	15	.531
Louisiana–Lafayette	8	–	12	.400	13	–	20	.394
North Texas	7	–	13	.350	12	–	20	.375
Louisiana–Monroe	3	–	17	.150	4	–	23	.148
† 2013 Sun Belt Tournament winner As of March 22, 2013; Rankings from AP Poll

The 2012–13 Middle Tennessee Blue Raiders men's basketball team represented Middle Tennessee State University during the 2012–13 NCAA Division I men's basketball season. The Blue Raiders, led by 11th year head coach Kermit Davis, played their home games at the Murphy Center and were members of the East Division of the Sun Belt Conference. They finished the season 28–6, 19–1 in Sun Belt play to become Sun Belt regular season champions. They advanced to the semifinals of the Sun Belt tournament where they lost to FIU. They received an at-large bid to the 2013 NCAA tournament, their first tournament bid since 1989, where they lost in the First Four round to Saint Mary's.

This was the Blue Raiders last season as a member of the Sun Belt. In July, 2013, they will become a member of Conference USA.

== Roster ==
Number	Name	Position	Height	Weight	Year	Hometown
0	Zane Gibson	Guard	6–2	180	Junior	Chattanooga, Tennessee
1	Neiko Hunter	Forward	6–7	215	Junior	Eutaw, Alabama
3	James Gallman	Guard	5–11	180	Senior	Knoxville, Tennessee
4	Finoy Perkins	Forward	6-4	200	Junior	Memphis, Tennessee
5	Trantell Knight	Guard	6–1	195	Junior	Rentz, Georgia
10	Jaqawn Raymond	Guard	6–4	200	Sophomore	Statesboro, Georgia
11	Blake Johnson	Guard	5-10	160	Freshman	Memphis, Tennessee
12	Shawn Jones	Forward	6–8	227	Junior	Hialeah, Florida
13	Bruce Massey	Guard	6–3	195	Senior	Germantown, Maryland
14	Marcos Knight	Guard	6–2	210	Senior	Rentz, Georgia
15	Raymond Cintron	Guard	6–0	195	Senior	San Juan, Puerto Rico
21	Torin Walker	Center	6–11	248	Junior	Columbus, Georgia
22	Jason Jones	Guard/Forward	6–6	195	Senior	Memphis, Tennessee
24	Kerry Hammonds	Guard/Forward	6–5	200	Junior	Murfreesboro, Tennessee
30	JT Sulton	Forward	6–8	230	Senior	Yazoo City, Mississippi
32	Gavin Gibson	Guard	6–4	205	Sophomore	Chattanooga, Tennessee
42	Jacquez Rozier	Forward	6–7	210	Sophomore	Waynesboro, Georgia

== Schedule ==
Date time, TV	Rank^{#}	Opponent^{#}	Result	Record	Site (attendance) city, state
Exhibition
11/05/2012*; 7:00 pm		Auburn–Montgomery	W 107–65		Murphy Center (2,912); Murfreesboro, TN
Regular season
11/09/2012*; 7:45 pm		Alabama State; Global Sports Main Event	W 97–53	1–0	Murphy Center (5,806); Murfreesboro, TN
11/13/2012*; 7:00 pm		at Savannah State; Global Sports Main Event	W 58–55	2–0	Tiger Arena (890); Savannah, GA
11/18/2012*; 3:00 p.m., Sun/FS South		vs. No. 10 Florida; Global Sports Main Event	L 45–66	2–1	Tampa Bay Times Forum (7,161); Tampa, FL
11/20/2012*; 6:00 pm		at UCF; Global Sports Main Event	W 75–61	3–1	UCF Arena (4,118); Orlando, FL
11/24/2012*; 6:00 pm		Texas Southern	W 79–52	4–1	Murphy Center (5,411); Murfreesboro, TN
11/29/2012; 7:00 pm		at Louisiana–Lafayette	W 72–58	5–1 (1–0)	Cajundome (1,881); Lafayette, LA
12/02/2012*; 1:00 pm		at Akron	L 77–82 ^{OT}	5–2	James A. Rhodes Arena (2,711); Akron, OH
12/05/2012*; 7:00 pm, ESPN3		UAB	W 84–64	6–2	Murphy Center (4,587); Murfreesboro, TN
12/08/2012*; 4:00 pm, ESPN3		Ole Miss	W 65–62	7–2	Murphy Center (6,107); Murfreesboro, TN
12/13/2012*; 6:00 pm, ESPN3		at Belmont	L 49–64	7–3	Curb Event Center (2,562); Nashville, TN
12/18/2012*; 7:00 pm		Tennessee State	W 77–48	8–3	Murphy Center (3,717); Murfreesboro, TN
12/21/2012*; 8:00 pm, ESPNU		vs. Vanderbilt	W 56–52	9–3	Bridgestone Arena (8,307); Nashville, TN
12/29/2012; 5:00 pm		FIU	W 69–52	10–3 (2–0)	Murphy Center (3,422); Murfreesboro, TN
12/31/2012; 7:00 pm, ESPNU		North Texas	W 75–57	11–3 (3–0)	Murphy Center (3,872); Murfreesboro, TN
01/03/2013; 7:05 pm		at Arkansas State	L 60–66 ^{OT}	11–4 (3–1)	Convocation Center (2,937); Jonesboro, AR
01/05/2013; 7:20 pm		at South Alabama	W 60–56	12–4 (4–1)	Mitchell Center (2,602); Mobile, AL
01/10/2013; 7:00 pm		Florida Atlantic	W 62–52	13–4 (5–1)	Murphy Center (3,806); Murfreesboro, TN
01/12/2013; 4:30 pm		at Louisiana–Monroe	W 66–57	14–4 (6–1)	Fant–Ewing Coliseum (1,185); Monroe, LA
01/17/2013; 7:00 pm, ESPN3		Arkansas–Little Rock	W 82–50	15–4 (7–1)	Murphy Center (5,215); Murfreesboro, TN
01/19/2013; 5:30 pm		Louisiana–Lafayette	W 82–60	16–4 (8–1)	Murphy Center (5,220); Murfreesboro, TN
01/24/2013; 7:00 pm		at North Texas	W 72–64	17–4 (9–1)	The Super Pit (3,423); Denton, TX
01/26/2013; 3:00 pm, ESPN2		WKU	W 72–53	18–4 (10–1)	Murphy Center (10,105); Murfreesboro, TN
01/31/2013; 6:40 pm		at FIU	W 66–64	19–4 (11–1)	U.S. Century Bank Arena (1,143); Miami, FL
02/02/2013; 6:00 pm		at Florida Atlantic	W 73–56	20–4 (12–1)	FAU Arena (2,786); Boca Raton, FL
02/07/2013; 7:00 pm, ESPN3		Arkansas State	W 73–60	21–4 (13–1)	Murphy Center (4,307); Murfreesboro, TN
02/09/2013; 5:00 pm		Troy	W 93–41	22–4 (14–1)	Murphy Center (3,942); Murfreesboro, TN
02/16/2013; 7:00 pm		at Arkansas–Little Rock	W 66–61	23–4 (15–1)	Jack Stephens Center (3,985); Little Rock, AR
02/21/2013; 7:00 pm, ESPN3		South Alabama	W 85–50	24–4 (16–1)	Murphy Center (5,712); Murfreesboro, TN
02/23/2013; 5:40 pm		Louisiana–Monroe	W 87–46	25–4 (17–1)	Murphy Center (7,026); Murfreesboro, TN
02/28/2013; 7:30 pm		at Troy	W 66–56	26–4 (18–1)	Trojan Arena (1,674); Troy, AL
03/02/2013; 5:30 pm, ESPN3		at WKU	W 70–62	27–4 (19–1)	E. A. Diddle Arena (7,326); Bowling Green, KY
2013 Sun Belt tournament
03/09/2013; 6:30 pm, ESPN3		vs. Louisiana–Lafayette; Quarterfinals	W 81–66	28–4	Summit Arena (N/A); Hot Springs, AR
03/10/2013; 6:30 pm		vs. FIU; Semifinals	L 57–61	28–5	Summit Arena (N/A); Hot Springs, AR
2013 NCAA tournament
03/19/2013*; 8:22 pm, truTV	No. (11 MW)	vs. (11 MW) Saint Mary's; First Four	L 54–67	28–6	UD Arena (12,027); Dayton, OH
*Non-conference game. ^{#}Rankings from AP Poll. (#) Tournament seedings in parentheses. All times are in Central Time. (#) during NCAA Tournament is seed with Region MW=Midwest.
