= 2012–13 Arkansas State Red Wolves men's basketball team =

American college basketball season

2012–13 Arkansas State Red Wolves men's basketball

Sun Belt West Division Champions
- Conference: Sun Belt Conference
- West Division
- Record: 19–12 (12–8 Sun Belt)
- Head coach: John Brady (5th season)
- Assistant coaches: Melvin Haralson; Corey Barker; Jeff Clapacs
- Home arena: Convocation Center

2012–13 Sun Belt Conference men's basketball standings
	Conf.				Overall
Team	W		L	PCT	W		L	PCT
East
Middle Tennessee	19	–	1	.950	28	–	6	.824
South Alabama	14	–	6	.700	17	–	13	.567
FIU	11	–	9	.550	18	–	14	.563
WKU †	10	–	10	.500	20	–	16	.556
Florida Atlantic	9	–	11	.450	14	–	18	.438
Troy	6	–	14	.300	12	–	21	.364
West
Arkansas State	12	–	8	.600	19	–	12	.613
Arkansas–Little Rock	11	–	9	.550	17	–	15	.531
Louisiana–Lafayette	8	–	12	.400	13	–	20	.394
North Texas	7	–	13	.350	12	–	20	.375
Louisiana–Monroe	3	–	17	.150	4	–	23	.148
† 2013 Sun Belt Tournament winner As of March 22, 2013; Rankings from AP Poll

The 2012–13 Arkansas State Red Wolves men's basketball team represented Arkansas State University during the 2012–13 NCAA Division I men's basketball season. The Red Wolves, led by fifth year head coach John Brady, played their home games at the Convocation Center, and were members of the West Division of the Sun Belt Conference. They finished the season 19–12, 12–8 in Sun Belt play to be West Division champions. They advanced to the semifinals of the Sun Belt tournament where they lost to WKU. Despite the 19 wins, they did not participate in a postseason tournament.

== Roster ==
Number	Name	Position	Height	Weight	Year	Hometown
0	Cameron Golden	Guard	6–0	154	Freshman	Memphis, Tennessee
1	Rakeem Dickerson	Guard	6–0	177	Sophomore	Little Rock, Arkansas
2	Trey Finn	Guard	6–2	213	Senior	Little Rock, Arkansas
3	Darion Griswold	Forward	6–5	240	Sophomore	Dumas, Arkansas
4	Josh Pierre	Guard	6–0	181	Freshman	Baton Rouge, Louisiana
5	Marcus Hooten	Guard	6–3	208	Senior	Jackson, Mississippi
14	Kelvin Downs	Forward	6–9	232	Freshman	Arlington, Texas
15	Brandon Pterson	Guard/Forward	6–8	217	Senior	Birmingham, Alabama
20	Kirk Van Slyke	Forward	6–10	235	Senior	The Woodlands, Texas
23	Jordan Weaver	Guard	6–3	204	Sophomore	Parkin, Arkansas
24	Ed Townsel	Guard	6–0	166	Junior	Starkville, Mississippi
31	Melvin Johnson III	Guard	6–6	167	Senior	Dallas, Texas
34	Seth Kisler	Forward	6–8	198	Junior	Fort Wayne, Indiana
35	Reaford Worsham	Guard	6–5	190	Freshman	Waynesboro, Mississippi
40	Kendrick Washington	Forward	6–7	274	Junior	Shreveport, Louisiana
42	Kristopher Brown	Forward	6–7	247	Freshman	Fort Worth, Texas

== Schedule ==
Date time, TV	Opponent	Result	Record	Site (attendance) city, state
Exhibition
11/01/2012*; 7:00 pm	Southern Arkansas	W 83–67		Convocation Center (2,596); Jonesboro, AR
11/06/2012*; 7:00 pm	Henderson State	W 95–65		Convocation Center (2,579); Jonesboro, AR
Regular season
11/10/2012*; 1:00 pm	at Dayton	L 61–74	0–1	UD Arena (12,265); Dayton, OH
11/13/2012*; 7:00 pm	Arkansas–Monticello	W 76–47	1–1	Convocation Center (2,745); Jonesboro, AR
11/16/2012*; 7:00 pm	at Tennessee–Martin	W 77–73 ^{3OT}	2–1	Skyhawk Arena (2,011); Martin, TN
11/21/2012*; 7:00 pm	at Central Arksnsas	W 73–72	3–1	Farris Center (4,127); Conway, AR
11/25/2012*; 2:00 pm	Lamar	W 93–53	4–1	Convocation Center (1,927); Jonesboro, AR
11/29/2012; 6:00 pm	at FIU	L 61–80	4–2 (0–1)	U.S. Century Bank Arena (774); Miami, FL
12/01/2012; 6:00 pm	at Florida Atlantic	L 65–72	4–3 (0–2)	FAU Arena (1,321); Boca Raton, FL
12/08/2012*; 2:00 pm	St. Bonaventure	W 73–70	5–3	Convocation Center (2,378); Jonesboro, AR
12/16/2012*; 2:05 pm	Austin Peay	W 69–57	6–3	Convocation Center (2,652); Jonesboro, AR
12/19/2012*; 7:35 pm, ESPN3	Murray State	L 54–61	6–4	Convocation Center (2,834); Jonesboro, AR
12/22/2012*; 6:00 pm	at Kent State	L 69–73	6–5	M.A.C. Center (2,325); Kent, OH
12/27/2012; 7:05 pm	Louisiana–Lafayette	W 87–70	7–5 (1–2)	Convocation Center (2,734); Jonesboro, AR
12/29/2012; 7:20 pm	at South Alabama	W 63–54	8–5 (2–2)	Mitchell Center (2,545); Mobile, AL
01/03/2013; 7:05 pm	Middle Tennessee	W 66–60 ^{OT}	9–5 (3–2)	Convocation Center (2,937); Jonesboro, AR
01/05/2013; 7:05 pm, ESPN3	WKU	W 75–61	10–5 (4–2)	Convocation Center (2,922); Jonesboro, AR
01/10/2013; 7:05 pm	FIU	L 64–66	10–6 (4–3)	Convocation Center (2,870); Jonesboro, AR
01/12/2013; 7:15 pm	at Louisiana–Lafayette	L 56–61	10–7 (4–4)	Cajundome (3,040); Lafayette, LA
01/19/2013; 7:05 pm	Louisiana–Monroe	W 63–39	11–7 (5–4)	Convocation Center (4,783); Jonesboro, AR
01/24/2013; 7:30 pm	at Troy	L 67–74 ^{OT}	11–8 (5–5)	Trojan Arena (1,743); Troy, AL
01/26/2013; 7:30 pm, ESPN3	Florida Atlantic	W 63–38	12–8 (6–5)	Convocation Center (5,631); Jonesboro, AR
01/31/2013; 7:05 pm	South Alabama	W 74–62	13–8 (7–5)	Convocation Center (2,862); Jonesboro, AR
02/02/2013; 7:05 pm	North Texas	W 75–66 ^{OT}	14–8 (8–5)	Convocation Center (3,786); Jonesboro, AR
02/07/2013; 7:00 pm, ESPN3	at Middle Tennessee	L 60–73	14–9 (8–6)	Murphy Center (4,307); Murfreesboro, TN
02/09/2013; 7:00 pm, ESPN3	at WKU	W 67–49	15–9 (9–6)	E. A. Diddle Arena (5,862); Bowling Green, KY
02/14/2013; 7:05 pm	Arkansas–Little Rock	W 86–62	16–9 (10–6)	Convocation Center (4,625); Jonesboro, AR
02/16/2013; 4:20 pm	at Louisiana–Monroe	W 87–54	17–9 (11–6)	Fant–Ewing Coliseum (1,421); Monroe, LA
02/23/2013; 7:05 pm	Troy	W 58–50	18–9 (12–6)	Convocation Center (5,268); Jonesboro, AR
02/28/2013; 7:00 pm	at North Texas	L 50–74	18–10 (12–7)	The Super Pit (2,851); Denton, TX
03/02/2013; 7:00 pm	at Arkansas–Little Rock	L 71–78	18–11 (12–8)	Jack Stephens Center (5,337); Little Rock, AR
2013 Sun Belt tournament
03/09/2013; 9:30 pm, ESPN3	vs. Troy; Quarterfinals	W 68–63 ^{OT}	19–11	Summit Arena (N/A); Hot Springs, AR
03/10/2013; 9:18 pm, ESPN3	vs. WKU; Semifinals	L 56–58	19–12	Summit Arena (N/A); Hot Springs, AR
*Non-conference game. ^{#}Rankings from AP Poll. (#) Tournament seedings in parentheses. All times are in Central Time.
