= 2012–13 North Texas Mean Green men's basketball team =

American college basketball season

2012–13 North Texas Mean Green men's basketball
- Conference: Sun Belt Conference
- West Division
- Record: 12–20 (7–13 Sun Belt)
- Head coach: Tony Benford (1st season)
- Assistant coaches: Rob Evans; David Anwar; Bart Lundy
- Home arena: UNT Coliseum

2012–13 Sun Belt Conference men's basketball standings
	Conf.				Overall
Team	W		L	PCT	W		L	PCT
East
Middle Tennessee	19	–	1	.950	28	–	6	.824
South Alabama	14	–	6	.700	17	–	13	.567
FIU	11	–	9	.550	18	–	14	.563
WKU †	10	–	10	.500	20	–	16	.556
Florida Atlantic	9	–	11	.450	14	–	18	.438
Troy	6	–	14	.300	12	–	21	.364
West
Arkansas State	12	–	8	.600	19	–	12	.613
Arkansas–Little Rock	11	–	9	.550	17	–	15	.531
Louisiana–Lafayette	8	–	12	.400	13	–	20	.394
North Texas	7	–	13	.350	12	–	20	.375
Louisiana–Monroe	3	–	17	.150	4	–	23	.148
† 2013 Sun Belt Tournament winner As of March 22, 2013; Rankings from AP Poll

The 2012–13 North Texas Mean Green men's basketball team represented the University of North Texas during the 2012–13 NCAA Division I men's basketball season. The Mean Green, led by first year head coach Tony Benford, played their home games at UNT Coliseum, nicknamed The Super Pit, and were members of the West Division of the Sun Belt Conference. They finished the season 12–20, 7–13 in Sun Belt play to finish in fourth place in the West Division. They lost in the first round of the Sun Belt tournament to Louisiana–Lafayette.

This was the Mean Green's final season as a member of the Sun Belt. In July, 2013, they will join Conference USA.

== Roster ==
Number	Name	Position	Height	Weight	Year	Hometown
1	Jacob Holmen	Forward	6–8	225	Senior	Whitehouse, Texas
2	Brandan Walton	Guard	6–2	205	Senior	Compton, California
3	Alzee Williams	Guard	6–4	180	Junior	Dallas, Texas
4	P.J. Hardwick	Guard	5–10	170	Freshman	Miami, Florida
5	Chris Jones	Guard	6–2	202	Sophomore	Garland, Texas
11	Justin Patton	Forward	6–7	200	Senior	Bossier City, Louisiana
13	Tony Mitchell	Forward	6–8	235	Sophomore	Dallas, Texas
21	T.J. Taylor	Guard	6–3	220	Sophomore	Denison, Texas
22	Clarke Overlander	Guard	6–5	210	Freshman	Argyle, Texas
23	Jordan Williams	Guard	6–6	195	Sophomore	Dallas, Texas
25	Niko Stojiljkovic	Forward	6–9	215	Senior	Paris, France
32	Roger Franklin	Guard	6–5	220	Senior	Duncanville, Texas
44	Keith Coleman	Forward	6–10	245	Sophomore	Philadelphia, Pennsylvania

== Schedule ==
Date time, TV	Opponent	Result	Record	Site (attendance) city, state
Exhibition
11/01/2012*; 7:00 pm	East Central	W 90–49		The Super Pit; Denton, TX
Regular season
11/09/2012*; 7:00 pm	at No. 16 Creighton	L 51–71	0–1	CenturyLink Center Omaha (17,139); Omaha, NE
11/12/2012*; 9:30 pm	vs. Alabama–Huntsville; NIT Season Tip-Off	L 75–78	0–2	Bramlage Coliseum (12,068); Manhattan, KS
11/13/2012*; 7:00 pm	vs. Lamar; NIT Season Tip-Off	W 74–59	1–2	Bramlage Coliseum (12,006); Manhattan, KS
11/16/2012*; 7:00 pm	Cameron	W 78–49	2–2	The Super Pit (2,673); Denton, TX
11/19/2012*; 3:30 pm	vs. IUPUI; NIT Season Tip-Off	W 80–66	3–2	John Paul Jones Arena (1,444); Charlottesville, VA
11/20/2012*; 6:00 pm	at Virginia; NIT Season Tip-Off	L 64–80	3–3	John Paul Jones Arena (1,745); Charlottesville, VA
11/28/2012*; 7:00 pm, TXA 21	Texas–Arlington	L 59–72	3–4	The Super Pit (4,832); Denton, TX
12/01/2012; 7:00 pm	Louisiana–Lafayette	L 76–80	3–5 (0–1)	The Super Pit (3,631); Denton, TX
12/05/2012*; 7:00 pm, FSMW	at Saint Louis	L 63–67	3–6	Chaifetz Arena (4,817); St. Louis, MO
12/08/2012*; 7:00 pm	Jackson State	W 83–65	4–6	The Super Pit (2,872); Denton, TX
12/16/2012*; 1:00 pm	Southeastern Louisiana	W 45–40	5–6	The Super Pit (2,645); Denton, TX
12/20/2012*; 7:00 pm	Lehigh	L 75–90	5–7	The Super Pit (4,955); Denton, TX
12/29/2012; 7:00 pm, ESPN3	at WKU	L 64–70	5–8 (0–2)	E. A. Diddle Arena (4,776); Bowling Green, KY
12/31/2012; 7:00 pm, ESPNU	at Middle Tennessee	L 57–75	5–9 (0–3)	Murphy Center (3,872); Murfreesboro, TN
01/03/2013; 7:00 pm	Troy	W 76–59	6–9 (1–3)	The Super Pit (2,338); Denton, TX
01/05/2013; 7:30 pm	Louisiana–Monroe	L 68–81	6–10 (1–4)	The Super Pit (3,361); Denton, TX
01/10/2013; 7:00 pm	at Arkansas–Little Rock	L 53–67	6–11 (1–5)	Jack Stephens Center (3,288); Little Rock, AR
01/12/2013; 7:15 pm	South Alabama	W 66–56	7–11 (2–5)	The Super Pit (3,642); Denton, TX
01/17/2013; 6:50 pm	at FIU	L 64–70	7–12 (2–6)	U.S. Century Bank Arena (1,109); Miami, FL
01/19/2013; 6:00 pm	at Florida Atlantic	W 61–59 ^{OT}	8–12 (3–6)	FAU Arena (1,797); Boca Raton, FL
01/24/2013; 7:00 pm	Middle Tennessee	L 64–72	8–13 (3–7)	The Super Pit (3,423); Denton, TX
01/26/2013; 7:00 pm	Arkansas–Little Rock	L 57–62	8–14 (3–8)	The Super Pit (3,997); Denton, TX
01/31/2013; 7:00 pm	at Louisiana–Lafayette	L 74–105	8–15 (3–9)	Cajundome (2,294); Lafayette, LA
02/02/2013; 7:05 pm	at Arkansas State	L 66–75 ^{OT}	8–16 (3–10)	Convocation Center (3,786); Jonesboro, AR
02/07/2013; 7:00 pm, TXA 21	WKU	L 59–70	8–17 (3–11)	The Super Pit (3,528); Denton, TX
02/09/2013; 7:00 pm	FIU	W 77–67	9–17 (4–11)	The Super Pit (5,497); Denton, TX
02/14/2013; 7:30 pm	at Louisiana–Monroe	L 73–85	9–18 (4–12)	Fant–Ewing Coliseum (904); Monroe, LA
02/16/2013; 7:30 pm, Sun Belt Network/ESPN3	at Troy	W 63–61	10–18 (5–12)	Sartain Hall (1,954); Troy, AL
02/21/2013; 7:00 pm	Florida Atlantic	W 66–57 ^{OT}	11–18 (6–12)	The Super Pit (2,532); Denton, TX
02/23/2013; 7:00 pm	at South Alabama	L 57–69	11–19 (6–13)	Mitchell Center (4,001); Mobile, AL
02/28/2013; 7:00 pm	Arkansas State	W 74–50	12–19 (7–13)	The Super Pit (2,851); Denton, TX
2013 Sun Belt tournament
03/08/2013; 6:30 pm	vs. Louisiana–Lafayette; First Round	L 55–74	12–20	Convention Center Court (N/A); Hot Springs, AR
*Non-conference game. ^{#}Rankings from AP Poll. (#) Tournament seedings in parentheses. All times are in Central Time.
