= 2012–13 Arkansas–Little Rock Trojans men's basketball team =

American college basketball season

2012–13 Arkansas–Little Rock Trojans men's basketball
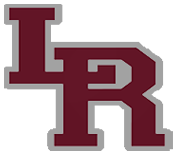
- Conference: Sun Belt Conference
- West Division
- Record: 17–15 (11–9 Sun Belt)
- Head coach: Steve Shields (10th season)
- Assistant coaches: Joe Kleine; Charles Cunningham; Robert Lee
- Home arena: Jack Stephens Center

2012–13 Sun Belt Conference men's basketball standings
	Conf.				Overall
Team	W		L	PCT	W		L	PCT
East
Middle Tennessee	19	–	1	.950	28	–	6	.824
South Alabama	14	–	6	.700	17	–	13	.567
FIU	11	–	9	.550	18	–	14	.563
WKU †	10	–	10	.500	20	–	16	.556
Florida Atlantic	9	–	11	.450	14	–	18	.438
Troy	6	–	14	.300	12	–	21	.364
West
Arkansas State	12	–	8	.600	19	–	12	.613
Arkansas–Little Rock	11	–	9	.550	17	–	15	.531
Louisiana–Lafayette	8	–	12	.400	13	–	20	.394
North Texas	7	–	13	.350	12	–	20	.375
Louisiana–Monroe	3	–	17	.150	4	–	23	.148
† 2013 Sun Belt Tournament winner As of March 22, 2013; Rankings from AP Poll

The 2012–13 Arkansas–Little Rock Trojans men's basketball team represented the University of Arkansas at Little Rock during the 2012–13 NCAA Division I men's basketball season. The Trojans, led by tenth year head coach Steve Shields, played their home games at the Jack Stephens Center, and were members of the West Division of the Sun Belt Conference. They finished the season 17–15, 11–9 in Sun Belt play to finish in second place in the West Division. They lost in the quarterfinals of the Sun Belt tournament to FIU. Despite the 17 wins and winning record, they did not participate in a post season tournament.

== Roster ==
Number	Name	Position	Height	Weight	Year	Hometown
1	Casey Wilmath	Guard	6–2	176	Freshman	Searcy, Arkansas
2	John Gillon	Guard	6–0	166	Freshman	Houston, Texas
3	Josh Hagins	Guard	6–1	168	Freshman	Bossier City, Louisiana
5	Kemy Osse	Guard	6–1	190	Freshman	Montreal, Quebec
11	Ted Crass	Guard	5–10	166	Senior	Little Rock, Arkansas
12	Legroy Isler	Guard/Forward	6–5	196	Junior	Brooklyn, New York
15	Stetson Billings	Forward	6–5	190	Freshman	Strong, Arkansas
21	Mareik Isom	Guard/Forward	6–7	193	Freshman	Austin, Texas
23	Taggart Lockhard	Forward	6–4	220	Sophomore	Talihina, Oklahoma
24	Ben Dillard	Guard	6–2	190	Sophomore	Frisco, Texas
33	James White	Forward	6–8	215	Freshman	Jonesboro, Arkansas
35	Jalen Washington	Guard	6–5	175	Sophomore	Austin, Texas
40	Mike Evans	Forward	6–8	215	Junior	Jacksonville, Arkansas
44	Michael Javes	Forward	6–10	239	Sophomore	Cali, Colombia
50	Andrew Poulter	Center	6–11	282	Freshman	New Braunfels, Texas
53	Will Neighbour	Forward	6–10	219	Junior	Grayshott, England
55	Gus Leeper	Forward	6–10	249	Sophomore	Austin, Texas

== Schedule ==
Date time, TV	Opponent	Result	Record	Site (attendance) city, state
Regular season
11/09/2012*; 7:00 pm	Tennessee–Martin	W 84–68	1–0	Jack Stephens Center (3,812); Little Rock, AR
11/14/2012*; 7:00 pm	at Louisiana Tech	L 52–70	1–1	Thomas Assembly Center (2,465); Ruston, LA
11/16/2012*; 7:00 pm	at Ole Miss	L 52–92	1–2	Tad Smith Coliseum (3,251); Oxford, MS
11/19/2012*; 7:00 pm	Milwaukee; Hoops for Hope Classic	W 59–43	2–2	Jack Stephens Center (2,811); Little Rock, AR
11/21/2012*; 7:30 pm	Jacksonville; Hoops for Hope Classic	W 78–56	3–2	Jack Stephens Center (2,905); Little Rock, AR
11/24/2012*; 8:30 pm	vs. SMU; Hoops for Hope Classic	W 69–56	4–2	(261); Puerto Vallarta, Mexico
11/25/2012*; 8:30 pm	vs. South Carolina; Hoops for Hope Classic	L 62–74	4–3	(276); Puerto Vallarta, Mexico
11/29/2012; 7:30 pm	Troy	W 58–56	5–3 (1–0)	Jack Stephens Center (3,492); Little Rock, AR
12/01/2012; 7:00 pm	Louisiana–Monroe	W 83–58	6–3 (2–0)	Jack Stephens Center (3,982); Little Rock, AR
12/04/2012*; 5:15 pm	St. Gregory's	W 91–30	7–3	Jack Stephens Center (2,411); Little Rock, AR
12/06/2012*; 6:00 pm	at No. 11 Cincinnati	L 53–87	7–4	Fifth Third Arena (6,127); Cincinnati, OH
12/15/2012*; 2:00 pm	Tulsa	W 72–65	8–4	Jack Stephens Center (3,769); Little Rock, AR
12/17/2012*; 7:00 pm	Louisiana Tech	L 73–75	8–5	Jack Stephens Center (3,734); Little Rock, AR
12/22/2012; 2:00 pm	at South Alabama	L 62–77	8–6 (2–1)	Mitchell Center (1,875); Mobile, AL
12/29/2012; 7:45 pm	at Louisiana–Lafayette	L 70–79	8–7 (2–2)	Cajundome (2,436); Lafayette, LA
01/03/2013; 7:30 pm, ESPN3	WKU	W 75–67	9–7 (3–2)	Jack Stephens Center (3,871); Little Rock, AR
01/05/2013; 7:30 pm	at Troy	L 64–67	9–8 (3–3)	Sartain Hall (1,673); Troy, AL
01/10/2013; 7:00 pm	North Texas	W 67–53	10–8 (4–3)	Jack Stephens Center (3,288); Little Rock, AR
01/12/2013; 3:30 pm, ESPN3	FIU	W 88–76	11–8 (5–3)	Jack Stephens Center (3,318); Little Rock, AR
01/17/2013; 7:00 pm, ESPN3	at Middle Tennessee	L 50–82	11–9 (5–4)	Murphy Center (5,215); Murfreesboro, TN
01/19/2013; 5:00 pm, ESPN3	at WKU	W 59–54	12–9 (6–4)	E. A. Diddle Arena (5,221); Bowling Green, KY
01/24/2013; 7:00 pm	Florida Atlantic	W 65–62	13–9 (7–4)	Jack Stephens Center (3,347); Little Rock, AR
01/26/2013; 7:00 pm	at North Texas	W 62–57	14–9 (8–4)	The Super Pit (3,997); Denton, TX
02/02/2013; 7:00 pm	South Alabama	L 66–70	14–10 (8–5)	Jack Stephens Center (3,935); Little Rock, AR
02/07/2013; 7:30 pm	at Louisiana–Monroe	W 70–60	15–10 (9–5)	Fant–Ewing Coliseum (1,114); Monroe, LA
02/14/2013; 7:05 pm	at Arkansas State	L 62–86	15–11 (9–6)	Convocation Center (4,625); Jonesboro, AR
02/16/2013; 7:00 pm	Middle Tennessee	L 61–66	15–12 (9–7)	Jack Stephens Center (3,985); Little Rock, AR
02/21/2013; 6:45 pm	at FIU	L 52–65	15–13 (9–8)	U.S. Century Bank Arena (1,207); Miami, FL
02/23/2013; 6:00 pm	at Florida Atlantic	L 59–73	15–14 (9–9)	FAU Arena (1,248); Boca Raton, FL
02/28/2013; 7:30 pm	Louisiana–Lafayette	W 77–68	16–14 (10–9)	Jack Stephens Center (3,577); Little Rock, AR
03/02/2013; 7:00 pm	Arkansas State	W 78–71	17–14 (11–9)	Jack Stephens Center (5,337); Little Rock, AR
2013 Sun Belt tournament
03/09/2013; 6:00 pm	vs. FIU; Quarterfinals	L 54–69	17–15	Convention Center Court (N/A); Hot Springs, AR
*Non-conference game. ^{#}Rankings from AP Poll. (#) Tournament seedings in parentheses. All times are in Central Time.
