= 2012–13 Western Kentucky Hilltoppers basketball team =

American college basketball season

2012–13 Western Kentucky Hilltoppers basketball

Sun Belt Tournament champion

NCAA Tournament, round of 64
- Conference: Sun Belt Conference
- East Division
- Record: 20–16 (10–10 Sun Belt)
- Head coach: Ray Harper (1st Full season)
- Assistant coaches: Lawrence Brenneman; David Boyden; Phil Cunningham
- Home arena: E. A. Diddle Arena

2012–13 Sun Belt Conference men's basketball standings
| | Conf. | | | | Overall |
| Team | W | | L | PCT | W | | L | PCT |
|---|---|---|---|---|---|---|---|---|
East
| Middle Tennessee | 19 | – | 1 | .950 | 28 | – | 6 | .824 |
| South Alabama | 14 | – | 6 | .700 | 17 | – | 13 | .567 |
| FIU | 11 | – | 9 | .550 | 18 | – | 14 | .563 |
| WKU † | 10 | – | 10 | .500 | 20 | – | 16 | .556 |
| Florida Atlantic | 9 | – | 11 | .450 | 14 | – | 18 | .438 |
| Troy | 6 | – | 14 | .300 | 12 | – | 21 | .364 |
West
| Arkansas State | 12 | – | 8 | .600 | 19 | – | 12 | .613 |
| Arkansas–Little Rock | 11 | – | 9 | .550 | 17 | – | 15 | .531 |
| Louisiana–Lafayette | 8 | – | 12 | .400 | 13 | – | 20 | .394 |
| North Texas | 7 | – | 13 | .350 | 12 | – | 20 | .375 |
| Louisiana–Monroe | 3 | – | 17 | .150 | 4 | – | 23 | .148 |
† 2013 Sun Belt Tournament winner As of March 22, 2013; Rankings from AP Poll

The 2012–13 Western Kentucky Hilltoppers men's basketball team represented Western Kentucky University during the 2012–13 NCAA Division I men's basketball season. The Hilltoppers were led by head coach Ray Harper which was his first full year after coaching the final 19 games in 2011–12. They played their home games at E. A. Diddle Arena and were members of the East Division of the Sun Belt Conference. They finished the season 20–16, 10–10 in Sun Belt play to finish in fourth place in the East Division. They were champions of the Sun Belt tournament, winning the championship game over FIU, to earn an automatic bid to the 2013 NCAA tournament where they lost in the second round to Kansas. T. J. Price and George Fant made the All-Conference Team; Fant and Brandon Harris were selected to the SBC Tournament Team, and Price was tournament MVP.

== Roster ==
2012–13 Western Kentucky Hilltoppers men's basketball team
Players
Coaches

| Pos. | # | Name | Height | Weight | Year | Hometown |
|---|---|---|---|---|---|---|
| F | 0 | Kene Anyigbo | 6 ft 5 in (1.96 m) | 250 lb (113 kg) | So | Bellaire, Texas |
| G | 1 | Kevin Kaspar | 6 ft 0 in (1.83 m) | 172 lb (78 kg) | So | Istanbul, Turkey |
| F | 2 | Eddie Alcantara | 6 ft 5 in (1.96 m) | 205 lb (93 kg) | Fr | Chicago, Illinois |
| F | 10 | Caden Dickerson | 6 ft 5 in (1.96 m) | 195 lb (88 kg) | Jr | Argyle, Texas |
| G | 11 | Spencer Sheldon | 5 ft 11 in (1.8 m) | 165 lb (75 kg) | So | Bowling Green, Kentucky |
| G | 12 | Brandon Harris | 6 ft 1 in (1.85 m) | 170 lb (77 kg) | Jr | Oklahoma City, Oklahoma |
| G | 13 | Percy Blade | 6 ft 4 in (1.93 m) | 200 lb (91 kg) | Fr | Louisville, Kentucky |
| G | 14 | Jamal Crook | 6 ft 3 in (1.91 m) | 175 lb (79 kg) | Sr | Louisville, Kentucky |
| F | 15 | O'Karo Akamune | 6 ft 7 in (2.01 m) | 210 lb (95 kg) | Jr | Miami, Florida |
| C | 20 | Aleksejs Rostov | 6 ft 10 in (2.08 m) | 225 lb (102 kg) | Fr | Riga, Latvia |
| F | 21 | Nigel Snipes | 6 ft 6 in (1.98 m) | 210 lb (95 kg) | So | Marietta, Georgia |
| F | 32 | Teeng Akol | 6 ft 11 in (2.11 m) | 220 lb (100 kg) | RS Sr | Wian, Sudan |
| F | 24 | Stephon Drane | 6 ft 7 in (2.01 m) | 225 lb (102 kg) | So | Raleigh, North Carolina |
| F | 44 | George Fant | 6 ft 6 in (1.98 m) | 240 lb (109 kg) | RS So | Bowling Green, Kentucky |
| G | 52 | T. J. Price | 6 ft 4 in (1.93 m) | 205 lb (93 kg) | So | Slidell, Louisiana |

Head coach

- Ray Harper (Kentucky Wesleyan)

Assistant coach(es)

- Lawrence Brenneman (Geneva)
- David Boyden (Western Kentucky)
- Phil Cunningham (Campbellsville)

Legend

- (C) Team captain
- (S) Suspended
- (I) Ineligible
- (W) Walk-on
- Injured
- Current redshirt

Roster
Last update: 2012-03-13

== Schedule ==
| Date time, TV | Rank^{#} | Opponent^{#} | Result | Record | Site (attendance) city, state |
Exhibition
| 10/29/2012*; 7:00 pm | | Campbellsville | W 84–46 | | E. A. Diddle Arena (3,671); Bowling Green, KY |
| 11/03/2012*; 7:00 pm | | Kentucky Wesleyan | W 83–71 | | E. A. Diddle Arena (4,576); Bowling Green, KY |
Regular Season
| 11/10/2012*; 7:30 pm | | at Southern Miss | L 64–67 ^{OT} | 0–1 | Reed Green Coliseum (7,097); Hattiesburg, MS |
| 11/13/2012*; 7:00 pm | | Austin Peay; Cancún Challenge | W 74–54 | 1–1 | E. A. Diddle Arena (4,160); Bowling Green, KY |
| 11/17/2012*; 7:30 pm | | Western Carolina; Cancún Challenge | W 92–81 | 2–1 | E. A. Diddle Arena (5,124); Bowling Green, KY |
| 11/20/2012*; 8:30 pm, CBSSN | | vs. Iowa; Cancún Challenge Semifinals | L 55–63 | 2–2 | Moon Palace Resort (902); Cancún, Mexico |
| 11/21/2012*; 6:00 pm, CBSSN | | vs. DePaul; Cancún Challenge 3rd Place Game | W 70–61 | 3–2 | Moon Palace Resort (902); Cancún, Mexico |
| 11/24/2012*; 7:30 pm | | Brescia | W 74–46 | 4–2 | E. A. Diddle Arena (4,062); Bowling Green, KY |
| 11/29/2012; 7:30 pm, ESPN3 | | at Louisiana–Monroe | W 65–54 | 5–2 (1–0) | Fant–Ewing Coliseum (1,517); Monroe, LA |
| 12/01/2012; 7:30 pm, ESPN3 | | at Troy | W 75–71 | 6–2 (2–0) | Trojan Arena (1,121); Troy, AL |
| 12/05/2012*; 7:00 pm, ESPN3 | | Southern Illinois | W 58–57 | 7–2 | E. A. Diddle Arena (3,833); Bowling Green, KY |
| 12/08/2012*; 3:00 pm, ESPN3 | | IUPUI | W 77–57 | 8–2 | E. A. Diddle Arena (4,255); Bowling Green, KY |
| 12/16/2012*; 2:00 pm, ESPN3 | | at Murray State | L 70–75 | 8–3 | CFSB Center (7,080); Murray, KY |
| 12/18/2012*; 6:00 pm, NBCSN | | at VCU | L 44–76 | 8–4 | Stuart C. Siegel Center (7,693); Richmond, VA |
| 12/22/2012*; 7:30 pm, ESPNU | | vs. No. 5 Louisville | L 55–78 ^{Vacated} | 8–5 | Bridgestone Arena (10,728); Nashville, TN |
| 12/27/2012; 7:00 pm, ESPN3 | | FIU | W 76–63 | 9–5 (3–0) | E. A. Diddle Arena (4,461); Bowling Green, KY |
| 12/29/2012; 7:00 pm, ESPN3 | | North Texas | W 70–64 | 10–5 (4–0) | E. A. Diddle Arena (4,776); Bowling Green, KY |
| 01/03/2013; 7:30 pm, ESPN3 | | at Arkansas–Little Rock | L 67–75 | 10–6 (4–1) | Jack Stephens Center (3,871); Little Rock, AR |
| 01/05/2013; 7:05 pm, ESPN3 | | at Arkansas State | L 61–75 | 10–7 (4–2) | Convocation Center (2,922); Jonesboro, AR |
| 01/12/2013; 7:00 pm, ESPN3 | | Florida Atlantic | L 62–65 | 10–8 (4–3) | E. A. Diddle Arena (4,823); Bowling Green, KY |
| 01/17/2013; 7:00 pm, ESPN3 | | Louisiana–Lafayette | W 72–49 | 11–8 (5–3) | E. A. Diddle Arena (4,914); Bowling Green, KY |
| 01/19/2013; 5:00 pm, ESPN3 | | Arkansas–Little Rock | L 54–59 | 11–9 (5–4) | E. A. Diddle Arena (5,221); Bowling Green, KY |
| 01/24/2013; 7:05 pm, ESPN3 | | at South Alabama | L 57–65 | 11–10 (5–5) | Mitchell Center (2,335); Mobile, AL |
| 01/26/2013; 3:00 pm, ESPN2 | | at Middle Tennessee | L 53–72 | 11–11 (5–6) | Murphy Center (10,105); Murfreesboro, TN |
| 01/31/2013; 7:00 pm, ESPN3 | | Troy | W 65–61 | 12–11 (6–6) | E. A. Diddle Arena (4,244); Bowling Green, KY |
| 02/07/2013; 7:00 pm | | at North Texas | W 70–59 | 13–11 (7–6) | The Super Pit (3,528); Denton, TX |
| 02/09/2013; 7:00 pm, ESPN3 | | Arkansas State | L 49–67 | 13–12 (7–7) | E. A. Diddle Arena (5,862); Bowling Green, KY |
| 02/14/2013; 6:00 pm, ESPN3 | | at Florida Atlantic | L 78–84 | 13–13 (7–8) | FAU Arena (1,331); Boca Raton, FL |
| 02/16/2013; 7:00 pm, ESPN3 | | at FIU | L 82–87 | 13–14 (7–9) | U.S. Century Bank Arena (1,422); Miami, FL |
| 02/21/2013; 7:00 pm, ESPN3 | | Louisiana–Monroe | W 75–57 | 14–14 (8–9) | E. A. Diddle Arena (3,623); Bowling Green, KY |
| 02/23/2013; 7:30 pm, ESPN3 | | at Louisiana–Lafayette | W 88–77 | 15–14 (9–9) | Cajundome (2,947); Lafayette, LA |
| 02/28/2013; 7:00 pm, ESPN3 | | South Alabama | W 79–73 | 16–14 (10–9) | E. A. Diddle Arena (4,024); Bowling Green, KY |
| 03/02/2013; 5:30 pm, ESPN3 | | Middle Tennessee | L 62–70 | 16–15 (10–10) | E. A. Diddle Arena (7,326); Bowling Green, KY |
2013 Sun Belt Conference men's basketball tournament
| 03/08/2013; 6:00 pm | (6) | vs. (11) Louisiana–Monroe; First Round | W 74–60 | 17–15 | Summit Arena (N/A); Hot Springs, AR |
| 03/09/2013; 8:30 pm | (6) | vs. (3) South Alabama; Quarterfinals | W 62–59 | 18–15 | Convention Center Court (N/A); Hot Springs, AR |
| 03/10/2013; 9:18 pm, ESPN3 | (6) | vs. (2) Arkansas State; Semifinals | W 58–56 | 19–15 | Summit Arena (N/A); Hot Springs, AR |
| 03/11/2013; 6:00 pm, ESPN | (6) | vs. (4) FIU; Championship game | W 65–63 | 20–15 | Summit Arena (N/A); Hot Springs, AR |
2013 NCAA tournament
| 03/22/2013*; 9:07 pm, TNT | (16 S) | vs. (1 S) No. 3 Kansas; Second Round | L 57–64 | 20–16 | Sprint Center (18,488); Kansas City, MO |
*Non-conference game. ^{#}Rankings from AP Poll. (#) Tournament seedings in parentheses. All times are in Central Time. (#) during NCAA Tournament is seed with Region S=South; Louisville’s win was later vacated by the NCAA due to recruiting violations by the Louisville basketball program..
