= 2012–13 Louisiana–Lafayette Ragin' Cajuns men's basketball team =

American college basketball season

2012–13 Louisiana–Lafayette Ragin' Cajuns men's basketball
- Conference: Sun Belt Conference
- West Division
- Record: 13–20 (8–12 Sun Belt)
- Head coach: Bob Marlin (3rd season)
- Assistant coaches: Neil Hardin; Kevin Johnson; Shawn Forrest
- Home arena: Cajundome

2012–13 Sun Belt Conference men's basketball standings
	Conf.				Overall
Team	W		L	PCT	W		L	PCT
East
Middle Tennessee	19	–	1	.950	28	–	6	.824
South Alabama	14	–	6	.700	17	–	13	.567
FIU	11	–	9	.550	18	–	14	.563
WKU †	10	–	10	.500	20	–	16	.556
Florida Atlantic	9	–	11	.450	14	–	18	.438
Troy	6	–	14	.300	12	–	21	.364
West
Arkansas State	12	–	8	.600	19	–	12	.613
Arkansas–Little Rock	11	–	9	.550	17	–	15	.531
Louisiana–Lafayette	8	–	12	.400	13	–	20	.394
North Texas	7	–	13	.350	12	–	20	.375
Louisiana–Monroe	3	–	17	.150	4	–	23	.148
† 2013 Sun Belt Tournament winner As of March 22, 2013; Rankings from AP Poll

The 2012–13 Louisiana–Lafayette Ragin' Cajuns men's basketball team represented the University of Louisiana at Lafayette during the 2012–13 NCAA Division I men's basketball season. The Ragin' Cajuns, led by third year head coach Bob Marlin, played their home games at the Cajundome and were members of the West Division of the Sun Belt Conference. They finished the season 13–20, 8–12 in Sun Belt play to finish in third place in the West Division. They lost in the quarterfinals of the Sun Belt tournament to Middle Tennessee.

== Roster ==
2012–13 Louisiana–Lafayette Ragin' Cajuns Men's Basketball Roster
Number	Name	Position	Height	Weight	Year	Hometown
0	Bryant Mbamulu	Guard	6–2	185	Junior	Houston, Texas
1	Cornell Barnett	Forward	6–7	220	Freshman	New Orleans, Louisiana
2	Elfrid Payton	Guard	6–3	165	Sophomore	Gretna, Louisiana
3	Josh Soto	Guard	6–4	210	Freshman	Gretna, Louisiana
4	Steven Wronkoski	Guard	6–5	185	Freshman	Hammond, Louisiana
5	Kasey Shepherd	Guard	6–3	165	Freshman	Houston, Texas
11	Donovan Williams	Guard	6–0	180	Sophomore	Cecilia, Louisiana
13	Alan-Michael Thompson	Guard	6–1	170	Senior	Florence, South Carolina
21	Shawn Long	Forward	6–9	250	Freshman	Morgan City, Louisiana
22	Elridge Moore	Forward	6–5	195	Junior	New Orleans, Louisiana
31	Kevin Brown	Guard	6–0	200	Sophomore	Houston, Texas
32	Aaron Leblanc	Forward	6–5	185	Junior	Baldwin, Louisiana
35	Braylon Lazare	Forward	6–5	210	Junior	Baton Rouge, Louisiana
44	Matthew Moss	Forward	6–9	240	Freshman	Anacoco, Louisiana

== Schedule ==
Date time, TV	Opponent	Result	Record	High points	High rebounds	High assists	Site (attendance) city, state
Exhibition
11/06/2012*; 7:00 pm	Loyola–New Orleans	W 92–72		--- – ---	--- – ---	--- – ---	Cajundome (1,459); Lafayette, LA
Regular season
11/11/2012*; 4:00 pm	Oakland	W 90–79	1–0	15 – Moore	6 – Long	8 – Payton	Cajundome (2,025); Lafayette, LA
11/16/2012*; 7:00 pm	at Texas Southern	L 71–74 ^{OT}	1–1	20 – Long	13 – Long	4 – Payton	H&PE Arena (1,204); Houston, TX
11/18/2012*; 2:00 pm	at Boise State	L 57–63	1–2	12 – Payton	6 – Payton	5 – Payton	Taco Bell Arena (2,882); Boise, ID
11/21/2012*; 7:00 pm	Southern–New Orleans	W 76–66	2–2	22 – Long	12 – Long	7 – Payton	Cajundome (1,995); Lafayette, LA
11/23/2012*; 8:30 pm	at New Mexico State	L 57–79	2–3	16 – Wronkoski	7 – Mbamalu	5 – Shephard	Pan American Center (5,291); Las Cruces, NM
11/25/2012*; 11:00 am, ESPN3	at No. 15 Michigan State	L 60–63	2–4	20 – Payton	8 – Long	2 – Mbamalu	Breslin Student Events Center (14,797); East Lansing, MI
11/29/2012; 7:00 pm	Middle Tennessee	L 58–72	2–5 (0–1)	17 – Long	13 – Long	6 – Payton	Cajundome (1,881); Lafayette, LA
12/01/2012; 7:00 pm	at North Texas	W 80–76	3–5 (1–1)	27 – Long	11 – Tied	9 – Payton	The Super Pit (3,631); Denton, TX
12/08/2012*; 7:00 pm	at McNeese State	L 72–77	3–6	17 – Payton	17 – Long	7 – Payton	Burton Coliseum (1,165); Lake Charles, LA
12/11/2012*; 7:00 pm	Lamar	W 77–60	4–6	18 – Thompson	11 – Long	3 – Payton	Cajundome (2,059); Lafayette, LA
12/15/2012*; 7:00 pm	at Houston	L 63–85	4–7	20 – Long	6 – Payton	5 – Mbamalu	Hofheinz Pavilion (3,268); Houston, TX
12/18/2012*; 7:00 pm	Robert Morris	L 61–66	4–8	21 – Mbamalu	13 – Long	3 – Payton	Cajundome (1,856); Lafayette, LA
12/22/2012*; 7:00 pm	Duquesne	W 91–79	5–8	23 – Long	14 – Long	4 – Payton	Cajundome (1,464); Lafayette, LA
12/27/2012; 7:05 pm	at Arkansas State	L 70–87	5–9 (1–2)	20 – Payton	8 – Long	5 – Payton	Convocation Center (2,734); Jonesboro, AR
12/29/2013; 7:45 pm	Arkansas–Little Rock	W 79–70	6–9 (2–2)	26 – Mbamalu	13 – Long	6 – Payton	Cajundome (2,436); Lafayette, LA
01/03/2013; 6:00 pm	at Florida Atlantic	L 70–75	6–10 (2–3)	23 – Payton	9 – Long	3 – Payton	FAU Arena (1,063); Boca Raton, FL
01/05/2013; 6:30 pm	at FIU	L 70–75	6–11 (2–4)	23 – Mbamalu	9 – Payton	10 – Payton	U.S. Century Bank Arena (855); Miami, FL
01/10/2013; 7:00 pm	South Alabama	L 89–91 ^{2OT}	6–12 (2–5)	26 – Payton	14 – Long	7 – Payton	Cajundome (2,037); Lafayette, LA
01/12/2013; 7:15 pm	Arkansas State	W 61–56	7–12 (3–5)	17 – Long	16 – Long	4 – Payton	Cajundome (3,040); Lafayette, LA
01/17/2013; 7:00 pm, ESPN3	at Western Kentucky	L 49–72	7–13 (3–6)	14 – Payton	14 – Long	3 – Payton	E. A. Diddle Arena (4,914); Bowling Green, KY
01/19/2013; 5:30 pm	at Middle Tennessee	L 60–82	7–14 (3–7)	21 – Long	13 – Long	3 – Payton	Murphy Center (5,220); Murfreesboro, TN
01/24/2013; 7:00 pm	FIU	L 75–80	7–15 (3–8)	22 – Payton	14 – Long	7 – Payton	Cajundome (2,173); Lafayette, LA
01/31/2013; 7:00 pm	North Texas	W 105–74	8–15 (4–8)	24 – Payton	13 – Long	9 – Payton	Cajundome (2,294); Lafayette, LA
02/02/2013; 7:30 pm	at Troy	L 52–71	8–16 (4–9)	16 – Mbamalu	11 – Long	4 – Payton	Trojan Arena (2,753); Troy, AL
02/10/2013; 7:45 pm	Louisiana–Monroe	W 90–66	9–16 (5–9)	24 – Mbamalu	11 – Long	7 – Payton	Cajundome (2,131); Lafayette, LA
02/14/2013; 7:05 pm	at South Alabama	L 64–88	9–17 (5–10)	17 – Payton	8 – Long	7 – Payton	Mitchell Center (1,726); Mobile, AL
02/16/2013; 7:15 pm	Florida Atlantic	W 58–57	10–17 (6–10)	16 – Long	8 – Payton	5 – Payton	Cajundome (2,370); Lafayette, LA
02/21/2013; 7:00 pm	Troy	W 76–66	11–17 (7–10)	23 – Payton	9 – Long	5 – Payton	Cajundome (1,919); Lafayette, LA
02/23/2013; 7:30 pm, ESPN3	Western Kentucky	L 77–88	11–18 (7–11)	31 – Payton	13 – Long	3 – Payton	Cajundome (2,947); Lafayette, LA
02/28/2013; 7:30 pm	at Arkansas–Little Rock	L 68–77	11–19 (7–12)	19 – Long	8 – Long	8 – Payton	Jack Stephens Center (3,577); Little Rock, AR
03/02/2013; 4:20 pm	at Louisiana–Monroe	W 71–63	12–19 (8–12)	17 – Long	10 – Long	8 – Payton	Fant–Ewing Coliseum (1,281); Monroe, LA
2013 Sun Belt tournament
03/08/2013; 6:30 pm	vs. North Texas; First Round	W 74–55	13–19	20 – Payton	11 – Long	7 – Payton	Convention Center Court (N/A); Hot Springs, AR
03/09/2013; 6:30 pm, ESPN3	vs. Middle Tennessee; Quarterfinals	L 66–81	13–20	17 – Thompson	7 – Long	6 – Payton	Summit Arena (N/A); Hot Springs, AR
*Non-conference game. ^{#}Rankings from AP Poll. (#) Tournament seedings in parentheses. All times are in Central Time.
