= 2012–13 FIU Panthers men's basketball team =

American college basketball season

2012–13 FIU Panthers men's basketball
- Conference: Sun Belt Conference
- East Division
- Record: 18–14 (11–9 Sun Belt)
- Head coach: Richard Pitino (1st season)
- Assistant coaches: Mark Lieberman; Mike Balado; Kimani Young
- Home arena: U.S. Century Bank Arena

2012–13 Sun Belt Conference men's basketball standings
	Conf.				Overall
Team	W		L	PCT	W		L	PCT
East
Middle Tennessee	19	–	1	.950	28	–	6	.824
South Alabama	14	–	6	.700	17	–	13	.567
FIU	11	–	9	.550	18	–	14	.563
WKU †	10	–	10	.500	20	–	16	.556
Florida Atlantic	9	–	11	.450	14	–	18	.438
Troy	6	–	14	.300	12	–	21	.364
West
Arkansas State	12	–	8	.600	19	–	12	.613
Arkansas–Little Rock	11	–	9	.550	17	–	15	.531
Louisiana–Lafayette	8	–	12	.400	13	–	20	.394
North Texas	7	–	13	.350	12	–	20	.375
Louisiana–Monroe	3	–	17	.150	4	–	23	.148
† 2013 Sun Belt Tournament winner As of March 22, 2013; Rankings from AP Poll

The 2012–13 FIU Panthers men's basketball team represented Florida International University during the 2012–13 NCAA Division I men's basketball season. The Panthers, led by first year head coach Richard Pitino, played their home games at U.S. Century Bank Arena, and were members of the East Division of the Sun Belt Conference. They finished the season 18–14, 11–9 in Sun Belt play to finish in third place in the East Division. They advanced to the championship game of the Sun Belt tournament where they lost to WKU. Despite the 18 wins, they did not participate in a post season tournament.

This was the Panthers finals season as a member of the Sun Belt. In July, 2013, they joined Conference USA.

== Roster ==
Number	Name	Position	Height	Weight	Year	Hometown
0	Manuel Nunez	Guard	6–5	190	Senior	Miami, Florida
1	Deric Hill	Guard	5–9	160	Sophomore	Miami, Florida
2	Marco Porcher Jimenez	Guard	6–4	185	Sophomore	Málaga, Spain
3	Jerome Frink	Forward	6–6	190	Freshman	Jersey City, New Jersey
4	Cody Mann	Guard	6–0	160	Sophomore	Miami, Florida
5	Steven Miro	Guard	6–3	190	Junior	Bayamón, Puerto Rico
10	Cameron Bell	Guard	6–3	185	Senior	West Bloomfield, Michigan
11	Dennis Mavin	Guard	6–3	183	Junior	Gainesville, Florida
12	Gaby Belardo	Guard	6–2	180	Senior	San Juan, Puerto Rico
14	Juan Ferrales	Guard	6–2	190	Sophomore	Pembroke Pines, Florida
15	Tymell Murphy	Forward	6–5	210	Junior	Brooklyn, New York
20	Rakeem Buckles	Forward	6–7	215	Senior	Miami, Florida
22	Raymond Taylor	Guard	5–6	145	Senior	Miami, Florida
24	Malik Smith	Guard	6–2	170	Junior	Boston, Massachusetts
25	Ivan Jurkovic	Center	7–0	245	Junior	Zagreb, Croatia
32	Dee Lewis	Guard	6–3	195	Freshman	Ocala, Florida
33	Tola Akomolafe	Forward	6–6	210	Senior	El Paso, Texas
34	Joey De La Rosa	Center	6–11	240	Sophomore	The Bronx, New York

== Schedule ==
Date time, TV	Opponent	Result	Record	Site (attendance) city, state
Regular season
11/11/2012*; 2:00 pm, ESPN3	at Boston College	L 70–84	0–1	Conte Forum (2,811); Chestnut Hill, MA
11/17/2012*; 2:00 pm	Stephen F. Austin	L 60–69	0–2	U.S. Century Bank Arena (971); Miami, FL
11/24/2012*; 7:00 pm	at Coastal Carolina	W 87–77	1–2	HTC Center (1,639); Conway, SC
11/29/2012; 7:30 pm	Arkansas State	W 80–61	2–2 (1–0)	U.S. Century Bank Arena (774); Miami, FL
12/01/2012; 7:30 pm	South Alabama	L 68–79	2–3 (1–1)	U.S. Century Bank Arena (920); Miami, FL
12/09/2012*; 2:00 pm	at Stetson	W 82–79	3–3	Edmunds Center (647); DeLand, FL
12/13/2012*; 7:00 pm	at Florida Gulf Coast	L 73–76	3–4	Alico Arena (1,803); Fort Myers, FL
12/19/2012*; 7:00 pm, WHAS/ESPN3	at No. 5 Louisville	L 55–79	3–5	KFC Yum! Center (21,411); Louisville, KY
12/22/2012*; 2:00 pm	at Texas Southern	W 48–45	4–5	Health and Physical Education Arena (315); Houston, TX
12/27/2012; 8:00 pm, ESPN3	at WKU	L 63–76	4–6 (1–2)	E. A. Diddle Arena (4,461); Bowling Green, KY
12/29/2012; 6:00 pm	at Middle Tennessee	L 52–69	4–7 (1–3)	Murphy Center (3,422); Murfreesboro, TN
01/02/2013*; 7:00 pm	Florida A&M	W 88–72	5–7	U.S. Century Bank Arena (778); Miami, FL
01/05/2013; 7:30 pm	Louisiana–Lafayette	W 75–70	6–7 (2–3)	U.S. Century Bank Arena (855); Miami, FL
01/07/2013*; 1:00 pm	Bethune-Cookman	W 74–72	7–7	U.S. Century Bank Arena (828); Miami, FL
01/10/2013; 8:05 pm	at Arkansas State	W 66–64	8–7 (3–3)	Convocation Center (2,870); Jonesboro, AR
01/12/2013; 4:30 pm, SBN/ESPN3	at Arkansas–Little Rock	L 76–88	8–8 (3–4)	Jack Stephens Center (3,318); Little Rock, AR
01/17/2013; 7:50 pm	North Texas	W 70–64	9–8 (4–4)	U.S. Century Bank Arena (1,109); Miami, FL
01/19/2013; 8:00 pm	Troy	W 61–55	10–8 (5–4)	U.S. Century Bank Arena (1,063); Miami, FL
01/24/2013; 8:00 pm	at Louisiana–Lafayette	W 80–75	11–8 (6–4)	Cajundome (2,173); Lafayette, LA
01/27/2013; 5:05 pm	at South Alabama	L 58–60	11–9 (6–5)	Mitchell Center (2,147); Mobile, AL
01/31/2013; 7:40 pm	Middle Tennessee	L 64–66	11–10 (6–6)	U.S. Century Bank Arena (1,143); Miami, FL
02/02/2013; 7:50 pm	Louisiana–Monroe	W 76–73	12–10 (7–6)	U.S. Century Bank Arena (1,121); Miami, FL
02/07/2013; 7:00 pm	Florida Atlantic	W 84–65	13–10 (8–6)	U.S. Century Bank Arena (1,532); Miami, FL
02/09/2013; 8:00 pm	at North Texas	L 67–77	13–11 (8–7)	The Super Pit (5,497); Denton, TX
02/14/2013; 8:30 pm	at Troy	L 61–69	13–12 (8–8)	Trojan Arena (1,563); Troy, AL
02/16/2013; 8:00 pm, ESPN3	WKU	W 87–82	14–12 (9–8)	U.S. Century Bank Arena (1,422); Miami, FL
02/21/2013; 7:45 pm	Arkansas–Little Rock	W 65–52	15–12 (10–8)	U.S. Century Bank Arena (1,207); Miami, FL
02/28/2013; 8:30 pm	at Louisiana–Monroe	W 67–58	16–12 (11–8)	Fant–Ewing Coliseum (1,221); Monroe, LA
03/02/2013; 7:00 pm	at Florida Atlantic	L 60–77	16–13 (11–9)	FAU Arena (2,118); Boca Raton, FL
2013 Sun Belt tournament
03/09/2013; 7:00 pm	vs. Arkansas–Little Rock; Quarterfinals	W 69–54	17–13	Convention Center Court (N/A); Hot Springs, AR
03/10/2013; 7:30 pm, ESPN3	vs. Middle Tennessee; Semifinals	W 61–57	18–13	Summit Arena (N/A); Hot Springs, AR
03/11/2013; 7:00 pm, ESPN	vs. WKU; Championship Game	L 63–65	18–14	Summit Arena (N/A); Hot Springs, AR
*Non-conference game. ^{#}Rankings from AP Poll. (#) Tournament seedings in parentheses. All times are in Eastern Time.
