= Coaches vs. Cancer =

Coaches vs. Cancer may refer to:

- The Empire Classic, an annual American college basketball tournament known from 1995 to 2011 as the Coaches vs. Cancer Classic
- The Coaches vs. Cancer Classic, an annual American college basketball tournament held from 2012 to 2014
