= 2012–13 North Carolina Tar Heels men's basketball team =

American college basketball season

2012–13 North Carolina Tar Heels men's basketball

NCAA tournament, Round of 32
- Conference: Atlantic Coast Conference
- Record: 25–11 (12–6 ACC)
- Head coach: Roy Williams (10th season)
- Assistant coaches: Steve Robinson (10th season); C. B. McGrath (10th season); Hubert Davis (1st season)
- Home arena: Dean E. Smith Center

2012–13 ACC men's basketball standings
	Conf.				Overall
Team	W		L	PCT	W		L	PCT
No. 5 Miami (FL) †	15	–	3	.833	29	–	7	.806
No. 6 Duke	14	–	4	.778	30	–	6	.833
North Carolina	12	–	6	.667	25	–	11	.694
Virginia	11	–	7	.611	23	–	12	.657
NC State	11	–	7	.611	24	–	11	.686
Florida State	9	–	9	.500	18	–	16	.529
Maryland	8	–	10	.444	25	–	13	.658
Boston College	7	–	11	.389	16	–	17	.485
Georgia Tech	6	–	12	.333	16	–	15	.516
Wake Forest	6	–	12	.333	13	–	18	.419
Clemson	5	–	13	.278	13	–	18	.419
Virginia Tech	4	–	14	.222	13	–	19	.406
† 2013 ACC tournament winner As of April 2, 2013; Rankings from AP Poll

The 2012–13 North Carolina Tar Heels men's basketball team represented the University of North Carolina at Chapel Hill in the 2012–13 NCAA Division I men's basketball season. The team's head coach was Roy Williams, who is in his 10th season as UNC's head men's basketball coach. They played their home games at the Dean E. Smith Center and were members of the Atlantic Coast Conference. They finished the season 25–11, 12–6 in ACC play to finish in third place. They advanced to the championship game of the ACC tournament where they lost to Miami (FL). They received an at-large bid to the 2013 NCAA tournament where they defeated Villanova in the second round before, in the third round, having their season ended for the second consecutive year by Kansas.

== Pre-season ==
=== Departures ===
Name	Number	Pos.	Height	Weight	Year	Hometown	Notes
Harrison Barnes	40	F	6'8"	210	Sophomore	Ames, Iowa	NBA draft
Kendall Marshall	5	G	6'3"	186	Sophomore	Dumfries, Virginia	NBA draft
John Henson	31	F	6'10"	210	Junior	Tampa, Florida	NBA draft
Tyler Zeller	44	F	7'0"	250	Senior	Washington, Indiana	Graduated/NBA draft
Justin Watts	24	G	6'4"	210	Senior	Durham, North Carolina	Graduated
David Dupont	22	F	6'5"	195	Senior	Greensboro, North Carolina	Graduated
Patrick Crouch	30	G	5'11"	175	Senior	Asheville, North Carolina	Graduated
Stewart Cooper	34	F	6'5"	205	Senior	Winston-Salem, North Carolina	Graduated
Stilman White	11	G	6'0"	170	Freshman	Wilmington, North Carolina	LDS mission

=== Recruits ===
College recruiting information
Name	Hometown	School	Height	Weight	Commit date
Marcus Paige; PG	Marion, Iowa	Linn-Mar High School	6 ft 0 in (1.83 m)	155 lb (70 kg)	Jan 8, 2011
Marcus Paige; PG	Recruit ratings: Scout: Rivals: ESPN: (96)				
Brice Johnson; PF	Cordova, South Carolina	Edisto High School	6 ft 9 in (2.06 m)	195 lb (88 kg)	Oct 26, 2011
Brice Johnson; PF	Recruit ratings: Scout: Rivals: ESPN: (96)				
Joel James; C	Fort Lauderdale, Florida	Dwyer High School	6 ft 10 in (2.08 m)	270 lb (120 kg)	Oct 2, 2011
Joel James; C	Recruit ratings: Scout: Rivals: ESPN: (94)				
J. P. Tokoto; SF	Menomonee Falls, Wisconsin	Menomonee Falls High School	6 ft 6 in (1.98 m)	185 lb (84 kg)	Mar 3, 2011
J. P. Tokoto; SF	Recruit ratings: Scout: Rivals: ESPN: (93)				
Overall recruit ranking: Scout: 8 Rivals: 9 ESPN: 8
Note: In many cases, Scout, Rivals, 247Sports, On3, and ESPN may conflict in their listings of height and weight.; In these cases, the average was taken. ESPN grades are on a 100-point scale.; Sources: "North Carolina 2012 Basketball Commitments". Rivals.; "2012 North Carolina Commits". Scout.; "ESPN". ESPN.; "Scout.com Team Recruiting Rankings". Scout.; "2012 Team Ranking". Rivals.

Coach Williams adjusted his line-up starting with the game against Duke on 13 February 2013. He went with a smaller line-up with four guards and moved P.J. Hairston into the starting five.

== Roster ==
2012–13 North Carolina Tar Heels men's basketball team
Players
Coaches

Pos.	#	Name	Height	Weight	Year	Previous school	Hometown
F	0	Joel James	6 ft 10 in (2.08 m)	260 lb (118 kg)	Fr	Dwyer H.S.	West Palm Beach, FL
G	1	Dexter Strickland (C)	6 ft 3 in (1.91 m)	180 lb (82 kg)	Sr	St. Patrick H.S.	Rahway, NJ
G	2	Leslie McDonald	6 ft 5 in (1.96 m)	215 lb (98 kg)	RS Jr	Briarcrest Christian School	Memphis, TN
G	3	Wade Moody (W)	6 ft 0 in (1.83 m)	175 lb (79 kg)	Jr	Mount Airy H.S.	Mount Airy, NC
G	4	Luke Davis	6 ft 0 in (1.83 m)	172 lb (78 kg)	RS So	Ravenscroft School	Raleigh, NC
G	5	Marcus Paige	6 ft 0.5 in (1.84 m)	157 lb (71 kg)	Fr	Linn-Mar H.S.	Marion, IA
F	11	Brice Johnson	6 ft 9 in (2.06 m)	187 lb (85 kg)	Fr	Edisto H.S.	Orangeburg, SC
F	14	Desmond Hubert	6 ft 9.5 in (2.07 m)	220 lb (100 kg)	So	New Egypt H.S.	Cream Ridge, NJ
G	15	P. J. Hairston	6 ft 5.5 in (1.97 m)	220 lb (100 kg)	So	Hargrave Military Academy	Greensboro, NC
F	21	Jackson Simmons	6 ft 7 in (2.01 m)	220 lb (100 kg)	So	Smoky Mountain H.S.	Webster, NC
F	22	Frank Tanner (W)	6 ft 4 in (1.93 m)	210 lb (95 kg)	Sr	Hickory Ridge H.S.	Charlotte, NC
F	25	J. P. Tokoto	6 ft 5 in (1.96 m)	185 lb (84 kg)	Fr	Menomonee Falls H.S.	Menomonee Falls, WI
F	30	James Manor (W)	6 ft 6 in (1.98 m)	210 lb (95 kg)	Jr	Chapel Hill H.S.	Carrboro, NC
F	34	Denzel Robinson (W)	6 ft 4 in (1.93 m)	215 lb (98 kg)	Jr	Chapel Hill H.S.	Chapel Hill, NC
G	35	Reggie Bullock	6 ft 7 in (2.01 m)	205 lb (93 kg)	Jr	Kinston H.S.	Kinston, NC
F	43	James Michael McAdoo	6 ft 9 in (2.06 m)	230 lb (104 kg)	So	Norfolk Christian H.S.	Norfolk, VA

Head coach

- Roy Williams (North Carolina)

Assistant coach(es)

- Steve Robinson (Radford)
- C. B. McGrath (Kansas)
- Hubert Davis (North Carolina)

Legend

- (C) Team captain
- (S) Suspended
- (I) Ineligible
- (W) Walk-on
- Injured
- Current redshirt

Roster
Last update: 2012-11-09

- Note that the roster is subject to change.

== Schedule and results ==
Date time, TV	Rank^{#}	Opponent^{#}	Result	Record	High points	High rebounds	High assists	Site (attendance) city, state
Exhibition
October 26, 2012*; 6:30 pm	No. 11	Shaw	W 81–54	–	16 – McAdoo	8 – McAdoo	5 – Bullock	Dean E. Smith Center (–); Chapel Hill, NC
Non-conference regular season
November 9, 2012*; 7:00 pm, RSN	No. 11	Gardner–Webb	W 76–59	1–0	26 – McAdoo	14 – McAdoo	3 – Bullock, Hairston	Dean E. Smith Center (16,430); Chapel Hill, NC
November 11, 2012*; 2:30 pm, ESPNU	No. 11	Florida Atlantic; 2012 Maui Invitational Tournament	W 80–56	2–0	19 – McAdoo	11 – McAdoo	6 – Paige	Dean E. Smith Center (15,403); Chapel Hill, NC
November 16, 2012*; 11:00 pm, ESPNU	No. 11	at Long Beach State	W 78–63	3–0	18 – McAdoo	9 – McAdoo, James	6 – Strickland	Walter Pyramid (6,912); Long Beach, CA
November 19, 2012*; 6:00 pm, ESPN2	No. 9	vs. Mississippi State; 2012 Maui Invitational Tournament	W 95–49	4–0	21 – McDonald	8 – Johnson	5 – Strickland	Lahaina Civic Center (2,400); Maui, HI
November 20, 2012*; 8 p.m., ESPN	No. 9	vs. Butler; 2012 Maui Invitational Tournament	L 71–82	4–1	15 – Hairston	7 – Hairston	5 – Paige	Lahaina Civic Center (2,400); Maui, HI
November 21, 2012*; 7:30 p.m., ESPN2	No. 9	vs. Chaminade; 2012 Maui Invitational Tournament	W 112–70	5–1	18 – McAdoo	10 – McAdoo	7 – Davis	Lahaina Civic Center (2,400); Maui, HI
November 27, 2012*; 9:30 pm, ESPN	No. 14	at No. 1 Indiana; ACC–Big Ten Challenge	L 59–83	5–2	14 – Strickland	9 – McAdoo, Bullock	3 – Strickland, Paige	Assembly Hall (17,472); Bloomington, IN
December 1, 2012*; 6:00 pm, ESPNU	No. 14	UAB	W 102–84	6–2	24 – McDonald	12 – McAdoo	9 – Strickland	Dean E. Smith Center (15,906); Chapel Hill, NC
December 8, 2012*; 7:30 pm, ESPN3	No. 20	East Tennessee State	W 78–55	7–2	14 – McDonald	8 – Johnson	7 – Paige	Dean E. Smith Center (17,307); Chapel Hill, NC
December 15, 2012*; 12:00 pm, ESPNU	No. 21	East Carolina	W 93–87	8–2	19 – McAdoo	7 – Bullock, McAdoo	10 – Strickland	Dean E. Smith Center (19,147); Chapel Hill, NC
December 19, 2012*; 9:00 pm, ESPN2	No. 23	at Texas	L 67–85	8–3	18 – Bullock	13 – Bullock	5 – Paige	Frank Erwin Center (13,134); Austin, TX
December 22, 2012*; 12:00 pm, ESPNU	No. 23	McNeese State	W 97–63	9–3	20 – Hairston	8 – Hairston	9 – Paige	Dean E. Smith Center (18,258); Chapel Hill, NC
December 29, 2012*; 2:00 pm, ESPN2		No. 20 UNLV	W 79–73	10–3	16 – Strickland	9 – McAdoo	4 – Hairston	Dean E. Smith Center (20,888); Chapel Hill, NC
ACC Regular Season
January 6, 2013; 8:00 pm, ESPNU		at Virginia	L 52–61	10–4 (0–1)	22 – Bullock	7 – McAdoo	3 – Strickland	John Paul Jones Arena (12,117); Charlottesville, VA
January 10, 2013; 7:00 pm, ESPN		Miami (FL)	L 59–68	10–5 (0–2)	14 – McAdoo	6 – Bullock, McAdoo	5 – Bullock, Paige	Dean E. Smith Center (20,516); Chapel Hill, NC
January 12, 2013; 2:00 pm, ESPN		at Florida State	W 77–72	11–5 (1–2)	23 – Hairston	8 – McAdoo, Bullock	4 – Bullock, Paige	Donald L. Tucker Center (12,060); Tallahassee, FL
January 19, 2013; 12:00 pm, ESPN		Maryland	W 62–52	12–5 (2–2)	24 – Bullock	11 – McAdoo	6 – Paige	Dean E. Smith Center (20,865); Chapel Hill, NC
January 23, 2013; 9:00 pm, ESPN		Georgia Tech	W 79–63	13–5 (3–2)	17 – Bullock	9 – McAdoo	6 – Strickland, Paige	Dean E. Smith Center (19,124); Chapel Hill, NC
January 26, 2013; 7:00 pm, ESPN		at No. 18 NC State; ESPN College GameDay	L 83–91	13–6 (3–3)	19 – Hairston	11 – McAdoo	6 – Strickland	PNC Arena (19,577); Raleigh, NC
January 29, 2013; 9:00 pm, ESPNU		at Boston College	W 82–70	14–6 (4–3)	17 – McAdoo	10 – McAdoo	6 – Paige	Conte Forum (7,062); Chestnut Hill, MA
February 2, 2013; 12:00 pm, ACCN/ESPN3		Virginia Tech	W 72–60 ^{OT}	15–6 (5–3)	22 – McAdoo	10 – McAdoo	5 – Bullock, Paige	Dean E. Smith Center (20,762); Chapel Hill, NC
February 5, 2013; 7:00 pm, ESPNU		Wake Forest	W 87–62	16–6 (6–3)	23 – Bullock	6 – Paige	5 – Strickland	Dean E. Smith Center (19,653); Chapel Hill, NC
February 9, 2013; 2:00 pm, ESPN		at No. 8 Miami (FL)	L 61–87	16–7 (6–4)	14 – Bullock	7 – Bullock	4 – Paige	BankUnited Center (7,972); Coral Gables, FL
February 13, 2013; 9:00 pm, ESPN/ACCN		at No. 2 Duke; Rivalry	L 68–73	16–8 (6–5)	23 – Hairston	8 – McAdoo, Bullock, Hairston	3 – Hairston	Cameron Indoor Stadium (9,314); Durham, NC
February 16, 2013; 12:00 pm, ACCN/ESPN3		Virginia	W 93–81	17–8 (7–5)	29 – Hairston	10 – McAdoo	6 – Strickland	Dean E. Smith Center (20,616); Chapel Hill, NC
February 19, 2013; 9:00 pm, ACCN/ESPN3		at Georgia Tech	W 70–58	18–8 (8–5)	22 – McAdoo	11 – McAdoo	7 – Strickland	McCamish Pavilion (8,600); Atlanta, GA
February 23, 2013; 4:00 pm, ESPN		NC State	W 76–65	19–8 (9–5)	22 – Bullock	13 – Bullock	8 – Paige	Dean E. Smith Center (21,750); Chapel Hill, NC
February 28, 2013; 7:00 pm, ESPN		at Clemson	W 68–59	20–8 (10–5)	16 – Strickland	9 – Bullock	6 – Bullock	Littlejohn Coliseum (9,778); Clemson, SC
March 3, 2013; 2:00 pm, CBS		Florida State	W 79–58	21–8 (11–5)	21 – McAdoo	10 – Bullock	9 – Paige	Dean E. Smith Center (21,228); Chapel Hill, NC
March 6, 2013; 7:00 pm, ESPN		at Maryland	W 79–68	22–8 (12–5)	22 – Hairston	12 – Bullock	6 – Strickland	Comcast Center (17,950); College Park, MD
March 9, 2013; 9:00 pm, ESPN		No. 3 Duke; College GameDay/Rivalry	L 53–69	22–9 (12–6)	15 – McAdoo	6 – Bullock, Hairston	6 – Paige	Dean E. Smith Center (21,750); Chapel Hill, NC
2013 ACC Tournament
March 15, 2013; 9:42 pm, ACCN/ESPN2	(3)	vs. (6) Florida State; Quarterfinals	W 83–62	23–9	21 – Hairston	9 – Bullock	10 – Paige	Greensboro Coliseum (N/A); Greensboro, NC
March 16, 2013; 3:45 pm, ACCN/ESPN	(3)	vs. (7) Maryland; Semifinals	W 79–76	24–9	15 – Bullock, Strickland	9 – Bullock	4 – Bullock, Strickland	Greensboro Coliseum (22,169); Greensboro, NC
March 17, 2013; 1:00 pm, ACCN/ESPN	(3)	vs. (1) No. 9 Miami (FL); Championship Game	L 77–87	24–10	28 – Hairston	7 – Bullock	8 – Strickland	Greensboro Coliseum (22,169); Greensboro, NC
2013 NCAA Tournament
March 22, 2013*; 7:20 pm, TNT	(8 S)	vs. (9 S) Villanova; Second Round	W 78–71	25–10	23 – Hairston	5 – Hairston	4 – Bullock, Paige	Sprint Center (18,488); Kansas City, MO
March 24, 2013*; 5:25 pm, CBS	(8 S)	vs. (1 S) No. 3 Kansas; Third Round	L 58–70	25–11	15 – Hairston	9 – Hairston	4 – Strickland	Sprint Center (18,498); Kansas City, MO
*Non-conference game. ^{#}Rankings from AP Poll. (#) Tournament seedings in parentheses. All times are in Eastern Time. (#) during NCAA Tournament is seed with Region S=South.

== Rankings ==
Poll	11/30/12	12/31/12	1/31/13	2/25/13	3/1/13	3/10/13	3/17/13
RPI	51	23	34	21	18	18	18
Basketball Power Index (BPI)							32
NCAA seed list							29

== Team players drafted into the NBA ==
Year	Round	Pick	Player	NBA club
2013	1	25	Reggie Bullock	Los Angeles Clippers
2014	1	26	P. J. Hairston	Miami Heat
2015	2	58	J. P. Tokoto	Philadelphia 76ers
2016	1	25	Brice Johnson	Los Angeles Clippers
2016	2	55	Marcus Paige	Brooklyn Nets
