= 2012–13 Florida State Seminoles men's basketball team =

American college basketball season

2012–13 Florida State Seminoles men's basketball

Coaches vs. Cancer Classic Champions

NIT, First Round
- Conference: Atlantic Coast Conference
- Record: 18–16 (9–9 ACC)
- Head coach: Leonard Hamilton (11th year)
- Assistant coaches: Stan Jones; Dennis Gates; Corey Williams
- Home arena: Donald L. Tucker Center (Capacity: 12,100)

2012–13 ACC men's basketball standings
	Conf.				Overall
Team	W		L	PCT	W		L	PCT
No. 5 Miami (FL) †	15	–	3	.833	29	–	7	.806
No. 6 Duke	14	–	4	.778	30	–	6	.833
North Carolina	12	–	6	.667	25	–	11	.694
Virginia	11	–	7	.611	23	–	12	.657
NC State	11	–	7	.611	24	–	11	.686
Florida State	9	–	9	.500	18	–	16	.529
Maryland	8	–	10	.444	25	–	13	.658
Boston College	7	–	11	.389	16	–	17	.485
Georgia Tech	6	–	12	.333	16	–	15	.516
Wake Forest	6	–	12	.333	13	–	18	.419
Clemson	5	–	13	.278	13	–	18	.419
Virginia Tech	4	–	14	.222	13	–	19	.406
† 2013 ACC tournament winner As of April 2, 2013; Rankings from AP Poll

The 2012–13 Florida State Seminoles men's basketball team represented Florida State University in the 2012–13 NCAA Division I men's basketball season The Seminoles were led by eleventh year head coach Leonard Hamilton and played their home games at the Donald L. Tucker Center on the university's Tallahassee, Florida campus. They were members of the Atlantic Coast Conference.

The Seminoles finished the season 18–16, 9–9 in ACC play, to finish in sixth place. They lost in the quarterfinals of the ACC tournament to North Carolina. They were invited to the 2013 National Invitation Tournament where they lost in the first round to Louisiana Tech.

== Previous season ==
The Seminoles finished the 2011–12 season 25–10, 12–4 in ACC play, and lost in the 3rd round of the NCAA tournament to Cincinnati. Florida State ended the season ranked 10th in the AP Poll and 12th in the Coaches' Poll.

== Preseason ==
=== Departures ===
Name	Number	Pos.	Height	Weight	Year	Hometown	Notes
Xavier Gibson	1	F/C	6'11"	248	Senior	Dothan, Alabama	Graduated
Luke Loucks	3	G	6'5"	201	Senior	Clearwater, Florida	Graduated
Deividas Dulkys	4	G	6'5"	196	Senior	Šilutė, Lithuania	Graduated
Bernard James	5	F	6'10"	240	Senior	Savannah, Georgia	Graduated, NBA draft
Jeff Peterson	12	G	6'1"	195	Senior	Springfield, Missouri	Graduated
Antwan Space	24	F	6'8"	218	Freshman	Desoto, Texas	Transferred
Jon Kreft	50	F/C	7'0"	260	Senior	Coral Springs, Florida	Graduated

=== 2012 recruiting class ===
College recruiting information
Name	Hometown	School	Height	Weight	Commit date
Montay Brandon; SG	High Point, North Carolina	Wesleyan Christian Academy	6 ft 4 in (1.93 m)	180 lb (82 kg)	Sep 2, 2011
Montay Brandon; SG	Recruit ratings: Scout: Rivals: ESPN: (94)				
Aaron Thomas; SG	Cincinnati	Brewster Academy	6 ft 4 in (1.93 m)	195 lb (88 kg)	Nov 3, 2010
Aaron Thomas; SG	Recruit ratings: Scout: Rivals: ESPN: (N/A)				
Devon Bookert; PG	Anchorage, AK	West Anchorage High School	6 ft 2 in (1.88 m)	180 lb (82 kg)	Aug 19, 2011
Devon Bookert; PG	Recruit ratings: Scout: Rivals: ESPN: (N/A)				
Boris Bojanovsky; C	Bratislava, Slovakia	Canarias Basketball Academy	7 ft 3 in (2.21 m)	210 lb (95 kg)	Apr 24, 2012
Boris Bojanovsky; C	Recruit ratings: Scout: Rivals: ESPN: (89)				
Robert Gilchrist; PF	London, England	Polk State College	6 ft 9 in (2.06 m)	215 lb (98 kg)	Sep 21, 2011
Robert Gilchrist; PF	Recruit ratings: Scout: Rivals: ESPN: (JC)				
Michael Ojo; C	Lagos, Nigeria	Tennessee Temple Academy	7 ft 1 in (2.16 m)	290 lb (130 kg)	May 17, 2012
Michael Ojo; C	Recruit ratings: Scout: Rivals: ESPN: (N/A)				
Overall recruit ranking: Scout: 11 Rivals: 11 ESPN: 14
Note: In many cases, Scout, Rivals, 247Sports, On3, and ESPN may conflict in their listings of height and weight.; In these cases, the average was taken. ESPN grades are on a 100-point scale.; Sources: "2012 Team Ranking". Rivals.

== Awards ==
=== Watchlists ===
- Naismith Award

Michael Snaer

=== Honors ===
Michael Snaer has been honored with ACC Player of the Week recognition.

== Roster ==
2012–13 Florida State Seminoles men's basketball team
Players
Coaches

Pos.	#	Name	Height	Weight	Year	Previous school	Hometown
G	1	Devon Bookert	6 ft 3 in (1.91 m)	180 lb (82 kg)	Fr	West Anchorage HS	Anchorage, AK
F	2	Terrence Shannon	6 ft 8 in (2.03 m)	240 lb (109 kg)	RS Jr	Mary Persons HS	Forsyth, Georgia
G	5	Montay Brandon	6 ft 7 in (2.01 m)	216 lb (98 kg)	Fr	Wesleyan Christian Acad.	High Point, North Carolina
F	10	Okaro White	6 ft 8 in (2.03 m)	204 lb (93 kg)	Jr	Clearwater HS	Clearwater, Florida
C	11	Kiel Turpin	6 ft 11 in (2.11 m)	225 lb (102 kg)	RS Jr	Lincoln College	Normal, Illinois
F	14	Robert Gilchrist	6 ft 9 in (2.06 m)	220 lb (100 kg)	Jr	Polk State College	London, England
C	15	Boris Bojanovsky	7 ft 3 in (2.21 m)	240 lb (109 kg)	Fr	Oakley College	Bratislava, Slovakia
G	20	Rafael Portuondo	5 ft 11 in (1.8 m)	165 lb (75 kg)	Sr	Miami Dade College	Miami
G	21	Michael Snaer	6 ft 5 in (1.96 m)	202 lb (92 kg)	Sr	Rancho Verde HS	Moreno Valley, California
G	25	Aaron Thomas	6 ft 5 in (1.96 m)	195 lb (88 kg)	Fr	Brewster Academy	Cincinnati
G	30	Ian Miller	6 ft 3 in (1.91 m)	186 lb (84 kg)	Jr	United Faith Christian Academy	Charlotte, North Carolina
G	31	Terry Whisnant II	6 ft 3 in (1.91 m)	185 lb (84 kg)	So	Cherryville HS	Cherryville, North Carolina
G	33	Joey Moreau	6 ft 2 in (1.88 m)	179 lb (81 kg)	Sr	IMG Acad.	Bradenton, Florida
F	35	Joell Hopkins	6 ft 6 in (1.98 m)	205 lb (93 kg)	So	Tallahassee CC	Durham, North Carolina
C	50	Michael Ojo	7 ft 1 in (2.16 m)	290 lb (132 kg)	Fr	Tennessee Temple Acad.	Lagos, Nigeria

Head coach

- Leonard Hamilton (UT Martin)

Assistant coach(es)

- Stan Jones (Memphis)
- Corey Williams (Oklahoma State)
- Dennis Gates (California)

Legend

- (C) Team captain
- (S) Suspended
- (I) Ineligible
- (W) Walk-on
- Injured
- Current redshirt

Roster
Last update: 2012-08-30

=== Depth chart ===
Pos.	Starting 5	Bench 1	Bench 2
C	Kiel Turpin	Terrance Shannon
PF	Okaro White	Boris Bojanovsky
SF	Montay Brandon	Devon Bookert
SG	Michael Snaer	Robert Gilchrist
PG	Terry Whisnant	Michael Ojo	Aaron Thomas

== Team statistics ==
Indicates team leader in specific category

Name	PTS	PPG	FG %	3P %	FT %	AST	REB	BLK	STL
Michael Snaer	489	14.8	.425	.384	.817	82	147	15	33
Okaro White	420	12.4	.511	.313	.815	27	201	38	33
Terrance Shannon	157	7.9	.462	.000	.649	16	112	12	23
Devon Bookert	220	6.5	.489	.525	.818	80	62	5	19
Aaron Thomas	204	6.0	.408	.220	.700	38	80	10	22
Kiel Turpin	184	5.4	.511	.000	.698	10	101	43	14
Ian Miller	149	5.3	.327	.277	.634	52	46	0	23
Terry Whisnant	156	5.2	.406	.356	.952	18	29	3	16
Montay Brandon	129	3.9	.422	.290	.489	47	59	8	11
Boris Borjanovsky	95	2.9	.547	.000	.758	9	63	25	8
Robert Gilchrist	47	1.9	.429	.125	.308	2	29	6	4
Joey Moreau	8	1.3	.400	.667	1.000	0	0	0	0
Michael Ojo	18	0.7	.292	.000	.364	3	27	7	3
Rafael Portuondo	2	0.3	1.000	.000	.000	1	0	0	1
TEAM	2278	67.0	.444	.348	.735	385	1052	172	210
OPPONENTS	2231	68.6	.437	.368	.692	443	1142	103	244

Retrieved from Seminoles.com

== Rankings ==
Entering the 2012–2013 season, Florida State was ranked in both the AP and Coaches' Preseason Polls. The Seminoles were ranked No. 25 in the AP Poll and No. 24 in the Coaches' Poll.

Ranking movement Legend: ██ Increase in ranking. ██ Decrease in ranking. NR = Not ranked. RV = Received votes.
Poll	Preseason	Wk 1 Nov. 12	Wk 2 Nov. 19	Wk 3 Nov. 26	Wk 4 Dec. 3	Wk 5 Dec. 10	Wk 6 Dec. 17	Wk 7 Dec. 24	Wk 8 Dec. 31	Wk 9 Jan. 7	Wk 10 Jan. 14	Wk 11 Jan. 21	Wk 12 Jan. 28	Wk 13 Feb. 4	Wk 14 Feb. 11	Wk 15 Feb. 18	Wk 16 Feb. 25	Wk 17 Mar. 4	Wk 18 Mar. 11	Wk 19 Mar. 18	Final
AP	25	RV	RV	RV	NR	NR	NR	NR	NR	NR	NR	NR	NR	NR	NR	NR	NR	NR	NR	RV	NR
Coaches	24 т	RV	RV	RV	NR	NR	NR	NR	NR	NR	NR	NR	NR	NR	NR	NR	NR	NR	NR	NR	NR

- Source: ESPN.com: 2012 NCAA Basketball Rankings

== Schedule ==
Seminole Madness was held on October 12 at the Leon County Civic Center.

Date time, TV	Rank^{#}	Opponent^{#}	Result	Record	High points	High rebounds	High assists	Site (attendance) city, state
Exhibition
October 30*; 7:00 p.m.		Lincoln Memorial	W 83–75	0–0	– – –	– – –	– – –	Donald L. Tucker Center; Tallahassee, FL
November 5*; 7:00 p.m.		St. Leo	W 65–56	0–0	– – –	– – –	– – –	Donald L. Tucker Center; Tallahassee, FL
Non-conference regular season
November 9*; 7:00 p.m., ESPN3	No. 25	South Alabama; Coaches Vs. Cancer Classic	L 71–76	0–1	11 – Whisnant	7 – Snaer	4 – Miller	Donald L. Tucker Center (9,070); Tallahassee, FL
November 12*; 7:00 p.m., ESPN3		Buffalo; Coaches Vs. Cancer Classic	W 95–68	1–1	19 – Snaer	4 – Brandon	4 – Snaer, Miller	Donald L. Tucker Center (6,510); Tallahassee, FL
November 16*; 7:00 p.m., truTV		vs. BYU; Coaches Vs. Cancer Classic semifinals	W 88–70	2–1	17 – White	10 – Snaer	5 – Bookert	Barclays Center (6,433); Brooklyn, NY
November 17*; 9:30 p.m., truTV		vs. St. Joseph's; Coaches Vs. Cancer Classic finals	W 73–66	3–1	16 – White	10 – Shannon	6 – Miller	Barclays Center (5,502); Brooklyn, NY
November 21*; 7:00 p.m., FSSO/ESPN3		North Florida	W 75–67	4–1	21 – Snaer	9 – White	4 – Bookert	Donald L. Tucker Center (6,685); Tallahassee, FL
November 27*; 7:15 p.m., ESPN2		No. 21 Minnesota; ACC-Big Ten Challenge	L 68–77	4–2	14 – Shannon	11 – Shannon	5 – Brandon	Donald L. Tucker Center (7,941); Tallahassee, FL
December 2*; 2:00 p.m., ESPN3		Mercer	L 56–61	4–3	14 – White	6 – White	5 – Brandon	Donald L. Tucker Center (6,088); Tallahassee, FL
December 5*; 7:00 p.m., ESPNU		No. 6 Florida; Rivalry	L 47–72	4–4	10 – Snaer	6 – White	4 – Snaer	Donald L. Tucker Center (10,593); Tallahassee, FL
December 9*; 4:00 p.m., ESPNU		Maine	W 91–59	5–4	19 – Snaer	7 – White	5 – Bookert	Donald L. Tucker Center (5,725); Tallahassee, FL
December 17*; 7:00 p.m., ESPN3		Louisiana–Monroe	W 63–48	6–4	19 – White	11 – White	4 – Bookert	Donald L. Tucker Center (5,484); Tallahassee, FL
December 22*; 2:00 p.m., CBSSN		at Charlotte	W 79–76	7–4	30 – Snaer	5 – Tied	3 – Thomas	Time Warner Cable Arena (7,249); Charlotte, NC
December 29*; 2:00 p.m., Sun Sports/FSN		vs. Tulsa; Orange Bowl Basketball Classic	W 82–63	8–4	19 – Snaer	10 – Shannon	4 – Snaer	BB&T Center (12,779); Sunrise, FL
January 2*; 7:00 p.m., FSN/ESPN3		at Auburn	L 72–78	8–5	18 – Snaer	12 – Snaer	6 – Bookert	Auburn Arena (6,496); Auburn, AL
ACC regular season
January 5; 4:00 p.m., FSSO/ESPN3		at Clemson	W 71–66	9–5 (1–0)	15 – White	8 – Shannon	4 – Thomas	Littlejohn Coliseum (7,635); Clemson, SC
January 9; 8:00 p.m., ESPN3/ESPNFC		at Maryland	W 65–62	10–5 (2–0)	20 – White	9 – White	3 – Snaer	Comcast Center (14,157); College Park, MD
January 12; 2:00 p.m., ESPN		North Carolina	L 72–77	10–6 (2–1)	15 – White	6 – White	4 – Snaer, Brandon	Donald L. Tucker Center (12,060); Tallahassee, FL
January 19; 4:00 p.m., ACCN/ESPN3		at Virginia	L 36–56	10–7 (2–2)	9 – Snaer	5 – White	2 – Snaer	John Paul Jones Arena (12,303); Charlottesville, VA
January 24; 8:00 p.m., ACCN/ESPN3		Clemson	W 60–57	11–7 (3–2)	16 – Turpin	4 – Turpin	4 – Snaer	Donald L. Tucker Center (7,893); Tallahassee, FL
January 27; 6:00 p.m., ESPNU		at No. 25 Miami (FL)	L 47–71	11–8 (3–3)	12 – Miller	5 – Gilchrist	2 – Brandon, Miller	BankAtlantic Center (7,972); Coral Gables, FL
January 30; 8:00 p.m., ACCN/ESPN3		Maryland	W 73–71	12–8 (4–3)	19 – Snaer	4 – Snaer	3 – Snaer, White	Donald L. Tucker Center (7,222); Tallahassee, FL
February 2; 2:00 p.m., ESPN		No. 5 Duke	L 60–79	12–9 (4–4)	14 – Thomas	5 – Snaer	4 – Miller	Donald L. Tucker Center (12,100); Tallahassee, Florida
February 5; 9:00 p.m., FSSO/ESPN3		at Georgia Tech	W 56–54	13–9 (5–4)	15 – Snaer	10 – White	5 – Brandon	McCamish Pavilion (7,012); Atlanta, Ga
February 9; 12:00 p.m., ESPN2		at Wake Forest	L 46–71	13–10 (5–5)	13 – White, Snaer	6 – White, Turpin	2 – Snaer, Brandon, Bookert	LJVM Coliseum (10,259); Winston-Salem, NC
February 13; 7:00 p.m., ESPN2		No. 3 Miami (FL)	L 68–74	13–11 (5–6)	15 – White	7 – White	4 – Snaer	Donald L. Tucker Center (9,007); Tallahassee, FL
February 16; 12:00 p.m., ACCN/ESPN3		Boston College	W 69–66	14–11 (6–6)	21 – Snaer	8 – White	8 – Bookert	Donald L. Tucker Center (6,557); Tallahassee, FL
February 19; 7:00 p.m., ESPN2		at NC State	L 66–84	14–12 (6–7)	20 – Snaer	5 – Thomas	3 – Bookert	PNC Arena (17,011); Raleigh, NC
February 24; 6:00 p.m., ESPNU		at Virginia Tech	L 70–80	14–13 (6–8)	18 – White	10 – White	3 – Snaer, Bookert	Cassell Coliseum (5,042); Blacksburg, VA
February 26; 9:00 p.m., ESPNU		Wake Forest	W 76–62	15–13 (7–8)	24 – Snaer	9 – White	4 – Miller	Donald L. Tucker Center (6,589); Tallahassee, FL
March 3; 2:00 p.m., CBS		at North Carolina	L 58–79	15–14 (7–9)	17 – Snaer	8 – Bookert	4 – Bookert	Dean Smith Center (21,228); Chapel Hill, NC
March 7; 7:00 p.m., ESPN2		Virginia	W 53–51	16–14 (8–9)	17 – White	6 – White	3 – Bookert	Donald L. Tucker Center (6,430); Tallahassee, FL
March 9; 2:00 p.m., ESPN2		NC State	W 71–67	17–14 (9–9)	18 – Bookert	9 – White	3 – Bookert	Donald L. Tucker Center (6,730); Tallahassee, Florida
ACC tournament
March 14; 9:30 p.m., ESPNU/ACCN	(6)	vs. (11) Clemson; First round	W 73–69	18–14	24 – White	5 – Snaer, Bookert	5 – Snaer	Greensboro Coliseum (22,169); Greensboro, NC
March 15; 9:45 p.m., ESPN2/ACCN	(6)	vs. (3) North Carolina; Quarterfinals	L 62–83	18–15	20 – Snaer	7 – Snaer	5 – Snaer	Greensboro Coliseum (22,169); Greensboro, NC
National Invitation tournament
March 19*; 7:15 p.m., ESPN3	(4)	(5) Louisiana Tech; First round - Southern Miss Quadrant	L 66–71	18–16	24 – Snaer	6 – White, Shannon	4 – Shannon	Donald L. Tucker Center (2,989); Tallahassee, FL
*Non-conference game. ^{#}Rankings from AP poll. (#) Tournament seedings in parentheses. All times are in Eastern Time..

== Media ==
Florida State basketball is broadcast on the Florida State University Seminoles Radio Network.
