= Jeff Price =

American basketball player and coach

Current position
- Title: Head coach
- Team: Lynn

Biographical details
- Born: November 14, 1959 (age 66); Columbus, Ohio, U.S.

Playing career
- 1977–1979: St. Petersburg JC
- 1979–1981: Pikeville

Coaching career (HC unless noted)
- 1982–1983: Georgia Southern (asst.)
- 1983–1985: Union (KY) (asst.)
- 1985–1986: Washington (asst.)
- 1986–1987: Georgia Southern (asst.)
- 1987–1989: Washington (asst.)
- 1989–1993: South Alabama (asst.)
- 1993–1999: Lynn
- 1999–2009: Georgia Southern
- 2010–2011: West Virginia Wesleyan
- 2011–2012: South Alabama (asso. HC)
- 2012–2013: South Alabama (interim HC)
- 2013–present: Lynn

Jeff Price (born November 14, 1959) is the current head coach at Lynn University. He had previously served as the interim head men's basketball coach at South Alabama and Price went to USA after a one-year stint as the head coach at West Virginia Wesleyan College. The Bobcats earned just their second-ever NCAA Tournament appearance in Price's first season.

Price was the head coach at Georgia Southern University previously. Price resigned after winning 165 games in 10 seasons. Under Price, the Eagles recorded three 20-win seasons and returned to post-season play after a 14-year absence in 2006 with a berth in the NIT. Price's first head coaching job came at Lynn University.

Price was appointed the interim head coach of the South Alabama Jaguars on December 19, 2012, succeeding Ronnie Arrow, who abruptly retired.
