= Coaches vs. Cancer Classic =

US college basketball tournament

The Coaches vs. Cancer Classic was an annual college basketball tournament event benefiting cancer research held from 2012 to 2014. The event was held at the Barclays Center in Brooklyn, New York, and televised by truTV. The tournament replaced the previous Coaches vs. Cancer Classic tournament of 1995–2011, which was renamed the 2K Sports Classic in 2012 when it became a charitable event for the Wounded Warrior Project.

The tournament featured 12 schools, with four host schools playing two games on campus and advancing to the championship rounds held at the Barclays Center. The remainder of the field participated in a round-robin series at one of the two sub-host sites.

The Florida State Seminoles won the inaugural Coaches vs. Cancer Classic in 2012 by defeating the St. Joseph's Hawks 73–66. The tournament was held again in 2013 and 2014, but then was quietly discontinued.

== Most appearances ==
School	Appearances
BYU	1
Duke	1
Florida State	1
Michigan State	1
Notre Dame	1
Oklahoma	1
Saint Joseph's	1
Seton Hall	1
Stanford	1
Temple	1
UNLV	1
Virginia Tech	1

== All-time Championship games ==
- 2012 - Florida State 73, St. Joseph's 66
- 2013 - Michigan State 87, Oklahoma 76
- 2014 - Duke 70, Stanford 59

== 2012 participants and bracket ==
- BYU
- Florida State (champions)
- Notre Dame
- Saint Joseph's
- Tennessee State
- Georgia State (sub-host site)
- South Alabama
- Evansville (sub-host site)
- Yale
- Buffalo
- Western Illinois
- Monmouth

=== Championship bracket ===
Semifinals; November 16 truTV
BYU	70
Florida State	88
20	Notre Dame	70
Saint Joseph's	79^{OT}

Championship; November 17 truTV
Florida State	73
Saint Joseph's	66
Consolation; November 17 truTV
BYU	68
Notre Dame	78

== 2013 participants and bracket ==
- Columbia
- Idaho
- Kent State (sub-host site)
- Michigan State
- Niagara
- North Texas
- Oklahoma
- Portland (sub-host site)
- Seton Hall
- USC Upstate
- Virginia Tech
- Western Carolina

=== Championship bracket ===
Semifinals; November 22 truTV
Oklahoma	86
Seton Hall	85
1	Michigan State	96
Virginia Tech	77

Championship; November 23 truTV
Oklahoma	76
1	Michigan State	87
Consolation; November 23 truTV
Seton Hall	68
Virginia Tech	67

== 2014 participants and bracket ==
- American
- Duke
- Fairfield (sub-host site)
- Louisiana Tech (sub-host site)
- Morehead State
- Presbyterian
- Sam Houston State
- South Dakota
- Temple
- UNLV
- Wofford

=== Championship Bracket ===
Semifinals; November 21 truTV
Stanford	89
UNLV	60
4	Duke	74
Temple	54

Championship; November 22 truTV
Stanford	59
4	Duke	70
Consolation; November 22 truTV
UNLV	57
Temple	50
