= Bank OZK Arena =

Multipurpose arena in Hot Springs, Arkansas

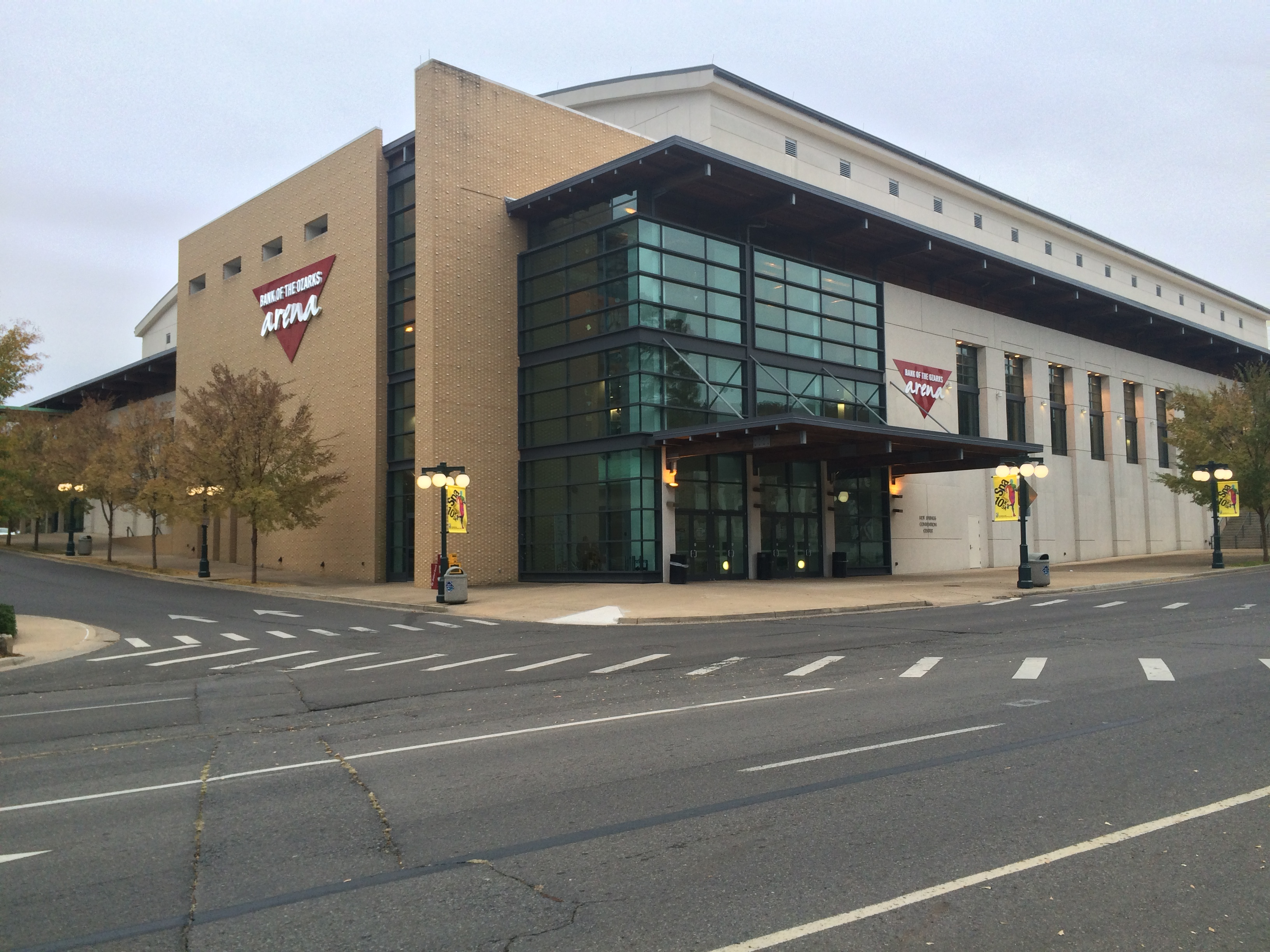
- Interactive map of Bank OZK Arena
- Former names: Summit Arena (2003-2014); Bank of the Ozarks Arena (2014-2018)
- Address: 398 Convention Boulevard
- Location: Hot Springs, Arkansas, U.S.
- Coordinates: 34°30′35″N 93°02′57″W
- Owner: Hot Springs Convention Center
- Operator: Visit Hot Springs
- Capacity: 6,300; 6,050 (sporting events); 4,141 (indoor football)
- Surface: 210' x 85' (indoor football)

Construction
- Groundbreaking: 19 December 2001
- Opened: 6 December 2003
- Cost: $39.8 million ($53.4 million in 2025 dollars)

Tenant
- Arkansas Diamonds (TAL) (2025-2026)

Website
- Venue Website

The Bank OZK Arena, formerly known as Summit Arena and Bank of the Ozarks Arena, is a 6,300-seat multi-purpose arena in Hot Springs, Arkansas, USA.

== History ==
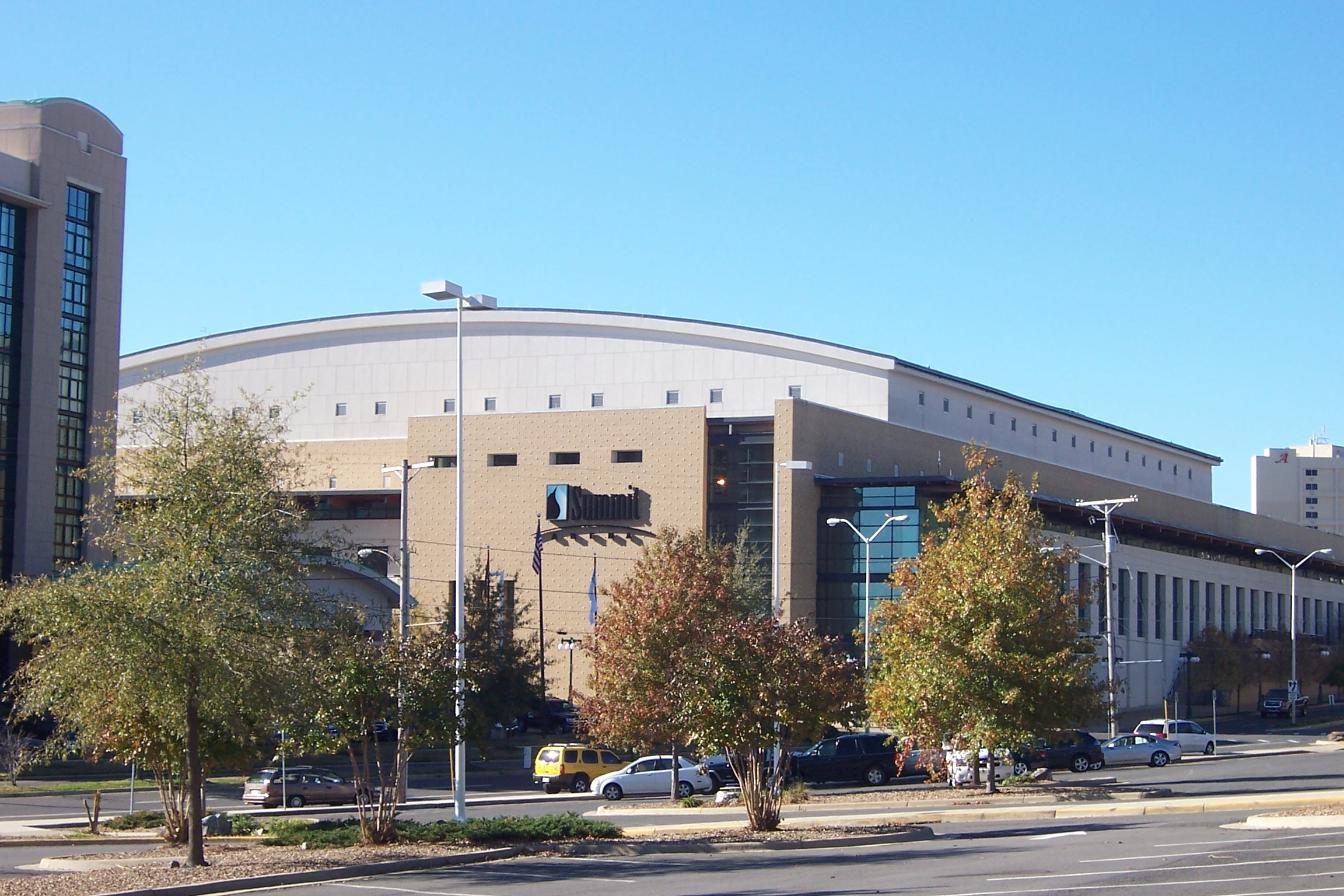
The Summit Arena signage in 2008, with the Hot Springs Convention Center extending out to the right and part of an adjoining Embassy Suites hotel on the left

Prior to the 2014 acquisition of Summit Bank of Arkadelphia, Arkansas by Bank of the Ozarks, Summit Bank was the arena's naming sponsor.

== Events ==
It hosts local sporting events, concerts, and assorted other engagements such as the Miss Arkansas Pageant. It was opened in 2003 with a concert by Tony Bennett. The arena can seat 6,050 for sporting events and circuses. It has hosted the Arkansas Activities Association's High School Basketball Championships since 2012 and the Great American Conference's Women's Volleyball Championship since 2013. It has been the site of the Forrest L. Wood national bass fishing championship five times (2007, 2011, 2015, 2018, 2019).

== Hot Springs Convention Center ==
The arena, with a 47-foot (14 m) ceiling height and 30,750 square feet (2,857 m^{2}) of exhibit space, is the newest facility in the Hot Springs Convention Center complex, which also includes a 72,000-square-foot (6,700 m^{2}) exhibit hall which is used for trade shows, conventions, and other events (maximum capacity: 8,000), has a 30-foot (9 m) ceiling height, and can be divisible into four smaller halls; and fifteen meeting rooms, including the 15,950-square-foot (1,482 m^{2}) Horner Hall ballroom with capacity of up to 1,850 and capable of hosting banquets, meetings and other special events, along with 13,735 square feet (1,276 m^{2}) of meeting space in the other 14 meeting rooms.

The complex is also home to a permanent art collection.

Preceded by St. Joseph Civic Arena; St. Joseph, Missouri	Host of the NCAA Division II women's basketball tournament 2005-2006	Succeeded by Health and Sports Center; Kearney, Nebraska
Preceded by Mitchell Center; Mobile, Alabama	Host of the Sun Belt Conference men's basketball tournament 2009-2013	Succeeded by Lakefront Arena; New Orleans, Louisiana
Preceded by Mitchell Center; Mobile, Alabama	Host of the Sun Belt Conference women's basketball tournament 2009-2013	Succeeded by Lakefront Arena; New Orleans, Louisiana
Preceded by none	Home of the Hot Springs Wiseguys; 2025	Succeeded by Current
