= 2013 NCAA Men's Basketball All-Americans =

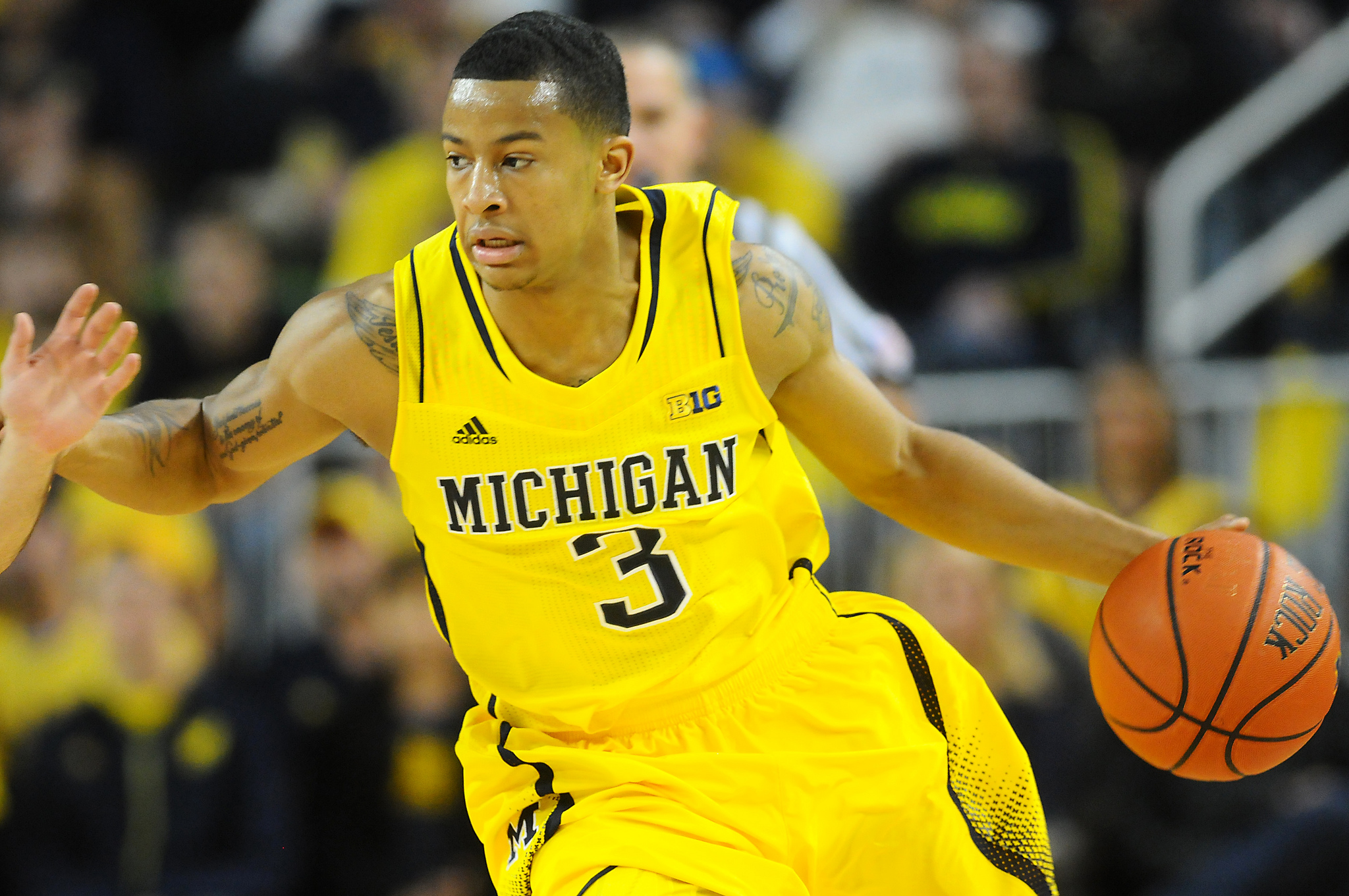
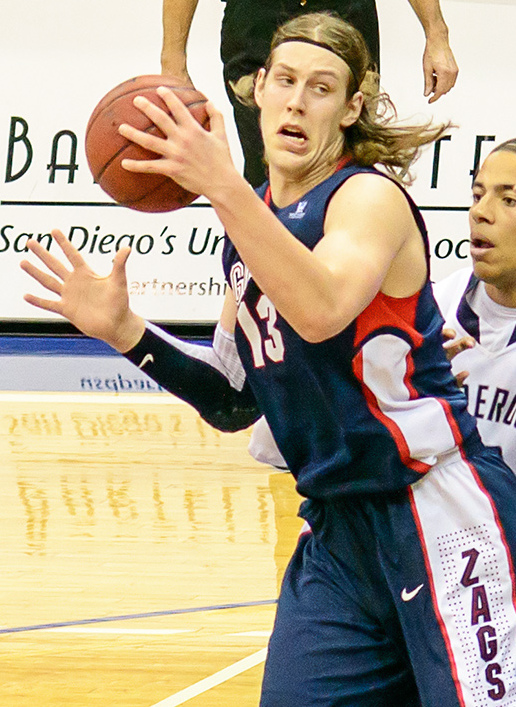
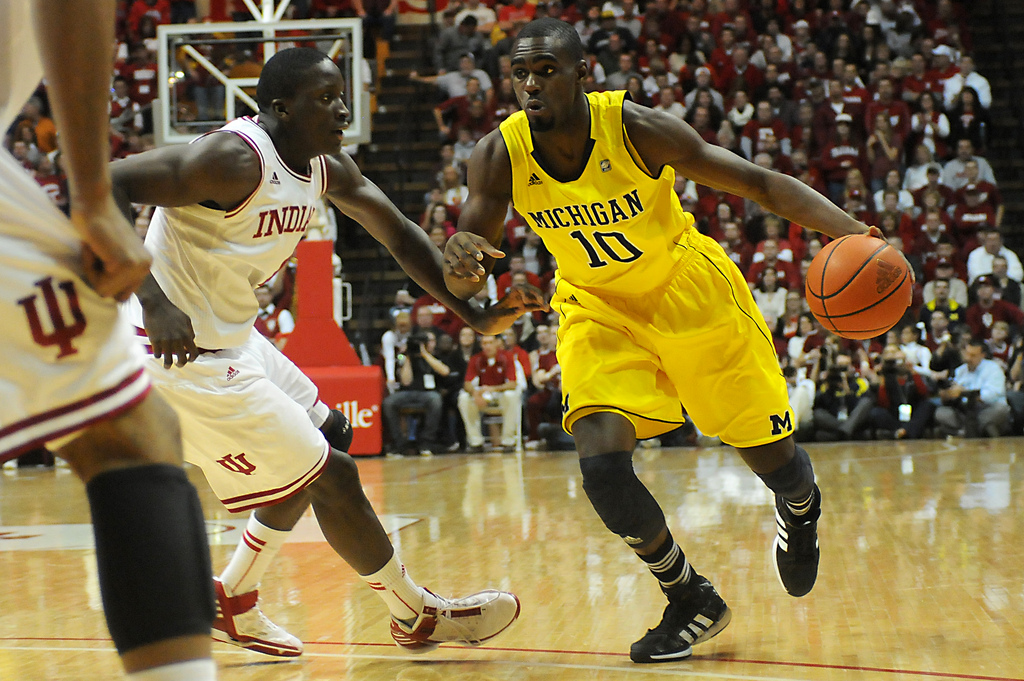
- The 2013 consensus first team. Clockwise from top left: Burke, Olynyk, and Oladipo (not pictured: McDermott, Porter).
- Awarded for: 2012–13 NCAA Division I men's basketball season

An All-American team is an honorary sports team composed of the best amateur players of a specific season for each team position—who in turn are given the honorific "All-America" and typically referred to as "All-American athletes", or simply "All-Americans". Although the honorees generally do not compete together as a unit, the term is used in U.S. team sports to refer to players who are selected by members of the national media. Walter Camp selected the first All-America team in the early days of American football in 1889. The 2013 NCAA Men's Basketball All-Americans are honorary lists that include All-American selections from the Associated Press (AP), the United States Basketball Writers Association (USBWA), the Sporting News (TSN), and the National Association of Basketball Coaches (NABC) for the 2012–13 NCAA Division I men's basketball season. All selectors choose at least a first and second 5-man team. The NABC, TSN and AP choose third teams, while AP also lists honorable mention selections.

The Consensus 2013 College Basketball All-American team is determined by aggregating the results of the four major All-American teams as determined by the National Collegiate Athletic Association (NCAA). Since United Press International was replaced by TSN in 1997, the four major selectors have been the aforementioned ones. AP has been a selector since 1948, NABC since 1957 and USBWA since 1960. To earn "consensus" status, a player must win honors based on a point system computed from the four different all-America teams. The point system consists of three points for first team, two points for the second team and one point for third team. No honorable mention or fourth team or lower are used in the computation. The top five totals plus ties are first team and the next five plus ties are second team.

Although the aforementioned lists are used to determine consensus honors, there are numerous other All-American lists. The ten finalists for the John Wooden Award are described as Wooden All-Americans. The ten finalists for the Senior CLASS Award are described as Senior All-Americans. Other All-American lists include those determined by Fox Sports, and Yahoo! Sports. The scholar-athletes selected by College Sports Information Directors of America (CoSIDA) are termed Academic All-Americans.

== 2013 Consensus All-America team ==
PG – Point guard
SG – Shooting guard
PF – Power forward
SF – Small forward
C – Center

Consensus First Team
Player	Position	Class	Team
Trey Burke	PG	Sophomore	Michigan
Doug McDermott	SF	Junior	Creighton
Victor Oladipo	SG	Junior	Indiana
Kelly Olynyk	PF/C	Junior	Gonzaga
Otto Porter	F	Sophomore	Georgetown

Consensus Second Team
Player	Position	Class	Team
Ben McLemore	SG	Freshman	Kansas
Mason Plumlee	PF/C	Senior	Duke
Marcus Smart	PG	Freshman	Oklahoma State
Jeff Withey	C	Senior	Kansas
Cody Zeller	PF	Sophomore	Indiana

== Individual All-America teams ==
Player	School	AP	USBWA	NABC	TSN	CP	Notes
Trey Burke	Michigan	1	1	1	1	12	National Player of the Year (AP, NABC Player of the Year, Naismith College Player of the Year, Robertson, SI, Wooden) and Bob Cousy Award
Victor Oladipo	Indiana	1	1	1	1	12	National Player of the Year (TSN Rupp) and NABC Co-Defensive Player of the Year
Kelly Olynyk	Gonzaga	1	1	1	1	12	
Otto Porter	Georgetown	1	1	1	1	12	
Doug McDermott	Creighton	1	1	1	2	11	
Marcus Smart	Oklahoma State	2	2	2	1	9	Freshman of the Year (TSN, USBWA)
Ben McLemore	Kansas	2	2	2	3	7	
Cody Zeller	Indiana	2	2	2	3	7	
Mason Plumlee	Duke	2	2	2		6	Pete Newell Big Man Award
Jeff Withey	Kansas	3	2	3	2	6	NABC Co-Defensive Player of the Year
Shane Larkin	Miami (Florida)	2		2	3	5	Lute Olson Award
Deshaun Thomas	Ohio State	3		3	2	4	
Russ Smith	Louisville	3		3	3	3	
Allen Crabbe	California			3	3	2	
Seth Curry	Duke				2	2	
Shabazz Muhammad	UCLA				2	2	
Nate Wolters	South Dakota State	3		3		2	
Erick Green	Virginia Tech	3				1	NCAA scoring leader

=== By team ===
All-America Team
All-America Team	First team		Second team		Third team	
All-America Team	Player	School	Player	School	Player	School
Associated Press	Trey Burke	Michigan	Shane Larkin	Miami (Florida)	Erick Green	Virginia Tech
Associated Press	Doug McDermott	Creighton	Ben McLemore	Kansas	Russ Smith	Louisville
Associated Press	Victor Oladipo	Indiana	Mason Plumlee	Duke	Deshaun Thomas	Ohio State
Associated Press	Kelly Olynyk	Gonzaga	Marcus Smart	Oklahoma State	Jeff Withey	Kansas
Associated Press	Otto Porter	Georgetown	Cody Zeller	Indiana	Nate Wolters	South Dakota State
USBWA	Trey Burke	Michigan	Ben McLemore	Kansas	No third team	
USBWA	Doug McDermott	Creighton	Mason Plumlee	Duke	No third team	
USBWA	Victor Oladipo	Indiana	Marcus Smart	Oklahoma State	No third team	
USBWA	Kelly Olynyk	Gonzaga	Jeff Withey	Kansas	No third team	
USBWA	Otto Porter	Georgetown	Cody Zeller	Indiana	No third team	
NABC	Trey Burke	Michigan	Marcus Smart	Oklahoma State	Jeff Withey	Kansas
NABC	Victor Oladipo	Indiana	Ben McLemore	Kansas	Deshaun Thomas	Ohio State
NABC	Kelly Olynyk	Gonzaga	Cody Zeller	Indiana	Russ Smith	Louisville
NABC	Otto Porter	Georgetown	Mason Plumlee	Duke	Allen Crabbe	California
NABC	Doug McDermott	Creighton	Shane Larkin	Miami (Florida)	Nate Wolters	South Dakota State
Sporting News	Trey Burke	Michigan	Seth Curry	Duke	Allen Crabbe	California
Sporting News	Victor Oladipo	Indiana	Doug McDermott	Creighton	Shane Larkin	Miami (Florida)
Sporting News	Kelly Olynyk	Gonzaga	Shabazz Muhammad	UCLA	Ben McLemore	Kansas
Sporting News	Otto Porter	Georgetown	Deshaun Thomas	Ohio State	Russ Smith	Louisville
Sporting News	Marcus Smart	Oklahoma State	Jeff Withey	Kansas	Cody Zeller	Indiana

AP Honorable Mention:

- Kyle Barone, Idaho
- Jerrelle Benimon, Towson
- Anthony Bennett, UNLV
- Tommy Brenton, Stony Brook
- Sherwood Brown, Florida Gulf Coast
- Isaiah Canaan, Murray State
- Kentavious Caldwell-Pope, Georgia
- Michael Carter-Williams, Syracuse
- Ian Clark, Belmont
- Jake Cohen, Davidson
- Jack Cooley, Notre Dame
- D. J. Cooper, Ohio
- Allen Crabbe, California
- Aaron Craft, Ohio State
- Seth Curry, Duke
- Matthew Dellavedova, Saint Mary's
- Gorgui Dieng, Louisville
- James Ennis, Long Beach State
- Chris Flores, NJIT
- Jamaal Franklin, San Diego State
- Ian Hummer, Princeton
- Colton Iverson, Colorado State
- Joe Jackson, Memphis
- Kareem Jamar, Montana
- Lamont Jones, Iona
- Ray McCallum, Jr., Detroit
- Rodney McGruder, Kansas State
- Shabazz Muhammad, UCLA
- Erik Murphy, Florida
- Mike Muscala, Bucknell
- Stan Okoye, VMI
- Jamal Olasewere, Long Island
- Phil Pressey, Missouri
- Augustine Rubit, South Alabama
- Peyton Siva, Louisville
- Taylor Smith, Stephen F. Austin
- Omar Strong, Texas Southern
- Kendall Williams, New Mexico
- Pendarvis Williams, Norfolk State
- Khalif Wyatt, Temple

== Academic All-Americans ==
On February 21, 2013, CoSIDA and Capital One announced the 2013 Academic All-America team, with Aaron Craft headlining the University Division as the men's college basketball Academic All-American of the Year. The following is the 2012–13 Capital One Academic All-America Men's Basketball Team (University Division) as selected by CoSIDA:

First Team
Player	School	Class	GPA and major
Aaron Craft	Ohio State	Junior	3.92 Nutrition/Pre-Med
Mason Plumlee	Duke	Senior	3.36 Psychology
Matthew Sullivan	Brown	Senior	4.00 Economics
Kelly Olynyk	Gonzaga	Junior	3.53 Accounting
Cody Zeller	Indiana	Sophomore	3.44 Business

Second Team
Player	School	Class	GPA and major
Matthew Dellavedova	Saint Mary's	Senior	3.40 Psychology
Ben Averkamp	Loyola	Senior	3.80 Biology
Nathan Healy	Appalachian State	Senior	3.99 Management
Peyton Siva	Louisville	Senior	3.37 Sociology
Andrew Smith	Butler	Senior	3.54 Finance

Third Team
Player	School	Class	GPA and major
Jordan Hulls	Indiana	Graduate Student	3.49 Athletic Administration
Mike Muscala	Bucknell	Senior	3.36 Management
Marc Trasolini	Santa Clara	Graduate Student	3.60 Finance
Mathias Ward	Montana	Graduate Student	3.69 Business (M.B.A.)
Darren White	Campbell	Senior	3.66 Information Security & Tech.

== Senior All-Americans ==
The ten finalists for the Senior CLASS Award are called Senior All-Americans. The 10 honorees are as follows: Jordan Hulls won the Senior CLASS Award.

Player	School
Matthew Dellavedova	Saint Mary's
Mike Groselle	The Citadel
Jordan Hulls	Indiana
Jonathan Lee	Northeastern
CJ McCollum	Lehigh
Mike Muscala	Bucknell
Mason Plumlee	Duke
Peyton Siva	Louisville
Andrew Smith	Butler
Marc Trasolini	Santa Clara
