= 2012–13 Furman Paladins men's basketball team =

American college basketball season

2012–13 Furman Paladins men's basketball
- Conference: Southern Conference
- South Division
- Record: 7–24 (3–15 SoCon)
- Head coach: Jeff Jackson (7th season)
- Assistant coaches: David Wilson; Bob Richey; Shammond Williams
- Home arena: Timmons Arena

2012–13 Southern Conference men's basketball standings
	Conf.				Overall
Team	W		L	PCT	W		L	PCT
North
Elon	13	–	5	.722	21	–	12	.636
Appalachian State	10	–	8	.556	15	–	16	.484
Western Carolina	9	–	9	.500	14	–	19	.424
Samford	9	–	9	.500	11	–	21	.344
Chattanooga	8	–	10	.444	13	–	19	.406
UNC Greensboro	6	–	12	.333	9	–	22	.290
South
Davidson †	17	–	1	.944	26	–	8	.765
College of Charleston	14	–	4	.778	24	–	11	.686
Georgia Southern	7	–	11	.389	14	–	19	.424
Wofford	7	–	11	.389	13	–	19	.406
The Citadel	5	–	13	.278	8	–	22	.267
Furman	3	–	15	.167	7	–	24	.226
† SoCon Tournament winner As of March 20, 2013; Rankings from AP Poll

The 2012–13 Furman Paladins men's basketball team represented Furman University during the 2012–13 NCAA Division I men's basketball season. The Paladins, led by seventh-year head coach Jeff Jackson, played their home games at Timmons Arena and were members of the South Division of the Southern Conference ("SoCon"). They finished the season 7–24, 3–15 in SoCon play to finish in last place in the South Division. They lost in the quarterfinals of the SoCon tournament to Appalachian State.

== Roster ==
Number	Name	Position	Height	Weight	Year	Hometown
0	Tyler Bisack	Guard	6–3	185	Sophomore	Fairfield, Connecticut
1	JR Walker	Guard	5–9	163	Freshman	Los Angeles
4	Tyler Hunt	Forward	6–7	232	Sophomore	Oswego, New York
5	Aaron O'Neill	Guard	6–0	190	Sophomore	Cincinnati, Ohio
10	Jordan Loyd	Guard	6–3	190	Sophomore	Atlanta
11	David Brown	Guard	5–10	170	Sophomore	Mauldin, South Carolina
12	Charlie Reddick	Guard/Forward	6–5	185	Junior	Powder Springs, Georgia
14	Stephen Croone	Guard	6–0	170	Freshman	Covington, Georgia
15	Bryant Irvin	Forward	6–7	220	Senior	Bridgeport, West Virginia
22	Bobby Austin	Guard	6–3	200	Senior	Cincinnati, Ohio
24	Larry Wideman	Guard	6–4	190	Freshman	Loris, South Carolina
30	Kendrec Ferrara	Forward	6–9	255	Freshman	Cape Coral, Florida
32	Keith Belfield	Guard/Forward	6–6	205	Freshman	Charlotte, North Carolina
35	Dominic Early	Guard/Forward	6–5	185	Sophomore	Atlanta
41	Vinny Zollo	Forward	6–9	240	Sophomore	Winchester, Kentucky
42	Kevin Chuisseu	Forward	6–8	230	Freshman	Douala, Cameroon
43	Colin Reddick	Forward	6–9	240	Senior	Powder Springs, Georgia

== Schedule ==
Date time, TV	Opponent	Result	Record	Site (attendance) city, state
Exhibition
11/03/2012*; 1:00 pm	Limestone	W 77—68		Timmons Arena (452); Greenville, South Carolina
Regular season
11/10/2012*; 7:00 pm	Columbia	L 47–68	0–1	Timmons Arena (702); Greenville, South Carolina
11/13/2012*; 8:00 am	Southern Wesleyan	W 90–71	1–1	Timmons Arena (768); Greenville, South Carolina
11/16/2012*; 7:00 pm, ESPN3	Clemson	L 55–72	1–2	Timmons Arena (2,746); Greenville, South Carolina
11/19/2012*; 7:00 pm	Brevard	W 76–53	2–2	Timmons Arena (501); Greenville, South Carolina
11/25/2012*; 7:00 pm	at Mercer	L 46–73	2–3	Hawkins Arena (2,272); Macon, Georgia
11/28/2012; 7:00 pm	Western Carolina	L 65–79	2–4 (0–1)	Timmons Arena (957); Greenville, South Carolina
12/01/2012*; 3:00 pm	at Loyola–Chicago	L 50–77	2–5	Joseph J. Gentile Arena (2,147); Chicago
12/09/2012*; 3:00 pm	Presbyterian	W 81–57	3–5	Timmons Arena (909); Greenville, South Carolina
12/15/2012*; 8:00 pm	at Auburn	L 50–64	3–6	Auburn Arena (4,820); Auburn, Alabama
12/18/2012*; 7:00 pm, FS South/ESPN3	at Wake Forest	L 55–79	3–7	LJVM Coliseum (6,782); Winston-Salem, North Carolina
12/22/2012*; 3:00 pm	at Jacksonville	L 53–65	3–8	Jacksonville Veterans Memorial Arena (896); Jacksonville, Florida
12/30/2012*; 5:00 pm	at SMU	L 53–72	3–9	Moody Coliseum (2,858); University Park, Texas
01/05/2013; 5:00 pm, ESPN3	at College of Charleston	L 56–60	3–10 (0–2)	TD Arena (3,885); Charleston, South Carolina
01/12/2013; 4:30 pm	Davidson	L 73–81	3–11 (0–3)	Timmons Arena (2,459); Greenville, South Carolina
01/14/2013; 7:00 pm	Wofford	W 69–65	4–11 (1–3)	Timmons Arena (1,405); Greenville, South Carolina
01/17/2013; 7:00 pm	at Elon	L 59–73	4–12 (1–4)	Alumni Gym (1,227); Elon, North Carolina
01/20/2013; 2:00 pm	at UNC Greensboro	W 69–61	5–12 (2–4)	Greensboro Coliseum (3,222); Greensboro, North Carolina
01/24/2013; 7:00 pm, ESPN3	at Wofford	L 50–63	5–13 (2–5)	Benjamin Johnson Arena (1,537); Spartanburg, South Carolina
01/31/2013; 7:00 pm	Georgia Southern	W 81–74	6–13 (3–5)	Timmons Arena (1,120); Greenville, South Carolina
02/02/2013; 4:00 pm, CSS	The Citadel	L 79–84	6–14 (3–6)	Timmons Arena (2,122); Greenville, South Carolina
02/07/2013; 7:00 pm	UNC Greensboro	L 65–88	6–15 (3–7)	Timmons Arena (1,102); Greenville, South Carolina
02/09/2013; 4:00 pm	Elon	L 60–64	6–16 (3–8)	Timmons Arena (1,131); Greenville, South Carolina
02/11/2013; 8:00 pm	at Appalachian State	L 66–72	6–17 (3–9)	George M. Holmes Convocation Center (818); Boone, North Carolina
02/14/2013; 7:00 pm	at Chattanooga	L 49–83	6–18 (3–10)	McKenzie Arena (2,663); Chattanooga, Tennessee
02/16/2013; 4:00 pm	Samford	L 53–64	6–19 (3–11)	Timmons Arena (903); Greenville, South Carolina
02/20/2013; 7:00 pm	at Davidson	L 36–73	6–20 (3–12)	John M. Belk Arena (3,433); Davidson, North Carolina
02/23/2013; 7:00 pm	at Georgia Southern	L 61–78	6–21 (3–13)	Hanner Fieldhouse (1,379); Statesboro, Georgia
02/28/2013; 7:05 pm	at The Citadel	L 57–68	6–22 (3–14)	McAlister Field House (2,046); Charleston, South Carolina
03/02/2013; 4:00 pm	College of Charleston	L 50–74	6–23 (3–15)	Timmons Arena (1,143); Greenville, South Carolina
2013 Southern Conference men's basketball tournament
03/08/2013; 2:00 pm, ESPN3	vs. Samford; First Round	W 55–51	7–23	U.S. Cellular Center (2,920); Asheville, North Carolina
03/09/2013; 2:30 pm, ESPN3	vs. Appalachian State; Quarterfinals	L 60–74	7–24	U.S. Cellular Center (5,313); Asheville, North Carolina
*Non-conference game. ^{#}Rankings from AP Poll. (#) Tournament seedings in parentheses. All times are in Eastern Time.
