= 2012–13 UNC Greensboro Spartans men's basketball team =

American college basketball season

2012–13 UNC Greensboro Spartans men's basketball
- Conference: Southern Conference
- North Division
- Record: 9–22 (6–12 SoCon)
- Head coach: Wes Miller (2nd season)
- Assistant coaches: Mike Roberts; Duane Simpkins; Jackie Manuel
- Home arena: Greensboro Coliseum

2012–13 Southern Conference men's basketball standings
	Conf.				Overall
Team	W		L	PCT	W		L	PCT
North
Elon	13	–	5	.722	21	–	12	.636
Appalachian State	10	–	8	.556	15	–	16	.484
Western Carolina	9	–	9	.500	14	–	19	.424
Samford	9	–	9	.500	11	–	21	.344
Chattanooga	8	–	10	.444	13	–	19	.406
UNC Greensboro	6	–	12	.333	9	–	22	.290
South
Davidson †	17	–	1	.944	26	–	8	.765
College of Charleston	14	–	4	.778	24	–	11	.686
Georgia Southern	7	–	11	.389	14	–	19	.424
Wofford	7	–	11	.389	13	–	19	.406
The Citadel	5	–	13	.278	8	–	22	.267
Furman	3	–	15	.167	7	–	24	.226
† SoCon Tournament winner As of March 20, 2013; Rankings from AP Poll

The 2012–13 UNC Greensboro Spartans men's basketball team represented University of North Carolina at Greensboro during the 2012–13 NCAA Division I men's basketball season. The Spartans, led by second-year head coach Wes Miller, played their home games at the Greensboro Coliseum and were members of the North Division of the Southern Conference.

They finished the season 9–22, 6–12 in SoCon play to finish in last place in the North Division. They lost in the quarterfinals of the SoCon tournament to Elon.

== Roster ==
Number	Name	Position	Height	Weight	Year	Hometown
0	David Williams	Forward	6–6	205	Junior	Jacksonville, Florida
1	Drew Parker	Guard	6–1	178	Junior	Houston, Texas
2	Thomas Sumpter	Guard	6–2	170	Sophomore	Durham, North Carolina
3	Derrell Armstrong	Guard	6–1	205	Senior	Mechanicsville, Maryland
4	Kendall Bethea	Guard	6–2	210	Junior	Lincolnton, North Carolina
11	Korey van Dussen	Guard	6–1	175	Senior	Zeeland, Michigan
13	Kayel Locke	Forward	6–5	240	Freshman	Owings Mills, Maryland
14	Kyle Cain	Forward	6–7	210	Junior	Chicago, Illinois
15	Trevis Simpson	Guard/forward	6–4	185	Junior	Douglas, Georgia
20	Jordan Potts	Guard	5–11	170	Freshman	Columbus, Ohio
24	Kelvin McNeil	Forward	6–8	230	Senior	Newport News, Virginia
25	Demetrius Robinson	Guard	6–3	195	Senior	Fuquay-Varina, North Carolina
31	Nicholas Paulos	Guard/forward	6–7	185	Sophomore	Salt Lake City
33	Tyler McNeely	Forward	6–4	220	Junior	Princeton, New Jersey
34	RJ White	Center	6–8	280	Freshman	Frisco, Texas
35	Jamal Mitchell	Guard/forward	6–4	190	Sophomore	Charlotte, North Carolina
50	Brian Cole	Forward/center	6–8	232	Senior	Dacula, Georgia
51	Taylor Hoffer	Forward	6–5	210	Junior	Poulsbo, Washington

== Schedule ==
Date time, TV	Opponent	Result	Record	Site (attendance) city, state
Exhibition
11/03/2012*; 6:00 pm	Bluefield State	W 102–74		Fleming Gymnasium (1,842); Greensboro, North Carolina
Regular season
11/09/2012*; 7:00 pm	at High Point	L 73–81	0–1	Millis Athletic Convocation Center (1,706); High Point, North Carolina
11/12/2012*; 7:00 pm	Winston-Salem State	W 81–65	1–1	Greensboro Coliseum (4,123); Greensboro, North Carolina
11/16/2012*; 7:00 pm	at East Carolina	L 73–76	1–2	Williams Arena at Minges Coliseum (4,946); Greenville, North Carolina
11/19/2012*; 7:00 pm, ESPN3	Virginia Tech	L 87–96	1–3	Greensboro Coliseum (3,082); Greensboro, North Carolina
11/25/2012*; 2:00 pm	Rutgers	L 80–87	1–4	Greensboro Coliseum (1,793); Greensboro, North Carolina
11/28/2012*; 7:00 pm	North Carolina A&T; Battle of Market Street	L 79–90	1–5	Greensboro Coliseum (3,130); Greensboro, North Carolina
12/01/2012; 7:00 pm	The Citadel	W 84–54	2–5 (1–0)	Greensboro Coliseum (2,035); Greensboro, North Carolina
12/16/2012*; 2:00 pm	at James Madison	L 73–85	2–6	JMU Convocation Center (2,683); Harrisonburg, Virginia
12/19/2012*; 7:00 pm	at UNC Wilmington	L 73–87	2–7	Trask Coliseum (3,497); Wilmington, North Carolina
12/22/2012*; 2:30 pm, ESPN3	Wake Forest	L 70–84	2–8	Greensboro Coliseum (3,482); Greensboro, North Carolina
12/31/2012*; 5:00 pm, ESPNU	at No. 23 NC State	L 68–89	2–9	PNC Arena (12,207); Raleigh, North Carolina
01/05/2013; 7:00 pm, ESPN3	at Davidson	L 53–85	2–10 (1–1)	John M. Belk Arena (3,843); Davidson, North Carolina
01/09/2013*; 7:00 pm	Lees–McRae	W 86–47	3–10	Greensboro Coliseum (1,847); Greensboro, North Carolina
01/12/2013; 2:00 pm	at Western Carolina	L 59–62	3–11 (1–2)	Ramsey Center (1,634); Cullowhee, North Carolina
01/14/2013; 7:00 pm	at Appalachian State	L 70–83	3–12 (1–3)	Holmes Center (1,327); Boone, North Carolina
01/16/2013; 7:00 pm	Wofford	W 71–52	4–12 (2–3)	Greensboro Coliseum (2,174); Greensboro, North Carolina
01/20/2013; 2:00 pm	Furman	L 61–69	4–13 (2–4)	Greensboro Coliseum (3,222); Greensboro, North Carolina
01/24/2013; 7:00 pm	Samford	W 66–64	5–13 (3–4)	Greensboro Coliseum (1,902); Greensboro, North Carolina
01/27/2013; 2:00 pm	Chattanooga	W 77–69	6–13 (4–4)	Greensboro Coliseum (1,310); Greensboro, North Carolina
01/31/2013; 7:00 pm	Elon	L 66–72	6–14 (4–5)	Greensboro Coliseum (2,898); Greensboro, North Carolina
02/02/2013; 7:00 pm, ESPN3	at College of Charleston	L 59–81	6–15 (4–6)	TD Arena (4,369); Charleston, South Carolina
02/07/2013; 7:00 pm	at Furman	W 88–65	7–15 (5–6)	Timmons Arena (1,102); Greenville, South Carolina
02/09/2013; 7:00 pm	at Wofford	L 50–59	7–16 (5–7)	Benjamin Johnson Arena (1,604); Spartanburg, South Carolina
02/14/2013; 7:00 pm	Western Carolina	L 68–70	7–17 (5–8)	Greensboro Coliseum (2,163); Greensboro, North Carolina
02/17/2013; 2:00 pm	Appalachian State	L 68–76	7–18 (5–9)	Greensboro Coliseum (4,014); Greensboro, North Carolina
02/21/2013; 7:00 pm	at Chattanooga	W 94–68	8–18 (6–9)	McKenzie Arena (2,682); Chattanooga, Tennessee
02/23/2013; 8:00 pm	at Samford	L 71–75	8–19 (6–10)	Pete Hanna Center (2,864); Homewood, Alabama
02/27/2013; 7:00 pm	Georgia Southern	L 60–66	8–20 (6–11)	Greensboro Coliseum (2,115); Greensboro, North Carolina
03/02/2013; 7:00 pm	at Elon	L 66–80	8–21 (6–12)	Alumni Gym (1,711); Elon, North Carolina
2013 Southern Conference men's basketball tournament
03/09/2013; 6:00 pm, ESPN3	vs. Chattanooga; First Round	W 87–81	9–21	U.S. Cellular Center (3,013); Asheville, North Carolina
03/08/2013; 6:00 pm, ESPN3	vs. Elon; Quarterfinals	L 61–68	9–22	U.S. Cellular Center (4,689); Asheville, North Carolina
*Non-conference game. ^{#}Rankings from AP Poll. (#) Tournament seedings in parentheses. All times are in Eastern Time.
