= 2012–13 Georgia Southern Eagles men's basketball team =

American college basketball season

2012–13 Georgia Southern Eagles men's basketball
- Conference: Southern Conference
- South Division
- Record: 14–19 (7–11 SoCon)
- Head coach: Charlton Young (4th season)
- Assistant coaches: Clifford Reed; Pershin Williams; Chris Capko
- Home arena: Hanner Fieldhouse

2012–13 Southern Conference men's basketball standings
	Conf.				Overall
Team	W		L	PCT	W		L	PCT
North
Elon	13	–	5	.722	21	–	12	.636
Appalachian State	10	–	8	.556	15	–	16	.484
Western Carolina	9	–	9	.500	14	–	19	.424
Samford	9	–	9	.500	11	–	21	.344
Chattanooga	8	–	10	.444	13	–	19	.406
UNC Greensboro	6	–	12	.333	9	–	22	.290
South
Davidson †	17	–	1	.944	26	–	8	.765
College of Charleston	14	–	4	.778	24	–	11	.686
Georgia Southern	7	–	11	.389	14	–	19	.424
Wofford	7	–	11	.389	13	–	19	.406
The Citadel	5	–	13	.278	8	–	22	.267
Furman	3	–	15	.167	7	–	24	.226
† SoCon Tournament winner As of March 20, 2013; Rankings from AP Poll

The 2012–13 Georgia Southern Eagles men's basketball team represented Georgia Southern University during the 2012–13 NCAA Division I men's basketball season. The Eagles, led by fourth year head coach Charlton Young, played their home games at Hanner Fieldhouse and were members of the South Division of the Southern Conference. They finished the season 14–19, 7–11 in SoCon play to finish in a tie for third place in the South Division. They lost in the quarterfinals of the SoCon tournament to Davidson.

== Roster ==
Number	Name	Position	Height	Weight	Year	Hometown
0	Cleon Roberts	Guard	6–5	175	Freshman	Miami
1	Jesse Pernell	Guard	6–1	170	Sophomore	North Augusta, South Carolina
2	Sam Mike	Forward	6–7	225	Junior	Decatur, Georgia
3	Eric Ferguson	Forward	6–7	210	Junior	Statesboro, Georgia
4	Tracy Ham	Guard	5–8	137	Sophomore	McDonough, Georgia
5	Jelani Hewitt	Guard	6–2	185	Junior	Miramar, Florida
10	Marvin Baynham	Forward	6–6	217	Junior	Miami
11	Tre Bussey	Guard	6–2	185	Junior	Lithia Springs, Georgia
12	Brian Holmes	Guard	6–1	185	Junior	Sanford, Florida
14	Cole Rivers	Guard	6–0	185	Freshman	Suwanee, Georgia
23	Chris Daniels	Guard	6–5	200	Freshman	Decatur, Georgia
24	C. J. Reed	Guard	6–3	200	Senior	Daytona Beach, Florida
32	Cameron Baskerville	Forward	6–7	226	Senior	Marietta, Georgia
34	Kameron Dunnican	Forward	6–8	205	Sophomore	Sumter, South Carolina

== Schedule ==
Date time, TV	Opponent	Result	Record	Site (attendance) city, state
Regular season
11/09/2012*; 8:30 pm	at Valparaiso	L 54–85	0–1	Athletics-Recreation Center (3,864); Valparaiso, Indiana
11/13/2012*; 9:00 pm, NBCSN	at Charlotte	L 53–66	0–2	Dale F. Halton Arena (5,810); Charlotte, North Carolina
11/16/2012*; 7:00 pm	Webber International	W 87–64	1–2	Hanner Fieldhouse (964); Statesboro, Georgia
11/21/2012*; 7:00 pm	at Kennesaw State	W 62–46	2–2	KSU Convocation Center (1,036); Kennesaw, Georgia
11/24/2012*; 7:00 pm, ESPN3	at Maryland	L 53–70	2–3	Comcast Center (10,282); College Park, Maryland
11/28/2012; 7:00 pm	Elon	L 50–55	2–4 (0–1)	Hanner Fieldhouse (1,837); Statesboro, Georgia
12/01/2012; 1:00 pm	at Samford	L 48–57	2–5 (0–2)	Pete Hanna Center (1,150); Homewood, Alabama
12/08/2012*; 7:00 pm	Brewton-Parker	W 79–56	3–5	Hanner Fieldhouse (1,649); Statesboro, Georgia
12/15/2012*; 2:00 pm, ESPN3	at Virginia Tech; Continental Tire Las Vegas Classic	W 78–73	4–5	Cassell Coliseum (6,026); Blacksburg, Virginia
12/17/2012*; 8:00 pm	at Bradley; Continental Tire Las Vegas Classic	L 43–62	4–6	Carver Arena (6,140); Peoria, Illinois
12/22/2012*; 3:00 pm	vs. Mississippi Valley State; Las Vegas Classic	W 63–52	5–6	Orleans Arena (N/A); Paradise, Nevada
12/23/2012*; 6:15 pm	vs. North Florida; Las Vegas Classic	L 46–74	5–7	Orleans Arena (350); Paradise, Nevada
12/29/2012*; 3:00 pm	Georgia State	W 68–64 ^{OT}	6–7	Hanner Fieldhouse (1,129); Statesboro, Georgia
01/02/2013*; 8:00 pm	at UAB	L 61–65	6–8	Bartow Arena (3,189); Birmingham, Alabama
01/05/2013*; 7:00 pm	North Carolina A&T	L 65–71	6–9	Hanner Fieldhouse (1,012); Statesboro, Georgia
01/12/2013; 7:00 pm	at Wofford	L 53–71	6–10 (0–3)	Benjamin Johnson Arena (1,707); Spartanburg, South Carolina
01/14/2013; 7:00 pm	Davidson	W 70–57	7–10 (1–3)	Hanner Fieldhouse (1,716); Statesboro, Georgia
01/17/2013; 7:00 pm	College of Charleston	W 51–47	8–10 (2–3)	Hanner Fieldhouse (1,733); Statesboro, Georgia
01/19/2013; 7:00 pm	The Citadel	L 55–70	8–11 (2–4)	Hanner Fieldhouse (2,231); Statesboro, Georgia
01/24/2013; 7:00 pm	at Appalachian State	L 62–64 ^{OT}	8–12 (2–5)	George M. Holmes Convocation Center (1,292); Boone, North Carolina
01/26/2013; 2:00 pm	at Western Carolina	W 72–66	9–12 (3–5)	Ramsey Center (1,983); Cullowhee, North Carolina
01/31/2013; 7:00 pm	at Furman	L 74–81	9–13 (3–6)	Timmons Arena (1,120); Greenville, South Carolina
02/02/2013; 7:30 pm	Chattanooga	W 59–57	10–13 (4–6)	Hanner Fieldhouse (1,783); Statesboro, Georgia
02/07/2013; 7:00 pm	Appalachian State	L 86–91 ^{OT}	10–14 (4–7)	Hanner Fieldhouse (1,512); Statesboro, Georgia
02/09/2013; 7:30 pm	Western Carolina	L 62–71	10–15 (4–8)	Hanner Fieldhouse (2,127); Statesboro, Georgia
02/14/2013; 7:05 pm	at The Citadel	W 78–57	11–15 (5–8)	McAlister Field House (1,046); Charleston, South Carolina
02/16/2013; 4:00 pm, ESPN3	at College of Charleston	L 60–69	11–16 (5–9)	TD Arena (3,734); Charleston, South Carolina
02/21/2013; 7:00 pm	Wofford	L 47–53	11–17 (5–10)	Hanner Fieldhouse (1,241); Statesboro, Georgia
02/23/2013; 7:00 pm	Furman	W 78–61	12–17 (6–10)	Hanner Fieldhouse (1,379); Statesboro, Georgia
02/27/2013; 7:00 pm	at UNC Greensboro	W 66–60	13–17 (7–10)	Greensboro Coliseum (2,115); Greensboro, North Carolina
03/02/2013; 2:00 pm	at Davidson	L 48–83	13–18 (7–11)	John M. Belk Arena (3,556); Davidson, North Carolina
2013 Southern Conference men's basketball tournament
03/08/2013; 11:30 am, ESPN3	vs. Wofford; First Round	W 60–44	14–18	U.S. Cellular Center (2,920); Asheville, North Carolina
03/09/2013; 12:00 pm, ESPN3	vs. Davidson; Quarterfinals	L 59–86	14–19	U.S. Cellular Center (5,313); Asheville, North Carolina
*Non-conference game. ^{#}Rankings from AP Poll. (#) Tournament seedings in parentheses. All times are in Eastern Time.
