= 2012–13 Charleston Cougars men's basketball team =

American college basketball season

2012–13 Charleston Cougars men's basketball

CBI, First Round
- Conference: Southern Conference
- South Division
- Record: 24–11 (14–4 SoCon)
- Head coach: Doug Wojcik (1st season)
- Assistant coaches: Amir Abdur-Rahim (1st season); Ryan Freeburg; Jordan Mincy (1st season)
- Home arena: TD Arena

2012–13 Southern Conference men's basketball standings
	Conf.				Overall
Team	W		L	PCT	W		L	PCT
North
Elon	13	–	5	.722	21	–	12	.636
Appalachian State	10	–	8	.556	15	–	16	.484
Western Carolina	9	–	9	.500	14	–	19	.424
Samford	9	–	9	.500	11	–	21	.344
Chattanooga	8	–	10	.444	13	–	19	.406
UNC Greensboro	6	–	12	.333	9	–	22	.290
South
Davidson †	17	–	1	.944	26	–	8	.765
College of Charleston	14	–	4	.778	24	–	11	.686
Georgia Southern	7	–	11	.389	14	–	19	.424
Wofford	7	–	11	.389	13	–	19	.406
The Citadel	5	–	13	.278	8	–	22	.267
Furman	3	–	15	.167	7	–	24	.226
† SoCon Tournament winner As of March 20, 2013; Rankings from AP Poll

The 2012–13 College of Charleston Cougars men's basketball team represented the College of Charleston during the 2012–13 NCAA Division I men's basketball season. The Cougars, led by first year head coach Doug Wojcik, played their home games at the TD Arena and were members of the South Division of the Southern Conference. They finished the season 24–11, 14–4 in SoCon play to finish in second place in the South Division. They advanced to the championship game of the SoCon tournament before falling to Davidson. They were invited to the 2013 College Basketball Invitational where they lost in the first round to George Mason.

This was the Cougars final season as a member of the SoCon as they joined the Colonial Athletic Association beginning with the 2013–14 season.

== Roster ==
Number	Name	Position	Height	Weight	Year	Hometown
1	Adjehi Baru	Forward/Center	6–9	225	Sophomore	Abidjan, Ivory Coast
3	Anthony Thomas	Forward	6–7	207	Junior	Winston-Salem, North Carolina
4	Andrew Lawrence	Guard	6–1	175	Senior	London, Great Britain
5	Matt Sundberg	Forward	6–8	200	Senior	Kennesaw, Georgia
10	Pat Branin	Guard	6–1	190	Sophomore	Richmond, Virginia
11	Nori Johnson	Guard/Forward	6–5	209	Junior	Greer, South Carolina
13	Bart Benton	Guard	6–1	180	Senior	Monroe, Georgia
14	Theo Johnson	Guard/Forward	6–6	198	Freshman	Sacramento, California
20	Chad Cooke	Guard	6–0	175	Freshman	Bolingbrook, Illinois
22	Anthony Stitt	Guard	6–1	180	Sophomore	Charlotte, North Carolina
23	Trevonte Dixon	Guard	6–4	194	Sophomore	Florence, South Carolina
24	Canyon Barry	Guard	6–6	195	Freshman	Colorado Springs, Colorado
31	Harrison Bowne	Forward	6–6	230	Freshman	Hickory, North Carolina
33	David Wishon	Center	7–2	265	Sophomore	Concord, North Carolina
41	Judson Hall	Forward	6–6	200	Junior	Charlotte, North Carolina
44	Trent Wiedeman	Forward	6–8	255	Junior	Suwanee, Georgia
53	Willis Hall	Forward	6–6	235	Junior	Charlotte, North Carolina

== Schedule ==
Date time, TV	Opponent	Result	Record	Site (attendance) city, state
Exhibition
11/03/2012*; 7:00 pm	USC-Aiken	W 68—52		TD Arena; Charleston, South Carolina
Regular season
11/09/2012*; 7:30 pm	Towson	W 75–58	1–0	TD Arena (4,215); Charleston, South Carolina
11/15/2012*; 5:00 pm, ESPNU	St. John's; Charleston Classic	L 53–64	1–1	TD Arena (4,716); Charleston, South Carolina
11/16/2012*; 7:30 pm, ESPN3	Auburn; Charleston Classic	L 51–55	1–2	TD Arena (4,780); Charleston, South Carolina
11/18/2012*; 12:00 pm, ESPN3	Boston College; Charleston Classic	W 71–67	2–2	TD Arena (4,262); Charleston, South Carolina
11/24/2012*; 9:00 pm, ESPN3	at No. 24 Baylor	W 63–59	3–2	Ferrell Center (5,768); Waco, Texas
11/28/2012*; 7:30 pm, WMMP/ESPN3	at Charleston Southern	W 72–67	4–2	CSU Field House (1,001); Charleston, South Carolina
12/01/2012; 7:00 pm	at Elon	W 56–54	5–2 (1–0)	Alumni Gym (1,403); Elon, North Carolina
12/04/2012*; 9:00 pm, ESPNU	No. 5 Louisville	L 38–80	5–3	TD Arena (5,117); Charleston, South Carolina
12/13/2012*; 7:00 pm	Anderson	L 49–65	5–4	TD Arena (2,218); Charleston, South Carolina
12/18/2012*; 7:30 pm, ESPN3	Old Dominion	W 76–65	6–4	TD Arena (3,418); Charleston, South Carolina
12/22/2012*; 12:00 pm, WMMP/ESPN3	Coastal Carolina	W 60–51	7–4	TD Arena (3,622); Charleston, South Carolina
12/29/2012*; 2:00 pm	at Vermont	W 62–50	8–4	Patrick Gym (2,253); Burlington, Vermont
12/31/2012*; 4:00 pm	at Marist	W 85–75	9–4	McCann Field House (1,062); Poughkeepsie, New York
01/05/2013; 5:00 pm, WMMP/ESPN3	Furman	W 60–56	10–4 (2–0)	TD Arena (3,885); Charleston, South Carolina
01/10/2013; 7:30 pm, WMMP/ESPN3	Samford	L 57–62	10–5 (2–1)	TD Arena (3,610); Charleston, South Carolina
01/12/2013; 4:00 pm	Chattanooga	W 86–59	11–5 (3–1)	TD Arena (3,722); Charleston, South Carolina
01/14/2013; 7:30 pm, WMMP/ESPN3	at The Citadel	W 73–69	12–5 (4–1)	McAlister Field House (2,742); Charleston, South Carolina
01/17/2013; 7:00 pm	at Georgia Southern	L 47–51	12–6 (4–2)	Hanner Fieldhouse (1,733); Statesboro, Georgia
01/19/2013; 7:00 pm, WMMP/ESPN3	at Davidson	L 68–77	12–7 (4–3)	John M. Belk Arena (4,844); Davidson, North Carolina
01/24/2013; 7:00 pm	The Citadel	W 69–54	13–7 (5–3)	TD Arena (4,118); Charleston, South Carolina
01/26/2013; 7:00 pm, WMMP/ESPN3	at Wofford	W 79–50	14–7 (6–3)	Benjamin Johnson Arena (2,203); Spartanburg, South Carolina
01/30/2013; 7:00 pm	Appalachian State	W 72–59	15–7 (7–3)	TD Arena (3,530); Charleston, South Carolina
02/02/2013; 7:00 pm, WMMP/ESPN3	UNC Greensboro	W 81–59	16–7 (8–3)	TD Arena (4,369); Charleston, South Carolina
02/07/2013; 8:00 pm	at Samford	W 69–65	17–7 (9–3)	Pete Hanna Center (1,751); Homewood, Alabama
02/09/2013; 7:30 pm	at Chattanooga	W 71–68	18–7 (10–3)	McKenzie Arena (4,487); Chattanooga, Tennessee
02/14/2013; 7:30 pm, WMMP/ESPN3	Davidson	L 59–75	18–8 (10–4)	TD Arena (4,314); Charleston, South Carolina
02/16/2013; 4:00 pm, ESPN3	Georgia Southern	W 69–60	19–8 (11–4)	TD Arena (3,734); Charleston, South Carolina
02/20/2013; 7:00 pm	at Western Carolina	W 67–65	20–8 (12–4)	Ramsey Center (1,207); Collowhee, North Carolina
02/23/2013*; 4:00 pm	Gardner–Webb; BracketBusters	L 52–55	20–9	TD Arena (3,823); Charleston, South Carolina
02/28/2013; 7:30 pm, WMMP/ESPN3	Wofford	W 55–50	21–9 (13–4)	TD Arena (4,428); Charleston, South Carolina
03/02/2013; 4:00 pm	at Furman	W 74–50	22–9 (14–4)	Timmons Arena (1,143); Greenville, South Carolina
2013 SoCon tournament
03/09/2013; 8:30 pm, ESPN3	vs. Western Carolina; Quarterfinals	W 78–70	23–9	U.S. Cellular Center (4,689); Asheville, North Carolina
03/10/2013; 8:30 pm, ESPN3	vs. Elon; Semifinals	W 68–60	24–9	U.S. Cellular Center (5,866); Asheville, North Carolina
03/11/2013; 7:00 pm, ESPN2	vs. Davidson; Championship Game	L 55–74	24–10	U.S. Cellular Center (4,021); Asheville, North Carolina
2013 College Basketball Invitational
03/19/2013*; 7:00 pm, AXS TV	George Mason; First Round	L 77–78	24–11	TD Arena (1,713); Charleston, South Carolina
*Non-conference game. ^{#}Rankings from AP Poll. (#) Tournament seedings in parentheses. All times are in Eastern Time.
