= 2012–13 Davidson Wildcats men's basketball team =

American college basketball season

2012–13 Davidson Wildcats men's basketball

SoCon Tournament Champions SoCon South Division Champions

NCAA Tournament, Round of 64
- Conference: Southern Conference
- Record: 26–8 (17–1 SoCon)
- Head coach: Bob McKillop (24th season)
- Assistant coaches: Jim Fox; Matt McKillop; Ryan Mee
- Home arena: John M. Belk Arena

2012–13 Southern Conference men's basketball standings
	Conf.				Overall
Team	W		L	PCT	W		L	PCT
North
Elon	13	–	5	.722	21	–	12	.636
Appalachian State	10	–	8	.556	15	–	16	.484
Western Carolina	9	–	9	.500	14	–	19	.424
Samford	9	–	9	.500	11	–	21	.344
Chattanooga	8	–	10	.444	13	–	19	.406
UNC Greensboro	6	–	12	.333	9	–	22	.290
South
Davidson †	17	–	1	.944	26	–	8	.765
College of Charleston	14	–	4	.778	24	–	11	.686
Georgia Southern	7	–	11	.389	14	–	19	.424
Wofford	7	–	11	.389	13	–	19	.406
The Citadel	5	–	13	.278	8	–	22	.267
Furman	3	–	15	.167	7	–	24	.226
† SoCon Tournament winner As of March 20, 2013; Rankings from AP Poll

The 2012–13 Davidson Wildcats men's basketball team represented Davidson College during the 2012–13 NCAA Division I men's basketball season. The Wildcats, led by 24th year head coach Bob McKillop, played their home games at the John M. Belk Arena and were members of the Southern Conference (SoCon).

Davidson won the SoCon tournament by defeating College of Charleston in the championship game. The Wildcats earned an automatic berth to the NCAA tournament, where they were defeated by Marquette in the second round.

== Roster ==
Number	Name	Position	Height	Weight	Year	Hometown
1	Yousseff Mejri	Forward	6–7	183	Sophomore	Hammam-Lif, Tunisia
2	Mason Archie II	Guard	6–4	175	Sophomore	Indianapolis
4	Tyler Kalinoski	Guard	6–4	172	Sophomore	Overland Park, Kansas
5	JP Kuhlman	Guard	6–4	195	Senior	Ponte Vedra Beach, Florida
12	Nik Cochran	Guard	6–3	188	Senior	Vancouver, British Columbia
14	Clay Tormey	Guard	5–11	165	Junior	Chicago, Illinois
15	Jake Cohen	Forward	6–10	235	Senior	Berwyn, Pennsylvania
20	Jordan Barham	Guard	6–4	190	Freshman	Cleveland, Ohio
22	Ali Mackay	Forward	6–11	204	Sophomore	North Berwick, Scotland
23	Tom Droney	Guard	6–6	200	Junior	Pittsburgh, Pennsylvania
24	De'Mon Brooks	Forward	6–7	227	Junior	Charlotte, North Carolina
25	Jake Belford	Forward	6–9	210	Freshman	Battle Ground, Washington
34	Connor Perkey	Forward	6–8	195	Freshman	Atlanta
35	Chris Czerapowicz	Guard	6–7	200	Junior	Gothenburg, Sweden
40	Clint Mann	Forward	6–7	229	Senior	Overland Park, Kansas
	Brian Sullivan	Guard	5–11	170	Sophomore	Upper Arlington, Ohio

== Schedule ==
Date time, TV	Rank^{#}	Opponent^{#}	Result	Record	Site (attendance) city, state
Exhibition
11/01/2012*; 7:00 pm		Belmont Abbey	W 121–73		John M. Belk Arena; Davidson, North Carolina
Regular Season
11/09/2012*; 7:00 pm		Emory	W 93–67	1–0	John M. Belk Arena (3,721); Davidson, North Carolina
11/13/2012*; 2:00 am, ESPN		at New Mexico; ESPN Tip-Off Marathon	L 81–86	1–1	The Pit (14,277); Albuquerque, New Mexico
11/17/2012*; 7:00 pm		at Milwaukee	L 68–73	1–2	Klotsche Center (3,031); Milwaukee, Wisconsin
11/22/2012*; 2:00 pm, ESPN2		vs. Vanderbilt; Old Spice Classic	W 75–62	2–2	HP Field House (3,423); Orlando, Florida
11/23/2012*; 12:30 pm, ESPN		vs. West Virginia; Old Spice Classic	W 63–60	3–2	HP Field House (2,927); Orlando, Florida
11/25/2012*; 7:00 pm, ESPN2		vs. No. 17 Gonzaga; Old Spice Classic	L 67–81	3–3	HP Field House (4,121); Orlando, Florida
12/01/2012; 7:30 pm		at Chattanooga	W 81–55	4–3 (1–0)	McKenzie Arena (3,033); Chattanooga, Tennessee
12/05/2012*; 8:00 pm, ESPN3		Charlotte	L 69–73	4–4	John M. Belk Arena (5,267); Davidson, North Carolina
12/08/2012; 7:00 pm		Wofford	W 63–56	5–4 (2–0)	John M. Belk Arena (3,279); Davidson, North Carolina
12/15/2012*; 7:00 pm		UNC Wilmington	W 77–61	6–4	John M. Belk Arena (4,028); Davidson, North Carolina
12/22/2012*; 8:00 pm, NBCSN		at Drexel	L 58–69	6–5	Daskalakis Athletic Center (1,879); Philadelphia
12/29/2012*; 6:00 pm		at Richmond	W 70–64	7–5	Robins Center (6,071); Richmond, Virginia
01/02/2013*; 7:00 pm, ESPN2		at No. 1 Duke	L 50–67	7–6	Cameron Indoor Stadium (13,607); Durham, North Carolina
01/05/2013; 7:00 pm, ESPN3		UNC Greensboro	W 85–53	8–6 (3–0)	John M. Belk Arena (3,843); Davidson, North Carolina
01/12/2013; 4:30 pm		at Furman	W 81–73	9–6 (4–0)	Timmons Arena (2,459); Greenville, South Carolina
01/14/2013; 7:00 pm		at Georgia Southern	L 57–70	9–7 (4–1)	Hanner Fieldhouse (1,716); Statesboro, Georgia
01/17/2013; 7:00 pm		The Citadel	W 70–38	10–7 (5–1)	John M. Belk Arena (2,589); Davidson, North Carolina
01/19/2013; 7:00 pm, ESPN3		College of Charleston	W 77–68	11–7 (6–1)	John M. Belk Arena (4,844); Davidson, North Carolina
01/24/2013; 7:00 pm		at Western Carolina	W 79–74	12–7 (7–1)	Ramsey Center (4,178); Cullowhee, North Carolina
01/26/2013; 2:00 pm		at Appalachian State	W 79–56	13–7 (8–1)	Holmes Center (1,968); Boone, North Carolina
01/31/2013; 7:00 pm		Samford	W 71–51	14–7 (9–1)	John M. Belk Arena (3,120); Davidson, North Carolina
02/02/2013; 7:00 pm		at Wofford	W 68–57	15–7 (10–1)	Benjamin Johnson Arena (1,507); Spartanburg, South Carolina
02/07/2013; 7:00 pm		Western Carolina	W 73–59	16–7 (11–1)	John M. Belk Arena (3,561); Davidson, North Carolina
02/09/2013; 7:30 pm		Appalachian State	W 87–52	17–7 (12–1)	John M. Belk Arena (5,090); Davidson, North Carolina
02/14/2013; 7:30 pm, ESPN3		at College of Charleston	W 75–59	18–7 (13–1)	TD Arena (4,314); Charleston, South Carolina
02/16/2013; 7:05 pm		at The Citadel	W 72–57	19–7 (14–1)	McAlister Field House (2,015); Charleston, South Carolina
02/20/2013; 7:00 pm		Furman	W 73–36	20–7 (15–1)	John M. Belk Arena (3,433); Davidson, North Carolina
02/23/2013*; 3:00 pm, ESPNU		Montana; BracketBusters	W 93–87 ^{OT}	21–7	John M. Belk Arena (4,897); Davidson, North Carolina
02/27/2013; 7:00 pm		at Elon	W 69–63	22–7 (16–1)	Alumni Gym (1,832); Elon, North Carolina
03/02/2013; 2:00 pm		Georgia Southern	W 83–48	23–7 (17–1)	John M. Belk Arena (3,556); Davidson, North Carolina
2013 Southern Conference men's basketball tournament
03/09/2013; 12:00 pm, ESPN3		vs. Georgia Southern; Quarterfinals	W 86–59	24–7	U.S. Cellular Center (5,313); Asheville, North Carolina
03/10/2013; 6:00 pm, ESPN3		vs. Appalachian State; Semifinals	W 65–62	25–7	U.S. Cellular Center (5,866); Asheville, North Carolina
03/11/2013; 7:00 pm, ESPN2		vs. College of Charleston; Championship Game	W 74–55	26–7	U.S. Cellular Center (4,021); Asheville, North Carolina
2013 NCAA tournament
03/21/2013*; 3:10 pm, truTV	No. (14)	vs. (3) Marquette; Second Round	L 58–59	26–8	Rupp Arena (14,622); Lexington, Kentucky
*Non-conference game. ^{#}Rankings from AP Poll. (#) Tournament seedings in parentheses. All times are in Eastern Time.
