= 2012–13 Wofford Terriers men's basketball team =

American college basketball season

2012–13 Wofford Terriers men's basketball
- Conference: Southern Conference
- South Division
- Record: 13–19 (7–11 SoCon)
- Head coach: Mike Young (11th season)
- Assistant coaches: Paul Harrison; Gus Hauser; Cameron Rundles
- Home arena: Benjamin Johnson Arena

2012–13 Southern Conference men's basketball standings
	Conf.				Overall
Team	W		L	PCT	W		L	PCT
North
Elon	13	–	5	.722	21	–	12	.636
Appalachian State	10	–	8	.556	15	–	16	.484
Western Carolina	9	–	9	.500	14	–	19	.424
Samford	9	–	9	.500	11	–	21	.344
Chattanooga	8	–	10	.444	13	–	19	.406
UNC Greensboro	6	–	12	.333	9	–	22	.290
South
Davidson †	17	–	1	.944	26	–	8	.765
College of Charleston	14	–	4	.778	24	–	11	.686
Georgia Southern	7	–	11	.389	14	–	19	.424
Wofford	7	–	11	.389	13	–	19	.406
The Citadel	5	–	13	.278	8	–	22	.267
Furman	3	–	15	.167	7	–	24	.226
† SoCon Tournament winner As of March 20, 2013; Rankings from AP Poll

The 2012–13 Wofford Terriers men's basketball team represented Wofford College during the 2012–13 NCAA Division I men's basketball season. The Terriers, led by 11th year head coach Mike Young, played their home games at the Benjamin Johnson Arena and were members of the South Division of the Southern Conference.

They finished the season 13–19, 7–11 in SoCon play to finish in a tie for third place in the South Division. they lost in the first round of the SoCon tournament to Georgia Southern.

== Roster ==
Number	Name	Position	Height	Weight	Year	Hometown
1	Bryan Harris	Guard	6–2	180	Freshman	Oxon Hill, Maryland
2	Karl Cochran	Guard	6–1	170	Sophomore	Marietta, Georgia
3	John Swinton	Guard	6–2	185	Sophomore	Mt. Pleasant, South Carolina
4	Zach Korkowski	Forward	6–6	205	Freshman	Williamsburg, Virginia
5	Jarell Byrd	Forward	6–6	195	Sophomore	Lynn, Massachusetts
11	Indiana Faithfull	Guard	6–4	200	Sophomore	Sydney, Australia
12	James Long	Guard	5–11	180	Freshman	Charleston, West Virginia
13	Taylor Wagener	Guard	6–3	190	Senior	Charlotte, North Carolina
14	Aerris Smith	Forward	6–8	250	Junior	Charlotte, North Carolina
22	Zac Grossenbacher	Forward	6–8	220	Freshman	Parkersburg, West Virginia
24	Justin Gordon	Forward	6–6	195	Freshman	Charlotte, North Carolina
31	C.J. Neumann	Forward	6–7	220	Freshman	St. Paul, Minnesota
32	Spencer Collins	Guard	6–4	200	Freshman	Easley, South Carolina
33	Kevin Hickson	Forward	6–8	215	Freshman	Matthews, North Carolina
34	Lee Skinner	Forward	6–6	212	Sophomore	Lombard, Illinois

== Schedule ==
Date time, TV	Opponent	Result	Record	Site (attendance) city, state
Regular season
11/09/2012*; 7:00 pm	at Colorado	L 59–74	0–1	Coors Events Center (10,611); Boulder, Colorado
11/12/2012*; 7:00 pm	Webber International	W 87–54	1–1	Benjamin Johnson Arena (738); Spartanburg, South Carolina
11/16/2012*; 7:00 pm	at Ball State	L 61–66	1–2	John E. Worthen Arena (3,418); Muncie, Indiana
11/18/2012*; 7:00 pm	at Ohio	L 50–73	1–3	Convocation Center (4,718); Athens, Ohio
11/20/2012*; 7:00 pm	at Richmond	L 58–64	1–4	Robins Center (3,867); Richmond, Virginia
11/23/2012*; 2:00 pm	vs. Hampton; Nation of Coaches Classic	W 56–51	2–4	Trask Coliseum (1,853); Wilmington, North Carolina
11/24/2012*; 2:00 pm	at UNC Wilmington; Nation of Coaches Classic	L 37–49	2–5	Trask Coliseum (2,876); Wilmington, North Carolina
11/28/2012*; 7:00 pm	Winthrop	W 70–55	3–5	Benjamin Johnson Arena (787); Spartanburg, South Carolina
12/05/2012*; 7:00 pm	Gardner–Webb	W 54–42	4–5	Benjamin Johnson Arena (864); Spartanburg, South Carolina
12/08/2012; 7:00 pm	at Davidson	L 56–63	4–6 (0–1)	John M. Belk Arena (3,279); Davidson, North Carolina
12/18/2012*; 7:40 pm	at Jacksonville	W 94–52	5–6	Jacksonville Veterans Memorial Arena (3,191); Jacksonville, Florida
12/22/2012*; 2:00 pm, FS Ohio	at Xavier	W 56–55	6–6	Cintas Center (9,132); Cincinnati
12/30/2012*; 1:00 pm, RSN/ESPN3	at Virginia	L 39–74	6–7	John Paul Jones Arena (9,387); Charlottesville, Virginia
01/04/2013*; 8:00 pm	at Tulane	L 48–62	6–8	Avron B. Fogelman Arena (1,928); New Orleans
01/08/2013; 7:00 pm	Appalachian State	L 49–50	6–9 (0–2)	Benjamin Johnson Arena (1,176); Spartanburg, South Carolina
01/12/2013; 7:00 pm	Georgia Southern	W 71–53	7–9 (1–2)	Benjamin Johnson Arena (1,707); Spartanburg, South Carolina
01/14/2013; 7:00 pm	at Furman	L 65–69	7–10 (1–3)	Timmons Arena (1,405); Greenville, South Carolina
01/16/2013; 7:00 pm	at UNC Greensboro	L 52–71	7–11 (1–4)	Greensboro Coliseum (2,174); Greensboro, North Carolina
01/19/2013; 7:00 pm	at Elon	L 61–68	7–12 (1–5)	Alumni Gym (1,607); Elon, North Carolina
01/24/2013; 7:00 pm, ESPN3	Furman	W 63–50	8–12 (2–5)	Benjamin Johnson Arena (1,537); Spartanburg, South Carolina
01/26/2013; 7:00 pm, ESPN3	College of Charleston	L 50–79	8–13 (2–6)	Benjamin Johnson Arena (2,203); Spartanburg, South Carolina
01/31/2013; 7:05 pm	at The Citadel	L 63–69	8–14 (2–7)	McAlister Field House (1,774); Charleston, South Carolina
02/02/2013; 7:00 pm	Davidson	L 57–68	8–15 (2–8)	Benjamin Johnson Arena (1,507); Spartanburg, South Carolina
02/07/2013; 7:00 pm	Elon	W 60–50	9–15 (3–8)	Benjamin Johnson Arena (1,054); Spartanburg, South Carolina
02/09/2013; 7:00 pm	UNC Greensboro	W 59–50	10–15 (4–8)	Benjamin Johnson Arena (1,604); Spartanburg, South Carolina
02/11/2013; 7:00 pm	at Western Carolina	L 56–57	10–16 (4–9)	Ramsey Center (1,217); Cullowhee, North Carolina
02/14/2013; 8:00 pm	at Samford	L 33–40	10–17 (4–10)	Pete Hanna Center (528); Homewood, Alabama
02/16/2013; 7:00 pm	Chattanooga	W 78–58	11–17 (5–10)	Benjamin Johnson Arena (1,008); Spartanburg, South Carolina
02/21/2013; 7:00 pm	at Georgia Southern	W 53–47	12–17 (6–10)	Hanner Fieldhouse (1,241); Statesboro, Georgia
02/28/2013; 7:30 pm, ESPN3	at College of Charleston	L 50–55	12–18 (6–11)	TD Arena (4,428); Charleston, South Carolina
03/02/2013; 7:00 pm	The Citadel	W 69–62	13–18 (7–11)	Benjamin Johnson Arena (924); Spartanburg, South Carolina
2013 Southern Conference men's basketball tournament
03/08/2013; 11:30 am, ESPN3	vs. Georgia Southern; First Round	L 44–60	13–19	U.S. Cellular Center (2,920); Asheville, North Carolina
*Non-conference game. ^{#}Rankings from AP Poll. (#) Tournament seedings in parentheses. All times are in Eastern Time.
