= 2012–13 Samford Bulldogs basketball team =

American college basketball season

2012–13 Samford Bulldogs men's basketball
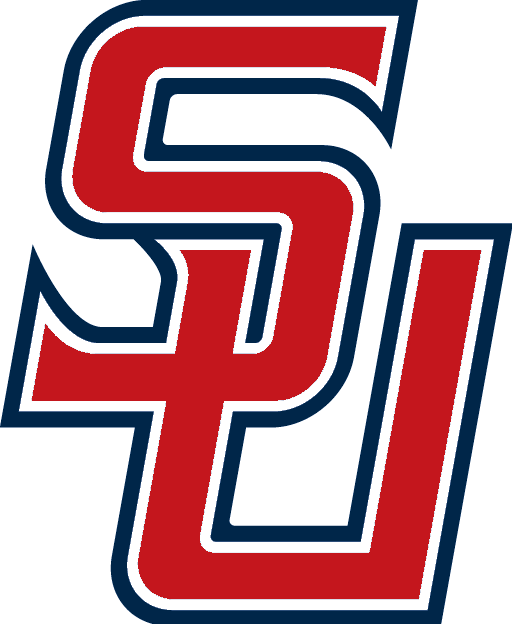
- Conference: Southern Conference
- North Division
- Record: 11–21 (9–9 SoCon)
- Head coach: Bennie Seltzer (1st season)
- Assistant coaches: Scott Padgett; Yasir Rosemond; Jake Headrick
- Home arena: Pete Hanna Center

2012–13 Southern Conference men's basketball standings
	Conf.				Overall
Team	W		L	PCT	W		L	PCT
North
Elon	13	–	5	.722	21	–	12	.636
Appalachian State	10	–	8	.556	15	–	16	.484
Western Carolina	9	–	9	.500	14	–	19	.424
Samford	9	–	9	.500	11	–	21	.344
Chattanooga	8	–	10	.444	13	–	19	.406
UNC Greensboro	6	–	12	.333	9	–	22	.290
South
Davidson †	17	–	1	.944	26	–	8	.765
College of Charleston	14	–	4	.778	24	–	11	.686
Georgia Southern	7	–	11	.389	14	–	19	.424
Wofford	7	–	11	.389	13	–	19	.406
The Citadel	5	–	13	.278	8	–	22	.267
Furman	3	–	15	.167	7	–	24	.226
† SoCon Tournament winner As of March 20, 2013; Rankings from AP Poll

The 2012–13 Samford Bulldogs basketball team represented Samford University during the 2012–13 NCAA Division I men's basketball season. The Bulldogs, led by first year head coach Bennie Seltzer, played their home games at the Pete Hanna Center and were members of the North Division of the Southern Conference.

They finished the season 11–21, 9–9 in SoCon play to finish in a tie for third place in the North Division. They lost in the first round of the SoCon tournament to Furman.

== Roster ==
Number	Name	Position	Height	Weight	Year	Hometown
2	Brandon Hayman	Guard	6–3	190	Sophomore	Braselton, Georgia
5	Russell Wilson	Guard	5–11	170	Freshman	Lake Wales, Florida
10	Connor Miller	Guard	6–3	170	Sophomore	Stanley, Wisconsin
11	Raijon Kelly	Guard	6–4	175	Sophomore	St. Paul, Minnesota
12	Tony Thompson	Guard	5–11	160	Junior	Florissant, Missouri
14	Clide Geffrard Jr.	Forward	6–5	215	Freshman	Pompano Beach, Florida
15	Hamilton Bailey	Guard	6–4	190	Junior	Atlanta
20	Mike Fitzpatrick	Guard	6–3	185	Freshman	Wheaton, Illinois
21	Gregg Wooten	Guard	6–2	195	Junior	Memphis, Tennessee
23	Jaylen Beckham	Guard	6–0	160	Freshman	Lexington, Kentucky
24	Will Cook	Guard	6–4	185	Junior	Dallas
32	Tim Williams	Forward	6–8	210	Freshman	Chicago, Illinois
33	Levi Barnes	Center	6–10	205	Junior	Douglasville, Georgia
35	Tyler Hood	Forward	6–6	210	Sophomore	Lenoir City, Tennessee

== Schedule ==
Date time, TV	Opponent	Result	Record	Site (attendance) city, state
Exhibition
11/06/2012*; 7:00 pm	Miles	W 87–59		Pete Hanna Center; Homewood, Alabama
Regular season
11/09/2012*; 7:00 pm	at Austin Peay	L 64–75	0–1	Dunn Center (2,315); Clarksville, Tennessee
11/11/2012*; 7:00 pm	Martin Methodist	W 59–40	1–1	Pete Hanna Center (1,272); Homewood, Alabama
11/15/2012*; 6:00 pm, ESPN3	at No. 2 Louisville; Battle 4 Atlantis	L 54–80	1–2	KFC Yum! Center (20,016); Louisville, Kentucky
11/17/2012*; 7:00 pm	at No. 17 Memphis; Battle 4 Atlantis	L 54–65	1–3	FedEx Forum (16,275); Memphis, Tennessee
11/21/2012*; 4:30 pm	vs. Toledo; Battle 4 Atlantis	L 69–82	1–4	Alico Arena (1,370); Fort Myers, Florida
11/22/2012*; 3:30 pm	vs. Alcorn State; Battle 4 Atlantis	L 65–69 ^{OT}	1–5	Alico Arena (676); Fort Myers, Florida
11/24/2012*; 7:00 pm	Texas-Arlington	L 58–65	1–6	Pete Hanna Center (417); Homewood, Alabama
11/28/2012*; 7:00 pm	Florida Gulf Coast	L 62–86	1–7	Pete Hanna Center (1,087); Homewood, Alabama
12/01/2012; 12:00 pm	Georgia Southern	W 57–48	2–7 (1–0)	Pete Hanna Center (1,150); Homewood, Alabama
12/04/2012*; 6:00 pm, FS South/ESPN3	at Kentucky	L 56–88	2–8	Rupp Arena (21,221); Lexington, Kentucky
12/08/2012*; 1:00 pm	at Bowling Green	L 42–57	2–9	Stroh Center (1,341); Bowling Green, Ohio
12/15/2012*; 7:00 pm	Sam Houston State	L 57–73	2–10	Pete Hanna Center (649); Homewood, Alabama
12/19/2012*; 7:00 pm	at Tennessee–Martin	W 75–62	3–10	Skyhawk Arena (792); Martin, Tennessee
12/29/2012*; 1:00 pm, BTN	at Wisconsin	L 51–87	3–11	Kohl Center (16,376); Madison, Wisconsin
01/05/2013; 7:00 pm	Chattanooga	L 70–74	3–12 (1–1)	Pete Hanna Center (1,127); Homewood, Alabama
01/10/2013; 6:30 pm, ESPN3	College of Charleston	W 62–57	4–12 (2–1)	TD Arena (3,610); Charleston, South Carolina
01/12/2013; 6:05 pm	at The Citadel	W 69–65	5–12 (3–1)	McAlister Field House (1,038); Charleston, South Carolina
01/17/2013; 7:00 pm	Western Carolina	W 64–60	6–12 (4–1)	Pete Hanna Center (1,287); Homewood, Alabama
01/19/2013; 7:00 pm	Appalachian State	W 72–68	7–12 (5–1)	Pete Hanna Center (2,236); Homewood, Alabama
01/24/2013; 6:00 pm	at UNC Greensboro	L 64–66	7–13 (5–2)	Greensboro Coliseum (1,902); Greensboro, North Carolina
01/31/2013; 6:00 pm	at Davidson	L 51–71	7–14 (5–3)	John M. Belk Arena (3,120); Davidson, North Carolina
02/02/2013; 6:00 pm	at Elon	L 66–77	7–15 (5–4)	Alumni Gym (1,607); Elon, North Carolina
02/07/2013; 7:00 pm	College of Charleston	L 65–69	7–16 (5–5)	Pete Hanna Center (1,751); Homewood, Alabama
02/09/2013; 7:00 pm, ESPN3	The Citadel	W 79–67	8–16 (6–5)	Pete Hanna Center (2,342); Homewood, Alabama
02/11/2013; 6:30 pm	at Chattanooga	L 59–62 ^{OT}	8–17 (6–6)	McKenzie Arena (2,976); Chattanooga, Tennessee
02/14/2013; 7:00 pm	Wofford	W 40–33	9–17 (7–6)	Pete Hanna Center (528); Homewood, Alabama
02/16/2013; 3:00 pm	at Furman	W 64–53	10–17 (8–6)	Timmons Arena (903); Greenville, South Carolina
02/21/2013; 7:00 pm	Elon	L 62–63	10–18 (8–7)	Pete Hanna Center (2,038); Homewood, Alabama
02/23/2013; 7:00 pm	UNC Greensboro	W 75–71	11–18 (9–7)	Pete Hanna Center (2,864); Homewood, Alabama
02/28/2013; 6:00 pm	at Appalachian State	L 67–70 ^{2OT}	11–19 (9–8)	George M. Holmes Convocation Center (838); Boone, North Carolina
03/02/2013; 3:30 pm	at Western Carolina	L 54–56 ^{OT}	11–20 (9–9)	Ramsey Center (1,807); Collowhee, North Carolina
2013 Southern Conference men's basketball tournament
03/08/2013; 1:00 pm, ESPN3	vs. Furman; First Round	L 51–55	11–21	U.S. Cellular Center (2,920); Asheville, North Carolina
*Non-conference game. ^{#}Rankings from AP Poll. (#) Tournament seedings in parentheses. All times are in Central Time.
