= 2012–13 Western Carolina Catamounts men's basketball team =

American college basketball season

2012–13 Western Carolina Catamounts men's basketball
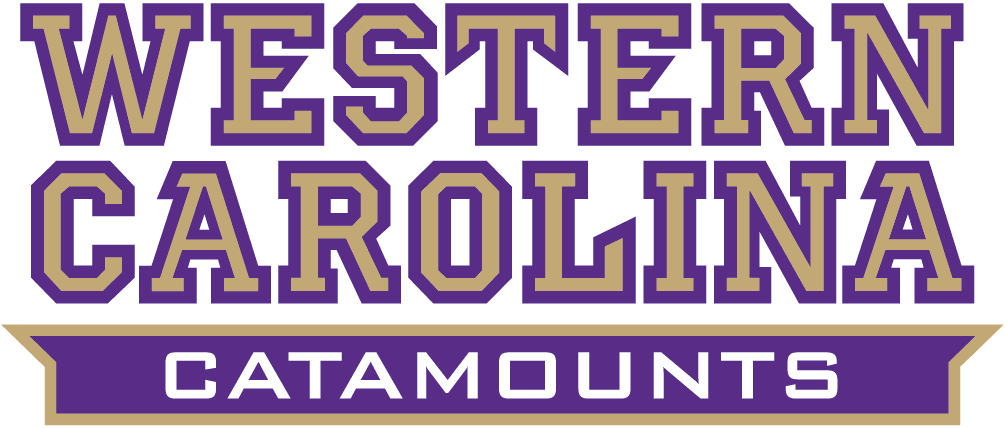
- Conference: Southern Conference
- North Division
- Record: 14–19 (9–9 SoCon)
- Head coach: Larry Hunter (8th season)
- Assistant coaches: Anquell McCollum; Eric Wilson; Brigham Waginger
- Home arena: Ramsey Center

2012–13 Southern Conference men's basketball standings
	Conf.				Overall
Team	W		L	PCT	W		L	PCT
North
Elon	13	–	5	.722	21	–	12	.636
Appalachian State	10	–	8	.556	15	–	16	.484
Western Carolina	9	–	9	.500	14	–	19	.424
Samford	9	–	9	.500	11	–	21	.344
Chattanooga	8	–	10	.444	13	–	19	.406
UNC Greensboro	6	–	12	.333	9	–	22	.290
South
Davidson †	17	–	1	.944	26	–	8	.765
College of Charleston	14	–	4	.778	24	–	11	.686
Georgia Southern	7	–	11	.389	14	–	19	.424
Wofford	7	–	11	.389	13	–	19	.406
The Citadel	5	–	13	.278	8	–	22	.267
Furman	3	–	15	.167	7	–	24	.226
† SoCon Tournament winner As of March 20, 2013; Rankings from AP Poll

The 2012–13 Western Carolina Catamounts men's basketball team represented Western Carolina University during the 2012–13 NCAA Division I men's basketball season. The Catamounts, led by eighth year head coach Larry Hunter, played their home games at the Ramsey Center and were members of the North Division of the Southern Conference. They finished the season 14–19, 9–9 in SoCon play to finish in a tie for third place in the North Division. They lost in the quarterfinals of the SoCon tournament to the College of Charleston.

== Roster ==
Number	Name	Position	Height	Weight	Year	Hometown
0	Tom Tankelewicz	Forward	6–4	180	Junior	Apex, North Carolina
1	Kenneth Hall	Forward	6–7	210	Sophomore	Dallas
2	Mike Brown	Guard	6–3	175	Freshman	Charlotte, North Carolina
3	Rhett Harrelson	Guard	5–10	170	Freshman	Enterprise, Alabama
4	Torrion Brummitt	Forward	6–7	240	Freshman	Columbus, Georgia
5	Trey Sumler	Guard	6–2	175	Junior	Rocky Mount, North Carolina
13	Brandon Littlejohn	Guard	5–11	175	Freshman	Lawndale, North Carolina
14	Josh Mendenhall	Forward	6–8	180	Junior	Greenville, South Carolina
23	Justin Browning	Forward	6–4	175	Freshman	Sylacauga, Alabama
24	Brandon Boggs	Guard	6–5	190	Junior	Greenville, South Carolina
25	James Sinclair	Guard	6–3	180	Sophomore	Savannah, Georgia
32	Tawaski King	Forward	6–8	245	Junior	Dublin, Georgia
40	Preston Ross	Forward	6–4	220	Junior	Fayetteville, North Carolina

== Schedule ==
Date time, TV	Opponent	Result	Record	Site (attendance) city, state
Regular season
11/09/2012*; 7:00 pm, WMYA	at UNC Asheville	L 61–71	0–1	Kimmel Arena (2,759); Asheville, North Carolina
11/11/2012*; 7:00 pm	Mars Hill	W 95–68	1–1	Ramsey Center (1,208); Cullowhee, North Carolina
11/15/2012*; 8:00 pm	at Wichita State; Cancún Challenge	L 63–79	1–2	Charles Koch Arena (10,186); Wichita, Kansas
11/17/2012*; 8:30 pm	at WKU; Cancún Challenge	L 81–92	1–3	E. A. Diddle Arena (5,124); Bowling Green, Kentucky
11/20/2012*; 1:30 pm	vs. Austin Peay; Cancún Challenge	L 71–72	1–4	Moon Palace Resort (902); Cancún, Mexico
11/21/2012*; 1:30 pm	vs. Howard; Cancún Challenge	W 69–67	2–4	Moon Palace Resort (302); Cancún, Mexico
11/28/2012; 7:00 pm	at Furman	W 79–65	3–4 (1–0)	Timmons Arena (957); Greenville, South Carolina
12/01/2012*; 7:30 pm	at Eastern Kentucky	L 70–72	3–5	Alumni Coliseum (1,600); Richmond, Kentucky
12/04/2012*; 8:00 pm	at No. 13 Illinois	L 64–72	3–6	Assembly Hall (14,191); Champaign, Illinois
12/08/2012; 4:30 pm	Appalachian State	W 70–64	4–6 (2–0)	Ramsey Center (3,051); Cullowhee, North Carolina
12/15/2012*; 12:00 pm, ESPN3	at No. 15 Georgetown	L 68–81	4–7	Verizon Center (7,341); Washington, D.C.
12/21/2012*; 7:00 pm, FS South/ESPN3	at Tennessee	L 52–66	4–8	Thompson–Boling Arena (15,109); Knoxville, Tennessee
12/31/2012*; 2:00 pm	Liberty	L 62–63	4–9	Ramsey Center (764); Cullowhee, North Carolina
01/05/2013; 7:05 pm	at The Citadel	W 72–55	5–9 (3–0)	McAlister Field House (1,247); Charleston, South Carolina
01/07/2013*; 7:00 pm	Warren Wilson	W 78–53	6–9	Ramsey Center (423); Cullowhee, North Carolina
01/12/2013; 2:00 pm	UNC Greensboro	W 62–59	7–9 (4–0)	Ramsey Center (1,634); Cullowhee, North Carolina
01/14/2013; 7:00 pm	Elon	L 67–80	7–10 (4–1)	Ramsey Center (2,161); Cullowhee, North Carolina
01/17/2013; 8:00 pm	at Samford	L 60–64	7–11 (4–2)	Pete Hanna Center (1,287); Homewood, Alabama
01/19/2013; 7:00 pm	at Chattanooga	W 90–81	8–11 (5–2)	McKenzie Arena (3,273); Chattanooga, Tennessee
01/24/2013; 7:00 pm	Davidson	L 74–79	8–12 (5–3)	Ramsey Center (4,178); Cullowhee, North Carolina
01/26/2013; 2:00 pm	Georgia Southern	L 66–72	8–13 (5–4)	Ramsey Center (1,983); Cullowhee, North Carolina
02/02/2013; 4:30 pm, ESPN3	at Appalachian State	L 65–74	8–14 (5–5)	George M. Holmes Convocation Center (2,852); Boone, North Carolina
02/07/2013; 7:00 pm	at Davidson	L 59–73	8–15 (5–6)	John M. Belk Arena (3,561); Davidson, North Carolina
02/09/2013; 7:30 pm	at Georgia Southern	W 71–62	9–15 (6–6)	Hanner Fieldhouse (2,127); Statesboro, Georgia
02/11/2013; 7:00 pm	Wofford	W 57–56	10–15 (7–6)	Ramsey Center (1,217); Cullowhee, North Carolina
02/14/2013; 7:00 pm	at UNC Greensboro	W 70–68	11–15 (8–6)	Greensboro Coliseum (2,163); Greensboro, North Carolina
02/16/2013; 7:00 pm	at Elon	L 73–80 ^{OT}	11–16 (8–7)	Alumni Gym (1,742); Elon, North Carolina
02/20/2013; 7:00 pm	College of Charleston	L 65–67	11–17 (8–8)	Ramsey Center (1,207); Cullowhee, North Carolina
02/23/2013*; 2:00 pm	Coastal Carolina; BracketBusters	W 80–70	12–17	Ramsey Center (1,127); Cullowhee, North Carolina
02/28/2013; 7:00 pm	Chattanooga	L 72–81	12–18 (8–9)	Ramsey Center (897); Cullowhee, North Carolina
03/02/2013; 4:30 pm	Samford	W 56–54 ^{OT}	13–18 (9–9)	Ramsey Center (1,807); Cullowhee, North Carolina
2013 Southern Conference men's basketball tournament
03/08/2013; 8:30 pm, ESPN3	vs. The Citadel; First Round	W 76–61	14–18	U.S. Cellular Center (3,013); Asheville, North Carolina
03/09/2013; 8:30 pm, ESPN3	vs. College of Charleston; Quarterfinals	L 70–78	14–19	U.S. Cellular Center (4,689); Asheville, North Carolina
*Non-conference game. ^{#}Rankings from AP Poll. (#) Tournament seedings in parentheses. All times are in Eastern Time.
