= 2012–13 Elon Phoenix men's basketball team =

American college basketball season

2012–13 Elon Phoenix men's basketball
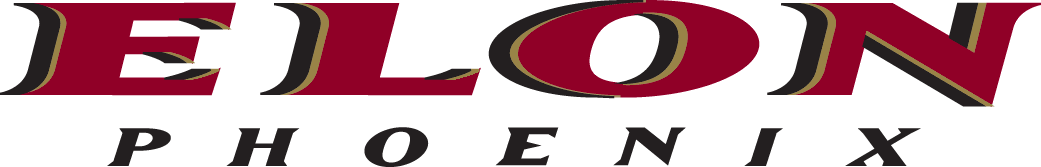

SoCon North Division Champions

CIT, First Round
- Conference: Southern Conference
- North Division
- Record: 21–12 (13–5 SoCon)
- Head coach: Matt Matheny (4th season)
- Assistant coaches: Tim Sweeney; Will Roberson; Jack Wooten
- Home arena: Alumni Gym

2012–13 Southern Conference men's basketball standings
	Conf.				Overall
Team	W		L	PCT	W		L	PCT
North
Elon	13	–	5	.722	21	–	12	.636
Appalachian State	10	–	8	.556	15	–	16	.484
Western Carolina	9	–	9	.500	14	–	19	.424
Samford	9	–	9	.500	11	–	21	.344
Chattanooga	8	–	10	.444	13	–	19	.406
UNC Greensboro	6	–	12	.333	9	–	22	.290
South
Davidson †	17	–	1	.944	26	–	8	.765
College of Charleston	14	–	4	.778	24	–	11	.686
Georgia Southern	7	–	11	.389	14	–	19	.424
Wofford	7	–	11	.389	13	–	19	.406
The Citadel	5	–	13	.278	8	–	22	.267
Furman	3	–	15	.167	7	–	24	.226
† SoCon Tournament winner As of March 20, 2013; Rankings from AP Poll

The 2012–13 Elon Phoenix men's basketball team represented Elon University during the 2012–13 NCAA Division I men's basketball season. The Phoenix, led by fourth year head coach Matt Matheny, played their home games at Alumni Gym and were members of the North Division of the Southern Conference. They finished the season 21–12, 13–5 in SoCon play to win the North Division championship. They advanced to the semifinals of the SoCon tournament where they lost to the College of Charleston. They were invited to the 2013 CIT, their first ever Division I postseason tournament appearance, where they lost in the first round to Canisius.

== Roster ==
Number	Name	Position	Height	Weight	Year	Hometown
0	Josh Bonney	Guard	5–10	175	Senior	Houston, Texas
3	Tanner Samson	Guard	6–4	193	Freshman	Littleton, Colorado
5	Sam Hershberger	Guard	6–0	175	Freshman	Vandalia, Ohio
10	Austin Hamilton	Guard	5–10	180	Sophomore	Herndon, Virginia
11	Kevin Blake	Guard	6–3	190	Sophomore	Toronto, Canada
12	Roger Dugas	Forward	6–8	215	Senior	Georgeville, Canada
14	John Moody	Guard	6–4	200	Senior	Asheville, North Carolina
15	Tony Sabato	Center	6–7	225	Freshman	Cincinnati, Ohio
20	Jack Isenbarger	Guard	6–2	180	Junior	Zionsville, Indiana
21	Ryley Beaumont	Forward	6–7	220	Junior	Millersville, Maryland
23	Egheosa Edomwonyi	Forward	6–7	235	Junior	Newark, New Jersey
24	Sebastian Koch	Guard	6–8	200	Junior	Munich, Germany
30	Wes Brewer	Forward	6–7	235	Freshman	Burlington, North Carolina
31	Lucas Troutman	Forward	6–10	220	Junior	Belton, South Carolina
32	Ryan Winters	Forward	6–7	210	Sophomore	Denver, Colorado
45	Aaron Smith	Guard	5–11	175	Senior	Raleigh, North Carolina

== Schedule ==
Date time, TV	Opponent	Result	Record	Site (attendance) city, state
Regular season
11/03/2012*; 7:00 pm	Ferrum	W 103–49		Alumni Gym; Elon, North Carolina
Regular season
11/10/2012*; 2:00 pm	at Butler; Maui Invitational Opening Round	L 59–74	0–1	Hinkle Fieldhouse (6,309); Indianapolis
11/13/2012*; 7:00 pm	Bridgewater	W 95–51	1–1	Alumni Gym (752); Elon, North Carolina
11/17/2012*; 2:00 pm	Colgate; Maui Invitational Regional Games	W 81–72	2–1	Alumni Gym (1,107); Elon, North Carolina
11/18/2012*; 4:30 pm	Florida Atlantic; Maui Invitational Tournament	W 62–59 ^{OT}	3–1	Alumni Gym (908); Elon, North Carolina
11/21/2012*; 7:00 pm	at South Carolina	W 65–53	4–1	Colonial Life Arena (6,754); Columbia, South Carolina
11/24/2012*; 5:00 pm	at VMI	L 81–90	4–2	Cameron Hall (1,272); Lexington, Virginia
11/28/2012; 7:00 pm	at Georgia Southern	W 55–50	5–2 (1–0)	Hanner Fieldhouse (1,837); Statesboro, Georgia
12/01/2012; 7:00 pm	College of Charleston	L 54–56	5–3 (1–1)	Alumni Gym (1,403); Elon, North Carolina
12/04/2012; 7:00 pm	Dartmouth	W 71–49	6–3	Alumni Gym (1,072); Elon, North Carolina
12/15/2012*; 12:00 pm	at Massachusetts; Hall of Fame Showcase	L 73–78 ^{OT}	6–4	William D. Mullins Memorial Center (3,085); Amherst, Massachusetts
12/20/2012*; 7:00 pm, ESPNU	at No. 1 Duke	L 54–76	6–5	Cameron Indoor Stadium (9,314); Durham, North Carolina
12/22/2012*; 4:00 pm	at Columbia	W 70–69	7–5	Levien Gymnasium (1,053); New York City
12/31/2012*; 2:00 pm	Manchester	W 84–49	8–5	Alumni Gym (722); Elon, North Carolina
01/05/2013*; 12:00 pm	Princeton	L 64–74	8–6	Alumni Gym (1,607); Elon, North Carolina
01/12/2013; 4:30 pm	at Appalachian State	L 70–80	8–7 (1–2)	George M. Holmes Convocation Center (1,708); Boone, North Carolina
01/14/2013; 7:00 pm	at Western Carolina	W 80–67	9–7 (2–2)	Ramsey Center (2,161); Collowhee, North Carolina
01/17/2013; 7:00 pm	Furman	W 73–59	10–7 (3–2)	Alumni Gym (1,227); Elon, North Carolina
01/19/2013; 7:00 pm	Wofford	W 68–61	11–7 (4–2)	Alumni Gym (1,607); Elon, North Carolina
01/24/2013; 7:00 pm	Chattanooga	W 85–61	12–7 (5–2)	Alumni Gym (1,204); Elon, North Carolina
01/26/2013; 2:05 pm	at The Citadel	W 70–66	13–7 (6–2)	McAlister Field House (1,319); Charleston, South Carolina
01/31/2013; 7:00 pm	at UNC Greensboro	W 72–66	14–7 (7–2)	Greensboro Coliseum (2,898); Greensboro, North Carolina
02/02/2013; 7:00 pm	Samford	W 77–66	15–7 (8–2)	Alumni Gym (1,607); Elon, North Carolina
02/07/2013; 7:00 pm	at Wofford	L 50–60	15–8 (8–3)	Benjamin Johnson Arena (1,054); Spartanburg, South Carolina
02/09/2013; 4:00 pm	at Furman	W 64–60	16–8 (9–3)	Timmons Arena (1,131); Greenville, South Carolina
02/14/2013; 7:00 pm	Appalachian State	W 61–58	17–8 (10–3)	Alumni Gym (1,533); Elon, North Carolina
02/16/2013; 7:00 pm	Western Carolina	W 80–73 ^{OT}	18–8 (11–3)	Alumni Gym (1,742); Elon, North Carolina
02/21/2013; 8:00 pm	at Samford	W 63–62	19–8 (12–3)	Pete Hanna Center (2,038); Homewood, Alabama
02/23/2013; 7:48 pm, ESPN3	at Chattanooga	L 68–72	19–9 (12–4)	McKenzie Arena (3,623); Chattanooga, Tennessee
02/27/2013; 7:00 pm	Davidson	L 63–69	19–10 (12–5)	Alumni Gym (1,832); Elon, North Carolina
03/02/2013; 7:00 pm	UNC Greensboro	W 80–66	20–10 (13–5)	Alumni Gym (1,711); Elon, North Carolina
2013 Southern Conference men's basketball tournament
03/09/2013; 6:00 pm, ESPN3	vs. UNC Greensboro; Quarterfinals	W 68–61	21–10	U.S. Cellular Center (4,689); Asheville, North Carolina
03/10/2013; 8:30 pm, ESPN3	vs. College of Charleston; Semifinals	L 60–68	21–11	U.S. Cellular Center (5,866); Asheville, North Carolina
2013 CIT
03/20/2013*; 7:00 pm	at Canisius; First Round	L 53–69	21–12	Koessler Athletic Center (1,187); Buffalo, New York
*Non-conference game. ^{#}Rankings from AP Poll. (#) Tournament seedings in parentheses. All times are in Eastern Time.
