= 2012–13 Chattanooga Mocs basketball team =

American college basketball season

2012–13 Chattanooga Mocs men's basketball
- Conference: Southern Conference
- North Division
- Record: 13–19 (8–10 SoCon)
- Head coach: John Shulman (9th season)
- Assistant coaches: DeAntoine Beasley; Brent Jolly; Casey Long
- Home arena: McKenzie Arena

2012–13 Southern Conference men's basketball standings
	Conf.				Overall
Team	W		L	PCT	W		L	PCT
North
Elon	13	–	5	.722	21	–	12	.636
Appalachian State	10	–	8	.556	15	–	16	.484
Western Carolina	9	–	9	.500	14	–	19	.424
Samford	9	–	9	.500	11	–	21	.344
Chattanooga	8	–	10	.444	13	–	19	.406
UNC Greensboro	6	–	12	.333	9	–	22	.290
South
Davidson †	17	–	1	.944	26	–	8	.765
College of Charleston	14	–	4	.778	24	–	11	.686
Georgia Southern	7	–	11	.389	14	–	19	.424
Wofford	7	–	11	.389	13	–	19	.406
The Citadel	5	–	13	.278	8	–	22	.267
Furman	3	–	15	.167	7	–	24	.226
† SoCon Tournament winner As of March 20, 2013; Rankings from AP Poll

The 2012–13 Chattanooga Mocs basketball team represented the University of Tennessee at Chattanooga during the 2012–13 NCAA Division I men's basketball season. The Mocs, led by a ninth year head coach John Shulman, played their home games at the McKenzie Arena and were members of the North Division of the Southern Conference. They finished the season 13–19, 8–10 in SoCon play to finish in fifth place in the North Division. They lost in the first round of the SoCon tournament to UNC Greensboro.

== Roster ==
Number	Name	Position	Height	Weight	Year	Hometown
2	Dontay Hampton	Guard	6–1	176	Senior	Chattanooga, Tennessee
3	Lance Stokes	Forward	6–6	217	Sophomore	Orlando, Florida
4	Sam Watson	Forward	6–7	245	Junior	Farragut, Tennessee
5	Drew Baker	Forward	6–7	214	Junior	Knoxville, Tennessee
10	Martynas Bareika	Guard	6–4	208	Sophomore	Kėdainiai, Lithuania
11	Ronrico White	Guard	6–3	170	Sophomore	Knoxville, Tennessee
12	Gee McGhee	Guard	6–5	200	Freshman	Baton Rouge, Louisiana
14	Alex Bran	Guard	6–1	170	Freshman	Memphis, Tennessee
15	Eric Robertson	Guard	6–4	191	Freshman	Huntsville, Alabama
20	Drazen Zlovaric	Forward	6–9	220	Senior	Novi Sad, Serbia
22	Farad Cobb	Guard	6–0	160	Freshman	West Palm Beach, Florida
24	Casey Jones	Guard	6–5	185	Freshman	New Orleans, Louisiana
30	Z. Mason	Forward	6–5	238	Junior	Nashville, Tennessee
34	Jared Bryant	Forward	6–7	240	Sophomore	Cincinnati, Ohio

== Schedule ==
Date time, TV	Opponent	Result	Record	Site (attendance) city, state
Regular season
11/12/2012*; 7:00 pm	Tennessee Temple	W 88–53	1–0	McKenzie Arena (2,625); Chattanooga, Tennessee
11/15/2012*; 8:00 pm, Jayhawk TV	at No. 7 Kansas; CBE Classic	L 55–69	1–1	Allen Fieldhouse (16,300); Lawrence, Kansas
11/18/2012*; 3:00 pm	Southeast Missouri; CBE Classic	L 65–77	1–2	McKenzie Arena (N/A); Chattanooga, Tennessee
11/19/2012*; 7:00 pm	Troy; CBE Classic	L 61–68	1–3	McKenzie Arena (2,457); Chattanooga, Tennessee
11/20/2012*; 7:00 pm	Louisiana Tech; CBE Classic	L 63–71	1–4	McKenzie Arena (2,395); Chattanooga, Tennessee
11/24/2012*; 2:30 pm	at Kennesaw State	W 65–51	2–4	KSU Convocation Center (552); Kennesaw, Georgia
12/01/2012; 7:30 pm	Davidson	L 55–81	2–5 (0–1)	McKenzie Arena (3,033); Chattanooga, Tennessee
12/08/2012*; 7:00 pm	Eastern Kentucky	L 52–63	2–6	McKenzie Arena (2,317); Chattanooga, Tennessee
12/11/2012*; 8:00 pm, CSS	at LSU	L 67–80	2–7	Maravich Center (6,760); Baton Rouge, Louisiana
12/16/2012*; 3:00 pm	Mercer	L 53–63	2–8	McKenzie Arena (2,408); Chattanooga, Tennessee
12/21/2012*; 12:00 pm	Reinhardt	W 108–78	3–8	McKenzie Arena (2,291); Chattanooga, Tennessee
12/28/2012*; 7:00 pm	High Point; Dr. Pepper Classic	W 68–61	4–8	McKenzie Arena (2,568); Chattanooga, Tennessee
12/29/2012*; 7:00 pm	Utah Valley; Dr. Pepper Classic	W 76–69	5–8	McKenzie Arena (2,534); Chattanooga, Tennessee
01/02/2013*; 7:00 pm, ESPN3	at Georgia Tech	L 58–74	5–9	McCamish Pavilion (5,829); Atlanta
01/05/2013; 8:00 pm	at Samford	W 74–70	6–9 (1–1)	Pete Hanna Center (1,127); Homewood, Alabama
01/10/2013; 7:05 pm	at The Citadel	W 70–65	7–9 (2–1)	McAlister Field House (1,066); Charleston, South Carolina
01/12/2013; 4:00 pm	at College of Charleston	L 59–86	7–10 (2–2)	TD Arena (3,722); Charleston, South Carolina
01/17/2013; 7:00 pm	Appalachian State	W 91–88 ^{OT}	8–10 (3–2)	McKenzie Arena (2,787); Chattanooga, Tennessee
01/19/2013; 7:00 pm	Western Carolina	L 81–90	8–11 (3–3)	McKenzie Arena (3,273); Chattanooga, Tennessee
01/24/2013; 7:00 pm	at Elon	L 61–85	8–12 (3–4)	Alumni Gym (1,204); Elon, North Carolina
01/27/2013; 2:00 pm	at UNC Greensboro	L 69–77	8–13 (3–5)	Greensboro Coliseum (1,310); Greensboro, North Carolina
02/02/2013; 7:30 pm	at Georgia Southern	L 57–59	8–14 (3–6)	Hanner Fieldhouse (1,783); Statesboro, Georgia
02/07/2013; 7:00 pm	The Citadel	W 89–76	9–14 (4–6)	McKenzie Arena (2,549); Chattanooga, Tennessee
02/09/2013; 7:30 pm	College of Charleston	L 68–71	9–15 (4–7)	McKenzie Arena (4,487); Chattanooga, Tennessee
02/11/2013; 7:30 pm	Samford	W 62–59 ^{OT}	10–15 (5–7)	McKenzie Arena (2,976); Chattanooga, Tennessee
02/14/2013; 7:00 pm	Furman	W 83–49	11–15 (6–7)	McKenzie Arena (2,663); Chattanooga, Tennessee
02/16/2013; 7:00 pm	at Wofford	L 58–78	11–16 (6–8)	Benjamin Johnson Arena (1,008); Spartanburg, South Carolina
02/21/2013; 7:00 pm	UNC Greensboro	L 68–94	11–17 (6–9)	McKenzie Arena (2,682); Chattanooga, Tennessee
02/23/2013; 7:48 pm, ESPN3	Elon	W 72–68	12–17 (7–9)	McKenzie Arena (3,623); Chattanooga, Tennessee
02/28/2013; 7:00 pm	at Western Carolina	W 81–72	13–17 (8–9)	Ramsey Center (897); Collowhee, North Carolina
03/02/2013; 2:00 pm	at Appalachian State	L 60–86	13–18 (8–10)	George M. Holmes Convocation Center (2,102); Boone, North Carolina
2013 Southern Conference men's basketball tournament
03/08/2013; 6:00 pm, ESPN3	vs. UNC Greensboro; First Round	L 81–87	13–19	U.S. Cellular Center (3,013); Asheville, North Carolina
*Non-conference game. ^{#}Rankings from AP Poll. (#) Tournament seedings in parentheses. All times are in Eastern Time.
