= 2012–13 The Citadel Bulldogs basketball team =

American college basketball season

2012–13 The Citadel Bulldogs men's basketball
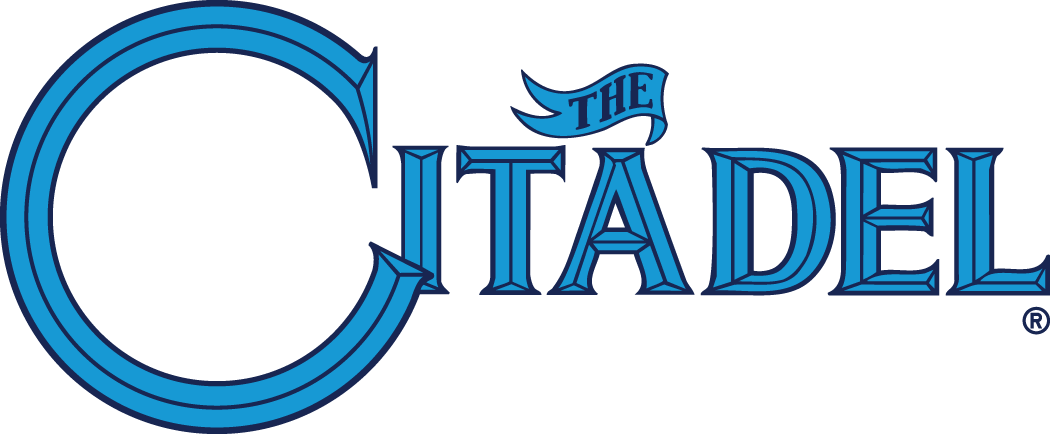
- Conference: Southern Conference
- South Division
- Record: 8–22 (5–13 SoCon)
- Head coach: Chuck Driesell
- Assistant coaches: Rob Burke; J.D. Powell; Damien Price
- Home arena: McAlister Field House

2012–13 Southern Conference men's basketball standings
| | Conf. | | | | Overall |
| Team | W | | L | PCT | W | | L | PCT |
|---|---|---|---|---|---|---|---|---|
North
| Elon | 13 | – | 5 | .722 | 21 | – | 12 | .636 |
| Appalachian State | 10 | – | 8 | .556 | 15 | – | 16 | .484 |
| Western Carolina | 9 | – | 9 | .500 | 14 | – | 19 | .424 |
| Samford | 9 | – | 9 | .500 | 11 | – | 21 | .344 |
| Chattanooga | 8 | – | 10 | .444 | 13 | – | 19 | .406 |
| UNC Greensboro | 6 | – | 12 | .333 | 9 | – | 22 | .290 |
South
| Davidson † | 17 | – | 1 | .944 | 26 | – | 8 | .765 |
| College of Charleston | 14 | – | 4 | .778 | 24 | – | 11 | .686 |
| Georgia Southern | 7 | – | 11 | .389 | 14 | – | 19 | .424 |
| Wofford | 7 | – | 11 | .389 | 13 | – | 19 | .406 |
| The Citadel | 5 | – | 13 | .278 | 8 | – | 22 | .267 |
| Furman | 3 | – | 15 | .167 | 7 | – | 24 | .226 |
† SoCon Tournament winner As of March 20, 2013; Rankings from AP Poll

The 2012–13 The Citadel Bulldogs basketball team represented The Citadel, The Military College of South Carolina in the 2012–13 NCAA Division I men's basketball season. The Bulldogs were led by third year head coach Chuck Driesell and played their home games at McAlister Field House. They were a member of the South Division of the Southern Conference. They finished the season 8–22, 5–13 in SoCon play to finish in fifth place in the South Division. They lost in the first round of the SoCon tournament to Western Carolina.

== Preseason ==
The Citadel signed two recruits in the early signing period. The Bulldogs also landed graduate enrollee Stephen Elmore, son of Maryland great Len Elmore. Elmore will have one year of eligibility after graduating in three years from Princeton University, where he played baseball. The Bulldogs also lost three players to transfer, DeVontae Wright (South Carolina–Aiken), Jordan Robertson (Davidson County Community College), and Bo Holston (Anderson University).

=== Recruiting ===
College recruiting information
| Name | Hometown | School | Height | Weight | Commit date |
|---|---|---|---|---|---|
| Raemond Robinson; SG | Goose Creek, SC | Goose Creek High School | 6 ft 2 in (1.88 m) | 190 lb (86 kg) | Sep 24, 2011 |
| Raemond Robinson; SG | Recruit ratings: (40) | | | | |
| Matt Van Scyoc; SF | Green Lake, WI | Green Lake High School | 6 ft 6 in (1.98 m) | 210 lb (95 kg) | Nov 9, 2011 |
| Matt Van Scyoc; SF | Recruit ratings: (40) | | | | |
| Janeil Jenkins; PG | Jacksonville, FL | The Miller School | 5 ft 10 in (1.78 m) | 175 lb (79 kg) | Jun 19, 2012 |
| Janeil Jenkins; PG | Recruit ratings: (NR) | | | | |
| Quinton Marshall; G | Raleigh, NC | | 6 ft 5 in (1.96 m) | N/A | |
| Quinton Marshall; G | Recruit ratings: No ratings found | | | | |
Overall recruit ranking:
Note: In many cases, Scout, Rivals, 247Sports, On3, and ESPN may conflict in their listings of height and weight.; In these cases, the average was taken. ESPN grades are on a 100-point scale.; Sources: "ESPN – Citadel Basketball Recruiting 2012". ESPN.; "2012 Team Ranking". Rivals.

== Roster ==
| Number | Name | Position | Height | Weight | Year | Hometown |
|---|---|---|---|---|---|---|
| 0 | Dylen Setzekorn | Guard/Forward | 6–7 | 194 | Sophomore | Gainesville, Georgia |
| 1 | Raemond Robinson | Guard/Forward | 6–3 | 189 | Freshman | Goose Creek, South Carolina |
| 3 | Janeil Jenkins | Guard | 5–10 | 175 | Freshman | Jacksonville, Florida |
| 10 | Marshall Harris III | Guard | 6–1 | 180 | Sophomore | San Antonio, Texas |
| 12 | Ashton Moore | Guard | 6–0 | 172 | Sophomore | Suffolk, Virginia |
| 21 | Michael Hundley | Forward | 6–9 | 180 | Sophomore | Farmington Hills, Michigan |
| 22 | Stephen Elmore | Forward | 6–6 | 220 | Senior | New York, New York |
| 24 | Lawrence Miller | Guard | 6–1 | 185 | Sophomore | Charlotte, North Carolina |
| 25 | C.J. Bray | Forward | 6–7 | 238 | Sophomore | Charleston, South Carolina |
| 30 | Matt van Scyoc | Guard/Forward | 6–6 | 218 | Freshman | Green Lake, Wisconsin |
| 31 | Mike Groselle | Center | 6–8 | 244 | Senior | Plano, Texas |
| 33 | Quinton Marshall | Guard | 6–5 | 205 | Freshman | Raleigh, North Carolina |
| 44 | P.J. Horgan | Forward | 6–8 | 220 | Sophomore | Rio Rancho, New Mexico |

== Schedule ==
| Date time, TV | Opponent | Result | Record | Site (attendance) city, state |
Regular Season
| November 10*; 4:00 pm | VMI; All-Military Classic | W 84–76 | 1–0 | McAlister Field House (1,180); Charleston, SC |
| November 11*; 4:00 pm | Air Force; All-Military Classic | L 70–77 | 1–1 | McAlister Field House (N/A); Charleston, SC |
| November 14*; 7:05 pm | Montreat | W 62–45 | 2–1 | McAlister Field House (822); Charleston, SC |
| November 17*; 7:05 pm | Union | W 92–50 | 3–1 | McAlister Field House (786); Charleston, SC |
| November 24*; 2:00 pm | Radford | L 61–74 | 3–2 | McAlister Field House (1,031); Charleston, SC |
| December 1; 7:00 pm | at UNC Greensboro | L 54–84 | 3–3 (0–1) | Greensboro Coliseum (2,035); Greensboro, NC |
| December 4*; 7:30 pm | at Charleston Southern | L 73–101 | 3–4 | CSU Field House (895); North Charleston, SC |
| December 15*; 7:00 pm | at Gardner–Webb | L 58–71 | 3–5 | Paul Porter Arena (1,640); Boiling Springs, NC |
| December 19*; 7:00 pm | at St. Bonaventure | L 57–97 | 3–6 | Reilly Center (3,286); St. Bonaventure, NY |
| December 22*; 4:00 pm, FS South/ESPN3 | at Georgia Tech | L 41–73 | 3–7 | McCamish Pavilion (7,769); Atlanta, GA |
| January 1*; 4:00 pm, ESPN3 | at Clemson | L 51–92 | 3–8 | Littlejohn Coliseum (7,124); Clemson, SC |
| January 5; 7:05 pm | Western Carolina | L 55–72 | 3–9 (0–2) | McAlister Field House (1,247); Charleston, SC |
| January 10; 7:05 pm | Chattanooga | L 65–70 | 3–10 (0–3) | McAlister Field House (1,066); Charleston, SC |
| January 12; 7:05 pm | Samford | L 65–69 | 3–11 (0–4) | McAlister Field House (1,038); Charleston, SC |
| January 14; 7:30 pm, ESPN3 | College of Charleston | L 69–73 | 3–12 (0–5) | McAlister Field House (2,742); Charleston, SC |
| January 17; 7:00 pm | at Davidson | L 38–70 | 3–13 (0–6) | John M. Belk Arena (2,589); Davidson, NC |
| January 19; 7:00 pm | at Georgia Southern | W 70–55 | 4–13 (1–6) | Hanner Fieldhouse (2,231); Statesboro, GA |
| January 24; 7:00 pm | at College of Charleston | L 54–69 | 4–14 (1–7) | TD Arena (4,118); Charleston, SC |
| January 26; 2:05 pm | Elon | L 66–70 | 4–15 (1–8) | McAlister Field House (1,319); Charleston, SC |
| January 31; 7:05 pm | Wofford | W 69–63 | 5–15 (2–8) | McAlister Field House (1,774); Charleston, SC |
| February 2; 4:00 pm, CSS | at Furman | W 84–79 | 6–15 (3–8) | Timmons Arena (2,122); Greenville, SC |
| February 7; 7:00 pm | at Chattanooga | L 76–89 | 6–16 (3–9) | McKenzie Arena (2,549); Chattanooga, TN |
| February 9; 8:00 pm, ESPN3 | at Samford | L 67–79 | 6–17 (3–10) | Pete Hanna Center (2,342); Homewood, AL |
| February 14; 7:05 pm | Georgia Southern | L 57–78 | 6–18 (3–11) | McAlister Field House (1,046); Charleston, SC |
| February 16; 7:05 pm | Davidson | L 57–72 | 6–19 (3–12) | McAlister Field House (2,015); Charleston, SC |
| February 20; 8:00 pm | Appalachian State | W 80–77 ^{OT} | 7–19 (4–12) | Holmes Center (1,822); Boone, NC |
| February 23*; 7:45 pm | at Presbyterian; BracketBusters | L 65–68 | 7–20 | Templeton Physical Education Center (1,780); Clinton, SC |
| February 28; 7:05 pm | Furman | W 68–57 | 8–20 (5–12) | McAlister Field House (2,046); Charleston, SC |
| March 2; 7:00 pm | at Wofford | L 62–69 | 8–21 (5–13) | Benjamin Johnson Arena (924); Spartanburg, SC |
2013 Southern Conference men's basketball tournament
| March 8; 8:30 pm, ESPN3 | vs. Western Carolina; First Round | L 61–76 | 8–22 | Asheville Civic Center (3,013); Asheville, NC |
*Non-conference game. (#) Tournament seedings in parentheses. All times are in Eastern Time.
