= 2013 Southern Conference men's basketball tournament =

- 2013 SoCon Tournament logo
- Classification: Division I
- Season: 2012–13
- Teams: 12
- Site: U.S. Cellular Center; Asheville, North Carolina
- Champions: Davidson (12th title)
- Winning coach: Bob McKillop (7th Title)
- Television: ESPN3, ESPN2

2012–13 Southern Conference men's basketball standings
	Conf.				Overall
Team	W		L	PCT	W		L	PCT
North
Elon	13	–	5	.722	21	–	12	.636
Appalachian State	10	–	8	.556	15	–	16	.484
Western Carolina	9	–	9	.500	14	–	19	.424
Samford	9	–	9	.500	11	–	21	.344
Chattanooga	8	–	10	.444	13	–	19	.406
UNC Greensboro	6	–	12	.333	9	–	22	.290
South
Davidson †	17	–	1	.944	26	–	8	.765
College of Charleston	14	–	4	.778	24	–	11	.686
Georgia Southern	7	–	11	.389	14	–	19	.424
Wofford	7	–	11	.389	13	–	19	.406
The Citadel	5	–	13	.278	8	–	22	.267
Furman	3	–	15	.167	7	–	24	.226
† SoCon Tournament winner As of March 20, 2013; Rankings from AP Poll

The 2013 Southern Conference men's basketball tournament took place between Friday, March 8 and Monday, March 11 in Asheville, North Carolina, at the U.S. Cellular Center. The entire tournament was streamed on ESPN3, with the Southern Conference Championship Game televised by ESPN2. The champion received an automatic bid into the 2013 NCAA tournament.

== Bracket ==
First round Friday, March 8
8	Wofford	44
9	Georgia Southern	60
5	Samford	51
12	Furman	55
7	Chattanooga	81
10	UNC Greensboro	87
6	Western Carolina	76
11	The Citadel	61

Quarterfinals; Saturday, March 9 ESPN3
1	Davidson	86
9	Georgia Southern	59
4	Appalachian State	74
12	Furman	60
2	Elon	68
10	UNC Greensboro	61
3	College of Charleston	78
6	Western Carolina	70

Semifinals; Sunday, March 10; ESPN3
1	Davidson	65
4	Appalachian State	62
2	Elon	60
3	College of Charleston	68

Championship Game; Monday, March 11; ESPN2
1	Davidson	74
3	College of Charleston	55

All times listed are Eastern
