= 2012–13 Duke Blue Devils men's basketball team =

American college basketball season

2012–13 Duke Blue Devils men's basketball

NCAA tournament, Elite Eight
- Conference: Atlantic Coast Conference

Ranking
- Coaches: No. 5
- AP: No. 6
- Record: 30–6 (14–4 ACC)
- Head coach: Mike Krzyzewski (33rd season)
- Assistant coaches: Chris Collins; Steve Wojciechowski; Jeff Capel
- MVP: 3: Seth Curry; Ryan Kelly; Mason Plumlee
- Captains: Seth Curry; Ryan Kelly; Mason Plumlee
- Home arena: Cameron Indoor Stadium Battle 4 Atlantis Champions

2012–13 ACC men's basketball standings
	Conf.				Overall
Team	W		L	PCT	W		L	PCT
No. 5 Miami (FL) †	15	–	3	.833	29	–	7	.806
No. 6 Duke	14	–	4	.778	30	–	6	.833
North Carolina	12	–	6	.667	25	–	11	.694
Virginia	11	–	7	.611	23	–	12	.657
NC State	11	–	7	.611	24	–	11	.686
Florida State	9	–	9	.500	18	–	16	.529
Maryland	8	–	10	.444	25	–	13	.658
Boston College	7	–	11	.389	16	–	17	.485
Georgia Tech	6	–	12	.333	16	–	15	.516
Wake Forest	6	–	12	.333	13	–	18	.419
Clemson	5	–	13	.278	13	–	18	.419
Virginia Tech	4	–	14	.222	13	–	19	.406
† 2013 ACC tournament winner As of April 2, 2013; Rankings from AP Poll

The 2012–13 Duke Blue Devils men's basketball team represented Duke University in the 2012–13 NCAA Division I men's basketball season. Returning as head coach was Hall of Famer Mike Krzyzewski. The team played its home games at Cameron Indoor Stadium in Durham, North Carolina as members of the Atlantic Coast Conference. They won the Battle 4 Atlantis tournament in the Bahamas, defeating Louisville in the championship game. The Blue Devils posted four victories against top 5 opponents (at the time of the game) and were undefeated (16–0) at home. Completing the season with 30 wins (and 6 losses; 14–4 in ACC play), Duke finished in second place in the ACC regular season standings. Duke was ranked in the top 10 of the AP poll all season long, including five weeks at #1. They lost in the quarterfinals of the ACC tournament to Maryland and subsequently received a two seed in the 2013 NCAA tournament. They defeated Albany in the Round of 64, #22 Creighton in the Round of 32, and #9 Michigan State in the Sweet Sixteen to reach the Elite Eight. Duke lost to #1 overall seed and eventual NCAA champion Louisville in the Elite Eight in Indianapolis, who reversed the game result from the meeting earlier in the season. Louisville later had the title vacated for a violation of NCAA rules. Duke finished #1 in the nation in the final RPI rankings.

== Class of 2012 signees ==
College recruiting
Name	Hometown	School	Height	Weight	Commit date
Rasheed Sulaimon; SG	Houston, TX	Strake Jesuit College Prep	6 ft 3 in (1.91 m)	175 lb (79 kg)	Feb 10, 2011
Rasheed Sulaimon; SG	Recruit ratings: Scout: Rivals: 247Sports: ESPN:				
Amile Jefferson; PF	Philadelphia, PA	Friends Central	6 ft 7 in (2.01 m)	190 lb (86 kg)	May 15, 2012
Amile Jefferson; PF	Recruit ratings: Scout: Rivals: 247Sports: ESPN:				
Overall recruit ranking:
Note: In many cases, Scout, Rivals, 247Sports, On3, and ESPN may conflict in their listings of height and weight.; In these cases, the average was taken. ESPN grades are on a 100-point scale.; Sources: "Duke Basketball Commitment List". Rivals.; "2012 Duke Basketball Commits". Scout.; "ESPN". ESPN.; "Scout.com Team Recruiting Rankings". Scout.; "2012 Team Ranking". Rivals.

== Roster ==
2012–13 Duke Blue Devils men's basketball team
Players
Coaches

Pos.	#	Name	Height	Weight	Year	Previous school	Hometown
G	2	Quinn Cook	6 ft 0 in (1.83 m)	175 lb (79 kg)	So	Oak Hill Academy	Bowie, Maryland
G	3	Tyler Thornton	6 ft 1 in (1.85 m)	195 lb (88 kg)	Jr	Gonzaga	Washington, D.C.
C	5	Mason Plumlee	6 ft 10 in (2.08 m)	235 lb (107 kg)	Sr	Christ School	Warsaw, Indiana
F	12	Alex Murphy	6 ft 8 in (2.03 m)	220 lb (100 kg)	RS Fr	South Kingstown	Wakefield, Rhode Island
F	13	Rodney Hood (redshirt)	6 ft 7 in (2.01 m)	205 lb (93 kg)	So	Meridian	Meridian, Mississippi
G	14	Rasheed Sulaimon	6 ft 4 in (1.93 m)	190 lb (86 kg)	Fr	Strake Jesuit College Prep	Houston, Texas
F	15	Josh Hairston	6 ft 7 in (2.01 m)	235 lb (107 kg)	Jr	Montrose Christian	Fredericksburg, Virginia
G	20	Andre Dawkins (redshirt)	6 ft 4 in (1.93 m)	200 lb (91 kg)	Sr	Atlantic Shores Christian	Chesapeake, Virginia
F	21	Amile Jefferson	6 ft 8 in (2.03 m)	195 lb (88 kg)	Fr	Friends Central School	Philadelphia, Pennsylvania
G	30	Seth Curry	6 ft 2 in (1.88 m)	180 lb (82 kg)	Sr	Charlotte Christian	Charlotte, North Carolina
F	34	Ryan Kelly	6 ft 11 in (2.11 m)	230 lb (104 kg)	Sr	Ravenscroft	Raleigh, North Carolina
C	40	Marshall Plumlee	6 ft 11 in (2.11 m)	225 lb (102 kg)	RS Fr	Christ School	Warsaw, Indiana
F	52	Todd Zafirovski	6 ft 9 in (2.06 m)	240 lb (109 kg)	Sr	Lake Forest Academy	Lake Forest, Illinois

Head coach

- Mike Krzyzewski

Assistant coach(es)

- Chris Collins
- Steve Wojciechowski
- Jeff Capel

Legend

- (C) Team captain
- (S) Suspended
- (I) Ineligible
- (W) Walk-on
- Injured
- Current redshirt

=== Depth chart ===
Pos.	Starting 5	Bench
C	Mason Plumlee	Marshall Plumlee
PF	Ryan Kelly	Amile Jefferson
SF	Rasheed Sulaimon	Josh Hairston
SG	Seth Curry	Alex Murphy
PG	Quinn Cook	Tyler Thornton

== Schedule ==
Date time, TV	Rank^{#}	Opponent^{#}	Result	Record	High points	High rebounds	High assists	Site (attendance) city, state
Exhibition
October 27, 2012*; 2:00 pm	No. 8	Western Washington	W 105–87		22 – Kelly, Plumlee	11 – Plumlee	4 – Kelly	Cameron Indoor Stadium (9,314); Durham, NC
November 1, 2012*; 7:00 pm	No. 8	Winston-Salem State	W 69–45		19 – Plumlee	10 – Plumlee	3 – Kelly	Cameron Indoor Stadium (9,314); Durham, NC
Non-conference regular season
November 9, 2012*; 7:00 pm, ESPNU	No. 8	Georgia State	W 74–55	1–0	19 – Plumlee	14 – Plumlee	4 – Kelly, Sulaimon	Cameron Indoor Stadium (9,314); Durham, NC
November 13, 2012*; 9:30 pm, ESPN	No. 9	vs. No. 3 Kentucky; Champions Classic	W 75–68	2–0	23 – Curry	6 – Sulaimon	5 – Sulaimon	Georgia Dome (22,847); Atlanta, GA
November 18, 2012*; 8:00 pm, ESPNU	No. 9	Florida Gulf Coast	W 88–67	3–0	28 – Plumlee	9 – Kelly, Plumlee	9 – Cook	Cameron Indoor Stadium (9,314); Durham, NC
November 22, 2012*; 3:30 pm, AXS TV	No. 5	vs. Minnesota; Battle 4 Atlantis Quarterfinals	W 89–71	4–0	25 – Curry	17 – Plumlee	4 – Cook	Imperial Arena (3,511); Nassau, Bahamas
November 23, 2012*; 7:00 pm, NBCSN	No. 5	vs. VCU; Battle 4 Atlantis semifinals	W 67–58	5–0	17 – Plumlee	10 – Plumlee	9 – Cook	Imperial Arena (3,474); Nassau, BAH
November 24, 2012*; 9:30 pm, NBCSN	No. 5	vs. No. 2 Louisville; Battle 4 Atlantis championship	W 76–71	6–0	16 – Plumlee	7 – Plumlee	6 – Cook	Imperial Arena (3,511); Nassau, BAH
November 28, 2012*; 9:30 pm, ESPN	No. 2	No. 3 Ohio State; ACC-Big Ten Challenge	W 73–68	7–0	21 – Plumlee	17 – Plumlee	8 – Cook	Cameron Indoor Stadium (9,314); Durham, NC
December 1, 2012*; 2:00 pm, RSN/ESPN3	No. 2	Delaware	W 88–50	8–0	18 – Kelly, Plumlee	11 – Plumlee	10 – Thornton	Cameron Indoor Stadium (9,314); Durham, NC
December 8, 2012*; 3:15 pm, ESPN	No. 2	vs. Temple	W 90–67	9–0	23 – Curry	14 – Plumlee	7 – Sulaimon	Izod Center (12,157); East Rutherford, NJ
December 19, 2012*; 7:00 pm, ESPNU	No. 1	Cornell	W 88–47	10–0	20 – Curry	9 – Plumlee	12 – Cook	Cameron Indoor Stadium (9,314); Durham, NC
December 20, 2012*; 7:00 pm, ESPNU	No. 1	Elon	W 76–54	11–0	21 – Plumlee	15 – Plumlee	4 – Sulaimon, Thornton	Cameron Indoor Stadium (9,314); Durham, NC
December 29, 2012*; 12:00 pm, ESPN2	No. 1	Santa Clara	W 90–77	12–0	31 – Curry	13 – Plumlee	5 – Cook, Plumlee	Cameron Indoor Stadium (9,314); Durham, NC
January 2, 2013*; 7:00 pm, ESPN2	No. 1	at Davidson	W 67–50	13–0	18 – Kelly	7 – Kelly, Plumlee, Sulaimon	3 – Curry	Time Warner Cable Arena (13,607); Charlotte, NC
ACC regular season
January 5, 2013; 12:00 pm, ESPNU	No. 1	Wake Forest	W 80–62	14–0 (1–0)	22 – Curry, Kelly	12 – Plumlee	14 – Cook	Cameron Indoor Stadium (9,314); Durham, NC
January 8, 2013; 7:00 pm, ESPNU	No. 1	Clemson	W 68–40	15–0 (2–0)	27 – Cook	13 – Plumlee	5 – Cook, Plumlee	Cameron Indoor Stadium (9,314); Durham, NC
January 12, 2013; 12:00 pm, ESPN	No. 1	at No. 20 NC State	L 76–84	15–1 (2–1)	22 – Curry	11 – Plumlee	7 – Cook	PNC Arena (19,557); Raleigh, NC
January 17, 2013; 9:00 pm, ESPN	No. 3	Georgia Tech	W 73–57	16–1 (3–1)	24 – Curry	13 – Plumlee	5 – Cook	Cameron Indoor Stadium (9,314); Durham, NC
January 23, 2013; 7:00 pm, ESPN	No. 1	at No. 25 Miami (FL)	L 63–90	16–2 (3–2)	16 – Sulaimon	11 – Plumlee	5 – Cook	BankUnited Center (7,972); Coral Gables, FL
January 26, 2013; 1:00 pm, CBS	No. 1	Maryland	W 84–64	17–2 (4–2)	25 – Sulaimon	9 – Jefferson	9 – Cook	Cameron Indoor Stadium (9,314); Durham, NC
January 30, 2013; 8:00 pm, ACCN/ESPN3	No. 5	at Wake Forest	W 75–70	18–2 (5–2)	32 – Plumlee	9 – Plumlee	7 – Cook	LJVM Coliseum (12,603); Winston-Salem, NC
February 2, 2013; 2:00 pm, ESPN	No. 5	at Florida State	W 79–60	19–2 (6–2)	21 – Curry	5 – Plumlee, Cook	6 – Cook	Donald L. Tucker Center (12,100); Tallahassee, FL
February 7, 2013; 9:00 pm, ACCN/ESPN3	No. 4	NC State	W 98–85	20–2 (7–2)	30 – Plumlee	9 – Plumlee	6 – Thornton	Cameron Indoor Stadium (9,314); Durham, NC
February 10, 2013; 6:00 pm, ESPNU	No. 4	at Boston College	W 62–61	21–2 (8–2)	19 – Plumlee	10 – Plumlee	3 – Cook, Curry	Conte Forum (6,709); Chestnut Hill, MA
February 13, 2013; 9:00 pm, ESPN	No. 2	North Carolina 'Carolina–Duke rivalry'	W 73–68	22–2 (9–2)	18 – Plumlee, Cook	11 – Plumlee	5 – Sulaimon	Cameron Indoor Stadium (9,314); Durham, NC
February 16, 2013; 6:00 pm, ESPN	No. 2	at Maryland	L 81–83	22–3 (9–3)	25 – Curry	4 – Sulaimon	6 – Cook	Comcast Center (17,950); College Park, MD
February 21, 2013; 9:00 pm, ESPN	No. 6	at Virginia Tech	W 88–56	23–3 (10–3)	22 – Curry	12 – Plumlee	5 – Plumlee, Thornton	Cassell Coliseum (7,585); Blacksburg, VA
February 24, 2013; 2:00 pm, ACCN/ESPN3	No. 6	Boston College	W 89–68	24–3 (11–3)	27 – Sulaimon	15 – Plumlee	4 – Plumlee	Cameron Indoor Stadium (9,314); Durham, NC
February 28, 2013; 9:00 pm, ESPN	No. 3	at Virginia	L 68–73	24–4 (11–4)	28 – Curry	7 – Plumlee	2 – Cook, Sulaimon, Thornton	John Paul Jones Arena (14,593); Charlottesville, VA
March 2, 2013; 6:00 pm, ESPN	No. 3	No. 5 Miami (FL)	W 79–76	25–4 (12–4)	36 – Kelly	7 – Kelly	5 – Cook	Cameron Indoor Stadium (9,314); Durham, NC
March 5, 2013; 7:00 pm, ESPNU	No. 3	Virginia Tech	W 85–57	26–4 (13–4)	20 – Curry	9 – Kelly	5 – Kelly, Plumlee	Cameron Indoor Stadium (9,314); Durham, NC
March 9, 2013; 9:00 pm, ESPN	No. 3	at North Carolina 'College GameDay'	W 69–53	27–4 (14–4)	23 – Plumlee	13 – Plumlee	5 – Cook	Dean E. Smith Center (21,750); Chapel Hill, NC
2013 ACC Tournament
March 15, 2013; 7:00 pm, ESPN2/ACCN	No. 2	vs. Maryland; Quarterfinals	L 74–83	27–5	19 – Plumlee	7 – Plumlee	3 – Curry	Greensboro Coliseum (22,169); Greensboro, NC
2013 NCAA Tournament
March 22, 2013*; 12:15 pm, CBS	No. 6 (2 MW)	vs. (15 MW) Albany; Second round	W 73–61	28–5	26 – Curry	8 – Plumlee	11 – Cook	Wells Fargo Center (20,125); Philadelphia, PA
March 24, 2013*; 9:47 pm, TBS	No. 6 (2 MW)	vs. No. 22 (7 MW) Creighton; Third round	W 66–50	29–5	21 – Sulaimon	6 – Thornton	6 – Cook	Wells Fargo Center (20,125); Philadelphia, PA
March 29, 2013*; 9:58 pm, CBS	No. 6 (2 MW)	vs. No. 9 (3 MW) Michigan State; Sweet Sixteen	W 71–61	30–5	29 – Curry	7 – Kelly, Plumlee	2 – Cook, Kelly, Thornton	Lucas Oil Stadium (35,520); Indianapolis, IN
March 31, 2013*; 5:05 pm, CBS	No. 6 (2 MW)	vs. No. 2 (1 MW) Louisville; Elite Eight	L 63–85	30–6	17 – Plumlee	12 – Plumlee	5 – Cook	Lucas Oil Stadium (34,657); Indianapolis, IN
*Non-conference game. ^{#}Rankings from AP Poll. (#) Tournament seedings in parentheses. All times are in Eastern Time. (#) during NCAA Tournament is Seed with Region MW=Midwest.

== Rankings ==
Ranking movements Legend: ██ Increase in ranking ██ Decrease in ranking ( ) = First-place votes
	Week																			
Poll	Pre	1	2	3	4	5	6	7	8	9	10	11	12	13	14	15	16	17	18	Final
AP Poll	8	9	5	2 (18)	2 (20)	2 (20)	1 (62)	1 (63)	1 (63)	1 (62)	3 (14)	1 (39)	5	4	2 (20)	6	3	3 (5)	2 (11)	6
Coaches' Poll	8	9	5	2 (4)	2 (6)	2 (6)	1 (30)	1 (30)	1 (30)	1 (30)	3 (7)	1 (20)	5	4	1 (18)	6	3	4	2 (2)	7
