= 2012–13 Appalachian State Mountaineers men's basketball team =

American college basketball season

2012–13 Appalachian State Mountaineers men's basketball
- Conference: Southern Conference
- South Division
- Record: 15–16 (10–8 SoCon)
- Head coach: Jason Capel (3rd season)
- Assistant coaches: Bobby Kummer; Justin Gainey; Kellen Sampson
- Home arena: George M. Holmes Convocation Center

2012–13 Southern Conference men's basketball standings
	Conf.				Overall
Team	W		L	PCT	W		L	PCT
North
Elon	13	–	5	.722	21	–	12	.636
Appalachian State	10	–	8	.556	15	–	16	.484
Western Carolina	9	–	9	.500	14	–	19	.424
Samford	9	–	9	.500	11	–	21	.344
Chattanooga	8	–	10	.444	13	–	19	.406
UNC Greensboro	6	–	12	.333	9	–	22	.290
South
Davidson †	17	–	1	.944	26	–	8	.765
College of Charleston	14	–	4	.778	24	–	11	.686
Georgia Southern	7	–	11	.389	14	–	19	.424
Wofford	7	–	11	.389	13	–	19	.406
The Citadel	5	–	13	.278	8	–	22	.267
Furman	3	–	15	.167	7	–	24	.226
† SoCon Tournament winner As of March 20, 2013; Rankings from AP Poll

The 2012–13 Appalachian State Mountaineers men's basketball team represented Appalachian State University during the 2012–13 NCAA Division I men's basketball season. The Mountaineers, led by third year head coach Jason Capel, played their home games at the George M. Holmes Convocation Center and are members of the North Division of the Southern Conference. They advanced to the semifinals of the Southern Conference tournament, where they lost to Davidson.

== Roster ==
Number	Name	Position	Height	Weight	Year	Hometown
1	Tevin Baskin	Forward	6–6	210	Junior	Stamford, Connecticut
2	Tab Hamilton	Guard	6–3	180	Sophomore	Winston-Salem, North Carolina
3	Jonathan Frye	Guard	6–4	195	Freshman	Greensboro, North Carolina
4	Michael Obacha	Forward	6–8	215	Freshman	Edo State, Nigeria
10	Chris Burgess	Guard	5–8	175	Freshman	Lakeland, Florida
11	Nathan Healy	Forward	6–7	210	Senior	New Bern, North Carolina
12	Rantavious Gilbert	Forward	6–8	235	Freshman	Albany, Georgia
13	Jamaal Trice	Forward	6–6	220	Senior	Los Angeles
15	Tommy Spagnolo	Forward	6–7	210	Junior	West Jefferson, North Carolina
20	Bennett Rutherford	Guard	6–2	190	Freshman	Weddington, North Carolina
21	Frank Eaves	Guard	6–2	175	Freshman	Greensboro, North Carolina
23	Mike Neal	Guard	6–2	185	Sophomore	Greensboro, North Carolina
24	Brian Okam	Center	7–0	245	Junior	Enugu, Nigeria
32	Dustin Clarke	Guard	6–3	165	Sophomore	Newland, North Carolina
35	Jay Canty	Forward	6–6	200	Sophomore	Jamestown, North Carolina

== Schedule ==
Date time, TV	Rank^{#}	Opponent^{#}	Result	Record	Site (attendance) city, state
Regular Season
11/09/2012*; 7:30 pm		Montreat	W 86–54	1–0	George M. Holmes Convocation Center (2,201); Boone, North Carolina
11/13/2012*; 7:00 pm		High Point	L 64–86	1–1	George M. Holmes Convocation Center (1,102); Boone, North Carolina
11/16/2012*; 7:45 pm		at Campbell	L 82–101	1–2	John W. Pope, Jr. Convocation Center (2,873); Buies Creek, North Carolina
11/20/2012*; 7:00 pm		at East Carolina	L 72–82	1–3	Williams Arena at Minges Coliseum (4,014); Greenville, North Carolina
11/23/2012*; 2:00 pm, ESPN3		at Virginia Tech	L 76–87	1–4	Cassell Coliseum (7,094); Blacksburg, Virginia
11/28/2012*; 7:00 pm		Duquesne	L 72–73	1–5	George M. Holmes Convocation Center (741); Boone, North Carolina
12/01/2012*; 3:00 pm, ESPN3		at No. 16 Missouri	L 56–72	1–6	Mizzou Arena (9,388); Columbia, Missouri
12/08/2012; 4:30 pm		at Western Carolina	L 64–70	1–7 (0–1)	Ramsey Center (3,051); Collowhee, North Carolina
12/16/2012*; 2:05 pm		at UMKC	W 81–71	2–7	Swinney Recreation Center (779); Kansas City, Missouri
12/19/2012*; 5:00 pm, FS South		at South Carolina	L 69–74	2–8	Colonial Life Arena (N/A); Columbia, South Carolina
12/22/2012*; 2:00 pm		Presbyterian	W 78–70	3–8	George M. Holmes Convocation Center (878); Boone, North Carolina
12/30/2012*; 2:00 pm		Milligan	W 71–51	4–8	George M. Holmes Convocation Center (820); Boone, North Carolina
01/08/2013; 7:00 pm		at Wofford	W 50–49	5–8 (1–1)	Benjamin Johnson Arena (1,176); Spartanburg, South Carolina
01/12/2013; 4:30 pm		Elon	W 80–70	6–8 (2–1)	George M. Holmes Convocation Center (1,708); Boone, North Carolina
01/14/2013; 7:00 pm		UNC Greensboro	W 83–70	7–8 (3–1)	George M. Holmes Convocation Center (1,327); Boone, North Carolina
01/17/2013; 7:00 pm		at Chattanooga	L 88–91 ^{OT}	7–9 (3–2)	McKenzie Arena (2,787); Chattanooga, Tennessee
01/19/2013; 8:00 pm		at Samford	L 68–72	7–10 (3–3)	Pete Hanna Center (2,236); Homewood, Alabama
01/24/2013; 7:00 pm		Georgia Southern	W 64–62 ^{OT}	8–10 (4–3)	George M. Holmes Convocation Center (1,292); Boone, North Carolina
01/26/2013; 2:00 pm		Davidson	L 56–79	8–11 (4–4)	George M. Holmes Convocation Center (1,968); Boone, North Carolina
01/30/2013; 7:00 pm		at College of Charleston	L 59–72	8–12 (4–5)	TD Arena (3,530); Charleston, South Carolina
02/02/2013; 4:30 pm, ESPN3		Western Carolina	W 74–65	9–12 (5–5)	George M. Holmes Convocation Center (2,852); Boone, North Carolina
02/07/2013; 7:00 pm		at Georgia Southern	W 91–86 ^{OT}	10–12 (6–5)	Hanner Fieldhouse (1,512); Statesboro, Georgia
02/09/2013; 7:30 pm		at Davidson	L 52–87	10–13 (6–6)	John M. Belk Arena (5,090); Davidson, North Carolina
02/11/2013; 8:00 pm		Furman	W 72–66	11–13 (7–6)	George M. Holmes Convocation Center (818); Boone, North Carolina
02/14/2013; 7:00 pm		at Elon	L 58–61	11–14 (7–7)	Alumni Gym (1,533); Elon, North Carolina
02/17/2013; 2:00 pm		at UNC Greensboro	W 76–68	12–14 (8–7)	Greensboro Coliseum (4,014); Greensboro, North Carolina
02/20/2013; 8:00 pm		The Citadel	L 77–80 ^{OT}	12–15 (8–8)	George M. Holmes Convocation Center (1,822); Boone, North Carolina
02/28/2013; 7:00 pm		Samford	W 70–67 ^{2OT}	13–15 (9–8)	George M. Holmes Convocation Center (838); Boone, North Carolina
03/02/2013; 2:00 pm		Chattanooga	W 86–60	14–15 (10–8)	George M. Holmes Convocation Center (2,102); Boone, North Carolina
2013 Southern Conference men's basketball tournament
03/09/2013; 2:30 pm, ESPN3		vs. Furman; Quarterfinals	W 74–60	15–15	U.S. Cellular Center (5,313); Asheville, North Carolina
03/10/2013; 6:00 pm, ESPN3		vs. Davidson; Semifinals	L 62–65	15–16	U.S. Cellular Center; Asheville, North Carolina
*Non-conference game. ^{#}Rankings from AP Poll. (#) Tournament seedings in parentheses. All times are in Eastern Time.
