= Timmons Arena =

Arena in Greenville, South Carolina

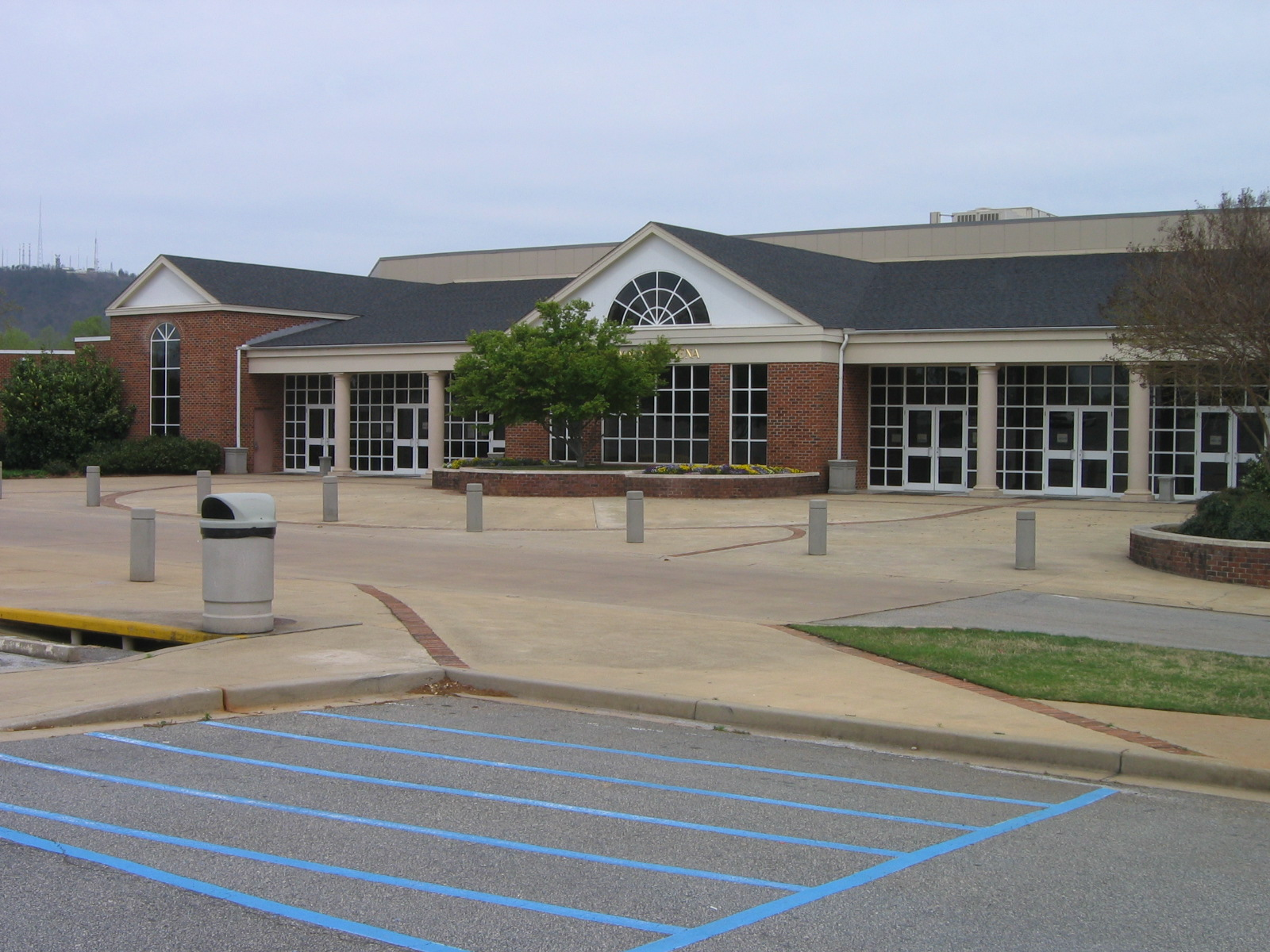
- Exterior view of the arena in 2008
- Interactive map of Timmons Arena
- Location: 3300 Poinsett Highway; Greenville, SC 29613
- Coordinates: 34.917960395415406°N 82.43731145938682°W
- Owner: Furman University
- Operator: Furman University
- Capacity: 2,750
- Surface: Hardwood

Construction
- Groundbreaking: August 24, 1996
- Opened: December 30, 1997

Tenants
- Furman Paladins (NCAA); Men's basketball (1997–present); Women's basketball (1997–present); Volleyball (1997–2004, 2026–present)

Timmons Arena is a 2,750-seat multi-purpose arena on the campus of Furman University in Greenville, South Carolina. Opened in 1997, it serves as the home venue for the Furman Paladins men's and women's basketball teams and the university's volleyball team. The arena is named after the Timmons family, which pledged a $4 million lead gift toward its construction.

== History ==
The Furman Paladins men's and women's basketball teams played their home games at Greenville Memorial Auditorium until its closure in 1996. Following the venue's closure, Furman began construction of a 100,000-square-foot arena on its campus. Groundbreaking for the new facility took place on August 24, 1996.

Timmons Arena opened on December 30, 1997, with a men's basketball game between Furman and the Northern Illinois Huskies.

In February 2024, Furman announced a $40 million renovation of Timmons Arena. Renovations began in April 2024 and were completed in August 2025. The project included a new glass facade, a redesigned seating bowl, offices, and locker rooms, among other improvements. The renovated arena hosted its first event on October 26, 2025, when Furman hosted the Alabama Crimson Tide in an exhibition game.
