= 2012–13 Fordham Rams men's basketball team =

American college basketball season

2012–13 Fordham Rams men's basketball
- Conference: Atlantic 10
- Record: 7–24 (3–13 A-10)
- Head coach: Tom Pecora
- Assistant coaches: David Duke; John Morton; Tom Parrotta
- Home arena: Rose Hill Gymnasium

2012–13 Atlantic 10 men's basketball standings
	Conf.				Overall
Team	W		L	PCT	W		L	PCT
No. 16 Saint Louis †	13	–	3	.813	28	–	7	.800
No. 25 VCU	12	–	4	.750	27	–	9	.750
Butler	11	–	5	.688	27	–	9	.750
La Salle	11	–	5	.688	24	–	10	.706
Temple	11	–	5	.688	24	–	10	.706
UMass	9	–	7	.563	21	–	12	.636
Xavier	9	–	7	.563	17	–	14	.548
Charlotte	8	–	8	.500	21	–	12	.636
Saint Joseph's	8	–	8	.500	18	–	14	.563
Richmond	8	–	8	.500	19	–	15	.559
Dayton	7	–	9	.438	17	–	14	.548
St. Bonaventure	7	–	9	.438	14	–	15	.483
George Washington	7	–	9	.438	13	–	17	.433
Rhode Island	3	–	13	.188	8	–	21	.276
Fordham	3	–	13	.188	7	–	24	.226
Duquesne	1	–	15	.063	8	–	22	.267
† 2013 Atlantic 10 Tournament winner As of March 28, 2013; Rankings from AP Poll

The 2012–13 Fordham Rams men's basketball team represented Fordham University during the 2012–13 NCAA Division I men's basketball season. The team was coached by Tom Pecora in his third year at the school. Fordham Rams home games were played at Rose Hill Gymnasium and the team was a member of the Atlantic 10 Conference. They finished the season 7–24, 3–13 in A-10 play, to finish in a tie for 14th place. They failed to qualify for the Atlantic 10 tournament.

== Roster ==
2012–13 Fordham Rams men's basketball team
Players
Coaches

Pos.	#	Name	Height	Weight	Year	Hometown
G	1	Branden Frazier	6 ft 3 in (1.91 m)	170 lb (77 kg)	Jr	Brooklyn, NY
F	2	Travion Leonard	6 ft 8 in (2.03 m)	275 lb (125 kg)	Fr	Raleigh, NC
G	3	Devon McMillan	5 ft 10 in (1.78 m)	165 lb (75 kg)	So	Brooklyn, NY
G	5	Jeffrey Short	6 ft 4 in (1.93 m)	180 lb (82 kg)	So	Bronx, NY
F	10	Luka Zivkovic	6 ft 8 in (2.03 m)	215 lb (98 kg)	So	Belgrade, SRB
G	15	Nihad Musovic	6 ft 0 in (1.83 m)	185 lb (84 kg)	Fr	Yonkers, NY
G	20	Jared Fay	6 ft 3 in (1.91 m)	170 lb (77 kg)	So	Lynn, MA
G	23	Mandell Thomas	6 ft 2 in (1.88 m)	185 lb (84 kg)	Fr	Rochester, NY
G	24	Bryan Smith	6 ft 2 in (1.88 m)	195 lb (88 kg)	So	Brooklyn, NY
F	30	Ryan Rhoomes	6 ft 8 in (2.03 m)	235 lb (107 kg)	Fr	Middletown, NY
G	32	DC Gaitley	6 ft 2 in (1.88 m)	190 lb (86 kg)	So	Haverford, PA
F	33	Chris Gaston	6 ft 7 in (2.01 m)	220 lb (100 kg)	Sr	Union City, NY
G	34	Jermaine Myers	6 ft 0 in (1.83 m)	180 lb (82 kg)	Fr	Ajax, ONT
G	35	Khalid Robinson	6 ft 3 in (1.91 m)	200 lb (91 kg)	Sr	Bronx, NY
C	42	Ryan Canty	6 ft 9 in (2.06 m)	230 lb (104 kg)	So	Danvers, MA

Head coach

- Tom Pecora (Adelphi)

Assistant coach(es)

- David Duke (Albany)
- John Morton (Seton Hall)
- Tom Parrotta (Fordham)

Legend

- (C) Team captain
- (S) Suspended
- (I) Ineligible
- (W) Walk-on
- Injured
- Current redshirt

== Schedule and results ==
Date time, TV	Opponent	Result	Record	Site (attendance) city, state
Regular season
11/09/2012*; 8:00 pm	at Texas State	L 76–86	0–1	Strahan Coliseum (2,833); San Marcos, TX
11/12/2012*; 6:00 pm, ESPN3	at Pittsburgh; NIT Season Tip-Off	L 51–86	0–2	Petersen Events Center (6,425); Pittsburgh, PA
11/13/2012*; 6:00 pm	vs. Robert Morris; NIT Season Tip-Off	L 58–74	0–3	Petersen Events Center (7,225); Pittsburgh, PA
11/19/2012*; 6:00 pm	vs. Penn; NIT Season Tip-Off Consolation game	W 70–68	1–3	Stabler Arena (540); Bethlehem, PA
11/20/2012*; 6:00 pm	vs. Fairfield; NIT Season Tip-Off Consolation game	L 71–74	1–4	Stabler Arena (486); Bethlehem, PA
11/29/2012*; 7:30 pm, YES	Manhattan; Battle of the Bronx	L 58–65	1–5	Rose Hill Gymnasium (2,680); Bronx, NY
12/01/2012*; 1:00 pm	at Harvard	L 64–73	1–6	Lavietes Pavilion (1,578); Cambridge, MA
12/04/2012*; 7:00 pm	at Lehigh	L 63–81	1–7	Stabler Arena (1,351); Bethlehem, PA
12/08/2012*; 7:00 pm, MSG	at St. John's; Rivalry	L 47–58	1–8	Madison Square Garden (10,003); New York City, NY
12/15/2012*; 2:30 pm, YES	vs. Princeton	W 63–60	2–8	Barclays Center (16,514); Brooklyn, NY
12/21/2012*; 7:00 pm, SNY/ESPN3	at Connecticut	L 73–88	2–9	Gampel Pavilion (10,265); Storrs, CT
12/23/2012*; 12:00 pm, YES	Siena	W 81–75	3–9	Rose Hill Gymnasium (2,268); Bronx, NY
12/29/2012*; 7:00 pm, ESPN3	at Georgia Tech	L 48–73	3–10	McCamish Pavilion (7,851); Atlanta, GA
12/31/2012*; 4:00 pm	Monmouth	W 82–71	4–10	Rose Hill Gymnasium (1,558); Bronx, NY
01/04/2013*; 9:00 pm, CSS/ESPN3	at Ole Miss	L 68–95	4–11	Tad Smith Coliseum (3,167); Oxford, MS
01/09/2013; 7:00 pm	Duquesne	W 82–75	5–11 (1–0)	Rose Hill Gymnasium (1,232); Bronx, NY
01/13/2013; 1:00 pm, YES	Massachusetts	L 73–77	5–12 (1–1)	Rose Hill Gymnasium (2,567); Bronx, NY
01/16/2013; 7:30 pm	at Charlotte	L 68–74	5–13 (1–2)	Halton Arena (5,275); Charlotte, NC
01/23/2013; 7:00 pm	at Dayton	L 51–96	5–14 (1–3)	UD Arena (12,131); Dayton, OH
01/26/2013; 1:00 pm, YES	Rhode Island	W 66–63	6–14 (2–3)	Rose Hill Gymnasium (3,014); Bronx, NY
01/30/2013; 7:00 pm	Saint Joseph's	L 62–66	6–15 (2–4)	Rose Hill Gymnasium (1,982); Bronx, NY
02/02/2013; 7:00 pm	at VCU	L 65–81	6–16 (2–5)	Siegel Center (7,693); Richmond, VA
02/06/2013; 8:00 pm, CBSSN	Saint Louis	L 73–90	6–17 (2–6)	Rose Hill Gymnasium (2,006); Bronx, NY
02/09/2013; 2:00 pm	at La Salle	L 53–89	6–18 (2–7)	Tom Gola Arena (2,246); Philadelphia, PA
02/13/2013; 7:00 pm, CBSSNR	at Xavier	L 66–79	6–19 (2–8)	Cintas Center (9,645); Cincinnati, OH
02/16/2013; 4:00 pm, CBSSN	No. 11 Butler	L 63–68	6–20 (2–9)	Rose Hill Gymnasium (3,200); Bronx, NY
02/20/2013; 7:00 pm, CSNMA	at George Washington	L 60–68	6–21 (2–10)	Smith Center (2,240); Washington, D.C.
02/23/2013; 1:00 pm	Richmond	L 55–72	6–22 (2–11)	Rose Hill Gymnasium (2,862); Bronx, NY
03/02/2013; 7:00 pm	at Saint Joseph's	L 56–82	6–23 (2–12)	Hagan Arena (4,076); Philadelphia, PA
03/06/2013; 7:00 pm	Temple	L 55–74	6–24 (2–13)	Rose Hill Gymnasium (1,108); Bronx, NY
03/09/2012; 4:00 pm	at St. Bonaventure	W 76–72	7–24 (3–13)	Reilly Center (4,515); St. Bonaventure, NY
*Non-conference game. ^{#}Rankings from AP Poll/Coaches' Poll. (#) Tournament seedings in parentheses. All times are in Eastern Time..
