= 2012–13 Duquesne Dukes men's basketball team =

American college basketball season

2012–13 Duquesne Dukes men's basketball
- Conference: Atlantic 10 Conference
- Record: 8–22 (1–15 A-10)
- Head coach: Jim Ferry (1st season)
- Assistant coaches: Brian Nash; John Rhodes; Rich Glesmann
- Home arena: A. J. Palumbo Center (Capacity: 4,406)

2012–13 Atlantic 10 men's basketball standings
	Conf.				Overall
Team	W		L	PCT	W		L	PCT
No. 16 Saint Louis †	13	–	3	.813	28	–	7	.800
No. 25 VCU	12	–	4	.750	27	–	9	.750
Butler	11	–	5	.688	27	–	9	.750
La Salle	11	–	5	.688	24	–	10	.706
Temple	11	–	5	.688	24	–	10	.706
UMass	9	–	7	.563	21	–	12	.636
Xavier	9	–	7	.563	17	–	14	.548
Charlotte	8	–	8	.500	21	–	12	.636
Saint Joseph's	8	–	8	.500	18	–	14	.563
Richmond	8	–	8	.500	19	–	15	.559
Dayton	7	–	9	.438	17	–	14	.548
St. Bonaventure	7	–	9	.438	14	–	15	.483
George Washington	7	–	9	.438	13	–	17	.433
Rhode Island	3	–	13	.188	8	–	21	.276
Fordham	3	–	13	.188	7	–	24	.226
Duquesne	1	–	15	.063	8	–	22	.267
† 2013 Atlantic 10 Tournament winner As of March 28, 2013; Rankings from AP Poll

The 2012–13 Duquesne Dukes men's basketball team represented Duquesne University during the 2012–13 NCAA Division I men's basketball season. The Dukes, led by first year head coach Jim Ferry, played their home games at the A. J. Palumbo Center and were members of the Atlantic 10 Conference. They finished the season 8–22, 1–15 in A-10 play to finish in last place. They failed to qualify for the Atlantic 10 tournament.

On April 10, 2012, Ferry was named the new head coach.

== Roster ==
2012–13 Duquesne Dukes men's basketball team
Players
Coaches

Pos.	#	Name	Height	Weight	Year	Hometown
F/C	0	Andre Marhold	6 ft 7 in (2.01 m)	210 lb (95 kg)	Sr	Charlotte, NC
G	1	Derrick Colter	5 ft 10 in (1.78 m)	180 lb (82 kg)	Fr	Forestville, MD
G	2	P.J. Torres	6 ft 4 in (1.93 m)	200 lb (91 kg)	So	New Rochelle, NY
G	3	Marvin Binney	6 ft 2 in (1.88 m)	185 lb (84 kg)	So	Toronto, ON
G/F	5	Jerry Jones	6 ft 5 in (1.96 m)	195 lb (88 kg)	Jr	Detroit, MI
F	21	Quevyn Winters	6 ft 5 in (1.96 m)	200 lb (91 kg)	Fr	Milwaukee, WI
F	22	Kadeem Pantophlet	6 ft 6 in (1.98 m)	205 lb (93 kg)	So	Tiel, NED
G	23	Jeremiah Jones	6 ft 3 in (1.91 m)	205 lb (93 kg)	Fr	Gary, IN
G	32	Sean Johnson	6 ft 2 in (1.88 m)	195 lb (88 kg)	Sr	Queens, NY
C	33	Martins Abele	7 ft 1 in (2.16 m)	290 lb (132 kg)	Jr	Saldus, LAT
F	34	Mamadou Datt	6 ft 8 in (2.03 m)	210 lb (95 kg)	So	Dakar, SEN
F/C	35	Derrick Martin	6 ft 9 in (2.06 m)	220 lb (100 kg)	So	Montgomery, AL
G/F	43	Sam Bott	6 ft 4 in (1.93 m)	195 lb (88 kg)	So	Gahanna, OH
F		Ovie Soko (redshirt)	6 ft 8 in (2.03 m)	220 lb (100 kg)	Sr	London, ENG

Head coach

- Jim Ferry (Keene State)

Assistant coach(es)

- Brian Nash (Keene State)
- John Rhodes (Ohio)
- Rich Glesmann (Emerson)

Legend

- (C) Team captain
- (S) Suspended
- (I) Ineligible
- (W) Walk-on
- Injured
- Current redshirt

== Schedule ==
Date time, TV	Opponent	Result	Record	High points	High rebounds	High assists	Site (attendance) city, state
Exhibition
Nov. 01*; 7:30 pm	Carnegie Mellon	W 74–38		11 – Pantophlet	7 – Marhold, Torres	3 – Jones, Torres	A. J. Palumbo Center (2,148); Pittsburgh, PA
Nov. 04*; 7:00 pm	Hawaii-Hilo	W 92–46		16 – Johnson	7 – Torres	6 – Binney	A. J. Palumbo Center (1,909); Pittsburgh, PA
Regular season
Nov. 09*; 6:30 pm	at Albany	L 66–69	0–1	17 – Colter	11 – Winters	3 – Colter	SEFCU Arena (N/A); Albany, NY
Nov. 11*; 6:30 pm, ESPNU	at Georgetown; Legends Classic Regional	L 55–61	0–2	21 – Johnson	8 – Jones, Johnson	5 – Colter	Verizon Center (8,213); Washington, D.C.
Nov. 19*; 7:00 pm	James Madison; Legends Classic Subregional	W 90–88 ^{OT}	1–2	20 – Johnson	7 – Winters	7 – Colter	A. J. Palumbo Center (2,166); Pittsburgh, PA
Nov. 20*; 7:00 pm	North Dakota State; Legends Classic Subregional	L 43–57	1–3	9 – Marhold	8 – Johnson	2 – Colter, Winters	A. J. Palumbo Center (2,060); Pittsburgh, PA
Nov. 21*; 7:00 pm	Youngstown State; Legends Classic Subregional	W 84–74	2–3	18 – Colter, Winters	10 – Abele	6 – Johnson	A. J. Palumbo Center (2,325); Pittsburgh, PA
Nov. 28*; 7:00 pm	at Appalachian State	W 73–72	3–3	22 – Jones	9 – Marhold	7 – Colter	Holmes Center (741); Boone, NC
Dec. 01*; 2:00 pm	Maine	W 87–73	4–3	15 – Jones	7 – Pantophlet	4 – Colter	A. J. Palumbo Center (2,689); Pittsburgh, PA
Dec. 05*; 7:00 pm, ESPN3	vs. Pittsburgh	L 45–66	4–4	13 – Johnson	6 – Pantophlet, Jones	5 – Torres	CONSOL Energy Center (13,089); Pittsburgh, PA
Dec. 08*; 7:00 pm	New Orleans	W 88–70	5–4	21 – Johnson	8 – Marhold, Jones	8 – Colter	A. J. Palumbo Center (2,646); Pittsburgh, PA
Dec. 11*; 7:00 pm	West Virginia	W 60–56	6–4	16 – Jones	6 – Abele, Marhold, Pantophlet	7 – Colter	CONSOL Energy Center (6,244); Pittsburgh, PA
Dec. 15*; 7:00 pm	at Robert Morris	L 69–91	6–5	16 – Colter	11 – Marhold	6 – Colter	Sewall Center (2,093); Moon Township, PA
Dec. 19*; 7:00 pm, NBCSN	Western Michigan	W 71–66	7–5	25 – Colter	8 – Marhold	4 – Jones	A. J. Palumbo Center (2,839); Pittsburgh, PA
Dec. 22*; 8:00 pm	at Louisiana–Lafayette	L 79–91	7–6	25 – Colter	8 – Pantophlet	3 – Colter	Cajundome (1,464); Lafayette, LA
Dec. 29*; 4:00 pm, ESPN3	at Penn State	L 74–84	7–7	19 – Johnson	7 – Marhold	5 – Colter	Bryce Jordan Center (5,521); University Park, PA
Jan. 09; 7:00 pm	at Fordham	L 75–82	7–8 (0–1)	17 – Colter	6 – Pantophlet	9 – Colter	Rose Hill Gymnasium (1,232); Bronx, NY
Jan. 12; 7:00 pm	Saint Joseph's	L 66–74	7–9 (0–2)	13 – Marhold, Johnson	11 – Marhold	5 – Colter	A. J. Palumbo Center (3,285); Pittsburgh, PA
Jan. 17; 7:00 pm, CBSSN	at Massachusetts	L 66–79	7–10 (0–3)	29 – Johnson	9 – Marhold	6 – Colter	Mullins Center (3,421); Amherst, MA
Jan. 19; 7:00 pm	No. 22 VCU	L 63–90	7–11 (0–4)	15 – Colter	5 – Pantophlet	4 – Colter	CONSOL Energy Center (6,278); Pittsburgh, PA
Jan. 23; 7:00 pm	Saint Louis	L 64–73	7–12 (0–5)	18 – Jones	11 – Jones	4 – Johnson, Colter	A. J. Palumbo Center (2,702); Pittsburgh, PA
Jan. 26; 4:00 pm, CBSSN Regional	at Dayton	L 56–72	7–13 (0–6)	16 – Jones, Winters	7 – Pantophlet	5 – Johnson, Colter	UD Arena (12,438); Dayton, OH
Feb. 02; 4:00 pm	at St. Bonaventure	L 60–68	7–14 (0–7)	11 – Pantophlet, Jones, Johnson	6 – Johnson	7 – Colter	Reilly Center (4,991); St. Bonaventure, NY
Feb. 06; 7:00 pm	George Washington	L 57–79	7–15 (0–8)	18 – Colter	5 – Winters	6 – Colter	A. J. Palumbo Center (2,960); Pittsburgh, PA
Feb. 09; 7:00 pm, CBSSN Regional	Xavier	L 65–73	7–16 (0–9)	19 – Winters	10 – Marhold	4 – Winters	CONSOL Energy Center (6,511); Pittsburgh, PA
Feb. 14; 7:00 pm	at Temple	W 84–83	8–16 (1–9)	22 – Winters	15 – Marhold	6 – Colter	Liacouras Center (4,871); Philadelphia, PA
Feb. 16; 7:00 pm	Rhode Island	L 62–67	8–17 (1–10)	20 – Colter	7 – Winters	7 – Colter	A. J. Palumbo Center (2,632); Pittsburgh, PA
Feb. 19; 7:00 pm	at No. 15 Butler	L 49–68	8–18 (1–11)	11 – Colter	5 – Jones	3 – Johnson	Hinkle Fieldhouse (7,193); Indianapolis, IN
Feb. 23; 7:00 pm	St. Bonaventure	L 71–78	8–19 (1–12)	18 – Winters	7 – Winters	9 – Colter	A. J. Palumbo Center (3,329); Pittsburgh, PA
Mar. 02; 2:00 pm	at La Salle	L 64–97	8–20 (1–13)	16 – Colter	6 – Jones	5 – Colter	Tom Gola Arena (3,015); Philadelphia, PA
Mar. 06; 7:00 pm	Charlotte	L 87–89 ^{OT}	8–21 (1–14)	21 – Colter	7 – Jones	11 – Colter	A. J. Palumbo Center (2,339); Pittsburgh, PA
Mar. 09; 6:00 pm	at Richmond	L 55–79	8–22 (1–15)	18 – Colter	7 – Marhold	2 – Marhold, Pantophlet	Robins Center (6,951); Richmond, VA
*Non-conference game. ^{#}Rankings from AP Poll/Coaches' Poll. (#) Tournament seedings in parentheses. All times are in Eastern Time..
