= 2012–13 Saint Joseph's Hawks men's basketball team =

American college basketball season

2012–13 Saint Joseph's Hawks men's basketball
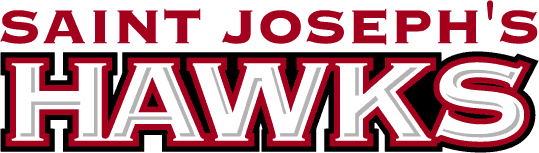

NIT, First Round
- Conference: Atlantic 10 Conference
- Record: 18–14 (8–8 A-10)
- Head coach: Phil Martelli (18th season)
- Assistant coaches: Mark Bass; David Duda; Geoff Arnold
- Home arena: Hagan Arena

2012–13 Atlantic 10 men's basketball standings
	Conf.				Overall
Team	W		L	PCT	W		L	PCT
No. 16 Saint Louis †	13	–	3	.813	28	–	7	.800
No. 25 VCU	12	–	4	.750	27	–	9	.750
Butler	11	–	5	.688	27	–	9	.750
La Salle	11	–	5	.688	24	–	10	.706
Temple	11	–	5	.688	24	–	10	.706
UMass	9	–	7	.563	21	–	12	.636
Xavier	9	–	7	.563	17	–	14	.548
Charlotte	8	–	8	.500	21	–	12	.636
Saint Joseph's	8	–	8	.500	18	–	14	.563
Richmond	8	–	8	.500	19	–	15	.559
Dayton	7	–	9	.438	17	–	14	.548
St. Bonaventure	7	–	9	.438	14	–	15	.483
George Washington	7	–	9	.438	13	–	17	.433
Rhode Island	3	–	13	.188	8	–	21	.276
Fordham	3	–	13	.188	7	–	24	.226
Duquesne	1	–	15	.063	8	–	22	.267
† 2013 Atlantic 10 Tournament winner As of March 28, 2013; Rankings from AP Poll

The 2012–13 Saint Joseph's Hawks basketball team represented Saint Joseph's University during the 2012–13 NCAA Division I men's basketball season. The Hawks, led by 18th year head coach Phil Martelli, played their home games at Hagan Arena and were members of the Atlantic 10 Conference. They finished the season 18–14, 8–8 in A-10 play to finish in a three-way tie for the eighth place. They lost in the quarterfinals of the Atlantic 10 tournament to VCU. They were invited to the 2013 NIT where they lost in the first round to St. John's.

== Roster ==
Number	Name	Position	Height	Weight	Year	Hometown
0	Evan Maschmeyer	Guard	6–3	200	Sophomore	Jeffersonville, Indiana
1	C. J. Aiken	Forward	6–9	201	Junior	Conshohocken, Pennsylvania
5	Christopher Coyne	Guard	6–2	180	Senior	Brooklyn, New York
10	Langston Galloway	Guard	6–2	200	Junior	Baton Rouge, Louisiana
11	Daryus Quarles	Guard/Forward	6–6	180	Junior	Paulsboro, New Jersey
12	Kyle Molock	Guard	6–2	190	Freshman	Dublin, Ohio
13	Ronald Roberts Jr.	Forward	6–8	220	Junior	Bayonne, New Jersey
15	Isaiah Miles	Forward	6–7	228	Freshman	Baltimore, Maryland
21	Halil Kanacević	Forward	6–8	256	Junior	Staten Island, New York
22	Taylor Trevisan	Guard	6–4	204	Senior	West Chester, Pennsylvania
24	Chris Wilson	Guard	6–3	210	Sophomore	Fayetteville, North Carolina
25	Eric Kindler	Forward	6–5	220	Sophomore	Mechanicsburg, Pennsylvania
32	Papa Ndao	Forward	6–8	223	Sophomore	Dakar, Senegal
34	Javon Baumann	Center	6–8	254	Freshman	Solms-Oberbiel, Germany
35	Carl Jones	Guard	5–11	160	Senior	Garfield Heights, Ohio
41	Colin Kelly	Forward	6–5	210	Junior	West Deptford Township, New Jersey

== Schedule ==
Date time, TV	Opponent	Result	Record	Site (attendance) city, state
Exhibition
11/08/2012*; 7:00 pm	Wheeling Jesuit	W 71–50		Hagan Arena (2,251); Philadelphia, PA
Regular season
11/12/2012*; 7:00 pm	Yale; Coaches vs Cancer Classic	W 61–35	1–0	Hagan Arena (4,120); Philadelphia, PA
11/16/2012*; 9:00 pm, TruTV	vs. No. 20 Notre Dame; Coaches vs Cancer Classic semifinals	W 79–70 ^{OT}	2–0	Barclays Center (6,433); Brooklyn, NY
11/17/2012*; 9:30 pm, TruTV	vs. Florida State; Coaches vs Cancer Classic championship	L 66–73	2–1	Barclays Center (5,502); Brooklyn, NY
11/20/2012*; 7:30 pm, NBCSN	Harvard	W 75–56	3–1	Hagan Arena (3,841); Philadelphia, PA
11/28/2012*; 7:00 pm	American	W 74–55	4–1	Hagan Arena (3,951); Philadelphia, PA
12/01/2012*; 3:00 pm, ESPN3	at No. 11 Creighton	L 51–80	4–2	CenturyLink Center Omaha (17,390); Omaha, NE
12/04/2012*; 7:30 pm	at Coppin State	W 67–55	5–2	Coppin Center (1,223); Baltimore, MD
12/11/2012*; 7:00 pm, ESPNU	at Villanova	L 61–65	5–3	The Pavilion (6,500); Philadelphia, PA
12/22/2012*; 2:00 pm	Fairfield	L 57–60	5–4	Hagan Arena (4,071); Philadelphia, PA
12/28/2012*; 7:00 pm	Iona	W 96–91	6–4	Hagan Arena (4,200); Philadelphia, PA
12/31/2012*; 4:00 pm	at Drexel	W 63–49	7–4	Daskalakis Athletic Center (2,532); Philadelphia, PA
01/05/2013*; 4:00 pm	at Morgan State	W 70–60	8–4	Talmadge L. Hill Field House (856); Baltimore, MD
01/09/2013; 7:00 pm	No. 14 Butler	L 66–72	8–5 (0–1)	Hagan Arena (4,200); Philadelphia, PA
01/12/2013; 7:00 pm	at Duquesne	W 74–66	9–5 (1–1)	A. J. Palumbo Center (3,285); Pittsburgh, PA
01/17/2013; 9:00 pm, CBSSN	at No. 22 VCU	L 86–92 ^{OT}	9–6 (1–2)	Stuart C. Siegel Center (7,693); Richmond, VA
01/19/2013*; 5:00 pm, ESPNU	vs. Penn	W 79–59	10–6	The Palestra (8,722); Philadelphia, PA
01/23/2013; 7:00 pm	St. Bonaventure	L 64–73	10–7 (1–3)	The Palestra (4,051); Philadelphia, PA
01/26/2013; 6:00 pm, CBSSN	Xavier	W 59–49	11–7 (2–3)	Hagan Arena (4,200); Philadelphia, PA
01/30/2013; 7:00 pm	Fordham	W 66–62	12–7 (3–3)	Rose Hill Gymnasium (1,982); Bronx, NY
02/02/2013; 6:00 pm, CBSSN	Temple	W 70–69	13–7 (4–3)	Hagan Arena (4,200); Philadelphia, PA
02/06/2013; 7:00 pm, Comcast Network	at Dayton	L 54–60	13–8 (4–4)	UD Arena (12,453); Dayton, OH
02/09/2013; 7:00 pm, ESPN3	at Massachusetts	L 62–80	13–9 (4–5)	William D. Mullins Memorial Center (4,479); Amherst, MA
02/13/2013; 7:00 pm	Richmond	W 61–55	14–9 (5–5)	Hagan Arena (3,651); Philadelphia, PA
02/16/2013; 1:00 pm, NBCSN	La Salle	L 64–76	14–10 (5–6)	Tom Gola Arena (8,722); Philadelphia, PA
02/23/2013; 4:00 pm, Comcast Network	George Washington	W 71–59	15–10 (6–6)	Hagan Arena (4,200); Philadelphia, PA
02/27/2013; 8:00 pm, CBSSN	No. 18 Saint Louis	L 53–70	15–11 (6–7)	Chaifetz Arena (10,012); Saint Louis, MO
03/02/2013; 7:00 pm	Fordham	W 82–56	16–11 (7–7)	Hagan Arena (4,076); Philadelphia, PA
03/06/2013; 7:00 pm	Rhode Island	W 81–44	17–11 (8–7)	Hagan Arena (3,743); Philadelphia, PA
03/09/2013; 7:00 pm	at Charlotte	L 40–52	17–12 (8–8)	Dale F. Halton Arena (4,713); Charlotte, NC
2013 Atlantic 10 tournament
03/14/2013; 6:30 pm, NBCSN	vs. Xavier; First Round	W 58–57	18–12	Barclays Center (5,751); Brooklyn, NY
03/15/2013; 6:30 pm, CSN	vs. No. 25 VCU; Quarterfinals	L 79–82	18–13	Barclays Center (7,384); Brooklyn, NY
2013 NIT
03/19/2013*; 7:00 pm, ESPNU	St. John's; First Round	L 61–63	18–14	Hagan Arena (3,148); Philadelphia, PA
*Non-conference game. ^{#}Rankings from AP Poll. (#) Tournament seedings in parentheses. All times are in Eastern Time..
