= 2012–13 Temple Owls men's basketball team =

American college basketball season

2012–13 Temple Owls men's basketball

Philadelphia Big 5 co-champions

NCAA Tournament, round of 32
- Conference: Atlantic 10 Conference
- Record: 24–10 (11–5 A-10)
- Head coach: Fran Dunphy (7th season)
- Assistant coaches: Dave Duke; Dwayne Killings; Shawn Trice
- Home arena: Liacouras Center

2012–13 Atlantic 10 men's basketball standings
	Conf.				Overall
Team	W		L	PCT	W		L	PCT
No. 16 Saint Louis †	13	–	3	.813	28	–	7	.800
No. 25 VCU	12	–	4	.750	27	–	9	.750
Butler	11	–	5	.688	27	–	9	.750
La Salle	11	–	5	.688	24	–	10	.706
Temple	11	–	5	.688	24	–	10	.706
UMass	9	–	7	.563	21	–	12	.636
Xavier	9	–	7	.563	17	–	14	.548
Charlotte	8	–	8	.500	21	–	12	.636
Saint Joseph's	8	–	8	.500	18	–	14	.563
Richmond	8	–	8	.500	19	–	15	.559
Dayton	7	–	9	.438	17	–	14	.548
St. Bonaventure	7	–	9	.438	14	–	15	.483
George Washington	7	–	9	.438	13	–	17	.433
Rhode Island	3	–	13	.188	8	–	21	.276
Fordham	3	–	13	.188	7	–	24	.226
Duquesne	1	–	15	.063	8	–	22	.267
† 2013 Atlantic 10 Tournament winner As of March 28, 2013; Rankings from AP Poll

The 2012–13 Temple Owls basketball team represented Temple University during the 2012–13 NCAA Division I men's basketball season. The Owls, led by seventh year head coach Fran Dunphy, played their home games at the Liacouras Center and were members of the Atlantic 10 Conference. They finished the season 24–10, 11–5 in A-10 play to finish in a three way tie for third place. They lost in the quarterfinals of the Atlantic 10 tournament to Massachusetts. They received an at-large bid to the 2013 NCAA tournament where they defeated North Carolina State in the second round before losing in the third round to Indiana.

This was their last season as a member of the Atlantic 10 as they will join the American Athletic Conference in July 2013. With a win over Bowling Green on December 31, 2012, the Owls became only the 6th team in NCAA history to record 1,800 wins.

== Roster ==
Number	Name	Position	Height	Weight	Year	Hometown
1	Khalif Wyatt	Guard	6–4	210	Senior	Norristown, Pennsylvania
2	Will Cummings	Guard	6–2	175	Sophomore	Jacksonville, Florida
3	Anthony Lee	Forward	6–9	230	Sophomore	Columbia, Maryland
11	T. J. DiLeo	Guard	6–3	210	Graduate	Cinnaminson Township, New Jersey
13	Nick Pendergast	Forward	6–5	180	Sophomore	Bridgewater, Connecticut
15	Jimmy McDonnell	Forward	6–10	210	Sophomore	Jackson, New Jersey
21	Dalton Pepper	Guard	6–5	220	Junior	Levittown, Pennsylvania
22	Jake O'Brien	Forward	6–9	220	Graduate	Weymouth, Massachusetts
25	Quenton DeCosey	Guard	6–5	180	Freshman	Union, New Jersey
32	Rahlir Hollis-Jefferson	Forward	6–6	215	Senior	Chester, Pennsylvania
33	Scootie Randall	Guard/forward	6–6	225	Senior	Philadelphia, Pennsylvania
41	Devontae Watson	Forward/center	6–10	210	Freshman	Ambridge, Pennsylvania
42	Daniel Dingle	Guard/forward	6–6	225	Freshman	Bronx, New York

== Schedule ==
Date time, TV	Rank^{#}	Opponent^{#}	Result	Record	Site (attendance) city, state
Regular season
November 13, 2012*; 12:00 pm, ESPN		at Kent State; ESPN College Hoops Tip-Off Marathon	W 80–66	1–0	Memorial Athletic and Convocation Center (2,415); Kent, OH
November 17, 2012*; 8:00 pm		Rice	W 77–63	2–0	Liacouras Center (6,836); Philadelphia, PA
November 25, 2012*; 2:00 pm		Delaware	W 80–75	3–0	Liacouras Center (5,158); Philadelphia, PA
November 28, 2012*; 7:00 pm		at Buffalo	W 54–39	4–0	Alumni Arena (3,201); Amherst, NY
December 1, 2012*; 2:00 pm		Wagner	W 70–62	5–0	Liacouras Center (5,371); Philadelphia, PA
December 5, 2012*; 9:00 pm, ESPN2		at Villanova	W 76–61	6–0	The Pavilion (6,500); Philadelphia, PA
December 8, 2012*; 9:00 pm, ESPN		vs. No. 2 Duke	L 67–90	6–1	Izod Center (12,157); East Rutherford, NJ
December 12, 2012*; 7:00 pm		Towson	W 72–61	7–1	Liacouras Center (4,625); Philadelphia, PA
December 17, 2012*; 7:00 pm		Alcorn State; Gotham Classic	W 63–46	8–1	Liacouras Center (3,435); Philadelphia, PA
December 19, 2012*; 7:00 pm		Canisius; Gotham Classic	L 62–72	8–2	Liacouras Center (3,258); Philadelphia, PA
December 22, 2012*; 12:00 pm, ESPN2		vs. No. 3 Syracuse; Gotham Classic	W 83–79	9–2	Madison Square Garden (12,648); New York, NY
December 28, 2012*; 3:00 pm		Detroit; Gotham Classic			Liacouras Center; Philadelphia, PA
December 31, 2012*; 2:00 pm		Bowling Green	W 75–57	10–2	Liacouras Center (4,055); Philadelphia, PA
January 6, 2013*; 4:30 pm, CBS		at No. 6 Kansas	L 62–69	10–3	Allen Fieldhouse (16,300); Lawrence, Kansas
January 10, 2013; 7:00 pm, CBSSR		at Xavier	L 52–57	10–4 (0–1)	Cintas Center (9,836); Cincinnati, OH
January 12, 2013; 6:00 pm, ESPNU		Saint Louis	W 64–54	11–4 (1–1)	Liacouras Center (5,735); Philadelphia, PA
January 16, 2013; 7:00 pm		at George Washington	W 55–53	12–4 (2–1)	Smith Center (2,430); Washington, DC
January 19, 2013; 1:00 pm, CBSSN		St. Bonaventure	L 78–81	12–5 (2–2)	Liacouras Center (6,607); Philadelphia, PA
January 23, 2013*; 7:00 pm		Penn	W 76–69	13–5	Liacouras Center (6,731); Philadelphia, PA
January 26, 2013; 6:00 pm, ESPN2		at No. 9 Butler	L 71–83	13–6 (2–3)	Hinkle Fieldhouse (10,000); Indianapolis, IN
January 30, 2013; 7:00 pm		Richmond	W 71–64	14–6 (3–3)	Liacouras Center (4,769); Philadelphia, PA
February 2, 2013; 6:00 pm, CBSSN		at Saint Joseph's	L 69–70	14–7 (3–4)	Hagan Arena (4,200); Philadelphia, PA
February 6, 2013; 7:00 pm		Charlotte	W 89–88	15–7 (4–4)	Liacouras Center (4,785); Philadelphia, PA
February 9, 2013; 11:00 am, ESPNU		at Dayton	W 72–71	16–7 (5–4)	UD Arena (12,871); Dayton, OH
February 14, 2013; 7:00 pm		Duquesne	L 83–84	16–8 (5–5)	Liacouras Center (4,871); Philadelphia, PA
February 16, 2013; 6:00 pm, CBSSN		at Massachusetts	W 83–82	17–8 (6–5)	William D. Mullins Memorial Center (7,438); Amherst, MA
February 21, 2013; 7:00 pm, CBSSN		La Salle	W 82–74	18–8 (7–5)	Liacouras Center (10,206); Philadelphia, PA
February 24, 2013; 4:00 pm		at Charlotte	W 71–51	19–8 (8–5)	Halton Arena (6,772); Charlotte, NC
February 28, 2013*; 7:00 pm, ESPN3		Detroit; Gotham Classic	W 83–78	20–8	Liacouras Center (4,452); Philadelphia, PA
March 2, 2013; 2:00 pm		Rhode Island	W 76–70	21–8 (9–5)	Liacouras Center (9,493); Philadelphia, PA
March 6, 2013; 7:00 pm		at Fordham	W 74–55	22–8 (10–5)	Rose Hill Gymnasium (1,108); Bronx, NY
March 10, 2013; 12:00 pm, CBS		No. 21 VCU	W 84–76	23–8 (11–5)	Liacouras Center (10,206); Philadelphia, PA
2013 Atlantic 10 men's basketball tournament
March 15, 2013; 9:25 pm		vs. Massachusetts; Quarterfinals	L 74–79	23–9	Barclays Center (7,384); Brooklyn, NY
2013 NCAA tournament
March 22, 2013*; 1:40 pm, TBS	No. (9 E)	vs. (8 E) NC State; Second Round	W 76–72	24–9	UD Arena (12,353); Dayton, OH
March 24, 2013*; 3:06 pm, CBS	No. (9 E)	vs. No. 4 (1 E) Indiana; Third Round	L 52–58	24–10	UD Arena (12,495); Dayton, OH
*Non-conference game. ^{#}Rankings from AP Poll. (#) Tournament seedings in parentheses. All times are in Eastern Time. (#) during NCAA Tournament is Seed with Region E=East.
