= 2012–13 Atlantic 10 Conference men's basketball season =

- League: NCAA Division I
- Sport: Basketball
- Teams: 16
- TV partner: CBS College Sports Network

Tournament

Atlantic 10 men's basketball seasons
- 11–12 13–14

2012–13 Atlantic 10 men's basketball standings
	Conf.				Overall
Team	W		L	PCT	W		L	PCT
No. 16 Saint Louis †	13	–	3	.813	28	–	7	.800
No. 25 VCU	12	–	4	.750	27	–	9	.750
Butler	11	–	5	.688	27	–	9	.750
La Salle	11	–	5	.688	24	–	10	.706
Temple	11	–	5	.688	24	–	10	.706
UMass	9	–	7	.563	21	–	12	.636
Xavier	9	–	7	.563	17	–	14	.548
Charlotte	8	–	8	.500	21	–	12	.636
Saint Joseph's	8	–	8	.500	18	–	14	.563
Richmond	8	–	8	.500	19	–	15	.559
Dayton	7	–	9	.438	17	–	14	.548
St. Bonaventure	7	–	9	.438	14	–	15	.483
George Washington	7	–	9	.438	13	–	17	.433
Rhode Island	3	–	13	.188	8	–	21	.276
Fordham	3	–	13	.188	7	–	24	.226
Duquesne	1	–	15	.063	8	–	22	.267
† 2013 Atlantic 10 Tournament winner As of March 28, 2013; Rankings from AP Poll

The 2012–13 Atlantic 10 Conference men's basketball season marked the 37th season of Atlantic 10 Conference basketball. The season marked the first for new members Butler and VCU, and the last for departing members Temple and Charlotte. The 2013 Atlantic 10 men's basketball tournament was held for the first time at Barclays Center in Brooklyn, New York.

== Preseason ==
Prior to the season, the Atlantic 10 welcomed new members, Butler and VCU. The two schools joined the conference immediately, rather than waiting a season as Butler initially intended, because they "weren't going to be allowed to play in the respective conference tournaments." With the addition of these programs, the conference sits at 16 teams for one year, yet the conference slate stayed at 16 games. "The league had to be creative with its schedule knowing that it would be for only one season. Every team will play each team once with one rivalry game twice."

The conference moved the conference tournament to the Barclays Center in Brooklyn, New York, after six seasons in Atlantic City. Analysts predict "the league's Big Apple debut might result in a record number of bids for this stacked conference." The contract lasts for five years. "I just think it's going to be a rebirth of college basketball in New York," said Fordham coach Tom Pecora, who was born in the borough.

For the 2012–13 season, Butler lost Ronald Nored to graduation and Chrishawn Hopkins to a violation of team rules, but returned nearly every other significant player and added key players in transfer Rotnei Clarke and freshman Kellen Dunham.

Charlotte's Chris Braswell "might be the best big man in the league, and the 49ers have a good recruiting class entering the fold." Dayton's frontcourt garnered press for its depth, with Kevin Dillard returning as point guard, along with transfers Vee Sanford and Matt Derenbecker.

"Va. Tech transfer Tyrone Garland joins a loaded perimeter group" at La Salle, and Massachusetts "could be a title threat" with point guard Chaz Williams, who returned along with three other starters following a run to the NIT semifinals.

2012 A10 tournament champion Saint Bonaventure faced potential struggle after the loss of Andrew Nicholson, who "was a dominant force throughout his career." However, the Bonnies returned Marquise Simmons and Michael Davenport from injuries. Saint Joseph's returned everyone "from a team that was in the mix for an NCAA bid until late."

Saint Louis was the favorite among many analysts because, although it lost Brian Conklin, the team returned Kwamain Mitchell and "locks down on D." The Billikens are without coach Rick Majerus, who "is taking a leave of absence for health reasons." Majerus died on December 1, 2012, prompting Commissioner Bernadette McGlade's statement, "The entire Atlantic 10 family is grieving tonight over the loss of coach Majerus. His undeniable knowledge and love of the game was known to all, and he was an excellent teacher committed to the student-athlete. This passion made his impact on A-10 basketball over the past five years immeasurable. He will be missed at Saint Louis, within the A-10 and nationally; our prayers and condolences are with coach Majerus’ family and the Saint Louis University community."

Perpetual favorites Temple and Xavier both lost "key weapons" but neither were expected to have a "huge drop" as Temple's "Scootie Randall will be healthy [and] Khalif Wyatt is back" and Xavier adds Semaj Christon and Isaiah Philmore. However, Xavier lost all of its starters and half of its "highly regarded recruiting class (Myles Davis and Jalen Reynolds) to academic issues."

CBS analyst Jeff Borzello noted that "It will be interesting to see how VCU adjusts in its first year. With that said, the Rams return many of their weapons from last season." However, the rams do not have freshmen recruits Mo Alie-Cox and Jordan Burgess, who "is considered a top 100 recruit," as the school announced they were only partial qualifiers by the NCAA and thus were not eligible to compete until at least the 2013–14 season.

=== Atlantic 10 preseason poll ===
Rank	Team	Votes (First place)
1	Saint Joseph's	434 (11)
2	Saint Louis	432 (10)
3	VCU	410 (3)
4	Temple	394 (2)
5	Massachusetts	389 (2)
6	Butler	347 (2)
7	La Salle	281
8	Dayton	264
9	Xavier	239
10	Richmond	235
11	St. Bonaventure	170
12	Charlotte	145
13	Geo. Washington	112
14	Fordham	84
15	Rhode Island	76
16	Duquesne	68

=== Atlantic 10 preseason teams ===
Award	Recipients
First Team	Kevin Dillard (Dayton); Chris Gaston (Fordham); Chaz Williams (Massachusetts); Kwamain Mitchell (Saint Louis); Khalif Wyatt (Temple)
Second Team	Rotnei Clarke (Butler); Chris Braswell (Charlotte); Ramon Galloway (La Salle); Langston Galloway (Saint Joseh's); Carl Jones (Saint Joseph's)
Third Team	Darien Brothers (Richmond); C. J. Aiken (Saint Joseph's); Halil Kanačević (Saint Joseph's); Scootie Randall (Temple); Juvonte Reddic (VCU)
Defensive Team	Roosevelt Jones (Butler); Pierriá Henry (Charlotte); C. J. Aiken (Saint Joseph's); Jordair Jett (Saint Louis); Brianté Weber (VCU)
Rookie Team	Kellen Dunham (Butler); Jordan Hare (Rhode Island); Daniel Dingle (Temple); Melvin Johnson (VCU); Semaj Christon (Xavier)

=== Conference Previews ===
Several media outlets projected the final Atlantic 10 Conference standings for the 2012–13 season:

Rank	CBS Sports	Rivals	Blue Ribbon	Sporting News	Lindy's	Athlon	College Hoops Insider	ESPN The Magazine	College Sports Madness
1.			Saint Louis		Saint Louis	VCU		Saint Louis	Saint Louis
2.			VCU		Butler	Saint Louis		Butler	VCU
3.			St. Joseph's		Temple	Temple		St. Joseph's	Xavier
4.			Temple		VCU	Massachusetts		Temple	St. Joseph's
5.			Massachusetts		St. Joseph's	Butler		VCU	Massachusetts
6.			Butler		Xavier	St. Joseph's		Massachusetts	Butler
7.			Dayton		Massachusetts	St. Bonaventure		Richmond	Temple
8.			La Salle		Richmond	Xavier		Dayton	La Salle
9.			Richmond		Dayton	La Salle		Xavier	Dayton
10.			Xavier		La Salle	Dayton		La Salle	St. Bonaventure
11.			St. Bonaventure		Geo. Washington	Richmond		St. Bonaventure	Geo. Washington
12.			Charlotte		St. Bonaventure	Charlotte		George Washington	-
13.			Rhode Island		Charlotte	Fordham		Duquesne	-
14.			Geo. Washington		Rhode Island	Geo. Washington		Fordham	-
15.			Fordham		Fordham	Rhode Island		Charlotte	-
16.			Duquesne		Duquesne	Duquesne		Rhode Island	-

=== Preseason watchlists ===
	Wooden	Naismith
Rotnei Clarke (Butler)		✓

== Regular season ==
=== Rankings ===
Legend
	Improvement in ranking
	Drop in ranking
	No change in ranking
RV	Received votes but were not ranked in Top 25 of poll

		Pre	Wk 1	Wk 2	Wk 3	Wk 4	Wk 5	Wk 6	Wk 7	Wk 8	Wk 9	Wk 10	Wk 11	Wk 12	Wk 13	Wk 14	Wk 15	Wk 16	Wk 17	Wk 18	Final
Butler	AP	RV	RV		RV	RV	RV	19	18	17	14	13	9	9	14	11	11	15	20		
Butler	C	RV			RV	RV	RV	25	21	20	17	13	9	10	14	10	10	15	21		
Charlotte	AP																				
Charlotte	C																				
Dayton	AP																				
Dayton	C																				
Duquesne	AP																				
Duquesne	C																				
Fordham	AP																				
Fordham	C																				
George Washington	AP																				
George Washington	C																				
La Salle	AP													RV							
La Salle	C													RV							
Massachusetts	AP																				
Massachusetts	C																				
Rhode Island	AP																				
Rhode Island	C																				
Richmond	AP																				
Richmond	C																				
St. Bonaventure	AP																				
St. Bonaventure	C																				
Saint Joseph's	AP	RV	RV	RV	RV																
Saint Joseph's	C	RV	RV	RV	RV																
Saint Louis	AP	RV	RV												RV	RV		RV	18		
Saint Louis	C	RV	RV												RV	RV		RV	19		
Temple	AP				RV	RV			RV	RV	RV	RV									
Temple	C								RV	RV	RV										
VCU	AP	RV	RV		RV		RV	RV	RV	RV	RV	22	19	RV	RV	RV	RV	24	RV		
VCU	C	RV	RV	RV	RV	RV	RV	RV	RV	RV	24	19	16	RV	RV	RV	RV	24	25		
Xavier	AP			RV																	
Xavier	C																				

=== A-10 vs. other conferences ===
Conference	Wins	Losses	%
Am. East	4	1	-
ACC	3	5	-
A-Sun	3	0	-
Big 12	0	1	-
Big East	4	4	-
Big Sky	0	1	-
Big South	3	0	-
Big Ten	1	3	-
Big West	0	1	-
Colonial	8	1	-
C-USA	3	0	-
Great West	0	0	-
Horizon League	3	1	-
Independents	0	0	-
Ivy League	5	1	-
MAAC	5	4	-
MAC	5	2	-
MEAC	3	0	-
MVC	2	2	-
MWC	0	0	-
NEC	3	3	-
OVC	1	0	-
Pac-12	0	1	-
Patriot	1	0	-
SEC	3	2	-
SoCon	4	0	-
Southland	1	0	-
SWAC	0	0	-
Summit	0	1	-
Sun Belt	1	0	-
WCC	0	1	-
WAC	1	1	-
Total	67	36	.651

As of 12/3/2012

=== Weekly honors ===
Throughout the conference regular season, the Atlantic 10 offices name a player of the week and rookie of the week each Monday.

Week	Player of the week	Rookie of the week
November 12, 2012	Dee Davis, Xavier	Kellen Dunham, Butler
November 19, 2012	Ronald Roberts, Saint Joseph's	Dyshawn Pierre, Dayton; Joe McDonald, George Washington
November 26, 2012	Rotnei Clarke, Butler	Semaj Christon, Xavier
December 3, 2012	Derrick Williams, Richmond	Semaj Christon, Xavier (2)
December 10, 2012	Kevin Dillard, Dayton; Tyreek Duren, La Salle	Kellen Dunham, Butler (2)
December 17, 2012	Roosevelt Jones, Butler	Derrick Colter, Duquesne
December 24, 2012	Khalif Wyatt, Temple	Derrick Colter, Duquesne (2)
December 31, 2012	Carl Jones, Saint Joseph's	Kellen Dunham, Butler (3); Quevyn Winters, Duquesne
January 7, 2013	Troy Daniels, VCU	Willie Clayton, Charlotte
January 14, 2013	Andrew Smith, Butler	Semaj Christon, Xavier (3)
January 21, 2013	Roosevelt Jones, Butler (2); Treveon Graham, VCU	Semaj Christon, Xavier (4)
January 28, 2013	Ramon Galloway, La Salle	Kellen Dunham, Butler (4)
February 4, 2013	Khalif Wyatt, Temple (2); Juvonte Reddic, VCU	Mandell Thomas, Fordham
February 11, 2013	Khalif Wyatt, Temple (3)	Semaj Christon, Xavier (5)
February 18, 2013		
February 25, 2013		
March 3, 2013		

Butler's Roosevelt Jones was named the Oscar Robertson National Player of the Week on January 21, 2013.

== Postseason ==
=== Atlantic 10 All-Conference teams ===
Award	Recipients
Coach of the Year	Jim Crews (St. Louis)
Player of the Year	Khalif Wyatt (Temple)
Defensive Player of the Year	Brianté Weber (VCU)
Rookie of the Year	Semaj Christon (Xavier)
Sixth Man of the Year	Cody Ellis (St. Louis)
Chris Daniels Most Improved Player of the Year	Travis Taylor (Xavier)
All-Academic Team	Andrew Smith (Butler); Dwayne Evans (St. Louis); Nemanja Mikic (George Washington); T. J. DiLeo (Temple); Nikola Malesevic (Rhode Island)
First Team	Khalif Wyatt (Temple); Ramon Galloway (La Salle); Rotnei Clarke (Butler); Dwayne Evans (St. Louis); Chaz Williams (Massachusetts)
Second Team	Juvonte Reddic (VCU); Treveon Graham (VCU); Semaj Christon (Xavier); Tyreek Duren (La Salle); Kevin Dillard (Dayton)
Third Team	Darien Brothers (Richmond); Ronald Roberts (St. Joseph's); Kwamain Mitchell (St. Louis); Jordair Jett (St. Louis); Travis Taylor (Xavier)
Honorable Mention	
All-Defensive Team	Brianté Weber (VCU); Jordair Jett (St. Louis); Pierriá Henry (Charlotte); Roosevelt Jones (Butler); Darius Theus (VCU)
All-Rookie Team	Semaj Christon (Xavier); Kellen Dunham (Butler); Derrick Colter (Duquesne); Willie Clayton (Charlotte); Melvin Johnson (VCU)
