= 2012–13 Charlotte 49ers men's basketball team =

American college basketball season

2012–13 Charlotte 49ers men's basketball
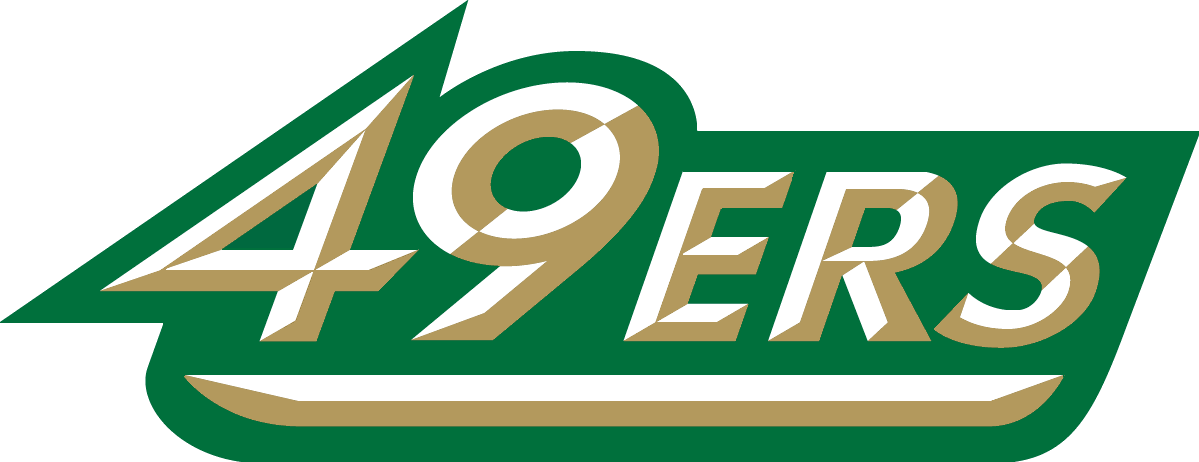

Great Alaska Shootout Champions

NIT, First Round
- Conference: Atlantic 10 Conference
- Record: 21–12 (8–8 A-10)
- Head coach: Alan Major (3rd season)
- Assistant coaches: Ryan Odom; Desmond Oliver; Orlando Vandross
- Home arena: Dale F. Halton Arena

2012–13 Atlantic 10 men's basketball standings
	Conf.				Overall
Team	W		L	PCT	W		L	PCT
No. 16 Saint Louis †	13	–	3	.813	28	–	7	.800
No. 25 VCU	12	–	4	.750	27	–	9	.750
Butler	11	–	5	.688	27	–	9	.750
La Salle	11	–	5	.688	24	–	10	.706
Temple	11	–	5	.688	24	–	10	.706
UMass	9	–	7	.563	21	–	12	.636
Xavier	9	–	7	.563	17	–	14	.548
Charlotte	8	–	8	.500	21	–	12	.636
Saint Joseph's	8	–	8	.500	18	–	14	.563
Richmond	8	–	8	.500	19	–	15	.559
Dayton	7	–	9	.438	17	–	14	.548
St. Bonaventure	7	–	9	.438	14	–	15	.483
George Washington	7	–	9	.438	13	–	17	.433
Rhode Island	3	–	13	.188	8	–	21	.276
Fordham	3	–	13	.188	7	–	24	.226
Duquesne	1	–	15	.063	8	–	22	.267
† 2013 Atlantic 10 Tournament winner As of March 28, 2013; Rankings from AP Poll

The 2012–13 Charlotte 49ers men's basketball team represented the University of North Carolina at Charlotte during the 2012–13 NCAA Division I men's basketball season. The 49ers, led by head coach Alan Major, played their home games at the Dale F. Halton Arena and were members of the Atlantic 10 Conference. This was their final year in the Atlantic 10 Conference as they move to Conference USA in 2014. They finished the season 21–12, 8–8 in A-10 play to finish in a three way tie for eighth place. They lost in the quarterfinals of the Atlantic 10 tournament to Saint Louis. They were invited to the 2013 NIT where they lost in the first round to Providence.

== Roster ==
2012–13 Charlotte 49ers men's basketball team
Players
Coaches

Pos.	#	Name	Height	Weight	Year	Hometown
F	1	Darion Clark	6 ft 6 in (1.98 m)	233 lb (106 kg)	Fr	Conyers, GA
G/F	5	E. Victor Nickerson	6 ft 7 in (2.01 m)	193 lb (88 kg)	So	Atlanta, GA
G	10	Denzel Ingram	5 ft 11 in (1.8 m)	173 lb (78 kg)	Fr	Chapel Hill, NC
G	11	DeMario Mayfield	6 ft 5 in (1.96 m)	202 lb (92 kg)	Jr	Royston, GA
C	12	Mike Thorne Jr.	6 ft 10 in (2.08 m)	254 lb (115 kg)	RS Fr	Fayetteville, NC
G	14	Terrence Williams	6 ft 4 in (1.93 m)	211 lb (96 kg)	So	Charlotte, NC
G	15	Pierriá Henry	6 ft 4 in (1.93 m)	200 lb (91 kg)	So	Charleston, WV
G	20	Colby Lewis	6 ft 2 in (1.88 m)	190 lb (86 kg)	Sr	Statesville, NC
F	21	Willie Clayton	6 ft 7 in (2.01 m)	236 lb (107 kg)	Fr	Thomasville, GA
G	24	Mitch Warner	6 ft 1 in (1.85 m)	193 lb (88 kg)	Fr	Charlotte, NC
F/C	30	JT Thompson	6 ft 6 in (1.98 m)	234 lb (106 kg)	Sr	Monroe, NC
F	35	Chris Braswell	6 ft 9 in (2.06 m)	227 lb (103 kg)	Sr	Capitol Heights, MD
C	43	Ilija Ivankovic	6 ft 10 in (2.08 m)	245 lb (111 kg)	Sr	Split, CRO
G	44	Ivan Benkovic	6 ft 5 in (1.96 m)	200 lb (91 kg)	Fr	Zagreb, CRO
F	50	Lamar Bradbury	6 ft 3 in (1.91 m)	216 lb (98 kg)	Sr	Charlotte, NC

Head coach

- Alan Major (Purdue)

Assistant coach(es)

- Ryan Odom (Hampden–Sydney)
- Desmond Oliver (Dominican (NY))
- Orlando Vandross (American International)

Legend

- (C) Team captain
- (S) Suspended
- (I) Ineligible
- (W) Walk-on
- Injured
- Current redshirt

Roster
Last update: 17 October 2012

== Schedule ==
Date time, TV	Rank^{#}	Opponent^{#}	Result	Record	Site (attendance) city, state
Exhibition
11/01/2012*; 7:00 pm		Pfeiffer	W 96–51		Halton Arena (4,737); Charlotte, NC
Non-Conference
11/09/2012*; 6:00 pm		Charleston Southern	W 68–58	1–0	Halton Arena (4,429); Charlotte, NC
11/13/2012*; 7:30 pm, NBCSN		Georgia Southern	W 66–53	2–0	Halton Arena (5,810); Charlotte, NC
11/17/2012*; 7:30 pm		Lamar	W 70–49	3–0	Halton Arena (4,620); Charlotte, NC
11/22/2012*; 11:30 pm, CBSSN		vs. Texas State; Great Alaska Shootout Quarterfinals	W 73–64	4–0	Sullivan Arena (4,201); Anchorage, AK
11/23/2012*; 1:30 am, CBSSN		vs. Oral Roberts; Great Alaska Shootout semifinals	W 72–58	5–0	Sullivan Arena (4,724); Anchorage, AK
11/25/2012*; 12:30 am, CBSSN		vs. Northeastern; Great Alaska Shootout Championship	W 67–59	6–0	Sullivan Arena (4,553); Anchorage, AK
12/01/2012*; 7:00 pm		East Carolina	W 76–64	7–0	Halton Arena (7,896); Charlotte, NC
12/05/2012*; 8:00 pm, ESPN3		at Davidson	W 73–69	8–0	John M. Belk Arena (5,267); Davidson, NC
12/08/2012*; 2:00 pm		Central Michigan	W 78–66	9–0	Halton Arena (5,263); Charlotte, NC
12/14/2012*; 7:00 pm, RSN/ESPN3		at Miami (FL)	L 46–77	9–1	BankUnited Center (3,275); Miami, FL
12/16/2012*; 4:00 pm		at Kennesaw State	W 66–52	10–1	KSU Convocation Center (1,115); Kennesaw, GA
12/19/2012*; 7:30 pm		Radford	W 68–52	11–1	Halton Arena (4,636); Charlotte, NC
12/22/2012*; 2:00 pm, CBSSN		vs. Florida State	L 76–79	11–2	Time Warner Cable Arena (7,249); Charlotte, NC
01/02/2013*; 7:30 pm		UNC Asheville	W 71–63 ^{OT}	12–2	Halton Arena (4,772); Charlotte, NC
Atlantic 10 Regular Season
01/09/2013; 7:30 pm		La Salle	W 74–65	13–2 (1–0)	Halton Arena (5,754); Charlotte, NC
01/12/2013; 2:00 pm		at Rhode Island	W 58–50	14–2 (2–0)	Ryan Center (3,758); Kingston, RI
01/16/2013; 7:30 pm		Fordham	W 74–68	15–2 (3–0)	Halton Arena (5,275); Charlotte, NC
01/19/2013; 6:00 pm		at Richmond	L 61–81	15–3 (3–1)	Robins Center (8,321); Richmond, VA
01/23/2013; 7:30 pm, FSOH		Xavier	W 63–57	16–3 (4–1)	Halton Arena (7,280); Charlotte, NC
01/26/2013; 2:00 pm		at George Washington	L 54–82	16–4 (4–2)	Smith Center (2,421); Washington, D.C.
02/02/2013; 2:00 pm		Massachusetts	W 66–65	17–4 (5–2)	Halton Arena (9,105); Charlotte, NC
02/06/2013; 7:00 pm		at Temple	L 88–89	17–5 (5–3)	Liacouras Center (4,785); Philadelphia, PA
02/09/2013; 7:00 pm		VCU	L 61–68	17–6 (5–4)	Halton Arena (8,794); Charlotte, NC
02/13/2013; 7:00 pm		at #11 Butler	W 71–67	18–6 (6–4)	Hinkle Fieldhouse (7,009); Indianapolis, IN
02/16/2013; 7:00 pm, FSMW		at Saint Louis	L 58–75	18–7 (6–5)	Chaifetz Arena (10,052); Saint Louis, MO
02/24/2013; 4:00 pm		Temple	L 51–71	18–8 (6–6)	Halton Arena (6,772); Charlotte, NC
02/27/2013; 7:30 pm, WHIO		Dayton	L 67–88	18–9 (6–7)	Halton Arena (5,113); Charlotte, NC
03/02/2013; 7:00 pm		at St. Bonaventure	L 83–104	18–10 (6–8)	Reilly Center (3,760); St. Bonaventure, NY
03/06/2013; 7:00 pm		at Duquesne	W 89–87 ^{OT}	19–10 (7–8)	Palumbo Center (2,339); Pittsburgh, PA
03/09/2013; 7:00 pm		Saint Joseph's	W 52–40	20–10 (8–8)	Halton Arena (4,713); Charlotte, NC
2013 Atlantic 10 Men's Basketball Tournament
03/14/2013; 12:00 pm, NBCSN		vs. Richmond; First Round	W 68–63	21–10	Barclays Center (N/A); Brooklyn, NY
03/15/2013; 12:00 pm, CSN		vs. No. 16 Saint Louis; Quarterfinals	L 55–72	21–11	Barclays Center (N/A); Brooklyn, NY
2013 National Invitation Tournament
03/20/2013*; 7:15 pm, ESPN3	No. (5)	at (4) Providence; First Round	L 66–75	21–12	Dunkin' Donuts Center (4,953); Providence, RI
*Non-conference game. ^{#}Rankings from AP Poll/Coaches' Poll. (#) Tournament seedings in parentheses. All times are in Eastern Time. (#) during NIT is seed within region.
