= 2012–13 St. Bonaventure Bonnies men's basketball team =

American college basketball season

2012–13 St. Bonaventure Bonnies men's basketball
- Conference: Atlantic 10 Conference
- Record: 14–15 (7–9 A-10)
- Head coach: Mark Schmidt (6th season)
- Assistant coaches: Dave Moore; Jeff Massey; Steve Curran
- Home arena: Reilly Center

2012–13 Atlantic 10 men's basketball standings
	Conf.				Overall
Team	W		L	PCT	W		L	PCT
No. 16 Saint Louis †	13	–	3	.813	28	–	7	.800
No. 25 VCU	12	–	4	.750	27	–	9	.750
Butler	11	–	5	.688	27	–	9	.750
La Salle	11	–	5	.688	24	–	10	.706
Temple	11	–	5	.688	24	–	10	.706
UMass	9	–	7	.563	21	–	12	.636
Xavier	9	–	7	.563	17	–	14	.548
Charlotte	8	–	8	.500	21	–	12	.636
Saint Joseph's	8	–	8	.500	18	–	14	.563
Richmond	8	–	8	.500	19	–	15	.559
Dayton	7	–	9	.438	17	–	14	.548
St. Bonaventure	7	–	9	.438	14	–	15	.483
George Washington	7	–	9	.438	13	–	17	.433
Rhode Island	3	–	13	.188	8	–	21	.276
Fordham	3	–	13	.188	7	–	24	.226
Duquesne	1	–	15	.063	8	–	22	.267
† 2013 Atlantic 10 Tournament winner As of March 28, 2013; Rankings from AP Poll

The 2012–13 St. Bonaventure Bonnies men's basketball team represented St. Bonaventure University during the 2012–13 NCAA Division I men's basketball season. The Bonnies, led by sixth year head coach Mark Schmidt, played their home games at the Reilly Center and were members of the Atlantic 10 Conference. They finished the season 14–15, 7–9 in A-10 play to finish in a three-way tie for 11th place. A year after being tournament champions, they failed to qualify for the Atlantic 10 tournament.

== Roster ==
2012–13 St. Bonaventure Bonnies men's basketball team
Players
Coaches

Pos.	#	Name	Height	Weight	Year	Hometown
G	2	Eric Mosley	5 ft 10 in (1.78 m)	170 lb (77 kg)	Jr	Louisville, KY
G	3	Charlon Kloof	6 ft 3 in (1.91 m)	195 lb (88 kg)	So	Paramaribo, SUR
G	5	Jordan Gathers	6 ft 3 in (1.91 m)	200 lb (91 kg)	Fr	Los Angeles, CA
G	10	Danny Farrell	6 ft 0 in (1.83 m)	170 lb (77 kg)	So	Binghamton, NY
F	11	Demitrius Conger	6 ft 6 in (1.98 m)	205 lb (93 kg)	Jr	Brooklyn, NY
F	12	Zach Moore	6 ft 3 in (1.91 m)	210 lb (95 kg)	Sr	Olean, NY
C	21	Youssou Ndoye	6 ft 11 in (2.11 m)	235 lb (107 kg)	Fr	Dakar, SEN
G/F	23	Chris Johnson	6 ft 5 in (1.96 m)	205 lb (93 kg)	Jr	North Preston, NS
G	24	Matthew Wright	6 ft 4 in (1.93 m)	200 lb (91 kg)	So	Toronto, ON
G	32	Michael Davenport	6 ft 5 in (1.96 m)	210 lb (95 kg)	Sr	Cincinnati, OH
F	33	Marquise Simmons	6 ft 8 in (2.03 m)	230 lb (104 kg)	RS Jr	Capitol Heights, MD
F	43	Da'Quan Cook	6 ft 8 in (2.03 m)	235 lb (107 kg)	RS Sr	Elizabeth, NJ
C	45	Jake Houseknecht	6 ft 9 in (2.06 m)	210 lb (95 kg)	RS Jr	Olean, NY

Head coach

- Mark Schmidt (Boston College)

Assistant coach(es)

- Dave Moore (Bethel (TN))
- Jeff Massey (Xavier)
- Steve Curran (Merrimack)

Legend

- (C) Team captain
- (S) Suspended
- (I) Ineligible
- (W) Walk-on
- Injured
- Current redshirt

Roster
Last update: 04 August 2011

== Schedule ==
Date time, TV	Opponent	Result	Record	High points	High rebounds	High assists	Site (attendance) city, state
Exhibition
Nov. 03*; 3:00 pm	Mansfield	W 104–61		25 – Conger	9 – Conger	6 – Wright	Reilly Center (2,637); St. Bonaventure, NY
Regular season
Nov. 09*; 7:00 pm	Bethune-Cookman	W 65–55	1–0	14 – Mosley	7 – Conger	4 – Conger	Reilly Center (4,215); St. Bonaventure, NY
Nov. 14*; 7:00 pm, NBCSN	at Cornell	W 72–68	2–0	19 – Johnson	7 – D. Wright	5 – M. Wright	Newman Arena (3,016); Ithaca, NY
Nov. 17*; 4:00 pm	at Canisius	L 69–72	2–1	19 – Johnson	8 – Simmons	4 – Kloof	Koessler Center (2,196); Buffalo, NY
Nov. 24*; 4:00 pm	vs. Niagara; Fibertech Classic	W 80–75	3–1	19 – Johnson	12 – Simmonds	5 – Conger, Wright	Blue Cross Arena (4,758); Rochester, NY
Nov. 28*; 7:00 pm	at Ohio	L 64–69	3–2	19 – Mosley	7 – Conger	4 – Johnson, Mosley	Convocation Center (6,389); Athens, OH
Dec. 01*; 7:00 pm	Buffalo	W 82–79	4–2	20 – Conger	8 – Simmons	4 – Conger	Reilly Center (4,485); St. Bonaventure, NY
Dec. 04*; 9:00 pm, NBCSN	Siena; Franciscan Cup	W 58–43	5–2	14 – Conger	10 – Simmons	4 – Conger	Reilly Center (3,482); St. Bonaventure, NY
Dec. 08*; 3:00 pm	at Arkansas State	L 70–73	5–3	19 – Johnson	12 – Conger	4 – Kloof, Gathers	Convocation Center (2,378); Jonesboro, AR
Dec. 15*; 2:00 pm	Cleveland State	W 87–53	6–3	15 – Conger	11 – Conger	4 – Conger	Reilly Center (3,223); St. Bonaventure, NY
Dec. 19*; 7:00 pm	The Citadel	W 97–57	7–3	16 – Conger, Johnson	9 – Simmons	7 – Mosley	Reilly Center (3,286); St. Bonaventure, NY
Dec. 22*; 3:00 pm, ESPN3	at No. 25 NC State	L 73–92	7–4	18 – Mosley	14 – Ndoye	3 – Conger	PNC Arena (16,288); Raleigh, NC
Dec. 31*; 1:00 pm	Iona	L 74–93	7–5	26 – Conger	8 – Conger	8 – Kloof	Reilly Center (3,472); St. Bonaventure, NY
Jan. 05*; 4:30 pm	at Colorado State	L 64–85	7–6	12 – Wright	6 – Simmons	4 – Wright	Moby Arena (3,922); Fort Collins, CO
Jan. 09; 7:00 pm	at George Washington	L 59–78	7–7 (0–1)	17 – Johnson	8 – Simmons	2 – Mosley	Smith Center (1,985); Washington, D.C.
Jan. 12; 4:00 pm, CBSSN-Regional	at VCU	L 65–72	7–8 (0–2)	19 – Conger	7 – Conger	4 – Johnson, Kloof	Reilly Center (4,675); St. Bonaventure, NY
Jan. 16; 8:00 pm, CBSSN	Xavier	L 64–66	7–9 (0–3)	16 – Ndoye	7 – Conger	5 – Johnson	Reilly Center (3,892); St. Bonaventure, NY
Jan. 19; 1:00 pm, CBSSN	at Temple	W 81–78	8–9 (1–3)	22 – Wright	9 – Conger	7 – Johnson	Liacouras Center (6,607); Philadelphia, PA
Jan. 23; 7:00 pm	at Saint Joseph's	W 73–64	9–9 (2–3)	21 – Conger	7 – Conger	4 – Mosley	Hagan Arena (4,051); Philadelphia, PA
Jan. 26; 4:00 pm, CBSSN-Regional	Saint Louis	L 57–67	9–10 (2–4)	15 – Conger	9 – Conger	2 – Conger, Gathers	Reilly Center (4,839); St. Bonaventure, NY
Feb. 02; 4:00 pm, CBSSN-Regional	Duquesne	W 68–60	10–10 (3–4)	14 – Mosley	6 – Simmons	4 – Kloof	Reilly Center (4,991); St. Bonaventure, NY
Feb. 06; 7:00 pm, CBSSN-Regional	at No. 14 Butler	L 58–77	10–11 (3–5)	18 – Conger	4 – Simmons	2 – Conger, Gathers, Kloof	Hinkle Fieldhouse (6,591); Indianapolis, IN
Feb. 09; 7:00 pm	at Rhode Island	W 67–61	11–11 (4–5)	21 – Mosley	6 – Ndoye	5 – Conger	Ryan Center (1,933); Kingston, RI
Feb. 13; 7:00 pm	La Salle	L 66–69 ^{OT}	11–12 (4–6)	15 – Mosley	9 – Ndoye	5 – Conger	Reilly Center (3,521); St. Bonaventure, NY
Feb. 16; 6:00 pm	at Richmond	L 80–83 ^{OT}	11–13 (4–7)	30 – Mosley	7 – Conger	4 – Conger	Robins Center (8,432); Richmond, VA
Feb. 20; 7:00 pm	Massachusetts	W 99–94	12–13 (5–7)	39 – Mosley	13 – Conger	5 – Gathers	Reilly Center (3,468); St. Bonaventure, NY
Feb. 23; 7:00 pm	at Duquesne	W 78–71	13–13 (6–7)	19 – Conger, Johnson	9 – Conger	5 – Mosley	Palumbo Center (3,329); Pittsburgh, PA
Mar. 02; 7:00 pm	Charlotte	W 104–83	14–13 (7–7)	23 – Mosley	13 – Conger	7 – Conger	Reilly Center (3,760); St. Bonaventure, NY
Mar. 06; 7:00 pm	at Dayton	L 63–75	14–14 (7–8)	22 – Conger	6 – Conger	4 – Gathers	University of Dayton Arena (12,162); Dayton, OH
Mar. 09; 4:00 pm	Fordham	L 72–76	14–15 (7–9)	17 – Conger, Ndoye, Mosley	6 – Conger	4 – Conger, Kloof	Reilly Center (4,515); St. Bonaventure, NY
*Non-conference game. ^{#}Rankings from AP Poll/Coaches' Poll. (#) Tournament seedings in parentheses. All times are in Eastern Time..
