= 2012–13 Richmond Spiders men's basketball team =

American college basketball season

2012–13 Richmond Spiders men's basketball

CBI, Quarterfinals
- Conference: Atlantic 10 Conference
- Record: 19–15 (8–8 A-10)
- Head coach: Chris Mooney (8th season)
- Assistant coaches: Kevin McGeehan (8th season); Jamal Brunt (6th season); Rob Jones (5th season)
- Home arena: Robins Center

2012–13 Atlantic 10 men's basketball standings
| | Conf. | | | | Overall |
| Team | W | | L | PCT | W | | L | PCT |
|---|---|---|---|---|---|---|---|---|
| No. 16 Saint Louis † | 13 | – | 3 | .813 | 28 | – | 7 | .800 |
| No. 25 VCU | 12 | – | 4 | .750 | 27 | – | 9 | .750 |
| Butler | 11 | – | 5 | .688 | 27 | – | 9 | .750 |
| La Salle | 11 | – | 5 | .688 | 24 | – | 10 | .706 |
| Temple | 11 | – | 5 | .688 | 24 | – | 10 | .706 |
| UMass | 9 | – | 7 | .563 | 21 | – | 12 | .636 |
| Xavier | 9 | – | 7 | .563 | 17 | – | 14 | .548 |
| Charlotte | 8 | – | 8 | .500 | 21 | – | 12 | .636 |
| Saint Joseph's | 8 | – | 8 | .500 | 18 | – | 14 | .563 |
| Richmond | 8 | – | 8 | .500 | 19 | – | 15 | .559 |
| Dayton | 7 | – | 9 | .438 | 17 | – | 14 | .548 |
| St. Bonaventure | 7 | – | 9 | .438 | 14 | – | 15 | .483 |
| George Washington | 7 | – | 9 | .438 | 13 | – | 17 | .433 |
| Rhode Island | 3 | – | 13 | .188 | 8 | – | 21 | .276 |
| Fordham | 3 | – | 13 | .188 | 7 | – | 24 | .226 |
| Duquesne | 1 | – | 15 | .063 | 8 | – | 22 | .267 |
† 2013 Atlantic 10 Tournament winner As of March 28, 2013; Rankings from AP Poll

The 2012–13 Richmond Spiders men's basketball team represented the University of Richmond in National Collegiate Athletic Association (NCAA) Division I college basketball during the 2012–13 season. Richmond competed as a member of the Atlantic 10 Conference (A-10) under eighth-year head basketball coach Chris Mooney and played its home games at the Robins Center.

This season was the 100th in Richmond basketball history.

== Preseason ==
=== Recruiting ===
College recruiting information
| Name | Hometown | School | Height | Weight | Commit date |
|---|---|---|---|---|---|
| Terry Allen; PF | Houston, Texas | Manvel HS | 6 ft 8 in (2.03 m) | 220 lb (100 kg) | Aug 12, 2011 |
| Terry Allen; PF | Recruit ratings: Scout: Rivals: (82) | | | | |
| Deion Taylor; SF | New Orleans, Louisiana | St. Augustine HS | 6 ft 7 in (2.01 m) | 180 lb (82 kg) | Sep 19, 2011 |
| Deion Taylor; SF | Recruit ratings: (85) | | | | |
Overall recruit ranking: Scout: NR Rivals: NR ESPN: NR
Note: In many cases, Scout, Rivals, 247Sports, On3, and ESPN may conflict in their listings of height and weight.; In these cases, the average was taken. ESPN grades are on a 100-point scale.; Sources: "Rivals.com 2012 Richmond Commitments". Rivals.; "Scout.com 2012 Richmond Commitments". Scout.; "ESPN 2012 Richmond Commitments". ESPN.; "Scout.com Team Recruiting Rankings". Scout.; "2012 Team Ranking". Rivals.

== 100 Years celebration ==
The University celebrated the 100th season of Spider basketball in several ways. Many former Spider players, coaches and teams were honored throughout the season and on January 22 the school announced their All-Time team, honored at halftime of their February 9 game against Saint Louis:

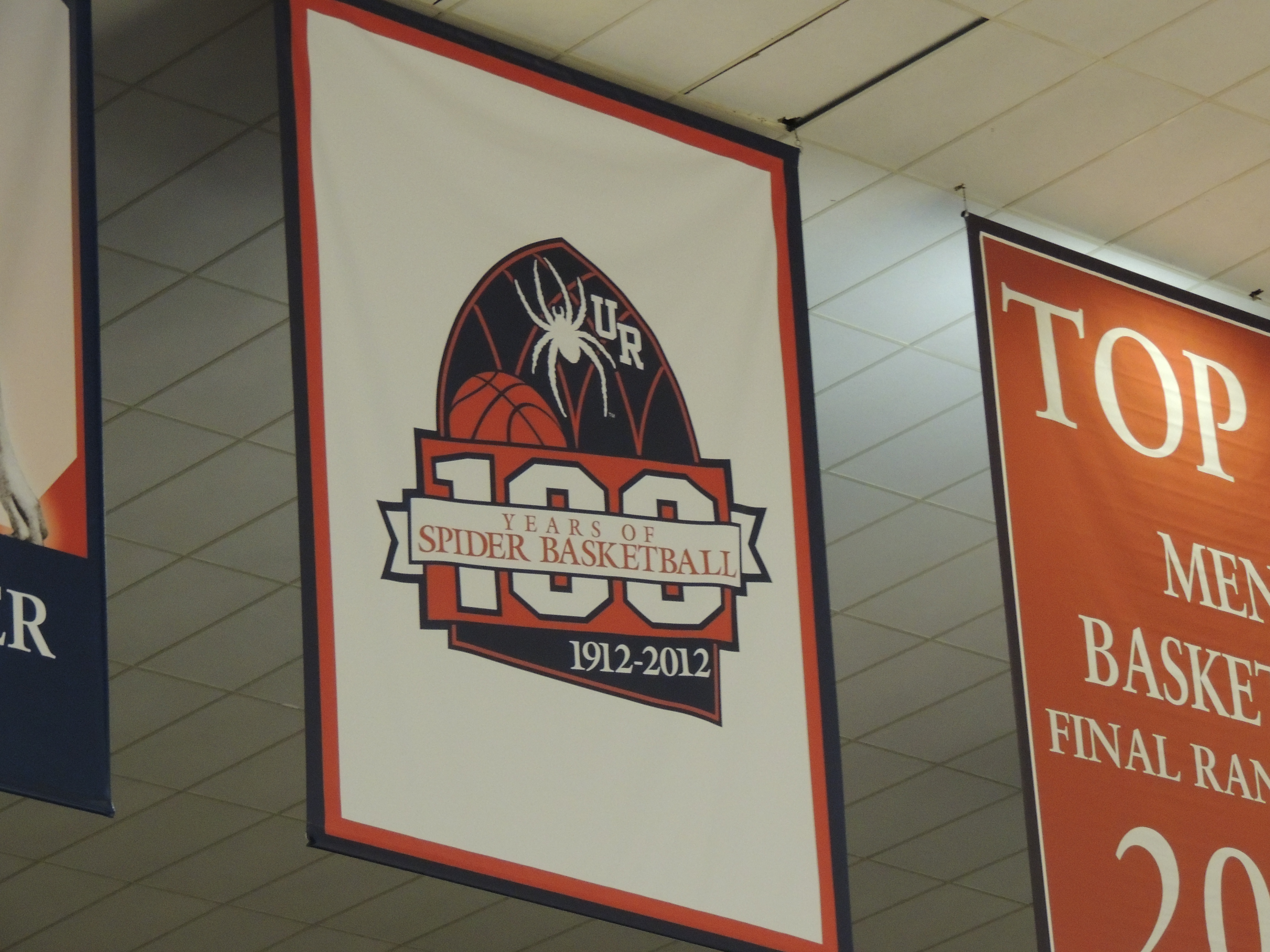
Banner commemorating 100 seasons of Spiders basketball

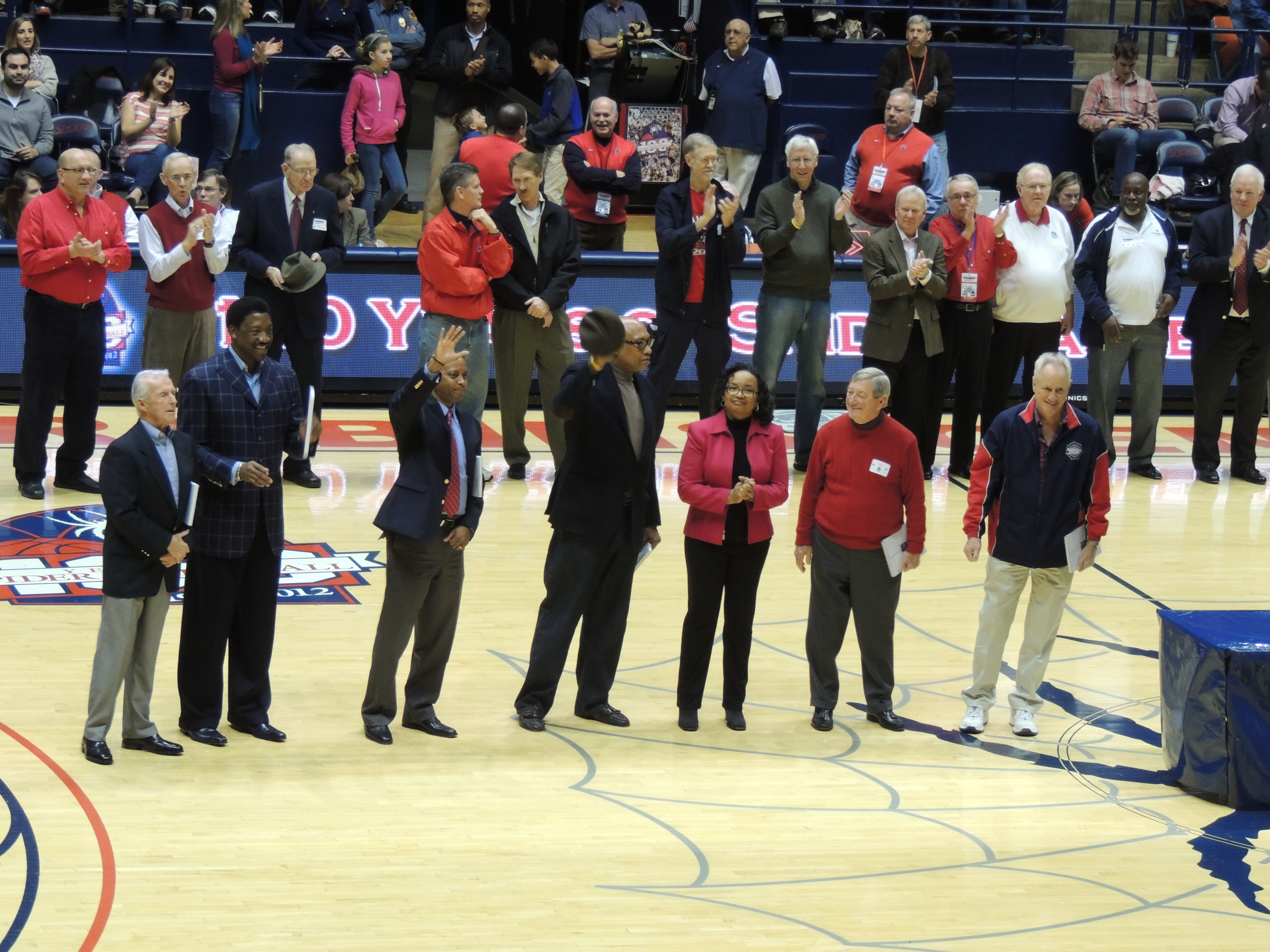
Ceremony honoring the UR All-Century team on February 9, 2013

- Kevin Anderson (2007–2011)
- Ken Atkinson (1986–1990)
- Greg Beckwith (1982–1986)
- Curtis Blair (1986–1992)
- Tony Dobbins (2001–2004)
- David Gonzalvez (2006–2010)
- Justin Harper (2007–2011)
- Ed Harrison (1952–1956)
- Bob McCurdy (1973–1975)
- Warren Mills (1951–1955)
- Johnny Moates (1964–1967)
- Johnny Newman (1982–1986)
- Michael Perry (1977–1981)
- John Schweitz (1978–1982)
- Aron Stewart (1972–1974)
- Dick Tarrant - Coach
- Peter Woolfolk (1984–1988)

== Roster ==
2012–13 Richmond Spiders men's basketball team
Players
Coaches

| Pos. | # | Name | Height | Weight | Year | Hometown |
|---|---|---|---|---|---|---|
| G | 0 | Kendall Anthony | 5 ft 8 in (1.73 m) | 140 lb (64 kg) | So | Jackson, Tennessee |
| G | 1 | Luke Moyer | 6 ft 0 in (1.83 m) | 170 lb (77 kg) | Fr | Souderton, Pennsylvania |
| G | 2 | Cedrick Lindsay | 6 ft 1 in (1.85 m) | 190 lb (86 kg) | Jr | Washington, D.C. |
| G | 3 | Darien Brothers | 6 ft 3 in (1.91 m) | 200 lb (91 kg) | Sr | Richmond, Virginia |
| G | 4 | Wayne Sparrow | 6 ft 3 in (1.91 m) | 180 lb (82 kg) | RS So | Baltimore, Maryland |
| F | 5 | Trey Davis | 6 ft 5 in (1.96 m) | 200 lb (91 kg) | RS Fr | Richmond, Virginia |
| G | 10 | Jonathan Benjamin | 6 ft 1 in (1.85 m) | 170 lb (77 kg) | Sr | Rochester, New York |
| F | 11 | Deion Taylor | 6 ft 7 in (2.01 m) | 180 lb (82 kg) | Fr | New Orleans, Louisiana |
| G | 12 | John Moran | 6 ft 3 in (1.91 m) | 175 lb (79 kg) | Fr | Phoenixville, Pennsylvania |
| F | 15 | Terry Allen | 6 ft 8 in (2.03 m) | 220 lb (100 kg) | Fr | Houston, Texas |
| G | 22 | Greg Robbins | 6 ft 5 in (1.96 m) | 220 lb (100 kg) | Sr | Wynnewood, Pennsylvania |
| C | 25 | Luke Piotrowski | 6 ft 11 in (2.11 m) | 240 lb (109 kg) | RS Fr | Atlantic City, New Jersey |
| G | 30 | Zach Chu | 5 ft 8 in (1.73 m) | 160 lb (73 kg) | So | Dallas, Texas |
| F | 33 | Alonzo Nelson-Ododa | 6 ft 9 in (2.06 m) | 210 lb (95 kg) | RS Fr | Atlanta, Georgia |
| F | 34 | Derrick Williams | 6 ft 6 in (1.98 m) | 270 lb (122 kg) | Jr | Harlem, New York |

Head coach

- Chris Mooney (Princeton)

Assistant coach(es)

- Kevin McGeehan (Gettysburg)
- Jamal Brunt (Randolph-Macon)
- Rob Jones (Toccoa Falls)

Legend

- (C) Team captain
- (S) Suspended
- (I) Ineligible
- (W) Walk-on
- Injured
- Current redshirt

Roster
Last update: 2012-11-13

== Schedule ==
| Date time, TV | Rank^{#} | Opponent^{#} | Result | Record | Site (attendance) city, state |
Regular Season
| November 9*; 7:00 pm | | Liberty | W 84–42 | 1–0 | Robins Center (6,978); Richmond, Virginia |
| November 13*; 7:00 pm | | UNC Wilmington; Nation of Coaches Classic | W 101–58 | 2–0 | Robins Center (3,753); Richmond, Virginia |
| November 15*; 7:00 pm | | Hampton; Nation of Coaches Classic | W 68–58 | 3–0 | Robins Center (3,857); Richmond, Virginia |
| November 18*; 7:00 pm, BTN | | at Minnesota | L 57–72 | 3–1 | Williams Arena (11,341); Minneapolis, Minnesota |
| November 20*; 7:00 pm | | Wofford; Nation of Coaches Classic | W 64–58 | 4–1 | Robins Center (3,867); Richmond, Virginia |
| November 24*; 2:00 pm | | at Ohio; Nation of Coaches Classic | L 48–73 | 4–2 | Convocation Center (4,211); Athens, Ohio |
| November 28*; 7:00 pm | | William & Mary | W 86–78 ^{2OT} | 5–2 | Robins Center (4,052); Richmond, Virginia |
| December 1*; 6:00 pm | | Wake Forest | W 62–60 | 6–2 | Robins Center (6,591); Richmond, Virginia |
| December 4*; 7:00 pm, NBCSN | | at Old Dominion | W 80–53 | 7–2 | Ted Constant Convocation Center (6,797); Norfolk, Virginia |
| December 8*; 7:00 pm | | at James Madison | W 83–82 ^{OT} | 8–2 | JMU Convocation Center (4,351); Harrisonburg, Virginia |
| December 15*; 6:00 pm | | Stetson | W 76–57 | 9–2 | Robins Center (4,672); Richmond, Virginia |
| December 18*; 7:00 pm, ESPN2 | | at No. 9 Kansas | L 59–87 | 9–3 | Allen Fieldhouse (16,300); Lawrence, Kansas |
| December 22*; 3:00 pm, NBCSN | | vs. George Mason; Governor's Holiday Hoops Classic | L 64–67 | 9–4 | Richmond Coliseum (6,944); Richmond, Virginia |
| December 29*; 6:00 pm | | Davidson | L 64–70 | 9–5 | Robins Center (6,071); Richmond, Virginia |
| January 2*; 7:00 pm | | Air Force | W 91–68 | 10–5 | Robins Center (4,017); Richmond, Virginia |
| January 9; 7:00 pm | | Rhode Island | W 64–61 | 11–5 (1–0) | Robins Center (4,024); Richmond, Virginia |
| January 12; 2:00 pm | | at La Salle | L 59–71 | 11–6 (1–1) | Tom Gola Arena (2,282); Philadelphia, Pennsylvania |
| January 16; 7:00 pm | | at No. 13 Butler | L 47–62 | 11–7 (1–2) | Hinkle Fieldhouse (7,022); Indianapolis, Indiana |
| January 19; 6:00 pm | | Charlotte | W 81–61 | 12–7 (2–2) | Robins Center (8,321); Richmond, Virginia |
| January 24; 7:00 pm, CBSSN | | No. 19 VCU | W 86–74 ^{OT} | 13–7 (3–2) | Robins Center (9,071); Richmond, Virginia |
| January 27; 2:00 pm | | at Massachusetts | L 65–70 | 13–8 (3–3) | Mullins Center (5,467); Amherst, Massachusetts |
| January 30; 7:00 pm | | at Temple | L 64–71 | 13–9 (3–4) | Liacouras Center (4,769); Philadelphia, Pennsylvania |
| February 2; 6:00 pm, FS Ohio | | Xavier | W 73–71 | 14–9 (4–4) | Robins Center (8,317); Richmond, Virginia |
| February 9; 6:00 pm | | Saint Louis | L 46–56 | 14–10 (4–5) | Robins Center (8,121); Richmond, Virginia |
| February 13; 7:00 pm | | at Saint Joseph's | L 55–61 | 14–11 (4–6) | Hagan Arena (3,651); Philadelphia, Pennsylvania |
| February 16; 6:00 pm | | St. Bonaventure | W 83–80 ^{OT} | 15–11 (5–6) | Robins Center (8,432); Richmond, Virginia |
| February 23; 1:00 pm | | at Fordham | W 72–55 | 16–11 (6–6) | Rose Hill Gymnasium (2,862); Bronx, New York |
| February 27; 7:00 pm | | George Washington | W 73–64 | 17–11 (7–6) | Robins Center (4,402); Richmond, Virginia |
| March 2; 4:00 pm, CBSSN-Regional | | at Dayton | L 74–78 | 17–12 (7–7) | University of Dayton Arena (12,317); Dayton, Ohio |
| March 6; 8:00 pm, CBSSN | | at No. 21 VCU | L 82–93 | 17–13 (7–8) | Siegel Center (7,693); Richmond, Virginia |
| March 9; 6:00 pm | | Duquesne | W 79–55 | 18–13 (8–8) | Robins Center (6,951); Richmond, Virginia |
2013 Atlantic 10 men's basketball tournament
| March 14; 12:00 pm, NBCSN | | vs. Charlotte; First Round | L 63–68 | 18–14 | Barclays Center (N/A); Brooklyn, New York |
2013 College Basketball Invitational
| March 20*; 7:00 pm | | at Bryant; First Round | W 76–71 | 19–14 | Chace Athletic Center (1,854); Smithfield, Rhode Island |
| March 25*; 7:00 pm | | at Wright State; Quarterfinals | L 51–57 | 19–15 | Nutter Center (3,741); Fairborn, Ohio |
*Non-conference game. ^{#}Rankings from AP Poll. (#) Tournament seedings in parentheses. All times are in Eastern Time.
