= 2012–13 George Washington Colonials men's basketball team =

American college basketball season

2012–13 George Washington Colonials men's basketball
- Conference: Atlantic 10 Conference
- Record: 13–17 (7–9 A-10)
- Head coach: Mike Lonergan (2nd season)
- Assistant coaches: Hajj Turner; Pete Strickland; Kevin Sutton
- Home arena: Charles E. Smith Athletic Center

2012–13 Atlantic 10 men's basketball standings
	Conf.				Overall
Team	W		L	PCT	W		L	PCT
No. 16 Saint Louis †	13	–	3	.813	28	–	7	.800
No. 25 VCU	12	–	4	.750	27	–	9	.750
Butler	11	–	5	.688	27	–	9	.750
La Salle	11	–	5	.688	24	–	10	.706
Temple	11	–	5	.688	24	–	10	.706
UMass	9	–	7	.563	21	–	12	.636
Xavier	9	–	7	.563	17	–	14	.548
Charlotte	8	–	8	.500	21	–	12	.636
Saint Joseph's	8	–	8	.500	18	–	14	.563
Richmond	8	–	8	.500	19	–	15	.559
Dayton	7	–	9	.438	17	–	14	.548
St. Bonaventure	7	–	9	.438	14	–	15	.483
George Washington	7	–	9	.438	13	–	17	.433
Rhode Island	3	–	13	.188	8	–	21	.276
Fordham	3	–	13	.188	7	–	24	.226
Duquesne	1	–	15	.063	8	–	22	.267
† 2013 Atlantic 10 Tournament winner As of March 28, 2013; Rankings from AP Poll

The 2012–13 George Washington Colonials men's basketball team represented George Washington University during the 2012–13 NCAA Division I men's basketball season. The Colonials, led by second year head coach Mike Lonergan, played their home games at the Charles E. Smith Athletic Center and were members of the Atlantic 10 Conference. They finished the season 13–17, 7–9 in A-10 play to finish in a three-way tie for eleventh place. They lost in the first round of the Atlantic 10 tournament to Massachusetts.

== Previous season ==
Under new head coach Mike Lonergan, the Colonials lost 10 of their last 12 games to finish with a record of 10–21.

== Roster ==
2012–13 George Washington Colonials men's basketball team
Players
Coaches

Pos.	#	Name	Height	Weight	Year	Hometown
F	00	Dwayne Smith	6 ft 6 in (1.98 m)	227 lb (103 kg)	Sr	Toronto, ON
G	5	Bryan Bynes	6 ft 3 in (1.91 m)	173 lb (78 kg)	Sr	Ft. Lauderdale, FL
G	11	Kethan Savage	6 ft 3 in (1.91 m)	—	Fr	Fairfax, VA
F	12	David Pellom	6 ft 8 in (2.03 m)	220 lb (100 kg)	Sr	Wilmington, NC
G/F	13	Patricio Garino	6 ft 5 in (1.96 m)	—	Fr	Mar del Plata, ARG
G	20	Lasan Kromah	6 ft 5 in (1.96 m)	202 lb (92 kg)	Sr	Greenbelt, MD
F	21	Kevin Larsen	6 ft 10 in (2.08 m)	—	Fr	Copenhagen, DEN
G	22	Joe McDonald	6 ft 1 in (1.85 m)	—	Fr	Lorton, VA
F	24	Jonathan Davis	6 ft 7 in (2.01 m)	215 lb (98 kg)	So	Simi Valley, CA
F	30	Nemanja Mikic	6 ft 8 in (2.03 m)	227 lb (103 kg)	Jr	Novi Sad, SRB
F	32	Isaiah Armwood	6 ft 9 in (2.06 m)	192 lb (87 kg)	Jr	Baltimore, MD
F	33	Paris Maragkos	6 ft 9 in (2.06 m)	—	Fr	Marousi, GRE
F	34	John Kopriva	6 ft 8 in (2.03 m)	207 lb (94 kg)	So	Milwaukee, WI

Head coach

- Mike Lonergan (Catholic)

Assistant coach(es)

- Hajj Turner (Louisville)
- Pete Strickland (Pittsburgh)
- Kevin Sutton (James Madison)

Legend

- (C) Team captain
- (S) Suspended
- (I) Ineligible
- (W) Walk-on
- Injured
- Current redshirt

Roster
Last update: 03 August 2012

== Schedule ==
Date time, TV	Opponent	Result	Record	Site (attendance) city, state
Exhibition
11/03/2012*; 2:00 pm	Catholic	W 72–46	–	Smith Center (1,792); Washington, DC
Regular season
11/10/2012*; 4:00 pm	Youngstown State	L 73–80	0–1	Smith Center (2,198); Washington, DC
11/17/2012*; 1:00 pm, CSNMA	at Boston University	W 72–59	1–1	Agganis Arena (1,007); Boston, MA
11/21/2012*; 7:00 pm, ESPN3	at Notre Dame	L 48–65	1–2	Purcell Pavilion (8,133); South Bend, IN
11/24/2012*; 2:00 pm	Hofstra	W 80–56	2–2	Smith Center (1,371); Washington, DC
11/26/2012*; 7:00 pm	Mount St. Mary's	L 56–65	2–3	Smith Center (1,507); Washington, DC
11/28/2012*; 7:00 pm	at James Madison	W 54–53	3–3	JMU Convocation Center (3,314); Harrisonburg, VA
12/02/2012*; 12:15 pm, MASN	vs. Manhattan; BB&T Classic	W 67–55	4–3	Verizon Center (10,256); Washington, DC
12/04/2012*; 8:00 pm	at Bradley	L 68–72	4–4	Carver Arena (6,313); Peoria, IL
12/08/2012*; 2:30 pm, CBSSN	Kansas State	L 62–65	4–5	Smith Center (3,570); Washington, DC
12/11/2012*; 7:30 pm, SNY/ESPN3	at Rutgers	L 65–68	4–6	Brown Athletic Center (4,385); Piscataway, NJ
12/22/2012*; 3:00 pm	VMI	W 76–67	5–6	Smith Center (1,753); Washington, DC
12/30/2012*; 2:00 pm	Sacred Heart	W 77–38	6–6	Smith Center (1,764); Washington, DC
01/04/2013*; 7:00 pm, CSNMA/ESPN3	at Georgia	L 41–52	6–7	Stegeman Coliseum (4,885); Athens, GA
01/09/2013; 7:00 pm	St. Bonaventure	W 78–59	7–7 (1–0)	Smith Center (1,985); Washington, DC
01/12/2013; 4:00 pm, CBSSN	at Xavier	L 56–71	7–8 (1–1)	Cintas Center (10,005); Cincinnati, OH
01/16/2013; 7:00 pm, CSNMA	Temple	L 53–55	7–9 (1–2)	Smith Center (2,430); Washington, DC
01/19/2013; 4:00 pm	at Massachusetts	W 79–76	8–9 (2–2)	Mullins Center (7,143); Amherst, MA
01/23/2013; 7:00 pm, OSN	at Rhode Island	W 66–65	9–9 (3–2)	Ryan Center (4,111); Kingston, RI
01/26/2013; 2:00 pm, CSNMA	Charlotte	W 82–54	10–9 (4–2)	Smith Center (2,421); Washington, DC
02/02/2013; 2:00 pm	La Salle	L 71–80	10–10 (4–3)	Smith Center (3,347); Washington, D.C.
02/06/2013; 7:00 pm	at Duquesne	W 79–57	11–10 (5–3)	Palumbo Center (2,960); Pittsburgh, PA
02/09/2013; 2:00 pm, CSNMA	No. 14 Butler	L 56–59	11–11 (5–4)	Smith Center (4,488); Washington, DC
02/16/2013; 7:30 pm, CSNMA	at VCU	L 57–84	11–12 (5–5)	Siegel Center (7,693); Richmond, VA
02/20/2013; 7:00 pm, CSNMA	Fordham	W 68–60	12–12 (6–5)	Smith Center (2,240); Washington, DC
02/23/2013; 4:00 pm, CSNMA	at Saint Joseph's	L 59–71	12–13 (6–6)	Hagan Arena (4,200); Philadelphia, PA
02/27/2013; 7:00 pm	at Richmond	L 64–73	12–14 (6–7)	Robins Center (4,402); Richmond, VA
03/02/2013; 4:00 pm, CSNMA	No. 18 Saint Louis	L 58–66	12–15 (6–8)	Smith Center (3,258); Washington, DC
03/06/2013; 7:00 pm	at La Salle	L 70–84	12–16 (6–9)	Tom Gola Arena (1,833); Philadelphia, PA
03/09/2013; 2:00 pm, CBSSNR	Dayton	W 81–80 ^{OT}	13–16 (7–9)	Smith Center (3,421); Washington, DC
Atlantic 10 tournament
03/14/2013; 9:00 pm, NBCSN	vs. Massachusetts; First Round	L 72–77	13–17	Barclays Center (5,751); Brooklyn, NY
*Non-conference game. ^{#}Rankings from AP Poll/Coaches' Poll. (#) Tournament seedings in parentheses. All times are in Eastern Time..
