= 2012–13 Saint Louis Billikens men's basketball team =

American college basketball season

2012–13 Saint Louis Billikens men's basketball
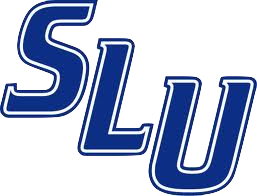

Atlantic 10 regular season and tournament champions

NCAA Tournament, Round of 32
- Conference: Atlantic 10 Conference

Ranking
- Coaches: No. 16
- AP: No. 13
- Record: 28–7 (13–3 A-10)
- Head coach: Rick Majerus (6th year) (medical leave of absence)"(Died 12/1/12)"
- Assistant coaches: Jim Crews (2nd year) (interim head coach); Jim Whitesell (2nd year) (associate head coach); Tanner Bronson (1st season)
- Home arena: Chaifetz Arena

2012–13 Atlantic 10 men's basketball standings
	Conf.				Overall
Team	W		L	PCT	W		L	PCT
No. 16 Saint Louis †	13	–	3	.813	28	–	7	.800
No. 25 VCU	12	–	4	.750	27	–	9	.750
Butler	11	–	5	.688	27	–	9	.750
La Salle	11	–	5	.688	24	–	10	.706
Temple	11	–	5	.688	24	–	10	.706
UMass	9	–	7	.563	21	–	12	.636
Xavier	9	–	7	.563	17	–	14	.548
Charlotte	8	–	8	.500	21	–	12	.636
Saint Joseph's	8	–	8	.500	18	–	14	.563
Richmond	8	–	8	.500	19	–	15	.559
Dayton	7	–	9	.438	17	–	14	.548
St. Bonaventure	7	–	9	.438	14	–	15	.483
George Washington	7	–	9	.438	13	–	17	.433
Rhode Island	3	–	13	.188	8	–	21	.276
Fordham	3	–	13	.188	7	–	24	.226
Duquesne	1	–	15	.063	8	–	22	.267
† 2013 Atlantic 10 Tournament winner As of March 28, 2013; Rankings from AP Poll

The 2012–13 Saint Louis Billikens men's basketball team represented Saint Louis University in the 2012–13 NCAA Division I men's basketball season. The Billikens' head coach Rick Majerus was to sit the season out for health concerns while Jim Crews served as the interim head coach. Majerus died on December 1, 2012. The team played their home games at Chaifetz Arena. They were a member of the Atlantic 10 Conference. They finished the season 28–7, 13–3 in A-10 play to win the regular season conference championship. They were also champions of the Atlantic 10 tournament, defeating VCU in the championship game, to earn the conference's automatic bid to the 2013 NCAA tournament where they defeated New Mexico State in the first round before losing in the second round to Oregon.

== Roster ==
2012–13 Saint Louis Billikens men's basketball team
Players
Coaches

Pos.	#	Name	Height	Weight	Year	Previous school	Hometown
F	1	Grandy Glaze	6 ft 6 in (1.98 m)	235 lb (107 kg)	So	Notre Dame Prep	Toronto, ON
G	2	Austin McBroom	5 ft 9 in (1.75 m)	165 lb (75 kg)	RS So	Campbell Hall	North Hollywood, CA
G	3	Kwamain Mitchell	5 ft 10 in (1.78 m)	175 lb (79 kg)	Sr	Dominican	Milwaukee, WI
G	5	Jordair Jett	6 ft 1 in (1.85 m)	215 lb (98 kg)	Jr	Notre Dame Prep	St. Paul, MN
G	10	Joey LePak	6 ft 1 in (1.85 m)	170 lb (77 kg)	Fr	Cedarburg High School	Cedarburg, WI
G	11	Mike McCall Jr.	6 ft 0 in (1.83 m)	180 lb (82 kg)	Jr	Foreman	Chicago, IL
G	15	Sean Duff	6 ft 2 in (1.88 m)	180 lb (82 kg)	Jr	St. Francis Borgia Regional High School	St. Louis, MO
F	21	Dwayne Evans	6 ft 5 in (1.96 m)	230 lb (104 kg)	Jr	Neuqua Valley	Bolingbrook, IL
F	22	Jared Drew	6 ft 4 in (1.93 m)	205 lb (93 kg)	Fr	Cathedral	Indianapolis, IN
F	24	Cody Ellis	6 ft 8 in (2.03 m)	245 lb (111 kg)	Sr	Institute of Sport	Perth, AUS
F	30	Jake Barnett	6 ft 5 in (1.96 m)	195 lb (88 kg)	Jr	Wauwatosa East	Wauwatosa, WI
F	32	Cory Remekun	6 ft 8 in (2.03 m)	220 lb (100 kg)	Sr	Mesquite	Dallas, TX
F	51	Robert Loe	6 ft 11 in (2.11 m)	245 lb (111 kg)	Jr	Westlake Boys High School	Auckland, NZ
C	54	John Manning	6 ft 11 in (2.11 m)	240 lb (109 kg)	So	Chantilly	Chantilly, VA

Head coach

- Rick Majerus (Marquette)
  Medical leave of absence

Assistant coach(es)

- Jim Whitesell (Luther)
  Associate head coach
- Jim Crews (Indiana)
  Interim Head Coach
- Tanner Bronson (Wisconsin)
- Jim Platt (Concordia–Chicago)

Legend

- (C) Team captain
- (S) Suspended
- (I) Ineligible
- (W) Walk-on
- Injured
- Current redshirt

Roster
Last update: 29 July 2012

== Schedule ==
Date time, TV	Rank^{#}	Opponent^{#}	Result	Record	High points	High rebounds	High assists	Site (attendance) city, state
Exhibition
Nov. 03*; 2:00 pm		Rockhurst	W 79–47	0-0	14 – McCall Jr.	7 – Remekun	4 – Jett	Chaifetz Arena (N/A); Saint Louis, MO
Regular season
Nov. 09*; 7:00 pm		USC Upstate; CBE Hall of Fame Classic	W 76–59	1–0	21 – Evans	8 – Evans	5 – Jett	Chaifetz Arena (6,958); Saint Louis, MO
Nov. 14*; 7:00 pm, FSMW		Santa Clara; CBE Hall of Fame Classic	L 62–74	1–1	13 – Loe	8 – Evans	6 – McCall Jr.	Chaifetz Arena (5,058); Saint Louis, MO
Nov. 19*; 6:30 pm, ESPNU		vs. Texas A&M; CBE Hall of Fame Classic	W 70–49	2–1	21 – Evans	7 – Ellis	8 – Jett	Sprint Center (N/A); Kansas City, MO
Nov. 20*; 8:30 pm, ESPN2		vs. No. 12 Kansas; CBE Hall of Fame Classic	L 59–73	2–2	19 – Ellis	11 – Evans	3 – McCall Jr.	Sprint Center (10,315); Kansas City, MO
Nov. 24*; 7:00 pm		Southern Illinois	W 61–51	3–2	14 – Evans	6 – Remekun, Evans	8 – McCall Jr.	Chaifetz Arena (6,340); Saint Louis, MO
Nov. 28*; 11:00 pm, P12N		at Washington	L 61–66	3–3	14 – Ellis	6 – Evans	6 – McCall Jr., Jett	Alaska Airlines Arena (6,928); Seattle, WA
Dec. 02*; 3:30 pm, FSMW		Valparaiso	W 62–49	4–3	17 – Evans	6 – Jett	7 – Jett	Chaifetz Arena (6,357); St. Louis, MO
Dec. 05*; 7:00 pm, FSMW		North Texas	W 67–63	5–3	17 – Jett, Ellis	6 – Ellis	7 – McCall Jr.	Chaifetz Arena (4,817); St. Louis, MO
Dec. 15*; 7:00 pm		Tennessee–Martin	W 73–51	6–3	17 – Jett	9 – Evans	4 – Jett	Chaifetz Arena (6,197); Saint Louis, MO
Dec. 19*; 7:00 pm, FSMW		Eastern Illinois	W 72–45	7–3	13 – McCall Jr.	5 – Evans, Glaze	4 – Evans	Chaifetz Arena (5,072); Saint Louis, MO
Dec. 22*; 2:30 pm, FSMW		Loyola Marymount	W 65–44	8–3	14 – McCall Jr.	9 – Evans	5 – Jett	Chaifetz Arena (5,804); Saint Louis, MO
Dec. 28*; 7:00 pm, FSMW		SIU Edwardsville	W 68–41	9–3	16 – McCall Jr.	10 – Remekun	5 – Mitchell, Jett	Chaifetz Arena (8,175); Saint Louis, MO
Dec. 31*; 6:30 pm, CBSSN		No. 20 New Mexico	W 60–46	10–3	15 – Remekun	8 – Evans	5 – Jett	Chaifetz Arena (6,782); Saint Louis, MO
Jan. 04*; 7:00 pm		Savannah State	W 67–59	11–3	16 – McCall Jr.	7 – Remekun	4 – Mitchell	Chaifetz Arena (6,543); Saint Louis, MO
Jan. 10; 8:00 pm, CBSSN		Massachusetts	W 70–62	12–3 (1–0)	20 – Loe	9 – Remekun	4 – Evans	Chaifetz Arena (8,462); Saint Louis, MO
Jan. 12; 5:00 pm, ESPNU		at Temple	L 54–64	12–4 (1–1)	17 – Loe	13 – Evans	3 – Jett, McCall Jr.	Liacouras Center (5,735); Philadelphia, PA
Jan. 19; 7:00 pm		Rhode Island	L 80–82 ^{OT}	12–5 (1–2)	29 – Mitchell	7 – Loe	7 – Mitchell	Chaifetz Arena (8,693); Saint Louis, MO
Jan. 23; 6:00 pm		at Duquesne	W 73–64	13–5 (2–2)	16 – Ellis	11 – Glaze	6 – Mitchell	Palumbo Center (2,702); Pittsburgh, PA
Jan. 26; 3:00 pm, FSMW+		at St. Bonaventure	W 67–57	14–5 (3–2)	18 – Evans	8 – Evans	3 – Jett	Reilly Center (4,839); St. Bonaventure, NY
Jan. 31; 8:00 pm, CBSSN		No. 9 Butler	W 75–58	15–5 (4–2)	19 – Jett	5 – Evans, Ellis	3 – Ellis	Chaifetz Arena (10,612); Saint Louis, MO
Feb. 02; 1:00 pm, NBCSN		Dayton	W 81–52	16–5 (5–2)	17 – Loe	7 – Evans	6 – Jett	Chaifetz Arena (9,548); Saint Louis, MO
Feb. 06; 7:00 pm, CBSSN		at Fordham	W 90–73	17–5 (6–2)	24 – Evans	10 – Evans	6 – McCall Jr.	Rose Hill Gymnasium (2,006); The Bronx, NY
Feb. 09; 5:00 pm, KPLR-TV		at Richmond	W 56–46	18–5 (7–2)	11 – Evans	11 – Evans	2 – Evans, Jett	Robins Center (8,121); Richmond, VA
Feb. 16; 6:00 pm, FSMW		Charlotte	W 75–58	19–5 (8–2)	18 – Ellis	7 – Evans	5 – McCall Jr.	Chaifetz Arena (10,052); Saint Louis, MO
Feb. 19; 8:00 pm, CBSSN		No. 24 VCU	W 76–62	20–5 (9–2)	16 – Jett	8 – Evans	3 – Loe	Chaifetz Arena (10,027); Saint Louis, MO
Feb. 22; 6:00 pm, ESPNU		at No. 15 Butler	W 65–61	21–5 (10–2)	18 – McCall Jr.	6 – Loe	3 – Glaze, Jett	Hinkle Fieldhouse (10,000); Indianapolis, IN
Feb. 27; 7:00 pm, CBSSN	No. 18	Saint Joseph's	W 70–53	22–5 (11–2)	21 – Evans	12 – Evans	5 – McCall Jr.	Chaifetz Arena (10,012); Saint Louis, MO
Mar. 02; 3:00 pm, FSMW+	No. 18	at George Washington	W 66–58	23–5 (12–2)	22 – Evans	12 – Evans	3 – Jett	Smith Center (3,258); Washington, D.C.
Mar. 06; 8:00 pm, FSMW	No. 16	at Xavier	L 66–77 ^{OT}	23–6 (12–3)	17 – Mitchell	9 – Evans	2 – Evans	Cintas Center (9,722); Cincinnati, OH
Mar. 09; 12:30 pm, NBCSN	No. 16	La Salle	W 78–54	24–6 (13–3)	20 – Loe	17 – Evans	6 – Mitchell	Chaifetz Arena (10,272); Saint Louis, MO
2013 Atlantic 10 tournament
Mar. 15; 11:00 am	(1) No. 16	vs. (9) Charlotte; Quarterfinals	W 72–55	25–6	25 – Evans	9 – Evans	4 – Loe, McCall Jr., Mitchell	Barclays Center (N/A); Brooklyn, NY
Mar. 16; 12:30 pm, CBSSN	(1) No. 16	vs. (5) Butler; Semifinals	W 67–56	26–6	24 – Evans	11 – Evans	5 – Mitchell	Barclays Center (N/A); Brooklyn, NY
Mar. 17; 12:00 pm, CBS	(1) No. 16	vs. (2) No. 25 VCU; Championship Game	W 62–56	27–6	19 – Mitchell	8 – Evans, Loe	4 – McCall Jr.	Barclays Center (N/A); Brooklyn, NY
2013 NCAA tournament
Mar. 21*; 1:10 pm, TNT	(4 MW) No. 13	vs. (13 MW) New Mexico State; First Round	W 64–44	28–6	24 – Evans	6 – Evans, Ellis, Remekun	7 – Jett	HP Pavilion (16,836); San Jose, CA
Mar. 23*; 6:10 pm, TBS	(4 MW) No. 13	vs. (12 MW) No. 25 Oregon; Second Round	L 57–74	28–7	18 – Mitchell	9 – Evans	3 – Loe, McCall Jr., Mitchell	HP Pavilion (18,030); San Jose, CA
*Non-conference game. ^{#}Rankings from AP Poll. (#) Tournament seedings in parentheses. All times are in Central Time. (#) during NCAA Tournament is seed with Region MW=Midwest.

== Rankings ==
Ranking movement Legend: ██ Improvement in ranking. ██ Decrease in ranking. RV=Others receiving votes.
Poll	Pre	Wk 2	Wk 3	Wk 4	Wk 5	Wk 6	Wk 7	Wk 8	Wk 9	Wk 10	Wk 11	Wk 12	Wk 13	Wk 14	Wk 15	Wk 16	Wk 17	Wk 18	Wk 19	Final
AP	RV	RV													RV	RV	RV	18	16	16
Coaches	RV	RV												RV	RV	RV	RV	19	15	16

== Preseason ==
The Billikens garnered buzz as one of the preseason favorites to win their conference. "[T]he only major loss is 6-foot-6 forward Brian Conklin, the team's leading scorer. But everyone else of note -- point guard Kwamain Mitchell, off-guards Mike McCall and Jordair Jett, swingman Dwayne Evans, forward Cody Ellis -- is back. Meanwhile, 6-11 forward Rob Loe looks capable of stepping into a bigger role in the frontcourt in his junior season."

=== Departures ===
Name	Number	Pos.	Height	Weight	Year	Hometown	Notes
Brian Conklin	14	F	6'6"	230	Senior	Eugene, OR	Graduated
Kyle Cassity	23	G	6'4"	200	Senior	Tamaroa, IL	Graduated
