= 2012–13 Rhode Island Rams men's basketball team =

American college basketball season

2012–13 Rhode Island Rams men's basketball
- Conference: Atlantic 10 Conference
- Record: 8–21 (3–13 A-10)
- Head coach: Dan Hurley (1st season)
- Assistant coaches: Bobby Hurley; Preston Murphy; Jim Carr
- Home arena: Ryan Center

2012–13 Atlantic 10 men's basketball standings
	Conf.				Overall
Team	W		L	PCT	W		L	PCT
No. 16 Saint Louis †	13	–	3	.813	28	–	7	.800
No. 25 VCU	12	–	4	.750	27	–	9	.750
Butler	11	–	5	.688	27	–	9	.750
La Salle	11	–	5	.688	24	–	10	.706
Temple	11	–	5	.688	24	–	10	.706
UMass	9	–	7	.563	21	–	12	.636
Xavier	9	–	7	.563	17	–	14	.548
Charlotte	8	–	8	.500	21	–	12	.636
Saint Joseph's	8	–	8	.500	18	–	14	.563
Richmond	8	–	8	.500	19	–	15	.559
Dayton	7	–	9	.438	17	–	14	.548
St. Bonaventure	7	–	9	.438	14	–	15	.483
George Washington	7	–	9	.438	13	–	17	.433
Rhode Island	3	–	13	.188	8	–	21	.276
Fordham	3	–	13	.188	7	–	24	.226
Duquesne	1	–	15	.063	8	–	22	.267
† 2013 Atlantic 10 Tournament winner As of March 28, 2013; Rankings from AP Poll

The 2012–13 Rhode Island Rams basketball team represented the University of Rhode Island during the 2012–13 NCAA Division I men's basketball season. The Rams, led by first year head coach Dan Hurley, played their home games at the Ryan Center and were members of the Atlantic 10 Conference. They finished the season 8–21, 3–13 in A-10 play finish in a tie for 14th place. They failed to qualify for the Atlantic 10 tournament.

== Roster ==
Number	Name	Position	Height	Weight	Year	Hometown
0	Alwayne Bigby	Guard/Forward	6–5	210	Graduate	Toronto, Ontario, Canada
1	Mike Powell	Guard	5–11	175	Sophomore	Chicago, Illinois
2	Jarelle Reischel	Forward	6–6	215	Sophomore	Frankfurt, Germany
4	Jordan Hare	Forward	6–10	205	Freshman	Saginaw, Michigan
5	Xavier Munford	Guard	6–2	180	Junior	Hillside, New Jersey
10	DeShon Minnis	Guard	6–3	185	Sophomore	Philadelphia, Pennsylvania
12	Andre Malone	Guard	6–6	210	Senior	Atlanta, Georgia
13	T. J. Buchanan	Guard	6–3	195	Sophomore	Kalamazoo, Michigan
14	Ifeyani Onyekaba	Forward	6–8	240	Freshman	Abuja, Nigeria
20	Eric Youncofski	Guard	5–10	150	Freshman	Middletown Township, New Jersey
23	Nikola Malesevic	Forward	6–7	200	Senior	Užice, Serbia
30	Shane Plunkett	Guard	6–3	195	Freshman	Brookville, New York
33	Ryan Brooks	Forward	6–8	220	Senior	Mays Landing, New Jersey
34	Mike Aaman	Forward	6–8	210	Freshman	Hazlet, New Jersey
55	Gilvydas Biruta	Forward	6–8	245	Junior	Jonava, Lithuania

== Schedule ==
Date time, TV	Opponent	Result	Record	Site (attendance) city, state
Exhibition
11/02/2012*; 7:00 pm	Coast Guard	W 83–31	–	Ryan Center (3,210); Kingston, RI
Regular season
11/09/2012*; 7:30 pm	Norfolk State; Hall of Fame Tip-Off Classic	L 55–67	0–1	Ryan Center (5,045); Kingston, RI
11/12/2012*; 7:00 pm, ESPN3	at Virginia Tech	L 50–69	0–2	Cassell Coliseum (6,270); Blacksburg, VA
11/17/2012*; 5:00 pm, ESPN3	vs. No. 4 Ohio State; Hall of Fame Tip-Off Classic semifinals	L 58–69	0–3	Mohegan Sun Arena (6,003); Uncasville, CT
11/18/2012*; 7:30 pm, ESPN3	vs. Seton Hall; Hall of Fame Tip-Off Classic 3rd place	L 55–60	0–4	Mohegan Sun Arena (3,863); Uncasville, CT
11/23/2012*; 7:00 pm	Loyola (MD); Hall of Fame Tip-Off Classic	L 54–58 ^{OT}	0–5	Ryan Center (3,614); Kingston, RI
11/25/2012*; 4:00 pm	at Auburn	W 78–72 ^{2OT}	1–5	Auburn Arena (4,557); Auburn, AL
11/28/2012*; 8:00 pm, CBSSN	George Mason	L 52–55	1–6	Ryan Center (4,056); Kingston, RI
12/01/2012*; 2:00 pm	Vermont	W 76–66	2–6	Ryan Center (4,126); Kingston, RI
12/06/2012*; 7:00 pm, Cox Sports	at Providence; Ocean State Cup	L 57–72	2–7	Dunkin' Donuts Center (9,344); Providence, RI
12/15/2012*; 2:00 pm	SMU	W 72–50	3–7	Ryan Center (3,822); Kingston, RI
12/22/2012*; 2:00 pm	Georgia State	W 65–60	4–7	Ryan Center (3,822); Kingston, RI
12/27/2012*; 10:00 pm	at Saint Mary's	L 59–82	4–8	McKeon Pavilion (2,783); Moraga, CA
01/04/2013*; 7:00 pm, OSN	Brown; Ocean State Cup	W 59–47	5–8	Ryan Center (3,858); Kingston, RI
01/09/2013; 7:00 pm	at Richmond	L 61–64	5–9 (0–1)	Robins Center (4,024); Richmond, Virginia
01/12/2013; 2:00 pm	Charlotte	L 50–58	5–10 (0–2)	Ryan Center (3,758); Kingston, RI
01/19/2013; 8:00 pm	at Saint Louis	W 82–80 ^{OT}	6–10 (1–2)	Chaifetz Arena (8,693); Saint Louis, MO
01/23/2013; 7:00 pm	George Washington	L 65–66	6–11 (1–3)	Ryan Center (4,111); Kingston, RI
01/26/2013; 1:00 pm	at Fordham	L 63–66	6–12 (1–4)	Rose Hill Gymnasium (3,014); Bronx, NY
01/30/2013; 7:00 pm	VCU	L 64–70	6–13 (1–5)	Ryan Center (6,632); Kingston, RI
02/02/2013; 4:00 pm, CBSSN	at No. 9 Butler	L 68–75	6–14 (1–6)	Hinkle Fieldhouse (10,000); Indianapolis, IN
02/06/2013; 7:00 pm	at Massachusetts	L 53–81	6–15 (1–7)	William D. Mullins Memorial Center (4,124); Amherst, MA
02/09/2013; 7:00 pm	St. Bonaventure	L 61–67	6–16 (1–8)	Ryan Center (1,933); Kingston, RI
02/13/2013; 7:00 pm	Dayton	W 75–72	7–16 (2–8)	Ryan Center (3,388); Kingston, RI
02/16/2013; 7:00 pm	at Duquesne	W 67–62	8–16 (3–8)	A. J. Palumbo Center (2,632); Pittsburgh, PA
02/20/2013; 7:00 pm	Xavier	L 42–55	8–17 (3–9)	Ryan Center (6,154); Kingston, RI
02/24/2013; 2:00 pm	La Salle	L 65–72	8–18 (3–10)	Ryan Center (5,180); Kingston, RI
03/02/2013; 2:00 pm	at Temple	L 70–76	8–19 (3–11)	Liacouras Center (9,493); Philadelphia, PA
03/06/2013; 7:00 pm	at Saint Joseph's	L 44–81	8–20 (3–12)	Hagan Arena (3,743); Philadelphia, PA
03/09/2013; 2:00 pm	Massachusetts	L 66–75	8–21 (3–13)	Ryan Center (4,869); Kingston, RI
*Non-conference game. ^{#}Rankings from AP Poll. (#) Tournament seedings in parentheses. All times are in Eastern Time..
