= 2012–13 Dayton Flyers men's basketball team =

American college basketball season

2012–13 Dayton Flyers men's basketball
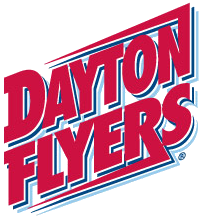
- Conference: Atlantic 10 Conference
- Record: 17–14 (7–9 A-10)
- Head coach: Archie Miller (2nd season)
- Assistant coaches: Kevin Kuwik; Allen Griffin; Tom Ostrom
- Home arena: University of Dayton Arena

2012–13 Atlantic 10 men's basketball standings
	Conf.				Overall
Team	W		L	PCT	W		L	PCT
No. 16 Saint Louis †	13	–	3	.813	28	–	7	.800
No. 25 VCU	12	–	4	.750	27	–	9	.750
Butler	11	–	5	.688	27	–	9	.750
La Salle	11	–	5	.688	24	–	10	.706
Temple	11	–	5	.688	24	–	10	.706
UMass	9	–	7	.563	21	–	12	.636
Xavier	9	–	7	.563	17	–	14	.548
Charlotte	8	–	8	.500	21	–	12	.636
Saint Joseph's	8	–	8	.500	18	–	14	.563
Richmond	8	–	8	.500	19	–	15	.559
Dayton	7	–	9	.438	17	–	14	.548
St. Bonaventure	7	–	9	.438	14	–	15	.483
George Washington	7	–	9	.438	13	–	17	.433
Rhode Island	3	–	13	.188	8	–	21	.276
Fordham	3	–	13	.188	7	–	24	.226
Duquesne	1	–	15	.063	8	–	22	.267
† 2013 Atlantic 10 Tournament winner As of March 28, 2013; Rankings from AP Poll

The 2012–13 Dayton Flyers men's basketball team represented the University of Dayton during the 2012–13 NCAA Division I men's basketball season. The Flyers, led by second year head coach Archie Miller, played their home games at the University of Dayton Arena and were members of the Atlantic 10 Conference. They finished the season 17–14, 7–9 in A-10 play to finish in a three way tie for 11th place. They lost in the first round of the Atlantic 10 tournament to Butler.

== Roster ==
2012–13 Dayton Flyers men's basketball team
Players
Coaches

Pos.	#	Name	Height	Weight	Year	Previous school	Hometown
G	0	Khari Price	5 ft 11 in (1.8 m)	170 lb (77 kg)	Fr	Salmen	Slidell, LA
G	1	Kevin Dillard	6 ft 0 in (1.83 m)	182 lb (83 kg)	Sr	Homewood-Flossmoor	Homewood, IL
F/C	2	Josh Benson	6 ft 9 in (2.06 m)	228 lb (103 kg)	Sr	Dunbar	Dayton, OH
F	3	Mitch Asmus	6 ft 5 in (1.96 m)	195 lb (88 kg)	Jr	Okemos	Okemos, MI
F	5	Devin Oliver	6 ft 7 in (2.01 m)	225 lb (102 kg)	Jr	Kalamazoo Central	Kalamazoo, MI
F/C	12	Jalen Robinson	6 ft 9 in (2.06 m)	243 lb (110 kg)	Fr	Northland	Columbus, OH
F	15	Matt Derenbecker	6 ft 7 in (2.01 m)	215 lb (98 kg)	So	Metairie Park Country Day	Metairie, LA
F	21	Dyshawn Pierre	6 ft 6 in (1.98 m)	210 lb (95 kg)	Fr	Anderson CVI	Whitby, ONT
G	23	Brian Vonderhaar	6 ft 0 in (1.83 m)	170 lb (77 kg)	Sr	Moeller	Cincinnati, OH
G	24	Dennis Williams	6 ft 4 in (1.93 m)	180 lb (82 kg)	Jr	Wilde Lake	Columbia, MD
F	25	Alex Gavrilovic	6 ft 9 in (2.06 m)	246 lb (112 kg)	So	IMG Academy	Strasbourg, FRA
F/C	35	Matt Kavanaugh (S)	6 ft 9 in (2.06 m)	250 lb (113 kg)	Sr	Centerville	Centerville, OH
F/C	40	Devon Scott	6 ft 9 in (2.06 m)	215 lb (98 kg)	Fr	Northland	Columbus, OH
G	43	Vee Sanford	6 ft 3 in (1.91 m)	196 lb (89 kg)	Jr	Lexington Catholic	Lexington, KY
G		Jordan Sibert (redshirt)	6 ft 4 in (1.93 m)	187 lb (85 kg)	RS So	Princeton	Cincinnati, OH

Head coach

- Archie Miller (NC State)

Assistant coach(es)

- Kevin Kuwik (Notre Dame)
- Allen Griffin (Syracuse)
- Tom Ostrom (Minnesota)

Legend

- (C) Team captain
- (S) Suspended
- (I) Ineligible
- (W) Walk-on
- Injured
- Current redshirt

Roster
Last update: 01 August 2012

== Schedule ==
Date time, TV	Opponent	Result	Record	High points	High rebounds	High assists	Site (attendance) city, state
Exhibition
Oct. 27*; 2:00 pm	Findlay	W 77–58		19 – Robinson	10 – Robinson	7 – Dillard	UD Arena (10,818); Dayton, OH
Nov. 04*; 7:00 pm	Walsh	W 81–63		22 – Benson	12 – Benson	9 – Dillard	UD Arena (10,887); Dayton, OH
Regular season
Nov. 10*; 2:00 pm	Arkansas State	W 74–61	1–0	18 – Sanford	8 – Benson	10 – Dillard	UD Arena (12,265); Dayton, OH
Nov. 15*; 12:30 pm, ESPN3	vs. Colorado; Charleston Classic Quarterfinals	L 57–67	1–1	13 – Sanford	12 – Oliver	3 – Dillard	TD Arena (1,381); Charleston, SC
Nov. 16*; 3:00 pm, ESPNU	vs. Boston College; Charleston Classic consolation	W 87–71	2–1	23 – Pierre	8 – Oliver, Sanford	6 – Sanford	TD Arena (3,177); Charleston, SC
Nov. 18*; 2:00 pm, ESPN3	vs. Auburn; Charleston Classic 5th place game	W 73–63	3–1	20 – Dillard	7 – Robinson	3 – Dillard, Price	TD Arena (4,262); Charleston, SC
Nov. 24*; 2:00 pm, WHIO	Manhattan	W 66–58	4–1	20 – Dillard	12 – Oliver	3 – Pierre, Dillard	UD Arena (11,482); Dayton, OH
Nov. 28*; 7:00 pm, WHIO	Weber State	L 61–62	4–2	18 – Dillard	9 – Oliver, Benson	4 – Dillard	UD Arena (12,176); Dayton, OH
Dec. 01*; 8:00 pm, WHIO	Northern Illinois	W 60–43	5–2	12 – Oliver, Benson	6 – Oliver	3 – Dillard, Sanford, Price	UD Arena (12,637); Dayton, OH
Dec. 05*; 9:00 pm, CSS/ESPN3	at Alabama	W 81–76	6–2	25 – Dillard	7 – Oliver	6 – Dillard	Coleman Coliseum (11,460); Tuscaloosa, AL
Dec. 08*; 8:00 pm, WHIO	Miami (OH)	W 83–61	7–2	15 – Oliver, Dillard	12 – Benson	6 – Oliver	UD Arena (12,562); Dayton, OH
Dec. 15*; 7:00 pm, WHIO	Florida Atlantic	W 81–56	8–2	15 – Derenbecker	14 – Oliver, Robinson	5 – Price	UD Arena (11,553); Dayton, OH
Dec. 19*; 7:00 pm, WHIO	Illinois State	L 73–74	8–3	14 – Pierre, Dillard	6 – Benson	3 – Dillard	UD Arena (11,879); Dayton, OH
Dec. 22*; 12:00 pm, CBSSN	Murray State	W 77–68	9–3	23 – Sanford	11 – Oliver	10 – Dillard	UD Arena (12,638); Dayton, OH
Dec. 30*; 7:00 pm, Pac-12	at USC	L 61–63 ^{OT}	9–4	13 – Dillard	12 – Oliver	4 – Dillard	Galen Center (4,113); Los Angeles, CA
Jan. 05*; 7:00 pm, WHIO	UAB	W 78–71	10–4	20 – Benson	8 – Benson	10 – Dillard	UD Arena (12,455); Dayton, OH
Jan. 09; 7:00 pm, WHIO	at VCU	L 62–74	10–5 (0–1)	17 – Dillard	11 – Oliver	5 – Oliver	Siegel Center (7,693); Richmond, VA
Jan. 12; 2:00 pm, NBCSN	No. 14 Butler	L 73–79	10–6 (0–2)	14 – Pierre, Sanford	13 – Oliver	3 – Pierre, Dillard	UD Arena (13,455); Dayton, OH
Jan. 16; 7:00 pm, FSOH	at La Salle	L 70–72	10–7 (0–3)	13 – Sanford, Pierre	9 – Pierre	6 – Pierre	Tom Gola Arena (2,012); Philadelphia, PA
Jan. 23; 7:00 pm, WHIO	Fordham	W 96–51	11–7 (1–3)	22 – Dillard	9 – Robinson	8 – Dillard	UD Arena (12,131); Dayton, OH
Jan. 26; 4:00 pm, CBSSNR	Duquesne	W 72–56	12–7 (2–3)	17 – Benson	10 – Oliver	7 – Dillard	UD Arena (12,438); Dayton, OH
Jan. 30; 9:00 pm, CBSSN	at Xavier	L 61–66	12–8 (2–4)	16 – Sanford	6 – Oliver	5 – Dillard	Cintas Center (10,250); Cincinnati, OH
Feb. 02; 2:00 pm, NBCSN	at Saint Louis	L 52–81	12–9 (2–5)	12 – Benson	6 – Benson	3 – Pierre	Chaifetz Arena (9,548); Saint Louis, MO
Feb. 06; 7:00 pm, CBSSNR	Saint Joseph's	W 60–54	13–9 (3–5)	23 – Dillard	12 – Oliver	3 – Oliver, Pierre, Dillard	UD Arena (12,453); Dayton, OH
Feb. 09; 11:00 am, ESPNU	Temple	L 71–72	13–10 (3–6)	16 – Dillard	12 – Oliver	5 – Dillard	UD Arena (12,871); Dayton, OH
Feb. 13; 7:00 pm	at Rhode Island	L 72–75	13–11 (3–7)	15 – Pierre, Dillard	10 – Pierre	5 – Dillard	Ryan Center (3,388); Kingston, RI
Feb. 16; 12:00 pm, ESPN2	Xavier	W 70–59	14–11 (4–7)	17 – Dillard	7 – Robinson	4 – Dillard	UD Arena (13,435); Dayton, OH
Feb. 23; 1:00 pm	at Massachusetts	L 66–76	14–12 (4–8)	14 – Sanford	8 – Pierre	6 – Dillard	Mullins Center (6,096); Amherst, MA
Feb. 27; 7:30 pm, WHIO	at Charlotte	W 88–67	15–12 (5–8)	16 – Oliver	11 – Oliver	5 – Sanford	Dale F. Halton Arena (5,113); Charlotte, NC
Mar. 02; 4:00 pm, CBSSNR	Richmond	W 78–74	16–12 (6–8)	21 – Dillard	10 – Oliver	5 – Pierre	UD Arena (12,317); Dayton, OH
Mar. 06; 7:00 pm, CBSSNR	St. Bonaventure	W 75–63	17–12 (7–8)	18 – Dillard	7 – Scott	8 – Dillard	UD Arena (12,162); Dayton, OH
Mar. 09; 2:00 pm, CBSSNR	at George Washington	L 80–81 ^{OT}	17–13 (7–9)	21 – Pierre	7 – Pierre	4 – Dillard	Smith Center (3,421); Washington, D.C.
Atlantic 10 tournament
Mar. 14; 2:48 pm	vs. Butler; First Round	L 67–73	17–14	18 – Benson	9 – Robinson	2 – Pierre, Dillard, Sanford	Barclays Center (N/A); Brooklyn, NY
*Non-conference game. ^{#}Rankings from AP Poll/Coaches' Poll. (#) Tournament seedings in parentheses. All times are in Eastern Time..
