= 2013 Atlantic 10 men's basketball tournament =

- Classification: Division I
- Season: 2012–13
- Teams: 12
- Site: Barclays Center; Brooklyn, New York
- Champions: Saint Louis (1st title)
- Winning coach: Jim Crews (1st title)
- MVP: Dwayne Evans (Saint Louis)
- Television: NBCSN, CBSSN, CBS

2012–13 Atlantic 10 men's basketball standings
	Conf.				Overall
Team	W		L	PCT	W		L	PCT
No. 16 Saint Louis †	13	–	3	.813	28	–	7	.800
No. 25 VCU	12	–	4	.750	27	–	9	.750
Butler	11	–	5	.688	27	–	9	.750
La Salle	11	–	5	.688	24	–	10	.706
Temple	11	–	5	.688	24	–	10	.706
UMass	9	–	7	.563	21	–	12	.636
Xavier	9	–	7	.563	17	–	14	.548
Charlotte	8	–	8	.500	21	–	12	.636
Saint Joseph's	8	–	8	.500	18	–	14	.563
Richmond	8	–	8	.500	19	–	15	.559
Dayton	7	–	9	.438	17	–	14	.548
St. Bonaventure	7	–	9	.438	14	–	15	.483
George Washington	7	–	9	.438	13	–	17	.433
Rhode Island	3	–	13	.188	8	–	21	.276
Fordham	3	–	13	.188	7	–	24	.226
Duquesne	1	–	15	.063	8	–	22	.267
† 2013 Atlantic 10 Tournament winner As of March 28, 2013; Rankings from AP Poll

The 2013 Atlantic 10 men's basketball tournament was played on March 14–17 at the Barclays Center in Brooklyn. The top 12 teams in the final standings qualified for the tournament, The 2013 championship game was nationally televised on CBS. As the tournament champion, Saint Louis received the Atlantic 10 Conference's automatic bid to the 2013 NCAA tournament.

== Seeds ==
The top twelve teams qualified for the tournament. Teams were seeded by record within the conference, with a tiebreaker system to seed teams with identical conference records.

Seed	School	Conf (Overall)	Tiebreaker
#1	Saint Louis	13–3 (24–6)	
#2	VCU	12–4 (24–7)	
#3	Temple	11–5 (23–8)	1–0 vs. St. Louis
#4	La Salle	11–5 (21–8)	0–1 vs. St. Louis, 1–0 vs. Butler
#5	Butler	11–5 (24–7)	0–2 vs. St. Louis, 0–1 vs. La Salle
#6	Massachusetts	9–7 (19–10)	1–0 vs. Xavier
#7	Xavier	9–7 (17–13)	0–1 vs. Massachusetts
#8	Richmond	8–8 (18–13)	0–1 vs Saint Louis, 1–1 vs VCU
#9	Charlotte	8–8 (20–10)	0–1 vs. Saint Louis, 0–1 vs VCU, 1–0 vs. St. Joseph's
#10	Saint Josephs	8–8 (17–12)	0–1 vs. Saint Louis, 0–1 vs VCU, 0–1 vs. Charlotte
#11	George Washington	7–9 (13–16)	2–0 vs. Dayton + St Bonaventure
#12	Dayton	7–9 (17–13)	1–1 vs. George Washington + St Bonaventure
	St. Bonaventure	7–9 (14–15)	0–2 vs. Dayton + George Washington

Eliminated from Conference tournament: St. Bonaventure (7–9), Rhode Island (3–13), Fordham (3–13), Duquesne (1–15)

== Bracket ==
First round Thursday, March 14, 2013; NBC Sports Network
8	Richmond	63
9	Charlotte	68
5	Butler	73
12	Dayton	67
7	Xavier	57
10	St. Joseph's	58
6	Massachusetts	77
11	George Washington	72

Quarterfinals; Friday, March 15, 2013; Comcast SportsNet (Regional)
1	#16 Saint Louis	72
9	Charlotte	55
4	La Salle	58
5	Butler	69
2	#25 VCU	82
10	St. Joseph's	79
3	Temple	74
6	Massachusetts	79

Semi-finals; Saturday, March 16, 2013; CBS Sports Network
1	#16 Saint Louis	67
5	Butler	56
2	#25 VCU	71
6	Massachusetts	62

Championship; Sunday, March 17, 2013; CBS
1	#16 Saint Louis	62
2	#25 VCU	56

All times listed are Eastern
