= 2012–13 UMass Minutemen basketball team =

American college basketball season

2012–13 UMass Minutemen men's basketball

NIT, First Round
- Conference: Atlantic 10 Conference
- Record: 21–12 (9–7 A-10)
- Head coach: Derek Kellogg (5th season)
- Assistant coaches: Shyrone Chatman; Adam Ginsburg; Antwon Jackson
- Home arena: William D. Mullins Memorial Center

2012–13 Atlantic 10 men's basketball standings
	Conf.				Overall
Team	W		L	PCT	W		L	PCT
No. 16 Saint Louis †	13	–	3	.813	28	–	7	.800
No. 25 VCU	12	–	4	.750	27	–	9	.750
Butler	11	–	5	.688	27	–	9	.750
La Salle	11	–	5	.688	24	–	10	.706
Temple	11	–	5	.688	24	–	10	.706
UMass	9	–	7	.563	21	–	12	.636
Xavier	9	–	7	.563	17	–	14	.548
Charlotte	8	–	8	.500	21	–	12	.636
Saint Joseph's	8	–	8	.500	18	–	14	.563
Richmond	8	–	8	.500	19	–	15	.559
Dayton	7	–	9	.438	17	–	14	.548
St. Bonaventure	7	–	9	.438	14	–	15	.483
George Washington	7	–	9	.438	13	–	17	.433
Rhode Island	3	–	13	.188	8	–	21	.276
Fordham	3	–	13	.188	7	–	24	.226
Duquesne	1	–	15	.063	8	–	22	.267
† 2013 Atlantic 10 Tournament winner As of March 28, 2013; Rankings from AP Poll

The 2012–13 UMass Minutemen basketball team represented the University of Massachusetts Amherst during the 2012–13 NCAA Division I men's basketball season. The Minutemen, led by fifth year head coach Derek Kellogg, played their home games at the William D. Mullins Memorial Center and were members of the Atlantic 10 Conference. They finished the season 21–12, 9–7 in A-10 play to finish in a tie for sixth place. They advanced to the semifinals of the Atlantic 10 tournament where they lost to VCU. They were invited to the 2013 NIT as the highest A-10 team not to go to the NCAA Tournament, where they lost in the first round to Stony Brook.

== Roster ==
Number	Name	Position	Height	Weight	Year	Hometown
0	Javorn Farrell	Guard/Forward	6–5	215	Senior	Woodbridge, Virginia
1	Maxie Esho	Forward	6–8	205	RS Sophomore	Upper Marlboro, Maryland
2	Derrick Gordon	Guard	6–3	190	Sophomore	Plainfield, New Jersey
3	Chaz Williams	Guard	5–9	175	RS Junior	Brooklyn, New York
5	Jesse Morgan	Guard	6–5	190	Junior	Philadelphia, Pennsylvania
11	Tyler Bergantino	Forward/Center	6–9	215	Freshman	Spring Hill, Florida
12	Trey Davis	Guard	6–0	180	Freshman	DeSoto, Texas
22	Sampson Carter	Forward	6–8	220	RS Junior	Baton Rouge, Louisiana
23	Freddie Riley	Guard	6–5	190	Senior	Ocala, Florida
25	Cady Lalanne	Forward/Center	6–9	250	Sophomore	Orlando, Florida
33	Terrell Vinson	Forward	6–7	220	Senior	Baltimore, Maryland
34	Raphiael Putney	Forward	6–9	185	RS Junior	Woodbridge, Virginia
55	Izzy Freeman	Center	7–0	205	Freshman	Manassas, Virginia

== Schedule ==
Date time, TV	Rank^{#}	Opponent^{#}	Result	Record	Site (attendance) city, state
Exhibition
11/03/2012*; 1:00 pm		American International	W 87–82	–	Mullins Center (2,169); Amherst, MA
Regular season
11/13/2012*; 10:00 am, ESPN		Harvard; ESPN College Hoops Tip-Off Marathon	W 67–64	1–0	Mullins Center (3,874); Amherst, MA
11/15/2012*; 7:30 pm, ESPNU		vs. Providence; Puerto Rico Tip-Off Quarterfinals	W 77–75	2–0	Coliseo Rubén Rodríguez (4,103); Bayamón, PR
11/16/2012*; 5:00 pm, ESPN2		vs. No. 6 NC State; Puerto Rico Tip-Off semifinals	L 76–94	2–1	Coliseo Rubén Rodríguez (N/A); Bayamón, PR
11/18/2012*; 4:00 pm, ESPNU		vs. Tennessee; Puerto Rico Tip-Off 3rd place game	L 69–83	2–2	Coliseo Rubén Rodríguez (N/A); Bayamón, PR
11/28/2012*; 7:00 pm		at Siena	W 64–63	3–2	Times Union Center (5,739); Albany, NY
12/01/2012*; 2:00 pm, CBSSN		Miami (FL)	L 62–75	3–3	Mullins Center (7,004); Amherst, MA
12/04/2012*; 7:00 pm		at Northeastern	W 72–66	4–3	Matthews Arena (2,441); Boston, MA
12/15/2012*; 12:00 pm		vs. Elon; Hall of Fame Showcase	W 78–73 ^{OT}	5–3	MassMutual Center (3,085); Springfield, MA
12/19/2012*; 7:50 pm, WSHM		Ohio	W 85–76	6–3	Mullins Center (3,821); Amherst, MA
12/22/2012*; 1:30 pm		East Carolina	W 88–81	7–3	Mullins Center (4,123); Amherst, MA
12/29/2012*; 4:00 pm		at Northern Illinois	W 64–59	8–3	Convocation Center (1,100); DeKalb, IL
01/02/2013*; 7:00 pm		at Miami (OH)	W 70–69	9–3	Millett Hall (898); Oxford, OH
01/05/2013*; 2:00 pm		Eastern Michigan	W 75–61	10–3	Mullins Center (5,060); Amherst, MA
01/10/2013; 9:00 pm, CBSSN		at Saint Louis	L 62–70	10–4 (0–1)	Chaifetz Arena (8,462); Saint Louis, MO
01/13/2013; 1:00 pm, YES		at Fordham	W 77–73	11–4 (1–1)	Rose Hill Gymnasium (2,567); Bronx, NY
01/17/2013; 7:00 pm, CBSSN		Duquesne	W 79–66	12–4 (2–1)	Mullins Center (3,421); Amherst, MA
01/19/2013; 4:00 pm		George Washington	L 76–79	12–5 (2–2)	Mullins Center (7,143); Amherst, MA
01/27/2013; 2:00 pm		Richmond	W 70–65	13–5 (3–2)	Mullins Center (5,467); Amherst, MA
01/30/2013; 7:00 pm		at La Salle	W 61–60	14–5 (4–2)	Tom Gola Arena (2,723); Philadelphia, PA
02/02/2013; 2:00 pm		at Charlotte	L 65–66	14–6 (4–3)	Halton Arena (9,105); Charlotte, NC
02/06/2013; 7:00 pm		Rhode Island	W 81–53	15–6 (5–3)	Mullins Center (4,124); Amherst, MA
02/09/2013; 7:00 pm, ESPN3		Saint Joseph's	W 80–62	16–6 (6–3)	Mullins Center (4,479); Amherst, MA
02/14/2013; 9:00 pm, CBSSN		at VCU	L 68–86	16–7 (6–4)	Stuart C. Siegel Center (7,693); Richmond, VA
02/16/2013; 6:00 pm, CBSSN		Temple	L 82–83	16–8 (6–5)	Mullins Center (7,438); Amherst, MA
02/20/2013; 7:00 pm, CBSSN		St. Bonaventure	L 94–99	16–9 (6–6)	Reilly Center (3,468); St. Bonaventure, NY
02/23/2013; 1:00 pm		at Dayton	W 76–66	17–9 (7–6)	UD Arena (6,096); Dayton, OH
03/02/2013; 2:00 pm, CBSSN		at Xavier	W 77–72	18–9 (8–6)	Cintas Center (9,633); Cincinnati, OH
03/07/2013; 7:00 pm, NBCSN		Butler	L 62–73	18–10 (8–7)	Mullins Center (9,341); Amherst, MA
03/09/2013; 2:00 pm		at Rhode Island	W 75–66	19–10 (9–7)	Ryan Center (4,869); Kingston, RI
2013 Atlantic 10 men's basketball tournament
03/14/2013; 9:00 pm, NBCSN		vs. George Washington; First Round	W 77–72	20–10	Barclays Center (5,751); Brooklyn, NY
03/15/2013; 9:25 pm, Comcast		vs. Temple; Quarterfinals	W 79–74	21–10	Barclays Center (7,384); Brooklyn, NY
03/16/2013; 4:00 pm, CBSSN		vs. No. 25 VCU; Semifinals	L 62–71	21–11	Barclays Center (N/A); Brooklyn, NY
2013 NIT
03/20/2013*; 7:15 pm, ESPN3	No. (2)	(7) Stony Brook; First Round	L 58–71	21–12	Mullins Center (2,173); Amherst, MA
*Non-conference game. ^{#}Rankings from AP Poll/Coaches' Poll. (#) Tournament seedings in parentheses. All times are in Eastern Time. (#) during NIT is seed within region.
