= Tom Parrotta =

American basketball coach (born 1966)

Current position
- Title: Assistant coach
- Team: Hofstra
- Conference: CAA

Biographical details
- Born: May 3, 1966 (age 60)

Playing career
- 1984–1988: Fordham

Coaching career (HC unless noted)
- 1994–1995: Nazareth (asst.)
- 1995–2001: Niagara (asst.)
- 2001–2006: Hofstra (asst.)
- 2006–2012: Canisius
- 2012–2015: Fordham (asst.)
- 2015–2019: Fairfield (asst.)
- 2020–2021: Columbia (asst.)
- 2021–present: Hofstra (asst.)

Head coaching record
- Overall: 64–121

Tom Parrotta (born May 3, 1966) is an American college basketball coach, currently an assistant coach at Hofstra and former head men's basketball coach at Canisius College.

Parrotta played college basketball at Fordham and played professionally in Portugal. He got his coaching start at Nazareth College after his mother spent $600 to send him to the Final Four. Parrotta was an assistant at Niagara from 1995 to 2001. He served as an assistant at Hofstra from 2001 to 2006, when he was hired at Canisius. He was fired from Canisius in 2012, after posting a 5-25 record. In 2012, Parrotta was named an assistant coach at Fordham, later joining the Fairfield staff in 2015 and Columbia in 2020. In 2021, Parrotta returned to Hofstra for his second stint as an assistant coach.
