= 2012–13 Xavier Musketeers men's basketball team =

American college basketball season

2012–13 Xavier Musketeers men's basketball
- Conference: Atlantic 10 Conference
- Record: 17–14 (9–7 A-10)
- Head coach: Chris Mack (4th season)
- Assistant coaches: Ashley Howard; Mike Pegues; Travis Steele
- Home arena: Cintas Center

2012–13 Atlantic 10 men's basketball standings
	Conf.				Overall
Team	W		L	PCT	W		L	PCT
No. 16 Saint Louis †	13	–	3	.813	28	–	7	.800
No. 25 VCU	12	–	4	.750	27	–	9	.750
Butler	11	–	5	.688	27	–	9	.750
La Salle	11	–	5	.688	24	–	10	.706
Temple	11	–	5	.688	24	–	10	.706
UMass	9	–	7	.563	21	–	12	.636
Xavier	9	–	7	.563	17	–	14	.548
Charlotte	8	–	8	.500	21	–	12	.636
Saint Joseph's	8	–	8	.500	18	–	14	.563
Richmond	8	–	8	.500	19	–	15	.559
Dayton	7	–	9	.438	17	–	14	.548
St. Bonaventure	7	–	9	.438	14	–	15	.483
George Washington	7	–	9	.438	13	–	17	.433
Rhode Island	3	–	13	.188	8	–	21	.276
Fordham	3	–	13	.188	7	–	24	.226
Duquesne	1	–	15	.063	8	–	22	.267
† 2013 Atlantic 10 Tournament winner As of March 28, 2013; Rankings from AP Poll

The 2012–13 Xavier Musketeers men's basketball team represented Xavier University during the 2012-13 NCAA Division I men's basketball season. The team was coached by Chris Mack. The Musketeers competed in the Atlantic 10 Conference and played their home games at the Cintas Center. They finished the season 17–14, 9–7 in A-10 play to finish in a tie for sixth place. They lost in the first round of the A-10 tournament to Saint Joseph's. This was the first time since the 2004–05 season that Xavier failed to make the NCAA tournament.

The season marked Xavier's final season as a member of the A-10 as they departed to join the new Big East Conference in July 2013.

== Previous season ==
The Musketeers finished the 2011–12 season with a record of 23–13, 10–6 in A-10 play finishing in a tie for third place. They lost to St. Bonaventure in the championship of the A-10 tournament. They received a bid to the NCAA tournament where they defeated Notre Dame and Lehigh before losing to Baylor in the Sweet Sixteen.

== Roster ==
2012–13 Xavier Musketeers men's basketball team
Players
Coaches

Pos.	#	Name	Height	Weight	Year	Hometown
G	0	Semaj Christon	6 ft 3 in (1.91 m)	187 lb (85 kg)	Fr	Cincinnati, Ohio
F	1	Jalen Reynolds (I)	6 ft 9 in (2.06 m)	222 lb (101 kg)	Fr	Livonia, Michigan
F	2	James Farr	6 ft 9 in (2.06 m)	237 lb (108 kg)	Fr	Evanston, Illinois
G	3	Joe Schuessler	6 ft 2 in (1.88 m)	175 lb (79 kg)	RS Fr	Glen Ellyn, Illinois
F	4	Travis Taylor	6 ft 8 in (2.03 m)	216 lb (98 kg)	Sr	Union, New Jersey
G	11	Darwin Davis	6 ft 1 in (1.85 m)	161 lb (73 kg)	So	Bloomington, Indiana
G	12	Brad Redford	6 ft 1 in (1.85 m)	182 lb (83 kg)	RS Sr	Frankenmuth, Michigan
G	14	Tim Whelan	5 ft 9 in (1.75 m)	160 lb (73 kg)	Jr	Cincinnati, Ohio
G	15	Myles Davis (I)	6 ft 2 in (1.88 m)	205 lb (93 kg)	Fr	Plainfield, New Jersey
F	21	Jeff Robinson	6 ft 10 in (2.08 m)	225 lb (102 kg)	Sr	Indianapolis, Indiana
G	22	Landon Amos	6 ft 4 in (1.93 m)	185 lb (84 kg)	Jr	Chicago, Illinois
F	31	Isaiah Philmore	6 ft 8 in (2.03 m)	236 lb (107 kg)	RS Jr	Bel Air, Maryland
F	32	Kevin Coker	6 ft 6 in (1.98 m)	200 lb (91 kg)	Sr	Plainfield, Illinois
F	35	Erik Stenger	6 ft 8 in (2.03 m)	207 lb (94 kg)	RS Jr	Cincinnati, Ohio
F	40	Matt Stainbrook (redshirt)	6 ft 10 in (2.08 m)	263 lb (119 kg)	Jr	Bay Village, Ohio

Head coach

- Chris Mack (Xavier)

Assistant coach(es)

- Ashley Howard (Drexel)
- Mike Pegues (Delaware)
- Travis Steele (Butler)

Legend

- (C) Team captain
- (S) Suspended
- (I) Ineligible
- (W) Walk-on
- Injured
- Current redshirt

Roster
Last update: 2012-10-26

=== Departures ===
Name	Number	Pos.	Height	Weight	Year	Hometown	Notes
Kenny Frease	32	C	7'0"	279	Senior	Massillon, Ohio	Graduated
Tu Holloway	52	G	6'0"	190	Senior	Hempstead, New York	Graduated
Griffin McKenzie	44	F	6'9"	240	Sophomore	Cincinnati, Ohio	Transferred to Denver
Mark Lyons	10	G	6'1"	185	Junior	Schenectady, New York	Transferred to Arizona
Dez Wells	5	G/F	6'5"	215	Freshman	Raleigh, North Carolina	Expelled
Andre Walker	54	F	6'8"	225	Senior	Flossmoor, Illinois	Graduated

== Schedule and results ==
Date time, TV	Rank^{#}	Opponent^{#}	Result	Record	Site city, state
Exhibition
November 3, 2012*; 7:00 pm		Kentucky State	W 73–54		Cintas Center; Cincinnati, OH
Regular season
November 9, 2012*; 7:00 pm, FSOH		Fairleigh Dickinson	W 117–75	1–0	Cintas Center; Cincinnati, OH
November 13, 2012*; 2:00 pm, ESPN		Butler; ESPN Tip Off Marathon	W 62–47	2–0	Cintas Center; Cincinnati, OH
November 17, 2012*; 2:00 pm, FSOH		Robert Morris	W 61–59	3–0	Cintas Center; Cincinnati, OH
November 22, 2012*; 1:00 pm, ESPNU		Pacific; DirecTV Classic	L 67–70	3–1	Anaheim Convention Center; Anaheim, CA
November 23, 2012*; 6:00 pm, ESPNU		vs. Drexel; DirecTV Classic consolation round	W 69–65	4–1	Anaheim Convention Center; Anaheim, CA
November 25, 2012*; 1:30 pm, ESPNU		vs. Drake; DirecTV Classic 5th place game	W 74–70	5–1	Anaheim Convention Center; Anaheim, CA
December 1, 2012*; 2:15 pm, BTN		at Purdue	W 63–57	6–1	Mackey Arena; West Lafayette, IN
December 6, 2012*; 7:30 pm, ESPNU		Vanderbilt	L 64–66 ^{OT}	6–2	Cintas Center; Cincinnati, OH
December 9, 2012*; 4:00 pm, FSOH		Kent State	W 62–55	7–2	Cintas Center; Cincinnati, OH
December 19, 2012*; 7:00 pm, ESPN2		vs. No. 11 Cincinnati; Skyline Chili Crosstown Classic	L 45–60	7–3	U.S. Bank Arena; Cincinnati, OH
December 22, 2012*; 2:00 pm, FSOH		Wofford	L 55–56	7–4	Cintas Center; Cincinnati, OH
December 29, 2012*; 6:00 pm, ESPNU		at Tennessee	L 47–51	7–5	Thompson–Boling Arena; Knoxville, TN
January 2, 2013*; 7:00 pm, ESPN3		at Wake Forest; Skip Prosser Classic	L 59–66	7–6	LJVM Coliseum; Winston-Salem, NC
January 10, 2013; 7:00 pm, TWCSOH		Temple	W 57–52	8–6 (1–0)	Cintas Center; Cincinnati, OH
January 12, 2013; 4:00 pm, CBSSN		George Washington	W 71–56	9–6 (2–0)	Cintas Center; Cincinnati, OH
January 16, 2013; 8:00 pm, CBSSN		at St. Bonaventure	W 66–64	10–6 (3–0)	Reilly Center; St. Bonaventure, NY
January 19, 2013; 2:00 pm, TWCSOH		La Salle	W 70–63	11–6 (4–0)	Cintas Center; Cincinnati, OH
January 23, 2013; 7:30 pm, FSOH		at Charlotte	L 57–63	11–7 (4–1)	Halton Arena; Charlotte, NC
January 26, 2013; 6:00 pm, CBSSN		at Saint Joseph's	L 49–59	11–8 (4–2)	Hagan Arena; Philadelphia, PA
January 30, 2013; 9:00 pm, CBSSN		Dayton	W 66–61	12–8 (5–2)	Cintas Center; Cincinnati, OH
February 2, 2013; 6:00 pm, FSOH		at Richmond	L 71–73	12–9 (5–3)	Robins Center; Richmond, VA
February 9, 2013; 7:00 pm, TWCSOH		at Duquesne	W 73–65	13–9 (6–3)	CONSOL Energy Center; Pittsburgh, PA
February 13, 2013; 7:00 pm, TWCSOH		Fordham	W 79–66	14–9 (7–3)	Cintas Center; Cincinnati, OH
February 16, 2013; 12:00 pm, ESPN2		at Dayton	L 59–70	14–10 (7–4)	University of Dayton Arena; Dayton, OH
February 20, 2013; 7:00 pm, FSOH		at Rhode Island	W 55–42	15–10 (8–4)	Ryan Center; Kingston, RI
February 23, 2013; 2:00 pm, CBSSN		No. 24 VCU	L 71–75	15–11 (8–5)	Cintas Center; Cincinnati, OH
February 26, 2013*; 7:00 pm, ESPN2		No. 19 Memphis	W 64–62	16–11	Cintas Center; Cincinnati, OH
March 2, 2013; 2:00 pm, CBSSN		Massachusetts	L 72–77	16–12 (8–6)	Cintas Center; Cincinnati, OH
March 6, 2013; 9:00 pm, TWCSOH		No. 16 Saint Louis	W 77–66 ^{OT}	17–12 (9–6)	Cintas Center; Cincinnati, OH
March 9, 2013; 6:30 pm, CBSSN		at Butler	L 62–67	17–13 (9–7)	Hinkle Fieldhouse; Indianapolis, IN
A-10 tournament
March 14, 2013; 6:30 pm, NBCSN	(7)	vs. (10) Saint Joseph's; First Round	L 57–58	17–14	Barclays Center; Brooklyn, NY
*Non-conference game. ^{#}Rankings from AP Poll. (#) Tournament seedings in parentheses. All times are in Eastern Time..
