= 2011–12 Saint Joseph's Hawks men's basketball team =

American college basketball season

2011–12 Saint Joseph's Hawks men's basketball
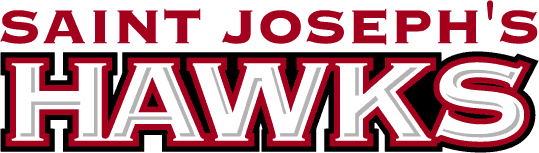

Philadelphia Big 5 co-champions

NIT, First Round
- Conference: Atlantic 10 Conference
- Record: 20–14 (9–7 A-10)
- Head coach: Phil Martelli (17th season)
- Assistant coaches: Mark Bass; David Duda; Geoff Arnold
- Home arena: Hagan Arena

2011–12 Atlantic 10 men's basketball standings
	Conf.				Overall
Team	W		L	PCT	W		L	PCT
Temple	13	–	3	.813	24	–	8	.750
Saint Louis	12	–	4	.750	26	–	8	.765
Xavier	10	–	6	.625	23	–	13	.639
St. Bonaventure†	10	–	6	.625	20	–	12	.625
UMass	9	–	7	.563	26	–	11	.703
La Salle	9	–	7	.563	21	–	13	.618
Dayton	9	–	7	.563	20	–	13	.606
Saint Joseph's	9	–	7	.563	20	–	14	.588
Duquesne	7	–	9	.438	16	–	15	.516
Richmond	7	–	9	.438	16	–	16	.500
Charlotte	5	–	11	.313	13	–	17	.433
George Washington	5	–	11	.313	10	–	21	.323
Rhode Island	4	–	12	.250	7	–	24	.226
Fordham	3	–	13	.188	10	–	19	.345
† 2012 Atlantic 10 Tournament winner As of March 13, 2012; Rankings from AP Poll

The 2011–12 Saint Joseph's Hawks basketball team represented Saint Joseph's University during the 2011–12 NCAA Division I men's basketball season. The Hawks, led by 17th year head coach Phil Martelli, played their home games at Hagan Arena and are members of the Atlantic 10 Conference. They finished the season 20–14, 9–7 in A-10 to finish in a four-way tie for fifth place. They lost in the quarterfinals of the A-10 Basketball tournament to St. Bonaventure. They were invited to the 2012 National Invitation Tournament where they lost in the first round to Northern Iowa.

== Roster ==
Number	Name	Position	Height	Weight	Year	Hometown
0	Evan Maschmeyer	Guard	6–3	200	Freshman	Jeffersonville, Indiana
1	C. J. Aiken	Forward	6–9	200	Sophomore	Conshohocken, Pennsylvania
5	Christopher Coyne	Guard	6–2	174	Junior	Brooklyn, New York
10	Langston Galloway	Guard	6–2	200	Sophomore	Baton Rouge, Louisiana
11	Daryus Quarles	Guard/Forward	6–6	190	Sophomore	Paulsboro, New Jersey
13	Ronald Roberts, Jr.	Forward	6–8	215	Sophomore	Bayonne, New Jersey
21	Halil Kanacević	Forward	6–8	260	Sophomore	Staten Island, New York
22	Taylor Trevisan	Guard	6–2	185	Junior	West Chester, Pennsylvania
24	Chris Wilson	Guard	6–3	209	Freshman	Fayetteville, North Carolina
25	Ryan Hess	Guard	6–2	181	Freshman	Westfield, New Jersey
32	Papa Ndao	Forward	6–8	220	Freshman	Dakar, Senegal
35	Carl Jones	Guard	5–11	160	Junior	Garfield Heights, Ohio
41	Colin Kelly	Forward	6–5	205	Sophomore	West Deptford Township, New Jersey
30	Malcolm Donckers	Guard	6-0	180	Freshman	Camden, New Jersey

== Schedule ==
Date time, TV	Rank^{#}	Opponent^{#}	Result	Record	Site (attendance) city, state
Regular season
11/11/2011*; 8:00 pm, FCS		at WKU	W 72–61	1–0	E. A. Diddle Arena (3,813); Bowling Green, KY
11/17/2011*; 8:00 pm, TCN		vs. Georgia Tech; Charleston Classic First Round	W 66–53	2–0	TD Arena (2,941); Charleston, SC
11/18/2011*; 6:00 pm, TCN		vs. Seton Hall; Charleston Classic Semifinals	L 70–78	2–1	TD Arena (NA); Charleston, SC
11/20/2011*; 6:00 pm, ESPNU		vs. Tulsa; Charleston Classic 3rd Place Game	W 79–75	3–1	TD Arena (NA); Charleston, SC
11/23/2011*; 7:00 pm		vs. Iona	L 99–104	3–2	Hynes Athletic Center (2,611); New Rochelle, NY
11/26/2011*; 3:30 pm		Penn State	W 65–47	4–2	Hagan Arena (4,200); Philadelphia, PA
11/30/2011*; 7:00 pm		Drexel	W 62–49	5–2	Hagan Arena (4,200); Philadelphia, PA
12/04/2011*; 8:00 pm, CSNMA		at American	L 60–66	5–3	Bender Arena (1,113); Washington, D.C.
12/07/2011*; 7:00 pm		Boston University	W 75–68	6–3	Hagan Arena (3,579); Philadelphia, PA
12/10/2011*; 12:00 pm, TCN		No. 19 Creighton	W 80–71	7–3	Hagan Arena (4,200); Philadelphia, PA
12/17/2011*; 8:00 pm, CBSSN		Villanova; Big 5 Game	W 74–58	8–3	Hagan Arena (4,200); Philadelphia, PA
12/21/2011*; 7:00 pm		Coppin State	W 81–72	9–3	Hagan Arena (3,466); Philadelphia, PA
12/28/2011*; 7:00 pm		Morgan State	W 81–50	10–3	Hagan Arena (4,200); Philadelphia, PA
12/31/2011*; 4:00 pm		at No. 24 Harvard	L 69–74	10–4	Lavietes Pavilion (2,195); Boston, MA
01/04/2012; 7:00 pm		at Duquesne	W 84–82 ^{OT}	11–4 (1–0)	Palumbo Center (2,550); Pittsburgh, PA
01/07/2012; 2:00 pm		Charlotte	L 52–57	11–5 (1–1)	Hagan Arena (4,200); Philadelphia, PA
01/11/2012; 7:00 pm		Fordham	W 80–62	12–5 (2–1)	Hagan Arena (3,765); Philadelphia, PA
01/14/2012; 4:00 pm		at Massachusetts	L 62–71	12–6 (2–2)	Mullins Center (4,616); Amherst, MA
01/18/2012; 7:00 pm, TCN		at Xavier	L 55–68	12–7 (2–3)	Cintas Center (9,919); Cincinnati, OH
01/21/2012*; 7:00 pm		Penn; Big 5 Game	L 80–84	12–8	The Palestra (8,722); Philadelphia, PA
01/25/2012; 7:00 pm, TCN		Dayton	W 77–63	13–8 (3–3)	Hagan Arena (3,781); Philadelphia, PA
01/28/2012; 4:00 pm, TCN		at Temple; Big 5 Game	L 60–78	13–9 (3–4)	Liacouras Center (10,302); Philadelphia, PA
02/01/2012; 7:00 pm		at Richmond	W 70–60	14–9 (4–4)	Robins Center (4,219); Richmond, VA
02/04/2012; 12:00 pm, TCN		vs. La Salle; Big 5 Game	W 70–66	15–9 (5–4)	The Palastra (8,722); Philadelphia, PA
02/08/2012; 8:30 pm, TCN		Saint Louis	L 60–72	15–10 (5–5)	Hagan Arena (3,751); Philadelphia, PA
02/11/2012; 7:00 pm		Massachusetts	W 73–62	16–10 (6–5)	Hagan Arena (4,200); Philadelphia, PA
02/15/2012; 7:00 pm		at Rhode Island	W 80–69	17–10 (7–5)	Ryan Center (3,554); Kingston, RI
02/18/2012; 4:00 pm, CSN		at George Washington	W 73–66	18–10 (8–5)	Charles E. Smith Athletic Center (3,774); Washington, D.C.
02/22/2012; 7:00 pm		Richmond	L 49–52	18–11 (8–6)	Hagan Arena (3,951); Philadelphia, PA
02/25/2012; 7:00 pm, ESPNU		No. 22 Temple; Big 5 Game	W 82–72	19–11 (9–6)	Hagan Arena (4,200); Philadelphia, PA
02/29/2012; 7:00 pm		St. Bonaventure	L 93–98 ^{2OT}	19–12 (9–7)	Reilly Center (3,539); St. Bonaventure, NY
2012 Atlantic 10 men's basketball tournament
03/06/2012; 7:00 pm		Charlotte; First Round	W 80–64	20–12	Hagan Arena (3,891); Philadelphia, PA
03/09/2012; 2:30 pm, CBSSN		vs. St. Bonaventure; Quarterfinals	L 68–71	20–13	Boardwalk Hall (7,022); Atlantic City, NJ
2012 NIT
03/14/2012*; 7:15 pm, ESPN3		Northern Iowa; First Round	L 65–67	20–14	Hagan Arena (2,851); Philadelphia, PA
*Non-conference game. ^{#}Rankings from AP Poll. (#) Tournament seedings in parentheses. All times are in Eastern Time.
