= 2011–12 UMass Minutemen basketball team =

American college basketball season

2011–12 UMass Minutemen men's basketball

NIT, Semifinals
- Conference: Atlantic 10 Conference
- Record: 25–12 (9–7 A-10)
- Head coach: Derek Kellogg (4th season)
- Assistant coaches: Shyrone Chatman; Adam Ginsburg; Antwon Jackson
- Home arena: William D. Mullins Memorial Center

2011–12 Atlantic 10 men's basketball standings
	Conf.				Overall
Team	W		L	PCT	W		L	PCT
Temple	13	–	3	.813	24	–	8	.750
Saint Louis	12	–	4	.750	26	–	8	.765
Xavier	10	–	6	.625	23	–	13	.639
St. Bonaventure†	10	–	6	.625	20	–	12	.625
UMass	9	–	7	.563	26	–	11	.703
La Salle	9	–	7	.563	21	–	13	.618
Dayton	9	–	7	.563	20	–	13	.606
Saint Joseph's	9	–	7	.563	20	–	14	.588
Duquesne	7	–	9	.438	16	–	15	.516
Richmond	7	–	9	.438	16	–	16	.500
Charlotte	5	–	11	.313	13	–	17	.433
George Washington	5	–	11	.313	10	–	21	.323
Rhode Island	4	–	12	.250	7	–	24	.226
Fordham	3	–	13	.188	10	–	19	.345
† 2012 Atlantic 10 Tournament winner As of March 13, 2012; Rankings from AP Poll

The 2011–12 UMass Minutemen basketball team represented the University of Massachusetts Amherst during the 2011–12 NCAA Division I men's basketball season. The Minutemen, led by fourth year head coach Derek Kellogg, played their home games at William D. Mullins Memorial Center, with one home game played at Curry Hicks Cage, and are members of the Atlantic 10 Conference. They finished the season 25–12, 9–7 in A-10 play to finish in a four way tie for fifth place. They lost in the semifinals of the Atlantic 10 Basketball tournament to St. Bonaventure. They were invited to the 2012 National Invitation Tournament where they defeated Mississippi State, Seton Hall, and Drexel en route to the semifinals at Madison Square Garden where they fell to Stanford.

== Roster ==
Number	Name	Position	Height	Weight	Year	Hometown
0	Javorn Farrell	Guard/Forward	6–5	215	Junior	Woodbridge, Virginia
1	Maxie Esho	Forward	6–8	205	RS Freshman	Upper Marlboro, Maryland
3	Chaz Williams	Guard	5–9	175	RS Sophomore	Brooklyn, New York
4	Freddie Riley	Guard	6–5	190	Junior	Ocala, Florida
5	Jesse Morgan	Guard	6–5	190	Sophomore	Philadelphia, Pennsylvania
10	Cady Lalanne	Forward/Center	6–9	250	Freshman	Orlando, Florida
12	Jordan Laguerre	Guard	6–2	190	Freshman	Manchester, New Hampshire
13	Trey Lang	Forward	6–7	240	RS Senior	Marietta, Georgia
22	Sampson Carter	Forward	6–8	220	Junior	Baton Rouge, Louisiana
33	Terrell Vinson	Forward	6–7	220	Junior	Baltimore, Maryland
34	Raphiael Putney	Forward	6–9	185	RS Sophomore	Woodbridge, Virginia
50	Matt Hill	Forward	6–7	225	RS Senior	Middletown, Connecticut
52	Andrew McCarthy	Center	7–1	260	RS Freshman	Scituate, Massachusetts
54	Sean Carter	Forward/Center	6–9	245	RS Senior	Fayetteville, North Carolina

== Schedule ==
Date time, TV	Rank^{#}	Opponent^{#}	Result	Record	Site (attendance) city, state
Regular season
11/11/2011*; 9:00 pm		Elon	W 85–67	1–0	Curry Hicks Cage (3,093); Amherst, MA
11/14/2011*; 7:00 pm, WBIN		Northeastern	W 83–67	2–0	Mullins Center (2,663); Amherst, MA
11/17/2011*; 7:00 pm		NJIT	W 79–58	3–0	Mullins Center (2,497); Amherst, MA
11/21/2011*; 7:00 pm, ESPN3		at Boston College; Commonwealth Classic	W 83–46	4–0	Conte Forum (4,162); Chestnut Hill, MA
11/24/2011*; 4:30 pm, Versus		vs. No. 22 Florida State; Battle 4 Atlantis First Round	L 53–73	4–1	Imperial Arena (1,493); Nassau, Bahamas
11/25/2011*; 9:30 pm, HDNet		vs. Utah; Battle 4 Atlantis Consolation round	W 89–75	5–1	Imperial Arena (3,441); Nassau, Bahamas
11/26/2011*; 7:00 pm, HDNet		vs. College of Charleston; Battle 4 Atlantis 5th place Game	L 61–85	5–2	Imperial Arena; Nassau, Bahamas
11/30/2011*; 7:00 pm		Towson	W 86–56	6–2	Mullins Center (2,579); Amherst, MA
12/03/2011*; 7:00 pm, ESPNU		at Miami (FL)	L 75–83	6–3	BankUnited Center (3,653); Coral Gables, FL
12/06/2011*; 7:00 pm		at East Carolina	W 63–58	7–3	Williams Arena (4,419); Greenville, NC
12/09/2011*; 7:00 pm		vs. Siena; Hall of Fame Holiday Showcase	W 82–78	8–3	MassMutual Center (4,236); Springfield, MA
12/17/2011*; 7:00 pm, NESN		Quinnipiac	W 72–67	9–3	Mullins Center (2,890); Amherst, MA
12/22/2011*; 7:00 pm		Davidson	W 73–65	10–3	Mullins Center (3,821); Amherst, MA
12/30/2011*; 7:00 pm		Central Connecticut	W 97–65	11–3	Mullins Center (3,576); Amherst, MA
01/05/2012; 7:00 pm		Fordham	W 80–76	12–3 (1–0)	Mullins Center (2,846); Amherst, MA
01/08/2012; 2:00 pm, CSNNE		at La Salle	L 75–82	12–4 (1–1)	Tom Gola Arena (2,395); Philadelphia, PA
01/11/2012; 7:00 pm		Charlotte	W 85–75	13–4 (2–1)	Mullins Center (2,760); Amherst, MA
01/14/2012; 4:00 pm		Saint Joseph's	W 71–62	14–4 (3–1)	Mullins Center (4,616); Amherst, MA
01/18/2012; 7:00 pm		at Duquesne	L 69–80	14–5 (3–2)	Palumbo Center (3,207); Pittsburgh, PA
01/21/2012; 5:00 pm, CBSSN		at Richmond	W 79–68	15–5 (4–2)	Robins Center (7,231); Richmond, VA
01/28/2012; 2:00 pm, CBSSN		Saint Louis	W 72–59	16–5 (5–2)	Mullins Center (8,399); Amherst, MA
02/01/2012; 7:00 pm		at Rhode Island	L 78–81 ^{OT}	16–6 (5–3)	Ryan Center (4,236); Kingston, RI
02/04/2012; 7:00 pm		at George Washington	W 86–75	17–6 (6–3)	Charles E. Smith Athletic Center (3,143); Washington, D.C.
02/08/2012; 7:30 pm		St. Bonaventure	W 76–67	18–6 (7–3)	Mullins Center (4,253); Amherst, MA
02/11/2012; 7:00 pm		at Saint Joseph's	L 62–73	18–7 (7–4)	Hagan Arena (4,200); Philadelphia, PA
02/18/2012; 6:00 pm, CBSSN		La Salle	L 71–72	18–8 (7–5)	Mullins Center (6,283); Amherst, MA
02/21/2012; 7:00 pm, CBSSN		Xavier	W 80–73	19–8 (8–5)	Mullins Center (6,632); Amherst, MA
02/25/2012; 6:00 pm, CBSSN		at Dayton	L 43–76	19–9 (8–6)	UD Arena (13,435); Dayton, OH
02/29/2012; 7:00 pm		at No. 23 Temple	L 88–90 ^{OT}	19–10 (8–7)	Liacouras Center (6,519); Philadelphia, PA
03/03/2012; 4:00 pm, CBSSN		Rhode Island	W 89–83	20–10 (9–7)	Mullins Center (7,501); Amherst, MA
2012 Atlantic 10 men's basketball tournament
03/06/2012; 7:00 pm	(8)	(9) Duquesne; A-10 First Round	W 92–83	21–10	Mullins Center (4,061); Amherst, MA
03/09/2012; 12:00 pm, CBSSN	(8)	vs. (1) Temple; A-10 Quarterfinals	W 77–71	22–10	Boardwalk Hall (7,022); Atlantic City, NJ
03/10/2012; 1:00 pm, CBSSN	(8)	vs. (4) St. Bonaventure; A-10 Semifinals	L 80–84	22–11	Boardwalk Hall (6,784); Atlantic City, NJ
2012 NIT
03/13/2012*; 7:00 pm, ESPN2	(5 SH)	at (4 SH) Mississippi State; NIT First Round	W 101–96 ^{2OT}	23–11	Humphrey Coliseum (2,507); Starkville, MS
03/17/2012*; 11:00 am, ESPN	(5 SH)	at (1 SH) Seton Hall; NIT Second Round	W 77–67	24–11	Walsh Gymnasium (1,674); South Orange, NJ
03/20/2012*; 7:00 pm, ESPN	(5 SH)	at (3 SH) Drexel; NIT Quarterfinals	W 72–70	25–11	Daskalakis Athletic Center (2,293); Philadelphia, PA
03/27/2012*; 7:00 pm, ESPN2	(5 SH)	vs. (3 A) Stanford; NIT Semifinals	L 64–74	25–12	Madison Square Garden (7,574); New York, NY
*Non-conference game. ^{#}Rankings from AP Poll. (#) Tournament seedings in parentheses. A=NIT Arizona bracket. SH=NIT Seton Hall bracket. All times are in Eastern Time.
