= 2011–12 La Salle Explorers men's basketball team =

American college basketball season

2011–12 La Salle Explorers men's basketball
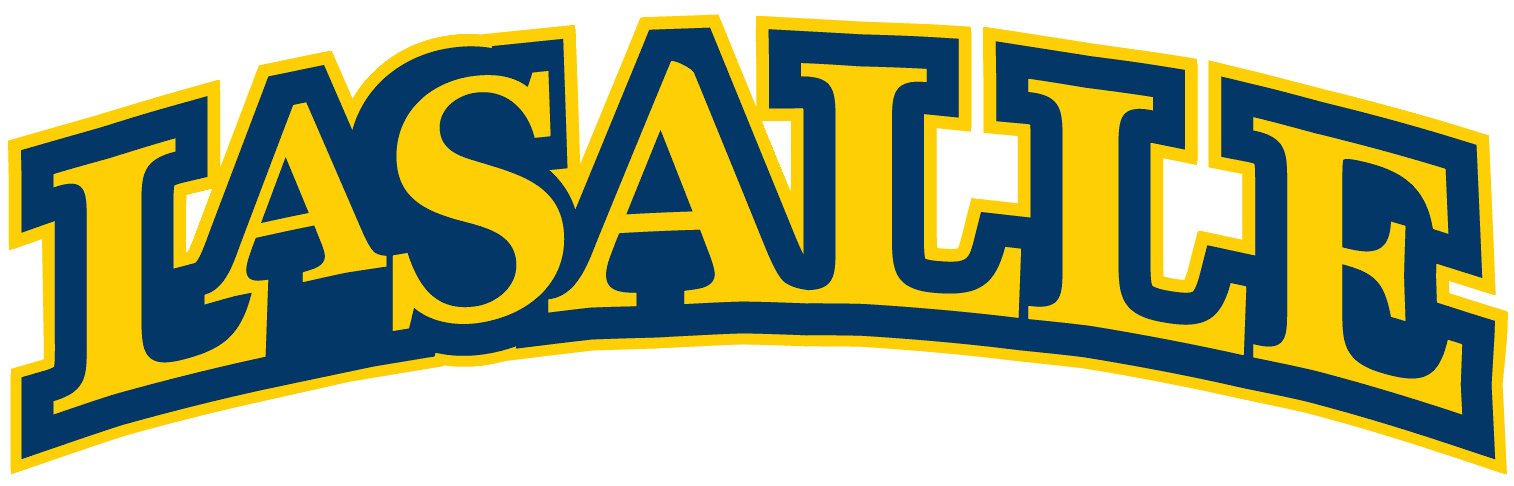

NIT, First Round
- Conference: Atlantic 10 Conference
- Record: 21–13 (9–7 A-10)
- Head coach: John Giannini (8th season)
- Assistant coaches: Horace Owens; Harris Adler; Will Bailey
- Home arena: Tom Gola Arena

2011–12 Atlantic 10 men's basketball standings
	Conf.				Overall
Team	W		L	PCT	W		L	PCT
Temple	13	–	3	.813	24	–	8	.750
Saint Louis	12	–	4	.750	26	–	8	.765
Xavier	10	–	6	.625	23	–	13	.639
St. Bonaventure†	10	–	6	.625	20	–	12	.625
UMass	9	–	7	.563	26	–	11	.703
La Salle	9	–	7	.563	21	–	13	.618
Dayton	9	–	7	.563	20	–	13	.606
Saint Joseph's	9	–	7	.563	20	–	14	.588
Duquesne	7	–	9	.438	16	–	15	.516
Richmond	7	–	9	.438	16	–	16	.500
Charlotte	5	–	11	.313	13	–	17	.433
George Washington	5	–	11	.313	10	–	21	.323
Rhode Island	4	–	12	.250	7	–	24	.226
Fordham	3	–	13	.188	10	–	19	.345
† 2012 Atlantic 10 Tournament winner As of March 13, 2012; Rankings from AP Poll

The 2011–12 La Salle Explorers basketball team represented La Salle University during the 2011–12 NCAA Division I men's basketball season. The Explorers, led by eighth year head coach John Giannini, played their home games at Tom Gola Arena and are members of the Atlantic 10 Conference. They finished the season 21–13, 9–7 in A-10 to finish in a four-way tie for fifth place. They lost in the quarterfinals of the A-10 Basketball tournament to Saint Louis. They were invited to the 2012 National Invitation Tournament where they lost in the first round to Minnesota.

== Roster ==
Number	Name	Position	Height	Weight	Year	Hometown
1	D. J. Peterson	Guard	6–5	185	Freshman	Burnsville, Minnesota
3	Tyreek Duren	Guard	6–0	180	Sophomore	Philadelphia
5	Taylor Dunn	Guard	6–2	200	Junior	State College, Pennsylvania
10	Sam Mills	Guard	6–2	180	Sophomore	Sunrise, Florida
14	Devon White	Forward	6–8	240	Senior	Philadelphia
21	Stephen Zack	Center	6–11	240	Freshman	New Cumberland, Pennsylvania
23	Earl Pettis	Guard	6–5	215	Freshman	Philadelphia
25	Jerrell Wright	Forward	6–8	230	Freshman	Philadelphia
35	Rohan Brown	Guard/Forward	6–6	205	Freshman	Hartford, Connecticut
42	Matt Sheehan	Forward	6–4	245	Senior	Havertown, Pennsylvania
55	Ramon Galloway	Guard	6–3	175	Junior	Philadelphia
	Tyrone Garland	Guard	6–1	180	Sophomore	Philadelphia

== Schedule ==
Date time, TV	Rank^{#}	Opponent^{#}	Result	Record	Site (attendance) city, state
Exhibition
11/04/2011*; 7:00 pm		Carleton	W 74–56	—	Tom Gola Arena; Philadelphia, PA
Regular season
11/11/2011*; 7:00 pm		Lafayette	W 79–53	1–0	Tom Gola Center (2,322); Philadelphia, PA
11/15/2011*; 7:00 pm, ESPN3		at Villanova; Big 5 Game	L 69–76	1–1	The Pavilion (6,500); Villanova, Pennsylvania
11/19/2011*; 3:00 pm		James Madison; Philly Hoop Group Classic, Homecoming	W 92–83	2–1	Tom Gola Center (2,951); Philadelphia, PA
11/22/2011*; 7:00 pm, ESPN3		at No. 17 Pittsburgh; Philly Hoop Group Classic	L 69–73	2–2	Petersen Events Center (8,375); Pittsburgh, PA
11/25/2011*; 4:30 pm, TCN		vs. Robert Morris; Philly Hoop Group Classic	L 44–51	2–3	The Palestra (1,211); Philadelphia, PA
11/26/2011*; 4:30 pm, TCN		vs. Rider; Philly Hoop Group Classic	W 82–70	3–3	The Palestra (2,824); Philadelphia, PA
11/30/2011*; 7:00 pm		Northeastern	W 68–51	4–3	Tom Gola Center (1,511); Philadelphia, PA
12/03/2011*; 4:00 pm		Bucknell	W 78–52	5–3	Tom Gola Arena (1,823); Philadelphia, PA
12/07/2011*; 7:00 pm		at Towson	W 89–51	6–3	Towson Center (648); Towson, MD
12/10/2011*; 2:00 pm		Army	W 76–64	7–3	Tom Gola Center (1,562); Philadelphia, PA
12/19/2011*; 7:00 pm		at Delaware	L 66–70	7–4	Bob Carpenter Center (2,345); Newark, DE
12/22/2011*; 7:00 pm		at Central Connecticut	W 85–59	8–4	William H. Detrick Gymnasium (1,612); New Britain, CT
12/29/2011*; 2:00 pm		Boston University	W 70–53	9–4	Tom Gola Center (1,547); Philadelphia, PA
12/31/2011*; 2:00 pm		Hartford	W 73–55	10–4	Tom Gola Center (1,233); Philadelphia, PA
01/04/2012; 6:00 pm, TCN		Xavier	W 80–70	11–4 (1–0)	Tom Gola Arena (2,075); Philadelphia, PA
01/08/2012; 2:00 pm, CSN		Massachusetts	W 82–75	12–4 (2–0)	Tom Gola Arena (2,395); Philadelphia, PA
01/10/2012*; 7:00 pm		at Penn; Big 5 Game	W 68–57	13–4	The Palestra (4,480); Philadelphia, PA
01/14/2012; 7:00 pm		at Dayton	L 75–79	13–5 (2–1)	UD Arena (12,580); Dayton, OH
01/18/2012; 7:00 pm		at Temple; Big 5 Game	L 70–76	13–6 (2–2)	Liacouras Center (8,068); Philadelphia, PA
01/21/2012; 4:00 pm		Rhode Island	W 80–66	14–6 (3–2)	Tom Gola Arena (2,622); Philadelphia, PA
01/25/2012; 7:00 pm		George Washington	W 78–63	15–6 (4–2)	Tom Gola Arena (2,085); Philadelphia, PA
01/28/2012; 7:00 pm		at Duquesne	W 71–68	16–6 (5–2)	Palumbo Center (3,531); Pittsburgh, PA
02/01/2012; 7:00 pm		Charlotte	W 85–72	17–6 (6–2)	Tom Gola Arena (1,778); Philadelphia
02/04/2012; 12:00 pm, TCN		vs. Saint Joseph's; Big 5 Game	L 66–70	17–7 (6–3)	The Palestra (8,722); Philadelphia, PA
02/08/2012; 7:00 pm		at Richmond	L 76–78	17–8 (6–4)	Robins Center (4,028); Richmond, VA
02/11/2012; 2:00 pm		Saint Louis	L 51–59	17–9 (6–5)	Tom Gola Arena (2,903); Philadelphia, PA
02/18/2012; 6:00 pm, CBSSN		at Massachusetts	W 72–71	18–9 (7–5)	William D. Mullins Memorial Center (6,283); Amherst, MA
02/22/2012; 7:00 pm		No. 22 Temple; Big 5 Game	L 79–80 ^{OT}	18–10 (7–6)	Tom Gola Arena (3,400); Philadelphia, PA
02/25/2012; 1:00 pm, YES		at Fordham	L 62–67	18–11 (7–7)	Rose Hill Gymnasium (2,796); Bronx, NY
02/29/2012; 7:00 pm		at George Washington	W 60–56	19–11 (8–7)	Charles E. Smith Athletic Center (2,216); Washington, D.C.
03/03/2012; 2:00 pm		St. Bonaventure	W 71–61	20–11 (9–7)	Tom Gola Arena (2,616); Philadelphia, PA
Atlantic 10 tournament
03/06/2012; 7:00 pm		Richmond; First Round	W 80–72	21–11	Tom Gola Arena (1,702); Philadelphia, PA
03/09/2012; 6:30 pm, CBSSN		vs. Saint Louis; Quarterfinals	L 71–78	21–12	Boardwalk Hall (5,955); Atlantic City, NJ
NIT
03/14/2012*; 7:00 pm, ESPN2		Minnesota; First Round	L 61–70	21–13	Tom Gola Arena (3,023); Philadelphia, PA
*Non-conference game. ^{#}Rankings from AP Poll. (#) Tournament seedings in parentheses. All times are in Eastern Time.
