= 2011–12 Dayton Flyers men's basketball team =

American college basketball season

2011–12 Dayton Flyers men's basketball
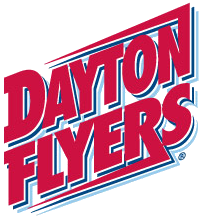

Old Spice Classic Champions

NIT, First Round
- Conference: Atlantic 10 Conference
- Record: 20–13 (9–7 A-10)
- Head coach: Archie Miller (1st season)
- Assistant coaches: Kevin Kuwik; Allen Griffin; Tom Ostrom
- Home arena: University of Dayton Arena

2011–12 Atlantic 10 men's basketball standings
	Conf.				Overall
Team	W		L	PCT	W		L	PCT
Temple	13	–	3	.813	24	–	8	.750
Saint Louis	12	–	4	.750	26	–	8	.765
Xavier	10	–	6	.625	23	–	13	.639
St. Bonaventure†	10	–	6	.625	20	–	12	.625
UMass	9	–	7	.563	26	–	11	.703
La Salle	9	–	7	.563	21	–	13	.618
Dayton	9	–	7	.563	20	–	13	.606
Saint Joseph's	9	–	7	.563	20	–	14	.588
Duquesne	7	–	9	.438	16	–	15	.516
Richmond	7	–	9	.438	16	–	16	.500
Charlotte	5	–	11	.313	13	–	17	.433
George Washington	5	–	11	.313	10	–	21	.323
Rhode Island	4	–	12	.250	7	–	24	.226
Fordham	3	–	13	.188	10	–	19	.345
† 2012 Atlantic 10 Tournament winner As of March 13, 2012; Rankings from AP Poll

The 2011–12 Dayton Flyers men's basketball team represented the University of Dayton during the 2011–12 NCAA Division I men's basketball season. The Flyers, led by first year head coach Archie Miller, played their home games at the University of Dayton Arena and are members of the Atlantic 10 Conference. They finished the season 20–13 and 9–7 in A-10 to finish in a four way tie for fifth place. They were champions of the 2011 Old Spice Classic. They lost in the quarterfinals of the A-10 Basketball tournament to Xavier. They were invited to the 2012 National Invitation Tournament where they lost in the first round to Iowa.

== Roster ==
Number	Name	Position	Height	Weight	Year	Hometown
1	Kevin Dillard	Guard	6–0	170	Junior	Homewood, Illinois
2	Josh Benson	Forward/Center	6–9	223	Junior	Dayton, Ohio
3	Mitch Asmus	Forward	6–5	195	Sophomore	Okemos, Michigan
4	Chris Johnson	Forward	6–6	201	Senior	Columbus, Ohio
5	Devin Oliver	Forward	6–7	200	Sophomore	Kalamazoo, Michigan
12	Josh Parker	Guard	6–0	186	Senior	Harvey, Illinois
21	Brian Vonderhaar	Guard	6–0	170	Junior	Cincinnati, Ohio
22	Paul Williams	Guard	6–4	212	Senior	Detroit, Michigan
23	Luke Fabrizius	Forward	6–9	228	Senior	Arlington Heights, Illinois
25	Alex Gavrilovic	Forward	6–9	230	Freshman	Strasbourg, France
35	Matt Kavanaugh	Forward/Center	6–9	250	Junior	Centerville, Ohio
50	Ralph Hill	Forward	6–6	210	Sophomore	Westerville, Ohio
	Matt Derenbecker	Forward	6–7	185	Freshman	Metairie, Louisiana
	Vee Sanford	Guard	6–3	180	Sophomore	Lexington, Kentucky

== Schedule ==
Date time, TV	Rank^{#}	Opponent^{#}	Result	Record	Site (attendance) city, state
Exhibition
October 29, 2011*; 4:00 pm		Walsh	W 92–78	—	UD Arena (10,785); Dayton, OH
November 5, 2011*; 7:00 pm		Findlay	W 87–66		UD Arena (11,385); Dayton, OH
Regular season
November 12, 2011*; 2:00 pm		Western Illinois	W 87–58	1–0	UD Arena (12,454); Dayton, OH
November 15, 2011*; 7:00 pm, WHIO		at Miami (OH)	L 67–72 ^{OT}	1–1	Millett Hall (3,143); Oxford, OH
November 19, 2011*; 2:00 pm, WHIO		UNC Wilmington	W 74–49	2–1	UD Arena (12,538); Dayton, OH
November 24, 2011*; 7:00 pm, ESPN2		vs. Wake Forest; Old Spice Classic First Round	W 80–76	3–1	HP Field House (3,537); Lake Buena Vista, FL
November 25, 2011*; 5:00 pm, ESPN2		vs. Fairfield; Old Spice Classic Semifinals	W 56–49	4–1	HP Field House (3,680); Lake Buena Vista, FL
November 27, 2011*; 6:30 pm, ESPN2		vs. Minnesota; Old Spice Classic Finals	W 86–70	5–1	HP Field House (3,874); Lake Buena Vista, FL
November 30, 2011*; 7:00 pm, FSOH		Buffalo	L 55–84	5–2	UD Arena (12,215); Dayton, OH
December 4, 2011*; 2:00 pm, FSOH		at Murray State	L 58–75	5–3	CFSB Center (3,857); Murray, KY
December 7, 2011*; 7:00 pm, WHIO		No. 16 Alabama	W 74–62	6–3	UD Arena (13,102); Dayton, OH
December 11, 2011*; 2:00 pm, FSOH		USC Upstate	W 72–68	7–3	UD Arena (11,331); Dayton, OH
December 17, 2011*; 7:00 pm		FIU	W 61–40	8–3	UD Arena (12,248); Dayton, OH
December 21, 2011*; 7:00 pm		Seton Hall	L 64–69	8–4	UD Arena (12,018); Dayton, OH
December 23, 2011*; 7:00 pm, WHIO		UIC	W 64–57	9–4	UD Arena (12,113); Dayton, OH
December 30, 2011*; 7:00 pm, WHIO		Ole Miss	W 62–50	10–4	UD Arena (12,656); Dayton, OH
January 4, 2012; 8:00 pm, WHIO		Saint Louis	W 79–72 ^{OT}	11–4 (1–0)	UD Arena (11,815); Dayton, OH
January 7, 2012; 4:00 pm, WHIO		at Temple	W 87–77	12–4 (2–0)	Liacouras Center (5,172); Philadelphia, PA
January 11, 2012; 7:00 pm, FSOH		at St. Bonaventure	L 73–81	12–5 (2–1)	Reilly Center (3,317); St. Bonaventure, NY
January 14, 2012; 7:00 pm		La Salle	W 79–75	13–5 (3–1)	UD Arena (12,580); Dayton, OH
January 21, 2012; 1:00 pm, ESPN2		Xavier; Blackburn/McCafferty Trophy	W 87–72	14–5 (4–1)	UD Arena (13,435); Dayton, OH
January 25, 2012; 7:00 pm		at Saint Joseph's	L 63–77	14–6 (4–2)	Hagan Arena (3,781); Philadelphia, PA
January 28, 2012; 7:00 pm, WHIO		Rhode Island	L 81–86	14–7 (4–3)	UD Arena (13,147); Dayton, OH
February 1, 2012; 7:00 pm, WHIO		Duquesne	L 73–83	14–8 (4–4)	UD Arena (12,615); Dayton, OH
February 4, 2012; 5:00 pm, FSOH		at Saint Louis	L 50–58	14–9 (4–5)	Chaifetz Arena (10,414); St. Louis, MO
February 11, 2012; 1:00 pm		at Fordham	W 72–70 ^{OT}	15–9 (5–5)	Rose Hill Gymnasium (3,200); Bronx, NY
February 15, 2012; 7:00 pm, FSOH		Charlotte	W 75–65	16–9 (6–5)	UD Arena (12,124); Dayton, OH
February 18, 2012; 8:00 pm, CBSSN		at Xavier; Blackburn/McCafferty Trophy	L 83–86 ^{OT}	16–10 (6–6)	Cintas Center (10,250); Cincinnati, OH
February 22, 2012; 8:00 pm, WHIO		at Duquesne	W 74–62	17–10 (7–6)	Palumbo Center (3,743); Pittsburgh, PA
February 25, 2012; 6:00 pm, CBSSN		UMass	W 76–43	18–10 (8–6)	UD Arena (13,435); Dayton, OH
February 29, 2012; 7:00 pm, WHIO		at Richmond	L 71–82	18–11 (8–7)	Robins Center (5,524); Richmond, VA
March 3, 2012; 12:00 pm		George Washington	W 75–59	19–11 (9–7)	UD Arena (12,901); Dayton, OH
Atlantic 10 tournament
March 6, 2012; 7:00 pm	(6)	(11) George Washington; First Round	W 67–50	20–11	UD Arena (6,049); Dayton, OH
March 9, 2012; 9:00 pm, CBSSN	(6)	vs. (3) Xavier; Quarterfinals	L 69–70	20–12	Boardwalk Hall (5,955); Atlantic City, NJ
NIT
March 13, 2012*; 7:30 pm, ESPN	(2)	at (7) Iowa; First Round	L 75–84	20–13	Carver–Hawkeye Arena (13,190); Iowa City, IA
*Non-conference game. ^{#}Rankings from AP Poll. (#) Tournament seedings in parentheses. All times are in Eastern Time.
