= 2011–12 George Washington Colonials men's basketball team =

American college basketball season

2011–12 George Washington Colonials men's basketball
- Conference: Atlantic 10 Conference
- Record: 10–21 (5–11 A-10)
- Head coach: Mike Lonergan (1st season)
- Assistant coaches: Hajj Turner; Pete Strickland; Kevin Sutton
- Home arena: Charles E. Smith Athletic Center

2011–12 Atlantic 10 men's basketball standings
	Conf.				Overall
Team	W		L	PCT	W		L	PCT
Temple	13	–	3	.813	24	–	8	.750
Saint Louis	12	–	4	.750	26	–	8	.765
Xavier	10	–	6	.625	23	–	13	.639
St. Bonaventure†	10	–	6	.625	20	–	12	.625
UMass	9	–	7	.563	26	–	11	.703
La Salle	9	–	7	.563	21	–	13	.618
Dayton	9	–	7	.563	20	–	13	.606
Saint Joseph's	9	–	7	.563	20	–	14	.588
Duquesne	7	–	9	.438	16	–	15	.516
Richmond	7	–	9	.438	16	–	16	.500
Charlotte	5	–	11	.313	13	–	17	.433
George Washington	5	–	11	.313	10	–	21	.323
Rhode Island	4	–	12	.250	7	–	24	.226
Fordham	3	–	13	.188	10	–	19	.345
† 2012 Atlantic 10 Tournament winner As of March 13, 2012; Rankings from AP Poll

The 2011–12 George Washington Colonials men's basketball marked the first team to be coached by Mike Lonergan. Highlights of the season included a 64–48 win over the University of Maryland Eastern Shore Hawks in the season opener, marking the first victory for Lonergan as the coach at GW. After a 4–1 start the team struggled mightily, finishing 10–21 and 5–11 in the Atlantic 10 conference. The season ended with a first round loss to the Dayton Flyers, by a score of 67–50, in the 2012 Atlantic 10 men's basketball tournament.

== Roster ==
2012–13 George Washington Colonials men's basketball team
Players
Coaches

Pos.	#	Name	Height	Weight	Year	Hometown
F	00	Dwayne Smith	6 ft 6 in (1.98 m)	227 lb (103 kg)	Jr	Toronto, ON
G	3	Tony Taylor	6 ft 1 in (1.85 m)	192 lb (87 kg)	Sr	Sleepy Hollow, NY
G	4	Roy Ghantous	6 ft 0 in (1.83 m)	173 lb (78 kg)	Jr	Walpole, MA
G	5	Bryan Bynes	6 ft 3 in (1.91 m)	173 lb (78 kg)	Jr	Ft. Lauderdale, FL
G	10	Michael Conward	6 ft 3 in (1.91 m)	193 lb (88 kg)	Sr	Miami, FL
G	11	Dan Guest	6 ft 2 in (1.88 m)	212 lb (96 kg)	So	West Hartford, CT
F	12	David Pellom	6 ft 8 in (2.03 m)	220 lb (100 kg)	Jr	Wilmington, NC
F	13	Jabari Edwards	6 ft 10 in (2.08 m)	223 lb (101 kg)	Sr	Brooklyn, NY
G	14	Malik Tonkins	5 ft 5 in (1.65 m)	140 lb (64 kg)	Fr	Dunkirk, MD
G/F	15	Aaron Ware	6 ft 5 in (1.96 m)	208 lb (94 kg)	Sr	Los Angeles, CA
G	20	Lasan Kromah	6 ft 5 in (1.96 m)	202 lb (92 kg)	Jr	Greenbelt, MD
F	24	Jonathan Davis	6 ft 7 in (2.01 m)	215 lb (98 kg)	Fr	Simi Valley, CA
F	30	Nemanja Mikic	6 ft 8 in (2.03 m)	227 lb (103 kg)	So	Novi Sad, SRB
F	32	Isaiah Armwood	6 ft 9 in (2.06 m)	192 lb (87 kg)	Jr	Baltimore, MD
F	34	John Kopriva	6 ft 8 in (2.03 m)	207 lb (94 kg)	Fr	Milwaukee, WI

Head coach

- Mike Lonergan (Catholic)

Assistant coach(es)

- Hajj Turner (Louisville)
- Pete Strickland (Pittsburgh)
- Kevin Sutton (James Madison)

Legend

- (C) Team captain
- (S) Suspended
- (I) Ineligible
- (W) Walk-on
- Injured
- Current redshirt

Roster
Last update: 04 May 2019
