= Mark Schmidt =

American basketball coach (born 1963)

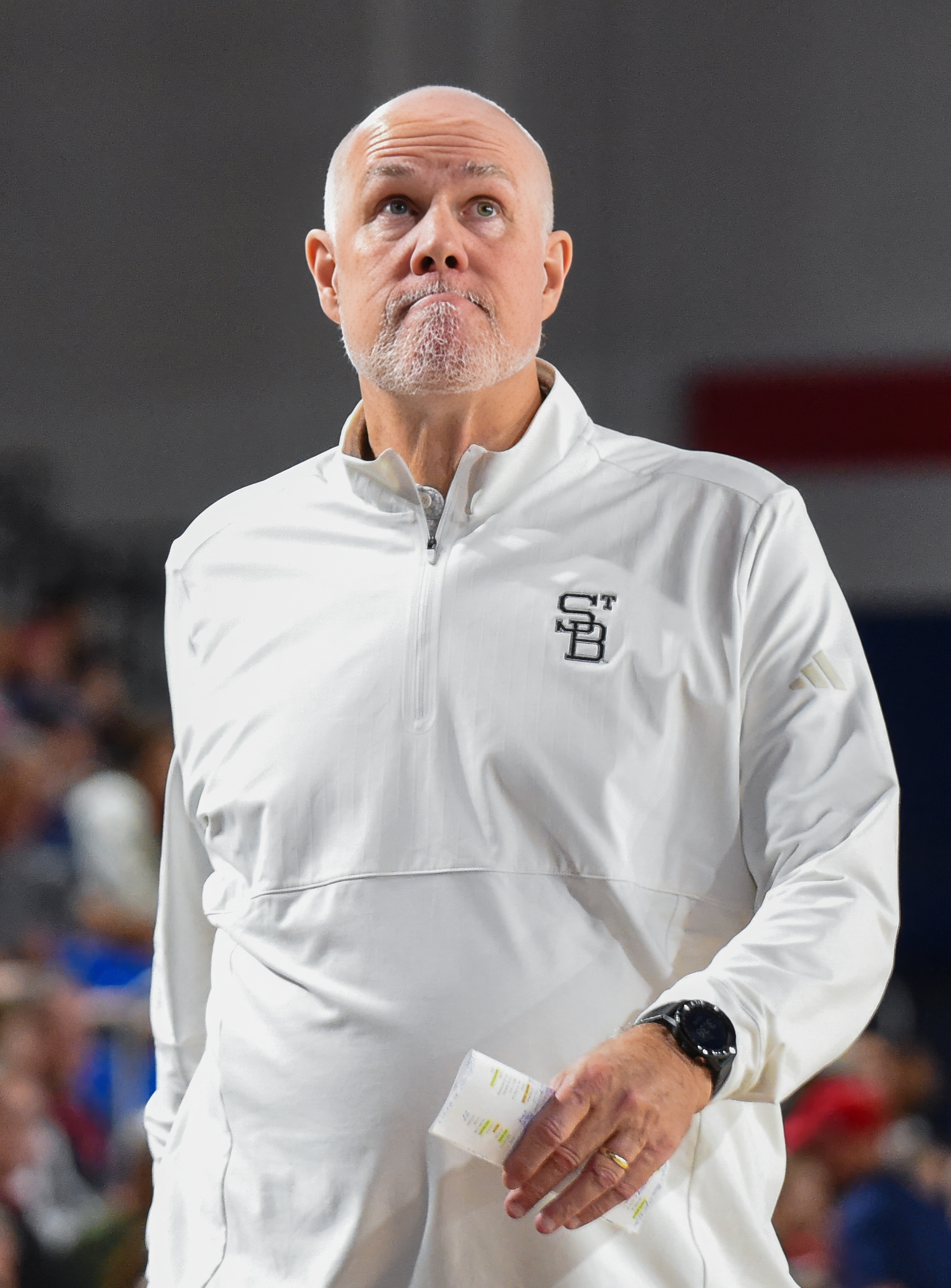
- Schmidt coaching St. Bonaventure in 2025

Biographical details
- Born: February 12, 1963 (age 63); North Attleboro, Massachusetts, U.S.

Playing career
- 1981–1985: Boston College

Coaching career (HC unless noted)
- 1989–1991: Saint Michael's (assistant)
- 1991–1993: Penn State (assistant)
- 1993–1994: Loyola (MD) (assistant)
- 1994–2001: Xavier (assistant)
- 2001–2007: Robert Morris
- 2007–2026: St. Bonaventure

Head coaching record
- Overall: 422–345 (.550)
- Tournaments: 1–3 (NCAA); 3–3 (NIT); 0–1 (CBI)

Accomplishments and honors

Championships
- 2 A-10 tournament (2012, 2021); 2 A-10 regular season (2016, 2021)

Awards
- 2x Atlantic 10 Coach of the Year (2016, 2021)

Mark Schmidt (born February 12, 1963) is an American former college basketball coach.

== Career ==
He took the job at the start of the 2007–08 season after holding the same position at Robert Morris University for six seasons (2001–2007), compiling a record of 82–90. Prior to becoming the head coach at Robert Morris, he served as an assistant coach at Xavier University under Skip Prosser from 1994 to 2001. During the 2008–09 season, he led St. Bonaventure to a 15–15 record, and an appearance in the Atlantic 10 postseason tournament, the school's first since 2005. Schmidt has led the Bonnies to Atlantic 10 Tournament Championships in 2012 and 2021 in addition to Atlantic 10 regular season championships in 2016 and 2021. In 2016, he was named Atlantic 10 Coach of the Year. He is the all-time wins leader in St. Bonaventure history passing Larry Weise (202 wins) on February 17, 2019. Schmidt has coached 24 players who went on to play professionally including Andrew Nicholson and Jaylen Adams. Schmidt is widely regarded as one of the most underrated coaches in college basketball.

He played collegiately for the Boston College Eagles from 1981 to 1985 under coaches Tom Davis and Gary Williams. He graduated from Bishop Feehan High School in Attleboro, Massachusetts in 1981, and is inducted in the Bishop Feehan Hall of Fame for his school record in the 3000m Steeplechase. He is still the school's second all-time leading scorer with a total of 1,450 points.

== Head coaching record ==
Record table
Season	Team	Overall	Conference	Standing	Postseason
Robert Morris Colonials (Northeast Conference) (2001–2007)
2001–02	Robert Morris	12–18	11–9	6th	
2002–03	Robert Morris	10–17	7–11	8th	
2003–04	Robert Morris	14–15	10–8	4th	
2004–05	Robert Morris	14–15	11–7	3rd	
2005–06	Robert Morris	15–14	10–8	5th	
2006–07	Robert Morris	17–11	9–9	4th	
Robert Morris:		82–90 (.477)	58–52 (.527)		
St. Bonaventure Bonnies (Atlantic 10 Conference) (2007–2026)
2007–08	St. Bonaventure	8–22	2–14	14th	
2008–09	St. Bonaventure	15–15	6–10	11th	
2009–10	St. Bonaventure	15–16	7–9	8th	
2010–11	St. Bonaventure	16–15	8–8	7th	CBI first round
2011–12	St. Bonaventure	20–12	10–6	4th	NCAA Division I Round of 64
2012–13	St. Bonaventure	14–15	7–9	11th	
2013–14	St. Bonaventure	18–15	6–10	9th	
2014–15	St. Bonaventure	18–13	10–8	T–7th	
2015–16	St. Bonaventure	22–9	14–4	T–1st	NIT first round
2016–17	St. Bonaventure	20–12	11–7	5th	
2017–18	St. Bonaventure	26–8	14–4	2nd	NCAA Division I Round of 64
2018–19	St. Bonaventure	18–16	12–6	4th	
2019–20	St. Bonaventure	19–12	11–7	T–5th	
2020–21	St. Bonaventure	16–5	11–4	1st	NCAA Division I Round of 64
2021–22	St. Bonaventure	23–10	12–5	4th	NIT semifinal
2022–23	St. Bonaventure	16–16	10–8	T–8th	
2023–24	St. Bonaventure	20–13	9–9	T–7th	
2024–25	St. Bonaventure	22–12	9–9	T–7th	NIT first round
2025–26	St. Bonaventure	17–17	4–14	T–13th	
St. Bonaventure:		340–255 (.571)	171–153 (.528)		
Total:		422–345 (.550)			
National champion Postseason invitational champion Conference regular season champion Conference regular season and conference tournament champion Division regular season champion Division regular season and conference tournament champion Conference tournament champion
