= 2011–12 Saint Louis Billikens men's basketball team =

American college basketball season

2011–12 Saint Louis Billikens men's basketball
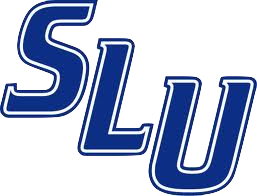

76 Classic tournament champions

NCAA Tournament, Round of 32
- Conference: Atlantic 10 Conference
- Record: 26–8 (12–4 A-10)
- Head coach: Rick Majerus
- Assistant coaches: Jim Crews; Chris Harriman; Jim Whitesell
- Home arena: Chaifetz Arena

2011–12 Atlantic 10 men's basketball standings
	Conf.				Overall
Team	W		L	PCT	W		L	PCT
Temple	13	–	3	.813	24	–	8	.750
Saint Louis	12	–	4	.750	26	–	8	.765
Xavier	10	–	6	.625	23	–	13	.639
St. Bonaventure†	10	–	6	.625	20	–	12	.625
UMass	9	–	7	.563	26	–	11	.703
La Salle	9	–	7	.563	21	–	13	.618
Dayton	9	–	7	.563	20	–	13	.606
Saint Joseph's	9	–	7	.563	20	–	14	.588
Duquesne	7	–	9	.438	16	–	15	.516
Richmond	7	–	9	.438	16	–	16	.500
Charlotte	5	–	11	.313	13	–	17	.433
George Washington	5	–	11	.313	10	–	21	.323
Rhode Island	4	–	12	.250	7	–	24	.226
Fordham	3	–	13	.188	10	–	19	.345
† 2012 Atlantic 10 Tournament winner As of March 13, 2012; Rankings from AP Poll

The 2011–12 Saint Louis Billikens men's basketball team represented Saint Louis University in the 2011–12 NCAA Division I men's basketball season. The Billikens were led by sixth year head coach Rick Majerus and played their home games at Chaifetz Arena. They are a member of the Atlantic 10 Conference. They finished the season 26–8, 12–4 in A-10 play to finish in second place. They were champions of the 2011 76 Classic. They lost in the semifinals of the Atlantic 10 Basketball tournament to Xavier. They received an at-large bid to the 2012 NCAA tournament where they defeated Memphis in the first round before falling in the second round to Michigan State.

== Roster ==
No.	Name	Pos.	Height	Weight	Year	Hometown (Prev. School)
3	Kwamain Mitchell	G	5–10	175	R Jr.	Milwaukee, Wis. (Dominican)
5	Jordair Jett	G	6–1	210	So.	St. Paul, Minn. (Notre Dame Prep.)
10	Emmanuel Tselentakis	G	6–4	190	Fr.	Thessaloniki, Greece (Anatolia College)
11	Mike McCall Jr.	G	6–0	165	So.	Chicago, Ill. (Foreman)
12	Grant Gehlen	F	6–3	160	R Fr.	Edina, Minn. (Cretin-Derham Hall)
13	Brian Daly	G	6–3	160	So.	Evanston, Ill. (Loyola Academy)
14	Brian Conklin	F	6–6	230	Sr.	Eugene, Ore. (North Eugene)
15	Jimmy Remke	F	6–4	N/A	Fr.	St. Paul, Minn. (Hill-Murray)
21	Dwayne Evans	F	6–5	205	So.	Bolingbrook, Ill. (Neuqua Valley)
23	Kyle Cassity	G	6–4	200	Sr.	Tamaroa, Ill (Pinckneyville)
24	Cody Ellis	F	6–8	240	Jr.	Perth, Australia (Institute Of Sport)
30	Jake Barnett	F	6–5	190	R So.	Wauwatosa, Wis. (East)
32	Cory Remekun	F	6–8	205	Jr.	Dallas, Tex. (Mesquite)
51	Rob Loe	F	6–11	240	So.	Auckland, New Zealand (Westlake)
54	John Manning	C	6–11	230	Fr.	Chantilly, Va. (Chantilly)
55	Grandy Glaze	F	6–6	230	Fr.	Toronto, Ontario (Notre Dame Prep.)

== Season schedule ==
Date time, TV	Rank^{#}	Opponent^{#}	Result	Record	Site (attendance) city, state
Exhibition
11/02/2011*; 7:00 pm		Cardinal Stritch	W 66–44	–	Chaifetz Arena (N/A); St. Louis, MO
11/05/2011*; 1:00 pm		St. Ambrose	W 72–61	–	Chaifetz Arena (N/A); St. Louis, MO
Non-conference regular season
11/11/2011*; 8:00 pm		Tennessee State	W 71–37	1–0	Chaifetz Arena (6,497); St. Louis, MO
11/15/2011*; 7:00 pm		at Southern Illinois	W 61–42	2–0	SIU Arena (4,272); Carbondale, IL
11/20/2011*; 11:00 am, CBSSN		Washington	W 77–64	3–0	Chaifetz Arena (6,761); St. Louis, MO
11/24/2011*; 1:00 pm, ESPNU		vs. Boston College; 76 Classic Tournament quarterfinals	W 62–51	4–0	Anaheim Convention Center (1,471); Anaheim, CA
11/25/2011*; 1:30 pm, ESPN2		vs. Villanova; 76 Classic Tournament semifinals	W 80–68	5–0	Anaheim Convention Center (2,087); Anaheim, CA
11/27/2011*; 8:00 pm, ESPN2		vs. Oklahoma; 76 Classic Championship	W 83–63	6–0	Anaheim Convention Center (2,637); Anaheim, CA
11/29/2011*; 9:00 pm	No. 23	at Loyola Marymount	L 68–75	6–1	Gersten Pavilion (2,012); Los Angeles, CA
12/03/2011*; 7:00 pm	No. 23	Portland	W 73–53	7–1	Chaifetz Arena (7,087); St. Louis, MO
12/07/2011*; 7:00 pm, FSMW		Vermont	W 62–43	8–1	Chaifetz Arena (5,677); St. Louis, MO
12/10/2011*; 1:00 pm		Illinois-Springfield	W 72–62	9–1	Chaifetz Arena (5,842); St. Louis, MO
12/17/2011*; 7:00 pm		Alabama State	W 65–35	10–1	Chaifetz Arena (6,574); St. Louis, MO
12/22/2011*; 7:00 pm		Arkansas State	W 70–46	11–1	Chaifetz Arena (7,354); St. Louis, MO
12/27/2011*; 7:00 pm, FSMW		Texas Southern	W 71–39	12–1	Chaifetz Arena (8,044); St. Louis, MO
12/31/2011*; 5:00 pm, The Mtn.		at New Mexico	L 60–64	12–2	The Pit (15,139); Albuquerque, NM
Atlantic 10 regular season
01/04/2012; 7:00 pm, KPLR		at Dayton	L 72–79 ^{OT}	12–3 (0–1)	UD Arena (11,815); Dayton, OH
01/07/2012; 7:00 pm		George Washington	W 78–56	13–3 (1–1)	Chaifetz Arena (9,021); St. Louis, MO
01/11/2012; 8:00 pm, CBSSN		Temple	L 67–72	13–4 (1–2)	Chaifetz Arena (8,760); St. Louis, MO
01/14/2012; 1:00 pm, CBSSR		at Charlotte	W 68–67	14–4 (2–2)	Dale F. Halton Arena (6,538); Charlotte, NC
01/21/2012; 7:00 pm, KPLR		Duquesne	W 68–41	15–4 (3–2)	Chaifetz Arena (8,656); St. Louis, MO
01/25/2012; 6:00 pm, FSMW		at Xavier	W 73–68	16–4 (4–2)	Cintas Center (10,153); Cincinnati, OH
01/28/2012; 1:00 pm, CBSSR		at Massachusetts	L 59–72	16–5 (4–3)	Mullins Center (8,399); Amherst, MA
02/01/2012; 7:00 pm		St. Bonaventure	W 86–62	17–5 (5–3)	Chaifetz Arena (6,346); St. Louis, MO
02/04/2012; 4:00 pm, FSMW+		Dayton	W 58–50	18–5 (6–3)	Chaifetz Arena (10,414); St. Louis, MO
02/08/2012; 7:30 pm, KPLR		at Saint Joseph's	W 72–60	19–5 (7–3)	Hagan Arena (3,751); Philadelphia, PA
02/11/2012; 1:00 pm		at La Salle	W 59–51	20–5 (8–3)	Tom Gola Arena (2,903); Philadelphia, PA
02/15/2012; 7:00 pm, KPLR		Richmond	W 64–50	21–5 (9–3)	Chaifetz Arena (7,459); St. Louis, MO
02/18/2012; 3:00 pm		Fordham	W 66–46	22–5 (10–3)	Chaifetz Arena (9,173); St. Louis, MO
02/25/2012; 1:00 pm, CBSSR		at Rhode Island	L 62–64	22–6 (10–4)	Ryan Center (4,065); Kingston, RI
02/28/2012; 8:00 pm, CBSSN		Xavier	W 70–59	23–6 (11–4)	Chaifetz Arena (10,441); St. Louis, MO
03/03/2012; 11:00 am		at Duquesne	W 75–60	24–6 (12–4)	A. J. Palumbo Center (2,901); Pittsburgh, PA
A-10 tournament
03/09/2012; 6:30 pm, CBSSN	(2)	vs. (7) La Salle; Quarterfinals	W 78–71	25–6	Boardwalk Hall (5,955); Atlantic City, NJ
03/10/2012; 3:30 pm, CBSSN	(2)	vs. (3) Xavier; Semifinals	L 64–71	25–7	Boardwalk Hall (6,784); Atlantic City, NJ
NCAA tournament
3/16/2012*; 5:50 pm, TBS	(9 W)	vs. (8 W) Memphis; First Round	W 61–54	26–7	Nationwide Arena (17,464); Columbus, OH
3/18/2012*; 2:10 pm, CBS	(9 W)	vs. (1 W) No. 5 Michigan State; Second Round	L 61–65	26–8	Nationwide Arena (17,425); Columbus, OH
*Non-conference game. ^{#}Rankings from AP Poll. (#) Tournament seedings in parentheses. All times are in Central Time (#) during NCAA Tournament is seed with Region.
