= 2011–12 Atlantic 10 Conference men's basketball season =

- League: NCAA Division I
- Sport: Basketball
- Teams: 14
- TV partner: CBS College Sports Network

Tournament

Basketball seasons
- ← 10–11 12–13 →

2011–12 Atlantic 10 men's basketball standings
	Conf.				Overall
Team	W		L	PCT	W		L	PCT
Temple	13	–	3	.813	24	–	8	.750
Saint Louis	12	–	4	.750	26	–	8	.765
Xavier	10	–	6	.625	23	–	13	.639
St. Bonaventure†	10	–	6	.625	20	–	12	.625
UMass	9	–	7	.563	26	–	11	.703
La Salle	9	–	7	.563	21	–	13	.618
Dayton	9	–	7	.563	20	–	13	.606
Saint Joseph's	9	–	7	.563	20	–	14	.588
Duquesne	7	–	9	.438	16	–	15	.516
Richmond	7	–	9	.438	16	–	16	.500
Charlotte	5	–	11	.313	13	–	17	.433
George Washington	5	–	11	.313	10	–	21	.323
Rhode Island	4	–	12	.250	7	–	24	.226
Fordham	3	–	13	.188	10	–	19	.345
† 2012 Atlantic 10 Tournament winner As of March 13, 2012; Rankings from AP Poll

The 2011–12 Atlantic 10 Conference men's basketball season marked the 36th season of Atlantic 10 Conference basketball. The 2012 Atlantic 10 men's basketball tournament was held for the sixth straight year at Boardwalk Hall in Atlantic City, New Jersey.

== Preseason ==
Atlantic 10 media day was held on October 13, 2011. Xavier, who had won at least a share of the last five regular season championships, was chosen as the preseason favorite by coaches and the media. They received 18 first-place votes, while Temple received four first-place votes and finished in second. Xavier's Tu Holloway was the reigning player of the year, having won the honor in the 2010–11 Atlantic 10 Conference men's basketball season.

=== Atlantic 10 preseason poll ===
Rank	Team	Votes
1	Xavier	304
2	Temple	287
3	Saint Louis	239
4	St. Bonaventure	217
5	Richmond	196
6	Dayton	168
7	Saint Joseph's	165
8	George Washington	163
9	Duquesne	151
10	Rhode Island	117
11	Charlotte	115
12	Massachusetts	107
13	La Salle	52
14	Fordham	29

=== Atlantic 10 preseason teams ===
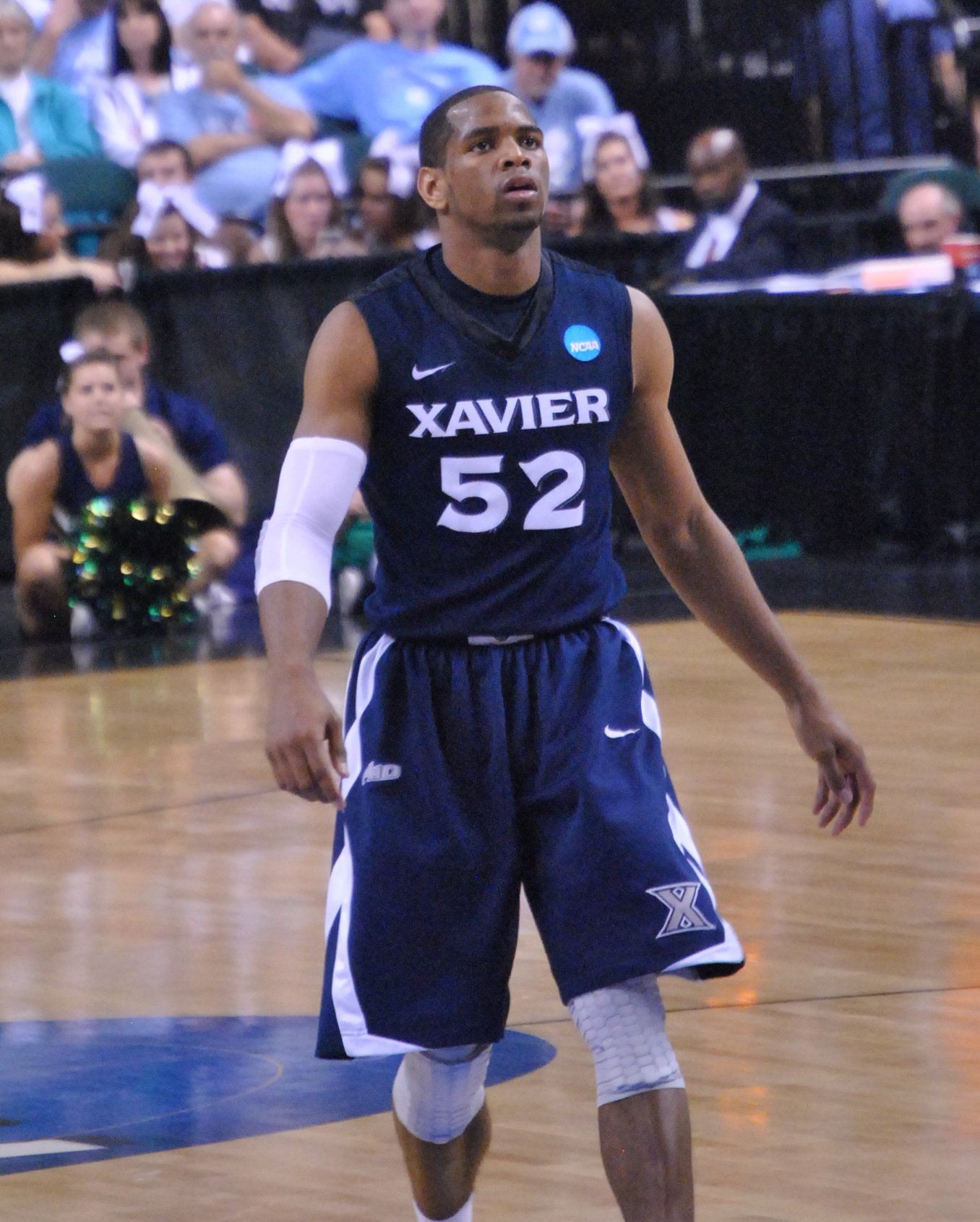
Tu Holloway

Award	Recipients
First Team	Juan Fernandez (Temple); Tu Holloway (Xavier); Ramone Moore (Temple); Andrew Nicholson (St. Bonaventure); Tony Taylor (George Washington)
Second Team	Kenny Frease (Xavier); Chris Gaston (Fordham); Chris Johnson (Dayton); Mark Lyons (Xavier); Kwamain Mitchell (Saint Louis)
Third Team	Chris Braswell (Charlotte); Derrio Green (Charlotte); Carl Jones (Saint Joseph's); T. J. McConnell (Duquesne); Scootie Randall (Temple)
Defensive Team	C. J. Aiken (Saint Joseph's); Darrius Garrett (Richmond); Tu Holloway (Xavier); T. J. McConnell (Duquesne); Andrew Nicholson (St. Bonaventure)
Rookie Team	Cady Lalanne (Massachusetts); Anthony Lee (Temple); Justin Martin (Xavier); Alonzo Nelson-Odada (Richmond); Dez Wells (Xavier); Jerrell Wright (La Salle)

=== Preseason watchlists ===
	Wooden	Naismith
Tu Holloway (Xavier)	✓	✓
Andrew Nicholson (St. Bonaventure)	✓	✓

== Rankings ==
Legend
	Improvement in ranking
	Drop in ranking
	No change in ranking
RV	Received votes but were not ranked in Top 25 of poll

		Pre	Wk 1	Wk 2	Wk 3	Wk 4	Wk 5	Wk 6	Wk 7	Wk 8	Wk 9	Wk 10	Wk 11	Wk 12	Wk 13	Wk 14	Wk 15	Wk 16	Wk 17	Wk 18	Final
Charlotte	AP																				
Charlotte	C																				
Dayton	AP										RV		RV								
Dayton	C										RV		RV								
Duquesne	AP																				
Duquesne	C																				
Fordham	AP																				
Fordham	C																				
George Washington	AP																				
George Washington	C																				
La Salle	AP																				
La Salle	C																				
Massachusetts	AP																				
Massachusetts	C																				
Rhode Island	AP																				
Rhode Island	C																				
Richmond	AP																				
Richmond	C																				
Saint Joseph's	AP																				
Saint Joseph's	C						RV	RV	RV												
Saint Louis	AP			RV	23	RV	RV	RV	RV	RV	RV				RV	RV	RV		RV		
Saint Louis	C			RV	25	RV	RV	RV	RV	RV						RV	RV		RV	RV	
St. Bonaventure	AP																			RV	
St. Bonaventure	C																				
Temple	AP	RV	RV	RV											RV	RV	22	23	21	RV	
Temple	C	RV	RV	RV										RV	RV	RV	22	25	24	RV	
Xavier	AP	14	13	12	11	8	8	14	RV	RV											
Xavier	C	15	14	12	11	8	9	15	RV												

== Conference awards & honors ==
=== Weekly honors ===
Throughout the conference regular season, the Atlantic 10 offices name a player of the week and rookie of the week each Monday.

Week	Player of the week	Rookie of the week
November 14, 2011	Jamal Wilson (Rhode Island)	Kendall Anthony (Richmond)
November 21, 2011	Carl Jones (Saint Joseph's)	Kendall Anthony (Richmond)
November 28, 2011	Kevin Dillard (Dayton); Brian Conklin (Saint Louis)	Jonathan Holton (Rhode Island)
December 5, 2011	Tu Holloway (Xavier)	Kendall Anthony (Richmond)
December 12, 2011	Carl Jones (Saint Joseph's); Ramone Moore (Temple)	Anthony Lee (Temple)
December 19, 2011	Demitrius Conger (St. Bonaventure); Langston Galloway (Saint Joseph's)	Alex Gavrilovic (Dayton)
December 26, 2011	Chris Gaston (Fordham); Darien Brothers (Richmond)	Jerrell Wright (La Salle)
January 2, 2012	B. J. Monteiro (Duquesne)	Mike Powell (Rhode Island); Anthony Lee (Temple)
January 9, 2012	Khalif Wyatt (Temple)	Mike Powell (Rhode Island); Bryan Smith (Fordham)
January 16, 2012	Andrew Nicholson (St. Bonaventure)	Pierriá Henry (Charlotte); Jonathan Holton (Rhode Island)
January 23, 2012	Matt Kavanaugh (Dayton); Tyreek Duren (La Salle)	Jonathan Holton (Rhode Island)
January 30, 2012	Ramon Galloway (La Salle); Raphiael Putney (Massachusetts)	Jonathan Holton (Rhode Island)
February 6, 2012	Ramon Moore (Temple)	Bryan Smith (Fordham)
February 13, 2012	Andrew Nicholson (St. Bonavenure); Ramon Moore (Temple)	Pierriá Henry (Charlotte)
February 20, 2012	Andrew Nicholson (St. Bonavenure); Tu Holloway (Xavier)	Maxie Esho (Massachusetts)
February 27, 2012	Andrew Nicholson (St. Bonavenure)	Dez Wells (Xavier)
March 5, 2012	Darien Brothers (Richmond)	Kendall Anthony (Richmond)

=== Atlantic 10 All-Conference teams ===
Award	Recipients
Coach of the Year	Fran Dunphy (Temple)
Player of the Year	Andrew Nicholson (St. Bonaventure)
Defensive Player of the Year	C.J. Aiken (Saint Joseph's)
Rookie of the Year	Kendall Anthony (Richmond)
Sixth Man of the Year	Ronald Roberts (Saint Joseph's)
Chris Daniels Most Improved Player of the Year	Earl Pettis (La Salle)
All-Academic Team	Luke Fabrizius (Dayton); Nemanja Mikic (George Washington); Brian Conklin (Saint Louis); Kyle Cassity (Saint Louis); Juan Fernandez (Temple)
First Team	Chaz Williams (Massachusetts); Andrew Nicholson; Brian Conklin (Saint Louis); Ramone Moore (Temple); Tu Holloway (Xavier)
Second Team	Kevin Dillard (Dayton); Chris Gaston (Fordham); Ramon Galloway (La Salle); Langston Galloway (Saint Joseph's); Khalif Wyatt (Temple)
Third Team	Chris Braswell (Charlotte); T. J. McConnell (Duquesne); Kwamain Mitchell (Saint Louis); Juan Fernandez (Temple); Mark Lyons (Xavier)
Honorable Mention	Chris Johnson (Dayton); Earl Pettis (La Salle); Carl Jones (Saint Joseph's); Halil Kanacevic (Saint Joseph's)
All-Defensive Team	T. J. McConnell (Duquesne); Darrius Garrett (Richmond); Andrew Nicholson (St. Bonaventure); C.J. Aiken (Saint Joseph's); Jordair Jett (Saint Louis)
All-Rookie Team	Pierriá Henry (Charlotte); Jerrell Wright (La Salle); Jonathan Holton (Rhode Island); Kendall Anthony (Richmond); Dezmine Wells (Xavier)
