= 2011–12 Richmond Spiders men's basketball team =

American college basketball season

2011–12 Richmond Spiders men's basketball
- Conference: Atlantic 10 Conference
- Record: 16–16 (7–9 A-10)
- Head coach: Chris Mooney (7th season)
- Assistant coaches: Kevin McGeehan (7th season); Jamal Brunt (5th season); Rob Jones (4th season)
- Home arena: Robins Center

2011–12 Atlantic 10 men's basketball standings
	Conf.				Overall
Team	W		L	PCT	W		L	PCT
Temple	13	–	3	.813	24	–	8	.750
Saint Louis	12	–	4	.750	26	–	8	.765
Xavier	10	–	6	.625	23	–	13	.639
St. Bonaventure†	10	–	6	.625	20	–	12	.625
UMass	9	–	7	.563	26	–	11	.703
La Salle	9	–	7	.563	21	–	13	.618
Dayton	9	–	7	.563	20	–	13	.606
Saint Joseph's	9	–	7	.563	20	–	14	.588
Duquesne	7	–	9	.438	16	–	15	.516
Richmond	7	–	9	.438	16	–	16	.500
Charlotte	5	–	11	.313	13	–	17	.433
George Washington	5	–	11	.313	10	–	21	.323
Rhode Island	4	–	12	.250	7	–	24	.226
Fordham	3	–	13	.188	10	–	19	.345
† 2012 Atlantic 10 Tournament winner As of March 13, 2012; Rankings from AP Poll

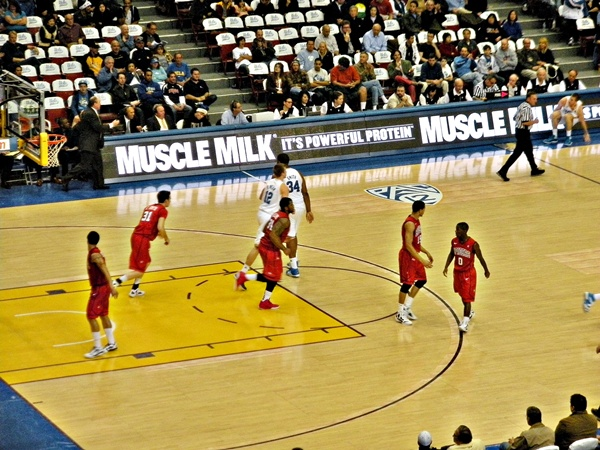
UCLA vs. Richmond, Los Angeles Sports Arena

The 2011–12 Richmond Spiders men's basketball team represented the University of Richmond in National Collegiate Athletic Association (NCAA) Division I college basketball during the 2011–12 season. Richmond competed as a member of the Atlantic 10 Conference (A-10) under seventh-year head basketball coach Chris Mooney and played its home games at the Robins Center.

== Preseason ==
=== Recruiting ===
College recruiting information
Name	Hometown	School	Height	Weight	Commit date
Luke Piotrowski; C	Atlantic City, New Jersey	Atlantic Christian School	6 ft 11 in (2.11 m)	205 lb (93 kg)	Aug 7, 2010
Luke Piotrowski; C	Recruit ratings: Scout: (89)				
Alonzo Nelson-Ododa; PF	Atlanta, Georgia	Norcross HS	6 ft 8 in (2.03 m)	200 lb (91 kg)	Oct 25, 2010
Alonzo Nelson-Ododa; PF	Recruit ratings: Scout: Rivals: (88)				
Trey Davis; SG	Richmond, Virginia	Benedictine HS	6 ft 4 in (1.93 m)	180 lb (82 kg)	Apr 23, 2010
Trey Davis; SG	Recruit ratings: Scout: Rivals: (87)				
Kendall Anthony; PG	Jackson, Tennessee	Liberty Technology Magnet HS	5 ft 8 in (1.73 m)	145 lb (66 kg)	Aug 28, 2010
Kendall Anthony; PG	Recruit ratings: Scout: Rivals: (80)				
Overall recruit ranking: Scout: NR Rivals: NR ESPN: NR
Note: In many cases, Scout, Rivals, 247Sports, On3, and ESPN may conflict in their listings of height and weight.; In these cases, the average was taken. ESPN grades are on a 100-point scale.; Sources: "Rivals.com 2011 Richmond Commitments". Rivals.; "Scout.com 2011 Richmond Commitments". Scout.; "ESPN 2011 Richmond Commitments". ESPN.; "Scout.com Team Recruiting Rankings". Scout.; "2011 Team Ranking". Rivals.

== Roster ==
2011–12 Richmond Spiders men's basketball team
Players
Coaches

Pos.	#	Name	Height	Weight	Year	Hometown
G	0	Kendall Anthony	5 ft 8 in (1.73 m)	140 lb (64 kg)	Fr	Jackson, Tennessee
F/C	1	Darrius Garrett	6 ft 9 in (2.06 m)	210 lb (95 kg)	Sr	Raleigh, North Carolina
G	2	Cedrick Lindsay	6 ft 1 in (1.85 m)	190 lb (86 kg)	So	Washington, D.C.
G	3	Darien Brothers	6 ft 3 in (1.91 m)	200 lb (91 kg)	Jr	Richmond, Virginia
G	4	Wayne Sparrow	6 ft 3 in (1.91 m)	180 lb (82 kg)	RS Fr	Baltimore, Maryland
F	5	Trey Davis (redshirt)	6 ft 5 in (1.96 m)	200 lb (91 kg)	Fr	Richmond, Virginia
G	10	Jonathan Benjamin	6 ft 1 in (1.85 m)	170 lb (77 kg)	Jr	Rochester, New York
F/C	11	Josh Duinker	6 ft 11 in (2.11 m)	230 lb (104 kg)	RS Sr	Sydney, Australia
G/F	13	Zak Estes	6 ft 4 in (1.93 m)	200 lb (91 kg)	Sr	Indianapolis, Indiana
F	15	Francis-Cedric Martel	6 ft 6 in (1.98 m)	205 lb (93 kg)	Sr	Montreal, Canada
G	22	Greg Robbins	6 ft 5 in (1.96 m)	220 lb (100 kg)	Jr	Wynnewood, Pennsylvania
G	24	Liam Billings	6 ft 4 in (1.93 m)	200 lb (91 kg)	RS Jr	Winter Park, Florida
C	25	Luke Piotrowski (redshirt)	6 ft 11 in (2.11 m)	240 lb (109 kg)	Fr	Atlantic City, New Jersey
G	30	Zachary Chu	5 ft 8 in (1.73 m)	160 lb (73 kg)	Fr	Dallas, Texas
F	31	Conor Smith	6 ft 9 in (2.06 m)	225 lb (102 kg)	RS Sr	Brookfield, Wisconsin
F	33	Alonzo Nelson-Ododa (redshirt)	6 ft 9 in (2.06 m)	210 lb (95 kg)	Fr	Atlanta, Georgia
F	34	Derrick Williams	6 ft 6 in (1.98 m)	270 lb (122 kg)	So	Harlem, New York

Head coach

- Chris Mooney (Princeton)

Assistant coach(es)

- Kevin McGeehan (Gettysburg)
- Jamal Brunt (Randolph-Macon)
- Rob Jones (Toccoa Falls)

Legend

- (C) Team captain
- (S) Suspended
- (I) Ineligible
- (W) Walk-on
- Injured
- Current redshirt

Roster
Last update: 2011-11-17

== Schedule ==
Date time, TV	Rank^{#}	Opponent^{#}	Result	Record	Site (attendance) city, state
Regular Season
November 11*; 7:30 pm		American	W 66–56	1–0	Robins Center (6,571); Richmond, Virginia
November 14*; 8:15 pm		at Davidson	L 61–74	1–1	Belk Arena (3,887); Davidson, North Carolina
November 17*; 7:00 pm		Hampton; Cancún Challenge	W 72–51	2–1	Robins Center (4,264); Richmond, Virginia
November 19*; 5:00 pm		Sacred Heart; Cancún Challenge	W 83–58	3–1	Robins Center (4,521); Richmond, Virginia
November 22*; 9:30 pm, CBS Sports Network		vs. Illinois; Cancún Challenge	L 61–70	3–2	Moon Palace Golf & Spa Resort; Cancún, Mexico
November 23*; 7:00 pm, CBS Sports Network		vs. Rutgers; Cancún Challenge	W 58–53	4–2	Moon Palace Golf & Spa Resort (862); Cancún, Mexico
November 30*; 7:30 pm		at William & Mary	W 92–61	5–2	Kaplan Arena (2,506); Williamsburg, Virginia
December 3*; 1:00 pm, ESPN3		at Wake Forest	W 70–62	6–2	LJVM Coliseum (7,813); Winston-Salem, North Carolina
December 9*; 8:00 pm, ESPN2		at VCU; Farm Bureau Insurance Black & Blue Classic	L 51–73	6–3	Siegel Center (7,686); Richmond, Virginia
December 14*; 3:00 pm		Iona	L 79–88	6–4	Robins Center (4,217); Richmond, Virginia
December 17*; 7:00 pm		at Bucknell	L 65–79	6–5	Sojka Pavilion (3,140); Lewisburg, Pennsylvania
December 20*; 7:00 pm		Old Dominion	W 90–82 ^{OT}	7–5	Robins Center (6,239); Richmond, Virginia
December 23*; 10:30 pm, Prime Ticket		at UCLA	L 63–71	7–6	LA Sports Arena (4,194); Los Angeles, California
December 28*; 7:00 pm		Liberty	W 77–61	8–6	Robins Center (4,471); Richmond, Virginia
December 30*; 4:00 pm		UNC Greensboro	W 78–58	9–6	Robins Center (4,497); Richmond, Virginia
January 4; 7:30 pm		at Charlotte	L 70–75	9–7 (0–1)	Halton Arena (4,591); Charlotte, North Carolina
January 7; 7:00 pm, CBS Sports Network		at Rhode Island	W 70–53	10–7 (1–1)	Ryan Center (3,611); Kingston, Rhode Island
January 14; 7:00 pm, CBS Sports Network		Temple	W 76–65	11–7 (2–1)	Robins Center (8,032); Richmond, Virginia
January 18; 7:00 pm		at George Washington	L 65–83	11–8 (2–2)	Smith Center (2,464); Washington, D.C.
January 21; 5:00 pm, CBS Sports Network		Massachusetts	L 68–79	11–9 (2–3)	Robins Center (7,231); Richmond, Virginia
January 25; 7:00 pm		Fordham	W 102–58	12–9 (3–3)	Robins Center (4,007); Richmond, Virginia
January 28; 7:00 pm		at St. Bonaventure	L 47–62	12–10 (3–4)	Reilly Center (4,589); St. Bonaventure, New York
February 1; 7:00 pm		Saint Joseph's	L 60–70	12–11 (3–5)	Robins Center (4,219); Richmond, Virginia
February 4; 7:00 pm, ESPNU		at Duquesne	L 72–81	12–12 (3–6)	A.J. Palumbo Center (4,481); Pittsburgh, Pennsylvania
February 8; 7:00 pm		La Salle	W 78–76	13–12 (4–6)	Robins Center (4,028); Richmond, Virginia
February 11; 5:00 pm, ESPNU		George Washington	L 67–69	13–13 (4–7)	Robins Center (8,011); Richmond, Virginia
February 15; 7:00 pm, KPLR-TV		at Saint Louis	L 50–64	13–14 (4–8)	Chaifetz Arena (7,459); St. Louis, Missouri
February 18; 6:00 pm		Charlotte	W 53–52	14–14 (5–8)	Robins Center (9,071); Richmond, Virginia
February 22; 7:00 pm		at Saint Joseph's	W 52–49	15–14 (6–8)	Hagan Arena (3,951); Philadelphia, Pennsylvania
February 25; 8:00 pm, ESPN2		at Xavier	L 57–65	15–15 (6–9)	Cintas Center (10,250); Cincinnati, Ohio
February 29; 7:00 pm, CBS Sports Network (regional)		Dayton	W 82–71	16–15 (7–9)	Robins Center (5,524); Richmond, Virginia
2012 Atlantic 10 men's basketball tournament
March 6; 7:00 pm		at La Salle; First Round	L 72–80	16–16	Tom Gola Arena (1,702); Philadelphia, Pennsylvania
*Non-conference game. ^{#}Rankings from AP Poll. (#) Tournament seedings in parentheses. All times are in Eastern Time.
