= 2011–12 Temple Owls men's basketball team =

American college basketball season

2011–12 Temple Owls men's basketball

A-10 Regular Season Champions Philadelphia Big 5 co-champions

NCAA Tournament, Round of 64
- Conference: Atlantic 10 Conference
- Record: 24–8 (13–3 A-10)
- Head coach: Fran Dunphy
- Assistant coaches: Dave Duke; Dwayne Killings; Shawn Trice
- Home arena: Liacouras Center

2011–12 Atlantic 10 men's basketball standings
	Conf.				Overall
Team	W		L	PCT	W		L	PCT
Temple	13	–	3	.813	24	–	8	.750
Saint Louis	12	–	4	.750	26	–	8	.765
Xavier	10	–	6	.625	23	–	13	.639
St. Bonaventure†	10	–	6	.625	20	–	12	.625
UMass	9	–	7	.563	26	–	11	.703
La Salle	9	–	7	.563	21	–	13	.618
Dayton	9	–	7	.563	20	–	13	.606
Saint Joseph's	9	–	7	.563	20	–	14	.588
Duquesne	7	–	9	.438	16	–	15	.516
Richmond	7	–	9	.438	16	–	16	.500
Charlotte	5	–	11	.313	13	–	17	.433
George Washington	5	–	11	.313	10	–	21	.323
Rhode Island	4	–	12	.250	7	–	24	.226
Fordham	3	–	13	.188	10	–	19	.345
† 2012 Atlantic 10 Tournament winner As of March 13, 2012; Rankings from AP Poll

The 2011–12 Temple Owls men's basketball team represented Temple University in the 2011–12 NCAA Division I men's basketball season. The team played their home games at the Liacouras Center, which has a capacity of 10,206; as well as one game each at the Palestra and Wells Fargo Center. They were in their 30th season as a member of the Atlantic 10 Conference. In their previous season, Temple compiled a record of 26–8 and reached the NCAA tournament. The team returned four starters from the previous season, but lost power forward Lavoy Allen to graduation. He was replaced by incoming recruit Will Cummings and transfer Dalton Pepper. Anthony Lee was eligible after red shirting in the previous year.

== Preseason ==
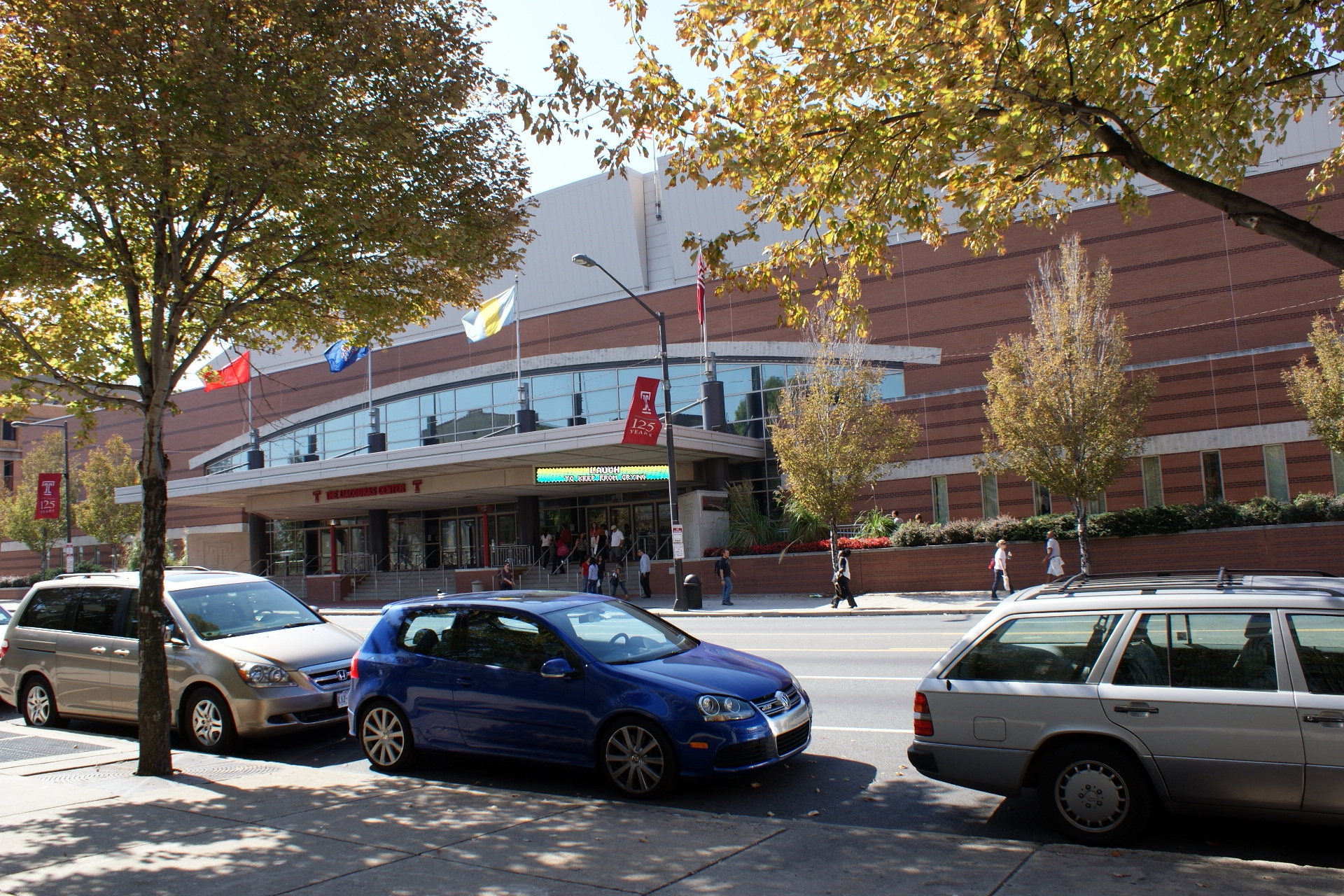
Temple played their home games at the Liacouras Center in Philadelphia.

In 2011–12, the Temple Owls men's basketball team were in their 30th season as a member of the Atlantic 10 Conference. Since 1997, the team has played their home games at the Liacouras Center, which has a capacity of 10,206. In the previous season, the Owls went 14–2 in Atlantic 10 play, earning a two seed in the 2011 Atlantic 10 men's basketball tournament, where they lost in the semifinals to Richmond. The team earned an at-large bid to the 2011 NCAA Division I men's basketball tournament as a seven seed, and defeated Penn State in the round of 64 on a last-second shot by guard Juan Fernandez. The win snapped coach Fran Dunphy's 11-game losing streak in the NCAA Tournament, the longest on record. Temple's season ended with a double overtime loss to San Diego State in the round of 32 as the Owls compiled a record of 26–8.

Temple lost starting power forward Lavoy Allen to graduation. As a senior, Allen placed third on the team in scoring with 11.6 points per game and led the team in rebounding with 8.6 rebounds per game. He was a three-time All-Atlantic 10 Defensive Team honoree and a two-time All-Atlantic 10 First Team selection. He finished his career as the school's all-time leading rebounder with 1,147 boards and ranks 24th on the career scoring list with 1,421 points. In the 2011 NBA draft, Allen was selected with the 50th overall pick by the Philadelphia 76ers. Reserve center Dutch Gaitley also graduated. After redshirting the 2010–11 season with foot injuries, forward Craig Williams transferred to Texas Christian University and was eligible to compete immediately.

Temple assistant Matt Langel accepted the Colgate head coaching job on April 28, 2011. Langel had coached at Temple since Fran Dunphy was hired in 2006. Langel was responsible for recruiting Juan Fernandez to Temple, once driving ten hours in a compact car to find him. He was replaced by Boston University assistant Dwayne Killings. Killings served as assistant director of basketball operations at Temple from 2006 to 2009. In his only season at Boston University, Killings helped the team win the 2011 America East men's basketball tournament and earn a bid to the NCAA Tournament.

On October 13, 2011. Temple was predicted to finish second in the Atlantic 10 behind Xavier and received four first-place votes. Ramone Moore and Juan Fernandez were Preseason First Team All-Conference selections, Scootie Randall was a Preseason Third Team All-Conference selection, and Anthony Lee was a Preseason All-Rookie Team selection. Jeff Goodman of CBS Sports named Temple Owls the second best team in the Atlantic 10 and highlighted the development of Michael Eric and Anthony Lee as factors for a successful season.

=== Recruiting ===
==== Incoming signees ====
The sole member of the Owls' 2011 recruiting class was Will Cummings, a point guard from Jacksonville, Florida who committed on September 4, 2010. He averaged 18.1 points, 8.1 assists, 4.0 steals per game as a senior at Providence School, in addition to carrying a 4.0 grade point average. The Jacksonville Times-Union named him the high school boys basketball player of the year. Cummings drew attention from Stanford, Miami (Fl.), and Boston College, but chose Temple because of their winning tradition.

In addition to Temple's recruiting class, the Owls signed transfer Dalton Pepper from West Virginia. Due to NCAA rules, he will be forced to sit out the 2011–12 season as a redshirt and will have two years of eligibility remaining. In his career at Pennsbury High School, Pepper scored a school-record 2,207 points, grabbed 962 rebounds, and garnered 2009 Pennsylvania Big School Player of the Year recognition from the Associated Press. In 62 games with the Mountaineers, Pepper averaged 3.5 points and 10.1 minutes per game and helped West Virginia reach the 2010 Final Four.

College recruiting
Name	Hometown	School	Height	Weight	Commit date
Will Cummings; PG	Jacksonville, Florida	Providence School (FL)	6 ft 1 in (1.85 m)	165 lb (75 kg)	Sep 4, 2010
Will Cummings; PG	Recruit ratings: Scout: Rivals: (91)				
Overall recruit ranking:
Note: In many cases, Scout, Rivals, 247Sports, On3, and ESPN may conflict in their listings of height and weight.; In these cases, the average was taken. ESPN grades are on a 100-point scale.; Sources: "Temple 2011 Basketball Commitments". Rivals.; "2011 Temple Basketball Commits". Scout.; "ESPN". ESPN.; "Scout.com Team Recruiting Rankings". Scout.; "2011 Team Ranking". Rivals.

== Roster ==
#	Name	Height	Weight (lbs.)	Position	Class	Hometown		High school
1	Khalif Wyatt	6 ft 4 in (1.93 m)	210 pounds (95 kg)	G	Jr.	Norristown, Pennsylvania	U.S.	Norristown HS
2	Will Cummings	6 ft 1 in (1.85 m)	165 pounds (75 kg)	G	Fr.	Jacksonville, Florida	U.S.	Providence School
3	Anthony Lee	6 ft 9 in (2.06 m)	205 pounds (93 kg)	F/C	Fr.	Orlando, Florida	U.S.	West Oaks Academy
4	Juan Fernandez	6 ft 4 in (1.93 m)	180 pounds (82 kg)	G	Sr.	Río Tercero, Córdoba	Argentina	Dr. Alexis Carrel HS
10	Ramone Moore	6 ft 4 in (1.93 m)	180 pounds (82 kg)	G	Sr.	Philadelphia, Pennsylvania	U.S.	South Philadelphia HS
11	T. J. DiLeo	6 ft 2 in (1.88 m)	195 pounds (88 kg)	G	Jr.	Cinnaminson, New Jersey	U.S.	Cinnaminson HS
15	Jimmy McDonnell	6 ft 10 in (2.08 m)	190 pounds (86 kg)	F	Fr.	Jackson, New Jersey	U.S.	Jackson Memorial HS
22	Aaron Brown	6 ft 5 in (1.96 m)	210 pounds (95 kg)	G	So.	Newark, New Jersey	U.S.	St. Benedict's Prep
25	Nick Pendergast	6 ft 5 in (1.96 m)	175 pounds (79 kg)	F	Fr.	Bridgewater, Connecticut	U.S.	Kent School
31	Jake Godino	6 ft 0 in (1.83 m)	170 pounds (77 kg)	G	Sr.	Chester, Pennsylvania	U.S.	Delaware County Christian School
32	Rahlir Hollis-Jefferson	6 ft 6 in (1.98 m)	200 pounds (91 kg)	F	Jr.	Chester, Pennsylvania	U.S.	Chester HS
33	Scootie Randall	6 ft 6 in (1.98 m)	205 pounds (93 kg)	F	Sr.	Philadelphia, Pennsylvania	U.S.	Communications Tech HS
50	Micheal Eric	6 ft 11 in (2.11 m)	240 pounds (110 kg)	F/C	Sr.	Lagos	Nigeria	Church Farm School
–	Dalton Pepper	6 ft 5 in (1.96 m)	230 pounds (100 kg)	G	Jr.	Levittown, Pennsylvania	U.S.	Pennsbury HS

== Schedule ==
2011–12 game log
November

Game	Date	Team	Score	High points	High rebounds	High assists	Location Attendance	Record
1	November 14	Penn	W 73–67 (OT)	Juan Fernandez – 19	Micheal Eric – 10	Juan Fernandez – 5	The Palestra, Philadelphia, PA	1–0
2	November 17	Western Michigan	W 69–55	Ramone Moore – 15	Eric – 15	Fernandez – 6	José Miguel Agrelot Coliseum, San Juan, PR	2–0
3	November 18	Purdue	L 85–77	Moore – 27	Eric – 8	Moore/Rahlir Hollis-Jefferson/T.J. DiLeo – 3	José Miguel Agrelot Coliseum, San Juan, PR	2–1
4	November 20	Wichita State	W 78–74 (OT)	Moore – 23	Eric – 12	Khalif Wyatt – 4	José Miguel Agrelot Coliseum, San Juan, PR	3–1
5	November 27	Bowling Green	L 67–64	Wyatt – 19	Anthony Lee – 9	Wyatt/Moore – 4	Stroh Center, Bowling Green, OH	3–2

December

Game	Date	Team	Score	High points	High rebounds	High assists	Location Attendance	Record
6	December 3	Central Michigan	W 86–74	Wyatt – 23	Moore – 8	Wyatt – 9	Liacouras Center, Philadelphia, PA	4–2
7	December 7	Toledo	W 77–58	Aaron Brown – 19	Lee – 9	Moore – 7	Savage Arena, Toledo, OH	5–2
8	December 10	Villanova	W 78–67	Moore – 32	Hollis-Jefferson – 14	Fernandez – 4	Liacouras Center, Philadelphia, PA	6–2
9	December 17	Texas	L 65–77				Frank Erwin Center, Austin, TX	6–3
10	December 19	Rice	W 77–70				Tudor Fieldhouse, Houston, TX	7–3
11	December 28	Buffalo	W 87–85				Liacouras Center, Philadelphia, PA	8–3
12	December 30	Delaware	W 66–63				Bob Carpenter Center, Newark, DE	9–3

January

Game	Date	Team	Score	High points	High rebounds	High assists	Location Attendance	Record
13	January 4	Duke	W 78–73				Wells Fargo Center, Philadelphia, PA	10–3
14	January 7	Dayton	L 77-87				Liacouras Center, Philadelphia, PA	10-4(0-1)
15	January 11	Saint Louis	W 72-67				Chaifetz Arena, St. Louis, MO	11-4(1-1)
16	January 14	Richmond	L 65-76				Robins Center, Richmond, VA	11-5(1-2)
17	January 18	La Salle	W 76-70				Liacouras Center, Philadelphia, PA	12-5(2-2)
18	January 21	Maryland	W 73-60				The Palestra, Philadelphia, PA	13-5(3-2)
19	January 25	Charlotte	W 79-57				Dale F. Halton Arena, Charlotte, NC	14-5(4-2)
20	January 28	Saint Joseph's	W 78-60				Liacouras Center, Philadelphia, PA	15-5(5-2)

February

Game	Date	Team	Score	High points	High rebounds	High assists	Location Attendance	Record
21	February 1	Fordham	W 78-60				Liacouras Center, Philadelphia, PA	16-5(6-2)
22	February 4	Rhode Island	W 73-56				Ryan Center, Kingston, RI	17-5(7-2)
23	February 8	George Washington	W 79-72				Liacouras Center, Philadelphia, PA	18-5(8-2)
24	February 11	Xavier	W 85-72				Liacouras Center, Philadelphia, PA	19-5(9-2)
25	February 15	St. Bonaventure	W 76-70				Reilly Center, Olean, NY	20-5(10-2)
26	February 18	Duquesne	W 78-59				Liacouras Center, Philadelphia, PA	21-5(11-2)
27	February 22	La Salle	W 80-79 OT				Tom Gola Arena, Philadelphia, PA	22-5(12-2)
28	February 25	Saint Joseph's	L 72-82				Hagan Arena, Philadelphia, PA	22-6(12-3)
29	February 29	UMass	W 90-88 OT				Liacouras Center, Philadelphia, PA	23-6(13-3)

March

Game	Date	Team	Score	High points	High rebounds	High assists	Location Attendance	Record
30	March 3	Fordham	W 80-60				Rose Hill Gymnasium, Bronx, NY	24-6(14-3)
31	March 9	UMass	L 71-77				Boardwalk Hall, Atlantic City, NJ	24-7
32	March 16	(12) South Florida	L 44-58				Nashville, TN	24-8

2011–12 team schedule

== Season ==
=== Preconference season ===
Behind Juan Fernandez's 19 points, Temple began their season with a 73–67 overtime victory over Penn on November 14, 2011.

== Rankings ==
Ranking movement Legend: ██ Increase in ranking. ██ Decrease in ranking.
Poll	Pre	Wk 1	Wk 2	Wk 3	Wk 4	Wk 5	Wk 6	Wk 7	Wk 8	Wk 9	Wk 10	Wk 11	Wk 12	Wk 13	Wk 14	Wk 15	Wk 16	Wk 17	Wk 18	Final
AP	28	26	33																	
Coaches	29	28	33T																	

== Awards and honors ==
Juan Fernandez

- Preseason All-Atlantic 10 First Team

Ramone Moore

- Preseason All-Atlantic 10 First Team

Scootie Randall

- Preseason All-Atlantic 10 Third Team

Anthony Lee

- Preseason All-Atlantic 10 Rookie Team
