= 2011–12 Fordham Rams men's basketball team =

American college basketball season

2011–12 Fordham Rams men's basketball
- Conference: Atlantic 10
- Record: 10–18 (3–12 A-10)
- Head coach: Tom Pecora
- Assistant coaches: David Duke; John Morton; Michael Kelly
- Home arena: Rose Hill Gymnasium

2011–12 Atlantic 10 men's basketball standings
	Conf.				Overall
Team	W		L	PCT	W		L	PCT
Temple	13	–	3	.813	24	–	8	.750
Saint Louis	12	–	4	.750	26	–	8	.765
Xavier	10	–	6	.625	23	–	13	.639
St. Bonaventure†	10	–	6	.625	20	–	12	.625
UMass	9	–	7	.563	26	–	11	.703
La Salle	9	–	7	.563	21	–	13	.618
Dayton	9	–	7	.563	20	–	13	.606
Saint Joseph's	9	–	7	.563	20	–	14	.588
Duquesne	7	–	9	.438	16	–	15	.516
Richmond	7	–	9	.438	16	–	16	.500
Charlotte	5	–	11	.313	13	–	17	.433
George Washington	5	–	11	.313	10	–	21	.323
Rhode Island	4	–	12	.250	7	–	24	.226
Fordham	3	–	13	.188	10	–	19	.345
† 2012 Atlantic 10 Tournament winner As of March 13, 2012; Rankings from AP Poll

The 2011–12 Fordham Rams men's basketball team represented Fordham University during the 2011–12 NCAA Division I men's basketball season. The team was coached by Tom Pecora in his second year at the school. Fordham Rams home games were played at Rose Hill Gymnasium and the team is a member of the Atlantic 10 Conference.

On October 13, 2011, coaches and media predicted Fordham to finish in last in the Atlantic 10, receiving 29 votes. Chris Gaston was named to the Preseason All-Atlantic 10 Second Team.

== Roster ==
2011–12 Fordham Rams men's basketball team
Players
Coaches

Pos.	#	Name	Height	Weight	Year	Hometown
G	1	Branden Frazier	6 ft 3 in (1.91 m)	170 lb (77 kg)	So	Brooklyn, New York
G	3	Devon McMillan	5 ft 10 in (1.78 m)	165 lb (75 kg)	Fr	Brooklyn, New York
G	4	Ryan Hage	6 ft 2 in (1.88 m)	180 lb (82 kg)	Sr	Brockport, New York
G	5	Jeffrey Short	6 ft 4 in (1.93 m)	180 lb (82 kg)	Fr	Bronx, New York
F	10	Luka Zivkovic	6 ft 8 in (2.03 m)	215 lb (98 kg)	Fr	Belgrade, Serbia
G	14	Lamount Samuell	6 ft 4 in (1.93 m)	175 lb (79 kg)	So	Brooklyn, New York
G	20	Jared Fay	6 ft 3 in (1.91 m)	170 lb (77 kg)	Fr	Lynn, Massachusetts
G	21	Alberto Estwick	6 ft 4 in (1.93 m)	200 lb (91 kg)	Sr	Brooklyn, New York
F	23	Marvin Dominique	6 ft 7 in (2.01 m)	215 lb (98 kg)	So	Miramar, Florida
G	24	Bryan Smith	6 ft 2 in (1.88 m)	195 lb (88 kg)	Fr	Brooklyn, New York
G	32	DC Gaitley	6 ft 2 in (1.88 m)	190 lb (86 kg)	Fr	Haverford, Pennsylvania
F	33	Chris Gaston	6 ft 7 in (2.01 m)	220 lb (100 kg)	Jr	Union City, New Jersey
G	35	Khalid Robinson	6 ft 3 in (1.91 m)	200 lb (91 kg)	So	Bronx, New York
C	42	Ryan Canty	6 ft 9 in (2.06 m)	230 lb (104 kg)	Fr	Danvers, Massachusetts
C	55	Kervin Bristol	6 ft 10 in (2.08 m)	225 lb (102 kg)	Sr	Brooklyn, New York

Head coach

- Tom Pecora (Adelphi)

Assistant coach(es)

- David Duke (Albany)
- John Morton (Seton Hall)
- Michael Kelly (Haverford)

Legend

- (C) Team captain
- (S) Suspended
- (I) Ineligible
- (W) Walk-on
- Injured
- Current redshirt

== Schedule and results ==
Date time, TV	Rank^{#}	Opponent^{#}	Result	Record	Site (attendance) city, state
Exhibition
11/07/2011*; 7:00pm		Northwood	L 71–77	–	Rose Hill Gymnasium (725); Bronx, NY
Regular Season
11/12/2011*; 4:00pm		at No. 5 Syracuse	L 53–78	0–1	Carrier Dome (22,906); Syracuse, NY
11/18/2011*; 7:00pm		Binghamton	W 64–49	1–1	Rose Hill Gymnasium (2,162); Bronx, NY
11/26/2011*; 4:00pm		at Loyola	L 50–64	1–2	Joseph J. Gentile Arena (1,947); Chicago, IL
11/29/2011*; 7:00pm		Colgate	W 79–69	2–2	Rose Hill Gymnasium (1,342); Bronx, NY
12/01/2011*; 7:00pm		Lehigh	L 60–78	2–3	Rose Hill Gymnasium (1,397); Bronx, NY
12/05/2011*; 7:00pm		Hampton	W 54–53	3–3	Rose Hill Gymnasium (1,395); Bronx, NY
12/07/2011*; 7:00pm		at Manhattan; Battle of the Bronx	L 47–81	3–4	Draddy Gymnasium (2,345); Bronx, NY
12/10/2011*; 7:00pm		at Monmouth	L 65–80	3–5	Multipurpose Activity Center (1,810); West Long Branch, NJ
12/12/2011*; 7:00pm, TWCS		at Siena	W 74–59	4–5	Times Union Center (5,476); Albany, NY
12/17/2011*; 2:30pm		at St. John's; Rivalry	L 50–56	4–6	Madison Square Garden (11,090); New York City, NY
12/22/2011*; 7:00pm		Texas State	W 81–70	5–6	Rose Hill Gymnasium (921); Bronx, NY
12/29/2011*; 8:00pm, CBSSN		Georgia Tech	W 72–66	6–6	Rose Hill Gymnasium (3,200); Bronx, NY
01/03/2012*; 7:00pm		No. 22 Harvard	W 60–54	7–6	Rose Hill Gymnasium (2,891); Bronx, NY
01/05/2012; 7:00pm		at Massachusetts	L 76–80	7–7 (0–1)	Mullins Center (2,846); Amherst, MA
01/07/2012; 12:00pm, YES		Xavier	L 59–67	7–8 (0–2)	Rose Hill Gymnasium (3,200); Bronx, NY
01/11/2012; 7:00pm		at Saint Joseph's	L 62–80	7–9 (0–3)	Hagan Arena (3,765); Philadelphia, PA
01/18/2012; 7:00pm		Rhode Island	W 66–64	8–9 (1–3)	Rose Hill Gymnasium (1,996); Bronx, NY
01/21/2012; 12:00pm, CBSSR		at St. Bonaventure	L 51–95	8–10 (1–4)	Reilly Center (4,119); St. Bonaventure, NY
01/25/2012; 7:00pm		at Richmond	L 58–102	8–11 (1–5)	Robins Center (4,007); Richmond, VA
01/28/2012; 1:00pm, YES		George Washington	W 63–58	9–11 (2–5)	Rose Hill Gymnasium (2,641); Bronx, NY
02/01/2012; 7:00pm		at Temple	L 60–78	9–12 (2–6)	Liacouras Center (4,080); Philadelphia, PA
02/04/2012; 1:00pm, YES		Charlotte	L 62–69	9–13 (2–7)	Rose Hill Gymnasium (2,493); Bronx, NY
02/11/2012; 1:00pm, YES		Dayton	L 70–72 ^{OT}	9–14 (2–8)	Rose Hill Gymnasium (3,200); Bronx, NY
02/15/2012; 7:00pm		at Duquesne	L 67–77	9–15 (2–9)	A.J. Palumbo Center (2,517); Pittsburgh, PA
02/18/2012; 4:00pm		at Saint Louis	L 46–66	9–16 (2–10)	Chaifetz Arena (9,173); St. Louis, MO
02/22/2012; 7:00pm		St. Bonaventure	L 63–89	9–17 (2–11)	Rose Hill Gymnasium (2,306); Bronx, NY
02/25/2012; 1:00pm, YES		La Salle	W 67–62	10–17 (3–11)	Rose Hill Gymnasium (2,796); Bronx, NY
02/29/2012; 7:00pm		at Rhode Island	L 58–78	10–18 (3–12)	Ryan Center (3,180); Kingston, RI
03/03/2012; 4:00pm		No. 23 Temple	L 60–80	10–19 (3–13)	Rose Hill Gymnasium (3,200); Bronx, NY
*Non-conference game. ^{#}Rankings from AP Poll. (#) Tournament seedings in parentheses.
