= 2011–12 St. Bonaventure Bonnies men's basketball team =

American college basketball season

2011–12 St. Bonaventure Bonnies men's basketball
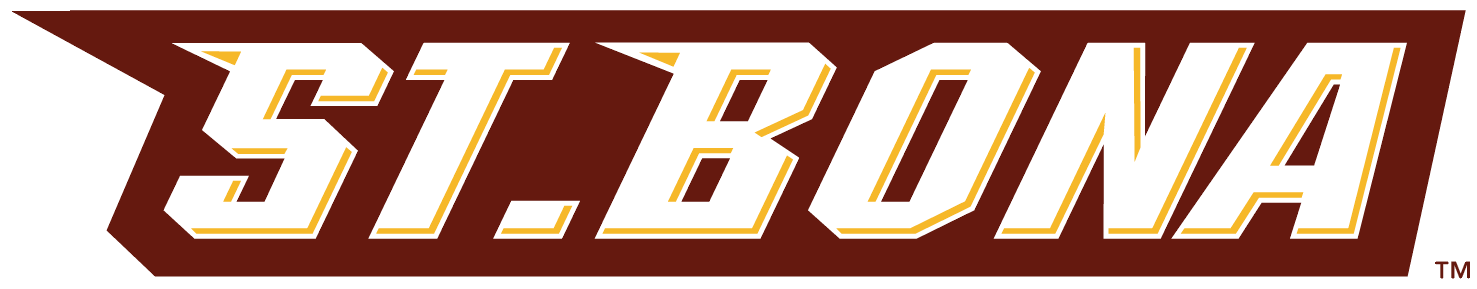

Atlantic 10 tournament champions

NCAA Tournament, Round of 64
- Conference: Atlantic 10 Conference
- Record: 20–12 (10–6 A-10)
- Head coach: Mark Schmidt (5th season)
- Assistant coaches: Dave Moore; Jeff Massey; Steve Curran
- Home arena: Reilly Center

2011–12 Atlantic 10 men's basketball standings
	Conf.				Overall
Team	W		L	PCT	W		L	PCT
Temple	13	–	3	.813	24	–	8	.750
Saint Louis	12	–	4	.750	26	–	8	.765
Xavier	10	–	6	.625	23	–	13	.639
St. Bonaventure†	10	–	6	.625	20	–	12	.625
UMass	9	–	7	.563	26	–	11	.703
La Salle	9	–	7	.563	21	–	13	.618
Dayton	9	–	7	.563	20	–	13	.606
Saint Joseph's	9	–	7	.563	20	–	14	.588
Duquesne	7	–	9	.438	16	–	15	.516
Richmond	7	–	9	.438	16	–	16	.500
Charlotte	5	–	11	.313	13	–	17	.433
George Washington	5	–	11	.313	10	–	21	.323
Rhode Island	4	–	12	.250	7	–	24	.226
Fordham	3	–	13	.188	10	–	19	.345
† 2012 Atlantic 10 Tournament winner As of March 13, 2012; Rankings from AP Poll

The 2011–12 St. Bonaventure Bonnies men's basketball team represented St. Bonaventure University during the 2011–12 NCAA Division I men's basketball season. The Bonnies, led by fifth year head coach Mark Schmidt, played their home games at the Reilly Center and are members of the Atlantic 10 Conference. They finished the season 20–12, 10–6 in A-10 to finish in a tie for third place. They were champions of the A-10 Basketball tournament to earn the conference's automatic bid to the 2012 NCAA tournament where they lost in the second round to Florida State.

== Previous season ==
The Bonnies were seventh in the Atlantic 10 Conference. They also made the first round of the College Basketball Invitational, where they lost to UCF.

== Offseason ==
=== Departures ===
Name	Number	Pos.	Height	Weight	Year	Hometown	Reason for Departure
Ogo Adegboye	0	G	6'1"	185	Senior	Ibadan, Nigeria	Graduated

=== Incoming transfers ===
Name	Num	Pos.	Height	Weight	Year	Hometown	Previous school
Eric Mosley	2	G	5'10"	170	Junior	Louisville, Kentucky	Cincinnati State
Charlon Kloof	3	G	6'3"	195	Sophomore	Paramaribo, Suriname	Guilford Technical CC
Chris Johnson	3	G/F	6–5	205	Junior	North Preston, Nova Scotia	Kilgore

== Roster ==
Number	Name	Position	Height	Weight	Year	Hometown
2	Eric Mosley	Guard	5–10	170	Junior	Louisville, Kentucky
3	Charlon Kloof	Guard	6–3	195	Sophomore	Paramaribo, Suriname
5	Jordan Gathers	Guard	6–3	200	Freshman	Los Angeles, California
10	Danny Farrell	Guard	6–0	170	Sophomore	Binghamton, New York
11	Demitrius Conger	Forward	6–6	205	Junior	Brooklyn, New York
12	Zach Moore	Forward	6–3	210	Senior	Olean, New York
21	Youssou Ndoye	Center	6–11	235	Freshman	Dakar, Senegal
23	Chris Johnson	Guard/Forward	6–5	205	Junior	North Preston, Nova Scotia
24	Matthew Wright	Guard	6–4	200	Sophomore	Toronto, Ontario
32	Michael Davenport	Guard	6–5	210	Senior	Cincinnati, Ohio
33	Marquise Simmons	Forward	6–8	230	Junior	Capitol Heights, Maryland
43	Da'Quan Cook	Forward	6–8	235	Senior	Elizabeth, New Jersey
44	Andrew Nicholson	Forward	6–9	240	Senior	Mississauga, Ontario
45	Jake Houseknecht	Center	6–9	210	Junior	Olean, New York

== Schedule ==
Date time, TV	Rank^{#}	Opponent^{#}	Result	Record	Site (attendance) city, state
Exhibition
11/04/2011*; 7:00 pm		Mansfield	W 87–61		Reilly Center; St. Bonaventure, NY
Regular season
11/11/2011*; 7:00 pm		Cornell	W 79–58	1–0	Reilly Center (4,423); St. Bonaventure, NY
11/18/2011*; 7:00 pm		at Cleveland State	L 64–67	1–1	Wolstein Center (3,073); Cleveland, OH
11/21/2011*; 7:00 pm		at Siena; Franciscan Cup	W 64–58	2–1	Times Union Center (6,067); Albany, NY
11/27/2011*; 6:00 pm		at Virginia Tech	L 64–73	2–2	Cassell Coliseum (8,710); Blacksburg, VA
12/01/2011*; 7:00 pm		Arkansas State	L 52–58	2–3	Reilly Center (3,488); St. Bonaventure, NY
12/03/2011*; 7:00 pm, TWCSN		at Buffalo	W 66–60	3–3	Alumni Arena (3,882); Amherst, NY
12/07/2011*; 9:00 pm, ESPN2		at No. 24 Illinois	L 43–48	3–4	Assembly Hall (14,711); Champaign, IL
12/10/2011*; 7:00 pm		Canisius	W 81–62	4–4	Reilly Center (4,115); St. Bonaventure, NY
12/18/2011*; 2:30 pm		Loyola (MD)	W 76–66	5–4	Reilly Center (3,095); St. Bonaventure, NY
12/20/2011*; 7:00 pm		vs. NC State; Fibertech Classic	L 65–67	5–5	Blue Cross Arena (5,802); Rochester, NY
12/23/2011*; 7:00 pm		Saint Francis (PA)	W 82–58	6–4	Reilly Center (3,186); St. Bonaventure, NY
12/30/2011*; 7:00 pm, TWCSN		at Niagara	W 72–70	7–5	Gallagher Center (2,200); Lewiston, NY
01/04/2012; 7:00 pm		George Washington	W 66–56	8–5 (1–0)	Reilly Center (3,010); St. Bonaventure, NY
01/07/2012; 4:00 pm		at Duquesne	L 52–66	8–6 (1–1)	Palumbo Center (3,088); Pittsburgh, PA
01/11/2012; 7:00 pm		Dayton	W 81–73	9–6 (2–1)	Reilly Center (3,317); St. Bonaventure, NY
01/14/2012; 12:00 pm		at Xavier	L 64–77	9–7 (2–2)	Cintas Center (10,250); Cincinnati, OH
01/21/2012; 2:00 pm, CBSSN		Fordham	W 95–51	10–7 (3–2)	Reilly Center (4,119); St. Bonaventure, NY
01/25/2012; 7:00 pm, CBSSN		at Rhode Island	W 72–66 ^{OT}	11–7 (4–2)	Ryan Center (3,225); Kingston, RI
01/28/2012; 7:00 pm		Richmond	W 62–47	12–7 (5–2)	Reilly Center (4,589); St. Bonaventure, NY
02/01/2012; 8:00 pm		at Saint Louis	L 62–86	12–8 (5–3)	Chaifetz Arena (6,346); St. Louis, MO
02/08/2012; 7:30 pm		at Massachusetts	L 67–76	12–9 (5–4)	Mullins Center (4,253); Amherst, MA
02/11/2012; 4:00 pm, CBSSN		Duquesne	W 69–48	13–9 (6–4)	Reilly Center (4,505); St. Bonaventure, NY
02/15/2012; 8:00 pm, CBSSN		Temple	L 70–76	13–10 (6–5)	Reilly Center (4,169); St. Bonaventure, NY
02/18/2012; 4:30 pm		Rhode Island	W 81–61	14–10 (7–5)	Reilly Center (5,480); St. Bonaventure, NY
02/22/2012; 7:00 pm		at Fordham	W 89–63	15–10 (8–5)	Rose Hill Gymnasium (2,306); Bronx, NY
02/25/2012; 7:00 pm		at Charlotte	W 72–56	16–10 (9–5)	Dale F. Halton Arena (6,141); Charlotte, NC
02/29/2012; 7:00 pm		Saint Joseph's	W 98–93 ^{2OT}	17–10 (10–5)	Reilly Center (3,539); St. Bonaventure, NY
03/03/2012; 2:00 pm		at La Salle	L 61–71	17–11 (10–6)	Tom Gola Arena (2,616); Philadelphia, PA
2012 Atlantic 10 men's basketball tournament
03/09/2012; 2:30 pm, CBSSN		vs. Saint Joseph's; Quarterfinals	W 71–68	18–11	Boardwalk Hall (7,022); Atlantic City, NJ
03/10/2012; 1:00 pm, CBSSN		vs. Massachusetts; Semifinals	W 84–80	19–11	Boardwalk Hall (6,784); Atlantic City, NJ
03/11/2012; 1:00 pm, CBS		vs. Xavier; Championship Game	W 67–56	20–11	Boardwalk Hall (6,101); Atlantic City, NJ
2012 NCAA tournament
03/16/2012*; 2:45 pm, CBS	No. (E 14)	vs. No. 10 (E 3) Florida State; Second Round	L 63–66	20–12	Bridgestone Arena (11,751); Nashville, TN
*Non-conference game. ^{#}Rankings from AP Poll. (#) Tournament seedings in parentheses. All times are in Eastern Time.
