= 2012 Atlantic 10 men's basketball tournament =

US college basketball tournament

- Classification: Division I
- Season: 2011–12
- Teams: 12
- Site: Boardwalk Hall; Atlantic City, New Jersey
- Champions: St. Bonaventure (1st title)
- Winning coach: Mark Schmidt (1st title)
- MVP: Andrew Nicholson (St. Bonaventure)
- Attendance: 6,101
- Television: CBSSR, CBSSN, CBS

2011–12 Atlantic 10 men's basketball standings
| | Conf. | | | | Overall |
| Team | W | | L | PCT | W | | L | PCT |
|---|---|---|---|---|---|---|---|---|
| Temple | 13 | – | 3 | .813 | 24 | – | 8 | .750 |
| Saint Louis | 12 | – | 4 | .750 | 26 | – | 8 | .765 |
| Xavier | 10 | – | 6 | .625 | 23 | – | 13 | .639 |
| St. Bonaventure† | 10 | – | 6 | .625 | 20 | – | 12 | .625 |
| UMass | 9 | – | 7 | .563 | 26 | – | 11 | .703 |
| La Salle | 9 | – | 7 | .563 | 21 | – | 13 | .618 |
| Dayton | 9 | – | 7 | .563 | 20 | – | 13 | .606 |
| Saint Joseph's | 9 | – | 7 | .563 | 20 | – | 14 | .588 |
| Duquesne | 7 | – | 9 | .438 | 16 | – | 15 | .516 |
| Richmond | 7 | – | 9 | .438 | 16 | – | 16 | .500 |
| Charlotte | 5 | – | 11 | .313 | 13 | – | 17 | .433 |
| George Washington | 5 | – | 11 | .313 | 10 | – | 21 | .323 |
| Rhode Island | 4 | – | 12 | .250 | 7 | – | 24 | .226 |
| Fordham | 3 | – | 13 | .188 | 10 | – | 19 | .345 |
† 2012 Atlantic 10 Tournament winner As of March 13, 2012; Rankings from AP Poll

The 2012 Atlantic 10 men's basketball tournament was played initially at campus sites for the opening round on March 6, 2012 and subsequently at Boardwalk Hall in Atlantic City, New Jersey from March 9 through March 11, 2012. It was the sixth consecutive year that the tournament was hosted in Boardwalk Hall, matching the longest streak at one site since the tournament was held at the Spectrum in Philadelphia, Pennsylvania from 1997–2002. However, it was the tournament's final year in the run at Boardwalk Hall, as the event moved to Brooklyn's new Barclays Center in 2013. The 2012 tournament was also the last to use campus sites for the opening round, as all tournament games will be played in Brooklyn under the new deal.

The tournament champion received an automatic bid to the 2012 NCAA tournament. Seeding for the tournament is determined by the conference standings at the end of the regular season. The last two teams in the standings do not qualify for the tournament. Opening round games are played at the home of the higher (lower number) seed.

The championship game was nationally televised on CBS.

== Tie-breakers ==
- Xavier earned the 3rd seed over St. Bonaventure with a 1–0 record in head-to-head games.
- Four teams (Dayton, La Salle, Massachusetts, and Saint Joseph's) broke a tie for 5th place with a 9–7 conference record, which was done by comparing the composite head-to-head records of all tied teams. Saint Joseph's earned the 5th seed, as they went 3–1 (.750) in games against the other three schools. Dayton earned the 6th seed with a 2–1 (.667) record, La Salle the 7th seed with a 2–2 (.500) record, and Massachusetts the 8th with a 1–4 (.200) record.
- Duquesne earned the 9th seed over Richmond with a 1–0 record in head-to-head games.
- George Washington and Charlotte split their season series 1–1. However, George Washington earned the 11th seed over Charlotte by virtue of an 0–1 mark against Xavier (Charlotte went 0–2 against Xavier).

== Notes ==
2012 marks the first year when Rhode Island did not qualify for the tournament, since the league adopted the current format in 2006. Fordham did not qualify for the fourth consecutive year.

== Bracket ==
First round Campus Sites; March 6, 2012
8 | UMass | 92
9 | Duquesne | 83
5 | Saint Joseph's | 80
12 | Charlotte | 64
7 | La Salle | 80
10 | Richmond | 72
6 | Dayton | 67
11 | George Washington | 50

Quarterfinals; Boardwalk Hall; March 9, 2012
1 | #21 Temple | 71
8 | UMass | 77
4 | St. Bonaventure | 71
5 | Saint Joseph's | 68
2 | Saint Louis | 78
7 | La Salle | 71
3 | Xavier | 70
6 | Dayton | 69

Semifinals; Boardwalk Hall; March 10, 2012
8 | UMass | 80
4 | St. Bonaventure | 84
2 | Saint Louis | 64
3 | Xavier | 71

Championship Game; Boardwalk Hall; March 11, 2012
4 | St. Bonaventure | 67
3 | Xavier | 56
