= 2011–12 Xavier Musketeers men's basketball team =

American college basketball season

2011–12 Xavier Musketeers men's basketball

NCAA tournament, Sweet Sixteen
- Conference: Atlantic 10 Conference

Ranking
- Coaches: No. 24
- Record: 23–13 (10–6 A-10)
- Head coach: Chris Mack (3rd season)
- Assistant coaches: Rasheen Davis; Kareem Richardson; Travis Steele
- Home arena: Cintas Center

2011–12 Atlantic 10 men's basketball standings
	Conf.				Overall
Team	W		L	PCT	W		L	PCT
Temple	13	–	3	.813	24	–	8	.750
Saint Louis	12	–	4	.750	26	–	8	.765
Xavier	10	–	6	.625	23	–	13	.639
St. Bonaventure†	10	–	6	.625	20	–	12	.625
UMass	9	–	7	.563	26	–	11	.703
La Salle	9	–	7	.563	21	–	13	.618
Dayton	9	–	7	.563	20	–	13	.606
Saint Joseph's	9	–	7	.563	20	–	14	.588
Duquesne	7	–	9	.438	16	–	15	.516
Richmond	7	–	9	.438	16	–	16	.500
Charlotte	5	–	11	.313	13	–	17	.433
George Washington	5	–	11	.313	10	–	21	.323
Rhode Island	4	–	12	.250	7	–	24	.226
Fordham	3	–	13	.188	10	–	19	.345
† 2012 Atlantic 10 Tournament winner As of March 13, 2012; Rankings from AP Poll

The 2011–12 Xavier Musketeers men's basketball team represented Xavier University in the 2011–12 NCAA Divisions I Men's Basketball Season. Xavier was led by head coach Chris Mack in his third season at Xavier. The Musketeers competed in the Atlantic 10 Conference and played their home games at the Cintas Center. Xavier finished the season 23–13,10–6 in A-10 play to finish in tie for third place in conference. The Musketeers lost to St. Bonaventure in the championship of the A-10 tournament. Xavier received a #10 seed in the NCAA tournament. The Musketeers defeated Notre Dame and Lehigh to reach the Sweet Sixteen where they were defeated by Baylor.

== Previous season ==
The Musketeers finished the 2010–11 season 24–8, 15–1 in A-10 play to win the regular season championship. They lost in the quarterfinals of the A-10 tournament to Dayton. The Musketeers received an at-large bid as a #6 seed to the NCAA tournament where they lost in Second Round to Marquette.

== Preseason ==
On October 13, 2011, the Musketeers were picked by other Atlantic 10 coaches to finish first in the league standings and received 18 first place votes. Kenny Freese and Mark Lyons were named to the All-Conference Second Team. Justin Martin and Dez Wells were selected to the 2011–12 preseason Atlantic 10 Conference All-Rookie Team.

Senior Center Kenny Frease was suspended from October 14 through October 23 for not fulfilling all of the responsibilities of a Xavier basketball player. Frease was reinstated on October 23. Senior Tu Holloway sat out the first game of the season because of a secondary violation of NCAA rules. Sources believe Holloway played in two summer leagues. The NCAA allows players to compete in one.

== Roster ==
2011–12 Xavier Musketeers men's basketball team
Players
Coaches

Pos.	#	Name	Height	Weight	Year	Hometown
G	0	Dee Davis	6 ft 0 in (1.83 m)	160 lb (73 kg)	Fr	Bloomington, Indiana
G	2	Landen Amos (S)	6 ft 3 in (1.91 m)	180 lb (82 kg)	So	Chicago, Illinois
G	3	O’Neil Cooper	5 ft 9 in (1.75 m)	185 lb (84 kg)	Sr	New York, New York
F	4	Travis Taylor	6 ft 8 in (2.03 m)	220 lb (100 kg)	Jr	Union, New Jersey
G/F	5	Dez Wells	6 ft 5 in (1.96 m)	215 lb (98 kg)	Fr	Raleigh, North Carolina
G	10	Mark Lyons	6 ft 1 in (1.85 m)	188 lb (85 kg)	Jr	Schenectady, New York
G	12	Brad Redford	6 ft 1 in (1.85 m)	182 lb (83 kg)	RS Jr	Frankenmuth, Michigan
G	15	Greg Dougan	6 ft 4 in (1.93 m)	180 lb (82 kg)	Jr	Greensburg, Indiana
F	20	Justin Martin	6 ft 6 in (1.98 m)	205 lb (93 kg)	Fr	Indianapolis, Indiana
F	21	Jeff Robinson	6 ft 10 in (2.08 m)	225 lb (102 kg)	Jr	Indianapolis, Indiana
G/F	31	Isaiah Philmore (redshirt)	6 ft 8 in (2.03 m)	230 lb (104 kg)	Jr	Bel Air, Maryland
C	32	Kenny Frease	7 ft 0 in (2.13 m)	275 lb (125 kg)	Sr	Massillon, Ohio
F	35	Erik Stenger (redshirt)	6 ft 8 in (2.03 m)	205 lb (93 kg)	Jr	Cincinnati, Ohio
F	44	Griffin McKenzie	6 ft 9 in (2.06 m)	240 lb (109 kg)	So	Cincinnati, Ohio
G	52	Tu Holloway	6 ft 0 in (1.83 m)	190 lb (86 kg)	Sr	Hempstead, New York
F	54	Andre Walker	6 ft 8 in (2.03 m)	225 lb (102 kg)	Sr	Flossmoor, Illinois

Head coach

- Chris Mack (Xavier)

Assistant coach(es)

- Rasheen Davis (St. Thomas Aquinas)
- Kareem Richardson (Evansville)
- Travis Steele (Butler)

Legend

- (C) Team captain
- (S) Suspended
- (I) Ineligible
- (W) Walk-on
- Injured
- Current redshirt

Roster
Last update: 2011-12-11

== Schedule and results ==
Date time, TV	Rank^{#}	Opponent^{#}	Result	Record	Site (attendance) city, state
Exhibition
11/5/2011*; 6:00pm	No. 14	Bellarmine	W 76–73	–	Cintas Center (10,033); Cincinnati, OH
Regular season
11/11/2011*; 7:00pm, FSOH	No. 14	Morgan State	W 74–63	1–0	Cintas Center (10,250); Cincinnati, OH
11/15/2011*; 7:00pm, FSOH	No. 13	IPFW	W 86–63	2–0	Cintas Center (9,873); Cincinnati, OH
11/18/2011*; 7:00 pm, FSOH	No. 13	Miami (OH)	W 66–40	3–0	Cintas Center (10,250); Cincinnati, OH
11/25/2011*; 8:00pm, FSOH	No. 12	Georgia	W 70–56	4–0	Cintas Center (10,250); Cincinnati, OH
11/28/2011*; 7:00pm, ESPN2	No. 11	at No. 20 Vanderbilt	W 82–70 ^{OT}	5–0	Memorial Gymnasium (14,316); Nashville, TN
12/3/2011*; 3:00pm, ESPNU	No. 11	Purdue	W 66–63	6–0	Cintas Center (10,250); Cincinnati, OH
12/7/2011*; 9:00pm, ESPN	No. 8	at Butler	W 73–61	7–0	Hinkle Fieldhouse (7,033); Indianapolis, IN
12/10/2011*; 12:30pm, ESPN2	No. 8	Cincinnati; Skyline Chili Crosstown Shootout	W 76–53	8–0	Cintas Center (10,250); Cincinnati, OH
12/18/2011*; 1:00pm, FSOH	No. 8	Oral Roberts	L 42–64	8–1	Cintas Center (9,678); Cincinnati, OH
12/22/2011*; 11:00pm, ESPNU	No. 14	vs. Long Beach State; Diamond Head Classic	L 58–68	8–2	Stan Sheriff Center (N/A); Honolulu, HI
12/24/2011*; 1:30am, ESPNU	No. 14	at Hawaiʻi; Diamond Head Classic Consolation Game	L 82–84 ^{OT}	8–3	Stan Sheriff Center (6,836); Honolulu, HI
12/25/2011*; 2:00pm, ESPN3	No. 14	vs. Southern Illinois; Diamond Head Classic 7th Place Game	W 87–77	9–3	Stan Sheriff Center (N/A); Honolulu, HI
12/31/2011*; 8:00pm, ESPN2		Gonzaga	L 65–72	9–4	Cintas Center (10,250); Cincinnati, OH
1/4/2012; 6:00pm, FSOH/CBSSR		at La Salle	L 70–80	9–5 (0–1)	Tom Gola Arena (2,076); Philadelphia, PA
1/7/2012; 12:00pm, FSOH		at Fordham	W 67–59	10–5 (1–1)	Rose Hill Gymnasium (3,200); Bronx, NY
1/11/2012; 7:00pm, CBSSN		Duquesne	W 78–50	11–5 (2–1)	Cintas Center (10,168); Cincinnati, OH
1/14/2012; 12:00pm, ESPNU		St. Bonaventure	W 74–67	12–5 (3–1)	Cintas Center (10,250); Cincinnati, OH
1/18/2012; 7:00pm, FSOH/CBSSR		Saint Joseph's	W 68–55	13–5 (4–1)	Cintas Center (9,919); Cincinnati, OH
1/21/2012; 1:00pm, ESPN2		at Dayton	L 72–87	13–6 (4–2)	University of Dayton Arena (13,435); Dayton, OH
1/25/2012; 7:00pm, FSOH		Saint Louis	L 68–73	13–7 (4–3)	Cintas Center (10,153); Cincinnati, OH
1/28/2012; 7:00pm, FSOH		at Charlotte	W 74–70	14–7 (5–3)	Dale F. Halton Arena (7,503); Charlotte, NC
2/1/2012; 7:00pm, FSOH/CBSSR		at George Washington	W 59–58	15–7 (6–3)	Charles E. Smith Athletic Center (2,716); Washington, DC
2/4/2012*; 1:00pm, FSOH		at Memphis	L 68–72	15–8	FedExForum (17,097); Memphis, TN
2/8/2012; 7:00pm, CBSSN		Rhode Island	W 84–66	16–8 (7–3)	Cintas Center (10,250); Cincinnati, OH
2/11/2012; 9:00pm, ESPN2		at Temple	L 72–85	16–9 (7–4)	Liacouras Center (9,370); Philadelphia, PA
2/18/2012; 8:00pm, CBSSN		Dayton	W 86–83 ^{OT}	17–9 (8–4)	Cintas Center (10,250); Cincinnati, OH
2/21/2012; 7:00pm, FSOH/CBSSR		at Massachusetts	L 73–80	17–10 (8–5)	Mullens Center (6,632); Amherst, MA
2/25/2012; 8:00pm, ESPN2		Richmond	W 65–57	18–10 (9–5)	Cintas Center (10,250); Cincinnati, OH
2/28/2012; 9:00pm, CBSSN		at Saint Louis	L 59–70	18–11 (9–6)	Chaifetz Arena (10,441); St. Louis, MO
3/3/2012; 2:00pm, FSOH/CBSSN		Charlotte	W 72–63	19–11 (10–6)	Cintas Center (10,183); Cincinnati, OH
A-10 tournament
3/9/2012; 9:00pm, CBSSN	(3)	vs. (6) Dayton; Quarterfinals	W 70–69	20–11	Boardwalk Hall (5,955); Atlantic City, NJ
3/10/2012; 3:30pm, CBSSN	(3)	vs. (2) Saint Louis; Semifinals	W 71–64	21–11	Boardwalk Hall (6,784); Atlantic City, NJ
3/11/2012; 1:00pm, CBS	(3)	vs. (4) St. Bonaventure; Championship Game	L 56–67	21–12	Boardwalk Hall (6,101); Atlantic City, NJ
NCAA tournament
3/16/2012*; 9:45pm, CBS	(10 S)	vs. (7 S) Notre Dame; Second Round	W 67–63	22–12	Greensboro Coliseum (16,523); Greensboro, NC
3/18/2012*; 7:45pm, truTV	(10 S)	vs. (15 S) Lehigh; Third Round	W 70–58	23–12	Greensboro Coliseum (18,722); Greensboro, NC
3/23/2012*; 7:15pm, CBS	(10 S)	vs. (3 S) No. 9 Baylor; Sweet Sixteen	L 70–75	23–13	Georgia Dome (N/A); Atlanta, GA
*Non-conference game. ^{#}Rankings from AP Poll. (#) Tournament seedings in parentheses. All times are in Eastern Time. (#) during NCAA Tournament is seed with Region.
