= Carl Jones (basketball) =

American basketball player (born 1991)

Personal information
- Born: February 26, 1991 (age 35) Garfield Heights, Ohio, U.S.
- Listed height: 5 ft 11 in (1.80 m)

Career information
- High school: Garfield Heights (Garfield Heights, Ohio)
- College: Saint Joseph's (2009–2013)
- NBA draft: 2013: undrafted
- Playing career: 2013–2020
- Position: Point guard

Career history
- 2013: MZT Skopje
- 2014: KB Peja
- 2015: Pioneros de Los Mochis
- 2015: Frayles de Guasave
- 2016–2017: Barreteros de Zacatecas
- 2017: Ostioneros de Guaymas
- 2017–2018: Mineros de Zacatecas
- 2018–2019: Capitanes de Ciudad de México
- 2019: Plateros de Fresnillo

Carl Jones (born February 26, 1991) is an American former professional basketball player. He played college basketball for the Saint Joseph's Hawks, and then spent time playing in North Macedonia, Kosovo, and Mexico.

== Career ==
In March 2014, he signed with KB Peja. In 2015, he joined Pioneros de Los Mochis of the Mexican CIBACOPA. After seven games, he left them and signed with Frayles de Guasave.
