= 2012–13 Niagara Purple Eagles men's basketball team =

American college basketball season

2012–13 Niagara Purple Eagles men's basketball
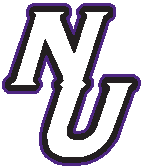

MAAC Regular Season Champions

NIT, First Round
- Conference: Metro Atlantic Athletic Conference
- Record: 19–14 (13–5 MAAC)
- Head coach: Joe Mihalich (14th season)
- Assistant coaches: Kyle Neptune; Mike Farrelly; Shane Nichols
- Home arena: Gallagher Center

2012–13 MAAC men's basketball standings
	Conf.				Overall
Team	W		L	PCT	W		L	PCT
Niagara	13	–	5	.722	19	–	14	.576
Loyola (MD)	12	–	6	.667	23	–	12	.657
Rider	12	–	6	.667	19	–	15	.559
Canisius	11	–	7	.611	20	–	14	.588
Iona †	11	–	7	.611	20	–	14	.588
Fairfield	9	–	9	.500	19	–	16	.543
Manhattan	9	–	9	.500	14	–	18	.438
Marist	6	–	12	.333	10	–	21	.323
Siena	4	–	14	.222	8	–	24	.250
Saint Peter's	3	–	15	.167	9	–	21	.300
† 2013 MAAC tournament winner Rankings from AP Poll

The 2012–13 Niagara Purple Eagles men's basketball team represented Niagara University during the 2012–13 NCAA Division I men's basketball season. The Purple Eagles, led by 14th-year head coach Joe Mihalich, played their home games at the Gallagher Center and were members of the Metro Atlantic Athletic Conference. They finished the season 19–14, 13–5 in MAAC play to win the regular season conference championship. They advanced to the semifinals of the MAAC tournament, where they lost to Iona. As a regular season conference champion who failed to win their conference tournament, they received an automatic bid to the 2013 NIT, where they lost in the first round to Maryland.

== Roster ==
Number	Name	Position	Height	Weight	Year	Hometown
0	T. J. Cline	Forward	6–8	220	Freshman	Plano, Texas
1	Malcolm Lemmons	Guard	6–3	195	Junior	Washington, D.C.
2	Devon White	Center	6–8	240	Senior	Philadelphia, Pennsylvania
5	Tahjere McCall	Guard	6–4	160	Freshman	Philadelphia, Pennsylvania
10	Juan'ya Green	Guard	6–3	195	Sophomore	Philadelphia, Pennsylvania
11	Ameen Tanksley	Guard	6–6	200	Sophomore	Philadelphia, Pennsylvania
12	Scooter Gillette	Forward	6–8	210	Senior	Philadelphia, Pennsylvania
14	Antoine Mason	Guard	6–3	210	Sophomore	Queens, New York
22	Skylar Jones	Guard	6–5	195	Junior	Alexandria, Virginia
24	Rayvon Harris	Guard/forward	6–5	215	Sophomore	Raleigh, North Carolina
30	Joe Thomas	Forward	6–7	220	Sophomore	Miami, Florida
32	Marvin Jordan	Guard	5–11	175	Junior	Peoria, Illinois

== Schedule ==
Date time, TV	Opponent	Result	Record	Site (attendance) city, state
Regular season
11/09/2012*; 9:00 pm	at Oregon State; 2K Sports Classic	L 83–102	0–1	Gill Coliseum (3,206); Corvallis, OR
11/13/2012*; 7:00 pm	Saint Francis (PA)	W 86–69	1–1	Gallagher Center (1,714); Lewiston, NY
11/16/2012*; 7:00 pm	Bucknell; 2K Sports Classic	L 71–88	1–2	Gallagher Center (1,814); Lewiston, NY
11/18/2012*; 4:30 pm	New Mexico State; 2K Sports Classic	W 86–83	2–2	Gallagher Center (1,593); Lewiston, NY
11/24/2012*; 4:00 pm	vs. St. Bonaventure; Fibertech Classic	L 75–80	2–3	Blue Cross Arena (4,758); Rochester, NY
11/28/2012; 7:00 pm	at Iona	L 72–83	2–4 (0–1)	Hynes Athletic Center (1,918); New Rochelle, NY
12/02/2012*; 2:00 pm	at Central Michigan	L 64–66	2–5	McGuirk Arena (1,003); Mount Pleasant, MI
12/05/2012; 7:30 pm	at Loyola (MD)	W 62–61	3–5 (1–1)	Reitz Arena (743); Baltimore, MD
12/08/2012*; 7:30 pm	at Buffalo	L 67–77	3–6	Alumni Arena (4,012); Amherst, NY
12/12/2012*; 7:00 pm	Hartford	W 75–59	4–6	Gallagher Center (1,556); Lewiston, NY
12/16/2012*; 2:00 pm	Vermont	W 68–58	5–6	Gallagher Center (1,491); Lewiston, NY
12/21/2012*; 7:00 pm, ESPNU	at No. 22 Notre Dame	L 67–89	5–7	Edmund P. Joyce Center (8,043); Notre Dame, IN
01/03/2013; 7:00 pm	Marist	W 94–72	6–7 (2–1)	Gallagher Center (1,159); Lewiston, NY
01/05/2013; 3:00 pm	Fairfield	W 71–67	7–7 (3–1)	Gallagher Center (1,445); Lewiston, NY
01/08/2013*; 7:00 pm	at Brown	L 74–75 ^{OT}	7–8	Pizzitola Sports Center (748); Providence, RI
01/11/2013; 7:00 pm	at Saint Peter's	W 77–58	8–8 (4–1)	Yanitelli Center (1,103); Jersey City, NJ
01/13/2013; 1:00 pm	at Fairfield	W 67–64	9–8 (5–1)	Webster Bank Arena (3,376); Bridgeport, CT
01/17/2013; 7:00 pm	Siena	W 87–64	10–8 (6–1)	Gallagher Center (1,449); Lewiston, NY
01/19/2013; 3:00 pm	Manhattan	W 64–60	11–8 (7–1)	Gallagher Center (1,557); Lewiston, NY
01/25/2013; 7:00 pm	at Siena	W 78–69	12–8 (8–1)	Times Union Center (6,387); Albany, NY
01/27/2013; 4:00 pm, ESPN3	at Canisius; Battle of the Bridge	W 66–65	13–8 (9–1)	Koessler Athletic Center (2,196); Buffalo, NY
01/31/2013; 7:00 pm, ESPN3	Iona	W 93–90 ^{OT}	14–8 (10–1)	Gallagher Center (1,856); Lewiston, NY
02/02/2013; 3:00 pm	Loyola (MD)	L 87–89 ^{2OT}	14–9 (10–2)	Gallagher Center (1,481); Lewiston, NY
02/07/2013; 7:30 pm	at Rider	L 69–72	14–10 (10–3)	Alumni Gymnasium (1,603); Lawrenceville, NJ
02/10/2013; 2:00 pm	Canisius; Battle of the Bridge	L 70–77	14–11 (10–4)	Gallagher Center (2,400); Lewiston, NY
02/15/2013; 8:00 pm, ESPN3	at Marist	W 57–54	15–11 (11–4)	McCann Field House (1,054); Poughkeepsie, NY
02/17/2013; 2:00 pm	at Manhattan	W 60–56	16–11 (12–4)	Draddy Gymnasium (2,332); Riverdale, NY
02/23/2013*; 3:00 pm, ESPN3	Northwestern State; BracketBusters	W 92–76	17–11	Gallagher Center (1,704); Lewiston, NY
02/28/2013; 7:00 pm	Rider	L 59–68	17–12 (12–5)	Gallagher Center (1,948); Lewiston, NY
03/02/2013; 3:00 pm	Saint Peter's	W 78–61	18–12 (13–5)	Gallagher Center (1,665); Lewiston, NY
2013 MAAC tournament
03/09/2013; 2:30 pm, ESPN3	vs. Siena; Quarterfinals	W 74–62	19–12	MassMutual Center (1,900); Springfield, MA
03/10/2013; 2:00 pm, ESPN3	vs. Iona; Semifinals	L 73–79	19–13	MassMutual Center (2,421); Springfield, MA
2013 NIT
03/19/2013*; 7:00 pm, ESPN2	vs. Maryland; First Round	L 70–86	19–14	Comcast Center (4,053); College Park, MD
*Non-conference game. ^{#}Rankings from AP Poll. (#) Tournament seedings in parentheses. All times are in Eastern Time.
