= 2012–13 Iona Gaels men's basketball team =

American college basketball season

2012–13 Iona Gaels men's basketball
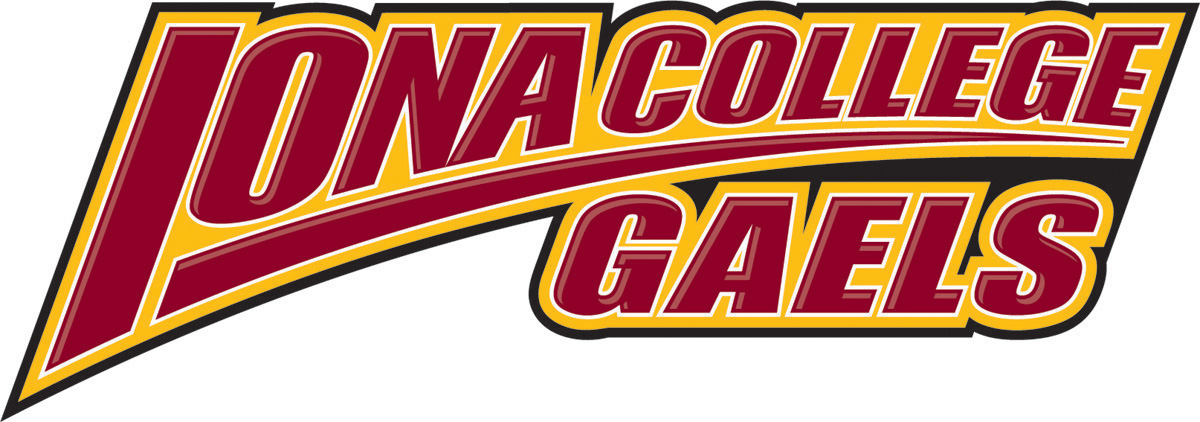

MAAC tournament champions

NCAA Tournament, round of 64
- Conference: Metro Atlantic Athletic Conference
- Record: 20–14 (11–7 MAAC)
- Head coach: Tim Cluess (3rd season)
- Assistant coaches: Jared Grasso; Bill O'Keefe; Zak Boisvert
- Home arena: Hynes Athletic Center

2012–13 MAAC men's basketball standings
	Conf.				Overall
Team	W		L	PCT	W		L	PCT
Niagara	13	–	5	.722	19	–	14	.576
Loyola (MD)	12	–	6	.667	23	–	12	.657
Rider	12	–	6	.667	19	–	15	.559
Canisius	11	–	7	.611	20	–	14	.588
Iona †	11	–	7	.611	20	–	14	.588
Fairfield	9	–	9	.500	19	–	16	.543
Manhattan	9	–	9	.500	14	–	18	.438
Marist	6	–	12	.333	10	–	21	.323
Siena	4	–	14	.222	8	–	24	.250
Saint Peter's	3	–	15	.167	9	–	21	.300
† 2013 MAAC tournament winner Rankings from AP Poll

The 2012–13 Iona Gaels men's basketball team represented Iona College during the 2012–13 NCAA Division I men's basketball season. The Gaels, led by third year head coach Tim Cluess, played their home games at the Hynes Athletic Center and were members of the Metro Atlantic Athletic Conference. They finished the season 20–14, 11–7 in MAAC play to finish in a tie for fourth place. They were champions of the MAAC tournament, defeating Manhattan in the championship game, to earn an automatic bid to the 2013 NCAA tournament where they lost in the second round to Ohio State.

== Roster ==
2012–13 Iona Gaels men's basketball team
Players
Coaches

Pos.	#	Name	Height	Weight	Year	Hometown
F	0	Taaj Ridley	6 ft 7 in (2.01 m)	215 lb (98 kg)	Sr	Bronx, New York
F	1	DeSean Anderson	6 ft 8 in (2.03 m)	200 lb (91 kg)	Jr	Inglewood, California
G	2	Lamont Jones	6 ft 0 in (1.83 m)	195 lb (88 kg)	Sr	Harlem, New York
G	3	Tavon Sledge	5 ft 9 in (1.75 m)	175 lb (79 kg)	So	Spring Valley, New York
G	5	A. J. English	6 ft 3 in (1.91 m)	175 lb (79 kg)	Fr	Middletown, Delaware
G	10	DaShawn Gomez	6 ft 2 in (1.88 m)	180 lb (82 kg)	Jr	Inglewood, California
F	11	Grant Ellis	6 ft 5 in (1.96 m)	195 lb (88 kg)	Fr	Newark, New Jersey
F	12	Shawn Jackson	6 ft 9 in (2.06 m)	250 lb (113 kg)	Jr	Live Oak, Florida
F	13	David Laury	6 ft 8 in (2.03 m)	240 lb (109 kg)	So	East Orange, New Jersey
G	22	Sean Armand	6 ft 3 in (1.91 m)	190 lb (86 kg)	Jr	Brooklyn, New York
G	23	Tre Bowman	6 ft 5 in (1.96 m)	195 lb (88 kg)	Jr	York, Pennsylvania
F	32	Nyandigisi Moikobu	6 ft 8 in (2.03 m)	215 lb (98 kg)	Sr	Seattle, Washington
G	33	Curtis Dennis	6 ft 5 in (1.96 m)	205 lb (93 kg)	Sr	Bronx, New York

Head coach

- Tim Cluess (Hofstra)

Assistant coach(es)

- Jared Grasso (Quinnipiac)
- Bill O'Keefe (Queens College)
- Zak Boisvert (Fordham)

Legend

- (C) Team captain
- (S) Suspended
- (I) Ineligible
- (W) Walk-on
- Injured
- Current redshirt

Roster
Last update: 2013-03-11

== Schedule ==
Date time, TV	Rank^{#}	Opponent^{#}	Result	Record	Site (attendance) city, state
Regular season
11/09/2012*; 9:00 pm, ESPN3		Denver	W 65–58	1–0	Hynes Athletic Center (2,140); New Rochelle, NY
11/16/2012*; 9:00 pm		vs. Quinnipiac; Paradise Jam first round	L 92–98 ^{OT}	1–1	Sports and Fitness Center (2,673); Saint Thomas, USVI
11/17/2012*; 5:00 pm		vs. Wake Forest; Paradise Jam	W 94–68	2–1	Sports and Fitness Center (1,266); Saint Thomas, USVI
11/19/2012*; 5:00 pm		vs. UIC; Paradise Jam	L 81–86	2–2	Sports and Fitness Center (920); Saint Thomas, USVI
11/28/2012; 7:00 pm		Niagara	W 83–72	3–2 (1–0)	Hynes Athletic Center (1,918); New Rochelle, NY
12/05/2012; 7:00 pm		at Saint Peter's	L 62–64	3–3 (1–1)	Yanitelli Center (1,419); Jersey City, NJ
12/08/2012*; 9:30 pm		vs. Rutgers; MSG Holiday Festival	L 73–81	3–4	Madison Square Garden (10,003); New York City, NY
12/15/2012*; 5:00 pm		at Georgia	W 81–78 ^{OT}	4–4	Stegeman Coliseum (4,680); Athens, GA
12/18/2012*; 7:00 pm		Liberty	W 87–69	5–4	Hynes Athletic Center (1,537); New Rochelle, NY
12/20/2012*; 7:00 pm		at La Salle	L 74–88	5–5	Tom Gola Arena (1,402); Philadelphia, PA
12/23/2012*; 2:00 pm		Norfolk State	W 100–72	6–5	Hynes Athletic Center (1,855); New Rochelle, NY
12/28/2012*; 7:00 pm		at Saint Joseph's	L 91–96	6–6	Hagan Arena (4,200); Philadelphia, PA
12/31/2012*; 1:00 pm		at St. Bonaventure	W 93–74	7–6	Reilly Center (3,472); St. Bonaventure, NY
01/04/2012; 7:00 pm, ESPN3		at Siena	W 66–62	8–6 (2–1)	Times Union Center (5,696); Albany, NY
01/06/2013; 5:00 pm		Manhattan	W 78–70	9–6 (3–1)	Hynes Athletic Center (2,186); New Rochelle, NY
01/10/2013; 7:00 pm		at Marist	W 86–82	10–6 (4–1)	McCann Field House (1,103); Poughkeepsie, NY
01/13/2013; 2:00 pm		Canisius	W 97–87	11–6 (5–1)	Hynes Athletic Center (2,094); New Rochelle, NY
01/18/2013; 9:00 pm, ESPNU		Fairfield	W 84–73	12–6 (6–1)	Hynes Athletic Center (2,435); New Rochelle, NY
01/20/2013; 2:00 pm		at Rider	L 62–67	12–7 (6–2)	Alumni Gymnasium (1,420); Lawrenceville, NJ
01/25/2013; 7:00 pm		Saint Peter's	W 90–71	13–7 (7–2)	Hynes Athletic Center (1,925); New Rochelle, NY
01/27/2013; 12:00 pm		at Loyola (MD)	W 79–71	14–7 (8–2)	Reitz Arena (2,028); Baltimore, MD
01/31/2013; 7:00 pm, ESPN3		at Niagara	L 90–93 ^{OT}	14–8 (8–3)	Gallagher Center (1,856); Lewiston, NY
02/02/2013; 7:00 pm		at Canisius	L 74–77	14–9 (8–4)	Koessler Athletic Center (1,852); Buffalo, NY
02/07/2013; 7:00 pm		Marist	L 104–105 ^{2OT}	14–10 (8–5)	Hynes Athletic Center (2,875); New Rochelle, NY
02/09/2013; 7:00 pm, ESPN3		Rider	W 78–71	15–10 (9–5)	Hynes Athletic Center (2,161); New Rochelle, NY
02/15/2013; 7:00 pm, ESPNU		at Manhattan	L 73–74 ^{2OT}	15–11 (9–6)	Draddy Gymnasium (2,520); Riverdale, NY
02/18/2013; 7:00 pm		at Fairfield	L 64–66	15–12 (9–7)	Webster Bank Arena (3,082); Bridgeport, CT
02/23/2013*; 11:00 am, ESPNU		at Indiana State; BracketBusters	L 64–65	15–13	Hulman Center (4,378); Terre Haute, IN
03/01/2013; 7:00 pm, ESPN2		Loyola (MD)	W 90–86	16–13 (10–7)	Hynes Athletic Center (2,521); New Rochelle, NY
03/03/2013; 2:00 pm		Siena	W 80–61	17–13 (11–7)	Hynes Athletic Center (2,525); New Rochelle, NY
2013 MAAC men's basketball tournament
03/09/2013; 4:30 pm, ESPN3		vs. Canisius; Quarterfinals	W 89–85	18–13	MassMutual Center (1,900); Springfield, MA
03/10/2013; 2:00 pm, ESPN3		vs. Niagara; Semifinals	W 79–73	19–13	MassMutual Center (2,421); Springfield, MA
03/11/2013; 9:00 pm, ESPN2		vs. Manhattan; Championship Game	W 60–57	20–13	MassMutual Center (1,493); Springfield, MA
2013 NCAA tournament
03/22/2013*; 7:15 pm, CBS	No. (15 W)	vs. No. 7 (2 W) Ohio State; Second Round	L 70–95	20–14	UD Arena (12,495); Dayton, OH
*Non-conference game. ^{#}Rankings from AP Poll. (#) Tournament seedings in parentheses. All times are in Eastern Time. (#) during NCAA Tournament is Seed with Region W=West.
