= 2012–13 Loyola Greyhounds men's basketball team =

American college basketball season

2012–13 Loyola Greyhounds men's basketball

CIT, Quarterfinals
- Conference: Metro Atlantic Athletic Conference
- Record: 23–12 (12–6 MAAC)
- Head coach: Jimmy Patsos (9th season)
- Assistant coaches: G.G. Smith; Greg Manning; Luke D'Alessio
- Home arena: Reitz Arena

2012–13 MAAC men's basketball standings
	Conf.				Overall
Team	W		L	PCT	W		L	PCT
Niagara	13	–	5	.722	19	–	14	.576
Loyola (MD)	12	–	6	.667	23	–	12	.657
Rider	12	–	6	.667	19	–	15	.559
Canisius	11	–	7	.611	20	–	14	.588
Iona †	11	–	7	.611	20	–	14	.588
Fairfield	9	–	9	.500	19	–	16	.543
Manhattan	9	–	9	.500	14	–	18	.438
Marist	6	–	12	.333	10	–	21	.323
Siena	4	–	14	.222	8	–	24	.250
Saint Peter's	3	–	15	.167	9	–	21	.300
† 2013 MAAC tournament winner Rankings from AP Poll

The 2012–13 Loyola Greyhounds men's basketball team represented Loyola University Maryland during the 2012–13 NCAA Division I men's basketball season. The Greyhounds, led by ninth year head coach Jimmy Patsos, played their home games at Reitz Arena and were members of the Metro Atlantic Athletic Conference. They finished the season 23–12, 12–6 in MAAC play to finish in a tie for second place. They lost in the quarterfinals of the MAAC tournament to Manhattan. They were invited to the 2013 CIT where they defeated Boston University and Kent State to advance to the quarterfinals where they lost ton East Carolina.

This was their last year as members of the MAAC as they joined the Patriot League in July 2013.

== Roster ==
Number	Name	Position	Height	Weight	Year	Hometown
1	Anthony Winbush	Forward	6–7	194	Senior	Alexandria, Virginia
3	Dylon Cormier	Guard	6–2	172	Junior	Baltimore, Maryland
12	R.J. Williams	Guard	5–8	155	Sophomore	Baltimore, Maryland
15	Jordan Letham	Forward	6–8	249	Junior	Baltimore, Maryland
23	Tyler Hubbard	Guard	6–1	165	Sophomore	Mitchellville, Maryland
24	Erik Etherly	Forward	6–7	225	Senior	Annadale, Virginia
25	Robert Olson	Guard	6–4	189	Senior	Silver Spring, Maryland
30	Julius Brooks	Forward	6–9	224	Senior	Greensboro, North Carolina
33	Luke Wandrusch	Guard	6–1	186	Senior	Rockville Center, New York
34	Chido Onyiuke	Forward	6–6	198	Junior	Mount Arlington, New Jersey

== Schedule ==
Date time, TV	Opponent	Result	Record	High points	High rebounds	High assists	Site (attendance) city, state
Exhibition
11/05/2012*; 7:30 pm	Seton Hill	L 67–72	—	–	–	–	Reitz Arena (—); Baltimore, MD
Regular season
11/09/2012*; 7:30 pm	Binghamton	W 71–45	1–0	21 – Cormier	7 – Brooks	3 – Cormier, Olson	Reitz Arena (2,100); Baltimore, MD
11/11/2012*; 8:00 pm, Pac-12 Network	at Washington; Basketball Hall of Fame Tip-Off	L 63–85	1–1	19 – Cormier	8 – Etherly	2 – Olson	Hec Edmundson Pavilion (7,381); Seattle, WA
11/14/2012*; 9:00 pm	UMBC	W 86–70	2–1	22 – Etherly	9 – Rassman	3 – Cormier, Olson, Etherly	Reitz Arena (916); Baltimore, MD
11/17/2012*; 12:00 pm	vs. Norfolk State; Basketball Hall of Fame Tip-Off	W 65–49	3–1	19 – Cormier	9 – Etherly	3 – Olson	Mohegan Sun Arena (N/A); Uncasville, CT
11/18/2012*; 2:00 pm	vs. Albany; Basketball Hall of Fame Tip-Off	W 67–64	4–1	23 – Etherly	7 – Etherly, Winbush	5 – Winbush	Mohegan Sun Arena (N/A); Uncasville, CT
11/23/2012*; 7:00 pm	at Rhode Island; Basketball Hall of Fame Tip-Off	W 58–54 ^{OT}	5–1	20 – Olson	10 – Etherly	4 – Winbush	Ryan Center (3,614); Kingston, RI
11/26/2012*; 7:30 pm	Towson	W 65–53	6–1	19 – Cormier	8 – Cormier	4 – Cormier	Reitz Arena (1,376); Baltimore, MD
11/28/2012*; 7:30 pm	at Coppin State	W 67–51	7–1	27 – Cormier	12 – Winbush	4 – Cormier	Physical Education Complex (2,011); Baltimore, MD
12/01/2012*; 7:05 pm	at Florida Gulf Coast	L 50–65	7–2	17 – Latham	9 – Cormier	3 – Winbush	Alico Arena (2,141); Fort Myers, FL
12/05/2012; 7:30 pm	Niagara	L 61–62	7–3 (0–1)	17 – Cormier	6 – Winbush	2 – Latham, Cormier	Reitz Arena (743); Baltimore, MD
12/08/2012; 12:00 pm	vs. Saint Peter's	W 61–55	8–3 (1–1)	16 – Winbush	8 – Winbush, Brooks	5 – Olson	Izod Center (N/A); East Rutherford, NJ
12/15/2012*; 7:30 pm	Mount St. Mary's	W 79–57	9–3	22 – Olson	11 – Winbush	5 – Jones	Reitz Arena (1,636); Baltimore, MD
12/28/2012*; 7:30 pm	Bucknell	L 46–66	9–4	13 – Cormier	9 – Winbush	2 – Etherly, Olson, Cormier	Reitz Arena (2,100); Baltimore, MD
12/30/2012; 8:00 pm, CSS	at Memphis	L 64–78	9–5	25 – Cormier	9 – Etherly	2 – Winbush, Laster	FedExForum (16,455); Memphis, TN
01/04/2013*; 7:30 pm	at Rider	W 71–65	10–5 (2–1)	21 – Etherly, Cormier	8 – Etherly	6 – Cormier	Reitz Arena (702); Baltimore, MD
01/06/2013; 12:00 pm	Saint Peter's	W 74–58	11–5 (3–1)	24 – Etherly	8 – Winbush	4 – Winbush	Reitz Arena (532); Baltimore, MD
01/11/2013; 7:00 pm, ESPNU	Fairfield	W 63–58 ^{OT}	12–5 (4–1)	20 – Etherly	9 – Winbush	5 – Winbush	Reitz Arena (2,100); Baltimore, MD
01/13/2013; 2:00 pm	Rider	L 57–64	12–6 (4–2)	25 – Olson	8 – Brooks	3 – Winbush	Alumni Gymnasium (1,513); Lawrenceville, NJ
01/17/2013; 7:30 pm	Marist	W 72–58	13–6 (5–2)	19 – Cormier	5 – Brooks	6 – Cormier	Reitz Arena (1,312); Baltimore, MD
01/21/2013; 7:00 pm	at Fairfield	W 65–60	14–6 (6–2)	21 – Cormier	9 – Etherly	3 – Williams	Webster Bank Arena (1,990); Bridgeport, CT
01/25/2013; 7:00 pm, ESPNU	at Manhattan	W 51–41	15–6 (7–2)	12 – Etherly	8 – Winbush	2 – Olson, Williams	Draddy Gymnasium (2,065); Riverdale, NY
01/27/2013; 12:00 pm	Iona	L 71–79	15–7 (7–3)	18 – Cormier	10 – Winbush	7 – Williams	Reitz Arena (2,028); Baltimore, MD
01/31/2013; 7:00 pm	at Canisius	L 79–91	15–8 (7–4)	27 – Olson	6 – Olson	5 – Olson	Koessler Athletic Center (1,303); Buffalo, NY
02/02/2013; 3:00 pm	at Niagara	W 89–87 ^{2OT}	16–8 (8–4)	23 – Olson	13 – Winbush	5 – Williams	Gallagher Center (1,481); Lewiston, NY
02/08/2013; 9:00 pm, ESPNU	Siena	W 63–51	17–8 (9–4)	25 – Etherly	10 – Olson	4 – Cormier, Olson	Reitz Arena (2,100); Baltimore, MD
02/10/2013; 2:00 pm	at Marist	L 64–69	17–9 (9–5)	22 – Etherly	7 – Winbush, Etherly, Williams	2 – Winbush, Olson, Williams	McCann Field House (1,564); Poughkeepsie, NY
02/14/2013; 7:30 pm	Canisius	W 68–64	18–9 (10–5)	18 – Olson	6 – Brooks	5 – Williams	Reitz Arena (824); Baltimore, MD
02/16/2013; 7:00 pm	at Siena	W 80–57	19–9 (11–5)	24 – Cormier	6 – Etherly	5 – Winbush	Times Union Center (6,477); Albany, NY
02/23/2013*; 8:00 pm	at Tennessee State; BracketBusters	W 69–67	20–9	26 – Etherly	8 – Etherly	5 – Williams	Gentry Complex (1,231); Nashville, TN
03/01/2013; 7:00 pm, ESPN2	at Iona	L 86–90	20–10 (11–6)	23 – Etherly, Olson	10 – Etherly	7 – Williams	Hynes Athletic Center (2,521); New Rochelle, NY
03/03/2013; 12:00 pm	Manhattan	W 63–61	21–10 (12–6)	30 – Etherly	7 – Cormier	4 – Olson	Reitz Arena (1,324); Baltimore, MD
2013 MAAC tournament
03/09/2013; 10:25 pm, ESPN3	vs. Manhattan; Quarterfinals	L 52–55	21–11	14 – Cormier	7 – Cormier	3 – Cormier, Williams	MassMutual Center (N/A); Springfield, MA
2013 CIT
03/19/2013*; 7:30 pm	Boston University; First Round	W 70–63	22–11	16 – Olson, Cormier	9 – Etherly	7 – Williams	Reitz Arena (984); Baltimore, MD
03/24/2013*; 3:00 pm	Kent State; Second Round	W 73–59	23–11	27 – Etherly	11 – Etherly	4 – Etherly	Reitz Arena (747); Baltimore, MD
03/26/2013*; 7:00 pm	at East Carolina; Quarterfinals	L 58–70	23–12	12 – Cormier	8 – Cormier	6 – Williams	Williams Arena (4,512); Greenville, NC
*Non-conference game. ^{#}Rankings from AP Poll. (#) Tournament seedings in parentheses. All times are in Eastern Time.
