= 2012–13 La Salle Explorers men's basketball team =

American college basketball season

2012–13 La Salle Explorers men's basketball

Philadelphia Big 5 co-champions

NCAA Tournament, Sweet Sixteen
- Conference: Atlantic 10 Conference

Ranking
- Coaches: No. 24
- Record: 24–10 (11–5 A-10)
- Head coach: John Giannini (9th season)
- Assistant coaches: Horace Owens; Harris Adler; Will Bailey
- Home arena: Tom Gola Arena

2012–13 Atlantic 10 men's basketball standings
	Conf.				Overall
Team	W		L	PCT	W		L	PCT
No. 16 Saint Louis †	13	–	3	.813	28	–	7	.800
No. 25 VCU	12	–	4	.750	27	–	9	.750
Butler	11	–	5	.688	27	–	9	.750
La Salle	11	–	5	.688	24	–	10	.706
Temple	11	–	5	.688	24	–	10	.706
UMass	9	–	7	.563	21	–	12	.636
Xavier	9	–	7	.563	17	–	14	.548
Charlotte	8	–	8	.500	21	–	12	.636
Saint Joseph's	8	–	8	.500	18	–	14	.563
Richmond	8	–	8	.500	19	–	15	.559
Dayton	7	–	9	.438	17	–	14	.548
St. Bonaventure	7	–	9	.438	14	–	15	.483
George Washington	7	–	9	.438	13	–	17	.433
Rhode Island	3	–	13	.188	8	–	21	.276
Fordham	3	–	13	.188	7	–	24	.226
Duquesne	1	–	15	.063	8	–	22	.267
† 2013 Atlantic 10 Tournament winner As of March 28, 2013; Rankings from AP Poll

The 2012–13 La Salle Explorers basketball team represented La Salle University during the 2012–13 NCAA Division I men's basketball season. The Explorers, led by ninth year head coach John Giannini, played their home games at Tom Gola Arena and were members of the Atlantic 10 Conference. They finished the season 24–10, 11–5 in A-10 play to finish in a three way tie for third place. They lost in the quarterfinals of the Atlantic 10 tournament to Butler. They received an at-large bid to the 2013 NCAA tournament, their first NCAA bid in 21 years. They defeated Boise State in the First Four, Kansas State in the Round of 64, and Ole Miss in the Round of 32 to advance to the Sweet Sixteen where they lost to Wichita State. In the final moments vs. Ole Miss junior guard Tyrone Garland hit a game winning layup known as the "Southwest Philly Floater".

== Roster ==
2012–13 La Salle Explorers men's basketball team
Players
Coaches

Pos.	#	Name	Height	Weight	Year	Hometown
C	0	Stephen Zack	6 ft 11 in (2.11 m)	245 lb (111 kg)	So	New Cumberland, PA
G	1	D.J. Peterson	6 ft 5 in (1.96 m)	190 lb (86 kg)	So	Burnsville, MN
G	3	Tyreek Duren	6 ft 0 in (1.83 m)	185 lb (84 kg)	Jr	Philadelphia, PA
G	5	Taylor Dunn	6 ft 2 in (1.88 m)	205 lb (93 kg)	RS Jr	State College, PA
G	10	Sam Mills	6 ft 2 in (1.88 m)	200 lb (91 kg)	Jr	Sunrise, FL
C	13	Garvin Hunt	6 ft 10 in (2.08 m)	235 lb (107 kg)	RS Sr	Freeport, BAH
G	21	Tyrone Garland	6 ft 1 in (1.85 m)	180 lb (82 kg)	Jr	Philadelphia, PA
F	25	Jerrell Wright	6 ft 8 in (2.03 m)	240 lb (109 kg)	So	Philadelphia, PA
C	30	Jermaine Davis	6 ft 9 in (2.06 m)	280 lb (127 kg)	Fr	Garfield Heights, OH
G/F	35	Rohan Brown	6 ft 6 in (1.98 m)	220 lb (100 kg)	RS Fr	Hartford, CT
G	55	Ramon Galloway	6 ft 3 in (1.91 m)	180 lb (82 kg)	Sr	Philadelphia, PA

Head coach

- John Giannini (North Central (IL))

Assistant coach(es)

- Horace Owens (Rhode Island)
- Harris Adler (USciences)
- Will Bailey (UAB)

Legend

- (C) Team captain
- (S) Suspended
- (I) Ineligible
- (W) Walk-on
- Injured
- Current redshirt

== Schedule ==
Date time, TV	Rank^{#}	Opponent^{#}	Result	Record	High points	High rebounds	High assists	Site (attendance) city, state
Exhibition
Nov. 02*; 7:00 pm		Carleton	W 61–58		28 – Galloway	6 – Zack	6 – Mills	Tom Gola Arena (N/A); Philadelphia, PA
Regular season
Nov. 10*; 3:00 pm		Delaware	W 73–66	1–0	19 – Zack	10 – Wright	4 – Galloway	Tom Gola Arena (3,400); Philadelphia, PA
Nov. 18*; 2:00 pm		Central Connecticut	L 74–81	1–1	18 – Wright	6 – 2 tied	4 – 2 tied	Tom Gola Arena (1,512); Philadelphia, PA
Nov. 20*; 7:00 pm		at Hartford	W 64–51	2–1	15 – Duren	12 – Brown	2 – 3 tied	Chase Arena (819); West Hartford, CT
Nov. 25*; 1:00 pm, CBSSN		Villanova	W 77–74 ^{OT}	3–1	26 – Galloway	14 – Zack	5 – Duren	Tom Gola Arena (3,091); Philadelphia, PA
Nov. 29*; 7:00 pm		at Rider	W 63–52	4–1	20 – Duren	8 – Wright	6 – Duren	Alumni Gymnasium (1,529); Lawrenceville, NJ
Dec. 05*; 7:00 pm, NBCSN		vs. Penn State	W 82–57	5–1	29 – Duren	8 – Zack	4 – 2 tied	The Palestra (4,382); Philadelphia, PA
Dec. 08*; 7:00 pm		at Northeastern	W 66–64	6–1	24 – Galloway	6 – Zack	4 – Mills	Matthews Arena (1,839); Boston, MA
Dec. 15*; 7:00 pm		at Bucknell	L 66–74	6–2	21 – Galloway	7 – Galloway	1 – 3 tied	Sojka Pavilion (3,402); Lewisburg, PA
Dec. 20*; 7:00 pm		Iona	W 88–74	7–2	26 – Garland	10 – Zack	10 – Galloway	Tom Gola Arena (1,402); Philadelphia, PA
Dec. 22*; 2:00 pm		Sacred Heart	W 100–71	8–2	22 – Galloway	8 – Zack	7 – Galloway	Tom Gola Arena (1,211); Philadelphia, PA
Dec. 29*; 7:00 pm		at Siena	W 80–52	9–2	22 – Galloway	7 – Garland	4 – 4 tied	Times Union Center (5,907); Loudonville, NY
Jan. 02*; 9:00 pm, ACCN/ESPN3		at Miami (FL)	L 59–76	9–3	20 – Garland	8 – 2 tied	4 – Galloway	BankUnited Center (3,259); Coral Gables, FL
Jan. 05*; 2:00 pm		Penn	W 74–57	10–3	17 – Galloway, Duren	11 – Wright	6 – Garland	Tom Gola Arena (2,422); Philadelphia, PA
Jan. 09; 7:30 pm		at Charlotte	L 65–74	10–4 (0–1)	23 – Galloway	9 – 2 tied	5 – Duren	Dale F. Halton Arena (5,754); Charlotte, NC
Jan. 12; 2:00 pm		Richmond	W 71–59	11–4 (1–1)	17 – Garland	7 – Duren	7 – Duren	Tom Gola Arena (2,282); Philadelphia, PA
Jan. 16; 7:00 pm		Dayton	W 72–70	12–4 (2–1)	18 – Galloway	5 – Wright	5 – Galloway	Tom Gola Arena (2,012); Philadelphia, PA
Jan. 19; 2:00 pm, CBSSN		at Xavier	L 63–70	12–5 (2–2)	16 – Garland	8 – Wright	2 – 3 tied	Cintas Center (10,039); Cincinnati, OH
Jan. 23; 7:00 pm		No. 9 Butler	W 54–53	13–5 (3–2)	16 – Duren	5 – 2 tied	6 – Duren	Tom Gola Arena (3,400); Philadelphia, PA
Jan. 26; 8:00 pm		at No. 19 VCU	W 69–61	14–5 (4–2)	31 – Galloway	11 – Zack	3 – 3 tied	Siegel Center (7,693); Richmond, VA
Jan. 30; 7:00 pm		Massachusetts	L 60–61	14–6 (4–3)	16 – Galloway, Wright	9 – Zack	6 – Galloway	Tom Gola Arena (2,723); Philadelphia, PA
Feb. 02; 2:00 pm		George Washington	W 80–71	15–6 (5–3)	15 – Galloway, Peterson	8 – Wright	5 – Duren	Smith Center (3,347); Washington, D.C.
Feb. 09; 2:00 pm		Fordham	W 89–53	16–6 (6–3)	21 – Mills	7 – 2 tied	8 – Duren	Tom Gola Arena (2,246); Philadelphia, PA
Feb. 13; 7:00 pm		at St. Bonaventure	W 69–66 ^{OT}	17–6 (7–3)	23 – Galloway	10 – Zack	5 – Galloway	Reilly Center (3,521); St. Bonaventure, NY
Feb. 16; 1:00 pm, NBCSN		vs. Saint Joseph's	W 76–64	18–6 (8–3)	29 – Duren	7 – Wright	12 – Galloway	The Palestra (8,722); Philadelphia, PA
Feb. 21; 7:00 pm, CBSSN		at Temple	L 74–82	18–7 (8–4)	18 – Galloway	10 – Galloway	4 – Galloway	Liacouras Center (10,206); Philadelphia, PA
Feb. 24; 2:00 pm		at Rhode Island	W 72–65	19–7 (9–4)	21 – Duren	15 – Wright	6 – Garland	Ryan Center (5,180); Kingston, RI
Mar. 02; 2:00 pm		Duquesne	W 97–64	20–7 (10–4)	23 – Galloway	8 – Wright	6 – 2 tied	Tom Gola Arena (3,015); Philadelphia, PA
Mar. 06; 7:00 pm		at George Washington	W 84–70	21–7 (11–4)	29 – Galloway	7 – Wright	7 – Duren	Tom Gola Arena (1,833); Philadelphia, PA
Mar. 09; 1:30 pm, NBCSN		at No. 16 Saint Louis	L 54–78	21–8 (11–5)	15 – Garland	9 – Wright	3 – Mills	Chaifetz Arena (10,272); Saint Louis, MO
2013 Atlantic 10 tournament
Mar. 15; 2:40 pm	(4)	vs. (5) Butler; Quarterfinals	L 58–69	21–9	17 – Garland	11 – Wright	6 – Galloway	Barclays Center (N/A); Brooklyn, NY
2013 NCAA tournament
Mar. 20*; 9:10 pm, truTV	(13 W)	vs. (13 W) Boise State; First Four	W 80–71	22–9	22 – Garland	6 – Wright	5 – Duren	UD Arena (12,218); Dayton, OH
Mar. 22*; 3:15 pm, truTV	(13 W)	vs. (4 W) No. 12 Kansas State; Second Round	W 63–61	23–9	21 – Wright	8 – Wright	4 – Galloway	Sprint Center (18,301); Kansas City, MO
Mar. 24*; 8:09 pm, truTV	(13 W)	vs. (12 W) Ole Miss; Third Round	W 76–74	24–9	24 – Galloway	4 – 5 tied	4 – Peterson	Sprint Center (18,498); Kansas City, MO
Mar. 28*; 10:34 pm, TBS	(13 W)	vs. (9 W) Wichita State; Sweet Sixteen	L 58–72	24–10	16 – Wright, Garland	8 – Galloway	4 – Duren	Staples Center (18,232); Los Angeles, CA
*Non-conference game. ^{#}Rankings from AP Poll/Coaches' Poll. (#) Tournament seedings in parentheses. All times are in Eastern Time. (#) during NCAA Tournament is seed with Region W=West.
