= 2013 MAAC men's basketball tournament =

- 2013 MAAC Tournament Logo
- Classification: Division I
- Season: 2012–13
- Teams: 10
- Site: MassMutual Center; Springfield, MA
- Champions: Iona (8th title)
- Winning coach: Tim Cluess (1st title)
- MVP: Lamont Jones (Iona)
- Television: ESPN2, ESPN3

2012–13 MAAC men's basketball standings
	Conf.				Overall
Team	W		L	PCT	W		L	PCT
Niagara	13	–	5	.722	19	–	14	.576
Loyola (MD)	12	–	6	.667	23	–	12	.657
Rider	12	–	6	.667	19	–	15	.559
Canisius	11	–	7	.611	20	–	14	.588
Iona †	11	–	7	.611	20	–	14	.588
Fairfield	9	–	9	.500	19	–	16	.543
Manhattan	9	–	9	.500	14	–	18	.438
Marist	6	–	12	.333	10	–	21	.323
Siena	4	–	14	.222	8	–	24	.250
Saint Peter's	3	–	15	.167	9	–	21	.300
† 2013 MAAC tournament winner Rankings from AP Poll

The 2013 Metro Atlantic Athletic Conference men's basketball tournament was held March 8–11 at the MassMutual Center in Springfield, Massachusetts. The tournament was held in Springfield through 2014. Iona defeated Manhattan in the championship game to win the tournament and an automatic bid into the 2013 NCAA tournament.

== Bracket ==
First round Friday, March 8
8	Marist	64
9	Siena	70
7	Fairfield	54
10	Saint Peter's	47

Quarterfinals; Saturday, March 9 ESPN3
1	Niagara	74
9	Siena	62
4	Iona	89
5	Canisius	85
2	Rider	42
7	Fairfield	43
3	Loyola (MD)	52
6	Manhattan	55

Semifinals; Sunday, March 10; ESPN3
1	Niagara	73
4	Iona	79
7	Fairfield	42
6	Manhattan	60

Championship Game; Monday, March 11; ESPN2
4	Iona	60
6	Manhattan	57
