= 2012–13 Fairfield Stags men's basketball team =

American college basketball season

2012–13 Fairfield Stags men's basketball
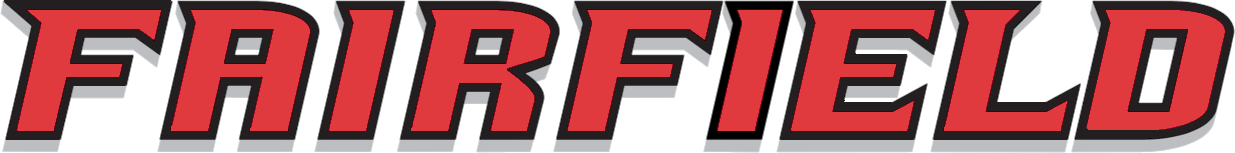

CIT, First Round
- Conference: Metro Atlantic Athletic Conference
- Record: 19–16 (9–9 MAAC)
- Head coach: Sydney Johnson (2nd season)
- Assistant coaches: Tony Newsom; Tyson Wheeler; Martin Bahar
- Home arena: Webster Bank Arena

2012–13 MAAC men's basketball standings
	Conf.				Overall
Team	W		L	PCT	W		L	PCT
Niagara	13	–	5	.722	19	–	14	.576
Loyola (MD)	12	–	6	.667	23	–	12	.657
Rider	12	–	6	.667	19	–	15	.559
Canisius	11	–	7	.611	20	–	14	.588
Iona †	11	–	7	.611	20	–	14	.588
Fairfield	9	–	9	.500	19	–	16	.543
Manhattan	9	–	9	.500	14	–	18	.438
Marist	6	–	12	.333	10	–	21	.323
Siena	4	–	14	.222	8	–	24	.250
Saint Peter's	3	–	15	.167	9	–	21	.300
† 2013 MAAC tournament winner Rankings from AP Poll

The 2012–13 Fairfield Stags men's basketball team represented Fairfield University during the 2012–13 NCAA Division I men's basketball season. The Stags, led by second year head coach Sydney Johnson, played their home games at Webster Bank Arena and were members of the Metro Atlantic Athletic Conference. They finished the season 19–16, 9–9 in a tie for sixth place. They advanced to the semifinals of the MAAC tournament where they lost to Manhattan. They were invited to the 2013 CIT where they lost in the first round to Kent State.

== Roster ==
Number	Name	Position	Height	Weight	Year	Hometown
0	Justin Jenkins	Guard	6–2	175	Freshman	The Bronx, New York
3	Derek Needham	Guard	5–11	180	Senior	Dolton, Illinois
10	Josip Mikulic	Forward	7–0	228	Freshman	Široki Brijeg, Croatia
11	Desmond Wade	Guard	5–8	150	Senior	Linden, New Jersey
14	Marcus Gilbert	Forward	6–6	185	Freshman	Bryn Athyn, Pennsylvania
15	Maurice Barrow	Forward	6–5	210	Junior	Hollis, New York
21	Amadou Sidibe	Forward	6–8	215	Freshman	The Bronx, New York
25	Colin Nickerson	Guard	6–3	150	Senior	Waukegan, Illinois
33	Vincent Van Nes	Forward/Center	7–0	230	Sophomore	Dorchester, England
35	Coleman Johnson	Forward	6–6	215	Freshman	Oak Hill, Virginia
41	Keith Matthews	Forward	6–5	200	Junior	Sebastian, Florida
44	Sean Grennan	Guard	6–3	170	Sophomore	Toms River, New Jersey

== Schedule ==
Date time, TV	Opponent	Result	Record	Site (attendance) city, state
Exhibition
11/02/2012*; 7:00 pm	Bridgeport	W 54–52		Webster Bank Arena (1,393); Bridgeport, CT
Regular season
11/10/2012*; 8:00 pm	vs. Central Connecticut; Connecticut 6 Classic	W 64–63 ^{OT}	1–0	Chase Arena at Reich Family Pavilion (3,186); Hartford, CT
11/12/2012*; 7:00 pm, ESPN3	at Virginia; NIT Season Tip-Off	L 45–54	1–1	John Paul Jones Arena (8,568); Charlottesville, VA
11/13/2012*; 4:30 pm	vs. Penn; NIT Season Tip-Off	W 62–53	2–1	John Paul Jones Arena (8,490); Charlottesville, VA
11/19/2012*; 8:30 pm	at Lehigh; NIT Season Tip-Off	L 67–82	2–2	Stabler Arena (924); Bethlehem, PA
11/20/2012*; 6:00 pm	vs. Fordham; NIT Season Tip-Off	W 74–71	3–2	Stabler Arena (486); Bethlehem, PA
11/23/2012*; 7:00 pm	at Providence	L 47–66	3–3	Dunkin' Donuts Center (6,854); Providence, RI
11/27/2012*; 8:30 pm, WCIU/ESPN3	at DePaul	L 78–85	3–4	Allstate Arena (7,017); Rosemont, IL
12/01/2012*; 8:30 pm	at Austin Peay	W 74–55	4–4	Dunn Center (2,208); Clarksville, TN
12/07/2012; 7:00 pm	Canisius	L 55–67	4–5 (0–1)	Webster Bank Arena (2,684); Bridgeport, CT
12/09/2012; 2:00 pm	at Rider	W 65–52	5–5 (1–1)	Alumni Gymnasium (1,559); Lawrenceville, NJ
12/12/2012*; 7:00 pm	Milwaukee	W 62–46	6–5	Webster Bank Arena (1,572); Bridgeport, CT
12/16/2012*; 4:00 pm	Drexel	W 69–58	7–5	Webster Bank Arena (1,310); Bridgeport, CT
12/22/2012*; 2:00 pm	at Saint Joseph's	W 60–57	8–5	Hagan Arena (4,071); Philadelphia, PA
12/29/2012*; 7:00 pm	at Old Dominion	W 55–54	9–5	Ted Constant Convocation Center (6,032); Norfolk, VA
01/03/2013; 7:00 pm	at Canisius	W 66–45	10–5 (2–1)	Koessler Athletic Center (1,106); Buffalo, NY
01/05/2013; 3:00 pm	at Niagara	L 67–71	10–6 (2–2)	Gallagher Center (1,445); Lewiston, NY
01/11/2013; 7:00 pm, ESPNU	at Loyola (MD)	L 58–63 ^{OT}	10–7 (2–3)	Reitz Arena (2,100); Baltimore, MD
01/13/2013; 1:00 pm	Niagara	L 64–67	10–8 (2–4)	Webster Bank Arena (3,376); Bridgeport, CT
01/18/2013; 9:00 pm, ESPNU	at Iona	L 73–84	10–9 (2–5)	Hynes Athletic Center (2,435); New Rochelle, NY
01/21/2013; 7:00 pm	Loyola (MD)	L 60–65	10–10 (2–6)	Webster Bank Arena (1,990); Bridgeport, CT
01/24/2013; 7:00 pm, ESPN3	Marist	W 71–37	11–10 (3–6)	Webster Bank Arena (1,266); Bridgeport, CT
01/27/2013; 2:00 pm	at Saint Peter's	W 61–54	12–10 (4–6)	Yanitelli Center (1,131); Jersey City, NJ
02/01/2013; 7:00 pm	Rider	W 69–59	13–10 (5–6)	Webster Bank Arena (2,820); Bridgeport, CT
02/04/2013; 7:00 pm	at Siena	W 64–54	14–10 (6–6)	Times Union Center (5,597); Albany, NY
02/07/2013; 7:00 pm	Saint Peter's	W 61–44	15–10 (7–6)	Webster Bank Arena (1,263); Bridgeport, CT
02/12/2013; 7:00 pm	Manhattan	L 40–62	15–11 (7–7)	Webster Bank Arena (1,186); Bridgeport, CT
02/14/2013; 8:30 pm, ESPN3	Siena	W 74–52	16–11 (8–7)	Webster Bank Arena (1,756); Bridgeport, CT
02/18/2013; 7:00 pm	Iona	W 66–64	17–11 (9–7)	Webster Bank Arena (3,082); Bridgeport, CT
02/23/2013*; 1:00 pm	Albany; BracketBusters	L 50–58	17–12	Webster Bank Arena (3,678); Bridgeport, CT
03/01/2013; 9:00 pm, ESPNU	at Manhattan	L 31–34	17–13 (9–8)	Draddy Gymnasium (2,088); Riverdale, NY
03/03/2013; 2:00 pm, ESPN3	at Marist	L 60–73	17–14 (9–9)	McCann Field House (1,680); Poughkeepsie, NY
2013 MAAC men's basketball tournament
03/08/2013; 9:30 pm	vs. Saint Peter's; First Round	W 54–47	18–14	MassMutual Center (2,038); Springfield, MA
03/09/2013; 7:30 pm, ESPN3	vs. Rider; Quarterfinals	W 43–42	19–14	MassMutual Center (N/A); Springfield, MA
03/10/2013; 4:30 pm, ESPN3	vs. Manhattan; Semifinals	L 42–60	19–15	MassMutual Center (2,421); Springfield, MA
2013 CIT
03/20/2013*; 7:00 pm	at Kent State; First Round	L 71–73	19–16	M.A.C. Center (1,855); Kent, OH
*Non-conference game. ^{#}Rankings from AP Poll. (#) Tournament seedings in parentheses. All times are in Eastern Time.
