= 2012–13 Saint Peter's Peacocks men's basketball team =

American college basketball season

2012–13 Saint Peter's Peacocks men's basketball
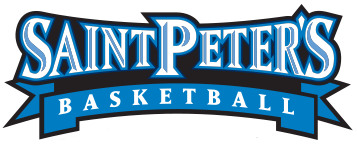
- Conference: Metro Atlantic Athletic Conference
- Record: 9–21 (3–15 MAAC)
- Head coach: John Dunne (7th season)
- Assistant coaches: Bruce Hamburger; Marlon Guild; Dalip Bhatia
- Home arena: Yanitelli Center

2012–13 MAAC men's basketball standings
	Conf.				Overall
Team	W		L	PCT	W		L	PCT
Niagara	13	–	5	.722	19	–	14	.576
Loyola (MD)	12	–	6	.667	23	–	12	.657
Rider	12	–	6	.667	19	–	15	.559
Canisius	11	–	7	.611	20	–	14	.588
Iona †	11	–	7	.611	20	–	14	.588
Fairfield	9	–	9	.500	19	–	16	.543
Manhattan	9	–	9	.500	14	–	18	.438
Marist	6	–	12	.333	10	–	21	.323
Siena	4	–	14	.222	8	–	24	.250
Saint Peter's	3	–	15	.167	9	–	21	.300
† 2013 MAAC tournament winner Rankings from AP Poll

The 2012–13 Saint Peter's Peacocks men's basketball team represented Saint Peter's University during the 2012–13 NCAA Division I men's basketball season. The Peacocks, led by seventh year head coach John Dunne, played their home games at the Yanitelli Center and were members of the Metro Atlantic Athletic Conference. They finished the season 9–21, 3–15 in MAAC play to finish in last place. They lost in the first round of the MAAC tournament to Fairfield.

== Roster ==
Number	Name	Position	Height	Weight	Year	Hometown
0	Patrick Jackson	Forward	6–6	217	Senior	Brooklyn, New York
1	Mohamed Farih	Forward	6–4	190	Sophomore	Kearny, New Jersey
2	Yvon Raymond	Guard	6–3	180	Senior	Maplewood, New Jersey
4	Jamel Fields	Guard	6–2	175	Junior	Albany, New York
10	Elias Desport	Forward	6–7	213	Freshman	Stockholm, Sweden
11	Desi Washington	Guard	6–2	175	Sophomore	Harrisburg, Pennsylvania
12	Chris Prescott	Guard	6–2	190	Senior	Bloomfield, Connecticut
13	Jose Irizarry	Guard	6–0	175	Junior	Harlem, New York
15	Karee Ferguson	Forward	6–7	190	Senior	Willingboro, New Jersey
20	Chazz Patterson	Guard	6–3	170	Freshman	Browns Mills, New Jersey
21	Marvin Dominique	Forward	6–7	215	Junior	Miramar, Florida
22	Chris Burke	Guard	6–4	185	Senior	Willingboro, New Jersey
23	Blaise Ffench	Guard	6–2	190	Senior	Springfield Gardens, New York
24	Markese Tucker	Forward	6–5	240	Sophomore	Trenton, New Jersey
42	Darius Conley	Forward	6–7	235	Senior	Newport News, Virginia

== Schedule ==
Date time, TV	Opponent	Result	Record	Site (attendance) city, state
Regular season
11/09/2012*; 7:30 pm	at Rutgers	W 56–52	1–0	The RAC (3,906); Piscataway, NJ
11/12/2012*; 7:00 pm	Central Connecticut	W 64–61	2–0	Yanitelli Center (1,219); Jersey City, NJ
11/16/2012*; 7:00 pm	at Cornell	W 68–64	3–0	Newman Arena (1,417); Ithaca, NY
11/18/2012*; 2:00 pm	at Binghamton	L 54–62	3–1	Binghamton University Events Center (1,937); Vestal, NY
11/25/2012*; 1:00 pm	at Seton Hall	L 61–76	3–2	Prudential Center (6,207); Newark, NJ
11/28/2012*; 7:00 pm	Fairleigh Dickinson	L 61–66	3–3	Yanitelli Center (1,028); Jersey City, NJ
12/01/2012*; 2:00 pm	Boston University	L 66–74	3–4	Yanitelli Center (875); Jersey City, NJ
12/05/2012; 7:00 pm	Iona	W 64–62	4–4 (1–0)	Yanitelli Center (1,419); Jersey City, NJ
12/08/2012; 12:00 pm	vs. Loyola (MD)	L 55–61	4–5 (1–1)	Izod Center; East Rutherford, NJ
12/19/2012*; 7:00 pm	Long Island	W 80–67	5–5	Yanitelli Center (1,158); Jersey City, NJ
12/22/2012*; 2:00 pm	Loyola (Chicago)	L 49–54	5–6	Yanitelli Center (789); Jersey City, NJ
12/29/2012*; 1:00 pm	at Central Connecticut	W 71–69	6–6	William H. Detrick Gymnasium (1,216); New Britain, CT
01/04/2013; 7:00 pm	Manhattan	L 53–55	6–7 (1–2)	Yanitelli Center (984); Jersey City, NJ
01/06/2013; 12:00 pm	at Loyola (MD)	L 58–74	6–8 (1–3)	Reitz Arena (532); Baltimore, MD
01/11/2013; 7:00 pm	Niagara	L 58–77	6–9 (1–4)	Yanitelli Center (1,103); Jersey City, NJ
01/13/2013; 2:15 pm	at Siena	L 53–66	6–10 (1–5)	Times Union Center (6,299); Albany, NY
01/17/2013; 8:30 pm, ESPN3	Rider	L 54–66	6–11 (1–6)	Yanitelli Center (2,091); Jersey City, NJ
01/19/2013; 7:00 pm, ESPN3	at Marist	L 48–59	6–12 (1–7)	McCann Field House (1,202); Poughkeepsie, NY
01/25/2013; 7:00 pm	at Iona	L 71–90	6–13 (1–8)	Hynes Athletic Center (1,925); New Rochelle, NY
01/27/2013; 2:00 pm	Fairfield	L 54–61	6–14 (1–9)	Yanitelli Center (1,131); Jersey City, NJ
01/31/2013; 7:00 pm	Marist	W 70–68 ^{OT}	7–14 (2–9)	Yanitelli Center (953); Jersey City, NJ
02/03/2013; 3:00 pm	at Manhattan	L 49–57	7–15 (2–10)	Draddy Gymnasium (1,421); Riverdale, NY
02/07/2013; 7:00 pm	at Fairfield	L 44–61	7–16 (2–11)	Webster Bank Arena (1,263); Bridgeport, CT
02/10/2013; 2:00 pm	Siena	W 72–62	8–16 (3–11)	Yanitelli Center (709); Jersey City, NJ
02/14/2013; 7:00 pm	at Rider	L 57–72	8–17 (3–12)	Alumni Gymnasium (1,545); Lawrenceville, NJ
02/16/2013; 2:00 pm	Canisius	L 59–68	8–18 (3–13)	Yanitelli Center (653); Jersey City, NJ
02/23/2013*; 2:00 pm	at Hampton; BracketBusters	W 66–59	9–18	Hampton Convocation Center (1,643); Hampton, VA
02/28/2013; 7:00 pm, ESPN3	at Canisius	L 65–77 ^{OT}	9–19 (3–14)	Koessler Athletic Center (1,483); Buffalo, NY
03/02/2013; 3:00 pm	at Niagara	L 61–78	9–20 (3–15)	Gallagher Center (1,665); Lewiston, NY
2013 MAAC men's basketball tournament
03/08/2013; 9:30 pm	vs. Fairfield; First Round	L 47–54	9–21	MassMutual Center (2,038); Springfield, MA
*Non-conference game. ^{#}Rankings from AP Poll. (#) Tournament seedings in parentheses. All times are in Eastern Time.
