= 2012–13 Manhattan Jaspers basketball team =

American college basketball season

2012–13 Manhattan Jaspers basketball
- Conference: Metro Atlantic Athletic Conference
- Record: 14–18 (9–9 MAAC)
- Head coach: Steve Masiello (2nd season)
- Assistant coaches: Matt Grady; Rasheen Davis; Oliver Antigua
- Home arena: Draddy Gymnasium

2012–13 MAAC men's basketball standings
	Conf.				Overall
Team	W		L	PCT	W		L	PCT
Niagara	13	–	5	.722	19	–	14	.576
Loyola (MD)	12	–	6	.667	23	–	12	.657
Rider	12	–	6	.667	19	–	15	.559
Canisius	11	–	7	.611	20	–	14	.588
Iona †	11	–	7	.611	20	–	14	.588
Fairfield	9	–	9	.500	19	–	16	.543
Manhattan	9	–	9	.500	14	–	18	.438
Marist	6	–	12	.333	10	–	21	.323
Siena	4	–	14	.222	8	–	24	.250
Saint Peter's	3	–	15	.167	9	–	21	.300
† 2013 MAAC tournament winner Rankings from AP Poll

The 2012–13 Manhattan Jaspers basketball team represented Manhattan College during the 2012–13 NCAA Division I men's basketball season. The Jaspers, led by second year head coach Steve Masiello, played their home games at Draddy Gymnasium and were members of the Metro Atlantic Athletic Conference. They finished the season 14–18, 9–9 in MAAC play to finish in a tie for sixth place. They advanced to the championship game of the MAAC tournament before falling to Iona.

== Roster ==
2012–13 Manhattan Jaspers men's basketball team
#	Name	Position	Height	Weight	Year	Hometown
0	Shane Richards	Forward	6–5	185	Freshman	New York City, New York
1	C. J. Jones	Guard	6–0	175	Freshman	Chicago, Illinois
3	Sky Williams	Guard	6–2	185	Freshman	Tuckahoe, New York
5	Rhamel Brown	Forward/Center	6–7	230	Junior	Brooklyn, New York
10	Ryan McCoy	Forward	6–9	185	Sophomore	Skillman, New Jersey
11	Mark Jackson Jr.	Guard	5–11	190	Sophomore	Brooklyn, New York
12	RaShawn Stores	Guard	5–11	190	Sophomore	The Bronx, New York
13	Emmy Andujar	Forward	6–6	205	Sophomore	The Bronx, New York
15	Adam Lacey	Center	6–10	230	Freshman	Chula Vista, California
21	Paul Bayt	Guard	6–4	170	Freshman	Carmel, Indiana
22	Roberto Colonette	Forward	6–7	210	Senior	Queens, New York
24	George Beamon	Guard/Forward	6–4	175	Senior	Roslyn, New York
30	Ashton Pankey	Forward	6–10	225	Sophomore	The Bronx, New York
31	Michael Alvarado	Guard	6–2	180	Junior	The Bronx, New York
32	Mohamed Koita	Guard	6–4	195	Senior	Cergy, France
33	Donovan Kates	Guard	6–6	200	Sophomore	Hopkinsville, Kentucky

== Schedule ==
Date time, TV	Opponent	Result	Record	Site (attendance) city, state
Regular Season
11/11/2012*; 4:00 pm, WHAS	at No. 2 Louisville	L 51–79	0–1	KFC Yum! Center (20,921); Louisville, KY
11/16/2012*; 7:30 pm	at Harvard	L 45–79	0–2	Lavietes Pavilion (1,506); Boston, MA
11/21/2012*; 7:00 pm	Hofstra	W 67–56	1–2	Draddy Gymnasium (1,031); Riverdale, NY
11/24/2012*; 2:00 pm	at Dayton	L 58–66	1–3	UD Arena (11,482); Dayton, OH
11/29/2012*; 7:00 pm	at Fordham; Battle of the Bronx	W 65–58	2–3	Rose Hill Gymnasium (2,680); The Bronx, NY
12/02/2012*; 12:15 pm, MASN	vs. George Washington; BB&T Classic	L 55–67	2–4	Verizon Center (10,256); Washington, D.C.
12/07/2012; 7:00 pm	at Marist	L 58–62	2–5 (0–1)	McCann Field House (1,687); Poughkeepsie, NY
12/09/2012; 2:00 pm	Siena	W 75–55	3–5 (1–1)	Draddy Gymnasium (1,509); Riverdale, NY
12/16/2012*; 4:00 pm	at Long Island	L 48–75	3–6	Athletic, Recreation & Wellness Center (1,142); Brooklyn, NY
12/22/2012*; 5:30 pm	vs. South Carolina; Brooklyn Hoops Holiday Invitational	L 57–63	3–7	Barclays Center (N/A); Brooklyn, NY
12/29/2012*; 4:00 pm	at Columbia	L 58–69	3–8	Levien Gymnasium (1,026); New York City, NY
01/01/2013*; 2:00 pm	Stony Brook	L 44–50	3–9	Draddy Gymnasium (1,634); Riverdale, NY
01/04/2013; 7:00 pm	at Saint Peter's	W 55–53	4–9 (2–1)	Yanitelli Center (984); Jersey City, NJ
01/06/2013; 5:00 pm	at Iona	L 70–78	4–10 (2–2)	Hynes Athletic Center (2,186); New Rochelle, NY
01/10/2013; 7:00 pm, ESPN3	Rider	L 60–69	4–11 (2–3)	Draddy Gymnasium (1,387); Riverdale, NY
01/13/2013; 2:00 pm	Marist	W 65–53	5–11 (3–3)	Draddy Gymnasium (1,617); Riverdale, NY
01/17/2013; 7:00 pm	at Canisius	L 60–64	5–12 (3–4)	Koessler Athletic Center (1,370); Buffalo, NY
01/19/2013; 3:00 pm	at Niagara	L 60–64	5–13 (3–5)	Gallagher Center (1,557); Lewiston, NY
01/25/2013; 7:00 pm, ESPNU	Loyola (MD)	L 41–51	5–14 (3–6)	Draddy Gymnasium (2,065); Riverdale, NY
01/27/2013; 4:00 pm	at Rider	W 62–51	6–14 (4–6)	Alumni Gymnasium (1,590); Lawrenceville, NJ
02/01/2013; 7:00 pm, ESPNU	at Siena	L 63–66	6–15 (4–7)	Times Union Center (6,098); Albany, NY
02/03/2013; 3:00 pm	Saint Peter's	W 57–49	7–15 (5–7)	Draddy Gymnasium (1,421); Riverdale, NY
02/07/2013; 7:00 pm, ESPN3	Canisius	W 67–54	8–15 (6–7)	Draddy Gymnasium (1,304); Riverdale, NY
02/12/2013; 7:00 pm	at Fairfield	W 62–40	9–15 (7–7)	Webster Bank Arena (1,186); Bridgeport, CT
02/15/2013; 7:00 pm, ESPNU	Iona	W 74–73 ^{2OT}	10–15 (8–7)	Draddy Gymnasium (2,520); Riverdale, NY
02/17/2013; 2:00 pm	Niagara	L 56–60	10–16 (8–8)	Draddy Gymnasium (2,332); Riverdale, NY
02/23/2013*; 2:00 pm	at Buffalo; BracketBusters	W 65–64	11–16	Alumni Arena (3,172); Amherst, NY
03/01/2013; 9:00 pm, ESPNU	Fairfield	W 34–31	12–16 (9–8)	Draddy Gymnasium (2,088); Riverdale, NY
03/03/2013; 12:00 pm	at Loyola (MD)	L 61–63	12–17 (9–9)	Reitz Arena (1,324); Baltimore, MD
MAAC tournament
03/09/2013; 10:25 pm, ESPN3	vs. Loyola (MD); Quarterfinals	W 55–52	13–17	MassMutual Center (N/A); Springfield, MA
03/10/2013; 4:30 pm, ESPN3	vs. Fairfield; Semifinals	W 60–42	14–17	MassMutual Center (2,421); Springfield, MA
03/11/2013; 9:00 pm, ESPN2	vs. Iona; Championship Game	L 57–60	14–18	MassMutual Center (1,493); Springfield, MA
*Non-conference game. ^{#}Rankings from AP Poll. (#) Tournament seedings in parentheses. All times are in Eastern Time.
