= 2013 NCAA Division I men's basketball tournament =

Edition of USA college basketball tournament

- Season: 2012–13
- Teams: 68
- Finals site: Georgia Dome, Atlanta, Georgia
- Champions: Louisville Cardinals* (Note: Louisville were forced to vacate wins and records from the 2011–12, 2012–13, 2013–14, and 2014–15 seasons, including their 2013 championship title, as a penalty for the 2015 sex scandal involving the university.) (vacated) (3rd title, 3rd title game, 10th Final Four)
- Runner-up: Michigan Wolverines (6th title game, 7th Final Four)
- Semifinalists: Syracuse Orange (5th Final Four); Wichita State Shockers (2nd Final Four)
- Winning coach: Rick Pitino* (2nd title)
- MOP: Luke Hancock (Louisville)
- No official champion due to Louisville's vacated wins

The 2013 NCAA Division I men's basketball tournament involved 68 teams playing in a single-elimination tournament that determined the National Collegiate Athletic Association (NCAA) Division I men's basketball national champion for the 2012–13 season. The 75th annual edition of the tournament (dating to 1939) began on March 19, 2013, and concluded with the championship game on April 8, at the Georgia Dome in Atlanta. This was the last men's Final Four to be held at the Georgia Dome as it was demolished in 2017.

The Final Four consisted of Louisville (tenth overall appearance, eighth official appearance), Wichita State (second appearance), Syracuse (first appearance since their 2003 national championship), and Michigan, returning for the first time since the Fab Five's second appearance in 1993 (later vacated). By winning the West Region, Wichita State became the first #9 seed and first Missouri Valley Conference (MVC) team to reach the Final Four since the tournament expanded to 64 teams in 1985. The last #9 seed to reach the Final Four was Penn, and the last MVC team to do so was Indiana State, both in 1979. Louisville defeated Michigan in the championship game by a final score of 82–76, winning their first national title since 1986. On February 20, 2018, the NCAA automatically vacated Louisville's entire tournament run, including its national title, due to a 2015 sex scandal. Although none of the other teams had their runs vacated by NCAA staff, this meant that in effect, the entire tournament was deemed null and void, with no national champion team crowned for the year. This would not happen again until 2020, when the competition, which coincidentally would have seen the Final Four held in Atlanta that year, was cancelled outright due to the COVID-19 pandemic.

The tournament featured several notable upsets. For the first time since 1991, at least one team seeded #9 through #15 won at least once in the tournament. The most notable was Florida Gulf Coast University of the Atlantic Sun Conference, who made their tournament debut in only their second year of Division I eligibility. They upset Georgetown and San Diego State in their first two games, becoming the first #15 seed to advance to the regional semifinals (where they were defeated by Florida). For the first time since 2010, a #14 seed won as Harvard defeated New Mexico in the West Region. The same region saw #13 La Salle, who won in the opening round, defeat #4 Kansas State and #12 Mississippi defeat #5 Wisconsin. In addition to that, the region's top seed, Gonzaga, was defeated in the round of 32 by eventual region winner Wichita State, who defeated La Salle in the Sweet Sixteen.

Two other teams also earned their first ever NCAA Tournament victory: Ivy League champion Harvard and Mid-Eastern Athletic Conference (MEAC) champion North Carolina A&T. Another school, Liberty, won the Big South tournament to become the second 20-loss team to make the field, after Coppin State in 2008.

== Tournament procedure ==
A total of 68 teams entered the 2013 tournament. A total of 32 automatic bids are awarded to each program that won a conference tournament. The remaining 36 bids are issued "at-large", with selections extended by the NCAA Selection Committee. The Selection Committee also seeds the entire field from 1 to 68.

Eight teams—the four lowest-seeded automatic qualifiers and the four lowest-seeded at-large teams—played in the First Four (the successor to what had been popularly known as "play-in games" through the 2010 tournament). The winners of these games advanced to the main tournament bracket.

== Schedule and venues ==
2013 first and second rounds (green)
2013 Regionals (blue) and Final Four (red)

The following are the sites selected to host each round of the 2013 tournament:

First Four

- March 19 and 20
  - University of Dayton Arena, Dayton, Ohio (Host: University of Dayton)

First and Second rounds

- March 21 and 23
  - The Palace of Auburn Hills, Auburn Hills, Michigan (Host: Oakland University)
  - Rupp Arena, Lexington, Kentucky (Host: University of Kentucky)
  - EnergySolutions Arena, Salt Lake City, Utah (Host: University of Utah)
  - HP Pavilion, San Jose, California (Host: West Coast Conference)
- March 22 and 24
  - University of Dayton Arena, Dayton, Ohio (Host: University of Dayton)
  - Frank Erwin Center, Austin, Texas (Host: University of Texas at Austin)
  - Sprint Center, Kansas City, Missouri (Host: Missouri Valley Conference)
  - Wells Fargo Center, Philadelphia, Pennsylvania (Host: Temple University)

Regional semifinals and Finals

- March 28 and 30
  - East Regional
    - Verizon Center, Washington, D.C. (Host: Georgetown University)
  - West Regional
    - Staples Center, Los Angeles, California (Host: Pepperdine University)
- March 29 and 31
  - Midwest Regional
    - Lucas Oil Stadium, Indianapolis, Indiana (Hosts: IUPUI, Horizon League)
  - South Regional
    - Cowboys Stadium, Arlington, Texas (Host: Big 12 Conference)

National semifinals and championship (Final Four and championship)

- April 6 and 8
  - Georgia Dome, Atlanta, Georgia (Host: Georgia Institute of Technology)

Atlanta hosted the Final Four for the sixth time, having previously hosted in 2007. As of 2024, this is the most recent Final Four to be held in Atlanta (The 2020 edition, which was to be held in Atlanta, was canceled due to the COVID-19 pandemic).

== Qualified teams ==
=== Automatic qualifiers ===
The following teams were automatic qualifiers for the 2013 NCAA field by virtue of winning their conference's tournament (except for the Ivy League, whose regular-season champion received the automatic bid).

Conference	School	Appearance	Last bid
America East	Albany	3rd	2007
Atlantic 10	Saint Louis	8th	2012
ACC	Miami	6th	2008
Atlantic Sun	Florida Gulf Coast	1st	Never
Big 12	Kansas	42nd	2012
Big East	Louisville	39th	2012
Big Sky	Montana	10th	2012
Big South	Liberty	3rd	2004
Big Ten	Ohio State	29th	2012
Big West	Pacific	9th	2006
Colonial	James Madison	5th	1994
C-USA	Memphis	25th	2012
Horizon	Valparaiso	8th	2004
Ivy League	Harvard	3rd	2012
MAAC	Iona	10th	2012
MAC	Akron	4th	2011
MEAC	North Carolina A&T	10th	1995
Missouri Valley	Creighton	18th	2012
Mountain West	New Mexico	14th	2012
Northeast	Long Island	6th	2012
Ohio Valley	Belmont	6th	2012
Pac-12	Oregon	11th	2008
Patriot	Bucknell	6th	2011
SEC	Ole Miss	7th	2002
Southern	Davidson	12th	2012
Southland	Northwestern State	3rd	2006
SWAC	Southern	8th	2006
Summit	South Dakota State	2nd	2012
Sun Belt	Western Kentucky	23rd	2012
West Coast	Gonzaga	16th	2012
WAC	New Mexico State	20th	2012

=== Tournament seeds ===
South Regional – Arlington, Texas
Seed	School	Conference	Record	Coach	Berth type	Last bid	Overall rank
#1	Kansas	Big 12	29–5	Bill Self	Automatic	2012	2
#2	Georgetown	Big East	25–6	John Thompson III	At-large	2012	7
#3	Florida	SEC	26–7	Billy Donovan	At-large	2012	10
#4	Michigan	Big Ten	26–7	John Beilein	At-large	2012	13
#5	VCU	Atlantic 10	26–8	Shaka Smart	At-large	2012	20
#6	UCLA	Pac-12	25–9	Ben Howland	At-large	2011	24
#7	San Diego State	Mountain West	22–10	Steve Fisher	At-large	2012	26
#8	North Carolina	ACC	24–10	Roy Williams	At-large	2012	29
#9	Villanova	Big East	20–13	Jay Wright	At-large	2011	38
#10	Oklahoma	Big 12	20–11	Lon Krueger	At-large	2009	40
#11	Minnesota	Big Ten	20–12	Tubby Smith	At-large	2010	41
#12	Akron	MAC	26–6	Keith Dambrot	Automatic	2011	51
#13	South Dakota State	Summit	25–9	Scott Nagy	Automatic	2012	53
#14	Northwestern State	Southland	23–8	Mike McConathy	Automatic	2006	57
#15	Florida Gulf Coast	Atlantic Sun	24–10	Andy Enfield	Automatic	Never	59
#16	Western Kentucky	Sun Belt	20–15	Ray Harper	Automatic	2012	63

West Regional – Los Angeles, California
Seed	School	Conference	Record	Coach	Berth type	Last bid	Overall rank
#1	Gonzaga	West Coast	31–2	Mark Few	Automatic	2012	4
#2	Ohio State	Big Ten	26–7	Thad Matta	Automatic	2012	8
#3	New Mexico	Mountain West	29–5	Steve Alford	Automatic	2012	9
#4	Kansas State	Big 12	27–7	Bruce Weber	At-large	2012	14
#5	Wisconsin	Big Ten	23–11	Bo Ryan	At-large	2012	19
#6	Arizona	Pac-12	25–7	Sean Miller	At-large	2011	21
#7	Notre Dame	Big East	25–9	Mike Brey	At-large	2012	27
#8	Pittsburgh	Big East	24–8	Jamie Dixon	At-large	2011	31
#9	Wichita State	Missouri Valley	26–8	Gregg Marshall	At-large	2012	35
#10	Iowa State	Big 12	22–11	Fred Hoiberg	At-large	2012	39
#11	Belmont	Ohio Valley	26–6	Rick Byrd	Automatic	2012	44
#12	Ole Miss	SEC	26–8	Andy Kennedy	Automatic	2002	47
#13*	Boise State	Mountain West	21–10	Leon Rice	At-large	2008	45
#13*	La Salle	Atlantic 10	21–9	Dr. John Giannini	At-large	1992	49
#14	Harvard	Ivy	19–9	Tommy Amaker	Automatic	2012	58
#15	Iona	MAAC	20–13	Tim Cluess	Automatic	2012	61
#16	Southern	SWAC	23–9	Roman Banks	Automatic	2006	64

East Regional – Washington, D.C.
Seed	School	Conference	Record	Coach	Berth type	Last bid	Overall rank
#1	Indiana	Big Ten	27–6	Tom Crean	At-large	2012	3
#2	Miami	ACC	27–6	Jim Larranaga	Automatic	2008	5
#3	Marquette	Big East	23–8	Buzz Williams	At-large	2012	12
#4	Syracuse	Big East	26–9	Jim Boeheim	At-large	2012	16
#5	UNLV	Mountain West	25–9	Dave Rice	At-large	2012	18
#6	Butler	Atlantic 10	26–8	Brad Stevens	At-large	2011	22
#7	Illinois	Big Ten	22–12	John Groce	At-large	2011	28
#8	NC State	ACC	24–10	Mark Gottfried	At-large	2012	32
#9	Temple	Atlantic 10	23–9	Fran Dunphy	At-large	2012	34
#10	Colorado	Pac-12	21–11	Tad Boyle	At-large	2012	36
#11	Bucknell	Patriot	28–5	Dave Paulsen	Automatic	2011	48
#12	California	Pac-12	20–11	Mike Montgomery	At-large	2012	42
#13	Montana	Big Sky	25–7	Wayne Tinkle	Automatic	2012	54
#14	Davidson	Southern	26–7	Bob McKillop	Automatic	2012	55
#15	Pacific	Big West	22–12	Bob Thomason	Automatic	2006	60
#16*	James Madison	CAA	20–14	Matt Brady	Automatic	1994	66
#16*	Long Island	Northeast	20–13	Jack Perri	Automatic	2012	65

Midwest Regional – Indianapolis, Indiana
Seed	School	Conference	Record	Coach	Berth type	Last bid	Overall rank
#1	Louisville	Big East	29–5	Rick Pitino	Automatic	2012	1
#2	Duke	ACC	27–5	Mike Krzyzewski	At-large	2012	6
#3	Michigan State	Big Ten	25–8	Tom Izzo	At-large	2012	11
#4	Saint Louis	Atlantic 10	27–6	Jim Crews	Automatic	2012	15
#5	Oklahoma State	Big 12	24–8	Travis Ford	At-large	2010	17
#6	Memphis	C-USA	30–4	Josh Pastner	Automatic	2012	23
#7	Creighton	Missouri Valley	27–7	Greg McDermott	Automatic	2012	25
#8	Colorado State	Mountain West	25–8	Larry Eustachy	At-large	2012	30
#9	Missouri	SEC	23–10	Frank Haith	At-large	2012	33
#10	Cincinnati	Big East	22–11	Mick Cronin	At-large	2012	37
#11*	Middle Tennessee	Sun Belt	28–5	Kermit Davis	At-large	1989	50
#11*	Saint Mary's (CA)	West Coast	27–6	Randy Bennett	At-large	2012	46
#12	Oregon	Pac-12	26–8	Dana Altman	Automatic	2008	43
#13	New Mexico State	WAC	24–10	Marvin Menzies	Automatic	2012	52
#14	Valparaiso	Horizon	26–7	Bryce Drew	Automatic	2004	56
#15	Albany	America East	24–10	Will Brown	Automatic	2007	62
#16*	Liberty	Big South	15–20	Dale Layer	Automatic	2004	68
#16*	North Carolina A&T	MEAC	19–16	Cy Alexander	Automatic	1995	67

*See First Four.

== Bracket ==
Unless otherwise noted, all times listed are Eastern Daylight Time (UTC−04)

=== First Four – Dayton, Ohio ===
The First Four games involved eight teams: the four overall lowest-ranked teams, and the four lowest-ranked at-large teams.

March 19 – Midwest Region
11	Middle Tennessee	54
11	Saint Mary's	67

March 19 – Midwest Region
16	Liberty	72
16	North Carolina A&T	73

March 20 – West Region
13	Boise State	71
13	La Salle	80

March 20 – East Region
16	James Madison	68
16	Long Island	55

=== Midwest Regional – Indianapolis, Indiana ===
First round Round of 64; March 21–22
1	~~Louisville~~	79
16	North Carolina A&T	48
Lexington – Thu/Sat
8	Colorado State	84
9	Missouri	72
5	Oklahoma State	55
12	Oregon	68
San Jose – Thu/Sat
4	Saint Louis	64
13	New Mexico State	44
6	Memphis	54
11	Saint Mary's	52
Auburn Hills – Thu/Sat
3	Michigan State	65
14	Valparaiso	54
7	Creighton	67
10	Cincinnati	63
Philadelphia – Fri/Sun
2	Duke	73
15	Albany	61

Second round Round of 32; March 23–24
1	~~Louisville~~	82
8	Colorado State	56
12	Oregon	74
4	Saint Louis	57
6	Memphis	48
3	Michigan State	70
7	Creighton	50
2	Duke	66

Regional semifinals Sweet 16; March 29
1	~~Louisville~~	77
12	Oregon	69
3	Michigan State	61
2	Duke	71

Regional finals Elite 8 March 31
1	~~Louisville~~	85
2	Duke	63

==== Midwest regional final ====
CBS

March 31
5:05 p.m. EDT

Recap

#2 Duke Blue Devils 63, ~~#1 Louisville Cardinals~~ 85
Scoring by half: 32–35, 31–50
Pts: M. Plumlee, 17; Rebs: M. Plumlee, 12; Asts: Q. Cook, 5	Pts: R. Smith, 23; Rebs: G. Dieng, 11; Asts: P. Siva, 4

Lucas Oil Stadium – Indianapolis, Indiana
Attendance: 34,657
Referees: Tony Greene, Doug Shows, Scott Thornley

==== Midwest Regional all-tournament team ====
Regional all-tournament team: Seth Curry, Duke; Gorgui Dieng, Louisville; Mason Plumlee, Duke; Peyton Siva, Louisville

Regional most outstanding player: Russ Smith, Louisville

=== West Regional – Los Angeles, California ===
First round Round of 64; March 21–22
1	Gonzaga	64
16	Southern	58
Salt Lake City – Thu/Sat
8	Pittsburgh	55
9	Wichita State	73
5	Wisconsin	46
12	Ole Miss	57
Kansas City – Fri/Sun
4	Kansas State	61
13	La Salle	63
6	Arizona	81
11	Belmont	64
Salt Lake City – Thu/Sat
3	New Mexico	62
14	Harvard	68
7	Notre Dame	58
10	Iowa State	76
Dayton – Fri/Sun
2	Ohio State	95
15	Iona	70

Second round Round of 32; March 23–24
1	Gonzaga	70
9	Wichita State	76
12	Ole Miss	74
13	La Salle	76
6	Arizona	74
14	Harvard	51
10	Iowa State	75
2	Ohio State	78

Regional semifinals Sweet 16; March 28
9	Wichita State	72
13	La Salle	58
6	Arizona	70
2	Ohio State	73

Regional finals Elite 8 March 30
9	Wichita State	70
2	Ohio State	66

==== West regional final ====
CBS

March 30
7:05 p.m. EDT

Recap

#9 Wichita State Shockers 70, #2 Ohio State Buckeyes 66
Scoring by half: 35–22, 35–44
Pts: M. Armstead, 14; Rebs: tied, 7 Asts: M. Armstead, 3	Pts: D. Thomas, 23; Rebs: tied, 7 Asts: D. Thomas, 3

Staples Center – Los Angeles, California
Attendance: 17,998
Referees: Jamie Luckie, Pat Adams, Ray Natili

==== West Regional all-tournament team ====
Regional all-tournament team: Carl Hall, Wichita State; Mark Lyons, Arizona; LaQuinton Ross, Ohio State; Deshaun Thomas, Ohio State

Regional most outstanding player: Malcolm Armstead, Wichita State

=== South Regional – Arlington, Texas ===
First round Round of 64; March 21–22
1	Kansas	64
16	Western Kentucky	57
Kansas City – Fri/Sun
8	North Carolina	78
9	Villanova	71
5	VCU	88
12	Akron	42
Auburn Hills – Thu/Sat
4	Michigan	71
13	South Dakota State	56
6	UCLA	63
11	Minnesota	83
Austin – Fri/Sun
3	Florida	79
14	Northwestern State	47
7	San Diego State	70
10	Oklahoma	55
Philadelphia – Fri/Sun
2	Georgetown	68
15	Florida Gulf Coast	78

Second round Round of 32; March 23–24
1	Kansas	70
8	North Carolina	58
5	VCU	53
4	Michigan	78
11	Minnesota	64
3	Florida	78
7	San Diego State	71
15	Florida Gulf Coast	81

Regional semifinals Sweet 16; March 29
1	Kansas	85
4	Michigan	87^{OT}
3	Florida	62
15	Florida Gulf Coast	50

Regional finals Elite 8 March 31
4	Michigan	79
3	Florida	59

==== South regional final ====
CBS

March 31
2:20 p.m. EDT

Recap

#4 Michigan Wolverines 79, #3 Florida Gators 59
Scoring by half: 47–30, 32–29
Pts: N. Stauskas, 22; Rebs: M. McGary, 9 Asts: T. Burke, 7	Pts: tied, 13; Rebs: E. Murphy, 8 Asts: S. Wilbekin, 7

Cowboys Stadium – Arlington, Texas
Attendance: 36,585
Referees: John Cahill, Bryan Kersey, Roger Ayers

==== South Regional all-tournament team ====
Regional all-tournament team: Mitch McGary, Michigan; Ben McLemore, Kansas; Mike Rosario, Florida; Nik Stauskas, Michigan

Regional most outstanding player: Trey Burke, Michigan

=== East Regional – Washington, D.C. ===
First round Round of 64; March 21–22
1	Indiana	83
16	James Madison	62
Dayton – Fri/Sun
8	NC State	72
9	Temple	76
5	UNLV	61
12	California	64
San Jose – Thu/Sat
4	Syracuse	81
13	Montana	34
6	Butler	68
11	Bucknell	56
Lexington – Thu/Sat
3	Marquette	59
14	Davidson	58
7	Illinois	57
10	Colorado	49
Austin – Fri/Sun
2	Miami (FL)	78
15	Pacific	49

Second round Round of 32; March 23–24
1	Indiana	58
9	Temple	52
12	California	60
4	Syracuse	66
6	Butler	72
3	Marquette	74
7	Illinois	59
2	Miami (FL)	63

Regional semifinals Sweet 16; March 28
1	Indiana	50
4	Syracuse	61
3	Marquette	71
2	Miami (FL)	61

Regional finals Elite 8 March 30
4	Syracuse	55
3	Marquette	39

==== East regional final ====
CBS

March 30
4:30 p.m. EDT

Recap

#4 Syracuse Orange 55, #3 Marquette Golden Eagles 39
Scoring by half: 24–18, 31–21
Pts: J. Southerland, 16; Rebs: M. Carter-Williams, 8 Asts: M. Carter-Williams, 6	Pts: tied, 14; Rebs: D. Gardner, 8 Asts: tied, 2

Verizon Center – Washington, D.C.
Attendance: 19,801
Referees: John Higgins, Verne Harris, Randy McCall

==== East Regional all-tournament team ====
Regional all-tournament team: Vander Blue, Marquette; C. J. Fair, Syracuse; Davante Gardner, Marquette; James Southerland, Syracuse

Regional most outstanding player: Michael Carter-Williams, Syracuse

=== Final Four – Georgia Dome, Atlanta, Georgia ===
During the Final Four round, the champion of the top overall top seed's region was to play against the champion of the fourth-ranked top seed's region, and the champion of the second overall top seed's region was to play against the champion of the third-ranked top seed's region. Louisville (placed in the Midwest Regional) was selected as the top overall seed, and Gonzaga (in the West Regional) was named as the final top seed. Thus, the Midwest champion played the West Champion in one semifinal game, and the South Champion faced the East Champion in the other semifinal game.

Wichita State surprised the college basketball world by reaching the Final Four from the West region. They lost to Louisville in the first semifinal game, 72–68. Michigan defeated Syracuse 61–56 in the second semifinal.

National Semifinals; Final Four; Saturday, April 6
MW1	~~Louisville~~	72
W9	Wichita State	68
S4	Michigan	61
E4	Syracuse	56

National Championship Game; Monday, April 8
MW1	~~Louisville~~	82
S4	Michigan	76

On February 20, 2018, the NCAA announced that the wins and records for Louisville's 2011–12, 2012–13, 2013–14, and 2014–15 seasons were officially vacated due to the sex scandal at Louisville, and a failed appeal by Louisville. Unlike forfeiture, a vacated game does not result in the other school being credited with a win, only with Louisville removing the wins from its own record.

==== Final Four all-tournament team ====
Final Four all-tournament team: Spike Albrecht, Michigan; Trey Burke, Michigan; Mitch McGary, Michigan; Cleanthony Early, Wichita State; Peyton Siva, Louisville; Luke Hancock, Louisville; Chane Behanan, Louisville

Final Four most outstanding player: Luke Hancock, Louisville (the first non-starter to earn this title)

== Game summaries ==
=== Final Four ===
CBS

April 6
6:09 pm EDT

Recap

#W9 Wichita State Shockers 68, ~~#MW1 Louisville Cardinals~~ 72
Scoring by half: 26–25, 42–47
Pts: C. Early, 24; Rebs: C. Early, 10; Asts: M. Armstead, 7	Pts: R. Smith, 21; Rebs: C. Behanan, 9 Asts: R. Smith, 3

Georgia Dome – Atlanta, GA
Referees: Karl Hess, Terry Wymer, Les Jones

CBS

April 6
9:21 pm EDT

Recap

#E4 Syracuse Orange 56, #S4 Michigan Wolverines 61
Scoring by half: 25–36, 31–25
Pts: C. Fair, 22; Rebs: J. Grant, 7 Asts: B. Triche, 8	Pts: Hardaway Jr., 13; Rebs: M. McGary, 12; Asts: M. McGary, 6

Georgia Dome – Atlanta, GA
Attendance: 75,350
Referees: Mark Whitehead, Doug Sirmons, Randy Mccall

=== National Championship ===
CBS

April 8
9:23pm EDT

Recap

#S4 Michigan Wolverines 76, #MW1 Louisville Cardinals 82
Scoring by half: 38–37, 38–45
Pts: Burke, 24; Rebs: McGary, 6 Asts: Hardaway Jr., 4	Pts: Hancock, 22; Rebs: Behanan, 12; Asts: Dieng, 6

Georgia Dome – Atlanta, GA
Attendance: 74,326
Referees: John Cahill, John Higgins, Tony Greene

Louisville defeated Michigan 82–76 in the championship game. The win gave Louisville its first championship since 1986, and third overall. It became the eighth school to win at least three championships until vacated by the NCAA on February 20, 2018, due to a 2015 sex scandal.

Until the 2018 announcement of no winner, head coach Rick Pitino became the first coach to win an NCAA championship with two different schools. Michigan fell to 1–5 all time in championship games (including two losses vacated because of sanctions against the university, but officially 1–3).

Michigan's Trey Burke scored seven quick points to get Michigan out to a 7–3 lead, but also picked up two quick fouls and sat during much of the first half. With Burke on the bench, Michigan got a spark from freshman Spike Albrecht, a minor role player during the regular season. Albrecht hit four straight 3-pointers en route to a 17-point first half performance, easily surpassing his previous single game best of 7. Louisville trailed Michigan 35–23 late in the first half, before going on a run fueled by four straight three-pointers by Luke Hancock. At halftime, Michigan led 38–37.

The second half featured several lead changes before Louisville pushed the margin to 10 on a three-pointer by Hancock with 3:20 remaining in the game. Michigan fought back, closing the gap to four points in the last minute, but ran out of time in its comeback effort.

Hancock hit all five three-point shots he attempted in the game and led Louisville with 22 points, while teammate Peyton Siva scored 18 and had a game high 4 steals. Chane Behanan pulled down 12 rebounds to go with 15 points. Burke led Michigan with 24 points. Russ Smith, Louisville's leading scorer on the season, struggled in the game, shooting 3-for-16. Hancock was named as the game's most outstanding player.

== Upsets ==
Per the NCAA, "Upsets are defined as when the winner of the game was seeded five or more places lower than the team it defeated."

The 2013 tournament saw a total of 11 upsets, with seven in the first round, three in the second round, and one in the Elite Eight.

Upsets in the 2013 NCAA Division I men's basketball tournament
Round	Midwest	West	South	East
Round of 64	No. 12 Oregon defeated No. 5 Oklahoma State, 68–55	No. 14 Harvard defeated No. 3 New Mexico, 68–62; No. 13 La Salle defeated No. 4 Kansas State, 63–61; No. 12 Ole Miss defeated No. 5 Wisconsin, 57–46	No. 15 Florida Gulf Coast defeated No. 2 Georgetown, 78–68; No. 11 Minnesota defeated No. 6 UCLA, 83–63	No. 12 California defeated No. 5 UNLV, 64–61
Round of 32	No. 12 Oregon defeated No. 4 Saint Louis, 74–57	No. 9 Wichita State defeated No. 1 Gonzaga, 76–70	No. 15 Florida Gulf Coast defeated No. 7 San Diego State, 81–71	None
Sweet 16	None			
Elite 8	None	No. 9 Wichita State defeated No. 2 Ohio State, 70–66	None	
Final 4	None			
National Championship	None			

== Record by conference ==
Conference	Bids	Record	Win %	R64	R32	S16	E8	F4	CG	NC
Big East	8	13–7	.650	8	3	3	3	2	1	1
Big Ten	7	14–7	.667	7	6	4	2	1	1	–
MVC	2	5–2	.714	2	2	1	1	1	–	–
ACC	4	6–4	.600	4	3	2	1	–	–	–
SEC	3	4–3	.571	3	2	1	1	–	–	–
Pac-12	5	5–5	.500	5	3	2	–	–	–	–
Atlantic Sun	1	2–1	.667	1	1	1	–	–	–	–
Atlantic 10	5	7–5	.583	5	5	1	–	–	–	–
Big 12	5	3–5	.375	5	2	1	–	–	–	–
Mountain West	5	2–5	.286	4	2	–	–	–	–	–
WCC	2	2–2	.500	2	1	–	–	–	–	–
Ivy	1	1–1	.500	1	1	–	–	–	–	–
C-USA	1	1–1	.500	1	1	–	–	–	–	–
CAA	1	1–1	.500	1	–	–	–	–	–	–
MEAC	1	1–1	.500	1	–	–	–	–	–	–

- The R64, R32, S16, E8, F4, CG, and NC columns indicate how many teams from each conference were in the round of 64 (second round), round of 32 (third round), Sweet 16, Elite Eight, Final Four, championship game, and national champion, respectively.
- The Big South and NEC each had one representative, eliminated in the first round with a record of 0–1.
- The America East Conference, Big Sky, Big West, Horizon League, MAAC, MAC, OVC, Patriot League, Southern Conference, Southland Conference, Summit League, SWAC, and WAC each had one representative, eliminated in the second round with a record of 0–1.
- The Sun Belt Conference had two representatives, one eliminated in the first round and the other in the second round, with a record of 0–2.

== Other events surrounding the tournament ==
On May 10, 2012, the NCAA announced that as part of the celebration of the 75th Division I tournament, it would hold all three of its men's basketball championship games in Atlanta. The finals of the Division II and Division III tournaments were held at Philips Arena on April 7, the day between the Division I semifinals and final. In addition, Atlanta-based tournament broadcaster TBS announced that Conan O'Brien would tape his Conan talk show at the Tabernacle, located a few blocks from the Georgia Dome and Philips Arena, in the week leading up to the Final Four. March Madness studio analyst Charles Barkley and Dick Vitale were among the guests who appeared.

== Media ==
=== U.S. television ===
The year 2013 marked the third year of a 14-year partnership between CBS and Turner cable networks TBS, TNT and truTV to cover the entire tournament under the NCAA March Madness banner. CBS aired the Final Four and championship rounds for the 32nd consecutive year. The tournament was considered a ratings success. Tournament games averaged 10.7 million viewers, and the championship game garnered an average of 23.4 million viewers and a peak viewership of 27.1 million.

==== Studio hosts ====
- Greg Gumbel (New York City and Atlanta) – second round, third round, regionals, Final Four and national championship game
- Ernie Johnson Jr. (New York City and Atlanta) – First Four, second round, third round and Regional Semi-Finals
- Matt Winer (Atlanta) – First Four, second round and third round

==== Studio analysts ====
- Greg Anthony (New York City and Atlanta) – First Four, second round, third round, regionals, Final Four and national championship game
- Charles Barkley (New York City and Atlanta) – First Four, second round, third round, regionals, Final Four and national championship game
- Rex Chapman (Atlanta) – First Four and Second Round
- Seth Davis (Atlanta) – First Four, second round, third round and Regional Semi-Finals
- Jamie Dixon (Atlanta) – third round
- Doug Gottlieb (New York City and Atlanta) – Regionals, Final Four and national championship game
- Kenny Smith (New York City and Atlanta) – second round, third round, regionals, Final Four and national championship game
- Steve Smith (Atlanta) – First Four, second round, third round and regional semi-finals
- Jay Wright (Atlanta) – Regional semi-finals

==== Commentary teams ====
- Jim Nantz/Clark Kellogg/Steve Kerr/Tracy Wolfson – First Four, Second and third round at Dayton, Ohio; Midwest Regional at Indianapolis, Indiana; Final Four at Atlanta, Georgia
  Kerr joined Nantz and Kellogg during the Final Four and national championship games
- Marv Albert/Steve Kerr/Craig Sager – First Four at Dayton, Ohio; Second and third round at Kansas City, Missouri; South Regional at Arlington, Texas
- Verne Lundquist/Bill Raftery/Rachel Nichols – Second and third round at Auburn Hills, Michigan; East Regional at Washington, D.C.
- Kevin Harlan/Len Elmore/Reggie Miller/Lewis Johnson – Second and third round at Philadelphia, Pennsylvania; West Regional at Los Angeles, California
- Ian Eagle/Jim Spanarkel/Allie LaForce – Second and third round at Lexington, Kentucky
- Brian Anderson/Dan Bonner/Marty Snider – Second and third round at San Jose, California
- Tim Brando/Mike Gminski/Otis Livingston – Second and third round at Austin, Texas
- Spero Dedes/Doug Gottlieb/Jaime Maggio – Second and third round at Salt Lake City, Utah

=== Radio ===
Dial Global Sports (formerly Westwood One) and SiriusXM have live broadcasts of all 67 games.

==== First four ====
- Brad Sham and Kyle Macy – at Dayton, Ohio

==== Second and third rounds ====
- Tom McCarthy and Kelly Tripucka – Second and third round at Auburn Hills, Michigan
- Kevin Kugler and Jamal Mashburn – Second and third round at Lexington, Kentucky
- Dave Sims and Kevin Grevey – Second and third round at Salt Lake City, Utah
- Ted Robinson and Bill Frieder – Second and third round at San Jose, California
- Gary Cohen and Pete Gillen – Second and third round at Dayton, Ohio
- Wayne Larrivee and Reid Gettys – Second and third round at Austin, Texas
- Kevin Calabro and Will Perdue – Second and third round at Kansas City, Missouri
- Scott Graham and John Thompson – Second and third round at Philadelphia, Pennsylvania

==== Regionals ====
- Ian Eagle and John Thompson – East Regional at Washington, D.C.
- Kevin Kugler and Pete Gillen – Midwest Regional at Indianapolis, Indiana
- Brad Sham and Fran Fraschilla – South Regional at Arlington, Texas
- Wayne Larrivee and Bill Frieder – West Regional at Los Angeles, California

==== Final Four ====
- Kevin Kugler, John Thompson and Bill Raftery – Atlanta, Georgia

=== Local radio ===
- Matt Shephard and David Merritt – (Michigan), (WWJ), (Detroit) & (WWWW), (Ann Arbor)
- Paul Rogers and Bob Valvano – (Louisville), (WHAS), (Louisville) & (WWRW), (Lexington)

=== International ===
ESPN International held broadcast rights to the tournament outside of the United States: it produced its own broadcasts of the semi-final and championship game, called by ESPN College Basketball personalities Brad Nessler (play-by-play), Dick Vitale (analyst for the final and one semi-final), and Jay Bilas (analyst for the other semi-final). For the initial rounds, they use CBS/Turner coverage with an additional host to transition between games, with whiparound coverage similar to the CBS-only era. ESPN also has exclusive digital rights to the NCAA tournament outside of North America.

==== Canada ====
In Canada, the TSN family of media outlets (including TSN2, RDS, and TSN Radio), which are part-owned by ESPN, own broadcast rights to the tournament. TSN produces separate studio coverage with Kate Beirness, Jack Armstrong, Dan Shulman and Sam Mitchell, but simulcasts CBS/Turner game coverage for the first five rounds (and ESPN International coverage for the Final Four).

As in past years, TSN and TSN2 carry whiparound coverage (often in parallel) during the second, third and fourth rounds, in 2013 focusing when possible on games not being broadcast on CBS (as that network, but not the Turner channels, is also widely available in Canada).

== See also ==
- 2013 NCAA Division II men's basketball tournament
- 2013 NCAA Division III men's basketball tournament
- 2013 NCAA Division I women's basketball tournament
- 2013 NCAA Division II women's basketball tournament
- 2013 NCAA Division III women's basketball tournament
- 2013 National Invitation Tournament
- 2013 Women's National Invitation Tournament
- 2013 NAIA Division I men's basketball tournament
- 2013 NAIA Division II men's basketball tournament
- 2013 NAIA Division I women's basketball tournament
- 2013 NAIA Division II women's basketball tournament
- 2013 College Basketball Invitational
- 2013 CollegeInsider.com Postseason Tournament
