= 2012–13 Canisius Golden Griffins men's basketball team =

American college basketball season

2012–13 Canisius Golden Griffins men's basketball
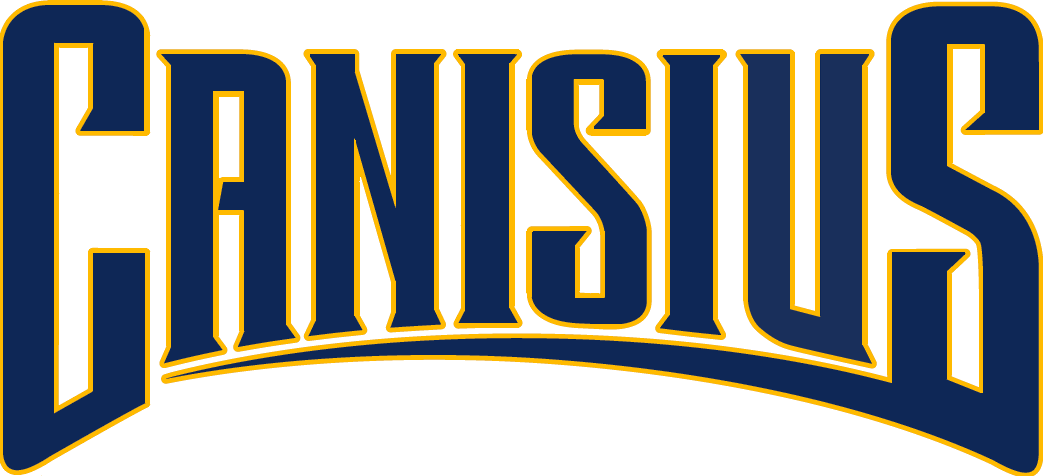

CIT, Quarterfinals
- Conference: Metro Atlantic Athletic Conference
- Record: 20–14 (11–7 MAAC)
- Head coach: Jim Baron (1st season)
- Assistant coaches: Pat Clarke; Fred Dupree; Mike Mennenga
- Home arena: Koessler Athletic Center

2012–13 MAAC men's basketball standings
	Conf.				Overall
Team	W		L	PCT	W		L	PCT
Niagara	13	–	5	.722	19	–	14	.576
Loyola (MD)	12	–	6	.667	23	–	12	.657
Rider	12	–	6	.667	19	–	15	.559
Canisius	11	–	7	.611	20	–	14	.588
Iona †	11	–	7	.611	20	–	14	.588
Fairfield	9	–	9	.500	19	–	16	.543
Manhattan	9	–	9	.500	14	–	18	.438
Marist	6	–	12	.333	10	–	21	.323
Siena	4	–	14	.222	8	–	24	.250
Saint Peter's	3	–	15	.167	9	–	21	.300
† 2013 MAAC tournament winner Rankings from AP Poll

The 2012–13 Canisius Golden Griffins men's basketball team represented Canisius College during the 2012–13 NCAA Division I men's basketball season. The Golden Griffins, led by first year head coach Jim Baron, played their home games at the Koessler Athletic Center and were members of the Metro Atlantic Athletic Conference. They finished the season 20–14, 11–7 in MAAC play to finish in a tie for fourth place. They lost in the quarterfinals of the 2013 MAAC tournament to Iona. They were invited to the 2013 CIT where they defeated Elon and Youngstown State to advance to the quarterfinals where they lost to Evansville.

== Roster ==
Number	Name	Position	Height	Weight	Year	Hometown
1	Freddy Asprilla	Forward	6–10	280	Senior	Villavicencio, Colombia
3	Harold Washington	Guard	6–1	175	Senior	Brandywine, Maryland
4	Jermaine Johnson	Guard	5–10	150	Freshman	Stone Mountain, Georgia
5	Reggie Groves	Guard	6–2	188	Junior	Raleigh, North Carolina
10	Tyrel Edwards	Forward	6–5	195	Sophomore	Hamilton, Ontario
11	Alshwan Hymes	Guard	6–2	203	Senior	DeWitt, New York
12	Billy Baron	Guard	6–2	195	Junior	East Greenwich, Rhode Island
13	Chris Manhertz	Forward	6–6	235	Junior	The Bronx, New York
14	Kevin Bleeker	Center	6–10	225	Sophomore	Alkmaar, Netherlands
22	Isaac Sosa	Guard	6–3	180	Senior	Guaynabo, Puerto Rico
23	Phil Valenti	Forward	6–7	195	Freshman	Victor, New York
32	Dominique Raney	Guard	6–4	180	Sophomore	Oklahoma City, Oklahoma
35	Jordan Heath	Forward	6–10	225	Junior	Rochester, New York
50	Josiah Heath	Forward	6–9	230	Sophomore	Rochester, New York

== Schedule ==
Date time, TV	Opponent	Result	Record	Site (attendance) city, state
Exhibition
11/02/2012*; 7:00 pm	Ryerson	W 77–54		Koessler Athletic Center (838); Buffalo, NY
11/08/2012*; 7:00 pm	Eckerd	W 87–63		Koessler Athletic Center (797); Buffalo, NY
Regular season
11/12/2012*; 7:00 pm	Boston University	W 83–75	1–0	Koessler Athletic Center (1,422); Buffalo, NY
11/17/2012*; 4:00 pm	St. Bonaventure	W 72–69	2–0	Koessler Athletic Center (2,196); Buffalo, NY
11/20/2012*; 8:00 pm	Buffalo	W 71–64	3–0	Koessler Athletic Center (2,196); Buffalo, NY
11/24/2012*; 2:00 pm	at Stony Brook	L 75–82	3–1	Pritchard Gymnasium (1,014); Stony Brook, NY
11/29/2012*; 7:00 pm	at UMBC	W 83–65	4–1	Retriever Activities Center (1,520); Catonsville, MD
12/07/2012; 7:00 pm	at Fairfield	W 67–55	5–1 (1–0)	Webster Bank Arena (2,684); Bridgeport, CT
12/09/2012; 2:00 pm	at Marist	W 94–82	6–1 (2–0)	McCann Field House (1,210); Poughkeepsie, NY
12/15/2012*; 7:00 pm, ESPN3	at No. 4 Syracuse; Gotham Classic	L 61–85	6–2	Carrier Dome (18,120); Syracuse, NY
12/17/2012*; 7:00 pm	Longwood	W 82–54	7–2	Koessler Athletic Center (1,205); Buffalo, NY
12/19/2012*; 7:00 pm	at Temple; Gotham Classic	W 72–62	8–2	Liacouras Center (3,258); Philadelphia, PA
12/22/2012*; 10:00 pm	at No. 21 UNLV	L 74–89	8–3	Thomas & Mack Center (14,533); Paradise, NV
12/27/2012*; 7:00 pm	Alcorn State; Gotham Classic	W 87–74	9–3	Koessler Athletic Center (1,388); Buffalo, NY
12/30/2012*; 3:00 pm	at Detroit; Gotham Classic	L 78–83	9–4	Calihan Hall (2,717); Detroit, MI
01/03/2013; 7:00 pm	Fairfield	L 45–66	9–5 (2–1)	Koessler Athletic Center (1,106); Buffalo, NY
01/05/2013; 7:00 pm	Marist	W 73–64	10–5 (3–1)	Koessler Athletic Center (1,401); Buffalo, NY
01/11/2013; 7:00 pm	at Siena	L 54–57	10–6 (3–2)	Times Union Center (5,986); Albany, NY
01/13/2013; 2:00 pm	at Iona	L 87–97	10–7 (3–3)	Hynes Athletic Center (2,094); New Rochelle, NY
01/17/2013; 7:00 pm	Manhattan	W 64–60	11–7 (4–3)	Koessler Athletic Center (1,370); Buffalo, NY
01/19/2013; 2:00 pm	Siena	W 76–44	12–7 (5–3)	Koessler Athletic Center (2,001); Buffalo, NY
01/25/2013; 7:00 pm	at Rider	W 67–50	13–7 (6–3)	Alumni Gymnasium (1,025); Lawrenceville, NJ
01/27/2013; 4:00 pm, ESPN3	Niagara; Battle of the Bridge	L 65–66	13–8 (6–4)	Koessler Athletic Center (2,196); Buffalo, NY
01/31/2013; 7:00 pm	Loyola (MD)	W 91–79	14–8 (7–4)	Koessler Athletic Center (1,303); Buffalo, NY
02/02/2013; 7:00 pm	Iona	W 77–74	15–8 (8–4)	Koessler Athletic Center (1,852); Buffalo, NY
02/07/2013; 7:00 pm, ESPN3	at Manhattan	L 54–67	15–9 (8–5)	Draddy Gymnasium (1,304); Riverdale, NY
02/10/2013; 2:00 pm	at Niagara; Battle of the Bridge	W 77–70	16–9 (9–5)	Gallagher Center (2,400); Lewiston, NY
02/14/2013; 7:30 pm	at Loyola (MD)	L 64–68	16–10 (9–6)	Reitz Arena (824); Baltimore, MD
02/16/2013; 2:00 pm	at Saint Peter's	W 68–59	17–10 (10–6)	Yanitelli Center (653); Jersey City, NJ
02/23/2013*; 1:00 pm, ESPN3	at Vermont; BracketBusters	L 79–87	17–11	Patrick Gym (2,198); Burlington, VT
02/28/2013; 7:00 pm, ESPN3	Saint Peter's	W 77–65 ^{OT}	18–11 (11–6)	Koessler Athletic Center (1,483); Buffalo, NY
03/02/2013; 2:00 pm	Rider	L 61–65	18–12 (11–7)	Koessler Athletic Center (1,561); Buffalo, NY
MAAC tournament
03/09/2013; 4:30 pm, ESPN3	vs. Iona; Quarterfinals	L 85–89	18–13	MassMutual Center (1,900); Springfield, MA
2013 CIT
03/20/2013*; 7:00 pm	Elon; First Round	W 69–53	19–13	Koessler Athletic Center (1,187); Buffalo, NY
03/23/2013*; 7:05 pm	at Youngstown State; Second Round	W 84–82 ^{OT}	20–13	Beeghly Center (2,596); Youngstown, OH
03/26/2013*; 7:00 pm	Evansville; Quarterfinals	L 83–84	20–14	Koessler Athletic Center (1,403); Buffalo, NY
*Non-conference game. ^{#}Rankings from AP Poll. (#) Tournament seedings in parentheses. All times are in Eastern Time.
