= 2012–13 Marist Red Foxes men's basketball team =

American college basketball season

2012–13 Marist Red Foxes men's basketball
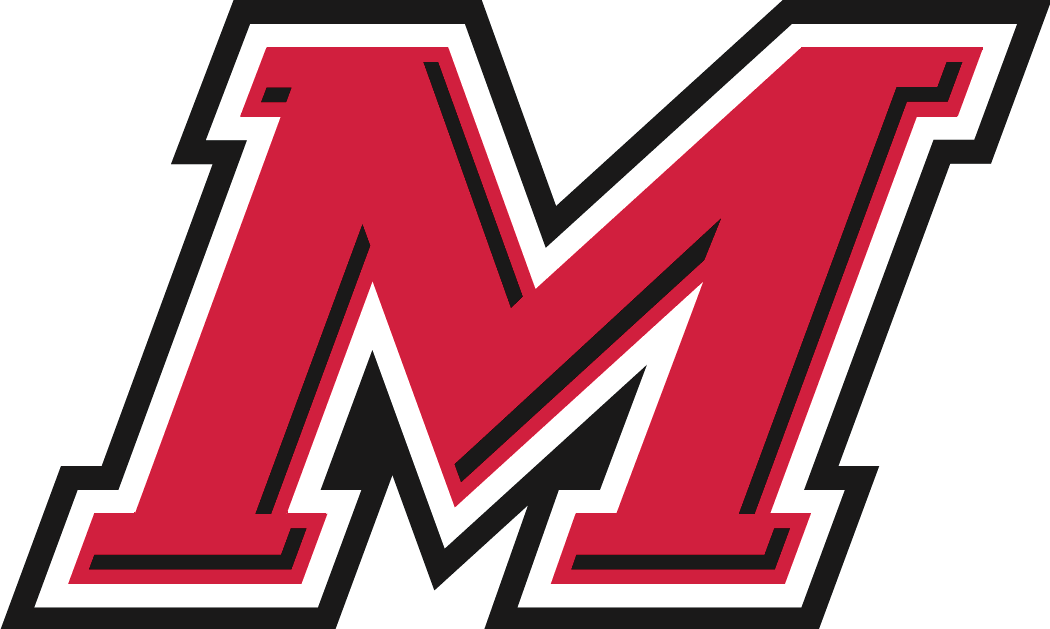
- Conference: Metro Atlantic Athletic Conference
- Record: 10–21 (6–12 MAAC)
- Head coach: Chuck Martin (5th season)
- Assistant coaches: Ron Johnson; Will Lanier; Paul Lee
- Home arena: McCann Arena

2012–13 MAAC men's basketball standings
	Conf.				Overall
Team	W		L	PCT	W		L	PCT
Niagara	13	–	5	.722	19	–	14	.576
Loyola (MD)	12	–	6	.667	23	–	12	.657
Rider	12	–	6	.667	19	–	15	.559
Canisius	11	–	7	.611	20	–	14	.588
Iona †	11	–	7	.611	20	–	14	.588
Fairfield	9	–	9	.500	19	–	16	.543
Manhattan	9	–	9	.500	14	–	18	.438
Marist	6	–	12	.333	10	–	21	.323
Siena	4	–	14	.222	8	–	24	.250
Saint Peter's	3	–	15	.167	9	–	21	.300
† 2013 MAAC tournament winner Rankings from AP Poll

The 2012–13 Marist Red Foxes men's basketball team represented Marist College during the 2012–13 NCAA Division I men's basketball season. The Red Foxes, led by fifth year head coach Chuck Martin, played their home games at the McCann Arena and were members of the Metro Atlantic Athletic Conference. The Red Foxes finished the season 10–21, 6–12 in MAAC play to finish eighth place. They lost in the first round of the MAAC tournament to Siena.

On March 14, 2013, head coach Chuck Martin was fired. He posted a record of 41–118 in five seasons. On April 10, 2013, Marist hired Jeff Bower as their new head coach.

== Previous season ==
The Red Foxes finished the 2011–12 season 14–18, 7–11 in MAAC play to finish in eighth place. They advanced to the quarterfinals of the MAAC tournament where they lost to Iona.

== Roster ==
2012–13 Marist Red Foxes men's basketball team
Players
Coaches

Pos.	#	Name	Height	Weight	Year	Previous school	Hometown
G	0	Devin Price	6 ft 1 in (1.85 m)	170 lb (77 kg)	Sr	St. Bernard Catholic (CA)	Inglewood, California
G/F	1	Dorvell Carter	6 ft 6 in (1.98 m)	200 lb (91 kg)	Sr	Rice (NY)	Bronx, New York
G	5	Khalid Hart (redshirt)	6 ft 2 in (1.88 m)	180 lb (82 kg)	Fr	Sanford School	Newark, Delaware
G	11	Isaiah Morton	5 ft 8 in (1.73 m)	170 lb (77 kg)	So	St. Augustine Prep	Vineland, New Jersey
G	13	Rob Delle Bovi (W)	6 ft 0 in (1.83 m)	165 lb (75 kg)	Jr	Pleasantville	Briarcliff Manor, New York
G	14	Jesse Martin (W)	6 ft 2 in (1.88 m)	180 lb (82 kg)	Sr	Wilde Lake	Columbia, Maryland
F	15	Anell Alexis	6 ft 6 in (1.98 m)	185 lb (84 kg)	Jr	St. Benedict's Prep	Hillsborough, New Jersey
G/F	20	Jay Bowie	6 ft 5 in (1.96 m)	210 lb (95 kg)	Jr	Tampa Prep	Tampa, Florida
G	21	Tourron Whitfield (W)	6 ft 2 in (1.88 m)	170 lb (77 kg)	So	Archbishop Molloy	Valley Stream, New York
G/F	24	Manny Thomas	6 ft 5 in (1.96 m)	190 lb (86 kg)	So	Xaverian	Brooklyn, New York
G/F	30	Patrick Ramsey (W)	6 ft 4 in (1.93 m)	185 lb (84 kg)	Jr	Easthampton	Easthampton, Massachusetts
G	32	T.J. Curry	6 ft 1 in (1.85 m)	190 lb (86 kg)	So	Christ the King	Brooklyn, New York
F	34	Pieter Prinsloo	6 ft 10 in (2.08 m)	225 lb (102 kg)	Jr	Dover (DE)	Johannesburg, South Africa
F	35	Phillip Lawrence-Ricks	6 ft 7 in (2.01 m)	190 lb (86 kg)	Fr	Mount St. Joseph, MD	Baltimore, Maryland
G/F	40	Chavaughn Lewis	6 ft 5 in (1.96 m)	185 lb (84 kg)	So	St. Mary's (Manhasset, NY)	Queens, New York
C	44	Eric Truog	6 ft 10 in (2.08 m)	240 lb (109 kg)	Fr	Kenston	Chagrin Falls, Ohio
F	50	Adam Kemp	6 ft 10 in (2.08 m)	235 lb (107 kg)	Jr	Winchendon School (MA)	Sherrill, New York

Head coach

- Chuck Martin (Monmouth, 5th yr., 1993)

Assistant coach(es)

- Will Lanier (Georgia Tech, 5th yr., 2004)
- Ron Johnson (Barry, 1st yr., 1989)
- Paul Lee (Columbia, 5th yr., 1986)

Legend

- (C) Team captain
- (S) Suspended
- (I) Ineligible
- (W) Walk-on
- Injured
- Current redshirt

Roster
Last update: 2019-02-10

== Schedule ==
Date time, TV	Rank^{#}	Opponent^{#}	Result	Record	Site (attendance) city, state
Regular season
11/09/2012*; 9:00 pm		Stony Brook	L 57–60	0–1	McCann Arena (1,904); Poughkeepsie, NY
11/14/2012*; 7:00 pm		at Colgate	L 60–74	0–2	Cotterell Court (422); Hamilton, NY
11/17/2012*; 7:00 pm		at Columbia	W 67–62	1–2	Levien Gymnasium (1,265); New York City, NY
11/22/2012*; 12:00 pm, ESPN2		vs. West Virginia; Old Spice Classic	L 44–87	1–3	HP Field House (3,423); Orlando, FL
11/23/2012*; 3:00 pm, ESPNU		vs. Vanderbilt; Old Spice Classic	W 50–33	2–3	HP Field House (2,927); Orlando, FL
11/25/2012*; 11:30 am, ESPNU		at Clemson; Old Spice Classic	L 44–59	2–4	HP Field House (1,080); Orlando, FL
12/04/2012*; 7:00 pm		at Army	L 57–91	2–5	Christl Arena (646); West Point, NY
12/07/2012; 7:00 pm		Manhattan	W 62–58	3–5 (1–0)	McCann Arena (1,687); Poughkeepsie, NY
12/09/2012; 2:00 pm		Canisius	L 82–94	3–6 (1–1)	McCann Arena (1,210); Poughkeepsie, NY
12/16/2012*; 2:00 pm		Maine	W 94–69	4–6	McCann Arena (1,021); Poughkeepsie, NY
12/19/2012*; 7:00 pm		at Bucknell	L 65–71	4–7	Sojka Pavilion (2,724); Lewisburg, PA
12/22/2012*; 3:30 pm		at Hartford	L 46–56	4–8	Chase Arena at Reich Family Pavilion (3,508); Hartford, CT
12/31/2012*; 4:00 pm		College of Charleston	L 75–85	4–9	McCann Arena (1,062); Poughkeepsie, NY
01/03/2013; 7:00 pm		at Niagara	L 72–94	4–10 (1–2)	Gallagher Center (1,159); Lewiston, NY
01/05/2013; 7:00 pm		at Canisius	L 64–73	4–11 (1–3)	Koessler Athletic Center (1,401); Buffalo, NY
01/10/2013; 7:00 pm		Iona	L 82–86	4–12 (1–4)	McCann Arena (1,103); Poughkeepsie, NY
01/13/2013; 2:00 pm		at Manhattan	L 53–65	4–13 (1–5)	Draddy Gymnasium (1,617); Riverdale, NY
01/17/2013; 7:30 pm		at Loyola (MD)	L 58–72	4–14 (1–6)	Reitz Arena (1,312); Baltimore, MD
01/19/2013; 7:00 pm, ESPN3		Saint Peter's	W 59–48	5–14 (2–6)	McCann Arena (1,202); Poughkeepsie, NY
01/24/2013; 7:00 pm, ESPN3		at Fairfield	L 37–71	5–15 (2–7)	Webster Bank Arena (1,266); Bridgeport, CT
01/27/2013; 2:00 pm		Siena	L 75–79	5–16 (2–8)	McCann Arena (1,747); Poughkeepsie, NY
01/31/2013; 7:00 pm		at Saint Peter's	L 68–70 ^{OT}	5–17 (2–9)	Yanitelli Center (953); Jersey City, NJ
02/03/2013; 2:00 pm		Rider	L 58–64	5–18 (2–10)	McCann Arena (1,133); Poughkeepsie, NY
02/07/2013; 7:00 pm		at Iona	W 105–104 ^{2OT}	6–18 (3–10)	Hynes Athletic Center (2,875); New Rochelle, NY
02/10/2013; 2:00 pm		Loyola (MD)	W 69–64	7–18 (4–10)	McCann Arena (1,564); Poughkeepsie, NY
02/15/2013; 8:00 pm, ESPN3		Niagara	L 54–57	7–19 (4–11)	McCann Arena (1,054); Poughkeepsie, NY
02/17/2013; 4:00 pm, ESPN3		at Rider	L 63–67	7–20 (4–12)	Alumni Gymnasium (1,617); Lawrenceville, NJ
02/23/2013*; 7:00 pm		VMI; BracketBusters	W 112–74	8–20	McCann Arena (1,254); Poughkeepsie, NY
03/01/2013; 7:00 pm		at Siena	W 76–74	9–20 (5–12)	Times Union Center (6,561); Albany, NY
03/03/2013; 2:00 pm, ESPN3		Fairfield	W 73–60	10–20 (6–12)	McCann Arena (1,680); Poughkeepsie, NY
2013 MAAC tournament
03/08/2013; 7:30 pm	(8)	vs. (9) Siena; First Round	L 64–70	10–21	MassMutual Center (2,038); Springfield, MA
*Non-conference game. ^{#}Rankings from AP Poll. (#) Tournament seedings in parentheses. All times are in Eastern Time.
