= 2012–13 Rider Broncs men's basketball team =

American college basketball season

2012–13 Rider Broncs men's basketball
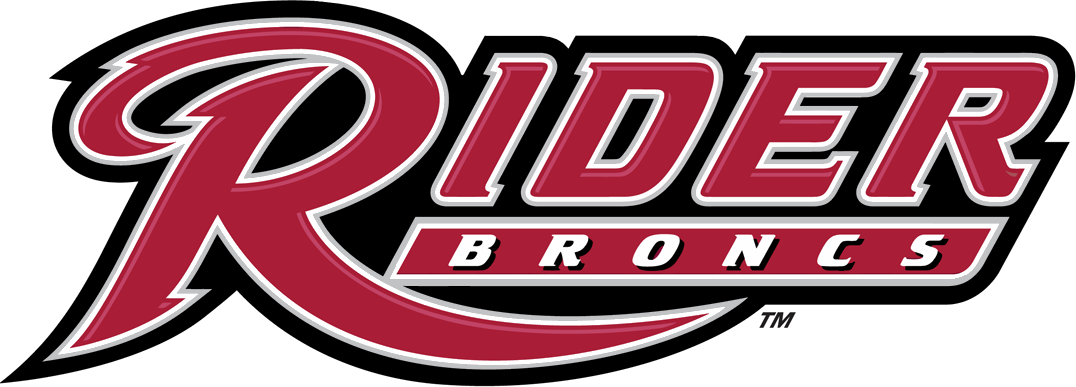

CIT, Second Round
- Conference: Metro Atlantic Athletic Conference
- Record: 19–15 (12–6 MAAC)
- Head coach: Kevin Baggett (1st season)
- Assistant coaches: Mike Witcoskie; Louis Rowe; Michael Cotton
- Home arena: Alumni Gymnasium

2012–13 MAAC men's basketball standings
	Conf.				Overall
Team	W		L	PCT	W		L	PCT
Niagara	13	–	5	.722	19	–	14	.576
Loyola (MD)	12	–	6	.667	23	–	12	.657
Rider	12	–	6	.667	19	–	15	.559
Canisius	11	–	7	.611	20	–	14	.588
Iona †	11	–	7	.611	20	–	14	.588
Fairfield	9	–	9	.500	19	–	16	.543
Manhattan	9	–	9	.500	14	–	18	.438
Marist	6	–	12	.333	10	–	21	.323
Siena	4	–	14	.222	8	–	24	.250
Saint Peter's	3	–	15	.167	9	–	21	.300
† 2013 MAAC tournament winner Rankings from AP Poll

The 2012–13 Rider Broncs men's basketball team represented Rider University during the 2012–13 NCAA Division I men's basketball season. The Broncs, led by first year head coach Kevin Baggett, played their home games at Alumni Gymnasium and were members of the Metro Atlantic Athletic Conference. They finished the season 19–15, 12–6 in MAAC play to finish in a tie for second place. They lost in the quarterfinals of the MAAC tournament to Fairfield. They were invited to the 2013 CIT where they defeated Hartford in the first round before losing in the second round to East Carolina.

== Roster ==
Number	Name	Position	Height	Weight	Year	Hometown
2	Zedric Sadler	Guard	6–2	195	Freshman	Detroit, Michigan
3	Jamal Nwaniemeka	Guard	6–2	180	Freshman	Philadelphia, Pennsylvania
5	Jonathon Thompson	Guard	6–4	190	Senior	Orlando, Florida
10	Anthony Myles	Guard	6–5	200	Junior	Dover, Delaware
11	Nurideen Lidsey	Guard	6–3	180	Junior	Philadelphia, Pennsylvania
12	Myles Melville	Guard	6–3	195	Freshman	Plano, Texas
13	Daniel Stewart	Forward	6–7	210	Junior	Philadelphia, Pennsylvania
14	Shawn Valentine	Forward	6–7	190	Freshman	Sicklerville, New Jersey
15	Khalil Alford	Guard	6–4	200	Freshman	Raleigh, North Carolina
20	Emerson Bursis	Forward	6–5	195	Sophomore	Scotrun, Pennsylvania
21	Dera Nd-Ezuma	Center	6–10	215	Senior	Nigeria
24	Derrick Stewart	Forward	6–6	205	Freshman	Philadelphia, Pennsylvania
25	Junior Fortunat	Forward/Center	6–9	235	Sophomore	Montreal, Quebec
33	Tommy Pereira	Guard	6–2	190	Junior	Nottingham, England

== Schedule ==
Date time, TV	Opponent	Result	Record	Site (attendance) city, state
Exhibition
11/03/2012*; 4:00 pm	Scranton	W 76–49		Alumni Gymnasium (1,231); Lawrenceville, NJ
Regular season
11/09/2012*; 7:00 pm	Robert Morris	W 79–54	1–0	Alumni Gymnasium (1,650); Lawrenceville, NJ
11/13/2012*; 6:00 am, ESPN	Stony Brook; ESPN Tip-Off Marathon	L 46–54	1–1	Alumni Gymnasium (1,650); Lawrenceville, NJ
11/17/2012*; 3:00 pm	Monmouth	W 65–62	2–1	Alumni Gymnasium (1,517); Lawrenceville, NJ
11/19/2012*; 7:00 pm	at South Carolina; Hoops For Hope Classic	L 76–88	2–2	Colonial Life Arena (7,157); Columbia, SC
11/21/2012*; 8:30 pm	at SMU; Hoops For Hope Classic	L 70–83	2–3	Moody Coliseum (2,901); University Park, TX
11/23/2012*; 4:30 pm	vs. Jacksonville; Hoops for Hope Challenge	W 86–71	3–3	(112); Puerto Vallarta, Mexico
11/25/2012*; 4:30 pm	vs. Milwaukee; Hoops for Hope Challenge	W 74–60	4–3	(126); Puerto Vallarta, Mexico
11/29/2012*; 7:00 pm	La Salle	L 52–63	4–4	Alumni Gymnasium (1,529); Lawrenceville, NJ
12/01/2012*; 12:00 pm	at Drexel	W 75–66	5–4	Daskalakis Athletic Center (1,871); Philadelphia, PA
12/07/2012; 7:00 pm	at Siena	W 62–56	6–4 (1–0)	Times Union Center (5,530); Albany, NY
12/09/2012; 2:00 pm	Fairfield	L 52–65	6–5 (1–1)	Alumni Gymnasium (1,559); Lawrenceville, NJ
12/20/2012*; 7:00 pm	at Princeton	L 45–62	6–6	Jadwin Gymnasium (1,570); Princeton, NJ
12/28/2012*; 3:00 pm	at Rutgers	L 56–68	6–7	The RAC (4,568); Piscataway, NJ
12/31/2012*; 2:00 pm	at Delaware	L 66–73	6–8	Bob Carpenter Center (2,209); Newark, DE
01/04/2013; 7:30 pm	at Loyola (MD)	L 65–71	6–9 (1–2)	Reitz Arena (702); Baltimore, MD
01/06/2013; 2:00 pm	Siena	W 72–53	7–9 (2–2)	Alumni Gymnasium (1,106); Lawrenceville, NJ
01/10/2013; 7:00 pm, ESPN3	at Manhattan	W 69–60	8–9 (3–2)	Draddy Gymnasium (1,387); Riverdale, NY
01/13/2013; 2:00 pm	Loyola (MD)	W 64–57	9–9 (4–2)	Alumni Gymnasium (1,513); Lawrenceville, NJ
01/17/2013; 8:30 pm, ESPN3	at Saint Peter's	W 66–54	10–9 (5–2)	Yanitelli Center (2,091); Jersey City, NJ
01/20/2013; 2:00 pm	Iona	W 67–62	11–9 (6–2)	Alumni Gymnasium (1,420); Lawrenceville, NJ
01/25/2013; 7:00 pm	Canisius	L 50–67	11–10 (6–3)	Alumni Gymnasium (1,025); Lawrenceville, NJ
01/27/2013; 4:00 pm	Manhattan	L 51–62	11–11 (6–4)	Alumni Gymnasium (1,590); Lawrenceville, NJ
02/01/2013; 7:00 pm	at Fairfield	L 59–69	11–12 (6–5)	Webster Bank Arena (2,820); Bridgeport, CT
02/03/2013; 2:00 pm	at Marist	W 64–58	12–12 (7–5)	McCann Field House (1,133); Poughkeepsie, NY
02/07/2013; 7:30 pm	Niagara	W 72–69	13–12 (8–5)	Alumni Gymnasium (1,603); Lawrenceville, NJ
02/09/2013; 7:00 pm, ESPN3	at Iona	L 71–78	13–13 (8–6)	Hynes Athletic Center (2,161); New Rochelle, NY
02/14/2013; 7:00 pm	Saint Peter's	W 72–57	14–13 (9–6)	Alumni Gymnasium (1,545); Lawrenceville, NJ
02/17/2013; 4:00 pm, ESPN3	Marist	W 67–63	15–13 (10–6)	Alumni Gymnasium (1,617); Lawrenceville, NJ
02/23/2013*; 5:00 pm	Charleston Southern; BracketBusters	W 61–54	16–13	Alumni Gymnasium (1,523); Lawrenceville, NJ
02/28/2013; 7:00 pm	at Niagara	W 68–59	17–13 (11–6)	Gallagher Center (1,948); Lewiston, NY
03/02/2013; 2:00 pm	at Canisius	W 65–61	18–13 (12–6)	Koessler Athletic Center (1,561); Buffalo, NY
2013 MAAC men's basketball tournament
03/09/2013; 7:30 pm, ESPN3	vs. Fairfield; Quarterfinals	L 42–43	18–14	MassMutual Center (N/A); Springfield, MA
2013 CIT
03/19/2013*; 7:00 pm	at Hartford; First Round	W 63–54	19–14	Chase Arena at Reich Family Pavilion (871); West Hartford, CT
03/23/2013*; 5:00 pm	at East Carolina; Second Round	L 54–75	19–15	Williams Arena (3,886); Greenville, NC
*Non-conference game. ^{#}Rankings from AP Poll. (#) Tournament seedings in parentheses. All times are in Eastern Time.
