= 2012–13 Siena Saints men's basketball team =

American college basketball season

2012–13 Siena Saints men's basketball
- Conference: Metro Atlantic Athletic Conference
- Record: 8–24 (4–14 MAAC)
- Head coach: Mitch Buonaguro (3rd season)
- Assistant coaches: Tobin Anderson; Craig Carter; Ben Davis
- Home arena: Times Union Center

2012–13 MAAC men's basketball standings
	Conf.				Overall
Team	W		L	PCT	W		L	PCT
Niagara	13	–	5	.722	19	–	14	.576
Loyola (MD)	12	–	6	.667	23	–	12	.657
Rider	12	–	6	.667	19	–	15	.559
Canisius	11	–	7	.611	20	–	14	.588
Iona †	11	–	7	.611	20	–	14	.588
Fairfield	9	–	9	.500	19	–	16	.543
Manhattan	9	–	9	.500	14	–	18	.438
Marist	6	–	12	.333	10	–	21	.323
Siena	4	–	14	.222	8	–	24	.250
Saint Peter's	3	–	15	.167	9	–	21	.300
† 2013 MAAC tournament winner Rankings from AP Poll

The 2012–13 Siena Saints men's basketball team represented Siena College during the 2012–13 NCAA Division I men's basketball season. The Saints, led by third year head coach Mitch Buonaguro, played their home games at the Times Union Center and were members of the Metro Atlantic Athletic Conference. They finished the season 8–24, 4–14 in MAAC play to finish in ninth place. They lost in the quarterfinals of the MAAC tournament to Niagara.

Following the season, head coach Mitch Buonaguro was fired after posting a record of 35–59 in three seasons.

== Roster ==
Number	Name	Position	Height	Weight	Year	Hometown
0	Rich Audu	Guard	6–3	194	Freshman	Mississauga, Ontario
1	O.D. Anosike	Forward	6–8	241	Senior	Staten Island, New York
2	Trenity Burdine	Forward	6–6	208	Sophomore	Reading, Pennsylvania
3	Ryan Oliver	Guard	6–3	186	Freshman	Inglewood, California
5	Evan Hymes	Guard	5–8	147	Sophomore	Durham, North Carolina
11	Steven Cruz	Guard	5–6	172	Junior	New York City, New York
12	Rakeem Brookins	Guard	5–10	156	Sophomore	Philadelphia, Pennsylvania
13	Lionel Gomis	Forward	6–8	215	Sophomore	Dakar, Senegal
15	Marcus Hopper	Forward	6–7	248	Sophomore	Queens, New York
20	Chris Leppanen	Guard	6–0	190	Freshman	Troy, New York
21	Davis Martens	Forward	6–9	222	Junior	Cologne, Germany
31	Brett Bisping	Forward	6–8	224	Freshman	Morton, Illinois
33	Rob Poole	Guard	6–5	186	Sophomore	Haddonfield, New Jersey
34	Imoh Silas	Center	6–8	218	Sophomore	Lagos, Nigeria

== Schedule ==
Date time, TV	Opponent	Result	Record	Site (attendance) city, state
Exhibition
11/03/2012*; 1:00PM	Skidmore	W 76–55		Alumni Recreation Center (1,020); Loudonville, NY
Regular season
11/09/2012*; 7:00PM, Time Warner	Vermont	L 53–54	0–1	Times Union Center (6,779); Albany, NY
11/11/2012*; 2:00 pm	at Navy	W 54–49 ^{OT}	1–1	Alumni Hall (584); Annapolis, MD
11/16/2012*; 7:00 pm	vs. Cal State Northridge; NUCDF Basketball Challenge	L 64–68	1–2	Jenny Craig Pavilion (1,442); San Diego, CA
11/17/2012*; 10:30 pm	vs. Northern Kentucky; NUCDF Basketball Challenge	W 56–52	2–2	Jenny Craig Pavilion (647); San Diego, CA
11/18/2012*; 4:00 pm	at San Diego; NUCDF Basketball Challenge	L 60–77	2–3	Jenny Craig Pavilion (1,114); San Diego, CA
11/25/2012*; 2:00 pm	at Maine	L 66–72	2–4	Alfond Arena (975); Orono, ME
11/28/2012*; 7:00 pm, Time Warner	Massachusetts	L 63–64	2–5	Times Union Center (5,739); Albany, NY
12/01/2012*; 7:00 pm, Time Warner	Albany	L 56–69	2–6	Times Union Center (10,229); Albany, NY
12/04/2012*; 9:00 pm, NBCSN	at St. Bonaventure	L 43–58	2–7	Reilly Center (3,482); St. Bonaventure, NY
12/07/2012; 7:00 pm, Time Warner	Rider	L 56–62	2–8 (0–1)	Times Union Center (5,530); Albany, NY
12/09/2012; 2:00 pm	at Manhattan	L 55–75	2–9 (0–2)	Draddy Gymnasium (1,509); Riverdale, NY
12/23/2012*; 12:00PM, Yes Network	at Fordham	L 75–81	2–10	Rose Hill Gymnasium (2,268); The Bronx, NY
12/29/2012*; 7:00 pm, Time Warner	La Salle	L 52–80	2–11	Times Union Center (5,907); Albany, NY
01/04/2013; 7:00 pm, ESPN3	Iona	L 62–66	2–12 (0–3)	Times Union Center (5,696); Albany, NY
01/06/2013; 2:00 pm	at Rider	L 53–72	2–13 (0–4)	Alumni Gymnasium (1,106); Lawrenceville, NJ
01/11/2013; 7:00 pm, Time Warner	Canisius	W 57–54	3–13 (1–4)	Times Union Center (5,986); Albany, NY
01/13/2013; 2:15 pm, Time Warner	Saint Peter's	W 66–53	4–13 (2–4)	Times Union Center (6,299); Albany, NY
01/17/2013; 7:00 pm, Time Warner	at Niagara	L 64–87	4–14 (2–5)	Gallagher Center (1,449); Lewiston, NY
01/19/2013; 2:00 pm	at Canisius	L 44–76	4–15 (2–6)	Koessler Athletic Center (2,001); Buffalo, NY
01/25/2013; 7:00 pm, Time Warner	Niagara	L 69–78	4–16 (2–7)	Times Union Center (6,387); Albany, NY
01/27/2013; 2:00 pm, Time Warner	at Marist	W 79–75	5–16 (3–7)	McCann Field House (1,747); Poughkeepsie, NY
02/01/2013; 7:00 pm, ESPNU	Manhattan	W 66–63	6–16 (4–7)	Times Union Center (6,098); Albany, NY
02/04/2013; 7:00 pm, Time Warner	Fairfield	L 54–64	6–17 (4–8)	Times Union Center (5,597); Albany, NY
02/08/2013; 9:00 pm, ESPNU	at Loyola (MD)	L 51–63	6–18 (4–9)	Reitz Arena (2,100); Baltimore, MD
02/10/2013; 2:00 pm	at Saint Peter's	L 62–72	6–19 (4–10)	Yanitelli Center (709); Jersey City, NJ
02/14/2013; 8:30 pm, ESPN3	at Fairfield	L 52–74	6–20 (4–11)	Webster Bank Arena (1,756); Bridgeport, CT
02/16/2013; 7:00 pm	Loyola (MD)	L 57–80	6–21 (4–12)	Times Union Center (6,477); Albany, NY
02/24/2013*; 12:00 pm	Radford; BracketBusters	W 65–57 ^{OT}	7–21	Times Union Center (5,768); Albany, NY
03/01/2013; 7:00pm	Marist	L 74–76	7–22 (4–13)	Times Union Center (6,561); Albany, NY
03/03/2013; 2:00 pm	at Iona	L 61–80	7–23 (4–14)	Hynes Athletic Center (2,525); New Rochelle, NY
2013 MAAC men's basketball tournament
03/08/2013; 7:30 pm	vs. Marist; First Round	W 70–64	8–23	MassMutual Center (2,038); Springfield, MA
03/09/2013; 2:30 pm, ESPN3	vs. Niagara; Quarterfinals	L 62–74	8–24	MassMutual Center (1,900); Springfield, MA
*Non-conference game. ^{#}Rankings from AP Poll. (#) Tournament seedings in parentheses. All times are in Eastern Time.
