= 2013 CollegeInsider.com Postseason Tournament =

Postseason college basketball tournament

- Teams: 32
- Finals site: Dee Events Center, Ogden, Utah
- Champions: East Carolina (1st title)
- Runner-up: Weber State (1st title game)
- Semifinalists: Evansville (1st semifinal); Northern Iowa (1st semifinal)
- Winning coach: Jeff Lebo (1st title)
- MVP: Maurice Kemp (East Carolina)

The 2013 CollegeInsider.com Postseason Tournament (CIT) was a postseason single-elimination tournament of 32 NCAA Division I teams. Games took place throughout March 2013. The semifinals were played on March 30, with the championship game played on April 2, 2013.

31 participants who were not invited to the 2013 NCAA tournament, the 2013 National Invitation Tournament, or the 2013 College Basketball Invitational made up the field, as well as the winner of the Great West conference tournament, Chicago State.

All games, except for the championship game, were streamed online through the CollegeInsider.com Game of the Week platform powered by NeuLion at watchcollegeinsider.com. Free registration was required to view the games. The championship game was broadcast by new partner CBS Sports Network.

The tournament was won by East Carolina, who defeated Weber State in the championship game.

== Participating teams ==
The following teams received an invitation to the 2013 CIT. The Great West Conference tournament champion, Chicago State, received an automatic bid.

School	Conference	Overall record	Conference record
Air Force	Mountain West	17–13	8–8
Boston University	America East	17–12	11–7
Bradley	Missouri Valley	16–16	7–11
Cal Poly	Big West	18–13	12–6
Canisius	Metro Atlantic Athletic	18–13	11–7
Chicago State	Great West	11–21	3–5
East Carolina	Conference USA	18–12	9–7
Eastern Kentucky	Ohio Valley	24–9	12–4
Elon	Southern	21–11	13–5
Evansville	Missouri Valley	18–14	10–4
Fairfield	Metro Atlantic Athletic	19–15	9–9
Gardner–Webb	Big South	21–12	11–5
Green Bay	Horizon League	18–15	10–6
Hartford	America East	17–13	10–6
Hawaiʻi	Big West	17–14	10–8
High Point	Big South	17–13	12–4
Kent State	Mid-American	20–13	9–7
Loyola (MD)	Metro Atlantic Athletic	21–11	12–6
North Dakota	Big Sky	16–16	12–8
Northern Iowa	Missouri Valley	21–11	12–6
Oakland	Summit	18–14	11–7
Oral Roberts	Southland	18–14	13–5
Rider	Metro Atlantic Athletic	18–14	12–6
Savannah State	Mid-Eastern Athletic	19–14	11–5
South Alabama	Sun Belt	17–12	14–6
Tennessee State	Ohio Valley	18–14	11–5
Texas–Arlington	Western Athletic	19–13	11–7
Tulane	Conference USA	19–14	6–10
UC Irvine	Big West	20–15	11–7
UIC	Horizon League	17–15	7–9
Weber State	Big Sky	26–6	18–2
Youngstown State	Horizon League	17–15	7–9

== Format ==
The fifth annual CIT will once again use the old NIT model, in which matchups in future rounds will be determined by the results of the previous round.

== Bracket ==
Bracket is for visual purposes only. The CIT does not have a set bracket.

First round March 19–20
Eastern Kentucky	69
Gardner–Webb	62
Tennessee State	72
Evansville	84
Elon	53
Canisius	69
Oakland	87
Youngstown State	99
Fairfield	71
Kent State	73
Boston University	63
Loyola (MD)	70
Rider	63
Hartford	54
Savannah State	65
East Carolina	66
High Point	71
UC Irvine	80
Oral Roberts	87
UT–Arlington	76
Air Force	69
Hawaiʻi	65
Cal Poly	43
Weber State	85
South Alabama	73
Tulane	84
Green Bay	69
Bradley	75
Chicago State	69
UIC	80
North Dakota	66
Northern Iowa	77

Second round March 23–25
Eastern Kentucky	72
Evansville	86
Canisius	84*
Youngstown State	82
Kent State	59
Loyola (MD)	73
Rider	54
East Carolina	75
UC Irvine	62
Oral Roberts	76
Air Force	57
Weber State	78
Tulane	72
Bradley	77
UIC	51
Northern Iowa	63

Quarterfinals; March 26–27
Evansville	84
Canisius	83
Loyola (MD)	58
East Carolina	70
Oral Roberts	74
Weber State	83
Bradley	77
Northern Iowa	90

Semifinals; March 30
Evansville	58
East Carolina	81
Weber State	59
Northern Iowa	56

Championship; April 2
East Carolina	77
Weber State	74

Home teams are listed second.
* Denotes overtime period.
