= 2012–13 America East Conference men's basketball season =

2012–13 American East Conference men's basketball season
- League: NCAA Division I
- Sport: Basketball
- Duration: November 2012 – March 2013
- Teams: 9

Regular Season
- Season champions: Stony Brook Seawolves
- Runners-up: Vermont Catamounts; Boston University Terriers
- Season MVP: Tommy Brenton (Stony Brook)
- Top scorer: Justin Edwards (Maine) 16.7

Tournament
- Champions: Albany Great Danes
- Runners-up: Vermont Catamounts
- Finals MVP: Mike Black (Albany)

America East Conference men's basketball seasons
- ← 2011–2012 2013–2014 →

2012–13 America East men's basketball standings
	Conf.				Overall
Team	W		L	PCT	W		L	PCT
Stony Brook	14	–	2	.875	25	–	8	.758
Vermont	11	–	5	.688	21	–	12	.636
Boston University*	11	–	5	.688	17	–	13	.567
Hartford	10	–	6	.625	17	–	14	.548
Albany †	9	–	7	.563	24	–	11	.686
Maine	6	–	10	.375	11	–	19	.367
New Hampshire	5	–	11	.313	9	–	20	.310
UMBC	5	–	11	.313	8	–	23	.258
Binghamton	1	–	15	.063	3	–	27	.100
† 2013 America East tournament winner As of March 22, 2013; Rankings from AP Poll; *Ineligible for conference tournament due to changing conferences in 2013

The 2012–13 America East men's basketball season began with practices in October 2012, followed by the start of the 2012–13 NCAA Division I men's basketball season in November.

Conference play began in early-January 2013, and concluded in March with the 2013 America East men's basketball tournament first two rounds being held at the University of Albany, and the final held at the University of Vermont.

== Preseason Poll ==
Rank	Team(First Place Votes)	Votes
1	Vermont(5)	60
2	Stony Brook(4)	58
3	Boston University	49
4	Albany	38
5	Maine	35
6	New Hampshire	34
7	Hartford	26
8	UMBC	15
9	Binghamton	9

Preseason Poll at AmericaEast.com

== Awards ==
=== Preseason All-Conference ===
First Team
*Mike Black (Albany)
D. J. Irving (Boston University)
Alasdair Fraser (Maine)
Chase Plummer (UMBC)
*Tommy Brenton (Stony Brook)
Brian Voelkel (Vermont)

Asterisk denotes unanimous selection

Preseason All-Conference at AmericaEast.com

=== All-Conference Teams ===
First Team
Mike Black (Albany)
*D. J. Irving (Boston University)
*Mark Nwakamma (Hartford)
*Tommy Brenton (Stony Brook)
Brian Voelkel (Vermont)

Second Team
Justin Edwards (Maine)
Alasdair Fraser (Maine)
Ryan Cook (UMBC)
Jameel Warney (Stony Brook)
Clancy Rugg (Vermont)

Third Team
Jordan Reed (Binghamton)
Dom Morris (Boston University)
Maurice Watson Jr. (Boston University)
Dave Coley (Stony Brook)
Sandro Carissimo (Vermont)

- denotes unanimous selection

=== All-Defensive Team ===
First Team
Mike Allison (Maine)
*Tommy Brenton (Stony Brook)
Dave Coley (Stony Brook)
Jameel Warney (Stony Brook)
*Brian Voelkel (Vermont)

- denotes unanimous selection

=== All-Freshmen Team ===
First Team
Peter Hooley (Albany)
*Jordan Reed (Binghamton)
*John Papale (Boston University)
*Maurice Watson Jr. (Boston University)
*Jameel Warney (Stony Brook)

- denotes unanimous selection

=== All-Academic Team ===
First Team
Jacob Iati (Albany)
Sam Rowley (Albany)
Scott Morris (New Hampshire)
Luke Apfeld (Vermont)
Sandro Carissimo (Vermont)

=== Player of the Year ===
Tommy Brenton of Stony Brook was awarded Player of the Year honors in the 2012–2013 season.

=== Coach of the Year ===
Steve Pikiell of Stony Brook was awarded Coach of the Year honors in the 2012–2013 season.

=== Defensive Player of the Year ===
Tommy Brenton of Stony Brook was awarded Defensive Player of the Year honors in the 2012–2013 season.

=== Freshmen of the Year ===
Jameel Warney of Stony Brook was awarded Freshmen of the year honors in the 2012–2013 season.
