= Albany Great Danes men's basketball statistical leaders =

The Albany Great Danes men's basketball statistical leaders are individual statistical leaders of the Albany Great Danes men's basketball program in various categories, including points, rebounds, assists, steals, and blocks. Within those areas, the lists identify single-game, single-season, and career leaders. The Great Danes represent University at Albany, SUNY in the NCAA's America East Conference.

Albany began competing in intercollegiate basketball in 1910. However, the school's record book does not generally list records from before the 1950s, as records from before this period are often incomplete and inconsistent. Since scoring was much lower in this era, and teams played much fewer games during a typical season, it is likely that few or no players from this era would appear on these lists anyway.

The NCAA did not officially record assists as a stat until the 1983–84 season, and blocks and steals until the 1985–86 season, but Albany's record books includes players in these stats before these seasons. These lists are updated through the end of the 2020–21 season.

== Scoring ==
Career
Rk	Player	Points	Seasons
1	Jamar Wilson	2164	2002–03 2003–04 2004–05 2005–06 2006–07
2	Gary Holway	1851	1955–56 1956–57 1957–58 1958–59
3	Jason Graber	1608	1990–91 1991–92 1992–93 1993–94
4	Tim Ambrose	1582	2007–08 2008–09 2009–10 2010–11
5	Mike Black	1542	2009–10 2010–11 2011–12 2012–13
6	Morrison Teague	1526	1985–86 1986–87 1987–88 1988–89
7	Peter Hooley	1519	2011–12 2012–13 2013–14 2014–15 2015–16
8	Joe Cremo	1469	2015–16 2016–17 2017–18
9	Don Cohen	1466	1957–58 1958–59 1959–60 1960–61
10	Andre Duncan	1453	1994–95 1995–96 1996–97 1997–98

Season
Rk	Player	Points	Season
1	Gerardo Suero	689	2011–12
2	Sebastian Thomas	627	2023–24
3	David Nichols	625	2016–17
4	Jamar Wilson	620	2006–07
5	Joe Cremo	571	2017–18
6	Jason Graber	568	1993–94
7	Jamar Wilson	567	2005–06
8	Morrison Teague	556	1988–89
9	Amir Lindsey	554	2025–26
10	Joe Cremo	553	2016–17

Single game
Rk	Player	Points	Season	Opponent
1	Sebastian Thomas	42	2023–24	UMass Lowell
2	Cameron Healy	41	2019–20	UMass Lowell
3	David Nichols	40	2016–17	Hartford
	Gary Holway	40	1956–57	Utica
5	Jamar Wilson	39	2002–03	New Hampshire
6	John Rockwood	38	1956–57	New Paltz
	Dan Zeh	38	1964–65	Marist
	Rich Margison	38	1967–68	R.I.T
9	Barry Cavanaugh	36	1975–76	Hamilton
	Barry Cavanaugh	36	1977–78	Hamilton
	E.J. Gallup	36	2001–02	Siena
	Tyler Bertram	36	2023–24	UMBC

== Rebounds ==
Career
Rk	Player	Rebounds	Seasons
1	Don Cohen	1317	1957–58 1958–59 1959–60 1960–61
2	Gary Holway	1225	1955–56 1956–57 1957–58 1958–59
3	Jim Oppedisano	920	1960–61 1961–62 1962–63
4	Adam Ursprung	913	1983–84 1984–85 1985–86 1986–87
5	Barry Cavanaugh	778	1975–76 1976–77 1977–78 1978–79
6	Sam Rowley	756	2011–12 2012–13 2013–14 2014–15
7	John Dieckelman	745	1980–81 1981–82 1982–83
8	Greig Stire	735	2014–15 2015–16 2016–17 2017–18
9	Morrison Teague	723	1985–86 1986–87 1987–88 1988–89
10	Scott Price	707	1966–67 1967–68 1968–69

Season
Rk	Player	Rebounds	Season
1	Don Cohen	462	1960–61
2	Don Cohen	419	1959–60
3	Gary Holway	339	1956–57
4	Jim Oppedisano	328	1960–61
5	Jim Oppedisano	326	1961–62
6	Gary Holway	316	1955–56
7	Gary Holway	289	1958–59
8	Don Cohen	283	1958–59
9	Gary Holway	281	1957–58
10	Adam Ursprung	278	1985–86

Single game
Rk	Player	Rebounds	Season	Opponent
1	Romani Hansen	18	2019–20	Hartford
2	Paul Newman	16	2021–22	UMass Lowell
	Jonathan Beagle	16	2023–24	NJIT
4	Jonathan Beagle	15	2023–24	Temple
	Jonathan Beagle	15	2022–23	UMBC
	Alex Foster	15	2017–18	Louisville
	Greig Stire	15	2016–17	Hartford
	Sam Rowley	15	2014–15	Binghamton
	Sam Rowley	15	2012–13	Maine
	Blake Metcalf	15	2011–12	Vermont
	Dave Schloss	15	1999–00	Texas A&M CC

== Assists ==
Career
Rk	Player	Assists	Seasons
1	Dan Croutier	644	1981–82 1982–83 1983–84 1984–85
2	Jamar Wilson	488	2002–03 2003–04 2004–05 2005–06 2006–07
3	Gary Trevett	406	1973–74 1974–75 1975–76 1976–77
4	Mike Cinque	389	1985–86 1986–87
5	Stephen Sauers	386	1986–87 1987–88 1988–89 1989–90
6	Mike Black	383	2009–10 2010–11 2011–12 2012–13
7	Todd Cetnar	367	1996–97 1997–98 1998–99 1999–00
8	Winston Royal	362	1975–76 1976–77 1977–78 1978–79 1979–80
9	Stephen Mulderry	325	1987–88 1988–89 1989–90
10	Garry Murray	312	1990–91 1991–92 1992–93 1993–94

Season
Rk	Player	Assists	Season
1	Mike Cinque	197	1985–86
2	Mike Cinque	192	1986–87
3	Dan Croutier	185	1984–85
4	Dan Croutier	178	1983–84
5	Stephen Mulderry	166	1989–90
6	Jamar Wilson	159	2006–07
	Stephen Sauers	159	1988–89
8	Sebastian Thomas	156	2023–24
9	Gary Trevett	152	1974–75
	Amir Lindsey	152	2025–26

Single game
Rk	Player	Assists	Season	Opponent
1	Sebastian Thomas	10	2023–24	Boston University
	Ahmad Clark	10	2018–19	Niagara
	Joe Cremo	10	2016–17	Hartford
	Evan Singletary	10	2015–16	Niagara
	Jamar Wilson	10	2006–07	Brown
	Jamar Wilson	10	2004–05	Siena
	Earv Opong	10	2002–03	Siena
8	Sebastian Thomas	9	2023–24	NJIT
	Sebastian Thomas	9	2023–24	Binghamton
	Sebastian Thomas	9	2023–24	UMBC
	Joe Cremo	9	2017–18	Binghamton
	Joe Cremo	9	2017–18	Kent State
	Mike Black	9	2011–12	Hartford
	Mike Black	9	2011–12	Monmouth
	Mike Black	9	2009–10	Stony Brook

== Steals ==
Career
Rk	Player	Steals	Seasons
1	Garry Murray	207	1990–91 1991–92 1992–93 1993–94
2	Todd Cetnar	188	1996–97 1997–98 1998–99 1999–00
3	Dan Croutier	181	1981–82 1982–83 1983–84 1984–85
4	Jason Graber	179	1990–91 1991–92 1992–93 1993–94
5	Brian Lillis	169	2004–05 2005–06 2006–07 2007–08
6	Mike Cinque	149	1985–86 1986–87
7	Jamar Wilson	140	2002–03 2003–04 2004–05 2005–06 2006–07
8	Levi Levine	138	2002–03 2003–04 2004–05 2005–06
9	Bob Markel	133	1994–95 1995–96 1996–97 1997–98 1998–99
10	Sam Rowley	129	2011–12 2012–13 2013–14 2014–15

Season
Rk	Player	Steals	Season
1	Garry Murray	81	1993–94
2	Mike Cinque	75	1986–87
3	Mike Cinque	74	1985–86
4	Stephen Mulderry	70	1989–90
5	Garry Murray	65	1992–93
6	Ahmad Clark	63	2018–19
7	Sebastian Thomas	62	2023–24
8	Jason Graber	60	1991–92
9	Amar'e Marshall	59	2023–24
	Bob Markel	59	1994–95
	Jason Graber	59	1992–93
	Todd Cetnar	59	1999–00

Single game
Rk	Player	Steals	Season	Opponent
1	Sam Hopes	7	2000–01	Harvard
2	Sebastian Thomas	6	2023–24	New Hampshire
	DJ Evans	6	2013–14	Siena
	Tim Ambrose	6	2009–10	Iona
	Brian Lillis	6	2006–07	UMBC
	Brian Lillis	6	2005–06	New Hampshire
	Brian Lillis	6	2005–06	Vermont
	Brian Lillis	6	2004–05	Northeastern
	Levi Levine	6	2004–05	Syracuse
	Levi Levine	6	2002–03	Northeastern
	Antione Johnson	6	2002–03	Maine
	Sam Hopes	6	2000–01	Stony Brook

== Blocks ==
Career
Rk	Player	Blocks	Seasons
1	Andre Duncan	184	1994–95 1995–96 1996–97 1997–98
2	John Dieckelman	155	1980–81 1981–82 1982–83
3	Adam Ursprung	148	1983–84 1984–85 1985–86 1986–87
4	Michael Shene	146	1987–88 1988–89 1989–90 1990–91
5	John Puk	112	2010–11 2011–12 2012–13 2013–14
6	Dave Schloss	110	1998–99 1999–00 2000–01
7	Will Brand	79	1998–99 1999–00 2000–01 2001–02
8	Brett Gifford	75	2006–07 2007–08 2008–09 2009–10
9	Blake Metcalf	73	2009–10 2010–11 2011–12 2012–13
10	Jason Graber	68	1990–91 1991–92 1992–93 1993–94

Season
Rk	Player	Blocks	Season
1	John Dieckelman	74	1981–82
2	Michael Shene	72	1989–90
3	Dave Schloss	68	1998–99
4	Okechukwu Okeke	66	2025–26
5	Andre Duncan	57	1997–98
6	Andre Duncan	51	1994–95
	Charles Paul	51	1995–96
8	Adam Ursprung	50	1985–86
9	Michael Shene	49	1990–91
10	Adam Ursprung	46	1986–87

Single game
Rk	Player	Steals	Season	Opponent
1	Okechukwu Okeke	8	2025–26	UMass Lowell
2	Okechukwu Okeke	7	2025–26	Stony Brook
3	Dave Schloss	6	1999–00	Yale
4	Okechukwu Okeke	5	2025–26	Bryant
	Okechukwu Okeke	5	2025–26	Cornell
	Malachi de Sousa	5	2018–19	Binghamton
	John Puk	5	2013–14	UMBC
8	Okechukwu Okeke	4	2025–26	UMass Lowell
	Kacper Klaczek	4	2024–25	Bryant
	DeMarr Langford Jr	4	2024–25	Binghamton
	Kacper Klaczek	4	2024–25	Binghamton
	Paul Newman	4	2021–22	UMass Lowell
	Romani Hansen	4	2019–20	SUNY Potsdam
	Alex Foster	4	2017–18	Binghamton
	John Puk	4	2013–14	UMBC
	John Puk	4	2010–11	Binghamton
	John Puk	4	2010–11	Central Conn. St.
	Brett Gifford	4	2009–10	Stony Brook
	John Puk	4	2010–11	Detroit
	Scotty McRae	4	2009–10	Boston U.
	Brett Gifford	4	2009–10	Morgan State
	Brett Gifford	4	2008–09	Canisius
	Brian Lillis	4	2006–07	Harvard
	Kirsten Zoellner	4	2005–06	Sacred Heart
	Chriss Wyatt	4	2003–04	Hartford
	Aquawasi St. Hillaire	4	2003–04	Stony Brook
	Levi Levine	4	2002–03	Colgate
	Will Brand	4	2001–02	Boston U.
	Will Brand	4	2001–02	Northeastern
