= 2006 America East men's basketball tournament =

- Classification: Division I
- Season: 2005–06
- First round site: Binghamton University Events Center; Vestal, New York
- Quarterfinals site: Binghamton University Events Center; Vestal, New York
- Semifinals site: Binghamton University Events Center; Vestal, New York
- Finals site: SEFCU Arena; Albany, New York
- Champions: Albany (1st title)
- Winning coach: Will Brown (1st title)
- MVP: Jamar Wilson (Albany)

2005–06 America East men's basketball standings
	Conf.				Overall
Team	W		L	PCT	W		L	PCT
Albany †	13	–	3	.813	21	–	11	.656
Binghamton	12	–	4	.750	16	–	13	.552
Boston University	9	–	7	.563	12	–	16	.429
Hartford	9	–	7	.563	13	–	15	.464
New Hampshire	8	–	8	.500	12	–	17	.414
Vermont	7	–	9	.438	13	–	17	.433
Maine	7	–	9	.438	12	–	16	.429
UMBC	5	–	11	.313	10	–	19	.345
Stony Brook	2	–	14	.125	4	–	24	.143
† 2006 America East tournament winner As of March 14, 2006; Rankings from AP Poll

The 2006 America East men's basketball tournament was held from March 3–5 at the Binghamton University Events Center. The final was held March 11 at the Recreation and Convocation Center at the University at Albany. Albany gained its first ever berth in the NCAA tournament with its 80-67 win over Vermont. Albany was given the 16th seed in the Washington D.C. Regional of the NCAA Tournament and lost in the first round to Connecticut 72–59, after Albany nearly became the first 16 seed to upset a 1 seed with a twelve-point lead with just over eleven minutes to play.

== Bracket and Results ==
First round Friday, March 3
8	UMBC	88
9	Stony Brook	70

Quarterfinals; Saturday, March 4
1	Albany	79
8	UMBC	65
4	Hartford	62
5	New Hampshire	66
2	Binghamton	71
7	Maine	62
3	Boston University	61
6	Vermont	64

Semifinals; Sunday, March 5
1	Albany	67
5	New Hampshire	54
2	Binghamton	59
6	Vermont	66

Final; Saturday, March 11
1	Albany	80
6	Vermont	67

== See also ==
- America East Conference
