= 2006–07 Albany Great Danes men's basketball team =

American college basketball season

2006–07 Albany Great Danes men's basketball

America East tournament champion

NCAA tournament, Round of 64
- Conference: America East Conference
- Record: 23–10 (13–3 AE)
- Head coach: Will Brown (6th season)
- Home arena: SEFCU Arena

2006–07 America East men's basketball standings
	Conf.				Overall
Team	W		L	PCT	W		L	PCT
Vermont	15	–	1	.938	25	–	8	.758
Albany †	13	–	3	.813	23	–	10	.697
Boston University	8	–	8	.500	12	–	18	.400
Maine	7	–	9	.438	12	–	18	.400
UMBC	7	–	9	.438	12	–	19	.387
Binghamton	6	–	10	.375	13	–	16	.448
New Hampshire	6	–	10	.375	10	–	20	.333
Hartford	6	–	10	.375	13	–	18	.419
Stony Brook	4	–	12	.250	9	–	20	.310
† America East tournament winner As of March 13, 2007; Rankings from AP Poll

The 2006–07 Albany Great Danes men's basketball team represented the University at Albany, SUNY in the 2006–07 NCAA Division I men's basketball season. The Great Danes, led by head coach Will Brown, played their home games at the SEFCU Arena in Albany, New York, as members of the America East Conference. After finishing 2nd in the conference regular season standings, the Great Danes won the America East tournament to earn an automatic bid to the NCAA tournament as the 13th seed in the South region. Albany was beaten by 4th seed Virginia in the first round, 84–57.

== Roster ==
2006–07 Albany Great Danes men's basketball team
Players
Coaches

Pos.	#	Name	Height	Weight	Year	Hometown
G	00	Carl Ross	6 ft 4 in (1.93 m)	—	Jr	Fresno, California
G/F	1	Jason Siggers	6 ft 4 in (1.93 m)	—	Sr	Dallas, Texas
G	2	Michael Knight	6 ft 3 in (1.91 m)	—	Jr	Seattle, Washington
G	3	David Bauman	6 ft 2 in (1.88 m)	—	Jr	Sarver, Pennsylvania
F	4	Mike Yocum	6 ft 9 in (2.06 m)	—	Fr	Dresher, Pennsylvania
G/F	11	Reid Anderson	6 ft 5 in (1.96 m)	—	Fr	Avon Lake, Ohio
G	14	Jon Iati	5 ft 9 in (1.75 m)	—	Jr	York, Pennsylvania
G/F	21	Brian Lillis (C)	6 ft 5 in (1.96 m)	—	Jr	Urbandale, Iowa
G	31	Jamar Wilson (C)	6 ft 1 in (1.85 m)	—	Sr	Bronx, New York
F	33	Brian Connelly	6 ft 8 in (2.03 m)	—	So	Audubon, New Jersey
F	34	Brent Wilson (C)	6 ft 8 in (2.03 m)	—	Jr	Cedar Rapids, Iowa
F/C	42	Jimmie Covington	6 ft 7 in (2.01 m)	—	So	Chicago, Illinois
C	54	Brett Gifford	6 ft 11 in (2.11 m)	—	Fr	Columbia, Missouri

Head coach

- Will Brown (Dowling)

Assistant coach(es)

Legend

- (C) Team captain
- (S) Suspended
- (I) Ineligible
- (W) Walk-on
- Injured
- Current redshirt

Roster
Last update: April 29, 2022

== Schedule and results ==
Date time, TV	Rank^{#}	Opponent^{#}	Result	Record	Site city, state
Regular season
November 11, 2006*		Bucknell	W 55–49	1–0	SEFCU Arena (4,538); Albany, NY
November 17, 2008*		Delaware	W 87–67	2–0	SEFCU Arena (3,883); Albany, NY
November 21, 2006*		at Sacred Heart	L 71–90	2–1	William H. Pitt Center (516); Fairfield, CT
November 26, 2006*		at No. 18 Connecticut	L 55–86	2–2	Gampel Pavilion (10,167); Storrs, CT
December 2, 2006*		at Siena; Siena-Albany rivalry	L 75–76 ^{2OT}	2–3	Pepsi Arena (11,271); Albany, NY
December 6, 2006*		VCU	L 57–75	2–4	SEFCU Arena (2,009); Albany, NY
December 9, 2006*		Brown	W 62–52	3–4	SEFCU Arena (1,887); Albany, NY
December 12, 2006*		at Harvard	W 79–76	4–4	Lavietes Pavilion (312); Cambridge, MA
December 16, 2006*		St. Bonaventure	W 71–56	5–4	SEFCU Arena (2,913); Albany, NY
December 22, 2006*		at Cornell	W 78–75	6–4	Newman Arena (653); Ithaca, NY
December 28, 2006*		at Utah	W 60–59	7–4	Jon M. Huntsman Center (9,483); Salt Lake City, UT
December 30, 2006*		at Utah Valley State	L 66–73	7–5	McKay Events Center (1,013); Orem, UT
January 3, 2007		New Hampshire	W 69–52	8–5 (1–0)	SEFCU Arena (3,122); Albany, NY
January 6, 2007		at Binghamton	L 72–83	8–6 (1–1)	Binghamton University Events Center (3,458); Vestal, NY
January 9, 2007		at UMBC	W 65–61	9–6 (2–1)	Retriever Activities Center (1,410); Baltimore, MD
January 11, 2007		Maine	W 82–73	10–6 (3–1)	SEFCU Arena (2,472); Albany, NY
January 13, 2007		at Vermont	L 66–75	10–7 (3–2)	Patrick Gym (3,266); Burlington, VT
January 15, 2007		Stony Brook	W 66–61	11–7 (4–2)	SEFCU Arena (2,012); Albany, NY
January 21, 2007		Hartford	W 80–67	12–7 (5–2)	SEFCU Arena (3,127); Albany, NY
January 24, 2007		at Boston University	W 52–50	13–7 (6–2)	Case Gym (813); Boston, MA
January 28, 2007		at New Hampshire	W 71–64	14–7 (7–2)	Lundholm Gym (1,372); Durham, NH
January 31, 2007		UMBC	W 82–58	15–7 (8–2)	SEFCU Arena (3,211); Albany, NY
February 3, 2007		Binghamton	W 65–62	16–7 (9–2)	SEFCU Arena (4,538); Albany, NY
February 5, 2007		at Hartford	L 63–64	17–7 (10–2)	Chase Arena at Reich Family Pavilion (854); Hartford
February 7, 2007		at Maine	W 71–55	18–7 (11–2)	Alfond Arena (1,370); Orono, ME
February 11, 2007		Vermont	L 63–67	18–8 (11–3)	SEFCU Arena (4,538); Albany, NY
February 16, 2007*		at Boise State; ESPN BracketBusters	L 82–83	18–9	Taco Bell Arena (4,300); Boise, ID
February 22, 2007		at Stony Brook	W 66–46	19–9 (12–3)	SBU Arena (1,706); Stony Brook, NY
February 25, 2007		Boston University	W 73–63	20–9 (13–3)	SEFCU Arena (3,026); Albany, NY
America East tournament
March 3, 2007	(2)	vs. (7) New Hampshire; America East Quarterfinals	W 64–47	21–9	Agganis Arena (3,146); Boston, MA
March 4, 2007	(2)	vs. (3) Boston University; America East Semifinals	W 59–49	22–9	Agganis Arena (3,436); Boston, MA
March 10, 2007	(2)	at (1) Vermont; America East Championship	W 60–59	23–9	Patrick Gym (3,266); Burlington, VT
NCAA tournament
March 16, 2007	(13 S)	vs. (4 S) No. 4 Virginia; NCAA First Round	L 57–84	23–10	Nationwide Arena; Columbus, OH
*Non-conference game. ^{#}Rankings from AP Poll. (#) Tournament seedings in parentheses.
