= 2007 America East men's basketball tournament =

- Classification: Division I
- Season: 2006–07
- Teams: 9
- Champions: Albany (2nd title)
- Winning coach: Will Brown (2nd title)
- MVP: Jamar Wilson (Albany)

2006–07 America East men's basketball standings
	Conf.				Overall
Team	W		L	PCT	W		L	PCT
Vermont	15	–	1	.938	25	–	8	.758
Albany †	13	–	3	.813	23	–	10	.697
Boston University	8	–	8	.500	12	–	18	.400
Maine	7	–	9	.438	12	–	18	.400
UMBC	7	–	9	.438	12	–	19	.387
Binghamton	6	–	10	.375	13	–	16	.448
New Hampshire	6	–	10	.375	10	–	20	.333
Hartford	6	–	10	.375	13	–	18	.419
Stony Brook	4	–	12	.250	9	–	20	.310
† America East tournament winner As of March 13, 2007; Rankings from AP Poll

The 2007 America East men's basketball tournament was held from March 2–4 at Agganis Arena. The final was held March 10 at Patrick Gym. The Albany Great Danes won the tournament to advance to their second consecutive berth in the NCAA tournament. Albany was given the 13th seed in the South Regional of the NCAA Tournament and lost in the first round to Virginia 84–57. Vermont gained a bid to the NIT and lost in the first round to Kansas State 59–57.

== Bracket and Results ==
First round Friday, March 2
8	Hartford	49
9	Stony Brook	47

Quarterfinals; Saturday, March 3
1	Vermont	81
8	Hartford	62
4	Maine	61
5	UMBC	70
2	Albany	64
7	New Hampshire	47
3	Boston University	62
6	Binghamton	58

Semifinals; Sunday, March 4
1	Vermont	72
5	UMBC	63
2	Albany	59
3	Boston University	49

Final; Saturday, March 10
1	Vermont	59
2	Albany	60

== See also ==
- America East Conference
