= Will Brown (basketball) =

American basketball coach

Personal information
- Born: October 8, 1971 (age 55) Miller Place, New York, U.S.

Career history

Coaching
- 1995–1998: Saint Rose (assistant)
- 1998–2001: Sullivan County CC
- 2001: Albany (assistant)
- 2001–2002: Albany (interim)
- 2002–2021: Albany
- 2021–2022: Albany Patroons
- 2023–2024: Saint Rose (women's)
- 2024-: MCLA (women's)

Career highlights
- 2× America East regular season champion (2006, 2015); 5× America East tournament champion (2006, 2007, 2013–2015); America East Coach of the Year (2015)

William J. Brown (born October 8, 1971) is an American basketball coach. He is the former head men's basketball coach at the University at Albany, where he served from 2002 to 2021 and guided the Great Danes to five NCAA tournament appearances. Brown has also coached the Albany Patroons of The Basketball League and the women's basketball team at the College of Saint Rose.

== Playing career ==
Born in Miller Place, New York, Brown played collegiate basketball at Dowling College, starting for three years. He finished his career as the school's all-time leader in assists, three-point field goals and free-throw percentage, and is the only player in Dowling history to score 1,000 points and tally 500 assists.

== Coaching career ==
Brown began his coaching career at The College of Saint Rose, serving as an assistant coach for three seasons. He then became the head coach at Sullivan County Community College, compiling a record of 90–10 in three seasons. Brown joined the coaching staff at the University at Albany as an assistant coach for the 2001–02 season, and was named interim head coach on December 20, 2001 after head coach Scott Beeten was fired. On March 13, 2002, UAlbany removed the "interim" tag from Brown's title and officially named him as its 15th head coach.

In the 2005-2006 season, Brown led the Great Danes to their first-ever America East conference regular season and tournament championship, as well as its first Division I NCAA Tournament appearance. With the help of two-time America East Player of the Year Jamar Wilson, the team won the America East conference tournament title in 2007 and returned to the NCAA tournament in 2007.

From the 2012–13 season to the 2014–15 season, Brown guided Albany to three straight America East titles and NCAA appearances, adding his second conference regular season title in the process. His fifth conference tournament title tied Jim Calhoun for the highest total in America East history. In 2019, Brown earned his 300th career victory as the coach of the Great Danes when the team defeated Niagara.

On March 1, 2021, Brown and Albany agreed to mutually part ways at the expiration of his contract. Brown's career record at the University at Albany was 315–295.

On October 27, 2021, the Albany Patroons of The Basketball League announced that the team had hired Brown as its head coach and general manager for the 2022 season. In his only season with the Patroons, Brown guided the team to a 29–4 record and was named the TBL National Coach of the Year. Brown led the Patroons to The Basketball League Northeast Division Championship, Easter Regional Championship and the Eastern Conference Championship before stepping down from the position on December 17, 2022.

Brown was named the head coach of the women's basketball team at Division II Saint Rose on June 23, 2023. He took over a team that had won 11 games the year prior and guided them to a 21–7 mark and a third-place finish in the Northeast-10 Conference and guiding the team to the 2024 NCAA Division II tournament for the first time since the 2010–11 season, and in the final year of the school's existence, as it was announced Saint Rose would close at the end of the 2023–24 academic year.

== Head coaching record ==
=== Junior college ===
Record table
Season	Team	Overall	Conference	Standing	Postseason
Sullivan County CC Generals (Mid Hudson Conference) (1998–2001)
1998–99	Sullivan County CC	30–2			NJCAA Final Four
1999–00	Sullivan County CC	28–5			Region XV Runner-up
2000–01	Sullivan County CC	32–3			NJCAA Championship Runner-up
Sullivan County CC:		90–10 (.900)			
Total:		90–10 (.900)			
National champion Postseason invitational champion Conference regular season champion Conference regular season and conference tournament champion Division regular season champion Division regular season and conference tournament champion Conference tournament champion

=== NCAA ===
==== Men's ====
Record table
Season	Team	Overall	Conference	Standing	Postseason
Albany Great Danes (America East Conference) (2001–2021)
2001–02	Albany	7–13^{‡}	5–11	T–9th	
2002–03	Albany	7–21	3–13	T–9th	
2003–04	Albany	5–23	3–13	10th	
2004–05	Albany	13–15	9–9	4th	
2005–06	Albany	21–11	13–3	1st	NCAA Division I Round of 64
2006–07	Albany	23–9	13–3	2nd	NCAA Division I Round of 64
2007–08	Albany	15–15	10–6	3rd	
2008–09	Albany	15–16	6–10	7th	
2009–10	Albany	7–25	2–14	9th	
2010–11	Albany	16–16	9–7	4th	
2011–12	Albany	19–15	9–7	4th	CIT first round
2012–13	Albany	24–11	9–7	5th	NCAA Division I Round of 64
2013–14	Albany	19–15	9–7	4th	NCAA Division I Round of 64
2014–15	Albany	24–9	15–1	1st	NCAA Division I Round of 64
2015–16	Albany	24–9	13–3	2nd	CBI first round
2016–17	Albany	21–14	10–6	T–3rd	CIT first round
2017–18	Albany	22–10	10–6	4th	CIT/CBI INVITATION
2018–19	Albany	12–20	7–9	6th	
2019–20	Albany	14–18	7–9	7th	
2020–21	Albany	7–9 (COVID SEASON)	6–6	5th	
Albany:		315–295 (.516)	165–147 (.529)	‡ Beeten fired 12/20/01; Brown coached rest of season.	
Total:		315–295 (.516)			
National champion Postseason invitational champion Conference regular season champion Conference regular season and conference tournament champion Division regular season champion Division regular season and conference tournament champion Conference tournament champion

==== Women's ====
Record table
Season	Team	Overall	Conference	Standing	Postseason
Saint Rose Golden Knights (Northeast-10 Conference) (2023–2024)
2023–24	Saint Rose	21–7	17–5	3rd	NCAA Division II First Round
Saint Rose Golden Knights:		21–7 (.750)	17–5 (.773)		
2024–25	MCLA	0–0	0–0		
MCLA:		0–0 (–)	0–0 (–)		
Total:		21–7 (.750)			
National champion Postseason invitational champion Conference regular season champion Conference regular season and conference tournament champion Division regular season champion Division regular season and conference tournament champion Conference tournament champion
