= Albany–Siena rivalry =

American college basketball rivalry

Albany—Siena rivalry
- Albany Great Danes Siena Saints
- Sport: Basketball
- First meeting: January 5, 1940
- Latest meeting: November 21, 2025; Siena, 73–63
- Next meeting: TBD
- Trophy: Albany Cup

Statistics
- Total meetings: 62
- All-time series: Siena leads 36–26
- Largest victory: Albany, 86–51 (2023)
- Longest win streak: Siena, 5 (2005–2009)

Locations of Albany and Siena in New York

The Albany–Siena rivalry, also known as the Albany Cup, is a college basketball rivalry between the Siena Saints and the Albany Great Danes. With the two campuses separated by 8 miles (13 km), it is one of the geographically closest rivalries in NCAA Division I. While the first meeting between the two schools occurred in 1940, the game between the two schools became a yearly event starting in 2001 with both teams in Division I.

Until the 2016 game, which was played at UAlbany's SEFCU Arena, all games between the two rival schools had been contested at the MVP Arena (formerly the Times Union Center until 2021), which is normally Siena's home arena. This caused a brief war of words between the coaches of both teams (Jimmy Patsos of Siena and Will Brown of Albany) in the run-up to that contest.

== All-time results (since 2001) ==
Albany victories	Siena victories

No.	Date	Location	Winner	Score
1	November 27, 2001	Pepsi Arena	Siena	60–48
2	November 22, 2002	Pepsi Arena	Siena	79–75
3	November 21, 2003	Pepsi Arena	Siena	71–50
4	November 23, 2004	Pepsi Arena	Albany	86–65
5	December 3, 2005	Pepsi Arena	Siena	82–74^{OT}
6	December 2, 2006	Pepsi Arena	Siena	76–75^{2OT}
7	December 1, 2007	Times Union Center	Siena	75–71
8	December 6, 2008	Times Union Center	Siena	71–64
9	December 5, 2009	Times Union Center	Siena	83–54
10	December 4, 2010	Times Union Center	Albany	88–82^{OT}
11	December 3, 2011	Times Union Center	Siena	64–60
12	December 1, 2012	Times Union Center	Albany	69–56
13	November 8, 2013	Times Union Center	Albany	74–62
14	December 13, 2014	Times Union Center	Albany	77–68
15	December 12, 2015	Times Union Center	Siena	78–70
16	November 27, 2016	SEFCU Arena	Albany	81–72
17	December 9, 2017	Times Union Center	Albany	74–69
18	November 12, 2022	MVP Arena	Siena	75–62
19	November 26, 2023	MVP Arena	Albany	86–51
20	November 16, 2024	Broadview Center	Albany	70–60
21	November 21, 2025	MVP Arena	Siena	73–63
Series: Siena leads 12–9
