= 2006–07 UMBC Retrievers men's basketball team =

American college basketball season

2006–07 UMBC Retrievers men's basketball
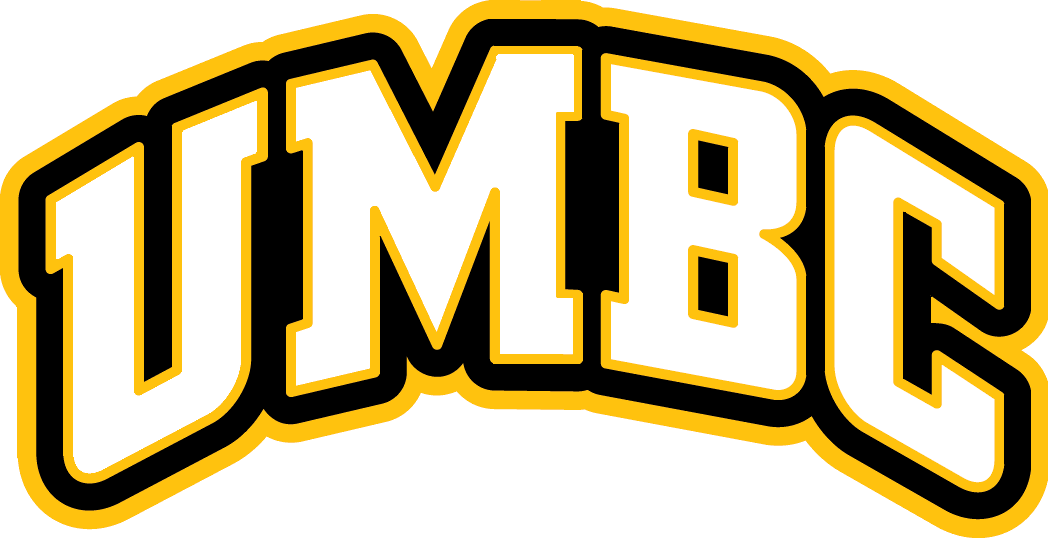
- Conference: America East Conference
- Record: 12–19 (7–9 AEC)
- Head coach: Randy Monroe (3rd season)
- Home arena: Retriever Activities Center

2006–07 America East men's basketball standings
| | Conf. | | | | Overall |
| Team | W | | L | PCT | W | | L | PCT |
|---|---|---|---|---|---|---|---|---|
| Vermont | 15 | – | 1 | .938 | 25 | – | 8 | .758 |
| Albany † | 13 | – | 3 | .813 | 23 | – | 10 | .697 |
| Boston University | 8 | – | 8 | .500 | 12 | – | 18 | .400 |
| Maine | 7 | – | 9 | .438 | 12 | – | 18 | .400 |
| UMBC | 7 | – | 9 | .438 | 12 | – | 19 | .387 |
| Binghamton | 6 | – | 10 | .375 | 13 | – | 16 | .448 |
| New Hampshire | 6 | – | 10 | .375 | 10 | – | 20 | .333 |
| Hartford | 6 | – | 10 | .375 | 13 | – | 18 | .419 |
| Stony Brook | 4 | – | 12 | .250 | 9 | – | 20 | .310 |
† America East tournament winner As of March 13, 2007; Rankings from AP Poll

The 2006–07 UMBC Retrievers men's basketball team represented University of Maryland, Baltimore County in the 2006–07 NCAA Division I men's basketball season. The team played in the America East Conference (AEC) and was led by head coach Randy Monroe, in his third year.

== Schedule and results ==
| Date time, TV | Rank^{#} | Opponent^{#} | Result | Record | Site (attendance) city, state |
Non-conference regular season
| November 11, 2006* | | at St. Peter's | L 56–67 | 0–1 | Yanitelli Center (1,137); Jersey City, New Jersey |
| November 14, 2006* | | Loyola | L 56–69 | 0–2 | Retriever Activities Center (3,052); Catonsville, MD |
| November 18, 2006* | | at Hampton | W 56–49 | 1–2 | Hampton Convocation Center (1,219); Hampton, VA |
| November 21, 2006* | | Lafayette | W 86–51 | 2–2 | Retriever Activities Center (2,213); Catonsville, MD |
| November 25, 2006* | | at Michigan | L 54–66 | 2–3 | Crisler Center (9,078); Ann Arbor, MI |
| November 27, 2006* | | at Morgan State | W 86–72 | 3–3 | Talmadge L. Hill Field House (967); Baltimore, MD |
| December 1, 2006*; 7:30 p.m. | | at St. John's | L 57–78 | 3–4 | Carnesecca Arena (3,994); Queens, NY |
| December 3, 2006* | | Long Beach State | L 53–57 | 3–5 | Retriever Activities Center (1,922); Catonsville, MD |
| December 7, 2006*; 7:00 p.m. | | at La Salle | W 78–67 | 4–5 | Tom Gola Arena (2,622); Philadelphia, PA |
| December 12, 2006* | | at George Washington | L 51–72 | 4–6 | Charles E. Smith Center (2,563); Washington, D.C. |
| December 16, 2006* | | at No. 20 Marquette | L 46–68 | 4–7 | Bradley Center (12,876); Milwaukee, Wisconsin |
| December 22, 2006* | | at William & Mary | L 58–70 | 4–8 | Kaplan Arena (1,421); Williamsburg, VA |
| December 30, 2006*; 4:00 p.m. | | Central Connecticut | L 52–66 | 4–9 | Retriever Activities Center (1,422); Catonsville, MD |
America East regular season
| January 3, 2007 | | at Binghamton | W 73–71 | 5–9 (1–0) | Binghamton University Events Center (2,822); Vestal, NY |
| January 6, 2007 | | at Stony Brook | W 72–53 | 6–9 (2–0) | Stony Brook University Arena (1,347); Stony Brook, NY |
| January 9, 2007 | | Albany | L 61–65 | 6–10 (2–1) | Retriever Activities Center (1,410); Catonsville, MD |
| January 11, 2007 | | Vermont | W 83–63 | 7–10 (3–1) | Retriever Activities Center (1,320); Catonsville, MD |
| January 16, 2007 | | at Maine | L 56–70 | 7–11 (3–2) | Alfond Arena (1,374); Orono, ME |
| January 18, 2007; 7:00 p.m. | | Hartford | W 73–68 | 8–11 (4–2) | Retriever Activities Center (1,522); Catonsville, MD |
| January 21, 2007 | | at Boston University | L 53–59 | 8–12 (4–3) | Case Gym (524); Boston, MA |
| January 25, 2007 | | New Hampshire | W 45–44 | 9–12 (5–3) | Retriever Activities Center (1,122); Catonsville, MD |
| January 28, 2007 | | Binghamton | W 51–48 | 10–12 (6–3) | Retriever Activities Center (1,812); Catonsville, MD |
| January 31, 2007 | | at Albany | L 58–82 | 10–13 (6–4) | SEFCU Arena (3,211); Albany, NY |
| February 3, 2007 | | Stony Brook | L 39–56 | 10–14 (6–5) | Retriever Activities Center (2,237); Catonsville, MD |
| February 8, 2007 | | at Vermont | L 57–66 | 10–15 (6–6) | Patrick Gym (2,594); Burlington, VT |
| February 15, 2007; 7:00 p.m. | | at Hartford | L 54–62 | 10–16 (6–7) | Chase Arena at Reich Family Pavilion (1,197); West Hartford, CT |
| February 18, 2007 | | Boston University | W 67–63 | 10–17 (6–8) | Retriever Activities Center (2,392); Catonsville, MD |
| February 22, 2007 | | Maine | W 80–77 | 11–17 (7–8) | Retriever Activities Center (2,609); Catonsville, MD |
| February 25, 2007 | | at New Hampshire | L 51–64 | 11–18 (7–9) | Lundholm Gym (876); Durham, NH |
America East Men's tournament
| March 2, 2007 | (5) | (4) Maine; Quarterfinals | W 70–61 | 12–18 | Agganis Arena (2,015); Boston, MA |
| March 4, 2007; ESPN Full Court | (5) | (1) Vermont; Semifinals | L 63–72 | 12–19 | Agganis Arena (3,436); Boston, MA |
*Non-conference game. ^{#}Rankings from AP Poll. (#) Tournament seedings in parentheses. S=South. All times are in Eastern.
