= James Wilson (basketball) =

American basketball player

- Born: Far Rockaway, Queens, New York City, US
- Occupation: Streetballer

James "Pookie" Wilson was a streetballer from Far Rockaway, Queens in New York City. He was named in ESPN's "Elite 24: Rucker Park legends".

== College basketball ==
He played at John Jay College. At John Jay he played under Coach Bob Fox. He was a 5'9" guard who is said to be the best person in the conference. While there he led them to the CUNY finals.

== Streetball ==
James Wilson is compared to NBA Hall of Famer, Oscar Robertson, who is mentioned amongst the best because of his stats. He is also mentioned as a comparison with Robertson because both are under-appreciated. He became famous playing at the Rucker Park Tournament. In one of the pro league tournaments he averaged 35 points per game, while also having a 62 points in a game. In 1986, he scored 63 points in an Entertainers Basketball Classic game, a record which stood for 21 years. He played in the pro league team called Chic All Stars with Steve Burtt Sr and NBA player Kevin Williams. Wilson also once scored 100 points in a game in the Police Athletic League. According to the book, Vertical Leap, he is considered one of the asphalt legends, along with Joe Hammond and Herman Knowings. He was a Rucker Park legend. In the book Rogue Financier: The Adventures of an Estranged Capitalist, he was an NBA-caliber guard.

== Personal life ==
His nephew Jamar Wilson is a professional basketball player.
