= 2005–06 Albany Great Danes men's basketball team =

American college basketball season

2005–06 Albany Great Danes men's basketball

America East tournament champions America East regular season champions

NCAA tournament, Round of 64
- Conference: America East Conference
- Record: 21–11 (13–3 AE)
- Head coach: Will Brown (5th season)
- Home arena: SEFCU Arena

2005–06 America East men's basketball standings
	Conf.				Overall
Team	W		L	PCT	W		L	PCT
Albany †	13	–	3	.813	21	–	11	.656
Binghamton	12	–	4	.750	16	–	13	.552
Boston University	9	–	7	.563	12	–	16	.429
Hartford	9	–	7	.563	13	–	15	.464
New Hampshire	8	–	8	.500	12	–	17	.414
Vermont	7	–	9	.438	13	–	17	.433
Maine	7	–	9	.438	12	–	16	.429
UMBC	5	–	11	.313	10	–	19	.345
Stony Brook	2	–	14	.125	4	–	24	.143
† 2006 America East tournament winner As of March 14, 2006; Rankings from AP Poll

The 2005–06 Albany Great Danes men's basketball team represented the University at Albany, SUNY in the 2005–06 NCAA Division I men's basketball season. The Great Danes, led by head coach Will Brown, played their home games at the SEFCU Arena in Albany, New York, as members of the America East Conference. After finishing atop the conference regular season standings, the Great Danes won the America East tournament to earn an automatic bid to the NCAA tournament – the first appearance in program history. Playing as No. 16 seed in the Washington, D.C. region, Albany was beaten by No. 1 seed UConn in the first round, 72–59.

== Roster ==
2005–06 Albany Great Danes men's basketball team
Players
Coaches

Pos.	#	Name	Height	Weight	Year	Hometown
G	00	Carl Ross	6 ft 4 in (1.93 m)	—	So	Fresno, California
G/F	1	Jason Siggers	6 ft 4 in (1.93 m)	—	Jr	Dallas, Texas
G	2	Michael Knight	6 ft 3 in (1.91 m)	—	So	Seattle, Washington
G	3	David Bauman	6 ft 2 in (1.88 m)	—	So	Sarver, Pennsylvania
G	14	Jon Iati	5 ft 9 in (1.75 m)	—	So	York, Pennsylvania
G/F	21	Brian Lillis	6 ft 5 in (1.96 m)	—	So	Urbandale, Iowa
G	31	Jamar Wilson	6 ft 1 in (1.85 m)	—	Jr	Bronx, New York
F	33	Brian Connelly	6 ft 8 in (2.03 m)	—	Fr	Audubon, New Jersey
F	34	Brent Wilson	6 ft 8 in (2.03 m)	—	So	Cedar Rapids, Iowa
F/C	42	Jimmie Covington	6 ft 7 in (2.01 m)	—	Fr	Chicago, Illinois

Head coach

- Will Brown (Dowling)

Assistant coach(es)

Legend

- (C) Team captain
- (S) Suspended
- (I) Ineligible
- (W) Walk-on
- Injured
- Current redshirt

Roster

== Schedule and results ==
Date time, TV	Rank^{#}	Opponent^{#}	Result	Record	Site city, state
Regular season
Nov 9, 2005*		vs. Oakland	W 90–73	1–0	Stephen C. O'Connell Center (9,117); Gainesville, Florida
Nov 10, 2005*		at Florida	L 64–83	1–1	Stephen C. O'Connell Center (8,528); Gainesville, Florida
Nov 21, 2005*		Sacred Heart	L 61–63	1–2	Recreation and Convocation Center (2,542); Albany, New York
Nov 26, 2005*		at San Diego State	L 53–80	1–3	Cox Arena (5,032); San Diego, California
Nov 29, 2005*		at No. 16 UCLA	L 65–73	1–4	Pauley Pavilion (6,194); Los Angeles, California
Dec 3, 2005*		at Siena	L 74–82 ^{OT}	1–5	Pepsi Arena (8,641); Albany, New York
Dec 10, 2005*		at Cleveland State	W 78–65	2–5	Wolstein Center (1,492); Cleveland, Ohio
Dec 17, 2005*		Harvard	L 48–61	2–6	Recreation and Convocation Center (2,147); Albany, New York
Dec 20, 2005		Binghamton	W 70–65	3–6 (1–0)	Recreation and Convocation Center (2,352); Albany, New York
Feb 26, 2006		at UMBC	W 76–61	18–10 (13–3)	RAC Arena (2,316); Catonsville, Maryland
America East tournament
Mar 4, 2006*		vs. UMBC; Quarterfinals	W 79–65	19–10	Events Center (2,401); Vestal, New York
Mar 5, 2006*		vs. New Hampshire; Semifinals	W 67–54	20–10	Events Center (4,445); Vestal, New York
Mar 11, 2006*		Vermont; Championship game	W 80–67	21–10	Recreation and Convocation Center (4,538); Albany, New York
NCAA tournament
Mar 17, 2006*	(16 DC)	vs. (1 DC) No. 2 Connecticut; First round	L 59–72	21–11	Wachovia Center (19,990); Philadelphia, Pennsylvania
*Non-conference game. ^{#}Rankings from AP Poll. (#) Tournament seedings in parentheses. DC=Washington, D.C..
