= 2012–13 UMBC Retrievers men's basketball team =

American college basketball season

2012–13 UMBC Retrievers men's basketball
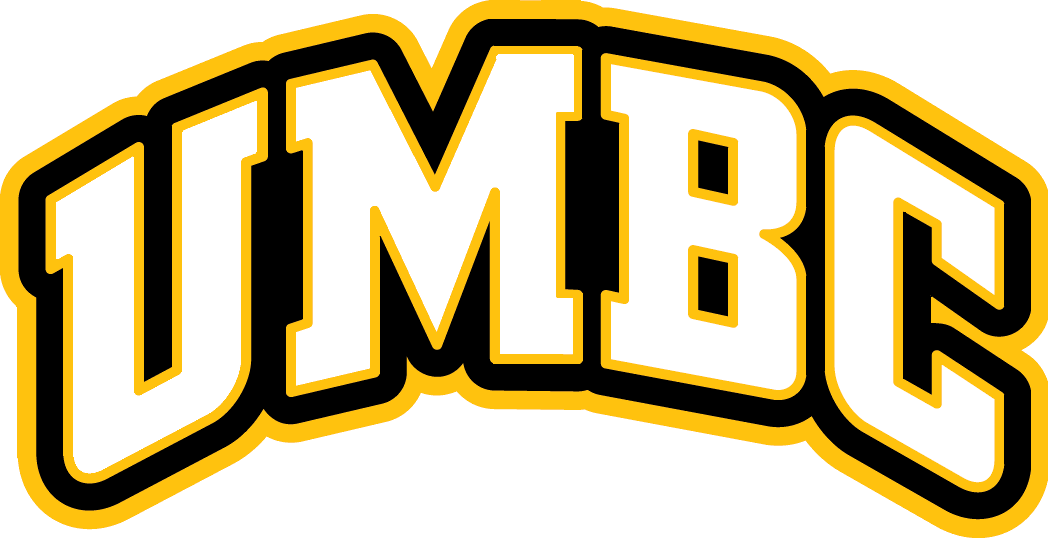
- Conference: America East Conference
- Record: 8–23 (5–11 America East)
- Head coach: Aki Thomas (1st season)
- Assistant coaches: Walt Fuller; Jay Greene
- Home arena: Retriever Activities Center

2012–13 America East men's basketball standings
	Conf.				Overall
Team	W		L	PCT	W		L	PCT
Stony Brook	14	–	2	.875	25	–	8	.758
Vermont	11	–	5	.688	21	–	12	.636
Boston University*	11	–	5	.688	17	–	13	.567
Hartford	10	–	6	.625	17	–	14	.548
Albany †	9	–	7	.563	24	–	11	.686
Maine	6	–	10	.375	11	–	19	.367
New Hampshire	5	–	11	.313	9	–	20	.310
UMBC	5	–	11	.313	8	–	23	.258
Binghamton	1	–	15	.063	3	–	27	.100
† 2013 America East tournament winner As of March 22, 2013; Rankings from AP Poll; *Ineligible for conference tournament due to changing conferences in 2013

The 2012–13 UMBC Retrievers men's basketball team represented the University of Maryland, Baltimore County during the 2012–13 NCAA Division I men's basketball season. The Retrievers, led by first-year head coach Aki Thomas, played their home games at the Retriever Activities Center and were members of the America East Conference. They finished the season 8–23, 5–11 in American East play to finish in a tie for seventh place. They advanced to the semifinals of the America East tournament where they fell to Vermont.

== Roster ==
Number	Name	Position	Height	Weight	Year	Hometown
0	Aaron Morgan	Guard	5–11	175	Freshman	Washington, Pennsylvania
1	Chase Plummer	Forward	6–6	230	Junior	Plainfield, New Jersey
3	Quentin Jones	Guard	6–0	185	Junior	Ellicott City, Maryland
4	Nate Basalyga	Forward/Center	6–9	240	Sophomore	Scranton, Pennsylvania
5	Joey Getz	Guard	6–0	180	Sophomore	Philadelphia, Pennsylvania
11	Jarrel Lane	Guard	6–0	160	Sophomore	Rahway, New Jersey
12	Ryan Cook	Guard	6–2	190	Senior	Laurel, Maryland
15	Brian Neller	Guard	6–4	195	Senior	Red Bank, New Jersey
21	Jamar Wertz	Guard	6–4	195	Junior	Suffolk, Virginia
23	Jordan Wejnert	Guard	6–6	205	Sophomore	Lavallette, New Jersey
24	Will Wise	Forward	6–8	225	Sophomore	Philadelphia, Pennsylvania
30	Adrian Satchell	Forward	6–5	205	Senior	Windsor, Connecticut
33	Malik Garner	Forward	6–6	220	Freshman	Philadelphia, Pennsylvania
35	Brett Roseboro	Forward/Center	6–10	240	Junior	Quakertown, Pennsylvania

== Schedule ==
Date time, TV	Rank^{#}	Opponent^{#}	Result	Record	Site (attendance) city, state
Regular season
11/09/2012*; 7:00 pm		at Penn	L 75–80	0–1	The Palestra (3,605); Philadelphia, PA
11/12/2012*; 7:00 pm		Eastern	W 70–52	1–1	Retriever Activities Center (1,719); Catonsville, MD
11/14/2012*; 9:00 pm, MASN		at Loyola (MD)	L 70–86	1–2	Reitz Arena (916); Baltimore, MD
11/20/2012*; 7:30 pm		Central Connecticut	L 82–83 ^{OT}	1–3	Retriever Activities Center (1,988); Catonsville, MD
11/26/2012*; 8:00 pm, ESPN3		at Marquette	L 46–79	1–4	BMO Harris Bradley Center (12,679); Milwaukee, WI
11/29/2012*; 7:00 pm		Canisius	L 65–83	1–5	Retriever Activities Center (1,520); Catonsville, MD
12/01/2012*; 7:00 pm		Towson	W 66–62	2–5	Retriever Activities Center (1,627); Catonsville, MD
12/04/2012*; 7:00 pm		at George Mason	L 63–74	2–6	Patriot Center (3,509); Fairfax, VA
12/06/2012*; 7:00 pm		American	L 70–73 ^{2OT}	2–7	Retriever Activities Center (1,305); Catonsville, MD
12/09/2012*; 4:00 pm		at Norfolk State	L 66–83	2–8	Joseph G. Echols Memorial Hall (1,174); Norfolk, VA
12/12/2012*; 7:00 pm		Coppin State	L 61–80	2–9	Retriever Activities Center (1,624); Catonsville, MD
12/22/2012*; 2:00 pm, MASN/ESPN3		at DePaul	L 61–69	2–10	Allstate Arena (7,054); Rosemont, IL
12/29/2012*; 2:00 pm		at Mount St. Mary's	L 55–58	2–11	Knott Arena (1,011); Emmitsburg, MD
01/02/2013; 7:00 pm		at Albany	L 48–65	2–12 (0–1)	SEFCU Arena (1,821); Guilderland, NY
01/05/2013; 12:00 pm		at Maine	L 66–81	2–13 (0–2)	Alfond Arena (1,058); Orono, ME
01/09/2013; 7:00 pm		New Hampshire	W 68–57	3–13 (1–2)	Retriever Activities Center (1,152); Catonsville, MD
01/12/2013; 3:00 pm		at Vermont	L 53–68	3–14 (1–3)	Patrick Gym (2,655); Burlington, VT
01/16/2013; 7:00 pm		Hartford	W 70–57	4–14 (2–3)	Retriever Activities Center (1,205); Catonsville, MD
01/23/2013; 7:00 pm		Stony Brook	L 60–67	4–15 (2–4)	Retriever Activities Center (1,131); Catonsville, MD
01/26/2013; 1:00 pm		at Boston University	L 75–81	4–16 (2–5)	Case Gym (822); Boston, MA
01/30/2013; 7:00 pm, ESPN3		at Binghamton	W 61–58	5–16 (3–5)	Binghamton University Events Center (1,858); Vestal, NY
02/02/2013; 7:00 pm		Maine	W 68–67	6–16 (4–5)	Retriever Activities Center (1,255); Catonsville, MD
02/06/2013; 7:00 pm		Albany	L 56–79	6–17 (4–6)	Retriever Activities Center (1,707); Catonsville, MD
02/09/2013; 3:30 pm		Vermont	L 55–67	6–18 (4–7)	Retriever Activities Center (1,604); Catonsville, MD
02/13/2013; 7:00 pm		at New Hampshire	L 86–92 ^{OT}	6–19 (4–8)	Lundholm Gym (569); Durham, NH
02/19/2013; 7:00 pm		at Stony Brook	L 39–83	6–20 (4–9)	Pritchard Gymnasium (1,630); Stony Brook, NY
02/23/2013; 7:00 pm		Boston University	L 59–68	6–21 (4–10)	Retriever Activities Center (1,916); Catonsville, MD
02/28/2013; 7:00 pm		at Hartford	L 56–68	6–22 (4–11)	Chase Arena at Reich Family Pavilion (2,264); Hartford, CT
03/03/2013; 2:00 pm		Binghamton	W 59–49	7–22 (5–11)	Retriever Activities Center (1,657); Catonsville, MD
2013 America East tournament
03/09/2013; 2:25 pm, ESPN3		vs. Hartford; Quarterfinals	W 69–62	8–22	SEFCU Arena (N/A); Albany, NY
03/10/2013; 5:00 pm, ESPN3		vs. Vermont; Semifinals	L 72–85	8–23	SEFCU Arena (N/A); Albany, NY
*Non-conference game. ^{#}Rankings from AP Poll. (#) Tournament seedings in parentheses. All times are in Eastern Time.
