= Todd Cetnar =

American basketball player (born 1978)

Personal information
- Born: 1978 (age 47–48) Amsterdam, New York, U.S.
- Listed height: 6 ft 0 in (1.83 m)

Career information
- High school: Amsterdam High School
- College: Albany
- Playing career: 2000–2004
- Position: Point guard

Career history
- 2000–2002: Plymouth Raiders
- 2002: Adirondack Wildcats
- 2003: Sutton Pumas
- 2003–2004: Thames Valley Tigers

Career highlights
- NCAA Division I All-Independent First Team (2000)

Todd Cetnar (born 1978) is an American former professional basketball player who played in the United Kingdom.

== High school career ==
Cetnar was a standout player at Amsterdam High School, where he played four years on the varsity team, was the school's all-time leader in total scoring (1,621 points), assists (577), and steals (296), and was named to the All New York State first team.

== College career ==
Cetnar attended the University at Albany from 1996 to 2000 where he graduated in Communication studies and Business administration, and also starred for the College basketball team, the Great Danes. Cetnar was the second player in University at Albany history to record over 1,000 points, 350 assists and 150 steals. Over four years, his college career statistics were 1,345 points (the 9th all-time highest scoring tally at Albany), 188 steals (2nd all time), 367 assists (5th all time), 215 3-point field goals (3rd all time), and a free throw average of 82% (the 3rd all-time highest percentage). Cetnar shot 49% from three-point range during his college career.

He was named to the NCAA Division I All-Independent First Team following his senior season, Cetnar averaged 16.1 points and 4.2 assists per game. In 2000, his senior year, the six-foot-tall point guard was named University of Albany's male Athlete of the Year.

== Professional career ==
In 2000, he signed for British team Plymouth Raiders, competed in the top tier National Basketball League, where he enjoyed two successful seasons and numerous Championship medals.

In 2002, Cetnar moved back to New York and signed for USBL team Adirondack Wildcats, while also attending NBA training camps with the Boston Celtics and Detroit Pistons.

In 2003, he returned to England, where he signed for Sutton Pumas. His incredible form, achieving an average of around 30 points per game, did not go unnoticed. and on December 17, 2003, Thames Valley Tigers coach Paul James signed Cetnar as a replacement for the injured Nick Moore in the BBL.

== Coaching career ==
Cetnar finished his professional career in Britain's top league with the Thames Valley Tigers. After playing the season with the Tigers, he moved back to his homeland in 2004 to begin a college coaching career.

In 2004, he took a position as Assistant Coach with Plymouth State University's basketball team, the Panthers. After just one season with the Panthers, he left to take a coaching position at Union College in 2005, with the Dutchmen, but has since left that position.

== See also ==
- Albany Great Danes men's basketball
- Plymouth Raiders
- Thames Valley Tigers
