= 2012–13 Hartford Hawks men's basketball team =

American college basketball season

2012–13 Hartford Hawks men's basketball

CIT, First Round
- Conference: America East Conference
- Record: 17–14 (10–6 America East)
- Head coach: John Gallagher (3rd season)
- Assistant coaches: Chris Gerlufsen; Matt Blue; Bill Dooley
- Home arena: Chase Arena at Reich Family Pavilion

2012–13 America East men's basketball standings
	Conf.				Overall
Team	W		L	PCT	W		L	PCT
Stony Brook	14	–	2	.875	25	–	8	.758
Vermont	11	–	5	.688	21	–	12	.636
Boston University*	11	–	5	.688	17	–	13	.567
Hartford	10	–	6	.625	17	–	14	.548
Albany †	9	–	7	.563	24	–	11	.686
Maine	6	–	10	.375	11	–	19	.367
New Hampshire	5	–	11	.313	9	–	20	.310
UMBC	5	–	11	.313	8	–	23	.258
Binghamton	1	–	15	.063	3	–	27	.100
† 2013 America East tournament winner As of March 22, 2013; Rankings from AP Poll; *Ineligible for conference tournament due to changing conferences in 2013

The 2012–13 Hartford Hawks men's basketball team represented the University of Hartford during the 2012–13 NCAA Division I men's basketball season. The Hawks, led by third year head coach John Gallagher, played their home games at the Chase Arena at Reich Family Pavilion and were members of the America East Conference. They finished the season 17–14, 10–6 in America East play to finish in fourth place. They lost in the quarterfinals of the America East tournament to UMBC. They were invited to the 2013 CIT, their first ever Division I postseason appearance, where they lost in the first round to Rider.

== Roster ==
2012–13 Hartford Hawks men's basketball team
Players
Coaches

Pos.	#	Name	Height	Weight	Year	Previous school	Hometown
G	00	Wes Cole	6 ft 0 in (1.83 m)	165 lb (75 kg)	So	The Woodlands	The Woodlands, Texas
F	1	Mark Nwakamma	6 ft 6 in (1.98 m)	235 lb (107 kg)	So	Leander	Leander, Texas
G/F	2	Parker U'u	6 ft 5 in (1.96 m)	210 lb (95 kg)	Fr	Jesuit	Sacramento, California
G	3	Jeremiah Aska	5 ft 8 in (1.73 m)	165 lb (75 kg)	Sr	St. Raymond's	The Bronx, New York
G	4	Corban Wroe	6 ft 1 in (1.85 m)	190 lb (86 kg)	So	Australian Institute of Sport	Townsville, Queensland, Australia
G	11	Taylor Dyson	6 ft 4 in (1.93 m)	185 lb (84 kg)	Fr	Box Hill Senior Secondary	Sassafras, Victoria, Australia
F	12	John Peterson	6 ft 7 in (2.01 m)	195 lb (88 kg)	GS	Boca Raton Community; Samford	Boca Raton, Florida
G	15	Yolonzo Moore II	6 ft 2 in (1.88 m)	170 lb (77 kg)	So	Akins	Austin, Texas
G	22	Evan Cooper	6 ft 0 in (1.83 m)	175 lb (79 kg)	Fr	The Woodlands College Park	Houston, Texas
F	33	Antoine Burrell	6 ft 7 in (2.01 m)	210 lb (95 kg)	Fr	Colony	The Colony, Texas
F	34	Glenn Akerland	6 ft 6 in (1.98 m)	215 lb (98 kg)	Jr	Pleasant Grove; Mesa State JC	Sacramento, California
F	43	Nate Sikma	6 ft 6 in (1.98 m)	225 lb (102 kg)	So	Bellevue	Bellevue, Washington
F	44	Oren Faulk	6 ft 7 in (2.01 m)	250 lb (113 kg)	Jr	Muskogee	Muskogee, Oklahoma
F/C	50	Jamie Schneck	6 ft 8 in (2.03 m)	225 lb (102 kg)	So	Whitefish Bay	Whitefish Bay, Wisconsin

Head coach

- John Gallagher (Saint Joseph's)

Assistant coach(es)

- Chris Gerlufsen (Randolph–Macon)
- Matt Blue
- Bill Dooley (Richmond)

Legend

- (C) Team captain
- (S) Suspended
- (I) Ineligible
- (W) Walk-on
- Injured
- Current redshirt

Roster
Last update: April 28, 2020

== Schedule ==
Date time, TV	Rank^{#}	Opponent^{#}	Result	Record	Site (attendance) city, state
Non-conference regular season
11/10/2012*; 3:00 pm		Quinnipiac; Connecticut 6 Classic	L 61–65	0–1	Chase Arena at Reich Family Pavilion (3,186); West Hartford, CT
11/13/2012*; 7:00 pm		at Mount St. Mary's	L 63–70	0–2	Knott Arena (1,522); Emmitsburg, MD
11/16/2012*; 7:00 pm		Sacred Heart	W 62–47	1–2	Chase Arena at Reich Family Pavilion (1,611); West Hartford, CT
11/20/2012*; 7:00 pm		La Salle	L 51–64	1–3	Chase Arena at Reich Family Pavilion (819); West Hartford, CT
11/24/2012*; 4:00 pm		Central Connecticut; Rivalry	W 80–77	2–3	Chase Arena at Reich Family Pavilion (1,302); West Hartford, CT
11/29/2012*; 7:00 pm		at Yale	W 60–51	3–3	Payne Whitney Gymnasium (582); New Haven, CT
12/01/2012*; 7:00 pm		Holy Cross	W 48–45	4–3	Chase Arena at Reich Family Pavilion (1,620); West Hartford, CT
12/05/2012*; 8:30 pm, Pac-12 Network		at Arizona State	L 63–71	4–4	Wells Fargo Center (4,487); Tempe, AZ
12/09/2012*; 4:00 pm		at Fairleigh Dickinson	W 69–59	5–4	Rothman Center (355); Hackensack, NJ
12/12/2012*; 7:00 pm		at Niagara	L 59–75	5–5	Gallagher Center (1,556); Lewiston, NY
12/15/2012*; 8:00 pm		at Rice	W 58–51	6–5	Tudor Fieldhouse (1,632); Houston, TX
12/22/2012*; 3:30 pm		Marist	W 56–46	7–5	Chase Arena at Reich Family Pavilion (3,508); West Hartford, CT
12/29/2012*; 2:00 pm, Pac-12		at Colorado	L 52–80	7–6	Coors Events Center (10,228); Boulder, CO
01/02/2013; 7:00 pm		at Binghamton	W 71–68	8–6 (1–0)	Chase Arena at Reich Family Pavilion (797); West Hartford, CT
01/05/2013; 1:00 pm		at Boston University	W 77–74	9–6 (2–0)	Case Gym (479); Boston, MA
01/09/2013; 12:00 pm		Maine	W 68–61	10–6 (3–0)	Chase Arena at Reich Family Pavilion (2,811); West Hartford, CT
01/12/2013; 2:00 pm		Stony Brook	L 59–73	10–7 (3–1)	Pritchard Gymnasium (1,630); Stony Brook, NY
01/16/2013; 7:00 pm		at UMBC	L 57–70	10–8 (3–2)	Retriever Activities Center (1,205); Catonsville, MD
01/19/2013; 7:00 pm		Albany	L 46–56	10–9 (3–3)	Chase Arena at Reich Family Pavilion (1,996); West Hartford, CT
01/24/2013; 7:00 pm, ESPN3		at New Hampshire	W 51–40	11–9 (4–3)	Lundholm Gym (N/A); Durham, NH
01/30/2013; 7:00 pm		Vermont	L 43–49	11–10 (4–4)	Chase Arena at Reich Family Pavilion (1,809); West Hartford, CT
02/02/2013; 7:00 pm		Boston University	W 66–58	12–10 (5–4)	Chase Arena at Reich Family Pavilion (2,514); West Hartford, CT
02/06/2013; 7:00 pm, ESPN3		at Binghamton	W 76–62	13–10 (6–4)	Binghamton University Events Center (2,461); Vestal, NY
02/10/2013; 2:04 pm, ESPN3		Stony Brook	W 60–55	14–10 (7–4)	Chase Arena at Reich Family Pavilion (1,398); West Hartford, CT
02/13/2013; 7:30 pm		at Maine	L 64–66	14–11 (7–5)	Alfond Arena (1,004); Orono, ME
02/16/2013; 7:00 pm		at Albany	L 49–75	14–12 (7–6)	SEFCU Arena (2,906); Albany, NY
02/20/2013; 7:00 pm		New Hampshire	W 49–44	15–12 (8–6)	Chase Arena at Reich Family Pavilion (2,263); West Hartford, CT
02/28/2013; 7:00 pm		UMBC	W 68–56	16–12 (9–6)	Chase Arena at Reich Family Pavilion (2,264); West Hartford, CT
03/03/2013; 2:00 pm		at Vermont	W 61–58	17–12 (10–6)	Patrick Gym (2,850); Burlington, VT
America East Men's tournament
03/09/2013; 2:25 pm, ESPN3		vs. UMBC; Quarterfinals	L 62–69	17–13	SEFCU Arena (N/A); Albany, NY
2013 CIT
03/19/2013*; 7:00 pm		Rider; First Round	L 54–63	17–14	Chase Arena at Reich Family Pavilion (871); West Hartford, CT
*Non-conference game. ^{#}Rankings from AP Poll. (#) Tournament seedings in parentheses. All times are in Eastern Time.
