= 2013 America East men's basketball tournament =

- 2013 America East tournament logo
- Classification: Division I
- Season: 2012–13
- Teams: 8
- Quarterfinals site: SEFCU Arena; Albany, NY
- Semifinals site: SEFCU Arena; Albany, NY
- Finals site: Patrick Gym; Burlington, VT
- Champions: Albany (3rd title)
- Winning coach: Will Brown (3rd title)
- Television: ESPN3, ESPN2

2012–13 America East men's basketball standings
	Conf.				Overall
Team	W		L	PCT	W		L	PCT
Stony Brook	14	–	2	.875	25	–	8	.758
Vermont	11	–	5	.688	21	–	12	.636
Boston University*	11	–	5	.688	17	–	13	.567
Hartford	10	–	6	.625	17	–	14	.548
Albany †	9	–	7	.563	24	–	11	.686
Maine	6	–	10	.375	11	–	19	.367
New Hampshire	5	–	11	.313	9	–	20	.310
UMBC	5	–	11	.313	8	–	23	.258
Binghamton	1	–	15	.063	3	–	27	.100
† 2013 America East tournament winner As of March 22, 2013; Rankings from AP Poll; *Ineligible for conference tournament due to changing conferences in 2013

The 2013 America East men's basketball tournament began on March 9 and concluded with the championship game on March 16. The quarterfinals and semifinals were played on March 9 and 10 at SEFCU Arena in Albany, NY, while the 2013 championship game was held on March 16 at the home of the highest remaining seed. The winner earned an automatic bid to the 2013 NCAA tournament.

Although the conference had nine members, only eight participated in that year's tournament. Boston University, which left the America East after the season to join the Patriot League, had been barred from conference postseason play. America East bylaws allowed the conference to prevent a departing member from participating in its postseason tournaments, and the America East chose to enforce this rule against Boston University.

== Bracket and Results ==
Quarterfinals; Saturday, March 9, 2013; ESPN3
1	Stony Brook	72
8	Binghamton	49
4	Albany	50
5	Maine	49
2	Vermont	61
7	New Hampshire	42
3	Hartford	62
6	UMBC	69

Semifinals; Sunday, March 10, 2013; ESPN3
1	Stony Brook	59
4	Albany	61
2	Vermont	85
6	UMBC	72

Championship Game; Saturday, March 16, 2013; ESPN2
4	Albany	53
2	Vermont	49

Championship game hosted by Vermont.

All times listed are Eastern

== See also ==
- America East Conference
