= 2012–13 Stony Brook Seawolves men's basketball team =

American college basketball season

2012–13 Stony Brook Seawolves men's basketball

American East Regular Season Champions

NIT, Second Round
- Conference: America East Conference
- Record: 25–8 (14–2 America East)
- Head coach: Steve Pikiell (8th season)
- Assistant coaches: Jay Young (8th season); Lamar Chapman; Dan Rickard
- Home arena: Pritchard Gymnasium

2012–13 America East men's basketball standings
	Conf.				Overall
Team	W		L	PCT	W		L	PCT
Stony Brook	14	–	2	.875	25	–	8	.758
Vermont	11	–	5	.688	21	–	12	.636
Boston University*	11	–	5	.688	17	–	13	.567
Hartford	10	–	6	.625	17	–	14	.548
Albany †	9	–	7	.563	24	–	11	.686
Maine	6	–	10	.375	11	–	19	.367
New Hampshire	5	–	11	.313	9	–	20	.310
UMBC	5	–	11	.313	8	–	23	.258
Binghamton	1	–	15	.063	3	–	27	.100
† 2013 America East tournament winner As of March 22, 2013; Rankings from AP Poll; *Ineligible for conference tournament due to changing conferences in 2013

The 2012–13 Stony Brook Seawolves men's basketball team represented Stony Brook University in the 2012–13 NCAA Division I men's basketball season. They were coached by eighth year head coach Steve Pikiell and played their home games at Pritchard Gymnasium. They were members of the America East Conference. They finished the season 25–8, 14–2 in America East play to become America East regular season champions. They advanced to the semifinals of the America East tournament where they lost to Albany. As a regular season conference champion who failed to win their conference tournament, they received an automatic bid to the 2013 NIT. The Seawolves defeated Massachusetts in the first round for their first ever postseason tournament victory in school history. They lost in the second round to Iowa.

== Previous season ==
After being picked second, behind the Boston Terriers, in the conference coaches preseason poll the Seawolves exceeded expectations capturing their second regular season championship in three years. Stony Brook went 5–6 through the non-conference regular season. Among their losses were Indiana, Northwestern, Boston College, and Rutgers in the Madison Square Garden Holiday Festival. Despite the slow start, the Seawolves cruised through the conference season capturing a program record 14 wins and 2 losses to earn the title. In the America East tournament Stony Brook went on to defeat the Binghamton Bearcats and Albany Great Danes to advance to their second consecutive championship game. The following week Stony Brook faced off against Vermont at the Stony Brook Arena falling by a score of 43–51. Despite their championship exit, Stony Brook participated in the 2012 NIT First Round falling by the score of 63–61 in the last bucket to end their season.

== Before the season ==
=== Losses ===
The Seawolves lost to graduation Danny Carter, all-time points leader Bryan Dougher, Dallis Joyner, and Al Rapier.

=== Recruitment ===
College recruiting information
Name	Hometown	School	Height	Weight	Commit date
Carson Puriefoy; G	Wenonah, New Jersey, U.S.	Bishop Eustace	6 ft 0 in (1.83 m)	165 lb (75 kg)	
Carson Puriefoy; G	Recruit ratings: No ratings found				
Ahmad Reid; G	Port Washington, NY	Berkshire School	6 ft 4 in (1.93 m)	170 lb (77 kg)	
Ahmad Reid; G	Recruit ratings: No ratings found				
Jameel Warney; F	Plainfield, NJ	Roselle Catholic	6 ft 7 in (2.01 m)	220 lb (100 kg)	
Jameel Warney; F	Recruit ratings: No ratings found				
Ryan Burnett; G	Richmond, VA	Benedictine Prep	6 ft 4 in (1.93 m)	175 lb (79 kg)	
Ryan Burnett; G	Recruit ratings: No ratings found				
Overall recruit ranking:
Note: In many cases, Scout, Rivals, 247Sports, On3, and ESPN may conflict in their listings of height and weight.; In these cases, the average was taken. ESPN grades are on a 100-point scale.; Sources: "2012 Team Ranking". Rivals.

=== Ranking and polls ===
Stony Brook was chosen second, behind the Vermont Catamounts, in the 2012 America East Preseason Coaches Poll ahead Boston University.

== Roster ==
2011–12 Stony Brook Seawolves men's basketball team
Players
Coaches

Pos.	#	Name	Height	Weight	Year	Hometown
G/F	1	Ron Bracey	6 ft 5 in (1.96 m)	220 lb (100 kg)	Sr	Cincinnati, OH
G	4	Anthony Jackson	6 ft 0 in (1.83 m)	180 lb (82 kg)	Jr	Columbus, Ohio
G	5	Dave Coley	6 ft 2 in (1.88 m)	190 lb (86 kg)	Jr	Brooklyn, NY
G	11	Ben Resner	6 ft 3 in (1.91 m)	190 lb (86 kg)	Sr	Farmingdale, NY
G	12	Marcus Rouse	6 ft 0 in (1.83 m)	180 lb (82 kg)	Sr	Upper Marlboro, MD
G	12	Leonard Hayes	6 ft 4 in (1.93 m)	190 lb (86 kg)	Sr	Voorhees, NJ
F	22	Eric McAlister	6 ft 8 in (2.03 m)	215 lb (98 kg)	RS Jr	Hightstown, NJ
G/F	24	Tommy Brenton	6 ft 5 in (1.96 m)	220 lb (100 kg)	RS Sr	Columbia, MD
F	32	Anthony Mayo	6 ft 9 in (2.06 m)	235 lb (107 kg)	So	Philadelphia, PA
F	35	Scott King	6 ft 8 in (2.03 m)	200 lb (91 kg)	Fr	Plymouth, NH
G		Carson Puriefoy	6 ft 0 in (1.83 m)	165 lb (75 kg)	Fr	Wenonah, NJ
G		Ahmad Reid	6 ft 4 in (1.93 m)	170 lb (77 kg)	Fr	Port Washington, NY
F		Jameel Warney	6 ft 7 in (2.01 m)	220 lb (100 kg)	Fr	Plainfield, NJ
G		Ryan Burnett	6 ft 4 in (1.93 m)	175 lb (79 kg)	Fr	Richmond, VA

Head coach

- Steve Pikiell

Assistant coach(es)

- Jay Young (Marist)
- Lamar Chapman
- Dan Rickard

Legend

- (C) Team captain
- (S) Suspended
- (I) Ineligible
- (W) Walk-on
- Injured
- Current redshirt

Roster
Last update: July 11, 2012

== Coaching ==
Name	Type	College	Graduating year
Steve Pikiell	Head coach	Connecticut	1990
Jay Young	Associate head coach	Marist	1986
Lamar Chapman	Assistant coach	Lane	1993
Dan Rickard	Assistant coach	Stony Brook	2004
Ricky Lucas	Director of Basketball Operations	Stony Brook	2008

== Schedule ==
Date time, TV	Rank^{#}	Opponent^{#}	Result	Record	Site (attendance) city, state
Non-conference regular season
11/09/2012*; 9:00 pm		at Marist	W 60–57	1–0	McCann Field House (1,904); Poughkeepsie, NY
11/11/2012*; 4:00 pm		Mount Ida	W 93–57	2–0	Pritchard Gymnasium (1,170); Stony Brook, NY
11/13/2012*; 6:00 am, ESPN		at Rider; ESPN Tip-Off Marathon	W 54–46	3–0	Alumni Gymnasium (1,650); Lawrenceville, NJ
11/18/2012*; 2:00 pm		Sacred Heart	L 62–64	3–1	Pritchard Gymnasium (1,137); Stony Brook, NY
11/24/2012*; 2:00 pm		Canisius	W 82–75	4–1	Pritchard Gymnasium (1,014); Stony Brook, NY
11/25/2012*; 2:00 pm, SNY/ESPN3		at No. 21 Connecticut	L 62–73	4–2	Harry A. Gampel Pavilion (8,474); Storrs, CT
11/28/2012*; 7:00 pm		at Cornell	W 76–53	5–2	Newman Arena (1,816); Ithaca, NY
12/1/2012*; 2:00 pm		Eastern Illinois	W 66–52	6–2	Pritchard Gymnasium (1,323); Stony Brook, NY
12/11/2012*; 7:00 pm		at St. Francis Brooklyn	W 77–61	7–2	Generoso Pope Athletic Complex (262); Brooklyn, NY
12/18/2012*; 7:00 pm		at Sacred Heart	W 64–59	8–2	William H. Pitt Center (319); Fairfield, CT
12/21/2012*; 8:00 pm, ESPN3		at Maryland	L 69–76	8–3	Comcast Center (10,721); College Park, MD
12/28/2012*; 7:00 pm, SNY/ESPN3		at Seton Hall	L 59–60	8–4	Prudential Center (7,288); Newark, NJ
01/01/2013*; 2:00 pm, ESPN3		at Manhattan	W 50–44	9–4	Draddy Gymnasium (1,634); Bronx, NY
America East regular season
01/05/2013; 2:00 pm		New Hampshire	W 65–49	10–4 (1–0)	Pritchard Gymnasium (1,630); Stony Brook, NY
01/09/2013; 7:00 pm		at Binghamton	W 62–37	11–4 (2–0)	Events Center (1,835); Vestal, NY
01/12/2013; 2:00 pm		Hartford	W 73–59	12–4 (3–0)	Pritchard Gymnasium (1,630); Stony Brook, NY
01/15/2013; 7:00 pm, ESPN3		Boston University	W 75–48	13–4 (4–0)	Pritchard Gymnasium (1,630); Stony Brook, NY
01/18/2013; 7:00 pm, ESPNU		at Vermont	L 73–81	13–5 (4–1)	Patrick Gym (2,964); Burlington, VT
01/23/2013; 7:00 pm		at UMBC	W 67–60	14–5 (5–1)	Retriever Activities Center (1,131); Baltimore, MD
01/26/2013; 2:00 pm		Maine	W 79–69	15–5 (6–1)	Pritchard Gymnasium (1,630); Stony Brook, NY
01/29/2013; 7:00 pm, ESPN3		at Albany	W 65–49	16–5 (7–1)	Albany, NY (N/A); SEFCU Arena
02/02/2013; 4:00 pm		at New Hampshire	W 56–54	17–5 (8–1)	Durham, NH (912); Lundholm Gym
02/10/2013; 2:50 pm		at Hartford	L 55–60	17–6 (8–2)	Chase Arena at RFP (1,398); West Hartford, CT
02/12/2013; 7:00 pm		Binghamton	W 73–47	18–6 (9–2)	Pritchard Gymnasium (1,311); Stony Brook, NY
02/15/2013; 7:00 pm, ESPN3		Vermont	W 65–48	19–6 (10–2)	Pritchard Gymnasium (1,630); Stony Brook, NY
02/19/2013; 7:00 pm, Optimum 118		UMBC	W 83–39	20–6 (11–2)	Pritchard Gymnasium (1,630); Stony Brook, NY
02/24/2013; 1:00 pm		at Maine	W 69–53	21–6 (12–2)	Alfond Arena (1,282); Orono, ME
02/28/2013; 7:00 pm		at Boston University	W 71–55	22–6 (13–2)	Case Gym (1,712); Boston, MA
03/03/2013; 2:00 pm, ESPN3		Albany	W 75–70	23–6 (14–2)	Pritchard Gymnasium (1,630); Stony Brook, NY
2013 America East tournament
03/09/2013; 6:00 pm, ESPN3	(1)	vs. (8) Binghamton; Quarterfinals	W 72–49	24–6	SEFCU Arena (N/A); Albany, NY
03/10/2013; 7:30 pm, ESPN3	(1)	at (4) Albany; Semifinals	L 59–61	24–7	SEFCU Arena (N/A); Albany, NY
2013 NIT
03/20/2013*; 7:15 pm, ESPN3	(7)	at (2) Massachusetts; First Round	W 71–58	25–7	William D. Mullins Memorial Center (2,173); Amherst, MA
03/22/2013*; 9:30 pm, ESPNU	(7)	at (3) Iowa; Second Round	L 63–75	25–8	Carver-Hawkeye Arena (15,400); Iowa City, IA
*Non-conference game. ^{#}Rankings from AP Poll. (#) Tournament seedings in parentheses. All times are in Eastern Time. (#) during NIT is seed within region.
