= 2012–13 Boston University Terriers men's basketball team =

American college basketball season

2012–13 Boston University Terriers men's basketball

CIT, First Round
- Conference: America East Conference
- Record: 17–13 (11–5 America East)
- Head coach: Joe Jones (2nd season)
- Assistant coaches: Curtis Wilson; Carmen Maciariello; Shaun Morris
- Home arena: Case Gym

2012–13 America East men's basketball standings
	Conf.				Overall
Team	W		L	PCT	W		L	PCT
Stony Brook	14	–	2	.875	25	–	8	.758
Vermont	11	–	5	.688	21	–	12	.636
Boston University*	11	–	5	.688	17	–	13	.567
Hartford	10	–	6	.625	17	–	14	.548
Albany †	9	–	7	.563	24	–	11	.686
Maine	6	–	10	.375	11	–	19	.367
New Hampshire	5	–	11	.313	9	–	20	.310
UMBC	5	–	11	.313	8	–	23	.258
Binghamton	1	–	15	.063	3	–	27	.100
† 2013 America East tournament winner As of March 22, 2013; Rankings from AP Poll; *Ineligible for conference tournament due to changing conferences in 2013

The 2012–13 Boston University Terriers men's basketball team represented Boston University during the 2012–13 NCAA Division I men's basketball season. The Terriers, led by second year head coach Joe Jones, played their home games at Case Gym and were members of the America East Conference. This was their final year in the America East as they joined the Patriot League in July 2013. Due to the coming conference change, the Terriers were not eligible to participate in the 2013 America East tournament. They finished the season 17–13, 11–5 in America East play to finish in a tie for second place. They were invited to the 2013 CIT where they lost in the first round to Loyola (MD).

== Roster ==
2012–13 Boston University Terriers men's basketball team
Players
Coaches

Pos.	#	Name	Height	Weight	Year	Hometown
G	2	John Papale	6 ft 3 in (1.91 m)	190 lb (86 kg)	Fr	Wallingford, Connecticut
G	3	Zach Chionuma	6 ft 5 in (1.96 m)	190 lb (86 kg)	So	Jamesville, New York
G	13	DJ Irving (C)	6 ft 0 in (1.83 m)	175 lb (79 kg)	Jr	Chester, Pennsylvania
F	14	Nathan Dieudonne	6 ft 7 in (2.01 m)	210 lb (95 kg)	Fr	Crestwood, Kentucky
F	15	Dom Morris (C)	6 ft 7 in (2.01 m)	240 lb (109 kg)	Jr	Newark, Delaware
G	22	Maurice Watson	5 ft 10 in (1.78 m)	165 lb (75 kg)	Fr	Lansdale, Pennsylvania
F	23	James Kennedy	6 ft 6 in (1.98 m)	225 lb (102 kg)	So	Boston, Massachusetts
F	24	Travis Robinson (C)	6 ft 5 in (1.96 m)	190 lb (86 kg)	Jr	Philadelphia, Pennsylvania
G	25	Dylan Brossman (W)	5 ft 9 in (1.75 m)	160 lb (73 kg)	So	Reamstown, Pennsylvania
G/F	31	Malik Thomas	6 ft 7 in (2.01 m)	190 lb (86 kg)	So	Harlem, New York
F	32	Justin Alston	6 ft 8 in (2.03 m)	220 lb (100 kg)	Fr	Washington, D.C.

Head coach

- Joe Jones (SUNY–Oswego)

Assistant coach(es)

- Curtis Wilson (Adelphi)
- Carmen Maciariello (Siena)
- Shaun Morris (Lycoming)

Legend

- (C) Team captain
- (S) Suspended
- (I) Ineligible
- (W) Walk-on
- Injured
- Current redshirt

Roster

== Schedule ==
Date time, TV	Opponent	Result	Record	Site (attendance) city, state
Regular season
11/09/2012*; 7:00 pm	at Northeastern	L 64–65	0–1	Matthews Arena (3,242); Boston, MA
11/12/2012*; 7:00 pm	at Canisius	L 75–83	0–2	Koessler Athletic Center (1,422); Buffalo, NY
11/17/2012*; 1:00 pm, NESN	George Washington	L 59–72	0–3	Case Gym (1,007); Boston, MA
11/20/2012*; 7:30 pm, ESPN3	at Rutgers	L 79–81	0–4	The RAC (4,382); Piscataway, NJ
11/24/2012*; 4:00 pm	at George Mason	L 45–48	0–5	Patriot Center (4,375); Fairfax, VA
11/28/2012*; 7:00 pm	Coastal Carolina	W 74–44	1–5	Case Gym (705); Boston, MA
12/01/2012*; 2:00 pm	at Saint Peter's	W 74–66	2–5	Yanitelli Center (875); Jersey City, NJ
12/06/2012*; 7:00 pm	at Coastal Carolina	W 69–63	3–5	HTC Center (2,768); Conway, SC
12/11/2012*; 7:00 pm	at Harvard	L 64–65	3–6	Lavietes Pavilion (1,257); Boston, MA
12/16/2012*; 1:00 pm	Quinnipiac	W 69–62 ^{OT}	4–6	Case Gym (614); Boston, MA
12/22/2012*; 1:00 pm	Cornell	W 70–57	5–6	Case Gym (715); Boston, MA
12/28/2012*; 9:30 pm	vs. Belmont; UCF Holiday Classic	L 48–64	5–7	UCF Arena (4,401); Orlando, FL
12/29/2012*; 5:00 pm	vs. Howard; UCF Holiday Classic	W 71–44	6–7	UCF Arena (4,278); Orlando, FL
01/02/2013; 7:00 pm	at Maine	L 58–63	6–8 (0–1)	Alfond Arena (950); Orono, ME
01/05/2013; 1:00 pm	Hartford	L 74–77	6–9 (0–2)	Case Gym (479); Boston, MA
01/08/2013; 7:00 pm	Vermont	W 63–53	7–9 (1–2)	Case Gym (511); Boston, MA
01/12/2013; 3:15 pm	Binghamton	W 83–59	8–9 (2–2)	Case Gym (819); Boston, MA
01/15/2013; 7:00 pm, ESPN3	at Stony Brook	L 48–75	8–10 (2–3)	Pritchard Gymnasium (1,630); Stony Brook, NY
01/19/2013; 4:30 pm, WBIN/FCS	at New Hampshire	W 69–59	9–10 (3–3)	Lundholm Gym (764); Durham, NH
01/23/2013; 7:00 pm	at Albany	W 85–80 ^{OT}	10–10 (4–3)	SEFCU Arena (3,685); Albany, NY
01/26/2013; 1:00 pm	UMBC	W 81–75	11–10 (5–3)	Case Gym (822); Boston, MA
02/02/2013; 7:00 pm	at Hartford	L 58–66	11–11 (5–4)	Chase Arena at Reich Family Pavilion (2,514); Hartford, CT
02/05/2013; 7:00 pm	Maine	W 79–72	12–11 (6–4)	Case Gym (425); Boston, MA
02/09/2013; 7:00 pm	at Binghamton	W 79–58	13–11 (7–4)	Binghamton University Events Center (2,706); Vestal, NY
02/12/2013; 7:00 pm, ESPN3	at Vermont	W 64–59	14–11 (8–4)	Patrick Gym (2,217); Burlington, VT
02/17/2013; 1:00 pm	New Hampshire	W 68–56	15–11 (9–4)	Case Gym (483); Boston, MA
02/20/2013; 7:00 pm	Albany	W 79–69	16–11 (10–4)	Case Gym (712); Boston, MA
02/23/2013; 7:00 pm	at UMBC	W 68–59	17–11 (11–4)	Retriever Activities Center (1,916); Catonsville, MD
02/28/2013; 7:00 pm	Stony Brook	L 55–71	17–12 (11–5)	Case Gym (1,712); Boston, MA
2013 CIT
03/19/2013*; 7:30 pm	at Loyola (MD); First Round	L 63–70	17–13	Reitz Arena (984); Baltimore, MD
*Non-conference game. ^{#}Rankings from AP Poll. (#) Tournament seedings in parentheses. All times are in Eastern Time.
