= 2012–13 Vermont Catamounts men's basketball team =

American college basketball season

2012–13 Vermont Catamounts men's basketball

CBI, First Round
- Conference: America East Conference
- Record: 21–12 (11–5 America East)
- Head coach: John Becker (2nd season)
- Assistant coaches: Chris Markwood; Matt O'Brien; Kyle Cieplicki
- Home arena: Patrick Gym

2012–13 America East men's basketball standings
	Conf.				Overall
Team	W		L	PCT	W		L	PCT
Stony Brook	14	–	2	.875	25	–	8	.758
Vermont	11	–	5	.688	21	–	12	.636
Boston University*	11	–	5	.688	17	–	13	.567
Hartford	10	–	6	.625	17	–	14	.548
Albany †	9	–	7	.563	24	–	11	.686
Maine	6	–	10	.375	11	–	19	.367
New Hampshire	5	–	11	.313	9	–	20	.310
UMBC	5	–	11	.313	8	–	23	.258
Binghamton	1	–	15	.063	3	–	27	.100
† 2013 America East tournament winner As of March 22, 2013; Rankings from AP Poll; *Ineligible for conference tournament due to changing conferences in 2013

The 2012–13 Vermont Catamounts men's basketball team represented the University of Vermont during the 2012–13 NCAA Division I men's basketball season. The Catamounts, led by second year head coach John Becker, played their home games at Patrick Gym and were members of the America East Conference. They finished the season 21–12, 11–5 in America East play to finish in a tie for second place. They advanced to the championship game of the America East tournament where they lost to Albany. They were invited to the 2013 College Basketball Invitational where they lost in the first round to Santa Clara.

== Roster ==
2012–13 Vermont Catamounts men's basketball team
Players
Coaches

Pos.	#	Name	Height	Weight	Year	Hometown
G	0	Troy Davine (W)	6 ft 3 in (1.91 m)	185 lb (84 kg)	Fr	Rutland, Vermont
F	1	Brian Voelkel	6 ft 6 in (1.98 m)	210 lb (95 kg)	Jr	Pleasantville, New York
F	2	Luke Apfeld (C)	6 ft 7 in (2.01 m)	215 lb (98 kg)	Jr	Chattanooga, Tennessee
F/C	3	Ryan Pierson (redshirt)	6 ft 10 in (2.08 m)	240 lb (109 kg)	Jr	St. Louis, Missouri
G	4	Trey Blue	6 ft 3 in (1.91 m)	195 lb (88 kg)	Sr	Chicago, Illinois
F	5	Hector Harold (redshirt)	6 ft 7 in (2.01 m)	205 lb (93 kg)	Jr	Pasadena, California
G	12	Sandro Carissimo	6 ft 2 in (1.88 m)	170 lb (77 kg)	Jr	Sleepy Hollow, New York
G	14	Josh Elbaum	6 ft 3 in (1.91 m)	195 lb (88 kg)	Jr	Melville, New York
G/F	15	Bredan Kilpatrick	6 ft 5 in (1.96 m)	205 lb (93 kg)	Fr	Norristown, Pennsylvania
G	21	Candon Rusin	6 ft 4 in (1.93 m)	190 lb (86 kg)	RS Jr	Wilmington, Vermont
G/F	24	Harrison Taggart (redshirt)	6 ft 5 in (1.96 m)	190 lb (86 kg)	Fr	Wallingford, Vermont
F	31	Clancy Rugg	6 ft 8 in (2.03 m)	195 lb (88 kg)	Jr	Burlington, Vermont
F	32	Ethan O'Day	6 ft 9 in (2.06 m)	205 lb (93 kg)	Fr	Mansfield, Connecticut
F/C	42	Ben Crenca (C)	6 ft 10 in (2.08 m)	260 lb (118 kg)	Sr	Exeter, Rhode Island

Head coach

- John Becker

Assistant coach(es)

- Chris Markwood
- Matt O'Brien
- Kyle Cieplicki
- Ari Shapiro-Miller

Legend

- (C) Team captain
- (S) Suspended
- (I) Ineligible
- (W) Walk-on
- Injured
- Current redshirt

Roster

== Schedule ==
Date time, TV	Opponent	Result	Record	Site (attendance) city, state
Exhibition
10/27/2012*; 7:00 pm	Saint Michael's	W 68–58		Patrick Gym (1,969); Burlington, VT
11/03/2012*; 4:30 pm	Concordia (Montreal)	W 68–52		Patrick Gym (2,043); Burlington, VT
Regular season
11/09/2012*; 7:00 pm, TWCS	at Siena	W 54–53	1–0	Times Union Center (6,779); Albany, NY
11/13/2012*; 7:00 pm, SNY	at No. 23 Connecticut	L 49–67	1–1	Harry A. Gampel Pavilion (7,962); Storrs, CT
11/17/2012*; 8:00 pm	at Northeastern	W 66–55	2–1	Matthews Arena (1,369); Boston, MA
11/21/2012*; 7:00 pm	Yale	W 65–52	3–1	Patrick Gym (2,403); Burlington, VT
11/27/2012*; 7:00 pm, NBCSN	at Harvard	W 85–78	4–1	Lavietes Pavilion (1,093); Boston, MA
12/01/2012*; 2:00 pm, OSN	at Rhode Island	L 66–76	4–2	Ryan Center (4,126); Kingston, RI
12/05/2012*; 7:00 pm, WCAXtra	Towson	L 64–68	4–3	Patrick Gym (2,073); Burlington, VT
12/08/2012*; 4:00 pm, NESN	at Quinnipiac	W 53–46	5–3	TD Bank Sports Center (2,365); Hamden, CT
12/12/2012*; 7:00 pm, WCAXtra	Dartmouth	W 52–50	6–3	Patrick Gym (2,047); Burlington, VT
12/16/2012*; 2:00 pm, TWCS	at Niagara	L 58–68	6–4	Gallagher Center (1,491); Lewiston, NY
12/22/2012*; 2:00 pm, WCAXtra	Fairleigh Dickinson	W 76–62	7–4	Patrick Gym (2,013); Burlington, VT
12/29/2012*; 2:00 pm	College of Charleston	L 50–62	7–5	Patrick Gym (2,253); Burlington, VT
01/02/2013; 7:00 pm	at New Hampshire	W 64–51	8–5 (1–0)	Lundholm Gym (629); Durham, NH
01/05/2013; 2:00 pm	Albany	W 70–45	9–5 (2–0)	Patrick Gym (2,311); Burlington, NY
01/08/2013; 7:00 pm	at Boston University	L 53–63	9–6 (2–1)	Case Gym (511); Boston, MA
01/12/2013; 3:00 pm	UMBC	W 68–53	10–6 (3–1)	Patrick Gym (2,655); Burlington, NY
01/16/2013; 7:00 pm, WCAXtra	Binghamton	W 61–37	11–6 (4–1)	Patrick Gym (1,977); Burlington, NY
01/18/2013; 7:00 pm, ESPNU	Stony Brook	W 81–73	12–6 (5–1)	Patrick Gym (2,964); Burlington, NY
01/22/2013; 7:00 pm, ESPN3	at Maine	L 68–71	12–7 (5–2)	Alfond Arena (2,265); Orono, ME
01/26/2013; 7:30 pm, ESPN3	at Albany	W 50–43	13–7 (6–2)	SEFCU Arena (4,182); Albany, NY
01/30/2013; 7:00 pm	at Hartford	W 49–43	14–7 (7–2)	Chase Arena at Reich Family Pavilion (1,809); Hartford, CT
02/06/2013; 7:00 pm, WCAXtra	New Hampshire	W 63–48	15–7 (8–2)	Patrick Gym (2,085); Burlington, NY
02/09/2013; 3:30 pm	at UMBC	W 67–55	16–7 (9–2)	Retriever Activities Center (1,604); Catonsville, MD
02/12/2013; 7:00 pm, ESPN3	Boston University	L 59–64	16–8 (9–3)	Patrick Gym (2,217); Burlington, NY
02/15/2013; 7:00 pm, ESPN3	at Stony Brook	L 48–65	16–9 (9–4)	Pritchard Gymnasium (1,630); Stony Brook, NY
02/20/2013; 7:00 pm, ESPN3	Maine	W 73–61	17–9 (10–4)	Patrick Gym (2,205); Burlington, NY
02/23/2013*; 1:00 pm, ESPN3	Canisius; BracketBusters	W 87–79	18–9	Patrick Gym (2,198); Burlington, NY
02/28/2013; 7:00 pm	at Binghamton	W 78–61	19–9 (11–4)	Binghamton University Events Center (2,669); Vestal, NY
03/03/2013; 2:00 pm	Hartford	L 58–61	19–10 (11–5)	Patrick Gym (2,850); Burlington, NY
2013 America East tournament
03/09/2013; 12:00 pm, ESPN3	vs. New Hampshire; Quarterfinals	W 61–42	20–10	SEFCU Arena (N/A); Albany, NY
03/10/2013; 5:00 pm, ESPN3	vs. UMBC; Semifinals	W 85–72	21–10	SEFCU Arena (N/A); Albany, NY
03/16/2013; 11:30 am, ESPN2	Albany; Championship Game	L 49–53	21–11	Patrick Gym (3,266); Burlington, NY
2013 College Basketball Invitational
03/19/2013*; 10:00 pm	at Santa Clara; First Round	L 67–77	21–12	Leavey Center (1,011); Santa Clara, CA
*Non-conference game. ^{#}Rankings from AP Poll. (#) Tournament seedings in parentheses. All times are in Eastern Time.
