= 2012–13 Binghamton Bearcats men's basketball team =

American college basketball season

2012–13 Binghamton Bearcats men's basketball
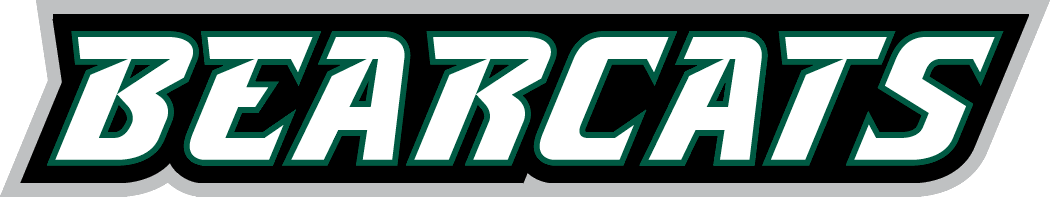
- Conference: America East Conference
- Record: 3–27 (1–15 America East)
- Head coach: Tommy Dempsey (1st season)
- Assistant coaches: Lazarus Sims; Andrew Wilson; Ben Luber
- Home arena: Binghamton University Events Center

2012–13 America East men's basketball standings
	Conf.				Overall
Team	W		L	PCT	W		L	PCT
Stony Brook	14	–	2	.875	25	–	8	.758
Vermont	11	–	5	.688	21	–	12	.636
Boston University*	11	–	5	.688	17	–	13	.567
Hartford	10	–	6	.625	17	–	14	.548
Albany †	9	–	7	.563	24	–	11	.686
Maine	6	–	10	.375	11	–	19	.367
New Hampshire	5	–	11	.313	9	–	20	.310
UMBC	5	–	11	.313	8	–	23	.258
Binghamton	1	–	15	.063	3	–	27	.100
† 2013 America East tournament winner As of March 22, 2013; Rankings from AP Poll; *Ineligible for conference tournament due to changing conferences in 2013

The 2012–13 Binghamton Bearcats men's basketball team represented Binghamton University during the 2012–13 NCAA Division I men's basketball season. The Bearcats, led by first year head coach Tommy Dempsey, played their home games at the Binghamton University Events Center and were members of the America East Conference.

The Bearcats finished the season with at 3–27, going 1–15 in American East play to finish in last place. They lost in the quarterfinals of the America East tournament to Stony Brook.

== Previous season ==
Binghamton lost the first 26 games of the 2011–12 season and were the last Division I school to remain winless until beating Vermont to end a two-season 27-game losing streak. The Bearcats finished the regular season with a 1–28 record, but beat UMBC in the first round of the America East tournament before losing to Stony Brook to end the season at 2–29, the worst record in school history and the second-worst winning percentage of all Division I schools during the season. As a result of the historically inept season, head coach Mark Macon and his staff were fired.

== Roster ==
Number	Name	Position	Height	Weight	Year	Hometown
0	Karon Waller	Guard	6–4	195	Freshman	Camden, New Jersey
2	Robert Mansell	Guard	6–4	200	Sophomore	Philadelphia, Pennsylvania
3	Jordan Reed	Guard	6–4	205	Freshman	Philadelphia, Pennsylvania
10	K.J. Brown	Guard	6–1	190	Junior	Sicklerville, New Jersey
11	Rayner Moquete	Guard	6–1	185	Junior	Santo Domingo, Dominican Republic
14	Brian Freeman	Forward	6–8	225	Junior	Clinton, Maryland
15	Alex Ogundadegbe	Forward	6–8	235	Junior	Bowie, Maryland
20	Jimmy Gray	Guard	6–0	175	Senior	Binghamton, New York
21	Javon Ralling	Forward	6–6	225	Senior	New York, New York
22	Taylor Johnston	Forward	6–7	210	Senior	Whitby, Ontario, Canada
23	Chris Rice	Guard	6–3	195	Sophomore	Sicklerville, New Jersey
24	Mike Horn	Guard	6–0	185	Senior	Woodcliff Lake, New Jersey
30	Roland Brown	Forward	6–8	240	Junior	Queens, New York
32	Jabrille Williams	Forward	6–6	190	Sophomore	Stamford, Connecticut

== Schedule ==
Date time, TV	Opponent	Result	Record	Site (attendance) city, state
Exhibition
11/03/2012*; 2:00 pm	Susquehanna	W 63–46		Binghamton University Events Center (1,841); Vestal, NY
Regular season
11/09/2012*; 7:30 pm	at Loyola (MD)	L 45–71	0–1	Reitz Arena (2,100); Baltimore, MD
11/11/2012*; 2:00 pm, TWCS	Brown	L 49–58	0–2	Binghamton University Events Center (2,075); Vestal, NY
11/14/2012*; 7:00 pm	at Navy	L 52–75	0–3	Alumni Hall (709); Annapolis, MD
11/16/2012*; 4:00 pm	at Army	L 76–85	0–4	Christl Arena (673); West Point, NY
11/18/2012*; 2:00 pm	Saint Peter's	W 62–54	1–4	Binghamton University Events Center (1,937); Vestal, NY
11/24/2012*; 7:00 pm	Marywood	W 76–51	2–4	Binghamton University Events Center (3,604); Vestal, NY
11/28/2012*; 7:00 pm	at Penn	L 54–65	2–5	The Palestra (2,712); Philadelphia, PA
12/01/2012*; 2:00 pm	Mount St. Mary's	L 70–71	2–6	Binghamton University Events Center (2,071); Vestal, NY
12/03/2012*; 7:00 pm	Monmouth	L 65–77	2–7	Binghamton University Events Center (2,271); Vestal, NY
12/08/2012*; 1:00 pm	at Bryant	L 56–78	2–8	Chace Athletic Center (845); Smithfield, RI
12/11/2012*; 7:00 pm, BTN	at No. 3 Michigan	L 39–67	2–9	Crisler Center (11,061); Ann Arbor, MI
12/28/2012*; 7:00 pm	at Colgate	L 47–74	2–10	Cotterell Court (N/A); Hamilton, NY
12/30/2012*; 2:00 pm, TWCS	Cornell	L 77–79	2–11	Binghamton University Events Center (3,673); Vestal, NY
America East regular season
01/02/2013; 7:00 pm	at Hartford	L 68–71	2–12 (0–1)	Chase Arena at Reich Family Pavilion (797); West Hartford, CT
01/07/2013; 7:00 pm, TWCS	Albany	L 59–71	2–13 (0–2)	Binghamton University Events Center (1,864); Vestal, NY
01/09/2013; 7:00 pm	Stony Brook	L 37–62	2–14 (0–3)	Binghamton University Events Center (1,835); Vestal, NY
01/12/2013; 3:15 pm	at Boston University	L 59–83	2–15 (0–4)	Case Gym (819); Boston, MA
01/16/2013; 7:00 pm	at Vermont	L 37–61	2–16 (0–5)	Patrick Gym (1,977); Burlington, VT
01/19/2013; 2:00 pm	at Maine	W 57–56	3–16 (1–5)	Memorial Gymnasium (1,273); Orono, ME
01/26/2013; 7:00 pm, TWCS	New Hampshire	L 45–63	3–17 (1–6)	Binghamton University Events Center (4,203); Vestal, NY
01/30/2013; 7:00 pm, ESPN3	UMBC	L 58–61	3–18 (1–7)	Binghamton University Events Center (1,858); Vestal, NY
02/02/2013; 7:30 pm	at Albany	L 46–79	3–19 (1–8)	SEFCU Arena (4,392); Albany, NY
02/06/2013; 7:00 pm, ESPN3	Hartford	L 62–76	3–20 (1–9)	Binghamton University Events Center (2,461); Vestal, NY
02/09/2013; 7:00 pm	Boston University	L 58–79	3–21 (1–10)	Binghamton University Events Center (2,706); Vestal, NY
02/12/2013; 7:00 pm	at Stony Brook	L 47–73	3–22 (1–11)	Pritchard Gymnasium (1,311); Stony Brook, NY
02/16/2013; 7:00 pm	Maine	L 60–64	3–23 (1–12)	Binghamton University Events Center (3,362); Vestal, NY
02/23/2013; 5:00 pm	at New Hampshire	L 56–68	3–24 (1–13)	Lundholm Gym (N/A); Durham, NH
02/28/2013; 7:00 pm	Vermont	L 61–78	3–25 (1–14)	Binghamton University Events Center (2,669); Vestal, NY
03/03/2013; 2:00 pm	at UMBC	L 49–59	3–26 (1–15)	Retriever Activities Center (1,657); Catonsville, MD
America East tournament
03/09/2013; 6:00 pm, ESPN3	vs. Stony Brook; Quarterfinals	L 49–72	3–27	SEFCU Arena (N/A); Albany, NY
*Non-conference game. ^{#}Rankings from AP Poll. (#) Tournament seedings in parentheses. All times are in Eastern Time.
