= 2012–13 Maine Black Bears men's basketball team =

American college basketball season

2012–13 Maine Black Bears men's basketball
- Conference: America East Conference
- Record: 11–19 (6–10 America East)
- Head coach: Ted Woodward (9th season)
- Assistant coaches: Nate Philippe; Douglas Leichner; Jon Sheets
- Home arena: Memorial Gym; Alfond Arena

2012–13 America East men's basketball standings
	Conf.				Overall
Team	W		L	PCT	W		L	PCT
Stony Brook	14	–	2	.875	25	–	8	.758
Vermont	11	–	5	.688	21	–	12	.636
Boston University*	11	–	5	.688	17	–	13	.567
Hartford	10	–	6	.625	17	–	14	.548
Albany †	9	–	7	.563	24	–	11	.686
Maine	6	–	10	.375	11	–	19	.367
New Hampshire	5	–	11	.313	9	–	20	.310
UMBC	5	–	11	.313	8	–	23	.258
Binghamton	1	–	15	.063	3	–	27	.100
† 2013 America East tournament winner As of March 22, 2013; Rankings from AP Poll; *Ineligible for conference tournament due to changing conferences in 2013

The 2012–13 Maine Black Bears men's basketball team represented the University of Maine during the 2012–13 NCAA Division I men's basketball season. The Black Bears, led by ninth year head coach Ted Woodward, played their home games at Alfond Arena and were members of the America East Conference. They finished the season 11–19, 6–10 in American East play to finish sixth place. They lost in the quarterfinals of the American East tournament to Albany.

== Roster ==
Number	Name	Position	Height	Weight	Year	Hometown
0	Luke Hetterman	Guard	5–9	160	Sophomore	Bangor, Maine
1	Jon McAllian	Guard	6–6	195	Senior	Bangor, Maine
3	Jon Mesghna	Forward	6–6	205	Junior	Frankfurt, Germany
5	Zarko Valjarevic	Forward	6–4	210	Sophomore	Belgrade, Serbia
10	Shaun Lawton	Guard	6–5	190	Freshman	Harlem, New York
11	Leon Cooper Jr.	Guard	6–2	170	Sophomore	Freeport, Bahamas, Bahamas
12	Xavier Pollard	Guard	6–3	190	Sophomore	Bronx, New York
13	Stefan Micovic	Forward	6–9	210	Freshman	Pondov, Serbia
14	Justin Edwards	Guard	6–3	185	Sophomore	Whitby, Ontario, Canada
15	Alasdair Fraser	Forward	6–7	235	Junior	Falkirk, Scotland
23	Kilian Cato	Forward	6–7	225	Sophomore	Espoo, Finland
25	Till Gloger	Forward	6–8	220	Freshman	Bochum, Germany
30	Dimitry Akanda-Coronel	Guard/Forward	6–4	190	Freshman	Boston, Massachusetts
33	Ethan Mackay	Forward	6–7	220	Freshman	Voorheesville, New York
44	Mike Allison	Forward/Center	6–9	215	Senior	Lynden, Ontario, Canada

== Schedule ==
Date time, TV	Opponent	Result	Record	Site (attendance) city, state
Exhibition
10/27/2012*; 7:00 PM	Laval	W 82–39		Alfond Arena; Orono, ME
11/03/2012*; 11:30 AM	Acadia	W 73–40		Memorial Gymnasium; Orono, ME
Regular season
11/10/2012*; 7:00 PM	at Dartmouth	L 54–67	0–1	Leede Arena (812); Hanover, NH
11/14/2012*; 7:00 PM	at Holy Cross	L 54–57	0–2	Hart Center (1,327); Worcester, MA
11/17/2012*; 7:00 PM	Brown	L 68–70	0–3	Alfond Arena (N/A); Orono, ME
11/21/2012*; 7:00 PM	at Seton Hall	L 49–76	0–4	Prudential Center (5,876); Newark, NJ
11/25/2012*; 2:00 PM	Siena	W 72–66	1–4	Alfond Arena (975); Orono, ME
11/28/2012*; 7:00 PM	at Northeastern	W 76–73	2–4	Matthews Arena (724); Boston, MA
12/01/2012*; 2:00 PM	at Duquesne	L 73–87	2–5	Palumbo Center (2,689); Pittsburgh, PA
12/06/2012*; 7:00 PM	Fisher	W 97–42	3–5	Memorial Gymnasium (1,103); Orono, ME
12/09/2012*; 4:00 PM, ESPNU	at Florida State	L 59–91	3–6	Donald L. Tucker Center (5,725); Tallahassee, Florida
12/14/2012*; 7:00 PM	at Army	L 67–96	3–7	Christl Arena (711); West Point, NY
12/16/2012*; 2:00 PM	at Marist	L 69–94	3–8	McCann Field House (1,021); Poughkeepsie, NY
12/22/2012*; 2:00 PM	Florida Gulf Coast	W 84–78	4–8	Alfond Arena (980); Orono, ME
12/29/2012*; 3:00 PM	at Quinnipiac	W 76–71	5–8	TD Bank Sports Center (1,802); Hamden, CT
01/02/2013; 7:00 PM	Boston University	W 63–58	6–8 (1–0)	Alfond Arena (950); Orono, ME
01/05/2013; 12:00 PM	UMBC	W 81–66	7–8 (2–0)	Alfond Arena (1,058); Orono, ME
01/09/2013; 12:00 PM	at Hartford	L 61–68	7–9 (2–1)	Chase Arena at Reich Family Pavilion (2,811); West Hartford, CT
01/12/2013; 7:30 PM	at Albany	L 63–76	7–10 (2–2)	SEFCU Arena (2,949); Albany, NY
01/19/2013; 2:00 PM	Binghamton	L 56–57	7–11 (2–3)	Memorial Gymnasium (1,273); Orono, ME
01/22/2013; 7:00 PM, ESPN3	Vermont	W 71–68	8–11 (3–3)	Alfond Arena (2,265); Orono, ME
01/26/2013; 2:00 PM	Stony Brook	L 69–79	8–12 (3–4)	Pritchard Gymnasium (1,630); Stony Brook, NY
01/30/2013; 7:30 PM	New Hampshire	L 54–57	8–13 (3–5)	Alfond Arena (1,299); Orono, ME
02/02/2013; 7:00 PM	at UMBC	L 67–68	8–14 (3–6)	Retriever Activities Center (1,255); Catonsville, MD
02/05/2013; 7:00 PM	at Boston University	L 72–79	8–15 (3–7)	Case Gym (425); Boston, MA
02/09/2013; 3:00 PM	Albany	W 66–52	9–15 (4–7)	Alfond Arena (1,139); Orono, ME
02/13/2013; 7:30 PM	Hartford	W 66–64	10–15 (5–7)	Alfond Arena (1,004); Orono, ME
02/16/2013; 7:00 PM	at Binghamton	W 64–60	11–15 (6–7)	Binghamton University Events Center (3,362); Vestal, NY
02/20/2013; 7:00 PM, ESPN3	at Vermont	L 61–73	11–16 (6–8)	Patrick Gym (2,205); Burlington, VT
02/24/2013; 1:00 PM	Stony Brook	L 53–69	11–17 (6–9)	Alfond Arena (1,282); Orono, ME
03/03/2013; 1:00 PM	at New Hampshire	L 74–79	11–18 (6–10)	Lundholm Gym (1,105); Durham, NH
2013 America East tournament
03/09/2013; 8:00 PM, ESPN3	at Albany; Quarterfinals	L 49–50	11–19	SEFCU Arena (N/A); Albany, NY
*Non-conference game. ^{#}Rankings from AP Poll. (#) Tournament seedings in parentheses. All times are in Eastern Time.
