= 2012–13 New Hampshire Wildcats men's basketball team =

American college basketball season

2012–13 New Hampshire Wildcats men's basketball
- Conference: America East Conference
- Record: 9–20 (5–11 America East)
- Head coach: Bill Herrion (8th season)
- Assistant coaches: Chris Mohr; Kenneth Dempsey; Marc Kuntz
- Home arena: Lundholm Gym

2012–13 America East men's basketball standings
	Conf.				Overall
Team	W		L	PCT	W		L	PCT
Stony Brook	14	–	2	.875	25	–	8	.758
Vermont	11	–	5	.688	21	–	12	.636
Boston University*	11	–	5	.688	17	–	13	.567
Hartford	10	–	6	.625	17	–	14	.548
Albany †	9	–	7	.563	24	–	11	.686
Maine	6	–	10	.375	11	–	19	.367
New Hampshire	5	–	11	.313	9	–	20	.310
UMBC	5	–	11	.313	8	–	23	.258
Binghamton	1	–	15	.063	3	–	27	.100
† 2013 America East tournament winner As of March 22, 2013; Rankings from AP Poll; *Ineligible for conference tournament due to changing conferences in 2013

The 2012–13 New Hampshire Wildcats men's basketball team represented the University of New Hampshire during the 2012–13 NCAA Division I men's basketball season. The Wildcats, led by eighth-year-head-coach Bill Herrion, played their home-games at Lundholm Gym and were members of the America East Conference. They finished the season 9–20, 5–11 in American East play to finish in a tie for sixth place.

They lost in the quarterfinals of the American East tournament to Vermont.

== Roster ==
Number	Name	Position	Height	Weight	Year	Hometown
1	Garrett Jones	Guard	6–0	185	Sophomore	Chicago, Illinois
2	Chris Orozco	Guard	6–3	175	Freshman	Tenafly, New Jersey
3	Chandler Rhoads	Guard	6–4	195	Senior	Berryville, Virginia
5	Jordon Bronner	Guard	6–0	170	Junior	Sleepy Hollow, New York
10	Logan Mortenson	Forward	6–7	210	Freshman	South Jordan, Utah
11	Tommy McDonnell	Guard	6–3	175	Sophomore	Durham, North Carolina
12	Frank Okeke	Forward	6–6	220	Freshman	DeSoto, Texas
14	Patrick Konan	Forward	6–6	220	Junior	Gainesville, Florida
15	Ferg Myrick	Forward	6–6	210	Senior	Philadelphia, Pennsylvania
22	Scott Morris	Guard	6–2	200	Junior	Walkersville, Maryland
23	Matt Miller	Guard	6–4	185	Junior	Arnold, Maryland
33	Chris Matagrano	Center	6–9	235	Senior	Sayreville, New Jersey
35	Jeron Trotman	Forward	6–6	220	Senior	Huntsville, Alabama
44	Chris Pelcher	Center	6–10	240	Junior	Albany, New York

== Schedule ==
Date time, TV	Opponent	Result	Record	Site (attendance) city, state
Regular season
11/10/2012*; 1:00 pm	Suffolk	W 91–51	1–0	Lundholm Gym (667); Durham, NH
11/13/2012*; 7:00 pm	at Dartmouth	W 72–58	2–0	Leede Arena (642); Hanover, NH
11/17/2012*; 1:00 pm	at Bryant	L 64–76	2–1	Chace Athletic Center (812); Smithfield, RI
11/21/2012*; 7:30 pm	at NJIT	L 67–69	2–2	Fleisher Center (301); Newark, NJ
11/24/2012*; 4:00 pm	at Holy Cross	L 50–60	2–3	Hart Center (N/A); Worcester, MA
11/29/2012*; 7:00 pm, ESPN3	at Connecticut	L 53–61	2–4	XL Center (8,705); Hartford, CT
12/01/2012*; 1:00 pm	Brown	W 63–50	3–4	Lundholm Gym (602); Durham, NH
12/05/2012*; 7:30 pm	Central Connecticut	L 84–87	3–5	Lundholm Gym (613); Durham, NH
12/08/2012*; 1:00 pm	Yale	W 64–56	4–5	Lundholm Gym (653); Durham, NH
12/16/2012*; 1:00 pm, ESPN3	at Boston College	L 59–61 ^{OT}	4–6	Conte Forum (2,163); Chestnut Hill, MA
12/23/2012*; 11:00 am, BTN	at Penn State	L 45–72	4–7	Bryce Jordan Center (N/A); University Park, PA
12/30/2012*; 2:00 pm	at Colgate	L 63–65	4–8	Cotterell Court (237); Hamilton, NY
01/02/2013; 7:00 pm	Vermont	L 51–64	4–9 (0–1)	Lundholm Gym (629); Durham, NH
01/05/2013; 2:00 pm	at Stony Brook	L 49–65	4–10 (0–2)	Pritchard Gymnasium (1,630); Stony Brook, NY
01/09/2013; 7:00 pm	at UMBC	L 57–68	4–11 (0–3)	Retriever Activities Center (1,152); Catonsville, MD
01/16/2013; 7:00 pm	Albany	L 62–68	4–12 (0–4)	Lundholm Gym (578); Durham, NH
01/19/2013; 4:30 pm, WBIN, FCS	Boston University	L 59–69	4–13 (0–5)	Lundholm Gym (764); Durham, NH
01/24/2013; 7:00 pm, ESPN3	Hartford	L 40–51	4–14 (0–6)	Lundholm Gym (N/A); Durham, NH
01/26/2013; 7:00 pm, TWCS	at Binghamton	W 63–45	5–14 (1–6)	Binghamton University Events Center (4,203); Vestal, NY
01/30/2013; 7:30 pm	at Maine	W 57–54	6–14 (2–6)	Alfond Arena (1,299); Orono, ME
02/02/2013; 4:00 pm	Stony Brook	L 54–56	6–15 (2–7)	Lundholm Gym (912); Durham, NH
02/06/2013; 7:00 pm	at Vermont	L 48–63	6–16 (2–8)	Patrick Gym (2,085); Burlington, VT
02/13/2013; 7:00 pm	UMBC	W 92–86 ^{OT}	7–16 (3–8)	Lundholm Gym (569); Durham, NH
02/17/2013; 1:00 pm	at Boston University	L 56–68	7–17 (3–9)	Case Gym (483); Boston, MA
02/20/2013; 7:00 pm	at Hartford	L 44–49	7–18 (3–10)	Chase Arena at Reich Family Pavilion (2,263); West Hartford, CT
02/23/2013; 5:00 pm, WBIN, FCS	Binghamton	W 68–56	8–18 (4–10)	Lundholm Gym (N/A); Durham, NH
02/28/2013; 7:00 pm	at Albany	L 49–56	8–19 (4–11)	SEFCU Arena (N/A); Albany, NY
03/03/2013; 1:00 pm	Maine	W 79–74	9–19 (5–11)	Lundholm Gym (1,105); Durham, NH
2013 America East tournament
03/09/2013; 12:00 pm, ESPN3	vs. Vermont; Quarterfinals	L 42–61	9–20	SEFCU Arena (N/A); Albany, NY
*Non-conference game. ^{#}Rankings from AP Poll. (#) Tournament seedings in parentheses. All times are in Eastern Time.
