= 2012–13 Albany Great Danes men's basketball team =

American college basketball season

2012–13 Albany Great Danes men's basketball

America East tournament champions

NCAA Tournament, Round of 64
- Conference: America East Conference
- Record: 24–11 (9–7 America East)
- Head coach: Will Brown (12th season)
- Assistant coaches: Jeremy Friel; Chad O'Donnell; Brent Wilson
- Home arena: SEFCU Arena

2012–13 America East men's basketball standings
	Conf.				Overall
Team	W		L	PCT	W		L	PCT
Stony Brook	14	–	2	.875	25	–	8	.758
Vermont	11	–	5	.688	21	–	12	.636
Boston University*	11	–	5	.688	17	–	13	.567
Hartford	10	–	6	.625	17	–	14	.548
Albany †	9	–	7	.563	24	–	11	.686
Maine	6	–	10	.375	11	–	19	.367
New Hampshire	5	–	11	.313	9	–	20	.310
UMBC	5	–	11	.313	8	–	23	.258
Binghamton	1	–	15	.063	3	–	27	.100
† 2013 America East tournament winner As of March 22, 2013; Rankings from AP Poll; *Ineligible for conference tournament due to changing conferences in 2013

The 2012–13 Albany Great Danes men's basketball team represented the University at Albany, SUNY during the 2012–13 NCAA Division I men's basketball season. The Great Danes, led by 12th year head coach Will Brown, played their home games at SEFCU Arena and were members of the America East Conference. They finished the season 24–11, 9–7 in America East play to finish in fifth place. They were champions of the America East tournament, winning the championship over Vermont, to earn an automatic bid to the 2013 NCAA tournament where they lost in the second round to Duke.

== Roster ==
2012–13 Albany Great Danes men's basketball team
Players
Coaches

Pos.	#	Name	Height	Weight	Year	Hometown
G	0	Jacob Iati	5 ft 10 in (1.78 m)	165 lb (75 kg)	Sr	York, Pennsylvania
G	1	Tanner Gibson	6 ft 2 in (1.88 m)	185 lb (84 kg)	So	Zanesville, Ohio
G	3	D. J. Evans	5 ft 9 in (1.75 m)	175 lb (79 kg)	Jr	Brandon, Mississippi
G	10	Mike Black	6 ft 0 in (1.83 m)	180 lb (82 kg)	Sr	Chicago, Illinois
F	11	Luke Devlin	6 ft 8 in (2.03 m)	235 lb (107 kg)	Jr	Sydney, Australia
G	12	Peter Hooley	6 ft 4 in (1.93 m)	200 lb (91 kg)	RS Fr	Hahndorf, South Australia
F	14	Sam Rowley	6 ft 6 in (1.98 m)	200 lb (91 kg)	So	Sydney, Australia
F	20	Gary Johnson	6 ft 6 in (1.98 m)	200 lb (91 kg)	Jr	Moreno Valley, California
C	21	Blake Metcalf	6 ft 9 in (2.06 m)	235 lb (107 kg)	Sr	Camby, Indiana
F	22	Dave Wiegmann	6 ft 8 in (2.03 m)	210 lb (95 kg)	Jr	Breese, Illinois
G	24	Chris Page	6 ft 5 in (1.96 m)	190 lb (86 kg)	RS Fr	Plainfield, Indiana
G/F	30	Jayson Guerrier	6 ft 4 in (1.93 m)	210 lb (95 kg)	Sr	Winter Springs, Florida
C	44	John Puk	6 ft 10 in (2.08 m)	235 lb (107 kg)	Jr	Waterloo, Iowa

Head coach

- Will Brown

Assistant coach(es)

- Chad O'Donnell
- Jeremy Friel
- Jon Iati

Legend

- (C) Team captain
- (S) Suspended
- (I) Ineligible
- (W) Walk-on
- Injured
- Current redshirt

Roster

== Schedule ==
Date time, TV	Rank^{#}	Opponent^{#}	Result	Record	Site (attendance) city, state
Regular Season
11/09/2012*; 6:30 pm		Duquesne	W 69–66	1–0	SEFCU Arena (N/A); Albany, NY
11/11/2012*; 2:00 pm		at No. 4 Ohio State; Basketball Hall of Fame Tip-Off	L 60–82	1–1	Value City Arena (13,497); Columbus, OH
11/13/2012*; 11:30 pm, P12N		at Washington; Basketball Hall of Fame Tip-Off	W 63–62	2–1	Alaska Airlines Arena (7,041); Seattle, WA
11/17/2012*; 2:30 pm		vs. UMKC; Basketball Hall of Fame Tip-Off	W 62–59	3–1	Mohegan Sun Arena (N/A); Uncasville, CT
11/18/2012*; 2:00 pm		vs. Loyola (MD); Basketball Hall of Fame Tip-Off	L 64–67	3–2	Mohegan Sun Arena (N/A); Uncasville, CT
11/20/2012*; 7:30 pm		at South Carolina State	W 83–55	4–2	SHM Memorial Center (N/A); Orangeburg, SC
11/26/2012*; 7:00 pm		Wagner	W 66–63	5–2	SEFCU Arena (2,256); Albany, NY
12/01/2012*; 7:30 pm		at Siena	W 69–56	6–2	Times Union Center (10,229); Albany, NY
12/05/2012*; 7:00 pm		St. Francis Brooklyn	W 77–73	7–2	SEFCU Arena (2,542); Albany, NY
12/08/2012*; 2:00 pm		at Colgate	W 67–61	8–2	Cotterell Court (N/A); Hamilton, NY
12/12/2012*; 7:00 pm		South Carolina State	W 70–61	9–2	SEFCU Arena (2,371); Albany, NY
12/21/2012*; 7:00 pm		Quinnipiac	L 57–59	9–3	SEFCU Arena (2,146); Albany, NY
12/28/2012*; 7:00 pm		at Navy	W 71–61	10–3	Alumni Hall (2,431); Annapolis, MD
12/31/2012*; 4:00 pm		Brown	W 57–50	11–3	SEFCU Arena (2,432); Albany, NY
01/02/2013; 7:00 pm		UMBC	W 65–48	12–3 (1–0)	SEFCU Arena (1,821); Albany, NY
01/05/2013; 2:00 pm		at Vermont	L 45–70	12–4 (1–1)	Patrick Gym (2,311); Burlington, VT
01/07/2013; 7:00 pm, TWCS		at Binghamton	W 71–59	13–4 (2–1)	Binghamton University Events Center (1,864); Vestal, NY
01/12/2013; 7:30 pm		Maine	W 76–63	14–4 (3–1)	SEFCU Arena (2,949); Albany, NY
01/16/2013; 7:00 pm		at New Hampshire	W 68–62	15–4 (4–1)	Lundholm Gym (578); Durham, NH
01/19/2013; 7:00 pm		at Hartford	W 56–46	16–4 (5–1)	Chase Arena at Reich Family Pavilion (1,996); Hartford, CT
01/23/2013; 7:00 pm		Boston University	L 80–85 ^{OT}	16–5 (5–2)	SEFCU Arena (3,685); Albany, NY
01/26/2013; 7:30 pm, ESPN3		Vermont	L 43–50	16–6 (5–3)	SEFCU Arena (4,182); Albany, NY
01/29/2013; 7:00 pm, ESPN3		Stony Brook	L 49–65	16–7 (5–4)	SEFCU Arena (N/A); Albany, NY
02/02/2013; 7:30 pm		Binghamton	W 79–46	17–7 (6–4)	SEFCU Arena (4,392); Albany, NY
02/06/2013; 7:00 pm		at UMBC	W 79–56	18–7 (7–4)	Retriever Activities Center (1,707); Catonsville, MD
02/09/2013; 3:00 pm		at Maine	L 52–66	18–8 (7–5)	Alfond Arena (1,139); Orono, ME
02/16/2013; 7:00 pm		Hartford	W 75–49	19–8 (8–5)	SEFCU Arena (2,906); Albany, NY
02/20/2013; 7:00 pm		at Boston University	L 69–79	19–9 (8–6)	Case Gym (712); Boston, MA
02/23/2013*; 1:00 pm		at Fairfield; BracketBusters	W 58–50	20–9	Webster Bank Arena (3,678); Bridgeport, CT
02/28/2013; 7:00 pm		New Hampshire	W 56–49	21–9 (9–6)	SEFCU Arena (N/A); Albany, NY
03/03/2013; 2:00 pm, ESPN3		at Stony Brook	L 70–75	21–10 (9–7)	Pritchard Gymnasium (1,630); Stony Brook, NY
America East tournament
03/09/2013; 8:00 pm, ESPN3		Maine; Quarterfinals	W 50–49	22–10	SEFCU Arena (N/A); Albany, NY
03/10/2013; 7:30 pm, ESPN3		Stony Brook; Semifinals	W 61–59	23–10	SEFCU Arena (N/A); Albany, NY
03/16/2013; 11:30 am, ESPN2		at Vermont; Championship Game	W 53–49	24–10	Patrick Gym (3,266); Burlington, VT
NCAA Tournament
03/22/2013*; 12:15 pm, CBS	No. (15 MW)	vs. No. 6 (2 MW) Duke; Second Round	L 61–73	24–11	Wells Fargo Center (20,125); Philadelphia, PA
*Non-conference game. ^{#}Rankings from AP Poll. (#) Tournament seedings in parentheses. All times are in Eastern Time. (#) during NCAA Tournament is seed with Region MW=Midwest.
