= Jamar Wilson =

American-Finnish basketball player

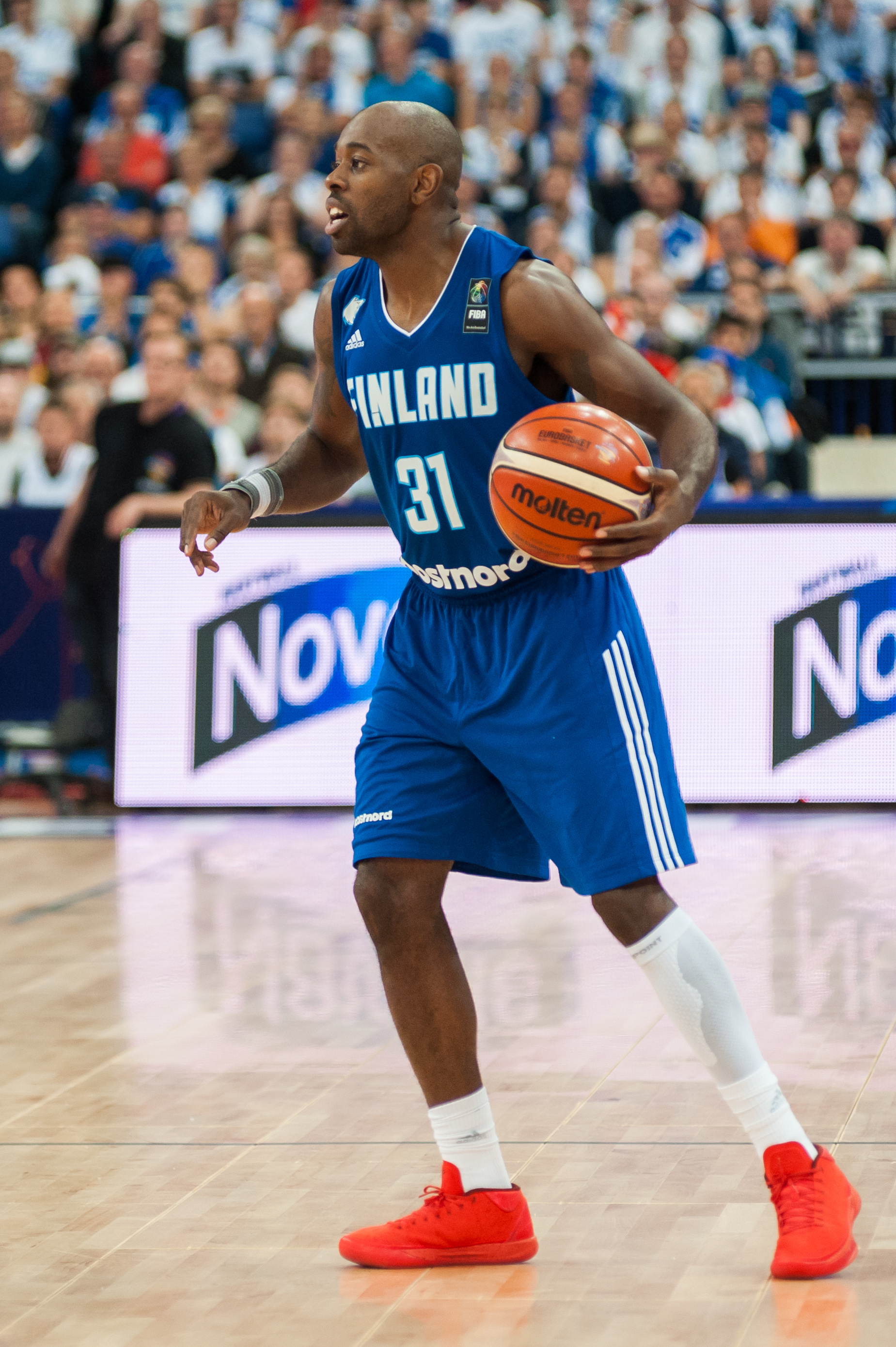
- Wilson with the Finland national team in 2017

Personal information
- Born: February 22, 1984 (age 42) Bronx, New York, U.S.
- Listed height: 6 ft 1 in (1.85 m)
- Listed weight: 185 lb (84 kg)

Career information
- High school: All Hallows (Bronx, New York); Our Savior New American School (Centereach, New York)
- College: Albany (2002–2007)
- NBA draft: 2007: undrafted
- Playing career: 2007–2022
- Position: Point guard

Career history
- 2007–2008: Wolves Verviers-Pepinster
- 2008–2009: Liège
- 2009–2010: Okapi Aalstar
- 2010–2011: Honka Playboys
- 2011–2014: Cairns Taipans
- 2014–2015: Adelaide 36ers
- 2015: SPO Rouen
- 2015–2016: Partizan
- 2016–2017: Estudiantes
- 2017–2018: Nanterre 92
- 2018–2019: BC Lietkabelis
- 2019–2020: JL Bourg
- 2020–2022: Kataja Basket
- 2022: Boulazac Basket Dordogne

Career highlights
- 2× All-NBL Second Team (2012, 2015); All-NBL Third Team (2013); VTB United League scoring champion (2011); 2× America East Player of the Year (2006, 2007); 2× First-team All-America East (2006, 2007); 2× Second-team All-America East (2003, 2004); America East Rookie of the Year (2003); America East All-Rookie Team (2003); 2× America East tournament MVP (2006, 2007); No. 31 retired by Albany Great Danes

Jamar J. Wilson (born February 22, 1984) is an American-Finnish basketball executive and former professional basketball player. He last played for Boulazac Basket Dordogne of the LNB Pro B. Since May 2026 he has served as 3x3 director at the Finnish Basketball Association, leading the development of 3x3 basketball in Finland.

== High school career ==
Wilson attended All Hallows High School in Bronx, New York for two years before transferring to Our Savior New American School in Centereach, New York. As a senior, he averaged 14.2 points, 5.1 assists, 2.6 rebounds and 1.9 steals per game as he led Pioneers to a 25–11 record and the 2002 NACA Division I Boys Basketball National Championship.

== College career ==
Wilson played college basketball at Albany from 2002 to 2007. He made an immediate impact, as he was named the America East Conference rookie of the year and second-team All-Conference as a freshman after averaging 18.9 points and 3.3 assists per game. After a medical redshirt in the 2003–04 season, Wilson came back to again make the All-Conference second team.

For the next two seasons, Wilson took his game to another level and led the Great Danes to their first two NCAA Division I tournament appearances. Wilson was named first team All-Conference both years and was named America East Conference player of the year in each of his last two seasons. Wilson also raised his level of play in the America East tournament, earning tournament MVP honors both years. Wilson was also named an honorable mention All-American by the Associated Press both seasons.

Wilson scored 2,164 points in his Albany career – the most in school history. He also set school records in points in a season (620 his senior year), career free throws (601), and finished second all-time in assists (488). He is the first player in school history to have his jersey retired.

== Professional career ==
=== Belgium (2007–2010) ===
In August 2007, Wilson signed with VOO Wolves Verviers-Pepinster of Belgium for the 2007–08 season. In 27 games for Verviers-Pepinster, he averaged 17.6 points, 2.2 rebounds, 3.0 assists and 1.3 steals per game.

In August 2008, Wilson signed with Belgacom Liège Basket for the 2008–09 season. In 30 league games for Liège, he averaged 9.8 points, 2.6 rebounds, 2.9 assists and 1.0 steals per game.

In September 2009, Wilson signed with Generali Okapi Aalstar for the 2009–10 season. In 28 league games for Aalstar, he averaged 12.3 points, 1.8 rebounds, 2.6 assists and 1.4 steals per game.

=== Finland (2010–2011) ===
In September 2010, Wilson signed with Honka Espoo Playboys of Finland's Korisliiga for the 2010–11 season. In a game against Namika Lahti in January 2011, Wilson scored 45 points, and two days later, scored 44 points against Helsinki. In 42 games for Honka, he averaged 21.8 points, 4.0 rebounds, 3.3 assists and 1.1 steals per game.

=== Australia (2011–2015) ===
On August 5, 2011, Wilson signed with the Cairns Taipans for the 2011–12 NBL season. He was named player of the week twice and finished second in the MVP voting.

On April 3, 2012, Wilson re-signed with the Taipans on a two-year deal.

On March 1, 2014, Wilson recorded a career-high 33 points, along with 8 rebounds and 6 assists, in a 92–87 win over the New Zealand Breakers.

In April 2014, it was announced that Wilson would not re-sign with the Taipans for 2014–15.

On July 8, 2014, Wilson signed a one-year deal with the Adelaide 36ers. On January 13, 2015, he was named Player of the Week for Round 14 after scoring an equal game-high 22 points against Melbourne United on January 10. He went on to win Round 17 Player of the Week honors as well after scoring a game-high 25 points against the Townsville Crocodiles on February 1. After earning All-NBL second team honors for the 2014–15 season, Wilson was named the recipient of the Mark Davis Trophy as the 2015 Adelaide 36ers club MVP.

In 107 NBL games over four seasons, Wilson averaged 16.6 points, 4.7 rebounds and 3.1 assists per game.

=== Rouen Basket (2015) ===
On March 12, 2015, Wilson signed with French team SPO Rouen Basket for the rest of the 2014–15 LNB Pro A season. In eight games for Rouen, he averaged 9.5 points, 2.8 rebounds and 2.3 assists per game.

=== Partizan (2015–2016) ===
On November 7, 2015, Wilson signed with Serbian team Partizan Belgrade for the rest of the 2015–16 season.

=== Estudiantes (2016–2017) ===
On August 1, 2016, Wilson signed with Estudiantes of Spain for the 2016–17 ACB season.

=== Nanterre 92 (2017–2018) ===
On November 7, 2017, Wilson signed with Nanterre 92 for the 2017–18 season.

=== BC Lietkabelis (2018–2019) ===
On August 2, 2018, he signed with BC Lietkabelis of the Lithuanian Basketball League.

=== JL Bourg (2019–2020) ===
On June 12, 2019, he has signed with JL Bourg of the LNB Pro A.

=== Kataja BC (2020–2022) ===
On February 18, 2020, Wilson signed with Kataja BC of the Finnish league.

=== Boulazac Basket (2022–present) ===
On March 22, 2022, he has signed with Boulazac Basket Dordogne of the LNB Pro B.

== National team career ==
Wilson never received an invitation to play for the United States national team. After having received Finnish citizenship, he immediately became a potential candidate to be a member of the Finnish national team. He made his international debut for Finland on August 1, 2015, in a friendly match against France.

Wilson was a member of the Finnish national team at EuroBasket 2015. On September 5, 2015, he debuted for the team in a 97–87 overtime loss to France in Round 1, scoring a team-high 21 points. In the fourth match of the group stage against Bosnia and Herzegovina, Finland won 88–59 behind Wilson's team-high 16 points. Over five tournament games, Wilson averaged 12.0 points, 1.6 rebounds and 2.8 assists per game.

== Personal life ==
Wilson is the son of Bobby Livingston and Carolyn Wilson. His cousin, Dyree Wilson, was a two-time All-Metro Atlantic Athletic Conference selection at Iona College in 2000 and 2001, and his uncle, James "Pookie" Wilson, was a notable street baller in the Bronx.

Wilson and his wife, former Finland national team player Laura Wilson (née Sario) have a daughter named Fiona. They had met earlier when the both were playing college basketball in the United States. Six months after passing the language test, Wilson received his Finnish passport in June 2015, about five years after his first public intentions to gain Finnish citizenship.

== Career statistics ==
=== National team ===
| Team | Tournament | Pos. | GP | PPG | RPG | APG |
|---|---|---|---|---|---|---|
| Finland | EuroBasket 2015 | 16th | 5 | 12.0 | 1.6 | 2.8 |
| Finland | EuroBasket 2017 | 11th | 4 | 6.3 | 1.5 | 3.3 |

== See also ==
- List of foreign basketball players in Serbia
