= 2012–13 Colonial Athletic Association men's basketball season =

- League: NCAA Division I
- Sport: Basketball
- Duration: November, 2012 – March, 2013
- Teams: 11 (8 playoff eligible)

Regular Season
- Champion: Northeastern
- Runners-up: Towson
- Season MVP: Jerrelle Benimon (Towson)
- Top scorer: Devon Saddler (Delaware)

Tournament
- Champions: James Madison
- Runners-up: Northeastern
- Finals MVP: A.J. Davis (James Madison)

CAA men's basketball seasons
- ← 2011–12 2013–14 , →

2012–13 CAA men's basketball standings
	Conf.				Overall
Team	W		L	PCT	W		L	PCT
Northeastern	14	–	4	.778	20	–	13	.606
Towson*	13	–	5	.722	18	–	13	.581
Delaware	13	–	5	.722	19	–	14	.576
James Madison †	11	–	7	.611	21	–	15	.583
George Mason	10	–	8	.556	22	–	16	.579
Georgia State**	10	–	8	.556	15	–	16	.484
Drexel	9	–	9	.500	13	–	18	.419
William & Mary	7	–	11	.389	13	–	17	.433
UNC Wilmington*	5	–	13	.278	10	–	20	.333
Hofstra	4	–	14	.222	7	–	25	.219
Old Dominion**	3	–	15	.167	5	–	25	.167
† 2013 CAA tournament winner Rankings from AP poll *Ineligible for postseason play due to APR penalties **Ineligible for conference tournament due to changing conferences in 2013

The 2012–13 CAA men's basketball season marked the 28th season of Colonial Athletic Association men's basketball, taking place between November 2012 and March 2013. Practices commenced in October 2012, and the season ended with the 2013 CAA men's basketball tournament.

== Preseason ==
=== Preseason poll ===
Rank	Team
1	Drexel
2	Delaware
3	George Mason
4	Old Dominion
5	Northeastern
6	James Madison
7	Hofstra
8	Georgia State
9	William & Mary
10	Towson
11	UNC Wilimgton

=== Preseason All-Conference Teams ===
Award	Recipients
First Team	Jamelle Hagins (Delaware) Damion Lee (Drexel); Jonathan Lee (Northeastern); Frantz Massenat (Drexel); Keith Rendleman (UNC Wilmington); Devon Saddler (Delaware)
Second Team	A.J. Davis (James Madison) Quincy Ford (Northeastern); Marcus Thornton (William & Mary); Devonta White (Georgia State); Sherrod Wright (George Mason)

CAA Preseason Player of the Year: Frantz Massenat, Drexel

== Regular season ==
=== Head coaches ===
- Monté Ross, Delaware
- Bruiser Flint, Drexel
- Paul Hewitt, George Mason
- Ron Hunter, Georgia State
- Mo Cassara, Hofstra
- Matt Brady, James Madison
- Bill Coen, Northeastern
- Blaine Taylor (Note: Taylor was relieved of his duties after a 2–20 start through the first 22 games of the season. Assistant coach Jim Corrigan became the interim head coach for the last 8 games, finishing 3–5.), Old Dominion
- Pat Skerry, Towson
- Buzz Peterson, UNC Wilmington
- Tony Shaver, William & Mary

=== Rankings ===
Legend
Increase in ranking
Decrease in ranking
Not ranked previous week

		Pre	Wk 2	Wk 3	Wk 4	Wk 5	Wk 6	Wk 7	Wk 8	Wk 9	Wk 10	Wk 11	Wk 12	Wk 13	Wk 14	Wk 15	Wk 16	Wk 17	Wk 18	Wk 19	Final
Delaware	AP																				
Delaware	C																				
Drexel	AP	RV																			
Drexel	C	RV																			
George Mason	AP																				
George Mason	C																				
Georgia State	AP																				
Georgia State	C																				
Hofstra	AP																				
Hofstra	C																				
James Madison	AP																				
James Madison	C																				
Northeastern	AP																				
Northeastern	C																				
Old Dominion	AP																				
Old Dominion	C																				
Towson	AP																				
Towson	C																				
UNC Wilmington	AP																				
UNC Wilmington	C																				
William & Mary	AP																				
William & Mary	C																				

== Postseason ==
=== Conference tournament ===
- March 9–11, 2013: Colonial Athletic Association Men's Basketball Tournament, Richmond Coliseum, Richmond, Virginia

James Madison defeated Northeastern, 70–57, in the finals of the 2013 CAA tournament to win the conference, and earn an automatic bid to the 2013 NCAA Division I men's basketball tournament.

==== Bracket ====
Quarterfinals; Saturday, March 9
4	George Mason	60
5	Drexel	54
2	Delaware	62
7	Hofstra	57
3	James Madison	72
6	William & Mary	67

Semifinals; Sunday, March 10
1	Northeastern	69
4	George Mason	67
2	Delaware	57
3	James Madison	58

Championship; Monday, March 11
1	Northeastern	57
3	James Madison	70

=== NCAA tournament ===
The CAA had one bid to the NCAA Division I tournament, that being the automatic bid of James Madison.

Seed	Region	School	First Four	Round of 64	Round of 32	Sweet 16	Elite Eight	Final Four	Championship
16	East	James Madison	W vs. (16) Long Island 68–55	L vs. (1) Indiana 62–83					
	Bids	W-L (%):	1–0 1.000	0–1 .000	0–0 –	0–0 –	0–0 –	0–0 –	TOTAL: 1–1 .500

=== National Invitation tournament ===
Northeastern automatically qualified for the 2013 National Invitation Tournament.

Seed	Region	School	First Round	Second Round	Quarterfinals	Semifinals	Championship
8	Alabama	Northeastern	L vs. (1) Alabama 43–62				
	Bids	W-L (%):	0–1 .000	0–0 –	0–0 –	0–0 –	TOTAL: 0–1 .000

=== College Basketball Invitational ===
George Mason was invited to play in the 2013 College Basketball Invitational.

School	First Round	Quarterfinals	Semifinals	Finals Game 1	Finals Game 2	Finals Game 3
George Mason	W vs. Charleston 78–77	W vs. Houston 88–84^{OT}	W vs. Western Michigan 62–52	L vs. Santa Clara, 73–81	W vs. Santa Clara, 73–66	L vs. Santa Clara, 77–80
W-L (%):	1–0 1.000	1–0 1.000	1–0 1.000	0–1 .000	1–0 1.000	TOTAL: 4–2 .667

=== CollegeInsider.com Postseason tournament ===
No teams from the CAA were invited to play in the 2013 CollegeInsider.com Postseason Tournament.

== Awards and honors ==
=== Postseason ===
==== CAA All-Conference Teams and Awards ====
Award	Recipients
Coach of the Year	Pat Skerry (Towson)
Player of the Year	Jerrelle Benimon (Towson)
Defensive Player of the Year	Jamelle Hagins (Delaware)
Rookie of the Year	R. J. Hunter (Georgia State)
Dean Ehlers Leadership Award	Jonathan Lee (Northeastern)
First Team	Jerrelle Benimon (Towson); R. J. Hunter (Georgia State); Keith Rendleman (UNC Wilmington); Devon Saddler (Delaware); Joel Smith (Northeastern)
Second Team	Jamelle Hagins (Delaware); Damion Lee (Drexel); Frantz Massenat (Drexel); Marcus Thornton (William & Mary); Sherrod Wright (George Mason)
Third Team	Quincy Ford (Northeastern); Rayshawn Goins (James Madison); Jonathan Lee (Northeastern); Devon Moore (James Madison); Tim Rusthoven (William & Mary); Jarvis Threatt (Delaware)
All-Defensive Team	Jerrelle Benimon (Towson); Jamelle Hagins (Delaware); Stevie Mejia (Hofstra); Keith Rendleman (UNC Wilmington); James Vincent (Georgia State)
All-Rookie Team	Jerome Hairston (Towson); R. J. Hunter (Georgia State); Andre Nation (James Madison); Keenan Palmore (Old Dominion); David Walker (Northeastern)
All-Academic First Team	Kyle Anderson (Delaware); Kyle Gaillard (William & Mary); Donte Hill (Old Dominion); Shane Reybold (UNC Wilmington); Tim Rusthoven (William & Mary)
All-Academic Second Team	Brandon Britt (William & Mary); Daquan Brown (Hofstra); Jonathan Lee (Northeastern); Tanner Milson (UNC Wilmington); Kris Walden (Towson)
All-Tournament Team	Byron Allen (George Mason); A.J. Davis (James Madison); Rayshawn Goins (James Madison); Jamelle Hagins (Delaware); Jonathan Lee (Northeastern); Devon Moore (James Madison)
Tournament MVP	A.J. Davis (James Madison)
