= 2012–13 Old Dominion Monarchs basketball team =

American college basketball season

2012–13 Old Dominion Monarchs basketball
- Conference: Colonial Athletic Association
- Record: 5–25 (3–15 CAA)
- Head coach: Blaine Taylor (first 22 games, 12th year); Jim Corrigan (interim HC)
- Assistant coaches: Jim Corrigan; Robert Wilkes; John Richardson
- Home arena: Ted Constant Convocation Center

2012–13 CAA men's basketball standings
	Conf.				Overall
Team	W		L	PCT	W		L	PCT
Northeastern	14	–	4	.778	20	–	13	.606
Towson*	13	–	5	.722	18	–	13	.581
Delaware	13	–	5	.722	19	–	14	.576
James Madison †	11	–	7	.611	21	–	15	.583
George Mason	10	–	8	.556	22	–	16	.579
Georgia State**	10	–	8	.556	15	–	16	.484
Drexel	9	–	9	.500	13	–	18	.419
William & Mary	7	–	11	.389	13	–	17	.433
UNC Wilmington*	5	–	13	.278	10	–	20	.333
Hofstra	4	–	14	.222	7	–	25	.219
Old Dominion**	3	–	15	.167	5	–	25	.167
† 2013 CAA tournament winner Rankings from AP poll *Ineligible for postseason play due to APR penalties **Ineligible for conference tournament due to changing conferences in 2013

The 2012–13 Old Dominion Monarchs basketball team represented Old Dominion University during the 2012–13 NCAA Division I men's basketball season. The Monarchs, led by 12th year head coach Blaine Taylor, played their home games at Ted Constant Convocation Center and were members of the Colonial Athletic Association. This was their final season as a member of the CAA before joining Conference USA in July 2013. As a result of the conference change, the Monarchs were not eligible to participate in the 2013 CAA men's basketball tournament.

After a 2–20 start to the season, head coach Blaine Taylor was fired. Assistant coach Jim Corrigan was named the Monarchs interim head coach for the remainder of the season.

They finished the season 5–25, 3–15 in CAA play to finish in last place.

== Roster ==
Number	Name	Position	Height	Weight	Year	Hometown
1	Nick Wright	Forward	6–8	208	Senior	Suffolk, Virginia
2	Aaron Bacote	Guard	6–5	175	Freshman	Hampton, Virginia
3	Keenan Palmore	Guard	6–1	174	Freshman	Stone Mountain, Georgia
4	Dimitri Batten	Guard	6–3	190	Sophomore	Newport News, Virginia
10	Ambrose Mosley	Guard	6–1	166	Freshman	Jacksonville, Florida
11	DeShawn Painter	Center	6–9	235	Senior	Norfolk, Virginia
12	Ekene Anachebe	Center	6–9	265	Freshman	Fayetteville, Georgia
15	Deion Clark	Guard	6–3	198	Freshman	Naples, Florida
21	Stuart McEwen	Forward	6–9	201	Freshman	Sydney, Australia
23	Richard Ross	Forward	6–7	205	Sophomore	Wichita Falls, Texas
25	Donte Hill	Guard	6–4	205	Junior	Virginia Beach, Virginia
40	Anton Larsen	Forward/Center	7–0	240	Junior	Copenhagen, Denmark

== Schedule ==
Date time, TV	Opponent	Result	Record	Site (attendance) city, state
Exhibition
11/01/2012*; 7:00 pm	Mount Olive	W 102–65	–	Ted Constant Convocation Center (N/A); Norfolk, VA
11/05/2012*; 7:00 pm	Virginia State	W 95–51	–	Ted Constant Convocation Center (7,047); Norfolk, VA
Regular Season
11/09/2012*; 7:15 pm	Holy Cross; Liberty Tax Classic	L 45–46	0–1	Ted Constant Convocation Center (7,283); Norfolk, VA
11/10/2012*; 7:15 pm	Morgan State; Liberty Tax Classic	W 72–61	1–1	Ted Constant Convocation Center (6,993); Norfolk, VA
11/11/2012*; 2:00 pm, Cox/CSNMA	UTSA; Liberty Tax Classic	L 70–79	1–2	Ted Constant Convocation Center (6,233); Norfolk, VA
11/17/2012*; 2:00 pm	at Cleveland State	L 55–67	1–3	Wolstein Center (1,289); Cleveland, OH
11/21/2012*; 7:00 pm	VMI	L 71–76	1–4	Ted Constant Convocation Center (6,801); Norfolk, VA
11/24/2012*; 8:00 pm, ESPN3	at Murray State	L 72–79	1–5	CFSB Center (4,745); Murray, KY
12/01/2012; 7:00 pm	at William & Mary; Rivalry	L 62–71	1–6 (0–1)	William & Mary Hall (3,106); Williamsburg, VA
12/04/2012*; 7:00 pm, NBCSN	Richmond	L 53–80	1–7	Ted Constant Convocation Center (6,797); Norfolk, VA
12/07/2012*; 7:00 pm	VCU; Rivalry	L 70–83	1–8	Ted Constant Convocation Center (8,080); Norfolk, VA
12/14/2012*; 7:00 pm	UCF	L 71–75	1–9	Ted Constant Convocation Center (6,313); Norfolk, VA
12/18/2012*; 7:30 pm, ESPN3	at College of Charleston	L 65–76	1–10	TD Arena (3,418); Charleston, SC
12/22/2012*; 5:30 pm, NBCSN	vs. Virginia; Governor's Invitational	W 63–61	2–10	Richmond Coliseum (6,944); Richmond, VA
12/29/2012*; 7:00 pm	Fairfield	L 54–55	2–11	Ted Constant Convocation Center (6,032); Norfolk, VA
01/02/2013; 7:00 pm	James Madison; Rivalry	L 55–58	2–12 (0–2)	Ted Constant Convocation Center (6,094); Norfolk, VA
01/05/2013; 12:00 pm, CSNMA	Delaware	L 72–84	2–13 (0–3)	Ted Constant Convocation Center (6,126); Norfolk, VA
01/10/2013; 7:00 pm, NBCSN	at George Mason	L 46–71	2–14 (0–4)	Patriot Center (4,011); Fairfax, VA
01/16/2013; 7:00 pm	at UNC Wilmington	L 60–65	2–15 (0–5)	Trask Coliseum (3,832); Wilmington, NC
01/19/2013; 7:00 pm	Georgia State	L 54–69	2–16 (0–6)	Ted Constant Convocation Center (6,493); Norfolk, VA
01/26/2013; 4:00 pm, CSNMA	at James Madison; Rivalry	L 46–56	2–17 (0–7)	JMU Convocation Center (3,848); Harrisonburg, VA
01/30/2013; 7:00 pm	Towson	L 66–68	2–18 (0–8)	Ted Constant Convocation Center (5,971); Norfolk, VA
02/02/2013; 2:00 pm	at Georgia State	L 63–83	2–19 (0–9)	GSU Sports Arena (2,140); Atlanta, GA
02/04/2013; 7:00 pm, NBCSN	George Mason	L 74–85	2–20 (0–10)	Ted Constant Convocation Center (6,290); Norfolk, VA
02/07/2013; 7:00 pm, NBCSN	at Drexel	W 78–66	3–20 (1–10)	Daskalakis Athletic Center (1,953); Philadelphia, PA
02/09/2013; 4:00 pm, CSNMA	Northeastern	L 74–79 ^{OT}	3–21 (1–11)	Ted Constant Convocation Center (6,532); Norfolk, VA
02/11/2013; 7:00 pm, NBCSN	at Delaware	L 73–75	3–22 (1–12)	Bob Carpenter Center (2,357); Newark, DE
02/16/2013; 12:00 pm, CSNMA	William & Mary; Rivalry	L 62–74	3–23 (1–13)	Ted Constant Convocation Center (7,872); Norfolk, VA
02/20/2013; 7:00 pm	UNC Wilmington	W 84–61	4–23 (2–13)	Ted Constant Convocation Center (5,951); Norfolk, VA
02/24/2013; 7:00 pm, CSNMA	at Hofstra	L 59–70	4–24 (2–14)	Mack Sports Complex (1,626); Hempstead, NY
02/28/2013; 7:00 pm, NBCSN	Drexel	L 77–81	4–25 (2–15)	Ted Constant Convocation Center (6,474); Norfolk, VA
03/02/2013; 12:00 pm, CSNMA	at Northeastern	W 81–74	5–25 (3–15)	Matthews Arena (1,927); Boston, MA
*Non-conference game. ^{#}Rankings from AP Poll. (#) Tournament seedings in parentheses. All times are in Eastern Time.
