= 2012–13 Delaware Fightin' Blue Hens men's basketball team =

American college basketball season

2012–13 Delaware Fightin' Blue Hens men's basketball
- Conference: Colonial Athletic Association
- Record: 19–14 (13–5 CAA)
- Head coach: Monté Ross (7th season)
- Assistant coaches: Jeff Rafferty; Phil Martelli, Jr.; Chris Cheeks
- Home arena: Bob Carpenter Center

2012–13 CAA men's basketball standings
	Conf.				Overall
Team	W		L	PCT	W		L	PCT
Northeastern	14	–	4	.778	20	–	13	.606
Towson*	13	–	5	.722	18	–	13	.581
Delaware	13	–	5	.722	19	–	14	.576
James Madison †	11	–	7	.611	21	–	15	.583
George Mason	10	–	8	.556	22	–	16	.579
Georgia State**	10	–	8	.556	15	–	16	.484
Drexel	9	–	9	.500	13	–	18	.419
William & Mary	7	–	11	.389	13	–	17	.433
UNC Wilmington*	5	–	13	.278	10	–	20	.333
Hofstra	4	–	14	.222	7	–	25	.219
Old Dominion**	3	–	15	.167	5	–	25	.167
† 2013 CAA tournament winner Rankings from AP poll *Ineligible for postseason play due to APR penalties **Ineligible for conference tournament due to changing conferences in 2013

The 2012–13 Delaware Fightin' Blue Hens men's basketball team represented the University of Delaware during the 2012–13 NCAA Division I men's basketball season. The Fightin' Blue Hens, led by seventh year head coach Monté Ross, played their home games at the Bob Carpenter Center and were members of the Colonial Athletic Association. They finished the season 19–14, 13–5 in CAA play to finish in a tie for second place. They lost in the semifinals of the CAA tournament to James Madison.

== Roster ==
2012–13 Delaware Fightin' Blue Hens men's basketball team
Players
Coaches

Pos.	#	Name	Height	Weight	Year	Hometown
F	1	Tom Allshouse (W)	6 ft 6 in (1.98 m)	230 lb (104 kg)	So	Middletown, Delaware
G	4	Jarvis Threatt	6 ft 2 in (1.88 m)	165 lb (75 kg)	So	Richmond, Virginia
G	10	Devon Saddler (C)	6 ft 2 in (1.88 m)	210 lb (95 kg)	Jr	Aberdeen, Maryland
G	12	Terrell Rogers	5 ft 8 in (1.73 m)	160 lb (73 kg)	Fr	Fort Mill, South Carolina
G	13	Kyle Anderson	6 ft 2 in (1.88 m)	195 lb (88 kg)	So	Newark, Illinois
G	14	Brendan McNulty	5 ft 11 in (1.8 m)	205 lb (93 kg)	Sr	Downingtown, Pennsylvania
F	15	Larry Savage	6 ft 5 in (1.96 m)	205 lb (93 kg)	Fr	Onancock, Virginia
F	21	Marvin King-Davis	6 ft 7 in (2.01 m)	210 lb (95 kg)	RS Fr	Richmond, Virginia
G	23	Sean Locke (W)	6 ft 3 in (1.91 m)	195 lb (88 kg)	Fr	Newark, Delaware
F	30	Maurice Jeffers (redshirt)	6 ft 9 in (2.06 m)	235 lb (107 kg)	Fr	Washington D.C.
G	31	Will Townsville	6 ft 3 in (1.91 m)	190 lb (86 kg)	So	Newark, Delaware
F	32	Josh Brinkley	6 ft 6 in (1.98 m)	250 lb (113 kg)	Sr	Richmond, Virginia
F	33	Carl Baptiste	6 ft 9 in (2.06 m)	245 lb (111 kg)	Jr	Pittstown, New Jersey
F	44	Jamelle Hagins	6 ft 9 in (2.06 m)	235 lb (107 kg)	Sr	Roanoke, Virginia
F	55	Tommy Williams	6 ft 8 in (2.03 m)	205 lb (93 kg)	Jr	Hamden, Connecticut

Head coach

- Monté Ross (Winston Salem State)

Assistant coach(es)

- Jeff Rafferty (Springfield)
- Chris Cheeks (Virginia Commonwealth)
- Phil Martelli, Jr. (Saint Joseph's)

Legend

- (C) Team captain
- (S) Suspended
- (I) Ineligible
- (W) Walk-on
- Injured
- Current redshirt

== Schedule ==
Date time, TV	Rank^{#}	Opponent^{#}	Result	Record	Site (attendance) city, state
Regular season
11/10/2012*; 3:00 pm		at La Salle	L 66–73	0–1	Tom Gola Arena (3,400); Philadelphia, PA
11/12/2012*; 9:30 pm		vs. Penn; NIT Season Tip-Off	W 84–69	1–1	John Paul Jones Arena (8,568); Charlottesville, VA
11/13/2012*; 7:00 pm, ESPN3		at Virginia; NIT Season Tip-Off	W 59–53	2–1	John Paul Jones Arena (8,490); Charlottesville, VA
11/21/2012*; 7:00 pm, ESPNU		vs. Kansas State; NIT Season Tip-Off Semifinals	L 63–66	2–2	Madison Square Garden (7,230); New York City, NY
11/23/2012*; 1:30 pm, ESPN		vs. Pittsburgh; NIT Season Tip-Off 3rd Place Game	L 59–85	2–3	Madison Square Garden (7,198); New York, NY
11/25/2012*; 2:00 pm		at Temple	L 75–80	2–4	Liacouras Center (5,158); Philadelphia, PA
11/28/2012*; 7:00 pm		at Lafayette	L 60–63	2–5	Kirby Sports Center (1,079); Easton, PA
12/01/2012*; 2:00 pm, ESPN3		at No. 2 Duke	L 50–88	2–6	Cameron Indoor Stadium (9,314); Durham, NC
12/04/2012*; 7:00 pm		Radford	W 68–59	3–6	Bob Carpenter Center (1,798); Newark, DE
12/08/2012*; 2:00 pm		Delaware State	L 67–73	3–7	Bob Carpenter Center (2,454); Newark, DE
12/16/2012*; 4:00 pm, ESPNU		at Villanova	L 65–75	3–8	The Pavilion (6,500); Philadelphia, PA
12/21/2012*; 7:00 pm		Penn	W 83–60	4–8	Bob Carpenter Center (2,018); Newark, DE
12/31/2012*; 2:00 pm		Rider	W 73–66	5–8	Bob Carpenter Center (2,209); Newark, DE
01/05/2013; 12:00 pm, CSNMA		at Old Dominion	W 84–72	6–8 (1–0)	Ted Constant Convocation Center (6,126); Norfolk, VA
01/09/2013; 7:00 pm		Hofstra	W 69–54	7–8 (2–0)	Bob Carpenter Center (1,881); Newark, DE
01/12/2013; 12:00 pm, CSNMA		at Georgia State	W 86–83	8–8 (3–0)	GSU Sports Arena (1,075); Atlanta, GA
01/16/2013; 7:00 pm		Towson	L 66–69	8–9 (3–1)	Bob Carpenter Center (2,242); Newark, DE
01/19/2013; 2:00 pm		Northeastern	L 70–74	8–10 (3–2)	Bob Carpenter Center (2,685); Newark, DE
01/23/2013; 7:00 pm, CSNMA		at James Madison	L 50–64	8–11 (3–3)	JMU Convocation Center (2,605); Harrisonburg, VA
01/28/2013; 7:00 pm, NBCSN		at Drexel	W 66–64	9–11 (4–3)	Daskalakis Athletic Center (1,569); Philadelphia, PA
01/30/2013; 7:00 pm		William & Mary	W 66–56	10–11 (5–3)	Bob Carpenter Center (2,413); Newark, DE
02/02/2013; 2:00 pm		UNC Wilmington	W 71–56	11–11 (6–3)	Bob Carpenter Center (2,396); Newark, DE
02/06/2013; 7:00 pm		at Towson	L 65–85	11–12 (6–4)	Towson Center (2,409); Towson, MD
02/09/2013; 2:00 pm, CBSSN		at George Mason	W 79–72	12–12 (7–4)	Patriot Center (5,567); Fairfax, VA
02/11/2013; 7:00 pm, NBCSN		Old Dominion	W 75–73	13–12 (8–4)	Bob Carpenter Center (2,357); Newark, DE
02/13/2013; 7:00 pm		at Northeastern	W 76–74 ^{OT}	14–12 (9–4)	Matthews Arena (1,399); Boston, MA
02/17/2013; 7:30 pm, CSNMA		James Madison	L 71–72	14–13 (9–5)	Bob Carpenter Center (3,284); Newark, DE
02/21/2013; 7:00 pm, NBCSN		Drexel	W 73–71 ^{2OT}	15–13 (10–5)	Bob Carpenter Center (2,393); Newark, DE
02/23/2013; 7:00 pm		at UNC Wilmington	W 79–78	16–13 (11–5)	Trask Coliseum (3,432); Wilmington, NC
02/27/2013; 7:00 pm		at Hofstra	W 57–56	17–13 (12–5)	Mack Sports Complex (1,616); Hempstead, NY
03/02/2013; 2:00 pm, NBCSN		George Mason	W 82–77	18–13 (13–5)	Bob Carpenter Center (3,011); Newark, DE
2013 CAA men's basketball tournament
03/09/2013; 6:20 pm, CSN		vs. Hofstra; Quarterfinals	W 62–57	19–13	Richmond Coliseum (4,655); Richmond, VA
03/10/2013; 4:30 pm, NBCSN		vs. James Madison; Semifinals	L 57–58	19–14	Richmond Coliseum (4,065); Richmond, VA
*Non-conference game. ^{#}Rankings from AP Poll. (#) Tournament seedings in parentheses. All times are in Eastern Time.
