= 2012–13 George Mason Patriots men's basketball team =

American college basketball season

2012–13 George Mason Patriots men's basketball

CBI, Runner-Up
- Conference: Colonial Athletic Association
- Record: 22–16 (10–8 CAA)
- Head coach: Paul Hewitt
- Assistant coaches: Roland Houston; Mike Wells; Chris Kreider
- Home arena: Patriot Center; Recreation and Athletic Complex

2012–13 CAA men's basketball standings
	Conf.				Overall
Team	W		L	PCT	W		L	PCT
Northeastern	14	–	4	.778	20	–	13	.606
Towson*	13	–	5	.722	18	–	13	.581
Delaware	13	–	5	.722	19	–	14	.576
James Madison †	11	–	7	.611	21	–	15	.583
George Mason	10	–	8	.556	22	–	16	.579
Georgia State**	10	–	8	.556	15	–	16	.484
Drexel	9	–	9	.500	13	–	18	.419
William & Mary	7	–	11	.389	13	–	17	.433
UNC Wilmington*	5	–	13	.278	10	–	20	.333
Hofstra	4	–	14	.222	7	–	25	.219
Old Dominion**	3	–	15	.167	5	–	25	.167
† 2013 CAA tournament winner Rankings from AP poll *Ineligible for postseason play due to APR penalties **Ineligible for conference tournament due to changing conferences in 2013

The 2012–13 George Mason Patriots men's basketball team represented George Mason University during the 2012–13 NCAA Division I men's basketball season. This was the 47th season for the program. The Patriots, led by head coach Paul Hewitt, were members of the Colonial Athletic Association and played their home games at the Patriot Center, with one home game at the Recreation and Athletic Complex. They finished the season 22–16, 10–8 in CAA play to finish in a tie for fifth place. They advanced to the semifinals of the CAA tournament where they lost to Northeastern. They were invited to the 2013 College Basketball Invitational where they defeated the College of Charleston, Houston, and Western Michigan to advance to the best-of-three games finals series vs Santa Clara. They lost the series to Santa Clara 2 games to 1 to be the CBI Runner-Up.

This was the Patriots final season as a member of the CAA. They joined the Atlantic 10 Conference in July, 2013.

== Awards ==
Second Team All-CAA

- Sherrod Wright

CAA Player of the Week

- Bryon Allen - Nov. 12
- Sherrod Wright - Dec. 24

== Roster ==
2012–13 George Mason Patriots men's basketball team
Players
Coaches
. https://web.archive.org/web/20140407063544/http://m.gomason.com/mobile/ViewArticle.dbml?atclid=205055885&DB_MENU_ID=&SPSID=&SPID=&DB_OEM_ID=25200

Pos.	#	Name	Height	Weight	Year	Previous school	Hometown
G	0	Bryon Allen	6 ft 3 in (1.91 m)	214 lb (97 kg)	Jr	St. Thomas More	Largo, MD
F	5	Jonathan Arledge	6 ft 9 in (2.06 m)	228 lb (103 kg)	Jr	KIMA	Washington, DC
F	1	Paris Bennett	6 ft 6 in (1.98 m)	226 lb (103 kg)	RS Jr	St. Patrick's	Elizabeth, NJ
C	4	Erik Copes	6 ft 8 in (2.03 m)	244 lb (111 kg)	So	Imhotep Charter	Philadelphia, PA
G	13	Corey Edwards	5 ft 11 in (1.8 m)	177 lb (80 kg)	So	Christ the King	Middle Village, NY
F	12	Vaughn Gray	6 ft 5 in (1.96 m)	185 lb (84 kg)	So	St. Benedict's	Elmwood Park, NJ
F	40	Marko Gujaničić	6 ft 9 in (2.06 m)	220 lb (100 kg)	Fr	Stoneridge Prep	Cacak, Serbia
G	3	Patrick Holloway	6 ft 1 in (1.85 m)	185 lb (84 kg)	Fr	Paul VI	Stafford, VA
F	20	Jalen Jenkins	6 ft 7 in (2.01 m)	185 lb (84 kg)	Fr	Cardinal Hayes	Yonkers, NY
G	25	Bryce Lewis	5 ft 9 in (1.75 m)	175 lb (79 kg)	Sr	Union	Union, NJ
F	14	Anali Okoloji	6 ft 8 in (2.03 m)	232 lb (105 kg)	So	Impact Academy	Brooklyn, NY
F	30	Michael Rudy	6 ft 7 in (2.01 m)	195 lb (88 kg)	Fr	Saint Thomas More	Falls Church, VA
G	11	Vertrail Vaughns	6 ft 2 in (1.88 m)	184 lb (83 kg)	RS Jr	Mesquite	Mesquite, TX
F	2	Johnnie Williams	6 ft 8 in (2.03 m)	266 lb (121 kg)	RS Jr	Briarcrest Christian	Memphis, TN
G	10	Sherrod Wright	6 ft 4 in (1.93 m)	202 lb (92 kg)	RS Jr	Mount Vernon	Mount Vernon, NY

Head coach

- Paul Hewitt (St. John Fisher)

Assistant coach(es)

- Chris Kreider (Lebanon Valley)
- Roland Houston (Rhode Island)
- Mike Wells (Mount Vernon Nazarene)

Legend

- (C) Team captain
- (S) Suspended
- (I) Ineligible
- (W) Walk-on
- Injured
- Current redshirt

Roster
Last update: 2011-10-20

== Stats ==
Player	GP	GS	MPG	FG%	3FG%	FT%	RPG	APG	SPG	BPG	PPG
Sherrod Wright	38	38	32.3	.465	.351	.777	4.9	1.5	1.0	0.3	16.6
Jonathan Arledge	38	22	19.4	.488	.414	.814	4.8	0.8	0.6	0.5	9.0
Bryon Allen	38	28	27.0	.465	.333	.750	3.0	4.0	1.3	0.1	8.3
Johnny Williams	20	20	24.8	.410	.000	.667	4.1	0.7	0.9	0.7	7.0
Erik Copes	34	34	25.0	.474	.000	.551	6.0	0.5	0.4	1.1	5.9
Marko Gujanicic	37	0	19.8	.387	.290	.639	3.7	1.3	0.7	0.1	5.3
Patrick Holloway	38	0	13.1	.363	.343	.571	0.9	0.6	0.6	0.0	5.3
Vertrail Vaughns	36	0	15.3	.408	.338	.763	1.1	0.4	0.5	0.0	5.0
Corey Edwards	38	30	20.4	.459	.500	.688	1.7	2.8	1.3	0.0	4.9
Anali Okoloji	33	18	12.4	.348	.229	.750	2.6	0.3	0.5	0.2	2.9
Paris Bennett	24	0	10.3	.424	.250	.737	1.9	0.2	0.2	0.2	2.7
Vaughn Gray	16	0	7.5	.367	.273	.400	0.7	0.1	0.4	0.1	1.7
Michael Rudy	2	0	2.0	.500	.000	.500	0.0	0.0	0.0	0.0	1.5
Bryce Lewis	2	0	3.0	.500	.000	.000	1.0	1.0	0.0	0.0	1.0

== Game log ==
Date time, TV	Rank^{#}	Opponent^{#}	Result	Record	High points	High rebounds	High assists	Site (attendance) city, state
Exhibition
October 25, 2012*; 7:00 pm		Bowie State	W 76–72		– -	– -	– -	Patriot Center (3,044); Fairfax, VA
Non-conference regular season
November 9, 2012*; 7:00 pm, MASN		Virginia	W 63–59	1–0	15 – Wright	7 – Gujanicic	5 – Allen	Patriot Center (9,840); Fairfax, VA
November 13, 2012*; 7:00 pm		at Bucknell	L 56–61	1–1	16 – Wright	6 – Gujanicic	2 – Allen, Edwards	Sojka Pavilion (3,272); Lewisburg, PA
November 16, 2012*; 1:30 pm		vs. Mercer; Paradise Jam Quarterfinals	W 52–49	2–1	16 – Williams	10 – Williams	2 – Allen, Williams	Sports and Fitness Center (N/A); Saint Thomas, VI
November 18, 2012*; 6:00 pm, CBSSN		vs. New Mexico; Paradise Jam Semifinals	L 69–70	2–2	22 – Wright	8 – Williams	4 – Edwards	Sports and Fitness Center (N/A); Saint Thomas, VI
November 19, 2012*; 8:30 pm, CBSSN		vs. Quinnipiac; Paradise Jam Tournament 3rd place game	W 74–58	3–2	14 – Wright	7 – Wright	4 – Allen	Sports and Fitness Center (3,022); Saint Thomas, VI
November 24, 2012*; 4:00 pm		Boston University	W 48–45	4–2	10 – Williams	9 – Wright	5 – Allen	Patriot Center (4,375); Fairfax, VA
November 28, 2012*; 8:00 pm, CBSSN		at Rhode Island	W 55–52	5–2	14 – Wright	11 – Copes	3 – Arledge	Ryan Center (4,056); Kingston, RI
December 2, 2012*; 2:30 pm, MASN		vs. Maryland; BB&T Classic Basketball Tournament	L 62–69	5–3	17 – Holloway, Wright	7 – Wright	7 – Allen	Verizon Center (10,256); Washington, DC
December 4, 2012*; 7:00 pm, MASN		UMBC	W 74–63	6–3	23 – Wright	7 – Arledge, Okoloji	3 – Okoloji	Patriot Center (3,509); Fairfax, VA
December 8, 2012*; 6:00 pm, NBCSN		Northern Iowa	L 77–82 ^{OT}	6–4	20 – Wright	7 – Okoloji	3 – Allen, Edwards	Patriot Center (6,487); Fairfax, VA
December 22, 2012*; 3:00 pm, NBCSN		vs. Richmond; Governor's Holiday Hoops Classic	W 67–64	7–4	22 – Wright	8 – Arledge	3 – Gujanicic, Edwards, Wright	Richmond Coliseum (6,944); Richmond, VA
December 29, 2012*; 7:00 pm, MASN/ESPN3		at South Florida	L 57–61	7–5	22 – Wright	6 – Copes, Wright	4 – Wright	USF Sun Dome (4,856); Tampa, FL
CAA regular season
January 3, 2013; 7:00 pm, NBCSN		Northeastern	L 74–84	7–6 (0–1)	19 – Wright	9 – Arledge, Copes	7 – Edwards	Patriot Center (3,724); Fairfax, VA
January 5, 2013; 2:00 pm, CSNMA		at William & Mary	W 73–66	8–6 (1–1)	28 – Wright	7 – Wright	5 – Edwards	Kaplan Arena (3,506); Williamsburg, VA
January 10, 2013; 7:00 pm, NBCSN		Old Dominion	W 71–46	9–6 (2–1)	15 – Holloway	3 – Tied (5)	5 – Allen, Edwards	Patriot Center (4,011); Fairfax, VA
January 12, 2013; 2:00 pm, CSNMA		at UNC Wilmington	L 74–82	9–7 (2–2)	25 – Wright	6 – Williams, Wright	3 – Edwards, Holloway	Trask Coliseum (3,031); Wilmington, NC
January 15, 2013; 7:00 pm, CSNMA		James Madison	W 68–57	10–7 (3–2)	23 – Wright	10 – Gujanicic	3 – Allen, Edwards	Patriot Center (4,241); Fairfax, VA
January 19, 2013; 5:00 pm, NBCSN		Hofstra	W 57–46	11–7 (4–2)	21 – Wright	7 – Arledge	2 – Allen, Edwards	Patriot Center (5,810); Fairfax, VA
January 23, 2013; 7:00 pm, MASN		at Towson	W 77–67	12–7 (5–2)	24 – Wright	9 – Gujanicic	6 – Allen	Towson Center (2,005); Towson, MD
January 27, 2013; 8:00 pm, CSNMA		at Northeastern	L 51–71	12–8 (5–3)	13 – Vaughns	7 – Gujanicic	3 – Tied (3)	Matthews Arena (1,971); Boston, MA
January 31, 2013; 7:00 pm, NBCSN		Drexel	L 54–58	12–9 (5–4)	15 – Wright	6 – Copes	2 – Tied (3)	Patriot Center (4,365); Fairfax, VA
February 2, 2013; 4:00 pm, CSNMA		at James Madison	W 74–63	13–9 (6–4)	22 – Wright	11 – Wright	7 – Allen	JMU Convocation Center (5,170); Harrisonburg, VA
February 4, 2013; 7:00 pm, NBCSN		at Old Dominion	W 85–74	14–9 (7–4)	21 – Arledge	9 – Wright	8 – Allen	Ted Constant Convocation Center (6,290); Norfolk, VA
February 9, 2013; 2:00 pm, CBSSN		Delaware	L 72–79	14–10 (7–5)	15 – Arledge	11 – Arledge	8 – Allen	Patriot Center (5,567); Fairfax, VA
February 14, 2013; 7:00 pm, CBSSN		at Drexel	W 68–62	15–10 (8–5)	14 – Vaughns	8 – Copes	4 – Allen	Daskalakis Athletic Center (1,623); Philadelphia, PA
February 16, 2013; 4:00 pm, CSNMA		Georgia State; Homecoming	L 60–78	15–11 (8–6)	19 – Wright	6 – Copes	4 – Edwards	Patriot Center (8,010); Fairfax, VA
February 20, 2013; 7:00 pm		at Hofstra	W 79–50	16–11 (9–6)	20 – Arledge	10 – Copes	5 – Edwards	Mack Sports Complex (1,506); Hempstead, NY
February 23, 2013; 4:00 pm, CSNMA		William & Mary	W 60–58	17–11 (10–6)	15 – Holloway	9 – Arledge	4 – Allen	Patriot Center (6,215); Fairfax, VA
February 26, 2013; 7:00 pm, CSNMA		Towson	L 81–85 ^{OT}	17–12 (10–7)	17 – Arledge	15 – Copes	4 – Allen	Patriot Center (3,956); Fairfax, VA
March 2, 2013; 2:00 pm, NBCSN		at Delaware	L 77–82	17–13 (10–8)	21 – Gujanicic	6 – Vaughns	5 – Edwards	Bob Carpenter Center (3,011); Newark, DE
CAA tournament
March 9, 2013; 3:30 pm, CSNMA	(4)	vs. (5) Drexel; Quarterfinals	W 60–54	18–13	23 – Wright	8 – Arledge	1 – Tied (3)	Richmond Coliseum (4,655); Richmond, VA
March 10, 2013; 2:00 pm, CSNMA/NBCSN	(4)	vs. (1) Northeastern; Semifinals	L 67–69	18–14	20 – Allen	6 – Gujanicic	4 – Allen, Edwards	Richmond Coliseum (4,065); Richmond, VA
College Basketball Invitational
March 19, 2013*; 7:00 pm, AXS TV		at College of Charleston; First Round	W 78–77	19–14	20 – Wright	5 – Arledge	6 – Allen	TD Arena (1,713); Charleston, SC
March 25, 2013*; 7:00 pm, AXS TV		Houston; Quarterfinals	W 88–84 ^{OT}	20–14	29 – Wright	9 – Arledge	9 – Allen	Patriot Center (2,044); Fairfax, VA
March 27, 2013*; 7:00 pm, AXS TV		Western Michigan; Semifinals	W 62–52	21–14	23 – Arledge	5 – Arledge, Copes	7 – Allen	Patriot Center (1,684); Fairfax, VA
April 1, 2013*; 10:00 pm, AXS TV		at Santa Clara; Finals Game 1	L 73–81	21–15	21 – Arledge	14 – Copes	8 – Allen	Leavey Center (1,154); Santa Clara, CA
April 3, 2013*; 7:00 pm, AXS TV		Santa Clara; Finals Game 2	W 73–66	22–15	20 – Wright	10 – Wright	4 – Allen	Recreation and Athletic Complex (1,280); Fairfax, VA
April 5, 2013*; 7:00 pm, AXS TV		Santa Clara; Finals Game 3	L 77–80	22–16	24 – Wright	11 – Copes	4 – Allen, Edwards	Patriot Center (2,440); Fairfax, VA
*Non-conference game. (#) Tournament seedings in parentheses. All times are in Eastern Time.

== Recruiting ==
The following is a list of players signed for the 2013–14 season:

College recruiting information
Name	Hometown	School	Height	Weight	Commit date
Marquise Moore; G	Oakdale, CT	St. Thomas More	6 ft 2 in (1.88 m)	185 lb (84 kg)	May 2, 2013
Marquise Moore; G	Recruit ratings: Rivals:				
Overall recruit ranking:
Note: In many cases, Scout, Rivals, 247Sports, On3, and ESPN may conflict in their listings of height and weight.; In these cases, the average was taken. ESPN grades are on a 100-point scale.; Sources: "ESPN". ESPN.; "2013 Team Ranking". Rivals.
