= Coastal Athletic Association Men's Basketball Coach of the Year =

US sporting award

CAA Men's Basketball Coach of the Year
- Awarded for: the most outstanding men's basketball head coach in the Coastal Athletic Association
- Country: United States

History
- First award: 1984
- Most recent: Takayo Siddle, UNC Wilmington

The Coastal Athletic Association Men's Basketball Coach of the Year (formerly the Colonial Athletic Association Men's Basketball Coach of the Year) is a basketball award given to the most outstanding men's basketball head coach in the Coastal Athletic Association, as chosen by a panel of sports writers and broadcasters. The award was first given following the 1983–84 season, the first year of the conference's existence, to Joe Harrington of George Mason and Dick Tarrant of Richmond. Tarrant and Bruiser Flint of Drexel have won the most awards with four, while six other coaches have won the award twice.

== Key ==
	Awarded one of the following National Coach of the Year awards that year: Associated Press Coach of the Year (AP); Adolph Rupp Cup (ARC); Basketball Times Coach of the Year (BT); CBS/Chevrolet Coach of the Year (CBS); Naismith Coach of the Year (N); NABC Coach of the Year (NABC); Sporting News Coach of the Year (SN); U.S. Basketball Writers Association (USBWA)
Coach (X)	Denotes the number of times the coach had been awarded the Coach of the Year award at that point
†	Co-Coaches of the Year
*	Elected to the Naismith Memorial Basketball Hall of Fame as a coach but is no longer active
*^	Active coach who has been elected to the Naismith Memorial Hall of Fame (as a coach)
Conf. W–L	Conference win–loss record for that season
Conf. St.^{T}	Conference standing at year's end (^{T}denotes a tie)
Overall W–L	Overall win–loss record for that season

== Winners ==
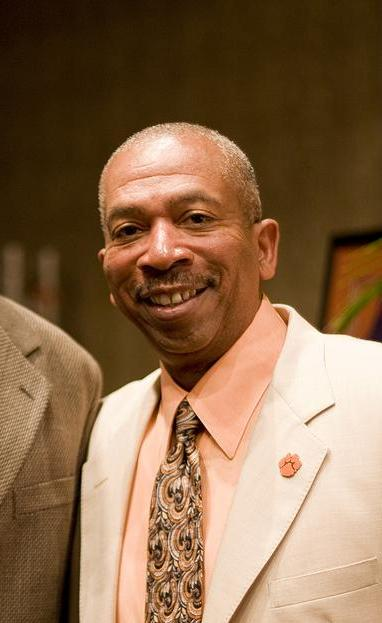
Oliver Purnell won in 1993 as Old Dominion's coach.

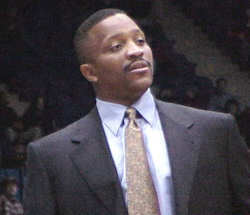
Drexel coach Bruiser Flint has won the award four times, most recently in 2012.

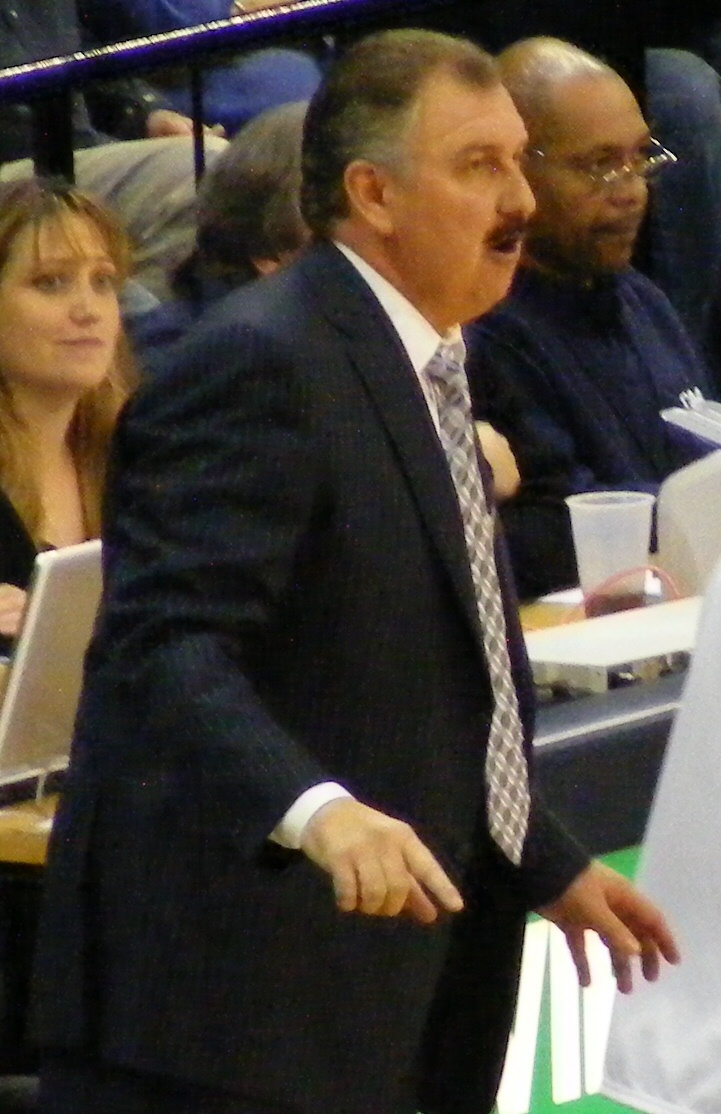
Blaine Taylor was Coach of the Year in 2005 while at Old Dominion.

Season	Coach	School	National Coach of the Year Awards	Conf. W–L	Conf. St.	Overall W–L
1982–83	Bruce Parkhill	William & Mary	—	9–0	1	20–9
1983–84^{†}	Joe Harrington	George Mason	—	5–5	4^{T}	21–7
1983–84^{†}	Dick Tarrant	Richmond	—	7–3	1	22–10
1984–85	Paul Evans	Navy	—	11–3	1	26–6
1985–86	Dick Tarrant (2)	Richmond	—	12–2	2	23–7
1986–87	John Thurston	James Madison	—	8–6	?	20–10
1987–88^{†}	Ed Tapscott	American	—	?	?	14–14
1987–88^{†}	Rick Barnes	George Mason	—	10–5	2	20–10
1988–89	Dick Tarrant (3)	Richmond	—	13–1	1	21–10
1989–90	Lefty Driesell*	James Madison	—	11–3	1	20–11
1990–91	Dick Tarrant (4)	Richmond	—	10–4	2	22–10
1991–92	Lefty Driesell* (2)	James Madison	—	12–2	1^{T}	21–11
1992–93	Oliver Purnell	Old Dominion	—	11–3	1^{T}	21–8
1993–94	Bill Dooley	Richmond	—	8–6	4	14–14
1994–95	Jeff Capel II	Old Dominion	—	12–2	1	21–12
1995–96	Sonny Smith	VCU	—	14–2	1	24–9
1996–97	Jerry Wainwright	UNC Wilmington	—	10–6	1^{T}	16–14
1997–98	Charlie Woollum	William & Mary	—	13–3	1^{T}	20–7
1998–99	Jim Larrañaga	George Mason	—	13–3	1	19–11
1999–00	Sherman Dillard	James Madison	—	12–4	1^{T}	20–9
2000–01	Jerry Wainwright (2)	UNC Wilmington	—	11–5	2^{T}	19–11
2001–02	Bruiser Flint	Drexel	—	11–7	3^{T}	14–14
2002–03	Brad Brownell	UNC Wilmington	—	15–3	1	24–7
2003–04	Bruiser Flint (2)	Drexel	—	13–5	2	18–11
2004–05	Blaine Taylor	Old Dominion	—	15–3	1	28–6
2005–06	Brad Brownell (2)	UNC Wilmington	—	15–3	1^{T}	25–8
2006–07	Anthony Grant	VCU	—	16–2	1	28–7
2007–08	Tony Shaver	William & Mary	—	10–8	5	17–16
2008–09	Bruiser Flint (3)	Drexel	—	10–8	6	15–13
2009–10	Tony Shaver (2)	William & Mary	—	12–6	3	22–11
2010–11	Jim Larrañaga (2)	George Mason	—	16–2	1	27–7
2011–12	Bruiser Flint (4)	Drexel	—	16–2	1	29–7
2012–13	Pat Skerry	Towson	—	13–5	2^{T}	18–13
2013–14	Monté Ross	Delaware	—	14–2	1	22–9
2014–15	Kevin Keatts	UNC Wilmington	—	12–6	1^{T}	18–14
2015–16	Kevin Keatts (2)	UNC Wilmington	—	14–4	1^{T}	25–8
2016–17	Earl Grant	College of Charleston	—	14–4	2	25–10
2017–18	Bill Coen	Northeastern	—	14–4	1^{T}	23–10
2018–19	Joe Mihalich	Hofstra	—	15–3	1	25–6
2019–20	Dane Fischer	William & Mary	—	13–5	2	21–11
2020–21	Mark Byington	James Madison	—	8–2	1^{T}	13–6
2021–22	Takayo Siddle	UNC Wilmington	—	15–3	1^{T}	21–8
2022–23	Speedy Claxton	Hofstra	—	16–2	1^{T}	23–8
2023–24	Pat Kelsey	Charleston	—	15–3	1	27–8
2024–25	Pat Skerry (2)	Towson	—	16–2	1	21–10
2025–26	Takayo Siddle (2)	UNC Wilmington	—	15–3	1	TBD

== Winners by school ==
School (year joined)	Winners	Years
UNC Wilmington (1985)	8	1997, 2001, 2003, 2006, 2015, 2016, 2022, 2026
James Madison (1982) (Note: James Madison left for the Sun Belt Conference (SBC) in 2022.)	5	1987, 1990, 1992, 2000, 2021
Richmond (1982) (Note: Richmond left for the Atlantic 10 Conference (A-10) in 2001.)	5	1984^{†}, 1986, 1989, 1991, 1994
William & Mary (1982)	5	1983, 1998, 2008, 2010, 2020
Drexel (2001)	4	2002, 2004, 2009, 2012
George Mason (1982) (Note: George Mason left for the A-10 in 2013.)	4	1984^{†}, 1988^{†}, 1999, 2011
Old Dominion (1991) (Note: Old Dominion left for Conference USA in 2013, and is now in the SBC.)	3	1993, 1995, 2005
Charleston (2013)	2	2017, 2024
Hofstra (2001)	2	2019, 2023
Towson (2001)	2	2013, 2025
VCU (1995) (Note: VCU left for the A-10 in 2012.)	2	1996, 2007
American (1984) (Note: American left for the Patriot League in 2001.)	1	1988^{†}
Delaware (2001)	1	2014
Navy (1982) (Note: The United States Naval Academy (Navy) left for the Patriot League in 1991.)	1	1985
Northeastern (2005)	1	2018
Elon (2014)	0	—
Georgia State (2005) (Note: Georgia State left for the SBC in 2013.)	0	—

== See also ==
- List of coaches in the Naismith Memorial Basketball Hall of Fame
