= 2012–13 Northeastern Huskies men's basketball team =

American college basketball season

2012–13 Northeastern Huskies men's basketball

CAA Regular Season Champions

NIT, First Round
- Conference: Colonial Athletic Association
- Record: 20–13 (14–4 CAA)
- Head coach: Bill Coen (7th season)
- Assistant coaches: Pat Duquette; Jim McCarthy; Antonio Reynolds-Dean
- Home arena: Matthews Arena

2012–13 CAA men's basketball standings
	Conf.				Overall
Team	W		L	PCT	W		L	PCT
Northeastern	14	–	4	.778	20	–	13	.606
Towson*	13	–	5	.722	18	–	13	.581
Delaware	13	–	5	.722	19	–	14	.576
James Madison †	11	–	7	.611	21	–	15	.583
George Mason	10	–	8	.556	22	–	16	.579
Georgia State**	10	–	8	.556	15	–	16	.484
Drexel	9	–	9	.500	13	–	18	.419
William & Mary	7	–	11	.389	13	–	17	.433
UNC Wilmington*	5	–	13	.278	10	–	20	.333
Hofstra	4	–	14	.222	7	–	25	.219
Old Dominion**	3	–	15	.167	5	–	25	.167
† 2013 CAA tournament winner Rankings from AP poll *Ineligible for postseason play due to APR penalties **Ineligible for conference tournament due to changing conferences in 2013

The 2012–13 Northeastern Huskies men's basketball team represented Northeastern University during the 2012–13 NCAA Division I men's basketball season. The Huskies, led by seventh year head coach Bill Coen, played their home games at Matthews Arena and were members of the Colonial Athletic Association. They finished the season 20–13, 14–4 in CAA play to claim the regular season CAA championship. They advanced to the championship game of the CAA tournament where they lost to James Madison. As a regular season conference champion who failed to win their conference tournament, they earned an automatic bid to the 2013 NIT where they lost in the first round to Alabama.

== Roster ==
Number	Name	Position	Height	Weight	Year	Hometown
1	Chris Avenant	Guard	6–4	193	Junior	Sacramento, California
2	Demetrius Pollard	Guard	6–2	200	Sophomore	Virginia Beach, Virginia
4	David Walker	Guard	6–6	176	Freshman	Stow, Ohio
11	Marcos Benegas-Flores	Guard	6–1	190	Sophomore	Boston
12	Quincy Ford	Guard/Forward	6–8	212	Sophomore	St. Petersburg, Florida
14	Jonathan Lee	Guard	6–2	200	Senior	Flint, Michigan
20	Joel Smith	Guard	6–4	180	Senior	Leander, Texas
21	Dinko Marshavelski	Forward/Center	6–11	240	Junior	Plovdiv, Bulgaria
24	Derrico Peck	Forward	6–5	204	Freshman	Woodstock, Georgia
33	Zach Stahl	Guard	6–5	201	Freshman	Chanhassen, Minnesota
34	Kwesi Abakah	Forward	6–8	193	Freshman	Suwanee, Georgia
43	Scott Eatherton	Forward	6–8	219	Junior	Hershey, Pennsylvania
44	Reggie Spencer	Forward	6–7	210	Sophomore	Tuscaloosa, Alabama

== Schedule ==
Date time, TV	Opponent	Result	Record	Site (attendance) city, state
Regular season
11/09/2012*; 7:00 pm	Boston University	W 65–64	1–0	Matthews Arena (3,242); Boston
11/13/2012*; 7:00 pm	at Princeton	W 67–66	2–0	Jadwin Gymnasium (1,481); Princeton, New Jersey
11/17/2012*; 7:00 pm	Vermont	L 55–66	2–1	Matthews Arena (1,369); Boston
11/21/2012*; 7:30 pm	vs. UC Riverside; Great Alaska Shootout First Round	W 61–52	3–1	Sullivan Arena (4,230); Anchorage, AK
11/23/2012*; 11:00 pm, CBSSN	vs. Belmont; Great Alaska Shootout Semifinals	W 74–71	4–1	Sullivan Arena (4,699); Anchorage, AK
11/25/2012*; 12:30 am, CBSSN	vs. Charlotte; Great Alaska Shootout Championship	L 59–67	4–2	Sullivan Arena (4,553); Anchorage, AK
11/28/2012*; 7:00 pm	Maine	L 73–76	4–3	Matthews Arena (724); Boston
12/04/2012*; 7:00 pm	Massachusetts	L 66–72	4–4	Matthews Arena (2,441); Boston
12/08/2012*; 7:00 pm	La Salle	L 64–66	4–5	Matthews Arena (1,839); Boston
12/18/2012*; 12:00 pm	UNC Asheville	L 73–79	4–6	Matthews Arena (2,134); Boston
12/21/2012*; 8:00 pm	at Central Connecticut	W 82–63	5–6	William H. Detrick Gymnasium (1,526); New Britain, Connecticut
12/29/2012*; 3:00 pm	at UAB	L 63–83	5–7	Bartow Arena (3,527); Birmingham, Alabama
01/03/2013; 7:00 pm, NBCSN	at George Mason	W 84–74	6–7 (1–0)	Patriot Center (3,724); Fairfax, Virginia
01/05/2013; 1:00 pm	UNC Wilmington	W 68–64	7–7 (2–0)	Matthews Arena (2,482); Boston
01/08/2013; 7:00 pm, CSNNE	at Drexel	W 63–58 ^{OT}	8–7 (3–0)	Daskalakis Athletic Center (1,923); Philadelphia
01/12/2013; 12:00 pm	at Towson	W 70–59	9–7 (4–0)	Towson Center (1,814); Towson, Maryland
01/16/2013; 7:00 pm	Hofstra	W 65–60	10–7 (5–0)	Matthews Arena (1,951); Boston
01/19/2013; 2:00 pm	at Delaware	W 74–70	11–7 (6–0)	Bob Carpenter Center (2,685); Newark, Delaware
01/23/2013; 7:00 pm	at William & Mary	W 95–91 ^{2OT}	12–7 (7–0)	Kaplan Arena (1,004); Williamsburg, Virginia
01/27/2013; 8:00 pm, CSNNE	George Mason	W 71–51	13–7 (8–0)	Matthews Arena (1,971); Boston
01/30/2013; 7:00 pm	Georgia State	L 73–78	13–8 (8–1)	Matthews Arena (1,845); Boston
02/02/2013; 6:00 pm, CSNNE	Drexel	W 59–52	14–8 (9–1)	Matthews Arena (2,448); Boston
02/06/2013; 7:00 pm	at Hofstra	W 62–57	15–8 (10–1)	Mack Sports Complex (1,879); Hempstead, New York
02/09/2013; 4:00 pm, CSNNE	at Old Dominion	W 79–74 ^{OT}	16–8 (11–1)	Ted Constant Convocation Center (6,532); Norfolk, Virginia
02/11/2013; 7:00 pm	William & Mary	W 68–64	17–8 (12–1)	Matthews Arena (2,275); Boston
02/13/2013; 7:00 pm	Delaware	L 74–76 ^{OT}	17–9 (12–2)	Matthews Arena (1,399); Boston
02/16/2013; 7:00 pm	at UNC Wilmington	L 67–73	17–10 (12–3)	Trask Coliseum (3,730); Wilmington, North Carolina
02/20/2013; 7:00 pm, CSNNE	James Madison	W 66–64	18–10 (13–3)	Matthews Arena (3,463); Boston
02/27/2013; 7:00 pm	at Georgia State	W 90–84 ^{OT}	19–10 (14–3)	GSU Sports Arena (1,576); Atlanta
03/02/2013; 12:00 pm, CSNNE	Old Dominion	L 74–81	19–11 (14–4)	Matthews Arena (1,927); Boston
2013 CAA tournament
03/10/2013; 2:00 pm, NBCSN	vs. George Mason; Semifinals	W 69–67	20–11	Richmond Coliseum (4,065); Richmond, Virginia
03/11/2013; 7:00 pm, NBCSN	vs. James Madison; Championship Game	L 57–70	20–12	Richmond Coliseum (6,038); Richmond, Virginia
2013 NIT
3/19/2013; 9:00 pm, ESPN2	at Alabama; First Round	L 43–62	20–13	Coleman Coliseum (2,889); Tuscaloosa, Alabama
*Non-conference game. ^{#}Rankings from AP Poll. (#) Tournament seedings in parentheses. All times are in Eastern Time.
