= 2012–13 Hofstra Pride men's basketball team =

American college basketball season

2012–13 Hofstra Pride men's basketball
- Conference: Colonial Athletic Association
- Record: 7–25 (4–14 CAA)
- Head coach: Mo Cassara (3rd season)
- Assistant coaches: Steven DeMeo; Wayne Morgan; Patrick Sellers
- Home arena: Mack Sports Complex

2012–13 CAA men's basketball standings
	Conf.				Overall
Team	W		L	PCT	W		L	PCT
Northeastern	14	–	4	.778	20	–	13	.606
Towson*	13	–	5	.722	18	–	13	.581
Delaware	13	–	5	.722	19	–	14	.576
James Madison †	11	–	7	.611	21	–	15	.583
George Mason	10	–	8	.556	22	–	16	.579
Georgia State**	10	–	8	.556	15	–	16	.484
Drexel	9	–	9	.500	13	–	18	.419
William & Mary	7	–	11	.389	13	–	17	.433
UNC Wilmington*	5	–	13	.278	10	–	20	.333
Hofstra	4	–	14	.222	7	–	25	.219
Old Dominion**	3	–	15	.167	5	–	25	.167
† 2013 CAA tournament winner Rankings from AP poll *Ineligible for postseason play due to APR penalties **Ineligible for conference tournament due to changing conferences in 2013

The 2012–13 Hofstra Pride men's basketball team represented Hofstra University during the 2012–13 NCAA Division I men's basketball season. The Pride, led by third year head coach Mo Cassara, played their home games at Mack Sports Complex and were members of the Colonial Athletic Association. They finished the season 7–25, 4–14 in CAA play to finish in tenth place. They lost in the quarterfinals of the CAA tournament to Delaware.

== Roster ==
Number	Name	Position	Height	Weight	Year	Hometown
0	Jordan Allen	Forward	6–6	200	Freshman	Bay Shore, New York
1	Jimmy Hall	Forward	6–7	215	Freshman	Brooklyn, New York
2	Taran Buie	Guard	6–2	185	Sophomore	Albany, New York
3	Stevie Mejia	Guard	5–9	175	Senior	Hyde Park, Massachusetts
4	Shaquille Stokes	Guard	5–10	175	Sophomore	Harlem, New York
5	David Imes	Forward	6–7	240	Senior	Brooklyn, New York
11	Dallas Anglin	Guard	6–1	175	Freshman	Montclair, New Jersey
12	Darren Peyen	Forward	6–8	205	Freshman	Milford, Connecticut
15	Daquan Brown	Forward	6–10	215	Junior	Brooklyn, New York
20	Matt Grogan	Guard	6–5	195	Senior	Middle Village, New York
23	Jamal Coombs-McDaniel	Forward	6–7	210	Junior	Dorchester, Massachusetts
24	Stepen Nwaukoni	Forward	6–8	240	Junior	Queens, New York
31	Moussa Kone	Forward	6–7	220	Sophomore	Bronx, New York
44	Kentrell Washington	Guard	6–3	180	Freshman	Las Vegas

== Schedule ==
Date time, TV	Opponent	Result	Record	Site (attendance) city, state
Exhibition
11/03/2012*; 4:00 pm	Queens College	W 78–47		Mack Sports Complex; Hempstead, New York
Regular season
11/09/2012*; 7:00 pm	at Monmouth	L 62–91	0–1	Multipurpose Activity Center (2,307); West Long Branch, New Jersey
11/11/2012*; 2:00 pm	at Purdue; 2K Sports Classic	L 54–83	0–2	Mackey Arena (13,427); West Lafayette, Indiana
11/16/2012*; 7:00 pm	South Dakota State; 2K Sports Classic	W 66–63	1–2	Mack Sports Complex (3,142); Hempstead, New York
11/17/2012*; 5:00 pm	U of D.C. 2K Sports Classic	W 74–59	2–2	Mack Sports Complex (2,076); Hempstead, New York
11/18/2012*; 3:00 pm	Marshall; 2K Sports Classic	W 103–100 ^{2OT}	3–2	Mack Sports Complex (1,276); Hempstead, New York
11/21/2012*; 7:00 pm	at Manhattan	L 56–67	3–3	Draddy Gymnasium (1,031); Riverdale, New York
11/24/2012*; 2:00 pm	at George Washington	L 56–80	3–4	Charles E. Smith Athletic Center (1,371); Washington, D.C.
12/01/2012*; 4:00 pm	SMU	L 47–73	3–5	Mack Sports Complex (3,147); Hempstead, New York
12/04/2012*; 7:00 pm	Wagner	L 44–52	3–6	Mack Sports Complex (1,239); Hempstead, New York
12/08/2012*; 2:00 pm	at Long Island	L 84–88	3–7	Athletic, Recreation & Wellness Center (1,208); Brooklyn, New York
12/15/2012*; 2:00 pm	Wright State	L 57–63	3–8	Mack Sports Complex (1,768); Hempstead, New York
12/22/2012*; 3:00 pm	vs. Tulane; Brooklyn Hoops Holiday Invitational	L 62–83	3–9	Barclays Center (N/A); Brooklyn, New York
01/01/2013*; 2:00 pm	at Florida Atlantic	L 57–61	3–10	FAU Arena (1,349); Boca Raton, Florida
01/07/2013; 7:00 pm	Georgia State	W 52–50	4–10 (1–0)	Mack Sports Complex (1,169); Hempstead, New York
01/09/2013; 7:00 pm	at Delaware	L 54–69	4–11 (1–1)	Bob Carpenter Center (1,881); Newark, Delaware
01/12/2013; 4:00 pm	William & Mary	W 70–59	5–11 (2–1)	Mack Sports Complex (2,119); Hempstead, New York
01/16/2013; 7:00 pm	at Northeastern	L 60–65	5–12 (2–2)	Matthews Arena (1,951); Boston
01/19/2013; 5:00 pm, NBCSN	at George Mason	L 46–57	5–13 (2–3)	Patriot Center (5,810); Fairfax, Virginia
01/23/2013; 7:00 pm	Drexel	L 52–55	5–14 (2–4)	Mack Sports Complex (1,543); Hempstead, New York
01/26/2013; 2:00 pm	UNC Wilmington	L 51–57	5–15 (2–5)	Mack Sports Complex (2,173); Hempstead, New York
01/31/2013; 7:00 pm	at James Madison	L 41–62	5–16 (2–6)	JMU Convocation Center (2,986); Harrisonburg, Virginia
02/02/2013; 12:00 pm, CSNMA, CSNNE, MSG	at William & Mary	L 59–72	5–17 (2–7)	Kaplan Arena (3,031); Williamsburg, Virginia
02/06/2013; 7:00 pm	Northeastern	L 57–62	5–18 (2–8)	Mack Sports Complex (1,879); Hempstead, New York
02/09/2013; 12:00 pm, CSNMA, MSG, WECT	at UNC Wilmington	W 65–56	6–18 (3–8)	Trask Coliseum (2,901); Wilmington, North Carolina
02/13/2013; 7:00 pm	at Georgia State	L 43–61	6–19 (3–9)	GSU Sports Arena (1,384); Atlanta
02/16/2013; 4:00 pm	Towson	L 50–57	6–20 (3–10)	Mack Sports Complex (2,756); Hempstead, New York
02/18/2013; 7:00 pm, NBCSN	at Drexel	L 54–63	6–21 (3–11)	Daskalakis Athletic Center (1,744); Philadelphia
02/20/2013; 7:00 pm	George Mason	L 50–79	6–22 (3–12)	Mack Sports Complex (1,506); Hempstead, New York
02/24/2013; 7:00 pm, CSN-MA, SNY	Old Dominion	W 70–59	7–22 (4–12)	Mack Sports Complex (1,626); Hempstead, New York
02/27/2013; 7:00 pm	Delaware	L 56–57	7–23 (4–13)	Mack Sports Complex (1,616); Hempstead, New York
03/02/2013; 4:00 pm	at Towson	L 64–67	7–24 (4–14)	Towson Center (4,119); Towson, Maryland
2013 CAA men's basketball tournament
03/09/2013; 6:20 pm, CSN	vs. Delaware; Quarterfinals	L 57–62	7–25	Richmond Coliseum (4,655); Richmond, Virginia
*Non-conference game. ^{#}Rankings from AP Poll. (#) Tournament seedings in parentheses. All times are in Eastern Time.
