= 2012–13 James Madison Dukes men's basketball team =

American college basketball season

2012–13 James Madison Dukes men's basketball

CAA tournament champions

NCAA tournament, Round of 64
- Conference: Colonial Athletic Association
- Record: 21–15 (11–7 CAA)
- Head coach: Matt Brady (5th season)
- Assistant coaches: Rob O'Driscoll; Mike Deane; Bill Phillips
- Home arena: JMU Convocation Center

2012–13 CAA men's basketball standings
	Conf.				Overall
Team	W		L	PCT	W		L	PCT
Northeastern	14	–	4	.778	20	–	13	.606
Towson*	13	–	5	.722	18	–	13	.581
Delaware	13	–	5	.722	19	–	14	.576
James Madison †	11	–	7	.611	21	–	15	.583
George Mason	10	–	8	.556	22	–	16	.579
Georgia State**	10	–	8	.556	15	–	16	.484
Drexel	9	–	9	.500	13	–	18	.419
William & Mary	7	–	11	.389	13	–	17	.433
UNC Wilmington*	5	–	13	.278	10	–	20	.333
Hofstra	4	–	14	.222	7	–	25	.219
Old Dominion**	3	–	15	.167	5	–	25	.167
† 2013 CAA tournament winner Rankings from AP poll *Ineligible for postseason play due to APR penalties **Ineligible for conference tournament due to changing conferences in 2013

The 2012–13 James Madison Dukes men's basketball team represented James Madison University during the 2012–13 NCAA Division I men's basketball season. The Dukes, led by fifth year head coach Matt Brady, played their home games at the James Madison University Convocation Center and were members of the Colonial Athletic Association. They finished the season 21–15, 11–7 in CAA play to finish in fourth place. They were champions of the CAA tournament, defeating Northeastern in the championship game, to earn an automatic bid to the 2013 NCAA tournament. They defeated Long Island in the First Four round before losing in the second round to Indiana.

== Roster ==
2012–13 James Madison Dukes men's basketball team
Players
Coaches

Pos.	#	Name	Height	Weight	Year	Hometown
G	0	AJ Davis	6 ft 6 in (1.98 m)	210 lb (95 kg)	Sr	Columbus, Ohio
F	1	Enoch Hood	6 ft 9 in (2.06 m)	210 lb (95 kg)	So	Norfolk, Virginia
G	2	Ron Curry	6 ft 4 in (1.93 m)	190 lb (86 kg)	Fr	Pennsauken, New Jersey
G	4	Charles Cooke	6 ft 6 in (1.98 m)	190 lb (86 kg)	Fr	Trenton, New Jersey
G	5	Alioune Diouf	6 ft 5 in (1.96 m)	220 lb (100 kg)	Sr	Powder Springs, Georgia
F	11	Andrey Semenov	6 ft 7 in (2.01 m)	200 lb (91 kg)	Sr	Saint Petersburg, Russia
G	14	Christian Pierce	6 ft 5 in (1.96 m)	205 lb (93 kg)	Jr	Ivy, Virginia
G	15	Andre Nation	6 ft 5 in (1.96 m)	200 lb (91 kg)	Fr	Plant City, Florida
F	21	Dimitrije Cabarkapa	6 ft 10 in (2.08 m)	245 lb (111 kg)	Fr	Novi Sad, Serbia
F	22	Taylor Bessick	6 ft 9 in (2.06 m)	230 lb (104 kg)	Fr	Philadelphia
G	30	Arman Marks	6 ft 4 in (1.93 m)	195 lb (88 kg)	So	Louisville, Kentucky
F	33	Rayshawn Goins	6 ft 6 in (1.98 m)	265 lb (120 kg)	Sr	Cleveland, Ohio
G	40	Devon Moore	6 ft 4 in (1.93 m)	175 lb (79 kg)	Sr	Columbus, Ohio
F/C	44	Gene Swindle	6 ft 11 in (2.11 m)	265 lb (120 kg)	Sr	Miami, Florida

Head coach

- Matt Brady (Siena)

Assistant coach(es)

- Rob O'Driscoll (Villanova)
- Mike Deane (SUNY Potsdam)
- Bill Phillips (Saint Joseph's)

Legend

- (C) Team captain
- (S) Suspended
- (I) Ineligible
- (W) Walk-on
- Injured
- Current redshirt

Roster
Last update: 2024-02-10

== Schedule ==
Date time, TV	Rank^{#}	Opponent^{#}	Result	Record	Site (attendance) city, state
Exhibition
10/28/2012*; 2:00 pm		Philadelphia	W 77–69		JMU Convocation Center; Harrisonburg, Virginia
Regular season
11/15/2012*; 11:00 pm, P12N		at No. 13 UCLA; Legends Classic	L 70–100	0–1	Pauley Pavilion (7,554); Los Angeles
11/19/2012*; 7:00 pm		at Duquesne; Legends Classic	L 88–90 ^{OT}	0–2	Palumbo Center (2,166); Pittsburgh
11/20/2012*; 4:30 pm		vs. Youngstown State; Legends Classic	W 69–68	1–2	Palumbo Center (2,060); Pittsburgh, Pennsylvania
11/21/2012*; 4:30 pm		vs. North Dakota State; Legends Classic	L 44–66	1–3	Palumbo Center (2,325); Pittsburgh
11/24/2012*; 12:00 pm		at Miami (OH)	L 58–76	1–4	Millett Hall (1,426); Oxford, Ohio
11/28/2012*; 7:00 pm		George Washington	L 53–54	1–5	JMU Convocation Center (3,314); Harrisonburg, Virginia
12/01/2012*; 4:00 pm		Winthrop	W 71–61	2–5	JMU Convocation Center (3,021); Harrisonburg, Virginia
12/05/2012*; 7:00 pm		East Tennessee State	W 70–45	3–5	JMU Convocation Center (2,599); Harrisonburg, Virginia
12/08/2012*; 7:00 pm		Richmond	L 82–83 ^{OT}	3–6	JMU Convocation Center (4,351); Harrisonburg, Virginia
12/16/2012*; 2:00 pm		UNC Greensboro	W 85–73	4–6	JMU Convocation Center (2,683); Harrisonburg, Virginia
12/22/2012*; 11:30 pm		vs. San Jose State; MGM Grand Garden Classic	W 77–68	5–6	MGM Grand Garden Arena (840); Paradise, Nevada
12/23/2012*; 6:30 pm		vs. San Diego; MGM Grand Garden Classic	W 62–59	6–6	MGM Grand Garden Arena (732); Paradise, Nevada
01/02/2013; 7:00 pm		at Old Dominion; Rivalry	W 58–55	7–6 (1–0)	Ted Constant Convocation Center (6,094); Norfolk, Virginia
01/05/2013; 2:00 pm		at Georgia State	L 52–68	7–7 (1–1)	GSU Sports Arena (1,030); Atlanta
01/07/2013*; 7:00 pm		at Hampton	L 65–69	7–8	Hampton Convocation Center (745); Hampton, Virginia
01/09/2013; 7:00 pm		UNC Wilmington	W 78–50	8–8 (2–1)	JMU Convocation Center (2,837); Harrisonburg, Virginia
01/12/2013; 4:00 pm, NBCSN		Drexel	W 51–43	9–8 (3–1)	JMU Convocation Center (3,213); Harrisonburg, Virginia
01/15/2013; 7:00 pm, CSNMA		at George Mason	L 57–68	9–9 (3–2)	Patriot Center (4,241); Fairfax, Virginia
01/19/2013; 12:00 pm		at Towson	L 47–73	9–10 (3–3)	Towson Center (1,677); Towson, Maryland
01/23/2013; 7:00 pm, CSNMA		Delaware	W 64–50	10–10 (4–3)	JMU Convocation Center (2,605); Harrisonburg, Virginia
01/26/2013; 4:00 pm, CSNMA		Old Dominion; Rivalry	W 56–46	11–10 (5–3)	JMU Convocation Center (3,848); Harrisonburg, Virginia
01/28/2013; 7:00 pm		at UNC Wilmington	W 63–56	12–10 (6–3)	Trask Coliseum (2,762); Wilmington, North Carolina
01/31/2013; 7:00 pm		Hofstra	W 62–41	13–10 (7–3)	JMU Convocation Center (2,986); Harrisonburg, Virginia
02/02/2013; 4:00 pm, CSNMA		George Mason	L 63–74	13–11 (7–4)	JMU Convocation Center (5,170); Harrisonburg, Virginia
02/06/2013; 7:00 pm		William & Mary	W 81–71	14–11 (8–4)	JMU Convocation Center (2,821); Harrisonburg, Virginia
02/10/2013; 7:00 pm, CSNMA		at Drexel	L 48–60	14–12 (8–5)	Daskalakis Athletic Center (1,793); Philadelphia
02/12/2013; 7:00 pm, CSNMA		Towson	W 75–70	15–12 (9–5)	JMU Convocation Center (2,957); Harrisonburg, Virginia
02/17/2013; 7:30 pm, CSNMA		at Delaware	W 72–71	16–12 (10–5)	Bob Carpenter Center (3,284); Newark, Delaware
02/20/2013; 7:00 pm, CSNMA		at Northeastern	L 64–66	16–13 (10–6)	Matthews Arena (3,463); Boston
02/23/2013; 4:00 pm		Georgia State	L 62–66	16–14 (10–7)	JMU Convocation Center (4,269); Harrisonburg, Virginia
03/02/2013; 6:00 pm, CSNMA		at William & Mary	W 69–67	17–14 (11–7)	Kaplan Arena (3,276); Williamsburg, Virginia
2013 CAA men's basketball tournament
03/09/2013; 8:30 pm, CSN		vs. William & Mary; Quarterfinals	W 72–67	18–14	Richmond Coliseum (4,655); Richmond, Virginia
03/10/2013; 4:30 pm, NBCSN		vs. Delaware; Semifinals	W 58–57	19–14	Richmond Coliseum (4,065); Richmond, Virginia
03/11/2013; 7:00 pm, NBCSN		vs. Northeastern; Championship Game	W 70–57	20–14	Richmond Coliseum (6,038); Richmond, Virginia
2013 NCAA tournament
03/20/2013*; 6:40 pm, truTV	No. (16 E)	vs. (16 E) Long Island; First Four	W 68–55	21–14	UD Arena (12,027); Dayton, Ohio
03/22/2013*; 4:22 pm, TBS	No. (16 E)	vs. No. 4 (1 E) Indiana; Second Round	L 62–83	21–15	UD Arena (12,353); Dayton, Ohio
*Non-conference game. ^{#}Rankings from AP Poll. (#) Tournament seedings in parentheses. All times are in Eastern Time. (#) during NCAA tournament is seed with Region E=East.
