= 2012–13 William & Mary Tribe men's basketball team =

American college basketball season

2012–13 William & Mary Tribe men's basketball
- Conference: Colonial Athletic Association
- Record: 13–17 (7–11 CAA)
- Head coach: Tony Shaver (10th season)
- Assistant coaches: Jonathan Holmes; Kotie Kimble; Austin Shaver
- Home arena: Kaplan Arena

2012–13 CAA men's basketball standings
	Conf.				Overall
Team	W		L	PCT	W		L	PCT
Northeastern	14	–	4	.778	20	–	13	.606
Towson*	13	–	5	.722	18	–	13	.581
Delaware	13	–	5	.722	19	–	14	.576
James Madison †	11	–	7	.611	21	–	15	.583
George Mason	10	–	8	.556	22	–	16	.579
Georgia State**	10	–	8	.556	15	–	16	.484
Drexel	9	–	9	.500	13	–	18	.419
William & Mary	7	–	11	.389	13	–	17	.433
UNC Wilmington*	5	–	13	.278	10	–	20	.333
Hofstra	4	–	14	.222	7	–	25	.219
Old Dominion**	3	–	15	.167	5	–	25	.167
† 2013 CAA tournament winner Rankings from AP poll *Ineligible for postseason play due to APR penalties **Ineligible for conference tournament due to changing conferences in 2013

The 2012–13 William & Mary Tribe men's basketball team represented The College of William & Mary during the 2012–13 NCAA Division I men's basketball season. The Tribe, led by tenth year head coach Tony Shaver, played their home games at Kaplan Arena and were members of the Colonial Athletic Association. They finished the regular season 13–16 overall and 7–11 in CAA conference play to finish in eighth place. They lost to James Madison in the quarterfinals of the CAA tournament. Following the season, sophomore guard Marcus Thornton was named to the second team all-CAA while junior forward Tim Rusthoven was named to the third team all-CAA.

== Preseason ==
The CAA coaches preseason poll, released on October 16, predicted William & Mary to finish in ninth place in the CAA. Guard Marcus Thornton, a sophomore, was selected to the preseason all conference second team.

== Roster ==
#	Name	Height	Weight (lbs.)	Position	Class	Hometown	Previous Team(s)
2	Julian Boatner	6'2"	185	G	Jr.	Bloomington, Indiana, United States	Bloomington High School North
3	Marcus Thornton	6'4"	170	G	So.	Upper Marlboro, Maryland, United States	Bishop McNamara High School
4	Matt Rum	6'4"	205	G	Sr.	Baltimore, Maryland, United States	Loyola Blakefield
5	Ben Whitlatch	6'1"	170	G	Jr.	Bloomington, Indiana, United States	Bloomington High School South
11	Doug Howard II	5'9"	160	G	Sr.	Leesburg, Virginia, United States	Flint Hill School
12	Brandon Britt	6'1"	182	G	Jr.	Chesapeake, Virginia, United States	Atlantic Shores Christian School
13	Andrew Pavloff	6'9"	240	F	Sr.	Akron, Ohio, United States	Walsh Jesuit High School
22	Tim Rusthoven	6'9"	230	F	Jr.	Winfield, Illinois, United States	Wheaton Academy
23	Kyle Gaillard	6'8"	220	F	Jr.	Huntersville, North Carolina, United States	North Mecklenburg High School
24	Fred Heldring	6'9"	240	F	Jr.	Winnetka, Illinois, United States	Menomonee Falls High School
25	Terry Tarpey	6'5"	185	G	Fr.	Stamford, Connecticut, United States	Fairfield College Preparatory School
30	Brett Goodloe	6'4"	190	G	Sr.	Staunton, Virginia, United States	St. Anne's-Belfield School
31	Sean Sheldon	6'9"	225	F	Fr.	Traverse City, Michigan, United States	St. Francis High School
43	Tom Schalk	6'8"	210	F	So.	Burnsville, Minnesota, United States	Apple Valley High School

== Schedule and results ==
Date time, TV	Opponent	Result	Record	Site (attendance) city, state
Regular Season
11/09/2012*; 7:30 pm	Hampton	W 69–51	1–0	Kaplan Arena (3,351); Williamsburg, Virginia
11/12/2012*; 7:00 pm, ESPN3	at Liberty	W 71–59	2–0	Vines Center (3,049); Lynchburg, Virginia
11/17/2012*; 7:00 pm	at High Point	W 83–61	3–0	Millis Center (1,734); High Point, North Carolina
11/21/2012*; 7:00 pm, NBCSN	Miami (OH)	L 59–72	3–1	Kaplan Arena (3,851); Williamsburg, Virginia
11/23/2012*; 7:00 pm, ESPN3	at Wake Forest	L 57–63	3–2	LJVM Coliseum (7,264); Winston-Salem, North Carolina
11/28/2012*; 7:00 pm	at Richmond	L 78–86 ^{2OT}	3–3	Robins Center (4,052); Richmond, Virginia
12/01/2012; 7:00 pm	Old Dominion	W 71–62	4–3 (1–0)	Kaplan Arena (3,106); Williamsburg, Virginia
12/06/2012*; 7:00 pm	Howard	W 78–69	5–3	Kaplan Arena (2,315); Williamsburg, Virginia
12/08/2012*; 2:00 pm	at Radford	W 60–55	6–3	Dedmon Center (1,573); Radford, Virginia
12/21/2012*; 7:00 pm	Salisbury	W 82–49	7–3	Kaplan Arena (3,326); Williamsburg, Virginia
12/29/2012*; 2:00 pm, ESPN3	at Purdue	L 66–73	7–4	Mackey Arena (10,185); West Lafayette, Indiana
1/02/2013*; 8:00 pm, ESPN3	at Vanderbilt	L 50–64	7–5	Memorial Gymnasium (9,965); Nashville, Tennessee
1/05/2013; 2:00 pm, CSNMA	George Mason	L 66–73	7–6 (1–1)	Kaplan Arena (3,506); Williamsburg, Virginia
1/09/2013; 7:00 pm	at Towson	L 86–99 ^{2OT}	7–7 (1–2)	Tiger Arena (1,008); Towson, Maryland
1/12/2013; 4:00 pm	at Hofstra	L 59–70	7–8 (1–3)	Mack Sports Complex (2,119); Hempstead, New York
1/16/2013; 7:00 pm	at Georgia State	L 58–74	7–9 (1–4)	GSU Sports Arena (2,350); Atlanta, Georgia
1/19/2013; 2:00 pm, CSNMA	Drexel	L 48–59	7–10 (1–5)	Kaplan Arena (3,215); Williamsburg, Virginia
1/23/2013; 7:00 pm	at Northeastern	L 91–95 ^{2OT}	7–11 (1–6)	Matthews Arena (1,004); Boston
1/26/2013; 7:00 pm	Towson	W 63–56	8–11 (2–6)	Kaplan Arena (3,091); Williamsburg, Virginia
1/30/2013; 7:00 pm	at Delaware	L 56–66	8–12 (2–7)	Bob Carpenter Center (2,413); Newark, Delaware
2/02/2013; 12:00 pm, CSNMA	Hofstra	W 72–59	9–12 (3–7)	Kaplan Arena (3,031); Williamsburg, Virginia
2/06/2013; 7:00 pm	at James Madison	L 71–81	9–13 (3–8)	James Madison University Convocation Center (2,821); Harrisonburg, Virginia
2/11/2013; 7:00 pm	Northeastern	L 64–68	9–14 (3–9)	Kaplan Arena (2,275); Williamsburg, Virginia
2/13/2013; 7:00 pm	UNC Wilmington	W 92–86	10–14 (4–9)	Kaplan Arena (2,332); Williamsburg, Virginia
2/16/2013; 12:00 pm, CSNMA	at Old Dominion	W 74–62	11–14 (5–9)	Ted Constant Convocation Center (7,872); Norfolk, Virginia
2/18/2013; 7:00 pm	Georgia State	W 75–63	12–14 (6–9)	Kaplan Arena (2,275); Williamsburg, Virginia
2/23/2013; 4:00 pm, CSNMA	at George Mason	L 58–60	12–15 (6–10)	Patriot Center (6,215); Fairfax, Virginia
2/27/2013; 7:00 pm	at UNC Wilmington	W 73–72	13–15 (7–10)	Trask Coliseum (3,468); Wilmington, North Carolina
3/02/2013; 6:00 pm	James Madison	L 67–69	13–16 (7–11)	Kaplan Arena (3,276); Williamsburg, Virginia
2013 CAA men's basketball tournament
03/09/2013; 8:30 pm, CSN	vs. James Madison; Quarterfinals	L 67–72	13–17	Richmond Coliseum (4,655); Richmond, Virginia
*Non-conference game. ^{#}Rankings from AP Poll. (#) Tournament seedings in parentheses. All times are in Eastern Time.
