= 2012–13 Georgia State Panthers men's basketball team =

American college basketball season

2012–13 Georgia State Panthers men's basketball
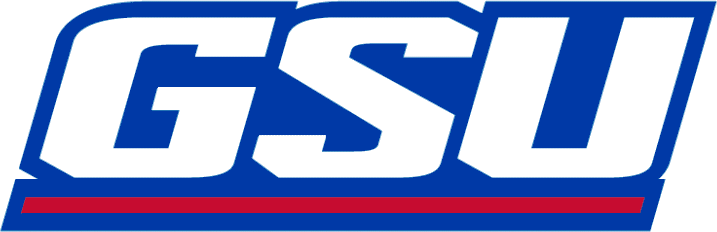
- Conference: Colonial Athletic Association
- Record: 15–16 (10–8 CAA)
- Head coach: Ron Hunter (2nd season)
- Assistant coaches: Darryl LaBarrie (2nd season); Everick Sullivan (2nd season); Claude Pardue (2nd season)
- Home arena: GSU Sports Arena

2012–13 CAA men's basketball standings
	Conf.				Overall
Team	W		L	PCT	W		L	PCT
Northeastern	14	–	4	.778	20	–	13	.606
Towson*	13	–	5	.722	18	–	13	.581
Delaware	13	–	5	.722	19	–	14	.576
James Madison †	11	–	7	.611	21	–	15	.583
George Mason	10	–	8	.556	22	–	16	.579
Georgia State**	10	–	8	.556	15	–	16	.484
Drexel	9	–	9	.500	13	–	18	.419
William & Mary	7	–	11	.389	13	–	17	.433
UNC Wilmington*	5	–	13	.278	10	–	20	.333
Hofstra	4	–	14	.222	7	–	25	.219
Old Dominion**	3	–	15	.167	5	–	25	.167
† 2013 CAA tournament winner Rankings from AP poll *Ineligible for postseason play due to APR penalties **Ineligible for conference tournament due to changing conferences in 2013

The 2012–13 Georgia State Panthers men's basketball team represented Georgia State University during the 2012–13 NCAA Division I men's basketball season. The team's head coach was Ron Hunter in his second season at GSU. They played their home games at the GSU Sports Arena and were members of the Colonial Athletic Association (CAA). This was their final year in the CAA before moving to the Sun Belt Conference. They finished the season 15–16, 10–8 in CAA play to finish in a tie for fifth place.

== Season notes ==
- This was the final season that the Panthers played in the Colonial Athletic Association. The 2013-14 season was played in the Sun Belt Conference.
- Due to Georgia State's withdrawal from the CAA, the Men's Basketball team was ineligible for the CAA tournament (and therefore for the CAA's automatic bid to the NCAA tournament).
- During the November 19 game against Monmouth, James Vincent tied GSU's total blocked shots in a game record at 9.
- The game against Liberty on December 2 marked Coach Ron Hunter's 300th career win.
- On February 2 during GSU's win against Old Dominion, freshman (and coaches son) R. J. Hunter broke the team record for 3 point goals made, setting the new record at 10. The previous record was 9. This also tied the CAA record for most 3 point field goals during a game. During the same game Hunter set a season high CAA record for points in a game at 38 points.
- R. J. Hunter broke the freshman scoring record with 527 points for the season. The previous record was held by Matt O'Brien with 515 points.
- By the final game of the season, junior Devonte White became the 17th player in school history to reach 1000 points.

== Roster ==
2012–13 Georgia State Panthers men's basketball team
Players
Coaches

Pos.	#	Name	Height	Weight	Year	Hometown
F	1	LaRon Smith	6 ft 8 in (2.03 m)	190 lb (86 kg)	Fr	Palm Bay, FL
G	2	Ryann Green	6 ft 1 in (1.85 m)	171 lb (78 kg)	So	College Park, GA
G	10	Kevin Shaw	6 ft 2 in (1.88 m)	170 lb (77 kg)	Sr	Louisville, KY
G	12	Devonta White	5 ft 10 in (1.78 m)	158 lb (72 kg)	Jr	Alpharetta, GA
G	15	Tyler Gamble	6 ft 2 in (1.88 m)	195 lb (88 kg)	So	Commerce, GA
F	20	David Travers	6 ft 0 in (1.83 m)	170 lb (77 kg)	Fr	Carlsbad, CA
G	21	Cameron Solomon	6 ft 3 in (1.91 m)	170 lb (77 kg)	So	Hampton, GA
G	22	R. J. Hunter	6 ft 5 in (1.96 m)	175 lb (79 kg)	Fr	Indianapolis, IN
F	23	Manny Atkins	6 ft 7 in (2.01 m)	205 lb (93 kg)	RS Jr	Tucker, GA
G	25	Rashaard Richardson	6 ft 4 in (1.93 m)	179 lb (81 kg)	Jr	Charleston, SC
F	31	TJ Shipes	6 ft 7 in (2.01 m)	225 lb (102 kg)	Fr	Buford, GA
F	33	Markus Crider	6 ft 6 in (1.98 m)	205 lb (93 kg)	Fr	Dayton, OH
F	34	Justin Green	6 ft 6 in (1.98 m)	105 lb (48 kg)	So	Jonesboro, GA
F	42	Curtis Washington	6 ft 9 in (2.06 m)	230 lb (104 kg)	RS So	Elizabethtown, KY
F	45	Denny Burguillos	6 ft 7 in (2.01 m)	230 lb (104 kg)	Jr	Valencia, Venezuela
C	50	James Vincent	6 ft 10 in (2.08 m)	260 lb (118 kg)	Sr	Columbus, GA

Head coach

- Ron Hunter (Miami (Ohio))

Assistant coach(es)

- Darryl LaBarrie (Georgia Tech)
- Everick Sullivan (Louisville)
- Claude Pardue (Emory)

Legend

- (C) Team captain
- (S) Suspended
- (I) Ineligible
- (W) Walk-on
- Injured
- Current redshirt

== Schedule ==
Date time, TV	Opponent	Result	Record	Site city, state
Exhibition
October 29*; 7:00 pm	Life	W 85–62		GSU Sports Arena; Atlanta, GA
November 4*; 6:00 pm	Albany State	W 80–60		GSU Sports Arena; Atlanta, GA
Regular Season
November 9*; 7:00 pm, ESPNU	at No. 8 Duke	L 55–74	0–1	Cameron Indoor Stadium (9,314); Durham, NC
November 13*; 9:00 pm, BYUtv	at BYU; Coaches vs. Cancer Classic	L 62–80	0–2	Marriott Center (13,181); Provo, UT
November 19*; 7:00 pm	vs. Monmouth; Coaches vs. Cancer Classic	W 62–49	1–2	GSU Sports Arena (1,119); Atlanta, GA
November 20*; 7:00 pm	Tennessee State; Coaches vs. Cancer Classic	W 59–57	2–2	GSU Sports Arena (1,104); Atlanta, GA
November 21*; 3:00 pm	South Alabama; Coaches vs. Cancer Classic	W 75–73	3–2	GSU Sports Arena (1,028); Atlanta, GA
November 26*; 7:00 pm	East Carolina	L 53–62	3–3	GSU Sports Arena (1,759); Atlanta, GA
November 30*; 7:00 pm	Louisiana Tech	L 68–86	3–4	GSU Sports Arena (2,015); Atlanta, GA
December 2*; 3:00 pm, MASN/ESPN3	at Liberty	W 67–66	4–4	Vines Center (1,717); Lynchburg, VA
December 8*; 2:00 pm	Southern Poly	W 86–58	5–4	GSU Sports Arena (1,188); Atlanta, GA
December 15*; 8:00 pm	at Troy	L 56–57	5–5	Trojan Arena (1,212); Troy, AL
December 18*; 7:00 pm	Southern Miss	L 67–69	5–6	GSU Sports Arena (1,167); Atlanta, GA
December 22*; 2:00 pm	at Rhode Island	L 60–65	5–7	Ryan Center (3,822); Kingston, RI
December 29*; 3:00 pm	at Georgia Southern	L 64–68 ^{OT}	5–8	Hanner Fieldhouse (1,129); Statesboro, GA
January 2; 7:00 pm	Drexel	L 60–77	5–9 (0–1)	GSU Sports Arena (1,030); Atlanta, GA
January 5; 2:00 pm	James Madison	W 68–52	6–9 (1–1)	GSU Sports Arena (1,030); Atlanta, GA
January 7; 7:00 pm	at Hofstra	L 50–52	6–10 (1–2)	Mack Sports Complex (1,169); Hempstead, NY
January 12; 12:00 pm, CSS	Delaware	L 83–86	6–11 (1–3)	GSU Sports Arena (1,075); Atlanta, GA
January 16; 7:00 pm	William & Mary	W 74–58	7–11 (2–3)	GSU Sports Arena (2,350); Atlanta, GA
January 19; 7:00 pm	at Old Dominion	W 69–54	8–11 (3–3)	Ted Constant Convocation Center (6,493); Norfolk, VA
January 21; 7:00 pm	at Towson	W 71–69	9–11 (4–3)	Towson Center (1,441); Towson, MD
January 23; 7:00 pm	UNCW	W 81–63	10–11 (5–3)	GSU Sports Arena (1,427); Atlanta, GA
January 26; 12:00 pm	at Drexel	L 57–68	10–12 (5–4)	Daskalakis Athletic Center (2,532); Philadelphia, PA
January 30; 7:00 pm	at Northeastern	W 78–73	11–12 (6–4)	Matthews Arena (1,845); Boston, MA
February 2; 2:00 pm	Old Dominion	W 83–63	12–12 (7–4)	GSU Sports Arena (2,140); Atlanta, GA
February 6; 7:00 pm	at UNCW	L 72–76	12–13 (7–5)	Trask Coliseum (2,767); Wilmington, NC
February 9; 2:00 pm	Towson	L 82–90 ^{OT}	12–14 (7–6)	GSU Sports Arena (1,772); Atlanta, GA
February 13; 7:00 pm	Hofstra	W 61–43	13–14 (8–6)	GSU Sports Arena (1,384); Atlanta, GA
February 16; 4:00 pm, CSS	at George Mason	W 78–60	14–14 (9–6)	Patriot Center (8,010); Fairfax, VA
February 18; 7:00 pm	at William & Mary	L 63–75	14–15 (9–7)	William & Mary Hall (2,275); Williamsburg, VA
February 23; 4:00 pm	at James Madison	W 66–62	15–15 (10–7)	James Madison University Convocation Center (4,269); Harrisonburg, VA
February 27; 7:00 pm	Northeastern	L 84–90 ^{OT}	15–16 (10–8)	GSU Sports Arena (1,576); Atlanta, GA
*Non-conference game. ^{#}Rankings from AP Poll. (#) Tournament seedings in parentheses. All times are in Eastern Time.
