= 2012–13 UNC Wilmington Seahawks men's basketball team =

American college basketball season

2012–13 UNC Wilmington Seahawks men's basketball
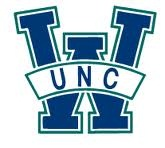
- Conference: Colonial Athletic Association
- Record: 10–20 (5–13 CAA)
- Head coach: Buzz Peterson (3rd season)
- Assistant coaches: Jamie Kachmarik; Dante Calabria; Andre Gray
- Home arena: Trask Coliseum

2012–13 CAA men's basketball standings
| | Conf. | | | | Overall |
| Team | W | | L | PCT | W | | L | PCT |
|---|---|---|---|---|---|---|---|---|
| Northeastern | 14 | – | 4 | .778 | 20 | – | 13 | .606 |
| Towson* | 13 | – | 5 | .722 | 18 | – | 13 | .581 |
| Delaware | 13 | – | 5 | .722 | 19 | – | 14 | .576 |
| James Madison † | 11 | – | 7 | .611 | 21 | – | 15 | .583 |
| George Mason | 10 | – | 8 | .556 | 22 | – | 16 | .579 |
| Georgia State** | 10 | – | 8 | .556 | 15 | – | 16 | .484 |
| Drexel | 9 | – | 9 | .500 | 13 | – | 18 | .419 |
| William & Mary | 7 | – | 11 | .389 | 13 | – | 17 | .433 |
| UNC Wilmington* | 5 | – | 13 | .278 | 10 | – | 20 | .333 |
| Hofstra | 4 | – | 14 | .222 | 7 | – | 25 | .219 |
| Old Dominion** | 3 | – | 15 | .167 | 5 | – | 25 | .167 |
† 2013 CAA tournament winner Rankings from AP poll *Ineligible for postseason play due to APR penalties **Ineligible for conference tournament due to changing conferences in 2013

The 2012–13 UNC Wilmington Seahawks men's basketball team represented the University of North Carolina Wilmington during the 2012–13 NCAA Division I men's basketball season. The Seahawks, led by third year head coach Buzz Peterson, played their home games at the Trask Coliseum and were members of the Colonial Athletic Association.

Due to low Academic Progress Rate scores, the Seahawks were ineligible for post season play, including the CAA Tournament. They finished the season 10–20, 5–13 in CAA play to finish in ninth place.

== Roster ==
| Number | Name | Position | Height | Weight | Year | Hometown |
|---|---|---|---|---|---|---|
| 0 | C.J. Gettys | Center | 7–0 | 280 | Freshman | Findlay, Ohio |
| 1 | Chris Dixon | Guard | 6–0 | 188 | Freshman | Montgomery, Alabama |
| 2 | Keith Rendleman | Forward | 6–8 | 220 | Senior | Denver, North Carolina |
| 3 | Tyree Graham | Guard | 6–1 | 225 | Graduate | Durham, North Carolina |
| 4 | Matt Wilson | Forward | 7–0 | 240 | Senior | Raleigh, North Carolina |
| 10 | Freddie Jackson | Guard | 6–4 | 182 | Sophomore | Wilmington, North Carolina |
| 12 | Tanner Milson | Guard | 6–2 | 190 | Junior | Cedar Hill, Texas |
| 15 | Luke Hager | Forward | 6–8 | 205 | Freshman | Chicago, Illinois |
| 20 | Dylan Sherwood | Forward | 6–9 | 218 | Freshman | Pittsford, New York |
| 22 | Nate Anderson | Forward | 6–10 | 240 | Sophomore | Ashville, Ohio |
| 23 | Craig Ponder | Guard | 6–1 | 185 | Freshman | Bluefield, West Virginia |
| 30 | Zack Allen | Guard | 5–11 | 195 | Junior | Wilmington, North Carolina |
| 33 | Shane Reybold | Forward | 6–8 | 238 | Junior | Laurel, Maryland |
| 34 | Marcus Graham | Guard | 6–6 | 168 | Junior | Roseboro, North Carolina |
| 40 | Cedrick Williams | Forward | 6–9 | 220 | Sophomore | Murfreesboro, Tennessee |
| 41 | Alex Kilmartin | Forward | 6–7 | 202 | Freshman | Charlotte, North Carolina |

== Schedule ==
| Date time, TV | Opponent | Result | Record | Site (attendance) city, state |
Exhibition
| 11/03/2012*; 2:00 pm | North Carolina Wesleyan | W 90–51 | | Trask Coliseum (2,553); Wilmington, North Carolina |
Regular Season
| 11/11/2012*; 2:00 pm | UNC Asheville | W 67–59 | 1–0 | Trask Coliseum (3,052); Wilmington, North Carolina |
| 11/13/2012*; 7:00 pm | at Richmond | L 58–101 | 1–1 | Robins Center (3,753); Richmond, Virginia |
| 11/16/2012*; 7:00 pm | at Ohio | L 47–85 | 1–2 | Convocation Center (6,317); Athens, Ohio |
| 11/21/2012*; 7:00 pm, BTN | at Purdue | L 40–66 | 1–3 | Mackey Arena (9,386); West Lafayette, Indiana |
| 11/24/2012*; 2:00 pm | Wofford | W 49–37 | 2–3 | Trask Coliseum (2,876); Wilmington, North Carolina |
| 11/25/2012*; 2:00 pm | Hampton | W 61–60 | 3–3 | Trask Coliseum (2,596); Wilmington, North Carolina |
| 12/01/2012*; 7:00 pm | at Marshall | L 58–61 | 3–4 | Cam Henderson Center (5,689); Huntington, West Virginia |
| 12/05/2012*; 8:00 pm | Coker | W 62–47 | 4–4 | Trask Coliseum (2,769); Wilmington, North Carolina |
| 12/08/2012*; 7:00 pm, ESPN3 | at Georgia Tech | L 66–73 | 4–5 | McCamish Pavilion (5,982); Atlanta |
| 12/15/2012*; 7:00 pm | at Davidson | L 61–77 | 4–6 | John M. Belk Arena (4,028); Davidson, North Carolina |
| 12/19/2012*; 7:00 pm | UNC Greensboro | W 87–73 | 5–6 | Trask Coliseum (3,497); Wilmington, North Carolina |
| 12/29/2012*; 1:00 pm | at Campbell | L 60–72 | 5–7 | John W. Pope, Jr. Convocation Center (1,895); Buies Creek, North Carolina |
| 01/02/2013; 7:00 pm | Towson | L 74–79 | 5–8 (0–1) | Trask Coliseum (3,331); Wilmington, North Carolina |
| 01/05/2013; 1:00 pm | at Northeastern | L 64–68 | 5–9 (0–2) | Matthews Arena (2,482); Boston |
| 01/09/2013; 7:00 pm | at James Madison | L 50–78 | 5–10 (0–3) | JMU Convocation Center (2,837); Harrisonburg, Virginia |
| 01/12/2013; 2:00 pm, CAA-TV, CSN-MA, WCET | George Mason | W 82–74 | 6–10 (1–3) | Trask Coliseum (3,031); Wilmington, North Carolina |
| 01/16/2013; 7:00 pm | Old Dominion | W 65–60 | 7–10 (2–3) | Trask Coliseum (3,832); Wilmington, North Carolina |
| 01/23/2013; 7:00 pm | Georgia State | L 63–81 | 7–11 (2–4) | GSU Sports Arena (1,427); Atlanta |
| 01/26/2013; 2:00 pm | at Hofstra | W 57–51 | 8–11 (3–4) | Mack Sports Complex (2,173); Hempstead, New York |
| 01/28/2013; 7:00 pm | James Madison | L 56–63 | 8–12 (3–5) | Trask Coliseum (2,762); Wilmington, North Carolina |
| 02/02/2013; 2:00 pm | at Delaware | L 56–71 | 8–13 (3–6) | Bob Carpenter Center (2,396); Newark, Delaware |
| 02/04/2013; 7:00 pm | at Towson | L 68–81 | 8–14 (3–7) | Towson Center (1,368); Towson, Maryland |
| 02/06/2013; 7:00 pm | at Georgia State | W 76–72 | 9–14 (4–7) | Trask Coliseum (2,767); Wilmington, North Carolina |
| 02/09/2013; 12:00 pm, CAATV, CSN-MA+, CSN-NE, MSG, WCET | Hofstra | L 56–65 | 9–15 (4–8) | Trask Coliseum (2,901); Wilmington, North Carolina |
| 02/13/2013; 7:00 pm | at William & Mary | L 86–92 | 9–16 (4–9) | Kaplan Arena (2,332); Williamsburg, Virginia |
| 02/16/2013; 7:00 pm | Northeastern | W 73–67 | 10–16 (5–9) | Trask Coliseum (3,730); Wilmington, North Carolina |
| 02/20/2013; 7:00 pm | at Old Dominion | L 61–84 | 10–17 (5–10) | Ted Constant Convocation Center (5,951); Norfolk, Virginia |
| 02/23/2013; 7:00 pm | Delaware | L 78–79 | 10–18 (5–11) | Trask Coliseum (3,432); Wilmington, North Carolina |
| 02/27/2013; 7:00 pm | William & Mary | L 72–73 | 10–19 (5–12) | Trask Coliseum (3,468); Wilmington, North Carolina |
| 03/02/2013; 7:00 pm | at Drexel | L 46–62 | 10–20 (5–13) | Daskalakis Athletic Center (2,011); Philadelphia |
*Non-conference game. ^{#}Rankings from AP Poll. (#) Tournament seedings in parentheses. All times are in Eastern Time.
