= Matt Brady =

American basketball coach (born 1965)

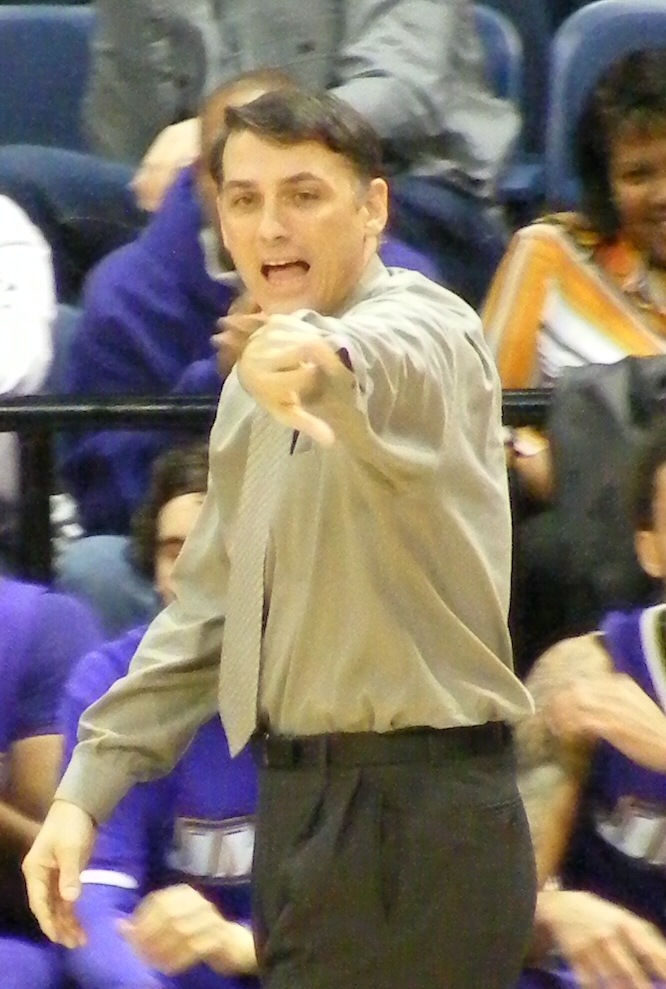
- Brady during a 2009 game at Old Dominion University

Current position
- Title: Assistant coach
- Team: Boston University
- Conference: Patriot League

Biographical details
- Born: October 1, 1965 (age 61); Haddon Heights, New Jersey, U.S.

Playing career
- 1983–1987: Siena

Coaching career (HC unless noted)
- 1987–1989: Rhode Island (assistant)
- 1989–1993: Wagner (assistant)
- 1993–2004: Saint Joseph's (assistant)
- 2004–2008: Marist
- 2008–2016: James Madison
- 2016–2017: La Salle (assistant)
- 2018–2022: Maryland (assistant)
- 2022–2023: Oklahoma (assistant)
- 2023: Temple (assistant)
- 2023–2024: DePaul (special asst. to HC)
- 2024: DePaul (interim HC)
- 2024–2025: High Point (assistant)
- 2025–present: Boston University (assistant)

Administrative career (AD unless noted)
- 2017–2018: Maryland (dir. player personnel)

Head coaching record
- Overall: 211–189 (.528)
- Tournaments: 1–1 (NCAA Tournament); 1–1 (NIT); 0–1 (CBI); 2–2 (CIT)

Accomplishments and honors

Championships
- MAAC regular season (2007); CAA tournament (2013); CAA regular season (2015)

Awards
- MAAC Coach of the Year (2007)

Matt Brady (born October 1, 1965) is an American college basketball coach who is an assistant for the Boston University Terriers. He is a former head coach at James Madison, Marist and DePaul, the latter on an interim basis.

== Career ==
=== Early career ===
After playing basketball for Siena, Brady worked as assistant at Rhode Island, Wagner, and Saint Joseph's.

=== Marist ===
Brady was hired as head coach by Marist in 2004 and coached the Foxes for four years, finishing with a 73–50 record. He took the Red Foxes to a MAAC regular-season championship in 2007. Marist then advanced to the NIT, where it defeated Oklahoma State in the first round. The NIT victory was the first ever postseason victory for Marist.

=== James Madison ===
Brady was introduced as head coach of James Madison at a press conference on March 26, 2008. After leaving Marist, the school filed suit against Brady, arguing he had violated the terms of the contract by accepting the JMU job and bringing certain players with him to the Dukes. A jury found in favor of Marist, but did not award any damages.

At Madison, Brady took over a program that had not had a winning record since going 20–9 in the 1999–2000 season under Sherman Dillard. In 2009, Brady inherited an experienced core of upperclassmen from Keener and, with a skilled group of freshmen, engineered a respectable inaugural campaign, leading the Dukes to an 18–13 regular season record. Thanks to the addition of a new postseason invitational—the CollegeInsider.com Tournament—Madison achieved its first 20-win season since 1994, when Hall of Fame coach Lefty Driesell led the program to the NCAA tournament.

The record dipped significantly in 2009–10, in part because of the loss of two key players to injuries: point guard Devon Moore, an all-rookie pick in the CAA in 2009, and forward Andrey Semenov. After up and down season in 2011 and 2012, the Dukes won the CAA tournament in 2013 after finishing in fourth place in the CAA regular season. As a result, they received the conference's automatic bid to the NCAA tournament where they defeated Long Island in the First Four marking the school's first NCAA Tournament win since 1983. In the Second Round of the Tournament, they lost to No. 1 seed Indiana.

After another down season in 2014, the Dukes finished in a first place tie in the CAA regular season, but could not win the CAA tournament, and received a bid to the CIT tournament where they lost in the first round.

Despite a 21-win season in 2016, Brady was fired due to allegedly declining attendance at Dukes' games.

=== Recent years ===
Following his dismissal from the Dukes, Brady was hired as an assistant coach for La Salle University. In July 2017, Brady was hired to be the Director of Player Personnel at Maryland. In 2018, he was promoted to assistant coach.

== Head coaching record ==
Record table
Season	Team	Overall	Conference	Standing	Postseason
Marist Red Foxes (Metro Atlantic Athletic Conference) (2004–2008)
2004–05	Marist	11–17	8–10	T–7th	
2005–06	Marist	19–10	12–6	3rd	
2006–07	Marist	25–9	14–4	1st	NIT second round
2007–08	Marist	18–14	11–7	T–5th	
Marist:		73–50 (.593)	45–27 (.625)		
James Madison Dukes (Colonial Athletic Association) (2008–2016)
2008–09	James Madison	21–15	9–9	7th	CIT semifinals
2009–10	James Madison	13–20	4–14	11th	
2010–11	James Madison	21–12	10–8	6th	CBI first round
2011–12	James Madison	12–20	5–13	8th	
2012–13	James Madison	21–15	11–7	4th	NCAA Division I second round
2013–14	James Madison	11–20	6–10	7th	
2014–15	James Madison	19–14	12–6	T–1st	CIT first round
2015–16	James Madison	21–11	11–7	T–3rd	
James Madison:		138–125 (.525)	67–73 (.479)		
DePaul Blue Demons (Big East Conference) (2024)
2023–24	DePaul	0–14	0–13	11th	
DePaul:		0–14 (.000)	0–13 (.000)		
Total:		211–189 (.528)			
National champion Postseason invitational champion Conference regular season champion Conference regular season and conference tournament champion Division regular season champion Division regular season and conference tournament champion Conference tournament champion
