= 2012–13 Drexel Dragons men's basketball team =

American college basketball season

2012–13 Drexel Dragons men's basketball
- Conference: Colonial Athletic Association
- Record: 13–18 (9–9 CAA)
- Head coach: Bruiser Flint (12th season)
- Assistant coaches: Mike Connors (5th season); Matt Collier (3rd season); Bobby Jordan (1st season)
- MVP: Damion Lee
- Home arena: Daskalakis Athletic Center

2012–13 CAA men's basketball standings
	Conf.				Overall
Team	W		L	PCT	W		L	PCT
Northeastern	14	–	4	.778	20	–	13	.606
Towson*	13	–	5	.722	18	–	13	.581
Delaware	13	–	5	.722	19	–	14	.576
James Madison †	11	–	7	.611	21	–	15	.583
George Mason	10	–	8	.556	22	–	16	.579
Georgia State**	10	–	8	.556	15	–	16	.484
Drexel	9	–	9	.500	13	–	18	.419
William & Mary	7	–	11	.389	13	–	17	.433
UNC Wilmington*	5	–	13	.278	10	–	20	.333
Hofstra	4	–	14	.222	7	–	25	.219
Old Dominion**	3	–	15	.167	5	–	25	.167
† 2013 CAA tournament winner Rankings from AP poll *Ineligible for postseason play due to APR penalties **Ineligible for conference tournament due to changing conferences in 2013

The 2012–13 Drexel Dragons men's basketball team represented Drexel University during the 2012–13 NCAA Division I men's basketball season. The Dragons, led by 12th year head coach Bruiser Flint, played their home games at Daskalakis Athletic Center and were members of the Colonial Athletic Association. They finished the season 13–18, 9–9 in CAA play to finish in seventh place. They lost in the quarterfinals of the CAA tournament to George Mason.

== Roster ==
Number	Name	Position	Height	Weight	Year	Hometown
1	Kazembe Abif	Center	6–7	210	Sophomore	Elizabeth, New Jersey
2	Aquil Younger	Guard	6–0	163	Sophomore	Philadelphia
3	Chris Fouch	Guard	6–2	185	Senior	New York City
4	Frantz Massenat	Guard	6–4	185	Junior	Ewing, New Jersey
5	Stevan Manojlovic	Guard	6–5	197	Junior	Toronto, Ontario
11	Tavon Allen	Forward	6–7	185	Freshman	New Haven, Connecticut
13	Goran Pantovic	Forward	6–10	225	Junior	Belgrade, Serbia
14	Damion Lee	Guard	6–6	195	Sophomore	Baltimore, Maryland
20	Casey Carroll	Forward	6–8	225	Freshman	Canfield, Ohio
22	Jake Lerner	Guard	6–2	190	Junior	Philadelphia
32	Derrick Thomas	Guard	6–4	195	Senior	New York City
35	Dartaye Ruffin	Forward	6–8	250	Junior	Stoughton, Massachusetts
44	Daryl McCoy	Forward	6–9	280	Senior	Hartford, Connecticut

== Schedule ==
Date time, TV	Rank^{#}	Opponent^{#}	Result	Record	Site (attendance) city, state
Regular Season
11/09/2012*; 7:00 pm	No. RV	at Kent State	L 62–66 ^{OT}	0–1	Memorial Athletic and Convocation Center (2,650); Kent, OH
11/15/2012*; 7:00 pm, NBCSN		Illinois State	L 84–86 ^{OT}	0–2	Daskalakis Athletic Center (2,532); Philadelphia, PA
11/17/2012*; 4:00 pm		at Penn; Battle of 33rd Street	W 61–59	1–2	Palestra (5,608); Philadelphia, PA
11/22/2012*; 4:30 pm, ESPN2		vs. Saint Mary's; DIRECTV Classic First Round	L 64–76	1–3	Anaheim Convention Center (1,107); Anaheim, CA
11/23/2012*; 6:00 pm, ESPNU		vs. Xavier; DIRECTV Classic consolation round	L 65–69	1–4	Anaheim Convention Center (1,477); Anaheim, CA
11/25/2012*; 4:00 pm, ESPN3		vs. Rice; DIRECTV Classic 7th place game	W 55–47	2–4	Anaheim Convention Center (2,527); Anaheim, CA
12/01/2012*; 12:00 pm		Rider	L 66–75	2–5	Daskalakis Athletic Center (1,871); Philadelphia, PA
12/04/2012*; 8:00 pm		at Tennessee State	L 66–76	2–6	Gentry Complex (1,011); Nashville, TN
12/08/2012*; 2:00 pm		at Princeton	W 64–57	3–6	Jadwin Gymnasium (1,970); Princeton, NJ
12/16/2012*; 4:00 pm		at Fairfield	L 58–69	3–7	Webster Bank Arena (1,310); Bridgeport, CT
12/22/2012*; 8:00 pm, NBCSN		Davidson	W 69–58	4–7	Daskalakis Athletic Center (1,879); Philadelphia, PA
12/31/2012*; 4:00 pm, TCN		Saint Joseph's	L 49–63	4–8	Daskalakis Athletic Center (2,532); Philadelphia, PA
01/02/2013; 7:00 pm		at Georgia State	W 77–60	5–8 (1–0)	GSU Sports Arena (1,030); Atlanta, GA
01/05/2013; 4:00 pm		Towson	L 66–69	5–9 (1–1)	Daskalakis Athletic Center (2,071); Philadelphia, PA
01/08/2013; 7:00 pm, CSNMA/TCN		Northeastern	L 58–63 ^{OT}	5–10 (1–2)	Daskalakis Athletic Center (1,923); Philadelphia, PA
01/12/2013; 4:00 pm, NBCSN		at James Madison	L 43–51	5–11 (1–3)	JMU Convocation Center (3,213); Harrisonburg, VA
01/19/2013; 2:00 pm, CSNMA/TCN		at William & Mary	W 59–48	6–11 (2–3)	Kaplan Arena (3,215); Williamsburg, VA
01/23/2013; 7:00 pm		at Hofstra	W 55–52	7–11 (3–3)	Mack Sports Complex (1,543); Hempstead, New York
01/26/2013; 12:00 pm		Georgia State; Homecoming	W 68–57	8–11 (4–3)	Daskalakis Athletic Center (2,532); Philadelphia, PA
01/28/2013; 7:00 pm, NBCSN		Delaware	L 64–66	8–12 (4–4)	Daskalakis Athletic Center (1,569); Philadelphia, PA
01/31/2013; 7:00 pm, NBCSN		at George Mason	W 58–54	9–12 (5–4)	Patriot Center (4,365); Fairfax, VA
02/02/2013; 6:00 pm, CSNMA/TCN		at Northeastern	L 52–59	9–13 (5–5)	Matthews Arena (2,448); Boston, MA
02/07/2013; 7:00 pm, NBCSN		Old Dominion	L 66–78	9–14 (5–6)	Daskalakis Athletic Center (1,953); Philadelphia, PA
02/10/2013; 7:00 pm, CSNMA		James Madison	W 60–48	10–14 (6–6)	Daskalakis Athletic Center (1,793); Philadelphia, PA
02/14/2013; 7:00 pm, CBSSN		George Mason	L 62–68	10–15 (6–7)	Daskalakis Athletic Center (1,623); Philadelphia, PA
02/18/2013; 7:00 pm, NBCSN		Hofstra	W 63–54	11–15 (7–7)	Daskalakis Athletic Center (1,744); Philadelphia, PA
02/21/2013; 7:00 pm, NBCSN		at Delaware	L 71–73 ^{2OT}	11–16 (7–8)	Bob Carpenter Center (2,393); Newark, DE
02/23/2013; 12:00 pm		at Towson	L 71–72	11–17 (7–9)	Towson Center (1,822); Towson, MD
02/28/2013; 7:00 pm, NBCSN		at Old Dominion	W 81–77	12–17 (8–9)	Ted Constant Convocation Center (6,474); Norfolk, VA
03/02/2013; 7:00 pm		UNC Wilmington	W 62–46	13–17 (9–9)	Daskalakis Athletic Center (2,011); Philadelphia, PA
CAA tournament
03/09/2013; 3:30 pm, CSNMA	(5)	vs. (4) George Mason; Quarterfinals	L 54–60	13–18	Richmond Coliseum (4,655); Richmond, VA
*Non-conference game. ^{#}Rankings from AP Poll. (#) Tournament seedings in parentheses. All times are in Eastern Time.

== Rankings ==
Ranking movement Legend: ██ Increase in ranking. ██ Decrease in ranking. ██ Not ranked the previous week. RV=Others receiving votes.
Poll	Pre	Wk 2	Wk 3	Wk 4	Wk 5	Wk 6	Wk 7	Wk 8	Wk 9	Wk 10	Wk 11	Wk 12	Wk 13	Wk 14	Wk 15	Wk 16	Wk 17	Wk 18	Wk 19	Post	Final
AP	RV																				N/A
Coaches	RV																				

== Awards ==
Damion Lee

- CAA All-Conference Second Team
- CAA Player of the Week (2)

Frantz Massenat

- CAA All-Conference Second Team
