= Bruiser Flint =

American men's college basketball coach (born 1965)

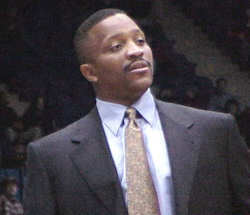

Current position
- Title: Assistant coach
- Team: Arkansas
- Conference: SEC

Biographical details
- Born: July 23, 1965 (age 61); Philadelphia, Pennsylvania, U.S.
- Education: St. Joseph's University

Playing career
- 1983–1987: Saint Joseph's

Coaching career (HC unless noted)
- 1987–1989: Coppin State (assistant)
- 1989–1996: UMass (assistant)
- 1996–2001: UMass
- 2001–2016: Drexel
- 2017–2020: Indiana (assistant)
- 2020–2024: Kentucky (assistant)
- 2024–present: Arkansas (assistant)

Head coaching record
- Overall: 331–289
- Tournaments: 0–2 (NCAA Division I); 2–6 (NIT)

Accomplishments and honors

Championships
- CAA regular season (2012)

Awards
- 4× CAA Coach of the Year (2002, 2004, 2009, 2012); 4× NABC District Coach of the Year (1998, 2007, 2009, 2012)

James "Bruiser" Flint (born July 23, 1965) is an American men's college basketball coach, currently an assistant coach at Arkansas. He was previously a head coach at UMass and Drexel.

== High School playing career ==
Flint is a 1983 graduate of Episcopal Academy. While attending Episcopal, Flint was a member of the school's varsity basketball team. Flint was named to Third team all-State as a senior and First team all-Philadelphia. Flint played under legendary coach Dan Dougherty.

== Collegiate playing career ==
Flint is a 1987 graduate of Saint Joseph's University. While attending St. Joe's, Flint was a member of the school's varsity basketball team. Flint was named to the all-Atlantic 10 team as a senior, and was inducted into the St. Joe's athletic hall of fame in 1988.

== Early coaching career ==
In 1987, Flint became an assistant coach at Coppin State University. Two years later, Flint became an assistant coach under John Calipari at the University of Massachusetts Amherst (or UMass). After Calipari left UMass for the NBA in 1996, Flint was named his successor, becoming the school's 17th head coach. While coach of the Minutemen, Flint compiled an overall record of 86–72. He won an NABC District Coach of the Year award in 1998. Facing pressure after being unable to maintain the Minutemen's level of success that they enjoyed under Calipari, Flint resigned from UMass after the 2000–01 season.

== Later coaching career ==
Flint became the head coach at Drexel on April 5, 2001, succeeding Steve Seymour, who had been fired that March after failing to make the NCAA Tournament in either of his two seasons as head coach. Flint's hiring at Drexel coincided with Drexel's move from the America East Conference, where the school had enjoyed a sustained level of success under former head coach Bill Herrion, to the Colonial Athletic Association (or CAA).

During his tenure at Drexel, Flint was named CAA coach of the year four times (2002, 2004, 2009, 2012). He also won an NABC District Coach of the Year award three times (2007, 2009, 2012). Under Flint, Drexel made five NIT appearances. In 2012, the school won its first CAA Regular Season Championship in 2012, but lost to VCU in the finals of the Conference Tournament. On Selection Sunday, Drexel narrowly missed an at-large berth in the NCAA Tournament. The Dragons won two games in the 2012 NIT, but their run was ended by UMass (Flint's previous employer).

Following the end of Drexel's 2015-16 season, Flint was fired as head basketball coach after 15 seasons with the team. At the time of his firing, he was the all–time winningest coach in Drexel basketball history.

Flint went on to serve as assistant coach to Archie Miller at Indiana, and then reunited with John Calipari on the Kentucky staff. When Calipari moved to the Arkansas job in 2024, he retained Flint on his staff.

== Head coaching record ==
Record table
Season	Team	Overall	Conference	Standing	Postseason
UMass Minutemen (Atlantic 10 Conference) (1996–2001)
1996–97	UMass	19–14	11–5	3rd (East)	NCAA Division I First Round
1997–98	UMass	21–11	12–4	T–2nd (East)	NCAA Division I First Round
1998–99	UMass	14–16	9–7	3rd (East)	
1999–00	UMass	17–16	9–7	3rd (East)	NIT First Round
2000–01	UMass	15–15	11–5	4th	
UMass:		86–72 (.544)	52–28 (.650)		
Drexel Dragons (Colonial Athletic Association) (2001–2016)
2001–02	Drexel	14–14	11–7	T–3rd	
2002–03	Drexel	19–12	12–6	T–2nd	NIT Opening Round
2003–04	Drexel	18–11	13–5	2nd	NIT First Round
2004–05	Drexel	17–12	12–6	T–4th	NIT Opening Round
2005–06	Drexel	15–16	8–10	T–7th	
2006–07	Drexel	23–9	13–5	4th	NIT First Round
2007–08	Drexel	12–20	5–13	10th	
2008–09	Drexel	15–14	10–8	6th	
2009–10	Drexel	16–16	11–7	6th	
2010–11	Drexel	21–10	11–7	5th	
2011–12	Drexel	29–7	16–2	1st	NIT Quarterfinals
2012–13	Drexel	13–18	9–9	7th	
2013–14	Drexel	16–14	8–8	4th	
2014–15	Drexel	11–19	9–9	T–6th	
2015–16	Drexel	6–25	3–15	9th	
Drexel:		245–217 (.530)	150–117 (.562)		
Total:		331–289 (.534)			
National champion Postseason invitational champion Conference regular season champion Conference regular season and conference tournament champion Division regular season champion Division regular season and conference tournament champion Conference tournament champion
