= Pat Skerry =

American basketball coach

Current position
- Title: Head coach
- Team: Towson
- Conference: CAA
- Record: 255–226 (.530)

Biographical details
- Born: January 21, 1970 (age 56); Medford, Massachusetts, U.S.

Playing career
- 1988–1992: Tufts

Coaching career (HC unless noted)
- 1992–1995: Tufts (assistant)
- 1995–1996: Stonehill (assistant)
- 1996–1998: Curry
- 1998–2000: Northeastern (assistant)
- 2000–2003: William & Mary (assistant)
- 2003–2005: Charleston (assistant)
- 2005–2008: Rhode Island (assistant)
- 2008–2010: Providence (assistant)
- 2010–2011: Pittsburgh (assistant)
- 2011–present: Towson

Head coaching record
- Overall: 279–252 (.525)
- Tournaments: 0–1 (NIT); 2–1 (CIT); 0–1 (Vegas 16)

Accomplishments and honors

Championships
- 2 CAA regular season (2022, 2025)

Awards
- Skip Prosser Man of the Year Award (2023); 2× CAA Coach of the Year (2013, 2025)

Patrick Joseph Skerry (born January 21, 1970) is an American college basketball coach. He is the head coach of the Towson Tigers men's basketball team.

== Biography ==
=== Playing career ===
Skerry played collegiate basketball at Tufts University where he set the school record for career assists (634) and single-season assists (198).

=== Coaching career ===
After graduation, Skerry joined his alma mater's coaching staff, where he spent three seasons before moving on to Stonehill College for the 1995–96 season. A year later he took his first head coaching job at Curry College at the age of 26. In two seasons at the helm of the Colonels, Skerry compiled a 24–25 record.

In 1998, Skerry jumped to Northeastern University as an assistant coach for two seasons, before moving on to William & Mary (2000–03), College of Charleston (2003–05), University of Rhode Island (2005–08), Providence College (2008–10), and Pittsburgh (2010–11) before accepting the head coaching job at Towson, replacing Pat Kennedy.

Skerry's first season in charge of the Tigers saw the team go 1–31, with the lone win coming on January 28, 2012, against UNC-Wilmington, snapping the team's NCAA record 41-game losing streak. One year later, Towson went 18–13, finishing second in the Colonial Athletic Association completing the biggest single season improvement in NCAA basketball history. Despite the high finish, the Tigers were ineligible for the CAA Tournament and NCAA Tournament due to low APR scores that were earned under the previous coach, Pat Kennedy. Skerry was named CAA Coach of the Year at the end of the season.

The Tigers under Coach Skerry won the CAA Regular Season Championship in 2022 after going 15–3 in conference play and posting a 25–9 overall record. Skerry earned another Regular Season Championship in 2025, after going 16–2 in conference and 19–10 overall, leading to his second CAA Coach of the Year selection.

== Head coaching record ==
=== College ===
Record table
Season	Team	Overall	Conference	Standing	Postseason
Curry Colonels (The Commonwealth Coast Conference) (1996–1998)
1996–97	Curry	11–13	N/A	N/A	
1997–98	Curry	13–12	N/A	N/A	
Curry:		24–25 (.490)	N/A		
Towson Tigers (Colonial Athletic Association) (2011–2023)
2011–12	Towson	1–31	1–17	12th	
2012–13	Towson	18–13	13–5	2nd	
2013–14	Towson	25–11	13–3	2nd	CIT Quarterfinals
2014–15	Towson	12–20	5–13	9th	
2015–16	Towson	20–13	11–7	T–3rd	Vegas 16 Quarterfinals
2016–17	Towson	20–13	11–7	3rd	
2017–18	Towson	18–14	8–10	5th	
2018–19	Towson	10–22	6–12	T–8th	
2019–20	Towson	19–13	12–6	3rd	
2020–21	Towson	4–14	3–9	9th	
2021–22	Towson	25–9	15–3	1st	NIT First Round
2022–23	Towson	21–12	12–6	T–3rd	
Towson Tigers (Coastal Athletic Association) (2023–present)
2023–24	Towson	20–14	11–7	5th	
2024–25	Towson	22–11	16–2	1st	
2025–26	Towson	19–15	9–9	T–7th	
2026–27	Towson	1–2	0–0		
Towson:		255–226 (.530)	146–116 (.557)		
Total:		279–252 (.525)			
National champion Postseason invitational champion Conference regular season champion Conference regular season and conference tournament champion Division regular season champion Division regular season and conference tournament champion Conference tournament champion

== Awards ==
- 2x CAA Coach of the Year (2012–13, 2024–25)
- Skip Prosser Man of the Year Award (2023)
