= 2013 CAA men's basketball tournament =

- Tournament Logo
- Classification: Division I
- Season: 2012–13
- Teams: 7
- Site: Richmond Coliseum; Richmond, VA
- Champions: James Madison (4th title)
- Television: NBC Sports Network

2012–13 CAA men's basketball standings
	Conf.				Overall
Team	W		L	PCT	W		L	PCT
Northeastern	14	–	4	.778	20	–	13	.606
Towson*	13	–	5	.722	18	–	13	.581
Delaware	13	–	5	.722	19	–	14	.576
James Madison †	11	–	7	.611	21	–	15	.583
George Mason	10	–	8	.556	22	–	16	.579
Georgia State**	10	–	8	.556	15	–	16	.484
Drexel	9	–	9	.500	13	–	18	.419
William & Mary	7	–	11	.389	13	–	17	.433
UNC Wilmington*	5	–	13	.278	10	–	20	.333
Hofstra	4	–	14	.222	7	–	25	.219
Old Dominion**	3	–	15	.167	5	–	25	.167
† 2013 CAA tournament winner Rankings from AP poll *Ineligible for postseason play due to APR penalties **Ineligible for conference tournament due to changing conferences in 2013

The 2013 Colonial Athletic Association men's basketball tournament was held March 9–11 at the Richmond Coliseum in Richmond, VA. The champion, James Madison, received an automatic bid to the 2013 NCAA tournament.

The 2013 tournament featured only seven teams due to UNC-Wilmington and Towson ineligible for postseason play as a result of low APR scores, and Old Dominion and Georgia State being banned from the CAA tournament due to bylaws that deny access to championships that provide automatic NCAA bids to schools that have announced they will depart the league. Old Dominion and Georgia State were still eligible for an at-large bid to other postseason tournaments.

== Seeds ==
2013 CAA Men's Basketball Tournament seeds
Seed	School	Conf.	Over.
1	Northeastern‡†	14–4	19–11
2	Delaware	13–5	18–13
3	James Madison	11–7	17–14
4	George Mason	10–8	17–13
5	Drexel	9–9	13–17
6	William & Mary	7–11	13–16
7	Hofstra	4–14	7–24
‡ – CAA regular season champions. † – Received a bye in the conference tournament. Overall records are as of the end of the regular season.

== Schedule ==
Session	Game	Time*	Matchup^{#}	Television
First Round – Saturday, March 9
1	1	3:30 PM	#4 George Mason 60, #5 Drexel 54	Comcast SportsNet
1	2	6:00 PM	#2 Delaware 62, #7 Hofstra 57	Comcast SportsNet
1	3	8:30 PM	#3 James Madison 71, #6 William & Mary 68	Comcast SportsNet
Semifinals – Sunday, March 10
2	4	2:00 PM	#1 Northeastern 69, #4 George Mason 67	NBC Sports Network
2	5	4:30 PM	#2 Delaware 57, #3 James Madison 58	NBC Sports Network
Championship Game – Monday, March 11
3	6	7:00 PM	#1 Northeastern 57, #3 James Madison 70	NBC Sports Network
*Game Times in ET. #-Rankings denote tournament seed

== Bracket ==
Quarterfinals, Saturday, March 9 Comcast SportsNet
4	George Mason	60
5	Drexel	54
2	Delaware	62
7	Hofstra	57
3	James Madison	72
6	William & Mary	67

Semifinals, Sunday, March 10; NBCSN
1	Northeastern	69
4	George Mason	67
2	Delaware	57
3	James Madison	58

Championship, Monday, March 11; NBCSN
1	Northeastern	57
3	James Madison	70

All times listed are Eastern

== Game summaries ==
Comcast SportsNet

March 9
3:30 pm

Recap

#4 George Mason 60, #5 Drexel 54
Scoring by half: 27-23, 33-31
Pts: S. Wright - 23; Rebs: J. Arledge - 8 Asts: 3 with 1 B. Allen - 6 Steals	Pts: F. Massenat - 20; Rebs: D. McCoy - 12; Asts: F. Massenat - 4 F. Massenat - 3 Blocks

Richmond Coliseum
Richmond, VA
Referees: W. Humes, L. Andrakakos, B. Testa

Comcast SportsNet

March 9
6:00 pm

Recap

#2 Delaware 62, #7 Hofstra 57
Scoring by half: 24-27, 38-30
Pts: D. Saddler - 22; Rebs: J. Hagins - 15; Asts: J. Threatt - 4 J. Hagins - 2 Blocks	Pts: 2 with 13; Rebs: 2 with 8 Asts: S. Mejia - 6 T. Bule - 3 Steals

Richmond Coliseum
Richmond, VA
Referees: T. Comer, A. Marotta, R. Tyburski

Comcast SportsNet

March 9
8:30 pm

Recap

#3 James Madison 72, #6 William & Mary 67
Scoring by half: 334-33, 238-34
Pts: 2 with 20; Rebs: R. Goins - 6 Asts: D. Moore - 8 A. Davis - 4 Steals	Pts: M. Thornton - 25; Rebs: M. Rum - 6 Asts: 4 with 2 M. Rum - 2 Steals

Richmond Coliseum
Richmond, VA
Attendance: 4655
Referees: S. Casady, B. Covington, T. Ebersole

NBC Sports Network

March 10
2:00 pm

#1 Northeastern 69, #4 George Mason 67
Scoring by half: 19-31, 50-36
Pts: 2 with 14; Rebs: Q. Ford - 6 Asts: J. Smith - 4 R. Spencer - 2 Blocks	Pts: B. Allen - 20; Rebs: M. Gujanicic - 6 Asts: 2 with 4 C. Edwards - 2 Steals

Richmond Coliseum
Richmond, VA

NBC Sports Network

March 10
4:30 pm

#2 Delaware 57, #3 James Madison 58
Scoring by half: 25-29, 32-29
Pts: J. Hagins - 12; Rebs: J. Hagins - 12; Asts: J. Hagins - 4 J. Hagins - 4 Blocks	Pts: A. Davis - 16; Rebs: D. Moore - 7 Asts: D. Moore - 6 A. Nation - 5 Blocks

Richmond Coliseum
Richmond, VA

NBC Sports Network

March 11
7:00 pm

#1 Northeastern 57, #3 James Madison 70
Pts: A. Davis 26

Richmond Coliseum
Richmond, VA
