= Jim Corrigan (basketball) =

American basketball coach

Biographical details
- Born: June 2, 1958 (age 68)
- Education: Duke

Coaching career (HC unless noted)
- 1980–1982: Northern HS (assistant)
- 1982–1987: Bishop McGuinness HS
- 1987–1994: William & Mary (assistant)
- 1994–2013: Old Dominion (associate HC)
- 2012–2013: Old Dominion (interim HC)
- 2013–2017: Old Dominion (assistant)
- 2017–2020: Duke (assistant)

Head coaching record
- Overall: 3–5 (.375)

James H. Corrigan (born June 2, 1958) is an American former basketball coach. He last was an assistant coach for the Duke Blue Devils women's basketball team. Corrigan was the interim coach for the Old Dominion Monarchs men's basketball team during the 2012–13 season.

== College career ==
Corrigan attended Duke University after attending Bishop McGuinness High School in Kernersville, North Carolina, playing basketball at both institutions. He graduated from Duke in 1980 with a degree in management science.

== Coaching career ==
After graduating from Duke, Corrigan first became an assistant coach for the basketball team at Northern High School in Durham, North Carolina before becoming the head coach at his alma mater, Bishop McGuinness High School. Corrigan's first college coaching job was when, in 1987, he became an assistant coach for the William & Mary Tribe men's basketball team. In 1994, Corrigan left William and Mary to become an associate head coach at Old Dominion. Corrigan served in that capacity until midway into the 2012–13 season when Old Dominion fired their head coach Blaine Taylor. Corrigan served as interim head coach for the remaining 8 games, going 3–5 in those games. After being interim head coach, Corrigan joined the Old Dominion Monarchs women's basketball team in 2013. In 2017, Corrigan rejoined his alma mater, Duke, as an assistant coach for their women's basketball team, which he would serve on until 2020.

== Head coaching record ==
Record table
Season	Team	Overall	Conference	Standing	Postseason
Old Dominion Monarchs (Sun Belt) (2013)
2012–13	Old Dominion	3–5	3–5	11th	
Old Dominion:		3–5 (.375)	3–5 (.375)		
Total:		3–5 (.375)			
National champion Postseason invitational champion Conference regular season champion Conference regular season and conference tournament champion Division regular season champion Division regular season and conference tournament champion Conference tournament champion
