= 2012–13 Towson Tigers men's basketball team =

American college basketball season

2012–13 Towson Tigers men's basketball
- Conference: Colonial Athletic Association
- Record: 18–13 (13–5 CAA)
- Head coach: Pat Skerry (2nd season)
- Assistant coaches: Kevin Clark; Luke Murray; Bruce Shingler
- Home arena: Towson Center

2012–13 CAA men's basketball standings
	Conf.				Overall
Team	W		L	PCT	W		L	PCT
Northeastern	14	–	4	.778	20	–	13	.606
Towson*	13	–	5	.722	18	–	13	.581
Delaware	13	–	5	.722	19	–	14	.576
James Madison †	11	–	7	.611	21	–	15	.583
George Mason	10	–	8	.556	22	–	16	.579
Georgia State**	10	–	8	.556	15	–	16	.484
Drexel	9	–	9	.500	13	–	18	.419
William & Mary	7	–	11	.389	13	–	17	.433
UNC Wilmington*	5	–	13	.278	10	–	20	.333
Hofstra	4	–	14	.222	7	–	25	.219
Old Dominion**	3	–	15	.167	5	–	25	.167
† 2013 CAA tournament winner Rankings from AP poll *Ineligible for postseason play due to APR penalties **Ineligible for conference tournament due to changing conferences in 2013

The 2012–13 Towson Tigers men's basketball team represented Towson University during the 2012–13 NCAA Division I men's basketball season. The Tigers, led by second year head coach Pat Skerry, played their home games at the Towson Center and were members of the Colonial Athletic Association. Due to low APR scores, the Tigers were ineligible for post season play, including the CAA Tournament. They finished the season 18–13, 13–5 in CAA play to finish in a tie for second place. This was the Tigers' last season playing home games at the Towson Center as they moved to their new home, Tiger Arena, in 2013–14.

== NCAA single season turnaround record ==
The 2012–13 team's record of 18–13 was a 17.5-game win improvement from the year before, which set the new NCAA Division I record for a single-season turnaround (in 2011–12 they had finished 1–31). The 2002–03 Mercer Bears and 2003–04 UTEP Miners basketball teams had each formerly held the record of 17-game improvements.

== Roster ==
Number	Name	Position	Height	Weight	Year	Hometown
0	Jerome Hairston	Guard	6–3	190	Freshman	Cheyenne, Wyoming
1	Marcus Damas	Forward	6–7	210	Junior	Bay Shore, New York
2	Marquis Marshall	Guard	6–5	170	Freshman	Reading, Pennsylvania
3	Kris Walden	Guard	6–1	175	Sophomore	Richmond, Virginia
4	Four McGlynn	Guard	6–2	180	Sophomore	York, Pennsylvania
5	D. Cimini	Guard	5-9	170	Freshman	Charlotte, North Carolina
10	Bryan Blackstone	Guard	5–10	185	Senior	Ivyland, Pennsylvania
11	Christian Collins	Guard	6–0	170	Junior	Baltimore, Maryland
12	Barrington Alston	Forward	6–8	220	Freshman	Wilmington, Delaware
15	Timajh Parker-Rivera	Forward	6–7	215	Freshman	Milford, Connecticut
20	Jerrelle Benimon	Forward	6–8	245	Junior	Warrenton, Virginia
22	Rafriel Guthrie	Forward/Guard	6–3	210	Junior	Washington, D.C.
23	Mike Burwell	Guard	6–5	205	Junior	East Brunswick, New Jersey
24	Bilal Dixon	Forward/Center	6–9	245	Senior	Jersey City, New Jersey
32	Jeremy Schulkin	Guard	6–4	200	Freshman	Chesterfield, New Jersey
44	Jamel Flash	Forward	6–10	220	Sophomore	West Hempstead, New York

== Schedule ==
Date time, TV	Rank^{#}	Opponent^{#}	Result	Record	Site (attendance) city, state
Exhibition
11/01/2012*; 7:00 pm		Bloomsburg	W 87–65		Towson Center; Towson, Maryland
11/12/2012*; 7:00 pm		Goldey-Beacom	W 72–64		Towson Center; Towson, Maryland
Regular Season
11/09/2012*; 7:30 pm		at College of Charleston	L 58–75	0–1	TD Arena (4,215); Charleston, South Carolina
11/16/2012*; 8:00 pm		vs. Radford; Comfort Suites Invitational	W 75–67	1–1	Alumni Coliseum (250); Richmond, Kentucky
11/17/2012*; 6:00 pm		at Eastern Kentucky; Comfort Suites Invitational	L 69–71 ^{OT}	1–2	Alumni Coliseum (1,400); Richmond, Kentucky
11/18/2012*; 7:00 pm		vs. Kennesaw State; Comfort Suites Invitational	W 69–63	2–2	Alumni Coliseum (150); Richmond, Kentucky
11/19/2012*; 1:00 pm		vs. Cincinnati Christian; Comfort Suites Invitational	W 79–40	3–2	Alumni Coliseum (100); Richmond, Kentucky
11/26/2012*; 7:30 pm		at Loyola (MD)	L 53–65	3–3	Reitz Arena (1,376); Baltimore
12/01/2012*; 7:00 pm		at UMBC	L 62–66	3–4	Retriever Activities Center (1,627); Catonsville, Maryland
12/05/2012*; 7:00 pm		at Vermont	W 68–64	4–4	Patrick Gym (2,073); Burlington, Vermont
12/08/2012*; 12:00 pm, MASN		at No. 15 Georgetown	L 40–46	4–5	Verizon Center (8,322); Washington, D.C.
12/12/2012*; 7:00 pm		at Temple	L 61–72	4–6	Liacouras Center (4,625); Philadelphia
12/15/2012*; 7:00 pm		North Dakota State	L 48–65	4–7	Towson Center (1,634); Towson, Maryland
12/19/2012*; 7:30 pm		Coppin State	L 61–64	4–8	Towson Center (1,018); Towson, Maryland
12/29/2012*; 4:00 pm, P12N		at Oregon State	W 67–66 ^{OT}	5–8	Gill Coliseum (3,847); Corvallis, Oregon
01/02/2013; 7:00 pm		at UNC Wilmington	W 79–74	6–8 (1–0)	Trask Coliseum (3,331); Wilmington, North Carolina
01/05/2013; 4:00 pm		at Drexel	W 69–66	7–8 (2–0)	Daskalakis Athletic Center (2,071); Philadelphia
01/09/2013; 7:00 pm		William & Mary	W 99–86 ^{2OT}	8–8 (3–0)	Towson Center (1,008); Towson, Maryland
01/12/2013; 12:00 pm		Northeastern	L 59–70	8–9 (3–1)	Towson Center (1,814); Towson, Maryland
01/16/2013; 7:00 pm		at Delaware	W 69–66	9–9 (4–1)	Bob Carpenter Center (2,242); Newark, Delaware
01/19/2013; 12:00 pm		James Madison	W 73–47	10–9 (5–1)	Towson Center (1,677); Towson, Maryland
01/21/2013; 7:00 pm		Georgia State	L 69–71	10–10 (5–2)	Towson Center (1,441); Towson, Maryland
01/23/2013; 7:00 pm		George Mason	L 67–77	10–11 (5–3)	Towson Center (2,005); Towson, Maryland
01/26/2013; 7:00 pm		at William & Mary	L 56–63	10–12 (5–4)	Kaplan Arena (3,091); Williamsburg, Virginia
01/30/2013; 7:00 pm		at Old Dominion	W 68–66	11–12 (6–4)	Ted Constant Convocation Center (5,971); Norfolk, Virginia
02/04/2013; 7:00 pm		UNC Wilmington	W 81–68	12–12 (7–4)	Towson Center (1,368); Towson, Maryland
02/06/2013; 7:00 pm		Delaware	W 85–65	13–12 (8–4)	Towson Center (2,409); Towson, Maryland
02/09/2013; 2:00 pm		at Georgia State	W 90–82 ^{OT}	14–12 (9–4)	GSU Sports Arena (1,772); Atlanta
02/12/2013; 7:00 pm, CSNMA		at James Madison	L 70–75	14–13 (9–5)	JMU Convocation Center (2,957); Harrisonburg, Virginia
02/16/2013; 4:00 pm		at Hofstra	W 57–50	15–13 (10–5)	Mack Sports Complex (2,756); Hempstead, New York
02/23/2013; 12:00 pm		Drexel	W 72–71	16–13 (11–5)	Towson Center (1,822); Towson, Maryland
02/26/2013; 7:00 pm, CSNMA+		George Mason	W 85–81 ^{OT}	17–13 (12–5)	Patriot Center (3,956); Fairfax, Virginia
03/02/2013; 4:00 pm		Hofstra	W 67–64	18–13 (13–5)	Towson Center (4,119); Towson, Maryland
*Non-conference game. ^{#}Rankings from AP Poll. (#) Tournament seedings in parentheses. All times are in Eastern Time.
