= Jamion Christian =

American basketball coach (born 1982)

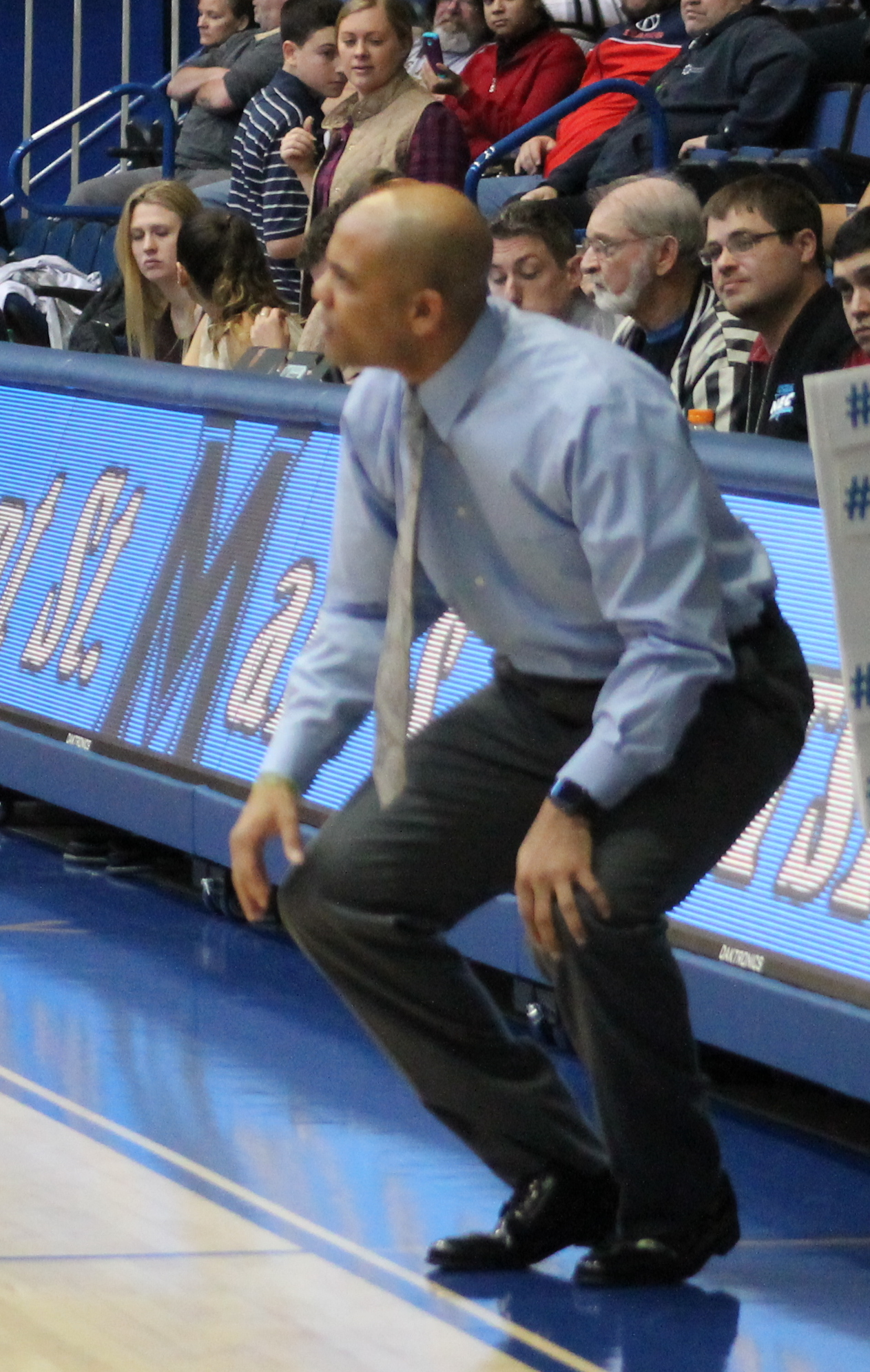
- Christian in 2016

Current position
- Title: Head coach
- Team: Bryant
- Conference: America East
- Record: 12–26 (.316)

Biographical details
- Born: April 18, 1982 (age 44); Quinton, Virginia, U.S.

Playing career
- 2000–2003: Mount St. Mary's
- Position: Guard

Coaching career (HC unless noted)
- 2004–2006: Emory and Henry (assistant)
- 2006–2008: Bucknell (operations)
- 2008–2011: William & Mary (assistant)
- 2011–2012: VCU (assistant)
- 2012–2018: Mount St. Mary's
- 2018–2019: Siena
- 2019–2022: George Washington
- 2023–2025: Pallacanestro Trieste
- 2025–present: Bryant

Head coaching record
- Overall: 159–187 (.460)
- Tournaments: 1–2 (NCAA Division I)

Accomplishments and honors

Championships
- LNP Serie A2 Champion (2024); 2× NEC tournament (2014, 2017); NEC regular season (2017)

Awards
- NEC Coach of the Year (2017); Ben Jobe Award (2017)

Jamion Christian (born April 18, 1982) is an American basketball coach. He is currently the head coach of the Bryant Bulldogs men's basketball team. He previously was the head coach at Siena, Mount St. Mary's, and George Washington. He was also the head coach for Pallacanestro Trieste in the Italian Lega Basket Serie A (LBA) from 2023 to 2025.

== Biography ==
Christian was born and raised in Quinton, Virginia. As a shooting guard, he led New Kent High School to a Virginia High School League State Championship with a 26–0 record and earned the VHSL Group A State Player of the Year honors. Christian then became a shooting guard and a three-year captain for Mount St. Mary's under head coaches Jim Phelan and Milan Brown. Christian has a strong pedigree in athletics, Christian's father, John, was a standout track athlete at Virginia State University. The elder Christian is in the Virginia State University Hall of Fame and is a retired Head Coach of the Charles City County High School Track & Field team. His mother was middle school teacher for New Kent County.

His brother, Jarell Christian, is currently a coach for the Seattle Storm.

=== Assistant coaching career ===
Christian began his coaching career as an assistant at Emory and Henry College (2004–06), Bucknell (2006–08) and then William & Mary (2008–11). While with Coach Shaver and the Tribe, Christian recruited two of the most successful players in Tribe history: Brandon Britt and Marcus Thornton.

Christian then served as an assistant at Virginia Commonwealth (2011–12) under head coach Shaka Smart, helping the Rams to the third round of the 2012 NCAA tournament after upsetting #5 seed Wichita State in the 2nd round. Coach Christian also helped the Rams to a 2012 CAA Tournament championship and finished 2011–12 season with the most wins in school history (29).

=== Head coaching career ===
Mount St. Mary's hired Christian as head coach on March 26, 2012. Christian implemented an up-tempo offense and “mayhem” defense, comparable to VCU's "havoc" defense popularized by Shaka Smart. After his first season at the helm, Christian was named finalist for the 2013 Joe B. Hall Award, presented to the top first-year head coach in Division 1.

During the 2012–13 season, the Mountaineers qualified for the NEC tournament. As a No. 5 seed, Mount St. Mary's upset Bryant and Robert Morris, but lost to Long Island University in the championship game. During the 2013–14 season, the Mountaineers won the NEC tournament and earned an automatic bid to the NCAA tournament, their first appearance since 2008.

Christian was also responsible for overseeing development of Rashad Whack (2014 NEC Tournament MVP and 2nd Team All-NEC; 2013 NEC All-Tournament Team), Julian Norfleet (2014 NEC All-Tournament Team and 2nd Team All-NEC), Sam Prescott (2014 NEC All-Tournament Team) and Shivaughn Wiggins (2013 NEC Rookie of the Year and CollegeInsider.com Mid-Major Freshman of the Year).

On May 2, 2018, Christian replaced Jimmy Patsos as the head coach at Siena. He guided the Saints to a nine-win turnaround from the previous year, finishing 17–16 overall and 11–7 in MAAC play, and a second-place finish. It would be his only season on the job as he accepted the head coaching position at George Washington on March 21, 2019. Christian was fired from George Washington on March 14, 2022, after three seasons.

In July 2023, Christian accepted a job offer from Italy and became head coach of Pallacanestro Trieste. He guided Trieste to a Serie A2 Championship in 2024 and thus to promotion to the country's top flight, Lega Basket Serie A.

On April 3, 2025, Christian was named the next head coach at Bryant, replacing Phil Martelli Jr.

== Head coaching record ==
=== College ===
Record table
Season	Team	Overall	Conference	Standing	Postseason
Mount St. Mary's Mountaineers (Northeast Conference) (2012–2018)
2012–13	Mount St. Mary's	18–14	11–7	T–5th	
2013–14	Mount St. Mary's	16–17	9–7	4th	NCAA Division I First Four
2014–15	Mount St. Mary's	15–15	11–7	4th	
2015–16	Mount St. Mary's	14–19	10–8	5th	
2016–17	Mount St. Mary's	20–16	14–4	1st	NCAA Division I Round of 64
2017–18	Mount St. Mary's	18–14	12–6	T–2nd	
Mount St. Mary's:		101–95 (.515)	67–39 (.632)		
Siena Saints (Metro Atlantic Athletic Conference) (2018–2019)
2018–19	Siena	17–16	11–7	T–2nd	
Siena:		17–16 (.515)	11–7 (.611)		
George Washington Colonials (Atlantic 10 Conference) (2019–2022)
2019–20	George Washington	12–20	6–12	T–10th	
2020–21	George Washington	5–12	3–5	11th	
2021–22	George Washington	12–18	8–9	7th	
George Washington:		29–50 (.367)	17–26 (.395)		
Bryant Bulldogs (America East Conference) (2025–present)
2025–26	Bryant	9–22	5–11	T–7th	
2026–27	Bryant	3–4	0–0		
Bryant:		12–26 (.316)	5–11 (.313)		
Total:		159–187 (.460)			
National champion Postseason invitational champion Conference regular season champion Conference regular season and conference tournament champion Division regular season champion Division regular season and conference tournament champion Conference tournament champion

=== Lega Basket ===
Team	Year	G	W	L	W–L%	Result
Pallacanestro Trieste	2023–24	42	27	15	.643	Won Serie A2 championship
Pallacanestro Trieste	2024–25	23	14	9	.609	Missed playoffs
Career		65	41	24	.631	
