= 2012–13 Central Connecticut Blue Devils men's basketball team =

American college basketball season

2012–13 Central Connecticut Blue Devils men's basketball
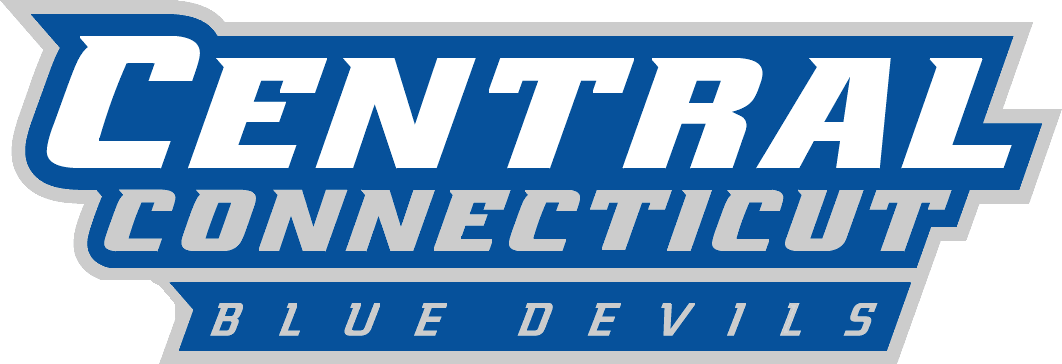
- Conference: Northeast Conference
- Record: 13–17 (9–9 NEC)
- Head coach: Howie Dickenman (17th season)
- Assistant coaches: Sean Ryan; Steve Treffiletti; Jamaal Wagner; Sean McCurdy
- Home arena: William H. Detrick Gymnasium

2012–13 Northeast Conference men's basketball standings
	Conf.				Overall
Team	W		L	PCT	W		L	PCT
Robert Morris	14	–	4	.778	24	–	11	.686
Bryant	12	–	6	.667	19	–	12	.613
Wagner	12	–	6	.667	19	–	12	.613
Long Island †	12	–	6	.667	20	–	14	.588
Mount St. Mary's	11	–	7	.611	18	–	14	.563
Quinnipiac	11	–	7	.611	15	–	16	.484
Central Connecticut	9	–	9	.500	13	–	17	.433
St. Francis Brooklyn	8	–	10	.444	12	–	18	.400
Sacred Heart	7	–	11	.389	9	–	20	.310
Monmouth	5	–	13	.278	10	–	21	.323
Saint Francis (PA)	5	–	13	.278	5	–	24	.172
Fairleigh Dickinson	2	–	16	.111	7	–	24	.226
† 2013 NEC tournament winner As of March 25, 2013; Rankings from AP Poll

The 2012–13 Central Connecticut Blue Devils men's basketball team represented Central Connecticut State University during the 2012–13 NCAA Division I men's basketball season. The Blue Devils, led by 17th year head coach Howie Dickenman, played their home games at the William H. Detrick Gymnasium and were members of the Northeast Conference. They finished the season 13–17, 9–9 in NEC play to finish in seventh place. They lost in the quarterfinals of the Northeast Conference Basketball tournament to Wagner.

== Roster ==
Number	Name	Position	Height	Weight	Year	Hometown
0	Adonis Burbage	Forward	6–5	185	Sophomore	Orlando, Florida
1	Kyle Vinales	Guard	6–1	180	Sophomore	Detroit, Michigan
3	Andrew Hurd	Guard	5–10	160	Freshman	Windsor, Connecticut
5	De'Angelo Speech	Guard	6–5	185	Junior	Oak Park, Illinois
10	Shelton Mickell	Guard	6–2	175	Sophomore	Queens, New York
11	Malcolm McMillan	Guard	6–0	180	Sophomore	Baltimore, Maryland
12	Khalen Kumberlander	Guard	6–3	185	Freshman	Washington, D.C.
15	Erik Raleigh	Forward	6–8	190	Freshman	Philadelphia, Pennsylvania
21	Joe Efese	Forward	6–6	235	Senior	Spring Valley, New York
25	Matt Hunter	Guard	6–5	190	Junior	Detroit, Michigan
30	Greg Andrade	Guard	6–0	180	Sophomore	Windsor, Connecticut
33	Terrell Allen	Forward	6–6	225	Junior	Virginia Beach, Virginia
34	Brandon Peel	Forward	6–7	200	Freshman	Forestville, Maryland

== Schedule ==
Date time, TV	Opponent	Result	Record	Site (attendance) city, state
Regular season
11/10/2012*; 8:00 pm	vs. Fairfield; Connecticut 6 Classic	L 63–64 ^{OT}	0–1	Chase Arena at Reich Family Pavilion (3,186); Hartford, CT
11/12/2012*; 7:00 pm	at Saint Peter's	L 61–64	0–2	Yanitelli Center (1,219); Jersey City, NJ
11/15/2012*; 7:30 pm	Brown	W 86–71	1–2	William H. Detrick Gymnasium (2,214); New Britain, CT
11/18/2012*; 2:00 pm	at La Salle	W 81–74	2–2	Tom Gola Arena (1,512); Philadelphia, PA
11/20/2012*; 7:30 pm	at UMBC	W 83–82 ^{OT}	3–2	Retriever Activities Center (1,988); Catonsville, MD
11/24/2012*; 4:00 pm	at Hartford	L 77–80	3–3	Chase Arena at Reich Family Pavilion (1,302); West Hartford, CT
12/05/2012*; 7:30 pm	at New Hampshire	W 87–84	4–3	Lundholm Gym (613); Durham, NH
12/08/2012*; 6:00 pm, BTN	at No. 1 Indiana	L 69–100	4–4	Assembly Hall (17,472); Bloomington, IN
12/21/2012*; 8:00 pm	Northeastern	L 63–82	4–5	William H. Detrick Gymnasium (1,526); New Britain, CT
12/29/2012*; 1:00 pm	Saint Peter's	L 69–71	4–6	William H. Detrick Gymnasium (1,216); New Britain, CT
12/31/2012*; 3:00 pm, ESPNU	at No. 7 Syracuse	L 62–96	4–7	Carrier Dome (17,550); Syracuse, NY
01/03/2013; 7:00 pm	at Saint Francis (PA)	L 60–67	4–8 (0–1)	DeGol Arena (581); Loretto, PA
01/05/2013; 7:00 pm	at Robert Morris	W 77–70	5–8 (1–1)	Charles L. Sewall Center (577); Moon Township, PA
01/10/2013; 7:00 pm	Sacred Heart	W 84–78	6–8 (2–1)	William H. Detrick Gymnasium (2,110); New Britain, CT
01/12/2013; 3:30 pm	Bryant	L 62–69	6–9 (2–2)	William H. Detrick Gymnasium (1,846); New Britain, CT
01/17/2013; 7:00 pm	Wagner	W 73–66	7–9 (3–2)	William H. Detrick Gymnasium (2,217); New Britain, CT
01/19/2013; 3:30 pm	Mount St. Mary's	L 75–80	7–10 (3–3)	William H. Detrick Gymnasium (1,849); New Britain, CT
01/24/2013; 7:30 pm	at Quinnipiac	L 78–85	7–11 (3–4)	TD Bank Sports Center (2,076); Hamden, CT
01/26/2013; 3:30 pm	St. Francis Brooklyn	W 72–70	8–11 (4–4)	William H. Detrick Gymnasium (1,984); New Britain, CT
01/31/2013; 7:00 pm	at Monmouth	W 78–58	9–11 (5–4)	Multipurpose Activity Center (1,205); West Long Branch, NJ
02/02/2013; 7:00 pm	at Fairleigh Dickinson	W 80–71	10–11 (6–4)	Rothman Center (572); Hackensack, NJ
02/07/2013; 7:00 pm	Long Island	L 75–81	10–12 (6–5)	William H. Detrick Gymnasium (2,025); New Britain, CT
02/11/2013; 7:00 pm	Quinnipiac			William H. Detrick Gymnasium; New Britain, CT
02/14/2013; 7:00 pm	at Wagner	L 82–101	10–13 (6–6)	Spiro Sports Center (1,132); Staten Island, NY
02/16/2013; 11:30 am	at Mount St. Mary's	L 80–89	10–14 (6–7)	Knott Arena (1,165); Emmitsburg, MD
02/21/2013; 7:00 pm	at Bryant	L 67–88	10–15 (6–8)	Chace Athletic Center (1,386); Smithfield, RI
02/23/2013; 3:30 pm	at Sacred Heart	W 80–72	11–15 (7–8)	William H. Pitt Center (1,700); Fairfield, CT
02/25/2013; 7:00 pm	Quinnipiac	W 67–65	12–15 (8–8)	William H. Detrick Gymnasium (2,014); New Britain, CT
02/28/2013; 7:00 pm	Saint Francis (PA)	W 84–81 ^{2OT}	13–15 (9–8)	William H. Detrick Gymnasium (1,495); New Britain, CT
03/02/2013; 11:30 am	Robert Morris	L 61–81	13–16 (9–9)	William H. Detrick Gymnasium (2,364); New Britain, CT
2013 Northeast Conference men's basketball tournament
March 6; 7:00 pm	at Wagner; Quarterfinals	L 50–72	13–17	Spiro Sports Center (1,035); Staten Island, NY
*Non-conference game. ^{#}Rankings from AP Poll. (#) Tournament seedings in parentheses. All times are in Eastern Time.
