= 2012–13 Mount St. Mary's Mountaineers men's basketball team =

American college basketball season

2012–13 Mount St. Mary's Mountaineers men's basketball
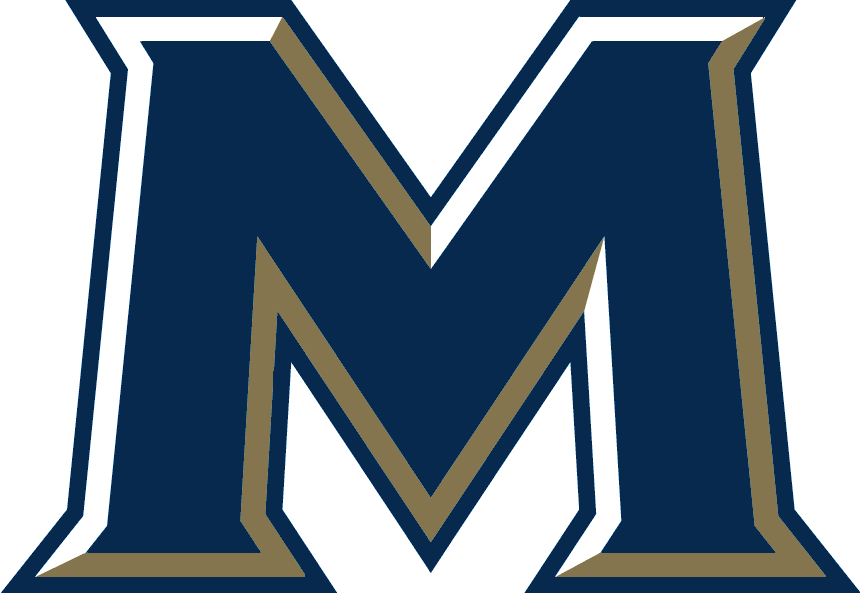
- Conference: Northeast Conference
- Record: 18–14 (11–7 NEC)
- Head coach: Jamion Christian (1st season)
- Assistant coaches: Ben Wilkins; Darryl Bruce; Tony Bethel
- Home arena: Knott Arena

2012–13 Northeast Conference men's basketball standings
| | Conf. | | | | Overall |
| Team | W | | L | PCT | W | | L | PCT |
|---|---|---|---|---|---|---|---|---|
| Robert Morris | 14 | – | 4 | .778 | 24 | – | 11 | .686 |
| Bryant | 12 | – | 6 | .667 | 19 | – | 12 | .613 |
| Wagner | 12 | – | 6 | .667 | 19 | – | 12 | .613 |
| Long Island † | 12 | – | 6 | .667 | 20 | – | 14 | .588 |
| Mount St. Mary's | 11 | – | 7 | .611 | 18 | – | 14 | .563 |
| Quinnipiac | 11 | – | 7 | .611 | 15 | – | 16 | .484 |
| Central Connecticut | 9 | – | 9 | .500 | 13 | – | 17 | .433 |
| St. Francis Brooklyn | 8 | – | 10 | .444 | 12 | – | 18 | .400 |
| Sacred Heart | 7 | – | 11 | .389 | 9 | – | 20 | .310 |
| Monmouth | 5 | – | 13 | .278 | 10 | – | 21 | .323 |
| Saint Francis (PA) | 5 | – | 13 | .278 | 5 | – | 24 | .172 |
| Fairleigh Dickinson | 2 | – | 16 | .111 | 7 | – | 24 | .226 |
† 2013 NEC tournament winner As of March 25, 2013; Rankings from AP Poll

The 2012–13 Mount St. Mary's Mountaineers men's basketball team represented Mount St. Mary's University during the 2012–13 NCAA Division I men's basketball season. The Mountaineers, led by first year head coach Jamion Christian, played their home games at Knott Arena and were members of the Northeast Conference. They finished the season 18–14, 11–7 in NEC play to finish in a tie for fifth place. They advanced to the championship game of the Northeast Conference tournament where they lost to Long Island. Despite the 18 wins, they did not participate in a postseason tournament.

== Roster ==
| Number | Name | Position | Height | Weight | Year | Hometown |
|---|---|---|---|---|---|---|
| 1 | Xavier Owens | Forward | 6–5 | 220 | Sophomore | Tampa, Florida |
| 3 | Sam Prescott | Guard | 6–3 | 185 | Junior | Philadelphia, Pennsylvania |
| 4 | Christian Crockett | Forward | 6–6 | 210 | Freshman | Houston, Texas |
| 5 | Josh Castellanos | Guard | 6–1 | 165 | Junior | Orlando, Florida |
| 10 | Shivaughn Wiggins | Guard | 5–10 | 160 | Freshman | Charlotte, North Carolina |
| 13 | Kristijan Krajina | Forward | 6–9 | 230 | Junior | Osijek, Croatia |
| 14 | Oliver Brown | Guard | 6–4 | 190 | Senior | Dover, Massachusetts |
| 15 | Gregory Graves | Forward | 6–7 | 205 | Freshman | Sterling, Virginia |
| 21 | Kelvin Parker | Forward | 6–3 | 285 | Sophomore | York, Pennsylvania |
| 22 | Rashad Whack | Guard | 6–2 | 179 | Junior | Hyattsville, Maryland |
| 23 | Julian Norfleet | Guard | 6–2 | 165 | Junior | Virginia Beach, Virginia |
| 25 | Melvin Gregory | Forward | 6–7 | 195 | Freshman | Lancaster, Virginia |
| 31 | Aaron DeVan | Guard | 6–3 | 180 | Freshman | Harrisburg, Pennsylvania |
| 34 | Aaron Brown | Forward | 6–6 | 205 | Sophomore | Fort Worth, Texas |
| 35 | Raven Barber | Forward | 6–8 | 220 | Senior | Edgewood, Maryland |
| 50 | Taylor Danaher | Center | 7–0 | 210 | Freshman | Fredericksburg, Virginia |

== Schedule ==
| Date time, TV | Opponent | Result | Record | Site (attendance) city, state |
Regular season
| 11/09/2012*; 6:00 pm, ESPN3 | at Pittsburgh | L 48–80 | 0–1 | Petersen Events Center (8,928); Pittsburgh, PA |
| 11/13/2012*; 7:00 pm | Hartford | W 70–63 | 1–1 | Knott Arena (1,522); Emmitsburg, MD |
| 11/15/2012*; 7:30 pm | at American | L 57–62 | 1–2 | Bender Arena (1,323); Washington, D.C. |
| 11/24/2012*; 12:00 pm, ESPN3 | at Georgetown | L 50–72 | 1–3 | Verizon Center (7,467); Washington, D.C. |
| 11/26/2012*; 7:00 pm | at George Washington | W 65–56 | 2–3 | Charles E. Smith Athletic Center (1,507); Washington, D.C. |
| 12/01/2012*; 2:00 pm | at Binghamton | W 71–70 | 3–3 | Binghamton University Events Center (2,071); Vestal, NY |
| 12/07/2012*; 7:00 pm | Navy | W 72–65 | 4–3 | Knott Arena (1,851); Emmitsburg, MD |
| 12/15/2012*; 7:00 pm, MASN | at Loyola (MD) | L 57–79 | 4–4 | Reitz Arena (1,636); Baltimore, MD |
| 12/19/2012*; 7:00 pm, BTN | at No. 6 Indiana | L 54–93 | 4–5 | Assembly Hall (17,009); Bloomington, IN |
| 12/22/2012*; 2:00 pm | at Western Michigan | L 66–87 | 4–6 | University Arena (3,114); Kalamazoo, MI |
| 12/29/2012*; 2:00 pm | UMBC | W 58–55 | 5–6 | Knott Arena (1,011); Emmitsburg, MD |
| 01/03/2013; 7:00 pm | Fairleigh Dickinson | L 65–72 | 5–7 (0–1) | Knott Arena (865); Emmitsburg, MD |
| 01/05/2013; 7:00 pm | Monmouth | W 71–59 | 6–7 (1–1) | Knott Arena (1,142); Emmitsburg, MD |
| 01/10/2013; 7:00 pm | at St. Francis Brooklyn | L 56–70 | 6–8 (1–2) | Generoso Pope Athletic Complex (375); Brooklyn, NY |
| 01/12/2013; 2:30 pm | at Long Island | L 72–86 | 6–9 (1–3) | Athletic, Recreation & Wellness Center (2,413); Brooklyn, NY |
| 01/17/2013; 7:00 pm | at Bryant | L 78–79 ^{OT} | 6–10 (1–4) | Chace Athletic Center (909); Smithfield, RI |
| 01/19/2013; 3:30 pm | at Central Connecticut | W 80–75 | 7–10 (2–4) | William H. Detrick Gymnasium (1,849); New Britain, CT |
| 01/24/2013; 7:00 pm | Wagner | L 50–52 | 7–11 (2–5) | Knott Arena (966); Emmitsburg, MD |
| 01/26/2013; 7:00 pm | at Robert Morris | L 68–76 | 7–12 (2–6) | Charles L. Sewall Center (1,121); Moon Township, PA |
| 01/31/2013; 7:00 pm | Quinnipiac | W 77–73 | 8–12 (3–6) | Knott Arena (812); Emmitsburg, MD |
| 02/02/2013; 4:00 pm | Sacred Heart | W 91–82 | 9–12 (4–6) | Knott Arena (2,006); Emmitsburg, MD |
| 02/06/2013; 7:00 pm | at Wagner | L 65–74 | 9–13 (4–7) | Spiro Sports Center (2,107); Staten Island, NY |
| 02/09/2013; 7:00 pm | at Saint Francis (PA) | W 69–58 | 10–13 (5–7) | DeGol Arena (1,236); Loretto, PA |
| 02/14/2013; 7:00 pm | Bryant | W 84–70 | 11–13 (6–7) | Knott Arena (778); Emmitsburg, MD |
| 02/16/2013; 11:30 am | Central Connecticut | W 89–80 | 12–13 (7–7) | Knott Arena (1,165); Emmitsburg, MD |
| 02/21/2013; 7:00 pm | Long Island | W 83–71 | 13–13 (8–7) | Knott Arena (1,302); Emmitsburg, MD |
| 02/23/2013; 3:30 pm | St. Francis Brooklyn | W 73–65 | 14–13 (9–7) | Knott Arena (1,305); Emmitsburg, MD |
| 02/28/2013; 7:00 pm | at Monmouth | W 77–63 | 15–13 (10–7) | Multipurpose Activity Center (1,570); West Long Branch, NJ |
| 03/02/2013; 4:30 pm | at Fairleigh Dickinson | W 103–82 | 16–13 (11–7) | Rothman Center (1,215); Hackensack, NJ |
2013 Northeast Conference men's basketball tournament
| 03/06/2013; 7:00 pm | at Bryant; Quarterfinals | W 75–69 | 17–13 | Chace Athletic Center (2,680); Smithfield, RI |
| 03/09/2013; 2:30 pm, MSG/FCS | at Robert Morris; Semifinals | W 69–60 | 18–13 | Charles L. Sewall Center (1,303); Moon Township, PA |
| 03/12/2013; 7:00 pm, ESPN2 | at Long Island; Championship Game | L 70–91 | 18–14 | Athletic, Recreation & Wellness Center (1,700); Brooklyn, NY |
*Non-conference game. ^{#}Rankings from AP Poll. (#) Tournament seedings in parentheses. All times are in Eastern Time.
