= 2012–13 Sacred Heart Pioneers men's basketball team =

American college basketball season

2012–13 Sacred Heart Pioneers men's basketball
- Conference: Northeast Conference
- Record: 9–20 (7–11 NEC)
- Head coach: Dave Bike
- Assistant coaches: Anthony Latina; Johnny Kidd; Kevin Papacs
- Home arena: William H. Pitt Center

2012–13 Northeast Conference men's basketball standings
	Conf.				Overall
Team	W		L	PCT	W		L	PCT
Robert Morris	14	–	4	.778	24	–	11	.686
Bryant	12	–	6	.667	19	–	12	.613
Wagner	12	–	6	.667	19	–	12	.613
Long Island †	12	–	6	.667	20	–	14	.588
Mount St. Mary's	11	–	7	.611	18	–	14	.563
Quinnipiac	11	–	7	.611	15	–	16	.484
Central Connecticut	9	–	9	.500	13	–	17	.433
St. Francis Brooklyn	8	–	10	.444	12	–	18	.400
Sacred Heart	7	–	11	.389	9	–	20	.310
Monmouth	5	–	13	.278	10	–	21	.323
Saint Francis (PA)	5	–	13	.278	5	–	24	.172
Fairleigh Dickinson	2	–	16	.111	7	–	24	.226
† 2013 NEC tournament winner As of March 25, 2013; Rankings from AP Poll

The 2012–13 Sacred Heart Pioneers men's basketball team represented Sacred Heart University during the 2012–13 NCAA Division I men's basketball season. This was the Pioneers' 14th season of NCAA Division I basketball, all played in the Northeast Conference. The Pioneers were coached by Dave Bike in his thirty-fifth year as Sacred Heart's head coach. SHU played their home games at the William H. Pitt Center. They finished the season 9–20, 7–11 in NEC play to finish in ninth place. They failed to qualify for the Northeast Conference Basketball tournament.

== Roster ==
Number	Name	Position	Height	Weight	Year	Hometown
2	Evan Kelley	Guard	6–4	180	Junior	Norwalk, Connecticut
3	Cole Walton	Center	6–11	215	Freshman	Bellevue, Washington
4	Phil Gaetano	Guard	5–10	170	Sophomore	Wallingford, Connecticut
5	Justin Swidowski	Forward/center	6–9	215	RS senior	Cinnaminson, New Jersey
11	Chris Evans	Guard/forward	6–3	210	Junior	Norwalk, Connecticut
12	Louis Montes	Guard/forward	6–4	220	RS junior	Brockton, Massachusetts
21	Femi Akinpetide	Forward	6–6	230	RS senior	Sydney, Australia
24	Mostafa Abdel Latif	Forward	6–8	230	RS junior	Alexandria, Egypt
25	Shane Gibson	Guard	6–2	180	Redshirt-Senior	Killingly, Connecticut
30	Nick Greenbacker	Forward/center	6–9	235	RS senior	Coventry, Connecticut
31	Steve Glowiak	Guard	6–3	185	RS sophomore	New Britain, Connecticut
32	De'Aires Tate	Forward	6–9	205	Freshman	Lithonia, Georgia
34	Tevin Falzon	Forward	6–7	215	Freshman	Newton, Massachusetts

Roster:

== Schedule ==
Date time, TV	Opponent	Result	Record	Site (attendance) city, state
Regular season
November 10*; 5:30 pm	vs. Yale; Connecticut 6 Classic	W 85–82 ^{OT}	1–0	Chase Arena at Reich Family Pavilion (N/A); Hartford, CT
November 12*; 7:30 pm	at Rutgers	L 62–88	1–1	Louis Brown Athletic Center (2,768); Piscataway, NJ
November 16*; 7:00 pm	at Hartford	L 47–62	1–2	Chase Arena at Reich Family Pavilion (1,611); Hartford, CT
November 18*; 2:00 pm	at Stony Brook	W 64–62	2–2	Pritchard Gymnasium (1,137); Stony Brook, NY
November 25*; 2:00 pm	Lehigh	L 77–91	2–3	William H. Pitt Center (636); Fairfield, CT
November 29*; 7:00 pm	at Brown	L 56–69	2–4	Pizzitola Sports Center (529); Providence, RI
December 5*; 7:00 pm	Holy Cross	L 78–83	2–5	William H. Pitt Center (664); Fairfield, CT
December 9*; 2:00 pm	at Lafayette	L 70–72	2–6	Kirby Sports Center (1,017); Easton, PA
December 18*; 7:00 pm	Stony Brook	L 59–64	2–7	William H. Pitt Center (319); Fairfield, CT
December 22*; 2:00 pm	at La Salle	L 71–100	2–8	Tom Gola Arena (1,211); Philadelphia, PA
December 30*; 2:00 pm	at George Washington	L 38–77	2–9	Charles E. Smith Athletic Center (1,764); Washington, D.C.
January 3; 7:00 pm	Long Island	W 77–73	3–9 (1–0)	William H. Pitt Center (358); Fairfield, CT
January 5; 3:30 pm	St. Francis Brooklyn	W 66–65	4–9 (2–0)	William H. Pitt Center (589); Fairfield, CT
January 10; 7:00 pm	at Central Connecticut	L 78–84	4–10 (2–1)	William H. Detrick Gymnasium (2,110); New Britain, CT
January 12; 3:00 pm	at Quinnipiac	W 80–74	5–10 (3–1)	TD Bank Sports Center (1,950); Hamden, CT
January 17; 7:00 pm	at Robert Morris	L 62–66	5–11 (3–2)	Charles L. Sewall Center (783); Moon Township, PA
January 19; 2:00 pm, ESPN3	at Saint Francis (PA)	W 75–72	6–11 (4–2)	DeGol Arena (1,310); Loretto, PA
January 24; 7:00 pm	Bryant	W 87–76	7–11 (5–2)	William H. Pitt Center (728); Fairfield, CT
January 26; 7:00 pm	Monmouth	W 82–68	8–11 (6–2)	William H. Pitt Center (1,614); Fairfield, CT
January 31; 7:00 pm	Wagner	L 78–84 ^{OT}	8–12 (6–3)	Spiro Sports Center (2,032); Staten Island, NY
February 2; 4:00 pm	at Mount St. Mary's	L 82–91	8–13 (6–4)	Knott Arena (2,006); Emmitsburg, MD
February 7; 7:00 pm	Fairleigh Dickinson	W 77–70	9–13 (7–4)	William H. Pitt Center (359); Fairfield, CT
February 11; 7:00 pm	at Bryant			Chace Athletic Center; Smithfield, RI
February 14; 7:00 pm	Saint Francis (PA)	L 60–64	9–14 (7–5)	William H. Pitt Center (331); Fairfield, CT
February 16; 3:30 pm	Robert Morris	L 63–68	9–15 (7–6)	William H. Pitt Center (1,349); Fairfield, CT
February 21; 7:00 pm	Quinnipiac	L 74–81	9–16 (7–7)	William H. Pitt Center (803); Fairfield, CT
February 23; 3:30 pm	Central Connecticut	L 72–80	9–17 (7–8)	William H. Pitt Center (1,700); Fairfield, CT
February 25; 7:00 pm	at Bryant	L 68–84	9–18 (7–9)	Chace Athletic Center; Smithfield, RI
February 28; 7:00 pm	at Long Island	L 68–70	9–19 (7–10)	Athletic, Recreation & Wellness Center (1,028); Brooklyn, NY
March 2; 4:30 pm	at St. Francis Brooklyn	L 80–92	9–20 (7–11)	Generoso Pope Athletic Complex (675); Brooklyn, NY
*Non-conference game. ^{#}Rankings from AP Poll. (#) Tournament seedings in parentheses. All times are in Eastern Time.
