= 2012–13 Quinnipiac Bobcats men's basketball team =

American college basketball season

2012–13 Quinnipiac Bobcats men's basketball
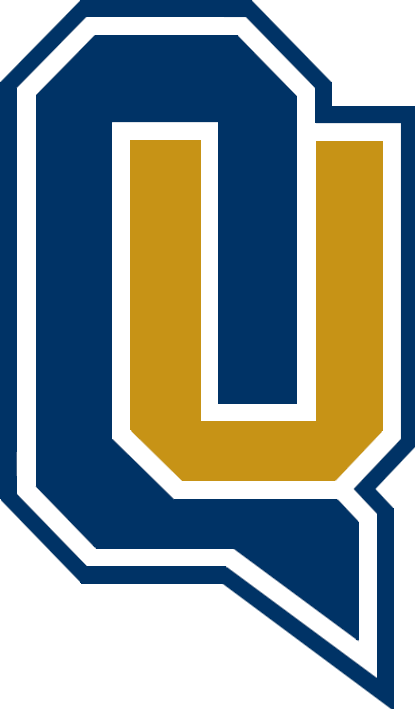
- Conference: Northeast Conference
- Record: 15–16 (11–7 NEC)
- Head coach: Tom Moore (6th season)
- Assistant coaches: Sean Doherty; Eric Eaton; Scott Burrell
- Home arena: TD Bank Sports Center

2012–13 Northeast Conference men's basketball standings
	Conf.				Overall
Team	W		L	PCT	W		L	PCT
Robert Morris	14	–	4	.778	24	–	11	.686
Bryant	12	–	6	.667	19	–	12	.613
Wagner	12	–	6	.667	19	–	12	.613
Long Island †	12	–	6	.667	20	–	14	.588
Mount St. Mary's	11	–	7	.611	18	–	14	.563
Quinnipiac	11	–	7	.611	15	–	16	.484
Central Connecticut	9	–	9	.500	13	–	17	.433
St. Francis Brooklyn	8	–	10	.444	12	–	18	.400
Sacred Heart	7	–	11	.389	9	–	20	.310
Monmouth	5	–	13	.278	10	–	21	.323
Saint Francis (PA)	5	–	13	.278	5	–	24	.172
Fairleigh Dickinson	2	–	16	.111	7	–	24	.226
† 2013 NEC tournament winner As of March 25, 2013; Rankings from AP Poll

The 2012–13 Quinnipiac Bobcats men's basketball team represented Quinnipiac University during the 2012–13 NCAA Division I men's basketball season. The Bobcats, led by sixth year head coach Tom Moore, played their home games at the TD Bank Sports Center and were members of the Northeast Conference. They finished the season 15–16, 11–7 in NEC play to finish in a tie for fifth place. They lost in the quarterfinals of the Northeast Conference Basketball tournament to Long Island.

This was the Bobcats last year as a member of the NEC as they will join the Metro Atlantic Athletic Conference for the 2013–14 season.

== Roster ==
Number	Name	Position	Height	Weight	Year	Hometown
1	Zaid Hearst	Guard	6–4	190	Sophomore	Bethesda, Maryland
2	Dave Johnson	Guard	5–10	150	Senior	Jackson, New Jersey
3	Kendrick Ray	Guard	6–1	180	Freshman	Middletown, New York
4	Ike Azotam	Forward	6–7	231	Junior	Boston, Massachusetts
5	Shaq Shannon	Guard	6–1	176	Junior	Philadelphia, Pennsylvania
10	Garvey Young	Guard	6–5	196	Senior	Washington, D.C.
12	Marquis Barnett	Forward	6–8	243	Junior	The Bronx, New York
14	Tariq Carey	Guard	6–2	171	Freshman	Newark, New Jersey
21	Evan Conti	Guard	6–3	200	Sophomore	Bayside, New York
22	Justin Harris	Forward	6–8	265	Sophomore	Paterson, New Jersey
23	Ousmane Drame	Forward	6–9	240	Sophomore	Boston, Massachusetts
30	James Ford, Jr.	Guard	6–4	192	Freshman	Hopewell, Virginia
35	Jamee Jackson	Forward	6–7	225	Senior	Newark, New Jersey

== Schedule ==
Date time, TV	Opponent	Result	Record	Site (attendance) city, state
Regular season
11/10/2012*; 3:00 pm	at Hartford; Connecticut 6 Classic	W 65–61	1–0	Chase Arena at Reich Family Pavilion (N/A); Hartford, CT
11/12/2012*; 7:00 pm	American	L 55–61	1–1	TD Bank Sports Center (1,822); Hamden, CT
11/16/2012*; 9:00 pm	vs. Iona; Paradise Jam first round	W 98–92 ^{OT}	2–1	Sports and Fitness Center (2,673); Saint Thomas, USVI
11/18/2012*; 9:00 pm, CBSSN	vs. No. 23 Connecticut; Paradise Jam Semifinals	L 83–89 ^{2OT}	2–2	Sports and Fitness Center (2,875); Saint Thomas, USVI
11/19/2012*; 7:30 pm, CBSSN	vs. George Mason; Paradise Jam 3rd place game	L 58–74	2–3	Sports and Fitness Center (3,022); Saint Thomas, USVI
11/27/2012*; 7:00 pm	Lehigh	L 66–77	2–4	TD Bank Sports Center (1,664); Hamden, CT
12/05/2012*; 7:00 pm	Colgate	W 67–56	3–4	TD Bank Sports Center (1,202); Hamden, CT
12/08/2012*; 4:00 pm	Vermont	L 46–53	3–5	TD Bank Sports Center (2,365); Hamden, CT
12/16/2012*; 1:00 pm	at Boston University	L 62–69 ^{OT}	3–6	Case Gym (614); Boston, MA
12/21/2012*; 7:00 pm	at Albany	W 59–57	4–6	SEFCU Arena (2,146); Albany, NY
12/29/2012*; 3:00 pm	Maine	L 71–76	4–7	TD Bank Sports Center (1,802); Hamden, CT
01/03/2013; 7:00 pm	St. Francis Brooklyn	L 61–63	4–8 (0–1)	TD Bank Sports Center (1,258); Hamden, CT
01/05/2013; 3:00 pm	Long Island	W 82–74	5–8 (1–1)	TD Bank Sports Center (1,952); Hamden, CT
01/10/2013; 7:00 pm	Bryant	L 95–103	5–9 (1–2)	Chace Athletic Center (923); Smithfield, RI
01/12/2013; 3:00 pm	Sacred Heart	L 74–80	5–10 (1–3)	TD Bank Sports Center (1,950); Hamden, CT
01/14/2013*; 7:00 pm	at Hampton	L 64–70	5–11	Hampton Convocation Center (2,532); Hampton, VA
01/17/2013; 7:00 pm	at Saint Francis (PA)	W 75–66 ^{OT}	6–11 (2–3)	DeGol Arena (831); Loretto, PA
01/19/2013; 7:00 pm	at Robert Morris	L 75–87	6–12 (2–4)	Charles L. Sewall Center (1,079); Moon Township, PA
01/24/2013; 7:30 pm	Central Connecticut	W 85–78	7–12 (3–4)	TD Bank Sports Center (2,076); Hamden, CT
01/26/2013; 12:00 pm	Fairleigh Dickinson	W 58–56	8–12 (4–4)	TD Bank Sports Center (1,964); Hamden, CT
01/31/2013; 7:00 pm	at Mount St. Mary's	L 73–77	8–13 (4–5)	Knott Arena (812); Emmitsburg, MD
02/02/2013; 4:00 pm	at Wagner	W 74–69	9–13 (5–5)	Spiro Sports Center (1,720); Staten Island, NY
02/07/2013; 7:00 pm	Monmouth	W 79–63	10–13 (6–5)	TD Bank Sports Center (1,469); Hamden, CT
02/11/2013; 7:00 pm	at Central Connecticut			William H. Detrick Gymnasium; New Britain, CT
02/14/2013; 7:30 pm	Robert Morris	W 63–61	11–13 (7–5)	TD Bank Sports Center (1,639); Hamden, CT
02/16/2013; 3:00 pm	Saint Francis (PA)	W 71–55	12–13 (8–5)	TD Bank Sports Center (1,687); Hamden, CT
02/21/2013; 7:00 pm	at Sacred Heart	W 81–74	13–13 (9–5)	William H. Pitt Center (803); Fairfield, CT
02/23/2013; 2:00 pm	Bryant	W 69–58	14–13 (10–5)	TD Bank Sports Center (2,867); Hamden, CT
02/25/2013; 7:00 pm	at Central Connecticut	L 65–67	14–14 (10–6)	William H. Detrick Gymnasium (2,014); New Britain, CT
02/28/2013; 7:00 pm	at St. Francis Brooklyn	W 78–67	15–14 (11–6)	Generoso Pope Athletic Complex (400); Brooklyn Heights, NY
03/02/2013; 4:30 pm	at Long Island	L 90–96	15–15 (11–7)	Athletic, Recreation & Wellness Center (1,275); Brooklyn, NY
2013 Northeast Conference men's basketball tournament
03/06/2013; 7:00 pm	at Long Island; Quarterfinals	L 83–91	15–16	Athletic, Recreation & Wellness Center (1,006); Brooklyn, NY
*Non-conference game. ^{#}Rankings from AP Poll. (#) Tournament seedings in parentheses. All times are in Eastern Time.
