= 2012–13 Wagner Seahawks men's basketball team =

American college basketball season

2012–13 Wagner Seahawks men's basketball
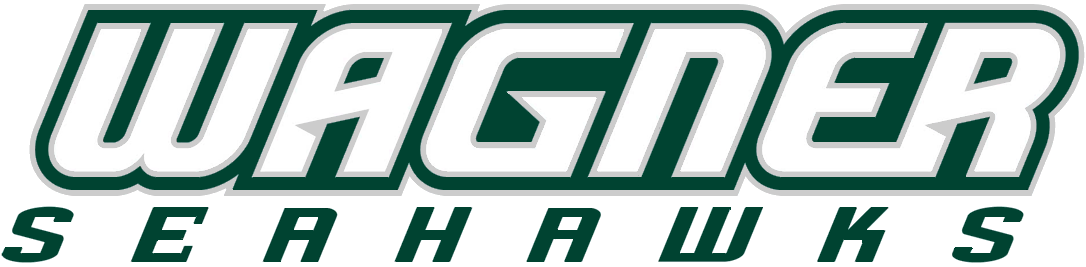
- Conference: Northeast Conference
- Record: 19–12 (12–6 NEC)
- Head coach: Bashir Mason (1st season)
- Assistant coaches: Mike Babul; Marquis Webb; Scott Smith
- Home arena: Spiro Sports Center

2012–13 Northeast Conference men's basketball standings
	Conf.				Overall
Team	W		L	PCT	W		L	PCT
Robert Morris	14	–	4	.778	24	–	11	.686
Bryant	12	–	6	.667	19	–	12	.613
Wagner	12	–	6	.667	19	–	12	.613
Long Island †	12	–	6	.667	20	–	14	.588
Mount St. Mary's	11	–	7	.611	18	–	14	.563
Quinnipiac	11	–	7	.611	15	–	16	.484
Central Connecticut	9	–	9	.500	13	–	17	.433
St. Francis Brooklyn	8	–	10	.444	12	–	18	.400
Sacred Heart	7	–	11	.389	9	–	20	.310
Monmouth	5	–	13	.278	10	–	21	.323
Saint Francis (PA)	5	–	13	.278	5	–	24	.172
Fairleigh Dickinson	2	–	16	.111	7	–	24	.226
† 2013 NEC tournament winner As of March 25, 2013; Rankings from AP Poll

The 2012–13 Wagner Seahawks men's basketball team represented Wagner College during the 2012–13 NCAA Division I men's basketball season. The Seahawks were led by the youngest men's head coach in NCAA Division I, Bashir Mason, who was 28 when he was elevated from an assistant position in March 2012 following the departure of Dan Hurley for Rhode Island. The Seahawks played their home games at Spiro Sports Center and were members of the Northeast Conference. They finished the season 19–12, 12–6 in NEC play to finish in a three-way tie for second place. They advanced to the semifinals of the Northeast tournament where they lost to Long Island. For the second consecutive year, despite a winning record, Wagner choose not to participate in a post season tournament.

== Roster ==
Number	Name	Position	Height	Weight	Year	Hometown
1	Jay Harris	Guard	6–1	160	Junior	Aurora, Illinois
4	Marcus Burton	Guard	6–0	170	Sophomore	Charlotte, North Carolina
5	Naofall Folahan	Center	6–11	215	Junior	Cotonou, Benin
11	Eric Fanning	Guard	6–4	205	Freshman	Trenton, New Jersey
12	Hugo Naurais	Forward	6–8	210	Sophomore	Nîmes, France
13	Langston Burnett	Guard	6–5	210	Freshman	Beltsville, Maryland
15	Kenneth Ortiz	Guard	6–0	200	Junior	Newark, New Jersey
21	Orlando Parker	Forward	6–8	205	Junior	Orlando, Florida
22	Dwaun Anderson	Guard	6–4	200	Freshman	Suttons Bay, Michigan
23	Jonathon Williams	Guard	6–6	225	Senior	Richmond, California
24	Latif Rivers	Guard	6–1	175	Junior	Elizabeth, New Jersey
25	Josh Thompson	Forward	6–5	200	Senior	Bridgeton, New Jersey
33	Mario Moody	Forward	6–7	210	Sophomore	East Orange, New Jersey

== Schedule ==
Date time, TV	Opponent	Result	Record	Site (attendance) city, state
Regular season
November 14*; 7:00 pm	at Delaware State	L 69–73 ^{OT}	0–1	Memorial Hall (1,178); Dover, DE
November 18*; 1:00 pm	at No. 8 Syracuse	L 57–88	0–2	Carrier Dome (17,273); Syracuse, NY
November 24*; 1:00 pm	at North Carolina Central	W 38–36	1–2	McLendon-McDougald Gymnasium (376); Durham, NC
November 26*; 7:00 pm	at Albany	L 63–66	1–3	SEFCU Arena (2,256); Guilderland, NY
November 28*; 7:00 pm	Princeton	W 48–42 ^{OT}	2–3	Spiro Sports Center (1,432); Staten Island, NY
December 1*; 2:00 pm	at Temple	L 62–70	2–4	Liacouras Center (5,371); Philadelphia, PA
December 4*; 7:00 pm	Hofstra	W 52–44	3–4	Mack Sports Complex (1,239); Hempstead, NY
December 15*; 4:00 pm	Coppin State	W 77–65 ^{OT}	4–4	Spiro Sports Center (1,303); Staten Island, NY
December 21*; 9:00 pm	vs. SMU; 46th Cable Car Classic	W 63–53	5–4	Leavey Center (1,530); Santa Clara, CA
December 22*; 11:15 pm	at Santa Clara; 46th Cable Car Classic	L 45–69	5–5	Leavey Center (1,523); Santa Clara, CA
December 29*; 4:00 pm	Penn	W 68–63 ^{OT}	6–5	Spiro Sports Center (1,234); Staten Island, NY
January 3; 7:00 pm	Monmouth	W 60–56	7–5 (1–0)	Spiro Sports Center (1,145); Staten Island, NY
January 5; 4:00 pm	Fairleigh Dickinson	W 68–55	8–5 (2–0)	Spiro Sports Center (1,107); Staten Island, NY
January 10; 7:00 pm	at Long Island	W 86–75	9–5 (3–0)	Athletic, Recreation & Wellness Center (1,129); Brooklyn, NY
January 12; 4:00 pm	St. Francis Brooklyn	L 52–71	9–6 (3–1)	Spiro Sports Center (1,846); Staten Island, NY
January 17; 7:00 pm	at Central Connecticut	L 66–73	9–7 (3–2)	William H. Detrick Gymnasium (2,217); New Britain, CT
January 19; 4:00 pm	at Bryant	L 59–82	9–8 (3–3)	Chace Athletic Center (876); Smithfield, RI
January 24; 7:00 pm	at Mount St. Mary's	W 52–50	10–8 (4–3)	Knott Arena (966); Emmitsburg, MD
January 26; 4:00 pm	at Saint Francis (PA)	W 81–56	11–8 (5–3)	DeGol Arena (1,002); Loretto, PA
January 31; 7:00 pm	Sacred Heart	W 84–78 ^{OT}	12–8 (6–3)	Spiro Sports Center (2,032); Staten Island, NY
February 2; 4:00 pm	Quinnipiac	L 69–74	12–9 (6–4)	Spiro Sports Center (1,720); Staten Island, NY
February 6; 7:00 pm	Mount St. Mary's	W 74–65	13–9 (7–4)	Spiro Sports Center (2,107); Staten Island, NY
February 9; 7:00 pm	at Robert Morris	L 79–83 ^{OT}	13–10 (7–5)	Charles L. Sewall Center (1,209); Moon Township, PA
February 14; 7:00 pm	Central Connecticut	W 101–82	14–10 (8–5)	Spiro Sports Center (1,132); Staten Island, NY
February 16; 4:00 pm	Bryant	W 89–75	15–10 (9–5)	Spiro Sports Center (1,657); Staten Island, NY
February 21; 7:00 pm	at St. Francis Brooklyn	L 75–76	15–11 (9–6)	Generoso Pope Athletic Complex (912); Brooklyn Heights, NY
February 24; 8:00 pm, ESPNU	Long Island	W 94–92	16–11 (10–6)	Spiro Sports Center (2,276); Staten Island, NY
February 28; 7:00 pm	at Fairleigh Dickinson	W 84–66	17–11 (11–6)	Rothman Center (413); Hackensack, NJ
March 2; 7:00 pm	at Monmouth	W 67–57	18–11 (12–6)	Multipurpose Activity Center (2,213); West Long Branch, NJ
2013 Northeast Conference men's basketball tournament
March 6; 7:00 pm	Central Connecticut; Quarterfinals	W 72–50	19–11	Spiro Sports Center (1,035); Staten Island, NY
March 9; 12:00 pm, MSG/FCS	Long Island; Semifinals	L 82–94	19–12	Spiro Sports Center (1,074); Staten Island, NY
*Non-conference game. ^{#}Rankings from AP Poll. (#) Tournament seedings in parentheses. All times are in Eastern Time.
