= 2012–13 Saint Francis Red Flash men's basketball team =

American college basketball season

2012–13 Saint Francis Red Flash men's basketball
- Conference: Northeast Conference
- Record: 5–24 (5–13 NEC)
- Head coach: Rob Krimmel (1st season)
- Assistant coaches: Chris Clark; Joey Goodson; Eric Taylor
- Home arena: DeGol Arena

2012–13 Northeast Conference men's basketball standings
	Conf.				Overall
Team	W		L	PCT	W		L	PCT
Robert Morris	14	–	4	.778	24	–	11	.686
Bryant	12	–	6	.667	19	–	12	.613
Wagner	12	–	6	.667	19	–	12	.613
Long Island †	12	–	6	.667	20	–	14	.588
Mount St. Mary's	11	–	7	.611	18	–	14	.563
Quinnipiac	11	–	7	.611	15	–	16	.484
Central Connecticut	9	–	9	.500	13	–	17	.433
St. Francis Brooklyn	8	–	10	.444	12	–	18	.400
Sacred Heart	7	–	11	.389	9	–	20	.310
Monmouth	5	–	13	.278	10	–	21	.323
Saint Francis (PA)	5	–	13	.278	5	–	24	.172
Fairleigh Dickinson	2	–	16	.111	7	–	24	.226
† 2013 NEC tournament winner As of March 25, 2013; Rankings from AP Poll

The 2012–13 Saint Francis Red Flash men's basketball team represented Saint Francis University during the 2012–13 NCAA Division I men's basketball season. The Red Flash, led by first year head coach Rob Krimmel, played their home games at the DeGol Arena and were members of the Northeast Conference.

They finished the season 5–24, 5–13 in NEC play to finish in a tie for tenth place. They failed to qualify for the Northeast Conference Basketball tournament.

== Roster ==
Number	Name	Position	Height	Weight	Year	Hometown
1	Umar Shannon	Guard	5–11	185	Junior	Atlantic City, New Jersey
5	Stephon Whyatt	Guard	6–1	155	Sophomore	Jersey City, New Jersey
10	Zachary Vigneault	Guard	6–0	174	Freshman	Ebensburg, Pennsylvania
11	Ben Millaud-Meunier	Guard	6–1	185	Freshman	Montreal, Quebec, Canada
12	Greg Brown	Guard	6–2	183	Freshman	Odenton, Maryland
14	Dominique Major	Guard	5–9	167	Sophomore	Woodbridge, Virginia
15	Earl Brown	Forward	6–6	206	Sophomore	Philadelphia, Pennsylvania
20	Aric Gresko	Guard	5–10	165	Freshman	Clymer, Pennsylvania
21	Kam Ritter	Forward	6–3	164	Junior	Niskayuna, New York
22	Ollie Jackson	Guard	6–3	163	Sophomore	Dallas, Texas
24	Matthew Mazzara	Guard	5–11	192	Sophomore	State College, Pennsylvania
30	Tony Peters	Forward	6–6	220	Senior	Roselle, New Jersey
32	Anthony Ervin	Guard	6–3	181	Senior	Chesterfield, Virginia
34	Storm Stanley	Center	6–11	272	Junior	Lambertville, Michigan
40	Ronnie Drinnon	Forward	6–7	225	Freshman	Jamestown, Ohio
42	Stephon Mosley	Forward	6–6	212	Freshman	West Orange, New Jersey

== Schedule ==
Date time, TV	Opponent	Result	Record	Site (attendance) city, state
Exhibition
11/02/2012*; 7:00 pm	Penn State–Altoona	W 85–38		DeGol Arena; Loretto, PA
Regular season
11/09/2012*; 7:00 pm	at Penn State	L 58–65	0–1	Bryce Jordan Center (7,329); University Park, PA
11/13/2012*; 7:00 pm	at Niagara	L 69–86	0–2	Gallagher Center (1,714); Lewiston, NY
11/16/2012*; 7:05 pm	at Youngstown State	L 60–75	0–3	Beeghly Center (2,023); Youngstown, OH
11/21/2012*; 5:00 pm	Colgate	L 76–85	0–4	DeGol Arena (652); Loretto, PA
11/24/2012*; 2:00 pm, ESPN3	at Notre Dame	L 52–69	0–5	Edmund P. Joyce Center (6,174); South Bend, IN
12/01/2012*; 2:00 pm	at American	L 51–61	0–6	Bender Arena (1,918); Washington, D.C.
12/04/2012*; 7:00 pm	at Lafayette	L 58–61	0–7	Kirby Sports Center (844); Easton, PA
12/08/2012*; 2:00 pm	Lehigh	L 67–83	0–8	DeGol Arena (1,526); Loretto, PA
12/17/2012*; 7:00 pm	Bucknell	L 49–76	0–9	DeGol Arena (721); Loretto, PA
12/20/2012*; 7:00 pm	at Kent State	L 48–77	0–10	M.A.C. Center (636); Kent, OH
12/28/2012*; 7:00 pm	Cornell	L 67–79	0–11	DeGol Arena (627); Loretto, PA
01/03/2013; 7:00 pm	Central Connecticut	W 67–60	1–11 (1–0)	DeGol Arena (581); Loretto, PA
01/05/2013; 4:00 pm	Bryant	L 58–78	1–12 (1–1)	DeGol Arena (622); Loretto, PA
01/10/2013; 7:00 pm	at Monmouth	L 60–65	1–13 (1–2)	Multipurpose Activity Center (1,263); West Long Branch, NJ
01/12/2013; 7:00 pm	at Fairleigh Dickinson	L 69–79 ^{OT}	1–14 (1–3)	Rothman Center (427); Hackensack, NJ
01/17/2013; 7:00 pm	Quinnipiac	L 66–75 ^{OT}	1–15 (1–4)	DeGol Arena (831); Loretto, PA
01/19/2013; 2:00 pm, ESPN3	Sacred Heart	L 72–75	1–16 (1–5)	DeGol Arena (1,310); Loretto, PA
01/24/2013; 7:00 pm	Robert Morris	L 70–84	1–17 (1–6)	DeGol Arena (1,411); Loretto, PA
01/26/2013; 4:00 pm	Wagner	L 56–81	1–18 (1–7)	DeGol Arena (1,002); Loretto, PA
01/31/2013; 7:00 pm	at Long Island	L 62–82	1–19 (1–8)	Athletic, Recreation & Wellness Center (1,013); Brooklyn, NY
02/02/2013; 5:00 pm	at St. Francis Brooklyn	W 64–61	2–19 (2–8)	Generoso Pope Athletic Complex (625); Brooklyn, NY
02/06/2013; 7:00 pm	at Robert Morris	L 48–60	2–20 (2–9)	Charles L. Sewall Center (1,366); Moon Township, PA
02/09/2013; 7:00 pm	Mount St. Mary's	L 58–69	2–21 (2–10)	DeGol Arena (1,236); Loretto, PA
02/14/2013; 7:00 pm	at Sacred Heart	W 64–60	3–21 (3–10)	William H. Pitt Center (331); Fairfield, CT
02/16/2013; 3:00 pm	at Quinnipiac	L 55–71	3–22 (3–11)	TD Bank Sports Center (1,687); Hamden, CT
02/21/2013; 7:00 pm	Fairleigh Dickinson	W 69–63	4–22 (4–11)	DeGol Arena (811); Loretto, PA
02/23/2013; 1:00 pm	Monmouth	W 70–68	5–22 (5–11)	DeGol Arena (1,131); Loretto, PA
02/28/2013; 7:00 pm	at Central Connecticut	L 81–84 ^{2OT}	5–23 (5–12)	William H. Detrick Gymnasium (1,495); New Britain, CT
03/02/2013; 4:00 pm	at Bryant	L 60–85	5–24 (5–13)	Chace Athletic Center (1,654); Smithfield, RI
*Non-conference game. ^{#}Rankings from AP Poll. (#) Tournament seedings in parentheses. All times are in Eastern Time.
