= 2012–13 Monmouth Hawks men's basketball team =

American college basketball season

2012–13 Monmouth Hawks men's basketball
- Conference: Northeast Conference
- Record: 10–21 (5–13 NEC)
- Head coach: King Rice (2nd season)
- Assistant coaches: Rick Callahan; Brian Reese; Derrick Phelps
- Home arena: Multipurpose Activity Center

2012–13 Northeast Conference men's basketball standings
	Conf.				Overall
Team	W		L	PCT	W		L	PCT
Robert Morris	14	–	4	.778	24	–	11	.686
Bryant	12	–	6	.667	19	–	12	.613
Wagner	12	–	6	.667	19	–	12	.613
Long Island †	12	–	6	.667	20	–	14	.588
Mount St. Mary's	11	–	7	.611	18	–	14	.563
Quinnipiac	11	–	7	.611	15	–	16	.484
Central Connecticut	9	–	9	.500	13	–	17	.433
St. Francis Brooklyn	8	–	10	.444	12	–	18	.400
Sacred Heart	7	–	11	.389	9	–	20	.310
Monmouth	5	–	13	.278	10	–	21	.323
Saint Francis (PA)	5	–	13	.278	5	–	24	.172
Fairleigh Dickinson	2	–	16	.111	7	–	24	.226
† 2013 NEC tournament winner As of March 25, 2013; Rankings from AP Poll

The 2012–13 Monmouth Hawks men's basketball team represented Monmouth University during the 2012–13 NCAA Division I men's basketball season. The Hawks, led by second year head coach King Rice, played their home games at the Multipurpose Activity Center and were members of the Northeast Conference. They finished the season 10–21, 5–13 in NEC play to finish in a tie for tenth place. They failed to qualify for the Northeast Conference Basketball tournament.

This was the Hawks last year as a member of the NEC as they joined the Metro Atlantic Athletic Conference for the 2013–14 season.

== Roster ==
Number	Name	Position	Height	Weight	Year	Hometown
1	Dion Nesmith	Guard	6–0	200	Senior	Union, New Jersey
3	Max DiLeo	Guard	6–1	175	Sophomore	Cinnaminson, New Jersey
4	Jalen Palm	Guard	5–10	165	Freshman	Louisville, Kentucky
5	Deon Jones	Guard	6–6	210	Sophomore	Wilmington, Delaware
10	Christian White	Guard	5–10	185	Freshman	Rochester, New York
11	Khalil Brown	Forward	6–9	190	Sophomore	South Orange, New Jersey
13	Andrew Nicholas	Guard	6–6	205	Sophomore	Wrightsville, Pennsylvania
14	Tyrone O'Garro	Forward	6–5	210	Freshman	Newark, New Jersey
21	Marcus Ware	Forward	6–8	215	Senior	Vineland, New Jersey
23	Stephen Spinella	Guard	6–4	200	Senior	Colts Neck, New Jersey
25	Jordan Cox	Forward	6–5	195	Senior	Houston, Texas
30	Collin Stewart	Guard	6–7	200	Freshman	Glenville, New York
32	Ed Waite	Forward	6–3	215	Senior	Fort Lauderdale, Florida

== Schedule ==
Date time, TV	Opponent	Result	Record	Site (attendance) city, state
Regular season
11/09/2012*; 7:00 pm	Hofstra	W 91–62	1–0	Multipurpose Activity Center (2,307); West Long Branch, NJ
11/12/2012*; 7:00 pm, ESPN3	at No. 20 Notre Dame; Coaches Vs. Cancer Classic	L 57–84	1–1	Edmund P. Joyce Center (7,427); South Bend, IN
11/17/2012*; 2:00 pm	at Rider	L 62–65	1–2	Alumni Gymnasium (1,517); Lawrenceville, NJ
11/19/2012*; 7:00 pm	at Georgia State; Coaches Vs. Cancer Classic	L 49–62	1–3	GSU Sports Arena (1,119); Atlanta, GA
11/20/2012*; 4:00 pm	vs. South Alabama; Coaches Vs. Cancer Classic	W 73–71	2–3	GSU Sports Arena (336); Atlanta, GA
11/21/2012*; 12:00 pm	vs. Tennessee State; Coaches Vs. Cancer Classic	W 81–70	3–3	GSU Sports Arena (369); Atlanta, GA
11/26/2012*; 7:00 pm	Lafayette	W 65–60	4–3	Multipurpose Activity Center (1,375); West Long Branch, NJ
12/03/2012*; 7:00 pm	at Binghamton	W 77–65	5–3	Binghamton University Events Center (2,271); Vestal, NY
12/05/2012*; 7:00 pm	Navy	L 66–85	5–4	Multipurpose Activity Center (1,930); West Long Branch, NJ
12/08/2012*; 7:00 pm, ESPN3	at No. 4 Syracuse	L 56–108	5–5	Carrier Dome (21,760); Syracuse, NY
12/12/2012*; 8:00 pm, ESPN3	at Maryland	L 38–71	5–6	Comcast Center (9,265); College Park, MD
12/22/2012*; 7:00 pm, ESPN3	Villanova	L 56–83	5–7	Multipurpose Activity Center (3,898); West Long Branch, NJ
12/31/2012*; 4:00 pm	at Fordham	L 71–82	5–8	Rose Hill Gymnasium (1,558); Bronx, NY
01/03/2013; 7:00 pm	at Wagner	L 56–60	5–9 (0–1)	Spiro Sports Center (1,145); Staten Island, NY
01/05/2013; 7:00 pm	at Mount St. Mary's	L 59–71	5–10 (0–2)	Knott Arena (1,142); Emmitsburg, MD
01/10/2013; 7:00 pm	Saint Francis (PA)	W 65–60	6–10 (1–2)	Multipurpose Activity Center (1,263); West Long Branch, NJ
01/12/2013; 7:00 pm	Robert Morris	L 55–70	6–11 (1–3)	Multipurpose Activity Center (1,705); West Long Branch, NJ
01/17/2013; 7:00 pm	at St. Francis Brooklyn	W 71–67	7–11 (2–3)	Generoso Pope Athletic Complex (405); Brooklyn, NY
01/19/2013; 4:30 pm	at Long Island	L 65–75	7–12 (2–4)	Athletic, Recreation & Wellness Center (1,054); Brooklyn, NY
01/24/2013; 7:00 pm	Fairleigh Dickinson	W 73–54	8–12 (3–4)	Multipurpose Activity Center (1,875); West Long Branch, NJ
01/26/2013; 7:00 pm	at Sacred Heart	L 68–82	8–13 (3–5)	William H. Pitt Center (1,614); Fairfield, CT
01/31/2013; 7:00 pm	Central Connecticut	L 58–78	8–14 (3–6)	Multipurpose Activity Center (1,205); West Long Branch, NJ
02/02/2013; 7:00 pm	Bryant	L 62–77	8–15 (3–7)	Multipurpose Activity Center (2,403); West Long Branch, NJ
02/07/2013; 7:00 pm	at Quinnipiac	L 63–79	8–16 (3–8)	TD Bank Sports Center (1,469); Hamden, CT
02/10/2013; 2:30 pm	at Fairleigh Dickinson	W 80–76	9–16 (4–8)	Rothman Center (375); Hackensack, NJ
02/14/2013; 7:00 pm	Long Island	L 66–80	9–17 (4–9)	Multipurpose Activity Center (1,005); West Long Branch, NJ
02/16/2013; 7:00 pm	St. Francis Brooklyn	W 73–64	10–17 (5–9)	Multipurpose Activity Center (2,053); West Long Branch, NJ
02/21/2013; 7:00 pm	at Robert Morris	L 65–77	10–18 (5–10)	Charles L. Sewall Center (631); Moon Township, PA
02/23/2013; 1:00 pm	at Saint Francis (PA)	L 68–70	10–19 (5–11)	DeGol Arena (1,131); Loretto, PA
02/28/2013; 7:00 pm	Mount St. Mary's	L 63–77	10–20 (5–12)	Multipurpose Activity Center (1,570); West Long Branch, NJ
03/02/2013; 7:00 pm	Wagner	L 57–67	10–21 (5–13)	Multipurpose Activity Center (2,213); West Long Branch, NJ
*Non-conference game. ^{#}Rankings from AP Poll. (#) Tournament seedings in parentheses. All times are in Eastern Time.
