= 2012–13 Bryant Bulldogs men's basketball team =

American college basketball season

2012–13 Bryant Bulldogs men's basketball
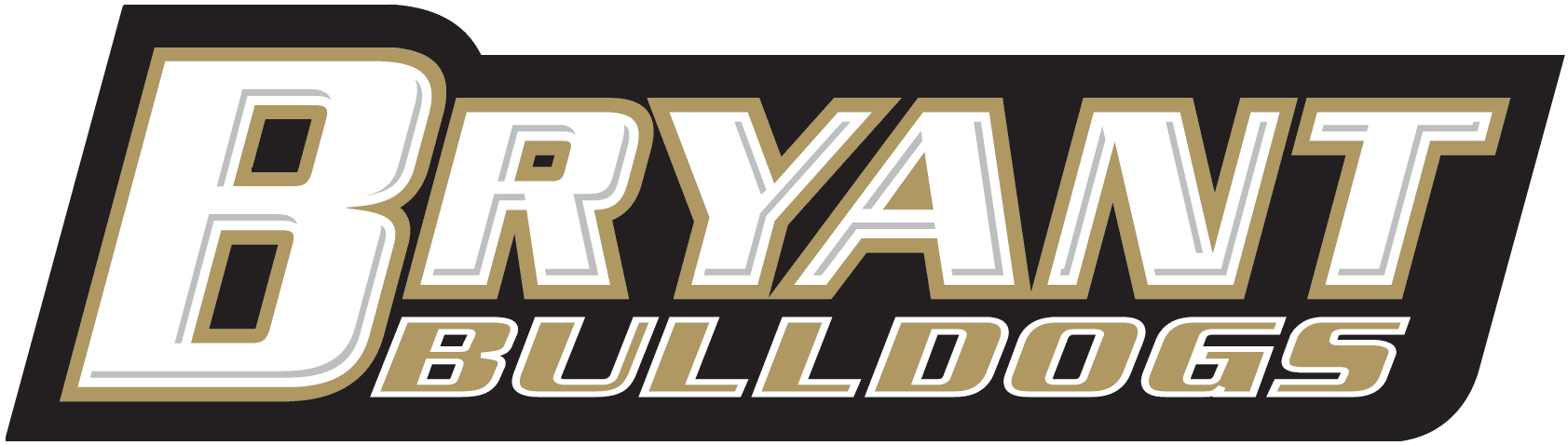

CBI, First Round
- Conference: Northeast Conference
- Record: 19–12 (12–6 NEC)
- Head coach: Tim O'Shea (5th season)
- Assistant coaches: Happy Dobbs; Mike Kelly; James Sorrentine
- Home arena: Chace Athletic Center

2012–13 Northeast Conference men's basketball standings
	Conf.				Overall
Team	W		L	PCT	W		L	PCT
Robert Morris	14	–	4	.778	24	–	11	.686
Bryant	12	–	6	.667	19	–	12	.613
Wagner	12	–	6	.667	19	–	12	.613
Long Island †	12	–	6	.667	20	–	14	.588
Mount St. Mary's	11	–	7	.611	18	–	14	.563
Quinnipiac	11	–	7	.611	15	–	16	.484
Central Connecticut	9	–	9	.500	13	–	17	.433
St. Francis Brooklyn	8	–	10	.444	12	–	18	.400
Sacred Heart	7	–	11	.389	9	–	20	.310
Monmouth	5	–	13	.278	10	–	21	.323
Saint Francis (PA)	5	–	13	.278	5	–	24	.172
Fairleigh Dickinson	2	–	16	.111	7	–	24	.226
† 2013 NEC tournament winner As of March 25, 2013; Rankings from AP Poll

The 2012–2013 Bryant Bulldogs men's basketball team represented Bryant University during the 2012–13 NCAA Division I men's basketball season. The team was led by fifth year head coach Tim O'Shea and played their home games at the Chace Athletic Center. They were members of the Northeast Conference. 2012–13 marked the first year Bryant was eligible to participate in NCAA division I postseason play after a four-year transition period. They finished the season 19–12, 12–6 in NEC play to finish in a three way tie for second place. They were invited to the 2013 College Basketball Invitational where they lost in the first round to Richmond.

== Roster ==
Number	Name	Position	Height	Weight	Year	Hometown
1	Corey Maynard	Guard	6–3	185	Junior	Adelaide, Australia
2	Curtis Oakley	Forward	6–4	215	Freshman	South Euclid, Ohio
3	Erick Smith	Guard	6–3	180	Senior	Bel Air, Maryland
4	Daniel Calandrillo	Guard	6–3	195	Senior	Leonardo, New Jersey
5	Frankie Dobbs	Guard	6–3	185	Senior	Berea, Ohio
10	Raphael Jordan	Guard	6–1	185	Senior	Bel Air, Maryland
11	Shane McLaughlin	Guard	6–1	185	Freshman	Old Tappan, New Jersey
12	Dyami Starks	Guard	6–2	195	Sophomore	Duluth, Minnesota
14	Andrew Scocca	Forward	6–8	235	Freshman	Melrose, Massachusetts
15	Vlad Kondratyev	Forward	6–8	225	Senior	Mykolaiv, Ukraine
20	Tim McKinney	Guard	6–5	210	Junior	Duxbury, Massachusetts
22	Declan Soukup	Guard	6–3	180	Freshman	Melbourne, Australia
23	Alex Francis	Forward	6–6	205	Junior	Harlem, New York
25	Patrick Matthews	Forward	6–6	220	Sophomore	Waipahu, Hawaii
33	Joe O'Shea	Guard	6–4	190	Sophomore	Burlington, Vermont
44	Claybrin McMath	Forward	6–8	210	Junior	Adelaide, Australia

== Schedule ==
Date time, TV	Opponent	Result	Record	Site (attendance) city, state
Exhibition
November 2*; 7:30 pm	Salve Regina	W 87–45		Chace Athletic Center (312); Smithfield, RI
Regular Season
November 9*; 8:00 pm	at No. 1 Indiana	L 54–97	0–1	Assembly Hall (17,472); Bloomington, IN
November 12*; 7:00 pm, ESPN3	at Providence	L 49–81	0–2	Dunkin' Donuts Center (4,307); Providence, RI
November 17*; 1:00 pm	New Hampshire	W 76–64	1–2	Chace Athletic Center (812); Smithfield, RI
November 21*; 7:00 pm	at Brown	W 68–61	2–2	Pizzitola Sports Center (1,509); Providence, RI
November 25*; 2:00 pm, ESPN3	at Boston College	W 56–54	3–2	Conte Forum (2,265); Chestnut Hill, MA
December 1*; 4:00 pm	Army	W 70–59	4–2	Chace Athletic Center (1,968); Smithfield, RI
December 5*; 7:00 pm	Yale	L 62–64	4–3	Chace Athletic Center (1,492); Smithfield, RI
December 8*; 1:00 pm	Binghamton	W 78–56	5–3	Chace Athletic Center (845); Smithfield, RI
December 10*; 7:00 pm	at Navy	L 59–69	5–4	Alumni Hall (673); Annapolis, MD
December 22*; 1:00 pm	Dartmouth	W 79–66	6–4	Chace Athletic Center (781); Smithfield, RI
December 29*; 7:00 pm	at Lehigh	W 80–79	7–4	Stabler Arena (1,559); Bethlehem, PA
January 3; 7:00 pm	at Robert Morris	W 84–77	8–4 (1–0)	Charles L. Sewall Center (478); Moon Township, PA
January 5; 4:00 pm	at Saint Francis (PA)	W 78–58	9–4 (2–0)	DeGol Arena (622); Loretto, PA
January 10; 7:00 pm	Quinnipiac	W 103–95	10–4 (3–0)	Chace Athletic Center (923); Smithfield, RI
January 12; 3:30 pm	at Central Connecticut	W 69–62	11–4 (4–0)	William H. Detrick Gymnasium (1,846); New Britain, CT
January 17; 7:00 pm	Mount St. Mary's	W 79–78 ^{OT}	12–4 (5–0)	Chace Athletic Center (909); Smithfield, RI
January 19; 4:00 pm	Wagner	W 82–59	13–4 (6–0)	Chace Athletic Center (876); Smithfield, RI
January 24; 7:00 pm	at Sacred Heart	L 76–87	13–5 (6–1)	William H. Pitt Center (728); Fairfield, CT
January 26; 4:00 pm	Long Island	L 78–79	13–6 (6–2)	Chace Athletic Center (2,368); Smithfield, RI
January 31; 7:00 pm, ESPN3	at Fairleigh Dickinson	W 78–63	14–6 (7–2)	Rothman Center (1,117); Teaneck, NJ
February 2; 7:00 pm	at Monmouth	W 77–62	15–6 (8–2)	Multipurpose Activity Center (2,403); West Long Branch, NJ
February 7; 7:00 pm, ESPN3	St. Francis Brooklyn	W 84–77	16–6 (9–2)	Chace Athletic Center (1,781); Smithfield, RI
February 11; 7:00 pm	Sacred Heart			Chace Athletic Center; Smithfield, RI
February 14; 7:00 pm	at Mount St. Mary's	L 70–84	16–7 (9–3)	Knott Arena (778); Emmitsburg, MD
February 16; 4:00 pm	at Wagner	L 75–89	16–8 (9–4)	Spiro Sports Center (1,657); Staten Island, NY
February 21; 7:00 pm	Central Connecticut	W 88–67	17–8 (10–4)	Chace Athletic Center (1,386); Smithfield, RI
February 23; 2:00 pm	at Quinnipiac	L 58–69	17–9 (10–5)	TD Bank Sports Center (2,867); Hamden, CT
February 25; 7:00 pm	Sacred Heart	W 84–68	18–9 (11–5)	Chace Athletic Center; Smithfield, RI
February 28; 7:00 pm	Robert Morris	L 75–77	18–10 (11–6)	Chace Athletic Center (2,680); Smithfield, RI
March 2; 4:00 pm	Saint Francis (PA)	W 85–60	19–10 (12–6)	Chace Athletic Center (1,654); Smithfield, RI
2013 Northeast Conference men's basketball tournament
March 6; 7:00 pm	Mount St. Mary's; Quarterfinals	L 69–75	19–11	Chace Athletic Center (2,680); Smithfield, RI
2013 College Basketball Invitational
March 20*; 7:00 pm	Richmond; First Round	L 71–76	19–12	Chace Athletic Center (1,854); Smithfield, RI
*Non-conference game. ^{#}Rankings from AP Poll. (#) Tournament seedings in parentheses. All times are in Eastern Time.
