= 2012–13 Fairleigh Dickinson Knights men's basketball team =

American college basketball season

2012–2013 Fairleigh Dickinson Knights men's basketball
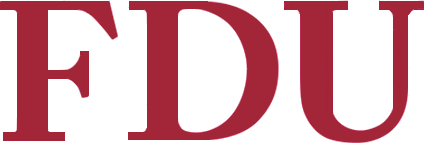
- Conference: Northeast Conference
- Record: 7–24 (2–16 NEC)
- Head coach: Greg Vetrone (4th season)
- Associate head coach: Marcus Toney-El
- Assistant coaches: Damon Francis; Chris Brickley
- Home arena: Rothman Center

2012–13 Northeast Conference men's basketball standings
	Conf.				Overall
Team	W		L	PCT	W		L	PCT
Robert Morris	14	–	4	.778	24	–	11	.686
Bryant	12	–	6	.667	19	–	12	.613
Wagner	12	–	6	.667	19	–	12	.613
Long Island †	12	–	6	.667	20	–	14	.588
Mount St. Mary's	11	–	7	.611	18	–	14	.563
Quinnipiac	11	–	7	.611	15	–	16	.484
Central Connecticut	9	–	9	.500	13	–	17	.433
St. Francis Brooklyn	8	–	10	.444	12	–	18	.400
Sacred Heart	7	–	11	.389	9	–	20	.310
Monmouth	5	–	13	.278	10	–	21	.323
Saint Francis (PA)	5	–	13	.278	5	–	24	.172
Fairleigh Dickinson	2	–	16	.111	7	–	24	.226
† 2013 NEC tournament winner As of March 25, 2013; Rankings from AP Poll

The 2012–13 Fairleigh Dickinson Knights men's basketball team represented Fairleigh Dickinson University during the 2012–13 NCAA Division I men's basketball season. The Knights, led by fourth-year head coach Greg Vetrone, played their home games at the Rothman Center and were members of the Northeast Conference (NEC). They finished the season 7–24, 2–16 in NEC play, to finish in last place. They failed to qualify for the Northeast Conference tournament.

Following the season, head coach Greg Vetrone's contract was not renewed. His overall record was 26–95 and just 16–55 in NEC play.

== Roster ==
Number	Name	Position	Height	Weight	Year	Hometown
0	Lonnie Hayes	Guard	6–0	120	Senior	Cincinnati, OH
2	Yves Jules	Guard	6–2	180	Junior	Brooklyn, NY
5	Melquan Bolding	Guard	6–3	195	Senior	Mt. Vernon, NY
10	Sekou Harris	Guard	5–11	165	Freshman	Plainfield, NJ
12	Sidney Sanders Jr.	Guard	5–11	175	Junior	Charleston, SC
20	Xavier Harris	Forward	6–6	230	Freshman	Philadelphia, PA
21	Dylan Moody	Guard	5–8	160	Sophomore	Philadelphia, PA
22	Mathias Seilund	Forward	6–7	205	Junior	Dragør, Denmark
23	Lonnie Robinson	Guard	6–5	220	Senior	Deerfield Beach, FL
24	Mustafaa Jones	Guard	6–3	180	Sophomore	Philadelphia, PA
34	Kyle Pearson	Forward	6–5	190	Freshman	Woodbridge, NJ
44	Kinu Rochford	Forward	6–6	235	Senior	Brooklyn, NY
55	Myles Mann	Forward	6–6	225	Freshman	Atlanta, GA

== Schedule ==
Date time, TV	Opponent	Result	Record	Site (attendance) city, state
Regular season
September 11, 2012*; 7:00 pm, FS Ohio	at Xavier	L 75–117	0–1	Cintas Center (9,711); Cincinnati, OH
November 18, 2012*; 2:00 pm, BTN	at Northwestern; South Padre Island Invitational	L 53–80	0–2	Welsh-Ryan Arena (5,104); Evanston, IL
November 20, 2012*; 8:05 pm	at Illinois State; South Padre Island Invitational	L 58–91	0–3	Redbird Arena (4,951); Normal, IL
November 23, 2012*; 1:00 pm	vs. Delaware State; South Padre Island Invitational	W 63–62	1–3	South Padre Island Convention Centre (N/A); South Padre Island, TX
November 24, 2012*; 2:15 pm	vs. Prairie View A&M; South Padre Island Invitational	W 84–70	2–3	South Padre Island Convention Centre (N/A); South Padre Island, TX
November 28, 2012*; 7:00 pm	at Saint Peter's	W 66–61	3–3	Yanitelli Center (1,028); Jersey City, NJ
January 12, 2012*; 7:00 pm	at Lehigh	L 62–102	3–4	Stabler Arena (2,024); Bethlehem, PA
July 12, 2012*; 7:00 pm	Lafayette	W 82–80	4–4	Rothman Center (652); Hackensack, NJ
September 12, 2012*; 4:00 pm	Hartford	L 59–69	4–5	Rothman Center (355); Hackensack, NJ
December 22, 2012*; 2:00 pm	at Vermont	L 62–76	4–6	Patrick Gym (2,013); Burlington, VT
December 29, 2012*; 4:00 pm	at VCU	L 67–96	4–7	Stuart C. Siegel Center (7,693); Richmond, VA
December 31, 2012*; 2:00 pm	at Longwood	W 79–71	5–7	Willett Hall (431); Farmville, VA
March 1, 2013; 7:00 pm	at Mount St. Mary's	W 72–65	6–7 (1–0)	Knott Arena (865); Emmitsburg, MD
May 1, 2013; 4:00 pm	at Wagner	L 55–68	6–8 (1–1)	Spiro Sports Center (1,107); Staten Island, NY
October 1, 2013; 7:00 pm	Robert Morris	L 54–88	6–9 (1–2)	Rothman Center (717); Hackensack, NJ
December 1, 2013; 7:00 pm	Saint Francis (PA)	W 79–69 ^{OT}	7–9 (2–2)	Rothman Center (427); Hackensack, NJ
January 14, 2013*; 7:00 pm	NJIT	L 63–66	7–10	Rothman Center (412); Hackensack, NJ
January 17, 2013; 7:00 pm	Long Island	L 75–79 ^{OT}	7–11 (2–3)	Rothman Center (317); Hackensack, NJ
January 19, 2013; 4:30 pm	at St. Francis Brooklyn	L 51–70	7–12 (2–4)	Generoso Pope Athletic Complex (455); Brooklyn, NY
January 24, 2013; 7:00 pm	at Monmouth	L 54–73	7–13 (2–5)	Multipurpose Activity Center (1,875); West Long Branch, NJ
January 26, 2013; 12:00 pm	at Quinnipiac	L 56–58	7–14 (2–6)	TD Bank Sports Center (1,964); Hamden, CT
January 31, 2013; 7:00 pm, ESPN3	Bryant	L 63–78	7–15 (2–7)	Rothman Center (1,117); Hackensack, NJ
February 2, 2013; 7:00 pm	Central Connecticut	L 71–80	7–16 (2–8)	Rothman Center (572); Hackensack, NJ
July 2, 2013; 7:00 pm	at Sacred Heart	L 70–77	7–17 (2–9)	William H. Pitt Center (359); Fairfield, CT
October 2, 2013; 2:30 pm	Monmouth	L 76–80	7–18 (2–10)	Rothman Center (375); Hackensack, NJ
February 14, 2013; 7:00 pm	St. Francis Brooklyn	L 61–85	7–19 (2–11)	Rothman Center (315); Hackensack, NJ
February 16, 2013; 4:30 pm	at Long Island	L 67–92	7–20 (2–12)	Athletic, Recreation & Wellness Center (1,358); Brooklyn, NY
February 21, 2013; 7:00 pm	at Saint Francis (PA)	L 63–69	7–21 (2–13)	DeGol Arena (811); Loretto, PA
February 23, 2013; 7:00 pm	at Robert Morris	L 46–89	7–22 (2–14)	Charles L. Sewall Center (1,623); Moon Township, PA
February 28, 2013; 7:00 pm	Wagner	L 66–84	7–23 (2–15)	Rothman Center (413); Hackensack, NJ
February 3, 2013; 4:30 pm	Mount St. Mary's	L 82–103	7–24 (2–16)	Rothman Center (1,215); Hackensack, NJ
*Non-conference game. ^{#}Rankings from AP poll. (#) Tournament seedings in parentheses. All times are in Eastern Time.
