= 2012–13 St. Francis Brooklyn Terriers men's basketball team =

American college basketball season

2012–13 St. Francis Terriers men's basketball
- Conference: Northeast Conference
- Record: 12–18 (8–10 NEC)
- Head coach: Glenn Braica (3rd season)
- Assistant coaches: Andy Johnston (5th season); Clive Bentick (6th season); Daniel Nigro (3rd season)
- Home arena: Generoso Pope Athletic Complex

2012–13 Northeast Conference men's basketball standings
	Conf.				Overall
Team	W		L	PCT	W		L	PCT
Robert Morris	14	–	4	.778	24	–	11	.686
Bryant	12	–	6	.667	19	–	12	.613
Wagner	12	–	6	.667	19	–	12	.613
Long Island †	12	–	6	.667	20	–	14	.588
Mount St. Mary's	11	–	7	.611	18	–	14	.563
Quinnipiac	11	–	7	.611	15	–	16	.484
Central Connecticut	9	–	9	.500	13	–	17	.433
St. Francis Brooklyn	8	–	10	.444	12	–	18	.400
Sacred Heart	7	–	11	.389	9	–	20	.310
Monmouth	5	–	13	.278	10	–	21	.323
Saint Francis (PA)	5	–	13	.278	5	–	24	.172
Fairleigh Dickinson	2	–	16	.111	7	–	24	.226
† 2013 NEC tournament winner As of March 25, 2013; Rankings from AP Poll

The 2012–2013 St. Francis Terriers men's basketball team represented St. Francis College during the 2012–13 NCAA Division I men's basketball season. The team was led by third year head coach Glenn Braica, who is the reigning NEC head coach of the year. The Terrier's home games were played at the Generoso Pope Athletic Complex. They also played 2 games at the new Barclays Center in Downtown Brooklyn against Long Island in a neutral site match up and St. John's in the inaugural Brooklyn Hoops Winter Festival. The team has been a member of the Northeast Conference since 1981. They finished the season at 12–18 overall and 8–10 in the NEC to finish in eighth place, which qualified them for the NEC Basketball Tournament. They lost in the quarterfinals of the Northeast Conference Basketball tournament to number one seed Robert Morris.

== Season outlook ==
In Glenn Braica's first two seasons the Terriers have made the NEC tournament. Going into this season Braica has a combined 30–30 record and is coming off of winning the 2012 NEC Coach of the Year Trophy. Last year the Terriers earned the fourth seed in the conference and hosted their first home playoff game since 1997. For the 2012–2013 season, Braica's Terriers were selected to finish fifth by the Northeast Conference men's basketball coaches. The Terriers had four of their five starters returning for the season. The only loss in the starting five was swingman and three-point specialist Stefan Perunicic. Perunicic is the program's second-leading three-point shooter of all-time. The Terriers also lost guard Justin Newton to graduation. Yet the Terriers saw the return of former starting guard Dre Calloway, who missed most of last season after having season-ending shoulder surgery in November 2011.

The Terriers returned four starters: Jalen Cannon, Akeem Johnson, Brent Jones and Ben Mockford. Power forward Jalen Cannon was selected to the 2012 NEC All-Rookie team and led the team in rebounding with 8.8 per game. Cannon also recorded 8 double-doubles. Forward-center Akeem Johnson had 3 20+ point games and started 26 out of 30 games. Johnson was also one of the more efficient players in the Northeast Conference with a 55% field goal mark. Point guard Brent Jones was last year's assists leader, averaging 3.9 per game. Jones took over the starting job down the stretch last year, starting 12 of the last 13 contests. Shooting guard Ben Mockford led the team in scoring with 11.8 points per game and started all 30 contests last year.

== Preseason signings ==
The Terriers announced that 6 ft 3 in combo guard Anthony White (Mastic, New York) and 6'4" shooting guard Aleksandar Isailovic (Belgrade, Serbia) had signed National Letters-of-Intent to enroll at the college in fall 2012. Anthony White came from William Floyd High School, where in his junior year he led his team in points, rebounds and assists. White was also an All-League selection, All-Conference, All-Suffolk County and was selected to the Newsday All-Long Island Team. Aleksander Isailovic is arriving from Collin College in Plano, Texas. Isailovic averaged 10.5 points, 2.7 rebounds, and 0.7 steals per game last season at Collin Community College and will have two years of eligibility as a Terrier.

== Regular season ==
For the second season in a row the Terriers opened their season mostly on the road, as they played 8 of their first 11 games away from The Pope. The Terriers completed the non-conference portion of their schedule at 4–7. The team won the season opener against Lafayette on the road, with four of the five Terrier starters scoring double digits. Jalen Cannon notched his first double-double of the season with 13 points and 13 rebounds and the Terriers led by a much as 17 on their way to a 76–65 win. The Terriers snapped a three-game losing streak against the Leopards and also won for the first time on opening night since November 9, 2007. The Terriers then lost to Illinois 64–89. The Illini were the Terriers most difficult opponent all year long, they went on to be ranked as high as 10th in the nation by the AP and Coaches Polls. The Terriers home opener at The Pope was against Army, the game saw the Terriers defeated 59–67. The Terriers closed the first half down by one point, 30–31, yet they never led in the second half as the Black Knights soundly defeated the Terriers. Jalen Cannon scored a career-high 23 points and grabbed 10 rebounds and classmate Kevin Douglas added 15 points and rejected a career-high three shots in the losing effort. The Terriers then traveled to Rhode Island to play at Brown, where they beat the Bears 76–72 in overtime. Mockford scored 8 of his 14 points in overtime to lead the Terriers in the victory. After a 2–2 start, the Terriers went on to lose 5 straight games against Norfolk State, Albany, Boston College, Stony Brook and St. John's. Against both Norfolk State and Boston College the Terriers had second-half leads of 11 and 9 points respectively, but in both cases were unable to hold on for the win. Against Albany, Stony Brook and St. John's, the Terriers were soundly defeated. The Terriers then won their last two non-conference games against Colgate and NJIT. The game against Colgate saw Jalen Cannon drop 24 points, a new career high, and Travis Nichols 20 points off the bench. At NJIT, Johnson had the game-winning layup with five seconds remaining and Cannon put up 23 points and grabbed 12 rebounds for his 5th double-double of the season.

The Terriers then beat Quinnipiac, to extend their winning streak to three games and win their first game of the conference schedule. The Terriers went on to finish conference play at 8–10 and qualify for the NEC tournament with the 8th seed. Their next game, at Sacred Heart, saw the Terriers lose in the final seconds of the contest 65–66, even though Cannon poured in 20 points and grabbed 16 rebounds for his 6th double-double. Against Mount St. Mary's the Terriers were led by Ben Mockford's 19 point performance to win 70–56. In that game 4 Terriers were in double figures for points scored. At Wagner, the Terriers who were underdogs beat the Seahawks by 19 points, 71–52. For the first time all season Coach Braica had to change his starting 5 by starting Aleksandar Isailovic in place of Kevin Douglas, who has an injured right hand. Travis Nichols came off the bench to score 20 points and grab 6 rebounds, which contributed to the Seahawks first loss at home this season. After the Terriers opened conference play at 3–1, they went on to go 5–9 in their next 14 contest. The Terriers lost 2 games a piece to Monmouth and Long Island, including the Battle of Brooklyn game. Down the stretch Mockford scored a career high 29 points against Mount St. Mary's and Kevin Douglas did not return to the line-up until the last game of the regular season against Sacred Heart. St. Francis Brooklyn has struggled closing out games this season. The Terriers have held a second-half lead in 22 of their 27 contests this season (exceptions are Illinois, Army, St. John's, Stony Brook, and Mount St. Mary's). St. Francis has held a second-half lead in 16 of 18 NEC contests but are just 8–10.

== NEC tournament ==
The 8th-seed Terriers traveled to 1st seed Robert Morris and lost 57–75; they were led by sophomore Jalen Cannon (15 points, 6 rebs).

== Roster ==
2012–13 St. Francis Terriers men's basketball team
Players
Coaches

Pos.	#	Name	Height	Weight	Year	Hometown
F	14	Travis Nichols	6 ft 4 in (1.93 m)	190 lb (86 kg)	Sr	Brooklyn, New York
F/C	30	Akeem Johnson	6 ft 6 in (1.98 m)	200 lb (91 kg)	Sr	Brooklyn, New York
G	32	Dre Calloway	6 ft 0 in (1.83 m)	170 lb (77 kg)	Sr	Harlem, New York
F/C	33	Matt Milk	6 ft 8 in (2.03 m)	220 lb (100 kg)	Jr	Wantagh, New York
F	12	Milos Trivic	6 ft 8 in (2.03 m)	210 lb (95 kg)	Jr	Belgrade, Serbia
G	3	Ben Mockford	6 ft 2 in (1.88 m)	175 lb (79 kg)	Jr	Shoreham-by-Sea, England
G	25	Aleksandar Isailovic	6 ft 4 in (1.93 m)	185 lb (84 kg)	Jr	Belgrade, Serbia
G/F	34	Kevin Douglas (injured)	6 ft 5 in (1.96 m)	210 lb (95 kg)	So	Bronx, New York
G	11	Phillip Santavenere	6 ft 2 in (1.88 m)	175 lb (79 kg)	So	Middletown, Connecticut
G	1	Brent Jones	5 ft 10 in (1.78 m)	170 lb (77 kg)	So	Bronx, New York
F	5	Jalen Cannon	6 ft 6 in (1.98 m)	230 lb (104 kg)	So	Allentown, Pennsylvania
F	23	Lowell Ulmer	6 ft 6 in (1.98 m)	210 lb (95 kg)	So	Staten Island, New York
G	25	Mike Nierva	5 ft 11 in (1.8 m)	175 lb (79 kg)	So	Staten Island, New York
G	44	Anthony White	6 ft 2 in (1.88 m)	190 lb (86 kg)	Fr	Mastic, New York

Head coach

- Glenn Braica (Queens College)

Assistant coach(es)

- Andy Johnston (New Hampshire)
- Daniel Nigro (St. Francis)
- Clive Bentick (Canisius)

Legend

- (C) Team captain
- (S) Suspended
- (I) Ineligible
- (W) Walk-on
- Injured
- Current redshirt

Roster
Last update: June 27, 2012

=== Depth chart ===
Pos.	Starting 5	Bench 1	Bench 2
C	Akeem Johnson (PF/C)	Matt Milk
PF	Jalen Cannon	Travis Nicols	Lowell Ulmer
SF	Kevin Douglas (SG/SF)	Aleksander Isailovic	Milos Trivic
SG	Ben Mockford	P.J. Santavenere
PG	Brent Jones	Dre Calloway	Anthony White (PG/SG)

== Schedule and results ==
Date time, TV	Opponent	Result	Record	High points	High rebounds	High assists	Site (attendance) city, state
Non-conference regular season
November 9, 2012*; 8:30 pm	at Lafayette	W 76–65	1–0	15 – Johnson	13 – Cannon	6 – Jones	Kirby Sports Center (1,217); Easton, PA
November 12, 2012*; 7:00 pm, ESPN3	at Illinois	L 64–89	1–1	13 – Johnson	11 – Cannon	5 – Jones	Assembly Hall (Champaign) (11,640); Champaign, IL
November 20, 2012*; 7:00 pm	Army; Homecoming	L 59–67	1–2	23 – Cannon	10 – Cannon	3 – Jones	Generoso Pope Athletic Complex (675); Brooklyn, NY
November 24, 2012*; 2:00 pm	at Brown	W 76–72 ^{OT}	2–2	20 – Cannon	5 – Cannon	6 – Calloway	Pizzitola Sports Center (454); Providence, RI
November 29, 2012*; 7:00 pm	at Norfolk State	L 79–85	2–3	16 – Cannon	9 – Cannon	6 – Jones	Joseph G. Echols Memorial Hall (3,376); Norfolk, VA
December 5, 2012*; 7:00 pm	at Albany	L 73–77	2–4	21 – Nichols	7 – Cannon	6 – Jones	SEFCU Arena (2,542); Guilderland, NY
December 8, 2012*; 2:00 pm, ESPN3	at Boston College	L 64–72	2–5	23 – Cannon	13 – Cannon	6 – Jones	Conte Forum (2,265); Chestnut Hill, MA
December 11, 2012*; 7:00 pm	Stony Brook	L 61–77	2–6	14 – Cannon, Douglas	8 – Cannon	5 – Jones	Generoso Pope Athletic Complex (262); Brooklyn, NY
December 15, 2012*; 5:00 pm	vs. St. John's; Brooklyn Hoops Winter Festival	L 60–77	2–7	14 – Cannon	12 – Cannon	8 – Calloway	Barclays Center (16,514); Brooklyn, NY
December 22, 2012*; 2:00 pm	Colgate	W 73–61	3–7	24 – Cannon	12 – Nichols	5 – Calloway	Generoso Pope Athletic Complex (607); Brooklyn, NY
December 30, 2012*; 4:20 pm	at NJIT	W 89–87	4–7	23 – Cannon	12 – Cannon	5 – Jones, Calloway	Fleisher Center (605); Newark, NJ
NEC regular season
January 3, 2013; 7:00 pm	at Quinnipiac	W 63–61	5–7 (1–0)	15 – Nichols	8 – Cannon	4 – Calloway	TD Bank Sports Center (1,258); Hamden, CT
January 5, 2013; 3:30 pm	at Sacred Heart	L 65–66	5–8 (1–1)	20 – Cannon	16 – Cannon	3 – Jones	William H. Pitt Center (589); Fairfield, CT
January 10, 2013; 7:00 pm	Mount St. Mary's	W 70–56	6–8 (2–1)	19 – Mockford	9 – Nichols	5 – Jones	Generoso Pope Athletic Complex (375); Brooklyn, NY
January 12, 2013; 4:00 pm	at Wagner	W 71–52	7–8 (3–1)	20 – Nichols	6 – Cannon, Nichols	4 – Calloway	Spiro Sports Center (1,846); Staten Island, NY
January 17, 2013; 7:00 pm	Monmouth	L 67–71	7–9 (3–2)	15 – Mockford	8 – Cannon	4 – Johnson	Generoso Pope Athletic Complex (405); Brooklyn, NY
January 19, 2013; 4:30 pm	Fairleigh Dickinson	W 70–51	8–9 (4–2)	15 – Nichols	10 – Cannon	6 – Jones	Generoso Pope Athletic Complex (455); Brooklyn, NY
January 24, 2013; 7:00 pm, FCS/MSG2	Long Island; Battle of Brooklyn	L 68–78	8–10 (4–3)	21 – Cannon	10 – Cannon	8 – Jones	Generoso Pope Athletic Complex (1,023); Brooklyn, NY
January 26, 2013; 3:30 pm	at Central Connecticut	L 70–72	8–11 (4–4)	18 – Cannon	14 – Cannon	4 – Jones	William H. Detrick Gymnasium (1,984); New Britain, CT
January 31, 2013; 7:00 pm	Robert Morris	W 71–61	9–11 (5–4)	16 – Cannon, Jones	10 – Johnson	6 – Jones	Generoso Pope Athletic Complex (575); Brooklyn, NY
February 2, 2013; 5:00 pm	Saint Francis (PA)	L 61–64	9–12 (5–5)	20 – Cannon	11 – Cannon	3 – Jones	Generoso Pope Athletic Complex (625); Brooklyn, NY
February 7, 2013; 7:00 pm, FCS/ESPN3	at Bryant	L 77–84	9–13 (5–6)	16 – Isailovic	9 – Cannon, Nichols	8 – Jones	Chace Athletic Center (1,781); Smithfield, RI
February 10, 2013; 12:00 pm	vs. Long Island	L 75–83	9–14 (5–7)	22 – Johnson	6 – Johnson	3 – Jones	Barclays Center (2,436); Brooklyn, NY
February 14, 2013; 7:00 pm	at Fairleigh Dickinson	W 85–61	10–14 (6–7)	21 – Johnson, Nichols	17 – Johnson	4 – Johnson	Rothman Center (315); Teaneck, NJ
February 16, 2013; 7:00 pm	at Monmouth	L 64–73	10–15 (6–8)	20 – Nichols	7 – Cannon	5 – Jones	Multipurpose Activity Center (2,053); West Long Branch, NJ
February 21, 2013; 7:00 pm	Wagner	W 76–75	11–15 (7–8)	18 – Mockford	7 – Cannon	3 – Calloway	Generoso Pope Athletic Complex (912); Brooklyn, NY
February 23, 2013; 3:30 pm	at Mount St. Mary's	L 65–73	11–16 (7–9)	29 – Mockford	11 – Cannon	6 – Jones	Knott Arena (1,305); Emmitsburg, MD
February 28, 2013; 7:00 pm	Quinnipiac	L 67–78	11–17 (7–10)	13 – Johnson, Mockford	8 – Cannon	5 – Jones	Generoso Pope Athletic Complex (400); Brooklyn, NY
March 2, 2013; 4:30 pm	Sacred Heart	W 92–80	12–17 (8–10)	22 – Mockford	8 – Cannon	7 – Calloway	Generoso Pope Athletic Complex (675); Brooklyn, NY
2013 NEC Tournament
March 6, 2013; 7:00 pm	at (1)Robert Morris; Quarterfinals	L 57–75	12–18	15 – Cannon	6 – Cannon, Johnson	3 – Johnson	Charles L. Sewall Center (1,788); Moon Township, PA
*Non-conference game. ^{#}Rankings from AP Poll. (#) Tournament seedings in parentheses. All times are in Eastern Time.

== Season statistics ==
Individual Player Statistics (As of April 7, 2013)
			Minutes		Scoring		Total FGs			3-point FGs			Free-Throws			Rebounds							
Player	GP	GS	Tot	Avg	Pts	Avg	FG	FGA	Pct	3FG	3FA	Pct	FT	FTA	Pct	Off	Def	Tot	Avg	A	TO	Blk	Stl
Cannon, Jalen	30	29	910	30.3	440	14.7	170	306	.556	6	24	.250	94	138	.681	103	161	264	8.8	20	43	11	30
Johnson, Akeem	30	30	764	25.5	301	10.0	110	232	.474	0	0	.000	81	119	.681	74	100	174	5.8	47	61	21	19
Mockford, Ben	30	26	858	28.6	332	11.1	106	272	.390	82	206	.398	38	47	.809	2	45	47	1.6	30	23	1	19
Douglas, Kevin	16	14	313	19.6	119	7.4	47	105	.448	18	48	.375	7	13	.538	13	41	54	3.4	6	18	9	6
Jones, Brent	30	28	626	20.9	179	6.0	67	183	.366	11	45	.244	34	62	.548	18	51	69	2.3	127	80	4	30
Nichols, Travis	28	1	499	17.8	269	9.6	95	220	.432	36	109	.330	43	47	.915	48	67	115	4.1	10	22	3	9
Calloway, Dre	29	2	555	19.1	152	5.2	55	126	.437	1	7	.143	41	83	.494	11	30	41	1.4	81	51	2	28
Santavenere, P. J.	27	0	298	11.0	82	3.0	27	82	.329	17	58	.293	11	13	.846	8	20	28	1.0	9	12	1	13
Isailovic, Aleksandar	30	15	531	17.7	101	3.4	33	122	.295	26	93	.280	9	10	0.900	5	35	40	1.3	18	13	4	17
Trivic, Milos	5	1	12	2.4	6	1.2	2	4	.500	2	3	.667	0	0	.000	0	2	2	0	0	0	0	0
White, Anthony	26	4	327	12.6	52	2.0	22	73	.301	2	19	.105	6	8	.750	17	28	45	1.7	25	18	6	15
Milk, Matt	27	0	144	5.3	19	0.7	8	16	.500	0	0	.000	3	5	.600	7	12	19	0.7	6	9	4	1
Ulmer, Lowell	24	0	183	7.6	53	2.2	20	56	.357	4	15	.267	9	20	.450	24	20	44	1.8	7	13	3	9
Nierva, Mike	4	0	5	1.3	3	0.8	1	2	.500	1	1	1.000	0	0	.000	1	1	2	0.5	1	1	0	0
Team																56	54	110			6		
Total	30		6025		2108	70.3	763	1789	0.426	206	628	0.328	376	565	0.665	387	667	1054	35.1	387	370	69	196
Opponents	30		6025		2143	71.4	763	1670	0.457	172	518	0.332	445	631	0.705	342	740	1082	36.1	416	403	98	183

Legend
GP	Games played	GS	Games started	Avg	Average per game
FG	Field-goals made	FGA	Field-goal attempts	Off	Offensive rebounds
Def	Defensive rebounds	A	Assists	TO	Turnovers
Blk	Blocks	Stl	Steals	High	Team high

== Awards and honors ==
Jalen Cannon

- College Sports Madness 2012–2013 Northeast Preseason All-Conference Fourth Team.
- Choice Hotels NEC Player of the Week award (December 24–30, 2012). Cannon guided the Terriers to back-to-back wins against NJIT and Colgate by averaging 23.5 points and 9.0 rebounds.
- All NEC-second team honors

Akeem Johnson

- College Sports Madness 2012–2013 Northeast Preseason All-Conference Second Team.

Travis Nichols

- College Sports Madness Mid-Major Conference Players of the Week award (January 7–13, 2013). Nichols paced the Terriers with 20 points off the bench at Wagner on 7-of-15 shooting, including 4-for-9 from 3-point range. Nichols also added 10 points and 9 rebounds versus Mount St. Mary's. Nichols has been in double-figures in four of his last six contests and is averaging 12.0 points in just 20.3 minutes per game during the stretch.

== See also ==
- 2012–13 St. Francis Brooklyn Terriers women's basketball team
