= 2012–13 Robert Morris Colonials men's basketball team =

American college basketball season

2012–13 Robert Morris Colonials men's basketball

NEC Regular Season Champions

NIT, Second Round
- Conference: Northeast Conference
- Record: 24–11 (14–4 NEC)
- Head coach: Andrew Toole (3rd season)
- Assistant coaches: Michael Byrnes; Matt Hahn; Robby Pridgen
- Home arena: Charles L. Sewall Center

2012–13 Northeast Conference men's basketball standings
	Conf.				Overall
Team	W		L	PCT	W		L	PCT
Robert Morris	14	–	4	.778	24	–	11	.686
Bryant	12	–	6	.667	19	–	12	.613
Wagner	12	–	6	.667	19	–	12	.613
Long Island †	12	–	6	.667	20	–	14	.588
Mount St. Mary's	11	–	7	.611	18	–	14	.563
Quinnipiac	11	–	7	.611	15	–	16	.484
Central Connecticut	9	–	9	.500	13	–	17	.433
St. Francis Brooklyn	8	–	10	.444	12	–	18	.400
Sacred Heart	7	–	11	.389	9	–	20	.310
Monmouth	5	–	13	.278	10	–	21	.323
Saint Francis (PA)	5	–	13	.278	5	–	24	.172
Fairleigh Dickinson	2	–	16	.111	7	–	24	.226
† 2013 NEC tournament winner As of March 25, 2013; Rankings from AP Poll

The 2012–13 Robert Morris Colonials men's basketball team represented Robert Morris University during the 2012–13 NCAA Division I men's basketball season. The Colonials, led by third year head coach Andrew Toole, played their home games at the Charles L. Sewall Center and were members of the Northeast Conference.

They finished the season 24–11, 14–4 in NEC play to be regular season NEC champions. They lost in the semifinals of the Northeast Conference tournament to Mount St. Mary's. As a regular season conference champion who failed to win their conference tournament, they earned an automatic bid to the 2013 NIT where they hosted and defeated Kentucky in the first round before losing in the second round at Providence.

== Roster ==
Number	Name	Position	Height	Weight	Year	Hometown
1	Mike McFadden	Forward	6–8	220	Junior	Newark, New Jersey
2	Velton Jones	Guard	6–0	170	RS Senior	Philadelphia, Pennsylvania
3	Coron Williams	Guard	6–2	170	RS Junior	Midlothian, Virginia
4	David Appolon	Guard	6–2	180	Sophomore	Philadelphia, Pennsylvania
5	Anthony Myers-Pate	Guard	5–11	170	Junior	Washington, D.C.
10	Treadwell Lewis	Guard	6–1	180	Senior	Shelton, Connecticut
11	Lijah Thompson	Forward/Center	6–7	215	Senior	Philadelphia, Pennsylvania
12	Jervon Pressley	Forward	6–7	210	Freshman	Charlotte, North Carolina
15	Karvel Anderson	Guard	6–2	190	Freshman	Chattanooga, Tennessee
20	Stephan Hawkins	Forward	6–9	205	Freshman	Gary, Indiana
22	Lucky Jones	Guard/Forward	6–5	220	Sophomore	Newark, New Jersey
24	Vaughn Morgan	Forward	6–6	235	Junior	Pittsburgh, Pennsylvania
25	Shane Sweigart	Guard	6–4	195	Senior	Harrisburg, Pennsylvania
34	Russell Johnson	Forward	6–6	180	RS Senior	Chester, Pennsylvania
45	Keith Armstrong	Forward	6–7	230	Sophomore	Raleigh, North Carolina

== Schedule ==
Date time, TV	Rank^{#}	Opponent^{#}	Result	Record	Site (attendance) city, state
Regular Season
November 9*; 7:00 pm		Rider	L 54–79	0–1	Charles L. Sewall Center (1,650); Moon Township, PA
November 12*; 8:30 pm		vs. Lehigh; NIT Season Tip-Off	L 60–89	0–2	Petersen Events Center (6,425); Pittsburgh, PA
November 13*; 6:00 pm		vs. Fordham; NIT Season Tip-Off	W 74–58	1–2	Petersen Events Center (6,425); Pittsburgh, PA
November 17*; 2:00 pm		at Xavier	L 59–61	1–3	Cintas Center (9,714); Cincinnati, OH
November 19*; 7:30 pm		Bowling Green; NIT Season Tip-Off	W 71–60	2–3	Charles L. Sewall Center (248); Moon Township, PA
November 20*; 7:30 pm		Cleveland State; NIT Season Tip-Off	W 71–62	3–3	Charles L. Sewall Center (230); Moon Township, PA
November 26*; 7:00 pm		at Savannah State	L 52–61	3–4	Tiger Arena (988); Savannah, GA
December 1*; 7:00 pm		Ohio	W 84–76	4–4	Charles L. Sewall Center (1,163); Moon Township, PA
December 4*; 7:00 pm		at Campbell	W 61–58	5–4	John W. Pope, Jr. Convocation Center (1,318); Buies Creek, NC
December 8*; 2:00 pm		at Hampton	W 66–54	6–4	Hampton Convocation Center (1,254); Hampton, VA
December 15*; 7:00 pm		Duquesne	W 91–69	7–4	Charles L. Sewall Center (2,093); Moon Township, PA
December 18*; 8:00 pm		at Louisiana–Lafayette	W 66–61	8–4	Cajundome (1,856); Lafayette, LA
December 20*; 8:00 pm, ESPN3		at Arkansas	L 74–79	8–5	Bud Walton Arena (11,887); Fayetteville, AR
January 3; 7:00 pm		Bryant	L 77–84	8–6 (0–1)	Charles L. Sewall Center (478); Moon Township, PA
January 5; 7:00 pm		Central Connecticut	L 70–77	8–7 (0–2)	Charles L. Sewall Center (577); Moon Township, PA
January 10; 7:00 pm		at Fairleigh Dickinson	W 88–54	9–7 (1–2)	Rothman Center (717); Teaneck, NJ
January 12; 7:00 pm		at Monmouth	W 70–55	10–7 (2–2)	Multipurpose Activity Center (1,705); West Long Branch, NJ
January 17; 7:00 pm		Sacred Heart	W 66–62	11–7 (3–2)	Charles L. Sewall Center (783); Moon Township, PA
January 19; 7:00 pm		Quinnipiac	W 87–75	12–7 (4–2)	Charles L. Sewall Center (1,079); Moon Township, PA
January 24; 7:00 pm		at Saint Francis (PA)	W 84–70	13–7 (5–2)	DeGol Arena (1,411); Loretto, PA
January 26; 7:00 pm		Mount St. Mary's	W 76–68	14–7 (6–2)	Charles L. Sewall Center (1,121); Moon Township, PA
January 31; 7:00 pm		at St. Francis Brooklyn	L 61–71	14–8 (6–3)	Generoso Pope Athletic Complex (575); Brooklyn Heights, NY
February 2; 3:00 pm, ESPNU		at Long Island	W 60–57	15–8 (7–3)	Athletic, Recreation & Wellness Center (1,310); Brooklyn, NY
February 6; 7:00 pm		Saint Francis (PA)	W 60–48	16–8 (8–3)	Charles L. Sewall Center (1,366); Moon Township, PA
February 9; 7:00 pm		Wagner	W 83–79 ^{OT}	17–8 (9–3)	Charles L. Sewall Center (1,209); Moon Township, PA
February 14; 7:30 pm		at Quinnipiac	L 61–63	17–9 (9–4)	TD Bank Sports Center (1,639); Hamden, CT
February 16; 3:30 pm		at Sacred Heart	W 68–63	18–9 (10–4)	William H. Pitt Center (1,349); Fairfield, CT
February 21; 7:00 pm		Monmouth	W 77–65	19–9 (11–4)	Charles L. Sewall Center (631); Moon Township, PA
February 23; 7:00 pm		Fairleigh Dickinson	W 89–46	20–9 (12–4)	Charles L. Sewall Center (1,623); Moon Township, PA
February 28; 7:00 pm		at Bryant	W 77–75	21–9 (13–4)	Chace Athletic Center (2,680); Smithfield, RI
March 2; 11:30 am		at Central Connecticut	W 81–61	22–9 (14–4)	William H. Detrick Gymnasium (2,364); New Britain, CT
2013 Northeast Conference men's basketball tournament
March 6; 7:00 pm		St. Francis Brooklyn; Quarterfinals	W 75–57	23–9	Charles L. Sewall Center (1,788); Moon Township, PA
March 9; 2:30 pm, MSG/FCS		Mount St. Mary's; Semifinals	L 60–69	23–10	Charles L. Sewall Center (1,303); Moon Township, PA
2013 NIT
March 19*; 7:30 pm, ESPN	No. (8)	(1) Kentucky; First Round	W 59–57	24–10	Charles L. Sewall Center (3,444); Moon Township, PA
March 25*; 7:00 pm, ESPN3	No. (8)	at (4) Providence; Second Round	L 68–77	24–11	Dunkin' Donuts Center (7,149); Providence, RI
*Non-conference game. ^{#}Rankings from AP Poll. (#) Tournament seedings in parentheses. All times are in Eastern Time. (#) during NIT is seed within region.
