= Jack Perri =

American basketball coach

Current position
- Title: Head coach
- Team: Southern New Hampshire
- Conference: Northeast-10

Biographical details
- Born: 1975 (age 50–51); Manalapan Township, New Jersey, U.S.
- Education: Bentley University

Playing career
- 1993–1998: Bentley

Coaching career (HC unless noted)
- 1998–2004: Bentley (assistant)
- 2004–2005: Rhode Island College
- 2005–2007: Long Island (assistant)
- 2007–2012: Long Island (associate HC)
- 2012–2017: LIU Brooklyn
- 2017–2018: Boston University (assistant)
- 2018–present: Southern New Hampshire

Head coaching record
- Overall: 117-106

Accomplishments and honors

Championships
- LEC regular season (2005); NEC tournament (2013)

Awards
- LEC Coach of the Year (2005); Joe B. Hall National Coach of the Year (2013)

John Perri (born 1975) is the head men's basketball coach at Southern New Hampshire University. He previously served as the head men's basketball coach for LIU Brooklyn from 2012 to 2017, and was the head coach at Rhode Island College from 2004 to 2005. Perri also has been an assistant coach at his alma mater Bentley and Boston University.

Perri grew up in Manalapan Township, New Jersey and scored 1,200 points playing basketball at Manalapan High School.

== Head coaching record ==
Record table
Season	Team	Overall	Conference	Standing	Postseason
Rhode Island College Anchormen (Little East Conference, Division III) (2004–2005)
2004–05	Rhode Island College	20–9		T–1st	
Rhode Island College:		20–9 (.690)			
LIU Brooklyn Blackbirds (Northeast Conference, Division I) (2012–2017)
2012–13	Long Island	20–14	12–6	T–3rd	NCAA First Four
2013–14	LIU Brooklyn	9–20	4–12	9th	
2014–15	LIU Brooklyn	12–18	8–10	T–7th	
2015–16	LIU Brooklyn	16–15	9–9	T-6th	
2016–17	LIU Brooklyn	20–12	13–5	2nd	
LIU Brooklyn:		77–79 (.494)	46–42 (.523)		
Southern New Hampshire Penmen (Northeast-10 Conference, Division II) (2018–present)
2018–19	Southern New Hampshire	12–14	8–13	T–5th (Northeast)	
2019–20	Southern New Hampshire	16–12	9–10	T–5th (Northeast)	
2021–22	Southern New Hampshire	11-7	7-6		
2022–23	Southern New Hampshire	21-9	16-4		
2022–23	Southern New Hampshire	24-11	13-9		Elite 8 appearance
Southern New Hampshire:		77–47 (.621)	53–44 (.546)		
Total:		181–141 (.562)			
National champion Postseason invitational champion Conference regular season champion Conference regular season and conference tournament champion Division regular season champion Division regular season and conference tournament champion Conference tournament champion
