= 2012–13 Long Island Blackbirds men's basketball team =

American college basketball season

2012–13 Long Island Blackbirds men's basketball

Northeast tournament champions

NCAA Tournament East Region 16 Seed, First Four
- Conference: Northeast Conference
- Record: 20–14 (12–6 NEC)
- Head coach: Jack Perri (1st season)
- Assistant coaches: Mark Calzonetti; Jason Harris; Chuck Bridge
- Home arena: Athletic, Recreation & Wellness Center; Barclays Center

2012–13 Northeast Conference men's basketball standings
	Conf.				Overall
Team	W		L	PCT	W		L	PCT
Robert Morris	14	–	4	.778	24	–	11	.686
Bryant	12	–	6	.667	19	–	12	.613
Wagner	12	–	6	.667	19	–	12	.613
Long Island †	12	–	6	.667	20	–	14	.588
Mount St. Mary's	11	–	7	.611	18	–	14	.563
Quinnipiac	11	–	7	.611	15	–	16	.484
Central Connecticut	9	–	9	.500	13	–	17	.433
St. Francis Brooklyn	8	–	10	.444	12	–	18	.400
Sacred Heart	7	–	11	.389	9	–	20	.310
Monmouth	5	–	13	.278	10	–	21	.323
Saint Francis (PA)	5	–	13	.278	5	–	24	.172
Fairleigh Dickinson	2	–	16	.111	7	–	24	.226
† 2013 NEC tournament winner As of March 25, 2013; Rankings from AP Poll

The 2012–13 Long Island Blackbirds men's basketball team represented The Brooklyn Campus of Long Island University during the 2012–13 NCAA Division I men's basketball season. The Blackbirds, led by first year head coach Jack Perri, played their home games at the Athletic, Recreation & Wellness Center, with three home games at the brand new Barclays Center, and were members of the Northeast Conference. They finished the season 20–14, 12–6 in NEC play to finish in a three way tie for second place. They were champions of the NEC tournament for the third consecutive year to earn an automatic bid to the NCAA tournament where they lost in the First Four round to James Madison.

== Roster ==
2012–13 Long Island Blackbirds men's basketball team
Players
Coaches

Pos.	#	Name	Height	Weight	Year	Hometown
G	00	D. J. Griggs	6 ft 0 in (1.83 m)	170 lb (77 kg)	Fr	Lake Jackson, Texas
F	1	Jamal Olasewere	6 ft 7 in (2.01 m)	215 lb (98 kg)	Sr	Silver Spring, Maryland
G	3	C. J. Garner	5 ft 10 in (1.78 m)	160 lb (73 kg)	Sr	Silver Spring, Maryland
G	4	Garrell Martin	6 ft 2 in (1.88 m)	175 lb (79 kg)	So	Bronx, New York
G/F	5	Troy Joseph	6 ft 6 in (1.98 m)	200 lb (91 kg)	So	Toronto, Ontario
G	11	Brandon Thompson	6 ft 1 in (1.85 m)	185 lb (84 kg)	Jr	San Antonio, Texas
G	15	Jason Brickman	6 ft 0 in (1.83 m)	165 lb (75 kg)	Jr	San Antonio, Texas
F	20	Booker Hucks	6 ft 6 in (1.98 m)	210 lb (95 kg)	Sr	Bay Shore, New York
G/F	23	Gilbert Parga	6 ft 4 in (1.93 m)	205 lb (93 kg)	Jr	Pico Rivera, California
G	24	Kedar Edwards	6 ft 4 in (1.93 m)	190 lb (86 kg)	Fr	Brooklyn, New York
F	21	Kenny Onyechi	6 ft 8 in (2.03 m)	230 lb (104 kg)	Sr	Sugar Land, Texas
F	33	E. J. Reed	6 ft 6 in (1.98 m)	200 lb (91 kg)	Fr	Mesquite, Texas
F	34	Khalil Murphy	6 ft 8 in (2.03 m)	235 lb (107 kg)	So	Willingboro, New Jersey
F	42	Julian Boyd	6 ft 7 in (2.01 m)	230 lb (104 kg)	Sr	San Antonio, Texas

Head coach

- Jack Perri (Bentley)

Assistant coach(es)

- Mark Calzonetti (Bentley)
- Jason Harris (Rhode Island College)
- Chuck Bridge (Springfield)

Legend

- (C) Team captain
- (S) Suspended
- (I) Ineligible
- (W) Walk-on
- Injured
- Current redshirt

Roster
Last update: 2013-03-13

== Schedule ==
Date time, TV	Rank^{#}	Opponent^{#}	Result	Record	Site (attendance) city, state
Regular season
11/09/2012*; 5:45 pm, ESPN3		Morehead State; Barclays Center Classic	L 74–77	0–1	Barclays Center (N/A); Brooklyn, NY
11/12/2012*; 7:00 pm		at Lafayette; Barclays Center Classic	L 94–98 ^{OT}	0–2	Kirby Sports Center (907); Easton, PA
11/16/2012*; 7:00 pm, ESPN3		at Maryland; Barclays Center Classic	L 74–91	0–3	Comcast Center (12,785); College Park, MD
11/23/2012*; 7:00 pm, FS South		at No. 8 Kentucky; Barclays Center Classic	L 75–104	0–4	Rupp Arena (22,222); Lexington, KY
11/28/2012*; 7:00 pm		Columbia	W 70–61	1–4	Athletic, Recreation & Wellness Center (843); Brooklyn, NY
12/01/2012*; 4:30 pm		Lafayette	W 71–60	2–4	Athletic, Recreation & Wellness Center (795); Brooklyn, NY
12/08/2012*; 2:00 pm		Hofstra	W 88–84	3–4	Athletic, Recreation & Wellness Center (1,208); Brooklyn, NY
12/12/2012*; 8:00 pm		at Rice	W 97–70	4–4	Tudor Fieldhouse (1,172); Houston, TX
12/16/2012*; 4:00 pm		Manhattan	W 75–48	5–4	Athletic, Recreation & Wellness Center (1,142); Brooklyn, NY
12/19/2012*; 7:00 pm		at Saint Peter's	L 67–80	5–5	Yanitelli Center (1,158); Jersey City, NJ
12/22/2012*; 8:00 pm		vs. Seton Hall; Brooklyn Hoops Holiday Invitational	L 58–89	5–6	Barclays Center (N/A); Brooklyn, NY
12/29/2012*; 3:00 pm		at Lamar	L 80–81	5–7	Montagne Center (2,052); Beaumont, TX
01/03/2013; 7:00 pm		at Sacred Heart	L 73–77	5–8 (0–1)	William H. Pitt Center (358); Fairfield, CT
01/05/2013; 3:00 pm		at Quinnipiac	L 74–82	5–9 (0–2)	TD Bank Sports Center (1,952); Hamden, CT
01/10/2013; 7:00 pm		Wagner	L 75–86	5–10 (0–3)	Athletic, Recreation & Wellness Center (1,129); Brooklyn, NY
01/12/2013; 2:30 pm		Mount St. Mary's	W 86–72	6–10 (1–3)	Athletic, Recreation & Wellness Center (2,413); Brooklyn, NY
01/17/2013; 7:00 pm		at Fairleigh Dickinson	W 79–75 ^{OT}	7–10 (2–3)	Rothman Center (317); Hackensack, NJ
01/19/2013; 4:30 pm		Monmouth	W 75–65	8–10 (3–3)	Athletic, Recreation & Wellness Center (1,054); Brooklyn, NY
01/24/2013; 7:00 pm, FCS/MSG2		at St. Francis Brooklyn; Battle of Brooklyn	W 78–68	9–10 (4–3)	Generoso Pope Athletic Complex (1,023); Brooklyn Heights, NY
01/26/2013; 4:00 pm		at Bryant	W 79–78	10–10 (5–3)	Chace Athletic Center (2,368); Smithfield, RI
01/31/2013; 7:00 pm		Saint Francis (PA)	W 82–62	11–10 (6–3)	Athletic, Recreation & Wellness Center (1,013); Brooklyn, NY
02/02/2013; 3:00 pm, ESPNU		Robert Morris	L 57–60	11–11 (6–4)	Athletic, Recreation & Wellness Center (1,310); Brooklyn, NY
02/07/2013; 7:00 pm		at Central Connecticut	W 81–75	12–11 (7–4)	William H. Detrick Gymnasium (2,025); New Britain, CT
02/10/2013; 12:00 pm		vs. St. Francis Brooklyn	W 83–75	13–11 (8–4)	Barclays Center (2,436); Brooklyn, NY
02/14/2013; 7:00 pm		at Monmouth	W 80–66	14–11 (9–4)	Multipurpose Activity Center (1,005); West Long Branch, NJ
02/16/2013; 4:30 pm		Fairleigh Dickinson	W 92–67	15–11 (10–4)	Athletic, Recreation & Wellness Center (1,358); Brooklyn, NY
02/21/2013; 7:00 pm		at Mount St. Mary's	L 71–83	15–12 (10–5)	Knott Arena (1,302); Emmitsburg, MD
02/24/2013; 8:00 pm, ESPNU		at Wagner	L 92–94	15–13 (10–6)	Spiro Sports Center (2,276); Staten Island, NY
02/28/2013; 7:00 pm		Sacred Heart	W 70–68	16–13 (11–6)	Athletic, Recreation & Wellness Center (1,028); Brooklyn, NY
03/02/2013; 4:30 pm		Quinnipiac	W 96–90	17–13 (12–6)	Athletic, Recreation & Wellness Center (1,275); Brooklyn, NY
2013 Northeast Conference men's basketball tournament
03/06/2013; 7:00 pm		Quinnipiac; Quarterfinals	W 91–83	18–13	Athletic, Recreation & Wellness Center (1,006); Brooklyn, NY
03/09/2013; 12:00 pm, MSG/FCS		at Wagner; Semifinals	W 94–82	19–13	Spiro Sports Center (1,074); Staten Island, NY
03/12/2013; 7:00 pm, ESPN2		Mount St. Mary's; Championship Game	W 91–70	20–13	Athletic, Recreation & Wellness Center (1,700); Brooklyn, NY
2013 NCAA tournament
03/20/2013*; 6:40 pm, truTV	No. (16 E)	vs. (16 E) James Madison; First Four	L 55–68	20–14	UD Arena (12,027); Dayton, OH
*Non-conference game. ^{#}Rankings from AP Poll. (#) Tournament seedings in parentheses. All times are in Eastern Time. (#) during NCAA Tournament is seed with Region E=East.
