= 2013 Northeast Conference men's basketball tournament =

- Classification: Division I
- Season: 2012–13
- Teams: 8
- Site: campus sites
- Finals site: Steinberg Wellness Center; Brooklyn, New York
- Champions: Long Island (5th title)
- Winning coach: Jack Perri (1st title)
- MVP: C. J. Garner (Long Island)
- Attendance: 10,586 (total); 1,700 (championship)

2012–13 Northeast Conference men's basketball standings
	Conf.				Overall
Team	W		L	PCT	W		L	PCT
Robert Morris	14	–	4	.778	24	–	11	.686
Bryant	12	–	6	.667	19	–	12	.613
Wagner	12	–	6	.667	19	–	12	.613
Long Island †	12	–	6	.667	20	–	14	.588
Mount St. Mary's	11	–	7	.611	18	–	14	.563
Quinnipiac	11	–	7	.611	15	–	16	.484
Central Connecticut	9	–	9	.500	13	–	17	.433
St. Francis Brooklyn	8	–	10	.444	12	–	18	.400
Sacred Heart	7	–	11	.389	9	–	20	.310
Monmouth	5	–	13	.278	10	–	21	.323
Saint Francis (PA)	5	–	13	.278	5	–	24	.172
Fairleigh Dickinson	2	–	16	.111	7	–	24	.226
† 2013 NEC tournament winner As of March 25, 2013; Rankings from AP Poll

The 2013 Northeast Conference men's basketball tournament was held on March 6, 9, and 12, 2013. The tournament featured the league's top eight seeds. The tourney opened on Wednesday, March 6 with the quarterfinals, followed by the semifinals on Saturday, March 9 and the finals on Tuesday, March 12. LIU Brooklyn won the championship, its fifth, and received the conferences automatic bid to the 2013 NCAA tournament. This is LIU's third NEC tournament championship in a row, having won it the previous two years, they are the first NEC team to three-peat.

== Format ==
For the ninth straight year, the NEC Men's Basketball Tournament will consist of an eight-team playoff format with all games played at the home of the higher seed. After the quarterfinals, the teams will be reseeded so the highest remaining seed plays the lowest remaining seed in the semifinals.

== Seeds ==
Teams are seeded based on the final regular season standings, with ties broken under an NEC policy.

2013 NEC Men's Basketball Tournament seeds
Seed	School	Conference	Overall	Tiebreaker
1‡	Robert Morris	14–4	22–9	
2	Wagner	12–6	18–11	2–0 vs. Long Island
3	Long Island	12–6	17–13	1–0 vs. Bryant
4	Bryant	12–6	19–10	
5	Mount St. Mary's	11–7	16–13	1–0 vs. Quinnipiac
6	Quinnipiac	11–7	15–15	
7	Central Connecticut	9–9	13–16	
8	St. Francis Brooklyn	8–10	12–17	
‡ – NEC regular season champions. Overall records are as of the end of the regular season.

== Bracket ==
Quarterfinals; Wednesday, March 6 NEC Front Row
1	Robert Morris	75
8	St. Francis Brooklyn	57
4	Bryant	69
5	Mount St. Mary's	75
(Pairings are reseeded after the first round)
2	Wagner	72
7	Central Connecticut	50
3	Long Island	91
6	Quinnipiac	83

Reseeded Semifinals; Saturday, March 9 ESPN3, MSG, FCS
1	Robert Morris	60
5	Mount St. Mary's	69
2	Wagner	82
3	Long Island	94

Championship Game; Tuesday, March 12; ESPN2
5	Mount St. Mary's	70
3	Long Island	91

All games were played at the venue of the higher seed

== All-tournament team ==
Tournament MVP in bold.

Name	School	Pos.	Year	Ht.	Hometown
**C. J. Garner**	LIU Brooklyn	Guard	Senior	5-10	Silver Spring, Maryland
Jamal Olasewere	LIU Brooklyn	Forward	Senior	6-7	Silver Spring, Maryland
Jason Brickman	LIU Brooklyn	Guard	Junior	6-0	San Antonio, Texas
Rashad Whack	Mount St. Mary's	Guard	Junior	6-2	Hyattsville, Maryland
Jonathon Williams	Wagner	Forward	Senior	6-6	Richmond, California

== Game summaries ==
=== Quarterfinals: Robert Morris vs. St. Francis Brooklyn ===
Series History: RMU leads 39-26

Mar 6
7:00 pm EST

Recap

**Robert Morris Colonials** **75**, St. Francis Brooklyn Terriers 57
Scoring by half: 37-23, 38-34
Pts: Karvel Anderson 20; Rebs: Lucky Jones & Russel Johnson 7 Asts: Velton Jones 8	Pts: Jalen Cannon 15; Rebs: Jalen Cannon & Akeem Johnson 6 Asts: Akeem Johnson 3

Charles L. Sewall Center
Moon Township, PA
Attendance: 1,788
Referees: Rob Riley, Doug Aprahamian, Tom Corbett

=== Quarterfinals: Mount St. Mary's at Bryant ===
Series History:

Mar 6
7:00 pm EST

Recap

**Mount St. Mary's Mountaineers** **75**, Bryant Bulldogs 69
Scoring by half: 28-35, 47-34
Pts: Rashad Whack 19; Rebs: Rashad Whack 8 Asts: Rashad Whack 4	Pts: Alex Francis 25; Rebs: Four tied with 8 Asts: Frankie Dobbs & Shane McLaughlin3

Chace Athletic Center
Smithfield, RI
Attendance: 2,680
Referees: John Hughes, Dan Anderson, Ron Tyburski

=== Quarterfinals: Wagner vs. Central Connecticut ===
Series History:

Mar 6
7:00 pm EST

Recap

**Wagner Seahawks** **72**, Central Connecticut Blue Devils 50
Scoring by half: 32-19, 40-31
Pts: Jonathon Williams 20; Rebs: Orlando Parker 9 Asts: Kenneth Ortiz 7	Pts: Kyle Vinales 23; Rebs: Matt Hunter 10; Asts: Kyle Vinales 2

Spiro Sports Center
Staten Island, NY
Attendance: 1,035
Referees: Donnie Eppley, Jim Bruno, Brandon Cruz

=== Quarterfinals: Long Island vs Quinnipiac ===
Series History:

Mar 6
2:00 pm EST

Recap

**Long Island Blackbirds** **91**, Quinnipiac Bobcats 83
Scoring by half: 43-47, 48-36
Pts: C. J. Garner 30; Rebs: Jamal Olasewere & Kenny Onyechi 6 Asts: Jason Brickman 7	Pts: Ousmane Drame 23; Rebs: Jamee Jackson & Ousmane Drame 9 Asts: Dave Johnson 4

Steinberg Wellness Center
Brooklyn, NY
Attendance: 1,006
Referees: Guy Pagano, Andrew Maira, Wally Rutecki

=== Semifinal: Mount St. Mary's at Robert Morris ===
Series History:
Announcers:

MSG/FCS

Mar 9
2:30 pm EST

Recap

**Mount St. Mary's Mountaineers** **69**, Robert Morris Colonials 60
Scoring by half: 29-23, 40-37
Pts: Rashad Whack 26; Rebs: Kelvin Parker 8 Asts: Sam Prescott 4	Pts: Anthony Myers-Pate 15; Rebs: Russel Johnson 6 Asts: Mike McFadden 2

Charles L. Sewall Center
Moon Township, PA
Attendance: 1,303
Referees: Donnie Eppley, Brandon Cruz, Tom Fahey

=== Semifinal: Long Island at Wagner ===
Series History:
Announcers:

MSG/FCS

Mar 9
12:00 pm EST

Recap

**Long Island Blackbirds** **94**, Wagner Seahawks 82
Scoring by half: 49-29, 45-53
Pts: C. J. Garner 23; Rebs: Jamal Olasewere 12; Asts: Jason Brickman 10	Pts: Jonathon Williams 23; Rebs: Kenneth Ortiz 8 Asts: Kenneth Ortiz 9

Spiro Sports Center
Staten Island, NY
Attendance: 1,074
Referees: Earl Walton, Tom Courtney, Tom Regan

=== Championship: Long Island vs Mount St. Mary's ===
Series History:
Announcers:

ESPN2

Mar 12
7:00 pm EST

Recap

**Long Island Blackbirds** **91**, Mount St. Mary's Mountaineers 70
Scoring by half: 35-31, 56-39
Pts: C. J. Garner 31; Rebs: Jamal Olasewere 10; Asts: Jason Brickman 8	Pts: Sam Prescott 21; Rebs: Sam Prescott 5 Asts: Julian Norfleet 6

Steinberg Wellness Center
Brooklyn, NY
Attendance: 1,700
Referees: Guy Pagano, Rob Riley, Bill McCarthy
