= DeGol Arena =

Arena in Loretto, Pennsylvania, US

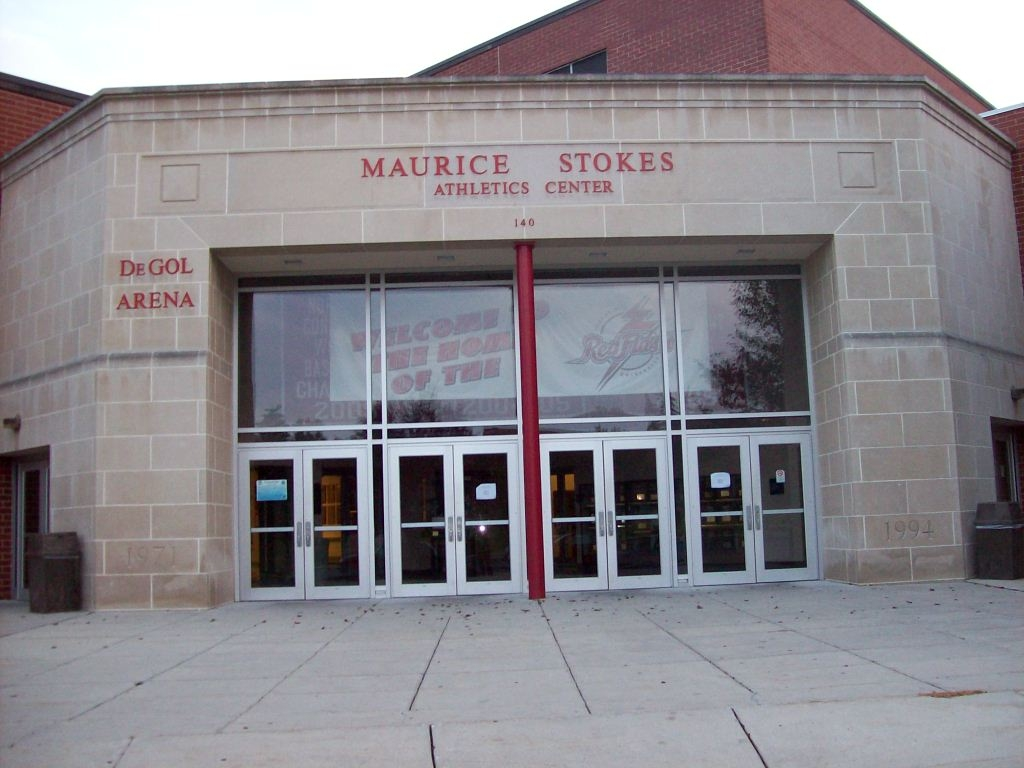
- Front entrance of the Stokes Center.
- Interactive map of DeGol Arena
- Location: 140 Lakeview Dr Loretto, Pennsylvania 15940
- Coordinates: 40.504612°N 78.6409007°W
- Owner: Saint Francis University
- Capacity: 3,500

Construction
- Built: 1971
- Renovated: 1994

Tenants
- Men's and Women's Basketball

DeGol Arena is a 3,500-seat multi-purpose arena in Loretto, Pennsylvania. It is home to the Saint Francis University Red Wolves men's and women's basketball teams and the men's and women's volleyball teams. It opened in 1972 and the 1991 Northeast Conference men's basketball tournament was held there. It was renovated in 1994 and again in 2005; it can hold 3,500 fans. The building was named after Bruno and Lena DeGol, the lead donors of the facelift project in 2005.

The arena is the centerpiece of the Maurice Stokes Athletic Center, which was named in honor of Maurice Stokes, who played basketball at Saint Francis from 1951–1955 and went on to a career as a pro in the NBA.

== See also ==
- List of NCAA Division I basketball arenas
