= William H. Detrick Gymnasium =

Multi-purpose arena in New Britain, Connecticut

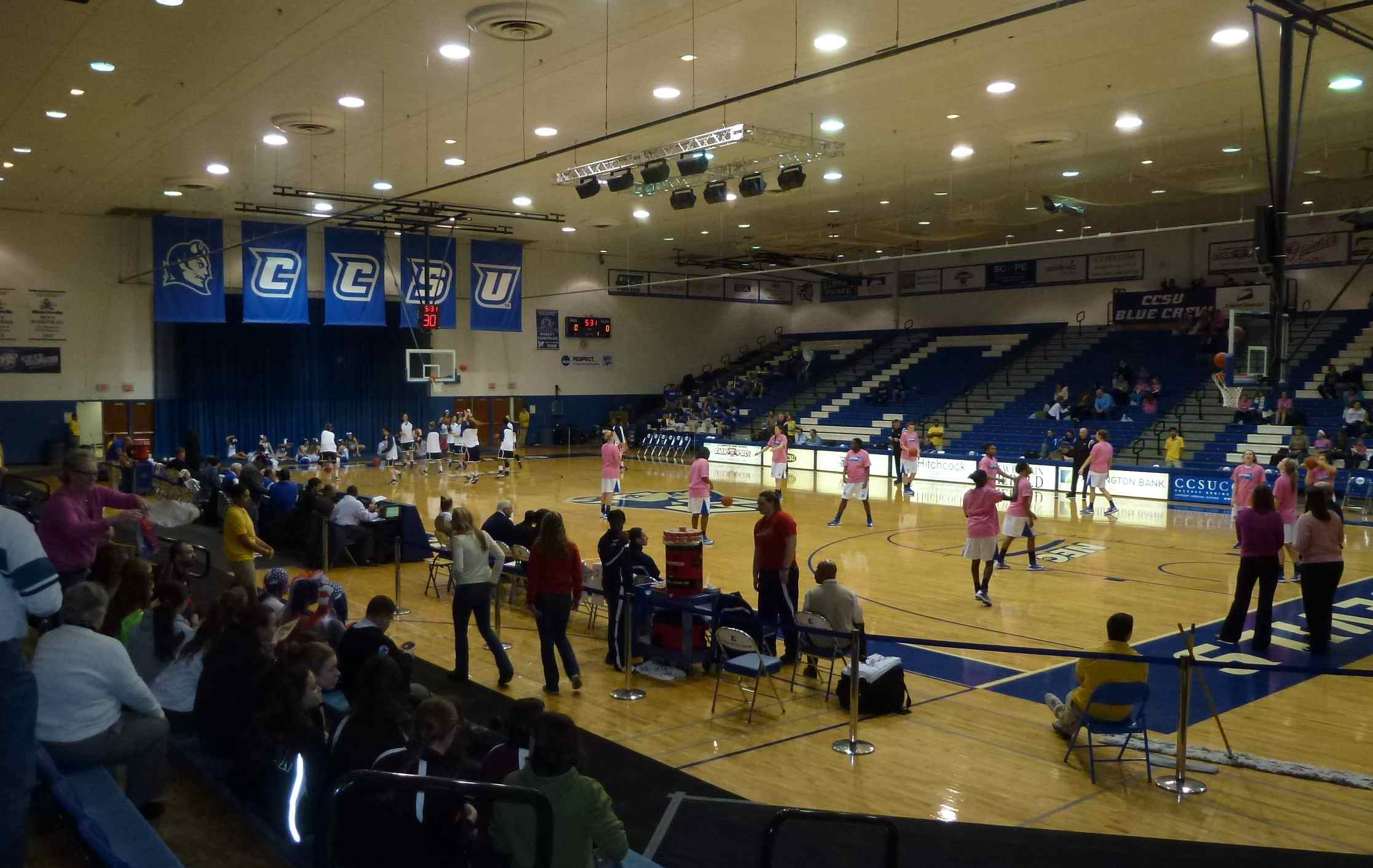
- Interactive map of William H. Detrick Gymnasium
- Location: 1615 Stanley Street; New Britain, Connecticut 06053
- Coordinates: 41.693°N 72.7649°W
- Owner: Central Connecticut State University
- Operator: Central Connecticut State University
- Capacity: 2,654
- Surface: Hardwood

Construction
- Opened: 1965

Tenants
- Central Connecticut State Blue Devils (NCAA)

William H. Detrick Gymnasium is a 2,654-seat multi-purpose arena in New Britain, Connecticut. It is home to the Central Connecticut State University Blue Devils men's and women's basketball teams and women's volleyball team. In 2005, the arena received a new floor, the first since the facility opened in 1965. The Northeast Conference men's basketball tournament was held there in 1998, 2002, and 2007. The facility is named after Bill Detrick, who was head coach at CCSU for 29 years, compiling a school-record 468 wins.

== History ==
In 2020–21, William H. Detrick Gymnasium celebrated its 55th season of Central Connecticut men's basketball. The Blue Devils’ historic home court ranks as the oldest in the Northeast Conference and is the fifth-oldest NCAA Division I home venue in New England.

1. Payne Whitney Gymnasium, Yale (1932)
2. Memorial Gymnasium, Maine (1935)
3. Lundholm Gymnasium, New Hampshire (1938)
4. Patrick Gymnasium, Vermont (1963)
5. Detrick Gymnasium, Central Connecticut (1965)

Under head coach Bill Detrick, for whom the gymnasium is named, the Blue Devils christened their new home court with a 109–57 win over Coast Guard on December 4, 1965. Central's Bob Plosky scored the first points in the gym's history with a basket at the 19:30 mark of the first half. Gene Reilly, who ranks eighth all-time in scoring at CCSU with 1,597 points, led the way with 21 points in front of a then-record crowd of 3,600 fans. The Blue Devils went on to win their first 10 home games at their new home and posted a 23–3 overall record, which included a trip to the 1966 NCAA College Division basketball tournament.

Detrick Gymnasium is part of the Kaiser Hall athletic building, a modern and spacious gymnasium at the time it ushered Central Connecticut's men's basketball program from NAIA era to NCAA Division II. Built in 1965 with a total capacity of 4,500, it was one of the largest on-campus basketball gym in all of New England, and remained the largest D-II basketball venue in New England until 1986, when CCSU joined the Division I ranks.

== See also ==
- List of NCAA Division I basketball arenas
