= 2012–13 Bucknell Bison men's basketball team =

American college basketball season

2012–13 Bucknell Bison men's basketball

Patriot League Tournament champions Patriot League regular season champions

NCAA tournament, Round of 64
- Conference: Patriot League
- Record: 28–6 (12–2 Patriot)
- Head coach: Dave Paulsen (5th season)
- Assistant coaches: Dane Fischer; Aaron Kelly; Charles Lee
- Home arena: Sojka Pavilion

2012–13 Patriot League men's basketball standings
	Conf.				Overall
Team	W		L	PCT	W		L	PCT
Bucknell †	12	–	2	.857	28	–	6	.824
Lehigh	10	–	4	.714	21	–	10	.677
Lafayette	10	–	4	.714	19	–	15	.559
Army	8	–	6	.571	16	–	15	.516
American	5	–	9	.357	10	–	20	.333
Colgate	5	–	9	.357	11	–	21	.344
Holy Cross	4	–	10	.286	12	–	18	.400
Navy	2	–	12	.143	8	–	23	.258
† 2013 Patriot League tournament winner

The 2012–13 Bucknell Bison men's basketball team represented Bucknell University during the 2012–13 NCAA Division I men's basketball season. The Bison, led by fifth year head coach Dave Paulsen, played their home games at Sojka Pavilion and were members of the Patriot League. They finished the season 28–6, 12–2 in Patriot League play to be crowned regular season champions. They were also champions of the Patriot League tournament to earn an automatic bid to the 2013 NCAA tournament. However, they lost in the second round to Butler.

== Roster ==
Number	Name	Position	Height	Weight	Year	Hometown
1	Joshea Singleton	Guard	6–3	212	Sophomore	Kinston, North Carolina
3	Steven Kasper	Guard	6–2	181	Sophomore	Lakeland, Tennessee
5	Colin Kiebon	Forward	6–8	233	Junior	Shamokin, Pennsylvania
10	Brian Fitzpatrick	Forward	6–8	238	Senior	Cheshire, Connecticut
11	Ryan Hill	Guard	6–3	202	Junior	Steelton, Pennsylvania
12	Bryson Johnson	Guard	6–2	194	Senior	Lyons Brook, Nova Scotia
14	Chris Hass	Guard	6–4	181	Freshman	Pellston, Michigan
15	Joe Willman	Forward	6–7	217	Senior	Tinton Falls, New Jersey
22	Cory Starkey	Forward	6–7	208	Sophomore	Petoskey, Michigan
25	Matt Banas	Forward	6–8	220	Freshman	Hershey, Pennsylvania
31	Mike Muscala	Forward/center	6–11	234	Senior	Roseville, Minnesota
32	Ryan Frazier	Guard	6–0	185	Freshman	Silver Spring, Maryland
33	Ben Brackney	Guard	6–6	208	Junior	Lincoln, Illinois
42	Cameron Ayers	Guard	6–5	203	Junior	Blue Bell, Pennsylvania
50	Don Hoffman	Forward	6–7	220	Freshman	Hawthorne, New Jersey

== Schedule ==
Date time, TV	Rank^{#}	Opponent^{#}	Result	Record	Site (attendance) city, state
Regular season
11/09/2012*; 7:00 pm		at Purdue; 2K Sports Classic	W 70–65	1–0	Mackey Arena (13,090); West Lafayette, IN
11/13/2012*; 7:00 pm		George Mason	W 61–56	2–0	Sojka Pavilion (3,272); Lewisburg, PA
11/16/2012*; 7:00 pm		at Niagara; 2k Sports Classic	W 88–71	3–0	Gallagher Center (1,814); Lewiston, NY
11/17/2012*; 5:30 pm		vs. New Mexico State; 2k Sports Classic	W 62–49	4–0	Gallagher Center (645); Lewiston, NY
11/18/2012*; 1:30 pm		vs. West Alabama; 2k Sports Classic	W 69–52	5–0	Gallagher Center (1,593); Lewiston, NY
11/23/2012*; 4:30 pm		at Penn State	L 57–60	5–1	Bryce Jordan Center (7,713); University Park, PA
11/27/2012*; 7:00 pm		Dartmouth	W 62–49	6–1	Sojka Pavilion (2,729); Lewisburg, PA
12/01/2012*; 7:00 pm		at Columbia	W 65–57	7–1	Levien Gymnasium (N/A); New York City, NY
12/04/2012*; 7:00 pm		Kent State	W 76–60	8–1	Sojka Pavilion (2,646); Lewisburg, PA
12/15/2012*; 7:00 pm		La Salle	W 74–66	9–1	Sojka Pavilion (3,402); Lewisburg, PA
12/17/2012*; 7:00 pm		at Saint Francis (PA)	W 76–49	10–1	DeGol Arena (721); Loretto, PA
12/19/2012*; 7:00 pm		Marist	W 71–65	11–1	Sojka Pavilion (2,724); Lewisburg, PA
12/22/2012*; 7:00 pm		at Princeton	L 67–79	11–2	Jadwin Gymnasium (3,090); Princeton, NY
12/28/2012*; 7:30 pm		at Loyola (MD)	W 66–46	12–2	Reitz Arena (2,100); Baltimore, MD
01/02/2013*; 7:00 pm		at Cornell	W 72–56	13–2	Newman Arena (1,471); Ithaca, NY
01/05/2013*; 4:00 pm, ESPN3		at No. 12 Missouri	L 64–66	13–3	Mizzou Arena (13,856); Columbia, MO
01/12/2013; 7:00 pm		Army	W 76–55	14–3 (1–0)	Sojka Pavilion (3,782); Lewisburg, PA
01/16/2013; 7:00 pm		at Colgate	W 73–59	15–3 (2–0)	Cotterell Court (612); Hamilton, NY
01/19/2013; 7:00 pm		Lafayette	W 66–51	16–3 (3–0)	Sojka Pavilion (3,719); Lewisburg, PA
01/23/2013; 6:00 pm, CBSSN		Lehigh	L 62–65	16–4 (3–1)	Sojka Pavilion (3,964); Lewisburg, PA
01/26/2013; 4:00 pm, CBSSN		at Holy Cross	W 65–58	17–4 (4–1)	Hart Center (3,229); Worcester, MA
01/30/2013; 7:30 pm		at American	W 56–55	18–4 (5–1)	Bender Arena (1,428); Washington, D.C.
02/02/2013; 7:00 pm		Navy	W 69–54	19–4 (6–1)	Sojka Pavilion (3,716); Lewisburg, PA
02/09/2013; 4:00 pm		at Army	W 60–58	20–4 (7–1)	Christl Arena (2,188); West Point, NY
02/13/2013; 7:00 pm		Colgate	W 69–61	21–4 (8–1)	Sojka Pavilion (2,956); Lewisburg, PA
02/16/2013; 2:00 pm		at Lafayette	L 62–63	21–5 (8–2)	Kirby Sports Center (3,244); Easton, PA
02/18/2013; 7:00 pm, CBSSN		at Lehigh	W 61–55	22–5 (9–2)	Stabler Arena (3,774); Bethlehem, PA
02/24/2013; 12:00 pm		Holy Cross	W 74–57	23–5 (10–2)	Sojka Pavilion (3,497); Lewisburg, PA
02/27/2013; 7:00 pm		American	W 66–47	24–5 (11–2)	Sojka Pavilion (3,084); Lewisburg, PA
03/02/2013; 7:00 pm		at Navy	W 62–46	25–5 (12–2)	Alumni Hall (4,833); Annapolis, MD
2013 Patriot League men's basketball tournament
03/06/2013; 7:00 pm		Navy; Quarterfinals	W 58–42	26–5	Sojka Pavilion (2,663); Lewisburg, PA
03/09/2013; 4:30 pm, CBSSN		Army; Semifinals	W 78–70	27–5	Sojka Pavilion (2,784); Lewisberg, PA
03/13/2013; 7:30 pm, CBSSN		Lafayette; Championship Game	W 64–56	28–5	Sojka Pavilion (3,645); Lewisberg, PA
2013 NCAA tournament
03/21/2013*; 12:40 pm, truTv	No. (11)	vs. No. (6) Butler; Second Round	L 56–68	28–6	Rupp Arena (14,622); Lexington, Kentucky
*Non-conference game. ^{#}Rankings from AP Poll. (#) Tournament seedings in parentheses. All times are in Eastern Time.
