= 2012–13 Navy Midshipmen men's basketball team =

American college basketball season

2012–13 Navy Midshipmen men's basketball
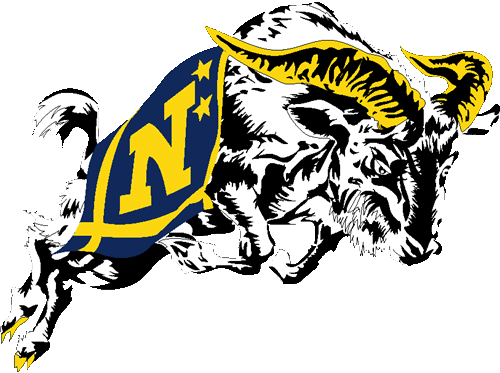
- Conference: Patriot League
- Record: 8–23 (2–12 Patriot)
- Head coach: Ed DeChellis (2nd season)
- Assistant coaches: Dan Earl; D.J. Black; Aaron Goodman; Ernie Nestor; Kendrick Saunders
- Home arena: Alumni Hall

2012–13 Patriot League men's basketball standings
	Conf.				Overall
Team	W		L	PCT	W		L	PCT
Bucknell †	12	–	2	.857	28	–	6	.824
Lehigh	10	–	4	.714	21	–	10	.677
Lafayette	10	–	4	.714	19	–	15	.559
Army	8	–	6	.571	16	–	15	.516
American	5	–	9	.357	10	–	20	.333
Colgate	5	–	9	.357	11	–	21	.344
Holy Cross	4	–	10	.286	12	–	18	.400
Navy	2	–	12	.143	8	–	23	.258
† 2013 Patriot League tournament winner

The 2012–13 Navy Midshipmen men's basketball team represented the United States Naval Academy during the 2012–13 NCAA Division I men's basketball season. The Midshipmen, led by second year head coach Ed DeChellis, played their home games at Alumni Hall and were members of the Patriot League. They finished the season 8–23, 2–12 in Patriot League play to finish in last place. They lost in the quarterfinals of the Patriot League tournament to Bucknell.

== Roster ==
Number	Name	Position	Height	Weight	Year	Hometown
0	Will Kelly	Forward	6–9	211	Freshman	Mount Laurel Township, New Jersey
1	Kendall Knorr	Guard	6–3	190	Freshman	Concord, North Carolina
2	Brennan Wyatt	Guard	5–8	168	Junior	Greensboro, North Carolina
3	James Loupos	Forward	6–6	197	Junior	Skillman, New Jersey
5	Kevin Alter	Guard	5–7	144	Sophomore	Rumson, New Jersey
10	Tilman Dunbar	Guard	5–10	153	Freshman	Woodbridge, Virginia
11	Thurgood Wynn	Guard	6–3	184	Junior	Bethesda, Maryland
14	Earl McLaurin	Guard	5–10	171	Sophomore	Charlotte, North Carolina
20	Ryan Spadaford	Guard	6–4	182	Freshman	Rockville Centre, New York
21	Worth Smith	Forward	6–6	203	Sophomore	Mooresville, North Carolina
22	Isaiah Roberts	Guard	6–1	176	Junior	Pennsauken Township, New Jersey
23	Donya Jackson	Guard	6–3	211	Sophomore	Baltimore, Maryland
24	Phil Guglielmo	Guard	6–5	186	Freshman	Springfield, Virginia
33	Brandon Venturini	Guard	6–0	180	Sophomore	Allendale, Michigan
34	Richard Kuzma	Guard	6–3	178	Freshman	Leesburg, Virginia
42	Jared Smoot	Center	6–10	247	Sophomore	Crown Point, Indiana
44	Jerome Alexander	Forward	6–6	192	Freshman	Radford, Virginia

== Schedule ==
Date time, TV	Opponent	Result	Record	Site (attendance) city, state
Exhibition
11/04/2012*; 12:00 pm	Slippery Rock	L 56–79		Alumni Hall; Annapolis, MD
Regular season
11/09/2012*; 7:00 pm	Marymount University	W 75–48	1–0	Alumni Hall (1,682); Annapolis, MD
11/11/2012*; 2:00 pm	Siena	L 49–54 ^{OT}	1–1	Alumni Hall (584); Annapolis, MD
11/14/2012*; 7:00 pm	Binghamton	W 75–52	2–1	Alumni Hall (709); Annapolis, MD
11/18/2012*; 4:00 pm	at UAB; South Padre Island Invitational	L 63–82	2–2	Bartow Arena (3,851); Birmingham, AL
11/20/2012*; 7:00 pm, FSSW	at TCU; South Padre Island Invitational	L 45–47	2–3	Daniel–Meyer Coliseum (3,829); Fort Worth, TX
11/23/2012*; 3:30 pm	vs. Prairie View A&M; South Padre Island Invitational	L 40–42	2–4	South Padre Island Convention Centre (N/A); South Padre Island, TX
11/24/2012*; 11:45 am	vs. Delaware State; South Padre Island Invitational	W 63–53	3–4	South Padre Island Convention Centre (N/A); South Padre Island, TX
11/28/2012*; 7:00 pm	IPFW	W 54–49	4–4	Alumni Hall (998); Annapolis, MD
12/01/2012*; 4:00 pm	at Tulane	L 41–51	4–5	Avron B. Fogelman Arena (1,609); New Orleans, LA
12/05/2012*; 7:30 pm	at Monmouth	W 85–66	5–5	Multipurpose Activity Center (1,930); West Long Branch, NJ
12/07/2012*; 7:00 pm	at Mount St. Mary's	L 65–72	5–6	Knott Arena (1,851); Emmitsburg, MD
12/10/2012*; 7:00 pm	Bryant	W 69–59	6–6	Alumni Hall (673); Annapolis, MD
12/22/2012*; 2:00 pm	Northern Kentucky	L 46–55	6–7	Alumni Hall (1,711); Annapolis, MD
12/28/2012*; 7:00 pm	Albany	L 61–71	6–8	Alumni Hall (2,431); Annapolis, MD
01/02/2013*; 7:00 pm	at IPFW	L 63–68	6–9	Allen County War Memorial Coliseum (1,411); Fort Wayne, IN
01/05/2013*; 5:00 pm	at Norfolk State	L 68–74	6–10	Joseph G. Echols Memorial Hall (2,411); Norfolk, VA
01/12/2013; 2:00 pm	at Lafayette	L 47–64	6–11 (0–1)	Kirby Sports Center (1,954); Easton, PA
01/16/2013; 7:00 pm	Holy Cross	L 47–62	6–12 (0–2)	Alumni Hall (1,647); Annapolis, MD
01/20/2013; 12:00 pm, CBSSN	at Army	W 59–50	7–12 (1–2)	Christl Arena (N/A); West Point, NY
01/23/2013; 7:00 pm	at American	L 49–72	7–13 (1–3)	Bender Arena (919); Washington, D.C.
01/26/2013; 7:00 pm	Colgate	L 56–70	7–14 (1–4)	Alumni Hall (2,351); Annapolis, MD
01/30/2013; 7:00 pm	Lehigh	L 49–71	7–15 (1–5)	Alumni Hall (2,559); Annapolis, MD
02/02/2013; 7:00 pm	at Bucknell	L 54–69	7–16 (1–6)	Sojka Pavilion (3,716); Lewisburg, PA
02/09/2013; 7:00 pm	Lafayette	L 47–70	7–17 (1–7)	Alumni Hall (3,212); Annapolis, MD
02/12/2013; 7:00 pm	at Holy Cross	L 57–66	7–18 (1–8)	Hart Center (803); Worcester, MA
02/16/2013; 2:00 pm, CBSSN	Army	L 55–56	7–19 (1–9)	Alumni Hall (5,710); Annapolis, MD
02/20/2013; 7:00 pm	American	W 50–44	8–19 (2–9)	Alumni Hall (1,953); Annapolis, MD
02/24/2013; 12:00 pm	at Colgate	L 46–59	8–20 (2–10)	Cotterell Court (542); Hamilton, NY
02/27/2013; 7:00 pm	at Lehigh	L 43–72	8–21 (2–11)	Stabler Arena (1,229); Bethlehem, PA
03/02/2013; 7:00 pm	Bucknell	L 46–62	8–22 (2–12)	Alumni Hall (4,833); Annapolis, MD
2013 Patriot League men's basketball tournament
03/06/2013; 7:00 pm	at Bucknell; Quarterfinals	L 42–58	8–23	Sojka Pavilion (2,663); Lewisburg, PA
*Non-conference game. ^{#}Rankings from AP Poll. (#) Tournament seedings in parentheses. All times are in Eastern Time.
