= 2012–13 Lafayette Leopards men's basketball team =

American college basketball season

2012–13 Lafayette Leopards men's basketball
- Conference: Patriot League
- Record: 19–15 (10–4 Patriot)
- Head coach: Fran O'Hanlon (18th season)
- Assistant coaches: Pat Doherty; Donovan Williams; John O'Connor
- Home arena: Kirby Sports Center

2012–13 Patriot League men's basketball standings
	Conf.				Overall
Team	W		L	PCT	W		L	PCT
Bucknell †	12	–	2	.857	28	–	6	.824
Lehigh	10	–	4	.714	21	–	10	.677
Lafayette	10	–	4	.714	19	–	15	.559
Army	8	–	6	.571	16	–	15	.516
American	5	–	9	.357	10	–	20	.333
Colgate	5	–	9	.357	11	–	21	.344
Holy Cross	4	–	10	.286	12	–	18	.400
Navy	2	–	12	.143	8	–	23	.258
† 2013 Patriot League tournament winner

The 2012–13 Lafayette Leopards men's basketball team represented Lafayette College during the 2012–13 NCAA Division I men's basketball season. The Leopards, led by 18th year head coach Fran O'Hanlon, played their home games at the Kirby Sports Center and were members of the Patriot League. They finished the season 19–15, 10–4 in Patriot League play to finish in a tie for second place. They advanced to the championship game of the Patriot League tournament where they lost to Bucknell. Despite their 19 wins, they did not participate in a postseason tournament.

== Roster ==
Roster
Number	Name	Position	Height	Weight	Year	Hometown
3	Tony Johnson	Guard	6–0	177	Senior	Folsom, California
4	Jack Detmer	Guard	6–2	181	Junior	Scarsdale, New York
5	Joey Ptasinsky	Guard	6–2	172	Sophomore	Highlands Ranch, Colorado
12	Seth Hinrichs	Guard	6–7	214	Sophomore	Clara City, Minnesota
14	Bryce Scott	Guard	6–2	185	Freshman	El Dorado Hills, California
20	Dan Trist	Forward	6–9	217	Sophomore	Sydney, Australia
21	Zach Rufer	Guard	6–3	180	Freshman	Bloomingburg, New York
22	Alan Flannigan	Forward	6–6	211	Sophomore	Dexter, Missouri
23	Les Smith	Guard	6–0	190	Junior	Cotati, California
24	Levi Giese	Forward	6–9	215	Senior	Tulsa, Oklahoma
34	Ben Freeland	Forward	6–10	215	Freshman	Santa Rosa, California
44	Billy Murphy	Forward	6–9	205	Freshman	Greenwich, Connecticut
54	Nathaniel Musters	Center	6–10	230	Freshman	Padstow, Australia

== Schedule ==
Date time, TV	Opponent	Result	Record	Site (attendance) city, state
Regular season
11/09/2012*; 8:30 pm	St. Francis (NY)	L 65–76	0–1	Kirby Sports Center (1,217); Easton, PA
11/12/2012*; 7:00 pm	Long Island; Barclays Center Classic	W 98–94 ^{OT}	1–1	Kirby Sports Center (907); Easton, PA
11/16/2012*; 7:00 pm, FS South/UK IMG	at No. 3 Kentucky; Barclays Center Classic	L 49–101	1–2	Rupp Arena (21,360); Lexington, KY
11/18/2012*; 2:00 pm	at Morehead State; Barclays Center Classic	L 74–88	1–3	Ellis Johnson Arena (2,431); Morehead, KY
11/20/2012*; 8:00 pm, RSN	at Maryland; Barclays Center Classic	L 74–83	1–4	Comcast Center (10,882); College Park, MD
11/24/2012*; 2:00 pm	Princeton	L 53–72	1–5	Kirby Sports Center (1,544); Easton, PA
11/26/2012*; 7:00 pm	at Monmouth	L 60–65	1–6	Multipurpose Activity Center (1,375); West Long Branch, NJ
11/28/2012*; 7:00 pm	Delaware	W 63–60	2–6	Kirby Sports Center (1,079); Easton, PA
12/01/2012*; 4:30 pm	at Long Island	L 60–71	2–7	Athletic, Recreation & Wellness Center (795); Brooklyn, NY
12/04/2012*; 7:00 pm	at Saint Francis (PA)	W 61–58	3–7	DeGol Arena (844); Loretto, PA
12/07/2012*; 7:00 pm	at Fairleigh Dickinson	L 80–82	3–8	Rothman Center (652); Hackensack, NJ
12/09/2012*; 2:00 pm	Sacred Heart	W 72–70	4–8	Kirby Sports Center (1,017); Easton, PA
12/18/2012*; 7:00 pm	Arcadia	W 86–62	5–8	Kirby Sports Center (524); Easton, PA
12/22/2012*; 7:00 pm, BTN	at No. 13 Minnesota	L 50–75	5–9	Williams Arena (14,625); Minneapolis, MN
12/29/2012*; 10:30 pm, Pac-12 Network	at Stanford	L 59–65	5–10	Maples Pavilion (4,941); Stanford, CA
01/02/2013*; 7:00 pm	NJIT	W 83–66	6–10	Kirby Sports Center (889); Easton, PA
01/08/2013*; 7:30 pm	at Penn	W 85–83	7–10	The Palestra (2,805); Philadelphia, PA
01/12/2013; 2:00 pm	Navy	W 64–47	8–10 (1–0)	Kirby Sports Center (1,954); Easton, PA
01/16/2013; 7:00 pm	at Army	L 54–77	8–11 (1–1)	Christl Arena (773); West Point, NY
01/19/2013; 7:00 pm	at Bucknell	L 51–66	8–12 (1–2)	Sojka Pavilion (3,719); Lewisburg, PA
01/23/2013; 7:00 pm, Lafayette Sports Network	Holy Cross	W 63–53	9–12 (2–2)	Kirby Sports Center (1,679); Easton, PA
01/27/2013; 12:00 pm	at Lehigh	W 78–57	10–12 (3–2)	Stabler Arena (3,279); Bethlehem, PA
01/30/2013; 7:00 pm	Colgate	W 69–40	11–12 (4–2)	Kirby Sports Center (2,470); Easton, PA
02/02/2013; 2:00 pm	at American	L 64–68	11–13 (4–3)	Bender Arena (1,209); Washington, D.C.
02/09/2013; 7:00 pm	at Navy	W 70–47	12–13 (5–3)	Alumni Hall (3,212); Annapolis, MD
02/13/2013; 7:00 pm	Army	L 68–85	12–14 (5–4)	Kirby Sports Center (1,071); Easton, PA
02/16/2013; 2:00 pm	Bucknell	W 63–62	13–14 (6–4)	Kirby Sports Center (3,244); Easton, PA
02/20/2013; 7:00 pm	at Holy Cross	W 79–76	14–14 (7–4)	Hart Center (1,238); Worcester, MA
02/24/2013; 12:00 pm	Lehigh	W 79–71	15–14 (8–4)	Kirby Sports Center (3,433); Easton, PA
02/27/2013; 7:00 pm	at Colgate	W 80–67	16–14 (9–4)	Cotterell Court (572); Hamilton, NY
03/02/2013; 12:00 pm	American	W 80–72	17–14 (10–4)	Kirby Sports Center (3,033); Easton, PA
2013 Patriot League men's basketball tournament
03/06/2013; 7:00 pm	Holy Cross; Quarterfinals	W 77–54	18–14	Kirby Sports Center (1,903); Easton, PA
03/09/2013; 2:00 pm, CBSSN	Lehigh; Semifinals	W 82–69	19–14	Kirby Sports Center (3,500); Easton, PA
03/13/2013; 7:30 pm, CBSSN	at Bucknell; Championship Game	L 56–64	19–15	Sojka Pavilion (3,645); Lewisburg, PA
*Non-conference game. ^{#}Rankings from AP Poll. (#) Tournament seedings in parentheses. All times are in Eastern Time.
