= 2012–13 Lehigh Mountain Hawks men's basketball team =

American college basketball season

2012–13 Lehigh Mountain Hawks men's basketball

CBI, First Round
- Conference: Patriot League
- Record: 21–10 (10–4 Patriot)
- Head coach: Brett Reed (6th season)
- Assistant coaches: Antoni Wyche; Ryan Krueger
- Home arena: Stabler Arena

2012–13 Patriot League men's basketball standings
| | Conf. | | | | Overall |
| Team | W | | L | PCT | W | | L | PCT |
|---|---|---|---|---|---|---|---|---|
| Bucknell † | 12 | – | 2 | .857 | 28 | – | 6 | .824 |
| Lehigh | 10 | – | 4 | .714 | 21 | – | 10 | .677 |
| Lafayette | 10 | – | 4 | .714 | 19 | – | 15 | .559 |
| Army | 8 | – | 6 | .571 | 16 | – | 15 | .516 |
| American | 5 | – | 9 | .357 | 10 | – | 20 | .333 |
| Colgate | 5 | – | 9 | .357 | 11 | – | 21 | .344 |
| Holy Cross | 4 | – | 10 | .286 | 12 | – | 18 | .400 |
| Navy | 2 | – | 12 | .143 | 8 | – | 23 | .258 |
† 2013 Patriot League tournament winner

The 2012–13 Lehigh Mountain Hawks men's basketball team represented Lehigh University during the 2012–13 NCAA Division I men's basketball season. The Mountain Hawks, led by sixth year head coach Brett Reed, played their home games at Stabler Arena and were members of the Patriot League. They finished the season 21–10, 10–4 in Patriot League play to finish in a tie for second play. They advanced to the semifinals of the Patriot League tournament where they lost to Lafayette. They were invited to the 2013 College Basketball Invitational where they lost in the first round to Wyoming.

== Roster ==
| Number | Name | Position | Height | Year | Hometown |
|---|---|---|---|---|---|
| 1 | Anthony D'Orazio | Guard | 6–2 | Junior | Camden, New Jersey |
| 3 | CJ McCollum | Guard | 6–3 | Senior | Canton, Ohio |
| 4 | Devon Carter | Guard | 6–4 | Freshman | Cleveland, Ohio |
| 5 | Cory Goodman | Guard | 6–1 | Senior | Philadelphia, Pennsylvania |
| 10 | B.J. Bailey | Guard | 6–3 | Junior | Mays Landing, New Jersey |
| 11 | Mackey McKnight | Guard | 6–0 | Junior | New Orleans, Louisiana |
| 15 | Corey Schaefer | Guard | 6–1 | Sophomore | Johnston, Iowa |
| 20 | Holden Greiner | Forward | 6–8 | Senior | Traverse City, Michigan |
| 21 | Stefan Cvkalj | Guard | 6–4 | Sophomore | Kitchener, Ontario |
| 23 | Tyrone Staggers | Forward | 6–5 | Sophomore | Chicago, Illinois |
| 31 | Jesse Chuku | Forward | 6–8 | Freshman | London, England |
| 40 | Justin Goldsborough | Forward | 6–8 | Freshman | Fort Washington, Maryland |
| 42 | Gabe Knutson | Forward | 6–9 | Senior | Urbandale, Iowa |
| 44 | Conroy Baltimore | Forward | 6–6 | Sophomore | The Bronx, New York |

== Schedule ==
| Date time, TV | Opponent | Result | Record | Site (attendance) city, state |
Regular season
| Nov 9*; 5:00 pm, FSSW | at No. 19 Baylor | L 77–99 | 0–1 | Ferrell Center (6,568); Waco, TX |
| Nov 12*; 8:30 pm | vs. Robert Morris; NIT Season Tip-Off | W 89–60 | 1–1 | Petersen Events Center (6,425); Pittsburgh, PA |
| Nov 13*; 9:00 pm, ESPNU | at Pittsburgh; NIT Season Tip-Off | L 53–78 | 1–2 | Petersen Events Center (7,225); Pittsburgh, PA |
| Nov 19*; 8:30 pm | Fairfield; NIT Season Tip-Off | W 82–67 | 2–2 | Stabler Arena (924); Bethlehem, PA |
| Nov 20*; 8:30 pm | Penn; NIT Season Tip-Off | W 73–66 | 3–2 | Stabler Arena (829); Bethlehem, PA |
| Nov 25*; 2:00 pm | at Sacred Heart | W 91–77 | 4–2 | William H. Pitt Center (636); Fairfield, CT |
| Nov 27*; 7:00 pm | at Quinnipiac | W 77–66 | 5–2 | TD Bank Sports Center (1,664); Hamden, CT |
| Dec 1*; 7:00 pm | Fairleigh Dickinson | W 102–62 | 6–2 | Stabler Arena (2,024); Bethlehem, PA |
| Dec 4*; 7:00 pm | Fordham | W 81–63 | 7–2 | Stabler Arena (1,351); Bethlehem, PA |
| Dec 8*; 2:00 pm | at Saint Francis (PA) | W 83–67 | 8–2 | DeGol Arena (1,526); Loretto, PA |
| Dec 20*; 8:00 pm | at North Texas | W 90–75 | 9–2 | The Super Pit (4,955); Denton, TX |
| Dec 29*; 7:00 pm | Bryant | L 79–80 | 9–3 | Stabler Arena (1,559); Bethlehem, PA |
| Jan 5*; 5:00 pm, NBCSN | at VCU | L 55–59 | 9–4 | Stuart C. Siegel Center (7,693); Richmond, VA |
| Jan 8*; 7:00 pm | Muhlenberg | W 81–46 | 10–4 | Stabler Arena (1,039); Bethlehem, PA |
| Jan 12; 2:00 pm, CBSSN | Holy Cross | W 79–47 | 11–4 (1–0) | Stabler Arena (2,172); Bethlehem, PA |
| Jan 16; 7:30 pm | at American | W 63–57 | 12–4 (2–0) | Bender Arena (1,029); Washington, D.C. |
| Jan 19; 7:00 pm | Colgate | W 60–45 | 13–4 (3–0) | Stabler Arena (2,709); Bethlehem, PA |
| Jan 23; 6:00 pm, CBSSN | at Bucknell | W 65–62 | 14–4 (4–0) | Sojka Pavilion (3,964); Lewisburg, PA |
| Jan 27; 12:00 pm, CBSSN | Lafayette | L 57–78 | 14–5 (4–1) | Stabler Arena (3,279); Bethlehem, PA |
| Jan 30; 7:00 pm | at Navy | W 71–49 | 15–5 (5–1) | Alumni Hall (2,559); Annapolis, MD |
| Feb 3; 1:00 pm | at Army | W 85–76 | 16–5 (6–1) | Christl Arena (1,002); West Point, NY |
| Feb 9; 7:00 pm | at Holy Cross | W 68–61 | 17–5 (7–1) | Hart Center (812); Worcester, MA |
| Feb 13; 7:00 pm | American | W 60–47 | 18–5 (8–1) | Stabler Arena (1,119); Bethlehem, PA |
| Feb 16; 2:00 pm | at Colgate | L 60–64 | 18–6 (8–2) | Cotterell Court (1,064); Hamilton, NY |
| Feb 18; 7:00 pm, CBSSN | Bucknell | L 55–61 | 18–7 (8–3) | Stabler Arena (3,774); Bethlehem, PA |
| Feb 24; 12:00 pm | at Lafayette | L 71–79 | 18–8 (8–4) | Kirby Sports Center (3,433); Easton, PA |
| Feb 27; 7:00 pm | Navy | W 72–43 | 19–8 (9–4) | Stabler Arena (1,229); Bethlehem, PA |
| Mar 2; 12:00 pm | Army | W 81–75 | 20–8 (10–4) | Stabler Arena (1,760); Bethlehem, PA |
2013 Patriot League men's basketball tournament
| Mar 6; 7:00 pm | Colgate; Quarterfinals | W 71–64 | 21–8 | Stabler Arena (1,364); Bethlehem, PA |
| Mar 9; 2:00 pm, CBSSN | at Lafayette; Semifinals | L 69–82 | 21–9 | Kirby Sports Center (3,500); Easton, PA |
2013 College Basketball Invitational
| Mar 19*; 9:00 pm, AXS TV | at Wyoming; First Round | L 66–67 | 21–10 | Arena-Auditorium (1,528); Laramie, WY |
*Non-conference game. ^{#}Rankings from AP Poll. (#) Tournament seedings in parentheses. All times are in Eastern Time.
