= 2013 Patriot League men's basketball tournament =

- Classification: Division I
- Season: 2012–13
- Teams: 8
- Site: Campus sites
- Champions: Bucknell (4th title)
- Winning coach: Dave Paulsen (2nd title)
- MVP: Mike Muscala (Bucknell)
- Television: CBS Sports Network

2012–13 Patriot League men's basketball standings
	Conf.				Overall
Team	W		L	PCT	W		L	PCT
Bucknell †	12	–	2	.857	28	–	6	.824
Lehigh	10	–	4	.714	21	–	10	.677
Lafayette	10	–	4	.714	19	–	15	.559
Army	8	–	6	.571	16	–	15	.516
American	5	–	9	.357	10	–	20	.333
Colgate	5	–	9	.357	11	–	21	.344
Holy Cross	4	–	10	.286	12	–	18	.400
Navy	2	–	12	.143	8	–	23	.258
† 2013 Patriot League tournament winner

The 2013 Patriot League men's basketball tournament was held March 6, 9 and 13 at campus sites of the higher seed. The winner of the tournament, the Bucknell Bison received an automatic bid to the NCAA tournament.

== Bracket ==
Quarterfinals; March 6
1	Bucknell	58
8	Navy	42
4	Army	65
5	American	44
2	Lafayette	77
7	Holy Cross	54
3	Lehigh	71
6	Colgate	64

Semifinals; March 9
1	Bucknell	78
4	Army	70
2	Lafayette	82
3	Lehigh	69

Championship; March 13; CBS Sports Network
1	Bucknell	64
2	Lafayette	56
