= 2012–13 American Eagles men's basketball team =

American college basketball season

2012–13 American Eagles men's basketball
- Conference: Patriot League
- Record: 10–20 (5–9 Patriot)
- Head coach: Jeff Jones (13th season)
- Assistant coaches: Kieran Donohue; Lamar Barrett; Eddie Jackson
- Home arena: Bender Arena

2012–13 Patriot League men's basketball standings
	Conf.				Overall
Team	W		L	PCT	W		L	PCT
Bucknell †	12	–	2	.857	28	–	6	.824
Lehigh	10	–	4	.714	21	–	10	.677
Lafayette	10	–	4	.714	19	–	15	.559
Army	8	–	6	.571	16	–	15	.516
American	5	–	9	.357	10	–	20	.333
Colgate	5	–	9	.357	11	–	21	.344
Holy Cross	4	–	10	.286	12	–	18	.400
Navy	2	–	12	.143	8	–	23	.258
† 2013 Patriot League tournament winner

The 2012–13 American Eagles men's basketball team represented American University during the 2012–13 NCAA Division I men's basketball season. The Eagles, led by 13th year head coach Jeff Jones, played their home games at Bender Arena and were members of the Patriot League. They finished the season 10–20, 5–9 in Patriot League play to finish in a tie for fifth place. They lost in the quarterfinals of the Patriot League tournament to Army.

== Roster ==
Number	Name	Position	Height	Weight	Year	Hometown
0	Darius Gardner	Guard	5–9	165	Junior	Houston, Texas
1	Kyle Kager	Forward	6–8	195	Sophomore	Flower Mound, Texas
2	Daniel Munoz	Guard	6–0	170	Senior	Plantation, Florida
4	Austin Carroll	Guard	6–3	210	Sophomore	Bedford, Massachusetts
5	Marko Vasic	Guard	6–5	200	Freshman	Belgrade, Serbia
10	Warren Flood, Jr.	Guard	6–2	205	Senior	Olney, Maryland
12	Daniel Fisher	Forward	6–7	235	Senior	Melbourne, Australia
14	Jesse Reed	Guard	6–5	185	Freshman	Saltsburg, Pennsylvania
20	Blake Jolivette	Guard	5–11	175	Senior	Houston, Texas
21	Billy Dooley	Guard	6–4	155	Freshman	Houston, Texas
22	John Schoof	Guard	6–5	205	Sophomore	Fairfax, Virginia
32	Stephen Lumpkins	Forward	6–8	230	Senior	Redwood City, California
33	Jordan Borucki	Guard	6–3	195	Senior	Los Angeles, California
34	Tony Wroblicky	Center	6–10	230	Junior	Harbor City, California
43	Mike Bersch	Forward	6–6	205	Senior	Mt. Holly, New Jersey
44	Zach Elcano	Center	6–11	230	Freshman	Centreville, Virginia

== Schedule ==
Date time, TV	Opponent	Result	Record	Site (attendance) city, state
Exhibition
10/31/2012*; 7:30 pm	Mary Washington	W 71–46		Bender Arena (871); Washington, D.C.
Regular season
11/09/2012*; 8:00 pm	at Minnesota	L 36–72	0–1	Williams Arena (10,172); Minneapolis, MN
11/12/2012*; 7:00 pm	at Quinnipiac	W 61–55	1–1	TD Bank Sports Center (1,822); Hamden, CT
11/15/2012*; 7:30 pm	Mount St. Mary's	W 62–57	2–1	Bender Arena (1,323); Washington, D.C.
11/19/2012*; 7:30 pm	San Francisco	L 53–67	2–2	Bender Arena; Washington, D.C.
11/24/2012*; 1:00 pm	at Florida Atlantic	L 55–56	2–3	FAU Arena (1,257); Boca Raton, FL
11/28/2012*; 7:00 pm	at Saint Joseph's	L 55–74	2–4	Hagan Arena (3,951); Philadelphia, PA
12/01/2012*; 2:00 pm	Saint Francis	W 61–51	3–4	Bender Arena (1,918); Washington, D.C.
12/04/2012*; 7:00 pm	at Howard	L 50–55	3–5	Burr Gymnasium (687); Washington, D.C.
12/06/2012*; 7:00 pm	at UMBC	W 73–70 ^{2OT}	4–5	Retriever Activities Center (1,305); Catonsville, MD
12/09/2012*; 2:00 pm	Columbia	L 42–54	4–6	Bender Arena (717); Washington, D.C.
12/18/2012*; 7:00 pm	at Hampton	L 65–72	4–7	Hampton Convocation Center (629); Hampton, VA
12/22/2012*; 12:00 pm, ESPN3	at No. 15 Georgetown	L 48–65	4–8	Verizon Center (9,867); Washington, D.C.
12/29/2012*; 8:00 pm, ESPN3	at No. 6 Kansas	L 57–89	4–9	Allen Fieldhouse (16,300); Lawrence, KS
01/03/2013*; 7:30 pm	Maryland–Eastern Shore	W 63–49	5–9	Bender Arena (376); Washington, D.C.
01/06/2013*; 2:00 pm	Cornell	L 60–68	5–10	Bender Arena (1,290); Washington, D.C.
01/12/2013; 2:00 pm	at Colgate	W 72–63	6–10 (1–0)	Cotterell Court (346); Hamilton, NY
01/16/2013; 7:30 pm	Lehigh	L 57–63	6–11 (1–1)	Bender Arena (1,029); Washington, D.C.
01/19/2013; 2:00 pm	at Holy Cross	L 60–79	6–12 (1–2)	Hart Center (2,583); Worcester, MA
01/23/2013; 7:00 pm	Navy	W 72–49	7–12 (2–2)	Bender Arena (919); Washington, D.C.
01/26/2013; 3:00 pm	at Army	L 64–77	7–13 (2–3)	Christl Arena (998); West Point, NY
01/30/2013; 7:30 pm	Bucknell	L 55–56	7–14 (2–4)	Bender Arena (1,428); Washington, D.C.
02/02/2013; 2:00 pm	Lafayette	W 68–64	8–14 (3–4)	Bender Arena (1,209); Washington, D.C.
02/09/2013; 3:00 pm	Colgate	W 70–55	9–14 (4–4)	Bender Arena (1,217); Washington, D.C.
02/13/2013; 7:00 pm	at Lehigh	L 47–60	9–15 (4–5)	Stabler Arena (1,119); Bethlehem, PA
02/17/2013; 12:00 pm, CBSSN	Holy Cross	W 64–61 ^{OT}	10–15 (5–5)	Bender Arena (1,637); Washington, D.C.
02/20/2013; 7:00 pm	at Navy	L 44–50	10–16 (5–6)	Alumni Hall (1,953); Annapolis, MD
02/23/2013; 2:00 pm	Army	L 58–72	10–17 (5–7)	Bender Arena (1,704); Washington, D.C.
02/27/2013; 7:00 pm	at Bucknell	L 47–66	10–18 (5–8)	Sojka Pavilion (3,084); Lewisburg, PA
03/02/2013; 12:00 pm	at Lafayette	L 72–80	10–19 (5–9)	Kirby Sports Center (3,033); Easton, PA
2013 Patriot League men's basketball tournament
03/06/2013; 7:00 pm	Army; Quarterfinals	L 44–65	10–20	Christl Arena (1,026); West Point, NY
*Non-conference game. ^{#}Rankings from AP Poll. (#) Tournament seedings in parentheses. All times are in Eastern Time.
