= 2012–13 Colgate Raiders men's basketball team =

American college basketball season

2012–13 Colgate Raiders men's basketball
- Conference: Patriot League
- Record: 11–21 (5–9 Patriot)
- Head coach: Matt Langel (2nd season)
- Assistant coaches: Dave Klatsky; Michael McGarvey; Michael-Hakim Jordan
- Home arena: Cotterell Court

2012–13 Patriot League men's basketball standings
	Conf.				Overall
Team	W		L	PCT	W		L	PCT
Bucknell †	12	–	2	.857	28	–	6	.824
Lehigh	10	–	4	.714	21	–	10	.677
Lafayette	10	–	4	.714	19	–	15	.559
Army	8	–	6	.571	16	–	15	.516
American	5	–	9	.357	10	–	20	.333
Colgate	5	–	9	.357	11	–	21	.344
Holy Cross	4	–	10	.286	12	–	18	.400
Navy	2	–	12	.143	8	–	23	.258
† 2013 Patriot League tournament winner

The 2012–13 Colgate Raiders men's basketball team represented Colgate University during the 2012–13 NCAA Division I men's basketball season. The Raiders, led by second year head coach Matt Langel, played their home games at Cotterell Court and were members of the Patriot League.

They finished the season 11–21, 5–9 in Patriot League play to finish in a tie for fifth place. They lost in the quarterfinals of the Patriot League tournament to Lehigh.

== Roster ==
Number	Name	Position	Height	Weight	Year	Hometown
0	Austin Tillotson	Guard	6–0	175	Sophomore	York, Pennsylvania
1	Ethan Jacobs	Center	6–11	235	Junior	Tipton, Indiana
2	Mitch Rolls	Guard	6–0	173	Senior	Coffeyville, Kansas
3	John Brandenburg	Center	6–11	263	Senior	St. Louis, Missouri
4	Luke Roh	Guard	6–4	195	Sophomore	Scottsdale, Arizona
5	Pat Moore	Guard	6–5	186	Junior	Whitesboro, New York
12	Alex Ramon	Guard	6–1	196	Freshman	Vitoria-Gasteiz, Spain
13	Murphy Burnatowski	Forward	6–7	230	Senior	Waterloo, Ontario, Canada
14	Chad Johnson	Guard	6–3	209	Junior	Atlanta, Georgia
15	Lazar Bogdanovic	Forward/Center	6–9	247	Senior	Leposavić, Serbia
21	Damon Sherman-Newsome	Guard	6–5	205	Freshman	Anchorage, Alaska
22	Brandon James	Forward	6–6	218	Senior	Poughkeepsie, New York
23	Clayton Graham	Forward	6–8	230	Junior	Old Greenwich, Connecticut
30	Jared Accettura	Guard	5–11	160	Senior	Morristown, New Jersey
32	Matt McMullen	Forward	6–6	220	Sophomore	Brick Township, New Jersey

== Schedule ==
Date time, TV	Opponent	Result	Record	Site (attendance) city, state
Regular season
11/09/2012*; 8:00 pm, BTN.com	at Illinois; Maui Invitational tournament	L 55–75	0–1	Assembly Hall (14,683); Champaign, IL
11/11/2012*; 4:30 pm, ESPNU	at Marquette; Maui Invitational Tournament	L 63–84	0–2	BMO Harris Bradley Center (13,065); Milwaukee, WI
11/14/2012*; 7:00 pm	Marist	W 74–60	1–2	Cotterell Court (422); Hamilton, NY
11/17/2012*; 2:00 pm	at Elon; Maui Invitational Tournament	L 72–81	1–3	Alumni Gym (1,107); Elon, NC
11/18/2012*; 2:00 pm	vs. Coppin State; Maui Invitational Tournament	W 88–84	2–3	Alumni Gym (908); Elon, NC
11/21/2012*; 5:00 pm	at Saint Francis (PA)	W 85–76	3–3	DeGol Arena (652); Loretto, PA
11/25/2012*; 1:00 pm	at No. 6 Syracuse	L 51–87	3–4	Carrier Dome (21,085); Syracuse, NY
12/01/2012*; 7:00 pm	at Cornell	L 63–70	3–5	Newman Arena (1,864); Ithaca, NY
12/05/2012*; 7:00 pm	at Quinnipiac	L 56–67	3–6	TD Bank Sports Center (1,202); Hamden, CT
12/08/2012*; 2:00 pm	Albany	L 61–67	3–7	Cotterell Court (N/A); Hamilton, NY
12/18/2012*; 7:00 pm	at Providence	L 45–79	3–8	Dunkin' Donuts Center (6,033); Providence, RI
12/22/2012*; 2:00 pm	at St. Francis Brooklyn	L 61–73	3–9	Generoso Pope Athletic Complex (607); Brooklyn, NY
12/28/2012*; 7:00 pm	Binghamton	W 74–47	4–9	Cotterell Court (N/A); Hamilton, NY
12/30/2012*; 2:00 pm	New Hampshire	W 65–63	5–9	Cotterell Court (237); Hamilton, NY
01/02/2013*; 7:00 pm	at Columbia	L 59–66	5–10	Levien Gymnasium (881); New York City, NY
01/05/2013*; 7:00 pm	at Dartmouth	W 78–62	6–10	Leede Arena (827); Hanover, NH
01/12/2013; 2:00 pm	American	L 63–72	6–11 (0–1)	Cotterell Court (346); Hamilton, NY
01/16/2013; 7:00 pm	Bucknell	L 59–73	6–12 (0–2)	Cotterell Court (612); Hamilton, NY
01/19/2013; 7:00 pm	at Lehigh	L 45–60	6–13 (0–3)	Stabler Arena (2,709); Bethlehem, PA
01/23/2013; 7:00 pm	Army	W 93–90 ^{OT}	7–13 (1–3)	Cotterell Court (432); Hamilton, NY
01/26/2013; 7:00 pm	at Navy	W 70–56	8–13 (2–3)	Alumni Hall (2,351); Annapolis, MD
01/30/2013; 7:00 pm	at Lafayette	L 40–69	8–14 (2–4)	Kirby Sports Center (2,470); Easton, PA
02/02/2013; 2:00 pm	Holy Cross	W 63–45	9–14 (3–4)	Cotterell Court (322); Hamilton, NY
02/06/2013*; 7:00 pm	NJIT	L 58–77	9–15	Cotterell Court (276); Hamilton, NY
02/09/2013; 3:00 pm	at American	L 55–70	9–16 (3–5)	Bender Arena (1,217); Washington, D.C.
02/13/2013; 7:00 pm	at Bucknell	L 61–69	9–17 (3–6)	Sojka Pavilion (2,956); Lewisburg, PA
02/16/2013; 2:00 pm	Lehigh	W 64–60	10–17 (4–6)	Cotterell Court (1,064); Hamilton, NY
02/20/2013; 7:00 pm	at Army	L 63–77	10–18 (4–7)	Christl Arena (769); West Point, NY
02/24/2013; 12:00 pm	Navy	W 59–46	11–18 (5–7)	Cotterell Court (542); Hamilton, NY
02/27/2013; 7:00 pm	Lafayette	L 67–80	11–19 (5–8)	Cotterell Court (572); Hamilton, NY
03/02/2013; 12:00 pm	at Holy Cross	L 59–74	11–20 (5–9)	Hart Center (1,114); Worcester, MA
2013 Patriot League men's basketball tournament
03/06/2013; 7:00 pm	at Lehigh; Quarterfinals	L 64–71	11–21	Stabler Arena (1,364); Bethlehem, PA
*Non-conference game. ^{#}Rankings from AP Poll. (#) Tournament seedings in parentheses. All times are in Eastern Time.
