= 2012–13 Holy Cross Crusaders men's basketball team =

American college basketball season

2012–13 Holy Cross Crusaders men's basketball
- Conference: Patriot League
- Record: 12–18 (4–10 Patriot)
- Head coach: Milan Brown (3rd season)
- Assistant coaches: Brion Dunlap; Kevin Robinson; Dan Engelstad
- Home arena: Hart Center

2012–13 Patriot League men's basketball standings
	Conf.				Overall
Team	W		L	PCT	W		L	PCT
Bucknell †	12	–	2	.857	28	–	6	.824
Lehigh	10	–	4	.714	21	–	10	.677
Lafayette	10	–	4	.714	19	–	15	.559
Army	8	–	6	.571	16	–	15	.516
American	5	–	9	.357	10	–	20	.333
Colgate	5	–	9	.357	11	–	21	.344
Holy Cross	4	–	10	.286	12	–	18	.400
Navy	2	–	12	.143	8	–	23	.258
† 2013 Patriot League tournament winner

The 2012–13 Holy Cross Crusaders men's basketball team represented the College of the Holy Cross during the 2012–13 NCAA Division I men's basketball season. The Crusaders, led by third year head coach Milan Brown, played their home games at the Hart Center and were members of the Patriot League. They finished the season 12–18, 4–10 in Patriot League play to finish in seventh place. They lost in the quarterfinals of the Patriot League tournament to Lafayette.

== Roster ==
Number	Name	Position	Height	Weight	Year	Hometown
1	Dee Goens	Guard	6–0	180	Senior	Alpharetta, Georgia
3	Justin Burrell	Guard	5–9	165	Sophomore	Dumfries, Virginia
4	Chris Jayne	Guard	5–11	160	Sophomore	Newburyport, Massachusetts
5	Cullen Hamilton	Guard	6–3	185	Freshman	Washington, D.C.
12	Christopher Morgan	Forward	6–7	215	Freshman	Gloucester Courthouse, Virginia
13	Malcolm Miller	Forward	6–6	190	Sophomore	Gaithersburg, Maryland
15	Reid De'Vaughn	Guard	6–0	165	Sophomore	West Orange, New Jersey
24	Eric Green	Guard/Forward	6–4	180	Freshman	Mountain House, California
25	Isaiah Baker	Forward	6–8	240	Freshman	Wyncote, Pennsylvania
32	Jordan Stevens	Guard	6–5	200	Senior	Gansevoort, New York
35	Eric Obeysekere	Forward	6–8	209	Senior	Orinda, California
40	Patrick Kerrigan	Forward	6–6	215	Sophomore	Fairfield, Connecticut
43	Taylor Abt	Forward	6–8	225	Sophomore	Darnestown, Maryland
44	Phil Beans	Center	6–9	233	Senior	Toledo, Ohio
50	Dave Dudzinski	Forward	6–9	227	Junior	Elburn, Illinois

== Schedule ==
Date time, TV	Opponent	Result	Record	Site (attendance) city, state
Exhibition
11/04/2012*; 4:00 pm	Assumption	L 63–71		Hart Center (452); Worcester, MA
Regular season
11/09/2012*; 7:15 pm	at Old Dominion; Liberty Tax Classic	W 46–45	1–0	Ted Constant Convocation Center (7,283); Norfolk, VA
11/10/2012*; 5:00 pm	vs. UTSA; Liberty Tax Classic	L 56–60	1–1	Ted Constant Convocation Center (6,993); Norfolk, VA
11/11/2012*; 4:15 pm	vs. Morgan State; Liberty Tax Classic	W 74–73	2–1	Ted Constant Convocation Center (6,233); Norfolk, VA
11/14/2012*; 7:00 pm	Maine	W 57–54	3–1	Hart Center (1,327); Worcester, MA
11/21/2012*; 7:30 pm, SNY	at St. John's	L 53–65	3–2	Carnesecca Arena (4,030); Queens, NY
11/24/2012*; 4:00 pm	New Hampshire	W 60–50	4–2	Hart Center (N/A); Worcester, MA
11/27/2012*; 7:00 pm, COX	at Providence	L 42–61	4–3	Dunkin' Donuts Center (4,596); Providence, RI
12/01/2012*; 7:00 pm	at Hartford	L 45–48	4–4	Chase Arena at Reich Family Pavilion (1,620); Hartford, CT
12/05/2012*; 7:00 pm	at Sacred Heart	W 83–78	5–4	William H. Pitt Center (664); Fairfield, CT
12/08/2012*; 4:00 pm	Dartmouth	W 67–56	6–4	Hart Center (1,774); Worcester, MA
12/18/2012*; 10:00 pm	at San Francisco	W 73–63	7–4	War Memorial Gymnasium (1,394); San Francisco, CA
12/22/2012*; 2:00 pm	at Harvard	L 65–72	7–5	Lavietes Pavilion (1,851); Boston, MA
12/29/2012*; 2:00 pm, ESPN3	at Boston College	L 60–70	7–6	Conte Forum (5,442); Chestnut Hill, MA
01/04/2013*; 7:00 pm	Yale	L 54–61	7–7	Hart Center (1,474); Worcester, MA
01/08/2013*; 7:00 pm	Columbia	W 78–69	8–7	Hart Center (1,011); Worcester, MA
01/12/2013; 2:00 pm, CBSSN	at Lehigh	L 47–79	8–8 (0–1)	Stabler Arena (2,172); Bethlehem, PA
01/16/2013; 7:00 pm	at Navy	W 62–47	9–8 (1–1)	Alumni Hall (1,647); Annapolis, MD
01/19/2013; 2:00 pm	American	W 79–60	10–8 (2–1)	Hart Center (2,583); Worcester, MA
01/23/2013; 7:00 pm, Lafayette Sports Network	at Lafayette	L 53–63	10–9 (2–2)	Kirby Sports Center (1,679); Easton, PA
01/26/2013; 4:00 pm, CBSSN	Bucknell	L 58–65	10–10 (2–3)	Hart Center (3,229); Worcester, MA
01/30/2013; 7:00 pm, Charter TV3	Army	L 66–80	10–11 (2–4)	Hart Center (1,296); Worcester, MA
02/02/2013; 2:00 pm	at Colgate	L 45–63	10–12 (2–5)	Cotterell Court (322); Hamilton, NY
02/09/2013; 7:00 pm	Lehigh	L 61–68	10–13 (2–6)	Hart Center (812); Worcester, MA
02/12/2013; 7:00 pm	Navy	W 66–57	11–13 (3–6)	Hart Center (803); Worcester, MA
02/17/2013; 12:00 pm, CBSSN	at American	L 61–64 ^{OT}	11–14 (3–7)	Bender Arena (1,637); Washington, D.C.
02/20/2013; 7:00 pm	Lafayette	L 76–79	11–15 (3–8)	Hart Center (1,238); Worcester, MA
02/24/2013; 12:00 pm	at Bucknell	L 57–74	11–16 (3–9)	Sojka Pavilion (3,497); Lewisburg, PA
02/27/2013; 7:00 pm	at Army	L 62–69	11–17 (3–10)	Christl Arena (788); West Point, NY
03/02/2013; 12:00 pm	Colgate	W 74–59	12–17 (4–10)	Hart Center (1,114); Worcester, MA
2013 Patriot League men's basketball tournament
03/06/2013; 7:00 pm	at Lafayette; Quarterfinals	L 54–77	12–18	Kirby Sports Center (1,903); Easton, PA
*Non-conference game. ^{#}Rankings from AP Poll. (#) Tournament seedings in parentheses. All times are in Eastern Time.
