= 2012–13 NCAA Division I men's basketball season =

Basketball season

- Preseason AP No. 1: Indiana Hoosiers
- Regular season: November 9, 2012 – March 17, 2013
- NCAA Tournament: 2013
- Tournament dates: March 19 – April 8, 2013
- National Championship: Georgia Dome; Atlanta, Georgia
- NCAA Champions: Louisville Cardinals (vacated)
- Other champions: Baylor Bears (NIT), Santa Clara Broncos (CBI), East Carolina Pirates (CIT)
- Player of the Year (Naismith, Wooden): Trey Burke, Michigan Wolverines

The 2012–13 NCAA Division I men's basketball season began in November 2012 with the 2K Sports Classic and ended with the 2013 NCAA Division I men's basketball tournament Final Four on April 6, 2013 and national championship game on April 8, 2013, both held at the Georgia Dome in Atlanta, Georgia.

== Season headlines ==
- October 29 – The AP preseason All-American team was named. Indiana's Cody Zeller was the leading vote-getter, garnering 64 of 65 possible votes. Joining Zeller were Creighton forward Doug McDermott (62 votes), Murray State guard Isaiah Canaan (43), Ohio State forward Deshaun Thomas (26), Michigan guard Trey Burke (16) and Lehigh guard CJ McCollum (16). Burke and McCollum tied in the voting, creating a sixth spot on the team.
- December 1 – Respected Saint Louis coach Rick Majerus died at 64 of heart failure. Majerus had been placed on a medical leave of absence prior to the start of the season for medical reasons and was replaced on an interim basis by Jim Crews. Majerus had a record of 517–216 in his 25 years as a head coach, with stops at Marquette, Ball State and Utah prior to taking the job at SLU. His best finish came in 1998 when he led Utah to the NCAA championship game.
- December 15 – The seven Big East Conference schools that do not sponsor FBS football (DePaul, Georgetown, St. John's, Providence, Villanova, Seton Hall and Marquette, collectively called the "Catholic 7") announced that they would break from the Big East and pursue other conference affiliation. The move leaves Connecticut as the only original Big East member set to remain in the conference.
- February 28 – ESPN reports that the "Catholic 7" will launch their new conference in July 2013, two years ahead of schedule, and will purchase the rights to the "Big East" name from the remaining conference schools. Two Atlantic 10 Conference members, Butler (which had only joined the A10 in July 2012) and Xavier, will reportedly join the new Big East, with Missouri Valley Conference member Creighton also a possibility.
- March 8 – The Big East split is officially announced. As previously reported, the "Catholic 7" will leave on June 30 with the Big East name. As of the announcement, the "Catholic 7" were the only members of the new Big East, but Butler, Xavier, and Creighton are expected to be added shortly.
- March 12 – Virginia Tech's Erick Green wins the ACC Player of the Year award, joining Maryland's Len Bias (1985–86) as the only two players of the year who competed for teams with losing ACC records.
- March 20 – The new Big East is officially launched at a press conference in New York City, with Butler, Creighton, and Xavier joining the "Catholic 7".
- April 3 – The FBS schools that will retain the charter of the original Big East unveil their future name, the American Athletic Conference, marketed as "The American."
- The Great West Conference disbanded at the end of the season after four seasons of competition.

=== Milestones and records ===
- November 25 – Lehigh's CJ McCollum scored 26 points in a 91–77 win over Sacred Heart, which made him surpass Rob Feaster as the Patriot League's all-time leading scorer.
- December 8 – Junior center Jordan Bachynski recorded the first triple-double in Arizona State men's basketball history. The 7'2" Bachynski scored 13 points, grabbed 12 rebounds and blocked 12 shots in an 87–76 win over Cal State Northridge.
- December 17 – Syracuse head coach Jim Boeheim became the third Division I head coach to win 900 games as the Orange defeated Detroit 72–68.
- December 19 – Phil Pressey recorded 19 assists for Missouri against UCLA tying the Southeastern Conference single-game assist record (Kenny Higgs, 1976–77 LSU; Bill Hann, 1967–68 Tennessee).
- January 2 – VCU senior guard Troy Daniels set a school and Atlantic 10 Conference record by hitting 11 three-pointers in a 109–58 win over East Tennessee State. Daniels scored all 33 of his points in the game on three-point shots.
- Santa Clara guard Kevin Foster, South Dakota State guard Nate Wolters, Evansville guard Colt Ryan, Georgia Southern guard C. J. Reed, Creighton forward Doug McDermott, VMI forward Stan Okoye, Sacred Heart guard Shane Gibson, Ohio guard D. J. Cooper, Murray State guard Isaiah Canaan, Duke guard Seth Curry, Bucknell center Mike Muscala and Florida guard Kenny Boynton each passed the 2,000 point mark for their careers.
- January 26 – Northern Illinois set several all-time Division I marks of offensive futility in a 42–25 loss to Eastern Michigan: fewest points in a half in the shot clock era (4), lowest field goal shooting percentage for a half (3.2%), and tied the record for fewest field goals made in a half (1). The Huskies shot 1-for-31 in the first half, including 29 straight misses.
- February 25 – Kansas head coach Bill Self records his 500th win with a 108–96 overtime win at Iowa State.
- March 5 – D. J. Cooper of Ohio becomes the first player in the history of college basketball to record 2,000 points, 900 assists, 600 rebounds and 300 steals in a career.
- March 13 – Grambling State loses 59–51 to Alabama A&M in the SWAC tournament, finishing off their winless 0–28 season.

== Conference membership changes ==
The 2012–13 season saw the second wave of membership changes resulting from a major realignment of NCAA Division I conferences. The cycle began in 2010 with the Big Ten and the then-Pac-10 publicly announcing their intentions to expand. The fallout from these conferences' moves later affected a majority of D-I conferences.

In addition, one school moved from Division II starting this season. This school was ineligible for NCAA-sponsored postseason play until completing its D-I transition in 2016. Finally, one school that had announced a transition to Division II, New Orleans, announced that it would halt its transition and remain in Division I.

| School | Former conference | New conference |
|---|---|---|
| Belmont Bruins | A-Sun | OVC |
| Butler Bulldogs | Horizon League | Atlantic 10 |
| Denver Pioneers | Sun Belt | WAC |
| Fresno State Bulldogs | WAC | Mountain West |
| Hawaiʻi Rainbow Warriors | WAC | Big West |
| Longwood Lancers | Independent | Big South |
| Missouri Tigers | Big 12 | SEC |
| Nevada Wolf Pack | WAC | Mountain West |
| New Orleans Privateers | Division II independent | Division I independent |
| North Dakota (no nickname) | Great West | Big Sky |
| Northern Kentucky Norse | GLVC (D-II) | A-Sun |
| Omaha Mavericks | Independent | Summit League |
| Oral Roberts Golden Eagles | Summit League | Southland |
| Seattle Redhawks | Independent | WAC |
| Southern Utah Thunderbirds | Summit League | Big Sky |
| TCU Horned Frogs | Mountain West | Big 12 |
| Texas A&M Aggies | Big 12 | SEC |
| Texas State Bobcats | Southland | WAC |
| UT Arlington Mavericks | Southland | WAC |
| UTSA Roadrunners | Southland | WAC |
| VCU Rams | CAA | Atlantic 10 |
| West Virginia Mountaineers | Big East | Big 12 |

== New arenas ==
- Coastal Carolina left behind one of the smallest venues in Division I basketball, Kimbel Arena (seating a little over 1,000). The Chanticleers remained on campus at the new HTC Center.
- Troy left its on-campus home since 1962, the original Trojan Arena, for a new on-campus venue also named Trojan Arena.

== Major rule changes ==
Beginning in 2012–13, the following rules changes were implemented:

- College coaches are allowed to practice with players a maximum two hours per week during the Summer (May–August) as long as the student-athletes were enrolled in classes.
- Coaches could work their teams for a maximum of two hours a week beginning September 15 until official practice begins on October 13.
- There is now unlimited contact, including text messaging, allowed between college coaches and a prospective player in high school and junior college recruiting.

== Season outlook ==
=== Pre-season polls ===
The top 25 from the AP and ESPN/USA Today Coaches Polls.

'Associated Press'
| Ranking | Team |
|---|---|
| 1 | Indiana (43) |
| 2 | Louisville (20) |
| 3 | Kentucky (2) |
| 4 | Ohio State |
| 5 | Michigan |
| 6 | NC State |
| 7 | Kansas |
| 8 | Duke |
| 9 | Syracuse |
| 10 | Florida |
| 11 | North Carolina |
| 12 | Arizona |
| 13 | UCLA |
| 14 | Michigan State |
| 15 | Missouri |
| 16 | Creighton |
| 17 | Memphis |
| 18 | UNLV |
| 19 | Baylor |
| 20 | San Diego State |
| 21 | Gonzaga |
| 22 | Notre Dame |
| 23 | Wisconsin |
| 24 | Cincinnati |
| 25 | Florida State |

ESPN/USA Today Coaches
| Ranking | Team |
|---|---|
| 1 | Indiana (31) |
| 2 | Louisville (5) |
| 3 | Kentucky (5) |
| 4 | Ohio State |
| 5 | Michigan |
| 6 | NC State |
| 7 | Kansas |
| 8 | Duke |
| 9 | Syracuse |
| 10 | Florida |
| 11 | Arizona |
| 12 | North Carolina |
| 13 | UCLA |
| 14 | Michigan State |
| 15 | Creighton |
| 16 | Memphis |
| 17 | Missouri |
| 18 | Baylor |
| 19 | UNLV |
| 20 | San Diego State |
| 21 | Wisconsin |
| 22 | Gonzaga |
| 23 | Notre Dame |
| 24 | Florida Stateт; Texasт |

== Regular season ==
A number of early-season tournaments marked the beginning of the college basketball season.

=== Early-season tournaments ===
| Name | Dates | No. teams | Champion |
|---|---|---|---|
| NIT Season Tip-Off | November 12–13, 21, 23 | 16 | Michigan |
| 2K Sports Classic^ | November 15–16 | 4* | Alabama |
| Champions Classic | November 13 | 4 | N/A |
| Puerto Rico Tip-Off | November 15–16, 18 | 8 | Oklahoma State |
| Charleston Classic | November 2012 | 8 | Colorado |
| Coaches vs. Cancer Classic^ | November 15–16 | 4* | Florida State |
| Hall of Fame Tip Off | November 16–18 | 4 | Ohio State |
| Paradise Jam tournament | November 16–19 | 8 | New Mexico |
| CBE Hall of Fame Classic | November 19–20 | 4* | Kansas |
| Legends Classic | November 19–20 | 4* | Indiana |
| Maui Invitational tournament | November 19–21 | 8 | Illinois |
| Cancún Challenge | November 20–21 | 8 | Wichita State |
| Great Alaska Shootout | November 21–24 | 8 | Charlotte |
| Battle 4 Atlantis | November 22–24 | 8 | Duke |
| Old Spice Classic | November 22–23,25 | 8 | Gonzaga |
| Anaheim Classic | November 22–23,25 | 8 | California |
| Las Vegas Invitational | November 23, 24 | 4* | Creighton |
| South Padre Island Invitational | November 23, 24 | 8 | Northwestern |
| Hoops for Hope Classic | November 23, 25 | 4* | South Carolina |
| Las Vegas Classic | December 22–23 | 4* | Colorado State |
| Diamond Head Classic | December 22–23, 25 | 8 | Arizona |

^The former Coaches vs. Cancer Classic was renamed the 2K Sports Classic in 2012 due to a sponsorship change, and a new tournament named the Coaches vs. Cancer Classic began play in 2012.
*Although these tournaments included more teams, only the number listed played for the championship.

=== Conferences ===
==== Conference winners and tournaments ====
Thirty-one conference seasons concluded with a single-elimination tournament. The teams in each conference that won their regular-season titles were given the number one seed in their respective conference tournaments. Conference tournament winners received an automatic bid to the 2013 NCAA Division I men's basketball tournament except for the winner of the Great West Conference tournament, although its champion received an automatic bid to the 2013 CollegeInsider.com Tournament. The Ivy League was the only NCAA Division I conference that did not hold a conference tournament, instead sending its regular-season champion to the NCAA tournament.

| Conference | Regular season winner | Conference Player of the Year | Conference Coach of the Year | Conference tournament | Tournament venue (city) | Tournament winner |
|---|---|---|---|---|---|---|
| America East Conference | Stony Brook | Tommy Brenton, Stony Brook | Steve Pikiell, Stony Brook | 2013 America East men's basketball tournament | SEFCU Arena (Guilderland, New York); Final at campus site | Albany |
| Atlantic 10 Conference | Saint Louis | Khalif Wyatt, Temple | Jim Crews, Saint Louis | 2013 Atlantic 10 men's basketball tournament | Barclays Center (Brooklyn, New York) | Saint Louis |
| Atlantic Coast Conference | Miami | Erick Green, Virginia Tech (media) & Shane Larkin, Miami (coaches) | Jim Larranaga, Miami | 2013 ACC men's basketball tournament | Greensboro Coliseum (Greensboro, North Carolina) | Miami |
| Atlantic Sun Conference | Mercer | Sherwood Brown, Florida Gulf Coast | Bob Hoffman, Mercer | 2013 Atlantic Sun men's basketball tournament | University Center (Macon, Georgia) | Florida Gulf Coast |
| Big 12 Conference | Kansas & Kansas State | Marcus Smart, Oklahoma State | Bruce Weber, Kansas State | 2013 Big 12 men's basketball tournament | Sprint Center (Kansas City, Missouri) | Kansas |
| Big East Conference | Georgetown, Louisville & Marquette | Otto Porter, Georgetown | John Thompson III, Georgetown | 2013 Big East men's basketball tournament | Madison Square Garden (New York City) | Louisville |
| Big Sky Conference | Montana | Kareem Jamar, Montana | Wayne Tinkle, Montana | 2013 Big Sky Conference men's basketball tournament | At regular season champion | Montana |
| Big South Conference | High Point (Division A); Charleston Southern (Division B) | Stan Okoye, VMI | Chris Holtmann, Gardner–Webb | 2013 Big South Conference men's basketball tournament | HTC Center (Conway, South Carolina) | Liberty |
| Big Ten Conference | Indiana | Trey Burke, Michigan | Bo Ryan, Wisconsin | 2013 Big Ten Conference men's basketball tournament | United Center (Chicago) | Ohio State |
| Big West Conference | Long Beach State | James Ennis, Long Beach State | Dan Monson, Long Beach State | 2013 Big West Conference men's basketball tournament | Honda Center (Anaheim, California) | Pacific |
| Colonial Athletic Association | Northeastern | Jerrelle Benimon, Towson | Pat Skerry, Towson | 2013 CAA men's basketball tournament | Richmond Coliseum (Richmond, Virginia) | James Madison |
| Conference USA | Memphis | Joe Jackson, Memphis | Josh Pastner, Memphis | 2013 Conference USA men's basketball tournament | BOK Center (Tulsa, Oklahoma) | Memphis |
| Great West Conference | NJIT | Chris Flores, NJIT | Jim Engles, NJIT | 2013 Great West Conference men's basketball tournament | Emil and Patricia Jones Convocation Center; Chicago | Chicago State |
| Horizon League | Valparaiso | Ray McCallum, Jr., Detroit | Billy Donlon, Wright State | 2013 Horizon League men's basketball tournament | First round at campus sites Quarterfinals and semifinals at top seed Final at top remaining seed | Valparaiso |
| Ivy League | Harvard | Ian Hummer, Princeton | | No tournament | | |
| Metro Atlantic Athletic Conference | Niagara | Lamont Jones, Iona | Joe Mihalich, Niagara | 2013 MAAC men's basketball tournament | MassMutual Center (Springfield, Massachusetts) | Iona |
| Mid-American Conference | Akron (East); Western Michigan (West) | D. J. Cooper, Ohio | Keith Dambrot, Akron | 2013 Mid-American Conference men's basketball tournament | First round at campus sites Remainder at Quicken Loans Arena (Cleveland, Ohio) | Akron |
| Mid-Eastern Athletic Conference | Norfolk State | Pendarvis Williams, Norfolk State | Anthony Evans, Norfolk State | 2013 MEAC men's basketball tournament | Norfolk Scope (Norfolk, Virginia) | North Carolina A&T |
| Missouri Valley Conference | Creighton | Doug McDermott, Creighton | Gregg Marshall, Wichita State | 2013 Missouri Valley Conference men's basketball tournament | Scottrade Center (St. Louis, Missouri) | Creighton |
| Mountain West Conference | New Mexico | Kendall Williams, New Mexico | Steve Alford, New Mexico | 2013 Mountain West Conference men's basketball tournament | Thomas & Mack Center (Paradise, Nevada) | New Mexico |
| Northeast Conference | Robert Morris | Jamal Olasewere, Long Island | Tim O'Shea, Bryant | 2013 Northeast Conference men's basketball tournament | Campus Sites | Long Island |
| Ohio Valley Conference | Belmont (East); Murray State (West) | Isaiah Canaan, Murray State & Ian Clark, Belmont | Rick Byrd, Belmont | 2013 Ohio Valley Conference men's basketball tournament | Nashville Municipal Auditorium (Nashville, Tennessee) | Belmont |
| Pac-12 Conference | UCLA | Allen Crabbe, California | Dana Altman, Oregon | 2013 Pac-12 Conference men's basketball tournament | MGM Grand Garden Arena (Paradise, Nevada) | Oregon |
| Patriot League | Bucknell | Mike Muscala, Bucknell | Zach Spiker, Army | 2013 Patriot League men's basketball tournament | Campus Sites | Bucknell |
| Southeastern Conference | Florida | Kentavious Caldwell-Pope, Georgia | Billy Donovan, Florida | 2013 SEC men's basketball tournament | Bridgestone Arena (Nashville, Tennessee) | Ole Miss |
| Southern Conference | Elon (North); Davidson (South) | Jake Cohen, Davidson | Bob McKillop, Davidson (coaches); Matt Matheny, Elon (media) | 2013 Southern Conference men's basketball tournament | U.S. Cellular Center (Asheville, North Carolina) | Davidson |
| Southland Conference | Stephen F. Austin | Taylor Smith, Stephen F. Austin | Danny Kaspar, Stephen F. Austin | 2013 Southland Conference men's basketball tournament | Leonard E. Merrell Center (Katy, Texas) | Northwestern State |
| Southwestern Athletic Conference | Southern | Omar Strong, Texas Southern | Mike Davis, Texas Southern & Roman Banks, Southern | 2013 SWAC men's basketball tournament | Garland Special Events Center (Garland, Texas) | Southern |
| The Summit League | South Dakota State & Western Illinois | Nate Wolters, South Dakota State | Jim Molinari, Western Illinois | 2013 The Summit League men's basketball tournament | Sioux Falls Arena (Sioux Falls, South Dakota) | South Dakota State |
| Sun Belt Conference | Middle Tennessee (East); Arkansas State (West) | Augustine Rubit, South Alabama | Kermit Davis, Middle Tennessee | 2013 Sun Belt Conference men's basketball tournament | Summit Arena (Hot Springs, Arkansas) | Western Kentucky |
| West Coast Conference | Gonzaga | Kelly Olynyk, Gonzaga | Mark Few, Gonzaga | 2013 West Coast Conference men's basketball tournament | Orleans Arena (Paradise, Nevada) | Gonzaga |
| Western Athletic Conference | Louisiana Tech & Denver | Kyle Barone, Idaho | Michael White, Louisiana Tech | 2013 WAC men's basketball tournament | Orleans Arena (Paradise, Nevada) | New Mexico State |

==== Conference standings ====
2012–13 America East men's basketball standings
| | Conf. | | | | Overall |
| Team | W | | L | PCT | W | | L | PCT |
|---|---|---|---|---|---|---|---|---|
| Stony Brook | 14 | – | 2 | .875 | 25 | – | 8 | .758 |
| Vermont | 11 | – | 5 | .688 | 21 | – | 12 | .636 |
| Boston University* | 11 | – | 5 | .688 | 17 | – | 13 | .567 |
| Hartford | 10 | – | 6 | .625 | 17 | – | 14 | .548 |
| Albany † | 9 | – | 7 | .563 | 24 | – | 11 | .686 |
| Maine | 6 | – | 10 | .375 | 11 | – | 19 | .367 |
| New Hampshire | 5 | – | 11 | .313 | 9 | – | 20 | .310 |
| UMBC | 5 | – | 11 | .313 | 8 | – | 23 | .258 |
| Binghamton | 1 | – | 15 | .063 | 3 | – | 27 | .100 |
† 2013 America East tournament winner As of March 22, 2013; Rankings from AP Poll; *Ineligible for conference tournament due to changing conferences in 2013

2012–13 Atlantic 10 men's basketball standings
| | Conf. | | | | Overall |
| Team | W | | L | PCT | W | | L | PCT |
|---|---|---|---|---|---|---|---|---|
| No. 16 Saint Louis † | 13 | – | 3 | .813 | 28 | – | 7 | .800 |
| No. 25 VCU | 12 | – | 4 | .750 | 27 | – | 9 | .750 |
| Butler | 11 | – | 5 | .688 | 27 | – | 9 | .750 |
| La Salle | 11 | – | 5 | .688 | 24 | – | 10 | .706 |
| Temple | 11 | – | 5 | .688 | 24 | – | 10 | .706 |
| UMass | 9 | – | 7 | .563 | 21 | – | 12 | .636 |
| Xavier | 9 | – | 7 | .563 | 17 | – | 14 | .548 |
| Charlotte | 8 | – | 8 | .500 | 21 | – | 12 | .636 |
| Saint Joseph's | 8 | – | 8 | .500 | 18 | – | 14 | .563 |
| Richmond | 8 | – | 8 | .500 | 19 | – | 15 | .559 |
| Dayton | 7 | – | 9 | .438 | 17 | – | 14 | .548 |
| St. Bonaventure | 7 | – | 9 | .438 | 14 | – | 15 | .483 |
| George Washington | 7 | – | 9 | .438 | 13 | – | 17 | .433 |
| Rhode Island | 3 | – | 13 | .188 | 8 | – | 21 | .276 |
| Fordham | 3 | – | 13 | .188 | 7 | – | 24 | .226 |
| Duquesne | 1 | – | 15 | .063 | 8 | – | 22 | .267 |
† 2013 Atlantic 10 Tournament winner As of March 28, 2013; Rankings from AP Poll

2012–13 ACC men's basketball standings
| | Conf. | | | | Overall |
| Team | W | | L | PCT | W | | L | PCT |
|---|---|---|---|---|---|---|---|---|
| No. 5 Miami (FL) † | 15 | – | 3 | .833 | 29 | – | 7 | .806 |
| No. 6 Duke | 14 | – | 4 | .778 | 30 | – | 6 | .833 |
| North Carolina | 12 | – | 6 | .667 | 25 | – | 11 | .694 |
| Virginia | 11 | – | 7 | .611 | 23 | – | 12 | .657 |
| NC State | 11 | – | 7 | .611 | 24 | – | 11 | .686 |
| Florida State | 9 | – | 9 | .500 | 18 | – | 16 | .529 |
| Maryland | 8 | – | 10 | .444 | 25 | – | 13 | .658 |
| Boston College | 7 | – | 11 | .389 | 16 | – | 17 | .485 |
| Georgia Tech | 6 | – | 12 | .333 | 16 | – | 15 | .516 |
| Wake Forest | 6 | – | 12 | .333 | 13 | – | 18 | .419 |
| Clemson | 5 | – | 13 | .278 | 13 | – | 18 | .419 |
| Virginia Tech | 4 | – | 14 | .222 | 13 | – | 19 | .406 |
† 2013 ACC tournament winner As of April 2, 2013; Rankings from AP Poll

2012–13 Atlantic Sun men's basketball standings
| | Conf. | | | | Overall |
| Team | W | | L | PCT | W | | L | PCT |
|---|---|---|---|---|---|---|---|---|
| Mercer | 14 | – | 4 | .778 | 24 | – | 12 | .667 |
| Florida Gulf Coast † | 13 | – | 5 | .722 | 26 | – | 11 | .703 |
| Stetson | 11 | – | 7 | .611 | 15 | – | 16 | .484 |
| USC Upstate | 9 | – | 9 | .500 | 16 | – | 17 | .485 |
| Jacksonville | 9 | – | 9 | .500 | 14 | – | 18 | .438 |
| Northern Kentucky* | 9 | – | 9 | .500 | 11 | – | 16 | .407 |
| North Florida | 8 | – | 10 | .444 | 13 | – | 19 | .406 |
| East Tennessee State | 8 | – | 10 | .444 | 10 | – | 22 | .313 |
| Lipscomb | 7 | – | 11 | .389 | 12 | – | 18 | .400 |
| Kennesaw State | 2 | – | 16 | .111 | 3 | – | 27 | .100 |
† 2013 Atlantic Sun Tournament winner As of March 29, 2013; Rankings from AP Poll *ineligible for postseason play due to Div. I transition

2012–13 Big East men's basketball standings
| | Conf. | | | | Overall |
| Team | W | | L | PCT | W | | L | PCT |
|---|---|---|---|---|---|---|---|---|
| No. 2 Louisville†** | 14 | – | 4 | .778 | 35 | – | 5 | .875 |
| No. 8 Georgetown | 14 | – | 4 | .778 | 25 | – | 7 | .781 |
| No. 15 Marquette | 14 | – | 4 | .778 | 26 | – | 9 | .743 |
| No. 20 Pittsburgh | 12 | – | 6 | .667 | 24 | – | 9 | .727 |
| No. 16 Syracuse | 11 | – | 7 | .611 | 30 | – | 10 | .750 |
| No. 23 Notre Dame | 11 | – | 7 | .611 | 25 | – | 10 | .714 |
| Villanova | 10 | – | 8 | .556 | 20 | – | 14 | .588 |
| Connecticut* | 10 | – | 8 | .556 | 20 | – | 10 | .667 |
| Cincinnati | 9 | – | 9 | .500 | 22 | – | 12 | .647 |
| Providence | 9 | – | 9 | .500 | 19 | – | 15 | .559 |
| St. John's | 8 | – | 10 | .444 | 17 | – | 16 | .515 |
| Rutgers | 5 | – | 13 | .278 | 15 | – | 16 | .484 |
| Seton Hall | 3 | – | 15 | .167 | 15 | – | 18 | .455 |
| South Florida | 3 | – | 15 | .167 | 12 | – | 19 | .387 |
| DePaul | 2 | – | 16 | .111 | 11 | – | 21 | .344 |
† 2013 Big East tournament winner As of March 30, 2013; Rankings from AP Poll; *Ineligible for postseason play due to APR penalties.

2012–13 Big Sky men's basketball standings
| | Conf. | | | | Overall |
| Team | W | | L | PCT | W | | L | PCT |
|---|---|---|---|---|---|---|---|---|
| Montana † | 19 | – | 1 | .950 | 25 | – | 7 | .781 |
| Weber State | 18 | – | 2 | .900 | 30 | – | 7 | .811 |
| North Dakota | 12 | – | 8 | .600 | 16 | – | 17 | .485 |
| Montana State | 10 | – | 10 | .500 | 13 | – | 17 | .433 |
| Northern Colorado | 10 | – | 10 | .500 | 13 | – | 18 | .419 |
| Sacramento State | 8 | – | 12 | .400 | 14 | – | 15 | .483 |
| Southern Utah | 8 | – | 12 | .400 | 11 | – | 20 | .355 |
| Northern Arizona | 8 | – | 12 | .400 | 11 | – | 21 | .344 |
| Eastern Washington | 7 | – | 13 | .350 | 10 | – | 21 | .323 |
| Portland State | 5 | – | 15 | .250 | 8 | – | 20 | .286 |
| Idaho State | 5 | – | 15 | .250 | 6 | – | 24 | .200 |
† Conference tournament winner

2012–13 Big South men's basketball standings
| | Conf. | | | | Overall |
| Team | W | | L | PCT | W | | L | PCT |
|---|---|---|---|---|---|---|---|---|
North
| High Point | 12 | – | 4 | .750 | 17 | – | 14 | .548 |
| VMI | 8 | – | 8 | .500 | 14 | – | 17 | .452 |
| Radford | 7 | – | 9 | .438 | 13 | – | 19 | .406 |
| Campbell | 7 | – | 9 | .438 | 13 | – | 20 | .394 |
| Liberty † | 6 | – | 10 | .375 | 15 | – | 21 | .417 |
| Longwood | 4 | – | 12 | .250 | 8 | – | 25 | .242 |
South
| Charleston Southern | 12 | – | 4 | .750 | 19 | – | 13 | .594 |
| Gardner–Webb | 11 | – | 5 | .688 | 21 | – | 13 | .618 |
| UNC Asheville | 10 | – | 6 | .625 | 16 | – | 16 | .500 |
| Coastal Carolina | 9 | – | 7 | .563 | 14 | – | 15 | .483 |
| Winthrop | 6 | – | 10 | .375 | 14 | – | 17 | .452 |
| Presbyterian | 4 | – | 12 | .250 | 8 | – | 24 | .250 |
† 2013 Big South tournament winner As of March 20, 2013; Rankings from AP Poll

2012–13 Big Ten Conference men's basketball standings
| | Conf. | | | | Overall |
| Team | W | | L | PCT | W | | L | PCT |
|---|---|---|---|---|---|---|---|---|
| No. 4 Indiana | 14 | – | 4 | .778 | 29 | – | 7 | .806 |
| No. 7 Ohio State † | 13 | – | 5 | .722 | 29 | – | 8 | .784 |
| No. 9 Michigan State | 13 | – | 5 | .722 | 27 | – | 9 | .750 |
| No. 10 Michigan | 12 | – | 6 | .667 | 31 | – | 8 | .795 |
| No. 18 Wisconsin | 12 | – | 6 | .667 | 23 | – | 12 | .657 |
| Iowa | 9 | – | 9 | .500 | 25 | – | 13 | .658 |
| Illinois | 8 | – | 10 | .444 | 23 | – | 13 | .639 |
| Minnesota | 8 | – | 10 | .444 | 21 | – | 13 | .618 |
| Purdue | 8 | – | 10 | .444 | 16 | – | 18 | .471 |
| Nebraska | 5 | – | 13 | .278 | 15 | – | 18 | .455 |
| Northwestern | 4 | – | 14 | .222 | 13 | – | 19 | .406 |
| Penn State | 2 | – | 16 | .111 | 10 | – | 21 | .323 |
† 2013 Big Ten tournament winner Rankings from AP Poll

2012–13 Big 12 men's basketball standings
| | Conf. | | | | Overall |
| Team | W | | L | PCT | W | | L | PCT |
|---|---|---|---|---|---|---|---|---|
| No. 3 Kansas † | 14 | – | 4 | .778 | 31 | – | 6 | .838 |
| No. 12 Kansas State | 14 | – | 4 | .778 | 27 | – | 8 | .771 |
| No. 17 Oklahoma State | 13 | – | 5 | .722 | 24 | – | 9 | .727 |
| Oklahoma | 11 | – | 7 | .611 | 20 | – | 12 | .625 |
| Iowa State | 11 | – | 7 | .611 | 23 | – | 12 | .657 |
| Baylor | 9 | – | 9 | .500 | 23 | – | 14 | .622 |
| Texas | 7 | – | 11 | .389 | 16 | – | 18 | .471 |
| West Virginia | 6 | – | 12 | .333 | 13 | – | 19 | .406 |
| Texas Tech | 3 | – | 15 | .167 | 11 | – | 20 | .355 |
| TCU | 2 | – | 16 | .111 | 11 | – | 21 | .344 |
† 2013 Big 12 Tournament winner Rankings from AP poll

2012–13 Big West men's basketball standings
| | Conf. | | | | Overall |
| Team | W | | L | PCT | W | | L | PCT |
|---|---|---|---|---|---|---|---|---|
| Long Beach State | 14 | – | 4 | .778 | 19 | – | 14 | .576 |
| Pacific † | 13 | – | 5 | .722 | 22 | – | 13 | .629 |
| Cal Poly | 12 | – | 6 | .667 | 18 | – | 14 | .563 |
| UC Irvine | 11 | – | 7 | .611 | 21 | – | 16 | .568 |
| Hawai'i | 10 | – | 8 | .556 | 17 | – | 13 | .567 |
| UC Davis | 9 | – | 9 | .500 | 14 | – | 17 | .452 |
| UC Santa Barbara | 7 | – | 11 | .389 | 11 | – | 20 | .355 |
| Cal State Fullerton | 6 | – | 12 | .333 | 14 | – | 18 | .438 |
| Cal State Northridge | 5 | – | 13 | .278 | 14 | – | 17 | .452 |
| UC Riverside* | 3 | – | 15 | .167 | 6 | – | 25 | .194 |
† 2013 Big West tournament winner As of March 25, 2013; Rankings from AP Poll *ineligible for postseason play due to APR penalties

2012–13 CAA men's basketball standings
| | Conf. | | | | Overall |
| Team | W | | L | PCT | W | | L | PCT |
|---|---|---|---|---|---|---|---|---|
| Northeastern | 14 | – | 4 | .778 | 20 | – | 13 | .606 |
| Towson* | 13 | – | 5 | .722 | 18 | – | 13 | .581 |
| Delaware | 13 | – | 5 | .722 | 19 | – | 14 | .576 |
| James Madison † | 11 | – | 7 | .611 | 21 | – | 15 | .583 |
| George Mason | 10 | – | 8 | .556 | 22 | – | 16 | .579 |
| Georgia State** | 10 | – | 8 | .556 | 15 | – | 16 | .484 |
| Drexel | 9 | – | 9 | .500 | 13 | – | 18 | .419 |
| William & Mary | 7 | – | 11 | .389 | 13 | – | 17 | .433 |
| UNC Wilmington* | 5 | – | 13 | .278 | 10 | – | 20 | .333 |
| Hofstra | 4 | – | 14 | .222 | 7 | – | 25 | .219 |
| Old Dominion** | 3 | – | 15 | .167 | 5 | – | 25 | .167 |
† 2013 CAA tournament winner Rankings from AP poll *Ineligible for postseason play due to APR penalties **Ineligible for conference tournament due to changing conferences in 2013

2012–13 Conference USA men's basketball standings
| | Conf. | | | | Overall |
| Team | W | | L | PCT | W | | L | PCT |
|---|---|---|---|---|---|---|---|---|
| No. 19 Memphis † | 16 | – | 0 | 1.000 | 31 | – | 5 | .861 |
| Southern Miss | 12 | – | 4 | .750 | 27 | – | 10 | .730 |
| UTEP | 10 | – | 6 | .625 | 18 | – | 14 | .563 |
| East Carolina | 9 | – | 7 | .563 | 23 | – | 12 | .657 |
| UCF* | 9 | – | 7 | .563 | 20 | – | 11 | .645 |
| Tulsa | 8 | – | 8 | .500 | 17 | – | 16 | .515 |
| Houston | 7 | – | 9 | .438 | 20 | – | 13 | .606 |
| UAB | 7 | – | 9 | .438 | 16 | – | 17 | .485 |
| Tulane | 6 | – | 10 | .375 | 20 | – | 15 | .571 |
| Marshall | 6 | – | 10 | .375 | 13 | – | 19 | .406 |
| SMU | 5 | – | 11 | .313 | 15 | – | 17 | .469 |
| Rice | 1 | – | 15 | .063 | 5 | – | 26 | .161 |
† 2013 C-USA tournament winner As of April 2, 2013; Rankings from AP poll *Ineligible for postseason play due to NCAA sanctions

2012–13 Great West Conference men's basketball standings
| | Conf. | | | | Overall |
| Team | W | | L | PCT | W | | L | PCT |
|---|---|---|---|---|---|---|---|---|
| NJIT | 6 | – | 2 | .750 | 16 | – | 13 | .552 |
| Texas–Pan American | 5 | – | 3 | .625 | 16 | – | 16 | .500 |
| Chicago State † | 3 | – | 5 | .375 | 11 | – | 22 | .333 |
| Houston Baptist | 3 | – | 5 | .375 | 14 | – | 17 | .452 |
| Utah Valley | 3 | – | 5 | .375 | 14 | – | 18 | .438 |
† 2013 Great West tournament winner As of March 20, 2013; Rankings from AP Poll

2012–13 Horizon League men's basketball standings
| | Conf. | | | | Overall |
| Team | W | | L | PCT | W | | L | PCT |
|---|---|---|---|---|---|---|---|---|
| Valparaiso † | 13 | – | 3 | .813 | 26 | – | 8 | .765 |
| Detroit | 12 | – | 4 | .750 | 20 | – | 13 | .606 |
| Wright State | 10 | – | 6 | .625 | 23 | – | 13 | .639 |
| Green Bay | 10 | – | 6 | .625 | 18 | – | 16 | .529 |
| UIC | 7 | – | 9 | .438 | 18 | – | 16 | .529 |
| Youngstown State | 7 | – | 9 | .438 | 18 | – | 16 | .529 |
| Loyola Chicago | 5 | – | 11 | .313 | 15 | – | 16 | .484 |
| Cleveland State | 5 | – | 11 | .313 | 14 | – | 18 | .438 |
| Milwaukee | 3 | – | 13 | .188 | 8 | – | 24 | .250 |
† 2013 Horizon League Tournament winner As of March 27, 2013; Rankings from AP Poll

2012–13 Ivy League men's basketball standings
| | Conf. | | | | Overall |
| Team | W | | L | PCT | W | | L | PCT |
|---|---|---|---|---|---|---|---|---|
| x-Harvard | 11 | – | 3 | .786 | 20 | – | 10 | .667 |
| Princeton | 10 | – | 4 | .714 | 17 | – | 11 | .607 |
| Yale | 8 | – | 6 | .571 | 14 | – | 17 | .452 |
| Brown | 7 | – | 7 | .500 | 13 | – | 15 | .464 |
| Penn | 6 | – | 8 | .429 | 9 | – | 22 | .290 |
| Cornell | 5 | – | 9 | .357 | 13 | – | 18 | .419 |
| Dartmouth | 5 | – | 9 | .357 | 9 | – | 19 | .321 |
| Columbia | 4 | – | 10 | .286 | 12 | – | 16 | .429 |
As of March 23, 2013; Rankings from AP Poll x-Ivy League champion

2012–13 MAAC men's basketball standings
| | Conf. | | | | Overall |
| Team | W | | L | PCT | W | | L | PCT |
|---|---|---|---|---|---|---|---|---|
| Niagara | 13 | – | 5 | .722 | 19 | – | 14 | .576 |
| Loyola (MD) | 12 | – | 6 | .667 | 23 | – | 12 | .657 |
| Rider | 12 | – | 6 | .667 | 19 | – | 15 | .559 |
| Canisius | 11 | – | 7 | .611 | 20 | – | 14 | .588 |
| Iona † | 11 | – | 7 | .611 | 20 | – | 14 | .588 |
| Fairfield | 9 | – | 9 | .500 | 19 | – | 16 | .543 |
| Manhattan | 9 | – | 9 | .500 | 14 | – | 18 | .438 |
| Marist | 6 | – | 12 | .333 | 10 | – | 21 | .323 |
| Siena | 4 | – | 14 | .222 | 8 | – | 24 | .250 |
| Saint Peter's | 3 | – | 15 | .167 | 9 | – | 21 | .300 |
† 2013 MAAC tournament winner Rankings from AP Poll

2012–13 Mid-American Conference men's basketball standings
| | Conf. | | | | Overall |
| Team | W | | L | PCT | W | | L | PCT |
|---|---|---|---|---|---|---|---|---|
East
| Akron † | 14 | – | 2 | .875 | 26 | – | 7 | .788 |
| Ohio | 14 | – | 2 | .875 | 24 | – | 10 | .706 |
| Kent State | 9 | – | 7 | .563 | 21 | – | 14 | .600 |
| Buffalo | 7 | – | 9 | .438 | 14 | – | 20 | .412 |
| Bowling Green | 7 | – | 9 | .438 | 13 | – | 19 | .406 |
| Miami | 3 | – | 13 | .188 | 9 | – | 22 | .290 |
West
| Western Michigan | 10 | – | 6 | .625 | 22 | – | 13 | .629 |
| Toledo* | 10 | – | 6 | .625 | 15 | – | 13 | .536 |
| Ball State | 8 | – | 8 | .500 | 15 | – | 15 | .500 |
| Eastern Michigan | 7 | – | 9 | .438 | 16 | – | 18 | .471 |
| Central Michigan | 4 | – | 12 | .250 | 11 | – | 20 | .355 |
| Northern Illinois | 3 | – | 13 | .188 | 5 | – | 25 | .167 |
† 2013 MAC tournament winner As of March 27, 2013; *Ineligible for postseason due to APR penalties Rankings from AP Poll

2012–13 MEAC men's basketball standings
| | Conf. | | | | Overall |
| Team | W | | L | PCT | W | | L | PCT |
|---|---|---|---|---|---|---|---|---|
| Norfolk State | 16 | – | 0 | 1.000 | 21 | – | 12 | .636 |
| North Carolina Central | 15 | – | 1 | .938 | 22 | – | 9 | .710 |
| Savannah State | 11 | – | 5 | .688 | 19 | – | 15 | .559 |
| Hampton | 11 | – | 5 | .688 | 14 | – | 17 | .452 |
| Morgan State | 10 | – | 6 | .625 | 17 | – | 15 | .531 |
| North Carolina A&T † | 8 | – | 8 | .500 | 20 | – | 17 | .541 |
| Delaware State | 8 | – | 8 | .500 | 15 | – | 18 | .455 |
| Bethune–Cookman | 7 | – | 9 | .438 | 14 | – | 20 | .412 |
| Florida A&M | 5 | – | 11 | .313 | 8 | – | 23 | .258 |
| Coppin State | 5 | – | 11 | .313 | 8 | – | 24 | .250 |
| Howard | 4 | – | 12 | .250 | 7 | – | 24 | .226 |
| South Carolina State | 2 | – | 14 | .125 | 6 | – | 24 | .200 |
| Maryland Eastern Shore | 2 | – | 14 | .125 | 2 | – | 26 | .071 |
† 2013 MEAC tournament winner As of March 21, 2013; Rankings from AP Poll

2012–13 Missouri Valley Conference men's basketball standings
| | Conf. | | | | Overall |
| Team | W | | L | PCT | W | | L | PCT |
|---|---|---|---|---|---|---|---|---|
| No. 22 Creighton † | 13 | – | 5 | .722 | 28 | – | 8 | .778 |
| Wichita State | 12 | – | 6 | .667 | 30 | – | 9 | .769 |
| Northern Iowa | 11 | – | 7 | .611 | 21 | – | 15 | .583 |
| Evansville | 10 | – | 8 | .556 | 21 | – | 15 | .583 |
| Indiana State | 9 | – | 9 | .500 | 18 | – | 15 | .545 |
| Illinois State | 8 | – | 10 | .444 | 18 | – | 15 | .545 |
| Missouri State | 7 | – | 11 | .389 | 11 | – | 22 | .333 |
| Bradley | 7 | – | 11 | .389 | 18 | – | 17 | .514 |
| Drake | 7 | – | 11 | .389 | 15 | – | 17 | .469 |
| Southern Illinois | 6 | – | 12 | .333 | 14 | – | 17 | .452 |
† 2013 MVC tournament winner As of April 6, 2013; Rankings from AP Poll

2012–13 Mountain West Conference men's basketball standings
| | Conf. | | | | Overall |
| Team | W | | L | PCT | W | | L | PCT |
|---|---|---|---|---|---|---|---|---|
| No. 10 New Mexico † | 13 | – | 3 | .813 | 29 | – | 6 | .829 |
| Colorado State | 11 | – | 5 | .688 | 26 | – | 9 | .743 |
| UNLV | 10 | – | 6 | .625 | 25 | – | 10 | .714 |
| San Diego State | 9 | – | 7 | .563 | 23 | – | 11 | .676 |
| Boise State | 9 | – | 7 | .563 | 21 | – | 11 | .656 |
| Air Force | 8 | – | 8 | .500 | 18 | – | 14 | .563 |
| Fresno State | 5 | – | 11 | .313 | 11 | – | 19 | .367 |
| Wyoming | 4 | – | 12 | .250 | 20 | – | 14 | .588 |
| Nevada | 3 | – | 13 | .188 | 12 | – | 19 | .387 |
† 2013 MWC tournament winner Rankings from AP Poll

2012–13 Northeast Conference men's basketball standings
| | Conf. | | | | Overall |
| Team | W | | L | PCT | W | | L | PCT |
|---|---|---|---|---|---|---|---|---|
| Robert Morris | 14 | – | 4 | .778 | 24 | – | 11 | .686 |
| Bryant | 12 | – | 6 | .667 | 19 | – | 12 | .613 |
| Wagner | 12 | – | 6 | .667 | 19 | – | 12 | .613 |
| Long Island † | 12 | – | 6 | .667 | 20 | – | 14 | .588 |
| Mount St. Mary's | 11 | – | 7 | .611 | 18 | – | 14 | .563 |
| Quinnipiac | 11 | – | 7 | .611 | 15 | – | 16 | .484 |
| Central Connecticut | 9 | – | 9 | .500 | 13 | – | 17 | .433 |
| St. Francis Brooklyn | 8 | – | 10 | .444 | 12 | – | 18 | .400 |
| Sacred Heart | 7 | – | 11 | .389 | 9 | – | 20 | .310 |
| Monmouth | 5 | – | 13 | .278 | 10 | – | 21 | .323 |
| Saint Francis (PA) | 5 | – | 13 | .278 | 5 | – | 24 | .172 |
| Fairleigh Dickinson | 2 | – | 16 | .111 | 7 | – | 24 | .226 |
† 2013 NEC tournament winner As of March 25, 2013; Rankings from AP Poll

2012–13 Ohio Valley Conference men's basketball standings
| | Conf. | | | | Overall |
| Team | W | | L | PCT | W | | L | PCT |
|---|---|---|---|---|---|---|---|---|
East
| Belmont † | 14 | – | 2 | .875 | 26 | – | 7 | .788 |
| Eastern Kentucky | 12 | – | 4 | .750 | 25 | – | 10 | .714 |
| Tennessee State | 11 | – | 5 | .688 | 18 | – | 15 | .545 |
| Jacksonville State* | 8 | – | 8 | .500 | 17 | – | 11 | .607 |
| Morehead State | 8 | – | 8 | .500 | 15 | – | 18 | .455 |
| Tennessee Tech | 5 | – | 11 | .313 | 12 | – | 17 | .414 |
West
| Murray State | 10 | – | 6 | .625 | 21 | – | 10 | .677 |
| Southeast Missouri State | 8 | – | 8 | .500 | 17 | – | 16 | .515 |
| Eastern Illinois | 6 | – | 10 | .375 | 11 | – | 21 | .344 |
| SIU Edwardsville | 5 | – | 11 | .313 | 9 | – | 18 | .333 |
| UT Martin | 5 | – | 11 | .313 | 9 | – | 21 | .300 |
| Austin Peay | 4 | – | 12 | .250 | 8 | – | 23 | .258 |
† 2013 OVC tournament winner As of March 23, 2013 * Ineligible for Postseason play due to APR Penalties; Rankings from AP Poll

2012–13 Pac-12 Conference men's basketball standings
| | Conf. | | | | Overall |
| Team | W | | L | PCT | W | | L | PCT |
|---|---|---|---|---|---|---|---|---|
| No. 24 UCLA | 13 | – | 5 | .722 | 25 | – | 10 | .714 |
| No. 25 Oregon † | 12 | – | 6 | .667 | 28 | – | 9 | .757 |
| No. 21 Arizona | 12 | – | 6 | .667 | 27 | – | 8 | .771 |
| California | 12 | – | 6 | .667 | 21 | – | 12 | .636 |
| Colorado | 10 | – | 8 | .556 | 21 | – | 12 | .636 |
| Arizona State | 9 | – | 9 | .500 | 22 | – | 13 | .629 |
| Stanford | 9 | – | 9 | .500 | 19 | – | 15 | .559 |
| Washington | 9 | – | 9 | .500 | 18 | – | 16 | .529 |
| USC | 9 | – | 9 | .500 | 14 | – | 18 | .438 |
| Utah | 5 | – | 13 | .278 | 15 | – | 18 | .455 |
| Oregon State | 4 | – | 14 | .222 | 14 | – | 18 | .438 |
| Washington State | 4 | – | 14 | .222 | 13 | – | 19 | .406 |
† Conference tournament winner As of March 23, 2013; Rankings from AP Poll

2012–13 Patriot League men's basketball standings
| | Conf. | | | | Overall |
| Team | W | | L | PCT | W | | L | PCT |
|---|---|---|---|---|---|---|---|---|
| Bucknell † | 12 | – | 2 | .857 | 28 | – | 6 | .824 |
| Lehigh | 10 | – | 4 | .714 | 21 | – | 10 | .677 |
| Lafayette | 10 | – | 4 | .714 | 19 | – | 15 | .559 |
| Army | 8 | – | 6 | .571 | 16 | – | 15 | .516 |
| American | 5 | – | 9 | .357 | 10 | – | 20 | .333 |
| Colgate | 5 | – | 9 | .357 | 11 | – | 21 | .344 |
| Holy Cross | 4 | – | 10 | .286 | 12 | – | 18 | .400 |
| Navy | 2 | – | 12 | .143 | 8 | – | 23 | .258 |
† 2013 Patriot League tournament winner

2012–13 Southeastern Conference men's basketball standings
| | Conf. | | | | Overall |
| Team | W | | L | PCT | W | | L | PCT |
|---|---|---|---|---|---|---|---|---|
| No. 14 Florida | 14 | – | 4 | .778 | 29 | – | 8 | .784 |
| Ole Miss † | 12 | – | 6 | .667 | 27 | – | 9 | .750 |
| Alabama | 12 | – | 6 | .667 | 23 | – | 13 | .639 |
| Kentucky | 12 | – | 6 | .667 | 21 | – | 12 | .636 |
| Missouri | 11 | – | 7 | .611 | 23 | – | 11 | .676 |
| Tennessee | 11 | – | 7 | .611 | 20 | – | 13 | .606 |
| Arkansas | 10 | – | 8 | .556 | 19 | – | 13 | .594 |
| LSU | 9 | – | 9 | .500 | 19 | – | 12 | .613 |
| Georgia | 9 | – | 9 | .500 | 15 | – | 17 | .469 |
| Vanderbilt | 8 | – | 10 | .444 | 16 | – | 17 | .485 |
| Texas A&M | 7 | – | 11 | .389 | 18 | – | 15 | .545 |
| South Carolina | 4 | – | 14 | .222 | 14 | – | 18 | .438 |
| Mississippi State | 4 | – | 14 | .222 | 10 | – | 22 | .313 |
| Auburn | 3 | – | 15 | .167 | 9 | – | 23 | .281 |
† 2013 SEC tournament winner As of March 31, 2013; Rankings from AP poll

2012–13 Southern Conference men's basketball standings
| | Conf. | | | | Overall |
| Team | W | | L | PCT | W | | L | PCT |
|---|---|---|---|---|---|---|---|---|
North
| Elon | 13 | – | 5 | .722 | 21 | – | 12 | .636 |
| Appalachian State | 10 | – | 8 | .556 | 15 | – | 16 | .484 |
| Western Carolina | 9 | – | 9 | .500 | 14 | – | 19 | .424 |
| Samford | 9 | – | 9 | .500 | 11 | – | 21 | .344 |
| Chattanooga | 8 | – | 10 | .444 | 13 | – | 19 | .406 |
| UNC Greensboro | 6 | – | 12 | .333 | 9 | – | 22 | .290 |
South
| Davidson † | 17 | – | 1 | .944 | 26 | – | 8 | .765 |
| College of Charleston | 14 | – | 4 | .778 | 24 | – | 11 | .686 |
| Georgia Southern | 7 | – | 11 | .389 | 14 | – | 19 | .424 |
| Wofford | 7 | – | 11 | .389 | 13 | – | 19 | .406 |
| The Citadel | 5 | – | 13 | .278 | 8 | – | 22 | .267 |
| Furman | 3 | – | 15 | .167 | 7 | – | 24 | .226 |
† SoCon Tournament winner As of March 20, 2013; Rankings from AP Poll

2012–13 Southland Conference men's basketball standings
| | Conf. | | | | Overall |
| Team | W | | L | PCT | W | | L | PCT |
|---|---|---|---|---|---|---|---|---|
| Stephen F. Austin | 16 | – | 2 | .889 | 27 | – | 5 | .844 |
| Northwestern State † | 15 | – | 3 | .833 | 23 | – | 9 | .719 |
| Oral Roberts | 13 | – | 5 | .722 | 20 | – | 15 | .571 |
| Southeastern Louisiana | 10 | – | 8 | .556 | 13 | – | 18 | .419 |
| Sam Houston State | 8 | – | 10 | .444 | 17 | – | 17 | .500 |
| Nicholls State | 8 | – | 10 | .444 | 9 | – | 21 | .300 |
| McNeese State | 7 | – | 11 | .389 | 14 | – | 17 | .452 |
| Central Arkansas | 7 | – | 11 | .389 | 13 | – | 17 | .433 |
| Texas A&M–Corpus Christi* | 5 | – | 13 | .278 | 6 | – | 23 | .207 |
| Lamar | 1 | – | 17 | .056 | 3 | – | 28 | .097 |
† 2013 Southland tournament winner As of March 27, 2013 *ineligible for Postseason play due to APR Penalties; Rankings from AP Poll

2012–13 SWAC men's basketball standings
| | Conf. | | | | Overall |
| Team | W | | L | PCT | W | | L | PCT |
|---|---|---|---|---|---|---|---|---|
| Texas Southern** | 16 | – | 2 | .889 | 17 | – | 14 | .548 |
| Southern † | 15 | – | 3 | .833 | 23 | – | 10 | .697 |
| Arkansas–Pine Bluff* | 15 | – | 3 | .833 | 16 | – | 14 | .533 |
| Jackson State | 9 | – | 9 | .500 | 11 | – | 18 | .379 |
| Prairie View A&M | 8 | – | 10 | .444 | 15 | – | 19 | .441 |
| Alabama State | 8 | – | 10 | .444 | 10 | – | 22 | .313 |
| Alcorn State | 8 | – | 10 | .444 | 10 | – | 24 | .294 |
| Alabama A&M | 6 | – | 12 | .333 | 11 | – | 20 | .355 |
| Mississippi Valley State* | 5 | – | 13 | .278 | 5 | – | 23 | .179 |
| Grambling State | 0 | – | 18 | .000 | 0 | – | 28 | .000 |
† 2013 SWAC tournament winner As of March 21, 2013; *Ineligible for postseason play due to APR penalties **Ineligible for postseason play due to NCAA sanctions Rankings from AP Poll

2012–13 Summit League men's basketball standings
| | Conf. | | | | Overall |
| Team | W | | L | PCT | W | | L | PCT |
|---|---|---|---|---|---|---|---|---|
| South Dakota State † | 13 | – | 3 | .813 | 25 | – | 10 | .714 |
| Western Illinois | 13 | – | 3 | .813 | 22 | – | 9 | .710 |
| North Dakota State | 12 | – | 4 | .750 | 24 | – | 10 | .706 |
| Oakland | 10 | – | 6 | .625 | 16 | – | 17 | .485 |
| IPFW | 7 | – | 9 | .438 | 16 | – | 17 | .485 |
| Omaha * | 6 | – | 10 | .375 | 11 | – | 20 | .355 |
| UMKC | 5 | – | 11 | .313 | 8 | – | 24 | .250 |
| South Dakota | 5 | – | 11 | .313 | 10 | – | 20 | .333 |
| IUPUI | 1 | – | 15 | .063 | 6 | – | 26 | .188 |
† 2013 Summit League Tournament winner Rankings from AP Poll * Ineligible for postseason due to program transition to NCAA Division I

2012–13 Sun Belt Conference men's basketball standings
| | Conf. | | | | Overall |
| Team | W | | L | PCT | W | | L | PCT |
|---|---|---|---|---|---|---|---|---|
East
| Middle Tennessee | 19 | – | 1 | .950 | 28 | – | 6 | .824 |
| South Alabama | 14 | – | 6 | .700 | 17 | – | 13 | .567 |
| FIU | 11 | – | 9 | .550 | 18 | – | 14 | .563 |
| WKU † | 10 | – | 10 | .500 | 20 | – | 16 | .556 |
| Florida Atlantic | 9 | – | 11 | .450 | 14 | – | 18 | .438 |
| Troy | 6 | – | 14 | .300 | 12 | – | 21 | .364 |
West
| Arkansas State | 12 | – | 8 | .600 | 19 | – | 12 | .613 |
| Arkansas–Little Rock | 11 | – | 9 | .550 | 17 | – | 15 | .531 |
| Louisiana–Lafayette | 8 | – | 12 | .400 | 13 | – | 20 | .394 |
| North Texas | 7 | – | 13 | .350 | 12 | – | 20 | .375 |
| Louisiana–Monroe | 3 | – | 17 | .150 | 4 | – | 23 | .148 |
† 2013 Sun Belt Tournament winner As of March 22, 2013; Rankings from AP Poll

2012–13 West Coast Conference men's basketball standings
| | Conf. | | | | Overall |
| Team | W | | L | PCT | W | | L | PCT |
|---|---|---|---|---|---|---|---|---|
| No. 1 Gonzaga† | 16 | – | 0 | 1.000 | 32 | – | 3 | .914 |
| Saint Mary's | 14 | – | 2 | .875 | 28 | – | 7 | .800 |
| BYU | 10 | – | 6 | .625 | 24 | – | 12 | .667 |
| Santa Clara | 9 | – | 7 | .563 | 26 | – | 12 | .684 |
| San Francisco | 7 | – | 9 | .438 | 15 | – | 16 | .484 |
| San Diego | 7 | – | 9 | .438 | 16 | – | 18 | .471 |
| Pepperdine | 4 | – | 12 | .250 | 12 | – | 18 | .400 |
| Portland | 4 | – | 12 | .250 | 11 | – | 21 | .344 |
| Loyola Marymount | 1 | – | 15 | .063 | 11 | – | 23 | .324 |
† Conference tournament winner Rankings from AP poll

2012–13 WAC men's basketball standings
| | Conf. | | | | Overall |
| Team | W | | L | PCT | W | | L | PCT |
|---|---|---|---|---|---|---|---|---|
| Louisiana Tech* | 16 | – | 2 | .889 | 27 | – | 7 | .794 |
| Denver | 16 | – | 2 | .889 | 22 | – | 10 | .688 |
| New Mexico State † | 14 | – | 4 | .778 | 24 | – | 11 | .686 |
| Utah State | 11 | – | 7 | .611 | 21 | – | 10 | .677 |
| Texas–Arlington | 11 | – | 7 | .611 | 19 | – | 14 | .576 |
| Idaho | 7 | – | 11 | .389 | 12 | – | 18 | .400 |
| Texas State | 5 | – | 13 | .278 | 12 | – | 22 | .353 |
| UTSA | 3 | – | 14 | .176 | 10 | – | 22 | .313 |
| San Jose State | 3 | – | 14 | .176 | 9 | – | 20 | .310 |
| Seattle | 3 | – | 15 | .167 | 8 | – | 22 | .267 |
† 2013 WAC tournament winner As of March 25, 2013 * WAC Tournament #1 seed Rankings from AP Poll

=== Division I independents ===
Two schools played as Division I independents.

2012–13 NCAA Division I men's basketball independents standings
| | Conf. | | | | Overall |
| Team | W | | L | PCT | W | | L | PCT |
|---|---|---|---|---|---|---|---|---|
| Cal State Bakersfield | | – | | – | 14 | – | 16 | .467 |
| New Orleans | | – | | – | 8 | – | 18 | .308 |
Rankings from AP Poll

=== Informal championships ===
| Conference | Regular season winner | Most Valuable Player |
|---|---|---|
| Philadelphia Big 5 | La Salle & Temple | Khalif Wyatt, Temple |

La Salle and Temple finished with 3–1 records in head-to-head competition among the Philadelphia Big 5.

=== Statistical leaders ===
Source for additional stats categories

| Points per game | | | Rebounds per game | | | Assists per game | | | Steals per game | | |
| Player | School | PPG | Player | School | RPG | Player | School | APG | Player | School | SPG |
| Erick Green | Virginia Tech | 25.0 | O. D. Anosike | Siena | 11.4 | Jason Brickman | LIU Brooklyn | 8.5 | Duke Mondy | Oakland | 3.03 |
| Doug McDermott | Creighton | 23.2 | Jerrelle Benimon | Towson | 11.2 | Phil Gaetano | Sacred Heart | 7.9 | Marcus Smart | Oklahoma St. | 3.00 |
| Lamont Jones | Iona | 22.6 | André Roberson | Colorado | 11.2 | Michael Carter-Williams | Syracuse | 7.3 | Anthony Hickey | LSU | 2.93 |
| Nate Wolters | S. Dakota St. | 22.3 | Mike Muscala | Bucknell | 11.1 | Larry Drew II | UCLA | 7.3 | Michael Carter-Williams | Syracuse | 2.78 |
| Travis Bader | Oakland | 22.1 | Richard Howell | NC State | 10.9 | Chaz Williams | UMass | 7.3 | Bernard Thompson | FGCU | 2.76 |

| Blocked shots per game | | | Field goal percentage | | | Three-point field goal percentage | | | Free throw percentage | | |
| Player | School | BPG | Player | School | FG% | Player | School | 3FG% | Player | School | FT% |
| Chris Obekpa | St. John's | 4.03 | Taylor Smith | Stephen F. Austin | 69.4 | Tyrus McGee | Iowa St. | 46.4 | Nik Cochran | Davidson | 93.5 |
| Jeff Withey | Kansas | 3.95 | Marshall Bjorklund | N. Dakota St. | 66.7 | Ryan Sypkens | UC Davis | 46.1 | Keith Hornsby | UNC Asheville | 92.5 |
| Zeke Marshall | Akron | 3.70 | Kelly Olynyk | Gonzaga | 62.9 | Ian Clark | Belmont | 45.9 | Austin Morgan | Yale | 91.2 |
| Jordan Bachynski | Arizona St. | 3.43 | T. J. Warren | NC State | 62.2 | Scott Bamforth | Weber St. | 45.4 | Holton Hunsaker | Utah Valley | 90.4 |
| Chris Horton | Austin Peay | 3.23 | Jameel Warney | Stony Brook | 61.8 | Malcolm Miller | Southern | 45.2 | Travis Smith | Mercer | 89.8 |

== Postseason tournaments ==
=== NCAA tournament ===
==== Final Four – Georgia Dome, Atlanta, Georgia ====
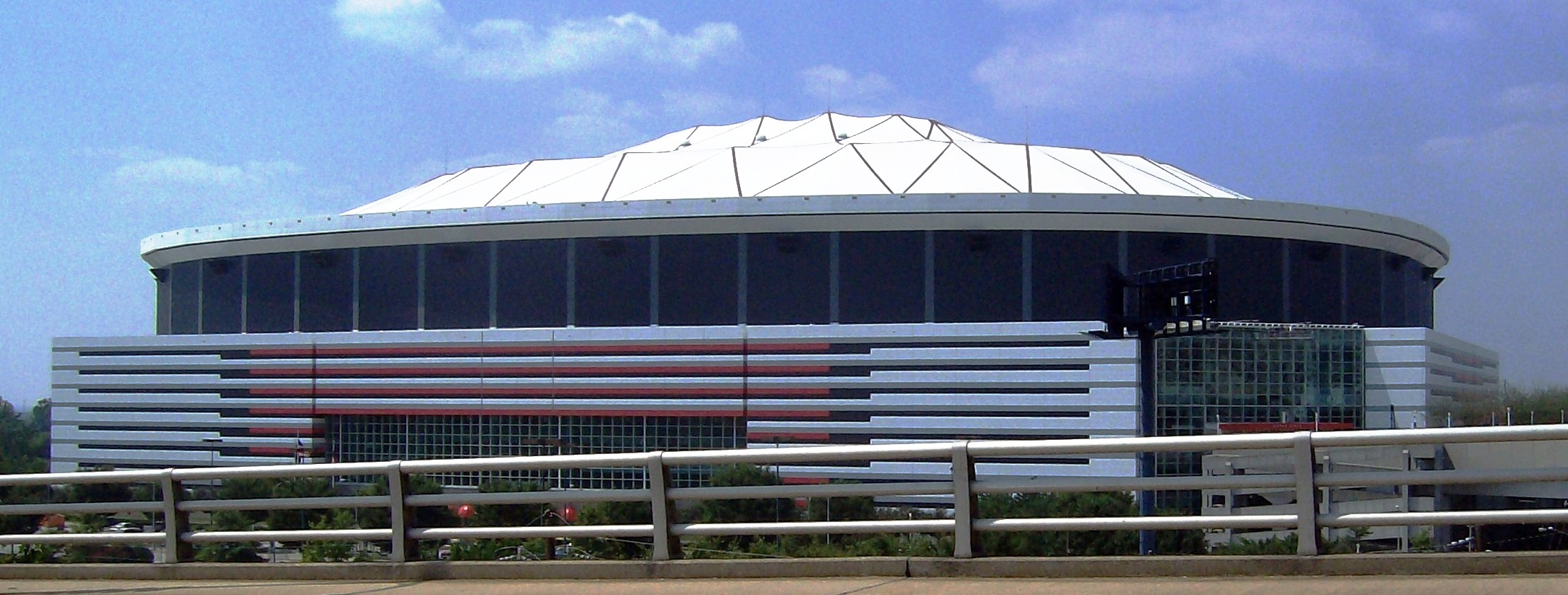
The Georgia Dome in Atlanta, Georgia, hosted the NCAA men's Final Four.

National Semifinals; April 6, 2013
MW1 | Louisville | 72
W9 | Wichita State | 68
S4 | Michigan | 61
E4 | Syracuse | 56

National Championship Game; April 8, 2013
MW1 | Louisville | 82
S4 | Michigan | 76

==== Tournament upsets ====
For this list, a "major upset" is defined as a win by a team seeded 7 or more spots below its defeated opponent.

| Date | Winner | Score | Loser |
|---|---|---|---|
| March 21 | Oregon (#12, Midwest) | 68–55 | Oklahoma State (#5, Midwest) |
| March 21 | California (#12, East) | 64–61 | UNLV (#5, East) |
| March 21 | Harvard (#14, West) | 68–62 | New Mexico (#3, West) |
| March 22 | Ole Miss (#12, West) | 57–46 | Wisconsin (#5, West) |
| March 22 | La Salle (#13, West) | 63–61 | Kansas State (#4, West) |
| March 22 | Florida Gulf Coast (#15, South) | 78–68 | Georgetown (#2, South) |
| March 23 | Oregon (#12, Midwest) | 74–57 | Saint Louis (#4, Midwest) |
| March 23 | Wichita State (#9, West) | 76–70 | Gonzaga (#1, West) |
| March 24 | Florida Gulf Coast (#15, South) | 81–71 | San Diego State (#7, South) |
| March 30 | Wichita State (#9, West) | 70–66 | Ohio State (#2, West) |

=== National Invitation tournament ===
After the NCAA tournament field is announced, the NCAA invited 32 teams to participate in the National Invitation Tournament. The tournament will begin on March 19, 2013, with all games prior to the semifinals played on campus sites. The semifinals and final will be respectively held on April 2 and April 4, 2013, at the traditional site of Madison Square Garden.

==== NIT Semifinals and Final ====
Played at Madison Square Garden in New York City

Semifinals; April 2, 2013
2 | Baylor | 76
3 | BYU | 70
2 | Maryland | 60
3 | Iowa | 71

Championship game April 4, 2013
2 | Baylor | 74
3 | Iowa | 54

=== College Basketball Invitational ===
The fifth College Basketball Invitational (CBI) Tournament began on March 19, 2013, and ended with a best-of-three final scheduled for April 1, 3, and 5; the final went the full three games. This tournament featured 16 teams who were left out of the NCAA tournament and NIT.

Semifinals; April 2013
Western Michigan | 52
George Mason | 62
Santa Clara | 81
Wright State | 59

Championship Series; April 2013
George Mason | 73 | 73 | 77
Santa Clara | 81 | 66 | 80

=== CollegeInsider.com Postseason tournament ===
The fourth CollegeInsider.com Postseason Tournament was held beginning March 2013 and ending with a championship game in April 2013. This tournament places an emphasis on selecting successful teams from "mid-major" conferences who were left out of the NCAA tournament and NIT. 32 teams participated in this tournament, which granted an automatic bid to the Great West Conference men's basketball tournament champion.

Semifinals; April 2013
Evansville | 58
East Carolina | 81
Weber State | 59
Northern Iowa | 56

Championship; April 2013
East Carolina | 77
Weber State | 74

== Award winners ==
=== Consensus All-American teams ===
The following players are recognized as the 2013 Consensus All-Americans:

Consensus First Team
| Player | Position | Class | Team |
|---|---|---|---|
| Trey Burke | PG | Sophomore | Michigan |
| Doug McDermott | SF | Junior | Creighton |
| Victor Oladipo | SG | Junior | Indiana |
| Kelly Olynyk | PF-C | Junior | Gonzaga |
| Otto Porter | F | Sophomore | Georgetown |

Consensus Second Team
| Player | Position | Class | Team |
|---|---|---|---|
| Ben McLemore | SG | Freshman | Kansas |
| Mason Plumlee | PF-C | Senior | Duke |
| Marcus Smart | PG | Freshman | Oklahoma State |
| Jeff Withey | C | Senior | Kansas |
| Cody Zeller | PF | Sophomore | Indiana |

=== Major player of the year awards ===
- Wooden Award: Trey Burke, Michigan
- Naismith Award: Trey Burke, Michigan
- Associated Press Player of the Year: Trey Burke, Michigan
- NABC Player of the Year: Trey Burke, Michigan
- Oscar Robertson Trophy (USBWA): Trey Burke, Michigan
- Sporting News Player of the Year: Victor Oladipo, Indiana

=== Major freshman of the year awards ===
- Wayman Tisdale Award (USBWA): Marcus Smart, Oklahoma State
- Sporting News Freshman of the Year: Marcus Smart, Oklahoma State

=== Major coach of the year awards ===
- Associated Press Coach of the Year: Jim Larrañaga, Miami (Florida)
- Henry Iba Award (USBWA): Jim Larrañaga, Miami (Florida)
- NABC Coach of the Year: Jim Crews, Saint Louis
- Naismith College Coach of the Year: Jim Larrañaga, Miami (Florida)
- Sporting News Coach of the Year: Jim Crews, Saint Louis

=== Other major awards ===
- Bob Cousy Award (Best point guard): Trey Burke, Michigan
- Pete Newell Big Man Award (Best big man): Mason Plumlee, Duke
- NABC Defensive Player of the Year: Victor Oladipo, Indiana & Jeff Withey, Kansas
- Frances Pomeroy Naismith Award (Best senior 6'0"/1.83 m or shorter): Peyton Siva, Louisville
- Senior CLASS Award (top senior): Jordan Hulls, Indiana
- Robert V. Geasey Trophy (Top player in Philadelphia Big 5): Khalif Wyatt, Temple
- Haggerty Award (Top player in New York City metro area): Lamont Jones, Iona
- Ben Jobe Award (Top minority coach): Kevin Ollie, Connecticut
- Hugh Durham Award (Top mid-major coach): Danny Kaspar, Stephen F. Austin
- Jim Phelan Award (Top head coach): Dana Altman, Oregon
- Lefty Driesell Award (Top defensive player): Tommy Brenton, Stony Brook
- Lou Henson Award (Top mid-major player): Matthew Dellavedova, Saint Mary's
- Lute Olson Award (Top non-freshman or transfer player): Shane Larkin, Miami (Florida)
- Skip Prosser Man of the Year Award (Coach with moral character): Joe Mihalich, Niagara
- Academic All-American of the Year (Top scholar-athlete): Aaron Craft, Ohio State
- Elite 89 Award (Top GPA among upperclass players at Final Four): Wayne Blackshear, Louisville

== Coaching changes ==
A number of teams changed coaches during and after the season.

| Team | Former coach | Interim coach | New coach | Reason |
|---|---|---|---|---|
| Ball State | Billy Taylor | | James Whitford | Taylor was fired following 15–15 records in each of his last two seasons. |
| Buffalo | Reggie Witherspoon | | Bobby Hurley | Witherspoon was fired after 14 seasons. |
| Butler | Brad Stevens | | Brandon Miller | Stevens left to become the newest head coach of the National Basketball Association's Boston Celtics. |
| Cal State Northridge | Bobby Braswell | | Reggie Theus | Braswell was fired after 17 seasons, ending with a 14–17 season. Although he led the Matadors to two NCAA tournaments and three 20-win seasons, his tenure was also marked by numerous off-court problems. Ironically, incoming Northridge athletic director Brandon Martin, who announced Braswell's firing, played under him in high school. Northridge went to the D-League to hire Theus, who is also a former coach of New Mexico State and the Sacramento Kings, and played 13 seasons in the NBA. |
| Campbell | Robbie Laing | | Kevin McGeehan | Campbell went 13-20 and finished tied for third in the league's North Division with a 7–9 conference record. |
| Connecticut | Jim Calhoun | | Kevin Ollie | Calhoun retired on September 13. He won 873 games in 40 years as a head coach, first at Northeastern and the last 26 years at UConn, where he put four teams in the Final Four, winning national titles in 1999, 2004 and 2011. |
| FIU | Richard Pitino | | Anthony Evans | Pitino, son of Louisville head coach Rick Pitino, took the Minnesota job. |
| Florida Gulf Coast | Andy Enfield | | Joe Dooley | Enfield guided the Eagles to the school's first-ever NCAA tournament appearance in only its second year of Division I eligibility, then advanced to the Sweet 16 as a #15-seed – the first time in tournament history that a 15-seed had gotten so far. The University of Southern California lured Enfield away on April 1. |
| Longwood | Mike Gillian | | Jayson Gee | Gillian guided the Lancers through their transition from Division II to Division I play, and into their first season as a member of the Big South Conference. He resigned on March 14, 2013, after the Lancers' first season with less than ten wins since 2008. On April 3, Cleveland State associate head coach Jayson Gee was hired. |
| Loyola (Maryland) | Jimmy Patsos | | G. G. Smith | |
| Minnesota | Tubby Smith | | Richard Pitino | Smith was fired after six seasons at Minnesota and having compiled a 124–81 record. The Golden Gophers never finished higher than sixth in the Big Ten Conference, however. |
| New Mexico | Steve Alford | | Craig Neal | Alford left to take the UCLA job. |
| Norfolk State | Anthony Evans | Robert Jones | | Evans took the FIU job; he had been a finalist for that job the previous offseason, but had lost out to the now-departed Richard Pitino. |
| Northwestern | Bill Carmody | | Chris Collins | Carmody was fired after failing to lead Northwestern to its first ever NCAA tournament bid in thirteen seasons. He was replaced by Duke assistant Collins, the son of former NBA player and coach Doug Collins. Collins took over after the Blue Devils exited the NCAA tournament. |
| Old Dominion | Blaine Taylor | Jim Corrigan | Jeff Jones | Old Dominion fired Taylor, their all-time winningest coach, on February 5 after a 2–20 start. |
| Rutgers | Mike Rice | | Eddie Jordan | Rice was fired on April 3 after ESPN's Outside the Lines aired a video taken at a Rutgers practice that showed Rice shoving and throwing balls at players and using gay slurs. Jordan, a player on the school's 1976 Final Four team and most recently an assistant with the Los Angeles Lakers, was hired as Rice's replacement. |
| Saint Louis | Rick Majerus | | Jim Crews | Majerus stepped down prior to the season for health reasons and later died. Interim coach Crews led Saint Louis to an Atlantic 10 regular season title and was named conference coach of the year. Saint Louis removed the interim tag from Crews on April 12. |
| San Jose State | George Nessman | | Dave Wojcik | San Jose State was looking to upgrade the program before its move to the more strenuous Mountain West Conference next season. Boise State associate head coach Dave Wojcik was hired as Nessman's successor on March 30. |
| Siena | Mitch Buonaguro | | Jimmy Patsos | According to ESPN.com, "Buonaguro went 35-59 in three seasons with the Saints, never finishing a season with a winning record or in the top half of the Metro Atlantic Athletic Conference. The three-year slide immediately followed the most successful three-year run in school history. Siena won MAAC titles in 2008, 2009 and 2010 -- all under coach Fran McCaffery, with Buonaguro his top assistant." |
| South Alabama | Ronnie Arrow | Jeff Price | Matthew Graves | Arrow retired December 19, 2012. Jeff Price was named interim head coach. Butler associate head coach Matt Graves was named the new head coach of South Alabama on March 25, 2013. |
| South Carolina State | Tim Carter | Murray Garvin | | Carter resigned in season on February 6, 2013, after starting 4–17. |
| South Dakota | Dave Boots | Joey James | | Boots resigned in August, 2013. |
| Texas Tech | Billy Gillispie | Chris Walker | Tubby Smith | The Red Raiders were 8–23 overall, 1–17 in the Big 12, in Gillispie's lone season as successor to Pat Knight. Gillispie's tenure in Lubbock began to unravel in September 2012 when CBSSports.com and ESPN.com, citing several former players, reported the coach regularly violated NCAA practice-time rules and mistreated players to the point of causing injury |
| UCLA | Ben Howland | | Steve Alford | According to the Orange County Register, "...the perfect storm of attendance, reputation, and very little NCAA tournament success was enough to doom Howland after 10 seasons." |
| UMBC | Randy Monroe | | Aki Thomas | Monroe resigned as head men's basketball coach on October 10. He led UMBC to its lone America East Conference title and NCAA tournament appearance in the 2007–08 season. Monroe directed the third-most games (245) of any head coach in UMBC men's basketball history and finished with a career mark of 85–160. On March 4, Aki Thomas' interim tag was removed and he was promoted to permanent head coach. |
| UMKC | Matt Brown | | Kareem Richardson | Brown was fired on March 12, 2013. He went 64–122 with UMKC, including an 8–24 record in 2012–13. He was replaced by Louisville assistant Richardson, who took over after the Cardinals won the NCAA title. |
| USC | Kevin O'Neill | Bob Cantu | Andy Enfield | O'Neill was fired on January 14, 2013. USC athletic director Pat Haden cited "new energy" was needed for their program. On April 1, USC announced that they had hired Andy Enfield, the head coach who just taken Florida Gulf Coast University to the Sweet 16 as a #15-seed, the first time in NCAA tournament history that has occurred. |
