= 2012–13 Army Black Knights men's basketball team =

American college basketball season

2012–13 Army Black Knights men's basketball
- Conference: Patriot League
- Record: 16–15 (8–6 Patriot)
- Head coach: Zach Spiker (4th season)
- Assistant coaches: Jimmy Allen; Kevin App; Omar Mance; Sean Rutigliano
- Home arena: Christl Arena

2012–13 Patriot League men's basketball standings
	Conf.				Overall
Team	W		L	PCT	W		L	PCT
Bucknell †	12	–	2	.857	28	–	6	.824
Lehigh	10	–	4	.714	21	–	10	.677
Lafayette	10	–	4	.714	19	–	15	.559
Army	8	–	6	.571	16	–	15	.516
American	5	–	9	.357	10	–	20	.333
Colgate	5	–	9	.357	11	–	21	.344
Holy Cross	4	–	10	.286	12	–	18	.400
Navy	2	–	12	.143	8	–	23	.258
† 2013 Patriot League tournament winner

The 2012–13 Army Black Knights men's basketball team represented the United States Military Academy during the 2012–13 NCAA Division I men's basketball season. The Black Knights, led by fourth-year head coach Zach Spiker, played their home games at Christl Arena and were members of the Patriot League. They finished the season 16–15, 8–6 in Patriot League play to finish in fourth place. They advanced to the semifinals of the Patriot League tournament, where they lost to Bucknell.

== Roster ==
Number	Name	Position	Height	Weight	Year	Hometown
0	Maxwell Lenox	Guard	6–0	190	Senior	Fairfax, Virginia
1	Cartavious Kincade	Forward	6–4	192	Junior	Baytown, Texas
2	Mo Williams	Guard	6–1	185	Sophomore	Fairfax, Virginia
3	Jason Pancoe	Guard	6–2	170	Senior	Ladera Ranch, California
4	Matt Gramling	Guard	6–3	190	Freshman	San Antonio, Texas
5	Milton Washington	Guard	6–0	180	Sophomore	Houston, Texas
10	Kyle Toth	Guard	6–1	175	Freshman	Sunnyvale, California
11	Dylan Cox	Guard	6–4	185	Freshman	Cedar Park, Texas
12	Zach Lord	Center	6–10	205	Sophomore	Keller, Texas, Texas
13	Ella Ellis	Forward	6–7	195	Senior	Houston, Texas
14	Chris Gramling	Guard	5–11	170	Sophomore	San Antonio, Texas
20	Zach Schmidt	Guard	6–3	195	Freshman	Gainesville, Florida
21	Kyle Wilson	Guard/forward	6–4	190	Freshman	Mission Viejo, California
22	Jalen Harris	Guard	5–10	150	Sophomore	Pflugerville, Texas
23	Josh Herbeck	Guard	6–3	190	Junior	Ann Arbor, Michigan
24	Billy Morrison	Forward	6–4	200	Freshman	Tucson, Arizona
25	Whit Thornton	Forward	6–7	215	Sophomore	Memphis, Tennessee
30	Sean Billerman	Guard/forward	6–4	195	Sophomore	Raleigh, North Carolina
31	Kevin Ferguson	Center	6–10	200	Freshman	Berkeley Heights, New Jersey
32	Tanner Plomb	Forward	6–7	200	Freshman	Mukwonago, Wisconsin
33	Larry Toomey	Forward	6–6	205	Freshman	St. Louis, Missouri
34	Kyle Weldon	Center	6–9	195	Freshman	Clarksville, Tennessee
35	Michael Felton	Forward	6–7	220	Sophomore	Houston, Texas
42	Jordan Springer	Forward	6–6	220	Senior	Charlotte, North Carolina
43	Travis Rollo	Forward/center	6–7	205	Freshman	Mayer, Minnesota
52	Andrew Stire	Center	6–7	227	Junior	Albany, New York

== Schedule ==
Date time, TV	Opponent	Result	Record	Site (attendance) city, state
Regular season
11/10/2012*; 2:00 pm	vs. Air Force; All-Military Classic	L 65–76	0–1	McAlister Field House (1,180); Charleston, SC
11/11/2012*; 2:00 pm	vs. VMI; All-Military Classic	W 80–74	1–1	McAlister Field House (N/A); Charleston, SC
11/16/2012*; 4:00 pm	Binghamton	W 85–76	2–1	Christl Arena (673); West Point, NY
11/20/2012*; 7:00 pm	at St. Francis (NY)	W 67–59	3–1	Generoso Pope Athletic Complex (675); Brooklyn Heights, NY
11/24/2012*; 2:00 pm	at Yale	L 83–86 ^{2OT}	3–2	John J. Lee Amphitheater (1,116); New Haven, CT
12/01/2012*; 1:00 pm	at Bryant	L 59–70	3–3	Chace Athletic Center (1,968); Smithfield, RI
12/04/2012*; 7:00 pm	Marist	W 91–57	4–3	Christl Arena (646); West Point, NY
12/08/2012*; 4:00 pm, BTN	at Penn State	L 70–78	4–4	Bryce Jordan Center (7,247); University Park, PA
12/11/2012*; 7:30 pm	at NJIT	L 67–69	4–5	Fleisher Center (619); Newark, NJ
12/14/2012*; 7:00 pm	Maine	W 96–67	5–5	Christl Arena (711); West Point, NY
12/22/2012*; 1:00 pm	Rosemont	W 90–48	6–5	Christl Arena (684); West Point, NY
12/29/2012*; 5:00 pm	at Texas A&M	L 55–61	6–6	Reed Arena (6,416); College Station, TX
12/31/2012*; 3:05 pm	at Houston Baptist	W 95–86	7–6	Sharp Gymnasium (824); Houston, TX
01/05/2013*; 3:00 pm	Columbia	L 52–64	7–7	Christl Arena (1,507); West Point, NY
01/08/2013*; 7:00 pm	at Dartmouth	L 58–75	7–8	Leede Arena (521); Hanover, NH
01/12/2013; 7:00 pm	at Bucknell	L 55–76	7–9 (0–1)	Sojka Pavilion (3,782); Lewisburg, PA
01/16/2013; 7:00 pm	Lafayette	W 77–54	8–9 (1–1)	Christl Arena (773); West Point, NY
01/20/2013; 12:00 pm, CBSSN	Navy	L 50–59	8–10 (1–2)	Christl Arena (N/A); West Point, NY
01/23/2013; 7:00 pm	Colgate	L 90–93 ^{OT}	8–11 (1–3)	Cotterell Court (432); Hamilton, NY
01/26/2013; 3:00 pm	American	W 77–64	9–11 (2–3)	Christl Arena (998); West Point, NY
01/30/2013; 7:00 pm	at Holy Cross	W 80–66	10–11 (3–3)	Hart Center (1,296); Worcester, MA
02/03/2013; 1:00 pm	Lehigh	L 76–85	10–12 (3–4)	Christl Arena (1,002); West Point, NY
02/09/2013; 4:00 pm	Bucknell	L 58–60	10–13 (3–5)	Christl Arena (2,188); West Point, NY
02/13/2013; 7:00 pm	at Lafayette	W 85–68	11–13 (4–5)	Kirby Sports Center (1,071); Easton, PA
02/16/2013; 2:00 pm, CBSSN	at Navy	W 56–55	12–13 (5–5)	Alumni Hall (5,710); Annapolis, MD
02/20/2013; 7:00 pm	Colgate	W 77–63	13–13 (6–5)	Christl Arena (769); West Point, NY
02/23/2013; 2:00 pm	at American	W 72–58	14–13 (7–5)	Bender Arena (1,704); Washington, D.C.
02/27/2013; 7:00 pm	at Holy Cross	W 69–62	15–13 (8–5)	Christl Arena (788); West Point, NY
03/02/2013; 12:00 pm	at Lehigh	L 75–81	15–14 (8–6)	Stabler Arena (1,760); Bethlehem, PA
2013 Patriot League men's basketball tournament
03/06/2013; 7:00 pm	American; Quarterfinals	W 65–44	16–14	Christl Arena (1,026); West Point, NY
03/09/2013; 4:30 pm, CBSSN	at Bucknell; Semifinals	L 70–78	16–15	Sojka Pavilion (2,784); Lewisberg, PA
*Non-conference game. ^{#}Rankings from AP Poll. (#) Tournament seedings in parentheses. All times are in Eastern Time.
