= Ryan Frazier =

American basketball coach (born 1993)

Charlotte Hornets
- Title: Assistant coach
- League: NBA

Personal information
- Born: March 13, 1993 (age 33) Washington, D.C., U.S.
- Listed height: 6 ft 0 in (1.83 m)
- Listed weight: 190 lb (86 kg)

Career information
- High school: Blake (Silver Spring, Maryland); Salisbury School (Salisbury, Connecticut)
- College: Bucknell (2012–2016)
- NBA draft: 2016: undrafted
- Position: Guard
- Coaching career: 2021–present

Career history

Coaching
- 2021–2024: New Orleans Pelicans (assistant)
- 2024–present: Charlotte Hornets (assistant)

Career highlights
- Patriot League All-Defensive team (2016)

Ryan Rodney Frazier (born March 13, 1993) is an American professional basketball coach who is an assistant coach for the Charlotte Hornets of the National Basketball Association (NBA).

== Coaching career ==
Frazier began his coaching career as a video coordinator for the Phoenix Suns under head coach Monty Williams from 2019 to 2021.

Frazier joined the New Orleans Pelicans in 2021 as an assistant coach under head coach Willie Green.

In 2024, Frazier was hired as an assistant coach by the Charlotte Hornets under head coach Charles Lee.
