= 2012–13 Ivy League men's basketball season =

- League: NCAA Division I
- Sport: Basketball
- Duration: January 12 – March 12, 2013
- Teams: 8

Regular season
- Champions: Harvard
- Runners-up: Princeton
- Season MVP: Ian Hummer, Princeton

Basketball seasons
- 2011–12 2013–14

2012–13 Ivy League men's basketball standings
	Conf.				Overall
Team	W		L	PCT	W		L	PCT
x-Harvard	11	–	3	.786	20	–	10	.667
Princeton	10	–	4	.714	17	–	11	.607
Yale	8	–	6	.571	14	–	17	.452
Brown	7	–	7	.500	13	–	15	.464
Penn	6	–	8	.429	9	–	22	.290
Cornell	5	–	9	.357	13	–	18	.419
Dartmouth	5	–	9	.357	9	–	19	.321
Columbia	4	–	10	.286	12	–	16	.429
As of March 23, 2013; Rankings from AP Poll x-Ivy League champion

The 2012–13 Ivy League men's basketball season marked the continuation of the annual tradition of competitive basketball among Ivy League members. The tradition began when the league was formed during the 1956–57 season and its history extends to the predecessor Eastern Intercollegiate Basketball League, which was formed in 1902. Due to a cheating scandal that involved defending champion Harvard, Princeton was the preseason favorite.

Harvard won the regular season title outright and earned the conference's only postseason bid. Princeton's Ian Hummer earned the Ivy League Men's Basketball Player of the Year after setting records for most single-season and career Ivy League Player of the Week awards. Harvard tied an Ivy League single-season team record with 13 combined Player of the Week and Rookie of the Week Awards. Ivy League records also fell for career games played by Hummer and career free throw percentage (Brian Barbour).

In the 2013 NCAA Division I men's basketball tournament, Harvard earned the school's first ever NCAA Division I men's basketball tournament victory and the conference's first NCAA tournament victory in three years.

== Preseason ==
The Ivy League media selected Princeton as the preseason favorite when 16 of 17 voting members (one voter selected Harvard) named Princeton first in the preseason poll. Jeff Goodman of CBS Sports also selected Princeton as his preseason choice with Harvard second, noting that Harvard had been his preseason favorite until the September 2012 Harvard cheating scandal that involved about 125 athletes and students, including Kyle Casey and Brandyn Curry who withdrew from school as a result. Casey and Curry had been first-team and second-team All-Ivy selections for the 2011–12 Ivy League men's basketball season, respectively. Both players withdrew in hopes of preserving their final year of athletic eligibility following the investigation.

== Season ==
Twelve different television networks scheduled a total of 36 Ivy League men's basketball live broadcasts for the 2012–13 season. This includes a 14-game television package, featuring all eight member institutions, with 13 games being broadcast on the NBC Sports Network and one on the CBS Sports Network. The conference endured two one-day postponements due to the February 2013 nor'easter (also known as Winter Storm Nemo). Harvard's contest against Columbia at Levien Gymnasium in Manhattan that was originally scheduled for February 9 at 7:00 PM was postponed until February 10 at 2:00 PM. Similarly, Dartmouth's game against Cornell originally scheduled to be played at 7:00 PM on February 9 at Newman Arena in Ithaca, New York was postponed until February 10 at 12:00 noon.

Led by Wesley Saunders' five Ivy League Player of the Week Awards and Siyani Chambers' six Rookie of the Week Awards, Harvard tied the Ivy League team record with thirteen single-season weekly recognitions. Meanwhile, Hummer tied the individual career record with nine player of the week awards and set a new single-season record with seven. Two Ivy League career statistical records fell. Columbia's Brian Barbour completed his career with an 89.7% free throw shooting percentage, surpassing Jim Barton of Dartmouth (class of 1989) who tallied 89.5%. Hummer surpassed former teammate Doug Davis' (class of 2012) 122 career games played with 123 games.

== Honors and accolades ==
Columbia senior guard Brian Barbour was listed among 30 preseason Senior CLASS Award candidates. Cornell's Eitan Chemerinski and Brown's Matthew Sullivan were first team All-District selections from District I placing them among the 40 candidates for the 15-man Academic All-American team. Brown, a third-team selection in 2012, was recognized as a 2013 first-team All-American.

=== In season ===
Each week the Ivy League selected one or more player(s) of the week and one or more rookie(s) of the week.

G – Guard
F – Forward
C – Center

Fr. – Freshman
So. – Sophomore
Jr. – Junior
Sr. – Senior

	Player(s) of the Week				Rookie(s) of the Week			
	Name	School	Class	Position	Name	School	Class	Position
November 12, 2012	Gabas Maldunas	Dartmouth	So.	F	Nolan Cressler	Cornell	Fr.	G
	Will Barrett	Princeton	Jr.	F				
November 19, 2012	Fran Dougherty	Penn	Jr.	F	Rafael Maia	Brown	So.	C
November 26, 2012	Shonn Miller	Cornell	So.	F	Grant Mullins	Columbia	Fr.	G
December 3, 2012	Wesley Saunders	Harvard	So.	G/F	Siyani Chambers	Harvard	Fr.	G
December 10, 2012	Wesley Saunders	Harvard	So.	G/F	Grant Mullins	Columbia	Fr.	G
	Ian Hummer	Princeton	Sr.	F				
December 17, 2012	Ian Hummer	Princeton	Sr.	F	Siyani Chambers	Harvard	Fr.	G
December 24, 2012	Ian Hummer	Princeton	Sr.	F	Hans Brase	Princeton	Fr.	F
December 31, 2012	Tucker Halpern	Brown	Jr.	F	Jamal Lewis	Penn	Fr.	G
January 7, 2013	Ian Hummer	Princeton	Sr.	F	Siyani Chambers	Harvard	Fr.	G
January 14, 2013	Wesley Saunders	Harvard	So.	G/F	Siyani Chambers	Harvard	Fr.	G
	T.J. Bray	Princeton	Jr.	G				
January 21, 2013	Sean McGonagill	Brown	Jr.	G	Darien Nelson-Henry	Penn	Fr.	C
	Mark Cisco	Columbia	Sr.	C				
January 28, 2013	Christian Webster	Harvard	Sr.	G	Siyani Chambers	Harvard	Fr.	G
	Austin Morgan	Yale	Sr.	G	Justin Sears	Yale	Fr.	F
February 4, 2013	Wesley Saunders	Harvard	So.	G/F	Rafael Maia	Brown	So.	C
	Ian Hummer	Princeton	Sr.	F				
February 11, 2013	Javier Duren	Yale	So.	G	Nolan Cressler	Cornell	Fr.	G
February 18, 2013	Kenyatta Smith	Harvard	So.	C	Cedric Kuakumensah	Brown	Fr.	F
February 25, 2013	Wesley Saunders	Harvard	So.	G/F	Tony Hicks	Penn	Fr.	G
	Ian Hummer	Princeton	Sr.	F				
March 3, 2013	Ian Hummer	Princeton	Sr.	F	Tony Hicks	Penn	Fr.	G
March 10, 2013	Gabas Maldunas	Dartmouth	So.	F	Siyani Chambers	Harvard	Fr.	G

=== All-Ivy ===
The following players earned Ivy League postseason recognition with (Class, Position – Hometown):

Player of the Year

- Ian Hummer, Princeton (Sr., F – Vienna, Va.)

Rookie of the Year

- ^Siyani Chambers, Harvard (Fr., G – Golden Valley, Minn.)

Defensive Player of the Year

- Cedric Kuakumensah, Brown (Fr., F – Worcester, Mass.)

First Team All-Ivy

- Sean McGonagill, Brown (Jr., G – Brookfield, Ill.)
- Shonn Miller, Cornell (So., F – Euclid, Ohio)
- Siyani Chambers, Harvard (Fr., G – Golden Valley, Minn.)
- ^Wesley Saunders, Harvard (So., G/F – Los Angeles)
- ^Ian Hummer, Princeton (Sr., F – Vienna, Va.)

Second Team All-Ivy

- Matthew Sullivan, Brown (Sr., G – Wilmette, Ill.)
- Brian Barbour, Columbia (Sr., G – Alamo, Calif.)
- Gabas Maldunas, Dartmouth (So., F – Panevezys, Lithuania)
- Miles Jackson-Cartwright, Penn (Jr., G – Van Nuys, Calif.)
- T.J. Bray, Princeton (Jr., G – New Berlin, Wis.)
- Austin Morgan, Yale (Sr., G – Reno, Nev.)

Honorable Mention All-Ivy

- Errick Peck, Cornell (Sr., F – Indianapolis)
- Steve Moundou-Missi, Harvard (So., F – Yaounde, Cameroon)
- Laurent Rivard, Harvard (Jr., G – Saint-Bruno, Quebec, Canada)
- Tony Hicks, Penn (Fr., G – South Holland, Ill.)
- Denton Koon, Princeton (So., G – Liberty, Mo.)
- ^Unanimous Selection

=== USBWA ===
On March 12, the U.S. Basketball Writers Association released its 2012–13 Men's All-District Teams, based upon voting from its national membership. There were nine regions from coast to coast, and a player and coach of the year were selected in each. The following lists all the Ivy League representatives selected within their respective regions.

District I (New England)

All-District Team

- Wesley Saunders, Harvard
District II (New York, New Jersey, Delaware, District of Columbia, Pennsylvania, West Virginia)

All-District Team

- Ian Hummer, Princeton

=== NABC ===
The National Association of Basketball Coaches announced their Division I All-District teams on March 26, recognizing the nation's best men's collegiate basketball student-athletes. Selected and voted on by member coaches of the NABC, 240 student-athletes, from 24 districts were chosen. The selections on this list were then eligible for the State Farm Coaches' Division I All-America teams. The following list represented the District 13 players chosen to the list.

First Team

- Ian Hummer, Princeton
- Wesley Saunders, Harvard
- Siyani Chambers, Harvard
Second Team
- none

=== Other ===
Hummer also earned Associated Press honorable mention All-American recognition.

== Postseason ==
=== NCAA tournament ===
On March 21 in the 2013 NCAA tournament, Harvard earned the school's first NCAA tournament victory and its first victory over a top 10 opponent when it defeated number three seeded New Mexico (10, AP Poll/10, Coaches' Poll). The victory was the conferences first since the 2009–10 Cornell Big Red men's basketball team advanced to the Sweet Sixteen. Two days later, the team lost to Arizona, ending its season.

Seed	Region	School	First round	Second round	Quarterfinals	Semifinals	Finals
14	West	Harvard	Defeated New Mexico 68–62	Eliminated by Arizona 74–51			
	Bids	W-L (%):	1–0 1.000	0–1 .000	0–0	0–0	Total: 1–1 .500

=== Other ===
Princeton declined any postseason invitation. No other bids were accepted.
