= 2012–13 Harvard Crimson men's basketball team =

American college basketball season

2012–13 Harvard Crimson men's basketball

Ivy League Champions

NCAA tournament, Round of 32
- Conference: Ivy League
- Record: 20–10 (11–3 Ivy)
- Head coach: Tommy Amaker (6th season)
- Assistant coaches: Brian DeStefano; Yanni Hufnagel; Brian Adams
- Home arena: Lavietes Pavilion

2012–13 Ivy League men's basketball standings
	Conf.				Overall
Team	W		L	PCT	W		L	PCT
x-Harvard	11	–	3	.786	20	–	10	.667
Princeton	10	–	4	.714	17	–	11	.607
Yale	8	–	6	.571	14	–	17	.452
Brown	7	–	7	.500	13	–	15	.464
Penn	6	–	8	.429	9	–	22	.290
Cornell	5	–	9	.357	13	–	18	.419
Dartmouth	5	–	9	.357	9	–	19	.321
Columbia	4	–	10	.286	12	–	16	.429
As of March 23, 2013; Rankings from AP Poll x-Ivy League champion

The 2012–13 Harvard Crimson men's basketball team represented Harvard University during the 2012–13 NCAA Division I men's basketball season. The Crimson, led by sixth year head coach Tommy Amaker, played their home games at Lavietes Pavilion and are members of the Ivy League.

Harvard entered the season as the two-time defending Ivy League Champion, but its roster was greatly changed due to graduation and the 2012 Harvard cheating scandal that led to the withdrawal of two star players. With reduced expectations, the team entered the season expected to finish second in conference. During the season, the team swept the three opponents that are also from Boston. The win against Boston College, gave Amaker his sixth victory against no defeats over Atlantic Coast Conference foes. Despite the team's turmoil, it prevailed to win the 2012–13 Ivy League men's basketball season regular season championship, earning the team an automatic bid to the 2013 NCAA Division I men's basketball tournament, where it won the school's first ever NCAA Division I men's basketball tournament game. The tournament victory over #3 seed New Mexico was also the school's first victory over a top 10 ranked team.

The team was led by Wesley Saunders who was unanimous First Team All-Ivy and Ivy League Rookie of the Year Siyani Chambers who was also a first team honoree. Both Steve Moundou-Missi and Laurent Rivard earned honorable mention All-Ivy recognition. Harvard tied an Ivy League single-season team record with 13 combined Player of the Week and Rookie of the Week Awards.

== Roster ==
2012–13 Harvard Crimson men's basketball team
Players
Coaches

Pos.	#	Name	Height	Weight	Year	Hometown
G	0	Laurent Rivard	6 ft 5 in (1.96 m)	214 lb (97 kg)	Jr	Saint-Bruno-de-Montarville, Quebec
G	1	Siyani Chambers	6 ft 0 in (1.83 m)	170 lb (77 kg)	Fr	Golden Valley, Minnesota
G	2	Alex Nesbitt	6 ft 1 in (1.85 m)	175 lb (79 kg)	So	Chicago, Illinois
F	12	Jeff Georgatos	6 ft 7 in (2.01 m)	210 lb (95 kg)	Sr	Dallas, Texas
F	14	Steve Moundou-Missi	6 ft 7 in (2.01 m)	225 lb (102 kg)	So	Yaoundé, Cameroon
G	15	Christian Webster	6 ft 5 in (1.96 m)	205 lb (93 kg)	Sr	Washington, D.C.
F	20	Patrick Steeves	6 ft 7 in (2.01 m)	220 lb (100 kg)	Fr	Montreal, Quebec
G	23	Wesley Saunders	6 ft 5 in (1.96 m)	215 lb (98 kg)	So	Los Angeles, California
F	24	Jonah Travis	6 ft 6 in (1.98 m)	225 lb (102 kg)	So	Minneapolis, Minnesota
C	25	Kenyatta Smith	6 ft 8 in (2.03 m)	250 lb (113 kg)	So	Sun Valley, California
F	33	Evan Cummins	6 ft 9 in (2.06 m)	215 lb (98 kg)	Fr	Westborough, Massachusetts
F	34	Tom Hamel	6 ft 9 in (2.06 m)	235 lb (107 kg)	RS Jr	Methuen, Massachusetts
G	35	Agunwa Okolie	6 ft 8 in (2.03 m)	205 lb (93 kg)	Fr	Ajax, Ontario
F	44	Michael Hall	6 ft 10 in (2.08 m)	205 lb (93 kg)	Fr	Atlanta, Georgia

Head coach

- Tommy Amaker (Duke)

Assistant coach(es)

- Brian Adams (Connecticut College)
- Brian DeStefano (Duke)
- Yanni Hufnagel (Cornell)

Legend

- (C) Team captain
- (S) Suspended
- (I) Ineligible
- (W) Walk-on
- Injured
- Current redshirt

Roster

== Preseason ==
Prior to the season, Harvard won all four games on its international training trip to Italy. The team announced that senior Christian Webster and junior Laurent Rivard would serve as captain. The Crimson only returned one starter from the prior year. Harvard's two captains from the prior season, Keith Wright and Oliver McNally were seniors. Wright had been the Ivy League Men's Basketball Player of the Year in 2011. Wright, the Crimson all-time leader in blocked shots, signed with Uppsala Basket of the Swedish Basketball League, and McNally, signed with the Moncton Miracles of the National Basketball League of Canada. The team welcomed five freshmen and ten returning players.

The Ivy League media selected Harvard as the preseason runner-up to Princeton, giving the team the only first place vote that did not go to Princeton. Jeff Goodman of CBS Sports also selected Princeton first and Harvard second with his preseason predictions, noting that Harvard had been his preseason favorite until the September cheating scandal that involved about 125 athletes and students ensnared Kyle Casey and Brandyn Curry, leading to their withdrawal. Casey and Curry had been first-team and second-team All-Ivy selections respectively for the 2011–12 Ivy League men's basketball season, respectively. Both players withdrew from school in hopes of preserving their final year of athletic eligibility following the investigation.

Harvard appeared on 14 televised games in the regular season. Of these 14, six came on the NBC Sports Network. In addition, the team had four games broadcast on four different ESPN networks. Its February 23 game against Yale was televised by CBS Sports.

== Schedule ==
Harvard's November 14 contest against Massachusetts was televised on ESPN as part of the network's Tip-Off Marathon. Harvard lost the contest 67–64. On December 4, the team defeated Boston College for its fifth consecutive victory against Boston College Eagles men's basketball, making Amaker a perfect 6–0 against the Atlantic Coast Conference. The team also defeated cross-town rivals MIT and Boston University as well as in-state rival Holy Cross. Harvard's contest against Columbia that was originally scheduled for February 9 at 7:00 PM at Levien Gymnasium in Manhattan was postponed until February 10 at 2:00 PM due to the February 2013 nor'easter (also known as Winter Storm Nemo).

Harvard had cruised to a 9–1 record in conference play and then fell to 7–2 Princeton on March 1. The following night, Princeton defeated Dartmouth and Harvard lost to Penn to give Princeton the lead in the conference race. Harvard earned the Ivy League Championship with wins on March 8 and 9 over Columbia and Cornell to finish at 11–3 in conference as Princeton was swept on the same nights to Yale and Brown to fall to 9–4 in conference.

On March 21 in the 2013 NCAA tournament, Harvard earned the school's first NCAA tournament victory and its first victory over a top 10 opponent when it defeated number three seeded New Mexico (#10 AP Poll/#10 Coaches' Poll). The victory was the first by an Ivy League team in the tournament since the 2009–10 Cornell Big Red men's basketball team advanced to the Sweet Sixteen. Two days later, the team lost to Arizona, ending its season.

Date time, TV	Rank^{#}	Opponent^{#}	Result	Record	Site (attendance) city, state
Regular season
11/09/2012*; 7:00 pm		MIT	W 69–54	1–0	Lavietes Pavilion (1,755); Cambridge, MA
11/13/2012*; 10:00 am, ESPN		at Massachusetts; ESPN Tip-Off Marathon	L 64–67	1–1	Mullins Center (3,874); Amherst, MA
11/16/2012*; 7:30 pm		Manhattan	W 79–45	2–1	Lavietes Pavilion (1,506); Cambridge, MA
11/20/2012*; 7:30 pm, NBCSN		at Saint Joseph's	L 56–75	2–2	Hagan Arena (3,841); Philadelphia, PA
11/27/2012*; 7:00 pm, NBCSN		Vermont	L 78–85	2–3	Lavietes Pavilion (1,093); Cambridge, MA
12/01/2012*; 1:00 pm		Fordham	W 73–64	3–3	Lavietes Pavilion (1,578); Cambridge, MA
12/04/2012*; 7:00 pm, ESPN3		at Boston College	W 79–63	4–3	Conte Forum (3,128); Chestnut Hill, MA
12/07/2012*; 7:00 pm, SNY		at Connecticut	L 49–57	4–4	Harry A. Gampel Pavilion (9,113); Storrs, CT
12/11/2012*; 7:00 pm		Boston University	W 65–64	5–4	Lavietes Pavilion (1,257); Cambridge, MA
12/22/2012*; 2:00 pm		Holy Cross	W 72–65	6–4	Lavietes Pavilion (1,851); Cambridge, MA
12/29/2012*; 8:00 pm, P12N		at California	W 67–62	7–4	Haas Pavilion (8,334); Berkeley, CA
12/31/2012*; 8:00 pm, ESPN2		at Saint Mary's	L 69–70	7–5	McKeon Pavilion (2,847); Moraga, CA
01/05/2013*; 4:00 pm		Rice	W 92–62	8–5	Lavietes Pavilion (1,722); Cambridge, MA
01/12/2013; 4:00 pm		at Dartmouth	W 75–65	9–5 (1–0)	Leede Arena (997); Hanover, NH
01/19/2013*; 12:30 pm, FSN		at Memphis	L 50–60	9–6	FedExForum (16,204); Memphis
01/26/2013; 2:00 pm, NBCSN		Dartmouth	W 82–77 ^{OT}	10–6 (2–0)	Lavietes Pavilion (1,807); Cambridge, MA
02/01/2013; 7:00 pm		Yale	W 67–64	11–6 (3–0)	Lavietes Pavilion (2,195); Cambridge, MA
02/02/2013; 7:00 pm		Brown	W 89–82 ^{2OT}	12–6 (4–0)	Lavietes Pavilion (1,830); Cambridge, MA
02/08/2013; 7:00 pm		at Cornell	W 67–65	13–6 (5–0)	Newman Arena (2,873); Ithaca, NY
02/10/2013; 2:00 pm		at Columbia	L 63–78	13–7 (5–1)	Levien Gymnasium (1,853); New York City, NY
02/15/2013; 7:00 pm		Penn	W 73–54	14–7 (6–1)	Lavietes Pavilion (2,195); Cambridge, MA
02/16/2013; 7:00 pm, NBCSN		Princeton	W 69–57	15–7 (7–1)	Lavietes Pavilion (2,195); Cambridge, MA
02/22/2013; 7:00 pm		at Brown	W 65–47	16–7 (8–1)	Pizzitola Sports Center (1,321); Providence, RI
02/23/2013; 8:00 pm, CBSSN		at Yale	W 72–66	17–7 (9–1)	John J. Lee Amphitheater (2,139); New Haven, CT
03/01/2013; 7:00 pm, ESPNU		at Princeton	L 53–58	17–8 (9–2)	Jadwin Gymnasium (4,413); Princeton, NJ
03/02/2013; 6:00 pm, NBCSN		at Penn	L 72–75	17–9 (9–3)	Palestra (5,267); Philadelphia, PA
03/08/2013; 7:00 pm		Columbia	W 56–51	18–9 (10–3)	Lavietes Pavilion (1,825); Cambridge, MA
03/09/2013; 5:30 pm, NBCSN		Cornell	W 65–56	19–9 (11–3)	Lavietes Pavilion (2,195); Cambridge, MA
2013 NCAA Tournament
03/21/2013*; 10:10 pm, TNT	(14 W)	vs. (3 W) No. 11 New Mexico; Second Round	W 68–62	20–9	EnergySolutions Arena (14,345); Salt Lake City, UT
03/23/2013*; 6:10 pm, TNT	(14 W)	vs. (6 W) Arizona; Third Round	L 51–74	20–10	EnergySolutions Arena (16,060); Salt Lake City, UT
*Non-conference game. ^{#}Rankings from AP Poll. (#) Tournament seedings in parentheses. All times are in Eastern Time(#) during NCAA Tournament is seed with Region W=West.

N.B. Source:

=== In season ===
Each week the Ivy League selects a player of the week and a rookie of the week. Led by Wesley Saunders' 5 Ivy League Player of the Week Awards and Siyani Chambers' 6 Rookie of the Week Awards, Harvard tied the Ivy League record with 13 single-season weekly recognitions.

	Player of the Week				Rookie of the Week		
	Name	School	Class	Position	Name	School	Position
December 3, 2012	Wesley Saunders	Harvard	So.	G/F	Siyani Chambers	Harvard	G
December 10, 2012	Wesley Saunders	Harvard	So.	G/F			
December 17, 2012					Siyani Chambers	Harvard	G
January 7, 2013					Siyani Chambers	Harvard	G
January 14, 2013	Wesley Saunders	Harvard	So.	G/F	Siyani Chambers	Harvard	G
January 28, 2013	Christian Webster	Harvard	Sr.	G	Siyani Chambers	Harvard	G
February 4, 2013	Wesley Saunders	Harvard	So.	G/F			
February 18, 2013	Kenyatta Smith	Harvard	So.	C			
February 25, 2013	Wesley Saunders	Harvard	So.	G/F			
March 10, 2013					Siyani Chambers	Harvard	G

=== All-Ivy ===
Siyani Chambers was named the unanimous choice for Ivy League Rookie of the Year and the first freshman to be first team All-Ivy. Chambers and Saunders were the first Harvard teammates selected together as first team All-Ivy. The following players earned Ivy League postseason recognition:

First Team All-Ivy

- ^Wesley Saunders, (So., G/F - Los Angeles)
- Siyani Chambers, (Fr., G - Golden Valley, Minn.)

Honorable Mention All-Ivy

- Steve Moundou-Missi, (So., F - Yaounde, Cameroon)
- Laurent Rivard, (Jr., G - Saint-Bruno-de-Montarville, Québec, Canada)

^Unanimous Selection

On March 12, the U.S. Basketball Writers Association named Saunders to its 2012–13 Men's All-District I (ME, VT, NH, RI, MA, CT) Team, based upon voting from its national membership. The National Association of Basketball Coaches announced their Division I All-District teams on March 26, recognizing the nation's best men's collegiate basketball student-athletes. Selected and voted on by member coaches of the NABC, 240 student-athletes, from 24 districts were chosen. The selections on this list were then eligible for the State Farm Coaches' Division I All-America teams. Saunders and Chambers were among the District 13 first team selections.
