= At All Costs =

At All Costs may refer to:

- At All Costs (Weber novel), a 2005 novel by David Weber
- At All Costs (Nancy Drew/Hardy Boys novel), 1997
- At All Costs (film), a 2016 documentary film

== See also ==
- At All Cost, an American metalcore band
- At Any Price, a 2012 film
