= 2012–13 Penn Quakers men's basketball team =

American college basketball season

2012–13 Penn Quakers men's basketball
- Conference: Ivy League
- Record: 9–22 (6–8 Ivy)
- Head coach: Jerome Allen (4th season)
- Assistant coaches: Scott Pera; Ira Bowman; Jason Polykoff
- Home arena: The Palestra

2012–13 Ivy League men's basketball standings
	Conf.				Overall
Team	W		L	PCT	W		L	PCT
x-Harvard	11	–	3	.786	20	–	10	.667
Princeton	10	–	4	.714	17	–	11	.607
Yale	8	–	6	.571	14	–	17	.452
Brown	7	–	7	.500	13	–	15	.464
Penn	6	–	8	.429	9	–	22	.290
Cornell	5	–	9	.357	13	–	18	.419
Dartmouth	5	–	9	.357	9	–	19	.321
Columbia	4	–	10	.286	12	–	16	.429
As of March 23, 2013; Rankings from AP Poll x-Ivy League champion

The 2012–13 Penn Quakers men's basketball team represented the University of Pennsylvania during the 2011–12 NCAA Division I men's basketball season. The Quakers, led by fourth-year head coach Jerome Allen, played their home games at The Palestra and were members of the Ivy League. They finished the season 9–22, 6–8 in Ivy League play to finish in fifth place.

== Previous season ==
The Quakers won 20 games for the first time in five years. This gave them 1,697 wins in the program's history, 10th among all NCAA Division I programs. They were in contention to win the Ivy League, and advanced to the CBI quarterfinals for the first time since 2007.

== Offseason ==
Name	Number	Pos.	Height	Weight	Year	Hometown	Reason for departure
Zack Rosen	1	G	6'3"	175	Senior	Colonia, NJ	Graduated
Rob Belcore	34	G	6'6"	224	Senior	Lake Forest, IL	Graduated
Tyler Bernardini	4	G	6'6"	210	Senior	Carlsbad, CA	Graduated

== Roster ==
Number	Name	Position	Height	Weight	Year	Hometown
0	Miles Jackson-Cartwright	Guard	6–3	175	Junior	Van Nuys, California
1	Tony Hicks	Guard	6–2	170	Freshman	South Holland, Illinois
2	Simeon Esprit	Guard	6–6	175	Sophomore	London, England
3	Henry Brooks	Forward	6–8	215	Sophomore	Fairburn, Georgia
4	Jamal Lewis	Guard	6–0	160	Freshman	Springdale, Maryland
5	Julian Harrell	Forward	6–5	195	Freshman	Los Angeles, California
10	Darien Nelson-Henry	Center	6–11	265	Freshman	Kirkland, Washington
12	Fran Dougherty	Forward	6–8	225	Junior	New Britain, Pennsylvania
14	Keelan Cairns	Forward	6–10	210	Sophomore	Belfast, Northern Ireland
15	Camryn Crocker	Guard	6–3	170	Sophomore	Cypress, California
20	Dau Jok	Guard	6–4	180	Junior	Des Moines, Iowa
21	Cameron Gunter	Forward/Center	6–9	205	Junior	Morton, Pennsylvania
22	Steve Rennard	Guard	6–2	175	Junior	Hazlet, New Jersey
23	Greg Louis	Forward	6–7	215	Sophomore	West Palm Beach, Florida
30	Patrick Lucas-Perry	Guard	5–11	165	Sophomore	Grand Blanc, Michigan

== Schedule ==
Date time, TV	Rank^{#}	Opponent^{#}	Result	Record	Site (attendance) city, state
Regular season
11/09/2012*; 7:00 pm		UMBC	W 80–75	1–0	The Palestra (3,605); Philadelphia, PA
11/12/2012*; 9:30 pm		vs. Delaware; NIT Season Tip-Off First Round	L 69–84	1–1	John Paul Jones Arena (8,568); Charlottesville, VA
11/13/2012*; 4:30 pm		vs. Fairfield; NIT Season Tip-Off loser bracket	L 53–62	1–2	John Paul Jones Arena (8,490); Charlottesville, VA
11/17/2012*; 4:00 pm		Drexel	L 59–61	1–3	The Palestra (5,608); Philadelphia, PA
11/19/2012*; 6:00 pm		vs. Fordham; NIT Season Tip-Off Consolation game	L 68–70	1–4	Stabler Arena (540); Bethlehem, PA
11/20/2012*; 8:30 pm		at Lehigh; NIT Season Tip-Off Consolation game	L 66–73	1–5	Stabler Arena (829); Bethlehem, PA
11/28/2012*; 7:00 pm		Binghamton	W 65–54	2–5	The Palestra (2,712); Philadelphia, PA
12/01/2012*; 2:00 pm, ESPN3		at Penn State	L 47–58	2–6	Bryce Jordan Center (3,982); University Park, PA
12/08/2012*; 8:00 pm, NBCSN		Villanova	L 55–68	2–7	The Palestra (6,413); Philadelphia, PA
12/21/2012*; 7:00 pm		at Delaware	L 60–83	2–8	Bob Carpenter Center (2,018); Newark, DE
12/29/2012*; 4:00 pm		at Wagner	L 63–68 ^{OT}	2–9	Spiro Sports Center (1,234); Staten Island, NY
01/02/2013*; 7:00 pm		at No. 17 Butler	L 57–70	2–10	Hinkle Fieldhouse (6,406); Indianapolis, IN
01/05/2013*; 2:00 pm		at La Salle	L 57–74	2–11	Tom Gola Arena (2,422); Philadelphia, PA
01/08/2013*; 7:30 pm		Lafayette	L 83–85	2–12	The Palestra (2,805); Philadelphia, PA
01/12/2013; 6:00 pm, NBCSN		at Princeton; Rivalry	L 53–65	2–13 (0–1)	Jadwin Gymnasium (3,577); Princeton, NJ
01/17/2013*; 7:30 pm		at NJIT	W 54–53	3–13	Fleisher Center (455); Newark, NJ
01/19/2013*; 5:00 pm, ESPNU		vs. Saint Joseph's	L 59–79	3–14	The Palestra (8,722); Philadelphia, PA
01/23/2013*; 7:00 pm		at Temple	L 69–76	3–15	Liacouras Center (6,731); Philadelphia, PA
02/01/2013; 7:00 pm		Columbia	W 62–58	4–15 (1–1)	The Palestra (2,403); Philadelphia, PA
02/02/2013; 7:00 pm		Cornell	L 69–71	4–16 (1–2)	The Palestra (3,604); Philadelphia, PA
02/08/2013; 7:00 pm		Yale	L 59–68	4–17 (1–3)	The Palestra (2,810); Philadelphia, PA
02/09/2013; 7:00 pm		Brown	W 71–48	5–17 (2–3)	The Palestra (3,103); Philadelphia, PA
02/15/2013; 7:00 pm		at Harvard	L 54–73	5–18 (2–4)	Lavietes Pavilion (2,195); Boston, MA
02/16/2013; 7:00 pm		at Dartmouth	W 67–57	6–18 (3–4)	Leede Arena (889); Hanover, NH
02/22/2013; 7:00 pm		at Cornell	W 79–71	7–18 (4–4)	Newman Arena (2,489); Ithaca, NY
02/23/2013; 7:00 pm		at Columbia	L 41–58	7–19 (4–5)	Levien Gymnasium (2,025); New York City, NY
03/01/2013; 7:00 pm		at Dartmouth	L 64–69	7–20 (4–6)	Levien Gymnasium (1,867); New York City, NY
03/02/2013; 6:00 pm, NBCSN		Harvard	W 75–72	8–20 (5–6)	The Palestra (5,267); Philadelphia, PA
03/08/2013; 7:00 pm		at Brown	W 66–64	9–20 (6–6)	Pizzitola Sports Center (1,324); Providence, RI
03/09/2013; 7:00 pm		at Yale	L 65–79	9–21 (6–7)	John J. Lee Amphitheater (1,762); New Haven, CT
03/12/2013; 7:30 pm		Princeton; Rivalry	L 58–71	9–22 (6–8)	The Palestra (4,814); Philadelphia, PA
*Non-conference game. ^{#}Rankings from AP Poll. (#) Tournament seedings in parentheses. All times are in Eastern Time.
