= 2012–13 Cornell Big Red men's basketball team =

American college basketball season

2012–13 Cornell Big Red men's basketball
- Conference: Ivy League
- Record: 13–18 (5–9 Ivy)
- Head coach: Bill Courtney (3rd season)
- Assistant coaches: Marlon Sears; Mike Blaine; Arlen Galloway
- Home arena: Newman Arena

2012–13 Ivy League men's basketball standings
	Conf.				Overall
Team	W		L	PCT	W		L	PCT
x-Harvard	11	–	3	.786	20	–	10	.667
Princeton	10	–	4	.714	17	–	11	.607
Yale	8	–	6	.571	14	–	17	.452
Brown	7	–	7	.500	13	–	15	.464
Penn	6	–	8	.429	9	–	22	.290
Cornell	5	–	9	.357	13	–	18	.419
Dartmouth	5	–	9	.357	9	–	19	.321
Columbia	4	–	10	.286	12	–	16	.429
As of March 23, 2013; Rankings from AP Poll x-Ivy League champion

The 2012–13 Cornell Big Red men's basketball team represented Cornell University during the 2012–13 NCAA Division I men's basketball season. The Bid Red, led by third year head coach Bill Courtney, played their home games at Newman Arena and were members of the Ivy League.

They finished the season 13–18, 5–9 in Ivy League play to finish in a tie for sixth place.

== Roster ==
Number	Name	Position	Height	Weight	Year	Hometown
1	Galal Cancer	Guard	6–2	178	Sophomore	Albany, New York
3	Nolan Cressler	Guard	6–4	200	Freshman	Pittsburgh, Pennsylvania
4	Dave LaMore	Forward/Center	6–9	228	Sophomore	Whitmore Lake, Michigan
11	Robert Mischler	Guard	6–3	190	Freshman	Mishawaka, Indiana
12	Dominick Scelfo	Guard	6–3	179	Junior	Kenner, Louisiana
13	Errick Peck	Forward	6–6	224	Senior	Indianapolis, Indiana
15	Braxston Bunce	Center	6–11	250	Freshman	Kelowna, Canada
20	Jake Matthews	Guard	6–2	155	Junior	Greensburg, Pennsylvania
21	Peter McMillan	Forward	6–7	203	Senior	Brentwood, California
22	Miles Asafo-Adjei	Guard	6–2	170	Senior	Antioch, Tennessee
23	Johnathan Gray	Guard	6–3	184	Senior	Tampa, Florida
24	Devin Cherry	Guard	6–3	180	Sophomore	Meridian, Mississippi
25	Jamal Cherry	Guard	6–4	190	Junior	Tampa, Florida
30	Holt Harmon	Forward	6–9	240	Freshman	Plano, Texas
32	Shonn Miller	Forward	6–7	202	Sophomore	Euclid, Ohio
33	Dwight Tarwater	Forward	6–6	223	Junior	Knoxville, Tennessee
34	Josh Figini	Forward	6–9	215	Senior	Chisago Lakes, Minnesota
35	Nenad Tomic	Forward	6–7	248	Sophomore	North Royalton, Ohio
50	Deion Giddens	Forward/Center	6–9	192	Sophomore	Bitburg, Germany
55	Eitan Chemerinski	Forward	6–8	218	Senior	Potomac, Maryland

== Schedule ==
Date time, TV	Rank^{#}	Opponent^{#}	Result	Record	Site (attendance) city, state
Regular Season
11/10/2012*; 12:00 pm		Western Michigan	W 63–55	1–0	Newman Arena (N/A); Ithaca, NY
11/14/2012*; 7:00 pm, NBCSN		St. Bonaventure	L 68–72	1–1	Newman Arena (3,016); Ithaca, NY
11/16/2012*; 7:00 pm		Saint Peter's	L 64–68	1–2	Newman Arena (1,417); Ithaca, NY
11/18/2012*; 6:00 pm, ESPN3		at No. 22 Wisconsin; Las Vegas Invitational	L 40–73	1–3	Kohl Center (16,657); Madison, WI
11/20/2012*; 9:00 pm, P12N		at Arizona State; Las Vegas Invitational	L 53–64	1–4	Wells Fargo Arena (4,595); Tempe, AZ
11/23/2012*; 4:30 pm		vs. Presbyterian; Las Vegas Invitational	W 89–55	2–4	Orleans Arena (200); Paradise, NV
11/24/2012*; 5:30 pm		vs. Longwood; Las Vegas Invitational	W 84–78	3–4	Orleans Arena (200); Paradise, NV
11/28/2012*; 7:00 pm		Stony Brook	L 53–76	3–5	Newman Arena (1,816); Ithaca, NY
12/01/2012*; 4:00 pm		Colgate	W 70–63	4–5	Newman Arena (1,864); Ithaca, NY
12/17/2012*; 9:00 pm, ESPNU		at Vanderbilt	L 55–66	4–6	Memorial Gymnasium (9,716); Nashville, TN
12/19/2012*; 7:00 pm, ESPNU		at No. 1 Duke	L 47–88	4–7	Cameron Indoor Stadium (9,314); Durham, NC
12/22/2012*; 1:00 pm		at Boston University	L 57–70	4–8	Case Gym (715); Boston, MA
12/28/2012*; 7:00 pm		at Saint Francis (PA)	W 79–67	5–8	DeGol Arena (627); Loretto, PA
12/30/2012*; 2:00 pm, TWCS		at Binghamton	W 79–77	6–8	Binghamton University Events Center (3,673); Vestal, NY
01/02/2013*; 7:00 pm		Bucknell	L 56–72	6–9	Newman Arena (1,471); Ithaca, NY
01/06/2013*; 2:00 pm		at American	W 68–60	7–9	Bender Arena (1,290); Washington, D.C.
01/12/2013*; 2:00 pm		SUNY Old Westbury	W 103–84	8–9	Newman Arena (1,974); Ithaca, NY
01/19/2013; 3:00 pm, NBCSN		Columbia	L 58–67	8–10 (0–1)	Newman Arena (3,717); Ithaca, NY
01/26/2013; 7:00 pm		at Columbia	W 66–63	9–10 (1–1)	Levien Gymnasium (2,583); New York City, NY
02/01/2013; 7:00 pm		at Princeton	L 59–76	9–11 (1–2)	Jadwin Gymnasium (2,087); Princeton, NJ
02/02/2013; 7:00 pm		at Penn	W 71–69	10–11 (2–2)	Palestra (3,604); Philadelphia, PA
02/08/2013; 7:00 pm		Harvard	L 65–67	10–12 (2–3)	Newman Arena (2,873); Ithaca, NY
02/10/2013; 12:00 pm		Dartmouth	W 79–56	11–12 (3–3)	Newman Arena (1,978); Ithaca, NY
02/15/2013; 7:00 pm		at Yale	W 68–61	12–12 (4–3)	John J. Lee Amphitheater (1,173); New Haven, CT
02/16/2013; 6:00 pm		at Brown	W 69–66	13–12 (5–3)	Pizzitola Sports Center (828); Providence, RI
02/22/2013; 7:00 pm		Penn	L 71–79	13–13 (5–4)	Newman Arena (2,489); Ithaca, NY
02/23/2013; 7:00 pm		Princeton	L 53–72	13–14 (5–5)	Newman Arena (2,694); Ithaca, NY
03/01/2013; 7:00 pm		Brown	L 65–84	13–15 (5–6)	Newman Arena (1,812); Ithaca, NY
03/02/2013; 7:00 pm		Yale	L 70–79	13–16 (5–7)	Newman Arena (2,150); Ithaca, NY
03/08/2013; 7:00 pm		at Dartmouth	L 62–76	13–17 (5–8)	Leede Arena (690); Hanover, NH
03/09/2013; 5:30 pm, NBCSN		at Harvard	L 56–65	13–18 (5–9)	Lavietes Pavilion (2,195); Boston, MA
*Non-conference game. ^{#}Rankings from AP Poll. (#) Tournament seedings in parentheses. All times are in Eastern Time.
