= 2012–13 Columbia Lions men's basketball team =

American college basketball season

2012–13 Columbia Lions men's basketball
- Conference: Ivy League
- Record: 12–16 (4–10 Ivy)
- Head coach: Kyle Smith (3rd season)
- Assistant coaches: Carlin Hartman; Kevin Hovde; Mike Magpayo
- Home arena: Levien Gymnasium

2012–13 Ivy League men's basketball standings
	Conf.				Overall
Team	W		L	PCT	W		L	PCT
x-Harvard	11	–	3	.786	20	–	10	.667
Princeton	10	–	4	.714	17	–	11	.607
Yale	8	–	6	.571	14	–	17	.452
Brown	7	–	7	.500	13	–	15	.464
Penn	6	–	8	.429	9	–	22	.290
Cornell	5	–	9	.357	13	–	18	.419
Dartmouth	5	–	9	.357	9	–	19	.321
Columbia	4	–	10	.286	12	–	16	.429
As of March 23, 2013; Rankings from AP Poll x-Ivy League champion

The 2012–13 Columbia Lions men's basketball team represented Columbia University during the 2012–13 NCAA Division I men's basketball season. The Lions, led by third year head coach Kyle Smith, played their home games at Levien Gymnasium and were members of the Ivy League.

They finished the season 12–16, 4–10 in Ivy League play to finish in last place.

== Roster ==
Number	Name	Position	Height	Weight	Year	Hometown
2	Isaac Cohen	Guard	6–4	210	Freshman	Orlando, Florida
3	Grant Mullins	Guard	6–3	175	Freshman	Burlington, Canada
4	Dean Kowalski	Guard	5–10	165	Senior	Westfield, New Jersey
5	Steve Frankoski	Guard	6–2	175	Sophomore	Florham Park, New Jersey
10	Brian Barbour	Guard	6–1	175	Senior	Alamo, California
11	Zach En'Wezoh	Forward	6–8	220	Freshman	Kennewick, Washington
12	Maodo Lo	Guard	6–3	180	Freshman	Berlin, Germany
13	Alex Rosenberg	Forward	6–7	215	Sophomore	Short Hills, New Jersey
15	John Daniels	Forward	6–8	220	Senior	Sioux City, Iowa
20	Paddy Quinn	Guard	6–1	175	Freshman	Ramsey, New Jersey
21	Noah Springwater	Guard	6–3	175	Sophomore	San Francisco, California
22	Meiko Lyles	Guard	6–3	190	Junior	Nashville, Tennessee
23	Cory Osetkowski	Center	6–11	258	Sophomore	Rancho Santa Fe, California
24	Van Green	Guard	6–3	185	Junior	Birmingham, Alabama
25	Samer Ozeir	Forward	6–8	205	Sophomore	Novi, Michigan
33	Skylar Scrivano	Forward	6–9	220	Sophomore	Holicong, Pennsylvania
35	Brad Gilson	Forward	6–6	195	Freshman	Round Hill, Virginia
55	Mark Cisco	Center	6–9	245	Senior	Chester, New Jersey

== Schedule ==
Date time, TV	Rank^{#}	Opponent^{#}	Result	Record	Site (attendance) city, state
Regular Season
11/10/2012*; 7:00 pm		at Furman	W 68–47	1–0	Timmons Arena (702); Greenville, SC
11/13/2012*; 7:30 pm		Haverford	W 74–40	2–0	Levien Gymnasium (534); New York City, NY
11/17/2012*; 7:00 pm		Marist	L 62–67	2–1	Levien Gymnasium (1,265); New York City, NY
11/20/2012*; 7:00 pm, ESPN3		at Villanova	W 75–57	3–1	The Pavilion (6,500); Villanova, PA
11/23/2012*; 9:00 pm		vs. Wayland Baptist; San Francisco Hilltop Challenge	W 75–63	4–1	War Memorial Gymnasium (350); San Francisco, CA
11/24/2012*; 10:00 pm		at San Francisco; San Francisco Hilltop Challenge	L 59–79	4–2	War Memorial Gymnasium (1,027); San Francisco, CA
11/28/2012*; 7:00 pm		at Long Island	L 61–70	4–3	Athletic, Recreation & Wellness Center (843); Brooklyn, NY
12/01/2012*; 7:00 pm		Bucknell	L 57–65	4–4	Levien Gymnasium (N/A); New York City, NY
12/09/2012*; 2:00 pm		at American	W 54–42	5–4	Bender Arena (717); Washington, D.C.
12/22/2012*; 4:00 pm		Elon	L 69–70	5–5	Levien Gymnasium (1,053); New York City, NY
12/29/2012*; 4:00 pm		Manhattan	W 69–58	6–5	Levien Gymnasium (1,026); New York City, NY
01/02/2013*; 7:00 pm		Colgate	W 66–59	7–5	Levien Gymnasium (881); New York City, NY
01/05/2013*; 3:00 pm		at Army	W 64–52	8–5	Christl Arena (1,507); West Point, NY
01/08/2013*; 7:00 pm		at Holy Cross	L 69–78	8–6	Hart Center (1,011); Worcester, MA
01/19/2013; 3:00 pm, NBCSN		at Cornell	W 67–58	9–6 (1–0)	Newman Arena (3,717); Ithaca, NY
01/26/2013; 7:00 pm		Cornell	L 63–66	9–7 (1–1)	Levien Gymnasium (2,583); New York City, NY
02/01/2013; 7:00 pm		at Penn	L 58–62	9–8 (1–2)	Palestra (2,403); Philadelphia, PA
02/02/2013; 6:00 pm, NBCSN		at Princeton	L 66–72	9–9 (1–3)	Jadwin Gymnasium (3,180); Princeton, NJ
02/08/2013; 7:00 pm		Dartmouth	L 57–60	9–10 (1–4)	Levien Gymnasium (1,016); New York City, NY
02/10/2013; 2:00 pm		Harvard	W 78–63	10–10 (2–4)	Levien Gymnasium (1,853); New York City, NY
02/15/2013; 7:00 pm		at Brown	L 55–58	10–11 (2–5)	Pizzitola Sports Center (1,417); Providence, RI
02/16/2013; 7:00 pm		at Yale	L 56–75	10–12 (2–6)	John J. Lee Amphitheater (1,426); New Haven, CT
02/22/2013; 7:00 pm		Princeton	L 40–65	10–13 (2–7)	Levien Gymnasium (2,119); New York City, NY
02/23/2013; 7:00 pm		Penn	W 58–41	11–13 (3–7)	Levien Gymnasium (2,025); New York City, NY
03/01/2013; 7:00 pm		Yale	W 59–46	12–13 (4–7)	Levien Gymnasium (2,022); New York City, NY
03/02/2013; 7:00 pm		Brown	L 58–61	12–14 (4–8)	Levien Gymnasium (2,166); New York City, NY
03/08/2013; 7:00 pm		at Harvard	L 51–56	12–15 (4–9)	Lavietes Pavilion (1,825); Boston, MA
03/09/2013; 7:00 pm		at Dartmouth	L 58–64	12–16 (4–10)	Leede Arena (779); Hanover, NH
*Non-conference game. ^{#}Rankings from AP Poll. (#) Tournament seedings in parentheses. All times are in Eastern Time.
