= 2012–13 Yale Bulldogs men's basketball team =

American college basketball season

2012–13 Yale Bulldogs men's basketball
- Conference: Ivy League
- Record: 14–17 (8–6 Ivy)
- Head coach: James Jones (14th season)
- Assistant coaches: Matt Kingsley; Jamie Snyder-Fair; Justin Simon
- Home arena: John J. Lee Amphitheater

2012–13 Ivy League men's basketball standings
	Conf.				Overall
Team	W		L	PCT	W		L	PCT
x-Harvard	11	–	3	.786	20	–	10	.667
Princeton	10	–	4	.714	17	–	11	.607
Yale	8	–	6	.571	14	–	17	.452
Brown	7	–	7	.500	13	–	15	.464
Penn	6	–	8	.429	9	–	22	.290
Cornell	5	–	9	.357	13	–	18	.419
Dartmouth	5	–	9	.357	9	–	19	.321
Columbia	4	–	10	.286	12	–	16	.429
As of March 23, 2013; Rankings from AP Poll x-Ivy League champion

The 2012–13 Yale Bulldogs men's basketball team represented Yale University during the 2012–13 NCAA Division I men's basketball season. The Bulldogs, led by 14th year head coach James Jones, played their home games at John J. Lee Amphitheater of the Payne Whitney Gymnasium and were members of the Ivy League.

They finished the season 14–17, 8–6 in Ivy League play to finish in third place.

== Roster ==
Number	Name	Position	Height	Weight	Year	Hometown
1	Austin Morgan	Guard	5–11	190	Senior	Reno, Nevada
3	Will Bartlett	Forward	6–7	210	Junior	New York City, New York
4	Jack Montague	Guard	6–0	170	Freshman	Brentwood, Tennessee
5	Michael Grace	Guard	6–0	180	Senior	Winston-Salem, North Carolina
10	Khaliq Bedart Ghani	Guard	6–5	205	Freshman	Inglewood, California
11	Jesse Pritchard	Guard	6–5	210	Junior	Ames, Iowa
12	Armani Cotton	Guard	6–7	215	Sophomore	New York City, New York
20	Javier Duren	Guard	6–4	185	Sophomore	St. Louis, Missouri
21	Nick Victor	Guard	6–5	205	Freshman	Dallas, Texas
22	Justin Sears	Forward	6–8	205	Senior	Plainfield, New Jersey
25	Sam Martin	Guard	6–3	200	Senior	West Warwick, Rhode Island
32	Greg Kelley	Forward	6–8	215	Junior	Newton, Massachusetts
34	Will Childs-Klein	Center	6–11	225	Sophomore	St. Louis, Missouri
35	Brandon Sherrod	Forward	6–6	230	Sophomore	Bridgeport, Connecticut
42	Matt Townsend	Forward	6–7	240	Sophomore	Chappaqua, New York
50	Jeremiah Kreisberg	Center/Forward	6–10	240	Junior	Berkeley, California

== Schedule ==
Date time, TV	Rank^{#}	Opponent^{#}	Result	Record	Site (attendance) city, state
Regular Season
11/10/2012*; 5:30 pm		vs. Sacred Heart; Connecticut 6 Classic	L 82–85 ^{OT}	0–1	Chase Arena at Reich Family Pavilion (N/A); Hartford, CT
11/12/2012*; 7:00 pm		at Saint Joseph's	L 35–61	0–2	Hagan Arena (4,120); Philadelphia, PA
11/16/2012*; 8:30 pm		at Evansville; Coaches Vs. Cancer Classic	L 56–66	0–3	Ford Center (4,112); Evansville, IN
11/17/2012*; 7:30 pm		vs. Buffalo; Coaches Vs. Cancer Classic	W 63–59	1–3	Ford Center (4,431); Evansville, IN
11/18/2012*; 3:00 pm		vs. Western Illinois; Coaches Vs. Cancer Classic	L 47–59	1–4	Johnson Center (428); Oakland City, IN
11/21/2012*; 7:00 pm		at Vermont	L 52–65	1–5	Patrick Gym (2,403); Burlington, VT
11/24/2012*; 2:00 pm		Army	W 86–83 ^{2OT}	2–5	John J. Lee Amphitheater (1,116); New Haven, CT
11/29/2012*; 7:00 pm		Hartford	L 51–60	2–6	John J. Lee Amphitheater (582); New Haven, CT
12/05/2012*; 7:00 pm		at Bryant	W 64–62	3–6	Chace Athletic Center (1,492); Smithfield, RI
12/08/2012*; 1:00 pm		at New Hampshire	L 56–64	3–7	Lundholm Gym (653); Durham, NH
12/18/2012*; 7:00 pm		Albertus Magnus	W 112–63	4–7	John J. Lee Amphitheater (1,094); New Haven, CT
12/28/2012*; 10:00 pm		at Nevada	L 75–85	4–8	Lawlor Events Center (7,226); Reno, NV
12/30/2012*; 5:30 pm		at Saint Mary's	L 62–78	4–9	McKeon Pavilion (2,814); Moraga, CA
01/01/2013*; 1:00 pm		at Iowa State	L 70–80	4–10	Hilton Coliseum (12,548); Ames, IA
01/04/2013*; 7:00 pm		at Holy Cross	W 61–54	5–10	Hart Center (1,474); Worcester, MA
01/06/2013*; 5:30 pm, NBCSN		No. 13 Florida	L 58–79	5–11	John J. Lee Amphitheater (2,532); New Haven, CT
01/12/2013*; 2:00 pm		Oberlin	W 104–39	6–11	John J. Lee Amphitheater (1,006); New Haven, CT
01/19/2013; 7:00 pm		at Brown	L 51–65	6–12 (0–1)	Pizzitola Sports Center (1,215); Providence, RI
01/26/2013; 2:00 pm		Brown	W 76–64 ^{OT}	7–12 (1–1)	John J. Lee Amphitheater (1,684); New Haven, CT
02/01/2013; 7:00 pm		at Harvard	L 64–67	7–13 (1–2)	Lavietes Pavilion (2,195); Cambridge, MA
02/02/2013; 7:00 pm		at Dartmouth	L 62–71	7–14 (1–3)	Leede Arena (1,007); Hanover, NH
02/08/2013; 7:00 pm		at Penn	W 68–59	8–14 (2–3)	The Palestra (2,810); Philadelphia, PA
02/09/2013; 6:00 pm		at Princeton	W 69–65	9–14 (3–3)	Jadwin Gymnasium (2,975); Princeton, NJ
02/15/2013; 7:00 pm		Cornell	L 61–68	9–15 (3–4)	John J. Lee Amphitheater (1,173); New Haven, CT
02/16/2013; 7:00 pm		Columbia	W 75–56	10–15 (4–4)	John J. Lee Amphitheater (1,426); New Haven, CT
02/22/2013; 7:00 pm		Dartmouth	W 78–67	11–15 (5–4)	John J. Lee Amphitheater (1,207); New Haven, CT
02/23/2013; 8:00 pm, CBSSN		Harvard	L 66–72	11–16 (5–5)	John J. Lee Amphitheater (2,139); New Haven, CT
03/01/2013; 7:00 pm		at Columbia	L 46–59	11–17 (5–6)	Levien Gymnasium (2,022); New York City, NY
03/02/2013; 7:00 pm		at Cornell	W 79–70	12–17 (6–6)	Newman Arena (2,150); Ithaca, NY
03/08/2013; 7:00 pm		Princeton	W 71–66	13–17 (7–6)	John J. Lee Amphitheater (1,519); New Haven, CT
03/09/2013; 7:00 pm		Penn	W 79–65	14–17 (8–6)	John J. Lee Amphitheater (1,762); New Haven, CT
*Non-conference game. ^{#}Rankings from AP Poll. (#) Tournament seedings in parentheses. All times are in Eastern Time.
