= 2012–13 Brown Bears men's basketball team =

American college basketball season

2012–13 Brown Bears men's basketball
- Conference: Ivy League
- Record: 13–15 (7–7 Ivy)
- Head coach: Mike Martin (1st season)
- Assistant coaches: T. J. Sorrentine; Dwayne Pina; Kevin Snyder
- Home arena: Pizzitola Sports Center

2012–13 Ivy League men's basketball standings
	Conf.				Overall
Team	W		L	PCT	W		L	PCT
x-Harvard	11	–	3	.786	20	–	10	.667
Princeton	10	–	4	.714	17	–	11	.607
Yale	8	–	6	.571	14	–	17	.452
Brown	7	–	7	.500	13	–	15	.464
Penn	6	–	8	.429	9	–	22	.290
Cornell	5	–	9	.357	13	–	18	.419
Dartmouth	5	–	9	.357	9	–	19	.321
Columbia	4	–	10	.286	12	–	16	.429
As of March 23, 2013; Rankings from AP Poll x-Ivy League champion

The 2012–13 Brown Bears men's basketball team represented Brown University during the 2011–12 NCAA Division I men's basketball season. The Bears, led by first year head coach Mike Martin, played their home games at the Pizzitola Sports Center and were members of the Ivy League.

They finished the season 13–15, 7–7 in Ivy League play to finish in fourth place.

== Roster ==
Number	Name	Position	Height	Weight	Year	Hometown
1	Longji Yiljep	Guard	6–5	185	Sophomore	Sanaru-Zaria, Nigeria
11	Joe Sharkey	Guard	6–2	190	Sophomore	Norwood, Massachusetts
13	Tyler Ponticelli	Forward	6–8	220	Senior	Northbrook, Illinois
14	Matt Sullivan	Guard	6–5	205	Senior	Wilmette, Illinois
21	Cedric Kuakumensah	Forward	6–8	245	Freshman	Worcester, Massachusetts
22	Sean McGonagill	Guard	6–1	180	Junior	Brookfield, Illinois
25	Eddie Fitzpatrick	Forward	6–6	180	Sophomore	North Attleboro, Massachusetts
32	Stephen Albrecht	Guard	6–3	175	Senior	Crown Point, Indiana
33	Tucker Halpern	Forward	6–8	220	Junior	Brookline, Massachusetts
45	Rafael Maia	Center	6–9	230	Sophomore	São Paulo, Brazil
50	Jon Schmidt	Forward	6–7	210	Sophomore	Baltimore, Maryland

== Schedule ==
Date time, TV	Rank^{#}	Opponent^{#}	Result	Record	Site (attendance) city, state
Regular Season
11/11/2012*; 2:00 pm		at Binghamton	W 58–49	1–0	Binghamton University Events Center (2,075); Vestal, NY
11/15/2012*; 7:30 pm		at Central Connecticut	L 71–86	1–1	William H. Detrick Gymnasium (2,214); New Britain, CT
11/17/2012*; 7:00 pm		at Maine	W 70–68	2–1	Alfond Arena (N/A); Orono, ME
11/21/2012*; 7:00 pm		Bryant	L 61–68	2–2	Pizzitola Sports Center (1,509); Providence, RI
11/24/2012*; 2:00 pm		St. Francis (NY)	L 72–76 ^{OT}	2–3	Pizzitola Sports Center (N/A); Providence, RI
11/29/2012*; 7:00 pm		Sacred Heart	W 69–56	3–3	Pizzitola Sports Center (529); Providence, RI
12/01/2012*; 1:00 pm, WBIN		at New Hampshire	L 50–63	3–4	Lundholm Gym (602); Durham, NH
12/08/2012*; 7:00 pm, ESPN3		at No. 22 Notre Dame	L 57–84	3–5	Purcell Pavilion (8,360); South Bend, IN
12/23/2012*; 1:30 pm		at Northwestern	L 42–63	3–6	Welsh-Ryan Arena (6,342); Evanston, IL
12/28/2012*; 7:00 pm, NBCSN		Providence	W 69–68	4–6	Pizzitola Sports Center (2,816); Providence, RI
12/31/2012*; 4:00 pm		at Albany	L 50–57	4–7	SEFCU Arena (2,432); Albany, NY
01/04/2013*; 7:00 pm, OSN		at Rhode Island	L 47–59	4–8	Ryan Center (3,858); Kingston, RI
01/08/2013*; 7:00 pm		Niagara	W 75–74 ^{OT}	5–8	Pizzitola Sports Center (748); Providence, RI
01/12/2013*; 2:00 pm		Daniel Webster	W 71–34	6–8	Pizzitola Sports Center (419); Providence, RI
01/19/2013; 7:00 pm		Yale	W 65–51	7–8 (1–0)	Pizzitola Sports Center (1,215); Providence, RI
01/26/2013; 2:00 pm		at Yale	L 64–76 ^{OT}	7–9 (1–1)	John J. Lee Amphitheater (1,684); New Haven, CT
02/01/2013; 7:00 pm		at Dartmouth	W 62–50	8–9 (2–1)	Leede Arena (672); Hanover, NH
02/02/2013; 7:00 pm		at Harvard	L 82–89 ^{2OT}	8–10 (2–2)	Lavietes Pavilion (1,830); Boston, MA
02/08/2013; 7:00 pm		at Princeton	L 46–63	8–11 (2–3)	Jadwin Gymnasium (1,833); Princeton, NJ
02/09/2013; 7:00 pm		at Penn	L 48–71	8–12 (2–4)	The Palestra (3,103); Philadelphia, PA
02/15/2013; 7:00 pm, MyRITV		Columbia	W 58–55	9–12 (3–4)	Pizzitola Sports Center (1,417); Providence, RI
02/16/2013; 6:00 pm		Cornell	L 66–69	9–13 (3–5)	Pizzitola Sports Center (828); Providence, RI
02/22/2013; 7:00 pm, MyRITV		Harvard	L 47–65	9–14 (3–6)	Pizzitola Sports Center (1,321); Providence, RI
02/23/2013; 6:00 pm		Dartmouth	W 59–50	10–14 (4–6)	Pizzitola Sports Center (889); Providence, RI
03/01/2013; 7:00 pm		at Cornell	W 84–65	11–14 (5–6)	Newman Arena (1,812); Ithaca, NY
03/02/2013; 7:00 pm		at Columbia	W 61–58	12–14 (6–6)	Levien Gymnasium (2,166); New York City, NY
03/08/2013; 7:00 pm, MyRITV		Penn	L 64–66	12–15 (6–7)	Pizzitola Sports Center (1,324); Providence, RI
03/09/2013; 6:00 pm		Princeton	W 80–67	13–15 (7–7)	Pizzitola Sports Center (1,376); Providence, RI
*Non-conference game. ^{#}Rankings from AP Poll. (#) Tournament seedings in parentheses. All times are in Eastern Time.
