= 2012–13 Dartmouth Big Green men's basketball team =

American college basketball season

2012–13 Dartmouth Big Green men's basketball
- Conference: Ivy League
- Record: 9–19 (5–9 Ivy)
- Head coach: Paul Cormier (3rd season)
- Assistant coaches: Jean Bain; Jordan Watson; Chris Cormier
- Home arena: Leede Arena

2012–13 Ivy League men's basketball standings
	Conf.				Overall
Team	W		L	PCT	W		L	PCT
x-Harvard	11	–	3	.786	20	–	10	.667
Princeton	10	–	4	.714	17	–	11	.607
Yale	8	–	6	.571	14	–	17	.452
Brown	7	–	7	.500	13	–	15	.464
Penn	6	–	8	.429	9	–	22	.290
Cornell	5	–	9	.357	13	–	18	.419
Dartmouth	5	–	9	.357	9	–	19	.321
Columbia	4	–	10	.286	12	–	16	.429
As of March 23, 2013; Rankings from AP Poll x-Ivy League champion

The 2012–13 Dartmouth Big Green men's basketball team represented Dartmouth College during the 2012–13 NCAA Division I men's basketball season. The Big Green, led by third year head coach Paul Cormier, played their home games at Leede Arena and were members of the Ivy League.

They finished the season 9–19, 5–9 in Ivy League play to finish in a tie for sixth place.

== Roster ==
Number	Name	Position	Height	Weight	Year	Hometown
0	Tommy Carpenter	Forward	6–7	200	Freshman	Greensboro, North Carolina
1	Tyler Melville	Guard	6–2	180	Junior	Plano, Texas
2	Mack McKearney	Guard	6–2	185	Sophomore	Okemos, Michigan
3	Connor Boehm	Forward	6–7	235	Freshman	Winnetka, Illinois
4	Kevin Crescenzi	Guard	6–3	190	Freshman	Singer Island, Florida
5	Matt Rennie	Forward	6–8	220	Freshman	North Brunswick, New Jersey
10	Mallik Gill	Guard	5–9	185	Freshman	New Rochelle, New York
11	Alex Mitola	Guard	5–11	165	Freshman	Florham Park, New Jersey
12	Gabas Maldunas	Forward	6–8	225	Sophomore	Panevėžys, Lithuania
21	Will McConnell	Forward	6–6	195	Sophomore	Atherton, California
22	Kirill Savolainen	Guard/Forward	6–5	195	Sophomore	Vantaa, Finland
23	John Golden	Guard/Forward	6–6	200	Sophomore	Freehold Township, New Jersey
25	Brandon McDonnell	Forward	6–8	210	Freshman	Jackson, New Jersey
33	Jvonte Brooks	Forward	6–6	215	Sophomore	Santee, California
44	Matt LaBove	Center	6–9	235	Senior	Shrewsbury, Massachusetts

== Schedule ==
Date time, TV	Rank^{#}	Opponent^{#}	Result	Record	Site (attendance) city, state
Regular Season
11/10/2012*; 7:00 pm		Maine	W 67–54	1–0	Leede Arena (812); Hanover, NH
11/13/2012*; 7:00 pm		New Hampshire	L 58–72	1–1	Leede Arena (642); Hanover, NH
11/24/2012*; 2:00 pm		IPFW	L 66–70	1–2	Leede Arena (889); Hanover, NH
11/27/2012*; 7:00 pm		at Bucknell	L 49–62	1–3	Sojka Pavilion (2,729); Lewisburg, PA
12/01/2012*; 2:00 pm		at Longwood	W 61–53	2–3	Willett Hall (1,112); Farmville, VA
12/04/2012*; 7:00 pm		at Elon	L 49–71	2–4	Alumni Gym (1,072); Elon, NC
12/08/2012*; 4:00 pm		at Holy Cross	L 56–67	2–5	Hart Center (1,774); Worcester, MA
12/12/2012*; 7:00 pm		at Vermont	L 50–52	2–6	Patrick Gym (2,047); Burlington, VT
12/15/2012*; 3:00 pm, Pac-12		at Arizona State	L 42–61	2–7	Wells Fargo Arena (5,673); Tempe, AZ
12/22/2012*; 1:00 pm		at Bryant	L 66–79	2–8	Chace Athletic Center (781); Smithfield, RI
12/31/2012*; 2:00 pm, ESPN3		at Boston College	L 58–79	2–9	Conte Forum (2,678); Chestnut Hill, MA
01/05/2013*; 7:00 pm		Colgate	L 62–78	2–10	Leede Arena (827); Hanover, NH
01/08/2013*; 7:00 pm		Army	W 75–58	3–10	Leede Arena (521); Hanover, NH
01/12/2013; 4:00 pm		Harvard	L 65–75	3–11 (0–1)	Leede Arena (997); Hanover, NH
01/17/2013*; 7:00 pm		Colby–Sawyer	W 80–42	4–11	Leede Arena (649); Hanover, NH
01/26/2013; 2:00 pm, NBCSN		at Harvard	L 77–82 ^{OT}	4–12 (0–2)	Lavietes Pavilion (1,807); Boston, MA
02/01/2013; 7:00 pm		Brown	L 50–62	4–13 (0–3)	Leede Arena (672); Hanover, NH
02/02/2013; 7:00 pm		Yale	W 71–62	5–13 (1–3)	Leede Arena (1,007); Hanover, NH
02/08/2013; 7:00 pm		at Columbia	W 60–57	6–13 (2–3)	Levien Gymnasium (1,016); New York City, NY
02/10/2013; 12:00 pm		at Cornell	L 56–79	6–14 (2–4)	Newman Arena (1,978); Ithaca, NY
02/15/2013; 7:00 pm		Princeton	L 55–73	6–15 (2–5)	Leede Arena (703); Hanover, NH
02/16/2013; 7:00 pm		Penn	L 57–67	6–16 (2–6)	Leede Arena (889); Hanover, NH
02/22/2013; 7:00 pm		at Yale	L 67–78	6–17 (2–7)	John J. Lee Amphitheater (1,207); New Haven, CT
02/23/2013; 6:00 pm		at Brown	L 50–59	6–18 (2–8)	Pizzitola Sports Center (889); Providence, RI
03/01/2013; 7:00 pm		at Penn	W 69–64	7–18 (3–8)	Palestra (1,867); Philadelphia, PA
03/02/2013; 6:00 pm		at Princeton	L 63–68	7–19 (3–9)	Jadwin Gymnasium (3,167); Princeton, NJ
03/08/2013; 7:00 pm		at Cornell	W 76–62	8–19 (4–9)	Leede Arena (690); Hanover, NH
03/09/2013; 7:00 pm		Columbia	W 64–58	9–19 (5–9)	Leede Arena (779); Hanover, NH
*Non-conference game. ^{#}Rankings from AP Poll. (#) Tournament seedings in parentheses. All times are in Eastern Time.
