= 2012–13 Princeton Tigers men's basketball team =

American college basketball season

2012–13 Princeton Tigers men's basketball
- Conference: Ivy League
- Record: 17–11 (10–4 Ivy)
- Head coach: Mitch Henderson (2nd season)
- Assistant coaches: Brian Earl; Dan Geriot; Marcus Jenkins
- Captains: Ian Hummer; Brendan Connolly; Mack Darrow; T. J. Bray
- Home arena: Jadwin Gymnasium

2012–13 Ivy League men's basketball standings
| | Conf. | | | | Overall |
| Team | W | | L | PCT | W | | L | PCT |
|---|---|---|---|---|---|---|---|---|
| x-Harvard | 11 | – | 3 | .786 | 20 | – | 10 | .667 |
| Princeton | 10 | – | 4 | .714 | 17 | – | 11 | .607 |
| Yale | 8 | – | 6 | .571 | 14 | – | 17 | .452 |
| Brown | 7 | – | 7 | .500 | 13 | – | 15 | .464 |
| Penn | 6 | – | 8 | .429 | 9 | – | 22 | .290 |
| Cornell | 5 | – | 9 | .357 | 13 | – | 18 | .419 |
| Dartmouth | 5 | – | 9 | .357 | 9 | – | 19 | .321 |
| Columbia | 4 | – | 10 | .286 | 12 | – | 16 | .429 |
As of March 23, 2013; Rankings from AP Poll x-Ivy League champion

The 2012–13 Princeton Tigers men's basketball team represented Princeton University during the 2012–13 NCAA Division I men's basketball season. The Tigers, led by second-year head coach Mitch Henderson, played their home games at Jadwin Gymnasium and were members of the Ivy League. The Tigers entered the season as the favorites to win the Ivy League regular season title. For the first time in school history, the team was served by a quartet of captains. They finished the season 17–11, 10–4 in Ivy League play to finish in second place. They chose not to participate in a postseason tournament. Following the season, Hummer earned Ivy League Men's Basketball Player of the Year.

== Roster ==
| Number | Name | Position | Height | Weight | Year | Hometown |
|---|---|---|---|---|---|---|
| 3 | Clay Wilson | Guard | 6–3 | 170 | Sophomore | Tulsa, Oklahoma |
| 4 | Denton Koon | Forward | 6–8 | 205 | Sophomore | Liberty, Missouri |
| 5 | T.J. Bray | Guard | 6–5 | 207 | Junior | New Berlin, Wisconsin |
| 11 | Brian Fabrizius | Forward | 6–11 | 203 | Sophomore | Arlington Heights, Illinois |
| 13 | Mike Washington, Jr. | Guard | 6–3 | 169 | Freshman | Oak Harbor, Washington |
| 21 | Mack Darrow | Forward | 6–9 | 248 | Senior | Lake Barrington, Illinois |
| 22 | Chris Clement | Guard | 6–2 | 190 | Junior | Round Rock, Texas |
| 24 | Will Barrett | Forward | 6–10 | 197 | Junior | Hartsville, Pennsylvania |
| 30 | Hans Brase | Forward | 6–8 | 231 | Freshman | Clover, South Carolina |
| 32 | Daniel Edwards | Forward | 6–8 | 230 | Junior | Dallas, Texas |
| 33 | Ebo Lawrence | Center | 7–1 | 220 | Freshman | London, England |
| 34 | Ian Hummer | Forward | 6–7 | 225 | Senior | Vienna, Virginia |
| 40 | Bobby Garbade | Center | 6–11 | 234 | Sophomore | Binghamton, New York |
| 44 | Brendan Connolly | Center | 6–11 | 255 | Senior | Brentwood, Tennessee |

== Preseason ==
The Ivy League media selected Princeton as the preseason favorite when 16 of 17 voting members (one voter selected Harvard) named Princeton first in the preseason poll. Jeff Goodman of CBS Sports also selected Princeton as his preseason choice with Harvard second, noting that Harvard had been his preseason favorite until the September 2012 Harvard cheating scandal that involved about 125 athletes and students ensnared Kyle Casey and Brandyn Curry, leading to their withdrawal. Casey and Curry had been first-team and second-team All-Ivy selections for the 2011–12 Ivy League men's basketball season, respectively.

Princeton returned three of its five starters from the 2011–12 team: first-team All-Ivy senior forward Ian Hummer, senior center Brendan Connolly and junior guard T.J. Bray. Bray had been the team leader in assists, while Hummer's 515 points was the most by a Tiger in a single season since Bill Bradley. Princeton announced a quartet of captains for the first time in school history. Its trio of seniors, Hummer, Connolly, and Mack Darrow were joined by Bray as team quad-captains for the season. Princeton's most significant loss from the prior year was the graduation of shooting guard Doug Davis. Davis had finished as the second leading scorer in Princeton history. CBS' Goodman selected Hummer as his Preseason Ivy League Player of the Year.

Jimmy Sherburne took the entire school year off from the team and Princeton as he recuperated from a shoulder injury. Three freshmen: Hans Brase, Edward "Edo" Lawrence and Mike Washington, Jr. joined the team. 7-foot-1-inch (2.16 m) Lawrence is believed to be the tallest Princeton Tiger basketball player of all time.

Princeton entered the season with 9 of the team's 14 players measuring 6 feet 8 inches (2.03 m) or taller.

The team was scheduled to appear on NBC Sports Network three times, including the January 12 rivalry game against Penn. In addition, Princeton's March 1 contest with Harvard was broadcast on ESPNU.

== Schedule ==
When Yale defeated Princeton at Jadwin Gymnasium on February 9, it snapped a 21-game conference home winning streak, which was Princeton's longest since it won 26 consecutive home games from 1996 to 1999. The 2012–13 Tigers finished with a 17–11 (10–4) record and did not qualify for the postseason. Princeton entered the final weekend of the season with three games remaining and a half-game lead over Harvard. The team got swept in its two weekend games, while Harvard won both its games to clinch the 2012–13 Ivy League title.

| Date time, TV | Rank^{#} | Opponent^{#} | Result | Record | Site (attendance) city, state |
|---|---|---|---|---|---|
| 11/10/2012*; 12:00 pm | | at Buffalo | W 57–53 | 1–0 | Alumni Arena (4,450); Amherst, NY |
| 11/13/2012*; 7:00 pm | | Northeastern | L 66–67 | 1–1 | Jadwin Gymnasium (1,481); Princeton, NJ |
| 11/16/2012*; 7:00 pm | | Rutgers; Rivalry | L 52–58 | 1–2 | Jadwin Gymnasium (3,150); Princeton, NJ |
| 11/21/2012*; 7:00 pm | | at No. 6 Syracuse | L 53–73 | 1–3 | Carrier Dome (17,881); Syracuse, NY |
| 11/24/2012*; 2:00 pm | | at Lafayette | W 72–53 | 2–3 | Kirby Sports Center (1,544); Easton, PA |
| 11/28/2012*; 7:00 pm | | at Wagner | L 42–48 ^{OT} | 2–4 | Spiro Sports Center (1,432); Staten Island, NY |
| 12/01/2012*; 7:00 pm | | at Kent State | W 62–50 | 3–4 | MAC Center (2,715); Kent, OH |
| 12/08/2012*; 2:00 pm | | Drexel | L 57–64 | 3–5 | Jadwin Gymnasium (1,970); Princeton, NJ |
| 12/15/2012*; 2:30 pm | | vs. Fordham | L 60–63 | 3–6 | Barclays Center (16,514); Brooklyn, NY |
| 12/20/2012*; 7:00 pm | | Rider | W 62–45 | 4–6 | Jadwin Gymnasium (1,570); Princeton, NJ |
| 12/22/2012*; 7:00 pm | | Bucknell | W 79–67 | 5–6 | Jadwin Gymnasium (3,090); Princeton, NJ |
| 12/30/2012*; 7:00 pm | | at Akron | L 58–62 | 5–7 | James A. Rhodes Arena (3,392); Akron, OH |
| 01/05/2013*; 12:00 pm | | at Elon | W 74–64 | 6–7 | Alumni Gym (1,607); Elon, NC |
| 01/12/2013; 6:00 pm, NBCSN | | Penn; Rivalry | W 65–53 | 7–7 (1–0) | Jadwin Gymnasium (3,577); Princeton, NJ |
| 01/27/2013*; 2:00 pm | | New Jersey | W 71–33 | 8–7 | Jadwin Gymnasium (2,174); Princeton, NJ |
| 02/01/2013; 7:00 pm | | Cornell | W 76–59 | 9–7 (2–0) | Jadwin Gymnasium (2,087); Princeton, NJ |
| 02/02/2013; 6:00 pm, NBCSN | | Columbia | W 72–66 | 10–7 (3–0) | Jadwin Gymnasium (3,180); Princeton, NJ |
| 02/08/2013; 7:00 pm | | Brown | W 63–46 | 11–7 (4–0) | Jadwin Gymnasium (1,833); Princeton, NJ |
| 02/09/2013; 6:00 pm | | Yale | L 65–69 | 11–8 (4–1) | Jadwin Gymnasium (2,975); Princeton, NJ |
| 02/15/2013; 7:00 pm | | at Dartmouth | W 73–55 | 12–8 (5–1) | Leede Arena (703); Hanover, NH |
| 02/16/2013; 7:00 pm, NBCSN | | at Harvard | L 57–69 | 12–9 (5–2) | Lavietes Pavilion (2,195); Boston, MA |
| 02/22/2013; 7:00 pm | | at Columbia | W 65–40 | 13–9 (6–2) | Levien Gymnasium (2,119); New York City, NY |
| 02/23/2013; 7:00 pm | | at Cornell | W 72–53 | 14–9 (7–2) | Newman Arena (2,694); Ithaca, NY |
| 03/01/2013; 7:00 pm, ESPNU | | Harvard | W 58–53 | 15–9 (8–2) | Jadwin Gymnasium (4,413); Princeton, NJ |
| 03/02/2013; 6:00 pm | | Dartmouth | W 68–63 | 16–9 (9–2) | Jadwin Gymnasium (3,167); Princeton, NJ |
| 03/08/2013; 7:00 pm | | at Yale | L 66–71 | 16–10 (9–3) | Payne Whitney Gymnasium (1,519); New Haven, CT |
| 03/09/2013; 6:00 pm | | at Brown | L 67–80 | 16–11 (9–4) | Pizzitola Sports Center (1,376); Providence, RI |
| 03/12/2013; 7:30 pm | | at Penn; Rivalry | W 71–58 | 17–11 (10–4) | The Palestra (4,814); Philadelphia, PA |
*Non-conference game. ^{#}Rankings from AP Poll. (#) Tournament seedings in parentheses. All times are in Eastern Time.

=== In season ===
Each week the Ivy League selects a player of the week and a rookie of the week.

| | Player of the Week | | | | Rookie of the Week | | |
| | Name | School | Class | Position | Name | School | Position |
| November 12, 2012 | Will Barrett | Princeton | Jr. | F | | | |
| December 10, 2012 | Ian Hummer | Princeton | Sr. | F | | | |
| December 17, 2012 | Ian Hummer | Princeton | Sr. | F | | | |
| December 24, 2012 | Ian Hummer | Princeton | Sr. | F | Hans Brase | Princeton | F |
| January 7, 2013 | Ian Hummer | Princeton | Sr. | F | | | |
| January 14, 2013 | T.J. Bray | Princeton | Jr. | G | | | |
| February 4, 2013 | Ian Hummer | Princeton | Sr. | F | | | |
| February 25, 2013 | Ian Hummer | Princeton | Sr. | F | | | |
| March 3, 2013 | Ian Hummer | Princeton | Sr. | F | | | |

=== All-Ivy ===
Ian Hummer was named Ivy League Men's Basketball Player of the Year. The following players earned Ivy League postseason recognition:

First Team All-Ivy

- ^Ian Hummer, Princeton (Sr., F, Vienna, Va.)

Second Team All-Ivy

- T.J. Bray, Princeton (Jr., G, New Berlin, Wis.)

Honorable Mention All-Ivy

- Denton Koon, Princeton (So., G, Liberty, Mo.)

^Unanimous Selection

On March 12, the U.S. Basketball Writers Association named Hummer to its 2012–13 Men's All-District II (NY, NJ, DE, DC, PA, WV) Team, based upon voting from its national membership. The National Association of Basketball Coaches announced their Division I All-District teams on March 26, recognizing the nation's best men's collegiate basketball student-athletes. Selected and voted on by member coaches of the NABC, 240 student-athletes, from 24 districts were chosen. The selections on this list were then eligible for the State Farm Coaches' Division I All-America teams. Hummer was among the District 13 first team selections. Hummer also earned Associated Press honorable mention All-American recognition.
