= Siyani Chambers =

American basketball player (born 1993)

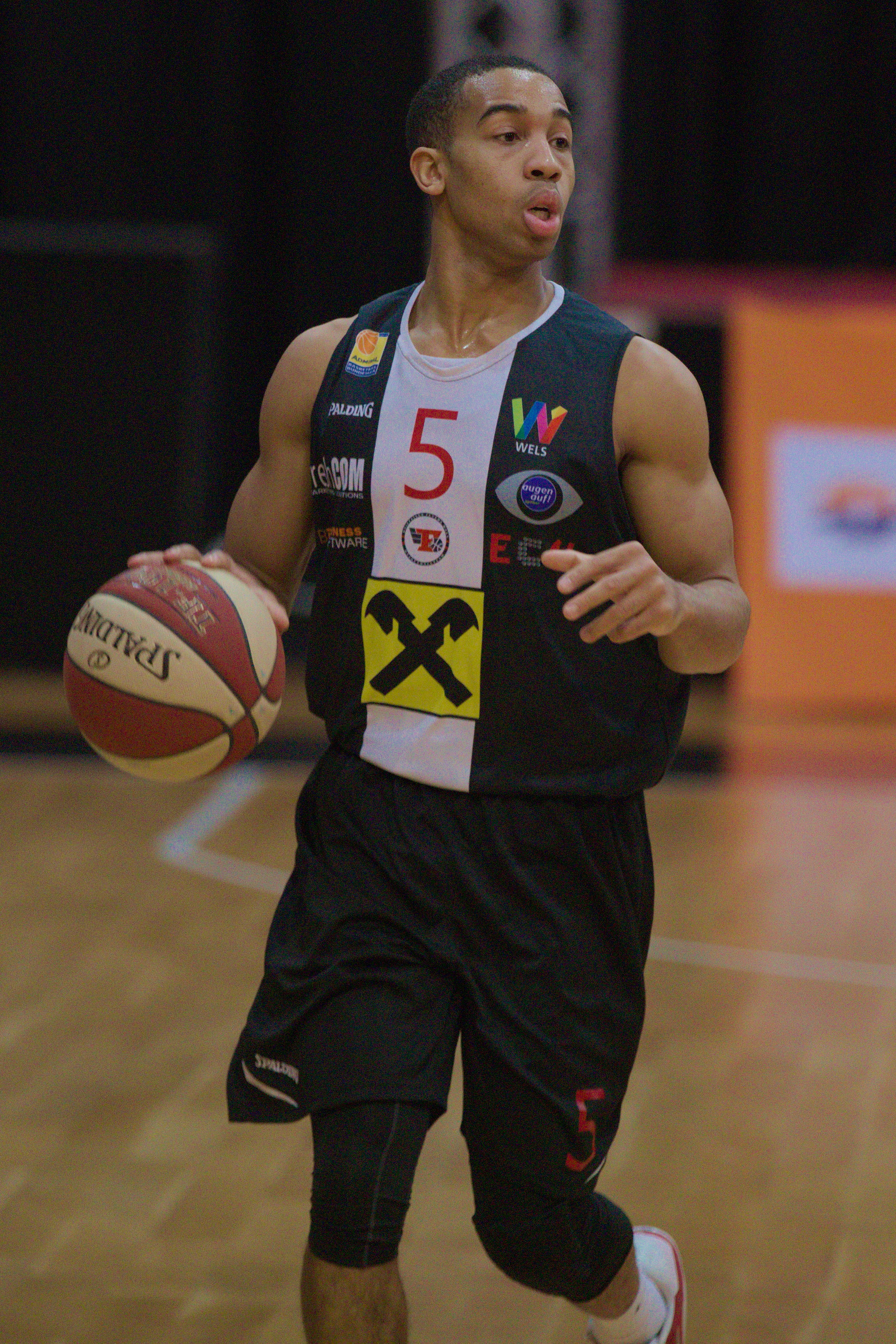
- Chambers with the Raiffeisen Flyers Wels on January 21, 2018

Free Agent
- Position: Point guard

Personal information
- Born: December 14, 1993 (age 32)
- Listed height: 6 ft 0 in (1.83 m)
- Listed weight: 170 lb (77 kg)

Career information
- High school: Hopkins (Golden Valley, Minnesota)
- College: Harvard (2012–2017)
- NBA draft: 2017: undrafted
- Playing career: 2017–present

Career history
- 2017–2018: Flyers Wels
- 2018–2019: Gießen 46ers
- 2019–2020: Heroes Den Bosch
- 2020–2021: BC Balkan Botevgrad
- 2021–2022: Borås Basket
- 2022–2023: BC Körmend
- 2023–2024: Alba Fehérvár
- 2024–2025: ADA Blois
- 2025–present: Caen

Career highlights
- Ivy League Rookie of the Year (2013); Minnesota Mr. Basketball (2012)

Siyani Chambers (born December 14, 1993) is an American professional basketball player who last played for ADA Blois of the LNB Pro B. He played college basketball for the Harvard Crimson, finishing his career in the 2016–17 season. He was 2013 Ivy League Rookie of the Year. In 2012, he was designated Minnesota Mr. Basketball.

== High school ==
Chambers played basketball at Hopkins High School in Minnesota. He helped the team win state championships in 2010 and 2011, while also helping the team to a third-place finish in 2012. In both 2011 and 2012, he was named to the all-tournament team. In 2012, he captained the team, and was named to the all-state team. He was named Minnesota Mr. Basketball as well. Chambers was considered a two-star recruit by ESPN, while Scout and Rivals ranked Chambers as a three-star prospect. ESPN ranked Chambers as the 45th best point guard in the nation. He played AAU basketball for the Howard Pulley Panthers.

== College career ==
Chambers was not expected to start coming into the season, but in the wake of the 2012 Harvard cheating scandal and the subsequent withdrawal of starting point guard Brandyn Curry, he was thrust into a starting role. Chambers got off to a hot start for the Crimson, hitting 30 of his first 32 free throws. He hit a game winning layup with 4 seconds to go against Boston University on December 11. On January 5, he had his first career double-double against Rice University, scoring 14 points and handing out 10 assists. He had three double-doubles overall, with the other two coming in a double-overtime victory over Brown University and in a win over Cornell University. Chambers helped lead Harvard to an Ivy League Title and a second-round victory in the NCAA Tournament over the New Mexico Lobos. In the third round, the Crimson lost to Arizona. Chambers lost a tooth during the game. Chambers started all 30 games for the Crimson, playing 37.8 minutes per game (which was first in the conference and fourth in the nation) and averaging 12.6 points per game, good for sixth in the conference. His 5.7 assists per game topped the Ivy League, and were also more than any other freshman in the country. Chambers averaged 2.6 rebounds and 1.5 steals per game, while shooting 43.4% from the field, 42.4% from three-point range, and 81.4% from the line. Chambers received many awards as a result of his play. He was named co-MVP of the Crimson team, and Yahoo named him the best mid-major freshman. Chambers was the Ivy League Rookie of the Week five times, and was named Ivy League Rookie of the Year. Chambers was also named to the NABC all-district first team, and was a candidate for the Bob Cousy Award, which is given annually to the nation's top point guard. Most notably, Chambers joined his Harvard teammate Wesley Saunders on the All-Ivy League first team, becoming the first freshman in conference history to do so.

Both Brandyn Curry and Kyle Casey return for the Crimson this year. Many analysts have cited the Crimson as a potential top 25 team in the upcoming season. ESPN named Chambers as one of the most influential sophomores in the nation heading into the season. Prior to the start of the season, Chambers joined returning teammate Brandyn Curry on the watch list for the Bob Cousy Award.

On September 1, 2015, Chambers tore his ACL in a workout. In order to maintain his senior season of eligibility, he withdrew from Harvard for the 2015–16 academic year because Ivy League schools do not allow redshirt seasons.

== Professional career ==
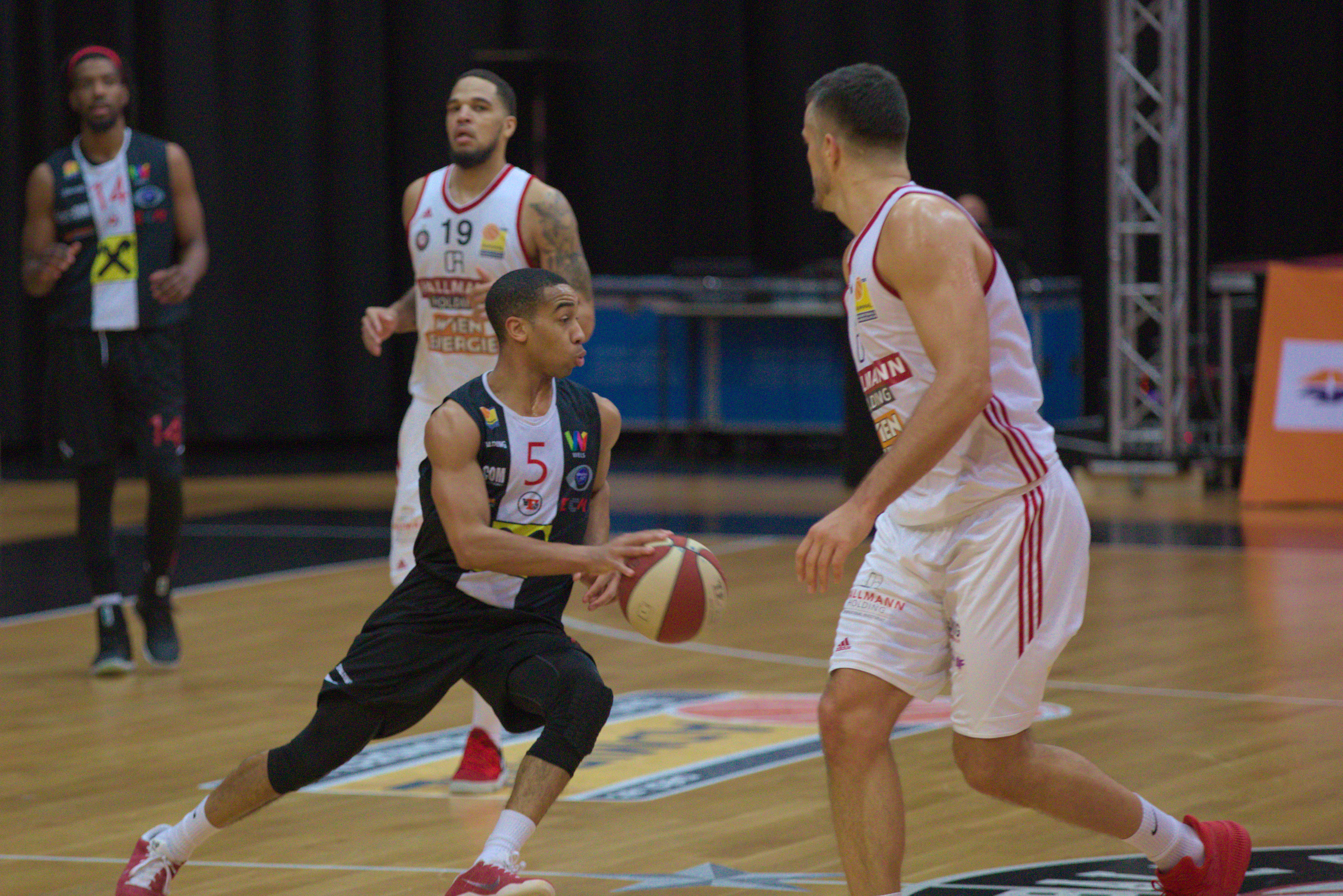
Chambers (left) dribbling in January 2018 for Flyers Wels

In the 2017–18 season, Chambers played with the Flyers Wels of the Austrian Basketball Bundesliga (ÖBL). He averaged 14.9 points, 5.3 assists, and 1.6 steals per game in his rookie season in Austria, earning an all-star appearance in the league. In the 2018–19 season, Chambers played with Gießen 46ers in the German Basketball Bundesliga.

On August 21, 2019, Chambers signed with Heroes Den Bosch of the Dutch Basketball League (DBL). The 2019–20 DBL season was ended prematurely on March 20, 2020, because of the COVID-19 pandemic.

Chambers spent the 2020–21 season with Balkan Botevgrad of the Bulgarian league. He averaged 13.4 points, 5.4 assists, 2.4 rebounds, and 2.1 steals per game. On August 25, 2021, Chambers signed with Borås Basket of the Swedish Basketball League.

On June 20, 2024, he signed with ADA Blois of the LNB Pro A.. For the 2025-26 season, he plays for Caen Basket Calvados.
