= Shonn Miller =

American basketball player (born 1993)

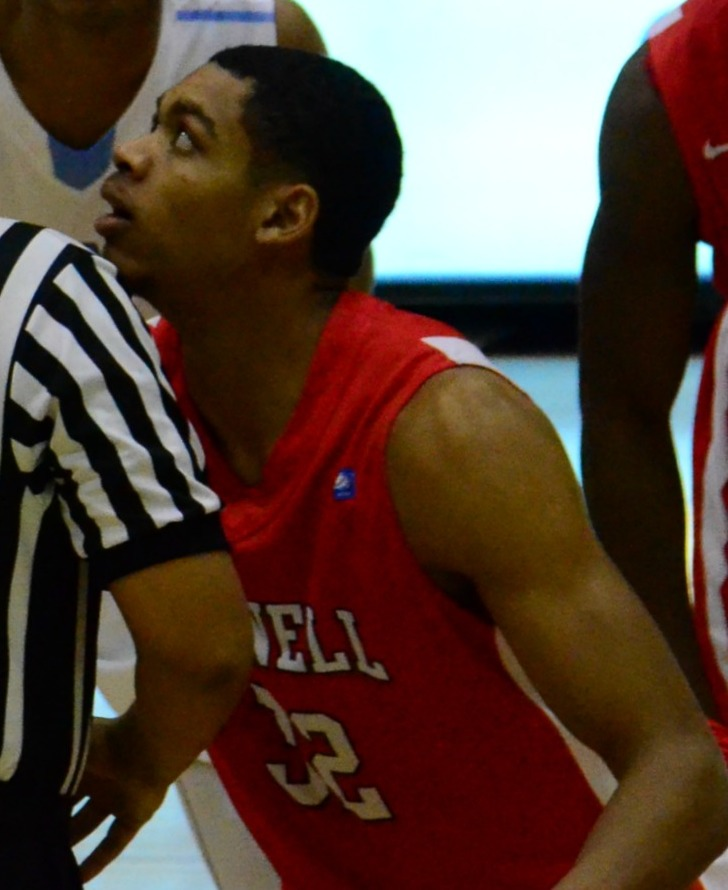
- Miller playing for Cornell in 2015

Personal information
- Born: August 26, 1993 (age 33) Cleveland, Ohio, U.S.
- Listed height: 6 ft 7 in (2.01 m)
- Listed weight: 222 lb (101 kg)

Career information
- High school: St. Ignatius (Cleveland, Ohio)
- College: Cornell (2011–2015); UConn (2015–2016)
- NBA draft: 2016: undrafted
- Playing career: 2016–2024
- Position: Power forward

Career history
- 2016–2017: Greensboro Swarm
- 2018–2019: Salt Lake City Stars
- 2019–2020: U.D. Oliveirense
- 2020: Soles de Mexicali
- 2020–2021: Trapani
- 2021–2022: Kolossos Rodou
- 2022: Niners Chemnitz
- 2022–2023: Riesen Ludwigsburg
- 2023: Fuerza Regia de Monterrey
- 2024: Meralco Bolts
- 2024: Hapoel Galil Elyon
- 2024: Fuerza Regia de Monterrey

Career highlights
- First-team All-Ivy League (2013)

Shonn Devante Miller (born August 26, 1993) is an American former professional basketball player. He played college basketball for Cornell and Connecticut.

== High school career ==
Miller is a native of Euclid, Ohio and attended St. Ignatius High School. He played for the King James Shooting Stars AAU team. Miller was an Associated Press Divisions I All-Ohio Honorable Mention as a senior.

== College career ==
Miller was coach Bill Courtney's first recruit at Cornell. In 2011–12, he was the Ivy League rookie of the year. He injured his shoulder in a game at Princeton and missed the final four games of the regular season, all Cornell losses. He still was named to the First Team All-Ivy League after averaging 11.5 points and 6.8 rebounds per game. Miller was forced to sit out his junior season due to shoulder surgery as the Big Red won only two games without him. On March 3, 2015, Cornell upset league champion Harvard 57–49, with Miller contributing 24 points and 15 rebounds. As a senior, he averaged 16.8 points and 8.5 rebounds per game and was named to the First Team All-Ivy. Miller also led the team in blocks and steals and became the first player in Cornell history to amass 100 blocks and 100 steals in a career. Courtney called him the most talented player he coached.

Due to an Ivy League rule that forbids graduate players, Miller was forced to transfer for his final season of eligibility. He opted to transfer to Connecticut, which was coming off a 20–15 season and NIT appearance. He chose the Huskies after a phone call with Kevin Ollie but would have preferred to stay with Cornell. Miller scored a season-high 25 points in a 99–52 blowout of Central Connecticut State on December 23, 2015, in a game that saw teammate Daniel Hamilton post a triple-double. In his only season with the Huskies, he averaged 12.3 points and 5.2 rebounds per game. He was named an Honorable Mention All-American Athletic Conference.

== Professional career ==
Miller played with the Utah Jazz in the NBA Summer League. He was selected by the Greensboro Swarm 13th overall in the 2016 NBA Development League Draft. In March, 2018, Miller signed with the Salt Lake City Stars and averaged 4.6 points and 5.4 rebounds per game in five games. In August 2019, Miller signed with U.D. Oliveirense, Portuguese champion of 2018–2019. On September 13, 2020, he signed with Soles de Mexicali of the Liga Nacional de Baloncesto Profesional.

Miller spent the 2020–21 season with Trapani of the Serie A2 Basket. He averaged 13.9 points, 8.8 rebounds, 1.4 assists, 1.2 blocks and 1.0 steal per game.

On August 27, 2021, Miller signed with Kolossos Rodou of the Greek Basket League. In 21 games, he averaged 11.5 points, 6 rebounds, 1.3 assists, 0.7 blocks and 0.9 steals, playing around 25 minutes per contest.

On July 29, 2022, he has signed with Niners Chemnitz of the Basketball Bundesliga (BBL).

On January 4, 2024, Miller signed with the Meralco Bolts of the Philippine Basketball Association (PBA) to replace Zach Lofton as the team's import for the 2023–24 PBA Commissioner's Cup and the 2023–24 East Asia Super League.
