= At All Costs (film) =

- Film poster
- Directed by: Mike Nicoll
- Written by: Mike Nicoll
- Produced by: Ian Ward
- Edited by: Daniel Freedman; Evan Schrodek
- Music by: Alexis Marsh; Samuel Jones
- Production company: Sony Pictures
- Distributed by: XLrator Media
- Release date: September 30, 2016
- Running time: 100 minutes
- Country: United States
- Language: English

At All Costs is a 2016 documentary film that explores how the AAU basketball circuit has professionalized youth basketball in America. As the business of youth basketball balloons into a multi-billion dollar industry, the stakes for finding "the next big thing" have never been higher. The film follows a highly ranked high-school recruit, his family, and a competitive AAU team as they travel the country playing in marquee tournaments, competing against top-tier athletes, fighting to make it to the next level.

== Synopsis ==
The main subjects of the documentary are Etop "Tope" Udo-Ema, founder and CEO of the successful Compton Magic AAU program, and Parker Jackson-Cartwright, a high school basketball player who is hoping for a Division I basketball scholarship. Through these subjects, different aspects of the AAU basketball world are explored. Interviews with experts on high school and college basketball are interspersed throughout the film to better explain the importance of AAU basketball and its change over time.

Tope is concerned with building his team's "brand". He impresses on his players that they need to work hard and win games to further the brand of Compton Magic. The purpose is both to grab the attention of college coaches for the players and of middle school recruits for Tope. Tope's assistants search for middle schoolers that could play for the Compton Magic, finding out about their family situations and visiting their homes. They need a supply of talented, highly ranked players in order to win games and renew their contract with their sponsor, Adidas. AAU teams want to be sponsored to receive free gear from shoe companies—Nike, Adidas, and Under Armour—to help them recruit players. Shoe companies want their AAU teams to have the best players to raise the profile of their tournaments and to funnel to the college teams sponsored by their company.

Tope does care for his players, and college coaches know that the AAU coach is often the main person who can sway a recruit's decision. Gabe York's single mother praises the influence that Tope has had on her son, who sleeps at Tope's house for part of the summer. When Gabe complains about his playing time on the Arizona Wildcats, Tope takes responsibility for helping him find a new college team if necessary. His former players say that he is involved in his players' college decisions and families.

Parker is on the opposite side of the AAU world. He is a 5'10, 16-year-old point guard who plays for the Nike-sponsored California Supreme AAU team and attends Loyola High School. His father, Ramon, volunteered as a referee when his sons were young in order to learn more about youth basketball. Parker's older brother, Miles, is playing for the Penn Quakers, but Ramon believes that Miles could have been playing for a better team if he had known as much as he does now.

Players like Parker travel all summer across the country, exhausting themselves, for basketball tournaments and camps run by the shoe company that sponsors their AAU team. Ramon decided that Parker needed to be in the Nike Elite Youth Basketball League (EYBL) to get more exposure, which is why he plays for Cal Supreme. Even though Parker hurt his foot during the summer, he has no time to go see a doctor. Ramon would prefer to sacrifice the high school basketball season, where Parker will be seen by more college coaches. But Parker collapses twice on the court, once during the summer and once during the playoffs of his high school season, because of his injured foot. Parker commits to the Arizona Wildcats at the end of the film.

== Reception ==
At All Costs received generally mixed reviews.

The review aggregator website Rotten Tomatoes reported a 43% approval rating with an average rating of 3.1/5 based on 31 reviews.

Under the Radar gave it a 5.5/10 rating and said, "More explanative than investigative, At All Costs draws attention to just how much amateur basketball has changed, but would benefit from a deeper examination of the consequences it has had on the players and their families."

The Lead Sports called it "the single best documentary about AAU basketball", describing it as a modernized Hoop Dreams and saying, "It’s not your traditional 'Michael Moore' documentary that tells its audience how to feel…quite the contrary, it presents the world as it exists and it presumes a certain level of intelligence in its audience to discern the subtlety (and hypocrisy) of the modern day youth system."

== See also ==
- Nike Elite Youth Basketball League
