= Bill Courtney (basketball) =

American college basketball coach (1970–2026)

Biographical details
- Born: May 4, 1970
- Died: January 13, 2026 (aged 55)

Playing career
- 1988–1992: Bucknell
- 1992: Philadelphia Spirit
- 1993–1994: Hong Kong professional league
- Position: Guard

Coaching career (HC unless noted)
- 1992–1994: Robinson Secondary School (assistant)
- 1994–1995: Thomas Jefferson HS for S&T (assistant)
- 1995–1996: American (assistant)
- 1996–1997: Bowling Green (assistant)
- 1997–2005: George Mason (assistant)
- 2005–2006: Providence (assistant)
- 2006–2009: Virginia (assistant)
- 2009–2010: Virginia Tech (assistant)
- 2010–2016: Cornell
- 2017–2019: DePaul (assistant)
- 2019–2022: Miami (FL) (assistant)
- 2022–2024: Miami (FL) (associate HC)
- 2024–2025: Miami (FL) (interim HC)
- 2025–2026: Temple (assistant)

Head coaching record
- Overall: 63–129 (.328)

Bill Courtney (May 4, 1970 – January 13, 2026) was an American college basketball coach who was an assistant coach at Temple at the time of his death. He had previously been the head men's basketball coach at Cornell and interim head coach for the Miami Hurricanes during the 2024–25 season.

== Early life and education ==
Courtney was a native of Springfield, Virginia, graduating from Robert E. Lee High School. He attended and played basketball for Bucknell University. He earned All–Patriot League honors and graduated in 1992 with a degree in education. Courtney played professional basketball in Hong Kong, where he was league and 1993 Asian All-Star Game MVP. He also played in the USBL before starting college coaching. While playing professionally, he was an assistant basketball coach at two Virginia high schools, Thomas Jefferson HS for S&T and Robinson Secondary School.

== Coaching career ==
On April 23, 2010, following the resignation of former head coach Steve Donahue, a press conference was held at Cornell University to officially hire Courtney as the next basketball coach. Courtney thanked Donahue for leading the University to three consecutive Ivy League titles, and mentioned that his first goal was to win a fourth. He also mentioned that while "no one thinks we're going to be that good next year," he told the team to "put no limits on what they can accomplish because [Courtney] certainly won't." Courtney's official title was Robert E. Gallagher '44 Head Coach of Cornell Men's Basketball.

After six seasons as a head coach and compiling a losing record, Courtney's contract was not renewed in March 2016.

Courtney was hired by DePaul as an assistant coach on June 28, 2017.

After two seasons serving as an assistant coach at DePaul, Courtney was hired by Miami (FL) on June 12, 2019. He was promoted to associate head coach in May 2022.

Following Jim Larrañaga's resignation on December 26, 2024, Courtney was named the interim head coach of Miami for the remainder of the season.

== Death ==
Temple University announced on January 13, 2026 that Courtney had died at the age of 55.

== Head coaching record ==
Record table
| Season | Team | Overall | Conference | Standing | Postseason |
|---|---|---|---|---|---|
Cornell Big Red (Ivy League) (2010–2016)
| 2010–11 | Cornell | 10–18 | 6–8 | T–5th | |
| 2011–12 | Cornell | 12–16 | 7–7 | 5th | |
| 2012–13 | Cornell | 13–18 | 5–9 | T–6th | |
| 2013–14 | Cornell | 2–26 | 1–13 | 8th | |
| 2014–15 | Cornell | 13–17 | 5–9 | T–5th | |
| 2015–16 | Cornell | 10–18 | 3–11 | T–7th | |
| Cornell: | | 60–113 (.347) | 27–57 (.321) | | |
Miami Hurricanes (Atlantic Coast Conference) (2024–2025)
| 2024–25 | Miami | 3–16 | 3–16 | 18th | |
| Miami (FL): | | 3–16 (.158) | 3–16 (.158) | | |
| Total: | | 63–129 (.328) | | | |
