= Yanni Hufnagel =

American entrepreneur

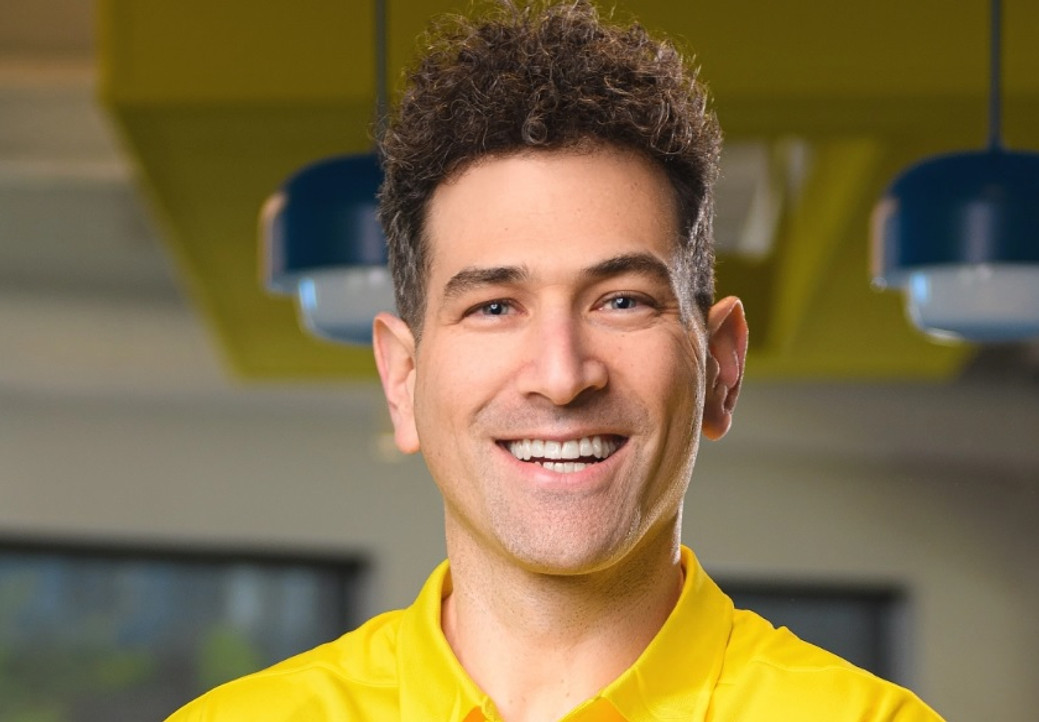
- Lemon Perfect Founder and CEO Yanni Hufnagel

Current position
- Title: Founder & CEO of The Lemon Perfect Company

Biographical details
- Born: August 26, 1982 (age 44); New York City, New York
- Education: Penn State; Cornell (B.S. '06); Oklahoma (M.Ed. '10)

Coaching career (HC unless noted)
- 2007–2009: Oklahoma (graduate asst.)
- 2009–2013: Harvard (asst.)
- 2013–2014: Vanderbilt (asst.)
- 2014–2016: California (asst.)
- 2016–2017: Nevada (asst.)

Yanni Hufnagel (born August 26, 1982) is an American entrepreneur, former college basketball coach, and the founder and CEO of Atlanta-based The Lemon Perfect Company, maker of the enhanced water brand Lemon Perfect. Before starting Lemon Perfect, he served as an assistant coach of the Nevada Wolf Pack men's basketball team under Eric Musselman.

He previously served as an assistant coach for the California Golden Bears, Vanderbilt Commodores, and Harvard Crimson. Hufnagel was regarded as one of the top recruiters in college basketball.

== Early life and education ==
Hufnagel was raised in Scarsdale, New York and is Jewish. He played lacrosse for Scarsdale High School and was a team captain. After being cut from Scarsdale High School's varsity basketball team, he took a position as the color commentator for the team's games on a local access cable TV channel.

He attended Pennsylvania State University for one year, where he was a defenseman on the lacrosse team. Hufnagel then transferred to Cornell University, where he served as a student manager for the Big Red men's basketball team. At Cornell, Hufnagel earned a Bachelor of Science degree in Industrial and Labor Relations in 2006.

Hufnagel began his coaching career as an intern with the New Jersey Nets before attending the University of Oklahoma, where he served as a graduate assistant coach for the Sooners men's basketball team. Hufnagel is credited with helping develop Blake Griffin while at Oklahoma. At Oklahoma, Hufnagel earned a master's degree in Adult and Higher Education with an Emphasis in Intercollegiate Athletics Administration in 2010.

== Career ==
=== Coaching ===
==== Harvard Crimson, Maccabiah Games ====
In June 2009, Hufnagel joined the Harvard Crimson men's basketball program as an assistant coach under Tommy Amaker. In 2011, he was voted by his peers in a CBS Sports survey as the mid-major assistant coach most likely to "make it big time due to his recruiting ability." He was named to a CBS Sports college basketball "dream team" of assistant coaches before the 2012–13 season and labeled "one of the most relentless and energetic recruiters in the game." He is also noted for his role in helping develop Jeremy Lin and Wesley Saunders at Harvard. In Hufnagel's four years with Harvard, the school went 90–30, and in his final season, Harvard upset New Mexico in the 2013 NCAA Division I men's basketball tournament.

Hufnagel was appointed to coach the Team USA Youth Team at the 19th Maccabiah Games in Israel but declined in order to accept an assistant coaching position with the Vanderbilt Commodores.

==== Vanderbilt Commodores, California Golden Bears, Nevada Wolf Pack ====
In May 2013, Hufnagel joined the Vanderbilt Commodores as an assistant coach under Kevin Stallings. He was credited by ESPN with helping Vanderbilt land the 29th-ranked 2014 recruiting class, which included Wade Baldwin IV and Matthew Fisher-Davis. After one season, Hufnagel left the program.

In 2014, Hufnagel joined the California Golden Bears coaching staff, led by Cuonzo Martin. Hufnagel is credited with helping recruit Jaylen Brown and Ivan Rabb to the team. The pair helped lead the Golden Bears to a 2016 NCAA Tournament berth.

In 2015, a reporter covering the Golden Bears filed a sexual harassment complaint against Hufnagel. Following an investigation, Hufnagel was fired on March 14, 2016. In response, Hufnagel's lawyer, Mary McNamara, asserted the extent of the relationship was a "flirtation that never went anywhere" and noted that the reporter told investigators Hufnagel "never touched her."

On April 8, 2016, Hufnagel accepted an assistant coaching position with Eric Musselman and the University of Nevada Wolf Pack men's basketball team. Hufnagel and Nevada mutually parted ways after one season.

=== Lemon Perfect ===
In December 2017, Hufnagel founded Lemon Perfect, a flavored lemon water brand in the enhanced water category. Lemon Perfect was named one of the "Best New Products" at BevNET's Best of 2019 Awards.

In January 2020, the company received a viral boost after the product was spotted in a photo on Beyoncé's Instagram.

In August 2020, the company announced that it had raised $11.6 million in funding to date from a network of investors, including Spencer Dinwiddie, Channing Frye, Lindsay Gottlieb, Blake Griffin, Josh Hart, Kyle Kuzma, Meyers Leonard, De'Anthony Melton, and Nick Young.

In April 2022, Lemon Perfect closed a $31 million Series A funding round. Beyoncé was a Series A investor, along with Beechwood Capital, NNS Capital, and Trousdale Ventures. The investment gives Lemon Perfect total funding of over $42.2 million and a total valuation of over $100 million.
