= Keith Wright (basketball) =

American basketball player (born 1989)

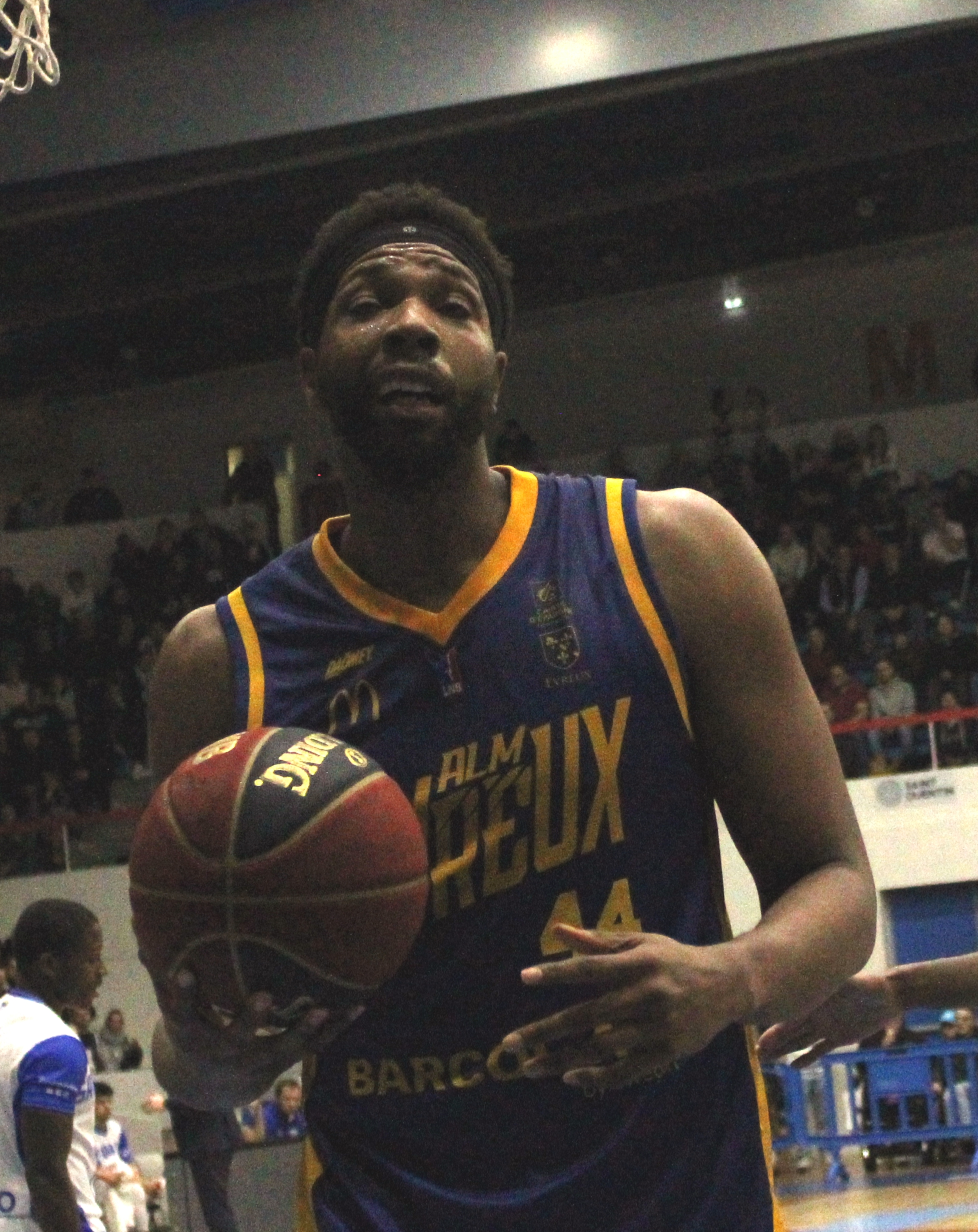

No. 44 – Atomerőmű SE
- Position: Power forward
- League: Nemzeti Bajnokság I/A

Personal information
- Born: July 22, 1989 (age 37) Suffolk, Virginia, U.S.
- Listed height: 6 ft 8 in (2.03 m)
- Listed weight: 240 lb (109 kg)

Career information
- High school: Princess Anne (Virginia Beach, Virginia); Norfolk Collegiate (Norfolk, Virginia)
- College: Harvard (2008–2012)
- NBA draft: 2012: undrafted
- Playing career: 2012–present

Career history
- 2012–2013: Uppsala
- 2013–2014: Energa Czarni
- 2014: Uppsala
- 2014–2016: Austin Spurs
- 2016–2017: Westchester Knicks
- 2017: Mahindra Floodbuster
- 2017–2018: Kolossos Rodou
- 2018–2020: St. John's Edge
- 2020: Westchester Knicks
- 2020–2021: Rostock Seawolves
- 2021–2022: USC Heidelberg
- 2022: Stade Rochelais
- 2023: ALM Évreux Basket
- 2023–present: Atomerőmű SE

Career highlights
- NBA D-League Sportsmanship Award (2017); Ivy League Player of the Year (2011); AP honorable mention All-American (2011)
- Stats at Basketball Reference

Keith Andre Wright (born July 22, 1989) is an American professional basketball player for Atomerőmű SE of the Nemzeti Bajnokság I/A. He played college basketball for Harvard.

== High school career ==
Wright attended Princess Anne High School and Norfolk Collegiate School, where he graduated from. As a senior, he averaged 20.5 points, 13.0 rebounds and 3.5 blocks per game. In high school, Wright was a two-time All-State selection.

== College career ==
=== Freshman season ===
In Wright's freshman season, he appeared in 24 games, including 17 starts. He averaged 8.0 points per game and 5.5 rebounds per game. He was named Ivy League Rookie of the Week twice.

=== Sophomore season ===
Wright appeared in 24 games, starting in 18. During his sophomore season, Wright averaged 8.9 points per game and 4.6 rebounds per game. During this season, Harvard made the CollegeInsider.com Postseason Tournament. Harvard lost in the first round of the tournament to Appalachian State.

=== Junior season ===
In his junior season at Harvard, Wright played well enough to be named the 2011 Ivy League Men's Basketball Player of the Year, after leading the Crimson in scoring at 14.8 points per game and rebounding at 8.3 rebounds per game. Wright was also a unanimous selection to the Men's Basketball All-Ivy First Team. In Wright's junior season, Harvard made the National Invitation Tournament for the first time in school history, but lost in the first round to Oklahoma State. In the game, Wright recorded ten points and four rebounds.

=== Senior season ===
Prior to his senior season, Wright was named to the Wooden Award preseason top 50 watch list. He was also named the preseason Ivy League Player of the Year by Rivals.com, Athlon Sports, and Sporting News. Wright was a co-captain with Oliver McNally. In Wright's senior season, he averaged 10.6 points per game and 8.1 rebounds per game. He also became the Crimson's all-time leading shot blocker. This was good enough for Wright to be named to the Men's Basketball All-Ivy League second team. In the 2011–12 season, Harvard made the NCAA men's basketball tournament for the first time since 1946. Harvard lost to the Vanderbilt Commodores in the round of 64, with Wright recording eight points and nine rebounds. After the season ended, Wright was chosen to play in the Reese's All-Star Game. Wright recorded seven points and six rebounds in the game. Wright also participated in the Portsmouth Invitational Tournament.

== Professional career ==
After going undrafted in the 2012 NBA draft, Wright joined the Dallas Mavericks for the 2012 NBA Summer League. In October 2012, he signed with Uppsala Basket of Sweden for the 2012–13 season. He went on to be named the 2013 Center of the Year.

On July 16, 2013, Wright signed a one-year deal with Czarni Słupsk of the Polish Basketball League. In January 2014, he left Czarni and re-signed with Uppsala for the rest of the 2013–14 season.

On November 1, 2014, Wright was selected by the Austin Spurs in the third round of the 2014 NBA Development League Draft. In 46 regular season games for Austin in 2014–15, Wright averaged 5.9 points and 6.7 rebounds per game. On October 30, 2015, Wright was reacquired by the Spurs. On February 23, 2016, he was traded to the Westchester Knicks in exchange for former Harvard teammate Wesley Saunders. On February 25, he made his debut for Westchester in a 98–86 win over the Fort Wayne Mad Ants, recording four points, three rebounds and one block in 12 minutes.

On April 3, 2017, Wright signed with the Mahindra Floodbuster of the Philippine Basketball Association.

For the 2018–19 season, Wright joined the St. John's Edge of the National Basketball League of Canada. On February 28, 2020, Wright was signed by the Westchester Knicks.

In 2021, Wright joined USC Heidelberg and averaged 3.0 points and 2.9 rebounds per game. On January 15, 2022, he signed with Stade Rochelais of the Nationale Masculine 1.

== The Basketball tournament ==
Keith Wright played for the Talladega Knights in the 2018 edition of The Basketball Tournament. In 4 games, he averaged 9 points, 5.3 rebounds, and shot 57 percent from the field. The Knights reached the Northeast Regional Championship before falling to the Golden Eagles.
