= Miles Jackson-Cartwright =

American professional basketball player (born 1992)

No. 7 – Basket Esch
- Position: Point guard
- League: Total League

Personal information
- Born: April 7, 1992 (age 34)
- Listed height: 6 ft 3 in (1.91 m)
- Listed weight: 175 lb (79 kg)

Career information
- High school: Loyola (Los Angeles, California)
- College: Penn (2010–2014)
- NBA draft: 2014: undrafted
- Playing career: 2014–present

Career history
- 2014–2015: Aris Leeuwarden
- 2015–2016: White Wings Hanau
- 2017–2018: TG s.Oliver Würzburg Akademie
- 2018: s.Oliver Würzburg
- 2018–2019: T71 Dudelange
- 2019–present: Basket Esch

Career highlights
- Total League Champion (2019); First-team All-Total League (2019); Defensive Player of the Year Total League (2019); First-team All-Total League (2018); Guard of the Year Total League (2018); Second-team All-Ivy League (2013)

Miles Ramon Jackson-Cartwright (born April 7, 1992) is an American professional basketball player.

== Amateur career ==
=== Early years ===
Miles Jackson-Cartwright started his amateur career in 1998 as a member of the San Fernando Valley Guardian Angels, an Amateur Athletic Union (AAU) sanctioned basketball team coached by David Wooley. He continued the development of fundamental basketball skills in 1999 at HoopMasters, a nationally renowned AAU basketball program headquartered in Santa Monica, California and headed by coach John Fischer. Jackson-Cartwright completed his participation in AAU sanctioned events by joining California Supreme, a former Nike Elite Youth Basketball League (EYBL) team coached by Gary Franklin Sr. and Mike Law, in 2009.

=== High school ===
Jackson-Cartwright attended Loyola High School of Los Angeles, a Catholic institution for young men. He graduated with honors in 2010 and completed his high school career as a three-year starter on the varsity team. Jackson-Cartwright also served as the team's captain for three years and lead them to Mission League titles in 2008 and 2009. He was selected as the 2009 Mission League MVP and earned First Team All-Mission League honors in 2008 and 2010. Jackson-Cartwright earned First Team All-California Interscholastic Federation (CIF) honors in 2009 and 2010. ESPN selected him to their All-California team in 2009 and 2010 and he was picked to be a member of the IRN Sports All-California team in 2010. He also earned the Loyola High School Athlete of the Year Award in 2010.

=== College ===
Jackson-Cartwright attended the University of Pennsylvania (Penn) of the Ivy League after being heavily recruited by the school's coaching staff. At the time he was the highest ranked player by ESPN's basketball writers and other credible college basketball scouting services to ever commit to the Penn in its long and storied history. Miles was a four-year starter who served three seasons as a team captain. Jackson-Cartwright ended his career at Penn second all-time in minutes played (3,959), seventh in assists (358), ninth in free throws made (364), ninth in free throw percentage (81.3), tenth in steals (131), tenth in 3-point field goals made (155), tenth in 3-point field goals attempted (449), and thirteenth all-time in points scored (1,401). He won the Ivy League Rookie of the Week honors four times during his freshman season (2007–08). Jackson-Cartwright was selected as a Second Team All-Ivy League honoree and also won the Philadelphia Big 5 Cy Kaselman Award for the Best Free Throw Percentage in 2012–13.

A notable Jackson-Cartwright play is when he scored a three-point play on a dunk over three Princeton players including Will Barrett, a six-foot/ten inch center. The points were the last ones scored in the away game loss and the dunk made ESPN SportsCenter's Top Plays of the day on March 8, 2011.

== Professional career ==
Jackson-Cartwright went undrafted in the 2014 NBA draft after his collegiate career ended. On July 23, 2014, he signed a contract to play basketball in the Netherlands for Aris Leeuwarden of the Dutch Basketball League.

In the 2015 offseason, he signed with Hanau White Wings of the German ProA, the national second tier.

== Personal life ==
He is the younger brother of Brianna Cartwright, an alternative singer/songwriter who performs under the name Jack Davey. His younger brother, Parker Jackson-Cartwright, played point guard at the University of Arizona from 2014–2018. Miles appeared in the documentary At All Costs, for which Parker was one of the main subjects.
