= Wesley Saunders =

American basketball player (born 1993)

No. 32 – Mineros de Zacatecas
- Position: Shooting guard / small forward
- League: LNBP

Personal information
- Born: June 16, 1993 (age 33) Los Angeles, California, U.S.
- Listed height: 6 ft 6 in (1.98 m)
- Listed weight: 218 lb (99 kg)

Career information
- High school: Windward (Mar Vista, California)
- College: Harvard (2011–2015)
- NBA draft: 2015: undrafted
- Playing career: 2015–present

Career history
- 2015–2016: Westchester Knicks
- 2016: Austin Spurs
- 2016–2017: Windy City Bulls
- 2017–2018: Joensuun Kataja
- 2018–2020: Vanoli Cremona
- 2020: Monaco
- 2020–2021: Fortitudo Bologna
- 2021–2022: Dolomiti Energia Trento
- 2022–2023: Santa Cruz Warriors
- 2023: Ontario Clippers
- 2023, 2024: Memphis Hustle
- 2024: Ostioneros de Guaymas
- 2024–2026: Oliveirense
- 2026–present: Mineros de Zacatecas

Career highlights
- Ivy League Player of the Year (2014); 3× First-team All-Ivy League (2013–2015); Third-team Parade All-American (2011)
- Stats at Basketball Reference

Wesley Saunders (born June 16, 1993) is an American professional basketball player for Mineros de Zacatecas of the Liga Nacional de Baloncesto Profesional de México (LNBP).He played college basketball for the Harvard Crimson.

== Early life ==
Wesley Saunders was born on June 16, 1993, in Los Angeles, California. Saunders lettered in basketball and volleyball at Windward High serving as basketball captain during his senior year. On that season he averaged 20.2 points and 10 rebounds per game and helped his team to win Division IV's state basketball, after winning the State Championship for Division V as a sophomore.

== College career ==
In his four-year career at Harvard, Saunders averaged 12.6 points, 4.1 rebounds, 3.2 assists and 1.5 steals over 29.8 minutes in 120 games, and averaged career-highs of 16.6 points, 6.1 rebounds and 4.3 assists as a senior, earning the Ivy League Player of the Year in 2014 alongside his third All-Ivy League first-team selection.

== Professional career ==
=== Westchester Knicks (2015–2016) ===
After going undrafted in the 2015 NBA draft, Saunders joined the Utah Jazz for the 2015 NBA Summer League. On September 10, 2015, he signed with the New York Knicks. However, he was later waived by the Knicks on October 23 after appearing in two preseason games. On November 2, he was acquired by the Westchester Knicks of the NBA Development League as an affiliate player of New York. On November 12, he made his professional debut in a 105–103 win over the Maine Red Claws, recording two points, three rebounds, one assist and one steal in 13 minutes off the bench.

=== Austin Spurs (2016) ===
On February 23, 2016, Saunders was traded to the Austin Spurs in exchange for Keith Wright. On March 24, he made his debut for Austin in a 106–93 win over the Texas Legends, recording one rebound in two minutes off the bench.

=== Windy City Bulls (2016–2017) ===
On August 24, 2016, Saunders' D-League rights were acquired by the Windy City Bulls in the expansion draft and on October 30, he was officially signed by Windy City.

=== Vanoli Cremona (2018–2020) ===
On July 26, 2018, Saunders signed a deal with the Italian club Vanoli Cremona.

=== Monaco (2020) ===
On July 30, 2020, Saunders signed with As Monaco of the LNB Pro A but resigned shortly after the beginning of the season.

=== Fortitudo Bologna (2020–2021) ===
Coach Romeo Sacchetti, who coached him the two years in Vanoli Cremona before he moved to coach Fortitudo Bologna, inked Saunders in Bologna on November 4, 2020. He parted ways with the team on June 30, 2021.

=== Dolomiti Energia Trento (2021–2022) ===
On August 13, 2021, Saunders signed with Dolomiti Energia Trento of the Italian Lega Basket Serie A (LBA).

=== Santa Cruz Warriors (2022–2023) ===
On December 20, 2022, Saunders was acquired by the Santa Cruz Warriors. On January 18, 2023, Saunders was waived.

=== Ontario Clippers (2023) ===
On January 20, 2023, Saunders was acquired by the Ontario Clippers. On March 1, 2023, Saunders was waived.

=== Memphis Hustle (2023, 2024) ===
On March 21, 2023, Saunders joined the Memphis Hustle, but was waived the next day. A year later, on March 7, he rejoined the Hustle, but on March 8, he was, again, waived. However, he rejoined the Hustle that night.

=== Ostioneros de Guaymas (2024) ===
On April 10, 2024, Saunders signed with the Ostioneros de Guaymas of the Circuito de Baloncesto de la Costa del Pacífico.

=== Oliveirense (2024–present) ===
On September 30, 2024, Saunders signed with Oliveirense of the Liga Portuguesa de Basquetebol.

== Personal life ==
Saunders' father, Ed, played defensive back at Iowa and graduated in 1977, while his uncle, John, played professional football with the Los Angeles Rams and was drafted in the fourth round of the 1972 NFL draft.
